= 2021 European Junior & U23 Weightlifting Championships =

International weightlifting competition

2021 European Junior & U23 Weightlifting Championship
- Venue: Santasport Sports Hall
- Location: Rovaniemi, Finland
- Dates: 24 September – 3 October

The 2021 European Junior & U23 Weightlifting Championships took place in Rovaniemi, Finland from 24 September to 3 October 2021. In total, 117 male and 91 female weightlifters from 35 countries competed in the under-23 competitions and 154 male and 118 female weightlifters from 38 countries competed in the junior competitions.

== Team ranking ==
Rank	Men's Junior		Women's Junior		Men's Under-23		Women's Under-23	
Rank	Team	Points	Team	Points	Team	Points	Team	Points
1	Russia	648	Russia	727	Russia	723	Russia	743
2	Ukraine	548	Poland	587	Ukraine	476	Ukraine	567
3	Armenia	529	Ukraine	515	Armenia	471	Finland	369
4	Georgia	447	Finland	472	Belarus	440	Poland	230
5	Italy	446	Turkey	444	Poland	390	Turkey	218
6	Finland	412	Italy	371	Finland	381	Great Britain	207

== Medal table ==
=== Big ===
Ranking by Big (Total result) medals

* Host nation (Finland)

Rank	Nation	Gold	Silver	Bronze	Total
1	Russia	10	10	5	25
2	Armenia	9	3	3	15
3	Ukraine	5	5	5	15
4	Italy	4	1	1	6
5	Belarus	2	3	3	8
6	Turkey	1	5	4	10
7	Romania	1	1	1	3
8	Germany	1	0	3	4
8	Poland	1	0	3	4
10	Great Britain	1	0	1	2
11	Israel	1	0	0	1
11	Lithuania	1	0	0	1
11	Netherlands	1	0	0	1
11	Norway	1	0	0	1
11	Serbia	1	0	0	1
16	Georgia	0	3	1	4
17	Bulgaria	0	2	2	4
18	Denmark	0	1	1	2
18	France	0	1	1	2
20	Austria	0	1	0	1
20	Czech Republic	0	1	0	1
20	Hungary	0	1	0	1
20	Latvia	0	1	0	1
20	Spain	0	1	0	1
25	Moldova	0	0	2	2
25	Slovakia	0	0	2	2
27	Finland*	0	0	1	1
27	Greece	0	0	1	1
Totals (28 entries)		40	40	40	120

=== Big and Small ===
Ranking by all medals: Big (Total result) and Small (Snatch and Clean & Jerk)

* Host nation (Finland)

Rank	Nation	Gold	Silver	Bronze	Total
1	Russia	28	30	18	76
2	Armenia	25	10	8	43
3	Ukraine	19	13	16	48
4	Italy	13	5	3	21
5	Turkey	5	13	10	28
6	Belarus	5	11	9	25
7	Romania	3	3	3	9
8	Germany	3	1	7	11
9	Israel	3	0	0	3
9	Netherlands	3	0	0	3
11	Poland	2	4	8	14
12	Great Britain	2	1	3	6
13	Lithuania	2	1	0	3
14	Serbia	2	0	2	4
15	Norway	2	0	0	2
16	France	1	2	2	5
17	Hungary	1	1	2	4
18	Czech Republic	1	1	1	3
19	Bulgaria	0	8	4	12
20	Georgia	0	6	4	10
21	Austria	0	3	0	3
22	Denmark	0	2	3	5
23	Latvia	0	2	0	2
24	Moldova	0	1	7	8
25	Slovakia	0	1	3	4
25	Spain	0	1	3	4
27	Finland*	0	0	2	2
27	Greece	0	0	2	2
Totals (28 entries)		120	120	120	360

== Medal summary ==
=== Juniors ===
==== Men ====
Event	Gold		Silver		Bronze	
55 kg
Snatch	František Polák (CZE)	103 kg	Şahin Çelik (TUR)	102 kg	Garnik Cholakyan (ARM)	100 kg
Clean & Jerk	Garnik Cholakyan (ARM)	130 kg	Melihcan Günay (TUR)	121 kg	František Polák (CZE)	121 kg
Total	Garnik Cholakyan (ARM)	230 kg	František Polák (CZE)	224 kg	Melihcan Günay (TUR)	217 kg
61 kg
Snatch	Sergio Massidda (ITA)	126 kg	Vanik Mkhitarian (RUS)	120 kg	Aindi Dzhabirov (RUS)	117 kg
Clean & Jerk	Sergio Massidda (ITA)	154 kg	Angel Rusev (BUL)	153 kg	Gabriel Marinov (BUL)	152 kg
Total	Sergio Massidda (ITA)	280 kg	Vanik Mkhitarian (RUS)	269 kg	Gabriel Marinov (BUL)	267 kg
67 kg
Snatch	Gor Sahakyan (ARM)	136 kg	Albert Sharkov (RUS)	135 kg	Yusuf Fehmi Genç (TUR)	132 kg
Clean & Jerk	Gor Sahakyan (ARM)	165 kg	Yusuf Fehmi Genç (TUR)	163 kg	Ivan Dimov (BUL)	161 kg
Total	Gor Sahakyan (ARM)	301 kg	Yusuf Fehmi Genç (TUR)	295 kg	Ivan Dimov (BUL)	291 kg
73 kg
Snatch	Uladzimir Zaitsau (BLR)	140 kg	Archil Malakmadze (GEO)	136 kg	Ismail Jamali (ESP)	136 kg
Clean & Jerk	Fabrizio Veglia (ITA)	165 kg	Andrei Fralou (BLR)	164 kg	Ismail Jamali (ESP)	162 kg
Total	Uladzimir Zaitsau (BLR)	300 kg	Ismail Jamali (ESP)	298 kg	Fabrizio Veglia (ITA)	298 kg
81 kg
Snatch	Karen Margaryan (ARM)	153 kg	Suren Grigoryan (ARM)	148 kg	Artem Gorlov (RUS)	146 kg
Clean & Jerk	Maksym Moskvin (UKR)	181 kg	Suren Grigoryan (ARM)	180 kg	Artem Gorlov (RUS)	178 kg
Total	Karen Margaryan (ARM)	330 kg	Suren Grigoryan (ARM)	328 kg	Artem Gorlov (RUS)	324 kg
89 kg
Snatch	Cristiano Ficco (ITA)	158 kg	Maksim Moguchev (RUS)	157 kg	Oleh Nikolaienko (UKR)	155 kg
Clean & Jerk	Gevorg Ghahramanyan (ARM)	196 kg	Cristiano Ficco (ITA)	190 kg	Tudor Bratu (MDA)	190 kg
Total	Cristiano Ficco (ITA)	348 kg	Maksim Moguchev (RUS)	342 kg	Gevorg Ghahramanyan (ARM)	341 kg
96 kg
Snatch	Artur Babayan (RUS)	167 kg	Garik Karapetyan (ARM)	166 kg	Maksym Dombrovskyi (UKR)	161 kg
Clean & Jerk	Artur Babayan (RUS)	198 kg	Illia Moskalenko (UKR)	194 kg	Maksym Dombrovskyi (UKR)	191 kg
Total	Artur Babayan (RUS)	365 kg	Garik Karapetyan (ARM)	356 kg	Illia Moskalenko (UKR)	353 kg
102 kg
Snatch	Siarhei Sharankou (BLR)	167 kg	Zara Lomtadze (GEO)	155 kg	Petros Petrosyan (ARM)	155 kg
Clean & Jerk	Zara Lomtadze (GEO)	196 kg	Siarhei Sharankou (BLR)	195 kg	Petros Petrosyan (ARM)	194 kg
Total	Siarhei Sharankou (BLR)	362 kg	Zara Lomtadze (GEO)	351 kg	Petros Petrosyan (ARM)	349 kg
109 kg
Snatch	Bohdan Hoza (UKR)	190 kg WJR	Daniil Vagaitsev (RUS)	180 kg	Akaki Talakhadze (GEO)	155 kg
Clean & Jerk	Bohdan Hoza (UKR)	210 kg	Daniil Vagaitsev (RUS)	204 kg	Akaki Talakhadze (GEO)	195 kg
Total	Bohdan Hoza (UKR)	400 kg	Daniil Vagaitsev (RUS)	384 kg	Akaki Talakhadze (GEO)	350 kg
+109 kg
Snatch	Enzo Kuworge (NED)	175 kg	Yevhen Burbala (UKR)	161 kg	Olaf Pasikowski (POL)	150 kg
Clean & Jerk	Enzo Kuworge (NED)	210 kg	Ali Oflaz (TUR)	198 kg	Yevhen Burbala (UKR)	197 kg
Total	Enzo Kuworge (NED)	385 kg	Yevhen Burbala (UKR)	358 kg	Ali Oflaz (TUR)	348 kg

==== Women ====
Event	Gold		Silver		Bronze	
45 kg
Snatch	Radmila Zagorac (SRB)	65 kg	Asuman Ayhan (TUR)	63 kg	Alina Guzikova (RUS)	62 kg
Clean & Jerk	Asuman Ayhan (TUR)	80 kg	Alina Guzikova (RUS)	80 kg	Radmila Zagorac (SRB)	80 kg
Total	Radmila Zagorac (SRB)	145 kg	Asuman Ayhan (TUR)	143 kg	Alina Guzikova (RUS)	142 kg
49 kg
Snatch	Giulia Imperio (ITA)	82 kg	Polina Andreeva (RUS)	76 kg	Elizaveta Zhatkina (RUS)	70 kg
Clean & Jerk	Giulia Imperio (ITA)	101 kg EJR	Elizaveta Zhatkina (RUS)	92 kg	Polina Andreeva (RUS)	91 kg
Total	Giulia Imperio (ITA)	183 kg	Polina Andreeva (RUS)	167 kg	Elizaveta Zhatkina (RUS)	162 kg
55 kg
Snatch	Svitlana Samuliak (UKR)	88 kg	Olha Ivzhenko (UKR)	82 kg	Annika Pilz (GER)	80 kg
Clean & Jerk	Svitlana Samuliak (UKR)	103 kg	Olha Ivzhenko (UKR)	98 kg	Khrystsina Krachava (BLR)	98 kg
Total	Svitlana Samuliak (UKR)	191 kg	Olha Ivzhenko (UKR)	180 kg	Annika Pilz (GER)	178 kg
59 kg
Snatch	Kamila Konotop (UKR)	95 kg	Cansel Özkan (TUR)	92 kg	Chiara Piccinno (ITA)	91 kg
Clean & Jerk	Kamila Konotop (UKR)	114 kg	Monika Szymanek (POL)	113 kg	Alina Zakharchenko (UKR)	112 kg
Total	Kamila Konotop (UKR)	209 kg	Alina Zakharchenko (UKR)	203 kg	Cansel Özkan (TUR)	202 kg
64 kg
Snatch	Giulia Miserendino (ITA)	100 kg	Aysel Özkan (TUR)	99 kg	Wiktoria Wołk (POL)	88 kg
Clean & Jerk	Giulia Miserendino (ITA)	120 kg	Wiktoria Wołk (POL)	110 kg	Aysel Özkan (TUR)	105 kg
Total	Giulia Miserendino (ITA)	220 kg	Aysel Özkan (TUR)	204 kg	Wiktoria Wołk (POL)	198 kg
71 kg
Snatch	Evgeniia Guseva (RUS)	103 kg	Maria-Magdalena Kireva (BUL)	93 kg	Aino Luostarinen (FIN)	91 kg
Clean & Jerk	Evgeniia Guseva (RUS)	127 kg	Daniela Ivanova (LAT)	114 kg	Yevheniia Rosinska (UKR)	109 kg
Total	Evgeniia Guseva (RUS)	230 kg	Daniela Ivanova (LAT)	201 kg	Aino Luostarinen (FIN)	200 kg
76 kg
Snatch	Mariia Andreeva (RUS)	106 kg	Dilara Uçan (TUR)	101 kg	Milena Khachatryan (ARM)	99 kg
Clean & Jerk	Dilara Uçan (TUR)	127 kg	Mariia Andreeva (RUS)	123 kg	Milena Khachatryan (ARM)	121 kg
Total	Mariia Andreeva (RUS)	229 kg	Dilara Uçan (TUR)	228 kg	Milena Khachatryan (ARM)	220 kg
81 kg
Snatch	Liana Gyurjyan (ARM)	95 kg	Lenka Žembová (SVK)	92 kg	Sara Yenigün (TUR)	91 kg
Clean & Jerk	Sara Yenigün (TUR)	122 kg	Liana Gyurjyan (ARM)	121 kg	Elvira Borozna (UKR)	108 kg
Total	Liana Gyurjyan (ARM)	216 kg	Sara Yenigün (TUR)	213 kg	Lenka Žembová (SVK)	199 kg
87 kg
Snatch	Viktória Boros (HUN)	92 kg	Agnieszka Zimroz (POL)	91 kg	Irene Blanco (ESP)	91 kg
Clean & Jerk	Margarita Arakelyan (ARM)	116 kg	Agnieszka Zimroz (POL)	110 kg	Viktória Boros (HUN)	109 kg
Total	Margarita Arakelyan (ARM)	202 kg	Viktória Boros (HUN)	201 kg	Agnieszka Zimroz (POL)	201 kg
+87 kg
Snatch	Viktoriia Orlova (RUS)	101 kg	Mariia Belozerova (RUS)	96 kg	Anastasiia Vlasenko (UKR)	95 kg
Clean & Jerk	Viktoriia Orlova (RUS)	137 kg	Nuran Yalçın (TUR)	118 kg	Mariia Belozerova (RUS)	118 kg
Total	Viktoriia Orlova (RUS)	238 kg	Mariia Belozerova (RUS)	214 kg	Anastasiia Vlasenko (UKR)	212 kg

=== Under-23 ===
==== Men ====
Event	Gold		Silver		Bronze	
55 kg
Snatch	Cristian Luca (ROU)	112 kg	Valentin Iancu (ROU)	108 kg	Leon Schedler (GER)	105 kg
Clean & Jerk	Cristian Luca (ROU)	131 kg	Valentin Iancu (ROU)	131 kg	Leon Schedler (GER)	130 kg
Total	Cristian Luca (ROU)	243 kg	Valentin Iancu (ROU)	239 kg	Leon Schedler (GER)	235 kg
61 kg
Snatch	Pavlo Zalipskyi (UKR)	124 kg	Daniel Lungu (MDA)	123 kg	Jon Luke Mau (GER)	121 kg
Clean & Jerk	Jon Luke Mau (GER)	157 kg	Pavlo Zalipskyi (UKR)	146 kg	Stefan Vladisavljev (SRB)	136 kg
Total	Jon Luke Mau (GER)	278 kg	Pavlo Zalipskyi (UKR)	270 kg	Daniel Lungu (MDA)	258 kg
67 kg
Snatch	Zulfat Garaev (RUS)	144 kg	Valentin Genchev (BUL)	129 kg	Mahmut Terzi (TUR)	128 kg
Clean & Jerk	Zulfat Garaev (RUS)	163 kg	Valentin Genchev (BUL)	158 kg	Batuhan Sancak (TUR)	152 kg
Total	Zulfat Garaev (RUS)	307 kg	Valentin Genchev (BUL)	287 kg	Henadz Laptseu (BLR)	276 kg
73 kg
Snatch	Ilya Zharnouski (BLR)	146 kg	Aslan Kaskulov (RUS)	146 kg	Kakhi Asanidze (GEO)	146 kg
Clean & Jerk	Piotr Kudłaszyk (POL)	180 kg	Kakhi Asanidze (GEO)	174 kg	Ilya Zharnouski (BLR)	173 kg
Total	Piotr Kudłaszyk (POL)	321 kg	Kakhi Asanidze (GEO)	320 kg	Ilya Zharnouski (BLR)	319 kg
81 kg
Snatch	Aleksandr Urvachev (RUS)	159 kg	Vitalii Smochek (UKR)	157 kg	Marin Robu (MDA)	156 kg
Clean & Jerk	Rafik Harutyunyan (ARM)	190 kg	Aleksandr Urvachev (RUS)	185 kg	Marin Robu (MDA)	181 kg
Total	Rafik Harutyunyan (ARM)	345 kg	Aleksandr Urvachev (RUS)	344 kg	Vitalii Smochek (UKR)	338 kg
89 kg
Snatch	Karen Avagyan (ARM)	165 kg	Revaz Davitadze (GEO)	163 kg	Yulian Kurlovich (BLR)	158 kg
Clean & Jerk	Karen Avagyan (ARM)	195 kg	Revaz Davitadze (GEO)	193 kg	Nikita Khrulev (RUS)	191 kg
Total	Karen Avagyan (ARM)	360 kg	Revaz Davitadze (GEO)	356 kg	Nikita Khrulev (RUS)	346 kg
96 kg
Snatch	Ara Aghanyan (ARM)	166 kg	Viktor Kondratev (RUS)	165 kg	Bartłomiej Adamus (POL)	158 kg
Clean & Jerk	Viktor Kondratev (RUS)	202 kg	Ara Aghanyan (ARM)	197 kg	Bartłomiej Adamus (POL)	196 kg
Total	Viktor Kondratev (RUS)	367 kg	Ara Aghanyan (ARM)	363 kg	Bartłomiej Adamus (POL)	354 kg
102 kg
Snatch	Murat Abaev (RUS)	170 kg	Andrei Arlionak (BLR)	165 kg	Andrei Ciobanu (ROU)	162 kg
Clean & Jerk	Oleksii Khandus (UKR)	195 kg	Murat Abaev (RUS)	190 kg	Andrei Ciobanu (ROU)	187 kg
Total	Murat Abaev (RUS)	360 kg	Oleksii Khandus (UKR)	350 kg	Andrei Ciobanu (ROU)	349 kg
109 kg
Snatch	Arsen Martirosyan (ARM)	176 kg	Kanstantsin Kurouski (BLR)	175 kg	Dmitrii Gogichaev (RUS)	169 kg
Clean & Jerk	Arsen Martirosyan (ARM)	207 kg	Kanstantsin Kurouski (BLR)	206 kg	Egor Pushmin (RUS)	205 kg
Total	Arsen Martirosyan (ARM)	383 kg	Kanstantsin Kurouski (BLR)	381 kg	Egor Pushmin (RUS)	373 kg
+109 kg
Snatch	Varazdat Lalayan (ARM)	206 kg	Eduard Ziaziulin (BLR)	201 kg	Oleh Hanzenko (UKR)	177 kg
Clean & Jerk	Varazdat Lalayan (ARM)	241 kg	Eduard Ziaziulin (BLR)	230 kg	Oleh Hanzenko (UKR)	201 kg
Total	Varazdat Lalayan (ARM)	447 kg	Eduard Ziaziulin (BLR)	431 kg	Oleh Hanzenko (UKR)	378 kg

==== Women ====
Event	Gold		Silver		Bronze	
45 kg
Snatch	Aleksandra Furdik (RUS)	64 kg	Regina Shaidullina (RUS)	64 kg	Concordia Butnari (MDA)	55 kg
Clean & Jerk	Regina Shaidullina (RUS)	87 kg	Aleksandra Furdik (RUS)	71 kg	Concordia Butnari (MDA)	68 kg
Total	Regina Shaidullina (RUS)	151 kg	Aleksandra Furdik (RUS)	135 kg	Concordia Butnari (MDA)	123 kg
49 kg
Snatch	Kseniia Kozina (RUS)	73 kg	Nadezhda Nguen (BUL)	72 kg	Dziyana Karchinskaya (BLR)	66 kg
Clean & Jerk	Kseniia Kozina (RUS)	89 kg	Nadezhda Nguen (BUL)	85 kg	Dziyana Karchinskaya (BLR)	78 kg
Total	Kseniia Kozina (RUS)	162 kg	Nadezhda Nguen (BUL)	157 kg	Dziyana Karchinskaya (BLR)	144 kg
55 kg
Snatch	Garance Rigaud (FRA)	86 kg	Fraer Morrow (GBR)	85 kg	Catrin Jones (GBR)	82 kg
Clean & Jerk	Fraer Morrow (GBR)	108 kg	Garance Rigaud (FRA)	106 kg	Catrin Jones (GBR)	104 kg
Total	Fraer Morrow (GBR)	193 kg	Garance Rigaud (FRA)	192 kg	Catrin Jones (GBR)	186 kg
59 kg
Snatch	Mariia Hanhur (UKR)	98 kg	Lucrezia Magistris (ITA)	93 kg	Sofia Georgopoulou (GRE)	92 kg
Clean & Jerk	Mariia Hanhur (UKR)	112 kg	Nataliia Shaimanova (RUS)	107 kg	Lucrezia Magistris (ITA)	104 kg
Total	Mariia Hanhur (UKR)	210 kg	Lucrezia Magistris (ITA)	197 kg	Sofia Georgopoulou (GRE)	195 kg
64 kg
Snatch	Nuray Levent (TUR)	96 kg	Hanna Panova (UKR)	93 kg	Alina Shchapanava (BLR)	92 kg
Clean & Jerk	Nuray Levent (TUR)	118 kg	Alina Shchapanava (BLR)	115 kg	Vicky Graillot (FRA)	112 kg
Total	Nuray Levent (TUR)	214 kg	Alina Shchapanava (BLR)	207 kg	Vicky Graillot (FRA)	204 kg
71 kg
Snatch	Lara Dancz (GER)	95 kg	Lijana Jakaitė (LTU)	95 kg	Veronika Mitykó (HUN)	94 kg
Clean & Jerk	Lijana Jakaitė (LTU)	113 kg	Line Gude (DEN)	112 kg	Emilia Rechul (POL)	109 kg
Total	Lijana Jakaitė (LTU)	208 kg	Line Gude (DEN)	203 kg	Lara Dancz (GER)	199 kg
76 kg
Snatch	Nicole Rubanovich (ISR)	95 kg	Angelina Zubova (RUS)	94 kg	Alina Kirychuk (UKR)	93 kg
Clean & Jerk	Nicole Rubanovich (ISR)	115 kg	Alina Kirychuk (UKR)	113 kg	Angelina Zubova (RUS)	112 kg
Total	Nicole Rubanovich (ISR)	210 kg	Angelina Zubova (RUS)	206 kg	Alina Kirychuk (UKR)	206 kg
81 kg
Snatch	Anastasiia Manievska (UKR)	98 kg	Tatiana Fedichkina (RUS)	97 kg	Nikola Seničová (SVK)	96 kg
Clean & Jerk	Anastasiia Manievska (UKR)	127 kg	Chantal Schreiber (GER)	118 kg	Tatiana Fedichkina (RUS)	116 kg
Total	Anastasiia Manievska (UKR)	225 kg	Tatiana Fedichkina (RUS)	213 kg	Nikola Seničová (SVK)	211 kg
87 kg
Snatch	Daria Akhmerova (RUS)	110 kg	Sarah Fischer (AUT)	93 kg	Anne Sofie Vejsgaard Jensen (DEN)	91 kg
Clean & Jerk	Daria Akhmerova (RUS)	135 kg	Sarah Fischer (AUT)	117 kg	Anne Sofie Vejsgaard Jensen (DEN)	109 kg
Total	Daria Akhmerova (RUS)	245 kg	Sarah Fischer (AUT)	210 kg	Anne Sofie Vejsgaard Jensen (DEN)	200 kg
+87 kg
Snatch	Valentyna Kisil (UKR)	109 kg	Taisiya Chizhikova (RUS)	108 kg	Melike Günal (TUR)	106 kg
Clean & Jerk	Solfrid Koanda (NOR)	140 kg	Melike Günal (TUR)	135 kg	Taisiya Chizhikova (RUS)	134 kg
Total	Solfrid Koanda (NOR)	243 kg	Taisiya Chizhikova (RUS)	242 kg	Melike Günal (TUR)	241 kg
