= 2021 Junior World Weightlifting Championships =

- Location: Tashkent, Uzbekistan
- Dates: 23–31 May
- Competitors: 244 from 53 nations

The 2021 Junior World Weightlifting Championships were held in Tashkent, Uzbekistan from 23 to 31 May 2021.

== Medal table ==
Ranking by Big (Total result) medals

* Host nation (Uzbekistan)

Rank	Nation	Gold	Silver	Bronze	Total
1	Kazakhstan	3	2	1	6
2	Turkey	2	3	1	6
3	Uzbekistan*	2	2	1	5
4	Armenia	2	1	0	3
5	Indonesia	2	0	0	2
6	Russia	1	3	5	9
7	Ukraine	1	1	2	4
8	Italy	1	1	1	3
8	Romania	1	1	1	3
10	Bulgaria	1	1	0	2
10	United States	1	1	0	2
12	Moldova	1	0	1	2
13	Netherlands	1	0	0	1
13	Tunisia	1	0	0	1
15	Ecuador	0	1	2	3
15	Iran	0	1	2	3
17	Belgium	0	1	0	1
17	India	0	1	0	1
19	Belarus	0	0	1	1
19	Canada	0	0	1	1
19	Georgia	0	0	1	1
Totals (21 entries)		20	20	20	60

Ranking by all medals: Big (Total result) and Small (Snatch and Clean & Jerk)

* Host nation (Uzbekistan)

Rank	Nation	Gold	Silver	Bronze	Total
1	Kazakhstan	10	6	1	17
2	Uzbekistan*	7	5	2	14
3	Turkey	6	6	6	18
4	Ukraine	6	3	2	11
5	Indonesia	6	0	3	9
6	Russia	4	6	14	24
7	Armenia	3	5	0	8
8	Romania	3	4	2	9
9	Italy	3	2	5	10
10	Tunisia	3	0	1	4
11	Netherlands	3	0	0	3
12	United States	2	5	0	7
13	Bulgaria	2	4	0	6
14	Moldova	2	1	1	4
15	Ecuador	0	4	5	9
16	Iran	0	3	7	10
17	Belgium	0	3	0	3
18	India	0	2	1	3
19	Poland	0	1	0	1
20	Belarus	0	0	3	3
21	Canada	0	0	2	2
21	Georgia	0	0	2	2
23	Germany	0	0	1	1
23	Panama	0	0	1	1
23	South Korea	0	0	1	1
Totals (25 entries)		60	60	60	180

== Medalists ==
=== Men ===
Event	Gold		Silver		Bronze	
55 kg
Snatch	Ablay Auyelkhanov; Kazakhstan	108 kg	Ogabek Nafasov; Uzbekistan	104 kg	Juan Martínez; Panama	102 kg
Clean & Jerk	Ablay Auyelkhanov; Kazakhstan	140 kg	Ogabek Nafasov; Uzbekistan	129 kg	Benjamín Zurita; Ecuador	127 kg
Total	Ablay Auyelkhanov; Kazakhstan	248 kg	Ogabek Nafasov; Uzbekistan	233 kg	Benjamín Zurita; Ecuador	228 kg
61 kg
Snatch	Sergio Massidda; Italy	129 kg	Alexey Drozdov; Kazakhstan	128 kg	Shin Rok; South Korea	125 kg
Clean & Jerk	Sergio Massidda; Italy	156 kg	Alexey Drozdov; Kazakhstan	154 kg	Davide Ruiu; Italy	153 kg
Total	Sergio Massidda; Italy	285 kg	Alexey Drozdov; Kazakhstan	282 kg	Vanik Mkhitarian; Russia	265 kg
67 kg
Snatch	Muhammed Furkan Özbek; Turkey	141 kg	Jeremy Lalrinnunga; India	135 kg	Albert Sharkov; Russia	134 kg
Clean & Jerk	Sairamkez Akmolda; Kazakhstan	176 kg	Muhammed Furkan Özbek; Turkey	176 kg	Yusuf Fehmi Genç; Turkey	168 kg
Total	Muhammed Furkan Özbek; Turkey	317 kg	Sairamkez Akmolda; Kazakhstan	308 kg	Yusuf Fehmi Genç; Turkey	301 kg
73 kg
Snatch	Rizki Juniansyah; Indonesia	155 kg JWR	Gevorg Serobian; Russia	143 kg	Achinta Sheuli; India	141 kg
Clean & Jerk	Rizki Juniansyah; Indonesia	194 kg JWR	Saikhan Taisuyev; Kazakhstan	175 kg	Fabrizio Veglia; Italy	172 kg
Total	Rizki Juniansyah; Indonesia	349 kg JWR	Achinta Sheuli; India	313 kg	Gevorg Serobian; Russia	308 kg
81 kg
Snatch	Mukhammadkodir Toshtemirov; Uzbekistan	161 kg	Karen Margaryan; Armenia	152 kg	İsmet Samet Coşkun; Turkey	151 kg
Clean & Jerk	Mukhammadkodir Toshtemirov; Uzbekistan	182 kg	Maksym Moskvin; Ukraine	177 kg	Khojiakbar Olimov; Uzbekistan	176 kg
Total	Mukhammadkodir Toshtemirov; Uzbekistan	343 kg	Karen Margaryan; Armenia	327 kg	Khojiakbar Olimov; Uzbekistan	326 kg
89 kg
Snatch	Oleh Nikolaienko; Ukraine	158 kg	Tudor Bratu; Moldova	155 kg	Raphael Friedrich; Germany	154 kg
Clean & Jerk	Tudor Bratu; Moldova	191 kg	Neiser Grefa; Ecuador	190 kg	Maksim Moguchev; Russia	188 kg
Total	Tudor Bratu; Moldova	346 kg	Maksim Moguchev; Russia	341 kg	Oleh Nikolaienko; Ukraine	339 kg
96 kg
Snatch	Artur Babayan; Russia	163 kg	Garik Karapetyan; Armenia	162 kg	Hossein Beiranvand; Iran	157 kg
Clean & Jerk	Illia Moskalenko; Ukraine	194 kg	Garik Karapetyan; Armenia	193 kg	Artur Babayan; Russia	191 kg
Total	Garik Karapetyan; Armenia	355 kg	Artur Babayan; Russia	354 kg	Illia Moskalenko; Ukraine	349 kg
102 kg
Snatch	Rakhat Bekbolat; Kazakhstan	175 kg	Vasil Marinov; Bulgaria	170 kg	Siarhei Sharankou; Belarus	162 kg
Clean & Jerk	Rakhat Bekbolat; Kazakhstan	202 kg	Vasil Marinov; Bulgaria	200 kg	Zaza Lomtadze; Georgia	194 kg
Total	Rakhat Bekbolat; Kazakhstan	377 kg	Vasil Marinov; Bulgaria	370 kg	Zaza Lomtadze; Georgia	351 kg
109 kg
Snatch	Bohdan Hoza; Ukraine	189 kg JWR	Hristo Hristov; Bulgaria	187 kg	Daniil Vagaitsev; Russia	175 kg
Clean & Jerk	Hristo Hristov; Bulgaria	216 kg	Bohdan Hoza; Ukraine	213 kg	Daniil Vagaitsev; Russia	212 kg
Total	Hristo Hristov; Bulgaria	403 kg	Bohdan Hoza; Ukraine	402 kg	Daniil Vagaitsev; Russia	387 kg
+109 kg
Snatch	Enzo Kuworge; Netherlands	180 kg	Alireza Zandi; Iran	173 kg	Reza Hassanpour; Iran	172 kg
Clean & Jerk	Enzo Kuworge; Netherlands	231 kg	Reza Hassanpour; Iran	226 kg	Alireza Zandi; Iran	221 kg
Total	Enzo Kuworge; Netherlands	411 kg	Reza Hassanpour; Iran	398 kg	Alireza Zandi; Iran	394 kg

=== Women ===
Event	Gold		Silver		Bronze	
45 kg
Snatch	Cansu Bektaş; Turkey	70 kg	Melisa Güneş; Turkey	69 kg	Lada Latushkina; Russia	68 kg
Clean & Jerk	Cansu Bektaş; Turkey	84 kg	Cosmina Pană; Romania	84 kg	Melisa Güneş; Turkey	80 kg
Total	Cansu Bektaş; Turkey	154 kg	Melisa Güneş; Turkey	149 kg	Teodora-Luminița Hîncu; Moldova	145 kg
49 kg
Snatch	Windy Cantika Aisah; Indonesia	86 kg	Mihaela Cambei; Romania	86 kg	Giulia Imperio; Italy	85 kg
Clean & Jerk	Windy Cantika Aisah; Indonesia	105 kg	Mihaela Cambei; Romania	99 kg	Elizaveta Zhatkina; Russia	94 kg
Total	Windy Cantika Aisah; Indonesia	191 kg	Mihaela Cambei; Romania	185 kg	Elizaveta Zhatkina; Russia	165 kg
55 kg
Snatch	Kamila Konotop; Ukraine	96 kg	Nina Sterckx; Belgium	90 kg	Andreea Cotruţa; Romania	83 kg
Clean & Jerk	Kamila Konotop; Ukraine	116 kg	Nina Sterckx; Belgium	108 kg	Juliana Klarisa; Indonesia	105 kg
Total	Kamila Konotop; Ukraine	212 kg JWR	Nina Sterckx; Belgium	198 kg	Andreea Cotruţa; Romania	188 kg
59 kg
Snatch	Ghofrane Belkhir; Tunisia	91 kg	Cansel Özkan; Turkey	90 kg	Chiara Piccinno; Italy	86 kg
Clean & Jerk	Ghofrane Belkhir; Tunisia	120 kg	Monika Szymanek; Poland	111 kg	Nelly; Indonesia	110 kg
Total	Ghofrane Belkhir; Tunisia	211 kg	Cansel Özkan; Turkey	194 kg	Chiara Piccinno; Italy	192 kg
64 kg
Snatch	Raluca Olaru; Romania	98 kg	Giulia Miserendino; Italy	97 kg	Chaima Rahmouni; Tunisia	92 kg
Clean & Jerk	Raluca Olaru; Romania	116 kg	Gulnur Ybray; Kazakhstan	115 kg	Restu Anggi; Indonesia	114 kg
Total	Raluca Olaru; Romania	214 kg	Giulia Miserendino; Italy	207 kg	Gulnur Ybray; Kazakhstan	205 kg
71 kg
Snatch	Kumushkhon Fayzullaeva; Uzbekistan	103 kg	Olivia Reeves; United States	102 kg	Evgeniia Guseva; Russia	102 kg
Clean & Jerk	Olivia Reeves; United States	127 kg	Kumushkhon Fayzullaeva; Uzbekistan	122 kg	Evgeniia Guseva; Russia	120 kg
Total	Olivia Reeves; United States	229 kg	Kumushkhon Fayzullaeva; Uzbekistan	225 kg	Evgeniia Guseva; Russia	222 kg
76 kg
Snatch	Iana Sotieva; Russia	108 kg	Anna McElderry; United States	99 kg	Bella Paredes; Ecuador	98 kg
Clean & Jerk	Iana Sotieva; Russia	125 kg	Bella Paredes; Ecuador	119 kg	Ryna Litoshyk; Belarus	117 kg
Total	Iana Sotieva; Russia	233 kg	Bella Paredes; Ecuador	217 kg	Ryna Litoshyk; Belarus	215 kg
81 kg
Snatch	Dilara Uçan; Turkey	99 kg	Liana Gyurjyan; Armenia	98 kg	Kelin Jiménez; Ecuador	94 kg
Clean & Jerk	Liana Gyurjyan; Armenia	125 kg	Kelin Jiménez; Ecuador	124 kg	Dilara Uçan; Turkey	123 kg
Total	Liana Gyurjyan; Armenia	223 kg	Dilara Uçan; Turkey	222 kg	Kelin Jiménez; Ecuador	218 kg
87 kg
Snatch	Tursunoy Jabborova; Uzbekistan	111 kg	Avery Owens; United States	93 kg	Yekta Jamali; Iran	92 kg
Clean & Jerk	Tursunoy Jabborova; Uzbekistan	133 kg	Avery Owens; United States	118 kg	Yekta Jamali; Iran	116 kg
Total	Tursunoy Jabborova; Uzbekistan	244 kg	Avery Owens; United States	211 kg	Yekta Jamali; Iran	208 kg
+87 kg
Snatch	Aysamal Sansyzbayeva; Kazakhstan	113 kg	Viktoriia Orlova; Russia	105 kg	Emma Friesen; Canada	100 kg
Clean & Jerk	Aysamal Sansyzbayeva; Kazakhstan	145 kg	Viktoriia Orlova; Russia	130 kg	Nuran Yalçın; Turkey	121 kg
Total	Aysamal Sansyzbayeva; Kazakhstan	258 kg	Viktoriia Orlova; Russia	235 kg	Emma Friesen; Canada	215 kg

== Team ranking ==
=== Men ===
Rank	Team	Points
1	Russia	646
2	Turkey	527
3	Uzbekistan	500
4	Ukraine	467
5	Kazakhstan	375
6	Italy	367
7	United States	363
8	Georgia	301
9	Armenia	294
10	Iran	262

=== Women ===
Rank	Team	Points
1	Turkey	672
2	Russia	608
3	United States	594
4	Indonesia	397
5	Ukraine	321
6	Uzbekistan	305
7	Romania	252
8	Poland	249
9	Italy	220
10	Ecuador	205

== Participating nations ==
244 athletes (105 in women from 34 nations and 139 in men from 42 nations) from 53 nations competed. Additional 14 people competed only for Olympic points and quotas.

- Algeria (1)
- Armenia (7)
- Austria (2+1)
- Azerbaijan (5)
- Bangladesh (4)
- Belgium (3)
- Belarus (4)
- Botswana (1)
- Bulgaria (2)
- Canada (4)
- Chile (3)
- Colombia (2+2)
- Croatia (3)
- Cuba (2+1)
- Ecuador (6+1)
- Spain (2)
- Estonia (1)
- Finland (1)
- France (1)
- Georgia (5)
- Germany (2)
- Greece (6)
- Hungary (2+1)
- Indonesia (9+1)
- India (2)
- Iran (6)
- Iraq (1)
- Italy (12)
- Kazakhstan (7)
- Kyrgyzstan (2)
- South Korea (2)
- Saudi Arabia (4+1)
- Latvia (1+1)
- Lithuania (1)
- Moldova (4+1)
- Mongolia (4)
- Netherlands (1)
- Panama (2)
- Peru (1)
- Palestine (1)
- Poland (11+1)
- Romania (4)
- Russia (19)
- Slovakia (3+1)
- Syria (3)
- Tonga (1)
- Turkmenistan (5+1)
- Tunisia (2)
- Turkey (20+1)
- United Arab Emirates (2)
- Ukraine (12)
- United States (19)
- Uzbekistan (13)

=== Most participants ===
Number	Country	Athletes (W+M)
1	Turkey	10+10=20
2	Russia	9+10=19
3	United States	10+9=19
4	Uzbekistan	5+8=13
5	Italy	4+8=12
6	Ukraine	5+7=12
7	Poland	5+6=11
8	Indonesia	6+3=9
9	Armenia	2+5=7
10	Kazakhstan	2+5=7

== Men's results ==
Green denotes athletes who can't compete in championships because they were born before 2001, but they compete as "extra athletes" to get results counted for the qualifications for 2020 Summer Olympics.

=== 55 kg ===
Rank	Athlete	Group	Snatch (kg)				Clean & Jerk (kg)				Total
Rank	Athlete	Group	1	2	3	Rank	1	2	3	Rank	Total
1st place, gold medalist(s)	Ablay Auyelkhanov (KAZ)	A	103	106	108	1st place, gold medalist(s)	132	~~140~~	140	1st place, gold medalist(s)	248
2nd place, silver medalist(s)	Ogabek Nafasov (UZB)	A	~~104~~	104	~~109~~	2nd place, silver medalist(s)	126	129	~~133~~	2nd place, silver medalist(s)	233
3rd place, bronze medalist(s)	Benjamín Zurita (ECU)	A	95	99	101	4	120	124	127	3rd place, bronze medalist(s)	228
4	Federico La Barbera (ITA)	A	~~96~~	~~96~~	98	5	120	125	~~131~~	5	223
5	Juan Martínez (PAN)	A	97	~~100~~	102	3rd place, bronze medalist(s)	112	115	120	6	222
6	Melihcan Günay (TUR)	A	~~93~~	93	~~97~~	7	118	123	126	4	219
7	Mustafa Eliş (TUR)	A	93	96	~~98~~	6	118	~~122~~	~~124~~	7	214
8	Md Ashikur Rahman (BAN)	A	85	90	92	8	95	105	108	8	200

=== 61 kg ===
Rank	Athlete	Group	Snatch (kg)				Clean & Jerk (kg)				Total
Rank	Athlete	Group	1	2	3	Rank	1	2	3	Rank	Total
1st place, gold medalist(s)	Sergio Massidda (ITA)	A	129	~~133~~	~~133~~	1st place, gold medalist(s)	154	156	~~160~~	1st place, gold medalist(s)	285
2nd place, silver medalist(s)	Alexey Drozdov (KAZ)	A	123	126	128	2nd place, silver medalist(s)	150	154	~~158~~	2nd place, silver medalist(s)	282
3rd place, bronze medalist(s)	Vanik Mkhitarian (RUS)	A	115	119	~~123~~	4	140	143	146	4	265
4	Kaan Kahriman (TUR)	A	118	~~122~~	~~122~~	5	130	135	138	9	256
5	Ronnier Martínez (PAN)	A	~~110~~	110	~~113~~	9	135	140	142	6	252
6	Youri Simard (CAN)	B	101	106	110	8	130	136	140	8	250
7	Tehran Mammadov (AZE)	A	110	115	~~117~~	6	130	135	~~137~~	10	250
8	Khusinboy Matrasulov (UZB)	B	108	113	~~116~~	7	127	132	~~136~~	11	245
9	Elzar Taiirov (KGZ)	B	~~107~~	107	~~112~~	10	125	130	~~135~~	12	237
10	Ulaantsetsegiin Amarbayar (MGL)	B	100	~~104~~	104	11	120	124	126	13	230
11	Seth Tom (USA)	B	95	98	~~100~~	12	118	121	124	14	222
12	Konstantinos Lampridis (GRE)	B	92	96	~~98~~	13	115	120	~~125~~	15	216
13	Mohammed Alhrenee (IRQ)	B	~~90~~	93	~~101~~	14	110	~~117~~	~~117~~	16	203
—	Shin Rok (KOR)	A	122	125	~~128~~	3rd place, bronze medalist(s)	~~153~~	~~154~~	~~155~~	—	—
—	Davide Ruiu (ITA)	A	~~125~~	~~125~~	~~126~~	—	143	153	~~157~~	3rd place, bronze medalist(s)	—
—	Caner Toptaş (TUR)	A	~~122~~	~~122~~	~~122~~	—	~~142~~	143	~~153~~	5	—
—	Choi Han-ju (KOR)	A	~~115~~	~~115~~	~~116~~	—	141	~~150~~	~~152~~	7	—
—	Muhammad Faathir (INA)	A	~~115~~	~~115~~	~~115~~	—	~~150~~	~~154~~	~~154~~	—	—
X	Otto Oñate (CUB)	B	Did not start								

=== 67 kg ===
Rank	Athlete	Group	Snatch (kg)				Clean & Jerk (kg)				Total
Rank	Athlete	Group	1	2	3	Rank	1	2	3	Rank	Total
1st place, gold medalist(s)	Muhammed Furkan Özbek (TUR)	A	138	141	~~147~~	1st place, gold medalist(s)	170	173	176	2nd place, silver medalist(s)	317
2nd place, silver medalist(s)	Sairamkez Akmolda (KAZ)	A	~~128~~	128	132	5	171	176	~~187~~	1st place, gold medalist(s)	308
3rd place, bronze medalist(s)	Yusuf Fehmi Genç (TUR)	A	129	~~132~~	133	4	165	168	~~172~~	3rd place, bronze medalist(s)	301
4	Jeremy Lalrinnunga (IND)	A	~~135~~	135	~~139~~	2nd place, silver medalist(s)	160	165	~~170~~	4	300
5	Gor Sahakyan (ARM)	A	125	129	132	6	155	162	~~166~~	5	294
6	Albert Sharkov (RUS)	A	130	~~134~~	134	3rd place, bronze medalist(s)	~~150~~	150	~~155~~	9	284
7	Andrei Fralou (BLR)	B	~~123~~	123	~~127~~	9	150	154	158	6	281
8	Bektimur Reýimow (TKM)	A	128	131	~~133~~	7	150	~~155~~	~~158~~	8	281
9	Ishimbek Muratbek Uulu (KGZ)	B	108	112	116	11	152	~~157~~	157	7	273
10	Murad Aliyev (AZE)	B	122	126	128	8	138	143	~~146~~	11	271
11	Kacper Urban (POL)	B	120	~~124~~	~~124~~	10	140	145	~~152~~	10	265
	Andrea Corbu (ITA)	B	—	—	—	—	—	—	—	—	—

=== 73 kg ===
Rank	Athlete	Group	Snatch (kg)				Clean & Jerk (kg)				Total
Rank	Athlete	Group	1	2	3	Rank	1	2	3	Rank	Total
1st place, gold medalist(s)	Rizki Juniansyah (INA)	A	142	146	155	1st place, gold medalist(s)	180	189	194	1st place, gold medalist(s)	349
2nd place, silver medalist(s)	Achinta Sheuli (IND)	A	137	~~141~~	141	3rd place, bronze medalist(s)	166	169	172	4	313
3rd place, bronze medalist(s)	Gevorg Serobian (RUS)	A	138	143	~~147~~	2nd place, silver medalist(s)	~~160~~	160	165	6	308
4	Fabrizio Veglia (ITA)	B	~~130~~	130	135	6	165	~~171~~	172	3rd place, bronze medalist(s)	307
5	Ramazan Dzhankhotov (RUS)	A	138	~~143~~	~~143~~	5	157	161	165	7	303
6	Gaýgysyz Töräýew (TKM)	A	~~133~~	133	~~139~~	7	164	168	~~173~~	5	301
7	Saikhan Taisuyev (KAZ)	A	120	~~125~~	125	12	170	175	~~184~~	2nd place, silver medalist(s)	300
8	Archil Malakmadze (GEO)	A	~~138~~	139	~~144~~	4	~~155~~	155	—	12	294
9	Ismail Jamali (ESP)	B	125	130	~~135~~	10	153	158	163	9	293
10	Shad Darsigny (CAN)	B	125	~~130~~	131	9	155	~~160~~	160	10	291
11	Omar Javadov (AZE)	B	125	~~130~~	132	8	145	150	~~155~~	13	282
12	Hassan Al-Bahrani (KSA)	B	115	120	~~124~~	14	140	151	155	11	275
13	Žilvinas Žilinskas (LTU)	B	123	~~127~~	~~127~~	13	~~150~~	150	~~155~~	14	273
14	Konrad Łazuga (POL)	B	122	126	128	11	~~142~~	~~142~~	142	15	270
15	Antony Krišto (CRO)	B	95	100	~~105~~	15	117	121	125	16	225
16	Nikola Todorović (CRO)	B	95	100	~~105~~	16	115	120	~~123~~	17	220
	Emir Yildiz (TUR)	A	~~137~~	~~137~~	~~137~~	—	155	160	164	8	—

=== 81 kg ===
Rank	Athlete	Group	Snatch (kg)				Clean & Jerk (kg)				Total
Rank	Athlete	Group	1	2	3	Rank	1	2	3	Rank	Total
1st place, gold medalist(s)	Mukhammadkodir Toshtemirov (UZB)	A	153	161	~~169~~	1st place, gold medalist(s)	182	~~194~~	~~194~~	1st place, gold medalist(s)	343
2nd place, silver medalist(s)	Karen Margaryan (ARM)	A	147	~~151~~	152	2nd place, silver medalist(s)	175	~~177~~	~~180~~	4	327
3rd place, bronze medalist(s)	Khojiakbar Olimov (UZB)	A	141	146	150	4	173	176	~~180~~	3rd place, bronze medalist(s)	326
4	Suren Grigoryan (ARM)	A	143	~~148~~	148	5	~~175~~	~~175~~	175	5	323
5	İsmet Coşkun (TUR)	A	142	148	151	3rd place, bronze medalist(s)	170	~~175~~	~~175~~	8	321
6	Maksym Moskvin (UKR)	A	132	136	138	9	173	~~177~~	177	2nd place, silver medalist(s)	315
7	Artem Gorlov (RUS)	A	137	141	144	6	170	~~175~~	~~175~~	7	314
8	Abdollah Beiranvand (IRI)	A	143	~~149~~	~~152~~	7	162	168	~~172~~	10	311
9	Gabriel Gueli (ITA)	B	133	137	140	8	170	~~176~~	~~176~~	6	310
10	Sebastián Cabala (SVK)	A	133	137	~~141~~	11	167	169	~~175~~	9	306
11	Fugan Aliyev (AZE)	B	130	134	137	10	165	~~170~~	~~174~~	11	302
12	Can Kurnaz (TUR)	A	135	~~140~~	~~140~~	13	165	~~170~~	~~170~~	12	300
13	Sergio Fernandez (ESP)	B	130	135	~~140~~	12	160	~~166~~	~~166~~	13	295
14	David Powell (USA)	B	127	~~132~~	132	14	150	155	~~160~~	16	287
15	Alexander Moiseenko (EST)	B	130	130	~~135~~	15	152	157	~~161~~	14	287
	Dimitrios Tsitlakidis (GRE)	B	~~125~~	~~125~~	~~125~~	—	150	155	~~158~~	15	—

=== 89 kg ===
Rank	Athlete	Group	Snatch (kg)				Clean & Jerk (kg)				Total
Rank	Athlete	Group	1	2	3	Rank	1	2	3	Rank	Total
1st place, gold medalist(s)	Tudor Bratu (MDA)	A	150	~~155~~	155	2nd place, silver medalist(s)	185	189	191	1st place, gold medalist(s)	346
2nd place, silver medalist(s)	Maksim Moguchev (RUS)	A	148	153	~~157~~	4	182	188	~~194~~	3rd place, bronze medalist(s)	341
3rd place, bronze medalist(s)	Oleh Nikolaienko (UKR)	A	153	156	158	1st place, gold medalist(s)	176	181	~~185~~	6	339
4	Raphael Friedrich (GER)	A	150	~~154~~	154	3rd place, bronze medalist(s)	184	~~187~~	~~187~~	4	338
5	Neiser Grefa (ECU)	B	~~135~~	~~141~~	141	11	180	184	190	2nd place, silver medalist(s)	331
6	Khakimjon Shamshidinov (UZB)	A	146	146	~~156~~	9	175	182	~~190~~	5	328
7	Fabio Pizzolato (ITA)	A	145	149	~~151~~	5	170	178	~~182~~	9	327
8	Daniel Kuzmichev (RUS)	A	143	146	~~149~~	8	181	181	~~189~~	7	327
9	Lomia Tebidze (GEO)	B	143	147	~~150~~	6	177	~~183~~	~~183~~	10	324
10	Georgios Iordanidis (GRE)	A	~~140~~	140	145	10	175	~~180~~	~~180~~	12	320
11	William Easley (USA)	B	132	136	~~140~~	12	168	173	178	8	314
12	Şerzad Rustambaýew (TKM)	B	135	~~140~~	~~140~~	13	~~170~~	171	177	11	312
13	Valijon Sharipov (UZB)	B	~~127~~	127	~~133~~	15	158	163	170	13	297
14	Edward Wells (USA)	B	~~125~~	125	130	14	154	159	~~163~~	14	289
15	Randalyn Barsbold (MGL)	B	108	113	~~116~~	16	126	~~132~~	~~132~~	15	239
	Cristiano Ficco (ITA)	A	147	~~154~~	~~155~~	7	~~190~~	~~190~~	~~193~~	—	—

=== 96 kg ===
Rank	Athlete	Group	Snatch (kg)				Clean & Jerk (kg)				Total
Rank	Athlete	Group	1	2	3	Rank	1	2	3	Rank	Total
1st place, gold medalist(s)	Garik Karapetyan (ARM)	A	155	158	162	2nd place, silver medalist(s)	188	193	—	2nd place, silver medalist(s)	355
2nd place, silver medalist(s)	Artur Babayan (RUS)	A	160	163	~~166~~	1st place, gold medalist(s)	186	191	~~197~~	3rd place, bronze medalist(s)	354
3rd place, bronze medalist(s)	Illia Moskalenko (UKR)	A	148	151	155	5	~~185~~	189	194	1st place, gold medalist(s)	349
4	Hossein Beiranvand (IRI)	A	150	155	157	3rd place, bronze medalist(s)	186	~~192~~	~~192~~	6	343
5	Ilia Lunin (RUS)	A	149	154	156	4	178	185	~~190~~	7	341
6	Maksym Dombrovskyi (UKR)	A	~~149~~	149	~~154~~	6	~~187~~	187	~~194~~	4	336
7	Morgan McCullough (USA)	B	135	~~140~~	140	12	180	186	~~190~~	5	326
8	Patryk Sawulski (POL)	B	145	~~152~~	~~152~~	8	~~175~~	175	~~185~~	8	320
9	Hamada Mohammed (PLE)	B	136	141	~~145~~	9	171	~~175~~	~~176~~	10	312
10	Mangosong D'Agostino (USA)	B	130	135	140	11	165	~~170~~	172	9	312
11	Camilo Zapata (CHI)	B	135	140	~~143~~	10	165	170	~~175~~	11	310
12	Mohammed Al-Qasimi (UAE)	B	120	125	~~131~~	14	150	155	~~160~~	12	280
13	Dino Đale (CRO)	B	~~130~~	~~130~~	130	13	145	~~155~~	~~155~~	13	275
	Ali Al-Othman (KSA)	A	~~148~~	148	~~155~~	7	~~187~~	~~192~~	~~192~~	—	—
X	[[]] (LAT)	A				X				X	
X	[[]] (POL)	A				X				X	

=== 102 kg ===
Rank	Athlete	Group	Snatch (kg)				Clean & Jerk (kg)				Total
Rank	Athlete	Group	1	2	3	Rank	1	2	3	Rank	Total
1st place, gold medalist(s)	Rakhat Bekbolat (KAZ)	A	166	171	175	1st place, gold medalist(s)	~~202~~	202	~~209~~	1st place, gold medalist(s)	377
2nd place, silver medalist(s)	Vasil Marinov (BUL)	A	165	170	~~175~~	2nd place, silver medalist(s)	200	~~208~~	~~208~~	2nd place, silver medalist(s)	370
3rd place, bronze medalist(s)	Zaza Lomtadze (GEO)	A	152	157	~~161~~	4	194	~~201~~	~~201~~	3rd place, bronze medalist(s)	351
4	Siarhei Sharankou (BLR)	A	153	158	162	3rd place, bronze medalist(s)	181	188	~~193~~	5	350
5	Kurbonmurod Nomozov (UZB)	A	146	151	~~155~~	7	~~182~~	182	191	4	342
6	Dmytro Kurdybakha (UKR)	A	150	153	~~155~~	5	180	184	~~191~~	6	337
7	Ali Shukurlu (AZE)	A	146	152	~~158~~	6	175	180	—	7	332
8	James Shriver (USA)	A	130	135	140	9	170	175	180	8	320
9	Matthew Hammell (USA)	A	125	128	131	10	150	~~156~~	156	9	287
	Petros Petrosyan (ARM)	A	145	~~150~~	150	8	~~195~~	~~195~~	~~195~~	—	—

=== 109 kg ===
Rank	Athlete	Group	Snatch (kg)				Clean & Jerk (kg)				Total
Rank	Athlete	Group	1	2	3	Rank	1	2	3	Rank	Total
1st place, gold medalist(s)	Hristo Hristov (BUL)	A	180	~~186~~	187	2nd place, silver medalist(s)	211	216	~~223~~	1st place, gold medalist(s)	403
2nd place, silver medalist(s)	Bohdan Hoza (UKR)	A	181	~~187~~	189	1st place, gold medalist(s)	201	~~208~~	213	2nd place, silver medalist(s)	402
3rd place, bronze medalist(s)	Daniil Vagaitsev (RUS)	A	170	175	~~180~~	3rd place, bronze medalist(s)	200	207	212	3rd place, bronze medalist(s)	387
4	Akaki Talakhadze (GEO)	A	153	158	161	5	195	201	~~208~~	4	362
5	Mirkhosil Mirzavaev (UZB)	A	157	161	~~164~~	4	~~185~~	185	~~194~~	5	346
6	Igor Osuch (POL)	A	145	150	153	6	170	177	~~182~~	6	330
7	Artiom Grițenco (MDA)	A	135	140	145	7	~~160~~	160	170	7	315

=== +109 kg ===
Rank	Athlete	Group	Snatch (kg)				Clean & Jerk (kg)				Total
Rank	Athlete	Group	1	2	3	Rank	1	2	3	Rank	Total
1st place, gold medalist(s)	Enzo Kuworge (NED)	A	174	178	180	1st place, gold medalist(s)	220	225	231	1st place, gold medalist(s)	411
2nd place, silver medalist(s)	Reza Hassanpour (IRI)	A	165	172	~~176~~	3rd place, bronze medalist(s)	210	221	226	2nd place, silver medalist(s)	398
3rd place, bronze medalist(s)	Alireza Zandi (IRI)	A	161	170	173	2nd place, silver medalist(s)	205	221	~~226~~	3rd place, bronze medalist(s)	394
4	Ahmad Alali (SYR)	A	151	156	~~161~~	5	191	201	206	4	362
5	Tornike Tabatadze (GEO)	A	150	160	171	4	~~190~~	~~190~~	190	8	361
6	Yevhen Burbala (UKR)	A	152	156	~~160~~	6	192	196	202	5	358
7	Cebrail Acar (TUR)	A	155	~~162~~	~~162~~	8	190	195	~~200~~	6	350
8	Olaf Pasikowski (POL)	A	~~150~~	150	156	7	180	~~185~~	186	10	342
9	Hassan Al-Radhi (KSA)	A	145	152	~~157~~	9	183	186	~~191~~	9	338
10	Atajan Daýyýew (TKM)	A	145	~~149~~	~~151~~	10	~~180~~	180	190	7	335

== Women's results ==
Green denotes athletes who can't compete in championships because they were born before 2001, but they compete as "extra athletes" to get results counted for the qualifications for 2020 Summer Olympics.

=== 45 kg ===
Rank	Athlete	Group	Snatch (kg)				Clean & Jerk (kg)				Total
Rank	Athlete	Group	1	2	3	Rank	1	2	3	Rank	Total
1st place, gold medalist(s)	Cansu Bektaş (TUR)	A	65	67	70	1st place, gold medalist(s)	80	84	~~87~~	1st place, gold medalist(s)	154
2nd place, silver medalist(s)	Melisa Güneş (TUR)	A	65	67	69	2nd place, silver medalist(s)	78	80	~~84~~	3rd place, bronze medalist(s)	149
3rd place, bronze medalist(s)	Teodora-Luminița Hîncu (MDA)	A	62	64	66	4	74	77	79	4	145
4	Lada Latushkina (RUS)	A	64	66	68	3rd place, bronze medalist(s)	74	76	~~78~~	5	144
5	Najla Khoirunnisa (INA)	A	~~60~~	62	~~66~~	5	~~75~~	75	~~79~~	6	137
—	Cosmina Pană (ROU)	A	~~63~~	~~63~~	~~63~~	—	78	80	84	2nd place, silver medalist(s)	—

=== 49 kg ===
Rank	Athlete	Group	Snatch (kg)				Clean & Jerk (kg)				Total
Rank	Athlete	Group	1	2	3	Rank	1	2	3	Rank	Total
1st place, gold medalist(s)	Windy Cantika Aisah (INA)	A	82	86	~~88~~	1st place, gold medalist(s)	100	105	~~107~~	1st place, gold medalist(s)	191
2nd place, silver medalist(s)	Mihaela Cambei (ROU)	A	81	84	86	2nd place, silver medalist(s)	96	~~99~~	99	2nd place, silver medalist(s)	185
3rd place, bronze medalist(s)	Elizaveta Zhatkina (RUS)	A	68	~~71~~	71	4	88	92	94	3rd place, bronze medalist(s)	165
4	Milana Kutiakina (RUS)	A	68	70	~~72~~	7	88	91	~~96~~	4	161
5	Siti Nafisatul Hariroh (INA)	A	70	~~73~~	~~73~~	6	90	~~94~~	~~96~~	5	160
6	Martina Bomben (ITA)	A	68	~~71~~	71	5	~~88~~	~~88~~	88	6	159
—	Giulia Imperio (ITA)	A	80	85	~~87~~	3rd place, bronze medalist(s)	~~95~~	~~95~~	~~95~~	—	—
X	Manuela Berrío (COL)	A	76	~~79~~	~~79~~	X	95	98	101	X	177

=== 55 kg ===
Rank	Athlete	Group	Snatch (kg)				Clean & Jerk (kg)				Total
Rank	Athlete	Group	1	2	3	Rank	1	2	3	Rank	Total
1st place, gold medalist(s)	Kamila Konotop (UKR)	A	89	93	96	1st place, gold medalist(s)	108	113	116	1st place, gold medalist(s)	212
2nd place, silver medalist(s)	Nina Sterckx (BEL)	A	85	88	90	2nd place, silver medalist(s)	102	~~108~~	108	2nd place, silver medalist(s)	198
3rd place, bronze medalist(s)	Andreea Cotruţa (ROU)	A	83	~~86~~	~~86~~	3rd place, bronze medalist(s)	101	~~105~~	105	4	188
4	Duygu Alıcı (TUR)	A	78	81	83	5	100	102	104	5	187
5	Olha Ivzhenko (UKR)	A	80	83	~~86~~	4	98	~~101~~	102	6	185
6	Juliana Klarisa (INA)	A	80	~~84~~	~~84~~	6	105	~~109~~	~~109~~	3rd place, bronze medalist(s)	185
7	Nigora Abdullaeva (UZB)	A	76	~~79~~	79	7	92	96	99	7	178
8	Emily Estep (USA)	A	74	77	~~80~~	8	94	97	~~100~~	8	174
9	Annelien Vandenabeele (BEL)	A	~~73~~	73	76	9	90	94	~~97~~	9	170
10	Elena Tzatzollari (GRE)	A	~~67~~	~~67~~	67	10	80	84	~~87~~	10	151
—	Marjia Akter (BAN)	A	63	~~67~~	~~67~~	11	—	—	—	—	—

=== 59 kg ===
Rank	Athlete	Group	Snatch (kg)				Clean & Jerk (kg)				Total
Rank	Athlete	Group	1	2	3	Rank	1	2	3	Rank	Total
1st place, gold medalist(s)	Ghofrane Belkhir (TUN)	A	87	91	—	1st place, gold medalist(s)	112	~~120~~	120	1st place, gold medalist(s)	211
2nd place, silver medalist(s)	Cansel Özkan (TUR)	A	85	87	90	2nd place, silver medalist(s)	~~104~~	104	~~107~~	7	194
3rd place, bronze medalist(s)	Chiara Piccinno (ITA)	A	~~85~~	~~85~~	86	3rd place, bronze medalist(s)	102	104	106	6	192
4	Alina Zakharchenko (UKR)	A	82	85	~~86~~	4	100	104	106	5	191
5	Monika Szymanek (POL)	A	77	~~80~~	80	9	106	109	111	2nd place, silver medalist(s)	191
6	Nelly (INA)	A	80	~~83~~	~~83~~	8	105	108	110	3rd place, bronze medalist(s)	190
7	Jenifer Becerra (ECU)	A	~~82~~	82	~~86~~	6	102	106	~~109~~	4	188
8	Svitlana Samuliak (UKR)	A	82	~~84~~	84	5	96	99	101	9	185
9	Faith Garza (USA)	B	70	74	77	10	97	101	~~104~~	8	178
10	Maria Kardara (GRE)	B	78	81	~~84~~	7	92	95	~~98~~	10	176
11	Nina Ladvenicová (SVK)	B	66	69	~~71~~	11	85	88	90	12	159
12	Robine Verhaegen (BEL)	B	64	~~67~~	67	12	85	88	91	11	158
13	Magdeline Moyengwa (BOT)	B	~~60~~	62	65	13	70	75	—	13	140
14	Gini Rany (BAN)	B	53	56	~~61~~	14	60	~~70~~	70	14	126

=== 64 kg ===
Rank	Athlete	Group	Snatch (kg)				Clean & Jerk (kg)				Total
Rank	Athlete	Group	1	2	3	Rank	1	2	3	Rank	Total
1st place, gold medalist(s)	Raluca Olaru (ROU)	A	94	~~98~~	98	1st place, gold medalist(s)	114	~~116~~	116	1st place, gold medalist(s)	214
2nd place, silver medalist(s)	Giulia Miserendino (ITA)	A	93	97	~~99~~	2nd place, silver medalist(s)	110	~~113~~	~~113~~	6	207
3rd place, bronze medalist(s)	Gulnur Ybray (KAZ)	A	87	~~90~~	90	7	110	~~114~~	115	2nd place, silver medalist(s)	205
4	Restu Anggi (INA)	A	85	~~89~~	90	6	107	~~111~~	114	3rd place, bronze medalist(s)	204
5	Chaima Rahmouni (TUN)	A	86	~~90~~	92	3rd place, bronze medalist(s)	~~108~~	111	~~115~~	5	203
6	Mariia Gruzdova (RUS)	A	84	87	~~89~~	8	103	108	112	4	199
7	Wiktoria Wołk (POL)	A	88	91	~~93~~	4	~~107~~	107	~~111~~	8	198
8	Marie Mantaropoulos (FRA)	B	85	88	90	5	99	~~103~~	103	10	193
9	Antonia Ackermann (GER)	B	82	~~85~~	85	9	103	107	~~109~~	7	192
10	Madinabonu Djuraeva (UZB)	B	78	81	~~83~~	11	97	101	103	9	184
11	Haley Trinh (USA)	B	72	75	78	12	96	100	~~103~~	11	178
12	Ganzorigiin Bolortuya (MGL)	B	~~68~~	68	~~72~~	13	78	85	~~94~~	12	153
13	Farjana Riya (BAN)	B	60	~~65~~	~~65~~	14	72	76	~~79~~	13	136
	Rienna Skelton (CAN)	B	80	83	~~86~~	10	~~100~~	—	—	—	—

=== 71 kg ===
Rank	Athlete	Group	Snatch (kg)				Clean & Jerk (kg)				Total
Rank	Athlete	Group	1	2	3	Rank	1	2	3	Rank	Total
1st place, gold medalist(s)	Olivia Reeves (USA)	A	~~98~~	98	102	2nd place, silver medalist(s)	122	127	~~130~~	1st place, gold medalist(s)	229
2nd place, silver medalist(s)	Kumushkhon Fayzullaeva (UZB)	A	97	100	103	1st place, gold medalist(s)	'122;	~~127~~	~~128~~	2nd place, silver medalist(s)	225
3rd place, bronze medalist(s)	Evgeniia Guseva (RUS)	A	96	99	102	3rd place, bronze medalist(s)	120	~~125~~	~~125~~	3rd place, bronze medalist(s)	222
4	Aysel Özkan (TUR)	A	95	98	101	4	111	116	~~120~~	5	217
5	Zarina Gusalova (RUS)	A	~~96~~	96	~~101~~	5	115	~~120~~	~~122~~	5	211
6	Milena Khachatryan (ARM)	A	89	92	~~96~~	6	100	~~116~~	117	4	209
7	Aino Luostarinen (FIN)	A	87	~~90~~	~~90~~	8	113	~~118~~	~~121~~	7	200
8	Yevheniia Rosinska (UKR)	A	83	85	87	9	106	109	111	8	198
9	Merna Hasan (SYR)	A	84	88	~~90~~	7	~~105~~	107	~~117~~	9	195
10	Andżelika Kaczmarczyk (POL)	A	~~83~~	83	86	10	106	~~111~~	~~111~~	12	192
11	Victoria Steiner (AUT)	B	78	~~82~~	83	12	100	104	106	11	189
12	Natalie Andrews (USA)	B	80	82	84	11	100	~~103~~	104	13	188
13	Mashkhura Rustamova (UZB)	B	73	~~77~~	~~78~~	13	94	98	101	14	174
	Gombosürengiin Enerel (MGL)	B	~~85~~	~~85~~	~~85~~	—	~~103~~	103	106	10	—
	Theodora Antoniadou (GRE)	B	~~76~~	~~76~~	~~76~~	—	90	~~94~~	~~94~~	15	—

=== 76 kg ===
Rank	Athlete	Group	Snatch (kg)				Clean & Jerk (kg)				Total
Rank	Athlete	Group	1	2	3	Rank	1	2	3	Rank	Total
1st place, gold medalist(s)	Iana Sotieva (RUS)	A	100	105	108	1st place, gold medalist(s)	120	125	—	1st place, gold medalist(s)	233
2nd place, silver medalist(s)	Bella Paredes (ECU)	A	91	95	98	3rd place, bronze medalist(s)	112	116	119	2nd place, silver medalist(s)	217
3rd place, bronze medalist(s)	Ryna Litoshyk (BLR)	A	93	96	98	4	115	117	~~120~~	3rd place, bronze medalist(s)	215
4	Arveta McElderry (USA)	A	94	97	99	2nd place, silver medalist(s)	~~113~~	115	~~119~~	4	214
5	Ekaterina Vizgina (RUS)	A	84	88	~~90~~	7	105	109	112	5	200
6	Annalee Smith (USA)	A	85	88	90	6	105	~~108~~	109	6	199
7	Mari Jaghli (SYR)	A	~~85~~	85	~~91~~	9	104	108	~~111~~	7	193
8	Elnaz Bajalani (IRI)	A	85	~~91~~	92	5	100	~~106~~	~~107~~	9	192
9	İldem Gerçekden (TUR)	A	83	87	~~90~~	8	95	103	~~105~~	8	190
10	Mai Almadani (UAE)	A	58	61	63	11	75	~~77~~	77	10	140
	Milena Rutkowska (POL)	A	81	84	~~86~~	10	~~104~~	~~104~~	~~105~~	—	—

=== 81 kg ===
Rank	Athlete	Group	Snatch (kg)				Clean & Jerk (kg)				Total
Rank	Athlete	Group	1	2	3	Rank	1	2	3	Rank	Total
1st place, gold medalist(s)	Liana Gyurjyan (ARM)	A	90	95	98	2nd place, silver medalist(s)	117	121	125	1st place, gold medalist(s)	223
2nd place, silver medalist(s)	Dilara Uçan (TUR)	A	95	97	99	1st place, gold medalist(s)	115	119	123	3rd place, bronze medalist(s)	222
3rd place, bronze medalist(s)	Kelin Jiménez (ECU)	A	89	91	94	3rd place, bronze medalist(s)	116	120	124	2nd place, silver medalist(s)	218
4	Dziana Minkova (BLR)	A	86	90	93	4	115	~~120~~	120	4	213
5	Estrella Saldarriaga (PER)	A	~~83~~	83	86	6	105	110	~~113~~	5	196
6	Viktória Boros (HUN)	A	85	90	~~92~~	5	105	105	~~110~~	7	195
7	Alexandra Thornton (USA)	A	85	~~88~~	~~89~~	7	100	105	110	6	195

=== 87 kg ===
Rank	Athlete	Group	Snatch (kg)				Clean & Jerk (kg)				Total
Rank	Athlete	Group	1	2	3	Rank	1	2	3	Rank	Total
1st place, gold medalist(s)	Tursunoy Jabborova (UZB)	A	103	108	111	1st place, gold medalist(s)	122	129	133	1st place, gold medalist(s)	244
2nd place, silver medalist(s)	Avery Owens (USA)	A	88	91	93	2nd place, silver medalist(s)	110	115	118	2nd place, silver medalist(s)	211
3rd place, bronze medalist(s)	Yekta Jamali (IRI)	A	85	90	92	3rd place, bronze medalist(s)	105	111	116	3rd place, bronze medalist(s)	208
4	Agnieszka Rak (POL)	A	86	90	~~93~~	4	106	110	~~114~~	5	200
5	Sara Yenigün (TUR)	A	88	~~91~~	~~93~~	6	110	~~116~~	~~117~~	4	198
6	Denise Robles (USA)	A	~~86~~	86	90	5	103	107	~~111~~	7	197
7	Fatmagül Çevik (TUR)	A	84	~~89~~	~~91~~	7	100	108	~~113~~	6	192
8	Salome Manumua (TGA)	A	65	~~68~~	~~68~~	8	75	80	85	8	150

=== +87 kg ===
Rank	Athlete	Group	Snatch (kg)				Clean & Jerk (kg)				Total
Rank	Athlete	Group	1	2	3	Rank	1	2	3	Rank	Total
1st place, gold medalist(s)	Aisamal Sansyzbayeva (KAZ)	A	105	109	113	1st place, gold medalist(s)	135	140	145	1st place, gold medalist(s)	258
2nd place, silver medalist(s)	Viktoriia Orlova (RUS)	A	95	100	105	2nd place, silver medalist(s)	120	125	130	2nd place, silver medalist(s)	235
3rd place, bronze medalist(s)	Emma Friesen (CAN)	A	95	~~99~~	100	3rd place, bronze medalist(s)	115	~~120~~	~~122~~	4	215
4	Nuran Yalçın (TUR)	A	85	88	~~91~~	4	113	116	121	3rd place, bronze medalist(s)	209
	Arantzazu Pavez (CHI)	A	~~93~~	~~93~~	~~93~~	—	—	—	—	—	—
