= 2022 European Junior & U23 Weightlifting Championships =

International weightlifting competition

2022 European Junior & U23 Weightlifting Championship
- Venue: Ramazan Njala Sports Palace
- Location: Durrës, Albania
- Dates: 15–25 October

The 2022 European Junior & U23 Weightlifting Championships (49th in Junior and 13th in U23) took place in Durrës, Albania from 15 to 25 October 2022.

== Team ranking ==
Rank	Men's Junior		Women's Junior		Men's Under-23		Women's Under-23	
Rank	Team	Points	Team	Points	Team	Points	Team	Points
1	Armenia	660	Poland	523	Georgia	531	Poland	398
2	Georgia	619	Ukraine	481	Poland	402	Finland	380
3	Turkey	522	Armenia	451	Armenia	328	Ukraine	304
4	Azerbaijan	413	Romania	419	Ukraine	325	Romania	292
5	Ukraine	356	Turkey	417	Romania	324	Turkey	259
6	Poland	343	Germany	337	Czech Republic	262	Albania	226

== Medal table ==
=== Big ===
Ranking by Big (Total result) medals

* Host nation (Albania)

Rank	Nation	Gold	Silver	Bronze	Total
1	Armenia	7	4	4	15
2	Turkey	6	7	3	16
3	Ukraine	4	5	2	11
4	Romania	4	4	2	10
5	Georgia	4	3	2	9
6	Italy	4	2	2	8
7	Moldova	2	0	0	2
8	Germany	1	2	3	6
9	Azerbaijan	1	2	0	3
10	Slovakia	1	1	1	3
11	Great Britain	1	1	0	2
12	Austria	1	0	1	2
12	Hungary	1	0	1	2
14	Belgium	1	0	0	1
14	Iceland	1	0	0	1
14	Netherlands	1	0	0	1
17	Poland	0	3	6	9
18	France	0	1	2	3
18	Spain	0	1	2	3
20	Latvia	0	1	1	2
20	Serbia	0	1	1	2
22	Bulgaria	0	1	0	1
22	Finland	0	1	0	1
24	Czech Republic	0	0	3	3
25	Greece	0	0	2	2
26	Sweden	0	0	1	1
Totals (26 entries)		40	40	39	119

=== Big and Small ===
Ranking by all medals: Big (Total result) and Small (Snatch and Clean & Jerk)

* Host nation (Albania)

Rank	Nation	Gold	Silver	Bronze	Total
1	Armenia	20	12	13	45
2	Turkey	19	20	7	46
3	Italy	13	4	5	22
4	Ukraine	12	14	9	35
5	Romania	9	14	10	33
6	Georgia	9	13	6	28
7	Moldova	6	0	0	6
8	Slovakia	4	3	4	11
9	Austria	4	1	2	7
10	Germany	3	6	6	15
11	Azerbaijan	3	4	2	9
12	Great Britain	3	3	1	7
13	Belgium	3	0	0	3
13	Iceland	3	0	0	3
13	Netherlands	3	0	0	3
16	Poland	2	9	17	28
17	Hungary	2	1	2	5
18	France	1	3	3	7
19	Bulgaria	1	2	1	4
20	Spain	0	4	3	7
21	Finland	0	3	0	3
22	Serbia	0	2	5	7
23	Greece	0	1	5	6
24	Latvia	0	1	4	5
25	Czech Republic	0	0	5	5
26	Sweden	0	0	4	4
27	Albania*	0	0	1	1
27	Denmark	0	0	1	1
27	Israel	0	0	1	1
Totals (29 entries)		120	120	117	357

== Juniors ==
=== Men ===
Event	Gold		Silver		Bronze	
55 kg
Snatch	Garnik Cholakyan (ARM)	107 kg	Florin Krupla (ROU)	105 kg	Cosmin Isofache (ROU)	105 kg
Clean & Jerk	Federico La Barbera (ITA)	128 kg	Cosmin Isofache (ROU)	127 kg	Florin Krupla (ROU)	126 kg
Total	Cosmin Isofache (ROU)	232 kg	Florin Krupla (ROU)	231 kg	Federico La Barbera (ITA)	228 kg
61 kg
Snatch	Sergio Massidda (ITA)	125 kg	Tehran Mammadov (AZE)	120 kg	Rafik Minasyan (ARM)	116 kg
Clean & Jerk	Sergio Massidda (ITA)	155 kg	Konstantinos Lampridis (GRE)	143 kg	Tehran Mammadov (AZE)	141 kg
Total	Sergio Massidda (ITA)	280 kg	Tehran Mammadov (AZE)	261 kg	Rafik Minasyan (ARM)	256 kg
67 kg
Snatch	Kaan Kahriman (TUR)	137 kg	Gor Sahakyan (ARM)	134 kg	Yusuf Fehmi Genç (TUR)	131 kg
Clean & Jerk	Yusuf Fehmi Genç (TUR)	167 kg	Gor Sahakyan (ARM)	167 kg	Gurami Giorbelidze (GEO)	160 kg
Total	Gor Sahakyan (ARM)	301 kg	Yusuf Fehmi Genç (TUR)	298 kg	Kaan Kahriman (TUR)	293 kg
73 kg
Snatch	Sebastián Cabala (SVK)	141 kg	Omar Javadov (AZE)	140 kg	Tiberiu Donose (ROU)	139 kg
Clean & Jerk	Sebastián Cabala (SVK)	168 kg	Ismail Jamali (ESP)	167 kg	Mark Lievanzov (UKR)	166 kg
Total	Sebastián Cabala (SVK)	309 kg	Omar Javadov (AZE)	305 kg	Ismail Jamali (ESP)	305 kg
81 kg
Snatch	Hmayak Misakyan (AUT)	147 kg	Saba Asanidze (GEO)	146 kg	Lorenzo Tarquini (ITA)	145 kg
Clean & Jerk	Saba Asanidze (GEO)	182 kg	Mnatsakan Abrahamyan (ARM)	180 kg	Lorenzo Tarquini (ITA)	178 kg
Total	Saba Asanidze (GEO)	328 kg	Lorenzo Tarquini (ITA)	323 kg	Mnatsakan Abrahamyan (ARM)	323 kg
89 kg
Snatch	Hakan Şükrü Kurnaz (TUR)	157 kg	Suren Grigoryan (ARM)	155 kg	Ulaş Can Kurnaz (TUR)	155 kg
Clean & Jerk	Suren Grigoryan (ARM)	185 kg	Gevorg Ghahramanyan (ARM)	185 kg	Ulaş Can Kurnaz (TUR)	184 kg
Total	Suren Grigoryan (ARM)	340 kg	Ulaş Can Kurnaz (TUR)	339 kg	Hakan Şükrü Kurnaz (TUR)	337 kg
96 kg
Snatch	Garik Karapetyan (ARM)	171 kg	Oleh Nikolaienko (UKR)	153 kg	Joen Vikingsson Sjöblom (SWE)	150 kg
Clean & Jerk	Garik Karapetyan (ARM)	196 kg	Emre Öztürk (TUR)	191 kg	Joen Vikingsson Sjöblom (SWE)	181 kg
Total	Garik Karapetyan (ARM)	367 kg	Emre Öztürk (TUR)	340 kg	Joen Vikingsson Sjöblom (SWE)	331 kg
102 kg
Snatch	Tudor Bratu (MDA)	170 kg	Petros Petrosyan (ARM)	160 kg	Gurami Vekua (GEO)	153 kg
Clean & Jerk	Tudor Bratu (MDA)	202 kg	Petros Petrosyan (ARM)	200 kg	Volodymyr Marchuk (UKR)	195 kg
Total	Tudor Bratu (MDA)	372 kg	Petros Petrosyan (ARM)	360 kg	Volodymyr Marchuk (UKR)	347 kg
109 kg
Snatch	Onur Demirci (TUR)	163 kg	Mykyta Rubanovskyi (UKR)	162 kg	Ali Shukurlu (AZE)	161 kg
Clean & Jerk	Mykyta Rubanovskyi (UKR)	198 kg	Onur Demirci (TUR)	196 kg	Giorgi Kirvalidze (GEO)	194 kg
Total	Mykyta Rubanovskyi (UKR)	360 kg	Onur Demirci (TUR)	359 kg	Giorgi Kirvalidze (GEO)	351 kg
+109 kg
Snatch	Ali Oflaz (TUR)	161 kg	Vladimír Macura (SVK)	160 kg	Yevhen Burbala (UKR)	159 kg
Clean & Jerk	Yevhen Burbala (UKR)	201 kg	Ali Oflaz (TUR)	201 kg	Vladimír Macura (SVK)	183 kg
Total	Ali Oflaz (TUR)	362 kg	Yevhen Burbala (UKR)	360 kg	Vladimír Macura (SVK)	343 kg

=== Women ===
Event	Gold		Silver		Bronze	
45 kg
Snatch	Cansu Bektaş (TUR)	70 kg	Marta García (ESP)	67 kg	Ruth Fuentefría (ESP)	66 kg
Clean & Jerk	Cansu Bektaş (TUR)	87 kg	Marta García (ESP)	81 kg	Ioana Miron (ROU)	78 kg
Total	Cansu Bektaş (TUR)	157 kg	Marta García (ESP)	148 kg	Ruth Fuentefría (ESP)	143 kg
49 kg
Snatch	Mihaela Cambei (ROU)	87 kg	Mariam Maisuradze (GEO)	70 kg	Martina Bomben (ITA)	69 kg
Clean & Jerk	Mihaela Cambei (ROU)	102 kg	Oliwia Drzazga (POL)	88 kg	Mariam Maisuradze (GEO)	88 kg
Total	Mihaela Cambei (ROU)	189 kg	Mariam Maisuradze (GEO)	158 kg	Martina Bomben (ITA)	156 kg
55 kg
Snatch	Nina Sterckx (BEL)	95 kg	Andreea Cotruţa (ROU)	89 kg	Svitlana Samuliak (UKR)	85 kg
Clean & Jerk	Nina Sterckx (BEL)	118 kg WJR	Andreea Cotruţa (ROU)	112 kg	Annika Pilz (GER)	101 kg
Total	Nina Sterckx (BEL)	213 kg WJR	Andreea Cotruţa (ROU)	201 kg	Annika Pilz (GER)	185 kg
59 kg
Snatch	Olha Ivzhenko (UKR)	91 kg	Alina Zakharchenko (UKR)	88 kg	Monika Szymanek (POL)	80 kg
Clean & Jerk	Olha Ivzhenko (UKR)	107 kg	Monika Szymanek (POL)	102 kg	Alina Zakharchenko (UKR)	101 kg
Total	Olha Ivzhenko (UKR)	198 kg	Alina Zakharchenko (UKR)	189 kg	Monika Szymanek (POL)	182 kg
64 kg
Snatch	Antonia Ackermann (GER)	93 kg	Martyna Dołęga (POL)	90 kg	Marie Mantaropoulos (FRA)	89 kg
Clean & Jerk	Marie Mantaropoulos (FRA)	114 kg	Anca Grosu (ROU)	114 kg	Antonia Ackermann (GER)	113 kg
Total	Antonia Ackermann (GER)	206 kg	Marie Mantaropoulos (FRA)	203 kg	Martyna Dołęga (POL)	201 kg
71 kg
Snatch	Giulia Miserendino (ITA)	106 kg	Monika Marach (POL)	100 kg	Aysel Özkan (TUR)	94 kg
Clean & Jerk	Giulia Miserendino (ITA)	120 kg	Aysel Özkan (TUR)	115 kg	Monika Marach (POL)	114 kg
Total	Giulia Miserendino (ITA)	226 kg	Monika Marach (POL)	214 kg	Aysel Özkan (TUR)	209 kg
76 kg
Snatch	Milena Khachatryan (ARM)	99 kg	Dilara Uçan (TUR)	98 kg	Daniela Ivanova (LAT)	97 kg
Clean & Jerk	Milena Khachatryan (ARM)	120 kg	Dilara Uçan (TUR)	120 kg	Daniela Ivanova (LAT)	118 kg
Total	Milena Khachatryan (ARM)	219 kg	Dilara Uçan (TUR)	218 kg	Daniela Ivanova (LAT)	215 kg
81 kg
Snatch	Liana Gyurjyan (ARM)	98 kg	Mariam Murgvliani (GEO)	94 kg	Emma Poghosyan (ARM)	94 kg
Clean & Jerk	Liana Gyurjyan (ARM)	125 kg	Emma Poghosyan (ARM)	121 kg	Lenka Žembová (SVK)	108 kg
Total	Liana Gyurjyan (ARM)	223 kg	Emma Poghosyan (ARM)	215 kg	Mariam Murgvliani (GEO)	201 kg
87 kg
Snatch	Sara Yenigün (TUR)	95 kg	Natia Gadelia (GEO)	94 kg	Meri Tumasyan (ARM)	92 kg
Clean & Jerk	Sara Yenigün (TUR)	123 kg	Natia Gadelia (GEO)	115 kg	Meri Tumasyan (ARM)	113 kg
Total	Sara Yenigün (TUR)	218 kg	Natia Gadelia (GEO)	209 kg	Meri Tumasyan (ARM)	205 kg
+87 kg
Snatch	Julieta Avanesyan (ARM)	95 kg	Aleyna Kaymaz (TUR)	93 kg	Johanna Pfeilstöcker (AUT)	91 kg
Clean & Jerk	Aleyna Kaymaz (TUR)	121 kg	Johanna Pfeilstöcker (AUT)	114 kg	Martyna Narewska (POL)	113 kg
Total	Aleyna Kaymaz (TUR)	214 kg	Julieta Avanesyan (ARM)	206 kg	Johanna Pfeilstöcker (AUT)	205 kg

== Under-23 ==
=== Men ===
Event	Gold		Silver		Bronze	
55 kg
Snatch	Valentin Iancu (ROU)	106 kg	Marian Luca (ROU)	105 kg	Not awarded	
Clean & Jerk	Valentin Iancu (ROU)	135 kg	Marian Luca (ROU)	120 kg	Not awarded	
Total	Valentin Iancu (ROU)	241 kg	Marian Luca (ROU)	225 kg	Not awarded	
61 kg
Snatch	Ramazan Kara (TUR)	116 kg	Stefan Vladisavljev (SRB)	110 kg	František Polák (CZE)	109 kg
Clean & Jerk	Angel Rusev (BUL)	146 kg	Ramazan Kara (TUR)	145 kg	Stefan Vladisavljev (SRB)	136 kg
Total	Ramazan Kara (TUR)	261 kg	Stefan Vladisavljev (SRB)	246 kg	František Polák (CZE)	239 kg
67 kg
Snatch	Isa Rustamov (AZE)	131 kg	Marek Komorowski (POL)	124 kg	Dian Pampordzhiev (BUL)	121 kg
Clean & Jerk	Isa Rustamov (AZE)	147 kg	Dian Pampordzhiev (BUL)	151 kg	Victor Anici (ROU)	148 kg
Total	Isa Rustamov (AZE)	278 kg	Dian Pampordzhiev (BUL)	272 kg	Marek Komorowski (POL)	271 kg
73 kg
Snatch	Roberto Gutu (GER)	147 kg	Kakhi Asanidze (GEO)	146 kg	Piotr Kudłaszyk (POL)	140 kg
Clean & Jerk	Kakhi Asanidze (GEO)	176 kg	Roberto Gutu (GER)	174 kg	Piotr Kudłaszyk (POL)	173 kg
Total	Kakhi Asanidze (GEO)	322 kg	Roberto Gutu (GER)	321 kg	Piotr Kudłaszyk (POL)	313 kg
81 kg
Snatch	Marin Robu (MDA)	155 kg	Chris Murray (GBR)	141 kg	Dmytro Kondratiuk (UKR)	139 kg
Clean & Jerk	Marin Robu (MDA)	197 kg	Chris Murray (GBR)	178 kg	Dmytro Kondratiuk (UKR)	177 kg
Total	Marin Robu (MDA)	352 kg	Chris Murray (GBR)	319 kg	Dmytro Kondratiuk (UKR)	316 kg
89 kg
Snatch	Cristiano Giuseppe Ficco (ITA)	165 kg	Raphael Friedrich (GER)	160 kg	Armands Mežinskis (LAT)	155 kg
Clean & Jerk	Cristiano Giuseppe Ficco (ITA)	200 kg	Raphael Friedrich (GER)	197 kg	Vardan Manukyan (ARM)	192 kg
Total	Cristiano Giuseppe Ficco (ITA)	365 kg	Armands Mežinskis (LAT)	352 kg	Raphael Friedrich (GER)	351 kg
96 kg
Snatch	Ara Aghanyan (ARM)	168 kg	Irakli Gobejishvili (GEO)	160 kg	Patryk Sawulski (POL)	153 kg
Clean & Jerk	Ara Aghanyan (ARM)	195 kg	Irakli Gobejishvili (GEO)	194 kg	Erik Ludwig (GER)	193 kg
Total	Ara Aghanyan (ARM)	363 kg	Irakli Gobejishvili (GEO)	354 kg	Erik Ludwig (GER)	344 kg
102 kg
Snatch	Irakli Chkheidze (GEO)	165 kg	Yevhenii Yantsevych (UKR)	163 kg	Ján Marek Trebichavský (SVK)	143 kg
Clean & Jerk	Irakli Chkheidze (GEO)	216 kg	Yevhenii Yantsevych (UKR)	185 kg	Hugo Hultvall (SWE)	176 kg
Total	Irakli Chkheidze (GEO)	381 kg	Yevhenii Yantsevych (UKR)	348 kg	Arnošt Vogel (CZE)	317 kg
109 kg
Snatch	Marcin Izdebski (POL)	168 kg	Zaza Lomtadze (GEO)	164 kg	Yasha Minasyan (ARM)	163 kg
Clean & Jerk	Zaza Lomtadze (GEO)	205 kg	Akaki Talahadze (GEO)	199 kg	Yasha Minasyan (ARM)	198 kg
Total	Zaza Lomtadze (GEO)	369 kg	Yasha Minasyan (ARM)	361 kg	Marcin Izdebski (POL)	360 kg
+109 kg
Snatch	Varazdat Lalayan (ARM)	200 kg	Oleh Hanzenko (UKR)	175 kg	Olaf Pasikowski (POL)	165 kg
Clean & Jerk	Varazdat Lalayan (ARM)	240 kg	Oleh Hanzenko (UKR)	215 kg	Szilárd Holló (HUN)	201 kg
Total	Varazdat Lalayan (ARM)	440 kg	Oleh Hanzenko (UKR)	390 kg	Szilárd Holló (HUN)	356 kg

=== Women ===
Event	Gold		Silver		Bronze	
45 kg
Snatch	Melisa Güneş (TUR)	67 kg	Cosmina Pană (ROU)	63 kg	Bianca Dumitrescu (ROU)	62 kg
Clean & Jerk	Melisa Güneş (TUR)	82 kg	Cosmina Pană (ROU)	81 kg	Bianca Dumitrescu (ROU)	79 kg
Total	Melisa Güneş (TUR)	149 kg	Cosmina Pană (ROU)	144 kg	Bianca Dumitrescu (ROU)	141 kg
49 kg
Snatch	Giulia Imperio (ITA)	80 kg	Duygu Alıcı (TUR)	75 kg	Radmila Zagorac (SRB)	72 kg
Clean & Jerk	Giulia Imperio (ITA)	96 kg	Duygu Alıcı (TUR)	95 kg	Radmila Zagorac (SRB)	85 kg
Total	Giulia Imperio (ITA)	176 kg	Duygu Alıcı (TUR)	170 kg	Radmila Zagorac (SRB)	157 kg
55 kg
Snatch	Catrin Jones (GBR)	79 kg	Hatice Açıkgöz (TUR)	78 kg	Marinela Moroşan (ROU)	77 kg
Clean & Jerk	Catrin Jones (GBR)	104 kg	Hatice Açıkgöz (TUR)	94 kg	Olga Shapiro (ISR)	91 kg
Total	Catrin Jones (GBR)	183 kg	Hatice Açıkgöz (TUR)	172 kg	Marinela Moroşan (ROU)	167 kg
59 kg
Snatch	Kamila Konotop (UKR)	104 kg	Lucrezia Magistris (ITA)	99 kg	Sofia Georgopoulou (GRE)	91 kg
Clean & Jerk	Kamila Konotop (UKR)	116 kg	Lucrezia Magistris (ITA)	112 kg	Sofia Georgopoulou (GRE)	111 kg
Total	Kamila Konotop (UKR)	220 kg	Lucrezia Magistris (ITA)	211 kg	Sofia Georgopoulou (GRE)	202 kg
64 kg
Snatch	Mariia Hanhur (UKR)	98 kg	Laurène Fauvel (FRA)	86 kg	Wiktoria Wołk (POL)	86 kg
Clean & Jerk	Mariia Hanhur (UKR)	116 kg	Nuray Güngör (TUR)	110 kg	Wiktoria Wołk (POL)	108 kg
Total	Mariia Hanhur (UKR)	214 kg	Wiktoria Wołk (POL)	194 kg	Laurène Fauvel (FRA)	192 kg
71 kg
Snatch	Eygló Fanndal Sturludóttir (ISL)	97 kg	Lara Dancz (GER)	95 kg	Sonja Bjelić (SRB)	94 kg
Clean & Jerk	Eygló Fanndal Sturludóttir (ISL)	120 kg	Vicky Graillot (FRA)	114 kg	Alice Aitchison (GBR)	110 kg
Total	Eygló Fanndal Sturludóttir (ISL)	217 kg	Lara Dancz (GER)	205 kg	Vicky Graillot (FRA)	203 kg
76 kg
Snatch	Nikki Löwik (NED)	97 kg	Jutta Selin (FIN)	91 kg	Caroline Gernsøe (DEN)	81 kg
Clean & Jerk	Nikki Löwik (NED)	114 kg	Jutta Selin (FIN)	110 kg	Despoina Charitopoulou (GRE)	106 kg
Total	Nikki Löwik (NED)	211 kg	Jutta Selin (FIN)	201 kg	Despoina Charitopoulou (GRE)	185 kg
81 kg
Snatch	Veronika Mitykó (HUN)	98 kg	Nikola Seničová (SVK)	91 kg	Simona Jeřábková (CZE)	85 kg
Clean & Jerk	Nikola Seničová (SVK)	111 kg	Veronika Mitykó (HUN)	110 kg	Arjeta Rade (ALB)	102 kg
Total	Veronika Mitykó (HUN)	208 kg	Nikola Seničová (SVK)	202 kg	Simona Jeřábková (CZE)	186 kg
87 kg
Snatch	Agnieszka Zimroz (POL)	92 kg	Alexandra Alexe (ROU)	90 kg	Luiza Sahradyan (ARM)	85 kg
Clean & Jerk	Alexandra Alexe (ROU)	117 kg	Agnieszka Zimroz (POL)	109 kg	Luiza Sahradyan (ARM)	90 kg
Total	Alexandra Alexe (ROU)	207 kg	Agnieszka Zimroz (POL)	201 kg	Luiza Sahradyan (ARM)	175 kg
+87 kg
Snatch	Sarah Fischer (AUT)	102 kg	Krystyna Borodina (UKR)	101 kg	Natalia Chołuj (POL)	88 kg
Clean & Jerk	Sarah Fischer (AUT)	135 kg	Krystyna Borodina (UKR)	130 kg	Natalia Chołuj (POL)	110 kg
Total	Sarah Fischer (AUT)	237 kg	Krystyna Borodina (UKR)	231 kg	Natalia Chołuj (POL)	198 kg

== Participating nations ==
342 athletes from 39 nations.

- Albania (12)
- Armenia (23)
- Austria (6)
- Azerbaijan (9)
- Belgium (3)
- Bosnia and Herzegovina (2)
- Bulgaria (8)
- Croatia (3)
- Czech Republic (12)
- Denmark (4)
- Estonia (1)
- Finland (23)
- France (6)
- Georgia (22)
- Germany (11)
- Great Britain (11)
- Greece (9)
- Hungary (8)
- Iceland (3)
- Ireland (5)
- Israel (4)
- Italy (11)
- Kosovo (1)
- Latvia (4)
- Lithuania (4)
- Malta (1)
- Moldova (7)
- Netherlands (4)
- Norway (5)
- Poland (28)
- Romania (22)
- Serbia (4)
- Slovakia (7)
- Slovenia (1)
- Spain (12)
- Sweden (5)
- Switzerland (1)
- Turkey (18)
- Ukraine (22)
