= Giulia Imperio =

Italian weightlifter (born 2001)

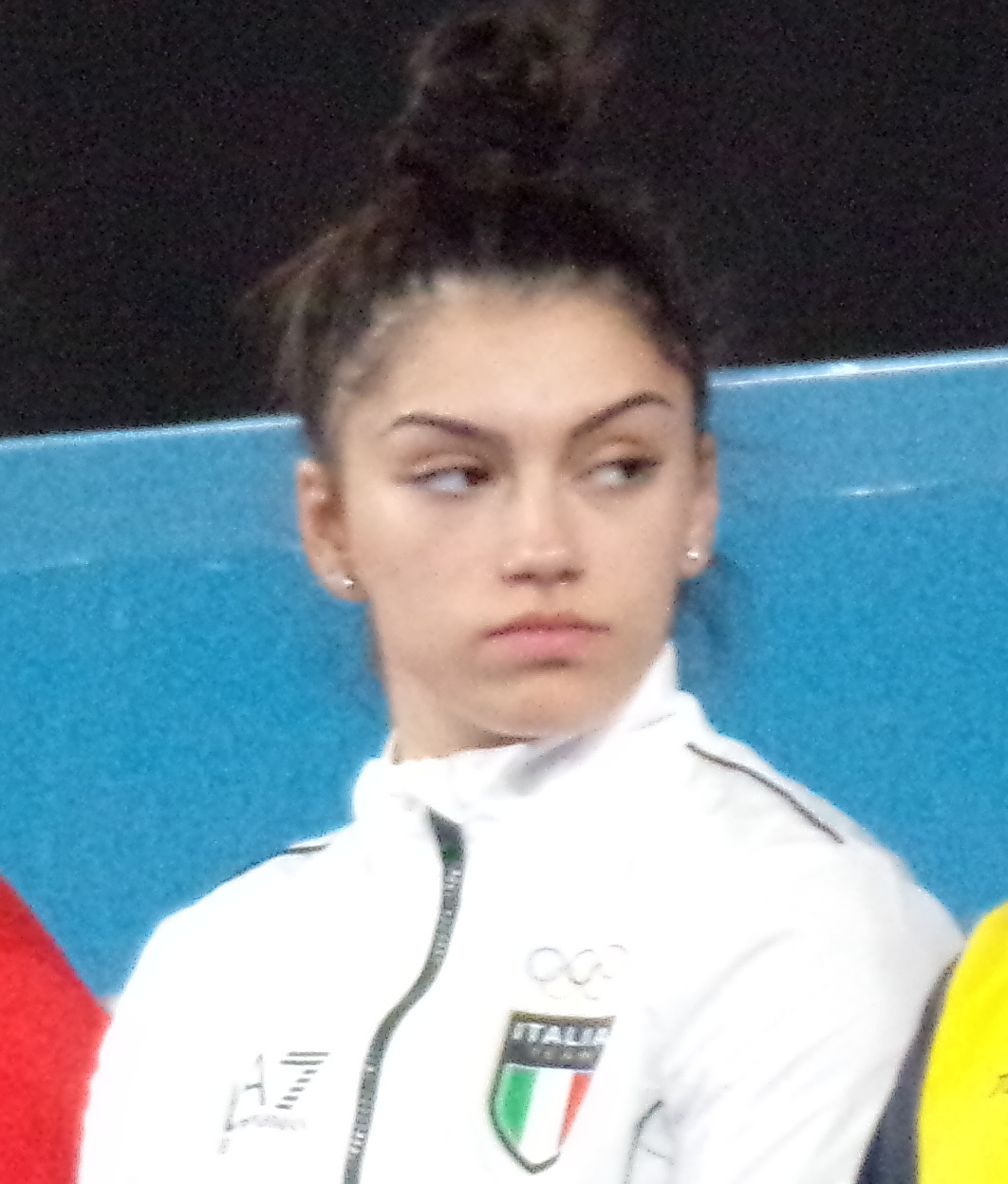
- Imperio at the 2018 Summer Youth Olympics

Personal information
- Born: 7 December 2001 (age 24) Grottaglie, Taranto, Italy

Sport
- Country: Italy
- Sport: Weightlifting
- Weight class: 49 kg
Medal record
Women's weightlifting
Representing Italy
European Championships
Gold medal – first place	2022 Tirana	49 kg
Gold medal – first place	2026 Batumi	48 kg
Silver medal – second place	2023 Yerevan	49 kg
Mediterranean Games
Gold medal – first place	2022 Oran	49 kg S
Gold medal – first place	2022 Oran	49 kg CJ

Giulia Imperio (born 7 December 2001) is an Italian weightlifter. She won the gold medal in the women's 49 kg event at the 2022 European Weightlifting Championships held in Tirana, Albania. She also won two gold medals at the 2022 Mediterranean Games held in Oran, Algeria.

== Career ==
In 2018, Imperio won the silver medal in the under-17 girls 48 kg event at the European Youth Weightlifting Championships held in San Donato Milanese, Italy. She competed in the 48 kg event at the Summer Youth Olympics held in Buenos Aires, Argentina. She also competed at the 2018 European Junior & U23 Weightlifting Championships held in Zamość, Poland and in the women's 49 kg event at the 2018 World Weightlifting Championships held in Ashgabat, Turkmenistan.

Imperio competed at the 2019 Junior World Weightlifting Championships held in Suva, Fiji where she won the bronze medal in the women's 49 kg Snatch event. She also won the bronze medal in the junior women's 49 kg Snatch event at the 2019 European Junior & U23 Weightlifting Championships held in Bucharest, Romania.

In 2021, Imperio competed at the European Weightlifting Championships held in Moscow, Russia. She won the bronze medal in the women's 49 kg Snatch event. She also competed at the 2021 Junior World Weightlifting Championships held in Tashkent, Uzbekistan. She won the gold medal in her event at the 2021 European Junior & U23 Weightlifting Championships held in Rovaniemi, Finland.

Imperio won the gold medal in the women's 49 kg Snatch and Clean & Jerk events at the 2022 Mediterranean Games held in Oran, Algeria. She won the gold medal in her event at the 2022 European Junior & U23 Weightlifting Championships held in Durrës, Albania. She finished in 12th place in the women's 49 kg event at the 2022 World Weightlifting Championships held in Bogotá, Colombia.

Imperio won the silver medal in the women's 49 kg event at the 2023 European Weightlifting Championships held in Yerevan, Armenia. She also won the silver medals in the Snatch and Clean & Jerk events.

== Achievements ==
Year	Venue	Weight	Snatch (kg)				Clean & Jerk (kg)				Total	Rank
Year	Venue	Weight	1	2	3	Rank	1	2	3	Rank	Total	Rank
World Championships
2018	Ashgabat, Turkmenistan	49 kg	~~65~~	65	~~68~~	27	78	82	86	25	151	26
2022	Bogotá, Colombia	49 kg	~~80~~	~~80~~	80	16	97	101	~~105~~	12	181	12
2023	Riyadh, Saudi Arabia	49 kg	80	~~85~~	85	8	98	~~101~~	~~103~~	17	183	11
European Championships
2021	Moscow, Russia	49 kg	76	81	~~84~~	3rd place, bronze medalist(s)	94	97	~~100~~	4	178	4
2022	Tirana, Albania	49 kg	~~79~~	79	~~81~~	2nd place, silver medalist(s)	92	~~100~~	~~104~~	1st place, gold medalist(s)	171	1st place, gold medalist(s)
2023	Yerevan, Armenia	49 kg	~~82~~	~~82~~	83	2nd place, silver medalist(s)	98	100	~~102~~	2nd place, silver medalist(s)	183	2nd place, silver medalist(s)
2024	Sofia, Bulgaria	49 kg	~~83~~	~~83~~	~~83~~	—N/a	—	—	—	—	—N/a	—N/a
2026	(Georgia (country)) Batumi, Georgia	48 kg	~~77~~	~~77~~	78	1st place, gold medalist(s)	93	96	98	1st place, gold medalist(s)	176	1st place, gold medalist(s)
Mediterranean Games
2022	Oran, Algeria	49 kg	77	79	83	1st place, gold medalist(s)	95	97	~~102~~	1st place, gold medalist(s)	—N/a	—N/a
