= Liana Gyurjyan =

Armenian weightlifter (born 2002)

Personal information
- Born: 13 June 2002 (age 24)

Sport
- Country: Armenia
- Sport: Weightlifting
- Weight class: 81 kg
Medal record
Women's weightlifting
Representing Armenia
European Championships
Silver medal – second place	2025 Chișinău	87 kg
Bronze medal – third place	2019 Batumi	81 kg
Bronze medal – third place	2021 Moscow	81 kg
European U23 Championships
Gold medal – first place	2025 Durres	86 kg
Junior World Championships
Gold medal – first place	2021 Tashkent	81 kg

Liana Gyurjyan (born 13 June 2002) is an Armenian weightlifter. She is a two-time bronze medalist at the European Weightlifting Championships. She also won the gold medal in the women's 81 kg event at the 2021 Junior World Weightlifting Championships held in Tashkent, Uzbekistan.

== Career ==
Gyurjyan won the gold medal in the under-15 girls 69 kg event at the 2017 European Youth Weightlifting Championships held in Pristina, Kosovo. She also won the gold medal in the under-17 girls 69 kg event at the 2018 European Youth Weightlifting Championships held in San Donato Milanese, Italy. She competed in the girls' +63 kg event at the 2018 Summer Youth Olympics held in Buenos Aires, Argentina. In that same year, she competed in the women's 71 kg event at the World Weightlifting Championships held in Ashgabat, Turkmenistan.

At the 2019 European Weightlifting Championships held in Batumi, Georgia, Gyurjyan finished in 4th place in the women's 81 kg event but this became the bronze medal after disqualification of the original gold medalist Eleni Konstantinidi of Greece. In that same year, she won the gold medal in the junior women's 81 kg event at the 2019 European Junior & U23 Weightlifting Championships in Bucharest, Romania.

In 2021, she won the bronze medal in the women's 81 kg event at the European Weightlifting Championships held in Moscow, Russia. At the 2021 European Junior & U23 Weightlifting Championships in Rovaniemi, Finland, she won the gold medal in her event.

Gyurjyan won the gold medal in her event at the 2022 European Junior & U23 Weightlifting Championships held in Durrës, Albania.

== Achievements ==
Year	Venue	Weight	Snatch (kg)				Clean & Jerk (kg)				Total	Rank
Year	Venue	Weight	1	2	3	Rank	1	2	3	Rank	Total	Rank
World Championships
2018	Ashgabat, Turkmenistan	71 kg	~~85~~	85	~~90~~	22	105	~~110~~	110	19	195	19
2022	Bogotá, Colombia	81 kg	95	100	103	13	125	130	134	11	237	11
2023	Riyadh, Saudi Arabia	81 kg	93	~~96~~	96	22	127	~~130~~	~~130~~	12	223	13
European Championships
2019	Batumi, Georgia	81 kg	90	94	97	4	115	120	~~125~~	2nd place, silver medalist(s)	217	3rd place, bronze medalist(s)
2021	Moscow, Russia	81 kg	94	98	~~100~~	6	121	125	129	2nd place, silver medalist(s)	227	3rd place, bronze medalist(s)
2023	Yerevan, Armenia	81 kg	~~95~~	95	~~99~~	9	120	~~126~~	~~126~~	10	215	10
2024	Sofia, Bulgaria	81 kg	95	~~98~~	~~98~~	6	~~125~~	125	~~129~~	4	220	4
2025	Chișinău, Moldova	87 kg	100	104	106	4	130	135	140	2nd place, silver medalist(s)	246	2nd place, silver medalist(s)
