= Dilara Uçan =

Turkish weightlifter (born 2002)

Personal information
- Nationality: Turkish
- Born: 15 April 2002 (age 24)
- Height: 170 cm (5 ft 7 in)
- Weight: 76 kg (168 lb)

Sport
- Country: Turkey
- Weight class: 76 kg
Medal record
Women's weightlifting
Representing Turkey
European Championships
Bronze medal – third place	2022 Tirana	76 kg
Islamic Solidarity Games
Gold medal – first place	2021 Konya	76 kg T
Gold medal – first place	2021 Konya	76 kg S
Bronze medal – third place	2021 Konya	76 kg CJ
European U23 Championships
Silver medal – second place	2025 Durres	69 kg
World Junior Championships
Silver medal – second place	2021 Tashkent	81 kg
European Junior Championships
Silver medal – second place	2021 Rovaniemi	81 kg
Silver medal – second place	2022 Durrës	76 kg
European Youth Championships
Silver medal – second place	2018 San Donato Milanese	75 kg
Silver medal – second place	2019 Eilat	76 kg

Dilara Uçan (born 15 April 2002) is a Turkish weightlifter who competes in the 76 kg division.

== Sport career ==
She won the bronze medal in the women's 76 kg event at the 2022 European Weightlifting Championships in Tirana, Albania.
