= Sara Yenigün =

Turkish weightlifter (born 2002)

Sara YenigünLtun
Personal information
- Born: 1 October 2002 (age 23) Seyhan, Adana, Turkey
- Weight: 81 kg (179 lb)

Sport
- Country: Turkey
- Weight class: 81 kg
- Club: Adana G.S.K.
Medal record
Women's weightlifting
Representing Turkey
European Championships
Bronze medal – third place	2023 Yerevan	81 kg C&J
Junior World Championships
Bronze medal – third place	2022 Heraklion	87 kg C&J
European Junior & U23 Championships
Gold medal – first place	2022 Durrës	87 kg J
Silver medal – second place	2021 Rovaniemi	81 kg J
European Youth Championships
Bronze medal – third place	2019 Eilat	71 kg

Sara Yenigün (born 1 October 2002) is a Turkish weightlifter competing in the 81 kg division.

== Personal life ==
Born on 1 October 2002, Sara Yenigün is a native of Seyhan, Adana. She attended Şehit Zafer Oluk Middle School in her hometown. After completing her secondary education, she started studying Sport coaching at the Physical Education College of the Niğde Ömer Halisdemir University.

== Sport career ==
Yenigün was impressed while watching students exercising this sport in her school. Although told by the boys that this sport is not for girls, she started weightlifting with the advice of her gym teacher in 2015. The same year, she became champion in the 58 kg division of her age category at the Turkish Intraschool Championships. In 2021, she became the Turkish Juniors champion in the 81 kg, and in 2022 Turkish senior women champion in the 87 kg division.

She is a member of Adana Gençlik Spor Club, and exercise in the Olympics Preparation Center (TOHM) in Konya.

Yenigün debuted internationally in Europe championships in 2017, and competed in 2018 as well. She received the silver medal in the 71 kg clean & jerk event and the bronze medal in total at the 2019 European Youth Weightlifting Championships held in Eilat, Israel. She competed in the 88 kg division at the 2021 Junior World Weightlifting Championships in Tashkent, Uzbekistan ranking fifth. The same year in Rovaniemi, Finnland, she won the bronze medal in the snatch, the gold medal in the clean & jerk event taking the silver medal in total of the Juniors 81 kg division. Despite the serious injuries she suffered in 2022, she captured all three gold medals that year in the Juniors 87 kg division at the European Junior & U23 Weightlifting Championships in Durrës, Albania. She took the bronze medal in the 87 kg clean & jerk event at the 2022 Junior World Weightlifting Championships in Heraklion, Greece. She took the bronze medal in the 81 kg clean & jerk event at the 2023 European Weightlifting Championships in Yerevan, Armenia.

== Achievements ==
Year	Competition	Venue	Weight	Snatch		Clean & Jerk		Total	
Year	Competition	Venue	Weight	(kg)	Rank	(kg)	Rank	(kg)	Rank
2019	European Youth Championships	Eilat, Israel	71 kg	87	4th	113	2nd place, silver medalist(s)	200	3rd place, bronze medalist(s)
2021	European Junior & U23 Championships	Rovaniemi, Finland	81 kg	91	3rd place, bronze medalist(s)	122	1st place, gold medalist(s)	212	2nd place, silver medalist(s)
2022	European Junior & U23 Championships	Durrës, Albania	87 kg	95	1st place, gold medalist(s)	123	1st place, gold medalist(s)	218	1st place, gold medalist(s)
2022	Junior World Championships	(Greece) Heraklion, Greecw	87 kg	90	9th	127	3rd place, bronze medalist(s)	217	6th
2023	European Championships	Yerevan, Armenia	81 kg	100	4th	131	3rd place, bronze medalist(s)	231	4th
