= Aysel Özkan =

Turkish weightlifter (born 2002)

Personal information
- Born: 26 February 2002 (age 24) Niğde, Turkey
- Education: Niğde Ömer Halisdemir University
- Weight: 63 kg (139 lb)

Sport
- Country: Turkey
- Weight class: 64 kg
- Team: Ankara B.Ş.B.
- Coached by: Hasan Toker
Medal record
Women's weightlifting
Representing Turkey
European Championships
Silver medal – second place	2025 Chișinău	64 kg
Islamic Solidarity Games
Gold medal – first place	2021 Konya	71 kg S
Gold medal – first place	2025 Riyadh	63 kg S
Gold medal – first place	2025 Riyadh	63 kg C&J
Gold medal – first place	2025 Riyadh	63 kg T
Silver medal – second place	2021 Konya	71 kg S
Silver medal – second place	2021 Konya	71 kg T
Mediterranean Games
Silver medal – second place	2026 Taranto	61 kg S
European U23 Championships
Silver medal – second place	2023 Bucharest	64 kg
Silver medal – second place	2025 Durres	63 kg
European Junior Championships
Silver medal – second place	2021 Rovaniemi	64 kg
Bronze medal – third place	2022 Durrës	71 kg
European Youth Championships
Silver medal – second place	2019 Eilat	59 kg

Aysel Özkan (born 26 February 2002) is a Turkish weightlifter competing in the 63 kg.

== Personal life ==
Aysel Özkan was born on 26 February 2002. She is twin sister of Cansel. Both girls grew up in the Children's Home Coordination Center (Turkish: Çocuk Evi Koordinasyon Merkezi, ÇEKOM) in Niğde. After their father's death in 2009, they followed their mother to her hometown Gaziantep. Due to family problems, the two sisters returned to Niğde one year later, and were placed in the ÇEKOM again.

She is a student of Sports coaching in the Sports Science Faculty at Niğde Ömer Halisdemir University.

== Sport career ==
Özkan started weightlifting in 2014 with the advice of a trainer in this sport branch.

She took part in the U17 59 kg division of the 2019 European Youth Weightlifting Championships held in Eilat, Israel, and won the gold medal in the snatch, the bronze medal in the clean & jerk event taking the silver medal in total. At the 2021 Junior World Weightlifting Championships in Tashkent, Uzbekistan, she placed fourth in the 71 kg Özkan took the silver medal in the snatch, the bronze medal in the clean & jerk event, reaching to the silver medal in total of the Juniors 64 kg division at the 2021 European Junior & U23 Weightlifting Championships in Rovaniemi, Finland. At the 2021 World Weightlifting Championships in Tashkent, Uzbekistan, she placed sixth in the 64 kg division. She won the bronze medal in the 71 kg snatch event and ranked four in total at the 2022 European Weightlifting Championships in Tirana, Albania. She took the bronze medal in the 71 kg snatch event and placed fourth at the 2022 Junior World Weightlifting Championships in Heraklion, Greece. She received the silver medal in the snatch, the gold medal in the clean & jerk event and the silver medal in total of the 71 kg division at the 2021 Islamic Solidarity Games in Konya, Turkey. She broke the Games record of the clean & jerk event with 121 kg. In 2022 at the European Junior & U23 Weightlifting Championships in Durrës, Albania, she became bronze medalist in total taking the bronze medal in the snatch and the silver in the clean & jerk event of the 71 kg division. At the 2023 European Weightlifting Championships in Yerevan, Armenia, she won the silver medal in the 64 kg snatch event and ranked four in total. She reached to the bronze medal at the 2024 European Championships in Sofia, Bulgaria.

She exercises at cs Prthe Olympic Preparation Center (TOHM) in Konya.

Aysel Özkan won the gold medal in the women's 64 kg weightlifting category at the 2025 European Weightlifting Championships in Chișinău, Moldova, with 100 kg in the snatch, fourth with 122 kg in the clean & jerk and silver with 222 kg in total.

== Achievements ==
Year	Competition	Venue	Weight	Snatch		Clean & Jerk		Total	
Year	Competition	Venue	Weight	(kg)	Rank	(kg)	Rank	(kg)	Rank
2019	European Youth Championships	Eilat, Israel	59 kg	85	1st place, gold medalist(s)	98	3rd place, bronze medalist(s)	183	2nd place, silver medalist(s)
2021	Junior World Championships	Tashkent, Uzbekistan	71 kg	101	4th	116	5th	217	4th
2021	European Junior & U23 Championships	Rovaniemi, Finland	64 kg	99	2nd place, silver medalist(s)	105	3rd place, bronze medalist(s)	204	2nd place, silver medalist(s)
2021	World Championships	Tashkent, Uzbekistan	64 kg	97	4th	116	6th	213	6th
2022	European Championships	Tirana, Albania	71 kg	98	3rd place, bronze medalist(s)	115	7th	213	4th
2022	Junior World Championships	Heraklion, Greece	71 kg	101	3rd place, bronze medalist(s)	120	5th	221	4th
2022	Islamic Solidarity Games	Konya, Turkey	71 kg	95	2nd place, silver medalist(s)	121; GR	1st place, gold medalist(s)	216	2nd place, silver medalist(s)
2022	European Junior & U23 Championships	Durrës, Albania	71 kg	94	3rd place, bronze medalist(s)	11	2nd place, silver medalist(s)	209	3rd place, bronze medalist(s)
2023	European Championships	Yerevan, Armenia	64 kg	98	2nd place, silver medalist(s)	115	7th	213	4th
2024	European Championships	Sofia, Bulgaria	64 kg	98	3rd place, bronze medalist(s)	116	4th	214	4th
2025	European Championships	Chișinău, Moldova	64 kg	100	1st place, gold medalist(s)	122	4th	222	2nd place, silver medalist(s)
2025	World Championships	Førde, Norway	63 kg	102	4th	120	10th	222	8th
