= Windy Cantika Aisah =

Indonesian weightlifter (born 2002)

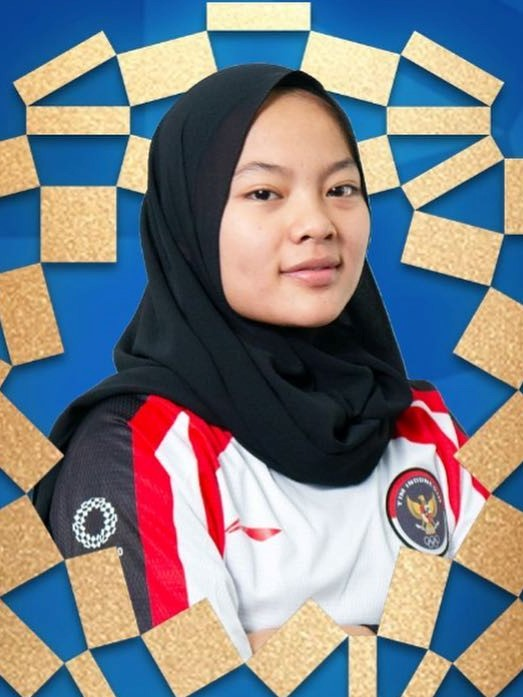
- Aisah's Tokyo 2020 portrait, captured by Indonesian Ministry of Youth and Sport, 2021

Personal information
- Born: 11 June 2002 (age 24) Bandung, West Java, Indonesia
- Education: Management science STIE Tridharma Bandung

Sport
- Country: Indonesia
- Sport: Weightlifting
- Weight class: 49 kg
- Coached by: Dirdja Wihardja; Jajang Supriatna
Medal record
Women's weightlifting
Representing Indonesia
Olympic Games
Bronze medal – third place	2020 Tokyo	49 kg
SEA Games
Gold medal – first place	2019 Philippines	49 kg
Junior World Championships
Gold medal – first place	2021 Tashkent	49 kg
Gold medal – first place	2022 Heraklion	49 kg
Silver medal – second place	2019 Suva	49 kg
Asian Junior Championships
Gold medal – first place	2020 Tashkent	49 kg
Silver medal – second place	2019 Pyongyang	49 kg

Windy Cantika Aisah (born 11 June 2002) is an Indonesian weightlifter. She won the gold medal at the 2019 SEA Games and the bronze medal at the 2020 Summer Olympics in the women's 49 kg event.

== Career ==
Aisah made her debut at the SEA Games in 2019 Philippines, by competing in the women's 49 kg. She won the gold medal after lifting 190 kg in total.

In 2021, Aisah won a bronze for the snatch at the 2020 Asian Championships, and later she won the gold medal in her event at the 2021 Junior World Championships held in Tashkent, Uzbekistan. Aisah qualified to represent Indonesia at the 2020 Summer Olympics in Tokyo, Japan. She claimed the first medal for Indonesia at the 2020 Summer Olympics after winning the bronze medal in the women's 49 kg event with 194 kg lift in total.

She competed in the women's 49 kg event at the 2022 World Weightlifting Championships held in Bogotá, Colombia.

== Competition results ==
Year	Event Name	Venue	Weight	Snatch (kg)				Clean & Jerk (kg)				Total	Rank
Year	Event Name	Venue	Weight	1	2	3	Rank	1	2	3	Rank	Total	Rank
2021	Asian Championships	Tashkent, Uzbekistan	49 kg	82	~~86~~	87	3rd place, bronze medalist(s)	102	~~106~~	~~106~~	4	189	4
2021	World Junior Championships	Tashkent, Uzbekistan	49 kg	82	86	~~88~~	1st place, gold medalist(s)	100	105	~~107~~	1st place, gold medalist(s)	191	1st place, gold medalist(s)
2021	Summer Olympics	Tokyo, Japan	49kg	~~84~~	84	~~87~~	4	103	108	110	3	194	3rd place, bronze medalist(s)
2022	World Junior Championships	Heraklion, Greece	49 kg	77	81	83	1st place, gold medalist(s)	97	102	---	1st place, gold medalist(s)	185	1st place, gold medalist(s)
2022	SEA Games	Hanoi, Vietnam	49 kg	82	86	~~88~~	2	~~100~~	~~100~~	~~100~~	---	86	---
2022	Asian Championships	Manama, Bahrain	55 kg	80	83	86	4	98	103	106	3rd place, bronze medalist(s)	192	4
2022	World Championships	Bogotá, Colombia	49 kg	~~80~~	80	~~84~~	15	~~96~~	96	---	16	176	15

== Awards and nominations ==
Award	Year	Category	Result	Ref.
Line Today Choice	2021	Most Favorite Indonesian Athlete	Nominated	
