= Karen Margaryan =

Armenian weightlifter (born 2001)

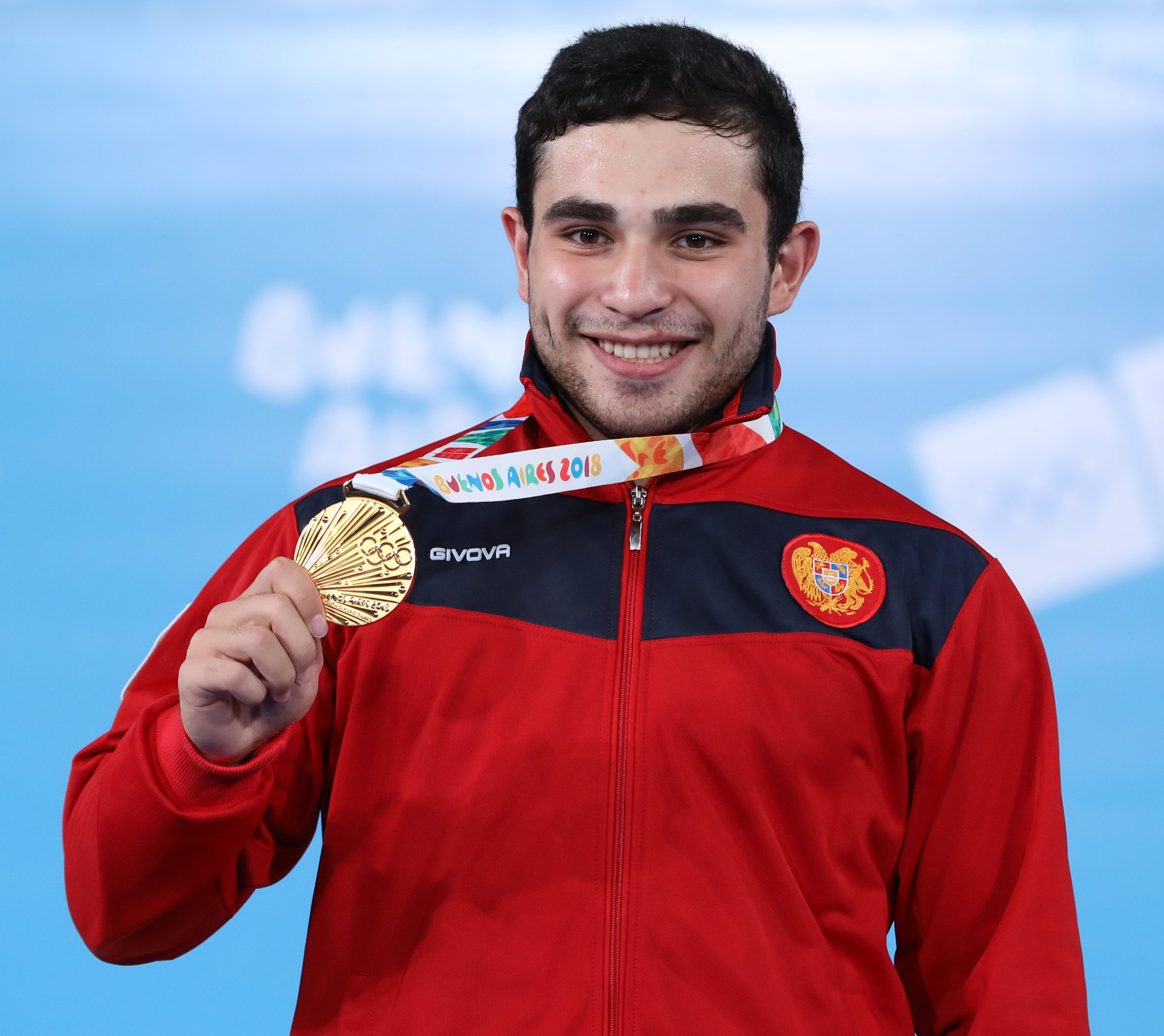
- Karen Margaryan in 2018

Personal information
- Born: 26 April 2001 (age 25)

Sport
- Country: Armenia
- Sport: Weightlifting
Medal record
Men's weightlifting
Representing Armenia
Junior World Championships
Silver medal – second place	2021 Tashkent	81 kg
Summer Youth Olympics
Gold medal – first place	2018 Buenos Aires	77 kg
European Youth Weightlifting Championships
Gold medal – first place	2018 San Donato Milanese	77 kg
Bronze medal – third place	2017 Pristina	77 kg

Karen Margaryan (born 26 April 2001) is an Armenian weightlifter. He won the gold medal in the 77 kg event at the 2018 Summer Youth Olympics held in Buenos Aires, Argentina.

In 2019, at the European Junior & U23 Weightlifting Championships held in Bucharest, Romania, he won the bronze medal in the men's junior 81 kg Snatch event.

In 2021, Margaryan won the silver medal in the men's 81 kg event at the Junior World Weightlifting Championships held in Tashkent, Uzbekistan. At the 2021 European Junior & U23 Weightlifting Championships in Rovaniemi, Finland, he won the gold medal in his event.

He competed at the 2022 European Weightlifting Championships held in Tirana, Albania.
