= Catrin Jones =

British weightlifter (born 1999)

Personal information
- Nationality: British
- Born: 13 June 1999 (age 27)

Sport
- Sport: Weightlifting
Medal record
Women's weightlifting
Representing Wales
Commonwealth Championships
Bronze medal – third place	2019 Apia	55 kg
Representing Great Britain
Women's weightlifting
European U23 Championships
Gold medal – first place	2022 Durrës	55 kg
Bronze medal – third place	2021 Rovaniemi	55 kg

Catrin Haf Jones (born 13 June 1999) is a British weightlifter. She won the gold medal in the women's 48 kg division at the 2015 Commonwealth Youth Games and claimed the corresponding national senior title the following year.

She represented Wales at the 2018 Commonwealth Games in Gold Coast, participating in the Women's 53 kg event and finishing in 11th place.

At the 2021 European Junior & U23 Weightlifting Championships in Rovaniemi, Finland, she won the bronze medal in her event. She won the gold medal in her event at the 2022 European Junior & U23 Weightlifting Championships held in Durrës, Albania.
