= Mariia Hanhur =

Ukrainian weightlifter (born 2000)

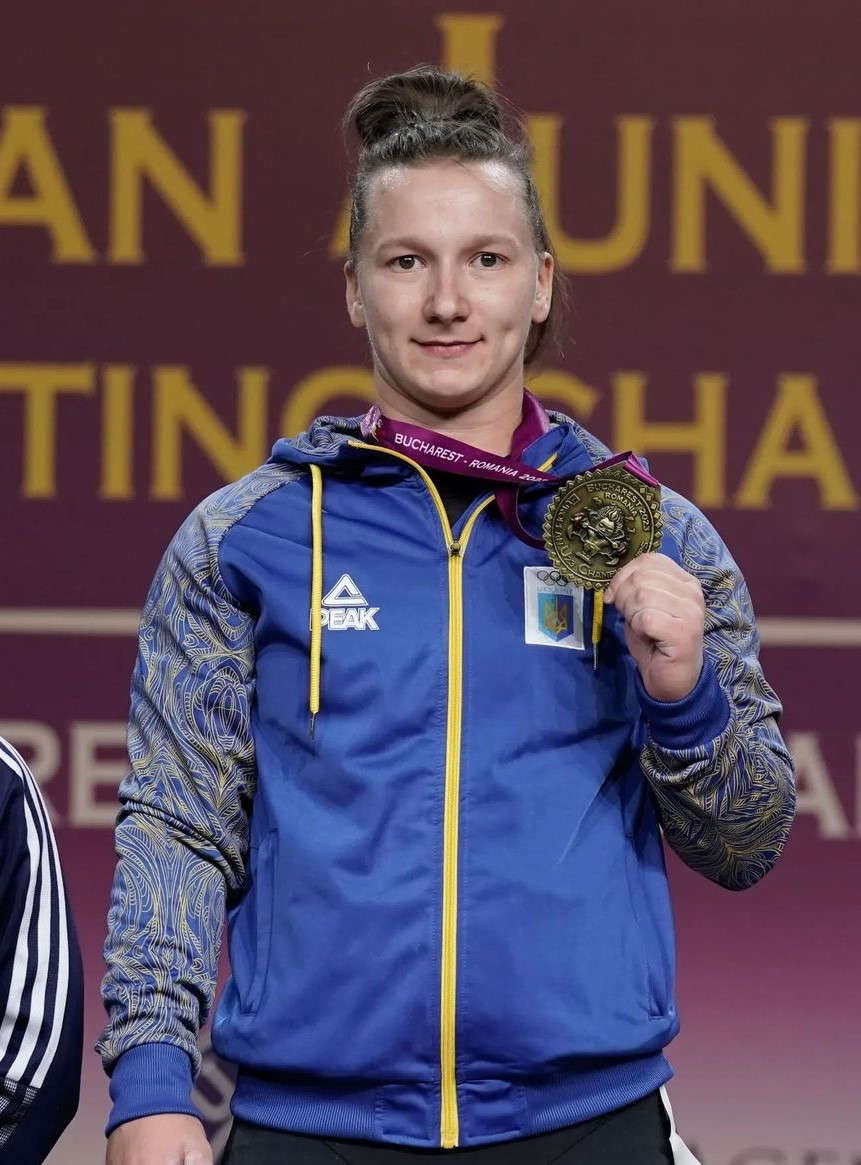

Personal information
- Nationality: Ukrainian
- Born: 24 August 2000 (age 25)
- Weight: 64 kg (141 lb)

Sport
- Country: Ukraine
- Sport: Weightlifting
- Weight class: 64 kg
Medal record
Representing Ukraine
European Championships
Gold medal – first place	2022 Tirana	64 kg
Silver medal – second place	2023 Yerevan	64 kg
Junior World Championships
Gold medal – first place	2021 Rovaniemi	59 kg
Silver medal – second place	2017 Tokyo	53 kg
World Youth Championships
Silver medal – second place	2017 Bangkok	58 kg

Mariia Hanhur (Ukrainian: Марія Гангур; born 24 August 2000) is a Ukrainian weightlifter, and European Champion. She won the gold medal in the 2022 European Weightlifting Championships in the 64 kg event. She won the silver medal in her event at the 2023 European Weightlifting Championships held in Yerevan, Armenia.

She won the gold medal in her event at the 2022 European Junior & U23 Weightlifting Championships held in Durrës, Albania.
