= Cosmina Adriana Pană =

Romanian weightlifter (born 2001)

Personal information
- Born: 18 December 2001 (age 24) Bacău, Romania

Sport
- Country: Romania
- Weight class: 49 kg
- Club: CSM Bacău
- Coached by: George Călin
Medal record
Women's weightlifting
Representing Romania
European Championships
Silver medal – second place	2023 Yerevan	45 kg
European Junior Championships
Silver medal – second place	2019 Bucharest	45 kg
Silver medal – second place	2022 Durrës	45 kg
Bronze medal – third place	2023 Raszyn	49 kg
European Youth Championships
Silver medal – second place	2018 San Donato Milanese	44 kg

Cosmina Adriana Pană (born 18 December 2001) is a Romanian weightlifter competing in the 49 kg category.

== Sport career ==
Cosmina was 13 years old when she knew about the weightlifting section in Bacău. She came to the classroom at school where her future coach (George Călin) was conducting a selection. A few days later she had her first day at the gym. Cosmina really liked the atmosphere, how many kids were there, and she decided to take up weightlifting.

George Călin remembered their first meeting with Cosmina:

“There's a school in the neighborhood, where a large number of athletes are selected. I remember even the day when I went for the selection. Among all the students there, she was the youngest, and she was very curious and asked me a lot of questions. I invited her: “Come to the gym to see what it's really about”. She asked me how much I would lift, how I would do various things. And I told her to come to the gym, and she would see. And right from the start, she stood out with her very high receptivity. She learned very quickly, had great mobility and speed, which is exactly what I was looking for. We made a great team right from the start”.

In 2021, Cosmina was one of the most decorated athletes from CSM Bacău, a silver medalist of the European Weightlifting Championships.

In an interview with the Sport Studio channel, Cosmina and George talked about training during the COVID-19 pandemic, the problem with a training facility in Bacău and their plans for preparing for the 2024 Olympics in Paris.

After successful performances at the European Championships in 2022 and 2023 in the 45 kg weight category, she moved up to the next weight category, 49 kg.

Year	Competition	Venue	Weight	Snatch		Clean & Jerk		Total	
Year	Competition	Venue	Weight	(kg)	Rank	(kg)	Rank	(kg)	Rank
2018	European Youth Weightlifting Championships	San Donato Milanese, Italy	44 kg	61	3rd place, bronze medalist(s)	79	2nd place, silver medalist(s)	140	2nd place, silver medalist(s)
2019	European Junior Weightlifting Championships	Bucharest, Romania	45 kg	66	3rd place, bronze medalist(s)	83	3rd place, bronze medalist(s)	149	2nd place, silver medalist(s)
2021	European Weightlifting Championships	Moscow, Russia	45 kg	66	5	84	2nd place, silver medalist(s)	150	4
2021	Junior World Weightlifting Championships	Tashkent, Uzbekistan	45 kg	~~63~~	—	84	2nd place, silver medalist(s)	—	—
2022	European Junior Weightlifting Championships	Tirana, Albania	45 kg	63	2nd place, silver medalist(s)	81	2nd place, silver medalist(s)	144	2nd place, silver medalist(s)
2022	World Weightlifting Championships	Bogotá, Colombia	45 kg	71	6	86	10	157	8
2023	European Weightlifting Championships	Yerevan, Armenia	45 kg	70	2nd place, silver medalist(s)	83	4	153	2nd place, silver medalist(s)
2023	World Weightlifting Championships	Riyadh, Saudi Arabia	49 kg	73	24	—	—	—	—
2024	European Weightlifting Championships	Sofia, Bulgaria	49 kg	67	10-13	86	9-10	153	10
2024	European Junior Weightlifting Championships	Raszyn, Poland	49 kg	73	1st place, gold medalist(s)	87	3rd place, bronze medalist(s)	160	3rd place, bronze medalist(s)
2024	World Weightlifting Championships	Manama, Bahrain	49 kg	73	8	93	7-8	166	8
2025	European Weightlifting Championships	Chișinău, Moldova	49 kg	76	3rd place, bronze medalist(s)	91	8	167	5
