= Olympics Preparation Centers of Turkey =

Sports training facilities in Turkey

Olympics Preparation Centers of Turkey (Turkish: Türkiye Olimpiyat Hazırlık Merkezleri, TOHM) are facilities governed by the Ministry of Youth and Sports to support sportspeople preparing to shape the future of Turkish sports, especially to train future Olympic athletes. The organization was established in 2015. The main center is in Ankara. There are a total of 22 centers for Olympic sports and one center for Paralympic sports in provinces across the country. A total of 22 different sport disciplines are offered for training under the supervision of experienced coaches. Each center provides training in certain branches being at least two and maximum four. The branches are selected by taking into account the sports potential and halls of that city. The centers provide support for academic, social and personal development. Sportspeople continue with their education as students of daytime or boarding. Secondary education is financed by the center. For higher education, many universities grant scholarship.

== Overview ==
The organization of the Olympics Preparation Centers was established on 11 April 2015. The first center, as the main base, was opened at Eryaman, Etimesgut in Ankara.

The number of centers for Olympic sports increased from 18 in the beginning to 22. The centers are located in the provinces of Ankara, Adana, Antalya, Artvin, Bolu, Bursa, Erzurum, Gaziantep, İzmir, Kahramanmaraş, Kayseri, Kocaeli, Konya, Mersin, Rize, Sakarya, Samsun and Trabzon, usw. The only center for Paralympic sports is in Aksaray Province. The 22 supported sports disciplines include archery, athletics, badminton, boxing canoeing, cycling, curling, fencing, gymnastics, ice skating, judo, karate, kayaking, rowing, shooting, swimming, taekwondo, tennis, weightlifting, winter sports, wrestling and Paralympic sports. A total of 1,166 daytime and boarding sportspeople attended the centers as of May 2021.

== Admission ==
Application for admissiom to the center is for daytime sportspeople aged from 14 up to 21 years, and for boarding athletes from 15 up to 21 years of age. Sportspeople in education can stay in the center until the age of 23 yesrs. The selection of athletes is meticulously carried out in accordance with the criteria determined by the Evaluation Committees. These determined criteria can be updated in order to increase success by evaluating the sports development of the athletes. Athlete selection criteria may vary according to the technical characteristics and performance age of each branch.

== Health ==
Nutrition programs of athletes are determined and implemented in cooperation with the relevant trainers and nutrition specialists. In the centers, expert dietitians prepare daily nutrition programs that will meet the energy and nutrient needs of athletes. The health status of all athletes is also meticulously monitored regularly. Procedures such as keeping health records of athletes, performing follow-ups, recording injuries, disabilities and illnesses are carried out by expert sports physicians. After emergency and first aid is given on site for injuries experienced by athletes, the definition, diagnosis, examination and treatment of injuries and disabilities are carried out under the supervision of TOHM health personnel. Expert psychologists work to increase the performance and success levels of athletes, and to prepare them psychologically for competitions. The psychologists contribute to the sports motivation of athletes, and also work to relieve the mental tension experienced by athlete.

== Some notable sportspeople ==
As of July 2018.

=== Men ===
- Ömer Amaçtan (born 2001), long-distance runner
- Daniyar İsmayilov (born 1992), weightlifter
- Kerem Kamal (born 1999), wrestler

=== Women ===
- Zeliha Ağrıs (born 1998), taekwondo practitioner
- Yasemin Anagöz (born 1998), archer
- Sümeyye Boyacı (born 2003), para swimmer
- Ayşegül Çoban (born 1992), weightlifter
- Nisanur Erbil (born 2005), fencer
- Mehtap Kurnaz (born 1995), weightlifter
- Şevval İlayda Tarhan (born 2000), sport shooter
- Aysel Özkan (born 2002), weightlifter
- Demet Parlak (born 1990), pole vaulter
- Sara Yenigün (born 2002), weightlifter
