= Cansel Özkan =

Turkish weightlifter (born 2002)

Personal information
- Born: 26 February 2002 (age 24) Niğde, Turkey
- Education: Niğde Ömer Halisdemir University
- Weight: 59 kg (130 lb)

Sport
- Country: Turkey
- Weight class: 59 kg
- Team: Ankara B.Ş.B.
- Coached by: Hasan Toker
Medal record
Women's weightlifting
Representing Turkey
European Championships
Bronze medal – third place	2026 Batumi	53 kg
Islamic Solidarity Games
Gold medal – first place	2025 Riyadh	53 kg S
Gold medal – first place	2025 Riyadh	53 kg C&J
Gold medal – first place	2025 Riyadh	53 kg
Bronze medal – third place	2021 Konya	59 kg S
Mediterranean Games
Gold medal – first place	2026 Taranto	53 kg S
Bronze medal – third place	2022 Oran	59 kg S
Bronze medal – third place	2026 Taranto	53 kg CJ
European U23 Championships
Silver medal – second place	2025 Durres	53 kg
Junior World Championships
Silver medal – second place	2021 Tashkent	59 kg
European Junior & U23 Championships
Bronze medal – third place	2021 Rovaniemi	59 kg
European Youth Championships
Bronze medal – third place	2019 Eilat	59 kg

Cansel Özkan (born 26 February 2002) is a Turkish weightlifter competing in the 59 kg.

== Personal life ==
Cansel Özkan was born in 2002. She is twin sister of Aysel. The sisters grew up in the Children's Home Coordination Center (Turkish: Çocuk Evi Koordinasyon Merkezi, ÇEKOM) in Niğde. After their father's death in 2009, the girls moved to Gaziantep following the mother. One year later, they returned to Niğde due to family problems. They were placed in the ÇEKOM again.

== Sport career ==
Özkan started weightlifting together with her sister.

She participated at the 2019 Youth World Weightlifting Championships in Las Vegas, United States, where she won the gold medal in the 55 kg snatch event. The same year, she won the bronze medal in the snatch, the silver medal in the clean & jerk event and the bronze medal in total, competing in the same 59 kg division with her sister, at the European Youth Weightlifting Championships in Eilat, Israel. She took the silver medals in the 59 kg snatch event and in total at the 2021 Junior World Weightlifting Championships in Tashkent, Uzbekistan. At the 2021 European Junior & U23 Weightlifting Championships in Rovaniemi, Finland, she received the silver medal in the 59 kg snatch event and the bronze medal in total. She was not successful at the 2021 World Weightlifting Championships in Tashkent, Uzbekistan as well as at the 2022 Junior World Weightlifting Championships in Heraklion, Greece. In the 59 kg snatch event at the 2022 Mediterranean Games in Oran, Algeria, she took the bronze medal. Özkan won the bronze medal in the snatch event of the 59 kg division at the 2021 Islamic Solidarity Games in Konya, Turkey.
