= Lucrezia Magistris =

Italian weightlifter (born 1999)

Personal information
- Nationality: Italian
- Born: 21 April 1999 (age 27) Pavia, Italy
- Weight: 59 kg (130 lb)

Sport
- Country: Italy
- Sport: Weightlifting
- Event: -59 kg
- Club: Societa Ginnastica Pavese ASD
- Coached by: Sebastiano Corbu
Medal record
Representing Italy
European Championships
Silver medal – second place	2022 Tirana	–59 kg
Mediterranean Games
Gold medal – first place	2022 Oran	59 kg S
Silver medal – second place	2022 Oran	59 kg CJ

Lucrezia Magistris (born 21 April 1999) is an Italian weightlifter, competing in the 59 kg category.

== Career ==
She competed at the 2022 European Weightlifting Championships in Tirana, winning a silver medal in the 59 kg category.

She won the silver medal in her event at the 2022 European Junior & U23 Weightlifting Championships held in Durrës, Albania. In 2023, she competed in the women's 59 kg event at the World Weightlifting Championships held in Riyadh, Saudi Arabia.

In August 2024, Magistris competed in the women's 59 kg event at the 2024 Summer Olympics held in Paris, France. She lifted 208 kg in total and finished in 11th place.

== Achievements ==
Year	Venue	Weight	Snatch (kg)				Clean & Jerk (kg)				Total	Rank
Year	Venue	Weight	1	2	3	Rank	1	2	3	Rank	Total	Rank
Olympic Games
2024	Paris, France	59 kg	~~96~~	96	~~100~~	—N/a	~~111~~	~~112~~	112	—N/a	208	11
World Championships
2018	Ashgabat, Turkmenistan	55 kg	82	~~85~~	~~85~~	20	95	100	103	22	185	22
2019	Pattaya, Thailand	55 kg	~~85~~	85	~~88~~	17	100	~~105~~	~~105~~	26	185	20
2022	Bogotá, Colombia	59 kg	~~98~~	98	~~101~~	7	~~115~~	~~116~~	~~116~~	—	—	—
2023	Riyadh, Saudi Arabia	59 kg	95	~~100~~	~~100~~	16	~~112~~	112	~~117~~	25	207	23
European Championships
2019	Batumi, Georgia	55 kg	90	~~93~~	~~93~~	1st place, gold medalist(s)	~~106~~	~~106~~	~~106~~	—	—	—
2022	Tirana, Albania	59 kg	93	96	98	1st place, gold medalist(s)	110	~~113~~	114	3rd place, bronze medalist(s)	212	2nd place, silver medalist(s)
2023	Yerevan, Armenia	59 kg	~~95~~	~~96~~	~~98~~	—	—	—	—	—	—	—
2024	Sofia, Bulgaria	59 kg	~~99~~	~~99~~	~~100~~	—	—	—	—	—	—	—
Mediterranean Games
2022	Oran, Algeria	59 kg	90	93	95	1st place, gold medalist(s)	111	114	~~118~~	2nd place, silver medalist(s)	—N/a	—N/a
