= Melisa Güneş =

Turkish weightlifter (born 2001)

Personal information
- Born: 16 April 2001 (age 25)
- Weight: 44.66 kg (98.5 lb)

Sport
- Country: Turkey
- Sport: Weightlifting
- Club: Ankaragücü
Medal record
Women's weightlifting
Representing Turkey
European Championships
| Bronze medal – third place | 2021 Moscow | 45 kg |
European U23 Championships
| Gold medal – first place | 2022 Durrës | 45 kg |

Melisa Güneş (born 16 April 2001) is a Turkish weightlifter competing in the women's –45 kg division. She is a member of Ankaragücü in Ankara.

== Major results ==
She won the silver in the Snatch event and the bronze medal in the Clean and jerk event, taking the bronze medal in the total at the 2021 European Weightlifting Championships held in Moscow, Russia.

| Year | Venue | Weight | Snatch (kg) | | | | Clean & Jerk (kg) | | | | Total (kg) | Rank |
| Year | Venue | Weight | 1 | 2 | 3 | Rank | 1 | 2 | 3 | Rank | Total (kg) | Rank |
European Championships
| 2021 | Moscow, Russia | -45 kg | ~~63~~ | 63 | 68 | 2nd place, silver medalist(s) | 80 | 83 | ~~85~~ | 3rd place, bronze medalist(s) | 151 | 3rd place, bronze medalist(s) |
