= Garik Karapetyan =

Armenian weightlifter (born 2003)

Personal information
- Born: 11 June 2003 (age 23) Gyumri, Armenia

Sport
- Country: Armenia
- Sport: Weightlifting
- Weight class: 102 kg
- Coached by: Pashik Alaverdyan
Medal record
Men's weightlifting
Representing Armenia
European Championships
Gold medal – first place	2023 Yerevan	102 kg
Gold medal – first place	2025 Chișinău	109 kg
Gold medal – first place	2026 Batumi	110 kg
Bronze medal – third place	2024 Sofia	102 kg
European U23 Championships
Gold medal – first place	2025 Durres	110 kg

Garik Karapetyan (born 11 June 2003) is an Armenian weightlifter. A European Champion, he competed at the 2024 Summer Olympics.

== Career ==
=== Junior career ===
He won silver at the 2019 Youth World Weightlifting Championships in Las Vegas in the 89 kg category.

He won gold at the 2021 Junior World Weightlifting Championships in Tashkent in the 96 kg division. He won gold at the 2022 Junior World Weightlifting Championships in Heraklion, Greece in the 96 kg division.

He won his third consecutive junior gold medal at the 2023 Junior World Weightlifting Championships in Guadalajara, Mexico in the 102 kg category. He finished his junior career with three junior world records at this weight.

=== Senior career ===
He won gold at the 2023 European Weightlifting Championships in the 102 kg division in April 2023. His 178 kg snatch set a European youth record.

Competing at the 2023 World Weightlifting Championships in Riyadh, he snatched a new Junior world record of 183 kilograms whilst competing in the 102 kg category.

He won the bronze medal at the 2024 European Weightlifting Championships in Sofia, Bulgaria in the 102 kg category.

He placed fourth at the 2024 Paris Olympics in the Men's 102 kg division. He shared first place with China's Liu Huanhua after the Snatch with a 186 kg lift but missed out on medal after the Clean & Jerk having lifted 398 kg in total.

In April 2025 in Moldova, he won the gold medal in the 109 kg category ahead of his compatriot and two-time Olympic silver medallist and world record holder Simon Martirosyan at the 2025 European Weightlifting Championships. He won his third European title the following year, winning in the 110 kg category at the 2026 European Weightlifting Championships in Georgia.

== Major results ==
Year	Venue	Weight	Snatch (kg)				Clean & Jerk (kg)				Total	Rank
Year	Venue	Weight	1	2	3	Rank	1	2	3	Rank	Total	Rank
Olympic Games
2024	Paris, France	102 kg	180	~~186~~	186	—N/a	212	~~218~~	~~218~~	—N/a	398	4
World Championships
2023	Riyadh, Saudi Arabia	102 kg	175	~~183~~	183 JWR	2nd place, silver medalist(s)	210	~~217~~	~~217~~	12	393 JWR	5
2025	Førde, Norway	110 kg	~~186~~	~~186~~	187	3rd place, bronze medalist(s)	220	~~224~~	~~224~~	6	407	4
IWF World Cup
2024	Phuket, Thailand	102 kg	180	~~185~~	185	3rd place, bronze medalist(s)	212	216	—	5	401	2nd place, silver medalist(s)
European Championships
2023	Yerevan, Armenia	102 kg	172	~~178~~	178	1st place, gold medalist(s)	208	214	—	2nd place, silver medalist(s)	392	1st place, gold medalist(s)
2024	Sofia, Bulgaria	102 kg	177	182	~~187~~	1st place, gold medalist(s)	~~211~~	212	~~217~~	5	394	3rd place, bronze medalist(s)
2025	Chișinău, Moldova	109 kg	~~180~~	180	185	1st place, gold medalist(s)	212	220	226	1st place, gold medalist(s)	411	1st place, gold medalist(s)
2026	Batumi, Georgia	110 kg	183	~~189~~	189	3rd place, bronze medalist(s)	215	226	~~231~~	1st place, gold medalist(s)	415	1st place, gold medalist(s)

== Personal life ==
He lives in Gyumri and is coached by his father, Alexan Karapetyan, who was also a weightlifter. He attended Shirak State University.
