= Cristiano Ficco =

Italian weightlifter (born 2001)

Personal information
- Full name: Cristiano Giuseppe Ficco
- Born: 5 April 2001 (age 25)

Sport
- Country: Italy
- Sport: Weightlifting
Medal record
Men's weightlifting
Representing Italy
Mediterranean Games
Gold medal – first place	2018 Tarragona	85 kg S
Bronze medal – third place	2022 Oran	102 kg S
Bronze medal – third place	2026 Taranto	85 kg S
Bronze medal – third place	2026 Taranto	85 kg CJ
Summer Youth Olympics
Gold medal – first place	2018 Buenos Aires	85 kg
European Youth Weightlifting Championships
Gold medal – first place	2018 San Donato Milanese	85 kg
Silver medal – second place	2017 Pristina	94 kg

Cristiano Giuseppe Ficco (born 5 April 2001) is an Italian weightlifter. He won the gold medal in the 85 kg event at the 2018 Summer Youth Olympics held in Buenos Aires, Argentina.

At the 2018 Mediterranean Games held in Tarragona, Catalonia, Spain, he won the gold medal in the 85 kg Snatch event. At the 2021 European Junior & U23 Weightlifting Championships in Rovaniemi, Finland, he won the gold medal in his event.

He won the bronze medal in the men's 102 kg Snatch event at the 2022 Mediterranean Games held in Oran, Algeria.
