= Giulia Miserendino =

Italian weightlifter (born 2002)

Personal information
- Citizenship: Italia
- Born: 24 June 2002 (age 24)

Sport
- Sport: Weightlifting
- Weight class: 71 kg
Medal record
Women's weightlifting
Representing Italy
European Championships
Silver medal – second place	2023 Yerevan	71 kg
Mediterranean Games
Gold medal – first place	2026 Taranto	69 kg S
European U23 Championships
Bronze medal – third place	2025 Durres	69 kg

Giulia Miserendino (24 June 2002 in Palermo) is an Italian weightlifter.

== Career ==
She began her career as an athlete in 2015. At the Italian championships in Copertino in 2017 she placed fifth in the 63 kg category, in 2018 in Caltanissetta she placed second, in 2019 Ostia (Rome) she placed third and in 2021 San Marino she was first in the 64 kg category. In the same year she won the European Athletics U20 Championships in Rovaniemi, confirming herself in 2022 in Durrës. She moved up to the 71 kg category. At the 2022 World Championships in Bogotá she placed ninth, setting the Italian record with 233 kg. At the 2023 European Weightlifting Championship in Yerevan she won the silver medal with 230 kg in total.
