= 2023 European Junior and U23 Weightlifting Championships =

International youth weightlifting competition

- Venue: Sports Hall Agronomy University Campus
- Location: Bucharest, Romania
- Dates: 26 July–3 August

The 2023 European Junior and U23 Weightlifting Championships (50th in Junior and 14th in U23) took place in Bucharest, Romania from 26 July to 3 August 2023.

== Team ranking ==
| Rank | Men's Junior | | Women's Junior | | Men's Under-23 | | Women's Under-23 | |
| Rank | Team | Points | Team | Points | Team | Points | Team | Points |
|---|---|---|---|---|---|---|---|---|
| 1 | Armenia | 720 | Poland | 624 | Georgia | 686 | Romania | 506 |
| 2 | Georgia | 675 | Ukraine | 613 | Armenia | 477 | Turkey | 446 |
| 3 | Poland | 627 | Turkey | 534 | Ukraine | 458 | Ukraine | 367 |
| 4 | Turkey | 600 | Romania | 501 | Czech Republic | 329 | Czech Republic | 362 |
| 5 | Romania | 506 | Armenia | 401 | Poland | 327 | Italy | 361 |
| 6 | Ukraine | 484 | Spain | 370 | Romania | 322 | Poland | 319 |

== Medal table ==
=== Big ===
Ranking by Big (Total result) medals

* Host nation (Romania)

| Rank | Nation | Gold | Silver | Bronze | Total |
|---|---|---|---|---|---|
| 1 | Georgia | 9 | 4 | 3 | 16 |
| 2 | Turkey | 7 | 8 | 6 | 21 |
| 3 | Armenia | 5 | 6 | 6 | 17 |
| 4 | Romania* | 5 | 3 | 1 | 9 |
| 5 | Ukraine | 4 | 5 | 3 | 12 |
| 6 | Moldova | 3 | 1 | 1 | 5 |
| 7 | Italy | 2 | 3 | 3 | 8 |
| 8 | Poland | 2 | 1 | 5 | 8 |
| 9 | Germany | 1 | 2 | 3 | 6 |
| 10 | Austria | 1 | 0 | 0 | 1 |
| 10 | Netherlands | 1 | 0 | 0 | 1 |
| 12 | Spain | 0 | 2 | 1 | 3 |
| 13 | Azerbaijan | 0 | 1 | 0 | 1 |
| 13 | Belgium | 0 | 1 | 0 | 1 |
| 13 | Finland | 0 | 1 | 0 | 1 |
| 13 | Latvia | 0 | 1 | 0 | 1 |
| 13 | Norway | 0 | 1 | 0 | 1 |
| 18 | Sweden | 0 | 0 | 2 | 2 |
| 19 | Albania | 0 | 0 | 1 | 1 |
| 19 | Bulgaria | 0 | 0 | 1 | 1 |
| 19 | France | 0 | 0 | 1 | 1 |
| 19 | Great Britain | 0 | 0 | 1 | 1 |
| 19 | Iceland | 0 | 0 | 1 | 1 |
| 19 | Slovakia | 0 | 0 | 1 | 1 |
| Totals (24 entries) | | 40 | 40 | 40 | 120 |

=== Big and Small ===
Ranking by all medals: Big (Total result) and Small (Snatch and Clean & Jerk)

* Host nation (Romania)

| Rank | Nation | Gold | Silver | Bronze | Total |
|---|---|---|---|---|---|
| 1 | Georgia | 22 | 15 | 14 | 51 |
| 2 | Turkey | 21 | 23 | 13 | 57 |
| 3 | Armenia | 16 | 19 | 13 | 48 |
| 4 | Romania* | 14 | 8 | 4 | 26 |
| 5 | Ukraine | 12 | 12 | 10 | 34 |
| 6 | Moldova | 9 | 4 | 2 | 15 |
| 7 | Italy | 7 | 9 | 7 | 23 |
| 8 | Poland | 5 | 5 | 16 | 26 |
| 9 | Germany | 3 | 3 | 11 | 17 |
| 10 | Austria | 3 | 0 | 0 | 3 |
| 10 | Netherlands | 3 | 0 | 0 | 3 |
| 12 | Azerbaijan | 2 | 3 | 0 | 5 |
| 13 | Norway | 1 | 1 | 0 | 2 |
| 14 | Albania | 1 | 0 | 2 | 3 |
| 15 | Hungary | 1 | 0 | 0 | 1 |
| 16 | Spain | 0 | 5 | 5 | 10 |
| 17 | Finland | 0 | 3 | 1 | 4 |
| 17 | Latvia | 0 | 3 | 1 | 4 |
| 19 | Belgium | 0 | 3 | 0 | 3 |
| 20 | France | 0 | 1 | 2 | 3 |
| 20 | Slovakia | 0 | 1 | 2 | 3 |
| 22 | Czech Republic | 0 | 1 | 1 | 2 |
| 22 | Serbia | 0 | 1 | 1 | 2 |
| 24 | Sweden | 0 | 0 | 6 | 6 |
| 25 | Bulgaria | 0 | 0 | 3 | 3 |
| 26 | Great Britain | 0 | 0 | 2 | 2 |
| 26 | Iceland | 0 | 0 | 2 | 2 |
| 28 | Greece | 0 | 0 | 1 | 1 |
| 28 | Ireland | 0 | 0 | 1 | 1 |
| Totals (29 entries) | | 120 | 120 | 120 | 360 |

== Juniors ==
=== Men ===
| Event | Gold | | Silver | | Bronze | |
55 kg
| Snatch | Harun Algül (TUR) | 103 kg | Iulian Betca (MDA) | 99 kg | Andrii Revko (UKR) | 98 kg |
| Clean & Jerk | Harun Algül (TUR) | 123 kg | Andrii Revko (UKR) | 121 kg | Seyran Khudanyan (ARM) | 121 kg |
| Total | Harun Algül (TUR) | 226 kg | Andrii Revko (UKR) | 219 kg | Seyran Khudanyan (ARM) | 216 kg |
61 kg
| Snatch | Cosmin Isofache (ROU) | 121 kg | Giga Odikadze (GEO) | 117 kg | Mustafa Eliş (TUR) | 113 kg |
| Clean & Jerk | Cosmin Isofache (ROU) | 150 kg | Meruzhan Yeghoyan (ARM) | 144 kg | Mustafa Eliş (TUR) | 144 kg |
| Total | Cosmin Isofache (ROU) | 271 kg | Mustafa Eliş (TUR) | 257 kg | Meruzhan Yeghoyan (ARM) | 254 kg |
67 kg
| Snatch | Kaan Kahriman (TUR) | 137 kg | Tigran Karapetyan (ARM) | 123 kg | Marcin Wiatrowicz (POL) | 121 kg |
| Clean & Jerk | Kaan Kahriman (TUR) | 156 kg | Tigran Karapetyan (ARM) | 152 kg | Hubert Pietrzak (POL) | 145 kg |
| Total | Kaan Kahriman (TUR) | 293 kg | Tigran Karapetyan (ARM) | 275 kg | Hubert Pietrzak (POL) | 262 kg |
73 kg
| Snatch | Tiberiu Donose (ROU) | 146 kg | Gor Sahakyan (ARM) | 140 kg | Ismail Jamali Boulaayoun (ESP) | 140 kg |
| Clean & Jerk | Martin Poghosyan (ARM) | 172 kg | Gor Sahakyan (ARM) | 171 kg | Giorgi Kharazishvili (GEO) | 171 kg |
| Total | Tiberiu Donose (ROU) | 316 kg | Gor Sahakyan (ARM) | 311 kg | Martin Poghosyan (ARM) | 308 kg |
81 kg
| Snatch | Saba Asanidze (GEO) | 147 kg | Nikoloz Esartia (GEO) | 142 kg | Lucas Müller (GER) | 142 kg |
| Clean & Jerk | Saba Asanidze (GEO) | 180 kg | Mnatsakan Abrahamyan (ARM) | 175 kg | Lucas Müller (GER) | 175 kg |
| Total | Saba Asanidze (GEO) | 327 kg | Lucas Müller (GER) | 317 kg | Mnatsakan Abrahamyan (ARM) | 313 kg |
89 kg
| Snatch | Ertjan Kofsha (ALB) | 153 kg | Suren Grigoryan (ARM) | 150 kg | Zurab Mskhaladze (GEO) | 149 kg |
| Clean & Jerk | Suren Grigoryan (ARM) | 191 kg | Zurab Mskhaladze (GEO) | 190 kg | Ertjan Kofsha (ALB) | 184 kg |
| Total | Suren Grigoryan (ARM) | 341 kg | Zurab Mskhaladze (GEO) | 339 kg | Ertjan Kofsha (ALB) | 337 kg |
96 kg
| Snatch | Danylo Chyniakov (UKR) | 154 kg | Simone Abati (ITA) | 153 kg | Gervasi Tabagari (GEO) | 151 kg |
| Clean & Jerk | Gervasi Tabagari (GEO) | 192 kg | Tornike Lomtadze (GEO) | 186 kg | Feliks Gevorgyan (ARM) | 185 kg |
| Total | Gervasi Tabagari (GEO) | 343 kg | Danylo Chyniakov (UKR) | 338 kg | Simone Abati (ITA) | 336 kg |
102 kg
| Snatch | Garik Karapetyan (ARM) | 181 kg | Gurika Vekua (GEO) | 159 kg | Joen Vikingsson Sjöblom (SWE) | 158 kg |
| Clean & Jerk | Garik Karapetyan (ARM) | 205 kg | Gurika Vekua (GEO) | 200 kg | Muhammed Emin Burun (TUR) | 192 kg |
| Total | Garik Karapetyan (ARM) | 386 kg | Gurika Vekua (GEO) | 359 kg | Muhammed Emin Burun (TUR) | 349 kg |
109 kg
| Snatch | Giorgi Kirvalidze (GEO) | 165 kg | Ali Shukurlu (AZE) | 160 kg | Igor Osuch (POL) | 159 kg |
| Clean & Jerk | Ali Shukurlu (AZE) | 195 kg | Taner Çağlar (TUR) | 194 kg | Giorgi Kirvalidze (GEO) | 193 kg |
| Total | Giorgi Kirvalidze (GEO) | 358 kg | Ali Shukurlu (AZE) | 355 kg | Taner Çağlar (TUR) | 353 kg |
+109 kg
| Snatch | Ali Oflaz (TUR) | 161 kg | Vladimír Macura (SVK) | 159 kg | Onur Demirci (TUR) | 156 kg |
| Clean & Jerk | Ali Oflaz (TUR) | 203 kg | Onur Demirci (TUR) | 190 kg | Tomasz Talewicz (POL) | 187 kg |
| Total | Ali Oflaz (TUR) | 364 kg | Onur Demirci (TUR) | 346 kg | Vladimír Macura (SVK) | 345 kg |

=== Women ===
| Event | Gold | | Silver | | Bronze | |
45 kg
| Snatch | Cansu Bektaş (TUR) | 70 kg | Marta García (ESP) | 69 kg | Ruth Fuentefria (ESP) | 68 kg |
| Clean & Jerk | Cansu Bektaş (TUR) | 85 kg | Gamze Altun (TUR) | 84 kg | Marta García (ESP) | 83 kg |
| Total | Cansu Bektaş (TUR) | 155 kg | Marta García (ESP) | 152 kg | Gamze Altun (TUR) | 148 kg |
49 kg
| Snatch | Mariam Maisuradze (GEO) | 74 kg | Oliwia Drzazga (POL) | 72 kg | Yuliia Kovalova (UKR) | 70 kg |
| Clean & Jerk | Medine Bilicier (TUR) | 91 kg | Oliwia Drzazga (POL) | 89 kg | Maria Stratoudaki (GRE) | 89 kg |
| Total | Mariam Maisuradze (GEO) | 162 kg | Oliwia Drzazga (POL) | 161 kg | Medine Bilicier (TUR) | 160 kg |
55 kg
| Snatch | Andreea Cotruța (ROU) | 88 kg | Celine Delia (ITA) | 84 kg | Małgorzata Myjak (POL) | 83 kg |
| Clean & Jerk | Celine Delia (ITA) | 110 kg | Andreea Cotruța (ROU) | 110 kg | Małgorzata Myjak (POL) | 93 kg |
| Total | Andreea Cotruța (ROU) | 198 kg | Celine Delia (ITA) | 194 kg | Małgorzata Myjak (POL) | 176 kg |
59 kg
| Snatch | Svitlana Samuliak (UKR) | 98 kg | Olha Ivzhenko (UKR) | 91 kg | Greta De Riso (ITA) | 88 kg |
| Clean & Jerk | Svitlana Samuliak (UKR) | 117 kg | Olha Ivzhenko (UKR) | 113 kg | Aleksandra Grigoryan (ARM) | 112 kg |
| Total | Svitlana Samuliak (UKR) | 215 kg | Olha Ivzhenko (UKR) | 204 kg | Aleksandra Grigoryan (ARM) | 198 kg |
64 kg
| Snatch | Vitaliia Fylypiv (UKR) | 91 kg | Alice Halmac (ROU) | 90 kg | Anca Grosu (ROU) | 88 kg |
| Clean & Jerk | Anca Grosu (ROU) | 115 kg | Vitaliia Fylypiv (UKR) | 114 kg | Loane Payet (FRA) | 108 kg |
| Total | Vitaliia Fylypiv (UKR) | 205 kg | Anca Grosu (ROU) | 203 kg | Loane Payet (FRA) | 191 kg |
71 kg
| Snatch | Monika Marach (POL) | 98 kg | Janette Ylisoini (FIN) | 96 kg | Martyna Dołęga (POL) | 95 kg |
| Clean & Jerk | Martyna Dołęga (POL) | 121 kg | Janette Ylisoini (FIN) | 119 kg | Aino Luostarinen (FIN) | 116 kg |
| Total | Martyna Dołęga (POL) | 216 kg | Janette Ylisoini (FIN) | 215 kg | Monika Marach (POL) | 213 kg |
76 kg
| Snatch | Alexandrina Ciubotaru (MDA) | 93 kg | Burcu İldem Gerçekden (TUR) | 92 kg | Isabella Brown (GBR) | 90 kg |
| Clean & Jerk | Alexandrina Ciubotaru (MDA) | 117 kg | Burcu İldem Gerçekden (TUR) | 116 kg | Anna Amroyan (ARM) | 115 kg |
| Total | Alexandrina Ciubotaru (MDA) | 210 kg | Burcu İldem Gerçekden (TUR) | 208 kg | Isabella Brown (GBR) | 203 kg |
81 kg
| Snatch | Natia Gadelia (GEO) | 96 kg | Emma Poghosyan (ARM) | 90 kg | Fanny Köhler (SWE) | 80 kg |
| Clean & Jerk | Natia Gadelia (GEO) | 123 kg | Emma Poghosyan (ARM) | 121 kg | Fanny Köhler (SWE) | 93 kg |
| Total | Natia Gadelia (GEO) | 219 kg | Emma Poghosyan (ARM) | 211 kg | Fanny Köhler (SWE) | 173 kg |
87 kg
| Snatch | Mariam Murgvliani (GEO) | 102 kg | Büşra Çan (TUR) | 101 kg | Kiara Klug (GER) | 96 kg |
| Clean & Jerk | Mariam Murgvliani (GEO) | 127 kg | Büşra Çan (TUR) | 125 kg | Kiara Klug (GER) | 115 kg |
| Total | Mariam Murgvliani (GEO) | 229 kg | Büşra Çan (TUR) | 226 kg | Kiara Klug (GER) | 211 kg |
+87 kg
| Snatch | Tuana Süren (TUR) | 106 kg | Fatmagül Çevik (TUR) | 105 kg | Julieta Avanesyan (ARM) | 96 kg |
| Clean & Jerk | Tuana Süren (TUR) | 133 kg | Fatmagül Çevik (TUR) | 129 kg | Hanna Kalashnyk (UKR) | 119 kg |
| Total | Tuana Süren (TUR) | 239 kg | Fatmagül Çevik (TUR) | 234 kg | Julieta Avanesyan (ARM) | 214 kg |

== Under-23 ==
=== Men ===
| Event | Gold | | Silver | | Bronze | |
55 kg
| Snatch | Federico La Barbera (ITA) | 100 kg | František Polák (CZE) | 100 kg | Bachuki Shamilishvili (GEO) | 99 kg |
| Clean & Jerk | Federico La Barbera (ITA) | 126 kg | Valentin Iancu (ROU) | 125 kg | Bachuki Shamilishvili (GEO) | 123 kg |
| Total | Federico La Barbera (ITA) | 226 kg | Valentin Iancu (ROU) | 223 kg | Bachuki Shamilishvili (GEO) | 222 kg |
61 kg
| Snatch | Garnik Cholakyan (ARM) | 115 kg | José Perales (ESP) | 107 kg | Aleksandar Saulić (SRB) | 100 kg |
| Clean & Jerk | Garnik Cholakyan (ARM) | 140 kg | José Perales (ESP) | 131 kg | Andy Toha (SWE) | 126 kg |
| Total | Garnik Cholakyan (ARM) | 255 kg | José Perales (ESP) | 238 kg | Andy Toha (SWE) | 224 kg |
67 kg
| Snatch | Gurami Giorbelidze (GEO) | 129 kg | Andrea Corbu (ITA) | 128 kg | Robert Florea (ROU) | 114 kg |
| Clean & Jerk | Gurami Giorbelidze (GEO) | 161 kg | Andrea Corbu (ITA) | 159 kg | Robert Florea (ROU) | 145 kg |
| Total | Gurami Giorbelidze (GEO) | 290 kg | Andrea Corbu (ITA) | 287 kg | Robert Florea (ROU) | 259 kg |
73 kg
| Snatch | Omar Javadov (AZE) | 152 kg | Kakhi Asanidze (GEO) | 151 kg | Archil Malakmadze (GEO) | 150 kg |
| Clean & Jerk | Muhammed Furkan Özbek (TUR) | 185 kg | Kakhi Asanidze (GEO) | 178 kg | Archil Malakmadze (GEO) | 168 kg |
| Total | Muhammed Furkan Özbek (TUR) | 330 kg | Kakhi Asanidze (GEO) | 329 kg | Archil Malakmadze (GEO) | 318 kg |
81 kg
| Snatch | Rafik Harutyunyan (ARM) | 150 kg | Roberto Gutu (GER) | 147 kg | Sebastián Cabala (SVK) | 146 kg |
| Clean & Jerk | Rafik Harutyunyan (ARM) | 180 kg | Fugan Aliyev (AZE) | 179 kg | Patryk Bęben (POL) | 178 kg |
| Total | Rafik Harutyunyan (ARM) | 330 kg | Karen Margaryan (ARM) | 323 kg | Patryk Bęben (POL) | 320 kg |
89 kg
| Snatch | Marin Robu (MDA) | 170 kg | Armands Mežinskis (LAT) | 161 kg | Maksym Dombrovskyi (UKR) | 154 kg |
| Clean & Jerk | Marin Robu (MDA) | 203 kg | Armands Mežinskis (LAT) | 198 kg | Maksym Dombrovskyi (UKR) | 190 kg |
| Total | Marin Robu (MDA) | 373 kg | Armands Mežinskis (LAT) | 359 kg | Maksym Dombrovskyi (UKR) | 344 kg |
96 kg
| Snatch | Raphael Friedrich (GER) | 162 kg | Irakli Gobejishvili (GEO) | 161 kg | Oleh Nikolaienko (UKR) | 155 kg |
| Clean & Jerk | Ara Aghanyan (ARM) | 197 kg | Irakli Gobejishvili (GEO) | 196 kg | Raphael Friedrich (GER) | 196 kg |
| Total | Raphael Friedrich (GER) | 358 kg | Irakli Gobejishvili (GEO) | 357 kg | Anatolii Horidko (UKR) | 347 kg |
102 kg
| Snatch | Tudor Bratu (MDA) | 168 kg | Dmytro Kurdybakha (UKR) | 162 kg | Bartłomiej Adamus (POL) | 157 kg |
| Clean & Jerk | Tudor Bratu (MDA) | 202 kg | Illia Moskalenko (UKR) | 201 kg | Bartłomiej Adamus (POL) | 193 kg |
| Total | Tudor Bratu (MDA) | 370 kg | Illia Moskalenko (UKR) | 351 kg | Bartłomiej Adamus (POL) | 350 kg |
109 kg
| Snatch | Yasha Minasyan (ARM) | 163 kg | Petros Petrosyan (ARM) | 163 kg | Akaki Talakhadze (GEO) | 162 kg |
| Clean & Jerk | Zaza Lomtadze (GEO) | 210 kg | Petros Petrosyan (ARM) | 207 kg | Vladyslav Prylypko (UKR) | 200 kg |
| Total | Zaza Lomtadze (GEO) | 371 kg | Petros Petrosyan (ARM) | 370 kg | Vladyslav Prylypko (UKR) | 361 kg |
+109 kg
| Snatch | Tornike Tabatadze (GEO) | 170 kg | Olaf Pasikowski (POL) | 163 kg | Mikheil Adamia (GEO) | 162 kg |
| Clean & Jerk | Ragnar Holme (NOR) | 204 kg | Tornike Tabatadze (GEO) | 202 kg | Mikheil Adamia (GEO) | 201 kg |
| Total | Tornike Tabatadze (GEO) | 372 kg | Ragnar Holme (NOR) | 364 kg | Mikheil Adamia (GEO) | 363 kg |

=== Women ===
| Event | Gold | | Silver | | Bronze | |
45 kg
| Snatch | Bianca Dumitrescu (ROU) | 63 kg | Ecaterina Grabucea (MDA) | 60 kg | Nadezhda Nguen (BUL) | 57 kg |
| Clean & Jerk | Bianca Dumitrescu (ROU) | 80 kg | Ecaterina Grabucea (MDA) | 73 kg | Nadezhda Nguen (BUL) | 70 kg |
| Total | Bianca Dumitrescu (ROU) | 143 kg | Ecaterina Grabucea (MDA) | 133 kg | Nadezhda Nguen (BUL) | 127 kg |
49 kg
| Snatch | Mihaela Cambei (ROU) | 90 kg | Radmila Zagorac (SRB) | 74 kg | Duygu Alıcı (TUR) | 73 kg |
| Clean & Jerk | Mihaela Cambei (ROU) | 105 kg | Ruslana Kuzikova (UKR) | 93 kg | Duygu Alıcı (TUR) | 91 kg |
| Total | Mihaela Cambei (ROU) | 195 kg | Ruslana Kuzikova (UKR) | 165 kg | Duygu Alıcı (TUR) | 164 kg |
55 kg
| Snatch | Annika Pilz (GER) | 80 kg | Monika Szymanek (POL) | 79 kg | Burcu Alıcı (TUR) | 78 kg |
| Clean & Jerk | Monika Szymanek (POL) | 105 kg | Burcu Alıcı (TUR) | 104 kg | Annika Pilz (GER) | 103 kg |
| Total | Monika Szymanek (POL) | 184 kg | Annika Pilz (GER) | 183 kg | Burcu Alıcı (TUR) | 182 kg |
59 kg
| Snatch | Kamila Konotop (UKR) | 107 kg | Nina Sterckx (BEL) | 93 kg | Chiara Piccinno (ITA) | 91 kg |
| Clean & Jerk | Kamila Konotop (UKR) | 130 kg | Nina Sterckx (BEL) | 120 kg | Chiara Piccinno (ITA) | 109 kg |
| Total | Kamila Konotop (UKR) | 237 kg | Nina Sterckx (BEL) | 213 kg | Chiara Piccinno (ITA) | 200 kg |
64 kg
| Snatch | Mariia Hanhur (UKR) | 96 kg | Aysel Özkan (TUR) | 93 kg | Wiktoria Wołk (POL) | 92 kg |
| Clean & Jerk | Mariia Hanhur (UKR) | 116 kg | Vicky Graillot (FRA) | 115 kg | Martina Chiacchio (ITA) | 114 kg |
| Total | Mariia Hanhur (UKR) | 212 kg | Aysel Özkan (TUR) | 206 kg | Martina Chiacchio (ITA) | 205 kg |
71 kg
| Snatch | Giulia Miserendino (ITA) | 107 kg | Nuray Güngör (TUR) | 102 kg | Lara Dancz (GER) | 101 kg |
| Clean & Jerk | Giulia Miserendino (ITA) | 123 kg | Nuray Güngör (TUR) | 118 kg | Daniela Ivanova (LAT) | 118 kg |
| Total | Giulia Miserendino (ITA) | 230 kg | Nuray Güngör (TUR) | 220 kg | Lara Dancz (GER) | 216 kg |
76 kg
| Snatch | Dilara Narin (TUR) | 97 kg | Genna Toko Kegne (ITA) | 95 kg | Amelie Hörner (GER) | 94 kg |
| Clean & Jerk | Dilara Narin (TUR) | 126 kg | Genna Toko Kegne (ITA) | 120 kg | Keilin Coleman (IRL) | 115 kg |
| Total | Dilara Narin (TUR) | 223 kg | Genna Toko Kegne (ITA) | 215 kg | Amelie Hörner (GER) | 208 kg |
81 kg
| Snatch | Nikki Löwik (NED) | 102 kg | Sara Yenigün (TUR) | 99 kg | Simona Jeřábková (CZE) | 83 kg |
| Clean & Jerk | Nikki Löwik (NED) | 129 kg | Sara Yenigün (TUR) | 124 kg | Anastasia Cîlcic (MDA) | 106 kg |
| Total | Nikki Löwik (NED) | 231 kg | Sara Yenigün (TUR) | 223 kg | Anastasia Cîlcic (MDA) | 189 kg |
87 kg
| Snatch | Veronika Mitykó (HUN) | 100 kg | Alexandra Alexe (ROU) | 96 kg | Liana Gyurjyan (ARM) | 96 kg |
| Clean & Jerk | Liana Gyurjyan (ARM) | 125 kg | Alexandra Alexe (ROU) | 120 kg | Irene Blanco (ESP) | 118 kg |
| Total | Liana Gyurjyan (ARM) | 221 kg | Alexandra Alexe (ROU) | 216 kg | Irene Blanco (ESP) | 213 kg |
+87 kg
| Snatch | Sarah Fischer (AUT) | 105 kg | Meri Tumasyan (ARM) | 93 kg | Luiza Sahradyan (ARM) | 89 kg |
| Clean & Jerk | Sarah Fischer (AUT) | 135 kg | Meri Tumasyan (ARM) | 115 kg | Erla Ágústsdóttir (ISL) | 113 kg |
| Total | Sarah Fischer (AUT) | 240 kg | Meri Tumasyan (ARM) | 208 kg | Erla Ágústsdóttir (ISL) | 201 kg |

== Participating nations ==
384 athletes from 37 nations.

- Albania (4)
- Armenia (26)
- Austria (7)
- Azerbaijan (5)
- Belgium (4)
- Bosnia and Herzegovina (1)
- Bulgaria (5)
- Croatia (4)
- Czech Republic (17)
- Denmark (5)
- Estonia (1)
- Finland (16)
- France (7)
- Georgia (23)
- Germany (14)
- Great Britain (9)
- Greece (8)
- Hungary (7)
- Iceland (5)
- Ireland (5)
- Israel (10)
- Italy (12)
- Kosovo (2)
- Latvia (4)
- Lithuania (5)
- Malta (1)
- Moldova (16)
- Netherlands (2)
- Norway (8)
- Poland (30)
- Romania (32)
- Serbia (3)
- Slovakia (9)
- Spain (18)
- Sweden (8)
- Turkey (22)
- Ukraine (29)
