= 2022 European Weightlifting Championships =

Weightlifting competition in Tirana, Albania

- Venue: Tirana Olympic Park
- Location: Tirana, Albania
- Dates: 28 May – 5 June
- Competitors: 285 from 39 nations

The 2022 European Weightlifting Championships was held in Tirana, Albania, from 28 May to 5 June 2022. The event was initially scheduled to be held in Sofia, Bulgaria, but this changed after a leadership dispute.

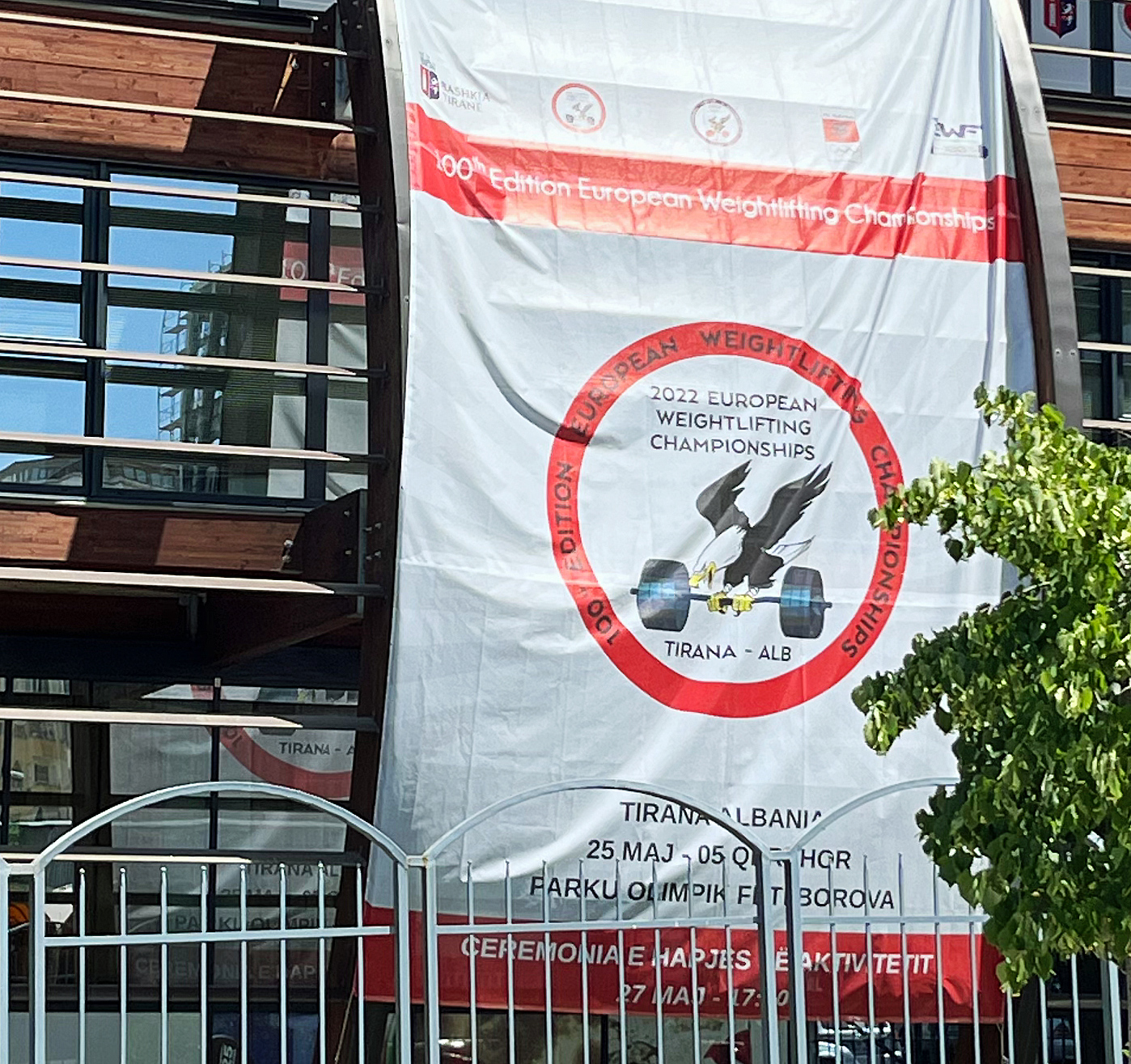
Poster ad for the championships at the venue in Tirana

== Medal table ==
Ranking by Big (Total result) medals

* Host nation (Albania)

| Rank | Nation | Gold | Silver | Bronze | Total |
|---|---|---|---|---|---|
| 1 | Bulgaria | 5 | 1 | 2 | 8 |
| 2 | Ukraine | 2 | 4 | 1 | 7 |
| 3 | Armenia | 2 | 3 | 2 | 7 |
| 3 | Turkey | 2 | 3 | 2 | 7 |
| 5 | Italy | 2 | 1 | 0 | 3 |
| 6 | France | 2 | 0 | 2 | 4 |
| 7 | Georgia | 1 | 3 | 2 | 6 |
| 8 | Norway | 1 | 0 | 1 | 2 |
| 9 | Albania* | 1 | 0 | 0 | 1 |
| 9 | Great Britain | 1 | 0 | 0 | 1 |
| 9 | Sweden | 1 | 0 | 0 | 1 |
| 12 | Spain | 0 | 2 | 3 | 5 |
| 13 | Germany | 0 | 2 | 0 | 2 |
| 14 | Latvia | 0 | 1 | 0 | 1 |
| 15 | Poland | 0 | 0 | 2 | 2 |
| 16 | Austria | 0 | 0 | 1 | 1 |
| 16 | Belgium | 0 | 0 | 1 | 1 |
| 16 | Serbia | 0 | 0 | 1 | 1 |
| Totals (18 entries) | | 20 | 20 | 20 | 60 |

Ranking by all medals: Big (Total result) and Small (Snatch and Clean & Jerk)

* Host nation (Albania)

| Rank | Nation | Gold | Silver | Bronze | Total |
|---|---|---|---|---|---|
| 1 | Bulgaria | 13 | 5 | 5 | 23 |
| 2 | Ukraine | 7 | 9 | 5 | 21 |
| 3 | Turkey | 6 | 10 | 7 | 23 |
| 4 | Italy | 6 | 2 | 2 | 10 |
| 5 | France | 5 | 2 | 2 | 9 |
| 6 | Armenia | 4 | 9 | 6 | 19 |
| 7 | Georgia | 4 | 7 | 5 | 16 |
| 8 | Norway | 4 | 0 | 1 | 5 |
| 9 | Albania* | 3 | 1 | 0 | 4 |
| 10 | Great Britain | 3 | 0 | 0 | 3 |
| 11 | Spain | 2 | 5 | 7 | 14 |
| 12 | Sweden | 2 | 0 | 1 | 3 |
| 13 | Germany | 1 | 4 | 3 | 8 |
| 14 | Poland | 0 | 2 | 2 | 4 |
| 15 | Latvia | 0 | 2 | 0 | 2 |
| 16 | Moldova | 0 | 1 | 2 | 3 |
| 17 | Denmark | 0 | 1 | 0 | 1 |
| 18 | Austria | 0 | 0 | 4 | 4 |
| 19 | Belgium | 0 | 0 | 3 | 3 |
| 19 | Serbia | 0 | 0 | 3 | 3 |
| 21 | Czech Republic | 0 | 0 | 1 | 1 |
| 21 | Greece | 0 | 0 | 1 | 1 |
| Totals (22 entries) | | 60 | 60 | 60 | 180 |

== Schedule ==
Men's events
| Date → Event ↓ | 28 | 29 | 30 | 31 | 1 | 2 | 3 | 4 | 5 |
|---|---|---|---|---|---|---|---|---|---|
| 55 kg | | ● | | | | | | | |
| 61 kg | | ● | | | | | | | |
| 67 kg | | | ● | | | | | | |
| 73 kg | | | | ● | | | | | |
| 81 kg | | | | | ● | | | | |
| 89 kg | | | | | | ● | | | |
| 96 kg | | | | | | | ● | | |
| 102 kg | | | | | | | | ● | |
| 109 kg | | | | | | | | ● | |
| +109 kg | | | | | | | | | ● |

Women's events
| Date → Event ↓ | 28 | 29 | 30 | 31 | 1 | 2 | 3 | 4 | 5 |
|---|---|---|---|---|---|---|---|---|---|
| 45 kg | ● | | | | | | | | |
| 49 kg | ● | | | | | | | | |
| 55 kg | | ● | | | | | | | |
| 59 kg | | | ● | | | | | | |
| 64 kg | | | | ● | | | | | |
| 71 kg | | | | | ● | | | | |
| 76 kg | | | | | | ● | | | |
| 81 kg | | | | | | | ● | | |
| 87 kg | | | | | | | | ● | |
| +87 kg | | | | | | | | | ● |

== Medal overview ==
=== Men ===
| Event | | Gold | | Silver | | Bronze | |
| – 55 kg | Snatch | Josué Brachi (ESP) | 115 kg | Goderdzi Berdelidze (GEO) | 114 kg | Angel Rusev (BUL) | 113 kg |
| – 55 kg | Clean & Jerk | Angel Rusev (BUL) | 144 kg | Josué Brachi (ESP) | 141 kg | Dmytro Voronovskyi (UKR) | 134 kg |
| – 55 kg | Total | Angel Rusev (BUL) | 257 kg | Josué Brachi (ESP) | 256 kg | Dmytro Voronovskyi (UKR) | 242 kg |
| – 61 kg | Snatch | Ivan Dimov (BUL) | 135 kg | Simon Brandhuber (GER) | 134 kg | Ferdi Hardal (TUR) | 131 kg |
| – 61 kg | Clean & Jerk | Gabriel Marinov (BUL) | 157 kg | Jon Luke Mau (GER) | 156 kg | Simon Brandhuber (GER) | 152 kg |
| – 61 kg | Total | Ivan Dimov (BUL) | 286 kg | Simon Brandhuber (GER) | 286 kg | Gabriel Marinov (BUL) | 279 kg |
| – 67 kg | Snatch | Shota Mishvelidze (GEO) | 142 kg | Valentin Genchev (BUL) | 139 kg | Acorán Hernández (ESP) | 138 kg |
| – 67 kg | Clean & Jerk | Valentin Genchev (BUL) | 175 kg | Yusuf Fehmi Genç (TUR) | 167 kg | Shota Mishvelidze (GEO) | 165 kg |
| – 67 kg | Total | Valentin Genchev (BUL) | 314 kg | Shota Mishvelidze (GEO) | 307 kg | Acorán Hernández (ESP) | 299 kg |
| – 73 kg | Snatch | Erkand Qerimaj (ALB) | 150 kg | Kakhi Asanidze (GEO) | 150 kg | Muhammed Furkan Özbek (TUR) | 149 kg |
| – 73 kg | Clean & Jerk | Muhammed Furkan Özbek (TUR) | 190 kg | Piotr Kudłaszyk (POL) | 181 kg | Kakhi Asanidze (GEO) | 176 kg |
| – 73 kg | Total | Muhammed Furkan Özbek (TUR) | 339 kg | Kakhi Asanidze (GEO) | 326 kg | Piotr Kudłaszyk (POL) | 324 kg |
| – 81 kg | Snatch | Andrés Mata (ESP) | 160 kg | Rafik Harutyunyan (ARM) | 160 kg | Bozhidar Andreev (BUL) | 153 kg |
| – 81 kg | Clean & Jerk | Rafik Harutyunyan (ARM) | 194 kg | Bozhidar Andreev (BUL) | 190 kg | Andrés Mata (ESP) | 186 kg |
| – 81 kg | Total | Rafik Harutyunyan (ARM) | 354 kg | Andrés Mata (ESP) | 346 kg | Bozhidar Andreev (BUL) | 343 kg |
| – 89 kg | Snatch | Antonino Pizzolato (ITA) | 175 kg | Andranik Karapetyan (ARM) | 174 kg | Karlos Nasar (BUL) | 171 kg |
| – 89 kg | Clean & Jerk | Antonino Pizzolato (ITA) | 217 kg WR | Karlos Nasar (BUL) | 211 kg | Cristiano Ficco (ITA) | 206 kg |
| – 89 kg | Total | Antonino Pizzolato (ITA) | 392 kg WR | Karlos Nasar (BUL) | 382 kg | Revaz Davitadze (GEO) | 369 kg |
| – 96 kg | Snatch | Davit Hovhannisyan (ARM) | 171 kg | Ara Aghanyan (ARM) | 170 kg | Tudor Bratu (MDA) | 165 kg |
| – 96 kg | Clean & Jerk | Romain Imadouchène (FRA) | 210 kg | Maksym Dombrovskyi (UKR) | 207 kg | Davit Hovhannisyan (ARM) | 206 kg |
| – 96 kg | Total | Davit Hovhannisyan (ARM) | 377 kg | Ara Aghanyan (ARM) | 375 kg | Romain Imadouchène (FRA) | 370 kg |
| – 102 kg | Snatch | David Fischerov (BUL) | 177 kg | Marcos Ruiz (ESP) | 176 kg | Samvel Gasparyan (ARM) | 176 kg |
| – 102 kg | Clean & Jerk | David Fischerov (BUL) | 215 kg | Samvel Gasparyan (ARM) | 214 kg | Marcos Ruiz (ESP) | 208 kg |
| – 102 kg | Total | David Fischerov (BUL) | 392 kg | Samvel Gasparyan (ARM) | 390 kg | Marcos Ruiz (ESP) | 384 kg |
| – 109 kg | Snatch | Hristo Hristov (BUL) | 180 kg | Giorgi Chkheidze (GEO) | 174 kg | Sargis Martirosjan (AUT) | 172 kg |
| – 109 kg | Clean & Jerk | Hristo Hristov (BUL) | 211 kg | Giorgi Chkheidze (GEO) | 210 kg | Onur Demirci (TUR) | 202 kg |
| – 109 kg | Total | Hristo Hristov (BUL) | 391 kg | Giorgi Chkheidze (GEO) | 384 kg | Arsen Martirosyan (ARM) | 371 kg |
| + 109 kg | Snatch | Lasha Talakhadze (GEO) | 217 kg | Varazdat Lalayan (ARM) | 211 kg | Gor Minasyan (ARM) | 210 kg |
| + 109 kg | Clean & Jerk | Lasha Talakhadze (GEO) | 245 kg | Varazdat Lalayan (ARM) | 240 kg | Jiří Orság (CZE) | 237 kg |
| + 109 kg | Total | Lasha Talakhadze (GEO) | 462 kg | Varazdat Lalayan (ARM) | 451 kg | Gor Minasyan (ARM) | 446 kg |

=== Women ===
| Event | | Gold | | Silver | | Bronze | |
| – 45 kg | Snatch | Şaziye Erdoğan (TUR) | 73 kg | Teodora-Luminița Hîncu (MDA) | 68 kg | Radmila Zagorac (SRB) | 68 kg |
| – 45 kg | Clean & Jerk | Şaziye Erdoğan (TUR) | 90 kg | Cansu Bektaş (TUR) | 85 kg | Radmila Zagorac (SRB) | 84 kg |
| – 45 kg | Total | Şaziye Erdoğan (TUR) | 163 kg | Cansu Bektaş (TUR) | 153 kg | Radmila Zagorac (SRB) | 152 kg |
| – 49 kg | Snatch | Anhelina Lomachynska (UKR) | 80 kg | Giulia Imperio (ITA) | 79 kg | María Giménez-Guervós (ESP) | 72 kg |
| – 49 kg | Clean & Jerk | Giulia Imperio (ITA) | 92 kg | María Giménez-Guervós (ESP) | 91 kg | Anhelina Lomachynska (UKR) | 87 kg |
| – 49 kg | Total | Giulia Imperio (ITA) | 171 kg | Anhelina Lomachynska (UKR) | 167 kg | María Giménez-Guervós (ESP) | 163 kg |
| – 55 kg | Snatch | Evagjelia Veli (ALB) | 95 kg | Kamila Konotop (UKR) | 94 kg | Nina Sterckx (BEL) | 94 kg |
| – 55 kg | Clean & Jerk | Kamila Konotop (UKR) | 113 kg | Evagjelia Veli (ALB) | 113 kg | Nina Sterckx (BEL) | 111 kg |
| – 55 kg | Total | Evagjelia Veli (ALB) | 208 kg | Kamila Konotop (UKR) | 207 kg | Nina Sterckx (BEL) | 205 kg |
| – 59 kg | Snatch | Lucrezia Magistris (ITA) | 98 kg | Dora Tchakounté (FRA) | 96 kg | Sofia Georgopoulou (GRE) | 94 kg |
| – 59 kg | Clean & Jerk | Ine Andersson (NOR) | 118 kg | Dora Tchakounté (FRA) | 117 kg | Lucrezia Magistris (ITA) | 114 kg |
| – 59 kg | Total | Dora Tchakounté (FRA) | 213 kg | Lucrezia Magistris (ITA) | 212 kg | Ine Andersson (NOR) | 208 kg |
| – 64 kg | Snatch | Mariia Hanhur (UKR) | 102 kg | Nuray Güngör (TUR) | 99 kg | Daniela Gherman (SWE) | 96 kg |
| – 64 kg | Clean & Jerk | Nuray Güngör (TUR) | 120 kg | Berfin Altun (TUR) | 120 kg | Mariia Hanhur (UKR) | 120 kg |
| – 64 kg | Total | Mariia Hanhur (UKR) | 222 kg | Nuray Güngör (TUR) | 219 kg | Vicky Graillot (FRA) | 208 kg |
| – 71 kg | Snatch | Lisa Schweizer (GER) | 103 kg | Monika Marach (POL) | 99 kg | Aysel Özkan (TUR) | 98 kg |
| – 71 kg | Clean & Jerk | Patricia Strenius (SWE) | 130 kg | Line Ravn Gude (DEN) | 121 kg | Lisa Schweizer (GER) | 120 kg |
| – 71 kg | Total | Patricia Strenius (SWE) | 224 kg | Lisa Schweizer (GER) | 223 kg | Monika Marach (POL) | 215 kg |
| – 76 kg | Snatch | Marie Fegue (FRA) | 110 kg | Maria Kireva (BUL) | 104 kg | Tatev Hakobyan (ARM) | 104 kg |
| – 76 kg | Clean & Jerk | Marie Fegue (FRA) | 135 kg | Daniela Ivanova (LAT) | 126 kg | Dilara Uçan (TUR) | 121 kg |
| – 76 kg | Total | Marie Fegue (FRA) | 245 kg | Daniela Ivanova (LAT) | 222 kg | Dilara Uçan (TUR) | 220 kg |
| – 81 kg | Snatch | Iryna Dekha (UKR) | 116 kg | Alina Marushchak (UKR) | 108 kg | Nina Schroth (GER) | 101 kg |
| – 81 kg | Clean & Jerk | Iryna Dekha (UKR) | 137 kg | Dilara Narin (TUR) | 133 kg | Alina Marushchak (UKR) | 127 kg |
| – 81 kg | Total | Iryna Dekha (UKR) | 253 kg | Alina Marushchak (UKR) | 235 kg | Dilara Narin (TUR) | 232 kg |
| – 87 kg | Snatch | Solfrid Koanda (NOR) | 109 kg | Anastasiia Manievska (UKR) | 107 kg | Anastasiia Hotfrid (GEO) | 106 kg |
| – 87 kg | Clean & Jerk | Solfrid Koanda (NOR) | 143 kg | Anastasiia Manievska (UKR) | 130 kg | Elena Cîlcic (MDA) | 129 kg |
| – 87 kg | Total | Solfrid Koanda (NOR) | 252 kg | Anastasiia Manievska (UKR) | 237 kg | Anastasiia Hotfrid (GEO) | 235 kg |
| + 87 kg | Snatch | Emily Campbell (GBR) | 118 kg | Melike Günal (TUR) | 108 kg | Sarah Fischer (AUT) | 102 kg |
| + 87 kg | Clean & Jerk | Emily Campbell (GBR) | 153 kg | Melike Günal (TUR) | 134 kg | Sarah Fischer (AUT) | 128 kg |
| + 87 kg | Total | Emily Campbell (GBR) | 271 kg | Melike Günal (TUR) | 242 kg | Sarah Fischer (AUT) | 230 kg |

== Team ranking ==
=== Men ===
| Rank | Team | Points |
|---|---|---|
| 1 | Bulgaria | 746 |
| 2 | Armenia | 667 |
| 3 | Georgia | 647 |
| 4 | Czech Republic | 535 |
| 5 | Poland | 378 |
| 6 | Turkey | 370 |
| 7 | Ukraine | 344 |
| 8 | Great Britain | 339 |
| 9 | Spain | 330 |
| 10 | Albania | 320 |

=== Women ===
| Rank | Team | Points |
|---|---|---|
| 1 | Turkey | 690 |
| 2 | Ukraine | 686 |
| 3 | Great Britain | 381 |
| 4 | Norway | 379 |
| 5 | Denmark | 363 |
| 6 | Spain | 356 |
| 7 | Moldova | 315 |
| 8 | France | 283 |
| 9 | Netherlands | 267 |
| 10 | Sweden | 251 |

== Participating countries ==
A total of 285 competitors from 39 nations participated.

- Albania (12)
- Armenia (13)
- Austria (4)
- Azerbaijan (1)
- Belgium (4)
- Bosnia and Herzegovina (3)
- Bulgaria (13)
- Croatia (5)
- Czech Republic (15)
- Denmark (12)
- Estonia (2)
- Finland (9)
- France (5)
- Georgia (11)
- Germany (7)
- Great Britain (15)
- Greece (4)
- Hungary (5)
- Iceland (2)
- Ireland (5)
- Israel (5)
- Italy (6)
- Kosovo (2)
- Latvia (5)
- Lithuania (5)
- Luxembourg (1)
- Malta (1)
- Moldova (12)
- Netherlands (10)
- Norway (9)
- Poland (11)
- Serbia (2)
- Slovakia (12)
- Slovenia (1)
- Spain (12)
- Sweden (6)
- Switzerland (2)
- Turkey (18)
- Ukraine (18)
- Belarusian and Russian weightlifters were not allowed to compete at the event after a ban as a result of the Russian invasion of Ukraine.

=== Most participants ===
| Rank | Country | Athletes |
|---|---|---|
| 1 | Turkey | 18 |
| 1 | Ukraine | 18 |
| 3 | Czech Republic | 15 |
| 3 | Great Britain | 15 |
| 5 | Armenia | 13 |
| 5 | Bulgaria | 13 |
| 7 | Albania | 12 |
| 7 | Denmark | 12 |
| 7 | Moldova | 12 |
| 7 | Slovakia | 12 |
| 7 | Spain | 12 |

== Men's results ==
=== Men's 55 kg ===
| Rank | Athlete | Group | Body weight | Snatch (kg) | | | | Clean & Jerk (kg) | | | | Total |
| Rank | Athlete | Group | Body weight | 1 | 2 | 3 | Rank | 1 | 2 | 3 | Rank | Total |
|---|---|---|---|---|---|---|---|---|---|---|---|---|
| 1st place, gold medalist(s) | Angel Rusev (BUL) | A | | 108 | 111 | 113 | 3rd place, bronze medalist(s) | 138 | 144 | ~~148~~ | 1st place, gold medalist(s) | 257 |
| 2nd place, silver medalist(s) | Josué Brachi (ESP) | A | | 112 | 115 | ~~117~~ | 1st place, gold medalist(s) | 135 | 139 | 141 | 2nd place, silver medalist(s) | 256 |
| 3rd place, bronze medalist(s) | Dmytro Voronovskyi (UKR) | A | | 108 | ~~112~~ | ~~112~~ | 5 | ~~133~~ | 134 | ~~140~~ | 3rd place, bronze medalist(s) | 242 |
| 4 | Deniz Danev (BUL) | A | | 90 | 93 | 95 | 6 | 110 | 120 | 125 | 4 | 220 |
| 5 | Iulian Betca (MDA) | A | | 88 | 92 | ~~95~~ | 7 | 105 | 109 | 112 | 5 | 204 |
| 6 | Alexandr Džobák (CZE) | A | | 81 | ~~86~~ | 86 | 8 | 100 | 106 | 110 | 6 | 196 |
| — | Goderdzi Berdelidze (GEO) | A | | 111 | ~~114~~ | 114 | 2nd place, silver medalist(s) | ~~134~~ | ~~134~~ | ~~134~~ | — | — |
| — | Muammer Şahin (TUR) | A | | ~~108~~ | 109 | ~~113~~ | 4 | — | — | — | — | — |
| — | Muhammet Akkaya (TUR) | A | | ~~103~~ | ~~103~~ | ~~103~~ | — | ~~120~~ | — | — | — | — |

=== Men's 61 kg ===
| Rank | Athlete | Group | Body weight | Snatch (kg) | | | | Clean & Jerk (kg) | | | | Total |
| Rank | Athlete | Group | Body weight | 1 | 2 | 3 | Rank | 1 | 2 | 3 | Rank | Total |
|---|---|---|---|---|---|---|---|---|---|---|---|---|
| 1st place, gold medalist(s) | Ivan Dimov (BUL) | A | | 130 | ~~133~~ | 135 | 1st place, gold medalist(s) | 151 | ~~156~~ | ~~156~~ | 4 | 286 |
| 2nd place, silver medalist(s) | Simon Brandhuber (GER) | A | | 128 | 132 | 134 | 2nd place, silver medalist(s) | 148 | 152 | ~~155~~ | 3rd place, bronze medalist(s) | 286 |
| 3rd place, bronze medalist(s) | Gabriel Marinov (BUL) | A | | 116 | 119 | 122 | 6 | 151 | ~~157~~ | 157 | 1st place, gold medalist(s) | 279 |
| 4 | Ramini Shamilishvili (GEO) | A | | 121 | ~~126~~ | 127 | 4 | 145 | 151 | ~~156~~ | 5 | 278 |
| 5 | Jon Luke Mau (GER) | A | | 118 | 121 | ~~123~~ | 7 | ~~156~~ | 156 | ~~159~~ | 2nd place, silver medalist(s) | 277 |
| 6 | Kaan Kahriman (TUR) | A | | 122 | 126 | ~~129~~ | 5 | 136 | 140 | 145 | 6 | 271 |
| 7 | Daniel Lungu (MDA) | A | | ~~121~~ | 121 | ~~125~~ | 8 | 135 | ~~140~~ | ~~140~~ | 8 | 256 |
| 8 | Mateus Caci (ALB) | A | | ~~108~~ | ~~110~~ | 111 | 9 | 132 | ~~136~~ | 137 | 7 | 248 |
| 9 | František Polák (CZE) | A | | 100 | 105 | 110 | 10 | ~~130~~ | 130 | ~~137~~ | 9 | 240 |
| — | Ferdi Hardal (TUR) | A | | 128 | 131 | ~~133~~ | 3rd place, bronze medalist(s) | ~~156~~ | ~~156~~ | ~~156~~ | — | — |

=== Men's 67 kg ===
| Rank | Athlete | Group | Body weight | Snatch (kg) | | | | Clean & Jerk (kg) | | | | Total |
| Rank | Athlete | Group | Body weight | 1 | 2 | 3 | Rank | 1 | 2 | 3 | Rank | Total |
|---|---|---|---|---|---|---|---|---|---|---|---|---|
| 1st place, gold medalist(s) | Valentin Genchev (BUL) | A | | 133 | 136 | 139 | 2nd place, silver medalist(s) | 169 | 175 | ~~180~~ | 1st place, gold medalist(s) | 314 |
| 2nd place, silver medalist(s) | Shota Mishvelidze (GEO) | A | | 135 | 139 | 142 | 1st place, gold medalist(s) | ~~164~~ | ~~165~~ | 165 | 3rd place, bronze medalist(s) | 307 |
| 3rd place, bronze medalist(s) | Acorán Hernández (ESP) | A | | 133 | 136 | 138 | 3rd place, bronze medalist(s) | ~~157~~ | 157 | 161 | 5 | 299 |
| 4 | Goga Chkheidze (GEO) | A | | 131 | 134 | 137 | 4 | 155 | 159 | ~~163~~ | 6 | 296 |
| 5 | Yusuf Fehmi Genç (TUR) | A | | 125 | ~~129~~ | ~~129~~ | 7 | 161 | 164 | 167 | 2nd place, silver medalist(s) | 292 |
| 6 | Petr Petrov (CZE) | A | | 127 | 130 | ~~135~~ | 5 | 156 | 161 | ~~166~~ | 4 | 291 |
| 7 | Kacper Urban (POL) | A | | 123 | 127 | ~~131~~ | 6 | 145 | 151 | ~~155~~ | 7 | 278 |
| 8 | Victor Moroșanu (MDA) | A | | 120 | 125 | ~~128~~ | 8 | 140 | ~~145~~ | ~~145~~ | 10 | 265 |
| 9 | Herlsjon Ismailanj (ALB) | A | | ~~118~~ | 118 | ~~122~~ | 10 | 141 | 145 | ~~148~~ | 8 | 263 |
| 10 | Marek Komorowski (POL) | A | | 117 | 120 | ~~123~~ | 9 | ~~141~~ | ~~141~~ | 141 | 9 | 261 |
| 11 | Faris Durak (BIH) | A | | ~~85~~ | 85 | ~~91~~ | 11 | 107 | 113 | ~~115~~ | 11 | 198 |

=== Men's 73 kg ===
| Rank | Athlete | Group | Body weight | Snatch (kg) | | | | Clean & Jerk (kg) | | | | Total |
| Rank | Athlete | Group | Body weight | 1 | 2 | 3 | Rank | 1 | 2 | 3 | Rank | Total |
|---|---|---|---|---|---|---|---|---|---|---|---|---|
| 1st place, gold medalist(s) | Muhammed Furkan Özbek (TUR) | A | | 145 | ~~148~~ | 149 | 3rd place, bronze medalist(s) | 178 | 181 | 190 | 1st place, gold medalist(s) | 339 |
| 2nd place, silver medalist(s) | Kakhi Asanidze (GEO) | A | | 144 | ~~150~~ | 150 | 2nd place, silver medalist(s) | 172 | 176 | ~~179~~ | 3rd place, bronze medalist(s) | 326 |
| 3rd place, bronze medalist(s) | Piotr Kudłaszyk (POL) | A | | 139 | 143 | ~~145~~ | 7 | ~~176~~ | ~~181~~ | 181 | 2nd place, silver medalist(s) | 324 |
| 4 | Mirko Zanni (ITA) | A | | 145 | ~~150~~ | ~~151~~ | 5 | ~~172~~ | ~~173~~ | 173 | 6 | 318 |
| 5 | Max Lang (GER) | A | | ~~143~~ | 143 | ~~146~~ | 8 | 175 | ~~180~~ | ~~180~~ | 4 | 318 |
| 6 | Ritvars Suharevs (LAT) | A | | 145 | ~~150~~ | ~~151~~ | 4 | 172 | ~~177~~ | ~~180~~ | 7 | 317 |
| 7 | Batuhan Yüksel (TUR) | A | | 141 | ~~144~~ | ~~146~~ | 9 | 173 | ~~178~~ | ~~178~~ | 5 | 314 |
| 8 | Sebastián Cabala (SVK) | B | | 133 | ~~136~~ | 136 | 10 | 160 | ~~167~~ | 170 | 8 | 306 |
| 9 | Jonathan Chin (GBR) | B | | 120 | 124 | ~~128~~ | 13 | 156 | ~~160~~ | 163 | 9 | 287 |
| 10 | Mikey Farmer (GBR) | B | | 128 | ~~132~~ | ~~132~~ | 12 | ~~158~~ | 158 | ~~162~~ | 10 | 286 |
| 11 | Petr Stránský (CZE) | B | | 126 | 129 | ~~132~~ | 11 | 146 | ~~150~~ | — | 12 | 275 |
| 12 | Daniel Roness (NOR) | B | | 115 | ~~119~~ | ~~122~~ | 14 | 146 | 152 | 158 | 11 | 273 |
| — | Erkand Qerimaj (ALB) | B | | ~~150~~ | ~~150~~ | 150 | 1st place, gold medalist(s) | ~~174~~ | ~~174~~ | ~~174~~ | — | — |
| — | Roberto Gutu (GER) | A | | 140 | 144 | ~~146~~ | 6 | ~~170~~ | ~~170~~ | ~~170~~ | — | — |
| — | Briken Calja (ALB) | A | | ~~151~~ | ~~151~~ | ~~151~~ | — | — | — | — | — | — |
| — | Vitalii Smochek (UKR) | B | | ~~135~~ | ~~135~~ | ~~135~~ | — | — | — | — | — | — |

=== Men's 81 kg ===
| Rank | Athlete | Group | Body weight | Snatch (kg) | | | | Clean & Jerk (kg) | | | | Total |
| Rank | Athlete | Group | Body weight | 1 | 2 | 3 | Rank | 1 | 2 | 3 | Rank | Total |
|---|---|---|---|---|---|---|---|---|---|---|---|---|
| 1st place, gold medalist(s) | Rafik Harutyunyan (ARM) | A | | ~~155~~ | 155 | 160 | 2nd place, silver medalist(s) | 187 | 194 | – | 1st place, gold medalist(s) | 354 |
| 2nd place, silver medalist(s) | Andrés Mata (ESP) | A | | ~~155~~ | 160 | ~~162~~ | 1st place, gold medalist(s) | 186 | ~~191~~ | ~~193~~ | 3rd place, bronze medalist(s) | 346 |
| 3rd place, bronze medalist(s) | Bozhidar Andreev (BUL) | A | | ~~150~~ | ~~153~~ | 153 | 3rd place, bronze medalist(s) | 185 | 190 | ~~195~~ | 2nd place, silver medalist(s) | 343 |
| 4 | Karen Margaryan (ARM) | A | | 152 | ~~156~~ | ~~156~~ | 4 | 185 | ~~190~~ | ~~192~~ | 4 | 337 |
| 5 | Petr Mareček (CZE) | A | | 142 | 147 | ~~151~~ | 5 | 173 | 178 | ~~186~~ | 5 | 325 |
| 6 | Chris Murray (GBR) | A | | 137 | 140 | 143 | 6 | 173 | 177 | ~~180~~ | 6 | 320 |
| 7 | Kristi Ramadani (ALB) | A | | 138 | ~~141~~ | ~~142~~ | 7 | 168 | ~~173~~ | ~~175~~ | 7 | 306 |
| 8 | Hmayak Misakyan (AUT) | B | | 132 | 136 | ~~140~~ | 8 | ~~157~~ | 157 | ~~162~~ | 8 | 293 |
| 9 | Goran Ćetković (CRO) | B | | 120 | 125 | 130 | 9 | 150 | 155 | ~~164~~ | 9 | 285 |
| 10 | Eoin Kealy (IRL) | B | | 119 | 122 | ~~125~~ | 11 | ~~153~~ | 153 | ~~158~~ | 10 | 275 |
| 11 | Omar Khathiri (NED) | B | | 115 | 120 | 123 | 10 | 145 | 147 | 150 | 11 | 273 |
| 12 | Drin Cakaj (KOS) | B | | ~~80~~ | 80 | 85 | 12 | 105 | ~~110~~ | 112 | 12 | 197 |
| — | Marin Robu (MDA) | A | | ~~160~~ | — | — | — | — | — | — | — | — |
| — | Daniel Godelli (ALB) | A | | ~~150~~ | ~~151~~ | ~~151~~ | — | — | — | — | — | — |

=== Men's 89 kg ===
| Rank | Athlete | Group | Body weight | Snatch (kg) | | | | Clean & Jerk (kg) | | | | Total |
| Rank | Athlete | Group | Body weight | 1 | 2 | 3 | Rank | 1 | 2 | 3 | Rank | Total |
|---|---|---|---|---|---|---|---|---|---|---|---|---|
| 1st place, gold medalist(s) | Antonino Pizzolato (ITA) | A | | ~~170~~ | 170 | 175 | 1st place, gold medalist(s) | 210 | 212 | 217 | 1st place, gold medalist(s) | 392 |
| 2nd place, silver medalist(s) | Karlos Nasar (BUL) | A | | 171 | ~~175~~ | ~~176~~ | 3rd place, bronze medalist(s) | 203 | 211 | ~~217~~ | 2nd place, silver medalist(s) | 382 |
| 3rd place, bronze medalist(s) | Revaz Davitadze (GEO) | A | | 167 | ~~171~~ | 171 | 4 | ~~198~~ | 198 | ~~202~~ | 4 | 369 |
| 4 | Cristiano Ficco (ITA) | A | | 160 | ~~168~~ | ~~168~~ | 8 | 200 | 206 | ~~210~~ | 3rd place, bronze medalist(s) | 366 |
| 5 | Andranik Karapetyan (ARM) | A | | 168 | 174 | ~~178~~ | 2nd place, silver medalist(s) | 191 | ~~196~~ | ~~196~~ | 5 | 365 |
| 6 | Ruslan Kozhakin (UKR) | A | | 155 | 159 | 162 | 5 | 185 | ~~190~~ | 191 | 7 | 353 |
| 7 | Artūrs Vasiļonoks (LAT) | A | | 149 | 154 | 157 | 10 | 183 | ~~190~~ | 191 | 6 | 348 |
| 8 | Theodoros Iakovidis (GRE) | A | | 150 | 154 | 158 | 9 | ~~180~~ | 180 | 188 | 8 | 346 |
| 9 | Raphael Friedrich (GER) | B | | 153 | 157 | 160 | 6 | 180 | ~~185~~ | 185 | 10 | 345 |
| 10 | Patryk Bęben (POL) | B | | 146 | 150 | 152 | 12 | 180 | 186 | ~~190~~ | 9 | 336 |
| 11 | Omed Alam (DEN) | B | | ~~147~~ | 147 | 151 | 11 | 180 | ~~184~~ | ~~185~~ | 11 | 331 |
| 12 | Irmantas Kačinskas (LTU) | B | | 141 | 146 | ~~150~~ | 14 | 170 | 177 | ~~185~~ | 12 | 323 |
| 13 | Martín Liste (ESP) | B | | ~~147~~ | ~~147~~ | 147 | 13 | ~~175~~ | ~~175~~ | 175 | 14 | 322 |
| 14 | Leho Pent (EST) | B | | ~~145~~ | ~~145~~ | 145 | 15 | 166 | 175 | ~~180~~ | 13 | 320 |
| 15 | Peter Polaček (SVK) | B | | 135 | 140 | ~~142~~ | 16 | 169 | 174 | ~~177~~ | 14 | 314 |
| 16 | Seán Brown (IRL) | B | | ~~140~~ | 140 | ~~144~~ | 17 | 168 | 172 | ~~175~~ | 16 | 312 |
| — | Vardan Manukyan (ARM) | A | | 160 | ~~165~~ | ~~165~~ | 7 | ~~200~~ | ~~200~~ | ~~200~~ | — | — |

=== Men's 96 kg ===
| Rank | Athlete | Group | Body weight | Snatch (kg) | | | | Clean & Jerk (kg) | | | | Total |
| Rank | Athlete | Group | Body weight | 1 | 2 | 3 | Rank | 1 | 2 | 3 | Rank | Total |
|---|---|---|---|---|---|---|---|---|---|---|---|---|
| 1st place, gold medalist(s) | Davit Hovhannisyan (ARM) | A | | 167 | 171 | ~~173~~ | 1st place, gold medalist(s) | ~~202~~ | 203 | 206 | 3rd place, bronze medalist(s) | 377 |
| 2nd place, silver medalist(s) | Ara Aghanyan (ARM) | A | | 160 | 165 | 170 | 2nd place, silver medalist(s) | 200 | 205 | ~~208~~ | 4 | 375 |
| 3rd place, bronze medalist(s) | Romain Imadouchène (FRA) | A | | 150 | 160 | ~~165~~ | 7 | ~~205~~ | 206 | 210 | 1st place, gold medalist(s) | 370 |
| 4 | Maksym Dombrovskyi (UKR) | A | | 157 | 162 | ~~165~~ | 6 | 195 | 200 | 207 | 2nd place, silver medalist(s) | 369 |
| 5 | Tudor Bratu (MDA) | A | | 160 | 165 | ~~167~~ | 3rd place, bronze medalist(s) | 196 | ~~201~~ | ~~203~~ | 6 | 361 |
| 6 | Bartłomiej Adamus (POL) | A | | 160 | 163 | ~~166~~ | 4 | ~~197~~ | 197 | ~~202~~ | 5 | 360 |
| 7 | Irakli Gobejishvili (GEO) | A | | 157 | 162 | ~~166~~ | 5 | ~~186~~ | 186 | ~~196~~ | 11 | 348 |
| 8 | Armands Mežinskis (LAT) | A | | 151 | ~~156~~ | ~~156~~ | 9 | 190 | ~~193~~ | 195 | 7 | 346 |
| 9 | Cyrille Tchatchet (GBR) | A | | 148 | 152 | ~~156~~ | 8 | 185 | ~~190~~ | 190 | 8 | 342 |
| 10 | Jakub Michalski (POL) | A | | ~~143~~ | ~~143~~ | 143 | 13 | ~~182~~ | 182 | 187 | 9 | 330 |
| 11 | Karol Samko (SVK) | B | | 134 | 137 | ~~140~~ | 17 | ~~185~~ | 186 | ~~191~~ | 10 | 323 |
| 12 | Yannick Tschan (SUI) | B | | 141 | 144 | ~~147~~ | 12 | ~~178~~ | 178 | ~~185~~ | 13 | 322 |
| 13 | Tomas Ličinchai (LTU) | B | | ~~141~~ | ~~141~~ | 141 | 14 | 170 | 175 | 178 | 14 | 319 |
| 14 | Simon Darville (DEN) | B | | 135 | 140 | 145 | 11 | 173 | ~~178~~ | ~~179~~ | 15 | 318 |
| 15 | Martin Štreichl (CZE) | B | | 134 | 138 | ~~142~~ | 15 | ~~174~~ | 174 | 179 | 12 | 317 |
| 16 | Ermand Tabaku (ALB) | B | | ~~145~~ | 145 | ~~148~~ | 10 | 170 | ~~175~~ | ~~177~~ | 17 | 315 |
| 17 | Viktor Ostrovský (SVK) | B | | 133 | 137 | ~~140~~ | 16 | 167 | 172 | ~~176~~ | 16 | 309 |
| 18 | Bleron Latifi (KOS) | B | | ~~90~~ | 90 | ~~95~~ | 18 | 105 | ~~110~~ | 110 | 18 | 200 |
| — | Anton Serdiukov (UKR) | A | | — | — | — | — | — | — | — | — | — |

=== Men's 102 kg ===
| Rank | Athlete | Group | Body weight | Snatch (kg) | | | | Clean & Jerk (kg) | | | | Total |
| Rank | Athlete | Group | Body weight | 1 | 2 | 3 | Rank | 1 | 2 | 3 | Rank | Total |
|---|---|---|---|---|---|---|---|---|---|---|---|---|
| 1st place, gold medalist(s) | David Fischerov (BUL) | A | | 170 | 175 | 177 | 1st place, gold medalist(s) | 209 | 212 | 215 | 1st place, gold medalist(s) | 392 |
| 2nd place, silver medalist(s) | Samvel Gasparyan (ARM) | A | | 172 | ~~176~~ | 176 | 3rd place, bronze medalist(s) | 208 | 211 | 214 | 2nd place, silver medalist(s) | 390 |
| 3rd place, bronze medalist(s) | Marcos Ruiz (ESP) | A | | 168 | 173 | 176 | 2nd place, silver medalist(s) | 203 | 208 | ~~212~~ | 3rd place, bronze medalist(s) | 384 |
| 4 | Irakli Chkheidze (GEO) | A | | 163 | 168 | 171 | 6 | 202 | ~~209~~ | ~~210~~ | 5 | 373 |
| 5 | Vasil Marinov (BUL) | A | | ~~167~~ | 167 | 172 | 5 | 200 | ~~208~~ | ~~210~~ | 7 | 372 |
| 6 | Artūrs Plēsnieks (LAT) | A | | ~~163~~ | ~~163~~ | 163 | 7 | ~~203~~ | ~~203~~ | 203 | 4 | 366 |
| 7 | Artur Mugurdumov (ISR) | B | | 153 | 157 | 160 | 10 | 192 | 197 | 200 | 6 | 360 |
| 8 | Yevhenii Yantsevich (UKR) | B | | 158 | ~~162~~ | 162 | 8 | 186 | 191 | ~~195~~ | 11 | 353 |
| 9 | Tudor Ciobanu (MDA) | A | | 155 | ~~160~~ | 160 | 11 | 192 | ~~197~~ | ~~197~~ | 10 | 352 |
| 10 | Paweł Szmeja (POL) | A | | ~~161~~ | 161 | ~~166~~ | 9 | 190 | ~~195~~ | ~~197~~ | 12 | 351 |
| 11 | Ilia Moskalenko (UKR) | B | | 150 | 155 | ~~160~~ | 12 | 195 | ~~200~~ | ~~206~~ | 8 | 350 |
| 12 | Roni Peltonen (FIN) | B | | 140 | ~~144~~ | ~~144~~ | 13 | ~~180~~ | 180 | ~~190~~ | 13 | 320 |
| 13 | Jacob Diakovasilis (DEN) | B | | ~~135~~ | 135 | 140 | 14 | 170 | 176 | ~~182~~ | 14 | 316 |
| — | Stefan Ågren (SWE) | B | | ~~152~~ | ~~152~~ | ~~152~~ | — | 181 | ~~191~~ | 192 | 9 | — |
| — | Dadash Dadashbayli (AZE) | A | | 172 | ~~176~~ | ~~178~~ | 4 | — | — | — | — | — |

=== Men's 109 kg ===
| Rank | Athlete | Group | Body weight | Snatch (kg) | | | | Clean & Jerk (kg) | | | | Total |
| Rank | Athlete | Group | Body weight | 1 | 2 | 3 | Rank | 1 | 2 | 3 | Rank | Total |
|---|---|---|---|---|---|---|---|---|---|---|---|---|
| 1st place, gold medalist(s) | Hristo Hristov (BUL) | A | | 175 | 180 | ~~182~~ | 1st place, gold medalist(s) | ~~206~~ | 206 | 211 | 1st place, gold medalist(s) | 391 |
| 2nd place, silver medalist(s) | Giorgi Chkheidze (GEO) | A | | 167 | 171 | 174 | 2nd place, silver medalist(s) | 205 | 210 | ~~218~~ | 2nd place, silver medalist(s) | 384 |
| 3rd place, bronze medalist(s) | Arsen Martirosyan (ARM) | A | | ~~170~~ | 170 | ~~174~~ | 4 | 201 | ~~210~~ | – | 4 | 371 |
| 4 | Onur Demirci (TUR) | A | | 156 | ~~161~~ | ~~161~~ | 8 | 195 | 202 | ~~206~~ | 3rd place, bronze medalist(s) | 358 |
| 5 | Sargis Martirosjan (AUT) | A | | ~~167~~ | 167 | 172 | 3rd place, bronze medalist(s) | ~~179~~ | 179 | 185 | 8 | 357 |
| 6 | Arnas Šidiškis (LTU) | B | | 150 | 155 | 160 | 6 | 185 | ~~190~~ | 190 | 6 | 350 |
| 7 | Hannes Keskitalo (FIN) | A | | 145 | 150 | ~~155~~ | 12 | 200 | ~~206~~ | ~~207~~ | 5 | 350 |
| 8 | Josef Kolář (CZE) | B | | 148 | 152 | ~~156~~ | 10 | 180 | ~~186~~ | 186 | 7 | 338 |
| 9 | Albert Meta (ALB) | B | | 148 | ~~152~~ | 153 | 9 | 172 | 176 | 180 | 10 | 333 |
| 10 | Radoslav Tatarčík (SVK) | A | | 161 | ~~164~~ | ~~165~~ | 5 | 170 | ~~174~~ | ~~174~~ | 12 | 331 |
| 11 | Andrew Griffiths (GBR) | A | | 152 | ~~156~~ | ~~156~~ | 11 | ~~177~~ | ~~177~~ | 177 | 11 | 329 |
| 12 | Arnošt Vogel (CZE) | B | | 137 | 142 | 146 | 14 | 173 | ~~180~~ | 181 | 9 | 327 |
| 13 | Ardit Onuzi (ALB) | B | | 150 | 156 | ~~160~~ | 7 | ~~165~~ | 165 | ~~171~~ | 13 | 321 |
| 14 | Mak Numić (BIH) | B | | ~~110~~ | 110 | 120 | 15 | 140 | 150 | ~~155~~ | 14 | 270 |
| — | Jan Marek Trebichavský (SVK) | B | | ~~145~~ | 146 | 149 | 13 | ~~173~~ | ~~173~~ | ~~173~~ | — | — |

=== Men's +109 kg ===
| Rank | Athlete | Group | Body weight | Snatch (kg) | | | | Clean & Jerk (kg) | | | | Total |
| Rank | Athlete | Group | Body weight | 1 | 2 | 3 | Rank | 1 | 2 | 3 | Rank | Total |
|---|---|---|---|---|---|---|---|---|---|---|---|---|
| 1st place, gold medalist(s) | Lasha Talakhadze (GEO) | A | | 208 | 212 | 217 | 1st place, gold medalist(s) | 245 | ~~253~~ | — | 1st place, gold medalist(s) | 462 |
| 2nd place, silver medalist(s) | Varazdat Lalayan (ARM) | A | | 203 | ~~211~~ | 211 | 2nd place, silver medalist(s) | 240 | ~~252~~ | ~~252~~ | 2nd place, silver medalist(s) | 451 |
| 3rd place, bronze medalist(s) | Gor Minasyan (ARM) | A | | 202 | ~~210~~ | 210 | 3rd place, bronze medalist(s) | 236 | ~~245~~ | ~~245~~ | 4 | 446 |
| 4 | Kamil Kučera (CZE) | A | | 176 | 180 | 184 | 5 | 225 | 231 | ~~237~~ | 5 | 415 |
| 5 | Jiří Orság (CZE) | A | | 169 | 172 | ~~176~~ | 9 | 225 | ~~235~~ | 237 | 3rd place, bronze medalist(s) | 409 |
| 6 | David Litvinov (ISR) | A | | 178 | 182 | 186 | 4 | 207 | 215 | 220 | 7 | 406 |
| 7 | Tamaš Kajdoči (SRB) | A | | 170 | 177 | ~~183~~ | 7 | 217 | ~~226~~ | 226 | 6 | 403 |
| 8 | Péter Nagy (HUN) | A | | 165 | ~~172~~ | ~~172~~ | 11 | 205 | ~~211~~ | 211 | 8 | 376 |
| 9 | Oleh Hanzenko (UKR) | A | | ~~175~~ | 175 | ~~180~~ | 8 | 200 | ~~210~~ | — | 9 | 375 |
| 10 | Gordon Shaw (GBR) | B | | 157 | 163 | 169 | 10 | ~~188~~ | 188 | 196 | 10 | 365 |
| 11 | Kim Eirik Tollefsen (NOR) | B | | 155 | 160 | ~~164~~ | 12 | 195 | ~~200~~ | ~~200~~ | 11 | 355 |
| 12 | Mackenzie Middleton (GBR) | B | | 150 | ~~155~~ | 157 | 13 | 185 | ~~193~~ | ~~195~~ | 13 | 342 |
| 13 | Križan Rajić (CRO) | B | | ~~140~~ | ~~140~~ | 140 | 14 | 165 | ~~175~~ | ~~175~~ | 14 | 305 |
| — | Hampus Lithén (SWE) | B | | ~~150~~ | ~~150~~ | ~~150~~ | — | 190 | ~~200~~ | ~~207~~ | 12 | — |
| — | Enzo Kuworge (NED) | A | | 178 | ~~181~~ | 183 | 6 | ~~230~~ | ~~230~~ | ~~230~~ | — | — |

== Women's results ==
=== Women's 45 kg ===
| Rank | Athlete | Group | Body weight | Snatch (kg) | | | | Clean & Jerk (kg) | | | | Total |
| Rank | Athlete | Group | Body weight | 1 | 2 | 3 | Rank | 1 | 2 | 3 | Rank | Total |
|---|---|---|---|---|---|---|---|---|---|---|---|---|
| 1st place, gold medalist(s) | Şaziye Erdoğan (TUR) | A | | 71 | 73 | ~~75~~ | 1st place, gold medalist(s) | 88 | 90 | — | 1st place, gold medalist(s) | 163 |
| 2nd place, silver medalist(s) | Cansu Bektaş (TUR) | A | | ~~65~~ | 65 | 68 | 4 | 83 | ~~85~~ | 85 | 2nd place, silver medalist(s) | 153 |
| 3rd place, bronze medalist(s) | Radmila Zagorac (SRB) | A | | 66 | 68 | ~~70~~ | 3rd place, bronze medalist(s) | ~~80~~ | 82 | 84 | 3rd place, bronze medalist(s) | 152 |
| 4 | Teodora-Luminița Hîncu (MDA) | A | | 65 | 68 | ~~70~~ | 2nd place, silver medalist(s) | ~~80~~ | 81 | 83 | 4 | 151 |
| 5 | Ecaterina Grabucea (MDA) | A | | 60 | 63 | ~~65~~ | 5 | 80 | 82 | ~~84~~ | 5 | 145 |
| 6 | Sonja Koponen (FIN) | A | | ~~61~~ | 61 | ~~64~~ | 6 | 73 | ~~76~~ | 77 | 6 | 138 |
| 7 | Nejla Kalača (BIH) | A | | 40 | 42 | 44 | 7 | ~~51~~ | ~~51~~ | 51 | 7 | 98 |

=== Women's 49 kg ===
| Rank | Athlete | Group | Body weight | Snatch (kg) | | | | Clean & Jerk (kg) | | | | Total |
| Rank | Athlete | Group | Body weight | 1 | 2 | 3 | Rank | 1 | 2 | 3 | Rank | Total |
|---|---|---|---|---|---|---|---|---|---|---|---|---|
| 1st place, gold medalist(s) | Giulia Imperio (ITA) | A | | ~~79~~ | 79 | ~~81~~ | 2nd place, silver medalist(s) | 92 | ~~100~~ | ~~104~~ | 1st place, gold medalist(s) | 171 |
| 2nd place, silver medalist(s) | Anhelina Lomachynska (UKR) | A | | 75 | 77 | 80 | 1st place, gold medalist(s) | ~~87~~ | 87 | ~~89~~ | 3rd place, bronze medalist(s) | 167 |
| 3rd place, bronze medalist(s) | María Giménez-Guervós (ESP) | A | | ~~72~~ | 72 | ~~74~~ | 3rd place, bronze medalist(s) | 86 | 88 | 91 | 2nd place, silver medalist(s) | 163 |
| 4 | Olga Shapiro (ISR) | A | | 67 | 70 | ~~73~~ | 4 | 80 | ~~83~~ | 83 | 5 | 153 |
| 5 | Rebecca Copeland (IRL) | A | | 63 | ~~65~~ | 65 | 5 | 72 | 75 | 78 | 7 | 143 |
| 6 | Mara Strzykala (LUX) | A | | 62 | ~~64~~ | ~~64~~ | 6 | ~~81~~ | 81 | ~~83~~ | 6 | 143 |
| 7 | Tihana Majer (CRO) | A | | 53 | 57 | 61 | 8 | 73 | ~~77~~ | 77 | 8 | 138 |
| — | Concordia Butnari (MDA) | A | | 58 | 61 | ~~63~~ | 7 | ~~73~~ | ~~73~~ | ~~73~~ | — | — |
| — | Nadezhda Nguen (BUL) | A | | ~~66~~ | ~~66~~ | ~~66~~ | — | 80 | 83 | 85 | 4 | — |

=== Women's 55 kg ===
| Rank | Athlete | Group | Body weight | Snatch (kg) | | | | Clean & Jerk (kg) | | | | Total |
| Rank | Athlete | Group | Body weight | 1 | 2 | 3 | Rank | 1 | 2 | 3 | Rank | Total |
|---|---|---|---|---|---|---|---|---|---|---|---|---|
| 1st place, gold medalist(s) | Evagjelia Veli (ALB) | A | | 90 | 93 | 95 | 1st place, gold medalist(s) | 108 | 111 | 113 | 2nd place, silver medalist(s) | 208 |
| 2nd place, silver medalist(s) | Kamila Konotop (UKR) | A | | ~~90~~ | 90 | 94 | 2nd place, silver medalist(s) | 107 | 110 | 113 | 1st place, gold medalist(s) | 207 |
| 3rd place, bronze medalist(s) | Nina Sterckx (BEL) | A | | 90 | ~~93~~ | 94 | 3rd place, bronze medalist(s) | ~~109~~ | ~~109~~ | 111 | 3rd place, bronze medalist(s) | 205 |
| 4 | Svitlana Samuliak (UKR) | A | | 85 | 88 | 91 | 4 | 102 | 105 | 107 | 5 | 198 |
| 5 | Izabella Yaylyan (ARM) | A | | ~~87~~ | 87 | 90 | 5 | 107 | ~~112~~ | ~~116~~ | 4 | 197 |
| 6 | Atenery Hernández (ESP) | A | | 84 | ~~86~~ | 86 | 6 | 103 | ~~105~~ | ~~106~~ | 9 | 189 |
| 7 | Sarah Øvsthus (NOR) | A | | 83 | ~~85~~ | ~~85~~ | 8 | 102 | 105 | ~~107~~ | 7 | 188 |
| 8 | Scheila Meister (SUI) | A | | 81 | ~~84~~ | ~~84~~ | 9 | 101 | 104 | ~~106~~ | 8 | 185 |
| 9 | Duygu Alıcı (TUR) | A | | ~~80~~ | 80 | ~~84~~ | 10 | 105 | ~~108~~ | ~~109~~ | 6 | 185 |
| 10 | Katrine Bruhn (DEN) | A | | 77 | 81 | 84 | 7 | 100 | ~~105~~ | ~~105~~ | 10 | 184 |
| 11 | Rebekka Jacobsen (NOR) | A | | 76 | 76 | 77 | 11 | 96 | 99 | ~~101~~ | 11 | 176 |
| 12 | Marlous Schuilwerve (NED) | A | | 70 | 75 | ~~77~~ | 12 | 88 | 91 | ~~93~~ | 14 | 166 |
| 13 | Roni Shaham (ISR) | B | | 69 | ~~72~~ | 72 | 14 | 87 | 90 | 92 | 12 | 164 |
| 14 | Noorin Gulam (GBR) | B | | ~~67~~ | 67 | 70 | 15 | 87 | ~~90~~ | 91 | 15 | 161 |
| 15 | Nastasja Štesl (SLO) | B | | 72 | ~~75~~ | ~~75~~ | 13 | 86 | 88 | ~~90~~ | 16 | 160 |
| 16 | Veronika Hándlová (CZE) | B | | ~~64~~ | ~~64~~ | 64 | 16 | 78 | 81 | ~~83~~ | 17 | 145 |
| 17 | Julia Ali Hasani (ALB) | B | | ~~61~~ | 61 | ~~64~~ | 17 | 71 | 75 | ~~77~~ | 18 | 136 |
| — | Laura Liukkonen (FIN) | B | | ~~74~~ | ~~74~~ | ~~74~~ | — | 91 | ~~94~~ | — | 13 | — |

=== Women's 59 kg ===
| Rank | Athlete | Group | Body weight | Snatch (kg) | | | | Clean & Jerk (kg) | | | | Total |
| Rank | Athlete | Group | Body weight | 1 | 2 | 3 | Rank | 1 | 2 | 3 | Rank | Total |
|---|---|---|---|---|---|---|---|---|---|---|---|---|
| 1st place, gold medalist(s) | Dora Tchakounté (FRA) | A | | 93 | 96 | ~~98~~ | 2nd place, silver medalist(s) | 113 | ~~117~~ | 117 | 2nd place, silver medalist(s) | 213 |
| 2nd place, silver medalist(s) | Lucrezia Magistris (ITA) | A | | 93 | 96 | 98 | 1st place, gold medalist(s) | 110 | ~~113~~ | 114 | 3rd place, bronze medalist(s) | 212 |
| 3rd place, bronze medalist(s) | Ine Andersson (NOR) | A | | 88 | 90 | ~~92~~ | 4 | 115 | 118 | ~~120~~ | 1st place, gold medalist(s) | 208 |
| 4 | Sofia Georgopoulou (GRE) | A | | 91 | ~~94~~ | 94 | 3rd place, bronze medalist(s) | 110 | ~~114~~ | ~~115~~ | 7 | 204 |
| 5 | Fraer Morrow (GBR) | A | | 87 | ~~90~~ | ~~90~~ | 9 | 109 | ~~112~~ | 113 | 4 | 200 |
| 6 | Garance Rigaud (FRA) | A | | 85 | ~~89~~ | 89 | 5 | 104 | ~~108~~ | 110 | 8 | 199 |
| 7 | Jessica Gordon Brown (GBR) | A | | 87 | ~~90~~ | ~~90~~ | 8 | 107 | ~~110~~ | ~~110~~ | 10 | 194 |
| 8 | Monika Szymanek (POL) | B | | 79 | 82 | ~~84~~ | 13 | 105 | 110 | ~~114~~ | 5 | 192 |
| 9 | Mouna Skandi (ESP) | B | | 82 | ~~85~~ | ~~86~~ | 12 | 105 | ~~110~~ | 110 | 6 | 192 |
| 10 | Sol Anette Waaler (NOR) | B | | 84 | ~~86~~ | ~~86~~ | 10 | 102 | 105 | 107 | 9 | 191 |
| 11 | Maria Kardara (GRE) | B | | ~~88~~ | ~~88~~ | 88 | 7 | 95 | 100 | ~~103~~ | 13 | 188 |
| 12 | Hannah Crymble (IRL) | B | | 81 | ~~83~~ | 83 | 11 | 98 | 101 | ~~104~~ | 12 | 184 |
| 13 | Amalie Løvind Årsten (DEN) | B | | 78 | ~~82~~ | ~~83~~ | 14 | 98 | ~~102~~ | 103 | 11 | 181 |
| 14 | Belinda Bekker (NED) | B | | 71 | 74 | ~~76~~ | 16 | 89 | 93 | ~~97~~ | 15 | 167 |
| 15 | Eliška Malcharcziková (CZE) | B | | 72 | 75 | ~~77~~ | 15 | 87 | ~~90~~ | ~~90~~ | 16 | 162 |
| 16 | Ivana Gorišek (CRO) | B | | ~~71~~ | ~~73~~ | 73 | 17 | 85 | ~~88~~ | ~~88~~ | 17 | 158 |
| — | Irene Martínez (ESP) | B | | 88 | ~~91~~ | ~~91~~ | 6 | ~~97~~ | ~~97~~ | ~~97~~ | — | — |
| — | Nathalie Lebbe (BEL) | B | | ~~77~~ | ~~77~~ | ~~77~~ | — | ~~93~~ | ~~96~~ | 96 | 14 | — |
| — | Saara Retulainen (FIN) | A | | ~~92~~ | ~~92~~ | ~~92~~ | — | — | — | — | — | — |
| — | Alessia Durante (ITA) | A | | ~~90~~ | ~~90~~ | ~~90~~ | — | ~~110~~ | — | — | — | — |

=== Women's 64 kg ===
| Rank | Athlete | Group | Body weight | Snatch (kg) | | | | Clean & Jerk (kg) | | | | Total |
| Rank | Athlete | Group | Body weight | 1 | 2 | 3 | Rank | 1 | 2 | 3 | Rank | Total |
|---|---|---|---|---|---|---|---|---|---|---|---|---|
| 1st place, gold medalist(s) | Mariia Hanhur (UKR) | A | | 96 | 100 | 102 | 1st place, gold medalist(s) | 113 | 118 | 120 | 3rd place, bronze medalist(s) | 222 |
| 2nd place, silver medalist(s) | Nuray Güngör (TUR) | A | | 95 | ~~99~~ | 99 | 2nd place, silver medalist(s) | 117 | 120 | ~~124~~ | 1st place, gold medalist(s) | 219 |
| 3rd place, bronze medalist(s) | Vicky Graillot (FRA) | A | | 89 | ~~92~~ | ~~92~~ | 9 | 114 | ~~119~~ | 119 | 4 | 208 |
| 4 | Daniela Gherman (SWE) | A | | ~~93~~ | 93 | 96 | 3rd place, bronze medalist(s) | ~~111~~ | 111 | ~~113~~ | 7 | 207 |
| 5 | Berfin Altun (TUR) | A | | ~~83~~ | 83 | 86 | 12 | 117 | 120 | ~~123~~ | 2nd place, silver medalist(s) | 206 |
| 6 | Aino Luostarinen (FIN) | A | | 88 | ~~90~~ | 91 | 6 | 110 | 113 | ~~118~~ | 5 | 204 |
| 7 | Marit Årdalsbakke (NOR) | A | | 90 | 93 | ~~95~~ | 4 | 106 | ~~109~~ | 109 | 9 | 202 |
| 8 | Ana De Gregorio (ESP) | A | | ~~90~~ | 90 | ~~95~~ | 7 | 104 | 108 | ~~112~~ | 10 | 198 |
| 9 | Emilia Rechul (POL) | A | | 81 | 84 | 86 | 11 | 106 | ~~110~~ | 110 | 8 | 196 |
| 10 | Garoa Martínez (ESP) | A | | 83 | 88 | 90 | 8 | ~~105~~ | 105 | ~~109~~ | 14 | 195 |
| 11 | Katla Björk Ketilsdóttir (ISL) | A | | 82 | 86 | 88 | 10 | 101 | 104 | 106 | 11 | 194 |
| 12 | Beáta Jung (HUN) | A | | 89 | 92 | ~~95~~ | 5 | 102 | ~~107~~ | ~~107~~ | 18 | 194 |
| 13 | Eleni Revenikioti (GRE) | A | | 82 | ~~85~~ | ~~85~~ | 19 | 108 | ~~112~~ | 112 | 6 | 194 |
| 14 | Jennifer Tong (GBR) | B | | 82 | 85 | ~~87~~ | 15 | 100 | 104 | ~~106~~ | 16 | 189 |
| 15 | Mariia Tymoshchuk (UKR) | A | | 83 | ~~86~~ | ~~87~~ | 17 | 102 | 106 | ~~109~~ | 12 | 189 |
| 16 | Helena Rønnebæk (DEN) | C | | ~~81~~ | 81 | ~~84~~ | 20 | 102 | ~~104~~ | 105 | 13 | 186 |
| 17 | Yasmin Zammit Stevens (MLT) | C | | 82 | ~~85~~ | 85 | 14 | ~~100~~ | 100 | ~~103~~ | 20 | 185 |
| 18 | Myrthe Timmermans (NED) | C | | ~~81~~ | 81 | ~~84~~ | 21 | 100 | ~~104~~ | 104 | 15 | 185 |
| 19 | Lucia Kršková (SVK) | C | | 79 | 82 | 85 | 13 | 96 | 99 | ~~102~~ | 22 | 184 |
| 20 | Jannike Backstrom (FIN) | B | | 80 | 83 | ~~85~~ | 16 | ~~100~~ | 100 | ~~104~~ | 21 | 183 |
| 21 | Nienke van Overveld (NED) | C | | 75 | 78 | ~~82~~ | 24 | ~~103~~ | 103 | ~~107~~ | 17 | 181 |
| 22 | Julia Jordanger Loen (NOR) | B | | ~~82~~ | 82 | ~~84~~ | 18 | ~~97~~ | 97 | ~~101~~ | 24 | 179 |
| 23 | Gillian Barry (IRL) | C | | ~~77~~ | ~~77~~ | 77 | 25 | 98 | 101 | ~~103~~ | 19 | 178 |
| 24 | Natália Hušťavová (SVK) | C | | 78 | ~~81~~ | ~~81~~ | 23 | 96 | 99 | ~~102~~ | 23 | 177 |
| — | Amanda Poulsen (DEN) | B | | ~~80~~ | ~~80~~ | 81 | 22 | — | — | — | — | — |

=== Women's 71 kg ===
| Rank | Athlete | Group | Body weight | Snatch (kg) | | | | Clean & Jerk (kg) | | | | Total |
| Rank | Athlete | Group | Body weight | 1 | 2 | 3 | Rank | 1 | 2 | 3 | Rank | Total |
|---|---|---|---|---|---|---|---|---|---|---|---|---|
| 1st place, gold medalist(s) | Patricia Strenius (SWE) | A | | ~~91~~ | 91 | 94 | 6 | 120 | 122 | 130 | 1st place, gold medalist(s) | 224 |
| 2nd place, silver medalist(s) | Lisa Schweizer (GER) | A | | 97 | 101 | 103 | 1st place, gold medalist(s) | 113 | 117 | 120 | 3rd place, bronze medalist(s) | 223 |
| 3rd place, bronze medalist(s) | Monika Marach (POL) | A | | 94 | 96 | 99 | 2nd place, silver medalist(s) | 113 | 116 | ~~118~~ | 6 | 215 |
| 4 | Aysel Özkan (TUR) | A | | 95 | 98 | ~~102~~ | 3rd place, bronze medalist(s) | 115 | ~~118~~ | ~~118~~ | 7 | 213 |
| 5 | Gintarė Bražaitė (LTU) | A | | 92 | ~~95~~ | 96 | 4 | 113 | 117 | ~~120~~ | 4 | 213 |
| 6 | Line Gude (DEN) | A | | ~~89~~ | 90 | ~~93~~ | 9 | 114 | ~~117~~ | 121 | 2nd place, silver medalist(s) | 211 |
| 7 | Manon Angonese (BEL) | A | | 90 | 93 | 95 | 5 | 112 | ~~115~~ | ~~115~~ | 10 | 207 |
| 8 | Lijana Jakaitė (LTU) | A | | 92 | ~~94~~ | 94 | 7 | 113 | ~~116~~ | ~~116~~ | 9 | 207 |
| 9 | Eygló Fanndal Sturludóttir (ISL) | B | | ~~89~~ | 89 | ~~94~~ | 10 | 112 | 116 | ~~120~~ | 5 | 205 |
| 10 | Nina Rondziková (SVK) | B | | ~~86~~ | 86 | ~~88~~ | 11 | 105 | 108 | ~~112~~ | 11 | 196 |
| 11 | Janette Ylisoini (FIN) | A | | ~~86~~ | ~~86~~ | 86 | 12 | 107 | ~~111~~ | ~~112~~ | 12 | 193 |
| 12 | Victoria Hahn (AUT) | B | | 85 | 88 | 90 | 8 | ~~102~~ | 102 | ~~105~~ | 15 | 192 |
| 13 | Ivana Horná (SVK) | B | | ~~82~~ | 83 | ~~87~~ | 14 | 103 | ~~107~~ | ~~109~~ | 14 | 186 |
| 14 | Linda Keesman (NED) | B | | ~~78~~ | 78 | 81 | 15 | 100 | 105 | ~~110~~ | 13 | 186 |
| 15 | Mette Pedersen (DEN) | B | | 80 | 82 | 84 | 13 | 99 | ~~102~~ | ~~102~~ | 16 | 183 |
| 16 | Tia Sarah Tovarlaža (CRO) | B | | ~~70~~ | 70 | 74 | 17 | 93 | ~~97~~ | 97 | 17 | 171 |
| 17 | Rebecca Oudheusden (NED) | B | | ~~75~~ | ~~75~~ | 75 | 16 | ~~88~~ | 88 | 95 | 18 | 170 |
| — | Erin Barton (GBR) | A | | ~~86~~ | ~~86~~ | ~~86~~ | — | 114 | ~~118~~ | ~~118~~ | 8 | — |

=== Women's 76 kg ===
| Rank | Athlete | Group | Body weight | Snatch (kg) | | | | Clean & Jerk (kg) | | | | Total |
| Rank | Athlete | Group | Body weight | 1 | 2 | 3 | Rank | 1 | 2 | 3 | Rank | Total |
|---|---|---|---|---|---|---|---|---|---|---|---|---|
| 1st place, gold medalist(s) | Marie Fegue (FRA) | A | | 105 | 110 | ~~113~~ | 1st place, gold medalist(s) | 126 | 130 | 135 | 1st place, gold medalist(s) | 245 |
| 2nd place, silver medalist(s) | Daniela Ivanova (LAT) | A | | 91 | 94 | 96 | 6 | 121 | 126 | ~~128~~ | 2nd place, silver medalist(s) | 222 |
| 3rd place, bronze medalist(s) | Dilara Uçan (TUR) | A | | 93 | 96 | 99 | 4 | 121 | ~~125~~ | ~~125~~ | 3rd place, bronze medalist(s) | 220 |
| 4 | Maria Kireva (BUL) | A | | 100 | 102 | 104 | 2nd place, silver medalist(s) | 115 | ~~117~~ | ~~118~~ | 8 | 219 |
| 5 | Nicole Rubanovich (ISR) | A | | 95 | 98 | ~~101~~ | 5 | ~~113~~ | 113 | 116 | 6 | 214 |
| 6 | Ilia Hernández (ESP) | A | | ~~92~~ | 92 | ~~96~~ | 10 | 120 | ~~126~~ | ~~127~~ | 4 | 212 |
| 7 | Natalia Prișcepa (MDA) | B | | 92 | ~~95~~ | 95 | 7 | 111 | ~~115~~ | 115 | 7 | 210 |
| 8 | Nikki Löwik (NED) | B | | 90 | 94 | ~~96~~ | 8 | 110 | 113 | ~~117~~ | 9 | 207 |
| 9 | Veronika Mitykó (HUN) | A | | 94 | ~~98~~ | ~~99~~ | 9 | 104 | 108 | 111 | 12 | 205 |
| 10 | Jutta Selin (FIN) | B | | ~~87~~ | ~~87~~ | 87 | 13 | 110 | 114 | 117 | 5 | 204 |
| 11 | Katrina Feklistova (GBR) | A | | 87 | 90 | ~~94~~ | 11 | ~~112~~ | 112 | ~~115~~ | 10 | 202 |
| 12 | Ecaterina Cîlcic (MDA) | B | | 85 | ~~89~~ | ~~91~~ | 14 | 107 | 111 | ~~113~~ | 11 | 196 |
| 13 | Maya Nielsen (DEN) | B | | ~~84~~ | 84 | 87 | 12 | 100 | 104 | ~~106~~ | 13 | 191 |
| 14 | Iris Dossche (BEL) | B | | 80 | 82 | ~~85~~ | 15 | 95 | 97 | 101 | 14 | 183 |
| 15 | Arjeta Rade (ALB) | B | | ~~75~~ | 75 | 80 | 16 | 90 | 95 | ~~100~~ | 15 | 175 |
| — | Tatev Hakobyan (ARM) | A | | 101 | ~~104~~ | 104 | 3rd place, bronze medalist(s) | ~~119~~ | ~~120~~ | ~~120~~ | — | — |

=== Women's 81 kg ===
| Rank | Athlete | Group | Body weight | Snatch (kg) | | | | Clean & Jerk (kg) | | | | Total |
| Rank | Athlete | Group | Body weight | 1 | 2 | 3 | Rank | 1 | 2 | 3 | Rank | Total |
|---|---|---|---|---|---|---|---|---|---|---|---|---|
| 1st place, gold medalist(s) | Iryna Dekha (UKR) | A | | 110 | 114 | 116 | 1st place, gold medalist(s) | 130 | 134 | 137 | 1st place, gold medalist(s) | 253 |
| 2nd place, silver medalist(s) | Alina Marushchak (UKR) | A | | 108 | ~~112~~ | ~~113~~ | 2nd place, silver medalist(s) | 127 | ~~134~~ | ~~137~~ | 3rd place, bronze medalist(s) | 235 |
| 3rd place, bronze medalist(s) | Dilara Narin (TUR) | A | | 96 | 99 | ~~102~~ | 4 | 125 | 129 | 133 | 2nd place, silver medalist(s) | 232 |
| 4 | Weronika Zielińska-Stubińska (POL) | A | | ~~98~~ | 98 | ~~102~~ | 5 | 121 | ~~127~~ | 127 | 4 | 225 |
| 5 | Nina Schroth (GER) | A | | 98 | 101 | ~~103~~ | 3rd place, bronze medalist(s) | 117 | ~~121~~ | ~~121~~ | 6 | 218 |
| 6 | Ida Rönn (SWE) | A | | 90 | 95 | ~~99~~ | 6 | 115 | 121 | ~~126~~ | 5 | 216 |
| 7 | Clara Jul Andreasen (DEN) | A | | 92 | 95 | ~~97~~ | 7 | 110 | 114 | ~~116~~ | 7 | 209 |
| 8 | Deborah Alawode (GBR) | A | | 89 | ~~92~~ | 92 | 9 | ~~114~~ | 114 | ~~118~~ | 8 | 206 |
| 9 | Nikola Seničová (SVK) | A | | 91 | ~~96~~ | ~~97~~ | 10 | ~~111~~ | 111 | ~~116~~ | 9 | 202 |
| 10 | Lenka Žembová (SVK) | B | | 88 | 91 | 93 | 8 | ~~102~~ | ~~102~~ | 102 | 11 | 195 |
| 11 | Veronika Storm (DEN) | B | | 85 | ~~88~~ | ~~89~~ | 11 | 102 | 107 | ~~111~~ | 10 | 192 |
| 12 | Simona Hertlová (CZE) | B | | 80 | 83 | ~~86~~ | 13 | 95 | ~~99~~ | 99 | 13 | 182 |
| 13 | Simona Jeřábková (CZE) | B | | 78 | 81 | 84 | 12 | ~~97~~ | ~~97~~ | 97 | 14 | 181 |
| 14 | Michelle Jacobs (NED) | B | | ~~68~~ | ~~68~~ | 68 | 14 | ~~97~~ | ~~97~~ | 97 | 12 | 168 |

=== Women's 87 kg ===
| Rank | Athlete | Group | Body weight | Snatch (kg) | | | | Clean & Jerk (kg) | | | | Total |
| Rank | Athlete | Group | Body weight | 1 | 2 | 3 | Rank | 1 | 2 | 3 | Rank | Total |
|---|---|---|---|---|---|---|---|---|---|---|---|---|
| 1st place, gold medalist(s) | Solfrid Koanda (NOR) | A | | 103 | 107 | 109 | 1st place, gold medalist(s) | 133 | 138 | 143 | 1st place, gold medalist(s) | 252 |
| 2nd place, silver medalist(s) | Anastasiia Manievska (UKR) | A | | 104 | ~~107~~ | 107 | 2nd place, silver medalist(s) | ~~126~~ | 126 | 130 | 2nd place, silver medalist(s) | 237 |
| 3rd place, bronze medalist(s) | Anastasiia Hotfrid (GEO) | A | | ~~106~~ | 106 | ~~109~~ | 3rd place, bronze medalist(s) | 125 | ~~129~~ | 129 | 4 | 235 |
| 4 | Elena Cîlcic (MDA) | A | | ~~103~~ | ~~103~~ | 103 | 5 | 125 | 129 | ~~133~~ | 3rd place, bronze medalist(s) | 232 |
| 5 | Hripsime Khurshudyan (ARM) | A | | 102 | 105 | ~~108~~ | 4 | ~~122~~ | 122 | ~~127~~ | 5 | 227 |
| 6 | Valentyna Kisil (UKR) | A | | 100 | ~~103~~ | ~~103~~ | 6 | 113 | ~~116~~ | 116 | 7 | 216 |
| 7 | Eliise Peterson (EST) | A | | ~~90~~ | 90 | ~~95~~ | 9 | 110 | 116 | ~~120~~ | 6 | 206 |
| 8 | Viktória Boros (HUN) | A | | 92 | 95 | ~~98~~ | 7 | 107 | ~~112~~ | ~~112~~ | 9 | 202 |
| 9 | Dzhesika Ivanova (BUL) | A | | 88 | ~~91~~ | ~~92~~ | 10 | ~~110~~ | 110 | ~~115~~ | 8 | 198 |
| 10 | Paula Junhov Rindberg (SWE) | A | | ~~91~~ | 91 | ~~94~~ | 8 | 106 | ~~110~~ | ~~110~~ | 10 | 197 |

=== Women's +87 kg ===
| Rank | Athlete | Group | Body weight | Snatch (kg) | | | | Clean & Jerk (kg) | | | | Total |
| Rank | Athlete | Group | Body weight | 1 | 2 | 3 | Rank | 1 | 2 | 3 | Rank | Total |
|---|---|---|---|---|---|---|---|---|---|---|---|---|
| 1st place, gold medalist(s) | Emily Campbell (GBR) | A | | 110 | 114 | 118 | 1st place, gold medalist(s) | 142 | 148 | 153 | 1st place, gold medalist(s) | 271 |
| 2nd place, silver medalist(s) | Melike Günal (TUR) | A | | 102 | 105 | 108 | 2nd place, silver medalist(s) | 125 | 130 | 134 | 2nd place, silver medalist(s) | 242 |
| 3rd place, bronze medalist(s) | Sarah Fischer (AUT) | A | | 97 | 100 | 102 | 3rd place, bronze medalist(s) | 128 | ~~131~~ | ~~135~~ | 3rd place, bronze medalist(s) | 230 |
| 4 | Aleyna Kaymaz (TUR) | A | | 93 | 97 | 101 | 4 | 125 | ~~131~~ | ~~131~~ | 4 | 226 |
| 5 | Krystyna Borodina (UKR) | A | | 95 | ~~98~~ | 98 | 5 | 123 | ~~129~~ | ~~129~~ | 5 | 221 |
| 6 | Tereza Králová (CZE) | A | | 80 | 84 | 87 | 6 | 100 | 105 | 113 | 6 | 200 |
| 7 | Barbara Gyürüs (HUN) | A | | 78 | 81 | 84 | 7 | 98 | 101 | ~~109~~ | 7 | 185 |
