= 2017 Youth World Weightlifting Championships =

- Location: Bangkok, Thailand
- Dates: 1 – 11 April
- Competitors: 424 from 49 nations

The 2017 Youth World Weightlifting Championships was held in Bangkok, Thailand from 1 April to 11 April, 2017.

== Medal table ==
Ranking by Big (Total result) medals

* Host nation (Thailand)

Rank	Nation	Gold	Silver	Bronze	Total
1	China	4	2	3	9
2	Kazakhstan	3	1	2	6
3	United States	2	0	1	3
4	North Korea	1	2	1	4
5	Russia	1	2	0	3
6	Thailand*	1	0	1	2
6	Turkey	1	0	1	2
8	Belarus	1	0	0	1
8	Bulgaria	1	0	0	1
8	Ecuador	1	0	0	1
11	Colombia	0	2	0	2
12	Uzbekistan	0	1	2	3
13	Ukraine	0	1	1	2
14	Austria	0	1	0	1
14	Greece	0	1	0	1
14	India	0	1	0	1
14	Poland	0	1	0	1
14	Vietnam	0	1	0	1
19	Iran	0	0	2	2
20	Indonesia	0	0	1	1
20	Mexico	0	0	1	1
Totals (21 entries)		16	16	16	48

Ranking by all medals: Big (Total result) and Small (Snatch and Clean & Jerk)

* Host nation (Thailand)

Rank	Nation	Gold	Silver	Bronze	Total
1	China	11	9	7	27
2	Kazakhstan	7	3	8	18
3	Russia	4	5	1	10
4	North Korea	4	3	3	10
5	United States	4	2	2	8
6	Thailand*	3	1	3	7
7	Bulgaria	3	0	0	3
7	Ecuador	3	0	0	3
9	Turkey	2	2	3	7
10	Belarus	2	0	1	3
11	Colombia	1	6	0	7
12	Austria	1	2	0	3
12	Poland	1	2	0	3
14	Iran	1	1	2	4
14	Vietnam	1	1	2	4
16	Uzbekistan	0	4	5	9
17	India	0	3	1	4
18	Greece	0	2	0	2
19	Ukraine	0	1	4	5
20	Mexico	0	1	3	4
21	Indonesia	0	0	1	1
21	Oman	0	0	1	1
21	Romania	0	0	1	1
Totals (23 entries)		48	48	48	144

== Medal overview ==
=== Men ===
Event		Gold		Silver		Bronze	
– 50 kg	Snatch	Nguyen Quoc Bao Le (VIE)	96 kg	Natthawat Chomchuen (THA)	94 kg	Hanpeng Deng (CHN)	92 kg
– 50 kg	Clean & Jerk	Teerapat Chomchuen (THA)	125 kg	Shiguo Huang (CHN)	123 kg	Nguyen Quoc Bao Le (VIE)	119 kg
– 50 kg	Total	Teerapat Chomchuen (THA)	216 kg	Nguyen Quoc Bao Le (VIE)	215 kg	Shiguo Huang (CHN)	213 kg
– 56 kg	Snatch	Jian Chen (CHN)	111 kg	Jeremy Lalrinnunga (IND)	110 kg	Caner Toptaş (TUR)	109 kg
– 56 kg	Clean & Jerk	Maoran Chen (CHN)	135 kg	Jeremy Lalrinnunga (IND)	130 kg	Caner Toptaş (TUR)	128 kg
– 56 kg	Total	Maoran Chen (CHN)	241 kg	Jeremy Lalrinnunga (IND)	240 kg	Caner Toptaş (TUR)	237 kg
– 62 kg	Snatch	Zulfat Garaev (RUS)	128 kg	Anatoliy Savelyev (KAZ)	127 kg	Yunban Wei (CHN)	126 kg
– 62 kg	Clean & Jerk	Anatoliy Savelyev (KAZ)	154 kg	Yunban Wei (CHN)	150 kg	Gulam Navi (IND)	148 kg
– 62 kg	Total	Anatoliy Savelyev (KAZ)	281 kg	Yunban Wei (CHN)	276 kg	Muhammad Halim Setiawan (INA)	267 kg
– 69 kg	Snatch	Ri Kwang Song (PRK)	140 kg	Clarence Cummings Jr (USA)	137 kg	Su Lian (CHN)	136 kg
– 69 kg	Clean & Jerk	Clarence Cummings Jr (USA)	185 kg YWR	Wei Nianrong (CHN)	172 kg	Paul Dumitrascu (ROU)	166 kg
– 69 kg	Total	Clarence Cummings Jr (USA)	322 kg =YWR	Ri Kwang Song (PRK)	306 kg	Wei Nianrong (CHN)	306 kg
– 77 kg	Snatch	Aleksandr Urvachev (RUS)	142 kg	Harrison Maurus (USA)	140 kg	Assylzhan Bektay (KAZ)	140 kg
– 77 kg	Clean & Jerk	Harrison Maurus (USA)	192 kg YWR	Aleksandr Urvachev (RUS)	170 kg	Assylzhan Bektay (KAZ)	166 kg
– 77 kg	Total	Harrison Maurus (USA)	332 kg	Aleksandr Urvachev (RUS)	312 kg	Assylzhan Bektay (KAZ)	306 kg
– 85 kg	Snatch	Bartłomiej Adamus (POL)	143 kg	Tolga Bakıcı (TUR)	139 kg	Artyom Antropov (KAZ)	138 kg
– 85 kg	Clean & Jerk	Artyom Antropov (KAZ)	185 kg	Bartłomiej Adamus (POL)	175 kg	Murshid Mohamed Murshid Al Ajmi (OMA)	173 kg
– 85 kg	Total	Artyom Antropov (KAZ)	323 kg	Bartłomiej Adamus (POL)	318 kg	Mahdi Papi (IRI)	304 kg
– 94 kg	Snatch	Hristo Hristov (BUL)	145 kg	Evangelos Galiatsatos (GRE)	144 kg	Aleksandr Li (UZB)	138 kg
– 94 kg	Clean & Jerk	Hristo Hristov (BUL)	176 kg	Saidmukhtor Saidakhrorov (UZB)	175 kg	Aleksandr Li (UZB)	173 kg
– 94 kg	Total	Hristo Hristov (BUL)	321 kg	Evangelos Galiatsatos (GRE)	316 kg	Aleksandr Li (UZB)	311 kg
+ 94 kg	Snatch	Kanstantsin Kurouski (BLR)	165 kg	Mohammadreza Roshani (IRI)	156 kg	Dmitrii Gogichaev (RUS)	155 kg
+ 94 kg	Clean & Jerk	Mohammad Shahabandaz (IRI)	205 kg	Dmitrii Gogichaev (RUS)	197 kg	Kanstantsin Kurouski (BLR)	195 kg
+ 94 kg	Total	Kanstantsin Kurouski (BLR)	360 kg	Dmitrii Gogichaev (RUS)	352 kg	Mohammadreza Roshani (IRI)	347 kg

=== Women ===
Event		Gold		Silver		Bronze	
– 44 kg	Snatch	Yarou Chen (CHN)	72 kg	Manuela Berrío (COL)	71 kg	Song Hui Pak (PRK)	70 kg
– 44 kg	Clean & Jerk	Yarou Chen (CHN)	92 kg	Manuela Berrío (COL)	89 kg	Song Hui Pak (PRK)	87 kg
– 44 kg	Total	Yarou Chen (CHN)	164 kg	Manuela Berrío (COL)	160 kg	Song Hui Pak (PRK)	157 kg
– 48 kg	Snatch	Si He (CHN)	81 kg	Jong Sim Han (PRK)	79 kg	Thi Chuc My Luu (VIE)	72 kg
– 48 kg	Clean & Jerk	Jong Sim Han (PRK)	102 kg	Si He (CHN)	98 kg	Chotima Buachatturat (THA)	90 kg
– 48 kg	Total	Jong Sim Han (PRK)	181 kg	Si He (CHN)	179 kg	Chotima Buachatturat (THA)	158 kg
– 53 kg	Snatch	Yenny Sinisterra (COL)	85 kg	Mengqian Yu (CHN)	85 kg	Kamila Konotop (UKR)	85 kg
– 53 kg	Clean & Jerk	Kim Il-gyong (PRK)	107 kg	Xuemei Huang (CHN)	106 kg	Mengqian Yu (CHN)	104 kg
– 53 kg	Total	Mengqian Yu (CHN)	189 kg	Kim Il-gyong (PRK)	188 kg	Kamila Konotop (UKR)	186 kg
– 58 kg	Snatch	Ailada Emdu (THA)	88 kg	Nuray Levent (TUR)	84 kg	Mariia Hanhur (UKR)	84 kg
– 58 kg	Clean & Jerk	Nuray Levent (TUR)	107 kg	Kumushkhon Fayzullaeva (UZB)	106 kg	Mariia Hanhur (UKR)	102 kg
– 58 kg	Total	Nuray Levent (TUR)	191 kg	Mariia Hanhur (UKR)	186 kg	Kumushkhon Fayzullaeva (UZB)	185 kg
– 63 kg	Snatch	Lin Fang (CHN)	93 kg	Darya Pavlova (KAZ)	90 kg	Jessica Jarquin Gonzalez (MEX)	89 kg
– 63 kg	Clean & Jerk	Lin Fang (CHN)	117 kg	Yunliu Jiang (CHN)	113 kg	Darya Pavlova (KAZ)	111 kg
– 63 kg	Total	Lin Fang (CHN)	210 kg	Darya Pavlova (KAZ)	201 kg	Yunliu Jiang (CHN)	199 kg
– 69 kg	Snatch	Angie Palacios (ECU)	100 kg	Valeria Rivas (COL)	95 kg	Karina Kuzganbayeva (KAZ)	94 kg
– 69 kg	Clean & Jerk	Angie Palacios (ECU)	120 kg	Valeria Rivas (COL)	114 kg	Karina Kuzganbayeva (KAZ)	113 kg
– 69 kg	Total	Angie Palacios (ECU)	220 kg	Valeria Rivas (COL)	209 kg	Karina Kuzganbayeva (KAZ)	207 kg
– 75 kg	Snatch	Olga Pastukhova (KAZ)	91 kg	Angela Yazmin Lopez (MEX)	90 kg	Gulnoza Akhmadova (UZB)	89 kg
– 75 kg	Clean & Jerk	Olga Pastukhova (KAZ)	120 kg	Gulnoza Akhmadova (UZB)	108 kg	Angela Yazmin Lopez (MEX)	106 kg
– 75 kg	Total	Olga Pastukhova (KAZ)	211 kg	Gulnoza Akhmadova (UZB)	197 kg	Angela Yazmin Lopez (MEX)	196 kg
+ 75 kg	Snatch	Sarah Fischer (AUT)	99 kg	Daria Riazanova (RUS)	98 kg	Kuinini Manumua (USA)	93 kg
+ 75 kg	Clean & Jerk	Daria Riazanova (RUS)	125 kg	Sarah Fischer (AUT)	119 kg	Supatchanin Khamhaeng (THA)	118 kg
+ 75 kg	Total	Daria Riazanova (RUS)	223 kg	Sarah Fischer (AUT)	218 kg	Kuinini Manumua (USA)	210 kg

== Team ranking ==
=== Men ===
Rank	Team	Points
1	China	542
2	Iran	437
3	Kazakhstan	402
4	Russia	370
5	Turkey	370
6	United States	322

=== Women ===
Rank	Team	Points
1	China	522
2	Thailand	418
3	Kazakhstan	416
4	United States	414
5	Uzbekistan	410
6	Romania	409
