= Evagjelia Veli =

Albanian weightlifter (born 1991)

Personal information
- Nationality: Albanian
- Born: 16 July 1991 (age 34) Fier, Albania
- Height: 1.5 m (4 ft 11 in)
- Weight: 55 kg (121 lb)

Sport
- Country: Albania
- Sport: Weightlifting
- Event: Women's 55 kg
- Club: Tirana

Achievements and titles
- Olympic finals: 8
- Highest world ranking: 1
Medal record
Women's weightlifting
Representing Albania
European Championships
Gold medal – first place	2022 Tirana	55 kg

Evagjelia Veli (born 16 July 1991) is an Albanian weightlifter. She won the gold medal in her event at the 2022 European Weightlifting Championships held in Tirana, Albania.

She competed at the 2016 Summer Olympics in Rio de Janeiro, in the women's 53 kg. She finished in 8th place. She competed at the Senior European Weightlifting Championship 2016 in Forde in Women's 53 kg. She finished in 5th place. She competed at the Senior European Weightlifting Championship 2017 in Split in Women's 53 kg, and finished in 4th place.

In May 2022 she tested positive for presence of stanozolol metabolite and exogenous 5αAdiol and/or 5βAdiol and is subsequently suspended until July 2027.
