= Lisa Schweizer =

German weightlifter (born 1995)

Personal information
- Citizenship: German
- Born: 18 July 1995 (age 30) Schwedt, Germany

Sport
- Country: Germany
- Sport: Weightlifting
- Weight class: 71 kg
Medal record
Women's weightlifting
Representing Germany
European Championships
Silver medal – second place	2022 Tirana	71 kg
Bronze medal – third place	2024 Sofia	71 kg
Bronze medal – third place	2026 Batumi	69 kg

Lisa Marie Schweizer (born 18 July 1995) is a German weightlifter. She represented Germany at the 2020 Summer Olympics in Tokyo, Japan.

Schweizer won the silver medal in her event at the 2022 European Weightlifting Championships held in Tirana, Albania.
