= David Fischerov =

Bulgarian weightlifter (born 1998)

Personal information
- Nationality: Bulgarian (2020–present); Austrian (1998–2020)
- Born: David Fischer; 3 November 1998 (age 27) Austria
- Weight: 102 kg (225 lb)

Sport
- Country: Bulgaria
- Sport: Weightlifting
- Weight class: –102 kg
Medal record
Representing Bulgaria
European Championships
Gold medal – first place	2022 Tirana	–102 kg
Representing Austria
European Junior & U23 Weightlifting Championships
Silver medal – second place	2018 Zamość	–105 kg

David Fischerov (Bulgarian: Давид Фишеров; born 3 November 1998), also known as David Fischer, is an Austrian-Bulgarian weightlifter. As a junior he has spent several training camps in Bulgaria to increase his performance. After a major dispute with the Austrian weightlifting federation, he decided to compete for Bulgaria instead. He speaks the Bulgarian language fluently and was granted a Bulgarian passport in February 2020. His sister is Austrian weightlifter Sarah Fischer. Fischerov tested positive for presence of trenbolone in March 2023 and was consequently banned from competition for three years.

== Career ==
=== European Championships ===
In 2021, he competed at the 2021 European Weightlifting Championships in the 102 kg category, winning the silver in the clean & jerk portion and the 4th in the total. Next year 2022 at 2022 European Weightlifting Championships in the 102 kg category, he become European champion, winning gold in snatch, clean and jerk and total 392 kg.

== Major results ==
Year	Venue	Weight	Snatch (kg)				Clean & Jerk (kg)				Total	Rank
Year	Venue	Weight	1	2	3	Rank	1	2	3	Rank	Total	Rank
Representing Bulgaria
World Championships
2022	Bogotá, Colombia	102 kg	170	~~174~~	~~175~~	10	---	---	---	---	---	---
European Championships
2021	Moscow, Russia	102 kg	160	165	168	6	205	210	~~213~~	2nd place, silver medalist(s)	378	4
2022	Tirana, Albania	102 kg	170	175	177	1st place, gold medalist(s)	209	212	215	1st place, gold medalist(s)	392	1st place, gold medalist(s)
2026	(Georgia (country)) Batumi, Georgia	110 kg	169	~~172~~	172	8	~~211~~	~~211~~	211	9	383	8
Representing Austria
European Junior & U23 Weightlifting Championships
2018	Zamość, Poland	105 kg	~~162~~	162	~~165~~	5	200	205	~~211~~	2nd place, silver medalist(s)	367	(silver)
