= Kaan Kahriman =

Turkish weightlifter (born 2004)

Personal information
- Born: 9 December 2004 (age 21) Antalya, Turkey
- Education: Bartın University
- Height: 1.65 m (5 ft 5 in)
- Weight: 67 kg (148 lb)

Sport
- Country: Turkey
- Sport: Weightlifting
Medal record
Men's weightlifting
Representing Turkey
European Championships
Gold medal – first place	2025 Chișinău	67 kg
Silver medal – second place	2024 Sofia	67 kg
Bronze medal – third place	2023 Yerevan	67 kg
Islamic Solidarity Games
Bronze medal – third place	2021 Konya	67 kg S
European U23 Championships
Silver medal – second place	2025 Durres	79 kg
World Junior Championships
Silver medal – second place	2022 Heraklion	61 kg
Silver medal – second place	2024 León	67 kg
European Junior Championships
Gold medal – first place	2023 Bucharest	67 kg
Gold medal – first place	2024 Raszyn	67 kg
Bronze medal – third place	2022 Durrës	61 kg
Youth World Championships
Silver medal – second place	2021 Jeddah	61 kg
European Youth Championships
Silver medal – second place	2021 Ciechanów	61 kg
Bronze medal – third place	2018 San Donato	62 kg

Kaan Kahriman (born 9 December 2004) is a Turkish weightlifter competing in the 67 kg division. He won the gold medal at the 2025 European Weightlifting Championships.

== Personal life ==
He attended Mareşal Fevzi Çakmak Middle School in his hometown Antalya, and Eryaman Şehit Ertan Akgül Anatolian High School in Eryaman, Etimesgut, Ankara. After completing his secondary education, he started studying in the Sport Science Faculty at Bartın University.

== Sport career ==
Kahriman received the bronze medal in the 62 kg total event at the 2018 European Youth Weightlifting Championships held in San Donato Milanese , Italy. He took the gold medal in the snatch event and the silver medal in total at the 61 kg division at the 2021 Youth World Weightlifting Championships in Jeddah, Saudi Arabia. In 2022, he won the gold medal in the snatch event and the silver medal at the 61 kg division of the Junior World Weightlifting Championships held in Heraklion, Greece. He received the bronze medal in the 67 kg snatch event at the 2021 Islamic Solidarity Games in Konya, Turkey. At the 67 kg division of the 2023 European Weightlifting Championships in Yerevan, Armenia, he won the silver medal in the snatch event and the bronze medal in total.

Kaan Kahriman, who lifted 148 kilograms in the 67 kg snatch at the 2024 World Weightlifting Championships in Manama, Bahrain, broke the world record in the junior weightlifting category and won the bronze medal.

Kaan Kahriman won the gold medal with 146 kg in the snatch and silver medal with 170 kg in the Clean & Jerk, and became the European champion with 316 kg in total at the 2025 European Weightlifting Championships held in Chișinău, Moldova.

Year	Competition	Venue	Weight	Snatch		Clean & Jerk		Total	
Year	Competition	Venue	Weight	(kg)	Rank	(kg)	Rank	(kg)	Rank
2018	European Youth Championships	San Donato Milanese, Italy	62 kg	95	4th	112	6th	207	3rd place, bronze medalist(s)
2021	World Junior Championships	Tashkent, Uzbekistan	61 kg	118	5th	138	9th	256	4th
2021	European Youth Championships	Ciechanów, Poland	61 kg	122	1st place, gold medalist(s)	135	2nd place, silver medalist(s)	257	2nd place, silver medalist(s)
2021	Youth World Championships	Jeddah, Saudi Arabia	61 kg	123; YWR	1st place, gold medalist(s)	141	4th	264	2nd place, silver medalist(s)
2022	World Junior Championships	Heraklion, Greece	61 kg	126	1st place, gold medalist(s)	143	7th	269	2nd place, silver medalist(s)
2022	European Championships	Tirana, Albania	61 kg	126	5th	145	6th	271	6th
2022	Islamic Solidarity Games	Konya, Turkey	67 kg	138	3rd place, bronze medalist(s)	158	8th	296	6th
2022	European Junior & U23 Championships	Durrës, Albania	67 kg	137	1st place, gold medalist(s)	156	5th	293	3rd place, bronze medalist(s)
2022	World Championships	Bogotá, Colombia	67 kg	141	6th	165	12th	306	10th
2023	European Championships	Yerevan, Armenia	67 kg	141	2nd place, silver medalist(s)	160	6th	301	3rd place, bronze medalist(s)
2023	European Junior & U23 Championships	Bucharest, Romania	67 kg	137	1st place, gold medalist(s)	156	1st place, gold medalist(s)	293	1st place, gold medalist(s)
2023	World Championships	Riyadh, Saudi Arabia	67 kg	137	6th	161	10th	298	10th
2024	European Championships	Sofia, Bulgaria	67 kg	142	1st place, gold medalist(s)	168	3rd place, bronze medalist(s)	310	2nd place, silver medalist(s)
2024	World Junior Championships	León, Spain	67 kg	143	1st place, gold medalist(s)	169	2nd place, silver medalist(s)	312	2nd place, silver medalist(s)
2024	European Junior & U23 Championships	Raszyn, Poland	67 kg	144	1st place, gold medalist(s)	156	1st place, gold medalist(s)	300	1st place, gold medalist(s)
2024	World Championships	Manama, Bahrain	67 kg	148; JWR	3rd place, bronze medalist(s)	175	5th	323	5th
2025	European Championships	Chișinău, Moldova	67 kg	146	1st place, gold medalist(s)	170	2nd place, silver medalist(s)	316	1st place, gold medalist(s)
2025	World Championships	Førde, Norway	71 kg	148	7th	180	8th	328	7th
