= Anastasiia Manievska =

Ukrainian weightlifter (born 1998)

Personal information
- Born: 9 September 1998 (age 27) Zaporizhzhia Oblast, Ukraine

Sport
- Country: Ukraine
- Sport: Weightlifting
- Weight class: 87 kg
- Coached by: Anatoliy Orlov
Medal record
Women's weightlifting
Representing Ukraine
European Championships
Silver medal – second place	2022 Tirana	87 kg
Silver medal – second place	2023 Yerevan	87 kg
Silver medal – second place	2024 Sofia	87 kg
Bronze medal – third place	2025 Chișinău	87 kg
European Junior & U23 Championships
Gold medal – first place	2021 Rovaniemi	U23 81 kg
Silver medal – second place	2019 Bucharest	U23 81 kg

Anastasiia Manievska (born 9 September 1998 in Zaporizhzhia Oblast, Ukraine) is a Ukrainian weightlifter. She won silver medal at the 2022 European Championships in Tirana, Albania, finishing second behind Solfrid Koanda from Norway. She repeteated the success at the 2023 European Championships.

Manievska graduated from Zaporizhzhia National University. She trained at the Leonid Zhabotynskyi Weightlifting School in Zaporizhzhia.

== Major results ==
Year	Venue	Weight	Snatch (kg)				Clean & Jerk (kg)				Total	Rank
Year	Venue	Weight	1	2	3	Rank	1	2	3	Rank	Total	Rank
European Championships
2022	Tirana, Albania	87 kg	104	~~107~~	107	2nd place, silver medalist(s)	~~126~~	126	130	2nd place, silver medalist(s)	237	2nd place, silver medalist(s)
2023	Yerevan, Armenia	87 kg	103	105	108	2nd place, silver medalist(s)	125	130	~~135~~	2nd place, silver medalist(s)	238	2nd place, silver medalist(s)
2024	Sofia, Bulgaria	87 kg	102	~~105~~	~~106~~	6	126	128	—	2nd place, silver medalist(s)	230	2nd place, silver medalist(s)
2025	Chișinău, Moldova	87 kg	102	105	~~107~~	5	125	~~130~~	130	4	235	3rd place, bronze medalist(s)
European U23 Championships
2019	Bucharest, Romania	81 kg	80	83	85	3rd place, bronze medalist(s)	100	104	~~106~~	3rd place, bronze medalist(s)	189	2nd place, silver medalist(s)
2021	Rovaniemi, Finland	81 kg	~~96~~	96	98	1st place, gold medalist(s)	117	120	127	1st place, gold medalist(s)	225	1st place, gold medalist(s)
