= Sarah Fischer (weightlifter) =

Austrian weightlifter (born 2000)

Personal information
- Born: 9 November 2000 (age 25)

Sport
- Country: Austria
- Sport: Weightlifting
- Weight class: +87 kg
Medal record
Women's weightlifting
Representing Austria
European Championships
Silver medal – second place	2018 Bucharest	90 kg
Bronze medal – third place	2019 Batumi	87 kg
Bronze medal – third place	2022 Tirana	+87 kg
IWF World Cup
Bronze medal – third place	2020 Rome	87 kg
Junior World Championships
Bronze medal – third place	2018 Tashkent	90 kg

Sarah Fischer (born 9 November 2000) is an Austrian weightlifter. She is a three-time medalist at the European Weightlifting Championships. She also represented Austria at the 2020 Summer Olympics in Tokyo, Japan. Her brother is weightlifter David Fischer.

== Career ==
At the 2017 Youth World Weightlifting Championships held in Bangkok, Thailand, Fischer won the silver medal in the women's +75 kg event. In that same year, at the 2017 European Junior & U23 Weightlifting Championships held in Durrës, Albania, she won the silver medal in the women's junior 90 kg event.

In 2018, Fischer won the bronze medal in the women's 90 kg event at the Junior World Weightlifting Championships held in Tashkent, Uzbekistan.

In 2019, at the European Weightlifting Championships held in Batumi, Georgia, Fischer won the bronze medal in the women's 87 kg event. In that same year, she also won the silver medal in the women's junior 87 kg event at the 2019 European Junior & U23 Weightlifting Championships in Bucharest, Romania.

In 2020, she won the bronze medal in the women's 87 kg event at the Roma 2020 World Cup in Rome, Italy. In 2021, she competed in her event at the European Weightlifting Championships held in Moscow, Russia.

Fischer represented Austria at the 2020 Summer Olympics in Tokyo, Japan. She finished in 10th place in the women's +87 kg event. At the 2021 European Junior & U23 Weightlifting Championships in Rovaniemi, Finland, she won the silver medal in her event.

Fischer won the bronze medal in her event at the 2022 European Weightlifting Championships held in Tirana, Albania. She won the gold medal in her event at the 2022 European Junior & U23 Weightlifting Championships held in Durrës, Albania.

In 2023, she competed in the women's +87 kg event at the European Weightlifting Championships held in Yerevan, Armenia. She won the bronze medal in the Clean & Jerk. She also competed at the 2024 European Weightlifting Championships held in Sofia, Bulgaria.

== Achievements ==
Year	Venue	Weight	Snatch (kg)				Clean & Jerk (kg)				Total	Rank
Year	Venue	Weight	1	2	3	Rank	1	2	3	Rank	Total	Rank
Summer Olympics
2021	Tokyo, Japan	+87 kg	93	~~97~~	97	—N/a	117	~~123~~	123	—N/a	220	10
World Championships
2019	Pattaya, Thailand	87 kg	97	~~102~~	~~102~~	14	~~125~~	125	~~130~~	9	222	10
European Championships
2018	Bucharest, Romania	90 kg	97	~~100~~	101	3rd place, bronze medalist(s)	122	125	~~127~~	3rd place, bronze medalist(s)	226	2nd place, silver medalist(s)
2019	Batumi, Georgia	87 kg	97	102	~~105~~	4	125	129	~~133~~	3rd place, bronze medalist(s)	231	3rd place, bronze medalist(s)
2021	Moscow, Russia	87 kg	95	99	~~102~~	9	118	~~123~~	123	7	222	7
2022	Tirana, Albania	+87 kg	97	100	102	3rd place, bronze medalist(s)	128	~~131~~	~~135~~	3rd place, bronze medalist(s)	230	3rd place, bronze medalist(s)
2023	Yerevan, Armenia	+87 kg	99	~~103~~	104	5	128	132	134	3rd place, bronze medalist(s)	238	5
2024	Sofia, Bulgaria	+87 kg	97	101	~~105~~	6	125	130	~~132~~	4	231	5
2025	Chișinău, Moldova	87 kg	~~95~~	~~95~~	~~95~~	—	—	—	—	—	—	—
World Cup
2020	Rome, Italy	87 kg	~~98~~	~~98~~	98	5	123	~~128~~	~~128~~	3rd place, bronze medalist(s)	221	3rd place, bronze medalist(s)

== Doping Controversy ==
According to multiple sources, Sarah Fischer was introduced to ephedrine and amphetamines when she was only 17, allegedly under pressure from her father and coach, Ewald Fischer, during an intensive training camp in Romania."Weightlifting: Austria's David Fischer switches to Bulgaria". Inside the Games."Gewichtheben: Rohrendorfer Gewichtheber droht Dopingsperre". NOEN. Critics within the Austrian Weightlifting Federation (ÖGV) condemned this approach as unethical, highlighting the risks associated with relying on performance-enhancing stimulants at such a young age. Ewald Fischer's coaching tactics were further scrutinized for prioritizing rapid results over athlete well-being.

Concerns about the family's training environment deepened in 2024, when Fischer's brother, David, tested positive for trenbolone, an anabolic steroid explicitly banned under World Anti-Doping Agency (WADA) regulations. This incident exacerbated tensions with the Austrian federation, ultimately contributing to a public fallout and David's decision to compete internationally for Bulgaria. Despite Sarah Fischer's achievements in the sport, her early involvement with stimulants and the broader doping allegations within her family continue to raise serious doubts about the legitimacy of her accomplishments and cast a prolonged shadow over her career.
