= Rafik Harutyunyan =

Armenian weightlifter

Medal record
Representing Armenia
Men's weightlifting
European Championships
Gold medal – first place	2022 Tirana	-81 kg
Bronze medal – third place	2023 Yerevan	-81 kg
Bronze medal – third place	2024 Sofia	-81 kg

Rafik Armeni Harutyunyan (born 17 May 2000), is an Armenian weightlifter, member of the Armenian national weightlifting team, gold medalist at the 2022 European Weightlifting Championships and bronze medalist at the 2023 European Weightlifting Championships.

== Biography ==
Rafik Harutyunyan was born on May 17, 2000.

At the 2022 European Championships held in Tirana, the weightlifter from Gyumri achieved a total result of 354 kg in the 81 kg weight category and became the European Champion. He also won a small gold medal in the clean and jerk exercise with 194 kg and a small silver medal in the snatch exercise with 160 kg.

At the 2023 European Weightlifting Championships held in Yerevan, Rafik Harutyunyan achieved a total result of 337 kg in the 81 kg weight category and was awarded the bronze medal.
