= Monika Marach =

Polish weightlifter (born 2004)

Personal information
- Citizenship: Poland
- Born: 16 April 2004 (age 22)

Sport
- Sport: Weightlifting
- Weight class: 71 kg
Medal record
Women's weightlifting
Representing Poland
European Championships
Bronze medal – third place	2022 Tirana	71 kg

Monika Marach (born 16 April 2004) is a Polish weightlifter. She won the bronze medal in the 71 kg category at the 2022 European Weightlifting Championships.
