= Dilara Narin =

Turkish weightlifter (born 2002)

Personal information
- Born: 17 March 2002 (age 24) Konya, Turkey
- Education: Selçuk University

Sport
- Country: Turkey
- Sport: Weightlifting
Medal record
Women's weightlifting
Representing Turkey
European Championships
| Silver medal – second place | 2023 Yerevan | 81 kg |
| Bronze medal – third place | 2022 Tirana | 81 kg |
| Bronze medal – third place | 2024 Sofia | 81 kg |
Islamic Solidarity Games
| Gold medal – first place | 2021 Konya | 81 kg CJ |
| Gold medal – first place | 2021 Konya | 81 kg T |
| Silver medal – second place | 2021 Konya | 81 kg S |
World Junior Championships
| Gold medal – first place | 2022 Heraklion | 81 kg |
| Silver medal – second place | 2019 Suva | 76 kg |
European Junior Championships
| Gold medal – first place | 2018 Zamość | 75 kg |
| Gold medal – first place | 2019 Bucharest | 76 kg |
Summer Youth Olympics
| Gold medal – first place | 2018 Buenos Aires | +63 kg |
European Youth Championships
| Gold medal – first place | 2017 Pristina | 75 kg |
| Gold medal – first place | 2018 San Donato Milanese | +75 kg |

Dilara Narin (born 17 March 2002) is a Turkish weightlifter. She won the gold medal in the women's 81 kg event at the 2021 Islamic Solidarity Games held in Konya, Turkey. She won the bronze medal in the women's 81 kg event at the 2022 European Weightlifting Championships held in Tirana, Albania.

== Career ==
Narin won the gold medal in the girls' +63 kg event at the 2018 Summer Youth Olympics held in Buenos Aires, Argentina. At the time, she won the silver medal but Supatchanin Khamhaeng of Thailand was stripped of her gold medal after testing positive for a banned substance.

Narin won the gold medal in her event at the 2022 Junior World Weightlifting Championships held in Heraklion, Greece. She won the bronze medal in the women's 81 kg event at the 2022 European Weightlifting Championships held in Tirana, Albania. She won the gold medal in the women's 81 kg event at the 2021 Islamic Solidarity Games held in Konya, Turkey.

Dilara Narin in the women's 81 kg weightlifting category at the 2023 European Weightlifting Championships in Yerevan, Armenia, won bronze with 101 kg in the snatch, 134 kg in the jerk and 235 kg in total, winning 2 silver medals and ranking second in Europe.

She took two bronze medals in the 81 kg category at the 2024 European Weightlifting Championships in Sofia, Bulgaria, one in the Clean & Jerk event and one in total.

== Achievements ==
| Year | Venue | Weight | Snatch (kg) | | | | Clean & Jerk (kg) | | | | Total (kg) | Rank |
| Year | Venue | Weight | 1 | 2 | 3 | Rank | 1 | 2 | 3 | Rank | Total (kg) | Rank |
European Championships
| 2022 | Tirana, Albania | 81 kg | 96 | 99 | ~~102~~ | 4 | 125 | 129 | 133 | 2nd place, silver medalist(s) | 232 | 3rd place, bronze medalist(s) |
| 2023 | Yerevan, Armenia | 81 kg | ~~101~~ | 101 | ~~104~~ | 3rd place, bronze medalist(s) | 130 | 134 | ~~137~~ | 2nd place, silver medalist(s) | 232 | 2nd place, silver medalist(s) |
| 2024 | Sofia, Bulgaria | 81 kg | ~~95~~ | 97 | ~~101~~ | 4 | 125 | ~~128~~ | ~~128~~ | 3rd place, bronze medalist(s) | 222 | 3rd place, bronze medalist(s) |
| 2025 | Chișinău, Moldova | 81 kg | ~~90~~ | ~~90~~ | ~~90~~ | — | — | — | — | — | — | — |
World Junior Championships
| 2019 | Suva, Fiji | 76 kg | ~~90~~ | 90 | 95 | 3rd place, bronze medalist(s) | ~~122~~ | ~~122~~ | 122 | 2nd place, silver medalist(s) | 217 | 2nd place, silver medalist(s) |
| 2022 | Heraklion, Greece | 81 kg | 95 | 99 | ~~102~~ | 2nd place, silver medalist(s) | 125 | 129 | 131 | 1st place, gold medalist(s) | 230 | 1st place, gold medalist(s) |
European Junior Championships
| 2018 | Zamość, Poland | 75 kg | ~~88~~ | 88 | 92 | 3rd place, bronze medalist(s) | 118 | 120 | — | 1st place, gold medalist(s) | 212 | 1st place, gold medalist(s) |
| 2019 | Bucharest, Romania | 76 kg | 91 | 94 | ~~97~~ | 1st place, gold medalist(s) | 115 | 125 | 130 | 1st place, gold medalist(s) | 224 | 1st place, gold medalist(s) |
Youth Olympic Games
| 2018 | Buenos Aires, Argentina | +63 kg | ~~90~~ | ~~90~~ | 92 | 1 | 118 | 121 | 126 | 1 | 218 | 1st place, gold medalist(s) |
