= Nuray Güngör =

Turkish weightlifter (born 2000)

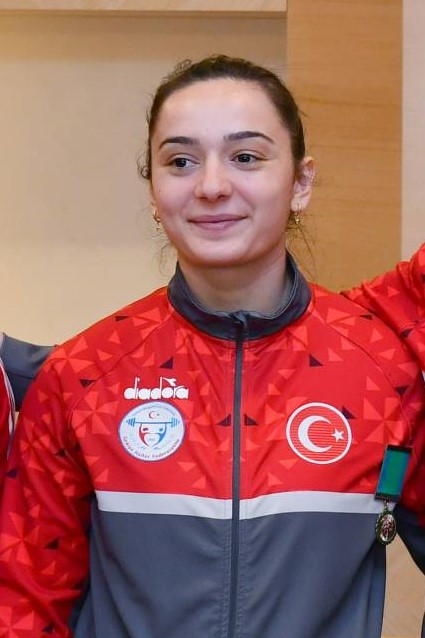

Personal information
- Born: Nuray Levent; 8 May 2000 (age 26) Bolu, Turkey
- Home town: Düzce, Turkey
- Height: 164 cm (5 ft 4 1/2 in)
- Weight: 64 kg (141 lb)

Sport
- Country: Turkey
- Sport: Weightlifting
- Weight class: 64 kg
Medal record
Women's Weightlifting
Representing Turkey
European Championships
Gold medal – first place	2023 Yerevan	64 kg
Silver medal – second place	2022 Tirana	64 kg
Islamic Solidarity Games
Gold medal – first place	2021 Konya	64 kg C&J
Gold medal – first place	2021 Konya	64 kg T
Silver medal – second place	2021 Konya	64 kg S
Silver medal – second place	2025 Riyadh	69 kg C&J
Silver medal – second place	2025 Riyadh	69 kg T
Bronze medal – third place	2025 Riyadh	69 kg S
Mediterranean Games
Gold medal – first place	2018 Tarragona	64 kg C&J
Silver medal – second place	2018 Tarragona	64 kg S
Bronze medal – third place	2026 Taranto	69 kg C&J
European U23 Championships
Gold medal – first place	2021 Rovaniemi	64 kg
World Junior Championships
Bronze medal – third place	2019 Suva	64 kg
European Junior Championships
Silver medal – second place	2019 Bucharest	64 kg

Nuray Güngör (née Levent, born 8 May 2000) is a Turkish weightlifter, who represents Turkey at international competitions.

Born in Bolu, Nuray Levent lives in Düzce, and is a member of the ASP Club there. Levent was the only women's weightlifter representing Turkey at the 2020 Summer Olympics in Tokyo. Nuray Levent married İsa Güngör in 2021.

== Major results ==
Levent competed at the 2016 European Weightlifting Championships.

She competed in the 58 kg division at the 2017 Junior World Weightlifting Championships in Tokyo, Japan, and placed sixth .

She won the bronze medals in snatch, clean & jerk and total of the 64 kg division at the 2019 Junior World Weightlifting Championships held in Suva, Fiji. At the 2019 European Junior & U23 Weightlifting Championships in Bucharest, Romania, she won the silver medal in the snatch and the bronze medal in clean & jerk, and so took the silver medal in the total of 64 kg division.

At the 2021 European Junior & U23 Weightlifting Championships in Rovaniemi, Finland, she captured the gold medal in her weight division.

She took the gold medal in the 64 kg event at the 2022 European Weightlifting Championships held in Tirana, Albania. She won two medals at the 2022 Mediterranean Games held in Oran, Algeria. She won the bronze medal in the Weightlifting at the 2022 Mediterranean Games 71 kg snatch event and the silver medal in the clean & jerk event.

Nuray Güngör won the gold medal in the women's 64 kg category at the 2023 European Weightlifting Championships in Yerevan, Armenia, with 99 kg in the snatch, 120 kg in the jerk and 219 kg in total.

Year	Competition	Venue	Weight	Snatch		Clean & Jerk		Total	
Year	Competition	Venue	Weight	(kg)	Rank	(kg)	Rank	(kg)	Rank
2016	European Championships	Førde, Norway	58 kg	83	12th	101	15th	184	13th
2017	Junior World Championships	Tokyo, Japan	58 kg	87		106		193	6th
2018	Mediterranean Games	Constantí, Spain	63 kg	95	2nd place, silver medalist(s)	116	1st place, gold medalist(s)	—N/a	—N/a
2019	Junior World Championships	Suva, Fiji	64 kg	95	3rd place, bronze medalist(s)	118	3rd place, bronze medalist(s)	213	3rd place, bronze medalist(s)
2019	European Junior Championships	Bucharest, Romania	64 kg	95	2nd place, silver medalist(s)	115	3rd place, bronze medalist(s)	210	2nd place, silver medalist(s)
2021	European U23 Championships	Rovaniemi, Finland	64 kg	96	1st place, gold medalist(s)	118	1st place, gold medalist(s)	214	1st place, gold medalist(s)
2022	European Championships	Tirana, Albania	64 kg	99	2nd place, silver medalist(s)	120	1st place, gold medalist(s)	219	2nd place, silver medalist(s)
2022	Mediterranean Games	Oran, Algeria	71 kg	99	3rd place, bronze medalist(s)	122	2nd place, silver medalist(s)	—N/a	—N/a
2022	Islamic Solidarity Games	Konya, Turkey	64 kg	97	2nd place, silver medalist(s)	121	1st place, gold medalist(s)	218	1st place, gold medalist(s)
2023	European Championships	Yerevan, Armenia	64 kg	99	1st place, gold medalist(s)	120	3rd place, bronze medalist(s)	219	1st place, gold medalist(s)
