= Bartłomiej Adamus =

Polish weightlifter (born 2000)

Personal information
- Born: 12 May 2000 (age 26)

Sport
- Country: Poland
- Sport: Weightlifting
Medal record
Men's weightlifting
Representing Poland
Junior World Weightlifting Championships
Bronze medal – third place	2019 Suva	89 kg
Youth World Weightlifting Championships
Silver medal – second place	2017 Bangkok	85 kg
European Youth Weightlifting Championships
Gold medal – first place	2017 Pristina	85 kg

Bartłomiej Stefan Adamus (born 12 May 2000) is a Polish weightlifter. He represented Poland at the 2020 Summer Olympics in Tokyo, Japan. He competed in the men's 96 kg event.

In 2019, he won the bronze medal in the men's 89 kg event at the Junior World Weightlifting Championships held in Suva, Fiji. At the 2021 European Junior & U23 Weightlifting Championships in Rovaniemi, Finland, he won the bronze medal in his event.
