= Nadezhda Nguen =

Bulgarian weightlifter (born 2000)

Nadezhda-Mey Nguen
Personal information
- Nationality: Bulgarian
- Born: 1 July 2000 (age 25)
- Weight: 45 kg (99 lb)

Sport
- Country: Bulgaria
- Sport: Weightlifting
- Weight class: 45 kg
- Club: TSK Ruse
- Coached by: Ivan Ivanov
Medal record
European Championships
| Gold medal – first place | 2021 Moscow | –45 kg |
European Junior & U23 Weightlifting Championships
| Silver medal – second place | 2021 Rovaniemil | –49 kg |
European Youth Championships
| Silver medal – second place | 2016 Nowy Tomyśl | –48 kg |

Nadezhda-Mey Nguen (Bulgarian: Надежда Нгуен; born 1 July 2000) is a Bulgarian weightlifter, most recently competing in the 45 kg division at the 2021 European Weightlifting Championships.

== Career ==
She won the gold medal at the 2021 European Weightlifting Championships in the 45 kg division.

At the 2021 European Junior & U23 Weightlifting Championships in Rovaniemi, Finland, she won the silver medal in her event.

== Major results ==
| Year | Venue | Weight | Snatch (kg) | | | | Clean & Jerk (kg) | | | | Total | Rank |
| Year | Venue | Weight | 1 | 2 | 3 | Rank | 1 | 2 | 3 | Rank | Total | Rank |
World Championships
| 2022 | Bogotá, Colombia | 45 kg | ~~65~~ | ~~65~~ | 65 | 14 | ~~80~~ | ~~80~~ | 80 | 14 | 145 | 14 |
European Championships
| 2021 | Moscow, Russia | 45 kg | 67 | 70 | 72 | 1st place, gold medalist(s) | ~~85~~ | 83 | ~~85~~ | 4 | 155 | 1st place, gold medalist(s) |
| 2024 | Sofia, Bulgaria | 45 kg | 67 | 69 | ~~71~~ | 3rd place, bronze medalist(s) | ~~80~~ | 80 | ~~86~~ | 7 | 149 | 5 |
European Junior & U23 Weightlifting Championships
| 2021 | Rovaniemi, Finland | 49 kg | ~~67~~ | 67 | 72 | 2nd place, silver medalist(s) | 80 | 85 | ~~89~~ | 2nd place, silver medalist(s) | 157 | (silver) |
European Youth Weightlifting Championships
| 2016 | Nowy Tomyśl, Poland | 48 kg | 63 | 66 | ~~68~~ | 1st place, gold medalist(s) | 78 | 82 | 85 | 2nd place, silver medalist(s) | 151 | 2nd place, silver medalist(s) |
