= 2020 Asian Youth & Junior Weightlifting Championships =

International weightlifting competition

2020 Asian Youth and Junior Weightlifting Championships
- Host city: Tashkent, Uzbekistan
- Dates: 13-19 February
- Main venue: Uzbekistan Sports Complex

The 2020 Asian Youth & Junior Weightlifting Championships were held in Tashkent, Uzbekistan from 13 to 19 February 2020.

== Medal summary ==
=== Junior men's ===
Event	Gold		Silver		Bronze	
55 kg
Snatch	Đỗ Tú Tùng; Vietnam	110 kg YWR	Quan Đắc Trì; Vietnam	105 kg	Ogabek Nafasov; Uzbekistan	104 kg
Clean & Jerk	Đỗ Tú Tùng; Vietnam	136 kg	Albay Auyelkhanov; Kazakhstan	130 kg	Muna Nayak; India	130 kg
Total	Đỗ Tú Tùng; Vietnam	246 kg	Ogabek Nafasov; Uzbekistan	231 kg	Albay Auyelkhanov; Kazakhstan	227 kg
61 kg
Snatch	Muhammad Faathir; Indonesia	119 kg	Siddhanta Gogoi; India	118 kg	Sairamkez Akmolda; Kazakhstan	117 kg
Clean & Jerk	Muhammad Faathir; Indonesia	154 kg YWR	Siddhanta Gogoi; India	151 kg	Sairamkez Akmolda; Kazakhstan	150 kg
Total	Muhammad Faathir; Indonesia	273 kg YWR	Siddhanta Gogoi; India	269 kg	Sairamkez Akmolda; Kazakhstan	267 kg
67 kg
Snatch	Mohammad Yasin; Indonesia	136 kg	Hossein Chinibolagh Pakar; Iran	135 kg	Kim Sung-jin; South Korea	131 kg
Clean & Jerk	Saikhan Taisuyev; Kazakhstan	169 kg	Mohammad Yasin; Indonesia	162 kg	Nawaf Al-Mazyadi; Saudi Arabia	158 kg
Total	Saikhan Taisuyev; Kazakhstan	299 kg	Mohammad Yasin; Indonesia	298 kg	Kim Sung-jin; South Korea	281 kg
73 kg
Snatch	Rahmat Erwin Abdullah; Indonesia	144 kg	Rouhollah Beiralvand; Iran	142 kg	Mirmostafa Javadi; Iran	141 kg
Clean & Jerk	Rahmat Erwin Abdullah; Indonesia	185 kg	Mirmostafa Javadi; Iran	181 kg	Rouhollah Beiralvand; Iran	171 kg
Total	Rahmat Erwin Abdullah; Indonesia	329 kg	Mirmostafa Javadi; Iran	322 kg	Rouhollah Beiralvand; Iran	313 kg
81 kg
Snatch	Mukhammadkodir Toshtemirov; Uzbekistan	161 kg	Sarvarbek Zafarjonov; Uzbekistan	156 kg	Emil Moldodosov; Kyrgyzstan	138 kg
Clean & Jerk	Sarvarbek Zafarjonov; Uzbekistan	188 kg	Mukhammadkodir Toshtemirov; Uzbekistan	182 kg	Yessenkeldi Sapi; Kazakhstan	177 kg
Total	Sarvarbek Zafarjonov; Uzbekistan	344 kg	Mukhammadkodir Toshtemirov; Uzbekistan	343 kg	Yessenkeldi Sapi; Kazakhstan	311 kg
89 kg
Snatch	Nurgissa Adiletuly; Kazakhstan	165 kg	Khakimjon Shamshidinov; Uzbekistan	144 kg	Jeong Yong-hun; South Korea	142 kg
Clean & Jerk	Nurgissa Adiletuly; Kazakhstan	195 kg	Jeong Yong-hun; South Korea	182 kg	Hsieh Meng-en; Chinese Taipei	179 kg
Total	Nurgissa Adiletuly; Kazakhstan	360 kg	Jeong Yong-hun; South Korea	324 kg	Khakimjon Shamshidinov; Uzbekistan	323 kg
96 kg
Snatch	Afshin Taheri Hajivand; Iran	160 kg	Artyom Antropov; Kazakhstan	155 kg	Ezzeddin Al-Ghafeer; Syria	148 kg
Clean & Jerk	Artyom Antropov; Kazakhstan	210 kg	Afshin Taheri Hajivand; Iran	186 kg	Ezzeddin Al-Ghafeer; Syria	185 kg
Total	Artyom Antropov; Kazakhstan	365 kg	Afshin Taheri Hajivand; Iran	346 kg	Ezzeddin Al-Ghafeer; Syria	333 kg
102 kg
Snatch	Rakhat Bekbolat; Kazakhstan	158 kg	Abolfazl Khakpour; Iran	154 kg	Azimjon Khojiev; Uzbekistan	152 kg
Clean & Jerk	Rakhat Bekbolat; Kazakhstan	198 kg YWR	Aleksandr Li; Uzbekistan	189 kg	Abolfazl Khakpour; Iran	188 kg
Total	Rakhat Bekbolat; Kazakhstan	356 kg	Abolfazl Khakpour; Iran	342 kg	Azimjon Khojiev; Uzbekistan	333 kg
109 kg
Snatch	Hwang Sang-un; South Korea	160 kg	Lin Sheng-lun; Chinese Taipei	154 kg	Mirkhosil Mirzabaev; Uzbekistan	153 kg
Clean & Jerk	Hwang Sang-un; South Korea	196 kg	Lin Sheng-lun; Chinese Taipei	190 kg	Mirkhosil Mirzabaev; Uzbekistan	180 kg
Total	Hwang Sang-un; South Korea	356 kg	Lin Sheng-lun; Chinese Taipei	344 kg	Mirkhosil Mirzabaev; Uzbekistan	333 kg
+109 kg
Snatch	Ayat Sharifi; Iran	170 kg	Moayad Al-Najjar; Syria	162 kg	Reza Hassanpour; Iran	161 kg
Clean & Jerk	Reza Hassanpour; Iran	203 kg	Ayat Sharifi; Iran	202 kg	Lee Seung-heon; South Korea	192 kg
Total	Ayat Sharifi; Iran	372 kg	Reza Hassanpour; Iran	364 kg	Moayad Al-Najjar; Syria	353 kg

=== Junior women's ===
Event	Gold		Silver		Bronze	
45 kg
Snatch	Kolli Varalakshmi Pavani Kumari; India	66 kg	Nguyễn Thị Hoài; Vietnam	63 kg	Harshada Garud; India	62 kg
Clean & Jerk	Nguyễn Thị Hoài; Vietnam	86 kg	Kolli Varalakshmi Pavani Kumari; India	79 kg	Harshada Garud; India	77 kg
Total	Nguyễn Thị Hoài; Vietnam	149 kg	Kolli Varalakshmi Pavani Kumari; India	145 kg	Harshada Garud; India	139 kg
49 kg
Snatch	Windy Cantika Aisah; Indonesia	85 kg	Lin Cheng-jing; Chinese Taipei	74 kg	Nanasa Kawasaki; Japan	73 kg
Clean & Jerk	Windy Cantika Aisah; Indonesia	100 kg	Lin Cheng-jing; Chinese Taipei	90 kg	Cao Huyền Thưởng; Vietnam	87 kg
Total	Windy Cantika Aisah; Indonesia	185 kg	Lin Cheng-jing; Chinese Taipei	164 kg	Cao Huyền Thưởng; Vietnam	158 kg
55 kg
Snatch	Nguyễn Thị Thúy Tiền; Vietnam	79 kg	Juliana Klarisa; Indonesia	78 kg	Ananya Patil; India	76 kg
Clean & Jerk	Nguyễn Thị Thúy Tiền; Vietnam	105 kg	Juliana Klarisa; Indonesia	104 kg	Jamila Panfilova; Uzbekistan	93 kg
Total	Nguyễn Thị Thúy Tiền; Vietnam	184 kg	Juliana Klarisa; Indonesia	182 kg	Nigora Abdullaeva; Uzbekistan	168 kg
59 kg
Snatch	Huang Ya-ting; Chinese Taipei	80 kg	Barchinoy Eshqulova; Uzbekistan	79 kg	Putri Aulia Andriani; Indonesia	78 kg
Clean & Jerk	Barchinoy Eshqulova; Uzbekistan	102 kg	Huang Ya-ting; Chinese Taipei	100 kg	Chingkham Nirmala; India	92 kg
Total	Barchinoy Eshqulova; Uzbekistan	181 kg	Huang Ya-ting; Chinese Taipei	180 kg	Chingkham Nirmala; India	164 kg
64 kg
Snatch	Kumushkhon Fayzullaeva; Uzbekistan	92 kg	Tsabitha Alfiah Ramadani; Indonesia	92 kg	Gulnur Ybray; Kazakhstan	88 kg
Clean & Jerk	Kumushkhon Fayzullaeva; Uzbekistan	113 kg	Kim Han-sol; South Korea	112 kg	Gulnur Ybray; Kazakhstan	110 kg
Total	Kumushkhon Fayzullaeva; Uzbekistan	205 kg	Gulnur Ybray; Kazakhstan	198 kg	Kim Han-sol; South Korea	193 kg
71 kg
Snatch	Runa Segawa; Japan	87 kg	Nigora Suvonova; Uzbekistan	86 kg	Merna Hasan; Syria	82 kg
Clean & Jerk	Nigora Suvonova; Uzbekistan	113 kg	Runa Segawa; Japan	111 kg	Merna Hasan; Syria	103 kg
Total	Nigora Suvonova; Uzbekistan	199 kg	Runa Segawa; Japan	198 kg	Merna Hasan; Syria	185 kg
76 kg
Snatch	Tursunoy Jabborova; Uzbekistan	107 kg	Mari Jaghli; Syria	83 kg	Chiu Ching-yi; Chinese Taipei	81 kg
Clean & Jerk	Tursunoy Jabborova; Uzbekistan	123 kg	Mari Jaghli; Syria	105 kg	Pan Yu-ru; Chinese Taipei	97 kg
Total	Tursunoy Jabborova; Uzbekistan	230 kg	Mari Jaghli; Syria	188 kg	Pan Yu-ru; Chinese Taipei	177 kg
81 kg
Snatch	Karina Kuzganbayeva; Kazakhstan	101 kg	Laylohon Hursanova; Uzbekistan	86 kg	Not awarded, lack of entries	
Clean & Jerk	Karina Kuzganbayeva; Kazakhstan	126 kg	Laylohon Hursanova; Uzbekistan	100 kg	Not awarded, lack of entries	
Total	Karina Kuzganbayeva; Kazakhstan	227 kg	Laylohon Hursanova; Uzbekistan	186 kg	Not awarded, lack of entries	
87 kg
Snatch	Dolera Davronova; Uzbekistan	93 kg	Nguyễn Thu Hương; Vietnam	92 kg	Not awarded, lack of entries	
Clean & Jerk	Dolera Davronova; Uzbekistan	120 kg	Nguyễn Thu Hương; Vietnam	100 kg	Not awarded, lack of entries	
Total	Dolera Davronova; Uzbekistan	213 kg	Nguyễn Thu Hương; Vietnam	192 kg	Not awarded, lack of entries	
+87 kg
Snatch	Lee Seon-mi; South Korea	110 kg	Aisamal Sansyzbayeva; Kazakhstan	109 kg	Not awarded, lack of entries	
Clean & Jerk	Aisamal Sansyzbayeva; Kazakhstan	140 kg	Lee Seon-mi; South Korea	120 kg	Not awarded, lack of entries	
Total	Aisamal Sansyzbayeva; Kazakhstan	249 kg	Lee Seon-mi; South Korea	230 kg	Not awarded, lack of entries	

=== Youth men's ===
Event	Gold		Silver		Bronze	
49 kg
Snatch	Khusinboy Matrasulov; Uzbekistan	86 kg	Mukund Aher; India	85 kg	Gurunaidu Senapathi; India	77 kg
Clean & Jerk	Mukund Aher; India	104 kg	Khusinboy Matrasulov; Uzbekistan	102 kg	Gurunaidu Senapathi; India	100 kg
Total	Mukund Aher; India	189 kg	Khusinboy Matrasulov; Uzbekistan	188 kg	Gurunaidu Senapathi; India	177 kg
55 kg
Snatch	Đỗ Tú Tùng; Vietnam	110 kg YWR	Ablay Auyelkhanov; Kazakhstan	97 kg	Kao Chun-chieh; Chinese Taipei	91 kg
Clean & Jerk	Đỗ Tú Tùng; Vietnam	136 kg	Ablay Auyelkhanov; Kazakhstan	130 kg	Golom Tinku; India	122 kg
Total	Đỗ Tú Tùng; Vietnam	246 kg	Ablay Auyelkhanov; Kazakhstan	227 kg	Golom Tinku; India	213 kg
61 kg
Snatch	Muhammad Faathir; Indonesia	119 kg	Sidhanta Gogoi; India	118 kg	Elzar Taiirov; Kyrgyzstan	105 kg
Clean & Jerk	Muhammad Faathir; Indonesia	154 kg YWR	Sidhanta Gogoi; India	151 kg	Elzar Taiirov; Kyrgyzstan	125 kg
Total	Muhammad Faathir; Indonesia	273 kg YWR	Sidhanta Gogoi; India	269 kg	Elzar Taiirov; Kyrgyzstan	230 kg
67 kg
Snatch	Elaman Moldodosov; Kyrgyzstan	103 kg	Not awarded, lack of entries, no mark recorded			
Clean & Jerk	Markio Tario; India	147 kg	Elaman Moldodosov; Kyrgyzstan	123 kg	Not awarded, lack of entries	
Total	Elaman Moldodosov; Kyrgyzstan	226 kg	Not awarded, lack of entries, no mark recorded			
73 kg
Snatch	Rizki Juniansyah; Indonesia	139 kg CYWR	Khojiakbar Olimov; Uzbekistan	126 kg	Pan Jia-you; Chinese Taipei	110 kg
Clean & Jerk	Rizki Juniansyah; Indonesia	168 kg	Khojiakbar Olimov; Uzbekistan	161 kg	Pan Jia-you; Chinese Taipei	135 kg
Total	Rizki Juniansyah; Indonesia	307 kg YWR	Khojiakbar Olimov; Uzbekistan	287 kg	Pan Jia-you; Chinese Taipei	245 kg
81 kg
Snatch	Fazliddin Turaboev; Uzbekistan	133 kg	Valijon Sharipov; Uzbekistan	121 kg	Hsieh Chung-ming; Chinese Taipei	110 kg
Clean & Jerk	Valijon Sharipov; Uzbekistan	157 kg	Fazliddin Turaboev; Uzbekistan	157 kg	Hsieh Chung-ming; Chinese Taipei	140 kg
Total	Fazliddin Turaboev; Uzbekistan	290 kg	Valijon Sharipov; Uzbekistan	278 kg	Hsieh Chung-ming; Chinese Taipei	250 kg
89 kg
Snatch	Qurbonmurod Nomozov; Uzbekistan	133 kg	Mohammad Pourhassan Bagheri; Iran	123 kg	Cheng Chi-wei; Chinese Taipei	120 kg
Clean & Jerk	Qurbonmurod Nomozov; Uzbekistan	166 kg	Cheng Chi-wei; Chinese Taipei	165 kg	Mohammad Pourhassan Bagheri; Iran	161 kg
Total	Qurbonmurod Nomozov; Uzbekistan	299 kg	Cheng Chi-wei; Chinese Taipei	285 kg	Mohammad Pourhassan Bagheri; Iran	284 kg
96 kg
Snatch	Ma Ching-chieh; Chinese Taipei	124 kg	Boburbek Sultonnazirov; Uzbekistan	121 kg	Afzalbek Muzaffarov; Uzbekistan	111 kg
Clean & Jerk	Ma Ching-chieh; Chinese Taipei	153 kg	Boburbek Sultonnazirov; Uzbekistan	152 kg	Afzalbek Muzaffarov; Uzbekistan	145 kg
Total	Ma Ching-chieh; Chinese Taipei	277 kg	Boburbek Sultonnazirov; Uzbekistan	273 kg	Afzalbek Muzaffarov; Uzbekistan	256 kg
102 kg
Snatch	Rakhat Bekbolat; Kazakhstan	158 kg	Hassan Emadi; Iran	146 kg	Doniyor Khamidov; Uzbekistan	131 kg
Clean & Jerk	Rakhat Bekbolat; Kazakhstan	198 kg YWR	Hassan Emadi; Iran	175 kg	Doniyor Khamidov; Uzbekistan	164 kg
Total	Rakhat Bekbolat; Kazakhstan	356 kg	Hassan Emadi; Iran	321 kg	Doniyor Khamidov; Uzbekistan	295 kg
+102 kg
Snatch	Alireza Esfandiari; Iran	145 kg	Amirreza Mohammadiniasamakoush; Iran	137 kg	Weng Zeng-yu; Chinese Taipei	132 kg
Clean & Jerk	Alireza Esfandiari; Iran	180 kg	Amirreza Mohammadiniasamakoush; Iran	165 kg	Weng Zeng-yu; Chinese Taipei	159 kg
Total	Alireza Esfandiari; Iran	325 kg	Amirreza Mohammadiniasamakoush; Iran	302 kg	Weng Zeng-yu; Chinese Taipei	291 kg

=== Youth women's ===
Event	Gold		Silver		Bronze	
40 kg
Snatch	Diyorakhon Turdunova; Uzbekistan	43 kg	Hsiao Wei-chen; Chinese Taipei	40 kg	Not awarded, lack of entries	
Clean & Jerk	Hsiao Wei-chen; Chinese Taipei	54 kg	Diyorakhon Turdunova; Uzbekistan	50 kg	Not awarded, lack of entries	
Total	Hsiao Wei-chen; Chinese Taipei	94 kg	Diyorakhon Turdunova; Uzbekistan	93 kg	Not awarded, lack of entries	
45 kg
Snatch	Kolli Varalakshmi Pavani Kumari; India	66 kg	Nguyễn Thị Hoài; Vietnam	63 kg	Harshada Garud; India	62 kg
Clean & Jerk	Nguyễn Thị Hoài; Vietnam	86 kg	Kolli Varalakshmi Pavani Kumari; India	79 kg	Asadbek Rakhmanov; Uzbekistan	78 kg
Total	Nguyễn Thị Hoài; Vietnam	149 kg	Kolli Varalakshmi Pavani Kumari; India	145 kg	Harshada Garud; India	139 kg
49 kg
Snatch	Sei Higa; Japan	73 kg	Emika Yamashita; Japan	72 kg	Sitora Kupaysinova; Uzbekistan	64 kg
Clean & Jerk	Liao Jia-yi; Chinese Taipei	86 kg	Sei Higa; Japan	86 kg	Emika Yamashita; Japan	85 kg
Total	Sei Higa; Japan	159 kg	Emika Yamashita; Japan	157 kg	Liao Jia-yi; Chinese Taipei	146 kg
55 kg
Snatch	Nigora Abdullaeva; Uzbekistan	75 kg	Jamila Panfilova; Uzbekistan	74 kg	Boni Mangkhya; India	69 kg
Clean & Jerk	Jamila Panfilova; Uzbekistan	94 kg	Nigora Abdullaeva; Uzbekistan	93 kg	Boni Mangkhya; India	93 kg
Total	Nigora Abdullaeva; Uzbekistan	168 kg	Jamila Panfilova; Uzbekistan	168 kg	Boni Mangkhya; India	162 kg
59 kg
Snatch	Djuraeva Madinabonu; Uzbekistan	68 kg	Gao Yu-fang; Chinese Taipei	66 kg	Not awarded, lack of entries	
Clean & Jerk	Djuraeva Madinabonu; Uzbekistan	90 kg	Gao Yu-fang; Chinese Taipei	83 kg	Not awarded, lack of entries	
Total	Djuraeva Madinabonu; Uzbekistan	158 kg	Gao Yu-fang; Chinese Taipei	149 kg	Not awarded, lack of entries	
64 kg
Snatch	Gulnur Ybray; Kazakhstan	88 kg	Lee En-yun; Chinese Taipei	70 kg	Tugs-Erdene Otgonchimeg; Mongolia	67 kg
Clean & Jerk	Gulnur Ybray; Kazakhstan	110 kg	Lee En-yun; Chinese Taipei	91 kg	Mashkhura Rustamova; Uzbekistan	90 kg
Total	Gulnur Ybray; Kazakhstan	198 kg	Lee En-yun; Chinese Taipei	161 kg	Mashkhura Rustamova; Uzbekistan	156 kg
71 kg
Snatch	Runa Segawa; Japan	87 kg	Nigora Suvonova; Uzbekistan	86 kg	Merna Hasan; Syria	82 kg
Clean & Jerk	Nigora Suvonova; Uzbekistan	113 kg	Runa Segawa; Japan	111 kg	Merna Hasan; Syria	103 kg
Total	Nigora Suvonova; Uzbekistan	199 kg	Runa Segawa; Japan	198 kg	Merna Hasan; Syria	185 kg
76 kg
Snatch	Zeng Yun-xuan; Chinese Taipei	70 kg	Not awarded, lack of entries			
Clean & Jerk	Zeng Yun-xuan; Chinese Taipei	95 kg	Not awarded, lack of entries			
Total	Zeng Yun-xuan; Chinese Taipei	165 kg	Not awarded, lack of entries			
81 kg
Snatch	Wen Jia-xin; Chinese Taipei	72 kg	Zebo Mamarajabova; Uzbekistan	68 kg	Sanjana Wedaarachchi; Sri Lanka	65 kg
Clean & Jerk	Wen Jia-xin; Chinese Taipei	91 kg	Zebo Mamarajabova; Uzbekistan	86 kg	Sanjana Wedaarachchi; Sri Lanka	85 kg
Total	Wen Jia-xin; Chinese Taipei	163 kg	Zebo Mamarajabova; Uzbekistan	154 kg	Sanjana Wedaarachchi; Sri Lanka	150 kg
+81 kg
Snatch	Aisamal Sansyzbayeva; Kazakhstan	109 kg	Wang Ling-chen; Chinese Taipei	90 kg	Bayantuul Otgontuya; Mongolia	70 kg
Clean & Jerk	Aisamal Sansyzbayeva; Kazakhstan	140 kg	Wang Ling-chen; Chinese Taipei	125 kg	Bayantuul Otgontuya; Mongolia	85 kg
Total	Aisamal Sansyzbayeva; Kazakhstan	249 kg	Wang Ling-chen; Chinese Taipei	215 kg	Bayantuul Otgontuya; Mongolia	155 kg

== Medal table ==
=== Junior ===
Ranking by Big (Total result) medals

* Host nation (Uzbekistan)

Rank	Nation	Gold	Silver	Bronze	Total
1	Uzbekistan*	6	3	4	13
2	Kazakhstan	6	1	3	10
3	Indonesia	3	2	0	5
4	Vietnam	3	1	1	5
5	Iran	1	4	1	6
6	South Korea	1	2	2	5
7	Chinese Taipei	0	3	1	4
8	India	0	2	2	4
9	Syria	0	1	3	4
10	Japan	0	1	0	1
Totals (10 entries)		20	20	17	57

Ranking by all medals: Big (Total result) and Small (Snatch and Clean & Jerk)

* Host nation (Uzbekistan)

Rank	Nation	Gold	Silver	Bronze	Total
1	Uzbekistan*	16	12	9	37
2	Kazakhstan	15	4	8	27
3	Indonesia	10	6	1	17
4	Vietnam	8	5	2	15
5	Iran	4	10	5	19
6	South Korea	4	4	5	13
7	Chinese Taipei	1	8	4	13
8	India	1	5	7	13
9	Japan	1	2	1	4
10	Syria	0	4	7	11
11	Kyrgyzstan	0	0	1	1
11	Saudi Arabia	0	0	1	1
Totals (12 entries)		60	60	51	171

=== Youth ===
Ranking by Big (Total result) medals

* Host nation (Uzbekistan)

Rank	Nation	Gold	Silver	Bronze	Total
1	Uzbekistan*	5	7	3	15
2	Chinese Taipei	4	4	4	12
3	Kazakhstan	3	1	0	4
4	Indonesia	2	0	0	2
4	Vietnam	2	0	0	2
6	India	1	2	4	7
7	Iran	1	2	1	4
8	Japan	1	2	0	3
9	Kyrgyzstan	1	0	1	2
10	Mongolia	0	0	1	1
10	Sri Lanka	0	0	1	1
10	Syria	0	0	1	1
Totals (12 entries)		20	18	16	54

Ranking by all medals: Big (Total result) and Small (Snatch and Clean & Jerk)

* Host nation (Uzbekistan)

Rank	Nation	Gold	Silver	Bronze	Total
1	Uzbekistan*	16	20	10	46
2	Chinese Taipei	12	12	12	36
3	Kazakhstan	9	3	0	12
4	Indonesia	6	0	0	6
5	Vietnam	5	1	0	6
6	India	4	6	10	20
7	Iran	3	7	2	12
8	Japan	3	5	1	9
9	Kyrgyzstan	2	1	3	6
10	Mongolia	0	0	4	4
11	Sri Lanka	0	0	3	3
11	Syria	0	0	3	3
Totals (12 entries)		60	55	48	163

== Team ranking ==
=== Junior ===
==== Men ====
Rank	Team	Points
1	Uzbekistan	694
2	Iran	641
3	Saudi Arabia	615
4	Kazakhstan	534
5	South Korea	430
6	Chinese Taipei	387

==== Women ====
Rank	Team	Points
1	Uzbekistan	749
2	India	512
3	Chinese Taipei	417
4	Vietnam	367
5	Japan	275
6	Indonesia	251

=== Youth ===
==== Men ====
Rank	Team	Points
1	Uzbekistan	738
2	Chinese Taipei	689
3	India	321
4	Iran	305
5	Kyrgyzstan	367
6	Saudi Arabia	180

==== Women ====
Rank	Team	Points
1	Chinese Taipei	740
2	Uzbekistan	737
3	India	391
4	Japan	297
5	Mongolia	193
6	Kazakhstan	168

== Participating nations ==
=== Junior ===
- Bangladesh (1)
- India (11)
- Indonesia (2)
- Iran (4)
- Japan (4)
- Jordan (1)
- Kazakhstan (4)
- Kyrgyzstan (4)
- Mongolia (3)
- Saudi Arabia (3)
- Sri Lanka (2)
- Syria (1)
- Chinese Taipei (20)
- Uzbekistan (20) Host
- Vietnam (3)

=== Youth ===
- Bangladesh (1)
- India (12)
- Indonesia (6)
- Iran (8)
- Japan (4)
- Jordan (2)
- Kazakhstan (10)
- Kyrgyzstan (7)
- Mongolia (3)
- Palestine (1)
- Saudi Arabia (10)
- South Korea (9)
- Sri Lanka (1)
- Syria (4)
- Chinese Taipei (12)
- Uzbekistan (20) Host
- Vietnam (9)

== Junior men's results ==
=== 55 kg ===
Rank	Athlete	Group	Snatch (kg)				Clean & Jerk (kg)				Total
Rank	Athlete	Group	1	2	3	Rank	1	2	3	Rank	Total
1st place, gold medalist(s)	Đỗ Tú Tùng (VIE)	A	103	106	110	1st place, gold medalist(s)	131	136	~~142~~	1st place, gold medalist(s)	246
2nd place, silver medalist(s)	Ogabek Nafasov (UZB)	A	101	104	~~107~~	3rd place, bronze medalist(s)	119	124	127	4	231
3rd place, bronze medalist(s)	Albay Auyelkhanov (KAZ)	A	94	97	~~100~~	4	125	130	~~135~~	2nd place, silver medalist(s)	227
4	Dahish Mohammed Kulaybi (KSA)	A	75	80	~~87~~	5	95	100	103	5	183
—	Quan Đắc Trì (VIE)	A	102	105	~~107~~	2nd place, silver medalist(s)	~~130~~	~~130~~	~~130~~	—	—
—	Muna Nayak (IND)	A	~~100~~	~~100~~	~~100~~	—	125	130	~~135~~	3rd place, bronze medalist(s)	—

=== 61 kg ===
Rank	Athlete	Group	Snatch (kg)				Clean & Jerk (kg)				Total
Rank	Athlete	Group	1	2	3	Rank	1	2	3	Rank	Total
1st place, gold medalist(s)	Muhammad Faathir (INA)	A	116	119	~~122~~	1st place, gold medalist(s)	146	151	154	1st place, gold medalist(s)	273
2nd place, silver medalist(s)	Sidhanta Gogoi (IND)	A	112	116	118	2nd place, silver medalist(s)	143	146	151	2nd place, silver medalist(s)	269
3rd place, bronze medalist(s)	Sairamkez Akmolda (KAZ)	A	110	114	117	3rd place, bronze medalist(s)	140	145	150	3rd place, bronze medalist(s)	267
4	Nurdiyor Abdukhalilov (UZB)	A	108	113	~~117~~	4	135	~~145~~	~~147~~	4	248
5	Elzar Taiirov (KGZ)	A	100	105	~~107~~	6	117	122	125	6	230
6	Ishimbek Muratbek Uulu (KGZ)	A	95	100	~~104~~	7	128	~~138~~	~~138~~	5	228
7	Mahda Al-Abandi (KSA)	A	85	90	~~96~~	8	105	~~112~~	~~115~~	7	195
—	Lê Nguyễn Quốc Bảo (VIE)	A	~~105~~	106	~~109~~	5	~~125~~	~~125~~	~~125~~	—	—

=== 67 kg ===
Rank	Athlete	Group	Snatch (kg)				Clean & Jerk (kg)				Total
Rank	Athlete	Group	1	2	3	Rank	1	2	3	Rank	Total
1st place, gold medalist(s)	Saikhan Taisuyev (KAZ)	A	125	130	~~135~~	4	165	~~169~~	169	1st place, gold medalist(s)	299
2nd place, silver medalist(s)	Mohammad Yasin (INA)	A	~~132~~	132	136	1st place, gold medalist(s)	157	~~162~~	162	2nd place, silver medalist(s)	298
3rd place, bronze medalist(s)	Kim Sung-jin (KOR)	A	123	126	131	3rd place, bronze medalist(s)	~~150~~	150	~~152~~	4	281
4	Nawaf Al-Mazyadi (KSA)	A	~~123~~	~~123~~	123	5	148	153	158	3rd place, bronze medalist(s)	281
5	Hossein Chinibolagh Pakar (IRI)	A	124	131	135	2nd place, silver medalist(s)	144	~~152~~	~~153~~	6	279
6	Elaman Moldodosov (KGZ)	A	95	100	103	6	115	120	123	7	226
7	Ibrahim Nasser Hussam Sallaj (JOR)	A	87	~~93~~	~~93~~	7	100	106	110	8	197
—	Markio Tario (IND)	A	~~113~~	~~113~~	~~113~~	—	142	147	~~151~~	5	—

=== 73 kg ===
Rank	Athlete	Group	Snatch (kg)				Clean & Jerk (kg)				Total
Rank	Athlete	Group	1	2	3	Rank	1	2	3	Rank	Total
1st place, gold medalist(s)	Rahmat Erwin Abdullah (INA)	A	140	144	~~148~~	1st place, gold medalist(s)	170	180	185	1st place, gold medalist(s)	329
2nd place, silver medalist(s)	Mirmostafa Javadi (IRI)	A	134	~~141~~	141	3rd place, bronze medalist(s)	174	181	~~189~~	2nd place, silver medalist(s)	322
3rd place, bronze medalist(s)	Rouhollah Beiralvand (IRI)	A	134	~~141~~	142	2nd place, silver medalist(s)	166	171	~~178~~	3rd place, bronze medalist(s)	313
4	Rizki Juniansyah (INA)	A	127	132	139	4	160	165	168	4	307
5	Khojiakbar Olimov (UZB)	A	~~126~~	126	~~131~~	5	150	161	~~166~~	5	287
6	Abdullah Al-Marzouq (KSA)	A	105	111	113	7	135	141	~~145~~	6	254
7	Ahmed Al-Hayek (KSA)	A	103	108	112	8	131	~~137~~	~~137~~	7	243
8	Adel Al-Abudy (JOR)	A	100	110	~~115~~	9	130	~~136~~	~~136~~	8	240
—	Lee Young-min (KOR)	A	125	~~129~~	~~129~~	6	~~171~~	~~172~~	~~173~~	—	—
—	Nguyễn Văn Hiếu (VIE)	A	~~135~~	~~135~~	~~137~~	—	~~165~~	~~166~~	~~166~~	—	—

=== 81 kg ===
Rank	Athlete	Group	Snatch (kg)				Clean & Jerk (kg)				Total
Rank	Athlete	Group	1	2	3	Rank	1	2	3	Rank	Total
1st place, gold medalist(s)	Sarvarbek Zafarjonov (UZB)	A	150	156	~~161~~	2nd place, silver medalist(s)	183	~~188~~	188	1st place, gold medalist(s)	344
2nd place, silver medalist(s)	Mukhammadkodir Toshtemirov (UZB)	A	151	157	161	1st place, gold medalist(s)	182	—	—	2nd place, silver medalist(s)	343
3rd place, bronze medalist(s)	Yessenkeldi Sapi (KAZ)	A	130	134	~~137~~	4	170	177	~~183~~	3rd place, bronze medalist(s)	311
4	Mohsan Al-Ismael (KSA)	A	100	105	110	5	125	133	140	4	250
—	Emil Moldodosov (KGZ)	A	~~138~~	138	—	3rd place, bronze medalist(s)	—	—	—	—	—

=== 89 kg ===
Rank	Athlete	Group	Snatch (kg)				Clean & Jerk (kg)				Total
Rank	Athlete	Group	1	2	3	Rank	1	2	3	Rank	Total
1st place, gold medalist(s)	Nurgissa Adiletuly (KAZ)	A	155	160	165	1st place, gold medalist(s)	185	190	195	1st place, gold medalist(s)	360
2nd place, silver medalist(s)	Jeong Yong-hun (KOR)	A	135	~~141~~	142	3rd place, bronze medalist(s)	175	180	182	2nd place, silver medalist(s)	324
3rd place, bronze medalist(s)	Khakimjon Shamshidinov (UZB)	A	141	144	~~147~~	2nd place, silver medalist(s)	170	175	179	4	323
4	Hsieh Meng-en (TPE)	A	140	~~143~~	~~143~~	4	179	~~184~~	~~184~~	3rd place, bronze medalist(s)	319
5	Dong Bing-cheng (TPE)	A	~~138~~	138	~~143~~	6	171	~~176~~	~~176~~	5	309
6	Hossein Biranvand (IRI)	A	~~140~~	~~140~~	140	5	160	~~178~~	~~178~~	6	300
7	Anvar Ysmanov (KGZ)	B	125	~~130~~	130	7	150	157	~~162~~	7	287
8	Kariyawasam Bovithanthri (SRI)	B	110	~~115~~	~~115~~	9	145	155	~~161~~	8	265
9	Mohammed Hamada (PLE)	B	~~120~~	120	~~127~~	8	141	~~146~~	~~151~~	9	261

=== 96 kg ===
Rank	Athlete	Group	Snatch (kg)				Clean & Jerk (kg)				Total
Rank	Athlete	Group	1	2	3	Rank	1	2	3	Rank	Total
1st place, gold medalist(s)	Artyom Antropov (KAZ)	A	145	150	155	2nd place, silver medalist(s)	195	205	210	1st place, gold medalist(s)	365
2nd place, silver medalist(s)	Afshin Taheri Hajivand (IRI)	A	150	156	160	1st place, gold medalist(s)	176	181	186	2nd place, silver medalist(s)	346
3rd place, bronze medalist(s)	Ezzeddin Al-Ghafeer (SYR)	A	142	148	~~155~~	3rd place, bronze medalist(s)	178	~~183~~	185	3rd place, bronze medalist(s)	333
4	Ali Al-Othman (KSA)	A	137	143	~~149~~	4	177	~~182~~	182	4	325
5	Kim Yu-shin (KOR)	A	~~140~~	140	~~145~~	5	170	~~176~~	~~179~~	5	310

=== 102 kg ===
Rank	Athlete	Group	Snatch (kg)				Clean & Jerk (kg)				Total
Rank	Athlete	Group	1	2	3	Rank	1	2	3	Rank	Total
1st place, gold medalist(s)	Rakhat Bekbolat (KAZ)	A	148	153	158	1st place, gold medalist(s)	188	198	~~208~~	1st place, gold medalist(s)	356
2nd place, silver medalist(s)	Abolfazl Khakpour (IRI)	A	145	151	154	2nd place, silver medalist(s)	180	188	~~193~~	3rd place, bronze medalist(s)	342
3rd place, bronze medalist(s)	Azimjon Khojiev (UZB)	A	143	147	152	3rd place, bronze medalist(s)	181	~~194~~	~~194~~	5	333
4	Aleksandr Li (UZB)	A	134	140	~~144~~	6	175	183	189	2nd place, silver medalist(s)	339
5	Tung Ming-chang (TPE)	A	135	141	~~146~~	5	170	176	182	4	323
6	Hassan Emadi (IRI)	A	~~137~~	137	146	4	165	175	~~182~~	6	321
7	Tsai Ching-hua (TPE)	A	130	135	~~140~~	8	~~165~~	165	171	7	306
8	Kim Kyung-hwan (KOR)	A	135	~~143~~	~~144~~	7	~~165~~	165	~~176~~	8	300
9	Kumar Yadav Predeep (IND)	A	125	~~130~~	130	9	155	162	~~166~~	9	292
10	Adisbek Talantbek Uulu (KGZ)	A	110	115	~~120~~	10	135	142	150	10	265

=== 109 kg ===
Rank	Athlete	Group	Snatch (kg)				Clean & Jerk (kg)				Total
Rank	Athlete	Group	1	2	3	Rank	1	2	3	Rank	Total
1st place, gold medalist(s)	Hwang Sang-un (KOR)	A	160	—	—	1st place, gold medalist(s)	196	—	—	1st place, gold medalist(s)	356
2nd place, silver medalist(s)	Lin Sheng-lun (TPE)	A	145	~~150~~	154	2nd place, silver medalist(s)	185	190	~~195~~	2nd place, silver medalist(s)	344
3rd place, bronze medalist(s)	Mirkhosil Mirzabaev (UZB)	A	146	153	~~155~~	3rd place, bronze medalist(s)	171	~~179~~	180	3rd place, bronze medalist(s)	333
4	Ahmed Al-Hamgan (KSA)	A	127	133	~~140~~	4	155	165	~~173~~	4	298
5	Asadbek Rakhmanov (UZB)	A	126	~~131~~	~~133~~	5	145	~~154~~	~~155~~	5	271
6	Bekzhan Nurdinov (KGZ)	A	80	85	~~90~~	6	95	100	105	6	190

=== +109 kg ===
Rank	Athlete	Group	Snatch (kg)				Clean & Jerk (kg)				Total
Rank	Athlete	Group	1	2	3	Rank	1	2	3	Rank	Total
1st place, gold medalist(s)	Ayat Sharifi (IRI)	A	157	165	170	1st place, gold medalist(s)	192	202	~~210~~	2nd place, silver medalist(s)	372
2nd place, silver medalist(s)	Reza Hassanpour (IRI)	A	153	161	~~164~~	3rd place, bronze medalist(s)	195	~~203~~	203	1st place, gold medalist(s)	364
3rd place, bronze medalist(s)	Moayad Al-Najjar (SYR)	A	152	158	162	2nd place, silver medalist(s)	~~191~~	191	~~200~~	4	353
4	Lee Seung-heon (KOR)	A	150	155	~~159~~	4	185	192	~~199~~	3rd place, bronze medalist(s)	347
5	Hsu Chi-chuan (TPE)	A	~~140~~	140	146	5	180	185	~~187~~	5	331
6	Hassan Al-Radhi (KSA)	A	130	137	~~141~~	6	170	178	181	6	318
7	Dawoud Al-Ahmad (KSA)	A	105	110	115	7	127	135	142	7	257

== Junior women's results ==
=== 45 kg ===
Rank	Athlete	Group	Snatch (kg)				Clean & Jerk (kg)				Total
Rank	Athlete	Group	1	2	3	Rank	1	2	3	Rank	Total
1st place, gold medalist(s)	Nguyễn Thị Hoài (VIE)	A	~~63~~	~~63~~	63	2nd place, silver medalist(s)	80	83	86	1st place, gold medalist(s)	149
2nd place, silver medalist(s)	Kolli Varalakshmi Pavani Kumari (IND)	A	61	64	66	1st place, gold medalist(s)	75	79	~~82~~	2nd place, silver medalist(s)	145
3rd place, bronze medalist(s)	Harshada Garud (IND)	A	58	~~62~~	62	3rd place, bronze medalist(s)	73	77	~~79~~	3rd place, bronze medalist(s)	139
4	Nozomi Abe (JPN)	A	~~57~~	57	60	4	70	74	~~78~~	4	134

=== 49 kg ===
Rank	Athlete	Group	Snatch (kg)				Clean & Jerk (kg)				Total
Rank	Athlete	Group	1	2	3	Rank	1	2	3	Rank	Total
1st place, gold medalist(s)	Windy Cantika Aisah (INA)	A	80	85	~~87~~	1st place, gold medalist(s)	100	~~105~~	~~105~~	1st place, gold medalist(s)	185
2nd place, silver medalist(s)	Lin Cheng-jing (TPE)	A	70	74	~~76~~	2nd place, silver medalist(s)	86	90	~~94~~	2nd place, silver medalist(s)	164
3rd place, bronze medalist(s)	Cao Huyền Thưởng (VIE)	A	~~70~~	71	~~74~~	5	~~85~~	85	87	3rd place, bronze medalist(s)	158
4	Nanasa Kawasaki (JPN)	A	~~71~~	71	73	3rd place, bronze medalist(s)	~~84~~	84	~~86~~	5	157
5	Emika Yamashita (JPN)	A	~~70~~	70	72	4	~~85~~	85	~~88~~	4	157
6	Phan Thị Tuyết Ngọc (VIE)	A	~~62~~	62	~~65~~	6	81	~~84~~	~~84~~	6	143
7	Aarati Tatgunti (IND)	A	45	~~50~~	50	8	60	65	~~68~~	7	115
8	Soumya Dalvi (IND)	A	45	50	~~53~~	7	60	~~65~~	65	8	115

=== 55 kg ===
Rank	Athlete	Group	Snatch (kg)				Clean & Jerk (kg)				Total
Rank	Athlete	Group	1	2	3	Rank	1	2	3	Rank	Total
1st place, gold medalist(s)	Nguyễn Thị Thúy Tiền (VIE)	A	79	~~81~~	~~82~~	1st place, gold medalist(s)	98	102	105	1st place, gold medalist(s)	184
2nd place, silver medalist(s)	Juliana Klarisa (INA)	A	75	78	~~80~~	2nd place, silver medalist(s)	97	101	104	2nd place, silver medalist(s)	182
3rd place, bronze medalist(s)	Nigora Abdullaeva (UZB)	A	72	75	~~79~~	4	90	93	~~95~~	4	168
4	Jamila Panfilova (UZB)	A	68	71	74	5	88	92	94	3rd place, bronze medalist(s)	168
5	Ananya Patil (IND)	A	72	76	~~78~~	3rd place, bronze medalist(s)	85	87	~~90~~	6	163
6	Boni Mangkhya (IND)	A	65	~~69~~	69	6	88	~~93~~	93	5	162
7	Marjia Akter (BAN)	A	55	~~60~~	60	7	~~65~~	65	71	7	131

=== 59 kg ===
Rank	Athlete	Group	Snatch (kg)				Clean & Jerk (kg)				Total
Rank	Athlete	Group	1	2	3	Rank	1	2	3	Rank	Total
1st place, gold medalist(s)	Barchinoy Eshqulova (UZB)	A	73	76	79	2nd place, silver medalist(s)	92	97	102	1st place, gold medalist(s)	181
2nd place, silver medalist(s)	Huang Ya-ting (TPE)	A	75	78	80	1st place, gold medalist(s)	95	100	~~103~~	2nd place, silver medalist(s)	180
3rd place, bronze medalist(s)	Chingkham Nirmala (IND)	A	72	~~76~~	~~76~~	4	88	92	~~97~~	3rd place, bronze medalist(s)	164
4	Madinabonu Djuraeva (UZB)	A	65	68	~~72~~	5	80	84	90	4	158
—	Putri Aulia Andriani (INA)	A	75	78	~~80~~	3rd place, bronze medalist(s)	~~97~~	~~97~~	~~97~~	—	—

=== 64 kg ===
Rank	Athlete	Group	Snatch (kg)				Clean & Jerk (kg)				Total
Rank	Athlete	Group	1	2	3	Rank	1	2	3	Rank	Total
1st place, gold medalist(s)	Kumushkhon Fayzullaeva (UZB)	A	92	—	—	1st place, gold medalist(s)	113	—	—	1st place, gold medalist(s)	205
2nd place, silver medalist(s)	Gulnur Ybray (KAZ)	A	83	86	88	3rd place, bronze medalist(s)	~~106~~	106	110	3rd place, bronze medalist(s)	198
3rd place, bronze medalist(s)	Kim Han-sol (KOR)	A	78	~~81~~	81	4	107	~~112~~	112	2nd place, silver medalist(s)	193
4	Tsabitha Alfiah Ramadani (INA)	A	85	92	~~95~~	2nd place, silver medalist(s)	100	~~105~~	~~105~~	4	192
5	Dirdona Meylieva (UZB)	A	75	80	~~84~~	5	~~88~~	88	92	6	172
6	Umeshwori Devi Potshangbam (IND)	A	72	~~75~~	75	6	92	97	~~101~~	5	172

=== 71 kg ===
Rank	Athlete	Group	Snatch (kg)				Clean & Jerk (kg)				Total
Rank	Athlete	Group	1	2	3	Rank	1	2	3	Rank	Total
1st place, gold medalist(s)	Nigora Suvonova (UZB)	A	82	86	~~88~~	2nd place, silver medalist(s)	106	110	113	1st place, gold medalist(s)	199
2nd place, silver medalist(s)	Runa Segawa (JPN)	A	84	87	~~90~~	1st place, gold medalist(s)	104	108	111	2nd place, silver medalist(s)	198
3rd place, bronze medalist(s)	Merna Hasan (SYR)	A	75	~~82~~	82	3rd place, bronze medalist(s)	95	101	103	3rd place, bronze medalist(s)	185
4	Chou Pei-wen (TPE)	A	76	79	~~81~~	4	93	99	101	4	181
5	Hsieh Ya-ling (TPE)	A	~~73~~	73	~~77~~	5	86	91	~~96~~	5	164

=== 76 kg ===
Rank	Athlete	Group	Snatch (kg)				Clean & Jerk (kg)				Total
Rank	Athlete	Group	1	2	3	Rank	1	2	3	Rank	Total
1st place, gold medalist(s)	Tursunoy Jabborova (UZB)	A	97	103	107	1st place, gold medalist(s)	115	123	—	1st place, gold medalist(s)	230
2nd place, silver medalist(s)	Mari Jaghli (SYR)	A	~~75~~	78	83	2nd place, silver medalist(s)	98	103	105	2nd place, silver medalist(s)	188
3rd place, bronze medalist(s)	Pan Yu-ru (TPE)	A	77	80	~~82~~	4	97	~~103~~	~~104~~	3rd place, bronze medalist(s)	177
4	Chiu Ching-yi (TPE)	A	~~77~~	77	81	3rd place, bronze medalist(s)	95	~~100~~	~~101~~	4	176

=== 81 kg ===
Rank	Athlete	Group	Snatch (kg)				Clean & Jerk (kg)				Total
Rank	Athlete	Group	1	2	3	Rank	1	2	3	Rank	Total
1st place, gold medalist(s)	Karina Kuzganbayeva (KAZ)	A	93	97	101	1st place, gold medalist(s)	118	123	126	1st place, gold medalist(s)	227
2nd place, silver medalist(s)	Laylohon Hursanova (UZB)	A	77	82	86	2nd place, silver medalist(s)	95	100	~~104~~	2nd place, silver medalist(s)	186

=== 87 kg ===
Rank	Athlete	Group	Snatch (kg)				Clean & Jerk (kg)				Total
Rank	Athlete	Group	1	2	3	Rank	1	2	3	Rank	Total
1st place, gold medalist(s)	Dolera Davronova (UZB)	A	85	91	93	1st place, gold medalist(s)	115	120	~~123~~	1st place, gold medalist(s)	213
2nd place, silver medalist(s)	Nguyễn Thu Hương (VIE)	A	86	92	~~94~~	2nd place, silver medalist(s)	100	~~117~~	~~117~~	2nd place, silver medalist(s)	192

=== +87 kg ===
Rank	Athlete	Group	Snatch (kg)				Clean & Jerk (kg)				Total
Rank	Athlete	Group	1	2	3	Rank	1	2	3	Rank	Total
1st place, gold medalist(s)	Aisamal Sansyzbayeva (KAZ)	A	100	105	109	2nd place, silver medalist(s)	130	~~138~~	140	1st place, gold medalist(s)	249
2nd place, silver medalist(s)	Lee Seon-mi (KOR)	A	102	108	110	1st place, gold medalist(s)	120	—	—	2nd place, silver medalist(s)	230

== Youth men's results ==
=== 49 kg ===
Rank	Athlete	Group	Snatch (kg)				Clean & Jerk (kg)				Total
Rank	Athlete	Group	1	2	3	Rank	1	2	3	Rank	Total
1st place, gold medalist(s)	Mukund Aher (IND)	A	78	82	85	2nd place, silver medalist(s)	95	101	104	1st place, gold medalist(s)	189
2nd place, silver medalist(s)	Khusinboy Matrasulov (UZB)	A	78	83	86	1st place, gold medalist(s)	96	~~102~~	102	2nd place, silver medalist(s)	188
3rd place, bronze medalist(s)	Gurunaidu Senapathi (IND)	A	77	~~80~~	~~82~~	3rd place, bronze medalist(s)	95	100	~~105~~	3rd place, bronze medalist(s)	177
4	Wei Po-hsuan (TPE)	A	63	68	~~73~~	4	85	~~90~~	~~90~~	4	153
5	Omar Al-Zubi (JOR)	A	67	~~73~~	~~73~~	5	77	~~82~~	~~82~~	5	144
6	Yu Hung-I (TPE)	A	60	~~65~~	~~65~~	6	70	~~77~~	77	6	137

=== 55 kg ===
Rank	Athlete	Group	Snatch (kg)				Clean & Jerk (kg)				Total
Rank	Athlete	Group	1	2	3	Rank	1	2	3	Rank	Total
1st place, gold medalist(s)	Đỗ Tú Tùng (VIE)	A	103	106	110	1st place, gold medalist(s)	131	136	~~142~~	1st place, gold medalist(s)	246
2nd place, silver medalist(s)	Ablay Auyelkhanov (KAZ)	A	94	97	~~100~~	2nd place, silver medalist(s)	125	130	~~135~~	2nd place, silver medalist(s)	227
3rd place, bronze medalist(s)	Golom Tinku (IND)	A	~~87~~	87	91	4	113	118	122	3rd place, bronze medalist(s)	213
4	Kao Chun-chieh (TPE)	A	87	91	~~93~~	3rd place, bronze medalist(s)	~~105~~	105	~~110~~	4	196

=== 61 kg ===
Rank	Athlete	Group	Snatch (kg)				Clean & Jerk (kg)				Total
Rank	Athlete	Group	1	2	3	Rank	1	2	3	Rank	Total
1st place, gold medalist(s)	Muhammad Faathir (INA)	A	116	119	~~122~~	1st place, gold medalist(s)	146	151	154	1st place, gold medalist(s)	273
2nd place, silver medalist(s)	Sidhanta Gogoi (IND)	A	112	116	118	2nd place, silver medalist(s)	143	146	151	2nd place, silver medalist(s)	269
3rd place, bronze medalist(s)	Elzar Taiirov (KGZ)	A	100	105	~~107~~	3rd place, bronze medalist(s)	117	122	125	3rd place, bronze medalist(s)	230
4	Yang Fan-shun (TPE)	A	95	101	~~103~~	4	115	119	~~123~~	4	220
5	Jawad Al-Qaysum (KSA)	A	82	88	92	5	105	118	~~120~~	5	210
6	Kumara Wannipura (SRI)	A	75	80	83	6	103	~~107~~	~~107~~	6	186

=== 67 kg ===
Rank	Athlete	Group	Snatch (kg)				Clean & Jerk (kg)				Total
Rank	Athlete	Group	1	2	3	Rank	1	2	3	Rank	Total
1st place, gold medalist(s)	Elaman Moldodosov (KGZ)	A	95	100	103	1st place, gold medalist(s)	115	120	123	2nd place, silver medalist(s)	226
—	Markio Tario (IND)	A	~~113~~	~~113~~	~~113~~	—	142	147	~~151~~	1st place, gold medalist(s)	—

=== 73 kg ===
Rank	Athlete	Group	Snatch (kg)				Clean & Jerk (kg)				Total
Rank	Athlete	Group	1	2	3	Rank	1	2	3	Rank	Total
1st place, gold medalist(s)	Rizki Juniansyah (INA)	A	127	132	139	1st place, gold medalist(s)	160	165	168	1st place, gold medalist(s)	307
2nd place, silver medalist(s)	Khojiakbar Olimov (UZB)	A	~~126~~	126	~~131~~	2nd place, silver medalist(s)	150	161	~~166~~	2nd place, silver medalist(s)	287
3rd place, bronze medalist(s)	Pan Jia-you (TPE)	A	95	105	110	3rd place, bronze medalist(s)	130	135	~~140~~	3rd place, bronze medalist(s)	245

=== 81 kg ===
Rank	Athlete	Group	Snatch (kg)				Clean & Jerk (kg)				Total
Rank	Athlete	Group	1	2	3	Rank	1	2	3	Rank	Total
1st place, gold medalist(s)	Fazliddin Turaboev (UZB)	A	121	126	133	1st place, gold medalist(s)	150	157	~~165~~	2nd place, silver medalist(s)	290
2nd place, silver medalist(s)	Valijon Sharipov (UZB)	A	~~117~~	117	121	2nd place, silver medalist(s)	146	157	~~161~~	1st place, gold medalist(s)	278
3rd place, bronze medalist(s)	Hsieh Chung-ming (TPE)	A	95	105	110	3rd place, bronze medalist(s)	127	134	140	3rd place, bronze medalist(s)	235

=== 89 kg ===
Rank	Athlete	Group	Snatch (kg)				Clean & Jerk (kg)				Total
Rank	Athlete	Group	1	2	3	Rank	1	2	3	Rank	Total
1st place, gold medalist(s)	Qurbonmurod Nomozov (UZB)	B	124	130	133	1st place, gold medalist(s)	153	162	166	1st place, gold medalist(s)	299
2nd place, silver medalist(s)	Cheng Chi-wei (TPE)	B	~~120~~	120	~~130~~	3rd place, bronze medalist(s)	150	160	165	2nd place, silver medalist(s)	285
3rd place, bronze medalist(s)	Mohammad Pourhassan Bagheri (IRI)	B	123	~~129~~	~~129~~	2nd place, silver medalist(s)	152	161	~~166~~	3rd place, bronze medalist(s)	284

=== 96 kg ===
Rank	Athlete	Group	Snatch (kg)				Clean & Jerk (kg)				Total
Rank	Athlete	Group	1	2	3	Rank	1	2	3	Rank	Total
1st place, gold medalist(s)	Ma Ching-chieh (TPE)	A	115	120	124	1st place, gold medalist(s)	148	153	~~160~~	1st place, gold medalist(s)	277
2nd place, silver medalist(s)	Boburbek Sultonnazirov (UZB)	A	116	121	~~125~~	2nd place, silver medalist(s)	145	152	~~157~~	2nd place, silver medalist(s)	273
3rd place, bronze medalist(s)	Afzalbek Muzaffarov (UZB)	A	105	108	111	3rd place, bronze medalist(s)	135	140	145	3rd place, bronze medalist(s)	256

=== 102 kg ===
Rank	Athlete	Group	Snatch (kg)				Clean & Jerk (kg)				Total
Rank	Athlete	Group	1	2	3	Rank	1	2	3	Rank	Total
1st place, gold medalist(s)	Rakhat Bekbolat (KAZ)	A	148	153	158	1st place, gold medalist(s)	188	198	~~208~~	1st place, gold medalist(s)	356
2nd place, silver medalist(s)	Hassan Emadi (IRI)	A	~~137~~	137	146	2nd place, silver medalist(s)	165	175	~~182~~	2nd place, silver medalist(s)	321
3rd place, bronze medalist(s)	Doniyor Khamidov (UZB)	A	127	131	~~135~~	3rd place, bronze medalist(s)	156	160	164	3rd place, bronze medalist(s)	295
4	Jiang Shao-kao (TPE)	A	120	126	~~130~~	4	150	157	~~161~~	4	283
5	Adisbek Talantbek Uulu (KGZ)	A	110	115	~~120~~	5	135	142	150	5	265

=== +102 kg ===
Rank	Athlete	Group	Snatch (kg)				Clean & Jerk (kg)				Total
Rank	Athlete	Group	1	2	3	Rank	1	2	3	Rank	Total
1st place, gold medalist(s)	Alireza Esfandiari (IRI)	A	136	142	145	1st place, gold medalist(s)	165	174	180	1st place, gold medalist(s)	325
2nd place, silver medalist(s)	Amirreza Mohammadiniasamakoush (IRI)	A	137	~~143~~	~~143~~	2nd place, silver medalist(s)	165	~~175~~	~~175~~	2nd place, silver medalist(s)	302
3rd place, bronze medalist(s)	Weng Zeng-yu (TPE)	A	125	130	132	3rd place, bronze medalist(s)	153	157	159	3rd place, bronze medalist(s)	291
4	Jumaniyoz Avezov (UZB)	A	123	127	131	4	145	156	158	4	289
5	Asadbek Rakhmanov (UZB)	A	126	~~131~~	~~133~~	5	145	~~154~~	~~155~~	5	271
6	Dawoud Al-Ahmad (KSA)	A	105	110	115	6	127	135	142	6	257
7	Turki Saad Al-Yami (KSA)	A	100	106	~~112~~	7	125	130	136	7	242
8	Bekzha Nurdinov (KGZ)	A	80	85	~~90~~	8	95	100	105	8	190

== Youth women's results ==
=== 40 kg ===
Rank	Athlete	Group	Snatch (kg)				Clean & Jerk (kg)				Total
Rank	Athlete	Group	1	2	3	Rank	1	2	3	Rank	Total
1st place, gold medalist(s)	Hsiao Wei-chen (TPE)	A	35	~~40~~	40	2nd place, silver medalist(s)	45	51	54	1st place, gold medalist(s)	94
2nd place, silver medalist(s)	Diyorakhon Turdunova (UZB)	A	40	~~43~~	43	1st place, gold medalist(s)	~~50~~	50	~~53~~	2nd place, silver medalist(s)	93

=== 45 kg ===
Rank	Athlete	Group	Snatch (kg)				Clean & Jerk (kg)				Total
Rank	Athlete	Group	1	2	3	Rank	1	2	3	Rank	Total
1st place, gold medalist(s)	Nguyễn Thị Hoài (VIE)	A	~~63~~	~~63~~	63	2nd place, silver medalist(s)	80	83	86	1st place, gold medalist(s)	149
2nd place, silver medalist(s)	Kolli Varalakshmi Pavani Kumari (IND)	A	61	64	66	1st place, gold medalist(s)	75	79	~~82~~	2nd place, silver medalist(s)	145
3rd place, bronze medalist(s)	Harshada Garud (IND)	A	58	~~62~~	62	3rd place, bronze medalist(s)	73	77	~~79~~	4	139
4	Abe Nozomi (JPN)	A	~~57~~	57	60	4	70	74	~~78~~	5	134
5	Asadbek Rakhmanov (UZB)	A	56	~~60~~	~~61~~	5	73	~~77~~	78	3rd place, bronze medalist(s)	134

=== 49 kg ===
Rank	Athlete	Group	Snatch (kg)				Clean & Jerk (kg)				Total
Rank	Athlete	Group	1	2	3	Rank	1	2	3	Rank	Total
1st place, gold medalist(s)	Sei Higa (JPN)	A	70	~~72~~	73	1st place, gold medalist(s)	82	84	86	2nd place, silver medalist(s)	159
2nd place, silver medalist(s)	Emika Yamashita (JPN)	A	~~70~~	70	72	2nd place, silver medalist(s)	~~85~~	85	~~88~~	3rd place, bronze medalist(s)	157
3rd place, bronze medalist(s)	Liao Jia-yi (TPE)	A	60	~~64~~	~~65~~	6	80	83	86	1st place, gold medalist(s)	146
4	Phan Thị Tuyết Ngọc (VIE)	A	~~62~~	62	~~65~~	4	81	~~84~~	~~84~~	4	143
5	Ozoda Hojieva (UZB)	A	58	61	~~64~~	5	73	78	~~82~~	5	139
6	Sitora Kupaysinova (UZB)	A	58	61	64	3rd place, bronze medalist(s)	72	~~77~~	~~77~~	6	136
7	Aarati Tatgunti (IND)	A	45	~~50~~	50	8	60	65	~~68~~	7	115
8	Soumya Dalvi (IND)	A	45	50	~~53~~	7	60	~~65~~	65	8	115

=== 55 kg ===
Rank	Athlete	Group	Snatch (kg)				Clean & Jerk (kg)				Total
Rank	Athlete	Group	1	2	3	Rank	1	2	3	Rank	Total
1st place, gold medalist(s)	Nigora Abdullaeva (UZB)	A	72	75	~~79~~	1st place, gold medalist(s)	90	93	~~95~~	2nd place, silver medalist(s)	168
2nd place, silver medalist(s)	Jamila Panfilova (UZB)	A	68	71	74	2nd place, silver medalist(s)	88	92	94	1st place, gold medalist(s)	168
3rd place, bronze medalist(s)	Boni Mangkhya (IND)	A	65	~~69~~	69	3rd place, bronze medalist(s)	88	~~93~~	93	3rd place, bronze medalist(s)	162
4	Usha (IND)	A	62	~~65~~	65	5	80	84	89	4	154
5	Hsiao Li-yun (TPE)	A	60	63	65	4	83	~~85~~	~~85~~	5	148
6	Marjia Ekra (BAN)	A	55	~~60~~	60	6	~~65~~	65	71	6	131
7	Enkhzul Uugantsetseg (MGL)	A	45	50	55	7	55	60	~~64~~	7	115

=== 59 kg ===
Rank	Athlete	Group	Snatch (kg)				Clean & Jerk (kg)				Total
Rank	Athlete	Group	1	2	3	Rank	1	2	3	Rank	Total
1st place, gold medalist(s)	Djuraeva Madinabonu (UZB)	A	65	68	~~72~~	1st place, gold medalist(s)	80	84	90	1st place, gold medalist(s)	158
2nd place, silver medalist(s)	Gao Yu-fang (TPE)	A	60	66	~~72~~	2nd place, silver medalist(s)	70	83	~~87~~	2nd place, silver medalist(s)	149

=== 64 kg ===
Rank	Athlete	Group	Snatch (kg)				Clean & Jerk (kg)				Total
Rank	Athlete	Group	1	2	3	Rank	1	2	3	Rank	Total
1st place, gold medalist(s)	Gulnur Ybray (KAZ)	A	83	86	88	1st place, gold medalist(s)	~~106~~	106	110	1st place, gold medalist(s)	198
2nd place, silver medalist(s)	Lee En-yun (TPE)	A	~~65~~	65	70	2nd place, silver medalist(s)	85	89	91	2nd place, silver medalist(s)	161
3rd place, bronze medalist(s)	Mashkhura Rustamova (UZB)	A	62	~~66~~	66	4	84	88	90	3rd place, bronze medalist(s)	156
4	Tugs-Erdene Otgonchimeg (MGL)	A	64	67	~~71~~	3rd place, bronze medalist(s)	82	86	~~89~~	4	153

=== 71 kg ===
Rank	Athlete	Group	Snatch (kg)				Clean & Jerk (kg)				Total
Rank	Athlete	Group	1	2	3	Rank	1	2	3	Rank	Total
1st place, gold medalist(s)	Nigora Suvonova (UZB)	A	82	86	~~88~~	2nd place, silver medalist(s)	106	110	113	1st place, gold medalist(s)	199
2nd place, silver medalist(s)	Runa Segawa (JPN)	A	84	87	~~90~~	1st place, gold medalist(s)	104	108	111	2nd place, silver medalist(s)	198
3rd place, bronze medalist(s)	Merna Hasan (SYR)	A	75	~~82~~	82	3rd place, bronze medalist(s)	95	101	103	3rd place, bronze medalist(s)	185
4	Lu Hsin-tzu (TPE)	A	63	68	~~72~~	4	75	80	~~85~~	4	148

=== 76 kg ===
Rank	Athlete	Group	Snatch (kg)				Clean & Jerk (kg)				Total
Rank	Athlete	Group	1	2	3	Rank	1	2	3	Rank	Total
1st place, gold medalist(s)	Zeng Yun-xuan (TPE)	A	~~70~~	~~70~~	70	1st place, gold medalist(s)	86	95	~~100~~	1st place, gold medalist(s)	165

=== 81 kg ===
Rank	Athlete	Group	Snatch (kg)				Clean & Jerk (kg)				Total
Rank	Athlete	Group	1	2	3	Rank	1	2	3	Rank	Total
1st place, gold medalist(s)	Wen Jia-xin (TPE)	A	66	69	72	1st place, gold medalist(s)	84	91	~~95~~	1st place, gold medalist(s)	163
2nd place, silver medalist(s)	Zebo Mamarajabova (UZB)	A	60	65	68	2nd place, silver medalist(s)	76	86	—	2nd place, silver medalist(s)	154
3rd place, bronze medalist(s)	Sanjana Wedaarachchi (SRI)	A	55	65	~~67~~	3rd place, bronze medalist(s)	75	85	~~90~~	3rd place, bronze medalist(s)	150

=== +81 kg ===
Rank	Athlete	Group	Snatch (kg)				Clean & Jerk (kg)				Total
Rank	Athlete	Group	1	2	3	Rank	1	2	3	Rank	Total
1st place, gold medalist(s)	Aisamal Sansyzbayeva (KAZ)	A	100	105	109	1st place, gold medalist(s)	130	~~138~~	140	1st place, gold medalist(s)	249
2nd place, silver medalist(s)	Wang Ling-chen (TPE)	A	~~90~~	~~90~~	90	2nd place, silver medalist(s)	115	~~125~~	125	2nd place, silver medalist(s)	215
3rd place, bronze medalist(s)	Bayantuul Otgontuya (MGL)	A	64	68	70	3rd place, bronze medalist(s)	80	83	85	3rd place, bronze medalist(s)	155
4	Marjona Norboeva (UZB)	A	65	69	~~71~~	4	81	~~85~~	~~87~~	4	150
