= List of Latvian records in Olympic weightlifting =

The following are the national records in Olympic weightlifting in Latvia. Records are maintained in each weight class for the snatch lift, clean and jerk lift, and the total for both lifts by the Weightlifting Federation of Latvia (Latvijas Svarcelšanas Federācija).

== Current records ==
=== Men ===
Event	Record	Athlete	Date	Meet	Place	Ref
60 kg
Snatch	105 kg	Standard				
Clean & Jerk	125 kg	Standard				
Total	230 kg	Standard				
65 kg
Snatch	110 kg	Standard				
Clean & Jerk	130 kg	Standard				
Total	240 kg	Standard				
70 kg
Snatch	120 kg	Standard				
Clean & Jerk	145 kg	Standard				
Total	265 kg	Standard				
75 kg
Snatch	140 kg	Standard				
Clean & Jerk	180 kg	Standard				
Total	320 kg	Standard				
85 kg
Snatch	150 kg	Standard				
Clean & Jerk	190 kg	Standard				
Total	340 kg	Standard				
95 kg
Snatch	156 kg	Armands Mežinskis	26 September 2026	Blue Swords Cup	Meissen, Germany	
Snatch	161 kg	Armands Mežinskis	4 November 2026	World Championships	Ningbo, China	
Clean & Jerk	195 kg	Standard				
Total	350 kg	Standard				
Total	353 kg	Armands Mežinskis	4 November 2026	World Championships	Ningbo, China	
110 kg
Snatch	165 kg	Standard				
Clean & Jerk	205 kg	Standard				
Total	370 kg	Standard				
+110 kg
Snatch	170 kg	Standard				
Clean & Jerk	210 kg	Standard				
Total	380 kg	Standard				

=== Women ===
Event	Record	Athlete	Date	Meet	Place	Ref
49 kg
Snatch	62 kg	Standard				
Clean & Jerk	83 kg	Standard				
Total	145 kg	Standard				
53 kg
Snatch	70 kg	Standard				
Clean & Jerk	85 kg	Standard				
Total	155 kg	Standard				
57 kg
Snatch	75 kg	Standard				
Clean & Jerk	95 kg	Standard				
Total	170 kg	Standard				
61 kg
Snatch	96 kg	Rebeka Ibrahima	26 September 2026	Blue Swords Cup	Meissen, Germany	
Clean & Jerk	110 kg	Rebeka Ibrahima	26 September 2026	Blue Swords Cup	Meissen, Germany	
Clean & Jerk	115 kg	Rebeka Ibrahima	1 November 2026	World Championships	Ningbo, China	
Total	206 kg	Rebeka Ibrahima	26 September 2026	Blue Swords Cup	Meissen, Germany	
Total	211 kg	Rebeka Ibrahima	1 November 2026	World Championships	Ningbo, China	
69 kg
Snatch	87 kg	Standard				
Clean & Jerk	108 kg	Standard				
Total	195 kg	Standard				
77 kg
Snatch	92 kg	Standard				
Clean & Jerk	113 kg	Standard				
Total	205 kg	Standard				
86 kg
Snatch	97 kg	Standard				
Clean & Jerk	118 kg	Standard				
Total	215 kg	Standard				
+86 kg
Snatch	100 kg	Standard				
Clean & Jerk	120 kg	Standard				
Total	220 kg	Standard				

== Historical records ==
=== Men (2025–2026) ===
Event	Record	Athlete	Date	Meet	Place	Ref
60 kg
Snatch	105 kg	Standard				
Clean & Jerk	125 kg	Standard				
Total	230 kg	Standard				
65 kg
Snatch	110 kg	Standard				
Clean & Jerk	130 kg	Standard				
Total	240 kg	Standard				
71 kg
Snatch	120 kg	Standard				
Clean & Jerk	145 kg	Standard				
Total	265 kg	Standard				
79 kg
Snatch	150 kg	Ritvars Suharevs	6 October 2025	World Championships	Førde, Norway	
Clean & Jerk	184 kg	Ritvars Suharevs	6 October 2025	World Championships	Førde, Norway	
Total	334 kg	Ritvars Suharevs	6 October 2025	World Championships	Førde, Norway	
88 kg
Snatch	155 kg	Artūrs Vasiļonoks	23 April 2026	European Championships	Batumi, Georgia	
Clean & Jerk	190 kg	Standard				
Total	358 kg	Standard				
94 kg
Snatch	158 kg	Armands Mežinskis	24 April 2026	European Championships	Batumi, Georgia	
Clean & Jerk	195 kg	Standard				
Total	351 kg	Armands Mežinskis	24 April 2026	European Championships	Batumi, Georgia	
110 kg
Snatch	170 kg	Artūrs Plēsnieks	10 October 2025	World Championships	Førde, Norway	
Clean & Jerk	209 kg	Artūrs Plēsnieks	10 October 2025	World Championships	Førde, Norway	
Total	379 kg	Artūrs Plēsnieks	10 October 2025	World Championships	Førde, Norway	
+110 kg
Snatch	170 kg	Standard				
Clean & Jerk	210 kg	Standard				
Total	380 kg	Standard				

=== Men (2018–2025) ===
Event	Record	Athlete	Date	Meet	Place	Ref
55 kg
Snatch	90 kg	Standard				
Clean & Jerk	110 kg	Standard				
Total	200 kg	Standard				
61 kg
Snatch	105 kg	Standard				
Clean & Jerk	125 kg	Standard				
Total	230 kg	Standard				
67 kg
Snatch	120 kg	Standard				
Clean & Jerk	150 kg	Standard				
Total	270 kg	Standard				
73 kg
Snatch	156 kg	Ritvars Suharevs	7 December 2023	IWF Grand Prix	Doha, Qatar	
Snatch	157 kg	Ritvars Suharevs	4 April 2024	World Cup	Phuket, Thailand	
Clean & Jerk	185 kg	Ritvars Suharevs	7 December 2023	IWF Grand Prix	Doha, Qatar	
Total	341 kg	Ritvars Suharevs	7 December 2023	IWF Grand Prix	Doha, Qatar	
81 kg
Snatch	163 kg	Ritvars Suharevs	31 July 2021	Olympic Games	Tokyo, Japan	
Clean & Jerk	197 kg	Ritvars Suharevs	7 November 2020		Helsinki, Finland	
Total	358 kg	Ritvars Suharevs	31 July 2021	Olympic Games	Tokyo, Japan	
89 kg
Snatch	166 kg	Ritvars Suharevs	12 September 2020		Dobele, Latvia	
Clean & Jerk	203 kg	Armands Mežinskis	10 December 2023	IWF Grand Prix	Doha, Qatar	
Total	365 kg	Ritvars Suharevs	12 September 2020		Dobele, Latvia	
96 kg
Snatch	164 kg	Vadims Koževņikovs	10 August 2019		Tartu, Estonia	
Clean & Jerk	208 kg	Vadims Koževņikovs	10 August 2019		Tartu, Estonia	
Total	372 kg	Vadims Koževņikovs	10 August 2019		Tartu, Estonia	
102 kg
Snatch	173 kg	Artūrs Plēsnieks	14 September 2023	World Championships	Riyadh, Saudi Arabia	
Clean & Jerk	208 kg	Artūrs Plēsnieks	13 December 2022	World Championships	Bogotá, Colombia	
Total	381 kg	Artūrs Plēsnieks	14 September 2023	World Championships	Riyadh, Saudi Arabia	
109 kg
Snatch	181 kg	Artūrs Plēsnieks	4 March 2019	Fajr Cup	Tehran, Iran	
Clean & Jerk	230 kg	Artūrs Plēsnieks	3 August 2021	Olympic Games	Tokyo, Japan	
Total	410 kg	Artūrs Plēsnieks	3 August 2021	Olympic Games	Tokyo, Japan	
+109 kg
Snatch	168 kg	Artūrs Plēsnieks	1 May 2021	Latvian Championships	Dobele, Latvia	
Clean & Jerk	220 kg	Artūrs Plēsnieks	1 May 2021	Latvian Championships	Dobele, Latvia	
Total	388 kg	Artūrs Plēsnieks	1 May 2021	Latvian Championships	Dobele, Latvia	

=== Women (2025–2026) ===
Event	Record	Athlete	Date	Meet	Place	Ref
48 kg
Snatch	62 kg	Standard				
Clean & Jerk	83 kg	Standard				
Total	145 kg	Standard				
53 kg
Snatch	70 kg	Standard				
Clean & Jerk	85 kg	Standard				
Total	155 kg	Standard				
58 kg
Snatch	75 kg	Standard				
Clean & Jerk	95 kg	Standard				
Total	170 kg	Standard				
63 kg
Snatch	83 kg	Standard				
Clean & Jerk	102 kg	Standard				
Total	185 kg	Standard				
69 kg
Snatch	87 kg	Standard				
Clean & Jerk	108 kg	Standard				
Total	195 kg	Standard				
77 kg
Snatch	92 kg	Standard				
Clean & Jerk	113 kg	Standard				
Total	205 kg	Standard				
86 kg
Snatch	97 kg	Standard				
Clean & Jerk	118 kg	Standard				
Total	215 kg	Standard				
+86 kg
Snatch	100 kg	Standard				
Clean & Jerk	120 kg	Standard				
Total	220 kg	Standard				

=== Women (2018–2025) ===
Event	Record	Athlete	Date	Meet	Place	Ref
45 kg
Snatch	68 kg	Standard				
Clean & Jerk	77 kg	Standard				
Total	145 kg	Standard				
49 kg
Snatch	73 kg	Standard				
Clean & Jerk	82 kg	Standard				
Total	155 kg	Standard				
55 kg
Snatch	74 kg	Standard				
Clean & Jerk	94 kg	Standard				
Total	168 kg	Standard				
59 kg
Snatch	103 kg	Rebeka Koha	4 November 2018	World Championships	Ashgabat, Turkmenistan	
Clean & Jerk	124 kg	Rebeka Koha	4 November 2018	World Championships	Ashgabat, Turkmenistan	
Total	227 kg	Rebeka Koha	4 November 2018	World Championships	Ashgabat, Turkmenistan	
64 kg
Snatch	104 kg	Rebeka Koha	7 March 2020		Ventspils, Latvia	
Clean & Jerk	123 kg	Rebeka Koha	7 March 2020		Ventspils, Latvia	
Total	227 kg	Rebeka Koha	7 March 2020		Ventspils, Latvia	
71 kg
Snatch	93 kg	Daniela Ivanova	31 July 2023	European U23 Championships	Bucharest, Romania	
Clean & Jerk	118 kg	Daniela Ivanova	17 June 2023		Ventspils, Latvia	
Total	211 kg	Daniela Ivanova	31 July 2023	European U23 Championships	Bucharest, Romania	
76 kg
Snatch	98 kg	Daniela Ivanova	4 March 2023	Latvian Championships	Ventspils, Latvia	
Clean & Jerk	127 kg	Daniela Ivanova	7 May 2022	Junior World Championships	Heraklion, Greece	
Total	222 kg	Daniela Ivanova	7 May 2022	Junior World Championships	Heraklion, Greece	
81 kg
Snatch	95 kg	Standard				
Clean & Jerk	115 kg	Standard				
Total	210 kg	Standard				
87 kg
Snatch	97 kg	Standard				
Clean & Jerk	118 kg	Standard				
Total	215 kg	Standard				
+87 kg
Snatch	102 kg	Standard				
Clean & Jerk	123 kg	Standard				
Total	225 kg	Standard				
