= Garud =

Garud may refer to:

- Garuda, a Buddhist deity
- Harshada Garud (born 2003), Indian weightlifter
