= Luis Quiñones (weightlifter) =

Colombian weightlifter (born 2001)

Personal information
- Full name: Luis Miguel Quiñones
- Born: 3 January 2001 (age 25) Cali, Colombia

Sport
- Country: Colombia
- Sport: Weightlifting
- Weight class: 94 kg; +102 kg; 109 kg; +109 kg
Medal record
Men's weightlifting
Representing Colombia
South American Games
Silver medal – second place	2022 Asunción	+109 kg
Bolivarian Games
Silver medal – second place	2025 Lima-Ayacucho	94 kg CJ
Bronze medal – third place	2025 Lima-Ayacucho	94 kg S
Junior Pan American Games
Gold medal – first place	2021 Cali-Valle	109 kg

Luis Miguel Quiñones (born 3 January 2001) is a Colombian weightlifter. He won the silver medal in the men's +109 kg event at the 2022 South American Games held in Asunción, Paraguay.

Quiñones won the gold medal in the men's 109 kg event at the 2021 Junior Pan American Games held in Colombia. He competed in the men's +102 kg event at the 2023 Pan American Games held in Santiago, Chile.

== Achievements ==
Year	Venue	Weight	Snatch (kg)				Clean & Jerk (kg)				Total	Rank
Year	Venue	Weight	1	2	3	Rank	1	2	3	Rank	Total	Rank
Representing Colombia
Pan American Games
2023	Santiago, Chile	+102 kg	153	160	~~163~~	—N/a	~~200~~	200	–	—N/a	360	7
South American Games
2022	Asunción, Paraguay	+109 kg	150	~~157~~	160	—N/a	195	200	~~205~~	—N/a	360	2nd place, silver medalist(s)
Bolivarian Games
2025	Lima, Peru	94 kg	158	~~163~~	165	3rd place, bronze medalist(s)	~~200~~	202	~~210~~	2nd place, silver medalist(s)	—N/a	—N/a
Junior Pan American Games
2021	Cali, Colombia	109 kg	~~150~~	150	155	—N/a	190	201	—	—N/a	356	1st place, gold medalist(s)
