= Ryan Grimsland =

American weightlifter (born 2002)

Personal information
- Born: April 3, 2002 (age 24)

Sport
- Country: United States
- Sport: Weightlifting
- Weight class: 73 kg
Medal record
Men's weightlifting
Representing United States
IWF Grand Prix
Gold medal – first place	2023 Havana	73 kg
Pan American Championships
Silver medal – second place	2023 Bariloche	73 kg
Junior World Championships
Bronze medal – third place	2022 Heraklion	73 kg
Junior Pan American Games
Gold medal – first place	2021 Cali-Valle	67 kg

Ryan Henry Grimsland (born April 3, 2002) is an American weightlifter. He won the silver medal in the men's 73 kg event at the 2023 Pan American Weightlifting Championships held in Bariloche, Argentina. He won the gold medal in men's 61 kg event at the 2021 Junior Pan American Games held in Colombia.

Grimsland won the bronze medal in his event at the 2022 Junior World Weightlifting Championships held in Heraklion, Greece.

== Achievements ==
Year	Venue	Weight	Snatch (kg)				Clean & Jerk (kg)				Total	Rank
Year	Venue	Weight	1	2	3	Rank	1	2	3	Rank	Total	Rank
World Weightlifting Championships
2026	Ningbo, China	75 kg	145	149	~~152~~	18	185	~~189~~	~~190~~	10	334	11
Pan American Championships
2023	Bariloche, Argentina	73 kg	132	137	141	2nd place, silver medalist(s)	176	182	~~186~~	2nd place, silver medalist(s)	323	2nd place, silver medalist(s)
