= 2022 Junior World Weightlifting Championships =

- Venue: Heraklion Indoor Sports Arena
- Location: Heraklion, Greece
- Dates: 2–10 May
- Competitors: 304 from 61 nations

The 2022 Junior World Weightlifting Championships were held in Heraklion, Greece, from 2 to 10 May 2022.

== Medal table ==
Ranking by Big (Total result) medals

* Host nation (Greece)

Rank	Nation	Gold	Silver	Bronze	Total
1	Turkey	2	3	1	6
2	Armenia	2	2	1	5
3	Ukraine	2	1	1	4
3	Uzbekistan	2	1	1	4
5	Indonesia	2	0	0	2
6	Mexico	1	3	1	5
7	United States	1	2	2	5
8	Egypt	1	1	3	5
9	India	1	1	1	3
10	South Korea	1	1	0	2
11	Colombia	1	0	3	4
12	Thailand	1	0	1	2
13	Belgium	1	0	0	1
13	Ecuador	1	0	0	1
13	Iran	1	0	0	1
16	Kazakhstan	0	1	1	2
16	Moldova	0	1	1	2
18	Cuba	0	1	0	1
18	Iraq	0	1	0	1
18	Latvia	0	1	0	1
21	France	0	0	1	1
21	Georgia	0	0	1	1
21	Palestine	0	0	1	1
Totals (23 entries)		20	20	20	60

Ranking by all medals: Big (Total result) and Small (Snatch and Clean & Jerk)

* Host nation (Greece)

Rank	Nation	Gold	Silver	Bronze	Total
1	Turkey	7	5	7	19
2	Indonesia	6	0	1	7
3	Uzbekistan	5	5	2	12
4	Armenia	5	4	5	14
5	Ukraine	5	3	5	13
6	United States	4	4	5	13
7	Egypt	4	3	6	13
8	Mexico	3	7	5	15
9	Colombia	3	3	5	11
10	South Korea	3	2	2	7
11	Iran	3	1	0	4
12	Ecuador	3	0	1	4
13	Belgium	3	0	0	3
14	India	2	4	2	8
15	Thailand	2	3	1	6
16	Georgia	1	0	1	2
16	Palestine	1	0	1	2
18	Kazakhstan	0	5	2	7
19	Moldova	0	3	3	6
20	Cuba	0	2	0	2
20	Iraq	0	2	0	2
20	Latvia	0	2	0	2
23	Italy	0	1	0	1
23	Spain	0	1	0	1
25	France	0	0	2	2
26	Albania	0	0	1	1
26	Germany	0	0	1	1
26	Morocco	0	0	1	1
26	Turkmenistan	0	0	1	1
Totals (29 entries)		60	60	60	180

== Medalists ==
=== Men ===
Event	Gold		Silver		Bronze	
55 kg
Snatch	Garnik Cholakyan; Armenia	108 kg	Jostyn Torralvo; Colombia	103 kg	José Poox; Mexico	103 kg
Clean & Jerk	Garnik Cholakyan; Armenia	132 kg	José Poox; Mexico	131 kg	Mustafa Erdoğan; Turkey	127 kg
Total	Garnik Cholakyan; Armenia	240 kg	José Poox; Mexico	234 kg	Mustafa Erdoğan; Turkey	228 kg
61 kg
Snatch	Kaan Kahriman; Turkey	126 kg	Sergio Massidda; Italy	125 kg	Daniel Caicedo; Colombia	121 kg
Clean & Jerk	Hampton Morris; United States	160 kg JWR	Daniel Caicedo; Colombia	146 kg	Cho Min-jae; South Korea	145 kg
Total	Hampton Morris; United States	276 kg	Kaan Kahriman; Turkey	269 kg	Daniel Caicedo; Colombia	267 kg
67 kg
Snatch	Weeraphon Wichuma; Thailand	140 kg	Gor Sahakyan; Armenia	137 kg	Yusuf Fehmi Genç; Turkey	136 kg
Clean & Jerk	Yusuf Fehmi Genç; Turkey	171 kg	Weeraphon Wichuma; Thailand	171 kg	Gor Sahakyan; Armenia	165 kg
Total	Weeraphon Wichuma; Thailand	311 kg	Yusuf Fehmi Genç; Turkey	307 kg	Gor Sahakyan; Armenia	302 kg
73 kg
Snatch	Rizki Juniansyah; Indonesia	156 kg JWR	Alexey Churkin; Kazakhstan	146 kg	Ryan Grimsland; United States	145 kg
Clean & Jerk	Rizki Juniansyah; Indonesia	185 kg	Alexey Churkin; Kazakhstan	183 kg	Ryan Grimsland; United States	182 kg
Total	Rizki Juniansyah; Indonesia	341 kg	Alexey Churkin; Kazakhstan	329 kg	Ryan Grimsland; United States	327 kg
81 kg
Snatch	Hakan Şükrü Kurnaz; Turkey	150 kg	Yegor Sherer; Kazakhstan	149 kg	Ertjan Kofsha; Albania	146 kg
Clean & Jerk	Saba Asanidze; Georgia	183 kg	Mahmoud Hosny Elsayed; Egypt	182 kg	Denis Poluboyarinov; Kazakhstan	181 kg
Total	Hakan Şükrü Kurnaz; Turkey	324 kg	Mahmoud Hosny Elsayed; Egypt	324 kg	Saba Asanidze; Georgia	324 kg
89 kg
Snatch	Mohamed Gamal; Egypt	156 kg	Maksym Dombrovskyi; Ukraine	155 kg	Suren Grigoryan; Armenia	155 kg
Clean & Jerk	Maksym Dombrovskyi; Ukraine	190 kg	Khojiakbar Olimov; Uzbekistan	188 kg	Suren Grigoryan; Armenia	185 kg
Total	Maksym Dombrovskyi; Ukraine	345 kg	Suren Grigoryan; Armenia	340 kg	Mohamed Gamal; Egypt	339 kg
96 kg
Snatch	Garik Karapetyan; Armenia	170 kg	Tudor Bratu; Moldova	163 kg	Yasser Usama Hemdan; Egypt	157 kg
Clean & Jerk	Yasser Usama Hemdan; Egypt	202 kg	Tudor Bratu; Moldova	201 kg	Garik Karapetyan; Armenia	200 kg
Total	Garik Karapetyan; Armenia	370 kg	Tudor Bratu; Moldova	364 kg	Yasser Usama Hemdan; Egypt	359 kg
102 kg
Snatch	Mohammed Hamada (PLE)	168 kg	Sharofiddin Amriddinov (UZB)	168 kg	Mykyta Rubanovskyi (UKR)	163 kg
Clean & Jerk	Sharofiddin Amriddinov (UZB)	204 kg	Petros Petrosyan (ARM)	202 kg	Mykyta Rubanovskyi (UKR)	195 kg
Total	Sharofiddin Amriddinov (UZB)	372 kg	Petros Petrosyan (ARM)	363 kg	Mohammed Hamada (PLE)	361 kg
109 kg
Snatch	Bohdan Hoza (UKR)	195 kg JWR	Ammar Rubaiawi (IRQ)	168 kg	Lee Seung-hoon (KOR)	162 kg
Clean & Jerk	Bohdan Hoza (UKR)	215 kg	Onur Demirci (TUR)	196 kg	Arley Bonilla (COL)	195 kg
Total	Bohdan Hoza (UKR)	410 kg	Ammar Rubaiawi (IRQ)	359 kg	Arley Bonilla (COL)	355 kg
+109 kg
Snatch	Alireza Yousefi (IRI)	177 kg	Mirkhosil Mirzabaev (UZB)	176 kg	Bohdan Taranenko (UKR)	167 kg
Clean & Jerk	Alireza Yousefi (IRI)	239 kg JWR	Mirkhosil Mirzabaev (UZB)	212 kg	Atajan Daýyýew (TKM)	208 kg
Total	Alireza Yousefi (IRI)	416 kg	Mirkhosil Mirzabaev (UZB)	388 kg	Bohdan Taranenko (UKR)	374 kg

=== Women ===
Event	Gold		Silver		Bronze	
45 kg
Snatch	Harshada Sharad Garud; India	70 kg	Marta García; Spain	68 kg	Teodora-Luminița Hîncu; Moldova	67 kg
Clean & Jerk	Cansu Bektaş; Turkey	85 kg	Harshada Sharad Garud; India	83 kg	Teodora-Luminița Hîncu; Moldova	82 kg
Total	Harshada Sharad Garud; India	153 kg	Cansu Bektaş; Turkey	150 kg	Teodora-Luminița Hîncu; Moldova	149 kg
49 kg
Snatch	Windy Cantika Aisah; Indonesia	83 kg	Gyaneshwari Yadav; India	73 kg	V Rithika; India	69 kg
Clean & Jerk	Windy Cantika Aisah; Indonesia	102 kg	Gyaneshwari Yadav; India	83 kg	Maha Fajreslam; Morocco	82 kg
Total	Windy Cantika Aisah; Indonesia	185 kg	Gyaneshwari Yadav; India	156 kg	V Rithika; India	150 kg
55 kg
Snatch	Nina Sterckx; Belgium	93 kg	Svitlana Samuliak; Ukraine	89 kg	Jamila Panfilova; Uzbekistan	86 kg
Clean & Jerk	Nina Sterckx; Belgium	111 kg	Leila Cook; United States	106 kg	Juliana Klarisa; Indonesia	103 kg
Total	Nina Sterckx; Belgium	204 kg	Svitlana Samuliak; Ukraine	192 kg	Jamila Panfilova; Uzbekistan	186 kg
59 kg
Snatch	Katharine Estep; United States	91 kg	Karen Mosquera; Colombia	90 kg	Alina Zakharchenko; Ukraine	90 kg
Clean & Jerk	Daphne Guillén; Mexico	114 kg	Suratwadee Yodsarn; Thailand	113 kg	Jenifer Becerra; Ecuador	111 kg
Total	Daphne Guillén; Mexico	203 kg	Katharine Estep; United States	200 kg	Karen Mosquera; Colombia	199 kg
64 kg
Snatch	Julieth Rodríguez; Colombia	97 kg	Queysi Rojas; Mexico	96 kg	Antonia Ackermann; Germany	91 kg
Clean & Jerk	Julieth Rodríguez; Colombia	124 kg	Queysi Rojas; Mexico	119 kg	Marie Mantaropoulos; France	114 kg
Total	Julieth Rodríguez; Colombia	221 kg	Queysi Rojas; Mexico	215 kg	Marie Mantaropoulos; France	204 kg
71 kg
Snatch	Olivia Reeves; United States	107 kg	Neama Said; Egypt	106 kg	Aysel Özkan; Turkey	101 kg
Clean & Jerk	Neama Said; Egypt	131 kg	Olivia Reeves; United States	129 kg	Mariana García; Mexico	127 kg
Total	Neama Said; Egypt	237 kg	Olivia Reeves; United States	236 kg	Mariana García; Mexico	222 kg
76 kg
Snatch	Bella Paredes; Ecuador	104 kg	Duangkamon Khongthong; Thailand	97 kg	Dilara Uçan; Turkey	96 kg
Clean & Jerk	Bella Paredes; Ecuador	131 kg	Daniela Ivanova; Latvia	127 kg	Dilara Uçan; Turkey	125 kg
Total	Bella Paredes; Ecuador	235 kg	Daniela Ivanova; Latvia	222 kg	Duangkamon Khongthong; Thailand	221 kg
81 kg
Snatch	Emmy González; Mexico	100 kg	Dilara Narin; Turkey	99 kg	Fatma Ahmed; Egypt	99 kg
Clean & Jerk	Dilara Narin; Turkey	131 kg	Emmy González; Mexico	127 kg	Fatma Ahmed; Egypt	122 kg
Total	Dilara Narin; Turkey	230 kg	Emmy González; Mexico	227 kg	Fatma Ahmed; Egypt	221 kg
87 kg
Snatch	Tursunoy Jabborova; Uzbekistan	109 kg	Yekta Jamali; Iran	100 kg	Amanda Robles; United States	100 kg
Clean & Jerk	Tursunoy Jabborova; Uzbekistan	129 kg	Elizabeth Reyes; Cuba	127 kg	Sara Yenigün; Turkey	127 kg
Total	Tursunoy Jabborova; Uzbekistan	238 kg	Elizabeth Reyes; Cuba	226 kg	Avery Owens; United States	222 kg
+87 kg
Snatch	Park Hye-jeong; South Korea	120 kg	Aisamal Sansyzbayeva; Kazakhstan	112 kg	Adbeel Rodríguez; Mexico	111 kg
Clean & Jerk	Park Hye-jeong; South Korea	161 kg	Kim Hyo-eon; South Korea	145 kg	Adbeel Rodríguez; Mexico	141 kg
Total	Park Hye-jeong; South Korea	281 kg	Kim Hyo-eon; South Korea	253 kg	Aisamal Sansyzbayeva; Kazakhstan	252 kg

== Team ranking ==
=== Men ===
Rank	Team	Points
1	Turkey	604
2	Armenia	464
3	United States	443
4	Ukraine	410
5	Egypt	400
6	Kazakhstan	373
7	Greece	305
8	Mexico	303
9	Uzbekistan	286
10	Georgia	253

=== Women ===
Rank	Team	Points
1	United States	632
2	Turkey	515
3	India	385
4	Mexico	366
5	Ukraine	357
6	Greece	320
7	Poland	319
8	South Korea	315
9	Egypt	315
10	Ecuador	310

== Participating nations ==
293 athletes from 58 countries:

1. Albania (2)
2. Argentina (3)
3. Armenia (9)
4. Australia (6)
5. Austria (1)
6. Bahrain (1)
7. Bangladesh (2)
8. Belgium (1)
9. Bosnia and Herzegovina (2)
10. Brazil (2)
11. Canada (5)
12. Chile (5)
13. Colombia (7)
14. Croatia (3)
15. Cuba (2)
16. Czech Republic (6)
17. Ecuador (6)
18. Egypt (11)
19. Finland (3)
20. France (1)
21. Georgia (5)
22. Germany (2)
23. Great Britain (6)
24. Greece (20) (Host)
25. Hungary (2)
26. Iceland (2)
27. India (8)
28. Indonesia (4)
29. Iran (2)
30. Iraq (2)
31. Ireland (1)
32. Israel (5)
33. Italy (3)
34. Kazakhstan (8)
35. Latvia (1)
36. Malta (1)
37. Mexico (10)
38. Moldova (3)
39. Mongolia (3)
40. Morocco (6)
41. New Zealand (1)
42. Norway (2)
43. Palestine (1)
44. Peru (1)
45. Poland (12)
46. Saudi Arabia (6)
47. Slovakia (3)
48. South Korea (10)
49. Spain (6)
50. Sweden (2)
51. Switzerland (1)
52. Thailand (7)
53. Turkmenistan (8)
54. Turkey (18)
55. Ukraine (13)
56. United States (19)
57. Uzbekistan (6)
58. Venezuela (5)

Belarusian and Russian weightlifters will not compete at the event after a ban as a result of the Russian invasion of Ukraine.

=== Most participants ===
Rank	Country	Athletes (W+M)
1	Greece	10+10=20
2	United States	10+9=19
3	Turkey	8+10=18
4	Ukraine	7+6=13
5	Poland	7+5=12
6	Egypt	5+6=11
7	Mexico	5+5=10
7	South Korea	5+5=10
9	Armenia	1+8=9
10	India	6+2=8
10	Kazakhstan	2+6=8
10	Turkmenistan	4+4=8

== Men's results ==
=== Men's 55 kg ===
Rank	Athlete	Group	Body weight	Snatch (kg)				Clean & Jerk (kg)				Total
Rank	Athlete	Group	Body weight	1	2	3	Rank	1	2	3	Rank	Total
1st place, gold medalist(s)	Garnik Cholakyan (ARM)	A	55.00 kg	100	104	108	1st place, gold medalist(s)	125	130	132	1st place, gold medalist(s)	240
2nd place, silver medalist(s)	José Poox (MEX)	A	54.75 kg	96	101	103	3rd place, bronze medalist(s)	~~126~~	126	131	2nd place, silver medalist(s)	234
3rd place, bronze medalist(s)	Mustafa Erdoğan (TUR)	A	54.85 kg	98	101	~~104~~	5	121	~~126~~	127	3rd place, bronze medalist(s)	228
4	Ali Majed Kalitit (KSA)	A	54.80 kg	98	102	~~105~~	4	122	~~125~~	125	5	227
5	Federico La Barbera (ITA)	A	54.85 kg	100	~~103~~	~~105~~	6	~~125~~	125	~~129~~	6	225
6	Juan Barco (MEX)	A	55.00 kg	92	96	~~99~~	7	122	126	~~129~~	4	222
7	Alexandr Džobák (CZE)	A	51.05 kg	80	~~85~~	85	8	100	107	~~112~~	8	192
8	Stefanos Trakossas (GRE)	A	54.50 kg	65	70	73	9	90	~~95~~	97	9	170
—	Ertuğrul Secgin (TUR)	A	54.45 kg	~~98~~	~~98~~	~~99~~	—	117	~~123~~	123	7	—
—	Jostyn Torralvo (COL)	A	54.95 kg	101	103	~~107~~	2nd place, silver medalist(s)	—	—	—	—	—

=== Men's 61 kg ===
Rank	Athlete	Group	Body weight	Snatch (kg)				Clean & Jerk (kg)				Total
Rank	Athlete	Group	Body weight	1	2	3	Rank	1	2	3	Rank	Total
1st place, gold medalist(s)	Hampton Morris (USA)	A	60.50 kg	~~116~~	~~116~~	116	6	150	154	160	1st place, gold medalist(s)	276
2nd place, silver medalist(s)	Kaan Kahriman (TUR)	A	60.60 kg	121	~~125~~	126	1st place, gold medalist(s)	135	140	143	7	269
3rd place, bronze medalist(s)	Daniel Caicedo (COL)	A	60.80 kg	118	121	~~123~~	3rd place, bronze medalist(s)	143	146	~~149~~	2nd place, silver medalist(s)	267
4	T Madhavan (IND)	A	60.60 kg	114	118	~~121~~	4	136	140	~~145~~	5	263
5	Herseleid Carrazco (MEX)	A	60.70 kg	~~112~~	112	117	5	144	~~147~~	~~148~~	6	261
6	Muna Nayak (IND)	A	60.80 kg	108	~~113~~	113	8	140	145	~~150~~	4	258
7	Cho Min-jae (KOR)	B	60.50 kg	111	~~116~~	~~116~~	9	141	145	~~150~~	3rd place, bronze medalist(s)	256
8	Helmi Abdelbari (EGY)	B	60.90 kg	105	~~110~~	110	10	131	~~141~~	~~143~~	10	241
9	Pasit Saengma (THA)	A	60.85 kg	~~105~~	105	~~110~~	12	135	~~139~~	~~139~~	8	240
10	Konstantinos Lampridis (GRE)	B	60.55 kg	100	103	~~107~~	13	127	133	~~137~~	9	236
11	Benjamin Hickling (GBR)	B	58.45 kg	92	96	99	14	115	~~120~~	~~120~~	11	214
—	Sergio Massidda (ITA)	A	61.00 kg	123	125	~~127~~	2nd place, silver medalist(s)	—	—	—	—	—
—	Andranik Papeyan (ARM)	A	60.70 kg	115	~~120~~	~~120~~	7	~~140~~	~~140~~	~~140~~	—	—
—	Benjamin Zurita (ECU)	B	59.90 kg	~~105~~	105	106	11	~~135~~	~~135~~	~~135~~	—	—

=== Men's 67 kg ===
Rank	Athlete	Group	Body weight	Snatch (kg)				Clean & Jerk (kg)				Total
Rank	Athlete	Group	Body weight	1	2	3	Rank	1	2	3	Rank	Total
1st place, gold medalist(s)	Weeraphon Wichuma (THA)	A	67.00 kg	135	138	140	1st place, gold medalist(s)	166	171	~~175~~	2nd place, silver medalist(s)	311
2nd place, silver medalist(s)	Yusuf Fehmi Genç (TUR)	A	66.95 kg	130	~~134~~	136	3rd place, bronze medalist(s)	165	171	~~176~~	1st place, gold medalist(s)	307
3rd place, bronze medalist(s)	Gor Sahakyan (ARM)	A	66.55 kg	130	135	137	2nd place, silver medalist(s)	160	165	~~170~~	3rd place, bronze medalist(s)	302
4	Mohamed Abdelmonim (EGY)	A	66.80 kg	125	~~131~~	132	4	150	158	161	4	293
5	Gurami Giorbelidze (GEO)	A	66.55 kg	125	128	131	5	152	157	~~161~~	5	288
6	Jusie Arango (VEN)	A	67.00 kg	122	~~127~~	127	6	150	154	~~159~~	6	281
7	Mario Marquez (USA)	A	66.90 kg	113	117	121	7	145	150	~~155~~	8	271
8	Darvin Pech (MEX)	B	66.80 kg	115	120	~~125~~	8	145	150	~~155~~	7	270
9	Sergio Cares (CHI)	A	66.90 kg	117	~~121~~	~~121~~	9	135	140	~~145~~	9	257
10	Sofoklis Tsourakis (GRE)	B	66.75 kg	95	~~100~~	101	11	120	126	130	10	231
11	Sajmir Lagja (ALB)	B	66.95 kg	95	100	102	10	~~120~~	120	~~126~~	12	222
12	Abderrahmane Rhaloui (MAR)	B	65.05 kg	~~100~~	~~101~~	101	12	120	~~126~~	~~126~~	11	221
13	Faris Durak (BIH)	B	64.20 kg	82	87	90	13	103	108	112	13	202

=== Men's 73 kg ===
Rank	Athlete	Group	Body weight	Snatch (kg)				Clean & Jerk (kg)				Total
Rank	Athlete	Group	Body weight	1	2	3	Rank	1	2	3	Rank	Total
1st place, gold medalist(s)	Rizki Juniansyah (INA)	A	72.45 kg	147	156	—	1st place, gold medalist(s)	185	~~195~~	~~199~~	1st place, gold medalist(s)	341
2nd place, silver medalist(s)	Alexey Churkin (KAZ)	A	72.80 kg	138	142	146	2nd place, silver medalist(s)	177	183	~~187~~	2nd place, silver medalist(s)	329
3rd place, bronze medalist(s)	Ryan Grimsland (USA)	A	72.80 kg	136	140	145	3rd place, bronze medalist(s)	176	182	~~187~~	3rd place, bronze medalist(s)	327
4	Ogabek Tukhtaev (UZB)	A	73.00 kg	133	136	~~139~~	6	165	172	177	4	313
5	Petr Khrebtov (KAZ)	A	72.70 kg	~~133~~	133	137	5	170	~~175~~	~~175~~	6	307
6	Gaýgysyz Töräýew (TKM)	A	73.00 kg	133	~~136~~	~~136~~	10	165	171	~~173~~	5	'304
7	Sebastián Cabala (SVK)	A	72.60 kg	134	137	~~141~~	4	~~165~~	165	~~173~~	9	302
8	Ismail Jamali (ESP)	A	73.00 kg	~~135~~	135	~~139~~	7	163	167	~~172~~	7	302
9	Bektimur Reýimow (TKM)	A	72.40 kg	134	~~137~~	~~138~~	9	161	~~166~~	~~166~~	11	295
10	Richard Ollo (VEN)	B	72.45 kg	123	~~129~~	130	11	152	~~158~~	158	12	288
11	Caden Cahoy (USA)	B	70.00 kg	119	122	~~125~~	14	155	160	165	8	287
12	Kilian Gallart (ESP)	B	71.85 kg	117	~~122~~	123	13	145	~~150~~	153	13	276
13	Nicolás Rivero (ARG)	B	72.70 kg	124	129	~~131~~	12	142	146	~~153~~	16	275
14	Mats Hofstad (NOR)	B	72.80 kg	~~120~~	120	~~125~~	15	145	150	~~155~~	14	270
15	Jawad Al-Qaysum (KSA)	B	71.55 kg	112	~~117~~	~~118~~	18	143	147	~~152~~	15	259
16	Matěj Matějíček (SVK)	B	72.10 kg	107	112	~~115~~	19	137	142	146	17	258
17	Nikola Todorović (CRO)	B	72.00 kg	107	112	115	16	130	~~138~~	138	20	253
18	Nelson Harris (AUS)	B	72.65 kg	112	~~116~~	~~116~~	17	~~141~~	~~141~~	141	18	253
19	Ioannis Kliampas (GRE)	B	71.70 kg	105	111	~~113~~	20	130	136	140	19	251
20	Evangelos Tapeinos (GRE)	B	71.70 kg	~~98~~	98	~~106~~	21	125	130	~~136~~	21	228
—	Jhon Valero (COL)	A	72.75 kg	130	~~135~~	135	8	~~170~~	~~170~~	—	—	—
—	Choi Ji-ho (KOR)	A	72.60 kg	~~134~~	~~134~~	~~134~~	—	162	~~167~~	~~167~~	10	—

=== Men's 81 kg ===
Rank	Athlete	Group	Body weight	Snatch (kg)				Clean & Jerk (kg)				Total
Rank	Athlete	Group	Body weight	1	2	3	Rank	1	2	3	Rank	Total
1st place, gold medalist(s)	Hakan Şükrü Kurnaz (TUR)	A	80.75 kg	146	150	~~153~~	1st place, gold medalist(s)	166	171	174	5	324
2nd place, silver medalist(s)	Mahmoud Hosny Elsayed (EGY)	A	80.80 kg	137	~~141~~	142	5	~~173~~	173	182	2nd place, silver medalist(s)	324
3rd place, bronze medalist(s)	Saba Asanidze (GEO)	A	80.50 kg	~~137~~	137	141	6	176	~~181~~	183	1st place, gold medalist(s)	324
4	Ahmed Ali Mohamed Megaly (EGY)	A	80.95 kg	142	~~148~~	~~150~~	4	~~170~~	170	179	4	321
5	Denis Poluboyarinov (KAZ)	A	79.90 kg	140	~~144~~	~~145~~	8	175	181	~~185~~	3rd place, bronze medalist(s)	321
6	Yegor Sherer (KAZ)	A	80.30 kg	140	145	149	2nd place, silver medalist(s)	165	~~171~~	171	7	320
7	Ertjan Kofsha (ALB)	A	80.50 kg	141	144	146	3rd place, bronze medalist(s)	~~167~~	167	~~172~~	10	313
8	Dante Pizzuti (ARG)	A	80.00 kg	~~136~~	136	140	9	170	~~176~~	~~177~~	8	310
9	Mnatsakan Abrahamyan (ARM)	A	80.70 kg	133	138	~~142~~	10	170	~~180~~	~~182~~	9	308
10	Preston Powell (USA)	B	80.55 kg	130	135	140	7	161	166	~~171~~	11	306
11	Dimitrios Tsitlakidis (GRE)	B	80.20 kg	130	135	~~140~~	11	165	~~171~~	171	6	306
12	Michał Jaworski (POL)	A	80.50 kg	131	135	~~137~~	12	~~162~~	162	~~172~~	13	297
13	Szilárd Fekécs (HUN)	B	80.30 kg	131	~~135~~	~~136~~	13	160	165	~~167~~	12	296
14	Shad Darsigny (CAN)	B	77.75 kg	129	~~134~~	~~136~~	14	155	~~160~~	~~160~~	14	284
15	Vojtěch Krejčík (CZE)	B	79.20 kg	120	125	~~128~~	15	145	150	153	15	278
16	Christos Christoforidis (GRE)	B	80.95 kg	115	120	123	16	145	150	~~156~~	16	273
17	Tomer Marinovsky (ISR)	B	80.75 kg	~~113~~	113	~~117~~	18	138	142	145	17	258
18	Yanush Margulis (ISR)	B	79.80 kg	110	~~114~~	115	17	130	137	~~141~~	18	252
19	David Todorović (CRO)	B	75.60 kg	100	103	~~107~~	19	120	124	~~126~~	19	227
—	Ýazmämmet Annalyýew (TKM)	A	78.45 kg	~~141~~	~~141~~	~~142~~	—	—	—	—	—	—

=== Men's 89 kg ===
Rank	Athlete	Group	Body weight	Snatch (kg)				Clean & Jerk (kg)				Total
Rank	Athlete	Group	Body weight	1	2	3	Rank	1	2	3	Rank	Total
1st place, gold medalist(s)	Maksym Dombrovskyi (UKR)	A	88.80 kg	155	~~160~~	~~160~~	2nd place, silver medalist(s)	190	—	—	1st place, gold medalist(s)	345
2nd place, silver medalist(s)	Suren Grigoryan (ARM)	A	88.35 kg	150	~~155~~	155	3rd place, bronze medalist(s)	182	185	~~191~~	3rd place, bronze medalist(s)	340
3rd place, bronze medalist(s)	Mohamed Gamal (EGY)	A	88.50 kg	147	152	156	1st place, gold medalist(s)	178	183	~~189~~	4	339
4	Khojiakbar Olimov (UZB)	A	88.80 kg	149	~~154~~	~~155~~	7	183	188	~~192~~	2nd place, silver medalist(s)	337
5	Enes Çelik (TUR)	A	88.55 kg	145	151	154	4	168	175	~~181~~	8	329
6	Manuchar Gogokhia (GEO)	A	88.05 kg	148	153	~~155~~	5	167	172	~~177~~	10	325
7	Klim Bashargin (KAZ)	A	88.45 kg	143	148	152	6	168	~~173~~	173	9	325
8	Abbas Al-Suwaid (IRQ)	B	88.45 kg	137	141	143	10	170	177	~~180~~	7	320
9	Jonathan Ramos (MEX)	A	88.40 kg	136	141	~~144~~	11	~~177~~	178	~~185~~	6	319
10	Maksym Moskvin (UKR)	A	85.40 kg	135	140	~~144~~	13	175	179	~~184~~	5	319
11	Sergio Fernández (ESP)	A	86.35 kg	138	144	~~148~~	9	~~171~~	~~171~~	172	11	316
12	Grzegorz Barański (POL)	B	88.20 kg	133	137	140	12	157	162	165	12	305
13	Stefano Cataldi (GBR)	B	86.95 kg	126	131	134	16	160	~~165>~~	165	13	299
14	Dade Stanley (USA)	B	88.85 kg	127	131	135	14	159	~~165~~	~~165~~	17	294
15	Bader Aleid Nawaf (KSA)	B	83.85 kg	125	128	132	17	~~155~~	155	160	16	292
16	Im Byung-jin (KOR)	C	82.35 kg	125	131	~~136~~	18	160	~~165~~	~~170~~	14	291
17	Oliver Saxton (AUS)	C	88.15 kg	130	~~136~~	~~136~~	19	~~160~~	160	~~167~~	15	290
18	Emmanouil Damoulakis (GRE)	C	82.80 kg	115	120	124	22	~~145~~	145	151	19	275
19	Brynjar Halldórsson (ISL)	C	86.95 kg	120	123	125	21	140	~~146~~	146	20	271
20	Erik Chopsonidis (GRE)	C	85.50 kg	108	113	~~117~~	23	148	152	~~156~~	18	265
—	Gevorg Ghahramanyan (ARM)	A	88.40 kg	~~140~~	140	145	8	~~190~~	~~190~~	~~190~~	—	—
—	Nicolás Cuevas (CHI)	B	87.80 kg	130	134	~~136~~	15	~~160~~	~~160~~	~~160~~	—	—
—	Lander Wells (USA)	B	88.40 kg	126	130	~~134~~	20	~~159~~	~~159~~	~~159~~	—	—

=== Men's 96 kg ===
Rank	Athlete	Group	Body weight	Snatch (kg)				Clean & Jerk (kg)				Total
Rank	Athlete	Group	Body weight	1	2	3	Rank	1	2	3	Rank	Total
1st place, gold medalist(s)	Garik Karapetyan (ARM)	A	95.90 kg	160	164	170	1st place, gold medalist(s)	190	195	200	3rd place, bronze medalist(s)	370
2nd place, silver medalist(s)	Tudor Bratu (MDA)	A	94.35 kg	155	160	163	2nd place, silver medalist(s)	195	~~200~~	201	2nd place, silver medalist(s)	364
3rd place, bronze medalist(s)	Yasser Usama Hemdan (EGY)	A	95.30 kg	153	157	~~161~~	3rd place, bronze medalist(s)	190	197	202	1st place, gold medalist(s)	359
4	Amel Atencia (PER)	A	91.75 kg	145	150	154	4	185	~~190~~	~~190~~	4	339
5	Ali Yousef Alothman (KSA)	A	91.25 kg	148	153	~~156~~	6	185	~~192~~	~~193~~	5	338
6	Oleh Nikolaienko (UKR)	A	95.00 kg	153	~~156~~	~~156~~	5	172	178	181	8	334
7	Joen Vikingsson Sjöblom (SWE)	A	95.20 kg	144	~~147~~	147	8	177	181	~~184~~	7	328
8	Timothy Davis (USA)	A	93.35 kg	142	~~147~~	147	7	180	~~188~~	~~188~~	10	327
9	Sultan Meiram (KAZ)	A	95.70 kg	142	146	~~148~~	9	181	~~185~~	—	6	327
10	Emre Öztürk (TUR)	A	95.85 kg	140	144	~~147~~	10	180	~~187~~	~~187~~	9	324
11	Xavier Lusignan (CAN)	A	92.85 kg	138	143	~~148~~	11	168	173	~~177~~	11	316
12	Noah Milford (AUS)	B	95.00 kg	120	125	130	16	163	170	~~175~~	12	300
13	Maksymilian Dorn (POL)	B	95.75 kg	125	130	133	14	160	~~166~~	166	13	299
14	Drew Burns (GBR)	B	91.10 kg	126	131	134	13	155	160	164	14	298
15	Roche Shane (IRL)	B	94.55 kg	120	~~126~~	126	17	150	156	~~160~~	15	282
—	Thomas Shannon (AUS)	B	94.10 kg	130	~~135~~	135	12	~~170~~	~~170~~	~~170~~	—	—
—	Said Alioua (MAR)	B	92.60 kg	125	130	~~134~~	15	~~170~~	~~170~~	~~171~~	—	—
—	Konstantinos Klothakis (GRE)	B	95.70 kg	~~115~~	~~115~~	115	18	~~140~~	~~140~~	~~140~~	—	—

=== Men's 102 kg ===
Rank	Athlete	Group	Body weight	Snatch (kg)				Clean & Jerk (kg)				Total
Rank	Athlete	Group	Body weight	1	2	3	Rank	1	2	3	Rank	Total
1st place, gold medalist(s)	Sharofiddin Amriddinov (UZB)	A	101.10 kg	158	162	168	2nd place, silver medalist(s)	194	200	204	1st place, gold medalist(s)	372
2nd place, silver medalist(s)	Petros Petrosyan (ARM)	A	100.30 kg	155	~~160~~	161	4	195	202	~~212~~	2nd place, silver medalist(s)	363
3rd place, bronze medalist(s)	Mohammed Hamada (PLE)	A	101.35 kg	156	160	168	1st place, gold medalist(s)	193	~~197~~	~~198~~	4	361
4	Mykyta Rubanovskyi (UKR)	A	101.85 kg	155	160	163	3rd place, bronze medalist(s)	195	~~200~~	~~200~~	3rd place, bronze medalist(s)	358
5	Gurami Vekua (GEO)	A	101.75 kg	148	151	153	5	~~187~~	~~187~~	187	6	340
6	Lesther Fernández (CUB)	A	101.65 kg	143	~~147~~	147	7	182	186	190	5	337
7	Taner Çağlar (TUR)	A	101.60 kg	145	149	~~152~~	6	175	~~180~~	182	8	331
8	Morgan McCullough (USA)	A	101.20 kg	142	146	~~150~~	8	~~184~~	~~184~~	184	7	330

=== Men's 109 kg ===
Rank	Athlete	Group	Body weight	Snatch (kg)				Clean & Jerk (kg)				Total
Rank	Athlete	Group	Body weight	1	2	3	Rank	1	2	3	Rank	Total
1st place, gold medalist(s)	Bohdan Hoza (UKR)	A	108.95 kg	180	191	195	1st place, gold medalist(s)	205	215	—	1st place, gold medalist(s)	410
2nd place, silver medalist(s)	Ammar Rubaiawi (IRQ)	A	108.15 kg	161	163	168	2nd place, silver medalist(s)	191	~~197~~	~~197~~	5	359
3rd place, bronze medalist(s)	Arley Bonilla (COL)	A	108.75 kg	154	157	160	4	~~194~~	~~195~~	195	3rd place, bronze medalist(s)	355
4	Lee Seung-hoon (KOR)	A	108.10 kg	155	158	162	3rd place, bronze medalist(s)	186	~~192~~	192	4	354
5	Onur Demirci (TUR)	A	108.10 kg	~~155~~	155	~~161~~	6	186	194	196	2nd place, silver medalist(s)	351
6	Igor Osuch (POL)	A	109.00 kg	149	153	156	5	175	186	~~191~~	6	342
7	Artiom Gritenco (MDA)	A	108.10 kg	145	150	~~153~~	7	175	~~180~~	~~182~~	7	325
8	Szymon Ziółkowski (POL)	A	108.35 kg	146	~~150~~	~~150~~	8	164	168	172	8	318
9	Levente Lucz (HUN)	A	106.40 kg	133	137	140	9	162	166	169	10	309
10	Jan Kolář (CZE)	A	102.20 kg	131	135	138	10	157	165	169	9	307

=== Men's +109 kg ===
Rank	Athlete	Group	Body weight	Snatch (kg)				Clean & Jerk (kg)				Total
Rank	Athlete	Group	Body weight	1	2	3	Rank	1	2	3	Rank	Total
1st place, gold medalist(s)	Alireza Yousefi (IRI)	A	190.40 kg	166	171	177	1st place, gold medalist(s)	215	~~239~~	239	1st place, gold medalist(s)	416
2nd place, silver medalist(s)	Mirkhosil Mirzabaev (UZB)	A	125.05 kg	165	170	176	2nd place, silver medalist(s)	201	207	212	2nd place, silver medalist(s)	388
3rd place, bronze medalist(s)	Bohdan Taranenko (UKR)	A	147.50 kg	160	163	167	3rd place, bronze medalist(s)	201	207	~~211~~	4	374
4	Atajan Daýyýew (TKM)	A	149.95 kg	156	~~161~~	162	4	202	208	~~213~~	3rd place, bronze medalist(s)	370
5	Nam Ji-yong (KOR)	A	130.05 kg	150	157	161	5	~~203~~	204	~~210~~	5	365
6	Ali Oflaz (TUR)	A	140.80 kg	150	158	~~162~~	6	190	203	~~210~~	6	361
7	Alonso Bizama (CHI)	A	129.40 kg	125	132	140	8	162	169	174	7	314
—	Bilal Bouamr (MAR)	A	119.70 kg	135	~~141~~	141	7	~~170~~	~~172~~	~~172~~	—	—

== Women's results ==
=== Women's 45 kg ===
Rank	Athlete	Group	Body weight	Snatch (kg)				Clean & Jerk (kg)				Total
Rank	Athlete	Group	Body weight	1	2	3	Rank	1	2	3	Rank	Total
1st place, gold medalist(s)	Harshada Sharad Garud (IND)	A	44.55 kg	64	67	70	1st place, gold medalist(s)	78	81	83	2nd place, silver medalist(s)	153
2nd place, silver medalist(s)	Cansu Bektaş (TUR)	A	44.35 kg	~~65~~	~~65~~	65	6	82	~~85~~	85	1st place, gold medalist(s)	150
3rd place, bronze medalist(s)	Teodora-Luminița Hîncu (MDA)	A	45.00 kg	67	~~69~~	~~69~~	3rd place, bronze medalist(s)	82	~~85~~	~~85~~	3rd place, bronze medalist(s)	149
4	Najla Khoirunnisa (INA)	A	45.00 kg	63	~~67~~	67	4	81	~~85~~	~~85~~	4	148
5	Anjali Patel (IND)	A	44.85 kg	65	~~67~~	67	5	~~79~~	79	81	6	148
6	Marta García (ESP)	A	44.60 kg	65	~~68~~	68	2nd place, silver medalist(s)	75	78	~~82~~	7	146
7	Gamze Altun (TUR)	A	44.75 kg	57	~~60~~	60	7	78	81	~~84~~	5	141
—	Ruth Fuentefría (ESP)	A	44.60 kg	~~66~~	~~66~~	~~68~~	—	72	~~75~~	~~75~~	8	—

=== Women's 49 kg ===
Rank	Athlete	Group	Body weight	Snatch (kg)				Clean & Jerk (kg)				Total
Rank	Athlete	Group	Body weight	1	2	3	Rank	1	2	3	Rank	Total
1st place, gold medalist(s)	Windy Cantika Aisah (INA)	A	48.95 kg	77	81	83	1st place, gold medalist(s)	97	102	—	1st place, gold medalist(s)	185
2nd place, silver medalist(s)	Gyaneshwari Yadav (IND)	A	48.85 kg	70	73	~~75~~	2nd place, silver medalist(s)	81	83	~~85~~	2nd place, silver medalist(s)	156
3rd place, bronze medalist(s)	V Rithika (IND)	A	48.90 kg	69	~~71~~	~~71~~	3rd place, bronze medalist(s)	81	~~83~~	~~85~~	4	150
4	Maha Fajreslam (MAR)	A	48.15 kg	61	64	65	4	77	~~82~~	82	3rd place, bronze medalist(s)	147
5	Marjia Akter Ekra (BAN)	A	48.35 kg	60	63	~~65~~	5	~~75~~	75	77	5	130
6	Ela Furth (ISR)	A	49.00 kg	55	58	61	6	~~71~~	72	~~75~~	6	133
7	Efraimia Papoutsaki (GRE)	A	48.55 kg	50	~~53~~	53	7	68	~~72~~	~~73~~	7	121
8	Vasiliki Rapti (GRE)	A	48.40 kg	~~50~~	50	~~54~~	8	60	~~65~~	65	8	115
9	Nejla Kalača (BIH)	A	45.80 kg	~~38~~	38	41	9	49	51	53	9	94
10	Khaled Aameri (KSA)	A	47.40 kg	~~40~~	~~40~~	40	10	48	~~52~~	~~52~~	10	88

=== Women's 55 kg ===
Rank	Athlete	Group	Body weight	Snatch (kg)				Clean & Jerk (kg)				Total
Rank	Athlete	Group	Body weight	1	2	3	Rank	1	2	3	Rank	Total
1st place, gold medalist(s)	Nina Sterckx (BEL)	A	54.95 kg	88	90	93	1st place, gold medalist(s)	107	111	~~114~~	1st place, gold medalist(s)	204
2nd place, silver medalist(s)	Svitlana Samuliak (UKR)	A	54.90 kg	85	87	89	2nd place, silver medalist(s)	100	~~103~~	103	5	192
3rd place, bronze medalist(s)	Jamila Panfilova (UZB)	A	54.55 kg	80	83	86	3rd place, bronze medalist(s)	100	~~102~~	~~102~~	6	186
4	Leila Cook (USA)	A	54.65 kg	75	78	~~80~~	11	102	104	106	2nd place, silver medalist(s)	184
5	Juliana Klarisa (INA)	A	55.00 kg	80	~~83~~	~~84~~	7	103	~~105~~	~~107~~	3rd place, bronze medalist(s)	183
6	Poisian Yodsarn (THA)	A	54.80 kg	75	79	82	4	97	100	~~104~~	7	182
7	Shrabani Das (IND)	A	54.45 kg	75	~~78~~	78	13	95	99	103	4	181
8	Tenishia Thornton (MLT)	B	55.00 kg	77	79	81	6	96	~~99~~	99	9	180
9	Annika Pilz (GER)	A	54.45 kg	77	~~80~~	80	9	97	~~100~~	100	8	180
10	Juliannis Quintero (VEN)	B	53.20 kg	78	81	~~83~~	5	97	~~100~~	~~100~~	12	178
11	Viola Valoggia (ITA)	A	54.85 kg	~~76~~	76	80	8	98'	~~102~~	~~106~~	10	178
12	Elena Tzatzollari (GRE)	A	54.75 kg	77	~~79~~	~~80~~	14	96	98	~~100~~	11	175
13	Yekaterina Alyakina (KAZ)	A	54.60 kg	73	~~78~~	78	12	93	96	~~99~~	13	174
14	Noura Essam (EGY)	B	53.20 kg	71	75	78	10	91	~~97~~	~~97~~	14	169
15	Ogulgerek Amanowa (TKM)	B	54.10 kg	70	~~73~~	~~73~~	16	84	87	91	15	161
16	Roni Shaham (ISR)	B	54.65 kg	68	~~71~~	72	15	88	~~91~~	~~92~~	17	160
17	Zuzanna Polka (POL)	B	54.95 kg	67	70	~~73~~	17	87	90	~~92~~	16	160
18	Nataša Dermiček (CRO)	B	52.70 kg	52	54	55	18	68	~~70~~	~~70~~	18	123

=== Women's 59 kg ===
Rank	Athlete	Group	Body weight	Snatch (kg)				Clean & Jerk (kg)				Total
Rank	Athlete	Group	Body weight	1	2	3	Rank	1	2	3	Rank	Total
1st place, gold medalist(s)	Daphne Guillén (MEX)	A	58.95 kg	89	~~92~~	~~92~~	4	110	112	114	1st place, gold medalist(s)	203
2nd place, silver medalist(s)	Katharine Estep (USA)	A	58.75 kg	85	88	91	1st place, gold medalist(s)	~~109~~	~~109~~	109	7	200
3rd place, bronze medalist(s)	Karen Mosquera (COL)	B	58.45 kg	83	87	90	2nd place, silver medalist(s)	105	~~108~~	109	4	199
4	Meaghan Strey (USA)	A	58.90 kg	86	89	~~92~~	5	~~108~~	~~108~~	109	6	198
5	Jenifer Becerra (ECU)	A	57.85 kg	83	86	~~888~~	7	105	109	111	3rd place, bronze medalist(s)	197
6	Suratwadee Yodsarn (THA)	A	57.40 kg	80	~~84~~	84	11	105	110	113	2nd place, silver medalist(s)	197
7	Alina Zakharchenko (UKR)	A	58.70 kg	88	90	~~92~~	3rd place, bronze medalist(s)	102	~~106~~	106	8	196
8	Ariana Uzcategui (VEN)	A	58.90 kg	~~84~~	84	~~87~~	10	106	109	~~112~~	5	193
9	Cansel Özkan (TUR)	A	58.90 kg	85	~~88~~	~~91~~	8	~~105~~	105	~~110~~	12	190
10	Medine Amanowa (TKM)	B	58.95 kg	80	82	84	9	104	~~107~~	~~109~~	13	188
11	Monika Szymanek (POL)	A	58.80 kg	~~80~~	80	~~83~~	15	~~106~~	~~106~~	106	9	186
12	Júlia Vieira (BRA)	B	58.45 kg	~~78~~	80	~~83~~	13	100	105	~~110~~	10	185
13	Parichat Kunnara (THA)	B	59.00 kg	79	~~82~~	~~82~~	16	98	102	105	11	184
14	Charlotte Simoneau (CAN)	B	58.90 kg	77	80	~~83~~	12	97	100	103	14	183
15	Tori Sue Gallegos (AUS)	B	58.75 kg	~~80~~	80	~~84~~	14	100	~~105~~	~~105~~	16	180
16	Tilde Muhrman (SWE)	B	58.50 kg	72	75	77	17	95	99	101	15	178
17	Gülälek Kakamyradowa (TKM)	B	58.85 kg	72	75	~~78~~	19	84	87	90	17	165
18	Eliška Malcharcziková (CZE)	B	58.70 kg	72	~~76~~	76	18	86	~~91~~	~~91~~	18	162
19	Farjana Akter Riya (BAN)	B	58.25 kg	63	66	~~68~~	20	80	~~84~~	~~84~~	19	146
20	Galini Fotiadi (GRE)	B	57.95 kg	60	64	~~66~~	21	70	~~75~~	~~75~~	20	134
—	Olha Ivzhenko (UKR)	A	58.70 kg	87	~~90~~	~~90~~	6	~~105~~	~~105~~	~~105~~	—	—
—	Boldbaataryn Khongorzul (MGL)	A	58.45 kg	~~85~~	~~85~~	~~85~~	—	~~108~~	~~110~~	~~112~~	—	—

=== Women's 64 kg ===
Rank	Athlete	Group	Body weight	Snatch (kg)				Clean & Jerk (kg)				Total
Rank	Athlete	Group	Body weight	1	2	3	Rank	1	2	3	Rank	Total
1st place, gold medalist(s)	Julieth Rodríguez (COL)	A	63.65 kg	95	97	~~99~~	1st place, gold medalist(s)	117	120	124	1st place, gold medalist(s)	221
2nd place, silver medalist(s)	Queysi Rojas (MEX)	A	62.85 kg	90	93	96	2nd place, silver medalist(s)	115	119	~~122~~	2nd place, silver medalist(s)	215
3rd place, bronze medalist(s)	Marie Mantaropoulos (FRA)	A	63.85 kg	88	90	~~92~~	4	107	110	114	3rd place, bronze medalist(s)	204
4	Thipwara Chontavin (THA)	A	63.95 kg	86	89	~~91~~	5	107	110	113	4	202
5	Antonia Ackermann (GER)	A	63.55 kg	84	87	91	3rd place, bronze medalist(s)	104	108	~~111~~	6	199
6	Abby Raymond (USA)	A	63.50 kg	85	~~88~~	88	6	108	~~103~~	~~103~~	5	196
7	Vitaliia Fylypiv (UKR)	A	64.00 kg	85	87	~~89~~	7	100	104	~~106~~	8	191
8	Maria Polka (POL)	A	61.60 kg	79	82	84	9	~~101~~	101	104	9	188
9	Jannike Bäckström (FIN)	A	63.15 kg	77	80	83	11	100	~~103~~	103	10	186
10	Son A-ra (KOR)	B	63.75 kg	~~78~~	~~78~~	78	12	102	~~106~~	106	7	184
11	Julia Jordanger Loen (NOR)	A	63.55 kg	~~81~~	81	84	8	~~100~~	100	~~103~~	13	184
12	Lucila Ruiz (ARG)	B	62.60 kg	77	80	83	10	~~100~~	100	~~105~~	12	183
13	Miriana Velásquez (CHI)	B	63.20 kg	72	76	~~79~~	14	94	~~97~~	101	11	177
14	Ali Yusuf Yahya Zainab (BHR)	B	64.00 kg	73	77	~~79~~	13	92	~~95~~	~~95~~	15	169
15	Laila Miarelli (SUI)	B	63.70 kg	65	68	71	18	~~94~~	94	97	14	168
16	Marie Kubíková (CZE)	B	63.80 kg	71	75	~~77~~	15	89	92	~~94~~	16	167
17	Aya Amerane (MAR)	B	62.70 kg	68	71	74	16	~~88~~	88	~~94~~	17	162
18	Eleni Antoniadou (GRE)	B	62.95 kg	67	70	~~73~~	19	75	80	~~85~~	18	150
19	Hassan Alqurashi (KSA)	B	63.90 kg	35	~~40~~	~~40~~	20	45	~~48~~	48	19	83
—	Maria Myrilla (GRE)	B	63.25 kg	70	73	~~76~~	17	~~89~~	~~89~~	~~89~~	—	—

=== Women's 71 kg ===
Rank	Athlete	Group	Body weight	Snatch (kg)				Clean & Jerk (kg)				Total
Rank	Athlete	Group	Body weight	1	2	3	Rank	1	2	3	Rank	Total
1st place, gold medalist(s)	Neama Said (EGY)	A	69.00 kg	100	104	106	2nd place, silver medalist(s)	123	128	131	1st place, gold medalist(s)	237
2nd place, silver medalist(s)	Olivia Reeves (USA)	A	70.95 kg	103	105	107	1st place, gold medalist(s)	~~128~~	~~129~~	129	2nd place, silver medalist(s)	236
3rd place, bronze medalist(s)	Mariana García (MEX)	A	69.90 kg	92	95	~~98~~	5	123	~~127~~	127	3rd place, bronze medalist(s)	222
4	Aysel Özkan (TUR)	A	70.25 kg	95	98	101	3rd place, bronze medalist(s)	115	~~120~~	120	5	221
5	Erika Sinisterra (COL)	A	70.05 kg	91	93	~~95~~	6	122	~~125~~	~~126~~	4	215
6	Monika Marach (POL)	A	69.60 kg	92	95	97	4	110	~~113~~	114	11	211
7	Kim Hye-min (KOR)	B	68.55 kg	85	~~90~~	90	8	110	115	119	6	209
8	Park Ye-in (KOR)	B	70.30 kg	~~88~~	88	91	7	110	115	~~118~~	9	206
9	Reagan Henry (USA)	A	70.35 kg	84	88	~~90~~	10	110	114	117	8	205
10	Aino Luostarinen (FIN)	A	64.80 kg	88	~~91~~	~~92~~	9	110	~~114~~	115	10	203
11	Grace Candelario (ECU)	A	70.95 kg	85	~~90~~	~~90~~	15	114	~~118~~	118	7	203
12	Yevheniia Rosinska (UKR)	A	70.55 kg	~~88~~	~~88~~	88	11	~~109~~	109	~~112~~	13	197
13	Andżelika Kaczmarczyk (POL)	B	70.20 kg	82	85	~~87~~	14	102	~~106~~	106	15	191
14	Melissa Lin (CAN)	B	67.75 kg	81	~~84~~	86	13	101	104	—	16	190
15	Erin Friel (GBR)	B	70.55 kg	~~78~~	78	80	17	100	102	107	14	187
16	Dalit Kugel (ISR)	B	69.35 kg	80	84	86	12	95	~~99~~	100	20	186
17	Victoria Steiner (AUT)	B	70.80 kg	80	83	~~85~~	16	102	~~106~~	~~107~~	17	185
18	Úlfhildur Arna Unnarsdóttir (ISL)	B	69.85 kg	75	~~80~~	80	18	95	99	101	18	181
19	Rkia Sabihi (MAR)	B	70.80 kg	77	~~81~~	~~81~~	19	96	~~100~~	101	19	178
20	Lioni Chrysi (GRE)	B	68.50 kg	64	67	70	20	85	90	~~93~~	22	160
21	Chrysoula Chatzidaki (GRE)	B	66.80 kg	60	~~67~~	67	21	80	~~85~~	~~85~~	23	147
—	Maddison Power (AUS)	B	70.10 kg	~~80~~	~~80~~	~~80~~	—	97	~~100~~	~~100~~	21	—
—	Janette Ylisoini (FIN)	A	70.10 kg	~~87~~	~~87~~	~~87~~	—	~~108~~	108	112	12	—

=== Women's 76 kg ===
Rank	Athlete	Group	Body weight	Snatch (kg)				Clean & Jerk (kg)				Total
Rank	Athlete	Group	Body weight	1	2	3	Rank	1	2	3	Rank	Total
1st place, gold medalist(s)	Bella Paredes (ECU)	A	74.65 kg	99	101	104	1st place, gold medalist(s)	125	128	131	1st place, gold medalist(s)	235
2nd place, silver medalist(s)	Daniela Ivanova (LAT)	A	71.65 kg	91	95	~~97~~	4	121	126	127	2nd place, silver medalist(s)	222
3rd place, bronze medalist(s)	Duangkamon Khongthong (THA)	A	75.60 kg	91	95	97	2nd place, silver medalist(s)	120	~~124~~	124	4	221
4	Dilara Uçan (TUR)	A	72.15 kg	~~93~~	93	96	3rd place, bronze medalist(s)	~~120~~	120	125	3rd place, bronze medalist(s)	221
5	Roufida Fathi (EGY)	A	72.90 kg	87	91	93	5	115	122	~~126~~	5	215
6	Isabella Brown (GBR)	A	75.65 kg	84	87	90	6	105	108	~~110~~	7	198
7	Maria Karolak (POL)	A	74.45 kg	84	87	89	7	104	107	~~110~~	9	196
8	Alyssa Ballard (USA)	A	75.50 kg	81	~~84~~	84	10	108	112	~~116~~	6	196
9	Iryna Marfula (UKR)	A	73.90 kg	83	85	~~87~~	8	102	106	108	8	193
10	Gombosürengiin Enerel (MGL)	A	72.45 kg	81	84	~~86~~	9	~~106~~	106	~~108~~	10	190
11	Vendula Šafratová (CZE)	A	72.80 kg	~~78~~	78	81	11	98	~~103~~	~~103~~	11	179
12	Maria Papadopoulou (GRE)	A	73.40 kg	65	68	70	12	77	81	~~84~~	12	151

=== Women's 81 kg ===
Rank	Athlete	Group	Body weight	Snatch (kg)				Clean & Jerk (kg)				Total
Rank	Athlete	Group	Body weight	1	2	3	Rank	1	2	3	Rank	Total
1st place, gold medalist(s)	Dilara Narin (TUR)	A	80.60 kg	95	99	~~102~~	2nd place, silver medalist(s)	125	129	131	1st place, gold medalist(s)	230
2nd place, silver medalist(s)	Emmy González (MEX)	A	80.40 kg	97	100	~~102~~	1st place, gold medalist(s)	123	127	~~130~~	2nd place, silver medalist(s)	227
3rd place, bronze medalist(s)	Fatma Ahmed (EGY)	A	77.90 kg	94	~~98~~	99	3rd place, bronze medalist(s)	118	122	~~124~~	3rd place, bronze medalist(s)	221
4	Anna McElderry (USA)	A	81.00 kg	~~98~~	~~98~~	98	4	118	~~124~~	~~124~~	6	216
5	Kelin Jiménez (ECU)	A	76.80 kg	91	~~95~~	95	6	119	~~123~~	~~124~~	5	214
6	Irene Blanco Tarela (ESP)	B	78.40 kg	88	91	~~93~~	9	110	115	120	4	211
7	Milena Khachatryan (ARM)	A	79.40 kg	92	96	~~100~~	5	115	~~122~~	~~126~~	7	211
8	Elvira Borozna (UKR)	A	80.95 kg	88	91	93	7	106	110	113	8	206
9	Lenka Žembová (SVK)	B	80.40 kg	89	~~92~~	92	8	106	~~109~~	109	11	201
10	Natia Gadelia (GEO)	A	80.50 kg	~~88~~	88	~~92~~	12	112	~~117~~	~~118~~	9	200
11	Anamjan Rustamowa (TKM)	B	80.45 kg	86	89	91	10	108	~~111~~	~~111~~	12	199
12	Zoreannys Henríquez (VEN)	B	79.75 kg	83	~~89~~	89	11	105	110	~~113~~	10	199
13	Mönkhjantsangiin Oyu-Erdene (MGL)	B	80.95 kg	77	80	~~82~~	13	~~93~~	93	96	13	176

=== Women's 87 kg ===
Rank	Athlete	Group	Body weight	Snatch (kg)				Clean & Jerk (kg)				Total
Rank	Athlete	Group	Body weight	1	2	3	Rank	1	2	3	Rank	Total
1st place, gold medalist(s)	Tursunoy Jabborova (UZB)	A	86.45 kg	101	105	109	1st place, gold medalist(s)	122	126	129	1st place, gold medalist(s)	238
2nd place, silver medalist(s)	Elizabeth Reyes (CUB)	A	86.35 kg	94	~~98~~	99	5	123	127	~~130~~	2nd place, silver medalist(s)	226
3rd place, bronze medalist(s)	Avery Owens (USA)	A	86.90 kg	94	97	99	4	123	~~128~~	~~128~~	4	222
4	Yekta Jamali (IRI)	A	85.85 kg	94	98	100	2nd place, silver medalist(s)	115	~~121~~	121	6	221
5	Salma Farag (EGY)	A	86.30 kg	90	95	98	6	117	122	~~125~~	5	220
6	Sara Yenigün (TUR)	A	82.60 kg	90	~~95~~	~~95~~	9	122	125	127	3rd place, bronze medalist(s)	217
7	Amanda Robles (USA)	A	86.95 kg	94	98	100	3rd place, bronze medalist(s)	112	~~116~~	~~117~~	8	212
8	Carla Angulo (ECU)	A	83.05 kg	90	~~95~~	95	7	111	114	116	7	211
9	Emily Sweeney (GBR)	A	85.85 kg	90	~~94~~	94	8	~~112~~	112	~~118~~	9	206
10	Anna Salpikidou (GRE)	A	85.80 kg	~~68~~	68	~~72~~	10	82	~~88~~	~~88~~	10	150

=== Women's +87 kg ===
Rank	Athlete	Group	Body weight	Snatch (kg)				Clean & Jerk (kg)				Total
Rank	Athlete	Group	Body weight	1	2	3	Rank	1	2	3	Rank	Total
1st place, gold medalist(s)	Park Hye-jeong (KOR)	A	127.15 kg	113	120	~~126~~	1st place, gold medalist(s)	150	161	~~167~~	1st place, gold medalist(s)	281
2nd place, silver medalist(s)	Kim Hyo-eon (KOR)	A	117.35 kg	104	108	~~112~~	5	135	141	145	2nd place, silver medalist(s)	253
3rd place, bronze medalist(s)	Aisamal Sansyzbayeva (KAZ)	A	113.95 kg	105	109	112	2nd place, silver medalist(s)	135	140	~~145~~	4	252
4	Adbeel Rodríguez (MEX)	A	117.00 kg	103	107	111	3rd place, bronze medalist(s)	131	136	141	3rd place, bronze medalist(s)	252
5	Emma Friesen (CAN)	A	115.35 kg	101	106	110	4	123	~~129~~	131	5	241
6	Aleyna Kaymaz (TUR)	A	96.70 kg	92	96	99	7	125	~~131~~	131	6	230
7	Taiane Justino (BRA)	A	118.00 kg	98	~~102~~	102	6	127	~~132~~	~~132~~	7	229
8	Arantzazú Pavez (CHI)	A	118.10 kg	90	95	~~98~~	8	110	115	~~120~~	8	210
9	Miniah Sumerell (NZL)	A	114.85 kg	83	88	~~91~~	9	105	~~110~~	110	9	198
10	Martyna Narewska (POL)	A	119.05 kg	83	87	~~90~~	10	103	107	~~110~~	10	194
11	Maibam Martina (IND)	A	103.65 kg	77	81	84	11	96	101	~~104~~	11	183
