= Weightlifting at the 2021 Junior Pan American Games =

- Weightlifting pictogram
- Venue: Ramón Elías López Arena
- Dates: 26–29 November
- Competitors: 118 from 25 nations

Weightlifting competitions at the 2021 Junior Pan American Games were held from 26 to 29 November 2021 at the Ramón Elías López Arena in Palmira, Colombia.

== Medal summary ==
=== Medal table ===
* Host nation (Colombia)

Rank	Nation	Gold	Silver	Bronze	Total
1	Colombia*	7	1	1	9
2	United States	3	2	2	7
3	Ecuador	2	1	2	5
4	Mexico	1	6	0	7
5	Dominican Republic	1	1	1	3
6	Cuba	0	2	1	3
7	Venezuela	0	1	2	3
8	Argentina	0	0	2	2
9	Brazil	0	0	1	1
9	Chile	0	0	1	1
9	Peru	0	0	1	1
Totals (11 entries)		14	14	14	42

== Medalists ==
=== Men's ===
Event	Gold		Silver		Bronze	
61 kg	Estiven Villar; Colombia	274 kg	Hampton Morris; United States	267 kg	Fabián Márquez; Venezuela	263 kg
67 kg	Ryan Grimsland; United States	288 kg	Reinner Arango; Venezuela	286 kg	Sergio Cares; Chile	269 kg
73 kg	Juan Martínez; Colombia	306 kg	Edisnel Corrales; Cuba	305 kg	Santiago Villegas; Peru	291 kg
81 kg	Iván Escudero; Ecuador	342 kg	Mauricio Canul; Mexico	323 kg	Dante Pizzuti; Argentina	320 kg
96 kg	Yeison López Cuello; Colombia	353 kg	Jonathan Ramos; Mexico	330 kg	Neiser Grefa; Ecuador	329 kg
109 kg	Luis Quiñones; Colombia	356 kg	Antonio Govea; Mexico	339 kg	Morgan McCullough; United States	335 kg
+109 kg	Arley Bonilla; Colombia	347 kg	Ezequiel Germán; Dominican Republic	336 kg	Ryland Shriver; United States	335 kg

=== Women's ===
Event	Gold		Silver		Bronze	
49 kg	Dahiana Ortiz; Dominican Republic	185 kg	Yesica Hernández; Mexico	181 kg	Katherin Echandía; Venezuela	176 kg
55 kg	Katharine Estep; United States	192 kg	Irene Borrego; Mexico	191 kg	Antonina Moya; Colombia	189 kg
59 kg	Concepción Úsuga; Colombia	213 kg	Meaghan Strey; United States	194 kg	Jenifer Becerra; Ecuador	188 kg
64 kg	Julieth Rodríguez; Colombia	221 kg	Queysi Rojas; Mexico	215 kg	María Luz Casadevall; Argentina	212 kg
76 kg	Olivia Reeves; United States	235 kg	Kelin Jiménez; Ecuador	218 kg	Sindy Santana; Dominican Republic	217 kg
87 kg	Bella Paredes; Ecuador	229 kg	Sirley Montaño; Colombia	225 kg	Elizabeth Reyes; Cuba	222 kg
+87 kg	Adbeel Rodríguez; Mexico	246 kg	Marifélix Sarría; Cuba	223 kg	Taiane Justino; Brazil	220 kg
