= Queysi Rojas =

Mexican weightlifter (born 2002)

Personal information
- Full name: Queysi Julissa Rojas González
- Born: 19 March 2002 (age 24)

Sport
- Country: Mexico
- Sport: Weightlifting
- Weight class: 64 kg
Medal record
Women's weightlifting
Representing Mexico
Pan American Championships
Bronze medal – third place	2022 Bogotá	64 kg
Junior World Championships
Silver medal – second place	2022 Heraklion	64 kg
Junior Pan American Games
Silver medal – second place	2021 Cali-Valle	64 kg
Youth World Championships
Silver medal – second place	2019 Las Vegas	64 kg

Queysi Julissa Rojas González (born 19 March 2002) is a Mexican weightlifter. She won the bronze medal in the women's 64 kg event at the 2022 Pan American Weightlifting Championships held in Bogotá, Colombia.

In 2021, Rojas won the silver medal in the women's 64 kg event at the Junior Pan American Games held in Cali and Valle, Colombia. She also won the silver medal in her event at the 2022 Junior World Weightlifting Championships held in Heraklion, Greece.

== Achievements ==
Year	Venue	Weight	Snatch (kg)				Clean & Jerk (kg)				Total	Rank
Year	Venue	Weight	1	2	3	Rank	1	2	3	Rank	Total	Rank
Pan American Championships
2022	Bogotá, Colombia	64 kg	88	90	93	3rd place, bronze medalist(s)	110	115	~~118~~	3rd place, bronze medalist(s)	208	3rd place, bronze medalist(s)
