= Daniela Ivanova =

Latvian weightlifter

Sport
- Country: Latvia
- Sport: Weightlifting
- Weight class: 76 kg
Medal record
Women's weightlifting
Representing Latvia
European Championships
Silver medal – second place	2022 Tirana	76 kg
Bronze medal – third place	2023 Yerevan	76 kg
Junior World Championships
Silver medal – second place	2022 Heraklion	76 kg

Daniela Ivanova is a Latvian weightlifter. She won the silver medal in the women's 76 kg event at the 2022 European Weightlifting Championships held in Tirana, Albania. She won the bronze medal in the women's 76 kg event at the 2023 European Weightlifting Championships held in Yerevan, Armenia.

Ivanova won the silver medal in her event at the 2022 Junior World Weightlifting Championships held in Heraklion, Greece. She competed in the women's 76 kg event at the 2022 World Weightlifting Championships held in Bogotá, Colombia.
