= Harshada Garud =

Indian weightlifter

Personal information
- Full name: Harshada Sharad Garud
- Born: 8 November 2003 (age 22) Maharashtra, India

Sport
- Country: India
- Sport: Weightlifting
Medal record
Asian Championships
Bronze medal – third place	2022 Manama	45 kg
World Junior Championships
Gold medal – first place	2022 Heraklion	45 kg
Asian Junior Championships
Gold medal – first place	2022 Tashkent	45 kg
Bronze medal – third place	2020 Tashkent	45 kg

Harshada Garud is a weightlifter from Maharashtra, India. At the 2022 Junior World Weightlifting Championships, she became the first Indian to win a gold medal in International Weightlifting Federation's World Juniors Weightlifting Championships.

== Biography ==
Harshada Garud is born on 8 November 2003, at Vadgaon Maval near Pune, Maharashtra. Harshada's father Sharad Garud, is also a weightlifter, who had won weightlifting silver at state school games. She is studying B.A. at Savitribai Phule Pune University.

== Weightlifting career ==
In 2022, Harshada Garud won gold medal in the World junior weightlifting championships held at Heraklion, Greece. She is the first Indian to win a gold medal in World Juniors Weightlifting Championships. She had also won U-17 girls weightlifting gold medal at the 2020 Khelo India Youth Games and bronze medal at the 2020 Asian junior championships in Tashkent. She also won third rank in 45 kg junior woman category, in IWLF Youth, Junior & Senior National Weightlifting Championships 2021-22 held at Bhubaneswar, Odisha.
