= Juliana Klarisa =

Indonesian weightlifter (born 2002)

Personal information
- Nationality: Indonesian
- Born: 29 July 2002 (age 24) Jambi, Indonesia
- Weight: 54.75 kg (121 lb)

Sport
- Country: Indonesia
- Sport: Weightlifting
- Event: –55 kg
Medal record
Asian Youth & Junior Championship
Silver medal – second place	2020 Tashkent	55kg
Silver medal – second place	2019 Pyongyang	55kg
Southeast Asian Games
Gold medal – first place	2023 Cambodia	55kg
Bronze medal – third place	2019 Philippines	55kg

Juliana Klarisa (born 29 July 2002) is an Indonesian weightlifter. She is a weightlifter competing in the 55 kg class since 2019 Junior World Weightlifting Championships in Suva, Fiji.

== Medal career ==
At the 2019 Asian Youth Weightlifting Championships which was held in Pyongyang, North Korea, she participated in 55 kg class. At that time she finished second below the North Korean lifter, Pak Jin-hae and above the South Korean lifter, Lee Ye-rim with a total lift of 175 kg.

After that she participated in the 2019 Southeast Asian Games which was held in the Philippines with total 175 kg.

Not only that, when she started the first international competition in 2020 at the 2020 Asian Junior Weightlifting Championships which was held in Tashkent, Uzbekistan, she finished second below the Vietnamese lifter, Nguyễn Thị Thủy Tiên and above the Uzbek lifter, Nigora Abdullaeva, with total 182 kg.
