= List of Armenian records in Olympic weightlifting =

The following are the records of Armenia in Olympic weightlifting. Records are maintained in each weight class for the snatch lift, clean and jerk lift, and the total for both lifts by the Weightlifting Federation of Armenia (WFA).

== Current records ==
=== Men ===
Event	Record	Athlete	Date	Meet	Place	Ref
60 kg
Snatch	115 kg	Standard				
Clean & Jerk	145 kg	Standard				
Total	260 kg	Standard				
65 kg
Snatch	125 kg	Standard				
Snatch	130 kg	Garnik Cholakyan	28 October 2026	World Championships	Ningbo, China	
Clean & Jerk	155 kg	Standard				
Total	280 kg	Standard				
Total	285 kg	Garnik Cholakyan	28 October 2026	World Championships	Ningbo, China	
70 kg
Snatch	135 kg	Standard				
Clean & Jerk	165 kg	Standard				
Total	300 kg	Standard				
75 kg
Snatch	145 kg	Standard				
Snatch	146 kg	Narek Grigoryan	14 October 2026	European Junior Championships	Durrës, Albania	
Clean & Jerk	185 kg	Standard				
Total	330 kg	Standard				
85 kg
Snatch	165 kg	Standard				
Clean & Jerk	200 kg	Standard				
Total	365 kg	Standard				
95 kg
Snatch	175 kg	Standard				
Clean & Jerk	210 kg	Standard				
Total	385 kg	Standard				
110 kg
Snatch	185 kg	Standard				
Clean & Jerk	220 kg	Standard				
Total	405 kg	Standard				
+110 kg
Snatch	200 kg	Standard				
Snatch	210 kg	Varazdat Lalayan	8 November 2026	World Championships	Ningbo, China	
Clean & Jerk	240 kg	Standard				
Clean & Jerk	247 kg	Varazdat Lalayan	8 November 2026	World Championships	Ningbo, China	
Total	440 kg	Standard				
Total	457 kg	Varazdat Lalayan	8 November 2026	World Championships	Ningbo, China	

=== Women ===
Event	Record	Athlete	Date	Meet	Place	Ref
49 kg
Snatch	70 kg	Standard				
Clean & Jerk	95 kg	Standard				
Total	165 kg	Standard				
53 kg
Snatch	75 kg	Standard				
Clean & Jerk	100 kg	Standard				
Total	175 kg	Standard				
57 kg
Snatch	80 kg	Standard				
Snatch	90 kg	Aleksandra Grigoryan	14 October 2026	European U23 Championships	Durrës, Albania	
Clean & Jerk	110 kg	Standard				
Clean & Jerk	112 kg	Aleksandra Grigoryan	14 October 2026	European U23 Championships	Durrës, Albania	
Clean & Jerk	120 kg	Aleksandra Grigoryan	30 October 2026	World Championships	Ningbo, China	
Total	190 kg	Standard				
Total	202 kg	Aleksandra Grigoryan	14 October 2026	European U23 Championships	Durrës, Albania	
Total	205 kg	Aleksandra Grigoryan	30 October 2026	World Championships	Ningbo, China	
61 kg
Snatch	85 kg	Standard				
Clean & Jerk	115 kg	Standard				
Total	200 kg	Standard				
69 kg
Snatch	90 kg	Standard				
Clean & Jerk	120 kg	Standard				
Total	210 kg	Standard				
77 kg
Snatch	95 kg	Standard				
Snatch	102 kg	Anna Amroyan	17 October 2026	European Junior Championships	Durrës, Albania	
Clean & Jerk	125 kg	Standard				
Total	220 kg	Standard				
86 kg
Snatch	100 kg	Standard				
Snatch	106 kg	Emma Poghosyan	7 November 2026	World Championships	Ningbo, China	
Clean & Jerk	130 kg	Standard				
Clean & Jerk	143 kg	Emma Poghosyan	7 November 2026	World Championships	Ningbo, China	
Total	230 kg	Standard				
Total	249 kg	Emma Poghosyan	7 November 2026	World Championships	Ningbo, China	
+86 kg
Snatch	110 kg	Standard				
Clean & Jerk	140 kg	Standard				
Total	250 kg	Standard				

== Historical records ==
=== Men (2018–2025) ===
Event	Record	Athlete	Date	Meet	Place	Ref
55 kg
Snatch						
Clean & Jerk						
Total						
61 kg
Snatch						
Clean & Jerk						
Total						
67 kg
Snatch	145 kg	Gor Sahakyan	17 April 2023	European Championships	Yerevan, Armenia	
Clean & Jerk	175 kg	Gor Sahakyan	17 April 2023	European Championships	Yerevan, Armenia	
Total	320 kg	Gor Sahakyan	17 April 2023	European Championships	Yerevan, Armenia	
73 kg
Snatch						
Clean & Jerk						
Total						
81 kg
Snatch	162 kg	Rafik Harutyunyan	11 September 2023	World Championships	Riyadh, Saudi Arabia	
Clean & Jerk	196 kg	Rafik Harutyunyan	7 April 2021	European Championships	Moscow, Russia	
Total	349 kg	Rafik Harutyunyan	12 December 2021	World Championships	Tashkent, Uzbekistan	
89 kg
Snatch	178 kg	Andranik Karapetyan	20 April 2023	European Championships	Yerevan, Armenia	
Clean & Jerk	202 kg	Andranik Karapetyan	11 September 2023	World Championships	Riyadh, Saudi Arabia	
Total	377 kg	Andranik Karapetyan	11 September 2023	World Championships	Riyadh, Saudi Arabia	
96 kg
Snatch	172 kg	Davit Hovhannisyan	21 April 2023	European Championships	Yerevan, Armenia	
Clean & Jerk	209 kg	Hakob Mkrtchyan	18 February 2024	European Championships	Sofia, Bulgaria	
Total	377 kg	Davit Hovhannisyan	21 April 2023	European Championships	Yerevan, Armenia	
102 kg
Snatch	185 kg	Garik Karapetyan	8 April 2024	World Cup	Phuket, Thailand	
Clean & Jerk	216 kg	Samvel Gasparyan	11 April 2021	European Championships	Moscow, Russia	
Total	401 kg	Garik Karapetyan	8 April 2024	World Cup	Phuket, Thailand	
109 kg
Snatch	199 kg	Simon Martirosyan	26 September 2019	World Championships	Pattaya, Thailand	
Clean & Jerk	240 kg	Simon Martirosyan	9 November 2018	World Championships	Ashgabat, Turkmenistan	
Total	435 kg	Simon Martirosyan	9 November 2018	World Championships	Ashgabat, Turkmenistan	
+109 kg
Snatch	216 kg	Gor Minasyan	11 April 2021	European Championships	Moscow, Russia	
Clean & Jerk	253 kg	Varazdat Lalayan	11 April 2024	World Cup	Phuket, Thailand	
Total	464 kg	Gor Minasyan	11 April 2021	European Championships	Moscow, Russia	

=== Women (2018–2025) ===
Event	Record	Athlete	Date	Meet	Place	Ref
45 kg
Snatch						
Clean & Jerk						
Total						
49 kg
Snatch						
Clean & Jerk						
Total						
55 kg
Snatch	88 kg	Aleksandra Grigoryan	1 May 2025	World Junior Championships	Lima, Peru	
Clean & Jerk	120 kg	Aleksandra Grigoryan	8 December 2024	World Championships	Manama, Bahrain	
Total	205 kg	Aleksandra Grigoryan	8 December 2024	World Championships	Manama, Bahrain	
59 kg
Snatch	95 kg	Izabella Yaylyan	27 July 2021	Olympic Games	Tokyo, Japan	
Clean & Jerk	111 kg	Izabella Yaylyan	December 2019	Qatar Cup	Doha, Qatar	
Total	205 kg	Izabella Yaylyan	27 July 2021	Olympic Games	Tokyo, Japan	
64 kg
Snatch	80 kg	Anush Arshakyan	18 April 2023	European Championships	Yerevan, Armenia	
Clean & Jerk	104 kg	Anush Arshakyan	18 April 2023	European Championships	Yerevan, Armenia	
Total	184 kg	Anush Arshakyan	18 April 2023	European Championships	Yerevan, Armenia	
71 kg
Snatch	85 kg	Alina Sukiasyan	8 July 2023	European Youth Championships	Chișinău, Moldova	
Clean & Jerk	100 kg	Alina Sukiasyan	8 July 2023	European Youth Championships	Chișinău, Moldova	
Total	185 kg	Alina Sukiasyan	8 July 2023	European Youth Championships	Chișinău, Moldova	
76 kg
Snatch	104 kg	Tatev Hakobyan	20 April 2023	European Championships	Yerevan, Armenia	
Clean & Jerk	122 kg	Tatev Hakobyan	20 April 2023	European Championships	Yerevan, Armenia	
Total	226 kg	Tatev Hakobyan	20 April 2023	European Championships	Yerevan, Armenia	
81 kg
Snatch	105 kg	Tatev Hakobyan	15 December 2021	World Championships	Tashkent, Uzbekistan	
Clean & Jerk	129 kg	Emma Poghosyan	9 July 2023	European Youth Championships	Chișinău, Moldova	
Total	230 kg	Tatev Hakobyan	15 December 2021	World Championships	Tashkent, Uzbekistan	
87 kg
Snatch	107 kg	Hripsime Khurshudyan	22 April 2023	European Championships	Yerevan, Armenia	
Clean & Jerk	132 kg	Tatev Hakobyan	15 September 2023	World Championships	Riyadh, Saudi Arabia	
Total	237 kg	Tatev Hakobyan	15 September 2023	World Championships	Riyadh, Saudi Arabia	
+87 kg
Snatch	95 kg	Julieta Avanesyan	23 April 2023	European Championships	Yerevan, Armenia	
Clean & Jerk	116 kg	Julieta Avanesyan	23 April 2023	European Championships	Yerevan, Armenia	
Total	211 kg	Julieta Avanesyan	23 April 2023	European Championships	Yerevan, Armenia	

=== Men (1998–2018) ===
Event	Record	Athlete	Date	Meet	Place	Ref
56 kg
Snatch						
Clean & Jerk						
Total						
62 kg
Snatch						
Clean & Jerk						
Total						
69 kg
Snatch						
Clean & Jerk						
Total						
77 kg
Snatch	174 kg	Andranik Karapetyan	10 August 2016	Olympic Games	Rio de Janeiro, Brazil	
Clean & Jerk	200 kg	Tigran Gevorg Martirosyan	23 September 2010	World Championships	Antalya, Turkey	
Total	373 kg	Tigran Gevorg Martirosyan	23 September 2010	World Championships	Antalya, Turkey	
85 kg
Snatch						
Clean & Jerk						
Total						
94 kg
Snatch						
Clean & Jerk						
Total						
105 kg
Snatch	190 kg	Simon Martirosyan	15 August 2016	Olympic Games	Rio de Janeiro, Brazil	
Clean & Jerk	230 kg	Simon Martirosyan	8 April 2017	European Championships	Split, Croatia	
Total	417 kg	Simon Martirosyan	15 August 2016	Olympic Games	Rio de Janeiro, Brazil	
+105 kg
Snatch	211 kg	Gor Minasyan	8 April 2017	European Championships	Split, Croatia	
Clean & Jerk	252 kg	Ashot Danielyan	26 April 2000	European Championships	Sofia, Bulgaria	
Total	457 kg	Ashot Danielyan	26 April 2000	European Championships	Sofia, Bulgaria	

=== Women (1998–2018) ===
Event	Record	Athlete	Date	Meet	Place	Ref
48 kg
Snatch						
Clean & Jerk						
Total						
53 kg
Snatch						
Clean & Jerk						
Total						
58 kg
Snatch						
Clean & Jerk						
Total						
63 kg
Snatch						
Clean & Jerk						
Total						
69 kg
Snatch						
Clean & Jerk						
Total						
75 kg
Snatch						
Clean & Jerk						
Total						
90 kg
Snatch	128 kg	Hripsime Khurshudyan	5 August 2012	Olympic Games	London, Great Britain	
Clean & Jerk	166 kg	Hripsime Khurshudyan	5 August 2012	Olympic Games	London, Great Britain	
Total	294 kg	Hripsime Khurshudyan	5 August 2012	Olympic Games	London, Great Britain	
+90 kg
Snatch						
Clean & Jerk						
Total						
