= List of Belgian records in Olympic weightlifting =

The following are the national records in Olympic weightlifting in Belgium. Records are maintained in each weight class for the snatch lift, clean and jerk lift, and the total for both lifts by the Royal Belgian Weightlifting Federation.

== Current records ==
Key to tables: Awaiting ratification Not ratified or later rescinded by Royal Belgian Weightlifting Federation

=== Men ===
| Event | Record | Athlete | Date | Meet | Place | Ref |
60 kg
| Snatch | 87 kg | Standard | | | | |
| Clean & Jerk | 107 kg | Standard | | | | |
| Total | 195 kg | Standard | | | | |
65 kg
| Snatch | 105 kg | Atilla Aydogan | 1 March 2025 | | Comines, France | |
| Clean & Jerk | 125 kg | Atilla Aydogan | 1 March 2025 | | Comines, France | |
| Total | 230 kg | Atilla Aydogan | 1 March 2025 | | Comines, France | |
70 kg
| Snatch | 110 kg | Atilla Aydogan | 1 September 2024 | | Fléron, Belgium | |
| Clean & Jerk | 130 kg | Atilla Aydogan | 1 September 2024 | | Fléron, Belgium | |
| Total | 240 kg | Atilla Aydogan | 1 September 2024 | | Fléron, Belgium | |
75 kg
| Snatch | 112 kg | Atilla Aydogan | 14 March 2026 | | Seraing, Belgium | |
| Clean & Jerk | 134 kg | Santiago Garcia | 12 September 2026 | | Oupeye, Belgium | |
| Total | 245 kg | Atilla Aydogan | 14 March 2026 | | Seraing, Belgium | |
85 kg
| Snatch | 140 kg | Burak Süngü | 2 February 2019 | | Waregem, Belgium | |
| Clean & Jerk | 160 kg | Burak Süngü | 2 February 2019 | | Waregem, Belgium | |
| Total | 300 kg | Burak Süngü | 2 February 2019 | | Waregem, Belgium | |
95 kg
| Snatch | 161 kg | Burak Süngü | 17 November 2019 | Naim Suleymanoglu Tournament | Gaziantep, Turkey | |
| Clean & Jerk | 180 kg | Burak Süngü | 17 November 2019 | Naim Suleymanoglu Tournament | Gaziantep, Turkey | |
| Total | 341 kg | Burak Süngü | 17 November 2019 | Naim Suleymanoglu Tournament | Gaziantep, Turkey | |
110 kg
| Snatch | 156 kg | Burak Süngü | 13 March 2026 | | Ghent, Belgium | |
| Clean & Jerk | 191 kg | Seppe Housen | 9 March 2025 | | Auderghem, Belgium | |
| Total | 336 kg | Burak Süngü | 29 November 2025 | Belgium Championships | Ixelles, Belgium | |
+110 kg
| Snatch | 149 kg | Seppe Housen | 12 September 2026 | | Oupeye, Belgium | |
| Clean & Jerk | 190 kg | Seppe Housen | 14 March 2026 | | Seraing, Belgium | |
| Total | 335 kg | Seppe Housen | 14 March 2026 | | Seraing, Belgium | |

=== Women ===
| Event | Record | Athlete | Date | Meet | Place | Ref |
49 kg
| Snatch | 89 kg | Nina Sterckx | 6 December 2022 | World Championships | Bogotá, Colombia | |
| Clean & Jerk | 104 kg | Nina Sterckx | 6 December 2022 | World Championships | Bogotá, Colombia | |
| Total | 193 kg | Nina Sterckx | 6 December 2022 | World Championships | Bogotá, Colombia | |
53 kg
| Snatch | 94 kg | Nina Sterckx | 19 April 2026 | European Championships | Batumi, Georgia | |
| Clean & Jerk | 116 kg | Nina Sterckx | 19 April 2026 | European Championships | Batumi, Georgia | |
| Total | 210 kg | Nina Sterckx | 19 April 2026 | European Championships | Batumi, Georgia | |
57 kg
| Snatch | 98 kg | Nina Sterckx | 26 May 2024 | | Seraing, Belgium | |
| Clean & Jerk | 120 kg | Nina Sterckx | 26 May 2024 | | Seraing, Belgium | |
| Total | 218 kg | Nina Sterckx | 26 May 2024 | | Seraing, Belgium | |
61 kg
| Snatch | 102 kg | Nina Sterckx | 3 February 2024 | | Ghent, Belgium | |
| Clean & Jerk | 123 kg | Nina Sterckx | 25 November 2023 | | Ghent, Belgium | |
| Total | 224 kg | Nina Sterckx | 25 November 2023 | | Ghent, Belgium | |
69 kg
| Snatch | 98 kg | Nina Sterckx | 25 June 2026 | | Colorado Springs, United States | |
| Clean & Jerk | 122 kg | Nina Sterckx | 25 June 2026 | | Colorado Springs, United States | |
| Total | 220 kg | Nina Sterckx | 25 June 2026 | | Colorado Springs, United States | |
77 kg
| Snatch | 96 kg | Roos Van Beers | 22 August 2026 | | Aalst, Belgium | |
| Clean & Jerk | 118 kg | Manon Angonese | 11 September 2021 | | Tournai, Belgium | |
| Total | 208 kg | Manon Angonese | 11 September 2021 | | Tournai, Belgium | |
86 kg
| Snatch | 106 kg | Ilke Lagrou | 17 March 2024 | | Houthalen-Helchteren, Belgium | |
| Snatch | 113 kg | Ilke Lagrou | 7 November 2026 | World Championships | Ningbo, China | |
| Clean & Jerk | 134 kg | Ilke Lagrou | 19 April 2025 | European Championships | Chișinău, Moldova | |
| Total | 238 kg | Ilke Lagrou | 19 April 2025 | European Championships | Chișinău, Moldova | |
+86 kg
| Snatch | 111 kg | Ilke Lagrou | 20 June 2026 | | Comines, France | |
| Clean & Jerk | 135 kg | Ilke Lagrou | 1 March 2026 | | Houthalen-Helchteren, Belgium | |
| Total | 244 kg | Ilke Lagrou | 26 September 2026 | Blue Swords Cup | Meissen, Germany | |

== Historical records ==
=== Men (2025–2026) ===
| Event | Record | Athlete | Date | Meet | Place | Ref |
71 kg
| Snatch | 111 kg | Santiago Garcia | 30 November 2025 | Belgium Championships | Ixelles, Belgium | |
| Clean & Jerk | 130 kg | Atilla Aydogan | 1 September 2024 | | Fléron, Belgium | |
| Total | 240 kg | Atilla Aydogan | 1 September 2024 | | Fléron, Belgium | |
79 kg
| Snatch | 121 kg | Loric Peters | 24 May 2026 | | Seraing, Belgium | |
| Clean & Jerk | 152 kg | Loric Peters | 30 November 2025 | Belgium Championships | Ixelles, Belgium | |
| Total | 272 kg | Loric Peters | 20 June 2026 | | Comines, France | |
88 kg
| Snatch | 148 kg | Burak Süngü | 10 April 2019 | European Championships | Batumi, Georgia | |
| Clean & Jerk | 174 kg | Youssef El Amrani | 6 April 2025 | | Oupeye, Belgium | |
| Total | 318 kg | Burak Süngü | 10 April 2019 | European Championships | Batumi, Georgia | |
94 kg
| Snatch | 161 kg | Burak Süngü | 17 November 2019 | Naim Suleymanoglu Tournament | Gaziantep, Turkey | |
| Clean & Jerk | 180 kg | Burak Süngü | 17 November 2019 | Naim Suleymanoglu Tournament | Gaziantep, Turkey | |
| Total | 341 kg | Burak Süngü | 17 November 2019 | Naim Suleymanoglu Tournament | Gaziantep, Turkey | |

=== Men (2018–2025) ===
| Event | Record | Athlete | Date | Meet | Place | Ref |
55 kg
| Snatch | 83 kg | Standard | | | | |
| Clean & Jerk | 101 kg | Standard | | | | |
| Total | 184 kg | Standard | | | | |
61 kg
| Snatch | 90 kg | Jens Van Beek | | | | |
| Clean & Jerk | 113 kg | Jens Van Beek | | | | |
| Total | 203 kg | Jens Van Beek | | | | |
67 kg
| Snatch | 110 kg | Atilla Aydogan | 1 September 2024 | | Fléron, Belgium | |
| Clean & Jerk | 130 kg | Atilla Aydogan | 1 September 2024 | | Fléron, Belgium | |
| Total | 240 kg | Atilla Aydogan | 1 September 2024 | | Fléron, Belgium | |
73 kg
| Snatch | 110 kg | Atilla Aydogan | | | | |
| Clean & Jerk | 130 kg | Loric Peters | | | | |
| Total | 235 kg | Atilla Aydogan | | | | |
81 kg
| Snatch | 125 kg | Youssef El Amrani | | | | |
| Clean & Jerk | 155 kg | Youssef El Amrani | | | | |
| Total | 275 kg | Youssef El Amrani | | | | |
89 kg
| Snatch | 158 kg | Burak Süngü | | | | |
| Clean & Jerk | 178 kg | Burak Süngü | | | | |
| Total | 336 kg | Burak Süngü | | | | |
96 kg
| Snatch | 161 kg | Burak Süngü | 17 November 2019 | Naim Suleymanoglu Tournament | Gaziantep, Turkey | |
| Clean & Jerk | 180 kg | Burak Süngü | 17 November 2019 | Naim Suleymanoglu Tournament | Gaziantep, Turkey | |
| Total | 341 kg | Burak Süngü | 17 November 2019 | Naim Suleymanoglu Tournament | Gaziantep, Turkey | |
102 kg
| Snatch | 145 kg | Burak Süngü | | | | |
| Clean & Jerk | 187 kg | Seppe Housen | | | | |
| Total | 324 kg | Seppe Housen | | | | |
109 kg
| Snatch | 143 kg | Seppe Housen | 9 March 2025 | | Auderghem, Belgium | |
| Clean & Jerk | 191 kg | Seppe Housen | 9 March 2025 | | Auderghem, Belgium | |
| Total | 334 kg | Seppe Housen | 9 March 2025 | | Auderghem, Belgium | |
+109 kg
| Snatch | 126 kg | Tom Van Thienen | 12 February 2019 | | Comines, France | |
| Clean & Jerk | 159 kg | Nik Van Oppens | 6 August 2023 | | Houthalen, Belgium | |
| Total | 283 kg | Tom Van Thienen | 12 February 2019 | | Comines, France | |

=== Men (1998–2018) ===
| Event | Record | Athlete | Date | Meet | Place | Ref |
56 kg
| Snatch | 116 kg | Tom Goegebuer | 2 April 2010 | European Championships | Minsk, Belarus | |
| Clean & Jerk | 140 kg | Tom Goegebuer | 11 April 2011 | European Championships | Kazan, Russia | |
| Total | 254 kg | Tom Goegebuer | 2 April 2010 | European Championships | Minsk, Belarus | |
62 kg
| Snatch | 127.5 kg | Tom Goegebuer | | | | |
| Clean & Jerk | 155 kg | Tom Goegebuer | | | | |
| Total | 277.5 kg | Tom Goegebuer | | | | |
69 kg
| Snatch | 145 kg | François Demeure | 12 November 1998 | World Championships | Lahti, Finland | |
| Clean & Jerk | 177.5 kg | François Demeure | 12 November 1998 | World Championships | Lahti, Finland | |
| Total | 322.5 kg | François Demeure | 12 November 1998 | World Championships | Lahti, Finland | |
77 kg
| Snatch | 140 kg | François Demeure | | | | |
| Clean & Jerk | 175 kg | François Demeure | | | | |
| Total | 315 kg | François Demeure | | | | |
85 kg
| Snatch | 125 kg | Nicky Van Wemmel | | | | |
| Clean & Jerk | 165 kg | Nicky Van Wemmel | | | | |
| Total | 290 kg | Nicky Van Wemmel | | | | |
94 kg
| Snatch | 128 kg | Tom Van Thienen | | | | |
| Clean & Jerk | 150 kg | Tom Van Thienen | | | | |
| Total | 275 kg | Tom Van Thienen | | | | |
105 kg
| Snatch | 136 kg | Tom Van Thienen | | | | |
| Clean & Jerk | 164 kg | Tom Van Thienen | | | | |
| Total | 295 kg | Tom Van Thienen | | | | |
+105 kg
| Snatch | 135 kg | Tom Van Thienen | | | | |
| Clean & Jerk | 168 kg | Tom Van Thienen | | | | |
| Total | 300 kg | Tom Van Thienen | | | | |

=== Women (2025–2026) ===
| Event | Record | Athlete | Date | Meet | Place | Ref |
48 kg
| Snatch | 58 kg | Standard | | | | |
| Clean & Jerk | 71 kg | Standard | | | | |
| Total | 129 kg | Standard | | | | |
58 kg
| Snatch | 98 kg | Nina Sterckx | 26 May 2024 | | Seraing, Belgium | |
| Clean & Jerk | 120 kg | Nina Sterckx | 26 May 2024 | | Seraing, Belgium | |
| Total | 218 kg | Nina Sterckx | 26 May 2024 | | Seraing, Belgium | |
63 kg
| Snatch | 102 kg | Nina Sterckx | 3 February 2024 | | Ghent, Belgium | |
| Clean & Jerk | 123 kg | Nina Sterckx | 25 November 2023 | | Ghent, Belgium | |
| Total | 224 kg | Nina Sterckx | 25 November 2023 | | Ghent, Belgium | |

=== Women (2018–2025) ===
| Event | Record | Athlete | Date | Meet | Place | Ref |
45 kg
| Snatch | 55 kg | Standard | | | | |
| Clean & Jerk | 68 kg | Standard | | | | |
| Total | 123 kg | Standard | | | | |
49 kg
| Snatch | 89 kg | Nina Sterckx | 6 December 2022 | World Championships | Bogotá, Colombia | |
| Clean & Jerk | 104 kg | Nina Sterckx | 6 December 2022 | World Championships | Bogotá, Colombia | |
| Total | 193 kg | Nina Sterckx | 6 December 2022 | World Championships | Bogotá, Colombia | |
55 kg
| Snatch | 95 kg | Nina Sterckx | 17 October 2022 | European Junior Championships | Durrës, Albania | |
| Clean & Jerk | 118 kg | Nina Sterckx | 17 October 2022 | European Junior Championships | Durrës, Albania | |
| Total | 213 kg | Nina Sterckx | 17 October 2022 | European Junior Championships | Durrës, Albania | |
59 kg
| Snatch | 102 kg | Nina Sterckx | | | | |
| Clean & Jerk | 122 kg | Nina Sterckx | | | | |
| Total | 221 kg | Nina Sterckx | | | | |
64 kg
| Snatch | 101 kg | Nina Sterckx | | | | |
| Clean & Jerk | 123 kg | Nina Sterckx | 25 November 2023 | | Ghent, Belgium | |
| Total | 224 kg | Nina Sterckx | 25 November 2023 | | Ghent, Belgium | |
71 kg
| Snatch | 95 kg | Manon Angonese | 13 December 2021 | World Championships | Tashkent, Uzbekistan | |
| Clean & Jerk | 118 kg | Manon Angonese | | | | |
| Total | 208 kg | Manon Angonese | | | | |
76 kg
| Snatch | 91 kg | Morgane Thyssens | | | | |
| Clean & Jerk | 110 kg | Morgane Thyssens | | | | |
| Total | 200 kg | Morgane Thyssens | | | | |
81 kg
| Snatch | 106 kg | Ilke Lagrou | | | | |
| Clean & Jerk | 134 kg | Ilke Lagrou | 19 April 2025 | European Championships | Chișinău, Moldova | |
| Total | 238 kg | Ilke Lagrou | 19 April 2025 | European Championships | Chișinău, Moldova | |
87 kg
| Snatch | 105 kg | Anna Van Bellinghen | | | | |
| Clean & Jerk | 131 kg | Ilke Lagrou | | | | |
| Total | 231 kg | Ilke Lagrou | | | | |
+87 kg
| Snatch | 98 kg | Anna Van Bellinghen | 13 May 2021 | | Cali, Colombia | |
| Clean & Jerk | 123 kg | Anna Van Bellinghen | 2 August 2021 | Olympic Games | Tokyo, Japan | |
| Total | 219 kg | Anna Van Bellinghen | 2 August 2021 | Olympic Games | Tokyo, Japan | |

=== Women (1998–2018) ===
| Event | Record | Athlete | Date | Meet | Place | Ref |
48 kg
| Snatch | 66 kg | Nina Sterckx | September 2017 | European U15 Championships | Pristina, Kosovo | |
| Clean & Jerk | 83 kg | Nina Sterckx | September 2017 | European U15 Championships | Pristina, Kosovo | |
| Total | 149 kg | Nina Sterckx | September 2017 | European U15 Championships | Pristina, Kosovo | |
53 kg
| Snatch | 77 kg | Nina Sterckx | | | | |
| Clean & Jerk | 97 kg | Nina Sterckx | | | | |
| Total | 174 kg | Nina Sterckx | | | | |
58 kg
| Snatch | 81 kg | Nina Sterckx | | | | |
| Clean & Jerk | 110 kg | Ingeborg Marx | 22 November 1999 | World Championships | Piraeus, Greece | |
| Total | 190 kg | Ingeborg Marx | 22 November 1999 | World Championships | Piraeus, Greece | |
63 kg
| Snatch | 80 kg | Ingeborg Marx | | | | |
| Clean & Jerk | 105 kg | Ingeborg Marx | | | | |
| Total | 180 kg | Ingeborg Marx | | | | |
69 kg
| Snatch | 80 kg | Manon Angonese | | | | |
| Clean & Jerk | 105 kg | Manon Angonese | | | | |
| Total | 185 kg | Manon Angonese | | | | |
75 kg
| Snatch | 96 kg | Anna Van Bellinghen | | | | |
| Clean & Jerk | 122 kg | Anna Van Bellinghen | April 2016 | European Championships | Førde, Norway | |
| Total | 214 kg | Anna Van Bellinghen | April 2016 | European Championships | Førde, Norway | |
90 kg
| Snatch | 110 kg | Anna Van Bellinghen | | | | |
| Clean & Jerk | 132 kg | Anna Van Bellinghen | 27 August 2016 | Women Only | Ixelles, Belgium | |
| Total | 236 kg | Anna Van Bellinghen | 18 February 2017 | Grand Prix de France | Anse, France | |
+90 kg
| Snatch | | | | | | |
| Clean & Jerk | | | | | | |
| Total | | | | | | |
