= Ilke Lagrou =

Belgian weightlifter (born 1998)

Personal information
- Citizenship: Belgian
- Born: 27 January 1998 (age 28)
- Home town: Torhout, Belgium
- Occupation: Physiotherapist

Sport
- Country: Belgium
- Sport: Hammer throw, Weightlifting
- Weight class: 81 kg
- Club: Koninklijke Olympic Gent vzw
- Coached by: Tom Goegebuer and Bieke Vandenabeele
Medal record
Women's weightlifting
Representing Belgium
European Championships
Silver medal – second place	2025 Chișinău	81 kg

Ilke Lagrou (born 27 January 1998) started her athletics career as a Belgian hammer thrower but converted to become a weightlifter. She is a silver medalist at the European Weightlifting Championships.

== Career ==
Lagrou picked up hammer throwing at around the age of 12. Later she also competed in the heptathlon but the main focus remained on the hammer throw. She holds all four national titles in age categories U16 through U23 in the hammer throw.

Sensing no more progress in her performances, she switched to weightlifting in September 2022 and a mere 1.5 years later she surprised herself by picking up a bronze medal in the snatch at the 2024 European Weightlifting Championships held in Sofia, Bulgaria. One year later, in April 2025, she won the silver medal in the women's 81 kg event at the 2025 European Weightlifting Championships held in Chișinău, Moldova. The latter result was all the more surprising, coming after breaking a foot in August 2024, and then tearing a shoulder muscle at a training camp in January 2025. She was given the all-clear to compete by her doctor, but only after her coach Bieke Vandenabeele took instructions on how to replace a dislocated shoulder “just in case”.

== Achievements ==
Year	Venue	Weight	Snatch (kg)				Clean & Jerk (kg)				Total	Rank
Year	Venue	Weight	1	2	3	Rank	1	2	3	Rank	Total	Rank
European Championships
2024	Sofia, Bulgaria	81 kg	97	100	103	3rd place, bronze medalist(s)	~~123~~	~~125~~	~~125~~	—	—	—
2025	Chișinău, Moldova	81 kg	98	101	104	5	~~128~~	128	134	2nd place, silver medalist(s)	238 NR	2nd place, silver medalist(s)
