= 2019 World Weightlifting Championships – Women's 81 kg =

The women's 81 kg competition at the 2019 World Weightlifting Championships was held on 25 September 2019.

== Schedule ==
Date	Time	Event
25 September 2019	10:00	Group B
25 September 2019	17:55	Group A

== Medalists ==
Event	Gold		Silver		Bronze	
Snatch	Lee Ji-eun (KOR)	111 kg	Kim Su-hyeon (KOR)	111 kg	Mönkhjantsangiin Ankhtsetseg (MGL)	110 kg
Clean & Jerk	Leydi Solís (COL)	142 kg	Jenny Arthur (USA)	139 kg	Lydia Valentín (ESP)	138 kg
Total	Leydi Solís (COL)	247 kg	Lydia Valentín (ESP)	246 kg	Jenny Arthur (USA)	245 kg

== Records ==
Prior to this competition, the existing world records were as follows.

World Record	Snatch	World Standard	127 kg	—	1 November 2018
World Record	Clean & Jerk	World Standard	158 kg	—	1 November 2018
World Record	Total	World Standard	283 kg	—	1 November 2018

== Results ==
Rank	Athlete	Group	Snatch (kg)				Clean & Jerk (kg)				Total
Rank	Athlete	Group	1	2	3	Rank	1	2	3	Rank	Total
1st place, gold medalist(s)	Leydi Solís (COL)	A	105	~~108~~	~~108~~	9	136	139	142	1st place, gold medalist(s)	247
2nd place, silver medalist(s)	Lydia Valentín (ESP)	A	105	108	~~112~~	5	130	134	138	3rd place, bronze medalist(s)	246
3rd place, bronze medalist(s)	Jenny Arthur (USA)	A	102	106	~~110~~	7	~~132~~	134	139	2nd place, silver medalist(s)	245
4	Darya Naumava (BLR)	A	105	109	~~112~~	4	135	~~138~~	~~138~~	5	244
5	Dayana Chirinos (VEN)	A	103	~~106~~	106	8	133	136	~~139~~	4	242
6	Lee Ji-eun (KOR)	B	102	108	111	1st place, gold medalist(s)	117	123	127	10	238
7	Valeria Rivas (COL)	A	102	106	~~108~~	6	126	130	132	7	238
8	Mönkhjantsangiin Ankhtsetseg (MGL)	B	101	107	110	3rd place, bronze medalist(s)	123	127	~~131~~	9	237
9	Anacarmen Torres (MEX)	A	~~101~~	101	~~103~~	11	130	133	~~136~~	6	234
10	Tatev Hakobyan (ARM)	A	100	~~105~~	105	10	115	121	~~125~~	13	226
11	Gaëlle Nayo-Ketchanke (FRA)	B	85	90	95	14	120	125	130	8	225
12	Alejandra Garza (MEX)	A	97	100	~~103~~	12	123	~~126~~	~~126~~	12	223
13	Ekaterina Katina (RUS)	B	90	93	95	15	120	126	~~131~~	11	221
14	Tímea Szuromi (HUN)	B	90	93	95	16	110	114	118	14	213
15	Lenka Rojas (CHI)	B	82	85	~~87~~	17	110	116	~~120~~	15	201
16	Mai Al-Madani (UAE)	B	62	~~64~~	64	18	80	82	~~86~~	18	146
—	Kim Su-hyeon (KOR)	A	106	~~110~~	111	2nd place, silver medalist(s)	~~137~~	~~137~~	~~138~~	—	—
—	Anna Van Bellinghen (BEL)	B	99	~~102~~	~~102~~	13	~~117~~	~~118~~	~~118~~	—	—
—	Michaela Skleničková (CZE)	B	~~80~~	~~80~~	~~80~~	—	102	106	~~109~~	16	—
—	Rayen Cupid (VIN)	B	~~87~~	~~87~~	~~88~~	—	103	~~107~~	~~107~~	17	—
