= Nadiia Shpilka =

Ukrainian weightlifter

Sport
- Country: Ukraine
- Sport: Weightlifting
- Weight class: 59 kg
Medal record
Women's weightlifting
Representing Ukraine
European Championships
Bronze medal – third place	2023 Yerevan	55 kg

Nadiia Shpilka (Ukrainian: Надія Шпилька, born in Khmelnytskyi Oblast) is a Ukrainian weightlifter. At the age of 29, she won bronze at the 2023 European Championships in Yerevan, Armenia. She was third behind her teammate Kamila Konotop and Belgium's Nina Sterckx. She also won the bronze medals in the Snatch and Clean & Jerk events.

== Achievements ==
Year	Venue	Weight	Snatch (kg)				Clean & Jerk (kg)				Total	Rank
Year	Venue	Weight	1	2	3	Rank	1	2	3	Rank	Total	Rank
European Championships
2023	Yerevan, Armenia	59 kg	93	~~96~~	~~96~~	3rd place, bronze medalist(s)	114	~~117~~	~~117~~	3rd place, bronze medalist(s)	207	3rd place, bronze medalist(s)
