= Valeria Rivas =

Colombian weightlifter (born 2000)

Personal information
- Full name: Valeria Rivas Mosquera
- Born: 23 April 2000 (age 26)

Sport
- Country: Colombia
- Sport: Weightlifting
- Weight class: 69 kg; 81 kg; 86 kg; 87 kg
Medal record
Representing Colombia
Women's weightlifting
World Championships
Silver medal – second place	2021 Tashkent	81 kg
Pan American Championships
Gold medal – first place	2021 Guayaquil	81 kg
Silver medal – second place	2026 Panama City	86 kg
Bronze medal – third place	2025 Cali	86 kg
Bolivarian Games
Silver medal – second place	2022 Valledupar	81 kg S
Silver medal – second place	2022 Valledupar	81 kg CJ
Youth World Championships
Silver medal – second place	2017 Bangkok	69 kg

Valeria Rivas Mosquera (born 23 April 2000) is a Colombian weightlifter. She won the silver medal in the women's 81 kg event at the 2021 World Weightlifting Championships held in Tashkent, Uzbekistan. She won two silver medals at the 2022 Bolivarian Games held in Valledupar, Colombia.

She won the gold medal in the women's 81 kg event at the 2021 Pan American Weightlifting Championships held in Guayaquil, Ecuador.

== Achievements ==
Year	Venue	Weight	Snatch (kg)				Clean & Jerk (kg)				Total	Rank
Year	Venue	Weight	1	2	3	Rank	1	2	3	Rank	Total	Rank
Representing Colombia
World Championships
2019	Pattaya, Thailand	81 kg	102	106	~~108~~	6	126	130	132	7	238	7
2021	Tashkent, Uzbekistan	81 kg	105	~~109~~	~~109~~	4	130	134	~~136~~	2nd place, silver medalist(s)	239	2nd place, silver medalist(s)
2024	Manama, Bahrain	81 kg	107	~~110~~	~~112~~	7	~~138~~	~~138~~	~~138~~	—N/a	—N/a	—N/a
2025	Førde, Norway	86 kg	~~109~~	110	~~113~~	7	~~138~~	~~138~~	~~138~~	—N/a	—N/a	—N/a
Pan American Championships
2020	Santo Domingo, Dominican Republic	87 kg	103	106	108	6	125	130	~~133~~	5	238	5
2021	Guayaquil, Ecuador	81 kg	104	~~107~~	107	2nd place, silver medalist(s)	128	133	135	1st place, gold medalist(s)	242	1st place, gold medalist(s)
2025	Cali, Colombia	86 kg	108	111	~~114~~	2nd place, silver medalist(s)	138	142	~~145~~	3rd place, bronze medalist(s)	253	3rd place, bronze medalist(s)
2026	Panama City, Panama	86 kg	107	~~110~~	~~110~~	3rd place, bronze medalist(s)	133	~~138~~	~~140~~	2nd place, silver medalist(s)	240	2nd place, silver medalist(s)
Bolivarian Games
2022	Valledupar, Colombia	81 kg	105	~~110~~	110	2nd place, silver medalist(s)	~~130~~	130	—	2nd place, silver medalist(s)	—N/a	—N/a
Youth World Championships
2017	Bangkok, Thailand	69 kg	90	93	95	2nd place, silver medalist(s)	109	~~114~~	114	2nd place, silver medalist(s)	209	2nd place, silver medalist(s)
