= Batu Han Yüksel =

Turkish weightlifter (born 1999)

Personal information
- Nationality: Turkish
- Born: 4 October 1999 (age 26) Ankara, Turkey
- Height: 1.75 m (5 ft 9 in)
- Weight: 81 kg (179 lb)

Sport
- Country: Turkey
- Sport: Weightlifting
- Event: 81–kg
- Club: Pursaklar Belediye S.K.
Medal record
Men's weightlifting
Representing Turkey
European Championships
Silver medal – second place	2023 Yerevan	81 kg
2uropean Junior & U23 Championships
Bronze medal – third place	2019 Bucharest	73 kg

Batu Han Yüksel (born 4 October 1999), also known as Batuhan Yüksel, is a Turkish weight lifter competing in the 81 kg division.

== Personal life ==
Batu Han Yüksel was born in Ankara, Turkey on 4 October 1999.

== Sport career ==
Yüksel is a member of Pursaklar Belediye Sports Club in Ankara.

He placed eight in the 62 kg division at the 2016 European Youth Weightlifting Championships in Nowy Tomyśl, Poland. He competed in the Juniors category at the 2019 European Junior & U23 Weightlifting Championships held in Bucharest, Romania, and took the silver medal in the clean & jerk event and the bronze medal in total. At the 2022 European Weightlifting Championships in Tirana, Albania, he ranked 7th n the 73 kg division. In 2022, he competed in the 81 kg division at the Islamic Solidarity Games in Konya, Turkey. He won the silver medal in the 81 kg snatch event, the bronze medal in the clean & jerk and became silver medalist in total at the 2023 European Weightlifting Championships in Yerevan, Armenia.

In September 2023, Yüksel was issued with an eight-year ban for an anti-doping rule violation after testing positive for oxymetholone.

== Achievements ==
Year	Competition	Venue	Weight	Snatch		Clean & Jerk		Total	
Year	Competition	Venue	Weight	(kg)	Rank	(kg)	Rank	(kg)	Rank
2019	European Junior & U23 Championships	Bucharest, Romania	73 kg	135	5th	177	2nd place, silver medalist(s)	312	3rd place, bronze medalist(s)
2023	European Championships	Yerevan, Armenia	81 kg	152	2nd place, silver medalist(s)	187	3rd place, bronze medalist(s)	339	2nd place, silver medalist(s)
