= 2023 European Weightlifting Championships =

Weightlifting competition held in Yerevan, Armenia

- Venue: Karen Demirchyan Complex
- Location: Yerevan, Armenia
- Dates: 15–23 April
- Competitors: 310 from 39 nations

The 2023 European Weightlifting Championships was held in Yerevan, Armenia, from 15 to 23 April 2023.

== Medal table ==
Ranking by Big (Total result) medals

* Host nation (Armenia)

| Rank | Nation | Gold | Silver | Bronze | Total |
|---|---|---|---|---|---|
| 1 | Armenia* | 4 | 4 | 5 | 13 |
| 2 | Romania | 3 | 1 | 1 | 5 |
| 3 | Georgia | 2 | 4 | 0 | 6 |
| 4 | Ukraine | 2 | 3 | 3 | 8 |
| 5 | Turkey | 2 | 2 | 1 | 5 |
| 6 | Bulgaria | 2 | 0 | 1 | 3 |
| 7 | Italy | 1 | 3 | 2 | 6 |
| 8 | Great Britain | 1 | 0 | 2 | 3 |
| 9 | Latvia | 1 | 0 | 1 | 2 |
| 10 | France | 1 | 0 | 0 | 1 |
| 10 | Norway | 1 | 0 | 0 | 1 |
| 12 | Spain | 0 | 2 | 1 | 3 |
| 13 | Belgium | 0 | 1 | 0 | 1 |
| 14 | Moldova | 0 | 0 | 3 | 3 |
| Totals (14 entries) | | 20 | 20 | 20 | 60 |

Ranking by all medals: Big (Total result) and Small (Snatch and Clean & Jerk)

* Host nation (Armenia)

| Rank | Nation | Gold | Silver | Bronze | Total |
|---|---|---|---|---|---|
| 1 | Armenia* | 12 | 11 | 13 | 36 |
| 2 | Romania | 9 | 3 | 2 | 14 |
| 3 | Georgia | 8 | 7 | 2 | 17 |
| 4 | Turkey | 6 | 10 | 6 | 22 |
| 5 | Ukraine | 6 | 8 | 7 | 21 |
| 6 | Italy | 5 | 7 | 4 | 16 |
| 7 | Bulgaria | 4 | 2 | 5 | 11 |
| 8 | Great Britain | 3 | 1 | 2 | 6 |
| 9 | Norway | 3 | 1 | 0 | 4 |
| 10 | France | 3 | 0 | 0 | 3 |
| 11 | Latvia | 1 | 2 | 3 | 6 |
| 12 | Spain | 0 | 3 | 4 | 7 |
| 13 | Belgium | 0 | 3 | 0 | 3 |
| 14 | Moldova | 0 | 1 | 4 | 5 |
| 15 | Germany | 0 | 1 | 3 | 4 |
| 16 | Austria | 0 | 0 | 3 | 3 |
| 17 | Ireland | 0 | 0 | 1 | 1 |
| 17 | Israel | 0 | 0 | 1 | 1 |
| Totals (18 entries) | | 60 | 60 | 60 | 180 |

== Schedule ==
Men's events
| Date → Event ↓ | 15 | 16 | 17 | 18 | 19 | 20 | 21 | 22 | 23 |
|---|---|---|---|---|---|---|---|---|---|
| 55 kg | | ● | | | | | | | |
| 61 kg | | ● | | | | | | | |
| 67 kg | | | ● | | | | | | |
| 73 kg | | | | ● | | | | | |
| 81 kg | | | | | ● | | | | |
| 89 kg | | | | | | ● | | | |
| 96 kg | | | | | | | ● | | |
| 102 kg | | | | | | | | ● | |
| 109 kg | | | | | | | | ● | |
| +109 kg | | | | | | | | | ● |

Women's events
| Date → Event ↓ | 15 | 16 | 17 | 18 | 19 | 20 | 21 | 22 | 23 |
|---|---|---|---|---|---|---|---|---|---|
| 45 kg | ● | | | | | | | | |
| 49 kg | ● | | | | | | | | |
| 55 kg | | ● | | | | | | | |
| 59 kg | | | ● | | | | | | |
| 64 kg | | | | ● | | | | | |
| 71 kg | | | | | ● | | | | |
| 76 kg | | | | | | ● | | | |
| 81 kg | | | | | | | ● | | |
| 87 kg | | | | | | | | ● | |
| +87 kg | | | | | | | | | ● |

== Medal overview ==
=== Men ===
| Event | | Gold | | Silver | | Bronze | |
| – 55 kg | Snatch | Ramini Shamilishvili (GEO) | 113 kg | Muammer Şahin (TUR) | 112 kg | Valentin Iancu (ROU) | 109 kg |
| – 55 kg | Clean & Jerk | Angel Rusev (BUL) | 141 kg | Valentin Iancu (ROU) | 136 kg | Ramini Shamilishvili (GEO) | 136 kg |
| – 55 kg | Total | Angel Rusev (BUL) | 250 kg | Ramini Shamilishvili (GEO) | 249 kg | Valentin Iancu (ROU) | 245 kg |
| – 61 kg | Snatch | Shota Mishvelidze (GEO) | 136 kg | Sergio Massidda (ITA) | 130 kg | Ivan Dimov (BUL) | 127 kg |
| – 61 kg | Clean & Jerk | Sergio Massidda (ITA) | 162 kg | Shota Mishvelidze (GEO) | 162 kg | Gabriel Marinov (BUL) | 154 kg |
| – 61 kg | Total | Shota Mishvelidze (GEO) | 298 kg | Sergio Massidda (ITA) | 292 kg | Ivan Dimov (BUL) | 277 kg |
| – 67 kg | Snatch | Gor Sahakyan (ARM) | 145 kg | Kaan Kahriman (TUR) | 141 kg | Acorán Hernández (ESP) | 140 kg |
| – 67 kg | Clean & Jerk | Gor Sahakyan (ARM) | 175 kg | Ferdi Hardal (TUR) | 166 kg | Valentin Genchev (BUL) | 166 kg |
| – 67 kg | Total | Gor Sahakyan (ARM) | 320 kg | Acorán Hernández (ESP) | 305 kg | Kaan Kahriman (TUR) | 301 kg |
| – 73 kg | Snatch | Mirko Zanni (ITA) | 155 kg | Ritvars Suharevs (LAT) | 152 kg | Bozhidar Andreev (BUL) | 151 kg |
| – 73 kg | Clean & Jerk | Yusuf Fehmi Genç (TUR) | 186 kg | David Sánchez (ESP) | 185 kg | Max Lang (GER) | 185 kg |
| – 73 kg | Total | Ritvars Suharevs (LAT) | 336 kg | David Sánchez (ESP) | 335 kg | Mirko Zanni (ITA) | 335 kg |
| – 81 kg | Snatch | Oscar Reyes (ITA) | 155 kg | Batu Han Yüksel (TUR) | 152 kg | Hmayak Misakyan (AUT) | 151 kg |
| – 81 kg | Clean & Jerk | Oscar Reyes (ITA) | 188 kg | Rafik Harutyunyan (ARM) | 187 kg | Batu Han Yüksel (TUR) | 187 kg |
| – 81 kg | Total | Oscar Reyes (ITA) | 343 kg | Batu Han Yüksel (TUR) | 339 kg | Rafik Harutyunyan (ARM) | 337 kg |
| – 89 kg | Snatch | Andranik Karapetyan (ARM) | 178 kg | Karlos Nasar (BUL) | 174 kg | Marin Robu (MDA) | 166 kg |
| – 89 kg | Clean & Jerk | Karlos Nasar (BUL) | 221 kg WR | Nico Müller (GER) | 199 kg | Armands Mežinskis (LAT) | 198 kg |
| – 89 kg | Total | Karlos Nasar (BUL) | 395 kg WR | Andranik Karapetyan (ARM) | 374 kg | Marin Robu (MDA) | 364 kg |
| – 96 kg | Snatch | Davit Hovhannisyan (ARM) | 172 kg | Hakan Şükrü Kurnaz (TUR) | 170 kg | Ara Aghanyan (ARM) | 165 kg |
| – 96 kg | Clean & Jerk | Davit Hovhannisyan (ARM) | 205 kg | Ara Aghanyan (ARM) | 199 kg | Cristiano Giuseppe Ficco (ITA) | 198 kg |
| – 96 kg | Total | Davit Hovhannisyan (ARM) | 377 kg | Ara Aghanyan (ARM) | 364 kg | Cristiano Giuseppe Ficco (ITA) | 363 kg |
| – 102 kg | Snatch | Garik Karapetyan (ARM) | 178 kg | Irakli Chkheidze (GEO) | 173 kg | Matthäus Hofmann (GER) | 172 kg |
| – 102 kg | Clean & Jerk | Irakli Chkheidze (GEO) | 214 kg | Garik Karapetyan (ARM) | 214 kg WJR | Artūrs Plēsnieks (LAT) | 206 kg |
| – 102 kg | Total | Garik Karapetyan (ARM) | 392 kg | Irakli Chkheidze (GEO) | 387 kg | Tudor Bratu (MDA) | 374 kg |
| – 109 kg | Snatch | Samvel Gasparyan (ARM) | 175 kg | Vasil Marinov (BUL) | 174 kg | Sargis Martirosjan (AUT) | 173 kg |
| – 109 kg | Clean & Jerk | Samvel Gasparyan (ARM) | 220 kg | Petros Petrosyan (ARM) | 214 kg | Zaza Lomtadze (GEO) | 213 kg |
| – 109 kg | Total | Samvel Gasparyan (ARM) | 395 kg | Giorgi Chkheidze (GEO) | 381 kg | Petros Petrosyan (ARM) | 379 kg |
| + 109 kg | Snatch | Lasha Talakhadze (GEO) | 222 kg | Varazdat Lalayan (ARM) | 212 kg | Simon Martirosyan (ARM) | 195 kg |
| + 109 kg | Clean & Jerk | Lasha Talakhadze (GEO) | 252 kg | Varazdat Lalayan (ARM) | 250 kg | Simon Martirosyan (ARM) | 245 kg |
| + 109 kg | Total | Lasha Talakhadze (GEO) | 474 kg | Varazdat Lalayan (ARM) | 462 kg | Simon Martirosyan (ARM) | 440 kg |

=== Women ===
| Event | | Gold | | Silver | | Bronze | |
| – 45 kg | Snatch | Cansu Bektaş (TUR) | 72 kg | Adriana Pană (ROU) | 70 kg | Marta García (ESP) | 68 kg |
| – 45 kg | Clean & Jerk | Cansu Bektaş (TUR) | 90 kg | Gamze Altun (TUR) | 89 kg | Marta García (ESP) | 85 kg |
| – 45 kg | Total | Cansu Bektaş (TUR) | 162 kg | Adriana Pană (ROU) | 153 kg | Marta García (ESP) | 153 kg |
| – 49 kg | Snatch | Mihaela Cambei (ROU) | 92 kg ER | Giulia Imperio (ITA) | 83 kg | Anhelina Lomachynska (UKR) | 81 kg |
| – 49 kg | Clean & Jerk | Mihaela Cambei (ROU) | 106 kg | Giulia Imperio (ITA) | 100 kg | Tham Nguyen (IRL) | 98 kg |
| – 49 kg | Total | Mihaela Cambei (ROU) | 198 kg ER | Giulia Imperio (ITA) | 183 kg | Anhelina Lomachynska (UKR) | 176 kg |
| – 55 kg | Snatch | Andreea Cotruţa (ROU) | 91 kg | Svitlana Samuliak (UKR) | 90 kg | Izabella Yaylyan (ARM) | 87 kg |
| – 55 kg | Clean & Jerk | Andreea Cotruţa (ROU) | 110 kg | Svitlana Samuliak (UKR) | 109 kg | Izabella Yaylyan (ARM) | 109 kg |
| – 55 kg | Total | Andreea Cotruţa (ROU) | 201 kg | Svitlana Samuliak (UKR) | 199 kg | Izabella Yaylyan (ARM) | 196 kg |
| – 59 kg | Snatch | Kamila Konotop (UKR) | 106 kg ER | Nina Sterckx (BEL) | 93 kg | Nadiia Shpilka (UKR) | 93 kg |
| – 59 kg | Clean & Jerk | Kamila Konotop (UKR) | 129 kg ER | Nina Sterckx (BEL) | 116 kg | Nadiia Shpilka (UKR) | 114 kg |
| – 59 kg | Total | Kamila Konotop (UKR) | 235 kg ER | Nina Sterckx (BEL) | 209 kg | Nadiia Shpilka (UKR) | 207 kg |
| – 64 kg | Snatch | Nuray Güngör (TUR) | 99 kg | Aysel Özkan (TUR) | 98 kg | Mariia Hanhur (UKR) | 98 kg |
| – 64 kg | Clean & Jerk | Zoe Smith (GBR) | 121 kg | Ine Andersson (NOR) | 121 kg | Nuray Güngör (TUR) | 120 kg |
| – 64 kg | Total | Nuray Güngör (TUR) | 219 kg | Mariia Hanhur (UKR) | 214 kg | Zoe Smith (GBR) | 214 kg |
| – 71 kg | Snatch | Loredana Toma (ROU) | 110 kg | Giulia Miserendino (ITA) | 105 kg | Lisa Schweizer (GER) | 103 kg |
| – 71 kg | Clean & Jerk | Loredana Toma (ROU) | 130 kg | Sarah Davies (GBR) | 126 kg | Giulia Miserendino (ITA) | 125 kg |
| – 71 kg | Total | Loredana Toma (ROU) | 240 kg | Giulia Miserendino (ITA) | 230 kg | Sarah Davies (GBR) | 226 kg |
| – 76 kg | Snatch | Marie Fegue (FRA) | 113 kg | Tatev Hakobyan (ARM) | 104 kg | Nicole Rubanovich (ISR) | 100 kg |
| – 76 kg | Clean & Jerk | Marie Fegue (FRA) | 140 kg | Daniela Ivanova (LAT) | 126 kg | Tatev Hakobyan (ARM) | 122 kg |
| – 76 kg | Total | Marie Fegue (FRA) | 253 kg | Tatev Hakobyan (ARM) | 226 kg | Daniela Ivanova (LAT) | 222 kg |
| – 81 kg | Snatch | Iryna Dekha (UKR) | 123 kg | Elena Erighina (MDA) | 104 kg | Dilara Narin (TUR) | 101 kg |
| – 81 kg | Clean & Jerk | Iryna Dekha (UKR) | 135 kg | Dilara Narin (TUR) | 134 kg | Sara Yenigün (TUR) | 131 kg |
| – 81 kg | Total | Iryna Dekha (UKR) | 258 kg | Dilara Narin (TUR) | 235 kg | Elena Erighina (MDA) | 234 kg |
| – 87 kg | Snatch | Solfrid Koanda (NOR) | 117 kg | Anastasiia Manievska (UKR) | 108 kg | Hripsime Khurshudyan (ARM) | 107 kg |
| – 87 kg | Clean & Jerk | Solfrid Koanda (NOR) | 155 kg | Anastasiia Manievska (UKR) | 130 kg | Hripsime Khurshudyan (ARM) | 120 kg |
| – 87 kg | Total | Solfrid Koanda (NOR) | 272 kg | Anastasiia Manievska (UKR) | 238 kg | Hripsime Khurshudyan (ARM) | 227 kg |
| + 87 kg | Snatch | Anastasiia Hotfrid (GEO) | 117 kg | Valentyna Kisil (UKR) | 111 kg | Melike Günal (TUR) | 110 kg |
| + 87 kg | Clean & Jerk | Emily Campbell (GBR) | 143 kg | Anastasiia Hotfrid (GEO) | 135 kg | Sarah Fischer (AUT) | 134 kg |
| + 87 kg | Total | Emily Campbell (GBR) | 253 kg | Anastasiia Hotfrid (GEO) | 252 kg | Valentyna Kisil (UKR) | 244 kg |

== Team ranking ==
=== Men ===
| Rank | Team | Points |
|---|---|---|
| 1 | Armenia | 762 |
| 2 | Georgia | 695 |
| 3 | Turkey | 587 |
| 4 | Bulgaria | 517 |
| 5 | Germany | 360 |
| 6 | Poland | 355 |
| 7 | Czech Republic | 319 |
| 8 | Italy | 299 |
| 9 | Moldova | 288 |
| 10 | Great Britain | 275 |

=== Women ===
| Rank | Team | Points |
|---|---|---|
| 1 | Turkey | 650 |
| 2 | Ukraine | 647 |
| 3 | Armenia | 554 |
| 4 | Great Britain | 446 |
| 5 | Romania | 388 |
| 6 | Spain | 338 |
| 7 | Moldova | 301 |
| 8 | Norway | 297 |
| 9 | Finland | 273 |
| 10 | Germany | 265 |

== Participating nations ==
A total of 310 competitors from 39 nations participated:

1. Albania (5)
2. Armenia (20) (Host)
3. Austria (7)
4. ~~Azerbaijan (4)~~
5. Belgium (4)
6. Bosnia and Herzegovina (2)
7. Bulgaria (14)
8. Croatia (5)
9. Cyprus (1)
10. Czech Republic (15)
11. Denmark (9)
12. Estonia (3)
13. Finland (10)
14. France (7)
15. Georgia (13)
16. Germany (12)
17. Great Britain (15)
18. Greece (7)
19. Hungary (7)
20. Iceland (2)
21. Ireland (5)
22. Israel (7)
23. Italy (8)
24. Latvia (5)
25. Lithuania (8)
26. Luxembourg (1)
27. Malta (1)
28. Moldova (11)
29. Netherlands (4)
30. Norway (7)
31. Poland (14)
32. Portugal (7)
33. Romania (9)
34. Serbia (3)
35. Slovakia (8)
36. Spain (14)
37. Sweden (5)
38. Switzerland (2)
39. Turkey (19)
40. Ukraine (14)

== Men's results ==
=== Men's 55 kg ===
| Rank | Athlete | Group | Body weight | Snatch (kg) | | | | Clean & Jerk (kg) | | | | Total |
| Rank | Athlete | Group | Body weight | 1 | 2 | 3 | Rank | 1 | 2 | 3 | Rank | Total |
|---|---|---|---|---|---|---|---|---|---|---|---|---|
| 1st place, gold medalist(s) | Angel Rusev (BUL) | A | 54.88 | 105 | ~~108~~ | 109 | 4 | 135 | 141 | — | 1st place, gold medalist(s) | 250 |
| 2nd place, silver medalist(s) | Ramini Shamilishvili (GEO) | A | 54.94 | 109 | 111 | 113 | 1st place, gold medalist(s) | 132 | ~~136~~ | 136 | 3rd place, bronze medalist(s) | 249 |
| 3rd place, bronze medalist(s) | Valentin Iancu (ROU) | A | 54.80 | ~~105~~ | 105 | 109 | 3rd place, bronze medalist(s) | 131 | 136 | ~~141~~ | 2nd place, silver medalist(s) | 245 |
| 4 | Muammer Şahin (TUR) | A | 54.96 | 108 | 110 | 112 | 2nd place, silver medalist(s) | 125 | 130 | ~~133~~ | 5 | 242 |
| 5 | Dmytro Voronovskyi (UKR) | A | 54.84 | 103 | ~~106~~ | 106 | 5 | 128 | 132 | ~~137~~ | 4 | 238 |
| 6 | Deniz Danev (BUL) | A | 54.72 | 96 | ~~100~~ | ~~100~~ | 6 | 120 | 126 | ~~132~~ | 6 | 222 |
| 7 | Michael Otero (ESP) | A | 54.94 | ~~96~~ | 96 | ~~100~~ | 7 | 125 | ~~131~~ | ~~133~~ | 7 | 221 |
| 8 | Iulian Betca (MDA) | A | 54.56 | ~~93~~ | 93 | ~~97~~ | 8 | 110 | 115 | ~~120~~ | 8 | 208 |
| — | Daniel Lungu (MDA) | A | 54.92 | ~~108~~ | ~~109~~ | ~~110~~ | — | — | — | — | — | — |

=== Men's 61 kg ===
| Rank | Athlete | Group | Body weight | Snatch (kg) | | | | Clean & Jerk (kg) | | | | Total |
| Rank | Athlete | Group | Body weight | 1 | 2 | 3 | Rank | 1 | 2 | 3 | Rank | Total |
|---|---|---|---|---|---|---|---|---|---|---|---|---|
| 1st place, gold medalist(s) | Shota Mishvelidze (GEO) | A | 60.80 | 129 | 133 | 136 | 1st place, gold medalist(s) | ~~154~~ | 155 | 162 | 2nd place, silver medalist(s) | 298 |
| 2nd place, silver medalist(s) | Sergio Massidda (ITA) | A | 60.88 | 130 | ~~134~~ | ~~137~~ | 2nd place, silver medalist(s) | ~~154~~ | 154 | 162 | 1st place, gold medalist(s) | 292 |
| 3rd place, bronze medalist(s) | Ivan Dimov (BUL) | A | 60.96 | 123 | 127 | ~~130~~ | 3rd place, bronze medalist(s) | 142 | 147 | 150 | 7 | 277 |
| 4 | Goderdzi Berdelidze (GEO) | A | 60.78 | ~~122~~ | 122 | ~~126~~ | 4 | 147 | 153 | ~~156~~ | 4 | 275 |
| 5 | Mustafa Eliş (TUR) | A | 60.50 | 115 | 118 | 120 | 6 | ~~146~~ | 146 | 152 | 5 | 272 |
| 6 | Cosmin Isofache (ROU) | A | 60.28 | 110 | 115 | 120 | 5 | 140 | 145 | 150 | 6 | 270 |
| 7 | Pavlo Zalipskyi (UKR) | A | 60.88 | ~~119~~ | 119 | ~~121~~ | 7 | 138 | 142 | ~~147~~ | 9 | 261 |
| 8 | Marian Luca (ROU) | A | 59.70 | 110 | 115 | ~~120~~ | 8 | 135 | 140 | 143 | 8 | 258 |
| 9 | František Polák (CZE) | A | 60.58 | 103 | 107 | ~~111~~ | 9 | ~~127~~ | 127 | — | 10 | 234 |
| — | Gabriel Marinov (BUL) | A | 60.80 | ~~118~~ | ~~118~~ | ~~118~~ | — | 148 | 154 | ~~156~~ | 3rd place, bronze medalist(s) | — |

=== Men's 67 kg ===
| Rank | Athlete | Group | Body weight | Snatch (kg) | | | | Clean & Jerk (kg) | | | | Total |
| Rank | Athlete | Group | Body weight | 1 | 2 | 3 | Rank | 1 | 2 | 3 | Rank | Total |
|---|---|---|---|---|---|---|---|---|---|---|---|---|
| 1st place, gold medalist(s) | Gor Sahakyan (ARM) | A | 66.84 | 140 | 145 | ~~147~~ | 1st place, gold medalist(s) | 170 | 175 | — | 1st place, gold medalist(s) | 320 |
| 2nd place, silver medalist(s) | Acorán Hernández (ESP) | A | 66.60 | 135 | 140 | ~~142~~ | 3rd place, bronze medalist(s) | 159 | 162 | 165 | 5 | 305 |
| 3rd place, bronze medalist(s) | Kaan Kahriman (TUR) | A | 66.46 | 136 | 141 | ~~146~~ | 2nd place, silver medalist(s) | 156 | 160 | ~~163~~ | 6 | 301 |
| 4 | Ferdi Hardal (TUR) | A | 66.80 | 135 | ~~138~~ | ~~138~~ | 4 | 166 | ~~171~~ | ~~171~~ | 2nd place, silver medalist(s) | 301 |
| 5 | Petr Petrov (CZE) | A | 66.66 | 128 | ~~132~~ | 133 | 5 | 159 | 165 | ~~167~~ | 4 | 298 |
| 6 | Valentin Genchev (BUL) | A | 66.82 | 125 | ~~128~~ | ~~128~~ | 8 | 160 | 166 | — | 3rd place, bronze medalist(s) | 291 |
| 7 | Simon Brandhuber (GER) | A | 66.02 | 128 | 132 | ~~136~~ | 6 | 147 | 152 | 155 | 8 | 287 |
| 8 | Marek Komorowski (POL) | A | 66.68 | ~~120~~ | 123 | ~~127~~ | 9 | ~~145~~ | 145 | 155 | 7 | 278 |
| 9 | Faris Durak (BIH) | A | 66.36 | 95 | ~~100~~ | ~~100~~ | 10 | 110 | ~~118~~ | ~~118~~ | 9 | 205 |
| — | Dian Pampordzhiev (BUL) | A | 66.80 | 123 | ~~126~~ | 126 | 7 | ~~160~~ | ~~160~~ | ~~162~~ | — | — |
| — | Jon Luke Mau (GER) | A | 61.42 | — | — | — | — | — | — | — | — | — |

=== Men's 73 kg ===
| Rank | Athlete | Group | Body weight | Snatch (kg) | | | | Clean & Jerk (kg) | | | | Total |
| Rank | Athlete | Group | Body weight | 1 | 2 | 3 | Rank | 1 | 2 | 3 | Rank | Total |
|---|---|---|---|---|---|---|---|---|---|---|---|---|
| 1st place, gold medalist(s) | Ritvars Suharevs (LAT) | A | 72.84 | 147 | 152 | ~~155~~ | 2nd place, silver medalist(s) | 177 | 182 | 184 | 4 | 336 |
| 2nd place, silver medalist(s) | David Sánchez (ESP) | B | 72.94 | 145 | 148 | 150 | 6 | 180 | 183 | 185 | 2nd place, silver medalist(s) | 335 |
| 3rd place, bronze medalist(s) | Mirko Zanni (ITA) | A | 72.46 | 150 | 153 | 155 | 1st place, gold medalist(s) | 175 | 180 | ~~182~~ | 8 | 335 |
| 4 | Bozhidar Andreev (BUL) | A | 73.00 | 147 | 151 | ~~154~~ | 3rd place, bronze medalist(s) | ~~180~~ | ~~180~~ | 181 | 7 | 332 |
| 5 | Yusuf Fehmi Genç (TUR) | A | 71.68 | 140 | 143 | 146 | 9 | 181 | 184 | 186 | 1st place, gold medalist(s) | 332 |
| 6 | Max Lang (GER) | A | 72.76 | 143 | ~~146~~ | ~~146~~ | 10 | 175 | 180 | 185 | 3rd place, bronze medalist(s) | 328 |
| 7 | Muhammed Furkan Özbek (TUR) | A | 72.48 | 140 | 143 | 146 | 8 | 181 | ~~186~~ | ~~187~~ | 6 | 327 |
| 8 | Kakhi Asanidze (GEO) | A | 72.72 | 145 | ~~151~~ | 151 | 4 | 175 | ~~181~~ | ~~182~~ | 9 | 326 |
| 9 | Piotr Kudłaszyk (POL) | B | 72.74 | 138 | 142 | ~~144~~ | 11 | 175 | ~~182~~ | 183 | 5 | 325 |
| 10 | Erkand Qerimaj (ALB) | B | 72.48 | 145 | 150 | ~~152~~ | 5 | 168 | ~~173~~ | ~~174~~ | 11 | 318 |
| 11 | Roberto Gutu (GER) | B | 72.80 | 143 | 146 | ~~149~~ | 7 | ~~170~~ | ~~170~~ | 170 | 10 | 316 |
| 12 | Jonathan Chin (GBR) | B | 72.20 | 125 | 129 | ~~132~~ | 12 | ~~164~~ | 164 | 168 | 12 | 297 |
| — | Briken Calja (ALB) | A | 72.88 | ~~151~~ | ~~152~~ | ~~152~~ | — | — | — | — | — | — |

=== Men's 81 kg ===
| Rank | Athlete | Group | Body weight | Snatch (kg) | | | | Clean & Jerk (kg) | | | | Total |
| Rank | Athlete | Group | Body weight | 1 | 2 | 3 | Rank | 1 | 2 | 3 | Rank | Total |
|---|---|---|---|---|---|---|---|---|---|---|---|---|
| 1st place, gold medalist(s) | Oscar Reyes (ITA) | A | 79.56 | 152 | 155 | ~~160~~ | 1st place, gold medalist(s) | 188 | — | — | 1st place, gold medalist(s) | 343 |
| DSQ | Batu Han Yüksel (TUR) | A | 80.96 | 148 | 152 | ~~156~~ | DSQ | 180 | 184 | 187 | DSQ | 339 |
| 3rd place, bronze medalist(s) | Rafik Harutyunyan (ARM) | A | 80.64 | ~~150~~ | 150 | ~~156~~ | 4 | 183 | 187 | ~~190~~ | 2nd place, silver medalist(s) | 337 |
| 4 | Hmayak Misakyan (AUT) | A | 80.56 | 143 | 147 | 151 | 3rd place, bronze medalist(s) | ~~173~~ | 175 | ~~179~~ | 9 | 326 |
| 5 | Antonis Martasidis (CYP) | A | 80.40 | ~~140~~ | 140 | 146 | 6 | ~~180~~ | 180 | ~~186~~ | 4 | 326 |
| 6 | Chris Murray (GBR) | A | 80.26 | 142 | 147 | ~~151~~ | 5 | 178 | ~~181~~ | ~~183~~ | 5 | 325 |
| 7 | Javier González (ESP) | A | 80.50 | 138 | 142 | ~~146~~ | 10 | 171 | 176 | ~~180~~ | 7 | 318 |
| 8 | Kristi Ramadani (ALB) | B | 80.60 | ~~138~~ | 138 | 142 | 9 | 168 | 173 | 175 | 8 | 317 |
| 9 | Dmytro Kondratiuk (UKR) | A | 80.96 | 135 | 140 | ~~143~~ | 11 | ~~177~~ | 177 | ~~185~~ | 6 | 317 |
| 10 | Sebastián Cabala (SVK) | B | 75.72 | 135 | 139 | 143 | 7 | 165 | ~~171~~ | 173 | 11 | 316 |
| 11 | Petr Mareček (CZE) | A | 80.16 | 143 | ~~147~~ | ~~149~~ | 8 | 173 | ~~176~~ | ~~176~~ | 12 | 316 |
| 12 | Szilárd Fekécs (HUN) | B | 80.34 | ~~136~~ | ~~136~~ | 136 | 12 | 165 | 168 | 173 | 10 | 309 |
| 13 | Dominik Certov (AUT) | B | 80.14 | ~~135~~ | 135 | ~~140~~ | 13 | 161 | 166 | ~~170~~ | 13 | 301 |
| 14 | Žilvinas Žilinskas (LTU) | B | 79.08 | 125 | ~~130~~ | 130 | 14 | 160 | 165 | ~~170~~ | 14 | 295 |
| 15 | Goran Ćetković (CRO) | B | 80.02 | 125 | ~~130~~ | ~~131~~ | 15 | ~~155~~ | ~~155~~ | 155 | 15 | 280 |
| — | Daniel Godelli (ALB) | A | 80.76 | ~~150~~ | ~~151~~ | ~~152~~ | — | — | — | — | — | — |

=== Men's 89 kg ===
| Rank | Athlete | Group | Body weight | Snatch (kg) | | | | Clean & Jerk (kg) | | | | Total |
| Rank | Athlete | Group | Body weight | 1 | 2 | 3 | Rank | 1 | 2 | 3 | Rank | Total |
|---|---|---|---|---|---|---|---|---|---|---|---|---|
| 1st place, gold medalist(s) | Karlos Nasar (BUL) | A | 88.04 | 165 | 170 | 174 | 2nd place, silver medalist(s) | 205 | 221 WR | — | 1st place, gold medalist(s) | 395 WR |
| 2nd place, silver medalist(s) | Andranik Karapetyan (ARM) | A | 88.66 | 167 | 173 | 178 ER | 1st place, gold medalist(s) | 190 | 196 | ~~206~~ | 5 | 374 |
| 3rd place, bronze medalist(s) | Marin Robu (MDA) | A | 87.28 | 161 | ~~166~~ | 166 | 3rd place, bronze medalist(s) | 193 | 198 | ~~201~~ | 4 | 364 |
| 4 | Nico Müller (GER) | A | 88.56 | 159 | ~~163~~ | ~~163~~ | 6 | 194 | ~~199~~ | 199 | 2nd place, silver medalist(s) | 358 |
| 5 | Raphael Friedrich (GER) | A | 88.48 | 156 | 162 | 165 | 4 | ~~190~~ | ~~190~~ | 190 | 6 | 355 |
| 6 | Armands Mežinskis (LAT) | A | 88.90 | 154 | ~~160~~ | ~~161~~ | 8 | 192 | 198 | ~~201~~ | 3rd place, bronze medalist(s) | 352 |
| 7 | Artūrs Vasiļonoks (LAT) | A | 88.90 | 155 | 160 | 163 | 5 | ~~188~~ | 188 | ~~195~~ | 8 | 351 |
| 8 | Theodoros Iakovidis (GRE) | A | 88.92 | 150 | 155 | 158 | 7 | ~~180~~ | 180 | ~~185~~ | 9 | 338 |
| 9 | Karol Samko (SVK) | B | 88.78 | 130 | 135 | ~~138~~ | 12 | 181 | ~~188~~ | 188 | 7 | 323 |
| 10 | Leho Pent (EST) | B | 88.22 | 140 | ~~145~~ | 145 | 10 | 170 | 177 | ~~185~~ | 10 | 322 |
| 11 | Seán Brown (IRL) | B | 86.90 | ~~141~~ | 141 | 144 | 11 | ~~171~~ | 171 | ~~175~~ | 11 | 315 |
| — | Maksym Dombrovskyi (UKR) | A | 88.52 | 145 | 150 | — | 9 | — | — | — | — | — |
| — | Antti Peltokangas (FIN) | B | 88.42 | ~~127~~ | ~~127~~ | ~~127~~ | — | 167 | ~~177~~ | ~~177~~ | 12 | — |
| — | Antonino Pizzolato (ITA) | A | 88.74 | — | — | — | — | — | — | — | — | — |
| — | Krenar Shoraj (ALB) | A | 88.30 | — | — | — | — | — | — | — | — | — |
| — | Stefano Cataldi (GBR) | B | 87.44 | — | — | — | — | — | — | — | — | — |

=== Men's 96 kg ===
| Rank | Athlete | Group | Body weight | Snatch (kg) | | | | Clean & Jerk (kg) | | | | Total |
| Rank | Athlete | Group | Body weight | 1 | 2 | 3 | Rank | 1 | 2 | 3 | Rank | Total |
|---|---|---|---|---|---|---|---|---|---|---|---|---|
| 1st place, gold medalist(s) | Davit Hovhannisyan (ARM) | A | 95.56 | 165 | 170 | 172 | 1st place, gold medalist(s) | 200 | 205 | — | 1st place, gold medalist(s) | 377 |
| 2nd place, silver medalist(s) | Ara Aghanyan (ARM) | A | 95.40 | 165 | ~~170~~ | ~~171~~ | 3rd place, bronze medalist(s) | 199 | — | — | 2nd place, silver medalist(s) | 364 |
| 3rd place, bronze medalist(s) | Cristiano Giuseppe Ficco (ITA) | A | 89.30 | 165 | ~~170~~ | ~~170~~ | 4 | ~~197~~ | ~~197~~ | 198 | 3rd place, bronze medalist(s) | 363 |
| DSQ | ~~Hakan Şükrü Kurnaz (TUR)~~ | A | 95.32 | 164 | 167 | 170 | 2nd place, silver medalist(s) | 180 | 187 | 191 | 6 | 361 |
| 5 | Cyrille Tchatchet (GBR) | A | 95.44 | 151 | 156 | ~~160~~ | 6 | 189 | 194 | ~~198~~ | 4 | 350 |
| 6 | Anatolii Horidko (UKR) | A | 95.88 | ~~155~~ | 155 | ~~160~~ | 8 | ~~186~~ | 187 | 193 | 5 | 348 |
| 7 | Irakli Gobejishvili (GEO) | A | 95.64 | 160 | ~~166~~ | ~~166~~ | 5 | ~~187~~ | 187 | ~~198~~ | 7 | 347 |
| 8 | Tudor Ciobanu (MDA) | B | 95.52 | ~~150~~ | 155 | 155 | 7 | 185 | ~~190~~ | ~~190~~ | 8 | 340 |
| 9 | Bartłomiej Adamus (POL) | B | 95.40 | 145 | 149 | ~~152~~ | 9 | 182 | 185 | — | 9 | 334 |
| 10 | Stanislav Maznitsyn (ISR) | B | 94.30 | 145 | 149 | ~~152~~ | 10 | 175 | 181 | — | 10 | 330 |
| 11 | Tomas Licinchai (LTU) | B | 95.06 | ~~136~~ | 136 | 141 | 13 | 170 | 175 | 180 | 11 | 321 |
| 12 | Simon Kastbjerg Darville (DEN) | B | 95.42 | 135 | 140 | 143 | 12 | 163 | 170 | ~~176~~ | 13 | 313 |
| 13 | Lukas Kordušas (LTU) | B | 95.12 | 135 | 140 | ~~144~~ | 14 | 166 | 172 | ~~174~~ | 12 | 312 |
| 14 | Roni Peltonen (FIN) | B | 95.40 | 130 | ~~135~~ | 135 | 15 | 165 | ~~172~~ | ~~173~~ | 15 | 300 |
| — | João Melo (POR) | B | 93.64 | ~~120~~ | ~~120~~ | ~~120~~ | — | 150 | 155 | ~~160~~ | 16 | — |
| — | Yannick Tschan (SUI) | B | 94.98 | 143 | 147 | ~~150~~ | 11 | ~~183~~ | ~~183~~ | ~~184~~ | — | — |
| — | Redon Manushi (FRA) | A | 95.38 | ~~161~~ | ~~161~~ | ~~161~~ | — | — | — | — | — | — |
| — | Romain Imadouchène (FRA) | A | 95.52 | ~~160~~ | ~~160~~ | ~~160~~ | — | — | — | — | — | — |

=== Men's 102 kg ===
| Rank | Athlete | Group | Body weight | Snatch (kg) | | | | Clean & Jerk (kg) | | | | Total |
| Rank | Athlete | Group | Body weight | 1 | 2 | 3 | Rank | 1 | 2 | 3 | Rank | Total |
|---|---|---|---|---|---|---|---|---|---|---|---|---|
| 1st place, gold medalist(s) | Garik Karapetyan (ARM) | A | 101.60 | 172 | ~~178~~ | 178 | 1st place, gold medalist(s) | 208 | 214 | — | 2nd place, silver medalist(s) | 392 |
| 2nd place, silver medalist(s) | Irakli Chkheidze (GEO) | A | 101.46 | 168 | 173 | ~~178~~ | 2nd place, silver medalist(s) | 207 | 214 | ~~220~~ | 1st place, gold medalist(s) | 387 |
| 3rd place, bronze medalist(s) | Tudor Bratu (MDA) | A | 99.34 | ~~170~~ | 170 | ~~172~~ | 4 | ~~200~~ | 200 | 204 | 5 | 374 |
| 4 | Artūrs Plēsnieks (LAT) | A | 101.70 | 163 | 168 | ~~172~~ | 5 | 200 | 206 | — | 3rd place, bronze medalist(s) | 374 |
| 5 | Matthäus Hofmann (GER) | A | 101.86 | 165 | 169 | 172 | 3rd place, bronze medalist(s) | 195 | 201 | ~~205~~ | 6 | 373 |
| 6 | Daniel Goljasz (POL) | A | 99.08 | ~~156~~ | 156 | ~~161~~ | 6 | 196 | 202 | 205 | 4 | 361 |
| 7 | Irmantas Kačinskas (LTU) | B | 98.44 | 146 | 150 | 154 | 8 | 176 | 180 | 185 | 8 | 339 |
| 8 | Jacob Diakovasilis (DEN) | B | 101.84 | 140 | 144 | 147 | 9 | 174 | 180 | 186 | 7 | 333 |
| 9 | Joen Vikingsson Sjöblom (SWE) | B | 100.62 | 145 | 150 | 154 | 7 | 175 | — | — | 10 | 329 |
| 10 | Artur Mugurdumov (ISR) | B | 99.88 | ~~145~~ | 145 | ~~149~~ | 10 | 174 | ~~180~~ | ~~181~~ | 12 | 319 |
| 11 | Arnošt Vogel (CZE) | B | 101.50 | 143 | ~~146~~ | ~~146~~ | 11 | ~~175~~ | 175 | ~~185~~ | 11 | 318 |
| — | Stefan Ågren (SWE) | A | 101.88 | ~~150~~ | ~~150~~ | ~~150~~ | — | 180 | ~~187~~ | ~~194~~ | 9 | — |
| — | Marcos Ruiz (ESP) | A | 100.80 | — | — | — | — | — | — | — | — | — |
| — | Arsen Kasabijew (POL) | A | 101.70 | — | — | — | — | — | — | — | — | — |

=== Men's 109 kg ===
| Rank | Athlete | Group | Body weight | Snatch (kg) | | | | Clean & Jerk (kg) | | | | Total |
| Rank | Athlete | Group | Body weight | 1 | 2 | 3 | Rank | 1 | 2 | 3 | Rank | Total |
|---|---|---|---|---|---|---|---|---|---|---|---|---|
| 1st place, gold medalist(s) | Samvel Gasparyan (ARM) | A | 104.42 | 172 | ~~175~~ | 175 | 1st place, gold medalist(s) | 211 | 220 | — | 1st place, gold medalist(s) | 395 |
| 2nd place, silver medalist(s) | Giorgi Chkheidze (GEO) | A | 108.74 | 166 | 170 | 173 | 4 | 203 | 208 | — | 4 | 381 |
| 3rd place, bronze medalist(s) | Petros Petrosyan (ARM) | A | 105.58 | 160 | ~~165~~ | 165 | 6 | 210 | 214 | ~~217~~ | 2nd place, silver medalist(s) | 379 |
| 4 | Zaza Lomtadze (GEO) | A | 108.12 | 158 | 163 | ~~165~~ | 8 | ~~202~~ | 203 | 213 | 3rd place, bronze medalist(s) | 376 |
| 5 | Vasil Marinov (BUL) | A | 106.42 | 168 | 172 | 174 | 2nd place, silver medalist(s) | ~~200~~ | 200 | ~~205~~ | 6 | 374 |
| 6 | Onur Demirci (TUR) | A | 108.68 | 160 | ~~166~~ | ~~169~~ | 10 | 192 | 200 | 204 | 5 | 364 |
| 7 | Sargis Martirosjan (AUT) | A | 108.46 | 168 | 173 | ~~175~~ | 3rd place, bronze medalist(s) | 177 | ~~187~~ | 190 | 8 | 363 |
| 8 | Marcin Izdebski (POL) | A | 108.24 | 160 | ~~165~~ | 165 | 7 | 186 | ~~191~~ | ~~192~~ | 9 | 351 |
| 9 | Josef Kolář (CZE) | A | 104.64 | 152 | 157 | ~~160~~ | 11 | 186 | 191 | ~~195~~ | 7 | 348 |
| 10 | Artiom Gritenco (MDA) | B | 108.54 | 145 | 150 | 153 | 13 | 172 | 181 | ~~186~~ | 10 | 334 |
| 11 | Arnas Šidiškis (LTU) | B | 108.74 | 140 | 145 | ~~150~~ | 14 | 170 | 175 | ~~181~~ | 12 | 320 |
| 12 | Jan Kolář (CZE) | B | 102.20 | 136 | 141 | ~~146~~ | 15 | 170 | 175 | ~~180~~ | 11 | 316 |
| — | Andrew Griffiths (GBR) | B | 108.90 | 152 | 156 | ~~160~~ | 12 | ~~181~~ | ~~182~~ | ~~182~~ | — | — |
| — | Jarosław Samoraj (POL) | A | 107.20 | 167 | 171 | ~~174~~ | 5 | — | — | — | — | — |
| — | Mak Numić (BIH) | B | 108.34 | ~~120~~ | ~~126~~ | ~~126~~ | — | 151 | — | — | 13 | — |
| — | Julian Heidenbauer (AUT) | B | 108.52 | ~~150~~ | ~~150~~ | ~~150~~ | — | — | — | — | — | — |
| — | Radoslav Tatarčík (SVK) | A | 108.60 | ~~161~~ | ~~163~~ | 163 | 9 | ~~179~~ | ~~179~~ | — | — | — |
| — | Hannes Keskitalo (FIN) | B | 102.12 | — | — | — | — | — | — | — | — | — |

=== Men's +109 kg ===
| Rank | Athlete | Group | Body weight | Snatch (kg) | | | | Clean & Jerk (kg) | | | | Total |
| Rank | Athlete | Group | Body weight | 1 | 2 | 3 | Rank | 1 | 2 | 3 | Rank | Total |
|---|---|---|---|---|---|---|---|---|---|---|---|---|
| 1st place, gold medalist(s) | Lasha Talakhadze (GEO) | A | 175.78 | 210 | 217 | 222 | 1st place, gold medalist(s) | 246 | 252 | — | 1st place, gold medalist(s) | 474 |
| 2nd place, silver medalist(s) | Varazdat Lalayan (ARM) | A | 153.82 | 205 | 212 | ~~218~~ | 2nd place, silver medalist(s) | 240 | ~~250~~ | 250 | 2nd place, silver medalist(s) | 462 |
| 3rd place, bronze medalist(s) | Simon Martirosyan (ARM) | A | 128.32 | 190 | 195 | ~~200~~ | 3rd place, bronze medalist(s) | 235 | 245 | — | 3rd place, bronze medalist(s) | 440 |
| 4 | Mart Seim (EST) | A | 144.44 | ~~170~~ | 170 | 175 | 5 | ~~220~~ | 220 | — | 5 | 395 |
| 5 | Bakari Turmanidze (GEO) | A | 162.32 | ~~170~~ | 170 | 176 | 4 | 210 | 216 | ~~221~~ | 7 | 392 |
| 6 | Arkadiusz Michalski (POL) | A | 114.80 | 170 | ~~175~~ | ~~175~~ | 6 | 210 | 217 | ~~223~~ | 6 | 387 |
| 7 | Péter Nagy (HUN) | A | 159.58 | 163 | 168 | ~~172~~ | 8 | 208 | 213 | ~~220~~ | 8 | 381 |
| 8 | Anthony Coullet (FRA) | B | 149.46 | ~~160~~ | 160 | ~~165~~ | 10 | 202 | 206 | ~~215~~ | 9 | 366 |
| 9 | Ragnar Holme (NOR) | B | 132.26 | 160 | 165 | ~~170~~ | 9 | 200 | ~~206~~ | ~~206~~ | 10 | 365 |
| 10 | Gordon Shaw (GBR) | B | 130.90 | 164 | 168 | ~~171~~ | 7 | ~~192~~ | 193 | ~~198~~ | 12 | 361 |
| 11 | Mackenzie Middleton (GBR) | B | 142.90 | ~~155~~ | 155 | ~~161~~ | 11 | ~~190~~ | 193 | ~~202~~ | 11 | 348 |
| 12 | Križan Rajić (CRO) | B | 129.84 | 140 | ~~145~~ | 145 | 12 | 170 | 175 | ~~180~~ | 13 | 320 |
| — | Kamil Kučera (CZE) | A | 161.78 | ~~175~~ | ~~175~~ | ~~175~~ | — | 225 | ~~236~~ | — | 4 | — |
| — | David Litvinov (ISR) | A | 132.56 | ~~180~~ | ~~180~~ | ~~180~~ | — | ~~210~~ | ~~210~~ | ~~210~~ | — | — |
| — | Tamaš Kajdoči (SRB) | A | 138.96 | — | — | — | — | — | — | — | — | — |
| — | Enzo Kuworge (NED) | A | 154.82 | — | — | — | — | — | — | — | — | — |

== Women's results ==
=== Women's 45 kg ===
| Rank | Athlete | Group | Body weight | Snatch (kg) | | | | Clean & Jerk (kg) | | | | Total |
| Rank | Athlete | Group | Body weight | 1 | 2 | 3 | Rank | 1 | 2 | 3 | Rank | Total |
|---|---|---|---|---|---|---|---|---|---|---|---|---|
| 1st place, gold medalist(s) | Cansu Bektaş (TUR) | A | 44.58 | 70 | ~~72~~ | 72 | 1st place, gold medalist(s) | 86 | 88 | 90 | 1st place, gold medalist(s) | 162 |
| 2nd place, silver medalist(s) | Adriana Pană (ROM) | A | 44.60 | 65 | 68 | 70 | 2nd place, silver medalist(s) | 80 | 83 | ~~87~~ | 4 | 153 |
| 3rd place, bronze medalist(s) | Marta García (ESP) | A | 44.74 | 68 | ~~70~~ | ~~71~~ | 3rd place, bronze medalist(s) | 80 | 83 | 85 | 3rd place, bronze medalist(s) | 153 |
| 4 | Gamze Altun (TUR) | A | 44.42 | 63 | ~~65~~ | ~~65~~ | 5 | 84 | 86 | 89 | 2nd place, silver medalist(s) | 152 |
| 5 | Bianca Dumitrescu (ROM) | A | 44.58 | 60 | 63 | 67 | 4 | 75 | 78 | 81 | 5 | 148 |
| 6 | Teodora Hîncu (MDA) | A | 44.56 | ~~62~~ | ~~63~~ | 63 | 6 | 74 | 77 | 79 | 6 | 142 |
| 7 | Ecaterina Grabucea (MDA) | A | 43.78 | ~~57~~ | 57 | 59 | 8 | 73 | ~~76~~ | 76 | 7 | 135 |
| 8 | Boyana Kostadinova (BUL) | A | 44.96 | ~~58~~ | 59 | 61 | 7 | 70 | 73 | ~~75~~ | 8 | 134 |
| 9 | Reni Ruseva (BUL) | A | 44.90 | 55 | ~~57~~ | ~~58~~ | 9 | 70 | ~~73~~ | ~~74~~ | 9 | 125 |
| 10 | Nair Rosas Pinto (POR) | B | 43.98 | 40 | 42 | 44 | 10 | 52 | 55 | 58 | 10 | 102 |
| — | Joana Anrique Cabrera (ESP) | A | 44.72 | ~~64~~ | ~~64~~ | ~~66~~ | — | ~~77~~ | — | — | — | — |

=== Women's 49 kg ===
| Rank | Athlete | Group | Body weight | Snatch (kg) | | | | Clean & Jerk (kg) | | | | Total |
| Rank | Athlete | Group | Body weight | 1 | 2 | 3 | Rank | 1 | 2 | 3 | Rank | Total |
|---|---|---|---|---|---|---|---|---|---|---|---|---|
| 1st place, gold medalist(s) | Mihaela Cambei (ROM) | A | 48.42 | 85 | 90 | 92 ER | 1st place, gold medalist(s) | 100 | 103 | 106 | 1st place, gold medalist(s) | 198 ER |
| 2nd place, silver medalist(s) | Giulia Imperio (ITA) | A | 48.70 | ~~82~~ | ~~82~~ | 83 | 2nd place, silver medalist(s) | 98 | 100 | ~~102~~ | 2nd place, silver medalist(s) | 183 |
| 3rd place, bronze medalist(s) | Anhelina Lomachynska (UKR) | A | 48.66 | 79 | 81 | ~~83~~ | 3rd place, bronze medalist(s) | ~~94~~ | ~~95~~ | 95 | 5 | 176 |
| 4 | Duygu Alıcı (TUR) | A | 48.78 | 76 | 79 | ~~81~~ | 4 | 96 | ~~98~~ | ~~98~~ | 4 | 175 |
| 5 | Tham Nguyen (IRL) | A | 48.66 | 73 | 75 | ~~77~~ | 6 | 96 | ~~98~~ | 98 | 3rd place, bronze medalist(s) | 173 |
| 6 | Oliwia Drzazga (POL) | A | 48.76 | ~~70~~ | 70 | 73 | 10 | 94 | ~~97~~ | ~~97~~ | 6 | 167 |
| 7 | Atenery Hernández (ESP) | B | 48.84 | 72 | ~~74~~ | 74 | 7 | ~~92~~ | ~~92~~ | 92 | 7 | 166 |
| 8 | Mariam Maisuradze (GEO) | A | 48.92 | 70 | 73 | ~~76~~ | 9 | 88 | 92 | ~~95~~ | 8 | 165 |
| 9 | Mara Strzykala (LUX) | B | 48.72 | 64 | 67 | 69 | 11 | 83 | 87 | ~~89~~ | 10 | 156 |
| 10 | Rebecca Copeland (IRL) | B | 48.66 | 62 | 65 | ~~67~~ | 12 | 76 | 79 | ~~81~~ | 11 | 144 |
| 11 | Maria Pipiliaridou (GRE) | B | 48.82 | 55 | 60 | ~~63~~ | 13 | 75 | ~~80~~ | ~~80~~ | 12 | 135 |
| DSQ | Pelinsu Bayav (TUR) | A | 48.74 | 75 | 78 | ~~80~~ | 5 | ~~96~~ | ~~96~~ | — | — | — |
| — | Radmila Zagorac (SRB) | A | 48.18 | ~~71~~ | ~~71~~ | ~~72~~ | — | ~~87~~ | 88 | ~~92~~ | 9 | — |
| — | María Giménez-Guervos (ESP) | A | 48.76 | 72 | 74 | ~~76~~ | 8 | — | — | — | — | — |
| — | Magdalena Dimitrova (BUL) | B | 48.76 | ~~57~~ | ~~57~~ | ~~57~~ | — | 70 | ~~75~~ | 75 | 13 | — |
| — | Monica Csengeri (ROM) | A | 49.00 | ~~84~~ | ~~84~~ | ~~84~~ | — | ~~97~~ | ~~97~~ | ~~97~~ | — | — |

=== Women's 55 kg ===
| Rank | Athlete | Group | Body weight | Snatch (kg) | | | | Clean & Jerk (kg) | | | | Total |
| Rank | Athlete | Group | Body weight | 1 | 2 | 3 | Rank | 1 | 2 | 3 | Rank | Total |
|---|---|---|---|---|---|---|---|---|---|---|---|---|
| 1st place, gold medalist(s) | Andreea Cotruţa (ROU) | A | 54.64 | 87 | ~~91~~ | 91 | 1st place, gold medalist(s) | 107 | ~~110~~ | 110 | 1st place, gold medalist(s) | 201 |
| 2nd place, silver medalist(s) | Svitlana Samuliak (UKR) | A | 54.64 | 90 | ~~92~~ | ~~92~~ | 2nd place, silver medalist(s) | 105 | 109 | ~~112~~ | 2nd place, silver medalist(s) | 199 |
| 3rd place, bronze medalist(s) | Izabella Yaylyan (ARM) | A | 54.86 | ~~87~~ | ~~87~~ | 87 | 3rd place, bronze medalist(s) | 105 | ~~108~~ | 109 | 3rd place, bronze medalist(s) | 196 |
| 4 | Scheila Meister (SUI) | A | 54.80 | 82 | ~~85~~ | 85 | 4 | 102 | 104 | ~~106~~ | 4 | 189 |
| 5 | Annika Pilz (GER) | A | 54.62 | 80 | 83 | ~~85~~ | 6 | 100 | 103 | ~~105~~ | 6 | 186 |
| 6 | Aleksandra Grigoryan (ARM) | A | 53.68 | 77 | ~~80~~ | 80 | 7 | 99 | ~~107~~ | ~~107~~ | 7 | 179 |
| 7 | Marlous Schuilwerve (NED) | B | 54.38 | 74 | 77 | ~~80~~ | 9 | 90 | 94 | ~~98~~ | 9 | 171 |
| 8 | Laura García (ESP) | B | 54.80 | ~~75~~ | ~~75~~ | 75 | 10 | 92 | 94 | ~~96~~ | 10 | 169 |
| 9 | Karina Kecskés (HUN) | B | 54.92 | 68 | 72 | 74 | 12 | 88 | ~~92~~ | 95 | 8 | 169 |
| 10 | Annelien Vandenabeele (BEL) | B | 54.16 | 71 | 74 | ~~76~~ | 11 | 91 | ~~95~~ | ~~95~~ | 11 | 165 |
| 11 | Olga Shapiro (ISR) | B | 54.74 | ~~73~~ | 73 | ~~75~~ | 13 | 82 | 84 | 86 | 12 | 159 |
| 12 | Veronika Hándlová (CZE) | B | 54.24 | ~~66~~ | 66 | ~~72~~ | 14 | 79 | ~~82~~ | ~~83~~ | 14 | 145 |
| 13 | Aistė Anciukevičė (LTU) | B | 54.42 | 58 | ~~61~~ | ~~62~~ | 16 | 78 | 81 | ~~84~~ | 13 | 139 |
| 14 | Margarida Pontes (POR) | B | 53.30 | 59 | ~~64~~ | ~~65~~ | 15 | 79 | ~~83~~ | ~~84~~ | 15 | 138 |
| 15 | Soraia Severino (POR) | B | 52.88 | 55 | ~~60~~ | ~~62~~ | 17 | 75 | ~~78~~ | ~~80~~ | 16 | 130 |
| — | Catrin Jones (GBR) | A | 54.80 | ~~81~~ | ~~81~~ | ~~81~~ | — | 96 | 102 | 104 | 5 | — |
| — | Katrine Bruhn (DEN) | A | 54.94 | 80 | 82 | 84 | 5 | ~~102~~ | ~~102~~ | ~~103~~ | — | — |
| — | Rebekka Jacobsen (NOR) | A | 54.96 | 77 | 79 | ~~80~~ | 8 | ~~104~~ | ~~104~~ | ~~104~~ | — | — |

=== Women's 59 kg ===
| Rank | Athlete | Group | Body weight | Snatch (kg) | | | | Clean & Jerk (kg) | | | | Total |
| Rank | Athlete | Group | Body weight | 1 | 2 | 3 | Rank | 1 | 2 | 3 | Rank | Total |
|---|---|---|---|---|---|---|---|---|---|---|---|---|
| 1st place, gold medalist(s) | Kamila Konotop (UKR) | A | 58.50 | 100 | 104 | 106 ER | 1st place, gold medalist(s) | 120 | 125 | 129 ER | 1st place, gold medalist(s) | 235 ER |
| 2nd place, silver medalist(s) | Nina Sterckx (BEL) | A | 58.82 | 93 | ~~96~~ | ~~97~~ | 2nd place, silver medalist(s) | 113 | 116 | ~~120~~ | 2nd place, silver medalist(s) | 209 |
| 3rd place, bronze medalist(s) | Nadiia Shpilka (UKR) | A | 59.00 | 93 | ~~96~~ | ~~96~~ | 3rd place, bronze medalist(s) | 114 | ~~117~~ | ~~117~~ | 3rd place, bronze medalist(s) | 207 |
| 4 | Garance Rigaud (FRA) | A | 57.32 | 90 | 93 | ~~95~~ | 4 | 110 | ~~114~~ | ~~114~~ | 7 | 203 |
| 5 | Saara Retulainen (FIN) | A | 58.76 | 89 | ~~92~~ | ~~92~~ | 8 | 111 | ~~115~~ | ~~115~~ | 5 | 200 |
| 6 | Jessica Gordon Brown (GBR) | A | 58.70 | 88 | ~~91~~ | ~~91~~ | 9 | 108 | 111 | ~~114~~ | 6 | 199 |
| 7 | Maria Kardara (GRE) | A | 58.92 | 90 | ~~93~~ | ~~94~~ | 5 | 108 | ~~111~~ | ~~112~~ | 8 | 198 |
| 8 | Sabine Kusterer (GER) | A | 58.78 | 87 | ~~90~~ | 90 | 7 | ~~106~~ | ~~107~~ | 107 | 10 | 197 |
| 9 | Irene Martínez (ESP) | A | 58.70 | 87 | ~~90~~ | 90 | 6 | 105 | ~~108~~ | ~~108~~ | 11 | 195 |
| 10 | Galya Shatova (BUL) | A | 58.82 | 88 | ~~91~~ | ~~91~~ | 10 | 105 | ~~110~~ | ~~110~~ | 12 | 193 |
| 11 | Sol Anette Waaler (NOR) | B | 58.00 | 85 | ~~87~~ | 87 | 11 | 104 | ~~106~~ | ~~107~~ | 13 | 191 |
| 12 | Laura Wheatcroft (GBR) | B | 58.86 | ~~82~~ | 82 | ~~87~~ | 15 | 100 | 104 | 107 | 9 | 189 |
| 13 | Þuríður Erla Helgadóttir (ISL) | B | 58.70 | 79 | 82 | ~~84~~ | 14 | 100 | ~~102~~ | 104 | 14 | 186 |
| 14 | Tenishia Thornton (MLT) | B | 58.20 | 82 | 84 | ~~86~~ | 12 | 101 | ~~105~~ | ~~105~~ | 16 | 185 |
| 15 | Hannah Crymble (IRL) | B | 58.58 | 82 | ~~84~~ | ~~84~~ | 13 | 101 | 103 | ~~105~~ | 15 | 185 |
| 16 | Sofia Georgopoulou (GRE) | C | 59.00 | 70 | 75 | 80 | 17 | 90 | 95 | 100 | 18 | 180 |
| 17 | Cintia Andrea Árva (HUN) | C | 58.46 | 73 | ~~76~~ | 76 | 19 | 97 | 101 | ~~103~~ | 17 | 177 |
| 18 | Patricie Ježková (CZE) | B | 58.58 | 80 | ~~83~~ | ~~83~~ | 16 | 97 | ~~101~~ | ~~101~~ | 19 | 177 |
| 19 | Eliška Malcharcziková (CZE) | C | 58.34 | 72 | 75 | 77 | 18 | 88 | 91 | ~~96~~ | 20 | 168 |
| 20 | May Hazan (ISR) | C | 58.66 | 67 | ~~71~~ | ~~71~~ | 20 | ~~85~~ | 85 | 90 | 21 | 157 |
| — | Lucrezia Magistris (ITA) | A | 58.80 | ~~95~~ | ~~96~~ | ~~98~~ | — | — | — | — | — | — |
| — | Amalie Løvind Årsten (DEN) | B | 58.78 | ~~83~~ | ~~83~~ | ~~84~~ | — | 105 | 109 | 112 | 4 | — |
| — | Marianne Saarhelo (FIN) | C | 58.18 | — | — | — | — | — | — | — | — | — |

=== Women's 64 kg ===
| Rank | Athlete | Group | Body weight | Snatch (kg) | | | | Clean & Jerk (kg) | | | | Total |
| Rank | Athlete | Group | Body weight | 1 | 2 | 3 | Rank | 1 | 2 | 3 | Rank | Total |
|---|---|---|---|---|---|---|---|---|---|---|---|---|
| 1st place, gold medalist(s) | Nuray Güngör (TUR) | A | 63.40 | 97 | 99 | ~~101~~ | 1st place, gold medalist(s) | 117 | 120 | ~~122~~ | 3rd place, bronze medalist(s) | 219 |
| 2nd place, silver medalist(s) | Mariia Hanhur (UKR) | A | 63.64 | ~~98~~ | ~~98~~ | 98 | 3rd place, bronze medalist(s) | ~~116~~ | 116 | ~~119~~ | 5 | 214 |
| 3rd place, bronze medalist(s) | Zoe Smith (GBR) | A | 63.66 | 90 | 93 | ~~95~~ | 5 | 119 | 121 | ~~122~~ | 1st place, gold medalist(s) | 214 |
| 4 | Aysel Özkan (TUR) | A | 63.66 | 95 | 98 | ~~100~~ | 2nd place, silver medalist(s) | 115 | ~~117~~ | ~~118~~ | 7 | 213 |
| 5 | Ine Andersson (NOR) | A | 63.08 | 89 | 91 | ~~92~~ | 7 | 117 | 119 | 121 | 2nd place, silver medalist(s) | 212 |
| 6 | Dora Tchakounté (FRA) | A | 59.58 | 93 | ~~98~~ | ~~98~~ | 4 | 113 | 116 | ~~120~~ | 4 | 209 |
| 7 | Hanna Davydova (UKR) | A | 63.76 | ~~93~~ | 93 | ~~96~~ | 6 | ~~110~~ | 110 | ~~115~~ | 11 | 203 |
| 8 | Garoa Martínez (ESP) | B | 63.72 | 85 | ~~89~~ | 90 | 9 | 106 | 109 | 112 | 9 | 202 |
| 9 | Anni Vuohijoki (FIN) | A | 63.62 | ~~88~~ | 89 | ~~91~~ | 11 | ~~112~~ | ~~112~~ | 113 | 8 | 202 |
| 10 | Aino Luostarinen (FIN) | B | 63.62 | 86 | ~~89~~ | ~~89~~ | 13 | 112 | 115 | ~~117~~ | 6 | 201 |
| 11 | Wiktoria Wołk (POL) | A | 63.04 | 85 | 88 | 91 | 8 | 110 | ~~113~~ | ~~113~~ | 10 | 201 |
| 12 | Myrthe Timmermans (NED) | B | 63.56 | 85 | ~~88~~ | ~~89~~ | 15 | 105 | ~~108~~ | 109 | 12 | 194 |
| 13 | Marit Årdalsbakke (NOR) | B | 63.94 | 87 | 89 | ~~91~~ | 10 | 104 | ~~107~~ | ~~108~~ | 15 | 193 |
| 14 | Helena Rønnebæk (DEN) | C | 62.92 | ~~82~~ | 82 | 85 | 14 | 102 | 106 | ~~110~~ | 14 | 191 |
| 15 | Natália Hušťavová (SVK) | B | 63.28 | 80 | 83 | ~~85~~ | 19 | 104 | ~~107~~ | 107 | 13 | 190 |
| 16 | Sonja Bjelić (SRB) | B | 63.46 | 86 | ~~90~~ | ~~91~~ | 12 | 100 | ~~105~~ | ~~105~~ | 19 | 186 |
| 17 | Lucia Kršková (SVK) | B | 63.34 | 81 | 84 | ~~87~~ | 18 | 99 | 102 | ~~104~~ | 17 | 186 |
| 18 | Anush Arshakyan (ARM) | B | 63.60 | 80 | ~~83~~ | ~~83~~ | 20 | ~~104~~ | 104 | ~~108~~ | 16 | 184 |
| 19 | Paula Zikowsky (AUT) | C | 62.48 | 81 | 84 | ~~86~~ | 16 | ~~98~~ | 98 | ~~102~~ | 20 | 182 |
| 20 | Christina Kastrinaki (GRE) | C | 63.84 | ~~84~~ | ~~84~~ | 84 | 17 | 93 | 97 | ~~100~~ | 21 | 181 |
| 21 | Veronika Volná (CZE) | C | 62.82 | 73 | ~~76~~ | ~~76~~ | 24 | 97 | 101 | ~~103~~ | 18 | 174 |
| 22 | Eva Stassijns (BEL) | C | 63.62 | ~~74~~ | 74 | ~~77~~ | 23 | 93 | 96 | ~~99~~ | 22 | 170 |
| 23 | Ivana Gorišek (CRO) | C | 61.74 | 73 | 76 | 78 | 22 | 87 | 90 | ~~93~~ | 23 | 168 |
| — | Emilia Wodzka (DEN) | C | 62.54 | 76 | 79 | ~~81~~ | 21 | ~~89~~ | ~~90~~ | ~~90~~ | — | — |

=== Women's 71 kg ===
| Rank | Athlete | Group | Body weight | Snatch (kg) | | | | Clean & Jerk (kg) | | | | Total |
| Rank | Athlete | Group | Body weight | 1 | 2 | 3 | Rank | 1 | 2 | 3 | Rank | Total |
|---|---|---|---|---|---|---|---|---|---|---|---|---|
| 1st place, gold medalist(s) | Loredana Toma (ROU) | A | | 105 | 110 | ~~115~~ | 1st place, gold medalist(s) | 125 | ~~130~~ | 130 | 1st place, gold medalist(s) | 240 |
| 2nd place, silver medalist(s) | Giulia Miserendino (ITA) | A | | 100 | 105 | ~~110~~ | 2nd place, silver medalist(s) | 125 | ~~128~~ | ~~130~~ | 3rd place, bronze medalist(s) | 230 |
| 3rd place, bronze medalist(s) | Sarah Davies (GBR) | A | | 97 | 100 | ~~102~~ | 4 | ~~126~~ | ~~126~~ | 126 | 2nd place, silver medalist(s) | 226 |
| 4 | Lisa Schweizer (GER) | A | | 100 | 103 | ~~106~~ | 3rd place, bronze medalist(s) | 119 | 122 | ~~126~~ | 5 | 225 |
| 5 | Celia Gold (ISR) | A | | 94 | 97 | 99 | 5 | 118 | 123 | ~~128~~ | 4 | 222 |
| 6 | Eygló Fanndal Sturludóttir (ISL) | A | | 93 | 96 | ~~99~~ | 8 | 116 | 119 | 121 | 6 | 217 |
| 7 | Martyna Dołęga (POL) | A | | 94 | 97 | ~~99~~ | 7 | 115 | 117 | ~~119~~ | 10 | 214 |
| 8 | Daniela Gherman (SWE) | A | | 95 | ~~100~~ | ~~100~~ | 9 | 114 | 119 | ~~123~~ | 8 | 214 |
| 9 | Line Gude (DEN) | B | | 87 | 90 | 93 | 11 | 115 | 120 | ~~125~~ | 7 | 213 |
| 10 | Erin Barton (GBR) | A | | 87 | 91 | ~~94~~ | 13 | 118 | ~~123~~ | ~~123~~ | 9 | 209 |
| 11 | Lijana Jakaitė (LTU) | B | | 90 | 92 | 94 | 10 | ~~113~~ | 113 | ~~115~~ | 12 | 207 |
| 12 | Ilia Hernández (ESP) | B | | 87 | ~~90~~ | ~~91~~ | 15 | 115 | ~~119~~ | ~~122~~ | 11 | 202 |
| 13 | Janette Ylisoini (FIN) | B | | ~~90~~ | 90 | ~~94~~ | 14 | 108 | ~~111~~ | ~~111~~ | 12 | 198 |
| 14 | Antonia Ackermann (GER) | B | | ~~85~~ | 85 | 91 | 12 | 105 | ~~109~~ | ~~109~~ | 14 | 196 |
| 15 | Jannike Bäckström (FIN) | B | | 80 | ~~83~~ | 84 | 16 | 100 | 105 | 107 | 13 | 191 |
| 16 | Gillian Barry (IRL) | B | | 78 | 80 | 82 | 17 | ~~100~~ | ~~100~~ | 100 | 15 | 182 |
| 17 | Simona Hertlová (CZE) | B | | ~~80~~ | ~~80~~ | 80 | 18 | ~~100~~ | ~~100~~ | 100 | 16 | 180 |
| 18 | Mafalda Monteiro (POR) | B | | 75 | ~~79~~ | ~~79~~ | 19 | 97 | ~~101~~ | ~~102~~ | 17 | 172 |
| 19 | Tia Sarah Tovarlaža (CRO) | B | | 71 | ~~75~~ | ~~76~~ | 20 | 90 | ~~95~~ | 95 | 18 | 166 |
| — | Monika Marach (POL) | A | | 98 | ~~101~~ | ~~101~~ | 6 | ~~113~~ | ~~114~~ | ~~115~~ | — | — |
| — | Vicky Graillot (FRA) | B | | — | — | — | — | — | — | — | — | — |

=== Women's 76 kg ===
| Rank | Athlete | Group | Body weight | Snatch (kg) | | | | Clean & Jerk (kg) | | | | Total |
| Rank | Athlete | Group | Body weight | 1 | 2 | 3 | Rank | 1 | 2 | 3 | Rank | Total |
|---|---|---|---|---|---|---|---|---|---|---|---|---|
| 1st place, gold medalist(s) | Marie Fegue (FRA) | A | | ~~108~~ | 108 | 113 | 1st place, gold medalist(s) | 130 | 135 | 140 | 1st place, gold medalist(s) | 253 |
| 2nd place, silver medalist(s) | Tatev Hakobyan (ARM) | A | | 100 | 104 | ~~107~~ | 2nd place, silver medalist(s) | 118 | 122 | ~~126~~ | 3rd place, bronze medalist(s) | 226 |
| 3rd place, bronze medalist(s) | Daniela Ivanova (LAT) | A | | 93 | 96 | ~~99~~ | 5 | 120 | 123 | 126 | 2nd place, silver medalist(s) | 222 |
| 4 | Nicole Rubanovich (ISR) | A | | 97 | 100 | ~~102~~ | 3rd place, bronze medalist(s) | 115 | 119 | ~~121~~ | 5 | 219 |
| 5 | Emma Poghosyan (ARM) | A | | 93 | ~~96~~ | 96 | 6 | 116 | 121 | ~~124~~ | 4 | 217 |
| 6 | Natalia Priscepa (MDA) | A | | 92 | 96 | 98 | 4 | 114 | ~~118~~ | 118 | 7 | 216 |
| 7 | Nikki Löwik (NED) | A | | ~~96~~ | ~~96~~ | 96 | 7 | 115 | 118 | ~~122~~ | 6 | 214 |
| 8 | Alexandrina Ciubotaru (MDA) | B | | ~~89~~ | 89 | 92 | 8 | 112 | ~~117~~ | 117 | 8 | 209 |
| 9 | Laura Vest Tolstrup (DEN) | B | | 88 | 91 | ~~94~~ | 9 | ~~113~~ | ~~113~~ | 113 | 10 | 204 |
| 10 | Lea Berle Horne (NOR) | A | | 86 | ~~89~~ | ~~89~~ | 12 | 115 | ~~119~~ | ~~120~~ | 9 | 201 |
| 11 | Nina Rondziková (SVK) | A | | ~~87~~ | 87 | 90 | 10 | 110 | ~~113~~ | ~~113~~ | 11 | 200 |
| 12 | Jutta Selin (FIN) | B | | 86 | ~~89~~ | 89 | 11 | 109 | ~~113~~ | ~~113~~ | 12 | 198 |
| 13 | Maiken Buch Christensen (DEN) | B | | 85 | ~~88~~ | ~~90~~ | 13 | 104 | 108 | ~~112~~ | 13 | 193 |
| 14 | Despoina Charitopoulou (GRE) | B | | 80 | ~~84~~ | 84 | 15 | ~~103~~ | 103 | ~~107~~ | 15 | 187 |
| 15 | Simona Jeřábková (CZE) | B | | 80 | 84 | ~~87~~ | 14 | 98 | 102 | ~~104~~ | 16 | 186 |
| 16 | Despoina Polaktsidou (GRE) | B | | ~~80~~ | ~~80~~ | 80 | 18 | 100 | 105 | ~~108~~ | 14 | 185 |
| 17 | Teresa Tavares (POR) | B | | 77 | 80 | ~~83~~ | 17 | 96 | ~~100~~ | ~~100~~ | 17 | 176 |
| — | Ivona Gavran (CRO) | B | | 80 | ~~85~~ | ~~86~~ | 16 | ~~100~~ | ~~100~~ | ~~100~~ | — | — |
| — | Nadia Oualit (ESP) | A | | ~~91~~ | ~~91~~ | ~~91~~ | — | ~~112~~ | ~~112~~ | ~~112~~ | — | — |

=== Women's 81 kg ===
| Rank | Athlete | Group | Body weight | Snatch (kg) | | | | Clean & Jerk (kg) | | | | Total |
| Rank | Athlete | Group | Body weight | 1 | 2 | 3 | Rank | 1 | 2 | 3 | Rank | Total |
|---|---|---|---|---|---|---|---|---|---|---|---|---|
| 1st place, gold medalist(s) | Iryna Dekha (UKR) | A | | 115 | 120 | 123 | 1st place, gold medalist(s) | 135 | ~~139~~ | ~~139~~ | 1st place, gold medalist(s) | 258 |
| 2nd place, silver medalist(s) | Dilara Narin (TUR) | A | | ~~101~~ | 101 | ~~104~~ | 3rd place, bronze medalist(s) | 130 | 134 | ~~137~~ | 2nd place, silver medalist(s) | 235 |
| 3rd place, bronze medalist(s) | Elena Erighina (MDA) | A | | 100 | ~~104~~ | 104 | 2nd place, silver medalist(s) | 125 | 130 | ~~134~~ | 4 | 234 |
| 4 | Sara Yenigün (TUR) | A | | ~~95~~ | 95 | 100 | 4 | 127 | ~~131~~ | 131 | 3rd place, bronze medalist(s) | 231 |
| 5 | Katrina Feklistova (GBR) | A | | 98 | ~~101~~ | ~~102~~ | 7 | 118 | 122 | 125 | 8 | 223 |
| 6 | Gintarė Bražaitė (LTU) | B | | ~~93~~ | 93 | 96 | 8 | 115 | 120 | 124 | 7 | 220 |
| 7 | Weronika Zielińska-Stubińska (POL) | B | | 93 | 96 | 98 | 5 | 117 | ~~120~~ | 121 | 6 | 219 |
| 8 | Ida Rönn (SWE) | B | | 93 | ~~97~~ | ~~97~~ | 12 | 120 | ~~125~~ | 125 | 5 | 218 |
| 9 | Natia Gadelia (GEO) | B | | 90 | 94 | ~~97~~ | 10 | 115 | 121 | ~~125~~ | 9 | 215 |
| 10 | Liana Gyurjyan (ARM) | A | | ~~95~~ | 95 | ~~99~~ | 9 | 120 | ~~126~~ | ~~126~~ | 10 | 215 |
| 11 | Nina Schroth (GER) | A | | 98 | ~~101~~ | ~~102~~ | 6 | 113 | ~~116~~ | 116 | 13 | 214 |
| 12 | Nikola Seničová (SVK) | B | | ~~94~~ | ~~94~~ | 94 | 11 | 112 | 116 | ~~121~~ | 12 | 210 |
| 13 | Anna Amroyan (ARM) | B | | 85 | ~~91~~ | ~~91~~ | 13 | 107 | 113 | 117 | 11 | 202 |
| — | Anna Van Bellinghen (BEL) | B | | — | — | — | — | — | — | — | — | — |
| — | Eliise Peterson (EST) | B | | — | — | — | — | — | — | — | — | — |

=== Women's 87 kg ===
| Rank | Athlete | Group | Body weight | Snatch (kg) | | | | Clean & Jerk (kg) | | | | Total |
| Rank | Athlete | Group | Body weight | 1 | 2 | 3 | Rank | 1 | 2 | 3 | Rank | Total |
|---|---|---|---|---|---|---|---|---|---|---|---|---|
| 1st place, gold medalist(s) | Solfrid Koanda (NOR) | A | | ~~110~~ | 110 | 117 | 1st place, gold medalist(s) | 145 | 153 | 155 | 1st place, gold medalist(s) | 272 |
| 2nd place, silver medalist(s) | Anastasiia Manievska (UKR) | A | | 103 | 105 | 108 | 2nd place, silver medalist(s) | 125 | 130 | ~~135~~ | 2nd place, silver medalist(s) | 238 |
| 3rd place, bronze medalist(s) | Hripsime Khurshudyan (ARM) | A | | 100 | 104 | 107 | 3rd place, bronze medalist(s) | 120 | ~~127~~ | – | 3rd place, bronze medalist(s) | 227 |
| 4 | Jéssica da Silva (POR) | A | | 92 | 96 | ~~101~~ | 4 | ~~118~~ | ~~118~~ | 118 | 4 | 214 |
| 5 | Veronika Mitykó (HUN) | A | | ~~95~~ | 95 | ~~99~~ | 5 | 105 | 110 | 112 | 5 | 207 |
| 6 | Lenka Žembová (SVK) | A | | 89 | 92 | ~~94~~ | 7 | 105 | 107 | 109 | 7 | 201 |
| 7 | Margarita Arakelyan (ARM) | A | | 85 | ~~90~~ | ~~90~~ | 10 | 105 | 111 | ~~115~~ | 6 | 196 |
| 8 | Eliška Šmigová (CZE) | A | | 82 | 85 | 88 | 9 | 102 | 105 | 107 | 8 | 195 |
| — | Paula Junhov Rindberg (SWE) | A | | 87 | 90 | ~~93~~ | 8 | ~~106~~ | ~~107~~ | ~~107~~ | — | — |
| — | Agnieszka Zimroz (POL) | A | | 82 | 89 | ~~94~~ | 6 | ~~106~~ | ~~106~~ | ~~107~~ | — | — |
| — | Viktória Boros (HUN) | A | — | — | — | — | — | — | — | — | — | — |

=== Women's +87 kg ===
| Rank | Athlete | Group | Body weight | Snatch (kg) | | | | Clean & Jerk (kg) | | | | Total |
| Rank | Athlete | Group | Body weight | 1 | 2 | 3 | Rank | 1 | 2 | 3 | Rank | Total |
|---|---|---|---|---|---|---|---|---|---|---|---|---|
| 1st place, gold medalist(s) | Emily Campbell (GBR) | A | | ~~110~~ | ~~110~~ | 110 | 4 | 136 | 143 | — | 1st place, gold medalist(s) | 253 |
| 2nd place, silver medalist(s) | Anastasiia Hotfrid (GEO) | A | | 111 | 114 | 117 | 1st place, gold medalist(s) | 128 | 132 | 135 | 2nd place, silver medalist(s) | 252 |
| 3rd place, bronze medalist(s) | Valentyna Kisil (UKR) | A | | 105 | 108 | 111 | 2nd place, silver medalist(s) | 126 | 130 | 133 | 4 | 244 |
| 4 | Melike Günal (TUR) | A | | 105 | 108 | 110 | 3rd place, bronze medalist(s) | 126 | 130 | 132 | 5 | 242 |
| 5 | Sarah Fischer (AUT) | A | | 99 | ~~103~~ | 104 | 5 | 128 | 132 | 134 | 3rd place, bronze medalist(s) | 238 |
| 6 | Tuana Süren (TUR) | A | | 100 | 103 | ~~106~~ | 6 | 127 | 131 | ~~134~~ | 6 | 234 |
| 7 | Dzhesika Ivanova (BUL) | A | | 88 | 91 | 93 | 9 | 110 | 118 | 121 | 7 | 214 |
| 8 | Johanna Pfeilstöcker (AUT) | A | | 92 | 95 | 97 | 7 | 109 | 113 | 116 | 9 | 213 |
| 9 | Julieta Avanesyan (ARM) | A | | 90 | 95 | ~~97~~ | 8 | 110 | 116 | ~~119~~ | 8 | 211 |
| 10 | Tereza Králová (CZE) | A | | 85 | 88 | 91 | 10 | 105 | 110 | ~~115~~ | 10 | 201 |
| 11 | Barbara Gyürüs (HUN) | A | | 80 | 84 | 87 | 11 | 100 | 104 | ~~106~~ | 11 | 191 |

== Incidents ==
During the opening ceremony, designer Aram Nikolyan who worked on the show, ran out of the front rows and set fire to the flag of Azerbaijan. Media reported the event in the context of rising tensions between Armenia and Azerbaijan over the Lachin corridor which has been blockaded by Azeris and is the only road that connects the ethnically Armenian Nagorno-Karabakh to the outside world. The flag burning followed fighting between the two countries near the Lachin corridor which left soldiers dead on both sides. Nikolyan was detained and the flag was replaced. Azerbaijan recalled its team after the incident. Armenian officials condemned the incident and a criminal investigation was opened against Nikolyan. The European Weightlifting Federation also condemned the incident.

Turkish athlete Bayav Pallinsu competing in up to 49 kg category lost consciousness at the attempt of raising the barbell and had to be given first aid.

== See also ==
- Armenian Weightlifting Federation
- List of European Weightlifting Championships medalists
- Weightlifting in Armenia
