= 2021 World Weightlifting Championships – Women's 81 kg =

Weightlifting Championship

The women's 81 kilograms competition at the 2021 World Weightlifting Championships was held on 15 December 2021.

== Schedule ==
Date	Time	Event
15 December 2021	16:00	Group A

== Medalists ==
Event	Gold		Silver		Bronze	
Snatch	Alina Marushchak (UKR)	113 kg	Kim I-seul (KOR)	108 kg	Eileen Cikamatana (AUS)	108 kg
Clean & Jerk	Alina Marushchak (UKR)	135 kg	Valeria Rivas (COL)	134 kg	Dayana Chirinos (VEN)	134 kg
Total	Alina Marushchak (UKR)	248 kg	Valeria Rivas (COL)	239 kg	Kim I-seul (KOR)	238 kg

== Records ==
Prior to this competition, the existing world records were as follows.

World Record	Snatch	World Standard	127 kg	—	1 November 2018
World Record	Clean & Jerk	World Standard	158 kg	—	1 November 2018
World Record	Total	World Standard	283 kg	—	1 November 2018

== Results ==
Rank	Athlete	Group	Snatch (kg)				Clean & Jerk (kg)				Total
Rank	Athlete	Group	1	2	3	Rank	1	2	3	Rank	Total
1st place, gold medalist(s)	Alina Marushchak (UKR)	A	108	111	113	1st place, gold medalist(s)	131	135	~~139~~	1st place, gold medalist(s)	248
2nd place, silver medalist(s)	Valeria Rivas (COL)	A	105	~~109~~	~~109~~	4	130	134	~~136~~	2nd place, silver medalist(s)	239
3rd place, bronze medalist(s)	Kim I-seul (KOR)	A	105	108	~~112~~	2nd place, silver medalist(s)	~~130~~	130	~~135~~	4	238
4	Dayana Chirinos (VEN)	A	102	~~106~~	~~106~~	6	131	134	~~137~~	3rd place, bronze medalist(s)	236
5	Tatev Hakobyan (ARM)	A	~~105~~	~~105~~	105	5	125	~~134~~	~~135~~	5	230
6	Elham Hosseini (IRI)	A	91	96	98	8	116	~~125~~	125	6	223
7	Anna Van Bellinghen (BEL)	A	97	100	102	7	116	120	~~123~~	7	222
8	Aýsoltan Toýçyýewa (TKM)	A	90	~~92~~	93	10	111	114	116	8	209
9	Nikola Seničová (SVK)	A	88	93	~~97~~	9	108	113	~~117~~	9	206
—	Eileen Cikamatana (AUS)	A	~~108~~	~~108~~	108	3rd place, bronze medalist(s)	~~141~~	~~141~~	~~141~~	—	—
