= Tom Goegebuer =

Belgian weightlifter (born 1975)

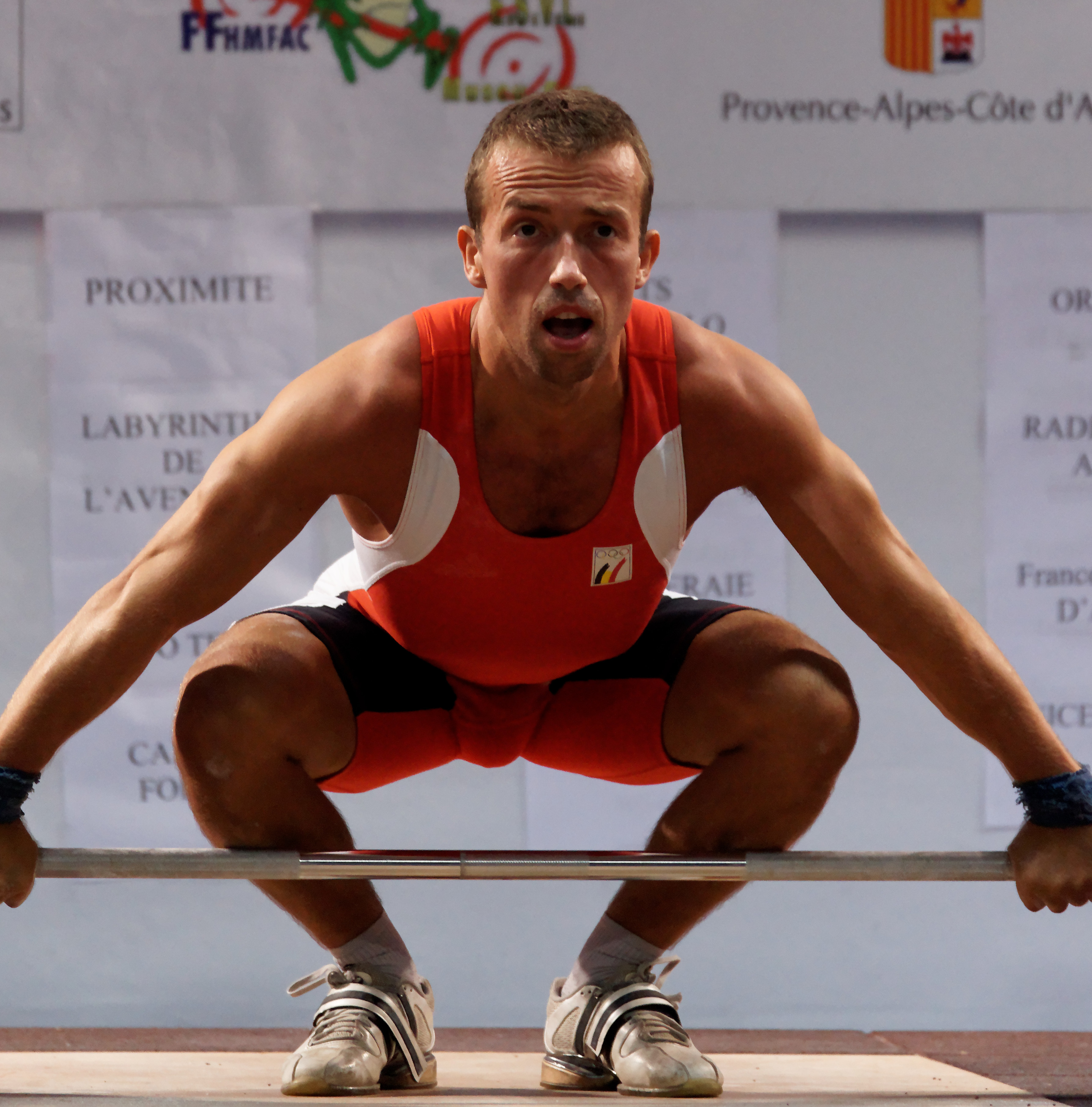

Personal information
- Full name: Tom Richard Goegebuer
- Born: 27 March 1975 (age 51)
- Height: 1.64 m (5 ft 4 1/2 in)
- Weight: 56 kg (123 lb)

Sport
- Country: Belgium
- Sport: Weightlifting
- Event: 56 kg
- Coached by: Richard Goegebuer
Medal record
Men's Weightlifting
Representing Belgium
European Championships
Gold medal – first place	2009 Bucharest	– 56 kg
Silver medal – second place	2008 Lignano	– 56 kg
Bronze medal – third place	2010 Minsk	– 56 kg
Bronze medal – third place	2013 Tirana	– 56 kg
- Updated on 8 April 2013

Tom Richard Goegebuer (born 27 March 1975) is a former Belgian weightlifter competing in the 62 kg and 56 kg category. He is 164 cm tall (5 ft 5 inches). Having ended his career as a weightlifter in November 2016, he remained active in the sport and on 1 January 2017 became the chairman of the Royal Belgian Weightlifting Association succeeding Thierry Zutterman. He coaches Belgian weightlifter Nina Sterckx.

== Career ==
He competed in Weightlifting at the 2008 Summer Olympics in the 56 kg division finishing thirteenth with 251 kg. This improved his own Belgian record by 1 kg. In the 62 kg category, he participated in several Senior World Championships: 1997 Thailand, 1998 Finland, 1999 Greece, 2001 Turkey, 2005 Qatar, 2006 Dominican Republic, and 2007 Thailand.

Since 1999 he competed in all the European Senior Championships. At the 2008 European Championships he won overall silver in the 56 kg category, with a total of 244 kg.

At the 2009 European Championships he won overall gold in the 56 kg category, with a total of 252 kg.

At the 2010 European Championships he came only 2 kg short of the European title -56 kg with a new Belgian record of 254 kg total. With 116 kg snatch and 138 kg clean & jerk he came 3rd.

At the 2012 Summer Olympics, he finished 12th with a total of 247 kg.

== National records ==
Category	Snatch	Jerk	Total
-62 kg	127.5 kg	155 kg	277.5 kg
-56 kg	116 kg	140 kg	254 kg

== Honours and awards ==
- Belgian Olympic and Interfederal Committee Order of Merit: 2024
- Flemish Sportsjewel: 2009
