= Nina Sterckx =

Belgian weightlifter (born 2002)

Personal information
- Born: 26 July 2002 (age 24)

Sport
- Country: Belgium
- Sport: Weightlifting
- Weight class: 49 kg; 55 kg; 59 kg
- Coached by: Tom Goegebuer
Medal record
Women's weightlifting
Representing Belgium
European Championships
Gold medal – first place	2026 Batumi	53 kg
Silver medal – second place	2023 Yerevan	59 kg
Silver medal – second place	2025 Chișinău	59 kg
Bronze medal – third place	2021 Moscow	55 kg
Bronze medal – third place	2022 Tirana	55 kg
Junior World Championships
Gold medal – first place	2022 Heraklion	55 kg
Silver medal – second place	2021 Tashkent	55 kg
European Junior & U23 Championships
Gold medal – first place	2019 Bucharest	49 kg
Gold medal – first place	2022 Durrës	55 kg

Nina Sterckx (born 26 July 2002) is a Belgian weightlifter. She is a five-time medalist at the European Weightlifting Championships and achieved 5th place representing Belgium at the 2020 Summer Olympics in Tokyo, Japan. She also represented Belgium at the 2024 Summer Olympics in Paris, France.

In 2019, Sterckx won the gold medal in the women's junior 49 kg event at the European Junior & U23 Weightlifting Championships in Bucharest, Romania. She also won the gold medal in the women's 55 kg event at the 2022 Junior World Weightlifting Championships held in Heraklion, Greece.

== Career ==
Sterckx won the silver medal in the under-15 girls 48 kg event at the 2017 European Youth Weightlifting Championships held in Pristina, Kosovo. She won the bronze medal in the under-17 girls 53 kg event at the 2018 European Youth Weightlifting Championships held in San Donato Milanese, Italy.

Both in 2018 and 2019, Sterckx competed in the women's 55 kg event at the World Weightlifting Championships. In 2018, she also competed in the women's 53 kg event at the European Weightlifting Championships held in Bucharest, Romania. In 2019, she finished in 8th place at the European Weightlifting Championships held in Batumi, Georgia.

In April 2021, Sterckx won the bronze medal in the women's 55 kg event at the European Weightlifting Championships held in Moscow, Russia. In May 2021, she won the silver medal in her event at the Junior World Weightlifting Championships held in Tashkent, Uzbekistan.

She won the silver medal in the women's 55 kg event at the 2021 Junior World Weightlifting Championships held in Tashkent, Uzbekistan. In July 2021, Sterckx represented Belgium at the 2020 Summer Olympics in Tokyo, Japan. Her goal was to compete at the 2024 Summer Olympics in Paris, France but her result at the Junior World Weightlifting Championships, limits on the number of athletes per NOC and doping violations of other countries meant that she ranked 8th in the 49 kg weight class, allowing her to qualify for the 2020 Summer Olympics. Sterckx finished in 5th place in the women's 49 kg event. She lifted 81 kg in the Snatch, 99 kg in the Clean & Jerk and she set a new Belgian record of 180 kg in total.

Sterckx won the gold medal in the women's 55 kg event at the 2022 Junior World Weightlifting Championships held in Heraklion, Greece. It was the first time a weightlifter representing Belgium became junior world champion. She won the bronze medal in her event at the 2022 European Weightlifting Championships held in Tirana, Albania. She also won the bronze medals in the Snatch and Clean & Jerk events with lifts of 94 kg and 111 kg respectively.

Sterckx won the gold medal in her event at the 2022 European Junior & U23 Weightlifting Championships held in Durrës, Albania. She also set new junior world records in the Clean & Jerk (118 kg) and in total (213 kg). In preparation for the 2024 Summer Olympics, which only features the women's 49 kg and 59 kg weight classes, she decided to move down from the 55 kg to the 49 kg weight class in this competition. Sterckx finished in 6th place in the women's 49 kg event at the 2022 World Weightlifting Championships held in Bogotá, Colombia.

Sterckx won the silver medal in the women's 59 kg event at the 2023 European Weightlifting Championships held in Yerevan, Armenia. She also won the silver medals in the Snatch and Clean & Jerk events. In April 2023, she stated that she would decide on competing in the 49 kg or 59 kg weight class at the 2024 Summer Olympics after the Olympic qualification period. She competed in the women's 59 kg event at the 2023 World Weightlifting Championships held in Riyadh, Saudi Arabia.

In February 2024, Sterckx competed in the women's 59 kg event at the European Weightlifting Championships held in Sofia, Bulgaria. She won the silver medal in the Snatch event and she was unable to complete a Clean & Jerk. In August 2024, Sterckx competed in the women's 49 kg event at the 2024 Summer Olympics held in Paris, France. She failed three attempts to lift 86 kg in the Snatch and she did not compete in the Clean & Jerk. After the Olympics, she switched coaches and started training under the guidance of American Wil Fleming.

In April 2025, Sterckx competed in the women's 59 kg event at the European Weightlifting Championships held in Chișinău, Moldova. She made only her openers in both events but that was enough to win the gold medal in the Snatch event, the bronze medal in the Clean & Jerk and the silver medal overall. She competed in the women's 58 kg event at the 2025 World Weightlifting Championships held in Førde, Norway, where after a good start in the Snatch event, she failed to register a score in the Clean & Jerk.

Early 2026, six weeks before the European Weightlifting Championships in Batumi, Georgia Sterckx' American coach Wil Fleming parted ways with her. At those championships Sterckx won the gold medal in the women's 53 kg event. In October she competed in the women's 53 kg event at the 2026 World Weightlifting Championships held in Ningbo, China but disappointed, failing to register a score in the Snatch event.

== Achievements ==
Year	Venue	Weight	Snatch (kg)				Clean & Jerk (kg)				Total	Rank
Year	Venue	Weight	1	2	3	Rank	1	2	3	Rank	Total	Rank
Summer Olympics
2021	Tokyo, Japan	49 kg	~~81~~	81	~~84~~	—N/a	99	~~101~~	~~101~~	—N/a	180	5
2024	Paris, France	49 kg	~~86~~	~~86~~	~~86~~	—N/a	—	—	—	—N/a	DNF	—
World Championships
2018	Ashgabat, Turkmenistan	55 kg	75	78	81	23	94	98	101	25	182	24
2019	Pattaya, Thailand	55 kg	80	83	85	15	99	~~102~~	102	21	187	18
2022	Bogotá, Colombia	49 kg	85	88	89	4	104	~~109~~	~~109~~	7	193	6
2023	Riyadh, Saudi Arabia	59 kg	95	97	99	8	117	121	~~123~~	12	220	9
2025	Førde, Norway	58 kg	92	~~95~~	95	8	~~110~~	~~110~~	~~110~~	—	—	—
2026	Ningbo, China	53 kg	~~94~~	~~94~~	~~94~~	—	112	~~117~~	~~121~~	6	—	—
IWF World Cup
2024	Phuket, Thailand	59 kg	96	100	~~102~~	9	111	116	~~121~~	15	216	13
European Championships
2018	Bucharest, Romania	53 kg	70	73	~~75~~	12	88	91	~~94~~	10	164	12
2019	Batumi, Georgia	55 kg	77	80	82	6	96	~~100~~	101	8	183	8
2021	Moscow, Russia	55 kg	~~87~~	~~87~~	88	5	103	~~108~~	109	4	197	3rd place, bronze medalist(s)
2022	Tirana, Albania	55 kg	90	~~93~~	94	3rd place, bronze medalist(s)	~~109~~	~~109~~	111	3rd place, bronze medalist(s)	205	3rd place, bronze medalist(s)
2023	Yerevan, Armenia	59 kg	93	~~96~~	~~97~~	2nd place, silver medalist(s)	113	116	~~120~~	2nd place, silver medalist(s)	209	2nd place, silver medalist(s)
2024	Sofia, Bulgaria	59 kg	98	101	~~103~~	2nd place, silver medalist(s)	~~117~~	~~118~~	~~122~~	—	—	—
2025	Chișinău, Moldova	59 kg	94	~~97~~	~~97~~	1st place, gold medalist(s)	113	~~117~~	~~120~~	3rd place, bronze medalist(s)	207	2nd place, silver medalist(s)
2026	Batumi, Georgia	53 kg	88	91	94	2nd place, silver medalist(s)	107	~~112~~	116	1st place, gold medalist(s)	210	1st place, gold medalist(s)
