= Anna Van Bellinghen =

Belgian weightlifter (born 1994)

Personal information
- Born: 10 March 1994 (age 32)

Sport
- Country: Belgium
- Sport: Weightlifting
Medal record
Women's weightlifting
Representing Belgium
European Championships
Silver medal – second place	2019 Batumi	81 kg
IWF World Cup
Bronze medal – third place	2020 Rome	81 kg
European Junior & U23 Championships
Bronze medal – third place	2017 Durrës	90 kg (U23)

Anna Van Bellinghen, sometimes written as Anna Vanbellinghen (born 10 March 1994) is a Belgian weightlifter. She is a silver medalist at the European Weightlifting Championships. She also represented Belgium at the 2020 Summer Olympics in Tokyo, Japan.

== Career ==
Van Bellinghen represented Belgium at the 2013 Summer Universiade held in Kazan, Russia and finished in 12th place in the women's 75 kg event. In 2015, she won the bronze medal in the Clean & Jerk in the women's under-23 +75 kg event at the European Junior & U23 Weightlifting Championships held in Klaipeda, Lithuania. In that year, she also competed in the women's +75 kg event at the 2015 World Weightlifting Championships held in Houston, United States.

In 2017, Van Bellinghen represented Belgium at the Summer Universiade held in Taipei, Taiwan in the women's 90 kg event. She finished in 5th place. A few months later, she won the bronze medal in the women's under-23 90 kg event at the 2017 European Junior & U23 Weightlifting Championships held in Durrës, Albania. In that same year, she also competed in the women's 90 kg event at both the 2017 European Weightlifting Championships held in Split, Croatia and the 2017 World Weightlifting Championships held in Anaheim, United States.

Van Bellinghen competed in the women's 90 kg event at the 2018 European Weightlifting Championships held in Bucharest, Romania. A few months later, she won the gold medal in the women's 90 kg event at the FISU World University Weightlifting Championships held in Biała Podlaska, Poland. She also competed in the women's 81 kg event at the 2018 World Weightlifting Championships held in Ashgabat, Turkmenistan.

At the 2019 European Weightlifting Championships held in Batumi, Georgia, she won the bronze medal in the women's 81 kg event. This became the silver medal after disqualification of the original gold medalist Eleni Konstantinidi of Greece for after testing positive for prohibited substances. She also won the gold medal in the Snatch event and, as a result of the disqualification, the bronze medal in the Clean & Jerk. At the British International Open 2019 held in Coventry, Great Britain, she won the bronze medal in the women's 87 kg event. In that same year, she also competed in the women's 81 kg event at the 2019 World Weightlifting Championships held in Pattaya, Thailand without winning a medal. In this competition, she lifted 99 kg in the Snatch event but failed to register a successful result in the Clean & Jerk.

In 2020, she won the bronze medal in the women's 81 kg event at the Roma 2020 World Cup in Rome, Italy. She also won the bronze medals in the Snatch and Clean & Jerk events. In 2021, she finished in 7th place in the women's +87 kg event at the European Weightlifting Championships held in Moscow, Russia.

Van Bellinghen represented Belgium at the 2020 Summer Olympics in Tokyo, Japan. She finished in 11th place in the women's +87 kg event. In December 2021, she finished in 7th place in the women's 81 kg event at the World Weightlifting Championships held in Tashkent, Uzbekistan.

== Achievements ==
Year	Venue	Weight	Snatch (kg)				Clean & Jerk (kg)				Total	Rank
Year	Venue	Weight	1	2	3	Rank	1	2	3	Rank	Total	Rank
Summer Olympics
2021	Tokyo, Japan	+87 kg	96	~~100~~	~~100~~	—N/a	115	119	123	—N/a	219	11
World Championships
2015	Houston, United States	+75 kg	98	~~100~~	100	27	123	126	129	25	229	26
2017	Anaheim, United States	90 kg	97	~~101~~	101	9	117	121	~~124~~	10	222	10
2018	Ashgabat, Turkmenistan	81 kg	~~98~~	98	~~102~~	11	117	120	122	11	220	12
2019	Pattaya, Thailand	81 kg	99	~~102~~	~~102~~	13	~~117~~	~~118~~	~~118~~	—	—	—
2021	Tashkent, Uzbekistan	81 kg	97	100	102	7	116	120	~~123~~	7	222	7
European Championships
2017	Split, Croatia	90 kg	102	~~106~~	~~107~~	4	122	127	~~129~~	3	229	4
2018	Bucharest, Romania	90 kg	97	100	102	2nd place, silver medalist(s)	117	122	~~125~~	4	224	4
2019	(Georgia (country)) Batumi, Georgia	81 kg	98	101	103	1st place, gold medalist(s)	118	~~121~~	~~121~~	3rd place, bronze medalist(s)	221	2nd place, silver medalist(s)
2021	Moscow, Russia	+87 kg	~~90~~	90	94	7	107	111	114	9	208	7
World Cup
2020	Rome, Italy	81 kg	100	103	105	3rd place, bronze medalist(s)	117	~~122~~	122	3rd place, bronze medalist(s)	227	3rd place, bronze medalist(s)
