= Tatev Hakobyan =

Armenian weightlifter (born 1996)

Personal information
- Native name: Տաթև Հակոբյան
- Born: 21 March 1996 (age 30)

Sport
- Country: Armenia
- Sport: Weightlifting
Medal record
Women's weightlifting
Representing Armenia
European Championships
Silver medal – second place	2023 Yerevan	76 kg
Bronze medal – third place	2017 Split	90 kg
Qatar Cup
Gold medal – first place	2019 Doha	87 kg

Tatev Hakobyan (born 21 March 1996) is an Armenian weightlifter. She won the silver medal in the women's 76 kg event at the 2023 European Weightlifting Championships held in Yerevan, Armenia. She also won the bronze medal in the women's 90 kg event at the 2017 European Weightlifting Championships held in Split, Croatia.

In 2018, Hakobyan competed in the women's 81 kg event at the World Weightlifting Championships held in Ashgabat, Turkmenistan where she failed to register a successful result in the Snatch event.

In 2019, Hakobyan won the silver medal in the under-23 women's 87 kg event at the European Junior & U23 Weightlifting Championships in Bucharest, Romania. In that same year, she also won the gold medal in the women's 87 kg event at the 6th International Qatar Cup held in Doha, Qatar.

She finished in 5th place in the women's 81 kg event at the 2021 World Weightlifting Championships held in Tashkent, Uzbekistan. A year later, she was 9th in the women's 76 kg in 2022 World Weightlifting Championships.
