= Yusuf Fehmi Genç =

Turkish weightlifter (born 2002)

Personal information
- Born: 23 May 2002 (age 24) Ordu, Turkey
- Education: Gazi University
- Height: 1.70 m (5 ft 7 in)
- Weight: 73 kg (161 lb)

Sport
- Country: Turkey
- Sport: Weightlifting
- Club: Ankara ASKİ
Medal record
Men's weightlifting
Representing Turkey
World Championships
Bronze medal – third place	2024 Manama	67 kg
European Championships
Gold medal – first place	2025 Chișinău	73 kg
Gold medal – first place	2026 Batumi	71 kg
Islamic Solidarity Games
Gold medal – first place	2021 Konya	67 kg CJ
Gold medal – first place	2025 Riyadh	71 kg CJ
Gold medal – first place	2025 Riyadh	71 kg T
Bronze medal – third place	2021 Konya	67 kg T
Mediterranean Games
Gold medal – first place	2026 Taranto	75 kg CJ
Silver medal – second place	2026 Taranto	75 kg S
European U23 Championships
Gold medal – first place	2024 Raszyn	67 kg
Gold medal – first place	2025 Durres	71 kg
World Junior Championships
Silver medal – second place	2022 Heraklion	67 kg
Bronze medal – third place	2021 Tashkent	67 kg
European Junior Championships
Silver medal – second place	2021 Rovaniemi	67 kg
Silver medal – second place	2022 Durrës	67 kg
Youth World Championships
Silver medal – second place	2019 Las Vegas	61 kg
European Youth Championships
Gold medal – first place	2019 Eilat	61 kg

Yusuf Fehmi Genç (born 23 May 2002) is a Turkish weightlifter competing in the 73 kg division. He won the gold medal at the 2025 European Weightlifting Championships.

== Career ==
In 2021, he won a bronze medal in his event at the Junior World Weightlifting Championships held in Tashkent, Uzbekistan.

At the 2022 World Weightlifting Championships held in Bogotá, Colombia, Yusuf Fehmi Genç, competing in the 67 kg category, placed eighth in the snatch with 140 kg, gold in the jerk with 182 kg, and fourth in the total with 322 kg. With this success, he brought Turkey a gold medal in men's weightlifting for the first time in 7 years.

Yusuf Fehmi Genç in men's 73 kg at the 2023 European Weightlifting Championships in Yerevan, Armenia, placed ninth in the snatch with 146 kg, gold medal in the jerk with 186 kg and fifth in the total with 332 kg.

Yusuf Fehmi Genç won the gold medal at the 2024 European Junior and U23 Weightlifting Championships held at the Raszyn Centrum Sports Hall in Warsaw, Poland, men's 67 kg category with 144 kg in the snatch, 176 kg in the jerk and 320 kg in total. Yusuf Fehmi Genç finished third at the 2024 World Weightlifting Championships in Manama, Bahrain, with 181 kg in the 67 kg weightlifting and 327 kg in total. He won 2 bronze medals with this degree.

At the 2025 European Weightlifting Championships held in Chișinău, Moldova. Yusuf Fehmi Genç won the silver medal for snatch, and gold for jerk and total in the men's 73 kg . He broke the European record with 194 kg in the jerk. His 348 kg in total is equal to the European Record.

== Achievements ==
Year	Venue	Weight	Snatch (kg)				Clean & Jerk (kg)				Total	Rank
Year	Venue	Weight	1	2	3	Rank	1	2	3	Rank	Total	Rank
World Championships
2021	Tashkent, Uzbekistan	67 kg	125	~~128~~	~~130~~	16	~~160~~	160	165	8	290	14
2022	Bogotá, Colombia	67 kg	~~135~~	136	140	9	175	179	182	1st place, gold medalist(s)	322	4
2023	Riyadh, Saudi Arabia	73 kg	145	148	~~150~~	9	~~185~~	~~186~~	~~187~~	—	DNF	—
2024	Manama, Bahrain	67 kg	141	146	~~149~~	4	~~179~~	181	~~187~~	3rd place, bronze medalist(s)	327	3rd place, bronze medalist(s)
2025	Førde, Norway	71 kg	~~150~~	~~151~~	151	6	186	190	192 ER	3rd place, bronze medalist(s)	343 ER	4
European Championships
2021	Moscow, Russia	67 kg	125	130	~~132~~	11	~~166~~	167	~~173~~	7	297	9
2022	Tirana, Albania	67 kg	125	~~129~~	~~129~~	7	161	164	167	2nd place, silver medalist(s)	292	5
2023	Yerevan, Armenia	73 kg	140	143	146	9	181	184	186	1st place, gold medalist(s)	332	5
2024	Sofia, Bulgaria	73 kg	140	144	~~146~~	12	180	184	~~186~~	3rd place, bronze medalist(s)	328	6
2025	Chișinău, Moldova	73 kg	147	151	154	2nd place, silver medalist(s)	187	194 ER	~~195~~	1st place, gold medalist(s)	348 ER	1st place, gold medalist(s)
2026	Batumi, Georgia	71 kg	~~146~~	~~147~~	147	3rd place, bronze medalist(s)	185	~~193~~	~~193~~	1st place, gold medalist(s)	332	1st place, gold medalist(s)
Islamic Solidarity Games
2022	Konya, Turkey	67 kg	125	131	~~133~~	7	~~165~~	170	174	1st place, gold medalist(s)	305	3rd place, bronze medalist(s)
2025	Riyadh, Saudi Arabia	71 kg	146	~~150~~	~~150~~	4	181	186	190	1st place, gold medalist(s)	336	1st place, gold medalist(s)
World Junior Championships
2021	Tashkent, Uzbekistan	67 kg	129	~~132~~	133	4	165	168	~~172~~	3rd place, bronze medalist(s)	301	3rd place, bronze medalist(s)
2022	Heraklion, Greece	67 kg	130	~~134~~	136	3rd place, bronze medalist(s)	165	171	~~176~~	1st place, gold medalist(s)	307	2nd place, silver medalist(s)
European Junior and U23 Weightlifting Championships
2021	Rovaniemi, Finland	67 kg	129	132	~~135~~	3rd place, bronze medalist(s)	~~163~~	163	~~170~~	2nd place, silver medalist(s)	295	2nd place, silver medalist(s)
2022	Durrës, Albania	67 kg	128	~~131~~	131	3rd place, bronze medalist(s)	167	~~171~~	~~172~~	1st place, gold medalist(s)	298	2nd place, silver medalist(s)
2024	Raszyn, Poland	67 kg	135	140	144	1st place, gold medalist(s)	170	176	~~183~~	1st place, gold medalist(s)	320	1st place, gold medalist(s)
2025	Durrës, Albania	71 kg	146	~~150~~	150	2nd place, silver medalist(s)	185	190	~~191~~	1st place, gold medalist(s)	340	1st place, gold medalist(s)
Youth World Championships
2019	Las Vegas, United States	61 kg	108	~~111~~	~~111~~	3rd place, bronze medalist(s)	~~136~~	136	146	1st place, gold medalist(s)	254	2nd place, silver medalist(s)
European Youth Championships
2019	Eilat, Israel	61 kg	110	114	117	3rd place, bronze medalist(s)	140	146	152 EYR	1st place, gold medalist(s)	269 EYR	1st place, gold medalist(s)
