= Cansu Bektaş =

Turkish weightlifter (born 2003)

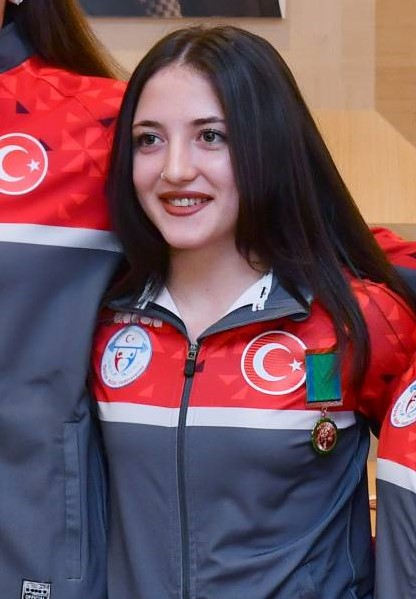

Personal information
- Born: 23 November 2003 (age 22) Giresun, Turkey
- Education: Selçuk University
- Height: 1.52 m (5 ft 0 in)
- Weight: 45 kg (99 lb)

Sport
- Country: Turkey
- Weight class: 45 kg
Medal record
Women's weightlifting
Representing Turkey
World Championships
Bronze medal – third place	2023 Riyadh	45 kg
European Championships
Gold medal – first place	2023 Yerevan	45 kg
Gold medal – first place	2024 Sofia	45 kg
Gold medal – first place	2025 Chișinău	45 kg
Silver medal – second place	2022 Tirana	45 kg
Islamic Solidarity Games
Silver medal – second place	2021 Konya	45 kg
European U23 Championships
Gold medal – first place	2024 Raszyn	45 kg
World Junior Championships
Gold medal – first place	2021 Tashkent	45 kg
Gold medal – first place	2023 Guadalajara	45 kg
Silver medal – second place	2022 Heraklion	45 kg
European Junior Championships
Gold medal – first place	2022 Durrës	45 kg
Gold medal – first place	2023 Bucharest	45 kg
Youth World Championships
Gold medal – first place	2019 Las Vegas	40 kg
European Youth Championships
Gold medal – first place	2019 Eilat	40 kg

Cansu Bektaş (born 23 November 2003) is a Turkish weightlifter competing in the 45 kg division. She is three-time European (2023, 2024 and 2025) champion and European Youth, Juniors and U23 record holder.

== Sport career ==
Bektaş won the silver medal in the women's 45 kg event at the 2022 European Weightlifting Championships held in Tirana, Albania. She took three silver medals at the 2021 Islamic Solidarity Games in Konya, Turkey. At the e 2023 European Weightlifting Championships in Yerevan, Armenia, she captured three gold medals in snatch, clean&jerk and total, breakinge European records for Juniors with 72 kg in snatch, 90 in clean&jerk and 162 kg in total. At the 2024 European Weightlifting Championships in Sofia, Bulgaria, she won the gold medal in the Snatch event with 75 kg, the silver medal in the Clean & Jerk event with 88 kg and the gold medal in total with 163 kg. Her total lift became the new European U23 record.

Cansu Bektaş became the European Champion for the third time at the 2025 European Weightlifting Championships in Chișinău, Moldova, winning the silver medal with 76 kg in the snatch, silver with 90 kg in the clean & jerk and gold with 166 kg in total.

Year	Competition	Venue	Weight	Snatch		Clean & Jerk		Total	
Year	Competition	Venue	Weight	(kg)	Rank	(kg)	Rank	(kg)	Rank
2019	Youth World Championships	Las Vegas, United States	40 kg	54	1st place, gold medalist(s)	63	1st place, gold medalist(s)	120	1st place, gold medalist(s)
2019	European Youth Championships	Eilat, Israel	40 kg	55; EYR	1st place, gold medalist(s)	67; EYR	1st place, gold medalist(s)	122; EYR	1st place, gold medalist(s)
2021	World Junior Championships	Tashkent, Uzbekistan	45 kg	70	1st place, gold medalist(s)	84	1st place, gold medalist(s)	154	1st place, gold medalist(s)
2022	World Junior Championships	Heraklion, Greece	45 kg	65	2nd place, silver medalist(s)	85	1st place, gold medalist(s)	150	2nd place, silver medalist(s)
2022	European Championships	Tirana, Albania	45 kg	68	4	85	2nd place, silver medalist(s)	153	2nd place, silver medalist(s)
2022	Islamic Solidarity Games	Konya, Turkey	45 kg	65	2nd place, silver medalist(s)	86	2nd place, silver medalist(s)	151	2nd place, silver medalist(s)
2022	European Junior & U23 Championships	Durrës, Albania	45 kg	70	1st place, gold medalist(s)	87	1st place, gold medalist(s)	157	1st place, gold medalist(s)
2023	European Championships	Yerevan, Armenia	45 kg	72; EJR	1st place, gold medalist(s)	90; EJR	1st place, gold medalist(s)	162; EJR	1st place, gold medalist(s)
2023	World Championships	Riyadh, Saudi Arabia	45 kg	75	3rd place, bronze medalist(s)	87	3rd place, bronze medalist(s)	162	3rd place, bronze medalist(s)
2023	World Junior Championships	Guadalajara, Spain	45 kg	73	1st place, gold medalist(s)	90	2nd place, silver medalist(s)	163	1st place, gold medalist(s)
2024	European Championships	Sofia, Bulgaria	45 kg	75	1st place, gold medalist(s)	88	2nd place, silver medalist(s)	163; EU23R	1st place, gold medalist(s)
2025	European Championships	Chișinău, Moldova	45 kg	76	2nd place, silver medalist(s)	90	2nd place, silver medalist(s)	166	1st place, gold medalist(s)

== Personal life ==
Cansu Bektaş, born on 23 November 2003, is a native of Giresun, northern Turkey. She attended Atatürk Anatolian High School in her hometown. She studies coaching in the Selçuk University Sports Sciences Faculty.
