= 2024 European Junior and U23 Weightlifting Championships =

International youth weightlifting competition

2024 European Junior & U23 Weightlifting Championships
- Venue: Centrum Sportu Raszyn
- Location: Raszyn, Poland
- Dates: 26 October–3 November
- Competitors: 449 from 39 nations

The 2024 European Junior and U23 Weightlifting Championships (51st in Junior and 15th in U23) took place in Raszyn, Poland from 26 October to 3 November 2024 .

== Team ranking ==
Rank	Men's Junior		Women's Junior		Men's Under-23		Women's Under-23	
Rank	Team	Points	Team	Points	Team	Points	Team	Points
1	Turkey	732	Ukraine	618	Armenia	625	Poland	546
2	Georgia	666	Poland	607	Georgia	621	Turkey	485
3	Armenia	589	Turkey	548	Ukraine	584	Ukraine	434
4	Ukraine	583	United Kingdom	445	Poland	489	Germany	344
5	Poland	576	Armenia	385	Bulgaria	287	United Kingdom	316
6	Bulgaria	349	Spain	374	Sweden	244	Armenia	307

== Medal table ==
=== Big ===
Ranking by Big (Total result) medals

* Host nation (Poland)

Rank	Nation	Gold	Silver	Bronze	Total
1	Armenia	13	5	4	22
2	Turkey	8	4	5	17
3	Ukraine	3	6	3	12
4	Italy	3	1	1	5
5	Georgia	2	7	4	13
6	Poland*	2	4	2	8
7	Germany	2	2	1	5
8	Moldova	2	1	2	5
9	Spain	1	2	2	5
10	Romania	1	0	3	4
11	Iceland	1	0	2	3
12	Malta	1	0	1	2
13	Greece	1	0	0	1
14	Great Britain	0	2	3	5
15	Azerbaijan	0	1	3	4
16	Bulgaria	0	1	2	3
17	Albania	0	1	0	1
17	France	0	1	0	1
17	Serbia	0	1	0	1
17	Sweden	0	1	0	1
21	Norway	0	0	1	1
21	Slovakia	0	0	1	1
Totals (22 entries)		40	40	40	120

=== Big and Small ===
Ranking by all medals: Big (Total result) and Small (Snatch and Clean & Jerk)

* Host nation (Poland)

Rank	Nation	Gold	Silver	Bronze	Total
1	Armenia	33	16	12	61
2	Turkey	22	19	12	53
3	Ukraine	11	15	8	34
4	Poland*	7	11	7	25
5	Italy	7	4	4	15
6	Georgia	6	20	12	38
7	Germany	6	5	3	14
8	Moldova	6	2	8	16
9	Romania	4	1	6	11
10	Spain	3	4	9	16
11	Iceland	3	1	4	8
12	Malta	3	1	1	5
13	Greece	3	1	0	4
14	Azerbaijan	2	4	6	12
15	Great Britain	1	4	8	13
16	Albania	1	2	0	3
16	France	1	2	0	3
18	Serbia	1	1	1	3
19	Bulgaria	0	3	8	11
20	Sweden	0	2	1	3
21	Slovakia	0	1	3	4
22	Norway	0	1	1	2
23	Austria	0	0	2	2
24	Denmark	0	0	1	1
24	Finland	0	0	1	1
24	Israel	0	0	1	1
24	Lithuania	0	0	1	1
Totals (27 entries)		120	120	120	360

== Juniors ==
=== Men ===
Event	Gold		Silver		Bronze	
55 kg
Snatch	Zhora Grigoryan (ARM)	103 kg	Ertuğrul Seçgin (TUR)	103 kg	Danu Secrieru (MDA)	102 kg
Clean & Jerk	Ramazan Efe Yılmaz (TUR)	131 kg	Zhora Grigoryan (ARM)	130 kg	Dzhan Zarkov (BUL)	127 kg
Total	Zhora Grigoryan (ARM)	233 kg	Ramazan Efe Yılmaz (TUR)	230 kg	Danu Secrieru (MDA)	228 kg
61 kg
Snatch	Rafik Minasyan (ARM)	119 kg	Giga Odikadze (GEO)	119 kg	Ion Badanev (MDA)	118 kg
Clean & Jerk	Ion Badanev (MDA)	147 kg	Burak Aykun (TUR)	145 kg	Rafik Minasyan (ARM)	145 kg
Total	Ion Badanev (MDA)	265 kg	Rafik Minasyan (ARM)	264 kg	Burak Aykun (TUR)	261 kg
67 kg
Snatch	Kaan Kahriman (TUR)	144 kg	Engin Kara (TUR)	128 kg	Maksym Berezhnyi (UKR)	124 kg
Clean & Jerk	Kaan Kahriman (TUR)	156 kg	Konstantinos Lampridis (GRE)	153 kg	Gasim Ismayilov (AZE)	153 kg
Total	Kaan Kahriman (TUR)	300 kg	Engin Kara (TUR)	278 kg	Gasim Ismayilov (AZE)	273 kg
73 kg
Snatch	Tiberiu Donose (ROU)	148 kg	Serhii Kolesnyk (UKR)	138 kg	Kilian Gallart (ESP)	137 kg
Clean & Jerk	Tiberiu Donose (ROU)	170 kg	Martin Poghosyan (ARM)	168 kg	Serhii Kolesnyk (UKR)	166 kg
Total	Tiberiu Donose (ROU)	318 kg	Serhii Kolesnyk (UKR)	304 kg	Martin Poghosyan (ARM)	298 kg
81 kg
Snatch	Ravin Almammadov (AZE)	151 kg	Levan Ochigava (GEO)	151 kg	Narek Mkrtchyan (ARM)	150 kg
Clean & Jerk	Narek Mkrtchyan (ARM)	191 kg	Ravin Almammadov (AZE)	187 kg	Levan Ochigava (GEO)	181 kg
Total	Narek Mkrtchyan (ARM)	341 kg	Ravin Almammadov (AZE)	338 kg	Levan Ochigava (GEO)	332 kg
89 kg
Snatch	Goga Jajvani (GEO)	156 kg	Valerik Movsisyan (ARM)	155 kg	Patryk Barański (POL)	154 kg
Clean & Jerk	Kerem Kurnaz (TUR)	190 kg	Goga Jajvani (GEO)	185 kg	Elias Simbürger (AUT)	185 kg
Total	Kerem Kurnaz (TUR)	342 kg	Goga Jajvani (GEO)	341 kg	Valerik Movsisyan (ARM)	339 kg
96 kg
Snatch	Ertjan Kofsha (ALB)	162 kg	Enes Çelik (TUR)	161 kg	Yanush Margulis (ISR)	157 kg
Clean & Jerk	Enes Çelik (TUR)	194 kg	Ertjan Kofsha (ALB)	192 kg	Darius Tătaru (ROU)	190 kg
Total	Enes Çelik (TUR)	355 kg	Ertjan Kofsha (ALB)	354 kg	Darius Tătaru (ROU)	332 kg
102 kg
Snatch	Danylo Chyniakov (UKR)	157 kg	Tanislav Angelov (BUL)	155 kg	Aleksandr Lazaryan (ARM)	154 kg
Clean & Jerk	Aleksandr Lazaryan (ARM)	193 kg	Tornike Lomtadze (GEO)	192 kg	Tanislav Angelov (BUL)	184 kg
Total	Aleksandr Lazaryan (ARM)	347 kg	Tornike Lomtadze (GEO)	340 kg	Tanislav Angelov (BUL)	339 kg
109 kg
Snatch	Muhammed Emin Burun (TUR)	165 kg	Gurami Vekua (GEO)	162 kg	Illia Kyselov (UKR)	156 kg
Clean & Jerk	Gurami Vekua (GEO)	204 kg	Muhammed Emin Burun (TUR)	204 kg	Andrii Borovskyi (UKR)	192 kg
Total	Muhammed Emin Burun (TUR)	369 kg	Gurami Vekua (GEO)	366 kg	Andrii Borovskyi (UKR)	346 kg
+109 kg
Snatch	Szymon Ziółkowski (POL)	171 kg	Taner Çağlar (TUR)	162 kg	Marek Gugała (POL)	159 kg
Clean & Jerk	Ashot Movsisyan (ARM)	201 kg	Irakli Vekua (GEO)	200 kg EYR	Szymon Ziółkowski (POL)	200 kg
Total	Szymon Ziółkowski (POL)	371 kg	Ashot Movsisyan (ARM)	359 kg	Taner Çağlar (TUR)	358 kg

=== Women ===
Event	Gold		Silver		Bronze	
45 kg
Snatch	Ezgi Kılıç (TUR)	74 kg	Kateryna Malashchuk (UKR)	68 kg	Boyana Kostadinova (BUL)	67 kg
Clean & Jerk	Ezgi Kılıç (TUR)	85 kg	Boyana Kostadinova (BUL)	82 kg	Yağmur Melek Şahin (TUR)	81 kg
Total	Ezgi Kılıç (TUR)	159 kg	Boyana Kostadinova (BUL)	149 kg EYR	Kateryna Malashchuk (UKR)	148 kg
49 kg
Snatch	Maria Stratoudaki (GRE)	73 kg	Nikole Roberts (GBR)	72 kg	Alina Popescu (MDA)	65 kg
Clean & Jerk	Maria Stratoudaki (GRE)	96 kg EYR	Kim Camilleri (MLT)	83 kg	Eleni Battistetti (ITA)	83 kg
Total	Maria Stratoudaki (GRE)	169 kg	Nikole Roberts (GBR)	153 kg	Kim Camilleri (MLT)	148 kg
55 kg
Snatch	Małgorzata Myjak (POL)	86 kg	Aleksandra Grigoryan (ARM)	85 kg	Merve İlden (TUR)	82 kg
Clean & Jerk	Aleksandra Grigoryan (ARM)	115 kg	Małgorzata Myjak (POL)	102 kg	Nicoleta Cojocaru (MDA)	101 kg
Total	Aleksandra Grigoryan (ARM)	200 kg	Małgorzata Myjak (POL)	188 kg	Merve İlden (TUR)	181 kg
59 kg
Snatch	Maelyn Michel (FRA)	90 kg	Greta de Riso (ITA)	88 kg	Laura García (ESP)	87 kg
Clean & Jerk	Greta de Riso (ITA)	110 kg	Laura García (ESP)	109 kg	María Olalla (ESP)	108 kg
Total	Greta de Riso (ITA)	198 kg	Maelyn Michel (FRA)	197 kg	Laura García (ESP)	196 kg
64 kg
Snatch	Tenishia Thornton (MLT)	89 kg	Tuğba Nur Koz (TUR)	88 kg	Lavinia Magistris (ITA)	87 kg
Clean & Jerk	Tenishia Thornton (MLT)	112 kg	Anca Grosu (ROU)	111 kg	Uxía Romero (ESP)	109 kg
Total	Tenishia Thornton (MLT)	201 kg	Uxía Romero (ESP)	194 kg	Anca Grosu (ROU)	193 kg
71 kg
Snatch	Monika Marach (POL)	105 kg	Martyna Dołęga (POL)	100 kg	Iryna Dombrovska (UKR)	95 kg
Clean & Jerk	Monika Marach (POL)	121 kg	Iryna Dombrovska (UKR)	115 kg	Medine Saime Balaban (TUR)	114 kg
Total	Monika Marach (POL)	226 kg	Martyna Dołęga (POL)	214 kg	Iryna Dombrovska (UKR)	210 kg
76 kg
Snatch	Alexandrina Ciubotaru (MDA)	102 kg	Isabella Brown (GBR)	101 kg	Anna Amroyan (ARM)	100 kg
Clean & Jerk	Anna Amroyan (ARM)	128 kg	Alexandrina Ciubotaru (MDA)	125 kg	Minni Hormavirta (FIN)	118 kg
Total	Anna Amroyan (ARM)	228 kg	Alexandrina Ciubotaru (MDA)	227 kg	Isabella Brown (GBR)	219 kg
81 kg
Snatch	Emma Poghosyan (ARM)	100 kg	Nana Khorava (GEO)	95 kg	Natia Gadelia (GEO)	94 kg
Clean & Jerk	Emma Poghosyan (ARM)	118 kg	Natia Gadelia (GEO)	117 kg	Nana Khorava (GEO)	114 kg
Total	Emma Poghosyan (ARM)	218 kg	Natia Gadelia (GEO)	211 kg	Nana Khorava (GEO)	209 kg
87 kg
Snatch	Mariam Murgvliani (GEO)	103 kg	Büşra Çan (TUR)	99 kg	Charlotte Absolom (GBR)	95 kg
Clean & Jerk	Mariam Murgvliani (GEO)	125 kg	Büşra Çan (TUR)	120 kg	Charlotte Absolom (GBR)	117 kg
Total	Mariam Murgvliani (GEO)	228 kg	Büşra Çan (TUR)	219 kg	Charlotte Absolom (GBR)	212 kg
+87 kg
Snatch	Julieta Avanesyan (ARM)	108 kg	Fatmagül Çevik (TUR)	107 kg	Aurelia Pedersen (DEN)	100 kg
Clean & Jerk	Hanna Kalashnyk (UKR)	133 kg	Julieta Avanesyan (ARM)	127 kg	Fatmagül Çevik (TUR)	122 kg
Total	Julieta Avanesyan (ARM)	235 kg	Hanna Kalashnyk (UKR)	230 kg	Fatmagül Çevik (TUR)	229 kg

== Under-23 ==
=== Men ===
Event	Gold		Silver		Bronze	
55 kg
Snatch	Harun Algül (TUR)	106 kg	Federico La Barbera (ITA)	103 kg	Iulian Betca (MDA)	102 kg
Clean & Jerk	Federico La Barbera (ITA)	130 kg	Bachuki Shamilishvili (GEO)	129 kg	Iulian Betca (MDA)	126 kg
Total	Federico La Barbera (ITA)	233 kg	Bachuki Shamilishvili (GEO)	229 kg	Iulian Betca (MDA)	228 kg
61 kg
Snatch	Garnik Cholakyan (ARM)	125 kg	Andrii Revko (UKR)	112 kg	Angel Rusev (BUL)	111 kg
Clean & Jerk	Garnik Cholakyan (ARM)	150 kg	Andrii Revko (UKR)	148 kg	Angel Rusev (BUL)	141 kg
Total	Garnik Cholakyan (ARM)	275 kg	Andrii Revko (UKR)	260 kg	Angel Rusev (BUL)	252 kg
67 kg
Snatch	Yusuf Fehmi Genç (TUR)	144 kg	Tehran Mammadov (AZE)	133 kg	Gurami Giorbelidze (GEO)	132 kg
Clean & Jerk	Yusuf Fehmi Genç (TUR)	176 kg	Gurami Giorbelidze (GEO)	162 kg	Fuad Hasanov (AZE)	156 kg
Total	Yusuf Fehmi Genç (TUR)	320 kg	Gurami Giorbelidze (GEO)	294 kg	Fuad Hasanov (AZE)	287 kg
73 kg
Snatch	Konrad Łazuga (POL)	142 kg	Kacper Urban (POL)	140 kg	Gor Sahakyan (ARM)	140 kg
Clean & Jerk	Gor Sahakyan (ARM)	180 kg	Konrad Łazuga (POL)	167 kg	Kacper Urban (POL)	167 kg
Total	Gor Sahakyan (ARM)	320 kg	Konrad Łazuga (POL)	309 kg	Kacper Urban (POL)	307 kg
81 kg
Snatch	Omar Javadov (AZE)	155 kg	Archil Malakmadze (GEO)	154 kg	Hmayak Misakyan (AUT)	153 kg
Clean & Jerk	Dmytro Kondratiuk (UKR)	190 kg	Karen Margaryan (ARM)	183 kg	Sebastián Cabala (SVK)	182 kg
Total	Archil Malakmadze (GEO)	335 kg	Dmytro Kondratiuk (UKR)	334 kg	Karen Margaryan (ARM)	333 kg
89 kg
Snatch	Suren Grigoryan (ARM)	157 kg	Maksym Dombrovskyi (UKR)	156 kg	Saba Asanidze (GEO)	155 kg
Clean & Jerk	Suren Grigoryan (ARM)	193 kg	Maksym Dombrovskyi (UKR)	192 kg	Mnatsakan Abrahamyan (ARM)	191 kg
Total	Suren Grigoryan (ARM)	350 kg	Maksym Dombrovskyi (UKR)	348 kg	Mnatsakan Abrahamyan (ARM)	343 kg
96 kg
Snatch	Raphael Friedrich (GER)	160 kg	Patryk Sawulski (POL)	160 kg	Zurab Mskhaladze (GEO)	157 kg
Clean & Jerk	Raphael Friedrich (GER)	196 kg	Zurab Mskhaladze (GEO)	195 kg	Patryk Sawulski (POL)	194 kg
Total	Raphael Friedrich (GER)	356 kg	Patryk Sawulski (POL)	354 kg	Zurab Mskhaladze (GEO)	352 kg
102 kg
Snatch	Tudor Bratu (MDA)	170 kg	Yann Thomasson (FRA)	155 kg	Luka Kashibadze (GEO)	151 kg
Clean & Jerk	Tudor Bratu (MDA)	210 kg	Erik Ludwig (GER)	196 kg	Luka Kashibadze (GEO)	191 kg
Total	Tudor Bratu (MDA)	380 kg	Erik Ludwig (GER)	346 kg	Luka Kashibadze (GEO)	342 kg
109 kg
Snatch	Garik Karapetyan (ARM)	182 kg	Ali Shukurlu (AZE)	173 kg	Vasil Marinov (BUL)	168 kg
Clean & Jerk	Garik Karapetyan (ARM)	220 kg	Zaza Lomtadze (GEO)	207 kg	Ali Shukurlu (AZE)	201 kg
Total	Garik Karapetyan (ARM)	402 kg	Zaza Lomtadze (GEO)	375 kg	Ali Shukurlu (AZE)	374 kg
+109 kg
Snatch	Bohdan Hoza (UKR)	181 kg	Ragnar Holme (NOR)	167 kg	Petros Petrosyan (ARM)	166 kg
Clean & Jerk	Petros Petrosyan (ARM)	218 kg	Ali Oflaz (TUR)	212 kg	Karolis Stonkus (LTU)	211 kg
Total	Petros Petrosyan (ARM)	384 kg	Bohdan Hoza (UKR)	383 kg	Ragnar Holme (NOR)	377 kg

=== Women ===
Event	Gold		Silver		Bronze	
45 kg
Snatch	Marta García (ESP)	76 kg	Cansu Bektaş (TUR)	75 kg	Gamze Altun (TUR)	70 kg
Clean & Jerk	Gamze Altun (TUR)	93 kg	Cansu Bektaş (TUR)	91 kg	Marta García (ESP)	89 kg
Total	Cansu Bektaş (TUR)	166 kg	Marta García (ESP)	165 kg	Gamze Altun (TUR)	163 kg
49 kg
Snatch	Cosmina Adriana Pană (ROU)	73 kg	Ruslana Kuzikova (UKR)	72 kg	Radmila Zagorac (SRB)	69 kg
Clean & Jerk	Radmila Zagorac (SRB)	92 kg	Ruslana Kuzikova (UKR)	90 kg	Cosmina Adriana Pană (ROU)	87 kg
Total	Ruslana Kuzikova (UKR)	162 kg	Radmila Zagorac (SRB)	161 kg	Cosmina Adriana Pană (ROU)	160 kg
55 kg
Snatch	Olha Ivzhenko (UKR)	88 kg	Burcu Alıcı (TUR)	85 kg	Cansel Özkan (TUR)	83 kg
Clean & Jerk	Olha Ivzhenko (UKR)	104 kg	Burcu Alıcı (TUR)	103 kg	Martina Bomben (ITA)	102 kg
Total	Olha Ivzhenko (UKR)	192 kg	Burcu Alıcı (TUR)	188 kg	Martina Bomben (ITA)	183 kg
59 kg
Snatch	Chiara Piccinno (ITA)	93 kg	Annika Pilz (GER)	85 kg	Marinela Moroşan (ROU)	80 kg
Clean & Jerk	Chiara Piccinno (ITA)	110 kg	Monika Szymanek (POL)	106 kg	Annika Pilz (GER)	106 kg
Total	Chiara Piccinno (ITA)	203 kg	Annika Pilz (GER)	191 kg	Monika Szymanek (POL)	186 kg
64 kg
Snatch	Svitlana Moskvina (UKR)	103 kg	Giulia Miserendino (ITA)	102 kg	Aysel Özkan (TUR)	97 kg
Clean & Jerk	Svitlana Moskvina (UKR)	120 kg	Wiktoria Wołk (POL)	118 kg	Naroa Arrasate (ESP)	118 kg
Total	Svitlana Moskvina (UKR)	223 kg	Giulia Miserendino (ITA)	218 kg	Naroa Arrasate (ESP)	213 kg
71 kg
Snatch	Eygló Fanndal Sturludóttir (ISL)	104 kg	Guðný Björk Stefánsdóttir (ISL)	96 kg	Jennifer Andersson (SWE)	95 kg
Clean & Jerk	Eygló Fanndal Sturludóttir (ISL)	133 kg	Jennifer Andersson (SWE)	116 kg	Stephanie Martín (ESP)	114 kg
Total	Eygló Fanndal Sturludóttir (ISL)	237 kg	Jennifer Andersson (SWE)	211 kg	Guðný Björk Stefánsdóttir (ISL)	210 kg
76 kg
Snatch	Irene Blanco (ESP)	93 kg	Amelie Hörner (GER)	91 kg	Madison Farley (GBR)	89 kg
Clean & Jerk	Madison Farley (GBR)	116 kg	Irene Blanco (ESP)	115 kg	Amelie Hörner (GER)	111 kg
Total	Irene Blanco (ESP)	208 kg	Madison Farley (GBR)	205 kg	Amelie Hörner (GER)	202 kg
81 kg
Snatch	Sara Yenigün (TUR)	97 kg	Milena Khachatryan (ARM)	96 kg	Funmi Morgan (GBR)	94 kg
Clean & Jerk	Sara Yenigün (TUR)	127 kg	Milena Khachatryan (ARM)	122 kg	Funmi Morgan (GBR)	113 kg
Total	Sara Yenigün (TUR)	224 kg	Milena Khachatryan (ARM)	218 kg	Funmi Morgan (GBR)	207 kg
87 kg
Snatch	Liana Gyurjyan (ARM)	100 kg	Lenka Žembová (SVK)	95 kg	Margarita Arakelyan (ARM)	93 kg
Clean & Jerk	Liana Gyurjyan (ARM)	130 kg	Margarita Arakelyan (ARM)	121 kg	Lenka Žembová (SVK)	113 kg
Total	Liana Gyurjyan (ARM)	230 kg	Margarita Arakelyan (ARM)	214 kg	Lenka Žembová (SVK)	208 kg
+87 kg
Snatch	Kiara Klug (GER)	108 kg	Meri Tumasyan (ARM)	98 kg	Erla Ágústsdóttir (ISL)	97 kg
Clean & Jerk	Kiara Klug (GER)	128 kg	Meri Tumasyan (ARM)	122 kg	Erla Ágústsdóttir (ISL)	116 kg
Total	Kiara Klug (GER)	236 kg	Meri Tumasyan (ARM)	220 kg	Erla Ágústsdóttir (ISL)	213 kg

== Participating nations ==
488 athletes from 39 nations.

- Albania (2)
- Armenia (30)
- Austria (9)
- Azerbaijan (11)
- Belgium (9)
- Bulgaria (26)
- Croatia (4)
- Czech Republic (15)
- Denmark (12)
- Estonia (1)
- Finland (15)
- France (8)
- Georgia (29)
- Germany (14)
- United Kingdom (14)
- Greece (3)
- Hungary (10)
- Iceland (4)
- Individual Neutral Athletes (26)
- Ireland (5)
- Israel (6)
- Italy (12)
- Kosovo (1)
- Latvia (6)
- Lithuania (11)
- Malta (3)
- Moldova (20)
- Netherlands (1)
- Norway (5)
- Poland (44)
- Portugal (1)
- Romania (18)
- Serbia (2)
- Slovakia (7)
- Slovenia (3)
- Spain (24)
- Sweden (9)
- Turkey (36)
- Ukraine (39)
