= Aleksandra Grigoryan =

Armenian weightlifter (born 2005)

Personal information
- Born: 1 August 2005 (age 20) Gyumri, Armenia

Sport
- Country: Armenia
- Sport: Weightlifting
- Weight class: 55 kg
Medal record
Women's weightlifting
Representing Armenia
World Championships
Bronze medal – third place	2024 Manama	55 kg
European Championships
Gold medal – first place	2024 Sofia	55 kg
Silver medal – second place	2025 Chișinău	55 kg
Silver medal – second place	2026 Batumi	58 kg
World Junior Championships
Gold medal – first place	2023 Guadalajara	55 kg
Bronze medal – third place	2024 León	55 kg
Bronze medal – third place	2025 Lima	55 kg
European Junior and U23 Championships
Gold medal – first place	2024 Durrës	55 kg
Gold medal – first place	2025 Durres	58 kg
Bronze medal – third place	2023 Bucharest	59 kg

Aleksandra Grigoryan (Armenian: Ալեքսանդրա Գրիգորյան; born 1 August 2005) is an Armenian weightlifter. She is a bronze medalist at the World Weightlifting Championships and two-time medalist at the European Weightlifting Championships.

== Career ==
Grigoryan won the European Youth Championship in the 49 kg weight category in 2022. In 2023, she made her debut at the European Senior Championship in Yerevan in the 55 kg weight category and took sixth place in the final. In September 2023, Grigoryan participated in the Senior World Championships in Saudi Arabia, where she finished in 7th place with a total of 190 kg in both exercises. In November 2023, she became the winner of the World Youth Championship in her category.

In February 2024, at the European Championships in Sofia, Grigoryan won a gold medal in the combined total of two exercises with a result of 196 kg. She was first in the clean and jerk (115 kg). In October 2024, she won gold at the European Youth Weightlifting Championships in Poland, collecting a total of 200 kg in the combined total of two exercises, as well as a minor gold medal with a result of 115 kg. On 8 December 2024, she won the bronze medal at the Senior World Championships in Manama, Bahrain, with a combined result of 205 kg (85+120). She also won the silver medal in the clean and jerk.

In 2025, at the European Championships in Chișinău, Grigoryan won a silver medal in the 55 kg weight category with a total of 202 kg. She also won the clean and jerk (117 kg). In October 2025, she participated in the European Youth and U23 Championships held in Durrës, Albania, and became the European champion in the 58 kg weight category, with a clean and jerk of 123 kg and a snatch of 91 kg.
