= List of European youth records in Olympic weightlifting =

This is the list of European youth records in Olympic weightlifting. They are the best results set in competition by athletes aged 13 to 17 throughout the entire calendar year of the performance. Records are maintained in each weight class for the snatch, clean and jerk, and the total for both by the European Weightlifting Federation (EWF).

== Current records ==
=== Men ===
Event	Record	Athlete	Nation	Date	Meet	Place	Age	Ref
55 kg
Snatch	106 kg	Christian Di Maria	Italy	21 August 2026	European Youth Championships	Prishtina, Kosovo	16 years, 168 days	
Clean & Jerk	128 kg	Christian Di Maria	Italy	21 August 2026	European Youth Championships	Prishtina, Kosovo	16 years, 168 days	
Total	234 kg	Christian Di Maria	Italy	21 August 2026	European Youth Championships	Prishtina, Kosovo	16 years, 168 days	
60 kg
Snatch	116 kg	Yiğit Erdoğan	Turkey	2 December 2025	Balkan Championships	Durrës, Albania	17 years, 138 days	
Clean & Jerk	147 kg	Ramazan Efe Yılmaz	Turkey	28 October 2025	European Junior Championships	Durrës, Albania	17 years, 47 days	
Total	258 kg	Yiğit Erdoğan	Turkey	2 December 2025	Balkan Championships	Durrës, Albania	17 years, 138 days	
65 kg
Snatch	124 kg	Dan Betca	Moldova	29 October 2025	European Junior Championships	Durrës, Albania	17 years, 254 days	
Clean & Jerk	154 kg	Dan Betca	Moldova	29 October 2025	European Junior Championships	Durrës, Albania	17 years, 254 days	
Total	278 kg	Dan Betca	Moldova	29 October 2025	European Junior Championships	Durrës, Albania	17 years, 254 days	
70 kg
Snatch	128 kg	Toprak Köleoğlu	Turkey	24 August 2026	European Youth Championships	Prishtina, Kosovo	16 years, 38 days	
Clean & Jerk	158 kg	EWF Standard						
Total	284 kg	EWF Standard						
75 kg
Snatch	135 kg	Antonino Mullisi	Albania	25 August 2026	European Youth Championships	Prishtina, Kosovo	17 years, 218 days	
Clean & Jerk	165 kg	Arsenii Kurochkin	Russia	25 August 2026	European Youth Championships	Prishtina, Kosovo	17 years, 217 days	
Total	297 kg	Arsenii Kurochkin	Russia	25 August 2026	European Youth Championships	Prishtina, Kosovo	17 years, 217 days	
85 kg
Snatch	143 kg	EWF Standard						
Clean & Jerk	175 kg	Lado Dzimtseishvili	Georgia	25 August 2026	European Youth Championships	Prishtina, Kosovo	17 years, 87 days	
Total	314 kg	Lado Dzimtseishvili	Georgia	25 August 2026	European Youth Championships	Prishtina, Kosovo	17 years, 87 days	
95 kg
Snatch	150 kg	Erik Guadamud	Spain	27 August 2026	European Youth Championships	Prishtina, Kosovo	16 years, 132 days	
Snatch	159 kg	Erik Guadamud	Spain	17 October 2026	European Junior Championships	Durrës, Albania	16 years, 183 days	
Snatch	163 kg	Erik Guadamud	Spain	4 November 2026	World Championships	Ningbo, China	16 years, 201 days	
Clean & Jerk	190 kg	Erik Guadamud	Spain	27 August 2026	European Youth Championships	Prishtina, Kosovo	16 years, 132 days	
Total	340 kg	Erik Guadamud	Spain	27 August 2026	European Youth Championships	Prishtina, Kosovo	16 years, 132 days	
Total	343 kg	Erik Guadamud	Spain	4 November 2026	World Championships	Ningbo, China	16 years, 201 days	
+95 kg
Snatch	157 kg	Kacper Piech	Poland	27 August 2026	European Youth Championships	Prishtina, Kosovo	17 years, 179 days	
Clean & Jerk	195 kg	Nikoloz Kurtanidze	Georgia	27 August 2026	European Youth Championships	Prishtina, Kosovo	17 years, 157 days	
Total	347 kg	EWF Standard						

=== Women ===
Event	Record	Athlete	Nation	Date	Meet	Place	Age	Ref
45 kg
Snatch	66 kg	Asel Şenel	Turkey	20 August 2026	European Youth Championships	Prishtina, Kosovo	14 years, 49 days	
Clean & Jerk	78 kg	EWF Standard						
Total	144 kg	EWF Standard						
49 kg
Snatch	73 kg	Maia Andrei	Romania	20 August 2026	European Youth Championships	Prishtina, Kosovo	15 years, 308 days	
Clean & Jerk	91 kg	Maia Andrei	Romania	20 August 2026	European Youth Championships	Prishtina, Kosovo	15 years, 308 days	
Total	164 kg	Maia Andrei	Romania	20 August 2026	European Youth Championships	Prishtina, Kosovo	15 years, 308 days	
53 kg
Snatch	84 kg	Alexia Șipoș	Romania	22 August 2026	European Youth Championships	Prishtina, Kosovo	17 years, 188 days	
Clean & Jerk	101 kg	Maria Stratoudaki	Greece	28 October 2025	European Junior Championships	Durrës, Albania	17 years, 145 days	
Total	185 kg	Alexia Șipoș	Romania	22 August 2026	European Youth Championships	Prishtina, Kosovo	17 years, 188 days	
57 kg
Snatch	87 kg	Nicoleta Cojocaru	Moldova	23 August 2026	European Youth Championships	Prishtina, Kosovo		
Clean & Jerk	108 kg	Nicoleta Cojocaru	Moldova	23 August 2026	European Youth Championships	Prishtina, Kosovo		
Total	195 kg	Nicoleta Cojocaru	Moldova	23 August 2026	European Youth Championships	Prishtina, Kosovo		
61 kg
Snatch	89 kg	EWF Standard						
Snatch	90 kg	Nicoleta Cojocaru	Moldova	15 October 2026	European Junior Championships	Durrës, Albania		
Clean & Jerk	110 kg	Uladzislava Lavar	Belarus	24 August 2026	European Youth Championships	Prishtina, Kosovo	16 years, 290 days	
Clean & Jerk	111 kg	Nicoleta Cojocaru	Moldova	15 October 2026	European Junior Championships	Durrës, Albania		
Total	195 kg	EWF Standard						
Total	201 kg	Nicoleta Cojocaru	Moldova	15 October 2026	European Junior Championships	Durrës, Albania		
69 kg
Snatch	92 kg	EWF Standard						
Snatch	103 kg	Emily Ibanez	Kosovo	16 October 2026	European Junior Championships	Durrës, Albania	15 years, 293 days	
Snatch	106 kg	Emily Ibanez	Kosovo	3 November 2026	World Championships	Ningbo, China	15 years, 311 days	
Clean & Jerk	114 kg	EWF Standard						
Clean & Jerk	128 kg	Emily Ibanez	Kosovo	16 October 2026	European Junior Championships	Durrës, Albania	15 years, 293 days	
Clean & Jerk	134 kg	Emily Ibanez	Kosovo	3 November 2026	World Championships	Ningbo, China	15 years, 311 days	
Total	205 kg	EWF Standard						
Total	231 kg	Emily Ibanez	Kosovo	16 October 2026	European Junior Championships	Durrës, Albania	15 years, 293 days	
Total	240 kg	Emily Ibanez	Kosovo	3 November 2026	World Championships	Ningbo, China	15 years, 311 days	
77 kg
Snatch	104 kg	Varvara Kuzminova	AIN	29 July 2025	European Youth Championships	Madrid, Spain	17 years, 21 days	
Clean & Jerk	124 kg	Minni Hormavirta	Finland	29 July 2025	European Youth Championships	Madrid, Spain	16 years, 324 days	
Total	226 kg	Varvara Kuzminova	AIN	29 July 2025	European Youth Championships	Madrid, Spain	17 years, 21 days	
+77 kg
Snatch	104 kg	EWF Standard						
Clean & Jerk	129 kg	EWF Standard						
Total	230 kg	EWF Standard						
Total	231 kg	Sara Dal Bò	Italy	18 October 2026	European Junior Championships	Durrës, Albania	17 years, 144 days	

== Historical records ==
=== Men (2025–2026) ===
Event	Record	Athlete	Nation	Date	Meet	Place	Age	Ref
56 kg
Snatch	108 kg	Christian Di Maria	Italy	5 July 2026	World Youth Championships	Cali, Colombia	16 years, 121 days	
Clean & Jerk	132 kg	EWF Standard						
Total	238 kg	Christian Di Maria	Italy	5 July 2026	World Youth Championships	Cali, Colombia	16 years, 121 days	
71 kg
Snatch	130 kg	EWF Standard						
Clean & Jerk	161 kg	Arsenii Kurochkin	AIN	27 July 2025	European Youth Championships	Madrid, Spain	16 years, 188 days	
Total	290 kg	EWF Standard						
79 kg
Snatch	139 kg	Yurii Klymkovych	Ukraine	30 July 2025	European Youth Championships	Madrid, Spain	17 years, 63 days	
Clean & Jerk	166 kg	EWF Standard						
Total	302 kg	Yiğithan Eroğlu	Turkey	9 July 2026	World Youth Championships	Cali, Colombia	16 years, 34 days	
88 kg
Snatch	156 kg	Erik Guadamud	Spain	10 July 2026	World Youth Championships	Cali, Colombia	16 years, 84 days	
Clean & Jerk	188 kg	Erik Guadamud	Spain	10 July 2026	World Youth Championships	Cali, Colombia	16 years, 84 days	
Total	344 kg	Erik Guadamud	Spain	10 July 2026	World Youth Championships	Cali, Colombia	16 years, 84 days	
94 kg
Snatch	150 kg	Grigor Ghazaryan	Armenia	2 November 2025	European Junior Championships	Durrës, Albania	17 years, 222 days	
Clean & Jerk	190 kg	Grigor Ghazaryan	Armenia	31 July 2025	European Youth Championships	Madrid, Spain	17 years, 128 days	
Total	338 kg	Grigor Ghazaryan	Armenia	31 July 2025	European Youth Championships	Madrid, Spain	17 years, 128 days	
+94 kg
Snatch	160 kg	Harutyun Hovhannisyan	Armenia	31 July 2025	European Youth Championships	Madrid, Spain	17 years, 205 days	
Clean & Jerk	194 kg	EWF Standard						
Total	347 kg	EWF Standard						

=== Men (2018–2025) ===
Event	Record	Athlete	Nation	Date	Meet	Place	Age	Ref
49 kg
Snatch	99 kg	Christian Di Maria	Italy	30 April 2025	World Youth Championships	Lima, Peru	15 years, 55 days	
Clean & Jerk	115 kg	Christian Di Maria	Italy	30 April 2025	World Youth Championships	Lima, Peru	15 years, 55 days	
Total	214 kg	Christian Di Maria	Italy	30 April 2025	World Youth Championships	Lima, Peru	15 years, 55 days	
55 kg
Snatch	110 kg	Danu Secrieru	Moldova	14 April 2025	European Championships	Chișinău, Moldova	17 years, 49 days	
Clean & Jerk	140 kg	EWF Standard						
Total	248 kg	EWF Standard						
61 kg
Snatch	123 kg	Kaan Kahriman	Turkey	6 October 2021	Youth World Championships	Jeddah, Saudi Arabia	17 years, 24 days	
Clean & Jerk	153 kg	Ramazan Efe Yılmaz	Turkey	1 May 2025	World Youth Championships	Lima, Peru	16 years, 232 days	
Total	269 kg	Doğan Dönen	Turkey	2 June 2019	Junior World Championships	Suva, Fiji	16 years, 174 days	
67 kg
Snatch	131 kg	Seryozha Barseghyan	Armenia	5 July 2023	European Youth Championships	Chișinău, Moldova	16 years, 143 days	
Clean & Jerk	161 kg	Alaaddin Sayın	Turkey	13 August 2022	European Youth Championships	Raszyn, Poland	17 years, 186 days	
Total	284 kg	Ravin Almammadov	Azerbaijan	13 August 2022	European Youth Championships	Raszyn, Poland	16 years, 179 days	
73 kg
Snatch	139 kg	Tiberiu Donose	Romania	19 October 2022	European Junior Championships	Durrës, Albania	17 years, 160 days	
Clean & Jerk	167 kg	Ravin Almammadov	Azerbaijan	28 March 2023	Youth World Championships	Durrës, Albania	17 years, 41 days	
Total	303 kg	Ravin Almammadov	Azerbaijan	28 March 2023	Youth World Championships	Durrës, Albania	17 years, 41 days	
81 kg
Snatch	166 kg	Karlos Nasar	Bulgaria	12 December 2021	World Championships	Tashkent, Uzbekistan	17 years, 214 days	
Clean & Jerk	208 kg	Karlos Nasar	Bulgaria	12 December 2021	World Championships	Tashkent, Uzbekistan	17 years, 214 days	
Total	374 kg	Karlos Nasar	Bulgaria	12 December 2021	World Championships	Tashkent, Uzbekistan	17 years, 214 days	
89 kg
Snatch	165 kg	Siarhei Sharankou	Belarus	13 December 2019	European Youth Championships	Eilat, Israel	17 years, 181 days	
Clean & Jerk	192 kg	Siarhei Sharankou	Belarus	13 December 2019	European Youth Championships	Eilat, Israel	17 years, 181 days	
Total	357 kg	Siarhei Sharankou	Belarus	13 December 2019	European Youth Championships	Eilat, Israel	17 years, 181 days	
96 kg
Snatch	162 kg	Artur Babayan	Russia	13 December 2019	European Youth Championships	Eilat, Israel	17 years, 157 days	
Clean & Jerk	194 kg	Artur Babayan	Russia	25 October 2019	European Junior Championships	Bucharest, Romania	17 years, 108 days	
Total	354 kg	Artur Babayan	Russia	25 October 2019	European Junior Championships	Bucharest, Romania	17 years, 108 days	
102 kg
Snatch	176 kg	Bohdan Hoza	Ukraine	14 December 2019	European Youth Championships	Eilat, Israel	17 years, 336 days	
Clean & Jerk	201 kg	Bohdan Hoza	Ukraine	14 December 2019	European Youth Championships	Eilat, Israel	17 years, 336 days	
Total	377 kg	Bohdan Hoza	Ukraine	14 December 2019	European Youth Championships	Eilat, Israel	17 years, 336 days	
+102 kg
Snatch	162 kg	EWF Standard						
Clean & Jerk	200 kg	Irakli Vekua	Georgia	3 November 2024	European Junior Championships	Raszyn, Poland	17 years, 246 days	
Total	357 kg	Timur Mariev	Russia	14 December 2019	European Youth Championships	Eilat, Israel	16 years, 175 days	

=== Men (1998–2018) ===
Event	Record	Athlete	Nation	Date	Meet	Place	Age	Ref
50 kg
Snatch	93 kg	Florin Croitoru	Romania	18 May 2010	Youth Olympic Games Qualification	Valencia, Spain	16 years, 266 days	
Clean & Jerk	117 kg	Valentin Iancu	Romania	23 September 2017	European Youth Championships	Pristina, Kosovo	17 years, 250 days	
Total	207 kg	Florin Croitoru	Romania	18 May 2010	Youth Olympic Games Qualification	Valencia, Spain	16 years, 266 days	
56 kg
Snatch	122 kg	Valentin Hristov	Azerbaijan	5 November 2011	World Championships	Paris, France	17 years, 220 days	
Clean & Jerk	154 kg	Valentin Hristov	Azerbaijan	5 November 2011	World Championships	Paris, France	17 years, 220 days	
Total	276 kg	Valentin Hristov	Azerbaijan	5 November 2011	World Championships	Paris, France	17 years, 220 days	
62 kg
Snatch	127 kg	Zulfat Garaev	Russia	25 September 2017	European Youth Championships	Pristina, Kosovo	17 years, 256 days	
Clean & Jerk	153 kg	Antoniu Buci	Romania	9 October 2007		Tenerife, Spain	17 years, 261 days	
Total	278 kg	Stilyan Grozdev	Bulgaria	4 December 2016	European Junior Championships	Eilat, Israel	17 years, 130 days	
69 kg
Snatch	147 kg	Taner Sağır	Turkey	31 May 2002	Junior World Championships	Havířov, Czech Republic	17 years, 79 days	
Clean & Jerk								
Total	322 kg	Taner Sağır	Turkey	31 May 2002	Junior World Championships	Havířov, Czech Republic	17 years, 79 days	
77 kg
Snatch								
Clean & Jerk								
Total								
85 kg
Snatch								
Clean & Jerk								
Total								
94 kg
Snatch	174 kg	Aleksey Kosov	Russia	17 December 2011	President's Cup	Belgorod, Russia	17 years, 141 days	
Clean & Jerk	218 kg	Szymon Kołecki	Poland	14 November 1998	World Championships	Lahti, Finland	17 years, 33 days	
Total	385 kg	Szymon Kołecki	Poland	14 November 1998	World Championships	Lahti, Finland	17 years, 33 days	
+94 kg
Snatch	184 kg	Simon Martirosyan	Armenia	28 November 2014	European Junior Championships	Limassol, Cyprus	17 years, 284 days	
Clean & Jerk	221 kg	Simon Martirosyan	Armenia	23 August 2014	Youth Olympic Games	Nanjing, China	17 years, 187 days	
Total	397 kg	Simon Martirosyan	Armenia	3 May 2014	European Youth Championships	Ciechanów, Poland	17 years, 75 days	

=== Women (2025–2026) ===
Event	Record	Athlete	Nation	Date	Meet	Place	Age	Ref
44 kg
Snatch	66 kg	Asel Şenel	Turkey	5 July 2026	World Youth Championships	Cali, Colombia	14 years, 3 days	
Clean & Jerk	78 kg	EWF Standard						
Total	144 kg	EWF Standard						
48 kg
Snatch	76 kg	Kateryna Malashchuk	Ukraine	24 July 2025	European Youth Championships	Madrid, Spain	17 years, 118 days	
Clean & Jerk	94 kg	Kateryna Malashchuk	Ukraine	28 October 2025	European Junior Championships	Durrës, Albania	17 years, 214 days	
Total	170 kg	Kateryna Malashchuk	Ukraine	28 October 2025	European Junior Championships	Durrës, Albania	17 years, 214 days	
58 kg
Snatch	91 kg	Nicoleta Cojocaru	Moldova	3 May 2026	World Junior Championships	Ismailia, Egypt		
Clean & Jerk	114 kg	Nicoleta Cojocaru	Moldova	7 July 2026	World Youth Championships	Cali, Colombia		
Total	202 kg	Nicoleta Cojocaru	Moldova	7 July 2026	World Youth Championships	Cali, Colombia		
63 kg
Snatch	98 kg	Enkileda Carja	Albania	31 October 2025	European Junior Championships	Durrës, Albania	17 years, 281 days	
Clean & Jerk	118 kg	Enkileda Carja	Albania	31 October 2025	European Junior Championships	Durrës, Albania	17 years, 281 days	
Total	216 kg	Enkileda Carja	Albania	31 October 2025	European Junior Championships	Durrës, Albania	17 years, 281 days	

=== Women (2018–2025) ===
Event	Record	Athlete	Nation	Date	Meet	Place	Age	Ref
40 kg
Snatch	57 kg	Ecrin Naz Şahin	Turkey	30 April 2025	World Youth Championships	Lima, Peru	13 years, 42 days	
Clean & Jerk	71 kg	Yağmur Melek Şahin	Turkey	5 July 2023	European Youth Championships	Chișinău, Moldova	16 years, 190 days	
Total	127 kg	Yağmur Melek Şahin	Turkey	5 July 2023	European Youth Championships	Chișinău, Moldova	16 years, 190 days	
45 kg
Snatch	69 kg	Gabriela Danilov	Moldova	13 April 2025	European Championships	Chișinău, Moldova	15 years, 329 days	
Clean & Jerk	85 kg	Oliwia Drzazga	Poland	6 October 2021	Youth World Championships	Jeddah, Saudi Arabia	16 years, 142 days	
Total	150 kg	Gabriela Danilov	Moldova	13 April 2025	European Championships	Chișinău, Moldova	15 years, 329 days	
49 kg
Snatch	83 kg	Nina Sterckx	Belgium	18 October 2019	European Junior Championships	Bucharest, Romania	17 years, 84 days	
Clean & Jerk	96 kg	Maria Stratoudaki	Greece	26 October 2024	European Junior Championships	Raszyn, Poland	16 years, 143 days	
Total	176 kg	Nina Sterckx	Belgium	18 October 2019	European Junior Championships	Bucharest, Romania	17 years, 84 days	
55 kg
Snatch	88 kg	Nina Sterckx	Belgium	10 December 2019	European Youth Championships	Eilat, Israel	17 years, 137 days	
Clean & Jerk	108 kg	Andreea Cotruță	Romania	10 December 2019	European Youth Championships	Eilat, Israel	15 years, 312 days	
Total	194 kg	Andreea Cotruță	Romania	10 December 2019	European Youth Championships	Eilat, Israel	15 years, 312 days	
59 kg
Snatch	89 kg	Greta De Riso	Italy	7 July 2023	European Youth Championships	Chișinău, Moldova	16 years, 192 days	
Clean & Jerk	109 kg	Greta De Riso	Italy	28 July 2023	European Junior Championships	Bucharest, Romania	16 years, 213 days	
Total	197 kg	Greta De Riso	Italy	28 July 2023	European Junior Championships	Bucharest, Romania	16 years, 213 days	
64 kg
Snatch	98 kg	Carja Enkileda	Albania	2 May 2025	World Youth Championships	Lima, Peru	17 years, 99 days	
Clean & Jerk	115 kg	Carja Enkileda	Albania	2 May 2025	World Youth Championships	Lima, Peru	17 years, 99 days	
Total	213 kg	Carja Enkileda	Albania	2 May 2025	World Youth Championships	Lima, Peru	17 years, 99 days	
71 kg
Snatch	103 kg	Zarina Gusalova	Russia	9 October 2021	Youth World Championships	Jeddah, Saudi Arabia	17 years, 273 days	
Clean & Jerk	123 kg	Zarina Gusalova	Russia	9 October 2021	Youth World Championships	Jeddah, Saudi Arabia	17 years, 273 days	
Total	226 kg	Zarina Gusalova	Russia	9 October 2021	Youth World Championships	Jeddah, Saudi Arabia	17 years, 273 days	
76 kg
Snatch	108 kg	Varvara Kuzminova	AIN	3 May 2025	World Youth Championships	Lima, Peru	16 years, 299 days	
Clean & Jerk	130 kg	Dilara Narin	Turkey	23 October 2019	European Junior Championships	Bucharest, Romania	17 years, 220 days	
Total	235 kg	Varvara Kuzminova	AIN	3 May 2025	World Youth Championships	Lima, Peru	16 years, 299 days	
81 kg
Snatch	103 kg	Mariam Murgvliani	Georgia	9 July 2023	European Youth Championships	Chișinău, Moldova	16 years, 216 days	
Clean & Jerk	129 kg	Emma Poghosyan	Armenia	9 July 2023	European Youth Championships	Chișinău, Moldova	16 years, 317 days	
Total	229 kg	EWF Standard						
+81 kg
Snatch	105 kg	Tuana Süren	Turkey	9 July 2023	European Youth Championships	Chișinău, Moldova	17 years, 69 days	
Snatch	106 kg	Tuana Süren	Turkey	2 August 2023	European Junior Championships	Bucharest, Romania	17 years, 93 days	
Clean & Jerk	130 kg	Tuana Süren	Turkey	9 July 2023	European Youth Championships	Chișinău, Moldova	17 years, 69 days	
Clean & Jerk	131 kg	Tuana Süren	Turkey	23 April 2023	European Championships	Yerevan, Armenia	16 years, 357 days	
Clean & Jerk	133 kg	Tuana Süren	Turkey	2 August 2023	European Junior Championships	Bucharest, Romania	17 years, 93 days	
Clean & Jerk	137 kg	Tuana Süren	Turkey	16 September 2023	World Championships	Riyadh, Saudi Arabia	17 years, 138 days	
Total	235 kg	Tuana Süren	Turkey	9 July 2023	European Youth Championships	Chișinău, Moldova	17 years, 69 days	
Total	239 kg	Tuana Süren	Turkey	2 August 2023	European Junior Championships	Bucharest, Romania	17 years, 93 days	
Total	243 kg	Tuana Süren	Turkey	16 September 2023	World Championships	Riyadh, Saudi Arabia	17 years, 138 days	

=== Women (1998–2018) ===
Event	Record	Athlete	Nation	Date	Meet	Place	Age	Ref
44 kg
Snatch	77 kg	Şaziye Okur	Turkey	8 September 2009	European Youth Championships	Eilat, Israel	17 years, 197 days	
Clean & Jerk	92 kg							
Total	169 kg	Şaziye Okur	Turkey	8 September 2009	European Youth Championships	Eilat, Israel	17 years, 197 days	
48 kg
Snatch								
Clean & Jerk								
Total								
53 kg
Snatch								
Clean & Jerk								
Total								
58 kg
Snatch								
Clean & Jerk								
Total								
63 kg
Snatch	107 kg	Viktoria Savenko	Russia	21 May 2005	World Junior Championships	Busan, South Korea	16 years, 358 days	
Clean & Jerk	128 kg	Viktoria Savenko	Russia	21 May 2005	World Junior Championships	Busan, South Korea	16 years, 358 days	
Total	235 kg	Viktoria Savenko	Russia	21 May 2005	World Junior Championships	Busan, South Korea	16 years, 358 days	
69 kg
Snatch	117 kg	Zarema Kasayeva	Russia	19 August 2004	Olympic Games	Athens, Greece	17 years, 176 days	
Clean & Jerk	145 kg	Zarema Kasayeva	Russia	19 August 2004	Olympic Games	Athens, Greece	17 years, 176 days	
Total	262 kg	Zarema Kasayeva	Russia	19 August 2004	Olympic Games	Athens, Greece	17 years, 176 days	
+69 kg
Snatch	120 kg	Tatiana Kashirina	Russia	20 September 2008		Durrës, Albania	17 years, 240 days	
Clean & Jerk	150 kg	Tatiana Kashirina	Russia	20 September 2008		Durrës, Albania	17 years, 240 days	
Total	270 kg	Tatiana Kashirina	Russia	20 September 2008		Durrës, Albania	17 years, 240 days	
