= Laura Hughes (weightlifter) =

Welsh weightlifter (born 1993)

Personal information
- Full name: Laura Bethany Hughes
- Nationality: Welsh
- Born: 24 March 1993 (age 33)

Sport
- Sport: Weightlifting
Medal record
Women's weightlifting
Representing Wales
Commonwealth Games
Bronze medal – third place	2018 Gold Coast	75 kg
Bronze medal – third place	2026 Glasgow	77 kg
Commonwealth Championships
Gold medal – first place	2017 Gold Coast	75 kg

Laura Bethany Hughes (born 24 March 1993) is a Welsh weightlifter. She was the 2017 Commonwealth champion at 75 kg. She competed in the women's 75 kg event at the 2018 Commonwealth Games, winning the bronze medal. Not selected for the 2022 Games at 76 kg, she returned to the Commonwealth Games in 2026, winning bronze again in the 77 kg event.
