= Eygló Fanndal Sturludóttir =

Icelandic weightlifter (born 2001)

Personal information
- Born: 25 June 2001 (age 25) Reykjavík, Iceland
- Home town: Kópavogur, Iceland
- Height: 1.69 m (5 ft 7 in)

Sport
- Country: Iceland
- Sport: Weightlifting
- Weight class: -71 kg
- Club: Lyftingafélag Reykjavíkur
- Coached by: Ingi Gunnar Ólafsson
Medal record
Women's weightlifting
Representing Iceland
European Championships
Gold medal – first place	2025 Chișinău	71 kg
European Junior & U23 Championships
Gold medal – first place	2022 Durrës	71 kg
Gold medal – first place	2024 Raszyn	71 kg

Eygló Fanndal Sturludóttir (born 25 June 2001) is an Icelandic weightlifter competing in the -71 kg weight category. She is the 2025 European Champion in -71 kg category. She has won the U23 European championship twice, in 2022 and 2024. She currently holds the Nordic senior record in the snatch 109 kg, the c&j 135 kg and the total at 244 kg in the women's -71 kg category. She was named the 2025 Icelandic Sportsperson of the Year.

== Career ==
Eygló began weightlifting in 2018 after having trained in artistic gymnastics from a young age and a short career in crossfit. She lifted 54 kg in the snatch and 70 kg in the clean and jerk during her first competition. She competed in the Nordic Junior Championships in 2019 and 2020 but first major international competition was the European Junior Championship in 2021 where she placed 6th in the -71 kg category with 89 kg snatch and 108 kg clean and jerk. That year, she also competed in her first World Championship in weightlifting in the -71kg category in Tashkent where she placed 20th with a 92 kg snatch and a 110 kg clean and jerk setting Nordic junior records in the -71 kg category.

In 2022 she competed for the first time at the Senior European Championships where she placed 9th with a 205 kg total in the -71 kg category. Later that year, she became the first Icelander to win a continental championship in any age or weight category in weightlifting when she lifted 97 kg in the snatch and 120 kg in the clean and jerk. At the 2022 World Championships in Bogotá, which was the first qualifying tournament for the 2024 Paris Summer Olympics, Eygló lifted a 213 kg total for 19th place.

In the year 2023, she participated in four Olympic qualifiers, increasing her personal best in every competition. The first was the 2023 European Weightlifting Championships in Yerevan, where she placed 6th in the -71 kg category with a 217 kg total. Next was the 2023 IWF Grand Prix I in Havana, where she placed 7th with a 220 kg total. The 2023 IWF World Weightlifting Championships took place in Riyadh, where Eygló lifted a 225 kg in the total for 17th place. The year ended with the IWF Grand Prix II in Doha, where she placed 11th with yet another improvement: a 104 kg in the snatch and 127 kg clean and jerk.

In 2024 she competed at the European Weightlifting Championships, placing 4th with 105 kg snatch, which set a new Nordic senior record and a 125 kg in the clean and jerk. In the final 2024 Paris Olympic qualifying competition, the IWF World Cup in Phuket, Eygló lifted 106 kg in the snatch, improving her Nordic Senior record by 1 kg, and achieved a 236 kg total-a new Nordic senior record previously held by former two-time European Champion Patricia Strenius of Sweden. This result earned her the 11th place at the IWF World Cup and 12th place in the final ranking for the 2024 Paris Olympics, where only the top 10 were guaranteed a spot. Iceland applied for a universality place for Eygló, but since France used their host nation spot in the -71kg category for Marie Fague, no universality athlete was included in that weight class.

Eygló competed in Meissen at the 2024 Pokal der Blauen Schwerter, achieving a respectable 236 kg total and a 3 kg improvement in the clean and jerk, finishing in fourth place. She became 2024 Nordic Senior Champion in the -71 kg category and earned the highest points among all female competitors across all weight categories after lifting 234 kg total in Runavík. Eygló also claimed the 2024 European U23 Weightlifting Championship title in the -71 kg category in Raszyn where she lifted a 237 kg in the total and, improving her own Nordic senior record by 1 kg. She was awarded the prize for Best Female Athlete across all weight categories, scoring 625.15 Robi points

In December 2024 Eygló ended up in 4th place at the 2024 World Weightlifting Championships in Manama, Bahrain. Lifting yet another personal best in the snatch 107 kg, 132 kg in the clean and jerk and a new personal best total of 239 kg.

At the 2025 European Weightlifting Championships she won gold in the -71 kg category with a 244 kg total, she took silver in snatch with 109 kg and gold in the clean and jerk with 135 kg. In doing so she became the first Icelander to win a medal at a senior continental championship

For her achievements, she was named the 2025 Icelandic Sportsperson of the Year.

== Personal life ==
Eygló was born in Iceland and studies medicine at the University of Iceland.

She represents the weightlifting club Lyftingafélag Reykjavíkur (LFR), which operates out of Crossfit Reykjavík, a gym partially owned by Icelandic crossfit star Anníe Mist Þórisdóttir, whom Eygló has mentioned as a positive influence on her weightlifting career.

She was voted Reykjavík's Sportswoman of 2024 in December 2024.

== Achievements ==
Year	Venue	Weight	Snatch (kg)				Clean & Jerk (kg)				Total	Rank
Year	Venue	Weight	1	2	3	Rank	1	2	3	Rank	Total	Rank
World Championships
2021	Tashkent, Uzbekistan	71 kg	84	88	92	13	104	108	110	21	202	20
2022	Bogotá, Colombia	71 kg	90	94	~~98~~	25	115	119	~~123~~	19	213	19
2023	Riyadh, Saudi Arabia	71 kg	95	99	102	16	116	120	123	21	225	17
2024	Manama, Bahrain	71 kg	101	104	107	5	129	132	~~134~~	4	239	4
IWF World Cup
2024	Phuket, Thailand	71 kg	103	106	~~108~~	10	130	~~134~~	~~134~~	10	236	11
European Championships
2022	Tirana, Albania	71 kg	~~89~~	89	~~94~~	10	112	116	~~120~~	5	205	9
2023	Yerevan, Armenia	71 kg	93	96	~~99~~	8	116	119	121	6	217	6
2024	Sofia, Bulgaria	71 kg	99	102	105	4	125	~~129~~	~~129~~	5	230	4
2025	Chișinău, Moldova	71 kg	103	106	109	2nd place, silver medalist(s)	129	133	135	1st place, gold medalist(s)	244	1st place, gold medalist(s)
