= Anna Amroyan =

Armenian weightlifter

Personal information
- Born: 5 June 2006 (age 20) Gyumri, Armenia
- Weight: 76 kg (168 lb)

Sport
- Sport: Weightlifting
- Event: 76 kg
Medal record
Representing Armenia
Women's weightlifting
European Championships
Silver medal – second place	2025 Chișinău	76 kg
World Junior Championships
Gold medal – first place	2026 Ismailia	77 kg
Bronze medal – third place	2024 Leon	76 kg
European Junior and U23 Championships
Gold medal – first place	2024 Raszyn	76 kg
Bronze medal – third place	2025 Durrës	77 kg
World Youth Championships
Bronze medal – third place	2023 Durrës	76 kg
European Youth Championships
Gold medal – first place	2023 Chișinău	76 kg

Anna Amroyan (born June 5, 2006) is an Armenian weightlifter who competes in the 76 kg weight category. She is a member of the Armenian women's national weightlifting team and is the silver medalist of the 2025 European Weightlifting Championships.

== Career ==
Anna Amroyan has been participating in international weightlifting competitions since 2022. At the 2023 World Youth Weightlifting Championships held in Durrës, Albania, she won the bronze medal in the 76 kg category with a total result of 208 kg.

In 2023, at the European Youth Championships held in Chișinău, Moldova, Amroyan became the champion in the 76 kg weight category with a total lift of 209 kg. She also secured a gold medal at the 2024 European U20 Championships.

At the 2024 World Junior Weightlifting Championships, she won the bronze medal in the 76 kg category with a total result of 228 kg.

In April 2025, at the senior European Championships, Amroyan became the silver medalist in the 76 kg weight category with a total lift of 231 kg.

== Achievements ==
Year	Venue	Weight	Snatch (kg)				Clean & Jerk (kg)				Total	Rank
Year	Venue	Weight	1	2	3	Rank	1	2	3	Rank	Total	Rank
World Championships
2025	Førde, Norway	77 kg	~~100~~	100	~~105~~	17	~~129~~	~~129~~	130	12	230	13
European Championships
2025	Chișinău, Moldova	76 kg	~~95~~	95	100	6	126	~~131~~	131	3rd place, bronze medalist(s)	231	2nd place, silver medalist(s)
2026	(Georgia (country)) Batumi, Georgia	77 kg	~~102~~	~~102~~	~~104~~	—	125	133	136	1st place, gold medalist(s)	—	—
