= Garnik Cholakyan =

Armenian weightlifter (born 2003)

Garnik Cholaqyan
Personal information
- Nationality: Armenia
- Born: 21 December 2001 (age 24)

Sport
- Country: Armenia
- Sport: Weightlifting
- Event: –61 kg,
Medal record
Men's Weightlifting
Representing Armenia
European Championships
Silver medal – second place	2026 Batumi	60 kg
Bronze medal – third place	2025 Chișinău	61 kg
Junior World Championships
Gold medal – first place	2022 Heraklion	55 kg
European U23 Championships
Gold medal – first place	2023 Bucharest	61 kg
Gold medal – first place	2024 Raszyn	61 kg
Gold medal – first place	2025 Durres	60 kg
Junior European Championships
Gold medal – first place	2021 Rovaniemi	55 kg

Garnik Cholakyan (born 21 December 2001), is an Armenian weightlifter, and a bronze medalist at the 2025 European Weightlifting Championships.

== Biography ==
Cholakyan has been competing in international weightlifting competitions since 2019. At the 2019 European Youth Championships, he became the champion in the 49 kg weight category with a total result of 192 kg.

In 2021, at the European Junior Championships, he won the 55 kg weight category with a total of 230 kg. In May 2022, he became the champion at the World Junior Championships in the 55 kg category with a total result of 240 kg. In 2024, he made his debut at the Senior World Championships, where he placed seventh in the 61 kg weight category with a result of 280 kg.

In April 2025, at the 2025 European Weightlifting Championships held in Chișinău, he won the bronze medal in the 61 kg category with a total result of 275 kg. He also earned a small silver medal in the snatch exercise (124 kg).

== Major results ==
Year	Venue	Weight	Snatch (kg)				Clean & Jerk (kg)				Total	Rank
Year	Venue	Weight	1	2	3	Rank	1	2	3	Rank	Total	Rank
World Championships
2024	Manama, Bahrain	61 kg	120	125	130	3rd place, bronze medalist(s)	150	~~155~~	~~155~~	7	280	7
2025	Førde, Norway	60 kg	123	~~128~~	~~130~~	8	152	~~157~~	—	10	275	10
2026	Ningbo, China	65 kg	125	130	~~134~~	15	155	~~161~~	~~161~~	22	285	18
European Championships
2025	Chișinău, Moldova	61 kg	~~123~~	124	~~129~~	2nd place, silver medalist(s)	~~151~~	151	~~153~~	4	275	3rd place, bronze medalist(s)
2026	(Georgia (country)) Batumi, Georgia	60 kg	120	~~124~~	124	2nd place, silver medalist(s)	145	150	~~156~~	3rd place, bronze medalist(s)	274	2nd place, silver medalist(s)
