= Isabella Brown =

English weightlifter

Bella Brown
Personal information
- Full name: Isabella Beatrice Brown
- Born: 2 August 2004 (age 22) Ashford, Middlesex, England

Sport
- Sport: Weightlifting
- Weight class: 76–77 kg (168–170 lb)
Medal record
Women's weightlifting
Representing England
Commonwealth Games
Silver medal – second place	2026 Glasgow	−77 kg
Representing Great Britain
European Junior and U23 Championships
Bronze medal – third place	2023 Bucharest	−76 kg
Bronze medal – third place	2024 Raszyn	−76 kg
Bronze medal – third place	2025 Durrës	−77 kg

Isabella Beatrice Brown (born 2 August 2004) is an English weightlifter. She won a silver medal at the 2026 Commonwealth Games, setting a new Games record in the 77kg division for the clean and jerk.

== Biography ==
From Ashford, Brown started weightlifting in 2019 having competed for ten years in gymnastics prior to that. She is a student at the University of Nottingham.

By 2024, Brown was the British record holder for the U20 and U23 categories in the 76 kg category having lifted a 97 kg snatch and 120 kg clean and jerk, for a total of 217 kg. She was a bronze medalist at the 2024 European Junior Championships. Brown also won the bronze medal in the snatch in the 76kg category at the 2024 World Junior Weightlifting Championships in Spain, and the 2025 European Weightlifting Championships in Moldova.

Brown was selected to represent England at the 2026 Commonwealth Games in Glasgow, Scotland, winning the silver medal in the 77 kg category behind Seine Stowers of Samoa, but breaking the Commonwealth Games record for the weight class with a lift of 132kg in the clean and jerk.
