= Gamze Altun =

Turkish weightlifter (born 2003)

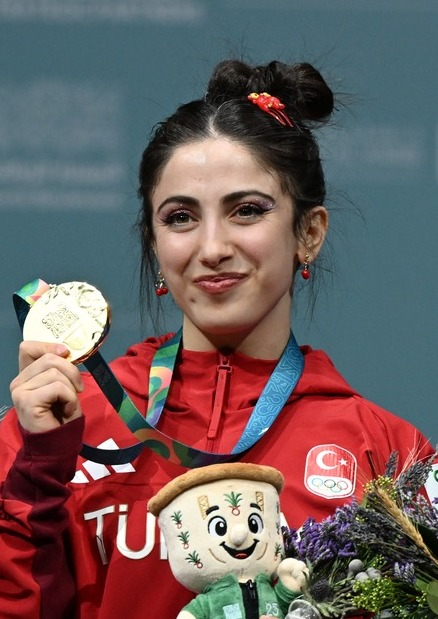
- Altun at the 2025 Islamic Solidarity Games

Personal information
- Born: 29 July 2003 (age 22) Tarsus, Mersin, Turkey
- Education: Selçuk University
- Height: 1.55 m (5 ft 1 in)
- Weight: 45 kg (99 lb)

Sport
- Country: Turkey
- Weight class: 48 kg
Medal record
Women's weightlifting
Representing Turkey
European Championships
Silver medal – second place	2024 Sofia	45 kg
Bronze medal – third place	2025 Chișinău	45 kg
Islamic Solidarity Games
Gold medal – first place	2025 Riyadh	48 kg S
Gold medal – first place	2025 Riyadh	48 kg C&J
Gold medal – first place	2025 Riyadh	48 kg
European U23 Championships
Gold medal – first place	2025 Durres	48 kg
Bronze medal – third place	2024 Raszyn	45 kg
World Junior Championships
Bronze medal – third place	2023 Guadalajara	45 kg
European Junior Championships
Bronze medal – third place	2023 Bucharest	45 kg

Gamze Altun (born 29 July 2003) is a Turkish weightlifter competing in the 45 kg division. She is a native of Tarsus, Mersin, southern Turkey.

== Sport career ==
Altun took the siver medal in the 45 kg clean and jerk event at the 2023 European Weightlifting Championships in Yerevan, Armenia. At the 2024 European Weightlifting Championships in Sofia, Bulgaria, she won the gold medal in the Clean & Jerk event with 92 kg and the silver medal in total with 157 kg. Her lift in Clean & Jerk became the new European U23 record.

Gamze Altun ranked fifth in the women's 45 kg weightlifting category at the 2025 European Weightlifting Championships in Chișinău, Moldova, winning the fifth medal with 68 kg in the snatch, gold with 93 kg in the jerk and bronze with 161 kg in total.

Year	Competition	Venue	Weight	Snatch		Clean & Jerk		Total	
Year	Competition	Venue	Weight	(kg)	Rank	(kg)	Rank	(kg)	Rank
2023	European Championships	Yerevan, Armenia	45 kg	63	5th	89	2nd place, silver medalist(s)	152	4th
2023	World Junior Championships	Guadalajara, Spain	45 kg	63	10th	91	1st place, gold medalist(s)	154	3rd place, bronze medalist(s)
2024	European Championships	Sofia, Bulgaria	45 kg	65	5th	92; EU23R	1st place, gold medalist(s)	157	2nd place, silver medalist(s)
2025	European Championships	Chișinău, Moldova	45 kg	68	5th	93	1st place, gold medalist(s)	161	3rd place, bronze medalist(s)
2025	World Championships	Førde, Norway	48 kg	-	-	99	11th	-	-
2026	European Championships	(Georgia (country)) Batumi, Georgia	48 kg	70	10th	97	2nd place, silver medalist(s)	167	6th
