= Weightlifting at the 2026 Commonwealth Games – Women's 77 kg =

Weightlifting – Women's 77 kg at the 2026 Commonwealth Games
- Venue: Scottish Event Campus
- Dates: 29 July 2026
- Competitors: 11 from 11 nations
- Winning weight: 237 kg

Medalists
gold medal	Seine Stowers	Samoa
silver medal	Isabella Brown	England
bronze medal	Laura Hughes	Wales

The Women's 77 kg weightlifting event at the 2026 Commonwealth Games took place at the SEC Armadillo, Glasgow on 29 July 2026. Samoa's Seine Stowers won the gold medal ahead of Isabella Brown from England who took silver with Laura Hughes of Wales claiming the bronze.

== Qualification ==
A total of 176 weightlifters (88 per gender) qualify to compete at the Games. Nations may earn one quota per weight class, allocated as follows:

- Automatic Qualification – Host CGA (1 per event)
- Direct Qualification – 2025 Commonwealth Weightlifting Champions (1 per event)
- IWF Commonwealth Ranking List (Ranking Period: 01 June 2025 – 18 May 2026) (8 per event)
- Bipartite Invitation (1 per event)

The following lifters qualified in the Women's 77 kg class:

Means of qualification	Quotas	Qualified
Host Nation	1	Agata Herbert (SCO)
2025 Commonwealth Championships	~~1~~0	~~Sarah Ovayioza (NGR)~~
IWF Commonwealth Rankings	8	Rosalie Dumas (CAN); Isabella Brown (ENG); Sanjana (IND); Laura Hughes (WAL); Georgia Theron (NZL); Isabella Andueza (AUS); Rachel Achieng Enock (KEN); Kaitlin Saunders (NIR)
Bipartite Invitation	1	Seine Stowers (SAM)
TOTAL	10	

== Schedule ==
All times are British Summer Time (UTC+1)

Date	Time	Round
29 July 2026	09:00	Final

== Competition ==
Rank	Athlete	Body weight (kg)	Snatch (kg)				Clean & Jerk (kg)				Total
Rank	Athlete	Body weight (kg)	1	2	3	Result	1	2	3	Result	Total
1st place, gold medalist(s)	Seine Stowers (SAM)		101	104	107	107 GR	125	130	~~133~~	130	237 GR
2nd place, silver medalist(s)	Isabella Brown (ENG)		~~97~~	~~97~~	97	97	124	127	132	132 GR	229
3rd place, bronze medalist(s)	Laura Hughes (WAL)		95	~~98~~	~~99~~	95	~~124~~	124	129	129	224
4	Georgia Theron (NZL)		95	98	100	100	117	120	123	123	223
5	Rosalie Dumas (CAN)		96	100	102	102	116	~~120~~	~~121~~	116	218
6	Agata Herbert (SCO)		87	91	~~94~~	91	107	~~111~~	114	114	205
–	Rachel Achieng Enock (KEN)		90	~~93~~	~~93~~	90	~~108~~	–	–	–	NM
–	Sanjana Panchal (IND)		~~94~~	~~94~~	~~94~~	–	–	–	–	–	NM
–	Kaitlin Saunders (NIR)		82	~~85~~	~~85~~	82	~~106~~	~~106~~	~~106~~	–	NM
–	Isabella Andueza (AUS)		~~89~~	~~89~~	~~89~~	–	–	–	–	–	NM
