= 2025 European Weightlifting Championships =

Weightlifting competition in Moldova

- Venue: Chișinău Arena
- Location: Chișinău, Moldova
- Dates: 13–21 April
- Competitors: 333 from 40 nations
- Website: https://haltere.md/en/

The 2025 European Weightlifting Championships was held in Chișinău, Moldova, from 13 to 21 April 2025.

== Host Selection Controversy ==
The European Weightlifting Federation (EWF) picked Moldova to host the 2025 European Senior Weightlifting Championships during its Congress in February 2024. But this choice has stirred up some controversy due to questions about conflicts of interest and how the decision was made of selecting the host.

Moldova's bid was presented without a vote from the Congress, which goes against the EWF's rules. EWF President Antonio Conflitti, who also leads the Weightlifting Federation of Moldova, is under radar for his dual roles, raising concerns about fairness.

On the flip side, the Georgian bid, led by Olympic champions Kakhi Kakhiashvili, George Asanidze, and Lasha Talakhadze, offered some deals, including a budget of 2 million euros and reasonable accommodation prices.

EWF First Vice-President Maksim Agapitov slammed the decision, claiming it was biased because of Conflitti’s influence, especially since Moldova is politically unstable. The Georgian Weightlifting Federation pointed out that it’s essential to have transparency when choosing a host country and suggested that all bids should have been open for discussion at the Congress. They also mentioned plans to submit a new bid for the 2026 European Weightlifting Championships. With the details of Moldova’s bid still not fully out there, concerns about the transparency of the selection process and the legitimacy of the decision hanged in the air.

Later in 2024, in the congress meeting, the 2026 European Weightlifting Championships hosting rights were given to Georgia backhand seeing the backlash from Georgian Federation.

== Official Partnerships ==
The following organizations and businesses have joined as official partners for the 2025 European Weightlifting Championships:

- Seven7rentacar: Official Accommodation Partner
- Cricova: Official Beverages Partner
- Mediashowgrup: Official Event Management Partner
- TINCOMERT GRUP: Official Infrastructure Partner
- TVR: Official Media Partner
- Olympic Moldova: Official Sports Federation Partner
- Chișinău International Airport: Official Transportation Partner
- Arena Națională SRL: Official Venue Partner

== Schedule ==
All times are local (UTC+3).

Men's events
Date →	Mon 14			Tue 15	Wed 16	Thu 17		Fri 18		Sat 19			Sun 20			Mon 21	
Event ↓	10:00	13:00	19:00	16:00	16:00	11:00	19:00	10:00	16:00	12:00	14:00	19:00	09:00	14:00	17:00	10:00	16:00
55 kg	B	A															
61 kg	B		A														
67 kg				A													
73 kg					A												
81 kg						B	A										
89 kg								B	A								
96 kg										B		A					
102 kg											B			A			
109 kg													B		A		
+109 kg																B	A

Women's events
Date →	Sun 13			Mon 14	Tue 15		Wed 16			Thu 17			Fri 18		Sat 19		Sun 20		Mon 21
Event ↓	10:00	16:00	19:00	16:00	13:00	19:00	10:00	13:00	19:00	09:00	13:00	16:00	13:00	19:00	10:00	16:00	11:00	20:00	13:00
45 kg		A																	
49 kg	B		A																
55 kg				A															
59 kg					B	A													
64 kg							C	B	A										
71 kg										C	B	A							
76 kg													B	A					
81 kg															B	A			
87 kg																	B	A	
+87 kg																			A

== Medal table ==
Ranking by "'Big" (Total result) medals

* Host nation (Moldova)

Rank	Nation	Gold	Silver	Bronze	Total
1	Turkey	3	1	2	6
2	Bulgaria	3	0	0	3
3	Armenia	2	6	2	10
4	Italy	2	0	1	3
4	Romania	2	0	1	3
6	Great Britain	2	0	0	2
7	Moldova*	1	2	1	4
8	Germany	1	1	1	3
–	Individual Neutral Athletes	1	1	1	3
9	France	1	0	0	1
9	Iceland	1	0	0	1
9	Norway	1	0	0	1
12	Spain	0	3	0	3
13	Georgia	0	2	1	3
14	Belgium	0	2	0	2
15	Azerbaijan	0	1	0	1
15	Estonia	0	1	0	1
17	Ukraine	0	0	5	5
18	Albania	0	0	1	1
18	Israel	0	0	1	1
18	Latvia	0	0	1	1
18	Poland	0	0	1	1
18	Serbia	0	0	1	1
Totals (22 entries)		20	20	20	60

Ranking by all medals: "'Big" (Total result) and "'Small" (Snatch and Clean & Jerk)

* Host nation (Moldova)

Rank	Nation	Gold	Silver	Bronze	Total
1	Bulgaria	9	0	0	9
2	Turkey	8	7	4	19
3	Armenia	7	13	7	27
4	Great Britain	5	0	3	8
4	Italy	5	0	3	8
6	Moldova*	4	4	5	13
7	Romania	4	3	4	11
–	Individual Neutral Athletes	4	2	5	11
8	Germany	3	3	4	10
9	Norway	3	0	0	3
10	Iceland	2	1	0	3
11	Spain	1	7	2	10
12	Ukraine	1	5	7	13
13	Belgium	1	3	1	5
14	France	1	3	0	4
15	Azerbaijan	1	1	1	3
16	Finland	1	0	0	1
17	Georgia	0	5	4	9
18	Estonia	0	2	0	2
19	Poland	0	1	2	3
20	Albania	0	0	2	2
20	Latvia	0	0	2	2
20	Serbia	0	0	2	2
23	Denmark	0	0	1	1
23	Israel	0	0	1	1
Totals (24 entries)		60	60	60	180

== Medal overview ==
=== Men ===
Event		Gold		Silver		Bronze	
– 55 kg	Snatch	Harun Algül (TUR)	112 kg	Cristian Luca (ROU)	110 kg	Danu Secrieru (MDA)	110 kg
– 55 kg	Clean & Jerk	Angel Rusev (BUL)	141 kg	Danu Secrieru (MDA)	135 kg	Ramini Shamilishvili (GEO)	134 kg
– 55 kg	Total	Angel Rusev (BUL)	246 kg	Danu Secrieru (MDA)	245 kg	Ramini Shamilishvili (GEO)	243 kg
– 61 kg	Snatch	Ivan Dimov (BUL)	135 kg	Garnik Cholakyan (ARM)	124 kg	Goderdzi Berdelidze (GEO)	123 kg
– 61 kg	Clean & Jerk	Ivan Dimov (BUL)	154 kg	Goderdzi Berdelidze (GEO)	153 kg	Ion Badanev (MDA)	152 kg
– 61 kg	Total	Ivan Dimov (BUL)	289 kg	Goderdzi Berdelidze (GEO)	276 kg	Garnik Cholakyan (ARM)	275 kg
– 67 kg	Snatch	Kaan Kahriman (TUR)	146 kg	Ferdi Hardal (TUR)	140 kg	Isa Rustamov (AZE)	138 kg
– 67 kg	Clean & Jerk	Isa Rustamov (AZE)	170 kg	Kaan Kahriman (TUR)	170 kg	Ferdi Hardal (TUR)	165 kg
– 67 kg	Total	Kaan Kahriman (TUR)	316 kg	Isa Rustamov (AZE)	308 kg	Ferdi Hardal (TUR)	305 kg
– 73 kg	Snatch	Roberto Gutu (GER)	155 kg	Yusuf Fehmi Genç (TUR)	154 kg	Gor Sahakyan (ARM)	153 kg
– 73 kg	Clean & Jerk	Yusuf Fehmi Genç (TUR)	194 kg ER	Muhammed Furkan Özbek (TUR)	192 kg	Gor Sahakyan (ARM)	185 kg
– 73 kg	Total	Yusuf Fehmi Genç (TUR)	348 kg =ER	Gor Sahakyan (ARM)	338 kg	Roberto Gutu (GER)	335 kg
– 81 kg	Snatch	Oscar Reyes (ITA)	159 kg	Rafik Harutyunyan (ARM)	158 kg	Andrei Fralou (AIN)	153 kg
– 81 kg	Clean & Jerk	Oscar Reyes (ITA)	190 kg	Dmytro Kondratiuk (UKR)	187 kg	Kristi Ramadani (ALB)	186 kg
– 81 kg	Total	Oscar Reyes (ITA)	349 kg	Rafik Harutyunyan (ARM)	343 kg	Kristi Ramadani (ALB)	337 kg
– 89 kg	Snatch	Marin Robu (MDA)	173 kg	Raphael Friedrich (GER)	171 kg	Lukas Müller (GER)	159 kg
– 89 kg	Clean & Jerk	Raphael Friedrich (GER)	205 kg	Marin Robu (MDA)	202 kg	Lorenzo Tarquini (ITA)	196 kg
– 89 kg	Total	Raphael Friedrich (GER)	376 kg	Marin Robu (MDA)	375 kg	Lorenzo Tarquini (ITA)	353 kg
– 96 kg	Snatch	Karlos Nasar (BUL)	188 kg WR	Revaz Davitadze (GEO)	174 kg	Davit Hovhannisyan (ARM)	173 kg
– 96 kg	Clean & Jerk	Karlos Nasar (BUL)	229 kg ER	Revaz Davitadze (GEO)	205 kg	Davit Hovhannisyan (ARM)	203 kg
– 96 kg	Total	Karlos Nasar (BUL)	417 kg WR	Revaz Davitadze (GEO)	379 kg	Davit Hovhannisyan (ARM)	376 kg
– 102 kg	Snatch	Yauheni Tsikhantsou (AIN)	181 kg	Marcos Ruiz (ESP)	180 kg	Tudor Bratu (MDA)	176 kg
– 102 kg	Clean & Jerk	Yauheni Tsikhantsou (AIN)	218 kg	Marcos Ruiz (ESP)	217 kg	Tudor Bratu (MDA)	210 kg
– 102 kg	Total	Yauheni Tsikhantsou (AIN)	399 kg	Marcos Ruiz (ESP)	397 kg	Tudor Bratu (MDA)	386 kg
– 109 kg	Snatch	Garik Karapetyan (ARM)	185 kg	Simon Martirosyan (ARM)	181 kg	Luis Lauret (ROU)	180 kg
– 109 kg	Clean & Jerk	Garik Karapetyan (ARM)	226 kg	Simon Martirosyan (ARM)	225 kg	Khas-Magomed Balaev (AIN)	215 kg
– 109 kg	Total	Garik Karapetyan (ARM)	411 kg	Simon Martirosyan (ARM)	406 kg	Luis Lauret (ROU)	390 kg
+ 109 kg	Snatch	Varazdat Lalayan (ARM)	210 kg	Bohdan Hoza (UKR)	190 kg	Bakari Turmanidze (GEO)	183 kg
+ 109 kg	Clean & Jerk	Varazdat Lalayan (ARM)	240 kg	Mart Seim (EST)	235 kg	Vladyslav Prylypko (UKR)	220 kg
+ 109 kg	Total	Varazdat Lalayan (ARM)	450 kg	Mart Seim (EST)	415 kg	Bohdan Hoza (UKR)	406 kg

=== Women ===
Event		Gold		Silver		Bronze	
– 45 kg	Snatch	Marta García (ESP)	77 kg	Cansu Bektaş (TUR)	76 kg	Ioana Miron (ROU)	69 kg
– 45 kg	Clean & Jerk	Gamze Altun (TUR)	93 kg	Cansu Bektaş (TUR)	90 kg	Marta García (ESP)	87 kg
– 45 kg	Total	Cansu Bektaş (TUR)	166 kg	Marta García (ESP)	164 kg	Gamze Altun (TUR)	161 kg
– 49 kg	Snatch	Mihaela Cambei (ROU)	85 kg	Lucía González (ESP)	77 kg	Adriana Pană (ROU)	76 kg
– 49 kg	Clean & Jerk	Mihaela Cambei (ROU)	105 kg	Lucía González (ESP)	96 kg	Radmila Zagorac (SRB)	95 kg
– 49 kg	Total	Mihaela Cambei (ROU)	190 kg	Lucía González (ESP)	173 kg	Radmila Zagorac (SRB)	169 kg
– 55 kg	Snatch	Olha Ivzhenko (UKR)	93 kg	Garance Rigaud (FRA)	92 kg	Cansel Özkan (TUR)	91 kg
– 55 kg	Clean & Jerk	Aleksandra Grigoryan (ARM)	117 kg	Garance Rigaud (FRA)	113 kg	Celine Ludovica Delia (ITA)	111 kg
– 55 kg	Total	Garance Rigaud (FRA)	205 kg	Aleksandra Grigoryan (ARM)	202 kg	Olha Ivzhenko (UKR)	201 kg
– 59 kg	Snatch	Nina Sterckx (BEL)	94 kg	Andreea Cotruța (ROU)	94 kg	Rebeka Ibrahima (LAT)	93 kg
– 59 kg	Clean & Jerk	Saara Retulainen (FIN)	115 kg	Andreea Cotruța (ROU)	114 kg	Nina Sterckx (BEL)	113 kg
– 59 kg	Total	Andreea Cotruța (ROU)	208 kg	Nina Sterckx (BEL)	207 kg	Rebeka Ibrahima (LAT)	206 kg
– 64 kg	Snatch	Aysel Özkan (TUR)	100 kg	Svitlana Moskvina (UKR)	100 kg	Dziyana Maiseyevich (AIN)	99 kg
– 64 kg	Clean & Jerk	Sarah Davies (GBR)	127 kg	Vicky Graillot (FRA)	123 kg	Naroa Arrasate (ESP)	122 kg
– 64 kg	Total	Sarah Davies (GBR)	223 kg	Aysel Özkan (TUR)	222 kg	Svitlana Moskvina (UKR)	221 kg
– 71 kg	Snatch	Zarina Gusalova (AIN)	110 kg	Eygló Fanndal Sturludóttir (ISL)	109 kg	Lisa Schweizer (GER)	108 kg
– 71 kg	Clean & Jerk	Eygló Fanndal Sturludóttir (ISL)	135 kg	Siuzanna Valodzka (AIN)	134 kg	Zarina Gusalova (AIN)	131 kg
– 71 kg	Total	Eygló Fanndal Sturludóttir (ISL)	244 kg	Zarina Gusalova (AIN)	241 kg	Siuzanna Valodzka (AIN)	236 kg
– 76 kg	Snatch	Maria Kireva (BUL)	106 kg	Iryna Dombrovska (UKR)	105 kg	Isabella Brown (GBR)	100 kg
– 76 kg	Clean & Jerk	Genna Toko Kegne (ITA)	133 kg	Milena Khachatryan (ARM)	131 kg	Anna Amroyan (ARM)	131 kg
– 76 kg	Total	Genna Toko Kegne (ITA)	233 kg	Anna Amroyan (ARM)	231 kg	Celia Gold (ISR)	230 kg
– 81 kg	Snatch	Elena Erighina (MDA)	106 kg	Weronika Zielińska-Stubińska (POL)	105 kg	Katrina Feklistova (GBR)	105 kg
– 81 kg	Clean & Jerk	Elena Erighina (MDA)	136 kg	Ilke Lagrou (BEL)	134 kg	Weronika Zielińska-Stubińska (POL)	132 kg
– 81 kg	Total	Elena Erighina (MDA)	242 kg	Ilke Lagrou (BEL)	238 kg	Weronika Zielińska-Stubińska (POL)	237 kg
– 87 kg	Snatch	Solfrid Koanda (NOR)	122 kg	Tatev Hakobyan (ARM)	110 kg	Anne Vejsgaard Jensen (DEN)	109 kg
– 87 kg	Clean & Jerk	Solfrid Koanda (NOR)	145 kg	Liana Gyurjyan (ARM)	140 kg	Madias Nzesso (GBR)	130 kg
– 87 kg	Total	Solfrid Koanda (NOR)	267 kg	Liana Gyurjyan (ARM)	246 kg	Anastasiia Manievska (UKR)	235 kg
+ 87 kg	Snatch	Emily Campbell (GBR)	120 kg	Kiara Klug (GER)	111 kg	Valentyna Kisil (UKR)	110 kg
+ 87 kg	Clean & Jerk	Emily Campbell (GBR)	161 kg	Krystyna Borodina (UKR)	132 kg	Kiara Klug (GER)	131 kg
+ 87 kg	Total	Emily Campbell (GBR)	281 kg	Kiara Klug (GER)	242 kg	Valentyna Kisil (UKR)	237 kg

== Participating nations ==
333 weightlifter from 40 countries:

1. Albania (4)
2. Armenia (20)
3. Austria (5)
4. Azerbaijan (1)
5. Belgium (11)
6. Bosnia and Herzegovina (3)
7. Bulgaria (12)
8. Croatia (6)
9. Cyprus (2)
10. Czech Republic (11)
11. Denmark (12)
12. Spain (12)
13. Estonia (2)
14. Finland (14)
15. France (5)
16. Great Britain (11)
17. Georgia (11)
18. Germany (6)
19. Greece (5)
20. Hungary (4)
21. Ireland (9)
22. Iceland (6)
23. Israel (5)
24. Italy (10)
25. Latvia (4)
26. Lithuania (4)
27. Luxembourg (1)
28. Moldova (20) (Host)
29. Netherlands (4)
30. Norway (6)
31. Poland (15)
32. Portugal (3)
33. Romania (15)
34. Slovenia (3)
35. Serbia (3)
36. Switzerland (3)
37. Slovakia (7)
38. Sweden (4)
39. Turkey (20)
40. Ukraine (17)
41. EWF (1)
42. Individual Neutral Athletes (16)

== Men's results ==
=== Men's 55 kg ===
Rank	Athlete	Group	Body weight	Snatch (kg)				Clean & Jerk (kg)				Total
Rank	Athlete	Group	Body weight	1	2	3	Rank	1	2	3	Rank	Total
1st place, gold medalist(s)	Angel Rusev (BUL)	A	55.00	105	~~110~~	~~111~~	8	141	~~150~~	—	1st place, gold medalist(s)	246
2nd place, silver medalist(s)	Danu Secrieru (MDA)	A	54.65	102	106	110	3rd place, bronze medalist(s)	128	132	135	2nd place, silver medalist(s)	245
3rd place, bronze medalist(s)	Ramini Shamilishvili (GEO)	A	54.80	105	109	~~111~~	5	127	131	134	3rd place, bronze medalist(s)	243
4	Marian-Cristian Luca (ROU)	A	54.70	106	110	~~112~~	2nd place, silver medalist(s)	~~127~~	127	132	4	242
5	Harun Algül (TUR)	A	54.90	107	110	112	1st place, gold medalist(s)	125	~~128~~	129	7	241
6	Deniz Danev (BUL)	A	54.80	100	104	107	6	~~130~~	130	~~136~~	6	237
7	Narcis Papolți (ROU)	A	55.00	100	~~104~~	105	9	126	130	~~133~~	5	235
8	Ismail Gadzhibekov (AIN)	A	55.00	102	106	~~111~~	7	120	125	~~131~~	11	231
9	Muammer Şahin (TUR)	A	55.00	109	~~112~~	~~113~~	4	120	—	—	12	229
10	Iulian Betca (MDA)	B	54.55	95	100	~~103~~	11	119	124	127	9	227
11	Dmytro Voronovskyi (UKR)	A	55.00	102	~~105~~	~~105~~	10	125	~~130~~	~~133~~	10	227
12	Michael Otero (ESP)	B	54.80	94	~~98~~	~~98~~	12	123	127	~~130~~	8	221

=== Men's 61 kg ===
Rank	Athlete	Group	Body weight	Snatch (kg)				Clean & Jerk (kg)				Total
Rank	Athlete	Group	Body weight	1	2	3	Rank	1	2	3	Rank	Total
1st place, gold medalist(s)	Ivan Dimov (BUL)	A	60.85	128	131	135	1st place, gold medalist(s)	150	154	—	1st place, gold medalist(s)	289
2nd place, silver medalist(s)	Goderdzi Berdelidze (GEO)	A	60.95	123	~~126~~	~~126~~	3rd place, bronze medalist(s)	146	151	153	2nd place, silver medalist(s)	276
3rd place, bronze medalist(s)	Garnik Cholakyan (ARM)	A	61.00	~~123~~	124	~~129~~	2nd place, silver medalist(s)	~~151~~	151	~~153~~	4	275
4	Ion Badanev (MDA)	A	61.00	~~120~~	120	123	5	147	~~152~~	152	3rd place, bronze medalist(s)	275
5	Burak Aykun (TUR)	A	59.95	~~115~~	115	120	7	143	~~148~~	148	5	268
6	Pavlo Zalipskyi (UKR)	A	60.75	120	123	~~125~~	4	140	143	~~146~~	7	266
7	Daniel Lungu (MDA)	A	61.00	~~122~~	~~122~~	122	6	135	~~140~~	142	8	264
8	Andrii Revko (UKR)	A	61.00	113	116	119	8	~~145~~	~~145~~	145	6	264
9	Stefan Vladisavljev (SRB)	A	60.75	115	~~120~~	~~121~~	10	~~137~~	137	~~145~~	9	252
10	Ion Daniel Dorobete (ROU)	B	60.85	105	110	115	9	125	130	135	10	250
11	Daniel Jigău (ROU)	B	60.55	~~95~~	~~95~~	95	11	125	~~131~~	~~131~~	11	220

=== Men's 67 kg ===
Rank	Athlete	Group	Body weight	Snatch (kg)				Clean & Jerk (kg)				Total
Rank	Athlete	Group	Body weight	1	2	3	Rank	1	2	3	Rank	Total
1st place, gold medalist(s)	Kaan Kahriman (TUR)	A	67.00	142	146	~~151~~	1st place, gold medalist(s)	166	170	~~173~~	2nd place, silver medalist(s)	316
2nd place, silver medalist(s)	Isa Rustamov (AZE)	A	67.00	138	~~141~~	~~142~~	3rd place, bronze medalist(s)	165	170	~~179~~	1st place, gold medalist(s)	308
3rd place, bronze medalist(s)	Ferdi Hardal (TUR)	A	66.95	137	140	~~142~~	2nd place, silver medalist(s)	165	~~169~~	~~170~~	3rd place, bronze medalist(s)	305
4	Gurami Giorbelidze (GEO)	A	66.85	127	~~131~~	~~131~~	4	158	~~166~~	~~167~~	4	285
5	Zdravko Pelovski (BUL)	A	67.00	120	124	126	6	150	154	156	7	282
6	Dimitris Minasidis (CYP)	A	66.75	120	125	~~128~~	7	148	~~153~~	156	6	281
7	Dian Pampordzhiev (BUL)	A	66.80	120	~~124~~	~~126~~	9	154	158	~~163~~	5	278
8	Víctor Castro (ESP)	A	66.80	123	127	~~131~~	5	147	150	~~153~~	8	277
9	Marek Komorowski (POL)	A	67.00	121	~~124~~	124	8	145	~~151~~	~~151~~	9	269
10	Gabriel Danilov (MDA)	A	67.00	114	120	~~123~~	10	138	~~145~~	~~145~~	10	258

=== Men's 73 kg ===
Rank	Athlete	Group	Body weight	Snatch (kg)				Clean & Jerk (kg)				Total
Rank	Athlete	Group	Body weight	1	2	3	Rank	1	2	3	Rank	Total
1st place, gold medalist(s)	Yusuf Fehmi Genç (TUR)	A	72.85	147	151	154	2nd place, silver medalist(s)	187	194	~~195~~	1st place, gold medalist(s)	348
2nd place, silver medalist(s)	Gor Sahakyan (ARM)	A	73.00	150	153	~~156~~	3rd place, bronze medalist(s)	181	185	~~189~~	3rd place, bronze medalist(s)	338
3rd place, bronze medalist(s)	Roberto Gutu (GER)	A	73.00	150	155	~~157~~	1st place, gold medalist(s)	175	180	~~184~~	4	335
4	Tiberiu Donose (ROU)	A	73.00	140	~~148~~	~~148~~	5	170	~~178~~	178	5	318
5	Arberi Cerciz (ALB)	A	72.70	140	~~142~~	145	4	~~171~~	171	~~176~~	7	316
6	Piotr Kudłaszyk (POL)	A	73.00	~~133~~	133	~~136~~	8	170	173	~~178~~	6	306
7	Kacper Urban (POL)	A	73.00	~~135~~	135	139	6	160	165	~~172~~	8	304
8	David Sánchez (ESP)	A	73.00	132	137	~~140~~	7	160	165	~~168~~	9	302
9	Ivan Novko (CRO)	A	72.10	105	110	115	9	140	147	~~152~~	10	262
—	Muhammed Furkan Özbek (TUR)	A	73.00	~~147~~	~~147~~	~~148~~	—	186	192	~~195~~	2nd place, silver medalist(s)	—

=== Men's 81 kg ===
Rank	Athlete	Group	Body weight	Snatch (kg)				Clean & Jerk (kg)				Total
Rank	Athlete	Group	Body weight	1	2	3	Rank	1	2	3	Rank	Total
1st place, gold medalist(s)	Oscar Reyes (ITA)	A	78.85	155	157	159	1st place, gold medalist(s)	185	190	—	1st place, gold medalist(s)	349
2nd place, silver medalist(s)	Rafik Harutyunyan (ARM)	A	81.00	150	155	158	2nd place, silver medalist(s)	185	~~192~~	~~192~~	4	343
3rd place, bronze medalist(s)	Kristi Ramadani (ALB)	A	81.00	151	~~156~~	~~156~~	7	~~185~~	~~186~~	186	3rd place, bronze medalist(s)	337
4	Erkand Qerimaj (ALB)	A	80.90	150	~~154~~	~~154~~	8	183	~~186~~	~~186~~	5	333
5	Andrei Fralou (AIN)	A	80.60	147	151	153	3rd place, bronze medalist(s)	180	~~184~~	~~184~~	7	333
6	Vadzim Likharad (AIN)	A	80.40	148	152	~~156~~	5	180	~~185~~	~~185~~	6	332
7	Dmytro Kondratiuk (UKR)	A	81.00	~~143~~	143	~~147~~	14	183	~~186~~	187	2nd place, silver medalist(s)	330
8	Archil Malakmadze (GEO)	A	80.85	147	152	~~156~~	4	173	~~182~~	~~182~~	13	325
9	Victor Morosanu (MDA)	A	81.00	148	~~152~~	~~153~~	10	~~175~~	175	~~181~~	9	323
10	Christopher Murray (GBR)	B	81.00	142	146	149	9	170	173	~~177~~	12	322
11	Sebastian Cabala (SVK)	B	80.40	144	147	~~150~~	11	175	~~180~~	~~181~~	8	322
12	Petr Mareček (CZE)	B	80.50	140	144	~~147~~	13	165	173	~~176~~	11	317
13	Konrad Lazuga (POL)	B	78.00	141	146	~~148~~	12	170	~~174~~	~~175~~	14	316
14	Mihăiță Tănăsoiu (ROU)	B	80.30	142	~~148~~	~~148~~	15	173	~~180~~	~~180~~	10	315
15	David Birk (SLO)	B	81.00	120	124	127	16	~~148~~	148	155	15	282
16	Kári Steinn Einarsson (ISL)	B	80.65	~~117~~	~~117~~	117	17	143	147	~~150~~	16	264
—	Gheorghii Cernei (MDA)	A	81.00	148	152	~~157~~	6	~~172~~	~~172~~	~~173~~	—	—
—	Hmayak Misakyan (AUT)	B	81.00	~~143~~	~~143~~	~~143~~	—	—	—	—	—	—

=== Men's 89 kg ===
Rank	Athlete	Group	Body weight	Snatch (kg)				Clean & Jerk (kg)				Total
Rank	Athlete	Group	Body weight	1	2	3	Rank	1	2	3	Rank	Total
1st place, gold medalist(s)	Raphael Friedrich (GER)	A	88.70	162	166	171	2nd place, silver medalist(s)	198	205	—	1st place, gold medalist(s)	376
2nd place, silver medalist(s)	Marin Robu (MDA)	A	88.75	165	170	173	1st place, gold medalist(s)	195	202	~~205~~	2nd place, silver medalist(s)	375
3rd place, bronze medalist(s)	Lorenzo Tarquini (ITA)	A	88.15	~~153~~	153	157	5	190	196	~~203~~	3rd place, bronze medalist(s)	353
4	Saba Asanidze (GEO)	A	88.45	150	154	158	4	185	191	194	4	352
5	Lukas Müller (GER)	A	88.50	150	155	159	3rd place, bronze medalist(s)	~~186~~	186	192	5	351
6	Arturs Vasiļonoks (LAT)	A	89.00	151	~~156~~	~~158~~	7	185	~~193~~	~~195~~	6	336
7	Armands Mezinskis (LAT)	A	89.00	~~145~~	145	150	8	175	~~180~~	180	8	330
8	Leho Pent (EST)	A	89.00	141	~~147~~	~~151~~	10	170	183	~~190~~	7	324
9	Patryk Baranski (POL)	B	89.00	146	151	~~155~~	6	~~172~~	172	~~179~~	9	323
10	Youssef El Amrani (BEL)	A	87.90	135	~~140~~	140	12	170	~~175~~	~~175~~	10	310
11	Sean Brown (IRL)	B	88.55	139	142	~~145~~	9	167	~~171~~	~~172~~	12	309
12	Eetu Hautaniemi (FIN)	B	88.55	134	138	~~140~~	13	161	165	168	11	306
13	Bergur Sverrison (ISL)	B	89.00	~~135~~	140	~~142~~	11	~~157~~	162	~~168~~	13	302
—	Mnatsakan Abrahamyan (ARM)	A	88.70	~~152~~	~~152~~	~~153~~	—	~~193~~	~~193~~	~~195~~	—	

=== Men's 96 kg ===
Rank	Athlete	Group	Body weight	Snatch (kg)				Clean & Jerk (kg)				Total
Rank	Athlete	Group	Body weight	1	2	3	Rank	1	2	3	Rank	Total
1st place, gold medalist(s)	Karlos Nasar (BUL)	A	93.35	174	180	188	1st place, gold medalist(s)	210	220	229	1st place, gold medalist(s)	417
2nd place, silver medalist(s)	Revaz Davitadze (GEO)	A	94.75	167	171	174	2nd place, silver medalist(s)	201	205	~~208~~	2nd place, silver medalist(s)	379
3rd place, bronze medalist(s)	Davit Hovhannisyan (ARM)	A	95.85	165	170	173	3rd place, bronze medalist(s)	203	~~207~~	~~207~~	3rd place, bronze medalist(s)	376
4	Egor Klimonov (AIN)	A	96.00	160	164	~~166~~	5	~~202~~	203	~~207~~	4	367
5	Irakli Gobejishvili (GEO)	A	95.10	~~161~~	161	166	4	188	194	~~202~~	7	360
6	Bartłomiej Adamus (POL)	A	96.00	157	162	~~164~~	7	192	197	~~201~~	5	359
7	Anton Serdiukov (UKR)	A	96.00	163	~~168~~	~~168~~	6	190	195	~~198~~	6	358
8	Elias Simbürger (AUT)	B	92.60	142	147	~~150~~	11	183	189	~~195~~	11	336
9	Yannick Tschan (SUI)	B	95.90	146	149	151	9	182	~~189~~	~~189~~	12	333
10	Darius Tătaru (ROU)	B	94.90	135	~~140~~	~~141~~	15	176	182	190	9	325
11	Karol Samko (SVK)	B	96.00	135	~~140~~	~~140~~	14	185	~~190~~	190	10	325
12	Yanush Margulis (ISR)	B	95.10	~~149~~	149	153	8	167	171	~~175~~	16	324
13	Spyridon Pozidis (GRE)	B	95.65	140	144	148	10	168	172	~~177~~	15	302
14	Jakub Barteček (CZE)	B	96.00	136	140	143	12	165	169	173	14	316
15	Antti Peltokangas (FIN)	B	96.00	~~130~~	130	~~134~~	17	180	~~185~~	~~189~~	13	310
16	Shane Roche (IRL)	B	95.35	135	~~139~~	~~140~~	13	163	~~167~~	168	18	303
17	Ciaran Barnes (IRL)	B	95.00	~~125~~	~~125~~	125	18	160	166	171	17	296
18	Peter Dobnik (SLO)	B	93.50	130	~~140~~	~~145~~	16	150	160	~~170~~	19	290
19	Hakan Şükrü Kurnaz (TUR)	A	95.80	~~167~~	~~167~~	~~168~~	—	185	191	~~196~~	8	

=== Men's 102 kg ===
Rank	Athlete	Group	Body weight	Snatch (kg)				Clean & Jerk (kg)				Total
Rank	Athlete	Group	Body weight	1	2	3	Rank	1	2	3	Rank	Total
1st place, gold medalist(s)	Yauheni Tsikhantsou (AIN)	A	101.30	174	178	181	1st place, gold medalist(s)	207	215	218	1st place, gold medalist(s)	399
2nd place, silver medalist(s)	Marcos Ruiz (ESP)	A	102.00	173	177	180	2nd place, silver medalist(s)	210	~~217~~	217	2nd place, silver medalist(s)	397
3rd place, bronze medalist(s)	Tudor Bratu (MDA)	A	101.75	~~170~~	170	176	3rd place, bronze medalist(s)	205	210	~~217~~	3rd place, bronze medalist(s)	386
4	Ara Aghanyan (ARM)	A	100.50	170	175	~~180~~	4	205	~~210~~	~~212~~	5	380
5	Petros Petrosyan (ARM)	A	102.00	~~165~~	165	~~172~~	7	205	~~222~~	~~222~~	4	370
6	Bohdan Buriachek (UKR)	A	102.00	166	170	~~175~~	5	195	~~201~~	~~206~~	7	365
7	Yevhenii Yantsevych (UKR)	A	102.00	~~162~~	162	166	6	190	195	~~200~~	8	361
8	Tudor Ciobanu (MDA)	A	101.80	~~150~~	150	156	8	186	~~195~~	196	6	352
9	Jacob Diakovasilis (DEN)	B	101.37	~~147~~	~~147~~	147	11	186	194	~~200~~	9	341
10	Arnas Šidiškis (LTU)	B	101.35	147	~~151~~	152	9	180	185	188	10	340
11	Seppe Housen (BEL)	B	102.00	~~132~~	132	136	14	177	185	~~190~~	11	321
12	Dino Smajić (BIH)	B	100.45	140	144	150	10	160	167	170	13	320
13	Viktor Ostrovský (SVK)	B	98.25	133	137	~~141~~	13	165	173	~~178~~	12	310
	Dino Đale (CRO)	B	100.50	~~130~~	~~130~~	~~130~~	—	155	162	~~168~~	14	—
	Simon Darville (DEN)	B	101.60	145	~~152~~	—	12	—	—	—	—	—
	Patryk Sawulski (POL)	A	96.50	~~153~~	~~153~~	~~155~~	—	—	—	—	—	—

=== Men's 109 kg ===
Rank	Athlete	Group	Body weight	Snatch (kg)				Clean & Jerk (kg)				Total
Rank	Athlete	Group	Body weight	1	2	3	Rank	1	2	3	Rank	Total
1st place, gold medalist(s)	Garik Karapetyan (ARM)	A	108.08	~~180~~	180	185	1st place, gold medalist(s)	212	220	226	1st place, gold medalist(s)	411
2nd place, silver medalist(s)	Simon Martirosyan (ARM)	A	109.00	~~176~~	~~181~~	181	2nd place, silver medalist(s)	213	~~225~~	225	2nd place, silver medalist(s)	406
3rd place, bronze medalist(s)	Luis Lauret (ROU)	A	109.00	180	~~185~~	~~186~~	3rd place, bronze medalist(s)	206	210	~~214~~	5	390
4	Khas-Magomed Balaev (AIN)	A	108.50	175	~~178~~	178	4	~~205~~	205	215	3rd place, bronze medalist(s)	387
5	Siarhei Sharankou (AIN)	A	108.55	~~172~~	~~172~~	172	7	208	~~213~~	~~214~~	6	386
6	Zaza Lomtadze (GEO)	A	108.75	165	170	173	5	205	213	~~218~~	4	386
7	Longinoz Bregvadze (GEO)	A	108.80	167	172	~~176~~	6	198	~~204~~	205	9	377
8	Muhammed Emin Burun (TUR)	A	108.90	~~165~~	165	170	9	202	207	~~209~~	7	377
9	Vasil Marinov (BUL)	A	109.00	165	~~170~~	171	8	202	~~208~~	~~209~~	10	373
10	Artur Mugurdumov (ISR)	B	108.55	~~161~~	~~162~~	162	12	201	205	~~210~~	8	367
11	Uladzislau Sakovich (AIN)	B	109.00	162	165	~~170~~	11	190	195	~~198~~	14	360
12	Benjamin Ferré (FRA)	B	108.39	153	~~157~~	160	14	~~197~~	200	~~209~~	11	360
13	Josef Kolář (CZE)	B	108.10	155	160	~~163~~	13	190	196	~~201~~	13	356
14	Hugo Ottosson (SWE)	B	106.70	~~147~~	~~147~~	147	15	186	193	200	12	347
15	Rebin Rezazadeh (FIN)	B	108.75	140	~~144~~	~~145~~	16	174	181	~~185~~	15	321
—	Artūrs Plēsnieks (LAT)	A	109.00	160	165	168	10	~~205~~	~~205~~	~~205~~	—	—
—	Roni Peltonen (FIN)	B	108.75	~~143~~	~~143~~	~~147~~	—	—	—	—	—	—

=== Men's +109 kg ===
Rank	Athlete	Group	Body weight	Snatch (kg)				Clean & Jerk (kg)				Total
Rank	Athlete	Group	Body weight	1	2	3	Rank	1	2	3	Rank	Total
1st place, gold medalist(s)	Varazdat Lalayan (ARM)	A	153.40	200	210	~~218~~	1st place, gold medalist(s)	240	~~250~~	—	1st place, gold medalist(s)	450
2nd place, silver medalist(s)	Mart Seim (EST)	A	154.30	175	~~180~~	180	5	227	235	—	2nd place, silver medalist(s)	415
3rd place, bronze medalist(s)	Bohdan Hoza (UKR)	A	124.80	185	190	~~194~~	2nd place, silver medalist(s)	211	216	~~219~~	5	406
4	Bakari Turmanidze (GEO)	A	165.50	177	181	183	3rd place, bronze medalist(s)	213	219	~~224~~	4	402
5	Vladyslav Prylypko (UKR)	A	127.20	162	167	170	8	210	216	220	3rd place, bronze medalist(s)	390
6	Hristo Hristov (BUL)	A	119.00	170	176	178	6	205	~~212~~	~~214~~	9	383
7	Ragnar Holme (NOR)	A	145.00	170	176	182	4	200	~~210~~	—	10	382
8	Kamil Kučera (CZE)	A	150.90	160	166	~~171~~	9	~~210~~	211	~~218~~	6	377
9	Ali Oflaz (TUR)	A	150.70	161	166	~~169~~	10	210	~~215~~	~~217~~	7	376
10	Szymon Ziółkowski (POL)	B	126.20	~~168~~	168	175	7	195	~~205~~	~~205~~	11	370
11	Karolis Stonkus (LTU)	B	135.40	153	158	~~162~~	12	200	207	~~212~~	8	365
12	Ioannis Athanasiou (GRE)	B	156.10	158	~~163~~	~~163~~	11	192	~~197~~	—	12	350
13	Hanno Keskitalo (FIN)	B	149.70	155	~~160~~	~~160~~	14	180	185	~~190~~	14	340
14	Arnošt Vogel (CZE)	B	109.80	142	147	~~151~~	15	175	185	~~191~~	13	332
15	Radoslav Tatarčík (SVK)	B	111.90	~~156~~	158	~~161~~	13	163	173	~~177~~	15	331
16	Križan Rajič (CRO)	B	126.40	135	142	~~146~~	16	~~160~~	160	168	16	310

== Women's results ==
=== Women's 45 kg ===
Rank	Athlete	Group	Body weight	Snatch (kg)				Clean & Jerk (kg)				Total
Rank	Athlete	Group	Body weight	1	2	3	Rank	1	2	3	Rank	Total
1st place, gold medalist(s)	Cansu Bektaş (TUR)	A	45.00	72	74	76	2nd place, silver medalist(s)	~~90~~	90	~~94~~	2nd place, silver medalist(s)	166
2nd place, silver medalist(s)	Marta García (ESP)	A	44.65	73	75	77	1st place, gold medalist(s)	~~87~~	~~87~~	87	3rd place, bronze medalist(s)	164
3rd place, bronze medalist(s)	Gamze Altun (TUR)	A	44.95	68	~~70~~	~~70~~	5	~~93~~	93	~~97~~	1st place, gold medalist(s)	161
4	Ioana Miron (ROU)	A	44.50	65	69	71	3rd place, bronze medalist(s)	82	86	~~88~~	4	157
5	Gabriela Danilov (MDA)	A	44.70	63	66	69	4	78	81	~~86~~	6	150
6	Sonja Koponen (FIN)	A	45.00	63	66	~~69~~	6	~~80~~	81	~~84~~	7	147
7	Tetiana Budnikova (UKR)	A	45.00	61	63	~~65~~	7	79	82	~~85~~	5	145
8	Ecaterina Grabucea (MDA)	A	45.00	60	62	~~64~~	8	80	~~83~~	~~84~~	8	142
—	Tihana Majer (CRO)	A	44.55	52	~~54~~	~~55~~	9	~~73~~	~~73~~	~~73~~	—	—

=== Women's 49 kg ===
Rank	Athlete	Group	Body weight	Snatch (kg)				Clean & Jerk (kg)				Total
Rank	Athlete	Group	Body weight	1	2	3	Rank	1	2	3	Rank	Total
1st place, gold medalist(s)	Mihaela Cambei (ROU)	A	49.00	~~85~~	~~85~~	85	1st place, gold medalist(s)	97	100	105	1st place, gold medalist(s)	190
2nd place, silver medalist(s)	Lucia González Borrego (ESP)	A	48.60	~~74~~	75	77	2nd place, silver medalist(s)	93	~~96~~	96	2nd place, silver medalist(s)	173
3rd place, bronze medalist(s)	Radmila Zagorac (SRB)	A	48.80	71	74	~~76~~	6	90	95	~~97~~	3rd place, bronze medalist(s)	169
4	Maria Stratoudaki (GRE)	A	48.85	70	73	75	4	93	~~96~~	~~96~~	6	168
5	Cosmina Adriana Pană (ROU)	A	48.70	73	76	~~78~~	3rd place, bronze medalist(s)	91	~~95~~	~~95~~	8	167
6	Tammy Wong (GBR)	B	48.60	69	72	74	5	87	91	~~94~~	7	165
7	Duygu Alıcı (TUR)	A	48.85	70	~~74~~	~~74~~	9	92	95	~~96~~	4	165
8	Oliwia Drzazga (POL)	A	48.95	62	65	67	12	92	94	~~96~~	5	161
9	Nikole Roberts (GBR)	B	49.00	71	73	~~75~~	7	85	~~87~~	~~88~~	11	158
10	Alina Popescu (MDA)	B	48.95	65	~~70~~	70	8	80	85	~~89~~	12	155
11	Mara Strzykala (LUX)	A	48.95	~~67~~	67	~~70~~	11	~~87~~	87	~~92~~	10	154
12	Ivana Petrova (BUL)	A	48.85	65	68	~~70~~	10	83	~~86~~	~~86~~	13	151
13	Rebecca Copeland (IRL)	B	48.65	63	65	~~67~~	13	77	~~80~~	80	14	145
—	Sira Armengou (ESP)	A	48.35	~~73~~	~~73~~	~~73~~	—	88	91	~~94~~	9	—

=== Women's 55 kg ===
Rank	Athlete	Group	Body weight	Snatch (kg)				Clean & Jerk (kg)				Total
Rank	Athlete	Group	Body weight	1	2	3	Rank	1	2	3	Rank	Total
1st place, gold medalist(s)	Garance Rigaud (FRA)	A	54.45	88	91	92	2nd place, silver medalist(s)	107	111	113	2nd place, silver medalist(s)	205
2nd place, silver medalist(s)	Aleksandra Grigoryan (ARM)	A	54.95	~~85~~	85	~~88~~	6	117	~~121~~	~~121~~	1st place, gold medalist(s)	202
3rd place, bronze medalist(s)	Olha Ivzhenko (UKR)	A	55.00	89	91	93	1st place, gold medalist(s)	105	108	~~111~~	5	201
4	Celine Ludovica Delia (ITA)	A	55.00	87	90	~~92~~	4	~~110~~	111	~~117~~	3rd place, bronze medalist(s)	201
5	Cansel Özkan (TUR)	A	55.00	87	~~90~~	91	3rd place, bronze medalist(s)	103	106	109	4	200
6	Izabella Yaylyan (ARM)	A	55.00	85	88	90	5	103	~~108~~	~~108~~	8	193
7	Yuliya Kastsianiova (AIN)	A	54.85	80	~~84~~	84	9	~~98~~	98	101	10	185
8	Burcu Alıcı (TUR)	A	54.85	80	84	~~86~~	8	~~100~~	~~100~~	100	11	184
9	Rebekka Tao Jacobsen (NOR)	A	55.00	77	79	~~81~~	11	101	104	~~108~~	6	183
10	Nicoleta Cojocaru (MDA)	A	54.60	79	~~83~~	~~84~~	10	~~99~~	103	~~109~~	7	182
11	Marlous Schuilwerve (NED)	B	54.65	80	84	~~70~~	7	93	~~96~~	97	12	181
12	Anette Kirkanen (FIN)	B	54.80	74	78	~~80~~	12	90	~~95~~	~~95~~	15	168
13	Estefania Dobre (ROU)	B	54.95	75	~~79~~	~~79~~	13	90	93	~~98~~	14	168
14	Diana Nygren Brogaard (DEN)	B	54.20	68	70	72	14	87	~~90~~	~~90~~	16	159
15	Maelle Maes (BEL)	B	54.90	67	~~70~~	70	16	83	86	~~88~~	17	156
16	Serife Ustuner (CYP)	B	53.65	64	67	70	15	83	86	~~89~~	18	156
17	Margarida Pontes (POR)	B	53.50	58	~~64~~	~~67~~	17	82	~~86~~	~~90~~	19	140
—	Sol Anette Waaler (NOR)	A	54.85	~~81~~	~~81~~	~~81~~	—	98	101	~~104~~	9	—
—	Cintia Árva (HUN)	B	52.35	~~72~~	~~72~~	~~72~~	—	95	~~98~~	~~100~~	13	—

=== Women's 59 kg ===
Rank	Athlete	Group	Body weight	Snatch (kg)				Clean & Jerk (kg)				Total
Rank	Athlete	Group	Body weight	1	2	3	Rank	1	2	3	Rank	Total
1st place, gold medalist(s)	Andreea Cotruţa (ROU)	A	58.85	91	94	~~97~~	2nd place, silver medalist(s)	114	~~118~~	~~120~~	2nd place, silver medalist(s)	208
2nd place, silver medalist(s)	Nina Sterckx (BEL)	A	58.80	94	~~97~~	~~97~~	1st place, gold medalist(s)	113	~~117~~	~~120~~	3rd place, bronze medalist(s)	207
3rd place, bronze medalist(s)	Rebeka Ibrahima (LAT)	A	58.80	88	91	93	3rd place, bronze medalist(s)	105	108	113	4	206
4	Katsiaryna Yakushava (AIN)	A	58.90	85	89	~~91~~	6	105	107	110	5	199
5	Katsiaryna Tsimashenka (AIN)	A	58.80	85	88	~~90~~	7	105	108	~~112~~	6	196
6	Greta De Riso (ITA)	A	58.95	85	89	~~91~~	5	~~106~~	106	~~113~~	9	195
7	Maëlyn Michel (FRA)	A	58.80	89	~~92~~	~~92~~	4	~~106~~	~~106~~	106	10	195
8	Maria Kardara (GRE)	A	58.80	85	88	~~91~~	8	100	105	107	7	195
9	Jessica Gordon Brown (GBR)	B	58.60	~~85~~	85	~~90~~	9	106	~~110~~	~~110~~	8	191
10	Laura García Rincon (ESP)	B	58.55	84	~~86~~	~~87~~	10	~~104~~	104	~~107~~	11	188
11	Annelien Vandenabeele (BEL)	B	58.60	80	82	~~84~~	12	98	101	103	12	185
12	Moa Henriksson (SWE)	B	58.70	~~81~~	81	~~83~~	13	97	100	~~102~~	15	181
13	Irene Martínez (ESP)	B	58.65	~~83~~	~~83~~	83	11	97	~~100~~	~~100~~	17	180
14	Rita Gomez (POR)	B	57.90	~~80~~	~~80~~	80	15	96	100	~~103~~	14	180
15	Þuríður Helgadóttir (ISL)	B	58.95	~~76~~	~~77~~	77	18	99	102	~~105~~	13	179
16	Siri Sytela (FIN)	B	58.95	~~75~~	75	77	17	95	98	~~101~~	16	175
17	Zuzanna Polka (POL)	B	56.45	~~77~~	77	79	16	~~92~~	92	~~95~~	18	171
18	Maria Mitioglo (MDA)	B	58.80	76	~~79~~	~~79~~	19	86	90	~~94~~	19	166
19	Niamh Murray (IRL)	B	57.85	63	65	67	20	~~86~~	86	90	20	166
—	Saara Retulainen (FIN)	A	58.80	~~92~~	~~92~~	~~92~~	—	~~114~~	~~115~~	115	1st place, gold medalist(s)	—
—	Scheilla Meister (SUI)	B	58.30	~~81~~	~~81~~	81	14	~~101~~	~~101~~	~~101~~	—	—

=== Women's 64 kg ===
Rank	Athlete	Group	Body weight	Snatch (kg)				Clean & Jerk (kg)				Total
Rank	Athlete	Group	Body weight	1	2	3	Rank	1	2	3	Rank	Total
1st place, gold medalist(s)	Sarah Davies (GBR)	A	64.00	~~96~~	96	~~99~~	6	123	125	127	1st place, gold medalist(s)	223
2nd place, silver medalist(s)	Aysel Özkan (TUR)	A	63.80	96	100	~~102~~	1st place, gold medalist(s)	116	120	122	4	222
3rd place, bronze medalist(s)	Svitlana Moskvina (UKR)	A	63.30	98	100	~~102~~	2nd place, silver medalist(s)	117	121	~~123~~	7	221
4	Dziyana Maiseyevich (AIN)	B	63.65	95	98	99	3rd place, bronze medalist(s)	115	118	121	5	220
5	Nuray Güngör (TUR)	A	63.85	96	~~100~~	~~101~~	5	117	121	~~123~~	6	217
6	Helena Avendano (ESP)	A	63.80	~~93~~	93	98	4	118	~~121~~	~~121~~	9	216
7	Galya Shatova (BUL)	A	63.85	92	~~95~~	~~97~~	13	116	119	~~122~~	8	211
8	Vicky Graillot (FRA)	A	63.95	88	~~91~~	~~92~~	20	~~118~~	~~122~~	123	2nd place, silver medalist(s)	211
9	Tamara Arunović (SRB)	B	64.00	93	~~95~~	95	7	~~112~~	~~113~~	114	14	209
10	Vitaliia Fylypiv (UKR)	B	64.00	92	94	~~96~~	11	111	115	~~117~~	11	209
11	Chiara Piccinino (ITA)	B	64.00	90	94	~~96~~	10	110	114	~~117~~	13	208
12	Patricie Ježková (CZE)	B	63.80	89	92	95	9	109	~~112~~	113	16	208
13	Anca Grosu (ROU)	B	63.50	90	~~94~~	~~94~~	16	112	~~116~~	116	10	206
14	Sabine Kusterer (GER)	B	62.85	89	91	~~93~~	14	110	~~114~~	114	15	205
15	Wiktoria Wołk (POL)	A	62.75	~~90~~	90	~~94~~	17	110	113	115	12	205
16	Marit Årdalsbakke (NOR)	B	64.00	88	91	94	12	106	110	~~112~~	17	204
17	Paula Zikowsky (AUT)	C	63.05	88	~~91~~	~~91~~	18	103	106	108	19	196
18	Joana Chong (POR)	C	63.60	85	~~90~~	90	15	105	~~110~~	~~112~~	21	195
19	Eva Stassijns (BEL)	C	62.65	81	84	87	21	101	105	107	20	194
20	Katla Björk Ketilsdóttir (ISL)	C	61.35	~~85~~	88	~~90~~	19	101	105	~~107~~	23	193
21	Hannah Crymble (IRL)	C	62.80	83	~~86~~	87	22	101	105	~~107~~	22	192
22	Amalie Løvind Årsten (DEN)	C	61.20	81	~~84~~	~~84~~	25	105	109	~~112~~	18	190
23	Bibiána Večeřová (SVK)	C	63.70	83	~~86~~	~~88~~	23	102	~~105~~	~~106~~	24	185
24	Helena Rønnebæk (DEN)	C	62.55	80	~~83~~	83	24	101	~~105~~	~~106~~	25	184
25	Cristina Stanciu (BEL)	C	63.95	80	~~83~~	~~83~~	26	98	101	~~104~~	26	181
26	Rachel Monaghan (IRL)	C	61.80	71	74	77	28	94	97	100	27	177
27	Petra Pavlić (SLO)	C	62.60	73	78	~~81~~	27	~~90~~	90	~~95~~	28	168
28	Azra Alatović (BIH)	C	62.65	63	~~66~~	66	29	80	83	85	29	151
—	Naroa Arrasate (ESP)	B	64.00	~~90~~	~~90~~	~~90~~	—	117	~~120~~	122	3rd place, bronze medalist(s)	—
—	Myrthe Timmermans (NED)	B	64.00	~~85~~	~~85~~	~~85~~	—	—	—	—	—	—
—	Martina Chiacchio (ITA)	A	63.80	95	~~99~~	~~99~~	8	—	—	—	—	—

=== Women's 71 kg ===
Rank	Athlete	Group	Body weight	Snatch (kg)				Clean & Jerk (kg)				Total
Rank	Athlete	Group	Body weight	1	2	3	Rank	1	2	3	Rank	Total
1st place, gold medalist(s)	Eygló Fanndal Sturludóttir (ISL)	A	71.00	103	106	109	2nd place, silver medalist(s)	129	133	135	1st place, gold medalist(s)	244
2nd place, silver medalist(s)	Zarina Gusalova (AIN)	A	70.80	105	108	110	1st place, gold medalist(s)	127	131	~~134~~	3rd place, bronze medalist(s)	241
3rd place, bronze medalist(s)	Siuzanna Valodzka (AIN)	A	70.55	~~101~~	~~101~~	102	5	128	131	134	2nd place, silver medalist(s)	236
4	Janette Ylisoini (FIN)	A	70.90	100	103	107	4	125	~~130~~	~~130~~	5	232
5	Lisa Schweizer (GER)	A	70.75	102	106	108	3rd place, bronze medalist(s)	118	122	~~125~~	6	230
6	Line Gude (DEN)	A	69.80	95	~~99~~	~~100~~	10	120	126	~~132~~	4	221
7	Jennifer Andersson (SWE)	A	68.90	95	~~98~~	98	7	116	120	~~123~~	8	218
8	Garoa Martínez (ESP)	A	67.60	94	98	~~100~~	6	118	~~122~~	~~122~~	9	216
9	Erin Barton (GBR)	A	70.35	~~91~~	91	94	12	121	~~125~~	~~126~~	7	215
10	Laurene Fauvel (FRA)	B	68.00	91	94	97	9	114	~~118~~	~~119~~	12	211
11	Lijana Jakaitė (LTU)	B	70.95	93	97	~~99~~	8	114	~~119~~	~~119~~	13	211
12	Aino Luostarinen (FIN)	B	70.70	~~90~~	91	94	11	115	~~120~~	~~120~~	10	209
13	Julia Loen (NOR)	B	70.70	89	~~92~~	~~92~~	13	108	111	~~114~~	13	200
14	Mirjam von Rohr (SUI)	B	69.50	80	85	~~90~~	19	108	115	~~118~~	11	200
15	Gina McMonagle (IRL)	C	67.95	82	85	87	16	107	110	~~112~~	15	197
16	Natália Hušťavová (SVK)	C	67.50	83	86	~~88~~	17	~~105~~	105	109	16	195
17	Despoina Polaktsidou (GRE)	B	70.30	~~88~~	88	~~91~~	14	~~107~~	107	~~111~~	19	195
18	Wiktoria Gierczuk (POL)	B	70.70	~~88~~	88	~~91~~	15	103	106	~~108~~	20	194
19	Alina Novak (AUT)	B	69.75	83	86	~~89~~	18	103	107	~~110~~	18	193
20	Lucie Minarová (CZE)	C	69.90	75	~~80~~	~~80~~	21	97	~~101~~	~~102~~	21	172
21	Barbara Maljković (CRO)	C	68.35	72	75	~~78~~	22	95	—	—	22	170
22	Emilia Wódzka (DEN)	C	66.75	73	74	~~77~~	23	85	~~88~~	~~88~~	23	159
—	Dalit Kugel (ISR)	B	70.50	~~88~~	~~88~~	~~90~~	—	107	~~111~~	~~111~~	17	—
—	Senna Vanmechele (BEL)	C	70.50	79	82	~~84~~	20	~~98~~	~~98~~	~~101~~	—	—

=== Women's 76 kg ===
Rank	Athlete	Group	Body weight	Snatch (kg)				Clean & Jerk (kg)				Total
Rank	Athlete	Group	Body weight	1	2	3	Rank	1	2	3	Rank	Total
1st place, gold medalist(s)	Genna Romida Toko Kegne (ITA)	A	75.50	100	~~104~~	~~104~~	4	125	130	133	1st place, gold medalist(s)	233
2nd place, silver medalist(s)	Anna Amroyan (ARM)	A	75.55	~~95~~	95	100	6	126	~~131~~	131	3rd place, bronze medalist(s)	231
3rd place, bronze medalist(s)	Celia Gold (ISR)	A	74.55	96	~~99~~	100	7	127	130	~~132~~	4	230
4	Iryna Dombrovska (UKR)	A	75.75	100	103	105	2nd place, silver medalist(s)	120	124	~~127~~	5	229
5	Maria Kireva (BUL)	A	76.00	100	104	106	1st place, gold medalist(s)	117	120	~~122~~	9	226
6	Milena Khachatryan (ARM)	A	76.00	95	~~100~~	~~100~~	12	121	128	131	2nd place, silver medalist(s)	226
7	Isabella Brown (GBR)	B	75.85	97	100	~~103~~	3rd place, bronze medalist(s)	117	120	123	7	223
8	Alexandrina Ciubotaru (MDA)	A	75.75	99	~~102~~	~~102~~	8	120	124	~~127~~	6	223
9	Monika Marach (POL)	A	72.75	100	~~103~~	~~104~~	5	~~117~~	118	–	12	218
10	Medine Saime Balaban (TUR)	A	74.10	95	99	~~101~~	9	119	~~124~~	~~125~~	10	218
11	Nikki Löwik (NED)	A	75.85	98	~~101~~	~~101~~	10	120	~~124~~	~~124~~	8	218
12	Nicole Rubanovich (ISR)	B	75.05	94	97	~~100~~	11	113	117	~~120~~	13	214
13	Guðný Björk Stefánsdóttir (ISL)	A	71.20	94	~~101~~	~~101~~	14	118	~~122~~	~~125~~	11	212
14	Laura Vest Tolstrup (DEN)	B	74.15	90	~~94~~	94	13	116	~~121~~	~~121~~	14	210
15	Laura Horvath (HUN)	B	76.00	87	90	92	15	111	114	~~118~~	16	206
16	Minni Hormavirta (FIN)	B	75.75	~~90~~	90	~~92~~	17	112	115	~~120~~	15	205
17	Simona Jeřábková (CZE)	B	74.40	85	89	91	16	105	109	113	17	204
18	Ida Åkerlund (SWE)	B	73.85	84	87	~~89~~	22	108	~~111~~	112	18	199
19	Iris Dossche (BEL)	B	75.25	85	~~88~~	89	19	105	~~108~~	109	20	198
20	Nelli Nurmi (FIN)	B	77.25	82	86	88	21	103	107	109	19	197
21	Morgane Thyssen (BEL)	B	74.90	86	89	~~91~~	18	106	~~109~~	~~110~~	21	195
22	Ivona Gavran (CRO)	B	75.00	84	88	~~91~~	20	~~106~~	106	~~109~~	22	194
23	Kaitlin Saunders (IRL)	B	73.90	~~79~~	79	82	23	96	101	104	23	186
24	Adriana Conac (MDA)	B	71.55	73	76	78	24	95	100	~~105~~	24	178

=== Women's 81 kg ===
Rank	Athlete	Group	Body weight	Snatch (kg)				Clean & Jerk (kg)				Total
Rank	Athlete	Group	Body weight	1	2	3	Rank	1	2	3	Rank	Total
1st place, gold medalist(s)	Elena Erighina (MDA)	A	80.35	~~102~~	103	106	1st place, gold medalist(s)	130	134	136	1st place, gold medalist(s)	242
2nd place, silver medalist(s)	Ilke Lagrou (BEL)	A	80.40	98	101	104	5	~~128~~	128	134	2nd place, silver medalist(s)	238
3rd place, bronze medalist(s)	Weronika Zielińska-Stubińska (POL)	A	80.50	102	105	~~107~~	2nd place, silver medalist(s)	128	132	~~136~~	3rd place, bronze medalist(s)	237
4	Mariia Gruzdova (AIN)	A	80.70	100	104	~~107~~	4	127	131	~~135~~	4	235
5	Emma Poghosyan (ARM)	A	80.50	100	~~105~~	~~105~~	7	130	~~138~~	~~138~~	5	230
6	Katrina Feklistova (GBR)	A	79.45	101	~~103~~	105	3rd place, bronze medalist(s)	120	124	~~127~~	7	229
7	Gintarė Bražaitė (LTU)	A	79.00	95	98	101	6	117	121	124	8	225
8	Natia Gadelia (GEO)	A	80.80	95	~~99~~	99	9	118	124	~~127~~	6	223
9	Alexandra Alexe (ROU)	A	79.70	95	100	~~103~~	8	115	~~121~~	122	9	222
10	Margarita Arakelyan (ARM)	A	79.50	91	~~95~~	95	10	116	~~120~~	~~120~~	10	211
11	Joyce de Koning (NED)	B	80.25	93	~~96~~	~~96~~	11	106	~~109~~	~~109~~	13	199
12	Caroline Gernsøe (DEN)	B	79.95	~~83~~	83	86	14	~~112~~	112	~~117~~	11	198
13	Emma Gleisner (FIN)	B	79.90	85	~~89~~	~~89~~	15	107	110	~~115~~	12	195
14	Eliška Nováková (CZE)	B	78.15	~~83~~	83	87	12	~~103~~	~~104~~	104	15	191
15	Eliška Šmigová (CZE)	B	80.70	83	~~86~~	~~87~~	16	~~105~~	105	~~109~~	14	188
16	Ecaterina Kurouskaia (MDA)	B	76.50	83	86	~~89~~	13	101	~~104~~	~~106~~	16	187
	Dilara Narin (TUR)	A	80.85	~~90~~	~~90~~	~~90~~	—	—	—	—	—	—

=== Women's 87 kg ===
Rank	Athlete	Group	Body weight	Snatch (kg)				Clean & Jerk (kg)				Total
Rank	Athlete	Group	Body weight	1	2	3	Rank	1	2	3	Rank	Total
1st place, gold medalist(s)	Solfrid Koanda (NOR)	A	86.95	~~117~~	117	122	1st place, gold medalist(s)	145	—	—	1st place, gold medalist(s)	267
2nd place, silver medalist(s)	Liana Gyurjyan (ARM)	A	86.55	100	104	106	4	130	135	140	2nd place, silver medalist(s)	246
3rd place, bronze medalist(s)	Anastasiia Manievska (UKR)	A	86.40	102	105	~~107~~	5	125	~~130~~	130	4	235
4	Tatev Hakobyan (ARM)	A	86.95	102	106	110	2nd place, silver medalist(s)	~~122~~	122	~~130~~	9	232
5	Anne Vejsgaard Jensen (DEN)	B	86.90	100	105	109	3rd place, bronze medalist(s)	115	~~120~~	122	8	231
6	Tuana Süren (TUR)	A	86.25	100	~~104~~	~~105~~	9	125	~~131~~	~~131~~	5	225
7	Darya Kheidzer (AIN)	A	86.00	100	~~105~~	~~105~~	8	115	120	124	6	224
8	Nikola Seničová (SVK)	A	86.90	~~98~~	98	101	7	~~117~~	117	~~121~~	10	218
9	Veronika Mitykó (HUN)	B	83.20	100	104	~~106~~	6	~~112~~	~~112~~	112	11	216
10	Viktória Boros (HUN)	B	84.35	83	~~87~~	87	11	103	107	110	12	197
11	Pavlína Šedá (CZE)	B	87.00	84	89	91	10	98	104	~~109~~	13	195
	Madias Nzesso (GBR)	A	86.90	~~112~~	~~112~~	~~112~~	—	130	~~134~~	~~136~~	3rd place, bronze medalist(s)	—
	Sarah Fischer (AUT)	A	86.80	~~95~~	~~95~~	~~95~~	—	—	—	—	—	—

=== Women's +87 kg ===
Rank	Athlete	Group	Body weight	Snatch (kg)				Clean & Jerk (kg)				Total
Rank	Athlete	Group	Body weight	1	2	3	Rank	1	2	3	Rank	Total
1st place, gold medalist(s)	Emily Campbell (GBR)	A	131.10	112	116	120	1st place, gold medalist(s)	150	156	161	1st place, gold medalist(s)	281
2nd place, silver medalist(s)	Kiara Klug (GER)	A	92.90	106	109	111	2nd place, silver medalist(s)	127	131	~~133~~	3rd place, bronze medalist(s)	242
3rd place, bronze medalist(s)	Valentyna Kisil (UKR)	A	100.80	105	108	110	3rd place, bronze medalist(s)	121	~~127~~	127	4	237
4	Krystyna Borodina (UKR)	A	95.60	98	~~102~~	~~102~~	5	126	128	132	2nd place, silver medalist(s)	230
5	Meri Tumasyan (ARM)	A	101.60	90	95	98	6	110	116	~~122~~	6	214
6	Dzhesika Ivanova (BUL)	A	96.80	91	95	~~98~~	7	115	~~120~~	~~120~~	7	210
7	Anastasia Cîlcic (MDA)	A	88.30	85	90	94	8	110	116	~~120~~	5	210
8	Aurelia Rebekka Pedersen (DEN)	A	131.60	90	~~95~~	~~98~~	9	105	110	115	10	205
	Mercy Brown (GBR)	A	104.50	104	108	~~111~~	4	—	—	—	—	—
	Julieta Avanesyan (ARM)	A	127.00	80	86	~~91~~	10	—	—	—	—	—
