= Bohdan Hoza =

Ukrainian weightlifter

Personal information
- Nationality: Ukrainian
- Born: 12 January 2002 (age 24)
- Weight: 108.95 kg (240.2 lb)

Sport
- Country: Ukraine
- Sport: Weightlifting
- Weight class: 109 kg

Achievements and titles
- Personal bests: Snatch: 195 kg (2022); Clean and jerk: 215 kg (2022); Total: 410 kg (2022)
Medal record
Representing Ukraine
European Championships
Bronze medal – third place	2025 Chișinău	+109 kg
European U23 Championships
Silver medal – second place	2025 Durres	+110 kg
Junior World Championships
Gold medal – first place	2022 Heraklion	109 kg
Silver medal – second place	2021 Tashkent	109 kg

Bohdan Hoza (Ukrainian: Богдан Гоза; born 12 January 2002) is a Ukrainian weightlifter, and Junior World Champion. He won the gold medal in the 2022 Junior World Weightlifting Championships in the 109 kg event.

He holds the junior world record in the snatch 109 kg division.

== Major results ==
Year	Venue	Weight	Snatch (kg)				Clean & Jerk (kg)				Total	Rank
Year	Venue	Weight	1	2	3	Rank	1	2	3	Rank	Total	Rank
European Championships
2025	Chișinău, Moldova	+109 kg	185	190	~~194~~	2nd place, silver medalist(s)	211	216	~~219~~	5	406	3rd place, bronze medalist(s)
World Junior Championships
2021	Tashkent, Uzbekistan	109 kg	181	~~187~~	189	1st place, gold medalist(s)	201	~~208~~	213	2nd place, silver medalist(s)	402	2nd place, silver medalist(s)
2022	Heraklion, Greece	109 kg	180	191	195	1st place, gold medalist(s)	205	215	—	1st place, gold medalist(s)	410	1st place, gold medalist(s)
