= List of European junior records in Olympic weightlifting =

This is the list of European junior records in Olympic weightlifting. European junior records are the best marks set in competition by athletes aged 20 or younger throughout the entire calendar year of the performance. Records are maintained in each weight class for the snatch lift, Clean and jerk lift, and the total for both lifts by the European Weightlifting Federation (EWF).

== Current records ==
Key to tables: Awaiting ratification Not ratified or later rescinded by EWF

=== Men ===
Event	Record	Athlete	Nation	Date	Meet	Place	Age	Ref
60 kg
Snatch	122 kg	Yiğit Erdoğan	Turkey	2 May 2026	World Junior Championships	Ismailia, Egypt	17 years, 289 days	
Snatch	123 kg	Yiğit Erdoğan	Turkey	12 October 2026	European Junior Championships	Durrës, Albania	18 years, 87 days	
Snatch	124 kg	Yiğit Erdoğan	Turkey	27 October 2026	World Championships	Ningbo, China	18 years, 102 days	
Clean & Jerk	154 kg	Burak Aykun	Turkey	2 May 2026	World Junior Championships	Ismailia, Egypt	19 years, 222 days	
Clean & Jerk	155 kg	Ramazan Efe Yılmaz	Turkey	12 October 2026	European Junior Championships	Durrës, Albania	18 years, 31 days	
Total	273 kg	Burak Aykun	Turkey	2 May 2026	World Junior Championships	Ismailia, Egypt	19 years, 222 days	
Total	275 kg	Yiğit Erdoğan	Turkey	12 October 2026	European Junior Championships	Durrës, Albania	18 years, 87 days	
Total	277 kg	Yiğit Erdoğan	Turkey	27 October 2026	World Championships	Ningbo, China	18 years, 102 days	
65 kg
Snatch	137 kg	EWF Standard						
Clean & Jerk	161 kg	EWF Standard						
Total	296 kg	EWF Standard						
70 kg
Snatch	141 kg	EWF Standard						
Clean & Jerk	169 kg	EWF Standard						
Total	308 kg	EWF Standard						
75 kg
Snatch	145 kg	EWF Standard						
Snatch	146 kg	Narek Grigoryan	Armenia	14 October 2026	European Junior Championships	Durrës, Albania	19 years, 32 days	
Clean & Jerk	175 kg	EWF Standard						
Clean & Jerk	176 kg	Narek Grigoryan	Armenia	14 October 2026	European Junior Championships	Durrës, Albania	19 years, 32 days	
Total	320 kg	EWF Standard						
Total	322 kg	Narek Grigoryan	Armenia	14 October 2026	European Junior Championships	Durrës, Albania	19 years, 32 days	
85 kg
Snatch	153 kg	EWF Standard						
Snatch	158 kg	Brayan Ibanez	Kosovo	16 October 2026	European Junior Championships	Durrës, Albania	20 years, 28 days	
Clean & Jerk	187 kg	EWF Standard						
Clean & Jerk	192 kg	Alexandr Baldji	Moldova	16 October 2026	European Junior Championships	Durrës, Albania	19 years, 204 days	
Total	340 kg	EWF Standard						
Total	347 kg	Alexandr Baldji	Moldova	16 October 2026	European Junior Championships	Durrës, Albania	19 years, 204 days	
95 kg
Snatch	166 kg	EWF Standard						
Snatch	167 kg	Goga Jajvani	Georgia	17 October 2026	European Junior Championships	Durrës, Albania	20 years, 283 days	
Snatch	173 kg	Goga Jajvani	Georgia	4 November 2026	World Championships	Ningbo, China	20 years, 301 days	
Clean & Jerk	198 kg	EWF Standard						
Clean & Jerk	202 kg	Goga Jajvani	Georgia	4 November 2026	World Championships	Ningbo, China	20 years, 301 days	
Total	361 kg	EWF Standard						
Total	365 kg	Goga Jajvani	Georgia	17 October 2026	European Junior Championships	Durrës, Albania	20 years, 283 days	
Total	375 kg	Goga Jajvani	Georgia	4 November 2026	World Championships	Ningbo, China	20 years, 301 days	
110 kg
Snatch	175 kg	Simone Abati	Italy	2 September 2026	Mediterranean Games	San Giorgio Ionico, Italy	20 years, 232 days	
Snatch	176 kg	Marcin Ziółkowski	Poland	18 October 2026	European Junior Championships	Durrës, Albania	19 years, 356 days	
Clean & Jerk	204 kg	EWF Standard						
Total	374 kg	Danylo Chyniakov	Ukraine	3 November 2025	European Junior Championships	Durrës, Albania	20 years, 131 days	
Total	377 kg	Marcin Ziółkowski	Poland	18 October 2026	European Junior Championships	Durrës, Albania	19 years, 356 days	
+110 kg
Snatch	173 kg	Georgii Miand	AIN	3 November 2025	European Junior Championships	Durrës, Albania	19 years, 351 days	
Clean & Jerk	213 kg	Georgii Miand	AIN	3 November 2025	European Junior Championships	Durrës, Albania	19 years, 351 days	
Total	386 kg	Georgii Miand	AIN	3 November 2025	European Junior Championships	Durrës, Albania	19 years, 351 days	

=== Women ===
Event	Record	Athlete	Nation	Date	Meet	Place	Age	Ref
49 kg
Snatch	83 kg	EWF Standard						
Clean & Jerk	98 kg	EWF Standard						
Total	180 kg	EWF Standard						
53 kg
Snatch	90 kg	EWF Standard						
Clean & Jerk	110 kg	EWF Standard						
Total	200 kg	EWF Standard						
57 kg
Snatch	93 kg	EWF Standard						
Clean & Jerk	115 kg	EWF Standard						
Total	207 kg	EWF Standard						
61 kg
Snatch	95 kg	EWF Standard						
Clean & Jerk	116 kg	EWF Standard						
Total	210 kg	EWF Standard						
69 kg
Snatch	105 kg	Tuğba Nur Koz	Turkey	5 May 2026	World Junior Championships	Ismailia, Egypt	19 years, 87 days	
Snatch	106 kg	Emily Ibanez	Kosovo	3 November 2026	World Championships	Ningbo, China	15 years, 311 days	
Clean & Jerk	125 kg	Enkileda Carja	Albania	5 May 2026	World Junior Championships	Ismailia, Egypt	18 years, 102 days	
Clean & Jerk	134 kg	Emily Ibanez	Kosovo	3 November 2026	World Championships	Ningbo, China	15 years, 311 days	
Total	229 kg	Enkileda Carja	Albania	5 May 2026	World Junior Championships	Ismailia, Egypt	18 years, 102 days	
Total	240 kg	Emily Ibanez	Kosovo	3 November 2026	World Championships	Ningbo, China	15 years, 311 days	
77 kg
Snatch	113 kg	Janette Ylisoini	Finland	23 April 2026	European Championships	Batumi, Georgia	20 years, 17 days	
Snatch	115 kg	Varvara Kuzminova	Russia	5 November 2026	World Championships	Ningbo, China	18 years, 120 days	
Clean & Jerk	136 kg	Anna Amroyan	Armenia	23 April 2026	European Championships	Batumi, Georgia	19 years, 322 days	
Clean & Jerk	138 kg	Varvara Kuzminova	Russia	5 November 2026	World Championships	Ningbo, China	18 years, 120 days	
Total	247 kg	Janette Ylisoini	Finland	23 April 2026	European Championships	Batumi, Georgia	20 years, 17 days	
Total	253 kg	Varvara Kuzminova	Russia	5 November 2026	World Championships	Ningbo, China	18 years, 120 days	
86 kg
Snatch	111 kg	Mariam Murgvliani	Georgia	7 May 2026	World Junior Championships	Ismailia, Egypt	19 years, 153 days	
Snatch	112 kg	Mariam Murgvliani	Georgia	18 October 2026	European Junior Championships	Durrës, Albania	19 years, 317 days	
Clean & Jerk	144 kg	Emma Poghosyan	Armenia	7 May 2026	World Junior Championships	Ismailia, Egypt	19 years, 254 days	
Total	253 kg	Emma Poghosyan	Armenia	7 May 2026	World Junior Championships	Ismailia, Egypt	19 years, 254 days	
+86 kg
Snatch	111 kg	Fatmagül Çevik	Turkey	3 November 2025	European Junior Championships	Durrës, Albania	20 years, 29 days	
Clean & Jerk	145 kg	Tuana Süren	Turkey	26 April 2026	European Championships	Batumi, Georgia	19 years, 360 days	
Total	256 kg	Tuana Süren	Turkey	26 April 2026	European Championships	Batumi, Georgia	19 years, 360 days	

== Historical records ==
=== Men (2025–2026) ===
Event	Record	Athlete	Nation	Date	Meet	Place	Age	Ref
71 kg
Snatch	145 kg	Tigran Karapetyan	Armenia	30 October 2025	European Junior Championships	Durrës, Albania	20 years, 104 days	
Clean & Jerk	176 kg	Tigran Karapetyan	Armenia	30 October 2025	European Junior Championships	Durrës, Albania	20 years, 104 days	
Total	321 kg	Tigran Karapetyan	Armenia	30 October 2025	European Junior Championships	Durrës, Albania	20 years, 104 days	
79 kg
Snatch	155 kg	Tiberiu Donose	Romania	31 October 2025	European Junior Championships	Durrës, Albania	20 years, 172 days	
Clean & Jerk	189 kg	Ravin Almammadov	Azerbaijan	31 October 2025	European Junior Championships	Durrës, Albania	19 years, 258 days	
Clean & Jerk	190 kg	Ravin Almammadov	Azerbaijan	10 November 2025	Islamic Solidarity Games	Riyadh, Saudi Arabia	19 years, 268 days	
Total	340 kg	Ravin Almammadov	Azerbaijan	31 October 2025	European Junior Championships	Durrës, Albania	19 years, 258 days	
Total	345 kg	Ravin Almammadov	Azerbaijan	10 November 2025	Islamic Solidarity Games	Riyadh, Saudi Arabia	19 years, 268 days	
88 kg
Snatch	156 kg	Erik Guadamud	Spain	10 July 2026	World Youth Championships	Cali, Colombia	16 years, 84 days	
Clean & Jerk	191 kg	Levan Ochigava	Georgia	1 November 2025	European Junior Championships	Durrës, Albania	19 years, 258 days	
Total	345 kg	Levan Ochigava	Georgia	1 November 2025	European Junior Championships	Durrës, Albania	19 years, 258 days	
94 kg
Snatch	167 kg	Goga Jajvani	Georgia	7 May 2026	World Junior Championships	Ismailia, Egypt	20 years, 120 days	
Clean & Jerk	200 kg	Goga Jajvani	Georgia	7 May 2026	World Junior Championships	Ismailia, Egypt	20 years, 120 days	
Total	367 kg	Goga Jajvani	Georgia	7 May 2026	World Junior Championships	Ismailia, Egypt	20 years, 120 days	

=== Men (2018–2025) ===
Event	Record	Athlete	Nation	Date	Meet	Place	Age	Ref
55 kg
Snatch	113 kg	EWF Standard						
Clean & Jerk	147 kg	Angel Rusev	Bulgaria	4 April 2021	European Championships	Moscow, Russia	19 years, 265 days	
Total	258 kg	Angel Rusev	Bulgaria	4 April 2021	European Championships	Moscow, Russia	19 years, 265 days	
61 kg
Snatch	135 kg	Ivan Dimov	Bulgaria	29 May 2022	European Championships	Tirana, Albania	19 years, 176 days	
Clean & Jerk	163 kg	Gabriel Marinov	Bulgaria	6 September 2023	World Championships	Riyadh, Saudi Arabia	19 years, 255 days	
Total	293 kg	Sergio Massidda	Italy	7 December 2022	World Championships	Bogotá, Colombia	20 years, 315 days	
67 kg
Snatch	148 kg	Kaan Kahriman	Turkey	8 December 2024	World Championships	Manama, Bahrain	19 years, 365 days	
Clean & Jerk	182 kg	Yusuf Fehmi Genç	Turkey	9 December 2022	World Championships	Bogotá, Colombia	20 years, 200 days	
Total	323 kg	Muhammed Furkan Özbek	Turkey	5 April 2021	European Championships	Moscow, Russia	20 years, 71 days	
73 kg
Snatch	152 kg	Marin Robu	Moldova	27 January 2020	World Cup	Rome, Italy	19 years, 314 days	
Clean & Jerk	181 kg	Muhammed Furkan Özbek	Turkey	21 October 2019	European Junior Championships	Bucharest, Romania	18 years, 270 days	
Total	332 kg	Marin Robu	Moldova	27 January 2020	World Cup	Rome, Italy	19 years, 314 days	
81 kg
Snatch	166 kg	Karlos Nasar	Bulgaria	12 December 2021	World Championships	Tashkent, Uzbekistan	17 years, 214 days	
Clean & Jerk	208 kg	Karlos Nasar	Bulgaria	12 December 2021	World Championships	Tashkent, Uzbekistan	17 years, 214 days	
Total	374 kg	Karlos Nasar	Bulgaria	12 December 2021	World Championships	Tashkent, Uzbekistan	17 years, 214 days	
89 kg
Snatch	183 kg	Karlos Nasar	Bulgaria	11 December 2024	World Championships	Manama, Bahrain	20 years, 213 days	
Clean & Jerk	224 kg	Karlos Nasar	Bulgaria	9 August 2024	Olympic Games	Paris, France	20 years, 89 days	
Total	405 kg	Karlos Nasar	Bulgaria	11 December 2024	World Championships	Manama, Bahrain	20 years, 213 days	
96 kg
Snatch	180 kg	Yauheni Tsikhantsou	Belarus	7 November 2018	World Championships	Ashgabat, Turkmenistan	20 years, 3 days	
Clean & Jerk	210 kg	Yauheni Tsikhantsou	Belarus	7 November 2018	World Championships	Ashgabat, Turkmenistan	20 years, 3 days	
Total	390 kg	Yauheni Tsikhantsou	Belarus	7 November 2018	World Championships	Ashgabat, Turkmenistan	20 years, 3 days	
102 kg
Snatch	183 kg	Garik Karapetyan	Armenia	14 September 2023	World Championships	Riyadh, Saudi Arabia	20 years, 95 days	
Clean & Jerk	214 kg	Garik Karapetyan	Armenia	22 April 2023	European Championships	Yerevan, Armenia	19 years, 315 days	
Total	393 kg	Garik Karapetyan	Armenia	14 September 2023	World Championships	Riyadh, Saudi Arabia	20 years, 95 days	
109 kg
Snatch	195 kg	Bohdan Hoza	Ukraine	9 May 2022	Junior World Championships	Heraklion, Greece	20 years, 117 days	
Clean & Jerk	220 kg	Hristo Hristov	Bulgaria	10 April 2021	European Championships	Moscow, Russia	19 years, 348 days	
Total	410 kg	Bohdan Hoza	Ukraine	9 May 2022	Junior World Championships	Heraklion, Greece	20 years, 117 days	
+109 kg
Snatch	194 kg	Varazdat Lalayan	Armenia	26 October 2019	European Junior Championships	Bucharest, Romania	20 years, 178 days	
Clean & Jerk	234 kg	Enzo Kuworge	Netherlands	4 August 2021	Olympic Games	Tokyo, Japan	19 years, 338 days	
Total	424 kg	Varazdat Lalayan	Armenia	26 October 2019	European Junior Championships	Bucharest, Romania	20 years, 178 days	

=== Men (1998–2018) ===
Event	Record	Athlete	Nation	Date	Meet	Place	Age	Ref
–56 kg
Snatch								
Clean & Jerk								
Total								
–62 kg
Snatch	138 kg	Ivaylo Filev	Bulgaria	19 September 2007	World Championships	Chiang Mai, Thailand	20 years, 141 days	
Clean & Jerk	167 kg	Sergey Petrosyan	Russia	15 April 2008	European Championships	Lignano Sabbiadoro, Italy	19 years, 313 days	
Total	302 kg	Sergey Petrosyan	Russia	15 April 2008	European Championships	Lignano Sabbiadoro, Italy	19 years, 313 days	
–69 kg
Snatch	158 kg WJR	Tigran G. Martirosyan	Armenia	17 April 2008	European Championships	Lignano Sabbiadoro, Italy	19 years, 313 days	
Clean & Jerk	189 kg	Răzvan Martin	Romania	16 June 2010	World Junior Championships	Sofia, Bulgaria	18 years, 176 days	
Total	346 kg WJR	Tigran G. Martirosyan	Armenia	17 April 2008	European Championships	Lignano Sabbiadoro, Italy	19 years, 313 days	
–77 kg
Snatch	172 kg WJR	Taner Sağır	Turkey	19 August 2004	Olympic Games	Athens, Greece	19 years, 159 days	
Clean & Jerk	202 kg WJR	Taner Sağır	Turkey	19 August 2004	Olympic Games	Athens, Greece	19 years, 159 days	
Total	375 kg WJR	Taner Sağır	Turkey	19 August 2004	Olympic Games	Athens, Greece	19 years, 159 days	
–85 kg
Snatch	182 kg WJR	Andrei Rybakou	Belarus	2 June 2002	World Junior Championships	Havířov, Czech Republic	20 years, 90 days	
Clean & Jerk	212 kg	Apti Aukhadov	Russia	15 April 2011	European Championships	Kazan, Russia	18 years, 148 days	
Total	385 kg	Apti Aukhadov	Russia	15 April 2011	European Championships	Kazan, Russia	18 years, 148 days	
–94 kg
Snatch	185 kg WJR	Khadzhimurat Akkayev	Russia	29 May 2004	World Junior Championships	Minsk, Belarus	19 years, 67 days	
Clean & Jerk	232 kg WJR	Szymon Kołecki	Poland	29 April 2000	European Championships	Sofia, Bulgaria	18 years, 212 days	
Total	412 kg WJR	Szymon Kołecki	Poland	29 April 2000	European Championships	Sofia, Bulgaria	18 years, 212 days	
–105 kg
Snatch	200 kg WJR	Andrei Aramnau	Belarus	18 August 2008	Olympic Games	Beijing, China	20 years, 123 days	
Clean & Jerk	236 kg WJR	Andrei Aramnau	Belarus	18 August 2008	Olympic Games	Beijing, China	20 years, 123 days	
Total	436 kg WJR	Andrei Aramnau	Belarus	18 August 2008	Olympic Games	Beijing, China	20 years, 123 days	
+105 kg
Snatch	197 kg	Evgeny Pisarev	Russia	20 September 2008	European Junior Championships	Durrës, Albania	20 years, 34 days	
Clean & Jerk	240 kg	Artem Udachyn	Ukraine	9 July 2000	World Junior Championships	Prague, Czech Republic	20 years, 105 days	
Total	432 kg	Ruben Aleksanyan	Armenia	11 April 2010	European Championships	Minsk, Belarus	20 years, 28 days	

=== Women (2025–2026) ===
Event	Record	Athlete	Nation	Date	Meet	Place	Age	Ref
48 kg
Snatch	83 kg	EWF Standard						
Clean & Jerk	98 kg	EWF Standard						
Total	180 kg	EWF Standard						
58 kg
Snatch	97 kg	EWF Standard						
Clean & Jerk	123 kg	Aleksandra Grigoryan	Armenia	29 October 2025	European Junior Championships	Durrës, Albania	20 years, 294 days	
Total	214 kg	Aleksandra Grigoryan	Armenia	29 October 2025	European Junior Championships	Durrës, Albania	20 years, 294 days	
63 kg
Snatch	98 kg	EWF Standard						
Clean & Jerk	118 kg	EWF Standard						
Total	216 kg	EWF Standard						

=== Women (2018–2025) ===
Event	Record	Athlete	Nation	Date	Meet	Place	Age	Ref
45 kg
Snatch	75 kg	Cansu Bektaş	Turkey	4 September 2023	World Championships	Riyadh, Saudi Arabia	19 years, 285 days	
Clean & Jerk	91 kg	Gamze Altun	Turkey	15 November 2023	World Junior Championships	Guadalajara, Mexico	20 years, 109 days	
Total	163 kg	Cansu Bektaş	Turkey	15 November 2023	World Junior Championships	Guadalajara, Mexico	19 years, 357 days	
49 kg
Snatch	90 kg	Mihaela Cambei	Romania	6 December 2022	World Championships	Bogotá, Colombia	20 years, 18 days	
Clean & Jerk	104 kg	Nina Sterckx	Belgium	6 December 2022	World Championships	Bogotá, Colombia	20 years, 133 days	
Total	194 kg	Mihaela Cambei	Romania	6 December 2022	World Championships	Bogotá, Colombia	20 years, 18 days	
55 kg
Snatch	96 kg	Kamila Konotop	Ukraine	24 May 2021	World Junior Championships	Tashkent, Uzbekistan	20 years, 62 days	
Clean & Jerk	120 kg	Aleksandra Grigoryan	Armenia	8 December 2024	World Championships	Manama, Bahrain	19 years, 129 days	
Total	213 kg	Nina Sterckx	Belgium	17 October 2022	European Junior Championships	Durrës, Albania	20 years, 83 days	
59 kg
Snatch	103 kg	Rebeka Koha	Latvia	4 November 2018	World Championships	Ashgabat, Turkmenistan	20 years, 169 days	
Clean & Jerk	124 kg	Rebeka Koha	Latvia	4 November 2018	World Championships	Ashgabat, Turkmenistan	20 years, 169 days	
Total	227 kg	Rebeka Koha	Latvia	4 November 2018	World Championships	Ashgabat, Turkmenistan	20 years, 169 days	
64 kg
Snatch	101 kg	EWF Standard						
Clean & Jerk	124 kg	EWF Standard						
Total	223 kg	EWF Standard						
71 kg
Snatch	110 kg	Giulia Miserendino	Italy	12 December 2022	World Championships	Bogotá, Colombia	20 years, 171 days	
Clean & Jerk	134 kg	EWF Standard						
Total	240 kg	EWF Standard						
76 kg
Snatch	114 kg	EWF Standard						
Clean & Jerk	140 kg	EWF Standard						
Total	250 kg	EWF Standard						
81 kg
Snatch	118 kg	EWF Standard						
Clean & Jerk	145 kg	EWF Standard						
Total	259 kg	EWF Standard						
87 kg
Snatch	122 kg	EWF Standard						
Clean & Jerk	150 kg	EWF Standard						
Total	269 kg	EWF Standard						
+87 kg
Snatch	129 kg	EWF Standard						
Clean & Jerk	158 kg	EWF Standard						
Total	285 kg	EWF Standard						

=== Women (1998–2018) ===
Event	Record	Athlete	Nation	Date	Meet	Place	Age	Ref
–48 kg
Snatch	88 kg	Genny Pagliaro	Italy	14 April 2008	European Championships	Lignano Sabbiadoro, Italy	19 years, 182 days	
Clean & Jerk								
Total								
–53 kg
Snatch								
Clean & Jerk								
Total								
–58 kg
Snatch	108 kg	Svetlana Tsarukayeva	Russia	3 October 2006	World Championships	Santo Domingo, Dominican Republic	18 years, 282 days	
Clean & Jerk	135 kg	Marina Shainova	Russia	3 May 2006	European Championships	Władysławowo, Poland	19 years, 50 days	
Total	237 kg	Marina Shainova	Russia	3 May 2006	European Championships	Władysławowo, Poland	19 years, 50 days	
–63 kg
Snatch	115 kg WJR	Svetlana Tsarukayeva	Russia	23 September 2007	World Championships	Chiang Mai, Thailand	19 years, 272 days	
Clean & Jerk	135 kg	Meline Daluzyan	Armenia	18 April 2007	European Championships	Strasbourg, France	18 years, 363 days	
Total	250 kg WJR	Svetlana Tsarukayeva	Russia	23 September 2007	World Championships	Chiang Mai, Thailand	19 years, 272 days	
–69 kg
Snatch	123 kg WJR	Oksana Slivenko	Russia	4 October 2006	World Championships	Santo Domingo, Dominican Republic	19 years, 288 days	
Clean & Jerk	157 kg	Zarema Kasayeva	Russia	13 November 2005	World Championships	Doha, Qatar	18 years, 261 days	
Total	275 kg	Zarema Kasayeva	Russia	13 November 2005	World Championships	Doha, Qatar	18 years, 261 days	
–75 kg
Snatch	130 kg WJR	Natalia Zabolotnaya	Russia	13 November 2005	World Championships	Doha, Qatar	20 years, 90 days	
Clean & Jerk	158 kg	Svetlana Podobedova	Russia	2 June 2006	World Junior Championships	Hangzhou, China	20 years, 8 days	
Total	286 kg WJR	Svetlana Podobedova	Russia	2 June 2006	World Junior Championships	Hangzhou, China	20 years, 8 days	
–90 kg
Snatch	125 kg WJR	Tatiana Kashirina	Russia	11 April 2009	European Championships	Bucharest, Romania	18 years, 77 days	
Clean & Jerk	155 kg WJR	Tatiana Kashirina	Russia	11 April 2009	European Championships	Bucharest, Romania	18 years, 77 days	
Total	280 kg WJR	Tatiana Kashirina	Russia	11 April 2009	European Championships	Bucharest, Romania	18 years, 77 days	
+90 kg
Snatch	148 kg WJR	Tatiana Kashirina	Russia	18 December 2011	President's Cup	Belgorod, Russia	20 years, 328 days	
Clean & Jerk	181 kg WJR	Tatiana Kashirina	Russia	17 April 2011	European Championships	Kazan, Russia	20 years, 83 days	
Total	327 kg WJR	Tatiana Kashirina	Russia	17 April 2011	European Championships	Kazan, Russia	20 years, 83 days	
