= List of European records in Olympic weightlifting =

The following are the European records in Olympic weightlifting. Records are maintained in each weight class for the snatch lift, clean and jerk lift, and the total for both lifts by the European Weightlifting Federation (EWF).

== Current records ==
Key to tables: Awaiting ratification Not ratified or later rescinded by EWF

=== Men ===
| Event | Record | Athlete | Nation | Date | Meet | Place | Ref |
60 kg
| Snatch | 130 kg | EWF Standard | | | | | |
| Clean & Jerk | 156 kg | EWF Standard | | | | | |
| Total | 284 kg | EWF Standard | | | | | |
65 kg
| Snatch | 145 kg | Muhammed Furkan Özbek | Turkey | 4 October 2025 | World Championships | Førde, Norway | |
| Snatch | 147 kg | Muhammed Furkan Özbek | Turkey | 28 October 2026 | World Championships | Ningbo, China | |
| Clean & Jerk | 180 kg | Muhammed Furkan Özbek | Turkey | 20 April 2026 | European Championships | Batumi, Georgia | |
| Clean & Jerk | 183 kg | Muhammed Furkan Özbek | Turkey | 28 October 2026 | World Championships | Ningbo, China | |
| Total | 324 kg | Muhammed Furkan Özbek | Turkey | 4 October 2025 | World Championships | Førde, Norway | |
| Total | 330 kg | Muhammed Furkan Özbek | Turkey | 28 October 2026 | World Championships | Ningbo, China | |
70 kg
| Snatch | 150 kg | EWF Standard | | | | | |
| Clean & Jerk | 187 kg | EWF Standard | | | | | |
| Total | 330 kg | EWF Standard | | | | | |
75 kg
| Snatch | 154 kg | EWF Standard | | | | | |
| Clean & Jerk | 192 kg | EWF Standard | | | | | |
| Total | 343 kg | EWF Standard | | | | | |
85 kg
| Snatch | 165 kg | EWF Standard | | | | | |
| Snatch | 176 kg | Marin Robu | Moldova | 2 November 2026 | World Championships | Ningbo, China | |
| Clean & Jerk | 200 kg | EWF Standard | | | | | |
| Clean & Jerk | 201 kg | Zurab Mskhaladze | Georgia | 2 November 2026 | World Championships | Ningbo, China | |
| Total | 364 kg | EWF Standard | | | | | |
| Total | 373 kg | Marin Robu | Moldova | 2 November 2026 | World Championships | Ningbo, China | |
95 kg
| Snatch | 174 kg | EWF Standard | | | | | |
| Snatch | 185 kg | Karlos Nasar | Bulgaria | 4 November 2026 | World Championships | Ningbo, China | |
| Clean & Jerk | 213 kg | EWF Standard | | | | | |
| Clean & Jerk | 230 kg | Karlos Nasar | Bulgaria | 4 November 2026 | World Championships | Ningbo, China | |
| Total | 388 kg | EWF Standard | | | | | |
| Total | 415 kg | Karlos Nasar | Bulgaria | 4 November 2026 | World Championships | Ningbo, China | |
110 kg
| Snatch | 195 kg | Luis Lauret | Romania | 25 April 2026 | European Championships | Batumi, Georgia | |
| Clean & Jerk | 230 kg | EWF Standard | | | | | |
| Total | 416 kg | EWF Standard | | | | | |
+110 kg
| Snatch | 214 kg | EWF Standard | | | | | |
| Clean & Jerk | 250 kg | EWF Standard | | | | | |
| Total | 462 kg | EWF Standard | | | | | |

=== Women ===
| Event | Record | Athlete | Nation | Date | Meet | Place | Ref |
49 kg
| Snatch | 83 kg | EWF Standard | | | | | |
| Clean & Jerk | 100 kg | EWF Standard | | | | | |
| Total | 181 kg | EWF Standard | | | | | |
53 kg
| Snatch | 95 kg | Mihaela Cambei | Romania | 19 April 2026 | European Championships | Batumi, Georgia | |
| Snatch | 95 kg | Mihaela Cambei | Romania | 28 October 2025 | European U23 Championships | Durrës, Albania | |
| Clean & Jerk | 116 kg | Nina Sterckx | Belgium | 19 April 2026 | European Championships | Batumi, Georgia | |
| Total | 210 kg | Nina Sterckx | Belgium | 19 April 2026 | European Championships | Batumi, Georgia | |
57 kg
| Snatch | 96 kg | EWF Standard | | | | | |
| Clean & Jerk | 119 kg | EWF Standard | | | | | |
| Total | 214 kg | EWF Standard | | | | | |
61 kg
| Snatch | 100 kg | EWF Standard | | | | | |
| Clean & Jerk | 124 kg | EWF Standard | | | | | |
| Total | 223 kg | EWF Standard | | | | | |
69 kg
| Snatch | 112 kg | EWF Standard | | | | | |
| Clean & Jerk | 133 kg | EWF Standard | | | | | |
| Clean & Jerk | 136 kg | Siuzanna Valodzka | Belarus | 3 November 2026 | World Championships | Ningbo, China | |
| Total | 245 kg | EWF Standard | | | | | |
77 kg
| Snatch | 115 kg | EWF Standard | | | | | |
| Clean & Jerk | 141 kg | EWF Standard | | | | | |
| Total | 257 kg | EWF Standard | | | | | |
86 kg
| Snatch | 120 kg | Solfrid Koanda | Norway | 9 October 2025 | World Championships | Førde, Norway | |
| Clean & Jerk | 152 kg | Solfrid Koanda | Norway | 9 October 2025 | World Championships | Førde, Norway | |
| Total | 272 kg | Solfrid Koanda | Norway | 9 October 2025 | World Championships | Førde, Norway | |
+86 kg
| Snatch | 119 kg | EWF Standard | | | | | |
| Clean & Jerk | 159 kg | Emily Campbell | Great Britain | 26 April 2026 | European Championships | Batumi, Georgia | |
| Clean & Jerk | 163 kg | Emily Campbell | Great Britain | 30 July 2026 | Commonwealth Games | Glasgow, United Kingdom | |
| Total | 276 kg | Emily Campbell | Great Britain | 26 April 2026 | European Championships | Batumi, Georgia | |
| Total | 278 kg | Emily Campbell | Great Britain | 30 July 2026 | Commonwealth Games | Glasgow, United Kingdom | |

== Historical records ==
=== Men (2025–2026) ===
| Event | Record | Athlete | Nation | Date | Meet | Place | Ref |
71 kg
| Snatch | 154 kg | Gor Sahakyan | Armenia | 5 October 2025 | World Championships | Førde, Norway | |
| Clean & Jerk | 192 kg | Yusuf Fehmi Genç | Turkey | 5 October 2025 | World Championships | Førde, Norway | |
| Total | 343 kg | Yusuf Fehmi Genç | Turkey | 5 October 2025 | World Championships | Førde, Norway | |
79 kg
| Snatch | 161 kg | Gevorg Serobian | AIN | 22 April 2026 | European Championships | Batumi, Georgia | |
| Clean & Jerk | 189 kg | EWF Standard | | | | | |
| Clean & Jerk | 190 kg | Ravin Almammadov | Azerbaijan | 10 November 2025 | Islamic Solidarity Games | Riyadh, Saudi Arabia | |
| Total | 341 kg | EWF Standard | | | | | |
| Total | 345 kg | Ravin Almammadov | Azerbaijan | 10 November 2025 | Islamic Solidarity Games | Riyadh, Saudi Arabia | |
88 kg
| Snatch | 173 kg | Marin Robu | Moldova | 23 April 2026 | European Championships | Batumi, Georgia | |
| Clean & Jerk | 213 kg | EWF Standard | | | | | |
| Total | 383 kg | EWF Standard | | | | | |
94 kg
| Snatch | 177 kg | EWF Standard | | | | | |
| Clean & Jerk | 222 kg | Karlos Nasar | Bulgaria | 9 October 2025 | World Championships | Førde, Norway | |
| Total | 395 kg | Karlos Nasar | Bulgaria | 9 October 2025 | World Championships | Førde, Norway | |

=== Men (2018–2025) ===
| Event | Record | Athlete | Nation | Date | Meet | Place | Ref |
55 kg
| Snatch | 133 kg | EWF Standard | | | | | |
| Clean & Jerk | 159 kg | EWF Standard | | | | | |
| Total | 291 kg | EWF Standard | | | | | |
61 kg
| Snatch | 142 kg | EWF Standard | | | | | |
| Clean & Jerk | 170 kg | EWF Standard | | | | | |
| Total | 309 kg | EWF Standard | | | | | |
67 kg
| Snatch | 151 kg | EWF Standard | | | | | |
| Clean & Jerk | 182 kg | Yusuf Fehmi Genç | Turkey | 9 December 2022 | World Championships | Bogotá, Colombia | |
| Total | 327 kg | EWF Standard | | | | | |
73 kg
| Snatch | 160 kg | Daniyar İsmayilov | Turkey | 6 April 2021 | European Championships | Moscow, Russia | |
| Clean & Jerk | 194 kg | Yusuf Fehmi Genç | Turkey | 16 April 2025 | European Championships | Chișinău, Moldova | |
| Total | 348 kg | Bozhidar Andreev | Bulgaria | 15 February 2024 | European Championships | Sofia, Bulgaria | |
81 kg
| Snatch | 169 kg | EWF Standard | | | | | |
| Clean & Jerk | 208 kg | Karlos Nasar | Bulgaria | 12 December 2021 | World Championships | Tashkent, Uzbekistan | |
| Total | 374 kg | Karlos Nasar | Bulgaria | 12 December 2021 | World Championships | Tashkent, Uzbekistan | |
89 kg
| Snatch | 183 kg WR | Karlos Nasar | Bulgaria | 11 December 2024 | World Championships | Manama, Bahrain | |
| Clean & Jerk | 224 kg WR | Karlos Nasar | Bulgaria | 9 August 2024 | Olympic Games | Paris, France | |
| Total | 405 kg WR | Karlos Nasar | Bulgaria | 11 December 2024 | World Championships | Manama, Bahrain | |
96 kg
| Snatch | 188 kg WR | Karlos Nasar | Bulgaria | 19 April 2025 | European Championships | Chișinău, Moldova | |
| Clean & Jerk | 229 kg | Karlos Nasar | Bulgaria | 19 April 2025 | European Championships | Chișinău, Moldova | |
| Total | 417 kg WR | Karlos Nasar | Bulgaria | 19 April 2025 | European Championships | Chișinău, Moldova | |
102 kg
| Snatch | 190 kg | EWF Standard | | | | | |
| Clean & Jerk | 228 kg | EWF Standard | | | | | |
| Total | 406 kg | EWF Standard | | | | | |
109 kg
| Snatch | 199 kg | Simon Martirosyan | Armenia | 26 September 2019 | World Championships | Pattaya, Thailand | |
| Clean & Jerk | 240 kg | Simon Martirosyan | Armenia | 9 November 2018 | World Championships | Ashgabat, Turkmenistan | |
| Total | 435 kg WR | Simon Martirosyan | Armenia | 9 November 2018 | World Championships | Ashgabat, Turkmenistan | |
+109 kg
| Snatch | 225 kg WR | Lasha Talakhadze | Georgia | 17 December 2021 | World Championships | Tashkent, Uzbekistan | |
| Clean & Jerk | 267 kg WR | Lasha Talakhadze | Georgia | 17 December 2021 | World Championships | Tashkent, Uzbekistan | |
| Total | 492 kg WR | Lasha Talakhadze | Georgia | 17 December 2021 | World Championships | Tashkent, Uzbekistan | |

=== Men (1998–2018) ===
| Event | Record | Athlete | Nation | Date | Meet | Place | Ref |
56 kg
| Snatch | 138 kg | Halil Mutlu | Turkey | 4 November 2001 | World Championships | Antalya, Turkey | |
| Clean & Jerk | 168 kg | Halil Mutlu | Turkey | 24 April 2001 | European Championships | Trenčín, Slovakia | |
| Total | 305 kg | Halil Mutlu | Turkey | 16 September 2000 | Olympic Games | Sydney, Australia | |
62 kg
| Snatch | 150 kg | Nikolaj Pešalov | Croatia | 17 September 2000 | Olympic Games | Sydney, Australia | |
| Clean & Jerk | 181 kg | Gennady Oleshchuk | Belarus | 5 November 2001 | World Championships | Antalya, Turkey | |
| Total | 325 kg | Nikolaj Pešalov | Croatia | 26 April 2000 | European Championships | Sofia, Bulgaria | |
69 kg
| Snatch | 165 kg | Georgi Markov | Bulgaria | 20 September 2000 | Olympic Games | Sydney, Australia | |
| Clean & Jerk | 196 kg | Galabin Boevski | Bulgaria | 20 September 2000 | Olympic Games | Sydney, Australia | |
| Total | 357 kg | Galabin Boevski | Bulgaria | 24 November 1999 | World Championships | Athens, Greece | |
77 kg
| Snatch | 174 kg | Andranik Karapetyan | Armenia | 10 August 2016 | Olympic Games | Rio de Janeiro, Brazil | |
| Clean & Jerk | 210 kg | Oleg Perepetchenov | Russia | 27 April 2001 | European Championships | Trenčín, Slovakia | |
| Total | 377 kg | Plamen Zhelyazkov | Bulgaria | 27 March 2002 | | Doha, Qatar | |
85 kg
| Snatch | 187 kg | Andrei Rybakou | Belarus | 22 September 2007 | World Championships | Chiang Mai, Thailand | |
| Clean & Jerk | 217 kg | Zlatan Vanev | Bulgaria | 23 November 2002 | World Championships | Warsaw, Poland | |
| Total | 394 kg | Andrei Rybakou | Belarus | 15 August 2008 | Olympic Games | Beijing, China | |
94 kg
| Snatch | 188 kg | Akakios Kakiasvilis | Greece | 27 November 1999 | World Championships | Athens, Greece | |
| Clean & Jerk | 232 kg | Szymon Kołecki | Poland | 29 April 2000 | European Championships | Sofia, Bulgaria | |
| Total | 412 kg | Akakios Kakiasvilis | Greece | 27 November 1999 | World Championships | Athens, Greece | |
105 kg
| Snatch | 200 kg | Andrei Aramnau | Belarus | 18 August 2008 | Olympic Games | Beijing, China | |
| Clean & Jerk | 240 kg | David Bedzhanyan | Russia | 15 November 2014 | World Championships | Almaty, Kazakhstan | |
| Total | 436 kg | Andrei Aramnau | Belarus | 18 August 2008 | Olympic Games | Beijing, China | |
+105 kg
| Snatch | 220 kg | Lasha Talakhadze | Georgia | 5 December 2017 | World Championships | Anaheim, United States | |
| Clean & Jerk | 260 kg | Ronny Weller | Germany | 3 May 1998 | European Championships | Riesa, Germany | |
| Total | 477 kg | Lasha Talakhadze | Georgia | 5 December 2017 | World Championships | Anaheim, United States | |

=== Women (2025–2026) ===
| Event | Record | Athlete | Nation | Date | Meet | Place | Ref |
48 kg
| Snatch | 88 kg | EWF Standard | | | | | |
| Clean & Jerk | 107 kg | EWF Standard | | | | | |
| Total | 194 kg | EWF Standard | | | | | |
58 kg
| Snatch | 100 kg | EWF Standard | | | | | |
| Clean & Jerk | 123 kg | EWF Standard | | | | | |
| Total | 224 kg | EWF Standard | | | | | |
63 kg
| Snatch | 108 kg | EWF Standard | | | | | |
| Clean & Jerk | 129 kg | EWF Standard | | | | | |
| Total | 235 kg | EWF Standard | | | | | |

=== Women (2018–2025) ===
| Event | Record | Athlete | Nation | Date | Meet | Place | Ref |
45 kg
| Snatch | 82 kg | EWF Standard | | | | | |
| Clean & Jerk | 105 kg | EWF Standard | | | | | |
| Total | 183 kg | EWF Standard | | | | | |
49 kg
| Snatch | 93 kg | Mihaela Cambei | Romania | 7 August 2024 | Olympic Games | Paris, France | |
| Clean & Jerk | 112 kg | EWF Standard | | | | | |
| Total | 205 kg | Mihaela Cambei | Romania | 7 August 2024 | Olympic Games | Paris, France | |
55 kg
| Snatch | 98 kg | EWF Standard | | | | | |
| Clean & Jerk | 122 kg | EWF Standard | | | | | |
| Clean & Jerk | 123 kg | Cristina Iovu | Romania | 3 November 2018 | World Championships | Ashgabat, Turkmenistan | |
| Total | 216 kg | EWF Standard | | | | | |
| Total | 220 kg | Cristina Iovu | Romania | 3 November 2018 | World Championships | Ashgabat, Turkmenistan | |
59 kg
| Snatch | 107 kg | Kamila Konotop | Ukraine | 28 July 2023 | European U23 Championships | Bucharest, Romania | |
| Clean & Jerk | 130 kg | Kamila Konotop | Ukraine | 28 July 2023 | European U23 Championships | Bucharest, Romania | |
| Total | 237 kg | Kamila Konotop | Ukraine | 28 July 2023 | European U23 Championships | Bucharest, Romania | |
64 kg
| Snatch | 114 kg | Loredana Toma | Romania | 6 April 2021 | European Championships | Moscow, Russia | |
| Clean & Jerk | 136 kg | Loredana Toma | Romania | 29 January 2020 | World Cup | Rome, Italy | |
| Total | 249 kg | Loredana Toma | Romania | 29 January 2020 | World Cup | Rome, Italy | |
71 kg
| Snatch | 119 kg | Loredana Toma | Romania | 12 December 2022 | World Championships | Bogotá, Colombia | |
| Clean & Jerk | 145 kg | EWF Standard | | | | | |
| Total | 260 kg | EWF Standard | | | | | |
76 kg
| Snatch | 123 kg | EWF Standard | | | | | |
| Clean & Jerk | 151 kg | EWF Standard | | | | | |
| Total | 272 kg | EWF Standard | | | | | |
81 kg
| Snatch | 128 kg | EWF Standard | | | | | |
| Clean & Jerk | 157 kg | EWF Standard | | | | | |
| Total | 282 kg | EWF Standard | | | | | |
87 kg
| Snatch | 132 kg | EWF Standard | | | | | |
| Clean & Jerk | 163 kg | EWF Standard | | | | | |
| Total | 294 kg | EWF Standard | | | | | |
+87 kg
| Snatch | 146 kg | Tatiana Kashirina | Russia | 13 April 2019 | European Championships | Batumi, Georgia | |
| Clean & Jerk | 185 kg | Tatiana Kashirina | Russia | 10 November 2018 | World Championships | Ashgabat, Turkmenistan | |
| Total | 331 kg | Tatiana Kashirina | Russia | 13 April 2019 | European Championships | Batumi, Georgia | |

=== Women (1998–2018) ===
| Event | Record | Athlete | Nation | Date | Meet | Place | Ref |
48 kg
| Snatch | 97 kg | Nurcan Taylan | Turkey | 14 August 2004 | Olympic Games | Athens, Greece | |
| Clean & Jerk | 121 kg | Nurcan Taylan | Turkey | 17 September 2010 | World Championships | Antalya, Turkey | |
| Total | 214 kg | Nurcan Taylan | Turkey | 17 September 2010 | World Championships | Antalya, Turkey | |
53 kg
| Snatch | 99 kg | Cristina Iovu | Moldova | 29 July 2012 | Olympic Games | London, Great Britain | |
| Clean & Jerk | 126 kg | Aylin Daşdelen | Turkey | 6 November 2011 | World Championships | Paris, France | |
| Total | 219 kg | Aylin Daşdelen | Turkey | 6 November 2011 | World Championships | Paris, France | |
58 kg
| Snatch | 112 kg | Boyanka Kostova | Azerbaijan | 23 November 2015 | World Championships | Houston, United States | |
| Clean & Jerk | 140 kg | Boyanka Kostova | Azerbaijan | 23 November 2015 | World Championships | Houston, United States | |
| Total | 252 kg | Boyanka Kostova | Azerbaijan | 23 November 2015 | World Championships | Houston, United States | |
63 kg
| Snatch | 117 kg | Svetlana Tsarukayeva | Russia | 8 November 2011 | World Championships | Paris, France | |
| Clean & Jerk | 141 kg | Svetlana Shimkova | Russia | 3 May 2006 | European Championships | Władysławowo, Poland | |
| Total | 255 kg | Svetlana Tsarukayeva | Russia | 8 November 2011 | World Championships | Paris, France | |
69 kg
| Snatch | 123 kg | Oksana Slivenko | Russia | 4 October 2006 | World Championships | Santo Dom., Dominican Republic | |
| Clean & Jerk | 157 kg | Zarema Kasayeva | Russia | 13 November 2005 | World Championships | Doha, Qatar | |
| Total | 276 kg | Oksana Slivenko | Russia | 24 September 2007 | World Championships | Chiang Mai, Thailand | |
75 kg
| Snatch | 135 kg | Natalia Zabolotnaya | Russia | 17 December 2011 | President's Cup | Belgorod, Russia | |
| Clean & Jerk | 163 kg | Nadezhda Yevstyukhina | Russia | 10 November 2011 | World Championships | Paris, France | |
| Total | 296 kg | Natalia Zabolotnaya | Russia | 17 December 2011 | President's Cup | Belgorod, Russia | |
90 kg
| Snatch | 130 kg | Viktoriya Shaymardanova | Ukraine | 21 August 2004 | Olympic Games | Athens, Greece | |
| Clean & Jerk | 160 kg | Hripsime Khurshudyan | Armenia | 25 September 2010 | World Championships | Antalya, Turkey | |
| Total | 283 kg | Hripsime Khurshudyan | Armenia | 25 September 2010 | World Championships | Antalya, Turkey | |
+90 kg
| Snatch | 155 kg | Tatiana Kashirina | Russia | 16 November 2014 | World Championships | Almaty, Kazakhstan | |
| Clean & Jerk | 193 kg | Tatiana Kashirina | Russia | 16 November 2014 | World Championships | Almaty, Kazakhstan | |
| Total | 348 kg | Tatiana Kashirina | Russia | 16 November 2014 | World Championships | Almaty, Kazakhstan | |
