= List of Bulgarian records in Olympic weightlifting =

The following are the national records in Olympic weightlifting in Bulgaria. Records are maintained in each weight class for the snatch lift, clean and jerk lift, and the total for both lifts by the Bulgarian Weightlifting Federation.

== Current records ==
=== Men ===
Event	Record	Athlete	Date	Meet	Place	Ref
60 kg
Snatch						
Clean & Jerk	141 kg	Dzhan Zarkov	1 December 2025	Balkan Championships	Durrës, Albania	
Total						
65 kg
Snatch						
Clean & Jerk						
Total						
71 kg
Snatch						
Clean & Jerk						
Total						
79 kg
Snatch						
Clean & Jerk						
Total						
88 kg
Snatch						
Clean & Jerk						
Total						
95 kg
Snatch	185 kg	Karlos Nasar	4 November 2026	World Championships	Ningbo, China	
Clean & Jerk	230 kg	Karlos Nasar	4 November 2026	World Championships	Ningbo, China	
Total	415 kg	Karlos Nasar	4 November 2026	World Championships	Ningbo, China	
110 kg
Snatch						
Clean & Jerk						
Total						
+110 kg
Snatch						
Clean & Jerk						
Total						

=== Women ===
Event	Record	Athlete	Date	Meet	Place	Ref
48 kg
Snatch						
Clean & Jerk						
Total						
53 kg
Snatch						
Clean & Jerk						
Total						
58 kg
Snatch						
Clean & Jerk						
Total						
63 kg
Snatch						
Clean & Jerk						
Total						
69 kg
Snatch						
Clean & Jerk						
Total						
77 kg
Snatch						
Clean & Jerk						
Total						
86 kg
Snatch						
Clean & Jerk						
Total						
+86 kg
Snatch						
Clean & Jerk						
Total						

== Historical records ==
=== Men (2018–2025) ===
Event	Record	Athlete	Date	Meet	Place	Ref
55 kg
Snatch	111 kg	Angel Rusev	4 April 2021	European Championships	Moscow, Russia	
Clean & Jerk	147 kg	Angel Rusev	4 April 2021	European Championships	Moscow, Russia	
Total	258 kg	Angel Rusev	4 April 2021	European Championships	Moscow, Russia	
61 kg
Snatch	136 kg	Stilyan Grozdev	4 April 2021	European Championships	Moscow, Russia	
Clean & Jerk	163 kg	Gabriel Marinov	6 September 2023	World Championships	Riyadh, Saudi Arabia	
Total	296 kg	Stilyan Grozdev	4 April 2021	European Championships	Moscow, Russia	
67 kg
Snatch	140 kg	Ivan Dimov	7 December 2023	IWF Grand Prix	Doha, Qatar	
Clean & Jerk	177 kg	Valentin Genchev	5 April 2021	European Championships	Moscow, Russia	
Total	315 kg	Valentin Genchev	5 April 2021	European Championships	Moscow, Russia	
73 kg
Snatch	157 kg	Bozhidar Andreev	21 September 2019	World Championships	Pattaya, Thailand	
Clean & Jerk	193 kg	Bozhidar Andreev	15 February 2024	European Championships	Sofia, Bulgaria	
Total	348 kg	Bozhidar Andreev	15 February 2024	European Championships	Sofia, Bulgaria	
81 kg
Snatch	166 kg	Karlos Nasar	12 December 2021	World Championships	Tashkent, Uzbekistan	
Clean & Jerk	208 kg	Karlos Nasar	12 December 2021	World Championships	Tashkent, Uzbekistan	
Total	374 kg	Karlos Nasar	12 December 2021	World Championships	Tashkent, Uzbekistan	
89 kg
Snatch	183 kg	Karlos Nasar	11 December 2024	World Championships	Manama, Bahrain	
Clean & Jerk	224 kg	Karlos Nasar	9 August 2024	Olympic Games	Paris, France	
Total	405 kg	Karlos Nasar	11 December 2024	World Championships	Manama, Bahrain	
96 kg
Snatch	188 kg	Karlos Nasar	19 April 2025	European Championships	Chișinău, Moldova	
Clean & Jerk	229 kg	Karlos Nasar	19 April 2025	European Championships	Chișinău, Moldova	
Total	417 kg	Karlos Nasar	19 April 2025	European Championships	Chișinău, Moldova	
102 kg
Snatch	173 kg	Vasil Marinov	19 February 2024	European Championships	Sofia, Bulgaria	
Clean & Jerk	210 kg	David Fischerov	10 April 2021	European Championships	Moscow, Russia	
Total	381 kg	Vasil Marinov	19 February 2024	European Championships	Sofia, Bulgaria	
109 kg
Snatch	189 kg	Hristo Hristov	3 August 2021	Olympic Games	Tokyo, Japan	
Clean & Jerk	220 kg	Hristo Hristov	10 April 2021	European Championships	Moscow, Russia	
Total	408 kg	Hristo Hristov	3 August 2021	Olympic Games	Tokyo, Japan	
+109 kg
Snatch						
Clean & Jerk						
Total						

=== Women (2018–2025) ===
Event	Record	Athlete	Date	Meet	Place	Ref
45 kg
Snatch	72 kg	Nadezhda Nguen	3 April 2021	European Championships	Moscow, Russia	
Clean & Jerk	85 kg	Ivana Petrova	3 April 2021	European Championships	Moscow, Russia	
Total	155 kg	Nadezhda Nguen	3 April 2021	European Championships	Moscow, Russia	
49 kg
Snatch						
Clean & Jerk	75 kg	Magdalena Dimitrova	15 April 2023	European Championships	Yerevan, Armenia	
Total						
55 kg
Snatch	81 kg	Maya Ivanova	4 April 2021	European Championships	Moscow, Russia	
Clean & Jerk	106 kg	Maya Ivanova	4 April 2021	European Championships	Moscow, Russia	
Total	187 kg	Maya Ivanova	4 April 2021	European Championships	Moscow, Russia	
59 kg
Snatch	88 kg	Galya Shatova	17 April 2023	European Championships	Yerevan, Armenia	
Clean & Jerk	105 kg	Galya Shatova	17 April 2023	European Championships	Yerevan, Armenia	
Total	193 kg	Galya Shatova	17 April 2023	European Championships	Yerevan, Armenia	
64 kg
Snatch						
Clean & Jerk						
Total						
71 kg
Snatch	95 kg	Maria Kireva	7 April 2021	European Championships	Moscow, Russia	
Clean & Jerk						
Total						
76 kg
Snatch						
Clean & Jerk						
Total						
81 kg
Snatch						
Clean & Jerk						
Total						
87 kg
Snatch						
Clean & Jerk						
Total						
+87 kg
Snatch	93 kg	Dzhesika Ivanova	23 April 2023	European Championships	Yerevan, Armenia	
Clean & Jerk	121 kg	Dzhesika Ivanova	23 April 2023	European Championships	Yerevan, Armenia	
Total	214 kg	Dzhesika Ivanova	23 April 2023	European Championships	Yerevan, Armenia	

=== Men (1998–2018) ===
Event	Record	Athlete	Date	Meet	Place	Ref
-56 kg
Snatch	130 kg^{1}	Ivan Ivanov	16 September 2000	Olympic Games	Sydney, Australia	
Clean & Jerk	162 kg^{1}	Ivan Ivanov	16 September 2000	Olympic Games	Sydney, Australia	
Total	292 kg^{1}	Ivan Ivanov	16 September 2000	Olympic Games	Sydney, Australia	
-62 kg
Snatch	145 kg	Sevdalin Minchev	26 April 2000	European Championships	Sofia, Bulgaria	
Clean & Jerk	177 kg	Sevdalin Minchev	26 April 2000	European Championships	Sofia, Bulgaria	
Total	322 kg	Sevdalin Minchev	26 April 2000	European Championships	Sofia, Bulgaria	
-69 kg
Snatch	165 kg	Georgi Markov	20 September 2000	Olympic Games	Sydney, Australia	
Clean & Jerk	196 kg	Galabin Boevski	20 September 2000	Olympic Games	Sydney, Australia	
Total	359 kg^{2}	Galabin Boevski	20 September 2000	Olympic Games	Sydney, Australia	
-77 kg
Snatch	172 kg	Plamen Zhelyazkov	26 March 2002	Qatar Grand Prix	Doha, Qatar	
Clean & Jerk	207 kg	Zlatan Vanev	28 April 2000	European Championships	Sofia, Bulgaria	
Total	377 kg	Plamen Zhelyazkov	26 March 2002	Qatar Grand Prix	Doha, Qatar	
-85 kg
Snatch	180 kg	Georgi Gardev	17 April 1999	European Championships	A Coruña, Spain	
Clean & Jerk	220 kg	Ivan Markov	June 2008		Stara Zagora, Bulgaria	
Total	395 kg	Ivan Markov	June 2008		Stara Zagora, Bulgaria	
-94 kg
Snatch	187 kg	Milen Dobrev	23 August 2004	Olympic Games	Athens, Greece	
Clean & Jerk	222 kg	Milen Dobrev	19 April 2003	European Championships	Loutraki, Greece	
Total	407 kg	Milen Dobrev	23 August 2004	Olympic Games	Athens, Greece	
-105 kg
Snatch	190 kg	Alan Tsagaev	5 October 2002	Hungary Grand Prix	Kazincbarcika, Hungary	
Clean & Jerk	237 kg	Alan Tsagaev	25 April 2004	European Championships	Kyiv, Ukraine	
Total	422 kg	Alan Tsagaev	25 September 2000	Olympic Games	Sydney, Australia	
+105 kg
Snatch	207 kg	Damian Damianov	2001		Asenovgrad, Bulgaria	
Clean & Jerk	250 kg	Velichko Cholakov	2003		Haskovo, Bulgaria	
Total	451 kg	Velichko Cholakov	June 2008		Stara Zagora, Bulgaria	

=== Women (1998–2018) ===
Event	Record	Athlete	Date	Meet	Place	Ref
-48 kg
Snatch	85 kg	Donka Mincheva	25 April 2000	European Championships	Sofia, Bulgaria	
Clean and jerk	113 kg	Donka Mincheva	21 November 1999	World Championships	Athens, Greece	
Total	192 kg	Donka Mincheva	21 November 1999	World Championships	Athens, Greece	
-53 kg
Snatch	93 kg	Izabela Dragneva	15 April 2003	European Championships	Loutraki, Greece	
Clean and jerk	113 kg	Izabela Dragneva	15 April 2003	European Championships	Loutraki, Greece	
Total	205 kg	Izabela Dragneva	15 April 2003	European Championships	Loutraki, Greece	
-58 kg
Snatch	92 kg	Donka Mincheva	2002		Shumen, Bulgaria	
Clean and jerk	122 kg	Zlatina Atanasova	21 April 2004	European Championships	Kyiv, Ukraine	
Total	215 kg	Zlatina Atanasova	21 April 2004	European Championships	Kyiv, Ukraine	
-63 kg
Snatch	105 kg	Gergana Kirilova	18 November 2003	World Championships	Vancouver, Canada	
Clean and jerk	131 kg	Milka Maneva	31 July 2012	Olympic Games	London, United Kingdom	
Total	235 kg	Gergana Kirilova	18 November 2003	World Championships	Vancouver, Canada	
-69 kg
Snatch	115 kg	Slaveyka Ruzhinska	19 August 2004	Olympic Games	Athens, Greece	
Clean and jerk	141 kg	Milka Maneva	June 2008		Stara Zagora, Bulgaria	
Total	252 kg	Milka Maneva	June 2008		Stara Zagora, Bulgaria	
-75 kg
Snatch	115 kg	Rumyana Petkova	June 2004		Haskovo, Bulgaria	
Clean and jerk	140 kg	Slaveyka Ruzhinska	20 November 2003	World Championships	Vancouver, Canada	
Total	252 kg	Slaveyka Ruzhinska	20 November 2003	World Championships	Vancouver, Canada	
–90 kg
Snatch	90 kg	Rumyana Stancheva	31 March 2018	European Championships	Bucharest, Romania	
Clean and jerk	107 kg	Rumyana Stancheva	31 March 2018	European Championships	Bucharest, Romania	
Total	197 kg	Rumyana Stancheva	31 March 2018	European Championships	Bucharest, Romania	
+90 kg
Snatch	115 kg	Rumyana Petkova	June 2006		Haskovo, Bulgaria	
Clean and jerk	140 kg	Yordanka Apostolova	21 November 2003	World Championships	Vancouver, Canada	
Total	251 kg	Rumyana Petkova	June 2006		Haskovo, Bulgaria	

- ^1 Ivanov failed the competition doping test and the IOC & IWF canceled the results, the BWF however still lists them as records.
- ^2 Before 2005, the scores in the snatch and the clean and jerk were rounded down to the nearest 2.5 kg. Thus, Boevski's total was recorded as 357.5 kg.
