= 2023 World Weightlifting Championships – Men's 89 kg =

The men's 89 kilograms competition at the 2023 World Weightlifting Championships was held on 10 and 11 September 2023.

== Schedule ==
Date	Time	Event
10 September 2023	09:00	Group E
10 September 2023	11:30	Group D
10 September 2023	21:30	Group C
11 September 2023	14:00	Group B
11 September 2023	19:00	Group A

== Medalists ==
Event	Gold		Silver		Bronze	
Snatch	Andranik Karapetyan (ARM)	175 kg	Marin Robu (MDA)	173 kg	Keydomar Vallenilla (VEN)	171 kg
Clean & Jerk	Mirmostafa Javadi (IRI)	215 kg	Li Dayin (CHN)	213 kg	Keydomar Vallenilla (VEN)	210 kg
Total	Mirmostafa Javadi (IRI)	384 kg	Li Dayin (CHN)	383 kg	Keydomar Vallenilla (VEN)	381 kg

== Records ==
Prior to this competition, the existing world records were as follows.

World Record	Snatch	Li Dayin (CHN)	180 kg	Jinju, South Korea	10 May 2023
World Record	Clean & Jerk	Tian Tao (CHN)	222 kg	Jinju, South Korea	10 May 2023
World Record	Total	Li Dayin (CHN)	396 kg	Jinju, South Korea	10 May 2023

== Results ==
Rank	Athlete	Group	Snatch (kg)				Clean & Jerk (kg)				Total
Rank	Athlete	Group	1	2	3	Rank	1	2	3	Rank	Total
1st place, gold medalist(s)	Mirmostafa Javadi (IRI)	A	~~161~~	162	169	6	207	212	215	1st place, gold medalist(s)	384
2nd place, silver medalist(s)	Li Dayin (CHN)	A	170	~~177~~	~~177~~	4	206	~~213~~	213	2nd place, silver medalist(s)	383
3rd place, bronze medalist(s)	Keydomar Vallenilla (VEN)	A	165	169	171	3rd place, bronze medalist(s)	205	~~209~~	210	3rd place, bronze medalist(s)	381
4	Andranik Karapetyan (ARM)	A	~~170~~	170	175	1st place, gold medalist(s)	192	202	~~207~~	5	377
5	Petr Asayonak (AIN)	A	165	168	170	5	201	~~208~~	~~208~~	7	371
6	Marin Robu (MDA)	A	169	~~173~~	173	2nd place, silver medalist(s)	197	~~205~~	~~205~~	9	370
7	Romain Imadouchène (FRA)	A	160	~~165~~	~~165~~	16	204	209	~~213~~	4	369
8	Nico Müller (GER)	B	157	~~162~~	162	9	195	~~201~~	201	6	363
9	Sergey Petrovich (KAZ)	C	155	160	164	8	~~190~~	190	194	14	358
10	Sarvarbek Zafarjonov (UZB)	B	160	~~164~~	~~164~~	12	191	196	~~203~~	12	356
11	Olfides Sáez (CUB)	C	~~155~~	~~155~~	155	19	~~193~~	193	200	8	355
12	Yu Dong-ju (KOR)	B	155	160	~~164~~	13	~~195~~	~~195~~	195	13	355
13	Artūrs Vasiļonoks (LAT)	B	153	~~157~~	157	17	191	196	~~200~~	11	353
14	Şatlyk Şöhradow (TKM)	B	~~160~~	160	~~164~~	15	191	~~195~~	~~195~~	18	351
15	Alex Bellemarre (CAN)	B	155	160	—	14	190	~~195~~	~~195~~	20	350
16	Braydon Kennedy (CAN)	C	156	160	~~163~~	11	~~187~~	187	~~193~~	23	347
17	Armands Mežinskis (LAT)	B	154	~~159~~	~~160~~	20	~~193~~	193	—	17	347
18	Amur Al-Khanjari (OMA)	B	150	~~155~~	~~155~~	27	196	~~201~~	~~202~~	10	346
19	Maksym Dombrovskyi (UKR)	B	153	156	~~158~~	18	189	~~193~~	~~195~~	21	345
20	Hsieh Meng-en (TPE)	C	150	153	~~155~~	21	~~190~~	~~190~~	190	19	343
21	Phacharamethi Tharaphan (THA)	C	145	~~150~~	~~150~~	32	187	~~194~~	194	15	339
22	Desmond Akano (NGR)	D	145	~~150~~	~~151~~	30	187	193	~~198~~	16	338
23	Emil Moldodosov (KGZ)	D	140	147	152	22	175	180	185	26	337
24	Manuel Sánchez (ESP)	D	~~151~~	~~151~~	151	23	180	186	~~192~~	24	337
25	Clarence Cummings (USA)	C	144	~~149~~	150	26	178	186	~~193~~	25	336
26	Mauricio Canul (MEX)	C	~~145~~	~~145~~	145	34	180	187	~~193~~	22	332
27	Muhammad Zul Ilmi (INA)	C	142	~~147~~	147	28	180	~~185~~	~~185~~	32	327
28	Oliver Saxton (AUS)	E	140	~~145~~	145	29	170	~~180~~	180	28	325
29	Juniel Muñoz (MEX)	D	150	~~155~~	~~155~~	24	175	~~180~~	~~180~~	33	325
30	Leho Pent (EST)	D	142	146	150	25	173	~~178~~	~~180~~	36	323
31	Axel Pavón (HON)	E	~~135~~	135	140	36	170	175	181	27	321
32	Seán Brown (IRL)	D	142	~~145~~	145	31	~~172~~	172	175	34	320
33	Said Alioua (MAR)	D	140	~~145~~	~~145~~	37	180	~~185~~	~~185~~	29	320
34	Ismail Al-Swyleh (KSA)	D	135	~~140~~	140	38	165	170	174	35	314
35	Karol Samko (SVK)	D	~~132~~	~~132~~	132	40	180	~~183~~	~~183~~	30	312
36	Xavier Tiffany (NZL)	E	136	140	~~144~~	35	160	166	~~170~~	37	306
37	Yomar López (PUR)	E	~~133~~	~~133~~	133	39	153	163	~~168~~	38	296
38	Daniel Onana Tanga (CMR)	E	130	~~136~~	~~136~~	41	~~160~~	160	~~170~~	39	290
39	Issa Al-Balushi (UAE)	E	121	125	~~130~~	42	152	~~155~~	156	40	281
40	Jerome Tura (COK)	E	105	110	115	45	145	150	~~155~~	41	265
41	Bruno Braga (POR)	E	120	~~125~~	~~125~~	43	135	~~140~~	~~140~~	43	255
42	Maurice Aromo (KEN)	E	100	110	115	44	130	~~140~~	140	42	255
—	Antonino Pizzolato (ITA)	A	~~168~~	~~168~~	~~168~~	—	—	—	—	—	—
—	Safaa Rashed (IRQ)	A	~~155~~	~~155~~	—	—	—	—	—	—	—
—	Tian Tao (CHN)	A	168	~~173~~	~~176~~	7	~~209~~	~~212~~	~~214~~	—	—
—	Chuang Sheng-min (TPE)	C	~~150~~	~~150~~	~~150~~	—	180	—	—	31	—
—	Raphael Friedrich (GER)	B	161	~~164~~	~~164~~	10	~~190~~	~~191~~	~~191~~	—	—
—	Iván Escudero (ECU)	C	140	145	~~150~~	33	—	—	—	—	—
—	Faris Touairi (ALG)	B	—	—	—	—	—	—	—	—	—
—	Brayan Rodallegas (COL)	E	—	—	—	—	—	—	—	—	—
—	Cristiano Ficco (ITA)	E	—	—	—	—	—	—	—	—	—
—	Karlos Nasar (BUL)	E	—	—	—	—	—	—	—	—	—
—	Kyle Bruce (AUS)	E	—	—	—	—	—	—	—	—	—
—	Arley Méndez (CHI)	A	Did not start								
—	Revaz Davitadze (GEO)	B	Did not start								
—	Kristi Ramadani (ALB)	E	Did not start								
