= 2025 World Weightlifting Championships – Men's 94 kg =

Men's 94 kg at the 2025 World Weightlifting Championships
- Venue: Førdehuset
- Location: Førde, Norway
- Dates: 8 and 9 October
- Winning total: 395 kg ER

Medalists
gold medal	Karlos Nasar	Bulgaria
silver medal	Alireza Moeini	Iran
bronze medal	Jokser Albornoz	Colombia

The men's 94 kilograms competition at the 2025 World Weightlifting Championships was held on 8 and 9 October 2025.

== Schedule ==
Date	Time	Event
8 October 2025	14:00	Group C
9 October 2025	14:30	Group B
9 October 2025	19:30	Group A

== Records ==
Prior to this competition, the existing world records were as follows.

World record	Snatch	World Standard	181 kg	—	1 June 2025
World record	Clean & Jerk	World Standard	221 kg	—	1 June 2025
World record	Total	World Standard	396 kg	—	1 June 2025

== Results ==
Rank	Athlete	Group	Snatch (kg)				Clean & Jerk (kg)				Total
Rank	Athlete	Group	1	2	3	Rank	1	2	3	Rank	Total
1st place, gold medalist(s)	Karlos Nasar (BUL)	A	173	~~178~~	~~182~~	4	210	219	222 CWR	1st place, gold medalist(s)	395 ER
2nd place, silver medalist(s)	Alireza Moeini (IRI)	A	174	179	182 CWR	1st place, gold medalist(s)	198	204	209	5	391
3rd place, bronze medalist(s)	Jokser Albornoz (COL)	B	165	171	175	3rd place, bronze medalist(s)	207	212	215 AM	2nd place, silver medalist(s)	390 AM
4	Ali Aalipour (IRI)	A	~~171~~	172	176	2nd place, silver medalist(s)	211	~~217~~	~~219~~	4	387
5	Kianoush Rostami (KOS)	A	~~172~~	172	~~177~~	5	205	~~216~~	~~217~~	7	377
6	Marcos Bonilla (COL)	B	165	~~170~~	~~170~~	11	208	~~214~~	~~216~~	6	373
7	Romain Imadouchène (FRA)	B	~~157~~	~~158~~	160	15	203	211	~~214~~	3rd place, bronze medalist(s)	371
8	Maksym Dombrovskyi (UKR)	B	161	164	167	9	197	203	~~207~~	8	370
9	Ramiro Mora Romero (WRT)	B	162	167	~~170~~	8	~~201~~	201	~~207~~	10	368
10	Karim Abokahla (EGY)	A	164	~~168~~	~~168~~	12	~~203~~	~~203~~	203	9	367
11	Anton Serdiukov (UKR)	B	163	167	170	7	192	~~197~~	~~197~~	13	362
12	Juan Guadamud (ECU)	B	~~160~~	160	~~166~~	14	200	~~210~~	~~215~~	11	360
13	Patryk Sawulski (POL)	B	152	~~155~~	157	16	188	193	~~196~~	12	350
14	Antonio Govea (MEX)	C	147	152	156	17	180	186	~~190~~	16	342
15	Oliver Saxton (AUS)	C	~~150~~	150	155	18	180	~~185~~	185	17	340
16	Manuel Sánchez (ESP)	B	~~150~~	150	~~155~~	21	181	187	~~190~~	15	337
17	Dilbag Singh (IND)	C	146	150	154	19	180	~~185~~	~~185~~	20	334
18	Jonathan Ramos (MEX)	C	~~142~~	142	~~148~~	25	181	187	190	14	332
19	Joaquín Jones (ARG)	C	140	146	151	20	~~180~~	180	~~190~~	22	331
20	Yannick Tschan (SUI)	B	~~146~~	~~146~~	146	22	182	~~188~~	~~189~~	18	328
21	Lukas Kordušas (LTU)	C	~~145~~	145	~~150~~	23	175	180	~~185~~	21	325
22	Forrester Osei (GHA)	C	140	~~144~~	144	24	~~180~~	181	~~187~~	19	325
23	Jesse Nykänen (FIN)	C	140	~~144~~	~~144~~	26	165	~~169~~	170	23	310
—	Raphael Friedrich (GER)	A	163	168	171	6	~~203~~	~~203~~	~~203~~	—	—
—	Hakan Şükrü Kurnaz (TUR)	B	~~166~~	166	~~172~~	10	~~190~~	~~190~~	~~190~~	—	—
—	Hermann Ngaina (CMR)	C	125	~~130~~	~~135~~	27	~~160~~	~~160~~	~~162~~	—	—
—	Kofsha Ertjan (ALB)	C	~~161~~	161	~~163~~	13	~~190~~	~~193~~	~~193~~	—	—
—	Emre Öztürk (TUR)	A	Did not start								
—	Amel Atencia (PER)	B	Did not start								
X	Myren Madden (CWF)	C	~~143~~	~~143~~	143	X	~~170~~	170	176	X	319
X	Joshua Hutton (CWF)	C	144	~~148~~	148	X	164	169	~~176~~	X	317
X	Tom Wright (CWF)	C	~~137~~	~~137~~	138	X	160	~~168~~	~~168~~	X	298
X	Drew Burns (CWF)	C	~~138~~	~~138~~	~~138~~	X	162	~~170~~	~~176~~	X	—
