= Alireza Moeini =

Iranian weightlifter

Personal information
- Nationality: Iran
- Born: February 28, 2002 (age 24) Esfahan, Iran
- Weight: 96 kg (212 lb)

Sport
- Country: Iran
- Sport: Weightlifting
- Event: 94 kg

Achievements and titles
- Personal bests: Snatch: 182 kg (2025); Clean and jerk: 209 kg (2025); Total: 391 kg (2025)
Medal record
Representing Iran
Men's weightlifting
World Championships
| Silver medal – second place | 2025 Førde | 94 kg |
Asian Championships
| Bronze medal – third place | 2025 Jiangshan | 96 kg |

Alireza Moeini (Persian: علیرضا معینی, born 28 February 2002) is an Iranian weightlifter, who won a silver medal in men's 96 kg event at the 2024 World Weightlifting Championships held in 2024 Bahrain.

In the latest ranking released by the International Weightlifting Federation (IWF) in 2022, Moeini ranked second in the 89 kg junior category with a total lift of 357 kg. Additionally, he secured sixth place in the 96 kg junior category with a total of 348 kg.

== Major results ==
| Year | Venue | Weight | Snatch (kg) | | | | Clean & Jerk (kg) | | | | Total | Rank |
| Year | Venue | Weight | 1 | 2 | 3 | Rank | 1 | 2 | 3 | Rank | Total | Rank |
World Championships
| 2024 | Manama, Bahrain | 96 kg | 176 | ~~179~~ | ~~179~~ | 2nd place, silver medalist(s) | ~~193~~ | 193 | 202 | 10 | 378 | 7 |
| 2025 | Førde, Norway | 94 kg | 174 | 179 | 182 WR | 1st place, gold medalist(s) | 198 | 204 | 209 | 5 | 391 | 2nd place, silver medalist(s) |
| 2026 | Ningbo, China | 110 kg | 180 | ~~186~~ | ~~187~~ | 9 | 202 | 208 | ~~212~~ | 14 | 388 | 12 |
