= Kyle Bruce =

Australian weightlifter (born 1999)

Personal information
- Full name: Kyle John Ryan Christopher Park Bruce
- Nickname: Bruce Almighty
- Born: 12 July 1999 (age 26) Blacktown, New South Wales, Australia

Sport
- Country: Australia
- Sport: Weightlifting
- Weight class: 81 kg
- Club: Uplift Gym
- Team: National team
- Coached by: Alireza Azari
Medal record
Weightlifting
Representing Australia
Oceania Championships
Gold medal – first place	2023 Honiara	89 kg
Gold medal – first place	2024 Auckland	89 kg
Commonwealth Games
Silver medal – second place	2022 Birmingham	81 kg
Commonwealth Weightlifting Championships
Silver medal – second place	2021 Tashkent	81 kg
- Updated on 1 August 2022

Kyle John Ryan Christopher Park Bruce (born 12 July 1999) is an Australian weightlifter competing in the 81 kg weight class. He won silver at the 2022 Commonwealth Games in Birmingham, England.

== Career ==
Bruce competed in the men's 81 kg event at the 2021 World Weightlifting Championships held in Tashkent, Uzbekistan. He finished in 15th place in this competition. The 2021 Commonwealth Weightlifting Championships were also held at the same time and he won the silver medal in this event. This result enabled him to qualify to compete at the 2022 Commonwealth Games in Birmingham, England.

In 2022, Brunce lifted a total of 323kg to win silver in the 81 kg category at the 2022 Commonwealth Games held in Birmingham.

In August 2024, Bruce competed in the men's 89 kg event at the 2024 Summer Olympics held in Paris, France. He lifted 330 kg in total and placed 10th.

== Major results ==
Year	Venue	Weight	Snatch (kg)				Clean & Jerk (kg)				Total	Rank
Year	Venue	Weight	1	2	3	Rank	1	2	3	Rank	Total	Rank
Summer Olympics
2024	Paris, France	89 kg	143	~~148~~	148	—N/a	~~182~~	182	~~188~~	—N/a	330	10
World Championships
2021	Tashkent, Uzbekistan	81 kg	~~140~~	140	~~145~~	17	~~175~~	176	~~183~~	15	316	15
IWF World Cup
2024	Phuket, Thailand	89 kg	145	~~149~~	149	23	~~187~~	~~187~~	187	16	336	16
Oceania Championships
2023	Honiara, Solomon Islands	89 kg	141	146	~~151~~	1st place, gold medalist(s)	~~180~~	180	184	1st place, gold medalist(s)	330	1st place, gold medalist(s)
2024	Auckland, New Zealand	89 kg	144	147	~~151~~	1st place, gold medalist(s)	181	~~188~~	~~189~~	1st place, gold medalist(s)	328	1st place, gold medalist(s)
