= 2024 World Weightlifting Championships =

Weightlifting competition

2024 IWF World Championships
- Venue: Weightlifting Marquee Venue
- Location: Manama, Bahrain
- Dates: 6–15 December
- Competitors: 471 from 92 nations

The 2024 World Weightlifting Championships was a weightlifting competition held in Manama, Bahrain, from 6 to 15 December 2024.

== Schedule ==
All times are local (UTC+3).

Men's events
Date Event	Fri 6	Sat 7			Sun 8		Mon 9				Tue 10		Wed 11			Thu 12			Fri 13			Sat 14		Sun 15	
Date Event	20:00	13:00	15:00	20:00	12:30	17:30	08:00	10:00	12:30	20:00	12:30	17:30	09:00	15:00	20:00	11:00	13:00	17:30	10:00	14:30	20:00	13:00	17:30	13:00	17:30
55 kg	A																								
61 kg			B	A																					
67 kg		C			B	A																			
73 kg							C		B	A															
81 kg								C			B	A													
89 kg													C	B	A										
96 kg																C	B	A							
102 kg																				B	A				
109 kg																			C			B	A		
+109 kg																								B	A

Women's events
Date Event	Fri 6	Sat 7	Sun 8			Mon 9		Tue 10				Wed 11			Thu 12		Fri 13		Sat 14			Sun 15	
Date Event	17:30	17:30	10:00	15:00	20:00	14:30	17:30	08:00	10:00	15:00	20:00	10:30	13:00	17:30	15:00	20:00	12:30	17:30	11:00	15:30	20:00	11:00	15:00
45 kg	A																						
49 kg		A																					
55 kg			C	B	A																		
59 kg						B	A																
64 kg								D	C	B	A												
71 kg												C	B	A									
76 kg															B	A							
81 kg																	B	A					
87 kg																			C	B	A		
+87 kg																						B	A

== Medal table ==
Ranking by Big (Total result) medals

Rank	Nation	Gold	Silver	Bronze	Total
1	North Korea	9	5	2	16
2	China	4	2	3	9
3	Kazakhstan	2	1	0	3
4	Armenia	1	0	1	2
4	Uzbekistan	1	0	1	2
6	Bulgaria	1	0	0	1
6	Thailand	1	0	0	1
6	United States	1	0	0	1
9	Iran	0	1	3	4
10	Colombia	0	1	1	2
10	South Korea	0	1	1	2
12	Australia	0	1	0	1
12	Azerbaijan	0	1	0	1
12	Brazil	0	1	0	1
12	Chinese Taipei	0	1	0	1
12	Egypt	0	1	0	1
12	Georgia	0	1	0	1
12	Indonesia	0	1	0	1
12	Malaysia	0	1	0	1
12	Qatar	0	1	0	1
21	Philippines	0	0	2	2
21	Vietnam	0	0	2	2
23	Moldova	0	0	1	1
23	Nigeria	0	0	1	1
23	Spain	0	0	1	1
23	Turkey	0	0	1	1
Totals (26 entries)		20	20	20	60

Ranking by all medals: Big (Total result) and Small (Snatch and Clean & Jerk)

* Host nation (Bahrain)

Rank	Nation	Gold	Silver	Bronze	Total
1	North Korea	26	13	6	45
2	China	14	8	9	31
3	Kazakhstan	3	3	1	7
4	Uzbekistan	3	1	2	6
5	Bulgaria	3	0	0	3
6	Armenia	2	2	3	7
7	United States	2	1	0	3
8	South Korea	1	4	4	9
9	Iran	1	3	6	10
10	Colombia	1	3	3	7
11	Brazil	1	1	1	3
11	Thailand	1	1	1	3
13	Georgia	1	1	0	2
14	Spain	1	0	2	3
15	Australia	0	2	1	3
16	Azerbaijan	0	2	0	2
16	Egypt	0	2	0	2
16	Malaysia	0	2	0	2
16	Qatar	0	2	0	2
20	Chinese Taipei	0	1	3	4
20	Vietnam	0	1	3	4
22	Indonesia	0	1	1	2
22	Moldova	0	1	1	2
22	Turkmenistan	0	1	1	2
25	Bahrain*	0	1	0	1
25	Great Britain	0	1	0	1
25	Mongolia	0	1	0	1
25	Tunisia	0	1	0	1
29	Philippines	0	0	3	3
29	Turkey	0	0	3	3
31	Nigeria	0	0	2	2
32	Ecuador	0	0	1	1
32	Germany	0	0	1	1
32	Iraq	0	0	1	1
32	Italy	0	0	1	1
Totals (35 entries)		60	60	60	180

== Medal summary ==
=== Men ===
Event	Gold		Silver		Bronze	
55 kg
Snatch	Thiago Silva; Brazil	121 kg	Yang Yang; China	120 kg	Natthawat Chomchuen; Thailand	120 kg
Clean & Jerk	Pang Un-chol; North Korea	154 kg	Natthawat Chomchuen; Thailand	153 kg	Thiago Silva; Brazil	148 kg
Total	Natthawat Chomchuen; Thailand	273 kg	Thiago Silva; Brazil	269 kg	Fernando Agad; Philippines	263 kg
61 kg
Snatch	Pak Myong-jin; North Korea	132 kg	Nguyễn Trần Anh Tuấn; Vietnam	131 kg	Garnik Cholakyan; Armenia	130 kg
Clean & Jerk	Pak Myong-jin; North Korea	173 kg	Aniq Kasdan; Malaysia	166 kg	Wei Haixian; China	160 kg
Total	Pak Myong-jin; North Korea	305 kg	Aniq Kasdan; Malaysia	296 kg	Nguyễn Trần Anh Tuấn; Vietnam	291 kg
67 kg
Snatch	Pak Pyol; North Korea	150 kg	Zheng Xinhao; China	148 kg	Kaan Kahriman; Turkey	148 kg WJR
Clean & Jerk	Ri Won-ju; North Korea	190 kg WR	Pak Pyol; North Korea	182 kg	Yusuf Fehmi Genç; Turkey	181 kg
Total	Ri Won-ju; North Korea	336 kg	Pak Pyol; North Korea	332 kg	Yusuf Fehmi Genç; Turkey	327 kg
73 kg
Snatch	Edwin Lagarejo; Colombia	155 kg	Bunýad Raşidow; Turkmenistan	154 kg	Roberto Gutu; Germany	154 kg
Clean & Jerk	Ri Ryong-hyon; North Korea	197 kg	Lee Sang-yeon; South Korea	191 kg	Rizki Juniansyah; Indonesia	190 kg
Total	Ri Ryong-hyon; North Korea	349 kg	Rizki Juniansyah; Indonesia	340 kg	Zhong Zhiguang; China	336 kg
81 kg
Snatch	Ri Chong-song; North Korea	166 kg	Mukhammadkodir Toshtemirov; Uzbekistan	165 kg	Alexey Churkin; Kazakhstan	164 kg
Clean & Jerk	Ri Chong-song; North Korea	205 kg	Alexey Churkin; Kazakhstan	204 kg	Son Hyeon-ho; South Korea	197 kg
Total	Ri Chong-song; North Korea	371 kg	Alexey Churkin; Kazakhstan	368 kg	Mukhammadkodir Toshtemirov; Uzbekistan	355 kg
89 kg
Snatch	Karlos Nasar; Bulgaria	183 kg WR	Marin Robu; Moldova	173 kg	Sarvarbek Zafarjonov; Uzbekistan	171 kg
Clean & Jerk	Karlos Nasar; Bulgaria	222 kg	Ro Kwang-ryol; North Korea	218 kg	Pan Yunhua; China	208 kg
Total	Karlos Nasar; Bulgaria	405 kg WR	Ro Kwang-ryol; North Korea	380 kg	Marin Robu; Moldova	379 kg
96 kg
Snatch	Revaz Davitadze; Georgia	177 kg	Alireza Moeini; Iran	176 kg	Qian Feixiang; China	175 kg
Clean & Jerk	Won Jong-beom; South Korea	214 kg	Nurgissa Adiletuly; Kazakhstan	214 kg	Ali Alipour; Iran	214 kg
Total	Nurgissa Adiletuly; Kazakhstan	388 kg	Revaz Davitadze; Georgia	387 kg	Ali Alipour; Iran	387 kg
102 kg
Snatch	Marcos Ruiz; Spain	183 kg	Aymen Bacha; Tunisia	183 kg	Döwranbek Hasanbaýew; Turkmenistan	182 kg
Clean & Jerk	Artyom Antropov; Kazakhstan	230 kg	Fares El-Bakh; Qatar	225 kg	Jhonatan Rivas; Colombia	213 kg
Total	Artyom Antropov; Kazakhstan	400 kg	Fares El-Bakh; Qatar	399 kg	Marcos Ruiz; Spain	395 kg
109 kg
Snatch	Sharofiddin Amriddinov; Uzbekistan	184 kg	Garik Karapetyan; Armenia	183 kg	Mehdi Karami; Iran	183 kg
Clean & Jerk	Ruslan Nurudinov; Uzbekistan	242 kg WR	Dadash Dadashbayli; Azerbaijan	221 kg	Salwan Al-Aifuri; Iraq	220 kg
Total	Ruslan Nurudinov; Uzbekistan	424 kg	Dadash Dadashbayli; Azerbaijan	404 kg	Mehdi Karami; Iran	400 kg
+109 kg
Snatch	Varazdat Lalayan; Armenia	215 kg	Gor Minasyan; Bahrain	210 kg	Ali Davoudi; Iran	206 kg
Clean & Jerk	Alireza Yousefi; Iran	262 kg AR	Ali Davoudi; Iran	253 kg	Varazdat Lalayan; Armenia	252 kg
Total	Varazdat Lalayan; Armenia	467 kg	Ali Davoudi; Iran	459 kg	Alireza Yousefi; Iran	456 kg

=== Women ===
Event	Gold		Silver		Bronze	
45 kg
Snatch	Zhao Jinhong; China	87 kg	Won Hyon-sim; North Korea	86 kg	Marta García; Spain	75 kg
Clean & Jerk	Zhao Jinhong; China	113 kg WR	Won Hyon-sim; North Korea	105 kg	Phạm Đình Thi; Vietnam	97 kg
Total	Zhao Jinhong; China	200 kg WR	Won Hyon-sim; North Korea	191 kg	Phạm Đình Thi; Vietnam	170 kg
49 kg
Snatch	Xiang Linxiang; China	92 kg	Ri Song-gum; North Korea	91 kg	Rosegie Ramos; Philippines	88 kg
Clean & Jerk	Ri Song-gum; North Korea	122 kg	Xiang Linxiang; China	120 kg WJR	Lin Cheng-jing; Chinese Taipei	107 kg
Total	Ri Song-gum; North Korea	213 kg	Xiang Linxiang; China	212 kg WJR	Rosegie Ramos; Philippines	193 kg
55 kg
Snatch	Kang Hyon-gyong; North Korea	100 kg	Zhang Haiqin; China	97 kg	Chen Guan-ling; Chinese Taipei	93 kg
Clean & Jerk	Kang Hyon-gyong; North Korea	126 kg	Aleksandra Grigoryan; Armenia	120 kg WJR	Chen Guan-ling; Chinese Taipei	118 kg
Total	Kang Hyon-gyong; North Korea	226 kg	Chen Guan-ling; Chinese Taipei	211 kg	Aleksandra Grigoryan; Armenia	205 kg
59 kg
Snatch	Kim Il-gyong; North Korea	108 kg	Pei Xinyi; China	107 kg	Lucrezia Magistris; Italy	99 kg
Clean & Jerk	Kim Il-gyong; North Korea	141 kg WR	Pei Xinyi; China	130 kg	Yenny Álvarez; Colombia	126 kg
Total	Kim Il-gyong; North Korea	249 kg WR	Pei Xinyi; China	237 kg	Yenny Álvarez; Colombia	224 kg
64 kg
Snatch	Rim Un-sim; North Korea	116 kg	Ri Suk; North Korea	115 kg	Li Shuang; China	107 kg
Clean & Jerk	Ri Suk; North Korea	149 kg WR	Rim Un-sim; North Korea	140 kg	Li Shuang; China	134 kg
Total	Ri Suk; North Korea	264 kg WR	Rim Un-sim; North Korea	256 kg	Li Shuang; China	241 kg
71 kg
Snatch	Yang Qiuxia; China	121 kg	Olivia Reeves; United States	120 kg	Jong Chun-hui; North Korea	116 kg
Clean & Jerk	Olivia Reeves; United States	147 kg	Jong Chun-hui; North Korea	146 kg	Yang Qiuxia; China	140 kg
Total	Olivia Reeves; United States	267 kg	Jong Chun-hui; North Korea	262 kg	Yang Qiuxia; China	261 kg
76 kg
Snatch	Song Kuk-hyang; North Korea	116 kg	Miyareth Mendoza; Colombia	111 kg	Sarah Matthew; Nigeria	110 kg
Clean & Jerk	Song Kuk-hyang; North Korea	148 kg	Miyareth Mendoza; Colombia	137 kg	Bella Paredes; Ecuador	136 kg
Total	Song Kuk-hyang; North Korea	264 kg	Miyareth Mendoza; Colombia	248 kg	Sarah Matthew; Nigeria	245 kg
81 kg
Snatch	Liao Guifang; China	123 kg	Mönkhjantsangiin Ankhtsetseg; Mongolia	116 kg	Kim Kyong-ryong; North Korea	114 kg
Clean & Jerk	Liao Guifang; China	155 kg	Sara Ahmed; Egypt	149 kg	Kim Kyong-ryong; North Korea	147 kg
Total	Liao Guifang; China	278 kg	Sara Ahmed; Egypt	262 kg	Kim Kyong-ryong; North Korea	261 kg
87 kg
Snatch	Wu Yan; China	122 kg	Madias Nzesso; Great Britain	114 kg	Eileen Cikamatana; Australia	113 kg
Clean & Jerk	Wu Yan; China	150 kg	Eileen Cikamatana; Australia	144 kg	Kim Yong-ju; North Korea	144 kg
Total	Wu Yan; China	272 kg	Eileen Cikamatana; Australia	257 kg	Kim Yong-ju; North Korea	256 kg
+87 kg
Snatch	Li Yan; China	149 kg WR	Park Hye-jeong; South Korea	124 kg	Son Young-hee; South Korea	118 kg
Clean & Jerk	Li Yan; China	175 kg	Park Hye-jeong; South Korea	171 kg	Son Young-hee; South Korea	162 kg
Total	Li Yan; China	324 kg	Park Hye-jeong; South Korea	295 kg	Son Young-hee; South Korea	280 kg

== Team ranking ==
=== Men ===
Rank	Team	Points
1	China	566
2	Iran	560
3	North Korea	495
4	Colombia	470
5	Kazakhstan	448
6	South Korea	393

=== Women ===
Rank	Team	Points
1	North Korea	776
2	China	713
3	Colombia	566
4	Chinese Taipei	440
5	Mexico	440
6	United States	433

== Participating countries ==
A total of 471 competitors from 92 nations participated in the championships.

- Albania (3)
- Saudi Arabia (6)
- Argentina (2)
- Armenia (11)
- Individual Neutral Athletes (7)
- Australia (2)
- Austria (3)
- Azerbaijan (2)
- Bahrain (3)
- Bangladesh (3)
- Bosnia and Herzegovina (1)
- Brazil (2)
- Brunei (3)
- Bulgaria (10)
- Cameroon (2)
- Canada (12)
- Chile (4)
- China (20)
- Colombia (20)
- North Korea (17)
- South Korea (20)
- Costa Rica (1)
- Croatia (4)
- Cuba (2)
- Denmark (6)
- Ecuador (3)
- Egypt (6)
- United Arab Emirates (3)
- Fiji (1)
- Philippines (6)
- Finland (1)
- France (5)
- Georgia (8)
- Germany (3)
- Ghana (3)
- Japan (3)
- Greece (1)
- India (3)
- Indonesia (9)
- Iran (14)
- Iraq (2)
- Ireland (4)
- Iceland (5)
- Northern Mariana Islands (1)
- Israel (3)
- Italy (3)
- Kazakhstan (15)
- Kuwait (4)
- Latvia (3)
- Lithuania (8)
- Luxembourg (1)
- Madagascar (2)
- Malaysia (5)
- Malta (3)
- Mexico (20)
- Moldova (2)
- Mongolia (3)
- Nigeria (2)
- Norway (3)
- New Zealand (3)
- Netherlands (1)
- Palestine (1)
- Papua New Guinea (1)
- Peru (4)
- Poland (2)
- Portugal (3)
- Puerto Rico (3)
- Qatar (1)
- United Kingdom (7)
- Czech Republic (6)
- Dominican Republic (1)
- Romania (2)
- Sierra Leone (1)
- Slovakia (6)
- Spain (8)
- United States (19)
- South Africa (2)
- Sudan (1)
- Switzerland (2)
- Chinese Taipei (15)
- Thailand (5)
- Tunisia (5)
- Turkey (4)
- Turkmenistan (8)
- Ukraine (11)
- Uganda (1)
- Hungary (2)
- Uzbekistan (6)
- Venezuela (3)
- Vietnam (7)
- Weightlifting Refugee Team (4)
- Yemen (2)

== See also ==
- List of World Championships medalists in weightlifting (men)
- List of World Championships medalists in weightlifting (women)
