= Mirmostafa Javadi =

Iranian weightlifter (born 2000)

Personal information
- Full name: Mirmostafa Javadi Aliabadi
- Nationality: Iranian
- Born: 22 June 2000 (age 26) Karaj, Alborz, Iran
- Weight: 89 kg (196 lb)

Sport
- Country: Iran
- Sport: Weightlifting
- Event: 89 kg

Achievements and titles
- Personal bests: Snatch: 169 kg (2023); Clean and jerk: 215 kg (2023); Total: 384 kg (2023)
Medal record
Representing Iran
Men's weightlifting
World Championships
Gold medal – first place	2023 Riyadh	89 kg
Silver medal – second place	2021 Tashkent	81 kg
Asian Championships
Bronze medal – third place	2023 Jinju	89 kg
Islamic Solidarity Games
Gold medal – first place	2021 Konya	81 kg C&J
Gold medal – first place	2021 Konya	81 kg T (Note: At the 2021 Islamic Solidarity Games, medals from the snatch, clean & jerk and total are calculated separately and are all included in the medal table.)
Silver medal – second place	2021 Konya	81 kg S

Mirmostafa Javadi Aliabadi (Persian: میر مصطفی جوادی علی‌آبادی; born 22 June 2000) is an Iranian weightlifter who was the 2023 World Weightlifting Champion at 89 kg 2023 World Championships, he previously won a silver medal at the 2021 World Championships.

== Career ==
In August 2024, Javadi competed in the men's 89 kg event at the 2024 Summer Olympics held in Paris, France. He lifted 372 kg in total and placed fifth.

== Major results ==
Year	Venue	Weight	Snatch (kg)				Clean & Jerk (kg)				Total	Rank
Year	Venue	Weight	1	2	3	Rank	1	2	3	Rank	Total	Rank
Olympic Games
2024	Paris, France	89 kg	164	168	~~171~~	—N/a	204	~~217~~	~~217~~	—N/a	372	5
World Championships
2021	Tashkent, Uzbekistan	81 kg	155	159	163	3rd place, bronze medalist(s)	193	198	204	2nd place, silver medalist(s)	367	2nd place, silver medalist(s)
2022	Bogotá, Colombia	81 kg	155	~~161~~	~~162~~	8	~~196~~	~~197~~	~~198~~	—	—	—
2023	Riyadh, Saudi Arabia	89 kg	~~161~~	162	169	6	207	212	215	1st place, gold medalist(s)	384	1st place, gold medalist(s)
IWF World Cup
2024	Phuket, Thailand	89 kg	160	—	—	16	~~206~~	—	—	—	—	—
Asian Games
2023	Hangzhou, China	96 kg	~~161~~	161	~~168~~	—N/a	202	~~212~~	~~214~~	—N/a	363	9
Asian Championships
2019	Ningbo, China	81 kg	143	150	154	6	182	~~194~~	~~195~~	6	336	6
2021	Tashkent, Uzbekistan	73 kg	146	~~151~~	151	3rd place, bronze medalist(s)	183	~~187~~	~~187~~	5	334	5
2023	Jinju, South Korea	89 kg	154	159	~~163~~	8	197	205	~~211~~	3rd place, bronze medalist(s)	364	3rd place, bronze medalist(s)
Islamic Solidarity Games
2022	Konya, Turkey	81 kg	156	163	~~165~~	2nd place, silver medalist(s)	194	201	—	1st place, gold medalist(s)	364	1st place, gold medalist(s)
