= 2024 World Weightlifting Championships – Men's 89 kg =

Men's 89 kg at the 2024 World Weightlifting Championships
- Venue: Weightlifting Marquee Venue
- Location: Manama, Bahrain
- Dates: 11 December
- Competitors: 24 from 23 nations
- Winning total: 405 kg

Medalists
| gold medal | Karlos Nasar | Bulgaria |
| silver medal | Ro Kwang-ryol | North Korea |
| bronze medal | Marin Robu | Moldova |

The men's 89 kilograms competition at the 2024 World Weightlifting Championships was held on 11 December 2024.

== Schedule ==
| Date | Time | Event |
|---|---|---|
| 11 December 2024 | 09:00 | Group C |
| 11 December 2024 | 15:00 | Group B |
| 11 December 2024 | 20:00 | Group A |

== Records ==
Prior to this competition, the existing world records were as follows.

| World Record | Snatch | Yeison López (COL) | 182 kg | Phuket, Thailand | 6 April 2024 |
| World Record | Clean & Jerk | Karlos Nasar (BUL) | 224 kg | Paris, France | 9 August 2024 |
| World Record | Total | Karlos Nasar (BUL) | 404 kg | Paris, France | 9 August 2024 |

== Results ==
| Rank | Athlete | Group | Snatch (kg) | | | | Clean & Jerk (kg) | | | | Total |
| Rank | Athlete | Group | 1 | 2 | 3 | Rank | 1 | 2 | 3 | Rank | Total |
|---|---|---|---|---|---|---|---|---|---|---|---|
| 1st place, gold medalist(s) | Karlos Nasar (BUL) | A | 170 | 176 | 183 CWR | 1st place, gold medalist(s) | 210 | 222 | ~~225~~ | 1st place, gold medalist(s) | 405 CWR |
| 2nd place, silver medalist(s) | Ro Kwang-ryol (PRK) | A | ~~162~~ | 162 | ~~167~~ | 9 | 210 | 216 | 218 | 2nd place, silver medalist(s) | 380 |
| 3rd place, bronze medalist(s) | Marin Robu (MDA) | A | 169 | 173 | ~~175~~ | 2nd place, silver medalist(s) | 201 | 206 | ~~209~~ | 4 | 379 |
| 4 | Sarvarbek Zafarjonov (UZB) | A | 166 | 171 | ~~174~~ | 3rd place, bronze medalist(s) | 190 | 201 | 204 | 6 | 375 |
| 5 | Denis Poluboyarinov (KAZ) | B | 160 | 165 | ~~170~~ | 5 | 195 | 205 | ~~210~~ | 5 | 370 |
| 6 | Pan Yunhua (CHN) | A | ~~160~~ | 160 | ~~165~~ | 12 | 200 | 205 | 208 | 3rd place, bronze medalist(s) | 368 |
| 7 | Raphael Friedrich (GER) | A | ~~162~~ | ~~163~~ | 163 | 7 | 190 | 196 | 201 | 8 | 364 |
| 8 | Yu Dong-ju (KOR) | A | 155 | 160 | ~~165~~ | 11 | 195 | 201 | ~~207~~ | 7 | 361 |
| 9 | Yulian Kurlovich (AIN) | A | 158 | ~~161~~ | 161 | 10 | ~~195~~ | 195 | ~~200~~ | 9 | 356 |
| 10 | Denis Ulanov (KAZ) | B | 155 | ~~158~~ | 158 | 13 | 190 | 193 | ~~198~~ | 10 | 351 |
| 11 | Braydon Kennedy (CAN) | B | ~~158~~ | 158 | 163 | 6 | 186 | ~~190~~ | ~~191~~ | 13 | 349 |
| 12 | Brandon Victorian (USA) | B | 151 | ~~156~~ | 156 | 15 | ~~189~~ | ~~189~~ | 189 | 12 | 345 |
| 13 | Mauricio Canul (MEX) | B | 145 | 150 | ~~153~~ | 18 | 185 | 191 | ~~196~~ | 11 | 341 |
| 14 | Saba Asanidze (GEO) | B | 147 | 151 | ~~154~~ | 16 | 183 | ~~188~~ | ~~188~~ | 14 | 334 |
| 15 | William Swart (RSA) | C | 133 | 139 | ~~143~~ | 19 | 167 | 173 | 179 | 16 | 318 |
| 16 | Alejo Gómez (ARG) | C | 135 | ~~140~~ | ~~140~~ | 21 | ~~170~~ | 171 | 178 | 17 | 313 |
| 17 | Seán Brown (IRL) | C | 133 | 138 | ~~142~~ | 20 | 162 | 167 | ~~171~~ | 18 | 305 |
| — | Andranik Karapetyan (ARM) | A | 170 | ~~175~~ | ~~175~~ | 4 | ~~201~~ | ~~203~~ | ~~203~~ | — | — |
| — | Mir Mostafa Javadi (IRI) | A | 162 | ~~168~~ | ~~171~~ | 8 | ~~203~~ | ~~206~~ | ~~209~~ | — | — |
| — | Armands Mežinskis (LAT) | B | 153 | 157 | ~~160~~ | 14 | ~~192~~ | ~~192~~ | ~~192~~ | — | — |
| — | Amel Atencia (PER) | B | 150 | ~~154~~ | ~~154~~ | 17 | — | — | — | — | — |
| — | Diego Betancur (COL) | B | ~~155~~ | ~~155~~ | ~~155~~ | — | 180 | ~~190~~ | — | 15 | — |
| — | John Tabique (PHI) | C | ~~135~~ | ~~135~~ | ~~135~~ | — | 165 | ~~170~~ | ~~172~~ | 19 | — |
| — | Žilvinas Žilinskas (LTU) | C | — | — | — | — | — | — | — | — | — |
| — | Mohammed Ebrahim (YEM) | C | Did not start | | | | | | | | |
