= Karlos Nasar =

Bulgarian weightlifter (born 2004)

Karlos Nasar OLY
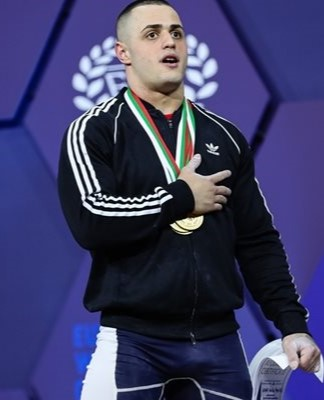

Personal information
- Nationality: Bulgarian
- Born: 12 May 2004 (age 22) Paris, France
- Height: 183 cm (6 ft 0 in)
- Weight: 93.25 kg (205.6 lb)

Sport
- Country: Bulgaria
- Sport: Weightlifting
- Weight class: 94 kg
- Club: SKVT Start Cherven Bryag
- Coached by: Iliyan Iliev

Achievements and titles
- Personal bests: Snatch: 188 kg (2025, CWR); Clean & Jerk: 230 kg 2026 World Weightlifting Championships(this version); Total: 418 kg (2025, CWR)
Medal record
Representing Bulgaria
Men's weightlifting
Olympic Games
Gold medal – first place	2024 Paris	89 kg
World Championships
Gold medal – first place	2021 Tashkent	81 kg
Gold medal – first place	2024 Manama	89 kg
Gold medal – first place	2025 Førde	94 kg
Gold medal – first place	2026 Ningbo	95 kg
European Championships
Gold medal – first place	2023 Yerevan	89 kg
Gold medal – first place	2024 Sofia	89 kg
Gold medal – first place	2025 Chisinau	96 kg
Gold medal – first place	2026 Batumi	94 kg
Silver medal – second place	2021 Moscow	81 kg
Silver medal – second place	2022 Tirana	89 kg
IWF World Cup
Gold medal – first place	2024 Phuket	89 kg
IWF Grand Prix
Gold medal – first place	2023 Doha	89 kg
World Youth Championships
Gold medal – first place	2019 Las Vegas	73 kg
IWF Youth World Cup Online
Gold medal – first place	2020 Peru	81 kg
European Youth Weightlifting Championships
Gold medal – first place	2018 San Donato Milanese	69 kg
Gold medal – first place	2019 Eilat	81 kg

Karlos May Nasar (Bulgarian: Карлос Мей Насар; born 12 May 2004) is a Bulgarian weightlifter who is an Olympic champion, four-time World champion, and four-time European champion and one of the youngest weightlifting world record holders ever. He was named Bulgaria's Sportsman of the Year for 2024 and 2025. Nasar also received the 2024 and 2025 Ikarus Sports Award.

== Early life ==
Nasar was born in Paris to a Bulgarian mother and a Lebanese father. He has two brothers, Lazar and Ivan. He grew up in his native town of Cherven Bryag, where he started his professional career at СКВТ „Старт“.

== Career ==
=== Olympic games ===
In Nasar's Olympic debut, he won the 2024 Olympic men's 89 kg event, breaking eight World and Olympic records in the process. In the 89 kg final, he first lifted 213 kg in the clean & jerk for a new OR, and then proceeded to a World (and Olympic, and Junior) best mark of 224 kg. Adding these results to the 180 kg successful attempt in the snatch, he established an OR in the total (393 kg) and then a World, Olympic, and World Junior global mark of 404 kg. Out of the 13 records in the male competition in Paris, he was responsible for eight of them.

=== World Championships ===
At 17 years old, he broke the world record in the men's 81 kg Clean & Jerk event with 208 kg to win the 2021 World Weightlifting Championships, simultaneously setting the junior and youth world records with a world record 374 kg total. He became the third youngest world champion in the history of weightlifting at the age of 17 years and 214 days, beaten by another Bulgarian Sevdalin Marinov, who became the world champion in the 52 kg in 1985 when he was 17 years and 47 days old, and Ilya Ilyin, who became world champion in the 85 kg class at 17 years and 183 days old.

At 18 years old, he broke the world record in the men's 89 kg Clean & Jerk event with 220 kg to win the Clean & Jerk event at the 2022 World Weightlifting Championships held in Bogotá, Colombia. He became the only male weightlifter to hold world records in two different categories.

In December 2024, he won his second World Championship in Manama, Bahrain setting a new snatch senior record of 183 kg and also a new total senior record of 405 kg, surpassing for the second time the 400 mark in category 89 kg. Amazingly, those were junior world records too because, Nasar is still only 20 years old.

In October 2025, he won his third World Championship in Førde, Norway. In the clean and jerk, the Bulgarian ranked first with successful attempts of 210, 219, and a world record of 222 kg, to collect a total of 395 kg.

=== European Championships ===
In 2021, at the age of 16, he competed at the European Weightlifting Championships in the 81 kg category, winning the silver in the snatch and in the total and the gold medal in the clean & jerk portion with a new European record of 206 kg ER. It was a fight between Antonino Pizzolato and him in which the Italian won with 1 kg difference in total.

In April 2023, at just 18 years old, at the 2023 European Weightlifting Championships in Yerevan, Armenia, he won the gold medal in the Clean & Jerk and in the Total, and the silver medal in the Snatch in the 89-kilogram division, where he broke five world records. Nasar's staggering 221-kilogram (487.2-pound) clean & jerk record lift allowed him to break the:

- Junior World Record Clean & Jerk
- Junior World Record Total
- Senior World Record Clean & Jerk
- Senior World Record Total

In addition, Nasar's gold-medal-winning, record-setting Total of 395 kilograms was built with his best competition snatch of 174 kilograms (383.6 pounds). That snatch was also a new Junior World Record, his fifth on the same day. Nasar's result in Yerevan made him Best weightlifter of the European Championship in all categories. Nasar scored 1,000 points on the Robi points system. Lasha Talahadze is in second place with 883.5 points, and Garik Karapetyan is third with 847.6 points.

=== World records ===
==== Senior world records ====
As of 19 April 2025, Karlos Nasar has set 13 senior world weightlifting records for 4 different weights (81 kg, 89 kg, 94, 96 kg), records before the 01.01.2025 are also valid as junior world record for the respective category, records before 2022 are also valid as youth world record for the respective category.

Full list of Nasar's senior world records follows:

No.	Category up to	Discipline	Senior world record (kg)	Date	Competition	Place
1	81 kg	clean & jerk	208	12.12.2021	2021 World Weightlifting Championships	Tashkent, Uzbekistan
2	89 kg	clean & jerk	220	11.12.2022	2022 World Weightlifting Championships	Bogota, Colombia
3	89 kg	clean & jerk	221	20.04.2023	2023 European Weightlifting Championships	Yerevan, Armenia
4	89 kg	total	395	20.04.2023	2023 European Weightlifting Championships	Yerevan, Armenia
5	89 kg	clean & jerk	223	10.12.2023	IWF Grand Prix	Doha, Qatar
6	89 kg	snatch	181	06.04.2024	2024 IWF World Cup	Phuket, Thailand
7	89 kg	clean & jerk	224	09.08.2024	2024 Summer Olympics	Paris, France
8	89 kg	total	404	09.08.2024	2024 Summer Olympics	Paris, France
9	89 kg	snatch	183	11.12.2024	2024 World Weightlifting Championships	Manama, Bahrain
10	89 kg	total	405	11.12.2024	2024 World Weightlifting Championships	Manama, Bahrain
11	96 kg	snatch	188	19.04.2025	2025 European Weightlifting Championships	Chișinău, Moldova
12	96 kg	total	417	19.04.2025	2025 European Weightlifting Championships	Chișinău, Moldova
13	94 kg	clean & jerk	222	09.10.2025	2025 World Weightlifting Championships	Førde, Norway

As of 10 October 2025, Karlos Nasar holds the following 6 senior world records:

Category up to	Discipline	Senior world record (kg)	Date	Competition	Place
89 kg	snatch	183	11.12.2024	2024 World Weightlifting Championships	Manama, Bahrain
89 kg	clean & jerk	224	09.08.2024	2024 Summer Olympics	Paris, France
89 kg	total	405	11.12.2024	2024 World Weightlifting Championships	Manama, Bahrain
96 kg	snatch	188	19.04.2025	2025 European Weightlifting Championships	Chișinău, Moldova
96 kg	total	417	19.04.2025	2025 European Weightlifting Championships	Chișinău, Moldova
94 kg	clean & jerk	222	09.10.2025	2025 World Weightlifting Championships	Førde, Norway

==== Junior world records ====
As of 31 December 2024, Nasar has set twenty junior world records in categories up to 81 kg and up to 89 kg, records before 2022 are also valid as youth world record for the respective category.

No.	Category up to	Discipline	Junior world record (kg)	Date	Competition	Place
1	81 kg	clean & jerk	206	07.04.2021	2021 European Weightlifting Championships	Moscow, Russia
2	81 kg	clean & jerk	208	12.12.2021	2021 World Weightlifting Championships	Tashkent, Uzbekistan
3	81 kg	total	374	12.12.2021	2021 World Weightlifting Championships	Tashkent, Uzbekistan
4	89 kg	snatch	171	02.06.2021	2022 European Weightlifting Championships	Tirana, Albania
5	89 kg	clean & jerk	211	02.06.2021	2022 European Weightlifting Championships	Tirana, Albania
6	89 kg	total	374	02.06.2021	2022 European Weightlifting Championships	Tirana, Albania
7	89 kg	total	382	02.06.2021	2022 European Weightlifting Championships	Tirana, Albania
8	89 kg	clean & jerk	212	11.12.2022	2022 World Weightlifting Championships	Bogota, Colombia
9	89 kg	clean & jerk	220	11.12.2022	2022 World Weightlifting Championships	Bogota, Colombia
10	89 kg	snatch	174	20.04.2023	2023 European Weightlifting Championships	Yerevan, Armenia
11	89 kg	clean & jerk	221	20.04.2023	2023 European Weightlifting Championships	Yerevan, Armenia
12	89 kg	total	395	20.04.2023	2023 European Weightlifting Championships	Yerevan, Armenia
13	89 kg	clean & jerk	223	10.12.2023	IWF Grand Prix	Doha, Qatar
14	89 kg	snatch	176	17.02.2024	2024 European Weightlifting Championships	Sofia, Bulgaria
15	89 kg	clean & jerk	181	06.04.2024	2024 IWF World Cup	Phuket, Thailand
16	89 kg	total	396	06.04.2024	2024 IWF World Cup	Phuket, Thailand
17	89 kg	clean & jerk	224	09.08.2024	2024 Summer Olympics	Paris, France
18	89 kg	total	404	09.08.2024	2024 Summer Olympics	Paris, France
19	89 kg	snatch	183	11.12.2024	2024 World Weightlifting Championships	Manama, Bahrain
20	89 kg	total	405	11.12.2024	2024 World Weightlifting Championships	Manama, Bahrain

As of 31 December 2024, Karlos Nasar holds the following junior world records:

Category up to	Discipline	Junior world record (kg)	Date	Competition	Place
81 kg	clean & jerk	208	12.12.2021	2021 World Weightlifting Championships	Tashkent, Uzbekistan
81 kg	total	374	12.12.2021	2021 World Weightlifting Championships	Tashkent, Uzbekistan
89 kg	snatch	183	11.12.2024	2024 World Weightlifting Championships	Manama, Bahrain
89 kg	clean & jerk	224	09.08.2024	2024 Summer Olympics	Paris, France
89 kg	total	405	11.12.2024	2024 World Weightlifting Championships	Manama, Bahrain

==== Youth world records ====
Karlos Nasar has achieved twelve youth world records all set at 81 kg category at the European and World Championships in 2021.

No.	Category up to	Discipline	Junior world record (kg)	Date	Competition	Place
1	81 kg	snatch	158	07.04.2021	2021 European Weightlifting Championships	Moscow, Russia
2	81 kg	snatch	163	07.04.2021	2021 European Weightlifting Championships	Moscow, Russia
3	81 kg	clean & jerk	194	07.04.2021	2021 European Weightlifting Championships	Moscow, Russia
4	81 kg	clean & jerk	200	07.04.2021	2021 European Weightlifting Championships	Moscow, Russia
5	81 kg	clean & jerk	206	07.04.2021	2021 European Weightlifting Championships	Moscow, Russia
6	81 kg	total	357	07.04.2021	2021 European Weightlifting Championships	Moscow, Russia
7	81 kg	total	363	07.04.2021	2021 European Weightlifting Championships	Moscow, Russia
8	81 kg	total	369	07.04.2021	2021 European Weightlifting Championships	Moscow, Russia
9	81 kg	snatch	166	12.12.2021	2021 World Weightlifting Championships	Tashkent, Uzbekistan
10	81 kg	clean & jerk	208	12.12.2021	2021 World Weightlifting Championships	Tashkent, Uzbekistan
11	81 kg	total	371	12.12.2021	2021 World Weightlifting Championships	Tashkent, Uzbekistan
12	81 kg	total	374	12.12.2021	2021 World Weightlifting Championships	Tashkent, Uzbekistan

As of 31 December 2024, Karlos Nasar holds the following youth world records:

Category up to	Discipline	Youth world record (kg)	Date	Competition	Place
81 kg	snatch	166	12.12.2021	2021 World Weightlifting Championships	Tashkent, Uzbekistan
81 kg	clean & jerk	208	12.12.2021	2021 World Weightlifting Championships	Tashkent, Uzbekistan
81 kg	total	374	12.12.2021	2021 World Weightlifting Championships	Tashkent, Uzbekistan

== Major results ==
Year	Venue	Weight	Snatch (kg)				Clean & Jerk (kg)				Total	Rank
Year	Venue	Weight	1	2	3	Rank	1	2	3	Rank	Total	Rank
Representing Bulgaria
Olympic Games
2024	Paris, France	89 kg	173	177	180 OR	—N/a	213	224 CWR, OR	—	—N/a	404 WR, OR	1st place, gold medalist(s)
World Championships
2021	Tashkent, Uzbekistan	81 kg	163	166 EJR	~~169~~	2nd place, silver medalist(s)	200	205	208 WR	1st place, gold medalist(s)	374 JWR	1st place, gold medalist(s)
2022	Bogotá, Colombia	89 kg	~~173~~	~~173~~	~~174~~	—	212	~~217~~	220 WR	1st place, gold medalist(s)	—	—
2024	Manama, Bahrain	89 kg	170	176	183 CWR	1st place, gold medalist(s)	210	222	~~225~~	1st place, gold medalist(s)	405 CWR	1st place, gold medalist(s)
2025	Førde, Norway	94 kg	173	~~178~~	~~182~~	4	210	219	222WR	1st place, gold medalist(s)	395	1st place, gold medalist(s)
2026	Ningbo, China	95 kg	175	180	185 CWR	1st place, gold medalist(s)	213	220	230 CWR	1st place, gold medalist(s)	415 CWR	1st place, gold medalist(s)
European Championships
2021	Moscow, Russia	81 kg	158	~~162~~	163 EJR	2nd place, silver medalist(s)	194	200	206 ER	1st place, gold medalist(s)	369 EJR	2nd place, silver medalist(s)
2022	Tirana, Albania	89 kg	171 WJR	~~175~~	~~176~~	3rd place, bronze medalist(s)	203	211 WJR	~~217~~	2nd place, silver medalist(s)	382 WJR	2nd place, silver medalist(s)
2023	Yerevan, Armenia	89 kg	165	170	174 WJR	2nd place, silver medalist(s)	205	221 WR	—	1st place, gold medalist(s)	395 WR	1st place, gold medalist(s)
2024	Sofia, Bulgaria	89 kg	168	173	176 WJR	1st place, gold medalist(s)	208	215	—	1st place, gold medalist(s)	391	1st place, gold medalist(s)
2025	Chișinău, Moldova	96 kg	174	180	188 CWR	1st place, gold medalist(s)	210	220	229 ER	1st place, gold medalist(s)	417 CWR	1st place, gold medalist(s)
2026	Batumi, Georgia	94 kg	170	176	~~183~~	1st place, gold medalist(s)	~~210~~	210	~~223~~	1st place, gold medalist(s)	386	1st place, gold medalist(s)
IWF World Cup
2024	Phuket, Thailand	89 kg	170	176	181 WR	2nd place, silver medalist(s)	215	~~224~~	~~224~~	1st place, gold medalist(s)	396 JWR	1st place, gold medalist(s)
IWF Grand Prix
2023	Doha, Qatar	89 kg	165	170	~~175~~	6	205	211	223 WR	1st place, gold medalist(s)	393	1st place, gold medalist(s)
Youth World Championships
2019	Las Vegas, United States	73 kg	123	127	130	2nd place, silver medalist(s)	~~154~~	154	161	1st place, gold medalist(s)	291	1st place, gold medalist(s)
Youth World Cup Online
2020	Lima, Peru	81 kg	~~150~~	150	155	1st place, gold medalist(s)	180	190	—	1st place, gold medalist(s)	345	1st place, gold medalist(s)
European Youth Weightlifting Championships
2017	Pristina, Kosovo	56 kg	78	82	84	8	106	111	118	4	197	7
2018	San Donato Milanese, Italy	69 kg	105	109	113	1st place, gold medalist(s)	130	140	147	1st place, gold medalist(s)	260	1st place, gold medalist(s)
2019	Eilat, Israel	81 kg	125	133	140	1st place, gold medalist(s)	150	160	~~170~~	1st place, gold medalist(s)	300	1st place, gold medalist(s)

== Personal bests ==
On Video Lifts
On Video Lifts	Snatch	Clean & Jerk	Back Squat	Front Squat	Clean	Jerk
Lifted	188 kg	230 kg	290 kg	240 kg x2	230 kg	??
Event	2025 European Weightlifting Championships	2024 Bundesliga and the 2026 World Weightlifting Championships	Personal Instagram Post [24/06/2024]	Personal Instagram Post [28/11/2023]	Personal Instagram Post [15/06/2024]	
