= Romain Imadouchène =

French weightlifter (born 1995)

Personal information
- Born: 5 September 1995 (age 31) Saint-Pol-sur-Mer, France

Sport
- Country: France
- Sport: Weightlifting
- Club: CA Rosendael
- Coached by: Vencelas Dabaya
Medal record
Men's weightlifting
Representing France
European Championships
Bronze medal – third place	2022 Tirana	96 kg
Bronze medal – third place	2026 Batumi	94 kg

Romain Imadouchène (born 5 September 1995) is a French weightlifter. He competed in the men's 89 kg event at the 2024 Summer Olympics.

== Life and career ==
Imadouchène was born in Saint-Pol-sur-Mer. He took up weightlifting at the age of 15 after practising judo for 11 years.

In June 2022, Imadouchène won the bronze medal in the total and the gold medal in the Clean & Jerk at the European Championships in Tirana men's 96 kg.

In December 2022, he became world champion in the Clean & Jerk at the World championships in Bogota by lifting 213 kg. He was fourth in total with 378 kg.

In August 2024, Imadouchène competed in the men's 89 kg event at the 2024 Summer Olympics held in Paris, France. He lifted 351 kg in total and placed ninth.

== Major results ==
Year	Venue	Weight	Snatch (kg)				Clean & Jerk (kg)				Total	Rank
Year	Venue	Weight	1	2	3	Rank	1	2	3	Rank	Total	Rank
Olympic Games
2024	Paris, France	89 kg	~~155~~	155	~~161~~	—N/a	~~195~~	196	~~204~~	—N/a	351	9
World Championships
2017	Anaheim, United States	85 kg	153	~~157~~	~~157~~	8	191	196	~~202~~	3rd place, bronze medalist(s)	349	6
2019	Pattaya, Thailand	89 kg	153	~~157~~	~~157~~	18	~~199~~	~~199~~	200	6	353	13
2021	Tashkent, Uzbekistan	96 kg	155	160	~~163~~	17	205	210	212	6	372	9
2022	Bogotá, Colombia	96 kg	160	165	~~170~~	7	205	209	213	1st place, gold medalist(s)	378	4
2023	Riyadh, Saudi Arabia	89 kg	160	~~165~~	~~165~~	16	204	209	~~213~~	4	369	7
European Championships
2017	Split, Croatia	85 kg	~~152~~	152	~~157~~	9	187	~~194~~	~~194~~	10	339	9
2022	Tirana, Albania	96 kg	150	160	~~165~~	7	~~205~~	206	210	1st place, gold medalist(s)	370	3rd place, bronze medalist(s)
2026	Batumi, Georgia	94 kg	~~162~~	163	~~167~~	5	202	207	~~219~~	2nd place, silver medalist(s)	370	3rd place, bronze medalist(s)
