= Marin Robu =

Moldovan weightlifter (born 2000)

Personal information
- Born: 19 March 2000 (age 26) Nisporeni, Moldova
- Height: 176 cm (5 ft 9 in)
- Weight: 89 kg (196 lb)

Sport
- Country: Moldova
- Sport: Weightlifting
- Weight class: 73 kg; 81 kg; 89 kg
- Club: Şcoala Sportivă Specializată de Haltere Chișinău
- Coached by: Sergiu Cretu
Medal record
Men's weightlifting
Representing Moldova
World Championships
Bronze medal – third place	2021 Tashkent	81 kg
Bronze medal – third place	2024 Manama	89 kg
Bronze medal – third place	2025 Førde	88 kg
European Championships
Gold medal – first place	2026 Batumi	88 kg
Silver medal – second place	2021 Moscow	73 kg
Silver medal – second place	2025 Chișinău	89 kg
Bronze medal – third place	2023 Yerevan	89 kg
Bronze medal – third place	2024 Sofia	89 kg
IWF World Cup
Silver medal – second place	2020 Rome	73 kg

Marin Robu (born 19 March 2000) is a Moldovan weightlifter. He won the bronze medal in his event at the 2021 World Weightlifting Championships held in Tashkent, Uzbekistan. He is a four-time medalist at the European Weightlifting Championships. Robu represented Moldova at the 2020 Summer Olympics in Tokyo, Japan and the 2024 Summer Olympics in Paris, France.

== Career ==
In 2019, he won the silver medal in the men's junior 73 kg event at the European Junior & U23 Weightlifting Championships in Bucharest, Romania. A year later, he won the silver medal in the men's 73 kg event at the Roma 2020 World Cup in Rome, Italy.

In 2021, he won the silver medal in the men's 73 kg event at the European Weightlifting Championships held in Moscow, Russia.

He represented Moldova at the 2020 Summer Olympics in Tokyo, Japan. He competed in the men's 73 kg event and placed eighth. He suffered a back injury in training shortly before the competition, which hampered his performance in the Clean & Jerk.

He won the bronze medal in the men's 81 kg event at the 2021 World Weightlifting Championships held in Tashkent, Uzbekistan.

He also competed at the World Weightlifting Championships in 2018, 2019, 2022 and 2023.

In August 2024, Robu competed in the men's 89 kg event at the 2024 Summer Olympics held in Paris, France. He lifted 383 kg in total and placed fourth, missing out 1 kg on bronze medal.

== Achievements ==
Year	Venue	Weight	Snatch (kg)				Clean & Jerk (kg)				Total	Rank
Year	Venue	Weight	1	2	3	Rank	1	2	3	Rank	Total	Rank
Summer Olympics
2021	Tokyo, Japan	73 kg	150	155	~~159~~	—N/a	175	~~182~~	~~182~~	—N/a	330	8
2024	Paris, France	89 kg	170	175	—	—N/a	200	208	~~212~~	—N/a	383	4
World Championships
2018	Ashgabat, Turkmenistan	73 kg	133	137	~~140~~	25	~~158~~	158	~~164~~	35	295	34
2019	Pattaya, Thailand	73 kg	143	149	~~152~~	11	170	~~178~~	~~178~~	21	319	17
2021	Tashkent, Uzbekistan	81 kg	161	165	168	1st place, gold medalist(s)	190	195	~~198~~	5	363	3rd place, bronze medalist(s)
2022	Bogotá, Colombia	81 kg	161	~~165~~	~~165~~	4	190	~~197~~	~~197~~	7	351	4
2023	Riyadh, Saudi Arabia	89 kg	169	~~173~~	173	2nd place, silver medalist(s)	197	~~205~~	~~205~~	9	370	6
2024	Manama, Bahrain	89 kg	169	173	~~175~~	2nd place, silver medalist(s)	201	206	~~209~~	4	379	3rd place, bronze medalist(s)
2025	Førde, Norway	88 kg	169	~~174~~	~~174~~	3rd place, bronze medalist(s)	200	~~204~~	~~204~~	3rd place, bronze medalist(s)	369	3rd place, bronze medalist(s)
IWF World Cup
2020	Rome, Italy	73 kg	145	150	152	1st place, gold medalist(s)	170	176	180	1st place, gold medalist(s)	332	2nd place, silver medalist(s)
2024	Phuket, Thailand	89 kg	165	~~169~~	~~169~~	9	—	—	—	—	—	—
European Championships
2019	Batumi, Georgia	73 kg	140	145	148	5	168	173	~~176~~	8	321	7
2021	Moscow, Russia	73 kg	151	156	~~159~~	2nd place, silver medalist(s)	177	~~183~~	183	4	339	2nd place, silver medalist(s)
2022	Tirana, Albania	81 kg	~~160~~	—	—	—	—	—	—	—	—	—
2023	Yerevan, Armenia	89 kg	161	~~166~~	166	3rd place, bronze medalist(s)	193	198	~~201~~	4	364	3rd place, bronze medalist(s)
2024	Sofia, Bulgaria	89 kg	165	~~171~~	171	2nd place, silver medalist(s)	195	202	207	4	378	3rd place, bronze medalist(s)
2025	Chișinău, Moldova	89 kg	165	170	173	1st place, gold medalist(s)	195	202	~~205~~	2nd place, silver medalist(s)	375	2nd place, silver medalist(s)
2026	Batumi, Georgia	88 kg	168	~~169~~	173	1st place, gold medalist(s)	195	200	~~204~~	2nd place, silver medalist(s)	373	1st place, gold medalist(s)
