= 2026 World Weightlifting Championships – Men's 95 kg =

Men's 95 kg at the 2026 World Weightlifting Championships
- Venue: Ningbo Olympic Sports Center
- Location: Ningbo, China
- Dates: 4 November
- Competitors: 47 from 38 nations
- Winning total: 415 kg WR

Medalists
gold medal	Karlos Nasar	Bulgaria
silver medal	Nurgissa Adiletuly	Kazakhstan
bronze medal	Ali Alipour	Iran

The men's 95 kilograms competition at the 2026 World Weightlifting Championships was held on 4 November 2026.

== Schedule ==
Date	Time	Event
4 November 2026	11:00	Group D
4 November 2026	13:30	Group C
4 November 2026	16:00	Group B
4 November 2026	19:00	Group A

== Records ==
Prior to this competition, the existing world records were as follows.

World record	Snatch	World Standard	181 kg	—	1 August 2026
World record	Clean & Jerk	World Standard	220 kg	—	1 August 2026
World record	Total	Ali Alipour (IRI)	398 kg	Nagoya, Japan	28 September 2026

== Results ==
Rank	Athlete	Group	Snatch (kg)				Clean & Jerk (kg)				Total
Rank	Athlete	Group	1	2	3	Rank	1	2	3	Rank	Total
1st place, gold medalist(s)	Karlos Nasar (BUL)	A	175	180	185; WR	1st place, gold medalist(s)	213	220	230; WR	1st place, gold medalist(s)	415; WR
2nd place, silver medalist(s)	Nurgissa Adiletuly (KAZ)	A	175	180	182	2nd place, silver medalist(s)	212	217	~~224~~	2nd place, silver medalist(s)	399
3rd place, bronze medalist(s)	Ali Alipour (IRI)	A	176	181	~~184~~	3rd place, bronze medalist(s)	~~214~~	215	~~224~~	3rd place, bronze medalist(s)	396
4	Qian Feixiang (CHN)	A	172	~~177~~	~~177~~	5	~~206~~	206	213	5	385
5	Lee Seong-won (KOR)	A	~~165~~	165	171	6	205	~~213~~	214	4	385
6	Goga Jajvani (GEO)	A	167	~~171~~	173	4	196	202	~~208~~	11	375
7	Mukhammadkodir Toshtemirov (UZB)	B	~~166~~	166	~~170~~	10	199	204	207	7	373
8	Won Jong-beom (KOR)	B	163	~~167~~	~~167~~	19	205	210	~~217~~	6	373
9	Kianoush Rostami (KOS)	C	~~170~~	~~170~~	170	7	201	~~208~~	~~210~~	12	371
10	Keydomar Vallenilla (VEN)	A	~~165~~	~~165~~	165	16	205	~~209~~	—	9	370
11	Hamidreza Zarei (IRI)	B	~~160~~	161	~~167~~	22	206	~~213~~	~~213~~	8	367
12	Jokser Albornoz (BHR)	B	160	165	—	13	200	—	—	13	365
13	Fares El-Bakh (QAT)	A	160	~~165~~	~~165~~	26	205	—	—	10	365
14	Ramazan Dzhankhotov (RUS)	C	161	166	~~169~~	8	192	197	~~200~~	16	363
15	Daniel Kołecki (POL)	B	~~163~~	163	165	15	~~197~~	197	~~200~~	17	362
16	Alghafeer Ezzeddin (UAE)	C	160	165	~~168~~	11	190	~~195~~	195	20	360
17	Davit Hovhannisyan (ARM)	B	165	~~170~~	~~170~~	12	195	~~202~~	~~203~~	21	360
18	Masashi Nishikawa (JPN)	B	~~165~~	165	~~170~~	14	~~195~~	~~195~~	195	22	360
19	Mauricio Loaiza (VEN)	B	160	~~165~~	~~165~~	25	~~200~~	~~200~~	200	14	360
20	Maksym Dombrovskyi (UKR)	B	159	162	~~165~~	20	194	~~199~~	~~200~~	23	356
21	Armands Mežinskis (LAT)	C	153	158	161	21	192	~~197~~	~~198~~	24	353
22	Óscar Garcés (COL)	C	~~152~~	155	~~160~~	32	198	~~205~~	~~208~~	15	353
23	Saba Asanidze (GEO)	C	151	155	~~159~~	31	190	~~194~~	196	18	351
24	Kofsha Ertjan (ALB)	C	160	~~164~~	~~165~~	24	190	—	—	28	350
25	Jonathan Ramos (MEX)	D	145	150	153	34	~~190~~	190	195	19	348
26	Artūrs Vasiļonoks (LAT)	D	153	157	~~160~~	27	185	190	~~194~~	26	347
27	Huang Pin-hsun (TPE)	D	150	155	~~160~~	28	185	191	~~196~~	25	346
28	Bradyn Santavy (CAN)	C	~~155~~	155	~~159~~	33	190	~~195~~	~~197~~	27	345
29	Erik Guadamud (ESP)	D	150	~~157~~	163; WYR	18	180	~~188~~	—	34	343
30	Lukas Kordušas (LTU)	D	151	155	~~158~~	29	180	186	~~193~~	30	341
31	Alex Bellemarre (CAN)	C	155	~~159~~	~~159~~	30	~~185~~	185	~~191~~	31	340
32	Ilia Iudin (RUS)	C	~~152~~	152	~~156~~	36	188	~~192~~	~~194~~	29	340
33	Szilárd Fekécs (HUN)	D	140	147	~~150~~	38	180	184	—	32	331
34	Oliver Saxton (AUS)	D	145	150	~~155~~	37	180	~~185~~	~~185~~	33	330
35	Kyle Itsimaera (NRU)	D	~~130~~	~~130~~	130	39	160	~~170~~	~~170~~	35	290
36	Adam Gordon (JAM)	D	118	~~122~~	~~124~~	40	~~147~~	147	153	36	271
37	Will Said (AFG)	D	100	105	110	41	130	135	145	37	255
—	Ihar Lozka (BLR)	A	~~175~~	~~175~~	~~175~~	—	—	—	—	—	—
—	Yasser Salem (BIH)	A	~~163~~	~~163~~	~~163~~	—	—	—	—	—	—
—	Romain Imadouchène (FRA)	A	~~160~~	~~160~~	~~160~~	—	~~205~~	~~208~~	—	—	—
—	Ramiro Mora Romero (WRT)	B	~~160~~	160	164	17	~~205~~	~~207~~	~~207~~	—	—
—	Michał Jaworski (POL)	B	~~160~~	~~160~~	—	—	~~195~~	~~195~~	~~195~~	—	—
—	Rüstem Annaberdiýew (TKM)	B	~~160~~	~~160~~	~~161~~	—	~~192~~	~~194~~	~~194~~	—	—
—	Juan Guadamud (ECU)	B	160	166	~~171~~	9	~~200~~	~~200~~	~~200~~	—	—
—	Antonio Govea (MEX)	C	~~152~~	152	~~158~~	35	~~183~~	~~185~~	~~185~~	—	—
—	Ali Al-Othman (KSA)	C	~~152~~	~~152~~	~~152~~	—	—	—	—	—	—
—	Norwin Washington (NCA)	D	154	160	~~165~~	23	~~183~~	~~183~~	~~185~~	—	—
—	Forrester Osei (GHA)	D	Did not start								
