= 2021 World Weightlifting Championships – Men's 81 kg =

Weightlifting Championship

The men's 81 kilograms competition at the 2021 World Weightlifting Championships was held on 11 and 12 December 2021.

== Schedule ==
Date	Time	Event
11 December 2021	13:00	Group C
12 December 2021	13:00	Group B
12 December 2021	19:00	Group A

== Medalists ==
Event	Gold		Silver		Bronze	
Snatch	Marin Robu (MDA)	168 kg	Karlos Nasar (BUL)	166 kg	Mirmostafa Javadi (IRI)	163 kg
Clean & Jerk	Karlos Nasar (BUL)	208 kg	Mirmostafa Javadi (IRI)	204 kg	Kim Woo-jae (KOR)	196 kg
Total	Karlos Nasar (BUL)	374 kg	Mirmostafa Javadi (IRI)	367 kg	Marin Robu (MDA)	363 kg

== Records ==
Prior to this competition, the existing world records were as follows.

World Record	Snatch	Li Dayin (CHN)	175 kg	Tashkent, Uzbekistan	21 April 2021
World Record	Clean & Jerk	Lü Xiaojun (CHN)	207 kg	Pattaya, Thailand	22 September 2019
World Record	Total	Lü Xiaojun (CHN)	378 kg	Pattaya, Thailand	22 September 2019

== Results ==
Rank	Athlete	Group	Snatch (kg)				Clean & Jerk (kg)				Total
Rank	Athlete	Group	1	2	3	Rank	1	2	3	Rank	Total
1st place, gold medalist(s)	Karlos Nasar (BUL)	A	163	166	~~169~~	2nd place, silver medalist(s)	200	205	208 WR	1st place, gold medalist(s)	374 CJWR
2nd place, silver medalist(s)	Mirmostafa Javadi (IRI)	A	155	159	163	3rd place, bronze medalist(s)	193	198	204	2nd place, silver medalist(s)	367
3rd place, bronze medalist(s)	Marin Robu (MDA)	A	161	165	168	1st place, gold medalist(s)	190	195	~~198~~	5	363
4	Kim Woo-jae (KOR)	A	~~159~~	162	~~164~~	4	191	196	~~202~~	3rd place, bronze medalist(s)	358
5	Brayan Rodallegas (COL)	A	~~158~~	158	162	5	191	195	~~200~~	6	357
6	Viacheslav Iarkin (RWF)	A	155	160	~~163~~	8	188	~~193~~	196	4	356
7	Şatlyk Şöhradow (TKM)	A	157	161	~~164~~	6	~~190~~	190	~~194~~	9	351
8	Rafik Harutyunyan (ARM)	A	153	158	~~161~~	9	191	~~196~~	~~201~~	8	349
9	Mukhammadkodir Toshtemirov (UZB)	A	157	~~162~~	~~164~~	10	180	~~192~~	192	7	349
10	Andrés Mata (ESP)	B	150	~~154~~	155	12	182	186	189	10	344
11	Nonthaphat Thaneewan (THA)	B	149	154	156	11	181	184	187	11	343
12	Iván Escudero (ECU)	B	143	147	~~150~~	14	177	180	—	12	327
13	Ajay Singh (IND)	C	138	143	147	13	~~167~~	167	175	16	322
14	Natthawut Suepsuan (THA)	B	145	~~148~~	~~148~~	15	176	~~180~~	~~180~~	14	321
15	Kyle Bruce (AUS)	B	~~140~~	140	~~145~~	17	~~175~~	176	~~183~~	15	316
16	Seán Brown (IRL)	B	~~139~~	~~140~~	140	18	166	171	~~175~~	17	311
17	Chinthana Vidanage (SRI)	C	127	132	134	19	160	166	~~170~~	18	300
18	Michel Ngongang (CMR)	C	127	~~130~~	~~130~~	21	157	162	~~166~~	19	289
19	Amar Musić (CRO)	C	125	~~130~~	130	20	150	~~155~~	155	20	285
20	Goran Ćetković (CRO)	C	115	120	~~126~~	24	~~145~~	145	151	21	271
21	Omarie Mears (JAM)	C	115	120	125	22	~~140~~	141	~~145~~	23	266
22	Vincentas Skirka (LTU)	C	115	120	~~123~~	23	136	~~141~~	143	22	263
23	Anton Micallef (MLT)	C	~~114~~	~~114~~	114	26	136	~~141~~	~~142~~	24	250
24	Maurice Oduor (KEN)	C	105	110	114	25	~~135~~	135	~~142~~	25	249
25	Geoffrey Oduor (KEN)	C	~~90~~	90	95	27	120	~~125~~	~~126~~	26	215
—	Mohamed Ehab (EGY)	A	160	~~164~~	~~164~~	7	—	—	—	—	—
—	Hsieh Meng-en (TPE)	B	140	145	~~150~~	16	~~180~~	~~180~~	~~180~~	—	—
—	Vitalii Smochek (UKR)	B	~~146~~	~~146~~	~~146~~	—	175	~~180~~	180	13	—
—	Morteza Biglari (IRI)	B	~~146~~	~~146~~	~~146~~	—	—	—	—	—	—

== New records ==
Clean & Jerk	208 kg	Karlos Nasar (BUL)	WR
