= Weightlifting at the 2024 Summer Olympics – Men's 89 kg =

Men's 89 kg at the Games of the XXXIII Olympiad
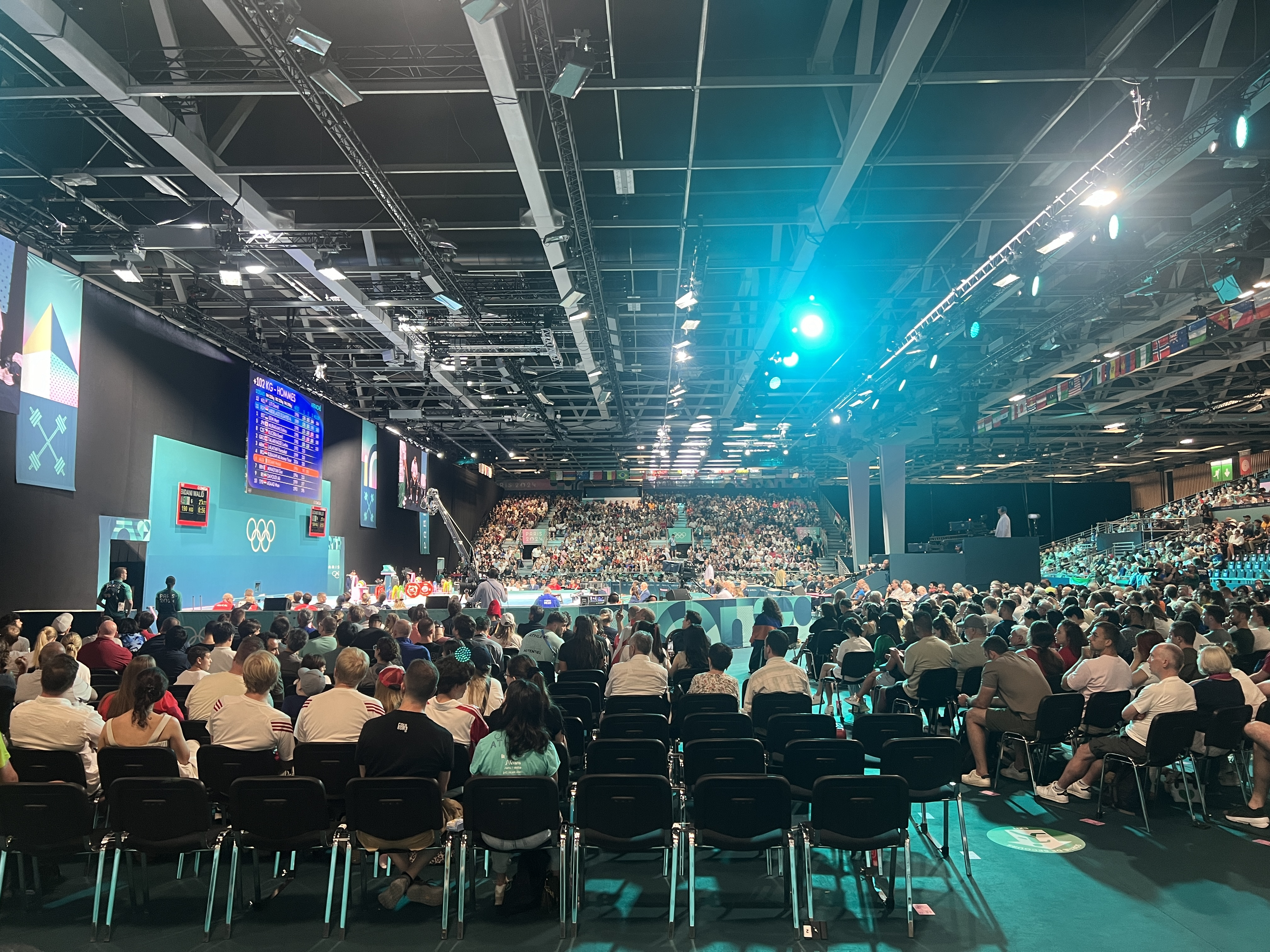
- Interior of the Paris Expo Porte de Versailles
- Venue: Paris Expo Porte de Versailles
- Date: 9 August 2024
- Competitors: 12 from 12 nations

Medalists
1st place, gold medalist(s)		Karlos Nasar	Bulgaria
2nd place, silver medalist(s)		Yeison López	Colombia
3rd place, bronze medalist(s)		Antonino Pizzolato	Italy

The men's 89 kg weightlifting competition at the 2024 Summer Olympics was held on 9 August at the Paris Expo Porte de Versailles.

Due to the restructuring of new weight categories, the men's 81 kg category of the previous games was replaced by the men's 89 kg category. Going into the competition, Karlos Nasar of Bulgaria was the favourite, while snatch world record holder Yeison López and 2023 World Champion Mirmostafa Javadi of Iran were also among the top contenders. Total world record holder Li Dayin had been among the top contenders, but missed the event due to the Chinese team not selecting him. In the final, Nasar won gold with a new world record total of 404 kilograms, followed by López with silver and Antonino Pizzolato of Italy with bronze.

== Background ==
On 14 June 2022, the International Weightlifting Federation (IWF) officially announced the new weight categories for the 2024 Summer Olympics, with the total medal count reduced from fourteen to ten. The men's 81 kg category of the last games, which was won by Lü Xiaojun, was replaced by the men's 89 kg category. Around two weeks before the announcement of the restructuring of categories, Antonino Pizzolato broke the world records for the clean and jerk at 217 kilograms and total at 392 kilograms at the 2022 European Weightlifting Championships.

At the 2022 World Weightlifting Championships, the first eligible event during the qualification timeline, Keydomar Vallenilla placed first as the first Venezuelan world champion in the sport. Karlos Nasar failed all of his snatch attempts in the competition but set a new world record in the clean and jerk with 220 kilograms. Nasar then competed at the 2023 European Weightlifting Championships and placed first, breaking the world record in the clean and jerk with 221 kilograms and the total with 395 kilograms. At the 2023 Asian Weightlifting Championships, Tian Tao of China broke the world record in the clean and jerk with 222 kilograms but his teammate Li Dayin placed first with a new snatch world record of 180 kilograms and total world record of 396 kilograms. At the 2023 World Weightlifting Championships, Mirmostafa Javadi placed first in the category, with the Tehran Times calling it an "unexpected performance".

At the last competition for 2023, Nasar placed first at the 2023 IWF Grand Prix II, breaking Tian's world record in the clean and jerk with 223 kilograms. The 2024 IWF World Cup was the last competition during the qualification period. Nasar set a world record in the snatch with 181 kilograms before it was broken by Yeison López with 182 kilograms. Nasar placed first, equaling Li's total world record with 396 kilograms.

Sports Illustrated predicted that Nasar would win, followed by López in second and Javadi in third. Although Li was the world record holder in the total and a medal favourite for the category, he was not selected to be part of the Olympic team.

=== Qualification ===
Qualification for every event had spots for at least twelve weightlifters coming from different National Olympic Committees (NOC). Qualification spots were eligible for the ten highest-ranked weightlifters in the IWF Olympic Qualification Ranking, the highest-ranked weightlifter representing an NOC whose continent lies outside the top ten (IWF Olympic Continental Qualification Ranking), the host nation's reserved entry and a universality place. If a spot was still available once every continent was represented in the top ten, the host nation did not send an entry, a universality place was not used, or any combination of the following, the quota place was allocated to the next highest-ranked eligible weightlifter.

To be eligible for the event, all weightlifters must have competed at the 2023 World Weightlifting Championships in Riyadh, 2024 IWF World Cup in Phuket, and in at least three qualifying tournaments. Apart from two compulsory events, the host country France and those eligible for universality places may have competed in a minimum of two qualifying tournaments. For the men's 89 kg category, twelve athletes qualified for the event with the absence of a universality place. Petr Asayonak was originally in the top 10 but was replaced by Boady Santavy due to his ineligibility to compete.

Qualified weightlifters
Weightlifter	Country	Total (kg)	Qualification
Karlos Nasar	Bulgaria	396	Ranking
Yeison López	Colombia	392	Ranking
Keydomar Vallenilla	Venezuela	385	Ranking
Mirmostafa Javadi	Iran	384	Ranking
Karim Abokahla	Egypt	381	Ranking
Antonino Pizzolato	Italy	380	Ranking
Marin Robu	Moldova	378	Ranking
Andranik Karapetyan	Armenia	377	Ranking
Yu Dong-ju	South Korea	375	Ranking
Boady Santavy	Canada	372	Reallocation
Kyle Bruce	Australia	336	Continental ranking
Romain Imadouchène	France	—	Host entry

=== Records ===
The world records before the competition were the snatch that was set by López at the 2024 IWF World Cup, the clean and jerk set by Nasar at the 2023 IWF Grand Prix II, and the total set by Li at the 2023 Asian Weightlifting Championships. As the event was new to the Olympic program, only the Olympic standards of 180 kilograms in the snatch, 212 kilograms in the clean and jerk, and 390 kilograms in the total, stood.

Records before the competition
World Record	Snatch	Yeison López (COL)	182 kg	Phuket, Thailand	6 April 2024
World Record	Clean & Jerk	Karlos Nasar (BUL)	223 kg	Doha, Qatar	10 December 2023
World Record	Total	Li Dayin (CHN)	396 kg	Jinju, South Korea	10 May 2023
Olympic Record	Snatch	Olympic Standard	180 kg	—	
Olympic Record	Clean & Jerk	Olympic Standard	212 kg	—	
Olympic Record	Total	Olympic Standard	390 kg	—	

== Results ==
The event was held on 9 August, starting at 3:00 p.m., at the Paris Expo Porte de Versailles. Bruce had the lightest snatch of the event at 148 kilograms while Nasar and López tied with the highest with 180 kilograms; Robu had the second-heaviest snatch with 175 kilograms. Santavy and Abokahla were then eliminated in the clean and jerk, with the former failing all of his attempts and the latter pulling out of the competition after the snatches. Bruce had the lightest clean and jerk of the event at 182 kilograms while Nasar lifted 224 kilograms as the heaviest of the event, setting a new world record; López had the third-heaviest clean and jerk of the event at 210 kilograms while Pizzolato had the second-heaviest at 212 kilograms. With a total of 404 kilograms, Nasar won the Olympic title and broke the world record in the total. López and Pizzolato placed second and third, respectively.

Pizzolato's bronze medal was called controversial by Jake Dickson of BarBend, a writer for the official media partner of USA Weightlifting, due to the jury revalidating his attempt after initially considering it as a failed attempt, thus placing him over Robu in the event. The organization cited the arm-bend rule, where an athlete should not press the bar after the jerk, which should result in a failed lift. Robu and the Moldovan Weightlifting Federation filed a case to the Court of Arbitration for Sport regarding the matter, with the Moldovan government allocating 1.8 million lei to support the initiative.

Rank	Athlete	Nation	Snatch (kg)				Clean & Jerk (kg)				Total
Rank	Athlete	Nation	1	2	3	Result	1	2	3	Result	Total
1st place, gold medalist(s)	Karlos Nasar	Bulgaria	173	177	180	180	213	224	—	224 WR, OR	404 WR, OR
2nd place, silver medalist(s)	Yeison López	Colombia	175	~~180~~	180	180	~~205~~	205	210	210	390
3rd place, bronze medalist(s)	Antonino Pizzolato	Italy	~~172~~	172	~~176~~	172	~~212~~	~~212~~	212	212	384
4	Marin Robu	Moldova	170	175	—	175	200	208	~~212~~	208	383
5	Mirmostafa Javadi	Iran	164	168	~~171~~	168	204	~~217~~	~~217~~	204	372
6	Yu Dong-ju	South Korea	~~163~~	163	168	168	203	~~211~~	~~217~~	203	371
7	Andranik Karapetyan	Armenia	170	~~175~~	~~177~~	170	200	~~210~~	~~215~~	200	370
8	Keydomar Vallenilla	Venezuela	157	162	~~165~~	162	190	196	~~200~~	196	358
9	Romain Imadouchène	France	~~155~~	155	~~161~~	155	~~195~~	196	~~204~~	196	351
10	Kyle Bruce	Australia	143	~~148~~	148	148	~~182~~	182	~~188~~	182	330
—	Boady Santavy	Canada	158	163	~~166~~	163	~~186~~	~~187~~	~~188~~	—	DNF
—	Karim Abokahla	Egypt	165	~~170~~	~~170~~	165	—	—	—	—	DNF
