= 2024 in weightlifting =

- Full IWF Calendar here

== Olympic Games ==
- July 26 – August 11: 2024 Summer Olympics in (France) Paris

== World Weightlifting championships ==
- May 22–26: 2024 Youth World Weightlifting Championships in (Peru) Lima
- September 19–27: 2024 Junior World Weightlifting Championships in (Spain) León
- December 4–14: 2024 World Weightlifting Championships in (Bahrain) Manama

== Continental & Regional weightlifting championships ==
- February 2–10: 2024 African Weightlifting Championships in (Egypt) Ismailia

  - Men's 55 kg: No competition
  - Men's 61 kg: (Egypt) Abdelrahman Ibrahim Mansour
  - Men's 67 kg: (Algeria) Akram Chekhchoukh
  - Men's 73 kg: (Tunisia) Karem Ben Hnia
  - Men's 81 kg: (Egypt) Abdelrahman Younes Elsayed
  - Men's 89 kg: (Egypt) Karim Abokahla
  - Men's 96 kg: (Libya) Ahmed Abuzriba
  - Men's 102 kg: (Egypt) Yasser Salem
  - Men's 109 kg: (Egypt) Ragab Abdella
  - Men's 109 kg+: (Morocco) Bilal Bouamr
  - Women's 45 kg: (Algeria) Nadia Katbi
  - Women's 49 kg: (Madagascar) Rosina Randafiarison
  - Women's 55 kg: (Tunisia) Eya Aoudi
  - Women's 59 kg: (Nigeria) Rafiatu Lawal
  - Women's 64 kg: (Tunisia) Chaima Rahmouni
  - Women's 71 kg: (Nigeria) Joy Ogbonne Eze
  - Women's 76 kg: (Egypt) Neama Said
  - Women's 81 kg: (Egypt) Sara Ahmed
  - Women's 87 kg: (Egypt) Fatma Ahmed
  - Women's 87 kg+: (Egypt) Halima Abbas

- February 3–10: 2024 Asian Weightlifting Championships in (Uzbekistan) Tashkent

  - Men's 55 kg: (North Korea) Pang Un Chol
  - Men's 61 kg: (North Korea) Pak Myong Jin
  - Men's 67 kg: (North Korea) Ri Won-ju
  - Men's 73 kg: (Indonesia) Rahmat Erwin Abdullah
  - Men's 81 kg: (North Korea) Ri Chong Song
  - Men's 89 kg: (Iran) Ali Alipour
  - Men's 96 kg: (South Korea) Won Jong-Beom
  - Men's 102 kg: (Uzbekistan) Akbar Djuraev
  - Men's 109 kg: (Uzbekistan) Ruslan Nurudinov
  - Men's 109 kg+: (Syria) Man Asaad
  - Women's 45 kg: (North Korea) Won Hyon Sim
  - Women's 49 kg: (North Korea) Ri Song-gum
  - Women's 55 kg: (North Korea) Kang Hyon Gong
  - Women's 59 kg: (North Korea) Kim Il Gyong
  - Women's 64 kg: (North Korea) Ri Suk
  - Women's 71 kg: (North Korea) Song Kuk Hyang
  - Women's 76 kg: (North Korea) Jong Chun-hui
  - Women's 81 kg: (South Korea) Kim Su-hyeon
  - Women's 87 kg: (South Korea) Yun Ha Je
  - Women's 87 kg+: (South Korea) Park Hye-jeong

- February 12–20: 2024 European Weightlifting Championships in (Bulgaria) Sofia

  - Men's 55 kg: (Bulgaria) Angel Rusev
  - Men's 61 kg: (Bulgaria) Gabriel Marinov
  - Men's 67 kg: (Armenia) Gor Sahakyan
  - Men's 73 kg: (Bulgaria) Bozhidar Andreev
  - Men's 81 kg: (Italy) Oscar Reyes
  - Men's 89 kg: (Bulgaria) Karlos Nasar
  - Men's 96 kg: (Armenia) Hakob Mkrtchyan
  - Men's 102 kg: Yauheni Tsikhantsou
  - Men's 109 kg: (Azerbaijan) Dadash Dadashbayli
  - Men's 109 kg+: (Armenia) Varazdat Lalayan
  - Women's 45 kg: (Turkey) Cansu Bektaş
  - Women's 49 kg: (Romania) Mihaela Cambei
  - Women's 55 kg: (Armenia) Aleksandra Grigoryan
  - Women's 59 kg: (Ukraine) Kamila Konotop
  - Women's 64 kg: (Ukraine) Hanna Davydova
  - Women's 71 kg: (Romania) Loredana Toma
  - Women's 76 kg: (Italy) Genna Toko Kegne
  - Women's 81 kg: (Poland) Weronika Zielińska-Stubińska
  - Women's 87 kg: (Norway) Solfrid Koanda
  - Women's 87 kg+: (United Kingdom) Emily Campbell

- February 21–25: 2024 Oceania Weightlifting Championships in (New Zealand) Auckland

  - Men's 55 kg: (Papua New Guinea) Gahuna Ian Nauari
  - Men's 61 kg: (Papua New Guinea) Morea Baru
  - Men's 67 kg: (Samoa) Vaipava Ioane
  - Men's 73 kg: (Samoa) John Tafi
  - Men's 81 kg: (Nauru) Marcincy Cook
  - Men's 89 kg: (Australia) Kyle Bruce
  - Men's 96 kg: (Samoa) Maeu Nanai Livi
  - Men's 102 kg: (Samoa) Don Opeloge
  - Men's 109 kg: (New Zealand) Kitini Taihuka
  - Men's 109 kg+: (New Zealand) David Liti
  - Women's 45 kg: (Papua New Guinea) Thelma Toua
  - Women's 49 kg: (Papua New Guinea) Dika Toua
  - Women's 55 kg: (Solomon Islands) Jenly Tegu Wini
  - Women's 59 kg: (Australia) Kiana Elliott
  - Women's 64 kg: (Nauru) Femily-Crystie Notte
  - Women's 71 kg: (Australia) Sarah Cochrane
  - Women's 76 kg: (Samoa) Avatu Opeloge
  - Women's 81 kg: (New Zealand) Hayley Whiting
  - Women's 87 kg: (New Zealand) Medea Jones
  - Women's 87 kg+: (Samoa) Iuniarra Sipaia

- February 21–25: 2024 Oceania Junior & Youth Weightlifting Championships in (New Zealand) Auckland

Junior

  - Men's 55 kg: (Nauru) Johannes Adam
  - Men's 61 kg: (Papua New Guinea) Kevau Baru
  - Men's 67 kg: (Nauru) Ditto Titus Ika
  - Men's 73 kg: (Fiji) Nehemiah Elder
  - Men's 81 kg: (Samoa) Tovio Ah Chonmg
  - Men's 89 kg: (Samoa) Emmanuel Ulimasao
  - Men's 96 kg: (Australia) Taj Marsh
  - Men's 102 kg: (Fiji) Suliano Koro Tuqalau
  - Men's 109 kg: No competition
  - Men's 109 kg+: (New Zealand) Numi Tepulolo
  - Women's 45 kg: (Papua New Guinea) Bede D. Igo
  - Women's 49 kg: (Australia) Celine Huynh
  - Women's 55 kg: (Nauru) My-Only Stephen
  - Women's 59 kg: (Australia) Ashley Kolomoisky
  - Women's 64 kg: (Nauru) Femily-Crystie Notte
  - Women's 71 kg: (New Zealand) Olivia Selemaia
  - Women's 76 kg: (Samoa) Avatu Opeloge
  - Women's 81 kg: (Fiji) Elizabeth Loi Waqavou
  - Women's 87 kg: (New Zealand) Litia Nacagilevu
  - Women's 87 kg+: (Fiji) Sinate Savou

Youth

  - Men's 49 kg: (Papua New Guinea) Lawrence Ravaoala
  - Men's 55 kg: (Nauru) Johannes Adam
  - Men's 61 kg: (Solomon Islands) Freeman Aumalefo Hale
  - Men's 67 kg: No competition
  - Men's 73 kg: (Fiji) Nehemiah Elder
  - Men's 81 kg: (Samoa) Tovio Ah Chonmg
  - Men's 89 kg: (Nauru) Kyle Franklin Itsimaera
  - Men's 96 kg: (Fiji) Zion Tokona
  - Men's 102 kg: (Fiji) Suliano Koro Tuqalau
  - Men's 102 kg+: (New Zealand) Isyss Schuster
  - Women's 40 kg: (Papua New Guinea) Ani Geua Gavera
  - Women's 45 kg: (Australia) Sienna Lambert
  - Women's 49 kg: (Australia) Celine Huynh
  - Women's 55 kg: (Australia) Lara Perry
  - Women's 59 kg: (Fiji) Claris T. Turanivalu
  - Women's 64 kg: (Nauru) Femily-Crystie Notte
  - Women's 71 kg: (Australia) Samantha Walker
  - Women's 76 kg: (Fiji) Keren Vulaca
  - Women's 81 kg: No competition
  - Women's 81 kg+: (New Zealand) Mollie King

- February 23–29: 2024 Pan American Weightlifting Championships in (Venezuela) Caracas

  - Men's 55 kg: (Mexico) Juan Barco
  - Men's 61 kg: (Colombia) Héctor Viveros
  - Men's 67 kg: (Colombia) Luis Cano
  - Men's 73 kg: (Colombia) Luis Javier Mosquera
  - Men's 81 kg: (Colombia) Edwin Lagarejo
  - Men's 89 kg: (Colombia) Yeison López
  - Men's 96 kg: (Venezuela) Keydomar Vallenilla
  - Men's 102 kg: (Venezuela) Jeyson Arias
  - Men's 109 kg: (Colombia) Yeimar Mendoza
  - Men's 109 kg+: (Colombia) Rafael Cerro
  - Women's 45 kg: (Venezuela) Victoria Tovar
  - Women's 49 kg: (Mexico) Ana López
  - Women's 55 kg: (Canada) Josée Gallant
  - Women's 59 kg: (Venezuela) Anyelin Venegas
  - Women's 64 kg: (Colombia) Rosivé Silgado
  - Women's 71 kg: (Ecuador) Angie Palacios
  - Women's 76 kg: (Colombia) Hellen Escobar
  - Women's 81 kg: (Ecuador) Neisi Dájomes
  - Women's 87 kg: (Venezuela) Dayana Chirinos
  - Women's 87 kg+: (Ecuador) Lisseth Ayoví

- March 9–15: 2023 African Games in (Ghana) Accra

  - Men's 55 kg: (Madagascar) Éric Andriantsitohaina
  - Men's 61 kg: (Egypt) Aly Elsayed
  - Men's 67 kg: (Nigeria) Edidiong Umoafia
  - Men's 73 kg: (Algeria) Samir Fardjallah
  - Men's 81 kg: (Tunisia) Hamza Ben Amor
  - Men's 89 kg: (Egypt) Eslam Abouelwafa
  - Men's 96 kg: (Egypt) Karim Abokahla
  - Men's 102 kg: (Egypt) Ahmed Sayed
  - Men's 109 kg: (Cameroon) Ngadja Junior
  - Men's 109 kg+: (Egypt) Abdelrahman El-Sayed
  - Women's 45 kg: (Egypt) Basma Ramadan
  - Women's 49 kg: (Ghana) Winnifred Ntumi
  - Women's 55 kg: (Nigeria) Adijat Olarinoye
  - Women's 59 kg: (Nigeria) Rafiatu Lawal
  - Women's 64 kg: (Nigeria) Ruth Ayodele
  - Women's 71 kg: (Nigeria) Joy Ogbonne Eze
  - Women's 76 kg: (Mauritius) Ketty Lent
  - Women's 81 kg: (Egypt) Sara Ahmed
  - Women's 87 kg: (Egypt) Fatma Mahmoud
  - Women's 87 kg+: (Egypt) Shimaa Khaled

- June 15–24: 2024 Micronesian Games in (Marshall Islands) Majuro
- June 15–22: 2024 European Youth Weightlifting Championships in (Greece) Thessaloniki
- June 19–25: 2024 Pan American Junior Weightlifting Championships in (Colombia) Palmira
- August 26 – September 2: 2024 Pan American Youth Weightlifting Championships in (Ecuador) Guayaquil
- September 3–8: 1st East Asian Weightlifting Championships in (South Korea) Seocheon
- September 17–21: 2024 Commonwealth Senior, Junior & Youth Weightlifting Championships in (Fiji) Suva
- September 29 – October 5: 2024 Asian Youth & Junior Weightlifting Championships in (Philippines) TBD
- November 21–30: 2021 Asian Indoor and Martial Arts Games in (Thailand) Chonburi
- October 26 – November 3: 2024 European Junior Weightlifting Championships in (Poland) Raszyn
- November 29 – December 9: 2024 Bolivarian Games in (Peru) Ayacucho

== IWF World Cup ==
- March 31– April 11: 2024 IWF World Cup in (Thailand) Phuket

  - Men's 55 kg: (North Korea) Pang Un-chol
  - Men's 61 kg: (China) Li Fabin
  - Men's 67 kg: (North Korea) Ri Won-ju
  - Men's 73 kg: (Indonesia) Rizki Juniansyah
  - Men's 81 kg: (North Korea) Ri Chong-song
  - Men's 89 kg: (Bulgaria) Karlos Nasar
  - Men's 96 kg: (South Korea) Won Jeong-bom
  - Men's 102 kg: (China) Liu Huanhua
  - Men's 109 kg: (Uzbekistan) Akbar Djuraev
  - Men's 109 kg+: (Armenia) Varazdat Lalayan
  - Women's 45 kg: (North Korea) Won Hyon-sim
  - Women's 49 kg: (North Korea) Ri Song-gum
  - Women's 55 kg: (North Korea) Kang Hyon-gong
  - Women's 59 kg: (China) Luo Shifang
  - Women's 64 kg: (North Korea) Rim Un-sim
  - Women's 71 kg: (United States) Olivia Reeves
  - Women's 76 kg: (North Korea) Jong Chun-hui
  - Women's 81 kg: (Ecuador) Neisi Dájomes
  - Women's 87 kg: (Norway) Solfrid Koanda
  - Women's 87 kg+: (China) Li Wenwen
