= List of Italian records in Olympic weightlifting =

The following are the national records in Olympic weightlifting in Italy. Records are maintained in each weight class for the snatch lift, clean and jerk lift, and the total for both lifts by the Italian Weightlifting Federation (Federazione Italiana Pesistica).

== Current records ==
=== Men ===
| Event | Record | Athlete | Date | Meet | Place | Ref |
60 kg
| Snatch | 125 kg | Standard | | | | |
| Clean & Jerk | 150 kg | Standard | | | | |
| Total | 275 kg | Standard | | | | |
65 kg
| Snatch | 137 kg | Standard | | | | |
| Clean & Jerk | 172 kg | Standard | | | | |
| Total | 309 kg | Standard | | | | |
70 kg
| Snatch | 130 kg | Sergio Massidda | 13 June 2026 | Italian Championships | Bari, Italy | |
| Clean & Jerk | 160 kg | Sergio Massidda | 13 June 2026 | Italian Championships | Bari, Italy | |
| Total | 290 kg | Sergio Massidda | 13 June 2026 | Italian Championships | Bari, Italy | |
75 kg
| Snatch | 128 kg | Manuel Mannironi | 13 June 2026 | Italian Championships | Bari, Italy | |
| Clean & Jerk | 160 kg | Giampiero Ingrande | 3 November 2025 | European Junior Championships | Durrës, Albania | |
| Total | 285 kg | Giampiero Ingrande | 3 November 2025 | European Junior Championships | Durrës, Albania | |
85 kg
| Snatch | 162 kg | Antonino Pizzolato | 30 November 2017 | World Championships | Anaheim, United States | |
| Clean & Jerk | 202 kg | Antonino Pizzolato | 24 November 2015 | World Championships | Houston, United States | |
| Total | 363 kg | Antonino Pizzolato | 24 November 2015 | World Championships | Houston, United States | |
95 kg
| Snatch | 162 kg | Lorenzo Tarquini | 2 September 2026 | Mediterranean Games | San Giorgio Ionico, Italy | |
| Clean & Jerk | 198 kg | Lorenzo Tarquini | 7 October 2025 | World Championships | Førde, Norway | |
| Total | 357 kg | Lorenzo Tarquini | 7 October 2025 | World Championships | Førde, Norway | |
110 kg
| Snatch | 180 kg | Standard | | | | |
| Clean & Jerk | 220 kg | Standard | | | | |
| Total | 400 kg | Standard | | | | |
+110 kg
| Snatch | 185 kg | Standard | | | | |
| Clean & Jerk | 225 kg | Standard | | | | |
| Total | 410 kg | Standard | | | | |

=== Women ===
| Event | Record | Athlete | Date | Meet | Place | Ref |
49 kg
| Snatch | 85 kg | Giulia Imperio | 23 May 2021 | World Junior Championships | Tashkent, Uzbekistan | |
| Clean & Jerk | 103 kg | Giorgia Russo | 6 April 2019 | European Championships | Batumi, Georgia | |
| Total | 185 kg | Giulia Imperio | 5 December 2023 | IWF Grand Prix | Doha, Qatar | |
53 kg
| Snatch | 86 kg | Genny Pagliaro | 9 March 2008 | Italian Junior Championships | Rome, Italy | |
| Clean & Jerk | 108 kg | Jennifer Lombardo | 24 June 2018 | Mediterranean Games | Tarragona, Spain | |
| Total | 193 kg | Jennifer Lombardo | 24 June 2018 | Mediterranean Games | Tarragona, Spain | |
57 kg
| Snatch | 91 kg | Celine Ludovica Delia | 1 May 2025 | World Junior Championships | Lima, Peru | |
| Clean & Jerk | 114 kg | Celine Ludovica Delia | 1 May 2025 | World Junior Championships | Lima, Peru | |
| Total | 205 kg | Celine Ludovica Delia | 1 May 2025 | World Junior Championships | Lima, Peru | |
61 kg
| Snatch | 101 kg | Lucrezia Magistris | 13 June 2026 | Italian Championships | Bari, Italy | |
| Clean & Jerk | 120 kg | Martina Chiacchio | 31 August 2026 | Mediterranean Games | San Giorgio Ionico, Italy | |
| Total | 212 kg | Noemi Filippazzo | 13 December 2025 | Italian Championships | Rome, Italy | |
| Total | 218 kg | Martina Chiacchio | 31 August 2026 | Mediterranean Games | San Giorgio Ionico, Italy | |
69 kg
| Snatch | 105 kg | Giorgia Bordignon | 25 February 2018 | Italian Championships | Rome, Italy | |
| Clean & Jerk | 127 kg | Giorgia Bordignon | 25 February 2018 | Italian Championships | Rome, Italy | |
| Total | 232 kg | Giorgia Bordignon | 25 February 2018 | Italian Championships | Rome, Italy | |
77 kg
| Snatch | 106 kg | Genna Toko Kegne | 14 June 2026 | Italian Championships | Bari, Italy | |
| Clean & Jerk | 134 kg | Genna Toko Kegne | 8 October 2025 | World Championships | Førde, Norway | |
| Total | 237 kg | Genna Toko Kegne | 8 October 2025 | World Championships | Førde, Norway | |
86 kg
| Snatch | 107 kg | Standard | | | | |
| Clean & Jerk | 132 kg | Standard | | | | |
| Total | 239 kg | Standard | | | | |
+86 kg
| Snatch | 108 kg | Standard | | | | |
| Clean & Jerk | 133 kg | Standard | | | | |
| Total | 241 kg | Standard | | | | |

== Historical records ==
=== Men (2018–2025) ===
| Event | Record | Athlete | Date | Meet | Place | Ref |
55 kg
| Snatch | 116 kg | Mirco Scarantino | 6 April 2019 | European Championships | Batumi, Georgia | |
| Clean & Jerk | 145 kg | Mirco Scarantino | 6 April 2019 | European Championships | Batumi, Georgia | |
| Total | 261 kg | Mirco Scarantino | 6 April 2019 | European Championships | Batumi, Georgia | |
61 kg
| Snatch | 137 kg | Sergio Massidda | 6 September 2023 | World Championships | Riyadh, Saudi Arabia | |
| Clean & Jerk | 165 kg | Sergio Massidda | 6 September 2023 | World Championships | Riyadh, Saudi Arabia | |
| Total | 302 kg | Sergio Massidda | 6 September 2023 | World Championships | Riyadh, Saudi Arabia | |
67 kg
| Snatch | 148 kg | Mirko Zanni | 5 April 2021 | European Championships | Moscow, Russia | |
| Clean & Jerk | 177 kg | Mirko Zanni | 25 July 2021 | Olympic Games | Tokyo, Japan | |
| Total | 322 kg | Mirko Zanni | 25 July 2021 | Olympic Games | Tokyo, Japan | |
73 kg
| Snatch | 155 kg | Mirko Zanni | 18 April 2023 | European Championships | Yerevan, Armenia | |
| Clean & Jerk | 180 kg | Mirko Zanni | 18 April 2023 | European Championships | Yerevan, Armenia | |
| Total | 335 kg | Mirko Zanni | 18 April 2023 | European Championships | Yerevan, Armenia | |
81 kg
| Snatch | 165 kg | Antonino Pizzolato | 31 July 2021 | Olympic Games | Tokyo, Japan | |
| Clean & Jerk | 206 kg | Antonino Pizzolato | 7 April 2021 | European Championships | Moscow, Russia | |
| Total | 370 kg | Antonino Pizzolato | 7 April 2021 | European Championships | Moscow, Russia | |
89 kg
| Snatch | 175 kg | Antonino Pizzolato | 2 June 2022 | European Championships | Tirana, Albania | |
| Clean & Jerk | 217 kg | Antonino Pizzolato | 2 June 2022 | European Championships | Tirana, Albania | |
| Total | 392 kg | Antonino Pizzolato | 2 June 2022 | European Championships | Tirana, Albania | |
96 kg
| Snatch | 165 kg | Cristiano Ficco | 21 April 2023 | European Championships | Yerevan, Armenia | |
| Clean & Jerk | 198 kg | Cristiano Ficco | 21 April 2023 | European Championships | Yerevan, Armenia | |
| Total | 363 kg | Cristiano Ficco | 21 April 2023 | European Championships | Yerevan, Armenia | |
102 kg
| Snatch | 164 kg | Cristiano Ficco | 4 July 2022 | Mediterranean Games | Oran, Algeria | |
| Clean & Jerk | 207 kg | Cristiano Ficco | 4 July 2022 | Mediterranean Games | Oran, Algeria | |
| Total | 371 kg | Cristiano Ficco | 4 July 2022 | Mediterranean Games | Oran, Algeria | |
109 kg
| Snatch | | | | | | |
| Clean & Jerk | | | | | | |
| Total | 353 kg | Standard | | | | |
+109 kg
| Snatch | | | | | | |
| Clean & Jerk | | | | | | |
| Total | 362 kg | Standard | | | | |

=== Men (1998–2018) ===
| Event | Record | Athlete | Date | Meet | Place | Ref |
–56 kg
| Snatch | 120 kg | Mirco Scarantino | 7 March 2015 | Italian Championships | Ostia, Italy | |
| Clean & Jerk | 150 kg | Mirco Scarantino | 7 March 2015 | Italian Championships | Ostia, Italy | |
| Total | 270 kg | Mirco Scarantino | 7 March 2015 | Italian Championships | Ostia, Italy | |
–62 kg
| Snatch | 127 kg | Giuliano Cornetta | 24 April 2004 | European Championships | Kyiv, Ukraine | |
| Clean & Jerk | 152 kg | Michael Di Giusto | 8 November 2014 | World Championships | Almaty, Kazakhstan | |
| Total | 272 kg | Michael Di Giusto | 8 November 2014 | World Championships | Almaty, Kazakhstan | |
–69 kg
| Snatch | 145 kg | Mirko Zanni | 24 June 2018 | Mediterranean Games | Tarragona, Spain | |
| Clean & Jerk | 180 kg | Giuseppe Ficco | 24 November 1999 | World Championships | Athens, Greece | |
| Total | 320 kg | Giuseppe Ficco | 24 November 1999 | World Championships | Athens, Greece | |
–77 kg
| Snatch | 156 kg | Giorgio De Luca | 8 April 2010 | European Championships | Minsk, Belarus | |
| Clean & Jerk | 179 kg | Giorgio De Luca | 13 March 2010 | Italian Championships | Rome, Italy | |
| Total | 326 kg | Giorgio De Luca | 24 November 2009 | World Championships | Goyang, South Korea | |
–85 kg
| Snatch | 162 kg | Antonino Pizzolato | 3 December 2017 | World Championships | Anaheim, United States | |
| Clean & Jerk | 202 kg | Antonino Pizzolato | 24 November 2015 | World Championships | Houston, United States | |
| Total | 363 kg | Antonino Pizzolato | 24 November 2015 | World Championships | Houston, United States | |
–94 kg
| Snatch | 162 kg* | Raffaele Mancino | 13 April 1996 | European Championships | Stavanger, Norway | |
| Clean & Jerk | 201 kg | Antonino Pizzolato | 9 December 2017 | Italian Championships | Lecce, Italy | |
| Total | 360 kg | Antonino Pizzolato | 20 February 2016 | Italian Championships | Ostia, Italy | |
–105 kg
| Snatch | 180 kg | Moreno Boer | 14 April 1999 | European Championships | A Coruña, Spain | |
| Clean & Jerk | 220 kg | Moreno Boer | 25 April 2002 | European Championships | Antalya, Turkey | |
| Total | 400 kg | Moreno Boer | 25 April 2002 | European Championships | Antalya, Turkey | |
+105 kg
| Snatch | 180 kg | Moreno Boer | 11 December 1999 | Italian Championships | Teramo, Italy | |
| Clean & Jerk | 217 kg | Moreno Boer | 18 April 2003 | European Championships | Loutraki, Greece | |
| Total | 392 kg | Moreno Boer | 18 April 2003 | European Championships | Loutraki, Greece | |

=== Women (2018–2025) ===
| Event | Record | Athlete | Date | Meet | Place | Ref |
45 kg
| Snatch | 66 kg | Alessandra Pagliaro | 19 October 2019 | European U23 Championships | Bucharest, Romania | |
| Clean & Jerk | 85 kg | Alessandra Pagliaro | 19 October 2019 | European U23 Championships | Bucharest, Romania | |
| Total | 151 kg | Alessandra Pagliaro | 19 October 2019 | European U23 Championships | Bucharest, Romania | |
49 kg
| Snatch | 85 kg | Giulia Imperio | 23 May 2021 | World Junior Championships | Tashkent, Uzbekistan | |
| Clean & Jerk | 103 kg | Giorgia Russo | 6 April 2019 | European Championships | Batumi, Georgia | |
| Total | 185 kg | Giulia Imperio | 5 December 2023 | IWF Grand Prix | Doha, Qatar | |
55 kg
| Snatch | 90 kg | Lucrezia Magistris | 7 April 2019 | European Championships | Batumi, Georgia | |
| Snatch | 91 kg | Celine Ludovica Delia | 1 May 2025 | World Junior Championships | Lima, Peru | |
| Clean & Jerk | 111 kg | Celine Ludovica Delia | 24 June 2023 | Italian Championships | Rome, Italy | |
| Clean & Jerk | 114 kg | Celine Ludovica Delia | 1 May 2025 | World Junior Championships | Lima, Peru | |
| Total | 200 kg | Lucrezia Magistris | 14 December 2019 | Italian Championships | Ostia, Italy | |
| Total | 205 kg | Celine Ludovica Delia | 1 May 2025 | World Junior Championships | Lima, Peru | |
59 kg
| Snatch | 102 kg | Lucrezia Magistris | 8 December 2023 | IWF Grand Prix | Doha, Qatar | |
| Clean & Jerk | 115 kg | Lucrezia Magistris | 8 December 2023 | IWF Grand Prix | Doha, Qatar | |
| Total | 217 kg | Lucrezia Magistris | 8 December 2023 | IWF Grand Prix | Doha, Qatar | |
64 kg
| Snatch | 104 kg | Giorgia Bordignon | 27 July 2021 | Olympic Games | Tokyo, Japan | |
| Clean & Jerk | 128 kg | Giorgia Bordignon | 27 July 2021 | Olympic Games | Tokyo, Japan | |
| Total | 232 kg | Giorgia Bordignon | 27 July 2021 | Olympic Games | Tokyo, Japan | |
71 kg
| Snatch | 110 kg | Giulia Miserendino | 12 December 2022 | World Championships | Bogotá, Colombia | |
| Clean & Jerk | 125 kg | Alessia Durante | 12 June 2021 | Pre-Olympic Tournament | Rome, Italy | |
| Total | 233 kg | Giulia Miserendino | 12 December 2022 | World Championships | Bogotá, Colombia | |
76 kg
| Snatch | 101 kg | Genna Toko Kegne | 17 February 2024 | European Championships | Sofia, Bulgaria | |
| Clean & Jerk | 126 kg | Genna Toko Kegne | 17 February 2024 | European Championships | Sofia, Bulgaria | |
| Clean & Jerk | 133 kg | Genna Toko Kegne | 18 April 2025 | European Championships | Chișinău, Moldova | |
| Total | 227 kg | Genna Toko Kegne | 17 February 2024 | European Championships | Sofia, Bulgaria | |
| Total | 233 kg | Genna Toko Kegne | 18 April 2025 | European Championships | Chișinău, Moldova | |
81 kg
| Snatch | 98 kg | Carlotta Brunelli | 25 June 2023 | Italian Championships | Rome, Italy | |
| Clean & Jerk | 125 kg | Francesca Ponti | 25 June 2023 | Italian Championships | Rome, Italy | |
| Total | 217 kg | Francesca Ponti | 25 June 2023 | Italian Championships | Rome, Italy | |
87 kg
| Snatch | | | | | | |
| Clean & Jerk | | | | | | |
| Total | 224 kg | Standard | | | | |
+87 kg
| Snatch | | | | | | |
| Clean & Jerk | | | | | | |
| Total | 233 kg | Standard | | | | |

=== Women (1998–2018) ===
| Event | Record | Athlete | Date | Meet | Place | Ref |
–48 kg
| Snatch | 88 kg | Genny Pagliaro | 14 April 2008 | European Championships | Lignano Sabbiadoro, Italy | |
| Clean & Jerk | 106 kg | Genny Pagliaro | 14 April 2008 | European Championships | Lignano Sabbiadoro, Italy | |
| Total | 194 kg | Genny Pagliaro | 14 April 2008 | European Championships | Lignano Sabbiadoro, Italy | |
–53 kg
| Snatch | 86 kg | Genny Pagliaro | 9 March 2008 | Italian Junior Championships | Rome, Italy | |
| Clean & Jerk | 108 kg | Jennifer Lombardo | 24 June 2018 | Mediterranean Games | Tarragona, Spain | |
| Total | 193 kg | Jennifer Lombardo | 24 June 2018 | Mediterranean Games | Tarragona, Spain | |
–58 kg
| Snatch | 90 kg | Silvia Puxeddu | 17 November 2003 | World Championships | Vancouver, Canada | |
| Clean & Jerk | 112 kg | Jennifer Lombardo | 7 April 2014 | European Championships | Tel Aviv, Israel | |
| Total | 200 kg | Silvia Puxeddu | 17 November 2003 | World Championships | Vancouver, Canada | |
–63 kg
| Snatch | 100 kg | Giorgia Bordignon | 8 March 2015 | Italian Championships | Ostia, Italy | |
| Clean & Jerk | 120 kg | Giorgia Bordignon | 25 November 2015 | World Championships | Houston, United States | |
| Total | 219 kg | Giorgia Bordignon | 13 April 2016 | European Championships | Førde, Norway | |
–69 kg
| Snatch | 105 kg | Giorgia Bordignon | 25 February 2018 | Italian Championships | Rome, Italia | |
| Clean & Jerk | 127 kg | Giorgia Bordignon | 25 February 2018 | Italian Championships | Rome, Italia | |
| Total | 232 kg | Giorgia Bordignon | 25 February 2018 | Italian Championships | Rome, Italy | |
–75 kg
| Snatch | 97 kg | Carlotta Brunelli | 9 December 2016 | European U23 Championships | Eilat, Israel | |
| Clean & Jerk | 117 kg | Carlotta Brunelli | 17 November 2017 | Italian Championships qualification | Verona, Italy | |
| Total | 213 kg | Carlotta Brunelli | 6 April 2017 | European Championships | Split, Croatia | |
–90 kg
| Snatch | | | | | | |
| Clean & Jerk | | | | | | |
| Total | | | | | | |
+90 kg
| Snatch | 101 kg | Annarosa Campaldini | 12 November 2011 | World Championships | Paris, France | |
| Clean & Jerk | 124 kg | Annarosa Campaldini | 12 November 2011 | World Championships | Paris, France | |
| Total | 225 kg | Annarosa Campaldini | 12 November 2011 | World Championships | Paris, France | |
