= Alıcı =

Alıcı is a Turkish surname. Notable people with the surname include:

- Burcu Alıcı (born 2001), Turkish weightlifter
- Duygu Alıcı (born 2001), Turkish weightlifter
- Ecem Alıcı (born 1994), Turkish volleyball player
