= Koz =

Koz or KOZ may refer to:

== People ==
- Cüneyt Köz, Turkish footballer
- Dave Koz, American jazz saxophonist, keyboardist, and composer
- Rich Koz, American actor and broadcaster
- Tuğbanur Koz (born 2007), Turkish female weightlifter
- Koz (musician), Canadian musician

== Other ==
- A kilo-ounce
- KOZ SR, Confederation of Trade Unions of the Slovak Republic (Konfederácia odborových zväzov Slovenskej republiky)
- KOZ, Keystone Opportunity Zone, areas in Pennsylvania with reduced tax
- Kosciuszko Park in Chicago, IL, Land of Koz
