= Davit Hovhannisyan =

Armenian weightlifter

Medal record
Representing Armenia
Men's weightlifting
European Championships
Gold medal – first place	2022 Tirana	-96 kg
Gold medal – first place	2023 Yerevan	-96 kg
Silver medal – second place	2024 Sofia	-96 kg
Bronze medal – third place	2025 Chișinău	-96 kg
Bronze medal – third place	2019 Batumi	-89 kg

Davit Hovhannisyan (born 14 January 1997), is an Armenian weightlifter, two-time European Champion (2022, 2023), silver medalist at the 2024 European Weightlifting Championships, bronze medalist at the 2019 European Weightlifting Championships, and 2016 European Junior Champion.

== Career ==
Davit Hovhannisyan began competing at the international youth level in 2014. The Armenian athlete won the 2016 European Junior Championships in the 77 kg weight category, achieving a total result of 327 kg.

At the 2019 European Weightlifting Championships held in Batumi, Georgia, he won the bronze medal with a total result of 360 kg. He also earned a small bronze medal in the snatch exercise (165 kg).

At the 2022 European Weightlifting Championships held in Tirana, Albania, Davit became the continental champion in the 96 kg weight category with a total of 377 kg (snatch: 171 kg, clean and jerk: 206 kg).

At the 2023 European Weightlifting Championships held in Yerevan, Davit repeated his success from the previous year, winning the gold medal with a total of 377 kg (snatch: 172 kg, clean and jerk: 205 kg).

On February 18, 2024, at the 2024 European Weightlifting Championships in Sofia, Davit Hovhannisyan became the silver medalist in the 96 kg category, losing by only 1 kg (169 + 205 = 374) to fellow Armenian weightlifter Hakob Mkrtchyan.

In April 2025, at the European Championships held in Chișinău, he won the bronze medal in the 96 kg weight category with a total result of 376 kg.

== Major results ==
Year	Tournament	Location	Result	Weight class	Snatch	Clean & Jerk	Total
2019	European Championships	Batumi, Georgia	3rd	89 kg	165 kg	195 kg	360 kg
2022	European Championships	Tirana, Albania	1st	96 kg	171 kg	206 kg	377 kg
2023	European Championships	Yerevan, Armenia	1st	96 kg	172 kg	205 kg	377 kg
2024	European Championships	Sofia, Bulgaria	2nd	96 kg	169 kg	205 kg	374 kg
2025	European Championships	Chișinău, Moldova	3rd	96 kg	170 kg	206 kg	376 kg
