= Burcu Alıcı =

Turkish weightlifter (born 2001)

Personal information
- Born: 14 January 2001 (age 25) Gaziantep, Turkey
- Weight: 55 kg (121 lb)

Sport
- Country: Turkey
- Weight class: 55 kg
Medal record
Women's weightlifting
Representing Turkey
European Championships
Bronze medal – third place	2024 Sofia	55 kg S
Bronze medal – third place	2024 Sofia	55 kg CJ

Duygu Alıcı (born 14 January 2001) is a Turkish weightlifter competing in the 55 kg division.

== Sports career ==
Alıcı started performing weightlifting at the age of twelve in the middle school with the encouragement of her art teacher.

She won several competitions in her country, such as the first place in Interscholastic championship, first places in U15 and U17 divisions, and broke the youth record in the Clean & Jerk event with 55 kg. She became champion in Bosnia and Herzegovina. In 2022, she competed in the 55 kg division at the Turkish Senior Weightlifting Championships, and lifted 80 kg in the Snatch and 105 kg in the Clean & Jerk event.

Alıcı won two bronze medals, in the 55 kg Snatch event with 85 kg and in the Clean & Jerk event with 105 kg at the 2024 European Weightlifting Championships held in Sofia, Bulgaria. She renewed her own record in 55 kg Snatch with 85 kg.

== Personal career ==
Duygu Alıcı was born in Gaziantep, Turkey on 14 January 2001. She has a twin sister Duygu, and a two-year younger sister Züleyha, who also perdorm weightlifting.

Alıcı is a student of Sport management in the School of Physical Education and Sport at Istanbul Gelişim University.
