= Duygu Alıcı =

Turkish weightlifter (born 2001)

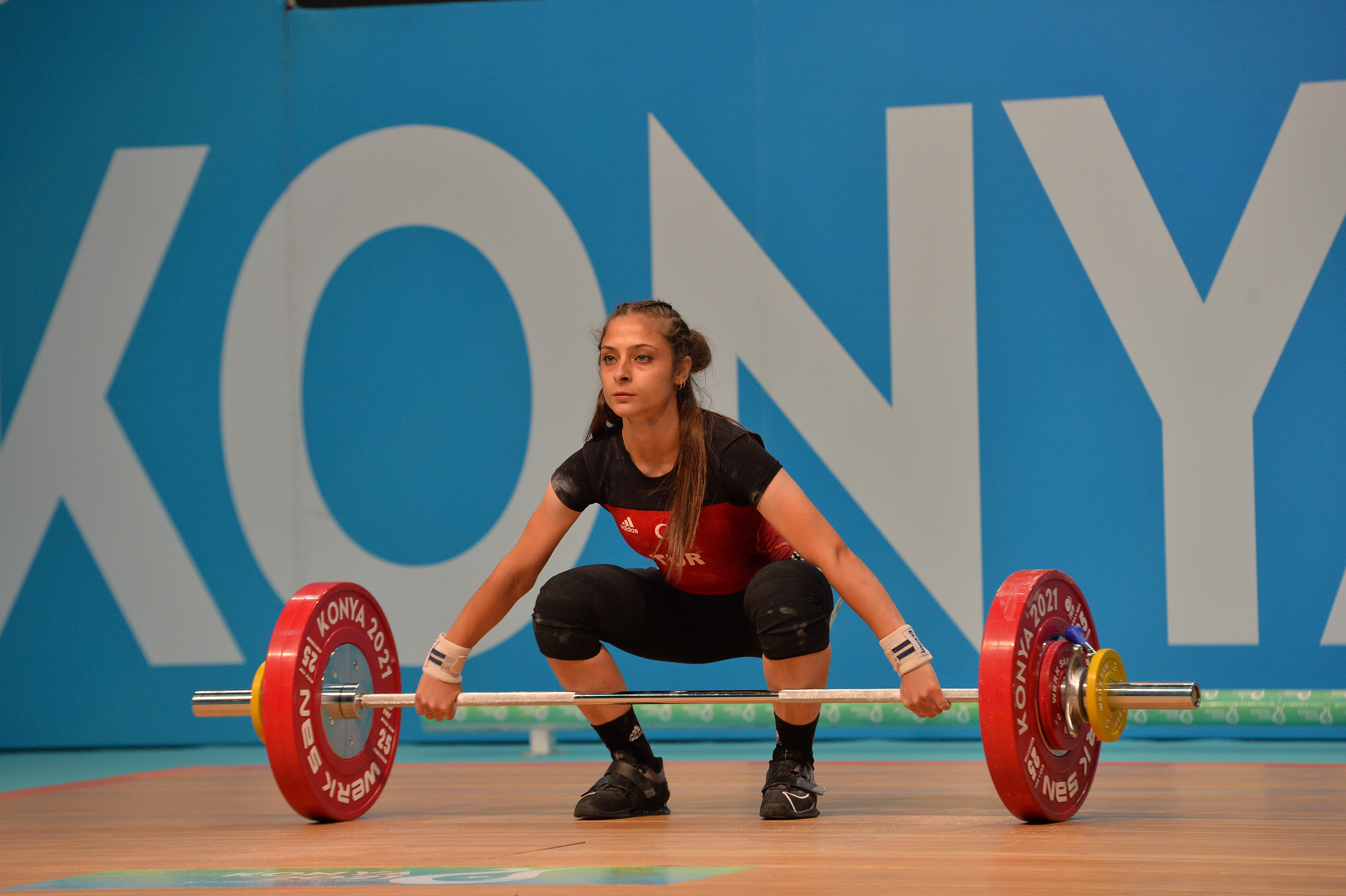
- Alıcı at the 2021 Islamic Solidarity Games

Personal information
- Born: 14 January 2001 (age 25) Gaziantep, Turkey
- Weight: 49 kg (108 lb)

Sport
- Country: Turkey
- Weight class: 49 kg
Medal record
Women's weightlifting
Representing Turkey
European Championships
Silver medal – second place	2024 Sofia	49 kg S
Islamic Solidarity Games
Gold medal – first place	2021 Konya	49 kg
European U23 Championships
Silver medal – second place	2022 Durrës	49 kg
Bronze medal – third place	2023 Bucharest	49 kg

Duygu Alıcı (born 14 January 2001) is a Turkish weightlifter competing in the 49 kg division.

== Sports career ==
Alıcı started performing weightlifting at the age of twelve in the middle school with the encouragement of her art teacher.

She won several competitions in her country, such as the first place in Interscholastic championship, first places in U15 and U17 divisions, and broke the youth record in the Clean & Jerk event with 55 kg. She became champion in Bosnia and Herzegovina. In 2022, she competed in the 55 kg division at the Turkish Senior Weightlifting Championships, and lifted 80 kg in the Snatch and 105 kg in the Clean & Jerk event.

Alıcı won the silver medal in the 49 kg Snatch event with 78 kg at the 2024 European Weightlifting Championships held in Sofia, Bulgaria.

== Personal career ==
Duygu Alıcı was born in Gaziantep, Turkey on 14 January 2001. She has a twin sister Burcu, and a two-year younger sister Züleyha, who also perform weightlifting.

Alıcı is a student of Sport management in the School of Physical Education and Sport at Istanbul Gelişim University.
