= Libya at the 2026 Mediterranean Games =

- IOC code: LBA
- NOC: Libyan Olympic Committee

in Taranto, Italy
- Competitors: 9 in 7 sports
- Medals Ranked 22nd: Gold 0 Silver 3 Bronze 0 Total 3

Mediterranean Games appearances
- 1951; 1955; 1959; 1963; 1967; 1971; 1975; 1979; 1983; 1987; 1991; 1993; 1997; 2001; 2005; 2009; 2013; 2018; 2022; 2026

Libya competed at the 2026 Mediterranean Games in Taranto, Italy from 21 August to 3 September 2026.

== Competitors ==
The following is the list of number of competitors participating at the Games per sport/discipline.

Sport	Men	Women	Total
Archery	0	1	1
Athletics	1	0	1
Boules	2	0	2
Fencing	1	0	1
Karate	2	0	2
Rowing	1	0	1
Weightlifting	1	0	1
Total	8	1	9

== Medal table ==
Medal	Name	Sport	Event	Date
Silver	Mohammed Alzintani	Weightlifting	Men's 85 kg – Snatch	1 September
Silver	Mohammed Alzintani	Weightlifting	Men's 85 kg – Clean and jerk	1 September
Silver	Mohamed Abudabous	Karate	Men's 84 kg	2 September

Medals by date
Day	Date	1st place, gold medalist(s)	2nd place, silver medalist(s)	3rd place, bronze medalist(s)	Total
12	1 September	0	2	0	2
13	2 September	0	1	0	1
Total		0	3	0	3

Medals by sport
Sport	1st place, gold medalist(s)	2nd place, silver medalist(s)	3rd place, bronze medalist(s)	Total
Karate	0	1	0	1
Weightlifting	0	2	0	2
Total	0	3	0	3

Medals by gender
Gender	1st place, gold medalist(s)	2nd place, silver medalist(s)	3rd place, bronze medalist(s)	Total
Male	0	3	0	3
Female	0	0	0	0
Total	0	3	0	3

== Archery ==
Athlete	Event	Ranking round		Round of 32	Round of 16	Quarterfinals	Semifinals	Final / BM	
Athlete	Event	Score	Seed	Opposition Score	Opposition Score	Opposition Score	Opposition Score	Opposition Score	Rank
Aman Elfghi	Women's individual	564	19 Q	Randriantsara (FRA); L 4–6	Did not advance				

== Athletics ==
=== Track and road events ===
Athlete	Event	Heat		Final	
Athlete	Event	Result	Rank	Result	Rank
Ahmed Essabai	Men's 800 m	DNF		Did not advance	

== Boules ==
Athlete	Event	Group Play			Semifinals	Final / BM	
Athlete	Event	Opposition Score	Opposition Score	Rank	Opposition Score	Opposition Score	Rank
Abdulmuhaymin Zanto	Men's raffa singles	Nanni (ITA); L 5–6	Frisoni (SMR); L 4–7	4	Did not advance		
Rashed Alswesi; Abdulmuhaymin Zanto	Men's raffa doubles	Hamel; Zekiri (ALG); W 8–6	Sofronievski; Svara (SLO); L 8–11	1 Q	Dall'Olmo; Frisoni (SMR); L 3–10	Nanni; Viscusi (ITA); L 6–7	4

== Fencing ==
Athlete	Event	Group Stage						Round of 32	Round of 16	Quarterfinals	Semifinals	Final / BM	
Athlete	Event	Opposition Score	Opposition Score	Opposition Score	Opposition Score	Opposition Score	Rank	Opposition Score	Opposition Score	Opposition Score	Opposition Score	Opposition Score	Rank
Ali Talib	Men's épee	Piatti (ITA); L 0–5	Theodoropoulo (GRE); L 1–5	El-Sayed (EGY); L 0–5	Markota (CRO); L 1–5	Bundaleski (MKD); L 3–5	6	Did not advance					

== Karate ==
Athlete	Event	Round of 16	Quarterfinals	Semifinals	Repechage	Final / BM	Rank
Athlete	Event	Opposition Result	Opposition Result	Opposition Result	Opposition Result	Opposition Result	Rank
Mohamed Abudabous	Men's 84 kg	Vasiliou (CYP); W 3–1	Mastrogiannis (GRE); W 1–1	Ba (EGY); W 4–4	—N/a	Sriti (MAR); L 1–5	2nd place, silver medalist(s)
Nuri Abdulsalam	Men's +84 kg	Bye	Pakashtica (ALB); L 2–5	Did not advance			

== Rowing ==
Athlete	Event	Heats		Final	
Athlete	Event	Time	Rank	Time	Rank
Mohamed Bukrah	Men's single sculls	7:53.45	5 FB	1:54.03	5 FB5
Mohamed Bukrah	Men's lightweight single sculls	DNS		Did not advance	

== Weightlifting ==
Athlete	Event	Snatch					Clean & Jerk					Total
Athlete	Event	1	2	3	Result	Rank	1	2	3	Result	Rank	Total
Mohammed Alzintani	Men's 85 kg	157	161	167	167	2nd place, silver medalist(s)	193	201	—N/a	201	2nd place, silver medalist(s)	368
