= Jennifer Lombardo =

Italian weightlifter (born 1991)

Personal information
- Nationality: Italian
- Born: 24 June 1991 (age 35) Palermo, Italy
- Weight: 54 kg (119 lb)

Sport
- Country: Italy
- Sport: Weightlifting
- Event: Women's 53 kg
- Club: G.S. Fiamme Azzurre
Medal record
European Championships
Silver medal – second place	2018 Bucharest	−53 kg
Silver medal – second place	2018 Bucharest	Snatch −53 kg
Silver medal – second place	2018 Bucharest	C&J −53 kg
Mediterranean Games
Gold medal – first place	2018 Tarragona	Snatch −53 kg
Gold medal – first place	2018 Tarragona	C&J −53 kg

Jennifer Lombardo (born 24 June 1991) is an Italian weightlifter who won two gold medals at the 2018 Mediterranean Games.

== See also ==
- Italian records in Olympic weightlifting
- Italy at the 2018 Mediterranean Games
