= Gabriel Marinov =

Bulgarian weightlifter

Personal information
- Native name: Габриел Маринов
- Full name: Gabriel Marinov
- Nationality: Bulgarian
- Born: 25 December 2003 (age 22)

Sport
- Country: Bulgaria
- Sport: Weightlifting
- Weight class: 61 kg
Medal record
Representing Bulgaria
European Championships
Bronze medal – third place	2022 Tirana	61 kg
Gold medal – first place	2024 Sofia	61 kg
European U23 Championships
Bronze medal – third place	2025 Durres	65 kg

Gabriel Marinov (Bulgarian:Габриел Маринов; born 25 December 2003) is a Bulgarian weightlifter. He won the gold medal in the men's 61 kg event at the 2024 European Weightlifting Championships held in Sofia, Bulgaria.

== Major results ==
Year	Venue	Weight	Snatch (kg)				Clean & Jerk (kg)				Total	Rank
Year	Venue	Weight	1	2	3	Rank	1	2	3	Rank	Total	Rank
World Championships
2025	Førde, Norway	65 kg	120	~~125~~	125	14	150	~~155~~	~~160~~	14	275	13
European Championships
2022	Tirana, Albania	61 kg	116	119	122	6	151	~~157~~	157	1st place, gold medalist(s)	279	3rd place, bronze medalist(s)
2024	Sofia, Bulgaria	61 kg	118	~~121~~	121	5	152	160	-	1st place, gold medalist(s)	281	1st place, gold medalist(s)

2025 Balkan Weightlifting Championships
