= Weronika Zielińska-Stubińska =

Polish weightlifter (born 1997)

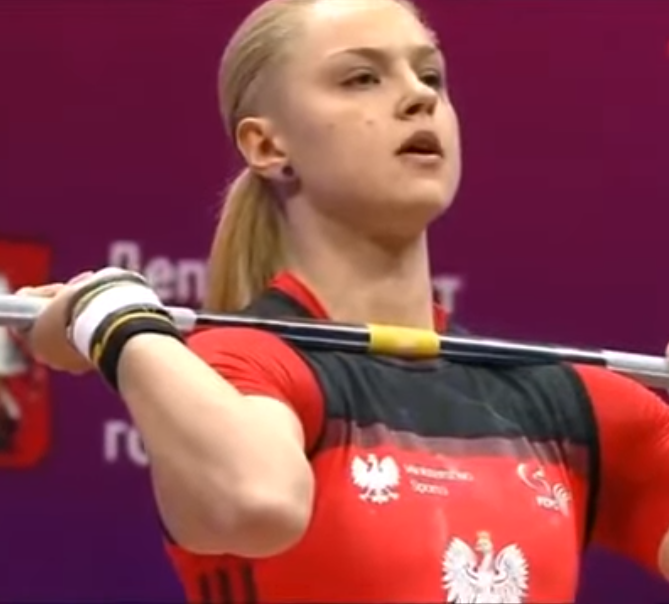
- At the 2021 European Weightlifting Championships

Personal information
- Born: 16 May 1997 (age 29) Biała Podlaska, Poland
- Education: Józef Piłsudski University of Physical Education

Sport
- Country: Poland
- Sport: Weightlifting
- Weight class: 81 kg
- Club: AZS AWF Biała Podlaska
- Coached by: Paulina Szyszko
Medal record
Women's weightlifting
Representing Poland
European Championships
| Gold medal – first place | 2024 Sofia | 81 kg |
| Bronze medal – third place | 2025 Chișinău | 81 kg |

Weronika Zielińska-Stubińska (born 16 May 1997) is a Polish athlete who competes in weightlifting.

== Career ==
She won a gold medal at the 2024 European Weightlifting Championships, in the 81 kg category.

She also competed at the 2022 European Weightlifting Championships held in Tirana, Albania and the 2023 European Weightlifting Championships held in Yerevan, Armenia.

In 2024, she competed in the women's 81 kg event at the Summer Olympics held in Paris, France. She failed to register a successful attempt in the Snatch and finished the competition.

== Major results ==
| Year | Venue | Weight | Snatch (kg) | | | | Clean & Jerk (kg) | | | | Total | Rank |
| Year | Venue | Weight | 1 | 2 | 3 | Rank | 1 | 2 | 3 | Rank | Total | Rank |
Summer Olympics
| 2024 | Paris, France | 81 kg | ~~106~~ | ~~107~~ | ~~107~~ | —N/a | — | — | — | —N/a | DNF | — |
World Championships
| 2023 | Riyadh, Saudi Arabia | 81 kg | 103 | ~~106~~ | 107 | 8 | 130 | ~~134~~ | ~~134~~ | 6 | 237 | 6 |
IWF World Cup
| 2024 | Phuket, Thailand | 81 kg | ~~107~~ | 107 | 110 | 11 | 131 | ~~135~~ | ~~136~~ | 14 | 241 | 10 |
European Championships
| 2021 | Moscow, Russia | 81 kg | 95 | ~~99~~ | ~~99~~ | 8 | ~~118~~ | ~~118~~ | 121 | 5 | 216 | 7 |
| 2022 | Tirana, Albania | 81 kg | ~~98~~ | 98 | ~~102~~ | 5 | 121 | ~~127~~ | 127 | 4 | 225 | 4 |
| 2023 | Yerevan, Armenia | 81 kg | 93 | 96 | 98 | 5 | 117 | ~~120~~ | 121 | 6 | 219 | 7 |
| 2024 | Sofia, Bulgaria | 81 kg | ~~103~~ | 103 | ~~106~~ | 1st place, gold medalist(s) | 127 | ~~130~~ | 132 | 1st place, gold medalist(s) | 235 | 1st place, gold medalist(s) |
| 2025 | Chișinău, Moldova | 81 kg | 102 | 105 | ~~107~~ | 2nd place, silver medalist(s) | 128 | 132 | ~~136~~ | 3rd place, bronze medalist(s) | 237 | 3rd place, bronze medalist(s) |
