= Hanna Davydova =

Ukrainian weightlifter (born 1998)

Personal information
- Native name: Ганна Давидова
- Born: 25 June 1998 (age 28) Vinnytsia, Ukraine

Sport
- Country: Ukraine
- Sport: Weightlifting
- Weight class: 64 kg
Medal record
Women's weightlifting
Representing Ukraine
European Championships
| Gold medal – first place | 2024 Sofia | 64 kg |

Hanna Davydova (Ukrainian: Ганна Давидова, born 25 June 1998 in Vinnytsia) is a Ukrainian weightlifter. She's 2024 European champion in Sofia in 64 kg event.

== Career ==
She debuted competing in international competitions at the 2023 European Weightlifting Championships, held in Yerevan, in 64 kg event, but she didn't reach a medal (7th place).

Then she competed at the 2023 World Weightlifting Championships in Riyadh in 64 kg event without winning a medal in total event (6th place).

Her first major achievement in international competitions is a gold medal at the 2024 European Weightlifting Championships in 64 kg event.

== Achievements ==
| Year | Venue | Weight | Snatch (kg) | | | | Clean & Jerk (kg) | | | | Total | Rank |
| Year | Venue | Weight | 1 | 2 | 3 | Rank | 1 | 2 | 3 | Rank | Total | Rank |
European Championships
| 2023 | Yerevan, Armenia | 64 kg | ~~93~~ | 93 | ~~96~~ | 6 | ~~110~~ | 110 | ~~115~~ | 11 | 203 | 7 |
| 2024 | Sofia, Bulgaria | 64 kg | ~~98~~ | 98 | 100 | 2nd place, silver medalist(s) | 117 | 120 | ~~122~~ | 2nd place, silver medalist(s) | 220 | 1st place, gold medalist(s) |
