= Tuğbanur Koz =

Turkish weightlifter (born 2007)

Personal information
- Born: 7 February 2007 (age 19) Gaziantep, Turkey
- Education: Sports science (Gaziamtep University)
- Weight: 71 kg (157 lb)

Sport
- Country: Turkey
- Sport: Weightlifting
- Weight class: 77 kg
Medal record
Women's Weightlifting
Representing Turkey
Mediterranean Games
| Bronze medal – third place | 2026 Taranto | 77 kg S |
| Bronze medal – third place | 2026 Taranto | 77 kg C&J |
World Junior Championships
| Bronze medal – third place | 2026 Ismailia | – 69 kg S EJR |
Youth World Championships
| Bronze medal – third place | 2024 Lima | 64 kg S |
| Bronze medal – third place | 2024 Lima | 64 kg Total |
European Junior and U23 Championships
| Silver medal – second place | 2024 Raszyn | 64 kg S |

Tuğbanur Koz (born 7 February 2007), also known as Tuğba Nur Koz, is a Turkish weightlifter, who competes in the 77 kg division. She represents Turkey at international competitions.

== Sport career ==
Koz captured gold medals in the Snatch with 73 kg, in the Clean&Jerk with 88 kg and in Total with 161 kg of the U15 59 kg event at the 2022 European Youth Championships in Raszyn, Poland.

She took a bronze medal in the 64 kg Snatch event with 88 kg and another one in the Total with 193 kg at the 2024 Youth World Championships in Lima, Peru.+. That same year, she won the silver medal in the 64 kg Snarch event with 88 kg at the 2024 European Junior and U23 Championships in Raszyn, Poland.

At the 2026 World Junior Championships in Ismailia, Egypt, she received the bronze medal in the – 69 kg Snatch event, and set a new European junior record with 105 kg. She competed in the 77 kg division at the 2026 Mediterranean Games in Taranto, Italy. She won bronze medals in the snatch event with 104 kg and in the Clean&Jerk event with 117 kg.

== Personal life ==
Born on 7 February 2007, Tuğbanur Koz is a native of Gaziantep, southeastern Turkey.

Koz is a student in the Faculty of Sportss science at Gaziantep University.
