= Weightlifting at the 2026 Mediterranean Games =

Weightlifting competition

- Venue: San Giorgio Ionico Sports Hall
- Dates: 31 August – 2 September
- Competitors: 68 from 17 nations

The weightlifting event at the 2026 Mediterranean Games was held in San Giorgio Ionico, Italy, from 31 August to 2 September.

== Medal table ==
* Host nation (Italy)

| Rank | Nation | Gold | Silver | Bronze | Total |
|---|---|---|---|---|---|
| 1 | Egypt | 7 | 2 | 1 | 10 |
| 2 | Italy* | 4 | 2 | 5 | 11 |
| 3 | Turkey | 2 | 3 | 5 | 10 |
| 4 | Spain | 2 | 2 | 1 | 5 |
| 5 | Algeria | 2 | 0 | 1 | 3 |
| 6 | Albania | 1 | 0 | 2 | 3 |
| 7 | Greece | 0 | 3 | 0 | 3 |
| 8 | Tunisia | 0 | 2 | 2 | 4 |
| 9 | Kosovo | 0 | 2 | 0 | 2 |
| 9 | Libya | 0 | 2 | 0 | 2 |
| 11 | Syria | 0 | 0 | 1 | 1 |
| Totals (11 entries) | | 18 | 18 | 18 | 54 |

== Medal summary ==
=== Men's events ===
| Event | | Gold | | Silver | | Bronze | |
| – 65 kg | Snatch | Noureldin Zaky (EGY) | 133 kg | Ferdi Hardal (TUR) | 132 kg | Sergio Massidda (ITA) | 130 kg |
| – 65 kg | Clean & Jerk | Sergio Massidda (ITA) | 162 kg | Noureldin Zaky (EGY) | 161 kg | Ferdi Hardal (TUR) | 156 kg |
| – 75 kg | Snatch | Briken Calja (ALB) | 154 kg | Yusuf Fehmi Genç (TUR) | 153 kg | Karem Ben Hnia (TUN) | 151 kg |
| – 75 kg | Clean & Jerk | Yusuf Fehmi Genç (TUR) | 187 kg | Karem Ben Hnia (TUN) | 186 kg | Briken Calja (ALB) | 184 kg |
| – 85 kg | Snatch | Abdelrahman Younes (EGY) | 172 kg | Mohammed Al-Zintani (LBA) | 167 kg | Cristiano Ficco (ITA) | 155 kg |
| – 85 kg | Clean & Jerk | Abdelrahman Younes (EGY) | 205 kg | Mohammed Al-Zintani (LBA) | 201 kg | Cristiano Ficco (ITA) | 190 kg |
| – 95 kg | Snatch | Faris Touairi (ALG) | 169 kg | Kianoush Rostami (KOS) | 166 kg | Karim Abokahla (EGY) | 164 kg |
| – 95 kg | Clean & Jerk | Karim Abokahla (EGY) | 204 kg | Kianoush Rostami (KOS) | 203 kg | Faris Touairi (ALG) | 195 kg |
| – 110 kg | Snatch | Marcos Ruiz (ESP) | 185 kg | Aymen Bacha (TUN) | 176 kg | Simone Abati (ITA) | 175 kg |
| – 110 kg | Clean & Jerk | Aymen Touairi (ALG) | 209 kg | Marcos Ruiz (ESP) | 208 kg | Hamza Alasad Hallak (SYR) | 191 kg |

=== Women's events ===
| Event | | Gold | | Silver | | Bronze | |
| – 53 kg | Snatch | Cansel Özkan (TUR) | 91 kg | Maria Stratoudaki (GRE) | 83 kg | Celine Ludovica Delia (ITA) | 81 kg |
| – 53 kg | Clean & Jerk | Alba Sánchez (ESP) | 105 kg | Maria Stratoudaki (GRE) | 104 kg | Cansel Özkan (TUR) | 101 kg |
| – 61 kg | Snatch | Martina Chiacchio (ITA) | 98 kg | Aysel Özkan (TUR) | 96 kg | María Olalla (ESP) | 90 kg |
| – 61 kg | Clean & Jerk | Martina Chiacchio (ITA) | 120 kg | María Olalla (ESP) | 112 kg | Eya Aouadi (TUN) | 107 kg |
| – 69 kg | Snatch | Giulia Miserendino (ITA) | 102 kg | Roufida Fathi (EGY) | 101 kg | Enkileda Carja (ALB) | 100 kg |
| – 69 kg | Clean & Jerk | Roufida Fathi (EGY) | 129 kg | Despoina Polaktsidou (GRE) | 128 kg | Nuray Güngör (TUR) | 124 kg |
| – 77 kg | Snatch | Sara Ahmed (EGY) | 110 kg | Genna Toko Kegne (ITA) | 105 kg | Tuğbanur Koz (TUR) | 104 kg |
| – 77 kg | Clean & Jerk | Sara Ahmed (EGY) | 137 kg | Genna Toko Kegne (ITA) | 127 kg | Tuğbanur Koz (TUR) | 117 kg |

== Men's results ==
=== Men's 65 kg ===
| Athlete | Group | Snatch (kg) | | | | Clean & Jerk (kg) | | | |
| Athlete | Group | 1 | 2 | 3 | Rank | 1 | 2 | 3 | Rank |
|---|---|---|---|---|---|---|---|---|---|
| Noureldin Zaky (EGY) | A | 127 | 131 | 133 | 1st place, gold medalist(s) | 153 | 158 | 161 | 2nd place, silver medalist(s) |
| Sergio Massidda (ITA) | A | 130 | ~~135~~ | ~~135~~ | 3rd place, bronze medalist(s) | 155 | 160 | 162 | 1st place, gold medalist(s) |
| Ferdi Hardal (TUR) | A | 128 | 132 | ~~134~~ | 2nd place, silver medalist(s) | 150 | 156 | ~~161~~ | 3rd place, bronze medalist(s) |
| Samoel Rrasa (ALB) | A | ~~116~~ | 116 | ~~128~~ | 4 | ~~145~~ | 145 | ~~151~~ | 4 |
| Konstantinos Lampridis (GRE) | A | 80 | — | — | 5 | 100 | — | — | 5 |

=== Men's 75 kg ===
| Athlete | Group | Snatch (kg) | | | | Clean & Jerk (kg) | | | |
| Athlete | Group | 1 | 2 | 3 | Rank | 1 | 2 | 3 | Rank |
|---|---|---|---|---|---|---|---|---|---|
| Yusuf Fehmi Genç (TUR) | A | 145 | 150 | 153 | 2nd place, silver medalist(s) | 182 | ~~186~~ | 187 | 1st place, gold medalist(s) |
| Briken Calja (ALB) | A | 147 | 152 | 154 | 1st place, gold medalist(s) | ~~183~~ | 184 | ~~187~~ | 3rd place, bronze medalist(s) |
| Karem Ben Hnia (TUN) | A | 148 | ~~151~~ | 151 | 3rd place, bronze medalist(s) | 183 | ~~186~~ | 186 | 2nd place, silver medalist(s) |
| Faris Durak (BIH) | A | ~~95~~ | ~~95~~ | ~~95~~ | — | 110 | ~~118~~ | ~~118~~ | 6 |
| Abdelrahman Hussein Metwally Hamouda Sayed Ahmed (EGY) | A | 149 | ~~152~~ | ~~153~~ | 4 | ~~183~~ | ~~185~~ | ~~186~~ | — |
| Bernardin Matam (FRA) | A | 126 | 129 | ~~131~~ | 6 | 160 | ~~166~~ | ~~166~~ | 5 |
| Kilian Gallart (ESP) | A | 137 | ~~141~~ | ~~141~~ | 5 | ~~155~~ | 155 | 165 | 4 |

=== Men's 85 kg ===
| Athlete | Group | Snatch (kg) | | | | Clean & Jerk (kg) | | | |
| Athlete | Group | 1 | 2 | 3 | Rank | 1 | 2 | 3 | Rank |
|---|---|---|---|---|---|---|---|---|---|
| Balázs Bencsik Masa (SRB) | A | 125 | ~~130~~ | ~~132~~ | 7 | 150 | ~~157~~ | ~~157~~ | 7 |
| Javier González (ESP) | A | 141 | ~~151~~ | ~~153~~ | 6 | 175 | ~~182~~ | ~~185~~ | 6 |
| Erkand Qerimaj (ALB) | A | 151 | ~~155~~ | ~~156~~ | 5 | 181 | 187 | ~~192~~ | 4 |
| Kerem Kurnaz (TUR) | A | 146 | 153 | ~~156~~ | 4 | 180 | ~~185~~ | ~~188~~ | 5 |
| Abdelrahman Younes (EGY) | A | 166 | 172 | — | 1st place, gold medalist(s) | 200 | 205 | ~~209~~ | 1st place, gold medalist(s) |
| Mohammed Al-Zintani (LBA) | A | 157 | 161 | 167 | 2nd place, silver medalist(s) | 193 | 201 | — | 2nd place, silver medalist(s) |
| Cristiano Ficco (ITA) | A | 152 | 155 | ~~160~~ | 3rd place, bronze medalist(s) | 186 | 190 | — | 3rd place, bronze medalist(s) |

=== Men's 95 kg ===
| Athlete | Group | Snatch (kg) | | | | Clean & Jerk (kg) | | | |
| Athlete | Group | 1 | 2 | 3 | Rank | 1 | 2 | 3 | Rank |
|---|---|---|---|---|---|---|---|---|---|
| Yann Thomasson (FRA) | A | 145 | ~~150~~ | 150 | 7 | 173 | 178 | ~~181~~ | 6 |
| Andranik Karapetyan (BIH) | A | 155 | ~~164~~ | ~~166~~ | 6 | — | — | — | — |
| Lorenzo Tarquini (ITA) | A | 150 | 155 | 162 | 5 | 185 | 193 | ~~197~~ | 5 |
| Ertjan Kofsha (ALB) | A | ~~161~~ | 162 | ~~166~~ | 4 | ~~192~~ | 194 | ~~196~~ | 4 |
| Hakan Şükrü Kurnaz (TUR) | A | ~~162~~ | ~~164~~ | ~~166~~ | — | 175 | — | — | 7 |
| Peter Dobnik (SLO) | A | 138 | 142 | ~~146~~ | 8 | ~~161~~ | 161 | ~~165~~ | 8 |
| Karim Abokahla (EGY) | A | ~~164~~ | 164 | ~~168~~ | 3rd place, bronze medalist(s) | ~~200~~ | 204 | — | 1st place, gold medalist(s) |
| Faris Touairi (ALG) | A | 162 | 165 | 169 | 1st place, gold medalist(s) | ~~192~~ | 195 | — | 3rd place, bronze medalist(s) |
| Kianoush Rostami (KOS) | A | ~~165~~ | 166 | ~~170~~ | 2nd place, silver medalist(s) | 196 | 203 | ~~211~~ | 2nd place, silver medalist(s) |

=== Men's 110 kg ===
| Athlete | Group | Snatch (kg) | | | | Clean & Jerk (kg) | | | |
| Athlete | Group | 1 | 2 | 3 | Rank | 1 | 2 | 3 | Rank |
|---|---|---|---|---|---|---|---|---|---|
| Aymen Touairi (ALG) | A | ~~167~~ | 170 | ~~175~~ | 5 | ~~207~~ | 209 | ~~212~~ | 1st place, gold medalist(s) |
| Benjamin Ferré (FRA) | A | 160 | 165 | ~~170~~ | 6 | — | — | — | — |
| Mahmoud Hosny Elsayed Hassan (EGY) | A | 168 | 172 | ~~177~~ | 4 | ~~208~~ | ~~210~~ | ~~210~~ | — |
| Aymen Bacha (TUN) | A | 176 | ~~181~~ | ~~183~~ | 2nd place, silver medalist(s) | ~~209~~ | ~~211~~ | — | — |
| Yasser Salem (BIH) | A | — | — | — | — | — | — | — | — |
| Muhammed Emin Burun (TUR) | A | ~~161~~ | ~~161~~ | 161 | 8 | 190 | ~~195~~ | ~~195~~ | 4 |
| Hamza Alasad Hallak (SYR) | A | 154 | 158 | 161 | 7 | 186 | 191 | ~~194~~ | 3rd place, bronze medalist(s) |
| Marcos Ruiz (ESP) | A | 175 | 180 | 185 | 1st place, gold medalist(s) | ~~205~~ | 208 | ~~212~~ | 2nd place, silver medalist(s) |
| Simone Abati (ITA) | A | 165 | 170 | 175 | 3rd place, bronze medalist(s) | 190 | ~~200~~ | ~~209~~ | 5 |

== Women's results ==
=== Women's 53 kg ===
| Athlete | Group | Snatch (kg) | | | | Clean & Jerk (kg) | | | |
| Athlete | Group | 1 | 2 | 3 | Rank | 1 | 2 | 3 | Rank |
|---|---|---|---|---|---|---|---|---|---|
| Cansel Özkan (TUR) | A | 85 | 88 | 91 | 1st place, gold medalist(s) | 101 | ~~104~~ | ~~106~~ | 3rd place, bronze medalist(s) |
| Maria Stratoudaki (GRE) | A | 80 | 82 | 83 | 2nd place, silver medalist(s) | 101 | 104 | ~~106~~ | 2nd place, silver medalist(s) |
| Alba Sánchez (ESP) | A | ~~80~~ | 81 | ~~84~~ | 4 | 100 | 103 | 105 | 1st place, gold medalist(s) |
| Celine Ludovica Delia (ITA) | A | 79 | 81 | ~~83~~ | 3rd place, bronze medalist(s) | 101 | ~~105~~ | ~~106~~ | 4 |
| Mema Eltantawi (EGY) | A | ~~73~~ | 74 | — | 5 | 93 | 100 | ~~102~~ | 5 |
| Radmila Zagorac (SRB) | A | 70 | 73 | ~~75~~ | 6 | 90 | ~~94~~ | 95 | 6 |
| Emma Ben Saieh (TUN) | A | ~~72~~ | ~~72~~ | ~~72~~ | — | ~~87~~ | 87 | ~~91~~ | 7 |

=== Women's 61 kg ===
| Athlete | Group | Snatch (kg) | | | | Clean & Jerk (kg) | | | |
| Athlete | Group | 1 | 2 | 3 | Rank | 1 | 2 | 3 | Rank |
|---|---|---|---|---|---|---|---|---|---|
| Martina Chiacchio (ITA) | A | 96 | ~~98~~ | 98 | 1st place, gold medalist(s) | 115 | 120 | — | 1st place, gold medalist(s) |
| María Olalla (ESP) | A | 90 | ~~95~~ | ~~95~~ | 3rd place, bronze medalist(s) | 112 | ~~116~~ | ~~116~~ | 2nd place, silver medalist(s) |
| Dimitra Ioannou (CYP) | A | 65 | 70 | ~~75~~ | 9 | 85 | 90 | ~~95~~ | 6 |
| Noura Mohamed (EGY) | A | 85 | 90 | 91 | 5 | ~~106~~ | ~~107~~ | ~~107~~ | — |
| Eya Aouadi (TUN) | A | ~~84~~ | ~~84~~ | 85 | 7 | 103 | 107 | ~~113~~ | 3rd place, bronze medalist(s) |
| Aysel Özkan (TUR) | A | 96 | ~~98~~ | ~~99~~ | 2nd place, silver medalist(s) | ~~116~~ | ~~116~~ | ~~116~~ | — |
| Maria Kardara (GRE) | A | 80 | 84 | 86 | 6 | 100 | ~~106~~ | 107 | 4 |
| Nadia El Samman (LBN) | A | ~~58~~ | ~~61~~ | ~~63~~ | — | 65 | ~~70~~ | ~~70~~ | 8 |
| Maëlyn Michel (FRA) | A | 90 | ~~95~~ | ~~95~~ | 4 | 105 | ~~110~~ | ~~113~~ | 5 |
| Petra Pavlič (SLO) | A | 70 | 75 | ~~78~~ | 8 | 88 | ~~91~~ | ~~92~~ | 7 |

=== Women's 69 kg ===
| Athlete | Group | Snatch (kg) | | | | Clean & Jerk (kg) | | | |
| Athlete | Group | 1 | 2 | 3 | Rank | 1 | 2 | 3 | Rank |
|---|---|---|---|---|---|---|---|---|---|
| Despoina Polaktsidou (GRE) | A | 95 | 99 | ~~102~~ | 4 | 122 | ~~125~~ | 128 | 2nd place, silver medalist(s) |
| Nuray Güngör (TUR) | A | ~~100~~ | ~~101~~ | ~~102~~ | — | ~~121~~ | 121 | 124 | 3rd place, bronze medalist(s) |
| Garoa Martínez (ESP) | A | ~~96~~ | 96 | ~~101~~ | 5 | 120 | ~~124~~ | ~~125~~ | 4 |
| Tenishia Thornton (MLT) | A | 90 | ~~92~~ | 92 | 7 | 113 | ~~116~~ | ~~116~~ | 8 |
| Alexa Marie Mina (LBN) | A | 80 | 84 | ~~87~~ | 10 | 100 | ~~104~~ | 104 | 10 |
| Jawaher Gesmi (TUN) | A | 87 | ~~91~~ | ~~91~~ | 9 | 119 | ~~123~~ | ~~124~~ | 6 |
| Giulia Miserendino (ITA) | A | 100 | 102 | ~~105~~ | 1st place, gold medalist(s) | 120 | ~~125~~ | ~~125~~ | 5 |
| Enkileda Carja (ALB) | A | 98 | 100 | ~~103~~ | 3rd place, bronze medalist(s) | 116 | ~~121~~ | ~~122~~ | 7 |
| Laurène Fauvel (FRA) | A | 91 | ~~93~~ | ~~94~~ | 8 | ~~113~~ | ~~113~~ | ~~113~~ | — |
| Roufida Fathi (EGY) | A | 93 | 99 | 101 | 2nd place, silver medalist(s) | 123 | 127 | 129 | 1st place, gold medalist(s) |
| Ech-Chaibia Ech-Chachouiy (MAR) | A | 91 | 94 | ~~97~~ | 6 | 113 | ~~116~~ | ~~117~~ | 9 |

=== Women's 77 kg ===
| Athlete | Group | Snatch (kg) | | | | Clean & Jerk (kg) | | | |
| Athlete | Group | 1 | 2 | 3 | Rank | 1 | 2 | 3 | Rank |
|---|---|---|---|---|---|---|---|---|---|
| Tuğbanur Koz (TUR) | A | ~~98~~ | 98 | 104 | 3rd place, bronze medalist(s) | 117 | ~~121~~ | ~~126~~ | 3rd place, bronze medalist(s) |
| Genna Toko Kegne (ITA) | A | 100 | 105 | ~~111~~ | 2nd place, silver medalist(s) | ~~127~~ | 127 | ~~135~~ | 2nd place, silver medalist(s) |
| Ivona Gavran (CRO) | A | 82 | 86 | 89 | 5 | ~~97~~ | 97 | 102 | 5 |
| Sara Ahmed (EGY) | A | 106 | 110 | — | 1st place, gold medalist(s) | 137 | — | — | 1st place, gold medalist(s) |
| Vicky Graillot (FRA) | A | 88 | 91 | 94 | 4 | ~~114~~ | 114 | ~~118~~ | 4 |
