= Martina Chiacchio =

Italian weightlifter (born 2000)

Personal information
- Nationality: Italian
- Born: 20 November 2000 (age 25) Palermo, Italy
- Height: 1.63 m (5 ft 4 in)
- Weight: 63 kg (139 lb)

Sport
- Country: Italy
- Sport: Weightlifting
- Event: Women's 63 kg
- Club: Fiamme Azzurre
Medal record
Women's Weightlifting
Representing Italy
European Junior Championships
Bronze medal – third place	2023 Bucharest	–63 kg
Mediterranean Games
Gold medal – first place	2026 Taranto	Snatch −64 kg

Martina Chiacchio (born 20 November 2000) is an Italian weightlifter. She won the Italian Senior Weightlifting Championships in 2023, 2024, and 2025, and finished second in the 2021 and 2022 editions. In 2023, he also won the bronze medal at the European Junior and U23 Weightlifting Championships. She won two gold medals in Weightlifting at the 2026 Mediterranean Games in Taranto.
