= 2024 European Weightlifting Championships =

Weightlifting competition in Sofia, Bulgaria

- Venue: Arena Sofia
- Location: Sofia, Bulgaria
- Dates: 12–20 February

The 2024 European Weightlifting Championships was held in Sofia, Bulgaria, from 12 to 20 February 2024.

== Medal table ==
Ranking by Big (Total result) medals

* Host nation (Bulgaria)

Rank	Nation	Gold	Silver	Bronze	Total
1	Armenia (ARM)	4	3	3	10
2	Bulgaria (BUL)*	4	2	1	7
3	Italy (ITA)	2	2	0	4
3	Ukraine (UKR)	2	2	0	4
5	Romania (ROU)	2	0	0	2
6	Turkey (TUR)	1	3	3	7
–	Individual Neutral Athletes	1	1	2	4
7	Poland (POL)	1	1	1	3
8	Norway (NOR)	1	0	1	2
9	Azerbaijan (AZE)	1	0	0	1
9	Great Britain (GBR)	1	0	0	1
11	Georgia (GEO)	0	2	1	3
12	Moldova (MDA)	0	1	1	2
13	Albania (ALB)	0	1	0	1
13	France (FRA)	0	1	0	1
13	Israel (ISR)	0	1	0	1
16	Germany (GER)	0	0	3	3
17	Finland (FIN)	0	0	1	1
17	Ireland (IRL)	0	0	1	1
17	Latvia (LAT)	0	0	1	1
17	Spain (ESP)	0	0	1	1
Totals (20 entries)		20	20	20	60

Ranking by all medals: Big (Total result) and Small (Snatch and Clean & Jerk)

* Host nation (Bulgaria)

Rank	Nation	Gold	Silver	Bronze	Total
1	Armenia (ARM)	11	7	8	26
2	Bulgaria (BUL)*	11	4	4	19
3	Italy (ITA)	6	5	2	13
4	Turkey (TUR)	5	8	11	24
5	Ukraine (UKR)	5	6	2	13
6	Romania (ROU)	5	1	2	8
7	Poland (POL)	4	2	2	8
8	Norway (NOR)	4	0	1	5
–	Individual Neutral Athletes	3	4	7	14
9	Azerbaijan (AZE)	3	0	0	3
10	Great Britain (GBR)	2	1	1	4
11	Georgia (GEO)	1	4	3	8
12	Moldova (MDA)	0	4	1	5
13	Israel (ISR)	0	3	1	4
14	Albania (ALB)	0	3	0	3
15	Germany (GER)	0	2	5	7
16	Spain (ESP)	0	1	3	4
17	Belgium (BEL)	0	1	1	2
17	Denmark (DEN)	0	1	1	2
17	Finland (FIN)	0	1	1	2
17	France (FRA)	0	1	1	2
17	Latvia (LAT)	0	1	1	2
22	Ireland (IRL)	0	0	2	2
Totals (22 entries)		60	60	60	180

== Schedule ==
Men's events
Date →	Tue 13		Wed 14		Thu 15		Fri 16		Sat 17		Sun 18			Mon 19			Tue 20	
Event ↓	14:00	20:00	14:00	20:00	12:00	20:00	14:00	20:00	12:00	17:00	11:00	14:00	20:00	10:00	14:00	17:00	10:00	16:00
55 kg	A																	
61 kg		A																
67 kg			B	A														
73 kg					B	A												
81 kg							B	A										
89 kg									B	A								
96 kg											B		A					
102 kg												B			A			
109 kg														B		A		
+109 kg																	B	A

Women's events
Date →	Mon 12			Tue 13		Wed 14		Thu 15			Fri 16			Sat 17		Sun 18	Mon 19		Tue 20
Event ↓	13:00	15:30	17:30	12:00	17:00	12:00	17:00	10:00	14:00	17:00	10:00	12:00	17:00	10:00	20:00	17:00	12:00	20:00	13:00
45 kg	B	A																	
49 kg	B		A																
55 kg				B	A														
59 kg						B	A												
64 kg								C	B	A									
71 kg											C	B	A						
76 kg														B	A				
81 kg																A			
87 kg																	B	A	
+87 kg																	B		A

== Medal overview ==
=== Men ===
Event		Gold		Silver		Bronze	
– 55 kg	Snatch	Muammer Şahin (TUR)	112 kg	Ramini Shamilishvili (GEO)	111 kg	Angel Rusev (BUL)	109 kg
– 55 kg	Clean & Jerk	Angel Rusev (BUL)	135 kg	Dzhan Zarkov (BUL)	133 kg	Josué Brachi (ESP)	131 kg
– 55 kg	Total	Angel Rusev (BUL)	244 kg	Ramini Shamilishvili (GEO)	241 kg	Dzhan Zarkov (BUL)	235 kg
– 61 kg	Snatch	Ivan Dimov (BUL)	130 kg	Pavlo Zalipskyi (UKR)	126 kg	Shota Mishvelidze (GEO)	125 kg
– 61 kg	Clean & Jerk	Gabriel Marinov (BUL)	160 kg	Valentin Iancu (ROU)	154 kg	Ivan Dimov (BUL)	150 kg
– 61 kg	Total	Gabriel Marinov (BUL)	281 kg	Ivan Dimov (BUL)	280 kg	Shota Mishvelidze (GEO)	272 kg
– 67 kg	Snatch	Kaan Kahriman (TUR)	142 kg	Sergio Massidda (ITA)	141 kg	Gor Sahakyan (ARM)	140 kg
– 67 kg	Clean & Jerk	Gor Sahakyan (ARM)	171 kg	Ferdi Hardal (TUR)	169 kg	Kaan Kahriman (TUR)	168 kg
– 67 kg	Total	Gor Sahakyan (ARM)	311 kg	Kaan Kahriman (TUR)	310 kg	Ferdi Hardal (TUR)	304 kg
– 73 kg	Snatch	Bozhidar Andreev (BUL)	155 kg	Ritvars Suharevs (LAT)	154 kg	Mirko Zanni (ITA)	153 kg
– 73 kg	Clean & Jerk	Bozhidar Andreev (BUL)	193 kg ER	Muhammed Furkan Özbek (TUR)	186 kg	Yusuf Fehmi Genç (TUR)	184 kg
– 73 kg	Total	Bozhidar Andreev (BUL)	348 kg ER	Muhammed Furkan Özbek (TUR)	336 kg	Ritvars Suharevs (LAT)	331 kg
– 81 kg	Snatch	Oscar Reyes (ITA)	155 kg	Erkand Qerimaj (ALB)	155 kg	Rafik Harutyunyan (ARM)	154 kg
– 81 kg	Clean & Jerk	Oscar Reyes (ITA)	191 kg	Kristi Ramadani (ALB)	190 kg	Patryk Bęben (POL)	183 kg
– 81 kg	Total	Oscar Reyes (ITA)	346 kg	Kristi Ramadani (ALB)	341 kg	Rafik Harutyunyan (ARM)	336 kg
– 89 kg	Snatch	Karlos Nasar (BUL)	176 kg WJR	Marin Robu (MDA)	171 kg	Antonino Pizzolato (ITA)	170 kg
– 89 kg	Clean & Jerk	Karlos Nasar (BUL)	215 kg	Antonino Pizzolato (ITA)	210 kg	Petr Asayonak (AIN)	207 kg
– 89 kg	Total	Karlos Nasar (BUL)	391 kg	Antonino Pizzolato (ITA)	380 kg	Marin Robu (MDA)	378 kg
– 96 kg	Snatch	Davit Hovhannisyan (ARM)	169 kg	Hakob Mkrtchyan (ARM)	166 kg	Pavel Khadasevich (AIN)	165 kg
– 96 kg	Clean & Jerk	Hakob Mkrtchyan (ARM)	209 kg	Davit Hovhannisyan (ARM)	205 kg	Yulian Kurlovich (AIN)	196 kg
– 96 kg	Total	Hakob Mkrtchyan (ARM)	375 kg	Davit Hovhannisyan (ARM)	374 kg	Pavel Khadasevich (AIN)	360 kg
– 102 kg	Snatch	Garik Karapetyan (ARM)	182 kg	Yauheni Tsikhantsou (AIN)	181 kg	Samvel Gasparyan (ARM)	180 kg
– 102 kg	Clean & Jerk	Yauheni Tsikhantsou (AIN)	217 kg	Samvel Gasparyan (ARM)	216 kg	Irakli Chkheidze (GEO)	212 kg
– 102 kg	Total	Yauheni Tsikhantsou (AIN)	398 kg	Samvel Gasparyan (ARM)	396 kg	Garik Karapetyan (ARM)	394 kg
– 109 kg	Snatch	Dadash Dadashbayli (AZE)	176 kg	Hristo Hristov (BUL)	175 kg	Matthäus Hofmann (GER)	172 kg
– 109 kg	Clean & Jerk	Dadash Dadashbayli (AZE)	212 kg	Onur Demirci (TUR)	207 kg	Matthäus Hofmann (GER)	206 kg
– 109 kg	Total	Dadash Dadashbayli (AZE)	388 kg	Hristo Hristov (BUL)	380 kg	Matthäus Hofmann (GER)	378 kg
+ 109 kg	Snatch	Varazdat Lalayan (ARM)	205 kg	Eduard Ziaziulin (AIN)	195 kg	Simon Martirosyan (ARM)	190 kg
+ 109 kg	Clean & Jerk	Varazdat Lalayan (ARM)	250 kg	Simon Martirosyan (ARM)	247 kg	Eduard Ziaziulin (AIN)	241 kg
+ 109 kg	Total	Varazdat Lalayan (ARM)	455 kg	Simon Martirosyan (ARM)	437 kg	Eduard Ziaziulin (AIN)	436 kg

=== Women ===
Event		Gold		Silver		Bronze	
– 45 kg	Snatch	Cansu Bektaş (TUR)	75 kg	Marta García (ESP)	72 kg	Nadezhda Nguen (BUL)	69 kg
– 45 kg	Clean & Jerk	Gamze Altun (TUR)	92 kg	Cansu Bektaş (TUR)	88 kg	Ioana Miron (ROU)	85 kg
– 45 kg	Total	Cansu Bektaş (TUR)	163 kg	Gamze Altun (TUR)	157 kg	Marta García (ESP)	156 kg
– 49 kg	Snatch	Mihaela Cambei (ROU)	90 kg	Duygu Alıcı (TUR)	78 kg	Sira Armengou (ESP)	74 kg
– 49 kg	Clean & Jerk	Mihaela Cambei (ROU)	109 kg	Oliwia Drzazga (POL)	96 kg	Tham Nguyen (IRL)	95 kg
– 49 kg	Total	Mihaela Cambei (ROU)	199 kg ER	Oliwia Drzazga (POL)	170 kg	Tham Nguyen (IRL)	169 kg
– 55 kg	Snatch	Sol Anette Waaler (NOR)	86 kg	Yulia Hulina (AIN)	85 kg	Burcu Alıcı (TUR)	85 kg
– 55 kg	Clean & Jerk	Aleksandra Grigoryan (ARM)	115 kg	Celine Ludovica Delia (ITA)	111 kg	Burcu Alıcı (TUR)	105 kg
– 55 kg	Total	Aleksandra Grigoryan (ARM)	196 kg	Celine Ludovica Delia (ITA)	195 kg	Sol Anette Waaler (NOR)	190 kg
– 59 kg	Snatch	Kamila Konotop (UKR)	105 kg	Nina Sterckx (BEL)	101 kg	Dora Tchakounté (FRA)	98 kg
– 59 kg	Clean & Jerk	Kamila Konotop (UKR)	125 kg	Saara Retulainen (FIN)	119 kg	Andreea Cotruţa (ROU)	118 kg
– 59 kg	Total	Kamila Konotop (UKR)	230 kg	Dora Tchakounté (FRA)	215 kg	Saara Retulainen (FIN)	214 kg
– 64 kg	Snatch	Svitlana Samuliak (UKR)	101 kg	Hanna Davydova (UKR)	100 kg	Aysel Özkan (TUR)	98 kg
– 64 kg	Clean & Jerk	Wiktoria Wołk (POL)	121 kg	Hanna Davydova (UKR)	120 kg	Svitlana Samuliak (UKR)	118 kg
– 64 kg	Total	Hanna Davydova (UKR)	220 kg	Svitlana Samuliak (UKR)	219 kg	Wiktoria Wołk (POL)	215 kg
– 71 kg	Snatch	Loredana Toma (ROU)	114 kg	Lisa Schweizer (GER)	107 kg	Siuzanna Valodzka (AIN)	105 kg
– 71 kg	Clean & Jerk	Siuzanna Valodzka (AIN)	130 kg	Celia Gold (ISR)	128 kg	Sarah Davies (GBR)	128 kg
– 71 kg	Total	Loredana Toma (ROU)	241 kg	Siuzanna Valodzka (AIN)	235 kg	Lisa Schweizer (GER)	231 kg
– 76 kg	Snatch	Genna Toko Kegne (ITA)	101 kg	Lara Dancz (GER)	101 kg	Nicole Rubanovich (ISR)	99 kg
– 76 kg	Clean & Jerk	Genna Toko Kegne (ITA)	126 kg	Nicole Rubanovich (ISR)	117 kg	Laura Vest Tolstrup (DEN)	116 kg
– 76 kg	Total	Genna Toko Kegne (ITA)	227 kg	Nicole Rubanovich (ISR)	216 kg	Lara Dancz (GER)	215 kg
– 81 kg	Snatch	Weronika Zielińska-Stubińska (POL)	103 kg	Elena Erighina (MDA)	103 kg	Ilke Lagrou (BEL)	103 kg
– 81 kg	Clean & Jerk	Weronika Zielińska-Stubińska (POL)	132 kg	Elena Erighina (MDA)	131 kg	Dilara Narin (TUR)	125 kg
– 81 kg	Total	Weronika Zielińska-Stubińska (POL)	235 kg	Elena Erighina (MDA)	234 kg	Dilara Narin (TUR)	222 kg
– 87 kg	Snatch	Solfrid Koanda (NOR)	120 kg	Anne Vejsgaard Jensen (DEN)	107 kg	Hripsime Khurshudyan (ARM)	105 kg
– 87 kg	Clean & Jerk	Solfrid Koanda (NOR)	160 kg	Anastasiia Manievska (UKR)	128 kg	Büşra Çan (TUR)	127 kg
– 87 kg	Total	Solfrid Koanda (NOR)	280 kg	Anastasiia Manievska (UKR)	230 kg	Hripsime Khurshudyan (ARM)	227 kg
+ 87 kg	Snatch	Anastasiia Hotfrid (GEO)	117 kg	Emily Campbell (GBR)	112 kg	Valentyna Kisil (UKR)	108 kg
+ 87 kg	Clean & Jerk	Emily Campbell (GBR)	151 kg	Anastasiia Hotfrid (GEO)	140 kg	Fatmagül Çevik (TUR)	131 kg
+ 87 kg	Total	Emily Campbell (GBR)	263 kg	Anastasiia Hotfrid (GEO)	257 kg	Fatmagül Çevik (TUR)	238 kg

== Men's results ==
=== Men's 55 kg ===
Rank	Athlete	Group	Body weight	Snatch (kg)				Clean & Jerk (kg)				Total
Rank	Athlete	Group	Body weight	1	2	3	Rank	1	2	3	Rank	Total
1st place, gold medalist(s)	Angel Rusev (BUL)	A	54.93	105	109	~~111~~	3rd place, bronze medalist(s)	135	~~140~~	—	1st place, gold medalist(s)	244
2nd place, silver medalist(s)	Ramini Shamilishvili (GEO)	A	54.73	106	109	111	2nd place, silver medalist(s)	126	130	~~134~~	4	241
3rd place, bronze medalist(s)	Dzhan Zarkov (BUL)	A	54.78	95	99	102	8	123	129	133	2nd place, silver medalist(s)	235
4	Marian-Cristian Luca (ROU)	A	55.00	102	106	~~110~~	5	125	128	~~131~~	5	234
5	Muammer Şahin (TUR)	A	55.00	110	~~112~~	112	1st place, gold medalist(s)	121	~~125~~	~~125~~	9	233
6	Goderdzi Berdelidze (GEO)	A	54.83	~~107~~	107	~~110~~	4	~~123~~	~~123~~	123	8	230
7	Harun Algül (TUR)	A	54.92	104	~~107~~	~~110~~	6	125	~~130~~	~~130~~	6	229
8	Dmytro Voronovskyi (UKR)	A	55.00	~~103~~	103	~~106~~	7	123	~~129~~	~~130~~	7	226
9	Iulian Betca (MDA)	A	54.92	~~98~~	98	~~103~~	9	~~115~~	115	~~119~~	10	217
10	Andrian Comerzan (MDA)	A	55.00	85	~~89~~	89	10	105	110	~~115~~	12	199
11	Alexandr Džobák (CZE)	A	52.96	~~85~~	86	~~90~~	11	110	~~115~~	~~116~~	11	196
—	Josué Brachi (ESP)	A	55.00	~~108~~	~~108~~	~~110~~	—	125	~~130~~	131	3rd place, bronze medalist(s)	—

=== Men's 61 kg ===
Rank	Athlete	Group	Body weight	Snatch (kg)				Clean & Jerk (kg)				Total
Rank	Athlete	Group	Body weight	1	2	3	Rank	1	2	3	Rank	Total
1st place, gold medalist(s)	Gabriel Marinov (BUL)	A	60.96	118	~~121~~	121	5	152	160	—	1st place, gold medalist(s)	281
2nd place, silver medalist(s)	Ivan Dimov (BUL)	A	60.88	130	~~133~~	~~133~~	1st place, gold medalist(s)	~~150~~	~~150~~	150	3rd place, bronze medalist(s)	280
3rd place, bronze medalist(s)	Shota Mishvelidze (GEO)	A	61.00	121	~~125~~	125	3rd place, bronze medalist(s)	143	147	~~156~~	4	272
4	Pavlo Zalipskyi (UKR)	A	60.98	121	124	126	2nd place, silver medalist(s)	141	~~144~~	145	6	271
5	Valentin Iancu (ROU)	A	60.99	115	~~120~~	~~121~~	8	145	151	154	2nd place, silver medalist(s)	269
6	Mustafa Eliş (TUR)	A	60.79	116	~~119~~	119	6	~~145~~	146	~~150~~	5	265
7	Daniel Lungu (MDA)	A	60.85	120	124	~~126~~	4	~~135~~	135	~~141~~	9	259
8	Ion Badanev (MDA)	A	60.61	110	115	~~120~~	9	135	140	145	7	258
9	Stefan Vladisavljev (SRB)	A	60.88	113	116	~~119~~	7	137	~~141~~	141	8	257
—	Hampton Morris (USA) (Note: USA Weightlifting Team announced that they will participate in EWC 2024 instead of 2024 Pan American Weightlifting Championships due to political reasons.)	A	61.00	~~122~~	122	126	—	168	171	~~173~~	—	297

=== Men's 67 kg ===
Rank	Athlete	Group	Body weight	Snatch (kg)				Clean & Jerk (kg)				Total
Rank	Athlete	Group	Body weight	1	2	3	Rank	1f	2	3	Rank	Total
1st place, gold medalist(s)	Gor Sahakyan (ARM)	A	67.00	140	~~143~~	~~143~~	3rd place, bronze medalist(s)	171	~~173~~	—	1st place, gold medalist(s)	311
2nd place, silver medalist(s)	Kaan Kahriman (TUR)	A	67.00	140	~~142~~	142	1st place, gold medalist(s)	163	~~167~~	168	3rd place, bronze medalist(s)	310
3rd place, bronze medalist(s)	Ferdi Hardal (TUR)	A	67.00	135	~~138~~	~~139~~	7	167	169	~~172~~	2nd place, silver medalist(s)	304
4	Sergio Massidda (ITA)	A	65.29	135	~~140~~	141	2nd place, silver medalist(s)	162	~~167~~	~~167~~	5	304
5	Isa Rustamov (AZE)	B	66.82	130	134	137	4	155	162	~~167~~	4	303
6	Henadz Laptseu (AIN)	A	66.99	135	~~140~~	~~140~~	6	160	~~165~~	~~165~~	7	299
7	Acorán Hernández (ESP)	B	66.75	132	135	~~138~~	5	156	~~160~~	~~160~~	10	295
8	Valentin Genchev (BUL)	A	66.83	125	128	130	10	160	~~166~~	~~166~~	6	291
9	Goga Chkheidze (GEO)	A	66.83	128	132	~~136~~	9	157	~~167~~	~~168~~	9	290
10	Dian Pampordzhiev (BUL)	A	67.00	120	125	~~128~~	12	153	159	~~166~~	8	284
11	Víctor Castro (ESP)	B	66.73	125	130	133	8	145	150	~~153~~	11	283
12	Tehran Mammadov (AZE)	B	65.84	120	125	~~129~~	11	140	145	150	12	275
13	Dimitris Minasidis (CYP)	A	67.00	~~121~~	121	~~126~~	14	150	–	–	13	271
14	Marek Komorowski (POL)	B	66.90	~~121~~	121	~~125~~	13	145	~~150~~	~~150~~	16	266
15	Konstantinos Lampridis (GRE)	B	65.20	110	115	119	15	137	143	147	14	266
16	Petr Stránský (CZE)	B	66.91	~~117~~	117	~~120~~	16	143	~~146~~	146	15	263
17	Faris Durak (BIH)	B	66.48	95	100	~~103~~	17	110	~~117~~	~~119~~	14	210
—	Simon Brandhuber (GER)	B	65.49	—	—	—	—	—	—	—	—	—

=== Men's 73 kg ===
Rank	Athlete	Group	Body weight	Snatch (kg)				Clean & Jerk (kg)				Total
Rank	Athlete	Group	Body weight	1	2	3	Rank	1	2	3	Rank	Total
1st place, gold medalist(s)	Bozhidar Andreev (BUL)	A	73.00	~~150~~	150	155	1st place, gold medalist(s)	181	185	193	1st place, gold medalist(s)	348
2nd place, silver medalist(s)	Muhammed Furkan Özbek (TUR)	A	72.00	145	148	150	6	~~185~~	~~185~~	186	2nd place, silver medalist(s)	336
3rd place, bronze medalist(s)	Ritvars Suharevs (LAT)	A	73.00	150	~~154~~	154	2nd place, silver medalist(s)	~~177~~	177	~~183~~	8	331
4	Roberto Gutu (GER)	B	73.00	~~147~~	~~147~~	151	5	173	178	~~182~~	7	329
5	Briken Calja (ALB)	A	72.90	~~148~~	148	~~153~~	7	180	~~185~~	~~186~~	5	328
6	Yusuf Fehmi Genç (TUR)	A	69.77	140	144	~~146~~	12	180	184	~~186~~	3rd place, bronze medalist(s)	328
7	Max Lang (GER)	A	73.00	140	144	147	10	175	180	~~186~~	6	327
8	Bernardin Kingue Matam (FRA)	A	72.99	138	142	~~145~~	13	177	~~182~~	182	4	324
9	Omar Javadov (AZE)	B	72.61	146	150	152	4	166	~~171~~	~~171~~	11	318
10	Tiberiu Donose (ROU)	B	73.00	140	~~146~~	~~146~~	14	165	170	175	9	315
11	Archil Malakmadze (GEO)	B	72.97	141	146	~~151~~	11	163	168	~~173~~	10	314
12	Jonathan Chin (GBR)	B	73.00	125	~~130~~	~~131~~	16	~~163~~	163	~~171~~	12	288
13	Jonas Aufdenblatten (SUI)	B	72.81	118	122	~~126~~	17	145	152	~~155~~	13	274
14	Fran Čubranić (CRO)	B	72.72	103	108	~~112~~	18	135	140	~~147~~	14	248
—	Mirko Zanni (ITA)	A	72.81	150	~~153~~	153	3rd place, bronze medalist(s)	~~183~~	~~183~~	~~183~~	—	—
—	David Sánchez (ESP)	B	73.00	~~147~~	147	~~151~~	8	—	—	—	—	—
—	Christopher Murray (GBR)	B	72.62	~~143~~	143	147	9	~~179~~	~~179~~	~~183~~	—	—
—	Piotr Kudłaszyk (POL)	A	72.71	~~138~~	138	~~141~~	15	~~178~~	~~180~~	~~180~~	—	—
—	Caden Cahoy (USA)	A	73.00	140	144	~~148~~	—	180	185	~~190~~	—	329
—	Ryan Grimsland (USA)	A	72.98	142	~~147~~	~~148~~	—	182	~~187~~	~~192~~	—	324

=== Men's 81 kg ===
Rank	Athlete	Group	Body weight	Snatch (kg)				Clean & Jerk (kg)				Total
Rank	Athlete	Group	Body weight	1	2	3	Rank	1	2	3	Rank	Total
1st place, gold medalist(s)	Oscar Reyes Martinez (ITA)	A	79.55	152	155	~~157~~	1st place, gold medalist(s)	187	191	—	1st place, gold medalist(s)	346
2nd place, silver medalist(s)	Kristi Ramadani (ALB)	B	81.00	147	151	~~153~~	4	180	186	190	2nd place, silver medalist(s)	341
3rd place, bronze medalist(s)	Rafik Harutyunyan (ARM)	A	80.91	150	154	~~157~~	3rd place, bronze medalist(s)	182	~~188~~	~~189~~	5	336
4	Erkand Qerimaj (ALB)	A	80.80	~~152~~	152	155	2nd place, silver medalist(s)	180	~~186~~	~~186~~	6	335
5	Patryk Bęben (POL)	A	81.00	145	150	~~153~~	6	177	183	~~187~~	3rd place, bronze medalist(s)	333
6	Dmytro Kondratiuk (UKR)	A	81.00	137	141	144	9	178	183	~~188~~	4	327
7	Petr Mareček (CZE)	A	80.47	146	151	~~153~~	5	~~175~~	175	~~181~~	7	326
8	Sebastian Cabala (SVK)	A	79.98	~~140~~	142	~~144~~	10	170	174	~~178~~	9	316
9	Alberto Fernández (ESP)	A	80.66	145	~~150~~	~~153~~	7	170	~~175~~	~~175~~	11	315
10	Victor Morosanu (MDA)	A	80.87	145	~~150~~	~~150~~	8	170	~~175~~	~~175~~	12	315
11	Žilvinas Žilinskas (LTU)	B	80.95	134	~~139~~	140	13	165	170	174	8	314
12	Fugan Aliyev (AZE)	B	80.59	135	140	~~143~~	12	168	173	~~178~~	10	313
13	Constantin Bratu (MDA)	A	80.66	140	~~143~~	~~143~~	14	170	~~175~~	~~175~~	13	310
14	Hmayak Misakyan (AUT)	A	80.87	141	~~146~~	~~146~~	11	165	~~170~~	~~170~~	14	306
15	Miguel Almeida (POR)	B	80.17	130	~~137~~	137	15	160	~~172~~	~~172~~	15	297
16	João Moreira (POR)	B	78.68	110	116	120	17	140	~~146~~	~~146~~	16	260
—	Ravin Almammadov (AZE)	B	81.00	135	~~140~~	~~140~~	16	—	—	—	—	—

=== Men's 89 kg ===
Rank	Athlete	Group	Body weight	Snatch (kg)				Clean & Jerk (kg)				Total
Rank	Athlete	Group	Body weight	1	2	3	Rank	1	2	3	Rank	Total
1st place, gold medalist(s)	Karlos Nasar (BUL)	A	87.39	168	173	176	1st place, gold medalist(s)	208	215	—	1st place, gold medalist(s)	391
2nd place, silver medalist(s)	Antonino Pizzolato (ITA)	A	89.00	170	~~175~~	~~175~~	3rd place, bronze medalist(s)	210	~~215~~	~~222~~	2nd place, silver medalist(s)	380
3rd place, bronze medalist(s)	Marin Robu (MDA)	A	88.79	165	~~171~~	171	2nd place, silver medalist(s)	195	202	207	4	378
4	Petr Asayonak (AIN)	A	88.83	~~167~~	~~167~~	167	5	~~200~~	200	207	3rd place, bronze medalist(s)	374
5	Andranik Karapetyan (ARM)	A	89.00	170	~~175~~	~~175~~	4	195	~~204~~	~~204~~	7	365
6	Nico Müller (GER)	A	89.00	153	~~158~~	158	8	190	195	201	5	359
7	Armands Mežinskis (LAT)	A	88.97	155	159	163	6	195	~~200~~	~~201~~	6	358
8	Raphael Friedrich (GER)	A	88.27	153	158	~~161~~	7	183	188	~~192~~	8	346
9	Theodoros Iakovidis (GRE)	A	88.23	152	157	~~162~~	9	178	184	~~189~~	10	341
10	Omed Alam (DEN)	B	89.00	143	147	150	10	180	~~186~~	~~186~~	11	330
11	Seán Brown (IRL)	B	88.30	~~141~~	~~141~~	141	12	169	173	177	13	318
12	Elias Simbürger (AUT)	B	87.55	~~138~~	~~138~~	138	14	170	~~174~~	178	12	316
13	Dominik Certov (AUT)	B	86.21	138	~~141~~	141	11	166	~~171~~	~~171~~	15	307
14	Youssef El Amrani (BEL)	B	87.25	133	~~137~~	137	15	167	~~171~~	~~171~~	14	304
15	Zerin Kobilić (BIH)	B	88.22	105	110	115	16	~~135~~	135	142	16	257
—	Ertjan Kofsha (ALB)	A	88.80	~~155~~	~~158~~	~~158~~	—	185	~~187~~	—	9	—
—	Nurlan Mammadzada (AZE)	B	86.00	130	135	140	13	~~165~~	~~165~~	—	—	—
—	Maksym Dombrovskyi (UKR)	A	89.00	—	—	—	—	—	—	—	—	—
—	Leho Pent (EST)	B	89.00	—	—	—	—	—	—	—	—	—
—	Clarence Cummings (USA)	B	88.40	143	~~148~~	151	—	181	190	~~195~~	—	341
—	Nathan Damron (USA)	A	89.00	~~160~~	~~166~~	~~166~~	—	—	—	—	—	—

=== Men's 96 kg ===
Rank	Athlete	Group	Body weight	Snatch (kg)				Clean & Jerk (kg)				Total
Rank	Athlete	Group	Body weight	1	2	3	Rank	1	2	3	Rank	Total
1st place, gold medalist(s)	Hakob Mkrtchyan (ARM)	A	95.84	161	166	~~168~~	2nd place, silver medalist(s)	200	205	209	1st place, gold medalist(s)	375
2nd place, silver medalist(s)	Davit Hovhannisyan (ARM)	A	95.97	~~166~~	166	169	1st place, gold medalist(s)	200	205	~~210~~	2nd place, silver medalist(s)	374
3rd place, bronze medalist(s)	Pavel Khadasevich (AIN)	A	96.00	165	~~168~~	~~168~~	3rd place, bronze medalist(s)	195	~~200~~	~~206~~	4	360
4	Yulian Kurlovich (AIN)	A	93.83	~~157~~	157	~~163~~	7	192	196	~~201~~	3rd place, bronze medalist(s)	353
5	Anton Serdiukov (UKR)	A	95.15	~~160~~	160	~~164~~	5	188	192	~~197~~	6	352
6	Patryk Sawulski (POL)	A	95.14	152	156	158	6	188	192	~~197~~	7	350
7	Enes Çelik (TUR)	A	94.85	160	162	~~166~~	4	180	185	~~189~~	13	347
8	Manuel Sánchez (ESP)	B	95.56	~~151~~	151	155	8	185	191	~~196~~	8	346
9	Zurab Mskhaladze (GEO)	A	91.12	151	~~156~~	~~156~~	12	185	192	~~197~~	5	343
10	Stanislav Maznitsyn (ISR)	A	95.97	~~151~~	151	~~155~~	13	190	~~196~~	~~196~~	10	341
11	Jiří Gasior (CZE)	B	95.97	148	~~151~~	152	9	182	188	~~192~~	11	340
12	Cyrille Tchatchet (GBR)	B	93.39	~~151~~	~~151~~	151	11	~~185~~	188	~~196~~	12	339
13	Karol Samko (SVK)	B	95.95	136	140	~~144~~	17	185	191	~~201~~	9	331
14	Josef Kolář (CZE)	B	96.00	~~151~~	151	~~156~~	10	179	~~184~~	~~184~~	14	330
15	Yannick Tschan (SUI)	B	95.05	142	146	~~148~~	14	178	~~182~~	~~184~~	15	324
16	Claudiu Popa (ROU)	B	92.75	140	~~145~~	145	15	~~163~~	163	~~168~~	17	308
17	Shane Roche (IRL)	B	92.00	~~136~~	136	~~140~~	18	165	~~169~~	~~169~~	16	301
18	Peter Dobnik (SLO)	B	95.47	135	141	143	16	156	~~162~~	~~163~~	18	299
19	Francisco Lourenço (POR)	B	94.01	125	13	~~141~~	19	155	~~163~~	~~165~~	19	288
—	Ermand Tabaku (ALB)	B	94.68	~~150~~	~~150~~	~~150~~	—	—	—	—	—	—
—	Romain Imadouchène (FRA)	B	93.03	—	—	—	—	—	—	—	—	—
—	Bartłomiej Adamus (POL)	A	95.16	~~150~~	~~150~~	~~150~~	—	—	—	—	—	—

=== Men's 102 kg ===
Rank	Athlete	Group	Body weight	Snatch (kg)				Clean & Jerk (kg)				Total
Rank	Athlete	Group	Body weight	1	2	3	Rank	1	2	3	Rank	Total
1st place, gold medalist(s)	Yauheni Tsikhantsou (AIN)	A	101.71	~~176~~	176	181	2nd place, silver medalist(s)	211	217	~~225~~	1st place, gold medalist(s)	398
2nd place, silver medalist(s)	Samvel Gasparyan (ARM)	A	102.00	173	177	180	3rd place, bronze medalist(s)	211	~~216~~	216	2nd place, silver medalist(s)	396
3rd place, bronze medalist(s)	Garik Karapetyan (ARM)	A	102.00	177	182	~~187~~	1st place, gold medalist(s)	~~211~~	212	~~217~~	5	394
4	Siarhei Sharankou (AIN)	A	101.98	170	176	178	4	205	212	~~215~~	4	390
5	Irakli Chkheidze (GEO)	A	101.68	168	174	~~178~~	6	212	~~217~~	~~218~~	3rd place, bronze medalist(s)	386
6	Tudor Bratu (MDA)	B	100.00	165	170	175	5	200	210	~~215~~	6	385
7	Vasil Marinov (BUL)	A	102.00	173	~~177~~	~~177~~	7	208	~~213~~	~~215~~	8	381
8	Ali Shukurlu (AZE)	B	101.32	158	163	~~170~~	10	192	198	~~202~~	10	361
9	Brandon Vautard (FRA)	B	102.00	~~150~~	~~150~~	150	15	202	~~209~~	210	7	360
10	Yevhenii Yantsevych (UKR)	B	101.95	160	164	~~167~~	9	190	194	~~197~~	12	358
11	Artur Mugurdumov (ISR)	A	102.00	156	~~160~~	~~160~~	14	195	200	~~205~~	9	356
12	Redon Manushi (FRA)	B	100.63	~~160~~	160	~~165~~	11	183	~~186~~	~~186~~	14	343
13	Andrew Griffiths (GBR)	B	101.94	151	~~157~~	157	13	~~182~~	182	~~187~~	16	339
14	Irmantas Kačinskas (LTU)	B	101.86	~~145~~	150	158	12	180	~~186~~	~~186~~	18	338
15	Jacob Diakovasilis (DEN)	B	101.69	145	~~149~~	149	16	181	187	~~192~~	13	336
16	Roni Peltonen (FIN)	B	101.94	141	~~145~~	148	17	180	~~189~~	~~190~~	17	328
17	Martin Štreichl (CZE)	B	99.93	138	~~142~~	142	19	178	182	~~188~~	15	324
18	João Melo (POR)	B	97.64	125	130	~~135~~	20	156	~~160~~	—	19	286
—	Daniel Goljasz (POL)	A	99.36	~~159~~	~~160~~	~~160~~	—	198	~~203~~	~~206~~	11	—
—	Artūrs Plēsnieks (LAT)	A	101.76	~~168~~	168	173	8	~~208~~	~~208~~	~~210~~	—	—
—	Arnas Šidiškis (LTU)	B	101.86	145	~~150~~	~~150~~	18	~~176~~	~~176~~	—	—	—
—	Arsen Kasabijew (POL)	A	102.00	~~165~~	~~165~~	~~165~~	—	—	—	—	—	—
—	Ryan Sester (USA)	A	101.50	160	~~167~~	~~171~~	—	~~197~~	~~198~~	200	—	360
—	Wesley Kitts (USA)	A	101.85	—	—	—	—	—	—	—	—	—

=== Men's 109 kg ===
Rank	Athlete	Group	Body weight	Snatch (kg)				Clean & Jerk (kg)				Total
Rank	Athlete	Group	Body weight	1	2	3	Rank	1	2	3	Rank	Total
1st place, gold medalist(s)	Dadash Dadashbayli (AZE)	A	108.79	172	174	176	1st place, gold medalist(s)	205	212	~~225~~	1st place, gold medalist(s)	388
2nd place, silver medalist(s)	Hristo Hristov (BUL)	A	109.00	170	173	175	2nd place, silver medalist(s)	202	205	~~208~~	4	380
3rd place, bronze medalist(s)	Matthäus Hofmann (GER)	A	105.09	167	~~169~~	172	3rd place, bronze medalist(s)	197	202	206	3rd place, bronze medalist(s)	378
4	Onur Demirci (TUR)	A	109.00	161	~~166~~	168	6	~~200~~	200	207	2nd place, silver medalist(s)	375
5	Zaza Lomtadze (GEO)	A	108.64	160	164	167	7	203	~~212~~	~~212~~	5	370
6	Tudor Ciobanu (MDA)	A	106.05	160	165	168	5	190	~~200~~	201	7	369
7	Mykyta Rubanovskyi (UKR)	A	108.86	160	164	~~167~~	9	201	~~206~~	~~208~~	6	365
8	Muhammed Emin Burun (TUR)	A	107.67	~~161~~	161	166	8	191	~~198~~	~~200~~	11	357
9	Sargis Martirosjan (AUT)	A	109.00	165	168	171	4	~~181~~	185	~~191~~	13	356
10	Vladyslav Prylypko (UKR)	A	109.00	153	156	159	11	197	~~203~~	~~203~~	10	356
11	Paul Ioniţă (ROU)	B	108.74	152	~~157~~	158	12	~~190~~	190	197	9	355
12	Joen Vikingsson Sjöblom (SWE)	B	105.77	154	158	161	10	188	~~194~~	~~197~~	12	349
13	Hannes Keskitalo (FIN)	B	109.00	137	144	~~150~~	17	193	198	~~202~~	8	342
14	António Vital e Silva (POR)	B	108.02	150	~~158~~	~~159~~	13	~~175~~	~~178~~	178	16	328
15	Arnošt Vogel (CZE)	B	105.42	~~180~~	180	~~187~~	15	~~180~~	180	~~187~~	15	328
16	Albert Meta (ALB)	B	107.70	147	~~152~~	~~152~~	15	~~178~~	178	181	14	328
17	Franko Ferra (ALB)	B	108.42	~~145~~	145	~~150~~	16	~~170~~	170	~~175~~	17	315
18	Jure Škedelj (SLO)	B	108.27	135	~~140~~	~~140~~	18	165	~~170~~	170	18	305
—	Mak Numić (BIH)	B	108.95	~~120~~	~~126~~	~~126~~	—	145	152	~~160~~	19	—
—	Petros Petrosyan (ARM)	A	108.79	~~165~~	—	—	—	—	—	—	—	—

=== Men's +109 kg ===
Rank	Athlete	Group	Body weight	Snatch (kg)				Clean & Jerk (kg)				Total
Rank	Athlete	Group	Body weight	1	2	3	Rank	1	2	3	Rank	Total
1st place, gold medalist(s)	Varazdat Lalayan (ARM)	A	152.50	200	205	~~210~~	1st place, gold medalist(s)	240	250	—	1st place, gold medalist(s)	455
2nd place, silver medalist(s)	Simon Martirosyan (ARM)	A	130.20	190	~~200~~	~~200~~	3rd place, bronze medalist(s)	241	247	~~255~~	2nd place, silver medalist(s)	437
3rd place, bronze medalist(s)	Eduard Ziaziulin (AIN)	A	146.80	195	~~200~~	~~200~~	2nd place, silver medalist(s)	235	~~240~~	241	3rd place, bronze medalist(s)	436
4	Mart Seim (EST)	A	153.10	180	185	~~188~~	4	225	~~237~~	—	4	410
5	Bakari Turmanidze (GEO)	A	168.30	175	~~181~~	~~183~~	6	215	—	—	6	390
6	Oleh Hanzenko (UKR)	A	162.00	170	174	~~179~~	7	210	216	~~220~~	5	390
7	David Litvinov (ISR)	B	135.05	160	165	169	8	200	~~205~~	206	8	375
8	Péter Nagy (HUN)	B	161.60	160	~~165~~	167	10	201	207	~~212~~	7	374
9	Enzo Kuworge (NED)	B	169.20	160	165	168	9	202	—	—	10	370
10	Ioannis Athanasiou (GRE)	B	153.80	161	166	~~169~~	11	200	204	~~206~~	9	370
11	Ragnar Holme (NOR)	B	137.40	155	160	~~165~~	12	185	195	—	11	355
12	Vladimír Macura (SVK)	B	144.90	154	158	~~162~~	14	~~182~~	182	189	12	347
13	Hanno Keskitalo (FIN)	B	144.00	155	160	~~163~~	13	180	186	~~190~~	13	346
14	Križan Rajič (CRO)	B	137.70	140	~~146~~	~~146~~	15	170	~~180~~	~~180~~	14	310
—	Kamil Kučera (CZE)	A	157.00	175	~~180~~	~~182~~	5	~~221~~	~~221~~	~~225~~	—	—
—	Anthony Coullet (FRA)	A	153.80	~~162~~	~~167~~	~~167~~	—	—	—	—	—	—
—	Lasha Talakhadze (GEO)	A	176.00	—	—	—	—	—	—	—	—	—
—	Tamaš Kajdoči (SRB)	B	139.20	—	—	—	—	—	—	—	—	—
—	Caine Wilkes (USA)	A	157.30	~~170~~	170	176	—	207	214	~~220~~	—	390
—	Alejandro Medina (USA)	A	120.10	~~165~~	~~167~~	167	—	~~200~~	~~200~~	~~205~~	—	—

== Women's results ==
=== Women's 45 kg ===
Rank	Athlete	Group	Body weight	Snatch (kg)				Clean & Jerk (kg)				Total
Rank	Athlete	Group	Body weight	1	2	3	Rank	1	2	3	Rank	Total
1st place, gold medalist(s)	Cansu Bektaş (TUR)	A	45.00	70	73	75	1st place, gold medalist(s)	88	~~91~~	~~93~~	2nd place, silver medalist(s)	163
2nd place, silver medalist(s)	Gamze Altun (TUR)	A	45.00	65	~~68~~	~~68~~	5	~~90~~	90	92	1st place, gold medalist(s)	157
3rd place, bronze medalist(s)	Marta García (ESP)	A	44.94	~~69~~	70	72	2nd place, silver medalist(s)	82	84	~~87~~	4	156
4	Ioana Miron (ROU)	A	44.63	61	65	~~68~~	6	78	81	85	3rd place, bronze medalist(s)	150
5	Nadezhda Nguen (BUL)	A	45.00	67	69	~~71~~	3rd place, bronze medalist(s)	~~80~~	80	~~86~~	7	149
6	Kateryna Malashchuk (UKR)	A	44.99	65	67	~~69~~	4	75	~~78~~	~~78~~	6	142
7	Tetiana Budnikova (UKR)	A	45.00	57	59	~~61~~	10	76	78	81	5	140
8	Sonja Koponen (FIN)	B	45.00	~~60~~	60	63	8	72	~~76~~	~~76~~	8	139
9	Bianca Dumitrescu (ROU)	A	44.95	60	64	~~68~~	7	75	~~80~~	~~82~~	10	139
10	Ecaterina Grabucea (MDA)	B	43.88	57	59	~~60~~	9	70	73	~~75~~	11	132
11	Nazila Ismayilova (AZE)	B	45.00	55	58	~~60~~	11	70	~~74~~	—	12	128
12	Gabriela Danilov (MDA)	B	44.90	57	~~59~~	~~60~~	12	66	~~69~~	~~70~~	13	123
—	Boyana Kostadinova (BUL)	A	45.00	~~65~~	~~66~~	~~66~~	—	77	80	~~83~~	6	—

=== Women's 49 kg ===
Rank	Athlete	Group	Body weight	Snatch (kg)				Clean & Jerk (kg)				Total
Rank	Athlete	Group	Body weight	1	2	3	Rank	1	2	3	Rank	Total
1st place, gold medalist(s)	Mihaela Cambei (ROU)	A	48.92	85	90	~~93~~	1st place, gold medalist(s)	100	105	109	1st place, gold medalist(s)	199
2nd place, silver medalist(s)	Oliwia Drzazga (POL)	A	48.82	70	72	74	5	93	~~95~~	96	2nd place, silver medalist(s)	170
3rd place, bronze medalist(s)	Tham Nguyen (IRL)	A	49.00	~~74~~	~~74~~	74	6	~~95~~	95	~~97~~	3rd place, bronze medalist(s)	169
4	Sira Armengou (ESP)	A	47.97	71	74	~~76~~	3rd place, bronze medalist(s)	90	~~94~~	~~94~~	6	164
5	Yuliia Kovalova (UKR)	A	49.00	70	~~73~~	~~73~~	9	89	93	~~95~~	4	163
6	Mara Strzykala (LUX)	B	48.88	66	~~69~~	~~69~~	14	85	89	92	5	158
7	Radmila Zagorac (SRB)	A	48.82	70	~~74~~	~~76~~	8	88	~~94~~	~~94~~	8	158
8	María Giménez-Guervos (ESP)	A	49.00	70	~~73~~	~~73~~	7	86	—	—	9	156
9	Maria Stratoudaki (GRE)	A	48.89	~~67~~	67	~~71~~	13	88	~~91~~	~~91~~	7	155
10	Adriana Pana (ROU)	A	48.77	~~67~~	67	~~71~~	12	83	86	~~89~~	10	153
11	Rebecca Copeland (IRL)	B	48.52	64	67	~~69~~	10	79	~~81~~	~~83~~	12	146
12	Ivana Petrova (BUL)	B	47.27	60	63	65	15	75	~~80~~	~~80~~	11	140
13	Alina Popescu (MDA)	B	48.96	64	~~67~~	~~67~~	11	75	~~80~~	~~80~~	15	139
14	Reni Ruseva (BUL)	B	47.56	~~60~~	60	~~64~~	16	75	~~80~~	~~81~~	14	135
15	Tihana Majer (CRO)	B	48.62	55	~~59~~	~~59~~	17	75	78	~~81~~	13	133
—	Duygu Alıcı (TUR)	A	48.99	75	~~78~~	78	2nd place, silver medalist(s)	~~95~~	~~95~~	~~95~~	—	—
—	Medine Bilicier (TUR)	A	49.00	~~74~~	74	~~77~~	4	~~93~~	~~93~~	~~95~~	—	—
—	Giulia Imperio (ITA)	A	49.00	~~83~~	~~83~~	~~83~~	—	—	—	—	—	—

=== Women's 55 kg ===
Rank	Athlete	Group	Body weight	Snatch (kg)				Clean & Jerk (kg)				Total
Rank	Athlete	Group	Body weight	1	2	3	Rank	1	2	3	Rank	Total
1st place, gold medalist(s)	Aleksandra Grigoryan (ARM)	A	54.85	81	~~84~~	~~84~~	7	105	111	115	1st place, gold medalist(s)	196
2nd place, silver medalist(s)	Celine Ludovica Delia (ITA)	A	55.00	~~83~~	84	~~86~~	4	~~105~~	107	111	2nd place, silver medalist(s)	195
3rd place, bronze medalist(s)	Sol Anette Waaler (NOR)	A	54.63	~~84~~	84	86	1st place, gold medalist(s)	~~104~~	104	~~106~~	5	190
4	Burcu Alıcı (TUR)	A	54.90	80	84	85	3rd place, bronze medalist(s)	101	105	~~107~~	3rd place, bronze medalist(s)	190
5	Alba Sánchez (ESP)	A	55.00	81	~~84~~	84	5	104	~~106~~	~~107~~	4	188
6	Yulia Hulina (AIN)	A	54.99	80	83	85	2nd place, silver medalist(s)	~~98~~	98	~~102~~	9	183
7	Izabella Yaylyan (ARM)	A	55.00	80	~~85~~	~~85~~	8	95	100	~~105~~	7	180
8	Rebekka Tao Jacobsen (NOR)	A	55.00	75	78	~~80~~	11	102	~~105~~	~~107~~	6	180
9	Annelien Vandenabeele (BEL)	A	54.76	77	~~80~~	80	9	~~93~~	94	97	10	177
10	Scheila Meister (SUI)	A	55.00	~~79~~	79	~~82~~	10	98	~~102~~	~~102~~	8	177
11	Marlous Schuilwerve (NED)	A	54.92	78	~~81~~	82	6	94	~~97~~	~~99~~	13	176
12	Nicoleta Cojocaru (MDA)	B	54.57	72	77	~~80~~	12	92	95	~~98~~	11	172
13	Cintia Árva (HUN)	B	54.42	70	~~73~~	~~73~~	13	92	94	~~97~~	12	164
14	Aistė Anciukevičė (LTU)	B	54.47	~~60~~	60	62	15	81	84	~~87~~	14	146
15	Kateřina Weinfurtová (CZE)	B	54.97	~~63~~	~~63~~	63	14	74	~~78~~	~~82~~	15	137

=== Women's 59 kg ===
Rank	Athlete	Group	Body weight	Snatch (kg)				Clean & Jerk (kg)				Total
Rank	Athlete	Group	Body weight	1	2	3	Rank	1	2	3	Rank	Total
1st place, gold medalist(s)	Kamila Konotop (UKR)	A	59.00	102	105	~~108~~	1st place, gold medalist(s)	121	125	–	1st place, gold medalist(s)	230
2nd place, silver medalist(s)	Dora Tchakounté (FRA)	A	58.80	~~95~~	95	98	3rd place, bronze medalist(s)	~~117~~	117	~~120~~	4	215
3rd place, bronze medalist(s)	Saara Retulainen (FIN)	A	59.00	92	~~95~~	95	4	114	117	119	2nd place, silver medalist(s)	214
4	Andreea Cotruţa (ROU)	A	57.75	90	94	~~97~~	5	114	~~118~~	118	3rd place, bronze medalist(s)	212
5	Alina Shchapanava (AIN)	A	58.74	~~92~~	~~92~~	92	7	110	~~115~~	~~115~~	8	202
6	Sofia Georgopoulou (GRE)	A	58.98	87	90	~~93~~	9	109	112	~~115~~	5	202
7	Jessica Gordon Brown (GBR)	B	58.96	87	90	~~83~~	8	107	110	~~113~~	6	200
8	Monika Szymanek (POL)	B	58.98	78	82	85	12	105	~~110~~	110	7	195
9	Maria Połka (POL)	B	59.00	82	84	86	11	102	105	108	9	194
10	Marinela Moroşan (ROU)	A	58.96	85	~~88~~	~~88~~	13	~~103~~	103	105	10	190
11	Maria Kardara (GRE)	B	59.00	83	85	87	10	98	102	~~105~~	14	189
12	Hannah Crymble (IRL)	B	58.68	81	84	~~87~~	14	101	~~104~~	104	13	188
13	Amalie Løvind Årsten (DEN)	B	58.88	~~79~~	79	82	16	101	104	~~108~~	11	186
14	Þuríður Helgadóttir (ISL)	B	59.00	78	~~82~~	~~82~~	17	98	101	104	12	182
15	Irene Martínez (ESP)	B	58.93	83	~~86~~	~~86~~	15	94	~~99~~	~~99~~	15	177
16	Eliška Malcharcziková (CZE)	B	58.66	73	~~76~~	77	19	89	92	~~95~~	17	169
17	Nathalie Lebbe (BEL)	B	59.00	~~75~~	75	~~78~~	21	93	~~96~~	~~97~~	16	168
18	Ivana Gorišek (CRO)	B	58.82	~~74~~	74	77	18	86	90	~~92~~	19	167
19	Rita Gomez (POR)	B	58.63	75	~~80~~	~~80~~	20	~~90~~	90	~~95~~	20	165
20	Deanna Sweeney (IRL)	B	58.96	66	~~68~~	~~68~~	22	88	91	~~93~~	18	157
—	Nina Sterckx (BEL)	A	58.89	98	101	~~103~~	2nd place, silver medalist(s)	~~117~~	~~118~~	~~122~~	—	—
—	Garance Rigaud (FRA)	A	58.30	93	~~96~~	~~96~~	6	~~115~~	~~120~~	~~124~~	—	—
—	Zoe Smith (GBR)	A	58.69	~~84~~	—	—	—	–	—	—	—	—
—	Lucrezia Magistris (ITA)	A	59.00	~~99~~	~~99~~	~~100~~	—	—	—	—	—	—
—	Taylor Wilkins (USA)	A	59.00	92	96	99	—	~~120~~	~~124~~	~~124~~	—	—

=== Women's 64 kg ===
Rank	Athlete	Group	Body weight	Snatch (kg)				Clean & Jerk (kg)				Total
Rank	Athlete	Group	Body weight	1	2	3	Rank	1	2	3	Rank	Total
1st place, gold medalist(s)	Hanna Davydova (UKR)	A	64.00	~~98~~	98	100	2nd place, silver medalist(s)	117	120	~~122~~	2nd place, silver medalist(s)	220
2nd place, silver medalist(s)	Svitlana Samuliak (UKR)	A	61.46	97	99	101	1st place, gold medalist(s)	115	118	~~120~~	3rd place, bronze medalist(s)	219
3rd place, bronze medalist(s)	Wiktoria Wołk (POL)	A	63.23	~~93~~	~~94~~	94	6	115	118	121	1st place, gold medalist(s)	215
4	Aysel Özkan (TUR)	A	63.94	95	~~98~~	98	3rd place, bronze medalist(s)	112	116	~~119~~	4	214
5	Galya Shatova (BUL)	A	63.03	92	94	96	5	115	~~119~~	~~119~~	5	211
6	Dziyana Maiseyevich (AIN)	A	63.97	93	95	97	4	112	~~116~~	~~116~~	9	209
7	Laurène Fauvel (FRA)	A	63.82	90	~~93~~	93	8	110	~~113~~	~~113~~	11	203
8	Patricie Ježková (CZE)	A	63.98	89	93	~~96~~	7	110	~~113~~	~~113~~	12	203
9	Tamara Arunović (SRB)	A	63.68	89	~~91~~	~~92~~	11	107	110	113	7	202
10	Sabine Kusterer (GER)	A	63.77	~~86~~	86	89	12	107	111	113	8	202
11	Garoa Martínez (ESP)	B	63.94	87	~~91~~	~~91~~	14	110	114	~~117~~	6	201
12	Ine Andersson (NOR)	A	61.07	89	~~91~~	~~91~~	10	112	~~115~~	~~116~~	10	201
13	Marit Årdalsbakke (NOR)	B	64.00	89	92	~~94~~	9	105	~~108~~	108	14	200
14	Paula Zikowsky (AUT)	B	63.48	85	~~88~~	88	13	~~103~~	103	~~106~~	17	191
15	Sonja Bjelić (SRB)	A	63.58	~~85~~	86	~~90~~	16	100	104	~~107~~	15	190
16	Lucia Kršková (SVK)	B	63.80	80	84	87	15	98	101	~~103~~	19	188
17	Myrthe Timmermans (NED)	B	63.91	84	~~87~~	~~88~~	18	103	~~106~~	~~106~~	16	187
18	Josephine Rehl (DEN)	B	63.96	~~77~~	77	~~80~~	27	100	104	108	13	185
19	Mafalda Monteiro (POR)	B	64.00	75	81	84	20	100	~~103~~	~~103~~	21	184
20	Moa Henriksson (SWE)	B	61.85	80	~~83~~	83	21	~~100~~	100	~~103~~	22	183
21	Alina Novak (AUT)	B	64.00	80	~~83~~	~~83~~	22	100	~~103~~	103	18	183
22	Katla Björk Ketilsdóttir (ISL)	C	62.92	78	81	84	17	94	~~97~~	97	25	181
23	Kristy Perissinotto (BEL)	C	63.52	~~78~~	~~78~~	78	25	93	~~98~~	100	20	178
24	Gillian Barry (IRL)	C	63.67	74	76	78	24	92	95	97	24	175
25	Aibhe Mulvihill (IRL)	C	63.60	75	78	~~81~~	23	90	93	96	26	174
26	Eva Stassijns (BEL)	C	63.52	74	77	~~79~~	26	95	97	~~99~~	23	174
27	Barbara Maljković (CRO)	C	63.12	~~65~~	~~65~~	66	28	88	92	~~95~~	27	158
—	Tanja Schmid (SUI)	B	63.88	~~84~~	84	~~88~~	19	~~106~~	~~106~~	~~106~~	—	—

=== Women's 71 kg ===
Rank	Athlete	Group	Body weight	Snatch (kg)				Clean & Jerk (kg)				Total
Rank	Athlete	Group	Body weight	1	2	3	Rank	1	2	3	Rank	Total
1st place, gold medalist(s)	Loredana Toma (ROU)	A	68.96	106	109	114	1st place, gold medalist(s)	127	~~131~~	~~131~~	4	241
2nd place, silver medalist(s)	Siuzanna Valodzka (AIN)	A	70.95	101	105	~~107~~	3rd place, bronze medalist(s)	127	130	~~137~~	1st place, gold medalist(s)	235
3rd place, bronze medalist(s)	Lisa Schweizer (GER)	A	70.83	101	105	107	2nd place, silver medalist(s)	~~120~~	120	124	6	231
4	Eygló Fanndal Sturludóttir (ISL)	A	71.00	99	102	105	4	125	~~129~~	~~129~~	5	230
5	Celia Gold (ISR)	A	70.50	98	~~101~~	~~101~~	8	124	~~128~~	128	2nd place, silver medalist(s)	226
6	Sarah Davies (GBR)	A	71.00	98	~~101~~	~~101~~	7	~~127~~	~~128~~	128	3rd place, bronze medalist(s)	226
7	Janette Ylisoini (FIN)	A	70.88	101	~~104~~	~~104~~	5	120	123	~~126~~	8	224
8	Daniela Gherman (SWE)	B	68.43	95	~~99~~	100	6	115	120	~~122~~	9	220
9	Erin Barton (GBR)	B	71.00	94	~~97~~	~~97~~	9	123	~~127~~	~~127~~	7	217
10	Vicky Graillot (FRA)	B	67.80	90	93	~~95~~	12	116	120	~~125~~	10	213
11	Line Gude (DEN)	B	70.37	85	89	92	13	110	115	120	11	212
12	Olha Ivzhenko (UKR)	B	65.61	~~94~~	94	~~99~~	10	116	~~120~~	~~120~~	12	210
13	Lijana Jakaitė (LTU)	B	70.80	93	~~95~~	~~95~~	11	112	~~115~~	115	14	208
14	Tinna Ringsaker (NOR)	C	70.74	84	87	~~90~~	15	109	113	115	13	202
15	Julia Loen (NOR)	B	70.38	~~84~~	~~85~~	85	19	104	107	110	15	195
16	Lili Szalai (HUN)	B	68.63	~~85~~	85	~~90~~	18	105	108	~~111~~	17	193
17	Natália Hušťavová (SVK)	C	66.81	80	83	~~85~~	20	103	107	109	16	192
18	Jannike Bäckström (FIN)	C	68.96	82	85	87	16	101	104	~~108~~	18	191
19	Sandra Sørensen (DEN)	C	67.19	83	~~86~~	86	17	98	~~102~~	~~103~~	20	184
20	Adéla Rybová (CZE)	C	67.04	72	75	~~76~~	21	89	94	97	21	172
21	Maria Arnaudova (BUL)	C	67.39	68	72	75	22	85	90	95	22	170
—	Despoina Polaktsidou (GRE)	B	70.79	86	90	~~92~~	14	~~104~~	~~104~~	~~106~~	—	—
—	Veronika Volná (CZE)	C	65.47	~~75~~	~~75~~	~~76~~	—	99	~~104~~	104	19	—
—	Olivia Reeves (USA)	A	70.80	110	~~114~~	115	—	140	~~145~~	~~148~~	—	255
—	Meredith Alwine (USA)	A	70.93	98	~~101~~	~~103~~	—	127	132	135	—	233

=== Women's 76 kg ===
Rank	Athlete	Group	Body weight	Snatch (kg)				Clean & Jerk (kg)				Total
Rank	Athlete	Group	Body weight	1	2	3	Rank	1	2	3	Rank	Total
1st place, gold medalist(s)	Genna Toko Kegne (ITA)	A	75.33	98	101	~~103~~	1st place, gold medalist(s)	120	126	~~131~~	1st place, gold medalist(s)	227
2nd place, silver medalist(s)	Nicole Rubanovich (ISR)	A	74.43	96	99	~~102~~	3rd place, bronze medalist(s)	~~116~~	117	—	2nd place, silver medalist(s)	216
3rd place, bronze medalist(s)	Lara Dancz (GER)	A	75.31	97	~~100~~	101	2nd place, silver medalist(s)	111	114	~~116~~	6	215
4	Palina Pahuliayeva (AIN)	A	73.99	~~94~~	94	97	5	~~115~~	115	~~119~~	5	212
5	Nadia Oualit (ESP)	A	75.57	94	98	~~101~~	4	113	~~116~~	~~117~~	7	211
6	Laura Horváth (HUN)	A	75.82	90	~~94~~	~~94~~	7	~~115~~	115	~~119~~	4	205
7	Laura Vest Tolstrup (DEN)	A	73.98	~~88~~	89	~~92~~	8	~~116~~	116	~~119~~	3rd place, bronze medalist(s)	205
8	Emma Gleisner (FIN)	A	75.90	~~85~~	85	88	9	108	111	~~114~~	8	199
9	Nina Rondziková (SVK)	A	71.49	83	86	88	10	104	108	111	9	199
10	Guðný Björk Stefánsdóttir (ISL)	B	71.55	85	~~90~~	~~92~~	12	104	107	110	10	195
11	Ivona Gavran (CRO)	A	74.91	86	90	92	11	102	107	110	12	188
12	Sofia Garcia Stefanova (BUL)	B	75.98	~~70~~	71	75	13	90	96	102	11	177
13	Paula Mroz (BEL)	B	73.84	71	~~74~~	~~74~~	14	~~90~~	90	~~94~~	13	161
—	Alexandrina Ciubotaru (MDA)	A	75.60	91	94	~~96~~	6	~~115~~	~~115~~	~~115~~	—	—
—	Marie Fegue (FRA)	B	74.85	—	—	—	—	—	—	—	—	—

=== Women's 81 kg ===
Rank	Athlete	Group	Body weight	Snatch (kg)				Clean & Jerk (kg)				Total
Rank	Athlete	Group	Body weight	1	2	3	Rank	1	2	3	Rank	Total
1st place, gold medalist(s)	Weronika Zielińska-Stubińska (POL)	A	79.61	~~103~~	103	~~106~~	1st place, gold medalist(s)	127	~~130~~	132	1st place, gold medalist(s)	235
2nd place, silver medalist(s)	Elena Erighina (MDA)	A	80.76	~~99~~	99	103	2nd place, silver medalist(s)	126	129	131	2nd place, silver medalist(s)	234
3rd place, bronze medalist(s)	Dilara Narin (TUR)	A	81.00	~~95~~	97	~~101~~	4	125	~~128~~	~~128~~	3rd place, bronze medalist(s)	222
4	Liana Gyurjyan (ARM)	A	81.00	95	~~98~~	~~98~~	6	~~125~~	125	~~129~~	4	220
5	Darya Kheidzer (AIN)	A	80.79	93	~~96~~	96	5	112	116	~~120~~	5	212
6	Anastasia Cîlcic (MDA)	A	80.77	80	84	~~87~~	8	100	~~105~~	109	6	193
7	Simona Jeřábková (CZE)	A	76.48	~~84~~	84	87	7	105	~~109~~	~~110~~	7	192
—	Ilke Lagrou (BEL)	A	80.43	97	100	103	3rd place, bronze medalist(s)	~~123~~	~~125~~	~~125~~	—	—
—	Nikki Löwik (NED)	A	80.57	~~102~~	~~103~~	~~104~~	—	~~125~~	—	—	—	—
—	Katrina Feklistova (GBR)	A	79.82	—	—	—	—	—	—	—	—	—
—	Katherine Vibert (USA)	A	76.89	~~110~~	~~110~~	~~110~~	—	~~140~~	~~140~~	—	—	—
—	Mattie Rogers (USA)	A	78.11	—	—	—	—	—	—	—	—	—

=== Women's 87 kg ===
Rank	Athlete	Group	Body weight	Snatch (kg)				Clean & Jerk (kg)				Total
Rank	Athlete	Group	Body weight	1	2	3	Rank	1	2	3	Rank	Total
1st place, gold medalist(s)	Solfrid Koanda (NOR)	A	85.62	114	~~118~~	120	1st place, gold medalist(s)	148	155	160	1st place, gold medalist(s)	280
2nd place, silver medalist(s)	Anastasiia Manievska (UKR)	A	84.75	102	~~105~~	~~106~~	6	126	128	—	2nd place, silver medalist(s)	230
3rd place, bronze medalist(s)	Hripsime Khurshudyan (ARM)	A	86.80	102	~~105~~	105	3rd place, bronze medalist(s)	~~122~~	122	~~125~~	5	227
4	Tatev Hakobyan (ARM)	A	86.95	103	~~106~~	~~106~~	5	124	~~126~~	~~127~~	4	227
5	Büşra Çan (TUR)	A	86.83	97	100	~~103~~	8	123	~~127~~	127	3rd place, bronze medalist(s)	227
6	Anne Vejsgaard Jensen (DEN)	A	86.72	99	103	107	2nd place, silver medalist(s)	115	~~119~~	119	9	226
7	Nina Schroth (GER)	A	86.35	~~100~~	100	104	4	118	~~122~~	~~123~~	10	222
8	Veronika Mitykó (HUN)	A	83.05	~~101~~	~~101~~	102	7	112	116	118	12	220
9	Eliise Peterson (EST)	A	85.68	~~100~~	100	~~104~~	9	120	~~123~~	~~124~~	8	220
10	Mariam Murgvliani (GEO)	A	85.39	97	~~101~~	~~101~~	10	116	~~121~~	121	7	218
11	Alexandra Alexe (ROU)	A	83.65	95	~~99~~	~~99~~	12	118	121	~~125~~	6	216
12	Nikola Seničová (SVK)	A	84.99	~~96~~	97	~~101~~	11	118	~~124~~	~~124~~	11	215
13	Lenka Žembová (SVK)	B	87.00	~~91~~	91	94	13	110	~~114~~	115	13	209
14	Eliška Šmigová (CZE)	B	83.78	87	~~90~~	~~91~~	15	110	114	~~117~~	14	201
15	Friðný Fjóla Jónsdóttir (ISL)	B	81.82	88	~~92~~	~~93~~	14	~~105~~	106	~~112~~	15	194
16	Despoina Charitopoulou (GRE)	B	82.58	80	~~85~~	85	16	101	~~106~~	106	16	191
17	Pavlína Šedá (CZE)	B	84.01	79	82	84	17	92	96	100	17	184
18	Abida Ćorić (BIH)	B	81.89	80	~~83~~	~~83~~	18	99	~~103~~	~~103~~	18	179

=== Women's +87 kg ===
Rank	Athlete	Group	Body weight	Snatch (kg)				Clean & Jerk (kg)				Total
Rank	Athlete	Group	Body weight	1	2	3	Rank	1	2	3	Rank	Total
1st place, gold medalist(s)	Emily Campbell (GBR)	A	129.80	112	~~116~~	~~116~~	2nd place, silver medalist(s)	146	151	—	1st place, gold medalist(s)	263
2nd place, silver medalist(s)	Anastasiia Hotfrid (GEO)	A	100.13	111	115	117	1st place, gold medalist(s)	128	133	140	2nd place, silver medalist(s)	257
3rd place, bronze medalist(s)	Fatmagül Çevik (TUR)	A	109.68	~~103~~	103	107	4	125	129	131	3rd place, bronze medalist(s)	238
4	Valentyna Kisil (UKR)	A	100.76	104	106	108	3rd place, bronze medalist(s)	126	~~129~~	~~130~~	5	234
5	Sarah Fischer (AUT)	A	96.22	97	101	~~105~~	6	125	130	~~132~~	4	231
6	Krystyna Borodina (UKR)	A	96.43	98	100	102	5	125	~~130~~	~~131~~	6	227
7	Dzhesika Ivanova (BUL)	A	102.36	94	98	100	8	116	125	~~128~~	7	225
8	Erla Ágústsdóttir (ISL)	B	116.21	93	97	100	7	110	~~115~~	115	8	215
9	Tereza Králová (CZE)	B	93.07	88	~~92~~	92	9	~~111~~	112	~~118~~	10	204
10	Danique Schepens (NED)	B	100.82	85	~~91~~	~~92~~	10	108	112	~~115~~	9	197
11	Cecily Ellis (NED)	B	104.03	~~75~~	75	~~82~~	11	95	~~100~~	100	11	175
—	Tuana Süren (TUR)	A	96.74	~~103~~	~~103~~	—	—		—	—	—	—
—	Mary Theisen-Lappen (USA)	A	135.12	~~116~~	116	~~121~~	—	145	150	155	—	271

== Team ranking ==
=== Men ===
Rank	Team	Points
1	Bulgaria	696
2	Armenia	669
3	Turkey	628
4	Georgia	535
5	Moldova	485
6	Ukraine	454
7	Azerbaijan	363
8	Czech Republic	304
9	Germany	300
10	Albania	278

=== Women ===
Rank	Team	Points
1	Ukraine	654
2	Turkey	535
3	Romania	485
4	Spain	395
5	Norway	362
6	Bulgaria	344
7	Armenia	327
8	Poland	326
9	Moldova	324
10	Czech Republic	303
