= Genna Toko Kegne =

Italian weightlifter (born 2002)

Personal information
- Born: 10 November 2002 (age 23)

Sport
- Country: Italy
- Sport: Weightlifting
- Weight class: 76 kg
Medal record
Women's weightlifting
Representing Italy
European Championships
Gold medal – first place	2024 Sofia	76 kg
Gold medal – first place	2025 Chișinău	76 kg
Mediterranean Games
Silver medal – second place	2026 Taranto	77 kg S
Silver medal – second place	2026 Taranto	77 kg CJ
European U23 Championships
Gold medal – first place	2025 Durres	77 kg

Genna Romida Toko Kegne (born 10 November 2002) is an Italian weightlifter. She is a two-time gold medalist at the European Weightlifting Championships (2024 and 2025).

She is also a silver medalist at the 2023 European Junior and U23 Weightlifting Championships held in Bucharest, Romania.

== Achievements ==
Year	Venue	Weight	Snatch (kg)				Clean & Jerk (kg)				Total	Rank
Year	Venue	Weight	1	2	3	Rank	1	2	3	Rank	Total	Rank
European Championships
2024	Sofia, Bulgaria	76 kg	98	101	~~103~~	1st place, gold medalist(s)	120	126	~~131~~	1st place, gold medalist(s)	227	1st place, gold medalist(s)
2025	Chișinău, Moldova	76 kg	100	~~104~~	~~104~~	4	125	130	133	1st place, gold medalist(s)	233	1st place, gold medalist(s)
