= Istanbul Gelişim University =

Private university in İstanbul, Turkey

Coordinates: 40°59′42″N 28°41′46″E

- İstanbul Gelişim Üniversitesi
- Type: Foundation
- Established: 2008
- President: Abdülkadir Gayretli
- Rector: Bahri Şahin
- Academic staff: 1,383
- Students: ~ 39,000
- Undergraduates: ~ 28.000
- Postgraduates: ~ 11.000 (including doctoral students)
- Location: Istanbul, Turkey
- Campus: Avcılar
- Language: English, Turkish
- Founder: Gelişim Education, Culture, Health, and Social Service Foundation
- Colors: Blue, White
- Nickname: İGÜ (in Turkish)
- Website: www.gelisim.edu.tr

University rankings

Regional – Overall
- QS Emerging Europe and Central Asia: 301-350 (2022)

Istanbul Gelişim University (Turkish: İstanbul Gelişim Üniversitesi) is a private non-profit university in Istanbul, Turkey. Gelişim Education, Culture, Health, and Social Service Foundation took steps in the direction of establishing a vocational school under the name of "Istanbul Gelişim Vocational School" in 2008.

== Academic units ==
=== Faculties ===
- Faculty of Economics, Administrative and Social Sciences
- Faculty of Fine Arts
- Faculty of Engineering and Architecture
- Faculty of Dentistry

=== Institutes ===
- Institute of Science and Technology
- Institute of Social Sciences
- Institute of Health Sciences

=== Schools ===
- School of Health Sciences
- School of Applied Sciences
- School of Physical Education and Sports
- School of Foreign Languages

=== Vocational Schools ===
- Istanbul Gelişim Vocational School
- Vocational School of Health Services

== Allegations of mass layoffs ==
Istanbul Gelişim University has come to the forefront with allegations of mass layoffs in the 2024-2025 and 2025-2026 academic years. It is claimed that the reason for the layoffs is the low number of applicants and "downsizing". The university has not made an official statement.
