= 2025 World Weightlifting Championships – Men's 65 kg =

Men's 65 kg at the 2025 World Weightlifting Championships
- Venue: Førdehuset
- Location: Førde, Norway
- Dates: 4 October
- Competitors: 18 from 16 nations
- Winning total: 324 kg CWR

Medalists
gold medal	Muhammed Furkan Özbek	Turkey
silver medal	Pak Myong-jin	North Korea
bronze medal	Hampton Morris	United States

The men's 65 kilograms competition at the 2025 World Weightlifting Championships was held on 4 October 2025.

== Schedule ==
Date	Time	Event
4 October 2025	12:30	Group B
4 October 2025	17:00	Group A

== Records ==
Prior to this competition, the existing world records were as follows.

World record	Snatch	World Standard	148 kg	—	1 June 2025
World record	Clean & Jerk	Hampton Morris (USA)	181 kg	Cali, Colombia	14 July 2025
World record	Total	World Standard	322 kg	—	1 June 2025

== Results ==
Rank	Athlete	Group	Snatch (kg)				Clean & Jerk (kg)				Total
Rank	Athlete	Group	1	2	3	Rank	1	2	3	Rank	Total
1st place, gold medalist(s)	Muhammed Furkan Özbek (TUR)	A	140	143	145; ER	1st place, gold medalist(s)	173	176	179; ER	2nd place, silver medalist(s)	324 CWR
2nd place, silver medalist(s)	Pak Myong-jin (PRK)	A	135	~~139~~	~~139~~	5	175	~~179~~	180	1st place, gold medalist(s)	315
3rd place, bronze medalist(s)	Hampton Morris (USA)	A	~~131~~	133	~~139~~	9	178	~~183~~	~~183~~	3rd place, bronze medalist(s)	311
4	Francisco Mosquera (COL)	A	130	~~134~~	~~135~~	11	170	175	~~179~~	4	305
5	Aznil Bidin (MAS)	A	130	135	~~139~~	6	166	~~171~~	~~171~~	6	301
6	Ivan Dimov (BUL)	B	133	137	~~141~~	2nd place, silver medalist(s)	156	~~163~~	163	8	300
7	Eko Yuli Irawan (INA)	A	~~135~~	~~136~~	137	3rd place, bronze medalist(s)	163	~~166~~	~~167~~	9	300
8	Luis Bardalez (PER)	A	127	131	134	7	165	~~168~~	~~168~~	7	299
9	Muthupandi Raja (IND)	A	~~130~~	130	~~134~~	12	163	~~167~~	169	5	299
10	Geovani Adventino (INA)	A	133	~~138~~	~~138~~	8	162	~~168~~	~~168~~	10	295
11	Yuki Kimura (JPN)	B	~~131~~	131	~~134~~	10	153	~~157~~	~~157~~	12	284
12	Jon Luke Mau (GER)	B	125	129	~~133~~	13	155	~~160~~	~~160~~	11	284
13	Gabriel Marinov (BUL)	B	120	~~125~~	125	14	150	~~155~~	~~160~~	14	275
14	Dimitris Minasidis (CYP)	B	117	122	~~126~~	16	143	147	151	13	273
15	Kao Chan-hung (TPE)	B	120	123	~~125~~	15	148	~~152~~	~~152~~	15	271
16	Pavlo Zalipskyi (UKR)	B	118	~~122~~	~~125~~	17	~~147~~	147	~~152~~	16	265
17	Leowell Cristobal (NMI)	B	101	105	108	18	140	145	~~149~~	17	253
—	Ferdi Hardal (TUR)	A	135	~~138~~	~~138~~	4	~~165~~	~~166~~	~~167~~	—	—
