= List of South African records in Olympic weightlifting =

The following are the national records in Olympic weightlifting in South Africa. Records are maintained in each weight class for the snatch lift, clean and jerk lift, and the total for both lifts by the South African Weightlifting Federation.

== Current records ==
=== Men ===
Event	Record	Athlete	Date	Meet	Place	Ref
60 kg
Snatch	110 kg	Standard				
Clean & Jerk	134 kg	Standard				
Total	239 kg	Standard				
65 kg
Snatch	116 kg	Standard				
Clean & Jerk	141 kg	Standard				
Total	253 kg	Standard				
70 kg
Snatch	122 kg	Standard				
Clean & Jerk	148 kg	Standard				
Total	265 kg	Standard				
75 kg
Snatch	127 kg	Standard				
Clean & Jerk	160 kg	Jon-antohein Phillips	3 October 2026	South African Championships	Mossel Bay, South Africa	
Total	282 kg	Jon-antohein Phillips	3 October 2026	South African Championships	Mossel Bay, South Africa	
85 kg
Snatch	150 kg	William Swart	3 October 2026	South African Championships	Mossel Bay, South Africa	
Clean & Jerk	183 kg	William Swart	3 October 2026	South African Championships	Mossel Bay, South Africa	
Total	333 kg	William Swart	3 October 2026	South African Championships	Mossel Bay, South Africa	
95 kg
Snatch	143 kg	Standard				
Clean & Jerk	173 kg	Standard				
Total	309 kg	Standard				
110 kg
Snatch	150 kg	Standard				
Clean & Jerk	181 kg	Standard				
Total	325 kg	Standard				
+110 kg
Snatch	160 kg	Standard				
Clean & Jerk	194 kg	Standard				
Total	349 kg	Standard				

=== Women ===
Event	Record	Athlete	Date	Meet	Place	Ref
49 kg
Snatch	70 kg	Standard				
Clean & Jerk	88 kg	Standard				
Total	157 kg	Standard				
53 kg
Snatch	78 kg	Johanni Taljaard	27 July 2026	Commonwealth Games	Glasgow, United Kingdom	
Clean & Jerk	98 kg	Johanni Taljaard	12 May 2026	African Championships	Ismailia, Egypt	
Total	173 kg (Note: by official result source; 177 kg by federation source, probably a typo)	Johanni Taljaard	12 May 2026	African Championships	Ismailia, Egypt	
Total	175 kg	Johanni Taljaard	27 July 2026	Commonwealth Games	Glasgow, United Kingdom	
57 kg
Snatch	83 kg	Johanni Taljaard	3 October 2026	South African Championships	Mossel Bay, South Africa	
Clean & Jerk	104 kg	Johanni Taljaard	3 October 2026	South African Championships	Mossel Bay, South Africa	
Total	187 kg	Johanni Taljaard	3 October 2026	South African Championships	Mossel Bay, South Africa	
61 kg
Snatch	82 kg	Standard				
Clean & Jerk	104 kg	Standard				
Total	183 kg	Standard				
69 kg
Snatch	92 kg	Laryne Jefferies	3 October 2026	South African Championships	Mossel Bay, South Africa	
Clean & Jerk	112 kg	Laryne Jefferies	28 August 2025			
Total	203 kg	Laryne Jefferies	28 August 2025			
77 kg
Snatch	93 kg	Standard				
Clean & Jerk	118 kg	Standard				
Total	208 kg	Standard				
86 kg
Snatch	98 kg	Standard				
Clean & Jerk	123 kg	Standard				
Total	218 kg	Standard				
+86 kg
Snatch	110 kg	Standard				
Clean & Jerk	138 kg	Standard				
Total	245 kg	Standard				

== Historical records ==
=== Men (2025–2026) ===
Event	Record	Athlete	Date	Meet	Place	Ref
71 kg
Snatch	123 kg	Standard				
Clean & Jerk	150 kg	Jonathan Trumble	26 August 2025			
Total	267 kg	Standard				
79 kg
Snatch	131 kg	Standard				
Clean & Jerk	170 kg	Jon-antohein Phillips	29 November 2025	South African Championships	Germiston, South Africa	
Total	294 kg	Jon-antohein Phillips	14 May 2026	African Championships	Ismailia, Egypt	
88 kg
Snatch	148 kg	William Swart	15 May 2026	African Championships	Ismailia, Egypt	
Clean & Jerk	188 kg	William Swart	15 May 2026	African Championships	Ismailia, Egypt	
Total	336 kg	William Swart	15 May 2026	African Championships	Ismailia, Egypt	
94 kg
Snatch	149 kg	William Swart	21 February 2026			
Clean & Jerk	183 kg	William Swart	21 February 2026			
Total	332 kg	William Swart	21 February 2026			

=== Men (2018–2025) ===
Event	Record	Athlete	Date	Meet	Place	Ref
55 kg
Snatch	96 kg	Standard				
Clean & Jerk	115 kg	Standard				
Total	208 kg	Standard				
61 kg
Snatch	102 kg	Standard				
Clean & Jerk	124 kg	Standard				
Total	225 kg	Standard				
67 kg
Snatch	111 kg	Zach Snyman	13 July 2023			
Clean & Jerk	145 kg	Jon-antohein Phillips	30 November 2019			
Total	255 kg	Jon-antohein Phillips	30 November 2019			
73 kg
Snatch	123 kg	Jon-antohein Phillips	22 October 2022	South African Championships	Mossel Bay, South Africa	
Clean & Jerk	162 kg	Jon-antohein Phillips	31 July 2022	Commonwealth Games	Marston Green, Great Britain	
Total	283 kg	Jon-antohein Phillips	22 October 2022	South African Championships	Mossel Bay, South Africa	
81 kg
Snatch	130 kg	Dinesh Pandoo	16 June 2024	South African Championships	Stellenbosch, South Africa	
Clean & Jerk	168 kg	Jon-antohein Phillips	9 December 2024	World Championships	Manama, Bahrain	
Total	291 kg	Jon-antohein Phillips	9 December 2024	World Championships	Manama, Bahrain	
89 kg
Snatch	139 kg	William Swart	11 December 2024	World Championships	Manama, Bahrain	
Clean & Jerk	180 kg	William Swart	26 April 2025	African Championships	Moka, Mauritius	
Total	318 kg	William Swart	11 December 2024	World Championships	Manama, Bahrain	
96 kg
Snatch	141 kg	Ruben Burger	27 February 2022			
Clean & Jerk	174 kg	William Swart	17 May 2025			
Total	316 kg	William Swart	17 May 2025			
102 kg
Snatch	144 kg	Ruben Burger	23 October 2022	South African Championships	Mossel Bay, South Africa	
Clean & Jerk	175 kg	Ruben Burger	13 September 2023	World Championships	Riyadh, Saudi Arabia	
Total	317 kg	Ruben Burger	23 October 2022	South African Championships	Mossel Bay, South Africa	
109 kg
Snatch	139 kg	Standard				
Clean & Jerk	171 kg	Ruben Burger	29 October 2023	South African Championships	Randburg, South Africa	
Total	309 kg	Standard				
+109 kg
Snatch	176 kg	Gordan Shaw	30 November 2019			
Clean & Jerk	201 kg	Gordan Shaw	30 November 2019			
Total	377 kg	Gordan Shaw	30 November 2019			

=== Women (2025–2026) ===
Event	Record	Athlete	Date	Meet	Place	Ref
48 kg
Snatch	69 kg	Standard				
Clean & Jerk	87 kg	Standard				
Total	154 kg	Standard				
58 kg
Snatch	83 kg	Johanni Taljaard	18 October 2025			
Clean & Jerk	102 kg	Anneke Spies-Burger	28 April 2026			
Total	184 kg	Johanni Taljaard	18 October 2025			
63 kg
Snatch	84 kg	Standard				
Clean & Jerk	105 kg	Standard				
Total	187 kg	Standard				

=== Women (2018–2025) ===
Event	Record	Athlete	Date	Meet	Place	Ref
45 kg
Snatch	60 kg	Standard				
Clean & Jerk	77 kg	Standard				
Total	136 kg	Standard				
49 kg
Snatch	65 kg	Standard				
Clean & Jerk	84 kg	Standard				
Total	148 kg	Standard				
55 kg
Snatch	80 kg	Johanni Taljaard	5 December 2018			
Clean & Jerk	97 kg	Johanni Taljaard	5 December 2018			
Total	177 kg	Johanni Taljaard	5 December 2018			
59 kg
Snatch	87 kg	Johanni Taljaard	27 August 2019	African Games	Rabat, Morocco	
Clean & Jerk	106 kg	Anneke Spies	7 September 2023			
Total	190 kg	Anneke Spies	31 July 2022	Commonwealth Games	Marston Green, United Kingdom	
64 kg
Snatch	87 kg	Johanni Taljaard	12 October 2019			
Clean & Jerk	107 kg	Mona Pretorius	21 September 2019	World Championships	Pattaya, Thailand	
Total	192 kg	Mona Pretorius	27 August 2019	African Games	Rabat, Morocco	
71 kg
Snatch	88 kg	Laryne Jefferies	29 October 2023	South African Championships	Randburg, South Africa	
Clean & Jerk	113 kg	Laryne Jefferies	17 May 2025			
Total	200 kg	Laryne Jefferies	29 October 2023	South African Championships	Randburg, South Africa	
76 kg
Snatch	91 kg	Laryne Jefferies	17 June 2024	South African Championships	Stellenbosch, South Africa	
Clean & Jerk	109 kg	Laryne Jefferies	17 June 2024	South African Championships	Stellenbosch, South Africa	
Total	200 kg	Laryne Jefferies	17 June 2024	South African Championships	Stellenbosch, South Africa	
81 kg
Snatch	89 kg	Standard				
Clean & Jerk	111 kg	Standard				
Total	223 kg	Standard				
87 kg
Snatch	92 kg	Standard				
Clean & Jerk	115 kg	Standard				
Total	233 kg	Standard				
+87 kg
Snatch	102 kg	Standard				
Clean & Jerk	120 kg	Standard				
Total	235 kg	Standard				
