= List of Maltese records in Olympic weightlifting =

The following are the national records in Olympic weightlifting in Malta. Records are maintained in each weight class for the snatch lift, clean and jerk lift, and the total for both lifts by the Malta Weightlifting Association (MWA).

== Current records ==
=== Men ===
Event	Record	Athlete	Date	Meet	Place	Ref
60 kg
Snatch	90 kg	Standard				
Clean & Jerk	108 kg	Standard				
Total	195 kg	Standard				
65 kg
Snatch	95 kg	Standard				
Clean & Jerk	118 kg	Standard				
Total	207 kg	Standard				
70 kg
Snatch	102 kg	Standard				
Clean & Jerk	125 kg	Standard				
Total	226 kg	Standard				
75 kg
Snatch	121 kg	Standard				
Clean & Jerk	153 kg	Standard				
Total	274 kg	Standard				
85 kg
Snatch	130 kg	Standard				
Clean & Jerk	161 kg	Standard				
Total	286 kg	Standard				
95 kg
Snatch	126 kg	Standard				
Clean & Jerk	161 kg	Standard				
Total	285 kg	Standard				
110 kg
Snatch	131 kg	Standard				
Clean & Jerk	157 kg	Standard				
Total	288 kg	Standard				
+110 kg
Snatch	133 kg	Standard				
Clean & Jerk	155 kg	Standard				
Total	285 kg	Standard				

=== Women ===
Event	Record	Athlete	Date	Meet	Place	Ref
49 kg
Snatch	71 kg	Standard				
Clean & Jerk	89 kg	Standard				
Total	159 kg	Standard				
53 kg
Snatch	81 kg	Standard				
Clean & Jerk	100 kg	Standard				
Total	180 kg	Standard				
57 kg
Snatch	84 kg	Standard				
Clean & Jerk	104 kg	Standard				
Total	188 kg	Standard				
61 kg
Snatch	90 kg	Standard				
Clean & Jerk	112 kg	Standard				
Total	201 kg	Standard				
69 kg
Snatch	91 kg	Standard				
Snatch	92 kg	Tenishia Thornton	22 April 2026	European Championships	Batumi, Georgia	
Snatch	93 kg	Tenishia Thornton	28 July 2026	Commonwealth Games	Glasgow, United Kingdom	
Clean & Jerk	114 kg	Standard				
Clean & Jerk	115 kg	Tenishia Thornton	22 April 2026	European Championships	Batumi, Georgia	
Total	205 kg	Standard				
Total	207 kg	Tenishia Thornton	22 April 2026	European Championships	Batumi, Georgia	
77 kg
Snatch	87 kg	Standard				
Clean & Jerk	112 kg	Standard				
Total	199 kg	Standard				
86 kg
Snatch	86 kg	Standard				
Clean & Jerk	106 kg	Standard				
Total	192 kg	Standard				
+86 kg
Snatch	96 kg	Standard				
Clean & Jerk	116 kg	Standard				
Total	209 kg	Standard				
