= 2026 World Weightlifting Championships – Men's 65 kg =

Men's 65 kg at the 2026 World Weightlifting Championships
- Venue: Ningbo Olympic Sports Center
- Location: Ningbo, China
- Dates: 28 October
- Competitors: 36 from 28 nations
- Winning total: 331 kg WR

Medalists
gold medal	Pak Myong-jin	North Korea
silver medal	Muhammed Furkan Özbek	Turkey
bronze medal	Hampton Morris	United States

The men's 65 kilograms competition at the 2026 World Weightlifting Championships was held on 28 October 2026.

== Schedule ==
Date	Time	Event
28 October 2026	11:00	Group D
28 October 2026	13:30	Group C
28 October 2026	16:00	Group B
28 October 2026	19:00	Group A

== Records ==
Prior to this competition, the existing world records were as follows.

World record	Snatch	He Yueji (CHN)	152 kg	Nagoya, Japan	24 September 2026
World record	Clean & Jerk	He Yueji (CHN)	183 kg	Gandhinagar, India	13 May 2026
World record	Total	He Yueji (CHN)	329 kg	Gandhinagar, India	13 May 2026

== Results ==
Rank	Athlete	Group	Snatch (kg)				Clean & Jerk (kg)				Total
Rank	Athlete	Group	1	2	3	Rank	1	2	3	Rank	Total
1st place, gold medalist(s)	Pak Myong-jin (PRK)	A	140	144	~~147~~	4	179	183	187; WR	1st place, gold medalist(s)	331; WR
2nd place, silver medalist(s)	Muhammed Furkan Özbek (TUR)	A	142	145	147	2nd place, silver medalist(s)	175	179	183	3rd place, bronze medalist(s)	330
3rd place, bronze medalist(s)	Hampton Morris (USA)	A	132	137	143	5	180	185	~~189~~	2nd place, silver medalist(s)	328
4	Ding Hongjie (CHN)	A	142	146	~~148~~	3rd place, bronze medalist(s)	174	179	~~183~~	4	325
5	Trần Minh Trí (VIE)	A	~~136~~	136	140	6	168	173	176	5	316
6	He Yueji (CHN)	A	142	~~147~~	148	1st place, gold medalist(s)	167	~~177~~	~~177~~	9	315
7	Ricko Saputra (INA)	B	132	~~135~~	135	7	164	168	171	7	306
8	Francisco Mosquera (COL)	A	133	~~136~~	~~138~~	11	172	~~177~~	~~180~~	6	305
9	Eko Yuli Irawan (INA)	B	133	~~136~~	~~137~~	9	164	168	~~171~~	8	301
10	Nguyễn Thành Duy (VIE)	B	130	~~133~~	~~133~~	14	160	166; WYR	~~170~~	12	296; WYR
11	Kotaro Sato (JPN)	C	126	129	~~132~~	18	166	~~171~~	~~171~~	11	295
12	Wilkeinner Lugo (VEN)	C	126	130	133	8	156	161	~~165~~	14	294
13	Chen Wang-heng (TPE)	B	~~130~~	130	133	10	~~160~~	160	~~165~~	17	293
14	Jonathan Muñoz (MEX)	B	128	~~132~~	~~132~~	19	157	163	~~167~~	13	291
15	Bernardin Matam (FRA)	B	129	132	~~135~~	13	158	~~165~~	~~165~~	19	290
16	Sergio Massidda (ITA)	B	~~130~~	130	~~135~~	16	~~160~~	160	~~165~~	16	290
17	Youn Yeo-won (KOR)	B	128	~~132~~	~~132~~	20	155	161	~~166~~	15	289
18	Garnik Cholakyan (ARM)	B	125	130	~~134~~	15	155	~~161~~	~~161~~	22	285
19	Albert Sharkov (RUS)	C	122	127	132	12	143	150	~~154~~	25	282
20	Herseleid Carrazco (MEX)	C	118	~~122~~	122	25	151	156	158	18	280
21	Orlando Vásquez (NCA)	C	~~124~~	124	~~127~~	22	150	155	~~158~~	20	279
22	Ali Kalitit (KSA)	C	~~124~~	124	~~128~~	23	151	~~156~~	~~156~~	24	275
23	Luis García (DOM)	C	~~120~~	120	123	24	152	~~157~~	~~157~~	23	275
24	Morea Baru (PNG)	C	120	~~123~~	~~123~~	26	150	~~155~~	155	21	275
25	Kao Chan-hung (TPE)	C	115	118	~~120~~	27	140	~~145~~	145	27	263
26	Leowell Cristobal (NMI)	D	110	113	~~116~~	29	~~145~~	145	~~150~~	26	258
27	Jean Ramiarimanana (MAD)	D	110	115	~~120~~	28	135	142	~~146~~	28	257
28	Apakuki Wakanibua (FIJ)	D	~~90~~	90	95	31	120	125	~~130~~	29	220
29	Fahad Al-Otaibi (KUW)	D	91	96	~~100~~	30	120	~~126~~	~~126~~	30	216
30	Mohammad Al-Otaibi (KUW)	D	82	88	92	32	105	110	114	31	206
—	Luis Bardalez (PER)	A	130	~~134~~	~~134~~	17	~~162~~	~~162~~	~~165~~	—	—
—	Thiago Silva (BRA)	A	~~126~~	126	~~130~~	21	~~165~~	~~166~~	~~166~~	—	—
—	Adkhamjon Ergashev (UZB)	A	~~133~~	~~133~~	~~134~~	—	163	167	~~170~~	10	—
—	Ferdi Hardal (TUR)	B	~~128~~	~~130~~	~~130~~	—	~~155~~	~~155~~	~~155~~	—	—
—	Tatsuma Yamashita (JPN)	C	~~129~~	~~129~~	—	—	—	—	—	—	—
—	Ivan Dimov (BUL)	D	—	—	—	—	—	—	—	—	—
—	Charu Pesi (IND)	B	Did not start								
—	Seraj Al-Saleem (KSA)	B	Did not start								
—	Joshua Mboya (KEN)	D	Did not start								
—	Francis Kondeh (SLE)	D	Did not start								
—	Lamin Kamara (SLE)	D	Did not start								
—	Ian Okinyi (KEN)	D	Did not start								
