= Timur Naniev =

Russian weightlifter (born 1994)

Personal information
- Nationality: (Russia) Russian
- Born: 20 September 1994 (age 31) Vladikavkaz, Russia

Sport
- Sport: Weightlifting
Medal record
Men's weightlifting
Representing Individual Neutral Athletes
European Championships
Bronze medal – third place	2026 Batumi	+110 kg
Representing Russia
European Championships
Silver medal – second place	2014 Tel Aviv	–105 kg
Bronze medal – third place	2021 Moscow	–109 kg

Timur Ruslanovich Naniev (Russian: Тимур Русланович Наниев; born 20 September 1994) is a Russian weightlifter. He represented Russia at the 2020 Summer Olympics in Tokyo.
