= 2023 World Weightlifting Championships – Men's 61 kg =

The men's 61 kilograms competition at the 2023 World Weightlifting Championships was held between 4 and 6 September 2023.

== Schedule ==
Date	Time	Event
4 September 2023	21:30	Group D
5 September 2023	11:00	Group C
6 September 2023	11:00	Group B
6 September 2023	16:30	Group A

== Medalists ==
Event	Gold		Silver		Bronze	
Snatch	Li Fabin (CHN)	141 kg	Sergio Massidda (ITA)	137 kg	Shota Mishvelidze (GEO)	136 kg
Clean & Jerk	Hampton Morris (USA)	168 kg	Li Fabin (CHN)	167 kg	Aniq Kasdan (MAS)	166 kg
Total	Li Fabin (CHN)	308 kg	Sergio Massidda (ITA)	302 kg	Ding Hongjie (CHN)	301 kg

== Records ==
Prior to this competition, the existing world records were as follows.

World Record	Snatch	Li Fabin (CHN)	145 kg	Pattaya, Thailand	19 September 2019
World Record	Clean & Jerk	Li Fabin (CHN)	175 kg	Bogotá, Colombia	7 December 2022
World Record	Total	Li Fabin (CHN)	318 kg	Pattaya, Thailand	19 September 2019

== Results ==
Rank	Athlete	Group	Snatch (kg)				Clean & Jerk (kg)				Total
Rank	Athlete	Group	1	2	3	Rank	1	2	3	Rank	Total
1st place, gold medalist(s)	Li Fabin (CHN)	A	137	141	~~146~~	1st place, gold medalist(s)	~~167~~	167	~~169~~	2nd place, silver medalist(s)	308
2nd place, silver medalist(s)	Sergio Massidda (ITA)	A	135	137	~~139~~	2nd place, silver medalist(s)	163	~~165~~	165	7	302
3rd place, bronze medalist(s)	Ding Hongjie (CHN)	B	135	~~139~~	~~139~~	4	166	~~171~~	~~171~~	4	301
4	Shota Mishvelidze (GEO)	A	132	~~136~~	136	3rd place, bronze medalist(s)	156	~~161~~	161	13	297
5	John Ceniza (PHI)	B	128	131	~~133~~	8	~~165~~	165	~~170~~	5	296
6	Ivan Dimov (BUL)	A	133	~~136~~	~~137~~	7	152	160	~~164~~	14	293
7	Teerapat Chomchuen (THA)	A	130	~~133~~	~~133~~	10	~~162~~	163	~~167~~	9	293
8	Trịnh Văn Vinh (VIE)	A	126	130	~~132~~	11	162	~~166~~	~~166~~	10	292
9	Aniq Kasdan (MAS)	C	122	125	~~127~~	18	160	166	~~167~~	3rd place, bronze medalist(s)	291
10	Arley Calderón (CUB)	B	121	~~126~~	126	14	156	162	165	6	291
11	Aznil Bidin (MAS)	D	~~125~~	125	129	12	155	161	~~163~~	11	290
12	Nguyễn Trần Anh Tuấn (VIE)	A	129	~~133~~	~~133~~	13	157	161	~~164~~	12	290
13	Simon Brandhuber (GER)	B	130	133	~~135~~	6	149	154	~~157~~	20	287
14	Adkhamjon Ergashev (UZB)	A	126	~~130~~	~~130~~	15	~~157~~	~~160~~	160	15	286
15	Gabriel Marinov (BUL)	B	120	~~123~~	~~124~~	23	155	161	163	8	283
16	Shin Rok (KOR)	D	120	125	~~130~~	16	150	~~155~~	155	18	280
17	Goderdzi Berdelidze (GEO)	B	123	126	130	9	150	~~156~~	~~156~~	26	280
18	Kao Chan-hung (TPE)	C	122	125	~~127~~	17	~~151~~	151	154	19	279
19	Morea Baru (PNG)	C	120	~~123~~	~~123~~	21	153	~~156~~	156	16	276
20	Víctor Güémez (MEX)	B	120	~~124~~	~~124~~	24	152	156	~~160~~	17	276
21	Wilkeinner Lugo (VEN)	B	120	~~124~~	124	20	150	~~154~~	—	25	274
22	Shubham Todkar (IND)	D	~~115~~	115	119	25	145	150	~~155~~	24	269
23	Luis Bardalez (PER)	C	~~118~~	118	~~121~~	26	147	151	~~155~~	21	269
24	Kaito Hirai (JPN)	B	115	~~120~~	~~121~~	31	151	~~156~~	~~156~~	22	266
25	Theerapong Silachai (THA)	D	110	115	~~120~~	28	140	150	—	23	265
26	Daniel Lungu (MDA)	C	120	124	~~126~~	19	140	~~144~~	~~144~~	30	264
27	Seýitjan Mirzaýew (TKM)	C	~~120~~	~~120~~	120	22	~~140~~	~~140~~	140	31	260
28	Cosmin Isofache (ROU)	C	115	~~118~~	~~118~~	30	145	—	—	27	260
29	Youri Simard (CAN)	D	110	~~115~~	115	29	~~143~~	~~143~~	143	28	258
30	Víctor Garrido (ECU)	C	113	~~118~~	~~118~~	32	142	~~147~~	~~147~~	29	255
31	Ulaantsetsegiin Amarbayar (MGL)	D	~~110~~	110	~~115~~	33	130	~~135~~	~~135~~	32	240
32	Hashem Al-Khadrawi (KSA)	D	97	102	105	34	~~122~~	122	128	34	233
33	Valentin Iancu (ROU)	D	90	95	100	36	120	125	130	33	230
34	Davis Niyoyita (UGA)	D	95	~~100~~	~~100~~	37	120	125	127	35	222
35	Mohammad Al-Sawagh (KUW)	D	91	100	~~103~~	35	110	120	~~123~~	36	220
36	Mohammed Al-Mulla (KUW)	D	80	85	~~90~~	38	100	105	—	37	190
37	Joshua Amunga (KEN)	D	75	80	~~85~~	39	90	~~97~~	98	38	178
—	Ricko Saputra (INA)	A	129	~~134~~	134	5	~~160~~	~~167~~	~~167~~	—	—
—	Hampton Morris (USA)	A	~~123~~	~~123~~	~~123~~	—	163	~~168~~	168 JWR	1st place, gold medalist(s)	—
—	Henadz Laptseu (AIN)	A	~~132~~	~~132~~	~~132~~	—	—	—	—	—	—
—	Amine Bouhijbha (TUN)	B	116	~~120~~	~~120~~	27	~~145~~	~~145~~	~~146~~	—	—
—	Elyas Al-Busaidi (OMA)	B	~~118~~	~~118~~	~~120~~	—	~~152~~	~~152~~	—	—	—
—	Brian Reisenauer (USA)	C	~~113~~	—	—	—	—	—	—	—	—
—	Mustafa Eliş (TUR)	C	—	—	—	—	—	—	—	—	—
