= Hampton Morris =

American weightlifter (born 2004)

Personal information
- Full name: Hampton Miller Morris
- Born: February 17, 2004 (age 22) Marietta, Georgia, U.S.
- Education: Alan C. Pope High School

Sport
- Country: United States
- Sport: Weightlifting
- Weight class: 65 kg
- Coached by: Tripp Morris
Medal record
Men's weightlifting
Representing United States
Olympic Games
Bronze medal – third place	2024 Paris	61 kg
World Championships
Bronze medal – third place	2025 Førde	65 kg
Bronze medal – third place	2026 Ningbo	65 kg
IWF World Cup
Silver medal – second place	2024 Phuket	61 kg
Pan American Championships
Gold medal – first place	2021 Guayaquil	61 kg
Gold medal – first place	2022 Bogotá	61 kg
Gold medal – first place	2023 Bariloche	61 kg
Gold medal – first place	2025 Cali	65 kg
Silver medal – second place	2026 Panama City	65 kg
Junior World Championships
Gold medal – first place	2022 Heraklion	61 kg
Gold medal – first place	2024 León	61 kg
Silver medal – second place	2023 Guadalajara	67 kg
Youth World Championships
Gold medal – first place	2021 Jeddah	61 kg
Junior Pan American Games
Silver medal – second place	2021 Cali-Valle	61 kg
Junior Pan-American Championships
Gold medal – first place	2020 Manizales	61 kg
Gold medal – first place	2022 Lima	61 kg
Pan-American Youth Weightlifting Championships
Bronze medal – third place	2018 Palmira	50 kg
Gold medal – first place	2019 Guayaquil	61 kg

Hampton Miller Morris (born February 17, 2004) is an American weightlifter. At the 2024 Summer Olympics, he won bronze in the men's 61 kg event. He is a four-time gold medalist at the Pan American Weightlifting Championships. He also currently holds both the junior and senior clean and jerk world records in the men's 61 kg class.

== Early life ==
Hampton Morris was born on February 17, 2004 in Marietta, Georgia to Anne Marie and Tripp Morris. He has a younger sister Etta. He attended Alan C. Pope High School in Marietta and graduated in 2022.

Morris played soccer at school. When he was ten, he followed his parents doing CrossFit and learned weightlifting as a way of getting stronger for soccer. He started competing in weightlifting in local competitions, and in 2017 when he was 13, he competed and won at a national-level event in Atlanta. Following this win, he dropped soccer for weightlifting. His father Tripp served as his coach.

== Career ==
Morris won the gold medal in the men's 61 kg event at the 2021 Pan American Weightlifting Championships held in Guayaquil, Ecuador. He won the silver medal in his event at the 2021 Junior Pan American Games held in Colombia. Morris was also one of the flagbearers for the United States during the opening ceremony.

Morris won the gold medal in the men's 61 kg event at the 2022 Junior World Weightlifting Championships held in Heraklion, Greece. Lifting 160 kg in the Clean & Jerk also was a junior world record.

He won the gold medal in his event at the 2022 Pan American Weightlifting Championships held in Bogotá, Colombia. Morris also set a new junior world record of 162 kg in the Clean & Jerk. He improved this record to 163 kg at the 2022 Pan American Junior Weightlifting Championships held in Lima, Peru.

Morris competed in the men's 61 kg event at the 2022 World Weightlifting Championships held in Bogotá, Colombia. He won the gold medal in his event at the 2023 Pan American Weightlifting Championships held in Bariloche, Argentina. He also won the gold medal in the Snatch and Clean & Jerk events.

On September 6, 2023, Morris won the gold medal in the clean and jerk at the 2023 World Weightlifting Championships men's 61 kg, becoming the first American man to win a gold medal at a World Championship since 1972.

On August 7, 2024, Morris became the first male U.S. weightlifter to win an Olympic medal since 1984, with his bronze in the men's 61 kg event at the 2024 Summer Olympics in Paris, France.

He won the gold medal in his event at the 2025 Pan American Weightlifting Championships held in Cali, Colombia. He competed in the 65 kg weight class after the IWF updated the bodyweight categories from June 1, 2025 onwards.

At the 2026 Pan American Weightlifting Championships in Panama City, Panama, Morris won 3 Silver medals in the 65 kg weight class.

Morris won a second world medal at the 2026 World Weightlifting Championships. Hampton won a Bronze in the Total and a Silver in the Clean & Jerk in the 65 kg weight class.

== Achievements ==
Year	Venue	Weight	Snatch (kg)				Clean & Jerk (kg)				Total	Rank
Year	Venue	Weight	1	2	3	Rank	1	2	3	Rank	Total	Rank
Summer Olympics
2024	Paris, France	61 kg	122	~~125~~	126	—N/a	~~168~~	172	~~178~~	—N/a	298	3rd place, bronze medalist(s)
IWF World Cup
2024	Phuket, Thailand	61 kg	124	127	~~130~~	11	~~169~~	172	176 CWR	1st place, gold medalist(s)	303	2nd place, silver medalist(s)
World Championships
2022	Bogotá, Colombia	61 kg	~~118~~	118	~~124~~	16	157	~~163~~	~~164~~	9	275	15
2023	Riyadh, Saudi Arabia	61 kg	~~123~~	~~123~~	~~123~~	—	163	~~168~~	168	1st place, gold medalist(s)	—	—
2025	Førde, Norway	65 kg	~~131~~	133	~~139~~	9	178	~~183~~	~~183~~	3rd place, bronze medalist(s)	311	3rd place, bronze medalist(s)
2026	Ningbo, China	65 kg	132	137	143	5	180	185	~~189~~	2nd place, silver medalist(s)	328	3rd place, bronze medalist(s)
Pan American Championships
2021	Guayaquil, Ecuador	61 kg	112	~~116~~	117	3rd place, bronze medalist(s)	148	151	~~157~~	1st place, gold medalist(s)	268	1st place, gold medalist(s)
2022	Bogotá, Colombia	61 kg	~~117~~	117	~~122~~	5	153	158	162	1st place, gold medalist(s)	279	1st place, gold medalist(s)
2023	Bariloche, Argentina	61 kg	120	123	~~126~~	1st place, gold medalist(s)	~~158~~	158	~~164~~	1st place, gold medalist(s)	281	1st place, gold medalist(s)
2025	Cali, Colombia	65 kg	127	132	137	1st place, gold medalist(s)	177	181; WR	~~186~~	1st place, gold medalist(s)	318; AM	1st place, gold medalist(s)
2026	Panama City, Panama	65 kg	130	134	138	2nd place, silver medalist(s)	177	~~183~~	~~183~~	2nd place, silver medalist(s)	315	2nd place, silver medalist(s)
