= Weightlifting at the 2024 Summer Olympics – Men's 61 kg =

Men's 61 kg at the Games of the XXXIII Olympiad
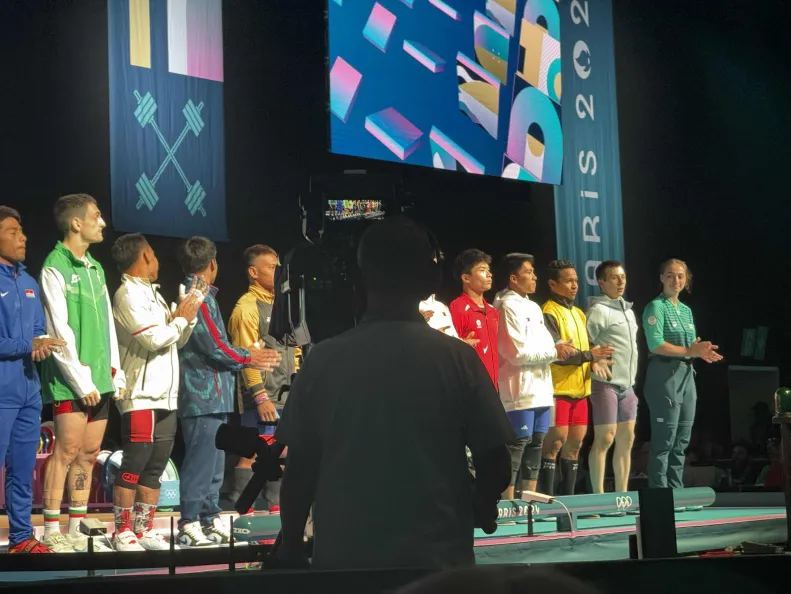
- Line-up of athletes who participated in the competition
- Venue: Paris Expo Porte de Versailles
- Date: 7 August 2024
- Competitors: 12 from 12 nations
- Winning total: 310 kg

Medalists
1st place, gold medalist(s)		Li Fabin	China
2nd place, silver medalist(s)		Theerapong Silachai	Thailand
3rd place, bronze medalist(s)		Hampton Morris	United States

The men's 61 kg weightlifting competition at the 2024 Summer Olympics was held on 7 August at the Paris Expo Porte de Versailles.

Going into the competition, Li Fabin of China was the favourite, while Sergio Massidda of Italy, clean and jerk world record holder Hampton Morris of the United States, and four-time Olympic medalist Eko Yuli Irawan of Indonesia were also among the top contenders. In the final, Li won gold, followed by Theerapong Silachai of Thailand with silver and Morris winning bronze. Li also set an Olympic record of 143 kilograms in the snatch. The best ever results in Olympic competition by Papua New Guinea and Kiribati were also set during the final.

== Background ==
Li Fabin was the defending Olympic champion in the men's 61 kg; he placed first at the 2022 World Weightlifting Championships, the first eligible event during the qualification timeline, and broke the world record in the clean and jerk with 175 kilograms. He placed first at the 2023 Asian Weightlifting Championships, defeating Chen Lijun who was the Olympic champion at the last Summer Games in the men's 67 kg event and was aiming to qualify for the 2024 Summer Games in the same category.

Li placed first at the 2023 World Weightlifting Championships, but was defeated by Hampton Morris in the clean and jerk. The 2024 IWF World Cup was the last competition during the qualification period. There, Li broke the snatch world record with 146 kilograms and placed first overall. Though, he would be defeated by four other athletes in the clean and jerk, three of which were eligible for the 2024 Summer Olympics: Morris, Theerapong Silachai, and John Ceniza. Morris also broke the world record in the clean and jerk with 176 kilograms.

Sports Illustrated predicted that Li would win, followed by Massidda in second and Morris in third. Eko Yuli Irawan, a four-time Olympic medalist, was opined by Brian Oliver of the International Weightlifting Federation and Eric Goodman of NBC Olympics as another medal contender.

=== Qualification ===
Qualification for every event had spots for at least twelve weightlifters coming from different National Olympic Committees (NOC). Qualification spots were eligible for the ten highest-ranked weightlifters in the IWF Olympic Qualification Ranking, the highest-ranked weightlifter representing an NOC whose continent lies outside the top ten (IWF Olympic Continental Qualification Ranking), the host nation's reserved entry and a universality place. If a spot was still available once every continent was represented in the top ten, the host nation did not send an entry, a universality place was not used, or any combination of the following, the quota place was allocated to the next highest-ranked eligible weightlifter.

To be eligible for the event, all weightlifters must have competed at the 2023 World Weightlifting Championships in Riyadh, 2024 IWF World Cup in Phuket, and in at least three qualifying tournaments. Apart from two compulsory events, the host country France and those eligible for universality places may have competed in a minimum of two qualifying tournaments. For the men's 61 kg category, twelve athletes qualified for the event with the absence of a host nation entry.

Qualified weightlifters
Weightlifter	Country	Total (kg)	Qualification
Li Fabin	China	314	Ranking
Hampton Morris	United States	303	Ranking
Sergio Massidda	Italy	302	Ranking
Eko Yuli Irawan	Indonesia	300	Ranking
John Ceniza	Philippines	300	Ranking
Theerapong Silachai	Thailand	299	Ranking
Shota Mishvelidze	Georgia	298	Ranking
Aniq Kasdan	Malaysia	296	Ranking
Trịnh Văn Vinh	Vietnam	294	Ranking
Ivan Dimov	Bulgaria	293	Ranking
Morea Baru	Papua New Guinea	281	Continental ranking
Kaimauri Erati	Kiribati	—	Universality place

=== Records ===
The world records before the competition for the snatch and total was set by Li at the 2024 IWF World Cup and 2019 World Weightlifting Championships respectively, while the clean and jerk world record was set by Morris at the 2024 IWF World Cup. The Olympic records for the clean and jerk and total was set by Li at the 2020 Summer Olympics though the Olympic Standard of 142 kilograms in the snatch was yet to be broken.

Records before the competition
World Record	Snatch	Li Fabin (CHN)	146 kg	Phuket, Thailand	2 April 2024
World Record	Clean & Jerk	Hampton Morris (USA)	176 kg	Phuket, Thailand	2 April 2024
World Record	Total	Li Fabin (CHN)	318 kg	Pattaya, Thailand	19 September 2019
Olympic Record	Snatch	Olympic Standard	142 kg	—	1 November 2018
Olympic Record	Clean & Jerk	Li Fabin (CHN)	172 kg	Tokyo, Japan	25 July 2021
Olympic Record	Total	Li Fabin (CHN)	313 kg	Tokyo, Japan	25 July 2021

== Results ==
The event was held on 7 August, starting at 3:00 p.m., at the Paris Expo Porte de Versailles. Four athletes were eliminated during the snatch portion of the event after failing all three of their attempts. These were, in order: Ceniza, Trịnh, Massidda, and Dimov. Erati had the lightest snatch of the event at 100 kilograms while Li set a new Olympic record with 143 kilograms; Silachai had the third-heaviest snatch at 132 kilograms while Irawan had the second-heaviest at 135 kilograms. Though, Irawan was eliminated during the clean and jerk portion after failing to lift all three of his attempts due to an injury. Erati had the lightest clean and jerk of the event at 120 kilograms while Morris lifted 172 kilograms as the heaviest of the event; Li and Kasdan tied for the third-heaviest clean and jerk of the event at 167 kilograms while Silachai had the second-heaviest at 171 kilograms. Morris also attempted 178 kilograms for his third attempt in order to overtake Silachai but was unsuccessful. With a total of 310 kilograms, Li defended his Olympic title. Silachai and Morris placed second and third, respectively. Baru and Erati also set the best ever results in Olympic competition by Papua New Guinea and Kiribati with fifth and seventh, respectively.

Results
Rank	Athlete	Nation	Snatch (kg)				Clean & Jerk (kg)				Total
Rank	Athlete	Nation	1	2	3	Result	1	2	3	Result	Total
1st place, gold medalist(s)	Li Fabin	China	137	140	143	143 OR	~~167~~	167	~~172~~	167	310
2nd place, silver medalist(s)	Theerapong Silachai	Thailand	127	130	132	132	167	169	171	171	303
3rd place, bronze medalist(s)	Hampton Morris	United States	122	~~125~~	126	126	~~168~~	172	~~178~~	172	298
4	Aniq Kasdan	Malaysia	126	~~130~~	130	130	167	~~174~~	~~174~~	167	297
5	Morea Baru	Papua New Guinea	118	~~122~~	~~122~~	118	150	157	161	161	279
6	Shota Mishvelidze	Georgia	114	121	~~128~~	121	125	135	~~150~~	135	256
7	Kaimauri Erati	Kiribati	95	~~100~~	100	100	~~120~~	120	~~124~~	120	220
—	Eko Yuli Irawan	Indonesia	~~135~~	135	~~139~~	135	~~162~~	~~162~~	~~165~~	—	DNF
—	Ivan Dimov	Bulgaria	~~134~~	~~134~~	~~135~~	—	—	—	—	—	DNF
—	Sergio Massidda	Italy	~~132~~	~~134~~	~~134~~	—	—	—	—	—	DNF
—	Trịnh Văn Vinh	Vietnam	~~128~~	~~128~~	~~128~~	—	—	—	—	—	DNF
—	John Ceniza	Philippines	~~125~~	~~125~~	~~125~~	—	—	—	—	—	DNF
