= 2026 European Weightlifting Championships =

Weightlifting competition in Batumi, Georgia

- Venue: Batumi Sport Palace
- Location: Batumi, Georgia
- Dates: 19–26 April
- Competitors: TBA from TBA with 1 outside European nations

The 2026 European Weightlifting Championships took place in Batumi, Georgia, from 19 to 26 April 2026.

== Background ==
The competition will also serve as the qualification event for XXIII Commonwealth Games in Glasgow in 2026. Therefore, outside of traditional European teams will also participate in the tournament. Teams expected to compete include Jersey, Gibraltar, Isle of Man, as well as South Africa ( will remain outside the official standings in the final list). In addition, the tournament will feature a separate Great Britain team, along with teams from England, Wales, Scotland, and Northern Ireland.

== Squad ==
Final entry list per category -

Participants from Non-European countries:

- South Africa: Cheyenne Smith, F86, Entry Total: 178 kg
- South Africa: Christoffel Reeders, M110+, Entry Total: 312 kg
- Refugee Olympic Team: Ramiro Mora Romero

== Schedule ==
All times are local (UTC+4).

Men's events
Date Event	Mon 20			Tue 21		Wed 22		Thu 23			Fri 24		Sat 25				Sun 26
Date Event	09:30	12:00	15:00	14:00	19:00	11:00	19:00	08:30	12:00	16:00	13:00	16:00	09:00	11:00	13:00	19:00	16:00
60 kg	B	A															
65 kg	B		A														
71 kg				B	A												
79 kg						B	A										
88 kg								C	B	A							
94 kg											B	A					
110 kg													C	B		A	
+110 kg													C		B		A

Women's events
Date Event	Sun 19					Mon 20	Tue 21			Wed 22			Thu 23			Fri 24		Sat 25	Sun 26
Date Event	09:00	11:00	13:00	16:00	19:00	18:00	10:00	12:00	16:00	09:00	13:00	16:00	10:00	14:00	19:00	11:00	19:00	16:00	13:00
48 kg	B			A															
53 kg	C	B			A														
58 kg			B			A													
63 kg							C	B	A										
69 kg										C	B	A							
77 kg													C	B	A				
86 kg																B	A		
+86 kg																		B	A

== Medal table ==
Ranking by Big (Total result) medals

* Host nation (Georgia)

Rank	Nation	Gold	Silver	Bronze	Total
1	Armenia	3	4	1	8
–	Individual Neutral Athletes	2	5	4	11
2	Bulgaria	2	1	2	5
3	Turkey	2	0	3	5
4	Great Britain	2	0	1	3
5	Ukraine	1	1	1	3
6	Belgium	1	0	0	1
6	Finland	1	0	0	1
6	Italy	1	0	0	1
6	Moldova	1	0	0	1
10	Romania	0	2	0	2
11	Georgia*	0	1	1	2
12	Albania	0	1	0	1
12	Norway	0	1	0	1
14	Bosnia and Herzegovina	0	0	1	1
14	France	0	0	1	1
14	Germany	0	0	1	1
Totals (16 entries)		16	16	16	48

Ranking by all medals: Big (Total result) and Small (Snatch and Clean & Jerk)

* Host nation (Georgia)

Rank	Nation	Gold	Silver	Bronze	Total
1	Armenia	9	8	7	24
2	Bulgaria	6	5	3	14
–	Individual Neutral Athletes	5	12	10	27
3	Turkey	4	3	9	16
4	Great Britain	4	1	2	7
5	Ukraine	3	2	7	12
6	Italy	3	1	2	6
7	Romania	2	4	1	7
8	Georgia*	2	2	4	8
9	Belgium	2	1	0	3
9	Finland	2	1	0	3
9	Moldova	2	1	0	3
12	Norway	1	2	0	3
13	France	1	1	1	3
14	Albania	1	1	0	2
15	Germany	1	0	1	2
16	Bosnia and Herzegovina	0	1	1	2
17	Azerbaijan	0	1	0	1
17	Spain	0	1	0	1
Totals (18 entries)		48	48	48	144

== Team ranking ==
=== Men ===
Rank	Team	Points
1	Armenia	567
2	Bulgaria	540
3	Turkey	539
4	Romania	408
5	Georgia	359
6	Moldova	340

=== Women ===
Rank	Team	Points
1	Ukraine	463
2	Turkey	442
3	Armenia	424
4	Romania	415
5	Great Britain	350
6	Italy	311

== Medal overview ==
=== Men ===
Event		Gold		Silver		Bronze	
– 60 kg	Snatch	Goderdzi Berdelidze (GEO)	125 kg	Garnik Cholakyan (ARM)	124 kg	Ramini Shamilishvili (GEO)	122 kg
– 60 kg	Clean & Jerk	Angel Rusev (BUL)	155 kg	Deniz Danev (BUL)	151 kg	Garnik Cholakyan (ARM)	150 kg
– 60 kg	Total	Angel Rusev (BUL)	275 kg	Garnik Cholakyan (ARM)	274 kg	Yiğit Erdoğan (TUR)	269 kg EJR
– 65 kg	Snatch	Ivan Dimov (BUL)	145 kg	Muhammed Furkan Özbek (TUR)	143 kg	Ferdi Hardal (TUR)	135 kg
– 65 kg	Clean & Jerk	Muhammed Furkan Özbek (TUR)	180 kg ER	Ivan Dimov (BUL)	172 kg	Sergio Massidda (ITA)	171 kg
– 65 kg	Total	Muhammed Furkan Özbek (TUR)	323 kg	Ivan Dimov (BUL)	317 kg	Ferdi Hardal (TUR)	293 kg
– 71 kg	Snatch	Gor Sahakyan (ARM)	150 kg	Isa Rustamov (AZE)	147 kg	Yusuf Fehmi Genç (TUR)	147 kg
– 71 kg	Clean & Jerk	Yusuf Fehmi Genç (TUR)	185 kg	Yahor Papou (AIN)	183 kg	Gor Sahakyan (ARM)	180 kg
– 71 kg	Total	Yusuf Fehmi Genç (TUR)	332 kg	Gor Sahakyan (ARM)	330 kg	Yahor Papou (AIN)	328 kg
– 79 kg	Snatch	Gevorg Serobian (AIN)	161 kg ER	Kaan Kahriman (TUR)	156 kg	Tiberiu Donose (ROU)	154 kg
– 79 kg	Clean & Jerk	Briken Calja (ALB)	187 kg	Martin Poghosyan (ARM)	186 kg	Archil Malakmadze (GEO)	183 kg
– 79 kg	Total	Gevorg Serobian (AIN)	341 kg	Briken Calja (ALB)	340 kg	Martin Poghosyan (ARM)	338 kg
– 88 kg	Snatch	Marin Robu (MDA)	173 kg ER	Andranik Karapetyan (BIH)	167 kg	Manuchar Gogokhia (GEO)	166 kg
– 88 kg	Clean & Jerk	Zurab Mskhaladze (GEO)	200 kg	Marin Robu (MDA)	200 kg	Cristiano Ficco (ITA)	197 kg
– 88 kg	Total	Marin Robu (MDA)	373 kg	Zurab Mskhaladze (GEO)	363 kg	Andranik Karapetyan (BIH)	361 kg
– 94 kg	Snatch	Karlos Nasar (BUL)	176 kg	Ara Aghanyan (ARM)	175 kg	Hakan Şükrü Kurnaz (TUR)	166 kg
– 94 kg	Clean & Jerk	Karlos Nasar (BUL)	210 kg	Romain Imadouchène (FRA)	207 kg	Ara Aghanyan (ARM)	206 kg
– 94 kg	Total	Karlos Nasar (BUL)	386 kg	Ara Aghanyan (ARM)	381 kg	Romain Imadouchène (FRA)	370 kg
– 110 kg	Snatch	Luis Lauret (ROU)	195 kg ER	Hristo Hristov (BUL)	190 kg	Garik Karapetyan (ARM)	189 kg
– 110 kg	Clean & Jerk	Garik Karapetyan (ARM)	226 kg	Khas-Magomed Balaev (AIN)	225 kg	Hristo Hristov (BUL)	222 kg
– 110 kg	Total	Garik Karapetyan (ARM)	415 kg	Luis Lauret (ROU)	414 kg	Hristo Hristov (BUL)	412 kg
+ 110 kg	Snatch	Varazdat Lalayan (ARM)	210 kg	Daniil Vagaitsev (AIN)	192 kg	Timur Naniev (AIN)	191 kg
+ 110 kg	Clean & Jerk	Varazdat Lalayan (ARM)	241 kg	Daniil Vagaitsev (AIN)	233 kg	Vladyslav Prylypko (UKR)	231 kg
+ 110 kg	Total	Varazdat Lalayan (ARM)	451 kg	Daniil Vagaitsev (AIN)	425 kg	Timur Naniev (AIN)	418 kg

=== Women ===
Event		Gold		Silver		Bronze	
– 48 kg	Snatch	Giulia Imperio (ITA)	78 kg	Boyana Kostadinova (BUL)	77 kg	Kateryna Malashchuk (UKR)	77 kg
– 48 kg	Clean & Jerk	Giulia Imperio (ITA)	98 kg	Gamze Altun (TUR)	97 kg	Kateryna Malashchuk (UKR)	95 kg
– 48 kg	Total	Giulia Imperio (ITA)	176 kg	Kateryna Malashchuk (UKR)	172 kg	Boyana Kostadinova (BUL)	169 kg
– 53 kg	Snatch	Mihaela Cambei (ROU)	95 kg ER	Nina Sterckx (BEL)	94 kg	Cansel Özkan (TUR)	92 kg
– 53 kg	Clean & Jerk	Nina Sterckx (BEL)	116 kg ER	Mihaela Cambei (ROU)	114 kg	Cansel Özkan (TUR)	106 kg
– 53 kg	Total	Nina Sterckx (BEL)	210 kg ER	Mihaela Cambei (ROU)	209 kg	Cansel Özkan (TUR)	198 kg
– 58 kg	Snatch	Kamila Konotop (UKR)	100 kg	Noemi Filippazzo (ITA)	94 kg	Olga Te (AIN)	93 kg
– 58 kg	Clean & Jerk	Kamila Konotop (UKR)	121 kg	Olha Ivzhenko (UKR)	120 kg	Aleksandra Grigoryan (ARM)	119 kg
– 58 kg	Total	Kamila Konotop (UKR)	221 kg	Aleksandra Grigoryan (ARM)	210 kg	Olga Te (AIN)	209 kg
– 63 kg	Snatch	Maëlyn Michel (FRA)	100 kg	Andreea Cotruța (ROU)	99 kg	Svitlana Moskvina (UKR)	98 kg
– 63 kg	Clean & Jerk	Sarah Davies (GBR)	125 kg	Alina Shchapanava (AIN)	122 kg	Dziyana Maiseyevich (AIN)	120 kg
– 63 kg	Total	Sarah Davies (GBR)	219 kg	Alina Shchapanava (AIN)	218 kg	Dziyana Maiseyevich (AIN)	217 kg
– 69 kg	Snatch	Lisa Schweizer (GER)	109 kg	Siuzanna Valodzka (AIN)	108 kg	Zarina Gusalova (AIN)	105 kg
– 69 kg	Clean & Jerk	Siuzanna Valodzka (AIN)	129 kg	Naroa Arrasate (ESP)	128 kg	Zarina Gusalova (AIN)	127 kg
– 69 kg	Total	Siuzanna Valodzka (AIN)	237 kg	Zarina Gusalova (AIN)	232 kg	Lisa Schweizer (GER)	231 kg
– 77 kg	Snatch	Janette Ylisoini (FIN)	113 kg EJR	Varvara Kuzminova (AIN)	112 kg	Iryna Dombrovska (UKR)	110 kg
– 77 kg	Clean & Jerk	Anna Amroyan (ARM)	136 kg EJR	Janette Ylisoini (FIN)	134 kg	Iryna Dombrovska (UKR)	133 kg
– 77 kg	Total	Janette Ylisoini (FIN)	247 kg EJR	Varvara Kuzminova (AIN)	244 kg	Iryna Dombrovska (UKR)	243 kg
– 86 kg	Snatch	Iana Sotieva (AIN)	112 kg	Madias Nzesso (GBR)	111 kg	Emma Poghosyan (ARM)	107 kg
– 86 kg	Clean & Jerk	Emma Poghosyan (ARM)	141 kg EJR	Liana Gyurjyan (ARM)	135 kg	Iana Sotieva (AIN)	135 kg
– 86 kg	Total	Emma Poghosyan (ARM)	248 kg EJR	Iana Sotieva (AIN)	247 kg	Madias Nzesso (GBR)	240 kg
+ 86 kg	Snatch	Solfrid Koanda (NOR)	119 kg	Anastasiia Hotfrid (GEO)	118 kg	Emily Campbell (GBR)	117 kg
+ 86 kg	Clean & Jerk	Emily Campbell (GBR)	159 kg ER	Solfrid Koanda (NOR)	156 kg	Tuana Süren (TUR)	145 kg EJR
+ 86 kg	Total	Emily Campbell (GBR)	276 kg ER	Solfrid Koanda (NOR)	275 kg	Anastasiia Hotfrid (GEO)	262 kg

== Men's results ==
=== Men's 60 kg ===
Rank	Athlete	Group	Snatch (kg)				Clean & Jerk (kg)				Total
Rank	Athlete	Group	1	2	3	Rank	1	2	3	Rank	Total
1st place, gold medalist(s)	Angel Rusev (BUL)	A	117	~~120~~	120	6	~~155~~	~~155~~	155	1st place, gold medalist(s)	275
2nd place, silver medalist(s)	Garnik Cholakyan (ARM)	A	120	~~124~~	124	2nd place, silver medalist(s)	145	150	~~156~~	3rd place, bronze medalist(s)	274
3rd place, bronze medalist(s)	Yiğit Erdoğan (TUR)	A	115	119	121	4	~~147~~	148	~~151~~	4	269
4	Ramini Shamilishvili (GEO)	A	115	119	122	3rd place, bronze medalist(s)	141	146	~~149~~	6	268
5	Burak Aykun (TUR)	A	~~117~~	~~117~~	119	7	~~147~~	147	~~150~~	5	266
6	Deniz Danev (BUL)	A	115	~~119~~	~~120~~	9	~~147~~	147	151	2nd place, silver medalist(s)	266
7	Daniel Lungu (MDA)	A	115	120	~~123~~	5	135	~~141~~	141	9	261
8	Tehran Mammadov (AZE)	B	118	~~123~~	~~125~~	8	135	~~142~~	142	8	260
9	Marian Luca (ROU)	A	115	~~120~~	~~122~~	10	135	~~140~~	~~142~~	11	250
10	Stefan Vladisavljev (SRB)	B	~~110~~	~~110~~	110	11	135	—	—	10	245
11	Iulian Betca (MDA)	B	95	~~99~~	100	12	115	~~119~~	120	12	220
—	Goderdzi Berdelidze (GEO)	A	123	~~125~~	125	1st place, gold medalist(s)	~~146~~	—	—	—	—
—	Narcis Papolti (ROU)	A	~~116~~	~~116~~	~~118~~	—	138	143	~~146~~	7	—
X	Kieran Stiles (ENG)	B	95	~~100~~	~~100~~	—	~~124~~	124	~~128~~	—	219

=== Men's 65 kg ===
Rank	Athlete	Group	Snatch (kg)				Clean & Jerk (kg)				Total
Rank	Athlete	Group	1	2	3	Rank	1	2	3	Rank	Total
1st place, gold medalist(s)	Muhammed Furkan Özbek (TUR)	A	140	143	~~146~~	2nd place, silver medalist(s)	170	175	180	1st place, gold medalist(s)	323
2nd place, silver medalist(s)	Ivan Dimov (BUL)	A	137	141	145	1st place, gold medalist(s)	166	172	~~177~~	2nd place, silver medalist(s)	317
3rd place, bronze medalist(s)	Ferdi Hardal (TUR)	A	~~135~~	~~135~~	135	3rd place, bronze medalist(s)	158	~~161~~	~~162~~	4	293
4	Ion Badanev (MDA)	A	125	~~129~~	129	4	155	~~160~~	~~162~~	6	284
5	Dimitris Minasidis (CYP)	A	121	126	~~130~~	6	152	~~156~~	158	5	284
6	Zdravko Pelovski (BUL)	A	120	124	~~127~~	7	150	155	~~161~~	7	279
7	Cosmin Isofache (ROU)	A	123	~~126~~	~~126~~	8	~~150~~	~~150~~	151	8	274
8	Ion Dorobete (ROU)	A	127	~~132~~	~~132~~	5	140	~~147~~	~~147~~	11	267
9	Konstantinos Lampridis (GRE)	B	110	115	~~118~~	9	140	~~145~~	145	10	260
—	Sergio Massidda (ITA)	A	~~140~~	~~141~~	~~141~~	—	165	171	~~176~~	3rd place, bronze medalist(s)	—
—	Andrii Revko (UKR)	A	~~120~~	~~120~~	~~120~~	—	147	~~154~~	~~154~~	9	—

=== Men's 71 kg ===
Rank	Athlete	Group	Snatch (kg)				Clean & Jerk (kg)				Total
Rank	Athlete	Group	1	2	3	Rank	1	2	3	Rank	Total
1st place, gold medalist(s)	Yusuf Fehmi Genç (TUR)	A	~~146~~	~~147~~	147	3rd place, bronze medalist(s)	185	~~193~~	~~193~~	1st place, gold medalist(s)	332
2nd place, silver medalist(s)	Gor Sahakyan (ARM)	A	145	150	~~155~~	1st place, gold medalist(s)	180	~~185~~	~~185~~	3rd place, bronze medalist(s)	330
3rd place, bronze medalist(s)	Yahor Papou (AIN)	A	145	~~148~~	~~148~~	5	175	~~183~~	183	2nd place, silver medalist(s)	328
4	Isa Rustamov (AZE)	A	~~147~~	147	~~149~~	2nd place, silver medalist(s)	~~178~~	~~178~~	180	4	327
5	Zulfat Garaev (AIN)	A	140	~~146~~	146	4	165	~~170~~	~~170~~	8	311
6	Engin Kara (TUR)	A	138	~~143~~	143	6	157	164	~~167~~	9	307
7	Dian Pampordzhiev (BUL)	A	128	132	134	7	168	~~174~~	~~174~~	6	302
8	Harrison McGrogan (IRL)	B	120	124	128	11	157	163	170	5	298
9	Jonathan Chin (GBR)	B	122	126	130	9	160	165	~~170~~	7	295
10	Piotr Kudłaszyk (POL)	A	128	131	~~133~~	8	162	~~168~~	~~168~~	11	293
11	Bernardin Matam (FRA)	A	129	~~132~~	~~132~~	10	162	~~165~~	~~165~~	10	291
12	Ivan Novko (CRO)	B	~~110~~	110	115	12	145	~~150~~	~~150~~	12	260
13	Faris Durak (BIH)	B	95	~~102~~	~~102~~	13	115	~~119~~	~~119~~	13	210
—	Gheorghe Cernei (MDA)	A	~~137~~	~~137~~	~~137~~	—	—	—	—	—	—
X	Michael Farmer (WAL)	B	124	127	129	—	152	~~154~~	~~154~~	—	281

=== Men's 79 kg ===
Rank	Athlete	Group	Snatch (kg)				Clean & Jerk (kg)				Total
Rank	Athlete	Group	1	2	3	Rank	1	2	3	Rank	Total
1st place, gold medalist(s)	Gevorg Serobian (AIN)	A	155	158	161	1st place, gold medalist(s)	176	180	~~183~~	7	341
2nd place, silver medalist(s)	Briken Calja (ALB)	A	153	~~157~~	~~157~~	4	~~185~~	185	187	1st place, gold medalist(s)	340
3rd place, bronze medalist(s)	Martin Poghosyan (ARM)	A	148	~~152~~	152	10	186	~~190~~	~~190~~	2nd place, silver medalist(s)	338
4	Kaan Kahriman (TUR)	A	152	156	~~159~~	2nd place, silver medalist(s)	173	181	~~185~~	5	337
5	Archil Malakmadze (GEO)	A	148	153	~~156~~	5	175	183	~~186~~	3rd place, bronze medalist(s)	336
6	Vadzim Likharad (AIN)	A	149	~~153~~	153	6	178	183	~~186~~	4	336
7	Tiberiu Donose (ROU)	A	150	154	~~157~~	3rd place, bronze medalist(s)	175	181	~~185~~	6	335
8	Vitalii Daderko (UKR)	A	~~149~~	149	152	9	175	~~180~~	180	8	332
9	Roberto Gutu (GER)	B	145	150	~~152~~	12	~~170~~	173	178	10	328
10	Andrei Fralou (AIN)	A	148	~~151~~	~~151~~	13	179	~~183~~	~~183~~	9	327
11	Hmayak Misakyan (AUT)	B	144	147	151	11	166	171	~~174~~	11	322
12	Konrad Łazuga (POL)	B	~~144~~	144	147	14	170	~~177~~	~~178~~	13	317
13	Kacper Urban (POL)	B	140	145	~~148~~	15	170	~~180~~	~~180~~	12	315
14	Sebastian Cabala (SVK)	B	140	145	~~148~~	16	170	—	—	14	315
15	Vladimir Škapec (SVK)	B	137	141	~~144~~	17	~~168~~	168	—	15	309
16	Lajos Újvári (HUN)	B	132	~~137~~	~~137~~	18	160	~~166~~	~~168~~	17	292
17	Nikola Todorović (CRO)	B	120	125	129	19	150	156	160	18	289
18	Remy Heggvik Aune (NOR)	B	117	120	~~123~~	21	156	~~162~~	162	16	282
19	Stefan Rønnevik (NOR)	B	115	120	~~125~~	20	140	147	~~155~~	19	267
—	Ravin Almammadov (AZE)	A	152	~~156~~	—	7	—	—	—	—	—
—	Erkand Qerimaj (ALB)	A	~~152~~	152	~~157~~	8	~~184~~	~~184~~	~~187~~	—	—
X	Iain Wilson (SCO)	B	~~124~~	~~124~~	124	—	~~154~~	154	~~160~~	—	278
X	Jason Epton (SCO)	B	~~118~~	118	122	—	155	~~162~~	~~162~~	—	277
X	James Knox (NIR)	B	118	~~123~~	124	—	147	151	~~154~~	—	275
X	Tom Appleton (GIB)	B	70	75	80	—	90	~~95~~	~~95~~	—	170

=== Men's 88 kg ===
Rank	Athlete	Group	Snatch (kg)				Clean & Jerk (kg)				Total
Rank	Athlete	Group	1	2	3	Rank	1	2	3	Rank	Total
1st place, gold medalist(s)	Marin Robu (MDA)	A	168	~~169~~	173	1st place, gold medalist(s)	195	200	~~204~~	2nd place, silver medalist(s)	373
2nd place, silver medalist(s)	Zurab Mskhaladze (GEO)	A	158	163	~~167~~	5	194	200	~~205~~	1st place, gold medalist(s)	363
3rd place, bronze medalist(s)	Andranik Karapetyan (BIH)	A	163	~~167~~	167	2nd place, silver medalist(s)	182	190	194	8	361
4	Manuchar Gogokhia (GEO)	A	157	162	166	3rd place, bronze medalist(s)	192	~~197~~	~~197~~	9	358
5	Cristiano Ficco (ITA)	A	153	158	161	6	187	193	197	3rd place, bronze medalist(s)	358
6	Petr Asayonak (AIN)	A	~~160~~	160	~~164~~	7	190	196	~~202~~	5	356
7	Rafik Harutyunyan (ARM)	A	~~160~~	160	~~164~~	8	~~195~~	195	~~202~~	7	355
8	Artem Okulov (AIN)	A	156	~~161~~	~~163~~	9	196	~~202~~	—	4	352
9	Lukas Müller (GER)	A	145	150	155	11	195	~~201~~	~~202~~	6	350
10	Artūrs Vasiļonoks (LAT)	B	148	152	155	10	183	~~187~~	~~188~~	12	338
11	Mihăiță Tănăsoiu (ROU)	B	145	150	~~155~~	12	~~185~~	~~185~~	186	11	336
12	Javier González (ESP)	B	143	148	~~151~~	13	180	~~186~~	187	10	335
13	Oskar Ołubek (POL)	B	138	142	145	16	172	177	181	13	326
14	Irmantas Kačinskas (LTU)	B	142	146	~~148~~	14	173	178	~~181~~	14	324
15	Petr Mareček (CZE)	B	~~140~~	140	144	17	174	~~179~~	~~180~~	15	318
16	Christopher Russ (GBR)	B	140	143	146	15	166	~~170~~	~~170~~	18	312
17	Youssef El Amrani (BEL)	B	~~134~~	134	~~138~~	19	170	~~175~~	~~175~~	16	304
18	Seán Brown (IRL)	B	~~132~~	~~135~~	135	18	162	166	~~172~~	19	301
19	Karol Samko (SVK)	B	125	~~130~~	~~130~~	23	165	~~170~~	170	17	295
20	David Birk (SLO)	C	123	127	~~130~~	21	151	~~156~~	158	22	285
21	Sigurd Haug Korsvoll (NOR)	C	~~125~~	125	~~130~~	22	160	~~165~~	~~165~~	21	285
22	Johannes Schwerin (DEN)	C	124	129	~~133~~	20	148	~~149~~	~~156~~	23	277
—	Ramzan Dzhankhotov (AIN)	A	160	~~165~~	165	4	~~192~~	~~193~~	~~193~~	—	—
—	Kianoush Rostami (KOS)	A	~~167~~	~~167~~	~~169~~	—	—	—	—	—	—
—	Väinö Suoniemi (FIN)	B	~~131~~	~~131~~	~~132~~	—	~~164~~	164	~~167~~	20	—
X	Edward Smale (ENG)	B	138	~~142~~	143	—	~~170~~	~~170~~	—	—	—
X	Angus Doig (SCO)	C	~~133~~	~~133~~	~~133~~	—	163	168	~~172~~	—	—
X	James Perera (GIB)	C	~~98~~	~~98~~	~~98~~	—	~~125~~	—	—	—	—

=== Men's 94 kg ===
Rank	Athlete	Group	Snatch (kg)				Clean & Jerk (kg)				Total
Rank	Athlete	Group	1	2	3	Rank	1	2	3	Rank	Total
1st place, gold medalist(s)	Karlos Nasar (BUL)	A	170	176	~~183~~	1st place, gold medalist(s)	~~210~~	210	~~223~~	1st place, gold medalist(s)	386
2nd place, silver medalist(s)	Ara Aghanyan (ARM)	A	167	172	175	2nd place, silver medalist(s)	200	206	~~212~~	3rd place, bronze medalist(s)	381
3rd place, bronze medalist(s)	Romain Imadouchène (FRA)	A	~~162~~	163	~~167~~	5	202	207	~~219~~	2nd place, silver medalist(s)	370
4	Raphael Friedrich (GER)	A	157	161	165	4	194	~~198~~	~~201~~	5	359
5	Mikhail Podkorytov (AIN)	A	156	~~160~~	~~160~~	8	195	200	203	4	359
6	Hakan Şükrü Kurnaz (TUR)	A	~~165~~	~~165~~	166	3rd place, bronze medalist(s)	181	186	~~190~~	11	352
7	Armands Mežinskis (LAT)	A	~~154~~	154	158	7	193	~~197~~	~~200~~	7	351
8	Darius Tătaru (ROU)	B	145	~~150~~	150	10	185	191	~~197~~	8	341
9	Patryk Sawulski (POL)	A	~~152~~	152	~~156~~	9	188	~~190~~	~~190~~	9	340
10	Elias Simbürger (AUT)	B	143	147	~~150~~	12	181	187	~~191~~	10	334
11	Yannick Tschan (SUI)	B	148	~~152~~	~~152~~	11	185	~~190~~	~~191~~	12	333
12	Konsta Suoniemi (FIN)	B	~~145~~	145	~~151~~	13	173	~~176~~	177	14	322
13	Szilárd Fekécs (HUN)	B	140	144	~~148~~	14	~~177~~	177	~~183~~	13	321
14	Jakub Barteček (CZE)	B	137	~~141~~	~~142~~	16	170	~~174~~	175	15	312
15	Antti Peltokangas (FIN)	B	125	129	133	17	170	~~175~~	~~180~~	16	303
16	Peter Dobnik (SLO)	B	140	~~144~~	~~145~~	15	160	~~167~~	~~168~~	17	300
—	Ertjan Kofsha (ALB)	A	~~164~~	~~165~~	~~166~~	—	194	~~198~~	~~198~~	6	—
—	Daniel Kołecki (POL)	A	~~161~~	~~161~~	161	6	~~195~~	~~195~~	~~195~~	—	—
—	Ramiro Mora Romero (EWF)	A	~~162~~	~~162~~	~~163~~	—	—	—	—	—	—
—	Lukas Kordušas (LTU)	B	~~145~~	~~145~~	~~146~~	—	—	—	—	—	—
—	Irakli Gobejishvili (GEO)	A	—	—	—	—	—	—	—	—	—
—	Anton Serdiukov (UKR)	A	—	—	—	—	—	—	—	—	—
X	Joshua Hutton (ENG)	B	149	~~153~~	153	—	167	173	~~177~~	—	326
X	Stephen Bestman (ENG)	B	138	~~142~~	~~142~~	—	176	—	—	—	314
X	Thomas Wright (SCO)	B	137	140	~~143~~	—	161	166	~~170~~	—	306

=== Men's 110 kg ===
Rank	Athlete	Group	Snatch (kg)				Clean & Jerk (kg)				Total
Rank	Athlete	Group	1	2	3	Rank	1	2	3	Rank	Total
1st place, gold medalist(s)	Garik Karapetyan (ARM)	A	183	~~189~~	189	3rd place, bronze medalist(s)	215	226	~~231~~	1st place, gold medalist(s)	415
2nd place, silver medalist(s)	Luis Lauret (ROU)	A	185	190	195	1st place, gold medalist(s)	213	219	~~223~~	5	414
3rd place, bronze medalist(s)	Hristo Hristov (BUL)	A	184	190	~~196~~	2nd place, silver medalist(s)	216	222	~~225~~	3rd place, bronze medalist(s)	412
4	Siarhei Sharankou (AIN)	A	177	181	~~185~~	5	215	220	~~224~~	4	401
5	Khas-Magomed Balaev (AIN)	A	174	~~180~~	~~181~~	7	215	225	~~230~~	2nd place, silver medalist(s)	399
6	Simon Martirosyan (ARM)	A	~~183~~	183	~~190~~	4	215	~~230~~	—	6	398
7	Danylo Chyniakov (UKR)	A	~~170~~	170	176	6	200	211	~~221~~	7	387
8	David Fischerov (BUL)	A	169	~~172~~	172	8	~~211~~	~~211~~	211	9	383
9	Tudor Bratu (MDA)	A	170	~~176~~	~~178~~	10	203	207	211	8	381
10	Benjamin Ferré (FRA)	B	160	164	~~166~~	12	208	~~212~~	~~212~~	10	372
11	Yevhenii Yantsevych (UKR)	B	165	169	171	9	196	200	~~203~~	12	371
12	Cyrille Tchatchet (GBR)	B	~~155~~	155	160	15	195	201	207	11	367
13	Ali Shukurlu (AZE)	B	155	161	166	11	185	195	~~206~~	15	361
14	Artur Mugurdumov (ISR)	B	156	~~160~~	161	13	194	198	~~201~~	14	359
15	Victor Sundh (SWE)	B	146	150	153	16	190	~~196~~	200	13	353
16	Neilas Gineikis (LTU)	B	155	160	~~164~~	14	185	190	~~196~~	16	350
17	Jacob Diakovasilis (DEN)	B	141	146	148	17	180	186	~~192~~	20	334
18	Rebin Rezazadeh (FIN)	B	140	~~145~~	~~146~~	20	184	187	~~195~~	17	327
19	Seamus O'Conchubhair (IRL)	C	140	~~146~~	~~146~~	19	180	186	~~191~~	18	326
20	Þórbergur Ernir Hlynsson (ISL)	C	144	~~148~~	~~150~~	18	173	179	~~183~~	22	323
21	Seppe Housen (BEL)	C	133	~~137~~	~~137~~	22	180	186	~~191~~	19	319
22	Karolis Andrijauskas (LTU)	C	135	~~140~~	~~140~~	21	175	~~180~~	181	21	316
23	Matic Debeljak (SLO)	C	125	130	~~135~~	23	155	161	~~165~~	23	291
—	Irakli Chkheidze (GEO)	A	—	—	—	—	—	—	—	—	—
—	Tudor Ciobanu (MDA)	B	—	—	—	—	—	—	—	—	—
X	Henry Axon (SCO)	C	134	~~138~~	~~140~~	—	170	~~175~~	177	—	311
X	Christoffel Reeders (RSA)	C	~~134~~	~~136~~	138	—	~~168~~	170	~~175~~	—	308
X	Drew Burns (SCO)	C	135	140	143	—	~~172~~	~~172~~	~~172~~	—	—

=== Men's +110 kg ===
Rank	Athlete	Group	Snatch (kg)				Clean & Jerk (kg)				Total
Rank	Athlete	Group	1	2	3	Rank	1	2	3	Rank	Total
1st place, gold medalist(s)	Varazdat Lalayan (ARM)	A	200	210	—	1st place, gold medalist(s)	241	~~253~~	~~253~~	1st place, gold medalist(s)	451
2nd place, silver medalist(s)	Daniil Vagaitsev (AIN)	A	185	190	192	2nd place, silver medalist(s)	225	233	~~240~~	2nd place, silver medalist(s)	425
3rd place, bronze medalist(s)	Timur Naniev (AIN)	A	180	186	191	3rd place, bronze medalist(s)	220	227	~~235~~	4	418
4	Bakari Turmanidze (GEO)	A	175	181	187	4	208	219	~~225~~	5	406
5	Vladyslav Prylypko (UKR)	A	167	171	175	6	218	226	231	3rd place, bronze medalist(s)	406
6	Ragnar Holme (NOR)	A	170	~~170~~	176	5	210	218	~~222~~	6	394
7	Joen Vikingsson Sjöblom (SWE)	A	165	170	174	7	200	205	~~209~~	12	379
8	Kamil Kučera (CZE)	A	165	~~170~~	~~171~~	10	210	~~215~~	~~218~~	8	375
9	Karolis Stonkus (LTU)	B	156	161	~~166~~	14	205	212	~~217~~	7	373
10	Josef Kolář (CZE)	A	157	162	~~166~~	11	200	206	~~213~~	9	368
11	Stanislav Uja (MDA)	A	~~160~~	162	~~167~~	12	195	205	~~210~~	11	367
12	Hugo Ottosson (SWE)	A	153	157	161	15	192	200	206	10	367
13	Ioannis Athanasiou (GRE)	B	161	168	~~171~~	9	191	198	~~210~~	13	366
14	Hanno Keskitalo (FIN)	B	160	166	170	8	185	191	~~195~~	16	361
15	Deivydas Barkus (LTU)	B	156	161	~~166~~	13	192	~~197~~	~~197~~	15	353
16	Georgios Kirvalidze (GRE)	B	154	~~160~~	~~162~~	16	193	~~197~~	~~200~~	14	347
17	Cian Nowlan Rooney (IRL)	B	141	146	150	17	190	~~196~~	~~200~~	17	340
X	Andrew Griffiths (ENG)	B	157	~~161~~	162	—	186	192	~~198~~	—	354
X	Jasper Hilton (ENG)	B	~~145~~	145	~~153~~	—	190	196	~~202~~	—	341
X	James Wales (WAL)	B	140	145	~~150~~	—	190	~~195~~	~~195~~	—	335
X	Omar Keshta (NIR)	B	~~140~~	140	~~145~~	—	176	182	~~186~~	—	322
X	Oliver Dodds (JER)	C	120	125	~~130~~	—	140	148	~~152~~	—	273

== Women's results ==
=== Women's 48 kg ===
Rank	Athlete	Group	Snatch (kg)				Clean & Jerk (kg)				Total
Rank	Athlete	Group	1	2	3	Rank	1	2	3	Rank	Total
1st place, gold medalist(s)	Giulia Imperio (ITA)	A	~~77~~	~~77~~	78	1st place, gold medalist(s)	93	96	98	1st place, gold medalist(s)	176
2nd place, silver medalist(s)	Kateryna Malashchuk (UKR)	A	74	77	~~79~~	3rd place, bronze medalist(s)	92	95	~~98~~	3rd place, bronze medalist(s)	172
3rd place, bronze medalist(s)	Boyana Kostadinova (BUL)	A	74	77	~~79~~	2nd place, silver medalist(s)	92	~~95~~	~~96~~	5	169
4	Ezgi Kılıç (TUR)	A	~~77~~	~~77~~	77	4	~~92~~	92	~~94~~	6	169
5	Marta García (ESP)	A	~~76~~	76	~~78~~	5	89	91	~~94~~	8	167
6	Gamze Altun (TUR)	A	70	~~73~~	~~73~~	10	97	~~99~~	~~99~~	2nd place, silver medalist(s)	167
7	Mara Strzykala (LUX)	B	68	71	~~73~~	9	88	~~90~~	91	7	162
8	Cintia Árva (HUN)	A	69	~~72~~	~~73~~	12	93	~~96~~	~~97~~	4	162
9	Ioana Miron (ROU)	A	70	73	~~75~~	6	85	~~90~~	~~90~~	11	158
10	Sonja Koponen (FIN)	A	66	~~69~~	70	11	84	87	~~89~~	9	157
11	Gabriela Danilov (MDA)	A	~~69~~	69	72	8	~~84~~	~~84~~	84	12	156
12	Ecaterina Grabucea (MDA)	B	60	63	65	13	80	83	85	10	150
13	Lenka Polášková (CZE)	B	53	56	~~58~~	14	73	76	~~79~~	13	132
—	Radmila Zagorac (SRB)	A	72	~~75~~	~~75~~	7	~~90~~	~~90~~	~~91~~	—	—
X	Tammy Wong (ENG)	B	~~69~~	69	~~71~~	—	83	86	88	—	157

=== Women's 53 kg ===
Rank	Athlete	Group	Snatch (kg)				Clean & Jerk (kg)				Total
Rank	Athlete	Group	1	2	3	Rank	1	2	3	Rank	Total
1st place, gold medalist(s)	Nina Sterckx (BEL)	A	88	91	94	2nd place, silver medalist(s)	107	~~112~~	116	1st place, gold medalist(s)	210
2nd place, silver medalist(s)	Mihaela Cambei (ROU)	A	90	~~93~~	95	1st place, gold medalist(s)	110	114	~~117~~	2nd place, silver medalist(s)	209
3rd place, bronze medalist(s)	Cansel Özkan (TUR)	A	90	92	~~95~~	3rd place, bronze medalist(s)	102	104	106	3rd place, bronze medalist(s)	198
4	Rebekka Tao Jacobsen (NOR)	A	~~77~~	77	79	7	~~101~~	102	105	4	184
5	Alexia Sipos (ROU)	A	78	81	~~83~~	4	93	98	~~101~~	10	179
6	Tanzela Grigoryan (ARM)	A	74	78	~~80~~	9	96	~~101~~	101	7	179
7	Milana Kutiakina (AIN)	B	78	~~81~~	~~81~~	8	~~97~~	97	100	8	178
8	Malen Monasterio (ESP)	B	~~79~~	79	~~82~~	6	98	~~102~~	~~102~~	9	177
9	Izabella Yaylyan (ARM)	A	76	80	~~82~~	5	~~95~~	95	~~99~~	13	175
10	Jennifer Tong (GBR)	B	77	~~79~~	~~80~~	10	91	94	~~97~~	14	171
11	Oliwia Drzazga (POL)	B	68	71	73	11	94	97	~~100~~	11	170
12	Kim Camilleri Lagana (MLT)	B	68	70	72	12	92	~~96~~	96	12	168
13	Diana Brogaard (DEN)	C	68	~~71~~	~~71~~	14	87	90	93	15	161
14	Petra Laštovková (CZE)	B	~~68~~	~~68~~	68	15	~~87~~	~~88~~	88	16	156
15	Alina Popescu (MDA)	B	70	~~73~~	~~73~~	13	~~85~~	85	~~88~~	17	155
—	Maria Stratoudaki (GRE)	A	~~83~~	~~83~~	~~83~~	—	~~102~~	~~103~~	105	5	—
—	Alba Sánchez (ESP)	A	~~80~~	~~80~~	~~80~~	—	97	101	~~104~~	6	—
—	Dimitra Ioannou (CYP)	B	~~70~~	~~70~~	~~70~~	—	—	—	—	—	—
—	Serife Ustuner (CYP)	C	~~60~~	—	—	—	—	—	—	—	—
X	Madaline Connelly (WAL)	B	73	~~76~~	~~76~~	—	94	~~97~~	~~97~~	—	167
X	Olivia Bloodworth (NIR)	C	~~65~~	65	68	—	85	~~88~~	88	—	156
X	Noorin Gulam (ENG)	B	~~74~~	~~74~~	~~74~~	—	92	95	~~98~~	—	—

=== Women's 58 kg ===
Rank	Athlete	Group	Snatch (kg)				Clean & Jerk (kg)				Total
Rank	Athlete	Group	1	2	3	Rank	1	2	3	Rank	Total
1st place, gold medalist(s)	Kamila Konotop (UKR)	A	95	98	100	1st place, gold medalist(s)	115	118	121	1st place, gold medalist(s)	221
2nd place, silver medalist(s)	Aleksandra Grigoryan (ARM)	A	88	91	~~93~~	4	115	119	~~124~~	3rd place, bronze medalist(s)	210
3rd place, bronze medalist(s)	Olga Te (AIN)	A	~~93~~	93	~~95~~	3rd place, bronze medalist(s)	112	114	116	4	209
4	Noemi Filippazzo (ITA)	A	90	~~94~~	94	2nd place, silver medalist(s)	105	110	~~113~~	6	204
5	Dana Berchi (ROU)	A	~~88~~	88	~~92~~	5	108	113	~~116~~	5	201
6	Ekaterina Krasulina (AIN)	A	~~87~~	87	~~89~~	6	105	~~110~~	~~110~~	8	192
7	Annelien Vandenabeele (BEL)	B	82	84	86	7	99	102	104	9	190
8	Annika Pilz (GER)	A	83	~~86~~	~~87~~	12	102	~~106~~	106	7	189
9	Maria Połka (POL)	A	~~83~~	83	86	8	102	~~105~~	~~106~~	10	188
10	Veronika Honcharova (AUT)	B	81	84	~~86~~	9	~~99~~	99	~~102~~	11	183
11	Marlous Schuilwerve (NED)	A	~~84~~	84	~~87~~	10	99	~~103~~	~~104~~	12	183
12	Rita Gomez (POR)	B	76	~~80~~	~~80~~	13	93	~~98~~	~~99~~	13	169
13	Margarida Pontes (POR)	B	60	65	~~69~~	14	~~84~~	84	~~91~~	14	149
14	Sarah Durak (BIH)	B	~~54~~	54	57	15	64	67	70	15	127
—	Olha Ivzhenko (UKR)	A	~~97~~	~~98~~	~~98~~	—	114	117	120	2nd place, silver medalist(s)	—
—	Nicoleta Cojocaru (MDA)	A	~~84~~	84	~~89~~	11	~~105~~	~~107~~	~~107~~	—	—
X	Eliza Pratt (ENG)	B	84	87	~~90~~	—	107	~~110~~	~~110~~	—	194
X	Catrin Haf Jones (WAL)	B	~~82~~	~~82~~	82	—	102	105	108	—	190
X	Catherine Ann Jones (WAL)	B	73	76	78	—	~~100~~	~~100~~	100	—	178

=== Women's 63 kg ===
Rank	Athlete	Group	Snatch (kg)				Clean & Jerk (kg)				Total
Rank	Athlete	Group	1	2	3	Rank	1	2	3	Rank	Total
1st place, gold medalist(s)	Sarah Davies (GBR)	A	~~94~~	94	~~99~~	9	120	123	125	1st place, gold medalist(s)	219
2nd place, silver medalist(s)	Alina Shchapanava (AIN)	A	96	~~99~~	~~99~~	6	117	120	122	2nd place, silver medalist(s)	218
3rd place, bronze medalist(s)	Dziyana Maiseyevich (AIN)	A	94	97	~~99~~	5	115	118	120	3rd place, bronze medalist(s)	217
4	Maëlyn Michel (FRA)	A	96	~~99~~	100	1st place, gold medalist(s)	~~115~~	115	~~119~~	8	215
5	Andreea Cotruța (ROU)	A	94	97	99	2nd place, silver medalist(s)	115	~~118~~	~~119~~	7	214
6	Svitlana Moskvina (UKR)	A	93	96	98	3rd place, bronze medalist(s)	113	~~116~~	116	5	214
7	María Olalla (ESP)	B	~~91~~	91	95	7	116	~~121~~	~~121~~	4	211
8	Wiktoria Wołk (POL)	A	90	93	95	8	113	~~117~~	~~117~~	10	208
9	Chiara Piccinno (ITA)	A	~~93~~	93	~~97~~	10	113	~~117~~	~~118~~	11	206
10	Anca Grosu (ROU)	A	~~90~~	90	~~94~~	11	114	~~117~~	~~117~~	9	204
11	Roberta Tabone (MLT)	B	~~85~~	85	87	15	108	111	115	6	202
12	Patricie Gasior (CZE)	A	89	~~92~~	~~92~~	13	108	~~111~~	~~111~~	12	197
13	Katla Björk Ketilsdóttir (ISL)	B	86	89	~~91~~	12	102	~~106~~	106	13	195
14	Paula Zikowsky (AUT)	B	88	~~91~~	~~91~~	14	100	105	~~108~~	15	193
15	Hannah Crymble (IRL)	B	~~85~~	85	~~89~~	17	105	~~110~~	~~111~~	14	190
16	Bibiána Večeřová (SVK)	B	82	~~85~~	85	18	102	~~107~~	~~107~~	17	187
17	Cristina Stanciu (BEL)	C	78	81	~~83~~	20	99	102	104	16	185
18	Tamara Arunović (SRB)	B	85	~~88~~	~~88~~	16	100	~~103~~	~~103~~	18	185
19	Siri Sytelä (FIN)	B	~~79~~	79	82	19	100	~~104~~	~~105~~	19	182
20	Petra Pavlič (SLO)	C	69	73	76	21	89	93	~~96~~	20	169
21	Jekaterina Gritsinina (EST)	C	~~62~~	62	~~65~~	22	82	85	88	21	150
—	Martina Chiacchio (ITA)	A	97	~~99~~	~~101~~	4	~~115~~	~~115~~	~~116~~	—	—
X	Beth Ashbee (SCO)	C	~~85~~	85	88	—	95	100	103	—	191
X	Bethan Watkins (WAL)	C	82	~~84~~	~~84~~	—	102	105	~~108~~	—	187
X	Amelie Pelta (ENG)	B	78	81	84	—	~~103~~	~~103~~	103	—	187
X	Charlotte Whalley (WAL)	B	82	~~85~~	~~85~~	—	99	~~103~~	~~106~~	—	181
X	Megan Stevenson (NIR)	C	70	~~75~~	~~76~~	—	88	91	95	—	165

=== Women's 69 kg ===
Rank	Athlete	Group	Snatch (kg)				Clean & Jerk (kg)				Total
Rank	Athlete	Group	1	2	3	Rank	1	2	3	Rank	Total
1st place, gold medalist(s)	Siuzanna Valodzka (AIN)	A	103	105	108	2nd place, silver medalist(s)	127	129	~~134~~	1st place, gold medalist(s)	237
2nd place, silver medalist(s)	Zarina Gusalova (AIN)	A	103	105	~~108~~	3rd place, bronze medalist(s)	125	~~127~~	127	3rd place, bronze medalist(s)	232
3rd place, bronze medalist(s)	Lisa Schweizer (GER)	A	104	107	109	1st place, gold medalist(s)	118	122	~~125~~	9	231
4	Nuray Güngör (TUR)	A	102	~~105~~	~~106~~	6	~~125~~	~~126~~	126	4	228
5	Naroa Arrasate (ESP)	A	96	98	100	11	125	128	~~132~~	2nd place, silver medalist(s)	228
6	Martyna Dołęga (POL)	A	98	101	103	5	120	~~124~~	124	6	227
7	Enkileda Carja (ALB)	B	100	103	~~105~~	4	121	123	~~125~~	7	226
8	Evgeniia Guseva (AIN)	A	100	~~103~~	~~103~~	9	120	124	~~127~~	5	224
9	Daniela Gherman (ROU)	B	~~90~~	100	~~104~~	8	116	120	~~123~~	11	220
10	Galya Shatova (BUL)	A	97	~~100~~	102	7	~~118~~	118	~~125~~	15	220
11	Erin Barton (GBR)	B	~~92~~	92	95	14	121	~~123~~	123	8	218
12	Viktoriia Lytvynets (UKR)	B	~~94~~	94	96	13	115	118	120	12	216
13	Laurène Fauvel (FRA)	A	95	~~98~~	~~98~~	15	~~117~~	118	121	10	216
14	Guðný Björk Stefánsdóttir (ISL)	A	94	97	~~100~~	12	~~115~~	116	~~122~~	17	213
15	Inka Tiainen (FIN)	B	~~91~~	~~92~~	92	20	~~118~~	118	~~122~~	13	210
16	Antonia Ackermann (GER)	B	90	94	~~96~~	16	115	~~118~~	~~118~~	19	209
17	Tenishia Thornton (MLT)	C	88	90	92	17	~~112~~	112	115	18	207
18	Gina McMonagle (IRL)	C	84	87	90	24	108	112	116	16	206
19	Julia Jordanger Loen (NOR)	B	88	91	~~93~~	22	110	~~113~~	113	20	204
20	Lijana Jakaitė (LTU)	B	89	92	~~94~~	18	111	~~113~~	~~114~~	23	203
21	Despoina Polaktsidou (GRE)	B	89	92	~~95~~	19	~~111~~	~~111~~	111	25	203
22	Myrthe Timmermans (NED)	B	88	91	~~93~~	23	~~111~~	111	~~114~~	24	202
23	Susanne Johansson (SWE)	C	85	88	91	21	102	106	110	26	201
24	Mafalda Monteiro (POR)	C	83	~~86~~	86	26	106	111	~~115~~	22	197
25	Ilona Teittinen (FIN)	C	82	85	~~88~~	27	111	~~114~~	~~117~~	21	196
26	Roos Van Beers (BEL)	C	84	87	~~90~~	25	99	104	~~106~~	27	191
27	Miranda Chutkerashvili (GEO)	C	78	~~81~~	81	29	103	~~106~~	~~107~~	28	184
28	Lucie Minářová (CZE)	C	78	81	82	30	100	~~104~~	~~104~~	29	178
—	Garoa Martínez (ESP)	A	~~96~~	~~96~~	~~98~~	—	118	~~123~~	~~124~~	14	—
—	Giulia Miserendino (ITA)	A	95	100	~~104~~	10	—	—	—	—	—
—	Natália Hušťavová (SVK)	C	81	~~85~~	~~85~~	28	~~100~~	~~100~~	~~100~~	—	—
—	Rachel Monaghan (IRL)	C	~~79~~	~~79~~	~~79~~	—	96	98	100	30	—
X	Madeline Rosher (SCO)	C	91	94	~~97~~	—	111	114	116	—	210
X	Holly O'Shea (GIB)	C	70	74	~~78~~	—	90	~~95~~	95	—	169

=== Women's 77 kg ===
Rank	Athlete	Group	Snatch (kg)				Clean & Jerk (kg)				Total
Rank	Athlete	Group	1	2	3	Rank	1	2	3	Rank	Total
1st place, gold medalist(s)	Janette Ylisoini (FIN)	A	108	111	113	1st place, gold medalist(s)	128	132	134	2nd place, silver medalist(s)	247
2nd place, silver medalist(s)	Varvara Kuzminova (AIN)	B	105	109	112	2nd place, silver medalist(s)	128	132	~~136~~	4	244
3rd place, bronze medalist(s)	Iryna Dombrovska (UKR)	A	~~106~~	106	110	3rd place, bronze medalist(s)	125	130	133	3rd place, bronze medalist(s)	243
4	Anastasia Romanova (AIN)	B	~~103~~	105	108	6	123	128	131	5	239
5	Nana Khorava (GEO)	A	~~103~~	103	109	4	~~121~~	121	127	7	236
6	Genna Toko Kegne (ITA)	A	100	105	~~108~~	7	130	~~135~~	~~137~~	6	235
7	Yekta Jamali (GER)	A	103	~~107~~	~~107~~	9	~~125~~	126	—	9	229
8	Alexandrina Ciubotaru (MDA)	B	99	103	~~106~~	8	124	~~128~~	~~129~~	10	227
9	Lara Dancz (GER)	A	102	106	109	5	115	~~120~~	~~120~~	21	224
10	Nikki Löwik (NED)	B	98	101	~~103~~	10	115	119	122	11	223
11	Celia Gold (ISR)	A	97	~~100~~	~~102~~	15	126	~~129~~	~~131~~	8	223
12	Gintarė Bražaitė (LTU)	B	96	100	~~103~~	11	117	~~121~~	121	14	221
13	Isabella Brown (GBR)	A	99	~~102~~	~~105~~	13	122	~~126~~	—	12	221
14	Alina Sukiasyan (ARM)	A	96	100	~~103~~	12	~~120~~	120	~~125~~	16	220
15	Eliška Šmigová (CZE)	B	93	~~96~~	97	14	117	120	~~125~~	15	217
16	Keilin Coleman (IRL)	C	~~92~~	92	95	17	119	~~122~~	~~123~~	17	214
17	Laura Vest Tolstrup (DEN)	B	91	~~94~~	~~95~~	21	116	~~121~~	121	13	212
18	Simona Jeřábková (CZE)	B	90	94	~~97~~	19	112	117	~~121~~	19	211
19	Maria Karolak (POL)	B	90	93	95	18	112	115	~~117~~	20	210
20	Taika Pirilä (FIN)	C	92	~~95~~	~~95~~	20	113	117	~~120~~	18	209
21	Maria Kireva (BUL)	B	~~96~~	96	~~99~~	16	~~105~~	105	—	23	201
22	Caroline Gernsøe (DEN)	C	86	~~90~~	~~90~~	22	106	110	114	22	200
23	Ivona Gavran (CRO)	C	~~85~~	~~85~~	86	23	~~102~~	102	~~109~~	25	188
24	Anja Rus (SLO)	C	80	82	84	24	95	100	103	24	187
25	Senna Vanmechelen (BEL)	C	~~82~~	82	~~85~~	25	~~101~~	101	~~104~~	26	183
26	Mona Saar (EST)	C	77	80	~~83~~	26	~~96~~	98	~~101~~	27	178
—	Anna Amroyan (ARM)	A	~~102~~	~~102~~	~~104~~	—	125	133	136	1st place, gold medalist(s)	—
X	Madison Farley (ENG)	C	~~88~~	~~90~~	90	—	114	118	121	—	211
X	Agata Herbert (SCO)	C	85	89	91	—	~~105~~	108	112	—	203
X	Abby Meenan (NIR)	C	74	77	~~80~~	—	98	102	~~105~~	—	179
X	Georgia Radley (ENG)	C	~~90~~	90	94	—	~~112~~	~~112~~	~~112~~	—	—
X	Laura Hughes (WAL)	C	~~90~~	90	~~95~~	—	~~118~~	~~118~~	~~119~~	—	—

=== Women's 86 kg ===
Rank	Athlete	Group	Snatch (kg)				Clean & Jerk (kg)				Total
Rank	Athlete	Group	1	2	3	Rank	1	2	3	Rank	Total
1st place, gold medalist(s)	Emma Poghosyan (ARM)	A	102	105	107	3rd place, bronze medalist(s)	132	134	141	1st place, gold medalist(s)	248
2nd place, silver medalist(s)	Iana Sotieva (AIN)	A	106	109	112	1st place, gold medalist(s)	130	~~134~~	135	3rd place, bronze medalist(s)	247
3rd place, bronze medalist(s)	Madias Nzesso (GBR)	A	108	111	~~113~~	2nd place, silver medalist(s)	129	~~132~~	~~133~~	5	240
4	Natia Gadelia (GEO)	A	101	104	106	4	127	131	~~135~~	4	237
5	Liana Gyurjyan (ARM)	A	~~101~~	101	~~105~~	9	130	135	~~141~~	2nd place, silver medalist(s)	236
6	Büşra Çan (TUR)	A	103	~~106~~	~~107~~	7	129	~~133~~	~~133~~	6	232
7	Nikola Seničová (SVK)	A	~~97~~	97	102	8	117	120	125	8	227
8	Darya Kheidzer (AIN)	A	101	104	~~106~~	5	120	~~125~~	~~125~~	10	224
9	Anne Vejsgaard Jensen (DEN)	A	103	~~106~~	~~108~~	6	115	~~118~~	118	12	221
10	Weronika Zielińska (POL)	A	~~95~~	~~95~~	95	12	115	120	124	9	219
11	Eliise Peterson (EST)	B	94	97	100	10	110	115	118	11	218
12	Emma Gleisner (FIN)	B	87	~~90~~	~~90~~	14	~~106~~	109	112	13	199
13	Rita Rodrigues (POR)	B	75	85	90	13	95	105	108	14	198
—	Sara Dal Bò (ITA)	A	100	~~105~~	~~105~~	11	~~126~~	~~127~~	~~127~~	—	—
—	Minni Hormavirta (FIN)	A	~~99~~	~~101~~	~~102~~	—	~~128~~	128	~~133~~	7	—
—	Joyce de Koning (NED)	B	~~98~~	~~98~~	~~98~~	—	~~106~~	106	~~110~~	15	—
X	Kaitlin Saunders (NIR)	B	82	~~85~~	85	—	108	~~111~~	111	—	196
X	Cheyenne Smith (RSA)	B	85	88	~~90~~	—	97	101	~~104~~	—	189
X	Nicola Stiddard (WAL)	B	~~90~~	~~90~~	~~92~~	—	110	115	~~117~~	—	—

=== Women's +86 kg ===
Rank	Athlete	Group	Snatch (kg)				Clean & Jerk (kg)				Total
Rank	Athlete	Group	1	2	3	Rank	1	2	3	Rank	Total
1st place, gold medalist(s)	Emily Campbell (GBR)	A	~~114~~	114	117	3rd place, bronze medalist(s)	151	155	159	1st place, gold medalist(s)	276
2nd place, silver medalist(s)	Solfrid Koanda (NOR)	A	117	119	~~125~~	1st place, gold medalist(s)	148	152	156	2nd place, silver medalist(s)	275
3rd place, bronze medalist(s)	Anastasiia Hotfrid (GEO)	A	115	~~118~~	118	2nd place, silver medalist(s)	135	139	144	4	262
4	Valentyna Kisil (UKR)	B	107	112	116	4	130	135	140	5	256
5	Tuana Süren (TUR)	A	107	~~110~~	111	5	139	143	145	3rd place, bronze medalist(s)	256
6	Fatmagül Çevik (TUR)	A	104	107	110	6	127	131	134	6	244
7	Aurelia Pedersen (DEN)	B	98	103	108	7	123	128	132	9	240
8	Ilke Lagrou (BEL)	A	106	~~110~~	~~110~~	9	128	133	~~139~~	7	239
9	Mariam Murgvliani (GEO)	A	104	~~108~~	108	8	124	130	~~134~~	10	238
10	Alena Bondzikava (AIN)	A	~~105~~	105	~~109~~	11	125	130	~~135~~	11	235
11	Hanna Kalashnyk (UKR)	B	96	99	~~101~~	15	127	132	~~138~~	8	231
12	Tatev Hakobyan (ARM)	A	102	106	~~110~~	10	125	~~133~~	—	15	231
13	Erla Ágústsdóttir (ISL)	B	~~103~~	103	~~106~~	12	120	124	127	13	230
14	Sarah Fischer (AUT)	A	100	~~104~~	~~106~~	14	125	130	~~133~~	12	230
15	Lenka Žembová (SVK)	B	98	102	~~104~~	13	~~123~~	123	126	14	228
16	Anastasia Palic (MDA)	B	92	96	99	16	115	~~120~~	120	16	219
17	Pavlína Šedá (CZE)	B	~~89~~	90	93	17	107	112	114	17	207
18	Viktória Boros (HUN)	B	~~85~~	85	89	18	106	111	~~114~~	18	200

== Controversies ==
After winning bronze, Ukraine's Iryna Dombrovska refused a group photo with a Russian "neutral" athlete, which is a consistent response of Ukrainian athletes to the inclusion of Russian and Belarusian athletes in the international competition while the active phase of war is still ongoing. The move was followed by an emotional outburst from EWF President Astrit Hasani, seen on video yelling at Dombrovska and her coaches and calling the protest "politics".
