= Ivan Dimov (weightlifter) =

Bulgarian weightlifter (born 2002)

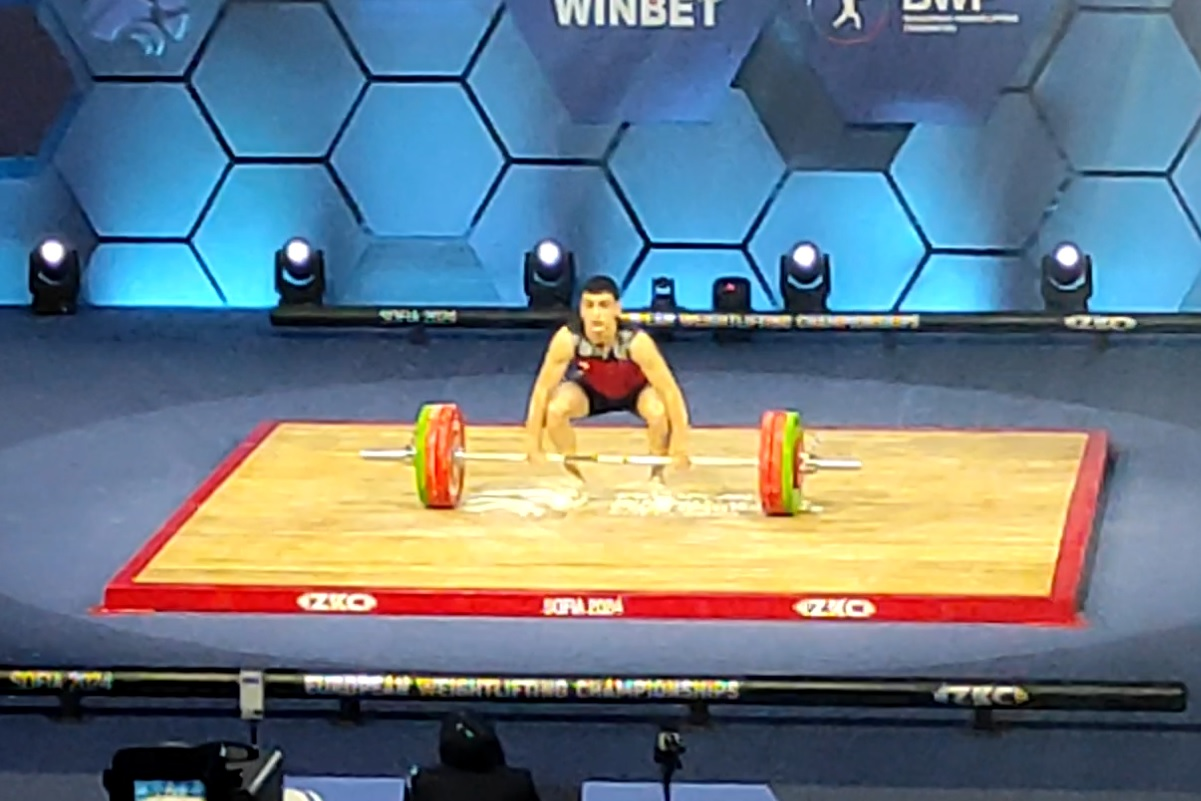

Personal information
- Native name: Иван Петков Димов
- Full name: Ivan Petkov Dimov
- Nationality: Bulgarian
- Born: 4 December 2002 (age 23) Sopot, Bulgaria
- Weight: 67 kg (148 lb)

Sport
- Country: Bulgaria
- Sport: Weightlifting
- Weight class: 65 kg
- Coached by: Petko Dimov
Medal record
Representing Bulgaria
European Championships
Gold medal – first place	2022 Tirana	61 kg
Gold medal – first place	2025 Chișinău	61 kg
Silver medal – second place	2024 Sofia	61 kg
Silver medal – second place	2026 Batumi	65 kg
Bronze medal – third place	2023 Yerevan	61 kg
European Junior & U23 Weightlifting Championships
Bronze medal – third place	2021 Rovaniemi	67 kg
European Youth Weightlifting Championships
Silver medal – second place	2018 San Donato Milanese	50 kg

Ivan Dimov (Bulgarian: Иван Димов; born 4 December 2002) is a Bulgarian weightlifter.

== Career ==
He won the gold medal in the men's 61 kg event at the 2022 European Weightlifting Championships held in Tirana, Albania.

In August 2024, Dimov competed in the men's 61 kg event at the 2024 Summer Olympics held in Paris, France. He failed three attempts to lift 135 kg in the Snatch and he did not compete in the Clean & Jerk. A successful attempt in the Snatch would have placed Dimov in the second position after the lift.

== Major results ==
Year	Venue	Weight	Snatch (kg)				Clean & Jerk (kg)				Total	Rank
Year	Venue	Weight	1	2	3	Rank	1	2	3	Rank	Total	Rank
Summer Olympics
2024	Paris, France	61 kg	~~134~~	~~134~~	~~135~~	—N/a	—	—	—	—N/a	DNF	—
World Championships
2023	Riyadh, Saudi Arabia	61 kg	133	~~136~~	~~137~~	7	152	160	~~164~~	14	293	6
2025	Førde, Norway	65 kg	133	137	~~141~~	2nd place, silver medalist(s)	156	~~163~~	163	8	300	6
2026	Ningbo, China	65 kg	—	—	—	—	—	—	—	—	—	—
IWF World Cup
2024	Phuket, Thailand	67 kg	—	—	—	—	—	—	—	—	—	—
European Championships
2022	Tirana, Albania	61 kg	130	~~133~~	135	1st place, gold medalist(s)	151	~~156~~	~~156~~	4	286	1st place, gold medalist(s)
2023	Yerevan, Armenia	61 kg	123	127	~~130~~	3rd place, bronze medalist(s)	142	147	150	7	277	3rd place, bronze medalist(s)
2024	Sofia, Bulgaria	61 kg	130	~~133~~	~~133~~	1st place, gold medalist(s)	~~150~~	~~150~~	150	3rd place, bronze medalist(s)	280	2nd place, silver medalist(s)
2025	Chișinău, Moldova	61 kg	128	131	135	1st place, gold medalist(s)	150	154	—	1st place, gold medalist(s)	289	1st place, gold medalist(s)
2026	Batumi, Georgia	65 kg	137	141	145	1st place, gold medalist(s)	166	172	~~177~~	2nd place, silver medalist(s)	317	2nd place, silver medalist(s)
