= Sergio Massidda =

Italian weightlifter

Personal information
- Citizenship: Italian
- Born: 26 January 2002 (age 24) Ghilarza, Italy

Sport
- Country: Italy
- Sport: Weightlifting
- Weight class: 61 kg
Medal record
Men's weightlifting
Representing Italy
World Championships
Silver medal – second place	2023 Riyadh	61 kg
European Championships
Silver medal – second place	2023 Yerevan	61 kg
Mediterranean Games
Gold medal – first place	2026 Taranto	65 kg CJ
Bronze medal – third place	2026 Taranto	65 kg S
European U23 Championships
Gold medal – first place	2025 Durres	65 kg

Sergio Massidda (born 26 January 2002) is an Italian weightlifter. He was a silver medalist at the 2023 World Championships.

== Career ==
He won the silver medal in the men's 61 kg event at the 2023 European Weightlifting Championships held in Yerevan, Armenia. He represented Italy at the 2019 World Weightlifting Championships, as well as the 2021 European Championships and 2018 World Championships.

Massidda won the gold medal in the men's 55 kg event at the 2019 Youth World Weightlifting Championships held in Las Vegas, United States.

At the 2021 European Junior & U23 Weightlifting Championships in Rovaniemi, Finland, he won the gold medal in his event.

Massidda won the gold medal in his event at the 2022 European Junior & U23 Weightlifting Championships held in Durrës, Albania.

In August 2024, Massidda competed in the men's 61 kg event at the 2024 Summer Olympics held in Paris, France. He failed three attempts to lift 134 kg in the Snatch and he did not compete in the Clean & Jerk. A successful attempt in the Snatch would have placed Massidda in the second position after the lift.

== Achievements ==
Year	Venue	Weight	Snatch (kg)				Clean & Jerk (kg)				Total	Rank
Year	Venue	Weight	1	2	3	Rank	1	2	3	Rank	Total	Rank
Summer Olympics
2024	Paris, France	61 kg	~~132~~	~~134~~	~~134~~	—N/a	—	—	—	—N/a	DNF	—
World Championships
2018	Ashgabat, Turkmenistan	55 kg	~~105~~	105	~~110~~	8	~~126~~	126	131	8	236	7
2019	Pattaya, Thailand	55 kg	105	109	~~112~~	11	~~130~~	130	135	9	244	9
2022	Bogotá, Colombia	61 kg	~~130~~	~~133~~	135	4	158	~~162~~	~~164~~	8	293	4
2023	Riyadh, Saudi Arabia	61 kg	135	137	~~139~~	2nd place, silver medalist(s)	163	~~165~~	165	7	302	2nd place, silver medalist(s)
2026	Ningbo, China	65 kg	~~130~~	130	~~135~~	16	~~160~~	160	~~165~~	16	290	16
IWF World Cup
2020	Rome, Italy	61 kg	~~110~~	110	~~119~~	8	~~135~~	135	140	7	250	7
2024	Phuket, Thailand	67 kg	140	~~145~~	145	1st place, gold medalist(s)	165	~~170~~	172	3rd place, bronze medalist(s)	317	2nd place, silver medalist(s)
European Championships
2019	(Georgia (country)) Batumi, Georgia	55 kg	~~100~~	100	~~105~~	8	125	~~130~~	~~130~~	7	225	8
2021	Moscow, Russia	61 kg	125	~~130~~	~~130~~	6	145	155	~~160~~	6	280	7
2023	Yerevan, Armenia	61 kg	130	~~134~~	~~137~~	2nd place, silver medalist(s)	~~154~~	154	162	1st place, gold medalist(s)	292	2nd place, silver medalist(s)
2024	Sofia, Bulgaria	67 kg	135	~~140~~	141	2nd place, silver medalist(s)	162	~~167~~	~~167~~	5	304	4
2026	(Georgia (country)) Batumi, Georgia	65 kg	~~140~~	~~141~~	~~141~~	—N/a	165	171	~~176~~	3rd place, bronze medalist(s)	—N/a	—
