= Muhammed Furkan Özbek =

Turkish weightlifter (born 2001)

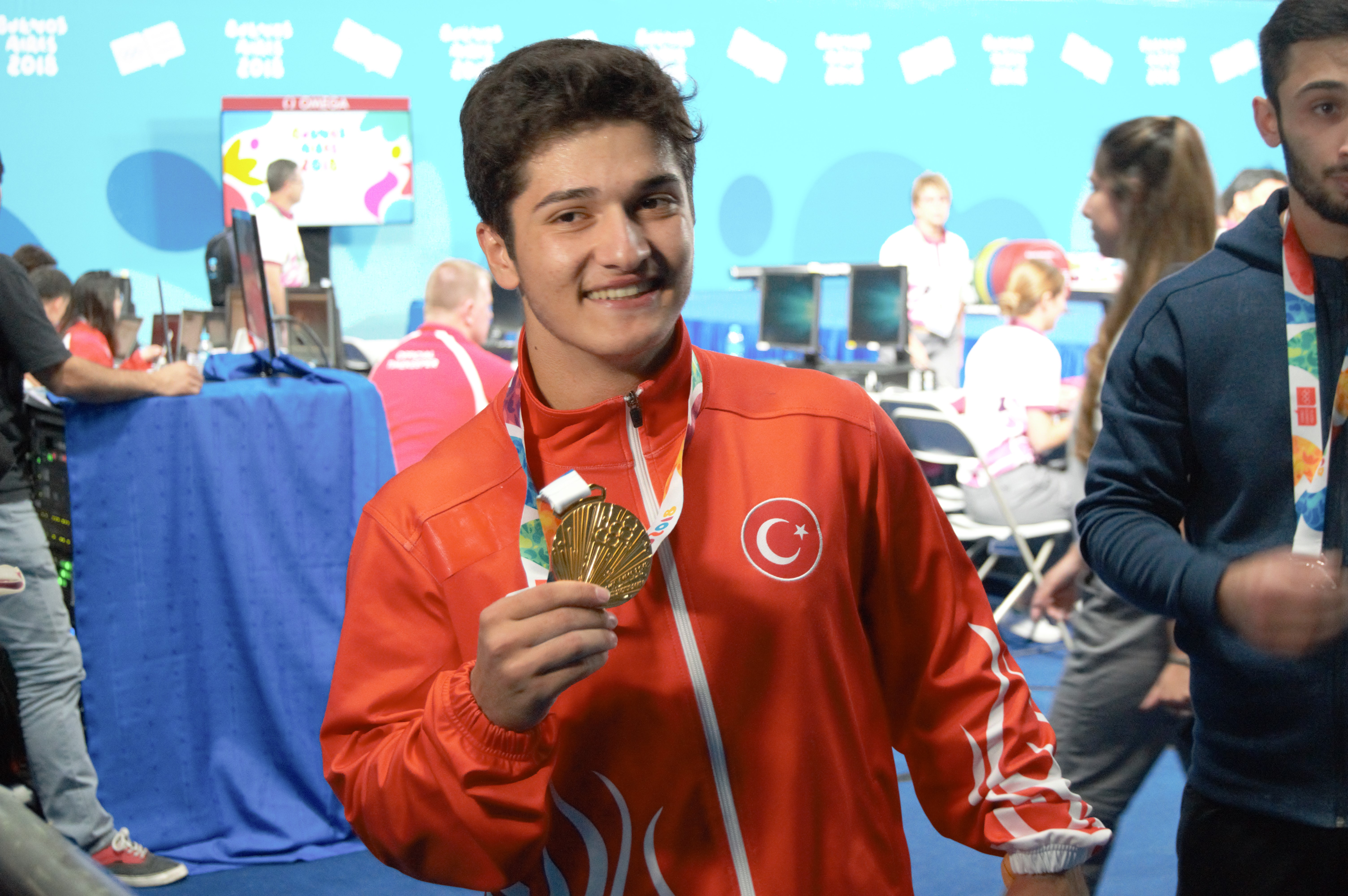
- Muhammed Furkan Özbek in 2018

Personal information
- Born: 24 January 2001 (age 25) Yozgat, Turkey
- Height: 1.63 m (5 ft 4 in)
- Weight: 67 kg (148 lb)

Sport
- Country: Turkey
- Sport: Weightlifting
- Club: Ankara ASKİ
Medal record
Men's weightlifting
Representing Turkey
World Championships
Gold medal – first place	2025 Førde	65 kg
Silver medal – second place	2026 Ningbo	65 kg
Bronze medal – third place	2023 Riyadh	73 kg
European Championships
Gold medal – first place	2021 Moscow	67 kg
Gold medal – first place	2022 Tirana	73 kg
Gold medal – first place	2026 Batumi	65 kg
Silver medal – second place	2024 Sofia	73 kg
Islamic Solidarity Games
Gold medal – first place	2025 Riyadh	65 kg S
Gold medal – first place	2025 Riyadh	65 kg T
Silver medal – second place	2025 Riyadh	65 kg CJ
Mediterranean Games
Silver medal – second place	2022 Oran	73 kg CJ
World Junior Championships
Gold medal – first place	2021 Tashkent	67 kg
Silver medal – second place	2019 Suva	67 kg
Bronze medal – third place	2018 Tashkent	69 kg
European Junior Championships
Gold medal – first place	2019 Bucharest	73 kg
Bronze medal – third place	2017 Durrës	69 kg
Summer Youth Olympics
Gold medal – first place	2018 Buenos Aires	69 kg
European Youth Championships
Gold medal – first place	2018 San Donato	69 kg

Muhammed Furkan Özbek (born 24 January 2001) is a Turkish weightlifter. He won the gold medal in his event at the European Weightlifting Championships in 2021 and 2022.

== Career ==
In 2018, Özbek won the gold medal in the men's youth 69 kg event at the European Youth Weightlifting Championships held in San Donato Milanese, Italy. He also won the gold medal in the 69 kg event at the 2018 Summer Youth Olympics held in Buenos Aires, Argentina.

In 2019, Özbek won the gold medal in the men's junior 73 kg event at the European Junior & U23 Weightlifting Championships in Bucharest, Romania. In 2021, he won the gold medal in his event at the Junior World Weightlifting Championships held in Tashkent, Uzbekistan.

Muhammed Furkan Özbek clinched three medals, including two golds, at the 2021 European Weightlifting Championships held in the Russian capital, Moscow. First won bronze in the men's 67-kilogram weight class at the European Weightlifting Championships. He lifted 145 kilograms in snatch. He then went on to claim two gold medals, lifting 178 kilograms in the clean and jerk, and 323 kilograms in total.

Özbek competed in the men's 67 kg event at the 2020 Summer Olympics in Tokyo, Japan.

Özbek won the gold medal in the men's 73 kg event at the 2022 European Weightlifting Championships held in Tirana, Albania. He lifted 149 kilograms in snatch, 190 kilograms in the clean and jerk, and 339 kilograms in total. He won the silver medal in the men's 73 kg Clean & Jerk event at the 2022 Mediterranean Games held in Oran, Algeria.

In August 2024, Özbek competed in the men's 73 kg event at the 2024 Summer Olympics held in Paris, France. He lifted 341 kg in total and placed fourth missing 3 kg out on medal position.

Muhammed Furkan Özbek won the gold medal and became world champion in the men's 65 kg category at the 2025 World Weightlifting Championships held in Førde, Norway in October 2025. According to the Turkish Weightlifting Federation, Özbek lifted 145 kg in the snatch to win the gold medal and set a world record with a total of 324 kg. With this result, Turkey won the world championship again after 15 years. In the clean and jerk, he lifted 179 kg and won the silver medal.

== Achievements ==
Year	Venue	Weight	Snatch (kg)				Clean & Jerk (kg)				Total	Rank
Year	Venue	Weight	1	2	3	Rank	1	2	3	Rank	Total	Rank
Olympic Games
2021	Tokyo, Japan	67 kg	142	~~145~~	~~145~~	—N/a	~~173~~	~~173~~	~~173~~	—N/a	DNF	—
2024	Paris, France	73 kg	150	~~153~~	~~155~~	—N/a	~~189~~	~~191~~	191	—N/a	341	4
World Championships
2019	Pattaya, Thailand	67 kg	138	~~141~~	~~141~~	14	171	~~174~~	~~174~~	10	309	14
2022	Bogotá, Colombia	73 kg	~~145~~	145	~~145~~	15	~~186~~	186	~~191~~	5	331	8
2023	Riyadh, Saudi Arabia	73 kg	143	~~146~~	147	11	185	187	~~191~~	3rd place, bronze medalist(s)	334	3rd place, bronze medalist(s)
2025	Førde, Norway	65 kg	140	143	145 ER	1st place, gold medalist(s)	173	176	179 ER	2nd place, silver medalist(s)	324 WR	1st place, gold medalist(s)
2026	Ningbo, China	65 kg	142	145	147	2nd place, silver medalist(s)	175	179	183	3rd place, bronze medalist(s)	330	2nd place, silver medalist(s)
IWF World Cup
2024	Phuket, Thailand	73 kg	148	150	152	11	186	~~189~~	189	6	341	7
European Championships
2019	Batumi, Georgia	73 kg	140	145	~~148~~	8	174	180	~~184~~	5	325	5
2021	Moscow, Russia	67 kg	139	142	145	3rd place, bronze medalist(s)	170	174	178	1st place, gold medalist(s)	323	1st place, gold medalist(s)
2022	Tirana, Albania	73 kg	145	~~148~~	149	3rd place, bronze medalist(s)	178	181	190	1st place, gold medalist(s)	339	1st place, gold medalist(s)
2023	Yerevan, Armenia	73 kg	140	143	146	8	181	~~186~~	~~187~~	6	327	7
2024	Sofia, Bulgaria	73 kg	145	148	150	6	~~185~~	~~185~~	186	2nd place, silver medalist(s)	336	2nd place, silver medalist(s)
2025	Chișinău, Moldova	73 kg	~~147~~	~~147~~	~~148~~	—	186	192	~~195~~	2nd place, silver medalist(s)	—	—
2026	Batumi, Georgia	65 kg	140	143	~~146~~	2nd place, silver medalist(s)	170	175	180 ER	1st place, gold medalist(s)	323	1st place, gold medalist(s)
Islamic Solidarity Games
2025	Riyadh, Saudi Arabia	65 kg	~~138~~	138	140	1st place, gold medalist(s)	~~170~~	170	—	2nd place, silver medalist(s)	310	1st place, gold medalist(s)
Mediterranean Games
2022	Oran, Algeria	73 kg	~~145~~	145	~~148~~	5	~~181~~	181	184	2nd place, silver medalist(s)	—	—
World Junior Championships
2018	Tashkent, Uzbekistan	69 kg	133	136	138	2nd place, silver medalist(s)	164	168	~~171~~	3rd place, bronze medalist(s)	306	3rd place, bronze medalist(s)
2019	Suva, Fiji	67 kg	~~135~~	~~135~~	135	3rd place, bronze medalist(s)	166	170	172	2nd place, silver medalist(s)	307	2nd place, silver medalist(s)
2021	Tashkent, Uzbekistan	67 kg	138	141	~~147~~	1st place, gold medalist(s)	170	173	176	2nd place, silver medalist(s)	317	1st place, gold medalist(s)
European Junior Championships
2017	Durrës, Albania	69 kg	128	132	135	4	162	~~168~~	~~168~~	2nd place, silver medalist(s)	297	3rd place, bronze medalist(s)
2019	Bucharest, Romania	73 kg	140	144	148	1st place, gold medalist(s)	170	177	181 EJR	1st place, gold medalist(s)	329 EJR	1st place, gold medalist(s)
Summer Youth Olympics
2018	Buenos Aires, Argentina	69 kg	132	~~135~~	135	—N/a	158	165	170	—N/a	317	1st place, gold medalist(s)
Youth World Championships
2016	Penang, Malaysia	69 kg	123	~~126~~	~~126~~	7	150	156	~~161~~	6	279	7
European Youth Championships
2017	Pristina, Kosovo	69 kg	~~127~~	128	~~132~~	5	156	162	~~171~~	2nd place, silver medalist(s)	290	4
2018	San Donato Milanese, Italy	69 kg	128	134	136	2nd place, silver medalist(s)	157	163	~~169~~	1st place, gold medalist(s)	299	1st place, gold medalist(s)
