= South African Weightlifting Federation =

Sports governing body in South Africa

- Sport: Weightlifting
- Abbreviation: SAWF
- Founded: 1946
- Affiliation: International Weightlifting Federation
- Regional affiliation: Weightlifting Federation of Africa
- Headquarters: Edenvale, Gauteng
- Location: 4 Engwena Road, Edenvale, Gauteng
- President: Caroline Wolf
- Secretary: Antoinette Kiel

Official website
- www.saweightlifting.co.za
- (South Africa)

The South African Weightlifting Federation (SAWF) is the national governing body that oversees the sport of Olympic weightlifting in South Africa. Established in 1946, the federation is a member of the International Weightlifting Federation and the Commonwealth Weightlifting Federation. SAWF is also affiliated to the African regional governing body Weightlifting Federation of Africa, and SASCOC. It organizes national championships and its weightlifters compete regularly at the African Weightlifting Championships.

== History ==
Weightlifting as a sport began in the 1930s in South Africa. South African Weightlifting Federation (formerly South African Amateur Weightlifting Union) became affiliated to the International Weightlifting Federation (IWF) (formerly the Fédération Haltéphile International (FHI)), in 1946. Two South African weightlifters participated in the 1948 Summer Olympics held in London.

Due to the apartheid policy by the government, South Africa was expelled from competing in international competitions by the IWF in 1969.

A unification meeting between the racially divided weightlifting governing bodies, South African Amateur Weightlifting Union (SAAWU) and South African Amateur Weightlifting and Bodybuilding Federation (SAAWBF) was held on 14 September 1991, in Cape Town resulting in the formation of one controlling body named South African Weightlifting Federation, leading to a return to the IWF. A delegation from South Africa later attended the 1991 IWF Congress held in Donaueschingen where it was officially readmitted.

== See also ==
- Sports in South Africa
