= Ferdi Hardal =

Turkish weightlifter (born 1996)

Personal information
- Born: 31 December 1996 (age 29) Tokat, Turkey
- Education: Tokat Gaziosmanpaşa University
- Height: 1.65 m (5 ft 5 in)
- Weight: 67 kg (148 lb)

Sport
- Country: Turkey
- Sport: Weightlifting
- Club: Gaziantep GSİM
Medal record
Men's weightlifting
Representing Turkey
European Championships
Bronze medal – third place	2019 Batumi	61 kg
Bronze medal – third place	2021 Moscow	61 kg
Bronze medal – third place	2024 Sofia	67 kg
Bronze medal – third place	2025 Chisinau	67 kg
Bronze medal – third place	2026 Batumi	65 kg
Islamic Solidarity Games
Bronze medal – third place	2021 Konya	61 kg S
Mediterranean Games
Gold medal – first place	2022 Oran	61 kg S
Gold medal – first place	2022 Oran	61 kg CJ
Silver medal – second place	2026 Taranto	65 kg S
Bronze medal – third place	2026 Taranto	65 kg CJ

Ferdi Hardal (born 31 December 1996) is a Turkish weightlifter competing in the 67 kg division. He obtained a quota for the 2020 Summer Olympics.

== Sport career ==
Hardal is a member of Gaziantep GSİM Club.

He won two bronze medals in the 56 kg Clean & Jerk event and in Total events of the 2014 European Junior & U23 Championships in Limassol, Cyprus, two silver medals in the 62 kg Snatch event and in Total of the 2016 European Junior & U23 Championships in Eilat, Israel, the silver medal in the 62 kg Clean & Jerk event of the 2017 European Junior & U23 Championships in Durrës, Albania, the gold medal in 62 kg Snatch, the bronze medal in the Clean & Jerk event, the silver medal in Totak of the 2018 European Junior & U23 Championships in Zamość, Poland, and the silver medal in the 61 kg Snatch event of the 2019 European Junior & U23 Championships in Bucharest, Romania.

He competed at the 2018 World Championships in Ashgabat, Turkmenistan, and at the 2019 World Championships in Pattaya, Thailand.

At the 2019 European Championships in Batumi, Georgia, he took the bronze medal in the 61 kg Snatch, the silver medal in Clean & Jerk and the bronze medal in Total. He won the bronze medal at the 2021 European Championships in Moscow, Russia.

Hardal obtained a quota for the 2020 Summer Olympics.

He won the gold medal in the men's 61 kg Snatch and Clean & Jerk events at the 2022 Mediterranean Games held in Oran, Algeria.

Ferdi Hardal finished third in Europe at the 2025 European Weightlifting Championships in Chisinau, Moldova, in the men's 67 kg category, winning the silver medal with 140 kg in the snatch, the bronze medal with 165 kg in the clean & jerk and the bronze medal with 305 kg in total.
