= 2023 Youth World Weightlifting Championships =

Weightlifting competition in Albania

- Venue: Ramazan Njala Sports Palace
- Location: Durrës, Albania
- Dates: 25 March – 1 April
- Competitors: 264 from 56 nations

The 2023 Youth World Weightlifting Championships was a weightlifting competition held from 25 March to 1 April in Durrës, Albania.

== Medals tables ==
Ranking by Big (Total result) medals

* Host nation (Albania)

Rank	Nation	Gold	Silver	Bronze	Total
1	Turkey	3	2	1	6
2	Philippines	2	3	0	5
3	Georgia	2	2	0	4
3	Kazakhstan	2	2	0	4
5	Turkmenistan	2	1	0	3
6	Thailand	2	0	0	2
7	Egypt	1	2	0	3
8	Armenia	1	1	4	6
9	Canada	1	1	1	3
10	Vietnam	1	0	2	3
11	Chinese Taipei	1	0	1	2
11	Colombia	1	0	1	2
13	United States	1	0	0	1
14	India	0	1	4	5
15	South Korea	0	1	1	2
16	Azerbaijan	0	1	0	1
16	Ecuador	0	1	0	1
16	Italy	0	1	0	1
16	Saudi Arabia	0	1	0	1
20	Albania*	0	0	1	1
20	Greece	0	0	1	1
20	Poland	0	0	1	1
20	Uzbekistan	0	0	1	1
20	Venezuela	0	0	1	1
Totals (24 entries)		20	20	20	60

Ranking by all medals: Big (Total result) and Small (Snatch and Clean & Jerk)

* Host nation (Albania)

Rank	Nation	Gold	Silver	Bronze	Total
1	Turkey	7	6	4	17
2	Kazakhstan	7	5	2	14
3	Philippines	7	4	1	12
4	Turkmenistan	6	3	1	10
5	Thailand	6	0	0	6
6	Georgia	4	8	0	12
7	Egypt	4	4	2	10
8	Canada	4	2	3	9
9	Vietnam	3	3	4	10
10	Chinese Taipei	3	0	2	5
11	Armenia	2	2	11	15
12	Colombia	2	2	2	6
13	United States	2	1	0	3
14	Saudi Arabia	1	2	0	3
15	Uzbekistan	1	0	2	3
16	Syria	1	0	1	2
17	India	0	4	10	14
18	Italy	0	3	1	4
19	Azerbaijan	0	3	0	3
19	Ecuador	0	3	0	3
21	South Korea	0	2	5	7
22	Greece	0	1	1	2
23	Finland	0	1	0	1
23	Nauru	0	1	0	1
25	Albania*	0	0	2	2
25	Venezuela	0	0	2	2
27	Mexico	0	0	1	1
27	Moldova	0	0	1	1
27	Poland	0	0	1	1
27	Romania	0	0	1	1
Totals (30 entries)		60	60	60	180

== Team ranking ==
=== Men ===
Rank	Team	Points
1	Armenia	536
2	India	393
3	Kazakhstan	369
4	United States	355
5	Georgia	352
6	Vietnam	338

=== Women ===
Rank	Team	Points
1	Egypt	591
2	United States	418
3	India	413
4	Canada	383
5	Kazakhstan	376
6	Chinese Taipei	351

== Medal overview ==
=== Men ===
Event	Gold		Silver		Bronze	
49 kg
Snatch	Prince Delos Santos; Philippines	92 kg	Dhanush Loganathan; India	88 kg	Eron Borres; Philippines	87 kg
Clean & Jerk	Eron Borres; Philippines	114 kg	Prince Delos Santos; Philippines	113 kg	Dhanush Loganathan; India	112 kg
Total	Prince Delos Santos; Philippines	205 kg	Eron Borres; Philippines	201 kg	Dhanush Loganathan; India	200 kg
55 kg
Snatch	K'Dương; Vietnam	114 kg YWR	A Tiêu; Vietnam	106 kg	N Tomchou Meetei; India	103 kg
Clean & Jerk	K'Dương; Vietnam	144 kg YWR	N Tomchou Meetei; India	131 kg	Burak Aykun; Turkey	125 kg
Total	K'Dương; Vietnam	258 kg YWR	N Tomchou Meetei; India	234 kg	Burak Aykun; Turkey	227 kg
61 kg
Snatch	Perhat Bagtyýarow; Turkmenistan	114 kg	K'Brừm; Vietnam	113 kg	Tinku Golom; India	112 kg
Clean & Jerk	Albert Delos Santos; Philippines	149 kg	Perhat Bagtyýarow; Turkmenistan	144 kg	K'Brừm; Vietnam	142 kg
Total	Albert Delos Santos; Philippines	259 kg	Perhat Bagtyýarow; Turkmenistan	258 kg	K'Brừm; Vietnam	255 kg
67 kg
Snatch	Seryozha Barseghyan; Armenia	128 kg	Mohammed Al-Marzouq; Saudi Arabia	121 kg	Nurasyl Arapbay; Kazakhstan	120 kg
Clean & Jerk	Mohammed Al-Marzouq; Saudi Arabia	149 kg	Ditto Ika; Nauru	149 kg	Bharali Bedabrate; India	148 kg
Total	Seryozha Barseghyan; Armenia	275 kg	Mohammed Al-Marzouq; Saudi Arabia	270 kg	Bharali Bedabrate; India	267 kg
73 kg
Snatch	Yerasyl Saulebekov; Kazakhstan	137 kg	Ravin Almammadov; Azerbaijan	136 kg	Park Ju-hyeon; South Korea	131 kg
Clean & Jerk	Yerasyl Saulebekov; Kazakhstan	168 kg	Ravin Almammadov; Azerbaijan	167 kg	Narek Mkrtchyan; Armenia	158 kg
Total	Yerasyl Saulebekov; Kazakhstan	305 kg	Ravin Almammadov; Azerbaijan	303 kg	Park Ju-hyeon; South Korea	289 kg
81 kg
Snatch	Diyorbek Ermatov; Uzbekistan	145 kg	Levan Ochigava; Georgia	143 kg	Kwon Dae-hee; South Korea	142 kg
Clean & Jerk	Levan Ochigava; Georgia	179 kg	Kwon Dae-hee; South Korea	174 kg	Diyorbek Ermatov; Uzbekistan	169 kg
Total	Levan Ochigava; Georgia	322 kg	Kwon Dae-hee; South Korea	316 kg	Diyorbek Ermatov; Uzbekistan	314 kg
89 kg
Snatch	Nurdos Sabyr; Kazakhstan	145 kg	Kerem Kurnaz; Turkey	144 kg	Valerik Movsisyan; Armenia	140 kg
Clean & Jerk	Kerem Kurnaz; Turkey	183 kg	Nurdos Sabyr; Kazakhstan	176 kg	Ahmad Shammaa; Syria	171 kg
Total	Kerem Kurnaz; Turkey	327 kg	Nurdos Sabyr; Kazakhstan	321 kg	Valerik Movsisyan; Armenia	306 kg
96 kg
Snatch	Sami Baki Kıymet; Turkey	145 kg	Simone Abati; Italy	144 kg	Ashot Margaryan; Armenia	137 kg
Clean & Jerk	Sami Baki Kıymet; Turkey	180 kg	Simone Abati; Italy	173 kg	Ashot Margaryan; Armenia	163 kg
Total	Sami Baki Kıymet; Turkey	325 kg	Simone Abati; Italy	317 kg	Ashot Margaryan; Armenia	300 kg
102 kg
Snatch	Nikita Abdrakhmanov; Kazakhstan	164 kg	Saba Adamia; Georgia	137 kg	Cristian Grijalva; Mexico	137 kg
Clean & Jerk	Nikita Abdrakhmanov; Kazakhstan	205 kg	Saba Adamia; Georgia	168 kg	So I-jun; South Korea	167 kg
Total	Nikita Abdrakhmanov; Kazakhstan	369 kg	Saba Adamia; Georgia	305 kg	Marcin Ziółkowski; Poland	302 kg
+ 102 kg
Snatch	Ali Mohammad; Syria	147 kg	Irakli Vekua; Georgia	141 kg	Gagik Mkrtchyan; Armenia	139 kg
Clean & Jerk	Irakli Vekua; Georgia	179 kg	Gagik Mkrtchyan; Armenia	174 kg	Wang Yu-cheng; Chinese Taipei	172 kg
Total	Irakli Vekua; Georgia	320 kg	Gagik Mkrtchyan; Armenia	313 kg	Wang Yu-cheng; Chinese Taipei	310 kg

=== Women ===
Event		Gold		Silver		Bronze	
– 40 kg	Snatch	Ivy Buzinhani (CAN)	53 kg	Jyoshna Sabar (IND)	53 kg	Melek Yağmur Şahin (TUR)	53 kg
– 40 kg	Clean & Jerk	Ivy Buzinhani (CAN)	67 kg	Melek Yağmur Şahin (TUR)	66 kg	Basma Gunaidy (EGY)	66 kg
– 40 kg	Total	Ivy Buzinhani (CAN)	120 kg	Melek Yağmur Şahin (TUR)	119 kg	Jyoshna Sabar (IND)	115 kg
– 45 kg	Snatch	Angeline Colonia (PHI)	72 kg	Ogulşat Amanowa (TKM)	71 kg	Akanksha Vyavahare (IND)	68 kg
– 45 kg	Clean & Jerk	Ogulşat Amanowa (TKM)	85 kg	Lawren Estrada (COL)	84 kg	Asmita Dhone (IND)	83 kg
– 45 kg	Total	Ogulşat Amanowa (TKM)	156 kg	Angeline Colonia (PHI)	155 kg	Akanksha Vyavahare (IND)	150 kg
– 49 kg	Snatch	Pan Hsing-chen (TPE)	73 kg	Habiba Abdel Fattah (EGY)	69 kg	Nicoleta Cojocaru (MDA)	68 kg
– 49 kg	Clean & Jerk	Pan Hsing-chen (TPE)	90 kg	Maria Stratoudaki (GRE)	86 kg	Alexia Şipoş (ROU)	84 kg
– 49 kg	Total	Pan Hsing-chen (TPE)	163 kg	Habiba Abdel Fattah (EGY)	152 kg	Maria Stratoudaki (GRE)	152 kg
– 55 kg	Snatch	Gelen Torres (COL)	82 kg	Emily Ibanez (CAN)	79 kg	Darya Balabayuk (KAZ)	78 kg
– 55 kg	Clean & Jerk	Rosalinda Faustino (PHI)	100 kg	Gelen Torres (COL)	100 kg	Emily Ibanez (CAN)	98 kg
– 55 kg	Total	Gelen Torres (COL)	182 kg	Rosalinda Faustino (PHI)	178 kg	Emily Ibanez (CAN)	177 kg
– 59 kg	Snatch	Medine Amanowa (TKM)	90 kg	Jessica Palacios (ECU)	88 kg	Enkileda Carja (ALB)	87 kg
– 59 kg	Clean & Jerk	Medine Amanowa (TKM)	109 kg	Jessica Palacios (ECU)	107 kg	Greta De Riso (ITA)	101 kg
– 59 kg	Total	Medine Amanowa (TKM)	199 kg	Jessica Palacios (ECU)	195 kg	Enkileda Carja (ALB)	187 kg
– 64 kg	Snatch	Thanaporn Saetia (THA)	93 kg	Taissiya Alexeyeva (KAZ)	89 kg	Gülälek Kakamyradowa (TKM)	88 kg
– 64 kg	Clean & Jerk	Thanaporn Saetia (THA)	113 kg	Taissiya Alexeyeva (KAZ)	112 kg	Ingrid Segura (COL)	108 kg
– 64 kg	Total	Thanaporn Saetia (THA)	206 kg	Taissiya Alexeyeva (KAZ)	201 kg	Ingrid Segura (COL)	194 kg
– 71 kg	Snatch	Phattharathida Wongsing (THA)	92 kg	Anna Ylisoini (FIN)	91 kg	Burcu Gerçekden (TUR)	88 kg
– 71 kg	Clean & Jerk	Phattharathida Wongsing (THA)	120 kg	Burcu Gerçekden (TUR)	113 kg	Keily Silva (VEN)	112 kg
– 71 kg	Total	Phattharathida Wongsing (THA)	212 kg	Burcu Gerçekden (TUR)	201 kg	Keily Silva (VEN)	199 kg
– 76 kg	Snatch	Ella Nicholson (USA)	101 kg	Rahma El-Sayed (EGY)	99 kg	Rinad Hassan (EGY)	91 kg
– 76 kg	Clean & Jerk	Rahma El-Sayed (EGY)	122 kg	Ella Nicholson (USA)	121 kg	Chun Yoo-been (KOR)	116 kg
– 76 kg	Total	Ella Nicholson (USA)	222 kg	Rahma El-Sayed (EGY)	221 kg	Anna Amroyan (ARM)	204 kg
– 81 kg	Snatch	Shams Abdel Azim (EGY)	103 kg	Mariam Murgvliani (GEO)	102 kg	Emma Poghosyan (ARM)	98 kg
– 81 kg	Clean & Jerk	Shams Abdel Azim (EGY)	129 kg	Mariam Murgvliani (GEO)	127 kg	Emma Poghosyan (ARM)	123 kg
– 81 kg	Total	Shams Abdel Azim (EGY)	232 kg YWR	Mariam Murgvliani (GEO)	229 kg	Emma Poghosyan (ARM)	221 kg
+ 81 kg	Snatch	Tuana Süren (TUR)	104 kg	Trần Thị Hiền (VIE)	96 kg	Etta Love (CAN)	95 kg
+ 81 kg	Clean & Jerk	Etta Love (CAN)	130 kg	Tuana Süren (TUR)	126 kg	Trần Thị Hiền (VIE)	124 kg
+ 81 kg	Total	Tuana Süren (TUR)	230 kg	Etta Love (CAN)	225 kg	Trần Thị Hiền (VIE)	220 kg

== Participating nations ==
- Albania (5)
- Armenia (11)
- Australia (6)
- Austria (1)
- Azerbaijan (3)
- Belgium (2)
- Brazil (1)
- Bulgaria (4)
- Canada (8)
- Chile (3)
- Chinese Taipei (12)
- Colombia (5)
- Croatia (1)
- Czech Republic (1)
- Ecuador (3)
- Egypt (12)
- Estonia (2)
- Finland (2)
- France (3)
- Georgia (6)
- Great Britain (2)
- Greece (4)
- Hungary (4)
- India (13)
- Israel (1)
- Italy (5)
- Japan (3)
- Kazakhstan (11)
- Kosovo (1)
- Kyrgyzstan (1)
- Malta (1)
- Mexico (1)
- Moldova (2)
- Nauru (6)
- New Zealand (2)
- Philippines (5)
- Poland (9)
- Puerto Rico (1)
- Qatar (1)
- Romania (5)
- Saudi Arabia (7)
- Slovakia (2)
- Slovenia (1)
- South Korea (5)
- Spain (3)
- Sri Lanka (3)
- Syria (3)
- Thailand (5)
- Tunisia (4)
- Turkey (8)
- Turkmenistan (9)
- Ukraine (12)
- United States (17)
- Uzbekistan (3)
- Venezuela (5)
- Vietnam (8)

== Men's results ==
=== 49 kg ===
Rank	Athlete	Group	Snatch (kg)				Clean & Jerk (kg)				Total
Rank	Athlete	Group	1	2	3	Rank	1	2	3	Rank	Total
1st place, gold medalist(s)	Prince Delos Santos (PHI)	A	87	90	92	1st place, gold medalist(s)	108	111	113	2nd place, silver medalist(s)	205
2nd place, silver medalist(s)	Eron Borres (PHI)	A	~~87~~	87	~~91~~	3rd place, bronze medalist(s)	110	~~114~~	114	1st place, gold medalist(s)	201
3rd place, bronze medalist(s)	Dhanush Loganathan (IND)	A	82	85	88	2nd place, silver medalist(s)	103	108	112	3rd place, bronze medalist(s)	200
4	Bùi Minh Đạo (VIE)	A	~~86~~	86	~~89~~	4	107	~~109~~	109	4	195
5	Hoshina Ameku (JPN)	A	85	~~88~~	~~90~~	5	94	98	~~100~~	9	183
6	Narcis Papolți (ROU)	A	80	~~85~~	~~85~~	8	90	95	100	7	180
7	Danil Li (KAZ)	A	78	~~81~~	~~81~~	9	97	~~101~~	102	5	180
8	Nurbek Azamatow (TKM)	A	80	84	~~88~~	6	95	~~100~~	~~100~~	10	179
9	Yilver Grijalba (COL)	A	78	~~81~~	81	7	93	~~97~~	~~97~~	11	174
10	Tufail (IND)	B	69	~~72~~	72	11	93	97	101	6	173
11	Nathapon Kijwanichniyom (THA)	B	~~71~~	71	74	10	91	94	98	8	172
12	Isus Kirilov (BUL)	B	70	~~73~~	~~73~~	12	91	~~93~~	~~94~~	12	161
13	Johannes Adam (NRU)	B	~~65~~	68	70	13	78	~~81~~	~~81~~	14	148
14	Andreas Veseli (GRE)	B	60	~~65~~	~~65~~	14	76	80	83	13	143

=== 55 kg ===
Rank	Athlete	Group	Snatch (kg)				Clean & Jerk (kg)				Total
Rank	Athlete	Group	1	2	3	Rank	1	2	3	Rank	Total
1st place, gold medalist(s)	K'Dương (VIE)	A	~~107~~	107	114	1st place, gold medalist(s)	132	~~144~~	144	1st place, gold medalist(s)	258
2nd place, silver medalist(s)	Meetei N Tomchou (IND)	A	97	101	103	3rd place, bronze medalist(s)	123	127	131	2nd place, silver medalist(s)	234
3rd place, bronze medalist(s)	Burak Aykun (TUR)	A	97	100	102	4	125	~~129~~	~~129~~	3rd place, bronze medalist(s)	227
4	Guru Sanapathi (IND)	A	98	~~102~~	~~104~~	6	125	~~130~~	~~130~~	4	223
5	A Tiêu (VIE)	A	103	106	~~108~~	2nd place, silver medalist(s)	116	~~120~~	~~121~~	7	222
6	Nino Simeonov (BUL)	A	~~95~~	95	97	7	115	~~116~~	~~116~~	8	212
7	Daniz Jabbarli (AZE)	A	~~92~~	~~92~~	92	8	113	~~116~~	~~119~~	9	205
8	Ayad El-Tantawy (EGY)	B	87	~~90~~	~~90~~	10	108	114	117	6	204
9	Wutthiphong Chomkhunthod (THA)	B	89	91	~~94~~	9	106	109	~~115~~	10	200
10	Ali Al-Hawar (KSA)	B	78	~~82~~	83	11	97	~~102~~	102	11	185
11	Yu Hung-i (TPE)	B	78	82	~~84~~	12	98	101	~~104~~	12	183
12	Venura Kariyawasam (SRI)	B	78	~~82~~	~~82~~	13	98	~~102~~	~~103~~	13	176
13	Hung Chun-hsi (TPE)	B	70	75	77	14	90	95	~~100~~	14	172
14	Panagiotis Spyrou (GRE)	B	63	66	69	15	83	87	91	15	160
—	Mahmoud Jebali (TUN)	A	96	99	~~102~~	5	~~120~~	~~120~~	~~120~~	—	—
—	Kento Kousaka (JPN)	A	~~95~~	~~95~~	~~95~~	—	~~115~~	115	120	5	—
—	Ilir Beka (KOS)	B	~~45~~	~~45~~	~~45~~	—	47	~~48~~	~~48~~	16	—

=== 61 kg ===
Rank	Athlete	Group	Snatch (kg)				Clean & Jerk (kg)				Total
Rank	Athlete	Group	1	2	3	Rank	1	2	3	Rank	Total
1st place, gold medalist(s)	Albert Delos Santos (PHI)	A	105	~~110~~	110	5	143	147	149	1st place, gold medalist(s)	259
2nd place, silver medalist(s)	Perhat Bagtyýarow (TKM)	A	110	114	~~117~~	1st place, gold medalist(s)	140	144	~~146~~	2nd place, silver medalist(s)	258
3rd place, bronze medalist(s)	K'Brừm (VIE)	A	108	111	113	2nd place, silver medalist(s)	136	~~142~~	142	3rd place, bronze medalist(s)	255
4	Tinku Golom (IND)	A	105	109	112	3rd place, bronze medalist(s)	135	~~139~~	~~139~~	5	247
5	Azizbek Shomurodov (UZB)	A	104	107	109	6	131	135	~~139~~	6	244
6	Ion Badanev (MDA)	A	105	~~110~~	~~111~~	9	130	~~135~~	136	4	241
7	Zhora Grigoryan (ARM)	A	105	~~109~~	~~110~~	8	132	~~139~~	~~139~~	7	237
8	Kopkait Sirisuk (THA)	A	100	~~105~~	106	7	123	~~128~~	128	8	234
9	A Tân (VIE)	A	110	~~113~~	~~113~~	4	120	~~126~~	~~126~~	13	230
10	Logan Lockwood (USA)	B	100	103	~~106~~	10	120	126	~~131~~	9	229
11	Claudio Scarantino (ITA)	A	103	~~106~~	~~107~~	11	122	~~128~~	~~128~~	12	225
12	Hong Jun-yan (TPE)	B	95	~~98~~	98	13	115	119	123	10	221
13	Abdel Rahman Hassan (EGY)	B	93	~~97~~	~~97~~	15	114	120	123	11	216
14	Ostap Kovalchuk (UKR)	B	94	97	~~100~~	14	~~113~~	113	118	14	215
15	Mohammed Al-Halyu (KSA)	B	85	~~92~~	92	17	105	110	115	15	207
16	Flavjo Alliaj (ALB)	B	92	~~95~~	~~96~~	16	112	~~118~~	~~118~~	17	204
—	Mumil Al-Qudaihi (KSA)	B	94	97	101	12	~~106~~	~~106~~	~~106~~	—	—
—	Antonino Mullisi (ALB)	B	~~91~~	~~93~~	~~93~~	—	~~110~~	113	~~117~~	16	—

=== 67 kg ===
Rank	Athlete	Group	Snatch (kg)				Clean & Jerk (kg)				Total
Rank	Athlete	Group	1	2	3	Rank	1	2	3	Rank	Total
1st place, gold medalist(s)	Seryozha Barseghyan (ARM)	A	120	125	128	1st place, gold medalist(s)	147	~~150~~	~~150~~	4	275
2nd place, silver medalist(s)	Mohammed Al-Marzouq (KSA)	A	118	~~121~~	121	2nd place, silver medalist(s)	~~143~~	143	149	1st place, gold medalist(s)	270
3rd place, bronze medalist(s)	Bharali Bedabrate (IND)	A	115	~~119~~	119	4	142	146	148	3rd place, bronze medalist(s)	267
4	Nurasyl Arapbay (KAZ)	A	115	~~119~~	120	3rd place, bronze medalist(s)	142	146	~~148~~	5	266
5	Ditto Ika (NRU)	A	100	105	~~110~~	11	140	144	149	2nd place, silver medalist(s)	254
6	Mohammed Al-Zawri (KSA)	A	107	112	~~116~~	6	131	140	~~144~~	6	252
7	Samoel Rrasa (ALB)	A	~~115~~	~~115~~	115	5	~~130~~	~~131~~	133	8	248
8	Ryan McDonald (USA)	A	107	~~111~~	~~111~~	9	128	132	136	7	243
9	Turan Aliyev (AZE)	B	103	107	110	8	125	~~131~~	131	10	241
10	Bohdan Nikitin (UKR)	B	104	108	111	7	122	126	129	12	240
11	Silver Ee (GBR)	B	~~102~~	102	105	10	127	131	~~137~~	9	236
12	Didarbek Jumabaýew (TKM)	B	95	100	104	12	115	120	125	13	229
13	Joshua Strange (AUS)	B	91	95	~~98~~	13	121	126	130	11	225
14	Mariglen Kofsha (ALB)	B	80	~~85~~	~~85~~	14	100	105	~~108~~	14	185

=== 73 kg ===
Rank	Athlete	Group	Snatch (kg)				Clean & Jerk (kg)				Total
Rank	Athlete	Group	1	2	3	Rank	1	2	3	Rank	Total
1st place, gold medalist(s)	Yerasyl Saulebekov (KAZ)	A	130	134	137	1st place, gold medalist(s)	162	168	~~174~~	1st place, gold medalist(s)	305
2nd place, silver medalist(s)	Ravin Almammadov (AZE)	A	127	132	136	2nd place, silver medalist(s)	~~161~~	161	167	2nd place, silver medalist(s)	303
3rd place, bronze medalist(s)	Park Ju-hyeon (KOR)	A	125	~~130~~	131	3rd place, bronze medalist(s)	150	154	158	4	289
4	Goga Jajvani (GEO)	A	125	130	~~132~~	4	148	153	157	5	287
5	Narek Mkrtchyan (ARM)	A	~~123~~	123	~~127~~	5	150	158	~~167~~	3rd place, bronze medalist(s)	281
6	Gabriele La Barbera (ITA)	A	~~113~~	113	~~120~~	6	145	~~153~~	~~157~~	6	258
7	Étienne Jolicoeur (CAN)	A	103	~~107~~	~~107~~	11	133	139	145	7	248
8	Colin Manning (USA)	A	108	~~112~~	~~112~~	7	127	132	~~135~~	8	240
9	Joseph Bravo (CHI)	A	100	105	107	9	125	130	~~135~~	10	237
10	Adrian Krupa (POL)	A	105	~~108~~	108	8	128	~~133~~	~~133~~	11	236
11	Jonas Klinger (AUT)	A	~~104~~	104	~~108~~	10	128	132	~~134~~	9	236
12	Janez Paternoster (SLO)	A	94	98	~~101~~	12	115	~~120~~	~~120~~	12	213

=== 81 kg ===
Rank	Athlete	Group	Snatch (kg)				Clean & Jerk (kg)				Total
Rank	Athlete	Group	1	2	3	Rank	1	2	3	Rank	Total
1st place, gold medalist(s)	Levan Ochigava (GEO)	A	137	~~141~~	143	2nd place, silver medalist(s)	172	176	179	1st place, gold medalist(s)	322
2nd place, silver medalist(s)	Kwon Dae-hee (KOR)	A	135	140	142	3rd place, bronze medalist(s)	174	~~178~~	~~178~~	2nd place, silver medalist(s)	316
3rd place, bronze medalist(s)	Diyorbek Ermatov (UZB)	A	136	141	145	1st place, gold medalist(s)	160	166	169	3rd place, bronze medalist(s)	314
4	Hovhannes Ghahramanyan (ARM)	A	134	140	~~143~~	4	168	~~175~~	~~175~~	4	308
5	Brayan Ibanez (CAN)	A	137	~~142~~	~~144~~	5	161	~~167~~	—	5	298
6	Mohamad Al-Kateb (SYR)	A	~~124~~	124	128	6	151	157	161	6	289
7	Rayen Ghrissa (TUN)	A	117	121	125	7	~~150~~	~~150~~	151	8	276
8	Dawid Lisiak (POL)	A	115	~~120~~	120	8	145	151	~~157~~	7	271
9	Bence Lepkó (HUN)	A	~~110~~	110	~~115~~	10	135	~~140~~	~~140~~	9	245
10	Lachlan Watt (AUS)	A	98	102	~~106~~	11	120	~~124~~	~~124~~	10	222
—	Kale Bunce (USA)	A	110	114	~~118~~	9	~~137~~	~~137~~	~~137~~	—	—

=== 89 kg ===
Rank	Athlete	Group	Snatch (kg)				Clean & Jerk (kg)				Total
Rank	Athlete	Group	1	2	3	Rank	1	2	3	Rank	Total
1st place, gold medalist(s)	Kerem Kurnaz (TUR)	A	138	142	144	2nd place, silver medalist(s)	172	178	183	1st place, gold medalist(s)	327
2nd place, silver medalist(s)	Nurdos Sabyr (KAZ)	A	135	140	145	1st place, gold medalist(s)	165	170	176	2nd place, silver medalist(s)	321
3rd place, bronze medalist(s)	Valerik Movsisyan (ARM)	A	135	140	~~145~~	3rd place, bronze medalist(s)	157	161	166	4	306
4	Ahmad Shammaa (SYR)	A	125	~~129~~	130	6	161	166	171	3rd place, bronze medalist(s)	301
5	Kyle Martin (USA)	B	122	128	132	4	145	152	160	5	292
6	Farukh Shokirzhanov (KGZ)	A	~~125~~	125	131	5	157	~~165~~	~~165~~	7	288
7	Nicu Vîlcu (ROU)	A	123	~~128~~	129	7	150	~~155~~	156	8	285
8	Vladislav Maznik (EST)	A	~~124~~	124	128	8	150	155	~~158~~	10	283
9	Maksym Smyk (UKR)	A	116	119	122	11	147	153	158	6	280
10	Filip Pagáčik (SVK)	B	~~123~~	~~125~~	125	9	143	148	153	11	278
11	Abdullah Al-Ahmad (KSA)	A	118	~~124~~	~~124~~	13	155	~~162~~	~~162~~	9	273
12	Nader Bakr (QAT)	A	~~123~~	123	~~128~~	10	~~148~~	148	~~156~~	12	271
13	Zsolt Nagy (HUN)	B	120	~~125~~	~~125~~	12	145	~~154~~	~~159~~	13	265
14	Lin Yen-chih (TPE)	B	110	~~115~~	115	14	~~144~~	~~144~~	144	14	259
15	Range Robinson (USA)	B	106	110	~~115~~	15	~~143~~	143	~~147~~	15	253
16	Kait Viks (EST)	B	83	87	90	16	103	107	~~110~~	16	197

=== 96 kg ===
Rank	Athlete	Group	Snatch (kg)				Clean & Jerk (kg)				Total
Rank	Athlete	Group	1	2	3	Rank	1	2	3	Rank	Total
1st place, gold medalist(s)	Sami Baki Kıymet (TUR)	A	138	142	145	1st place, gold medalist(s)	171	180	—	1st place, gold medalist(s)	325
2nd place, silver medalist(s)	Simone Abati (ITA)	A	135	140	144	2nd place, silver medalist(s)	165	173	~~182~~	2nd place, silver medalist(s)	317
3rd place, bronze medalist(s)	Ashot Margaryan (ARM)	A	133	137	~~141~~	3rd place, bronze medalist(s)	163	~~168~~	~~170~~	3rd place, bronze medalist(s)	300
4	Yanush Margulis (ISR)	A	~~133~~	135	~~141~~	4	~~160~~	160	~~166~~	5	295
5	Tanislav Angelov (BUL)	A	~~130~~	130	~~135~~	5	150	160	~~166~~	4	290
6	Szabolcs Zsédely (HUN)	A	110	115	118	6	145	150	~~156~~	6	268

=== 102 kg ===
Rank	Athlete	Group	Snatch (kg)				Clean & Jerk (kg)				Total
Rank	Athlete	Group	1	2	3	Rank	1	2	3	Rank	Total
1st place, gold medalist(s)	Nikita Abdrakhmanov (KAZ)	A	150	158	164	1st place, gold medalist(s)	185	195	205	1st place, gold medalist(s)	369
2nd place, silver medalist(s)	Saba Adamia (GEO)	A	128	132	137	2nd place, silver medalist(s)	165	168	~~174~~	2nd place, silver medalist(s)	305
3rd place, bronze medalist(s)	Marcin Ziółkowski (POL)	A	~~130~~	~~135~~	136	4	156	162	166	4	302
4	Cristian Grijalva (MEX)	A	130	~~135~~	137	3rd place, bronze medalist(s)	155	160	~~165~~	6	297
5	So I-jun (KOR)	A	~~122~~	122	128	8	160	~~164~~	167	3rd place, bronze medalist(s)	295
6	Rustam Sahradyan (ARM)	A	125	130	133	6	155	160	~~166~~	5	293
7	Andrii Shpychka (UKR)	A	127	131	135	5	155	~~160~~	~~163~~	8	290
8	Süleýman Jafarow (TKM)	B	126	130	~~134~~	7	145	150	153	12	283
9	Karol Zamośny (POL)	B	120	125	127	9	145	149	154	9	281
10	Givi Darsavelidze (GEO)	B	124	~~128~~	~~128~~	11	145	150	155	7	279
11	José García (ESP)	B	122	~~126~~	126	10	148	151	~~156~~	13	277
12	Corey Robinson (USA)	B	120	~~125~~	~~126~~	13	148	153	~~156~~	10	273
13	Lawrence Hooper (USA)	B	~~120~~	~~120~~	120	14	148	153	~~156~~	11	273
14	András Tyukodi (HUN)	B	115	120	123	12	~~140~~	140	~~146~~	14	263

=== +102 kg ===
Rank	Athlete	Group	Snatch (kg)				Clean & Jerk (kg)				Total
Rank	Athlete	Group	1	2	3	Rank	1	2	3	Rank	Total
1st place, gold medalist(s)	Irakli Vekua (GEO)	A	135	139	141	2nd place, silver medalist(s)	171	175	179	1st place, gold medalist(s)	320
2nd place, silver medalist(s)	Gagik Mkrtchyan (ARM)	A	130	135	139	3rd place, bronze medalist(s)	171	174	~~178~~	2nd place, silver medalist(s)	313
3rd place, bronze medalist(s)	Wang Yu-cheng (TPE)	A	130	135	138	4	165	172	~~176~~	3rd place, bronze medalist(s)	310
4	Ali Mohammad (SYR)	A	137	142	147	1st place, gold medalist(s)	~~161~~	~~161~~	162	6	309
5	Angel Georgiev (BUL)	A	130	134	137	5	165	172	~~174~~	4	309
6	Ke Guan-ting (TPE)	A	120	125	130	7	160	170	~~175~~	5	300
7	Vladyslav Holovanov (UKR)	A	118	122	~~126~~	8	153	160	~~166~~	7	282
8	Wojciech Piotrowski (POL)	A	125	~~131~~	131	6	145	~~150~~	150	9	281
9	Vladyslav Diudia (UKR)	A	112	117	120	9	136	145	~~150~~	10	265
10	Grzegorz Otok (POL)	A	105	110	~~115~~	11	145	~~150~~	150	8	260
11	Muntathir Al-Mohsin (KSA)	A	100	111	~~118~~	10	135	~~146~~	~~146~~	11	246

== Women's results ==
=== 40 kg ===
Rank	Athlete	Group	Snatch (kg)				Clean & Jerk (kg)				Total
Rank	Athlete	Group	1	2	3	Rank	1	2	3	Rank	Total
1st place, gold medalist(s)	Ivy Buzinhani (CAN)	A	51	53	~~54~~	1st place, gold medalist(s)	63	65	67	1st place, gold medalist(s)	120
2nd place, silver medalist(s)	Melek Yağmur Şahin (TUR)	A	~~53~~	~~53~~	53	3rd place, bronze medalist(s)	63	66	~~68~~	2nd place, silver medalist(s)	119
3rd place, bronze medalist(s)	Jyoshna Sabar (IND)	A	50	~~53~~	53	2nd place, silver medalist(s)	~~62~~	62	~~66~~	6	115
4	Roimary Brito (VEN)	A	52	~~54~~	~~54~~	4	63	~~66~~	~~67~~	5	115
5	Maysa Khadraoui (TUN)	A	~~45~~	45	~~48~~	6	65	~~67~~	~~67~~	4	110
6	Şabnam Kerimbaýewa (TKM)	A	47	49	~~53~~	5	55	58	~~61~~	7	107
—	Basma Gunaidy (EGY)	A	~~47~~	~~47~~	~~47~~	—	60	64	66	3rd place, bronze medalist(s)	—

=== 45 kg ===
Rank	Athlete	Group	Snatch (kg)				Clean & Jerk (kg)				Total
Rank	Athlete	Group	1	2	3	Rank	1	2	3	Rank	Total
1st place, gold medalist(s)	Ogulşat Amanowa (TKM)	A	66	69	71	2nd place, silver medalist(s)	80	83	85	1st place, gold medalist(s)	156
2nd place, silver medalist(s)	Angeline Colonia (PHI)	A	~~70~~	70	72	1st place, gold medalist(s)	81	83	~~84~~	4	155
3rd place, bronze medalist(s)	Akanksha Vyavahare (IND)	A	63	66	68	3rd place, bronze medalist(s)	76	79	82	5	150
4	Ezgi Kılıç (TUR)	A	64	67	~~69~~	4	78	81	~~84~~	6	148
5	Lawren Estrada (COL)	A	58	62	~~64~~	8	78	81	84	2nd place, silver medalist(s)	146
6	Asmita Dhone (IND)	A	62	~~65~~	~~65~~	7	80	83	~~85~~	3rd place, bronze medalist(s)	145
7	Nguyễn Thị Hoài (VIE)	A	~~66~~	~~67~~	67	5	77	~~81~~	~~81~~	7	144
8	Kateryna Malashchuk (UKR)	A	59	61	63	6	69	72	74	9	137
9	Delany Lara (ECU)	A	58	~~61~~	61	10	~~75~~	~~75~~	75	8	136
10	Evelyn Gómez (ESP)	A	60	62	~~64~~	9	69	71	~~73~~	11	133
11	Akane Saito (JPN)	A	56	59	~~63~~	11	70	~~73~~	~~73~~	12	129
12	Kim Camilleri (MLT)	A	55	~~57~~	~~58~~	12	71	~~74~~	~~74~~	10	126

=== 49 kg ===
Rank	Athlete	Group	Snatch (kg)				Clean & Jerk (kg)				Total
Rank	Athlete	Group	1	2	3	Rank	1	2	3	Rank	Total
1st place, gold medalist(s)	Pan Hsing-chen (TPE)	A	70	72	73	1st place, gold medalist(s)	85	88	90	1st place, gold medalist(s)	163
2nd place, silver medalist(s)	Habiba Abdel Fattah (EGY)	A	66	~~69~~	69	2nd place, silver medalist(s)	75	81	83	6	152
3rd place, bronze medalist(s)	Maria Stratoudaki (GRE)	A	63	66	~~68~~	5	82	~~86~~	86	2nd place, silver medalist(s)	152
4	Nicoleta Cojocaru (MDA)	A	63	66	68	3rd place, bronze medalist(s)	80	83	~~85~~	4	151
5	Alexia Şipoş (ROU)	A	64	~~67~~	67	4	78	81	84	3rd place, bronze medalist(s)	151
6	Jade Morales (USA)	A	65	~~68~~	~~69~~	8	~~83~~	83	~~85~~	5	148
7	Marena Morales (USA)	A	62	~~65~~	65	9	~~81~~	~~82~~	82	7	147
8	Naudisbel Rodríguez (VEN)	A	~~66~~	66	~~69~~	6	77	80	~~84~~	9	146
9	Bar Koyel (IND)	A	61	64	~~67~~	10	80	~~83~~	~~83~~	8	144
10	Andżelika Młynarczyk (POL)	A	60	63	~~65~~	11	74	77	~~82~~	11	140
11	Asees Dhanda (GBR)	A	61	~~64~~	~~64~~	12	75	~~78~~	78	10	139
12	Margot Kochetova (FRA)	A	61	64	66	7	70	~~74~~	~~75~~	12	136
13	Tahaisha Grundler (NRU)	B	45	47	50	13	57	61	65	13	115
14	Anna Almyroudi (GRE)	B	41	44	48	14	51	55	~~60~~	14	103

=== 55 kg ===
Rank	Athlete	Group	Snatch (kg)				Clean & Jerk (kg)				Total
Rank	Athlete	Group	1	2	3	Rank	1	2	3	Rank	Total
1st place, gold medalist(s)	Gelen Torres (COL)	A	78	80	82	1st place, gold medalist(s)	95	98	100	2nd place, silver medalist(s)	182
2nd place, silver medalist(s)	Rosalinda Faustino (PHI)	A	75	~~78~~	78	4	96	100	~~105~~	1st place, gold medalist(s)	178
3rd place, bronze medalist(s)	Emily Ibanez (CAN)	A	73	77	79	2nd place, silver medalist(s)	95	98	~~101~~	3rd place, bronze medalist(s)	177
4	Darya Balabayuk (KAZ)	A	73	76	78	3rd place, bronze medalist(s)	93	~~97~~	97	6	175
5	Brithany Moncayo (ECU)	A	73	~~77~~	77	5	~~92~~	92	96	8	173
6	Yilihannys Jiménez (VEN)	A	72	74	~~77~~	6	94	~~97~~	98	4	172
7	Aya Motawea (EGY)	A	67	70	~~73~~	12	88	~~96~~	97	5	167
8	Maria Ghihanis (ROU)	A	66	70	72	7	85	90	~~93~~	10	162
9	Lucía González (ESP)	A	68	71	~~73~~	9	88	90	~~93~~	11	161
10	Kim Ye-been (KOR)	A	65	~~69~~	~~69~~	18	92	96	~~99~~	7	161
11	Beatriz de Lima (BRA)	A	70	~~73~~	~~73~~	11	90	~~93~~	~~93~~	9	160
12	Julia Szczepaniak (POL)	A	69	~~72~~	~~72~~	13	82	85	~~89~~	14	154
13	Mina Santa (IND)	B	63	67	70	10	83	~~87~~	~~87~~	16	153
14	My-Only Stephen (NRU)	B	~~67~~	67	~~70~~	14	83	~~86~~	86	12	153
15	Maria Andras (CAN)	B	68	71	~~73~~	8	~~81~~	81	~~84~~	18	152
16	Chloe Perkins (AUS)	B	62	~~66~~	66	16	80	~~83~~	84	15	150
17	Hoàng Thị Kim Oanh (VIE)	B	65	~~68~~	~~69~~	17	85	~~87~~	—	13	150
18	Jordan Nantz (USA)	B	63	66	~~68~~	15	79	82	~~84~~	17	148
19	Julie De Wispelaere (BEL)	B	64	~~67~~	~~67~~	19	77	~~79~~	80	19	144
20	Gracie Rice (USA)	B	61	~~63~~	63	20	~~79~~	79	~~83~~	20	142
21	Sachini Rajapaksha (SRI)	B	57	60	62	21	75	~~78~~	~~78~~	21	137
22	Dihini Withana (SRI)	B	36	~~40~~	40	22	43	46	49	22	89

=== 59 kg ===
Rank	Athlete	Group	Snatch (kg)				Clean & Jerk (kg)				Total
Rank	Athlete	Group	1	2	3	Rank	1	2	3	Rank	Total
1st place, gold medalist(s)	Medine Amanowa (TKM)	A	85	~~89~~	90	1st place, gold medalist(s)	105	109	~~115~~	1st place, gold medalist(s)	199
2nd place, silver medalist(s)	Jessica Palacios (ECU)	A	84	88	~~90~~	2nd place, silver medalist(s)	103	~~107~~	107	2nd place, silver medalist(s)	195
3rd place, bronze medalist(s)	Enkileda Carja (ALB)	B	85	~~87~~	87	3rd place, bronze medalist(s)	100	~~105~~	~~105~~	5	187
4	Hanin El-Sayed (EGY)	A	78	82	~~86~~	4	100	~~106~~	~~106~~	6	182
5	Greta De Riso (ITA)	A	80	~~83~~	~~84~~	6	101	~~105~~	~~108~~	3rd place, bronze medalist(s)	181
6	Altynay Tanibergenova (KAZ)	A	74	77	~~80~~	9	97	101	~~107~~	4	178
7	Estefania Dobre (ROU)	A	73	76	79	8	93	96	~~98~~	7	175
8	Lili Deroulede (FRA)	A	75	78	80	7	90	~~93~~	93	10	173
9	Emma Heck (USA)	A	70	74	77	10	93	~~97~~	~~97~~	8	170
10	Ava Giorgi (USA)	A	71	74	77	11	89	92	~~95~~	11	169
11	Alina Daderko (UKR)	A	72	74	~~76~~	12	88	91	93	9	167
12	Huang Hsing-yu (TPE)	B	65	68	~~70~~	14	85	88	90	12	158
13	Bianca Arias (CHI)	B	65	68	71	13	75	~~80~~	80	16	151
14	Chiara Reljac (CRO)	B	66	~~70~~	~~70~~	15	85	~~88~~	~~90~~	14	151
15	Chloe Saliba (AUS)	B	~~63~~	~~63~~	63	18	80	84	87	13	150
16	Ráchel Závacká (SVK)	B	62	65	~~68~~	16	74	78	81	15	146
17	Jo Deireragea (NRU)	B	60	63	65	17	70	75	~~80~~	17	140
—	Claudia Rengifo (VEN)	A	78	~~81~~	81	5	~~97~~	~~97~~	~~97~~	—	—

=== 64 kg ===
Rank	Athlete	Group	Snatch (kg)				Clean & Jerk (kg)				Total
Rank	Athlete	Group	1	2	3	Rank	1	2	3	Rank	Total
1st place, gold medalist(s)	Thanaporn Saetia (THA)	A	88	90	93	1st place, gold medalist(s)	109	113	~~116~~	1st place, gold medalist(s)	206
2nd place, silver medalist(s)	Taissiya Alexeyeva (KAZ)	A	84	87	89	2nd place, silver medalist(s)	105	109	112	2nd place, silver medalist(s)	201
3rd place, bronze medalist(s)	Ingrid Segura (COL)	A	82	86	~~89~~	4	~~108~~	108	—	3rd place, bronze medalist(s)	194
4	Olivia Selemaia (NZL)	A	81	84	~~87~~	5	103	107	~~109~~	4	191
5	Gülälek Kakamyradowa (TKM)	A	80	85	88	3rd place, bronze medalist(s)	~~101~~	101	~~106~~	5	189
6	Femily-Crystie Notte (NRU)	A	77	83	~~86~~	6	95	100	~~105~~	8	183
7	Loujain Amara (TUN)	A	75	~~78~~	78	8	100	~~106~~	~~106~~	7	178
8	Sara Iafrate (FRA)	A	74	~~78~~	~~78~~	10	95	99	101	6	175
9	Menna El-Feky (EGY)	A	72	76	80	7	90	~~96~~	~~96~~	11	170
10	Zeng Jing-chun (TPE)	B	75	~~78~~	~~78~~	9	~~90~~	~~90~~	90	10	165
11	Andrada Galvao (BEL)	B	69	72	~~74~~	12	~~90~~	~~90~~	91	9	163
12	Oleksandra Chmukh (UKR)	B	71	73	~~75~~	11	85	89	~~93~~	12	162
13	Lillian Spry (USA)	B	~~66~~	66	70	13	82	~~86~~	89	13	159
14	Tiana Ahumada (CHI)	B	65	69	~~72~~	14	~~80~~	~~80~~	80	14	149

=== 71 kg ===
Rank	Athlete	Group	Snatch (kg)				Clean & Jerk (kg)				Total
Rank	Athlete	Group	1	2	3	Rank	1	2	3	Rank	Total
1st place, gold medalist(s)	Phattharathida Wongsing (THA)	A	90	~~92~~	92	1st place, gold medalist(s)	114	117	120	1st place, gold medalist(s)	212
2nd place, silver medalist(s)	Burcu Gerçekden (TUR)	A	85	88	~~91~~	3rd place, bronze medalist(s)	111	~~113~~	113	2nd place, silver medalist(s)	201
3rd place, bronze medalist(s)	Keily Silva (VEN)	A	87	~~90~~	~~90~~	5	105	108	112	3rd place, bronze medalist(s)	199
4	Anna Ylisoini (FIN)	A	87	89	91	2nd place, silver medalist(s)	104	107	~~110~~	5	198
5	Chiang Sin-yueh (TPE)	A	~~88~~	~~88~~	88	4	100	105	~~108~~	7	193
6	Ayanat Zhumagali (KAZ)	A	82	85	~~88~~	6	105	~~109~~	~~112~~	6	190
7	Ivanna Cerquera (COL)	A	~~78~~	78	~~81~~	9	107	~~111~~	~~111~~	4	185
8	Alina Sukiasyan (ARM)	A	82	~~87~~	~~88~~	7	100	~~105~~	~~105~~	8	182
9	Janna Hassanein (EGY)	A	~~78~~	78	~~82~~	8	95	~~103~~	~~103~~	11	173
10	Taiamoni Pakoti (AUS)	B	70	72	~~75~~	13	91	94	99	10	171
11	Anna Korol (UKR)	A	73	76	~~79~~	10	92	~~96~~	~~96~~	13	168
12	Laura Cruickshank (AUS)	B	72	~~75~~	75	11	91	~~94~~	~~94~~	14	166
13	Kimberly Wiese (USA)	B	71	74	~~77~~	12	92	~~96~~	~~99~~	12	166
—	Minni Hormavirta (FIN)	A	~~80~~	~~80~~	~~80~~	—	100	~~105~~	~~105~~	9	—
—	Mia Quiñones (PUR)	B	~~70~~	~~70~~	~~70~~	—	85	88	~~91~~	15	—

=== 76 kg ===
Rank	Athlete	Group	Snatch (kg)				Clean & Jerk (kg)				Total
Rank	Athlete	Group	1	2	3	Rank	1	2	3	Rank	Total
1st place, gold medalist(s)	Ella Nicholson (USA)	A	95	98	101	1st place, gold medalist(s)	114	117	121	2nd place, silver medalist(s)	222
2nd place, silver medalist(s)	Rahma El-Sayed (EGY)	A	95	99	~~102~~	2nd place, silver medalist(s)	~~117~~	117	122	1st place, gold medalist(s)	221
3rd place, bronze medalist(s)	Anna Amroyan (ARM)	A	85	88	~~91~~	5	111	114	116	4	204
4	Chun Yoo-been (KOR)	A	84	~~87~~	87	7	~~113~~	113	116	3rd place, bronze medalist(s)	203
5	Sanjana (IND)	A	83	86	88	6	107	~~112~~	112	5	200
6	Madina Fayzullaeva (UZB)	A	86	~~90~~	90	4	108	~~111~~	~~112~~	6	198
7	Aruzhan Dauletova (KAZ)	A	82	~~86~~	86	8	102	106	~~110~~	7	192
8	Rinad Hassan (EGY)	A	85	89	91	3rd place, bronze medalist(s)	100	~~109~~	~~109~~	8	191
9	Natálie Vybíralová (CZE)	A	~~70~~	72	75	9	89	93	~~95~~	10	168
10	Issys Tobia-Pita (NZL)	A	~~70~~	70	~~75~~	10	90	95	~~99~~	9	165

=== 81 kg ===
Rank	Athlete	Group	Snatch (kg)				Clean & Jerk (kg)				Total
Rank	Athlete	Group	1	2	3	Rank	1	2	3	Rank	Total
1st place, gold medalist(s)	Shams Abdel Azim (EGY)	A	96	100	103	1st place, gold medalist(s)	120	125	129	1st place, gold medalist(s)	232
2nd place, silver medalist(s)	Mariam Murgvliani (GEO)	A	95	99	102	2nd place, silver medalist(s)	116	121	127	2nd place, silver medalist(s)	229
3rd place, bronze medalist(s)	Emma Poghosyan (ARM)	A	90	95	98	3rd place, bronze medalist(s)	117	123	~~128~~	3rd place, bronze medalist(s)	221
4	Chen Ko-ko (TPE)	A	80	84	87	6	105	108	~~111~~	6	195
5	Saniya Ormanbayeva (KAZ)	A	77	81	83	7	105	~~110~~	110	5	193
6	Basmala Ragab (EGY)	A	77	81	~~85~~	10	98	106	110	4	191
7	Sofiia Kozak (UKR)	A	79	~~82~~	82	9	97	101	104	7	186
8	Sara Dal Bò (ITA)	A	75	~~80~~	82	8	95	100	~~107~~	9	182
9	Natalie Cerna (CAN)	A	74	78	~~82~~	11	95	99	103	8	181
—	Anamjan Rustamowa (TKM)	A	97	~~101~~	~~102~~	4	~~120~~	~~120~~	~~125~~	—	—
—	Büşra Çan (TUR)	A	94	97	~~100~~	5	—	—	—	—	—

=== +81 kg ===
Rank	Athlete	Group	Snatch (kg)				Clean & Jerk (kg)				Total
Rank	Athlete	Group	1	2	3	Rank	1	2	3	Rank	Total
1st place, gold medalist(s)	Tuana Süren (TUR)	A	98	101	104	1st place, gold medalist(s)	122	126	~~131~~	2nd place, silver medalist(s)	230
2nd place, silver medalist(s)	Etta Love (CAN)	A	92	~~95~~	95	3rd place, bronze medalist(s)	120	126	130	1st place, gold medalist(s)	225
3rd place, bronze medalist(s)	Trần Thị Hiền (VIE)	A	91	94	96	2nd place, silver medalist(s)	121	124	~~127~~	3rd place, bronze medalist(s)	220
4	Angel Billen (CAN)	A	90	~~93~~	~~94~~	5	115	119	~~124~~	4	209
5	Martina Maibam (IND)	A	85	90	93	4	108	~~113~~	115	5	208
6	Hanna Kalashnyk (UKR)	A	79	~~84~~	84	7	106	109	~~115~~	6	193
7	Katarzyna Kozera (POL)	A	79	83	86	6	98	103	106	7	192
8	Pan Hsiang-yun (TPE)	A	75	79	81	8	93	100	105	8	186
