= List of Asian junior records in Olympic weightlifting =

This is the list of Asian junior records in Olympic weightlifting. Records are maintained in each weight class for the snatch lift, clean and jerk lift, and the total for both lifts by the Asian Weightlifting Federation (AWF).

== Current records ==
=== Men ===
Event	Record	Athlete	Nation	Date	Meet	Place	Age	Ref
60 kg
Snatch	132 kg	Yuan Hao	China	3 October 2025	World Championships	Førde, Norway	19 years, 104 days	
Clean & Jerk	164 kg	K'Duong	Vietnam	13 December 2025	SEA Games	Chonburi, Thailand	18 years, 163 days	
Total	290 kg	Asian Standard						
65 kg
Snatch	138 kg	Wang Liqian	China	3 May 2026	World Junior Championships	Ismailia, Egypt	19 years, 283 days	
Clean & Jerk	173 kg	Patsaphong Thongsuk	Thailand	14 December 2025	SEA Games	Chonburi, Thailand	20 years, 231 days	
Total	307 kg	Patsaphong Thongsuk	Thailand	14 December 2025	SEA Games	Chonburi, Thailand	20 years, 231 days	
70 kg
Snatch	144 kg	Albert Delos Santos	Philippines	30 October 2026	World Championships	Ningbo, China	20 years, 79 days	
Clean & Jerk	187 kg	Albert Delos Santos	Philippines	30 October 2026	World Championships	Ningbo, China	20 years, 79 days	
Total	331 kg	Albert Delos Santos	Philippines	30 October 2026	World Championships	Ningbo, China	20 years, 79 days	
75 kg
Snatch	152 kg	Didarbek Jumabaýew	Turkmenistan	31 October 2026	World Championships	Ningbo, China	18 years, 158 days	
Clean & Jerk	188 kg	Didarbek Jumabaýew	Turkmenistan	31 October 2026	World Championships	Ningbo, China	18 years, 158 days	
Total	340 kg	Didarbek Jumabaýew	Turkmenistan	31 October 2026	World Championships	Ningbo, China	18 years, 158 days	
85 kg
Snatch	161 kg	Khikmatillo Khaydarov	Uzbekistan	12 August 2026	Asian Junior Championships	Tashkent, Uzbekistan	20 years, 125 days	
Clean & Jerk	200 kg	Asian Standard						
Total	358 kg	Akzhol Kurmanbek	Kazakhstan	12 August 2026	Asian Junior Championships	Tashkent, Uzbekistan	18 years, 248 days	
95 kg
Snatch	168 kg	Asian Standard						
Clean & Jerk	214 kg	Hamidreza Zarei	Iran	13 August 2026	Asian Junior Championships	Tashkent, Uzbekistan	19 years, 25 days	
Total	378 kg	Asian Standard						
110 kg
Snatch	184 kg	Alireza Nassiri	Iran	10 October 2025	World Championships	Førde, Norway	19 years, 300 days	
Clean & Jerk	231 kg	Alireza Nassiri	Iran	10 October 2025	World Championships	Førde, Norway	19 years, 300 days	
Total	415 kg	Alireza Nassiri	Iran	10 October 2025	World Championships	Førde, Norway	19 years, 300 days	
+110 kg
Snatch	196 kg	Asian Standard						
Clean & Jerk	235 kg	Asian Standard						
Total	431 kg	Asian Standard						

=== Women ===
Event	Record	Athlete	Nation	Date	Meet	Place	Age	Ref
49 kg
Snatch	88 kg	Asian Standard						
Clean & Jerk	114 kg	Asian Standard						
Total	202 kg	Asian Standard						
53 kg
Snatch	92 kg	Asian Standard						
Clean & Jerk	119 kg	Asian Standard						
Total	211 kg	Asian Standard						
57 kg
Snatch	96 kg	Asian Standard						
Clean & Jerk	122 kg	Asian Standard						
Total	218 kg	Asian Standard						
61 kg
Snatch	112 kg	Yang Liuyue	China	25 September 2026	Asian Games	Nagoya, Japan	19 years, 289 days	
Clean & Jerk	139 kg	Yang Liuyue	China	25 September 2026	Asian Games	Nagoya, Japan	19 years, 289 days	
Total	251 kg	Yang Liuyue	China	25 September 2026	Asian Games	Nagoya, Japan	19 years, 289 days	
69 kg
Snatch	107 kg	Ingrid Segura	Bahrain	7 October 2025	World Championships	Førde, Norway	19 years, 100 days	
Clean & Jerk	138 kg	Lin Jingwei	China	5 May 2026	World Junior Championships	Ismailia, Egypt	18 years, 100 days	
Total	245 kg	Lin Jingwei	China	5 May 2026	World Junior Championships	Ismailia, Egypt	18 years, 100 days	
77 kg
Snatch	111 kg	Asian Standard						
Clean & Jerk	139 kg	Asian Standard						
Total	248 kg	Asian Standard						
86 kg
Snatch	118 kg	Anamjan Rustamowa	Turkmenistan	7 November 2026	World Championships	Ningbo, China	20 years, 183 days	
Clean & Jerk	147 kg	Anamjan Rustamowa	Turkmenistan	7 May 2026	World Junior Championships	Ismailia, Egypt	19 years, 364 days	
Total	264 kg	Anamjan Rustamowa	Turkmenistan	7 November 2026	World Championships	Ningbo, China	20 years, 183 days	
+86 kg
Snatch	143 kg	Asian Standard						
Clean & Jerk	179 kg	Asian Standard						
Total	319 kg	Asian Standard						

== Historical records ==
=== Men (2025–2026) ===
Event	Record	Athlete	Nation	Date	Meet	Place	Age	Ref
71 kg
Snatch	145 kg	Asian Standard						
Clean & Jerk	187 kg	Albert Delos Santos	Philippines	4 May 2026	World Junior Championships	Ismailia, Egypt	19 years, 265 days	
Total	326 kg	Albert Delos Santos	Philippines	4 May 2026	World Junior Championships	Ismailia, Egypt	19 years, 265 days	
79 kg
Snatch	157 kg	Ning Gan	China	6 October 2025	World Championships	Førde, Norway	19 years, 31 days	
Clean & Jerk	196 kg	Yedige Yemberdi	Kazakhstan	6 October 2025	World Championships	Førde, Norway	20 years, 153 days	
Total	351 kg	Yedige Yemberdi	Kazakhstan	6 October 2025	World Championships	Førde, Norway	20 years, 153 days	
88 kg
Snatch	163 kg	Asian Standard						
Clean & Jerk	205 kg	Asian Standard						
Total	367 kg	Asian Standard						
94 kg
Snatch	169 kg	Asian Standard						
Clean & Jerk	213 kg	Denis Poluboyarinov	Kazakhstan	8 July 2025	Asian Junior Championships	Astana, Kazakhstan	19 years, 280 days	
Total	380 kg	Asian Standard						

=== Men (2018–2025) ===
Event	Record	Athlete	Nation	Date	Meet	Place	Age	Ref
55 kg
Snatch	123 kg	Kotaro Tomari	Japan	30 April 2025	World Junior Championships	Lima, Peru	19 years, 303 days	
Clean & Jerk	148 kg	Theerapong Silachai	Thailand	6 December 2022	World Championships	Bogotá, Colombia	19 years, 17 days	
Total	266 kg	Kotaro Tomari	Japan	30 April 2025	World Junior Championships	Lima, Peru	19 years, 303 days	
61 kg
Snatch	136 kg	Adkhamjon Ergashev	Uzbekistan	3 November 2018	World Championships	Ashgabat, Turkmenistan	19 years, 236 days	
Clean & Jerk	171 kg	Pak Myong-jin	North Korea	1 October 2023	Asian Games	Hangzhou, China	20 years, 182 days	
Total	307 kg	Pak Myong-jin	North Korea	1 October 2023	Asian Games	Hangzhou, China	20 years, 182 days	
67 kg
Snatch	146 kg	Adkhamjon Ergashev	Uzbekistan	20 September 2019	World Championships	Pattaya, Thailand	20 years, 192 days	
Clean & Jerk	182 kg	Adkhamjon Ergashev	Uzbekistan	20 September 2019	World Championships	Pattaya, Thailand	20 years, 192 days	
Total	328 kg	Adkhamjon Ergashev	Uzbekistan	20 September 2019	World Championships	Pattaya, Thailand	20 years, 192 days	
73 kg
Snatch	157 kg	Rizki Juniansyah	Indonesia	21 July 2022	Asian Youth & Junior Championships	Tashkent, Uzbekistan	19 years, 34 days	
Clean & Jerk	198 kg	Weeraphon Wichuma	Thailand	8 August 2024	Olympic Games	Paris, France	20 years, 56 days	
Total	351 kg	Weeraphon Wichuma	Thailand	3 October 2023	Asian Games	Hangzhou, China	19 years, 54 days	
81 kg
Snatch	168 kg	Li Dayin	China	5 November 2018	World Championships	Ashgabat, Turkmenistan	20 years, 266 days	
Clean & Jerk	204 kg	Li Dayin	China	5 November 2018	World Championships	Ashgabat, Turkmenistan	20 years, 266 days	
Total	372 kg	Li Dayin	China	5 November 2018	World Championships	Ashgabat, Turkmenistan	20 years, 266 days	
89 kg
Snatch	166 kg	Alireza Moeini	Iran	23 July 2022	Asian Youth & Junior Championships	Tashkent, Uzbekistan	20 years, 145 days	
Clean & Jerk	209 kg	Pan Yunhua	China	12 May 2025	Asian Championships	Jiangshan, China	19 years, 170 days	
Total	372 kg	Pan Yunhua	China	12 May 2025	Asian Championships	Jiangshan, China	19 years, 170 days	
96 kg
Snatch	172 kg	Faris Ibrahim	Qatar	21 December 2018	Qatar Cup	Doha, Qatar	20 years, 200 days	
Clean & Jerk	225 kg	Faris Ibrahim	Qatar	21 December 2018	Qatar Cup	Doha, Qatar	20 years, 200 days	
Total	397 kg	Faris Ibrahim	Qatar	21 December 2018	Qatar Cup	Doha, Qatar	20 years, 200 days	
102 kg
Snatch	180 kg	Akbar Djuraev	Uzbekistan	8 November 2018	World Championships	Ashgabat, Turkmenistan	19 years, 31 days	
Clean & Jerk	219 kg	Şahzadbek Matýakubow	Turkmenistan	24 December 2024	Asian Junior Championships	Doha, Qatar	20 years, 298 days	
Total	396 kg	Şahzadbek Matýakubow	Turkmenistan	24 December 2024	Asian Junior Championships	Doha, Qatar	20 years, 298 days	
109 kg
Snatch	188 kg	Akbar Djuraev	Uzbekistan	26 September 2019	World Championships	Pattaya, Thailand	19 years, 353 days	
Clean & Jerk	229 kg	Akbar Djuraev	Uzbekistan	26 September 2019	World Championships	Pattaya, Thailand	19 years, 353 days	
Total	417 kg	Akbar Djuraev	Uzbekistan	26 September 2019	World Championships	Pattaya, Thailand	19 years, 353 days	
+109 kg
Snatch	204 kg	Ali Rubaiawi	Iraq	15 December 2024	World Championships	Manama, Bahrain	20 years, 135 days	
Clean & Jerk	247 kg	Ali Rubaiawi	Iraq	15 December 2024	World Championships	Manama, Bahrain	20 years, 135 days	
Total	451 kg	Ali Rubaiawi	Iraq	15 December 2024	World Championships	Manama, Bahrain	20 years, 135 days	

=== Men (1998–2018) ===
Event	Record	Athlete	Nation	Date	Meet	Place	Age	Ref
56 kg
Snatch	135 kg	Thạch Kim Tuấn	Vietnam	8 November 2014	World Championships	Almaty, Kazakhstan	20 years, 248 days	JWR
Clean & Jerk	165 kg	Wu Wenxiong	China	20 May 2001	East Asian Games	Osaka, Japan	20 years, 98 days	JWR
Total	296 kg	Thạch Kim Tuấn	Vietnam	8 November 2014	World Championships	Almaty, Kazakhstan	20 years, 248 days	JWR
62 kg
Snatch	152 kg	Shi Zhiyong	China	3 May 2000	Asian Championships	Osaka, Japan	20 years, 83 days	JWR
Clean & Jerk	177 kg	Yang Fan	China	22 April 2007	Asian Championships	Tai'an, China	19 years, 188 days	JWR
Total	322 kg	Shi Zhiyong	China	3 May 2000	Asian Championships	Osaka, Japan	20 years, 83 days	JWR
69 kg
Snatch	156 kg	Yao Yuewei	China	23 November 2005	Asian Championships	Dubai, United Arab Emirates	20 years, 245 days	
Clean & Jerk	190 kg	Liao Hui	China	28 November 2007	World Cup	Apia, Samoa	20 years, 54 days	JWR
Total	342 kg	Wu Chao	China	10 May 2012	World Junior Championships	Guatemala City, Guatemala	20 years, 112 days	
77 kg
Snatch	165 kg	Guo Zhimin	China	5 May 2013		Lima, Peru	19 years, 337 days	
Clean & Jerk	203 kg	Elkhan Aligulizada	Azerbaijan	23 November 2015	World Championships	Houston, United States	20 years, 292 days	JWR
Total	357 kg	Elkhan Aligulizada	Azerbaijan	23 November 2015	World Championships	Houston, United States	20 years, 292 days	
85 kg
Snatch	180 kg	Vladimir Sedov	Kazakhstan	15 August 2008	Olympic Games	Beijing, China	20 years, 166 days	
Clean & Jerk	218 kg	Tian Tao	China	24 September 2014	Asian Games	Incheon, South Korea	20 years, 169 days	JWR
Total	386 kg	Ilya Ilin	Kazakhstan	14 November 2005	World Championships	Doha, Qatar	17 years, 174 days	JWR
94 kg
Snatch	183 kg	Saeid Mohammadpour	Iran	4 August 2012	Olympic Games	London, United Kingdom	19 years, 154 days	
Clean & Jerk	226 kg	Ilya Ilin	Kazakhstan	5 December 2006	Asian Games	Doha, Qatar	18 years, 195 days	
Total	406 kg	Ilya Ilin	Kazakhstan	17 August 2008	Olympic Games	Beijing, China	20 years, 85 days	
105 kg
Snatch	187 kg	Yang Zhe	China	9 April 2011	Asian Championships	Tongling, China	19 years, 269 days	
Clean & Jerk	217 kg	Yang Zhe	China	19 November 2010	Asian Games	Guangzhou, China	19 years, 128 days	
Total	403 kg	Yang Zhe	China	9 April 2011	Asian Championships	Tongling, China	19 years, 269 days	
+105 kg
Snatch	206 kg	Saeid Alihosseini	Iran	8 December 2008	Asian Junior Championships	Jeonju, South Korea	20 years, 310 days	JWR
Clean & Jerk	245 kg	Saeid Alihosseini	Iran	8 December 2008	Asian Junior Championships	Jeonju, South Korea	20 years, 310 days	JWR
Total	451 kg	Saeid Alihosseini	Iran	8 December 2008	Asian Junior Championships	Jeonju, South Korea	20 years, 310 days	JWR

=== Women (2025–2026) ===
Event	Record	Athlete	Nation	Date	Meet	Place	Age	Ref
48 kg
Snatch	87 kg	Asian Standard						
Clean & Jerk	114 kg	Asian Standard						
Total	201 kg	Asian Standard						
58 kg
Snatch	101 kg	Wei Tingna	China	13 May 2026	Asian Championships	Gandhinagar, India	19 years, 360 days	
Clean & Jerk	124 kg	Asian Standard						
Total	225 kg	Wei Tingna	China	13 May 2026	Asian Championships	Gandhinagar, India	19 years, 360 days	
63 kg
Snatch	112 kg	Yang Liuyue	China	14 May 2026	Asian Championships	Gandhinagar, India	19 years, 155 days	
Clean & Jerk	139 kg	Yang Liuyue	China	14 May 2026	Asian Championships	Gandhinagar, India	19 years, 155 days	
Total	251 kg	Yang Liuyue	China	14 May 2026	Asian Championships	Gandhinagar, India	19 years, 155 days	

=== Women (2018–2025) ===
Event	Record	Athlete	Nation	Date	Meet	Place	Age	Ref
45 kg
Snatch	78 kg	Standard						
Clean & Jerk	104 kg	Ýulduz Jumabaýewa	Turkmenistan	2 November 2018	World Championships	Ashgabat, Turkmenistan	20 years, 194 days	
Total	179 kg	Ýulduz Jumabaýewa	Turkmenistan	2 November 2018	World Championships	Ashgabat, Turkmenistan	20 years, 194 days	
49 kg
Snatch	92 kg	Jiang Huihua	China	3 November 2018	World Championships	Ashgabat, Turkmenistan	20 years, 285 days	
Clean & Jerk	120 kg	Xiang Linxiang	China	7 December 2024	World Championships	Manama, Bahrain	20 years, 268 days	
Total	212 kg	Xiang Linxiang	China	7 December 2024	World Championships	Manama, Bahrain	20 years, 268 days	
55 kg
Snatch	99 kg	Zhang Haiqin	China	10 May 2025	Asian Championships	Jiangshan, China	20 years, 124 days	
Clean & Jerk	126 kg	Zhang Haiqin	China	10 May 2025	Asian Championships	Jiangshan, China	20 years, 124 days	
Total	225 kg	Zhang Haiqin	China	10 May 2025	Asian Championships	Jiangshan, China	20 years, 124 days	
59 kg
Snatch	111 kg	Kim Il-gyong	North Korea	2 October 2023	Asian Games	Hangzhou, China	20 years, 67 days	
Clean & Jerk	136 kg	Kim Il-gyong	North Korea	8 December 2023	IWF Grand Prix	Doha, Qatar	20 years, 134 days	
Total	246 kg	Kim Il-gyong	North Korea	2 October 2023	Asian Games	Hangzhou, China	20 years, 67 days	
64 kg
Snatch	114 kg	Ri Suk	North Korea	9 December 2023	IWF Grand Prix	Doha, Qatar	20 years, 269 days	
Clean & Jerk	146 kg	Ri Suk	North Korea	9 December 2023	IWF Grand Prix	Doha, Qatar	20 years, 269 days	
Total	260 kg	Ri Suk	North Korea	9 December 2023	IWF Grand Prix	Doha, Qatar	20 years, 269 days	
71 kg
Snatch	108 kg	Song Kuk-hyang	North Korea	24 October 2019	Asian Youth & Junior Championships	Pyongyang, North Korea	18 years, 265 days	
Clean & Jerk	141 kg	Vanessa Sarno	Philippines	10 December 2023	IWF Grand Prix	Doha, Qatar	20 years, 73 days	
Total	249 kg	Vanessa Sarno	Philippines	10 December 2023	IWF Grand Prix	Doha, Qatar	20 years, 73 days	
76 kg
Snatch	110 kg	Standard						
Clean & Jerk	138 kg	Standard						
Total	246 kg	Standard						
81 kg
Snatch	113 kg	Standard						
Clean & Jerk	142 kg	Standard						
Total	252 kg	Standard						
87 kg
Snatch	115 kg	Standard						
Clean & Jerk	145 kg	Standard						
Total	258 kg	Standard						
+87 kg
Snatch	149 kg	Li Yan	China	15 December 2024	World Championships	Manama, Bahrain	20 years, 341 days	
Clean & Jerk	186 kg	Li Wenwen	China	27 September 2019	World Championships	Pattaya, Thailand	19 years, 206 days	
Total	332 kg	Li Wenwen	China	27 September 2019	World Championships	Pattaya, Thailand	19 years, 206 days	

=== Women (1998–2018) ===
Event	Record	Athlete	Nation	Date	Meet	Place	Age	Ref
–48 kg
Snatch	95 kg	Wang Mingjuan	China	9 November 2005	World Championships	Doha, Qatar	20 years, 172 days	JWR
Clean & Jerk	118 kg	Wang Mingjuan	China	9 November 2005	World Championships	Doha, Qatar	20 years, 172 days	JWR
Total	213 kg	Wang Mingjuan	China	9 November 2005	World Championships	Doha, Qatar	20 years, 172 days	JWR
–53 kg
Snatch	102 kg	Zhang Wanqiong	China	21 September 2014	Asian Games	Incheon, South Korea	20 years, 243 days	JWR
Clean & Jerk	131 kg	Zulfiya Chinshanlo	Kazakhstan	29 July 2012	Olympic Games	London, United Kingdom	19 years, 4 days	JWR
Total	228 kg	Zhang Wanqiong	China	21 September 2014	Asian Games	Incheon, South Korea	20 years, 243 days	JWR
–58 kg
Snatch	110 kg	Wang Li	China	10 August 2003	Asian Junior Championships	Bali, Indonesia	17 years, 334 days	JWR
Clean & Jerk	139 kg	Gu Wei	China	11 November 2005	World Championships	Doha, Qatar	19 years, 200 days	JWR
Total	244 kg	Deng Wei	China	7 November 2012	University World Championships	Eilat, Israel	19 years, 267 days	JWR
–63 kg
Snatch	113 kg	Ouyang Xiaofang	China	10 August 2003	Asian Junior Championships	Bali, Indonesia	20 years, 127 days	
Clean & Jerk	136 kg	Jo Pok Hyang	North Korea	11 November 2012	Asian Junior Championships	Yangon, Myanmar	19 years, 362 days	JWR
Total	242 kg	Ouyang Xiaofang	China	10 August 2003	Asian Junior Championships	Bali, Indonesia	20 years, 127 days	
–69 kg
Snatch	122 kg	Liu Chunhong	China	19 August 2004	Olympic Games	Athens, Greece	19 years, 203 days	
Clean & Jerk	153 kg	Liu Chunhong	China	19 August 2004	Olympic Games	Athens, Greece	19 years, 203 days	
Total	275 kg	Liu Chunhong	China	19 August 2004	Olympic Games	Athens, Greece	19 years, 203 days	JWR
–75 kg
Snatch	126 kg	Liu Chunhong	China	13 November 2005	World Championships	Doha, Qatar	20 years, 288 days	
Clean & Jerk	159 kg	Liu Chunhong	China	13 November 2005	World Championships	Doha, Qatar	20 years, 288 days	JWR
Total	285 kg	Liu Chunhong	China	13 November 2005	World Championships	Doha, Qatar	20 years, 288 days	
–75 kg
Snatch	131 kg	Meng Suping	China	28 November 2009	World Championships	Goyang, South Korea	20 years, 134 days	
Clean & Jerk	168 kg	Sun Dan	China	31 October 2003	Afro-Asian Games	Hyderabad, India	20 years, 276 days	
Total	296 kg	Meng Suping	China	28 November 2009	World Championships	Goyang, South Korea	20 years, 134 days	
