= List of Asian youth records in Olympic weightlifting =

This is the list of Asian youth records in Olympic weightlifting. Records are maintained in each weight class for the snatch lift, clean and jerk lift, and the total for both lifts by the Asian Weightlifting Federation (AWF).

== Current records ==
=== Men ===
Event	Record	Athlete	Nation	Date	Meet	Place	Age	Ref
55 kg
Snatch	114 kg	Asian Standard						
Clean & Jerk	138 kg	Mohammed Al-Ojaian	Saudi Arabia	7 August 2026	Asian Youth Championships	Tashkent, Uzbekistan	17 years, 48 days	
Total	247 kg	Mohammed Al-Ojaian	Saudi Arabia	7 August 2026	Asian Youth Championships	Tashkent, Uzbekistan	17 years, 48 days	
60 kg
Snatch	120 kg	Chen Xunfa	China	26 October 2025	Asian Youth Games	Sakhir, Bahrain	16 years, 242 days	
Clean & Jerk	144 kg	Jerick Icon Castro	Philippines	8 August 2026	Asian Youth Championships	Tashkent, Uzbekistan	16 years, 138 days	
Total	264 kg	Asian Standard						
65 kg
Snatch	131 kg	Beibarys Yerseit	Kazakhstan	3 May 2026	World Junior Championships	Ismailia, Egypt	17 years, 66 days	
Clean & Jerk	166 kg	Nguyễn Thành Duy	Vietnam	28 October 2026	World Championships	Ningbo, China	17 years, 244 days	
Total	296 kg	Nguyễn Thành Duy	Vietnam	28 October 2026	World Championships	Ningbo, China	17 years, 244 days	
70 kg
Snatch	134 kg	Asian Standard						
Clean & Jerk	161 kg	Asian Standard						
Total	294 kg	Asian Standard						
75 kg
Snatch	145 kg	Mohammad Javad Beyralvand	Iran	11 August 2026	Asian Youth Championships	Tashkent, Uzbekistan	16 years, 289 days	
Clean & Jerk	180 kg	Mohammad Javad Beyralvand	Iran	11 August 2026	Asian Youth Championships	Tashkent, Uzbekistan	16 years, 289 days	
Total	325 kg	Mohammad Javad Beyralvand	Iran	11 August 2026	Asian Youth Championships	Tashkent, Uzbekistan	16 years, 289 days	
85 kg
Snatch	151 kg	Asian Standard						
Clean & Jerk	182 kg	Asian Standard						
Total	332 kg	Asian Standard						
95 kg
Snatch	159 kg	Nurzhan Zhumabay	Kazakhstan	13 August 2026	Asian Youth Championships	Tashkent, Uzbekistan	15 years, 312 days	
Clean & Jerk	196 kg	Mukhammadshokir Turdaliev	Uzbekistan	13 August 2026	Asian Youth Championships	Tashkent, Uzbekistan	16 years, 274 days	
Total	354 kg	Nurzhan Zhumabay	Kazakhstan	13 August 2026	Asian Youth Championships	Tashkent, Uzbekistan	15 years, 312 days	
+95 kg
Snatch	176 kg	Taha Nojavan	Iran	13 August 2026	Asian Youth Championships	Tashkent, Uzbekistan	16 years, 86 days	
Clean & Jerk	215 kg	Taha Nojavan	Iran	13 August 2026	Asian Youth Championships	Tashkent, Uzbekistan	16 years, 86 days	
Total	391 kg	Taha Nojavan	Iran	13 August 2026	Asian Youth Championships	Tashkent, Uzbekistan	16 years, 86 days	

=== Women ===
Event	Record	Athlete	Nation	Date	Meet	Place	Age	Ref
45 kg
Snatch	74 kg	Asian Standard						
Clean & Jerk	92 kg	Asian Standard						
Total	164 kg	Asian Standard						
49 kg
Snatch	78 kg	Asian Standard						
Clean & Jerk	98 kg	Asian Standard						
Total	175 kg	Asian Standard						
53 kg
Snatch	88 kg	Pak Hae-yon	North Korea	28 October 2025	Asian Youth Games	Sakhir, Bahrain	16 years, 86 days	
Clean & Jerk	107 kg	Pak Hae-yon	North Korea	28 October 2025	Asian Youth Games	Sakhir, Bahrain	16 years, 86 days	
Total	195 kg	Pak Hae-yon	North Korea	28 October 2025	Asian Youth Games	Sakhir, Bahrain	16 years, 86 days	
57 kg
Snatch	89 kg	Şabnam Kerimbaýewa	Turkmenistan	30 October 2026	World Championships	Ningbo, China	16 years, 308 days	
Clean & Jerk	112 kg	Snezhana Kashkarova	Kazakhstan	10 August 2026	Asian Youth Championships	Tashkent, Uzbekistan	15 years, 8 days	
Total	201 kg	Şabnam Kerimbaýewa	Turkmenistan	30 October 2026	World Championships	Ningbo, China	16 years, 308 days	
61 kg
Snatch	94 kg	Xeniya Prozorova	Kazakhstan	10 August 2026	Asian Youth Championships	Tashkent, Uzbekistan	16 years, 178 days	
Clean & Jerk	114 kg	Asian Standard						
Total	204 kg	Asian Standard						
69 kg
Snatch	99 kg	Asian Standard						
Clean & Jerk	127 kg	Ri Sae-byol	North Korea	29 October 2025	Asian Youth Games	Sakhir, Bahrain	17 years, 150 days	
Total	225 kg	Ri Sae-byol	North Korea	29 October 2025	Asian Youth Games	Sakhir, Bahrain	17 years, 150 days	
77 kg
Snatch	105 kg	Asian Standard						
Clean & Jerk	133 kg	Asian Standard						
Total	237 kg	Asian Standard						
+77 kg
Snatch	125 kg	Hu Wenxun	China	8 May 2026	World Junior Championships	Ismailia, Egypt	15 years, 197 days	
Clean & Jerk	163 kg	Hu Wenxun	China	8 May 2026	World Junior Championships	Ismailia, Egypt	15 years, 197 days	
Total	288 kg	Hu Wenxun	China	8 May 2026	World Junior Championships	Ismailia, Egypt	15 years, 197 days	

== Historical records ==
=== Men (2025–2026) ===
Event	Record	Athlete	Nation	Date	Meet	Place	Age	Ref
56 kg
Snatch	114 kg	Mohammed Al-Ojaian	Saudi Arabia	5 July 2026	World Youth Championships	Cali, Colombia	17 years, 15 days	
Clean & Jerk	141 kg	Jiang Jinfu	China	26 October 2025	Asian Youth Games	Sakhir, Bahrain	16 years, 294 days	
Total	253 kg	Mohammed Al-Ojaian	Saudi Arabia	5 July 2026	World Youth Championships	Cali, Colombia	17 years, 15 days	
71 kg
Snatch	144 kg	Alikhan Askerbay	Kazakhstan	27 October 2025	Asian Youth Games	Sakhir, Bahrain	17 years, 184 days	
Clean & Jerk	172 kg	Alikhan Askerbay	Kazakhstan	27 October 2025	Asian Youth Games	Sakhir, Bahrain	17 years, 184 days	
Total	316 kg	Alikhan Askerbay	Kazakhstan	27 October 2025	Asian Youth Games	Sakhir, Bahrain	17 years, 184 days	
79 kg
Snatch	146 kg	Nurzhan Zhumabay	Kazakhstan	29 October 2025	Asian Youth Games	Sakhir, Bahrain	15 years, 24 days	
Clean & Jerk	177 kg	Didarbek Jumabaýew	Turkmenistan	29 October 2025	Asian Youth Games	Sakhir, Bahrain	17 years, 156 days	
Total	322 kg	Nurzhan Zhumabay	Kazakhstan	29 October 2025	Asian Youth Games	Sakhir, Bahrain	15 years, 24 days	
88 kg
Snatch	155 kg	Nurzhan Zhumabay	Kazakhstan	10 July 2026	World Youth Championships	Cali, Colombia	15 years, 278 days	
Clean & Jerk	193 kg	Nurzhan Zhumabay	Kazakhstan	10 July 2026	World Youth Championships	Cali, Colombia	15 years, 278 days	
Total	348 kg	Nurzhan Zhumabay	Kazakhstan	10 July 2026	World Youth Championships	Cali, Colombia	15 years, 278 days	
94 kg
Snatch	160 kg	Jhon Murillo	Bahrain	30 October 2025	Asian Youth Games	Sakhir, Bahrain	17 years, 251 days	
Clean & Jerk	191 kg	Asian Standard						
Total	351 kg	Asian Standard						
+94 kg
Snatch	169 kg	Asian Standard						
Clean & Jerk	214 kg	Asian Standard						
Total	382 kg	Asian Standard						

=== Men (2018–2025) ===
Event	Record	Athlete	Nation	Date	Meet	Place	Age	Ref
49 kg
Snatch	100 kg	Pak Myong-jin	North Korea	21 October 2019	Asian Youth & Junior Championships	Pyongyang, North Korea	16 years, 202 days	
Clean & Jerk	125 kg	Đỗ Tú Tùng	Vietnam	8 March 2019	Youth World Championships	Las Vegas, United States	15 years, 57 days	
Total	221 kg	Pak Myong-jin	North Korea	21 October 2019	Asian Youth & Junior Championships	Pyongyang, North Korea	16 years, 202 days	
55 kg
Snatch	116 kg	K'Dương	Vietnam	20 December 2024	Asian Youth Championships	Doha, Qatar	17 years, 170 days	
Clean & Jerk	146 kg	K'Dương	Vietnam	20 December 2024	Asian Youth Championships	Doha, Qatar	17 years, 170 days	
Total	262 kg	K'Dương	Vietnam	20 December 2024	Asian Youth Championships	Doha, Qatar	17 years, 170 days	
61 kg
Snatch	122 kg	A Tiêu	Vietnam	21 December 2024	Asian Youth Championships	Doha, Qatar	17 years, 189 days	
Clean & Jerk	154 kg	Muhammad Faathir	Indonesia	15 February 2020	Asian Youth & Junior Championships	Tashkent, Uzbekistan	16 years, 270 days	
Total	273 kg	Muhammad Faathir	Indonesia	15 February 2020	Asian Youth & Junior Championships	Tashkent, Uzbekistan	16 years, 270 days	
67 kg
Snatch	140 kg	Jeremy Lalrinnunga	India	20 December 2019	Qatar Cup	Doha, Qatar	17 years, 55 days	
Clean & Jerk	166 kg	Jeremy Lalrinnunga	India	20 December 2019	Qatar Cup	Doha, Qatar	17 years, 55 days	
Total	306 kg	Jeremy Lalrinnunga	India	20 December 2019	Qatar Cup	Doha, Qatar	17 years, 55 days	
73 kg
Snatch	144 kg	Mohammed Al-Marzouq	Saudi Arabia	22 September 2024	World Junior Championships	León, Spain	16 years, 363 days	
Clean & Jerk	175 kg	Akzhol Kurmanbek	Kazakhstan	23 December 2024	Asian Youth Championships	Doha, Qatar	17 years, 16 days	
Total	316 kg	Akzhol Kurmanbek	Kazakhstan	23 December 2024	Asian Youth Championships	Doha, Qatar	17 years, 16 days	
81 kg
Snatch	148 kg	Iliya Salehi	Iran	19 November 2023	Junior World Championships	Guadalajara, Mexico	17 years, 252 days	
Clean & Jerk	183 kg	Iliya Salehi	Iran	19 November 2023	Junior World Championships	Guadalajara, Mexico	17 years, 252 days	
Total	331 kg	Iliya Salehi	Iran	19 November 2023	Junior World Championships	Guadalajara, Mexico	17 years, 252 days	
89 kg
Snatch	154 kg	Bekzod Gofirjonov	Uzbekistan	23 December 2024	Asian Youth Championships	Doha, Qatar	17 years, 329 days	
Clean & Jerk	194 kg	Bekzod Gofirjonov	Uzbekistan	23 December 2024	Asian Youth Championships	Doha, Qatar	17 years, 329 days	
Total	348 kg	Bekzod Gofirjonov	Uzbekistan	23 December 2024	Asian Youth Championships	Doha, Qatar	17 years, 329 days	
96 kg
Snatch	156 kg	Rakhat Bekbolat	Kazakhstan	26 October 2019	Asian Youth & Junior Championships	Pyongyang, North Korea	15 years, 285 days	
Clean & Jerk	196 kg	Rakhat Bekbolat	Kazakhstan	26 October 2019	Asian Youth & Junior Championships	Pyongyang, North Korea	15 years, 285 days	
Total	352 kg	Rakhat Bekbolat	Kazakhstan	26 October 2019	Asian Youth & Junior Championships	Pyongyang, North Korea	15 years, 285 days	
102 kg
Snatch	173 kg	Rakhat Bekbolat	Kazakhstan	24 April 2021	Asian Championships	Tashkent, Uzbekistan	17 years, 100 days	
Clean & Jerk	213 kg	Rakhat Bekbolat	Kazakhstan	24 April 2021	Asian Championships	Tashkent, Uzbekistan	17 years, 100 days	
Total	386 kg	Rakhat Bekbolat	Kazakhstan	24 April 2021	Asian Championships	Tashkent, Uzbekistan	17 years, 100 days	
+102 kg
Snatch	176 kg	Taha Nemati	Iran	23 November 2023	Junior World Championships	Guadalajara, Mexico	17 years, 297 days	
Clean & Jerk	225 kg	Alireza Yousefi	Iran	8 June 2019	Junior World Championships	Suva, Fiji	15 years, 285 days	
Total	396 kg	Alireza Yousefi	Iran	8 June 2019	Junior World Championships	Suva, Fiji	15 years, 285 days	

=== Men (1998–2018) ===
Event	Record	Athlete	Nation	Date	Meet	Place	Age	Ref
50 kg
Snatch	102 kg	Zheng Liangrun	China	4 March 2014	Asian Youth Championships	Bang Saen, Thailand	16 years, 121 days	
Clean & Jerk	128 kg	Đỗ Tú Tùng	Vietnam	23 April 2018	Asian Youth Championships	Urgench, Uzbekistan	14 years, 103 days	
Total	227 kg	Sinphet Kruaithong	Thailand	5 September 2011	Asian Youth Championships	Pattaya, Thailand	16 years, 14 days	
56 kg
Snatch	128 kg	Meng Cheng	China	4 March 2014	Asian Youth Championships	Bang Saen, Thailand	16 years, 136 days	
Clean & Jerk	162 kg	Zhang Xiangxiang	China	16 September 2000	Olympic Games	Sydney, Australia	17 years, 62 days	
Total	287 kg	Zhang Xiangxiang	China	16 September 2000	Olympic Games	Sydney, Australia	17 years, 62 days	
62 kg
Snatch	140 kg	Wu Chao	China	4 November 2008	Asian Interclub Championships	Goyang, South Korea	16 years, 290 days	
Clean & Jerk	165 kg	Chen Lijun	China	15 June 2010	World Junior Championships	Sofia, Bulgaria	17 years, 127 days	
Total	300 kg	Wu Chao	China	4 November 2008	Asian Interclub Championships	Goyang, South Korea	16 years, 290 days	
69 kg
Snatch	144 kg	Karrar Mohammed	Iraq	9 November 2012	Asian Youth Championships	Yangon, Myanmar	17 years, 107 days	
Clean & Jerk	168 kg	Karrar Mohammed	Iraq	20 September 2012	World Youth Championships	Košice, Slovakia	17 years, 57 days	
Total	312 kg	Karrar Mohammed	Iraq	9 November 2012	Asian Youth Championships	Yangon, Myanmar	17 years, 107 days	
77 kg
Snatch	153 kg	Vladimir Sedov	Kazakhstan	21 May 2005	World Junior Championships	Busan, South Korea	17 years, 80 days	
Clean & Jerk	176 kg	Vladimir Sedov	Kazakhstan	21 May 2005	World Junior Championships	Busan, South Korea	17 years, 80 days	
Total	329 kg	Vladimir Sedov	Kazakhstan	21 May 2005	World Junior Championships	Busan, South Korea	17 years, 80 days	
85 kg
Snatch	170 kg	Ilya Ilin	Kazakhstan	14 November 2005	World Championships	Doha, Qatar	17 years, 174 days	
Clean & Jerk	216 kg	Ilya Ilin	Kazakhstan	14 November 2005	World Championships	Doha, Qatar	17 years, 174 days	
Total	386 kg	Ilya Ilin	Kazakhstan	14 November 2005	World Championships	Doha, Qatar	17 years, 174 days	
94 kg
Snatch	166 kg	Alireza Dehghan	Iran	26 October 2013	World Championships	Wrocław, Poland	16 years, 303 days	
Clean & Jerk	202 kg	Roman Russyanovskiy	Kazakhstan	23 May 2005	World Junior Championships	Busan, South Korea	16 years, 102 days	
Total	364 kg	Roman Russyanovskiy	Kazakhstan	23 May 2005	World Junior Championships	Busan, South Korea	16 years, 102 days	
+94 kg
Snatch	180 kg	Yang Zhe	China	8 December 2008	Asian Junior Championships	Jeonju, South Korea	17 years, 147 days	
Clean & Jerk	218 kg	Alireza Yousefi	Iran	13 October 2018	Youth Olympic Games	Buenos Aires, Argentina	15 years, 47 days	
Total	396 kg	Yang Zhe	China	8 December 2008	Asian Junior Championships	Jeonju, South Korea	17 years, 147 days	

=== Women (2025–2026) ===
Event	Record	Athlete	Nation	Date	Meet	Place	Age	Ref
44 kg
Snatch	72 kg	Asian Standard						
Clean & Jerk	92 kg	Priteesmita Bhoi	India	26 October 2025	Asian Youth Games	Sakhir, Bahrain	16 years, 346 days	
Total	161 kg	Asian Standard						
48 kg
Snatch	78 kg	Asian Standard						
Clean & Jerk	98 kg	Alexsandra Diaz	Philippines	5 July 2026	World Youth Championships	Cali, Colombia	15 years, 211 days	
Total	175 kg	Alexsandra Diaz	Philippines	5 July 2026	World Youth Championships	Cali, Colombia	15 years, 211 days	
58 kg
Snatch	89 kg	Asian Standard						
Clean & Jerk	112 kg	Asian Standard						
Total	201 kg	Asian Standard						
63 kg
Snatch	95 kg	Zhu Caiyun	China	28 October 2025	Asian Youth Games	Sakhir, Bahrain	17 years, 137 days	
Clean & Jerk	118 kg	Asian Standard						
Total	212 kg	Asian Standard						

=== Women (2018–2025) ===
Event	Record	Athlete	Nation	Date	Meet	Place	Age	Ref
40 kg
Snatch	62 kg	Angeline Colonia	Philippines	17 July 2022	Asian Youth & Junior Championships	Tashkent, Uzbekistan	16 years, 56 days	
Clean & Jerk	76 kg	Preetismita Bhoi	India	22 May 2024	Youth World Championships	Lima, Peru	15 years, 190 days	
Total	135 kg	Jyoshna Sabar	India	19 December 2024	Asian Youth Championships	Doha, Qatar	16 years, 55 days	
45 kg
Snatch	77 kg	Paek Hye-jong	North Korea	21 October 2019	Asian Youth & Junior Championships	Pyongyang, North Korea	16 years, 218 days	
Clean & Jerk	95 kg	Paek Hye-jong	North Korea	21 October 2019	Asian Youth & Junior Championships	Pyongyang, North Korea	16 years, 218 days	
Total	172 kg	Paek Hye-jong	North Korea	21 October 2019	Asian Youth & Junior Championships	Pyongyang, North Korea	16 years, 218 days	
49 kg
Snatch	86 kg	Windy Cantika Aisah	Indonesia	2 December 2019	Southeast Asian Games	Manila, Philippines	17 years, 174 days	
Clean & Jerk	104 kg	Windy Cantika Aisah	Indonesia	2 December 2019	Southeast Asian Games	Manila, Philippines	17 years, 133 days	
Total	190 kg	Windy Cantika Aisah	Indonesia	2 December 2019	Southeast Asian Games	Manila, Philippines	17 years, 133 days	
55 kg
Snatch	87 kg	Pak Jin-hae	North Korea	23 October 2019	Asian Youth & Junior Championships	Pyongyang, North Korea	15 years, 349 days	
Clean & Jerk	110 kg	Pak Jin-hae	North Korea	23 October 2019	Asian Youth & Junior Championships	Pyongyang, North Korea	15 years, 349 days	
Total	197 kg	Pak Jin-hae	North Korea	23 October 2019	Asian Youth & Junior Championships	Pyongyang, North Korea	15 years, 349 days	
59 kg
Snatch	99 kg	Kim Il-gyong	North Korea	23 October 2019	Asian Youth & Junior Championships	Pyongyang, North Korea	16 years, 88 days	
Clean & Jerk	129 kg	Kim Il-gyong	North Korea	23 October 2019	Asian Youth & Junior Championships	Pyongyang, North Korea	16 years, 88 days	
Total	228 kg	Kim Il-gyong	North Korea	23 October 2019	Asian Youth & Junior Championships	Pyongyang, North Korea	16 years, 88 days	
64 kg
Snatch	105 kg	Pei Xinyi	China	10 December 2022	World Championships	Bogotá, Colombia	17 years, 70 days	
Clean & Jerk	128 kg	Pei Xinyi	China	10 December 2022	World Championships	Bogotá, Colombia	17 years, 70 days	
Total	233 kg	Pei Xinyi	China	10 December 2022	World Championships	Bogotá, Colombia	17 years, 70 days	
71 kg
Snatch	100 kg	Lin Jingwei	China	3 May 2025	World Youth Championships	Lima, Peru	17 years, 98 days	
Clean & Jerk	131 kg	Lin Jingwei	China	3 May 2025	World Youth Championships	Lima, Peru	17 years, 98 days	
Total	231 kg	Lin Jingwei	China	3 May 2025	World Youth Championships	Lima, Peru	17 years, 98 days	
76 kg
Snatch	105 kg	Tursunoy Jabborova	Uzbekistan	25 October 2019	Asian Youth & Junior Championships	Pyongyang, North Korea	17 years, 235 days	
Clean & Jerk	130 kg	Jeon Hee-soo	South Korea	24 September 2024	World Junior Championships	León, Spain	17 years, 187 days	
Total	232 kg	Jeon Hee-soo	South Korea	24 September 2024	World Junior Championships	León, Spain	17 years, 187 days	
81 kg
Snatch	105 kg	Wakana Nagashima	Japan	12 December 2023	IWF Grand Prix	Doha, Qatar	17 years, 304 days	
Clean & Jerk	135 kg	Wakana Nagashima	Japan	10 May 2023	Asian Championships	Jinju, South Korea	17 years, 88 days	
Total	236 kg	Wakana Nagashima	Japan	12 December 2023	IWF Grand Prix	Doha, Qatar	17 years, 304 days	
+81 kg
Snatch	110 kg	Park Hye-jeong	South Korea	27 October 2019	Asian Youth & Junior Championships	Pyongyang, North Korea	16 years, 229 days	
Clean & Jerk	145 kg	Park Hye-jeong	South Korea	27 October 2019	Asian Youth & Junior Championships	Pyongyang, North Korea	16 years, 229 days	
Total	255 kg	Park Hye-jeong	South Korea	27 October 2019	Asian Youth & Junior Championships	Pyongyang, North Korea	16 years, 229 days	

=== Women (1998–2018) ===
Event	Record	Athlete	Nation	Date	Meet	Place	Age	Ref
44 kg
Snatch	75 kg	Huang Yeuzhen	China	26 July 2006		Gunsan, South Korea	16 years, 77 days	
Clean & Jerk	93 kg	Ri Song-gum	North Korea	4 March 2014	Asian Youth Championships	Bang Saen, Thailand	16 years, 138 days	
Total	166 kg	Huang Yeuzhen	China	26 July 2006		Gunsan, South Korea	16 years, 77 days	
48 kg
Snatch	92 kg	Wang Mingjuan	China	19 November 2002	World Championships	Warsaw, Poland	17 years, 39 days	
Clean & Jerk	116 kg	Tian Yuan	China	17 September 2010	World Championships	Antalya, Turkey	17 years, 231 days	
Total	207 kg	Wang Mingjuan	China	19 November 2002	World Championships	Warsaw, Poland	17 years, 39 days	
53 kg
Snatch	98 kg	Li Ping	China	10 November 2005	World Championships	Doha, Qatar	17 years, 56 days	
Clean & Jerk	129 kg	Zulfiya Chinshanlo	Kazakhstan	22 November 2009	World Championships	Goyang, South Korea	16 years, 120 days	
Total	224 kg	Li Ping	China	10 November 2005	World Championships	Doha, Qatar	17 years, 56 days	
58 kg
Snatch	110 kg	Deng Wei	China	17 August 2010	Youth Olympic Games	Singapore	17 years, 184 days	
Clean & Jerk	135 kg	Deng Wei	China	19 September 2010	World Championships	Antalya, Turkey	17 years, 217 days	
Total	242 kg	Deng Wei	China	17 August 2010	Youth Olympic Games	Singapore	17 years, 184 days	
63 kg
Snatch	104 kg	Rim Jong-sim	North Korea	20 September 2010	World Championships	Antalya, Turkey	17 years, 227 days	
Clean & Jerk	127 kg	Rim Jong-sim	North Korea	20 September 2010	World Championships	Antalya, Turkey	17 years, 227 days	
Total	231 kg	Rim Jong-sim	North Korea	20 September 2010	World Championships	Antalya, Turkey	17 years, 227 days	
69 kg
Snatch	107 kg	Mönkhjantsangiin Ankhtsetseg	Mongolia	13 November 2014	World Championships	Almaty, Kazakhstan	16 years, 323 days	
Clean & Jerk	148 kg	Liu Chunhong	China	6 October 2002	Asian Games	Busan, South Korea	17 years, 250 days	
Total	262 kg	Liu Chunhong	China	6 October 2002	Asian Games	Busan, South Korea	17 years, 250 days	
+69 kg
Snatch	123 kg	Nadezhda Nogay	Kazakhstan	24 September 2012	World Youth Championships	Košice, Slovakia	16 years, 126 days	
Clean & Jerk	151 kg	Nadezhda Nogay	Kazakhstan	14 May 2011	World Youth Championships	Lima, Peru	14 years, 359 days	
Total	272 kg	Nadezhda Nogay	Kazakhstan	14 May 2011	World Youth Championships	Lima, Peru	14 years, 359 days	
