= 2024 Asian Youth & Junior Weightlifting Championships =

International weightlifting competition

- Host city: Doha, Qatar
- Dates: 19-25 December
- Main venue: Radisson Blu Hotel

The 2024 Asian Youth & Junior Weightlifting Championships were held at Doha, Qatar from 19 to 25 December.

== Medal summary ==
=== Junior men's ===
Event	Gold		Silver		Bronze	
55 kg
Snatch	Dương K Vietnam	116 kg	Do Tu Tung; Vietnam	115 kg	Prince Keil B. Delos Santos; Philippines	110 kg
Clean & Jerk	Dương K Vietnam	146 kg	Do Tu Tung; Vietnam	145 kg	Prince Keil B. Delos Santos (Philippines)	132 kg
Total	Dương K Vietnam	262 kg	Do Tu Tung; Vietnam	260 kg	Prince Keil B. Delos Santos (Philippines)	242 kg
61 kg
Snatch	A Tiêu; Vietnam	122 kg	Aljasim Aqeel Abdullah A Saudi Arabia	121 kg	Sergey Chuyev; Kazakhstan	118 kg
Clean & Jerk	A Tiêu; Vietnam	149 kg	Duong Tuan Kiet; Vietnam	148 kg	Aljasim Aqeel Abdullah A Saudi Arabia	147 kg
Total	A Tiêu; Vietnam	271 kg	Aljasim Aqeel Abdullah A Saudi Arabia	268 kg	Shankar Lapung; India	262 kg
67 kg
Snatch	Tran Minh Tri; Vietnam	141 kg	Ruzmetov Diyorbek; Uzbekistan	140 kg	Babur Amangeldiyev; Turkmenistan	128 kg
Clean & Jerk	Tran Minh Tri; Vietnam	171 kg	Ruzmetov Diyorbek; Uzbekistan	170 kg	Patsaphong Thongsuk; Thailand	163 kg
Total	Tran Minh Tri; Vietnam	312 kg	Ruzmetov Diyorbek; Uzbekistan	310 kg	Patsaphong Thongsuk; Thailand	289 kg
73 kg
Snatch	Park Ju Hyeon; South Korea	145 kg	Abdulaziz Alimjanov; Uzbekistan	144 kg	Boburmirzo Yokubov; Uzbekistan	136 kg
Clean & Jerk	Abdulaziz Alimjanov; Uzbekistan	185 kg	Kim Jungmin; South Korea	173 kg	Didarbek Jumnabayev; Turkmenistan	171 kg
Total	Abdulaziz Alimjanov; Uzbekistan	329 kg	Park Ju Hyeon; South Korea	325 kg	Kim Jungmin; South Korea	301 kg
81 kg
Snatch	Khasanboy Bardiev; Uzbekistan	156 kg	Valluri Ajaya Babu; India	147 kg	A Fakhri Yousef Almedarham; Saudi Arabia	146 kg
Clean & Jerk	Nasuriwong Worrapot; Thailand	188 kg	Khasanboy Bardiev; Uzbekistan	187 kg	Alibek Rakhymberdi; Kazakhstan	184 kg
Total	Khasanboy Bardiev; Uzbekistan	343 kg	Nasuriwong Worrapot; Thailand	333 kg	Alibek Rakhymberdi; Kazakhstan	330 kg
89 kg
Snatch	Alexey Churkin; Kazakhstan	163 kg	Iliya Salehipour; Iran	161 kg	Alireza Abbaspour; Iran	159 kg
Clean & Jerk	Alexey Churkin; Kazakhstan	197 kg	Alireza Abbaspour; Iran	196 kg	Iliya Salehipour; Iran	195 kg
Total	Alexey Churkin; Kazakhstan	360 kg	Iliya Salehipour; Iran	356 kg	Alireza Abbaspour; Iran	355 kg
96 kg
Snatch	Sepah Amir Hossein; Iran	162 kg	Denis Poluboyarinov; Kazakhstan	161 kg	Mohammad Esfandiari; Iran	152 kg
Clean & Jerk	Denis Poluboyarinov; Kazakhstan	205 kg	Sepah Amir Hossein; Iran	187 kg	Mohammad Esfandiari; Iran	182 kg
Total	Denis Poluboyarinov; Kazakhstan	366 kg	Sepah Amir Hossein; Iran	349 kg	Mohammad Esfandiari; Iran	334 kg
102 kg
Snatch	Shahzadbek Matyakubov; Turkmenistan	177 kg	Abolfazl Zare; Iran	172 kg	Alireza Nasiri; Iran	171 kg
Clean & Jerk	Shahzadbek Matyakubov; Turkmenistan	219 kg WJR	Alireza Nasiri; Iran	218 kg	Abolfazl Zare; Iran	194 kg
Total	Shahzadbek Matyakubov; Turkmenistan	396 kg WJR	Alireza Nasiri; Iran	389 kg	Abolfazl Zare; Iran	366 kg
109 kg
Snatch	Ariya Paydar; Iran	169 kg	Salimjonov Kudratbek; Uzbekistan	168 kg	Hassan Emadi; Iran	164 kg
Clean & Jerk	Ariya Paydar; Iran	211 kg	A'Sem Mousa Husam Alsallj; Jordan	196 kg	Hassan Emadi; Iran	195 kg
Total	Ariya Paydar; Iran	380 kg	Hassan Emadi; Iran	359 kg	Salimjonov Kudratbek; Uzbekistan	358 kg
+109 kg
Snatch	Ali Rubaiawi; Iraq	180 kg	Hamidreza Mohammadi Tanha; Iran	177 kg	Omadillo Olimov; Uzbekistan	156 kg
Clean & Jerk	Ali Rubaiawi; Iraq	226 kg	Hamidreza Mohammadi Tanha; Iran	225 kg	Omadillo Olimov; Uzbekistan	205 kg
Total	Ali Rubaiawi; Iraq	406 kg	Hamidreza Mohammadi Tanha; Iran	402 kg	Omadillo Olimov; Uzbekistan	361 kg

=== Junior women's ===
Event	Gold		Silver		Bronze	
45 kg
Snatch	Khemika Kamnoedsri; Thailand	74 kg	Rose Jean Ramos; Philippines	73 kg	Angeline L. Colonia; Philippines	72 kg
Clean & Jerk	Khemika Kamnoedsri; Thailand	90 kg	Tran Thi Bac Giang; Vietnam	87 kg	Payal; India	85 kg
Total	Khemika Kamnoedsri; Thailand	164 kg	Angeline L. Colonia; Philippines	157 kg	Payal; India	155 kg
49 kg
Snatch	Amanova Ogulshat; Turkmenistan	79 kg	Lovely V. Inan; Philippines	78 kg	Naruemol Vonghajak; Thailand	76 kg
Clean & Jerk	Y Lien; Vietnam	101 kg	Amanova Ogulshat; Turkmenistan	97 kg	Naruemol Vonghajak; Thailand	95 kg
Total	Y Lien; Vietnam	177 kg	Amanova Ogulshat; Turkmenistan	176 kg	Naruemol Vonghajak; Thailand	171 kg
55 kg
Snatch	Chen Guan-ling; Chinese Taipei	94 kg	Lamabam Nilam Devi; India	86 kg	Natcha Kaewnoi; Thailand	86 kg
Clean & Jerk	Chen Guan-ling; Chinese Taipei	120 kg AJR	Lamabam Nilam Devi; India	104 kg	Natcha Kaewnoi; Thailand	103 kg
Total	Chen Guan-ling; Chinese Taipei	214 kg	Lamabam Nilam Devi; India	190 kg	Natcha Kaewnoi; Thailand	189 kg
59 kg
Snatch	Thanaporn Saetia; Thailand	96 kg	Nigora Abdullaeva; Uzbekistan	93 kg	Sarah; Indonesia	88 kg
Clean & Jerk	Thanaporn Saetia; Thailand	112 kg	Sarah; Indonesia	111 kg	Nigora Abdullaeva; Uzbekistan	110 kg
Total	Thanaporn Saetia; Thailand	202 kg	Nigora Abdullaeva; Uzbekistan	201 kg	Sarah; Indonesia	200 kg
64 kg
Snatch	Kakamyradova Gulalek; Turkmenistan	92 kg	Khudoykulova Ziyoda; Uzbekistan	92 kg	Amanova Medine; Turkmenistan	92 kg
Clean & Jerk	Tian Xin-Jie; Chinese Taipei	112 kg	Lee En-Yun; Chinese Taipei	111 kg	Kakamyradova Gulalek; Turkmenistan	110 kg
Total	Kakamyradova Gulalek; Turkmenistan	202 kg	Amanova Medine; Turkmenistan	201 kg	Lee En-Yun; Chinese Taipei	200 kg
71 kg
Snatch	Phattharathida Wongsing; Thailand	97 kg	Indah Afriza; Indonesia	96 kg	Reihaneh Karimi; Iran	91 kg
Clean & Jerk	Phattharathida Wongsing; Thailand	121 kg	Indah Afriza; Indonesia	120 kg	Reihaneh Karimi; Iran	118 kg
Total	Phattharathida Wongsing; Thailand	221 kg	Indah Afriza; Indonesia	219 kg	Reihaneh Karimi; Iran	211 kg
76 kg
Snatch	Zhumagali Ayanat; Kazakhstan	94 kg	Dadamirzaeva Gulshodakhon; Uzbekistan	91 kg	Chiang Sin-Yueh; Chinese Taipei	90 kg
Clean & Jerk	Zhumagali Ayanat; Kazakhstan	121 kg	Sanjana; India	120 kg	Dadamirzaeva Gulshodakhon; Uzbekistan	118 kg
Total	Zhumagali Ayanat; Kazakhstan	215 kg	Sanjana; India	210 kg	Dadamirzaeva Gulshodakhon; Uzbekistan	209 kg
81 kg
Snatch	Suvonova Nigora; Uzbekistan	93 kg	Viktoriya Novikova; Kazakhstan	92 kg	Saniya Ormanbayeva; Kazakhstan	91 kg
Clean & Jerk	Suvonova Nigora; Uzbekistan	121 kg	Viktoriya Novikova; Kazakhstan	120 kg	Saniya Ormanbayeva; Kazakhstan	118 kg
Total	Suvonova Nigora; Uzbekistan	214 kg	Viktoriya Novikova; Kazakhstan	212 kg	Saniya Ormanbayeva; Kazakhstan	209 kg
87 kg
Snatch	Anamjan Rustamova; Turkmenistan	103 kg	Maghsoodi Kizhan; Iran	94 kg	Akerke Baimanap; Kazakhstan	91 kg
Clean & Jerk	Anamjan Rustamova; Turkmenistan	135 kg	Maghsoodi Kizhan; Iran	115 kg	Akerke Baimanap; Kazakhstan	115 kg
Total	Anamjan Rustamova; Turkmenistan	238 kg	Maghsoodi Kizhan; Iran	209 kg	Akerke Baimanap; Kazakhstan	206 kg
+87 kg
Snatch	Yu Hyebin; South Korea	101 kg	Safaverdi Sara; Iran	100 kg	Maibam Martina Devi; India	96 kg
Clean & Jerk	Yu Hyebin; South Korea	130 kg	Maibam Martina Devi; India	129 kg	Tran Thi Hien; Vietnam	126 kg
Total	Yu Hyebin; South Korea	231 kg	Maibam Martina Devi; India	225 kg	Tran Thi Hien; Vietnam	220 kg

=== Youth men's ===
Event	Gold		Silver		Bronze	
49 kg
Snatch	Borres Eron B. Philippines	97 kg	Colonia Aldrin; Philippines	95 kg	Đạo Bùi Minh; Vietnam	90 kg
Clean & Jerk	Colonia Aldrin; Philippines	118 kg	Đạo Bùi Minh; Vietnam	114 kg	Meethuan Chakkarin; Thailand	110 kg
Total	Colonia Aldrin; Philippines	213 kg	Đạo Bùi Minh; Vietnam	204 kg	Babulal Hembrom; India	197 kg
55 kg
Snatch	Dương K'; Vietnam	116 kg WYR	Prince Keil B. Santos Delos; Philippines	110 kg	The Hung Van; Vietnam	108 kg
Clean & Jerk	Dương K'; Vietnam	146 kg WYR	Prince Keil B. Santos Delos; Philippines	132 kg	The Hung Van; Vietnam	131 kg
Total	Dương K'; Vietnam	262 kg WYR	Prince Keil B. Santos Delos; Philippines	242 kg	The Hung Van; Vietnam	239 kg
61 kg
Snatch	Tieu A Vietnam	122 kg AYR	Sang Thach Hoang; Vietnam	111 kg	Abdullah Ibrahim Almohaimeed; Saudi Arabia	110 kg
Clean & Jerk	Tieu A Vietnam	149 kg	Sang Thach Hoang; Vietnam	148 kg	Abdullah Ibrahim Almohaimeed; Saudi Arabia	137 kg
Total	Tieu A Vietnam	271 kg	Sang Thach Hoang; Vietnam	259 kg	Abdullah Ibrahim Almohaimeed; Saudi Arabia	247 kg
67 kg
Snatch	Alikhan Askerbai; Kazakhstan	133 kg	Yersultan Turssynbekov; Kazakhstan	128 kg	Tung A Vietnam	127 kg
Clean & Jerk	Mehrab Davasari; Iran	160 kg	Tung A Vietnam	155 kg	Alikhan Askerbai; Kazakhstan	151 kg
Total	Alikhan Askerbai; Kazakhstan	284 kg	Mehrab Davasari; Iran	283 kg	A Tung; Vietnam	282 kg
73 kg
Snatch	Akzhol Kurmanbek; Kazakhstan	141 kg	Bekhruzbek Ganjaboev; Uzbekistan	136 kg	Boburmirzo Yokubov; Uzbekistan	136 kg
Clean & Jerk	Akzhol Kurmanbek; Kazakhstan	175 kg WYR	Didarbek Jumnabayev (Turkmenistan)	171 kg	Alhalyu Mohammed Essa; Saudi Arabia	166 kg
Total	Akzhol Kurmanbek; Kazakhstan	316 kg WYR	Boburmirzo Yokubov; Uzbekistan	300 kg	Didarbek Jumnabayev; Turkmenistan	298 kg
81 kg
Snatch	Amirmohammad Rahmati; Iran	140 kg	Sairaj Pardeshi; India	139 kg	Alzawri Mohammed Ali; Saudi Arabia	134 kg
Clean & Jerk	Alzawri Mohammed Ali; Saudi Arabia	172 kg	Sairaj Pardeshi; India	171 kg	Amirmohammad Rahmati; Iran	167 kg
Total	Sairaj Pardeshi; India	310 kg	Amirmohammad Rahmati; Iran	307 kg	Alzawri Mohammed Ali; Saudi Arabia	306 kg
89 kg
Snatch	Bekzod Gofirjonov; Uzbekistan	154 kg AYR	Nodirbek Juraev; Uzbekistan	139 kg	Akmyradov Islam; Turkmenistan	133 kg
Clean & Jerk	Bekzod Gofirjonov; Uzbekistan	194 kg WYR	Nodirbek Juraev; Uzbekistan	175 kg	Akmyradov Islam; Turkmenistan	163 kg
Total	Bekzod Gofirjonov; Uzbekistan	348 kg AYR	Nodirbek Juraev; Uzbekistan	314 kg	Akmyradov Islam; Turkmenistan	296 kg
96 kg
Snatch	Rakhmatjonov Ruslan; Uzbekistan	151 kg	Hamidreza Zarei; Iran	146 kg	Alkateb Mohamad; Syria	141 kg
Clean & Jerk	Hamidreza Zarei; Iran	188 kg	Rakhmatjonov Ruslan; Uzbekistan	180 kg	Parv Chaudhary; India	168 kg
Total	Hamidreza Zarei; Iran	334 kg	Rakhmatjonov Ruslan; Uzbekistan	331 kg	Parv Chaudhary; India	303 kg
102 kg
Snatch	Suleyman Jafarov; Turkmenistan	150 kg	Kim Mingeun; South Korea	145 kg	Hazim Dawood Ali Al-Lam; Iraq	144 kg
Clean & Jerk	Hazim Dawood Ali Al-Lam; Iraq	183 kg	Suleyman Jafarov; Turkmenistan	176 kg	Ansar Tursymbek; Kazakhstan	170 kg
Total	Hazim Dawood Ali Al-Lam; Iraq	327 kg	Suleyman Jafarov; Turkmenistan	326 kg	Kim Mingeun; South Korea	314 kg
+102 kg
Snatch	Omadillo Olimov; Uzbekistan	156 kg	Guan-Ting Ke; Chinese Taipei	143 kg	Sagynbek Samarkan; Kazakhstan	142 kg
Clean & Jerk	Omadillo Olimov; Uzbekistan	205 kg	Guan-Ting Ke; Chinese Taipei	193 kg	Sagynbek Samarkan; Kazakhstan	182 kg
Total	Omadillo Olimov; Uzbekistan	361 kg	Guan-Ting Ke; Chinese Taipei	336 kg	Sagynbek Samarkan; Kazakhstan	324 kg

=== Youth women's ===
Event	Gold		Silver		Bronze	
40 kg
Snatch	Jyoshna Sabar; India	60 kg	Althea P. Bacaro; Philippines	55 kg	Jay Ann Diaz; Philippines	53 kg
Clean & Jerk	Jyoshna Sabar; India	75 kg	Hoang Khanh; Vietnam	73 kg	Althea P. Bacaro; Philippines	73 kg
Total	Jyoshna Sabar; India	135 kg AYR	Althea P. Bacaro; Philippines	128 kg	Hoang Khanh; Vietnam	125 kg
45 kg
Snatch	Payal; India	70 kg	Ka Hoai; Vietnam	66 kg	Alexsandra A. Diaz; Philippines	65 kg
Clean & Jerk	Ka Hoai; Vietnam	86 kg	Priteesmita Bhoi; India	85 kg	Payal; India	85 kg
Total	Payal; India	155 kg	Ka Hoai; Vietnam	152 kg	Alexsandra A. Diaz; Philippines	148 kg
49 kg
Snatch	Amanova Ogulshat; Turkmenistan	79 kg	Y Lien; Vietnam	76 kg	Rosalinda Faustino; Philippines	70 kg
Clean & Jerk	Y Lien; Vietnam	101 kg	Amanova Ogulshat; Turkmenistan	97 kg	Asmita Dhone; India	94 kg
Total	Y Lien; Vietnam	177 kg	Amanova Ogulshat; Turkmenistan	176 kg	Rosalinda Faustino; Philippines	163 kg
55 kg
Snatch	Jhodie A Peralta; Philippines	84 kg	Luong Thi Thanh Tuyen; Vietnam	80 kg	Koyel Bar; India	79 kg
Clean & Jerk	Koyel Bar; India	103 kg	Jhodie A Peralta; Philippines	100 kg	Phuttharak Waiphod; Thailand	99 kg
Total	Jhodie A Peralta; Philippines	184 kg	Koyel Bar; India	182 kg	Luong Thi Thanh Tuyen; Vietnam	178 kg
59 kg
Snatch	Marjona Abdumutalova; Uzbekistan	84 kg	Darya Balabayuk; Kazakhstan	83 kg	Hurmenova Mayagozel; Turkmenistan	73 kg
Clean & Jerk	Marjona Abdumutalova; Uzbekistan	103 kg	Darya Balabayuk; Kazakhstan	102 kg	Keshtkar Maryam; Iran	94 kg
Total	Marjona Abdumutalova; Uzbekistan	187 kg	Darya Balabayuk; Kazakhstan	185 kg	Nursuila Berikbol; Kazakhstan	165 kg
64 kg
Snatch	Lee Dayeon; South Korea	85 kg	Altynai Tanibergenova; Kazakhstan	84 kg	Zulfiya Ramazonova; Uzbekistan	83 kg
Clean & Jerk	Lee Dayeon; South Korea	108 kg	Altynai Tanibergenova; Kazakhstan	108 kg	Seyedeh Zahra Hossein; Iran	101 kg
Total	Dayeon Lee; South Korea	193 kg	Altynai Tanibergenova; Kazakhstan	192 kg	Seyedeh Zahra Hossein; Iran	183 kg
71 kg
Snatch	Kira Danilova; Kazakhstan	89 kg	Sedeh Haniyeh Sharifi; Iran	88 kg	Bibinur Yssmynova; Kazakhstan	75 kg
Clean & Jerk	Sedeh Haniyeh Sharifi; Iran	112 kg	Kira Danilova; Kazakhstan	110 kg	Bibinur Yssmynova; Kazakhstan	95 kg
Total	Sedeh Haniyeh Sharifi; Iran	200 kg	Kira Danilova; Kazakhstan	199 kg	Bibinur Yssmynova; Kazakhstan	170 kg
76 kg
Snatch	Ayanat Zhumagali; Kazakhstan	94 kg	Sanjana; India	90 kg	Aruzhan Yerimbet; Kazakhstan	79 kg
Clean & Jerk	Ayanat Zhumagali; Kazakhstan	121 kg	Sanjana; India	120 kg	Aruzhan Yerimbet; Kazakhstan	95 kg
Total	Ayanat Zhumagali; Kazakhstan	215 kg	Sanjana; India	210 kg	Aruzhan Yerimbet; Kazakhstan	174 kg
81 kg
Snatch	Saniya Ormanbayeva; Kazakhstan	91 kg	Anh Nhu Nguyen; Vietnam	90 kg	Tong Wang; Chinese Taipei	88 kg
Clean & Jerk	Saniya Ormanbayeva; Kazakhstan	118 kg	K Oviya; India	109 kg	Anh Nhu Nguyen; Vietnam	107 kg
Total	Saniya Ormanbayeva; Kazakhstan	209 kg	Anh Nhu Nguyen; Vietnam	197 kg	Asal Kadkhodaei; Iran	193 kg
+81 kg
Snatch	Lee Haeun; South Korea	97 kg	Thi Hien Tran; Vietnam	94 kg	Seyedeh Masoumeh Hosseini; Iran	86 kg
Clean & Jerk	Lee Haeun; South Korea	130 kg	Thi Hien Tran; Vietnam	126 kg	Sheng-Ci Su; Chinese Taipei	122 kg
Total	Lee Haeun; South Korea	227 kg	Thi Hien Tran; Vietnam	220 kg	Sheng-Ci Su; Chinese Taipei	207 kg

== Medal table ==
=== Junior ===
Ranking by Big (Total result) medals

* Host nation (Qatar)

Junior Section Medal Tally – 2024 Asian Youth & Junior Weightlifting Championships
Rank	Nation	Gold	Silver	Bronze	Total
1	Vietnam	4	1	1	6
2	Uzbekistan	3	2	3	8
3	Turkmenistan	3	2	0	5
4	Kazakhstan	3	1	3	7
4	Thailand	3	1	3	7
6	Iran	1	6	4	11
7	South Korea	1	1	1	3
8	Chinese Taipei	1	0	1	2
9	Iraq	1	0	0	1
10	India	0	3	2	5
11	Indonesia	0	1	1	2
11	Philippines	0	1	1	2
13	Saudi Arabia	0	1	0	1
Totals (13 entries)		20	20	20	60

Ranking by all medals: Big (Total result) and Small (Snatch and Clean & Jerk)

* Host nation (Qatar)

Rank	Nation	Gold	Silver	Bronze	Total
1	Vietnam	11	5	2	18
2	Thailand	10	1	8	19
3	Turkmenistan	9	3	4	16
4	Kazakhstan	8	4	9	21
5	Uzbekistan	7	10	8	25
6	Iran	4	16	14	34
7	South Korea	4	2	1	7
8	Chinese Taipei	4	1	2	7
9	Iraq	3	0	0	3
10	India	0	8	4	12
11	Indonesia	0	4	2	6
12	Philippines	0	3	4	7
13	Saudi Arabia	0	2	2	4
14	Jordan	0	1	0	1
Totals (14 entries)		60	60	60	180

=== Youth ===
Ranking by Big (Total result) medals

Medal Tally
Rank	Nation	Gold	Silver	Bronze	Total
1	Kazakhstan	4	3	4	11
2	Vietnam	3	5	4	12
3	Uzbekistan	3	3	0	6
4	India	3	2	2	7
5	Iran	2	2	2	6
5	Philippines	2	2	2	6
7	South Korea	2	0	1	3
8	Iraq	1	0	0	1
9	Turkmenistan	0	2	2	4
10	Chinese Taipei	0	1	1	2
11	Saudi Arabia	0	0	2	2
12	Indonesia	0	0	0	0
12	Thailand	0	0	0	0
Totals (13 entries)		20	20	20	60

Ranking by all medals: Big (Total result) and Small (Snatch and Clean & Jerk)

* Host nation (Qatar)

Rank	Nation	Gold	Silver	Bronze	Total
1	Kazakhstan	12	9	12	33
2	Uzbekistan	10	7	2	19
3	Vietnam	9	16	9	34
4	India	7	8	6	21
5	Iran	6	4	6	16
6	South Korea	6	1	1	8
7	Philippines	5	7	6	18
8	Turkmenistan	2	5	5	12
9	Iraq	2	0	2	4
10	Saudi Arabia	1	0	5	6
11	Chinese Taipei	0	3	3	6
12	Thailand	0	0	2	2
13	Syria	0	0	1	1
Totals (13 entries)		60	60	60	180

== Team ranking ==
=== Junior ===
==== Men ====
Rank	Team	Points
1	Iran	727/10
2	Uzbekistan	684/10
3	Saudi Arabia	594/10

==== Women ====
Rank	Team	Points
1	Kazakhstan	598/9
2	Chinese Taipei	586/9
3	India	584/9

=== Youth ===
==== Men ====
Rank	Team	Points
1	Saudi Arabia	575/9
2	Vietnam	519/7
2	Uzbekistan	519/7
3	Kazakhstan	477/8

==== Women ====
Rank	Team	Points
1	Kazakhstan	656/9
2	Vietnam	574/8
3	India	572/8
