= 2026 Asian Youth & Junior Weightlifting Championships =

International weightlifting competition

- Host city: Tashkent, Uzbekistan
- Dates: 7–14 August
- Main venue: The Complex of Martial Arts, New Uzbekistan Olympic Town

The 2026 Asian Youth & Junior Weightlifting Championships were held in Tashkent, Uzkekistan from 7 to 14 August.

== History ==
https://intersportstats.com/competition_types/580 (Youth 1999-2001)

https://intersportstats.com/competition_types/579 (Junior 1983-2001)

Youth & Junior - Since 2002

== Medal summary ==
=== Junior men's ===
Event	Gold		Silver		Bronze	
60 kg
Snatch	Prince Keil Delos Santos; Philippines	120 kg	Gurunaidu Sanapathi; India	119 kg	Tomchou Meetei Nameirakpam; India	116 kg
Clean & Jerk	Tomchou Meetei Nameirakpam; India	150 kg	Gurunaidu Sanapathi; India	146 kg	Prince Keil Delos Santos; Philippines	144 kg
Total	Tomchou Meetei Nameirakpam; India	266 kg	Gurunaidu Sanapathi; India	265 kg	Prince Keil Delos Santos; Philippines	264 kg
65 kg
Snatch	Thạch Hoàng Sang; Vietnam	134 kg	A Tiêu; Vietnam	130 kg	Beibarys Yerseit; Kazakhstan	129 kg
Clean & Jerk	Thạch Hoàng Sang; Vietnam	157 kg	Maharajan Arumugapandian; India	157 kg	Kim Yo-han; South Korea	156 kg
Total	Thạch Hoàng Sang; Vietnam	291 kg	Maharajan Arumugapandian; India	285 kg	Beibarys Yerseit; Kazakhstan	281 kg
70 kg
Snatch	Albert Delos Santos; Philippines	141 kg	Yash Vinod Khandagale; India	140 kg	Yersultan Tursynbekov; Kazakhstan	136 kg
Clean & Jerk	Albert Delos Santos; Philippines	180 kg WJR	Mehrab Davasari; Iran	165 kg	Jang Seo-jin; South Korea	159 kg
Total	Albert Delos Santos; Philippines	321 kg WJR	Mehrab Davasari; Iran	299 kg	Yash Vinod Khandagale; India	298 kg
75 kg
Snatch	Mohammad Javad Beiranvand; Iran	145 kg	Nurassyl Arapbay; Kazakhstan	137 kg	Nurillo Davlatboev; Uzbekistan	136 kg
Clean & Jerk	Mohammad Javad Beiranvand; Iran	180 kg	Yoon Jin-myeong; South Korea	172 kg	Erbol Sarpashev; Kyrgyzstan	170 kg
Total	Mohammad Javad Beiranvand; Iran	325 kg	Yoon Jin-myeong; South Korea	307 kg	Nurillo Davlatboev; Uzbekistan	306 kg
85 kg
Snatch	Khikmatillo Khaydarov; Uzbekistan	161 kg AJR	Akzhol Kurmanbek; Kazakhstan	160 kg	Galkan Rahmanow; Turkmenistan	155 kg
Clean & Jerk	Akzhol Kurmanbek; Kazakhstan	198 kg	Yerasyl Saulebekov; Kazakhstan	197 kg	Khikmatillo Khaydarov; Uzbekistan	196 kg
Total	Akzhol Kurmanbek; Kazakhstan	358 kg AJR	Khikmatillo Khaydarov; Uzbekistan	357 kg	Yerasyl Saulebekov; Kazakhstan	351 kg
95 kg
Snatch	Hamid Reza Zareei; Iran	164 kg	Alikhan Askerbay; Kazakhstan	163 kg	Nurzhan Zhumabay; Kazakhstan	159 kg
Clean & Jerk	Hamid Reza Zareei; Iran	214 kg WJR	Bekzod Gofirjonov; Uzbekistan	205 kg	Alikhan Askerbay; Kazakhstan	198 kg
Total	Hamid Reza Zareei; Iran	378 kg	Bekzod Gofirjonov; Uzbekistan	362 kg	Alikhan Askerbay; Kazakhstan	361 kg
110 kg
Snatch	Farhad Gholizadeh; Iran	172 kg	Jhon López; Bahrain	170 kg	Lee Jun-seok; South Korea	160 kg
Clean & Jerk	Farhad Gholizadeh; Iran	210 kg	Lee Jun-seok; South Korea	209 kg	Jhon López; Bahrain	201 kg
Total	Farhad Gholizadeh; Iran	382 kg	Jhon López; Bahrain	371 kg	Lee Jun-seok; South Korea	369 kg
+110 kg
Snatch	Ali Mohamad; Syria	182 kg	Taha Nojavan; Iran	176 kg	Taha Nemati; Iran	173 kg
Clean & Jerk	Omadillo Olimov; Uzbekistan	223 kg	Taha Nemati; Iran	219 kg	Taha Nojavan; Iran	215 kg
Total	Omadillo Olimov; Uzbekistan	393 kg	Taha Nemati; Iran	392 kg	Taha Nojavan; Iran	391 kg

=== Junior women's ===
Event	Gold		Silver		Bronze	
49 kg
Snatch	Angeline Colonia; Philippines	80 kg	Naruemol Vonghajak; Thailand	77 kg	Alexsandra Ann Diaz; Philippines	77 kg
Clean & Jerk	Naruemol Vonghajak; Thailand	101 kg	Angeline Colonia; Philippines	93 kg	Ka Hoai; Vietnam	93 kg
Total	Naruemol Vonghajak; Thailand	178 kg	Angeline Colonia; Philippines	173 kg	Alexsandra Ann Diaz; Philippines	169 kg
53 kg
Snatch	Jhodie Peralta; Philippines	86 kg	Şabnam Kerimbaýewa; Turkmenistan	83 kg	Natcha Kaewnoi; Thailand	82 kg
Clean & Jerk	Natcha Kaewnoi; Thailand	107 kg	Şabnam Kerimbaýewa; Turkmenistan	103 kg	Y Liên; Vietnam	102 kg
Total	Natcha Kaewnoi; Thailand	189 kg	Jhodie Peralta; Philippines	188 kg	Şabnam Kerimbaýewa; Turkmenistan	186 kg
57 kg
Snatch	Marjona Abdumutalova; Uzbekistan	90 kg	Snezhana Kashkarova; Kazakhstan	88 kg	Y Thơ; Vietnam	84 kg
Clean & Jerk	Snezhana Kashkarova; Kazakhstan	112 kg	Marjona Abdumutalova; Uzbekistan	109 kg	Rosalinda Faustino; Philippines	105 kg
Total	Snezhana Kashkarova; Kazakhstan	200 kg	Marjona Abdumutalova; Uzbekistan	199 kg	Rosalinda Faustino; Philippines	188 kg
61 kg
Snatch	Ziyoda Khudoykulova; Uzbekistan	96 kg	Yaowaret Phoemkaew; Thailand	95 kg	Maryam Keshtkar; Iran	94 kg
Clean & Jerk	Yaowaret Phoemkaew; Thailand	120 kg	Ziyoda Khudoykulova; Uzbekistan	112 kg	Maryam Keshtkar; Iran	111 kg
Total	Yaowaret Phoemkaew; Thailand	215 kg	Ziyoda Khudoykulova; Uzbekistan	208 kg	Maryam Keshtkar; Iran	205 kg
69 kg
Snatch	Shakhnoza Khaydarova; Uzbekistan	99 kg	Kira Danilova; Kazakhstan	98 kg	Tamanna; India	93 kg
Clean & Jerk	Hasti Sedighi; Iran	126 kg	Shakhnoza Khaydarova; Uzbekistan	121 kg	Medine Amanowa; Turkmenistan	121 kg
Total	Shakhnoza Khaydarova; Uzbekistan	220 kg	Kira Danilova; Kazakhstan	213 kg	Hanieh Sharifi; Iran	211 kg
77 kg
Snatch	Ayanat Zhumagali; Kazakhstan	104 kg	Dilnura Kholdorova; Uzbekistan	101 kg	Dilnoza Fayzullaeva; Uzbekistan	100 kg
Clean & Jerk	Ayanat Zhumagali; Kazakhstan	133 kg	Anahita Zareei; Iran	126 kg	Dilnoza Fayzullaeva; Uzbekistan	123 kg
Total	Ayanat Zhumagali; Kazakhstan	237 kg	Dilnura Kholdorova; Uzbekistan	224 kg	Dilnoza Fayzullaeva; Uzbekistan	223 kg
86 kg
Snatch	Mahsa Beheshti; Iran	113 kg	Tống Thị Lý; Vietnam	107 kg	Aiganym Zhanbolat; Kazakhstan	105 kg
Clean & Jerk	Mahsa Beheshti; Iran	148 kg	Jeon Hee-soo; South Korea	131 kg	Tống Thị Lý; Vietnam	126 kg
Total	Mahsa Beheshti; Iran	261 kg	Jeon Hee-soo; South Korea	234 kg	Tống Thị Lý; Vietnam	233 kg
+86 kg
Snatch	Kim Che-ryang; South Korea	114 kg	Hosna Amiri; Iran	104 kg	Sofiya Sheshukova; Kazakhstan	100 kg
Clean & Jerk	Kim Che-ryang; South Korea	150 kg	Sofiya Sheshukova; Kazakhstan	132 kg	Roya Nourinejad; Iran	121 kg
Total	Kim Che-ryang; South Korea	264 kg	Sofiya Sheshukova; Kazakhstan	232 kg	Hosna Amiri; Iran	224 kg

=== Youth men's ===
Event	Gold		Silver		Bronze	
55 kg
Snatch	Hùng Văn Thế; Vietnam	110 kg	Mohammed Nawaf M. Al-Ojaian; Saudi Arabia	109 kg	Jay-R Colonia; Philippines	108 kg
Clean & Jerk	Mohammed Nawaf M. Al-Ojaian; Saudi Arabia	138 kg WYR	Jay-R Colonia; Philippines	135 kg	Hùng Văn Thế; Vietnam	131 kg
Total	Mohammed Nawaf M. Al-Ojaian; Saudi Arabia	247 kg WYR	Jay-R Colonia; Philippines	243 kg	Hùng Văn Thế; Vietnam	241 kg
60 kg
Snatch	Jerick Icon Castro; Philippines	116 kg	Atabek Azamatow; Turkmenistan	113 kg	Kirby Kent Alas-as; Philippines	110 kg
Clean & Jerk	Jerick Icon Castro; Philippines	144 kg AYR	Dharmajyoti Dewgharia; India	139 kg	Azizbek Dadajonov; Uzbekistan	134 kg
Total	Jerick Icon Castro; Philippines	260 kg	Atabek Azamatow; Turkmenistan	245 kg	Kirby Kent Alas-as; Philippines	243 kg
65 kg
Snatch	Beibarys Yerseit; Kazakhstan	129 kg	Sunil Singh; India	128 kg	Nguyễn Thanh Duy; Vietnam	125 kg
Clean & Jerk	Nguyễn Thanh Duy; Vietnam	153 kg	Beibarys Yerseit; Kazakhstan	152 kg	Zhanassyl Arapbay; Kazakhstan	140 kg
Total	Beibarys Yerseit; Kazakhstan	281 kg AYR	Nguyễn Thanh Duy; Vietnam	278 kg	Ayu Higa; Japan	256 kg
70 kg
Snatch	Reza Zamani; Iran	122 kg	Torekhan Assankhan; Kazakhstan	119 kg	Witchaya Prathumta; Thailand	119 kg
Clean & Jerk	Witchaya Prathumta; Thailand	154 kg	Torekhan Assankhan; Kazakhstan	150 kg	Reza Zamani; Iran	146 kg
Total	Witchaya Prathumta; Thailand	273 kg	Torekhan Assankhan; Kazakhstan	269 kg	Reza Zamani; Iran	268 kg
75 kg
Snatch	Mohammad Javad Beiranvand; Iran	145 kg WYR	Tokhir Turobov; Uzbekistan	141 kg	Ramazan Omar; Kazakhstan	137 kg
Clean & Jerk	Mohammad Javad Beiranvand; Iran	180 kg WYR	Abhinob Gogoi; India	166 kg	Ko Jun; South Korea	165 kg
Total	Mohammad Javad Beiranvand; Iran	325 kg WYR	Abhinob Gogoi; India	301 kg	Tokhir Turobov; Uzbekistan	300 kg
85 kg
Snatch	Otabek Karimov; Uzbekistan	148 kg	Mohammad Amin Dadvand; Iran	144 kg	Azizbek Kutbiddinov; Uzbekistan	141 kg
Clean & Jerk	Mohammad Amin Dadvand; Iran	179 kg	Azizbek Kutbiddinov; Uzbekistan	178 kg	Otabek Karimov; Uzbekistan	169 kg
Total	Mohammad Amin Dadvand; Iran	323 kg	Azizbek Kutbiddinov; Uzbekistan	319 kg	Otabek Karimov; Uzbekistan	317 kg
95 kg
Snatch	Nurzhan Zhumabay; Kazakhstan	159 kg AYR	Mousa Khudhair Qaiti; Iraq	156 kg	Kim Tae-yang; South Korea	155 kg
Clean & Jerk	Mukhammadshokir Turdaliev; Uzbekistan	196 kg AYR	Nurzhan Zhumabay; Kazakhstan	195 kg	Alisher Osmanov; Uzbekistan	184 kg
Total	Nurzhan Zhumabay; Kazakhstan	354 kg AYR	Mukhammadshokir Turdaliev; Uzbekistan	349 kg	Alisher Osmanov; Uzbekistan	335 kg
+95 kg
Snatch	Taha Nojavan; Iran	176 kg WYR	Pouria Abbaspourian; Iran	175 kg	Elbek Idiev; Uzbekistan	157 kg
Clean & Jerk	Taha Nojavan; Iran	215 kg WYR	Pouria Abbaspourian; Iran	206 kg	Elbek Idiev; Uzbekistan	198 kg
Total	Taha Nojavan; Iran	391 kg WYR	Pouria Abbaspourian; Iran	381 kg	Elbek Idiev; Uzbekistan	355 kg

=== Youth women's ===
Event	Gold		Silver		Bronze	
45 kg
Snatch	Parismita Gogoi; India	65 kg	Titli Maji; India	65 kg	Soliha Bahodirova; Uzbekistan	64 kg
Clean & Jerk	Althea Bacaro; Philippines	83 kg	Titli Maji; India	80 kg	Mấu Thị Bảy; Vietnam	79 kg
Total	Althea Bacaro; Philippines	146 kg	Titli Maji; India	145 kg	Mấu Thị Bảy; Vietnam	142 kg
49 kg
Snatch	Alexsandra Ann Diaz; Philippines	77 kg	Lin Chun-yu; Chinese Taipei	63 kg	Huang Pei-quan; Chinese Taipei	61 kg
Clean & Jerk	Alexsandra Ann Diaz; Philippines	92 kg	Huang Pei-quan; Chinese Taipei	80 kg	Lin Chun-yu; Chinese Taipei	77 kg
Total	Alexsandra Ann Diaz; Philippines	169 kg	Huang Pei-quan; Chinese Taipei	141 kg	Lin Chun-yu; Chinese Taipei	140 kg
53 kg
Snatch	Jhodie Peralta; Philippines	86 kg	Şabnam Kerimbaýewa; Turkmenistan	83 kg	Bhargavi Bellana; India	80 kg
Clean & Jerk	Şabnam Kerimbaýewa; Turkmenistan	103 kg	Jhodie Peralta; Philippines	102 kg	Bhargavi Bellana; India	98 kg
Total	Jhodie Peralta; Philippines	188 kg	Şabnam Kerimbaýewa; Turkmenistan	186 kg	Bhargavi Bellana; India	178 kg
57 kg
Snatch	Snezhana Kashkarova; Kazakhstan	88 kg AYR	Zarina Abdullakhakova; Uzbekistan	78 kg	Nursyila Berikbol; Kazakhstan	77 kg
Clean & Jerk	Snezhana Kashkarova; Kazakhstan	112 kg WYR	Jung Hye-dam; South Korea	107 kg	Nursyila Berikbol; Kazakhstan	99 kg
Total	Snezhana Kashkarova; Kazakhstan	200 kg WYR	Jung Hye-dam; South Korea	184 kg	Nursyila Berikbol; Kazakhstan	176 kg
61 kg
Snatch	Xeniya Prozorova; Kazakhstan	94 kg WYR	Hajar Moeini; Iran	90 kg	Munisa Baltaeva; Uzbekistan	89 kg
Clean & Jerk	Munisa Baltaeva; Uzbekistan	111 kg	Xeniya Prozorova; Kazakhstan	110 kg	Hajar Moeini; Iran	105 kg
Total	Munisa Baltaeva; Uzbekistan	204 kg	Xeniya Prozorova; Kazakhstan	200 kg	Hajar Moeini; Iran	195 kg
69 kg
Snatch	Shakhnoza Khaydarova; Uzbekistan	99 kg	Margarita Yermakova; Kazakhstan	94 kg	Nurkhayot Kobilova; Uzbekistan	93 kg
Clean & Jerk	Shakhnoza Khaydarova; Uzbekistan	121 kg	Nurkhayot Kobilova; Uzbekistan	119 kg	Margarita Yermakova; Kazakhstan	117 kg
Total	Shakhnoza Khaydarova; Uzbekistan	220 kg	Nurkhayot Kobilova; Uzbekistan	212 kg	Margarita Yermakova; Kazakhstan	211 kg
77 kg
Snatch	Nasim Ghasemi; Iran	97 kg	Park Min-hee; South Korea	96 kg	Anahita Zareei; Iran	92 kg
Clean & Jerk	Anahita Zareei; Iran	126 kg	Nasim Ghasemi; Iran	117 kg	Bùi Thị Như Bình; Vietnam	116 kg
Total	Anahita Zareei; Iran	218 kg	Nasim Ghasemi; Iran	214 kg	Park Min-hee; South Korea	208 kg
+77 kg
Snatch	Mahsa Beheshti; Iran	113 kg	Tống Thị Lý; Vietnam	107 kg	Hulkar Ruzikulova; Uzbekistan	102 kg
Clean & Jerk	Mahsa Beheshti; Iran	148 kg	Choi Ye-won; South Korea	133 kg	Sofiya Sheshukova; Kazakhstan	132 kg
Total	Mahsa Beheshti; Iran	261 kg	Tống Thị Lý; Vietnam	233 kg	Sofiya Sheshukova; Kazakhstan	232 kg

== Medal table ==
=== Junior ===
Ranking by Big (Total result) medals

* Host nation (Uzbekistan)

Rank	Nation	Gold	Silver	Bronze	Total
1	Iran	4	2	4	10
2	Kazakhstan	3	2	3	8
3	Thailand	3	0	0	3
4	Uzbekistan*	2	5	2	9
5	Philippines	1	2	3	6
6	India	1	2	1	4
6	South Korea	1	2	1	4
8	Vietnam	1	0	1	2
9	Bahrain	0	1	0	1
10	Turkmenistan	0	0	1	1
Totals (10 entries)		16	16	16	48

Ranking by all medals: Big (Total result) and Small (Snatch and Clean & Jerk)

* Host nation (Uzbekistan)

Rank	Nation	Gold	Silver	Bronze	Total
1	Iran	13	7	9	29
2	Uzbekistan*	7	10	6	23
3	Kazakhstan	7	9	9	25
4	Philippines	6	3	6	15
5	Thailand	6	2	1	9
6	South Korea	3	5	4	12
7	Vietnam	3	2	5	10
8	India	2	6	3	11
9	Syria	1	0	0	1
10	Turkmenistan	0	2	3	5
11	Bahrain	0	2	1	3
12	Kyrgyzstan	0	0	1	1
Totals (12 entries)		48	48	48	144

=== Youth ===
Ranking by Big (Total result) medals

* Host nation (Uzbekistan)

Youth Section Medal Tally – 2026 Asian Youth & Junior Weightlifting Championships
Rank	Nation	Gold	Silver	Bronze	Total
1	Iran	5	2	2	9
2	Philippines	4	1	1	6
3	Kazakhstan	3	2	3	8
4	Uzbekistan*	2	3	4	9
5	Saudi Arabia	1	0	0	1
5	Thailand	1	0	0	1
7	Vietnam	0	2	2	4
8	India	0	2	1	3
9	Turkmenistan	0	2	0	2
10	Chinese Taipei	0	1	1	2
10	South Korea	0	1	1	2
12	Japan	0	0	1	1
Totals (12 entries)		16	16	16	48

Ranking by all medals: Big (Total result) and Small (Snatch and Clean & Jerk)

* Host nation (Uzbekistan)

Rank	Nation	Gold	Silver	Bronze	Total
1	Iran	15	7	5	27
2	Philippines	10	3	3	16
3	Kazakhstan	9	7	9	25
4	Uzbekistan*	6	8	14	28
5	Vietnam	2	3	6	11
6	Saudi Arabia	2	1	0	3
7	Thailand	2	0	1	3
8	India	1	7	3	11
9	Turkmenistan	1	4	0	5
10	South Korea	0	4	3	7
11	Chinese Taipei	0	3	3	6
12	Iraq	0	1	0	1
13	Japan	0	0	1	1
Totals (13 entries)		48	48	48	144
