= Jyoshna Sabar =

Indian weightlifter (born 2008)

Personal information
- Born: 25 October 2008 (age 17) Pekata, Gajapati, Odisha, India
- Education: Kalinga Institute of Social Sciences

Sport
- Sport: Weightlifting
- Coached by: Ravi Kumar Katulu

Achievements and titles
- Personal bests: Snatch: 60 kg (2023); Clean & Jerk: 75 kg (2024); Total: 135 kg AYR (2024)
Medal record
Women's weightlifting
Representing India
Youth World Championships
Silver medal – second place	2024 Lima	40kg
Bronze medal – third place	2023 Durrës	40kg
Bronze medal – third place	2025 Lima	40kg
Asian Youth Championships
Gold medal – first place	2024 Doha	40kg
Bronze medal – third place	2023 New Delhi	40kg
Commonwealth Youth Championships
Gold medal – first place	2023 Greater Noida	40kg
Gold medal – first place	2024 Suva	40kg

Jyoshna Sabar (born 25 October 2008) is an Indian weightlifter. She broke the Asian Youth Record at the 2024 Asian Youth Championships, lifting a total of 135 kg in the 40 kg category.

== Early life ==
Sabar was born in a remote village, Pekata, in Gajapati district, Odisha to Kirtan Sabar and Gachameri Sabar. The teaching staff of her school recognized her sporting potential.

Sabar was selected to join the TENVIC Sports Weightlifting High Performance Centre in 2018, and simultaneously pursued her education at the Kalinga Institute of Social Sciences.

== Career ==
Sabar trains under Ravi Kumar Katulu at the TENVIC High Performance Centre in Bhubaneswar. Sabar has won several medals at the state and national levels. While winning gold in the 40 kg category at the 2023 Khelo India Youth Games, she set a new National Record of 60 kg in the snatch.

In May 2023, the Talent Identification and Development Committee of the Khelo India initiative selected Sabar as one of the weightlifters to be designated a Khelo India Athlete, thereby receiving support for training and in competitions.

Sabar won a bronze (overall) and a silver (snatch) at the 2023 Youth World Weightlifting Championships in the 40 kg event.

Sabar won two silvers (overall and snatch) at the 2024 Youth World Weightlifting Championships in the 40 kg event.

== Major results ==
Year	Venue	Weight	Snatch (kg)	Clean & Jerk (kg)	Total	Rank
Youth World Championships
2025	Lima, Peru	40 kg	56	72	128	3
2024	Lima, Peru	40 kg	56	69	125	2
2023	Durrës, Albania	40 kg	53	62	115	3
Asian Youth Championships
2024	Doha, Qatar	40 kg	60	75	135; AYR	1
2023	New Delhi, India	40 kg	55	64	119	3
Commonwealth Youth Championships
2024	Suva, Fiji	40 kg	58	65	123	1
2023	Greater Noida, India	40 kg	52	64	116	1
Khelo India Youth Games
2023	Chennai, India	40 kg	60	70	130	1
IWLF National Weightlifting Championships
2024	Nagrota Bagwan, India	40 kg	56	64	120	1
2023	Itanagar, India	40 kg	58	71	129	1
IWLF National Youth Championships
2022-23	Nagercoil, India	40 kg	53	71	124	1

== Awards and honours ==
Year	Award	Category	Result	Ref(s)
2025	Rashtriya Bal Puraskar	Highest civilian honour for children	Won	
