= Albert Delos Santos =

Filipino weightlifter

Personal information
- Born: Albert Ian Delos Santos; August 12, 2006 (age 20)
- Home town: Zamboanga City
- Education: Universidad de Zamboanga

Sport
- Country: Philippines
- Sport: Weightlifting
- Coached by: Alvin Delos Santos (until 2025); Diwa Delos Santos; Julius Naranjo
Achievements and titles
Men's weightlifting
Representing the Philippines
Asian Games
Bronze medal – third place	2026 Aichi–Nagoya	70 kg
Asian Junior Championships
Gold medal – first place	2026 Tashkent	70 kg
Silver medal – second place	2023 Delhi	61 kg
SEA Games
Silver medal – second place	2025 Thailand	71 kg

Albert Ian Delos Santos (born August 12, 2006) is a Filipino weightlifter.

== Early life and education ==
Albert Ian Delos Santos was born on August 12, 2006 His parents Alvin and Diwa Delos Santos were both former national weightlifters who represented the Philippines. His sister, Dessa has also grew up to be a national weightlifter. He attended the Universidad de Zamboanga for senior high school, and in college later took up business administration degree in the same institution.

== Career ==
Delos Santos competed at the 2018 Batang Pinoy in Baguio in the under-38 kg division He joined the Philippine national youth team in 2020 and represented the country at the 2021 Youth World Weightlifting Championships in Saudi Arabia.

At the 2023 Asian Youth & Junior Weightlifting Championships in India, he competed in the men's 61 kg category, winning gold in the clean and jerk with a lift of 149 kg and in the total with 259 kg.

Making his senior international debut at the 2025 World Weightlifting Championships in Norway in October, Delos Santos competed in the men's 71 kg category and placed eighth with a total of 322 kg. His 185 kg clean and jerk, however, set a world junior record. He dedicated the performance to his father, who had died two months earlier.

At the 2026 Asian Youth & Junior Weightlifting Championships in Uzbekistan, he swept the junior men's 70 kg category, winning gold in the snatch, clean and jerk, and total.

At the 2026 Asian Games in Aichi and Nagoya, Japan, Delos Santos earned a bronze medal by lifting 324kg total in the men's 70kg.

== Major results ==
Year	Venue	Weight	Snatch (kg)				Clean & Jerk (kg)				Total	Rank
Year	Venue	Weight	1	2	3	Rank	1	2	3	Rank	Total	Rank
World Championships
2025	Førde, Norway	71 kg	133	137	~~140~~	12	175	180	185	5	322	8
2026	Ningbo, China	70 kg	140	~~143~~	144	4	181	~~187~~	187 WJR	4	331 WJR	4
Asian Games
2026	Nagoya, Japan	70 kg	138	141	~~143~~	4	178	181	183 WJR	3	324 WJR	3rd place, bronze medalist(s)
Asian Youth & Junior Weightlifting Championships
2023	Delhi, India	61 kg	105	110	~~112~~	6	145	148	~~150~~	2nd place, silver medalist(s)	258	2nd place, silver medalist(s)
2026	Tashkent, Uzbekistan	70 kg	135	138	141	1st place, gold medalist(s)	176	180 WJR	—	1st place, gold medalist(s)	321 WJR	1st place, gold medalist(s)
