= List of Panamerican youth records in Olympic weightlifting =

The Panamerican youth records in Olympic weightlifting are maintained in each weight class for the snatch lift, clean & jerk lift, and the total for both lifts by the Pan American Weightlifting Federation (PAWF).

== Current records ==
Key to tables: Awaiting ratification Not ratified or later rescinded by PAWF

=== Men ===
Event	Record	Athlete	Nation	Date	Meet	Place	Age	Ref
55 kg
Snatch	98 kg	PAWF Standard						
Clean & Jerk	125 kg	PAWF Standard						
Total	220 kg	PAWF Standard						
60 kg
Snatch	109 kg	PAWF Standard						
Clean & Jerk	142 kg	Víctor Méndez	Mexico	6 July 2026	World Youth Championships	Cali, Colombia	17 years, 186 days	
Total	250 kg	Víctor Méndez	Mexico	6 July 2026	World Youth Championships	Cali, Colombia	17 years, 186 days	
65 kg
Snatch	123 kg	David Linares	Venezuela	7 July 2026	World Youth Championships	Cali, Colombia	15 years, 316 days	
Clean & Jerk	151 kg	David Linares	Venezuela	7 July 2026	World Youth Championships	Cali, Colombia	15 years, 316 days	
Total	274 kg	David Linares	Venezuela	7 July 2026	World Youth Championships	Cali, Colombia	15 years, 316 days	
70 kg
Snatch	122 kg	PAWF Standard						
Clean & Jerk	153 kg	PAWF Standard						
Total	277 kg	PAWF Standard						
75 kg
Snatch	128 kg	PAWF Standard						
Clean & Jerk	160 kg	PAWF Standard						
Total	289 kg	PAWF Standard						
85 kg
Snatch	138 kg	PAWF Standard						
Clean & Jerk	168 kg	PAWF Standard						
Total	305 kg	PAWF Standard						
95 kg
Snatch	144 kg	PAWF Standard						
Clean & Jerk	180 kg	Matías Moreno	Chile	29 August 2026	Pan American Youth Championships	Guayaquil, Ecuador	17 years, 129 days	
Total	320 kg	Matías Moreno	Chile	29 August 2026	Pan American Youth Championships	Guayaquil, Ecuador	17 years, 129 days	
+95 kg
Snatch	136 kg	PAWF Standard						
Clean & Jerk	167 kg	PAWF Standard						
Total	302 kg	PAWF Standard						

=== Women ===
Event	Record	Athlete	Nation	Date	Meet	Place	Age	Ref
45 kg
Snatch	72 kg	Aurora van Ulft	Aruba	26 August 2026	Pan American Youth Championships	Guayaquil, Ecuador	13 years, 202 days	
Clean & Jerk	94 kg	Aurora van Ulft	Aruba	26 August 2026	Pan American Youth Championships	Guayaquil, Ecuador	13 years, 202 days	
Total	166 kg	Aurora van Ulft	Aruba	26 August 2026	Pan American Youth Championships	Guayaquil, Ecuador	13 years, 202 days	
49 kg
Snatch	74 kg	PAWF Standard						
Snatch	81 kg	Enderlin Ulacio	Venezuela	4 October 2026	Pan American Junior Championships	Tepic, Mexico	17 years, 38 days	
Clean & Jerk	93 kg	PAWF Standard						
Clean & Jerk	100 kg	Enderlin Ulacio	Venezuela	4 October 2026	Pan American Junior Championships	Tepic, Mexico	17 years, 38 days	
Total	166 kg	PAWF Standard						
Total	181 kg	Enderlin Ulacio	Venezuela	4 October 2026	Pan American Junior Championships	Tepic, Mexico	17 years, 38 days	
53 kg
Snatch	84 kg	Arianye Echandía	Venezuela	6 July 2026	World Youth Championships	Cali, Colombia	16 years, 265 days	
Clean & Jerk	103 kg	Arianye Echandía	Venezuela	23 April 2026	South American Youth Games	Panama City, Panama	16 years, 191 days	
Total	187 kg	Arianye Echandía	Venezuela	6 July 2026	World Youth Championships	Cali, Colombia	16 years, 265 days	
57 kg
Snatch	83 kg	PAWF Standard						
Clean & Jerk	103 kg	PAWF Standard						
Total	184 kg	PAWF Standard						
61 kg
Snatch	87 kg	PAWF Standard						
Clean & Jerk	107 kg	PAWF Standard						
Total	192 kg	PAWF Standard						
69 kg
Snatch	95 kg	PAWF Standard						
Clean & Jerk	116 kg	PAWF Standard						
Total	210 kg	PAWF Standard						
77 kg
Snatch	101 kg	PAWF Standard						
Clean & Jerk	124 kg	PAWF Standard						
Total	223 kg	PAWF Standard						
+77 kg
Snatch	110 kg	Lidysmar Aparicio	Colombia	11 July 2026	World Youth Championships	Cali, Colombia	17 years, 11 days	
Clean & Jerk	140 kg	Lidysmar Aparicio	Colombia	11 July 2026	World Youth Championships	Cali, Colombia	17 years, 11 days	
Total	250 kg	Lidysmar Aparicio	Colombia	11 July 2026	World Youth Championships	Cali, Colombia	17 years, 11 days	

== Historical records ==
=== Men (2025–2026) ===
Event	Record	Athlete	Nation	Date	Meet	Place	Age	Ref
56 kg
Snatch	103 kg	PAWF Standard						
Clean & Jerk	130 kg	PAWF Standard						
Total	231 kg	PAWF Standard						
71 kg
Snatch	124 kg	PAWF Standard						
Clean & Jerk	157 kg	PAWF Standard						
Total	282 kg	PAWF Standard						
79 kg
Snatch	133 kg	PAWF Standard						
Clean & Jerk	166 kg	PAWF Standard						
Total	299 kg	PAWF Standard						
88 kg
Snatch	140 kg	PAWF Standard						
Snatch	151 kg	José Mantilla	Mexico	10 July 2026	World Youth Championships	Cali, Colombia	16 years, 359 days	
Clean & Jerk	175 kg	José Mantilla	Mexico	13 November 2025	Pan American Youth Championships	San Luis Potosí, Mexico	16 years, 120 days	
Clean & Jerk	184 kg	José Mantilla	Mexico	10 July 2026	World Youth Championships	Cali, Colombia	16 years, 359 days	
Total	315 kg	José Mantilla	Mexico	13 November 2025	Pan American Youth Championships	San Luis Potosí, Mexico	16 years, 120 days	
Total	335 kg	José Mantilla	Mexico	10 July 2026	World Youth Championships	Cali, Colombia	16 years, 359 days	
94 kg
Snatch	143 kg	PAWF Standard						
Clean & Jerk	173 kg	PAWF Standard						
Total	312 kg	PAWF Standard						
+94 kg
Snatch	139 kg	PAWF Standard						
Clean & Jerk	170 kg	PAWF Standard						
Total	307 kg	PAWF Standard						

=== Men (2018–2025) ===
Event	Record	Athlete	Nation	Date	Meet	Place	Age	Ref
49 kg
Snatch	89 kg	Freddy Bustillo	Colombia	20 June 2024	South American Youth Championships	Palmira, Colombia	17 years, 160 days	
Clean & Jerk	111 kg	Freddy Bustillo	Colombia	20 June 2024	South American Youth Championships	Palmira, Colombia	17 years, 160 days	
Total	200 kg	Freddy Bustillo	Colombia	20 June 2024	South American Youth Championships	Palmira, Colombia	17 years, 160 days	
55 kg
Snatch	100 kg	Samuel Andrade	Colombia	4 April 2024	Bolivarian Youth Games	Sucre, Bolivia	16 years, 323 days	
Clean & Jerk	130 kg	Adolfo Tun	Mexico	19 August 2021	Pan American Youth Championships	Monterrey, Mexico	16 years, 330 days	
Total	225 kg	Samuel Andrade	Colombia	4 April 2024	Bolivarian Youth Games	Sucre, Bolivia	16 years, 323 days	
61 kg
Snatch	120 kg	Hampton Morris	United States	6 October 2021	Youth World Championships	Jeddah, Saudi Arabia	17 years, 231 days	
Clean & Jerk	156 kg	Hampton Morris	United States	6 October 2021	Youth World Championships	Jeddah, Saudi Arabia	17 years, 231 days	
Total	276 kg	Hampton Morris	United States	6 October 2021	Youth World Championships	Jeddah, Saudi Arabia	17 years, 231 days	
67 kg
Snatch	128 kg	Reinner Arango	Venezuela	26 November 2021	Junior Pan American Games	Palmira, Colombia	17 years, 247 days	
Clean & Jerk	158 kg	Reinner Arango	Venezuela	26 November 2021	Junior Pan American Games	Palmira, Colombia	17 years, 247 days	
Total	286 kg	Reinner Arango	Venezuela	26 November 2021	Junior Pan American Games	Palmira, Colombia	17 years, 247 days	
73 kg
Snatch	132 kg	Brayan Ibanez	Canada	14 June 2022	Youth World Championships	León, Mexico	15 years, 269 days	
Clean & Jerk	160 kg	Johan Córdoba	Colombia	22 June 2024	South American Youth Championships	Palmira, Colombia	17 years, 151 days	
Total	288 kg	Brayan Ibanez	Canada	14 June 2022	Youth World Championships	León, Mexico	15 years, 269 days	
81 kg
Snatch	146 kg	Juan Guadamud	Ecuador	21 August 2021	Pan American Youth Championships	Monterrey, Mexico	17 years, 58 days	
Clean & Jerk	173 kg	Juan Guadamud	Ecuador	21 August 2021	Pan American Youth Championships	Monterrey, Mexico	17 years, 58 days	
Total	319 kg	Juan Guadamud	Ecuador	21 August 2021	Pan American Youth Championships	Monterrey, Mexico	17 years, 58 days	
89 kg
Snatch	138 kg	Jhon Murillo	Colombia	23 June 2024	South American Youth Championships	Palmira, Colombia	16 years, 123 days	
Clean & Jerk	167 kg	Jhon Murillo	Colombia	23 June 2024	South American Youth Championships	Palmira, Colombia	16 years, 123 days	
Total	305 kg	Jhon Murillo	Colombia	23 June 2024	South American Youth Championships	Palmira, Colombia	16 years, 123 days	
96 kg
Snatch	141 kg	Timothy Davis	United States	10 October 2021	Youth World Championships	Jeddah, Saudi Arabia	17 years, 235 days	
Clean & Jerk	180 kg	Morgan McCullough	United States	28 June 2019	Pan American Junior Championships	Havana, Cuba	15 years, 320 days	
Total	317 kg	Timothy Davis	United States	10 October 2021	Youth World Championships	Jeddah, Saudi Arabia	17 years, 235 days	
102 kg
Snatch	151 kg	Joaquín Mesa	Argentina	21 August 2023	Pan American Youth Championships	Greater Caracas, Venezuela	17 years, 31 days	
Clean & Jerk	176 kg	Joaquín Mesa	Argentina	8 July 2023	South American Youth Championships	Guayaquil, Ecuador	16 years, 352 days	
Total	327 kg	Joaquín Mesa	Argentina	21 August 2023	Pan American Youth Championships	Greater Caracas, Venezuela	17 years, 31 days	
+102 kg
Snatch	145 kg	Carlos Escudero	Ecuador	12 December 2018	International Junior CSLP Cup	Guayaquil, Ecuador	17 years, 26 days	
Clean & Jerk	176 kg	Daniel Díaz	Colombia	15 July 2021	Pan American Junior Championships	Manizales, Colombia	17 years, 155 days	
Total	317 kg	Daniel Díaz	Colombia	15 July 2021	Pan American Junior Championships	Manizales, Colombia	17 years, 155 days	

=== Women (2025–2026) ===
Event	Record	Athlete	Nation	Date	Meet	Place	Age	Ref
44 kg
Snatch	66 kg	PAWF Standard						
Snatch	69 kg	Aurora van Ulft	Aruba	5 July 2026	World Youth Championships	Cali, Colombia	13 years, 150 days	
Clean & Jerk	85 kg	PAWF Standard						
Clean & Jerk	93 kg	Aurora van Ulft	Aruba	5 July 2026	World Youth Championships	Cali, Colombia	13 years, 150 days	
Total	150 kg	PAWF Standard						
Total	162 kg	Aurora van Ulft	Aruba	5 July 2026	World Youth Championships	Cali, Colombia	13 years, 150 days	
48 kg
Snatch	77 kg	Enderlin Ulacio	Venezuela	13 July 2025	Pan American Championships	Cali, Colombia	15 years, 320 days	
Clean & Jerk	96 kg	Enderlin Ulacio	Venezuela	13 July 2025	Pan American Championships	Cali, Colombia	15 years, 320 days	
Total	173 kg	Enderlin Ulacio	Venezuela	13 July 2025	Pan American Championships	Cali, Colombia	15 years, 320 days	
58 kg
Snatch	84 kg	PAWF Standard						
Clean & Jerk	104 kg	PAWF Standard						
Clean & Jerk	105 kg	Emily Kuster	Brazil	7 July 2026	World Youth Championships	Cali, Colombia	17 years, 140 days	
Total	187 kg	PAWF Standard						
63 kg
Snatch	89 kg	PAWF Standard						
Clean & Jerk	110 kg	PAWF Standard						
Total	198 kg	PAWF Standard						

=== Women (2018–2025) ===
Event	Record	Athlete	Nation	Date	Meet	Place	Age	Ref
40 kg
Snatch	56 kg	Isanelly da Silva	Brazil	28 August 2024	Pan American Youth Championships	Guayaquil, Ecuador	13 years, 308 days	
Snatch	56 kg	Lawren Estrada	Colombia	6 May 2022	South American Youth Games	Rosario, Argentina	15 years, 120 days	
Snatch	57 kg	Isanelly Da Silva	Brazil	30 April 2025	Youth World Championships	Lima, Peru	14 years, 187 days	
Clean & Jerk	73 kg	Lawren Estrada	Colombia	11 June 2022	Youth World Championships	León, Mexico	15 years, 156 days	
Clean & Jerk	77 kg	Isanelly Da Silva	Brazil	30 April 2025	Youth World Championships	Lima, Peru	14 years, 187 days	
Total	129 kg	Isanelly da Silva	Brazil	28 August 2024	Pan American Youth Championships	Guayaquil, Ecuador	13 years, 308 days	
Total	129 kg	Lawren Estrada	Colombia	6 May 2022	South American Youth Games	Rosario, Argentina	15 years, 120 days	
Total	134 kg	Isanelly Da Silva	Brazil	30 April 2025	Youth World Championships	Lima, Peru	14 years, 187 days	
45 kg
Snatch	71 kg	Kerlys Montilla	Venezuela	12 June 2022	Youth World Championships	León, Mexico	17 years, 56 days	
Clean & Jerk	90 kg	Katherin Echandía	Venezuela	2 November 2018	World Championships	Ashgabat, Turkmenistan	17 years, 80 days	
Total	157 kg	Katherin Echandía	Venezuela	2 November 2018	World Championships	Ashgabat, Turkmenistan	17 years, 80 days	
49 kg
Snatch	75 kg	Yineth Santoya	Colombia	9 December 2018	International Junior CSLP Cup	Guayaquil, Ecuador	17 years, 125 days	
Clean & Jerk	93 kg	Kerlys Montilla	Venezuela	5 December 2022	World Championships	Bogotá, Colombia	17 years, 232 days	
Clean & Jerk	96 kg	Kelly López	Mexico	1 May 2025	Youth World Championships	Lima, Peru	17 years, 25 days	
Total	166 kg	Kerlys Montilla	Venezuela	5 December 2022	World Championships	Bogotá, Colombia	17 years, 232 days	
Total	169 kg	Kelly López	Mexico	1 May 2025	Youth World Championships	Lima, Peru	17 years, 25 days	
55 kg
Snatch	89 kg	Katharine Estep	United States	7 October 2021	Youth World Championships	Jeddah, Saudi Arabia	17 years, 50 days	
Clean & Jerk	109 kg	Katharine Estep	United States	7 October 2021	Youth World Championships	Jeddah, Saudi Arabia	17 years, 50 days	
Total	198 kg	Katharine Estep	United States	7 October 2021	Youth World Championships	Jeddah, Saudi Arabia	17 years, 50 days	
59 kg
Snatch	92 kg	Jéssica Palacios	Ecuador	6 July 2023	South American Youth Championships	Guayaquil, Ecuador	17 years, 184 days	
Clean & Jerk	115 kg	Jéssica Palacios	Ecuador	17 November 2023	World Junior Championships	Guadalajara, Mexico	17 years, 318 days	
Total	207 kg	Jéssica Palacios	Ecuador	17 November 2023	World Junior Championships	Guadalajara, Mexico	17 years, 318 days	
64 kg
Snatch	97 kg	Ingrid Segura	Colombia	19 August 2023	Pan American Youth Championships	Greater Caracas, Venezuela	17 years, 51 days	
Clean & Jerk	118 kg	Ingrid Segura	Colombia	19 August 2023	Pan American Youth Championships	Greater Caracas, Venezuela	17 years, 51 days	
Total	215 kg	Ingrid Segura	Colombia	19 August 2023	Pan American Youth Championships	Greater Caracas, Venezuela	17 years, 51 days	
71 kg
Snatch	98 kg	Ingrid Segura	Colombia	28 November 2023	CAC School Games	Caracas, Venezuela	17 years, 152 days	
Clean & Jerk	121 kg	Emmy Velázquez	Mexico	12 March 2019	Youth World Championships	Las Vegas, United States	16 years, 162 days	
Total	219 kg	Ingrid Segura	Colombia	28 November 2023	CAC School Games	Caracas, Venezuela	17 years, 152 days	
76 kg
Snatch	105 kg	Ella Nicholson	United States	20 November 2023	World Junior Championships	Guadalajara, Mexico	17 years, 136 days	
Clean & Jerk	122 kg	Ella Nicholson	United States	20 November 2023	World Junior Championships	Guadalajara, Mexico	17 years, 136 days	
Total	227 kg	Ella Nicholson	United States	20 November 2023	World Junior Championships	Guadalajara, Mexico	17 years, 136 days	
81 kg
Snatch	97 kg	Mayrín Hernández	Mexico	22 October 2022	Pan American Junior Championships	Lima, Peru	17 years, 84 days	
Snatch	103 kg	Lidysmar Aparicio	Venezuela	4 May 2025	Youth World Championships	Lima, Peru	15 years, 308 days	
Clean & Jerk	116 kg	Mayrín Hernández	Mexico	17 June 2022	Youth World Championships	León, Mexico	16 years, 322 days	
Clean & Jerk	127 kg	Lidysmar Aparicio	Venezuela	4 May 2025	Youth World Championships	Lima, Peru	15 years, 308 days	
Total	212 kg	Mayrín Hernández	Mexico	22 October 2022	Pan American Junior Championships	Lima, Peru	17 years, 84 days	
Total	230 kg	Lidysmar Aparicio	Venezuela	4 May 2025	Youth World Championships	Lima, Peru	15 years, 308 days	
+81 kg
Snatch	108 kg	Etta Love	Canada	27 September 2024	World Junior Championships	León, Spain	17 years, 30 days	
Clean & Jerk	146 kg	Etta Love	Canada	27 September 2024	World Junior Championships	León, Spain	17 years, 30 days	
Total	254 kg	Etta Love	Canada	27 September 2024	World Junior Championships	León, Spain	17 years, 30 days	
