= Fatmagül Çevik =

Turkish weightlifter (born 2005)

Personal information
- Born: 5 October 2005 (age 20) Isparta, Turkey
- Weight: 87 kg (192 lb)

Sport
- Country: Turkey
- Weight class: ^+87 kg
Medal record
Women's weightlifting
Representing Turkey
European Championships
Bronze medal – third place	2024 Sofia	+87 kg
World Junior Championships
Gold medal – first place	2025 Lima	+ 87 kg
European Junior Championships
Gold medal – first place	2025 Durres	+ 86 kg
Silver medal – second place	2023 Bucharest	+ 87 kg
Bronze medal – third place	2024 Raszyn	+ 87 kg
World Youth Championships
Silver medal – second place	2022 León	+81 kg
Bronze medal – third place	2021 Jeddah	+81 kg
European Youth Championships
Gold medal – first place	2021 Ciechanow	+81 kg
Gold medal – first place	2022 Raszyn	+81 kg

Fatmagül Çevik (5 October 2005) is a Turkish weightlifter competing in the +87 kg division.

== Sport career ==
Fatmagül Çevik started weightlifting as a hobby in 2013. She is a member of Isparta Belediye S.K. in her hometown.

She won the bronze medal in the +81 kg division at the 2021 Youth World Championships in Jeddah, Saudi Arabia after taking the silver meadl in ın the Snatch and, the bronze medal in the Clean & Jerk event. In the +81 kg division of the 2022 Youth World Championships in León, Mexico, she won three silver medals. Çevik captured the gold medal in the +81 kg division of the 2022 European Youth & U15 Championships in Raszyn, Poland following winning the silver medal in the Snatch and the gold medal in the Clean & Jerk event. Competing for the first time in the Senior category, she won one bronze medal in the Clean & Jerk event and one bronze medal in total in the +87 kg division of the 2024 European Championships in Sofia, Bulgaria.

On 11 July 2024, she set a new national record with 108 kg in the sntach event of the +87 kg category at the Junior Team Championships in Isparta, Turkey.

== Achievements ==
Year	Competition	Venue	Weight	Snatch		Clean & Jerk		Total	
Year	Competition	Venue	Weight	(kg)	Rank	(kg)	Rank	(kg)	Rank
2021	Junior World Championships	Tashkent, Uzbekistan	87 kg	84	7	108	6	192	7
2021	Youth World Championships	Jeddah, Saudi Arabia	+81 kg	95	2nd place, silver medalist(s)	108	3rd place, bronze medalist(s)	203	3rd place, bronze medalist(s)
2022	Youth World Championships	León, Mexico	+81 kg	99	2nd place, silver medalist(s)	120	2nd place, silver medalist(s)	219	2nd place, silver medalist(s)
2022	European Youth & U15 Championships	Raszyn, Poland	+81 kg	96	2nd place, silver medalist(s)	122	1st place, gold medalist(s)	218	1st place, gold medalist(s)
2024	European Championships	Sofia, Bulgaria	+87 kg	107	4	131	3rd place, bronze medalist(s)	238	3rd place, bronze medalist(s)

== Personal life ==
Fatmagül Çevik was born in Isparta, Turkey on 5 October 2005. She is a student at the vocational school Tümay Yavuz Ali Ergun Anatolian High School in her hometown.
