= Luluk Diana Tri Wijayana =

Indonesian weightlifter (born 2005)

Personal information
- Born: 9 August 2005 (age 21) Pacitan, East Java, Indonesia

Sport
- Country: Indonesia
- Sport: Weightlifting
- Weight class: 49 kg
Medal record
Women's weightlifting
Representing Indonesia
Asian Games
Bronze medal – third place	2026 Aichi–Nagoya	49 kg
SEA Games
Gold medal – first place	2025 Thailand	-48 kg
Bronze medal – third place	2023 Cambodia	–49 kg
Youth World Championships
Gold medal – first place	2022 León	–49 kg

Luluk Diana Tri Wijayana (born 9 August 2005) is an Indonesian weightlifter, competing in the women's 49 kg category.

== Early life ==
Luluk Diana Tri Wijayana was born in Pacitan, East Java, Indonesia on 9 August 2005. Since the age of 12, she has been accompanied by Samsuri, her coach.

== Career ==
In June 2022, Wijayana made her breakthrough when she competed in the Youth World Weightlifting Championships held in León, Guanajuato, Mexico, where she won a gold medal with a 147 kg total.

At the 2023 SEA Games held in Cambodia, Wijayana competed in the –49 kg event and won a bronze medal, her first medal at the games, in which she lifted with a 147 kg total. She returned to the next edition of the SEA Games held in Thailand, where she won the gold medal in the -48 kg event with a total of 184 kg.

In the 2026 Asian Games held at Aichi, Wijayana won her first ever Asian Games medal with a bronze in the women's 49 kg category. She placed third behind Ri Song-gum of North Korea and Mirabai Chanu of India with a total lift of 191 kg (421 lb) with 88 kg (194 lb) in snatch and 103 kg (227 lb) in clean & jerk.
