= Büşra Çan =

Turkish weightlifter (born 2006)

Personal information
- Born: 4 May 2006 (age 20) Gaziantep, Turkey
- Weight: 87 kg (192 lb)

Sport
- Country: Turkey
- Weight class: 87 kg
Medal record
Women's weightlifting
Representing Turkey
World Junior Championships
Silver medal – second place	2024 León	87 kg
Youth World Championships
Gold medal – first place	2022 León	81 kg
European Championships
Bronze medal – third place	2024 Sofia	87 kg CJ
European Junior and U23 Championships
Silver medal – second place	2023 Bucharest	87 kg
Silver medal – second place	2025 Durres	86 kg

Büşra Çan Kop (4 May 2006) is a Turkish weightlifter competing in the 87 kg division.

== Sport career ==
In her hometown, she was a member of the 8 Şubat GSK of her high school. She became silver medalist in the 81 kg division at the 2022 Turkish Seniors Championship held in Çorum.

After taking the silver medal in the Snatch and the gold medal in the Clean & Jerk events, Çan captured the gold medal in the 81 kg event at the 2022 Youth World Championships in León, Guanajuato, Mexico. She competed in the 94 kg division at the 2023 Youth World Championship in Durrës, Albania without achieving any success. She received three silver medals in the 87 kg division at the 2023 European Junior & U23 Championships in Bucharest, Romania. She won the bronze medal with 127 kg in the 87 kg Clean & Jerk division at the 2024 European Championships in Sofia, Bulgaria. With 227 kg in total, she ranked fifth.

== Achievements ==
Year	Competition	Venue	Weight	Snatch		Clean & Jerk		Total	
Year	Competition	Venue	Weight	(kg)	Rank	(kg)	Rank	(kg)	Rank
2022	Youth World Championships	León, Mexico	81 kg	94	2nd place, silver medalist(s)	118	1st place, gold medalist(s)	212	1st place, gold medalist(s)
2023	Youth World Championships	Durrës, Albania	94 kg	97	5	—	—	—	—
2023	European Junior & U23 Championships	Bucharest, Romania	87 kg	101	2nd place, silver medalist(s)	125	2nd place, silver medalist(s)	226	2nd place, silver medalist(s)
2024	European Championships	Sofia, Bulgaria	87 kg	100	8	127	3rd place, bronze medalist(s)	227	5

== Personal life ==
Büşra Çan was born in Gaziantep, Turkey on 4 May 2006. She studies at 8 Şubat Anatolian High School in her hometown.
