= 2022 Youth World Weightlifting Championships =

International weightlifting competition

- Venue: Domo de la Feria
- Location: León, Mexico
- Dates: 11–18 June
- Competitors: 195 from 37 nations

The 2022 Youth World Weightlifting Championships were a weightlifting competition held from 11 to 18 June in León, Mexico.

== Medals tables ==
Ranking by Big (Total result) medals

* Host nation (Mexico)

| Rank | Nation | Gold | Silver | Bronze | Total |
|---|---|---|---|---|---|
| 1 | Kazakhstan | 4 | 1 | 2 | 7 |
| 2 | Colombia | 4 | 1 | 1 | 6 |
| 3 | Turkey | 2 | 3 | 3 | 8 |
| 4 | Egypt | 2 | 2 | 1 | 5 |
| 5 | India | 1 | 2 | 1 | 4 |
| 6 | Georgia | 1 | 1 | 0 | 2 |
| 7 | Ecuador | 1 | 0 | 1 | 2 |
| 8 | Indonesia | 1 | 0 | 0 | 1 |
| 8 | Malta | 1 | 0 | 0 | 1 |
| 8 | Philippines | 1 | 0 | 0 | 1 |
| 8 | Slovakia | 1 | 0 | 0 | 1 |
| 8 | United States | 1 | 0 | 0 | 1 |
| 13 | Uzbekistan | 0 | 3 | 0 | 3 |
| 14 | Mexico* | 0 | 1 | 5 | 6 |
| 15 | Poland | 0 | 1 | 2 | 3 |
| 15 | Venezuela | 0 | 1 | 2 | 3 |
| 17 | Finland | 0 | 1 | 0 | 1 |
| 17 | Italy | 0 | 1 | 0 | 1 |
| 17 | Saudi Arabia | 0 | 1 | 0 | 1 |
| 17 | Turkmenistan | 0 | 1 | 0 | 1 |
| 21 | Bulgaria | 0 | 0 | 1 | 1 |
| 21 | Canada | 0 | 0 | 1 | 1 |
| Totals (22 entries) | | 20 | 20 | 20 | 60 |

Ranking by all medals: Big (Total result) and Small (Snatch and Clean & Jerk)

* Host nation (Mexico)

| Rank | Nation | Gold | Silver | Bronze | Total |
|---|---|---|---|---|---|
| 1 | Kazakhstan | 12 | 3 | 6 | 21 |
| 2 | Colombia | 10 | 5 | 4 | 19 |
| 3 | Egypt | 6 | 5 | 3 | 14 |
| 4 | Turkey | 5 | 11 | 7 | 23 |
| 5 | Ecuador | 4 | 0 | 2 | 6 |
| 6 | India | 3 | 5 | 3 | 11 |
| 7 | Georgia | 3 | 3 | 0 | 6 |
| 8 | United States | 3 | 1 | 1 | 5 |
| 9 | Indonesia | 3 | 0 | 0 | 3 |
| 9 | Malta | 3 | 0 | 0 | 3 |
| 9 | Slovakia | 3 | 0 | 0 | 3 |
| 12 | Philippines | 2 | 1 | 0 | 3 |
| 13 | Mexico* | 1 | 3 | 14 | 18 |
| 14 | Saudi Arabia | 1 | 2 | 0 | 3 |
| 15 | Venezuela | 1 | 1 | 6 | 8 |
| 16 | Uzbekistan | 0 | 8 | 2 | 10 |
| 17 | Poland | 0 | 3 | 3 | 6 |
| 18 | Turkmenistan | 0 | 3 | 2 | 5 |
| 19 | Italy | 0 | 3 | 0 | 3 |
| 20 | Finland | 0 | 2 | 1 | 3 |
| 21 | Bulgaria | 0 | 1 | 2 | 3 |
| 22 | Canada | 0 | 0 | 2 | 2 |
| 23 | Austria | 0 | 0 | 1 | 1 |
| 23 | Dominican Republic | 0 | 0 | 1 | 1 |
| Totals (24 entries) | | 60 | 60 | 60 | 180 |

== Medal overview ==
=== Men ===
| Event | | Gold | | Silver | | Bronze | |
| – 49 kg | Snatch | Alexis Endara (ECU) | 81 kg | Nino Simeonov (BUL) | 78 kg | Vijay Prajapati (IND) | 78 kg |
| – 49 kg | Clean & Jerk | Alexis Endara (ECU) | 103 kg | Vijay Prajapati (IND) | 97 kg | Nino Simeonov (BUL) | 96 kg |
| – 49 kg | Total | Alexis Endara (ECU) | 184 kg | Vijay Prajapati (IND) | 175 kg | Nino Simeonov (BUL) | 174 kg |
| – 55 kg | Snatch | Ali Majed Kalitit (KSA) | 105 kg | Sanapathi Gurunaidu (IND) | 104 kg | Yerassyl Umarov (KAZ) | 100 kg |
| – 55 kg | Clean & Jerk | Sanapathi Gurunaidu (IND) | 126 kg | Perhat Bagtyýarow (TKM) | 125 kg | Yerassyl Umarov (KAZ) | 124 kg |
| – 55 kg | Total | Sanapathi Gurunaidu (IND) | 230 kg | Ali Majed Kalitit (KSA) | 229 kg | Yerassyl Umarov (KAZ) | 224 kg |
| – 61 kg | Snatch | Engin Kara (TUR) | 114 kg | Mohammed Al-Marzouq (KSA) | 113 kg | Luis Blandón (COL) | 112 kg |
| – 61 kg | Clean & Jerk | Mustafa Eliş (TUR) | 138 kg | Engin Kara (TUR) | 136 kg | Luis Blandón (COL) | 136 kg |
| – 61 kg | Total | Engin Kara (TUR) | 250 kg | Mustafa Eliş (TUR) | 249 kg | Luis Blandón (COL) | 248 kg |
| – 67 kg | Snatch | Yerassyl Saulebekov (KAZ) | 123 kg | Halil İbrahim Akbulut (TUR) | 122 kg | Alaaddin Sayın (TUR) | 121 kg |
| – 67 kg | Clean & Jerk | Yerassyl Saulebekov (KAZ) | 158 kg | Alaaddin Sayın (TUR) | 157 kg | Bartosz Burski (POL) | 153 kg |
| – 67 kg | Total | Yerassyl Saulebekov (KAZ) | 281 kg | Alaaddin Sayın (TUR) | 278 kg | Bartosz Burski (POL) | 269 kg |
| – 73 kg | Snatch | Yedige Yemberdi (KAZ) | 134 kg | Diyorbek Ermatov (UZB) | 133 kg | Brayan Ibanez (CAN) | 132 kg |
| – 73 kg | Clean & Jerk | Yedige Yemberdi (KAZ) | 172 kg YWR | Yaşar Karaca (TUR) | 158 kg | Diyorbek Ermatov (UZB) | 157 kg |
| – 73 kg | Total | Yedige Yemberdi (KAZ) | 306 kg | Diyorbek Ermatov (UZB) | 290 kg | Brayan Ibanez (CAN) | 288 kg |
| – 81 kg | Snatch | Denis Poluboyarinov (KAZ) | 143 kg | Iacopo Falsinotti (ITA) | 132 kg | Ihann Barreras (MEX) | 119 kg |
| – 81 kg | Clean & Jerk | Denis Poluboyarinov (KAZ) | 180 kg | Iacopo Falsinotti (ITA) | 161 kg | Ihann Barreras (MEX) | 161 kg |
| – 81 kg | Total | Denis Poluboyarinov (KAZ) | 323 kg | Iacopo Falsinotti (ITA) | 293 kg | Ihann Barreras (MEX) | 280 kg |
| – 89 kg | Snatch | Mahmoud Hosny (EGY) | 150 kg | Nikoloz Esartia (GEO) | 141 kg | Carlos León (VEN) | 125 kg |
| – 89 kg | Clean & Jerk | Mahmoud Hosny (EGY) | 193 kg YWR | Nikoloz Esartia (GEO) | 174 kg | Carlos León (VEN) | 155 kg |
| – 89 kg | Total | Mahmoud Hosny (EGY) | 343 kg | Nikoloz Esartia (GEO) | 315 kg | Carlos León (VEN) | 280 kg |
| – 96 kg | Snatch | Gervasi Tabagari (GEO) | 140 kg | Saparly Muhyýew (TKM) | 133 kg | Abrorbek Marufbekov (UZB) | 133 kg |
| – 96 kg | Clean & Jerk | Gervasi Tabagari (GEO) | 177 kg | Pablo Medina (MEX) | 169 kg | Saparly Muhyýew (TKM) | 167 kg |
| – 96 kg | Total | Gervasi Tabagari (GEO) | 317 kg | Saparly Muhyýew (TKM) | 300 kg | Pablo Medina (MEX) | 300 kg |
| – 102 kg | Snatch | Nikita Abdrakhmanov (KAZ) | 157 kg | Kudratbek Salimjonov (UZB) | 156 kg | Cristian Bojórquez (MEX) | 133 kg |
| – 102 kg | Clean & Jerk | Nikita Abdrakhmanov (KAZ) | 191 kg | Kudratbek Salimjonov (UZB) | 171 kg | Sami Baki Kıymet (TUR) | 163 kg |
| – 102 kg | Total | Nikita Abdrakhmanov (KAZ) | 348 kg | Kudratbek Salimjonov (UZB) | 327 kg | Sami Baki Kıymet (TUR) | 295 kg |
| + 102 kg | Snatch | Vladimír Macura (SVK) | 151 kg | Jhon Martínez (COL) | 140 kg | José Meza (MEX) | 136 kg |
| + 102 kg | Clean & Jerk | Vladimír Macura (SVK) | 181 kg | Jhon Martínez (COL) | 175 kg | Kevin Asto (ECU) | 169 kg |
| + 102 kg | Total | Vladimír Macura (SVK) | 332 kg | Jhon Martínez (COL) | 315 kg | Marek Gugała (POL) | 303 kg |

=== Women ===
| Event | | Gold | | Silver | | Bronze | |
| – 40 kg | Snatch | Akanksha Vyavahare (IND) | 59 kg | Lawren Estrada (COL) | 55 kg | Aleksandra Belenko (KAZ) | 55 kg |
| – 40 kg | Clean & Jerk | Lawren Estrada (COL) | 73 kg | Aleksandra Belenko (KAZ) | 70 kg | Akanksha Vyavahare (IND) | 68 kg |
| – 40 kg | Total | Lawren Estrada (COL) | 128 kg | Akanksha Vyavahare (IND) | 127 kg | Aleksandra Belenko (KAZ) | 125 kg |
| – 45 kg | Snatch | Kerlys Montilla (VEN) | 71 kg | Rose Jean Ramos (PHI) | 70 kg | Rosailiz Santana (DOM) | 68 kg |
| – 45 kg | Clean & Jerk | Rose Jean Ramos (PHI) | 85 kg | Soumya Sunil Dalvi (IND) | 83 kg | Kerlys Montilla (VEN) | 82 kg |
| – 45 kg | Total | Rose Jean Ramos (PHI) | 155 kg | Kerlys Montilla (VEN) | 153 kg | Soumya Sunil Dalvi (IND) | 148 kg |
| – 49 kg | Snatch | Luluk Diana Tri Wijayana (INA) | 75 kg | Oliwia Drzazga (POL) | 70 kg | Darya Balabayuk (KAZ) | 69 kg |
| – 49 kg | Clean & Jerk | Luluk Diana Tri Wijayana (INA) | 95 kg | Oliwia Drzazga (POL) | 91 kg | Bahar Kırat (TUR) | 86 kg |
| – 49 kg | Total | Luluk Diana Tri Wijayana (INA) | 170 kg | Oliwia Drzazga (POL) | 161 kg | Joseline López (MEX) | 153 kg |
| – 55 kg | Snatch | Tenishia Thornton (MLT) | 78 kg | Noura Essam (EGY) | 76 kg | María Hernández (MEX) | 75 kg |
| – 55 kg | Clean & Jerk | Tenishia Thornton (MLT) | 100 kg | Noura Essam (EGY) | 95 kg | María Hernández (MEX) | 93 kg |
| – 55 kg | Total | Tenishia Thornton (MLT) | 178 kg | Noura Essam (EGY) | 171 kg | María Hernández (MEX) | 168 kg |
| – 59 kg | Snatch | Jéssica Palacios (ECU) | 84 kg | Dubaney Sinisterra (COL) | 83 kg | Medine Amanowa (TKM) | 83 kg |
| – 59 kg | Clean & Jerk | Dubaney Sinisterra (COL) | 104 kg | Hanin Ahmed (EGY) | 103 kg | Bárbara Carvajal (MEX) | 100 kg |
| – 59 kg | Total | Dubaney Sinisterra (COL) | 187 kg | Hanin Ahmed (EGY) | 185 kg | Jéssica Palacios (ECU) | 183 kg |
| – 64 kg | Snatch | Ingrid Segura (COL) | 94 kg | Nadezhda Li (KAZ) | 85 kg | Keily Silva (VEN) | 84 kg |
| – 64 kg | Clean & Jerk | Ingrid Segura (COL) | 117 kg | Anna Sierra (USA) | 106 kg | Brianna Marquez (USA) | 105 kg |
| – 64 kg | Total | Ingrid Segura (COL) | 211 kg | Nadezhda Li (KAZ) | 190 kg | Keily Silva (VEN) | 189 kg |
| – 71 kg | Snatch | Mia Rhodes (USA) | 92 kg | Burcu Gerçekden (TUR) | 91 kg | Janette Ylisoini (FIN) | 89 kg |
| – 71 kg | Clean & Jerk | Mia Rhodes (USA) | 110 kg | Janette Ylisoini (FIN) | 106 kg | Ivanna Cerquera (COL) | 104 kg |
| – 71 kg | Total | Mia Rhodes (USA) | 202 kg | Janette Ylisoini (FIN) | 195 kg | Burcu Gerçekden (TUR) | 194 kg |
| – 76 kg | Snatch | Rahma Ahmed (EGY) | 95 kg | Nigora Suvonova (UZB) | 91 kg | Estefany Espinoza (MEX) | 90 kg |
| – 76 kg | Clean & Jerk | Rahma Ahmed (EGY) | 120 kg | Nigora Suvonova (UZB) | 119 kg | Estefany Espinoza (MEX) | 110 kg |
| – 76 kg | Total | Rahma Ahmed (EGY) | 215 kg | Nigora Suvonova (UZB) | 210 kg | Estefany Espinoza (MEX) | 200 kg |
| – 81 kg | Snatch | Mayrin Hernández (MEX) | 95 kg | Büşra Çan (TUR) | 94 kg | Shams Mohamed (EGY) | 92 kg |
| – 81 kg | Clean & Jerk | Büşra Çan (TUR) | 118 kg | Mayrin Hernández (MEX) | 116 kg | Shams Mohamed (EGY) | 115 kg |
| – 81 kg | Total | Büşra Çan (TUR) | 212 kg | Mayrin Hernández (MEX) | 211 kg | Shams Mohamed (EGY) | 207 kg |
| + 81 kg | Snatch | Yairan Tysforod (COL) | 100 kg | Fatmagül Çevik (TUR) | 99 kg | Johanna Pfeilstöcker (AUT) | 96 kg |
| + 81 kg | Clean & Jerk | Yairan Tysforod (COL) | 121 kg | Fatmagül Çevik (TUR) | 120 kg | Tuana Süren (TUR) | 116 kg |
| + 81 kg | Total | Yairan Tysforod (COL) | 221 kg | Fatmagül Çevik (TUR) | 219 kg | Tuana Süren (TUR) | 211 kg |

== Team ranking ==
=== Men ===
| Rank | Team | Points |
|---|---|---|
| 1 | Mexico | 560 |
| 2 | Turkey | 434 |
| 3 | Ecuador | 434 |
| 4 | Kazakhstan | 405 |
| 5 | United States | 344 |
| 6 | Poland | 339 |

=== Women ===
| Rank | Team | Points |
|---|---|---|
| 1 | Turkey | 647 |
| 2 | Egypt | 638 |
| 3 | Mexico | 624 |
| 4 | United States | 576 |
| 5 | Ecuador | 448 |
| 6 | India | 420 |

== Participating countries ==
1. Australia (6)
2. Austria (1)
3. Brazil (1)
4. Bulgaria (5)
5. Canada (5)
6. Chile (2)
7. Colombia (8)
8. Croatia (2)
9. Czech Republic (1)
10. Dominican Republic (2)
11. Ecuador (15)
12. Egypt (12)
13. Estonia (1)
14. Finland (1)
15. Georgia (5)
16. Iceland (2)
17. India (12)
18. Indonesia (1)
19. Italy (5)
20. Kazakhstan (9)
21. Malta (1)
22. Mexico (20)
23. New Zealand (1)
24. Norway (2)
25. Peru (5)
26. Philippines (1)
27. Poland (9)
28. Puerto Rico (3)
29. Saudi Arabia (3)
30. Slovakia (1)
31. Spain (3)
32. Tunisia (2)
33. Turkey (16)
34. Turkmenistan (7)
35. United States (16)
36. Uzbekistan (4)
37. Venezuela (5)

Russia and Belarus banned from attending all international competitions due to the 2022 Russian invasion of Ukraine.

== Men's results ==
=== 49 kg ===
| Rank | Athlete | Group | Body weight | Snatch (kg) | | | | Clean & Jerk (kg) | | | | Total |
| Rank | Athlete | Group | Body weight | 1 | 2 | 3 | Rank | 1 | 2 | 3 | Rank | Total |
|---|---|---|---|---|---|---|---|---|---|---|---|---|
| 1st place, gold medalist(s) | Alexis Endara (ECU) | A | 48.40 | 78 | 81 | ~~83~~ | 1st place, gold medalist(s) | 95 | 99 | 103 | 1st place, gold medalist(s) | 184 |
| 2nd place, silver medalist(s) | Vijay Prajapati (IND) | A | 48.90 | ~~78~~ | 78 | ~~81~~ | 3rd place, bronze medalist(s) | 93 | 97 | ~~103~~ | 2nd place, silver medalist(s) | 175 |
| 3rd place, bronze medalist(s) | Nino Simeonov (BUL) | A | 48.53 | 78 | ~~82~~ | ~~82~~ | 2nd place, silver medalist(s) | 93 | 96 | ~~99~~ | 3rd place, bronze medalist(s) | 174 |
| 4 | Sosar Tama (IND) | A | 48.70 | 72 | ~~76~~ | ~~77~~ | 6 | 93 | ~~97~~ | ~~98~~ | 4 | 165 |
| 5 | Martin Stanev (BUL) | A | 48.40 | 73 | ~~77~~ | ~~77~~ | 4 | 82 | 86 | 91 | 5 | 164 |
| 6 | Kevin Reto (PER) | A | 48.45 | 68 | 71 | 73 | 5 | 87 | 90 | ~~92~~ | 6 | 163 |

=== 55 kg ===
| Rank | Athlete | Group | Body weight | Snatch (kg) | | | | Clean & Jerk (kg) | | | | Total |
| Rank | Athlete | Group | Body weight | 1 | 2 | 3 | Rank | 1 | 2 | 3 | Rank | Total |
|---|---|---|---|---|---|---|---|---|---|---|---|---|
| 1st place, gold medalist(s) | Sanapathi Gurunaidu (IND) | A | 54.72 | 98 | 102 | 104 | 2nd place, silver medalist(s) | 123 | 126 | ~~130~~ | 1st place, gold medalist(s) | 230 |
| 2nd place, silver medalist(s) | Ali Majed Kalitit (KSA) | A | 54.78 | 99 | 103 | 105 | 1st place, gold medalist(s) | ~~121~~ | 121 | 124 | 4 | 229 |
| 3rd place, bronze medalist(s) | Yerassyl Umarov (KAZ) | A | 54.82 | ~~100~~ | 100 | ~~103~~ | 3rd place, bronze medalist(s) | 117 | 121 | 124 | 3rd place, bronze medalist(s) | 224 |
| 4 | Perhat Bagtyýarow (TKM) | A | 54.90 | 97 | ~~100~~ | ~~100~~ | 6 | 121 | ~~125~~ | 125 | 2nd place, silver medalist(s) | 222 |
| 5 | Giga Odikadze (GEO) | A | 54.35 | 98 | ~~101~~ | ~~101~~ | 4 | 113 | 118 | ~~122~~ | 6 | 216 |
| 6 | Mahmoud Sajir Jebali (TUN) | A | 54.78 | 95 | 98 | ~~101~~ | 5 | 116 | ~~121~~ | ~~122~~ | 10 | 214 |
| 7 | José González (COL) | B | 54.48 | 93 | 96 | ~~99~~ | 7 | 111 | ~~116~~ | 116 | 9 | 212 |
| 8 | Archil Okropiridze (GEO) | A | 54.58 | 93 | ~~97~~ | ~~97~~ | 10 | 115 | 119 | ~~123~~ | 5 | 212 |
| 9 | Benjamín Torres (CHI) | B | 54.50 | 88 | 91 | 94 | 8 | 110 | 117 | ~~120~~ | 7 | 211 |
| 10 | Wilfredo Alemán (MEX) | A | 54.68 | 91 | 94 | ~~96~~ | 9 | 110 | 115 | ~~119~~ | 11 | 209 |
| 11 | Pedro Mis (MEX) | B | 54.72 | 86 | 89 | 92 | 11 | 116 | ~~120~~ | ~~120~~ | 8 | 208 |
| 12 | Reny Vargas (ECU) | B | 54.44 | 80 | 83 | ~~85~~ | 12 | 103 | ~~107~~ | 107 | 13 | 190 |
| — | Dzhan Zarkov (BUL) | B | | ~~83~~ | ~~83~~ | ~~83~~ | — | ~~105~~ | 105 | 107 | 12 | — |

=== 61 kg ===
| Rank | Athlete | Group | Body weight | Snatch (kg) | | | | Clean & Jerk (kg) | | | | Total |
| Rank | Athlete | Group | Body weight | 1 | 2 | 3 | Rank | 1 | 2 | 3 | Rank | Total |
|---|---|---|---|---|---|---|---|---|---|---|---|---|
| 1st place, gold medalist(s) | Engin Kara (TUR) | A | 60.52 | 111 | 114 | ~~117~~ | 1st place, gold medalist(s) | 133 | 136 | ~~140~~ | 2nd place, silver medalist(s) | 250 |
| 2nd place, silver medalist(s) | Mustafa Eliş (TUR) | A | 60.14 | 105 | 108 | 111 | 4 | 138 | ~~141~~ | ~~141~~ | 1st place, gold medalist(s) | 249 |
| 3rd place, bronze medalist(s) | Luis Blandón (COL) | A | 60.70 | 105 | 109 | 112 | 3rd place, bronze medalist(s) | 132 | ~~136~~ | 136 | 3rd place, bronze medalist(s) | 248 |
| 4 | Claudio Scarantino (ITA) | A | 60.84 | 100 | 104 | ~~107~~ | 7 | 125 | 129 | ~~133~~ | 4 | 233 |
| 5 | Luis Peguero (DOM) | A | 60.84 | 100 | 104 | 106 | 6 | ~~123~~ | 125 | ~~130~~ | 5 | 231 |
| 6 | José Camarillo (MEX) | A | 60.06 | 96 | 99 | 101 | 8 | 118 | ~~122~~ | ~~123~~ | 6 | 219 |
| 7 | Ryan McDonald (USA) | A | 60.50 | 91 | 94 | 97 | 9 | 112 | 116 | ~~120~~ | 7 | 213 |
| — | Mohammed Al-Marzouq (KSA) | A | 60.48 | 107 | ~~111~~ | 113 | 2nd place, silver medalist(s) | — | — | — | — | — |
| — | Hubert Pietrzak (POL) | A | 60.76 | 110 | ~~113~~ | ~~113~~ | 5 | ~~135~~ | ~~139~~ | ~~139~~ | — | — |

=== 67 kg ===
| Rank | Athlete | Group | Body weight | Snatch (kg) | | | | Clean & Jerk (kg) | | | | Total |
| Rank | Athlete | Group | Body weight | 1 | 2 | 3 | Rank | 1 | 2 | 3 | Rank | Total |
|---|---|---|---|---|---|---|---|---|---|---|---|---|
| 1st place, gold medalist(s) | Yerassyl Saulebekov (KAZ) | A | 66.78 | ~~123~~ | ~~123~~ | 123 | 1st place, gold medalist(s) | 150 | 154 | 158 | 1st place, gold medalist(s) | 281 |
| 2nd place, silver medalist(s) | Alaaddin Sayın (TUR) | A | 65.48 | 115 | 118 | 121 | 3rd place, bronze medalist(s) | 145 | 151 | 157 | 2nd place, silver medalist(s) | 278 |
| 3rd place, bronze medalist(s) | Bartosz Burski (POL) | A | 66.60 | 112 | 116 | ~~119~~ | 5 | 135 | 146 | 153 | 3rd place, bronze medalist(s) | 269 |
| 4 | Halil İbrahim Akbulut (TUR) | A | 66.22 | 117 | 120 | 122 | 2nd place, silver medalist(s) | 138 | 142 | 146 | 4 | 268 |
| 5 | Ahmed Hamdy (EGY) | A | 65.92 | ~~115~~ | ~~116~~ | 117 | 4 | 120 | 131 | ~~143~~ | 7 | 248 |
| 6 | Erick Estupiñán (ECU) | A | 64.60 | 98 | ~~101~~ | 101 | 7 | 125 | 130 | 136 | 5 | 237 |
| 7 | Israel Tovar (MEX) | A | 66.62 | 93 | 98 | 101 | 6 | 130 | 135 | ~~137~~ | 6 | 236 |
| 8 | Kampu Degio (IND) | A | 62.76 | 95 | 100 | ~~104~~ | 8 | ~~126~~ | ~~126~~ | 126 | 8 | 226 |
| — | Franchesco Elizalde (PER) | A | 66.10 | ~~110~~ | ~~110~~ | — | — | — | — | — | — | — |

=== 73 kg ===
| Rank | Athlete | Group | Body weight | Snatch (kg) | | | | Clean & Jerk (kg) | | | | Total |
| Rank | Athlete | Group | Body weight | 1 | 2 | 3 | Rank | 1 | 2 | 3 | Rank | Total |
|---|---|---|---|---|---|---|---|---|---|---|---|---|
| 1st place, gold medalist(s) | Yedige Yemberdi (KAZ) | A | 72.96 | ~~130~~ | 130 | 134 | 1st place, gold medalist(s) | ~~165~~ | 165 | 172 | 1st place, gold medalist(s) | 306 |
| 2nd place, silver medalist(s) | Diyorbek Ermatov (UZB) | A | 72.68 | 128 | 133 | ~~135~~ | 2nd place, silver medalist(s) | 151 | 154 | 157 | 3rd place, bronze medalist(s) | 290 |
| 3rd place, bronze medalist(s) | Brayan Ibanez (CAN) | A | 72.90 | 127 | ~~132~~ | 132 | 3rd place, bronze medalist(s) | 150 | 153 | 156 | 4 | 288 |
| 4 | Yaşar Karaca (TUR) | A | 72.20 | 118 | ~~122~~ | 123 | 5 | 156 | 158 | ~~166~~ | 2nd place, silver medalist(s) | 281 |
| 5 | Krishna Venkata (IND) | A | 71.30 | 113 | ~~117~~ | 117 | 6 | 142 | 146 | ~~150~~ | 5 | 263 |
| 6 | Héctor Limón (MEX) | A | 72.40 | 108 | 112 | ~~115~~ | 7 | 130 | 135 | ~~138~~ | 7 | 247 |
| 7 | Hidver Silva (PER) | A | 71.44 | 100 | 104 | 107 | 9 | 132 | ~~136~~ | 136 | 6 | 243 |
| — | Iván Rafael Rodríguez (MEX) | A | 72.16 | ~~109~~ | 109 | ~~113~~ | 8 | ~~135~~ | ~~136~~ | ~~136~~ | — | — |
| — | Levan Ochigava (GEO) | A | 72.34 | 121 | 125' | ~~129~~ | 4 | ~~151~~ | ~~151~~ | ~~151~~ | — | — |

=== 81 kg ===
| Rank | Athlete | Group | Body weight | Snatch (kg) | | | | Clean & Jerk (kg) | | | | Total |
| Rank | Athlete | Group | Body weight | 1 | 2 | 3 | Rank | 1 | 2 | 3 | Rank | Total |
|---|---|---|---|---|---|---|---|---|---|---|---|---|
| 1st place, gold medalist(s) | Denis Poluboyarinov (KAZ) | A | 78.15 | 135 | 140 | 143 | 1st place, gold medalist(s) | 170 | 175 | 180 | 1st place, gold medalist(s) | 323 |
| 2nd place, silver medalist(s) | Iacopo Falsinotti (ITA) | A | 80.40 | 127 | 132 | ~~136~~ | 2nd place, silver medalist(s) | 156 | 161 | ~~165~~ | 2nd place, silver medalist(s) | 293 |
| 3rd place, bronze medalist(s) | Ihann Barreras (MEX) | A | 79.72 | 115 | ~~118~~ | 119 | 3rd place, bronze medalist(s) | 151 | 156 | 161 | 3rd place, bronze medalist(s) | 280 |
| 4 | Elkin Ramírez (ECU) | A | 80.60 | 112 | 117 | ~~119~~ | 6 | 145 | 150 | 156 | 5 | 273 |
| 5 | Kyle Martin Jr. (USA) | A | 79.90 | 111 | 115 | ~~118~~ | 7 | 151 | 156 | ~~161~~ | 4 | 271 |
| 6 | Dawid Majsy (POL) | A | 73.88 | ~~117~~ | ~~117~~ | 118 | 5 | 135 | 140 | 145 | 6 | 263 |
| 7 | Kale Bunce (USA) | A | 76.30 | 107 | 112 | ~~116~~ | 8 | 136 | 140 | 144 | 7 | 256 |
| 8 | Nikola Todorović (CRO) | A | 73.50 | 112 | 116 | 118 | 4 | 133 | ~~137~~ | ~~140~~ | 9 | 251 |
| 9 | Jacob Tout (AUS) | A | 78.30 | 105 | ~~110~~ | ~~110~~ | 9 | 133 | ~~139~~ | ~~139~~ | 8 | 238 |

=== 89 kg ===
| Rank | Athlete | Group | Body weight | Snatch (kg) | | | | Clean & Jerk (kg) | | | | Total |
| Rank | Athlete | Group | Body weight | 1 | 2 | 3 | Rank | 1 | 2 | 3 | Rank | Total |
|---|---|---|---|---|---|---|---|---|---|---|---|---|
| 1st place, gold medalist(s) | Mahmoud Hosny (EGY) | A | 86.52 | 140 | 143 | 150 | 1st place, gold medalist(s) | 172 | 175 | 193 | 1st place, gold medalist(s) | 343 |
| 2nd place, silver medalist(s) | Nikoloz Esartia (GEO) | A | 82.20 | 132 | 137 | 141 | 2nd place, silver medalist(s) | 164 | 170 | 174 | 2nd place, silver medalist(s) | 315 |
| 3rd place, bronze medalist(s) | Carlos León (VEN) | A | 88.02 | 123 | ~~125~~ | 125 | 3rd place, bronze medalist(s) | 152 | 155 | ~~161~~ | 3rd place, bronze medalist(s) | 280 |
| 4 | Kacper Dziamski (POL) | A | 85.78 | 112 | 117 | ~~119~~ | 6 | 142 | 147 | 154 | 4 | 271 |
| 5 | David Kolář (CZE) | A | 86.20 | 117 | 121 | 124 | 4 | 142 | 146 | ~~151~~ | 5 | 270 |
| 6 | Julio Arteaga (ECU) | A | 82.84 | 110 | 114 | ~~117~~ | 7 | 140 | 145 | ~~148~~ | 6 | 259 |
| 7 | Michael Davidge Jr. (USA) | A | 87.40 | 112 | 115 | 119 | 5 | ~~139~~ | 139 | ~~144~~ | 7 | 258 |
| 8 | Tristan Gatwood (USA) | A | 85.78 | ~~107~~ | ~~109~~ | 109 | 8 | 125 | 130 | ~~135~~ | 8 | 239 |
| 9 | Jeshua Olivencia (PUR) | A | 87.04 | ~~85~~ | 85 | ~~90~~ | 9 | 110 | ~~120~~ | ~~120~~ | 9 | 195 |

=== 96 kg ===
| Rank | Athlete | Group | Body weight | Snatch (kg) | | | | Clean & Jerk (kg) | | | | Total |
| Rank | Athlete | Group | Body weight | 1 | 2 | 3 | Rank | 1 | 2 | 3 | Rank | Total |
|---|---|---|---|---|---|---|---|---|---|---|---|---|
| 1st place, gold medalist(s) | Gervasi Tabagari (GEO) | A | 92.42 | 134 | 138 | 140 | 1st place, gold medalist(s) | 166 | 170 | 177 | 1st place, gold medalist(s) | 317 |
| 2nd place, silver medalist(s) | Saparly Muhyýew (TKM) | A | 92.00 | ~~133~~ | 133 | ~~139~~ | 2nd place, silver medalist(s) | ~~165~~ | 167 | ~~171~~ | 3rd place, bronze medalist(s) | 300 |
| 3rd place, bronze medalist(s) | Pablo Medina (MEX) | A | 93.75 | 128 | 131 | ~~134~~ | 5 | 161 | 165 | 169 | 2nd place, silver medalist(s) | 300 |
| 4 | Abrorbek Marufbekov (UZB) | A | 93.25 | ~~130~~ | 130 | 133 | 3rd place, bronze medalist(s) | 156 | 161 | 166 | 4 | 299 |
| 5 | Surajbek Sapaýew (TKM) | A | 89.25 | 125 | 129 | 132 | 4 | 155 | 160 | ~~164~~ | 5 | 292 |
| 6 | Marcin Ziółkowski (POL) | A | 89.10 | 112 | 118 | 125 | 6 | 141 | 146 | ~~151~~ | 7 | 271 |
| 7 | Lawrence Hooper (USA) | A | 93.55 | 113 | ~~118~~ | ~~120~~ | 7 | 143 | 150 | ~~155~~ | 6 | 263 |

=== 102 kg ===
| Rank | Athlete | Group | Body weight | Snatch (kg) | | | | Clean & Jerk (kg) | | | | Total |
| Rank | Athlete | Group | Body weight | 1 | 2 | 3 | Rank | 1 | 2 | 3 | Rank | Total |
|---|---|---|---|---|---|---|---|---|---|---|---|---|
| 1st place, gold medalist(s) | Nikita Abdrakhmanov (KAZ) | A | 100.04 | 148 | 153 | 157 | 1st place, gold medalist(s) | 177 | 182 | 191 | 1st place, gold medalist(s) | 348 |
| 2nd place, silver medalist(s) | Kudratbek Salimjonov (UZB) | A | 100.50 | 146 | 151 | 156 | 2nd place, silver medalist(s) | 170 | ~~180~~ | ~~181~~ | 2nd place, silver medalist(s) | 327 |
| 3rd place, bronze medalist(s) | Sami Baki Kıymet (TUR) | A | 96.54 | 126 | ~~131~~ | 132 | 4 | 160 | ~~163~~ | 163 | 3rd place, bronze medalist(s) | 295 |
| 4 | Cristian Bojórquez (MEX) | A | 100.62 | 125 | 130 | 133 | 3rd place, bronze medalist(s) | 150 | 155 | 161 | 4 | 294 |
| 5 | Hans Alomía (ECU) | A | 101.06 | 125 | 131 | ~~134~~ | 5 | 154 | ~~160~~ | 161 | 5 | 292 |

=== +102 kg ===
| Rank | Athlete | Group | Body weight | Snatch (kg) | | | | Clean & Jerk (kg) | | | | Total |
| Rank | Athlete | Group | Body weight | 1 | 2 | 3 | Rank | 1 | 2 | 3 | Rank | Total |
|---|---|---|---|---|---|---|---|---|---|---|---|---|
| 1st place, gold medalist(s) | Vladimír Macura (SVK) | A | | 141 | 146 | 151 | 1st place, gold medalist(s) | 171 | 176 | 181 | 1st place, gold medalist(s) | 332 |
| 2nd place, silver medalist(s) | Jhon Martínez (COL) | A | | 131 | 136 | 140 | 2nd place, silver medalist(s) | ~~165~~ | 165 | 175 | 2nd place, silver medalist(s) | 315 |
| 3rd place, bronze medalist(s) | Marek Gugała (POL) | A | | 130 | 135 | ~~137~~ | 4 | 155 | 162 | 167 | 4 | 302 |
| 4 | José Meza (MEX) | A | | 126 | 131 | 136 | 3rd place, bronze medalist(s) | 151 | 160 | 163 | 5 | 299 |
| 5 | Kevin Asto (ECU) | A | | 125 | ~~131~~ | ~~132~~ | 6 | 160 | 165 | 169 | 3rd place, bronze medalist(s) | 294 |
| 6 | Angel Georgiev (BUL) | A | | 127 | 132 | ~~136~~ | 5 | 150 | 160 | ~~168~~ | 6 | 292 |
| 7 | Roomet Väli (EST) | A | | 110 | 115 | ~~120~~ | 7 | 135 | 136 | ~~143~~ | 7 | 251 |

== Women's results ==
=== 40 kg ===
| Rank | Athlete | Group | Body weight | Snatch (kg) | | | | Clean & Jerk (kg) | | | | Total |
| Rank | Athlete | Group | Body weight | 1 | 2 | 3 | Rank | 1 | 2 | 3 | Rank | Total |
|---|---|---|---|---|---|---|---|---|---|---|---|---|
| 1st place, gold medalist(s) | Lawren Estrada (COL) | A | 39.64 | 48 | 52 | 55 | 2nd place, silver medalist(s) | 68 | 71 | 73 | 1st place, gold medalist(s) | 128 |
| 2nd place, silver medalist(s) | Akanksha Vyavahare (IND) | A | 39.14 | 53 | 56 | 59 | 1st place, gold medalist(s) | 64 | 68 | ~~71~~ | 3rd place, bronze medalist(s) | 127 |
| 3rd place, bronze medalist(s) | Aleksandra Belenko (KAZ) | A | 39.60 | 50 | 53 | 55 | 3rd place, bronze medalist(s) | 66 | 70 | ~~73~~ | 2nd place, silver medalist(s) | 125 |
| 4 | Mansi Chamunda (IND) | A | 39.50 | 48 | 51 | 53 | 5 | 58 | 62 | 64 | 4 | 117 |
| 5 | Aysu Bektaş (TUR) | A | 39.48 | 52 | ~~54~~ | 54 | 4 | 60 | ~~65~~ | ~~65~~ | 6 | 114 |
| 6 | Ceren Akarsu (TUR) | A | 39.86 | 45 | 48 | 50 | 6 | 57 | 63 | ~~66~~ | 5 | 113 |
| 7 | Melany Piaun (ECU) | A | 40.00 | 37 | 40 | 43 | 7 | 48 | ~~52~~ | ~~52~~ | 7 | 91 |

=== 45 kg ===
| Rank | Athlete | Group | Body weight | Snatch (kg) | | | | Clean & Jerk (kg) | | | | Total |
| Rank | Athlete | Group | Body weight | 1 | 2 | 3 | Rank | 1 | 2 | 3 | Rank | Total |
|---|---|---|---|---|---|---|---|---|---|---|---|---|
| 1st place, gold medalist(s) | Rose Jean Ramos (PHI) | A | 44.50 | 65 | 68 | 70 | 2nd place, silver medalist(s) | 80 | 82 | 85 | 1st place, gold medalist(s) | 155 |
| 2nd place, silver medalist(s) | Kerlys Montilla (VEN) | A | 44.70 | 67 | 69 | 71 | 1st place, gold medalist(s) | 82 | ~~84~~ | ~~86~~ | 3rd place, bronze medalist(s) | 153 |
| 3rd place, bronze medalist(s) | Soumya Sunil Dalvi (IND) | A | 44.80 | 62 | 65 | ~~68~~ | 5 | 78 | 81 | 83 | 2nd place, silver medalist(s) | 148 |
| 4 | Naomi Bass (MEX) | A | 44.80 | 60 | 64 | ~~68~~ | 6 | 77 | 80 | ~~83~~ | 4 | 144 |
| 5 | Habiba Saad (EGY) | A | 44.10 | 59 | 63 | 67 | 4 | ~~70~~ | 70 | ~~77~~ | 9 | 137 |
| 6 | Ogulşat Amanowa (TKM) | A | 43.88 | 57 | 59 | 61 | 8 | ~~73~~ | 73 | 75 | 6 | 136 |
| 7 | Ezgi Kılıç (TUR) | A | 44.70 | ~~60~~ | 60 | 62 | 7 | 73 | ~~76~~ | ~~77~~ | 7 | 135 |
| 8 | R Bhavani (IND) | A | 44.44 | 52 | 55 | 57 | 9 | 69 | 72 | 75 | 5 | 132 |
| 9 | Lara Delany (ECU) | A | 44.20 | 52 | ~~55~~ | 55 | 11 | 70 | ~~73~~ | ~~73~~ | 8 | 125 |
| 10 | Harmony Reed (USA) | A | 44.00 | 53 | 55 | ~~57~~ | 10 | 63 | 66 | ~~69~~ | 11 | 121 |
| 11 | Shany Tezen (PER) | A | 44.00 | 47 | 50 | 53 | 12 | 65 | 68 | ~~70~~ | 10 | 121 |
| — | Rosailiz Santana (DOM) | A | 44.90 | ~~66~~ | 66 | 68 | 3rd place, bronze medalist(s) | ~~77~~ | ~~77~~ | ~~77~~ | — | — |

=== 49 kg ===
| Rank | Athlete | Group | Body weight | Snatch (kg) | | | | Clean & Jerk (kg) | | | | Total |
| Rank | Athlete | Group | Body weight | 1 | 2 | 3 | Rank | 1 | 2 | 3 | Rank | Total |
|---|---|---|---|---|---|---|---|---|---|---|---|---|
| 1st place, gold medalist(s) | Luluk Diana Tri Wijayana (INA) | A | 48.44 | 70 | 72 | 75 | 1st place, gold medalist(s) | 90 | 95 | ~~100~~ | 1st place, gold medalist(s) | 170 |
| 2nd place, silver medalist(s) | Oliwia Drzazga (POL) | A | 48.32 | 63 | 66 | 70 | 2nd place, silver medalist(s) | 87 | 91 | ~~96~~ | 2nd place, silver medalist(s) | 161 |
| 3rd place, bronze medalist(s) | Joseline López (MEX) | A | 48.38 | ~~65~~ | 65 | 68 | 5 | ~~85~~ | 85 | ~~88~~ | 4 | 153 |
| 4 | Darya Balabayuk (KAZ) | A | 48.70 | 66 | 69 | ~~71~~ | 3rd place, bronze medalist(s) | 83 | ~~86~~ | ~~86~~ | 5 | 152 |
| 5 | Bahar Kırat (TUR) | A | 48.86 | ~~64~~ | 64 | ~~67~~ | 8 | 83 | 86 | ~~90~~ | 3rd place, bronze medalist(s) | 150 |
| 6 | Nedal Mohamed (EGY) | A | 48.92 | 63 | 67 | ~~69~~ | 6 | ~~80~~ | 80 | ~~87~~ | 8 | 147 |
| 7 | Giovanna Tavares (BRA) | A | 48.64 | ~~64~~ | ~~64~~ | 65 | 7 | ~~81~~ | ~~81~~ | 82 | 7 | 147 |
| 8 | Lucía González (ESP) | A | 48.70 | 59 | 61 | 63 | 9 | 78 | 81 | 83 | 6 | 146 |
| 9 | Tina Angelini (ITA) | A | 48.74 | 65 | 68 | ~~71~~ | 4 | ~~74~~ | 74 | ~~78~~ | 11 | 142 |
| 10 | Jade Morales (USA) | A | 48.56 | 59 | 61 | ~~63~~ | 10 | ~~75~~ | 75 | 78 | 9 | 139 |
| 11 | Jordan Nantz (USA) | A | 48.66 | 57 | 60 | ~~62~~ | 11 | 72 | 75 | ~~77~~ | 10 | 135 |
| 12 | Nayeli Grefa (ECU) | A | 48.28 | 57 | ~~60~~ | ~~61~~ | 12 | 72 | ~~76~~ | ~~76~~ | 12 | 129 |
| 13 | Shawhan Khormi (KSA) | B | 48.40 | 30 | ~~32~~ | 32 | 13 | 35 | ~~37~~ | ~~37~~ | 13 | 67 |

=== 55 kg ===
| Rank | Athlete | Group | Body weight | Snatch (kg) | | | | Clean & Jerk (kg) | | | | Total |
| Rank | Athlete | Group | Body weight | 1 | 2 | 3 | Rank | 1 | 2 | 3 | Rank | Total |
|---|---|---|---|---|---|---|---|---|---|---|---|---|
| 1st place, gold medalist(s) | Tenishia Thornton (MLT) | A | 54.54 | ~~76~~ | 76 | 78 | 1st place, gold medalist(s) | 96 | 98 | 100 | 1st place, gold medalist(s) | 178 |
| 2nd place, silver medalist(s) | Noura Essam (EGY) | A | 53.80 | 72 | ~~76~~ | 76 | 2nd place, silver medalist(s) | 91 | 95 | ~~99~~ | 2nd place, silver medalist(s) | 171 |
| 3rd place, bronze medalist(s) | María Hernández (MEX) | A | 54.38 | 75 | ~~77~~ | ~~77~~ | 3rd place, bronze medalist(s) | 93 | ~~97~~ | ~~97~~ | 3rd place, bronze medalist(s) | 168 |
| 4 | Bhumika Mohite (IND) | A | 54.68 | 68 | ~~72~~ | 72 | 7 | 88 | 92 | ~~97~~ | 6 | 164 |
| 5 | Celine Delia (ITA) | A | 52.68 | 70 | ~~74~~ | ~~74~~ | 10 | 90 | 93 | ~~96~~ | 4 | 163 |
| 6 | Mislina İlhan (TUR) | A | 54.58 | 71 | 74 | ~~76~~ | 4 | 88 | ~~92~~ | ~~92~~ | 9 | 162 |
| 7 | Brithany Moncayo (ECU) | B | 54.08 | 68 | 71 | ~~73~~ | 8 | 82 | 86 | 90 | 7 | 161 |
| 8 | Merna Mohamed (EGY) | A | 54.60 | 70 | 73 | ~~75~~ | 5 | ~~88~~ | 88 | ~~93~~ | 10 | 161 |
| 9 | Zahra Trab (TUN) | A | 54.60 | 72 | ~~74~~ | ~~76~~ | 6 | ~~87~~ | ~~87~~ | 87 | 12 | 159 |
| 10 | Nikita Kamalakar (IND) | A | 54.66 | 67 | ~~70~~ | ~~70~~ | 12 | 92 | ~~96~~ | ~~96~~ | 5 | 159 |
| 11 | Grace Tjerkstra (AUS) | A | 54.44 | ~~70~~ | ~~70~~ | 70 | 11 | 88 | ~~91~~ | ~~91~~ | 8 | 158 |
| 12 | Maria Elena Andras (CAN) | B | 54.84 | ~~68~~ | 68 | 71 | 9 | 80 | 83 | 86 | 13 | 157; |
| 13 | Ava Giorgi (USA) | A | 54.96 | ~~67~~ | ~~67~~ | 67 | 13 | 80 | 83 | 87 | 11 | 154 |
| 14 | Chloe Perkins (AUS) | B | 52.96 | 55 | 58 | 61 | 15 | 74 | ~~77~~ | 79 | 14 | 140 |
| 15 | Manaia Kainuku (NZL) | B | 54.62 | 60 | 63 | 66 | 14 | ~~71~~ | 73 | ~~76~~ | 16 | 139 |
| 16 | Chiara Reljac (CRO) | B | 52.36 | 53 | 56 | 59 | 16 | 73 | ~~77~~ | — | 15 | 132 |

=== 59 kg ===
| Rank | Athlete | Group | Body weight | Snatch (kg) | | | | Clean & Jerk (kg) | | | | Total |
| Rank | Athlete | Group | Body weight | 1 | 2 | 3 | Rank | 1 | 2 | 3 | Rank | Total |
|---|---|---|---|---|---|---|---|---|---|---|---|---|
| 1st place, gold medalist(s) | Dubaney Sinisterra (COL) | A | 56.50 | 78 | 81 | 83 | 2nd place, silver medalist(s) | 99 | 102 | 104 | 1st place, gold medalist(s) | 187 |
| 2nd place, silver medalist(s) | Hanin Ahmed (EGY) | A | 58.02 | 73 | 78 | 82 | 5 | 94 | 101 | 103 | 2nd place, silver medalist(s) | 185 |
| 3rd place, bronze medalist(s) | Jéssica Palacios (ECU) | A | 58.02 | 78 | 81 | 83 | 1st place, gold medalist(s) | 99 | ~~103~~ | ~~103~~ | 4 | 183 |
| 4 | Charlotte Simoneau (CAN) | A | 58.88 | 79 | 82 | ~~84~~ | 4 | 98 | ~~102~~ | ~~102~~ | 5 | 180 |
| 5 | Paola Núñez (MEX) | B | 58.14 | 74 | 77 | 80 | 6 | 90 | ~~94~~ | 95 | 7 | 175 |
| 6 | Bárbara Carvajal (MEX) | B | 58.96 | 70 | 72 | 75 | 8 | 95 | 100 | ~~102~~ | 3rd place, bronze medalist(s) | 175 |
| 7 | Alina Koliushko (KAZ) | A | 58.30 | 74 | 78 | ~~83~~ | 7 | 92 | 96 | ~~99~~ | 6 | 174 |
| 8 | Greta De Riso (ITA) | A | 56.58 | ~~70~~ | 70 | 74 | 10 | 88 | ~~91~~ | 92 | 8 | 166 |
| 9 | Gülälek Kakamyradowa (TKM) | A | 58.74 | ~~74~~ | 74 | ~~77~~ | 9 | 85 | 88 | 91 | 9 | 165 |
| 10 | Zuzanna Ślipek (POL) | B | 58.58 | 72 | ~~75~~ | ~~76~~ | 12 | 89 | ~~93~~ | ~~94~~ | 10 | 161 |
| 11 | Sandra Nævdal (NOR) | B | 57.60 | ~~72~~ | ~~72~~ | 72 | 11 | ~~85~~ | 85 | ~~88~~ | 12 | 157 |
| 12 | Ankita (IND) | B | 58.26 | 68 | ~~72~~ | ~~72~~ | 13 | 84 | ~~88~~ | 88 | 11 | 156 |
| 13 | Tayla Stephens (AUS) | B | 57.90 | 61 | 64 | 66 | 14 | 78 | 82 | 85 | 13 | 151 |
| — | Medine Amanowa (TKM) | A | 58.46 | ~~80~~ | 81 | 83 | 3rd place, bronze medalist(s) | ~~102~~ | ~~103~~ | ~~105~~ | — | — |

=== 64 kg ===
| Rank | Athlete | Group | Body weight | Snatch (kg) | | | | Clean & Jerk (kg) | | | | Total |
| Rank | Athlete | Group | Body weight | 1 | 2 | 3 | Rank | 1 | 2 | 3 | Rank | Total |
|---|---|---|---|---|---|---|---|---|---|---|---|---|
| 1st place, gold medalist(s) | Ingrid Segura (COL) | A | | 87 | 91 | 94 | 1st place, gold medalist(s) | 107 | 112 | 117 | 1st place, gold medalist(s) | 211 |
| 2nd place, silver medalist(s) | Nadezhda Li (KAZ) | A | | 80 | 83 | 85 | 2nd place, silver medalist(s) | 100 | ~~104~~ | 105 | 4 | 190 |
| 3rd place, bronze medalist(s) | Keily Silva (VEN) | A | | 80 | ~~84~~ | 84 | 3rd place, bronze medalist(s) | 100 | 103 | ~~107~~ | 5 | 187 |
| 4 | Martyna Dołęga (POL) | A | | 78 | 81 | ~~84~~ | 4 | 95 | ~~100~~ | 101 | 6 | 182 |
| 5 | Brianna Marquez (USA) | B | | 73 | 76 | ~~79~~ | 7 | 102 | 105 | ~~108~~ | 3rd place, bronze medalist(s) | 181 |
| 6 | Anna Sierra (USA) | A | | ~~75~~ | ~~75~~ | 75 | 10 | ~~100~~ | 101 | 106 | 2nd place, silver medalist(s) | 181 |
| 7 | Laura García (ESP) | A | | 76 | ~~78~~ | 78 | 5 | ~~96~~ | 96 | 98 | 7 | 176 |
| 8 | Vanessa Andrade (MEX) | A | | 74 | 77 | ~~79~~ | 6 | 94 | 97 | ~~101~~ | 8 | 174 |
| 9 | Canan Korçak (TUR) | A | | 76 | ~~79~~ | ~~79~~ | 8 | 93 | ~~96~~ | 96 | 9 | 172 |
| 10 | Jaqueline Calixto (ECU) | B | | 68 | 71 | 75 | 9 | 89 | 93 | ~~95~~ | 11 | 168 |
| 11 | Jennifer Pacheco (MEX) | A | | 74 | ~~77~~ | ~~77~~ | 12 | 93 | ~~95~~ | ~~96~~ | 12 | 167 |
| 12 | Nya Hayman (AUS) | B | | 67 | 70 | 74 | 11 | 85 | 88 | 92 | 13 | 166 |
| 13 | Jheysi Paredes (PER) | A | | 67 | 70 | 73 | 13 | 89 | 90 | ~~94~~ | 14 | 163 |
| 14 | Layla Bloom (AUS) | B | | 61 | 64 | 67 | 14 | 86 | 90 | 94 | 10 | 161 |

=== 71 kg ===
| Rank | Athlete | Group | Body weight | Snatch (kg) | | | | Clean & Jerk (kg) | | | | Total |
| Rank | Athlete | Group | Body weight | 1 | 2 | 3 | Rank | 1 | 2 | 3 | Rank | Total |
|---|---|---|---|---|---|---|---|---|---|---|---|---|
| 1st place, gold medalist(s) | Mia Rhodes (USA) | A | 69.52 | 87 | 90 | 92 | 1st place, gold medalist(s) | 104 | 107 | 110 | 1st place, gold medalist(s) | 202 |
| 2nd place, silver medalist(s) | Janette Ylisoini (FIN) | A | 70.42 | 86 | 89 | ~~92~~ | 3rd place, bronze medalist(s) | ~~106~~ | 106 | ~~111~~ | 2nd place, silver medalist(s) | 195 |
| 3rd place, bronze medalist(s) | Burcu Gerçekden (TUR) | A | 70.48 | 88 | 91 | ~~93~~ | 2nd place, silver medalist(s) | ~~103~~ | ~~103~~ | 103 | 5 | 194 |
| 4 | Arianna Hernández (VEN) | A | 70.54 | 81 | 85 | 87 | 4 | 98 | ~~102~~ | 102 | 6 | 189 |
| 5 | Ivanna Cerquera (COL) | A | 70.46 | 80 | 83 | ~~85~~ | 7 | 100 | 104 | ~~107~~ | 3rd place, bronze medalist(s) | 187 |
| 6 | Naomie Lusignan (CAN) | A | 68.78 | 79 | 82 | 84 | 5 | ~~99~~ | 101 | ~~103~~ | 7 | 185 |
| 7 | Úlfhildur Unnarsdóttir (ISL) | A | 70.14 | 80 | 84 | ~~87~~ | 6 | 100 | ~~103~~ | ~~104~~ | 9 | 181 |
| 8 | Bergrós Björnsdóttir (ISL) | A | 70.96 | 75 | 78 | 81 | 8 | 95 | 100 | ~~103~~ | 8 | 181 |
| 9 | Janna Abdelfattah (EGY) | A | 70.10 | 70 | 75 | 78 | 10 | 92 | 100 | 103 | 4 | 181 |
| 10 | Amira Mohamed (EGY) | A | 69.26 | 75 | ~~81~~ | 81 | 9 | 88 | 95 | ~~100~~ | 10 | 176 |
| 11 | Mia Quiñones (PUR) | A | 68.10 | ~~62~~ | 62 | 69 | 11 | 83 | ~~88~~ | ~~90~~ | 11 | 152 |
| — | Jomayra Rivera (PUR) | A | 69.42 | 62 | 64 | ~~69~~ | 12 | ~~84~~ | ~~84~~ | ~~84~~ | — | — |
| — | Erika Ruiz (ESP) | A | 70.94 | — | — | — | — | — | — | — | — | — |

=== 76 kg ===
| Rank | Athlete | Group | Body weight | Snatch (kg) | | | | Clean & Jerk (kg) | | | | Total |
| Rank | Athlete | Group | Body weight | 1 | 2 | 3 | Rank | 1 | 2 | 3 | Rank | Total |
|---|---|---|---|---|---|---|---|---|---|---|---|---|
| 1st place, gold medalist(s) | Rahma Ahmed (EGY) | A | 75.46 | 90 | 92 | 95 | 1st place, gold medalist(s) | 114 | 120 | ~~125~~ | 1st place, gold medalist(s) | 215 |
| 2nd place, silver medalist(s) | Nigora Suvonova (UZB) | A | 75.46 | 87 | ~~91~~ | 91 | 2nd place, silver medalist(s) | 113 | 119 | ~~122~~ | 2nd place, silver medalist(s) | 210 |
| 3rd place, bronze medalist(s) | Estefany Espinoza (MEX) | A | 75.32 | 83 | 87 | 90 | 3rd place, bronze medalist(s) | 110 | ~~115~~ | ~~115~~ | 3rd place, bronze medalist(s) | 200 |
| 4 | Isabella Rivera (USA) | A | 73.34 | 83 | 86 | ~~89~~ | 4 | 100 | 104 | 108 | 4 | 194 |
| 5 | Basmala Khaled (EGY) | A | 75.16 | 81 | 85 | ~~88~~ | 5 | 100 | 106 | ~~112~~ | 6 | 85 |
| 6 | Lea Berle Horne (NOR) | A | 74.98 | 80 | 82 | 84 | 7 | 103 | 107 | ~~111~~ | 5 | 191 |
| 7 | Mariangela Martínez (VEN) | A | 75.26 | 79 | 82 | 84 | 6 | 103 | 106 | ~~109~~ | 7 | 190 |
| 8 | Ayshe Mehmedova (BUL) | A | 72.68 | 70 | 75 | ~~78~~ | 8 | 90 | 95 | 97 | 8 | 172 |

=== 81 kg ===
| Rank | Athlete | Group | Body weight | Snatch (kg) | | | | Clean & Jerk (kg) | | | | Total |
| Rank | Athlete | Group | Body weight | 1 | 2 | 3 | Rank | 1 | 2 | 3 | Rank | Total |
|---|---|---|---|---|---|---|---|---|---|---|---|---|
| 1st place, gold medalist(s) | Büşra Çan (TUR) | A | 80.84 | 90 | ~~93~~ | 94 | 2nd place, silver medalist(s) | 112 | 118 | ~~121~~ | 1st place, gold medalist(s) | 212 |
| 2nd place, silver medalist(s) | Mayrin Hernández (MEX) | A | 79.98 | 91 | 93 | 95 | 1st place, gold medalist(s) | 110 | 116 | ~~120~~ | 2nd place, silver medalist(s) | 211 |
| 3rd place, bronze medalist(s) | Shams Mohamed (EGY) | A | 79.24 | 88 | 92 | ~~95~~ | 3rd place, bronze medalist(s) | 109 | 115 | ~~121~~ | 3rd place, bronze medalist(s) | 207 |
| 4 | Änamjan Rustamowa (TKM) | A | 80.46 | 88 | 90 | ~~93~~ | 4 | 108 | 111 | 114 | 4 | 204 |
| 5 | Kaylee Landa (USA) | A | 79.66 | ~~80~~ | 80 | 82 | 5 | 92 | ~~97~~ | 99 | 5 | 181 |
| 6 | Angie Sánchez (ECU) | A | 80.70 | 73 | 76 | 80 | 6 | 91 | 96 | ~~100~~ | 6 | 176 |

=== +81 kg ===
| Rank | Athlete | Group | Body weight | Snatch (kg) | | | | Clean & Jerk (kg) | | | | Total |
| Rank | Athlete | Group | Body weight | 1 | 2 | 3 | Rank | 1 | 2 | 3 | Rank | Total |
|---|---|---|---|---|---|---|---|---|---|---|---|---|
| 1st place, gold medalist(s) | Yairan Tysforod (COL) | A | 109.26 | 95 | 98 | 100 | 1st place, gold medalist(s) | 115 | 118 | 121 | 1st place, gold medalist(s) | 221 |
| 2nd place, silver medalist(s) | Fatmagül Çevik (TUR) | A | 103.86 | 93 | 96 | 99 | 2nd place, silver medalist(s) | 113 | 117 | 120 | 2nd place, silver medalist(s) | 219 |
| 3rd place, bronze medalist(s) | Tuana Süren (TUR) | A | 92.30 | 92 | ~~95~~ | 95 | 4 | 111 | 116 | ~~122~~ | 3rd place, bronze medalist(s) | 211 |
| 4 | Johanna Pfeilstöcker (AUT) | A | 104.06 | 91 | 94 | 96 | 3rd place, bronze medalist(s) | 104 | ~~109~~ | ~~109~~ | 8 | 200 |
| 5 | Angel Billen (CAN) | A | 98.52 | ~~82~~ | 82 | 86 | 7 | 110 | 113 | ~~117~~ | 4 | 199 |
| 6 | Leydi Pavón (ECU) | A | 118.46 | 82 | 85 | 88 | 5 | 105 | 109 | ~~112~~ | 5 | 197 |
| 7 | Perla Gabriel (MEX) | A | 102.84 | 80 | 83 | 87 | 6 | ~~100~~ | 100 | 106 | 7 | 193 |
| 8 | Malia Levy (USA) | A | 115.36 | 77 | 80 | ~~83~~ | 8 | 102 | 107 | ~~111~~ | 6 | 187 |
| 9 | Valentina Rojas (CHI) | A | 86.86 | 70 | 75 | ~~77~~ | 9 | 90 | 95 | 98 | 9 | 173 |
