= Weightlifting at the 2024 Bolivarian Youth Games =

Weightlifting competitions at the 2024 Bolivarian Youth Games

- Weightlifting pictogram
- Venue: Estadio Olímpico Patria
- Dates: 4–6 April 2024
- Competitors: 81 from 7 nations

Champions
- Venezuela (9 gold, 9 silver, 2 Bronze)

Weightlifting competitions at the 2024 Bolivarian Youth Games in Sucre, Bolivia were held from 4 to 6 April 2024 at Estadio Olímpico Patria Third Stage – Complejo Prof. Rafael Calvo.

Twenty medal events were scheduled to be contested in ten body weight categories for each boys and girls. A total of 81 athletes (41 boys and 40 girls) competed in the events. Athletes must have been born between 1 January 2006 and 31 December 2009 to be eligible (ages 15 to 18).

Venezuela won the weightlifting competitions with a total of 20 medals, 9 gold, 9 silver and 2 bronze.

== Schedule ==
The competitions were held over a 3-day period:

F	Final

Men
Date Event	Thu 4	Fri 5	Sat 6
Boys' 49 kg	F		
Boys' 55 kg	F		
Boys' 61 kg	F		
Boys' 67 kg	F		
Boys' 73 kg		F	
Boys' 81 kg		F	
Boys' 89 kg		F	
Boys' 96 kg		F	
Boys' 102 kg			F
Boys' +102 kg			F

Women
Date Event	Thu 4	Fri 5	Sat 6
Girls' 40 kg	F		
Girls' 45 kg	F		
Girls' 49 kg	F		
Girls' 55 kg	F		
Girls' 59 kg		F	
Girls' 64 kg		F	
Girls' 71 kg		F	
Girls' 76 kg		F	
Girls' 81 kg			F
Girls' +81 kg			F

== Participating nations ==
A total of 6 National Olympic Committees (NOCs) registered athletes for the weightlifting competitions. Each NOC was able to enter a maximum of 20 weightlifters (10 per gender) and each weightlifter could only participate in one body weight category.

Numbers in parentheses indicate the number of weightlifters entered the competition by each NOC.

- Bolivia (11)
- Chile (6)
- Colombia (20)
- Ecuador (10)
- Panama (2)
- Peru (12)
- Venezuela (20)

== Medal summary ==
=== Medal table ===
* Host nation (Bolivia)

Rank	NOC	Gold	Silver	Bronze	Total
1	Venezuela (VEN)	9	9	2	20
2	Colombia (COL)	8	8	3	19
3	Ecuador (ECU)	2	1	4	7
4	Peru (PER)	1	0	6	7
5	Chile (CHI)	0	2	3	5
6	Bolivia (BOL)*	0	0	1	1
Totals (6 entries)		20	20	19	59

Source: I Bolivarian Youth Games Sucre 2024 – Weightlifting medals

=== Boys medalists ===
Event	Gold		Silver		Bronze	
49 kg	Freddy Bustillo; Colombia	195 kg	Neidago Briñez; Venezuela	182 kg	Elkin Betancourt; Ecuador	179 kg
55 kg	Samuel Andrade; Colombia	225 kg	Lissandro Rivero; Venezuela	209 kg	Samuel Inuma; Peru	198 kg
61 kg	Santiago Rincón; Colombia	244 kg	Dionangel Vargas; Venezuela	238 kg	Jimmy López; Ecuador	222 kg
67 kg	Jan Carlos Panameño; Colombia	246 kg	Alexander Mota; Venezuela	230 kg	José Manuel Fernández; Peru	195 kg
73 kg	Luis Osuna; Colombia	251 kg	Sebastián Torres; Chile	250 kg	Jesús Boutto; Venezuela	238 kg
81 kg	Ángel Rodríguez; Venezuela	320 kg	Juan Marín; Colombia	277 kg	José Teca; Ecuador	257 kg
89 kg	Mauricio Loaiza; Venezuela	311 kg	Vicente Braulio; Ecuador	295 kg	Jhon Murillo; Colombia	292 kg
96 kg	Ronaldo Montoya; Venezuela	288 kg	Sergio Peñaranda; Colombia	268 kg	César Alemán; Peru	180 kg
102 kg	César Luna; Venezuela	275 kg	Cristian Bermúdez; Colombia	250 kg	Jhosue Castro; Peru	208 kg
+102 kg	Luis Espinosa; Venezuela	304 kg	Maximiliano Copello; Chile	256 kg	Not awarded	

=== Girls medalists ===
Event	Gold		Silver		Bronze	
40 kg	Roimary Brito; Venezuela	122 kg	Nafer Cardona; Colombia	109 kg	Doménica Endara; Ecuador	108 kg
45 kg	Lawren Estrada; Colombia	149 kg	Wiliandrys Caldera; Venezuela	134 kg	Katy Bahamondes; Chile	103 kg
49 kg	Katerin Olivera; Peru	155 kg	Bárbara González; Venezuela	142 kg	Mayra Parra; Colombia	140 kg
55 kg	Brithany Moncayo; Ecuador	180 kg	Gelen Torres; Colombia	179 kg	Roxines Polanco; Venezuela	161 kg
59 kg	Yilihannys Jiménez; Venezuela	184 kg	Jineth Pérez; Colombia	163 kg	Mayumi Silva; Peru	145 kg
64 kg	Claudia Rengifo; Venezuela	204 kg	Jeissy Solano; Colombia	176 kg	Jheysi Paredes; Peru	169 kg
71 kg	Ingrid Segura; Colombia	215 kg	Keily Silva; Venezuela	211 kg	Constanza Mayorga; Chile	181 kg
76 kg	Ivanna Cerquera; Colombia	206 kg	Sahara Ochoa; Venezuela	196 kg	Madelein Quispe; Bolivia	80 kg
81 kg	Martha Bolaños; Ecuador	201 kg	Lidysmar Aparicio; Venezuela	200 kg	Maricela Segura; Colombia	195 kg
+81 kg	Bábara Mendoza; Venezuela	203 kg	Karen Mancilla; Colombia	201 kg	Victoria Barrientos; Chile	183 kg

== Results ==
=== Boy's events ===
Boys' 49 kg
Rank	Athlete	Nation	Body weight	Snatch (kg)				Clean & Jerk (kg)				Total
Rank	Athlete	Nation	Body weight	1	2	3	BS	1	2	3	BCJ	Total
1st place, gold medalist(s)	Freddy Bustillo	Colombia	48.15	80	83	85	85	100	106	110	110	195
2nd place, silver medalist(s)	Neidago Briñez	Venezuela	48.45	75	79	(82)	79	96	100	106	103	182
3rd place, bronze medalist(s)	Elkin Betancourt	Ecuador	48.60	75	79	(81)	79	(98)	100	(104)	100	179
—	Josue Ávalos	Bolivia	48.70	47	50	(53)	50	(60)	(60)	(60)	—	—

Boys' 55 kg
Rank	Athlete	Nation	Body weight	Snatch (kg)				Clean & Jerk (kg)				Total
Rank	Athlete	Nation	Body weight	1	2	3	BS	1	2	3	BCJ	Total
1st place, gold medalist(s)	Samuel Andrade	Colombia	54.05	93	97	100	100	120	125	(127)	125	225
2nd place, silver medalist(s)	Lissandro Rivero	Venezuela	54.50	87	(93)	93	93	112	116	(121)	116	209
3rd place, bronze medalist(s)	Michael Inuma	Peru	54.75	(86)	(86)	86	86	108	112	(117)	112	198
—	Leo Saúl Chambi	Bolivia	53.75	(57)	(57)	(57)	—	—	—	—	—	—

Boys' 61 kg
Rank	Athlete	Nation	Body weight	Snatch (kg)				Clean & Jerk (kg)				Total
Rank	Athlete	Nation	Body weight	1	2	3	BS	1	2	3	BCJ	Total
1st place, gold medalist(s)	Santiago Rincón	Colombia	60.05	104	107	109	109	128	132	135	135	244
2nd place, silver medalist(s)	Dionangel Vargas	Venezuela	60.25	102	105	107	107	125	131	(135)	131	238
3rd place, bronze medalist(s)	Jimmy López	Ecuador	60.50	96	102	105	105	123	(128)	128	128	233
—	Alex Tapia	Bolivia	59.35	50	54	(58)	54	70	75	(80)	75	129

Boys' 67 kg
Rank	Athlete	Nation	Body weight	Snatch (kg)				Clean & Jerk (kg)				Total
Rank	Athlete	Nation	Body weight	1	2	3	BS	1	2	3	BCJ	Total
1st place, gold medalist(s)	Jan Carlos Panameño	Colombia	66.45	106	110	(112)	110	130	133	136	136	246
2nd place, silver medalist(s)	Alexander Mota	Venezuela	60.55	95	100	103	103	124	127	(132)	127	230
3rd place, bronze medalist(s)	José Manuel Fernández	Peru	61.35	80	84	87	87	100	105	108	108	195

Boys' 73 kg
Rank	Athlete	Nation	Body weight	Snatch (kg)				Clean & Jerk (kg)				Total
Rank	Athlete	Nation	Body weight	1	2	3	BS	1	2	3	BCJ	Total
1st place, gold medalist(s)	Luis Miguel Osuna	Colombia	71.45	110	(113)	(113)	110	135	139	141	141	251
2nd place, silver medalist(s)	Sebastián Torres	Chile	72.65	98	105	110	110	129	136	140	140	250
3rd place, bronze medalist(s)	Jesús Boutto	Venezuela	68.70	105	111	(115)	111	127	(133)	(133)	127	238
4	Jeremy Morales	Ecuador	72.85	105	110	(113)	110	(123)	123	(140)	123	233
5	Benjamín Ardines	Panama	72.85	(95)	95	(100)	95	(115)	118	(123)	118	213
6	Nacor Pezo	Peru	72.60	(80)	80	85	85	105	(110)	110	110	195
7	Kevin Vargas	Bolivia	70.95	55	58	(62)	58	60	68	75	75	133

Boys' 81 kg
Rank	Athlete	Nation	Body weight	Snatch (kg)				Clean & Jerk (kg)				Total
Rank	Athlete	Nation	Body weight	1	2	3	BS	1	2	3	BCJ	Total
1st place, gold medalist(s)	Ángel Rodríguez	Venezuela	76.70	130	137	145	145	160	170	175	175	320
2nd place, silver medalist(s)	Juan Marín	Colombia	80.05	120	125	130	130	141	147	(152)	147	277
3rd place, bronze medalist(s)	José Teca	Ecuador	80.45	107	(110)	—	107	145	(150)	150	150	257
4	Héctor López	Peru	80.40	80	85	90	90	105	110	115	115	205
5	Jhamil González	Bolivia	76.75	50	55	(58)	55	65	73	80	80	135

Boys' 89 kg
Rank	Athlete	Nation	Body weight	Snatch (kg)				Clean & Jerk (kg)				Total
Rank	Athlete	Nation	Body weight	1	2	3	BS	1	2	3	BCJ	Total
1st place, gold medalist(s)	Mauricio Loaiza	Venezuela	83.00	132	137	141	141	160	170	(177)	170	311
2nd place, silver medalist(s)	Vicente Braulio	Ecuador	86.15	130	135	(140)	135	150	(157)	160	160	295
3rd place, bronze medalist(s)	Jhon Murillo	Colombia	85.30	127	132	135	135	157	(160)	(160)	157	292
4	Matías Moreno	Chile	88.95	120	(125)	(125)	120	140	145	150	150	270

Boys' 96 kg
Rank	Athlete	Nation	Body weight	Snatch (kg)				Clean & Jerk (kg)				Total
Rank	Athlete	Nation	Body weight	1	2	3	BS	1	2	3	BCJ	Total
1st place, gold medalist(s)	Ronaldo Montoya	Venezuela	92.30	123	128	(135)	128	150	(160)	160	160	288
2nd place, silver medalist(s)	Sergio Peñaranda	Colombia	89.60	115	120	123	123	135	145	(150)	145	268
3rd place, bronze medalist(s)	César Alemán	Peru	90.70	80	85	(90)	85	(95)	95	(100)	95	180

Boys' 102 kg
Rank	Athlete	Nation	Body weight	Snatch (kg)				Clean & Jerk (kg)				Total
Rank	Athlete	Nation	Body weight	1	2	3	BS	1	2	3	BCJ	Total
1st place, gold medalist(s)	César Luna	Venezuela		112	120	(128)	120	(145)	145	155	155	275
2nd place, silver medalist(s)	Cristian Bermúdez	Colombia		100	105	110	110	125	133	140	140	250
3rd place, bronze medalist(s)	Jhosue Castro	Peru		85	92	96	96	105	112	(115)	112	208
4	Pablo Limachi	Bolivia		42	47	50	50	52	55	62	62	112

Boys' +102 kg
Rank	Athlete	Nation	Body weight	Snatch (kg)				Clean & Jerk (kg)				Total
Rank	Athlete	Nation	Body weight	1	2	3	BS	1	2	3	BCJ	Total
1st place, gold medalist(s)	Luis Espinosa	Venezuela		125	130	134	134	157	165	170	170	304
2nd place, silver medalist(s)	Maximiliano Copello	Chile		110	116	(123)	116	132	140	(148)	140	256
—	José Urrego	Colombia		123	127	130	130	(160)	(160)	—	—	DNF

=== Girls' events ===
Girls' 40 kg
Rank	Athlete	Nation	Body weight	Snatch (kg)				Clean & Jerk (kg)				Total
Rank	Athlete	Nation	Body weight	1	2	3	BS	1	2	3	BCJ	Total
1st place, gold medalist(s)	Roimary Brito	Venezuela	39.50	49	53	(56)	53	60	64	69	69	122
2nd place, silver medalist(s)	Nafer Cardona	Colombia	39.85	42	45	47	47	55	60	62	62	109
3rd place, bronze medalist(s)	Doménica Endara	Ecuador	39.20	43	46	48	48	55	58	60	60	108

Girls' 45 kg
Rank	Athlete	Nation	Body weight	Snatch (kg)				Clean & Jerk (kg)				Total
Rank	Athlete	Nation	Body weight	1	2	3	BS	1	2	3	BCJ	Total
1st place, gold medalist(s)	Lawren Estrada	Colombia	43.50	60	63	65	65	75	80	84	84	149
2nd place, silver medalist(s)	Wiliandrys Caldera	Venezuela	44.00	51	57	(61)	57	65	72	77	77	134
3rd place, bronze medalist(s)	Katy Bahamondes	Chile	44.15	(40)	40	43	43	53	57	60	60	103
—	Andrea Domínguez	Peru	44.15	35	(38)	38	38	46	(49)	49	49	87

Girls' 49 kg
Rank	Athlete	Nation	Body weight	Snatch (kg)				Clean & Jerk (kg)				Total
Rank	Athlete	Nation	Body weight	1	2	3	BS	1	2	3	BCJ	Total
1st place, gold medalist(s)	Katerin Olivera	Peru	48.60	65	68	71	71	81	84	(87)	84	155
2nd place, silver medalist(s)	Bárbara González	Venezuela	47.70	55	59	62	62	76	80	(83)	80	142
3rd place, bronze medalist(s)	Mayra Parra	Colombia	48.55	60	(64)	64	64	76	(80)	(80)	76	140

Girls' 55 kg
Rank	Athlete	Nation	Body weight	Snatch (kg)				Clean & Jerk (kg)				Total
Rank	Athlete	Nation	Body weight	1	2	3	BS	1	2	3	BCJ	Total
1st place, gold medalist(s)	Brithany Moncayo	Ecuador	54.30	76	79	(82)	79	94	101	(103)	101	180
2nd place, silver medalist(s)	Gelen Torres	Colombia	53.85	78	81	83	83	92	96	(100)	96	179
3rd place, bronze medalist(s)	Roxines Polanco	Venezuela	51.30	63	(69)	69	69	85	92	(94)	92	161
4	Eloisa Vásquez	Bolivia	54.60	56	58	(60)	58	(75)	75	(78)	75	133
5	Lizquet Michi	Peru	50.80	48	51	54	54	63	67	70	70	124

Girls' 59 kg
Rank	Athlete	Nation	Body weight	Snatch (kg)				Clean & Jerk (kg)				Total
Rank	Athlete	Nation	Body weight	1	2	3	BS	1	2	3	BCJ	Total
1st place, gold medalist(s)	Yilihannys Jiménez	Venezuela	58.35	76	79	82	82	97	102	(105)	102	184
2nd place, silver medalist(s)	Jineth Pérez	Colombia	56.20	73	76	(78)	76	(85)	85	87	87	163
3rd place, bronze medalist(s)	Mayumi Silva	Peru	57.35	61	64	67	67	75	78	(81)	78	145
4	Analí Capia	Bolivia	58.20	55	60	(63)	60	77	(80)	(81)	77	137

Girls' 64 kg
Rank	Athlete	Nation	Body weight	Snatch (kg)				Clean & Jerk (kg)				Total
Rank	Athlete	Nation	Body weight	1	2	3	BS	1	2	3	BCJ	Total
1st place, gold medalist(s)	Claudia Rengifo	Venezuela	63.65	85	90	83	93	105	(111)	111	111	204
2nd place, silver medalist(s)	Jeissy Solano	Colombia	61.00	73	76	78	78	93	96	98	98	176
3rd place, bronze medalist(s)	Jheysi Paredes	Peru	63.55	71	74	77	77	92	(96)	(96)	92	169
4	Litzy Villa	Ecuador	62.20	68	72	(75)	72	90	(97)	(97)	90	162
5	Vania Posta	Bolivia	60.65	35	(40)	40	40	45	50	53	53	93

Girls' 71 kg
Rank	Athlete	Nation	Body weight	Snatch (kg)				Clean & Jerk (kg)				Total
Rank	Athlete	Nation	Body weight	1	2	3	BS	1	2	3	BCJ	Total
1st place, gold medalist(s)	Ingrid Segura	Colombia	66.35	93	(96)	(96)	93	114	119	122	122	215
2nd place, silver medalist(s)	Keily Silva	Venezuela	65.55	90	(94)	95	95	(108)	108	116	116	206
3rd place, bronze medalist(s)	Constanza Mayorga	Chile	70.00	74	78	80	80	94	98	101	101	181
4	Kelly Aparicio	Panama	68.85	70	75	79	79	96	100	(103)	100	179
5	Romina Saavedra	Peru	64.85	55	58	(61)	58	73	(77)	77	77	135
6	Luciana Vargas	Bolivia	66.50	(40)	45	(50)	45	55	59	(62)	59	104

Girls' 76 kg
Rank	Athlete	Nation	Body weight	Snatch (kg)				Clean & Jerk (kg)				Total
Rank	Athlete	Nation	Body weight	1	2	3	BS	1	2	3	BCJ	Total
1st place, gold medalist(s)	Ivanna Cerquera	Colombia	72.25	83	87	90	90	110	113	116	116	206
2nd place, silver medalist(s)	Sahara Ochoa	Venezuela	71.75	83	87	90	90	106	(112)	(112)	106	196
3rd place, bronze medalist(s)	Madelein Quispe	Bolivia	74.45	33	37	(45)	37	35	43	(48)	43	80

Girls' 81 kg
Rank	Athlete	Nation	Body weight	Snatch (kg)				Clean & Jerk (kg)				Total
Rank	Athlete	Nation	Body weight	1	2	3	BS	1	2	3	BCJ	Total
1st place, gold medalist(s)	Martha Bolaños	Ecuador		85	90	(94)	90	106	111	(114)	111	201
2nd place, silver medalist(s)	Lidysmar Aparicio	Venezuela		82	87	91	91	105	109	(112)	109	200
3rd place, bronze medalist(s)	Maricela Segura	Colombia		80	83	(86)	83	108	112	(117)	112	195

Girls' +81 kg
Rank	Athlete	Nation	Body weight	Snatch (kg)				Clean & Jerk (kg)				Total
Rank	Athlete	Nation	Body weight	1	2	3	BS	1	2	3	BCJ	Total
1st place, gold medalist(s)	Bábara Mendoza	Venezuela		85	90	94	94	105	109	(114)	109	203
2nd place, silver medalist(s)	Karen Mancilla	Colombia		83	87	89	89	107	112	(115)	112	201
3rd place, bronze medalist(s)	Victoria Barrientos	Chile		76	(80)	80	80	96	99	103	103	183
4	Thaira Castro	Ecuador		76	79	82	82	90	(95)	95	95	177
