= 2026 World Youth Weightlifting Championships =

2026 IWF World Youth Championships
- Venue: Coliseo El Pueblo
- Location: Cali, Colombia
- Dates: 5–11 July
- Competitors: 207 from 44 nations

The 2026 Youth World Weightlifting Championships were held in Cali, Colombia, from 5 to 11 July 2026.

== Medal table ==
Ranking by Big (Total result) medals

* Host nation (Colombia)

Rank	Nation	Gold	Silver	Bronze	Total
1	Georgia	2	1	2	5
2	Philippines	1	4	1	6
3	Turkey	1	4	0	5
4	Turkmenistan	1	1	1	3
4	Venezuela	1	1	1	3
6	Egypt	1	0	1	2
6	Kazakhstan	1	0	1	2
6	Mexico	1	0	1	2
6	Russia	1	0	1	2
10	Aruba	1	0	0	1
10	Iraq	1	0	0	1
10	Moldova	1	0	0	1
10	Saudi Arabia	1	0	0	1
10	Tunisia	1	0	0	1
10	United States	1	0	0	1
16	Italy	0	1	1	2
17	Armenia	0	1	0	1
17	Libya	0	1	0	1
17	Romania	0	1	0	1
17	Spain	0	1	0	1
21	Colombia*	0	0	2	2
22	Chinese Taipei	0	0	1	1
22	Ecuador	0	0	1	1
22	Poland	0	0	1	1
22	Ukraine	0	0	1	1
Totals (25 entries)		16	16	16	48

Ranking by all medals: Big (Total result) and Small (Snatch and Clean & Jerk)

* Host nation (Colombia)

Rank	Nation	Gold	Silver	Bronze	Total
1	Georgia	5	2	7	14
2	Philippines	4	10	2	16
3	Turkey	4	9	3	16
4	Venezuela	4	2	4	10
5	Turkmenistan	4	2	1	7
6	Egypt	3	1	1	5
7	Aruba	3	0	0	3
7	Iraq	3	0	0	3
7	Moldova	3	0	0	3
7	United States	3	0	0	3
11	Russia	2	2	5	9
12	Kazakhstan	2	2	1	5
13	Mexico	2	1	4	7
14	Saudi Arabia	2	1	0	3
15	Tunisia	2	0	2	4
16	Spain	1	2	0	3
17	Ukraine	1	1	1	3
18	Italy	0	3	4	7
19	Romania	0	2	2	4
20	Armenia	0	2	0	2
20	Libya	0	2	0	2
22	Chinese Taipei	0	1	1	2
22	Ecuador	0	1	1	2
22	Poland	0	1	1	2
25	Greece	0	1	0	1
26	Colombia*	0	0	5	5
27	Belarus	0	0	2	2
28	Brazil	0	0	1	1
Totals (28 entries)		48	48	48	144

== Medalists ==
=== Men ===
Event	Gold		Silver		Bronze	
56 kg
Snatch	Mohammed Al-Ojaian (KSA)	114 kg YWR	Jay Colonia (PHI)	109 kg	Christian Di Maria (ITA)	108 kg
Clean & Jerk	Jay Colonia (PHI)	140 kg	Mohammed Al-Ojaian (KSA)	139 kg	Christian Di Maria (ITA)	130 kg
Total	Mohammed Al-Ojaian (KSA)	253 kg YWR	Jay Colonia (PHI)	249 kg	Christian Di Maria (ITA)	238 kg
60 kg
Snatch	Atabek Azamatow (TKM)	116 kg	Kirby Ken Alas-as (PHI)	113 kg	Evgenii Butuzov (RUS)	111 kg
Clean & Jerk	Víctor Méndez (MEX)	142 kg	Mustafa Hamza Ciğer (TUR)	140 kg	Evgenii Butuzov (RUS)	138 kg
Total	Víctor Méndez (MEX)	250 kg	Atabek Azamatow (TKM)	249 kg	Evgenii Butuzov (RUS)	249 kg
65 kg
Snatch	David Linares (VEN)	123 kg	Sergei Plotnikov (RUS)	122 kg	Giorgi Kinkladze (GEO)	120 kg
Clean & Jerk	Sergei Plotnikov (RUS)	153 kg	David Linares (VEN)	151 kg	Giorgi Kinkladze (GEO)	144 kg
Total	Sergei Plotnikov (RUS)	275 kg	David Linares (VEN)	274 kg	Giorgi Kinkladze (GEO)	264 kg
71 kg
Snatch	Toprak Köleoğlu (TUR)	128 kg	Panagiotis Spyrou (GRE)	127 kg	Davit Kiladze (GEO)	126 kg
Clean & Jerk	Davit Kiladze (GEO)	153 kg	Nikolai Ratnieks (RUS)	152 kg	Kevin Campaz (COL)	150 kg
Total	Davit Kiladze (GEO)	279 kg	Toprak Köleoğlu (TUR)	278 kg	Kevin Campaz (COL)	273 kg
79 kg
Snatch	Ali Abdelradi (EGY)	143 kg	Yernur Myrzakhmet (KAZ)	142 kg	Yiğithan Eroğlu (TUR)	139 kg
Clean & Jerk	Ali Abdelradi (EGY)	175 kg	Abdulrauf Khalifa (LBA)	168 kg	Arsenii Kurochkin (RUS)	166 kg
Total	Ali Abdelradi (EGY)	318 kg	Abdulrauf Khalifa (LBA)	305 kg	Yernur Myrzakhmet (KAZ)	304 kg
88 kg
Snatch	Erik Guadamud (ESP)	156 kg	Nurzhan Zhumabay (KAZ)	155 kg	José Mantilla (MEX)	151 kg
Clean & Jerk	Nurzhan Zhumabay (KAZ)	193 kg YWR	Erik Guadamud (ESP)	188 kg	José Mantilla (MEX)	184 kg
Total	Nurzhan Zhumabay (KAZ)	348 kg	Erik Guadamud (ESP)	344 kg	José Mantilla (MEX)	335 kg
94 kg
Snatch	Mousa Qaiti (IRQ)	150 kg	Mykhailo Maliuk (UKR)	142 kg	Tamazi Megrelishvili (GEO)	141 kg
Clean & Jerk	Mousa Qaiti (IRQ)	182 kg	Alen Zurabyan (ARM)	180 kg	Tamazi Megrelishvili (GEO)	171 kg
Total	Mousa Qaiti (IRQ)	332 kg	Alen Zurabyan (ARM)	317 kg	Tamazi Megrelishvili (GEO)	312 kg
+94 kg
Snatch	Khvicha Kitsmaridze (GEO)	154 kg	Kacper Piech (POL)	153 kg	Semion Makarau (BLR)	151 kg
Clean & Jerk	Nikoloz Kurtanidze (GEO)	187 kg	Khvicha Kitsmaridze (GEO)	183 kg	Matvei Klimov (RUS)	181 kg
Total	Nikoloz Kurtanidze (GEO)	338 kg	Khvicha Kitsmaridze (GEO)	337 kg	Kacper Piech (POL)	333 kg

=== Women ===
Event	Gold		Silver		Bronze	
44 kg
Snatch	Aurora van Ulft (ARU)	69 kg	Asel Şenel (TUR)	66 kg	Mariana Asprilla (COL)	61 kg
Clean & Jerk	Aurora van Ulft (ARU)	93 kg YWR	Althea Bacaro (PHI)	80 kg	Asel Şenel (TUR)	77 kg
Total	Aurora van Ulft (ARU)	162 kg YWR	Asel Şenel (TUR)	143 kg	Althea Bacaro (PHI)	140 kg
48 kg
Snatch	Alexsandra Diaz (PHI)	77 kg	Adelina Lorinț (ROU)	74 kg	Maia Andrei (ROU)	73 kg
Clean & Jerk	Alexsandra Diaz (PHI)	98 kg YWR	Giovanna Ávila (MEX)	92 kg	Valeria Osorio (VEN)	91 kg
Total	Alexsandra Diaz (PHI)	175 kg YWR	Adelina Lorinț (ROU)	164 kg	Valeria Osorio (VEN)	162 kg
53 kg
Snatch	Ogulşat Amanowa (TKM)	86 kg	Jhodie Peralta (PHI)	85 kg	Arianye Echandía (VEN)	84 kg
Clean & Jerk	Ogulşat Amanowa (TKM)	105 kg	Şabnam Kerimbayewa (TKM)	105 kg	Arianye Echandía (VEN)	103 kg
Total	Ogulşat Amanowa (TKM)	191 kg	Jhodie Peralta (PHI)	188 kg	Şabnam Kerimbayewa (TKM)	188 kg
58 kg
Snatch	Nicoleta Cojocaru (MDA)	88 kg	Yasmine Abdalla (EGY)	86 kg	İlayda Ertuğrul (TUR)	85 kg
Clean & Jerk	Nicoleta Cojocaru (MDA)	114 kg YWR	İlayda Ertuğrul (TUR)	105 kg	Emily Kuster (BRA)	105 kg
Total	Nicoleta Cojocaru (MDA)	202 kg YWR	İlayda Ertuğrul (TUR)	190 kg	Yasmine Abdalla (EGY)	189 kg
63 kg
Snatch	Sudenaz Sevim (TUR)	87 kg	Zehranur Aslan (TUR)	86 kg	Stefany Higuita (COL)	85 kg
Clean & Jerk	Zehranur Aslan (TUR)	112 kg	Sudenaz Sevim (TUR)	110 kg	Uladzislava Lavar (BLR)	109 kg
Total	Zehranur Aslan (TUR)	198 kg	Sudenaz Sevim (TUR)	197 kg	Stefany Higuita (COL)	191 kg
69 kg
Snatch	Adelyn Jones (USA)	91 kg	Rhianne Cabalida (PHI)	88 kg	Edith Ríos (MEX)	86 kg
Clean & Jerk	Adelyn Jones (USA)	114 kg	Ilenia Vella (ITA)	106 kg	Rhianne Cabalida (PHI)	105 kg
Total	Adelyn Jones (USA)	205 kg	Rhianne Cabalida (PHI)	193 kg	Beyoncé Bolaños (ECU)	188 kg
77 kg
Snatch	Ghrissa Ghofrane (TUN)	90 kg	Iris Valencia (ECU)	89 kg	Flavia Hreapcă (ROU)	88 kg
Clean & Jerk	Polina Kalnyk (UKR)	112 kg	Jea Mae Palagtiw (PHI)	112 kg	Ghrissa Ghofrane (TUN)	110 kg
Total	Ghrissa Ghofrane (TUN)	200 kg	Jea Mae Palagtiw (PHI)	200 kg	Polina Kalnyk (UKR)	199 kg
+77 kg
Snatch	Lidysmar Aparicio (VEN)	110 kg	Sara Dal Bò (ITA)	102 kg	Hiba Tbini (TUN)	101 kg
Clean & Jerk	Lidysmar Aparicio (VEN)	140 kg	Su Sheng-ci (TPE)	130 kg	Sara Dal Bò (ITA)	128 kg
Total	Lidysmar Aparicio (VEN)	250 kg	Sara Dal Bò (ITA)	230 kg	Su Sheng-ci (TPE)	225 kg

== Team ranking ==
Men

Rank	Team	Points
1	Russia	513
2	Mexico	461
3	Georgia	434
4	Colombia	425
5	United States	264
6	Turkmenistan	249

Women

Rank	Team	Points
1	Mexico	451
2	Colombia	413
3	Russia	404
4	Philippines	371
5	Turkey	369
6	United States	325

== Men's results ==
=== 56 kg ===
Rank	Name	Group	Snatch					Clean & Jerk					Total
Rank	Name	Group	1	2	3	Result	Rank	1	2	3	Result	Rank	Result
1st place, gold medalist(s)	Mohammed Al-Ojaian (KSA)	A	107	111	114	114 YWR	1st place, gold medalist(s)	134	139	~~139~~	139	2nd place, silver medalist(s)	253 YWR
2nd place, silver medalist(s)	Jay Colonia (PHI)	A	105	109	~~112~~	109	2nd place, silver medalist(s)	135	140	~~145~~	140	1st place, gold medalist(s)	249
3rd place, bronze medalist(s)	Christian Di Maria (ITA)	A	108	~~112~~	~~115~~	108	3rd place, bronze medalist(s)	130	136	~~139~~	136	3rd place, bronze medalist(s)	244
4	Oleksandr Fiialko (UKR)	A	89	92	95	95	4	111	116	~~120~~	116	6	211
5	Diego Yoo (USA)	A	85	88	~~91~~	88	6	113	117	~~120~~	120	5	208
6	Francisco Carvajal (MEX)	A	83	~~86~~	~~86~~	83	8	116	120	~~123~~	123	4	206
7	Jared De la Rosa (MEX)	A	87	90	93	93	5	~~108~~	108	112	112	7	205
8	Ismael Vélez (COL)	A	83	~~87~~	~~88~~	83	7	105	~~112~~	~~112~~	105	8	188
9	Stephano Yeogusuku (PER)	A	~~80~~	~~80~~	80	80	9	99	102	~~102~~	102	9	182

=== 60 kg ===
Rank	Name	Group	Snatch					Clean & Jerk					Total
Rank	Name	Group	1	2	3	Result	Rank	1	2	3	Result	Rank	Result
1st place, gold medalist(s)	Víctor Méndez (MEX)	A	103	108	~~111~~	108	5	135	139	142	142	1st place, gold medalist(s)	250
2nd place, silver medalist(s)	Atabek Azamatow (TKM)	A	110	114	116	116	1st place, gold medalist(s)	128	~~132~~	133	133	6	249
3rd place, bronze medalist(s)	Evgenii Butuzov (RUS)	A	108	~~111~~	111	111	3rd place, bronze medalist(s)	132	138	~~139~~	138	3rd place, bronze medalist(s)	249
4	Kirby Kent Alasas (PHI)	A	110	113	~~115~~	113	2nd place, silver medalist(s)	~~135~~	~~135~~	135	135	5	248
5	Yahea Alsebaai (CAN)	A	105	109	~~111~~	109	4	131	136	~~140~~	136	4	245
6	Mustafa Ciğer (TUR)	A	~~105~~	105	~~109~~	105	7	~~136~~	137	140	140	2nd place, silver medalist(s)	245
7	Kerem Gurbandurdyýew (TKM)	A	107	~~110~~	~~110~~	107	6	125	130	~~135~~	130	7	237
8	Ei Roy Martínez (VEN)	A	102	~~106~~	~~106~~	102	8	121	126	~~132~~	126	8	228
9	Adam Lipiński (POL)	A	90	~~93~~	93	93	12	116	123	126	126	9	219
10	Florin Ispilante (ROU)	A	94	~~98~~	98	98	9	~~117~~	~~117~~	117	117	11	215
11	Anderson Aparicio (COL)	A	90	95	~~97~~	95	11	115	120	~~124~~	120	10	215
12	Abdullah Zubaidi (KSA)	A	88	92	96	96	10	105	111	~~116~~	111	13	207
13	Andrew Weymer (USA)	A	92	~~94~~	~~95~~	92	13	106	109	112	112	12	204

=== 65 kg ===
Rank	Name	Group	Snatch					Clean & Jerk					Total
Rank	Name	Group	1	2	3	Result	Rank	1	2	3	Result	Rank	Result
1st place, gold medalist(s)	Sergei Plotnikov (RUS)	A	116	119	122	122	2nd place, silver medalist(s)	142	150	153	153	1st place, gold medalist(s)	275
2nd place, silver medalist(s)	David Linares (VEN)	A	118	121	123	123	1st place, gold medalist(s)	143	~~150~~	151	151	2nd place, silver medalist(s)	274
3rd place, bronze medalist(s)	Giorgi Kinkladze (GEO)	A	112	116	120	120	3rd place, bronze medalist(s)	135	139	144	144	3rd place, bronze medalist(s)	264
4	Shahin Hudaybergenov (TKM)	A	~~115~~	115	118	118	5	138	~~142~~	143	143	4	261
5	Viktar Shchohaleu (BLR)	A	105	109	112	112	6	~~129~~	129	134	134	5	246
6	Juan Ramírez (COL)	A	106	110	~~113~~	110	7	~~130~~	~~130~~	130	130	8	240
7	Roberto Ciurar (ROU)	A	105	~~110~~	~~111~~	105	9	125	128	131	131	6	236
8	Daniel Cuellar (ESA)	A	95	102	102	102	10	123	126	126	126	9	228
9	Nathan Mifsud (MLT)	A	100	103	106	106	8	121	125	~~126~~	121	11	227
10	Quan Zheng-san (TPE)	A	95	100	~~102~~	95	13	125	130	~~134~~	130	7	225
11	Joshua Zacarías (MEX)	A	98	101	~~103~~	101	11	123	127	~~128~~	123	10	224
12	Samuel Geringer (SUI)	A	~~96~~	96	~~103~~	96	12	117	117	123	117	12	213
13	Sergio Ortega (GUA)	A	93	98	98	93	14	110	115	~~120~~	115	13	208
—	Sadek Mahmoud (EGY)	A	115	118	~~121~~	118	4	—	—	—	—	—	—

=== 71 kg ===
Rank	Name	Group	Snatch					Clean & Jerk					Total
Rank	Name	Group	1	2	3	Result	Rank	1	2	3	Result	Rank	Result
1st place, gold medalist(s)	Davit Kiladze (GEO)	A	117	121	126	126	3rd place, bronze medalist(s)	149	153	—	153	1st place, gold medalist(s)	279
2nd place, silver medalist(s)	Toprak Köleoğlu (TUR)	A	125	128	~~130~~	128	1st place, gold medalist(s)	~~148~~	~~149~~	150	150	4	278
3rd place, bronze medalist(s)	Kevin Campaz (COL)	A	120	123	~~126~~	123	4	145	150	~~156~~	150	3rd place, bronze medalist(s)	273
4	Panagiotis Spyrou (GRE)	A	120	124	127	127	2nd place, silver medalist(s)	145	~~150~~	~~151~~	145	8	272
5	Oskar Leśniewski (POL)	A	115	~~119~~	119	119	7	140	~~146~~	146	146	5	265
6	Osneiber Pirona (VEN)	A	~~119~~	119	~~122~~	119	6	145	~~151~~	~~151~~	145	7	264
7	Viktor Kostadinov (BUL)	A	115	~~118~~	118	118	8	145	~~150~~	~~152~~	145	6	263
8	Oskar Wójcik (POL)	A	113	116	120	120	5	135	141	~~145~~	141	10	261
9	Nikolai Ratnieks (RUS)	A	105	~~110~~	~~110~~	105	10	147	~~152~~	152	152	2nd place, silver medalist(s)	257
10	Desmond Myles (USA)	A	105	109	~~113~~	109	9	133	138	143	143	9	252
11	Yerick Flores (GUA)	A	100	105	~~110~~	105	11	120	130	~~135~~	130	11	235

=== 79 kg ===
Rank	Name	Group	Snatch					Clean & Jerk					Total
Rank	Name	Group	1	2	3	Result	Rank	1	2	3	Result	Rank	Result
1st place, gold medalist(s)	Mohamed Abdelradi (EGY)	A	138	141	143	143	1st place, gold medalist(s)	167	~~175~~	175	175	1st place, gold medalist(s)	318
2nd place, silver medalist(s)	Abdulrauf Khalifa (LBA)	A	~~135~~	137	~~141~~	137	4	160	~~164~~	168	168	2nd place, silver medalist(s)	305
3rd place, bronze medalist(s)	Yernur Myrzakhmet (KAZ)	A	136	140	142	142	2nd place, silver medalist(s)	~~161~~	~~162~~	162	162	7	304
4	Yiğithan Eroğlu (TUR)	A	136	139	~~142~~	139	3rd place, bronze medalist(s)	163	~~166~~	~~166~~	163	5	302
5	Harutyun Avetisyan (ARM)	A	135	~~140~~	~~141~~	135	6	161	166	~~171~~	166	4	301
6	Antonino Mullisi (ALB)	A	132	135	137	137	5	161	163	~~165~~	163	6	300
7	Arsenii Kurochkin (RUS)	A	128	131	~~134~~	131	7	166	~~174~~	~~174~~	166	3rd place, bronze medalist(s)	297
8	Davut Kakageldiyew (TKM)	A	~~125~~	~~125~~	128	128	9	155	~~160~~	161	161	8	289
9	Kevin Mosquera (COL)	B	123	126	130	130	8	140	~~145~~	~~145~~	140	12	270
10	Anggello Bueno (COL)	B	115	120	124	124	10	145	~~150~~	~~150~~	145	9	269
11	Héctor Rodríguez (MEX)	B	113	117	121	121	12	~~145~~	145	~~150~~	145	10	266
12	Axel Jovel (ESA)	B	115	121	~~125~~	121	11	140	~~145~~	145	145	11	266
13	Ángel Picart (PUR)	B	~~110~~	~~110~~	110	110	13	133	140	~~146~~	140	13	250
14	Adrián Tripul (PER)	B	100	103	~~106~~	103	14	125	129	~~132~~	129	14	232
15	Andry Orozco (NCA)	B	95	100	~~102~~	100	15	~~120~~	120	125	125	15	225

=== 88 kg ===
Rank	Name	Group	Snatch					Clean & Jerk					Total
Rank	Name	Group	1	2	3	Result	Rank	1	2	3	Result	Rank	Result
1st place, gold medalist(s)	Nurzhan Zhumabay (KAZ)	A	150	~~155~~	155	155	2nd place, silver medalist(s)	185	193	~~200~~	193 YWR	1st place, gold medalist(s)	348
2nd place, silver medalist(s)	Erik Guadamud (ESP)	A	151	156	~~161~~	156	1st place, gold medalist(s)	183	188	~~194~~	188	2nd place, silver medalist(s)	344
3rd place, bronze medalist(s)	José Mantilla (MEX)	A	~~143~~	143	151	151	3rd place, bronze medalist(s)	175	184	~~190~~	184	3rd place, bronze medalist(s)	335
4	Mohammed Al-Bakhnasi (LBA)	A	134	139	141	141	4	166	~~171~~	172	172	4	313
5	Lado Dzimtseishvili (GEO)	A	130	134	~~140~~	134	6	165	~~173~~	~~176~~	165	6	299
6	Isaac Correa (BRA)	A	127	~~132~~	~~134~~	127	8	159	~~164~~	164	164	7	291
7	Aleksandr Shmarin (RUS)	A	135	~~139~~	~~140~~	135	5	155	~~160~~	~~160~~	155	9	290
8	Robert Whitlock (USA)	B	~~125~~	125	130	130	7	~~155~~	~~155~~	155	155	8	285
9	Kevin Valencia (COL)	B	~~120~~	120	125	125	9	140	145	~~150~~	145	11	270
10	Henry López (MEX)	B	~~115~~	115	~~122~~	115	11	~~147~~	147	152	152	10	267
11	Agoney Rodríguez (ESP)	B	110	114	116	116	10	140	~~145~~	~~145~~	140	12	256
12	Dylan Palou (PUR)	B	105	111	115	115	12	126	131	135	135	13	250
13	Ali Al-Sadah (KSA)	B	109	113	—	113	13	131	—	—	131	14	244
14	David Herrera (ESA)	B	106	110	~~115~~	110	14	130	~~135~~	~~136~~	130	15	240
—	Matías Moreno (CHI)	A	~~139~~	~~139~~	~~139~~	—	—	~~171~~	~~172~~	172	172	5	—

=== 94 kg ===
Rank	Name	Group	Snatch					Clean & Jerk					Total
Rank	Name	Group	1	2	3	Result	Rank	1	2	3	Result	Rank	Result
1st place, gold medalist(s)	Mousa Qaiti (IRQ)	A	143	147	105	150	1st place, gold medalist(s)	176	~~182~~	182	182	1st place, gold medalist(s)	332
2nd place, silver medalist(s)	Alen Zurabyan (ARM)	A	130	134	137	137	4	166	176	180	180	2nd place, silver medalist(s)	317
3rd place, bronze medalist(s)	Tamazi Megrelishvili (GEO)	A	135	138	141	141	3rd place, bronze medalist(s)	163	167	171	171	3rd place, bronze medalist(s)	312
4	Mykhailo Maliuk (UKR)	A	137	140	142	142	2nd place, silver medalist(s)	151	156	160	160	8	302
5	Artem Prokopenko (RUS)	A	~~122~~	122	127	127	7	159	164	169	169	5	296
6	Stanislav Archimaev (RUS)	A	127	131	133	133	5	157	162	~~165~~	162	6	295
7	Alan Braulio (ECU)	A	125	130	~~135~~	130	6	155	160	~~163~~	160	7	290
8	Baron Baker (USA)	A	120	~~125~~	~~125~~	120	9	160	~~165~~	170	170	4	290
9	Luis Ortiz (COL)	A	~~125~~	~~125~~	125	125	8	~~150~~	150	155	155	9	280
10	Laionel Ramos (PER)	A	105	110	~~115~~	110	10	131	~~136~~	~~136~~	131	10	241
11	Oto de la Cruz (GUA)	A	100	~~105~~	~~105~~	100	11	125	130	~~136~~	130	11	230
12	Claude Iowane (FIJ)	A	80	86	91	91	12	115	120	~~123~~	120	12	211

=== +94 kg ===
Rank	Name	Group	Snatch					Clean & Jerk					Total
Rank	Name	Group	1	2	3	Result	Rank	1	2	3	Result	Rank	Result
1st place, gold medalist(s)	Nikoloz Kurtanidze (GEO)	A	144	148	151	151	4	175	180	187	187	1st place, gold medalist(s)	338
2nd place, silver medalist(s)	Khvicha Kitsmaridze (GEO)	A	146	151	154	154	1st place, gold medalist(s)	174	178	183	183	2nd place, silver medalist(s)	337
3rd place, bronze medalist(s)	Kacper Piech (POL)	A	145	150	153	153	2nd place, silver medalist(s)	170	176	180	180	4	333
4	Semion Makarau (BLR)	A	142	147	151	151	3rd place, bronze medalist(s)	170	~~179~~	179	179	5	330
5	Matvei Klimov (RUS)	A	139	143	146	146	5	172	178	181	181	3rd place, bronze medalist(s)	327
6	Pedro Jaras (MEX)	A	115	120	~~125~~	120	8	160	165	171	171	6	291
7	Carlos Magallón (ESP)	A	120	125	130	130	6	149	155	160	160	7	290
8	Adrián Franco (ESP)	A	124	~~128~~	~~128~~	124	7	140	~~145~~	~~145~~	140	8	264
9	Miguel Florián (PER)	A	110	115	120	120	9	~~138~~	138	~~142~~	138	9	258
10	Héctor Pérez (PUR)	A	~~100~~	100	~~110~~	100	10	~~110~~	~~110~~	110	110	10	210

== Women's results ==
=== 44 kg ===
Rank	Name	Group	Snatch					Clean & Jerk					Total
Rank	Name	Group	1	2	3	Result	Rank	1	2	3	Result	Rank	Result
1st place, gold medalist(s)	Aurora Van Ulft (ARU)	A	67	~~69~~	69	69	1st place, gold medalist(s)	88	93	~~95~~	93 YWR	1st place, gold medalist(s)	162 YWR
2nd place, silver medalist(s)	Asel Şenel (TUR)	A	64	~~66~~	66	66	2nd place, silver medalist(s)	77	~~79~~	~~81~~	77	3rd place, bronze medalist(s)	143
3rd place, bronze medalist(s)	Althea Bacaro (PHI)	A	~~60~~	60	~~63~~	60	4	77	79	80	80	2nd place, silver medalist(s)	140
4	Mariana Asprilla (COL)	A	58	61	~~63~~	61	3rd place, bronze medalist(s)	~~70~~	70	75	75	5	136
5	Emilia Araos (CHI)	A	59	~~62~~	~~62~~	59	5	72	74	~~77~~	74	6	133
6	Gisela Ruano (ESP)	A	52	55	~~57~~	55	8	73	76	~~78~~	76	4	131
7	Ximena Carrillo (MEX)	A	52	54	56	56	7	67	70	~~73~~	70	8	126
8	Estefany Montejano (MEX)	A	~~50~~	50	53	53	9	70	73	~~75~~	73	7	126
9	Katerin Sotomayor (GUA)	A	52	56	~~58~~	56	6	~~67~~	67	70	67	9	123

=== 48 kg ===
Rank	Name	Group	Snatch					Clean & Jerk					Total
Rank	Name	Group	1	2	3	Result	Rank	1	2	3	Result	Rank	Result
1st place, gold medalist(s)	Alexsandra Diaz (PHI)	A	73	75	77	77	1st place, gold medalist(s)	92	98	~~100~~	98 YWR	1st place, gold medalist(s)	175 YWR
2nd place, silver medalist(s)	Adelina Lorinț (ROU)	A	70	72	74	74	2nd place, silver medalist(s)	~~88~~	88	90	90	4	164
3rd place, bronze medalist(s)	Valeria Del Valle (VEN)	A	~~71~~	~~71~~	71	71	4	88	91	~~94~~	91	3rd place, bronze medalist(s)	162
4	Maia Andrei (ROU)	A	70	~~73~~	73	73	3rd place, bronze medalist(s)	85	88	~~92~~	88	5	161
5	Giovanna Ávila (MEX)	A	~~68~~	68	~~71~~	68	7	88	~~91~~	92	92	2nd place, silver medalist(s)	160
6	Thaira Realpe (ECU)	A	68	~~70~~	~~70~~	68	6	83	85	~~89~~	85	7	153
7	Jaedyn Orton (USA)	A	~~67~~	67	~~71~~	67	8	85	~~89~~	~~89~~	85	6	152
8	Ivy Buzinhani (CAN)	A	67	69	~~71~~	69	5	81	~~84~~	~~85~~	81	10	150
9	Chiang Yu-ti (TPE)	A	53	~~58~~	59	59	9	75	80	82	82	9	141
10	Huang Pei-huan (TPE)	A	58	~~61~~	~~61~~	58	10	79	82	~~85~~	82	8	140
11	Adyelis Colón (PUR)	A	46	50	53	53	11	57	61	~~64~~	61	11	114

=== 53 kg ===
Rank	Name	Group	Snatch					Clean & Jerk					Total
Rank	Name	Group	1	2	3	Result	Rank	1	2	3	Result	Rank	Result
1st place, gold medalist(s)	Oguşat Amanowa (TKM)	A	83	86	~~88~~	86	1st place, gold medalist(s)	99	103	105	105	1st place, gold medalist(s)	191
2nd place, silver medalist(s)	Jhodie Peralta (PHI)	A	83	85	~~87~~	85	2nd place, silver medalist(s)	101	103	~~105~~	103	4	188
3rd place, bronze medalist(s)	Şebnem Kerimbaýewa (TKM)	A	78	81	83	83	5	~~104~~	~~105~~	105	105	2nd place, silver medalist(s)	188
4	Arianye Echandia (VEN)	A	82	~~84~~	84	84	3rd place, bronze medalist(s)	103	~~106~~	~~108~~	103	3rd place, bronze medalist(s)	187
5	Alexia Sipoș (ROU)	A	77	81	83	83	4	93	~~96~~	~~96~~	93	7	176
6	Basma Gunaidy (EGY)	A	79	~~82~~	~~82~~	79	7	95	~~103~~	~~103~~	95	5	174
7	Luz Solís (COL)	A	73	~~76~~	~~76~~	73	8	90	94	~~97~~	94	6	167
8	Romina Nava (MEX)	A	67	70	72	72	9	88	91	93	93	8	165
9	Gabriela Danilov (MDA)	A	~~71~~	71	~~74~~	71	11	84	87	91	91	9	162
10	Kimberly Pérez (MEX)	A	66	~~69~~	69	69	12	87	90	~~93~~	90	10	159
11	Evelyn Gómez (ESP)	A	68	71	~~74~~	71	10	80	~~83~~	84	84	11	155
12	Amelia Phillips (USA)	A	62	~~65~~	65	65	13	80	~~83~~	~~84~~	80	12	145
13	Selly Vásquez (PER)	A	57	60	62	62	14	74	78	~~81~~	78	13	140
—	Lorith Paternina (COL)	A	76	80	~~83~~	80	6	~~92~~	~~92~~	~~92~~	—	—	—

=== 58 kg ===
Rank	Name	Group	Snatch					Clean & Jerk					Total
Rank	Name	Group	1	2	3	Result	Rank	1	2	3	Result	Rank	Result
1st place, gold medalist(s)	Nicoleta Cojocaru (MDA)	A	85	88	~~92~~	88	1st place, gold medalist(s)	105	109	114	114	1st place, gold medalist(s)	202
2nd place, silver medalist(s)	İlayda Ertuğrul (TUR)	A	80	83	85	85	3rd place, bronze medalist(s)	~~104~~	105	~~110~~	105	2nd place, silver medalist(s)	190
3rd place, bronze medalist(s)	Yasmine Mohamed (EGY)	A	82	~~86~~	86	86	2nd place, silver medalist(s)	103	~~108~~	~~108~~	103	5	189
4	Nursuila Berikbol (KAZ)	A	77	~~80~~	81	81	5	100	104	~~109~~	104	4	185
5	Eleonora Gasieva (RUS)	B	74	77	80	80	6	94	97	100	100	6	180
6	Emily Kuster (BRA)	A	75	~~80~~	~~80~~	75	10	97	101	105	105	3rd place, bronze medalist(s)	180
7	Laura Rivas (COL)	A	75	79	~~81~~	79	8	95	99	~~102~~	99	7	178
8	Laura Romeiro (BRA)	A	80	82	~~84~~	82	4	92	95	~~98~~	95	9	177
9	Pinja Eskelinen (FIN)	B	70	73	76	76	9	87	90	92	92	10	168
10	Yelena Restrepo (COL)	B	71	~~74~~	~~74~~	71	13	90	93	96	96	8	167
11	Inés Conde (ESP)	B	~~74~~	74	~~78~~	74	11	~~91~~	91	~~95~~	91	11	165
12	Lide Mendizabal (ESP)	B	~~70~~	70	73	73	12	~~90~~	~~90~~	90	90	12	163
13	Gülzada Berdimuhammedowa (TKM)	B	63	66	68	68	14	84	88	~~90~~	88	13	156
—	Viktoriia Fedchenko (UKR)	A	~~80~~	~~80~~	80	80	7	~~93~~	~~93~~	~~93~~	—	—	—

=== 63 kg ===
Rank	Name	Group	Snatch					Clean & Jerk					Total
Rank	Name	Group	1	2	3	Result	Rank	1	2	3	Result	Rank	Result
1st place, gold medalist(s)	Zehranur Aslan (TUR)	A	~~83~~	84	86	86	2nd place, silver medalist(s)	~~108~~	109	112	112	1st place, gold medalist(s)	198
2nd place, silver medalist(s)	Sudenaz Sevim (TUR)	A	83	~~85~~	87	87	1st place, gold medalist(s)	~~107~~	107	110	110	2nd place, silver medalist(s)	197
3rd place, bronze medalist(s)	Stefany Higuita (COL)	A	81	84	85	85	3rd place, bronze medalist(s)	103	106	~~108~~	106	4	191
4	Marely Lara (ECU)	A	79	83	~~85~~	83	5	100	104	~~108~~	104	6	187
5	Uladzislava Lavar (BLR)	A	78	~~81~~	~~81~~	78	9	100	105	109	109	3rd place, bronze medalist(s)	187
6	Mariana Sánchez (MEX)	A	78	~~82~~	~~83~~	78	8	103	106	~~110~~	106	5	184
7	Aisylu Nigmatzianova (RUS)	B	80	84	~~86~~	84	4	92	96	~~100~~	96	10	180
8	Xiomara Zapata (COL)	A	75	~~80~~	80	80	7	90	98	~~101~~	98	8	178
9	Eleonore Broers (BEL)	B	76	79	81	81	6	92	95	~~97~~	95	12	176
10	Mereia Turaganivalu (FIJ)	B	70	75	77	77	10	91	95	97	97	9	174
11	Linda Svrčková (SVK)	B	71	74	~~76~~	74	11	91	95	~~97~~	95	11	169
12	Jhuang Jia-sin (TPE)	B	70	73	~~75~~	73	12	85	90	~~93~~	90	13	163
13	Alanis Sánchez (PUR)	B	48	~~53~~	53	53	13	62	66	70	70	14	123
—	Keilana Brewer (USA)	A	—	—	—	—	—	—	—	—	—	—	—
—	Chassity Del Balso (USA)	A	~~77~~	~~78~~	~~78~~	—	—	~~102~~	102	~~109~~	102	7	—

=== 69 kg ===
Rank	Name	Group	Snatch					Clean & Jerk					Total
Rank	Name	Group	1	2	3	Result	Rank	1	2	3	Result	Rank	Result
1st place, gold medalist(s)	Adelyn Jones (USA)	A	86	89	91	91	1st place, gold medalist(s)	106	110	114	114	1st place, gold medalist(s)	205
2nd place, silver medalist(s)	Rhianne Cabalida (PHI)	B	85	88	~~90~~	88	2nd place, silver medalist(s)	105	~~108~~	~~108~~	105	3rd place, bronze medalist(s)	193
3rd place, bronze medalist(s)	Beyoncé Bolaños (ECU)	B	~~80~~	80	83	83	5	100	103	105	105	4	188
4	Ilenia Vella (ITA)	A	~~81~~	81	~~86~~	81	9	98	~~102~~	106	106	2nd place, silver medalist(s)	187
5	Aleksandra Wachna (POL)	B	81	~~85~~	85	85	4	96	~~100~~	101	101	6	186
6	Edith Ríos (MEX)	A	~~83~~	84	86	86	3rd place, bronze medalist(s)	93	~~98~~	98	98	10	184
7	Alicja Szaruga (POL)	A	81	~~85~~	~~86~~	81	7	103	~~108~~	~~108~~	103	5	184
8	Anhelina Selivanova (UKR)	A	80	~~82~~	82	82	6	100	~~104~~	~~106~~	100	8	182
9	Gianna Van Hofwegen (USA)	A	81	~~84~~	~~84~~	81	8	101	~~106~~	~~107~~	101	7	182
10	Andrea Traña (NCA)	B	~~80~~	~~80~~	80	80	10	90	95	~~97~~	95	11	175
11	Margarita Bondarenko (RUS)	B	75	~~78~~	78	78	11	90	~~95~~	95	95	12	173
12	Mariana Achury (COL)	B	72	~~76~~	~~76~~	72	13	93	96	98	98	9	170
13	Aleksandra Lysenkova (RUS)	B	~~75~~	75	~~79~~	75	12	92	~~97~~	~~97~~	92	14	167
14	Abril Gamarra (PER)	B	~~72~~	72	~~75~~	72	14	~~94~~	~~94~~	94	94	13	166

=== 77 kg ===
Rank	Name	Group	Snatch					Clean & Jerk					Total
Rank	Name	Group	1	2	3	Result	Rank	1	2	3	Result	Rank	Result
1st place, gold medalist(s)	Ghofrane Ghrissa (TUN)	A	83	87	90	90	1st place, gold medalist(s)	~~106~~	107	110	110	3rd place, bronze medalist(s)	200
2nd place, silver medalist(s)	Jea Mae Palagtiw (PHI)	A	85	88	~~90~~	88	4	107	110	112	112	2nd place, silver medalist(s)	200
3rd place, bronze medalist(s)	Polina Kalnyk (UKR)	A	85	~~87~~	87	87	5	109	112	~~114~~	112	1st place, gold medalist(s)	199
4	Iris Valencia (ECU)	A	~~85~~	86	89	89	2nd place, silver medalist(s)	105	109	~~111~~	109	4	198
5	Flavia Hreapcă (ROU)	A	85	88	~~91~~	88	3rd place, bronze medalist(s)	105	~~109~~	~~110~~	105	7	193
6	Ke Han-yun (TPE)	A	~~83~~	83	85	85	7	104	107	~~110~~	107	5	192
7	Rebeca Ramírez (MEX)	A	85	~~88~~	~~89~~	85	6	106	~~110~~	~~111~~	106	6	191
8	Aleksandra Ponomarenko (RUS)	A	77	80	82	82	9	~~97~~	97	103	103	8	185
9	Uliana Nazarenko (UKR)	A	83	~~86~~	~~86~~	83	8	~~98~~	98	101	101	9	184
10	Sabira Bortnikova (RUS)	A	~~75~~	75	~~78~~	75	10	90	~~94~~	~~94~~	90	10	165

=== +77 kg ===
Rank	Name	Group	Snatch					Clean & Jerk					Total
Rank	Name	Group	1	2	3	Result	Rank	1	2	3	Result	Rank	Result
1st place, gold medalist(s)	Aparicio Lidysmar (VEN)	A	103	107	110	110	1st place, gold medalist(s)	135	140	~~143~~	140	1st place, gold medalist(s)	250
2nd place, silver medalist(s)	Sara Dal Bò (ITA)	A	~~100~~	102	~~108~~	102	2nd place, silver medalist(s)	123	128	~~131~~	128	3rd place, bronze medalist(s)	230
3rd place, bronze medalist(s)	Su Sheng-ci (TPE)	A	90	93	95	95	9	123	127	130	130	2nd place, silver medalist(s)	225
4	Hiba Allah Tbini (TUN)	A	94	98	101	101	3rd place, bronze medalist(s)	115	120	123	123	4	224
5	Anika Falasia (NZL)	A	99	~~102~~	~~102~~	99	4	117	122	~~126~~	122	5	221
6	Snizhana Melnyk (UKR)	A	95	98	98	98	5	115	118	121	121	6	219
7	Thaira Castro (ECU)	A	95	95	100	95	8	115	120	~~123~~	120	7	215
8	Palina Novikava (BLR)	A	90	95	95	95	10	113	118	~~122~~	118	8	213
9	Sudenaz Yılmaz (TUR)	A	96	~~100~~	~~100~~	96	6	111	116	~~121~~	116	9	212
10	Dorota Gnoza (POL)	A	90	95	~~98~~	95	7	112	116	~~118~~	116	10	211
11	Alena Kozlova (RUS)	B	90	90	94	94	11	110	115	~~118~~	115	11	209
12	Daria Rei (RUS)	A	87	92	95	92	12	107	112	115	115	12	207
13	Giulliana Navarro (CHI)	B	88	88	88	88	13	105	110	113	113	13	201
14	Chaimae Rahmouni (MAR)	B	81	84	~~87~~	84	14	103	~~108~~	~~110~~	103	14	187
15	Sofiia Kozak (UKR)	B	78	81	83	83	15	98	102	~~106~~	102	15	185
16	Katarzyna Kozera (POL)	B	77	80	~~82~~	80	16	98	101	104	104	13	184
17	Marta García (ESP)	B	76	79	~~81~~	79	17	94	98	~~101~~	98	16	177
18	Iva Milić (CRO)	B	70	73	75	75	18	90	94	~~97~~	94	17	169
—	Nadia Caraballo (VEN)	B	80	~~84~~	~~84~~	80	19	~~105~~	~~105~~	~~105~~	—	—	—
