= Youth World Weightlifting Championships =

Youth weightlifting championships

IWF Youth World Championships
- Status: active
- Genre: sporting event
- Date: mid-year
- Frequency: biennial
- Country: varying
- Inaugurated: 2009
- Organiser: IWF

The IWF Youth World Championships is organised by the International Weightlifting Federation (IWF). The first competition was held in May 2009.

In 2010, 2014 and 2018, the championship was not held due to the Youth Olympic Games.

== Editions ==
https://intersportstats.com/competition_types/548

Edition	Year	Venue	Events
1	2009	Chiangmai, Thailand	45
2	2011	Lima, Peru	45
3	2012	Kosice, Slovakia	45
4	2013	Tashkent, Uzbekistan	45
5	2015	Lima, Peru	45
6	2016	Penang, Malaysia	45
7	2017	Bangkok, Thailand	48
8	2019	Las Vegas, United States	60
9	2021	Jeddah, Saudi Arabia	60
10	2022	León, Mexico	60
11	2023	Durrës, Albania	60
12	2024	Lima, Peru	60
13	2025	Lima, Peru	60
14	2026	Cali, Colombia	48
