= List of junior Iranian records in Olympic weightlifting =

The following are the national junior records in Olympic weightlifting in Iran. Records are maintained in each weight class for the snatch lift, clean and jerk lift, and the total for both lifts by the Iran Weightlifting Federation.

== Current records ==
=== Men ===
Event	Record	Athlete	Date	Meet	Place	Age	Ref/Note
55 kg
Snatch	92 kg	Matin Mohammadi	6 October 2021	World Youth Championships	Jeddah, Saudi Arabia	17 years, 173 days	
Clean & Jerk	110 kg	Matin Mohammadi	6 October 2021	World Youth Championships	Jeddah, Saudi Arabia	17 years, 173 days	
Total	202 kg	Matin Mohammadi	6 October 2021	World Youth Championships	Jeddah, Saudi Arabia	17 years, 173 days	
61 kg
Snatch	113 kg	Hossein Najafi	2 June 2019	Junior World Championships	Suva, Fiji	18 years, 169 days	
Clean & Jerk	136 kg	Hossein Najafi	2 June 2019	Junior World Championships	Suva, Fiji	18 years, 169 days	
Total	249 kg	Hossein Najafi	2 June 2019	Junior World Championships	Suva, Fiji	18 years, 169 days	
67 kg
Snatch							
Clean & Jerk	130 kg	Iliya Salehipour	7 October 2021	World Youth Championships	Jeddah, Saudi Arabia	14 years, 308 days	
Total							
73 kg
Snatch	146 kg	Hossein Soltani	4 November 2018	World Championships	Ashgabat, Turkmenistan	18 years, 337 days	
Clean & Jerk	174 kg	Hossein Soltani	4 November 2018	World Championships	Ashgabat, Turkmenistan	18 years, 337 days	
Total	320 kg	Hossein Soltani	4 November 2018	World Championships	Ashgabat, Turkmenistan	18 years, 337 days	
81 kg
Snatch	154 kg	Mir Mostafa Javadi	23 April 2019	Asian Championships	Ningbo, China	18 years, 305 days	
Clean & Jerk	191 kg	Hossein Soltani	4 June 2019	Junior World Championships	Suva, Fiji	19 years, 184 days	
Total	345 kg	Hossein Soltani	4 June 2019	Junior World Championships	Suva, Fiji	19 years, 184 days	
89 kg
Snatch	158 kg	Aref Khaki	6 November 2018	World Championships	Ashgabat, Turkmenistan	19 years, 317 days	
Clean & Jerk	195 kg	Aref Khaki	6 November 2018	World Championships	Ashgabat, Turkmenistan	19 years, 317 days	
Total	353 kg	Aref Khaki	6 November 2018	World Championships	Ashgabat, Turkmenistan	19 years, 317 days	
96 kg
Snatch	161 kg	Afshin Taheri	5 June 2019	Junior World Championships	Suva, Fiji	19 years, 88 days	
Clean & Jerk	180 kg	Afshin Taheri	5 June 2019	Junior World Championships	Suva, Fiji	19 years, 88 days	
Total	341 kg	Afshin Taheri	5 June 2019	Junior World Championships	Suva, Fiji	19 years, 88 days	
102 kg
Snatch	165 kg	Amir Azizi	6 June 2019	Junior World Championships	Suva, Fiji	20 years, 148 days	
Clean & Jerk	195 kg	Amir Azizi	6 June 2019	Junior World Championships	Suva, Fiji	20 years, 148 days	
Total	360 kg	Amir Azizi	6 June 2019	Junior World Championships	Suva, Fiji	20 years, 148 days	
109 kg
Snatch	148 kg	Alireza lotfi	7 June 2019	Junior World Championships	Suva, Fiji	20 years, 75 days	
Clean & Jerk	191 kg	Alireza lotfi	7 June 2019	Junior World Championships	Suva, Fiji	20 years, 75 days	
Total	339 kg	Alireza lotfi	7 June 2019	Junior World Championships	Suva, Fiji	20 years, 75 days	
+109 kg
Snatch	197 kg	Ali Davoudi	10 November 2018	World Championships	Ashgabat, Turkmenistan	19 years, 233 days	JWR
Clean & Jerk	246 kg	Alireza Yousefi	13 May 2023	Asian Championships	Jinju, South Korea	19 years, 259 days	JWR
Total	436 kg	Alireza Yousefi	13 May 2023	Asian Championships	Jinju, South Korea	19 years, 259 days	JWR

=== Women ===
Event	Record	Athlete	Date	Meet	Place	Age	Ref/Note
45 kg
Snatch							
Clean & Jerk	68 kg	Seyedeh Zahra Hosseini	6 October 2021	World Youth Championships	Jeddah, Saudi Arabia	13 years, 63 days	
Total							
49 kg
Snatch	63 kg	Anita Feizi	30 July 2023	Asian Youth Championships	Greater Noida, India	16 years, 273 days	
Clean & Jerk	83 kg	Anita Feizi	30 July 2023	Asian Youth Championships	Greater Noida, India	16 years, 273 days	
Total	146 kg	Anita Feizi	30 July 2023	Asian Youth Championships	Greater Noida, India	16 years, 273 days	
55 kg
Snatch	68 kg	Seyedeh Ghazal Hosseini	7 October 2021	World Youth Championships	Jeddah, Saudi Arabia	15 years, 115 days	
Clean & Jerk	84 kg	Seyedeh Ghazal Hosseini	7 October 2021	World Youth Championships	Jeddah, Saudi Arabia	15 years, 115 days	
Total	152 kg	Seyedeh Ghazal Hosseini	7 October 2021	World Youth Championships	Jeddah, Saudi Arabia	15 years, 115 days	
59 kg
Snatch	81 kg	Reihaneh Karimi	1 August 2023	Asian Junior Championships	Greater Noida, India	17 years, 233 days	
Clean & Jerk	107 kg	Reihaneh Karimi	1 August 2023	Asian Junior Championships	Greater Noida, India	17 years, 233 days	
Total	188 kg	Reihaneh Karimi	1 August 2023	Asian Junior Championships	Greater Noida, India	17 years, 233 days	
64 kg
Snatch	86 kg	Fatemeh Keshavarz	1 August 2023	Asian Junior Championships	Greater Noida, India	18 years, 277 days	
Clean & Jerk	111 kg	Fatemeh Keshavarz	1 August 2023	Asian Junior Championships	Greater Noida, India	18 years, 277 days	
Total	197 kg	Fatemeh Keshavarz	1 August 2023	Asian Junior Championships	Greater Noida, India	18 years, 277 days	
71 kg
Snatch	95 kg	Reihaneh Karimi	3 May 2025	World Junior Championships	Lima, Peru	19 years, 143 days	
Clean & Jerk	123 kg	Reihaneh Karimi	7 February 2024	Asian Championships	Tashkent, Uzbekistan	18 years, 58 days	
Total	217 kg	Reihaneh Karimi	3 May 2025	World Junior Championships	Lima, Peru	19 years, 143 days	
76 kg
Snatch	98 kg	Ghazaleh Hosseini	3 May 2025	World Junior Championships	Lima, Peru	18 years, 323 days	
Clean & Jerk	121 kg	Ghazaleh Hosseini	3 May 2025	World Junior Championships	Lima, Peru	18 years, 323 days	
Total	219 kg	Ghazaleh Hosseini	3 May 2025	World Junior Championships	Lima, Peru	18 years, 323 days	
81 kg
Snatch	93 kg	Elnaz Bajalani	23 April 2021	Asian Championships	Tashkent, Uzbekistan	17 years, 364 days	
Clean & Jerk	115 kg	Yekta Jamali	11 October 2021	Youth World Championships	Jeddah, Saudi Arabia	16 years, 299 days	
Total	205 kg	Yekta Jamali	11 October 2021	Youth World Championships	Jeddah, Saudi Arabia	16 years, 299 days	
87 kg
Snatch	100 kg	Yekta Jamali	16 December 2021	World Championships	Tashkent, Uzbekistan	17 years, 0 days	
Clean & Jerk	122 kg	Yekta Jamali	16 December 2021	World Championships	Tashkent, Uzbekistan	17 years, 0 days	
Total	222 kg	Yekta Jamali	16 December 2021	World Championships	Tashkent, Uzbekistan	17 years, 0 days	
+87 kg
Snatch							
Clean & Jerk							
Total							

== Historical records ==
=== Men (1998 - 2018) ===
Event	Record	Athlete	Date	Meet	Place	Age	Ref/Note
56 kg
Snatch	123 kg	Majid Askari	30 June 2011	Junior World Championships	Penang, Malaysia	19 years, 234 days	
Clean & Jerk	150 kg	Majid Askari	30 June 2011	Junior World Championships	Penang, Malaysia	19 years, 234 days	
Total	273 kg	Majid Askari	30 June 2011	Junior World Championships	Penang, Malaysia	19 years, 234 days	
62 kg
Snatch	140 kg	Mehdi Panzvan	17 September 2000	Olympic Games	Sydney, Australia	19 years, 213 days	
Clean & Jerk	162 kg	Mehdi Panzvan	17 September 2000	Olympic Games	Sydney, Australia	19 years, 213 days	
Total	302 kg	Mehdi Panzvan	17 September 2000	Olympic Games	Sydney, Australia	19 years, 213 days	
69 kg
Snatch	140 kg	Jaber Behrouzi	29 November 2011	Asian Interclub Championships	Tashkent, Uzbekistan	20 years, 99 days	
Clean & Jerk	171 kg	Morteza Rezaeian	17 June 2009	Junior World Championships	Bucharest, Romania	20 years, 3 days	
Total	310 kg	Jaber Behrouzi	29 November 2011	Asian Interclub Championships	Tashkent, Uzbekistan	20 years, 99 days	
77 kg
Snatch	161 kg	Kianoush Rostami	23 September 2010	World Championships	Antalya, Turkey	19 years, 62 days	
Clean & Jerk	193 kg	Kianoush Rostami	23 September 2010	World Championships	Antalya, Turkey	19 years, 62 days	
Total	354 kg	Kianoush Rostami	23 September 2010	World Championships	Antalya, Turkey	19 years, 62 days	
85 kg
Snatch	173 kg	Kianoush Rostami	11 November 2011	World Championships	Paris, France	20 years, 111 days	
Clean & Jerk	210 kg	Kianoush Rostami	4 July 2011	Junior World Championships	Penang, Malaysia	19 years, 346 days	
Total	382 kg	Kianoush Rostami	11 November 2011	World Championships	Paris, France	20 years, 111 days	
94 kg
Snatch	183 kg	Saeid Mohammadpour	4 August 2012	Olympic Games	London, United Kingdom	19 years, 154 days	JAR
Clean & Jerk	221 kg	Saeid Mohammadpour	12 November 2011	World Championships	Paris, France	18 years, 254 days	
Total	402 kg	Saeid Mohammadpour	12 November 2011	World Championships	Paris, France	18 years, 254 days	
105 kg
Snatch	176 kg	Saeid Sayyar	18 May 2012	Junior World Championships	Antigua, Guatemala	20 years, 119 days	
Clean & Jerk	215 kg	Hossein Tavakkoli	12 December 1998	Asian Games	Bangkok, Thailand	20 years, 336 days	
Total	390 kg	Hossein Tavakkoli	12 December 1998	Asian Games	Bangkok, Thailand	20 years, 336 days	
+105 kg
Snatch	206 kg	Saeid Alihosseini	8 December 2008	Asian Junior Championships	Jeonju, South Korea	20 years, 310 days	JWR
Clean & Jerk	245 kg	Saeid Alihosseini	8 December 2008	Asian Junior Championships	Jeonju, South Korea	20 years, 310 days	JWR
Total	451 kg	Saeid Alihosseini	8 December 2008	Asian Junior Championships	Jeonju, South Korea	20 years, 310 days	JWR
