= Ali Ammar (weightlifter) =

Iraqi weightlifter (born 2004)

- Ammar at the 2024 Olympics

Personal information
- Born: Ali Ammar Yusur Rubaiawi; 2 August 2004 (age 22) Baghdad, Iraq

Sport
- Country: Iraq
- Sport: Weightlifting
Medal record
Weightlifting
Representing Iraq
World Championships
Gold medal – first place	2026 Ningbo	+110 kg
Asian Games
Silver medal – second place	2026 Aichi–Nagoya	+110 kg
Asian Championships
Bronze medal – third place	2024 Tashkent	+109 kg
Islamic Solidarity Games
Silver medal – second place	2025 Riyadh	+110 kg S
Silver medal – second place	2025 Riyadh	+110 kg C
Silver medal – second place	2025 Riyadh	+110 kg T
Asian Junior Championships
Gold medal – first place	2024 Doha	+109 kg

Ali Ammar Yusur Rubaiawi (born 2 August 2004) is an Iraqi weightlifter who is the 2026 world champion and the current world record holder in the snatch in the +110 kg class.

== Biography ==
Ali Ammar was born in Baghdad.

In August 2024, he finished in sixth place in the men's +102 kg event at the 2024 Summer Olympics held in Paris, France.

At the 2026 Asian Games, Ali snatched 219 kg for a world record and the second heaviest snatch in weightlifting history behind Lasha Talakhadze. His next competition, the 2026 World Weightlifting Championships, he won his first overall gold medal and a gold medal in the snatch.

== Major results ==
Year	Venue	Weight	Snatch (kg)				Clean & Jerk (kg)				Total	Rank
Year	Venue	Weight	1	2	3	Rank	1	2	3	Rank	Total	Rank
Olympic Games
2024	Paris, France	+102 kg	~~195~~	195	200 JWR	—N/a	230	237	~~247~~	—N/a	437 JWR	6
World Championships
2023	Riyadh, Saudi Arabia	+109 kg	185	190	198 JWR	7	221	~~228~~	~~231~~	11	419	7
2024	Manama, Bahrain	+109 kg	201	204 JWR	~~207~~	4	~~234~~	237	247 JWR	4	451 JWR	5
2026	Ningbo, China	+110 kg	206	211	~~220~~	1st place, gold medalist(s)	240	250	255	2nd place, silver medalist(s)	466	1st place, gold medalist(s)
Asian Games
2026	Nagoya, Japan	+110 kg	210	215	219 WR	—	240	246	~~252~~	—	465	2nd place, silver medalist(s)
Asian Championships
2022	Manama, Bahrain	–109 kg	~~170~~	~~171~~	~~172~~	—	~~200~~	201	207	5	—	—
2023	Jinju, South Korea	–109 kg	172	176	178	1st place, gold medalist(s)	202	211	~~215~~	5	389	4
2024	Tashkent, Uzbekistan	+109 kg	191	~~199~~	~~199~~	4	220	231	234	3rd place, bronze medalist(s)	425	3rd place, bronze medalist(s)
IWF World Cup
2024	Phuket, Thailand	+109 kg	~~195~~	195	~~199~~	6	232	—	—	5	427	5
Junior World Championships
2022	Heraklion, Greece	–109 kg	161	163	168	2nd place, silver medalist(s)	191	~~197~~	~~197~~	2nd place, silver medalist(s)	359	2nd place, silver medalist(s)
Asian Junior Championships
2022	Tashkent, Uzbekistan	–109 kg	160	167	171	1st place, gold medalist(s)	192	197	202	2nd place, silver medalist(s)	373	1st place, gold medalist(s)
2024	Doha, Qatar	+109 kg	180	—	—	1st place, gold medalist(s)	226	—	—	1st place, gold medalist(s)	406	1st place, gold medalist(s)
Youth World Championships
2021	Jeddah, Saudi Arabia	–102 kg	143	149	~~153~~	4	170	180	185	2nd place, silver medalist(s)	334	3rd place, bronze medalist(s)
