= 2022 Asian Youth & Junior Weightlifting Championships =

International weightlifting competition

- Host city: Tashkent, Uzbekistan
- Dates: 15-25 July
- Main venue: Uzbekistan Sports Complex

The 2022 Asian Youth & Junior Weightlifting Championships were held in Tashkent, Uzbekistan from 15 to 25 July 2022.

== Medal summary ==
=== Junior men's ===
Event	Gold		Silver		Bronze	
55 kg
Snatch	Đỗ Tú Tùng; Vietnam	116 kg	Dương Tuấn Kiệt; Vietnam	112 kg	Satrio Adi Nugroho; Indonesia	111 kg
Clean & Jerk	Đỗ Tú Tùng; Vietnam	143 kg	Satrio Adi Nugroho; Indonesia	141 kg	Dương Tuấn Kiệt; Vietnam	136 kg
Total	Đỗ Tú Tùng; Vietnam	259 kg	Satrio Adi Nugroho; Indonesia	252 kg	Dương Tuấn Kiệt; Vietnam	248 kg
61 kg
Snatch	Shin Rok; South Korea	126 kg	T Madhavan; India	121 kg	Diyorbek Ruzmetov; Uzbekistan	116 kg
Clean & Jerk	Shin Rok; South Korea	155 kg	Azamat Tolegen; Kazakhstan	150 kg	Cho Min-jae; South Korea	147 kg
Total	Shin Rok; South Korea	281 kg	T Madhavan; India	265 kg	Azamat Tolegen; Kazakhstan	262 kg
67 kg
Snatch	Weeraphon Wichuma; Thailand	135 kg	Alisher Baiburov; Kazakhstan	134 kg	Khusniboy Matrasulov; Uzbekistan	127 kg
Clean & Jerk	Weeraphon Wichuma; Thailand	165 kg	Alisher Baiburov; Kazakhstan	155 kg	Khusniboy Matrasulov; Uzbekistan	151 kg
Total	Weeraphon Wichuma; Thailand	300 kg	Alisher Baiburov; Kazakhstan	289 kg	Khusniboy Matrasulov; Uzbekistan	278 kg
73 kg
Snatch	Rizki Juniansyah; Indonesia	157 kg JWR	Alexey Churkin; Kazakhstan	145 kg	Kỷ Bùi Sư; Vietnam	140 kg
Clean & Jerk	Rizki Juniansyah; Indonesia	182 kg	Kỷ Bùi Sư; Vietnam	181 kg	Alexey Churkin; Kazakhstan	180 kg
Total	Rizki Juniansyah; Indonesia	339 kg	Alexey Churkin; Kazakhstan	325 kg	Kỷ Bùi Sư; Vietnam	321 kg
81 kg
Snatch	Park Hyeon-go; South Korea	156 kg	Yegor Sherer; Kazakhstan	150 kg	Nguyễn Quốc Toàn; Vietnam	147 kg
Clean & Jerk	Park Hyeon-go; South Korea	186 kg	Nguyễn Quốc Toàn; Vietnam	185 kg	Yegor Sherer; Kazakhstan	175 kg
Total	Park Hyeon-go; South Korea	342 kg	Nguyễn Quốc Toàn; Vietnam	332 kg	Yegor Sherer; Kazakhstan	325 kg
89 kg
Snatch	Alireza Moeini Sedeh; Iran	166 kg AJR	Khojiakbar Olimov; Uzbekistan	145 kg	Klim Bashargin; Kazakhstan	143 kg
Clean & Jerk	Khojiakbar Olimov; Uzbekistan	192 kg	Alireza Moeini Sedeh; Iran	191 kg	Ali Keshtkar; Iran	186 kg
Total	Alireza Moeini Sedeh; Iran	357 kg	Khojiakbar Olimov; Uzbekistan	337 kg	Ali Keshtkar; Iran	327 kg
96 kg
Snatch	Mohammadtofigh Pouzesh; Iran	155 kg	Ali Al-Othman; Saudi Arabia	151 kg	Jeong Hui-jun; South Korea	145 kg
Clean & Jerk	Ali Al-Othman; Saudi Arabia	193 kg	Mohammadtofigh Pouzesh; Iran	183 kg	Jeong Hui-jun; South Korea	178 kg
Total	Ali Al-Othman; Saudi Arabia	344 kg	Mohammadtofigh Pouzesh; Iran	338 kg	Jeong Hui-jun; South Korea	323 kg
102 kg
Snatch	Sharofiddin Amriddinov; Uzbekistan	165 kg	Nikita Abdrakhmanov; Kazakhstan	158 kg	Kudratbek Salimjonov; Uzbekistan	156 kg
Clean & Jerk	Sharofiddin Amriddinov; Uzbekistan	197 kg	Nikita Abdrakhmanov; Kazakhstan	196 kg	Cha Byung-jun; South Korea	175 kg
Total	Sharofiddin Amriddinov; Uzbekistan	362 kg	Nikita Abdrakhmanov; Kazakhstan	354 kg	Kudratbek Salimjonov; Uzbekistan	324 kg
109 kg
Snatch	Ammar Rubaiawi; Iraq	171 kg	Mohammad Mamivand; Iran	161 kg	Nurbol Abdurashitov; Uzbekistan	145 kg
Clean & Jerk	Mohammad Mamivand; Iran	203 kg	Ammar Rubaiawi; Iraq	202 kg	Nurbol Abdurashitov; Uzbekistan	171 kg
Total	Ammar Rubaiawi; Iraq	373 kg	Mohammad Mamivand; Iran	364 kg	Nurbol Abdurashitov; Uzbekistan	316 kg
+109 kg
Snatch	Mirhosil Mirzabaev; Uzbekistan	176 kg	Alireza Esfandiari; Iran	175 kg	Nam Ji-yong; South Korea	159 kg
Clean & Jerk	Nam Ji-yong; South Korea	212 kg	Alireza Esfandiari; Iran	211 kg	Mirhosil Mirzabaev; Uzbekistan	206 kg
Total	Alireza Esfandiari; Iran	386 kg	Mirhosil Mirzabaev; Uzbekistan	382 kg	Nam Ji-yong; South Korea	371 kg

=== Junior women's ===
Event	Gold		Silver		Bronze	
45 kg
Snatch	Rose Jean Ramos; Philippines	70 kg	Harshada Garud; India	69 kg	Nguyễn Thị Hoài; Vietnam	68 kg
Clean & Jerk	Harshada Garud; India	88 kg	Nguyễn Thị Hoài; Vietnam	84 kg	Rose Jean Ramos; Philippines	83 kg
Total	Harshada Garud; India	157 kg	Rose Jean Ramos; Philippines	153 kg	Nguyễn Thị Hoài; Vietnam	152 kg
49 kg
Snatch	Rosegie Ramos; Philippines	80 kg	Nguyễn Bích Trâm; Vietnam	76 kg	Phan Thị Tuyết Ngọc; Vietnam	74 kg
Clean & Jerk	Rosegie Ramos; Philippines	96 kg	Nguyễn Bích Trâm; Vietnam	94 kg	Phan Thị Tuyết Ngọc; Vietnam	90 kg
Total	Rosegie Ramos; Philippines	176 kg	Nguyễn Bích Trâm; Vietnam	170 kg	Phan Thị Tuyết Ngọc; Vietnam	164 kg
55 kg
Snatch	Jamila Panfilova; Uzbekistan	85 kg	Poisian Yodsarn; Thailand	81 kg	Yekaterina Alyakina; Kazakhstan	79 kg
Clean & Jerk	Võ Thị Ngọc Thanh; Vietnam	103 kg	Poisian Yodsarn; Thailand	103 kg	Juliana Klarisa; Indonesia	102 kg
Total	Poisian Yodsarn; Thailand	184 kg	Jamila Panfilova; Uzbekistan	183 kg	Juliana Klarisa; Indonesia	180 kg
59 kg
Snatch	Quàng Thị Tâm; Vietnam	89 kg	Sarah; Indonesia	88 kg	Khongorzul Boldbaatar; Mongolia	84 kg
Clean & Jerk	Quàng Thị Tâm; Vietnam	111 kg	Khongorzul Boldbaatar; Mongolia	108 kg	Sarah; Indonesia	107 kg
Total	Quàng Thị Tâm; Vietnam	200 kg	Sarah; Indonesia	195 kg	Khongorzul Boldbaatar; Mongolia	192 kg
64 kg
Snatch	Lee Eun-hwa; South Korea	95 kg	Thipwara Chontavin; Thailand	89 kg	Medine Amanowa; Turkmenistan	85 kg
Clean & Jerk	Lee Eun-hwa; South Korea	117 kg	Thipwara Chontavin; Thailand	110 kg	Barchinoy Eshkulova; Uzbekistan	106 kg
Total	Lee Eun-hwa; South Korea	212 kg	Thipwara Chontavin; Thailand	199 kg	Medine Amanowa; Turkmenistan	189 kg
71 kg
Snatch	Vanessa Sarno; Philippines	100 kg	Kim Hye-min; South Korea	93 kg	Restu Anggi; Indonesia	92 kg
Clean & Jerk	Vanessa Sarno; Philippines	130 kg	Restu Anggi; Indonesia	120 kg	Kim Hye-min; South Korea	118 kg
Total	Vanessa Sarno; Philippines	230 kg	Restu Anggi; Indonesia	212 kg	Kim Hye-min; South Korea	211 kg
76 kg
Snatch	Duangkamon Khongthong; Thailand	94 kg	Hà Thị Hoa; Vietnam	85 kg	Madina Fayzullayeva; Uzbekistan	82 kg
Clean & Jerk	Duangkamon Khongthong; Thailand	122 kg	Hà Thị Hoa; Vietnam	108 kg	Gombosürengiin Enerel; Mongolia	107 kg
Total	Duangkamon Khongthong; Thailand	216 kg	Hà Thị Hoa; Vietnam	193 kg	Madina Fayzullayeva; Uzbekistan	188 kg
81 kg
Snatch	Nigora Suvonova; Uzbekistan	95 kg	Dinara Kipshakbay; Kazakhstan	89 kg	Anamjan Rustamowa; Turkmenistan	88 kg
Clean & Jerk	Nigora Suvonova; Uzbekistan	117 kg	Anamjan Rustamowa; Turkmenistan	113 kg	Dinara Kipshakbay; Kazakhstan	111 kg
Total	Nigora Suvonova; Uzbekistan	212 kg	Anamjan Rustamowa; Turkmenistan	201 kg	Dinara Kipshakbay; Kazakhstan	200 kg
87 kg
Snatch	Tursunoy Jabborova; Uzbekistan	108 kg	Hồ Thị Hà Phương; Vietnam	88 kg	Kamola Karimova; Uzbekistan	77 kg
Clean & Jerk	Tursunoy Jabborova; Uzbekistan	127 kg	Hồ Thị Hà Phương; Vietnam	106 kg	Kamola Karimova; Uzbekistan	105 kg
Total	Tursunoy Jabborova; Uzbekistan	235 kg	Hồ Thị Hà Phương; Vietnam	194 kg	Kamola Karimova; Uzbekistan	182 kg
+87 kg
Snatch	Park Hye-jeong; South Korea	115 kg	Aisamal Sansyzbayeva; Kazakhstan	104 kg	Trần Thị Hiền; Vietnam	100 kg
Clean & Jerk	Park Hye-jeong; South Korea	155 kg	Aisamal Sansyzbayeva; Kazakhstan	130 kg	Trần Thị Hiền; Vietnam	125 kg
Total	Park Hye-jeong; South Korea	270 kg	Aisamal Sansyzbayeva; Kazakhstan	234 kg	Trần Thị Hiền; Vietnam	225 kg

=== Youth men's ===
Event	Gold		Silver		Bronze	
49 kg
Snatch	A Tiêu; Vietnam	91 kg	Bùi Minh Đạo; Vietnam	85 kg	Dhanush Loganathan; India	85 kg
Clean & Jerk	Bùi Minh Đạo; Vietnam	111 kg	A Tiêu; Vietnam	104 kg	Prince Delos Santos; Philippines	103 kg
Total	Bùi Minh Đạo; Vietnam	196 kg	A Tiêu; Vietnam	195 kg	Prince Delos Santos; Philippines	186 kg
55 kg
Snatch	K'Dương; Vietnam	113 kg YWR	Dương Tuấn Kiệt; Vietnam	112 kg	Gurunaidu Sanapathi; India	104 kg
Clean & Jerk	K'Dương; Vietnam	143 kg YWR	Dương Tuấn Kiệt; Vietnam	136 kg	Perhat Bagtyýarow; Turkmenistan	125 kg
Total	K'Dương; Vietnam	256 kg YWR	Dương Tuấn Kiệt; Vietnam	248 kg	Yerassyl Umarov; Kazakhstan	228 kg
61 kg
Snatch	Diyorbek Ruzmetov; Uzbekistan	116 kg	K'Brừm; Vietnam	112 kg	A Tân; Vietnam	111 kg
Clean & Jerk	Diyorbek Ruzmetov; Uzbekistan	137 kg	Golom Tinku; India	137 kg	K'Brừm; Vietnam	132 kg
Total	Diyorbek Ruzmetov; Uzbekistan	253 kg	K'Brừm; Vietnam	244 kg	Golom Tinku; India	241 kg
67 kg
Snatch	Alisher Baiburov; Kazakhstan	134 kg	Park Ju-hyeon; South Korea	115 kg	Bobur Umidov; Uzbekistan	114 kg
Clean & Jerk	Alisher Baiburov; Kazakhstan	155 kg	Kim Yo-han; South Korea	146 kg	Ahliddin Hasanov; Uzbekistan	143 kg
Total	Alisher Baiburov; Kazakhstan	289 kg	Park Ju-hyeon; South Korea	255 kg	Bobur Umidov; Uzbekistan	255 kg
73 kg
Snatch	Diyorbek Ermatov; Uzbekistan	137 kg	Yedige Yemberdi; Kazakhstan	136 kg	Worrapot Nasuriwong; Thailand	135 kg
Clean & Jerk	Yedige Yemberdi; Kazakhstan	173 kg YWR	Worrapot Nasuriwong; Thailand	172 kg	Krishna Venkata; India	153 kg
Total	Yedige Yemberdi; Kazakhstan	309 kg YWR	Worrapot Nasuriwong; Thailand	307 kg	Diyorbek Ermatov; Uzbekistan	287 kg
81 kg
Snatch	Ghorbani Amirhossein; Iran	141 kg	Denis Poluboyarinov; Kazakhstan	140 kg	Iliya Salehipour; Iran	134 kg
Clean & Jerk	Denis Poluboyarinov; Kazakhstan	173 kg	Iliya Salehipour; Iran	171 kg	Ghorbani Amirhossein; Iran	165 kg
Total	Denis Poluboyarinov; Kazakhstan	313 kg	Ghorbani Amirhossein; Iran	306 kg	Iliya Salehipour; Iran	305 kg
89 kg
Snatch	Saparly Muhyýew; Turkmenistan	135 kg	Begis Kenesbayev; Uzbekistan	129 kg	Husain Husain; Bahrain	127 kg
Clean & Jerk	Saparly Muhyýew; Turkmenistan	165 kg	Begis Kenesbayev; Uzbekistan	164 kg	Husain Husain; Bahrain	161 kg
Total	Saparly Muhyýew; Turkmenistan	300 kg	Begis Kenesbayev; Uzbekistan	293 kg	Husain Husain; Bahrain	288 kg
96 kg
Snatch	Abrorbek Marufbekov; Uzbekistan	136 kg	Sepah Amirhosein; Iran	135 kg	Surajbek Sapaýew; Turkmenistan	135 kg
Clean & Jerk	Abrorbek Marufbekov; Uzbekistan	163 kg	Surajbek Sapaýew; Turkmenistan	159 kg	Sepah Amirhosein; Iran	155 kg
Total	Abrorbek Marufbekov; Uzbekistan	299 kg	Surajbek Sapaýew; Turkmenistan	294 kg	Sepah Amirhosein; Iran	290 kg
102 kg
Snatch	Nikita Abdrakhmanov; Kazakhstan	158 kg	Kudratbek Salimjonov; Uzbekistan	156 kg	Ali Ismail; Syria	135 kg
Clean & Jerk	Nikita Abdrakhmanov; Kazakhstan	196 kg	Kudratbek Salimjonov; Uzbekistan	168 kg	Ali Ismail; Syria	161 kg
Total	Nikita Abdrakhmanov; Kazakhstan	354 kg	Kudratbek Salimjonov; Uzbekistan	324 kg	Ali Ismail; Syria	296 kg
+102 kg
Snatch	Taha Nematimoghaddam; Iran	150 kg	Nurbol Abdurashitov; Uzbekistan	145 kg	Jghili Kaswara; Syria	137 kg
Clean & Jerk	Taha Nematimoghaddam; Iran	190 kg	Nurbol Abdurashitov; Uzbekistan	171 kg	Sanzhar Zholtay; Kazakhstan	170 kg
Total	Taha Nematimoghaddam; Iran	340 kg	Nurbol Abdurashitov; Uzbekistan	316 kg	Sanzhar Zholtay; Kazakhstan	306 kg

=== Youth women's ===
Event	Gold		Silver		Bronze	
40 kg
Snatch	Angeline Colonia; Philippines	62 kg YWR	Dương Thị Kim Yến; Vietnam	56 kg	Akansha Kishor Vyavhare; India	55 kg
Clean & Jerk	Dương Thị Kim Yến; Vietnam	73 kg	Angeline Colonia; Philippines	72 kg	Akansha Kishor Vyavhare; India	70 kg
Total	Angeline Colonia; Philippines	134 kg	Dương Thị Kim Yến; Vietnam	129 kg	Akansha Kishor Vyavhare; India	125 kg
45 kg
Snatch	Rose Jean Ramos; Philippines	70 kg	Nguyễn Thị Hoài; Vietnam	66 kg	Najla Khoirunnisa; Indonesia	65 kg
Clean & Jerk	Rose Jean Ramos; Philippines	83 kg	Nguyễn Thị Hoài; Vietnam	82 kg	Soumya Dalvi; India	80 kg
Total	Rose Jean Ramos; Philippines	153 kg	Nguyễn Thị Hoài; Vietnam	146 kg	Soumya Dalvi; India	145 kg
49 kg
Snatch	Rosalinda Faustino; Philippines	71 kg	Đỗ Thị Ngọc Anh; Vietnam	69 kg	Ziyoda Khudoykulova; Uzbekistan	68 kg
Clean & Jerk	Rosalinda Faustino; Philippines	90 kg	Darya Balabayuk; Kazakhstan	86 kg	Thitaphon Tika; Thailand	85 kg
Total	Rosalinda Faustino; Philippines	161 kg	Đỗ Thị Ngọc Anh; Vietnam	152 kg	Thitaphon Tika; Thailand	151 kg
55 kg
Snatch	Hoàng Kim Lụa; Vietnam	77 kg	Laylokhon Polvonnozirova; Uzbekistan	70 kg	Hoàng Thị Kim Oanh; Vietnam	69 kg
Clean & Jerk	Nikita Kalamakar; India	95 kg	Hoàng Kim Lụa; Vietnam	93 kg	Laylokhon Polvonnozirova; Uzbekistan	91 kg
Total	Hoàng Kim Lụa; Vietnam	170 kg	Nikita Kalamakar; India	163 kg	Laylokhon Polvonnozirova; Uzbekistan	161 kg
59 kg
Snatch	Sarah; Indonesia	88 kg	Alina Koliushko; Kazakhstan	77 kg	Sitora Kupaysinova; Uzbekistan	77 kg
Clean & Jerk	Sarah; Indonesia	107 kg	Alina Koliushko; Kazakhstan	96 kg	Gülälek Kakamyradowa; Turkmenistan	93 kg
Total	Sarah; Indonesia	195 kg	Alina Koliushko; Kazakhstan	173 kg	Gülälek Kakamyradowa; Turkmenistan	170 kg
64 kg
Snatch	Medine Amanowa; Turkmenistan	85 kg	Nadezhda Li; Kazakhstan	84 kg	Mashkhura Rustamova; Uzbekistan	78 kg
Clean & Jerk	Medine Amanowa; Turkmenistan	104 kg	Mashkhura Rustamova; Uzbekistan	103 kg	Nadezhda Li; Kazakhstan	100 kg
Total	Medine Amanowa; Turkmenistan	189 kg	Nadezhda Li; Kazakhstan	184 kg	Mashkhura Rustamova; Uzbekistan	181 kg
71 kg
Snatch	Tugs-Erdene Otgonchimeg; Mongolia	89 kg	Dilnoza Fayzullaeva; Uzbekistan	82 kg	Aruzhan Dauletova; Kazakhstan	81 kg
Clean & Jerk	Tugs-Erdene Otgonchimeg; Mongolia	108 kg	Gulshoda Khon Dadamirzayeva; Uzbekistan	100 kg	Aruzhan Dauletova; Kazakhstan	99 kg
Total	Tugs-Erdene Otgonchimeg; Mongolia	197 kg	Aruzhan Dauletova; Kazakhstan	180 kg	Dilnoza Fayzullaeva; Uzbekistan	179 kg
76 kg
Snatch	Madina Fullayeva; Uzbekistan	82 kg	Lkhagvajav Bolortuya; Mongolia	77 kg	Not awarded, lack of entries	
Clean & Jerk	Madina Fullayeva; Uzbekistan	106 kg	Lkhagvajav Bolortuya; Mongolia	97 kg	Not awarded, lack of entries	
Total	Madina Fullayeva; Uzbekistan	188 kg	Lkhagvajav Bolortuya; Mongolia	174 kg	Not awarded, lack of entries	
81 kg
Snatch	Nigora Suvonova; Uzbekistan	95 kg	Anamjan Rustamowa; Turkmenistan	88 kg	Pallimakkal Amritha; India	74 kg
Clean & Jerk	Nigora Suvonova; Uzbekistan	117 kg	Anamjan Rustamowa; Turkmenistan	113 kg	Pallimakkal Amritha; India	94 kg
Total	Nigora Suvonova; Uzbekistan	212 kg	Anamjan Rustamowa; Turkmenistan	201 kg	Pallimakkal Amritha; India	168 kg
+81 kg
Snatch	Trần Thị Hiền; Vietnam	100 kg	Martina Maibam; India	85 kg	Xushnova Xalikova; Uzbekistan	81 kg
Clean & Jerk	Trần Thị Hiền; Vietnam	125 kg	Martina Maibam; India	105 kg	Xushnova Xalikova; Uzbekistan	104 kg
Total	Trần Thị Hiền; Vietnam	225 kg	Martina Maibam; India	190 kg	Xushnova Xalikova; Uzbekistan	185 kg

== Medal table ==
=== Junior ===
Ranking by Big (Total result) medals

* Host nation (Uzbekistan)

Rank	Nation	Gold	Silver	Bronze	Total
1	South Korea	4	0	3	7
2	Uzbekistan*	3	3	5	11
3	Thailand	3	1	0	4
4	Vietnam	2	4	5	11
5	Iran	2	2	1	5
6	Philippines	2	1	0	3
7	Indonesia	1	3	1	5
8	India	1	1	0	2
9	Iraq	1	0	0	1
9	Saudi Arabia	1	0	0	1
11	Kazakhstan	0	4	3	7
12	Turkmenistan	0	1	1	2
13	Mongolia	0	0	1	1
Totals (13 entries)		20	20	20	60

Ranking by all medals: Big (Total result) and Small (Snatch and Clean & Jerk)

* Host nation (Uzbekistan)

Rank	Nation	Gold	Silver	Bronze	Total
1	South Korea	13	1	9	23
2	Uzbekistan*	12	4	16	32
3	Vietnam	7	14	13	34
4	Thailand	7	5	0	12
5	Philippines	7	1	1	9
6	Iran	5	7	2	14
7	Indonesia	3	6	5	14
8	India	2	3	0	5
9	Iraq	2	1	0	3
9	Saudi Arabia	2	1	0	3
11	Kazakhstan	0	14	8	22
12	Turkmenistan	0	2	3	5
13	Mongolia	0	1	3	4
Totals (13 entries)		60	60	60	180

=== Youth ===
Ranking by Big (Total result) medals

* Host nation (Uzbekistan)

Rank	Nation	Gold	Silver	Bronze	Total
1	Vietnam	4	6	0	10
2	Uzbekistan*	4	3	6	13
3	Kazakhstan	4	3	2	9
4	Philippines	3	0	1	4
5	Turkmenistan	2	2	1	5
6	Iran	1	1	2	4
7	Mongolia	1	1	0	2
8	Indonesia	1	0	0	1
9	India	0	2	4	6
10	Thailand	0	1	1	2
11	South Korea	0	1	0	1
12	Bahrain	0	0	1	1
12	Syria	0	0	1	1
Totals (13 entries)		20	20	19	59

Ranking by all medals: Big (Total result) and Small (Snatch and Clean & Jerk)

* Host nation (Uzbekistan)

Rank	Nation	Gold	Silver	Bronze	Total
1	Uzbekistan*	13	13	14	40
2	Vietnam	12	16	3	31
3	Kazakhstan	10	9	6	25
4	Philippines	8	1	2	11
5	Turkmenistan	6	5	4	15
6	Iran	4	3	5	12
7	Mongolia	3	3	0	6
8	Indonesia	3	0	1	4
9	India	1	5	12	18
10	South Korea	0	3	0	3
11	Thailand	0	2	3	5
12	Syria	0	0	4	4
13	Bahrain	0	0	3	3
Totals (13 entries)		60	60	57	177

== Team ranking ==
=== Junior ===
==== Men ====
Rank	Team	Points
1	Uzbekistan	682
2	Iran	681
3	Kazakhstan	624
4	Saudi Arabia	607
5	South Korea	561
6	Turkmenistan	445

==== Women ====
Rank	Team	Points
1	Vietnam	711
2	Uzbekistan	677
3	India	570
4	Kazakhstan	521
5	Mongolia	383
6	South Korea	305

=== Youth ===
==== Men ====
Rank	Team	Points
1	Uzbekistan	702
2	Saudi Arabia	602
3	Kyrgyzstan	472
4	Kazakhstan	465
5	Vietnam	456
6	India	381

==== Women ====
Rank	Team	Points
1	Uzbekistan	710
2	India	682
3	Vietnam	518
4	Philippines	312
5	Kazakhstan	306
6	Turkmenistan	292

== Participating nations ==
=== Junior ===
- Bahrain (2)
- Bangladesh (1)
- India (14)
- Indonesia (6)
- Iran (10)
- Iraq (2)
- Jordan (2)
- Kazakhstan (19)
- Kyrgyzstan (3)
- Mongolia (6)
- Philippines (6)
- Saudi Arabia (14)
- South Korea (12)
- Syria (4)
- Tajikistan (2)
- Thailand (4)
- Turkmenistan (13)
- United Arab Emirates (1)
- Uzbekistan (20) Host
- Vietnam (16)

=== Youth ===
- Bahrain (2)
- Bangladesh (1)
- India (16)
- Indonesia (2)
- Iran (5)
- Jordan (1)
- Kazakhstan (11)
- Kyrgyzstan (8)
- Mongolia (4)
- Philippines (8)
- Saudi Arabia (13)
- South Korea (3)
- Syria (3)
- Tajikistan (1)
- Thailand (3)
- Turkmenistan (8)
- United Arab Emirates (2)
- Uzbekistan (20) Host
- Vietnam (13)

== Junior men's results ==
=== 55 kg ===
Rank	Athlete	Group	Snatch (kg)				Clean & Jerk (kg)				Total
Rank	Athlete	Group	1	2	3	Rank	1	2	3	Rank	Total
1st place, gold medalist(s)	Đỗ Tú Tùng (VIE)	A	110	114	116	1st place, gold medalist(s)	140	143	~~147~~	1st place, gold medalist(s)	259
2nd place, silver medalist(s)	Satrio Adi Nugroho (INA)	A	106	111	~~115~~	3rd place, bronze medalist(s)	135	141	~~144~~	2nd place, silver medalist(s)	252
3rd place, bronze medalist(s)	Dương Tuấn Kiệt (VIE)	A	~~106~~	107	112	2nd place, silver medalist(s)	136	~~142~~	~~142~~	3rd place, bronze medalist(s)	248
4	Joefry Frasco (PHI)	A	100	106	~~108~~	4	~~130~~	130	136	4	242
5	Sanapathi Gurunaidu (IND)	A	97	101	104	5	123	~~126~~	~~126~~	6	227
6	Perhat Bagtyýarow (TKM)	A	97	100	102	6	120	125	~~127~~	5	227
7	Azizbek Shomurodov (UZB)	B	86	90	93	7	111	~~115~~	117	7	210
8	Muhammad Shukurov (TJK)	B	~~65~~	65	~~70~~	8	75	~~80~~	80	8	145

=== 61 kg ===
Rank	Athlete	Group	Snatch (kg)				Clean & Jerk (kg)				Total
Rank	Athlete	Group	1	2	3	Rank	1	2	3	Rank	Total
1st place, gold medalist(s)	Shin Rok (KOR)	A	126	~~130~~	~~133~~	1st place, gold medalist(s)	155	~~161~~	~~161~~	1st place, gold medalist(s)	281
2nd place, silver medalist(s)	T Madhavan (IND)	A	117	~~121~~	121	2nd place, silver medalist(s)	~~144~~	144	~~148~~	4	265
3rd place, bronze medalist(s)	Azamat Tolegen (KAZ)	A	108	~~112~~	112	6	143	146	150	2nd place, silver medalist(s)	262
4	Cho Min-jae (KOR)	A	110	114	~~117~~	4	~~143~~	143	147	3rd place, bronze medalist(s)	261
5	Ruzmetov Diyorbek (UZB)	A	116	~~120~~	~~120~~	3rd place, bronze medalist(s)	133	137	~~142~~	5	253
6	K'Brừm (VIE)	A	105	110	112	5	128	132	~~136~~	6	244
7	Mohammed Al-Marzouq (KSA)	A	109	~~113~~	~~113~~	7	126	130	~~136~~	7	239
8	Khikmatullo Negmatov (TJK)	A	75	~~78~~	78	8	95	~~98~~	98	8	173

=== 67 kg ===
Rank	Athlete	Group	Snatch (kg)				Clean & Jerk (kg)				Total
Rank	Athlete	Group	1	2	3	Rank	1	2	3	Rank	Total
1st place, gold medalist(s)	Weeraphon Wichuma (THA)	A	135	~~138~~	~~138~~	1st place, gold medalist(s)	165	—	—	1st place, gold medalist(s)	300
2nd place, silver medalist(s)	Alisher Baiburov (KAZ)	A	130	~~134~~	134	2nd place, silver medalist(s)	155	~~162~~	~~167~~	2nd place, silver medalist(s)	289
3rd place, bronze medalist(s)	Khusniboy Matrasulov (UZB)	A	119	124	127	3rd place, bronze medalist(s)	141	147	151	3rd place, bronze medalist(s)	278
4	Mukhammedali Tazhidinov (KGZ)	A	~~113~~	113	118	4	135	~~140~~	140	6	258
5	Jaafar Mayya (SYR)	B	105	~~112~~	112	5	131	138	~~142~~	7	250
6	Jassim Al-Zouri (KSA)	A	108	~~113~~	~~115~~	6	135	141	~~144~~	4	249
7	John Macato (PHI)	B	~~105~~	105	~~110~~	7	135	140	~~146~~	5	245
8	Mohammed Al-Zawri (KSA)	B	98	101	103	8	121	125	130	8	233
9	Kampu Degio (IND)	B	98	102	~~105~~	9	123	127	~~132~~	9	229
10	Abdel Jarar (JOR)	B	95	~~100~~	~~100~~	10	~~115~~	115	~~120~~	10	210
11	Khaled Al-Qasimi (UAE)	B	~~92~~	92	~~96~~	11	110	~~115~~	115	11	207

=== 73 kg ===
Rank	Athlete	Group	Snatch (kg)				Clean & Jerk (kg)				Total
Rank	Athlete	Group	1	2	3	Rank	1	2	3	Rank	Total
1st place, gold medalist(s)	Rizki Juniansyah (INA)	A	149	154	157	1st place, gold medalist(s)	182	~~195~~	~~195~~	1st place, gold medalist(s)	339
2nd place, silver medalist(s)	Alexey Churkin (KAZ)	A	140	145	~~148~~	2nd place, silver medalist(s)	175	~~180~~	180	3rd place, bronze medalist(s)	325
3rd place, bronze medalist(s)	Kỷ Bùi Sư (VIE)	A	136	140	~~143~~	3rd place, bronze medalist(s)	170	172	181	2nd place, silver medalist(s)	321
4	Gaýgysyz Töräýew (TKM)	A	131	135	~~138~~	5	165	~~171~~	171	4	306
5	Asadbek Narimanov (UZB)	A	~~130~~	130	139	4	160	~~171~~	~~171~~	7	299
6	Bektimur Reýimow (TKM)	A	134	~~138~~	~~138~~	6	162	~~167~~	~~170~~	5	296
7	Choi Ji-ho (KOR)	A	~~130~~	130	~~136~~	9	161	~~166~~	~~166~~	6	291
8	Ali Alipour (IRI)	A	125	132	~~137~~	8	155	~~166~~	~~166~~	8	287
9	Krishna Venkata (IND)	B	115	119	~~123~~	12	145	149	153	9	272
10	Hassan Al-Marzouq (KSA)	B	113	117	122	10	~~140~~	140	147	10	269
11	Jawad Al-Qaysum (KSA)	B	117	121	~~127~~	11	~~144~~	146	~~154~~	11	267
—	Petr Khrebtov (KAZ)	A	130	~~134~~	134	7	~~163~~	~~163~~	~~163~~	—	—

=== 81 kg ===
Rank	Athlete	Group	Snatch (kg)				Clean & Jerk (kg)				Total
Rank	Athlete	Group	1	2	3	Rank	1	2	3	Rank	Total
1st place, gold medalist(s)	Park Hyeon-go (KOR)	A	148	151	156	1st place, gold medalist(s)	~~181~~	181	186	1st place, gold medalist(s)	342
2nd place, silver medalist(s)	Nguyễn Quốc Toàn (VIE)	A	143	~~147~~	147	3rd place, bronze medalist(s)	176	179	185	2nd place, silver medalist(s)	332
3rd place, bronze medalist(s)	Yegor Sherer (KAZ)	A	140	145	150	2nd place, silver medalist(s)	170	175	~~177~~	3rd place, bronze medalist(s)	325
4	Şahzadbek Matýakubow (TKM)	A	136	141	145	4	~~170~~	171	~~176~~	6	316
5	Denis Poluboyarinov (KAZ)	B	130	135	140	6	~~170~~	170	173	4	313
6	Amirhossein Ghorbani (IRI)	B	125	136	141	5	155	165	~~172~~	7	306
7	Iliya Salehipour (IRI)	B	121	127	134	9	152	159	171	5	305
8	Abbosbek Dulanov (UZB)	A	130	~~136~~	136	7	160	~~174~~	~~176~~	8	296
9	Ýazmämmet Annalyýew (TKM)	A	130	133	~~136~~	11	160	~~164~~	~~164~~	9	293
10	Valluri Ajaya Babu (IND)	B	128	133	~~136~~	10	153	158	~~164~~	10	291
11	Nursultan Tarmalov (KGZ)	B	135	~~142~~	~~142~~	8	150	~~155~~	~~155~~	11	285
12	Hussain Al-Duhaylib (KSA)	B	122	127	~~130~~	12	140	148	~~155~~	12	275

=== 89 kg ===
Rank	Athlete	Group	Snatch (kg)				Clean & Jerk (kg)				Total
Rank	Athlete	Group	1	2	3	Rank	1	2	3	Rank	Total
1st place, gold medalist(s)	Alireza Moeini Sedeh (IRI)	A	151	157	166	1st place, gold medalist(s)	176	185	191	2nd place, silver medalist(s)	357
2nd place, silver medalist(s)	Khojiakbar Olimov (UZB)	A	145	~~152~~	~~152~~	2nd place, silver medalist(s)	180	187	192	1st place, gold medalist(s)	337
3rd place, bronze medalist(s)	Ali Keshtkar (IRI)	A	~~141~~	141	~~145~~	5	175	182	186	3rd place, bronze medalist(s)	327
4	Vương Trương Khôi (VIE)	A	138	142	~~144~~	4	180	183	~~186~~	4	325
5	Bader Aleid Nawaf (KSA)	A	~~135~~	135	140	7	163	168	173	5	313
6	Choi Yun-seok (KOR)	A	135	140	~~143~~	6	162	168	172	6	312
7	Klim Bashargin (KAZ)	A	~~143~~	~~143~~	143	3rd place, bronze medalist(s)	~~168~~	168	—	7	311
8	Saparly Muhyýew (TKM)	B	128	131	135	9	161	~~165~~	165	8	300
9	Shageldi Bayramgeldiyýew (TKM)	A	130	~~135~~	~~137~~	10	160	~~165~~	~~165~~	10	290
10	Husain Husain (BHR)	B	120	~~127~~	127	11	156	161	~~166~~	9	288
11	Abdullah Al-Ahmad (KSA)	B	114	~~118~~	~~121~~	12	~~142~~	142	148	11	262
—	Ali Al-Suwaid (IRQ)	B	133	137	~~141~~	8	—	—	—	—	—

=== 96 kg ===
Rank	Athlete	Group	Snatch (kg)				Clean & Jerk (kg)				Total
Rank	Athlete	Group	1	2	3	Rank	1	2	3	Rank	Total
1st place, gold medalist(s)	Ali Al-Othman (KSA)	A	146	151	~~156~~	2nd place, silver medalist(s)	188	193	~~200~~	1st place, gold medalist(s)	344
2nd place, silver medalist(s)	Mohammadtofigh Pouzesh (IRI)	A	143	150	155	1st place, gold medalist(s)	183	~~190~~	~~191~~	2nd place, silver medalist(s)	338
3rd place, bronze medalist(s)	Jeong Hui-jun (KOR)	A	145	~~150~~	~~151~~	3rd place, bronze medalist(s)	178	~~189~~	~~191~~	3rd place, bronze medalist(s)	323
4	Elnur Satybaldiev (KGZ)	A	125	131	135	5	165	173	~~177~~	4	308
5	Sepah Amirhosein (IRI)	A	~~126~~	126	135	4	~~155~~	155	~~166~~	5	290
6	Jawad Al-Shakhouri (KSA)	A	110	112	~~115~~	6	130	137	140	6	252

=== 102 kg ===
Rank	Athlete	Group	Snatch (kg)				Clean & Jerk (kg)				Total
Rank	Athlete	Group	1	2	3	Rank	1	2	3	Rank	Total
1st place, gold medalist(s)	Sharofiddin Amriddinov (UZB)	A	159	165	~~169~~	1st place, gold medalist(s)	190	195	197	1st place, gold medalist(s)	362
2nd place, silver medalist(s)	Nikita Abdrakhmanov (KAZ)	A	150	155	158	2nd place, silver medalist(s)	180	191	196	2nd place, silver medalist(s)	354
3rd place, bronze medalist(s)	Kudratbek Salimjonov (UZB)	A	146	151	156	3rd place, bronze medalist(s)	168	~~174~~	~~174~~	5	324
4	Cha Byung-jun (KOR)	A	137	~~145~~	145	4	167	175	~~180~~	3rd place, bronze medalist(s)	320
5	Ali Ismail (SYR)	A	120	135	~~141~~	5	150	161	~~165~~	6	296
—	Batyr Atabayýew (TKM)	A	~~140~~	~~140~~	~~141~~	—	160	170	~~175~~	4	—

=== 109 kg ===
Rank	Athlete	Group	Snatch (kg)				Clean & Jerk (kg)				Total
Rank	Athlete	Group	1	2	3	Rank	1	2	3	Rank	Total
1st place, gold medalist(s)	Ammar Rubaiawi (IRQ)	A	160	167	171	1st place, gold medalist(s)	192	197	202	2nd place, silver medalist(s)	373
2nd place, silver medalist(s)	Mohammad Mamivand (IRI)	A	153	161	~~166~~	2nd place, silver medalist(s)	191	203	~~213~~	1st place, gold medalist(s)	364
3rd place, bronze medalist(s)	Nurbol Abdurashitov (UZB)	A	138	~~145~~	145	3rd place, bronze medalist(s)	162	167	171	3rd place, bronze medalist(s)	316

=== +109 kg ===
Rank	Athlete	Group	Snatch (kg)				Clean & Jerk (kg)				Total
Rank	Athlete	Group	1	2	3	Rank	1	2	3	Rank	Total
1st place, gold medalist(s)	Alireza Esfandiari (IRI)	A	160	170	175	2nd place, silver medalist(s)	198	206	211	2nd place, silver medalist(s)	386
2nd place, silver medalist(s)	Mirhosil Mirzabaev (UZB)	A	162	171	176	1st place, gold medalist(s)	200	206	~~211~~	3rd place, bronze medalist(s)	382
3rd place, bronze medalist(s)	Nam Ji-yong (KOR)	A	~~155~~	155	159	3rd place, bronze medalist(s)	~~207~~	207	212	1st place, gold medalist(s)	371
4	Taha Nematimoghaddam (IRI)	A	150	~~162~~	~~162~~	6	180	190	~~200~~	4	340
5	Zhanali Tuyakov (KAZ)	A	140	~~146~~	146	8	180	185	190	5	336
6	Bagdat Mamatkul (KAZ)	A	140	145	148	7	180	185	~~190~~	6	333
7	Turki Al-Yami (KSA)	A	135	~~141~~	141	9	155	165	~~172~~	9	306
8	Jghili Kaswara (SYR)	A	~~130~~	133	137	10	163	168	~~172~~	8	305
9	Alsallaj Raad (JOR)	A	~~130~~	130	~~137~~	11	166	~~171~~	173	7	303
—	Ahmad Alali (SYR)	A	150	157	~~160~~	4	—	—	—	—	—
—	Atajan Daýyýew (TKM)	A	~~155~~	~~156~~	156	5	~~195~~	~~200~~	~~200~~	—	—

== Junior women's results ==
=== 45 kg ===
Rank	Athlete	Group	Snatch (kg)				Clean & Jerk (kg)				Total
Rank	Athlete	Group	1	2	3	Rank	1	2	3	Rank	Total
1st place, gold medalist(s)	Harshada Garud (IND)	A	~~66~~	66	69	2nd place, silver medalist(s)	81	85	88	1st place, gold medalist(s)	157
2nd place, silver medalist(s)	Rose Jean Ramos (PHI)	A	65	67	70	1st place, gold medalist(s)	81	83	~~85~~	3rd place, bronze medalist(s)	153
3rd place, bronze medalist(s)	Nguyễn Thị Hoài (VIE)	A	~~66~~	66	68	3rd place, bronze medalist(s)	~~84~~	84	~~86~~	2nd place, silver medalist(s)	152
4	Anjali Patel (IND)	A	60	63	65	5	76	80	~~83~~	5	145
5	Trần Thị Bắc Giang (VIE)	A	~~63~~	~~63~~	63	6	82	~~84~~	~~84~~	4	145
6	Alexandra Belenko (KAZ)	B	53	56	58	7	68	74	~~77~~	6	132
—	Najla Khoirunnisa (INA)	A	~~64~~	65	~~68~~	4	~~81~~	~~81~~	~~81~~	—	—

=== 49 kg ===
Rank	Athlete	Group	Snatch (kg)				Clean & Jerk (kg)				Total
Rank	Athlete	Group	1	2	3	Rank	1	2	3	Rank	Total
1st place, gold medalist(s)	Rosegie Ramos (PHI)	A	75	78	80	1st place, gold medalist(s)	93	96	~~100~~	1st place, gold medalist(s)	176
2nd place, silver medalist(s)	Nguyễn Bích Trâm (VIE)	A	73	76	~~79~~	2nd place, silver medalist(s)	89	94	~~97~~	2nd place, silver medalist(s)	170
3rd place, bronze medalist(s)	Phan Thị Tuyết Ngọc (VIE)	A	~~74~~	74	~~77~~	3rd place, bronze medalist(s)	90	~~95~~	~~97~~	3rd place, bronze medalist(s)	164
4	Gyaneshwari Yadav (IND)	A	73	~~76~~	77	4	~~84~~	84	87	5	160
5	Erdenezul Buyandelger (MGL)	A	66	69	~~71~~	6	84	~~88~~	88	4	157
6	V Rithika (IND)	A	65	68	71	5	~~83~~	~~83~~	83	7	154
7	Khaled Aameri (KSA)	B	40	42	~~45~~	7	45	50	53	8	95
—	Darya Balabayuk (KAZ)	A	~~67~~	~~67~~	~~67~~	—	81	84	86	6	—

=== 55 kg ===
Rank	Athlete	Group	Snatch (kg)				Clean & Jerk (kg)				Total
Rank	Athlete	Group	1	2	3	Rank	1	2	3	Rank	Total
1st place, gold medalist(s)	Poisian Yodsarn (THA)	A	79	81	~~84~~	2nd place, silver medalist(s)	99	~~103~~	103	2nd place, silver medalist(s)	184
2nd place, silver medalist(s)	Jamila Panfilova (UZB)	A	80	83	85	1st place, gold medalist(s)	95	98	~~101~~	6	183
3rd place, bronze medalist(s)	Juliana Klarisa (INA)	A	78	~~81~~	~~81~~	4	102	~~104~~	~~107~~	3rd place, bronze medalist(s)	180
4	Võ Thị Ngọc Thanh (VIE)	A	72	77	~~80~~	5	96	100	103	1st place, gold medalist(s)	180
5	Yekaterina Alyakina (KAZ)	A	74	77	79	3rd place, bronze medalist(s)	90	95	99	4	178
6	Shrabani Das (IND)	A	74	~~79~~	~~79~~	6	98	~~102~~	~~104~~	5	172
7	Nikita Kalamakar (IND)	B	65	68	~~71~~	11	92	95	~~97~~	7	163
8	Ogulgerek Amanowa (TKM)	B	69	71	~~73~~	7	85	88	91	9	162
9	Giselle Betua (PHI)	B	68	~~70~~	~~70~~	9	90	~~94~~	94	8	162
10	Ozoda Hojiyeva (UZB)	B	68	~~72~~	~~73~~	10	81	85	88	10	156
11	Shynar Zhapar (KAZ)	A	70	~~73~~	~~74~~	8	85	~~90~~	~~90~~	11	155

=== 59 kg ===
Rank	Athlete	Group	Snatch (kg)				Clean & Jerk (kg)				Total
Rank	Athlete	Group	1	2	3	Rank	1	2	3	Rank	Total
1st place, gold medalist(s)	Quàng Thị Tâm (VIE)	A	~~87~~	87	89	1st place, gold medalist(s)	105	109	111	1st place, gold medalist(s)	200
2nd place, silver medalist(s)	Sarah (INA)	A	83	86	88	2nd place, silver medalist(s)	103	107	~~111~~	3rd place, bronze medalist(s)	195
3rd place, bronze medalist(s)	Khongorzul Boldbaatar (MGL)	A	80	84	~~87~~	3rd place, bronze medalist(s)	102	108	~~111~~	2nd place, silver medalist(s)	192
4	Alina Koliushko (KAZ)	A	74	77	~~80~~	4	91	94	96	4	173
5	Gülälek Kakamyradowa (TKM)	A	74	77	~~79~~	5	88	~~91~~	93	5	170
6	Ankita (IND)	A	69	72	~~75~~	6	89	~~92~~	~~94~~	6	161

=== 64 kg ===
Rank	Athlete	Group	Snatch (kg)				Clean & Jerk (kg)				Total
Rank	Athlete	Group	1	2	3	Rank	1	2	3	Rank	Total
1st place, gold medalist(s)	Lee Eun-hwa (KOR)	A	~~90~~	90	95	1st place, gold medalist(s)	113	117	~~120~~	1st place, gold medalist(s)	212
2nd place, silver medalist(s)	Thipwara Chontavin (THA)	A	89	~~91~~	~~91~~	2nd place, silver medalist(s)	110	~~114~~	~~114~~	2nd place, silver medalist(s)	199
3rd place, bronze medalist(s)	Medine Amanowa (TKM)	A	~~81~~	82	85	3rd place, bronze medalist(s)	100	102	104	5	189
4	Barchinoy Eshkulova (UZB)	A	80	~~84~~	~~86~~	6	101	~~105~~	106	3rd place, bronze medalist(s)	186
5	Nadezhda Li (KAZ)	A	~~81~~	81	84	4	~~100~~	~~100~~	100	7	184
6	Senapati Pallavi (IND)	A	80	83	~~85~~	5	100	~~105~~	~~105~~	6	183
7	Madinabonu Djuraeva (UZB)	A	74	77	~~81~~	7	92	102	105	4	182
8	Zainab Yahya (BHR)	A	~~72~~	72	~~74~~	8	90	~~93~~	~~93~~	8	162

=== 71 kg ===
Rank	Athlete	Group	Snatch (kg)				Clean & Jerk (kg)				Total
Rank	Athlete	Group	1	2	3	Rank	1	2	3	Rank	Total
1st place, gold medalist(s)	Vanessa Sarno (PHI)	A	95	~~100~~	100	1st place, gold medalist(s)	120	125	130	1st place, gold medalist(s)	230
2nd place, silver medalist(s)	Restu Anggi (INA)	A	88	~~91~~	92	3rd place, bronze medalist(s)	115	118	120	2nd place, silver medalist(s)	212
3rd place, bronze medalist(s)	Kim Hye-min (KOR)	A	90	93	~~96~~	2nd place, silver medalist(s)	113	116	118	3rd place, bronze medalist(s)	211
4	Park Ye-in (KOR)	A	88	91	~~94~~	4	113	~~116~~	117	4	208
5	Sevinchoy Komilova (UZB)	A	83	86	89	7	110	~~114~~	~~115~~	5	199
6	Tugs-Erdene Otgonchimeg (MGL)	B	81	85	89	6	101	108	~~112~~	6	197
7	Lâm Thị Mỹ Lệ (VIE)	A	~~91~~	91	~~94~~	5	105	~~116~~	~~117~~	7	196
8	Aruzhan Dauletova (KAZ)	B	76	79	81	8	96	~~99~~	99	8	180
9	Nujud Khormi (KSA)	B	~~40~~	40	43	10	50	~~55~~	56	9	99
10	Layan Al-Qurashi (KSA)	B	35	40	43	9	48	53	55	10	98

=== 76 kg ===
Rank	Athlete	Group	Snatch (kg)				Clean & Jerk (kg)				Total
Rank	Athlete	Group	1	2	3	Rank	1	2	3	Rank	Total
1st place, gold medalist(s)	Duangkamon Khongthong (THA)	A	88	91	94	1st place, gold medalist(s)	117	122	~~126~~	1st place, gold medalist(s)	216
2nd place, silver medalist(s)	Hà Thị Hoa (VIE)	A	82	85	~~89~~	2nd place, silver medalist(s)	106	~~108~~	108	2nd place, silver medalist(s)	193
3rd place, bronze medalist(s)	Madina Fayzullayeva (UZB)	A	75	78	82	3rd place, bronze medalist(s)	98	104	106	4	188
4	Jyoti Yadav (IND)	A	78	~~81~~	81	4	101	~~105~~	105	5	186
5	Gombosürengiin Enerel (MGL)	A	~~79~~	~~79~~	79	5	~~103~~	103	107	3rd place, bronze medalist(s)	186
6	Lkhagvajav Bolortüya (MGL)	A	67	74	77	6	~~97~~	97	~~103~~	6	174

=== 81 kg ===
Rank	Athlete	Group	Snatch (kg)				Clean & Jerk (kg)				Total
Rank	Athlete	Group	1	2	3	Rank	1	2	3	Rank	Total
1st place, gold medalist(s)	Nigora Suvonova (UZB)	A	89	93	95	1st place, gold medalist(s)	110	114	117	1st place, gold medalist(s)	212
2nd place, silver medalist(s)	Anamjan Rustamowa (TKM)	A	88	~~91~~	~~92~~	3rd place, bronze medalist(s)	105	109	113	2nd place, silver medalist(s)	201
3rd place, bronze medalist(s)	Dinara Kipshakbay (KAZ)	A	85	89	~~91~~	2nd place, silver medalist(s)	107	~~110~~	111	3rd place, bronze medalist(s)	200

=== 87 kg ===
Rank	Athlete	Group	Snatch (kg)				Clean & Jerk (kg)				Total
Rank	Athlete	Group	1	2	3	Rank	1	2	3	Rank	Total
1st place, gold medalist(s)	Tursunoy Jabborova (UZB)	A	100	105	108	1st place, gold medalist(s)	120	127	~~130~~	1st place, gold medalist(s)	235
2nd place, silver medalist(s)	Hồ Thị Hà Phương (VIE)	A	~~83~~	83	88	2nd place, silver medalist(s)	95	101	106	2nd place, silver medalist(s)	194
3rd place, bronze medalist(s)	Kamola Karimova (UZB)	A	70	77	~~82~~	3rd place, bronze medalist(s)	90	100	105	3rd place, bronze medalist(s)	182

=== +87 kg ===
Rank	Athlete	Group	Snatch (kg)				Clean & Jerk (kg)				Total
Rank	Athlete	Group	1	2	3	Rank	1	2	3	Rank	Total
1st place, gold medalist(s)	Park Hye-jeong (KOR)	A	115	—	—	1st place, gold medalist(s)	~~155~~	155	—	1st place, gold medalist(s)	270
2nd place, silver medalist(s)	Aisamal Sansyzbayeva (KAZ)	A	100	104	—	2nd place, silver medalist(s)	~~130~~	130	—	2nd place, silver medalist(s)	234
3rd place, bronze medalist(s)	Trần Thị Hiền (VIE)	A	86	95	100	3rd place, bronze medalist(s)	115	125	~~130~~	3rd place, bronze medalist(s)	225
4	Xushnova Xalikova (UZB)	A	70	75	81	5	95	100	104	4	185
5	Otgontuya Bayantuul (MGL)	A	77	82	~~85~~	4	95	~~104~~	~~105~~	5	177
6	Sohayba Rahman Rafa (BAN)	A	~~60~~	60	63	6	75	79	~~83~~	6	142

== Youth men's results ==
=== 49 kg ===
Rank	Athlete	Group	Snatch (kg)				Clean & Jerk (kg)				Total
Rank	Athlete	Group	1	2	3	Rank	1	2	3	Rank	Total
1st place, gold medalist(s)	Bùi Minh Đạo (VIE)	A	~~85~~	85	~~90~~	2nd place, silver medalist(s)	106	111	—	1st place, gold medalist(s)	196
2nd place, silver medalist(s)	A Tiêu (VIE)	A	86	91	—	1st place, gold medalist(s)	~~101~~	101	104	2nd place, silver medalist(s)	195
3rd place, bronze medalist(s)	Prince Delos Santos (PHI)	A	80	~~83~~	83	4	101	103	~~105~~	3rd place, bronze medalist(s)	186
4	Dhanush Loganathan (IND)	A	81	~~85~~	85	3rd place, bronze medalist(s)	95	~~100~~	100	4	185
5	Abulmajeed Kulaybi (KSA)	A	72	76	78	5	83	87	92	5	170
6	Bekbol Sarpashev (KGZ)	A	62	~~65~~	~~65~~	7	72	76	81	6	143
7	Hamdan Al-Shehhi (UAE)	A	55	60	63	6	~~65~~	65	70	7	133

=== 55 kg ===
Rank	Athlete	Group	Snatch (kg)				Clean & Jerk (kg)				Total
Rank	Athlete	Group	1	2	3	Rank	1	2	3	Rank	Total
1st place, gold medalist(s)	K'Dương (VIE)	A	105	108	113	1st place, gold medalist(s)	137	143	—	1st place, gold medalist(s)	256
2nd place, silver medalist(s)	Dương Tuấn Kiệt (VIE)	A	~~106~~	107	112	2nd place, silver medalist(s)	136	~~142~~	~~142~~	2nd place, silver medalist(s)	248
3rd place, bronze medalist(s)	Yerassyl Umarov (KAZ)	A	98	101	104	4	~~124~~	~~124~~	124	4	228
4	Gurunaidu Sanapathi (IND)	A	97	101	104	3rd place, bronze medalist(s)	123	~~126~~	~~126~~	5	227
5	Perhat Bagtyýarow (TKM)	A	97	100	102	5	120	125	~~127~~	3rd place, bronze medalist(s)	227
6	Jun Dominic Bohol (PHI)	B	92	~~95~~	~~95~~	9	119	121	~~125~~	6	213
7	Mehrab Davasari (IRI)	B	87	91	94	6	~~115~~	115	118	7	212
8	Azizbek Shomurodov (UZB)	B	86	90	93	7	111	~~115~~	117	8	210
9	Imomiddin Rajapboev (UZB)	B	86	90	93	8	106	~~111~~	111	10	204
10	Husam Al-Dagham (KSA)	B	75	79	82	10	100	105	~~110~~	11	187
—	Patsaphong Thongsuk (THA)	B	~~94~~	~~94~~	~~95~~	—	112	116	~~120~~	9	—

=== 61 kg ===
Rank	Athlete	Group	Snatch (kg)				Clean & Jerk (kg)				Total
Rank	Athlete	Group	1	2	3	Rank	1	2	3	Rank	Total
1st place, gold medalist(s)	Diyorbek Ruzmetov (UZB)	A	116	~~120~~	~~120~~	1st place, gold medalist(s)	133	137	~~142~~	1st place, gold medalist(s)	253
2nd place, silver medalist(s)	K'Brừm (VIE)	A	105	110	112	2nd place, silver medalist(s)	128	132	~~136~~	3rd place, bronze medalist(s)	244
3rd place, bronze medalist(s)	Golom Tinku (IND)	A	99	~~104~~	104	6	131	135	137	2nd place, silver medalist(s)	241
4	Mohammed Al-Marzouq (KSA)	A	109	~~113~~	~~113~~	4	126	130	~~136~~	4	239
5	A Tân (VIE)	A	106	111	~~113~~	3rd place, bronze medalist(s)	120	127	~~131~~	5	238
6	Adrian Cristobal (PHI)	A	100	105	~~108~~	5	~~125~~	125	~~130~~	6	230
7	Khikmatullo Negmatov (TJK)	A	75	~~78~~	78	7	95	~~98~~	~~98~~	7	173

=== 67 kg ===
Rank	Athlete	Group	Snatch (kg)				Clean & Jerk (kg)				Total
Rank	Athlete	Group	1	2	3	Rank	1	2	3	Rank	Total
1st place, gold medalist(s)	Alisher Baiburov (KAZ)	A	130	~~134~~	134	1st place, gold medalist(s)	155	~~162~~	~~167~~	1st place, gold medalist(s)	289
2nd place, silver medalist(s)	Park Ju-hyeon (KOR)	A	110	113	115	2nd place, silver medalist(s)	~~139~~	~~140~~	140	6	255
3rd place, bronze medalist(s)	Bobur Umidov (UZB)	A	108	~~113~~	114	3rd place, bronze medalist(s)	137	141	~~150~~	5	255
4	Kim Yo-han (KOR)	A	100	105	~~108~~	7	140	142	146	2nd place, silver medalist(s)	251
5	Jaafar Mayya (SYR)	B	105	~~112~~	112	4	131	138	~~142~~	7	250
6	Ahliddin Hasanov (UZB)	A	~~107~~	107	~~114~~	6	134	141	143	3rd place, bronze medalist(s)	250
7	Jassim Al-Zouri (KSA)	A	108	~~113~~	~~113~~	5	135	141	~~144~~	4	249
8	Mohammed Al-Zawri (KSA)	B	98	101	103	9	121	125	130	8	233
9	Christian Rodriguez (PHI)	B	100	104	~~107~~	8	125	~~130~~	~~131~~	10	229
10	Kampu Degio (IND)	B	98	102	~~105~~	10	123	127	~~132~~	9	229
11	Abdel Jarar (JOR)	B	95	~~100~~	~~100~~	11	~~115~~	115	~~120~~	11	229
12	Khaled Al-Qasimi (UAE)	B	~~92~~	92	~~96~~	12	110	~~115~~	115	12	207
13	Uulu Nurlanbek (KGZ)	B	88	~~92~~	~~92~~	13	104	108	~~112~~	13	196
14	Chinbat Nyambat (MGL)	B	~~77~~	77	81	14	95	~~100~~	~~100~~	14	176

=== 73 kg ===
Rank	Athlete	Group	Snatch (kg)				Clean & Jerk (kg)				Total
Rank	Athlete	Group	1	2	3	Rank	1	2	3	Rank	Total
1st place, gold medalist(s)	Yedige Yemberdi (KAZ)	B	128	133	136	2nd place, silver medalist(s)	166	170	173	1st place, gold medalist(s)	309
2nd place, silver medalist(s)	Worrapot Nasuriwong (THA)	B	130	~~135~~	135	3rd place, bronze medalist(s)	165	169	172	2nd place, silver medalist(s)	307
3rd place, bronze medalist(s)	Diyorbek Ermatov (UZB)	B	129	134	137	1st place, gold medalist(s)	146	150	~~154~~	4	287
4	Krishna Venkata (IND)	B	115	119	~~123~~	4	145	149	153	3rd place, bronze medalist(s)	272
5	Yousef Al-Medarham (KSA)	B	110	114	~~118~~	6	135	141	146	5	260
6	Soltan Javarov (TKM)	B	113	116	119	5	133	136	140	6	259
7	Uulu Zhenishbek (KGZ)	B	92	97	~~101~~	8	~~111~~	111	118	7	215
8	Sanligrenchin Tsengum (MGL)	B	90	~~96~~	98	7	~~109~~	109	~~116~~	8	207

=== 81 kg ===
Rank	Athlete	Group	Snatch (kg)				Clean & Jerk (kg)				Total
Rank	Athlete	Group	1	2	3	Rank	1	2	3	Rank	Total
1st place, gold medalist(s)	Denis Poluboyarinov (KAZ)	B	130	135	140	2nd place, silver medalist(s)	~~170~~	170	173	1st place, gold medalist(s)	313
2nd place, silver medalist(s)	Ghorbani Amirhossein (IRI)	B	125	136	141	1st place, gold medalist(s)	155	165	~~172~~	3rd place, bronze medalist(s)	306
3rd place, bronze medalist(s)	Iliya Salehipour (IRI)	B	121	127	134	3rd place, bronze medalist(s)	152	159	171	2nd place, silver medalist(s)	305
4	Nurmukhamed Kasenov (KGZ)	B	~~107~~	107	113	5	130	135	138	4	251
5	Vishavjeet Singh (IND)	B	~~112~~	112	115	4	122	127	132	5	247
6	Moslem Al-Hubil (KSA)	B	88	93	~~96~~	6	105	112	~~116~~	6	205

=== 89 kg ===
Rank	Athlete	Group	Snatch (kg)				Clean & Jerk (kg)				Total
Rank	Athlete	Group	1	2	3	Rank	1	2	3	Rank	Total
1st place, gold medalist(s)	Saparly Muhyýew (TKM)	B	128	131	135	1st place, gold medalist(s)	161	~~165~~	165	1st place, gold medalist(s)	300
2nd place, silver medalist(s)	Begis Kenesbayev (UZB)	B	~~126~~	126	129	2nd place, silver medalist(s)	155	160	164	2nd place, silver medalist(s)	293
3rd place, bronze medalist(s)	Husain Husain (BHR)	B	120	~~126~~	127	3rd place, bronze medalist(s)	156	161	~~166~~	3rd place, bronze medalist(s)	288
4	Mun Ik-hee (KOR)	B	120	125	~~127~~	4	155	~~160~~	~~162~~	5	280
5	Farukh Shokirzhanov (KGZ)	B	114	~~119~~	121	5	145	152	157	4	278
6	Abdullah Al-Ahmad (KSA)	B	114	~~118~~	~~121~~	6	~~142~~	142	148	6	262

=== 96 kg ===
Rank	Athlete	Group	Snatch (kg)				Clean & Jerk (kg)				Total
Rank	Athlete	Group	1	2	3	Rank	1	2	3	Rank	Total
1st place, gold medalist(s)	Abrorbek Marufbekov (UZB)	A	127	131	136	1st place, gold medalist(s)	157	163	~~167~~	1st place, gold medalist(s)	299
2nd place, silver medalist(s)	Surajbek Sapaýew (TKM)	A	~~130~~	130	135	3rd place, bronze medalist(s)	159	~~165~~	~~166~~	2nd place, silver medalist(s)	'294
3rd place, bronze medalist(s)	Sepah Amirhosein (IRI)	A	~~126~~	126	135	2nd place, silver medalist(s)	~~155~~	155	~~166~~	3rd place, bronze medalist(s)	290
4	Jawad Al-Shakhouri (KSA)	A	110	112	~~115~~	4	130	137	140	4	252
5	Uulu Ermek (KGZ)	A	102	107	111	5	133	136	~~140~~	5	247

=== 102 kg ===
Rank	Athlete	Group	Snatch (kg)				Clean & Jerk (kg)				Total
Rank	Athlete	Group	1	2	3	Rank	1	2	3	Rank	Total
1st place, gold medalist(s)	Nikita Abdrakhmanov (KAZ)	A	150	155	158	1st place, gold medalist(s)	180	191	196	1st place, gold medalist(s)	354
2nd place, silver medalist(s)	Kudratbek Salimjonov (UZB)	A	146	151	156	2nd place, silver medalist(s)	168	~~174~~	~~174~~	2nd place, silver medalist(s)	324
3rd place, bronze medalist(s)	Ali Ismail (SYR)	A	120	135	141	3rd place, bronze medalist(s)	150	161	~~165~~	3rd place, bronze medalist(s)	296
4	Oleg Sheptunov (KGZ)	A	103	107	~~110~~	4	127	133	~~136~~	4	240

=== +102 kg ===
Rank	Athlete	Group	Snatch (kg)				Clean & Jerk (kg)				Total
Rank	Athlete	Group	1	2	3	Rank	1	2	3	Rank	Total
1st place, gold medalist(s)	Taha Nematimoghaddam (IRI)	A	150	~~162~~	~~162~~	1st place, gold medalist(s)	180	190	~~200~~	1st place, gold medalist(s)	340
2nd place, silver medalist(s)	Nurbol Abdurashitov (UZB)	A	138	~~145~~	145	2nd place, silver medalist(s)	162	167	171	2nd place, silver medalist(s)	316
3rd place, bronze medalist(s)	Sanzhar Zholtay (KAZ)	A	~~132~~	132	136	4	163	170	~~172~~	3rd place, bronze medalist(s)	306
4	Jghili Kaswara (SYR)	A	~~130~~	133	137	3rd place, bronze medalist(s)	163	168	~~172~~	4	305
5	Muntathir Al-Mohsin (KSA)	A	~~100~~	100	108	5	125	133	141	5	249
6	Eldar Tolomushov (KGZ)	A	~~80~~	80	85	6	100	~~105~~	~~105~~	6	185

== Youth women's results ==
=== 40 kg ===
Rank	Athlete	Group	Snatch (kg)				Clean & Jerk (kg)				Total
Rank	Athlete	Group	1	2	3	Rank	1	2	3	Rank	Total
1st place, gold medalist(s)	Angeline Colonia (PHI)	A	57	60	62	1st place, gold medalist(s)	67	70	72	2nd place, silver medalist(s)	134
2nd place, silver medalist(s)	Dương Thị Kim Yến (VIE)	A	56	~~59~~	~~61~~	2nd place, silver medalist(s)	68	71	73	1st place, gold medalist(s)	129
3rd place, bronze medalist(s)	Akansha Kishor Vyavhare (IND)	A	~~53~~	53	55	3rd place, bronze medalist(s)	63	66	70	3rd place, bronze medalist(s)	125
4	Mansi Chamunda (IND)	A	50	~~53~~	53	4	60	64	67	4	120
5	Y Ngọc Thiết (VIE)	A	~~50~~	50	~~54~~	5	61	65	~~68~~	5	115

=== 45 kg ===
Rank	Athlete	Group	Snatch (kg)				Clean & Jerk (kg)				Total
Rank	Athlete	Group	1	2	3	Rank	1	2	3	Rank	Total
1st place, gold medalist(s)	Rose Jean Ramos (PHI)	A	65	67	70	1st place, gold medalist(s)	81	83	~~85~~	1st place, gold medalist(s)	153
2nd place, silver medalist(s)	Nguyễn Thị Hoài (VIE)	A	64	66	~~68~~	2nd place, silver medalist(s)	80	~~83~~	~~84~~	3rd place, bronze medalist(s)	146
3rd place, bronze medalist(s)	Soumya Dalvi (IND)	B	~~63~~	~~63~~	63	4	76	80	82	2nd place, silver medalist(s)	145
4	Ogulşat Amanowa (TKM)	B	~~58~~	58	~~60~~	5	73	75	77	4	135
5	Alexandra Belenko (KAZ)	B	53	56	58	6	68	74	~~77~~	5	132
6	Munisa Urokova (UZB)	B	~~50~~	50	53	7	60	64	~~68~~	6	117
—	Najla Khoirunnisa (INA)	A	~~64~~	65	~~68~~	3rd place, bronze medalist(s)	~~81~~	~~81~~	~~81~~	7	—

=== 49 kg ===
Rank	Athlete	Group	Snatch (kg)				Clean & Jerk (kg)				Total
Rank	Athlete	Group	1	2	3	Rank	1	2	3	Rank	Total
1st place, gold medalist(s)	Rosalinda Faustino (PHI)	B	66	69	71	1st place, gold medalist(s)	84	87	90	1st place, gold medalist(s)	161
2nd place, silver medalist(s)	Đỗ Thị Ngọc Anh (VIE)	A	~~67~~	67	69	2nd place, silver medalist(s)	75	83	~~86~~	4	152
3rd place, bronze medalist(s)	Thitaphon Tika (THA)	B	66	~~69~~	~~70~~	4	82	~~85~~	85	3rd place, bronze medalist(s)	151
4	Ziyoda Khudoykulova (UZB)	B	65	68	~~70~~	3rd place, bronze medalist(s)	74	~~78~~	~~78~~	5	142
5	Mutlaq Jear Rafif (KSA)	B	32	35	~~39~~	5	40	~~43~~	43	6	78
—	Darya Balabayuk (KAZ)	A	~~67~~	~~67~~	~~67~~	—	81	84	86	2nd place, silver medalist(s)	—

=== 55 kg ===
Rank	Athlete	Group	Snatch (kg)				Clean & Jerk (kg)				Total
Rank	Athlete	Group	1	2	3	Rank	1	2	3	Rank	Total
1st place, gold medalist(s)	Hoàng Kim Lụa (VIE)	B	72	75	77	1st place, gold medalist(s)	89	93	~~96~~	2nd place, silver medalist(s)	170
2nd place, silver medalist(s)	Nikita Kalamakar (IND)	B	65	68	~~71~~	4	92	95	~~97~~	1st place, gold medalist(s)	163
3rd place, bronze medalist(s)	Laylokhon Polvonnozirova (UZB)	B	68	70	~~73~~	2nd place, silver medalist(s)	85	91	~~94~~	3rd place, bronze medalist(s)	161
4	Hoàng Thị Kim Oanh (VIE)	B	69	~~71~~	~~71~~	3rd place, bronze medalist(s)	90	~~94~~	~~94~~	4	159
5	Kiesha Felisida (PHI)	B	~~62~~	62	66	5	80	84	~~87~~	5	150

=== 59 kg ===
Rank	Athlete	Group	Snatch (kg)				Clean & Jerk (kg)				Total
Rank	Athlete	Group	1	2	3	Rank	1	2	3	Rank	Total
1st place, gold medalist(s)	Sarah (INA)	A	83	86	88	1st place, gold medalist(s)	103	107	~~111~~	1st place, gold medalist(s)	195
2nd place, silver medalist(s)	Alina Koliushko (KAZ)	A	74	77	~~80~~	2nd place, silver medalist(s)	91	94	96	2nd place, silver medalist(s)	173
3rd place, bronze medalist(s)	Gülälek Kakamyradowa (TKM)	A	74	77	~~79~~	4	88	~~91~~	93	3rd place, bronze medalist(s)	170
4	Sitora Kupaysinova (UZB)	A	74	77	~~79~~	3rd place, bronze medalist(s)	91	~~95~~	~~95~~	4	168
5	Ankita (IND)	A	69	72	~~75~~	5	89	~~92~~	~~94~~	5	161

=== 64 kg ===
Rank	Athlete	Group	Snatch (kg)				Clean & Jerk (kg)				Total
Rank	Athlete	Group	1	2	3	Rank	1	2	3	Rank	Total
1st place, gold medalist(s)	Medine Amanowa (TKM)	A	~~81~~	82	85	1st place, gold medalist(s)	100	102	104	1st place, gold medalist(s)	189
2nd place, silver medalist(s)	Nadezhda Li (KAZ)	A	~~81~~	81	84	2nd place, silver medalist(s)	~~100~~	~~100~~	100	3rd place, bronze medalist(s)	184
3rd place, bronze medalist(s)	Mashkhura Rustamova (UZB)	A	74	78	~~84~~	3rd place, bronze medalist(s)	94	101	103	2nd place, silver medalist(s)	181
4	C Harshika (IND)	A	70	~~74~~	~~74~~	4	80	84	~~88~~	4	154

=== 71 kg ===
Rank	Athlete	Group	Snatch (kg)				Clean & Jerk (kg)				Total
Rank	Athlete	Group	1	2	3	Rank	1	2	3	Rank	Total
1st place, gold medalist(s)	Tugs-Erdene Otgonchimeg (MGL)	B	81	85	89	1st place, gold medalist(s)	101	108	~~112~~	1st place, gold medalist(s)	197
2nd place, silver medalist(s)	Aruzhan Dauletova (KAZ)	B	76	79	81	3rd place, bronze medalist(s)	96	~~99~~	99	3rd place, bronze medalist(s)	180
3rd place, bronze medalist(s)	Dilnoza Fayzullaeva (UZB)	B	76	80	82	2nd place, silver medalist(s)	94	97	~~101~~	4	179
4	Gulshoda Khon Dadamirzayeva (UZB)	B	70	73	76	4	97	100	~~105~~	2nd place, silver medalist(s)	176
5	Jyoti Yadav (IND)	B	~~67~~	67	~~70~~	5	76	80	~~83~~	5	147
6	Noor Yahya (BHR)	B	50	~~53~~	55	6	62	65	67	6	122
7	Nujud Khormi (KSA)	B	~~40~~	40	43	8	50	~~55~~	56	7	99
8	Layan Al-Qurashi (KSA)	B	35	40	43	7	48	53	55	8	98

=== 76 kg ===
Rank	Athlete	Group	Snatch (kg)				Clean & Jerk (kg)				Total
Rank	Athlete	Group	1	2	3	Rank	1	2	3	Rank	Total
1st place, gold medalist(s)	Madina Fullayeva (UZB)	A	75	78	82	1st place, gold medalist(s)	98	104	106	1st place, gold medalist(s)	188
2nd place, silver medalist(s)	Lkhagvajav Bolortuya (MGL)	A	67	74	77	2nd place, silver medalist(s)	~~97~~	97	~~103~~	2nd place, silver medalist(s)	174

=== 81 kg ===
Rank	Athlete	Group	Snatch (kg)				Clean & Jerk (kg)				Total
Rank	Athlete	Group	1	2	3	Rank	1	2	3	Rank	Total
1st place, gold medalist(s)	Nigora Suvonova (UZB)	A	89	93	95	1st place, gold medalist(s)	110	114	117	1st place, gold medalist(s)	212
2nd place, silver medalist(s)	Anamjan Rustamowa (TKM)	A	88	~~91~~	~~92~~	2nd place, silver medalist(s)	105	109	113	2nd place, silver medalist(s)	201
3rd place, bronze medalist(s)	Pallimakkal Amritha (IND)	A	69	72	74	3rd place, bronze medalist(s)	86	89	94	3rd place, bronze medalist(s)	168
4	Y. Chatina Kumari (IND)	A	70	~~73~~	73	4	80	84	86	4	159

=== +81 kg ===
Rank	Athlete	Group	Snatch (kg)				Clean & Jerk (kg)				Total
Rank	Athlete	Group	1	2	3	Rank	1	2	3	Rank	Total
1st place, gold medalist(s)	Trần Thị Hiền (VIE)	A	86	95	100	1st place, gold medalist(s)	115	125	~~130~~	1st place, gold medalist(s)	225
2nd place, silver medalist(s)	Martina Maibam (IND)	A	80	83	85	2nd place, silver medalist(s)	99	103	105	2nd place, silver medalist(s)	190
3rd place, bronze medalist(s)	Xushnova Xalikova (UZB)	A	70	75	81	3rd place, bronze medalist(s)	95	100	104	3rd place, bronze medalist(s)	185
4	Sohayba Rahman Rafa (BAN)	A	~~60~~	60	63	4	75	79	~~83~~	4	142
