= Amanda Schott =

Brazilian weightlifter (born 1996)

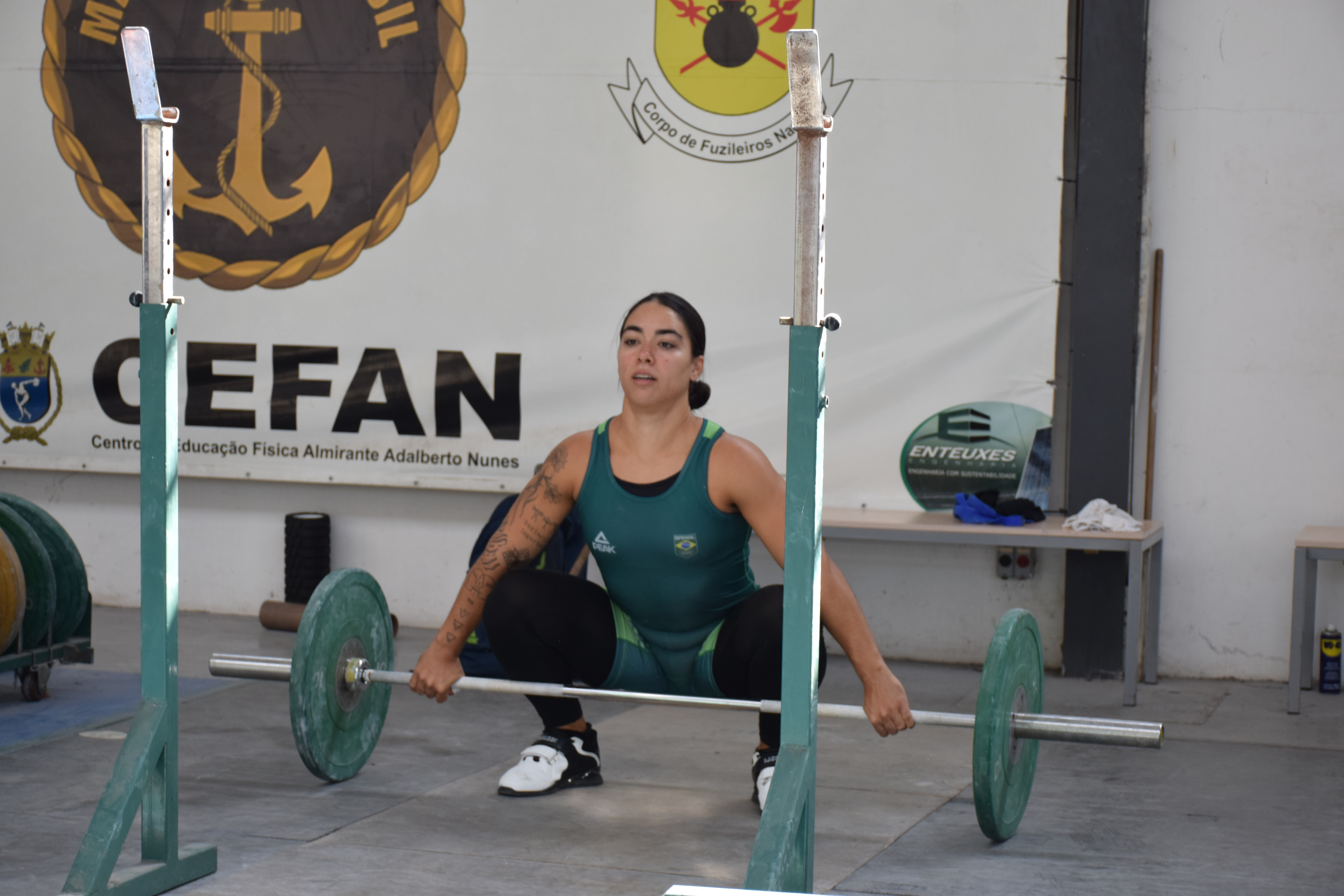

Personal information
- Born: 24 September 1996 (age 29)

Sport
- Country: Brazil
- Sport: Weightlifting
- Weight class: 71 kg
Medal record
Women's weightlifting
Representing Brazil
World Championships
Bronze medal – third place	2021 Tashkent	Snatch-87 kg
Pan American Championships
Bronze medal – third place	2021 Guayaquil	81 kg
South American Games
Bronze medal – third place	2022 Asunción	76 kg

Amanda da Costa Schott (born 24 September 1996) is a Brazilian weightlifter. She won the bronze medal in the women's 81 kg event at the 2021 Pan American Weightlifting Championships held in Guayaquil, Ecuador. She represented Brazil at the 2024 Summer Olympics in Paris, France.

== Career ==
She won the bronze medal in the women's 87 kg Snatch event at the 2021 World Weightlifting Championships held in Tashkent, Uzbekistan. She won the bronze medal in the women's 81 kg event at the 2021 Pan American Weightlifting Championships held in Guayaquil, Ecuador.

Schott competed at the 2022 Pan American Weightlifting Championships held in Bogotá, Colombia. A few months later, she won the bronze medal in the women's 76 kg event at the 2022 South American Games held in Asunción, Paraguay.

She competed in the women's 71 kg event at the 2023 Pan American Games held in Santiago, Chile. In 2024, Schott competed in the women's 71 kg event at the 2024 Summer Olympics held in Paris, France. She lifted 229 kg in total and placed eighth.

== Achievements ==
Year	Venue	Weight	Snatch (kg)				Clean & Jerk (kg)				Total	Rank
Year	Venue	Weight	1	2	3	Rank	1	2	3	Rank	Total	Rank
Olympic Games
2024	Paris, France	71 kg	100	104	106	—N/a	~~117~~	123	~~131~~	—N/a	229	8
World Championships
2021	Tashkent, Uzbekistan	87 kg	102	106	~~109~~	3rd place, bronze medalist(s)	123	~~130~~	130	5	236	5
2022	Bogotá, Colombia	71 kg	100	103	~~104~~	11	~~122~~	~~123~~	125	11	228	11
Pan American Games
2023	Santiago, Chile	71 kg	~~105~~	~~105~~	~~107~~	—N/a	—	—	—	—N/a	—	—
Pan American Championships
2021	Guayaquil, Ecuador	81 kg	~~100~~	100	105	3rd place, bronze medalist(s)	121	~~126~~	~~129~~	3rd place, bronze medalist(s)	226	3rd place, bronze medalist(s)
2022	Bogotá, Colombia	71 kg	90	~~95~~	~~98~~	9	110	115	120	7	210	9
2023	Bariloche, Argentina	71 kg	101	~~105~~	~~105~~	7	123	~~128~~	~~128~~	8	224	7
2024	Caracas, Venezuela	71 kg	102	105	~~108~~	3rd place, bronze medalist(s)	~~127~~	~~129~~	—	—	—	—
South American Games
2022	Asunción, Paraguay	76 kg	95	100	102	—N/a	120	125	131	—N/a	233	3rd place, bronze medalist(s)
