= Rose Jean Ramos =

Filipino weightlifter (born 2005)

Rose Jean Amis Ramos
Personal information
- Nationality: Filipino
- Born: 6 November 2005 (age 20) Zamboanga City, Philippines

Sport
- Country: Philippines
- Sport: Weightlifting
- Event: 45 kg

Achievements and titles
- Personal bests: Snatch: 73 kg (2023); Clean and jerk: 88 kg (2023); Total: 161 kg (2023, NR)
Medal record
Women's weightlifting
Representing the Philippines
Event	1st	2nd	3rd
Asian Championships	0	1	0
Asian Junior Championships	1	2	0
Youth World Championships	2	0	0
Asian Youth Championships	1	0	0
Total	4	3	0
Asian Championships
Silver medal – second place	2023 Jinju	-45 kg
Asian Junior Championships
Gold medal – first place	2023 Delhi	–45 kg
Silver medal – second place	2022 Tashkent	–45 kg
Silver medal – second place	2024 Doha	-45 kg
Youth World Championships
Gold medal – first place	2021 Jeddah	–45 kg
Gold medal – first place	2022 León	–45 kg
Asian Youth Championships
Gold medal – first place	2022 Tashkent	–45 kg

Rose Jean Amis Ramos (born 6 November 2005) is a Filipina weightlifter, competing in the women's 45 kg category.

== Career ==
Ramos's career started off with national championships such as the Batang Pinoy and Palarong Pambansa where she won the women's 32 kg category.

She branched off to international competitions such as the 2021 Youth World Weightlifting Championships where she placed first in the women's 45 kg category with a 147 kg total. The following year she participated at the 2022 Youth World Weightlifting Championships and defended her title placing first in the women's 45 kg category, as well as participating at the 2022 Asian Junior & Youth Weightlifting Championships where she won gold in the youth 45 kg category and silver in the junior 45 kg category.

In the same year, she competed in her first international senior competition at the 2022 Asian Weightlifting Championships where she was one of two athletes from the Philippines, winning a bronze in the clean and jerk with 85 kg on the bar and placing fourth in the total.

The following year, she competed again in the Asian Championships in the 2023 edition winning the silver medal in the women's 45 kg category for her first international senior medal.

== Personal life ==
Ramos's family comes from a line of weightlifters. With sister Rosegie Ramos who is a Southeast Asian Games bronze medalist and cousin Hidilyn Diaz who is an Olympic and world champion are also weightlifters.

== Major results ==
Year	Venue	Weight	Snatch (kg)				Clean & Jerk (kg)				Total	Rank
Year	Venue	Weight	1	2	3	Rank	1	2	3	Rank	Total	Rank
Asian Championships
2022	Manama, Bahrain	45 kg	67	~~70~~	~~70~~	4	82	85	~~87~~	3rd place, bronze medalist(s)	152	4
2023	Jinju, South Korea	45 kg	70	73	~~75~~	2nd place, silver medalist(s)	85	88	~~90~~	2nd place, silver medalist(s)	161	2nd place, silver medalist(s)
Asian Junior Championships
2022	Tashkent, Uzbekistan	45 kg	65	67	70	1st place, gold medalist(s)	81	83	~~85~~	3rd place, bronze medalist(s)	153	2nd place, silver medalist(s)
2023	Delhi, India	45 kg	~~70~~	70	~~72~~	2nd place, silver medalist(s)	85	87	~~89~~	2nd place, silver medalist(s)	157	1st place, gold medalist(s)
2024	Doha, Qatar	45 kg	68	71	73	2nd place, silver medalist(s)	81	~~85~~	~~85~~	7	154	4
Youth World Championships
2021	Jeddah, Saudi Arabia	45 kg	63	65	67	1st place, gold medalist(s)	78	80	~~82~~	2nd place, silver medalist(s)	147	1st place, gold medalist(s)
2022	León, Mexico	45 kg	65	68	70	2nd place, silver medalist(s)	80	82	85	1st place, gold medalist(s)	155	1st place, gold medalist(s)
Asian Youth Championships
2022	Tashkent, Uzbekistan	45 kg	65	67	70	1st place, gold medalist(s)	81	83	~~85~~	1st place, gold medalist(s)	153	1st place, gold medalist(s)
