= List of youth world records in Olympic weightlifting =

The following are the youth world records in Olympic weightlifting. They are the best results set in competition by athletes aged 13 to 17 throughout the entire calendar year of the performance. Records are maintained in each weight class for the snatch, clean and jerk, and the total for both by the International Weightlifting Federation (IWF).

== Current records ==
Key to tables: Awaiting ratification Not ratified or later rescinded by IWF

=== Men ===
Event	Record	Athlete	Nation	Date	Meet	Place	Age	Ref
55 kg
Snatch	110 kg	World Standard						
Clean & Jerk	138 kg	Mohammed Al-Ojaian	Saudi Arabia	7 August 2026	Asian Youth Championships	Tashkent, Uzbekistan	17 years, 48 days	
Total	247 kg	Mohammed Al-Ojaian	Saudi Arabia	7 August 2026	Asian Youth Championships	Tashkent, Uzbekistan	17 years, 48 days	
60 kg
Snatch	121 kg	World Standard						
Clean & Jerk	149 kg	World Standard						
Total	267 kg	World Standard						
65 kg
Snatch	131 kg	Beibarys Yerseit	Kazakhstan	3 May 2026	World Junior Championships	Ismailia, Egypt	17 years, 66 days	
Clean & Jerk	166 kg	Nguyễn Thành Duy	Vietnam	28 October 2026	World Championships	Ningbo, China	17 years, 244 days	
Total	296 kg	Nguyễn Thành Duy	Vietnam	28 October 2026	World Championships	Ningbo, China	17 years, 244 days	
70 kg
Snatch	137 kg	World Standard						
Clean & Jerk	164 kg	World Standard						
Total	298 kg	World Standard						
75 kg
Snatch	145 kg	Mohammad Javad Beyralvand	Iran	11 August 2026	Asian Youth Championships	Tashkent, Uzbekistan	16 years, 289 days	
Clean & Jerk	180 kg	Mohammad Javad Beyralvand	Iran	11 August 2026	Asian Youth Championships	Tashkent, Uzbekistan	16 years, 289 days	
Total	325 kg	Mohammad Javad Beyralvand	Iran	11 August 2026	Asian Youth Championships	Tashkent, Uzbekistan	16 years, 289 days	
85 kg
Snatch	155 kg	World Standard						
Clean & Jerk	187 kg	Ali Abdelradi	Egypt	11 October 2026	African Youth Championships	Mostaganem, Algeria	17 years, 241 days	
Total	339 kg	Ali Abdelradi	Egypt	11 October 2026	African Youth Championships	Mostaganem, Algeria	17 years, 241 days	
95 kg
Snatch	163 kg	Erik Guadamud	Spain	4 November 2026	World Championships	Ningbo, China	16 years, 201 days	
Clean & Jerk	197 kg	World Standard						
Total	359 kg	World Standard						
+95 kg
Snatch	176 kg	Taha Nojavan	Iran	13 August 2026	Asian Youth Championships	Tashkent, Uzbekistan	16 years, 86 days	
Clean & Jerk	215 kg	Taha Nojavan	Iran	13 August 2026	Asian Youth Championships	Tashkent, Uzbekistan	16 years, 86 days	
Total	391 kg	Taha Nojavan	Iran	13 August 2026	Asian Youth Championships	Tashkent, Uzbekistan	16 years, 86 days	

=== Women ===
Event	Record	Athlete	Nation	Date	Meet	Place	Age	Ref
45 kg
Snatch	74 kg	World Standard						
Clean & Jerk	94 kg	Aurora van Ulft	Aruba	26 August 2026	Pan American Youth Championships	Guayaquil, Ecuador	13 years, 202 days	
Total	166 kg	Aurora van Ulft	Aruba	26 August 2026	Pan American Youth Championships	Guayaquil, Ecuador	13 years, 202 days	
49 kg
Snatch	81 kg	Enderlin Ulacio	Venezuela	4 October 2026	Pan American Junior Championships	Tepic, Mexico	17 years, 38 days	
Clean & Jerk	100 kg	Enderlin Ulacio	Venezuela	4 October 2026	Pan American Junior Championships	Tepic, Mexico	17 years, 38 days	
Total	181 kg	Enderlin Ulacio	Venezuela	4 October 2026	Pan American Junior Championships	Tepic, Mexico	17 years, 38 days	
53 kg
Snatch	88 kg	Pak Hae-yon	North Korea	28 October 2025	Asian Youth Games	Sakhir, Bahrain	16 years, 86 days	
Clean & Jerk	107 kg	Pak Hae-yon	North Korea	28 October 2025	Asian Youth Games	Sakhir, Bahrain	16 years, 86 days	
Total	195 kg	Pak Hae-yon	North Korea	28 October 2025	Asian Youth Games	Sakhir, Bahrain	16 years, 86 days	
57 kg
Snatch	89 kg	Şabnam Kerimbaýewa	Turkmenistan	30 October 2026	World Championships	Ningbo, China	16 years, 308 days	
Clean & Jerk	112 kg	Snezhana Kashkarova	Kazakhstan	10 August 2026	Asian Youth Championships	Tashkent, Uzbekistan	15 years, 8 days	
Total	201 kg	Şabnam Kerimbaýewa	Turkmenistan	30 October 2026	World Championships	Ningbo, China	16 years, 308 days	
61 kg
Snatch	95 kg	Femily-Crystie Notte	Nauru	1 November 2026	World Championships	Ningbo, China	17 years, 190 days	
Clean & Jerk	115 kg	World Standard						
Total	206 kg	World Standard						
69 kg
Snatch	106 kg	Emily Ibanez	Kosovo	3 November 2026	World Championships	Ningbo, China	15 years, 311 days	
Clean & Jerk	134 kg	Emily Ibanez	Kosovo	3 November 2026	World Championships	Ningbo, China	15 years, 311 days	
Total	240 kg	Emily Ibanez	Kosovo	3 November 2026	World Championships	Ningbo, China	15 years, 311 days	
77 kg
Snatch	106 kg	World Standard						
Clean & Jerk	133 kg	World Standard						
Total	237 kg	World Standard						
+77 kg
Snatch	125 kg	Hu Wenxun	China	8 May 2026	World Junior Championships	Ismailia, Egypt	15 years, 197 days	
Clean & Jerk	163 kg	Hu Wenxun	China	8 May 2026	World Junior Championships	Ismailia, Egypt	15 years, 197 days	
Total	288 kg	Hu Wenxun	China	8 May 2026	World Junior Championships	Ismailia, Egypt	15 years, 197 days	

== Historical records ==
=== Men (2025–2026) ===
Event	Record	Athlete	Nation	Date	Meet	Place	Age	Ref
56 kg
Snatch	114 kg	Mohammed Al-Ojaian	Saudi Arabia	5 July 2026	World Youth Championships	Cali, Colombia	17 years, 15 days	
Clean & Jerk	141 kg	World Standard						
Total	253 kg	Mohammed Al-Ojaian	Saudi Arabia	5 July 2026	World Youth Championships	Cali, Colombia	17 years, 15 days	
71 kg
Snatch	144 kg	Alikhan Askerbay	Kazakhstan	27 October 2025	Asian Youth Games	Sakhir, Bahrain	17 years, 184 days	
Clean & Jerk	172 kg	Alikhan Askerbay	Kazakhstan	27 October 2025	Asian Youth Games	Sakhir, Bahrain	17 years, 184 days	
Total	316 kg	Alikhan Askerbay	Kazakhstan	27 October 2025	Asian Youth Games	Sakhir, Bahrain	17 years, 184 days	
79 kg
Snatch	151 kg	Ali Abdelradi	Egypt	5 May 2026	World Junior Championships	Ismailia, Egypt	17 years, 82 days	
Clean & Jerk	182 kg	Ali Abdelradi	Egypt	5 May 2026	World Junior Championships	Ismailia, Egypt	17 years, 82 days	
Total	333 kg	Ali Abdelradi	Egypt	5 May 2026	World Junior Championships	Ismailia, Egypt	17 years, 82 days	
88 kg
Snatch	160 kg	World Standard						
Clean & Jerk	193 kg	Nurzhan Zhumabay	Kazakhstan	10 July 2026	World Youth Championships	Cali, Colombia	15 years, 278 days	
Total	349 kg	World Standard						
94 kg
Snatch	164 kg	World Standard						
Clean & Jerk	199 kg	World Standard						
Total	361 kg	World Standard						
+94 kg
Snatch	169 kg	World Standard						
Clean & Jerk	218 kg	World Standard						
Total	382 kg	World Standard						

=== Men (2018–2025) ===
Event	Record	Athlete	Nation	Date	Meet	Place	Age	Ref
49 kg
Snatch	100 kg	Pak Myong-jin	North Korea	21 October 2019	Asian Youth & Junior Championships	Pyongyang, North Korea	16 years, 202 days	
Clean & Jerk	125 kg	Đỗ Tú Tùng	Vietnam	8 March 2019	Youth World Championships	Las Vegas, United States	15 years, 57 days	
Total	221 kg	Pak Myong-jin	North Korea	21 October 2019	Asian Youth & Junior Championships	Pyongyang, North Korea	16 years, 202 days	
55 kg
Snatch	116 kg	K'Dương	Vietnam	20 December 2024	Asian Youth Championships	Doha, Qatar	17 years, 170 days	
Clean & Jerk	146 kg	K'Dương	Vietnam	20 December 2024	Asian Youth Championships	Doha, Qatar	17 years, 170 days	
Total	262 kg	K'Dương	Vietnam	20 December 2024	Asian Youth Championships	Doha, Qatar	17 years, 170 days	
61 kg
Snatch	123 kg	Kaan Kahriman	Turkey	6 October 2021	Youth World Championships	Jeddah, Saudi Arabia	17 years, 24 days	
Clean & Jerk	156 kg	Hampton Morris	United States	6 October 2021	Youth World Championships	Jeddah, Saudi Arabia	17 years, 231 days	
Total	276 kg	Hampton Morris	United States	6 October 2021	Youth World Championships	Jeddah, Saudi Arabia	17 years, 231 days	
67 kg
Snatch	140 kg	Jeremy Lalrinnunga	India	20 December 2019	Qatar Cup	Doha, Qatar	17 years, 55 days	
Clean & Jerk	166 kg	Jeremy Lalrinnunga	India	20 December 2019	Qatar Cup	Doha, Qatar	17 years, 55 days	
Total	306 kg	Jeremy Lalrinnunga	India	20 December 2019	Qatar Cup	Doha, Qatar	17 years, 55 days	
73 kg
Snatch	144 kg	Mohammed Al-Marzouq	Saudi Arabia	22 September 2024	World Junior Championships	León, Spain	16 years, 363 days	
Clean & Jerk	175 kg	Akzhol Kurmanbek	Kazakhstan	23 December 2024	Asian Youth Championships	Doha, Qatar	17 years, 16 days	
Total	316 kg	Akzhol Kurmanbek	Kazakhstan	23 December 2024	Asian Youth Championships	Doha, Qatar	17 years, 16 days	
81 kg
Snatch	166 kg	Karlos Nasar	Bulgaria	12 December 2021	World Championships	Tashkent, Uzbekistan	17 years, 214 days	
Clean & Jerk	208 kg	Karlos Nasar	Bulgaria	12 December 2021	World Championships	Tashkent, Uzbekistan	17 years, 214 days	
Total	374 kg	Karlos Nasar	Bulgaria	12 December 2021	World Championships	Tashkent, Uzbekistan	17 years, 214 days	
89 kg
Snatch	165 kg	Siarhei Sharankou	Belarus	13 December 2019	European Youth Championships	Eilat, Israel	17 years, 181 days	
Clean & Jerk	194 kg	Bekzod Gofirjonov	Uzbekistan	23 December 2024	Asian Youth Championships	Doha, Qatar	17 years, 329 days	
Total	357 kg	Siarhei Sharankou	Belarus	13 December 2019	European Youth Championships	Eilat, Israel	17 years, 181 days	
96 kg
Snatch	162 kg	Artur Babayan	Russia	13 December 2019	European Youth Championships	Eilat, Israel	17 years, 157 days	
Clean & Jerk	196 kg	Rakhat Bekbolat	Kazakhstan	26 October 2019	Asian Youth & Junior Championships	Pyongyang, North Korea	15 years, 285 days	
Total	354 kg	Artur Babayan	Russia	25 October 2019	European Junior Championships	Bucharest, Romania	17 years, 108 days	
102 kg
Snatch	176 kg	Bohdan Hoza	Ukraine	14 December 2019	European Youth Championships	Eilat, Israel	17 years, 336 days	
Clean & Jerk	213 kg	Rakhat Bekbolat	Kazakhstan	24 April 2021	Asian Championships	Tashkent, Uzbekistan	17 years, 100 days	
Total	386 kg	Rakhat Bekbolat	Kazakhstan	24 April 2021	Asian Championships	Tashkent, Uzbekistan	17 years, 100 days	
+102 kg
Snatch	176 kg	Taha Nemati	Iran	23 November 2023	Junior World Championships	Guadalajara, Mexico	17 years, 297 days	
Clean & Jerk	225 kg	Alireza Yousefi	Iran	8 June 2019	Junior World Championships	Suva, Fiji	15 years, 285 days	
Total	396 kg	Alireza Yousefi	Iran	8 June 2019	Junior World Championships	Suva, Fiji	15 years, 285 days	

=== Men (1998–2018) ===
Event	Record	Athlete	Nation	Date	Meet	Place	Age	Ref
50 kg
Snatch	102 kg	Zheng Liangrun	China	4 March 2014	Asian Youth Championships	Bang Saen, Thailand	16 years, 121 days	
Clean & Jerk	128 kg	Đỗ Tú Tùng	Vietnam	23 April 2018	Asian Youth Championships	Urgench, Uzbekistan	14 years, 103 days	
Total	227 kg	Sinphet Kruaithong	Thailand	5 September 2011	Asian Youth Championships	Pattaya, Thailand	16 years, 14 days	
56 kg
Snatch	128 kg	Meng Cheng	China	4 March 2014	Asian Youth Championships	Bang Saen, Thailand	16 years, 136 days	
Clean & Jerk	162 kg	Zhang Xiangxiang	China	16 September 2000	Olympic Games	Sydney, Australia	17 years, 62 days	
Total	287 kg	Zhang Xiangxiang	China	16 September 2000	Olympic Games	Sydney, Australia	17 years, 62 days	
62 kg
Snatch	140 kg	Wu Chao	China	4 November 2008	Asian Interclub Championships	Goyang, South Korea	16 years, 290 days	
Clean & Jerk	165 kg	Chen Lijun	China	15 June 2010	World Junior Championships	Sofia, Bulgaria	17 years, 127 days	
Total	300 kg	Wu Chao	China	4 November 2008	Asian Interclub Championships	Goyang, South Korea	16 years, 290 days	
69 kg
Snatch	147 kg	Taner Sağır	Turkey	31 May 2002	Junior World Championships	Havířov, Czech Republic	17 years, 79 days	
Clean & Jerk	185 kg	Clarence Cummings	United States	7 April 2017	Youth World Championships	Bangkok, Thailand	16 years, 305 days	
Total	322 kg	Taner Sağır	Turkey	31 May 2002	Junior World Championships	Havířov, Czech Republic	17 years, 79 days	
77 kg
Snatch	160 kg	Yeison López	Colombia	23 October 2016	Youth World Championships	Penang, Malaysia	17 years, 288 days	
Clean & Jerk	193 kg	Harrison Maurus	United States	2 December 2017	World Championships	Anaheim, United States	17 years, 279 days	
Total	351 kg	Yeison López	Colombia	23 October 2016	Youth World Championships	Penang, Malaysia	17 years, 288 days	
85 kg
Snatch	170 kg	Ilya Ilin	Kazakhstan	14 November 2005	World Championships	Doha, Qatar	17 years, 174 days	
Clean & Jerk	216 kg	Ilya Ilin	Kazakhstan	14 November 2005	World Championships	Doha, Qatar	17 years, 174 days	
Total	386 kg	Ilya Ilin	Kazakhstan	14 November 2005	World Championships	Doha, Qatar	17 years, 174 days	
94 kg
Snatch	174 kg	Aleksey Kosov	Russia	17 December 2011	President's Cup	Belgorod, Russia	17 years, 141 days	
Clean & Jerk	218 kg	Szymon Kołecki	Poland	14 November 1998	World Championships	Lahti, Finland	17 years, 33 days	
Total	385 kg	Szymon Kołecki	Poland	14 November 1998	World Championships	Lahti, Finland	17 years, 33 days	
+94 kg
Snatch	184 kg	Simon Martirosyan	Armenia	28 November 2014	European Junior Championships	Limassol, Cyprus	17 years, 284 days	
Clean & Jerk	221 kg	Simon Martirosyan	Armenia	23 August 2014	Youth Olympic Games	Nanjing, China	17 years, 187 days	
Total	397 kg	Simon Martirosyan	Armenia	3 May 2014	European Youth Championships	Ciechanów, Poland	17 years, 75 days	

=== Women (2025–2026) ===
Event	Record	Athlete	Nation	Date	Meet	Place	Age	Ref
44 kg
Snatch	72 kg	World Standard						
Clean & Jerk	93 kg	Aurora van Ulft	Aruba	5 July 2026	World Youth Championships	Cali, Colombia	13 years, 150 days	
Total	162 kg	Aurora van Ulft	Aruba	5 July 2026	World Youth Championships	Cali, Colombia	13 years, 150 days	
48 kg
Snatch	78 kg	World Standard						
Clean & Jerk	98 kg	Alexsandra Diaz	Philippines	5 July 2026	World Youth Championships	Cali, Colombia	15 years, 211 days	
Total	175 kg	Alexsandra Diaz	Philippines	5 July 2026	World Youth Championships	Cali, Colombia	15 years, 211 days	
58 kg
Snatch	91 kg	Nicoleta Cojocaru	Moldova	3 May 2026	World Junior Championships	Ismailia, Egypt	16 years, 179 days	
Clean & Jerk	114 kg	Nicoleta Cojocaru	Moldova	7 July 2026	World Youth Championships	Cali, Colombia	16 years, 244 days	
Total	202 kg	Nicoleta Cojocaru	Moldova	7 July 2026	World Youth Championships	Cali, Colombia	16 years, 244 days	
63 kg
Snatch	101 kg	Femily-Crystie Notte	Nauru	29 April 2026	Oceania Championships	Apia, Samoa	17 years, 4 days	
Clean & Jerk	123 kg	Femily-Crystie Notte	Nauru	29 April 2026	Oceania Championships	Apia, Samoa	17 years, 4 days	
Total	224 kg	Femily-Crystie Notte	Nauru	29 April 2026	Oceania Championships	Apia, Samoa	17 years, 4 days	

=== Women (2018–2025) ===
Event	Record	Athlete	Nation	Date	Meet	Place	Age	Ref
40 kg
Snatch	62 kg	Angeline Colonia	Philippines	17 July 2022	Asian Youth & Junior Championships	Tashkent, Uzbekistan	16 years, 56 days	
Clean & Jerk	77 kg	Isanelly Da Silva	Brazil	30 April 2025	World Youth Championships	Lima, Peru	14 years, 187 days	
Total	135 kg	World Standard						
45 kg
Snatch	77 kg	Paek Hye-jong	North Korea	21 October 2019	Asian Youth & Junior Championships	Pyongyang, North Korea	16 years, 218 days	
Clean & Jerk	95 kg	Paek Hye-jong	North Korea	21 October 2019	Asian Youth & Junior Championships	Pyongyang, North Korea	16 years, 218 days	
Total	172 kg	Paek Hye-jong	North Korea	21 October 2019	Asian Youth & Junior Championships	Pyongyang, North Korea	16 years, 218 days	
49 kg
Snatch	86 kg	Windy Cantika Aisah	Indonesia	2 December 2019	Southeast Asian Games	Manila, Philippines	17 years, 174 days	
Clean & Jerk	104 kg	Windy Cantika Aisah	Indonesia	2 December 2019	Southeast Asian Games	Manila, Philippines	17 years, 174 days	
Total	190 kg	Windy Cantika Aisah	Indonesia	2 December 2019	Southeast Asian Games	Manila, Philippines	17 years, 174 days	
55 kg
Snatch	89 kg	Katharine Estep	United States	7 October 2021	Youth World Championships	Jeddah, Saudi Arabia	17 years, 50 days	
Clean & Jerk	110 kg	Pak Jin-hae	North Korea	23 October 2019	Asian Youth & Junior Championships	Pyongyang, North Korea	15 years, 349 days	
Total	198 kg	Katharine Estep	United States	7 October 2021	Youth World Championships	Jeddah, Saudi Arabia	17 years, 50 days	
59 kg
Snatch	99 kg	Kim Il-gyong	North Korea	23 October 2019	Asian Youth & Junior Championships	Pyongyang, North Korea	16 years, 88 days	
Clean & Jerk	129 kg	Kim Il-gyong	North Korea	23 October 2019	Asian Youth & Junior Championships	Pyongyang, North Korea	16 years, 88 days	
Total	228 kg	Kim Il-gyong	North Korea	23 October 2019	Asian Youth & Junior Championships	Pyongyang, North Korea	16 years, 88 days	
64 kg
Snatch	105 kg	Pei Xinyi	China	10 December 2022	World Championships	Bogotá, Colombia	17 years, 70 days	
Clean & Jerk	128 kg	Pei Xinyi	China	10 December 2022	World Championships	Bogotá, Colombia	17 years, 70 days	
Total	233 kg	Pei Xinyi	China	10 December 2022	World Championships	Bogotá, Colombia	17 years, 70 days	
71 kg
Snatch	103 kg	Zarina Gusalova	Russia	9 October 2021	Youth World Championships	Jeddah, Saudi Arabia	17 years, 273 days	
Clean & Jerk	131 kg	Lin Jingwei	China	3 May 2025	World Youth Championships	Lima, Peru	17 years, 98 days	
Total	231 kg	Lin Jingwei	China	3 May 2025	World Youth Championships	Lima, Peru	17 years, 98 days	
76 kg
Snatch	108 kg	Varvara Kuzminova	AIN	3 May 2025	World Youth Championships	Lima, Peru	16 years, 299 days	
Clean & Jerk	130 kg	Dilara Narin	Turkey	23 October 2019	European Junior Championships	Bucharest, Romania	17 years, 220 days	
Total	235 kg	Varvara Kuzminova	AIN	3 May 2025	World Youth Championships	Lima, Peru	16 years, 299 days	
81 kg
Snatch	106 kg	World Standard						
Clean & Jerk	135 kg	Wakana Nagashima	Japan	10 May 2023	Asian Championships	Jinju, South Korea	17 years, 88 days	
Total	236 kg	Wakana Nagashima	Japan	12 December 2023	IWF Grand Prix	Doha, Qatar	17 years, 304 days	
+81 kg
Snatch	110 kg	Park Hye-jeong	South Korea	27 October 2019	Asian Youth & Junior Championships	Pyongyang, North Korea	16 years, 229 days	
Clean & Jerk	146 kg	Etta Love	Canada	27 September 2024	World Junior Championships	León, Spain	17 years, 30 days	
Total	255 kg	Park Hye-jeong	South Korea	27 October 2019	Asian Youth & Junior Championships	Pyongyang, North Korea	16 years, 229 days	

=== Women (1998–2018) ===
Event	Record	Athlete	Nation	Date	Meet	Place	Age	Ref
44 kg
Snatch	77 kg	Şaziye Okur	Turkey	8 September 2009	European Youth Championships	Eilat, Israel	17 years, 197 days	
Clean & Jerk	93 kg	Ri Song-gum	North Korea	4 March 2014	Asian Youth Championships	Bang Saen, Thailand	16 years, 138 days	
Total	169 kg	Şaziye Okur	Turkey	8 September 2009	European Youth Championships	Eilat, Israel	17 years, 197 days	
48 kg
Snatch	92 kg	Wang Mingjuan	China	19 November 2002	World Championships	Warsaw, Poland	17 years, 39 days	
Clean & Jerk	116 kg	Tian Yuan	China	17 September 2010	World Championships	Antalya, Turkey	17 years, 231 days	
Total	207 kg	Wang Mingjuan	China	19 November 2002	World Championships	Warsaw, Poland	17 years, 39 days	
53 kg
Snatch	98 kg	Li Ping	China	10 November 2005	World Championships	Doha, Qatar	17 years, 56 days	
Clean & Jerk	129 kg	Zulfiya Chinshanlo	Kazakhstan	22 November 2009	World Championships	Goyang, South Korea	16 years, 120 days	
Total	224 kg	Li Ping	China	10 November 2005	World Championships	Doha, Qatar	17 years, 56 days	
58 kg
Snatch	110 kg	Deng Wei	China	17 August 2010	Youth Olympic Games	Singapore	17 years, 184 days	
Clean & Jerk	135 kg	Deng Wei	China	19 September 2010	World Championships	Antalya, Turkey	17 years, 217 days	
Total	242 kg	Deng Wei	China	17 August 2010	Youth Olympic Games	Singapore	17 years, 184 days	
63 kg
Snatch	107 kg	Viktoria Savenko	Russia	21 May 2005	World Junior Championships	Busan, South Korea	16 years, 358 days	
Clean & Jerk	128 kg	Viktoria Savenko	Russia	21 May 2005	World Junior Championships	Busan, South Korea	16 years, 358 days	
Total	235 kg	Viktoria Savenko	Russia	21 May 2005	World Junior Championships	Busan, South Korea	16 years, 358 days	
69 kg
Snatch	117 kg	Zarema Kasayeva	Russia	19 August 2004	Olympic Games	Athens, Greece	17 years, 176 days	
Clean & Jerk	148 kg	Liu Chunhong	China	6 October 2002	Asian Games	Busan, South Korea	17 years, 250 days	
Total	262 kg	Liu Chunhong	China	6 October 2002	Asian Games	Busan, South Korea	17 years, 250 days	
75 kg
Snatch	112 kg	Olga Zubova	Russia	14 August 2010	Youth Olympic Games	Singapore	16 years, 248 days	
Clean & Jerk	142 kg	Abeer Abdelrahman	Egypt	19 November 2009	World Championships	Goyang, South Korea	17 years, 159 days	
Total	252 kg	Abeer Abdelrahman	Egypt	19 November 2009	World Championships	Goyang, South Korea	17 years, 159 days	
+75 kg
Snatch	125 kg	Cheryl Haworth	United States	22 September 2000	Olympic Games	Sydney, Australia	17 years, 156 days	
Clean & Jerk	151 kg	Nadezhda Nogay	Kazakhstan	14 May 2011	World Youth Championships	Lima, Peru	14 years, 359 days	
Total	272 kg	Nadezhda Nogay	Kazakhstan	14 May 2011	World Youth Championships	Lima, Peru	14 years, 359 days	
