= Yekta Jamali =

Iranian weightlifter

Personal information
- Native name: یکتا جمالی
- Full name: Yekta Jamali Galeh
- Nationality: Iran
- Born: December 16, 2004 (age 21) Sedeh Lenjan, Isfahan Province, Iran
- Weight: 85.85 kg (189.3 lb)

Sport
- Sport: Weightlifting
- Event: 87 kg
- Club: AC 1892 Mutterstadt

Achievements and titles
- Personal bests: Snatch: 100 kg (2021); Clean & Jerk: 122 kg (2021); Total: 222 kg (2021)
Medal record
Representing IWF Refugee Team
World Juniors Championships
Bronze medal – third place	2024 León	81 kg
Representing Iran
World Juniors Championships
Bronze medal – third place	2021 Tashkent	87 kg
World Youth Championships
Silver medal – second place	2021 Jeddah	81 kg

Yekta Jamali (Persian: یکتا جمالی, born December 16, 2004, in Sedeh Lenjan, Isfahan) is an Iranian-born weightlifter.

== Career ==
She won a bronze medal at the 2021 Junior World Championships in the 87 kg weight division. Her medal was Iran's women team's first ever in the sport.

She represented the Refugee Olympic Team at the 2024 Paris Olympic Games, after being granted asylum in Germany in 2022. She lifted 231 kg in total and placed ninth.

== Major results ==
Year	Venue	Weight	Snatch (kg)				Clean & Jerk (kg)				Total	Rank
Year	Venue	Weight	1	2	3	Rank	1	2	3	Rank	Total	Rank
Olympic Games
2024	Paris, France	81 kg	95	99	103	—N/a	124	128	~~133~~	—N/a	231	9
World Championships
2021	Tashkent, Uzbekistan	87 kg	90	96	100	10	113	118	122	10	222	9
2024	Manama, Bahrain	81 kg	100	104	~~107~~	8	127	131	133	8	237	7
2025	Førde, Norway	77 kg	102	106	108	5	125	~~130~~	130	13	238	8
World Junior Championships
2021	Tashkent, Uzbekistan	87 kg	85	90	92	3rd place, bronze medalist(s)	105	111	116	3rd place, bronze medalist(s)	208	3rd place, bronze medalist(s)
2022	Heraklion, Greece	87 kg	94	98	100	2nd place, silver medalist(s)	115	~~121~~	121	6	221	4
World Youth Championships
2021	Jeddah, Saudi Arabia	81 kg	86	90	~~93~~	3rd place, bronze medalist(s)	107	115	~~119~~	2nd place, silver medalist(s)	205	2nd place, silver medalist(s)
