= Saeid Sayyar =

Iranian weightlifter

Personal information
- Nationality: Iran
- Born: January 20, 1992 (age 34)
- Weight: 103.29 kg (227.7 lb)

Sport
- Country: Iran
- Sport: Weightlifting
- Event: 105 kg

Achievements and titles
- Personal bests: Snatch: 176 kg (2012); Clean and jerk: 208 kg (2012); Total: 384 kg (2012)
Medal record
Representing Iran
Men's weightlifting

Saeid Sayyar (Persian: سعید سیار, born January 20, 1992, is an Iranian weightlifter.

== Major results ==
Year	Venue	Weight	Snatch (kg)				Clean & Jerk (kg)				Total	Rank
Year	Venue	Weight	1	2	3	Rank	1	2	3	Rank	Total	Rank
World Junior Championships
2012	Antigua, Guatemala	105 kg	167	173	176	2nd place, silver medalist(s)	208	~~216~~	~~216~~	5	384	3rd place, bronze medalist(s)
World Youth Championships
2009	Chiang Mai, Thailand	94 kg	133	137	~~141~~	2nd place, silver medalist(s)	163	167	~~170~~	2nd place, silver medalist(s)	304	2nd place, silver medalist(s)
