= 2021 World Weightlifting Championships – Women's 87 kg =

Weightlifting Championship

The women's 87 kilograms competition at the 2021 World Weightlifting Championships was held on 16 December 2021.

== Schedule ==
Date	Time	Event
16 December 2021	10:30	Group B
16 December 2021	19:00	Group A

== Medalists ==
Event	Gold		Silver		Bronze	
Snatch	Tursunoy Jabborova (UZB)	113 kg	Mönkhjantsangiin Ankhtsetseg (MGL)	109 kg	Amanda Schott (BRA)	106 kg
Clean & Jerk	Solfrid Koanda (NOR)	141 kg	Mönkhjantsangiin Ankhtsetseg (MGL)	141 kg	Daria Akhmerova (RWF)	135 kg
Total	Mönkhjantsangiin Ankhtsetseg (MGL)	250 kg	Tursunoy Jabborova (UZB)	244 kg	Solfrid Koanda (NOR)	244 kg

== Records ==
Prior to this competition, the existing world records were as follows.

World Record	Snatch	World Standard	132 kg	—	1 November 2018
World Record	Clean & Jerk	World Standard	164 kg	—	1 November 2018
World Record	Total	World Standard	294 kg	—	1 November 2018

== Results ==
Rank	Athlete	Group	Snatch (kg)				Clean & Jerk (kg)				Total
Rank	Athlete	Group	1	2	3	Rank	1	2	3	Rank	Total
1st place, gold medalist(s)	Mönkhjantsangiin Ankhtsetseg (MGL)	A	~~109~~	109	~~113~~	2nd place, silver medalist(s)	~~137~~	137	141	2nd place, silver medalist(s)	250
2nd place, silver medalist(s)	Tursunoy Jabborova (UZB)	A	108	111	113	1st place, gold medalist(s)	127	131	~~134~~	4	244
3rd place, bronze medalist(s)	Solfrid Koanda (NOR)	A	98	103	~~107~~	7	135	141	~~142~~	1st place, gold medalist(s)	244
4	Daria Akhmerova (RWF)	A	105	~~109~~	~~109~~	4	135	~~140~~	~~140~~	3rd place, bronze medalist(s)	240
5	Amanda Schott (BRA)	A	102	106	~~109~~	3rd place, bronze medalist(s)	123	~~130~~	130	5	236
6	Juliana Riotto (USA)	A	101	103	105	5	128	~~132~~	~~132~~	6	233
7	Karina Kuzganbayeva (KAZ)	A	98	~~102~~	102	8	122	125	128	7	230
8	Kristel Ngarlem (CAN)	B	95	99	~~101~~	11	120	125	~~128~~	8	224
9	Yekta Jamali (IRI)	A	90	96	100	10	113	118	122	10	222
10	Tian Chia-hsin (TPE)	A	95	~~100~~	~~101~~	12	120	125	~~130~~	9	220
11	Clémentine Meukeugni (CMR)	B	93	~~97~~	~~97~~	13	115	119	~~132~~	11	212
12	Louise Vennekilde (DEN)	B	92	~~96~~	~~97~~	14	110	115	~~119~~	12	207
13	Lenka Žembová (SVK)	B	88	~~91~~	~~91~~	16	105	108	~~111~~	13	196
14	Anuradha Pavunraj (IND)	B	90	~~93~~	—	15	105	~~117~~	—	14	195
15	Chathurika Priyanthi (SRI)	B	~~80~~	80	~~85~~	17	100	~~105~~	105	15	185
16	Sientje Henderson (JAM)	B	71	74	~~77~~	18	~~95~~	96	~~101~~	16	170
—	Kim Ji-hye (KOR)	A	100	~~104~~	~~104~~	9	~~128~~	~~129~~	~~129~~	—	—
—	Laura Alexander (USA)	A	101	104	~~107~~	6	~~130~~	~~130~~	~~132~~	—	—
