= 2021 Youth World Weightlifting Championships =

International weightlifting competition

- Location: Jeddah, Saudi Arabia
- Dates: 5–12 October
- Competitors: 221 from 50 nations

The 2021 Youth World Weightlifting Championships was held from 5 to 12 October in Jeddah, Saudi Arabia.

== Medals tables ==
Ranking by Big (Total result) medals

* Host nation (Saudi Arabia)

Rank	Nation	Gold	Silver	Bronze	Total
1	Russia	6	3	2	11
2	Colombia	2	1	2	5
3	Thailand	2	1	1	4
3	United States	2	1	1	4
5	Kazakhstan	2	0	0	2
6	Turkey	1	4	3	8
7	Georgia	1	2	0	3
7	Uzbekistan	1	2	0	3
9	Iran	1	1	1	3
10	Armenia	1	0	0	1
10	Philippines	1	0	0	1
12	Poland	0	2	1	3
13	Brazil	0	1	0	1
13	Czech Republic	0	1	0	1
13	Venezuela	0	1	0	1
16	Mexico	0	0	4	4
17	Indonesia	0	0	1	1
17	Iraq	0	0	1	1
17	Saudi Arabia*	0	0	1	1
17	Spain	0	0	1	1
17	Ukraine	0	0	1	1
Totals (21 entries)		20	20	20	60

Ranking by all medals: Big (Total result) and Small (Snatch and Clean & Jerk)

* Host nation (Saudi Arabia)

Rank	Nation	Gold	Silver	Bronze	Total
1	Russia	13	11	10	34
2	Turkey	6	7	9	22
3	Kazakhstan	6	0	0	6
4	United States	5	5	4	14
5	Colombia	5	4	5	14
6	Thailand	5	3	4	12
7	Uzbekistan	4	4	3	11
8	Mexico	3	3	6	12
9	Iran	3	2	4	9
10	Georgia	2	6	1	9
11	Poland	2	3	2	7
12	Philippines	2	1	1	4
13	Armenia	2	0	1	3
14	Czech Republic	1	2	0	3
15	Indonesia	1	0	3	4
16	Brazil	0	3	1	4
17	Venezuela	0	3	0	3
18	Iraq	0	1	1	2
18	Saudi Arabia*	0	1	1	2
18	Spain	0	1	1	2
21	Ukraine	0	0	3	3
Totals (21 entries)		60	60	60	180

== Medal overview ==
=== Men ===
Event		Gold		Silver		Bronze	
– 49 kg	Snatch	Oleg Prokopev (RUS)	83 kg	Alexandr Džobák (CZE)	79 kg	Kevin Yepes (COL)	79 kg
– 49 kg	Clean & Jerk	Alexandr Džobák (CZE)	106 kg	Oleg Prokopev (RUS)	105 kg	Kevin Yepes (COL)	104 kg
– 49 kg	Total	Oleg Prokopev (RUS)	188 kg	Alexandr Džobák (CZE)	185 kg	Kevin Yepes (COL)	183 kg
– 55 kg	Snatch	Satrio Adi Nugroho (INA)	111 kg YWR	Ali Majed Kalitit (KSA)	100 kg	Patsaphong Thongsuk (THA)	99 kg
– 55 kg	Clean & Jerk	Adolfo Tun (MEX)	125 kg	Patsaphong Thongsuk (THA)	124 kg	Ertuğrul Seçgin (TUR)	123 kg
– 55 kg	Total	Patsaphong Thongsuk (THA)	223 kg	Ertuğrul Seçgin (TUR)	221 kg	Ali Majed Kalitit (KSA)	215 kg
– 61 kg	Snatch	Kaan Kahriman (TUR)	123 kg YWR	Hampton Morris (USA)	120 kg	Khusinboy Matrasulov (UZB)	119 kg
– 61 kg	Clean & Jerk	Hampton Morris (USA)	156 kg YWR	Herseleid Carrazco (MEX)	145 kg	Rafik Minasyan (ARM)	144 kg
– 61 kg	Total	Hampton Morris (USA)	276 kg YWR	Kaan Kahriman (TUR)	264 kg	Herseleid Carrazco (MEX)	263 kg
– 67 kg	Snatch	Weeraphon Wichuma (THA)	128 kg	Reinner Arango (VEN)	125 kg	Serhii Kolesnyk (UKR)	121 kg
– 67 kg	Clean & Jerk	Weeraphon Wichuma (THA)	160 kg	Reinner Arango (VEN)	152 kg	Worrapot Nasuriwong (THA)	151 kg
– 67 kg	Total	Weeraphon Wichuma (THA)	288 kg	Reinner Arango (VEN)	277 kg	Serhii Kolesnyk (UKR)	271 kg
– 73 kg	Snatch	Diyorbek Ermatov (UZB)	132 kg	Nikita Vagin (RUS)	130 kg	Nikoloz Esartia (GEO)	128 kg
– 73 kg	Clean & Jerk	Nikita Vagin (RUS)	161 kg	Nikoloz Esartia (GEO)	159 kg	Mark Lievanzov (UKR)	158 kg
– 73 kg	Total	Nikita Vagin (RUS)	291 kg	Nikoloz Esartia (GEO)	287 kg	Kilian Gallart (ESP)	284 kg
– 81 kg	Snatch	Alireza Abbaspour (IRI)	147 kg	Dimitrii Shmarin (RUS)	142 kg	Mukhammad Romanov (RUS)	141 kg
– 81 kg	Clean & Jerk	Alireza Abbaspour (IRI)	181 kg	Dimitrii Shmarin (RUS)	168 kg	Mukhammad Romanov (RUS)	164 kg
– 81 kg	Total	Alireza Abbaspour (IRI)	328 kg	Dimitrii Shmarin (RUS)	310 kg	Mukhammad Romanov (RUS)	305 kg
– 89 kg	Snatch	Hakan Şükrü Kurnaz (TUR)	149 kg	Enes Çelik (TUR)	148 kg	Mikhail Podkorytov (RUS)	142 kg
– 89 kg	Clean & Jerk	Aleksandr Lazaryan (ARM)	182 kg	Mikhail Podkorytov (RUS)	180 kg	Hakan Şükrü Kurnaz (TUR)	170 kg
– 89 kg	Total	Aleksandr Lazaryan (ARM)	323 kg	Mikhail Podkorytov (RUS)	322 kg	Hakan Şükrü Kurnaz (TUR)	319 kg
– 96 kg	Snatch	Kurbonmurod Nomozov (UZB)	153 kg	Gurami Vekua (GEO)	148 kg	Muhammed Burun (TUR)	147 kg
– 96 kg	Clean & Jerk	Kurbonmurod Nomozov (UZB)	189 kg	Gurami Vekua (GEO)	180 kg	Muhammed Burun (TUR)	179 kg
– 96 kg	Total	Kurbonmurod Nomozov (UZB)	342 kg	Gurami Vekua (GEO)	328 kg	Muhammed Burun (TUR)	326 kg
– 102 kg	Snatch	Rakhat Bekbolat (KAZ)	155 kg	Taner Çağlar (TUR)	152 kg	Szymon Ziółkowski (POL)	151 kg
– 102 kg	Clean & Jerk	Rakhat Bekbolat (KAZ)	200 kg	Amar Rubaiawi Ali (IRQ)	185 kg	Taner Çağlar (TUR)	185 kg
– 102 kg	Total	Rakhat Bekbolat (KAZ)	355 kg	Taner Çağlar (TUR)	337 kg	Amar Rubaiawi Ali (IRQ)	334 kg
+ 102 kg	Snatch	Aslambek Pliev (RUS)	150 kg	Ivan Salamatin (RUS)	148 kg	Amir Reza Mohammadinia (IRI)	144 kg
+ 102 kg	Clean & Jerk	Aslambek Pliev (RUS)	190 kg	Colin Reis (USA)	169 kg	Ivan Salamatin (RUS)	168 kg
+ 102 kg	Total	Aslambek Pliev (RUS)	340 kg	Ivan Salamatin (RUS)	316 kg	Amir Reza Mohammadinia (IRI)	310 kg

=== Women ===
Event		Gold		Silver		Bronze	
– 40 kg	Snatch	Ezgi Kılıç (TUR)	55 kg	Lawren Estrada (COL)	53 kg	Jeaneth Hipolito (PHI)	52 kg
– 40 kg	Clean & Jerk	Ezgi Kılıç (TUR)	70 kg	Darly Canto (MEX)	67 kg	Alexandra López (MEX)	66 kg
– 40 kg	Total	Ezgi Kılıç (TUR)	125 kg	Lawren Estrada (COL)	118 kg	Darly Canto (MEX)	118 kg
– 45 kg	Snatch	Rose Jean Ramos (PHI)	67 kg	Ruth Fuentefria (ESP)	63 kg	Najla Khoirunnisa (INA)	62 kg
– 45 kg	Clean & Jerk	Oliwia Drzazga (POL)	85 kg	Rose Jean Ramos (PHI)	80 kg	Najla Khoirunnisa (INA)	80 kg
– 45 kg	Total	Rose Jean Ramos (PHI)	147 kg	Oliwia Drzazga (POL)	143 kg	Najla Khoirunnisa (INA)	142 kg
– 49 kg	Snatch	Karoll López (COL)	73 kg	Milana Kutiakina (RUS)	73 kg	Viktoria Barabanova (RUS)	72 kg
– 49 kg	Clean & Jerk	Medine Bilicier (TUR)	93 kg	Milana Kutiakina (RUS)	93 kg	Karoll López (COL)	88 kg
– 49 kg	Total	Milana Kutiakina (RUS)	166 kg	Medine Bilicier (TUR)	165 kg	Karoll López (COL)	161 kg
– 55 kg	Snatch	Katharine Estep (USA)	89 kg YWR	Ximena León (MEX)	78 kg	Miranda Ulrey (USA)	77 kg
– 55 kg	Clean & Jerk	Katharine Estep (USA)	109 kg	Júlia Vieira Rodrigues (BRA)	97 kg	Ozoda Hojieva (UZB)	95 kg
– 55 kg	Total	Katharine Estep (USA)	198 kg YWR	Ozoda Hojieva (UZB)	172 kg	Ximena León (MEX)	171 kg
– 59 kg	Snatch	Dubaney Sinisterra (COL)	81 kg	Parichat Kunnara (THA)	80 kg	Arissara Raidee (THA)	78 kg
– 59 kg	Clean & Jerk	Parichat Kunnara (THA)	100 kg	Dubaney Sinisterra (COL)	100 kg	Ghazaleh Hosseini (IRI)	94 kg
– 59 kg	Total	Dubaney Sinisterra (COL)	181 kg	Parichat Kunnara (THA)	180 kg	Arissara Raidee (THA)	170 kg
– 64 kg	Snatch	Monika Marach (POL)	92 kg	Ingrid Segura (COL)	88 kg	Alana Skripko (RUS)	82 kg
– 64 kg	Clean & Jerk	Ingrid Segura (COL)	116 kg	Monika Marach (POL)	111 kg	Haley Trinh (USA)	103 kg
– 64 kg	Total	Ingrid Segura (COL)	204 kg	Monika Marach (POL)	203 kg	Haley Trinh (USA)	184 kg
– 71 kg	Snatch	Zarina Gusalova (RUS)	103 kg YWR	Nigora Suvonova (UZB)	92 kg	Mia Rhodes (USA)	88 kg
– 71 kg	Clean & Jerk	Zarina Gusalova (RUS)	123 kg	Nigora Suvonova (UZB)	114 kg	Sevinchoy Komilova (UZB)	111 kg
– 71 kg	Total	Zarina Gusalova (RUS)	226 kg YWR	Nigora Suvonova (UZB)	206 kg	Martyna Dołęga (POL)	195 kg
– 76 kg	Snatch	Ángeles Cruz (MEX)	90 kg	Alyssa Ballard (USA)	89 kg	Madina Kelekhsaeva (RUS)	88 kg
– 76 kg	Clean & Jerk	Madina Kelekhsaeva (RUS)	117 kg	Alyssa Ballard (USA)	115 kg	Ángeles Cruz (MEX)	109 kg
– 76 kg	Total	Madina Kelekhsaeva (RUS)	205 kg	Alyssa Ballard (USA)	204 kg	Ángeles Cruz (MEX)	199 kg
– 81 kg	Snatch	Mayrín Hernández (MEX)	92 kg	Natia Gadelia (GEO)	91 kg	Yekta Jamali (IRI)	90 kg
– 81 kg	Clean & Jerk	Natia Gadelia (GEO)	117 kg	Yekta Jamali (IRI)	115 kg	Daria Meshcherakova (RUS)	114 kg
– 81 kg	Total	Natia Gadelia (GEO)	208 kg	Yekta Jamali (IRI)	205 kg	Daria Meshcherakova (RUS)	201 kg
+ 81 kg	Snatch	Rufina Chalkarova (KAZ)	107 kg	Fatmagül Çevik (TUR)	95 kg	Taiane Justino (BRA)	94 kg
+ 81 kg	Clean & Jerk	Rufina Chalkarova (KAZ)	140 kg	Taiane Justino (BRA)	125 kg	Fatmagül Çevik (TUR)	108 kg
+ 81 kg	Total	Rufina Chalkarova (KAZ)	247 kg	Taiane Justino (BRA)	219 kg	Fatmagül Çevik (TUR)	203 kg

== Team ranking ==
=== Men ===
Rank	Team	Points
1	Russia	725
2	United States	555
3	Saudi Arabia	534
4	Turkey	430
5	Iran	349
6	Uzbekistan	323

=== Women ===
Rank	Team	Points
1	United States	655
2	Russia	507
3	Iran	405
4	Colombia	355
5	Mexico	352
6	Turkey	287

== Participating nations ==
221 weightlifters from 50 countries were registered to compete:

Albania (1); Algeria (2); Armenia (3); Austria (1); Bangladesh (1); Belarus (4); Belgium (1); Brazil (2); Colombia (6); Croatia (2); Czech Republic (4); France (1); Georgia (3)	Great Britain (4); Greece (1); Hungary (2); Iceland (2); Indonesia (2); Iran (14); Iraq (1); Jordan (3); Kazakhstan (2); Kuwait (1); Kyrgyzstan (1); Lithuania (9); Mexico (9)	Mongolia (3); Morocco (5); Nigeria (2); Norway (4); Panama (1); Peru (2); Philippines (6); Poland (9); Puerto Rico (2); Russia (17); Saudi Arabia (13); Slovakia (1); Slovenia (1)	Spain (5); Syria (3); Thailand (7); Turkey (10); Uganda (2); Ukraine (10); United Arab Emirates (1); United States (20); Uzbekistan (9); Venezuela (3); Yemen (3)
