= List of African youth records in Olympic weightlifting =

This is the list of African youth records in Olympic weightlifting. They are the best results set in competition by athletes aged 13 to 17 throughout the entire calendar year of the performance. Records are maintained in each weight class for the snatch, clean and jerk, and the total for both by the Weightlifting Federation of Africa (WFA).

== Current records ==
Key to tables: Awaiting ratification Not ratified or later rescinded by WFA

=== Men ===
Event	Record	Athlete	Nation	Date	Meet	Place	Age	Ref
55 kg
Snatch	88 kg	Standard						
Clean & Jerk	109 kg	Standard						
Total	195 kg	Standard						
60 kg
Snatch	101 kg	Standard						
Clean & Jerk	124 kg	Standard						
Total	224 kg	Standard						
65 kg
Snatch	118 kg	Sadek Ahmed	Egypt	7 July 2026	World Youth Championships	Cali, Colombia	17 years, 14 days	
Clean & Jerk	144 kg	Standard						
Total	253 kg	Standard						
70 kg
Snatch	126 kg	Standard						
Clean & Jerk	158 kg	Standard						
Total	281 kg	Standard						
75 kg
Snatch	134 kg	Standard						
Clean & Jerk	167 kg	Standard						
Total	298 kg	Standard						
85 kg
Snatch	143 kg	Standard						
Clean & Jerk	176 kg	Standard						
Total	318 kg	Standard						
95 kg
Snatch	144 kg	Standard						
Clean & Jerk	172 kg	Standard						
Total	319 kg	Standard						
+95 kg
Snatch	123 kg	Standard						
Clean & Jerk	150 kg	Standard						
Total	269 kg	Standard						

=== Women ===
Event	Record	Athlete	Nation	Date	Meet	Place	Age	Ref
45 kg
Snatch	57 kg	Standard						
Clean & Jerk	72 kg	Standard						
Total	129 kg	Standard						
49 kg
Snatch	67 kg	Standard						
Clean & Jerk	84 kg	Standard						
Total	151 kg	Standard						
53 kg
Snatch	81 kg	Basma Ramadan	Egypt	2 May 2026	World Junior Championships	Ismailia, Egypt	16 years, 285 days	
Clean & Jerk	106 kg	Basma Ramadan	Egypt	2 May 2026	World Junior Championships	Ismailia, Egypt	16 years, 285 days	
Total	187 kg	Basma Ramadan	Egypt	2 May 2026	World Junior Championships	Ismailia, Egypt	16 years, 285 days	
57 kg
Snatch	81 kg	Standard						
Clean & Jerk	101 kg	Standard						
Total	180 kg	Standard						
61 kg
Snatch	87 kg	Standard						
Clean & Jerk	107 kg	Standard						
Total	192 kg	Standard						
69 kg
Snatch	94 kg	Standard						
Clean & Jerk	114 kg	Standard						
Total	206 kg	Standard						
77 kg
Snatch	95 kg	Standard						
Clean & Jerk	117 kg	Standard						
Total	210 kg	Standard						
+77 kg
Snatch	101 kg	Hiba Tbini	Tunisia	11 July 2026	World Youth Championships	Cali, Colombia	17 years, 19 days	
Clean & Jerk	121 kg	Standard						
Total	213 kg	Standard						

== Historical records ==
=== Men (2025–2026) ===
Event	Record	Athlete	Nation	Date	Meet	Place	Age	Ref
56 kg
Snatch	95 kg	Standard						
Clean & Jerk	119 kg	Standard						
Total	213 kg	Standard						
71 kg
Snatch	127 kg	Standard						
Clean & Jerk	161 kg	Standard						
Total	285 kg	Standard						
79 kg
Snatch	142 kg	Ali Ali	Egypt	20 August 2025	African Youth Championships	Accra, Ghana		
Snatch	151 kg	Ali Abdelradi	Egypt	5 May 2026	World Junior Championships	Ismailia, Egypt	17 years, 82 days	
Clean & Jerk	173 kg	Standard						
Clean & Jerk	182 kg	Ali Abdelradi	Egypt	5 May 2026	World Junior Championships	Ismailia, Egypt	17 years, 82 days	
Total	309 kg	Ali Ali	Egypt	20 August 2025	African Youth Championships	Accra, Ghana		
Total	333 kg	Ali Abdelradi	Egypt	5 May 2026	World Junior Championships	Ismailia, Egypt	17 years, 82 days	
88 kg
Snatch	144 kg	Standard						
Clean & Jerk	177 kg	Standard						
Total	320 kg	Standard						
94 kg
Snatch	144 kg	Standard						
Clean & Jerk	175 kg	Standard						
Total	320 kg	Standard						
+94 kg
Snatch	127 kg	Standard						
Clean & Jerk	154 kg	Standard						
Total	277 kg	Standard						

=== Men (2018–2025) ===
Event	Record	Athlete	Nation	Date	Meet	Place	Age	Ref
49 kg
Snatch	76 kg	Willem Emile	Mauritius	8 March 2019	Youth World Championships	Las Vegas, United States	16 years, 78 days	
Clean & Jerk	95 kg	Abdelmoamnen Shetawy	Algeria	27 October 2023	African Youth Championships	Cairo, Egypt		
Total	170 kg	Abdelmoamnen Shetawy	Algeria	27 October 2023	African Youth Championships	Cairo, Egypt		
55 kg
Snatch	99 kg	Mahmoud Sajir Jebali	Tunisia	26 March 2023	Youth World Championships	Durrës, Albania	16 years, 278 days	
Clean & Jerk	125 kg	Davis Niyoyita	Uganda	7 December 2021	World Championships	Tashkent, Uzbekistan	17 years, 340 days	
Total	220 kg	Davis Niyoyita	Uganda	7 December 2021	World Championships	Tashkent, Uzbekistan	17 years, 340 days	
61 kg
Snatch	102 kg	Mohamed Aziz Belhaj	Tunisia	26 April 2019	African Championships	Cairo, Egypt	17 years, 102 days	
Snatch	113 kg	Elsayed Aly Attia	Egypt	27 October 2023	African Junior Championships	Cairo, Egypt	17 years, 298 days	
Clean & Jerk	126 kg	Standard						
Clean & Jerk	148 kg	Elsayed Aly Attia	Egypt	27 October 2023	African Junior Championships	Cairo, Egypt	17 years, 298 days	
Total	227 kg	Standard						
Total	261 kg	Elsayed Aly Attia	Egypt	27 October 2023	African Junior Championships	Cairo, Egypt	17 years, 298 days	
67 kg
Snatch	128 kg	Abdelrahman Hussein	Egypt	23 May 2024	Youth World Championships	Lima, Peru	15 years, 160 days	
Clean & Jerk	158 kg	Abdelrahman Hussein	Egypt	23 May 2024	Youth World Championships	Lima, Peru	15 years, 160 days	
Total	286 kg	Abdelrahman Hussein	Egypt	23 May 2024	Youth World Championships	Lima, Peru	15 years, 160 days	
73 kg
Snatch	140 kg	Abdelrahman Hussein	Egypt	22 November 2024	African Youth Championships	Nairobi, Kenya	15 years, 343 days	
Clean & Jerk	174 kg	Abdelrahman Hussein	Egypt	22 November 2024	African Youth Championships	Nairobi, Kenya	15 years, 343 days	
Total	314 kg	Abdelrahman Hussein	Egypt	22 November 2024	African Youth Championships	Nairobi, Kenya	15 years, 343 days	
81 kg
Snatch	144 kg	Moustafa Mahmoud Bakry	Egypt	24 May 2024	Youth World Championships	Lima, Peru	16 years, 152 days	
Clean & Jerk	182 kg	Mahmoud Hosny	Egypt	6 May 2022	Junior World Championships	Heraklion, Greece	16 years, 244 days	
Total	324 kg	Mahmoud Hosny	Egypt	6 May 2022	Junior World Championships	Heraklion, Greece	16 years, 244 days	
89 kg
Snatch	150 kg	Mahmoud Hosny	Egypt	15 June 2022	Youth World Championships	León, Mexico	16 years, 284 days	
Clean & Jerk	193 kg	Mahmoud Hosny	Egypt	15 June 2022	Youth World Championships	León, Mexico	16 years, 284 days	
Total	343 kg	Mahmoud Hosny	Egypt	15 June 2022	Youth World Championships	León, Mexico	16 years, 284 days	
96 kg
Snatch	144 kg	Mahgoub Mahmoud	Egypt	25 May 2024	Youth World Championships	Lima, Peru	16 years, 208 days	
Clean & Jerk	167 kg	Mahgoub Mahmoud	Egypt	25 May 2024	Youth World Championships	Lima, Peru	16 years, 208 days	
Total	311 kg	Mahgoub Mahmoud	Egypt	25 May 2024	Youth World Championships	Lima, Peru	16 years, 208 days	
102 kg
Snatch	140 kg	Mashal Omar	Egypt	25 May 2024	Youth World Championships	Lima, Peru	16 years, 339 days	
Clean & Jerk	170 kg	Mashal Omar	Egypt	25 May 2024	Youth World Championships	Lima, Peru	16 years, 339 days	
Total	310 kg	Mashal Omar	Egypt	25 May 2024	Youth World Championships	Lima, Peru	16 years, 339 days	
+102 kg
Snatch	135 kg	Bilal Bouamr	Morocco	12 October 2021	Youth World Championships	Jeddah, Saudi Arabia	17 years, 223 days	
Clean & Jerk	161 kg	Khelwin Juboo	Mauritius	12 September 2019	African Youth Championships	Kampala, Uganda	17 years, 77 days	
Total	296 kg	Bilal Bouamr	Morocco	12 October 2021	Youth World Championships	Jeddah, Saudi Arabia	17 years, 223 days	

=== Women (2025–2026) ===
Event	Record	Athlete	Nation	Date	Meet	Place	Age	Ref
44 kg
Snatch	59 kg	Standard						
Clean & Jerk	73 kg	Standard						
Total	127 kg	Standard						
48 kg
Snatch	68 kg	Standard						
Clean & Jerk	83 kg	Standard						
Total	147 kg	Standard						
58 kg
Snatch	85 kg	Standard						
Snatch	88 kg	Yasmine Abdalla	Egypt	3 May 2026	World Junior Championships	Ismailia, Egypt	16 years, 315 days	
Clean & Jerk	104 kg	Standard						
Clean & Jerk	110 kg	Yasmine Abdalla	Egypt	3 May 2026	World Junior Championships	Ismailia, Egypt	16 years, 315 days	
Total	187 kg	Standard						
Total	198 kg	Yasmine Abdalla	Egypt	3 May 2026	World Junior Championships	Ismailia, Egypt	16 years, 315 days	
63 kg
Snatch	92 kg	Standard						
Clean & Jerk	112 kg	Standard						
Total	201 kg	Standard						

=== Women (2018–2025) ===
Event	Record	Athlete	Nation	Date	Meet	Place	Age	Ref
40 kg
Snatch	45 kg	Maysa Khadraoui	Tunisia	25 March 2023	Youth World Championships	Durrës, Albania	16 years, 319 days	
Clean & Jerk	65 kg	Maysa Khadraoui	Tunisia	25 March 2023	Youth World Championships	Durrës, Albania	16 years, 319 days	
Clean & Jerk	66 kg	Basma Gunaidy	Egypt	25 March 2023	Youth World Championships	Durrës, Albania	13 years, 247 days	
Total	110 kg	Maysa Khadraoui	Tunisia	25 March 2023	Youth World Championships	Durrës, Albania	16 years, 319 days	
45 kg
Snatch	67 kg	Habiba Saad	Egypt	12 June 2022	Youth World Championships	León, Mexico	14 years, 286 days	
Clean & Jerk	78 kg	Basma Gunaidy	Egypt	26 October 2023	African Youth Championships	Cairo, Egypt	14 years, 97 days	
Total	137 kg	Habiba Saad	Egypt	12 June 2022	Youth World Championships	León, Mexico	14 years, 286 days	
49 kg
Snatch	79 kg	Noura Essam	Egypt	5 December 2022	World Championships	Bogotá, Colombia	17 years, 259 days	
Clean & Jerk	87 kg	Habiba Saad	Egypt	23 May 2024	Youth World Championships	Lima, Peru	16 years, 267 days	
Total	156 kg	Habiba Saad	Egypt	23 May 2024	Youth World Championships	Lima, Peru	16 years, 267 days	
55 kg
Snatch	80 kg	Noura Essam	Egypt	28 October 2022	African Championships	Cairo, Egypt	17 years, 221 days	
Clean & Jerk	97 kg	Aya Motawea	Egypt	27 March 2023	Youth World Championships	Durrës, Albania	16 years, 214 days	
Total	174 kg	Noura Essam	Egypt	28 October 2022	African Championships	Cairo, Egypt	17 years, 221 days	
59 kg
Snatch	92 kg	Ghofrane Belkhir	Tunisia	10 December 2018	International Solidarity Championships	Cairo, Egypt	17 years, 121 days	
Clean & Jerk	114 kg	Ghofrane Belkhir	Tunisia	10 December 2018	International Solidarity Championships	Cairo, Egypt	17 years, 121 days	
Total	206 kg	Ghofrane Belkhir	Tunisia	10 December 2018	International Solidarity Championships	Cairo, Egypt	17 years, 121 days	
64 kg
Snatch	91 kg	Neama Said	Egypt	27 April 2019	African Championships	Cairo, Egypt	16 years, 163 days	
Clean & Jerk	111 kg	Neama Said	Egypt	27 April 2019	African Championships	Cairo, Egypt	16 years, 163 days	
Total	202 kg	Neama Said	Egypt	27 April 2019	African Championships	Cairo, Egypt	16 years, 163 days	
71 kg
Snatch	100 kg	Joy Ogbonne Eze	Nigeria	13 December 2021	World Championships	Tashkent, Uzbekistan	17 years, 190 days	
Clean & Jerk	130 kg	Joy Ogbonne Eze	Nigeria	13 December 2021	World Championships	Tashkent, Uzbekistan	17 years, 190 days	
Total	230 kg	Joy Ogbonne Eze	Nigeria	13 December 2021	World Championships	Tashkent, Uzbekistan	17 years, 190 days	
76 kg
Snatch	101 kg	Standard						
Clean & Jerk	124 kg	Standard						
Total	221 kg	Rahma Ahmed	Egypt	30 March 2023	Youth World Championships	Durrës, Albania	17 years, 85 days	
81 kg
Snatch	105 kg	Standard						
Clean & Jerk	131 kg	Standard						
Total	232 kg	Shams Mohamed	Egypt	31 March 2023	Youth World Championships	Durrës, Albania	16 years, 320 days	
+81 kg
Snatch	99 kg	Standard						
Clean & Jerk	122 kg	Standard						
Total	218 kg	Standard						
