= 2024 Youth World Weightlifting Championships =

Weightlifting competition in Lima, Peru

- Venue: Villa Deportiva Nacional
- Location: Lima, Peru
- Dates: 22 – 26 May
- Competitors: 282 from 52 nations

The 2024 Youth World Weightlifting Championships was a weightlifting competition held from 22 to 26 May in Lima, Peru.

== Medal table ==
Ranking by Big (Total result) medals

* Host nation (Peru)

Rank	Nation	Gold	Silver	Bronze	Total
1	Venezuela	3	1	1	5
2	India	2	2	2	6
3	Colombia	2	1	1	4
3	Kazakhstan	2	1	1	4
5	Uzbekistan	1	1	2	4
6	Egypt	1	1	1	3
7	Canada	1	1	0	2
7	Georgia	1	1	0	2
7	Syria	1	1	0	2
7	Turkmenistan	1	1	0	2
11	Turkey	1	0	2	3
12	Moldova	1	0	1	2
13	Argentina	1	0	0	1
13	Italy	1	0	0	1
13	Spain	1	0	0	1
16	Armenia	0	2	0	2
17	Ukraine	0	1	1	2
17	United States	0	1	1	2
19	Finland	0	1	0	1
19	Iceland	0	1	0	1
19	Japan	0	1	0	1
19	Nauru	0	1	0	1
19	Saudi Arabia	0	1	0	1
24	Mexico	0	0	2	2
25	Chinese Taipei	0	0	1	1
25	France	0	0	1	1
25	Iraq	0	0	1	1
25	Poland	0	0	1	1
25	Thailand	0	0	1	1
Totals (29 entries)		20	20	20	60

Ranking by all medals: Big (Total result) and Small (Snatch and Clean & Jerk)

* Host nation (Peru)

Rank	Nation	Gold	Silver	Bronze	Total
1	Venezuela	6	6	4	16
2	India	6	4	7	17
3	Kazakhstan	6	4	1	11
4	Colombia	5	3	2	10
5	Egypt	4	5	3	12
6	Georgia	3	2	3	8
7	Canada	3	2	0	5
7	Syria	3	2	0	5
9	Turkmenistan	3	1	3	7
10	Moldova	3	0	2	5
11	Argentina	3	0	0	3
12	Uzbekistan	2	6	4	12
13	Armenia	2	3	1	6
14	Turkey	2	2	4	8
15	Spain	2	1	0	3
16	Italy	2	0	2	4
17	Ukraine	1	3	3	7
18	Nauru	1	2	0	3
19	Mexico	1	1	3	5
20	Iraq	1	0	1	2
21	Bulgaria	1	0	0	1
22	Saudi Arabia	0	3	1	4
23	Japan	0	3	0	3
24	Finland	0	2	1	3
24	United States	0	2	1	3
26	Brazil	0	2	0	2
27	Iceland	0	1	1	2
28	Thailand	0	0	4	4
29	Chinese Taipei	0	0	3	3
29	Poland	0	0	3	3
31	France	0	0	2	2
32	New Zealand	0	0	1	1
Totals (32 entries)		60	60	60	180

== Medal overview ==
=== Men ===
Event	Gold		Silver		Bronze	
49 kg
Snatch	Freddy Bustillo; Colombia	103 kg	Mohammed Al-Ojaian; Saudi Arabia	102 kg	Christian Di Maria; Italy	100 kg
Clean & Jerk	Freddy Bustillo; Colombia	109 kg	Mohammed Al-Ojaian; Saudi Arabia	108 kg	Babulal Hembrom; India	107 kg
Total	Freddy Bustillo; Colombia	196 kg	Mohammed Al-Ojaian; Saudi Arabia	195 kg	Babulal Hembrom; India	193 kg
55 kg
Snatch	Nino Simeonov; Bulgaria	101 kg	Ramazan Efe Yılmaz; Turkey	99 kg	Samuel Andrade; Colombia	98 kg
Clean & Jerk	Ramazan Efe Yılmaz; Turkey	129 kg	Samuel Andrade; Colombia	124 kg	Lissandro Rivero; Venezuela	121 kg
Total	Ramazan Efe Yılmaz; Turkey	228 kg	Samuel Andrade; Colombia	222 kg	Lissandro Rivero; Venezuela	216 kg
61 kg
Snatch	Dionangel Vargas; Venezuela	110 kg	Hovhannes Hovhannisyan; Armenia	108 kg	Wutthiphong Chomkhunthod; Thailand	107 kg
Clean & Jerk	Hovhannes Hovhannisyan; Armenia	134 kg	Dionangel Vargas; Venezuela	134 kg	Wutthiphong Chomkhunthod; Thailand	132 kg
Total	Dionangel Vargas; Venezuela	244 kg	Hovhannes Hovhannisyan; Armenia	242 kg	Wutthiphong Chomkhunthod; Thailand	239 kg
67 kg
Snatch	Akzhol Kurmanbek; Kazakhstan	129 kg	Abdelrahman Hussein; Egypt	128 kg	Alexandr Baldji; Moldova	127 kg
Clean & Jerk	Abdelrahman Hussein; Egypt	158 kg	Akzhol Kurmanbek; Kazakhstan	156 kg	Didarbek Jumabaýew; Turkmenistan	155 kg
Total	Abdelrahman Hussein; Egypt	286 kg	Akzhol Kurmanbek; Kazakhstan	285 kg	Alexandr Baldji; Moldova	282 kg
73 kg
Snatch	Bedabrat Bharali; India	136 kg	Serhii Kotelevskyi; Ukraine	130 kg	Mohammed Al-Halyu; Saudi Arabia	126 kg
Clean & Jerk	Bedabrat Bharali; India	160 kg	Ryan McDonald; United States	159 kg	Serhii Kotelevskyi; Ukraine	153 kg
Total	Bedabrat Bharali; India	296 kg	Ryan McDonald; United States	284 kg	Serhii Kotelevskyi; Ukraine	283 kg
81 kg
Snatch	Moustafa Bakry; Egypt	144 kg	Ruslan Rakhmatjonov; Uzbekistan	139 kg	Sairaj Pardeshi; India	135 kg
Clean & Jerk	Ruslan Rakhmatjonov; Uzbekistan	172 kg	Moustafa Bakry; Egypt	166 kg	Dawid Lisiak; Poland	166 kg
Total	Ruslan Rakhmatjonov; Uzbekistan	311 kg	Moustafa Bakry; Egypt	310 kg	Dawid Lisiak; Poland	301 kg
89 kg
Snatch	Valerik Movsisyan; Armenia	153 kg	Nurdos Sabyr; Kazakhstan	148 kg	Bekzod Gofirjonov; Uzbekistan	141 kg
Clean & Jerk	Nurdos Sabyr; Kazakhstan	185 kg	Bekzod Gofirjonov; Uzbekistan	183 kg	Valerik Movsisyan; Armenia	176 kg
Total	Nurdos Sabyr; Kazakhstan	333 kg	Valerik Movsisyan; Armenia	329 kg	Bekzod Gofirjonov; Uzbekistan	324 kg
96 kg
Snatch	Mohamad Al-Kateb; Syria	147 kg	Mahgoub Elsayed; Egypt	144 kg	Luka Silagadze; Georgia	143 kg
Clean & Jerk	Hazim Al-Lami; Iraq	177 kg	Mohamad Al-Kateb; Syria	174 kg	Luka Silagadze; Georgia	170 kg
Total	Mohamad Al-Kateb; Syria	321 kg	Luka Silagadze; Georgia	313 kg	Hazim Al-Lami; Iraq	312 kg
102 kg
Snatch	Suleyman Jafarow; Turkmenistan	143 kg	Jaba Tkeshelashvili; Georgia	141 kg	Mashal Mahmoud; Egypt	140 kg
Clean & Jerk	Mashal Mahmoud; Syria	174 kg	Mashal Mahmoud; Egypt	170 kg	Suleyman Jafarow; Turkmenistan	170 kg
Total	Suleyman Jafarow; Turkmenistan	313 kg	Mashal Mahmoud; Syria	313 kg	Mashal Mahmoud; Egypt	310 kg
+102 kg
Snatch	Irakli Vekua; Georgia	151 kg	Omadillo Olimov; Uzbekistan	150 kg	Givi Darsavelidze; Georgia	147 kg
Clean & Jerk	Irakli Vekua; Georgia	196 kg	Omadillo Olimov; Uzbekistan	195 kg	Ke Guan-ting; Chinese Taipei	190 kg
Total	Irakli Vekua; Georgia	347 kg	Omadillo Olimov; Uzbekistan	345 kg	Ke Guan-ting; Chinese Taipei	332 kg

=== Women ===
Event	Gold		Silver		Bronze	
40 kg
Snatch	Priteesmita Bhoi; India	57 kg	Jyoshna Sabar; India	56 kg	Fatma Sena Kolçak; Turkey	55 kg
Clean & Jerk	Priteesmita Bhoi; India	76 kg	Şevval İnce; Turkey	70 kg	Oriannis Pirona; Venezuela	69 kg
Total	Priteesmita Bhoi; India	125 kg	Jyoshna Sabar; India	125 kg	Fatma Sena Kolçak; Turkey	120 kg
45 kg
Snatch	Kateryna Malashchuk; Ukraine	67 kg	Lawren Estrada; Colombia	67 kg	Payal; India	65 kg
Clean & Jerk	Lawren Estrada; Colombia	84 kg	Alexandra López; Mexico	83 kg	Payal; India	82 kg
Total	Lawren Estrada; Colombia	151 kg	Payal; India	147 kg	Alexandra López; Mexico	146 kg
49 kg
Snatch	Ogulşat Amanowa; Turkmenistan	77 kg	Lucía González Borrego; Spain	76 kg	Margot Kochetova; France	74 kg
Clean & Jerk	Lucía González Borrego; Spain	93 kg	Beatriz Santos; Brazil	91 kg	Ogulşat Amanowa; Turkmenistan	91 kg
Total	Lucía González Borrego; Spain	169 kg	Ogulşat Amanowa; Turkmenistan	168 kg	Margot Kochetova; France	163 kg
55 kg
Snatch	Nicoleta Cojocaru; Moldova	80 kg	Waka Sato; Japan	79 kg	Marim Abdellatif; Egypt	78 kg
Clean & Jerk	Nicoleta Cojocaru; Moldova	103 kg	Waka Sato; Japan	100 kg	Phuttharak Waiphod; Thailand	100 kg
Total	Nicoleta Cojocaru; Moldova	183 kg	Waka Sato; Japan	179 kg	Jade Morales; United States	175 kg
59 kg
Snatch	Paz Casadevall; Argentina	86 kg	Alina Daderko; Ukraine	84 kg	Marjona Abdumutalova; Uzbekistan	82 kg
Clean & Jerk	Paz Casadevall; Argentina	106 kg	Marjona Abdumutalova; Uzbekistan	100 kg	Alina Daderko; Ukraine	100 kg
Total	Paz Casadevall; Argentina	192 kg	Alina Daderko; Ukraine	184 kg	Marjona Abdumutalova; Uzbekistan	182 kg
64 kg
Snatch	Crystie Femliy; Nauru	90 kg	Claudia Rengifo; Venezuela	89 kg	Tuğba Nur Koz; Turkey	88 kg
Clean & Jerk	Claudia Rengifo; Venezuela	113 kg	Crystie Femliy; Nauru	111 kg	Lidett Miramontes; Mexico	110 kg
Total	Claudia Rengifo; Venezuela	202 kg	Crystie Femliy; Nauru	201 kg	Tuğba Nur Koz; Turkey	193 kg
71 kg
Snatch	Elsayed Abdelkader; Egypt	90 kg	Sahara Ochoa; Venezuela	89 kg	Iga Burda; Poland	88 kg
Clean & Jerk	Camila Cervantes; Mexico	112 kg	Sahara Ochoa; Venezuela	112 kg	Bergrós Björnsdóttir; Iceland	110 kg
Total	Sahara Ochoa; Venezuela	201 kg	Bergrós Björnsdóttir; Iceland	198 kg	Camila Cervantes; Mexico	197 kg
76 kg
Snatch	Ayanat Zhumagali; Kazakhstan	97 kg	Minni Hormavirta; Finland	91 kg	Sanjana; India	90 kg
Clean & Jerk	Ayanat Zhumagali; Kazakhstan	125 kg	Sanjana; India	120 kg	Minni Hormavirta; Finland	120 kg
Total	Ayanat Zhumagali; Kazakhstan	222 kg	Minni Hormavirta; Finland	211 kg	Sanjana; India	210 kg
81 kg
Snatch	Lidysmar Aparicio; Venezuela	94 kg	Laila Rocha; Brazil	90 kg	Sara Dal Bò; Italy	90 kg
Clean & Jerk	Sara Dal Bò; Italy	117 kg	Saniya Ormanbayeva; Kazakhstan	112 kg	Lidysmar Aparicio; Venezuela	112 kg
Total	Sara Dal Bò; Italy	207 kg	Lidysmar Aparicio; Venezuela	206 kg	Saniya Ormanbayeva; Kazakhstan	201 kg
+81 kg
Snatch	Etta Love; Canada	94 kg	Bárbara Mendoza; Venezuela	90 kg	Litia Nacagilevu; New Zealand	90 kg
Clean & Jerk	Etta Love; Canada	138 kg	Angel Billen; Canada	125 kg	Su Sheng-ci; Chinese Taipei	118 kg
Total	Etta Love; Canada	243 kg	Angel Billen; Canada	219 kg	Karen Mancilla; Colombia	208 kg

== Participating nations ==
- Argentina (4)
- Armenia (7)
- Aruba (1)
- Australia (4)
- Belgium (1)
- Bolivia (3)
- Brazil (2)
- Bulgaria (4)
- Canada (3)
- Chile (3)
- Chinese Taipei (11)
- Colombia (15)
- Costa Rica (4)
- Czech Republic (3)
- Ecuador (7)
- Egypt (8)
- Estonia (2)
- Finland (1)
- France (5)
- Georgia (9)
- Great Britain (2)
- Greece (1)
- Iceland (1)
- India (10)
- Iraq (1)
- Italy (3)
- Japan (5)
- Kazakhstan (9)
- Mexico (18)
- Moldova (4)
- Nauru (3)
- New Zealand (4)
- Nicaragua (4)
- Panama (1)
- Peru (19)
- Poland (10)
- Puerto Rico (7)
- Romania (1)
- Saudi Arabia (9)
- Slovakia (2)
- Spain (10)
- Sri Lanka (1)
- Syria (2)
- Thailand (2)
- Turkey (12)
- Turkmenistan (7)
- Ukraine (6)
- United States (11)
- Uzbekistan (6)
- Venezuela (14)

== Men's results ==
=== 49 kg ===
Rank	Athlete	Group	Snatch (kg)				Clean & Jerk (kg)				Total
Rank	Athlete	Group	1	2	3	Rank	1	2	3	Rank	Total
1st place, gold medalist(s)	Freddy Bustillo (COL)	A	82	85	87	1st place, gold medalist(s)	103	107	109	1st place, gold medalist(s)	196
2nd place, silver medalist(s)	Mohammed Al-Ojaian (KSA)	A	82	~~86~~	87	2nd place, silver medalist(s)	101	105	108	2nd place, silver medalist(s)	195
3rd place, bronze medalist(s)	Babulal Hembrom (IND)	A	83	~~86~~	86	5	103	105	107	3rd place, bronze medalist(s)	193
4	Christian Di Maria (ITA)	A	~~83~~	83	86	3rd place, bronze medalist(s)	100	104	~~107~~	4	190
5	Juan Moreno Santiago (ESP)	A	82	~~85~~	86	4	98	102	~~106~~	6	188
6	Elkin Betancourt (ECU)	A	78	82	~~86~~	6	~~103~~	104	~~108~~	5	186
7	Rumen Ivanov (BUL)	A	76	~~80~~	~~81~~	8	95	~~100~~	—	8	171
8	Wei Lian-cheng (TPE)	B	60	66	~~69~~	8	70	~~81~~	81	9	147
9	Jefferson Lino (PER)	B	52	55	58	9	72	76	~~78~~	10	134
10	Luca Arias (CRC)	B	52	~~56~~	~~56~~	10	65	~~70~~	70	11	122
—	Isus Kirilov (BUL)	A	~~84~~	~~85~~	~~85~~	—	96	~~101~~	—	7	—

=== 55 kg ===
Rank	Athlete	Group	Snatch (kg)				Clean & Jerk (kg)				Total
Rank	Athlete	Group	1	2	3	Rank	1	2	3	Rank	Total
1st place, gold medalist(s)	Ramazan Efe Yılmaz (TUR)	A	93	97	99	2nd place, silver medalist(s)	123	126	129	1st place, gold medalist(s)	228
2nd place, silver medalist(s)	Samuel Andrade (COL)	A	94	98	~~101~~	3rd place, bronze medalist(s)	120	124	~~127~~	2nd place, silver medalist(s)	222
3rd place, bronze medalist(s)	Lissandro Rivero (VEN)	A	~~95~~	95	~~99~~	7	118	121	~~125~~	3rd place, bronze medalist(s)	216
4	Maharajan (IND)	A	92	95	98	4	114	117	~~121~~	4	215
5	Danu Secrieru (MDA)	A	93	97	~~100~~	5	~~116~~	116	~~122~~	5	213
6	Narcis Papolți (ROU)	A	96	~~99~~	~~100~~	6	115	~~121~~	~~121~~	6	211
7	Mohammed Al-Wabari (KSA)	A	~~88~~	88	93	8	108	113	~~116~~	7	206
8	Michael Ziss (USA)	A	~~87~~	90	~~94~~	9	110	~~114~~	~~117~~	8	200
9	Jared de la Rosa (MEX)	A	83	86	~~89~~	10	103	106	109	9	195
10	Alan Onofre (ECU)	B	~~82~~	82	85	11	105	108	~~111~~	10	193
11	Kevin Reto (PER)	B	77	81	83	13	97	101	104	11	187
12	Sebastian Rose (USA)	B	77	80	83	12	100	103	~~106~~	12	186
13	Johannes Adam (NRU)	B	80	~~83~~	83	14	100	~~104~~	~~105~~	13	183
14	Fernando Panduro (PER)	B	63	~~66~~	66	15	80	84	87	14	153
—	Nino Simeonov (BUL)	A	97	~~100~~	101	1st place, gold medalist(s)	—	—	—	—	—
—	Kariyawasam Bovithanthri (SRI)	A									DNS

=== 61 kg ===
Rank	Athlete	Group	Snatch (kg)				Clean & Jerk (kg)				Total
Rank	Athlete	Group	1	2	3	Rank	1	2	3	Rank	Total
1st place, gold medalist(s)	Dionangel Vargas (VEN)	A	105	108	110	1st place, gold medalist(s)	130	134	~~137~~	2nd place, silver medalist(s)	244
2nd place, silver medalist(s)	Hovhannes Hovhannisyan (ARM)	A	104	108	~~110~~	2nd place, silver medalist(s)	128	134	~~137~~	1st place, gold medalist(s)	242
3rd place, bronze medalist(s)	Wutthiphong Chomkhunthod (THA)	A	100	105	107	3rd place, bronze medalist(s)	125	130	132	3rd place, bronze medalist(s)	239
4	Dan Dorin Betca (MDA)	A	103	~~107~~	~~109~~	5	122	~~130~~	~~131~~	5	225
5	Abdullah Al-Mohaimeed (KSA)	A	104	~~108~~	~~109~~	4	120	~~129~~	~~129~~	6	224
6	Francisco Mares (MEX)	A	95	~~100~~	~~100~~	6	122	~~127~~	~~128~~	4	217
7	Derrick Webb (ARU)	A	80	~~85~~	~~85~~	8	100	105	108	7	188
8	Álvaro González (NCA)	A	~~70~~	70	75	9	97	103	107	8	182
9	Henry Pasapera (PER)	A	~~67~~	~~67~~	67	10	82	~~86~~	86	9	153
—	José Fernández (PER)	A	80	84	~~87~~	7	—	—	—	—	—

=== 67 kg ===
Rank	Athlete	Group	Snatch (kg)				Clean & Jerk (kg)				Total
Rank	Athlete	Group	1	2	3	Rank	1	2	3	Rank	Total
1st place, gold medalist(s)	Abdelrahman Hussein (EGY)	A	121	125	128	2nd place, silver medalist(s)	152	158	~~167~~	1st place, gold medalist(s)	286
2nd place, silver medalist(s)	Akzhol Kurmanbek (KAZ)	A	123	126	129	1st place, gold medalist(s)	151	156	~~159~~	2nd place, silver medalist(s)	285
3rd place, bronze medalist(s)	Alexandr Baldji (MDA)	A	120	124	127	3rd place, bronze medalist(s)	150	~~155~~	155	4	282
4	Didarbek Jumabaýew (TKM)	A	117	~~120~~	~~121~~	6	150	155	~~157~~	3rd place, bronze medalist(s)	272
5	Narek Grigoryan (ARM)	A	115	120	~~122~~	4	145	~~149~~	~~150~~	6	265
6	Revaz Mildiani (GEO)	A	~~113~~	114	119	5	144	~~149~~	~~149~~	7	263
7	Leri Neparidze (GEO)	A	109	113	~~116~~	9	143	146	149	5	262
8	Mohammed Al-Zawri (KSA)	A	~~113~~	113	~~118~~	10	138	142	~~146~~	8	255
9	Ostap Kovalchuk (UKR)	A	114	116	~~118~~	7	138	~~143~~	~~144~~	9	254
10	Oswaldo Bravo (MEX)	B	~~103~~	103	107	12	127	132	~~135~~	10	239
11	Adam Iafrate (FRA)	B	103	~~106~~	~~106~~	14	121	125	130	11	236
12	Zhuang Yong-sheng (TPE)	B	97	103	106	13	126	~~134~~	~~134~~	12	232
13	Ali Hussin Al-Hawar (KSA)	B	101	106	108	11	123	~~128~~	~~133~~	13	231
14	Gabriel Martin (FRA)	B	95	100	~~104~~	15	120	~~125~~	—	14	220
15	Jasier Ayuso (PUR)	B	~~85~~	85	90	16	108	~~113~~	113	15	203
16	Juan Silva (PER)	B	73	76	~~79~~	17	90	94	~~97~~	16	170
17	Alex Tapia (BOL)	B	50	~~55~~	~~55~~	18	68	75	80	17	130
—	Aarón Vallejo Sires (ESP)	A	115	~~120~~	~~122~~	8	~~135~~	~~135~~	~~135~~	—	—
—	Jamir Morales (NCA)	B									DNS

=== 73 kg ===
Rank	Athlete	Group	Snatch (kg)				Clean & Jerk (kg)				Total
Rank	Athlete	Group	1	2	3	Rank	1	2	3	Rank	Total
1st place, gold medalist(s)	Bedabrat Bharali (IND)	A	128	132	136	1st place, gold medalist(s)	~~154~~	154	160	1st place, gold medalist(s)	296
2nd place, silver medalist(s)	Ryan McDonald (USA)	A	~~122~~	122	125	5	150	154	159	2nd place, silver medalist(s)	284
3rd place, bronze medalist(s)	Serhii Kotelevskyi (UKR)	A	124	127	130	2nd place, silver medalist(s)	148	~~153~~	153	3rd place, bronze medalist(s)	283
4	Mohammed Al-Halyu (KSA)	A	117	123	126	3rd place, bronze medalist(s)	146	~~153~~	~~153~~	6	272
5	Ali Medetbayev (KAZ)	A	116	121	~~125~~	6	145	~~151~~	~~154~~	7	266
6	Adrian Krupa (POL)	A	115	~~120~~	~~121~~	8	141	~~146~~	147	5	262
7	Diego Turner (ARG)	A	110	114	~~117~~	11	142	147	~~150~~	4	261
8	Gabriel Pineda (VEN)	A	~~115~~	~~115~~	115	9	140	~~149~~	~~152~~	11	255
9	Hu Yu-sung (TPE)	B	105	~~113~~	114	10	~~129~~	130	140	10	254
10	Nolan Gallart Lechón (ESP)	B	~~110~~	110	~~114~~	12	136	141	~~145~~	8	251
11	Francisco Cerecero (MEX)	B	105	~~110~~	110	13	135	140	~~145~~	9	250
12	Chen Kuei-hung (TPE)	B	~~110~~	110	115	7	130	134	~~138~~	12	249
13	Oliver Leng (AUS)	B	98	103	~~107~~	14	122	~~128~~	~~130~~	13	225
14	Dylan Palau (PUR)	B	~~85~~	85	~~90~~	15	100	~~105~~	~~105~~	14	185
—	Seryozha Barseghyan (ARM)	A	125	~~129~~	~~129~~	4	—	—	—	—	—
—	Boris Dimitrov (BUL)	B	~~110~~	—	—	—	—	—	—	—	—
—	Atamyrat Annamyradow (TKM)	B									DNS

=== 81 kg ===
Rank	Athlete	Group	Snatch (kg)				Clean & Jerk (kg)				Total
Rank	Athlete	Group	1	2	3	Rank	1	2	3	Rank	Total
1st place, gold medalist(s)	Ruslan Rakhmatjonov (UZB)	A	134	136	139	2nd place, silver medalist(s)	161	~~165~~	172	1st place, gold medalist(s)	311
2nd place, silver medalist(s)	Moustafa Bakry (EGY)	A	138	140	144	1st place, gold medalist(s)	162	166	~~170~~	2nd place, silver medalist(s)	310
3rd place, bronze medalist(s)	Dawid Lisiak (POL)	A	128	133	135	4	161	164	166	3rd place, bronze medalist(s)	301
4	Sairaj Pardeshi (IND)	A	128	133	135	3rd place, bronze medalist(s)	160	163	165	4	300
5	Ashot Gasparyan (ARM)	A	125	~~130~~	130	9	155	~~160~~	160	5	290
6	Florian Dąbek (POL)	A	120	125	130	8	146	154	159	6	289
7	Giga Tsukhishvili (GEO)	A	121	126	131	6	149	154	~~158~~	7	285
8	Ángel Castellano (MEX)	B	125	~~130~~	130	7	~~153~~	~~153~~	153	8	283
9	Juan Marín (COL)	A	123	128	132	5	142	~~150~~	~~150~~	10	274
10	Jan Tchurz (CZE)	B	111	116	120	11	137	143	~~147~~	9	263
11	Andrés Salazar (MEX)	B	112	117	120	12	135	140	~~144~~	11	260
12	Hector López (PER)	B	85	90	~~95~~	14	113	116	120	12	210
13	Julio Martínez (PUR)	B	~~77~~	77	81	15	105	110	115	13	196
14	Jhamil Gonzales (BOL)	B	53	57	61	16	70	80	85	14	146
—	Kale Bunce (USA)	B	110	115	~~120~~	13	~~134~~	~~134~~	~~135~~	—	—
—	Samuele Di Marzio (ITA)	A	~~125~~	125	~~131~~	10	—	—	—	—	—

=== 89 kg ===
Rank	Athlete	Group	Snatch (kg)				Clean & Jerk (kg)				Total
Rank	Athlete	Group	1	2	3	Rank	1	2	3	Rank	Total
1st place, gold medalist(s)	Nurdos Sabyr (KAZ)	A	~~143~~	143	148	2nd place, silver medalist(s)	175	182	185	1st place, gold medalist(s)	333
2nd place, silver medalist(s)	Valerik Movsisyan (ARM)	A	145	150	153	1st place, gold medalist(s)	171	176	~~182~~	3rd place, bronze medalist(s)	329
3rd place, bronze medalist(s)	Bekzod Gofirjonov (UZB)	A	~~140~~	141	~~148~~	3rd place, bronze medalist(s)	174	183	~~186~~	2nd place, silver medalist(s)	324
4	Vicente Braulio (ECU)	A	~~135~~	135	~~140~~	4	155	~~161~~	163	4	298
5	Jhon Murillo (COL)	A	130	~~134~~	134	5	155	~~160~~	162	5	296
6	Szymon Grzymała (POL)	A	122	127	131	7	150	156	159	6	290
7	Yoshiki Yamashita (JPN)	A	120	124	~~128~~	10	151	155	~~160~~	7	279
8	David Calvo (ARG)	A	120	~~126~~	126	8	~~150~~	150	~~156~~	11	276
9	Toumu Sannomiya (JPN)	B	115	~~120~~	120	12	145	150	154	9	274
10	Dryden Parchewsky (CAN)	B	119	122	125	9	148	~~152~~	~~154~~	12	273
11	Matías Moreno (CHI)	B	115	~~119~~	119	13	140	147	154	8	273
12	Abbas Al-Mahdi (KSA)	A	~~118~~	118	~~123~~	14	150	~~157~~	~~157~~	10	268
13	Matej Cepko (SVK)	B	113	117	121	11	~~135~~	~~135~~	135	13	256
14	César Alemán (PER)	B	85	90	95	15	105	110	~~115~~	14	205
—	Jumber Bekoshvili (GEO)	A	125	129	132	6	~~155~~	~~155~~	~~155~~	—	—
—	Luis Alpuche (MEX)	A									DNS

=== 96 kg ===
Rank	Athlete	Group	Snatch (kg)				Clean & Jerk (kg)				Total
Rank	Athlete	Group	1	2	3	Rank	1	2	3	Rank	Total
1st place, gold medalist(s)	Mohamad Al-Kateb (SYR)	A	138	143	147	1st place, gold medalist(s)	168	~~174~~	174	2nd place, silver medalist(s)	321
2nd place, silver medalist(s)	Luka Silagadze (GEO)	A	~~137~~	137	143	3rd place, bronze medalist(s)	166	170	~~174~~	3rd place, bronze medalist(s)	313
3rd place, bronze medalist(s)	Hazim Al-Lami (IRQ)	A	135	~~140~~	~~140~~	6	171	~~175~~	177	1st place, gold medalist(s)	312
4	Mahgoub Elsayed (EGY)	A	136	141	144	2nd place, silver medalist(s)	~~166~~	167	~~172~~	5	311
5	Angel Lara (MEX)	A	127	132	~~135~~	7	162	166	169	4	301
6	Emre Kartal (TUR)	A	136	~~139~~	~~140~~	5	163	~~170~~	~~172~~	6	299
7	César Luna (VEN)	A	122	~~127~~	128	8	152	160	~~165~~	7	288
8	Huang Zheng-xian (TPE)	A	115	123	~~127~~	9	140	152	~~161~~	8	275
9	Kait Viks (EST)	B	98	101	~~104~~	10	118	121	~~125~~	9	222
10	Jhosue Castro (PER)	B	90	95	~~100~~	11	110	115	120	10	215
11	Santiago Rodríguez (CRC)	B	75	~~80~~	80	12	95	100	~~105~~	11	180
—	Bekbolat Kaliuly (KAZ)	A	135	139	142	4	~~173~~	~~173~~	~~173~~	—	—

=== 102 kg ===
Rank	Athlete	Group	Snatch (kg)				Clean & Jerk (kg)				Total
Rank	Athlete	Group	1	2	3	Rank	1	2	3	Rank	Total
1st place, gold medalist(s)	Suleyman Jafarow (TKM)	A	137	141	143	1st place, gold medalist(s)	165	~~170~~	170	3rd place, bronze medalist(s)	313
2nd place, silver medalist(s)	Ahmad Shammaa (SYR)	A	134	139	~~142~~	4	~~169~~	171	174	1st place, gold medalist(s)	313
3rd place, bronze medalist(s)	Mashal Mahmoud (EGY)	A	130	136	140	3rd place, bronze medalist(s)	161	~~170~~	170	2nd place, silver medalist(s)	310
4	Jaba Tkeshelashvili (GEO)	A	~~135~~	135	141	2nd place, silver medalist(s)	162	~~168~~	168	4	309
5	Abdullah Al-Qaisoom (KSA)	A	131	~~138~~	138	6	162	~~168~~	~~170~~	6	300
6	Didar Abdulla (KAZ)	A	130	135	138	5	160	~~165~~	~~165~~	7	298
7	Davit Kirvalidze (GEO)	A	125	129	132	8	155	160	~~163~~	8	292
8	Kodai Tatsumi (JPN)	A	120	126	~~131~~	9	158	165	~~167~~	5	291
9	Oliver Jabkiewicz (POL)	A	135	~~140~~	~~142~~	7	~~155~~	155	~~161~~	9	290
10	Jan Matějka (CZE)	A	~~108~~	108	112	10	138	143	147	10	259

=== +102 kg ===
Rank	Athlete	Group	Snatch (kg)				Clean & Jerk (kg)				Total
Rank	Athlete	Group	1	2	3	Rank	1	2	3	Rank	Total
1st place, gold medalist(s)	Irakli Vekua (GEO)	A	146	149	151	1st place, gold medalist(s)	187	196	~~200~~	1st place, gold medalist(s)	347
2nd place, silver medalist(s)	Omadillo Olimov (UZB)	A	142	146	150	2nd place, silver medalist(s)	186	195	~~198~~	2nd place, silver medalist(s)	345
3rd place, bronze medalist(s)	Ke Guan-ting (TPE)	A	135	139	142	7	180	185	190	3rd place, bronze medalist(s)	332
4	Vladyslav Holovanov (UKR)	A	137	141	~~145~~	8	176	181	186	4	327
5	Givi Darsavelidze (GEO)	A	141	145	147	3rd place, bronze medalist(s)	173	~~178~~	179	5	326
6	Yedil Askarov (KAZ)	A	~~137~~	137	144	4	166	174	~~183~~	7	318
7	Ömer Gürmeriç (TUR)	A	~~137~~	137	142	6	170	175	~~179~~	6	317
8	Arda Bıyık (TUR)	A	~~137~~	137	143	5	~~172~~	~~173~~	173	9	316
9	Gagik Mkrtchyan (ARM)	A	135	~~140~~	140	9	~~173~~	173	~~178~~	8	313
10	José Urrego (COL)	A	128	132	~~135~~	11	162	167	~~172~~	10	299
11	José García Rodrigues (ESP)	A	132	~~138~~	138	10	160	~~165~~	~~165~~	12	298
12	Muntathir Al-Mohsin (KSA)	A	~~120~~	120	126	12	162	~~166~~	~~167~~	11	288
13	Raúl Rivera (PUR)	A	90	95	100	13	115	121	125	13	225
—	Isyss Schuster (NZL)	A	—	—	—	—	—	—	—	—	—

== Women's results ==
=== 40 kg ===
Rank	Athlete	Group	Snatch (kg)				Clean & Jerk (kg)				Total
Rank	Athlete	Group	1	2	3	Rank	1	2	3	Rank	Total
1st place, gold medalist(s)	Priteesmita Bhoi (IND)	A	54	~~57~~	57	1st place, gold medalist(s)	68	72	76	1st place, gold medalist(s)	133
2nd place, silver medalist(s)	Jyoshna Sabar (IND)	A	54	56	~~58~~	2nd place, silver medalist(s)	~~66~~	66	69	4	125
3rd place, bronze medalist(s)	Fatma Sena Kolçak (TUR)	A	53	55	~~57~~	3rd place, bronze medalist(s)	63	65	~~67~~	8	120
4	Romina Nava (MEX)	B	48	50	52	4	63	66	~~68~~	5	118
5	Luirmar Millán (VEN)	A	50	52	~~55~~	5	62	66	~~69~~	6	118
6	Estefany Montejano (MEX)	A	47	~~50~~	~~50~~	8	65	~~68~~	~~68~~	7	112
7	Julia Wałęsa (POL)	B	45	47	~~49~~	7	57	60	~~63~~	9	107
8	Doménica Endara (ECU)	B	44	47	~~49~~	6	54	57	60	11	107
9	Yuleysis Sánchez (COL)	B	42	45	~~48~~	9	53	57	60	10	105
—	Oriannis Pirona (VEN)	A	~~55~~	~~55~~	~~55~~	—	~~65~~	65	69	3rd place, bronze medalist(s)	—
—	Şevval İnce (TUR)	A	~~50~~	~~50~~	~~50~~	—	65	67	70	2nd place, silver medalist(s)	—

=== 45 kg ===
Rank	Athlete	Group	Snatch (kg)				Clean & Jerk (kg)				Total
Rank	Athlete	Group	1	2	3	Rank	1	2	3	Rank	Total
1st place, gold medalist(s)	Lawren Estrada (COL)	A	62	65	67	2nd place, silver medalist(s)	80	82	84	1st place, gold medalist(s)	151
2nd place, silver medalist(s)	Payal (IND)	A	63	65	~~68~~	3rd place, bronze medalist(s)	78	80	82	3rd place, bronze medalist(s)	147
3rd place, bronze medalist(s)	Alexandra López (MEX)	A	58	61	63	6	79	81	83	2nd place, silver medalist(s)	146
4	Kateryna Malashchuk (UKR)	A	67	~~69~~	~~69~~	1st place, gold medalist(s)	~~77~~	~~77~~	77	6	144
5	Şabnam Kerimbaýewa (TKM)	A	62	64	~~66~~	4	78	~~81~~	~~81~~	4	142
6	Wiliandrys Caldera (VEN)	A	57	~~62~~	62	8	78	~~81~~	~~81~~	5	140
7	Aysu Bektas (TUR)	A	~~63~~	63	~~66~~	5	~~73~~	~~75~~	75	7	138
8	María Cervera Jiménez (ESP)	A	58	~~61~~	63	7	70	73	~~75~~	8	136
9	Lorena Vázquez López (ESP)	A	~~61~~	~~62~~	62	9	72	~~75~~	~~75~~	9	134
10	Ivana Vélez (ECU)	B	54	57	~~59~~	10	64	68	71	10	128
11	Yalena Valdiris (COL)	B	~~50~~	50	~~53~~	12	63	67	70	11	120
12	Alexine Bizeau (FRA)	B	51	53	~~55~~	11	~~59~~	59	~~62~~	12	112
13	Selly Vásquez (PER)	B	40	43	45	13	50	~~53~~	53	13	98
14	Andrea Domínguez (PER)	B	35	~~38~~	~~40~~	14	45	48	51	14	86

=== 49 kg ===
Rank	Athlete	Group	Snatch (kg)				Clean & Jerk (kg)				Total
Rank	Athlete	Group	1	2	3	Rank	1	2	3	Rank	Total
1st place, gold medalist(s)	Lucía González Borrego (ESP)	A	73	76	~~78~~	2nd place, silver medalist(s)	~~91~~	91	93	1st place, gold medalist(s)	169
2nd place, silver medalist(s)	Ogulşat Amanowa (TKM)	A	73	75	77	1st place, gold medalist(s)	89	~~90~~	91	3rd place, bronze medalist(s)	168
3rd place, bronze medalist(s)	Margot Kochetova (FRA)	A	71	74	~~76~~	3rd place, bronze medalist(s)	84	87	89	4	163
4	Beatriz Santos (BRA)	A	68	71	~~73~~	6	87	~~90~~	91	2nd place, silver medalist(s)	162
5	Kenia May Dzul (MEX)	A	70	73	~~75~~	4	~~86~~	86	~~90~~	8	159
6	Katerin Olivera (PER)	A	~~70~~	70	~~73~~	7	86	88	~~90~~	5	158
7	Maria Stratoudaki (GRE)	A	65	70	72	5	85	~~90~~	~~92~~	9	157
8	Habiba Abdelfattah (EGY)	A	69	~~73~~	~~74~~	8	82	87	~~90~~	7	156
9	Asmita Dhone (IND)	A	~~63~~	63	~~66~~	15	81	85	88	6	151
10	Bhargavi (IND)	A	65	~~68~~	~~68~~	11	83	~~87~~	~~88~~	10	148
11	Evelyn Gómez Sosa (ESP)	A	66	~~69~~	69	9	78	~~82~~	~~82~~	13	147
12	Brynn Cupp (USA)	B	61	63	65	10	77	~~79~~	80	11	145
13	Mayra Parra (COL)	A	63	~~65~~	65	12	77	80	~~82~~	12	145
14	Pan Mei-chin (TPE)	B	~~60~~	60	63	14	73	77	~~80~~	14	140
15	Florette Degez (FRA)	B	61	64	~~66~~	13	~~74~~	~~74~~	75	16	139
16	Valeria Chirino (VEN)	B	58	61	~~64~~	16	70	73	~~75~~	17	134
17	Amelia Phillips (USA)	B	58	~~60~~	~~60~~	19	72	74	76	15	134
18	Kokona Kawasaki (JPN)	B	60	~~63~~	~~63~~	17	69	~~71~~	~~71~~	19	129
19	Jo-Beth Deireragea (NRU)	B	55	58	59	18	68	70	~~73~~	18	129
20	Celine Huynh (AUS)	B	55	~~58~~	~~58~~	20	68	~~71~~	~~73~~	20	123
21	Isabella Lowe-King (AUS)	B	55	~~57~~	~~57~~	21	68	~~71~~	~~72~~	21	123
22	Danna Herrera (CRC)	B	45	48	~~50~~	22	55	58	60	22	108
—	Chan Yu-jen (TPE)	B									DNS

=== 55 kg ===
Rank	Athlete	Group	Snatch (kg)				Clean & Jerk (kg)				Total
Rank	Athlete	Group	1	2	3	Rank	1	2	3	Rank	Total
1st place, gold medalist(s)	Nicoleta Cojocaru (MDA)	A	~~76~~	77	80	1st place, gold medalist(s)	96	100	103	1st place, gold medalist(s)	183
2nd place, silver medalist(s)	Waka Sato (JPN)	A	76	~~78~~	79	2nd place, silver medalist(s)	100	~~105~~	~~105~~	2nd place, silver medalist(s)	179
3rd place, bronze medalist(s)	Jade Morales (USA)	A	72	~~76~~	76	5	95	99	~~101~~	5	175
4	Roxines Polanco (VEN)	A	73	~~76~~	~~77~~	9	~~93~~	93	100	4	173
5	Kelly López (MEX)	A	74	~~77~~	~~78~~	6	93	96	~~100~~	6	170
6	Ivanis Silva (VEN)	A	73	75	77	4	82	88	92	8	169
7	Lyudmila Elefteriadi (UZB)	A	~~74~~	74	~~77~~	7	~~93~~	93	~~98~~	7	167
8	Yashira Molina (ARG)	B	68	71	73	8	~~86~~	86	91	9	164
9	Andżelika Młynarczyk (POL)	A	~~71~~	72	~~75~~	10	87	~~93~~	~~93~~	11	159
10	Sharon Díaz (COL)	B	65	~~68~~	~~68~~	11	85	90	~~92~~	10	155
11	Mayagozel Hurmenowa (TKM)	B	~~63~~	63	65	12	75	79	~~82~~	12	144
12	Eloisa Vásquez (BOL)	B	~~56~~	56	~~60~~	15	74	77	~~80~~	13	133
13	Lizquet Michi (PER)	B	53	56	58	13	66	70	~~72~~	15	128
14	Ernnesty Jirón (NCA)	B	~~57~~	57	~~60~~	14	65	~~71~~	71	14	128
—	Phuttharak Waiphod (THA)	A	~~76~~	~~76~~	~~76~~	—	95	100	~~102~~	3rd place, bronze medalist(s)	—
—	Marim Abdellatif (EGY)	A	74	78	~~81~~	3rd place, bronze medalist(s)	~~93~~	~~93~~	~~93~~	—	—
—	Jineth Pérez (COL)	A	—	—	—	—	—	—	—	—	—

=== 59 kg ===
Rank	Athlete	Group	Snatch (kg)				Clean & Jerk (kg)				Total
Rank	Athlete	Group	1	2	3	Rank	1	2	3	Rank	Total
1st place, gold medalist(s)	Paz Casadevall (ARG)	A	81	83	86	1st place, gold medalist(s)	100	103	106	1st place, gold medalist(s)	192
2nd place, silver medalist(s)	Alina Daderko (UKR)	A	82	84	~~86~~	2nd place, silver medalist(s)	97	~~100~~	100	3rd place, bronze medalist(s)	184
3rd place, bronze medalist(s)	Marjona Abdumutalova (UZB)	A	80	~~82~~	82	3rd place, bronze medalist(s)	100	~~103~~	~~103~~	2nd place, silver medalist(s)	182
4	Darya Balabayuk (KAZ)	A	78	81	~~83~~	4	~~98~~	99	~~102~~	4	180
5	Yara Coneo (COL)	A	~~76~~	76	~~78~~	5	93	97	~~101~~	6	173
6	Emma Heck (USA)	A	~~74~~	74	~~78~~	7	94	98	~~101~~	5	172
7	Andrada Galvao Pereira (BEL)	A	70	~~75~~	75	6	88	93	~~95~~	7	168
8	Gracie Rice (USA)	B	65	68	~~71~~	9	83	86	~~90~~	8	154
9	Phoebe Davis (GBR)	A	72	~~75~~	~~75~~	8	81	~~83~~	~~83~~	11	153
10	Zybagul Soýmuşewa (TKM)	B	63	66	~~68~~	10	79	82	85	9	151
11	Mayumi Silva (PER)	B	65	~~68~~	~~69~~	11	77	80	~~83~~	12	145
—	Laura Kantorová (CZE)	B	~~64~~	~~64~~	~~65~~	—	~~78~~	81	~~86~~	10	—

=== 64 kg ===
Rank	Athlete	Group	Snatch (kg)				Clean & Jerk (kg)				Total
Rank	Athlete	Group	1	2	3	Rank	1	2	3	Rank	Total
1st place, gold medalist(s)	Claudia Rengifo (VEN)	A	89	~~92~~	~~92~~	2nd place, silver medalist(s)	109	~~112~~	113	1st place, gold medalist(s)	202
2nd place, silver medalist(s)	Crystie Femliy (NRU)	A	86	90	~~92~~	1st place, gold medalist(s)	108	111	~~114~~	2nd place, silver medalist(s)	201
3rd place, bronze medalist(s)	Tuğba Nur Koz (TUR)	A	85	88	~~91~~	3rd place, bronze medalist(s)	95	102	105	5	193
4	Yezda Akar (TUR)	A	77	80	83	6	106	~~110~~	~~111~~	4	189
5	Lidett Miramontes (MEX)	A	78	~~81~~	~~83~~	8	106	110	~~113~~	3rd place, bronze medalist(s)	188
6	Meri Misakyan (ARM)	A	80	84	~~86~~	4	102	~~110~~	~~110~~	6	186
7	Julia Choińska (POL)	A	80	83	~~86~~	5	95	99	102	7	185
8	Claudia Cabrera Estévez (ESP)	B	~~70~~	70	73	10	95	98	100	8	173
9	Mónica Uvalle (MEX)	A	72	~~75~~	75	9	92	95	~~99~~	9	170
10	Ráchel Závacká (SVK)	A	69	72	~~74~~	11	86	~~90~~	90	11	162
11	Autumn Sands (USA)	B	~~70~~	~~70~~	71	12	90	~~93~~	~~93~~	10	161
12	Jazmin Maldonado (PUR)	B	50	55	60	13	70	75	78	12	138
13	Abril Gamarra (PER)	B	53	56	~~60~~	14	66	70	73	13	129
—	Melany Minda (ECU)	B	75	80	~~82~~	7	—	—	—	—	—

=== 71 kg ===
Rank	Athlete	Group	Snatch (kg)				Clean & Jerk (kg)				Total
Rank	Athlete	Group	1	2	3	Rank	1	2	3	Rank	Total
1st place, gold medalist(s)	Sahara Ochoa (VEN)	A	86	89	~~91~~	2nd place, silver medalist(s)	109	112	~~115~~	2nd place, silver medalist(s)	201
2nd place, silver medalist(s)	Bergrós Björnsdóttir (ISL)	A	85	88	~~91~~	4	110	~~114~~	~~115~~	3rd place, bronze medalist(s)	198
3rd place, bronze medalist(s)	Camila Cervantes (MEX)	A	80	~~84~~	85	7	108	112	~~115~~	1st place, gold medalist(s)	197
4	Iga Burda (POL)	A	85	88	~~91~~	3rd place, bronze medalist(s)	103	~~108~~	108	5	196
5	Elsayed Abdelkader (EGY)	A	83	87	90	1st place, gold medalist(s)	103	~~107~~	~~108~~	8	193
6	Athenea Santana Cansino (ESP)	A	84	~~87~~	~~89~~	8	105	108	~~111~~	4	192
7	Madeline Rosher (GBR)	A	~~85~~	85	~~88~~	6	103	106	~~110~~	6	191
8	Taiamoni Pakoti (AUS)	A	76	81	84	9	~~100~~	100	105	7	189
9	Dilnoza Fayzullaeva (UZB)	A	85	~~88~~	~~88~~	5	103	~~106~~	~~106~~	9	188
10	Constanza Mayorga (CHI)	A	73	~~78~~	78	12	92	99	100	11	178
11	Kelly Aparicio (PAN)	B	75	~~79~~	~~80~~	14	97	100	102	10	177
12	Brooke Buzzell (USA)	B	71	74	77	13	93	~~97~~	98	13	175
13	Itzel Morales (PUR)	B	~~76~~	76	80	10	~~93~~	93	~~95~~	15	173
14	Chen Tzu-wei (TPE)	B	~~75~~	75	78	11	~~95~~	95	~~98~~	14	173
15	Madeleine Agnew (NZL)	B	70	73	~~76~~	16	92	~~96~~	99	12	172
16	Chao Hao-yu (TPE)	B	73	~~78~~	~~79~~	15	86	~~99~~	~~101~~	16	159
17	Romina Saavedra (PER)	B	60	63	65	17	76	~~80~~	81	18	146
18	Mia Quiñones (PUR)	B	60	~~65~~	~~67~~	18	75	80	85	17	145
19	Damaris Palacios (PER)	B	55	58	60	19	72	76	80	19	140
20	Isabella Gonzales (CRC)	B	53	57	~~60~~	20	65	~~70~~	70	20	127

=== 76 kg ===
Rank	Athlete	Group	Snatch (kg)				Clean & Jerk (kg)				Total
Rank	Athlete	Group	1	2	3	Rank	1	2	3	Rank	Total
1st place, gold medalist(s)	Ayanat Zhumagali (KAZ)	A	90	94	97	1st place, gold medalist(s)	117	121	125	1st place, gold medalist(s)	222
2nd place, silver medalist(s)	Minni Hormavirta (FIN)	A	88	91	~~95~~	2nd place, silver medalist(s)	114	118	120	3rd place, bronze medalist(s)	211
3rd place, bronze medalist(s)	Sanjana (IND)	A	~~87~~	87	90	3rd place, bronze medalist(s)	112	116	120	2nd place, silver medalist(s)	210
4	Valeria Iñiguez (MEX)	A	83	87	~~90~~	4	106	110	113	4	200
5	Maricela Segura (COL)	A	82	85	~~88~~	6	105	~~110~~	~~114~~	5	190
6	Hilal Gök (TUR)	A	86	~~89~~	~~91~~	5	97	~~100~~	~~100~~	7	183
7	Paola Cibrian (MEX)	A	77	80	82	8	99	~~104~~	~~104~~	6	181
—	Zeynep Nur Pehlivan (TUR)	A	79	83	~~88~~	7	~~107~~	~~107~~	~~111~~	—	—

=== 81 kg ===
Rank	Athlete	Group	Snatch (kg)				Clean & Jerk (kg)				Total
Rank	Athlete	Group	1	2	3	Rank	1	2	3	Rank	Total
1st place, gold medalist(s)	Sara Dal Bò (ITA)	A	85	~~90~~	90	3rd place, bronze medalist(s)	110	~~117~~	117	1st place, gold medalist(s)	207
2nd place, silver medalist(s)	Lidysmar Aparicio (VEN)	A	87	91	94	1st place, gold medalist(s)	108	~~112~~	112	3rd place, bronze medalist(s)	206
3rd place, bronze medalist(s)	Saniya Ormanbayeva (KAZ)	A	86	89	~~92~~	4	112	~~119~~	~~119~~	2nd place, silver medalist(s)	201
4	Laila Rocha (BRA)	A	87	90	~~92~~	2nd place, silver medalist(s)	101	~~106~~	106	6	196
5	Gebreel Abdelhamid (EGY)	A	80	85	~~88~~	5	105	111	~~113~~	4	196
6	Julia Machniewska (POL)	A	81	84	~~87~~	6	101	105	108	5	192
7	Heidy Herrera (COL)	A	78	81	~~85~~	7	95	~~100~~	~~100~~	10	176
8	Victoria Barrientos (CHI)	A	73	78	~~82~~	8	93	98	~~101~~	8	176
9	Beyzanur Apaydın (TUR)	A	~~75~~	~~75~~	76	9	93	97	~~99~~	9	173
10	Lucero Martínez (NCA)	A	65	72	~~78~~	10	87	93	99	7	171
11	Camila Zamora (PER)	A	55	59	62	11	75	79	~~82~~	11	141

=== +81 kg ===
Rank	Athlete	Group	Snatch (kg)				Clean & Jerk (kg)				Total
Rank	Athlete	Group	1	2	3	Rank	1	2	3	Rank	Total
1st place, gold medalist(s)	Etta Love (CAN)	A	100	105	~~109~~	1st place, gold medalist(s)	126	132	138	1st place, gold medalist(s)	243
2nd place, silver medalist(s)	Angel Billen (CAN)	A	90	~~94~~	94	4	117	120	125	2nd place, silver medalist(s)	219
3rd place, bronze medalist(s)	Karen Mancilla (COL)	A	85	88	91	6	108	113	117	4	208
4	Bárbara Mendoza (VEN)	A	88	92	95	2nd place, silver medalist(s)	109	112	~~115~~	6	207
5	Sofiia Kozak (UKR)	A	91	~~94~~	~~95~~	5	110	114	~~118~~	5	205
6	Su Sheng-ci (TPE)	A	80	84	87	7	110	115	118	3rd place, bronze medalist(s)	205
7	Litia Nacagilevu (NZL)	A	90	94	~~97~~	3rd place, bronze medalist(s)	105	110	—	7	204
8	Mollie King (NZL)	A	78	82	84	8	97	~~101~~	105	8	189
9	Thaira Castro (ECU)	A	78	81	~~85~~	9	90	94	97	9	178
10	Inger Prants (EST)	A	~~65~~	~~65~~	65	10	76	80	~~83~~	10	145
11	Danna Terrones (PER)	A	54	58	~~61~~	11	63	67	71	11	129
