= Priteesmita Bhoi =

Indian weightlifter (born 2008)

Preetismita Bhoi
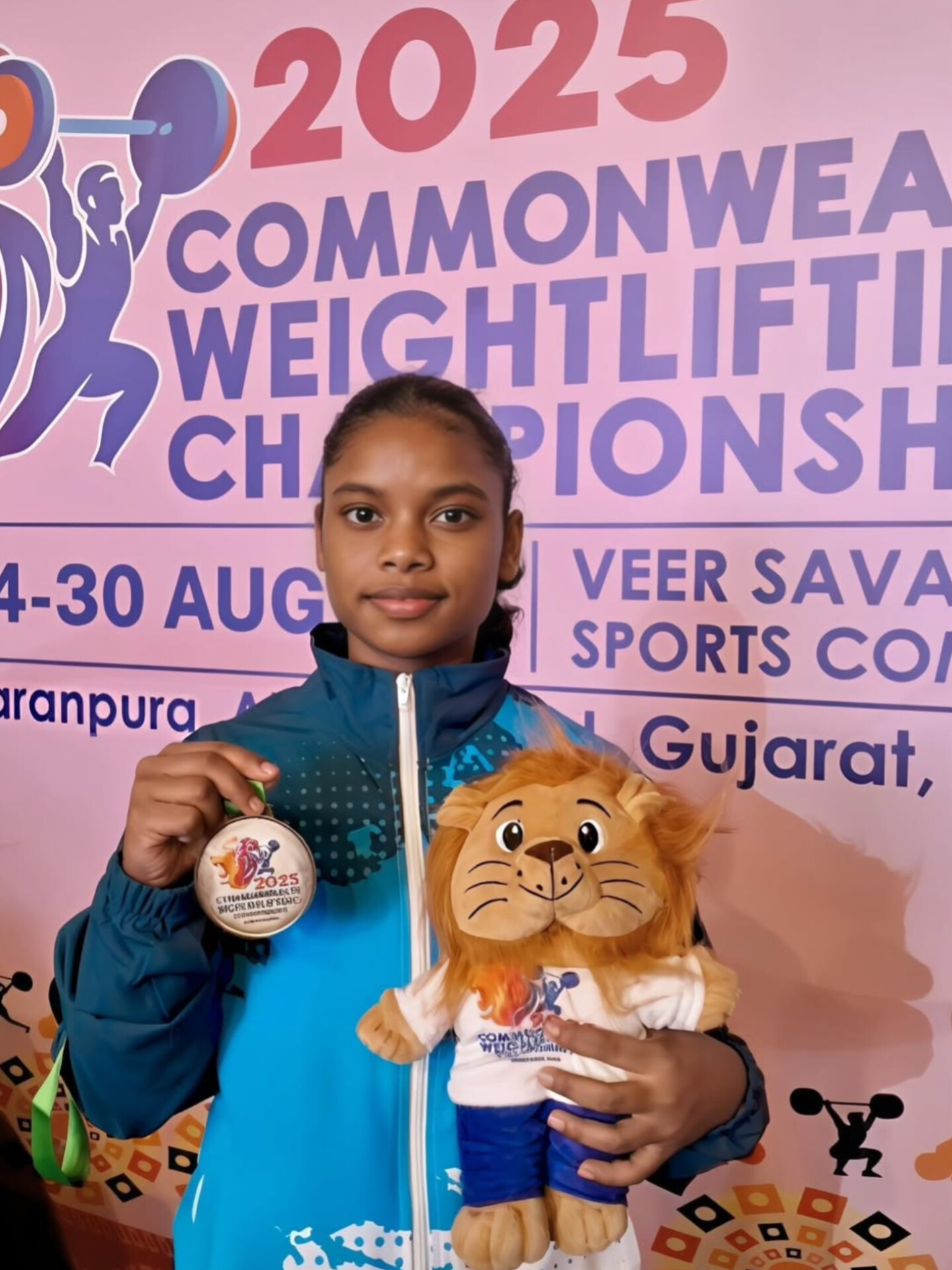
- Bhoi at the 2025 Commonwealth Youth Championships

Personal information
- Born: 14 November 2008 (age 17) Dhenkanal, Odisha, India

Achievements and titles
- Personal best(s): Snatch: 66 kg (2025); Clean & Jerk: 92 kg WR (2025); Total: 158 kg (2025)
Medal record
Women's weightlifting
Representing India
Youth World Championships
| Gold medal – first place | 2024 Lima | 40 kg |
Asian Youth Games
| Gold medal – first place | 2025 Bahrain | 44 kg C&J |
| Silver medal – second place | 2025 Bahrain | 44 kg Snatch |
Asian Youth Championships
| Silver medal – second place | 2024 Doha | 45 kg |
Commonwealth Youth Championships
| Gold medal – first place | 2025 Ahmedabad | 44 kg |

Preetismita Bhoi (born 14 November 2008) is an Indian weightlifter. Bhoi created a Youth World Record in Clean & Jerk with a lift of 92 kg at the 2025 Asian Youth Games in the 44 kg category, earning a gold medal.

== Early life ==
Bhoi was born in Dhenkanal, Odisha. She lost her father when she was two, and she and her sister, Vidusmita, were raised by their mother, Jamuna Devi. Weightlifting coach Gopal Krishna Das witnessed the two sisters participating in a track event and persuaded their mother to let them train as weightlifters.

== Career ==
In August 2023, the Talent Identification and Development Committee of the Khelo India initiative selected Bhoi as one of the weightlifters to be designated a Khelo India Athlete, thereby receiving support for training and in competitions.

Bhoi set a new youth world record of 76 kg in the Clean & Jerk category, on her way to winning gold in the 2024 Youth World Weightlifting Championships in the 40 kg event.

In 2025, Bhoi lifted a total of 150 kg (63 kg snatch and 87 kg clean and jerk) to win the youth 44 kg women's category at the Commonwealth Weightlifting Championships. She followed that up with a gold in the 44 kg category at the 2025 Asian Youth Games, establishing a World Youth record in the process.

== Major results ==
| Year | Venue | Weight | Snatch (kg) | Clean & Jerk (kg) | Total | Rank |
Asian Youth Games
| 2025 | Manama, Bahrain | 44 kg | 66 | 92 WR | 158 | 1 |
Commonwealth Youth Championships
| 2025 | Ahmedabad, India | 44 kg | 63 | 87 | 150 | 1 |
Asian Youth Championships
| 2024 | Doha, Qatar | 45 kg | | 85 | | |
Youth World Championships
| 2024 | Lima, Peru | 40 kg | 57 | 76 WR | 133 | 1 |
Khelo India Youth Games
| 2023 | Chennai, India | 40 kg | 52 | 64 | 116 | 2 |
IWLF National Championships
| 2024 | Nagrota Bagwan, India | 45 kg | 57 | 82 | 139 | 2 (Youth) and 3 (Junior) |
| 2023 | Itanagar, India | 40 kg | 55 | 67 | 122 | 2 |
Khelo India National Women's Championships
| 2023 | Patna, India | 40 kg | 49 | 61 | 110 | 2 |
IWLF National Youth Championships
| 2022-23 | Nagercoil, India | 40 kg | 50 | 63 | 113 | 3 |

== Awards and honours ==
| Year | Award | Category | Result | Ref(s) |
|---|---|---|---|---|
| 2024 | Rashtriya Bal Puraskar | Highest civilian honour for children | Won | |
