= Anish Sarkar =

Indian chess player (born 2021)

Personal information
- Born: 26 January 2021 (age 5) Kolkata, India

Chess career
- Country: India
- FIDE rating: 1560 (August 2026)
- Peak rating: 1584 (June 2026)

Anish Sarkar (born 26 January 2021) is an Indian chess player. He is the world's second youngest FIDE rated player. In 2024, Sarkar became the youngest to be awarded the Pradhan Mantri Rashtriya Bal Puraskar, aged 3.

== Chess career ==
Sarkar's interest in chess began in January 2024. He was shortly afterwards placed in a special training group at a chess academy led by India's second-ever grandmaster Dibyendu Barua.

In September 2024, he played at the 1st SXCCAA All Bengal Rapid Rating Open 2024, where he earned his first rating (in rapid) and had the chance to play in a simul against grandmaster Arjun Erigaisi.

In November 2024, he became the world's youngest FIDE rated player at the age of 3 years and 10 months. He had played at the West Bengal U9 Championship in the previous month, finishing 24th in a field of 140 players with a score of 5.5/8. He had defeated two rated players (Arav Chatterjee and Ahilaan Baishya) in the final two rounds. He then played in a West Bengal U13 Championship, after which he earned his first official FIDE rating of 1556. This broke the record of Tejas Tiwari, who was previously the youngest rated FIDE player at the age of 5. In December 2025, Sarwagya Singh Kushwaha became the youngest FIDE rated player at the age of 3 years and 7 month by breaking previous record set by Anish.
