= Heart-type fatty acid binding protein =

Protein found in humans

FABP3
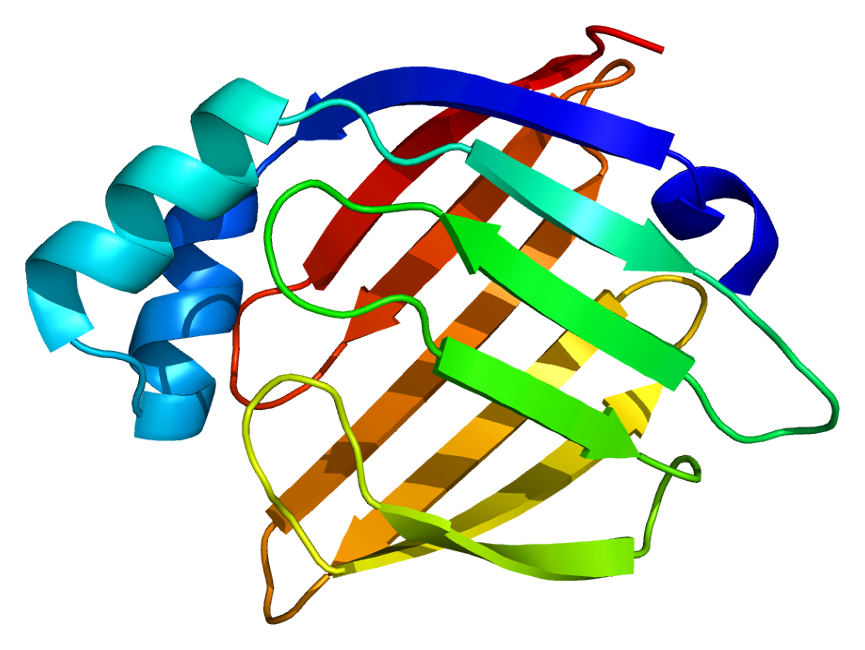

Identifiers
- Aliases: FABP3, FABP11, H-FABP, M-FABP, MDGI, O-FABP, Heart-type fatty acid binding protein, fatty acid binding protein 3
- External IDs: OMIM: 134651; MGI: 95476; GeneCards: FABP3
Available structures
PDB	Ortholog search: PDBe RCSB
PDB	List of PDB id codes 1G5W, 1HMR, 1HMS, 1HMT, 2HMB, 3RSW, 3WBG, 3WVM, 3WXQ, 4TJZ, 4TKB, 4TKH, 4TKJ, 4WBK, 5CE4

Gene location (Human)
Chr.	Chromosome 1 (human)
Band	1p35.2	Start	31,365,253 bp
Band	1p35.2	End	31,376,850 bp

Gene location (Mouse)
Chr.	Chromosome 4 (mouse)
Band	4 D2.2|4 63.43 cM	Start	130,202,388 bp
Band	4 D2.2|4 63.43 cM	End	130,209,256 bp
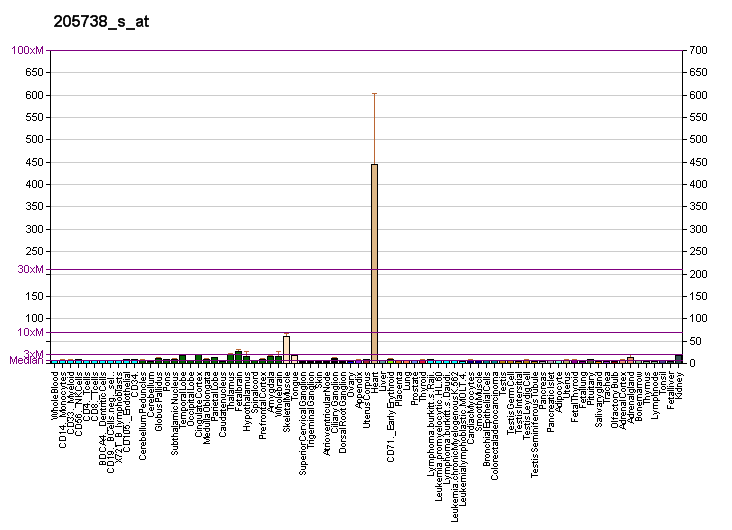

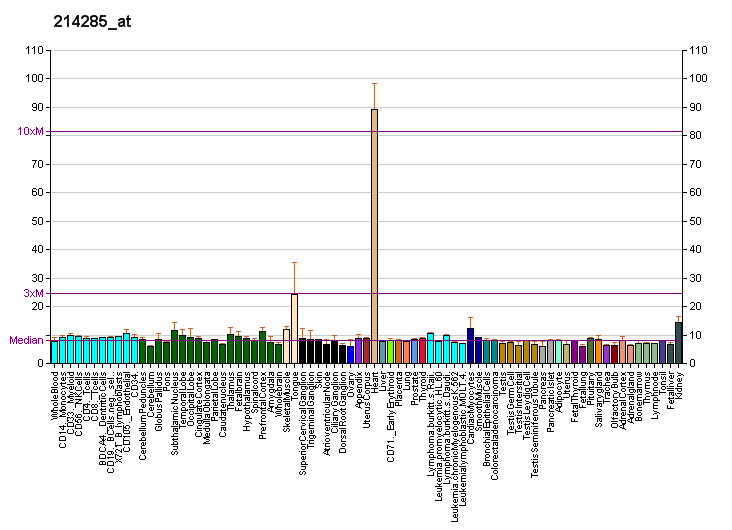
RNA expression pattern
Bgee	Human / Mouse (ortholog); Top expressed in: apex of heart; right auricle of heart; left ventricle; muscle of thigh; right ventricle; gastrocnemius muscle; myocardium of left ventricle; vena cava; cardiac muscle tissue of right atrium; right coronary artery / Top expressed in: heart; muscle of thigh; muscle tissue; skeletal muscle tissue; blastocyst; quadriceps femoris muscle; placenta; right kidney; morula; human kidney; More reference expression data
BioGPS	More reference expression data
Gene ontology
Molecular function	long-chain fatty acid transporter activity; transporter activity; long-chain fatty acid binding; oleic acid binding; cytoskeletal protein binding; fatty acid binding; protein binding; icosatetraenoic acid binding; lipid binding
Cellular component	cytoplasm; cytosol; sarcoplasm; extracellular exosome; extracellular space
Biological process	response to fatty acid; positive regulation of phospholipid biosynthetic process; fatty acid metabolic process; triglyceride catabolic process; response to insulin; negative regulation of cell population proliferation; long-chain fatty acid transport; cholesterol homeostasis; long-chain fatty acid import into cell; regulation of fatty acid oxidation; phospholipid homeostasis; regulation of phosphatidylcholine biosynthetic process; transport; intracellular lipid transport; positive regulation of long-chain fatty acid import into cell
Sources:Amigo / QuickGO
Orthologs
Databases	NCBI: entry; OMA: entry
Species	Human	Mouse
Entrez	2170	14077
Ensembl	ENSG00000121769	ENSMUSG00000028773
UniProt	P05413	P11404
RefSeq (mRNA)	NM_004102; NM_001320996	NM_010174
RefSeq (protein)	NP_001307925; NP_004093	NP_034304
Location (UCSC)	Chr 1: 31.37 – 31.38 Mb	Chr 4: 130.2 – 130.21 Mb
PubMed search
- Wikidata
View/Edit Human	View/Edit Mouse

Heart-type fatty acid binding protein (hFABP) also known as mammary-derived growth inhibitor is a protein that in humans is encoded by the FABP3 gene.

== Function ==
Heart-type Fatty Acid-Binding Protein (H-FABP) is a small cytoplasmic protein (15 kDa) released from cardiac myocytes following an ischemic episode. Like the nine other distinct FABPs that have been identified, H-FABP is involved in active fatty acid metabolism where it transports fatty acids from the cell membrane to mitochondria for oxidation. See FABP3 for biochemical details.

The intracellular fatty acid-binding proteins (FABPs) belongs to a multigene family. FABPs are divided into at least three distinct types, namely the hepatic-, intestinal- and cardiac-type. They form 14–15 kDa proteins and are thought to participate in the uptake, intracellular metabolism and/or transport of long-chain fatty acids. They may also be responsible in the modulation of cell growth and proliferation. Fatty acid-binding protein 3 gene contains four exons and its function is to arrest growth of mammary epithelial cells. This gene is also a candidate tumor suppressor gene for human breast cancer.

== Interactions ==
FABP3 is known to interact with TNNI3K in the context of interacting with cardiac troponin I. The protein also interacts with, VPS28, KIAA159, NUP62, PLK1, UBC, and Xpo1.

In HIV, a synthetic peptide corresponding to the immunosuppressive domain (amino acids 574–592) of HIV-1 gp41 downregulates the expression of fatty acid binding protein 3 (FABP3) in peptide-treated PBMCs.

== Clinical significance ==
=== Diagnostic potential ===
H-FABP is a sensitive biomarker for myocardial infarction and can be detected in the blood within one to three hours of the pain.

The diagnostic potential of the biomarker H-FABP for heart injury was discovered in 1988 by Professor Jan Glatz (Maastricht, Netherlands). H-FABP is 20 times more specific to cardiac muscle than myoglobin, it is found at 10-fold lower levels in skeletal muscle than heart muscle and the amounts in the kidney, liver and small intestine are even lower again.

H-FABP is recommended to be measured with troponin to identify myocardial infarction and acute coronary syndrome in patients presenting with chest pain. H-FABP measured with troponin shows increased sensitivity of 20.6% over troponin at 3–6 hours following chest pain onset. This sensitivity may be explained by the high concentration of H-FABP in myocardium compared to other tissues, the stability and solubility of H-FABP, its low molecular weight; 15 kDa compared to 18, 80 and 37 kDa for MYO, CK-MB and cTnT respectively, its rapid release into plasma after myocardial injury – 60 minutes after an ischemic episode, and its relative tissue specificity. Similarly this study showed that measuring H-FABP in combination with troponin increased the diagnostic accuracy and with a negative predictive value of 98% could be used to identify those not suffering from MI at the early time point of 3–6 hours post chest pain onset. The effectiveness of using the combination of H-FABP with troponin to diagnose MI within 6 hours is well reported.

=== Prognostic potential ===
In addition to its diagnostic potential, H-FABP also has prognostic value. Alongside D-dimer, NT-proBNP and peak troponin T, it was the only cardiac biomarker that proved to be a statistically significant predictor of death or MI at one year. This prognostic information was independent of troponin T, ECG and clinical examination. The risk associated with raised H-FABP is dependent upon its concentration. Patients who were TnI negative but H-FABP positive had 17% increased risk of all cause mortality within one year compared to those patients who were TnI positive but H-FABP negative. Currently these TnI positive patients are prioritised for angioplasty, and the TnI negative patients are considered to be of a lower priority, yet the addition of the H-FABP test helps identify patients who are currently slipping through the net and allows physicians to more appropriately manage this hidden high risk group. If both biomarkers were negative, there is 0% mortality at 6 months, in the authors own words this "represents a particularly worthwhile clinical outcome, especially because it was observed in patients admitted into hospital for suspected ACS." H-FABP indicates risk across the ACS spectrum including UA, NSTEMI or STEMI where low H-FABP concentrations confer low risk whereas high H-FABP concentrations indicate patients who are at a much higher risk of future events.

=== H-FABP in other diseases ===
H-FABP has been proven to significantly predict 30-day mortality in acute pulmonary embolism. H-FABP is more effective than Troponin T in risk stratifying Chronic Heart Failure patients. H-FABP is beginning to create interest with researchers who have found emerging evidence that indicates a role in differentiating between different neurodegenerative diseases.

=== H-FABP Point of care testing ===
To obtain diagnostic and prognostic information a precise and fully quantitative measurement of H-FABP is required. Commercial tests include a Cardiac Array on Evidence MultiStat; and an automated biochemistry assay

== See also ==
- Akash Manoj – Indian inventor who developed wearable device to detect h-FABP
