= Mohammed Suhail Chinya Salimpasha =

Indian Malnutrition Researcher and Entrepreneur

Mohammed Suhail CS
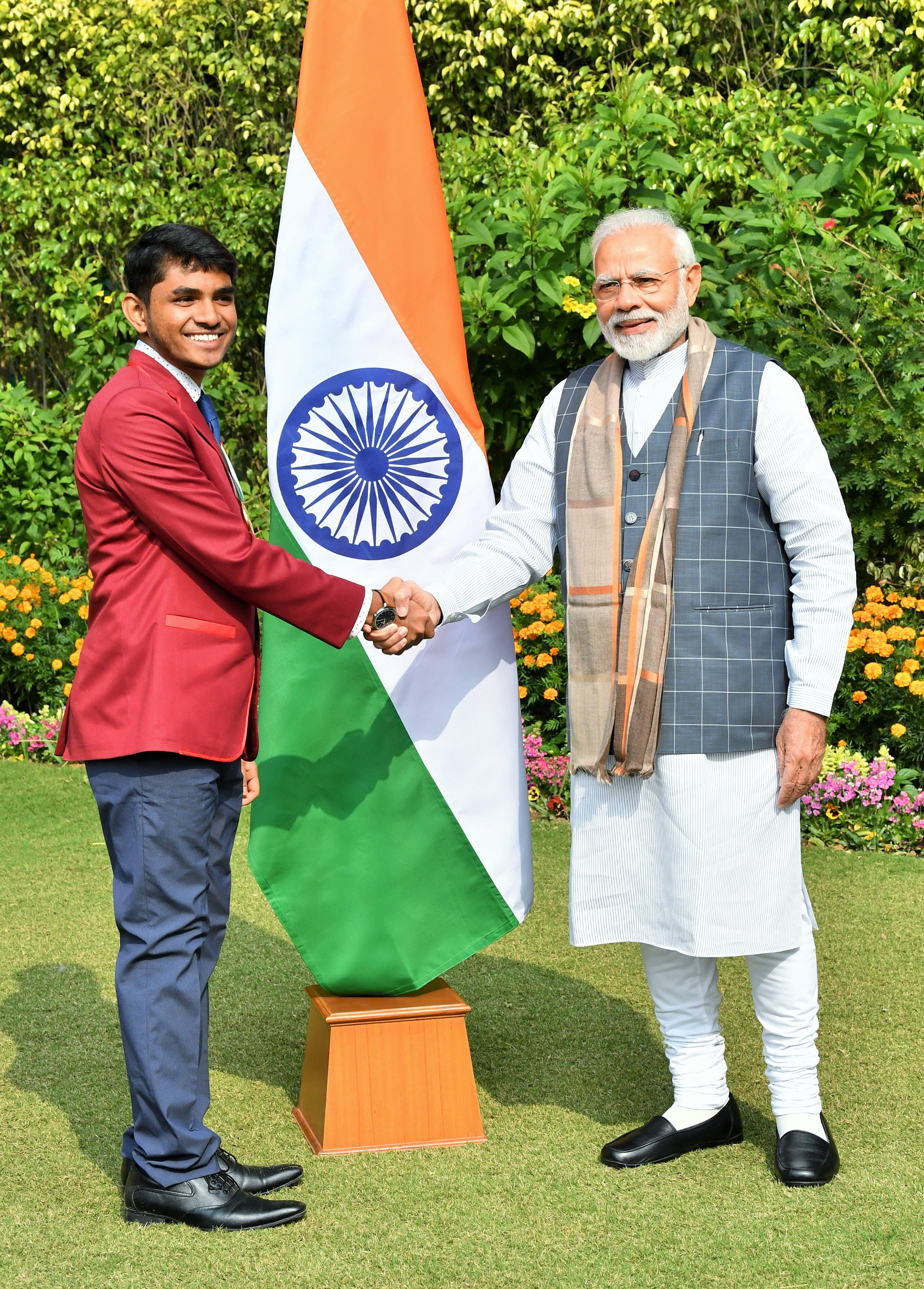
- Suhail with Prime Minister Narendra Modi
- Notable work: Early Diagnosis Of Malnutrition
- Awards: Pradhan Mantri Bal Puraskar 2019, Intel ISEF 2nd Grand Award. MIT Lincoln Laboratory Minor Planet Award - MOHAMMEDSUHAIL-34491
- Website: https://chinyasuhail.com

Mohammed Suhail Chinya Salimpasha (born Jan 20, 2001) is an Indian malnutrition researcher and inventor from Mangalore, Karnataka. He is known for his award-winning research on early diagnosis of protein–energy malnutrition.

Suhail developed a saliva-based colorimetric test for rapid quantification of nutrition status in children and establishing personalised nutrition plans.

He also developed a non-invasive saliva-based colorimetric using inexpensive tools such as paper for early diagnosis of malnutrition.

== Early life ==
Suhail is the son of Salim Pasha and Parveen. He was homeschooled and for a brief time schooled at St. Aloysius Pre-University College.

== Recognition ==
- Pradhan Mantri Bal Puraskar for his work in protein-energy malnutrition (2019)
- 2nd Grand Award at Intel International Science & Engineering Fair (2018).
- Minor planet, MOHAMMEDSUHAIL-34491, was named for him by MIT Lincoln Laboratory under the Ceres Connection Program.
