= Akash Manoj =

Indian cardiology researcher and inventor

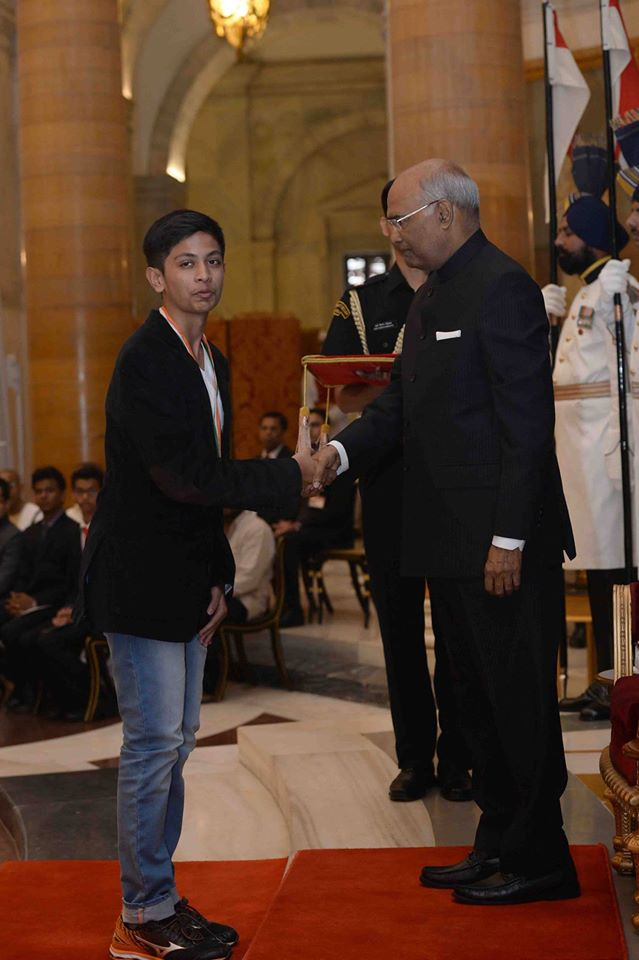
- Akash with the President of India
- Parents: Manoj Prabhakar; Somlatha Manoj
- Honours: National Child Award for Exceptional Achievement 2017 (gold medal)

Akash Manoj is an Indian cardiology researcher and inventor from Tamil Nadu. He is known for his award-winning research on "silent" heart attacks. He developed a novel technique that can non-invasively detect and alert at-risk patients of a potential asymptomatic heart-attack. His method involves transcutaneously isolating, identifying, spectroscopically analyzing, and sensing elevation in the levels of a cardiac biomarker called heart-type fatty acid binding protein (h-FABP) in realtime – a process that significantly establishes a path to preventative cardiovascular healthcare.

== Personal life ==
Akash graduated high school from The Ashok Leyland School in Hosur, Tamil Nadu. His recent interview with Forbes India suggests that he is currently studying at a medical school in Prague, Czech Republic.

== Accolades ==
Akash was awarded with "National Child Award for Exceptional Achievement" (Gold Medallion) [Now: Pradhan Mantri Rashtriya Bal Puraskar] by the President of India and an award at Intel ISEF 2018. Additionally, he has received several other notable national and international awards.
