= Kaamya Karthikeyan =

Indian mountaineer

Kaamya Karthikeyan is an Indian mountaineer who lives in Mumbai, Maharashtra. At 17 years of age, she became the youngest female in the world to complete the Seven Summits challenge in 2024. This record was broken by Emma Schwerin who summited Everest, her last of the seven summits, on May 15, 2025 at the age of 17 years, 2 months, and 24 days. At 16 years of age, she also became the youngest Indian mountaineer and second youngest girl in the world to summit Mount Everest from the Nepal side. In 2021, she was awarded the Pradhan Mantri Rashtriya Bal Puraskar, the highest civilian award for Indian citizens under the age of 18.

== Early life ==
Kaamya's father S. Karthikeyan is a Commander in the Indian Navy and her mother Lavanya Karthikeyan is an early childhood educator. She is currently a student at Mumbai's Navy Children School.

== Mountaineering ==
Kaamya has summited the highest peak on all continents and became the youngest female to complete the seven summits challenge when she summited Mt. Vinson in Antarctica at 1720 hrs on 24 Dec 2024 (UTC -03:00). Kaamya had earlier summited Mount Everest on 20 May 2024, becoming the youngest Indian and the second youngest female in the world to climb the peak from Nepal side. She summited Denali in 2022 , Mt. Aconcagua in 2020 (becoming the youngest girl in the world to climb the peak) and Mount Elbrus in 2018 (becoming the youngest to complete a ski-descent from the peak). She scaled Kilimanjaro in 2017 and Mount Kosciuszko in 2018.
