= Waka Sato =

Japanese weightlifter (born 2007)

Personal information
- Nationality: Japanese
- Born: 22 April 2007 (age 19) Sendai, Miyagi Prefecture, Japan

Sport
- Sport: Weightlifting
- Weight class: 55kg
Medal record
Women's weightlifting
Representing Japan
Youth World Championships
| Silver medal – second place | 2024 Lima | 55kg |

Waka Sato (佐藤 和花, Satō Waka) (born 22 April 2007) is a Japanese weightlifter, competing in the 55 kg category.

In May 2024, she competed at the 2024 Youth World Weightlifting Championships in the 55kg event to win a silver medal.

== Major results ==
| Year | Venue | Weight | Snatch (kg) | Clean & Jerk (kg) | Total | Rank |
Youth World Weightlifting Championships
| 2024 | Lima, Peru | 55kg | 79 | 100 | 179 | (silver) |
