= Shivangi Pathak =

Indian mountaineer (born 2002)

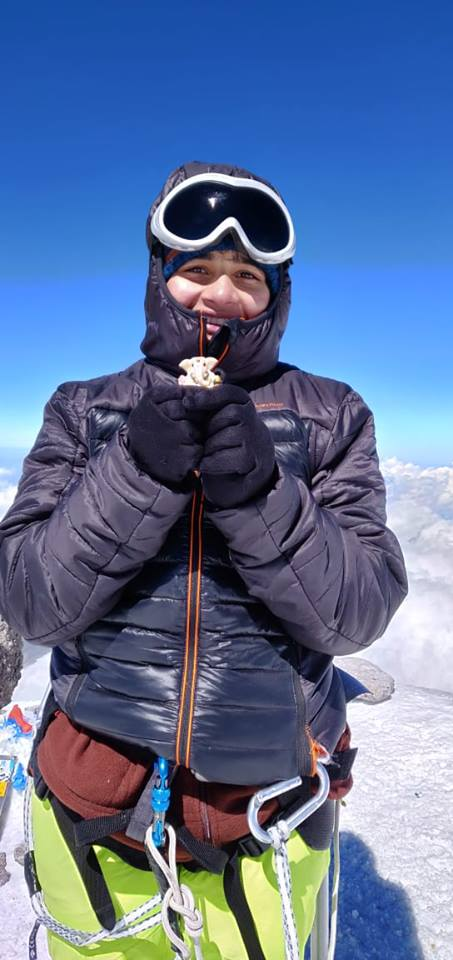

Personal information
- Born: August 2002 (age 23–24) Hisar, Haryana, India
- Occupation: Mountaineer

Shivangi Pathak is an Indian mountaineer born in Hisar, Haryana in August 2002. She climbed Russia's highest peak Mount Elbrus in Europe on 2 September 2018. She also climbed the highest peak of Africa, Kilimanjaro, on 24 July 2018 at the age of 17.

== Early life ==
Pathak was born in Hisar of Haryana in north-western India.

== Everest climb ==
Training for climbing Mt. Everest, included climbing Stok Khangri, a 6,053-metre peak in Ladakh.

Her ascent of the peak began in April 2018 from the Nepal base camp of Everest, the entire Everest expedition took one month.

== Awards ==
She was honored with the Bal Shakti Puraskar 2019.
