= Prasiddhi Singh =

Indian social entrepreneur and environmental activist

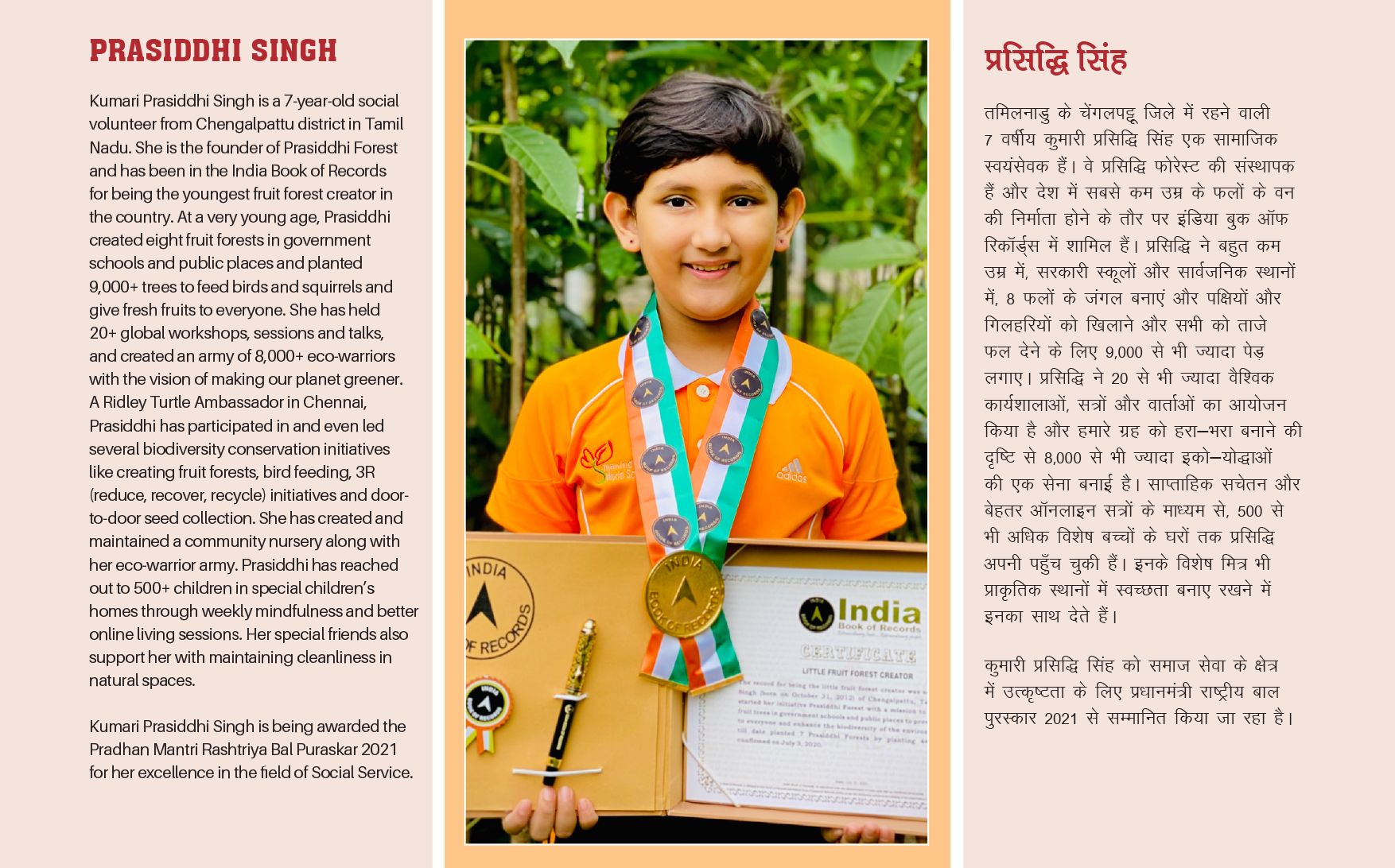
- Prasiddhi Singh’s portrait commemorating her award
- Born: 31 October 2012 (age 13); Chengalpattu, Tamil Nadu, India
- Known for: Environmental activism
- Honours: Pradhan Mantri Rashtriya Bal Puraskar, 2021

Prasiddhi Singh (born 31 October 2012) is a social entrepreneur and environmental activist, hailing from the Chengalpattu district of Tamil Nadu. She is well noted for having led the plantation programme of thousands of trees and fourteen forests all across India, with a specific focus in the degraded Tamil region, through the ‘Prasiddhi Forest Foundation’ she has established. In Puducherry, Prasiddhi had regularly been carrying out environmental activities.

== Personal life ==
Prasiddhi was born in 2012 and is currently undergoing her primary studies at the Mahindra World School in Chennai. She started with environmental activism in 2016 after Cyclone Vardah uprooted trees in her neighbourhood and destroyed villages and farmlands.

== Awards and recognition ==
For her contributions in the field of social welfare, Singh was presented with the Pradhan Mantri Rashtriya Bal Puraskar in 2021.
