= Sambhab Mishra =

Indian author and researcher

- Born: 1 October 2006 (age 19); Cuttack, Odisha
- Awards: Pradhan Mantri Rashtriya Bal Puraskar 2023

Sambhab Mishra (ସମ୍ଭବ ମିଶ୍ର) (born 1 October 2006) is a young author and researcher from Cuttack, Odisha. He is a recipient of the Pradhan Mantri Rashtriya Bal Puraskar. He is also a Fellow of the Royal Asiatic Society of Great Britain and Ireland. He briefly served as a research intern at the Cleveland Clinic & Case Western Reserve University.

== Honours and awards ==
- Pradhan Mantri Bal Puraskar for his notable work in Art and Culture (2023).
- Deen Dayal SPARSH Yojana Scholarship by the Department of Posts, Ministry of Communications.

== Publications ==
- 2026 - Mishra, Sambhab (2026). "Refinements of Jensen's Inequality for Twice-Differentiable Convex Functions with Bounded Hessian". arXiv:2601.05030 [cs.IT].
- 2021 - Vijayee Bhaba Bharat : Part 1. Self Published. 2021. ISBN 9781639579280.
- 2022 - History Bows Down Its Head : Unsung Freedom Fighters. Self Published. 2022. ISBN 9798885910781.
- 2022 - The Mahabharata (Part-I) : The Pandava Katha Series. Self Published. 2022. ISBN 9798886065671.
