= Pradhan Mantri Rashtriya Bal Puraskar =

Civilian award given by the Government of India

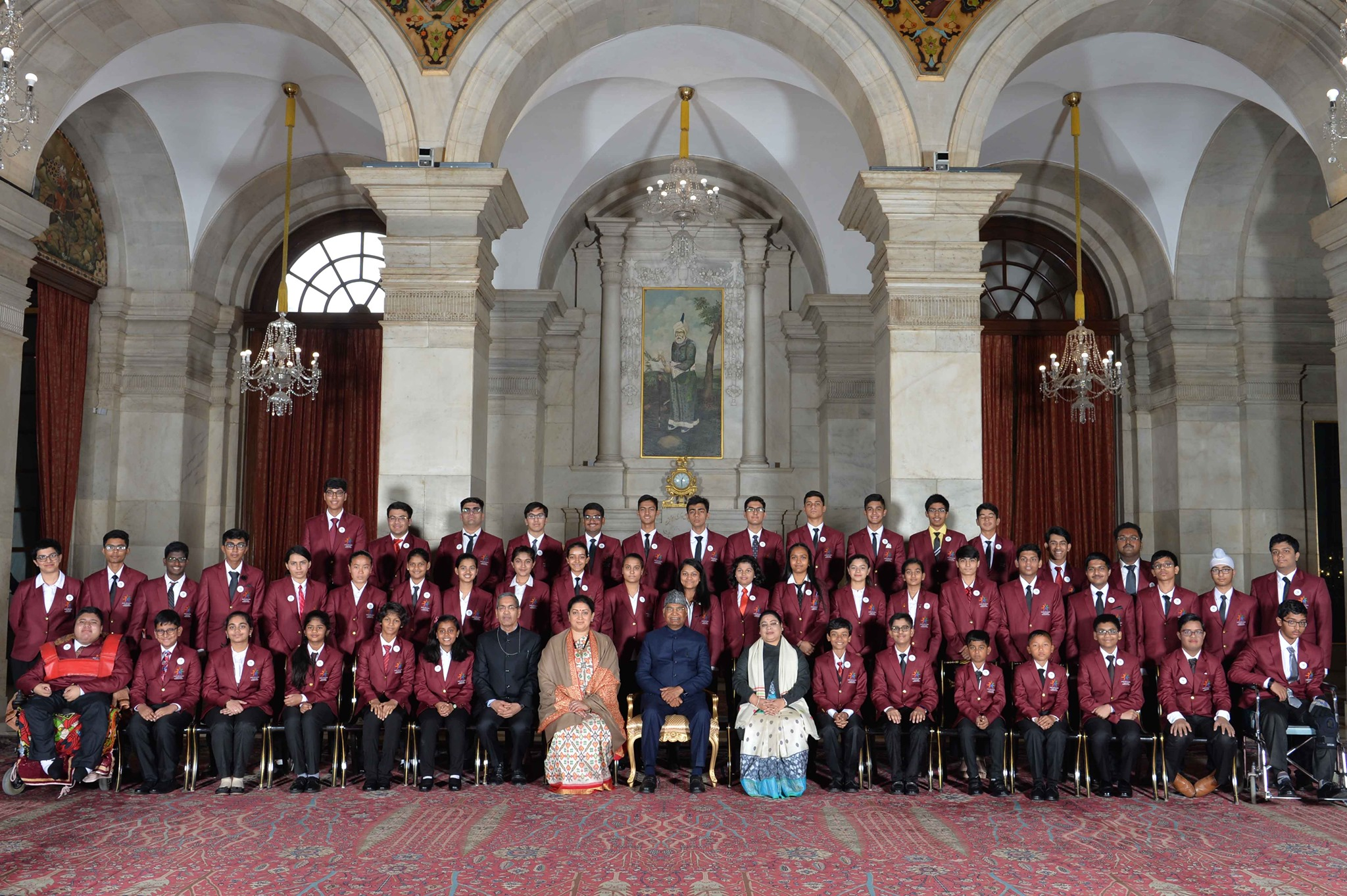
- President Ram Nath Kovind Conferring The Pradhan Mantri Rashtriya Bal Puraskar, 2020.
- Type: Civilian award
- Awarded for: Achievements in the fields of "innovation, scholastic achievements, social service, arts & culture, bravery, and sports" (Bal Shakti Puraskar), and in the fields of "child development, child protection, and child welfare" (Bal Kalyan Puraskar)
- Venue: Rashtrapati Bhavan
- Country: India
- Presented by: Government of India
- Rewards: A medal, a cash prize, and a certificate
- First award: 1996
- Final award: 2025

Highlights
- Total: 11 to 30 per year
- Website: nca-wcd.nic.in

The Pradhan Mantri Rashtriya Bal Puraskar (lit. 'Prime Minister's National Award for Children'), is India’s highest civilian honour for children, awarded annually by the Ministry of Women and Child Development.

The award has two categories: Bal Shakti Puraskar, awarded to Indian citizens under the age of 18 for outstanding achievement in innovation, scholastic achievements, social service, arts and culture, bravery, or sports, and Bal Kalyan Puraskar, to individuals or organisations that have made outstanding contributions in child development, child protection, or child welfare.

The Bal Kalyan Puraskar, previously the National Child Welfare Awards, was instituted by the Ministry of Women and Child Development in 1979, and the Bal Shakti Puraskar, previously the National Child Award, was instituted by the NGO Indian Council for Child Welfare in 1996. In 2018, the two awards were renamed and combined into the Pradhan Mantri Rashtriya Bal Puraskar, which is administered by the Ministry of Women and Child Development.

It is conferred by the President of India in the week preceding Republic Day, 26 January, in the Durbar Hall of Rashtrapati Bhavan in New Delhi. Previously, the awards were conferred on Children's Day. The Prime Minister of India also meets with the awardees at his residence, 7, Race Course Road and the awardees take part in the Republic Day parade. In 2021 and 2022, owing to the COVID-19 pandemic, the award ceremony was shifted online, and besides the Prime Minister meeting the awardees in a video conference, it was the first ever instance of blockchain certificates (built in association with IIT-Kanpur) being presented to awardees for both the years. In 2023, a total of 11 awardees were conferred the award by the President of India at the Vigyan Bhawan, New Delhi. The 2025 award was conferred by the President of India on the occasion of the Veer Bal Divas in 2024 to a total of seventeen awardees.

== Award ==
The award includes a medal, a cash prize, a citation and a certificate. Children who win the Bal Shakti Puraskar also receive book vouchers, and participate in the Republic Day Parade. Besides, eligible children are also presented with a specified reservation of central pool seats for medical education, allocated annually by the Ministry of Health and Family Welfare.

== Eligibility and nominations ==
=== Bal Kalyan Puraskar ===
Bal Kalyan Puraskar has two categories, for individuals and for institutions. Three awards are given in each category.

In the individual category, Indian citizens who are 18 years old or above on 31 August in the year they are nominated, and who are not employed by an institution, are eligible to be nominated. Institutions working within "any field of child welfare" can be nominated for the institutions category. In the case of both individuals and institutions, the nominee must have been active for a number of years in the field they are nominated within.

=== Bal Shakti Puraskar ===
Children who are Indian citizens and who are between the ages of 5 and 18 on 31 August in the year they are nominated are eligible for the Bal Shakti Puraskar. Any Indian citizen may nominate a child for the award. The deadline for nominations is 31 August each year, for the awards that are given in January of the following year.

== Selection committee ==
The awardees are selected by a committee including representatives of the Ministry of Women and Child Development and a number of other departments, as well as subject experts in the relevant fields.

== Notable recipients ==
=== National Child Award / Bal Shakti Puraskar ===
- Palak Muchhal (2000)
- S. J. Jananiy (2001)
- Kishan SS (2009)
- Aravindh Chithambaram (2015)
- R Vaishali (2015)
- Vantika Agrawal (2016)
- Nihal Sarin (2016)
- Akash Manoj (2017)
- Zaira Wasim (2017)
- Dev Joshi (2019)
- Esow Alben (2019)
- Mohammed Suhail Chinya Salimpasha (2019)
- Shivangi Pathak (2019)
- R Praggnanandhaa (2019)
- Esha Singh (2020)
- Prithu Gupta
- Jyoti Kumari (2021)
- Souhardya De (2021)
- Prasiddhi Singh (2021)
- Kaamya Karthikeyan (2021)
- Sambhab Mishra (2023)
- Linthoi Chanambam (2024)
- Anish Sarkar (2025)
- Vaibhav Sooryavanshi (2025)
- Dhinidhi Desinghu (2025)
- Jyoshna Sabar (2025)

=== Bal Kalyan Puraskar ===
- Anand Kumar (2017)
