= Samuel Andrade =

Brazilian footballer

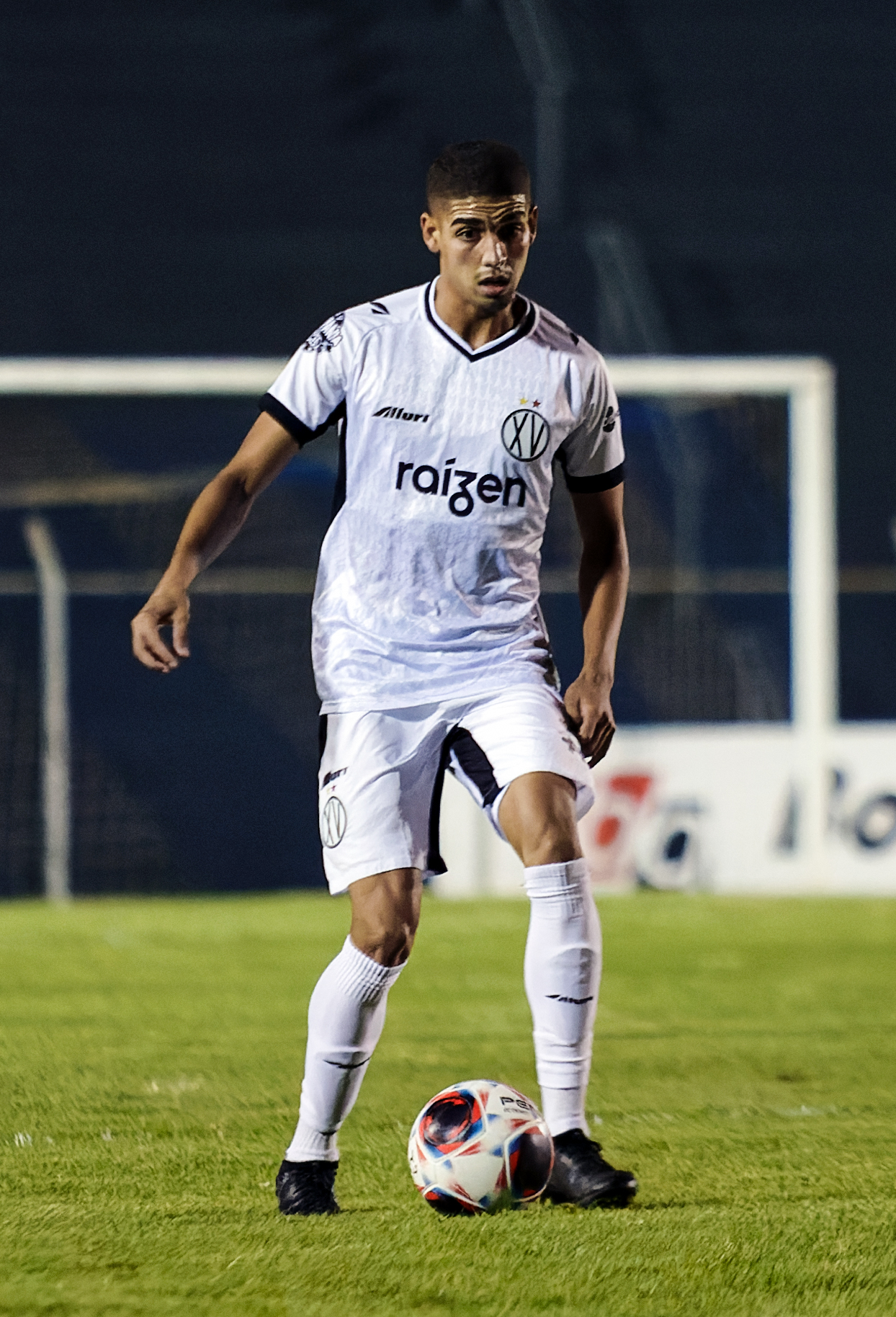
- Andrade playing for XV de Piracicaba in 2023

Personal information
- Full name: Samuel Naum Andrade Leão
- Date of birth: 12 August 2000 (age 26)
- Place of birth: Americana, Brazil
- Height: 1.78 m (5 ft 10 in)
- Position: Midfielder

Team information
- Current team: Primavera

Youth career
- 2016–2017: Rio Branco-SP
- 2018–2019: XV de Piracicaba

Senior career*
Years	Team	Apps	(Gls)
2019–2024	XV de Piracicaba	47	(1)
2021	→ Cianorte (loan)	9	(0)
2022	→ Pouso Alegre (loan)	4	(0)
2022	→ Votuporanguense (loan)	13	(0)
2023	→ Ponte Preta (loan)	17	(0)
2024	→ Londrina (loan)	6	(0)
2025–	Primavera	6	(0)
2025	→ Seongnam FC (loan)	30	(0)
- * Club domestic league appearances and goals as of 18:51, 10 February 2026 (UTC)

Samuel Naum Andrade Leão (born 12 August 2000), known as Samuel Andrade, is a Brazilian footballer who plays as a midfielder for Primavera.

== Career ==
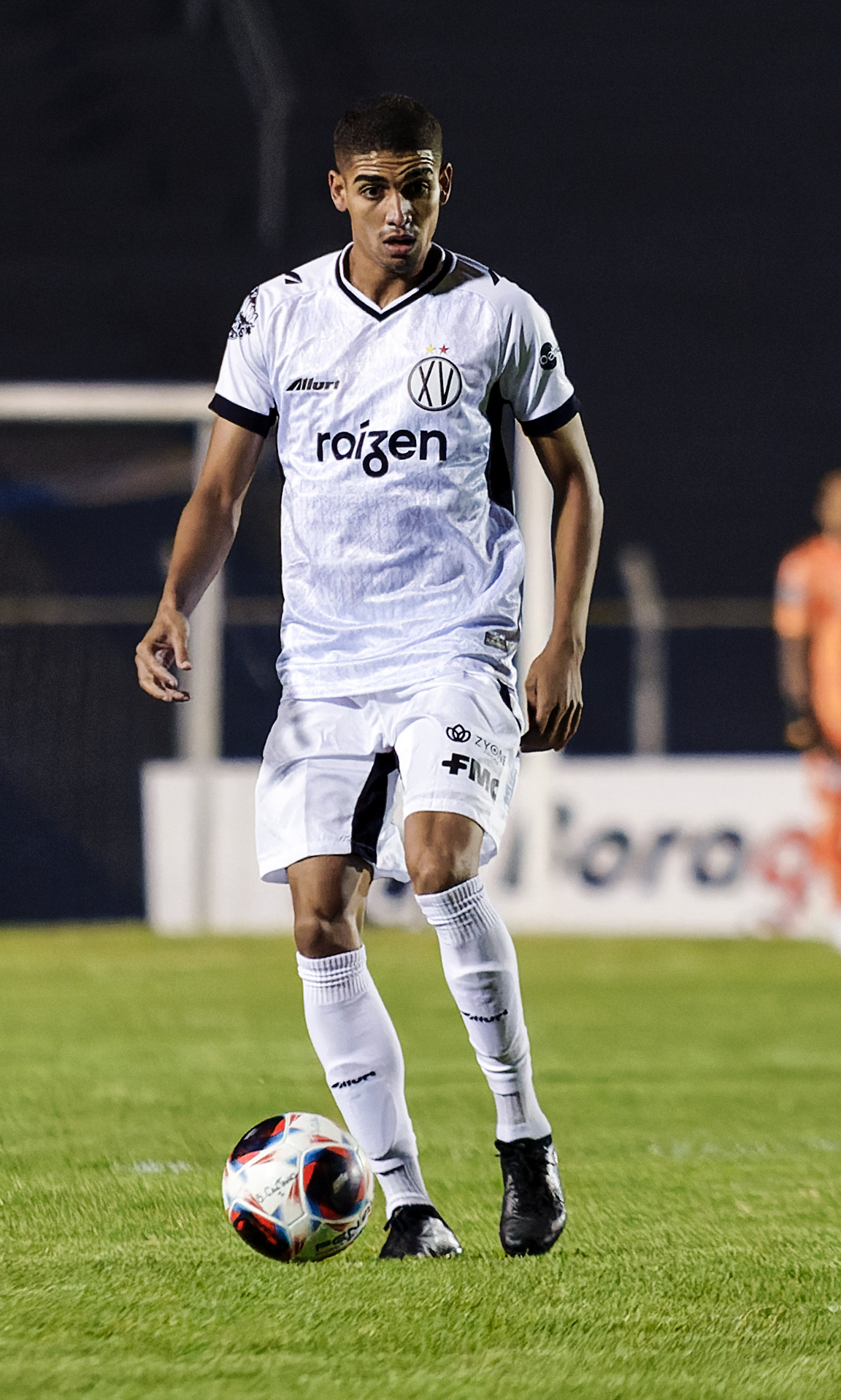
Andrade in action for XV de Piracicaba in 2023

Born in Americana, São Paulo, Andrade was a youth product of XV de Piracicaba. After making his first team debut in 2019, he subsequently became a regular starter before being loaned out to Cianorte on 27 May 2021.

During the 2022, Andrade served loan stints at Pouso Alegre and Votuporanguense before returning to XV. After being an undisputed starter at the latter, he was loaned to Série B side Ponte Preta in April 2023.

On 16 April 2024, Andrade was announced at Londrina, still owned by XV. He began the 2025 season at Primavera, before moving to K League 2 side Seongnam FC on 3 February 2025, on loan.

On 7 January 2026, Andrade was announced back at Primavera for the club's first-ever Campeonato Paulista campaign.

== Career statistics ==
As of 10 February 2026.

Club	Season	League			State League		Cup		Continental		Other		Total	
Club	Season	Division	Apps	Goals	Apps	Goals	Apps	Goals	Apps	Goals	Apps	Goals	Apps	Goals
XV de Piracicaba	2019	Paulista A2	—		—		—		—		4 (Note: Appearance(s) in Copa Paulista)	0	4	0
XV de Piracicaba	2020	Paulista A2	—		8	0	1	1	—		8	0	17	1
XV de Piracicaba	2021	Paulista A2	—		7	0	—		—		—		7	0
XV de Piracicaba	2022	Paulista A2	—		—		—		—		13	1	13	1
XV de Piracicaba	2023	Paulista A2	—		17	1	—		—		—		17	1
XV de Piracicaba	2024	Paulista A2	—		15	0	—		—		—		15	0
XV de Piracicaba	Total		—		47	1	1	1	—		25	1	73	3
Cianorte (loan)	2021	Série D	9	0	—		0	0	—		—		9	0
Pouso Alegre (loan)	2022	Série D	—		4	0	—		—		—		4	0
Votuporanguense (loan)	2022	Paulista A3	—		13	0	—		—		—		13	0
Ponte Preta (loan)	2023	Série B	17	0	—		—		—		—		17	0
Londrina (loan)	2024	Série C	6	0	—		—		—		—		6	0
Primavera	2025	Paulista A2	—		3	0	—		—		—		3	0
Primavera	2026	Paulista	—		3	0	—		—		—		3	0
Primavera	Total		—		6	0	—		—		—		6	0
Seongnam FC (loan)	2025	K League 2	30	0	—		—		—		1 (Note: Appearance(s) in K League 2 promotion play-offs)	0	31	0
Career total			62	0	70	1	1	1	0	0	26	1	159	3
