= Sairaj Pardeshi =

Indian weightlifter

Personal information
- Nationality: Indian
- Born: 2007 (age 18–19) Manmad, Maharashtra, India

Sport
- Sport: Weightlifting
- Event: 88 kg
- Team: India

Sairaj Pardeshi (born 2007) is an Indian weightlifter who competes in the men's 88 kg category. He is best known for winning the gold medal at the 2025 Commonwealth Weightlifting Championships in the junior division.

== Career ==
At the 2025 Commonwealth Weightlifting Championships held in Ahmedabad, Pardeshi won gold in the junior men's 88 kg category. He lifted a total of 348 kg, comprising a snatch of 157 kg and a clean & jerk of 191 kg, setting new junior Commonwealth records. His total was also higher than the senior gold-winning tally.

In 2024 he won the gold medal at the 2024 Asian Youth & Junior Weightlifting Championships in Doha, lifting a total of 310 kg (snatch and clean & jerk combined).
