= Sarwagya Singh Kushwaha =

Indian chess player (born 2022)

Personal information
- Born: 2022 (age 3–4) Sagar, Madhya Pradesh, India

Chess career
- Country: India
- Years active: 2025 — present
- FIDE rating: 1642 (June 2026)
- Peak rating: 1642 (June 2026)

Sarwagya Singh Kushwaha is an Indian chess prodigy who achieved a FIDE rating of 1572 at the age of three becoming the youngest player to earn an official FIDE rating.

== Career ==
Sarwagya started playing chess when he was two and a half years old. He played for four to five hours daily and also attended extra chess coaching. He defeated three FIDE rated player before achieving official rating. Before Kushwaha, this record was held by Anish Sarkar who set the record on 3 years 8 month and 19 days in November 2024.

In December 2025, a police complaint was filed against him citing that he achieved this rating by "unfair means" and that he "violated FIDE Policy".
