= TNNI3K =

Protein-coding gene in humans

Identifiers
- Aliases: TNNI3K, CARK, CCDD, TNNI3 interacting kinase
- External IDs: OMIM: 613932; MGI: 2443276; GeneCards: TNNI3K
Available structures
PDB	Ortholog search: PDBe RCSB
PDB	List of PDB id codes 4YFI, 4YFF
Enzyme activity
EC #	BRENDA	ExPASy	KEGG	MetaCyc
2.7.11.1	↗	↗	↗	↗

Gene location (Human)
Chr.	Chromosome 1 (human)
Band	1p31.1	Start	74,235,387 bp
Band	1p31.1	End	74,544,428 bp

Gene location (Mouse)
Chr.	Chromosome 3 (mouse)
Band	3|3 H4	Start	154,491,928 bp
Band	3|3 H4	End	154,761,044 bp
RNA expression pattern
Bgee	Human / Mouse (ortholog); Top expressed in: apex of heart; left ventricle; right auricle of heart; gonad; cerebellar hemisphere; right hemisphere of cerebellum; testicle; primary visual cortex; Brodmann area 9; right frontal lobe / Top expressed in: myocardium of ventricle; atrium; lumbar spinal ganglion; atrioventricular valve; endocardial cushion; left ventricle; olfactory epithelium; semi-lunar valve; aortic valve; esophagus; More reference expression data
BioGPS	n/a
Gene ontology
Molecular function	transferase activity; protein kinase activity; protein serine/threonine kinase activity; nucleotide binding; protein C-terminus binding; protein binding; troponin I binding; ATP binding; metal ion binding; kinase activity; signal transducer activity
Cellular component	cytoplasm; nucleus
Biological process	protein phosphorylation; regulation of cardiac muscle contraction; regulation of cardiac conduction; bundle of His cell to Purkinje myocyte communication; phosphorylation; regulation of heart rate; intracellular signal transduction
Sources:Amigo / QuickGO
Orthologs
Databases	NCBI: entry; OMA: entry
Species	Human	Mouse
Entrez	51086	435766
Ensembl	ENSG00000116783	ENSMUSG00000040086
UniProt	Q59H18	Q5GIG6
RefSeq (mRNA)	NM_015978	NM_001012364; NM_177066
RefSeq (protein)	NP_001106279; NP_001186256; NP_057062	NP_796040
Location (UCSC)	Chr 1: 74.24 – 74.54 Mb	Chr 3: 154.49 – 154.76 Mb
PubMed search
- Wikidata
View/Edit Human	View/Edit Mouse

TNNI3 interacting kinase is a protein that in humans is encoded by the TNNI3K gene.

== Function ==
This gene encodes a protein that belongs to the MAP kinase kinase kinase (MAPKKK) family of protein kinases. The protein contains ankyrin repeat, protein kinase and serine-rich domains and is thought to play a role in cardiac physiology.

== Clinical significance ==
Mutations in TNNI3K are associated to cardiomyopathies.
