= 2019 European Junior & U23 Weightlifting Championships =

International weightlifting competition

2019 European Junior & U23 Weightlifting Championship
- Venue: Rin Grand Hotel
- Location: Bucharest, Romania
- Dates: 18–27 October

The 2019 European Junior & U23 Weightlifting Championships took place in Rin Grand Hotel, Bucharest, Romania from 18 to 27 October 2019.

== Team ranking ==
Rank	Men's Junior		Women's Junior		Men's Under-23		Women's Under-23	
Rank	Team	Points	Team	Points	Team	Points	Team	Points
1	Turkey	613	Turkey	697	Ukraine	549	Russia	670
2	Georgia	565	Russia	685	Georgia	453	Poland	391
3	Armenia	545	Romania	671	Armenia	445	Ukraine	379
4	Russia	542	Ukraine	596	Russia	433	Turkey	297
5	Belarus	537	Poland	466	Germany	336	Moldova	285
6	Ukraine	511	France	308	Italy	299	Romania	267

== Medal summary ==
=== Juniors ===
==== Men ====
Event	Gold		Silver		Bronze	
55 kg
Snatch	Monte Mkhitaryan (ARM)	111 kg	Cristian Luca (ROU)	110 kg	Angel Rusev (BUL)	107 kg
Clean & Jerk	Angel Rusev (BUL)	136 kg	Valentin Iancu (ROU)	134 kg	Sergio Massidda (ITA)	133 kg
Total	Angel Rusev (BUL)	243 kg	Cristian Luca (ROU)	242 kg	Valentin Iancu (ROU)	240 kg
61 kg
Snatch	Ramazan Kara (TUR)	119 kg	Davide Ruiu (ITA)	118 kg	Dogan Dönen (TUR)	117 kg
Clean & Jerk	Davide Ruiu (ITA)	152 kg	Dogan Dönen (TUR)	145 kg	Ramazan Kara (TUR)	144 kg
Total	Davide Ruiu (ITA)	270 kg	Ramazan Kara (TUR)	263 kg	Dogan Dönen (TUR)	262 kg
67 kg
Snatch	Zulfat Garaev (RUS)	144 kg EJR	Stilyan Grozdev (BUL)	135 kg	Valentin Genchev (BUL)	134 kg
Clean & Jerk	Zulfat Garaev (RUS)	170 kg	Stilyan Grozdev (BUL)	167 kg	Valentin Genchev (BUL)	165 kg
Total	Zulfat Garaev (RUS)	314 kg EJR	Stilyan Grozdev (BUL)	302 kg	Valentin Genchev (BUL)	299 kg
73 kg
Snatch	Muhammed Furkan Özbek (TUR)	148 kg	Marin Robu (MDA)	144 kg	Archil Malakmadze (GEO)	144 kg
Clean & Jerk	Muhammed Furkan Özbek (TUR)	181 kg EJR	Batuhan Yüksel (TUR)	177 kg	Piotr Kudłaszyk (POL)	172 kg
Total	Muhammed Furkan Özbek (TUR)	329 kg EJR	Marin Robu (MDA)	315 kg	Batuhan Yüksel (TUR)	312 kg
81 kg
Snatch	Ritvars Suharevs (LAT)	158 kg	Ihar Lozka (BLR)	152 kg	Karen Margaryan (ARM)	151 kg
Clean & Jerk	Ihar Lozka (BLR)	191 kg	Rafik Harutyunyan (ARM)	190 kg	Ritvars Suharevs (LAT)	190 kg
Total	Ritvars Suharevs (LAT)	348 kg	Ihar Lozka (BLR)	343 kg	Rafik Harutyunyan (ARM)	340 kg
89 kg
Snatch	Karen Avagyan (ARM)	170 kg WJR	Ara Aghanyan (ARM)	162 kg	Siarhei Sharankou (BLR)	161 kg WYR
Clean & Jerk	Ara Aghanyan (ARM)	196 kg	Karen Avagyan (ARM)	194 kg	Armands Mežinskis (LAT)	192 kg
Total	Karen Avagyan (ARM)	364 kg	Ara Aghanyan (ARM)	358 kg	Siarhei Sharankou (BLR)	346 kg WYR
96 kg
Snatch	Andrii Bozhuk (UKR)	163 kg	Paweł Szmeja (POL)	162 kg	Artur Babayan (RUS)	160 kg
Clean & Jerk	Tudor Ciobanu (MDA)	198 kg	Artem Pushmin (RUS)	194 kg	Artur Babayan (RUS)	194 kg EYR
Total	Tudor Ciobanu (MDA)	355 kg	Artur Babayan (RUS)	354 kg WYR	Andrii Bozhuk (UKR)	353 kg
102 kg
Snatch	Andrei Arlionak (BLR)	171 kg	Bohdan Hoza (UKR)	170 kg WYR	Vasil Marinov (BUL)	161 kg
Clean & Jerk	Andrei Arlionak (BLR)	199 kg	Khas-Magomed Balaev (RUS)	198 kg	Egor Pushmin (RUS)	196 kg
Total	Andrei Arlionak (BLR)	370 kg	Bohdan Hoza (UKR)	365 kg WYR	Egor Pushmin (RUS)	356 kg
109 kg
Snatch	Hristo Hristov (BUL)	180 kg	Kanstantsin Kurouski (BLR)	176 kg	Daniil Vagaitsev (RUS)	175 kg
Clean & Jerk	Hristo Hristov (BUL)	216 kg EJR	Daniil Vagaitsev (RUS)	206 kg	Yasha Minasyan (ARM)	206 kg
Total	Hristo Hristov (BUL)	396 kg EJR	Daniil Vagaitsev (RUS)	381 kg	Kanstantsin Kurouski (BLR)	371 kg
+109 kg
Snatch	Varazdat Lalayan (ARM)	194 kg EJR	Oleh Hanzenko (UKR)	178 kg	Enzo Kuworge (NED)	171 kg
Clean & Jerk	Varazdat Lalayan (ARM)	230 kg EJR	Enzo Kuworge (NED)	220 kg	Oleh Hanzenko (UKR)	212 kg
Total	Varazdat Lalayan (ARM)	424 kg EJR	Enzo Kuworge (NED)	391 kg	Oleh Hanzenko (UKR)	390 kg

==== Women ====
Event	Gold		Silver		Bronze	
45 kg
Snatch	Ayşe Doğan (TUR)	69 kg	Bianca Dumitrescu (ROU)	68 kg	Adriana Pană (ROU)	66 kg
Clean & Jerk	Bianca Dumitrescu (ROU)	84 kg	Anastasiia Korchagina (RUS)	83 kg	Adriana Pană (ROU)	83 kg
Total	Bianca Dumitrescu (ROU)	152 kg	Adriana Pană (ROU)	149 kg	Anastasiia Korchagina (RUS)	147 kg
49 kg
Snatch	Nina Sterckx (BEL)	83 kg WYR, EJR	Mihaela Cambei (ROU)	77 kg	Giulia Imperio (ITA)	76 kg
Clean & Jerk	Nina Sterckx (BEL)	93 kg EYR	Mihaela Cambei (ROU)	93 kg	Pelinsu Bayav (TUR)	92 kg
Total	Nina Sterckx (BEL)	176 kg EYR	Mihaela Cambei (ROU)	170 kg	Pelinsu Bayav (TUR)	167 kg
55 kg
Snatch	Kamila Konotop (UKR)	91 kg	Lucrezia Magistris (ITA)	87 kg	Kristina Novitskaia (RUS)	85 kg
Clean & Jerk	Kristina Novitskaia (RUS)	107 kg	Kamila Konotop (UKR)	107 kg	Sabina Azimova (AZE)	105 kg
Total	Kamila Konotop (UKR)	198 kg EJR	Kristina Novitskaia (RUS)	192 kg	Lucrezia Magistris (ITA)	191 kg
59 kg
Snatch	Andreea Penciu (ROU)	88 kg	Ayşegül Çakın (TUR)	87 kg	Mariia Tymoshchuk (UKR)	86 kg
Clean & Jerk	Ayşegül Çakın (TUR)	116 kg	Hatice Açıkgöz (TUR)	104 kg	Mariia Tymoshchuk (UKR)	104 kg
Total	Ayşegül Çakın (TUR)	203 kg	Mariia Tymoshchuk (UKR)	190 kg	Andreea Penciu (ROU)	188 kg
64 kg
Snatch	Giulia Miserendino (ITA)	95 kg EYR	Nuray Levent (TUR)	95 kg	Berfin Altun (TUR)	94 kg
Clean & Jerk	Berfin Altun (TUR)	118 kg	Maria Grigoriu (ROU)	116 kg	Nuray Levent (TUR)	115 kg
Total	Berfin Altun (TUR)	212 kg	Nuray Levent (TUR)	210 kg	Maria Grigoriu (ROU)	205 kg
71 kg
Snatch	Alessia Durante (ITA)	93 kg	Maria Kireva (BUL)	92 kg	Mariana Tăbăcaru (ROU)	91 kg
Clean & Jerk	Aino Luostarinen (FIN)	115 kg	Alina Kirychuk (UKR)	113 kg	Alessia Durante (ITA)	113 kg
Total	Alessia Durante (ITA)	206 kg	Aino Luostarinen (FIN)	203 kg	Alina Kirychuk (UKR)	201 kg
76 kg
Snatch	Dilara Narin (TUR)	94 kg	Nikola Seničová (SVK)	94 kg	Veronika Mitykó (HUN)	93 kg
Clean & Jerk	Dilara Narin (TUR)	130 kg WYR	Ekaterina Vizgina (RUS)	113 kg	Nikola Seničová (SVK)	112 kg
Total	Dilara Narin (TUR)	224 kg	Nikola Seničová (SVK)	206 kg	Ekaterina Vizgina (RUS)	203 kg
81 kg
Snatch	Liana Gyurjyan (ARM)	95 kg	Viktória Boros (HUN)	90 kg	Angelina Zubova (RUS)	89 kg
Clean & Jerk	Liana Gyurjyan (ARM)	120 kg	Angelina Zubova (RUS)	112 kg	Krystyna Borodina (UKR)	112 kg
Total	Liana Gyurjyan (ARM)	215 kg	Angelina Zubova (RUS)	201 kg	Krystyna Borodina (UKR)	197 kg
87 kg
Snatch	Daria Riazanova (RUS)	98 kg	Sarah Fischer (AUT)	97 kg	Tatiana Fedichkina (RUS)	94 kg
Clean & Jerk	Daria Riazanova (RUS)	132 kg	Sarah Fischer (AUT)	128 kg	Tatiana Fedichkina (RUS)	117 kg
Total	Daria Riazanova (RUS)	230 kg	Sarah Fischer (AUT)	225 kg	Tatiana Fedichkina (RUS)	211 kg
+87 kg
Snatch	Arpine Dalalyan (ARM)	100 kg	Magdalena Karolak (POL)	96 kg	Anastasiia Vlasenko (UKR)	94 kg
Clean & Jerk	Arpine Dalalyan (ARM)	134 kg	Magdalena Karolak (POL)	133 kg	Anastasiia Vlasenko (UKR)	117 kg
Total	Arpine Dalalyan (ARM)	234 kg	Magdalena Karolak (POL)	231 kg	Anastasiia Vlasenko (UKR)	218 kg

=== Under-23 ===
==== Men ====
Event	Gold		Silver		Bronze	
55 kg
Snatch	Daniel Lungu (MDA)	110 kg	Giorgi Dokvadze (GEO)	109 kg	Dmytro Voronovskyi (UKR)	108 kg
Clean & Jerk	Dmytro Voronovskyi (UKR)	137 kg	Leon Schedler (GER)	132 kg	Giorgi Dokvadze (GEO)	126 kg
Total	Dmytro Voronovskyi (UKR)	245 kg	Giorgi Dokvadze (GEO)	235 kg	Leon Schedler (GER)	234 kg
61 kg
Snatch	Goderdzi Berdelidze (GEO)	125 kg	Ferdi Hardal (TUR)	124 kg	Jon Luke Mau (GER)	116 kg
Clean & Jerk	Jon Luke Mau (GER)	159 kg	Goderdzi Berdelidze (GEO)	152 kg	Berkant Yiğit (TUR)	150 kg
Total	Goderdzi Berdelidze (GEO)	277 kg	Jon Luke Mau (GER)	275 kg	Berkant Yiğit (TUR)	261 kg
67 kg
Snatch	Mirko Zanni (ITA)	145 kg	Henadz Laptseu (BLR)	138 kg	Goga Chkheidze (GEO)	135 kg
Clean & Jerk	Mirko Zanni (ITA)	170 kg	Goga Chkheidze (GEO)	166 kg	Henadz Laptseu (BLR)	165 kg
Total	Mirko Zanni (ITA)	315 kg	Henadz Laptseu (BLR)	303 kg	Goga Chkheidze (GEO)	301 kg
73 kg
Snatch	Aslan Kaskulov (RUS)	143 kg	Salvatore Esposito (ITA)	139 kg	Arberi Cerciz (ALB)	136 kg
Clean & Jerk	Salvatore Esposito (ITA)	175 kg	Aslan Kaskulov (RUS)	170 kg	Elshad Sharifov (AZE)	160 kg
Total	Salvatore Esposito (ITA)	314 kg	Aslan Kaskulov (RUS)	313 kg	Arberi Cerciz (ALB)	295 kg
81 kg
Snatch	Bozhidar Andreev (BUL)	163 kg	Antonino Pizzolato (ITA)	161 kg	Viacheslav Iarkin (RUS)	157 kg
Clean & Jerk	Bozhidar Andreev (BUL)	198 kg	Viacheslav Iarkin (RUS)	194 kg	Antonino Pizzolato (ITA)	193 kg
Total	Bozhidar Andreev (BUL)	361 kg	Antonino Pizzolato (ITA)	354 kg	Viacheslav Iarkin (RUS)	351 kg
89 kg
Snatch	Revaz Davitadze (GEO)	168 kg	Hakob Mkrtchyan (ARM)	165 kg	Davit Hovhannisyan (ARM)	161 kg
Clean & Jerk	Hakob Mkrtchyan (ARM)	210 kg	Davit Hovhannisyan (ARM)	196 kg	Revaz Davitadze (GEO)	195 kg
Total	Hakob Mkrtchyan (ARM)	375 kg	Revaz Davitadze (GEO)	363 kg	Davit Hovhannisyan (ARM)	357 kg
96 kg
Snatch	Anton Pliesnoi (GEO)	173 kg	Volodymyr Hoza (UKR)	164 kg	Stanislav Maznitsyn (RUS)	163 kg
Clean & Jerk	Anton Pliesnoi (GEO)	215 kg	Stanislav Maznitsyn (RUS)	200 kg	Volodymyr Hoza (UKR)	200 kg
Total	Anton Pliesnoi (GEO)	388 kg	Volodymyr Hoza (UKR)	364 kg	Stanislav Maznitsyn (RUS)	363 kg
102 kg
Snatch	Kyryl Pyrohov (UKR)	165 kg	Aleksandr Kibanov (RUS)	164 kg	Kurt Perthel (GER)	161 kg
Clean & Jerk	Aleksandr Kibanov (RUS)	202 kg	Bohdan Buriachek (UKR)	196 kg	Kurt Perthel (GER)	194 kg
Total	Aleksandr Kibanov (RUS)	366 kg	Kyryl Pyrohov (UKR)	358 kg	Bohdan Buriachek (UKR)	356 kg
109 kg
Snatch	Marcos Ruiz (ESP)	177 kg	Samvel Gasparyan (ARM)	176 kg	Andrei Roman (ROU)	163 kg
Clean & Jerk	Samvel Gasparyan (ARM)	214 kg	Marcos Ruiz (ESP)	212 kg	Iunus Magamadov (RUS)	198 kg
Total	Samvel Gasparyan (ARM)	390 kg	Marcos Ruiz (ESP)	389 kg	Iunus Magamadov (RUS)	359 kg
+109 kg
Snatch	Simon Martirosyan (ARM)	198 kg	Eduard Ziaziulin (BLR)	197 kg	Aliaksei Mzhachyk (BLR)	183 kg
Clean & Jerk	Simon Martirosyan (ARM)	236 kg	Eduard Ziaziulin (BLR)	235 kg	Giorgi Chkheidze (GEO)	228 kg
Total	Simon Martirosyan (ARM)	434 kg	Eduard Ziaziulin (BLR)	432 kg	Giorgi Chkheidze (GEO)	410 kg

==== Women ====
Event	Gold		Silver		Bronze	
45 kg
Snatch	Alessandra Pagliaro (ITA)	66 kg	Paulina Kudłaszyk (POL)	59 kg		
Clean & Jerk	Alessandra Pagliaro (ITA)	85 kg	Paulina Kudłaszyk (POL)	74 kg		
Total	Alessandra Pagliaro (ITA)	151 kg	Paulina Kudłaszyk (POL)	133 kg		
49 kg
Snatch	Anhelina Lomachynska (UKR)	74 kg	Kseniia Kozina (RUS)	74 kg	Gamze Karakol (TUR)	72 kg
Clean & Jerk	Gamze Karakol (TUR)	92 kg	Anhelina Lomachynska (UKR)	89 kg	Iana Mokhina (RUS)	87 kg
Total	Gamze Karakol (TUR)	164 kg	Anhelina Lomachynska (UKR)	163 kg	Iana Mokhina (RUS)	155 kg
55 kg
Snatch	Liudmila Psyshanitsa (BLR)	83 kg	Fraer Morrow (GBR)	80 kg	Irina Furdik (RUS)	80 kg
Clean & Jerk	Fraer Morrow (GBR)	107 kg	Liudmila Psyshanitsa (BLR)	106 kg	Rebekka Tao Jacobsen (NOR)	105 kg
Total	Liudmila Psyshanitsa (BLR)	189 kg	Fraer Morrow (GBR)	187 kg	Rebekka Tao Jacobsen (NOR)	184 kg
59 kg
Snatch	Rebeka Koha (LAT)	100 kg	Olga Te (RUS)	95 kg	Florina Sorina Hulpan (ROU)	94 kg
Clean & Jerk	Rebeka Koha (LAT)	119 kg	Olga Te (RUS)	114 kg	Florina Sorina Hulpan (ROU)	113 kg
Total	Rebeka Koha (LAT)	219 kg	Olga Te (RUS)	209 kg	Florina Sorina Hulpan (ROU)	207 kg
64 kg
Snatch	Mădălina Molie (ROU)	90 kg	Nataliia Shaimanova (RUS)	90 kg	Daniela Gherman (SWE)	89 kg
Clean & Jerk	Nataliia Shaimanova (RUS)	112 kg	Mădălina Molie (ROU)	111 kg	Safiye Şıvgın (TUR)	104 kg
Total	Nataliia Shaimanova (RUS)	202 kg	Mădălina Molie (ROU)	201 kg	Daniela Gherman (SWE)	192 kg
71 kg
Snatch	Alina Marushchak (UKR)	101 kg	Anastasiia Anzorova (RUS)	100 kg	Lijana Jakaitė (LTU)	88 kg
Clean & Jerk	Anastasiia Anzorova (RUS)	126 kg	Alina Marushchak (UKR)	124 kg	Ilia Hernández (ESP)	118 kg
Total	Anastasiia Anzorova (RUS)	226 kg	Alina Marushchak (UKR)	225 kg	Ilia Hernández (ESP)	205 kg
76 kg
Snatch	Iryna Dekha (UKR)	112 kg	Nicole Rubanovich (ISR)	98 kg	Kseniia Marushka (RUS)	97 kg
Clean & Jerk	Iryna Dekha (UKR)	133 kg	Tatiana Tydyyakova (RUS)	120 kg	Weronika Zielińska (POL)	116 kg
Total	Iryna Dekha (UKR)	245 kg	Tatiana Tydyyakova (RUS)	216 kg	Weronika Zielińska (POL)	210 kg
81 kg
Snatch	Ecaterina Tretiacova (MDA)	88 kg	Eliza Wcisłak (POL)	85 kg	Anastasiia Manievska (UKR)	85 kg
Clean & Jerk	Ecaterina Tretiacova (MDA)	108 kg	Mirjam Polgár (HUN)	107 kg	Anastasiia Manievska (UKR)	104 kg
Total	Ecaterina Tretiacova (MDA)	196 kg	Anastasiia Manievska (UKR)	189 kg	Eliza Wcisłak (POL)	188 kg
87 kg
Snatch	Tatev Hakobyan (ARM)	105 kg	Elena Cîlcic (MDA)	100 kg	Tuğçe Boynueğri (TUR)	99 kg
Clean & Jerk	Elena Cîlcic (MDA)	131 kg	Kinga Kaczmarczyk (POL)	125 kg	Tatev Hakobyan (ARM)	125 kg
Total	Elena Cîlcic (MDA)	231 kg	Tatev Hakobyan (ARM)	230 kg	Kinga Kaczmarczyk (POL)	218 kg
+87 kg
Snatch	Melike Günal (TUR)	105 kg	Valentyna Kisil (UKR)	104 kg	Mercy Brown (GBR)	99 kg
Clean & Jerk	Melike Günal (TUR)	128 kg	Taisiia Chizhikova (RUS)	127 kg	Mercy Brown (GBR)	125 kg
Total	Melike Günal (TUR)	233 kg	Taisiia Chizhikova (RUS)	225 kg	Mercy Brown (GBR)	224 kg

== Medal table ==
Ranking by Big (Total result) medals

* Host nation (Romania)

Rank	Nation	Gold	Silver	Bronze	Total
1	Armenia	7	2	2	11
2	Turkey	6	2	4	12
3	Russia	5	8	8	21
4	Italy	5	1	1	7
5	Ukraine	3	7	6	16
6	Bulgaria	3	1	1	5
7	Moldova	3	0	0	3
8	Belarus	2	3	2	7
9	Georgia	2	2	2	6
10	Latvia	2	0	0	2
11	Romania*	1	5	4	10
12	Belgium	1	0	0	1
13	Poland	0	2	3	5
14	Germany	0	1	1	2
14	Great Britain	0	1	1	2
14	Spain	0	1	1	2
17	Austria	0	1	0	1
17	Finland	0	1	0	1
17	Netherlands	0	1	0	1
17	Slovakia	0	1	0	1
21	Albania	0	0	1	1
21	Norway	0	0	1	1
21	Sweden	0	0	1	1
Totals (23 entries)		40	40	39	119

Ranking by all medals: Big (Total result) and Small (Snatch and Clean & Jerk)

* Host nation (Romania)

Rank	Nation	Gold	Silver	Bronze	Total
1	Armenia	21	8	6	35
2	Turkey	17	8	13	38
3	Russia	14	25	22	61
4	Italy	13	5	5	23
5	Ukraine	11	16	16	43
6	Bulgaria	8	4	5	17
7	Moldova	8	3	0	11
8	Belarus	6	9	5	20
9	Georgia	6	5	7	18
10	Latvia	5	0	2	7
11	Romania*	4	11	10	25
12	Belgium	3	0	0	3
13	Germany	1	2	4	7
14	Great Britain	1	2	3	6
15	Spain	1	2	2	5
16	Finland	1	1	0	2
17	Poland	0	9	5	14
18	Austria	0	3	0	3
19	Hungary	0	2	1	3
19	Netherlands	0	2	1	3
19	Slovakia	0	2	1	3
22	Israel	0	1	0	1
23	Albania	0	0	2	2
23	Azerbaijan	0	0	2	2
23	Norway	0	0	2	2
23	Sweden	0	0	2	2
27	Lithuania	0	0	1	1
Totals (27 entries)		120	120	117	357
