= List of Moldovan records in Olympic weightlifting =

The following are the records of Moldova in Olympic weightlifting. Records are maintained in each weight class for the snatch lift, clean and jerk lift, and the total for both lifts by the Weightlifting Federation of Republic of Moldova.

== Current records ==
=== Men ===
Event	Record	Athlete	Date	Meet	Place	Ref
60 kg
Snatch						
Clean & Jerk						
Total						
65 kg
Snatch	124 kg	Dan Betca	29 October 2025	European Junior Championships	Durrës, Albania	
Clean & Jerk	154 kg	Dan Betca	29 October 2025	European Junior Championships	Durrës, Albania	
Total	278 kg	Dan Betca	29 October 2025	European Junior Championships	Durrës, Albania	
71 kg
Snatch						
Clean & Jerk						
Total						
79 kg
Snatch						
Clean & Jerk						
Total						
85 kg
Snatch	176 kg	Marin Robu	2 November 2026	World Championships	Ningbo, China	
Clean & Jerk	197 kg	Marin Robu	2 November 2026	World Championships	Ningbo, China	
Total	373 kg	Marin Robu	2 November 2026	World Championships	Ningbo, China	
94 kg
Snatch						
Clean & Jerk						
Total						
110 kg
Snatch						
Clean & Jerk						
Total						
+110 kg
Snatch						
Clean & Jerk						
Total						

=== Women ===
Event	Record	Athlete	Date	Meet	Place	Ref
48 kg
Snatch						
Clean & Jerk						
Total						
53 kg
Snatch						
Clean & Jerk						
Total						
58 kg
Snatch	91 kg	Nicoleta Cojocaru	3 May 2026	World Junior Championships	Ismailia, Egypt	
Clean & Jerk	114 kg	Nicoleta Cojocaru	7 July 2026	World Youth Championships	Cali, Colombia	
Total	202 kg	Nicoleta Cojocaru	7 July 2026	World Youth Championships	Cali, Colombia	
63 kg
Snatch						
Clean & Jerk						
Total						
69 kg
Snatch						
Clean & Jerk						
Total						
77 kg
Snatch						
Clean & Jerk						
Total						
86 kg
Snatch						
Clean & Jerk						
Total						
+86 kg
Snatch						
Clean & Jerk						
Total						

== Historical records ==
=== Men (2018–2025) ===
Event	Record	Athlete	Date	Meet	Place	Ref
55 kg
Snatch	113 kg	Daniel Lungu	4 April 2021	European Championships	Moscow, Russia	
Clean & Jerk	127 kg	Daniel Lungu	4 April 2021	European Championships	Moscow, Russia	
Total	240 kg	Daniel Lungu	4 April 2021	European Championships	Moscow, Russia	
61 kg
Snatch	124 kg	Daniel Lungu	4 September 2023	World Championships	Riyadh, Saudi Arabia	
Clean & Jerk	140 kg	Daniel Lungu	4 September 2023	World Championships	Riyadh, Saudi Arabia	
Total	264 kg	Daniel Lungu	4 September 2023	World Championships	Riyadh, Saudi Arabia	
67 kg
Snatch	123 kg	Daniel Lungu	7 December 2023	IWF Grand Prix	Doha, Qatar	
Clean & Jerk	141 kg	Daniel Lungu	7 December 2023	IWF Grand Prix	Doha, Qatar	
Total	264 kg	Daniel Lungu	7 December 2023	IWF Grand Prix	Doha, Qatar	
73 kg
Snatch	156 kg	Marin Robu	6 April 2021	European Championships	Moscow, Russia	
Clean & Jerk	183 kg	Marin Robu	6 April 2021	European Championships	Moscow, Russia	
Total	339 kg	Marin Robu	6 April 2021	European Championships	Moscow, Russia	
81 kg
Snatch	168 kg	Marin Robu	12 December 2021	World Championships	Tashkent, Uzbekistan	
Clean & Jerk	195 kg	Marin Robu	12 December 2021	World Championships	Tashkent, Uzbekistan	
Total	363 kg	Marin Robu	12 December 2021	World Championships	Tashkent, Uzbekistan	
89 kg
Snatch	173 kg	Marin Robu	11 September 2023	World Championships	Riyadh, Saudi Arabia	
Clean & Jerk	198 kg	Marin Robu	20 April 2023	European Championships	Yerevan, Armenia	
Total	370 kg	Marin Robu	11 September 2023	World Championships	Riyadh, Saudi Arabia	
96 kg
Snatch	155 kg	Tudor Ciobanu	21 April 2023	European Championships	Yerevan, Armenia	
Clean & Jerk	185 kg	Tudor Ciobanu	21 April 2023	European Championships	Yerevan, Armenia	
Total	340 kg	Tudor Ciobanu	21 April 2023	European Championships	Yerevan, Armenia	
102 kg
Snatch	173 kg	Tudor Bratu	8 April 2024	World Cup	Phuket, Thailand	
Clean & Jerk	205 kg	Tudor Bratu	8 April 2024	World Cup	Phuket, Thailand	
Total	378 kg	Tudor Bratu	8 April 2024	World Cup	Phuket, Thailand	
109 kg
Snatch	153 kg	Artiom Gritenco	22 April 2023	European Championships	Yerevan, Armenia	
Clean & Jerk	181 kg	Artiom Gritenco	22 April 2023	European Championships	Yerevan, Armenia	
Total	334 kg	Artiom Gritenco	22 April 2023	European Championships	Yerevan, Armenia	
+109 kg
Snatch						
Clean & Jerk						
Total						

=== Women (2018–2025) ===
Event	Record	Athlete	Date	Meet	Place	Ref
45 kg
Snatch	70 kg	Teodora-Luminița Hîncu	8 December 2021	World Championships	Tashkent, Uzbekistan	
Clean & Jerk	85 kg	Teodora-Luminița Hîncu	8 December 2021	World Championships	Tashkent, Uzbekistan	
Total	155 kg	Teodora-Luminița Hîncu	8 December 2021	World Championships	Tashkent, Uzbekistan	
49 kg
Snatch	71 kg	Teodora Luminița Hincu	3 April 2021	European Championships	Moscow, Russia	
Clean & Jerk	84 kg	Teodora Luminița Hincu	3 April 2021	European Championships	Moscow, Russia	
Total	155 kg	Teodora Luminița Hincu	3 April 2021	European Championships	Moscow, Russia	
55 kg
Snatch						
Clean & Jerk						
Total						
59 kg
Snatch						
Clean & Jerk						
Total						
64 kg
Snatch						
Clean & Jerk						
Total						
71 kg
Snatch	94 kg	Natalia Prișcepa	13 December 2021	World Championships	Tashkent, Uzbekistan	
Clean & Jerk	114 kg	Natalia Prișcepa	7 April 2021	European Championships	Moscow, Russia	
Total	206 kg	Natalia Prișcepa	7 April 2021	European Championships	Moscow, Russia	
76 kg
Snatch	98 kg	Natalia Priscepa	20 April 2023	European Championships	Yerevan, Armenia	
Clean & Jerk	118 kg	Natalia Priscepa	20 April 2023	European Championships	Yerevan, Armenia	
Total	216 kg	Natalia Priscepa	20 April 2023	European Championships	Yerevan, Armenia	
81 kg
Snatch	108 kg	Elena Erighina	9 April 2024	World Cup	Phuket, Thailand	
Clean & Jerk	132 kg	Elena Erighina	9 April 2024	World Cup	Phuket, Thailand	
Total	240 kg	Elena Erighina	9 April 2024	World Cup	Phuket, Thailand	
87 kg
Snatch	107 kg	Elena Cîlcic	10 April 2021	European Championships	Moscow, Russia	
Clean & Jerk	138 kg	Elena Cîlcic	10 April 2021	European Championships	Moscow, Russia	
Total	245 kg	Elena Cîlcic	10 April 2021	European Championships	Moscow, Russia	
+87 kg
Snatch						
Clean & Jerk						
Total						

== Historical records ==
=== Men (1998–2018) ===
Event	Record	Athlete	Date	Meet	Place	Ref
-56 kg
Snatch						
Clean and jerk						
Total						
-62 kg
Snatch						
Clean & Jerk						
Total						
-69 kg
Snatch	144 kg	Serghei Cechir	9 August 2016	Olympic Games	Rio de Janeiro, Brazil	
Clean & Jerk	178 kg	Serghei Cechir	9 August 2016	Olympic Games	Rio de Janeiro, Brazil	
Total	322 kg	Serghei Cechir	9 August 2016	Olympic Games	Rio de Janeiro, Brazil	
-77 kg
Snatch						
Clean and jerk						
Total						
-85 kg
Snatch						
Clean and jerk						
Total						
-94 kg
Snatch	185 kg	Anatol Ciricu	24 February 2012	Moldova Championships	Chişinău, Moldova	
Clean and jerk						
Total	405 kg	Anatol Ciricu	24 February 2012	Moldova Championships	Chişinău, Moldova	
-105 kg
Snatch						
Clean and jerk						
Total						
+105 kg
Snatch						
Clean and jerk						
Total						

=== Women (1998–2018) ===
Event	Record	Athlete	Date	Meet	Place	Ref
-48 kg
Snatch						
Clean and jerk						
Total						
-53 kg
Snatch	99 kg	Cristina Iovu	29 July 2012	Olympic Games	London, Great Britain	
Clean and jerk	116 kg	Cristina Iovu	10 April 2012	European Championships	Antalya, Turkey	
Total						
-58 kg
Snatch						
Clean and jerk						
Total						
-63 kg
Snatch						
Clean and jerk						
Total						
-69 kg
Snatch						
Clean and jerk						
Total						
-75 kg
Snatch						
Clean and jerk						
Total						
+75 kg
Snatch						
Clean and jerk						
Total						
