= 2019 Junior World Weightlifting Championships =

- Venue: National Gymnasium
- Location: Suva, Fiji
- Dates: 1–8 June
- Competitors: 235 from 46 nations

The 2019 Junior World Weightlifting Championships were held in Suva, Fiji at the National Gymnasium from 1 to 8 June 2019.

== Medal table ==
Ranking by Big (Total result) medals

Rank	Nation	Gold	Silver	Bronze	Total
1	China (CHN)	4	0	0	4
2	Kazakhstan (KAZ)	2	1	0	3
3	United States (USA)	2	0	2	4
4	Egypt (EGY)	2	0	0	2
4	Uzbekistan (UZB)	2	0	0	2
6	Turkey (TUR)	1	3	4	8
7	South Korea (KOR)	1	3	0	4
8	Samoa (SAM)	1	1	0	2
8	Vietnam (VIE)	1	1	0	2
10	Armenia (ARM)	1	0	0	1
10	Georgia (GEO)	1	0	0	1
10	Italy (ITA)	1	0	0	1
10	Latvia (LAT)	1	0	0	1
14	Russia (RUS)	0	2	5	7
15	Iran (IRI)	0	2	3	5
16	Colombia (COL)	0	2	0	2
17	Japan (JPN)	0	1	1	2
18	Belarus (BLR)	0	1	0	1
18	Ecuador (ECU)	0	1	0	1
18	Indonesia (INA)	0	1	0	1
18	Moldova (MDA)	0	1	0	1
22	Chinese Taipei (TPE)	0	0	1	1
22	New Zealand (NZL)	0	0	1	1
22	Poland (POL)	0	0	1	1
22	Tunisia (TUN)	0	0	1	1
22	Turkmenistan (TKM)	0	0	1	1
Totals (26 entries)		20	20	20	60

Ranking by all medals: Big (Total result) and Small (Snatch and Clean & Jerk)

Rank	Nation	Gold	Silver	Bronze	Total
1	China (CHN)	11	1	1	13
2	Kazakhstan (KAZ)	6	2	0	8
3	Uzbekistan (UZB)	6	0	0	6
4	United States (USA)	5	1	7	13
5	Egypt (EGY)	5	1	0	6
6	South Korea (KOR)	3	8	0	11
7	Vietnam (VIE)	3	3	0	6
8	Samoa (SAM)	3	2	0	5
9	Turkey (TUR)	2	8	11	21
10	Iran (IRI)	2	4	9	15
11	Colombia (COL)	2	3	2	7
12	Armenia (ARM)	2	1	2	5
13	Georgia (GEO)	2	1	1	4
13	Italy (ITA)	2	1	1	4
15	Latvia (LAT)	2	1	0	3
16	Japan (JPN)	1	2	1	4
17	Belarus (BLR)	1	2	0	3
18	Moldova (MDA)	1	1	1	3
19	New Zealand (NZL)	1	0	1	2
20	Russia (RUS)	0	8	10	18
21	Indonesia (INA)	0	4	0	4
22	Ecuador (ECU)	0	3	0	3
23	Poland (POL)	0	1	1	2
23	Tunisia (TUN)	0	1	1	2
25	Romania (ROU)	0	1	0	1
26	Chinese Taipei (TPE)	0	0	5	5
27	Ukraine (UKR)	0	0	2	2
28	Brazil (BRA)	0	0	1	1
28	Bulgaria (BUL)	0	0	1	1
28	Mongolia (MGL)	0	0	1	1
28	Turkmenistan (TKM)	0	0	1	1
Totals (31 entries)		60	60	60	180

== Medal overview ==
=== Men ===
Event		Gold		Silver		Bronze	
– 55 kg	Snatch	Yuto Yamaguchi; Japan	103 kg	Sergio Massidda; Italy	102 kg	Lin Zhi-ting; Chinese Taipei	98 kg
– 55 kg	Clean & Jerk	Sergio Massidda; Italy	131 kg	Kaito Kubo; Japan	128 kg	Lin Zhi-ting; Chinese Taipei	121 kg
– 55 kg	Total	Sergio Massidda; Italy	233 kg	Kaito Kubo; Japan	224 kg	Yuto Yamaguchi; Japan	223 kg
– 61 kg	Snatch	Caner Toptaş; Turkey	125 kg	Doğan Dönen; Turkey	121 kg YWR	Estiven Villar; Colombia	120 kg
– 61 kg	Clean & Jerk	Bae Moon-su; South Korea	155 kg	Muhammad Faathir; Indonesia	149 kg YWR	Doğan Dönen; Turkey	148 kg
– 61 kg	Total	Caner Toptaş; Turkey	273 kg	Bae Moon-su; South Korea	270 kg	Doğan Dönen; Turkey	269 kg YWR
– 67 kg	Snatch	Adkhamjon Ergashev; Uzbekistan	141 kg	Zulfat Garaev; Russia	137 kg	Muhammed Furkan Özbek; Turkey	135 kg
– 67 kg	Clean & Jerk	Adkhamjon Ergashev; Uzbekistan	173 kg	Muhammed Furkan Özbek; Turkey	172 kg	Wei Yunban; China	165 kg
– 67 kg	Total	Adkhamjon Ergashev; Uzbekistan	314 kg	Muhammed Furkan Özbek; Turkey	307 kg	Zulfat Garaev; Russia	300 kg
– 73 kg	Snatch	Marin Robu; Moldova	147 kg	Clarence Cummings; United States	145 kg	Archil Malakmadze; Georgia	142 kg
– 73 kg	Clean & Jerk	Clarence Cummings; United States	192 kg JWR	Paul Dumitraşcu; Romania	175 kg	Marin Robu; Moldova	173 kg
– 73 kg	Total	Clarence Cummings; United States	337 kg	Marin Robu; Moldova	320 kg	Maksat Meredow; Turkmenistan	312 kg
– 81 kg	Snatch	Ritvars Suharevs; Latvia	156 kg	Juan Solís; Colombia	155 kg	Hossein Soltani; Iran	154 kg
– 81 kg	Clean & Jerk	Juan Solís; Colombia	195 kg	Ritvars Suharevs; Latvia	195 kg	Hossein Soltani; Iran	191 kg
– 81 kg	Total	Ritvars Suharevs; Latvia	351 kg	Juan Solís; Colombia	350 kg	Hossein Soltani; Iran	345 kg
– 89 kg	Snatch	Mohammad Hosseini; Iran	157 kg	Yeom Da-hoon; South Korea	156 kg	Karen Avagyan; Armenia	155 kg
– 89 kg	Clean & Jerk	Don Opeloge; Samoa	198 kg	Bartłomiej Adamus; Poland	192 kg	Mohammad Hosseini; Iran	191 kg
– 89 kg	Total	Don Opeloge; Samoa	349 kg	Mohammad Hosseini; Iran	348 kg	Bartłomiej Adamus; Poland	346 kg
– 96 kg	Snatch	Ahmed Ashour; Egypt	165 kg	Afshin Taheri; Iran	161 kg	Artur Babayan; Russia	160 kg YWR
– 96 kg	Clean & Jerk	Ahmed Ashour; Egypt	200 kg	Artyom Antropov; Kazakhstan	197 kg	Jaden Washington; United States	188 kg
– 96 kg	Total	Ahmed Ashour; Egypt	365 kg	Artyom Antropov; Kazakhstan	352 kg	Artur Babayan; Russia	346 kg
– 102 kg	Snatch	Andrei Arlionak; Belarus	169 kg	Irakli Chkheidze; Georgia	167 kg	Amir Azizi; Iran	165 kg
– 102 kg	Clean & Jerk	Irakli Chkheidze; Georgia	204 kg	Andrei Arlionak; Belarus	201 kg	Amir Azizi; Iran	195 kg
– 102 kg	Total	Irakli Chkheidze; Georgia	371 kg	Andrei Arlionak; Belarus	370 kg	Amir Azizi; Iran	360 kg
– 109 kg	Snatch	Akbar Djuraev; Uzbekistan	182 kg	Daniil Vagaitsev; Russia	175 kg	Hristo Hristov; Bulgaria	175 kg
– 109 kg	Clean & Jerk	Akbar Djuraev; Uzbekistan	216 kg	Hwang Sang-un; South Korea	210 kg	Daniil Vagaitsev; Russia	206 kg
– 109 kg	Total	Akbar Djuraev; Uzbekistan	398 kg	Hwang Sang-un; South Korea	384 kg	Daniil Vagaitsev; Russia	381 kg
+ 109 kg	Snatch	Ali Davoudi; Iran	193 kg	Varazdat Lalayan; Armenia	192 kg	Oleh Hanzenko; Ukraine	172 kg
+ 109 kg	Clean & Jerk	Varazdat Lalayan; Armenia	227 kg	Alireza Yousefi; Iran	225 kg YWR	Ali Davoudi; Iran	225 kg
+ 109 kg	Total	Varazdat Lalayan; Armenia	419 kg	Ali Davoudi; Iran	418 kg	Alireza Yousefi; Iran	396 kg YWR

=== Women ===
Event		Gold		Silver		Bronze	
– 45 kg	Snatch	Khổng Mỹ Phượng; Vietnam	74 kg	Phạm Đình Thi; Vietnam	69 kg	Ayşe Doğan; Turkey	68 kg
– 45 kg	Clean & Jerk	Phạm Đình Thi; Vietnam	85 kg	Khổng Mỹ Phượng; Vietnam	84 kg	Ayşe Doğan; Turkey	83 kg
– 45 kg	Total	Khổng Mỹ Phượng; Vietnam	158 kg	Phạm Đình Thi; Vietnam	154 kg	Ayşe Doğan; Turkey	151 kg
– 49 kg	Snatch	Zhao Jinhong; China	81 kg	Windy Cantika Aisah; Indonesia	81 kg YWR	Giulia Imperio; Italy	75 kg
– 49 kg	Clean & Jerk	Zhao Jinhong; China	110 kg	Windy Cantika Aisah; Indonesia	98 kg YWR	Hayley Reichardt; United States	98 kg
– 49 kg	Total	Zhao Jinhong; China	191 kg	Windy Cantika Aisah; Indonesia	179 kg YWR	Hayley Reichardt; United States	172 kg
– 55 kg	Snatch	Yenny Sinisterra; Colombia	92 kg	Gan Hongyan; China	91 kg	Kamila Konotop; Ukraine	91 kg
– 55 kg	Clean & Jerk	Gan Hongyan; China	114 kg	Kristina Novitskaia; Russia	113 kg	Yenny Sinisterra; Colombia	112 kg
– 55 kg	Total	Gan Hongyan; China	205 kg	Yenny Sinisterra; Colombia	204 kg	Kristina Novitskaia; Russia	197 kg
– 59 kg	Snatch	Luo Xiaomin; China	101 kg	Chaima Rahmouni; Tunisia	88 kg	Peyton Brown; United States	87 kg
– 59 kg	Clean & Jerk	Luo Xiaomin; China	120 kg	Ayşegül Çakın; Turkey	110 kg	Nicole Cintra Lagos; Brazil	107 kg
– 59 kg	Total	Luo Xiaomin; China	221 kg	Ayşegül Çakın; Turkey	196 kg	Chaima Rahmouni; Tunisia	195 kg
– 64 kg	Snatch	Liao Guifang; China	102 kg	Angie Palacios; Ecuador	101 kg	Nuray Levent; Turkey	95 kg
– 64 kg	Clean & Jerk	Liao Guifang; China	128 kg	Angie Palacios; Ecuador	119 kg	Nuray Levent; Turkey	118 kg
– 64 kg	Total	Liao Guifang; China	230 kg	Angie Palacios; Ecuador	220 kg	Nuray Levent; Turkey	213 kg
– 71 kg	Snatch	Katherine Nye; United States	109 kg	Evgeniia Guseva; Russia	97 kg	Darkhijav Otgonbayar; Mongolia	93 kg
– 71 kg	Clean & Jerk	Katherine Nye; United States	137 kg	Berfin Altun; Turkey	118 kg	Evgeniia Guseva; Russia	115 kg
– 71 kg	Total	Katherine Nye; United States	246 kg	Evgeniia Guseva; Russia	212 kg	Berfin Altun; Turkey	206 kg
– 76 kg	Snatch	Kanah Andrews-Nahu; New Zealand	98 kg	Rania Ezzat; Egypt	97 kg	Dilara Narin; Turkey	95 kg
– 76 kg	Clean & Jerk	Rania Ezzat; Egypt	122 kg	Dilara Narin; Turkey	122 kg	Athena Schrijver; United States	115 kg
– 76 kg	Total	Rania Ezzat; Egypt	219 kg	Dilara Narin; Turkey	217 kg	Kanah Andrews-Nahu; New Zealand	212 kg
– 81 kg	Snatch	Karina Kuzganbayeva; Kazakhstan	98 kg	Jang Hyeon-ju; South Korea	97 kg	Ekaterina Vizgina; Russia	93 kg
– 81 kg	Clean & Jerk	Karina Kuzganbayeva; Kazakhstan	126 kg	Jang Hyeon-ju; South Korea	124 kg	Tatiana Fedichkina; Russia	115 kg
– 81 kg	Total	Karina Kuzganbayeva; Kazakhstan	224 kg	Jang Hyeon-ju; South Korea	221 kg	Ekaterina Vizgina; Russia	206 kg
– 87 kg	Snatch	Darya Akhmerova; Kazakhstan	103 kg	Daria Riazanova; Russia	102 kg	Yu Ssu-han; Chinese Taipei	84 kg
– 87 kg	Clean & Jerk	Darya Akhmerova; Kazakhstan	133 kg	Daria Riazanova; Russia	125 kg	Yu Ssu-han; Chinese Taipei	108 kg
– 87 kg	Total	Darya Akhmerova; Kazakhstan	236 kg	Daria Riazanova; Russia	227 kg	Yu Ssu-han; Chinese Taipei	192 kg
+ 87 kg	Snatch	Feagaiga Stowers; Samoa	124 kg	Lee Seon-mi; South Korea	123 kg	Ashamarie Benitez Rivera; United States	108 kg
+ 87 kg	Clean & Jerk	Lee Seon-mi; South Korea	153 kg	Feagaiga Stowers; Samoa	151 kg	Arpine Dalalayan; Armenia	140 kg
+ 87 kg	Total	Lee Seon-mi; South Korea	276 kg	Feagaiga Stowers; Samoa	275 kg	Ashamarie Benitez Rivera; United States	245 kg

== Team ranking ==
Rank	Men's		Women's	
Rank	Team	Points	Team	Points
1	Iran	622	United States	615
2	United States	552	South Korea	431
3	Japan	521	Turkey	409
4	Turkey	346	Russia	405
5	Poland	300	Chinese Taipei	346
6	Belarus	281	China	333
7	Armenia	269	New Zealand	266
8	South Korea	267	Canada	252
9	Chinese Taipei	237	Japan	241
10	Georgia	234	Nauru	201

== Points ==
Rank	Men's				Women's			
Rank	Athlete	Body Weight	Total	Points	Athlete	Body Weight	Total	Points
1	Clarence Cummings (USA)	72.85	342	440.23	Luo Xiaomin (CHN)	58.80	221	302.51
2	Akbar Djuraev (UZB)	108.55	398	429.16	Katherine Nye (USA)	70.70	246	301.98
3	Ritvars Suharevs (LAT)	80.45	351	428.16	Zhao Jinhong (CHN)	48.55	191	300.05
4	Juan Solís (COL)	80.40	350	427.07	Liao Guifang (CHN)	63.85	230	299.01
5	Adkhamjon Ergashev (UZB)	66.55	314	426.87	Gan Hongyan (CHN)	54.70	205	294.71
6	Varazdat Lalayan (ARM)	142.75	419	424.88	Yenny Sinisterra (COL)	54.95	204	292.34
7	Hossein Soltani (IRI)	79.15	345	424.38	Angie Palacios (ECU)	63.45	220	287.09
8	Ali Davoudi (IRI)	150.00	418	421.38	Kristina Novitskaia (RUS)	54.70	197	283.21
9	Muhammed Furkan Özbek (TUR)	66.75	307	416.57	Windy Cantika Aisah (INA)	48.20	179	282.80
10	Hwang Sang-un (KOR)	108.00	384	414.73	Feagaiga Stowers (SAM)	116.20	275	282.40

== Participating nations ==
- Algeria (1)
- Argentina (1)
- Armenia (5)
- Australia (2)
- Azerbaijan (2)
- Belarus (5)
- Brazil (2)
- Bulgaria (1)
- Canada (6)
- Chile (3)
- China (8)
- Chinese Taipei (12)
- Colombia (3)
- Czech Republic (2)
- Denmark (2)
- Ecuador (2)
- Egypt (3)
- Fiji (8)
- France (3)
- Georgia (4)
- Indonesia (7)
- Iran (10)
- Italy (5)
- Japan (15)
- Kazakhstan (5)
- Kosovo (1)
- Kyrgyzstan (1)
- Latvia (1)
- Marshall Islands (1)
- Moldova (2)
- Mongolia (2)
- Nauru (9)
- New Zealand (6)
- Poland (11)
- Romania (3)
- Russia (9)
- Samoa (6)
- Slovakia (2)
- South Korea (14)
- Tunisia (3)
- Turkey (12)
- Turkmenistan (4)
- Ukraine (4)
- United States (20)
- Uzbekistan (2)
- Vietnam (5)
