= 2021 European Weightlifting Championships =

Russian Weightlifting Championship

- Venue: Palace of Gymnastics Irina Viner-Usmanova
- Location: Moscow, Russia
- Dates: 3–11 April
- Competitors: 160 W + 155 M = 315 Total from 38 nations

The 2021 European Weightlifting Championships took place in Moscow, Russia, from 3 to 11 April 2021.

== Medal table ==
Note: Daniyar İsmayilov, who originally won the gold medal in the men's 73kg event, was disqualified after he tested positive for a banned substance; his medals have not yet been reallocated.

Ranking by Big (Total result) medals

* Host nation (Russia)

Rank	Nation	Gold	Silver	Bronze	Total
1	Ukraine (UKR)	4	1	1	6
2	Bulgaria (BUL)	3	3	1	7
3	Russia (RUS)*	2	3	5	10
4	Armenia (ARM)	2	2	4	8
5	Georgia (GEO)	2	2	0	4
6	Romania (ROU)	2	1	2	5
7	Great Britain (GBR)	2	1	0	3
8	Italy (ITA)	1	2	0	3
9	Turkey (TUR)	1	0	3	4
10	France (FRA)	0	2	0	2
10	Moldova (MDA)	0	2	0	2
12	Belarus (BLR)	0	1	0	1
13	Albania (ALB)	0	0	1	1
13	Azerbaijan (AZE)	0	0	1	1
13	Belgium (BEL)	0	0	1	1
13	Latvia (LAT)	0	0	1	1
Totals (16 entries)		19	20	20	59

Ranking by all medals: Big (Total result) and Small (Snatch and Clean & Jerk)

* Host nation (Russia)

Rank	Nation	Gold	Silver	Bronze	Total
1	Ukraine (UKR)	10	3	4	17
2	Bulgaria (BUL)	8	8	3	19
3	Georgia (GEO)	8	4	1	13
4	Romania (ROU)	7	4	2	13
5	Armenia (ARM)	5	9	9	23
6	Great Britain (GBR)	5	4	0	9
7	Russia (RUS)*	4	10	12	26
8	Italy (ITA)	3	4	3	10
9	Moldova (MDA)	2	3	1	6
10	Turkey (TUR)	2	2	11	15
11	Germany (GER)	2	1	1	4
12	France (FRA)	1	4	0	5
13	Azerbaijan (AZE)	1	0	1	2
14	Belarus (BLR)	0	2	3	5
15	Albania (ALB)	0	1	2	3
16	Poland (POL)	0	1	1	2
17	Norway (NOR)	0	0	2	2
17	Spain (ESP)	0	0	2	2
19	Belgium (BEL)	0	0	1	1
19	Latvia (LAT)	0	0	1	1
Totals (20 entries)		58	60	60	178

== Medal overview ==
=== Men ===
Event		Gold		Silver		Bronze	
–55 kg	Snatch	Daniel Lungu (MDA)	113 kg	Muammer Şahin (TUR)	112 kg	Angel Rusev (BUL)	111 kg
–55 kg	Clean & Jerk	Angel Rusev (BUL)	147 kg	Valentin Iancu (ROU)	140 kg	Dmytro Voronovskyi (UKR)	137 kg
–55 kg	Total	Angel Rusev (BUL)	258 kg	Valentin Iancu (ROU)	248 kg	Dmytro Voronovskyi (UKR)	247 kg
–61 kg	Snatch	Stilyan Grozdev (BUL)	136 kg	Shota Mishvelidze (GEO)	135 kg	Henadz Laptseu (BLR)	132 kg
–61 kg	Clean & Jerk	Jon Luke Mau (GER)	162 kg	Stilyan Grozdev (BUL)	160 kg	Davide Ruiu (ITA)	158 kg
–61 kg	Total	Stilyan Grozdev (BUL)	296 kg	Shota Mishvelidze (GEO)	290 kg	Ferdi Hardal (TUR)	287 kg
–67 kg	Snatch	Mirko Zanni (ITA)	148 kg	Zulfat Garaev (RUS)	147 kg	Muhammed Furkan Özbek (TUR)	145 kg
–67 kg	Clean & Jerk	Muhammed Furkan Özbek (TUR)	178 kg	Valentin Genchev (BUL)	177 kg	Goga Chkheidze (GEO)	170 kg
–67 kg	Total	Muhammed Furkan Özbek (TUR)	323 kg	Mirko Zanni (ITA)	318 kg	Valentin Genchev (BUL)	315 kg
–73 kg	Snatch	~~Daniyar İsmayilov (TUR)~~	~~160 kg~~	Marin Robu (MDA)	156 kg	Bozhidar Andreev (BUL)	152 kg
–73 kg	Clean & Jerk	Max Lang (GER)	185 kg	Briken Calja (ALB)	184 kg	David Sánchez (ESP)	183 kg
–73 kg	Total	~~Daniyar İsmayilov (TUR)~~	~~341 kg~~	Marin Robu (MDA)	339 kg	Briken Calja (ALB)	336 kg
–81 kg	Snatch	Antonino Pizzolato (ITA)	164 kg	Karlos Nasar (BUL)	163 kg	Nico Müller (GER)	158 kg
–81 kg	Clean & Jerk	Karlos Nasar (BUL)	206 kg	Antonino Pizzolato (ITA)	206 kg	Rafik Harutyunyan (ARM)	196 kg
–81 kg	Total	Antonino Pizzolato (ITA)	370 kg	Karlos Nasar (BUL)	369 kg	Ritvars Suharevs (LAT)	347 kg
–89 kg	Snatch	Karen Avagyan (ARM)	175 kg	Revaz Davitadze (GEO)	171 kg	Andranik Karapetyan (ARM)	170 kg
–89 kg	Clean & Jerk	Revaz Davitadze (GEO)	203 kg	Karen Avagyan (ARM)	200 kg	Roman Chepik (RUS)	198 kg
–89 kg	Total	Karen Avagyan (ARM)	375 kg	Revaz Davitadze (GEO)	374 kg	Andranik Karapetyan (ARM)	365 kg
–96 kg	Snatch	Anton Pliesnoi (GEO)	180 kg	Petr Asayonak (BLR)	172 kg	Artur Babayan (RUS)	167 kg
–96 kg	Clean & Jerk	Anton Pliesnoi (GEO)	213 kg	Hakob Mkrtchyan (ARM)	212 kg	Bartłomiej Adamus (POL)	206 kg
–96 kg	Total	Anton Pliesnoi (GEO)	393 kg	Petr Asayonak (BLR)	374 kg	Hakob Mkrtchyan (ARM)	372 kg
–102 kg	Snatch	Dadash Dadashbayli (AZE)	177 kg	Samvel Gasparyan (ARM)	176 kg	Siarhei Sharankou (BLR)	172 kg
–102 kg	Clean & Jerk	Samvel Gasparyan (ARM)	214 kg	David Fischerov (BUL)	210 kg	Arsen Martirosyan (ARM)	209 kg
–102 kg	Total	Samvel Gasparyan (ARM)	390 kg	Arsen Martirosyan (ARM)	380 kg	Dadash Dadashbayli (AZE)	379 kg
–109 kg	Snatch	Simon Martirosyan (ARM)	190 kg	Hristo Hristov (BUL)	186 kg	Timur Naniev (RUS)	184 kg
–109 kg	Clean & Jerk	Dmytro Chumak (UKR)	226 kg	Arsen Kasabijew (POL)	220 kg	Marcos Ruiz (ESP)	220 kg
–109 kg	Total	Dmytro Chumak (UKR)	407 kg	Hristo Hristov (BUL)	406 kg	Timur Naniev (RUS)	401 kg
+109 kg	Snatch	Lasha Talakhadze (GEO)	222 kg WR	Gor Minasyan (ARM)	216 kg	Varazdat Lalayan (ARM)	205 kg
+109 kg	Clean & Jerk	Lasha Talakhadze (GEO)	263 kg	Gor Minasyan (ARM)	248 kg	Varazdat Lalayan (ARM)	240 kg
+109 kg	Total	Lasha Talakhadze (GEO)	485 kg WR	Gor Minasyan (ARM)	464 kg	Varazdat Lalayan (ARM)	445 kg

=== Women ===
Event		Gold		Silver		Bronze	
–45 kg	Snatch	Nadezhda Nguen (BUL)	72 kg	Melisa Güneş (TUR)	68 kg	Anhelina Lomachynska (UKR)	67 kg
–45 kg	Clean & Jerk	Ivana Petrova (BUL)	85 kg	Cosmina Pana (ROU)	84 kg	Melisa Güneş (TUR)	83 kg
–45 kg	Total	Nadezhda Nguen (BUL)	155 kg	Ivana Petrova (BUL)	152 kg	Melisa Güneş (TUR)	151 kg
–49 kg	Snatch	Monica Csengeri (ROU)	86 kg	Kristina Sobol (RUS)	85 kg	Giulia Imperio (ITA)	81 kg
–49 kg	Clean & Jerk	Monica Csengeri (ROU)	103 kg	Mihaela Cambei (ROU)	100 kg	Şaziye Erdoğan (TUR)	97 kg
–49 kg	Total	Monica Csengeri (ROU)	189 kg	Kristina Sobol (RUS)	181 kg	Mihaela Cambei (ROU)	180 kg
–55 kg	Snatch	Kamila Konotop (UKR)	95 kg	Izabella Yaylyan (ARM)	90 kg	Evagjelia Veli (ALB)	89 kg
–55 kg	Clean & Jerk	Kamila Konotop (UKR)	113 kg	Svetlana Ershova (RUS)	112 kg	Sümeyye Kentli (TUR)	110 kg
–55 kg	Total	Kamila Konotop (UKR)	208 kg	Svetlana Ershova (RUS)	200 kg	Nina Sterckx (BEL)	197 kg
–59 kg	Snatch	Olga Te (RUS)	95 kg	Dora Tchakounté (FRA)	95 kg	Aleksandra Kozlova (RUS)	91 kg
–59 kg	Clean & Jerk	Olga Te (RUS)	115 kg	Dora Tchakounté (FRA)	115 kg	Ine Andersson (NOR)	113 kg
–59 kg	Total	Olga Te (RUS)	210 kg	Dora Tchakounté (FRA)	210 kg	Aleksandra Kozlova (RUS)	202 kg
–64 kg	Snatch	Loredana Toma (ROU)	114 kg	Sarah Davies (GBR)	101 kg	Anastasiia Anzorova (RUS)	100 kg
–64 kg	Clean & Jerk	Loredana Toma (ROU)	130 kg	Sarah Davies (GBR)	129 kg	Anastasiia Anzorova (RUS)	122 kg
–64 kg	Total	Loredana Toma (ROU)	244 kg	Sarah Davies (GBR)	230 kg	Anastasiia Anzorova (RUS)	222 kg
–71 kg	Snatch	Raluca Olaru (ROU)	98 kg	Emily Muskett (GBR)	98 kg	Alessia Durante (ITA)	97 kg
–71 kg	Clean & Jerk	Emily Muskett (GBR)	129 kg	Alessia Durante (ITA)	122 kg	Berfin Altun (TUR)	121 kg
–71 kg	Total	Emily Muskett (GBR)	227 kg	Alessia Durante (ITA)	219 kg	Raluca Olaru (ROU)	218 kg
–76 kg	Snatch	Iryna Dekha (UKR)	113 kg	Iana Sotieva (RUS)	112 kg	Anastasia Romanova (RUS)	111 kg
–76 kg	Clean & Jerk	Iryna Dekha (UKR)	135 kg	Iana Sotieva (RUS)	134 kg	Darya Naumava (BLR)	132 kg
–76 kg	Total	Iryna Dekha (UKR)	248 kg	Iana Sotieva (RUS)	246 kg	Anastasia Romanova (RUS)	243 kg
–81 kg	Snatch	Alina Marushchak (UKR)	109 kg	Nina Schroth (GER)	100 kg	Rabia Kaya (TUR)	100 kg
–81 kg	Clean & Jerk	Gaëlle Nayo-Ketchanke (FRA)	131 kg	Liana Gyurjyan (ARM)	129 kg	Alina Marushchak (UKR)	127 kg
–81 kg	Total	Alina Marushchak (UKR)	236 kg	Gaëlle Nayo-Ketchanke (FRA)	231 kg	Liana Gyurjyan (ARM)	227 kg
–87 kg	Snatch	Anastasiia Hotfrid (GEO)	111 kg	Daria Akhmerova (RUS)	108 kg	Elena Cîlcic (MDA)	107 kg
–87 kg	Clean & Jerk	Elena Cîlcic (MDA)	138 kg	Daria Akhmerova (RUS)	138 kg	Solfrid Koanda (NOR)	135 kg
–87 kg	Total	Daria Akhmerova (RUS)	246 kg	Elena Cîlcic (MDA)	245 kg	Daria Riazanova (RUS)	240 kg
+87 kg	Snatch	Emily Campbell (GBR)	122 kg	Anastasiya Lysenko (UKR)	116 kg	Melike Günal (TUR)	108 kg
+87 kg	Clean & Jerk	Emily Campbell (GBR)	154 kg	Anastasiya Lysenko (UKR)	136 kg	Melike Günal (TUR)	135 kg
+87 kg	Total	Emily Campbell (GBR)	276 kg	Anastasiya Lysenko (UKR)	252 kg	Melike Günal (TUR)	243 kg

== Team ranking ==
=== Men ===
Rank	Team	Points
1	Bulgaria	685
2	Armenia	620
3	Georgia	612
4	Russia	599
5	Belarus	560
6	Turkey	427
7	Spain	399
8	Poland	373
9	Ukraine	361
10	Czech Republic	353

=== Women ===
Rank	Team	Points
1	Russia	699
2	Turkey	616
3	Ukraine	600
4	Romania	491
5	Belarus	409
6	Poland	404
7	Denmark	349
8	Great Britain	298
9	Hungary	290
10	Spain	288

== Men's results ==
=== Men's 55 kg ===
Rank	Athlete	Group	Body weight	Snatch (kg)				Clean & Jerk (kg)				Total
Rank	Athlete	Group	Body weight	1	2	3	Rank	1	2	3	Rank	Total
1st place, gold medalist(s)	Angel Rusev (BUL)	A	54.88	~~105~~	105	111	3rd place, bronze medalist(s)	140	~~147~~	147	1st place, gold medalist(s)	258
2nd place, silver medalist(s)	Valentin Iancu (ROU)	A	54.98	100	105	108	5	130	135	140	2nd place, silver medalist(s)	248
3rd place, bronze medalist(s)	Dmytro Voronovskyi (UKR)	A	54.96	106	110	~~112~~	4	133	137	~~140~~	3rd place, bronze medalist(s)	247
4	Muammer Şahin (TUR)	A	54.88	~~109~~	109	112	2nd place, silver medalist(s)	~~130~~	~~130~~	130	5	242
5	Daniel Lungu (MDA)	A	54.94	108	~~111~~	113	1st place, gold medalist(s)	~~127~~	127	~~130~~	8	240
6	Cristian Luca (ROU)	A	54.74	103	107	~~111~~	6	130	~~134~~	~~136~~	4	237
7	Giorgi Dokvadze (GEO)	A	54.96	105	~~108~~	~~109~~	7	124	~~129~~	~~129~~	9	229
8	Muhammet Akkaya (TUR)	A	55.00	98	~~104~~	~~107~~	8	120	127	~~130~~	7	225
9	František Polák (CZE)	B	54.94	93	~~97~~	97	9	119	124	127	6	224

=== Men's 61 kg ===
Rank	Athlete	Group	Body weight	Snatch (kg)				Clean & Jerk (kg)				Total
Rank	Athlete	Group	Body weight	1	2	3	Rank	1	2	3	Rank	Total
1st place, gold medalist(s)	Stilyan Grozdev (BUL)	A	60.82	130	134	136	1st place, gold medalist(s)	~~156~~	157	160	2nd place, silver medalist(s)	296
2nd place, silver medalist(s)	Shota Mishvelidze (GEO)	A	61.00	~~129~~	131	135	2nd place, silver medalist(s)	155	~~159~~	~~162~~	5	290
3rd place, bronze medalist(s)	Ferdi Hardal (TUR)	A	60.92	130	~~135~~	~~135~~	4	157	~~161~~	~~161~~	4	287
4	Henadz Laptseu (BLR)	A	60.92	128	~~132~~	132	3rd place, bronze medalist(s)	148	154	~~159~~	8	286
5	Davide Ruiu (ITA)	A	60.80	~~125~~	125	~~130~~	7	150	~~158~~	158	3rd place, bronze medalist(s)	283
6	Jon Luke Mau (GER)	A	60.86	120	~~124~~	~~124~~	11	155	160	162	1st place, gold medalist(s)	282
7	Sergio Massidda (ITA)	A	60.86	125	~~130~~	~~130~~	6	145	155	~~160~~	6	280
8	Ramini Shamilishvili (GEO)	A	60.62	124	~~128~~	~~128~~	8	147	155	~~159~~	7	279
9	Caner Toptaş (TUR)	A	60.96	~~124~~	124	~~128~~	9	142	145	150	9	274
10	Simon Brandhuber (GER)	B	60.80	120	124	127	5	~~145~~	~~145~~	145	10	272
11	Josué Brachi (ESP)	B	59.72	115	118	121	10	~~138~~	138	141	11	262
12	Pavlo Zalipskyi (UKR)	B	60.02	117	~~121~~	~~123~~	12	135	140	~~146~~	12	257
13	Stefan Vladisavljev (SRB)	B	60.54	110	~~113~~	~~113~~	13	135	~~140~~	~~140~~	13	245
	Lewi Bar (ISR)	B	60.86	110	~~113~~	—	—	—	—	—	—	—

=== Men's 67 kg ===
Rank	Athlete	Group	Body weight	Snatch (kg)				Clean & Jerk (kg)				Total
Rank	Athlete	Group	Body weight	1	2	3	Rank	1	2	3	Rank	Total
1st place, gold medalist(s)	Muhammed Furkan Özbek (TUR)	A	66.96	139	142	145	3rd place, bronze medalist(s)	170	174	178	1st place, gold medalist(s)	323
2nd place, silver medalist(s)	Mirko Zanni (ITA)	A	66.74	142	146	148	1st place, gold medalist(s)	~~170~~	170	~~174~~	4	318
3rd place, bronze medalist(s)	Valentin Genchev (BUL)	A	66.72	132	136	138	7	168	173	177	2nd place, silver medalist(s)	315
4	Zulfat Garaev (RUS)	A	66.66	140	144	147	2nd place, silver medalist(s)	167	~~172~~	~~172~~	6	314
5	Goga Chkheidze (GEO)	A	66.82	134	138	140	4	165	170	~~175~~	3rd place, bronze medalist(s)	310
6	Bernardin Matam (FRA)	A	66.60	133	136	138	8	~~170~~	170	~~174~~	5	308
7	Petar Angelov (BUL)	A	66.92	130	135	138	6	157	162	~~169~~	9	300
8	Acorán Hernández (ESP)	A	66.56	130	134	139	5	155	160	~~164~~	10	299
9	Yusuf Genç (TUR)	A	66.76	125	130	~~132~~	11	~~166~~	167	~~173~~	7	297
10	Dzmitry Ivanou (BLR)	A	66.88	130	~~135~~	~~135~~	10	155	~~160~~	~~160~~	11	285
11	Victor Castro (ESP)	B	66.84	128	132	~~136~~	9	148	~~153~~	~~153~~	12	280
12	Kacper Urban (POL)	B	66.42	120	125	~~129~~	12	140	146	~~150~~	13	271
	Petr Petrov (CZE)	B	66.94	~~132~~	~~132~~	~~132~~	—	160	~~165~~	165	8	—

=== Men's 73 kg ===
Rank	Athlete	Group	Body weight	Snatch (kg)				Clean & Jerk (kg)				Total
Rank	Athlete	Group	Body weight	1	2	3	Rank	1	2	3	Rank	Total
1st place, gold medalist(s)	Daniyar İsmayilov (TUR)	A	72.72	155	158	160	1st place, gold medalist(s)	181	~~185~~	~~185~~	6	341
2nd place, silver medalist(s)	Marin Robu (MDA)	A	72.85	151	156	~~159~~	2nd place, silver medalist(s)	177	~~183~~	183	4	339
3rd place, bronze medalist(s)	Briken Calja (ALB)	A	72.94	152	~~157~~	~~157~~	4	~~183~~	184	~~188~~	2nd place, silver medalist(s)	336
4	Bozhidar Andreev (BUL)	A	72.84	152	~~156~~	~~157~~	3rd place, bronze medalist(s)	182	~~188~~	~~190~~	5	334
5	David Sánchez (ESP)	A	72.86	143	147	149	7	~~179~~	179	183	3rd place, bronze medalist(s)	332
6	Max Lang (GER)	A	72.62	~~145~~	~~145~~	145	9	175	180	185	1st place, gold medalist(s)	330
7	Kakhi Asanidze (GEO)	A	72.84	144	148	~~151~~	8	172	179	~~182~~	7	327
8	Ilya Zharnouski (BLR)	B	72.74	141	146	150	5	167	173	176	8	326
9	Sergey Petrov (RUS)	A	72.94	144	149	~~153~~	6	171	174	~~178~~	10	323
10	Piotr Kudłaszyk (POL)	A	72.72	138	142	~~145~~	11	174	~~179~~	~~182~~	9	316
11	Petr Stránský (CZE)	B	72.70	125	128	131	13	~~155~~	155	159	12	290
12	Vlads Prokofjevs (LAT)	B	72.64	123	~~126~~	128	14	154	~~159~~	159	13	287
13	Tim Kring (DEN)	B	72.94	~~127~~	~~127~~	127	15	155	~~160~~	~~160~~	14	282
14	Žilvinas Žilinskas (LTU)	B	72.96	118	122	126	16	146	147	155	15	281
15	Daniel Roness (NOR)	B	72.92	117	121	~~124~~	17	155	160	~~163~~	11	281
16	Einar Jónsson (ISL)	B	72.80	110	114	~~118~~	18	140	~~145~~	145	16	259
	Batu Yüksel (TUR)	A	72.76	144	~~148~~	~~148~~	10	~~172~~	~~172~~	~~172~~	—	—
	Alejandro González (ESP)	B	72.62	~~140~~	140	~~145~~	12	~~170~~	~~170~~	~~170~~	—	—

=== Men's 81 kg ===
Rank	Athlete	Group	Body weight	Snatch (kg)				Clean & Jerk (kg)				Total
Rank	Athlete	Group	Body weight	1	2	3	Rank	1	2	3	Rank	Total
1st place, gold medalist(s)	Antonino Pizzolato (ITA)	A	80.76	159	162	164	1st place, gold medalist(s)	195	200	206	2nd place, silver medalist(s)	370
2nd place, silver medalist(s)	Karlos Nasar (BUL)	A	80.84	158	~~162~~	163	2nd place, silver medalist(s)	194	200	206	1st place, gold medalist(s)	369
3rd place, bronze medalist(s)	Ritvars Suharevs (LAT)	A	80.38	157	~~162~~	~~163~~	5	190	~~193~~	~~195~~	5	347
4	Rafik Harutyunyan (ARM)	B	80.94	145	~~150~~	150	9	187	196	—	3rd place, bronze medalist(s)	346
5	Nico Müller (GER)	A	80.66	152	~~157~~	158	3rd place, bronze medalist(s)	~~188~~	~~188~~	188	7	346
6	Yunder Beytula (BUL)	A	80.72	150	~~153~~	~~153~~	10	185	196	~~198~~	4	346
7	Andrés Mata (ESP)	B	80.76	148	153	157	4	183	~~188~~	188	6	345
8	Viacheslav Iarkin (RUS)	A	80.56	156	~~159~~	~~159~~	7	184	~~191~~	~~192~~	8	340
9	Erkand Qerimaj (ALB)	B	80.88	150	154	156	6	180	~~184~~	~~185~~	10	336
10	Mikalai Charniak (BLR)	B	80.90	~~147~~	147	~~151~~	11	175	~~178~~	181	9	328
11	Alberto Fernández (ESP)	B	80.74	145	152	~~156~~	8	~~175~~	175	~~181~~	11	327
12	Patryk Bęben (POL)	B	80.98	140	~~145~~	~~145~~	12	~~170~~	170	~~180~~	13	310
13	Richard Tkáč (SVK)	B	80.78	130	134	137	14	165	170	~~174~~	12	307
14	Goran Ćetković (CRO)	B	79.48	110	117	123	15	135	142	~~147~~	15	265
15	Amos Ferrari (SUI)	B	79.60	~~112~~	~~112~~	112	16	140	144	~~148~~	14	256
	Máté Kmegy (HUN)	B	80.58	~~138~~	~~138~~	138	13	~~168~~	~~168~~	~~168~~	—	—
	Daniel Godelli (ALB)	A	80.98	~~152~~	~~152~~	—	—	—	—	—	—	—
	Celil Erdoğdu (TUR)	A	79.36	~~151~~	~~151~~	~~151~~	—	—	—	—	—	—
	Krzysztof Zwarycz (POL)	A	80.96	~~150~~	~~150~~	~~150~~	—	—	—	—	—	—

=== Men's 89 kg ===
Rank	Athlete	Group	Body weight	Snatch (kg)				Clean & Jerk (kg)				Total
Rank	Athlete	Group	Body weight	1	2	3	Rank	1	2	3	Rank	Total
1st place, gold medalist(s)	Karen Avagyan (ARM)	A	88.76	165	170	175	1st place, gold medalist(s)	200	~~204~~	~~204~~	2nd place, silver medalist(s)	375
2nd place, silver medalist(s)	Revaz Davitadze (GEO)	A	88.64	166	171	~~176~~	2nd place, silver medalist(s)	198	203	~~205~~	1st place, gold medalist(s)	374
3rd place, bronze medalist(s)	Andranik Karapetyan (ARM)	A	88.40	165	170	~~175~~	3rd place, bronze medalist(s)	195	~~200~~	~~205~~	6	365
4	Roman Chepik (RUS)	A	88.90	157	161	164	4	~~194~~	194	198	3rd place, bronze medalist(s)	362
5	Ruslan Kozhakin (UKR)	A	88.98	156	160	162	5	190	~~197~~	197	4	359
6	Siarhei Haranin (BLR)	A	88.94	~~155~~	155	~~160~~	9	192	194	196	5	351
7	Krenar Shoraj (ALB)	A	88.72	~~150~~	150	156	6	190	192	—	7	348
8	Theodoros Iakovidis (GRE)	A	88.46	~~153~~	153	156	7	~~187~~	187	191	8	347
9	Tudor Bratu (MDA)	B	88.26	150	155	~~158~~	8	185	190	~~191~~	9	345
10	Antonis Martasidis (CYP)	A	88.62	150	~~153~~	~~153~~	10	190	~~198~~	~~198~~	10	340
11	Armands Mežinskis (LAT)	B	88.58	~~148~~	148	~~154~~	11	187	~~193~~	~~194~~	11	335
12	Emmanouil Marianakis (GRE)	B	88.78	140	145	~~150~~	12	170	175	178	13	323
13	Peter Polaček (SVK)	B	88.48	~~134~~	135	139	13	168	173	177	14	316
14	Karol Samko (SVK)	B	88.78	135	~~139~~	~~140~~	14	180	~~185~~	~~185~~	12	315
15	Antti Peltokangas (FIN)	B	88.80	125	130	~~132~~	15	165	~~170~~	170	15	300
	Daniel Robertsson (ISL)	B	85.38	~~122~~	~~123~~	125	16	~~148~~	~~148~~	~~148~~	—	—
	Eero Retulainen (FIN)	B	88.86	—	—	—	—	—	—	—	—	—

=== Men's 96 kg ===
Rank	Athlete	Group	Body weight	Snatch (kg)				Clean & Jerk (kg)				Total
Rank	Athlete	Group	Body weight	1	2	3	Rank	1	2	3	Rank	Total
1st place, gold medalist(s)	Anton Pliesnoi (GEO)	A	95.86	171	175	180	1st place, gold medalist(s)	207	213	~~221~~	1st place, gold medalist(s)	393
2nd place, silver medalist(s)	Petr Asayonak (BLR)	A	93.66	167	~~172~~	172	2nd place, silver medalist(s)	202	~~207~~	~~207~~	5	374
3rd place, bronze medalist(s)	Hakob Mkrtchyan (ARM)	A	95.48	160	~~165~~	~~165~~	7	205	212	~~215~~	2nd place, silver medalist(s)	372
4	Bartłomiej Adamus (POL)	A	95.82	160	165	~~169~~	4	195	202	206	3rd place, bronze medalist(s)	371
5	Georgii Kuptsov (RUS)	A	95.98	~~165~~	~~165~~	165	6	197	203	~~207~~	4	368
6	Artur Babayan (RUS)	A	95.92	163	167	~~171~~	3rd place, bronze medalist(s)	192	~~198~~	~~198~~	7	359
7	Yevhenii Yantsevich (UKR)	A	95.66	160	~~164~~	~~164~~	8	~~187~~	187	~~193~~	9	347
8	Daniel Goljasz (POL)	B	95.24	147	151	154	9	187	192	~~196~~	6	346
9	Jesse Nykänen (FIN)	B	95.92	148	~~152~~	152	11	177	181	~~185~~	10	333
10	Vadims Koževņikovs (LAT)	B	94.94	145	~~150~~	~~150~~	13	~~187~~	187	~~195~~	8	332
11	Josef Kolář (CZE)	B	95.32	147	~~151~~	~~152~~	12	180	~~187~~	~~187~~	12	327
12	Yannik Tschan (SUI)	B	95.24	137	140	143	14	176	180	~~184~~	13	323
13	Valentin Gnessin (ISR)	B	93.52	~~140~~	140	~~144~~	16	180	~~185~~	~~185~~	11	320
14	Amar Musić (CRO)	B	89.34	135	140	~~145~~	15	165	175	~~179~~	14	315
	Davit Hovhannisyan (ARM)	A	93.26	~~165~~	165	~~170~~	5	~~195~~	~~195~~	~~195~~	—	—
	Jürgen Spieß (GER)	A	95.66	153	~~158~~	~~160~~	10	~~190~~	~~192~~	~~196~~	—	—

=== Men's 102 kg ===
Rank	Athlete	Group	Body weight	Snatch (kg)				Clean & Jerk (kg)				Total
Rank	Athlete	Group	Body weight	1	2	3	Rank	1	2	3	Rank	Total
1st place, gold medalist(s)	Samvel Gasparyan (ARM)	A	101.70	171	176	~~178~~	2nd place, silver medalist(s)	209	214	—	1st place, gold medalist(s)	390
2nd place, silver medalist(s)	Arsen Martirosyan (ARM)	A	101.32	165	171	~~175~~	4	205	209	~~212~~	3rd place, bronze medalist(s)	380
3rd place, bronze medalist(s)	Dadash Dadashbayli (AZE)	A	101.56	170	174	177	1st place, gold medalist(s)	202	~~207~~	~~210~~	7	379
4	David Fischerov (BUL)	A	101.54	160	165	168	6	205	210	~~213~~	2nd place, silver medalist(s)	378
5	Irakli Chkheidze (GEO)	A	101.78	162	167	171	5	205	~~210~~	~~210~~	5	376
6	Vasil Marinov (BUL)	A	101.56	167	~~172~~	~~173~~	7	200	~~208~~	208	4	375
7	Siarhei Sharankou (BLR)	A	101.42	168	172	~~175~~	3rd place, bronze medalist(s)	202	~~206~~	~~206~~	6	374
8	Andrei Arlionak (BLR)	B	101.80	165	~~169~~	~~169~~	8	190	197	201	8	366
9	Fedor Petrov (RUS)	A	101.50	160	~~165~~	165	9	201	~~206~~	~~206~~	9	366
10	Artur Mugurdumov (ISR)	B	100.30	~~150~~	150	155	11	~~188~~	190	200	10	355
11	Patrik Krywult (CZE)	B	101.44	150	155	~~158~~	10	~~180~~	180	~~185~~	12	335
12	Jacob Diakovasilis (DEN)	B	101.62	~~138~~	~~138~~	140	14	175	~~181~~	181	11	321
13	Alish Nazarov (AZE)	B	99.10	135	~~140~~	141	12	160	167	174	13	315
14	Artiom Gritenco (MDA)	B	101.46	~~140~~	140	~~145~~	13	168	~~176~~	~~176~~	15	308
15	Viktor Ostrovsky (SVK)	B	96.12	135	~~140~~	~~141~~	15	170	~~174~~	~~174~~	14	305

=== Men's 109 kg ===
Rank	Athlete	Group	Body weight	Snatch (kg)				Clean & Jerk (kg)				Total
Rank	Athlete	Group	Body weight	1	2	3	Rank	1	2	3	Rank	Total
1st place, gold medalist(s)	Dmytro Chumak (UKR)	A	107.56	~~181~~	~~181~~	181	4	220	~~226~~	226	1st place, gold medalist(s)	407
2nd place, silver medalist(s)	Hristo Hristov (BUL)	A	108.78	181	186	~~190~~	2nd place, silver medalist(s)	214	~~220~~	220	4	406
3rd place, bronze medalist(s)	Timur Naniev (RUS)	A	108.96	180	184	~~186~~	3rd place, bronze medalist(s)	213	217	~~223~~	7	401
4	Marcos Ruiz (ESP)	A	108.58	175	~~180~~	180	5	210	215	220	3rd place, bronze medalist(s)	400
5	Arkadiusz Michalski (POL)	A	108.92	171	174	177	6	219	~~225~~	~~226~~	5	396
6	Artūrs Plēsnieks (LAT)	A	108.50	170	175	~~180~~	9	213	219	~~223~~	6	394
7	Arsen Kasabijew (POL)	A	106.00	165	170	~~173~~	11	205	212	220	2nd place, silver medalist(s)	390
8	Khas Balaev (RUS)	A	108.22	170	175	~~177~~	8	206	~~211~~	~~211~~	8	381
9	Sargis Martirosjan (AUT)	B	108.58	170	~~175~~	175	7	~~190~~	~~190~~	190	12	365
10	Arnas Šidiškis (LTU)	B	108.82	155	160	~~165~~	12	190	~~194~~	194	11	354
11	Radoslav Tatarčík (SVK)	B	108.60	165	~~170~~	170	10	177	~~183~~	183	13	353
12	Hannes Keskitalo (FIN)	B	108.78	145	150	~~153~~	14	190	200	—	9	350
13	Jiří Gasior (CZE)	B	107.74	~~148~~	148	151	13	188	194	~~200~~	10	347
	Simon Martirosyan (ARM)	A	108.70	~~190~~	~~190~~	190	1st place, gold medalist(s)	~~227~~	~~227~~	~~227~~	—	—

=== Men's +109 kg ===
Rank	Athlete	Group	Body weight	Snatch (kg)				Clean & Jerk (kg)				Total
Rank	Athlete	Group	Body weight	1	2	3	Rank	1	2	3	Rank	Total
1st place, gold medalist(s)	Lasha Talakhadze (GEO)	A	176.30	211	217	222	1st place, gold medalist(s)	245	253	263	1st place, gold medalist(s)	485
2nd place, silver medalist(s)	Gor Minasyan (ARM)	A	150.14	205	212	216	2nd place, silver medalist(s)	240	248	~~252~~	2nd place, silver medalist(s)	464
3rd place, bronze medalist(s)	Varazdat Lalayan (ARM)	A	147.68	200	205	~~209~~	3rd place, bronze medalist(s)	240	~~250~~	~~250~~	3rd place, bronze medalist(s)	445
4	Eduard Ziaziulin (BLR)	A	138.74	197	~~202~~	~~202~~	4	227	~~233~~	~~233~~	7	424
5	Antoniy Savchuk (RUS)	A	139.56	180	185	190	5	215	221	228	6	418
6	Kamil Kučera (CZE)	A	159.10	~~177~~	177	182	9	227	233	~~237~~	4	415
7	Oleksii Bibik (UKR)	B	123.70	180	185	189	6	210	221	—	10	410
8	Péter Nagy (HUN)	A	158.68	~~176~~	176	182	8	216	222	~~229~~	8	404
9	Jiří Orság (CZE)	A	141.30	~~170~~	170	~~175~~	14	225	232	~~237~~	5	402
10	David Litvinov (ISR)	B	129.82	177	184	188	7	207	213	~~218~~	12	401
11	Enzo Kuworge (NED)	A	158.50	172	176	~~180~~	10	~~222~~	~~222~~	222	9	398
12	Tamaš Kajdoči (SRB)	B	143.26	162	168	172	11	207	215	218	11	390
13	Yıldıray Kaplan (TUR)	B	135.00	165	170	~~175~~	12	200	~~210~~	211	13	381
14	Andrei Aramnau (BLR)	B	119.68	160	~~170~~	170	13	195	205	—	14	375
15	Kim Eirik Tollefsen (NOR)	B	122.12	155	~~160~~	160	15	195	201	~~206~~	15	361
16	Hampus Lithén (SWE)	B	143.46	152	156	~~159~~	16	195	~~205~~	~~207~~	16	351
17	Tivadar Kajdocsi (SRB)	B	124.77	142	~~148~~	~~148~~	18	180	~~190~~	190	17	332
18	Petri Lindfors (FIN)	B	123.60	140	144	~~148~~	17	175	~~180~~	~~180~~	18	319
	Irakli Turmanidze (GEO)	A	141.78	~~191~~	~~191~~	~~191~~	—	—	—	—	—	—
	Teemu Roininen (FIN)	B	117.26	did not start								

== Women's results ==
=== Women's 45 kg ===
Rank	Athlete	Group	Body weight	Snatch (kg)				Clean & Jerk (kg)				Total
Rank	Athlete	Group	Body weight	1	2	3	Rank	1	2	3	Rank	Total
1st place, gold medalist(s)	Nadezhda Nguen (BUL)	A	44.90	67	70	72	1st place, gold medalist(s)	~~83~~	83	~~85~~	4	155
2nd place, silver medalist(s)	Ivana Petrova (BUL)	A	44.72	65	67	~~69~~	4	~~85~~	85	~~89~~	1st place, gold medalist(s)	152
3rd place, bronze medalist(s)	Melisa Güneş (TUR)	A	44.66	~~63~~	63	68	2nd place, silver medalist(s)	80	83	~~85~~	3rd place, bronze medalist(s)	151
4	Cosmina Pana (ROU)	A	44.70	63	66	~~69~~	5	80	~~84~~	84	2nd place, silver medalist(s)	150
5	Anhelina Lomachynska (UKR)	A	44.70	67	~~69~~	~~69~~	3rd place, bronze medalist(s)	~~82~~	82	~~85~~	5	149
6	Bianca Dumitrescu (ROU)	A	44.40	~~63~~	64	~~68~~	6	~~78~~	~~78~~	78	7	142
7	Radmila Zagorac (SRB)	A	44.80	63	~~66~~	~~68~~	7	~~75~~	75	~~78~~	8	138
8	Ecaterina Grabucea (MDA)	B	44.50	52	54	56	8	66	69	72	9	128
	Tihana Majer (CRO)	A	44.84	~~63~~	~~63~~	~~63~~	—	78	~~81~~	81	6	—

=== Women's 49 kg ===
Rank	Athlete	Group	Body weight	Snatch (kg)				Clean & Jerk (kg)				Total
Rank	Athlete	Group	Body weight	1	2	3	Rank	1	2	3	Rank	Total
1st place, gold medalist(s)	Monica Csengeri (ROU)	A	48.78	86	~~90~~	~~90~~	1st place, gold medalist(s)	97	100	103	1st place, gold medalist(s)	189
2nd place, silver medalist(s)	Kristina Sobol (RUS)	A	48.80	83	85	~~87~~	2nd place, silver medalist(s)	~~93~~	93	96	5	181
3rd place, bronze medalist(s)	Mihaela Cambei (ROU)	A	48.24	80	~~84~~	~~84~~	4	96	100	~~102~~	2nd place, silver medalist(s)	180
4	Giulia Imperio (ITA)	A	48.88	76	81	~~84~~	3rd place, bronze medalist(s)	94	97	~~100~~	4	178
5	Şaziye Erdoğan (TUR)	A	48.82	78	~~80~~	~~82~~	5	97	~~99~~	~~101~~	3rd place, bronze medalist(s)	175
6	Anaïs Michel (FRA)	A	48.58	~~75~~	75	77	6	95	~~97~~	~~97~~	6	172
7	Sandra Jensen (DEN)	A	48.70	72	74	76	7	86	89	91	8	167
8	Olga Fernández (ESP)	A	48.90	70	73	~~75~~	10	90	94	~~96~~	7	167
9	Nida Karasakal (TUR)	A	48.56	74	~~77~~	~~77~~	8	~~90~~	90	~~95~~	9	164
10	Tenishia Thornton (MLT)	B	48.52	68	~~70~~	70	12	85	87	89	11	159
11	Marlena Polakowska (POL)	A	48.46	72	74	~~76~~	9	84	~~86~~	~~86~~	13	158
12	Maria Pipiliaridou (GRE)	B	48.50	~~68~~	68	~~71~~	13	~~89~~	89	~~91~~	10	157
13	Teodora Luminița Hincu (MDA)	B	48.82	68	71	~~72~~	11	~~84~~	84	~~87~~	12	155

=== Women's 55 kg ===
Rank	Athlete	Group	Body weight	Snatch (kg)				Clean & Jerk (kg)				Total
Rank	Athlete	Group	Body weight	1	2	3	Rank	1	2	3	Rank	Total
1st place, gold medalist(s)	Kamila Konotop (UKR)	A	54.98	90	93	95	1st place, gold medalist(s)	108	111	113	1st place, gold medalist(s)	208
2nd place, silver medalist(s)	Svetlana Ershova (RUS)	A	54.96	~~85~~	85	88	4	105	110	112	2nd place, silver medalist(s)	200
3rd place, bronze medalist(s)	Nina Sterckx (BEL)	A	54.14	~~87~~	~~87~~	88	5	103	~~108~~	109	4	197
4	Izabella Yaylyan (ARM)	A	54.74	85	90	~~92~~	2nd place, silver medalist(s)	105	~~110~~	~~110~~	7	195
5	Evagjelia Veli (ALB)	A	54.26	87	~~89~~	89	3rd place, bronze medalist(s)	105	~~108~~	~~108~~	8	194
6	Sümeyye Kentli (TUR)	A	54.74	80	~~83~~	83	12	107	110	~~113~~	3rd place, bronze medalist(s)	193
7	Joanna Łochowska (POL)	A	54.92	81	~~84~~	84	8	102	106	~~108~~	6	190
8	Andreea Cotruţa (ROU)	B	53.90	83	~~87~~	87	6	102	~~106~~	~~106~~	11	189
9	Maya Ivanova (BUL)	B	54.52	81	~~84~~	~~84~~	13	100	104	106	5	187
10	Sarah Øvsthus (NOR)	A	54.08	~~83~~	83	~~85~~	11	103	~~106~~	~~106~~	10	186
11	Atenery Hernández (ESP)	B	54.86	80	83	~~85~~	9	98	~~101~~	101	13	184
12	Garance Rigaud (FRA)	B	54.44	79	~~82~~	~~83~~	14	99	101	~~103~~	12	180
13	Svitlana Samuliak (UKR)	B	54.54	80	~~83~~	83	10	92	96	~~99~~	15	179
14	Laura Liukkonen (FIN)	C	54.96	72	75	~~77~~	15	93	97	~~100~~	14	172
15	Annelien Vandenabeele (BEL)	C	54.72	72	~~75~~	75	16	89	92	94	16	169
16	Aksana Zalatarova (ISR)	C	54.86	70	~~73~~	~~73~~	17	80	83	~~85~~	18	153
17	Chiara Bruno (SUI)	C	54.50	65	~~69~~	~~69~~	18	~~80~~	80	84	17	149
	Katrine Bruhn (DEN)	B	54.10	~~78~~	~~78~~	~~79~~	—	99	103	~~105~~	9	—
	Leonora Brajshori (KOS)	C	54.84	~~65~~	—	—	—	65	68	~~70~~	19	—
	Jennifer Lombardo (ITA)	A	54.62	85	~~88~~	—	7	—	—	—	—	—
	Rebekka Jacobsen (NOR)	B	54.88	~~77~~	~~77~~	~~77~~	—	—	—	—	—	—

=== Women's 59 kg ===
Rank	Athlete	Group	Body weight	Snatch (kg)				Clean & Jerk (kg)				Total
Rank	Athlete	Group	Body weight	1	2	3	Rank	1	2	3	Rank	Total
(gold)	Olga Te (RUS)	A	58.74	95	~~98~~	~~98~~	1st place, gold medalist(s)	~~110~~	110	115	1st place, gold medalist(s)	210
2nd place, silver medalist(s)	Dora Tchakounté (FRA)	A	58.66	92	95	~~97~~	2nd place, silver medalist(s)	110	~~115~~	115	2nd place, silver medalist(s)	210
3rd place, bronze medalist(s)	Aleksandra Kozlova (RUS)	A	58.82	87	91	~~93~~	3rd place, bronze medalist(s)	105	111	~~115~~	4	202
4	Ine Andersson (NOR)	A	58.24	~~86~~	86	88	8	110	113	~~116~~	3rd place, bronze medalist(s)	201
5	Zoe Smith (GBR)	A	58.80	87	~~89~~	89	7	~~111~~	111	~~114~~	5	200
6	Saara Retulainen (FIN)	A	58.58	87	90	~~92~~	5	108	~~110~~	~~111~~	7	198
7	Mariia Hanhur (UKR)	A	58.40	89	~~93~~	~~93~~	6	108	~~113~~	~~113~~	8	197
8	Irene Martínez (ESP)	B	58.68	90	~~92~~	~~92~~	4	100	103	~~105~~	13	193
9	Þuríður Erla Helgadóttir (ISL)	B	58.22	80	83	~~85~~	11	100	104	108	6	191
10	Sanne Bijleveld (NED)	B	58.46	82	85	~~87~~	9	105	~~109~~	~~110~~	11	190
11	Sol Anette Waaler (NOR)	B	58.64	83	85	~~87~~	10	103	105	~~107~~	12	190
12	Mouna Skandi (ESP)	B	59.00	~~79~~	79	82	12	103	106	~~108~~	10	188
13	Monika Szymanek (POL)	B	58.66	~~78~~	78	~~81~~	15	102	106	~~110~~	9	184
14	Amalie Løvind Årsten (DEN)	B	58.30	78	~~81~~	~~81~~	13	98	101	~~104~~	14	179
15	Nathalie Lebbe (BEL)	B	58.76	75	78	~~81~~	14	95	~~99~~	100	16	178
16	Cintia Árva (HUN)	B	58.20	68	~~71~~	~~71~~	17	91	94	~~96~~	17	162
17	Ivana Gorišek (CRO)	B	58.64	69	73	~~76~~	16	85	~~88~~	~~88~~	18	158
	Scheila Meister (SUI)	B	57.90	~~77~~	~~78~~	~~78~~	—	95	100	~~103~~	15	—
	Konstantina Benteli (GRE)	A	did not start									
DSQ	Boyanka Kostova (AZE)	A	58.74	92	95	~~97~~	—	111	~~116~~	116	—	—

=== Women's 64 kg ===
Rank	Athlete	Group	Body weight	Snatch (kg)				Clean & Jerk (kg)				Total
Rank	Athlete	Group	Body weight	1	2	3	Rank	1	2	3	Rank	Total
1st place, gold medalist(s)	Loredana Toma (ROU)	A	63.90	101	107	114	1st place, gold medalist(s)	123	130	~~137~~	1st place, gold medalist(s)	244
2nd place, silver medalist(s)	Sarah Davies (GBR)	A	63.70	96	98	101	2nd place, silver medalist(s)	122	126	129	2nd place, silver medalist(s)	230
3rd place, bronze medalist(s)	Anastasiia Anzorova (RUS)	A	63.94	94	97	100	3rd place, bronze medalist(s)	117	122	~~128~~	3rd place, bronze medalist(s)	222
4	Lisa Schweizer (GER)	A	63.38	~~97~~	97	100	4	118	~~121~~	~~121~~	4	218
5	Nuray Levent (TUR)	A	63.80	94	~~97~~	98	5	~~115~~	115	~~120~~	7	213
6	Anni Vuohijoki (FIN)	A	63.74	94	~~96~~	~~96~~	8	115	118	~~120~~	5	212
7	Sabine Kusterer (GER)	A	63.30	~~94~~	94	~~97~~	9	113	116	~~118~~	6	210
8	Iana Kondrashova (RUS)	A	63.40	93	~~96~~	96	6	113	~~118~~	~~118~~	8	209
9	Daniela Gherman (SWE)	A	63.14	~~95~~	95	~~98~~	7	110	~~115~~	~~115~~	10	205
10	Wiktoria Wołk (POL)	B	63.28	85	89	~~93~~	11	105	~~110~~	110	9	199
11	Marit Årdalsbakke (NOR)	B	63.66	87	90	93	10	~~105~~	105	~~108~~	12	198
12	Jenny Adolfsson (SWE)	B	63.88	82	85	87	12	103	~~108~~	108	11	195
13	Amanda Poulsen (DEN)	B	62.24	~~83~~	83	~~87~~	13	~~102~~	102	105	13	188
14	Garoa Martínez (ESP)	B	63.28	78	82	~~87~~	14	100	~~105~~	~~105~~	14	182
15	Eliška Pudivítrová (CZE)	B	62.74	76	~~79~~	81	15	96	100	~~103~~	15	181
16	Marianne Saarhelo (FIN)	B	63.94	~~78~~	78	81	16	98	~~102~~	~~103~~	17	179
17	Amalía Ósk Sigurðardóttir (ISL)	B	62.70	74	~~78~~	79	18	~~98~~	~~99~~	100	16	179
18	Aleksandra Prokić (SRB)	B	62.28	76	80	~~83~~	17	96	~~100~~	~~100~~	18	176
19	Sarit Kalo (ISR)	B	63.54	~~75~~	75	~~79~~	19	95	~~99~~	~~99~~	19	170

=== Women's 71 kg ===
Rank	Athlete	Group	Body weight	Snatch (kg)				Clean & Jerk (kg)				Total
Rank	Athlete	Group	Body weight	1	2	3	Rank	1	2	3	Rank	Total
1st place, gold medalist(s)	Emily Muskett (GBR)	A	70.42	94	~~97~~	98	2nd place, silver medalist(s)	122	129	~~132~~	1st place, gold medalist(s)	227
2nd place, silver medalist(s)	Alessia Durante (ITA)	A	66.54	93	96	97	3rd place, bronze medalist(s)	115	120	122	2nd place, silver medalist(s)	219
3rd place, bronze medalist(s)	Raluca Olaru (ROU)	A	66.50	94	~~97~~	98	1st place, gold medalist(s)	112	117	120	4	218
4	Ilia Hernández (ESP)	A	70.60	90	~~93~~	93	6	116	~~119~~	119	5	212
5	Gintarė Bražaitė (LTU)	A	70.12	92	~~94~~	~~95~~	7	110	115	118	6	210
6	Berfin Altun (TUR)	A	65.38	85	88	~~90~~	17	115	119	121	3rd place, bronze medalist(s)	209
7	Natalia Prișcepa (MDA)	A	70.72	~~92~~	~~92~~	92	8	110	114	~~117~~	9	206
8	Alina Shchapanava (BLR)	B	70.96	85	89	91	9	107	112	114	8	205
9	Veronika Mitykó (HUN)	B	70.36	~~90~~	90	96	4	103	106	~~108~~	19	202
10	Manon Angonese (BEL)	B	69.66	86	89	~~91~~	12	107	110	112	11	201
11	Andżelika Kaczmarczyk (POL)	B	70.36	~~85~~	85	88	16	110	113	~~116~~	10	201
12	Eleni Kourtelidou (GRE)	B	70.78	86	~~90~~	~~90~~	19	109	112	115	7	201
13	Liubou Dzemidavets (BLR)	B	68.66	85	89	~~91~~	11	105	108	111	13	200
14	Ivana Horná (SVK)	B	69.54	86	89	91	10	~~107~~	108	~~112~~	15	199
15	Laura Tolstrup (DEN)	C	70.20	82	85	~~88~~	22	105	~~109~~	111	12	196
16	Anna Fomina (SWE)	A	67.82	86	87	~~95~~	18	109	~~115~~	~~116~~	14	196
17	Line Gude (DEN)	C	69.70	82	85	88	13	102	~~106~~	107	16	195
18	Lijana Jakaitė (LTU)	C	68.74	83	86	88	14	103	106	~~108~~	17	194
19	Victoria Hahn (AUT)	B	70.56	86	~~89~~	~~90~~	20	~~105~~	105	~~109~~	20	191
20	Nina Rondziková (SVK)	B	70.52	~~85~~	85	~~89~~	21	103	106	~~109~~	18	191
21	Yasmin Stevens (MLT)	C	69.74	83	86	88	15	~~102~~	102	~~104~~	23	190
22	Yevheniia Rosinska (UKR)	B	65.22	83	~~86~~	~~86~~	24	104	~~107~~	~~109~~	21	187
23	Simona Hertlová (CZE)	B	70.88	82	~~86~~	~~86~~	25	100	104	~~107~~	22	186
24	Marina Ohman (ISR)	C	70.94	81	84	~~87~~	23	95	100	~~102~~	25	184
25	Sonja Bjelić (SRB)	C	69.78	80	~~85~~	~~86~~	26	100	~~105~~	~~105~~	24	180
	Maria Kireva (BUL)	A	70.70	92	95	~~97~~	5	~~108~~	~~108~~	—	—	—

=== Women's 76 kg ===
Rank	Athlete	Group	Body weight	Snatch (kg)				Clean & Jerk (kg)				Total
Rank	Athlete	Group	Body weight	1	2	3	Rank	1	2	3	Rank	Total
1st place, gold medalist(s)	Iryna Dekha (UKR)	A	75.94	110	113	~~115~~	1st place, gold medalist(s)	130	~~135~~	135	1st place, gold medalist(s)	248
2nd place, silver medalist(s)	Iana Sotieva (RUS)	A	75.78	105	110	112	2nd place, silver medalist(s)	130	134	~~137~~	2nd place, silver medalist(s)	246
3rd place, bronze medalist(s)	Anastasia Romanova (RUS)	A	72.06	106	111	~~114~~	3rd place, bronze medalist(s)	125	130	132	4	243
4	Darya Naumava (BLR)	A	75.44	100	106	108	4	127	132	~~136~~	3rd place, bronze medalist(s)	240
5	Patricia Strenius (SWE)	A	74.68	100	104	~~107~~	5	130	~~135~~	~~135~~	5	234
6	Ryna Litoshyk (BLR)	A	75.46	90	~~95~~	95	8	110	117	121	6	216
7	Jolanta Wiór (POL)	A	73.98	94	97	99	6	116	~~121~~	~~122~~	8	215
8	Patricia Rieger (GER)	A	75.74	95	~~100~~	~~100~~	7	116	120	~~123~~	7	215
9	Laura Horváth (HUN)	B	75.34	86	89	~~91~~	10	108	~~111~~	111	9	200
10	Clara Andreasen (DEN)	B	75.76	87	90	~~93~~	9	103	105	~~107~~	10	195
11	Mette Pedersen (DEN)	B	73.82	80	83	~~86~~	11	98	101	~~103~~	11	184
	Lydia Valentín (ESP)	A	did not start									

=== Women's 81 kg ===
Rank	Athlete	Group	Body weight	Snatch (kg)				Clean & Jerk (kg)				Total
Rank	Athlete	Group	Body weight	1	2	3	Rank	1	2	3	Rank	Total
1st place, gold medalist(s)	Alina Marushchak (UKR)	A	77.62	103	106	109	1st place, gold medalist(s)	122	127	~~131~~	3rd place, bronze medalist(s)	236
2nd place, silver medalist(s)	Gaëlle Nayo-Ketchanke (FRA)	A	80.30	96	~~100~~	100	4	126	~~131~~	131	1st place, gold medalist(s)	231
3rd place, bronze medalist(s)	Liana Gyurjyan (ARM)	A	80.26	94	98	~~100~~	6	121	125	129	2nd place, silver medalist(s)	227
4	Rabia Kaya (TUR)	A	77.90	~~96~~	96	100	3rd place, bronze medalist(s)	115	~~120~~	120	6	220
5	Nina Schroth (GER)	A	80.52	97	100	~~102~~	2nd place, silver medalist(s)	115	118	~~121~~	7	218
6	Dilara Uçan (TUR)	A	76.34	95	97	~~99~~	7	116	121	~~124~~	4	217
7	Weronika Zielińska (POL)	A	79.16	95	~~99~~	~~99~~	8	~~118~~	~~118~~	121	5	216
8	Dzina Sazanavets (BLR)	A	78.50	95	99	~~101~~	5	116	~~121~~	~~121~~	8	215
9	Nicole Rubanovich (ISR)	A	78.90	~~95~~	95	~~100~~	9	110	115	~~119~~	9	210
10	Nikola Seničová (SVK)	B	80.14	86	90	93	10	~~108~~	109	114	10	207
11	Tímea Szuromi (HUN)	B	80.64	~~92~~	92	~~96~~	11	110	~~116~~	~~116~~	14	202
12	Natia Gadelia (GEO)	B	78.90	85	89	91	12	105	111	~~115~~	13	202
13	Dziana Minkova (BLR)	B	79.58	85	~~89~~	89	13	112	~~117~~	~~117~~	11	201
14	Michaela Skleničková (CZE)	B	78.14	~~82~~	82	86	14	108	112	~~115~~	12	198

=== Women's 87 kg ===
Rank	Athlete	Group	Body weight	Snatch (kg)				Clean & Jerk (kg)				Total
Rank	Athlete	Group	Body weight	1	2	3	Rank	1	2	3	Rank	Total
1st place, gold medalist(s)	Daria Akhmerova (RUS)	A	85.02	103	106	108	2nd place, silver medalist(s)	132	136	138	2nd place, silver medalist(s)	246
2nd place, silver medalist(s)	Elena Cîlcic (MDA)	A	84.96	103	107	~~110~~	3rd place, bronze medalist(s)	129	134	138	1st place, gold medalist(s)	245
3rd place, bronze medalist(s)	Daria Riazanova (RUS)	A	85.88	100	~~105~~	105	4	128	133	135	4	240
4	Anastasiia Hotfrid (GEO)	A	86.54	108	111	~~113~~	1st place, gold medalist(s)	128	~~132~~	~~132~~	5	239
5	Solfrid Koanda (NOR)	A	86.36	95	100	~~104~~	8	125	130	135	3rd place, bronze medalist(s)	235
6	Kinga Kaczmarczyk (POL)	A	86.92	100	103	~~105~~	6	127	~~134~~	~~134~~	6	230
7	Sarah Fischer (AUT)	A	86.42	95	99	~~102~~	9	118	~~123~~	123	7	222
8	Valentyna Kisil (UKR)	A	86.62	100	104	~~108~~	5	117	~~122~~	122	11	221
9	Tatev Hakobyan (ARM)	A	86.70	101	~~106~~	~~106~~	7	120	~~126~~	~~129~~	9	221
10	Meri Ilmarinen (FIN)	B	81.20	90	92	94	12	117	120	121	8	215
11	Louise Vennekilde (DEN)	B	86.52	95	~~99~~	~~101~~	10	116	119	~~121~~	10	214
12	Paula Junhov Rindberg (SWE)	B	86.52	92	~~95~~	95	11	108	113	~~115~~	12	208
13	Ina Zakharchuk (BLR)	B	85.48	~~87~~	87	—	13	106	109	111	13	198
14	Viktória Boros (HUN)	B	83.50	~~85~~	85	~~90~~	14	107	~~111~~	~~111~~	14	192

=== Women's +87 kg ===
Rank	Athlete	Group	Body weight	Snatch (kg)				Clean & Jerk (kg)				Total
Rank	Athlete	Group	Body weight	1	2	3	Rank	1	2	3	Rank	Total
1st place, gold medalist(s)	Emily Campbell (GBR)	A	122.06	115	117	122	1st place, gold medalist(s)	145	150	154	1st place, gold medalist(s)	276
2nd place, silver medalist(s)	Anastasiya Lysenko (UKR)	A	100.88	106	109	116	2nd place, silver medalist(s)	131	136	—	2nd place, silver medalist(s)	252
3rd place, bronze medalist(s)	Melike Günal (TUR)	A	114.18	105	~~108~~	108	3rd place, bronze medalist(s)	130	~~135~~	135	3rd place, bronze medalist(s)	243
4	Arpine Dalalyan (ARM)	A	110.44	~~95~~	~~95~~	95	6	126	—	—	4	221
5	Tuğçe Boynueğri (TUR)	A	87.86	90	95	100	5	110	116	120	5	220
6	Martina Hrašnová (SVK)	A	90.56	~~99~~	99	103	4	112	116	~~120~~	6	219
7	Anna Van Bellinghen (BEL)	A	87.20	~~90~~	90	94	7	107	111	114	9	208
8	Krystyna Borodina (UKR)	A	88.84	~~85~~	85	88	9	110	113	116	7	204
9	Katsiaryna Andreikavets (BLR)	A	92.78	85	89	~~91~~	8	107	111	114	8	203
10	Bianka Bazsó (HUN)	B	88.12	83	~~87~~	~~87~~	10	109	113	~~115~~	10	196
11	Tereza Králová (CZE)	B	97.68	80	~~83~~	~~84~~	12	100	105	107	11	187
12	Barbara Gyürüs (HUN)	B	122.58	79	~~83~~	83	11	99	103	~~107~~	12	186

== Participating countries ==
A total of 315 competitors from 38 nations participated.

- Albania (5)
- Armenia (14)
- Austria (3)
- Azerbaijan (3)
- Belarus (18)
- Belgium (5)
- Bulgaria (14)
- Croatia (4)
- Cyprus (1)
- Czech Republic (12)
- Denmark (11)
- Finland (11)
- France (5)
- Georgia (12)
- Germany (9)
- Great Britain (4)
- Greece (5)
- Hungary (9)
- Iceland (4)
- Israel (8)
- Italy (7)
- Kosovo (1)
- Latvia (5)
- Lithuania (4)
- Malta (2)
- Moldova (8)
- Netherlands (2)
- Norway (8)
- Poland (16)
- Romania (9)
- Russia (20)
- Serbia (6)
- Slovakia (9)
- Spain (15)
- Sweden (6)
- Switzerland (4)
- Turkey (20)
- Ukraine (16)
