= 2021 World Weightlifting Championships – Men's 67 kg =

Weightlifting Championship

The men's 67 kilograms competition at the 2021 World Weightlifting Championships was held on 9 and 10 December 2021.

== Schedule ==
Date	Time	Event
9 December 2021	10:30	Group C
10 December 2021	13:00	Group B
10 December 2021	16:00	Group A

== Medalists ==
Event	Gold		Silver		Bronze	
Snatch	Zulfat Garaev (RWF)	146 kg	Doston Yokubov (UZB)	144 kg	Talha Talib (PAK)	143 kg
Clean & Jerk	Doston Yokubov (UZB)	180 kg	Francisco Mosquera (COL)	179 kg	Adkhamjon Ergashev (UZB)	174 kg
Total	Doston Yokubov (UZB)	324 kg	Francisco Mosquera (COL)	316 kg	Zulfat Garaev (RWF)	315 kg

== Records ==
Prior to this competition, the existing world records were as follows.

World record	Snatch	Huang Minhao (CHN)	155 kg	Tokyo, Japan	6 July 2019
World record	Clean & Jerk	Pak Jong-ju (PRK)	188 kg	Pattaya, Thailand	20 September 2019
World record	Total	Chen Lijun (CHN)	339 kg	Ningbo, China	21 April 2019

== Results ==
Rank	Athlete	Group	Snatch (kg)				Clean & Jerk (kg)				Total
Rank	Athlete	Group	1	2	3	Rank	1	2	3	Rank	Total
1st place, gold medalist(s)	Doston Yokubov (UZB)	A	140	~~143~~	144	2nd place, silver medalist(s)	172	176	180	1st place, gold medalist(s)	324
2nd place, silver medalist(s)	Francisco Mosquera (COL)	A	137	~~141~~	~~141~~	6	175	179	~~181~~	2nd place, silver medalist(s)	316
3rd place, bronze medalist(s)	Zulfat Garaev (RWF)	A	142	146	~~148~~	1st place, gold medalist(s)	165	~~169~~	169	7	315
4	Anucha Doungsri (THA)	A	136	138	~~140~~	5	170	174	~~178~~	4	312
5	Valentin Genchev (BUL)	A	132	135	~~137~~	10	168	173	~~176~~	5	308
6	Adkhamjon Ergashev (UZB)	A	134	~~139~~	~~140~~	11	168	174	~~177~~	3rd place, bronze medalist(s)	308
7	Jeremy Lalrinnunga (IND)	B	~~136~~	136	141	4	164	~~168~~	~~168~~	10	305
8	Jair Reyes (ECU)	B	130	~~134~~	~~134~~	14	164	168	172	6	302
9	Acorán Hernández (ESP)	A	136	~~140~~	~~140~~	7	160	164	~~167~~	12	300
10	Mohammad Yasin (INA)	B	~~130~~	130	135	9	160	164	~~167~~	11	299
11	Nawaf Al-Mazyadi (KSA)	B	127	131	~~135~~	12	160	~~165~~	165	9	296
12	Joseph Edidiong (NGR)	C	125	130	135	8	155	~~160~~	160	13	295
13	Triyatno (INA)	B	125	~~131~~	131	13	160	~~165~~	~~165~~	14	291
14	Yusuf Fehmi Genç (TUR)	B	125	~~128~~	~~130~~	16	~~160~~	160	165	8	290
15	Hu Jyun-siang (TPE)	B	118	123	~~126~~	17	~~160~~	~~160~~	160	15	283
16	Ishimbek Muratbek Uulu (KGZ)	B	114	118	121	20	153	158	~~163~~	16	279
17	Dave Pacaldo (PHI)	B	~~123~~	~~123~~	123	18	~~155~~	155	~~160~~	17	278
18	Petr Petrov (CZE)	B	122	~~126~~	~~126~~	19	150	154	~~157~~	18	276
19	Víctor Castro (ESP)	B	122	127	~~130~~	15	148	~~153~~	~~153~~	19	275
20	Elzar Taiirov (KGZ)	C	~~115~~	115	~~120~~	22	135	140	145	20	260
21	Manoj Wijesinghe (SRI)	C	~~110~~	110	113	23	138	141	~~145~~	21	254
22	Kamal Egodawatta (SRI)	C	112	115	~~117~~	21	~~138~~	138	~~140~~	22	253
23	Ibrahim Nsubuga (UGA)	C	~~85~~	85	~~93~~	24	~~110~~	110	115	23	200
—	Talha Talib (PAK)	A	143	~~146~~	~~147~~	3rd place, bronze medalist(s)	~~165~~	~~165~~	~~165~~	—	—
—	Luis Javier Mosquera (COL)	A	~~145~~	~~145~~	~~145~~	—	—	—	—	—	—
