= Juan Solís =

Colombian weightlifter (born 1999)

Personal information
- Nationality: Colombian
- Born: Juan Felipe Solís Arboleda; March 5, 1999 (age 27)
- Weight: 80.40 kg (177 lb)

Sport
- Country: Colombia
- Sport: Weightlifting
- Events: 81 kg; 96 kg
Medal record
Representing Colombia
Men's weightlifting
Pan American Championships
Bronze medal – third place	2019 Guatemala City	81 kg
Bolivarian Games
Gold medal – first place	2024 Ayacucho	96 kg
Junior World Championships
Silver medal – second place	2019 Suva	81 kg
Youth World Championships
Silver medal – second place	2016 Penang	85 kg

Juan Felipe Solís Arboleda (born 5 March 1999) is a Colombian weightlifter, competing in the 85 kg category until 2018 and 81 kg starting in 2018 after the International Weightlifting Federation reorganized the categories.

== Career ==
He competed at the 2019 Pan American Weightlifting Championships in the 81 kg division winning a bronze medal. Later in 2019 he competed at the 2019 Junior World Weightlifting Championships winning a silver medal in the snatch, gold medal in the clean & jerk and silver in the total, finishing 1 kg behind gold medalist Ritvars Suharevs.

In February 2020, he was provisionally suspended after testing positive for the anabolic steroid boldenone. In December 2020, the International Weightlifting Federation confirmed his four-year ban from the sport.
