= Hristo Hristov =

Bulgarian weightlifter (born 2001)

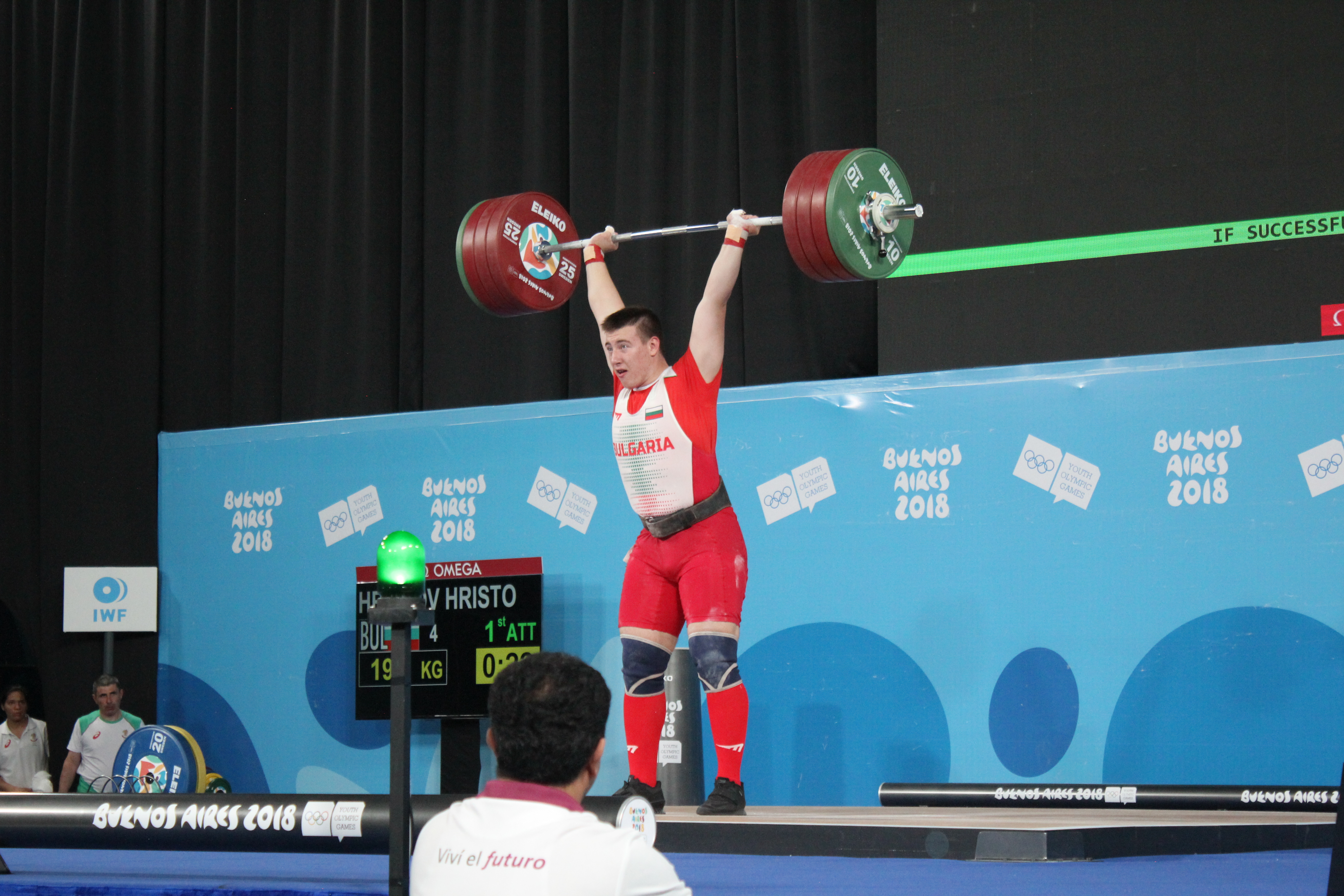
- Hristov at the 2018 Summer Youth Olympics

Personal information
- Full name: Hristo Dimitrov Hristov
- Nationality: Bulgarian
- Born: 27 April 2001 (age 25) Varna, Bulgaria
- Weight: 109.00 kg (240 lb)

Sport
- Country: Bulgaria
- Sport: Weightlifting
- Weight class: 109 kg
- Club: Titan Varna
- Coached by: Ivan Ivanov; Zhivko Nikolov
Medal record
Men's weightlifting
Representing Bulgaria
European Championships
Gold medal – first place	2022 Tirana	–109 kg
Silver medal – second place	2021 Moscow	–109 kg
Silver medal – second place	2024 Sofia	–109 kg
Bronze medal – third place	2026 Batumi	–110 kg
Youth Olympic Games
Silver medal – second place	2018 Buenos Aires	+85 kg
World Junior Championships
Gold medal – first place	2021 Tashkent	–109 kg
World Youth Championships
Gold medal – first place	2017 Bangkok	–94 kg
European Youth Championships
Gold medal – first place	2017 Pristina	–94 kg
Gold medal – first place	2018 San Donato Milanese	–94 kg
European Junior & U23 Weightlifting Championships
Gold medal – first place	2019 Bucharest	–109 kg

Hristo Hristov (Bulgarian: Христо Христов; born 27 April 2001) is a Bulgarian weightlifter.

== Career ==
=== Olympics ===
In 2021 he competed at the 2020 Summer Olympics in the 109 kg category. He could have won a bronze medal, but referees rejected his successful last attempt on 222 kg clean and jerk.

== Major results ==
Year	Venue	Weight	Snatch (kg)				Clean & Jerk (kg)				Total	Rank
Year	Venue	Weight	1	2	3	Rank	1	2	3	Rank	Total	Rank
Olympic Games
2020	Tokyo, Japan	109 kg	185	189	~~192~~	—N/a	213	219	~~222~~	—N/a	408	5
World Championships
2021	Tashkent, Uzbekistan	109 kg	170	176	178	5	200	206	210	6	388	4
2023	Riyadh, Saudi Arabia	109 kg	176	181	~~184~~	2nd place, silver medalist(s)	205	211	~~215~~	8	392	4
European Championships
2021	Moscow, Russia	109 kg	181	186 EJR	~~190~~	2nd place, silver medalist(s)	214	~~220~~	220 EJR	4	406 EJR	2nd place, silver medalist(s)
2022	Tirana, Albania	109 kg	175	180	~~182~~	1st place, gold medalist(s)	~~206~~	206	211	1st place, gold medalist(s)	391	1st place, gold medalist(s)
2024	Sofia, Bulgaria	109 kg	170	173	175	2nd place, silver medalist(s)	202	205	~~208~~	4	380	2nd place, silver medalist(s)
2025	Chișinău, Moldova	+109 kg	170	176	178	6	205	~~212~~	~~214~~	9	383	6
2026	Batumi, Georgia	110 kg	184	190	~~196~~	2nd place, silver medalist(s)	216	222	~~225~~	3rd place, bronze medalist(s)	412	3rd place, bronze medalist(s)
Youth Olympic Games
2018	Buenos Aires, Argentina	+85 kg	165	170	173	1st place, gold medalist(s)	196	202	206	2nd place, silver medalist(s)	379	2nd place, silver medalist(s)
World Junior Weightlifting Championships
2019	Suva, Fiji	109 kg	166	~~171~~	175	3rd place, bronze medalist(s)	~~200~~	~~200~~	—	—	NM	—
2021	Tashkent, Uzbekistan	109 kg	180	~~186~~	187	2nd place, silver medalist(s)	211	216	~~223~~	1st place, gold medalist(s)	403	1st place, gold medalist(s)
World Youth Weightlifting Championships
2017	Bangkok, Thailand	+94 kg	137	143	145	1st place, gold medalist(s)	171	176	—	1st place, gold medalist(s)	321	1st place, gold medalist(s)
European Youth Weightlifting Championships
2017	Pristina, Kosovo	+94 kg	150	155	160	1st place, gold medalist(s)	185	190	195	1st place, gold medalist(s)	355	1st place, gold medalist(s)
2018	San Donato Milanese, Italy	+94 kg	160	165	166	1st place, gold medalist(s)	190	198	~~203~~	2nd place, silver medalist(s)	364	1st place, gold medalist(s)
European Junior & U23 Weightlifting Championships
2017	Durrës, Albania	105 kg	155	160	165	4	190	198	204	4	369	4
2019	Bucharest, Romania	109 kg	170	175	180	1st place, gold medalist(s)	205	210	216 EJR	1st place, gold medalist(s)	396 EJR	1st place, gold medalist(s)
Qatar International Cup
2019	Doha, Qatar	109 kg	174	179	184	2nd place, silver medalist(s)	205	213	216	2nd place, silver medalist(s)	400	2nd place, silver medalist(s)
Malta International Open
2020	Valletta, Malta	109 kg	~~177~~	177	182	1st place, gold medalist(s)	205	213	219	1st place, gold medalist(s)	401	1st place, gold medalist(s)
