= Anhelina Lomachynska =

Ukrainian weightlifter (born 1996)

Personal information
- Native name: Ангеліна Ломачинська
- Born: 2 September 1996 (age 29) Khmelnytskyi Oblast, Ukraine
- Occupation: Sports instructor
- Employer: Armed Forces of Ukraine

Sport
- Country: Ukraine
- Sport: Weightlifting
- Weight class: 49 kg
Medal record
Women's weightlifting
Representing Ukraine
European Championships
Silver medal – second place	2022 Tirana	49 kg
Bronze medal – third place	2023 Yerevan	49 kg
European Junior & U23 Championships
Gold medal – first place	2018 Zamość	U23 48 kg
Silver medal – second place	2019 Bucharest	U23 49 kg

Anhelina Lomachynska (Ukrainian: Ангеліна Ломачинська, born 2 September 1996, Khmelnytskyi Oblast) is a Ukrainian weightlifter. She is a silver and bronze medalist of the European Weightlifting Championships.

== Career ==
Lomachynska participated in the 2017 Summer Universiade in Taipei where she finished 7th in the 48 kg category after lifting 73 kg in snatch and 87 in clean & jerk (160 in total). She won gold in the 48 kg category at the 2018 European U23 Championships. One year later, she was second.

Lomachynska debuted at the senior level in 2021 when she finished 5th in the 45 kg category at the 2021 European Weightlifting Championships held in Moscow, Russia After she had changed the weight category to 49 kg, she won a silver medal at the 2022 European Weightlifting Championships held in Tirana, Albania.

Lomachynska won the bronze medal in the women's 49 kg event at the 2023 European Weightlifting Championships held in Yerevan, Armenia.

== Major results ==
Year	Venue	Weight	Snatch (kg)				Clean & Jerk (kg)				Total	Rank
Year	Venue	Weight	1	2	3	Rank	1	2	3	Rank	Total	Rank
European Championships
2021	Moscow, Russia	45 kg	67	~~69~~	~~69~~	3rd place, bronze medalist(s)	~~82~~	82	~~85~~	5	149	5
2022	Tirana, Albania	49 kg	75	77	80	1st place, gold medalist(s)	~~89~~	87	~~89~~	3rd place, bronze medalist(s)	167	2nd place, silver medalist(s)
2023	Yerevan, Armenia	49 kg	79	81	~~83~~	3rd place, bronze medalist(s)	~~94~~	~~95~~	95	5	176	3rd place, bronze medalist(s)

== Personal life ==
Lomachynska resides in Bila Tserkva and works as sports instructor for the Armed Forces of Ukraine.
