= Davide Ruiu =

Italian weightlifter (born 2001)

Personal information
- Born: 22 June 2001 (age 23); Sassari, Italy

Sport
- Country: Italy
- Sport: Weightlifting

Davide Ruiu (born 22 June 2001) is an Italian weightlifter. He represented Italy at the 2020 Summer Olympics in Tokyo, Japan. He finished in 6th place in the men's 61 kg event.

He won the gold medal in his event at the 2018 European Youth Weightlifting Championships held in San Donato Milanese, Italy. He also competed in the men's 61 kg event at the 2018 World Weightlifting Championships held in Ashgabat, Turkmenistan.

In 2019, he won the gold medal in the men's junior 61 kg event at the European Junior & U23 Weightlifting Championships in Bucharest, Romania. In that same year, he also won the bronze medal in the men's 61 kg event at the 6th International Qatar Cup held in Doha, Qatar.

He also competed at the 2019 European Weightlifting Championships held in Batumi, Georgia and the 2021 European Weightlifting Championships held in Moscow, Russia.

In 2021, he finished in 6th place in the men's 61 kg event at the 2020 Summer Olympics in Tokyo, Japan.
