= Alessia Durante =

Italian weightlifter (born 1999)

Personal information
- Born: 14 May 1999 (age 27)

Sport
- Country: Italy
- Sport: Weightlifting
- Weight class: 71 kg
Medal record
Women's weightlifting
Representing Italy
European Championships
Silver medal – second place	2021 Moscow	71 kg
IWF World Cup
Silver medal – second place	2020 Rome	71 kg

Alessia Durante (born 14 May 1999) is an Italian weightlifter. She won the silver medal in the women's 71 kg event at the 2021 European Weightlifting Championships held in Moscow, Russia.

In 2019, Durante won the gold medal in the women's junior 71 kg event at the European Junior & U23 Weightlifting Championships in Bucharest, Romania. In 2020, she won the silver medal in her event at the Roma 2020 World Cup in Rome, Italy.
