= Anton Pliesnoi =

Georgian weightlifter (born 1996)

Personal information
- Nationality: Ukraine → Georgia
- Born: 17 September 1996 (age 30) Dnipro, Ukraine
- Weight: 96.00 kg (212 lb)

Sport
- Country: Georgia
- Sport: Weightlifting
- Event: –96 kg
Medal record
Olympic Games
| Bronze medal – third place | 2020 Tokyo | –96 kg |
World Championships
| Bronze medal – third place | 2019 Pattaya | –96 kg |
European Championships
| Bronze medal – third place | 2019 Batumi | –96 kg |
| Gold medal – first place | 2021 Moscow | –96 kg |

Anton Pliesnoi (Georgian: ანტონ პლესნოი, romanized: ant'on p'lesnoi; Ukrainian: Антон Плесной; born 17 September 1996) is a Georgian and Ukrainian weightlifter competing in the 94 kg division until 2018 and 96 kg starting in 2018 after the International Weightlifting Federation reorganized the categories.

== Career ==
In 2012 Anton performed for the first time at the European Youth Championship in Ukraine's squad, where he took fifth place in -77 kg category lifting 275 kg. Since 2018 he represents Georgia.

He competed at the 2019 European Weightlifting Championships winning a bronze medal in the total.

He took part in the 2020 Olympic Games in Tokyo, where in the 96 kg class he lifted 177 kg in the snatch and 210 kg in the Clean and Jerk. The total of 387 kg placed him third, earning him an olympic bronze medal.

In December 2021 he was tested positive for SARMs, specifically LGD-4033, and banned for almost four years

== Major results ==
| Year | Venue | Weight | Snatch (kg) | | | | Clean & Jerk (kg) | | | | Total | Rank |
| Year | Venue | Weight | 1 | 2 | 3 | Rank | 1 | 2 | 3 | Rank | Total | Rank |
Olympic Games
| 2021 | Tokyo, Japan | 96 kg | 173 | ~~177~~ | 177 | 4 | 206 | ~~210~~ | 210 | 3 | 387 | 3rd place, bronze medalist(s) |
World Championships
| 2018 | Ashgabat, Turkmenistan | 96 kg | 167 | 173 | ~~177~~ | 7 | 198 | 206 | ~~211~~ | 11 | 379 | 8 |
| 2019 | Pattaya, Thailand | 96 kg | 172 | 177 | 181 | 1st place, gold medalist(s) | 203 | 209 | 213 | 4 | 394 | 3rd place, bronze medalist(s) |
European Championships
| 2019 | (Georgia (country)) Batumi, Georgia | 96 kg | 165 | 170 | 173 | 2nd place, silver medalist(s) | 198 | ~~204~~ | 204 | 4 | 377 | 3rd place, bronze medalist(s) |
| 2021 | Moscow, Russia | 96 kg | 171 | 175 | 180 | 1st place, gold medalist(s) | 207 | 213 | ~~221~~ | 1st place, gold medalist(s) | 393 | 1st place, gold medalist(s) |
European U23 Championships
| 2019 | Bucharest, Romania | 96 kg | ~~168~~ | 168 | 173 | 1st place, gold medalist(s) | 200 | 208 | 215 | 1st place, gold medalist(s) | 388 | 1st place, gold medalist(s) |
World cup
| 2020 | Rome, Italy | 96 kg | 170 | 176 | ~~180~~ | 1st place, gold medalist(s) | 201 | 210 | ~~220~~ | 1st place, gold medalist(s) | 386 | 1st place, gold medalist(s) |
