= Valentin Genchev =

Bulgarian weightlifter (born 2000)

Personal information
- Native name: Валентин Генчев
- Full name: Valentin Genchev
- Nationality: Bulgarian
- Born: 3 April 2000 (age 26)
- Weight: 67 kg (148 lb)

Sport
- Country: Bulgaria
- Sport: Weightlifting
- Weight class: =67 kg
- Coached by: Stoyan Stoyanov
Medal record
Representing Bulgaria
European Championships
Gold medal – first place	2022 Tirana	–67 kg
Bronze medal – third place	2021 Moscow	–67 kg
European Junior & U23 Weightlifting Championships
Bronze medal – third place	2019 Bucharest	–67 kg
Silver medal – second place	2021 Rovaniemi	–67 kg

Valentin Genchev (Bulgarian: Валентин Генчев; born 3 April 2000) is a Bulgarian weightlifter.

== Career ==
=== European Championships ===
During the 2021 European Weightlifting Championships, he competed in the 67 kg category, winning the silver medal in the clean & jerk portion with the bronze medal in the total.

During the 2022 European Weightlifting Championships, he competed in the 67 kg category, winning the silver in the snatch portion with the gold medal in the clean & jerk and in the total.

== Major results ==
Year	Venue	Weight	Snatch (kg)				Clean & Jerk (kg)				Total	Rank
Year	Venue	Weight	1	2	3	Rank	1	2	3	Rank	Total	Rank
World Championships
2021	Tashkent, Uzbekistan	67 kg	132	135	~~137~~	10	168	173	~~176~~	5	308	5
2022	Bogotá, Colombia	67 kg	~~130~~	130	~~135~~	16	166	~~172~~	~~172~~	10	296	14
2023	Riyadh, Saudi Arabia	67 kg	130	~~135~~	135	8	167	~~170~~	~~170~~	8	302	7
2024	Manama, Bahrain	67 kg	~~125~~	125	~~131~~	20	~~160~~	—	—	—	—	
European Championships
2021	Moscow, Russia	67 kg	132	136	138	7	168	173	177	2nd place, silver medalist(s)	315	(bronze)
2022	Tirana, Albania	67 kg	133	136	139	2nd place, silver medalist(s)	169	175	~~180~~	1st place, gold medalist(s)	314	(gold)
2023	Yerevan, Armenia	67 kg	125	~~128~~	~~128~~	8	160	166	—	3rd place, bronze medalist(s)	291	6
2024	Sofia, Bulgaria	67 kg	125	128	130	10	160	~~166~~	~~166~~	6	290	8
European Junior & U23 Weightlifting Championships
2018	Zamość, Poland	69 kg	120	124	126	8	150	155	~~160~~	8	281	8
2019	Bucharest, Romania	67 kg	129	132	134	3rd place, bronze medalist(s)	160	165	~~169~~	3rd place, bronze medalist(s)	299	(bronze)
2021	Rovaniemi, Finland	67 kg	123	127	129	2nd place, silver medalist(s)	~~155~~	155	159	2nd place, silver medalist(s)	287	(silver)
