= Berfin Altun =

Turkish weightlifter (born 1999)

Personal information
- Full name: Berfin Altun
- Born: 1 November 1999 (age 26)
- Weight: 65.38 kg (144 lb)

Sport
- Country: Turkey
- Sport: Weightlifting
- Club: Kağıtspor
Medal record
Women's weightlifting
Representing Turkey
Islamic Solidarity Games
Silver medal – second place	2021 Konya	64 kg CJ
Bronze medal – third place	2021 Konya	64 kg T
World Junior Championships
Bronze medal – third place	2019 Suva	-71 kg
European Junior & U23 Championships
Gold medal – first place	2019 Bucharest	-64 kg
Silver medal – second place	2016 Eilat	-63 kg

Berfin Altun (born 1 November 1999) is a Turkish weightlifter competing in the women's –71 kg division. She is a member of Kocaeli Büyükşehir Belediyesi Kağıt Spor Kulübü.

== Major results ==
Altun became silver medalist in the Clean and jerk event and in total at the 2016 European Junior & U23 Weightlifting Championships held in n Eilat, Israel. At the 2018 European Junior & U23 Weightlifting Championships in Zamość, Poland, she captured the gold medal in the 69 kg Clean& Jerk event. In 2019, she took the silver medal in the 71 kg Clean & Jerk event and the bronze medal at the Junior World Weightlifting Championships in Suva, Fiji. At the 2019 European Junior & U23 Weightlifting Championships in Bucharest, Romania, she won the bronze medal in the -64 kg Snatch event, and gold medals in the Clean & Jerk event, and became champion. She won the bronze medal in the Clean and jerk event at the 2021 European Weightlifting Championships held in Moscow, Russia.

Year	Venue	Weight	Snatch (kg)				Clean & Jerk (kg)				Total (kg)	Rank
Year	Venue	Weight	1	2	3	Rank	1	2	3	Rank	Total (kg)	Rank
European Championships
2021	Moscow, Russia	71 kg	85	88	~~90~~	17	115	119	121	3rd place, bronze medalist(s)	209	6
2022	Tirana, Albania	64 kg	~~83~~	83	86	12	117	120	~~123~~	2nd place, silver medalist(s)	206	5
