= Ivana Petrova =

Bulgarian weightlifter (born 2001)

Personal information
- Nationality: Bulgaria
- Born: 26 August 2001 (age 24)
- Weight: 45 kg (99 lb)

Sport
- Country: Bulgaria
- Sport: Weightlifting
- Weight class: 45 kg
- Club: TSK Targovishte
- Coached by: Ivan Paskalev
Medal record
European Championships
Silver medal – second place	2019 Batumi	–45 kg
Silver medal – second place	2021 Moscow	–45 kg
European Youth Championships
Gold medal – first place	2017 Pristina	–44 kg
Gold medal – first place	2018 San Donato Milanese	–44 kg

Ivana Petrova (Bulgarian: Ивана Петрова; born 26 August 2001) is a Bulgarian weightlifter, most recently competing in the 45 kg division at the 2021 European Weightlifting Championships.

== Career ==
She won the silver medal at the 2019 European Weightlifting Championships and 2021 European Weightlifting Championships in the 45 kg division.

== Major results ==
Year	Venue	Weight	Snatch (kg)				Clean & Jerk (kg)				Total	Rank
Year	Venue	Weight	1	2	3	Rank	1	2	3	Rank	Total	Rank
European Championships
2019	(Georgia (country)) Batumi, Georgia	45 kg	65	67	69	3rd place, bronze medalist(s)	83	85	89	1st place, gold medalist(s)	158	2nd place, silver medalist(s)
2021	Moscow, Russia	45 kg	65	67	~~69~~	4	~~85~~	85	~~89~~	1st place, gold medalist(s)	152	2nd place, silver medalist(s)
European Youth Weightlifting Championships
2017	Pristina, Kosovo	44 kg	~~55~~	55	57	1st place, gold medalist(s)	70	72	75	1st place, gold medalist(s)	132	1st place, gold medalist(s)
2018	San Donato Milanese, Italy	44 kg	60	63	65	1st place, gold medalist(s)	75	78	80	1st place, gold medalist(s)	145	1st place, gold medalist(s)
