= Daria Riazanova =

Russian weightlifter (born 2000)

Personal information
- Born: 24 August 2000 (age 25)

Sport
- Country: Russia
- Sport: Weightlifting
- Weight class: 87 kg
Medal record
Women's weightlifting
Representing Russia
European Championships
Bronze medal – third place	2021 Moscow	87 kg

Daria Riazanova (born 24 August 2000) is a Russian weightlifter. She won the bronze medal in the women's 87 kg event at the 2021 European Weightlifting Championships held in Moscow, Russia.

== Career ==
Daria Riazanova was born on 24 August 2000.

She competed at 2015 Youth World Championships in the women's +69 kg event and finished seventh with 186 kg in total. She won the bronze medal at 2015 Youth European Championships with 197 kg. Next year she won the silver medal in same event with a total result 15 kg better than last year. She won 2017 Youth World Championships in the women's +75 kg event.

She became European Junior champion in 2017 in women's 90 kg event with 231 kg in total (100 kg in snatch, 131 kg in clean&jerk). In following year she won the silver medal at World Junior Championships. She competed in new event 87 kg and finished it with 98 kg in snatch and 132 kg in clean&jerk.

In 2021 Riazanova won the silver medal in the women's 87 kg at Russian National Championships in Grozny with 230 kg in total. Then she won the bronze medal at 2021 European Championships in Moscow behind Daria Akhmerova of Russia and Elena Cîlcic of Moldova. Riazanova said her medal was "a step to more valuable awards".
