= Zulfat Garaev =

Russian weightlifter (born 2000)

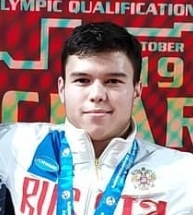

Personal information
- Born: 12 January 2000 (age 26) Naberezhnye Chelny, Russia

Sport
- Country: Russia
- Sport: Weightlifting
Medal record
Men's weightlifting
Representing Russian Weightlifting Federation
World Championships
Bronze medal – third place	2021 Tashkent	67 kg
Representing Russia
Junior World Championships
Bronze medal – third place	2019 Suva	67 kg
European Youth Championships
Gold medal – first place	2017 Pristina	62 kg

Zulfat Irekovich Garaev (Russian: Зулфат Ирекович Гараев; born 12 January 2000) is a Russian weightlifter. He won the bronze medal in the men's 67 kg event at the 2021 World Weightlifting Championships held in Tashkent, Uzbekistan.

== Career ==
In 2021, he finished in 4th place in the men's 67 kg event at the European Weightlifting Championships held in Moscow, Russia.

He won the gold medal in his event at the 2021 European Junior & U23 Weightlifting Championships held in Rovaniemi, Finland.

== Achievements ==
Year	Venue	Weight	Snatch (kg)				Clean & Jerk (kg)				Total	Rank
Year	Venue	Weight	1	2	3	Rank	1	2	3	Rank	Total	Rank
World Championships
2021	Tashkent, Uzbekistan	67 kg	142	146	~~148~~	1st place, gold medalist(s)	165	~~169~~	169	7	315	3rd place, bronze medalist(s)
European Championships
2021	Moscow, Russia	67 kg	140	144	147	2nd place, silver medalist(s)	167	~~172~~	~~172~~	6	314	4
2026	(Georgia (country)) Batumi, Georgia	71 kg	140	~~146~~	146	4	165	~~170~~	~~170~~	8	311	5
