= Karen Avagyan =

Armenian weightlifter (born 1999)

Personal information
- Born: 12 May 1999 (age 27)

Sport
- Country: Armenia
- Sport: Weightlifting
- Weight class: 89 kg
Medal record
Men's weightlifting
Representing Armenia
European Championships
Gold medal – first place	2021 Moscow	89 kg

Karen Avagyan (born 12 May 1999) is an Armenian weightlifter. In 2021, he won the gold medal in the men's 89 kg event at the 2021 European Weightlifting Championships held in Moscow, Russia.

In 2019, he won the gold medal in the men's junior 89 kg event at the 2019 European Junior & U23 Weightlifting Championships in Bucharest, Romania. At the 2021 European Junior & U23 Weightlifting Championships in Rovaniemi, Finland, he also won the gold medal in his event.
