= Daria Akhmerova =

Russian weightlifter (born 1999)

Personal information
- Native name: Дарья Викторовна Ахмерова
- Full name: Daria Viktorovna Akhmerova
- Born: 14 April 1999 (age 27)

Sport
- Country: Russia
- Sport: Weightlifting
Medal record
Women's weightlifting
Representing Russia
European Championships
Gold medal – first place	2021 Moscow	87 kg
Representing Kazakhstan
Junior World Championships
Gold medal – first place	2019 Suva	87 kg

Daria Viktorovna Akhmerova (Russian: Дарья Викторовна Ахмерова, born 14 April 1999) is a Russian weightlifter. She won the gold medal in the women's 87 kg event at the 2021 European Weightlifting Championships held in Moscow, Russia.

== Career ==
She represented Kazakhstan at the 2019 Junior World Weightlifting Championships held in Suva, Fiji and she won the gold medal in the women's 87 kg event.

At the 2021 European Junior & U23 Weightlifting Championships in Rovaniemi, Finland, she won the gold medal in her event. She also won the bronze medal in the clean & jerk in the women's 87 kg event at the 2021 World Weightlifting Championships held in Tashkent, Uzbekistan.

== Achievements ==
Year	Venue	Weight	Snatch (kg)				Clean & Jerk (kg)				Total	Rank
Year	Venue	Weight	1	2	3	Rank	1	2	3	Rank	Total	Rank
World Championships
2021	Tashkent, Uzbekistan	87 kg	105	~~109~~	~~109~~	4	135	~~140~~	~~140~~	3rd place, bronze medalist(s)	240	4
European Championships
2021	Moscow, Russia	87 kg	103	106	108	2nd place, silver medalist(s)	132	136	138	2nd place, silver medalist(s)	246	1st place, gold medalist(s)
