= Marcos Ruiz =

Spanish weightlifter (born 1996)

Personal information
- Citizenship: Spanish
- Born: 13 October 1996 (age 29) Molins de Rei, Spain

Sport
- Country: Spain
- Sport: Weightlifting
- Weight class: 102 kg
Medal record
World Championships
Bronze medal – third place	2024 Manama	102 kg
European Championships
Silver medal – second place	2025 Chișinău	102 kg
Bronze medal – third place	2022 Tirana	102 kg
Mediterranean Games
Gold medal – first place	2022 Oran	102 kg S
Gold medal – first place	2026 Taranto	110 kg S
Silver medal – second place	2022 Oran	102 kg CJ
Silver medal – second place	2026 Taranto	110 kg CJ

Marcos Ruiz Velasco (born 13 October 1996) is a Spanish weightlifter. He represented Spain at the 2020 Summer Olympics in Tokyo, Japan.

He won two medals at the 2022 Mediterranean Games held in Oran, Algeria. He won the gold medal in the men's 102 kg Snatch event and the silver medal in the men's 102 kg Clean & Jerk event.
