= Elena Erighina =

Moldovan weightlifter (born 1996)

Personal information
- Born: 3 June 1996 (age 30)

Sport
- Country: Moldova
- Sport: Weightlifting
- Weight class: 87 kg
Medal record
Women's weightlifting
Representing Moldova
European Championships
Gold medal – first place	2025 Chișinău	81 kg
Silver medal – second place	2021 Moscow	87 kg
Silver medal – second place	2024 Sofia	81 kg
Bronze medal – third place	2023 Yerevan	81 kg
IWF World Cup
Silver medal – second place	2020 Rome	87 kg

Elena Erighina (née Cîlcic, born 3 June 1996) is a Moldovan weightlifter. She won the silver medal in the women's 87 kg event at the 2021 European Weightlifting Championships held in Moscow, Russia.

== Career ==
She won the bronze medal in the under-23 women's 75 kg event at the 2018 European Junior & U23 Weightlifting Championships held in Zamość, Poland. In 2019, she won the gold medal in the under-23 women's 87 kg event at the European Junior & U23 Weightlifting Championships in Bucharest, Romania.

She also competed in the women's 81 kg event at the 2018 World Weightlifting Championships held in Ashgabat, Turkmenistan and in the women's 87 kg event at the 2019 World Weightlifting Championships held in Pattaya, Thailand.

In 2020, she won the silver medal in the women's 87 kg event at the Roma 2020 World Cup in Rome, Italy.

She represented Moldova at the 2020 Summer Olympics in Tokyo, Japan. She finished in 8th place in the women's 87 kg event.

== Major results ==
Year	Venue	Weight	Snatch (kg)				Clean & Jerk (kg)				Total	Rank
Year	Venue	Weight	1	2	3	Rank	1	2	3	Rank	Total	Rank
Summer Olympics
2021	Tokyo, Japan	87 kg	105	~~109~~	~~109~~	—N/a	130	135	~~139~~	—N/a	240	8
European Championships
2021	Moscow, Russia	87 kg	103	107	~~110~~	3rd place, bronze medalist(s)	129	134	138	1st place, gold medalist(s)	245	2nd place, silver medalist(s)
2023	Yerevan , Armenia	81 kg	100	~~104~~	104	2nd place, silver medalist(s)	125	130	~~134~~	4	234	3rd place, bronze medalist(s)
2024	Sofia, Bulgaria	81 kg	~~99~~	99	103	2nd place, silver medalist(s)	126	129	131	2nd place, silver medalist(s)	234	2nd place, silver medalist(s)
2025	Chișinău, Moldova	81 kg	~~102~~	103	106	1st place, gold medalist(s)	130	134	136	1st place, gold medalist(s)	242	1st place, gold medalist(s)
