= Jon Luke Mau =

German weightlifter

Personal information
- Citizenship: German
- Born: 2 October 1998 (age 26)

Sport
- Country: Germany
- Sport: Weightlifting
- Weight class: 61 kg

John Luke Mau is a German weightlifter. He represented Germany at the 2019 World Weightlifting Championships, and in 2018, as well as the 2019 and 2021 European Championships.

At the 2021 European Junior & U23 Weightlifting Championships in Rovaniemi, Finland, he won the gold medal in his event.
