= Daniel Lungu =

Moldovan weightlifter

Personal information
- Citizenship: Moldovan
- Born: 16 October 1998 (age 26)

Sport
- Country: Moldova
- Sport: Weightlifting
- Weight class: 55 kg

Daniel Lungu is a Moldovan weightlifter. He represented Moldova at the 2019 World Weightlifting Championships, as well as the 2019 and 2021 European Championships.

At the 2021 European Junior & U23 Weightlifting Championships in Rovaniemi, Finland, he won the bronze medal in his event.
