= 2018 European Junior & U23 Weightlifting Championships =

International weightlifting competition

- Venue: OSiR Zamość
- Location: Zamość, Poland
- Dates: 20–27 October
- Competitors: 342 from 35 nations

The 2018 European Junior & U23 Weightlifting Championships took place in OSiR Zamość, Zamość, Poland from 20 October to 27 October 2018.

== Team ranking ==
Rank	Men's Junior		Women's Junior		Men's Under-23		Women's Under-23	
Rank	Team	Points	Team	Points	Team	Points	Team	Points
1	Belarus	575	Russia	574	Ukraine	528	Russia	557
2	Armenia	516	Turkey	574	Georgia	527	Poland	509
3	Ukraine	509	Poland	477	Russia	453	Ukraine	432
4	Russia	506	Romania	458	Poland	340	Belarus	313
5	Turkey	459	Ukraine	423	Belarus	324	Azerbaijan	232
6	Poland	425	Italy	251	Armenia	311	Turkey	217

== Medal overview ==
=== Juniors ===
==== Men ====
Event		Gold		Silver		Bronze	
– 56 kg	Snatch	Pavlo Zalipskyi (UKR)	112 kg	Daniel Lungu (MDA)	110 kg	Marian Cristian Luca (ROU)	107 kg
– 56 kg	Clean & Jerk	Sergio Massidda (ITA)	133 kg	Valentin Iancu-Ionadi (ROU)	130 kg	Marian Cristian Luca (ROU)	130 kg
– 56 kg	Total	Pavlo Zalipskyi (UKR)	240 kg	Daniel Lungu (MDA)	240 kg	Sergio Massidda (ITA)	238 kg
– 62 kg	Snatch	Zulfat Garaev (RUS)	134 kg	Henadz Laptseu (BLR)	130 kg	İsa Güngör (TUR)	120 kg
– 62 kg	Clean & Jerk	Henadz Laptseu (BLR)	161 kg	Zulfat Garaev (RUS)	156 kg	Dmytro Sukhotskyi (UKR)	150 kg
– 62 kg	Total	Henadz Laptseu (BLR)	291 kg	Zulfat Garaev (RUS)	290 kg	Ramazan Kara (TUR)	267 kg
– 69 kg	Snatch	Ramazan İlhan (TUR)	139 kg	Ilya Zharnouski (BLR)	138 kg	Armen Grigoryan (ARM)	136 kg
– 69 kg	Clean & Jerk	Paul Dumitraşcu (ROU)	170 kg	Piotr Kudłaszyk (POL)	166 kg	Armen Grigoryan (ARM)	165 kg
– 69 kg	Total	Paul Dumitraşcu (ROU)	302 kg	Armen Grigoryan (ARM)	301 kg	Ramazan İlhan (TUR)	300 kg
– 77 kg	Snatch	Rafik Harutyunyan (ARM)	146 kg	Ihar Lozka (BLR)	145 kg	Korneluk Przemysław (POL)	142 kg
– 77 kg	Clean & Jerk	Ihar Lozka (BLR)	182 kg	Rafik Harutyunyan (ARM)	180 kg	Korneluk Przemysław (POL)	174 kg
– 77 kg	Total	Ihar Lozka (BLR)	327 kg	Rafik Harutyunyan (ARM)	326 kg	Korneluk Przemysław (POL)	316 kg
– 85 kg	Snatch	Revaz Davitadze (GEO)	165 kg	Ritvars Suharevs (LAT)	164 kg	Bartłomiej Adamus (POL)	158 kg
– 85 kg	Clean & Jerk	Ritvars Suharevs (LAT)	196 kg	Revaz Davitadze (GEO)	196 kg	Bartłomiej Adamus (POL)	186 kg
– 85 kg	Total	Revaz Davitadze (GEO)	361 kg	Ritvars Suharevs (LAT)	360 kg	Bartłomiej Adamus (POL)	344 kg
– 94 kg	Snatch	Yauheni Tsikhantsou (BLR)	178 kg	Kyryl Pyrohov (UKR)	168 kg	Samvel Babakyan (ARM)	165 kg
– 94 kg	Clean & Jerk	Yauheni Tsikhantsou (BLR)	207 kg	Samvel Babakyan (ARM)	196 kg	Karen Avagyan (ARM)	193 kg
– 94 kg	Total	Yauheni Tsikhantsou (BLR)	385 kg	Samvel Babakyan (ARM)	361 kg	Kyryl Pyrohov (UKR)	360 kg
– 105 kg	Snatch	Irakli Chkheidze (GEO)	170 kg	Arsen Martirosyan (ARM)	165 kg	Daniil Vagaitsev (RUS)	164 kg
– 105 kg	Clean & Jerk	Irakli Chkheidze (GEO)	216 kg	David Fischer (AUT)	205 kg	Arsen Martirosyan (ARM)	201 kg
– 105 kg	Total	Irakli Chkheidze (GEO)	386 kg	David Fischer (AUT)	367 kg	Arsen Martirosyan (ARM)	366 kg
+ 105 kg	Snatch	Eduard Ziaziulin (BLR)	190 kg	Varazdat Lalayan (ARM)	184 kg	Oleh Hanzenko (UKR)	176 kg
+ 105 kg	Clean & Jerk	Eduard Ziaziulin (BLR)	223 kg	Varazdat Lalayan (ARM)	222 kg	Dmitrii Gogichaev (RUS)	216 kg
+ 105 kg	Total	Eduard Ziaziulin (BLR)	413 kg	Varazdat Lalayan (ARM)	406 kg	Dmitrii Gogichaev (RUS)	386 kg

==== Women ====
Event		Gold		Silver		Bronze	
– 48 kg	Snatch	Dayana Dimitrova (BUL)	72 kg	Giulia Imperio (ITA)	71 kg	Kseniia Kozina (RUS)	70 kg
– 48 kg	Clean & Jerk	Dayana Dimitrova (BUL)	92 kg	Gamze Karakol (TUR)	91 kg	Sylwia Oleśkiewicz (POL)	86 kg
– 48 kg	Total	Dayana Dimitrova (BUL)	164 kg	Gamze Karakol (TUR)	161 kg	Kseniia Kozina (RUS)	153 kg
– 53 kg	Snatch	Kristina Novitskaia (RUS)	85 kg	Kamila Konotop (UKR)	84 kg	Lucrezia Magistris (ITA)	80 kg
– 53 kg	Clean & Jerk	Kristina Novitskaia (RUS)	106 kg	Sabina Azimova (AZE)	100 kg	Lucrezia Magistris (ITA)	99 kg
– 53 kg	Total	Kristina Novitskaia (RUS)	191 kg	Kamila Konotop (UKR)	182 kg	Lucrezia Magistris (ITA)	179 kg
– 58 kg	Snatch	Raluca Andreea Olaru (ROU)	90 kg	Andreea Penciu (ROU)	89 kg	Ayşegül Çakın (TUR)	88 kg
– 58 kg	Clean & Jerk	Ayşegül Çakın (TUR)	110 kg	Raluca Andreea Olaru (ROU)	107 kg	Andreea Penciu (ROU)	107 kg
– 58 kg	Total	Ayşegül Çakın (TUR)	198 kg	Raluca Andreea Olaru (ROU)	197 kg	Andreea Penciu (ROU)	196 kg
– 63 kg	Snatch	Rebeka Koha (LAT)	100 kg	Nuray Levent (TUR)	92 kg	Suizanna Valodzka (BLR)	91 kg
– 63 kg	Clean & Jerk	Rebeka Koha (LAT)	120 kg	Nuray Levent (TUR)	115 kg	Maria Luana Grigoriu (ROU)	111 kg
– 63 kg	Total	Rebeka Koha (LAT)	220 kg	Nuray Levent (TUR)	207 kg	Suizanna Valodzka (BLR)	201 kg
– 69 kg	Snatch	Alexandra Alexe (ROU)	92 kg	Mariya Andreeva (RUS)	91 kg	Ilia Hernández (ESP)	88 kg
– 69 kg	Clean & Jerk	Berfin Altun (TUR)	115 kg	Ilia Hernández (ESP)	115 kg	Alexandra Alexe (ROU)	111 kg
– 69 kg	Total	Alexandra Alexe (ROU)	203 kg	Ilia Hernández (ESP)	203 kg	Mariya Andreeva (RUS)	201 kg
– 75 kg	Snatch	Nicole Rubanovich (ISR)	97 kg	Tatiana Tydyyakova (RUS)	93 kg	Dilara Narin (TUR)	92 kg
– 75 kg	Clean & Jerk	Dilara Narin (TUR)	120 kg	Tatiana Tydyyakova (RUS)	117 kg	Nicole Rubanovich (ISR)	112 kg
– 75 kg	Total	Dilara Narin (TUR)	212 kg	Tatiana Tydyyakova (RUS)	210 kg	Nicole Rubanovich (ISR)	209 kg
– 90 kg	Snatch	Sarah Fischer (AUT)	101 kg	Daria Riazanova (RUS)	100 kg	Tuğçe Boynueğri (TUR)	97 kg
– 90 kg	Clean & Jerk	Daria Riazanova (RUS)	131 kg	Sarah Fischer (AUT)	129 kg	Diana Aghabekyan (ARM)	119 kg
– 90 kg	Total	Daria Riazanova (RUS)	231 kg	Sarah Fischer (AUT)	230 kg	Tuğçe Boynueğri (TUR)	214 kg
+ 90 kg	Snatch	Magdalena Karolak (POL)	103 kg	Anna Zubko (RUS)	100 kg	Melike Günal (TUR)	99 kg
+ 90 kg	Clean & Jerk	Arpine Dalalyan (ARM)	137 kg	Magdalena Karolak (POL)	136 kg	Melike Günal (TUR)	127 kg
+ 90 kg	Total	Magdalena Karolak (POL)	239 kg	Arpine Dalalyan (ARM)	232 kg	Melike Günal (TUR)	226 kg

=== Under-23 ===
==== Men ====
Event		Gold		Silver		Bronze	
– 56 kg	Snatch	Mirco Scarantino (ITA)	116 kg	Oleg Musokhranov (RUS)	115 kg	Dmytro Voronovskyi (UKR)	104 kg
– 56 kg	Clean & Jerk	Mirco Scarantino (ITA)	142 kg	Oleg Musokhranov (RUS)	141 kg	Ilie Ciotoiu (ROU)	133 kg
– 56 kg	Total	Mirco Scarantino (ITA)	258 kg	Oleg Musokhranov (RUS)	256 kg	Dmytro Voronovskyi (UKR)	235 kg
– 62 kg	Snatch	Ferdi Hardal (TUR)	123 kg	Mahammad Mammadli (AZE)	121 kg	Yaroslav Zabolotnyi (UKR)	120 kg
– 62 kg	Clean & Jerk	Mahammad Mammadli (AZE)	156 kg	Goderdzi Berelidze (GEO)	146 kg	Ferdi Hardal (TUR)	143 kg
– 62 kg	Total	Mahammad Mammadli (AZE)	271 kg	Ferdi Hardal (TUR)	266 kg	Yaroslav Zabolotnyi (UKR)	259 kg
– 69 kg	Snatch	Mirko Zanni (ITA)	140 kg	Goga Chkheidze (GEO)	139 kg	Maxim Konoplev (RUS)	139 kg
– 69 kg	Clean & Jerk	Goga Chkheidze (GEO)	174 kg	Ibrahimli Pasha (AZE)	165 kg	Maxim Konoplev (RUS)	165 kg
– 69 kg	Total	Goga Chkheidze (GEO)	313 kg	Mirko Zanni (ITA)	304 kg	Maxim Konoplev (RUS)	304 kg
– 77 kg	Snatch	Viacheslav Iarkin (RUS)	151 kg	Bozhidar Andreev (BUL)	150 kg	Celil Erdoğdu (TUR)	149 kg
– 77 kg	Clean & Jerk	Bozhidar Andreev (BUL)	188 kg	Viacheslav Iarkin (RUS)	186 kg	Artsem Shahau (BLR)	180 kg
– 77 kg	Total	Bozhidar Andreev (BUL)	338 kg	Viacheslav Iarkin (RUS)	337 kg	Artsem Shahau (BLR)	328 kg
– 85 kg	Snatch	Andranik Karapetyan (ARM)	176 kg EU23R	Roman Chepik (RUS)	155 kg	Doru Ilie Stoian (ROU)	154 kg
– 85 kg	Clean & Jerk	Andranik Karapetyan (ARM)	193 kg	Roman Chepik (RUS)	192 kg	Brandon Vautard (FRA)	191 kg
– 85 kg	Total	Andranik Karapetyan (ARM)	369 kg	Roman Chepik (RUS)	347 kg	Ihor Konotop (UKR)	339 kg
– 94 kg	Snatch	Anton Pliesnoi (GEO)	172 kg	Pavlo Zakashevskyi (UKR)	161 kg	Hakob Mkrtchyan (ARM)	160 kg
– 94 kg	Clean & Jerk	Hakob Mkrtchyan (ARM)	208 kg	Siarhei Haranin (BLR)	197 kg	Illia Kulikov (UKR)	196 kg
– 94 kg	Total	Hakob Mkrtchyan (ARM)	368 kg	Anton Pliesnoi (GEO)	367 kg	Siarhei Haranin (BLR)	355 kg
– 105 kg	Snatch	Dato Khetsuriani (GEO)	174 kg	Fedor Petrov (RUS)	170 kg	Volodymyr Hoza (UKR)	166 kg
– 105 kg	Clean & Jerk	Fedor Petrov (RUS)	208 kg	Dato Khetsuriani (GEO)	201 kg	Bohdan Buriachek (UKR)	201 kg
– 105 kg	Total	Fedor Petrov (RUS)	378 kg	Dato Khetsuriani (GEO)	375 kg	Volodymyr Hoza (UKR)	366 kg
+ 105 kg	Snatch	Simon Martirosyan (ARM)	190 kg	Giorgi Chkheidze (GEO)	183 kg	Bakari Turmanidze (GEO)	182 kg
+ 105 kg	Clean & Jerk	Simon Martirosyan (ARM)	230 kg	Giorgi Chkheidze (GEO)	225 kg	Tamaš Kajdoči (SRB)	223 kg
+ 105 kg	Total	Simon Martirosyan (ARM)	420 kg	Giorgi Chkheidze (GEO)	408 kg	Bakari Turmanidze (GEO)	399 kg

==== Women ====
Event		Gold		Silver		Bronze	
– 48 kg	Snatch	Anhelina Lomachynska (UKR)	73 kg	Alessandra Pagliaro (ITA)	72 kg	Iana Mokhina (RUS)	71 kg
– 48 kg	Clean & Jerk	Olga Fernández (ESP)	89 kg	Iana Mokhina (RUS)	88 kg	Anhelina Lomachynska (UKR)	87 kg
– 48 kg	Total	Anhelina Lomachynska (UKR)	160 kg	Iana Mokhina (RUS)	159 kg	Alessandra Pagliaro (ITA)	156 kg
– 53 kg	Snatch	Sümeyye Kentli (TUR)	83 kg	Liudmila Psyshchanitsa (BLR)	82 kg	Irina Baymulkina (RUS)	80 kg
– 53 kg	Clean & Jerk	Sümeyye Kentli (TUR)	106 kg	Liudmila Psyshchanitsa (BLR)	105 kg	Irina Baymulkina (RUS)	98 kg
– 53 kg	Total	Sümeyye Kentli (TUR)	189 kg	Liudmila Psyshchanitsa (BLR)	187 kg	Irina Baymulkina (RUS)	178 kg
– 58 kg	Snatch	Olga Te (RUS)	98 kg	Veronika Ivasiuk (UKR)	83 kg	Natalia Maria Farina (ITA)	82 kg
– 58 kg	Clean & Jerk	Olga Te (RUS)	110 kg	Darya Tseveleva (BLR)	103 kg	Natalia Maria Farina (ITA)	96 kg
– 58 kg	Total	Olga Te (RUS)	208 kg	Darya Tseveleva (BLR)	183 kg	Natalia Maria Farina (ITA)	178 kg
– 63 kg	Snatch	Florina Sorina Hulpan (ROU)	98 kg	Aleksandra Kozlova (RUS)	97 kg	Izabella Yaylyan (ARM)	94 kg
– 63 kg	Clean & Jerk	Florina Sorina Hulpan (ROU)	120 kg	Aleksandra Kozlova (RUS)	117 kg	Izabella Yaylyan (ARM)	110 kg
– 63 kg	Total	Florina Sorina Hulpan (ROU)	218 kg	Aleksandra Kozlova (RUS)	214 kg	Izabella Yaylyan (ARM)	204 kg
– 69 kg	Snatch	Ani Sargsian (RUS)	95 kg	Anastasiya Mikhalenka (BLR)	93 kg	Ecaterina Tretiacova (MDA)	91 kg
– 69 kg	Clean & Jerk	Anastasiya Mikhalenka (BLR)	123 kg	Ani Sargsian (RUS)	120 kg	Duygu Aynacı (TUR)	115 kg
– 69 kg	Total	Anastasiya Mikhalenka (BLR)	216 kg	Ani Sargsian (RUS)	215 kg	Duygu Aynacı (TUR)	205 kg
– 75 kg	Snatch	Iryna Dekha (UKR)	102 kg	Mariya Petrova (RUS)	101 kg	Jolanta Wiór (POL)	96 kg
– 75 kg	Clean & Jerk	Mariya Petrova (RUS)	130 kg	Iryna Dekha (UKR)	121 kg	Elena Cîlcic (MDA)	119 kg
– 75 kg	Total	Mariya Petrova (RUS)	231 kg	Iryna Dekha (UKR)	223 kg	Elena Cîlcic (MDA)	212 kg
– 90 kg	Snatch	Tatev Hakobyan (ARM)	105 kg	Anastasiia Hotfrid (GEO)	100 kg	Kinga Kaczmarczyk (POL)	93 kg
– 90 kg	Clean & Jerk	Tatev Hakobyan (ARM)	129 kg	Kinga Kaczmarczyk (POL)	128 kg	Anastasiia Hotfrid (GEO)	120 kg
– 90 kg	Total	Tatev Hakobyan (ARM)	234 kg	Kinga Kaczmarczyk (POL)	221 kg	Anastasiia Hotfrid (GEO)	220 kg
+ 90 kg	Snatch	Anastasiya Lysenko (UKR)	117 kg	Natalia Shchegoleva (RUS)	90 kg	Dianą Flak (POL)	88 kg
+ 90 kg	Clean & Jerk	Anastasiya Lysenko (UKR)	148 kg	Natalia Shchegoleva (RUS)	115 kg	Zuzanna Majewska (POL)	113 kg
+ 90 kg	Total	Anastasiya Lysenko (UKR)	265 kg	Natalia Shchegoleva (RUS)	205 kg	Zuzanna Majewska (POL)	199 kg

== Medal table ==
Ranking by Big (Total result) medals

* Host nation (Poland)

Rank	Nation	Gold	Silver	Bronze	Total
1	Russia (RUS)	5	9	5	19
2	Belarus (BLR)	5	2	3	10
3	Armenia (ARM)	4	5	2	11
4	Turkey (TUR)	3	3	5	11
5	Georgia (GEO)	3	3	2	8
6	Ukraine (UKR)	3	2	5	10
7	Romania (ROU)	3	1	1	5
8	Bulgaria (BUL)	2	0	0	2
9	Italy (ITA)	1	1	4	6
10	Poland (POL)*	1	1	3	5
11	Latvia (LAT)	1	1	0	2
12	Azerbaijan (AZE)	1	0	0	1
13	Austria (AUT)	0	2	0	2
14	Moldova (MDA)	0	1	1	2
15	Spain (ESP)	0	1	0	1
16	Israel (ISR)	0	0	1	1
Totals (16 entries)		32	32	32	96

Ranking by all medals: Big (Total result) and Small (Snatch and Clean & Jerk)

* Host nation (Poland)

Rank	Nation	Gold	Silver	Bronze	Total
1	Russia (RUS)	15	25	13	53
2	Armenia (ARM)	13	10	11	34
3	Belarus (BLR)	12	10	5	27
4	Turkey (TUR)	10	9	14	33
5	Georgia (GEO)	9	10	4	23
6	Ukraine (UKR)	8	7	13	28
7	Romania (ROU)	8	4	8	20
8	Italy (ITA)	5	3	8	16
9	Bulgaria (BUL)	5	1	0	6
10	Latvia (LAT)	4	2	0	6
11	Poland (POL)*	2	4	12	18
12	Azerbaijan (AZE)	2	3	0	5
13	Austria (AUT)	1	4	0	5
14	Spain (ESP)	1	2	1	4
15	Israel (ISR)	1	0	2	3
16	Moldova (MDA)	0	2	3	5
17	France (FRA)	0	0	1	1
17	Serbia (SRB)	0	0	1	1
Totals (18 entries)		96	96	96	288

== Points ==
=== Juniors ===
Rank	Men's				Women's			
Rank	Athlete	Body Weight	Total	Points	Athlete	Body Weight	Total	Points
1	Yauheni Tsikhantsou (BLR)	93.55	385	438.1	Rebeka Koha (LAT)	59.95	220	297.4
2	Ritvars Suharevs (LAT)	84.35	360	429.0	Kristina Novitskaia (RUS)	53.00	191	280.8
3	Revaz Davitadze (GEO)	84.85	361	429.0	Ayşegül Çakın (TUR)	57.80	198	274.1
4	Irakli Chkheidze (GEO)	102.00	386	425.0	Raluca Andreea Olaru (ROU)	57.55	197	273.5
5	Eduard Ziaziulin (BLR)	135.00	413	422.4	Nuray Levent (TUR)	62.20	207	273.4
6	Zulfat Garaev (RUS)	61.15	290	416.9	Andreea Penciu (ROU)	57.60	196	272.0
7	Henadz Laptseu (BLR)	61.95	291	414.7	Kamila Konotop (UKR)	52.40	182	269.8
8	Karen Avagyan (ARM)	89.90	358	414.3	Suizanna Valodzka (BLR)	62.15	201	265.6
9	Varazdat Lalayan (ARM)	139.50	406	413.1	Lucrezia Magistris (ITA)	52.85	179	263.7
10	Samvel Babakyan (ARM)	92.75	361	412.3	Dayana Dimitrova (BUL)	47.85	164	260.6

=== Under-23 ===
Rank	Men's				Women's			
Rank	Athlete	Body Weight	Total	Points	Athlete	Body Weight	Total	Points
1	Simon Martirosyan (ARM)	114.30	420	446.0	Florina Sorina Hulpan (ROU)	61.10	218	291.2
2	Andranik Karapetyan (ARM)	83.60	369	441.6	Olga Te (RUS)	57.85	208	287.8
3	Hakob Mkrtchyan (ARM)	89.95	368	425.8	Aleksandra Kozlova (RUS)	62.15	214	282.8
4	Bozhidar Andreev (BUL)	75.90	338	425.2	Anastasiya Lysenko (UKR)	103.40	265	279.5
5	Viacheslav Iarkin (RUS)	76.55	337	422.0	Sümeyye Kentli (TUR)	52.90	189	278.3
6	Giorgi Chkheidze (GEO)	130.20	408	420.1	Mariya Petrova (RUS)	74.35	231	276.4
7	Anton Pliesnoi (GEO)	93.70	367	417.4	Liudmila Psyshchanitsa (BLR)	52.95	187	275.1
8	Goga Chkheidze (GEO)	68.90	313	416.4	Izabella Yaylyan (ARM)	61.20	204	272.2
9	Roman Chepik (RUS)	84.45	347	413.3	Ani Sargsian (RUS)	67.25	215	271.2
10	Fedor Petrov (RUS)	104.70	378	412.4	Anastasiya Mikhalenka (BLR)	68.40	216	269.9

== Participating nations ==
- Albania (2)
- Armenia (16)
- Austria (3)
- Azerbaijan (16)
- Belarus (21)
- Bosnia and Herzegovina (1)
- Bulgaria (7)
- Croatia (6)
- Czech Republic (3)
- Denmark (9)
- Estonia (1)
- Finland (10)
- France (6)
- Georgia (13)
- Germany (5)
- Great Britain (8)
- Hungary (7)
- Iceland (1)
- Israel (6)
- Italy (17)
- Kosovo (4)
- Latvia (7)
- Lithuania (6)
- Moldova (11)
- Norway (2)
- Poland (32)
- Romania (15)
- Russia (32)
- Serbia (2)
- Slovakia (9)
- Slovenia (1)
- Spain (6)
- Sweden (4)
- Turkey (24)
- Ukraine (29)
