= 2017 European Junior & U23 Weightlifting Championships =

International weightlifting competition

- Venue: Ramazan Njala Sports Palace
- Location: Durrës, Albania
- Dates: 15–21 October

The 2017 European Junior & U23 Weightlifting Championships took place in Ramazan Njala Sports Palace, Durrës, Albania from 15 October to 21 October 2017.

== Medal table ==
Ranking by Big (Total result) medals

Rank	Nation	Gold	Silver	Bronze	Total
1	Armenia	6	3	1	10
2	Russia	4	8	4	16
3	Georgia	4	4	2	10
4	Ukraine	4	3	6	13
5	Romania	4	2	0	6
6	Belarus	3	4	2	9
7	Italy	3	1	0	4
8	Latvia	2	0	1	3
9	Turkey	1	4	4	9
10	Spain	1	0	2	3
11	Albania	0	1	1	2
11	Poland	0	1	1	2
13	Austria	0	1	0	1
14	Germany	0	0	2	2
15	Azerbaijan	0	0	1	1
15	Belgium	0	0	1	1
15	Bulgaria	0	0	1	1
15	Great Britain	0	0	1	1
15	Moldova	0	0	1	1
15	Serbia	0	0	1	1
Totals (20 entries)		32	32	32	96

Ranking by all medals: Big (Total result) and Small (Snatch and Clean & Jerk)

Rank	Nation	Gold	Silver	Bronze	Total
1	Armenia	18	8	6	32
2	Ukraine	14	9	18	41
3	Georgia	13	8	6	27
4	Russia	11	27	10	48
5	Romania	11	4	4	19
6	Italy	9	2	0	11
7	Belarus	8	12	9	29
8	Latvia	5	1	2	8
9	Turkey	3	13	10	26
10	Spain	3	3	2	8
11	Hungary	1	0	0	1
12	Poland	0	4	3	7
13	Austria	0	2	2	4
14	Albania	0	2	1	3
15	Germany	0	1	5	6
16	Azerbaijan	0	0	4	4
17	Belgium	0	0	3	3
17	Great Britain	0	0	3	3
17	Moldova	0	0	3	3
20	Bulgaria	0	0	2	2
20	Serbia	0	0	2	2
22	Slovakia	0	0	1	1
Totals (22 entries)		96	96	96	288

== Team ranking ==
Men Junior

Rank	Team	Points
1	Belarus	544
2	Ukraine	479
3	Russia	478
4	Turkey	365
5	Georgia	363
6	Armenia	362

Women Junior

Rank	Team	Points
1	Ukraine	570
2	Russia	551
3	Turkey	543
4	Poland	487
5	Belarus	442
6	Spain	340

Men Under-23

Rank	Team	Points
1	Russia	550
2	Georgia	491
3	Ukraine	378
4	Armenia	377
5	Turkey	351
6	Belarus	297

Women Under-23

Rank	Team	Points
1	Russia	599
2	Romania	471
3	Belarus	402
4	Ukraine	227
5	Denmark	211
6	Poland	191

== Medal overview ==
=== Juniors ===
Men

Event		Gold		Silver		Bronze	
– 56 kg	Snatch	Caner Toptaş (TUR)	110 kg	Dmytro Voronovskyi (UKR)	109 kg	Pavlo Zalipskyi (UKR)	108 kg
– 56 kg	Clean & Jerk	Pavlo Zalipskyi (UKR)	130 kg	Dmytro Voronovskyi (UKR)	130 kg	Leon Schedler (GER)	129 kg
– 56 kg	Total	Dmytro Voronovskyi (UKR)	239 kg	Caner Toptaş (TUR)	238 kg	Pavlo Zalipskyi (UKR)	238 kg
– 62 kg	Snatch	Henadz Laptseu (BLR)	132 kg	Arberi Cerciz (ALB)	131 kg	Kanan Khalilov (AZE)	123 kg
– 62 kg	Clean & Jerk	Henadz Laptseu (BLR)	158 kg	Jon Mau (GER)	154 kg	Mahammad Mammadli (AZE)	148 kg
– 62 kg	Total	Henadz Laptseu (BLR)	290 kg	Arberi Cerciz (ALB)	274 kg	Jon Mau (GER)	264 kg
– 69 kg	Snatch	Ilya Zharnouski (BLR)	141 kg	Mirko Zanni (ITA)	137 kg	Hrayr Hovhannisyan (ARM)	135 kg
– 69 kg	Clean & Jerk	Mirko Zanni (ITA)	165 kg	Muhammed Furkan Özbek (TUR)	162 kg	Ilya Zharnouski (BLR)	160 kg
– 69 kg	Total	Mirko Zanni (ITA)	302 kg	Ilya Zharnouski (BLR)	301 kg	Muhammed Furkan Özbek (TUR)	297 kg
– 77 kg	Snatch	Ritvars Suharevs (LAT)	154 kg	Viacheslav Iarkin (RUS)	148 kg	Celil Erdoğdu (TUR)	146 kg
– 77 kg	Clean & Jerk	Viacheslav Iarkin (RUS)	184 kg	Ritvars Suharevs (LAT)	179 kg	Celil Erdoğdu (TUR)	177 kg
– 77 kg	Total	Ritvars Suharevs (LAT)	333 kg	Viacheslav Iarkin (RUS)	332 kg	Celil Erdoğdu (TUR)	323 kg
– 85 kg	Snatch	Revaz Davitadze (GEO)	165 kg	Davit Hovhannisyan (ARM)	158 kg	Karen Avagyan (ARM)	156 kg
– 85 kg	Clean & Jerk	Revaz Davitadze (GEO)	188 kg	Illia Kulikov (UKR)	186 kg	Igor Obukhov (UKR)	186 kg
– 85 kg	Total	Revaz Davitadze (GEO)	353 kg	Davit Hovhannisyan (ARM)	343 kg	Illia Kulikov (UKR)	340 kg
– 94 kg	Snatch	Kyryl Pyrohov (UKR)	175 kg	Yauheni Tsikhantsou (BLR)	168 kg	Huseyn Ismayilov (AZE)	158 kg
– 94 kg	Clean & Jerk	Kyryl Pyrohov (UKR)	201 kg	Yauheni Tsikhantsou (BLR)	200 kg	David Fischer (AUT)	189 kg
– 94 kg	Total	Kyryl Pyrohov (UKR)	376 kg	Yauheni Tsikhantsou (BLR)	368 kg	Huseyn Ismayilov (AZE)	346 kg
– 105 kg	Snatch	Dato Khetsuriani (GEO)	173 kg	Nikolay Panayotidi (RUS)	168 kg	Samvel Gasparyan (ARM)	167 kg
– 105 kg	Clean & Jerk	Samvel Gasparyan (ARM)	207 kg	Irakli Chkheidze (GEO)	206 kg	Dato Khetsuriani (GEO)	204 kg
– 105 kg	Total	Dato Khetsuriani (GEO)	377 kg	Samvel Gasparyan (ARM)	374 kg	Irakli Chkheidze (GEO)	370 kg
+ 105 kg	Snatch	Simon Martirosyan (ARM)	197 kg	Giorgi Chkheidze (GEO)	185 kg	Eduard Ziaziulin (BLR)	180 kg
+ 105 kg	Clean & Jerk	Simon Martirosyan (ARM)	236 kg	Giorgi Chkheidze (GEO)	231 kg	Tamaš Kajdoči (SRB)	217 kg
+ 105 kg	Total	Simon Martirosyan (ARM)	433 kg	Giorgi Chkheidze (GEO)	416 kg	Tamaš Kajdoči (SRB)	391 kg

Women

Event		Gold		Silver		Bronze	
– 48 kg	Snatch	Alessandra Pagliaro (ITA)	72 kg	Ayşe Doğan (TUR)	71 kg	Gamze Karakol (TUR)	68 kg
– 48 kg	Clean & Jerk	Alessandra Pagliaro (ITA)	88 kg	Gamze Karakol (TUR)	87 kg	Sylwia Oleskiewicz (POL)	83 kg
– 48 kg	Total	Alessandra Pagliaro (ITA)	160 kg	Gamze Karakol (TUR)	155 kg	Ayşe Doğan (TUR)	152 kg
– 53 kg	Snatch	Mariia Hanhur (UKR)	83 kg	Kristina Novitskaia (RUS)	82 kg	Liudmila Pankova (BLR)	81 kg
– 53 kg	Clean & Jerk	Liudmila Pankova (BLR)	105 kg	Mariia Hanhur (UKR)	102 kg	Kristina Novitskaia (RUS)	101 kg
– 53 kg	Total	Liudmila Pankova (BLR)	186 kg	Mariia Hanhur (UKR)	185 kg	Kristina Novitskaia (RUS)	183 kg
– 53 kg	Snatch	Rebeka Koha (LAT)	98 kg	Ayşegül Çakın (TUR)	82 kg	Olha Pikash (UKR)	77 kg
– 53 kg	Clean & Jerk	Rebeka Koha (LAT)	115 kg	Ayşegül Çakın (TUR)	105 kg	Olha Pikash (UKR)	100 kg
– 53 kg	Total	Rebeka Koha (LAT)	213 kg	Ayşegül Çakın (TUR)	187 kg	Olha Pikash (UKR)	177 kg
– 63 kg	Snatch	Mariia Tymoshchuk (UKR)	91 kg	Nuray Levent (TUR)	90 kg	Florina Hulpan (ROU)	90 kg
– 63 kg	Clean & Jerk	Florina Hulpan (ROU)	115 kg	Nuray Levent (TUR)	114 kg	Mariia Tymoshchuk (UKR)	109 kg
– 63 kg	Total	Florina Hulpan (ROU)	205 kg	Nuray Levent (TUR)	204 kg	Mariia Tymoshchuk (UKR)	200 kg
– 69 kg	Snatch	Aleksandra Kozlova (RUS)	97 kg	Hanna Panova (UKR)	96 kg	Kseniia Marushka (BLR)	88 kg
– 69 kg	Clean & Jerk	Ilia Hernández (ESP)	116 kg	Aleksandra Kozlova (RUS)	115 kg	Hanna Panova (UKR)	114 kg
– 69 kg	Total	Aleksandra Kozlova (RUS)	212 kg	Hanna Panova (UKR)	210 kg	Ilia Hernández (ESP)	201 kg
– 75 kg	Snatch	Sona Poghosyan (ARM)	97 kg	Maria Tretyakova (RUS)	95 kg	Alona Shevkoplias (UKR)	94 kg
– 75 kg	Clean & Jerk	Sona Poghosyan (ARM)	130 kg	Tatiana Tydyyakova (RUS)	112 kg	Nikola Senicova (SVK)	110 kg
– 75 kg	Total	Sona Poghosyan (ARM)	227 kg	Maria Tretyakova (RUS)	204 kg	Alona Shevkoplias (UKR)	202 kg
– 90 kg	Snatch	Anastasiia Shyshanova (UKR)	103 kg	Sarah Fischer (AUT)	99 kg	Anastasiia Nemtseva (RUS)	96 kg
– 90 kg	Clean & Jerk	Anastasiia Shyshanova (UKR)	122 kg	Kinga Kaczmarczyk (POL)	121 kg	Sarah Fischer (AUT)	121 kg
– 90 kg	Total	Anastasiia Shyshanova (UKR)	225 kg	Sarah Fischer (AUT)	220 kg	Kinga Kaczmarczyk (POL)	217 kg
+ 90 kg	Snatch	Arpine Dalalyan (ARM)	97 kg	Magdalena Karolak (POL)	96 kg	Melike Günal (TUR)	86 kg
+ 90 kg	Clean & Jerk	Arpine Dalalyan (ARM)	131 kg	Magdalena Karolak (POL)	130 kg	Melike Günal (TUR)	110 kg
+ 90 kg	Total	Arpine Dalalyan (ARM)	228 kg	Magdalena Karolak (POL)	226 kg	Melike Günal (TUR)	196 kg

=== Under-23 ===
Men

Event		Gold		Silver		Bronze	
– 56 kg	Snatch	Mirco Scarantino (ITA)	115 kg	Muammer Sahin (TUR)	114 kg	Ilie Ciotoiu (ROU)	113 kg
– 56 kg	Clean & Jerk	Mirco Scarantino (ITA)	143 kg	Ilie Ciotoiu (ROU)	142 kg	Goderdzi Berdelidze (GEO)	135 kg
– 56 kg	Total	Mirco Scarantino (ITA)	258 kg	Ilie Ciotoiu (ROU)	255 kg	Goderdzi Berdelidze (GEO)	246 kg
– 62 kg	Snatch	Shota Mishvelidze (GEO)	134 kg	Ramini Shamilishvili (GEO)	124 kg	Yaroslav Zabolotnyi (UKR)	115 kg
– 62 kg	Clean & Jerk	Shota Mishvelidze (GEO)	153 kg	Ferdi Hardal (TUR)	150 kg	Ramini Shamilishvili (GEO)	146 kg
– 62 kg	Total	Shota Mishvelidze (GEO)	287 kg	Ramini Shamilishvili (GEO)	270 kg	Romario Avdiraj (ALB)	257 kg
– 69 kg	Snatch	Ahmet Turan Okyay (TUR)	141 kg	David Sánchez (ESP)	137 kg	Goga Chkheidze (GEO)	134 kg
– 69 kg	Clean & Jerk	Goga Chkheidze (GEO)	174 kg	David Sánchez (ESP)	170 kg	Ahmet Turan Okyay (TUR)	170 kg
– 69 kg	Total	Ahmet Turan Okyay (TUR)	311 kg	Goga Chkheidze (GEO)	308 kg	David Sánchez (ESP)	307 kg
– 77 kg	Snatch	Sergei Petrov (RUS)	150 kg	Artsiom Shahau (BLR)	149 kg	Doru Stoian (ROU)	145 kg
– 77 kg	Clean & Jerk	Sergei Petrov (RUS)	182 kg	Artsiom Shahau (BLR)	180 kg	Zhorzh Yeghikyan (ARM)	175 kg
– 77 kg	Total	Sergei Petrov (RUS)	332 kg	Artsiom Shahau (BLR)	329 kg	Razmik Unanyan (RUS)	317 kg
– 85 kg	Snatch	Andranik Karapetyan (ARM)	170 kg	Maksim Mudreuski (BLR)	161 kg	Viktor Getts (RUS)	159 kg
– 85 kg	Clean & Jerk	Antonino Pizzolato (ITA)	196 kg	Andranik Karapetyan (ARM)	190 kg	Maksim Mudreuski (BLR)	190 kg
– 85 kg	Total	Andranik Karapetyan (ARM)	360 kg	Antonino Pizzolato (ITA)	352 kg	Maksim Mudreuski (BLR)	351 kg
– 94 kg	Snatch	Karush Ghukasyan (ARM)	162 kg	Georgii Kuptsov (RUS)	161 kg	Bartlomiej Barth (POL)	150 kg
– 94 kg	Clean & Jerk	Karush Ghukasyan (ARM)	197 kg	Georgii Kuptsov (RUS)	196 kg	Vadims Kozevnikovs (LAT)	194 kg
– 94 kg	Total	Karush Ghukasyan (ARM)	359 kg	Georgii Kuptsov (RUS)	357 kg	Vadims Kozevnikovs (LAT)	339 kg
– 105 kg	Snatch	Longinoz Bregvadze (GEO)	176 kg	Marcos Ruiz (ESP)	175 kg	Bohdan Buriachek (UKR)	167 kg
– 105 kg	Clean & Jerk	Marcos Ruiz (ESP)	203 kg	Fedor Petrov (RUS)	202 kg	Bohdan Buriachek (UKR)	199 kg
– 105 kg	Total	Marcos Ruiz (ESP)	378 kg	Longinoz Bregvadze (GEO)	375 kg	Bohdan Buriachek (UKR)	366 kg
+ 105 kg	Snatch	Gor Minasyan (ARM)	200 kg	Leonid Kubyshkovskyi (UKR)	184 kg	Antoniy Savchuk (RUS)	183 kg
+ 105 kg	Clean & Jerk	Gor Minasyan (ARM)	220 kg	Antoniy Savchuk (RUS)	218 kg	Aliksei Mzhachyk (BLR)	218 kg
+ 105 kg	Total	Gor Minasyan (ARM)	420 kg	Antoniy Savchuk (RUS)	401 kg	Aliksei Mzhachyk (BLR)	396 kg

Women

Event		Gold		Silver		Bronze	
– 48 kg	Snatch	Monica Csengeri (ROU)	83 kg	Iana Mokhina (RUS)	73 kg	Anhelina Lomachynska (UKR)	72 kg
– 48 kg	Clean & Jerk	Monica Csengeri (ROU)	93 kg	Iana Mokhina (RUS)	92 kg	Daniela Pandova (BUL)	88 kg
– 48 kg	Total	Monica Csengeri (ROU)	176 kg	Iana Mokhina (RUS)	165 kg	Daniela Pandova (BUL)	160 kg
– 53 kg	Snatch	Elena Andrieș (ROU)	87 kg	Svetlana Ershova (RUS)	85 kg	Irina Baymulkina (RUS)	83 kg
– 53 kg	Clean & Jerk	Svetlana Ershova (RUS)	106 kg	Irina Baymulkina (RUS)	103 kg	Elena Andrieș (ROU)	103 kg
– 53 kg	Total	Svetlana Ershova (RUS)	191 kg	Elena Andrieș (ROU)	190 kg	Irina Baymulkina (RUS)	186 kg
– 58 kg	Snatch	Veronika Ivasiuk (UKR)	92 kg	Mădălina-Bianca Molie (ROU)	91 kg	Izabella Yaylyan (ARM)	85 kg
– 58 kg	Clean & Jerk	Mădălina-Bianca Molie (ROU)	112 kg	Izabella Yaylyan (ARM)	110 kg	Veronika Ivasiuk (UKR)	110 kg
– 58 kg	Total	Mădălina-Bianca Molie (ROU)	203 kg	Veronika Ivasiuk (UKR)	202 kg	Izabella Yaylyan (ARM)	195 kg
– 63 kg	Snatch	Loredana Toma (ROU)	106 kg	Ksenia Maksimova (RUS)	100 kg	Olga Te (RUS)	92 kg
– 63 kg	Clean & Jerk	Loredana Toma (ROU)	130 kg	Ksenia Maksimova (RUS)	115 kg	Darya Tseveleva (RUS)	114 kg
– 63 kg	Total	Loredana Toma (ROU)	236 kg	Ksenia Maksimova (RUS)	215 kg	Darya Tseveleva (RUS)	206 kg
– 69 kg	Snatch	Beata Jung (HUN)	98 kg	Anastasiya Mikhalenka (BLR)	97 kg	Ecaterina Tretiacova (MDA)	96 kg
– 69 kg	Clean & Jerk	Anastasiya Mikhalenka (BLR)	125 kg	Ani Sargsian (RUS)	119 kg	Ecaterina Tretiacova (MDA)	117 kg
– 69 kg	Total	Anastasiya Mikhalenka (BLR)	222 kg	Ani Sargsian (RUS)	215 kg	Ecaterina Tretiacova (MDA)	213 kg
– 75 kg	Snatch	Mariia Petrova (RUS)	103 kg	Darya Naumava (BLR)	98 kg	Tabea Tabel (GER)	97 kg
– 75 kg	Clean & Jerk	Mariia Petrova (RUS)	133 kg	Darya Naumava (BLR)	127 kg	Tabea Tabel (GER)	119 kg
– 75 kg	Total	Mariia Petrova (RUS)	236 kg	Darya Naumava (BLR)	225 kg	Tabea Tabel (GER)	216 kg
– 90 kg	Snatch	Anastasiia Hotfrid (GEO)	123 kg	Tatev Hakobyan (ARM)	105 kg	Anna Van Bellinghen (BEL)	100 kg
– 90 kg	Clean & Jerk	Anastasiia Hotfrid (GEO)	140 kg	Tatev Hakobyan (ARM)	123 kg	Anna Van Bellinghen (BEL)	121 kg
– 90 kg	Total	Anastasiia Hotfrid (GEO)	263 kg	Tatev Hakobyan (ARM)	228 kg	Anna Van Bellinghen (BEL)	221 kg
+ 90 kg	Snatch	Anastasiya Lysenko (UKR)	124 kg U23R	Kseniia Paskhina (RUS)	107 kg	Emily Campbell (GBR)	93 kg
+ 90 kg	Clean & Jerk	Anastasiya Lysenko (UKR)	150 kg	Kseniia Paskhina (RUS)	140 kg	Emily Campbell (GBR)	130 kg
+ 90 kg	Total	Anastasiya Lysenko (UKR)	274 kg	Kseniia Paskhina (RUS)	247 kg	Emily Campbell (GBR)	223 kg
