= 2015 European Junior & U23 Weightlifting Championships =

Weightlifting competition in Lithuania

The 2015 European Junior & U23 Weightlifting Championships were held in Klaipėda, Lithuania from 3 October to 10 October 2015.

== Medal overview (juniors) ==
=== Men ===
Event		Gold		Silver		Bronze	
– 56 kg	Snatch	Mirco Scarantino (ITA)	113 kg	Oleg Musokhranov (RUS)	110 kg	Marzpet Minasyan (ARM)	107 kg
– 56 kg	Clean & Jerk	Mirco Scarantino (ITA)	136 kg	Oleg Musokhranov (RUS)	135 kg	Davit Davayan (ARM)	120 kg
– 56 kg	Total	Mirco Scarantino (ITA)	249 kg	Oleg Musokhranov (RUS)	245 kg	Marzpet Minasyan (ARM)	227 kg
– 62 kg	Snatch	Emrah Aydin (TUR)	120 kg	Ilya Zharnouski (BLR)	119 kg	Stilyan Grozdev (BUL)	118 kg
– 62 kg	Clean & Jerk	Emrah Aydin (TUR)	146 kg	Michael Di Giusto (ITA)	144 kg	Stilyan Grozdev (BUL)	143 kg
– 62 kg	Total	Emrah Aydin (TUR)	266 kg	Stilyan Grozdev (BUL)	261 kg	Allahyar Abishov (AZE)	261 kg
– 69 kg	Snatch	Ahmet Turan Okyay (TUR)	138 kg	Ritvars Suharevs (LAT)	137 kg	Mirko Zanni (ITA)	136 kg
– 69 kg	Clean & Jerk	Celil Erdogdu (TUR)	162 kg	Ahmet Turan Okyay (TUR)	162 kg	Goga Chkheidze (GEO)	161 kg
– 69 kg	Total	Ahmet Turan Okyay (TUR)	300 kg	Ritvars Suharevs (LAT)	297 kg	Celil Erdogdu (TUR)	293 kg
– 77 kg	Snatch	Doru Ilie Stoian (ROU)	146 kg	Irakli Gabritchidze (GEO)	145 kg	Roman Semin (RUS)	145 kg
– 77 kg	Clean & Jerk	Bozhidar Andreev (BUL)	176 kg	Vautard Brandon (FRA)	175 kg	Norayr Avetisyan (ARM)	175 kg
– 77 kg	Total	Bozhidar Andreev (BUL)	317 kg	Doru Ilie Stoian (ROU)	317 kg	Norayr Avetisyan (ARM)	315 kg
– 85 kg	Snatch	Antonino Pizzolato (ITA)	158 kg	Ihor Konotop (UKR)	155 kg	Junior De Jesus Santana (ESP)	146 kg
– 85 kg	Clean & Jerk	Antonino Pizzolato (ITA)	190 kg	Romain Imadouchène (FRA)	181 kg	Ihor Konotop (UKR)	181 kg
– 85 kg	Total	Antonino Pizzolato (ITA)	348 kg	Ihor Konotop (UKR)	336 kg	Romain Imadouchène (FRA)	321 kg
– 94 kg	Snatch	Karush Ghukasyan (ARM)	158 kg	Loginoz Bregvadze (GEO)	157 kg	Anton Pliesnoi (UKR)	155 kg
– 94 kg	Clean & Jerk	Samvel Gasparyan (ARM)	195 kg	Loginoz Bregvadze (GEO)	192 kg	Karush Ghukasyan (ARM)	192 kg
– 94 kg	Total	Samvel Gasparyan (ARM)	350 kg	Karush Ghukasyan (ARM)	350 kg	Loginoz Bregvadze (GEO)	349 kg
– 105 kg	Snatch	Dadash Dadashbayli (AZE)	176 kg	Giorgi Chkheidze (GEO)	164 kg	Marcos Ruiz (ESP)	160 kg
– 105 kg	Clean & Jerk	Dadash Dadashbayli (AZE)	206 kg	Nikita Solovev (RUS)	205 kg	Giorgi Chkheidze (GEO)	201 kg
– 105 kg	Total	Dadash Dadashbayli (AZE)	382 kg	Giorgi Chkheidze (GEO)	365 kg	Vladyslav Shymchenko (UKR)	347 kg
+ 105 kg	Snatch	Antoniy Savchuk (RUS)	175 kg	Iurii Akhmedianov (RUS)	168 kg	Tamas Kajdoci (SRB)	163 kg
+ 105 kg	Clean & Jerk	Antoniy Savchuk (RUS)	220 kg	Tamas Kajdoci (SRB)	210 kg	Iurii Akhmedianov (RUS)	208 kg
+ 105 kg	Total	Antoniy Savchuk (RUS)	395 kg	Iurii Akhmedianov (RUS)	376 kg	Tamas Kajdoci (SRB)	373 kg

=== Women ===
Event		Gold		Silver		Bronze	
– 48 kg	Snatch	Alena Liakhavets (BLR)	69 kg	Gamze Karakol (TUR)	69 kg	Nadiia Iefimchuk (UKR)	67 kg
– 48 kg	Clean & Jerk	Nadiia Iefimchuk (UKR)	88 kg	Gamze Karakol (TUR)	84 kg	Alena Liakhavets (BLR)	83 kg
– 48 kg	Total	Nadiia Iefimchuk (UKR)	155 kg	Gamze Karakol (TUR)	153 kg	Alena Liakhavets (BLR)	152 kg
– 53 kg	Snatch	Rebeka Koha (LAT)	85 kg	Daria Ryzhova (RUS)	75 kg	Marlena Polakowska (POL)	74 kg
– 53 kg	Clean & Jerk	Rebeka Koha (LAT)	105 kg	Atanaska Ilieva (BUL)	89 kg	Daria Ryzhova (RUS)	88 kg
– 53 kg	Total	Rebeka Koha (LAT)	190 kg	Daria Ryzhova (RUS)	163 kg	Atanaska Ilieva (BUL)	158 kg
– 58 kg	Snatch	Veronika Ivasiuk (UKR)	89 kg	Izabella Yaylyan (ARM)	88 kg	Dora Tchakounté (FRA)	86 kg
– 58 kg	Clean & Jerk	Izabella Yaylyan (ARM)	106 kg	Veronika Ivasiuk (UKR)	104 kg	Irina Baymulkina (RUS)	101 kg
– 58 kg	Total	Izabella Yaylyan (ARM)	194 kg	Veronika Ivasiuk (UKR)	193 kg	Irina Baymulkina (RUS)	186 kg
– 63 kg	Snatch	Olena Kokhanenko (UKR)	91 kg	Alona Shevkoplyas (UKR)	91 kg	Anastasiia Petrova (RUS)	90 kg
– 63 kg	Clean & Jerk	Anastasiia Petrova (RUS)	114 kg	Olena Kokhanenko (UKR)	113 kg	Mehtap Kurnaz (TUR)	108 kg
– 63 kg	Total	Anastasiia Petrova (RUS)	204 kg	Olena Kokhanenko (UKR)	204 kg	Alona Shevkoplyas (UKR)	199 kg
– 69 kg	Snatch	Florina Sorina Hulpan (ROU)	100 kg	Rebekah Tiler (GBR)	94 kg	Ani Sargsian (RUS)	93 kg
– 69 kg	Clean & Jerk	Rebekah Tiler (GBR)	125 kg	Florina Sorina Hulpan (ROU)	122 kg	Ani Sargsian (RUS)	122 kg
– 69 kg	Total	Florina Sorina Hulpan (ROU)	222 kg	Rebekah Tiler (GBR)	219 kg	Ani Sargsian (RUS)	215 kg
– 75 kg	Snatch	Mariia Petrova (RUS)	110 kg	Sona Poghosyan (ARM)	95 kg	Anastasiia Shyshanova (UKR)	93 kg
– 75 kg	Clean & Jerk	Mariia Petrova (RUS)	130 kg	Sona Poghosyan (ARM)	118 kg	Tabea Tabel (GER)	114 kg
– 75 kg	Total	Mariia Petrova (RUS)	240 kg	Sona Poghosyan (ARM)	213 kg	Tabea Tabel (GER)	206 kg
+ 75 kg	Snatch	Iryna Dekha (UKR)	108 kg	Mercy Brown (GBR)	104 kg	Alena Kolas (BLR)	93 kg
+ 75 kg	Clean & Jerk	Alena Kolas (BLR)	124 kg	Mercy Brown (GBR)	123 kg	Iryna Dekha (UKR)	118 kg
+ 75 kg	Total	Mercy Brown (GBR)	227 kg	Iryna Dekha (UKR)	226 kg	Alena Kolas (BLR)	217 kg

=== Medals table ===
Rank	Nation	Gold	Silver	Bronze	Total
1	Russia (RUS)	8	8	9	25
2	Turkey (TUR)	6	4	2	12
3	Italy (ITA)	6	1	1	8
4	Ukraine (UKR)	5	8	7	20
5	Armenia (ARM)	5	5	6	16
6	Latvia (LAT)	3	2	0	5
6	Romania (ROU)	3	2	0	5
8	Azerbaijan (AZE)	3	0	1	4
9	Great Britain (GBR)	2	4	0	6
10	Bulgaria (BUL)	2	2	3	7
11	Belarus (BLR)	2	1	4	7
12	Georgia (GEO)	0	5	3	8
13	France (FRA)	0	2	2	4
14	Serbia (SRB)	0	1	2	3
15	Germany (GER)	0	0	2	2
15	Spain (ESP)	0	0	2	2
17	Poland (POL)	0	0	1	1
Totals (17 entries)		45	45	45	135

== Medal overview (U23) ==
=== Men ===
Event		Gold		Silver		Bronze	
– 56 kg	Snatch	Josué Brachi (ESP)	117 kg	Muammer Sahin (TUR)	105 kg	Furkan Govdeli (TUR)	104 kg
– 56 kg	Clean & Jerk	Smbat Margaryan (ARM)	139 kg	Josué Brachi (ESP)	138 kg	Furkan Govdeli (TUR)	136 kg
– 56 kg	Total	Josué Brachi (ESP)	255 kg	Smbat Margaryan (ARM)	241 kg	Furkan Govdeli (TUR)	240 kg
– 62 kg	Snatch	Ramini Shamilishvili (GEO)	120 kg	Gergely Soóky (HUN)	120 kg	Emre Malakci (TUR)	110 kg
– 62 kg	Clean & Jerk	Gergely Soóky (HUN)	147 kg	Emre Buyukunlu (TUR)	146 kg	Ramini Shamilishvili (GEO)	142 kg
– 62 kg	Total	Gergely Soóky (HUN)	267 kg	Ramini Shamilishvili (GEO)	262 kg	Lewi Bar (ISR)	237 kg
– 69 kg	Snatch	Daniyar Ismayilov (TUR)	153 kg	Firidun Guliyev (AZE)	144 kg	Sergei Petrov (RUS)	143 kg
– 69 kg	Clean & Jerk	Firidun Guliyev (AZE)	184 kg	Daniyar Ismayilov (TUR)	175 kg	David Sánchez (ESP)	166 kg
– 69 kg	Total	Firidun Guliyev (AZE)	328 kg	Daniyar Ismayilov (TUR)	328 kg	Sergei Petrov (weightlifter) (RUS)	308 kg
– 77 kg	Snatch	Razmik Unanyan (RUS)	150 kg	Giorgi Lomtadze (GEO)	147 kg	Andres Mata (ESP)	145 kg
– 77 kg	Clean & Jerk	Andres Mata (ESP)	188 kg	Razmik Unanyan (RUS)	188 kg	Giorgi Lomtadze (GEO)	175 kg
– 77 kg	Total	Razmik Unanyan (RUS)	338 kg	Andres Mata (ESP)	333 kg	Giorgi Lomtadze (GEO)	322 kg
– 85 kg	Snatch	Maksim Mudreuski (BLR)	160 kg	Marin Gologan (ROU)	155 kg	Mukhamad Khibalov (RUS)	147 kg
– 85 kg	Clean & Jerk	Maksim Mudreuski (BLR)	190 kg	Marin Gologan (ROU)	185 kg	Irmantas Kačinskas (LTU)	178 kg
– 85 kg	Total	Maksim Mudreuski (BLR)	350 kg	Marin Gologan (ROU)	340 kg	Irmantas Kačinskas (LTU)	323 kg
– 94 kg	Snatch	Zygimantas Stanulis (LTU)	171 kg	Yaroslav Chernyshov (UKR)	166 kg	Georgii Kuptsov (RUS)	165 kg
– 94 kg	Clean & Jerk	Georgii Kuptsov (RUS)	200 kg	Egor Klimonov (RUS)	200 kg	Zygimantas Stanulis (LTU)	198 kg
– 94 kg	Total	Zygimantas Stanulis (LTU)	369 kg	Georgii Kuptsov (RUS)	365 kg	Egor Klimonov (RUS)	356 kg
– 105 kg	Snatch	Jaroslaw Samoraj (POL)	175 kg	Matej Kovac (SVK)	170 kg	Soslan Dzagoev (RUS)	166 kg
– 105 kg	Clean & Jerk	Matej Kovac (SVK)	216 kg	Jaroslaw Samoraj (POL)	210 kg	Soslan Dzagoev (RUS)	194 kg
– 105 kg	Total	Matej Kovac (SVK)	386 kg	Jaroslaw Samoraj (POL)	385 kg	Soslan Dzagoev (RUS)	360 kg
+ 105 kg	Snatch	Artūrs Plēsnieks (LAT)	176 kg	Oleksii Bibik (UKR)	172 kg	Przemyslaw Budek (POL)	170 kg
+ 105 kg	Clean & Jerk	Artūrs Plēsnieks (LAT)	220 kg	Przemyslaw Budek (POL)	205 kg	Tivadar Kajdocsi (SRB)	203 kg
+ 105 kg	Total	Artūrs Plēsnieks (LAT)	396 kg	Przemyslaw Budek (POL)	375 kg	Oleksii Bibik (UKR)	371 kg

=== Women ===
Event		Gold		Silver		Bronze	
– 48 kg	Snatch	Agnieszka Zacharek (POL)	70 kg	Wioleta Jastrzębska (POL)	67 kg	Daniela Pandova (BUL)	66 kg
– 48 kg	Clean & Jerk	Yuliya Asayonak (BLR)	86 kg	Daniela Pandova (BUL)	85 kg	Agnieszka Zacharek (POL)	85 kg
– 48 kg	Total	Agnieszka Zacharek (POL)	155 kg	Yuliya Asayonak (BLR)	152 kg	Daniela Pandova (BUL)	151 kg
– 53 kg	Snatch	Sema Acartürk (TUR)	80 kg	Atenery Hernández (ESP)	80 kg	Giorgia Russo (ITA)	78 kg
– 53 kg	Clean & Jerk	Aysegul Coban (TUR)	104 kg	Sema Acartürk (TUR)	103 kg	Olga Golovanova (RUS)	102 kg
– 53 kg	Total	Sema Acartürk (TUR)	183 kg	Giorgia Russo (ITA)	179 kg	Olga Golovanova (RUS)	179 kg
– 58 kg	Snatch	Mariia Lubina (RUS)	85 kg	Rabia Zengin (TUR)	85 kg	Mouna Skandi (ESP)	84 kg
– 58 kg	Clean & Jerk	Mariia Lubina (RUS)	105 kg	Mouna Skandi (ESP)	104 kg	Loredana Heghiș (ROU)	102 kg
– 58 kg	Total	Mariia Lubina (RUS)	190 kg	Mouna Skandi (ESP)	188 kg	Loredana Heghiș (ROU)	185 kg
– 63 kg	Snatch	Sarah Davies (GBR)	88 kg	Mariana Georgiana Dumitrache (ROU)	83 kg	Bianca Mihaela Ionita (ROU)	83 kg
– 63 kg	Clean & Jerk	Sarah Davies (GBR)	113 kg	Bianca Mihaela Ionita (ROU)	109 kg	Mariana Georgiana Dumitrache (ROU)	103 kg
– 63 kg	Total	Sarah Davies (GBR)	201 kg	Bianca Mihaela Ionita (ROU)	192 kg	Mariana Georgiana Dumitrache (ROU)	186 kg
– 69 kg	Snatch	Mariya Khlyan (UKR)	100 kg	Anastassiya Ibrahimli (AZE)	99 kg	Patrycja Piechowiak (POL)	94 kg
– 69 kg	Clean & Jerk	Anastassiya Ibrahimli (AZE)	127 kg	Mariya Khlyan (UKR)	125 kg	Patrycja Piechowiak (POL)	116 kg
– 69 kg	Total	Anastassiya Ibrahimli (AZE)	226 kg	Mariya Khlyan (UKR)	225 kg	Patrycja Piechowiak (POL)	210 kg
– 75 kg	Snatch	Lyaysan Makhiyanova (RUS)	110 kg	Gintare Brazaite (LTU)	96 kg	Assiya İpek (TUR)	90 kg
– 75 kg	Clean & Jerk	Lyaysan Makhiyanova (RUS)	125 kg	Hatice Demirel (TUR)	114 kg	Gintare Brazaite (LTU)	114 kg
– 75 kg	Total	Lyaysan Makhiyanova (RUS)	235 kg	Gintare Brazaite (LTU)	210 kg	Assiya İpek (TUR)	203 kg
+ 75 kg	Snatch	Andreea Aanei (ROU)	111 kg	Kseniia Paskhina (RUS)	102 kg	Aleksandra Mierzejewska (POL)	101 kg
+ 75 kg	Clean & Jerk	Andreea Aanei (ROU)	136 kg	Kseniia Paskhina (RUS)	135 kg	Anna Van Bellinghen (BEL)	128 kg
+ 75 kg	Total	Andreea Aanei (ROU)	247 kg	Kseniia Paskhina (RUS)	237 kg	Aleksandra Mierzejewska (POL)	228 kg

=== Medals table ===
Rank	Nation	Gold	Silver	Bronze	Total
1	Russia (RUS)	9	6	10	25
2	Turkey (TUR)	4	7	6	17
3	Azerbaijan (AZE)	4	2	0	6
4	Belarus (BLR)	4	1	0	5
5	Romania (ROU)	3	6	5	14
6	Poland (POL)	3	5	7	15
7	Spain (ESP)	3	5	3	11
8	Great Britain (GBR)	3	0	0	3
8	Latvia (LAT)	3	0	0	3
10	Lithuania (LTU)	2	2	4	8
11	Hungary (HUN)	2	1	0	3
11	Slovakia (SVK)	2	1	0	3
13	Ukraine (UKR)	1	4	1	6
14	Georgia (GEO)	1	2	3	6
15	Armenia (ARM)	1	1	0	2
16	Bulgaria (BUL)	0	1	2	3
17	Italy (ITA)	0	1	1	2
18	Belgium (BEL)	0	0	1	1
18	Israel (ISR)	0	0	1	1
18	Serbia (SRB)	0	0	1	1
Totals (20 entries)		45	45	45	135

== Overall medals table ==
Rank	Nation	Gold	Silver	Bronze	Total
1	Russia (RUS)	17	14	19	50
2	Turkey (TUR)	10	11	8	29
3	Azerbaijan (AZE)	7	2	1	10
4	Ukraine (UKR)	6	12	8	26
5	Romania (ROU)	6	8	5	19
6	Armenia (ARM)	6	6	6	18
7	Belarus (BLR)	6	2	4	12
8	Italy (ITA)	6	2	2	10
9	Latvia (LAT)	6	2	0	8
10	Great Britain (GBR)	5	4	0	9
11	Poland (POL)	3	5	8	16
12	Spain (ESP)	3	5	5	13
13	Bulgaria (BUL)	2	3	5	10
14	Lithuania (LTU)	2	2	4	8
15	Hungary (HUN)	2	1	0	3
15	Slovakia (SVK)	2	1	0	3
17	Georgia (GEO)	1	7	6	14
18	France (FRA)	0	2	2	4
19	Serbia (SRB)	0	1	3	4
20	Germany (GER)	0	0	2	2
21	Belgium (BEL)	0	0	1	1
21	Israel (ISR)	0	0	1	1
Totals (22 entries)		90	90	90	270
