= 2016 European Junior & U23 Weightlifting Championships =

International weightlifting competition

The 2016 European Junior & U23 Weightlifting Championships were held in Eilat, Israel from 2 December to 10 December 2016.

== Medal overview (juniors) ==
=== Men ===
Event		Gold		Silver		Bronze	
– 56 kg	Snatch	Kanan Khalilov (AZE)	110 kg	Isa Gungor (TUR)	106 kg	Dmytro Voronovskyi (UKR)	105 kg
– 56 kg	Clean & Jerk	Dmytro Voronovskyi (UKR)	128 kg	Leon Schedler (GER)	126 kg	Giorgi Dokvadze (GEO)	124 kg
– 56 kg	Total	Dmytro Voronovskyi (UKR)	233 kg	Isa Gungor (TUR)	229 kg	Kanan Khalilov (AZE)	228 kg
– 62 kg	Snatch	Stilyan Grozdev (BUL)	126 kg	Ferdi Hardal (TUR)	126 kg	Goderdzi Berdelidze (GEO)	121 kg
– 62 kg	Clean & Jerk	Stilyan Grozdev (BUL)	152 kg	Dian Pampordzhiev (BUL)	150 kg	Jon Luke Mau (GER)	148 kg
– 62 kg	Total	Stilyan Grozdev (BUL)	278 kg	Ferdi Hardal (TUR)	273 kg	Goderdzi Berdelidze (GEO)	263 kg
– 69 kg	Snatch	Mirko Zanni (ITA)	142 kg	Celil Erdogdu (TUR)	141 kg	Ahmet Okyay (TUR)	139 kg
– 69 kg	Clean & Jerk	Goga Chkheidze (GEO)	170 kg	Celil Erdogdu (TUR)	169 kg	Mirko Zanni (ITA)	167 kg
– 69 kg	Total	Celil Erdogdu (TUR)	310 kg	Mirko Zanni (ITA)	309 kg	Goga Chkheidze (GEO)	304 kg
– 77 kg	Snatch	Doru Stoian (ROU)	150 kg	Ritvars Suharevs (LAT)	149 kg	Davit Hovhannisyan (ARM)	149 kg
– 77 kg	Clean & Jerk	Davit Hovhannisyan (ARM)	177 kg	Ritvars Suharevs (LAT)	176 kg	Doru Stoian (ROU)	175 kg
– 77 kg	Total	Davit Hovhannisyan (ARM)	326 kg	Ritvars Suharevs (LAT)	325 kg	Doru Stoian (ROU)	325 kg
– 85 kg	Snatch	Kyryl Pyrohov (UKR)	158 kg	Revaz Davitadze (GEO)	157 kg	Antonino Pizzolato (ITA)	157 kg
– 85 kg	Clean & Jerk	Hakob Mkrtchyan (ARM)	190 kg	Igor Obukhov (UKR)	185 kg	Antonino Pizzolato (ITA)	185 kg
– 85 kg	Total	Antonino Pizzolato (ITA)	342 kg	Revaz Davitadze (GEO)	340 kg	Kyryl Pyrohov (UKR)	337 kg
– 94 kg	Snatch	Volodymyr Hoza (UKR)	172 kg	Eduard Chuikov (RUS)	158 kg	Bartlomiej Barth (POL)	154 kg
– 94 kg	Clean & Jerk	Volodymyr Hoza (UKR)	197 kg	Samvel Gasparyan (ARM)	196 kg	Eduard Chuikov (RUS)	195 kg
– 94 kg	Total	Volodymyr Hoza (UKR)	369 kg	Eduard Chuikov (RUS)	353 kg	Samvel Gasparyan (ARM)	346 kg
– 105 kg	Snatch	Marcos Ruiz (ESP)	175 kg	Dato Khetsuriani (GEO)	171 kg	Nikita Solovev (RUS)	170 kg
– 105 kg	Clean & Jerk	Marcos Ruiz (ESP)	206 kg	Dato Khetsuriani (GEO)	206 kg	Giorgi Chkheidze (GEO)	203 kg
– 105 kg	Total	Marcos Ruiz (ESP)	381 kg	Dato Khetsuriani (GEO)	377 kg	Giorgi Chkheidze (GEO)	372 kg
+ 105 kg	Snatch	Simon Martirosyan (ARM)	180 kg	Tamaš Kajdoči (SRB)	173 kg	Maksym Kobets (UKR)	171 kg
+ 105 kg	Clean & Jerk	Tamaš Kajdoči (SRB)	225 kg	Simon Martirosyan (ARM)	220 kg	Illia Lebedzeu (BLR)	206 kg
+ 105 kg	Total	Simon Martirosyan (ARM)	400 kg	Tamaš Kajdoči (SRB)	398 kg	Illia Lebedzeu (BLR)	377 kg

=== Women ===
Event		Gold		Silver		Bronze	
– 48 kg	Snatch	Monica-Suneta Csengeri (ROU)	78 kg	Iana Mokhina (RUS)	71 kg	Nadezhda Nguen (BUL)	70 kg
– 48 kg	Clean & Jerk	Iana Mokhina (RUS)	90 kg	Monica-Suneta Csengeri (ROU)	90 kg	Gamze Karakol (TUR)	88 kg
– 48 kg	Total	Monica-Suneta Csengeri (ROU)	168 kg	Iana Mokhina (RUS)	161 kg	Gamze Karakol (TUR)	154 kg
– 53 kg	Snatch	Kristina Novitskaia (RUS)	82 kg	Krystsina Makutsevich (BLR)	76 kg	Kamila Konotop (UKR)	74 kg
– 53 kg	Clean & Jerk	Kristina Novitskaia (RUS)	105 kg	Rebekka Jacobsen (NOR)	94 kg	Kamila Konotop (UKR)	92 kg
– 53 kg	Total	Kristina Novitskaia (RUS)	187 kg	Krystsina Makutsevich (BLR)	168 kg	Kamila Konotop (UKR)	166 kg
– 58 kg	Snatch	Rebeka Koha (LAT)	94 kg	Mădălina Molie (ROU)	90 kg	Alba Sánchez (ESP)	88 kg
– 58 kg	Clean & Jerk	Alba Sánchez (ESP)	111 kg	Rebeka Koha (LAT)	110 kg	Mădălina Molie (ROU)	108 kg
– 58 kg	Total	Rebeka Koha (LAT)	204 kg	Alba Sánchez (ESP)	199 kg	Mădălina Molie (ROU)	198 kg
– 63 kg	Snatch	Florina Hulpan (ROU)	92 kg	Anastasiia Petrova (RUS)	86 kg	Aliaksandra Tsiatsiorkina (BLR)	86 kg
– 63 kg	Clean & Jerk	Florina Hulpan (ROU)	114 kg	Berfin Altun (TUR)	109 kg	Anastasiia Petrova (RUS)	105 kg
– 63 kg	Total	Florina Hulpan (ROU)	206 kg	Berfin Altun (TUR)	192 kg	Anastasiia Petrova (RUS)	191 kg
– 69 kg	Snatch	Hanna Panova (UKR)	98 kg	Ecaterina Tretiacova (MDA)	97 kg	Alona Shevkoplias (UKR)	94 kg
– 69 kg	Clean & Jerk	Hanna Panova (UKR)	119 kg	Ecaterina Tretiacova (MDA)	115 kg	Zeynep Atakan (TUR)	113 kg
– 69 kg	Total	Hanna Panova (UKR)	217 kg	Ecaterina Tretiacova (MDA)	212 kg	Alona Shevkoplias (UKR)	202 kg
– 75 kg	Snatch	Iryna Dekha (UKR)	119 kg	Tabea Tabel (GER)	97 kg	Sona Poghosyan (ARM)	96 kg
– 75 kg	Clean & Jerk	Iryna Dekha (UKR)	141 kg	Sona Poghosyan (ARM)	122 kg	Tabea Tabel (GER)	121 kg
– 75 kg	Total	Iryna Dekha (UKR)	260 kg	Sona Poghosyan (ARM)	218 kg	Tabea Tabel (GER)	218 kg
+ 75 kg	Snatch	Anastasiia Hotfrid (GEO)	118 kg	Valentyna Kisil (UKR)	110 kg	Mercy Brown (GBR)	101 kg
+ 75 kg	Clean & Jerk	Anastasiia Hotfrid (GEO)	133 kg	Mercy Brown (GBR)	132 kg	Valentyna Kisil (UKR)	128 kg
+ 75 kg	Total	Anastasiia Hotfrid (GEO)	251 kg	Valentyna Kisil (UKR)	238 kg	Mercy Brown (GBR)	233 kg

=== Medals table ===
Rank	Nation	Gold	Silver	Bronze	Total
1	Ukraine (UKR)	12	3	9	24
2	Romania (ROU)	6	2	4	12
3	Armenia (ARM)	5	4	3	12
4	Georgia (GEO)	4	5	6	15
5	Russia (RUS)	4	5	4	13
6	Spain (ESP)	4	1	1	6
7	Bulgaria (BUL)	3	1	1	5
8	Latvia (LAT)	2	4	0	6
9	Italy (ITA)	2	1	3	6
10	Turkey (TUR)	1	8	4	13
11	Serbia (SRB)	1	2	0	3
12	Azerbaijan (AZE)	1	0	1	2
13	Moldova (MDA)	0	3	0	3
14	Belarus (BLR)	0	2	3	5
14	Germany (GER)	0	2	3	5
16	Great Britain (GBR)	0	1	2	3
17	Norway (NOR)	0	1	0	1
18	Poland (POL)	0	0	1	1
Totals (18 entries)		45	45	45	135

== U23 ==
Page 101 and 103 of source:

=== Medals table ===
Rank	Nation	Gold	Silver	Bronze	Total
1	Russia (RUS)	20	12	5	37
2	Ukraine (UKR)	7	5	9	21
3	Spain (ESP)	4	2	0	6
4	Georgia (GEO)	4	1	2	7
5	Romania (ROU)	3	9	6	18
6	Bulgaria (BUL)	3	5	0	8
7	Italy (ITA)	3	0	3	6
8	Poland (POL)	1	1	6	8
9	Turkey (TUR)	0	5	4	9
10	Belarus (BLR)	0	2	1	3
11	Armenia (ARM)	0	1	3	4
12	Hungary (HUN)	0	1	0	1
12	Lithuania (LTU)	0	1	0	1
14	Belgium (BEL)	0	0	2	2
14	France (FRA)	0	0	2	2
16	Moldova (MDA)	0	0	1	1
16	Norway (NOR)	0	0	1	1
18	Azerbaijan (AZE)	0	0	0	0
18	Germany (GER)	0	0	0	0
18	Great Britain (GBR)	0	0	0	0
18	Latvia (LAT)	0	0	0	0
18	Serbia (SRB)	0	0	0	0
Totals (22 entries)		45	45	45	135

== Overall medals table ==
Rank	Nation	Gold	Silver	Bronze	Total
1	Russia (RUS)	24	17	9	50
2	Ukraine (UKR)	19	8	18	45
3	Romania (ROU)	9	11	10	30
4	Georgia (GEO)	8	6	8	22
5	Spain (ESP)	8	3	1	12
6	Bulgaria (BUL)	6	6	1	13
7	Armenia (ARM)	5	5	6	16
8	Italy (ITA)	5	1	6	12
9	Latvia (LAT)	2	4	0	6
10	Turkey (TUR)	1	13	8	22
11	Serbia (SRB)	1	2	0	3
12	Poland (POL)	1	1	7	9
13	Azerbaijan (AZE)	1	0	1	2
14	Belarus (BLR)	0	4	4	8
15	Moldova (MDA)	0	3	1	4
16	Germany (GER)	0	2	3	5
17	Great Britain (GBR)	0	1	2	3
18	Norway (NOR)	0	1	1	2
19	Hungary (HUN)	0	1	0	1
19	Lithuania (LTU)	0	1	0	1
21	Belgium (BEL)	0	0	2	2
21	France (FRA)	0	0	2	2
Totals (22 entries)		90	90	90	270
