= 2017 in weightlifting =

This article lists the main weightlifting events and their results for 2017.

== World weightlifting championships ==
- April 1 – 11: 2017 Youth World Weightlifting Championships in (Thailand) Bangkok
  - China and Kazakhstan won 3 gold medals each. China won the overall medal tally.
- June 15 – 23: 2017 Junior World Weightlifting Championships in (Japan) Tokyo
  - China won both the gold and overall medal tallies.
- November 28 – December 5: 2017 World Weightlifting Championships in (United States) Anaheim, California
  - Note: This event was scheduled for Penang, but cancelled, due to alleged domestic political issues in the nation.
  - Colombia, Iran, and Georgia won 2 gold medals each. Colombia, Iran, and Thailand won 5 overall medals each.

== Continental & regional weightlifting championships ==
- April 1 – 9: 2017 European Weightlifting Championships in Split, Croatia
  - Russia won both the gold and overall medal tallies.
- April 21 – 29: 2017 Asian Weightlifting Championships in (Turkmenistan) Ashgabat
  - China won both the gold and overall medal tallies.
- May 1 – 8: 2017 Pan American Junior Weightlifting Championships in Guayaquil
  - Colombia and Ecuador won 22 gold medals each. Colombia won the overall medal tally.
- July 20 – 27: 2017 Pan American Weightlifting Championships in (United States) Miami
  - Overall team winners: Colombia (m) / Colombia (f)
  - Men: Colombia won both the gold and overall medal tallies.
  - Women: Colombia won the gold medal tally. Colombia and Mexico won 5 overall medals each.
- July 20 – 27: 2017 African Weightlifting Championships in (Mauritius) Vacoas
  - Egypt won the gold medal tally. Algeria won the overall medal tally.
- July 22 – 30: 2017 Asian Junior and Youth Weightlifting Championships in (Nepal) Kathmandu
  - Junior: China and North Korea won 3 gold medals each. China won the overall medal tally.
  - Youth: China won the gold medal tally. Uzbekistan won the overall medal tally.
- September 3 – 9: 2017 Commonwealth and Oceania Weightlifting Championships in Gold Coast, Queensland
  - Commonwealth Senior: India won both the gold and overall medal tallies.
  - Commonwealth Junior: India won both the gold and overall medal tallies.
  - Commonwealth Youth: India won both the gold and overall medal tallies.
  - Oceania Senior: Samoa won the gold medal tally. New Zealand won the overall medal tally.
  - Oceania Junior: Nauru, New Zealand, and Samoa won 3 gold medals each. Australia won the overall medal tally.
  - Oceania Youth: Nauru won both the gold and overall medal tallies.
- September 17 – 24: 2017 Central American and Caribbean Weightlifting Championships in Guatemala City
  - Mexico and Cuba won 6 gold medals each. Mexico won the overall medal tally.
- September 23 – 30: 2017 European Youth Weightlifting Championships in (Kosovo) Pristina
  - Romania won both the gold and overall medal tallies.
- October 7 – 14: 2017 African Junior and Youth Weightlifting Championships in (Uganda) Entebbe
  - African Junior: Algeria won both the gold and overall medal tallies.
  - African Youth: Algeria won both the gold and overall medal tallies.
- October 15 – 22: 2017 European Junior & U23 Weightlifting Championships in (Albania) Durrës
  - Armenia won the gold medal tally. Russia won the overall medal tally.
- October 28 – November 4: 2017 Pan American Youth Weightlifting Championships in Palmira
  - Men: Colombia won both the gold and overall medal tallies.
  - Women: Colombia won both the gold and overall medal tallies.
- November 17 – 22: 2017 South American Weightlifting Championships in Santa Marta
  - Note: This event was part of the 2017 Bolivarian Games.
  - Colombia won the gold medal tally. Ecuador won the overall medal tally.
- December 12 – 18: 2017 South American Junior and Youth Weightlifting Championships in Lima
  - Junior: Ecuador won the gold medal tally. Ecuador and Peru won 10 overall medals each.
  - Youth: Peru won both the gold and overall medal tallies.
