= Dmytro Voronovskyi =

Ukrainian weightlifter (born 1997)

Personal information
- Native name: Дмитро Вороновський
- Born: 3 January 1997 (age 29) Zaporizhzhia, Ukraine

Sport
- Country: Ukraine
- Sport: Weightlifting
- Weight class: 55 kg
- Coached by: Oleksandr Slobodaniuk, Anatoliy Orlov
Medal record
Men's weightlifting
Representing Ukraine
European Championships
Bronze medal – third place	2021 Moscow	55 kg
Bronze medal – third place	2022 Tirana	55 kg
European Junior & U23 Championships
Gold medal – first place	2016 Eilat	Junior 56 kg
Gold medal – first place	2017 Durrës	Junior 56 kg
Gold medal – first place	2019 Bucharest	U23 56 kg
Bronze medal – third place	2018 Zamość	U23 56 kg

Dmytro Voronovskyi (Ukrainian: Дмитро Вороновський, born 3 January 1997, in Zaporizhzhia) is a Ukrainian weightlifter. He is a bronze medalist of the 2021 and 2022 European Weightlifting Championships.

== Career ==
Voronovskyi is a two-time junior and a U23 European champion.

He debuted at the senior level in 2021 when won bronze in the 55 kg category at the 2021 European Championships held in Moscow, Russia, where he lifted in total 247 kg. He participated in the 2021 World Championships in Tashkent, Uzbekistan, but there he showed worse performance than at the European championships lifting in total 236 kg and finishing 11th. The next year, he managed to repeat his success by winning another bronze medal at the 2022 European Championships held in Tirana, Albania.

== Major results ==
Year	Venue	Weight	Snatch (kg)				Clean & Jerk (kg)				Total	Rank
Year	Venue	Weight	1	2	3	Rank	1	2	3	Rank	Total	Rank
World Championships
2021	Tashkent, Uzbekistan	55 kg	105	~~108~~	~~108~~	13	128	131	~~135~~	9	236	11
European Championships
2022	Tirana, Albania	55 kg	108	~~112~~	~~112~~	5	~~133~~	134	~~140~~	3rd place, bronze medalist(s)	242	3rd place, bronze medalist(s)
2021	Moscow, Russia	55 kg	106	110	~~112~~	4	133	137	~~140~~	3rd place, bronze medalist(s)	247	3rd place, bronze medalist(s)

== Personal life ==
Voronovskyi graduated from the Zaporizhzhia National University where he studied physical education.
