= Stilyan Grozdev =

Bulgarian weightlifter (born 1999)

Personal information
- Nationality: Bulgaria
- Born: 27 July 1999 (age 26)
- Weight: 61 kg (134 lb)

Sport
- Country: Bulgaria
- Sport: Weightlifting
- Weight class: –61 kg
- Club: TSK Ruse
- Coached by: Ivan Ivanov
Medal record
European Championships
Silver medal – second place	2018 Bucharest	–62 kg
Gold medal – first place	2021 Moscow	–61 kg
European Junior & U23 Weightlifting Championships
Silver medal – second place	2015 Klaipėda	–62 kg
Gold medal – first place	2016 Eilat	–62 kg
Silver medal – second place	2019 Bucharest	–67 kg

Stilyan Rosenov Grozdev (Bulgarian: Стилиян Росенов Гроздев; born 27 July 1999) is a Bulgarian male weightlifter, most recently competing in the 67 kg division at the 2018 World Weightlifting Championships.

== Career ==
He won the silver medal at the 2018 European Weightlifting Championships in the 62 kg division.

In 2021 he competed at the 2021 European Weightlifting Championships in the 61 kg category, winning the gold in the snatch, the silver medal in the clean & jerk portion and the gold in the total with 296 kg.

== Major results ==
Year	Venue	Weight	Snatch (kg)				Clean & Jerk (kg)				Total	Rank
Year	Venue	Weight	1	2	3	Rank	1	2	3	Rank	Total	Rank
European Championships
2016	Førde, Norway	62 kg	117	121	124	6	~~145~~	145	~~149~~	9	269	7
2017	Split, Croatia	62 kg	123	126	~~128~~	6	150	154	~~158~~	3rd place, bronze medalist(s)	280	7
2018	Bucharest, Romania	62 kg	129	132	135	1st place, gold medalist(s)	152	158	~~165~~	2nd place, silver medalist(s)	293	2nd place, silver medalist(s)
2021	Moscow, Russia	61 kg	130	134	136	1st place, gold medalist(s)	~~155~~	157	160	2nd place, silver medalist(s)	296	1st place, gold medalist(s)
European Junior & U23 Weightlifting Championships
2015	Klaipėda, Lithuania	62 kg	112	116	118	3rd place, bronze medalist(s)	136	140	143	3rd place, bronze medalist(s)	261	2nd place, silver medalist(s)
2016	Eilat, Israel	62 kg	120	125	126	1st place, gold medalist(s)	147	152	~~160~~	1st place, gold medalist(s)	278	1st place, gold medalist(s)
2019	Bucharest, Romania	67 kg	130	~~134~~	135	2nd place, silver medalist(s)	160	165	167	2nd place, silver medalist(s)	302	2nd place, silver medalist(s)
International Naim Suleymanoglu Tournament
2019	Gaziantep, Turkey	67 kg	~~130~~	133	~~135~~	1st place, gold medalist(s)	157	163	~~166~~	1st place, gold medalist(s)	296	1st place, gold medalist(s)
Malta International Open
2020	Valletta, Malta	61 kg	127	~~132~~	132	1st place, gold medalist(s)	150	155	~~158~~	1st place, gold medalist(s)	287	1st place, gold medalist(s)
