= Goderdzi Berdelidze =

Georgian weightlifter (born 1996)

Personal information
- Citizenship: Georgian
- Born: 14 July 1996 (age 29)

Sport
- Country: Georgia
- Sport: Weightlifting
- Weight class: 61 kg
Medal record
Representing Georgia
European Championships
Silver medal – second place	2025 Chișinău	61 kg

Goderdzi Berdelidze (born 14 July 1996) is a Georgian weightlifter. He represented Georgia at the 2019 World Weightlifting Championships, as well as the 2018 European Weightlifting Championships.

== Results ==
- 2016 European Junior Weightlifting Championships – Men's 62 kg – 3rd place
- 2017 European U23 Weightlifting Championships – Men's 56 kg – 3rd place
- 2019 European U23 Weightlifting Championships – Men's 56 kg – 1st place
- 2018 European Weightlifting Championships § Men's 56 kg – 4th place
- 2019 World Weightlifting Championships – Men's 61 kg – 12th place
- 2022 European Weightlifting Championships § Men's 55 kg
