= Tamaš Kajdoči =

Serbian weightlifter (born 1997)

Personal information
- Native name: Тамаш Кајдочи; Kajdocsi Tamas
- Born: 21 April 1997 (age 29) Subotica, Serbia, FR Yugoslavia
- Home town: Subotica, Serbia

Sport
- Country: Serbia
- Sport: Weightlifting
- Event: +109 kg

Achievements and titles
- Personal bests: Snatch: 180 kg (2017); Clean and jerk: 226 kg (2022); Total: 403 kg (2017, 2022)
Medal record
World University Championships
Gold medal – first place	2018 Biała Podlaska	+105 kg
Youth Olympic Games
Silver medal – second place	2014 Nanjing	+85 kg
World Junior Championships
Bronze medal – third place	2016 Tbilisi	+105 kg
Bronze medal – third place	2017 Tokyo	+105 kg
European Junior Championships
Silver medal – second place	2016 Eilat	+105 kg
Bronze medal – third place	2014 Limassol	+105 kg
Bronze medal – third place	2015 Klaipėda	+105 kg
Bronze medal – third place	2017 Durrës	+105 kg
European Youth Championships
Bronze medal – third place	2014 Ciechanów	+94 kg

Tamaš Kajdoči (Serbian Cyrillic: Тамаш Кајдочи, Hungarian: Kajdocsi Tamas; born 21 April 1997) is a Serbian male weightlifter who is competing in the +109 kg category and represents Serbia in international competitions. As a junior, he won the silver medal at the 2014 Summer Youth Olympics.

== Major results ==
Year	Venue	Weight	Record (kg) / Rank		
Year	Venue	Weight	Snatch	Cl&Jerk	Total
World Championships
2017	Anaheim, United States	+105 kg	165 / 16	215 / 15	380 / 15
2018	Ashgabat, Turkmenistan	+109 kg	165 / 24	218 / 15	380 / 16
European Championships
2017	Split, Croatia	+105 kg	167 / 16	215 / 10	382 / 11
2018	Bucharest, Romania	+105 kg	170 / 8	210 / 6	380 / 6
2019	Batumi, Georgia	+109 kg	170 / 11	215 / 11	385 / 11
2021	Moscow, Russia	+109 kg	172 / 11	218 / 11	390 / 12
2022	Tirana, Albania	+109 kg	177 / 7	226 / 6	403 / 7
Summer Universiade
2017	Tapei, Taiwan	+105 kg	170	210	380 / 9
World University Championships
2018	Biała Podlaska, Poland	+105 kg	166 / (silver)	222 / (gold)	388 / (gold)
European U23 Championships
2018	Zamość, Poland	+109 kg	172 / 5	223 / (bronze)	395 / 5
Youth Olympic Games
2014	Nanjing, China	+85 kg	150 / 2	186 / 2	336 / (silver)
World Junior Championships
2014	Kazan, Russia	+105 kg	150 / 8	190 / 6	340 / 7
2015	Wrocław, Poland	+105 kg	165 / 7	202 / 5	367 / 6
2016	Tbilisi, Georgia	+105 kg	171 / (bronze)	216 / (bronze)	387 / (bronze)
2017	Tokyo, Japan	+105 kg	180 / 5	223 / (silver)	403 / (bronze)
European Junior Championships
2014	Limassol, Cyprus	+105 kg	156 / 4	191 / (bronze)	347 / (bronze)
2015	Klaipėda, Lithuania	+105 kg	163 / (bronze)	210 / (silver)	373 / (bronze)
2016	Eilat, Israel	+105 kg	173 / (silver)	225 / (gold)	398 / (silver)
2017	Durrës, Albania	+105 kg	174 / 4	217 / (bronze)	391 / (bronze)
World Youth Championships
2013	Tashkent, Uzbekistan	+94 kg	135 / 9	165 / 10	300 / 9
European Youth Championships
2013	Klaipėda, Lithuania	+94 kg	142 / 4	175 / 4	317 / 4
2014	Ciechanów, Poland	+94 kg	155 / (silver)	185 / (bronze)	340 / (bronze)
