= Eduard Ziaziulin =

Belarusian weightlifter (born 1998)

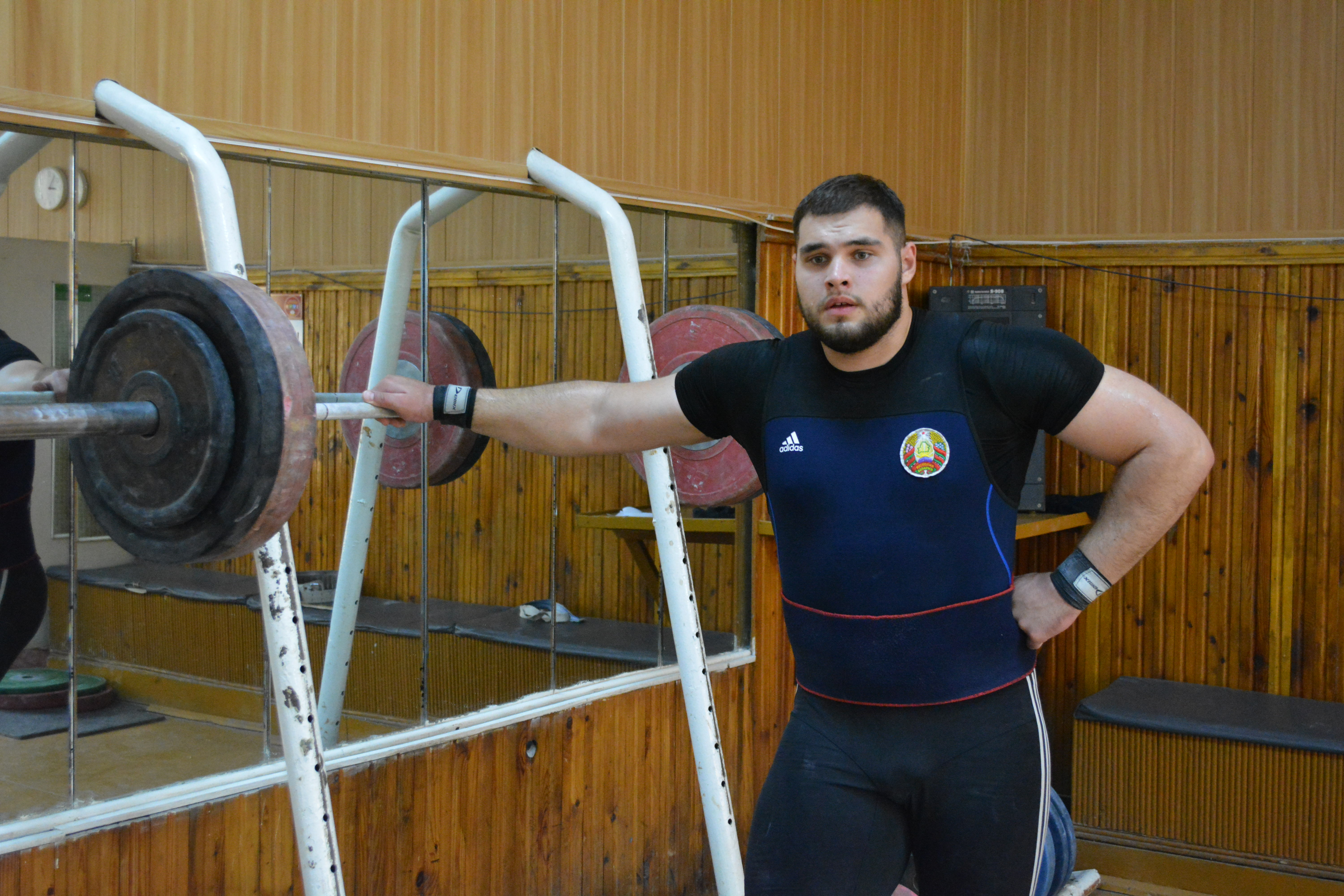

Personal information
- Nationality: Belarusian
- Born: 29 October 1998 (age 27) Mogilev, Belarus
- Weight: 142.20 kg (313 lb)

Sport
- Country: Belarus
- Sport: Weightlifting
- Event: +109 kg
- Coached by: Mikhail Barkov

Achievements and titles
- Personal bests: Snatch: 206 kg (2021); Clean and jerk: 241 kg (2021); Total: 447 kg (2021)
Medal record
Men's weightlifting
Representing Individual Neutral Athletes
European Championships
Bronze medal – third place	2024 Sofia	+109 kg

Eduard Ziaziulin (Belarusian: Эдуард Зезюлин; born 29 October 1998) is a Belarusian weightlifter, competing in the super-heavyweight category (+105 kg until 2018 and +109 kg starting in 2018 after the International Weightlifting Federation reorganized the categories).

== Career ==
Ziaziulin started as a junior weightlifter competing at the 2017 Junior World Weightlifting Championships and the 2017 European Junior & U23 Weightlifting Championships, placing fourth in both competitions. In the following European Junior & U23 Championships, he got first overall, his first first-place finish at a junior level. In the same year, he participated in his first world championships while still being a junior lifter, the 2018 World Weightlifting Championships. He finished in eighth place.

At his first European Championships the 2019 European Weightlifting Championships he got fourth, his best rank so far at the senior level. He competed at his second world championships, the 2019 World Weightlifting Championships. He finished fourth. He then participated at the 2019 European Junior & U23 Weightlifting Championships now competing as an U23 lifter, he got a second place overall finish.

At the 2021 European Weightlifting Championships, he once again finished with a fourth-place position. In the U23 level, he participated in the 2021 European Junior & U23 Weightlifting Championships, finishing second, once again being defeated by Varazdat Lalayan of Armenia. He then participated at the 2021 World Weightlifting Championships, finishing with a bronze medal in the snatch, his first minor medal at the senior level, finishing fourth overall.

He is currently suspended by the International Weightlifting Federation as the International Weightlifting Committee decided to suspend lifters from Russia and Belarus for their countries' invasion of Ukraine.

== Major results ==
Year	Venue	Weight	Snatch (kg)				Clean & Jerk (kg)				Total	Rank
Year	Venue	Weight	1	2	3	Rank	1	2	3	Rank	Total	Rank
World Championships
2018	Ashgabat, Turkmenistan	+109 kg	189	~~193~~	193	8	222	228	~~232~~	8	421	8
2019	Pattaya, Thailand	+109 kg	193	198	~~201~~	4	225	~~234~~	234	7	432	4
2021	Tashkent, Uzbekistan	+109 kg	200	206	~~210~~	3rd place, bronze medalist(s)	231	237	241	4	447	4
European Championships
2019	(Georgia (country)) Batumi, Georgia	+109 kg	191	196	~~199~~	4	~~221~~	221	227	6	423	4
2021	Moscow, Russia	+109 kg	197	~~202~~	~~202~~	4	227	~~233~~	~~233~~	7	424	4
World Junior Championships
2017	Tokyo, Japan	+105 kg	173	180	~~185~~	3rd place, bronze medalist(s)	200	210	~~215~~	5	390	4
European Junior & U23 Championships
2017	Durrës, Albania	+105 kg	173	180	~~185~~	3rd place, bronze medalist(s)	200	210	~~215~~	5	390	4
2018	Zamość, Poland	+105 kg	183	~~190~~	190	1st place, gold medalist(s)	215	223	-	1st place, gold medalist(s)	413	1st place, gold medalist(s)
2019	Bucharest, Romania	+109 kg	191	197	~~199~~	2nd place, silver medalist(s)	230	235	~~238~~	2nd place, silver medalist(s)	432	2nd place, silver medalist(s)
2021	Rovaniemi, Finland	+109 kg	195	~~201~~	201	2nd place, silver medalist(s)	220	230	~~237~~	2nd place, silver medalist(s)	431	2nd place, silver medalist(s)
