= Aliaksei Mzhachyk =

Belarusian weightlifter (1996–2021)

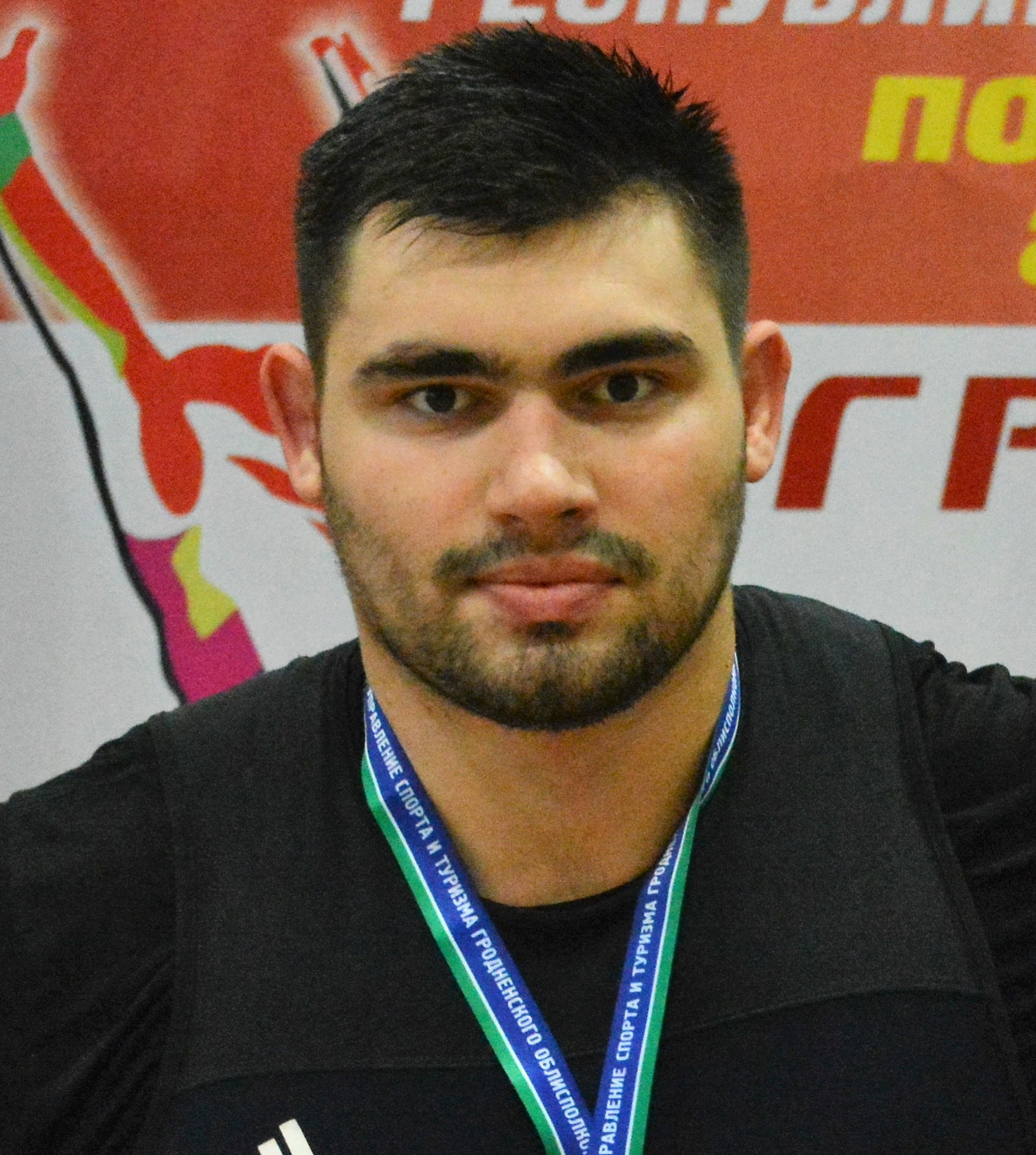
- Mzhachyk in 2019

Personal information
- Native name: Аляксей Уладзіміравіч Мжачык
- Nationality: Belarusian
- Born: 30 June 1996; Pinsk, Belarus
- Died: 1 August 2021 (aged 25); Germany
- Weight: 139.6 kg (308 lb)

Sport
- Country: Belarus
- Sport: Weightlifting
- Event: +109 kg

Aliksei Uladzimiravich Mzhachyk (Belarusian: Аляксей Уладзіміравіч Мжачык; 30 June 1996 – 1 August 2021) was a Belarusian weightlifter. He placed 12th in the men's +105 kg event at the 2016 Summer Olympics held in Rio de Janeiro, Brazil.

In age-specific categories he won the bronze medal at the 2017 European Junior & U23 Weightlifting Championships. He finished eighth at the 2017 European Weightlifting Championships and thirteenth at the 2018 World Weightlifting Championships.

Mzhachyk died in a car accident in Germany on 1 August 2021. He was 25.
