= Kamila Konotop =

Ukrainian weightlifter (born 2001)

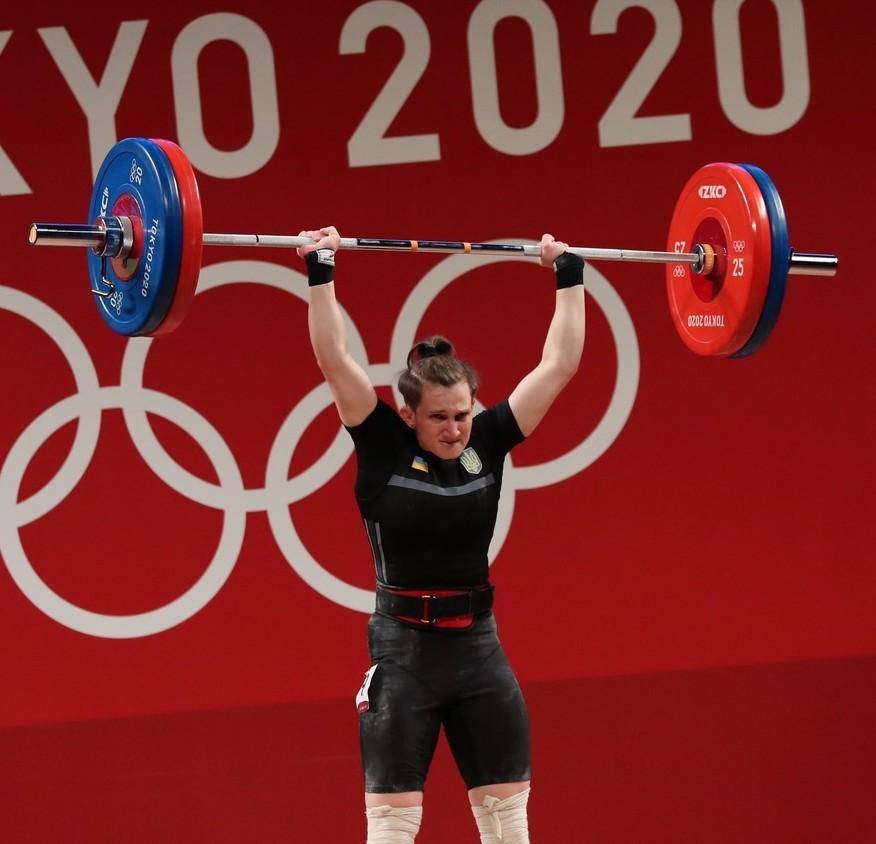
- Konotop at the 2020 Summer Olympics

Personal information
- Native name: Каміла Конотоп
- Born: 23 March 2001 (age 25) Kharkiv, Ukraine

Sport
- Country: Ukraine
- Sport: Weightlifting
- Weight class: 55 kg, 58 kg, 59 kg
Medal record
Women's weightlifting
Representing Ukraine
World Championships
Silver medal – second place	2023 Riyadh	59 kg
European Championships
Gold medal – first place	2021 Moscow	55 kg
Gold medal – first place	2023 Yerevan	59 kg
Gold medal – first place	2024 Sofia	59 kg
Gold medal – first place	2026 Batumi	58 kg
Silver medal – second place	2022 Tirana	55 kg
Junior World Championships
Gold medal – first place	2021 Tashkent	55 kg
Qatar Cup
Silver medal – second place	2019 Doha	55 kg
IWF World Cup
Silver medal – second place	2020 Rome	55 kg

Kamila Sergiivna Konotop (Ukrainian: Каміла Сергіївна Конотоп, born 23 March 2001 in Kharkiv) is a Ukrainian weightlifter. She won the silver medal in the women's 59 kg event at the 2023 World Weightlifting Championships held in Riyadh, Saudi Arabia. She is a five-time medalist, including four gold medals, at the European Weightlifting Championships. Konotop represented Ukraine at the 2020 Summer Olympics in Tokyo, Japan and the 2024 Summer Olympics in Paris, France.

== Career ==
Konotop is from Kharkiv. In 2016, at the European Junior & U23 Weightlifting Championships held in Eilat, Israel, she won the bronze medal in the women's 53 kg event. The following year, at the 2017 Youth World Weightlifting Championships in Bangkok, Thailand, she also won the bronze medal in the women's 53 kg event. In 2018, she won the silver medal in the women's junior 53 kg event at the European Junior & U23 Weightlifting Championships in Zamość, Poland. Konotop also competed in the women's 55 kg event at the 2018 World Weightlifting Championships in Ashgabat, Turkmenistan without winning a medal.

In 2019, Konotop competed in the women's 55 kg event at the World Weightlifting Championships held in Pattaya, Thailand. In that same year, she won the gold medal in the women's junior 55 kg event at the European Junior & U23 Weightlifting Championships in Bucharest, Romania. At the 6th International Qatar Cup in Doha, Qatar, she won the silver medal in the women's 55 kg event.

Konotop won the silver medal in the women's 55 kg event at the Roma 2020 World Cup in Rome, Italy. In April 2021, she secured the gold medal in her event at the European Weightlifting Championships held in Moscow, Russia. In May 2021, Konotop also won the gold medal in her event at the Junior World Weightlifting Championships held in Tashkent, Uzbekistan. She also set a new junior world record of 212 kg.

In July 2021, Konotop represented Ukraine at the 2020 Summer Olympics in Tokyo, Japan. She finished in 5th place in the women's 55 kg event with a total result of 206 kg. At the 2021 European Junior & U23 Weightlifting Championships in Rovaniemi, Finland, she won the gold medal in her event with a total result of 209 kg.

Konotop won the silver medal in her event at the 2022 European Weightlifting Championships held in Tirana, Albania. She won the gold medal in her event at the 2022 European Junior & U23 Weightlifting Championships held in Durrës, Albania. In that same year, she won the bronze medal in the women's 59 kg Snatch event at the 2022 World Weightlifting Championships held in Bogotá, Colombia.

Konotop won the gold medal in the women's 59 kg event at the 2023 European Weightlifting Championships held in Yerevan, Armenia. She also won the gold medals in the Snatch and Clean & Jerk events. She set European records in the Snatch, Clean & Jerk and Total events, with respectively results of 106 kg, 129 kg and 235 kg. In September 2023, she won the silver medal in the women's 59 kg event at the World Weightlifting Championships held in Riyadh, Saudi Arabia.

In February 2024, she won the gold medal in her event at the European Weightlifting Championships held in Sofia, Bulgaria. In August, Konotop represented Ukraine at the 2024 Summer Olympics in Paris, France. She finished in 7th place in the women's 59 kg event with a total result of 227 kg setting an Olympic record of 104 kg in the Snatch that was later beaten by other athletes. She was injured in the second Snatch attempt.

== Achievements ==
Year	Venue	Weight	Snatch (kg)				Clean & Jerk (kg)				Total	Rank
Year	Venue	Weight	1	2	3	Rank	1	2	3	Rank	Total	Rank
Summer Olympics
2021	Tokyo, Japan	55 kg	91	94	~~96~~	—N/a	106	110	112	—N/a	206	5
2024	Paris, France	59 kg	104	~~106~~	~~106~~	—N/a	123	~~129~~	~~132~~	—N/a	227	7
World Championships
2018	Ashgabat, Turkmenistan	55 kg	78	~~81~~	81	24	92	94	96	33	177	27
2019	Pattaya, Thailand	55 kg	83	86	88	12	100	104	~~106~~	18	192	16
2022	Bogotá, Colombia	59 kg	98	~~101~~	102	3rd place, bronze medalist(s)	116	119	121	8	223	6
2023	Riyadh, Saudi Arabia	59 kg	103	~~106~~	106	2nd place, silver medalist(s)	126	130	~~135~~	3rd place, bronze medalist(s)	236	2nd place, silver medalist(s)
IWF World Cup
2020	Rome, Italy	55 kg	88	~~90~~	90	2nd place, silver medalist(s)	~~103~~	103	106	5	196	2nd place, silver medalist(s)
2024	Phuket, Thailand	59 kg	—	—	—	—	—	—	—	—	—	—
European Championships
2021	Moscow, Russia	55 kg	90	93	95	1st place, gold medalist(s)	108	111	113	1st place, gold medalist(s)	208	1st place, gold medalist(s)
2022	Tirana, Albania	55 kg	~~90~~	90	94	2nd place, silver medalist(s)	107	111	113	1st place, gold medalist(s)	207	2nd place, silver medalist(s)
2023	Yerevan, Armenia	59 kg	100	104	106	1st place, gold medalist(s)	120	125	129	1st place, gold medalist(s)	235	1st place, gold medalist(s)
2024	Sofia, Bulgaria	59 kg	102	105	~~108~~	1st place, gold medalist(s)	121	125	––	1st place, gold medalist(s)	230	1st place, gold medalist(s)
