= Bozhidar Andreev =

Bulgarian weightlifter (born 1997)

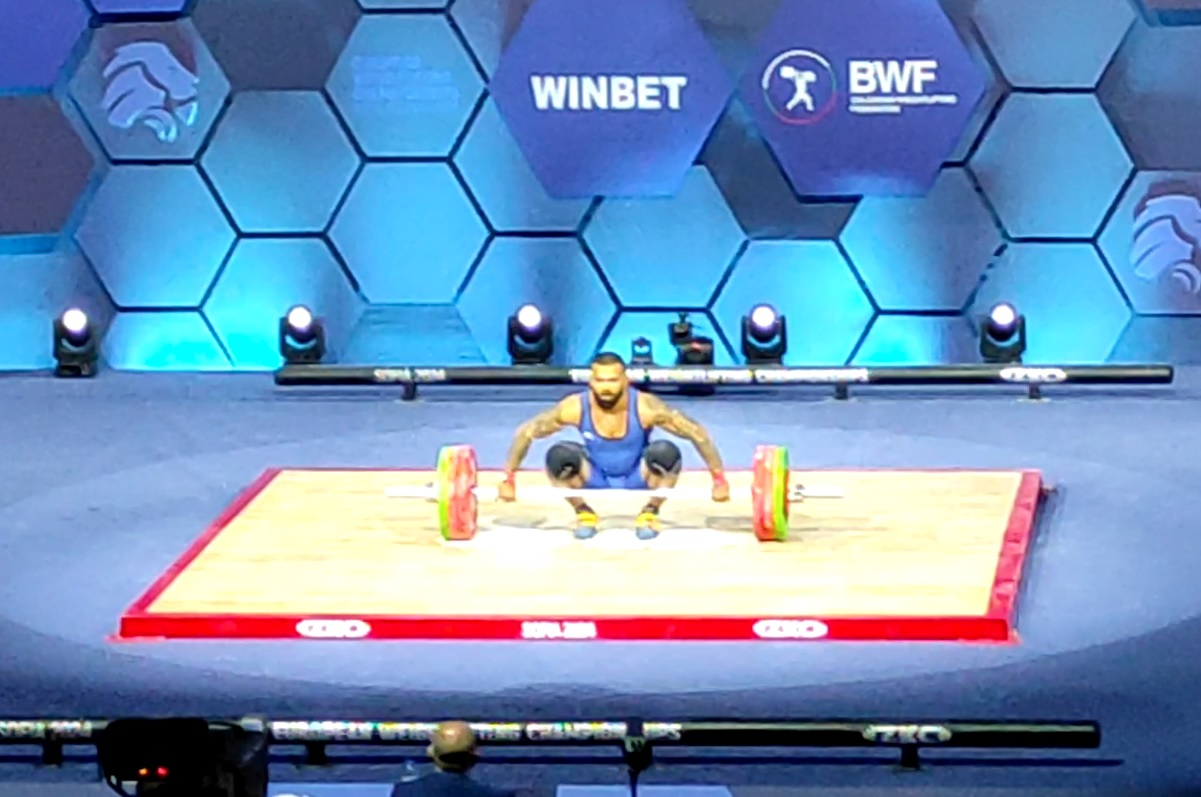
- Andreev in 2024

Personal information
- Full name: Bozhidar Dimitrov Andreev
- Born: 17 January 1997 (age 29) Topolchane, Bulgaria
- Height: 162 cm (5 ft 4 in)
- Weight: 73 kg (161 lb)

Sport
- Country: Bulgaria
- Sport: Weightlifting
- Weight class: 73 kg
- Club: TSV Heinsheim
- Coached by: Ivan Ivanov; Plamen Bratoychev

Achievements and titles
- Personal bests: Snatch: 163 kg (2019); Clean & Jerk: 198 kg (2019); Total: 361 kg (2019)
Medal record
Men's weightlifting
Representing Bulgaria
Olympic Games
Bronze medal – third place	2024 Paris	–73 kg
World Championships
Bronze medal – third place	2019 Pattaya	–73 kg
European Championships
Gold medal – first place	2019 Batumi	–73 kg
Gold medal – first place	2024 Sofia	–73 kg
Bronze medal – third place	2021 Moscow	–73 kg
Bronze medal – third place	2022 Tirana	–81 kg
Youth Olympic Games
Gold medal – first place	2014 Nanjing	–69 kg
European Youth Championships
Gold medal – first place	2013 Klaipėda	–69 kg
Gold medal – first place	2014 Ciechanów	–77 kg
European Junior & U23 Championships
Gold medal – first place	2015 Klaipėda	–77 kg
Gold medal – first place	2018 Zamość	–77 kg
Gold medal – first place	2019 Bucharest	–81 kg

Bozhidar Dimitrov Andreev (Bulgarian: Божидар Димитров Андреев; born 17 January 1997) is a Bulgarian weightlifter. He is an Olympic bronze medallist and two-time European Champion, competing in the 77 kg category until 2018 and 73 kg starting in 2018 after the International Weightlifting Federation reorganized the categories.

Andreev is currently serving a four-year competition ban set to expire in November 2029 for an anti-doping rule violation.

== Career ==
=== Olympic Games ===
In 2021, he represented Bulgaria at the 2020 Summer Olympics in Tokyo, Japan. He competed in the men's 73 kg event.

In 2024, he represented Bulgaria at the 2024 Summer Olympics in Paris, France. He won the bronze medal in the men's 73 kg event.

=== World Championships ===
In 2018, the IWF restructured the weight classes and he competed in the newly created 73 kg division at the 2018 World Weightlifting Championships finishing in ninth place in the total.

=== European Championships ===
In 2019, he competed at the 2019 European Weightlifting Championships in the 73 kg division. He won a bronze medal in the snatch and won gold medals in the clean & jerk and total. His total of 345 kg being 6 kg over the reigning European Champion Briken Calja.

=== Other competitions ===
He won the 69 kg class at the 2014 Summer Youth Olympics.

=== Suspension ===
In November 2026, Andreev was issued with a four-year ban by the International Testing Agency (ITA) backdated to November 2025 for an anti-doping rule violation after testing positive for mesterolone.

== Major results ==
Year	Venue	Weight	Snatch (kg)				Clean & Jerk (kg)				Total	Rank
Year	Venue	Weight	1	2	3	Rank	1	2	3	Rank	Total	Rank
Olympic Games
2021	Tokyo, Japan	73 kg	150	~~154~~	154	—N/a	184	~~189~~	~~190~~	—N/a	338	5
2024	Paris, France	73 kg	148	152	154	—N/a	183	187	190	—N/a	344	3rd place, bronze medalist(s)
World Championships
2018	Ashgabat, Turkmenistan	73 kg	145	150	153	8	182	~~191~~	~~191~~	11	335	9
2019	Pattaya, Thailand	73 kg	149	154	157	2nd place, silver medalist(s)	185	189	~~192~~	3rd place, bronze medalist(s)	346	3rd place, bronze medalist(s)
2022	Bogotá, Colombia	73 kg	150	~~154~~	154	2nd place, silver medalist(s)	180	184	~~190~~	7	338	4
2023	Riyadh, Saudi Arabia	81 kg	154	~~158~~	~~158~~	6	190	~~195~~	195	2nd place, silver medalist(s)	349	4
European Championships
2016	Førde, Norway	77 kg	145	150	153	5	181	187	191	4	344	4
2019	(Georgia (country)) Batumi, Georgia	73 kg	148	153	~~157~~	3rd place, bronze medalist(s)	181	187	192	1st place, gold medalist(s)	345	1st place, gold medalist(s)
2021	Moscow, Russia	73 kg	152	~~156~~	~~157~~	2nd place, silver medalist(s)	182	~~188~~	~~190~~	4	334	3rd place, bronze medalist(s)
2022	Tirana, Albania	81 kg	~~150~~	~~153~~	153	3rd place, bronze medalist(s)	185	190	~~195~~	2nd place, silver medalist(s)	343	3rd place, bronze medalist(s)
2023	Yerevan, Armenia	73 kg	147	151	~~154~~	3rd place, bronze medalist(s)	~~180~~	~~180~~	181	7	332	4
2024	Sofia, Bulgaria	73 kg	~~150~~	150	155	1st place, gold medalist(s)	181	185	193; ER	1st place, gold medalist(s)	348; ER	1st place, gold medalist(s)
Youth Olympic Games
2014	Nanjing, China	69 kg	125	130	133	—N/a	157	162	167	—N/a	300	1st place, gold medalist(s)
World Youth Championships
2012	Košice, Slovakia	62 kg	110	113	~~116~~	5	128	~~133~~	133	6	246	6
2013	Lima, Peru	69 kg	120	~~125~~	127	3rd place, bronze medalist(s)	150	~~155~~	~~155~~	7	277	6
European Youth Championships
2011	(Republic of Ireland) Dublin, Ireland	56 kg	83	87	~~90~~	10	102	106	109	7	196	8
2012	Bucharest, Romania	62 kg	108	111	113	3rd place, bronze medalist(s)	128	131	133	3rd place, bronze medalist(s)	246	3rd place, bronze medalist(s)
2013	Klaipėda, Lithuania	69 kg	120	125	130	1st place, gold medalist(s)	150	157	160	1st place, gold medalist(s)	290	1st place, gold medalist(s)
2014	Ciechanów, Poland	77 kg	130	136	138	1st place, gold medalist(s)	158	165	171	1st place, gold medalist(s)	309	1st place, gold medalist(s)
European Junior & U23 Championships
2015	Klaipėda, Lithuania	77 kg	136	141	~~144~~	4	174	176	~~182~~	1st place, gold medalist(s)	317	1st place, gold medalist(s)
2018	Zamość, Poland	77 kg	144	~~148~~	150	2nd place, silver medalist(s)	180	183	188	1st place, gold medalist(s)	338	1st place, gold medalist(s)
2019	Bucharest, Romania	81 kg	155	160	163	1st place, gold medalist(s)	190	~~196~~	198	1st place, gold medalist(s)	361	1st place, gold medalist(s)
International Naim Suleymanoglu Tournament
2019	Gaziantep, Turkey	81 kg	~~152~~	~~152~~	155	3rd place, bronze medalist(s)	186	192	197	1st place, gold medalist(s)	352	1st place, gold medalist(s)
Malta International Open
2020	Valletta, Malta	73 kg	147	151	156	1st place, gold medalist(s)	180	187	191	1st place, gold medalist(s)	347	1st place, gold medalist(s)
