= Duygu Aynacı =

Turkish weightlifter (born 1996)

Personal information
- Nationality: Turkish
- Born: June 26, 1996 (age 28)
- Height: 1.7 m (5 ft 7 in)
- Weight: 69 kg (152 lb)

Sport
- Country: Turkey
- Sport: Weightlifting
- Event(s): 69 kg, 75 kg

Duygu Aynacı (born June 26, 1996) is a Turkish weightlifter competing in the 69 kg or 75 kg divisions.

Aynacı earned a quota spot for the 2016 Summer Olympics.
