= Sema Acartürk =

Turkish weightlifter (born 1993)

Sema Acarturk
Personal information
- Born: 9 January 1993 (age 32)
- Weight: 52.36 kg (115.4 lb)

Sport
- Country: Turkey
- Sport: Weightlifting
- Team: National team
- Updated on 20 July 2016

Sema Acarturk (born 9 January 1993) is a Turkish female weightlifter, competing in the 53 kg category and representing Turkey at international competitions. She competed at world championships, most recently at the 2015 World Weightlifting Championships.

== Major results ==
Year	Venue	Weight	Snatch (kg)				Clean & Jerk (kg)				Total	Rank
Year	Venue	Weight	1	2	3	Rank	1	2	3	Rank	Total	Rank
World Championships
2015	Houston, United States	-53 kg	~~79~~	79	82	17	102	~~106~~	106	14	188	15
