= Volodymyr Hoza =

Ukrainian weightlifter

Personal information
- Full name: Volodymyr Olehovich Hoza
- Born: 15 April 1996 (age 30) Zhydachiv, Lviv Oblast, Ukraine
- Height: 1.83 m (6 ft 0 in)
- Weight: 93.36 kg (206 lb)

Sport
- Country: Ukraine
- Sport: Weightlifting
- Updated on 9 April 2017

Volodymyr Olehovich Hoza (Ukrainian: Володимир Олегович Гоза, also transliterated Goza, born 15 April 1996) is a Ukrainian male weightlifter, competing in the 94 kg category and representing Ukraine at international competitions. He participated in the men's 94 kg event at the 2015 World Weightlifting Championships, and at the 2016 Summer Olympics, finishing in ninth position.

== Major results ==
Year	Venue	Weight	Snatch (kg)				Clean & Jerk (kg)				Total	Rank
Year	Venue	Weight	1	2	3	Rank	1	2	3	Rank	Total	Rank
World Championships
2015	Houston, United States	94 kg	166	~~171~~	~~171~~	13	192	197	~~202~~	17	363	15
