= Ritvars Suharevs =

Latvian weightlifter (born 1999)

Personal information
- Nationality: Latvia
- Born: 11 January 1999 (age 27) Dobele, Latvia
- Height: 1.62 m (5 ft 4 in)
- Weight: 80.90 kg (178.4 lb)

Sport
- Country: Latvia
- Sport: Weightlifting
- Event: –81 kg
- Coached by: Eduards Andruškevičs

Achievements and titles
- Personal bests: Snatch: 162 kg (2019); Clean & jerk: 192 kg (2019); Total: 354 kg (2019)
Medal record
Representing Latvia
European Championships
Gold medal – first place	2023 Yerevan	–73 kg
Bronze medal – third place	2024 Sofia	–73 kg
Bronze medal – third place	2021 Moscow	–81 kg
Bronze medal – third place	2019 Batumi	–81 kg
European Junior Championships
Silver medal – second place	2016 Eilat	–77 kg
Silver medal – second place	2015 Klaipėda	–77 kg
World Youth Championships
Silver medal – second place	2015 Lima	–69 kg
European Youth Championships
Gold medal – first place	2016 Nowy Tomyśl	–77 kg
Gold medal – first place	2015 Landskrona	–69 kg
Gold medal – first place	2014 Ciechanów	–62 kg
Gold medal – first place	2013 Klaipėda	–56 kg
Junior World Championships
Gold medal – first place	2018 Tashkent	–77 kg

Ritvars Suharevs (born 11 January 1999) is a Latvian weightlifter, and Junior World Champion competing in the 77 kg category until 2018 and 81 kg starting in 2018 after the International Weightlifting Federation reorganized the categories.

== Career ==
Suharevs' first major result came at the 2013 European Youth Championships held in Klaipėda, Lithuania where he won three golds; coming first in the overall classification along with the individual snatch and clean & jerk. The following year, in 2014, Suharevs won gold again at the European Youth Championships hosted in Ciechanów, this time in the −62 kg with a total lift of 256 kg. At the 2016 European Junior Championships, Ritvars came second in the −77 kg class, finishing only a kilogram behind gold medalist Davit Hovhannisyan.

In August 2024, Suharevs competed in the men's 73 kg event at the 2024 Summer Olympics held in Paris, France. He failed two attempts to lift 147 kg in the Snatch and finished the competition with no result. During the Olympics he suffered a shoulder injury.

== Major results ==
Year	Venue	Weight	Snatch (kg)				Clean & Jerk (kg)				Total	Rank
Year	Venue	Weight	1	2	3	Rank	1	2	3	Rank	Total	Rank
Summer Olympics
2021	Tokyo, Japan	81 kg	~~158~~	158	163	—N/a	190	195	~~198~~	—N/a	358	6
2024	Paris, France	73 kg	~~147~~	~~147~~	—	—N/a	—	—	—	—N/a	DNF	—
World Championships
2018	Ashgabat, Turkmenistan	81 kg	153	~~156~~	159	6	~~184~~	185	~~191~~	15	344	11
2019	Pattaya, Thailand	81 kg	154	~~158~~	~~160~~	16	188	192	~~200~~	11	346	12
2022	Bogotá, Colombia	73 kg	~~143~~	143	~~146~~	16	~~172~~	172	176	15	319	14
2023	Riyadh, Saudi Arabia	73 kg	150	154	~~156~~	3rd place, bronze medalist(s)	~~178~~	~~178~~	~~181~~	—	—	—
IWF World Cup
2024	Phuket, Thailand	73 kg	151	154	157	5	178	184	~~187~~	9	341	6
European Championships
2016	Førde, Norway	77 kg	143	147	150	8	167	171	~~177~~	16	321	12
2017	Split, Croatia	77 kg	145	150	~~154~~	8	175	180	185	8	335	8
2018	Bucharest, Romania	77 kg	~~150~~	150	156	3rd place, bronze medalist(s)	176	181	~~186~~	5	337	4
2019	Batumi, Georgia	81 kg	155	160	162	1st place, gold medalist(s)	183	187	192	5	354	3rd place, bronze medalist(s)
Junior World Weightlifting Championships
2017	Tokyo, Japan	77 kg	147	151	154	3rd place, bronze medalist(s)	175	180	~~184~~	6	334	4
2018	Tashkent, Uzbekistan	77 kg	148	152	156	1st place, gold medalist(s)	175	180	~~185~~	1st place, gold medalist(s)	336	1st place, gold medalist(s)
