= Henadz Laptseu =

Belarusian weightlifter (born 1998)

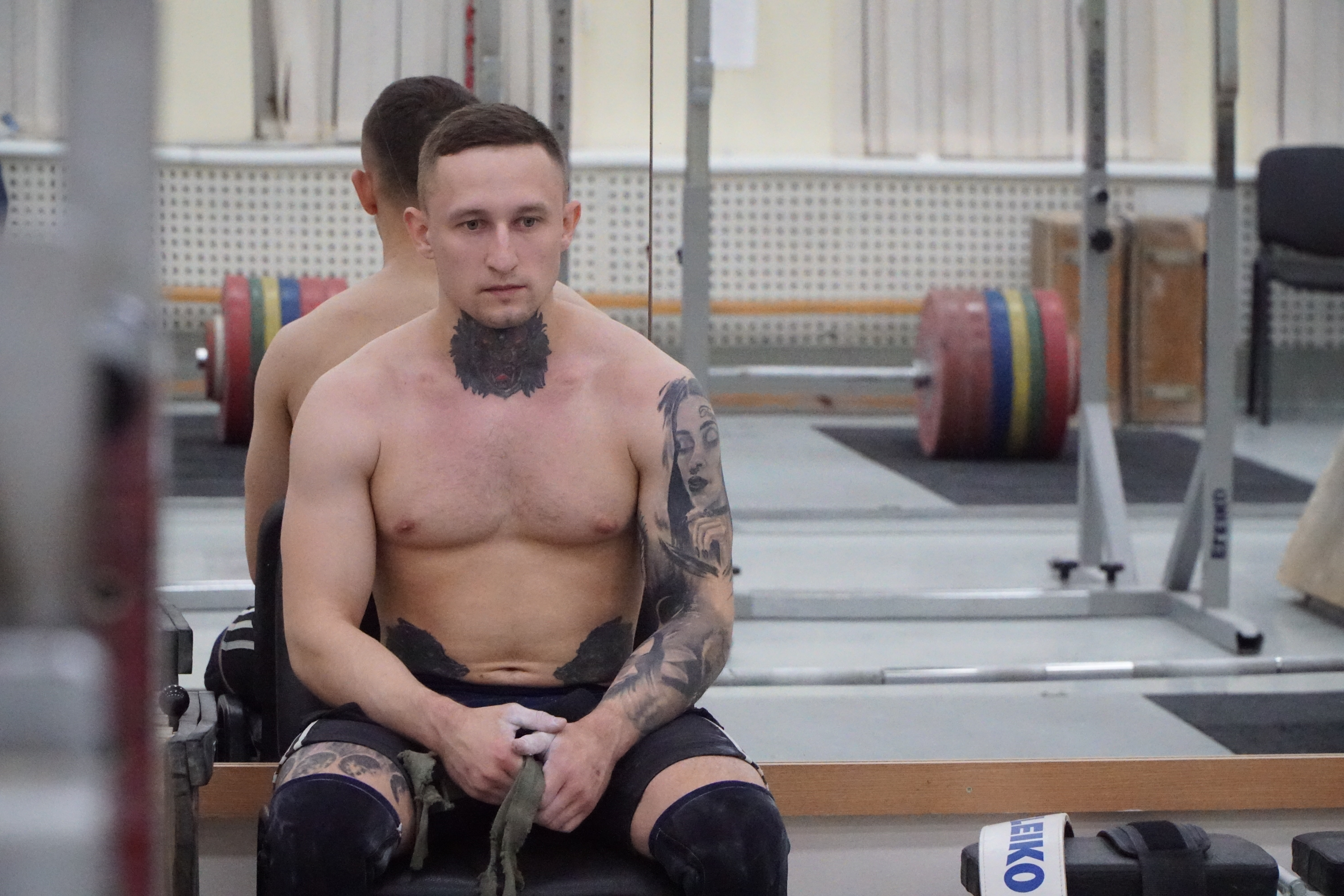
- A portrait of Henadz Laptseu sitting down

Personal information
- Nationality: Belarus
- Born: 15 December 1998 (age 27) Novopolotsk, Belarus
- Weight: 60.60 kg (133.6 lb)

Sport
- Country: Belarus
- Sport: Weightlifting
- Weight class: 61 kg
Medal record
European Championships
Gold medal – first place	2019 Batumi	–61 kg

Henadz Laptseu (Belarusian: Лаптев Геннадий; born 15 December 1998) is a Belarusian weightlifter, and European Champion competing in the 62 kg category until 2018 and 61 kg starting in 2018 after the International Weightlifting Federation reorganized the categories.

== Career ==
In 2019 he competed at the 2019 European Weightlifting Championships in the 61 kg division, winning a gold medal in the snatch and total, his total of 286 kg was 3 kg more than silver medalist Bünyamin Sezer.

== Major results ==
Year	Venue	Weight	Snatch (kg)				Clean & Jerk (kg)				Total	Rank
Year	Venue	Weight	1	2	3	Rank	1	2	3	Rank	Total	Rank
World Championships
2018	Ashgabat, Turkmenistan	61 kg	128	~~132~~	132	10	~~151~~	~~151~~	151	16	283	10
European Championships
2019	(Georgia (country)) Batumi, Georgia	61 kg	126	130	133	1st place, gold medalist(s)	150	~~152~~	153	4	286	1st place, gold medalist(s)
