= Anastasiya Mikhalenka =

Belarusian weightlifter

Personal information
- Full name: Anastasiya Mikhalenka
- Born: 8 December 1995 (age 30)
- Height: 1.62 m (5 ft 4 in)
- Weight: 67.87 kg (150 lb)

Sport
- Country: Belarus
- Sport: Weightlifting
- Updated on 9 April 2017

Anastasiya Mikhalenka (Belarusian: Анастасія Міхаленка; born November 8, 1995) is a Belarusian weightlifter, competing in the 69 kg category and representing Belarus at international competitions. Mikhalenka participated in the women's 48 kg event at the 2014 World Weightlifting Championships, and at the 2016 Summer Olympics, where she failed to register a single lift in all three attempts of the snatch phase.

== Major results ==
Year	Venue	Weight	Snatch (kg)				Clean & Jerk (kg)				Total	Rank
Year	Venue	Weight	1	2	3	Rank	1	2	3	Rank	Total	Rank
World Championships
2014	Almaty, Kazakhstan	69 kg	91	96	100	13	115	~~122~~	122	12	222	13
