= Anastasia Petrova =

Russian weightlifter

Personal information
- Born: 3 May 1997 (age 29)
- Weight: 57.60 kg (127.0 lb)

Sport
- Country: Russia
- Sport: Weightlifting
- Weight class: 58 kg
Medal record
Youth Olympic Games
Silver medal – second place	2014 Nanjing	–58 kg
- Updated on 9 November 2016

Anastasia Petrova (born 3 May 1997) is a Russian weightlifter, who competed in the 58 kg category and represented Russia at international competitions. She won the silver medal at the 2014 Summer Youth Olympics.

== Major results ==
Year	Venue	Weight	Snatch (kg)				Clean & Jerk (kg)				Total	Rank
Year	Venue	Weight	1	2	3	Rank	1	2	3	Rank	Total	Rank
Summer Youth Olympics
2014	Nanjing, China	58 kg	80	85	~~90~~	---	100	105	110	---	195	2nd place, silver medalist(s)
