= Ecaterina Tretiacova =

Moldovan weightlifter

Personal information
- Born: 22 December 1996 (age 29)
- Weight: 74.68 kg (164.6 lb)

Sport
- Country: Moldova
- Sport: Weightlifting
- Team: National team
- Updated on 31 August 2016

Ecaterina Tretiacova (born 22 December 1996) is a Moldovan female weightlifter, competing in the 75 kg category and representing Moldova at international competitions. She competed at European and world championships, including at the 2013 European Weightlifting Championships, 2014 European Weightlifting Championships and 2015 World Weightlifting Championships. She also competed multiple times at the Junior and Youth editions of European and world championships, ranking in top 10.

== Major results ==
| Year | Venue | Weight | Snatch (kg) | | | | Clean & Jerk (kg) | | | | Total | Rank |
| Year | Venue | Weight | 1 | 2 | 3 | Rank | 1 | 2 | 3 | Rank | Total | Rank |
World Championships
| 2015 | Houston, United States | 75 kg | ~~100~~ | 100 | ~~104~~ | 19 | ~~123~~ | ~~123~~ | 123 | 15 | 223 | 17 |
European Championships
| 2014 | Tel Aviv, Israel | 69 kg | 93 | | | 11 | 113 | | | 13 | 206 | 11 |
| 2013 | Tirana, Albania | 69 kg | 93 | | | 6 | 109 | | | 8 | 202 | 7 |
