= Sona Poghosyan =

Armenian weightlifter (born 1998)

Personal information
- Born: 29 June 1998 (age 28) Yerevan, Armenia
- Height: 1.58 m (5 ft 2 in)
- Weight: 73 kg (161 lb; 11 st 7 lb)

Sport
- Country: Armenia
- Sport: Weightlifting
- Event: Women's 75 kg
Medal record
Women's weightlifting
Representing Armenia
European Championships
Bronze medal – third place	2017 Split	– 75 kg

Sona Poghosyan (Armenian: Սոնա Պողոսյան, born 29 June 1998) is an Armenian weightlifter. She competed in the women's 75 kg event at the 2016 Summer Olympics. In 2018, she tested positive for GHRP-2-metabolite (AA1-3) and was banned until 2022 by the International Weightlifting Federation.
