= Veronika Ivasiuk =

Ukrainian weightlifter

Personal information
- Full name: Veronika Mykolaïvna Ivasiuk
- Born: 12 October 1995 (age 30) Kolomiya, Ukraine
- Height: 1.70 m (5 ft 7 in)
- Weight: 56.8 kg (125 lb)

Sport
- Country: Ukraine
- Sport: Weightlifting
- Event: Women's 58 kg
- Team: National team
- Updated on 30 August 2016

Veronika Mykolaïvna Ivasiuk (Ukrainian: Вероніка Миколаївна Івасюк, also transliterated Ivasyuk, born 12 October 1995) is a Ukrainian weightlifter, competing in the 58 kg category and representing Ukraine at international competitions.

== Career ==
She competed at the 2015 World Weightlifting Championships.

Ivasyuk won the silver medal at the 2016 European Weightlifting Championships after lifting 90 kg in the snatch.

She competed in the women's 58 kg event at the 2016 Summer Olympics.

== Major results ==
Year	Venue	Weight	Snatch (kg)				Clean & Jerk (kg)				Total	Rank
Year	Venue	Weight	1	2	3	Rank	1	2	3	Rank	Total	Rank
Olympic Games
2016	Rio de Janeiro, Brazil	58 kg	~~87~~	87	90	9	98	103	~~107~~	15	193	13
World Championships
2015	Houston, United States	58 kg	83	85	87	22	96	101	~~103~~	28	188	25
European Championships
2016	Førde, Norway	58 kg	88	90	~~93~~	2nd place, silver medalist(s)	105	108	~~110~~	6	198	4
2017	Split, Croatia	58 kg	90	93	95	2nd place, silver medalist(s)	106	111	~~115~~	9	206	4
