= Mirko Zanni =

Italian weightlifter (born 1997)

Personal information
- Nationality: Italy
- Born: October 16, 1997 (age 29) Pordenone, Italy
- Height: 1.71 m (5 ft 7 in)
- Weight: 68.60 kg (151.2 lb)

Sport
- Country: Italy
- Sport: Weightlifting
- Event: –69 kg

Achievements and titles
- Personal bests: Snatch: 145 kg (2021); Clean & jerk: 177 kg (2021); Total: 322 kg (2021)
Medal record
Representing Italy
Olympic Games
Bronze medal – third place	2020 Tokyo	-67 kg
European Championships
Silver medal – second place	2021 Moscow	67 kg
Bronze medal – third place	2023 Yerevan	73 kg
Mediterranean Games
Silver medal – second place	2018 Tarragona	Snatch −69 kg
European Junior Championships
Silver medal – second place	2016 Eilat	–69 kg
Youth Olympics
Bronze medal – third place	2014 Nanjing	–62 kg
European Youth Championships
Silver medal – second place	2014 Ciechanów	–62 kg

Mirko Zanni (born October 16, 1997) is an Italian weightlifter who competes in the men's –69 kg division. He won the bronze medal in the men's 67 kg event at the 2020 Summer Olympics held in Tokyo, Japan.

== Career ==
Zanni's first European competition was the 2012 European Youth Championships held in Bucharest, competing in the –62 kg category. He finished last overall, lifting a total of 194 kg.

In 2014, Zanni competed in the European Youth Championships, held in Ciechanów. He received a gold medal in the clean & jerk and won silver overall with a total lift of 253 kg. Later that year, he earned bronze at the Nanjing 2014 Summer Youth Olympics.

Zanni participated in the 2016 European Junior Weightlifting Championships. Having moved up to the –69 kg category, he finished in a silver medal position overall, achieving a 142 kg lift in the snatch and 167 kg in the clean & jerk — giving him a total of 309 kg.
