= Florina Sorina Hulpan =

Romanian weightlifter

Personal information
- Born: 7 March 1997 (age 29)
- Height: 1.58 m (5 ft 2 in)
- Weight: 68 kg (150 lb)

Sport
- Country: Romania
- Sport: Weightlifting
- Event: Women's 69 kg

Florina Sorina Hulpan (born 7 March 1997) is a Romanian weightlifter. She competed in the women's 69 kg event at the 2016 Summer Olympics.
