= Giorgi Chkheidze =

Georgian weightlifter (born 1997)

Personal information
- Full name: Giorgi Chkheidze
- Born: 30 October 1997 (age 28)
- Height: 1.78 m (5 ft 10 in)
- Weight: 104.85 kg (231 lb)

Sport
- Country: Georgia
- Sport: Weightlifting
- Coached by: Giorgi Asanidze
Medal record
Men's weightlifting
Representing Georgia
World Championships
Silver medal – second place	2022 Bogota	109 kg
European Championships
Silver medal – second place	2022 Tirana	109 kg
Silver medal – second place	2023 Yerevan	109 kg

Giorgi Chkheidze (Georgian: გიორგი ჩხეიძე; born October 30, 1997) is a Georgian male weightlifter, competing in the 105 kg category and representing Georgia at international competitions. Chkheidze participated in the men's 105 kg event at the 2015 World Weightlifting Championships, and at the 2016 Summer Olympics, where he failed to register a single lift in the clean and jerk phase.

== Major results ==
Year	Venue	Weight	Snatch (kg)				Clean & Jerk (kg)				Total	Rank
Year	Venue	Weight	1	2	3	Rank	1	2	3	Rank	Total	Rank
World Championships
2015	Houston, United States	105 kg	160	165	168	17	197	202	207	15	375	16
