= Goga Chkheidze =

Georgian weightlifter (born 1996)

Personal information
- Nationality: Georgia
- Born: 11 February 1996 (age 30)
- Weight: 66.72 kg (147 lb)

Sport
- Country: Georgia
- Sport: Weightlifting
- Event: 67 kg
Medal record
European Championships
Bronze medal – third place	2019 Batumi	–67 kg

Goga Chkheidze (Georgian: გოგა ჩხეიძე; born 11 February 1996) is a Georgian weightlifter competing in the 69 kg division until 2018 and 67 kg starting in 2018 after the International Weightlifting Federation reorganized the categories.

== Career ==
He competed at the 2019 European Weightlifting Championships in the 67 kg category.

He competed in the men's 67 kg event at the 2020 Summer Olympics in Tokyo, Japan.

== Major results ==
Year	Venue	Weight	Snatch (kg)				Clean & Jerk (kg)				Total	Rank
Year	Venue	Weight	1	2	3	Rank	1	2	3	Rank	Total	Rank
World Championships
2018	Ashgabat, Turkmenistan	67 kg	132	136	139	11	164	168	172	8	311	7
European Championships
2018	Bucharest, Romania	69 kg	130	134	137	5	165	172	~~175~~	4	309	4
2019	(Georgia (country)) Batumi, Georgia	67 kg	132	136	139	4	165	169	~~173~~	2nd place, silver medalist(s)	308	3rd place, bronze medalist(s)
