= List of Ukrainian records in Olympic weightlifting =

The following are the national records in Olympic weightlifting in Ukraine. Records are maintained in each weight class for the snatch lift, clean and jerk lift, and the total for both lifts by the Ukrainian Weightlifting Federation.

== Current records ==
=== Men ===
Event	Record	Athlete	Date	Meet	Place	Ref
60 kg
Snatch	115 kg	Standard				
Clean & Jerk	140 kg	Standard				
Total	255 kg	Standard				
65 kg
Snatch	127 kg	Standard				
Clean & Jerk	153 kg	Standard				
Total	280 kg	Standard				
71 kg
Snatch		Standard				
Clean & Jerk		Standard				
Total		Standard				
79 kg
Snatch		Standard				
Clean & Jerk		Standard				
Total		Standard				
88 kg
Snatch		Standard				
Clean & Jerk		Standard				
Total		Standard				
94 kg
Snatch		Standard				
Clean & Jerk		Standard				
Total		Standard				
110 kg
Snatch	175 kg	Standard				
Snatch	176 kg	Danylo Chyniakov	25 April 2026	European Championships	Batumi, Georgia	
Snatch	180 kg	Danylo Chyniakov	11 September 2026	Ukrainian Championships	Lutsk, Ukraine	
Clean & Jerk	207 kg	Standard				
Clean & Jerk	211 kg	Danylo Chyniakov	25 April 2026	European Championships	Batumi, Georgia	
Clean & Jerk	221 kg	Danylo Chyniakov	11 September 2026	Ukrainian Championships	Lutsk, Ukraine	
Total	382 kg	Standard				
Total	387 kg	Danylo Chyniakov	25 April 2026	European Championships	Batumi, Georgia	
Total	401 kg	Danylo Chyniakov	11 September 2026	Ukrainian Championships	Lutsk, Ukraine	
+110 kg
Snatch	180 kg	Bohdan Hoza	4 November 2025	European U23 Championships	Durrës, Albania	
Snatch	190 kg	Bohdan Taranenko	12 September 2026	Ukrainian Championships	Lutsk, Ukraine	
Clean & Jerk	222 kg	Vladyslav Prylypko	29 November 2025	Ukrainian Championships	Lutsk, Ukraine	
Clean & Jerk	226 kg	Vladyslav Prylypko	28 February 2026	Ukrainian Cup	Lutsk, Ukraine	
Clean & Jerk	231 kg	Vladyslav Prylypko	26 April 2026	European Championships	Batumi, Georgia	
Clean & Jerk	232 kg	Bohdan Taranenko	8 November 2026	World Championships	Ningbo, China	
Total	397 kg	Standard				
Total	226 kg	Vladyslav Prylypko	28 February 2026	Ukrainian Cup	Lutsk, Ukraine	
Total	406 kg	Vladyslav Prylypko	26 April 2026	European Championships	Batumi, Georgia	
Total	419 kg	Bohdan Taranenko	12 September 2026	Ukrainian Championships	Lutsk, Ukraine	
Total	422 kg	Bohdan Taranenko	8 November 2026	World Championships	Ningbo, China	

=== Women ===
Event	Record	Athlete	Date	Meet	Place	Ref
49 kg
Snatch		Standard				
Clean & Jerk		Standard				
Total		Standard				
53 kg
Snatch	86 kg	Kamila Konotop	25 November 2025	Ukrainian Championships	Lutsk, Ukraine	
Clean & Jerk	104 kg	Kamila Konotop	25 November 2025	Ukrainian Championships	Lutsk, Ukraine	
Total	190 kg	Kamila Konotop	25 November 2025	Ukrainian Championships	Lutsk, Ukraine	
57 kg
Snatch		Standard				
Clean & Jerk		Standard				
Total		Standard				
61 kg
Snatch		Standard				
Clean & Jerk		Standard				
Total		Standard				
69 kg
Snatch	96 kg	Viktoriia Lytvynets	26 November 2025	Ukrainian Championships	Lutsk, Ukraine	
Snatch	97 kg	Viktoriia Lytvynets	25 February 2026	Ukrainian Cup	Lutsk, Ukraine	
Snatch	99 kg	Viktoriia Lytvynets	9 September 2026	Ukrainian Championships	Lutsk, Ukraine	
Clean & Jerk	116 kg	Viktoriia Lytvynets	26 November 2025	Ukrainian Championships	Lutsk, Ukraine	
Clean & Jerk	117 kg	Viktoriia Lytvynets	25 February 2026	Ukrainian Cup	Lutsk, Ukraine	
Clean & Jerk	120 kg	Viktoriia Lytvynets	22 April 2026	European Championships	Batumi, Georgia	
Clean & Jerk	122 kg	Viktoriia Lytvynets	9 September 2026	Ukrainian Championships	Lutsk, Ukraine	
Total	212 kg	Viktoriia Lytvynets	26 November 2025	Ukrainian Championships	Lutsk, Ukraine	
Total	214 kg	Viktoriia Lytvynets	25 February 2026	Ukrainian Cup	Lutsk, Ukraine	
Total	216 kg	Viktoriia Lytvynets	22 April 2026	European Championships	Batumi, Georgia	
Total	221 kg	Viktoriia Lytvynets	9 September 2026	Ukrainian Championships	Lutsk, Ukraine	
77 kg
Snatch	108 kg	Iryna Dombrovska	2 November 2025	European U23 Championships	Durrës, Albania	
Snatch	110 kg	Iryna Dombrovska	23 April 2026	European Championships	Batumi, Georgia	
Clean & Jerk	131 kg	Iryna Dombrovska	8 October 2025	World Championships	Førde, Norway	
Clean & Jerk	133 kg	Iryna Dombrovska	23 April 2026	European Championships	Batumi, Georgia	
Total	236 kg	Iryna Dombrovska	8 October 2025	World Championships	Førde, Norway	
Total	243 kg	Iryna Dombrovska	23 April 2026	European Championships	Batumi, Georgia	
86 kg
Snatch	109 kg	Iryna Dombrovska	26 November 2025	Ukrainian Championships	Lutsk, Ukraine	
Snatch	113 kg	Iryna Dombrovska	7 November 2026	World Championships	Ningbo, China	
Clean & Jerk	128 kg	Anastasiia Manievska	9 October 2025	World Championships	Førde, Norway	
Clean & Jerk	130 kg	Iryna Dombrovska	25 February 2026	Ukrainian Cup	Lutsk, Ukraine	
Clean & Jerk	134 kg	Anastasiia Manievska	9 September 2026	Ukrainian Championships	Lutsk, Ukraine	
Total	234 kg	Anastasiia Manievska	9 October 2025	World Championships	Førde, Norway	
Total	242 kg	Iryna Dombrovska	9 September 2026	Ukrainian Championships	Lutsk, Ukraine	
Total	243 kg	Iryna Dombrovska	7 November 2026	World Championships	Ningbo, China	
+86 kg
Snatch	112 kg	Valentyna Kisil	26 November 2025	Ukrainian Championships	Lutsk, Ukraine	
Snatch	116 kg	Valentyna Kisil	26 April 2026	European Championships	Batumi, Georgia	
Clean & Jerk	136 kg	Krystyna Borodina	11 October 2025	World Championships	Førde, Norway	
Clean & Jerk	140 kg	Valentyna Kisil	26 April 2026	European Championships	Batumi, Georgia	
Total	247 kg	Valentyna Kisil	26 November 2025	Ukrainian Championships	Lutsk, Ukraine	
Total	256 kg	Valentyna Kisil	26 April 2026	European Championships	Batumi, Georgia	

== Historical records ==
=== Men (2025–2026) ===
Event	Record	Athlete	Date	Meet	Place	Ref
71 kg
Snatch	135 kg	Maksym Berezhnyi	30 October 2025	European Junior Championships	Durrës, Albania	
Snatch	139 kg	Maksym Berezhnyi	26 February 2026	Ukrainian Cup	Lutsk, Ukraine	
Clean & Jerk	170 kg	Standard				
Total	302 kg	Standard				
Total	303 kg	Maksym Berezhnyi	26 February 2026	Ukrainian Cup	Lutsk, Ukraine	
79 kg
Snatch	152 kg	Vitalii Daderko	31 October 2025	European Junior Championships	Durrës, Albania	
Snatch	153 kg	Vitalii Daderko	26 February 2026	Ukrainian Cup	Lutsk, Ukraine	
Clean & Jerk	180 kg	Standard				
Total	327 kg	Standard				
Total	330 kg	Vitalii Daderko	26 February 2026	Ukrainian Cup	Lutsk, Ukraine	
Total	332 kg	Vitalii Daderko	22 April 2026	European Championships	Batumi, Georgia	
88 kg
Snatch	160 kg	Standard				
Clean & Jerk	190 kg	Standard				
Total	350 kg	Standard				
94 kg
Snatch	170 kg	Anton Serdiukov	9 October 2025	World Championships	Førde, Norway	
Clean & Jerk	203 kg	Maksym Dombrovskyi	9 October 2025	World Championships	Førde, Norway	
Total	370 kg	Maksym Dombrovskyi	9 October 2025	World Championships	Førde, Norway	

=== Men (2018–2025) ===
Event	Record	Athlete	Date	Meet	Place	Ref
55 kg
Snatch	115 kg	Standard				
Clean & Jerk	140 kg	Standard				
Total	255 kg	Standard				
61 kg
Snatch	125 kg	Standard				
Clean & Jerk	150 kg	Standard				
Total	275 kg	Standard				
67 kg
Snatch	137 kg	Standard				
Clean & Jerk	168 kg	Standard				
Total	305 kg	Standard				
73 kg
Snatch	145 kg	Standard				
Clean & Jerk	175 kg	Standard				
Total	320 kg	Standard				
81 kg
Snatch	156 kg	Volodymyr Bolharyn	17 July 2019	Ukrainian Championships	Horodok, Ukraine	
Clean & Jerk	190 kg	Standard				
Total	345 kg	Standard				
89 kg
Snatch	167 kg	Volodymyr Bolharyn	10 June 2021	Ukrainian Championships	Khmelnytskyi, Ukraine	
Clean & Jerk	200 kg	Standard				
Total	366 kg	Ruslan Kozhakin	5 March 2020	Ukrainian Cup	Chernihiv, Ukraine	
96 kg
Snatch	171 kg	Kyryl Pyrohov	12 April 2019	European Championships	Batumi, Georgia	
Clean & Jerk	207 kg	Maksym Dombrovskyi	3 June 2022	European Championships	Tirana, Albania	
Total	369 kg	Maksym Dombrovskyi	3 May 2022	European Championships	Tirana, Albania	
102 kg
Snatch	180 kg	Dmytro Chumak	15 September 2018	Ukrainian Championships	Lviv, Ukraine	
Clean & Jerk	220 kg	Dmytro Chumak	15 September 2018	Ukrainian Championships	Lviv, Ukraine	
Total	400 kg	Dmytro Chumak	15 September 2018	Ukrainian Championships	Lviv, Ukraine	
109 kg
Snatch	195 kg	Bohdan Hoza	9 May 2022	Junior World Championships	Heraklion, Greece	
Clean & Jerk	226 kg	Dmytro Chumak	10 April 2021	European Championships	Moscow, Russia	
Total	410 kg	Bohdan Hoza	9 May 2022	Junior World Championships	Heraklion, Greece	
+109 kg
Snatch	195 kg	Oleksii Bibik	12 June 2021	Ukrainian Championships	Khmelnytskyi, Ukraine	
Clean & Jerk	226 kg	Oleksii Bibik	12 June 2021	Ukrainian Championships	Khmelnytskyi, Ukraine	
Total	421 kg	Oleksii Bibik	12 June 2021	Ukrainian Championships	Khmelnytskyi, Ukraine	

=== Men (1998–2018) ===
Event	Record	Athlete	Date	Meet	Place	Ref
56 kg
Snatch	125 kg	Oleksandr Likhvald	21 June 2000	Ukrainian Championships	Skadovsk, Ukraine	
Clean and jerk	153 kg	Oleksandr Likhvald	21 June 2000	Ukrainian Championships	Skadovsk, Ukraine	
Total	277.5 kg	Oleksandr Likhvald	21 June 2000	Ukrainian Championships	Skadovsk, Ukraine	
62 kg
Snatch	135 kg	Oleksandr Likhvald	12 June 2001	Ukrainian Championships	Skadovsk, Ukraine	
Clean and jerk	162.5 kg	Oleksandr Likhvald	2000		Skadovsk, Ukraine	
Total	292.5 kg	Oleksandr Likhvald	2000		Skadovsk, Ukraine	
69 kg
Snatch	155 kg	Yuriy Lavrenyuk	September 2001	European Junior Championships	Kalmar, Sweden	
Clean and jerk	180 kg	Vasyl Kovalchuk	2002		Skadovsk, Ukraine	
Total	325 kg	Yuriy Lavrenyuk	September 2001	European Junior Championships	Kalmar, Sweden	
77 kg
Snatch	165 kg	Dmytro Hnidenko	1999		Donetsk, Ukraine	
Clean and jerk	192.5 kg	Dmytro Hnidenko	25 November 1999	World Championships	Athens, Greece	
Total	355 kg	Dmytro Hnidenko	1999		Donetsk, Ukraine	
85 kg
Snatch	182 kg	Oleksandr Pielieshenko	22 September 2017	Ukrainian Championships	Lviv, Ukraine	
Clean and jerk	212 kg	Oleksandr Pielieshenko	22 September 2017	Ukrainian Championships	Lviv, Ukraine	
Total	394 kg	Oleksandr Pielieshenko	22 September 2017	Ukrainian Championships	Lviv, Ukraine	
94 kg
Snatch	190 kg	Artem Ivanov	27 April 2012	Ukrainian Championships	Khmelnytskyi, Ukraine	
Clean and jerk	230 kg	Artem Ivanov	27 April 2012	Ukrainian Championships	Khmelnytskyi, Ukraine	
Total	420 kg	Artem Ivanov	27 April 2012	Ukrainian Championships	Khmelnytskyi, Ukraine	
105 kg
Snatch	200 kg	Ihor Razoronov	2000		Skadovsk, Ukraine	
Clean and jerk	243 kg	Denys Hotfrid	2000		Skadovsk, Ukraine	
Total	440 kg	Denys Hotfrid	2000		Skadovsk, Ukraine	
+105 kg
Snatch	209 kg	Oleg Proshak	24 November 2017	Ukrainian Championships	Kharkiv, Ukraine	
Clean and jerk	252.5 kg	Oleksiy Kolokoltsev	2003		Ivano-Frankivsk, Ukraine	
Total	447.5 kg	Artem Udachyn	2003		Ivano-Frankivsk, Ukraine	

=== Women (2025–2026) ===
Event	Record	Athlete	Date	Meet	Place	Ref
48 kg
Snatch	76 kg	Kateryna Malashchuk	24 July 2025	European Youth Championships	Madrid, Spain	
Snatch	77 kg	Kateryna Malashchuk	24 February 2026	Ukrainian Cup	Lutsk, Ukraine	
Clean & Jerk	94 kg	Kateryna Malashchuk	28 October 2025	European Junior Championships	Durrës, Albania	
Clean & Jerk	95 kg	Kateryna Malashchuk	19 April 2026	European Championships	Batumi, Georgia	
Total	170 kg	Kateryna Malashchuk	28 October 2025	European Junior Championships	Durrës, Albania	
Total	172 kg	Kateryna Malashchuk	19 April 2026	European Championships	Batumi, Georgia	
58 kg
Snatch	95 kg	Olha Ivzhenko	30 October 2025	European U23 Championships	Durrës, Albania	
Snatch	100 kg	Kamila Konotop	20 April 2026	European Championships	Batumi, Georgia	
Clean & Jerk	116 kg	Olha Ivzhenko	4 October 2025	World Championships	Førde, Norway	
Clean & Jerk	121 kg	Kamila Konotop	20 April 2026	European Championships	Batumi, Georgia	
Total	210 kg	Olha Ivzhenko	30 October 2025	European U23 Championships	Durrës, Albania	
Total	211 kg	Olha Ivzhenko	24 February 2026	Ukrainian Cup	Lutsk, Ukraine	
Total	221 kg	Kamila Konotop	20 April 2026	European Championships	Batumi, Georgia	
63 kg
Snatch	97 kg	Alina Daderko	31 October 2025	European Junior Championships	Durrës, Albania	
Snatch	98 kg	Svitlana Moskvina	21 April 2026	European Championships	Batumi, Georgia	
Clean & Jerk	115 kg	Alina Daderko	31 October 2025	European Junior Championships	Durrës, Albania	
Clean & Jerk	116 kg	Alina Daderko	25 February 2026	Ukrainian Cup	Lutsk, Ukraine	
Total	212 kg	Alina Daderko	31 October 2025	European Junior Championships	Durrës, Albania	
Total	213 kg	Alina Daderko	25 February 2026	Ukrainian Cup	Lutsk, Ukraine	
Total	214 kg	Svitlana Moskvina	21 April 2026	European Championships	Batumi, Georgia	

=== Women (2018–2025) ===
Event	Record	Athlete	Date	Meet	Place	Ref
45 kg
Snatch	67 kg	Anhelina Lomachynska	3 April 2021	European Championships	Moscow, Russia	
Clean & Jerk	82 kg	Anhelina Lomachynska	3 April 2021	European Championships	Moscow, Russia	
Total	149 kg	Anhelina Lomachynska	3 April 2021	European Championships	Moscow, Russia	
49 kg
Snatch	81 kg	Anhelina Lomachynska	15 April 2023	European Championships	Yerevan, Armenia	
Clean & Jerk	95 kg	Anhelina Lomachynska	15 April 2023	European Championships	Yerevan, Armenia	
Total	176 kg	Anhelina Lomachynska	15 April 2023	European Championships	Yerevan, Armenia	
55 kg
Snatch	96 kg	Kamila Konotop	24 May 2021	Junior World Championships	Tashkent, Uzbekistan	
Clean & Jerk	116 kg	Kamila Konotop	24 May 2021	Junior World Championships	Tashkent, Uzbekistan	
Total	212 kg	Kamila Konotop	24 May 2021	Junior World Championships	Tashkent, Uzbekistan	
59 kg
Snatch	107 kg	Kamila Konotop	28 July 2023	European U23 Championships	Bucharest, Romania	
Clean & Jerk	130 kg	Kamila Konotop	28 July 2023	European U23 Championships	Bucharest, Romania	
Total	237 kg	Kamila Konotop	28 July 2023	European U23 Championships	Bucharest, Romania	
64 kg
Snatch	102 kg	Mariya Hanhur	31 May 2022	European Championships	Tirana, Albania	
Clean & Jerk	120 kg	Mariya Hanhur	31 May 2022	European Championships	Tirana, Albania	
Total	222 kg	Mariya Hanhur	31 May 2022	European Championships	Tirana, Albania	
71 kg
Snatch	105 kg	Hanna Panova	11 June 2021	Ukrainian Championships	Khmelnytskyi, Ukraine	
Clean & Jerk	124 kg	Alina Marushchak	22 October 2019	European U23 Championships	Bucharest, Romania	
Total	225 kg	Alina Marushchak	22 October 2019	European U23 Championships	Bucharest, Romania	
76 kg
Snatch	113 kg	Iryna Dekha	8 April 2021	European Championships	Moscow, Russia	
Clean & Jerk	136 kg	Iryna Dekha	11 June 2021	Ukrainian Championships	Khmelnytskyi, Ukraine	
Total	248 kg	Iryna Dekha	8 April 2021	European Championships	Moscow, Russia	
81 kg
Snatch	123 kg	Iryna Dekha	21 April 2023	European Championships	Yerevan, Armenia	
Clean & Jerk	138 kg	Iryna Dekha	14 December 2022	World Championships	Bogotá, Colombia	
Total	260 kg	Iryna Dekha	14 December 2022	World Championships	Bogotá, Colombia	
87 kg
Snatch	111 kg	Anastasiia Manievska	2 March 2023	Ukrainian Cup	Uzhhorod, Ukraine	
Clean & Jerk	134 kg	Anastasiia Manievska	2 March 2023	Ukrainian Cup	Uzhhorod, Ukraine	
Total	245 kg	Anastasiia Manievska	2 March 2023	Ukrainian Cup	Uzhhorod, Ukraine	
+87 kg
Snatch	129 kg	Anastasiya Lysenko	26 September 2019	World Championships	Pattaya, Thailand	
Clean & Jerk	157 kg	Anastasiya Lysenko	26 September 2019	World Championships	Pattaya, Thailand	
Total	286 kg	Anastasiya Lysenko	26 September 2019	World Championships	Pattaya, Thailand	

=== Women (1998–2018) ===
Event	Record	Athlete	Date	Meet	Place	Ref
48 kg
Snatch	84 kg	Iana Diachenko	July 2013	U23 Ukrainian Championships	Skadovsk, Ukraine	
Clean & Jerk	99 kg	Iana Diachenko	July 2013	U23 Ukrainian Championships	Skadovsk, Ukraine	
Total	183 kg	Iana Diachenko	July 2013	U23 Ukrainian Championships	Skadovsk, Ukraine	
53 kg
Snatch	98 kg	Iulia Paratova	17 October 2014	Ukrainian Championships	Horodok, Ukraine	
Clean & Jerk	113 kg	Nataliya Trotsenko	February 2006	Ukrainian Cup	Chernihiv, Ukraine	
Total	211 kg	Iulia Paratova	17 October 2014	Ukrainian Championships	Horodok, Ukraine	
58 kg
Snatch	106 kg^{1}	Yuliya Kalina	30 July 2012	Olympic Games	London, United Kingdom	
Clean & Jerk	129 kg^{1}	Yuliya Kalina	30 July 2012	Olympic Games	London, United Kingdom	
Total	235 kg^{1}	Yuliya Kalina	30 July 2012	Olympic Games	London, United Kingdom	
63 kg
Snatch	110 kg	Nataliya Skakun	18 November 2003	World Championships	Vancouver, Canada	
Clean & Jerk	138 kg	Nataliya Skakun	18 November 2003	World Championships	Vancouver, Canada	
Total	247 kg	Nataliya Skakun	18 November 2003	World Championships	Vancouver, Canada	
69 kg
Snatch	116 kg	Yuliya Artemova	March 2012	Ukrainian Cup	Chernihiv, Ukraine	
Clean & Jerk	140 kg	Vanda Maslovska	27 September 2003	Russian Grand Prix	Moscow, Russia	
Total	255 kg	Nataliya Davydova	2005		Lutsk, Ukraine	
75 kg
Snatch	120 kg	Iryna Dekha	6 April 2017	European Championships	Split, Croatia	
Clean & Jerk	141 kg	Iryna Dekha	8 December 2016	European Junior Championships	Eilat, Israel	
Total	260 kg	Iryna Dekha	8 December 2016	European Junior Championships	Eilat, Israel	
+75 kg
Snatch	135 kg	Olha Korobka	14 September 2011	Ukrainian Championships	Vinnytsia, Ukraine	
Clean & Jerk	165 kg	Olha Korobka	14 September 2011	Ukrainian Championships	Vinnytsia, Ukraine	
Total	300 kg	Olha Korobka	14 September 2011	Ukrainian Championships	Vinnytsia, Ukraine	

- ^1 Kalina failed the competition doping re-test in 2016 and the IOC & IWF canceled the results, the UWF however still lists them as records.
