= 2016 European Weightlifting Championships =

International sporting competition

- Location: Førde, Norway
- Dates: 10–16 April

The 2016 European Weightlifting Championships were held in Førde, Norway from 10 April to 16 April 2016.

== Medal table ==
Ranking by Big (Total result) medals

* Host nation (Norway)

| Rank | Nation | Gold | Silver | Bronze | Total |
|---|---|---|---|---|---|
| 1 | Turkey | 3 | 0 | 0 | 3 |
| 2 | Armenia | 2 | 2 | 1 | 5 |
| 3 | Ukraine | 2 | 1 | 0 | 3 |
| 4 | Georgia | 2 | 0 | 0 | 2 |
| 5 | Russia | 1 | 3 | 1 | 5 |
| 6 | Romania | 1 | 2 | 4 | 7 |
| 7 | Poland | 1 | 1 | 2 | 4 |
| 8 | Italy | 1 | 1 | 1 | 3 |
| 9 | Latvia | 1 | 0 | 1 | 2 |
| 10 | Azerbaijan | 1 | 0 | 0 | 1 |
| 11 | Great Britain | 0 | 1 | 1 | 2 |
| 11 | Spain | 0 | 1 | 1 | 2 |
| 13 | Belarus | 0 | 1 | 0 | 1 |
| 13 | France | 0 | 1 | 0 | 1 |
| 13 | Lithuania | 0 | 1 | 0 | 1 |
| 16 | Bulgaria | 0 | 0 | 1 | 1 |
| 16 | Estonia | 0 | 0 | 1 | 1 |
| 16 | Moldova | 0 | 0 | 1 | 1 |
| Totals (18 entries) | | 15 | 15 | 15 | 45 |

Ranking by all medals: Big (Total result) and Small (Snatch and Clean & Jerk)

* Host nation (Norway)

| Rank | Nation | Gold | Silver | Bronze | Total |
|---|---|---|---|---|---|
| 1 | Turkey | 8 | 2 | 1 | 11 |
| 2 | Ukraine | 6 | 3 | 2 | 11 |
| 3 | Georgia | 6 | 0 | 0 | 6 |
| 4 | Armenia | 5 | 7 | 3 | 15 |
| 5 | Russia | 5 | 7 | 2 | 14 |
| 6 | Romania | 4 | 4 | 7 | 15 |
| 7 | Azerbaijan | 3 | 0 | 1 | 4 |
| 8 | Poland | 2 | 4 | 6 | 12 |
| 9 | Italy | 2 | 4 | 4 | 10 |
| 10 | Latvia | 2 | 1 | 2 | 5 |
| 11 | Spain | 1 | 2 | 1 | 4 |
| 12 | Belarus | 1 | 2 | 0 | 3 |
| 13 | France | 0 | 3 | 1 | 4 |
| 14 | Great Britain | 0 | 2 | 5 | 7 |
| 15 | Lithuania | 0 | 2 | 0 | 2 |
| 16 | Bulgaria | 0 | 1 | 2 | 3 |
| 17 | Estonia | 0 | 1 | 1 | 2 |
| 18 | Moldova | 0 | 0 | 4 | 4 |
| 19 | Albania | 0 | 0 | 1 | 1 |
| 19 | Austria | 0 | 0 | 1 | 1 |
| 19 | Czech Republic | 0 | 0 | 1 | 1 |
| Totals (21 entries) | | 45 | 45 | 45 | 135 |

== Medal overview ==
=== Men ===
| Event | | Gold | | Silver | | Bronze | |
| – 56 kg | Snatch | Josué Brachi (ESP) | 121 kg | Mirco Scarantino (ITA) | 120 kg | İsmet Algül (TUR) | 115 kg |
| – 56 kg | Clean & Jerk | Mirco Scarantino (ITA) | 144 kg | Josué Brachi (ESP) | 143 kg | Elmar Aliyev (AZE) | 136 kg |
| – 56 kg | Total | Mirco Scarantino (ITA) | 264 kg | Josué Brachi (ESP) | 264 kg | Ilie Constantin Ciotoiu (ROU) | 247 kg |
| – 62 kg | Snatch | Erol Bilgin (TUR) | 133 kg | Feliks Khalibekov (RUS) | 133 kg | Vladimir Urumov (BUL) | 129 kg |
| – 62 kg | Clean & Jerk | Hurşit Atak (TUR) | 170 kg | Vladimir Urumov (BUL) | 159 kg | Iuri Dudoglo (MDA) | 156 kg |
| – 62 kg | Total | Hurşit Atak (TUR) | 296 kg | Feliks Khalibekov (RUS) | 289 kg | Vladimir Urumov (BUL) | 288 kg |
| – 69 kg | Snatch | Daniyar Ismayilov (TUR) | 155 kg | Sergei Petrov (RUS) | 147 kg | Briken Calja (ALB) | 145 kg |
| – 69 kg | Clean & Jerk | Daniyar Ismayilov (TUR) | 178 kg | Sergei Petrov (RUS) | 175 kg | Vanik Avetisyan (ARM) | 175 kg |
| – 69 kg | Total | Daniyar Ismayilov (TUR) | 333 kg | Sergei Petrov (RUS) | 322 kg | David Sanchez Lopez (ESP) | 318 kg |
| – 77 kg | Snatch | Andranik Karapetyan (ARM) | 170 kg | Tigran Martirosyan (ARM) | 160 kg | Dumitru Captari (ROU) | 156 kg |
| – 77 kg | Clean & Jerk | Andranik Karapetyan (ARM) | 197 kg | Tigran Martirosyan (ARM) | 192 kg | Dumitru Captari (ROU) | 192 kg |
| – 77 kg | Total | Andranik Karapetyan (ARM) | 367 kg | Tigran Martirosyan (ARM) | 352 kg | Dumitru Captari (ROU) | 348 kg |
| – 85 kg | Snatch | Gabriel Sincraian (ROU) | 169 kg | Oleksandr Pielieshenko (UKR) | 168 kg | Battista Giovanni Bardis (FRA) | 166 kg |
| – 85 kg | Clean & Jerk | Oleksandr Pielieshenko (UKR) | 204 kg | Gabriel Sincraian (ROU) | 202 kg | Antonino Pizzolato (ITA) | 197 kg |
| – 85 kg | Total | Oleksandr Pielieshenko (UKR) | 372 kg | Gabriel Sincraian (ROU) | 371 kg | Gheorghii Cernei (ROU) | 358 kg |
| – 94 kg | Snatch | Tomasz Zieliński (POL) | 176 kg | Zygimantas Stanulis (LTU) | 175 kg | Łukasz Grela (POL) | 174 kg |
| – 94 kg | Clean & Jerk | Egor Klimonov (RUS) | 211 kg | Tomasz Zieliński (POL) | 211 kg | Georgii Kuptsov (RUS) | 206 kg |
| – 94 kg | Total | Tomasz Zieliński (POL) | 387 kg | Zygimantas Stanulis (LTU) | 381 kg | Georgii Kuptsov (RUS) | 376 kg |
| – 105 kg | Snatch | Rodion Bochkov (RUS) | 182 kg | Simon Martirosyan (ARM) | 182 kg | Sargis Martirosjan (AUT) | 181 kg |
| – 105 kg | Clean & Jerk | Arturs Plesnieks (LAT) | 226 kg | Arkadiusz Michalski (POL) | 226 kg | Simon Martirosyan (ARM) | 220 kg |
| – 105 kg | Total | Arturs Plesnieks (LAT) | 403 kg | Arkadiusz Michalski (POL) | 403 kg | Simon Martirosyan (ARM) | 402 kg |
| + 105 kg | Snatch | Lasha Talakhadze (GEO) | 212 kg | Gor Minasyan (ARM) | 205 kg | Ihor Shymechko (UKR) | 196 kg |
| + 105 kg | Clean & Jerk | Lasha Talakhadze (GEO) | 251 kg | Mart Seim (EST) | 239 kg | Jiri Orsag (CZE) | 238 kg |
| + 105 kg | Total | Lasha Talakhadze (GEO) | 463 kg | Gor Minasyan (ARM) | 443 kg | Mart Seim (EST) | 424 kg |

=== Women ===
| Event | | Gold | | Silver | | Bronze | |
| – 48 kg | Snatch | Monica Suneta Csengeri (ROU) | 83 kg | Sibel Özkan (TUR) | 82 kg | Genny Pagliaro (ITA) | 81 kg |
| – 48 kg | Clean & Jerk | Sibel Özkan (TUR) | 100 kg | Genny Pagliaro (ITA) | 99 kg | Iana Diachenko (UKR) | 98 kg |
| – 48 kg | Total | Sibel Özkan (TUR) | 182 kg | Genny Pagliaro (ITA) | 180 kg | Monica Suneta Csengeri (ROU) | 178 kg |
| – 53 kg | Snatch | Iulia Paratova (UKR) | 94 kg | Rebeka Koha (LAT) | 90 kg | Cristina Iovu (ROU) | 90 kg |
| – 53 kg | Clean & Jerk | Cristina Iovu (ROU) | 120 kg | Sema Acartürk (TUR) | 109 kg | Rebeka Koha (LAT) | 108 kg |
| – 53 kg | Total | Cristina Iovu (ROU) | 210 kg | Iulia Paratova (UKR) | 202 kg | Rebeka Koha (LAT) | 198 kg |
| – 58 kg | Snatch | Boyanka Kostova (AZE) | 105 kg | Veronika Ivasiuk (UKR) | 90 kg | Joanna Łochowska (POL) | 90 kg |
| – 58 kg | Clean & Jerk | Boyanka Kostova (AZE) | 130 kg | Irina Lepșa (ROU) | 117 kg | Joanna Łochowska (POL) | 114 kg |
| – 58 kg | Total | Boyanka Kostova (AZE) | 235 kg | Irina Lepșa (ROU) | 205 kg | Joanna Łochowska (POL) | 204 kg |
| – 63 kg | Snatch | Diana Akhmetova (RUS) | 100 kg | Natalia Khlestkina (RUS) | 99 kg | Giorgia Bordignon (ITA) | 99 kg |
| – 63 kg | Clean & Jerk | Natalia Khlestkina (RUS) | 123 kg | Giorgia Bordignon (ITA) | 120 kg | Zoe Smith (GBR) | 119 kg |
| – 63 kg | Total | Natalia Khlestkina (RUS) | 222 kg | Diana Akhmetova (RUS) | 219 kg | Giorgia Bordignon (ITA) | 219 kg |
| – 69 kg | Snatch | Darya Pachabut (BLR) | 106 kg | Nazik Avdalyan (ARM) | 105 kg | Rebekah Tiler (GBR) | 99 kg |
| – 69 kg | Clean & Jerk | Nazik Avdalyan (ARM) | 132 kg | Darya Pachabut (BLR) | 130 kg | Rebekah Tiler (GBR) | 123 kg |
| – 69 kg | Total | Nazik Avdalyan (ARM) | 237 kg | Darya Pachabut (BLR) | 236 kg | Rebekah Tiler (GBR) | 222 kg |
| – 75 kg | Snatch | Iryna Dekha (UKR) | 115 kg | Gaëlle Nayo-Ketchanke (FRA) | 110 kg | Natalia Priscepa (MDA) | 110 kg |
| – 75 kg | Clean & Jerk | Iryna Dekha (UKR) | 135 kg | Gaëlle Nayo-Ketchanke (FRA) | 132 kg | Natalia Priscepa (MDA) | 130 kg |
| – 75 kg | Total | Iryna Dekha (UKR) | 250 kg | Gaëlle Nayo-Ketchanke (FRA) | 242 kg | Natalia Priscepa (MDA) | 240 kg |
| +75 kg | Snatch | Anastasiia Hotfrid (GEO) | 113 kg | Mercy Brown (GBR) | 103 kg | Emilia Mierzejeweska (POL) | 102 kg |
| +75 kg | Clean & Jerk | Anastasiia Hotfrid (GEO) | 136 kg | Sabina Baginska (POL) | 131 kg | Mercy Brown (GBR) | 127 kg |
| +75 kg | Total | Anastasiia Hotfrid (GEO) | 249 kg | Mercy Brown (GBR) | 230 kg | Emilia Mierzejeweska (POL) | 223 kg |

== Results ==
=== Men's 56 kg ===
| Rank | Athlete | Group | Body weight | Snatch (kg) | | | | Clean & Jerk (kg) | | | | Total |
| Rank | Athlete | Group | Body weight | 1 | 2 | 3 | Rank | 1 | 2 | 3 | Rank | Total |
|---|---|---|---|---|---|---|---|---|---|---|---|---|
| 1st place, gold medalist(s) | Mirco Scarantino (ITA) | A | 55.54 | 114 | 117 | 120 | 2 | 141 | 144 | ~~150~~ | 1 | 264 |
| 2nd place, silver medalist(s) | Josué Brachi (ESP) | A | 55.73 | 118 | 121 | ~~123~~ | 1 | 140 | 143 | ~~145~~ | 2 | 264 |
| 3rd place, bronze medalist(s) | Ilie Constantin Ciotoiu (ROU) | A | 55.62 | 108 | 111 | ~~113~~ | 5 | 133 | 136 | ~~139~~ | 4 | 247 |
| 4 | İsmet Algül (TUR) | A | 55.32 | 110 | ~~114~~ | 115 | 3 | ~~130~~ | 130 | ~~135~~ | 7 | 245 |
| 5 | Gökhan Kılıç (TUR) | A | 55.59 | 110 | ~~115~~ | ~~116~~ | 6 | 134 | ~~137~~ | ~~138~~ | 5 | 244 |
| 6 | Tom Goegebuer (BEL) | A | 55.40 | 109 | 112 | 114 | 4 | 127 | ~~132~~ | ~~133~~ | 8 | 241 |
| 7 | Elmar Aliyev (AZE) | A | 55.21 | 102 | ~~108~~ | ~~108~~ | 8 | 130 | 133 | 136 | 3 | 238 |
| 8 | Dominik Kozlowski (POL) | A | 55.69 | 110 | ~~114~~ | ~~114~~ | 7 | 125 | ~~130~~ | ~~130~~ | 9 | 235 |
| 9 | Vanik Mkrtumian (RUS) | A | 55.55 | ~~100~~ | 100 | ~~105~~ | 9 | 133 | ~~139~~ | ~~139~~ | 6 | 233 |
| 10 | Fabio Arcara (ITA) | B | 55.28 | 90 | ~~95~~ | 95 | 10 | 110 | 115 | ~~120~~ | 10 | 210 |
| 11 | Michal Palkovic (SVK) | B | 55.58 | 82 | ~~86~~ | 86 | 11 | 102 | 107 | 111 | 11 | 197 |
| 12 | Tomáš Mirga (CZE) | B | 53.90 | 77 | 82 | 85 | 12 | 98 | 102 | ~~106~~ | 13 | 187 |
| 13 | František Polák (CZE) | B | 52.86 | 75 | 80 | 83 | 15 | 95 | 99 | 102 | 12 | 185 |
| 14 | Balázs Kerekes (HUN) | B | 55.17 | ~~80~~ | 80 | 85 | 13 | 96 | ~~100~~ | 100 | 14 | 185 |
| 15 | Sam Henderson (GBR) | B | 54.94 | 80 | ~~84~~ | 84 | 14 | 97 | ~~101~~ | ~~101~~ | 15 | 181 |
| 16 | Georgije Bogojević (CRO) | B | 55.08 | 55 | 60 | 63 | 16 | 70 | 80 | 85 | 16 | 148 |

=== Men's 62 kg ===
| Rank | Athlete | Group | Body weight | Snatch (kg) | | | | Clean & Jerk (kg) | | | | Total |
| Rank | Athlete | Group | Body weight | 1 | 2 | 3 | Rank | 1 | 2 | 3 | Rank | Total |
|---|---|---|---|---|---|---|---|---|---|---|---|---|
| 1st place, gold medalist(s) | Hurşit Atak (TUR) | A | 61.68 | 126 | ~~129~~ | ~~129~~ | 5 | 157 | 163 | 170 | 1 | 296 |
| 2nd place, silver medalist(s) | Feliks Khalibekov (RUS) | A | 61.74 | 125 | 130 | 133 | 2 | 150 | 156 | ~~159~~ | 4 | 289 |
| 3rd place, bronze medalist(s) | Vladimir Marinov Urumov (BUL) | A | 61.33 | 125 | ~~128~~ | 129 | 3 | 152 | ~~155~~ | 159 | 2 | 288 |
| 4 | Erol Bilgin (TUR) | A | 61.55 | 126 | 130 | 133 | 1 | ~~151~~ | 151 | 155 | 5 | 288 |
| 5 | Iuri Dudoglo (MDA) | A | 61.25 | 124 | 126 | 128 | 4 | ~~155~~ | ~~155~~ | 156 | 3 | 284 |
| 6 | Ionuț Ilie (ROU) | A | 61.47 | ~~122~~ | 122 | ~~126~~ | 8 | 145 | 149 | 151 | 7 | 273 |
| 7 | Stilyan Grozdev (BUL) | A | 61.36 | 117 | 121 | 124 | 6 | ~~145~~ | 145 | ~~149~~ | 9 | 269 |
| 8 | Gergely Zoltán Soóky (HUN) | B | 61.59 | 113 | ~~117~~ | 117 | 11 | 147 | 152 | ~~155~~ | 6 | 269 |
| 9 | Ramini Shamilishvili (GEO) | B | 61.38 | 118 | 121 | 123 | 7 | 142 | ~~147~~ | ~~147~~ | 11 | 265 |
| 10 | Allahyar Abishov (AZE) | B | 60.99 | ~~121~~ | 121 | ~~126~~ | 9 | 142 | ~~151~~ | ~~151~~ | 10 | 263 |
| 11 | Gareth Evans (GBR) | B | 61.65 | 115 | 119 | ~~122~~ | 10 | ~~142~~ | 142 | ~~146~~ | 12 | 261 |
| 12 | Romario Avdiraj (ALB) | B | 61.32 | 110 | 113 | ~~116~~ | 14 | 140 | 143 | 145 | 8 | 258 |
| 13 | Michael Di Giusto (ITA) | B | 61.60 | 109 | 113 | 116 | 12 | 137 | 141 | ~~143~~ | 13 | 257 |
| 14 | Ivan Garcia Rueda (ESP) | B | 61.55 | 115 | ~~118~~ | ~~118~~ | 13 | 135 | ~~140~~ | ~~140~~ | 14 | 250 |
| 15 | Arthouros Akritidis (GRE) | B | 61.62 | 102 | 107 | 111 | 15 | 127 | ~~132~~ | 132 | 15 | 243 |
| 16 | Bar Lewi (ISR) | B | 61.02 | 106 | 110 | ~~113~~ | 16 | 125 | ~~130~~ | ~~130~~ | 16 | 235 |
| 17 | Vlastimil Moskál (CZE) | B | 61.42 | 95 | 100 | ~~102~~ | 17 | 115 | 120 | 123 | 17 | 223 |
| — | Dimitris Minasidis (CYP) | A | 61.31 | ~~123~~ | ~~125~~ | ~~125~~ | — | — | — | — | — | — |

=== Men's 69 kg ===
| Rank | Athlete | Group | Body weight | Snatch (kg) | | | | Clean & Jerk (kg) | | | | Total |
| Rank | Athlete | Group | Body weight | 1 | 2 | 3 | Rank | 1 | 2 | 3 | Rank | Total |
|---|---|---|---|---|---|---|---|---|---|---|---|---|
| 1st place, gold medalist(s) | Daniyar Ismayilov (TUR) | A | 68.25 | 150 | 155 | ~~161~~ | 1 | 178 | ~~182~~ | ~~190~~ | 1 | 333 |
| 2nd place, silver medalist(s) | Sergei Petrov (RUS) | A | 68.58 | 140 | 144 | 147 | 2 | 171 | 175 | ~~178~~ | 4 | 322 |
| 3rd place, bronze medalist(s) | David Sanchez Lopez (ESP) | B | 68.62 | 138 | ~~143~~ | 143 | 4 | 170 | 175 | ~~178~~ | 4 | 318 |
| 4 | Bernardin Matam (FRA) | A | 68.26 | 137 | 140 | ~~143~~ | 5 | 173 | ~~178~~ | ~~178~~ | 5 | 313 |
| 5 | Vanik Avetisyan (ARM) | A | 68.61 | ~~137~~ | ~~137~~ | 137 | 9 | 175 | ~~181~~ | ~~181~~ | 3 | 312 |
| 6 | Artsiom Shahau (BLR) | A | 68.80 | ~~138~~ | ~~138~~ | 138 | 8 | 165 | ~~176~~ | ~~176~~ | 8 | 303 |
| 7 | Ahmet Turan Okyay (TUR) | A | 68.52 | 136 | ~~141~~ | ~~143~~ | 10 | 161 | 165 | ~~170~~ | 6 | 301 |
| 8 | Simon Brandhuber (GER) | A | 68.75 | 137 | ~~140~~ | 140 | 6 | ~~161~~ | ~~161~~ | 161 | 11 | 301 |
| 9 | Robert Friedrich Joachim (GER) | B | 68.60 | ~~132~~ | ~~132~~ | 132 | 14 | 157 | 162 | 165 | 7 | 297 |
| 10 | Yann Aucouturier (FRA) | B | 68.38 | 130 | ~~134~~ | 134 | 11 | 160 | 162 | ~~164~~ | 10 | 296 |
| 11 | Rostam Karapetyan (ARM) | A | 68.33 | 133 | ~~136~~ | ~~136~~ | 12 | ~~160~~ | ~~160~~ | 160 | 12 | 293 |
| 12 | Zlatko Ganchev Minchev (BUL) | A | 68.50 | ~~133~~ | ~~133~~ | 133 | 13 | 160 | ~~164~~ | ~~164~~ | 13 | 293 |
| 13 | Victor Castro Marino (ESP) | B | 68.64 | 133 | ~~138~~ | 138 | 7 | 155 | ~~160~~ | ~~160~~ | 14 | 293 |
| 14 | Petr Petrov (CZE) | B | 68.50 | 125 | ~~130~~ | ~~133~~ | 16 | 155 | 164 | ~~168~~ | 9 | 289 |
| 15 | Samuele Faciano (ITA) | B | 68.29 | 115 | 120 | ~~123~~ | 17 | 140 | 143 | 146 | 17 | 266 |
| 16 | Michail Vasilopoulos-Koufos (GRE) | B | 68.43 | 116 | ~~122~~ | ~~122~~ | 19 | ~~146~~ | ~~150~~ | 150 | 15 | 266 |
| 17 | Daniel Roness Strand (NOR) | B | 68.68 | 110 | 115 | ~~118~~ | 20 | ~~140~~ | 140 | 149 | 16 | 264 |
| 18 | Christopher Xavier Freebury (GBR) | B | 68.35 | 115 | 119 | ~~121~~ | 18 | 138 | ~~142~~ | ~~142~~ | 18 | 257 |
| 19 | Mathias Strom (DEN) | B | 68.34 | 102 | 107 | 110 | 21 | 128 | 133 | ~~138~~ | 19 | 243 |
| 20 | Arbnor Krasniqi (KOS) | B | 68.72 | ~~82~~ | ~~82~~ | 82 | 22 | 100 | 105 | 108 | 20 | 190 |
| — | Mirko Zanni (ITA) | B | 66.19 | — | — | — | — | — | — | — | — | — |
| — | Briken Calja (ALB) | A | 68.55 | 142 | 145 | ~~147~~ | 3 | ~~177~~ | ~~178~~ | ~~178~~ | — | — |
| — | Dian Ganchev Minchev (BUL) | A | 68.56 | 130 | ~~133~~ | ~~133~~ | 15 | — | — | — | — | — |

=== Women's 48 kg ===
| Rank | Athlete | Group | Body weight | Snatch (kg) | | | | Clean & Jerk (kg) | | | | Total |
| Rank | Athlete | Group | Body weight | 1 | 2 | 3 | Rank | 1 | 2 | 3 | Rank | Total |
|---|---|---|---|---|---|---|---|---|---|---|---|---|
| 1st place, gold medalist(s) | Sibel Özkan (TUR) | A | 47.68 | ~~81~~ | 81 | 82 | 2 | 100 | ~~101~~ | — | 1 | 182 |
| 2nd place, silver medalist(s) | Genny Pagliaro (ITA) | A | 47.55 | 77 | 79 | 81 | 3 | 97 | 99 | ~~101~~ | 2 | 180 |
| 3rd place, bronze medalist(s) | Monica Csengeri (ROU) | A | 47.80 | 79 | 82 | 83 | 1 | 95 | ~~98~~ | ~~98~~ | 5 | 178 |
| 4 | Iana Diachenko (UKR) | A | 47.57 | ~~78~~ | 78 | ~~82~~ | 5 | 93 | 96 | 98 | 3 | 176 |
| 5 | Anaïs Michel (FRA) | A | 47.58 | ~~79~~ | 79 | ~~81~~ | 4 | 97 | ~~100~~ | ~~100~~ | 4 | 176 |
| 6 | Estefanía Juan (ESP) | B | 47.85 | 70 | ~~73~~ | 73 | 7 | 93 | ~~96~~ | ~~96~~ | 6 | 166 |
| 7 | Shqiponje Brahja (ALB) | A | 47.81 | 75 | ~~79~~ | ~~80~~ | 6 | ~~90~~ | 90 | ~~96~~ | 8 | 165 |
| 8 | Maria Pipiliaridou (GRE) | B | 47.81 | 66 | 69 | ~~71~~ | 11 | ~~85~~ | 85 | 89 | 9 | 158 |
| 9 | Nadezhda-Mey Tuy Nguen (BUL) | B | 46.64 | 67 | 70 | ~~72~~ | 10 | ~~87~~ | 87 | ~~90~~ | 10 | 157 |
| 10 | Marziyya Maharramova (AZE) | B | 47.51 | 65 | 68 | 70 | 9 | ~~85~~ | 85 | ~~88~~ | 12 | 155 |
| 11 | Hannah Powell (GBR) | B | 47.26 | ~~64~~ | 64 | 66 | 12 | 84 | 86 | ~~88~~ | 11 | 152 |
| 12 | Eva Giganti (ITA) | B | 47.46 | ~~68~~ | 68 | 71 | 8 | 78 | 81 | ~~83~~ | 14 | 152 |
| 13 | Sini Kukkonen (FIN) | B | 47.80 | 63 | ~~65~~ | 65 | 13 | 80 | ~~83~~ | 83 | 13 | 148 |
| 14 | Veronika Věžníková (CZE) | B | 47.35 | 58 | 60 | 62 | 14 | 68 | 71 | 73 | 16 | 135 |
| 15 | Anna Boga (GRE) | B | 47.59 | ~~60~~ | 60 | ~~62~~ | 15 | ~~75~~ | 75 | 80 | 15 | 135 |
| 16 | Alexandria Craig (IRL) | B | 46.72 | ~~56~~ | 56 | 58 | 16 | ~~70~~ | 70 | ~~72~~ | 17 | 128 |
| 17 | Petra Klimparová (CZE) | B | 47.89 | 49 | ~~52~~ | 52 | 17 | 59 | ~~62~~ | 62 | 18 | 114 |
| — | Manon Lorentz (FRA) | A | 47.43 | ~~80~~ | ~~80~~ | ~~80~~ | — | 95 | ~~98~~ | ~~98~~ | 7 | — |
| DQ | Nurcan Taylan (TUR) | A | 47.43 | 78 | ~~81~~ | 81 | — | ~~95~~ | 96 | ~~98~~ | — | — |

=== Women's 53 kg ===
| Rank | Athlete | Group | Body weight | Snatch (kg) | | | | Clean & Jerk (kg) | | | | Total |
| Rank | Athlete | Group | Body weight | 1 | 2 | 3 | Rank | 1 | 2 | 3 | Rank | Total |
|---|---|---|---|---|---|---|---|---|---|---|---|---|
| 1st place, gold medalist(s) | Cristina Iovu (ROU) | A | 52.56 | 90 | ~~94~~ | ~~95~~ | 3 | 110 | 113 | 120 | 1 | 210 |
| 2nd place, silver medalist(s) | Iulia Paratova (UKR) | A | 52.51 | ~~90~~ | 90 | 94 | 1 | ~~108~~ | ~~108~~ | 108 | 4 | 202 |
| 3rd place, bronze medalist(s) | Rebeka Koha (LVA) | A | 52.19 | 87 | 90 | ~~92~~ | 2 | 102 | 105 | 108 | 3 | 198 |
| 4 | Sema Acartürk (TUR) | A | 52.48 | ~~82~~ | ~~82~~ | 82 | 6 | 103 | 106 | 109 | 2 | 191 |
| 5 | Evagjelia Veli (ALB) | A | 52.01 | 83 | ~~87~~ | ~~87~~ | 5 | 100 | ~~105~~ | ~~106~~ | 7 | 183 |
| 6 | Atenery Hernández Martín (ESP) | A | 52.57 | 78 | 81 | ~~83~~ | 7 | 98 | 101 | ~~103~~ | 6 | 182 |
| 7 | Julia Schwarzbach (GER) | A | 52.74 | 79 | ~~82~~ | ~~82~~ | 9 | 99 | 102 | ~~104~~ | 5 | 181 |
| 8 | Bediha Tunadağı (TUR) | A | 52.12 | ~~80~~ | 80 | ~~85~~ | 8 | ~~100~~ | ~~100~~ | 100 | 8 | 180 |
| 9 | Anna Govelyan (ARM) | B | 52.53 | 75 | 78 | ~~80~~ | 10 | 93 | 96 | ~~100~~ | 9 | 174 |
| 10 | Maya Petrova Ivanova (BUL) | A | 52.74 | 75 | ~~78~~ | ~~78~~ | 14 | 96 | ~~100~~ | ~~100~~ | 10 | 171 |
| 11 | Giorgia Russo (ITA) | B | 52.59 | 73 | 75 | ~~77~~ | 13 | 95 | ~~100~~ | ~~100~~ | 11 | 171 |
| 12 | Aksana Zalatarova (ISR) | B | 52.79 | 75 | 77 | ~~79~~ | 12 | 86 | 89 | — | 13 | 166 |
| 13 | Sarah Orteza Hovden Øvsthus (NOR) | B | 51.60 | 71 | 74 | ~~75~~ | 15 | 87 | ~~90~~ | 90 | 12 | 164 |
| 14 | Pauliina Utoslahti (FIN) | B | 52.73 | 69 | 72 | ~~74~~ | 16 | ~~86~~ | ~~86~~ | 86 | 15 | 158 |
| 15 | Christina Ejstrup (DEN) | C | 50.13 | 64 | 66 | 68 | 19 | 82 | 85 | ~~87~~ | 17 | 153 |
| 16 | Noorin Gulam (GBR) | C | 52.14 | 66 | 69 | ~~71~~ | 17 | 83 | ~~86~~ | ~~86~~ | 19 | 152 |
| 17 | Rebekka Tao Jacobsen (NOR) | B | 52.76 | 66 | ~~68~~ | ~~68~~ | 20 | 84 | 86 | ~~88~~ | 16 | 152 |
| 18 | Aleksandra Stepanova (LTU) | B | 51.23 | 65 | 68 | ~~70~~ | 18 | 80 | 83 | ~~85~~ | 18 | 151 |
| 19 | Zsuzsanna Eszter Valkó (HUN) | C | 52.05 | 56 | ~~61~~ | 64 | 22 | 80 | 86 | ~~87~~ | 14 | 150 |
| 20 | Gulchin Alizada (AZE) | B | 50.26 | 65 | ~~68~~ | ~~68~~ | 21 | ~~80~~ | 80 | ~~83~~ | 20 | 145 |
| 21 | Tham Nguyen (IRL) | C | 50.13 | 60 | ~~62~~ | ~~62~~ | 23 | 72 | ~~75~~ | ~~75~~ | 22 | 132 |
| 21 | Eithne Harte (IRL) | C | 52.54 | 52 | ~~54~~ | 54 | 24 | 68 | ~~72~~ | 73 | 21 | 127 |
| — | Lotte Laurentia Janssen (NED) | B | 52.26 | 75 | ~~77~~ | 77 | 11 | ~~90~~ | ~~90~~ | ~~90~~ | — | — |
| — | Kristina Sobol (RUS) | A | 52.54 | 85 | 88 | ~~91~~ | 4 | ~~100~~ | ~~100~~ | ~~100~~ | — | — |

=== Women's 58 kg ===
| Rank | Athlete | Group | Body weight | Snatch (kg) | | | | Clean & Jerk (kg) | | | | Total |
| Rank | Athlete | Group | Body weight | 1 | 2 | 3 | Rank | 1 | 2 | 3 | Rank | Total |
|---|---|---|---|---|---|---|---|---|---|---|---|---|
| 1st place, gold medalist(s) | Boyanka Kostova (AZE) | A | 57.41 | 95 | 100 | 105 | 1 | 120 | 130 | — | 1 | 235 |
| 2nd place, silver medalist(s) | Irina Lepșa (ROU) | A | 57.68 | 88 | ~~91~~ | ~~91~~ | 5 | 111 | 117 | — | 2 | 205 |
| 3rd place, bronze medalist(s) | Joanna Lochowska (POL) | A | 57.41 | ~~90~~ | ~~90~~ | 90 | 3 | 110 | 112 | 114 | 3 | 204 |
| 4 | Veronika Ivasiuk (UKR) | A | 57.30 | 88 | 90 | ~~93~~ | 2 | 105 | 108 | ~~110~~ | 6 | 198 |
| 5 | Anna Roos (SWE) | A | 57.50 | 85 | ~~87~~ | 87 | 6 | ~~110~~ | 110 | ~~114~~ | 5 | 197 |
| 6 | Dora Tchakounté (FRA) | A | 56.15 | 84 | ~~88~~ | 88 | 4 | 100 | 103 | 106 | 9 | 194 |
| 7 | Sarah Davies (GBR) | A | 57.61 | 83 | 86 | ~~88~~ | 7 | ~~106~~ | 106 | ~~109~~ | 11 | 192 |
| 8 | Jennifer Lombardo (ITA) | A | 56.46 | 83 | 85 | ~~87~~ | 8 | ~~106~~ | 106 | ~~110~~ | 10 | 191 |
| 9 | Mouna Skandi El Assad (ESP) | B | 57.49 | 82 | 84 | ~~86~~ | 11 | 102 | 105 | 107 | 8 | 191 |
| 10 | Izabella Yaylyan (ARM) | A | 57.18 | 85 | ~~89~~ | ~~89~~ | 9 | 105 | ~~110~~ | ~~110~~ | 12 | 190 |
| 11 | Konstantina Benteli (GRE) | B | 57.58 | 82 | ~~85~~ | 85 | 10 | 101 | ~~104~~ | ~~104~~ | 16 | 186 |
| 12 | Alba Sanchez Ferrer (ESP) | B | 57.69 | 80 | ~~83~~ | ~~83~~ | 15 | 102 | 105 | ~~107~~ | 12 | 185 |
| 13 | Nuray Levente (TUR) | B | 57.28 | 81 | 83 | ~~84~~ | 12 | 98 | 101 | ~~103~~ | 15 | 184 |
| 14 | Thuridur Helgadottir (ISL) | B | 57.54 | 76 | 80 | ~~83~~ | 14 | 98 | 103 | ~~105~~ | 14 | 183 |
| 15 | Jenni Puputti (FIN) | B | 57.40 | ~~83~~ | 83 | ~~85~~ | 13 | 96 | ~~100~~ | ~~100~~ | 17 | 179 |
| 16 | Tea Sojat (CRO) | B | 56.86 | ~~76~~ | 76 | ~~80~~ | 16 | 88 | 91 | ~~95~~ | 19 | 167 |
| 17 | Zekiye Nyland (NOR) | B | 57.30 | ~~67~~ | ~~70~~ | 70 | 18 | 85 | 90 | 95 | 18 | 165 |
| 18 | Cecilie Christiansen (DEN) | B | 57.53 | 67 | 70 | 72 | 17 | 82 | 85 | 88 | 20 | 160 |
| 19 | Iuliya Butkova (ISR) | B | 55.76 | 63 | ~~66~~ | 66 | 20 | 80 | ~~82~~ | ~~83~~ | 21 | 146 |
| — | Rachel Hayes (ISR) | B | 55.39 | ~~67~~ | 67 | ~~70~~ | 19 | ~~82~~ | ~~82~~ | ~~82~~ | — | — |
| — | Anastasiia Kelar (UKR) | B | 57.14 | ~~79~~ | ~~80~~ | ~~80~~ | — | 100 | ~~105~~ | 107 | 7 | — |
| — | Aleksandra Klejinowska-Krzywanska (POL) | A | 57.72 | ~~86~~ | ~~86~~ | ~~86~~ | — | 106 | 111 | ~~114~~ | 4 | — |

== Participating countries ==
List of participating countries. In total, 340 (144 female, 196 male) athletes from 40 countries participated in this championships.

- Albania (8)
- Armenia (15)
- Austria (1)
- Azerbaijan (8)
- Belarus (3)
- Belgium (2)
- Bosnia and Herzegovina (1)
- Bulgaria (12)
- Croatia (8)
- Cyprus (2)
- Czech Republic (15)
- Denmark (7)
- Estonia (2)
- Finland (15)
- France (13)
- Georgia (8)
- Germany (14)
- Great Britain (14)
- Greece (10)
- Hungary (15)
- Ireland (12)
- Iceland (3)
- Israel (13)
- Italy (15)
- Kosovo (1)
- Latvia (4)
- Lithuania (6)
- Malta (1)
- Moldova (4)
- Netherlands (2)
- Norway (12)
- Poland (15)
- Romania (9)
- Russia (13)
- Serbia (1)
- Slovakia (6)
- Spain (15)
- Sweden (8)
- Turkey (15)
- Ukraine (11)
