= Gnidenko =

Gnidenko or Hnidenko (Russian: Гниденко, Ukrainian: Гніденко) is a gender-neutral Slavic surname that may refer to:

- Dmytro Hnidenko (born 1975), Ukrainian weightlifter
- Ekaterina Gnidenko (born 1992), Russian track cyclist
