= Ionuț Ilie =

Romanian weightlifter

Personal information
- Born: 2 January 1993 (age 33)
- Weight: 61.95 kg (136.6 lb)

Sport
- Country: Romania
- Sport: Weightlifting
- Team: National team
Medal record
European Championships
Bronze medal – third place	2018 Bucharest	–62 kg
- Updated on 31 August 2016

Ionuț Ilie (born 2 January 1993) is a Romanian male weightlifter, competing in the 62 kg category and representing Romania at international competitions. He competed at world championships, including at the 2015 World Weightlifting Championships. He also competed at the 2016, and 2017 European Weightlifting Championships.

== Major results ==
Year	Venue	Weight	Snatch (kg)				Clean & Jerk (kg)				Total	Rank
Year	Venue	Weight	1	2	3	Rank	1	2	3	Rank	Total	Rank
World Championships
2015	Houston, United States	62 kg	~~122~~	122	~~126~~	28	145	150	155	19	277	23
