= Feliks Khalibekov =

Russian weightlifter

Personal information
- Born: 3 February 1990 (age 35) Khivsky District, Dagestan, Russia
- Weight: 68.86 kg (151.8 lb)

Sport
- Country: Russia
- Sport: Weightlifting
- Weight class: 69 kg, 62 kg, 67 kg
- Updated on 12 November 2016

Feliks Khalibekov (Russian: Фе́ликс Халибе́ков, born 3 February 1990) is a Russian male weightlifter, who competed in the 69 kg category and represented Russia at international competitions. He won the bronze medal in the snatch at the 2014 European Weightlifting Championships and the silver medal overall at the 2016 European Weightlifting Championships.

At the 2017 European Weightlifting Championships, Khalibekov won the bronze medal in men's 62 kg category.

== Major results ==
Year	Venue	Weight	Snatch (kg)				Clean & Jerk (kg)				Total	Rank
Year	Venue	Weight	1	2	3	Rank	1	2	3	Rank	Total	Rank
World Weightlifting Championships
2018	Ashgabat, Turkmenistan	67 kg	133	138	~~141~~	13	155	160	~~164~~	16	298	15
European Weightlifting Championships
2014	Tel Aviv, Israel	69 kg	136	140	143	3rd place, bronze medalist(s)	162	168	172	4	315	4
2016	Førde, Norway	62 kg	125	130	133	2nd place, silver medalist(s)	150	156	~~159~~	4	289	2nd place, silver medalist(s)
2017	Split, Croatia	62 kg	125	129	131	2nd place, silver medalist(s)	~~150~~	150	154	4	285	3rd place, bronze medalist(s)
2019	(Georgia (country)) Batumi, Georgia	67 kg	~~132~~	132	135	7	153	158	~~161~~	8	293	6
