= Natalia Prișcepa =

Moldovan weightlifter (born 1989)

Personal information
- Born: 17 October 1989 (age 36)
- Height: 1.68 m (5 ft 6 in)
- Weight: 74 kg (163 lb)

Sport
- Country: Moldova
- Sport: Weightlifting
- Event: Women's 75 kg
Medal record
Women's weightlifting
Representing Moldova
European Championships
Bronze medal – third place	2016 Førde	–75 kg

Natalia Prișcepa (born 17 October 1989) is a Moldovan weightlifter. She competed in the women's 75 kg event at the 2016 Summer Olympics.

== Major results ==
Year	Venue	Weight	Snatch (kg)				Clean & Jerk (kg)				Total	Rank
Year	Venue	Weight	1	2	3	Rank	1	2	3	Rank	Total	Rank
Representing Moldova
Olympic Games
2016	Rio de Janeiro, Brazil	75 kg	93	97	~~100~~	12	110	116	~~123~~	12	213	12
World Championships
2021	Tashkent, Uzbekistan	71 kg	91	94	~~96~~	12	108	~~112~~	~~112~~	22	202	21
2014	Almaty, Kazakhstan	75 kg	104	108	111	6	~~127~~	~~127~~	127	10	238	8
European Championships
2023	Yerevan, Armenia	76 kg	92	96	98	4	114	~~118~~	118	7	216	6
2022	Tirana, Albania	76 kg	92	~~95~~	95	7	111	~~115~~	115	7	210	7
2021	Moscow, Russia	71 kg	~~92~~	~~92~~	92	8	110	114	~~117~~	9	206	7
2017	Split, Croatia	75 kg	~~98~~	~~98~~	98	6	114	118	120	4	218	4
2016	Førde, Norway	75 kg	106	110	~~112~~	3rd place, bronze medalist(s)	~~124~~	126	130	3rd place, bronze medalist(s)	240	3rd place, bronze medalist(s)
2015	(Georgia (country)) Tbilisi, Georgia	75 kg	103	107	~~111~~	5	120	~~125~~	125	7	232	7
2014	Tel Aviv, Israel	75 kg	102	~~105~~	~~105~~	3rd place, bronze medalist(s)	120	127	~~130~~	4	229	4
2013	Tirana, Albania	75 kg	90	94	~~96~~	5	111	~~115~~	~~116~~	6	205	5
2012	Antalya, Turkey	75 kg	83	87	~~89~~	9	105	~~109~~	109	9	196	9
