= 2017 European Weightlifting Championships =

International weightlifting competition

- Location: Split, Croatia
- Dates: 2–8 April

The 2017 European Weightlifting Championships were held in Split, Croatia from 2 April to 8 April 2017.

== Medals tables ==
=== Results including snatch and clean & jerk medals ===
Rank	Nation	Gold	Silver	Bronze	Total
1	Russia (RUS)	10	12	8	30
2	Romania (ROU)	6	6	6	18
3	Ukraine (UKR)	5	9	3	17
4	France (FRA)	4	1	0	5
5	Armenia (ARM)	3	3	5	11
6	Poland (POL)	3	1	5	9
6	Turkey (TUR)	3	1	5	9
8	Italy (ITA)	3	1	0	4
9	Georgia (GEO)	3	0	1	4
10	Spain (ESP)	2	3	1	6
11	Latvia (LAT)	1	2	0	3
12	Albania (ALB)	1	1	2	4
13	Lithuania (LTU)	1	0	1	2
14	Belarus (BLR)	0	2	3	5
15	Bulgaria (BUL)	0	1	3	4
16	Germany (GER)	0	1	1	2
17	Austria (AUT)	0	1	0	1
17	Cyprus (CYP)	0	1	0	1
17	Estonia (EST)	0	1	0	1
17	Great Britain (GBR)	0	1	0	1
21	Hungary (HUN)	0	0	3	3
22	Belgium (BEL)	0	0	1	1
Totals (22 entries)		45	48	48	141

=== Total results ===
Rank	Nation	Gold	Silver	Bronze	Total
1	Russia (RUS)	4	4	2	10
2	Romania (ROU)	2	3	2	7
3	France (FRA)	2	0	0	2
4	Ukraine (UKR)	1	4	0	5
5	Armenia (ARM)	1	1	3	5
6	Spain (ESP)	1	1	0	2
6	Turkey (TUR)	1	1	0	2
8	Poland (POL)	1	0	3	4
9	Georgia (GEO)	1	0	0	1
9	Italy (ITA)	1	0	0	1
11	Bulgaria (BUL)	0	1	0	1
11	Latvia (LAT)	0	1	0	1
13	Belarus (BLR)	0	0	2	2
14	Albania (ALB)	0	0	1	1
14	Germany (GER)	0	0	1	1
14	Hungary (HUN)	0	0	1	1
14	Lithuania (LTU)	0	0	1	1
Totals (17 entries)		15	16	16	47

== Medal overview ==
=== Men ===
Event		Gold		Silver		Bronze	
– 56 kg	Snatch	Mirco Scarantino (ITA)	120 kg	Dominik Kozłowski (POL)	114 kg	Ilie Ciotoiu (ROU)	111 kg
– 56 kg	Clean & Jerk	Mirco Scarantino (ITA)	146 kg	Ilie Ciotoiu (ROU)	131 kg	Dominik Kozłowski (POL)	127 kg
– 56 kg	Total	Mirco Scarantino (ITA)	266 kg	Ilie Ciotoiu (ROU)	242 kg	Dominik Kozłowski (POL)	241 kg
– 62 kg	Snatch	Bünyamin Sezer (TUR)	135 kg	Feliks Khalibekov (RUS)	131 kg	Hurşit Atak (TUR)	130 kg
– 62 kg	Clean & Jerk	Hurşit Atak (TUR)	160 kg	Dimitris Minasidis (CYP)	157 kg	Stilyan Grozdev (BUL)	154 kg
– 62 kg	Total	Hurşit Atak (TUR)	290 kg	Bünyamin Sezer (TUR)	289 kg	Feliks Khalibekov (RUS)	285 kg
– 69 kg	Snatch	Oleg Chen (RUS)	150 kg	Mirko Zanni (ITA)	143 kg	Ahmet Turan Okyay (TUR)	142 kg
– 69 kg	Clean & Jerk	Bernardin Matam (FRA)	180 kg	Robert Joachim (GER)	176 kg	Briken Calja (ALB)	175 kg
– 69 kg	Total	Bernardin Matam (FRA)	320 kg	Oleg Chen (RUS)	319 kg	Robert Joachim (GER)	317 kg
– 77 kg	Snatch	Daniel Godelli (ALB)	161 kg	Dumitru Captari (ROU)	160 kg	Răzvan Martin (ROU)	158 kg
– 77 kg	Clean & Jerk	Dumitru Captari (ROU)	200 kg	Erkand Qerimaj (ALB)	193 kg	Răzvan Martin (ROU)	190 kg
– 77 kg	Total	Dumitru Captari (ROU)	360 kg	Răzvan Martin (ROU)	348 kg	Erkand Qerimaj (ALB)	348 kg
– 85 kg	Snatch	Oleksandr Pielieshenko (UKR)	175 kg	Artem Okulov (RUS)	165 kg	Pavel Khadasevich (BLR)	160 kg
– 85 kg	Clean & Jerk	Artem Okulov (RUS)	212 kg	Oleksandr Pielieshenko (UKR)	211 kg	Krzysztof Zwarycz (POL)	199 kg
– 85 kg	Total	Oleksandr Pielieshenko (UKR)	386 kg	Artem Okulov (RUS)	377 kg	Krzysztof Zwarycz (POL)	358 kg
– 94 kg	Snatch	Aurimas Didzbalis (LTU)	181 kg	Dmytro Chumak (UKR)	174 kg	Redon Manushi (FRA)	172 kg
– 94 kg	Clean & Jerk	Dmytro Chumak (UKR)	214 kg	Egor Klimonov (RUS)	213 kg	Aurimas Didzbalis (LTU)	205 kg
– 94 kg	Total	Dmytro Chumak (UKR)	388 kg	Aurimas Didzbalis (LTU)	386 kg	Egor Klimonov (RUS)	378 kg
– 105 kg	Snatch	Simon Martirosyan (ARM)	184 kg	Sargis Martirosjan (AUT)	181 kg	Vasil Gospodinov (BUL)	180 kg
– 105 kg	Clean & Jerk	Simon Martirosyan (ARM)	230 kg	David Bedzhanyan (RUS)	221 kg	Vasil Gospodinov (BUL)	217 kg
– 105 kg	Total	Simon Martirosyan (ARM)	414 kg	Vasil Gospodinov (BUL)	397 kg	Arkadiusz Michalski (POL)	387 kg
+ 105 kg	Snatch	Lasha Talakhadze (GEO)	217 kg	Gor Minasyan (ARM)	211 kg	Irakli Turmanidze (GEO)	201 kg
+ 105 kg	Clean & Jerk	Lasha Talakhadze (GEO)	250 kg	Mart Seim (EST)	246 kg	Ruben Aleksanyan (ARM)	244 kg
+ 105 kg	Total	Lasha Talakhadze (GEO)	467 kg	Gor Minasyan (ARM)	446 kg	Ruben Aleksanyan (ARM)	434 kg

=== Women ===
Event		Gold		Silver		Bronze	
– 48 kg	Snatch	Monica Csengeri (ROU)	85 kg	Anaïs Michel (FRA)	80 kg	Elena Ramona Andries (ROU)	75 kg
– 48 kg	Clean & Jerk	Anaïs Michel (FRA)	100 kg	Monica Csengeri (ROU)	94 kg	Şaziye Erdoğan (TUR)	90 kg
– 48 kg	Total	Anaïs Michel (FRA)	180 kg	Monica Csengeri (ROU)	179 kg	Elena Ramona Andries (ROU)	164 kg
– 53 kg	Snatch	Joanna Łochowska (POL)	86 kg	Atenery Hernández (ESP)	86 kg	Bediha Tunadağı (TUR)	84 kg
– 53 kg	Clean & Jerk	Joanna Łochowska (POL)	106 kg	Ludmila Pankova (BLR)	106 kg	Atenery Hernández (ESP)	105 kg
– 53 kg	Total	Joanna Łochowska (POL)	192 kg	Atenery Hernández (ESP)	191 kg	Ludmila Pankova (BLR)	189 kg
– 58 kg	Snatch	Rebeka Koha (LAT)	95 kg	Veronika Ivasiuk (UKR)	95 kg	Natalia Khlestkina (RUS)	95 kg
– 58 kg	Clean & Jerk	Natalia Khlestkina (RUS)	119 kg	Rebeka Koha (LAT)	118 kg	Sümeyye Kentli (TUR)	116 kg
– 58 kg	Total	Natalia Khlestkina (RUS)	214 kg	Rebeka Koha (LAT)	213 kg	Mădălina Bianca Molie (ROU)	208 kg
– 63 kg	Snatch	Loredana Toma (ROU)	100 kg	Tatiana Aleeva (RUS)	98 kg	Tima Turieva (RUS)	97 kg
– 63 kg	Clean & Jerk	Loredana Toma (ROU)	126 kg	Tatiana Aleeva (RUS)	125 kg	Tima Turieva (RUS)	121 kg
– 63 kg	Total	Loredana Toma (ROU)	226 kg	Tatiana Aleeva (RUS)	223 kg	Tima Turieva (RUS)	218 kg
– 69 kg	Snatch	Anastasiia Romanova (RUS)	112 kg	Rebekah Tiler (GBR)	100 kg	Mariya Khlyan (UKR)	99 kg
– 69 kg	Clean & Jerk	Anastasiia Romanova (RUS)	135 kg	Anastasiya Mikhalenka (BLR)	130 kg	Mariya Khlyan (UKR)	126 kg
– 69 kg	Total	Anastasiia Romanova (RUS)	247 kg	Mariya Khlyan (UKR)	225 kg	Anastasiya Mikhalenka (BLR)	225 kg
– 75 kg	Snatch	Iryna Dekha (UKR)	120 kg	Lydia Valentín (ESP)	115 kg	Mariia Vostrikova (RUS)	113 kg
– 75 kg	Clean & Jerk	Lydia Valentín (ESP)	137 kg	Sona Poghosyan (ARM)	126 kg	Mariia Vostrikova (RUS)	126 kg
– 75 kg	Total	Lydia Valentín (ESP)	252 kg	Mariia Vostrikova (RUS)	238 kg	Sona Poghosyan (ARM)	227 kg
– 90 kg	Snatch	Valentyna Kisil (UKR)	110 kg	Diana Mstieva (RUS)	109 kg	Tatev Hakobyan (ARM)	105 kg
– 90 kg	Clean & Jerk	Diana Mstieva (RUS)	132 kg	Valentyna Kisil (UKR)	130 kg	Anna Van Bellinghen (BEL)	127 kg
– 90 kg	Total	Diana Mstieva (RUS)	241 kg	Valentyna Kisil (UKR)	240 kg	Tatev Hakobyan (ARM)	230 kg
+ 90 kg	Snatch		~~137 kg~~	Anastasiya Lysenko (UKR)	125 kg	Krisztina Magát (HUN)	104 kg
+ 90 kg	Clean & Jerk		~~180 kg~~	Anastasiya Lysenko (UKR)	152 kg	Krisztina Magát (HUN)	130 kg
+ 90 kg	Total		~~317 kg~~	Anastasiya Lysenko (UKR)	277 kg	Krisztina Magát (HUN)	234 kg

== Men's results ==
=== Men's 56 kg ===
Rank	Athlete	Group	Body weight	Snatch (kg)				Clean & Jerk (kg)				Total
Rank	Athlete	Group	Body weight	1	2	3	Rank	1	2	3	Rank	Total
1st place, gold medalist(s)	Mirco Scarantino (ITA)	A	55.90	114	117	120	1	140	146	—	1	266
2nd place, silver medalist(s)	Ilie Constantin Ciotoiu (ROU)	A	56.00	108	111	~~115~~	3	~~131~~	131	~~140~~	2	242
3rd place, bronze medalist(s)	Dominik Kozłowski (POL)	A	55.75	111	114	~~116~~	2	~~124~~	124	127	3	241
4	Muammer Şahin (TUR)	A	55.95	110	~~115~~	~~116~~	4	120	126	~~130~~	4	236
5	Okan Yılmaz (TUR)	A	55.90	~~103~~	103	~~106~~	5	125	~~131~~	~~132~~	5	228
6	Georgije Bogojevic (CRO)	B	55.05	60	65	~~70~~	6	90	~~95~~	95	6	160
	Josué Brachi (ESP)	A	55.65	~~118~~	~~118~~	~~118~~	—	—	—	—	—	—
	Florin Croitoru (ROU)	A	55.85	~~107~~	—	—	—	—	—	—	—	—
DQ	Iuri Dudoglo (MDA)	A	55.75	~~114~~	115	~~118~~	—	135	146	~~152~~	—	—

=== Men's 62 kg ===
Rank	Athlete	Group	Body weight	Snatch (kg)				Clean & Jerk (kg)				Total
Rank	Athlete	Group	Body weight	1	2	3	Rank	1	2	3	Rank	Total
1st place, gold medalist(s)	Hurşit Atak (TUR)	A	62.00	125	128	130	3	160	~~165~~	~~170~~	1	290
2nd place, silver medalist(s)	Bünyamin Sezer (TUR)	A	62.00	130	132	135	1	151	~~153~~	154	5	289
3rd place, bronze medalist(s)	Feliks Khalibekov (RUS)	A	61.95	125	129	131	2	~~150~~	150	154	4	285
4	Dimitris Minasidis (CYP)	A	61.90	~~125~~	~~125~~	126	7	151	157	~~160~~	2	283
5	Ionuț Ilie (ROU)	A	61.85	123	126	129	4	~~150~~	~~150~~	151	7	280
6	Vladimir Urumov (BUL)	A	61.90	123	~~126~~	127	5	~~150~~	153	~~159~~	6	280
7	Stilyan Grozdev (BUL)	A	61.85	123	126	~~128~~	6	150	154	~~158~~	3	280
8	Ramini Shamilishvili (GEO)	A	61.95	117	121	123	9	140	144	147	8	270
9	Arberi Cerciz (ALB)	B	61.30	~~117~~	117	125	8	137	~~145~~	~~145~~	10	262
10	Romario Avdiraj (ALB)	B	61.85	~~111~~	111	~~120~~	10	142	~~150~~	~~150~~	9	253

=== Men's 69 kg ===
Rank	Athlete	Group	Body weight	Snatch (kg)				Clean & Jerk (kg)				Total
Rank	Athlete	Group	Body weight	1	2	3	Rank	1	2	3	Rank	Total
1st place, gold medalist(s)	Bernardin Matam (FRA)	A	68.75	140	~~143~~	~~144~~	5	174	180	—	1	320
2nd place, silver medalist(s)	Oleg Chen (RUS)	A	68.85	~~145~~	145	150	1	162	~~168~~	169	6	319
3rd place, bronze medalist(s)	Robert Joachim (GER)	A	68.85	134	138	141	4	167	172	176	2	317
4	David Sanchez (ESP)	A	68.95	135	140	~~143~~	6	169	~~173~~	173	4	313
5	Ahmet Turan Okyay (TUR)	A	68.90	135	~~141~~	142	3	156	162	170	5	312
6	Mirko Zanni (ITA)	A	68.00	135	~~140~~	143	2	155	162	~~170~~	11	305
7	Petr Petrov (CZE)	A	68.85	132	136	~~139~~	9	164	~~169~~	169	7	305
8	Serghei Cechir (MDA)	A	68.85	136	140	~~144~~	7	163	~~169~~	~~170~~	9	303
9	Damian Wiśniewski (POL)	B	68.60	130	~~134~~	135	10	160	166	~~168~~	8	301
10	Víctor Castro (ESP)	B	68.65	130	135	138	8	155	~~162~~	162	12	300
11	Zlatko Minchev (BUL)	A	69.00	~~133~~	133	~~135~~	11	~~160~~	160	~~165~~	13	293
12	Dian Minchev (BUL)	A	68.85	~~128~~	~~130~~	130	12	162	~~169~~	~~170~~	10	292
13	Tim Kring (DEN)	B	68.75	125	~~129~~	129	13	152	~~156~~	156	14	285
14	Arbnor Krasniqi (KOS)	B	68.90	94	98	~~102~~	14	119	~~122~~	~~122~~	16	217
	Briken Calja (ALB)	A	69.00	~~145~~	~~145~~	~~145~~	—	170	175	~~178~~	3	—
	Ivan Knez (CRO)	B	68.60	~~90~~	~~90~~	~~90~~	—	115	120	~~123~~	15	—

=== Men's 77 kg ===
Rank	Athlete	Group	Body weight	Snatch (kg)				Clean & Jerk (kg)				Total
Rank	Athlete	Group	Body weight	1	2	3	Rank	1	2	3	Rank	Total
1st place, gold medalist(s)	Dumitru Captari (ROU)	B	76.85	150	155	160	2	190	195	200	1	360
2nd place, silver medalist(s)	Răzvan Martin (ROU)	A	76.75	150	155	158	3	185	190	~~194~~	3	348
3rd place, bronze medalist(s)	Erkand Qerimaj (ALB)	A	76.85	155	~~158~~	~~158~~	6	~~188~~	~~190~~	193	2	348
4	Daniel Godelli (ALB)	A	76.40	~~156~~	~~158~~	161	1	186	~~191~~	~~192~~	6	347
5	Max Lang (GER)	A	76.20	150	154	156	5	178	184	188	4	344
6	Vadzim Likharad (BLR)	A	76.55	153	157	~~159~~	4	180	185	~~192~~	7	342
7	Andrés Eduardo Mata (ESP)	A	76.75	~~145~~	145	150	9	187	~~193~~	~~194~~	5	337
8	Ritvars Suharevs (LAT)	B	76.60	145	150	~~154~~	8	175	180	185	8	335
9	Sergei Petrov (RUS)	A	75.15	145	151	~~154~~	7	175	180	~~185~~	10	331
10	Nico Müller (GER)	A	76.70	143	148	~~151~~	10	178	~~183~~	~~183~~	12	326
11	Andrei Birca (MDA)	B	76.75	~~140~~	140	145	12	175	~~181~~	~~181~~	13	320
12	Alejandro Gonzales (ESP)	B	76.65	135	140	~~145~~	14	170	~~175~~	180	11	320
13	Giorgi Lomtadze (GEO)	B	76.70	140	144	146	11	165	~~170~~	~~170~~	14	311
14	Emmanouil Marianakis (GRE)	B	76.75	142	~~146~~	~~146~~	13	160	~~165~~	165	15	307
15	Ervin Rozsnyik (SRB)	B	76.50	125	130	136	15	160	~~166~~	~~166~~	16	296
16	Martynas Sasnauskas (LTU)	B	76.20	130	~~135~~	~~135~~	16	155	160	~~166~~	17	290
17	Luka Smajila (SLO)	B	76.10	112	116	~~119~~	17	140	~~145~~	145	18	261
18	Nermin Zecic (BIH)	B	74.60	105	109	~~113~~	18	130	136	140	19	249
	Yunder Beytula (BUL)	A	77.00	~~146~~	~~146~~	~~146~~	—	180	~~189~~	~~189~~	9	—
DQ	Alexandr Spac (MDA)	B	76.60	140	145	148	—	175	~~180~~	181	—	—

=== Men's 85 kg ===
Rank	Athlete	Group	Body weight	Snatch (kg)				Clean & Jerk (kg)				Total
Rank	Athlete	Group	Body weight	1	2	3	Rank	1	2	3	Rank	Total
1st place, gold medalist(s)	Oleksandr Pielieshenko (UKR)	A	84.55	~~170~~	170	175	1	202	~~211~~	211	2	386
2nd place, silver medalist(s)	Artem Okulov (RUS)	A	84.90	165	~~170~~	~~170~~	2	198	203	212	1	377
3rd place, bronze medalist(s)	Krzysztof Zwarycz (POL)	A	85.00	159	~~164~~	~~166~~	5	190	195	199	3	358
4	Pavel Khadasevich (BLR)	A	84.60	160	~~164~~	~~164~~	3	185	191	196	5	356
5	Tom Schwarzbach (GER)	A	84.60	150	154	156	8	190	196	~~201~~	4	352
6	Krenar Shoraj (ALB)	B	84.25	145	150	156	7	186	~~191~~	192	7	348
7	Michael Müller (GER)	A	84.50	149	153	157	6	~~188~~	188	~~196~~	9	345
8	Karol Samko (SVK)	B	84.90	142	147	150	11	191	195	~~199~~	6	345
9	Romain Imadouchène (FRA)	A	84.55	~~152~~	152	~~157~~	9	187	~~194~~	~~194~~	10	339
10	Brandon Vautard (FRA)	B	84.40	143	~~148~~	~~148~~	14	180	~~190~~	190	8	333
11	Milko Tokola (FIN)	B	85.00	145	~~149~~	150	12	172	180	—	11	330
12	Andranik Karapetyan (ARM)	B	82.15	145	155	160	4	155	165	~~175~~	18	325
13	Richard Tkáč (SVK)	B	83.95	140	~~145~~	145	13	175	180	~~186~~	12	325
14	Ermand Tabaku (ALB)	B	84.70	143	~~146~~	~~147~~	14	173	176	~~178~~	15	319
15	Turgay Besler (TUR)	B	85.00	~~140~~	140	~~145~~	16	162	170	177	13	317
16	IIrmantas Kačinskas (LTU)	B	84.30	140	~~145~~	~~146~~	15	165	171	177	14	317
17	Seán Brown (IRL)	B	84.30	132	136	140	18	162	166	170	16	310
18	Jesse Nykänen (FIN)	B	84.60	135	~~138~~	~~138~~	19	163	~~169~~	170	17	305
	Amar Musić (CRO)	A	84.70	150	~~153~~	~~153~~	10	~~184~~	~~184~~	~~184~~	—	—
	Ivan Markov (BUL)	A	84.75	~~168~~	~~168~~	~~168~~	—	—	—	—	—	—
DQ	Maksim Mudreuski (BLR)	A	84.65	156	~~161~~	~~161~~	—	~~185~~	~~185~~	~~185~~	—	—

=== Men's 94 kg ===
Rank	Athlete	Group	Body weight	Snatch (kg)				Clean & Jerk (kg)				Total
Rank	Athlete	Group	Body weight	1	2	3	Rank	1	2	3	Rank	Total
1st place, gold medalist(s)	Dmytro Chumak (UKR)	A	93.55	170	174	~~178~~	2	207	210	214	1	388
2nd place, silver medalist(s)	Aurimas Didzbalis (LTU)	A	93.50	173	177	181	1	205	~~213~~	~~215~~	3	386
3rd place, bronze medalist(s)	Egor Klimonov (RUS)	A	94.00	~~165~~	165	~~170~~	10	205	~~213~~	213	2	378
4	Jürgen Spieß (GER)	A	93.45	165	170	173	3	200	~~207~~	~~209~~	7	373
5	Aliaksandr Bersanau (BLR)	A	93.00	~~165~~	166	~~171~~	7	200	205	~~212~~	5	371
6	Yaroslav Viter (UKR)	B	92.80	160	165	~~168~~	9	200	205	~~210~~	4	370
7	Ibrahim Arat (TUR)	A	93.80	~~163~~	~~166~~	166	8	202	~~211~~	~~213~~	6	368
8	Georgi Shikov (BUL)	A	93.95	163	167	170	6	195	~~201~~	~~201~~	10	365
9	Łukasz Grela (POL)	A	93.95	170	~~174~~	~~176~~	5	195	~~201~~	~~201~~	11	365
10	Redon Manushi (FRA)	B	92.85	167	172	~~175~~	4	~~185~~	185	190	13	362
11	Karush Ghukasyan (ARM)	B	93.90	160	~~165~~	~~165~~	12	190	200	~~207~~	8	360
12	Nicolae Onica (ROU)	A	93.30	160	~~166~~	~~166~~	11	~~200~~	200	~~206~~	9	360
13	Endri Karina (ALB)	B	93.65	155	160	~~165~~	13	185	~~190~~	~~190~~	17	345
14	Eero Retulainen (FIN)	B	93.85	146	~~150~~	150	15	184	~~189~~	189	14	339
15	Sonny Webster (GBR)	B	93.70	148	~~153~~	~~154~~	16	~~189~~	~~189~~	189	15	337
16	Vadims Kozevnikovs (LAT)	B	91.85	142	147	~~150~~	17	188	~~193~~	~~193~~	16	335
17	Miika Antti-Roiko (FIN)	B	93.80	~~140~~	140	—	21	185	190	~~200~~	12	330
18	Milos Zivkovic (AUT)	C	93.20	~~140~~	140	147	18	~~170~~	174	~~178~~	19	321
19	Artur Mugurdumov (ISR)	C	93.90	137	142	146	19	173	175	~~178~~	18	321
20	Gábor Vaspöri (HUN)	C	93.95	140	144	~~147~~	20	~~172~~	~~173~~	174	20	318
21	Alexandros Amanatidis (CYP)	C	92.85	128	~~133~~	135	22	161	166	~~171~~	21	301
22	Adam Mesaros (CRO)	C	93.85	120	125	~~130~~	24	160	~~165~~	165	22	290
	Ivan Perasovic (CRO)	C	92.75	120	125	130	23	~~145~~	~~145~~	~~145~~	—	—
	Leho Pent (EST)	B	93.25	155	~~160~~	~~162~~	14	—	—	—	—	—
DQ	Adam Maligov (RUS)	A	92.75	172	176	180	—	208	~~215~~	—	—	—

=== Men's 105 kg ===
Rank	Athlete	Group	Body weight	Snatch (kg)				Clean & Jerk (kg)				Total
Rank	Athlete	Group	Body weight	1	2	3	Rank	1	2	3	Rank	Total
1st place, gold medalist(s)	Simon Martirosyan (ARM)	A	104.90	184	~~190~~	~~190~~	1	~~220~~	220	230	1	414
2nd place, silver medalist(s)	Vasil Gospodinov (BUL)	A	103.35	175	180	~~183~~	3	212	217	~~225~~	3	397
3rd place, bronze medalist(s)	Arkadiusz Michalski (POL)	A	105.00	170	~~174~~	~~175~~	6	210	~~217~~	217	4	387
4	Sargis Martirosjan (AUT)	A	104.55	~~179~~	~~181~~	181	2	205	~~210~~	~~210~~	8	386
5	Kostiantyn Reva (UKR)	A	104.70	~~165~~	165	~~172~~	10	201	208	216	5	381
6	Mikhail Audzeyeu (BLR)	A	104.70	173	~~176~~	176	4	198	~~203~~	203	9	379
7	Samvel Gasparyan (ARM)	A	102.65	160	165	~~170~~	9	205	210	~~212~~	6	375
8	Vasyl Pylypenko (UKR)	A	104.75	~~165~~	~~165~~	165	11	200	208	~~211~~	7	373
9	Przemysław Budek (POL)	A	104.55	165	170	~~173~~	7	201	~~206~~	~~208~~	10	371
10	Matej Kováč (SVK)	B	104.80	161	167	170	8	195	200	~~205~~	12	370
11	Arnas Sidiskis (LTU)	B	104.55	157	163	~~166~~	12	188	193	197	14	360
12	Nenad Kuzic (SRB)	B	103.95	160	~~165~~	~~166~~	13	200	~~205~~	~~205~~	11	360
13	Resul Elvan (TUR)	B	105.00	151	156	~~162~~	16	~~190~~	190	200	13	356
14	Sergej Lichovoj (LTU)	B	104.35	155	160	~~164~~	14	188	193	~~197~~	15	353
15	Philipp Forster (AUT)	B	104.75	150	155	~~160~~	17	185	192	~~197~~	16	347
16	Jiri Gasior (CZE)	B	103.40	~~147~~	147	150	19	182	187	190	17	340
17	Patrik Krywult (CZE)	B	103.95	150	155	158	15	180	—	—	18	338
18	Kimmo Lehtikangas (FIN)	C	97.45	143	~~147~~	147	20	170	178	~~183~~	19	325
19	Mikkel Andersen (DEN)	C	104.80	143	~~147~~	~~148~~	22	170	~~175~~	~~175~~	20	313
20	Simon Keartland (IRL)	C	104.75	128	~~132~~	~~132~~	23	154	160	~~160~~	21	288
	David Bedzhanyan (RUS)	A	104.50	~~170~~	~~170~~	~~172~~	—	213	221	~~231~~	2	—
	Marcos Ruiz (ESP)	A	104.40	175	~~181~~	~~181~~	5	~~203~~	~~203~~	~~203~~	—	—
	Stefan Agren (SWE)	C	104.50	154	~~159~~	~~159~~	18	~~192~~	~~192~~	~~192~~	—	—
	Roni Peltonen (FIN)	C	104.90	144	~~149~~	~~149~~	21	~~176~~	~~178~~	~~178~~	—	—

=== Men's +105 kg ===
Rank	Athlete	Group	Body weight	Snatch (kg)				Clean & Jerk (kg)				Total
Rank	Athlete	Group	Body weight	1	2	3	Rank	1	2	3	Rank	Total
1st place, gold medalist(s)	Lasha Talakhadze (GEO)	A	158.10	203	210	217	1	238	245	250	1	467
2nd place, silver medalist(s)	Gor Minasyan (ARM)	A	141.85	200	205	211	2	235	~~240~~	~~240~~	5	446
3rd place, bronze medalist(s)	Ruben Aleksanyan (ARM)	A	151.15	~~190~~	190	~~195~~	6	240	244	~~247~~	3	434
4	Ruslan Albegov (RUS)	A	159.20	186	192	196	4	237	~~243~~	~~245~~	4	433
5	Mart Seim (EST)	A	149.75	180	~~185~~	~~185~~	9	235	242	246	2	426
6	Péter Nagy (HUN)	A	157.20	176	181	~~185~~	8	215	220	224	6	405
7	Kamil Kučera (CZE)	A	141.00	175	180	~~185~~	10	217	222	~~226~~	7	402
8	Aliksei Mzhachyk (BLR)	B	135.15	175	182	~~190~~	7	210	218	~~223~~	8	400
9	Daniel Dołęga (POL)	A	124.70	175	~~180~~	180	11	213	~~221~~	~~222~~	11	393
10	Igor Olshanetskyi (ISR)	B	131.90	160	166	170	15	205	211	216	9	386
11	Tamaš Kajdoči (SRB)	B	145.95	167	~~174~~	~~174~~	16	210	215	~~220~~	10	382
12	Ante Vukovic (CRO)	B	135.45	167	171	~~173~~	14	195	~~202~~	202	14	373
13	Roman Vasylevskyi (UKR)	B	107.45	166	~~172~~	172	13	195	200	~~203~~	15	372
14	Ondrej Kružel (SVK)	B	115.70	160	~~165~~	166	17	200	204	~~208~~	12	370
15	David Litvinov (ISR)	B	118.75	165	~~170~~	~~171~~	18	190	~~201~~	202	13	367
16	Radoslav Tatarčík (SVK)	B	111.15	169	173	~~175~~	12	182	187	~~190~~	20	360
17	Andri Gunnarsson (ISL)	C	129.20	150	160	~~165~~	19	185	195	~~200~~	16	355
18	Vincas Šlevinskis (LTU)	C	126.75	150	~~156~~	156	20	185	190	~~195~~	19	346
19	Tivadar Kajdoči (SRB)	C	129.95	140	145	150	21	185	190	~~195~~	18	340
20	Teemu Roininen (FIN)	C	136.50	~~147~~	~~147~~	147	22	190	~~196~~	—	17	337
21	Deivydas Jucius (LTU)	C	128.80	140	~~147~~	~~147~~	23	177	~~180~~	—	21	317
22	Silvio Bijelić (CRO)	C	145.40	~~130~~	130	135	24	160	175	—	22	310
23	Kieran Mifsud (MLT)	C	106.35	121	~~126~~	127	25	155	~~160~~	160	23	287
	Irakli Turmanidze (GEO)	A	135.35	190	197	201	3	—	—	—	—	—
	Oleg Proshak (UKR)	A	127.20	185	190	~~195~~	5	~~220~~	~~220~~	~~220~~	—	—

== Women's results ==
=== Women's 48 kg ===
Rank	Athlete	Group	Body weight	Snatch (kg)				Clean & Jerk (kg)				Total
Rank	Athlete	Group	Body weight	1	2	3	Rank	1	2	3	Rank	Total
1st place, gold medalist(s)	Anaïs Michel (FRA)	A	47.80	76	78	80	2	95	100	—	1	180
2nd place, silver medalist(s)	Monica Csengeri (ROU)	A	47.85	80	83	85	1	~~94~~	94	~~97~~	2	179
3rd place, bronze medalist(s)	Elena Ramona Andries (ROU)	A	47.60	72	~~75~~	75	3	~~89~~	89	~~92~~	4	164
4	Şaziye Erdoğan (TUR)	A	47.70	72	~~75~~	~~75~~	5	90	~~93~~	~~93~~	3	162
5	Alessandra Pagliaro (ITA)	A	46.55	67	70	73	4	83	86	~~90~~	6	159
6	Gamze Karakol (TUR)	A	47.85	68	70	~~73~~	6	~~88~~	88	~~92~~	5	158
7	Agnieszka Zacharek (POL)	A	47.80	67	~~69~~	70	7	85	~~89~~	~~89~~	8	155
8	Maria Pipiliaridou (GRE)	A	47.85	~~62~~	62	66	8	83	~~86~~	86	7	152
9	Tijana Stevanović (SRB)	B	47.70	~~62~~	~~63~~	63	10	74	76	79	9	142
10	Sonja Haapaniemi (FIN)	B	47.85	59	61	63	9	~~74~~	74	~~77~~	10	137
11	Tihana Majer (CRO)	B	48.00	~~55~~	55	~~60~~	11	70	~~76~~	~~77~~	11	125
12	Alexandria Craig (IRL)	B	47.05	51	53	55	12	62	64	66	12	121

=== Women's 53 kg ===
Rank	Athlete	Group	Body weight	Snatch (kg)				Clean & Jerk (kg)				Total
Rank	Athlete	Group	Body weight	1	2	3	Rank	1	2	3	Rank	Total
1st place, gold medalist(s)	Joanna Łochowska (POL)	A	52.75	84	86	~~89~~	1	104	106	—	1	192
2nd place, silver medalist(s)	Atenery Hernández (ESP)	A	52.65	82	84	86	2	102	~~105~~	105	3	191
3rd place, bronze medalist(s)	Ludmila Pankova (BLR)	A	52.85	78	81	83	4	99	103	106	2	189
4	Evagjelia Veli (ALB)	A	52.75	~~80~~	~~81~~	82	5	100	~~104~~	~~104~~	5	182
5	Giorgia Russo (ITA)	A	52.45	73	~~76~~	76	8	97	101	~~105~~	4	177
6	Sarah Hovden Øvsthus (NOR)	A	52.50	76	78	~~80~~	6	94	97	~~99~~	6	175
7	Rebekka Tao Jacobsen (NOR)	B	52.80	70	72	74	10	91	93	95	7	169
8	Noelia Garcia (ESP)	B	52.55	74	76	~~78~~	7	89	~~92~~	92	8	168
9	Aksana Zalatarova (ISR)	B	52.95	73	~~76~~	76	9	90	~~93~~	~~93~~	9	166
10	Pauliina Lagerkrans (FIN)	A	52.30	~~71~~	~~71~~	72	12	88	~~91~~	~~91~~	10	160
11	Katrhine Bruhn (DEN)	B	52.50	65	69	72	11	83	87	~~89~~	11	159
12	Rachel Hayes (ISR)	B	52.50	~~65~~	65	~~68~~	13	80	84	~~87~~	12	149
13	Evita Talahatu (NED)	B	52.75	58	~~62~~	~~62~~	14	76	79	~~82~~	13	137
14	Eithne Harte (IRL)	B	52.65	~~57~~	57	~~59~~	15	72	76	79	14	136
	Bediha Tunadağı (TUR)	A	52.40	~~83~~	84	~~87~~	3	~~104~~	~~104~~	~~105~~	—	—

=== Women's 58 kg ===
Rank	Athlete	Group	Body weight	Snatch (kg)				Clean & Jerk (kg)				Total
Rank	Athlete	Group	Body weight	1	2	3	Rank	1	2	3	Rank	Total
1st place, gold medalist(s)	Natalia Khlestkina (RUS)	A	57.75	92	~~95~~	95	3	114	117	119	1	214
2nd place, silver medalist(s)	Rebeka Koha (LAT)	A	57.25	92	95	~~97~~	1	110	114	118	2	213
3rd place, bronze medalist(s)	Mădălina Bianca Molie (ROU)	B	57.95	91	94	~~96~~	4	110	~~114~~	114	4	208
4	Veronika Ivasiuk (UKR)	A	57.90	90	93	95	2	106	111	~~115~~	9	206
5	Irina Lepșa (ROU)	A	57.95	90	93	~~95~~	5	113	~~117~~	~~117~~	5	206
6	Alba Sánchez (ESP)	A	57.65	86	~~89~~	89	7	110	~~113~~	113	7	202
7	Sümeyye Kentli (TUR)	A	57.90	~~83~~	83	86	10	114	116	~~119~~	3	202
8	Angelica Roos (SWE)	A	57.65	85	87	88	8	109	113	~~115~~	6	201
9	Katarzyna Kraska (POL)	A	57.55	85	~~87~~	~~87~~	11	~~112~~	~~113~~	113	8	198
10	Mouna Skandi (ESP)	B	57.75	82	85	~~88~~	12	105	109	~~113~~	10	194
11	Konstantina Benteli (GRE)	A	57.90	86	~~90~~	~~90~~	9	100	106	~~109~~	12	192
12	Anastasiia Ivanova (RUS)	A	57.70	85	89	~~92~~	6	102	~~107~~	~~107~~	15	191
13	Ayşegül Çakın (TUR)	B	57.80	81	~~84~~	~~84~~	14	105	107	109	11	190
14	Darya Tseveleva (BLR)	B	57.45	83	~~87~~	~~87~~	13	103	106	—	14	189
15	Tea Šojat (CRO)	B	57.25	75	~~77~~	~~77~~	15	85	88	~~92~~	18	163
16	Nastasja Štesl (SLO)	B	57.00	66	~~69~~	71	16	~~86~~	86	90	17	161
17	Dimitra Ioannou (CYP)	B	57.70	65	70	~~72~~	17	80	~~85~~	~~85~~	20	150
18	Hilary Riordan (IRL)	B	57.10	63	65	~~68~~	18	81	84	~~86~~	19	149
19	Neta Bronstein (ISR)	B	57.45	60	64	~~67~~	19	~~80~~	80	~~83~~	21	144
20	Lucija Gračanin (CRO)	B	54.45	50	52	54	20	60	62	64	22	118
	Izabella Yaylyan (ARM)	A	57.70	~~87~~	~~87~~	~~87~~	—	101	106	—	13	—
	Laura Liukkonen (FIN)	B	57.50	~~76~~	~~76~~	~~77~~	—	96	101	~~105~~	16	—

=== Women's 63 kg ===
Rank	Athlete	Group	Body weight	Snatch (kg)				Clean & Jerk (kg)				Total
Rank	Athlete	Group	Body weight	1	2	3	Rank	1	2	3	Rank	Total
1st place, gold medalist(s)	Loredana Toma (ROU)	A	62.65	100	~~104~~	~~104~~	1	121	126	~~130~~	1	226
2nd place, silver medalist(s)	Tatiana Aleeva (RUS)	A	62.95	95	~~98~~	98	2	120	~~124~~	125	2	223
3rd place, bronze medalist(s)	Tima Turieva (RUS)	A	62.75	97	~~101~~	~~101~~	3	121	~~127~~	~~127~~	3	218
4	Florina Sorina Hulpan (ROU)	A	63.00	~~90~~	91	96	4	110	114	117	5	213
5	Sarah Davies (GBR)	A	62.55	~~87~~	87	90	8	112	115	118	4	208
6	Mariia Tymoshchuk (UKR)	A	62.05	87	90	92	6	105	109	~~113~~	7	201
7	Anni Vuohijoki (FIN)	A	62.75	90	~~92~~	~~92~~	7	~~111~~	111	~~116~~	6	201
8	Irene Martinez (ESP)	B	62.65	92	95	~~98~~	5	105	~~108~~	~~108~~	10	200
9	Ine Andersson (NOR)	B	62.45	83	~~86~~	87	9	103	106	~~108~~	9	193
10	Saara Leskinen (FIN)	A	62.40	84	~~88~~	~~88~~	12	98	~~107~~	107	8	191
11	Aliaksandra Tsiatsiorkina (BLR)	B	61.55	80	84	86	10	100	104	~~107~~	11	190
12	Ohman Marina (ISR)	B	63.00	80	83	85	11	93	96	98	14	183
13	Thuridur Erla Helgadottir (ISL)	B	58.65	79	~~83~~	~~83~~	13	102	~~106~~	~~107~~	12	181
14	Ivana Horna (SVK)	B	62.65	70	74	77	15	95	99	~~103~~	13	176
15	Yasmin Zammit Stevens (MLT)	B	62.85	73	~~76~~	76	16	90	~~93~~	~~93~~	16	166
16	Alexandra Klatsia (CYP)	B	62.00	71	~~74~~	~~74~~	20	90	95	~~98~~	15	166
17	Amanda Simonsen (DEN)	B	62.65	77	~~80~~	~~80~~	14	86	~~89~~	~~91~~	20	163
18	Laura Lozová (CZE)	B	62.15	70	72	~~75~~	17	89	~~92~~	~~92~~	18	161
19	Aoife MacNeill (IRL)	B	62.55	71	~~74~~	~~74~~	19	90	~~93~~	~~93~~	17	161
20	Sarit Kalo (ISR)	B	62.00	66	70	72	18	88	~~91~~	~~91~~	19	160

=== Women's 69 kg ===
Rank	Athlete	Group	Body weight	Snatch (kg)				Clean & Jerk (kg)				Total
Rank	Athlete	Group	Body weight	1	2	3	Rank	1	2	3	Rank	Total
1st place, gold medalist(s)	Anastasiia Romanova (RUS)	A	68.95	103	107	112	1	125	131	135	1	247
2nd place, silver medalist(s)	Mariya Khlyan (UKR)	A	68.70	96	~~99~~	99	3	120	124	126	3	225
3rd place, bronze medalist(s)	Anastasiya Mikhalenka (BLR)	A	68.60	95	~~99~~	~~99~~	8	122	127	130	2	225
4	Rebekah Tiler (GBR)	A	68.30	93	96	100	2	120	~~124~~	124	4	224
5	Romela Begaj (ALB)	A	67.45	98	~~101~~	~~101~~	4	~~121~~	121	~~125~~	6	219
6	Patricia Strenius (SWE)	A	68.75	93	96	~~98~~	7	118	123	~~126~~	5	219
7	Hanna Panova (UKR)	A	67.70	90	94	97	6	~~115~~	115	~~119~~	8	212
8	Emily Godley (GBR)	B	67.55	87	90	92	10	112	~~117~~	117	7	209
9	Beáta Jung (HUN)	A	68.60	93	~~97~~	98	5	105	~~110~~	~~112~~	10	203
10	Ana de Gregorio (ESP)	B	68.00	85	89	~~92~~	11	105	109	112	9	201
11	Maria Emma Lopez (ESP)	B	67.95	85	89	92	9	105	~~109~~	~~109~~	11	197
12	Victoria Hahn (AUT)	B	69.00	~~82~~	~~82~~	84	12	98	~~103~~	—	13	182
13	Nora Jäggi (SUI)	B	67.85	75	80	~~85~~	14	93	98	102	12	182
14	Eliška Pudivítrová (CZE)	B	66.70	75	79	81	13	90	~~94~~	94	14	175
15	Monique Kleinstapel (NED)	B	68.10	~~76~~	76	~~80~~	15	~~90~~	~~90~~	90	15	166
16	Ivana Rumenovic (CRO)	B	64.05	~~50~~	50	~~58~~	16	60	65	~~67~~	16	115

=== Women's 75 kg ===
Rank	Athlete	Group	Body weight	Snatch (kg)				Clean & Jerk (kg)				Total
Rank	Athlete	Group	Body weight	1	2	3	Rank	1	2	3	Rank	Total
1st place, gold medalist(s)	Lydia Valentín (ESP)	A	74.90	112	115	~~118~~	2	132	137	—	1	252
2nd place, silver medalist(s)	Mariia Vostrikova (RUS)	A	71.55	105	110	113	3	125	~~129~~	~~129~~	3	238
3rd place, bronze medalist(s)	Sona Poghosyan (ARM)	A	73.40	98	~~101~~	101	4	122	126	~~128~~	2	227
4	Natalia Prișcepa (MDA)	A	74.90	~~98~~	~~98~~	98	6	114	118	120	4	218
5	Jolanta Wiór (POL)	A	73.15	~~95~~	95	~~97~~	9	114	118	119	5	214
6	Meri Ilmarinen (FIN)	A	74.75	93	97	~~100~~	7	115	~~118~~	~~118~~	8	212
7	Carlotta Brunelli (ITA)	B	74.65	93	97	~~100~~	8	113	116	~~119~~	7	213
8	Marianne Saarhelo (FIN)	A	71.45	88	92	~~95~~	10	113	118	~~121~~	6	210
9	Julie Švecová (CZE)	B	69.50	74	77	80	12	86	89	~~92~~	8	169
10	Hermana Dermiček (CRO)	B	69.30	50	53	55	13	60	65	67	9	122
	Iryna Dekha (UKR)	A	74.70	114	117	120	1	~~137~~	~~137~~	~~137~~	—	—
	Rabia Kaya (TUR)	A	74.85	93	~~97~~	98	5	~~122~~	~~122~~	~~122~~	—	—
	Simona Hertlová (CZE)	B	69.05	82	86	~~89~~	11	~~100~~	~~100~~	~~100~~	—	—

=== Women's 90 kg ===
Rank	Athlete	Group	Body weight	Snatch (kg)				Clean & Jerk (kg)				Total
Rank	Athlete	Group	Body weight	1	2	3	Rank	1	2	3	Rank	Total
1st place, gold medalist(s)	Diana Mstieva (RUS)	A	89.70	104	~~108~~	109	2	126	129	132	1	241
2nd place, silver medalist(s)	Valentyna Kisil (UKR)	A	86.70	105	108	110	1	124	127	130	2	240
3rd place, bronze medalist(s)	Tatev Hakobyan (ARM)	A	81.25	100	105	~~108~~	3	~~121~~	121	125	4	230
4	Anna Van Bellinghen (BEL)	A	85.20	102	~~106~~	~~107~~	4	122	127	~~129~~	3	229
5	Małgorzata Wiejak (POL)	A	79.45	98	~~101~~	101	5	120	124	~~128~~	5	225
6	Nina Schroth (GER)	A	79.00	94	~~98~~	98	6	112	116	119	6	217
7	Bianka Bazso (HUN)	B	80.15	86	90	93	7	112	116	~~118~~	7	209
8	Timea Szuromi (HUN)	B	76.00	86	89	~~92~~	9	107	~~111~~	111	8	200
9	Nicole Rubanovich (ISR)	B	75.10	~~88~~	88	92	8	100	104	107	10	199
10	Ayşe Seven (TUR)	B	86.55	70	77	~~80~~	12	103	108	~~111~~	9	185
11	Louise Vennekilde (DEN)	B	89.90	~~78~~	78	83	10	100	~~104~~	~~105~~	12	183
12	Mihaela Kruljac (CRO)	B	75.45	76	~~79~~	79	11	96	101	103	11	182
13	Karmen Budiša (CRO)	B	77.30	50	55	~~60~~	13	60	~~66~~	~~68~~	13	115

=== Women's +90 kg ===
Rank	Athlete	Group	Body weight	Snatch (kg)				Clean & Jerk (kg)				Total
Rank	Athlete	Group	Body weight	1	2	3	Rank	1	2	3	Rank	Total
DQ	Tatiana Kashirina (RUS)	A	107.05	132	137	~~140~~	1	168	178	180	1	317
2nd place, silver medalist(s)	Anastasiya Lysenko (UKR)	A	104.00	115	120	125	2	136	144	152	2	277
3rd place, bronze medalist(s)	Krisztina Magát (HUN)	A	103.00	97	101	104	3	120	126	130	3	234
4	Magdalena Karolak (POL)	A	124.50	97	~~100~~	101	4	126	~~134~~	~~134~~	5	227
5	Aleksandra Mierzejewska (POL)	A	139.40	95	98	100	5	127	~~135~~	~~135~~	4	227
6	Hanna Makarova (UKR)	A	122.50	90	96	~~99~~	6	120	126	~~132~~	6	222
7	Melike Günal (TUR)	B	106.35	75	82	85	7	95	100	105	7	190
8	Tereza Kralova (CZE)	B	90.75	73	77	80	8	83	88	92	8	172
9	Ana Crnjac (CRO)	B	90.25	50	55	57	9	65	68	70	9	127
