= Hurşit Atak =

Turkish weightlifter (born 1991)

Personal information
- Nationality: Turkish
- Born: May 24, 1991 (age 35) Şırnak, Turkey
- Height: 1.62 m (5 ft 4 in)
- Weight: 62 kg (137 lb; 9.8 st)

Sport
- Country: Turkey
- Sport: Weightlifting
- Event: –62 kg
- Club: ASKİ Sports Club, Ankara
Medal record
European Championships
Gold medal – first place	2016 Førde	–62 kg
Gold medal – first place	2017 Split	–62 kg
Bronze medal – third place	2011 Kazan	–62 kg
World Junior Championships
Silver medal – second place	2010 Sofia	–62 kg

Hurşit Atak (born May 24, 1991) is a Turkish weightlifter competing in the −62 kg division. He is a native of Şırnak in southeastern Turkey. Currently, he is a member of the ASKİ Sports Club in Ankara.

== Career ==
Hırşit Atak was born to a village guard father in Şırnak on May 23, 1991. He has fourteen siblings, one of them being his twin brother.

Atak became champion already at the national high school tournament held 2005 in Konya. In 2006, he became national champion in his age category in Aydın.

At the 2010 World Junior Championship held in Sofia, Bulgaria, he won three silver medals in the 62 kg division. Atak won the silver medal in the Clean&Jerk category and the bronze medal lifting 289.0 kg in total at the 2011 European Championships in Kazan, Russia. At the 2012 Summer Olympics, he finished in 5th in the -62 kg division, with a total 302 kg. He won the gold medal in Clean&Jerk and in total at the 2016 European Championships held in Førde, Norway.

== Medals ==
European Championships

Rank	Discipline	Snatch	Clean&Jerk	Total	Place	Date
Gold	–62 kg		170.0		Norway, Førde	Apr 10–16, 2016
Gold	–62 kg			296.0	Norway, Førde	Apr 10–16, 2016
Silver	–62 kg		161.0		Russia, Kazan	Apr 11–17, 2011
Bronze	–62 kg			289.0	Russia, Kazan	Apr 11–17, 2011

World Junior Championships

Rank	Discipline	Snatch	Clean&Jerk	Total	Place	Date
Silver	–62 kg	126.0			Bulgaria, Sofia	June 11–20, 2010
Silver	–62 kg		160.0		Bulgaria, Sofia	June 11–20, 2010
Silver	–62 kg			286.0	Bulgaria, Sofia	June 11–20, 2010
