= Robert Joachim =

German weightlifter (1987–2020)

Personal information
- Full name: Robert Friedrich Joachim
- Nationality: German
- Born: 13 January 1987
- Died: 25 November 2020 (aged 33) Berlin, Germany
- Weight: 68.84 kg (152 lb)

Sport
- Country: Germany
- Sport: Weightlifting
- Weight class: 69 kg
- Team: National team
Medal record
European Championships
Silver medal – second place	2018 Bucharest	–69 kg
Bronze medal – third place	2017 Split	–69 kg

Robert Friedrich Joachim (13 January 1987 – 25 November 2020) was a German male weightlifter, competing in the 69 kg category and representing Germany at international competitions.

He competed at the World Weightlifting Championships in 2013, 2015, 2017, and 2018.

In the 69 kg class at the European Weightlifting Championships, Joachim competed in 2016, won all-around bronze in 2017 (with silver in clean and jerk) and all-around silver in 2018 (with bronze in clean and jerk).

== Major results ==
Year	Venue	Weight	Snatch (kg)				Clean & Jerk (kg)				Total	Rank
Year	Venue	Weight	1	2	3	Rank	1	2	3	Rank	Total	Rank
World Championships
2013	Wrocław, Poland	69 kg	132	135	137	10	165	170	~~173~~	9	307	10
2015	Houston, United States	69 kg	133	136	138	23	163	~~167~~	167	26	305	21
2017	Anaheim, United States	69 kg	135	139	141	8	170	~~175~~	~~175~~	8	311	7
2018	Ashgabat, Turkmenistan	73 kg	128	133	~~137~~	32	163	167	171	21	304	25
European Championships
2016	Førde, Norway	69 kg	~~132~~	~~132~~	132	14	157	162	165	7	297	9
2017	Split, Croatia	69 kg	134	138	141	4	167	172	176	2nd place, silver medalist(s)	317	3rd place, bronze medalist(s)
2018	Bucharest, Romania	69 kg	133	136	138	4	167	170	173	3rd place, bronze medalist(s)	311	2nd place, silver medalist(s)
