= Diana Mstieva =

Russian weightlifter (born 1994)

Personal information
- Nationality: Russia
- Born: 25 November 1994 (age 31)
- Weight: 86.64 kg (191.0 lb)

Sport
- Country: Russia
- Sport: Weightlifting
- Event: –87 kg
Medal record
European Championships
Gold medal – first place	2017 Split	–90 kg
Silver medal – second place	2019 Batumi	–87 kg

Diana Mstieva (Russian: Диана Мстиева; born 25 November 1994) is a Russian weightlifter and European Champion competing in the 90 kg category until 2018 and 87 kg starting in 2018 after the International Weightlifting Federation reorganized the categories.

== Career ==
In 2017, she won the silver medal in the women's 90 kg event at the Summer Universiade held in New Taipei, Taiwan.

She competed at the 2019 European Weightlifting Championships in the 87 kg category.

== Major results ==
Year	Venue	Weight	Snatch (kg)				Clean & Jerk (kg)				Total	Rank
Year	Venue	Weight	1	2	3	Rank	1	2	3	Rank	Total	Rank
European Championships
2017	Split, Croatia	90 kg	104	~~108~~	109	2nd place, silver medalist(s)	126	129	132	1st place, gold medalist(s)	241	1st place, gold medalist(s)
2019	(Georgia (country)) Batumi, Georgia	87 kg	104	~~108~~	110	2nd place, silver medalist(s)	130	~~135~~	~~137~~	2nd place, silver medalist(s)	240	2nd place, silver medalist(s)
