= Dumitru Captari =

Romanian weightlifter

Personal information
- Nationality: Romania, Moldova
- Born: 12 July 1989 (age 36) Chișinău, Moldavian SSR, Soviet Union
- Weight: 76.94 kg (169.6 lb)

Sport
- Country: Romania
- Sport: Weightlifting
- Team: National team
Medal record
European Championships
Gold medal – first place	2017 Split	–77 kg
Bronze medal – third place	2016 Førde	–77 kg
- Updated on 9 October 2017

Dumitru Captari (born 12 July 1989) is a Moldovan-born Romanian male weightlifter, competing in the 77 kg category. In 2015, he represented Moldova at the international competitions, and since 2015, he has been representing Romania. He participated at the 2016 Summer Olympics in the men's 77 kg event. He competed at world championships, including at the 2015 World Weightlifting Championships.

He also participated at the 2016 European Weightlifting Championships, where he won several medals. Thanks to these results Captari qualified for 2016 Summer Olympics. At the 2017 European Weightlifting Championships Captari won a silver medal at snatch and the gold medal in clean & jerk and overall ranking for 77 kg category.

== Major results ==
Year	Venue	Weight	Snatch (kg)				Clean & Jerk (kg)				Total	Rank
Year	Venue	Weight	1	2	3	Rank	1	2	3	Rank	Total	Rank
Representing Romania
Olympic Games
2016	Rio de Janeiro, Brazil	77 kg	145	~~150~~	~~150~~	14	—	—	—	—	—	—
World Championships
2017	Anaheim, United States	77 kg	147	153	156	3rd place, bronze medalist(s)	~~185~~	~~187~~	~~190~~	—	—	—
2015	Houston, United States	77 kg	~~148~~	148	~~153~~	26	184	~~189~~	189	12	337	15
European Championships
2017	Split, Croatia	77 kg	150	155	160	2nd place, silver medalist(s)	190	195	200	1st place, gold medalist(s)	360	1st place, gold medalist(s)
2016	Førde, Norway	77 kg	147	152	156	3rd place, bronze medalist(s)	185	~~192~~	192	3rd place, bronze medalist(s)	348	3rd place, bronze medalist(s)
Representing Moldova
World Championships
2013	Wrocław, Poland	77 kg	~~145~~	~~145~~	~~145~~	—	~~181~~	~~181~~	—	—	—	—
European Championships
2015	(Georgia (country)) Tbilisi, Georgia	77 kg	142	147	152	6	180	~~190~~	~~190~~	9	332	8
2014	Tel Aviv, Israel	77 kg	140	145	~~150~~	10	~~180~~	~~180~~	~~180~~	—	—	—
