= Natalia Khlestkina =

Russian weightlifter (born 1992)

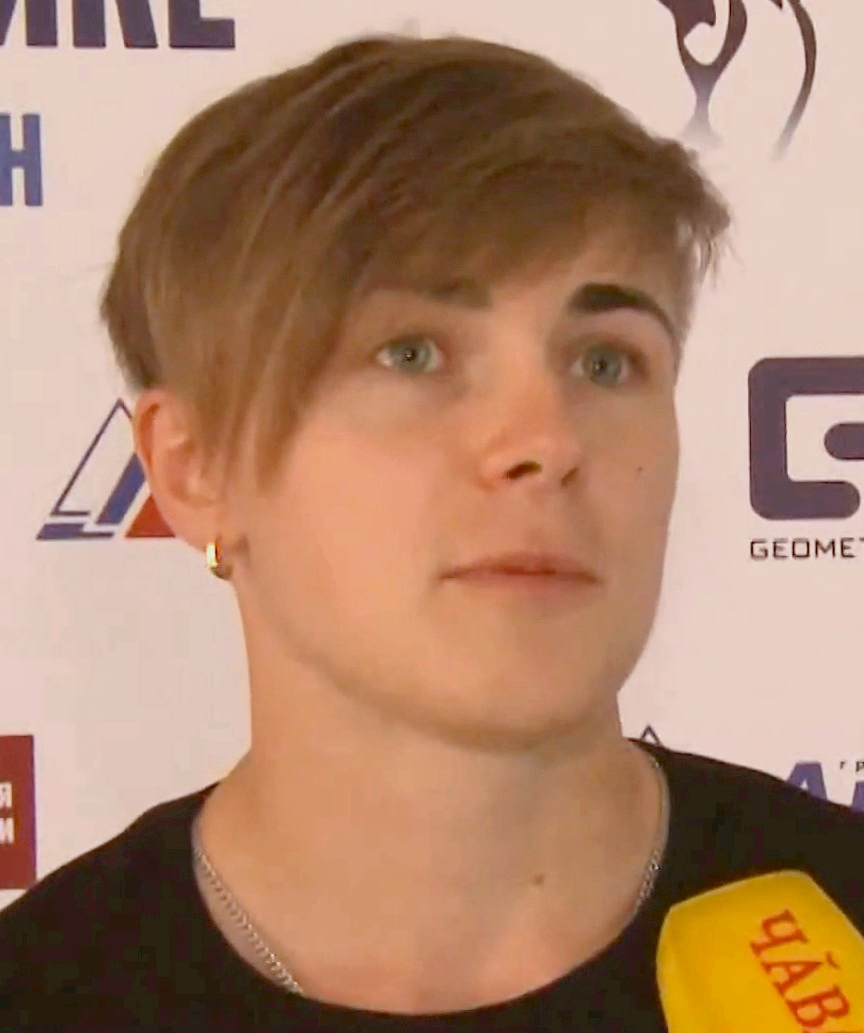
- Khlestkina in 2017

Personal information
- Born: 23 April 1992 (age 33)
- Weight: 60.75 kg (133.9 lb)

Sport
- Country: Russia
- Sport: Weightlifting
- Weight class: 63 kg
- Updated on 12 November 2016

Natalia Khlestkina (born 23 April 1992) is a Russian weightlifter who competed in the 63 kg category and represented Russia at international competitions. She won the gold medal at the 2016 European Weightlifting Championships.

In 2012, she was caught and sanctioned for using the forbidden substance metenolone. Her sanctions ended in 2014.

At the 2017 European Weightlifting Championships, Khlestkina won a silver medal (snatch) and the gold medal in clean & jerk and overall ranking in women's 58 kg category.

== Major results ==
| Year | Venue | Weight | Snatch (kg) | | | | Clean & Jerk (kg) | | | | Total | Rank |
| Year | Venue | Weight | 1 | 2 | 3 | Rank | 1 | 2 | 3 | Rank | Total | Rank |
European Weightlifting Championships
| 2016 | Førde, Norway | 63 kg | ~~99~~ | ~~99~~ | 99 | 2nd place, silver medalist(s) | 115 | 120 | 123 | 1st place, gold medalist(s) | 222 | 1st place, gold medalist(s) |
| 2017 | Split, Croatia| | 58 kg | 92 | ~~95~~ | 95 | Bronze medal icon | 114 | 117 | 119 | 1st place, gold medalist(s) | 214 | 1st place, gold medalist(s) |
