= Oleksandr Pielieshenko =

Ukrainian weightlifter (1994–2024)

Personal information
- Native name: Олександр Юрійович Пелешенко
- Full name: Oleksandr Yuriyovych Pielieshenko
- Born: 7 January 1994 Stanytsia Luhanska, Luhansk Oblast, Ukraine
- Died: 5 May 2024 (aged 30)
- Height: 1.70 m (5 ft 7 in)
- Weight: 85 kg (187 lb)
- Military career
- Allegiance: Ukraine
- Branch: Ukrainian Ground Forces
- Service years: 2022–2024
- Conflicts: Russo-Ukrainian War; Russian invasion of Ukraine †

Sport
- Sport: Weightlifting
- Club: МСУ

Achievements and titles
- Personal bests: Snatch: 175 kg (2016); Clean and jerk: 211 kg (2017); Total: 386 kg (2017)
Medal record
Men's weightlifting
Representing Ukraine
European Championships
Gold medal – first place	2016 Førde	−85 kg
Gold medal – first place	2017 Split	−85 kg

Oleksandr Yuriyovych Pielieshenko (Ukrainian: Олександр Юрійович Пелешенко, also transliterated Peleshenko; 7 January 1994 – 5 May 2024) was a Ukrainian weightlifter. He was the 2016 and 2017 European Champion. He also competed for Ukraine at the 2016 Summer Olympics. Pielieshenko was killed in action during the Russo-Ukrainian War, at the age of 30.

== Career ==
As of April 2018, he was suspended due to an out-of-competition drug test that detected the masking agent chlorthalidone. He was suspended provisionally until 2026.

== Later life and death ==
In the first days of the 2022 Russian invasion of Ukraine, Pielieshenko joined the Armed Forces of Ukraine. He died during combat operations on 5 May 2024, at the age of 30. He was the first Olympian to be killed in action during the Russo-Ukrainian War.

== Major results ==
Year	Venue	Weight	Snatch (kg)				Clean & Jerk (kg)				Total	Rank	Ref
Year	Venue	Weight	1	2	3	Rank	1	2	3	Rank	Total	Rank	Ref
Olympic Games
2016	Rio de Janeiro, Brazil	85 kg	170	173	175	4	~~210~~	210	~~212~~	4	385	4	
World Championships
2015	Houston, United States	85 kg	167	~~173~~	~~173~~	7	~~201~~	201	~~210~~	7	368	4	
European Championships
2016	Førde, Norway	85 kg	~~165~~	165	168	2nd place, silver medalist(s)	200	~~204~~	204	1st place, gold medalist(s)	372	1st place, gold medalist(s)	
2017	Split, Croatia	85 kg	~~170~~	170	175	1st place, gold medalist(s)	202	~~211~~	211	2nd place, silver medalist(s)	386	1st place, gold medalist(s)	

== See also ==
- List of Ukrainian sports figures killed during the Russo-Ukrainian war
