= Anastasiia Lysenko =

Ukrainian weightlifter (born 1995)

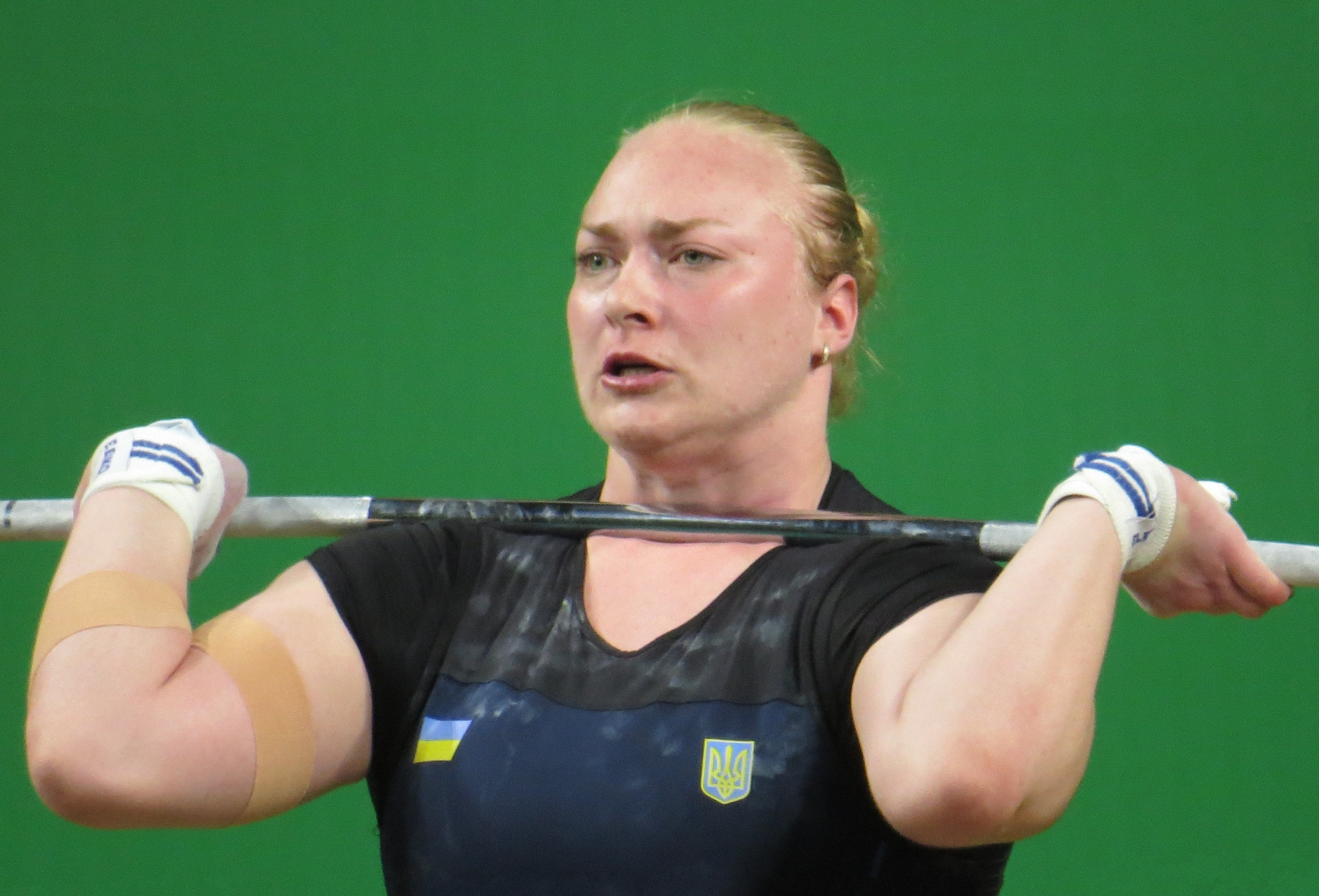
- Lysenko at the 2016 Olympics

Personal information
- Born: 2 December 1995 (age 30) Vuhledar, Donetsk Oblast, Ukraine
- Height: 1.76 m (5 ft 9 in)
- Weight: 101 kg (223 lb)

Sport
- Country: Ukraine
- Sport: Weightlifting
- Event: Women's +75 kg
- Club: Kolos; Dynamo
- Coached by: Yury Kuchinov
Medal record
Women's weightlifting
Representing Ukraine
European Championships
Silver medal – second place	2015 Tbilisi	+75 kg
Silver medal – second place	2017 Split	+90 kg
Silver medal – second place	2019 Batumi	+87 kg
Silver medal – second place	2021 Moscow	+87 kg

Anastasiia Serhiivna Lysenko (Ukrainian: Анастасія Сергіївна Лисенко; born 2 December 1995) is a Ukrainian weightlifter who competes in the +75 kg weight division. She won a silver medal at the 2015 European Championships and placed tenth at the 2016 Olympics. She took up weightlifting aged eight in Vuhledar.

In 2020, she won the silver medal in the women's +87 kg event at the Roma 2020 World Cup in Rome, Italy.
