= Ilie Ciotoiu =

Romanian weightlifter (born 1995)

Personal information
- Full name: Ilie-Constantin Ciotoiu
- Born: 11 July 1995 (age 30)
- Weight: 55.87 kg (123.2 lb)

Sport
- Country: Romania
- Sport: Weightlifting
- Team: National team
Medal record
European Championships
| Silver medal – second place | 2017 Split | –56 kg |
| Bronze medal – third place | 2018 Bucharest | –56 kg |
- Updated on 31 August 2016

Ilie-Constantin Ciotoiu (born 11 July 1995) is a Romanian male weightlifter, competing in the 56 kg category and representing Romania at international competitions. He competed at world championships, including at the 2015 World Weightlifting Championships. At the 2017 European Weightlifting Championships Ciotoiu won 2 bronze medals, at Clean & Jerk and overall ranking.

== Major results ==
| Year | Venue | Weight | Snatch (kg) | | | | Clean & Jerk (kg) | | | | Total | Rank |
| Year | Venue | Weight | 1 | 2 | 3 | Rank | 1 | 2 | 3 | Rank | Total | Rank |
World Championships
| 2015 | Houston, United States | 56 kg | ~~104~~ | ~~104~~ | ~~104~~ | --- | 133 | ~~136~~ | ~~136~~ | 22 | 0 | --- |
European Championships
| 2017 | Split, Croatia | 56 kg | 108 | 111 | ~~115~~ | 3rd place, bronze medalist(s) | ~~131~~ | 131 | ~~140~~ | 2nd place, silver medalist(s) | 242 | 2nd place, silver medalist(s) |
