= Monica Csengeri =

Romanian weightlifter (born 1996)

Monica-Suneta Csengeri
Personal information
- Born: 21 March 1996 (age 30)
- Weight: 47.88 kg (105.6 lb)

Sport
- Country: Romania
- Sport: Weightlifting
- Team: National team
Medal record
European Championships
Gold medal – first place	2021 Moscow	49 kg
Silver medal – second place	2017 Split	–48 kg
- Updated on 20 July 2016

Monica-Suneta Csengeri (born 21 March 1996) is a Romanian weightlifter, competing in the 48 kg category and representing Romania at international competitions. Competed at world championships, most recently at the 2015 World Weightlifting Championships. In 2018 she tested positive for Ephedrine and was banned until 2019 by the International Weightlifting Federation.

== Major results ==
Year	Venue	Weight	Snatch (kg)				Clean & Jerk (kg)				Total	Rank
Year	Venue	Weight	1	2	3	Rank	1	2	3	Rank	Total	Rank
World Championships
2015	Houston, United States	-48 kg	75	78	80	13	93	~~97~~	~~98~~	28	173	19
