= Sarah Øvsthus =

Norwegian weightlifter and athletics competitor

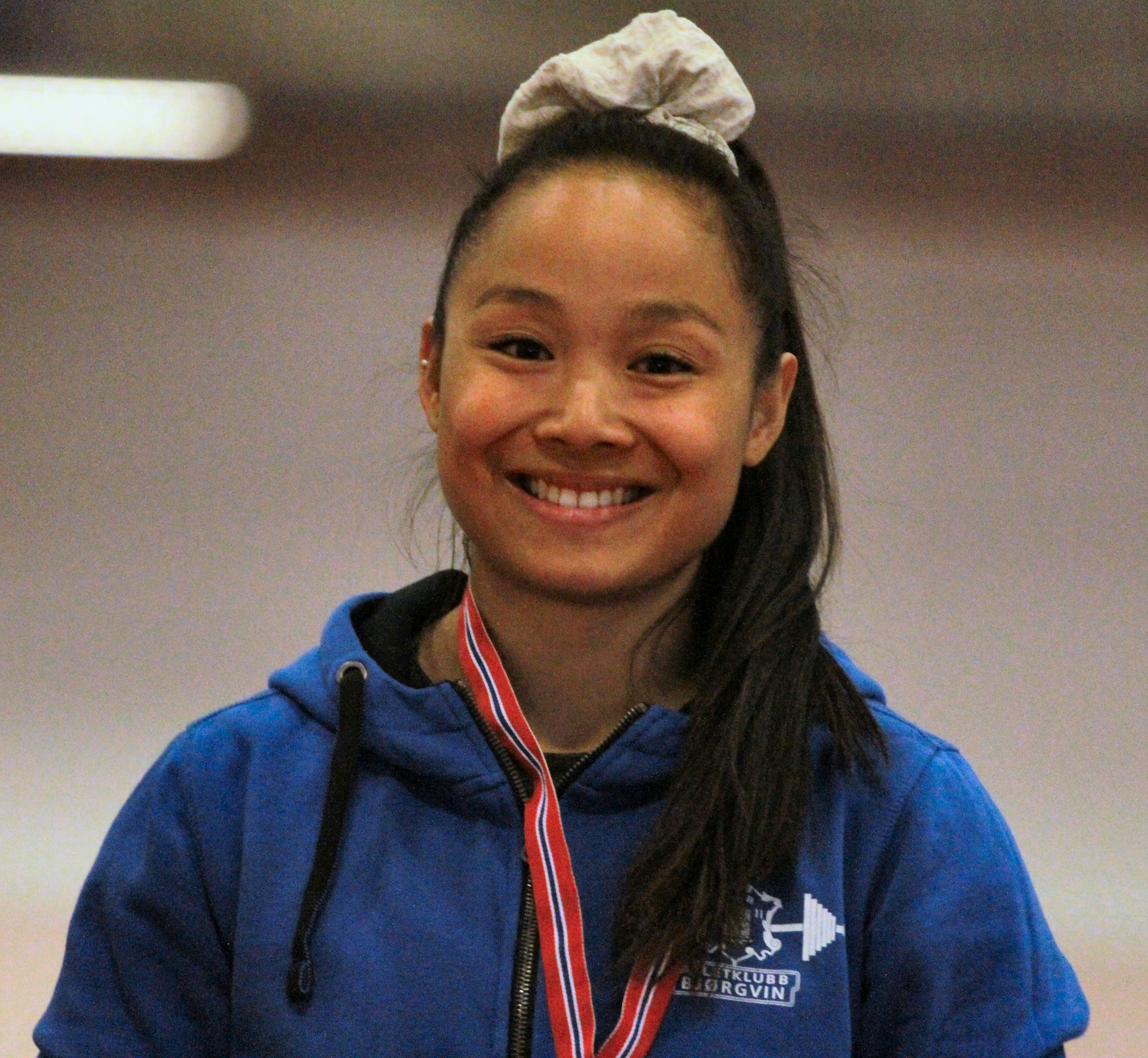
- Sarah Øvsthus

Personal information
- Full name: Sarah Orteza Hovden Øvsthus
- Born: 20 March 1994 (age 32)
- Weight: 51.60 kg (113.8 lb)

Sport
- Country: Norway
- Sport: Weightlifting
- Weight class: 53 kg
- Updated on 12 November 2016

Sarah Orteza Hovden Øvsthus (born 20 March 1994) is a Norwegian weightlifter, who competed in the 53 kg category and represented Norway at international competitions. She competed at the 2015 European Weightlifting Championships and 2016 European Weightlifting Championships.

As an athlete she became Norwegian champion in the standing long jump in 2015. She represents the club Laksevåg TIL.

== Major results ==
Year	Venue	Weight	Snatch (kg)				Clean & Jerk (kg)				Total	Rank
Year	Venue	Weight	1	2	3	Rank	1	2	3	Rank	Total	Rank
European Weightlifting Championships
2015	Georgia	53 kg	67	~~70~~	~~70~~	9	83	85	~~87~~	9	152	9
2016	Førde, Norway	53 kg	71	74	~~75~~	15	87	~~90~~	90	12	164	13
