= Anaïs Michel =

French weightlifter (born 1988)

Personal information
- Born: 12 January 1988 (age 38)
- Weight: 47.32 kg (104 lb)

Sport
- Country: France
- Sport: Weightlifting
- Team: National team
Medal record
European Championships
Gold medal – first place	2017 Split	–48 kg
Silver medal – second place	2018 Bucharest	–48 kg
- Updated on 23 June 2016

Anaïs Michel (born 12 January 1988) is a French weightlifter, competing in the 48 kg category and representing France at international competitions. She competed at world championships, most recently at the 2015 World Weightlifting Championships. She also competed at the 2017 European Weightlifting Championships.

She represented France at the 2020 Summer Olympics in Tokyo, Japan. She finished in 7th place in the women's 49 kg event.

== Major results ==
Year	Venue	Weight	Snatch (kg)				Clean & Jerk (kg)				Total	Rank
Year	Venue	Weight	1	2	3	Rank	1	2	3	Rank	Total	Rank
World Championships
2015	Houston, United States	-48 kg	78	~~80~~	~~80~~	16	97	99	~~101~~	15	177	15
2017	Anaheim, United States	-48 kg	~~78~~	78	~~80~~	7	97	~~100~~	~~100~~	8	175	8
