= Dmytro Hnidenko =

Ukrainian weightlifter

Personal information
- Born: 13 October 1975 (age 50) Ukrainian SSR, Soviet Union
- Height: 170 cm (5 ft 7 in)
- Weight: 77 kg (170 lb)

Sport
- Sport: Weightlifting

Dmytro Hnidenko (Ukrainian: Дмитро Гніденко, born 13 October 1975) is a retired Ukrainian middleweight weightlifter. He placed eighth at the 1999 World Championships and 2000 Olympics.
