= 2011 European Junior & U23 Weightlifting Championships =

International youth weightlifting competition

- Location: Bucharest, Romania

The 2011 European Junior & U23 Weightlifting Championships were held in Bucharest, Romania.

== Medal overview (juniors) ==
=== Men ===
Event		Gold		Silver		Bronze	
– 56 kg	Snatch	Florin Croitoru (ROU)	121 kg	Stanislau Chadovich (BLR)	117 kg	Josué Brachi (ESP)	109 kg
– 56 kg	Clean & Jerk	Florin Croitoru (ROU)	149 kg	Stanislau Chadovich (BLR)	137 kg	Stefan Matsarov (BUL)	135 kg
– 56 kg	Total	Florin Croitoru (ROU)	270 kg	Stanislau Chadovich (BLR)	254 kg	Stefan Matsarov (BUL)	243 kg
– 62 kg	Snatch	Iurie Dudoglo (MDA)	124 kg	Rais Gainutdinov (RUS)	123 kg	Muhammet Koçum (TUR)	122 kg
– 62 kg	Clean & Jerk	Rais Gainutdinov (RUS)	154 kg	Iurie Dudoglo (MDA)	153 kg	Muhammet Koçum (TUR)	148 kg
– 62 kg	Total	Rais Gainutdinov (RUS)	277 kg	Iurie Dudoglo (MDA)	277 kg	Muhammet Koçum (TUR)	270 kg
– 69 kg	Snatch	Daniel Godelli (ALB)	141 kg	Artiom Pipa (MDA)	140 kg	Giorgi Lomtadze (GEO)	140 kg
– 69 kg	Clean & Jerk	Firidun Guliyev (AZE)	173 kg	Yunder Beytula (BUL)	170 kg	Artiom Pipa (MDA)	168 kg
– 69 kg	Total	Artiom Pipa (MDA)	308 kg	Giorgi Lomtadze (GEO)	307 kg	Firidun Guliyev (AZE)	303 kg
– 77 kg	Snatch	Albert Sayakhov (RUS)	151 kg	Hysen Pulaku (ALB)	150 kg	Răzvan Martin (ROU)	148 kg
– 77 kg	Clean & Jerk	Albert Sayakhov (RUS)	187 kg	Andrés Mata (ESP)	185 kg	Antonis Martasidis (GRE)	182 kg
– 77 kg	Total	Albert Sayakhov (RUS)	338 kg	Hysen Pulaku (ALB)	330 kg	Andrés Mata (ESP)	330 kg
– 85 kg	Snatch	Artem Okulov (RUS)	158 kg	Aliaksandr Bersanau (BLR)	153 kg	Krystian Sroka (POL)	151 kg
– 85 kg	Clean & Jerk	Artem Okulov (RUS)	195 kg	Victor Kharchenko (RUS)	194 kg	Aliaksandr Bersanau (BLR)	191 kg
– 85 kg	Total	Artem Okulov (RUS)	353 kg	Victor Kharchenko (RUS)	345 kg	Aliaksandr Bersanau (BLR)	344 kg
– 94 kg	Snatch	Alexei Kosov (RUS)	173 kg	Leonard Cobzariu (ROU)	162 kg	Žygimantas Stanulis (LTU)	161 kg
– 94 kg	Clean & Jerk	Aliaksandr Venskel (BLR)	198 kg	Kostiantyn Reva (UKR)	196 kg	Leonard Cobzariu (ROU)	195 kg
– 94 kg	Total	Alexei Kosov (RUS)	364 kg	Leonard Cobzariu (ROU)	357 kg	Aliaksandr Venskel (BLR)	355 kg
– 105 kg	Snatch	Artūrs Plēsnieks (LAT)	165 kg	Paweł Jurecki (POL)	163 kg	Oleksandr Tkachenko (UKR)	157 kg
– 105 kg	Clean & Jerk	Artūrs Plēsnieks (LAT)	207 kg	Oleksandr Tkachenko (UKR)	201 kg	Vasyl Pylypenko (UKR)	186 kg
– 105 kg	Total	Artūrs Plēsnieks (LAT)	372 kg	Oleksandr Tkachenko (UKR)	358 kg	Paweł Jurecki (POL)	348 kg
+ 105 kg	Snatch	Lasha Talakhadze (GEO)	185 kg	Gor Minasyan (ARM)	179 kg	Magomed Abuev (RUS)	178 kg
+ 105 kg	Clean & Jerk	Lasha Talakhadze (GEO)	217 kg	Gor Minasyan (ARM)	216 kg	Magomed Abuev (RUS)	212 kg
+ 105 kg	Total	Lasha Talakhadze (GEO)	402 kg	Gor Minasyan (ARM)	395 kg	Magomed Abuev (RUS)	390 kg

=== Women ===
Event		Gold		Silver		Bronze	
– 48 kg	Snatch	Elena Andrieș (ROU)	79 kg	Şaziye Okur (TUR)	78 kg	Mélanie Bonnamant (FRA)	65 kg
– 48 kg	Clean & Jerk	Elena Andrieș (ROU)	96 kg	Şaziye Okur (TUR)	95 kg	Katarzyna Feledyn (POL)	85 kg
– 48 kg	Total	Elena Andrieș (ROU)	175 kg	Şaziye Okur (TUR)	173 kg	Katarzyna Feledyn (POL)	150 kg
– 53 kg	Snatch	Cristina Iovu (MDA)	90 kg	Kseniia Maksimova (RUS)	83 kg	Mariia Lubina (RUS)	80 kg
– 53 kg	Clean & Jerk	Cristina Iovu (MDA)	105 kg	Ayşegül Çoban (TUR)	104 kg	Mariia Lubina (RUS)	101 kg
– 53 kg	Total	Cristina Iovu (MDA)	195 kg	Mariia Lubina (RUS)	181 kg	Kseniia Maksimova (RUS)	181 kg
– 58 kg	Snatch	Tatiana Aleeva (RUS)	91 kg	Liudmila Bryl (BLR)	90 kg	Mădălina Molie (ROU)	87 kg
– 58 kg	Clean & Jerk	Natallia Kolas (BLR)	111 kg	Tatiana Aleeva (RUS)	111 kg	Liudmila Bryl (BLR)	106 kg
– 58 kg	Total	Tatiana Aleeva (RUS)	202 kg	Natallia Kolas (BLR)	196 kg	Liudmila Bryl (BLR)	196 kg
– 63 kg	Snatch	Irina Lepșa (ROU)	95 kg	Darya Pachabut (BLR)	94 kg	Neslihan Okumuş (TUR)	90 kg
– 63 kg	Clean & Jerk	Marina Kaneva (RUS)	116 kg	Irina Lepșa (ROU)	116 kg	Neslihan Okumuş (TUR)	110 kg
– 63 kg	Total	Irina Lepșa (ROU)	211 kg	Darya Pachabut (BLR)	203 kg	Marina Kaneva (RUS)	201 kg
– 69 kg	Snatch	Svetlana Lobanova (RUS)	92 kg	Figen Kaya (TUR)	91 kg	Patrycja Piechowiak (POL)	88 kg
– 69 kg	Clean & Jerk	Figen Kaya (TUR)	113 kg	Svetlana Lobanova (RUS)	112 kg	Hatice Demirel (TUR)	109 kg
– 69 kg	Total	Figen Kaya (TUR)	204 kg	Svetlana Lobanova (RUS)	204 kg	Patrycja Piechowiak (POL)	197 kg
– 75 kg	Snatch	Olga Zubova (RUS)	103 kg	Hanna Kozenko (UKR)	100 kg	Nina Schroth (GER)	99 kg
– 75 kg	Clean & Jerk	Olga Zubova (RUS)	135 kg	Hanna Kozenko (UKR)	121 kg	Oxana Karpunenko (RUS)	121 kg
– 75 kg	Total	Olga Zubova (RUS)	238 kg	Hanna Kozenko (UKR)	221 kg	Oxana Karpunenko (RUS)	216 kg
+ 75 kg	Snatch	Andreea Aanei (ROU)	103 kg	Marina Stoyanova (BUL)	90 kg	Carlotta Brunelli (ITA)	82 kg
+ 75 kg	Clean & Jerk	Marina Stoyanova (BUL)	118 kg	Andreea Aanei (ROU)	112 kg	Carlotta Brunelli (ITA)	94 kg
+ 75 kg	Total	Andreea Aanei (ROU)	215 kg	Marina Stoyanova (BUL)	208 kg	Carlotta Brunelli (ITA)	176 kg

=== Medals table ===
* Host nation (Romania)

Rank	Nation	Gold	Silver	Bronze	Total
1	Russia (RUS)	17	8	9	34
2	Romania (ROU)*	10	4	3	17
3	Moldova (MDA)	5	3	1	9
4	Georgia (GEO)	3	1	1	5
5	Latvia (LAT)	3	0	0	3
6	Belarus (BLR)	2	8	5	15
7	Turkey (TUR)	2	5	6	13
8	Bulgaria (BUL)	1	3	2	6
9	Albania (ALB)	1	2	0	3
10	Azerbaijan (AZE)	1	0	1	2
11	Ukraine (UKR)	0	6	2	8
12	Armenia (ARM)	0	3	0	3
13	Poland (POL)	0	1	6	7
14	Spain (ESP)	0	1	2	3
15	Italy (ITA)	0	0	3	3
16	France (FRA)	0	0	1	1
16	Germany (GER)	0	0	1	1
16	Greece (GRE)	0	0	1	1
16	Lithuania (LTU)	0	0	1	1
Totals (19 entries)		45	45	45	135

== Medal overview (U23) ==
=== Men ===
Event		Gold		Silver		Bronze	
– 56 kg	Snatch	Ferdi Nazif (BUL)	107 kg	Gabriel Olaru (ROU)	106 kg	Zeki Tuncer (TUR)	80 kg
– 56 kg	Clean & Jerk	Gabriel Olaru (ROU)	133 kg	Ferdi Nazif (BUL)	131 kg	Zeki Tuncer (TUR)	102 kg
– 56 kg	Total	Gabriel Olaru (ROU)	239 kg	Ferdi Nazif (BUL)	238 kg	Zeki Tuncer (TUR)	182 kg
– 62 kg	Snatch	Pavel Sukhanov (RUS)	126 kg	Rubik Mamoyan (ARM)	123 kg	Acorán Hernández (ESP)	121 kg
– 62 kg	Clean & Jerk	Pavel Sukhanov (RUS)	163 kg	Marius Gîscan (ROU)	153 kg	Stoyan Enev (BUL)	152 kg
– 62 kg	Total	Pavel Sukhanov (RUS)	289 kg	Stoyan Enev (BUL)	272 kg	Feliks Khalibekov (RUS)	271 kg
– 69 kg	Snatch	Oleg Chen (RUS)	157 kg	Sergey Petrosyan (RUS)	145 kg	Briken Calja (ALB)	141 kg
– 69 kg	Clean & Jerk	Oleg Chen (RUS)	180 kg	Sergey Petrosyan (RUS)	173 kg	Briken Calja (ALB)	170 kg
– 69 kg	Total	Oleg Chen (RUS)	337 kg	Sergey Petrosyan (RUS)	318 kg	Briken Calja (ALB)	311 kg
– 77 kg	Snatch	Alexandr Safaryan (RUS)	152 kg	Adrian Ghişoiu (ROU)	150 kg	Aghasi Aghasyan (ARM)	148 kg
– 77 kg	Clean & Jerk	Aghasi Aghasyan (ARM)	180 kg	Ensar Musić (CRO)	180 kg	Andrei Bîrcă (MDA)	178 kg
– 77 kg	Total	Aghasi Aghasyan (ARM)	328 kg	Alexandr Safaryan (RUS)	327 kg	Adrian Ghişoiu (ROU)	326 kg
– 85 kg	Snatch	Gheorghe Cernei (MDA)	155 kg	Dumitru Captari (MDA)	145 kg	Sergii Kruglenko (UKR)	145 kg
– 85 kg	Clean & Jerk	Gheorghe Cernei (MDA)	188 kg	Roman Kliś (POL)	187 kg	Sergii Kruglenko (UKR)	187 kg
– 85 kg	Total	Gheorghe Cernei (MDA)	343 kg	Sergii Kruglenko (UKR)	332 kg	Dumitru Captari (MDA)	331 kg
– 94 kg	Snatch	Aliaksandr Makaranka (BLR)	170 kg	Marius Danciu (ROU)	167 kg	Martin Sabanchiev (RUS)	165 kg
– 94 kg	Clean & Jerk	Aliaksandr Makaranka (BLR)	202 kg	Martin Sabanchiev (RUS)	201 kg	Marius Danciu (ROU)	199 kg
– 94 kg	Total	Aliaksandr Makaranka (BLR)	372 kg	Martin Sabanchiev (RUS)	366 kg	Marius Danciu (ROU)	366 kg
– 105 kg	Snatch	Davit Gogia (GEO)	172 kg	Yury Tegkaev (RUS)	172 kg	Arkadiusz Michalski (POL)	160 kg
– 105 kg	Clean & Jerk	Arkadiusz Michalski (POL)	209 kg	Yury Tegkaev (RUS)	208 kg	Davit Gogia (GEO)	207 kg
– 105 kg	Total	Yury Tegkaev (RUS)	389 kg	Davit Gogia (GEO)	379 kg	Arkadiusz Michalski (POL)	369 kg
+ 105 kg	Snatch	Hayk Hakobyan (ARM)	181 kg	Dzmitry Vornik (BLR)	180 kg	Alexej Prochorow (GER)	180 kg
+ 105 kg	Clean & Jerk	Jiří Orság (CZE)	229 kg	Evgeny Pisarev (RUS)	225 kg	Oleh Slobodianiuk (UKR)	218 kg
+ 105 kg	Total	Jiří Orság (CZE)	405 kg	Evgeny Pisarev (RUS)	405 kg	Hayk Hakobyan (ARM)	398 kg

=== Women ===
Event		Gold		Silver		Bronze	
– 48 kg	Snatch	Genny Pagliaro (ITA)	85 kg	Agata Fus (POL)	60 kg	Veronika Věžníková (CZE)	49 kg
– 48 kg	Clean & Jerk	Genny Pagliaro (ITA)	98 kg	Agata Fus (POL)	81 kg	Veronika Věžníková (CZE)	62 kg
– 48 kg	Total	Genny Pagliaro (ITA)	183 kg	Agata Fus (POL)	141 kg	Veronika Věžníková (CZE)	111 kg
– 53 kg	Snatch	Marzena Karpińska (POL)	84 kg	Dana Berchi (ROU)	81 kg	Iana Diachenko (UKR)	80 kg
– 53 kg	Clean & Jerk	Marzena Karpińska (POL)	100 kg	Elena Sukhar (RUS)	98 kg	Dana Berchi (ROU)	98 kg
– 53 kg	Total	Marzena Karpińska (POL)	184 kg	Dana Berchi (ROU)	179 kg	Elena Sukhar (RUS)	177 kg
– 58 kg	Snatch	Olga Sibetova (RUS)	90 kg	Joanna Łochowska (POL)	87 kg	Iryna Mishchuk (BLR)	82 kg
– 58 kg	Clean & Jerk	Olga Sibetova (RUS)	110 kg	Joanna Łochowska (POL)	108 kg	Elif Şeker (TUR)	102 kg
– 58 kg	Total	Olga Sibetova (RUS)	200 kg	Joanna Łochowska (POL)	195 kg	Elif Şeker (TUR)	181 kg
– 63 kg	Snatch	Viktoria Puzyreva (RUS)	95 kg	Olga Afanasyeva (RUS)	95 kg	Liubov Berestova (UKR)	85 kg
– 63 kg	Clean & Jerk	Viktoria Puzyreva (RUS)	120 kg	Olga Afanasyeva (RUS)	114 kg	Liubov Berestova (UKR)	105 kg
– 63 kg	Total	Viktoria Puzyreva (RUS)	215 kg	Olga Afanasyeva (RUS)	209 kg	Liubov Berestova (UKR)	190 kg
– 69 kg	Snatch	Viktoriia Savenko (RUS)	119 kg	Roxana Cocoș (ROU)	105 kg	Maryna Shkermankova (BLR)	103 kg
– 69 kg	Clean & Jerk	Roxana Cocoș (ROU)	135 kg	Viktoriia Savenko (RUS)	131 kg	Maryna Shkermankova (BLR)	128 kg
– 69 kg	Total	Viktoriia Savenko (RUS)	250 kg	Roxana Cocoș (ROU)	240 kg	Maryna Shkermankova (BLR)	231 kg
– 75 kg	Snatch	Hatice Yılmaz (TUR)	98 kg	Katarzyna Lisewska (POL)	89 kg	Mariana Dumitraşcu (ROU)	73 kg
– 75 kg	Clean & Jerk	Hatice Yılmaz (TUR)	122 kg	Katarzyna Lisewska (POL)	105 kg	Eleonóra Gogorová (SVK)	98 kg
– 75 kg	Total	Hatice Yılmaz (TUR)	220 kg	Katarzyna Lisewska (POL)	194 kg	Eleonóra Gogorová (SVK)	168 kg
+ 75 kg	Snatch	Yulia Konovalova (RUS)	130 kg	Yulia Kachaeva (RUS)	110 kg	Tetiana Varlamova (UKR)	108 kg
+ 75 kg	Clean & Jerk	Yulia Konovalova (RUS)	160 kg	Yulia Kachaeva (RUS)	140 kg	Tetiana Varlamova (UKR)	132 kg
+ 75 kg	Total	Yulia Konovalova (RUS)	290 kg	Yulia Kachaeva (RUS)	250 kg	Tetiana Varlamova (UKR)	240 kg

=== Medals table ===
* Host nation (Romania)

Rank	Nation	Gold	Silver	Bronze	Total
1	Russia (RUS)	19	18	3	40
2	Poland (POL)	4	10	2	16
3	Romania (ROU)*	3	8	5	16
4	Belarus (BLR)	3	1	4	8
5	Armenia (ARM)	3	1	2	6
5	Moldova (MDA)	3	1	2	6
7	Turkey (TUR)	3	0	5	8
8	Italy (ITA)	3	0	0	3
9	Czech Republic (CZE)	2	0	3	5
10	Bulgaria (BUL)	1	3	1	5
11	Georgia (GEO)	1	1	1	3
12	Ukraine (UKR)	0	1	10	11
13	Croatia (CRO)	0	1	0	1
14	Albania (ALB)	0	0	3	3
15	Slovakia (SVK)	0	0	2	2
16	Germany (GER)	0	0	1	1
16	Spain (ESP)	0	0	1	1
Totals (17 entries)		45	45	45	135

== Overall medals table ==
* Host nation (Romania)

Rank	Nation	Gold	Silver	Bronze	Total
1	Russia (RUS)	36	26	12	74
2	Romania (ROU)*	13	12	8	33
3	Moldova (MDA)	8	4	3	15
4	Belarus (BLR)	5	9	9	23
5	Turkey (TUR)	5	5	11	21
6	Poland (POL)	4	11	8	23
7	Georgia (GEO)	4	2	2	8
8	Armenia (ARM)	3	4	2	9
9	Italy (ITA)	3	0	3	6
10	Latvia (LAT)	3	0	0	3
11	Bulgaria (BUL)	2	6	3	11
12	Czech Republic (CZE)	2	0	3	5
13	Albania (ALB)	1	2	3	6
14	Azerbaijan (AZE)	1	0	1	2
15	Ukraine (UKR)	0	7	12	19
16	Spain (ESP)	0	1	3	4
17	Croatia (CRO)	0	1	0	1
18	Germany (GER)	0	0	2	2
18	Slovakia (SVK)	0	0	2	2
20	France (FRA)	0	0	1	1
20	Greece (GRE)	0	0	1	1
20	Lithuania (LTU)	0	0	1	1
Totals (22 entries)		90	90	90	270
