= 2012 European Junior & U23 Weightlifting Championships =

International youth weightlifting competition

- Location: Eilat, Israel
- Dates: 29 November – 9 December

The 2012 European Junior & U23 Weightlifting Championships were held in Eilat, Israel from 29 November to 9 December 2012.

== Medal overview (juniors) ==
=== Men ===
Event		Gold		Silver		Bronze	
– 56 kg	Snatch	Josué Brachi (ESP)	113 kg	Todor Chenkov (BUL)	113 kg	Sinan Tetik (TUR)	99 kg
– 56 kg	Clean & Jerk	Josué Brachi (ESP)	136 kg	Todor Chenkov (BUL)	136 kg	Marian Albu (ROU)	123 kg
– 56 kg	Total	Josué Brachi (ESP)	249 kg	Todor Chenkov (BUL)	249 kg	Sinan Tetik (TUR)	221 kg
– 62 kg	Snatch	Florin Croitoru (ROU)	132 kg	Stanislau Chadovich (BLR)	127 kg	Shota Mishvelidze (GEO)	126 kg
– 62 kg	Clean & Jerk	Florin Croitoru (ROU)	157 kg	Shota Mishvelidze (GEO)	155 kg	Ion Ţerna (MDA)	155 kg
– 62 kg	Total	Florin Croitoru (ROU)	289 kg	Shota Mishvelidze (GEO)	281 kg	Ion Ţerna (MDA)	276 kg
– 69 kg	Snatch	Giorgi Lomtadze (GEO)	143 kg	Artiom Pipa (MDA)	142 kg	Süleyman Rüzgar (TUR)	139 kg
– 69 kg	Clean & Jerk	Firidun Guliyev (AZE)	180 kg	Artiom Pipa (MDA)	172 kg	Yunder Beytula (BUL)	171 kg
– 69 kg	Total	Firidun Guliyev (AZE)	316 kg	Artiom Pipa (MDA)	314 kg	Giorgi Lomtadze (GEO)	310 kg
– 77 kg	Snatch	Mukhamad Khibalov (RUS)	152 kg	Petr Asayonak (BLR)	152 kg	Ivan Klim (BLR)	151 kg
– 77 kg	Clean & Jerk	Antonis Martasidis (GRE)	190 kg	Andrés Mata (ESP)	190 kg	Razmik Unanyan (RUS)	185 kg
– 77 kg	Total	Antonis Martasidis (GRE)	336 kg	Razmik Unanyan (RUS)	335 kg	Andrés Mata (ESP)	335 kg
– 85 kg	Snatch	Aleh Khuhayeu (BLR)	163 kg	Dzmitry Zhuk (BLR)	158 kg	Oleksandr Pielieshenko (UKR)	156 kg
– 85 kg	Clean & Jerk	Aleh Khuhayeu (BLR)	197 kg	Victor Getts (RUS)	192 kg	Dzmitry Zhuk (BLR)	192 kg
– 85 kg	Total	Aleh Khuhayeu (BLR)	360 kg	Dzmitry Zhuk (BLR)	350 kg	Victor Getts (RUS)	346 kg
– 94 kg	Snatch	Aleksei Kosov (RUS)	172 kg	Aliaksandr Bersanau (BLR)	169 kg	Žygimantas Stanulis (LTU)	168 kg
– 94 kg	Clean & Jerk	Žygimantas Stanulis (LTU)	208 kg	Aliaksandr Venskel (BLR)	202 kg	Nailkhan Nabiyev (AZE)	200 kg
– 94 kg	Total	Žygimantas Stanulis (LTU)	376 kg	Aleksei Kosov (RUS)	369 kg	Aliaksandr Venskel (BLR)	366 kg
– 105 kg	Snatch	Rodion Bochkov (RUS)	174 kg	Vasil Gospodinov (BUL)	166 kg	Soslan Dzagaev (RUS)	166 kg
– 105 kg	Clean & Jerk	Rodion Bochkov (RUS)	211 kg	Melih Akın (TUR)	204 kg	Soslan Dzagaev (RUS)	203 kg
– 105 kg	Total	Rodion Bochkov (RUS)	385 kg	Soslan Dzagaev (RUS)	369 kg	Oleksii Ponomarenko (UKR)	368 kg
+ 105 kg	Snatch	Magomed Abuev (RUS)	192 kg	Gor Minasyan (ARM)	191 kg	Lasha Talakhadze (GEO)	190 kg
+ 105 kg	Clean & Jerk	Magomed Abuev (RUS)	232 kg	Gor Minasyan (ARM)	230 kg	Lasha Talakhadze (GEO)	222 kg
+ 105 kg	Total	Magomed Abuev (RUS)	424 kg	Gor Minasyan (ARM)	421 kg	Lasha Talakhadze (GEO)	412 kg

=== Women ===
Event		Gold		Silver		Bronze	
– 48 kg	Snatch	Wioleta Jastrzębska (POL)	68 kg	Yuliya Rypinskaya (BLR)	67 kg	Hacer Demirel (TUR)	66 kg
– 48 kg	Clean & Jerk	Yuliya Rypinskaya (BLR)	87 kg	Ekaterina Vlasova (RUS)	84 kg	Wioleta Jastrzębska (POL)	84 kg
– 48 kg	Total	Yuliya Rypinskaya (BLR)	154 kg	Wioleta Jastrzębska (POL)	152 kg	Ekaterina Vlasova (RUS)	150 kg
– 53 kg	Snatch	Cristina Iovu (MDA)	92 kg	Alena Chychkan (BLR)	90 kg	Izabella Yaylyan (ARM)	80 kg
– 53 kg	Clean & Jerk	Cristina Iovu (MDA)	115 kg	Alena Chychkan (BLR)	105 kg	Ayşegül Çoban (TUR)	103 kg
– 53 kg	Total	Cristina Iovu (MDA)	207 kg	Alena Chychkan (BLR)	195 kg	Ayşegül Çoban (TUR)	178 kg
– 58 kg	Snatch	Loredana Toma (ROU)	91 kg	Georgiana Titeş (ROU)	85 kg	Mariia Lubina (RUS)	84 kg
– 58 kg	Clean & Jerk	Loredana Toma (ROU)	112 kg	Darya Tseveleva (BLR)	111 kg	Mariia Lubina (RUS)	108 kg
– 58 kg	Total	Loredana Toma (ROU)	203 kg	Darya Tseveleva (BLR)	193 kg	Mariia Lubina (RUS)	192 kg
– 63 kg	Snatch	Darya Pachabut (BLR)	105 kg	Irina Lepșa (ROU)	99 kg	Nadiia Chibisova (UKR)	92 kg
– 63 kg	Clean & Jerk	Darya Pachabut (BLR)	124 kg	Irina Lepșa (ROU)	123 kg	Nadiia Chibisova (UKR)	120 kg
– 63 kg	Total	Darya Pachabut (BLR)	229 kg	Irina Lepșa (ROU)	222 kg	Nadiia Chibisova (UKR)	212 kg
– 69 kg	Snatch	Tima Turieva (RUS)	108 kg	Viyaleta Sechka (BLR)	97 kg	Mariya Khlyan (UKR)	96 kg
– 69 kg	Clean & Jerk	Tima Turieva (RUS)	130 kg	Viyaleta Sechka (BLR)	127 kg	Mariya Khlyan (UKR)	119 kg
– 69 kg	Total	Tima Turieva (RUS)	238 kg	Viyaleta Sechka (BLR)	224 kg	Mariya Khlyan (UKR)	215 kg
– 75 kg	Snatch	Maria Kharlova (RUS)	110 kg	Viktoryia Aniskevich (BLR)	102 kg	Galina Makarova (RUS)	98 kg
– 75 kg	Clean & Jerk	Maria Kharlova (RUS)	133 kg	Galina Makarova (RUS)	132 kg	Viktoryia Aniskevich (BLR)	113 kg
– 75 kg	Total	Maria Kharlova (RUS)	243 kg	Galina Makarova (RUS)	230 kg	Viktoryia Aniskevich (BLR)	215 kg
+ 75 kg	Snatch	Andreea Aanei (ROU)	107 kg	Yulia Zavgorodnyaya (RUS)	102 kg	Hanna Pustovarova (UKR)	97 kg
+ 75 kg	Clean & Jerk	Yulia Zavgorodnyaya (RUS)	136 kg	Andreea Aanei (ROU)	136 kg	Volha Dryla (BLR)	125 kg
+ 75 kg	Total	Andreea Aanei (ROU)	243 kg	Yulia Zavgorodnyaya (RUS)	238 kg	Volha Dryla (BLR)	219 kg

=== Medals table ===
* Host nation (Israel)

Rank	Nation	Gold	Silver	Bronze	Total
1	Russia (RUS)	15	9	9	33
2	Belarus (BLR)	8	16	7	31
3	Romania (ROU)	8	5	1	14
4	Moldova (MDA)	3	3	2	8
5	Spain (ESP)	3	1	1	5
6	Azerbaijan (AZE)	2	0	1	3
6	Lithuania (LTU)	2	0	1	3
8	Greece (GRE)	2	0	0	2
9	Georgia (GEO)	1	2	5	8
10	Poland (POL)	1	1	1	3
11	Bulgaria (BUL)	0	4	1	5
12	Armenia (ARM)	0	3	1	4
13	Turkey (TUR)	0	1	6	7
14	Ukraine (UKR)	0	0	9	9
Totals (14 entries)		45	45	45	135

== Medal overview (U23) ==
=== Men ===
Event		Gold		Silver		Bronze	
– 56 kg	Snatch	Michael Otero (ESP)	100 kg	Zeki Tuncer (TUR)	83 kg	Vitalij Sudnik (LTU)	82 kg
– 56 kg	Clean & Jerk	Michael Otero (ESP)	133 kg	Zeki Tuncer (TUR)	111 kg	Vitalij Sudnik (LTU)	96 kg
– 56 kg	Total	Michael Otero (ESP)	233 kg	Zeki Tuncer (TUR)	194 kg	Vitalij Sudnik (LTU)	178 kg
– 62 kg	Snatch	Iurie Dudoglo (MDA)	130 kg	Ferdi Nazif (BUL)	125 kg	Răzvan Nicoară (ROU)	120 kg
– 62 kg	Clean & Jerk	Iurie Dudoglo (MDA)	150 kg	Ferdi Nazif (BUL)	149 kg	Rauf Nabiyev (AZE)	148 kg
– 62 kg	Total	Iurie Dudoglo (MDA)	280 kg	Ferdi Nazif (BUL)	274 kg	Răzvan Nicoară (ROU)	267 kg
– 69 kg	Snatch	Feliks Khalibekov (RUS)	145 kg	Armen Alekyan (RUS)	142 kg	Simon Brandhuber (GER)	141 kg
– 69 kg	Clean & Jerk	Armen Alekyan (RUS)	175 kg	Serghei Cechir (MDA)	173 kg	Zorik Poghosyan (ARM)	165 kg
– 69 kg	Total	Armen Alekyan (RUS)	317 kg	Serghei Cechir (MDA)	310 kg	Feliks Khalibekov (RUS)	310 kg
– 77 kg	Snatch	Aleksandar Dimitrov (BUL)	147 kg	Eduard Savchenko (UKR)	146 kg	Adrian Ghişoiu (ROU)	145 kg
– 77 kg	Clean & Jerk	Paul Stoichiţă (ROU)	186 kg	Łukasz Krawczyk (POL)	181 kg	Aleksandar Dimitrov (BUL)	180 kg
– 77 kg	Total	Paul Stoichiţă (ROU)	328 kg	Aleksandar Dimitrov (BUL)	327 kg	Łukasz Krawczyk (POL)	316 kg
– 85 kg	Snatch	Albert Saiakhov (RUS)	170 kg	Tigran Karapetyan (ARM)	153 kg	Theodoros Iakovidis (GRE)	150 kg
– 85 kg	Clean & Jerk	Albert Saiakhov (RUS)	200 kg	Ensar Musić (CRO)	190 kg	Gheorghe Cernei (MDA)	189 kg
– 85 kg	Total	Albert Saiakhov (RUS)	370 kg	Tigran Karapetyan (ARM)	342 kg	Gheorghe Cernei (MDA)	340 kg
– 94 kg	Snatch	Marius Danciu (ROU)	171 kg	Ramazan Rasulov (RUS)	170 kg	Leho Pent (EST)	154 kg
– 94 kg	Clean & Jerk	Ramazan Rasulov (RUS)	203 kg	Marius Danciu (ROU)	193 kg	Leho Pent (EST)	184 kg
– 94 kg	Total	Ramazan Rasulov (RUS)	373 kg	Marius Danciu (ROU)	364 kg	Leho Pent (EST)	338 kg
– 105 kg	Snatch	Alexandr Chepikov (RUS)	180 kg	Nikolay Vasilyev (RUS)	180 kg	Serhiy Tahirov (UKR)	175 kg
– 105 kg	Clean & Jerk	Nikolay Vasilyev (RUS)	211 kg	Alexandr Chepikov (RUS)	210 kg	Arkadiusz Michalski (POL)	207 kg
– 105 kg	Total	Nikolay Vasilyev (RUS)	391 kg	Alexandr Chepikov (RUS)	390 kg	Arkadiusz Michalski (POL)	377 kg
+ 105 kg	Snatch	Hayk Hakobyan (ARM)	192 kg	Aleksey Lovchev (RUS)	190 kg	Jiří Orság (CZE)	186 kg
+ 105 kg	Clean & Jerk	Jiří Orság (CZE)	241 kg	Aleksey Lovchev (RUS)	235 kg	Hayk Hakobyan (ARM)	220 kg
+ 105 kg	Total	Jiří Orság (CZE)	427 kg	Aleksey Lovchev (RUS)	425 kg	Hayk Hakobyan (ARM)	412 kg

=== Women ===
Event		Gold		Silver		Bronze	
– 48 kg	Snatch	Iana Diachenko (UKR)	75 kg	Agata Fus (POL)	65 kg	Monika Grzesiak (POL)	64 kg
– 48 kg	Clean & Jerk	Iana Diachenko (UKR)	90 kg	Agata Fus (POL)	83 kg	Aleksandra Stepanova (LTU)	81 kg
– 48 kg	Total	Iana Diachenko (UKR)	165 kg	Agata Fus (POL)	148 kg	Monika Grzesiak (POL)	143 kg
– 53 kg	Snatch	Kristina Sobol (RUS)	85 kg	Emine Şensoy (TUR)	74 kg	Dana Berchi (ROU)	74 kg
– 53 kg	Clean & Jerk	Kristina Sobol (RUS)	95 kg	Dana Berchi (ROU)	90 kg	Emine Şensoy (TUR)	89 kg
– 53 kg	Total	Kristina Sobol (RUS)	180 kg	Dana Berchi (ROU)	164 kg	Emine Şensoy (TUR)	163 kg
– 58 kg	Snatch	Tatiana Aleeva (RUS)	97 kg	Iryna Mishchuk (BLR)	91 kg	Hanna Auchynnikava (BLR)	84 kg
– 58 kg	Clean & Jerk	Tatiana Aleeva (RUS)	118 kg	Iryna Mishchuk (BLR)	109 kg	Anastasiia Kelar (UKR)	108 kg
– 58 kg	Total	Tatiana Aleeva (RUS)	215 kg	Iryna Mishchuk (BLR)	200 kg	Anastasiia Kelar (UKR)	188 kg
– 63 kg	Snatch	Kateryna Driumova (UKR)	100 kg	Viktoriia Puzyreva (RUS)	100 kg	Liudmila Bryl (BLR)	93 kg
– 63 kg	Clean & Jerk	Kateryna Driumova (UKR)	120 kg	Viktoriia Puzyreva (RUS)	120 kg	Liudmila Bryl (BLR)	109 kg
– 63 kg	Total	Kateryna Driumova (UKR)	220 kg	Viktoriia Puzyreva (RUS)	220 kg	Liudmila Bryl (BLR)	202 kg
– 69 kg	Snatch	Anastasiia Romanova (RUS)	115 kg	Mariya Zubova (RUS)	113 kg	Sheila Ramos (ESP)	94 kg
– 69 kg	Clean & Jerk	Mariya Zubova (RUS)	136 kg	Anastasiia Romanova (RUS)	136 kg	Figen Kaya (TUR)	115 kg
– 69 kg	Total	Anastasiia Romanova (RUS)	251 kg	Mariya Zubova (RUS)	249 kg	Sheila Ramos (ESP)	209 kg
– 75 kg	Snatch	Oxana Karpunenko (RUS)	114 kg	Hanna Kozenko (UKR)	105 kg	Nina Schroth (GER)	96 kg
– 75 kg	Clean & Jerk	Oxana Karpunenko (RUS)	136 kg	Hanna Kozenko (UKR)	135 kg	Nina Schroth (GER)	113 kg
– 75 kg	Total	Oxana Karpunenko (RUS)	250 kg	Hanna Kozenko (UKR)	240 kg	Nina Schroth (GER)	209 kg
+ 75 kg	Snatch	Iuliia Kachaeva (RUS)	115 kg	Naira Harutyunyan (ARM)	97 kg	Krisztina Magát (HUN)	96 kg
+ 75 kg	Clean & Jerk	Iuliia Kachaeva (RUS)	147 kg	Magdalena Pasko (POL)	123 kg	Krisztina Magát (HUN)	122 kg
+ 75 kg	Total	Iuliia Kachaeva (RUS)	262 kg	Magdalena Pasko (POL)	218 kg	Krisztina Magát (HUN)	218 kg

=== Medals table ===
* Host nation (Israel)

Rank	Nation	Gold	Silver	Bronze	Total
1	Russia (RUS)	26	14	1	41
2	Ukraine (UKR)	6	4	3	13
3	Romania (ROU)	3	4	4	11
4	Moldova (MDA)	3	2	2	7
5	Spain (ESP)	3	0	2	5
6	Czech Republic (CZE)	2	0	1	3
7	Bulgaria (BUL)	1	4	1	6
8	Armenia (ARM)	1	3	3	7
9	Poland (POL)	0	6	5	11
10	Turkey (TUR)	0	4	3	7
11	Belarus (BLR)	0	3	4	7
12	Croatia (CRO)	0	1	0	1
13	Germany (GER)	0	0	4	4
13	Lithuania (LTU)	0	0	4	4
15	Estonia (EST)	0	0	3	3
15	Hungary (HUN)	0	0	3	3
17	Azerbaijan (AZE)	0	0	1	1
17	Greece (GRE)	0	0	1	1
Totals (18 entries)		45	45	45	135

== Overall medals table ==
* Host nation (Israel)

Rank	Nation	Gold	Silver	Bronze	Total
1	Russia (RUS)	41	23	10	74
2	Romania (ROU)	11	9	5	25
3	Belarus (BLR)	8	19	11	38
4	Moldova (MDA)	6	5	4	15
5	Ukraine (UKR)	6	4	12	22
6	Spain (ESP)	6	1	3	10
7	Lithuania (LTU)	2	0	5	7
8	Azerbaijan (AZE)	2	0	2	4
9	Czech Republic (CZE)	2	0	1	3
9	Greece (GRE)	2	0	1	3
11	Bulgaria (BUL)	1	8	2	11
12	Poland (POL)	1	7	6	14
13	Armenia (ARM)	1	6	4	11
14	Georgia (GEO)	1	2	5	8
15	Turkey (TUR)	0	5	9	14
16	Croatia (CRO)	0	1	0	1
17	Germany (GER)	0	0	4	4
18	Estonia (EST)	0	0	3	3
18	Hungary (HUN)	0	0	3	3
Totals (19 entries)		90	90	90	270
