= 2013 European Junior & U23 Weightlifting Championships =

International youth weightlifting competition

- Location: Tallinn, Estonia
- Dates: 20–29 September

The 2013 European Junior & U23 Weightlifting Championships were held in Tallinn, Estonia from 20 to 29 September 2013.

== Medal overview (juniors) ==
=== Men ===
Event		Gold		Silver		Bronze	
– 56 kg	Snatch	Eduard Sadykov (RUS)	110 kg	Todor Chenkov (BUL)	110 kg	Dominik Kozłowski (POL)	108 kg
– 56 kg	Clean & Jerk	Mirco Scarantino (ITA)	140 kg	Smbat Margaryan (ARM)	137 kg	Todor Chenkov (BUL)	136 kg
– 56 kg	Total	Mirco Scarantino (ITA)	246 kg	Todor Chenkov (BUL)	246 kg	Smbat Margaryan (ARM)	241 kg
– 62 kg	Snatch	Florin Croitoru (ROU)	127 kg	Gergely Soóky (HUN)	123 kg	Asali Abdulgashumov (RUS)	123 kg
– 62 kg	Clean & Jerk	Florin Croitoru (ROU)	155 kg	Asali Abdulgashumov (RUS)	152 kg	Ion Ţerna (MDA)	150 kg
– 62 kg	Total	Florin Croitoru (ROU)	282 kg	Asali Abdulgashumov (RUS)	275 kg	Alexander Myshov (RUS)	271 kg
– 69 kg	Snatch	Shota Mishvelidze (GEO)	143 kg	Elkhan Aligulizada (AZE)	135 kg	Vardan Militosyan (ARM)	130 kg
– 69 kg	Clean & Jerk	Elkhan Aligulizada (AZE)	174 kg	Shota Mishvelidze (GEO)	165 kg	Vladik Karapetyan (ARM)	161 kg
– 69 kg	Total	Elkhan Aligulizada (AZE)	309 kg	Shota Mishvelidze (GEO)	308 kg	Vladik Karapetyan (ARM)	288 kg
– 77 kg	Snatch	Petr Asayonak (BLR)	153 kg	Razmik Unanyan (RUS)	146 kg	Irakli Gabritchidze (GEO)	142 kg
– 77 kg	Clean & Jerk	Razmik Unanyan (RUS)	183 kg	Petr Asayonak (BLR)	175 kg	Florin Bejenariu Carp (ROU)	168 kg
– 77 kg	Total	Razmik Unanyan (RUS)	329 kg	Petr Asayonak (BLR)	328 kg	Florin Bejenariu Carp (ROU)	310 kg
– 85 kg	Snatch	Adam Maligov (RUS)	165 kg	Oleksandr Pielieshenko (UKR)	162 kg	Georgy Sidakov (RUS)	160 kg
– 85 kg	Clean & Jerk	Adam Maligov (RUS)	200 kg	Ihor Konotop (UKR)	195 kg	Georgy Sidakov (RUS)	195 kg
– 85 kg	Total	Adam Maligov (RUS)	365 kg	Georgy Sidakov (RUS)	355 kg	Oleksandr Pielieshenko (UKR)	354 kg
– 94 kg	Snatch	Philip Kudzik (GER)	155 kg	Nailkhan Nabiyev (AZE)	153 kg	Clarence Kennedy (IRL)	148 kg
– 94 kg	Clean & Jerk	Nailkhan Nabiyev (AZE)	190 kg	Philip Kudzik (GER)	186 kg	Clarence Kennedy (IRL)	180 kg
– 94 kg	Total	Nailkhan Nabiyev (AZE)	343 kg	Philip Kudzik (GER)	341 kg	Clarence Kennedy (IRL)	328 kg
– 105 kg	Snatch	Timur Naniev (RUS)	184 kg	Jarosław Samoraj (POL)	162 kg	Efstathios Stroumpis (GRE)	156 kg
– 105 kg	Clean & Jerk	Timur Naniev (RUS)	216 kg	Efstathios Stroumpis (GRE)	200 kg	Jarosław Samoraj (POL)	195 kg
– 105 kg	Total	Timur Naniev (RUS)	400 kg	Jarosław Samoraj (POL)	357 kg	Efstathios Stroumpis (GRE)	356 kg
+ 105 kg	Snatch	Lasha Talakhadze (GEO)	190 kg	Karen Martirosian (RUS)	175 kg	Bartosz Łoziński (POL)	162 kg
+ 105 kg	Clean & Jerk	Lasha Talakhadze (GEO)	225 kg	Karen Martirosian (RUS)	200 kg	Bartosz Łoziński (POL)	198 kg
+ 105 kg	Total	Lasha Talakhadze (GEO)	415 kg	Karen Martirosian (RUS)	375 kg	Bartosz Łoziński (POL)	360 kg

=== Women ===
Event		Gold		Silver		Bronze	
– 48 kg	Snatch	Yuliya Rypinskaya (BLR)	68 kg	Rebeka Koha (LAT)	68 kg	Katarzyna Feledyn (POL)	66 kg
– 48 kg	Clean & Jerk	Yuliya Rypinskaya (BLR)	88 kg	Katarzyna Feledyn (POL)	86 kg	Rebeka Koha (LAT)	82 kg
– 48 kg	Total	Yuliya Rypinskaya (BLR)	156 kg	Katarzyna Feledyn (POL)	152 kg	Rebeka Koha (LAT)	150 kg
– 53 kg	Snatch	Irina Baimulkina (RUS)	86 kg	Gülcihan Kansızoğlu (TUR)	72 kg	Atenery Hernández (ESP)	71 kg
– 53 kg	Clean & Jerk	Irina Baimulkina (RUS)	100 kg	Gülcihan Kansızoğlu (TUR)	90 kg	Atenery Hernández (ESP)	88 kg
– 53 kg	Total	Irina Baimulkina (RUS)	186 kg	Gülcihan Kansızoğlu (TUR)	162 kg	Atenery Hernández (ESP)	159 kg
– 58 kg	Snatch	Maria Lubina (RUS)	89 kg	Loredana Heghiș (ROU)	84 kg	Izabella Yaylyan (ARM)	82 kg
– 58 kg	Clean & Jerk	Maria Lubina (RUS)	109 kg	Loredana Heghiș (ROU)	104 kg	Giorgia Russo (ITA)	101 kg
– 58 kg	Total	Maria Lubina (RUS)	198 kg	Loredana Heghiș (ROU)	188 kg	Izabella Yaylyan (ARM)	182 kg
– 63 kg	Snatch	Diana Akhmetova (RUS)	103 kg	Nadezda Likhacheva (RUS)	100 kg	Irene Martínez (ESP)	90 kg
– 63 kg	Clean & Jerk	Diana Akhmetova (RUS)	125 kg	Nadezda Likhacheva (RUS)	123 kg	Hatice Demirel (TUR)	106 kg
– 63 kg	Total	Diana Akhmetova (RUS)	228 kg	Nadezda Likhacheva (RUS)	223 kg	Irene Martínez (ESP)	195 kg
– 69 kg	Snatch	Marina Kaneva (RUS)	93 kg	Ecaterina Tretiacova (MDA)	90 kg	Milena Kruczyńska (POL)	88 kg
– 69 kg	Clean & Jerk	Marina Kaneva (RUS)	120 kg	Sümeyye Kentli (TUR)	114 kg	Ecaterina Tretiacova (MDA)	113 kg
– 69 kg	Total	Marina Kaneva (RUS)	213 kg	Ecaterina Tretiacova (MDA)	203 kg	Sümeyye Kentli (TUR)	200 kg
– 75 kg	Snatch	Lyaysan Makhiyanova (RUS)	100 kg	Maria Beloborodova (RUS)	97 kg	Valentyna Kisil (UKR)	92 kg
– 75 kg	Clean & Jerk	Lyaysan Makhiyanova (RUS)	121 kg	Maria Beloborodova (RUS)	120 kg	Valentyna Kisil (UKR)	107 kg
– 75 kg	Total	Lyaysan Makhiyanova (RUS)	221 kg	Maria Beloborodova (RUS)	217 kg	Valentyna Kisil (UKR)	199 kg
+ 75 kg	Snatch	Andreea Aanei (ROU)	114 kg	Iryna Baranovska (UKR)	93 kg	Marta Droździel (POL)	92 kg
+ 75 kg	Clean & Jerk	Andreea Aanei (ROU)	140 kg	Iryna Baranovska (UKR)	120 kg	Marta Droździel (POL)	110 kg
+ 75 kg	Total	Andreea Aanei (ROU)	254 kg	Iryna Baranovska (UKR)	213 kg	Marta Droździel (POL)	202 kg

=== Medals table ===
* Host nation (Estonia)

Rank	Nation	Gold	Silver	Bronze	Total
1	Russia (RUS)	24	13	4	41
2	Romania (ROU)	6	3	2	11
3	Georgia (GEO)	4	2	1	7
4	Azerbaijan (AZE)	4	2	0	6
4	Belarus (BLR)	4	2	0	6
6	Italy (ITA)	2	0	1	3
7	Germany (GER)	1	2	0	3
8	Ukraine (UKR)	0	5	4	9
9	Poland (POL)	0	4	10	14
10	Turkey (TUR)	0	4	2	6
11	Moldova (MDA)	0	2	2	4
12	Bulgaria (BUL)	0	2	1	3
13	Armenia (ARM)	0	1	6	7
14	Greece (GRE)	0	1	2	3
14	Latvia (LAT)	0	1	2	3
16	Hungary (HUN)	0	1	0	1
17	Spain (ESP)	0	0	5	5
18	Ireland (IRL)	0	0	3	3
Totals (18 entries)		45	45	45	135

== Medal overview (U23) ==
=== Men ===
Event		Gold		Silver		Bronze	
– 56 kg	Snatch	Sinan Tetik (TUR)	90 kg	İsmet Algül (TUR)	85 kg	Jim de Groot (NED)	85 kg
– 56 kg	Clean & Jerk	Sinan Tetik (TUR)	113 kg	İsmet Algül (TUR)	106 kg	Jim de Groot (NED)	106 kg
– 56 kg	Total	Sinan Tetik (TUR)	203 kg	İsmet Algül (TUR)	191 kg	Jim de Groot (NED)	191 kg
– 62 kg	Snatch	Stanislau Chadovich (BLR)	131 kg	Iurie Dudoglo (AZE)	130 kg	Vladimir Urumov (BUL)	124 kg
– 62 kg	Clean & Jerk	Iurie Dudoglo (AZE)	156 kg	Stanislau Chadovich (BLR)	150 kg	Vladimir Urumov (BUL)	140 kg
– 62 kg	Total	Iurie Dudoglo (AZE)	286 kg	Stanislau Chadovich (BLR)	281 kg	Vladimir Urumov (BUL)	264 kg
– 69 kg	Snatch	Simon Brandhuber (GER)	138 kg	Víctor Castro (ESP)	132 kg	Feliks Khalibekov (RUS)	131 kg
– 69 kg	Clean & Jerk	Feliks Khalibekov (RUS)	170 kg	Simon Brandhuber (GER)	163 kg	Víctor Castro (ESP)	155 kg
– 69 kg	Total	Feliks Khalibekov (RUS)	301 kg	Simon Brandhuber (GER)	301 kg	Víctor Castro (ESP)	287 kg
– 77 kg	Snatch	Giorgi Lomtadze (GEO)	148 kg	Adrian Ghişoiu (ROU)	146 kg	Alejandro González (ESP)	145 kg
– 77 kg	Clean & Jerk	Alejandro González (ESP)	185 kg	Antonis Martasidis (GRE)	181 kg	Yunder Beytula (BUL)	181 kg
– 77 kg	Total	Alejandro González (ESP)	330 kg	Giorgi Lomtadze (GEO)	328 kg	Yunder Beytula (BUL)	326 kg
– 85 kg	Snatch	Krzysztof Zwarycz (POL)	161 kg	Victor Kharchenko (RUS)	157 kg	Albert Saiakhov (RUS)	155 kg
– 85 kg	Clean & Jerk	Krzysztof Zwarycz (POL)	195 kg	Albert Saiakhov (RUS)	194 kg	Victor Kharchenko (RUS)	192 kg
– 85 kg	Total	Krzysztof Zwarycz (POL)	356 kg	Albert Saiakhov (RUS)	349 kg	Victor Kharchenko (RUS)	349 kg
– 94 kg	Snatch	Egor Klimonov (RUS)	170 kg	Dmitry Molodtsov (RUS)	168 kg	Leho Pent (EST)	160 kg
– 94 kg	Clean & Jerk	Egor Klimonov (RUS)	210 kg	Dmitry Molodtsov (RUS)	200 kg	Leho Pent (EST)	196 kg
– 94 kg	Total	Egor Klimonov (RUS)	380 kg	Dmitry Molodtsov (RUS)	368 kg	Leho Pent (EST)	356 kg
– 105 kg	Snatch	Nikolay Vasilyev (RUS)	178 kg	Artūrs Plēsnieks (LAT)	175 kg	Matej Kováč (SVK)	170 kg
– 105 kg	Clean & Jerk	Arkadiusz Michalski (POL)	221 kg	Artūrs Plēsnieks (LAT)	221 kg	Nikolay Vasilyev (RUS)	212 kg
– 105 kg	Total	Artūrs Plēsnieks (LAT)	396 kg	Arkadiusz Michalski (POL)	390 kg	Nikolay Vasilyev (RUS)	390 kg
+ 105 kg	Snatch	Magomed Abuev (RUS)	195 kg	Hayk Hakobyan (ARM)	182 kg	Krzysztof Klicki (POL)	172 kg
+ 105 kg	Clean & Jerk	Magomed Abuev (RUS)	215 kg	Krzysztof Klicki (POL)	213 kg	Soslan Kataev (RUS)	212 kg
+ 105 kg	Total	Magomed Abuev (RUS)	410 kg	Hayk Hakobyan (ARM)	393 kg	Krzysztof Klicki (POL)	385 kg

=== Women ===
Event		Gold		Silver		Bronze	
– 48 kg	Snatch	Iana Diachenko (UKR)	81 kg	Şaziye Okur (TUR)	75 kg	Wioleta Jastrzębska (POL)	66 kg
– 48 kg	Clean & Jerk	Iana Diachenko (UKR)	90 kg	Şaziye Okur (TUR)	85 kg	Wioleta Jastrzębska (POL)	84 kg
– 48 kg	Total	Iana Diachenko (UKR)	171 kg	Şaziye Okur (TUR)	160 kg	Wioleta Jastrzębska (POL)	150 kg
– 53 kg	Snatch	Kristina Sobol (RUS)	88 kg	Dana Berchi (ROU)	81 kg	Ayşegül Çoban (TUR)	77 kg
– 53 kg	Clean & Jerk	Ayşegül Çoban (TUR)	110 kg	Kristina Sobol (RUS)	103 kg	Dana Berchi (ROU)	97 kg
– 53 kg	Total	Kristina Sobol (RUS)	191 kg	Ayşegül Çoban (TUR)	187 kg	Dana Berchi (ROU)	178 kg
– 58 kg	Snatch	Nadezda Lomova (RUS)	97 kg	Iryna Mishchuk (BLR)	87 kg	Magdalena Pędzich (POL)	83 kg
– 58 kg	Clean & Jerk	Nadezda Lomova (RUS)	112 kg	Jennifer Lombardo (ITA)	103 kg	Iryna Mishchuk (BLR)	99 kg
– 58 kg	Total	Nadezda Lomova (RUS)	209 kg	Iryna Mishchuk (BLR)	186 kg	Jennifer Lombardo (ITA)	182 kg
– 63 kg	Snatch	Tatiana Aleeva (RUS)	103 kg	Olga Afanasyeva (RUS)	103 kg	Irina Lepșa (ROU)	94 kg
– 63 kg	Clean & Jerk	Tatiana Aleeva (RUS)	130 kg	Olga Afanasyeva (RUS)	121 kg	Irina Lepșa (ROU)	118 kg
– 63 kg	Total	Tatiana Aleeva (RUS)	233 kg	Olga Afanasyeva (RUS)	224 kg	Irina Lepșa (ROU)	212 kg
– 69 kg	Snatch	Mariia Zubova (RUS)	101 kg	Carita Hansson (SWE)	93 kg	Sheila Ramos (ESP)	92 kg
– 69 kg	Clean & Jerk	Mariia Zubova (RUS)	125 kg	Sheila Ramos (ESP)	118 kg	Carita Hansson (SWE)	111 kg
– 69 kg	Total	Mariia Zubova (RUS)	226 kg	Sheila Ramos (ESP)	210 kg	Carita Hansson (SWE)	204 kg
– 75 kg	Snatch	Nina Schroth (GER)	92 kg	Patrycja Piechowiak (POL)	91 kg	Meri Ilmarinen (FIN)	91 kg
– 75 kg	Clean & Jerk	Meri Ilmarinen (FIN)	114 kg	Nina Schroth (GER)	114 kg	Patrycja Piechowiak (POL)	113 kg
– 75 kg	Total	Nina Schroth (GER)	206 kg	Meri Ilmarinen (FIN)	205 kg	Patrycja Piechowiak (POL)	204 kg
+ 75 kg	Snatch	Yulia Konovalova (RUS)	120 kg	Yulia Kachaeva (RUS)	120 kg	Małgorzata Wiejak (POL)	102 kg
+ 75 kg	Clean & Jerk	Yulia Konovalova (RUS)	155 kg	Yulia Kachaeva (RUS)	150 kg	Małgorzata Wiejak (POL)	122 kg
+ 75 kg	Total	Yulia Konovalova (RUS)	275 kg	Yulia Kachaeva (RUS)	270 kg	Małgorzata Wiejak (POL)	224 kg

=== Medals table ===
* Host nation (Estonia)

Rank	Nation	Gold	Silver	Bronze	Total
1	Russia (RUS)	23	13	7	43
2	Turkey (TUR)	4	7	1	12
3	Poland (POL)	4	3	11	18
4	Germany (GER)	3	3	0	6
5	Ukraine (UKR)	3	0	0	3
6	Spain (ESP)	2	3	4	9
7	Azerbaijan (AZE)	2	1	0	3
8	Belarus (BLR)	1	4	1	6
9	Latvia (LAT)	1	2	0	3
10	Finland (FIN)	1	1	1	3
11	Georgia (GEO)	1	1	0	2
12	Romania (ROU)	0	2	5	7
13	Armenia (ARM)	0	2	0	2
14	Sweden (SWE)	0	1	2	3
15	Italy (ITA)	0	1	1	2
16	Greece (GRE)	0	1	0	1
17	Bulgaria (BUL)	0	0	5	5
18	Estonia (EST)*	0	0	3	3
18	Netherlands (NED)	0	0	3	3
20	Slovakia (SVK)	0	0	1	1
Totals (20 entries)		45	45	45	135

== Overall medals table ==
* Host nation (Estonia)

Rank	Nation	Gold	Silver	Bronze	Total
1	Russia (RUS)	47	26	11	84
2	Romania (ROU)	6	5	7	18
3	Azerbaijan (AZE)	6	3	0	9
4	Belarus (BLR)	5	6	1	12
5	Georgia (GEO)	5	3	1	9
6	Turkey (TUR)	4	11	3	18
7	Poland (POL)	4	7	21	32
8	Germany (GER)	4	5	0	9
9	Ukraine (UKR)	3	5	4	12
10	Spain (ESP)	2	3	9	14
11	Italy (ITA)	2	1	2	5
12	Latvia (LAT)	1	3	2	6
13	Finland (FIN)	1	1	1	3
14	Armenia (ARM)	0	3	6	9
15	Bulgaria (BUL)	0	2	6	8
16	Greece (GRE)	0	2	2	4
16	Moldova (MDA)	0	2	2	4
18	Sweden (SWE)	0	1	2	3
19	Hungary (HUN)	0	1	0	1
20	Estonia (EST)*	0	0	3	3
20	Ireland (IRL)	0	0	3	3
20	Netherlands (NED)	0	0	3	3
23	Slovakia (SVK)	0	0	1	1
Totals (23 entries)		90	90	90	270
