= 2014 European Junior & U23 Weightlifting Championships =

International weightlifting competition

The 2014 European Junior & U23 Weightlifting Championships were held in Limassol, Cyprus from 21 November to 29 November 2014.

== Medal overview (juniors) ==
=== Men ===
| Event | | Gold | | Silver | | Bronze | |
| – 56 kg | Snatch | Mirco Scarantino (ITA) | 108 kg | Ilie Constantin Ciotoiu (ROU) | 102 kg | Emrah Çalışkan (TUR) | 101 kg |
| – 56 kg | Clean & Jerk | Mirco Scarantino (ITA) | 132 kg | Ilie Constantin Ciotoiu (ROU) | 122 kg | Ferdi Hardal (TUR) | 121 kg |
| – 56 kg | Total | Mirco Scarantino (ITA) | 240 kg | Ilie Constantin Ciotoiu (ROU) | 224 kg | Ferdi Hardal (TUR) | 218 kg |
| – 62 kg | Snatch | Asali Abdulgashumov (RUS) | 126 kg | Daniel-Florin Vizitiu (ROU) | 125 kg | Rustam Imanzade (AZE) | 122 kg |
| – 62 kg | Clean & Jerk | Asali Abdulgashumov (RUS) | 155 kg | Michael Di Giusto (ITA) | 149 kg | Daniel-Florin Vizitiu (ROU) | 148 kg |
| – 62 kg | Total | Asali Abdulgashumov (RUS) | 281 kg | Daniel-Florin Vizitiu (ROU) | 273 kg | Michael Di Giusto (ITA) | 266 kg |
| – 69 kg | Snatch | Sergei Petrov (RUS) | 146 kg | David Sánchez (ESP) | 137 kg | Daniel Bajer (POL) | 132 kg |
| – 69 kg | Clean & Jerk | Sergei Petrov (RUS) | 177 kg | David Sánchez (ESP) | 176 kg | Daniel Bajer (POL) | 159 kg |
| – 69 kg | Total | Sergei Petrov (RUS) | 323 kg | David Sánchez (ESP) | 313 kg | Daniel Bajer (POL) | 291 kg |
| – 77 kg | Snatch | Victor Getts (RUS) | 160 kg | Irakli Gabritchidze (GEO) | 145 kg | Patryk Slowikowski (POL) | 141 kg |
| – 77 kg | Clean & Jerk | Victor Getts (RUS) | 195 kg | Norayr Avetisyan (ARM) | 180 kg | Hakob Mkrtchyan (ARM) | 176 kg |
| – 77 kg | Total | Victor Getts (RUS) | 355 kg | Norayr Avetisyan (ARM) | 318 kg | Hakob Mkrtchyan (ARM) | 313 kg |
| – 85 kg | Snatch | Iurie Bulat (MDA) | 162 kg | Aleksei Osipov (RUS) | 155 kg | Igor Konotop (UKR) | 148 kg |
| – 85 kg | Clean & Jerk | Iurie Bulat (MDA) | 189 kg | Aleksei Osipov (RUS) | 187 kg | Igor Konotop (UKR) | 186 kg |
| – 85 kg | Total | Iurie Bulat (MDA) | 351 kg | Aleksei Osipov (RUS) | 342 kg | Igor Konotop (UKR) | 334 kg |
| – 94 kg | Snatch | Georgii Kuptsov (RUS) | 175 kg | Dadash Dadashbayli (AZE) | 167 kg | Volodymyr Hoza (UKR) | 167 kg |
| – 94 kg | Clean & Jerk | Georgii Kuptsov (RUS) | 210 kg | Dadash Dadashbayli (AZE) | 193 kg | Volodymyr Hoza (UKR) | 191 kg |
| – 94 kg | Total | Georgii Kuptsov (RUS) | 385 kg | Dadash Dadashbayli (AZE) | 360 kg | Volodymyr Hoza (UKR) | 358 kg |
| – 105 kg | Snatch | Simon Martirosyan (ARM) | 184 kg | Marchel Guydya (RUS) | 175 kg | Jaroslaw Pawel Samoraj (POL) | 171 kg |
| – 105 kg | Clean & Jerk | Marchel Guydya (RUS) | 219 kg | Simon Martirosyan (ARM) | 210 kg | Giorgi Chkheidze (GEO) | 201 kg |
| – 105 kg | Total | Marchel Guydya (RUS) | 394 kg | Simon Martirosyan (ARM) | 394 kg | Jaroslaw Pawel Samoraj (POL) | 371 kg |
| + 105 kg | Snatch | Antoniy Savchuk (RUS) | 185 kg | Egor Ivanov (RUS) | 170 kg | Mukyta Proshynskyi (UKR) | 160 kg |
| + 105 kg | Clean & Jerk | Antoniy Savchuk (RUS) | 230 kg | Egor Ivanov (RUS) | 205 kg | Tamaš Kajdoči (SRB) | 191 kg |
| + 105 kg | Total | Antoniy Savchuk (RUS) | 415 kg | Egor Ivanov (RUS) | 375 kg | Tamaš Kajdoči (SRB) | 347 kg |

=== Women ===
| Event | | Gold | | Silver | | Bronze | |
| – 48 kg | Snatch | Monica-Suneta Csengeri (ROU) | 74 kg | Iana Mokhina (RUS) | 73 kg | Nadiia Iefimchuk (UKR) | 69 kg |
| – 48 kg | Clean & Jerk | Iana Mokhina (RUS) | 94 kg | Monica-Suneta Csengeri (ROU) | 90 kg | Yuliya Asayonak (BLR) | 89 kg |
| – 48 kg | Total | Iana Mokhina (RUS) | 167 kg | Monica-Suneta Csengeri (ROU) | 164 kg | Yuliya Asayonak (BLR) | 156 kg |
| – 53 kg | Snatch | Irina Baymulkina (RUS) | 83 kg | Rebeka Koha (LAT) | 80 kg | Atenery Hernández (ESP) | 80 kg |
| – 53 kg | Clean & Jerk | Irina Baymulkina (RUS) | 98 kg | Rebeka Koha (LAT) | 96 kg | Atenery Hernández (ESP) | 96 kg |
| – 53 kg | Total | Irina Baymulkina (RUS) | 181 kg | Rebeka Koha (LAT) | 176 kg | Atenery Hernández (ESP) | 176 kg |
| – 58 kg | Snatch | Veronika Ivasiuk (UKR) | 85 kg | Izabella Yaylyan (ARM) | 85 kg | Dora Tchakounté (FRA) | 81 kg |
| – 58 kg | Clean & Jerk | Izabella Yaylyan (ARM) | 106 kg | Alba Sánchez (ESP) | 103 kg | Veronika Ivasiuk (UKR) | 102 kg |
| – 58 kg | Total | Izabella Yaylyan (ARM) | 191 kg | Veronika Ivasiuk (UKR) | 187 kg | Dora Tchakounté (FRA) | 183 kg |
| – 63 kg | Snatch | Diana Akhmetova (RUS) | 109 kg | Olena Kokhanenko (UKR) | 89 kg | Alona Shevkoplyas (UKR) | 89 kg |
| – 63 kg | Clean & Jerk | Diana Akhmetova (RUS) | 121 kg | Mehtap Kurnaz (TUR) | 108 kg | Olena Kokhanenko (UKR) | 108 kg |
| – 63 kg | Total | Diana Akhmetova (RUS) | 230 kg | Olena Kokhanenko (UKR) | 197 kg | Mehtap Kurnaz (TUR) | 196 kg |
| – 69 kg | Snatch | Ksenia Maksimova (RUS) | 105 kg | Ecaterina Tretiacova (MDA) | 93 kg | Duygu Aynacı (TUR) | 90 kg |
| – 69 kg | Clean & Jerk | Ksenia Maksimova (RUS) | 136 kg | Bianca-Mihaela Ionita (ROU) | 112 kg | Ecaterina Tretiacova (MDA) | 111 kg |
| – 69 kg | Total | Ksenia Maksimova (RUS) | 241 kg | Ecaterina Tretiacova (MDA) | 204 kg | Bianca-Mihaela Ionita (ROU) | 199 kg |
| – 75 kg | Snatch | Maria Beloborodova (RUS) | 115 kg | Aksana Yermolenka (BLR) | 96 kg | Valentyna Kisil (UKR) | 94 kg |
| – 75 kg | Clean & Jerk | Maria Beloborodova (RUS) | 140 kg | Aksana Yermolenka (BLR) | 118 kg | Mercy Brown (GBR) | 118 kg |
| – 75 kg | Total | Maria Beloborodova (RUS) | 255 kg | Aksana Yermolenka (BLR) | 214 kg | Mercy Brown (GBR) | 208 kg |
| + 75 kg | Snatch | Anastasiya Lysenko (UKR) | 120 kg | Dzhesika Ivanova (BUL) | 87 kg | Barbara Gyurus (HUN) | 76 kg |
| + 75 kg | Clean & Jerk | Anastasiya Lysenko (UKR) | 145 kg | Dzhesika Ivanova (BUL) | 105 kg | Barbara Gyurus (HUN) | 92 kg |
| + 75 kg | Total | Anastasiya Lysenko (UKR) | 265 kg | Dzhesika Ivanova (BUL) | 192 kg | Barbara Gyurus (HUN) | 168 kg |

=== Medals table ===
| Rank | Nation | Gold | Silver | Bronze | Total |
|---|---|---|---|---|---|
| 1 | Russia (RUS) | 31 | 8 | 0 | 39 |
| 2 | Ukraine (UKR) | 4 | 3 | 12 | 19 |
| 3 | Armenia (ARM) | 3 | 5 | 2 | 10 |
| 4 | Moldova (MDA) | 3 | 2 | 1 | 6 |
| 5 | Italy (ITA) | 3 | 1 | 1 | 5 |
| 6 | Romania (ROU) | 1 | 8 | 2 | 11 |
| 7 | Spain (ESP) | 0 | 4 | 3 | 7 |
| 8 | Belarus (BLR) | 0 | 3 | 2 | 5 |
| 9 | Azerbaijan (AZE) | 0 | 3 | 1 | 4 |
| 10 | Bulgaria (BUL) | 0 | 3 | 0 | 3 |
| 10 | Latvia (LAT) | 0 | 3 | 0 | 3 |
| 12 | Turkey (TUR) | 0 | 1 | 5 | 6 |
| 13 | Georgia (GEO) | 0 | 1 | 1 | 2 |
| 14 | Poland (POL) | 0 | 0 | 6 | 6 |
| 15 | Hungary (HUN) | 0 | 0 | 3 | 3 |
| 16 | France (FRA) | 0 | 0 | 2 | 2 |
| 16 | Great Britain (GBR) | 0 | 0 | 2 | 2 |
| 16 | Serbia (SRB) | 0 | 0 | 2 | 2 |
| Totals (18 entries) | | 45 | 45 | 45 | 135 |

== Medal overview (U23) ==
=== Men ===
| Event | | Gold | | Silver | | Bronze | |
| – 56 kg | Snatch | Josué Brachi (ESP) | 117 kg | Asen Muradov (BUL) | 116 kg | Dominik Kozłowski (POL) | 110 kg |
| – 56 kg | Clean & Jerk | Smbat Margaryan (ARM) | 145 kg | Josué Brachi (ESP) | 139 kg | Vanik Mkrtumian (RUS) | 136 kg |
| – 56 kg | Total | Josué Brachi (ESP) | 256 kg | Smbat Margaryan (ARM) | 252 kg | Asen Muradov (BUL) | 251 kg |
| – 62 kg | Snatch | Stanislau Chadovich (BLR) | 132 kg | Ionuț Ilie (ROU) | 127 kg | Florin Ionut Croitoru (ROU) | 126 kg |
| – 62 kg | Clean & Jerk | Stanislau Chadovich (BLR) | 158 kg | Ion Terna (MDA) | 151 kg | Ionuț Ilie (ROU) | 147 kg |
| – 62 kg | Total | Stanislau Chadovich (BLR) | 290 kg | Ion Terna (MDA) | 276 kg | Ionuț Ilie (ROU) | 274 kg |
| – 69 kg | Snatch | Simon Brandhuber (GER) | 138 kg | Victor Castro (ESP) | 135 kg | Zlatko Minchev (BUL) | 133 kg |
| – 69 kg | Clean & Jerk | Victor Castro (ESP) | 163 kg | Gokhan Ozenoglu (TUR) | 162 kg | Simon Brandhuber (GER) | 159 kg |
| – 69 kg | Total | Victor Castro (ESP) | 298 kg | Simon Brandhuber (GER) | 297 kg | Gokhan Ozenoglu (TUR) | 288 kg |
| – 77 kg | Snatch | Max Lang (GER) | 152 kg | Petr Asayonak (BLR) | 151 kg | Andrés Mata (ESP) | 150 kg |
| – 77 kg | Clean & Jerk | Andrés Mata (ESP) | 188 kg | Max Lang (GER) | 185 kg | Petr Asayonak (BLR) | 176 kg |
| – 77 kg | Total | Andrés Mata (ESP) | 338 kg | Max Lang (GER) | 337 kg | Petr Asayonak (BLR) | 327 kg |
| – 85 kg | Snatch | Albert Sayakhov (RUS) | 167 kg | Hysen Pulaku (ALB) | 166 kg | Victor Kharchenko (RUS) | 163 kg |
| – 85 kg | Clean & Jerk | Hysen Pulaku (ALB) | 203 kg | Albert Sayakhov (RUS) | 203 kg | Antonis Martasidis (GRE) | 196 kg |
| – 85 kg | Total | Albert Sayakhov (RUS) | 370 kg | Hysen Pulaku (ALB) | 369 kg | Victor Kharchenko (RUS) | 355 kg |
| – 94 kg | Snatch | Egor Klimonov (RUS) | 174 kg | Zygimantas Stanulis (LTU) | 170 kg | Georgi Shikov (BUL) | 162 kg |
| – 94 kg | Clean & Jerk | Egor Klimonov (RUS) | 202 kg | Zygimantas Stanulis (LTU) | 201 kg | Georgi Shikov (BUL) | 200 kg |
| – 94 kg | Total | Egor Klimonov (RUS) | 376 kg | Zygimantas Stanulis (LTU) | 371 kg | Georgi Shikov (BUL) | 362 kg |
| – 105 kg | Snatch | Artūrs Plēsnieks (LAT) | 176 kg | Soslan Dzagaev (RUS) | 175 kg | Roman Vasylevskyi (UKR) | 170 kg |
| – 105 kg | Clean & Jerk | Artūrs Plēsnieks (LAT) | 215 kg | Leonard Cobzariu (ROU) | 205 kg | Soslan Dzagaev (RUS) | 204 kg |
| – 105 kg | Total | Artūrs Plēsnieks (LAT) | 391 kg | Soslan Dzagaev (RUS) | 379 kg | Matej Kovac (SVK) | 374 kg |
| + 105 kg | Snatch | Aleksei Seliutin (RUS) | 175 kg | Radoslav Tatarčík (SVK) | 174 kg | Vasyl Pylypenko (UKR) | 168 kg |
| + 105 kg | Clean & Jerk | Aleksei Seliutin (RUS) | 211 kg | Vasyl Pylypenko (UKR) | 210 kg | Przemyslaw Budek (POL) | 206 kg |
| + 105 kg | Total | Aleksei Seliutin (RUS) | 386 kg | Vasyl Pylypenko (UKR) | 378 kg | Przemyslaw Budek (POL) | 361 kg |

=== Women ===
| Event | | Gold | | Silver | | Bronze | |
| – 48 kg | Snatch | Wioleta Jastrzębska (POL) | 71 kg | Hacer Demirel (TUR) | 69 kg | Natalia Draganova (BUL) | 65 kg |
| – 48 kg | Clean & Jerk | Hacer Demirel (TUR) | 89 kg | Wioleta Jastrzębska (POL) | 89 kg | Natalia Draganova (BUL) | 79 kg |
| – 48 kg | Total | Wioleta Jastrzębska (POL) | 160 kg | Hacer Demirel (TUR) | 158 kg | Natalia Draganova (BUL) | 144 kg |
| – 53 kg | Snatch | Boyanka Kostova (AZE) | 93 kg | Kristina Sobol (RUS) | 92 kg | Olga Golovanova (RUS) | 80 kg |
| – 53 kg | Clean & Jerk | Aysegul Coban (TUR) | 111 kg | Boyanka Kostova (AZE) | 110 kg | Kristina Sobol (RUS) | 107 kg |
| – 53 kg | Total | Boyanka Kostova (AZE) | 203 kg | Kristina Sobol (RUS) | 199 kg | Aysegul Coban (TUR) | 190 kg |
| – 58 kg | Snatch | Irina Lepșa (ROU) | 93 kg | Mariia Lubina (RUS) | 93 kg | Konstantina Benteli (GRE) | 84 kg |
| – 58 kg | Clean & Jerk | Irina Lepșa (ROU) | 115 kg | Mariia Lubina (RUS) | 115 kg | Loredana Heghiș (ROU) | 106 kg |
| – 58 kg | Total | Irina Lepșa (ROU) | 208 kg | Mariia Lubina (RUS) | 208 kg | Jennifer Lombardo (ITA) | 189 kg |
| – 63 kg | Snatch | Natalia Khlestkina (RUS) | 108 kg | Irene Martínez (ESP) | 91 kg | Sabine Kusterer (GER) | 89 kg |
| – 63 kg | Clean & Jerk | Natalia Khlestkina (RUS) | 137 kg | Eda Çakal (TUR) | 114 kg | Liudmila Bryl (BLR) | 111 kg |
| – 63 kg | Total | Natalia Khlestkina (RUS) | 245 kg | Eda Çakal (TUR) | 200 kg | Liudmila Bryl (BLR) | 199 kg |
| – 69 kg | Snatch | Mariya Khlyan (UKR) | 98 kg | Carita Hansson (SWE) | 95 kg | Patrycja Piechowiak (POL) | 93 kg |
| – 69 kg | Clean & Jerk | Mariya Khlyan (UKR) | 119 kg | Carita Hansson (SWE) | 115 kg | Anastassiya Ibrahimli (AZE) | 115 kg |
| – 69 kg | Total | Mariya Khlyan (UKR) | 217 kg | Carita Hansson (SWE) | 210 kg | Anastassiya Ibrahimli (AZE) | 207 kg |
| – 75 kg | Snatch | Ekaterina Katina (RUS) | 100 kg | Ganna Kozenko (UKR) | 98 kg | Meri Ilmarinen (FIN) | 97 kg |
| – 75 kg | Clean & Jerk | Ekaterina Katina (RUS) | 140 kg | Ganna Kozenko (UKR) | 120 kg | Meri Ilmarinen (FIN) | 115 kg |
| – 75 kg | Total | Ekaterina Katina (RUS) | 240 kg | Ganna Kozenko (UKR) | 218 kg | Meri Ilmarinen (FIN) | 212 kg |
| + 75 kg | Snatch | Ekaterina Iutvolina (RUS) | 112 kg | Andreea Aanei (ROU) | 106 kg | Magdalena Pasko (POL) | 95 kg |
| + 75 kg | Clean & Jerk | Ekaterina Iutvolina (RUS) | 141 kg | Andreea Aanei (ROU) | 135 kg | Magdalena Pasko (POL) | 128 kg |
| + 75 kg | Total | Ekaterina Iutvolina (RUS) | 253 kg | Andreea Aanei (ROU) | 241 kg | Magdalena Pasko (POL) | 223 kg |

=== Medals table ===
| Rank | Nation | Gold | Silver | Bronze | Total |
|---|---|---|---|---|---|
| 1 | Russia (RUS) | 17 | 8 | 6 | 31 |
| 2 | Spain (ESP) | 6 | 3 | 1 | 10 |
| 3 | Romania (ROU) | 3 | 5 | 4 | 12 |
| 4 | Ukraine (UKR) | 3 | 5 | 2 | 10 |
| 5 | Belarus (BLR) | 3 | 1 | 4 | 8 |
| 6 | Latvia (LAT) | 3 | 0 | 0 | 3 |
| 7 | Turkey (TUR) | 2 | 5 | 2 | 9 |
| 8 | Germany (GER) | 2 | 3 | 2 | 7 |
| 9 | Poland (POL) | 2 | 1 | 7 | 10 |
| 10 | Azerbaijan (AZE) | 2 | 1 | 2 | 5 |
| 11 | Albania (ALB) | 1 | 2 | 0 | 3 |
| 12 | Armenia (ARM) | 1 | 1 | 0 | 2 |
| 13 | Lithuania (LTU) | 0 | 3 | 0 | 3 |
| 13 | Sweden (SWE) | 0 | 3 | 0 | 3 |
| 15 | Moldova (MDA) | 0 | 2 | 0 | 2 |
| 16 | Bulgaria (BUL) | 0 | 1 | 8 | 9 |
| 17 | Slovakia (SVK) | 0 | 1 | 1 | 2 |
| 18 | Finland (FIN) | 0 | 0 | 3 | 3 |
| 19 | Greece (GRE) | 0 | 0 | 2 | 2 |
| 20 | Italy (ITA) | 0 | 0 | 1 | 1 |
| Totals (20 entries) | | 45 | 45 | 45 | 135 |

== Overall medals table ==
| Rank | Nation | Gold | Silver | Bronze | Total |
|---|---|---|---|---|---|
| 1 | Russia (RUS) | 48 | 16 | 6 | 70 |
| 2 | Ukraine (UKR) | 7 | 8 | 14 | 29 |
| 3 | Spain (ESP) | 6 | 7 | 4 | 17 |
| 4 | Romania (ROU) | 4 | 13 | 6 | 23 |
| 5 | Armenia (ARM) | 4 | 6 | 2 | 12 |
| 6 | Belarus (BLR) | 3 | 4 | 6 | 13 |
| 7 | Moldova (MDA) | 3 | 4 | 1 | 8 |
| 8 | Latvia (LAT) | 3 | 3 | 0 | 6 |
| 9 | Italy (ITA) | 3 | 1 | 2 | 6 |
| 10 | Turkey (TUR) | 2 | 6 | 7 | 15 |
| 11 | Azerbaijan (AZE) | 2 | 4 | 3 | 9 |
| 12 | Germany (GER) | 2 | 3 | 2 | 7 |
| 13 | Poland (POL) | 2 | 1 | 13 | 16 |
| 14 | Albania (ALB) | 1 | 2 | 0 | 3 |
| 15 | Bulgaria (BUL) | 0 | 4 | 8 | 12 |
| 16 | Lithuania (LTU) | 0 | 3 | 0 | 3 |
| 16 | Sweden (SWE) | 0 | 3 | 0 | 3 |
| 18 | Georgia (GEO) | 0 | 1 | 1 | 2 |
| 18 | Slovakia (SVK) | 0 | 1 | 1 | 2 |
| 20 | Finland (FIN) | 0 | 0 | 3 | 3 |
| 20 | Hungary (HUN) | 0 | 0 | 3 | 3 |
| 22 | France (FRA) | 0 | 0 | 2 | 2 |
| 22 | Great Britain (GBR) | 0 | 0 | 2 | 2 |
| 22 | Greece (GRE) | 0 | 0 | 2 | 2 |
| 22 | Serbia (SRB) | 0 | 0 | 2 | 2 |
| Totals (25 entries) | | 90 | 90 | 90 | 270 |
