= List of German records in Olympic weightlifting =

The following are the national records in Olympic weightlifting in Germany. Records are maintained in each weight class for the snatch lift, clean and jerk lift, and the total for both lifts by the Bundesverband Deutscher Gewichtheber (BVDG).

== Current records ==
=== Men ===
Event	Record	Athlete	Date	Meet	Place	Ref
60 kg
Snatch						
Clean & Jerk						
Total						
65 kg
Snatch						
Clean & Jerk						
Total						
71 kg
Snatch						
Clean & Jerk						
Total						
79 kg
Snatch						
Clean & Jerk						
Total						
88 kg
Snatch						
Clean & Jerk						
Total						
94 kg
Snatch						
Clean & Jerk						
Total						
110 kg
Snatch						
Clean & Jerk						
Total						
+110 kg
Snatch						
Clean & Jerk						
Total						

=== Women ===
Event	Record	Athlete	Date	Meet	Place	Ref
48 kg
Snatch						
Clean & Jerk						
Total						
53 kg
Snatch						
Clean & Jerk						
Total						
58 kg
Snatch						
Clean & Jerk						
Total						
63 kg
Snatch						
Clean & Jerk						
Total						
69 kg
Snatch						
Clean & Jerk						
Total						
77 kg
Snatch						
Clean & Jerk						
Total						
86 kg
Snatch						
Clean & Jerk						
Total						
+86 kg
Snatch						
Clean & Jerk						
Total						

== Historical records ==
=== Men (2018–2025) ===
Event	Record	Athlete	Date	Meet	Place	Ref
55 kg
Snatch	105 kg	Leon Schedler	26 September 2021	European U23 Championships	Rovaniemi, Finland	
Clean & Jerk	132 kg	Leon Schedler	20 October 2019	European U23 Championships	Bucharest, Romania	
Total	235 kg	Leon Schedler	26 September 2021	European U23 Championships	Rovaniemi, Finland	
61 kg
Snatch	134 kg	Simon Brandhuber	29 May 2022	European Championships	Tirana, Albania	
Clean & Jerk	162 kg	Jon Mau	4 April 2021	European Championships	Moscow, Russia	
Total	287 kg	Simon Brandhuber	6 September 2023	World Championships	Riyadh, Saudi Arabia	
67 kg
Snatch	146 kg	Simon Brandhuber	3 November 2018	World Championships	Ashgabat, Turkmenistan	
Clean & Jerk	165 kg	Simon Brandhuber	8 April 2019	European Championships	Batumi, Georgia	
Total	311 kg	Simon Brandhuber	8 April 2019	European Championships	Batumi, Georgia	
73 kg
Snatch	155 kg	Roberto Gutu	16 April 2025	European Championships	Chișinău, Moldova	
Clean & Jerk	185 kg	Max Lang	6 April 2021	European Championships	Moscow, Russia	
Total	335 kg	Roberto Gutu	16 April 2025	European Championships	Chișinău, Moldova	
81 kg
Snatch	160 kg	Nico Müller	22 December 2019	Qatar Cup	Doha, Qatar	
Clean & Jerk	198 kg	Nico Müller	3 March 2019	Fajr Cup	Tehran, Iran	
Total	355 kg	Nico Müller	3 March 2019	Fajr Cup	Tehran, Iran	
89 kg
Snatch	171 kg	Raphael Friedrich	18 April 2025	European Championships	Chișinău, Moldova	
Clean & Jerk	205 kg	Raphael Friedrich	18 April 2025	European Championships	Chișinău, Moldova	
Total	376 kg	Raphael Friedrich	18 April 2025	European Championships	Chișinău, Moldova	
96 kg
Snatch	166 kg	Matthäus Hofmann	4 September 2021		Berlin, Germany	
Clean & Jerk	200 kg	Jürgen Spieß	24 September 2019	World Championships	Pattaya, Thailand	
Total	360 kg	Jürgen Spieß	24 September 2019	World Championships	Pattaya, Thailand	
102 kg
Snatch	172 kg	Matthäus Hofmann	22 April 2023	European Championships	Yerevan, Armenia	
Clean & Jerk	201 kg	Matthäus Hofmann	22 April 2023	European Championships	Yerevan, Armenia	
Total	373 kg	Matthäus Hofmann	22 April 2023	European Championships	Yerevan, Armenia	
109 kg
Snatch	172 kg	Matthäus Hofmann	19 February 2024	European Championships	Sofia, Bulgaria	
Clean & Jerk	207 kg	Standard				
Total	378 kg	Matthäus Hofmann	19 February 2024	European Championships	Sofia, Bulgaria	
+109 kg
Snatch	188 kg	Standard				
Clean & Jerk	232 kg	Standard				
Total	420 kg	Standard				

=== Men (1998–2018) ===
Event	Record	Athlete	Date	Meet	Place	Ref
-56 kg
Snatch	105 kg	Volker Gdanietz	16 October 1993		Berlin, Germany	
Clean & Jerk	138 kg	Volker Gdanietz	9 March 1996		Berlin, Germany	
Total	240 kg	Volker Gdanietz	9 March 1996		Berlin, Germany	
-62 kg
Snatch	123 kg	Marco Spanehl	1 October 1993		Stralsund, Germany	
Clean & Jerk	157.5 kg	Marco Spanehl	13 October 1995	National Championships	Hassloch, Germany	
Total	280 kg	Marco Spanehl	13 October 1995	National Championships	Hassloch, Germany	
-69 kg
Snatch	145 kg	Andreas Behm	29 July 1992	Olympic Games	Barcelona, Spain	
Clean & Jerk	185 kg	Andreas Behm	30 September 1991	World Championships	Donaueschingen, Germany	
Total	327.5 kg	Andreas Behm	30 September 1991	World Championships	Donaueschingen, Germany	
-77 kg
Snatch	165 kg	Ingo Steinhöfel	22 November 1994	World Championships	Istanbul, Turkey	
Clean & Jerk	197.5 kg	Ingo Steinhöfel	22 November 1994	World Championships	Istanbul, Turkey	
Total	362.5 kg	Ingo Steinhöfel	22 November 1994	World Championships	Istanbul, Turkey	
-85 kg
Snatch	177.5 kg	Marc Huster	26 November 1999	World Championships	Athens, Greece	
Clean & Jerk	215 kg	Marc Huster	17 April 1999	European Championships	A Coruña, Spain	
Total	390 kg	Marc Huster	23 September 2000	Olympic Games	Sydney, Australia	
-94 kg
Snatch	182.5 kg	Oliver Caruso	2 May 1998	European Championships	Riesa, Germany	
Clean & Jerk	215 kg	Marc Huster	14 October 1995	National Championships	Hassloch, Germany	
Total	395 kg	Oliver Caruso	2 May 1998	European Championships	Riesa, Germany	
-105 kg
Snatch	185 kg	Andre Rohde	25 November 2002	World Championships	Warsaw, Poland	
Clean & Jerk	225 kg	Andre Rohde	25 April 2004	European Championships	Kyiv, Ukraine	
Total	407.5 kg	Andre Rohde	25 November 2002	World Championships	Warsaw, Poland	
+105 kg
Snatch	210 kg	Ronny Weller	26 September 2000	Olympic Games	Sydney, Australia	
Clean & Jerk	260 kg	Ronny Weller	3 May 1998	European Championships	Riesa, Germany	
Total	467.5 kg	Ronny Weller	26 September 2000	Olympic Games	Sydney, Australia	

=== Women (2018–2025) ===
Event	Record	Athlete	Date	Meet	Place	Ref
45 kg
Snatch	66 kg	Standard				
Clean & Jerk	84 kg	Standard				
Total	150 kg	Standard				
49 kg
Snatch	70 kg	Standard				
Clean & Jerk	90 kg	Standard				
Total	160 kg	Standard				
55 kg
Snatch	84 kg	Annika Pilz	17 October 2022	European Junior Championships	Durrës, Albania	
Clean & Jerk	103 kg	Annika Pilz	16 April 2023	European Championships	Yerevan, Armenia	
Total	186 kg	Annika Pilz	16 April 2023	European Championships	Yerevan, Armenia	
59 kg
Snatch	94 kg	Sabine Kusterer	8 April 2019	European Championships	Batumi, Georgia	
Clean & Jerk	113 kg	Sabine Kusterer	12 May 2021		Cali, Colombia	
Total	207 kg	Sabine Kusterer	12 May 2021		Cali, Colombia	
64 kg
Snatch	100 kg	Lisa Schweizer	6 April 2021	European Championships	Moscow, Russia	
Clean & Jerk	120 kg	Lisa Schweizer	13 May 2021		Cali, Colombia	
Total	220 kg	Lisa Schweizer	13 May 2021		Cali, Colombia	
71 kg
Snatch	108 kg	Lisa Schweizer	17 April 2025	European Championships	Chișinău, Moldova	
Clean & Jerk	124 kg	Lisa Schweizer	16 February 2024	European Championships	Sofia, Bulgaria	
Total	231 kg	Lisa Schweizer	16 February 2024	European Championships	Sofia, Bulgaria	
76 kg
Snatch	101 kg	Lara Dancz	17 February 2024	European Championships	Sofia, Bulgaria	
Clean & Jerk	120 kg	Patricia Rieger	8 April 2021	European Championships	Moscow, Russia	
Total	217 kg	Patricia Rieger	13 May 2021		Cali, Colombia	
81 kg
Snatch	103 kg	Nina Schroth	14 December 2022	World Championships	Bogotá, Colombia	
Clean & Jerk	121 kg	Standard				
Total	222 kg	Nina Schroth	12 April 2019	European Championships	Batumi, Georgia	
87 kg
Snatch	104 kg	Nina Schroth	19 February 2024	European Championships	Sofia, Bulgaria	
Clean & Jerk	123 kg	Nina Schroth	30 October 2022	German Championships	Böbingen, Germany	
Total	225 kg	Nina Schroth	27 April 2019	1. Bundesliga Final	Obrigheim, Germany	
+87 kg
Snatch	111 kg	Kiara Klug	21 April 2025	European Championships	Chișinău, Moldova	
Clean & Jerk	131 kg	Kiara Klug	21 April 2025	European Championships	Chișinău, Moldova	
Total	242 kg	Kiara Klug	21 April 2025	European Championships	Chișinău, Moldova	

=== Women (1998–2018) ===
Event	Record	Athlete	Date	Meet	Place	Ref
48 kg
Snatch	75 kg	Julia Schwarzbach	21 November 2015	World Championships	Houston, United States	
Clean & Jerk	95 kg	Julia Schwarzbach	21 November 2015	World Championships	Houston, United States	
Total	170 kg	Julia Schwarzbach	21 November 2015	World Championships	Houston, United States	
53 kg
Snatch	87 kg	Julia Rohde	10 April 2012	European Championships	Antalya, Turkey	
Clean & Jerk	108 kg	Julia Rohde	29 July 2012	Olympic Games	London, Great Britain	
Total	193 kg	Julia Rohde	29 July 2012	Olympic Games	London, Great Britain	
58 kg
Snatch	93 kg	Christin Ulrich	30 July 2012	Olympic Games	London, Great Britain	
Clean & Jerk	114 kg	Christin Ulrich	30 July 2012	Olympic Games	London, Great Britain	
Total	207 kg	Christin Ulrich	30 July 2012	Olympic Games	London, Great Britain	
63 kg
Snatch	93 kg	Sabine Kusterer	10 April 2014	European Championships	Tel Aviv, Israel	
Clean & Jerk	117.5 kg	Anja Reinfrank	21 April 2004	European Championships	Kyiv, Ukraine	
Total	205 kg	Sabine Kusterer	10 April 2014	European Championships	Tel Aviv, Israel	
69 kg
Snatch	99 kg	Mandy Treutlein	10 June 2017		Nagold, Germany	
Clean & Jerk	120 kg	Stephanie Mantek	12 August 2000		Essen, Germany	
Total	213 kg	Mandy Treutlein	5 December 2015		Leimen, Germany	
75 kg
Snatch	101 kg	Yvonne Kranz	19 April 2007	European Championships	Strasbourg, France	
Clean & Jerk	131 kg	Yvonne Kranz	19 April 2007	European Championships	Strasbourg, France	
Total	232 kg	Yvonne Kranz	19 April 2007	European Championships	Strasbourg, France	
90 kg
Snatch	98 kg	Nina Schroth	7 April 2017	European Championships	Split, Croatia	
Clean & Jerk	119 kg	Nina Schroth	7 April 2017	European Championships	Split, Croatia	
Total	217 kg	Nina Schroth	7 April 2017	European Championships	Split, Croatia	
+90 kg
Snatch	112.5 kg	Monique Riesterer	22 September 2000	Olympic Games	Sydney, Australia	
Clean & Jerk	139 kg	Kathleen Schöppe	21 April 2013		Chemnitz, Germany	
Total	247.5 kg	Monique Riesterer	9 September 2000		Lörrach, Germany	
