= Yunder Beytula =

Bulgarian weightlifter (born 1992)

Personal information
- Nationality: Bulgarian
- Born: 9 January 1992 (age 34) Dobrich, Bulgaria
- Weight: 81.00 kg (179 lb)

Sport
- Country: Bulgaria
- Sport: Weightlifting
- Weight class: 81 kg
- Club: SKUT Dobrudzha
- Coached by: Ivan Ivanov; Todor Kirchev

Achievements and titles
- Personal bests: Snatch: 158 kg (2020); Clean & Jerk: 201 kg (2019); Total: 358 kg (2019)
Medal record
World Championships
European Championships

Yunder Nedim Beytula (Bulgarian: Юндер Бейтула; born 9 January 1992) is a Bulgarian male weightlifter.

== Career ==
=== World Championships ===
In 2019 he competed at the 2019 World Weightlifting Championships in the 81 kg category, winning the bronze medal in the clean & jerk portion with 201 kg.

== Major results ==
Year	Venue	Weight	Snatch (kg)				Clean & Jerk (kg)				Total	Rank
Year	Venue	Weight	1	2	3	Rank	1	2	3	Rank	Total	Rank
World Championships
2019	Pattaya, Thailand	81 kg	150	155	157	14	192	198	201	3rd place, bronze medalist(s)	358	5
European Championships
2018	Bucharest, Romania	77 kg	143	~~146~~	~~146~~	7	179	183	~~190~~	4	326	6
2021	Moscow, Russia	81 kg	150	~~153~~	~~153~~	10	185	196	~~198~~	4	346	6
European Junior & U23 Weightlifting Championships
2011	Bucharest, Romania	69 kg	131	~~134~~	~~134~~	8	165	170	~~172~~	2nd place, silver medalist(s)	301	4
2012	Eilat, Israel	69 kg	135	~~139~~	~~140~~	5	163	~~171~~	171	3rd place, bronze medalist(s)	306	4
Qatar International Cup
2019	Doha, Qatar	81 kg	147	151	153	7	188	191	194	4	347	5
International Fajr Cup
2020	Rasht, Iran	81 kg	150	155	158	2nd place, silver medalist(s)	188	191	195	2nd place, silver medalist(s)	353	2nd place, silver medalist(s)
Malta International Open
2020	Valletta, Malta	81 kg	150	155	~~160~~	1st place, gold medalist(s)	190	~~195~~	197	1st place, gold medalist(s)	352	1st place, gold medalist(s)
