= Valentyna Kisil =

Ukrainian weightlifter (born 1998)

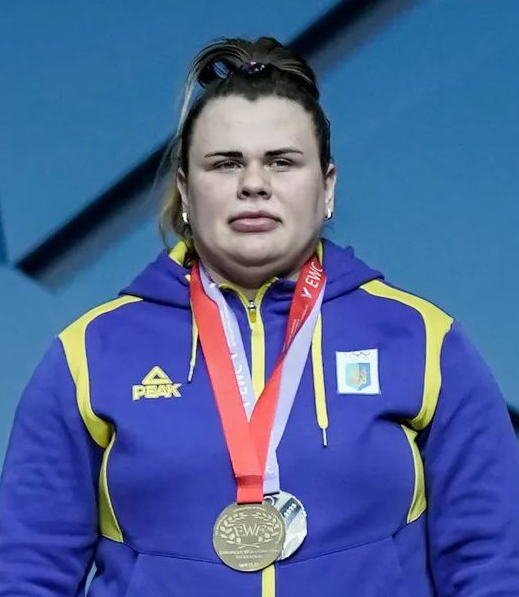

Personal information
- Born: 5 July 1998 (age 27) Chernihiv Oblast, Ukraine

Sport
- Country: Ukraine
- Sport: Weightlifting
- Weight class: +87 kg
Medal record
Women's weightlifting
Representing Ukraine
European Championships
Silver medal – second place	2017 Split	90 kg
Bronze medal – third place	2023 Yerevan	+87 kg
Bronze medal – third place	2025 Chișinău	+87 kg
World Juniors Championships
Bronze medal – third place	2017 Tokyo	90 kg
European Juniors Championships
Silver medal – second place	2016 Eilat	+75 kg
Bronze medal – third place	2013 Tallinn	75 kg

Valentyna Kisil (born 5 July 1998 in Chernihiv Oblast, Ukraine) is a Ukrainian weightlifter. She won silver medal at the 2017 European Championships in Split, Croatia, and bronze medal at the 2023 Europeans in Yerevan, Armenia.

== Major results ==
Year	Venue	Weight	Snatch (kg)				Clean & Jerk (kg)				Total	Rank
Year	Venue	Weight	1	2	3	Rank	1	2	3	Rank	Total	Rank
European Championships
2017	Split, Croatia	90 kg	105	108	110	1st place, gold medalist(s)	124	127	130	2nd place, silver medalist(s)	240	2nd place, silver medalist(s)
2021	Moscow, Russia	87 kg	100	104	~~108~~	5	117	~~122~~	122	11	221	8
2022	Tirana, Albania	87 kg	100	~~103~~	~~103~~	6	113	~~116~~	116	7	216	6
2023	Yerevan, Armenia	+87 kg	105	108	111	2nd place, silver medalist(s)	126	130	133	4	244	3rd place, bronze medalist(s)
2025	Chișinău, Moldova	+87 kg	105	108	110	3rd place, bronze medalist(s)	121	~~127~~	127	4	237	3rd place, bronze medalist(s)
