= Max Lang (weightlifter) =

German weightlifter (born 1992)

Personal information
- Nationality: German
- Born: 6 December 1992 (age 33)
- Height: 166 cm (5 ft 5 in)
- Weight: 72.98 kg (161 lb)

Sport
- Country: Germany
- Sport: Weightlifting
- Event: -73 kg
- Club: Chemnitzer AC

Max Richard Lang (born 6 December 1992) is a German male weightlifter currently competing in the men's 73 kg category. He currently holds the German national records for Clean and Jerk as well as the Total in the same weight category.

== Career ==
Max initially had no prior experience in the sport. Before discovering weightlifting, Lang was actively involved in soccer and attended a specialized sports school in Germany. However, due to a series of injuries, he was forced to leave the soccer club he was part of. In an effort to continue his education at his sports school, Lang transitioned into the sport of weightlifting.

His first recorded appearance at a competition was at the 6th European Youth Championships in 2008, competing in the 50 kg class. He finished tenth in the snatch, and fifth in the clean and jerk, resulting in a seventh-place finish.

== Major results ==
Year	Venue	Weight	Snatch (kg)				Clean & Jerk (kg)				Total	Rank
Year	Venue	Weight	1	2	3	Rank	1	2	3	Rank	Total	Rank
Representing Germany
World Championships
2014	Almaty, Kazakhstan	77 kg	145	~~150~~	150	11	180	~~185~~	~~185~~	17	330	14
2015	Houston, United States	77 kg	147	~~150~~	150	20	180	186	189	9	339	11
2017	Anaheim, United States	77 kg	145	149	~~151~~	12	178	183	185	11	334	11
2018	Ashgabat, Turkmenistan	81 kg	150	154	~~154~~	14	180	185	~~190~~	14	339	12
2019	Pattaya, Thailand	73 kg	143	~~147~~	147	12	175	~~180~~	180	15	327	14
2022	Bogotá, Colombia	73 kg	140	143	146	12	175	180	~~185~~	10	326	11
2023	Riyadh, Saudi Arabia	73 kg	—	—	—	—	~~176~~	176	—	12	—	—
European Championships
2016	Førde, Norway	77 kg	~~147~~	~~147~~	150	10	180	186	~~191~~	17	330	14
2017	Split, Croatia	77 kg	150	154	156	5	178	184	188	4	344	5
2019	(Georgia (country)) Batumi, Georgia	81 kg	145	149	~~151~~	12	180	~~186~~	187	8	336	9
2021	Moscow, Russia	73 kg	~~145~~	~~145~~	145	9	175	180	185	1st place, gold medalist(s)	330	6
2022	Tirana, Albania	73 kg	~~143~~	143	~~146~~	8	175	~~180~~	~~180~~	4	318	5
2023	Yerevan, Armenia	73 kg	143	~~146~~	~~146~~	10	175	180	185	3rd place, bronze medalist(s)	328	6
European Junior & U23 Championships
2011	Bucharest, Romania	69 kg	118	122	125	12	155	~~160~~	~~161~~	9	280	9
2012	Eilat, Israel	69 kg	127	131	~~133~~	6	165	~~169~~	~~169~~	5	296	6
2014	Limassol, Cyprus	77 kg	145	150	152	1st place, gold medalist(s)	178	182	185	2nd place, silver medalist(s)	337	2nd place, silver medalist(s)
