= Mehtap Kurnaz =

Turkish weightlifter (born 1995)

Personal information
- Nationality: Turkish
- Born: May 1, 1995 (age 30)
- Height: 1.6 m (5 ft 3 in)
- Weight: 62 kg (137 lb)

Sport
- Country: Turkey
- Sport: Weightlifting
- Event: 63 kg

Mehtap Kurnaz (born May 1, 1995) is a Turkish weightlifter competing in the 63 kg division.

Kurnaz took part at the 2014 World Weightlifting Championships in Almaty, Kazakhstan without having success. She won the bronze medal in the clean and jerk event lifting 108 kg in the women's 63 kg division at the 2014 European Junior and Under-23 Weightlifting Championships held in Cyprus. In the snatch event, she ranked fifth by lifting 88 kg. In the total, she missed the bronze medal by 1 kg with her result of 196 kg.

In 2015, she won three gold medals at the 3rd Weightlifting Championship of Islamic Solidarity Sports Federation in Antalya, Turkey by lifting 83 kg in the snatch, 100 kg in the clean&jerk event and so 183 kg in total. She participated at the 2015 European Weightlifting Championships in Tbilisi, Georgia ranking fifth.

Kurnaz attended the Olympic Preparation Center (TOHM) in Konya. She earned a quota spot for the 2016 Summer Olympics.
