= Adam Maligov =

Russian weightlifter (born 1993)

Personal information
- Nationality: Russia
- Born: 6 May 1993 (age 33)
- Height: 1.74 m (5 ft 9 in)
- Weight: 92.75 kg (204.5 lb)

Sport
- Country: Russia
- Sport: Weightlifting
- Event: –94 kg
Medal record
European Championships
Disqualified	2017 Split	–94 kg
Disqualified	2014 Tel Aviv	–85 kg

Adam Maligov (Russian: адам малигов, born 6 May 1993) is a Russian weightlifter, and European Champion competing in the 94 kg category.

== Career ==
In 2014 he was the silver medalist in the 85 kg category. In 2017 he became European Champion in the 94 kg category, by virtue of completing his 208 kg Clean and Jerk, giving him the winning total of 388 kg before Dmytro Chumak lifted his final Clean and Jerk of 214 kg, giving Chumak 388 kg as well.

== Major results ==
Year	Venue	Weight	Snatch (kg)				Clean & Jerk (kg)				Total	Rank
Year	Venue	Weight	1	2	3	Rank	1	2	3	Rank	Total	Rank
European Championships
2014	Tel Aviv, Israel	85 kg	162	168	171	2nd place, silver medalist(s)	195	~~201~~	202	3rd place, bronze medalist(s)	373	DQ
2017	Split, Croatia	94 kg	172	176	180	2nd place, silver medalist(s)	208	~~215~~	-	3rd place, bronze medalist(s)	388	DQ
