= Iurie Bulat =

Moldovan weightlifter (born 1994)

Personal information
- Born: October 6, 1994 (age 31)
- Weight: 85 kg (187 lb)

Sport
- Country: Moldova
- Sport: Weightlifting
- Event: 85 kg

Iurie Bulat (born 6 October 1994) is a Moldovan weightlifter who has competed internationally in the men's 85 kg category at junior and senior levels.

== Major results ==
Year	Competition	Location	Category	Snatch	Clean & Jerk	Total	Rank / Notes
2014	World Junior Championships	Kazan, Russia	85 kg	157 kg	172 kg	329 kg	2nd in Snatch, 4th overall.
2014	European Junior & U23 Championships	Limassol, Cyprus	85 kg	162 kg	189 kg	351 kg	1st overall.
2015	European Weightlifting Championships	Tbilisi, Georgia	85 kg	172 kg	185 kg	357 kg	1st place in Snatch(172 kg), 4th overall.
2015	World Weightlifting Championships	Houston, United States	85 kg	165 kg	185 kg	350 kg	DSQ;
