= Aliaksandr Makaranka =

Belarusian weightlifter

Aliaksandr Makaranka (born 2 February 1990 in Orsha) is a Belarusian weightlifter. He competed for Belarus at the 2012 Summer Olympics, in the men's 94 kg division (middle heavyweight), finishing in fourth place with a snatch of 175 kg and a clean and jerk of 209 kg.
