= Marco Spanehl =

German weightlifter

Personal information
- Nationality: German
- Born: 3 December 1967 (age 57); Schwerin, Germany

Sport
- Sport: Weightlifting

Marco Spanehl (born 3 December 1967) is a German weightlifter. He competed in the men's featherweight event at the 1992 Summer Olympics.
