= Cristina Iovu =

Moldovan–born Azerbaijani-Romanian weightlifter

Personal information
- Nationality: Moldovan
- Born: 8 November 1992 (age 33) Chișinău
- Height: 1.55 m (5 ft 1 in)
- Weight: 53 kg (117 lb)

Sport
- Country: Moldova
- Sport: Weightlifting
- Event(s): –53 kg; 53 kg
- Coached by: Serghei Cretu

Achievements and titles
- National finals: Moldova, Romania
Medal record
Representing Romania
World Championships
Disqualified	2018 Ashgabat	–55 kg
European Championships
Gold medal – first place	2016 Førde	–53 kg
Representing Azerbaijan
World Championships
Disqualified	2013 Wrocław	–53 kg
Summer Universiade
Silver medal – second place	2013 Kazan	–53 kg
Representing Moldova
Olympic Games
Disqualified	2012 London	–53 kg
European Championships
Gold medal – first place	2012 Antalya	–53 kg

Cristina Iovu (born 8 November 1992) is a Moldovan–born Azerbaijani-Romanian weightlifter competing in the –53 kg division. She is banned by the International Weightlifting Federation (IWF) until 2026 for blood substitution.

== Career ==
Iovu won gold at the 2012 European Weightlifting Championships. At the 2012 London Olympics, Iovu originally won the bronze medal in the 53 kg event.

Iovu was disqualified from the 2013 World Weightlifting Championships after testing positive for Oxandrolone and was banned from competing by the IWF for two years, from 19 June 2013 to 19 June 2015. The Azerbaijani team was forced to pay $500,000 to the International Weightlifting Federation as multiple tests were positive for prohibited substances from the world anti-doping agency list.

In the 2016 European Championships Iovu represented the third country in her career - Romania.

On 27 July 2016 the International Weightlifting Federation announced that Iovu failed her re-tested 2012 Olympics sample. She tested positive for Dehydrochlormethyltestosterone (S1.1 Anabolic agents). In November 2016, she was stripped of her 2012 Olympic medal. She is facing another suspension and did not take part in the 2016 Rio Olympics.

On 2 November 2018, on the 2018 World Weightlifting Championships she got in Snatch 94-97-n/a and in Clean & Jerk, 116-118-123 got the bronze medal.

On 15 December 2018 she was banned until 2026 by the International Weightlifting Federation for Blood substitution.
