= Aliaksandr Bersanau =

Belarusian Olympic weightlifter

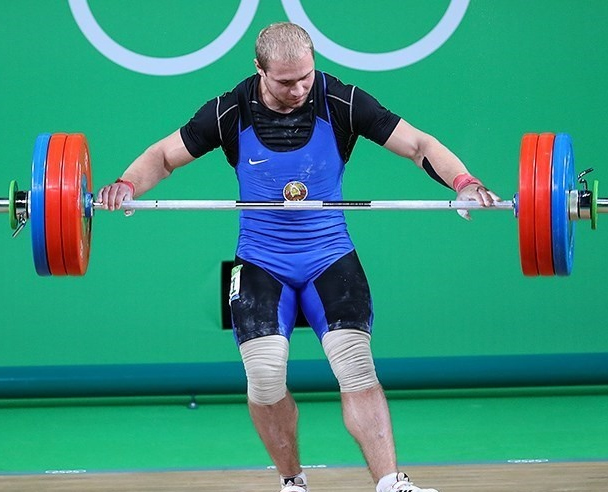
- Bersanau at the 2016 Olympics

Personal information
- Nationality: Belarusian
- Born: 1 September 1992 (age 33)
- Education: Vitebsk State University
- Height: 176 cm (5 ft 9 in)
- Weight: 94 kg (207 lb)

Sport
- Country: Belarus
- Sport: Weightlifting
- Club: Trade Unions Federation Sports Club
- Coached by: Anatoly Suvorin; Viktor Shershukov (2010–)

Aliaksandr Bersanau (Belarusian: Аляксандр Бярсанаў; Łacinka: Aliaksandr Biarsanaŭ; born 1 September 1992) is a Belarusian Olympic weightlifter. He competed at the 2016 Summer Olympics and placed eighth in the 94 kg weight division.

== Results ==
Year	Event	Weight	Snatch (kg)	Clean & Jerk (kg)	Total (kg)	Rank
2010	European Junior Championships	77 kg	137	179	316	5
2011	European Junior Championships	85 kg	153	191	344	3
2012	European Junior Championships	94 kg	169	196	365	4
2014	World Championships	94 kg	170	205	375	11
2015	European Championships	94 kg	174	195	369	5
2015	World Championships	105 kg	178	215	393	10
