= Artiom Pipa =

Moldovan weightlifter

Personal information
- Born: 19 July 1992 (age 32)
- Weight: 75.80 kg (167.1 lb)

Sport
- Country: Moldova
- Sport: Weightlifting
- Team: National team
- Updated on 1 September 2016

Artiom Pipa (born 19 July 1992) is a Moldovan male weightlifter, competing in the 77 kg category and representing Moldova at international competitions. He competed at world championships, including at the 2015 World Weightlifting Championships. He also competed as a junior for Moldova at world championships, winning the bronze medal at the 2010 U-20 edition, and also 3 bronze medals at the 2009 world championships in Chiangmai (Thailand). In 2008 he became junior European Champion in Durrës (Albania).

In 2015 the International Weightlifting Federation (IWF) has suspended Pipa for anti-doping rule violation, after he returned a positive sample for anabolic agents.

== Major results ==
Year	Venue	Weight	Snatch (kg)				Clean & Jerk (kg)				Total	Rank
Year	Venue	Weight	1	2	3	Rank	1	2	3	Rank	Total	Rank
World Championships
2015	Houston, United States	77 kg	150	155	~~158~~	DSQ	~~185~~	185	~~189~~	DSQ	0	DSQ
2014	Almaty, Kazakhstan	77 kg	147	151	~~154~~	10	181	186	~~191~~	7	337	7
2011	Paris, France	69 kg	~~131~~	131	~~135~~	36	---	---	---	---	0	---
