= Gheorghe Cernei =

Moldovan-born Romanian weightlifter

Personal information
- Born: 13 April 1990 (age 36)
- Weight: 84.14 kg (185.5 lb)

Sport
- Country: Romania
- Sport: Weightlifting
- Team: National team
Medal record
Men's weightlifting
Representing Romania
European Championships
Bronze medal – third place	2016 Førde	–85 kg
- Updated on 1 September 2016

Gheorghe Cernei (born 13 April 1990) is a Moldovan-born Romanian male weightlifter, competing in the 85 kg category and representing Romania at international competitions.

== Career ==
He competed at world championships, including at the 2015 World Weightlifting Championships. He won the bronze medal at the 2016 European Weightlifting Championships. Previously he represented Moldova in youth international competitions. In late 2013 he was suspended by the International Weightlifting Federation (IWF) in view of an anti-doping rule violation.

== Major results ==
Year	Venue	Weight	Snatch (kg)				Clean & Jerk (kg)				Total	Rank
Year	Venue	Weight	1	2	3	Rank	1	2	3	Rank	Total	Rank
World Championships
2015	Houston, United States	85 kg	162	~~166~~	~~166~~	10	190	~~196~~	---	13	352	12
European Weightlifting Championships
2012	Antalya, Turkey	85 kg	158	~~163~~	~~165~~	7	190	~~195~~	~~197~~	5	348	8
2016	Førde, Norway	85 kg	161	165	~~167~~	4	193	~~197~~	~~198~~	5	358	3rd place, bronze medalist(s)
2025	Chișinău, Moldova	81 kg	148	152	~~157~~	6	~~172~~	~~172~~	~~173~~	—	—	
2026	Batumi, Georgia	71 kg	~~137~~	~~137~~	~~137~~	—	—	—	—	—	—	—
