= Firidun Guliyev =

Azerbaijani weightlifter

Medal record

Men's weightlifting

Representing Azerbaijan

World Championships
Disqualified	2013 Wrocław	– 69 kg

Summer Universiade
Disqualified	2013 Kazan	– 69 kg

Firidun Guliyev (Azerbaijani: Firidun Quliyev; born 25 June 1994) is an Azerbaijani weightlifter.

At the 2011 European Junior Championships Guliyev won the bronze medal in the 69 kg category, lifting 303 kg in total. and a gold medal at the 2012 European Junior Championships.

At the 2013 Junior World Championships he won the bronze medal in the 69 kg category, lifting 308 kg in total.

Guliyev won a gold medal in the 2013 Summer Universiade and a bronze medal at the 2013 World Weightlifting Championships. but later lost both medals and was banned from international competition by the International Weightlifting Federation for 2 years for use of anabolic steroids.

He held a youth world record with a Clean & Jerk of 173 kg in the 69 kg division, but Clarence Cummings Jr. relinquished the record at the 2016 Junior World Championships with a Clean and Jerk of 180 kg.
