= Darya Pachabut =

Belarusian weightlifter (born 1994)

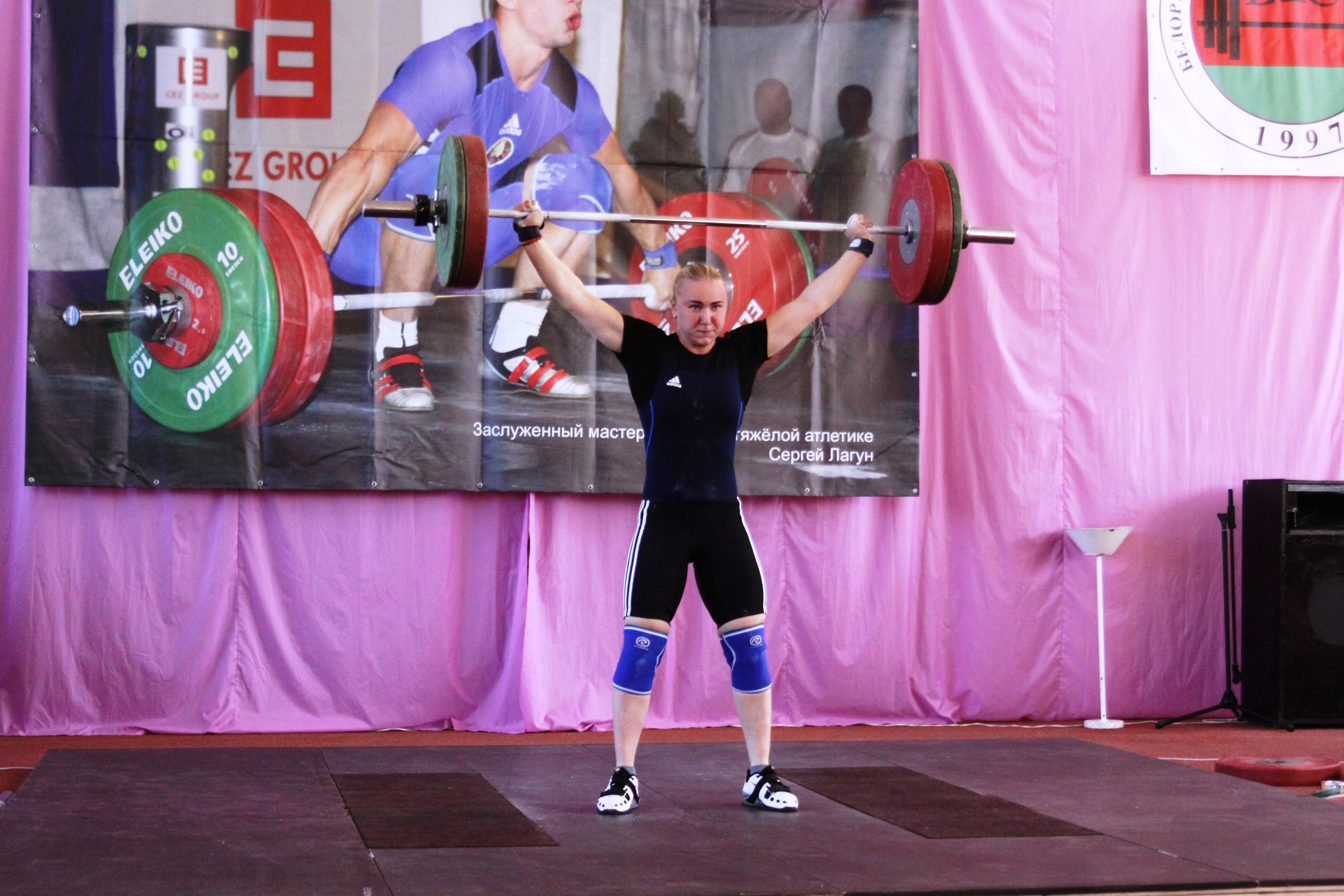
- Darya Pachabut lifting weight

Personal information
- Nationality: Belarusians
- Born: 31 December 1994 (age 31)
- Height: 5 ft 4 in (163 cm)
- Weight: 67 kg (148 lb)

Sport
- Country: Belarus
- Sport: Weightlifting
- Weight class: 69 kg
Medal record
Women's Weightlifting
Representing Belarus
European Championships
Silver medal – second place	2016 Førde	–69 kg
Bronze medal – third place	2015 Tbilisi	–75 kg
European Junior Weightlifting Championships
Disqualified	2012 Eilat	–63 kg
Silver medal – second place	2011 Bucharest	–63 kg
- Updated on 11 August 2016

Darya Pachabut (born 31 December 1994) is a Belarusian weightlifter.

== Career ==
Pachabut won the silver medal at the 2011 European Junior Weightlifting Championships in the –63 kg category. The following year, Pachabut finished first but she was later disqualified after returning a positive doping test for Stanozolol. As a result of the doping violation, Pachabut was suspended for 2 years by the International Weightlifting Federation.

After returning to competition following her suspension, Pachabut won the bronze medal at the 2015 European Weightlifting Championships in the –75 kg category, and then the silver medal at the 2016 European Weightlifting Championships in the –69 kg category. Pachabut competed at the 2016 Summer Olympics in the –69 kg event, where she finished 6th.
