= Kristina Sobol =

Russian weightlifter (born 1991)

Personal information
- Full name: Kristina Ivanovna Sobol
- Nationality: (Russia) Russian
- Born: 30 November 1991 (age 34) Salsk, Rostov Oblast, RSFSR, USSR (now Russia)
- Weight: 48.80 kg (107.6 lb)

Sport
- Country: Russia
- Sport: Weightlifting
- Event: –49 kg
Medal record
European Championships
Silver medal – second place	2019 Batumi	–49 kg
Silver medal – second place	2021 Moscow	–49 kg

Kristina Ivanovna Sobol (Russian: Кристина Ивановна Соболь; born 30 November 1991) is a Russian weightlifter, formerly competing in the 53 kg and now competing in the 49 kg category.

In 2021, she competed in the women's 49 kg event at the 2020 Summer Olympics in Tokyo, Japan where she did not rank after failing to register a successful result in the Snatch event.

== Major results ==
Year	Venue	Weight	Snatch (kg)				Clean & Jerk (kg)				Total	Rank
Year	Venue	Weight	1	2	3	Rank	1	2	3	Rank	Total	Rank
Olympic Games
2021	Tokyo, Japan	49 kg	~~80~~	~~80~~	~~81~~		—	—	—		—	—
European Championships
2019	(Georgia (country)) Batumi, Georgia	49 kg				2nd place, silver medalist(s)				2nd place, silver medalist(s)	180	2nd place, silver medalist(s)
2021	Moscow, Russia	49 kg	83	85	~~87~~	2nd place, silver medalist(s)	~~93~~	93	96	2nd place, silver medalist(s)	181	2nd place, silver medalist(s)
