= Tatiana Aleeva =

Russian weightlifter (born 1991)

Personal information
- Born: 1 March 1991 (age 35)

Sport
- Country: Russia
- Sport: Weightlifting
Medal record
Women's weightlifting
Representing Russia
European Championships
Silver medal – second place	2017 Split	63 kg
Silver medal – second place	2019 Batumi	59 kg

Tatiana Aleeva (born 1 March 1991) is a Russian weightlifter. She is a two-time silver medalist at the European Weightlifting Championships, both in 2017 and in 2019.

In 2018, she competed in the women's 64 kg event at the World Weightlifting Championships held in Ashgabat, Turkmenistan.

She was provisionally suspended in August 2020 after testing positive for a banned substance.
