= Iurie Dudoglo =

Moldovan weightlifter (born 1991)

Personal information
- Nationality: Moldovan
- Born: 9 July 1991 (age 34)

Sport
- Country: Moldova
- Sport: Weightlifting
- Team: National team
Medal record
European Championships
Disqualified	2017 Split	–56 kg
- Updated on 31 August 2016

Iurie Dudoglo (born 9 July 1991) is a Moldovan male weightlifter, competing in the 56/62 kg category and representing Moldova at international competitions. He competed at world championships, including at the 2010, 2011, and 2015 World Weightlifting Championships. He also competed for Moldova at 2010, 2016, and 2017 European Weightlifting Championships. In 2018 he was issued a ban until 2025 by the International Weightlifting Federation after testing positive for Clenbuterol.

== Major results ==
Year	Venue	Weight	Snatch (kg)				Clean & Jerk (kg)				Total	Rank
Year	Venue	Weight	1	2	3	Rank	1	2	3	Rank	Total	Rank
World Championships
2015	Houston, United States	62 kg	123	~~126~~	126	16	152	157	~~160~~	14	283	16
2011	Paris, France	62 kg	~~123~~	123	~~126~~	16	~~150~~	~~150~~	150	21	273	19
2010	Antalya, Turkey	62 kg	117	121	~~125~~	17	140	145	~~148~~	17	266	16
European Championships
2017	Split, Croatia	56 kg	~~114~~	115	~~118~~	—	135	146	~~152~~	—	—	—
