= European Junior and U23 Weightlifting Championships =

International youth weightlifting competition

- Status: Active
- Genre: Sports Event
- Date: Usually April
- Frequency: Annual
- Location: Various
- Inaugurated: 1973
- Organiser: EWF

European Junior and U23 Weightlifting Championships (European U23 and U20 Weightlifting Championships) is an annual event organised by the European Weightlifting Federation (EWF) for Under 23 and under 20 Weightlifters in Europe. European Championships in junior category were held from 1973 under the name European Junior Weightlifting Championships (U20). In 2009 the competitions were held in two cities, European Junior Weightlifting Championships in Landskrona and the new European U23 Weightlifting Championships in Wladyslawowo. After that year, the competition took the current name.

European Weightlifting Federation (EWF) also have European U17 and U15 Weightlifting Championships (European Youth & U15 Weightlifting Championships) since 1992. last edition was competed in 2022 European Youth & U15 Weightlifting Championships.

== Editions ==
Results:

MJ	WJ	M23	W23	Year	Host city	Host country	Events	Results
European Junior Weightlifting Championships
1	-	-	-	1973			27	
2	-	-	-	1974			27	
3	-	-	-	1975	Marseille	France	27	
4	-	-	-	1976	Gdańsk	Poland	27	
5	-	-	-	1977	Sofia	Bulgaria	30	
6	-	-	-	1978	Athens	Greece	30	
7	-	-	-	1979	Debrecen	Hungary	30	
8	-	-	-	1980			30	
9	-	-	-	1981			30	
10	-	-	-	1982			30	
11	-	-	-	1983			30	
12	-	-	-	1984	Lignano	Italy	30	
13	-	-	-	1985	Edinburgh	United Kingdom	30	
14	-	-	-	1986	Donaueschingen	Germany	30	
15	-	-	-	1987	Belgrade	Yugoslavia	30	
16	-	-	-	1988	Athens	Greece	30	
17	-	-	-	1989	Sarajevo	Yugoslavia	30	
18	-	-	-	1990	Valletta	Malta	30	
19	-	-	-	1991	Varna	Bulgaria	30	
20	-	-	-	1992	Cardiff	United Kingdom	30	
21	-	-	-	1993	Valencia	Spain	30	
22	-	-	-	1994	Rome	Italy	30	
23	-	-	-	1995	Beersheba	Israel	30	
24	-	-	-	1996	Prague	Czech Republic	30	
25	-	-	-	1997	Seville	Spain	30	
26	1	-	-	1998	Sofia	Bulgaria	45	
27	2	-	-	1999	Spała	Poland	45	
28	3	-	-	2000	Rijeka	Croatia	45	
29	4	-	-	2001	Kalmar	Sweden	45	
30	5	-	-	2002	Nuoro	Italy	45	
31	6	-	-	2003	Valencia	Spain	45	
32	7	-	-	2004	Burgas	Bulgaria	45	
33	8	-	-	2005	Trenčín	Slovakia	45	
34	9	-	-	2006	Palermo	Italy	45	
35	10	-	-	2007	Puerto de la Cruz	Spain	45	
36	11	-	-	2008	Durrës	Albania	45	
European Junior Weightlifting Championships / European U23 Weightlifting Championships
37	12	-	-	2009	Landskrona	Sweden	45	
-	-	1	1	2009	Władysławowo	Poland	45	
European Junior and U23 Weightlifting Championships
38	13	2	2	2010	Limassol	Cyprus	90	
39	14	3	3	2011	Bucharest	Romania	90	
40	15	4	4	2012	Eilat	Israel	90	
41	16	5	5	2013	Tallinn	Estonia	90	
42	17	6	6	2014	Limassol	Cyprus	90	
43	18	7	7	2015	Klaipėda	Lithuania	90	
44	19	8	8	2016	Eilat	Israel	90	
45	20	9	9	2017	Durrës	Albania	96	
46	21	10	10	2018	Zamość	Poland	96	
47	22	11	11	2019	Bucharest	Romania	120	
48	23	12	12	2021	Rovaniemi	Finland	120	
49	24	13	13	2022	Durrës	Albania	120	
50	25	14	14	2023	Bucharest	Romania	120	
51	26	15	15	2024	Raszyn	Poland	120	
52	27	16	16	2025	Durrës	Albania	96	
53	28	17	17	2026	Durrës	Albania		

== Championships (Youth & Cadet) ==
- Main Article : European Youth & Cadet Weightlifting Championships (U15 & U17 European Weightlifting Championships)

=== Youth (Youth17/Youth16) ===
No M	No W	Edition	Host Country (City)	Events
Youth 16
1	-	1992	France (Reims)	30
2	-	1993	Hungary (Debrecen)	24
3	1	1994	Yugoslavia (Ljubljana)	45
4	2	1995	Greece (Kavala)	48
5	3	1996	Bulgaria (Burgas)	48
6	4	1997	Hungary (Tatabanya)	48
7	5	1998	Spain (Coruna)	48
8	6	1999	Italy (Lignano)	48
9	7	2000	Slovakia (Kosice)	48
10	8	2001	Austria (Klosterneuburg)	45
11	9	2002	France (Villeneuve-le-Roi)	45
Youth 17
1	1	2003	Germany (Dortmund)	45
2	2	2004	Norway (Stavanger)	45
3	3	2005	Bulgaria (Sofia)	45
4	4	2006	Sweden (Landskrona)	45
5	5	2007	Italy (Pavia)	45
6	6	2008	France (Amiens)	45
7	7	2009	Israel (Eilat)	45
8	8	2010	Spain (Valencia)	45
9	9	2011	Romania (Bucharest)	45
10	10	2012	Romania (Bucharest)	45
11	11	2013	Lithuania (Klaipeda)	45
12	12	2014	Poland (Ciechanow)	45
13	13	2015	Sweden (Landskrona)	45
14	14	2016	Poland (Nowy Tomyśl)	45
15	15	2017	Kosovo (Prishtina)	48

=== Cadet (Youth15) ===
No M	No W	Edition	Host Country (City)	Events
1	1	2013	Lithuania (Klaipeda)	45
2	2	2015	Sweden (Landskrona)	45
3	3	2016	Poland (Nowy Tomyśl)	45
4	4	2017	Kosovo (Prishtina)	48

== Medals (2015–2025) ==
https://intersportstats.com/competition_types/526

https://intersportstats.com/competition_types/549

=== Big ===
Rank	Nation	Gold	Silver	Bronze	Total
1	Armenia	62	35	28	125
2	Turkey	41	48	38	127
3	Russia	38	46	31	115
4	Ukraine	37	44	42	123
5	Georgia	30	35	24	89
6	Italy	29	12	15	56
7	Romania	25	24	20	69
8	Belarus	13	15	13	41
9	Moldova	10	5	9	24
10	Poland	8	15	30	53
11	Bulgaria	8	9	10	27
12	Latvia	8	6	2	16
13	Spain	6	13	10	29
14	Germany	6	8	18	32
15	Azerbaijan	6	5	7	18
16	Great Britain	4	5	9	18
17	Individual Neutral Athletes	3	6	3	12
18	Netherlands	3	1	0	4
19	Austria	2	5	2	9
20	Slovakia	2	2	5	9
21	Belgium	2	1	2	5
22	Hungary	2	1	1	4
22	Lithuania	2	1	1	4
24	Iceland	2	0	3	5
25	Serbia	1	3	3	7
26	Finland	1	3	1	5
27	Albania	1	2	4	7
28	Greece	1	1	3	5
29	Norway	1	1	2	4
30	Israel	1	0	2	3
31	Malta	1	0	1	2
32	France	0	3	6	9
33	Sweden	0	1	4	5
34	Czech Republic	0	1	3	4
35	Denmark	0	1	2	3
Totals (35 entries)		356	358	354	1,068

=== Big and Small ===
Rank	Nation	Gold	Silver	Bronze	Total
1	Armenia	177	114	90	381
2	Turkey	125	248	107	480
3	Ukraine	121	114	124	359
4	Russia	109	128	91	328
5	Italy	87	37	45	169
6	Georgia	86	101	74	261
7	Romania	72	69	68	209
8	Belarus	37	48	35	120
9	Moldova	29	16	31	76
10	Poland	24	56	89	169
11	Spain	22	33	35	90
12	Bulgaria	22	29	32	83
13	Latvia	22	15	9	46
14	Azerbaijan	19	19	17	55
15	Germany	17	26	46	89
16	Great Britain	12	17	23	52
17	Individual Neutral Athletes	9	14	12	35
18	Netherlands	9	2	1	12
19	Austria	8	14	7	29
20	Hungary	7	6	6	19
21	Slovakia	6	9	15	30
22	Belgium	6	3	6	15
23	Iceland	6	1	8	15
24	Albania	5	4	8	17
25	Serbia	4	7	15	26
26	Finland	4	7	5	16
27	Lithuania	4	4	6	14
28	Israel	4	1	5	10
29	France	3	11	13	27
30	Greece	3	5	9	17
31	Norway	3	3	4	10
32	Malta	3	1	1	5
33	Czech Republic	1	2	7	10
34	Sweden	0	2	13	15
35	Denmark	0	2	5	7
36	Ireland	0	0	1	1
Totals (36 entries)		1,066	1,168	1,063	3,297
