= Patrycja Piechowiak =

Polish weightlifter (born 1992)

Personal information
- Born: 1 September 1992 (age 33) Grodzisk Wielkopolski, Poland
- Height: 1.62 m (5 ft 4 in)
- Weight: 68 kg (150 lb)

Sport
- Country: Poland
- Sport: Weightlifting
- Event: Women's 69 kg
Medal record
European Championships
Bronze medal – third place	2018 Bucharest	–69 kg

Patrycja Piechowiak (born 1 September 1992) is a Polish weightlifter. She competed in the women's 69 kg event at the 2016 Summer Olympics.
