= Nina Schroth =

German weightlifter (born 1991)

Personal information
- Born: 16 August 1991 (age 34)

Sport
- Country: Germany
- Sport: Weightlifting
- Weight class: 81 kg
Medal record
Women's weightlifting
Representing Germany
European Championships
Gold medal – first place	2019 Batumi	81 kg

Nina Schroth (born 16 August 1991) is a German weightlifter. She is a gold medalist at the European Weightlifting Championships.

== Sports career ==
At the 2019 European Weightlifting Championships held in Batumi, Georgia, she won the silver medal in the women's 81 kg event. This became the gold medal after disqualification of the original gold medalist Eleni Konstantinidi of Greece.
