= Stanislau Chadovich =

Belarusian weightlifter (born 1992)

Medal record

Men's weightlifting

Representing Belarus

European Championships
Silver medal – second place	2014 Tel Aviv	62 kg

Stanislav Chadovich (born 24 August 1992 in Mahilyow) is a male weightlifter representing Belarus.

== Career ==
Chadovich won a silver at the 2014 European Weightlifting Championships for the 62kg event. In 2016, he testing positive for urine manipulation and subsequently suspended after the adverse analytical finding.
