= Antonis Martasidis =

Greek/Cypriot weightlifter (born 1992)

Personal information
- Full name: Antonis Martasidis
- Born: 14 June 1992 (age 34) Kavala
- Height: 1.78 m (5 ft 10 in)
- Weight: 81.00 kg (179 lb)

Sport
- Country: Greece; Cyprus
- Sport: Weightlifting
Medal record
Men's weightlifting
Representing Cyprus
Commonwealth Championships
Silver medal – second place	2021 Tashkent	96 kg
- Updated on 2 January 2022

Antonis Martasidis (Greek: Αντώνης Μαρταςιδις; born June 14, 1992) is a Greek/Cypriot male weightlifter, competing in the 85 kg category. European Weightlifting Championships in April 2019

== Major results ==
Year	Venue	Weight	Snatch (kg)				Clean & Jerk (kg)				Total	Rank
Year	Venue	Weight	1	2	3	Rank	1	2	3	Rank	Total	Rank
World Championships
2014	Houston, United States	85 kg	155	~~160~~	~~160~~	20	195	200	---	8	355	11
2011	Paris, France	77 kg	140	~~145~~	~~145~~	27	~~177~~	~~177~~	177	21	317	22
