= Cameroon at the 2026 Commonwealth Games =

- Flag of Cameroon
- CG code: CMR
- CGA: Cameroon Olympic and Sports Committee
- Website: cnosc.org (in French)

in Glasgow, Scotland 23 July 2026 – 2 August 2026
- Competitors: 20 in 3 sports
- Flag bearer: Nora Monie
- Baton bearer: Junior Ngadja Nyabeyeu
- Medals Ranked 16th: Gold 1 Silver 1 Bronze 3 Total 5

Commonwealth Games appearances (overview)
- 1998; 2002; 2006; 2010; 2014; 2018; 2022; 2026; 2030

Cameroon competed at the 2026 Commonwealth Games in Glasgow, Scotland. This marked Cameroon's eighth participation at the games, after making its debut at the 1998 Commonwealth Games.

The King's Baton relay stopped in Cameroon in July 2025. The Cameroon team originally consisted of 24 athletes competing in four sports. However the boxing team withdrew from the games due to internal issues with the Cameroon Boxing Federation. This meant the team size was reduced to 20 athletes.

Athlete Nora Monie was the country's flagbearer during the opening ceremony. Meanwhile, weightlifter Junior Ngadja Nyabeyeu was the baton bearer during the opening ceremony.

Emmanuel Eseme won the country's first medal, a gold in the men's 100 metres sprint, breaking the Games record and national record in the process. Overall the Cameroonian team won five medals, one gold, one silver and three bronze. This ranked the country 16th on the medal table.

== Competitors ==
The following is the list of number of competitors participating at the Games per sport/discipline.

Sport		Men	Women	Total
Athletics	Athletics	5	4	9
Athletics	Para athletics	1	0	1
Judo		2	3	5
Weightlifting	Para powerlifting	1	2	3
Weightlifting	Weightlifting	2	0	2
Total		11	9	20

== Medallists ==
The following Cameroonian competitors won medals at the games. In the by discipline sections below, medallists' names are bolded.

Medal	Name	Sport	Event	Date	Ref.
Gold	Emmanuel Eseme	Athletics	Men's 100 metres	28 July	
Silver	Richelle Soppi Mbella	Judo	Women's +78 kg	2 August	
Bronze	Marie-Céline Baba Matia	Judo	Women's 52 kg	31 July	
Bronze	Cedric Lekezo Azamdzi	Athletics (para)	Men's shot put (F57)	1 August	
Bronze	Franck Tahman Zan	Judo	Men's 100 kg	2 August	

== Athletics ==
Cameroon entered ten athletes (six men and four women), includingn one male para athlete.

Key

Ranks given for track events are within the athlete's heat only.

- **Q** = Qualified for the next round
- **q** = Qualified for the next round as a fastest loser or, in field events, by position without achieving the qualifying target

Track events

Athlete	Event	Heat		Semifinal		Final	
Athlete	Event	Result	Rank	Result	Rank	Result	Rank
**Emmanuel Eseme**	Men's 100 m	bye		9.89	1 **Q**	9.83	1st place, gold medalist(s)
Claude Itoungue Bongogne	Men's 100 m	Did not start					
Emmanuel Eseme	Men's 200 m	20.73	3 **q**	20.32	3	Did not advance	
Claude Itoungue Bongogne	Men's 200 m	Did not start					
Linda Angounou	Women's 400 m hurdles	DQ		—N/a		Did not advance	

Field events

Athlete	Event	Qualification		Final	
Athlete	Event	Distance	Rank	Distance	Rank
Raymond Nkwemy Tchomfa	Men's long jump	7.57	13	Did not advance	
Appolinaire Yinra	Men's long jump	7.27	15	Did not advance	
Derick Gama	Men's triple jump	15.52	10 **q**	15.69	9
Raymond Nkwemy Tchomfa	Men's triple jump	16.06	6 **q**	15.97	8
Lucien Wangba	Men's discus throw	—N/a		NM	
Nora Monie	Women's discus throw	—N/a		56.81	5

Combined events – Heptathlon

Athlete	Event	100H	HJ	SP	200 m	LJ	JT	800 m	Final	Rank
Adèle Mafogang	Result	14.80	1.70	10.58	26.51	5.88	33.81	2:17.54	5262	14
Adèle Mafogang	Points	868	855	567	753	813	549	857	5262	14

=== Para athletics ===
Athlete	Event	Final	
Athlete	Event	Distance	Rank
**Cédric Lekezo Azamdzi**	Men's shot put F57	12.57	3rd place, bronze medalist(s)

== Judo ==
Cameroon entered five judoka (two men and three women).

Athlete	Event	Round of 16	Quarterfinals	Semifinals	Repechage	Final/BM	
Athlete	Event	Opposition Result	Opposition Result	Opposition Result	Opposition Result	Opposition Result	Rank
Vladimir Ngueya Naheu	Men's 90 kg	Harris (SLE); **W** 100–000	Feuillet (MRI); **L** 000s2–001s2	Did not advance	Petgrave (ENG); **L** 000s3–100	Did not advance	7
**Franck Tahman Zan**	Men's 100 kg	Bye	Kroussaniotakis (CYP); **L** 002s3–100s1	Did not advance	Ceesay (GAM); **W** 100–000	Barratt (WAL); **W** 100s1–001s1	3rd place, bronze medalist(s)
**Marie Baba Matia**	Women's 52 kg	Cinthya Badru (MOZ); **W** 100s1–000s2	Sofia Asvesta (CYP); **L** 001–100s1	Did not advance	Rioux (MRI); **W** 100s2–000s3	Easton (AUS); **W** 100–000	3rd place, bronze medalist(s)
Georgika Djengue Moune	Women's 78 kg	Bye	Michaelidou (CYP); **L** 000s2–101s1	Did not advance	Narang (IND); **L** 002s1–010s1	Did not advance	7
**Richelle Soppi Mbella**	Women's +78 kg	Bye	Wood (TTO); **W** 100–000	Hanna (BAH); **W** 101–000s1	Bye	Andrews (NZL); **L** 000–100	2nd place, silver medalist(s)

== Weightlifting ==
Cameroon qualified two male weightlifters.

Men

Athlete	Event	Snatch (kg)		Clean & Jerk (kg)		Total (kg)	Rank
Athlete	Event	Result	Rank	Result	Rank	Total (kg)	Rank
Daniel Onana Tanga	94 kg	147	6	187	3	334	4
Junior Ngadja Nyabeyeu	110 kg	NM		DNF			

=== Para powerlifting ===
Cameroon qualified three para powerlifters (one man and two women).

Athlete	Event	Result	Rank
Balinga Manga	Men's lightweight	103.9	10
Suzanne Menye M'eto	Women's lightweight	87.9	8
Thamar Mengue	Women's heavyweight	93.8	5
