= Trinidad and Tobago at the 2026 Commonwealth Games =

- Flag of Trinidad and Tobago
- CG code: TTO
- CGA: Trinidad and Tobago Olympic Committee
- Website: ttoc.org

in Glasgow, Scotland 23 July 2026 – 2 August 2026
- Competitors: 37 in 6 sports
- Flag bearer: Nigel Paul
- Baton bearer: Joelisa Cooper
- Medals Ranked 26th: Gold 0 Silver 3 Bronze 4 Total 7

Commonwealth Games appearances (overview)
- 1934; 1938; 1950; 1954; 1958; 1962; 1966; 1970; 1974; 1978; 1982; 1986; 1990; 1994; 1998; 2002; 2006; 2010; 2014; 2018; 2022; 2026; 2030

Trinidad and Tobago competed at the 2026 Commonwealth Games in Glasgow, Scotland. This marked Trinidad and Tobago's 20th participation at the games, after making its debut at the 1934 Commonwealth Games.

The King's Baton relay stopped in Trinidad and Tobago in March 2025.

The Trinidad and Tobago team consisted of 38 athletes competing in six sports. This was later reduced to 37 athletes. Boxer Nigel Paul was the country's flagbearer during the opening ceremony. Meanwhile, netball athlete Joelisa Cooper was the baton bearer during the opening ceremony.

Trinidad and Tobago finished the games with seven medals, three silver and four bronze, to rank 26th on the medal table.

== Competitors ==
The following is the list of number of competitors participating at the Games per sport/discipline.

Sport		Men	Women	Total
Artistic gymnastics		1	1	2
Athletics	Athletics	7	6	13
Athletics	Para-athletics	1	0	1
Boxing		3	0	3
Judo		1	1	2
Netball		—N/a	12	12
Track cycling		4	0	4
Total		17	20	37

== Medalists ==
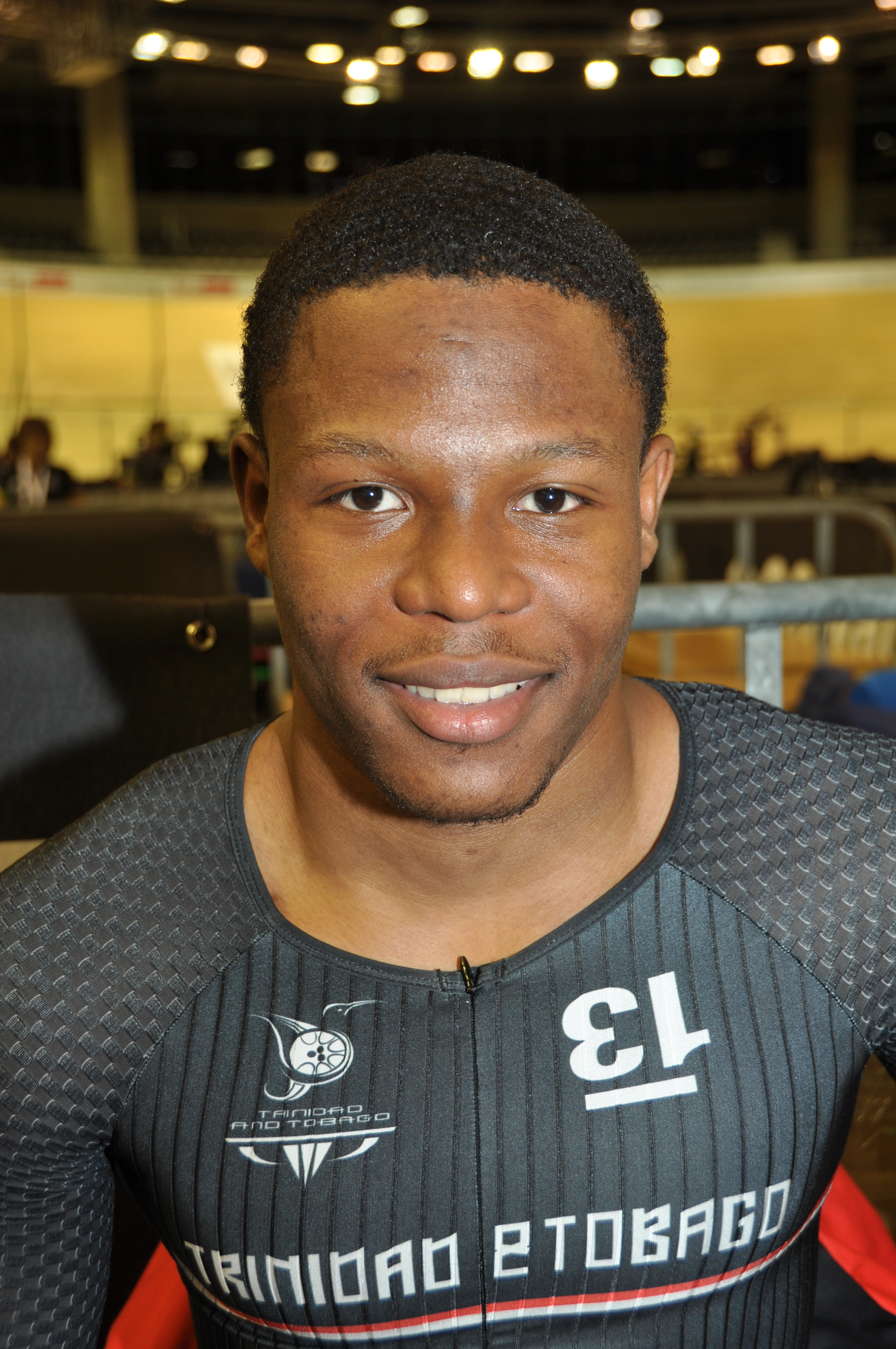
Nicholas Paul won silver in the men's sprint track cycling event

The following competitors won medals at the games. In the by discipline sections below, medallists' names are bolded.

Medal	Name	Sport	Event	Date	Ref.
Silver	Shaniqua Bascombe	Athletics	Women's 200 metres	31 July	
Silver	Nicholas Paul	Track cycling	Men's sprint	1 August	
Silver	Jereem Richards	Athletics	Men's 400 metres	1 August	
Bronze	Akeem Stewart	Athletics	Men's discus throw (F44)	29 July	
Bronze	Nicholas Paul; Njisane Phillip; Zion Pulido	Track cycling	Men's team sprint	30 July	
Bronze	Nigel Paul	Boxing	Men's +90 kg	31 July	
Bronze	Michelle-Lee Ahye; Shaniqua Bascombe; Leah Bertrand; Reese Webster	Athletics	Women's 4 × 100 metres relay	1 August	

== Artistic gymnastics ==
Trinidad and Tobago selected entered two gymnasts, one per gender.

Men
Individual Qualification

Athlete	Event	Apparatus						Total	Rank
Athlete	Event	F	PH	R	V	PB	HB	Total	Rank
Chane Cumbernack	All-around	11.050	11.200	11.000	13.900	11.000	12.050	70.200	21 Q

Individual Finals

Athlete	Event	Apparatus						Total	Rank
Athlete	Event	F	PH	R	V	PB	HB	Total	Rank
Chane Cumbermack	All-around	12.250	10.900	11.300	13.600	12.250	12.150	72.450	13

Women
Individual Qualification

Athlete	Event	Apparatus				Total	Rank
Athlete	Event	VT	UB	BB	FL	Total	Rank
Dailia Burke	All-around	11.900	9.400	8.600	10.450	40.350	31

== Athletics ==
Trinidad and Tobago announced their full team (seven men, six women, along with one male para athlete) on 27 June 2026.

Key

Ranks given for track events are within the athlete's heat only.

- Q = Qualified for the next round
- q = Qualified for the next round as a fastest loser or, in field events, by position without achieving the qualifying target

Men
Track

Athlete	Event	Heat		Semifinal		Final	
Athlete	Event	Result	Rank	Result	Rank	Result	Rank
Eric Harrison Jr	100 metres	10.56	3	Did not advance			
Omari Lewis	100 metres	10.18	1 q	10.15	5	Did not advance	
Jaden Marchan	400 metres	46.17	3 q	45.89	5	Did not advance	
Jereem Richards	400 metres	45.72	1 q	45.06	1 Q	44.82	2nd place, silver medalist(s)
Nathan Cumberbatch	800 metres	1:48.97	5	Did not advance			

Field

Athlete	Event	Qualification		Final	
Athlete	Event	Distance	Rank	Distance	Rank
Keshorn Walcott	Javelin throw	78.26	11 q	82.55	6
Kelsey Daniel	Triple jump	Did not start		Did not advance	
Kelsey Daniel	Long jump	7.74	10 q	7.90	7

Women
Track

Athlete	Event	Heat		Semifinal		Final	
Athlete	Event	Result	Rank	Result	Rank	Result	Rank
Michelle-Lee Ahye	100 metres	11.35	2 q	11.28	4	Did not advance	
Leah Bertrand	100 metres	11.44	1 q	11.45	5	Did not advance	
Reese Webster	100 metres	11.63	2	Did not advance			
Shaniqua Bascombe	200 metres	Bye		22.31 PB	1 Q	22.35	2nd place, silver medalist(s)
Reese Webster	200 metres	24.09	3	Did not advance			
Michelle-Lee Ahye; Shaniqua Bascombe; Leah Bertrand; Reese Webster	4 x 100 m relay	43.31	2 Q	—N/a		43.07	3rd place, bronze medalist(s)

Field

Athlete	Event	Qualification		Final	
Athlete	Event	Distance	Rank	Distance	Rank
Janae De Gannes	Long jump	6.31	11 q	6.28	11
Tyra Gittens–Spotsville	Long jump	6.55	9 q	6.74	5

=== Para athletics ===
Field event

Athlete	Event	Final	
Athlete	Event	Distance	Rank
Akeem stewart	Men's discus throw (F44)	56.82	3rd place, bronze medalist(s)

== Boxing ==
Trinidad and Tobago entered three male boxers.

Men

Athlete	Event	Preliminaries	Preliminaries	Quarterfinal	Semifinal	Final	
Athlete	Event	Opposition Result	Opposition Result	Opposition Result	Opposition Result	Opposition Result	Rank
Anthony Joseph	60 kg	Ndevelo (NAM); L WO	Did not advance				
Jeremiah Thomas	80 kg	Tonga (TGA); L 0–5	Did not advance				
Nigel Paul	+90 kg	—N/a		Salifou (TOG); W 5–0	Berwal (IND); L 0–5	Did not advance	3rd place, bronze medalist(s)

== Judo ==
Trinidad and Tobago entered two judoka, one of each gender.

Athlete	Event	Round of 32	Round of 16	Quarterfinals	Semifinals	Repechage	Final/BM	
Athlete	Event	Opposition Result	Opposition Result	Opposition Result	Opposition Result	Opposition Result	Opposition Result	Rank
Jelanie Boyce	Men's 73 kg	Bye	Robinson (NZL); L 000–100	Did not advance				
Gabriella Wood	Women's +78 kg	—N/a	Bye	Mbella (CMR); L 000–100	Did not advance	Koro (TOG); W 100–000	Avaro (GAB); L 000–100	5

== Netball ==
Trinidad and Tobago qualified as one of the top 11 eligible teams in the World Netball Rankings as of September 1, 2025.

Summary

Team	Event	Group stage						Semifinal	Final / BM / Cl.	
Team	Event	Opposition Result	Opposition Result	Opposition Result	Opposition Result	Opposition Result	Rank	Opposition Result	Opposition Result	Rank
Trinidad and Tobago	Women's tournament	Jamaica; L 22–81	Uganda; L 36–80	Scotland; L 27–77	Wales; L 30–74	New Zealand; L 23–83	6	Did not advance	11th place match Northern Ireland; L 39–78	12

Squad
The squad consisted of 12 athletes.

- Janeisha Cassimy
- Joelisa Cooper
- Nichola Gill
- Makayla Grant
- Demisha Henry
- Aneisha Hyles
- Shian Lewis
- Adannaya Martin
- Jeresia Mc Eachrane
- Shaniya Morgan
- Afeisha Noel
- Ebony Williams

Group stage

Pos	Team	Pld	W	D	L	GF	GA	GD	Pts	Qualification
1	New Zealand	5	5	0	0	333	202	+131	10	Semi-finals
2	Jamaica	5	4	0	1	303	195	+108	8	Semi-finals
3	Uganda	5	3	0	2	303	255	+48	6	Classification matches
4	Scotland	5	2	0	3	276	258	+18	4	Classification matches
5	Wales	5	1	0	4	236	284	−48	2	Classification matches
6	Trinidad and Tobago	5	0	0	5	138	395	−257	0	Classification matches

Source: Glasgow 2026

25 July 2026; 19:00	Report	Jamaica	81–22	Trinidad and Tobago	OVO Hydro; Umpires: Louise Travis, Gareth Fowler; Reserve umpire: Bronwen Adams
25 July 2026; 19:00	Report	Scoring by quarter: 24–5, 19–7, 17–8, 21–2			OVO Hydro; Umpires: Louise Travis, Gareth Fowler; Reserve umpire: Bronwen Adams
25 July 2026; 19:00	Report	Azara Wilmot 33/41 (80%); Romelda Aiken-George 25/27 (93%); Shanice Beckford 16/16 (100%); Rhea Dixon 7/11 (64%)		Afeisha Noel 17/19 (89%); Joelisa Cooper 5/7 (71%)	OVO Hydro; Umpires: Louise Travis, Gareth Fowler; Reserve umpire: Bronwen Adams

26 July 2026; 19:00	Report	Uganda	80–36	Trinidad and Tobago	OVO Hydro; Umpires: Tracy-Ann Griffiths, Ken Metekingi; Reserve umpire: Gary Burgess
26 July 2026; 19:00	Report	Scoring by quarter: 19–10, 21–9, 16–11, 24–6			OVO Hydro; Umpires: Tracy-Ann Griffiths, Ken Metekingi; Reserve umpire: Gary Burgess
26 July 2026; 19:00	Report	Mary Cholhok 32/41 (78%); Alice Isoto 21/21 (100%); Shadiah Nassanga 19/20 (95%); Racheal Nanyonga 8/10 (80%)		Afeisha Noel 24/27 (89%); Demisha Henry 7/8 (88%); Joelisa Cooper 5/6 (83%)	OVO Hydro; Umpires: Tracy-Ann Griffiths, Ken Metekingi; Reserve umpire: Gary Burgess

27 July 2026; 21:00	Report	Scotland	77−27	Trinidad and Tobago	OVO Hydro; Umpires: Alison Harrison, Angela Armstrong-Lush; Reserve umpire: Gareth Fowler
27 July 2026; 21:00	Report	Scoring by quarter: 24–6, 18−8, 15–7, 20−6			OVO Hydro; Umpires: Alison Harrison, Angela Armstrong-Lush; Reserve umpire: Gareth Fowler
27 July 2026; 21:00	Report	Cerys Cairns 50/56 (89%); Emma Barrie 21/21 (100%); Niamh McCall 3/5 (60%); Bethan Goodwin 3/7 (43%)		Afeisha Noel 16/17 (94%); Makayla Grant 3/3 (100%); Joelisa Cooper 3/4 (75%); Shaniya Morgan 3/7 (43%); Demisha Henry 2/3 (67%)	OVO Hydro; Umpires: Alison Harrison, Angela Armstrong-Lush; Reserve umpire: Gareth Fowler

28 July 2026; 16:00	Report	Wales	74–30	Trinidad and Tobago	OVO Hydro; Umpires: Tracy-Ann Griffiths, Kristie Simpson; Reserve umpire: Gary Burgess
28 July 2026; 16:00	Report	Scoring by quarter: 23–8, 20−11, 15–5, 16−6			OVO Hydro; Umpires: Tracy-Ann Griffiths, Kristie Simpson; Reserve umpire: Gary Burgess
28 July 2026; 16:00	Report	Georgia Rowe 31/31 (100%); Nansi Kuti 23/30 (77%); Phillipa Yarranton 10/11 (91%); Zoe Matthewman 10/13 (77%)		Afeisha Noel 15/17 (88%); Makayla Grant 6/7 (86%); Demisha Henry 5/7 (71%); Joelisa Cooper 4/5 (80%)	OVO Hydro; Umpires: Tracy-Ann Griffiths, Kristie Simpson; Reserve umpire: Gary Burgess

30 July 2026; 14:00	Report	New Zealand	83–23	Trinidad and Tobago	OVO Hydro; Umpires: Tracy-Ann Griffiths, Kate Mann; Reserve umpire: Louise Travis
30 July 2026; 14:00	Report	Scoring by quarter: 21–4, 20–9, 23–5, 19–5			OVO Hydro; Umpires: Tracy-Ann Griffiths, Kate Mann; Reserve umpire: Louise Travis
30 July 2026; 14:00	Report	Grace Nweke 34/36 (94%); Amelia Walmsley 34/38 (89%); Martina Salmon 15/16 (94%)		Afeisha Noel 21/24 (88%); Joelisa Cooper 2/3 (67%)	OVO Hydro; Umpires: Tracy-Ann Griffiths, Kate Mann; Reserve umpire: Louise Travis

11th place match

31 July 2026; 09:00	Report	Northern Ireland	78–39	Trinidad and Tobago	OVO Hydro; Umpires: Tracy-Ann Griffiths, Alison Harrison; Reserve umpire: Kate Mann
31 July 2026; 09:00	Report	Scoring by quarter: 19–10, 21–8, 20–10, 18–11			OVO Hydro; Umpires: Tracy-Ann Griffiths, Alison Harrison; Reserve umpire: Kate Mann
31 July 2026; 09:00	Report	Lisa Bowman 45/51 (88%); Orlaith Rogers 14/15 (93%); Georgie McGrath 10/10 (100%); Emma Magee 9/9 (100%)		Afeisha Noel 26/31 (84%); Joelisa Cooper 6/6 (100%); Demisha Henry 6/7 (86%); Janeisha Cassimy 1/1 (100%)	OVO Hydro; Umpires: Tracy-Ann Griffiths, Alison Harrison; Reserve umpire: Kate Mann

== Track cycling ==
Trinidad and Tobago entered four male track cyclists.

Elimination race

Athlete	Event	Final
Athlete	Event	Rank
Jadian Neaves	Men's elimination race	9

Keirin

Athlete	Event	1st Round	Repechage	Semifinals	Final
Athlete	Event	Rank	Rank	Rank	Rank
Nicholas Paul	Men's keirin	3 R	1 Q	3 FA	4
Njisane Phillip	Men's keirin	6 R	2	Did not advance	
Zion Pulido	Men's keirin	7 R	3	Did not advance	

Points race

Athlete	Event	Qualification		Final	
Athlete	Event	Points	Rank	Points	Rank
Jadian Neaves	Men's point race	–18	10	Did not advance	

Scratch race

Athlete	Event	Qualification	Final
Athlete	Event	Rank	Rank
Jadian Neaves	Men's scratch race	11 Q	DNF

Sprint

Athlete	Event	Qualification		Round 1	Quarterfinals	Semifinals	Final	
Athlete	Event	Time	Rank	Opposition Result	Opposition Result	Opposition Result	Opposition Result	Rank
Nicholas Paul	Men's sprint	9.603	2 Q	Lloyd (WAL); W	Barber (AUS); W	Ledingham-Horn (ENG); W	Hoffman (AUS); L	2nd place, silver medalist(s)
Njisane Phillip	Men's sprint	9.630	3 Q	Mitchell (SCO); W	Ledingham-Horn (ENG); L	Did not advance		
Zion Pulido	Men's sprint	10.252	21	Did not advance				
Nicholas Paul; Njisane Phillip; Zion Pulido	Men's team sprint	42.817	3 QB	—N/a			Wales; W WO	3rd place, bronze medalist(s)

Time trial

Athlete	Event	Time	Rank
Nicholas Paul	Men's time trial	1:00.794	7
