= Athletics at the 2026 Commonwealth Games – Men's 100 metres =

Men's 100 metres at the 2026 Commonwealth Games
- Venue: Scotstoun Stadium, Glasgow
- Dates: 27 July 2026 (round 1); 28 July 2026 (semi-finals and final)
- Competitors: 76 from 43 nations
- Winning time: 9.83 GR, NR

Medalists
gold medal	Emmanuel Eseme	Cameroon
silver medal	Lachlan Kennedy	Australia
bronze medal	Kayinsola Ajayi	Nigeria

The men's 100 metres at the 2026 Commonwealth Games, as part of the athletics programme, took place at the Scotstoun Stadium from 27 to 28 July 2026. The champion from 2022, Kenya's Ferdinand Omanyala returned to attempt to defend his title, having been selected by Team Kenya, but failed to reach the final. The final was won in torrential conditions, in a new Games and national record, by Cameroon's Emmanuel Eseme, while Australian Lachlan Kennedy broke the Australian national record to take silver, with Nigerian Kayinsola Ajayi in bronze.

== Records ==
Prior to this competition, the existing world, Commonwealth and Commonwealth Games records were as follows:

Men's 100 m
World record	9.58	Usain Bolt (JAM)	16 Aug 2009	Berlin, Germany
Commonwealth record	9.58	Usain Bolt (JAM)	16 Aug 2009	Berlin, Germany
Games record	9.88	Ato Boldon (TTO)	17 Sep 1998	Kuala Lumpur, Malaysia

== Schedule ==
The schedule is as follows:

Date	Time	Round
27 July 2026	10:00	Round 1
28 July 2026	19:10	Semi-finals
28 July 2026	21:14	Final

All times are United Kingdom time (UTC+1)

== Results ==
=== Round 1 ===
Round 1 was held on the morning of 27 July 2026. 17 best performers (q) advance to the semi-finals.

==== Heat 1 ====
Place	Lane	Athlete	Nation	Time	Notes
1	4	Favour Ashe	Nigeria	10.10	q
2	6	Meshack Babu	Kenya	10.21	q
3	3	Akeem Stewart	Guyana	10.55 [.544]	
4	7	Wissy Hoye	Gabon	10.55 [.545]	
5	8	Trenton Brooks	Anguilla	10.67	
6	2	Md Nazul Putera Faeiz Firdaous	Brunei	10.81	PB
7	5	Komi Bernard Konu	Togo	11.10	SB
				Wind: (+1.5 m/s)	

==== Heat 2 ====
Place	Lane	Athlete	Nation	Time	Notes
1	3	Abdul-Rasheed Saminu	Ghana	10.01	q, SB
2	7	Orphée Topize	Mauritius	10.38	
3	4	McKish Compton	Saint Vincent and the Grenadines	10.51	
4	8	Noelex Holder	Guyana	10.65	
5	5	Mlandvo Maziya	Eswatini	10.69	
6	6	Winzar Kakiouea	Nauru	11.04	
7	2	Ty-Stroud Leo	Saint Helena	11.85	SB
				Wind: (+1.9 m/s)	

==== Heat 3 ====
Place	Lane	Athlete	Nation	Time	Notes
1	5	Jeremiah Azu	Wales	10.10	q
2	6	Duan Asemota	Canada	10.16	q
3	2	Dineth Weeraratna	Sri Lanka	10.33	PB
4	8	Pais Wisil	Papua New Guinea	10.57	
5	3	Graham Pellegrini	Malta	10.84	
6	4	Gael Barreau	Seychelles	10.94	
				Wind: (+1.7 m/s)	

==== Heat 4 ====
Place	Lane	Athlete	Nation	Time	Notes
1	6	Rohan Watson	Jamaica	10.13	q
2	5	Gurindervir Singh	India	10.39	
3	8	Charley Matundu	Namibia	10.50	
4	3	Alieu Joof	The Gambia	10.52	
5	4	Steven Mackay	Jersey	10.68	SB
6	7	Markey Zephirn	Turks and Caicos Islands	11.00	
7	2	Tyler Anthony	Saint Helena	11.46	PB
				Wind: (+1.5 m/s)	

==== Heat 5 ====
Place	Lane	Athlete	Nation	Time	Notes
1	4	Benjamin Azamati	Ghana	10.00	q, SB
2	3	Jamie Oldham	Jersey	10.41	PB
3	2	Shamar Horatio	Guyana	10.43	
4	8	Julian Forde	Barbados	10.58	
5	6	Rizon Rara	Vanuatu	11.13	
6	5	Kanaee Malua	Tuvalu	11.56	SB
–	7	Claude Itoungue Bongogne	Cameroon	DNS	
				Wind: (+1.2 m/s)	

==== Heat 6 ====
Place	Lane	Athlete	Nation	Time	Notes
1	2	Cejhae Greene	Antigua and Barbuda	10.12	q, SB
2	5	Eliezer Adjibi	Canada	10.31	
3	3	Eric Harrison Jr	Trinidad and Tobago	10.56	
4	6	Joshan Vencatasamy	Mauritius	10.60	
5	7	Johnny Bai	Papua New Guinea	10.80	
6	4	Pau Funes Fa	Gibraltar	11.38	=PB
7	8	Usufono Eneli	Tuvalu	11.48	
				Wind: (+2.0 m/s)	

==== Heat 7 ====
Place	Lane	Athlete	Nation	Time	Notes
1	2	Bradley Nkoana	South Africa	10.16	q
2	8	Rohan Browning	Australia	10.24 [.233]	q
3	7	Kuron Griffith	Barbados	10.24 [.233]	q
4	6	Shamarie Roberts	Saint Kitts and Nevis	10.63	
5	3	Zachary Saunders	Jersey	10.72	
6	4	Kenaz Kaniwete	Kiribati	10.86	NR
7	5	Shernyl Burns	Montserrat	11.26	SB
				Wind: (+1.8 m/s)	

==== Heat 8 ====
Place	Lane	Athlete	Nation	Time	Notes
1	6	Cheswill Johnson	South Africa	10.21	q
2	7	Jaleel Croal	British Virgin Islands	10.29	
3	4	Chamod Yodasinghe	Sri Lanka	10.45	
4	2	Dwayne Fleming	Antigua and Barbuda	10.83	
5	8	Tovetuna Tuna	Papua New Guinea	10.91	
6	5	Maketi Faaniu Kesili	Tuvalu	11.71	SB
				Wind: (+0.6 m/s)	

==== Heat 9 ====
Place	Lane	Athlete	Nation	Time	Notes
1	6	Omari Lewis	Trinidad and Tobago	10.18	q
2	5	Rikkoi Brathwaite	British Virgin Islands	10.37	
3	2	Imranur Rahman	Bangladesh	10.39	
4	7	Isaac Botsio	Ghana	10.40	
5	4	Hassan Saaid	Maldives	10.77	
6	3	Tevique Benjamin	Montserrat	10.88	
				Wind: (+0.9 m/s)	

==== Heat 10 ====
Place	Lane	Athlete	Nation	Time	Notes
1	7	Mojela Koneshe	Lesotho	10.07	q, NR
2	3	Adekalu Fakorede	Nigeria	10.21	q
3	2	Marc Brian Louis	Singapore	10.38 [.372]	SB
4	4	Mark Odhiambo	Kenya	10.38 [.377]	
5	6	Thandaza Zwane	Eswatini	10.69	
6	8	Toho Joshua	Vanuatu	10.91	PB
7	5	Saymon Rijo	Anguilla	11.42	SB
				Wind: (+1.4 m/s)	

==== Heat 11 ====
Place	Lane	Athlete	Nation	Time	Notes
1	2	Elliot Jones	England	10.07	q
2	7	Eddie Osei-Nketia	Australia	10.07	q
3	8	Ebrahima Camara	The Gambia	10.29	
4	3	Médard Nayo	Togo	10.30	
5	6	Sean Crowie	Saint Helena	10.61	
6	4	Ronaldo Registre	Turks and Caicos Islands	10.76	
7	5	Odysius Melanie	Seychelles	10.82	
				Wind: (+3.9 m/s)	

=== Semi-finals ===
The semi-finals took place in the early evening of 28 July 2026. First 2 in each heat (Q) and the next 2 fastest (q) advance to the final.

==== Heat 1 ====
Place	Lane	Athlete	Nation	Time	Notes
1	3	Emmanuel Eseme	Cameroon	9.89	Q, NR
2	5	Lachlan Kennedy	Australia	9.94	Q, PB
3	4	Benjamin Azamati	Ghana	10.00	q, =SB
4	7	Cheswill Johnson	South Africa	10.05	q
5	6	Favour Ashe	Nigeria	10.07	
6	2	Rohan Watson	Jamaica	10.12	
7	8	Duan Asemota	Canada	10.14	
8	1	Meshack Babu	Kenya	10.39	
				Wind: (±0.0 m/s)	

==== Heat 2 ====
Place	Lane	Athlete	Nation	Time	Notes
1	4	Kayinsola Ajayi	Nigeria	9.94	Q
2	2	Jeremiah Azu	Wales	10.00	Q, SB
3	3	Abdul-Rasheed Saminu	Ghana	10.06	
4	8	Rohan Browning	Australia	10.14	SB
5	7	Omari Lewis	Trinidad and Tobago	10.15	
6	5	Ferdinand Omanyala	Kenya	10.19	
7	1	Elliot Jones	England	10.24	
—	6	Bradley Nkoana	South Africa	DQ	TR16.8
				Wind: (+0.7 m/s)	

==== Heat 3 ====
Place	Lane	Athlete	Nation	Time	Notes
1	3	Gift Leotlela	South Africa	10.02	Q
2	7	Eddie Osei-Nketia	Australia	10.03	Q, PB
3	6	Ackeem Blake	Jamaica	10.06	
4	4	Adekalu Fakorede	Nigeria	10.06	
5	5	Jerome Blake	Canada	10.12	
6	8	Cejhae Greene	Antigua and Barbuda	10.19	
7	2	Mojela Koneshe	Lesotho	10.19	
8	1	Kuron Griffith	Barbados	10.26	
				Wind: (+1.1 m/s)	

=== Final ===
The final took place in the evening of the 28 July 2026.

Place	Lane	Athlete	Nation	Time	Notes
1st place, gold medalist(s)	5	Emmanuel Eseme	Cameroon	9.83	GR, NR
2nd place, silver medalist(s)	3	Lachlan Kennedy	Australia	9.85	AR
3rd place, bronze medalist(s)	4	Kayinsola Ajayi	Nigeria	9.90	
4	6	Gift Leotlela	South Africa	9.91	SB
5	7	Jeremiah Azu	Wales	10.03	
6	2	Eddie Osei-Nketia	Australia	10.06	
7	1	Benjamin Azamati	Ghana	10.11	
8	8	Cheswill Johnson	South Africa	10.13	
				Wind: (+1.3 m/s)	
