= Judo at the 2026 Commonwealth Games =

Judo Judo at the 2026 Commonwealth Games
- Judo pictogram
- Venue: SEC Centre
- Location: Glasgow, Scotland
- Dates: 31 July to 2 August 2026
- Competitors: 176 from 41 nations

Competition at external databases
- Links: IJF • JudoInside

Judo at the 2026 Commonwealth Games was the sixth appearance of Judo at the Commonwealth Games. The judo competitions at the 2026 Commonwealth Games were held in Glasgow, Scotland, for the final three days of the 2026 Commonwealth Games from 31 July to 2 August 2026. This was the sixth edition since judo was introduced as a demonstration sport in 1986 and made official at the next games in 1990. Initially classified as an optional sport until 2014 judo became a core sport from 2022 onwards. The third time, including 1986, that the event has been held in Scotland, and the second time in Glasgow, the competition will be spread across fourteen weight categories for both men and women.

== Schedule ==
The competition schedule is as follows:

Preliminaries, quarter-finals, semi-finals & repechages	Medal matches

Men
Date Event	Fri 31		Sat 1		Sun 2	
Session →	M	E	M	E	M	E
60 kg						
66 kg						
73 kg						
81 kg						
90 kg						
100 kg						
+100 kg						

Women
Date Event	Fri 31		Sat 1		Sun 2	
Session →	M	E	M	E	M	E
48 kg						
52 kg						
57 kg						
63 kg						
70 kg						
78 kg						
+78 kg						

== Venue ==
The judo competitions were held at the SEC Centre

== Medal summary ==
=== Medal table ===
* Host nation (Scotland)

Rank	CGA	Gold	Silver	Bronze	Total
1	England	4	2	6	12
2	Canada	4	2	1	7
3	India	2	1	1	4
4	Cyprus	1	2	4	7
5	New Zealand	1	0	1	2
6	Malaysia	1	0	0	1
6	Mauritius	1	0	0	1
8	Australia	0	5	2	7
9	Cameroon	0	1	2	3
10	South Africa	0	1	1	2
11	Northern Ireland	0	0	2	2
11	Scotland*	0	0	2	2
13	Bahamas	0	0	1	1
13	Gabon	0	0	1	1
13	Malta	0	0	1	1
13	Nigeria	0	0	1	1
13	The Gambia	0	0	1	1
13	Tonga	0	0	1	1
Totals (18 entries)		14	14	28	56

=== Men ===
Event	Gold	Silver	Bronze
60 kg	Harsh Singh; India	Joshua Katz; Australia	Charlie Ayre; England
60 kg	Harsh Singh; India	Joshua Katz; Australia	Pedro Antun Neto; Australia
66 kg	Julien Frascadore; Canada	Georgios Balarjishvili; Cyprus	Michael Fryer; England
66 kg	Julien Frascadore; Canada	Georgios Balarjishvili; Cyprus	Petros Christodoulidis; Cyprus
73 kg	Ethan Nairne; England	Benjamin Levy; England	Joshua Green; Northern Ireland
73 kg	Ethan Nairne; England	Benjamin Levy; England	Faye Njie; The Gambia
81 kg	Amir Daniel Abdul Majeed; Malaysia	Timothy Meuwsen; South Africa	Keishin Ochi; Australia
81 kg	Amir Daniel Abdul Majeed; Malaysia	Timothy Meuwsen; South Africa	Odysseas Georgakis; Cyprus
90 kg	Rémi Feuillet; Mauritius	Guillaume Gaulin; Canada	Jamal Petgrave; England
90 kg	Rémi Feuillet; Mauritius	Guillaume Gaulin; Canada	Scott Cusack; Scotland
100 kg	Kyle Reyes; Canada	Max Gregory; England	Georgious Kroussaniotakis; Cyprus
100 kg	Kyle Reyes; Canada	Max Gregory; England	Franck Tahman Zan; Cameroon
+100 kg	Giannis Antoniou; Cyprus	Kayhan Ozcicek-Takagi; Australia	Kody Andrews; New Zealand
+100 kg	Giannis Antoniou; Cyprus	Kayhan Ozcicek-Takagi; Australia	Paula Monta; Tonga

=== Women ===
Event	Gold	Silver	Bronze
48 kg	Asmita Dey; India	Heidi Quach; Canada	Katryna Esposito; Malta
48 kg	Asmita Dey; India	Heidi Quach; Canada	Summer Shaw; Scotland
52 kg	Evelyn Beaton; Canada	Sofia Asvesta; Cyprus	Tatum Keen; England
52 kg	Evelyn Beaton; Canada	Sofia Asvesta; Cyprus	Marie-Céline Baba Matia; Cameroon
57 kg	Acelya Toprak; England	Yamini Mourya; India	Donne Breytenbach; South Africa
57 kg	Acelya Toprak; England	Yamini Mourya; India	Lele Neirne; England
63 kg	Laurence Biron; Canada	Saya Middleton; Australia	Unnati Sharma; India
63 kg	Laurence Biron; Canada	Saya Middleton; Australia	Enku Ekuta; Nigeria
70 kg	Kelly Petersen Pollard; England	Aoife Coughlan; Australia	Rachael Hawkes; Northern Ireland
70 kg	Kelly Petersen Pollard; England	Aoife Coughlan; Australia	Jemima Yeats-Brown; England
78 kg	Emma Reid; England	Maria Swan; Australia	Coralie Godbout; Canada
78 kg	Emma Reid; England	Maria Swan; Australia	Zanet Michaelidou; Cyprus
+78 kg	Sydnee Andrews; New Zealand	Richelle Soppi Mbella; Cameroon	Karra Hanna; Bahamas
+78 kg	Sydnee Andrews; New Zealand	Richelle Soppi Mbella; Cameroon	Marthe Gnacadja Avaro; Gabon

== Participating nations ==
There are 45 participating Commonwealth Games Associations (CGA's) in judo with a total of 176 (100 men and 76 women) athletes. The number of athletes a nation entered is in parentheses beside the name of the country.

- Australia (11)
- Bahamas (2)
- Barbados (1)
- Botswana (2)
- Cameroon (5)
- Canada (10)
- Cyprus (8)
- England (14)
- Eswatini (1)
- Fiji (1)
- Gabon (2)
- The Gambia (2)
- Ghana (2)
- Gibraltar (2)
- India (12)
- Jamaica (2)
- Jersey (1)
- Kenya (4)
- Kiribati (2)
- Malawi (3)
- Malaysia (1)
- Malta (2)
- Mauritius (10)
- Mozambique (2)
- Nauru (2)
- New Zealand (8)
- Nigeria (4)
- Northern Ireland (3)
- Pakistan (1)
- Rwanda (1)
- Samoa (1)
- Scotland (13)
- Seychelles (3)
- Sierra Leone (2)
- Solomon Islands (2)
- South Africa (4)
- Sri Lanka (2)
- Tanzania (2)
- Togo (3)
- Tonga (1)
- Trinidad and Tobago (2)
- Uganda (2)
- Vanuatu (3)
- Wales (8)
- Zambia (5)
