= Gabon at the 2026 Commonwealth Games =

- Flag of Gabon
- CG code: GAB
- CGA: Gabonese Olympic Committee
- Website: www.cnog.ga

in Glasgow, Scotland 23 July 2026 – 2 August 2026
- Competitors: 7 in 3 sports
- Flag bearer: Noélie Annette Lacour
- Baton bearer: Kurt Ogouenkero
- Medals Ranked =36th: Gold 0 Silver 0 Bronze 1 Total 1

Commonwealth Games appearances (overview)
- 2026; 2030

Gabon competed at the 2026 Commonwealth Games in Glasgow, Scotland. This marked Gabon's debut at the games, after joining the Commonwealth of Nations in 2022.

The Gabonese team consisted of seven athletes (three men and four women) competing in three sports. On the eve of the games, the Gabonese boxing team was withdrawn due to not completing mandatory gender testing in time.

Swimmer Noélie Annette Lacour was the country's flagbearer during the opening ceremony. Meanwhile, team official Kurt Ogouenkero was the baton bearer during the opening ceremony.

On the final day of the Games, Gabon achieved its first ever medal, with judoka Marthe Gnacadja Avora winning a bronze medal in the Women's +78 kg super heavyweight class.

== Competitors ==
The following is the list of number of competitors participating at the Games per sport/discipline.

| Sport | Men | Women | Total |
|---|---|---|---|
| Athletics | 2 | 2 | 4 |
| Judo | 1 | 1 | 2 |
| Swimming | 0 | 1 | 1 |
| Total | 3 | 4 | 7 |

== Medallist ==
The following Gabonese competitor a won medal at the games. In the by discipline sections below, medallists' names are bolded.

| Medal | Name | Sport | Event | Date | Ref. |
|---|---|---|---|---|---|
| Bronze | Marthe Gnacadja Avaro | Judo | Women's +78 kg | 2 August | |

== Athletics ==
Gabon entered four athletes, two per gender.

Key

Ranks given for track events are within the athlete's heat only.

- **Q** = Qualified for the next round
- **q** = Qualified for the next round as a fastest loser or, in field events, by position without achieving the qualifying target

Track events

| Athlete | Event | Heat | | Semifinal | | Final | |
| Athlete | Event | Result | Rank | Result | Rank | Result | Rank |
|---|---|---|---|---|---|---|---|
| Wissy Frank Hoye Yenda Moukoula | Men's 100 m | 10.55 | 4 | Did not advance | | | |
| Wissy Frank Hoye Yenda Moukoula | Men's 200 m | DQ | | Did not advance | | | |
| Guy Maganga Gorra | Men's 200 m | 20.69 | 2 **q** | 21.10 | 8 | Did not advance | |
| Pierrick Linda Moulin | Women's 100 m | 11.47 | 2 **q** | 11.54 | 7 | Did not advance | |

Field event

| Athlete | Event | Final | |
| Athlete | Event | Distance | Rank |
|---|---|---|---|
| Carine Bacchetta-Mekam | Shot put | 14.88 | 9 |

== Judo ==
Gabon entered two judoka for the Games, one of each gender.

| Athlete | Event | Round of 16 | Quarterfinals | Semifinals | Repechage | Final/BM | |
| Athlete | Event | Opposition Result | Opposition Result | Opposition Result | Opposition Result | Opposition Result | Rank |
|---|---|---|---|---|---|---|---|
| Fernand Nkaro | Men's 81 kg | Bye | Majeed (MAS); **L** 0s1–001s1 | Did not advance | Mlugu (TAN); **W** 001–000 | Georgakis (CYP); **L** 0s2–100s1 | 5 |
| **Marthe Gnacadja Avaro** | Women's +78 kg | Bye | Payet (SEY); **W** 100–000 | Andrews (NZL); **L** 0s3–100s2 | Bye | Wood (TTO); **W** 100–000 | 3rd place, bronze medalist(s) |

== Swimming ==
Gabon entered one female swimmer.

Women

| Athlete | Event | Heat | | Semifinal | | Final | |
| Athlete | Event | Time | Rank | Time | Rank | Time | Rank |
|---|---|---|---|---|---|---|---|
| Noélie Annette Lacour | 50 m butterfly | 28.18 | 24 | Did not advance | | | |
| Noélie Annette Lacour | 100 m butterfly | 1:05.23 | 24 | Did not advance | | | |
