= Judo at the 2022 Commonwealth Games – Women's +78 kg =

Judo competition

Judo – Women's +78 kg at the 2022 Commonwealth Games
- Venue: Coventry Arena
- Date: 3 August 2022
- Competitors: 10 from 10 nations

Medalists
gold medal	Sarah Adlington	Scotland
silver medal	Tulika Maan	India
bronze medal	Sydnee Andrews	New Zealand
bronze medal	Abigail Paduch	Australia

The women's +78 kg judo competitions at the 2022 Commonwealth Games in Birmingham, England took place on August 2 at the Coventry Arena. A total of 10 competitors from 10 nations took part.

== Results ==
The draw is as follows:

Round of 16
Lauryn Pulamoeng (BOT)	00 (yellow card)
Dianah Kana (KEN)	01
Tracy Durhone (MRI)	10
Hiruni Withana (SRI)	00

Quarter-finals
Sarah Adlington (SCO)	10
Dianah Kana (KEN)	00
Sarah Hawkes (NIR)	00
Abigail Paduch (AUS)	10
Tulika Maan (IND)	10
Tracy Durhone (MRI)	00
Sydnee Andrews (NZL)	10
Gabriella Wood (TTO)	00

Semi-finals
Sarah Adlington (SCO)	01
Abigail Paduch (AUS)	00 (yellow card)
Tulika Maan (IND)	10 (yellow card)
Sydnee Andrews (NZL)	01

Final
Sarah Adlington (SCO)	10
Tulika Maan (IND)	01

=== Repechages ===
Repechage
Dianah Kana (KEN)	00 (yellow card)
Sarah Hawkes (NIR)	10 (yellow card)
Tracy Durhone (MRI)	00
Gabriella Wood (TTO)	10

Bronze medal
Sarah Hawkes (NIR)	00 (yellow card)
Sydnee Andrews (NZL)	10
Gabriella Wood (TTO)	00
Abigail Paduch (AUS)	10
