= Athletics at the 2026 Commonwealth Games – Men's discus throw =

Men's discus throw at the 2026 Commonwealth Games
- Venue: Scotstoun Stadium, Glasgow
- Dates: 31 July (qualification); 1 August (final)
- Winning distance: 67.73 m

Medalists
| gold medal | Matthew Denny | Australia |
| silver medal | Fedrick Dacres | Jamaica |
| bronze medal | Lawrence Okoye | England |

The men's discus throw at the 2026 Commonwealth Games, as part of the athletics programme, took place in the Scotstoun Stadium from 31 July to 1 August 2026.

== Records ==
Prior to this competition, the existing world, Commonwealth and Commonwealth Games records were as follows:

Men's Discus throw
| World record | 75.56 m | Mykolas Alekna (LTU) | 13 Apr 2025 | Ramona, United States |
| Commonwealth record | 74.78 m | Matthew Denny (AUS) | 13 Apr 2025 | Ramona, United States |
| Games record | 68.20 m | Fedrick Dacres (JAM) | 13 Apr 2018 | Gold Coast, Australia |

== Schedule ==
The schedule is as follows:

| Date | Time | Round |
|---|---|---|
| 31 July 2026 | 10:00 | Qualification |
| 1 August 2026 | 10:00 | Final |

All times are British Summer Time (UTC+1)

== Results ==
=== Qualification ===
The qualification round was scheduled for the morning of 31 July 2026 but in the event was cancelled in favour of a straight final.

=== Final ===
The final was scheduled for 1 August 2026.

| Rank | Name | 1 | 2 | 3 | 4 | 5 | 6 | Result | Notes |
|---|---|---|---|---|---|---|---|---|---|
| 1st place, gold medalist(s) | Matthew Denny (AUS) | 66.87 | x | 67.32 | 67.73 | 65.77 | 67.26 | 67.73 | |
| 2nd place, silver medalist(s) | Fedrick Dacres (JAM) | 58.05 | 65.10 | 62.81 | x | 61.44 | x | 65.10 | |
| 3rd place, bronze medalist(s) | Lawrence Okoye (ENG) | x | 63.63 | x | x | x | 64.45 | 64.45 | |
| 4 | Alex Rose (SAM) | 61.53 | 63.32 | x | 61.33 | x | 58.20 | 63.32 | |
| 5 | Ralford Mullings (JAM) | x | x | 62.85 | x | x | x | 62.85 | |
| 6 | Iosif Papa (CYP) | 57.88 | 54.75 | 59.04 | x | x | 59.31 | 59.31 | |
| 7 | Nicholas Percy (SCO) | 52.69 | 54.06 | 57.05 | 58.00 | 58.28 | x | 58.28 | |
| 8 | Ryan Williams (NAM) | x | 52.19 | 54.95 | 47.40 | 54.84 | 55.37 | 55.37 | |
| 9 | Christopher Sophie (MRI) | 52.37 | 53.96 | x | | | | 53.96 | SB |
| 10 | Tayjo Oppong-Adjei (TCA) | x | 50.27 | x | | | | 50.27 | |
| 11 | Penisimani Ta'e'iloa (TGA) | x | 41.65 | x | | | | 41.65 | |
| | Irfan Shamsuddin (MAS) | x | x | x | | | | NM | |
| | Lucien Wangba (CMR) | x | x | x | | | | NM | |
