= Athletics at the 2026 Commonwealth Games – Men's triple jump =

Men's triple jump at the 2026 Commonwealth Games
- Venue: Scotstoun Stadium, Glasgow
- Dates: 30 July (qualification); 1 August (final)
- Winning distance: 16.72 m

Medalists
gold medal	Jordan Scott	Jamaica
silver medal	Praveen Chithravel	India
bronze medal	Selva Prabhu	India

The men's triple jump at the 2026 Commonwealth Games, as part of the athletics programme, took place in the Scotstoun Stadium from 30 July to 1 August 2026.

== Records ==
Prior to this competition, the existing world, Commonwealth and Commonwealth Games records were as follows:

Men's Triple jump
World record	18.29 m	Jonathan Edwards (GBR)	7 Aug 1995	Gothenburg, Sweden
Commonwealth record	18.29 m	Jonathan Edwards (ENG)	7 Aug 1995	Gothenburg, Sweden
Games record	17.86 m	Jonathan Edwards (ENG)	28 Jul 2002	Manchester England

== Schedule ==
The schedule was as follows:

Date	Time	Round
30 July 2026	10:00	Qualification
1 August 2026	19:00	Final

All times are British Summer Time (UTC+1)

== Results ==
=== Qualification ===
The qualification round was held on the morning of 30 July 2026.

Rank	Name				Result	Notes
1	Jordan Scott (JAM)	16.23	16.56	-	16.56	q
2	Praveen Chithravel (IND)	16.41	-	-	16.41	q
3	Selva Prabhu (IND)	x	x	16.26	16.26	q
4	Isaac Kirwa Yego (KEN)	15.37	14.66	16.14	16.14	q
5	Ethan Olivier (NZL)	16.11	16.09	-	16.11	q
6	Raymond Nkwemy Tchomfa (CMR)	15.78	16.06	-	16.06	q
7	Jah-Nhai Perinchief (BER)	14.33	16.01	-	16.01	q
8	Yeshan Kumara (SRI)	15.67	15.01	x	15.67	q
9	Kevin Kemboy (KEN)	15.55	x	x	15.55	q
10	Derick Gama (CMR)	15.52	x	15.46	15.52	q
11	Stafon Roach (GUY)	14.51	15.45	13.69	15.45	q
12	Gabriel Lee (SGP)	15.32	14.88	15.24	15.32	q
13	Jordan Aki-Sawyerr (SLE)	15.04	x	15.12	15.12	
14	Adel Cupidon (MRI)	x	14.93	x	14.93	
	Kelsey Daniel (TTO)				DNS	

=== Final ===
The final of the men's triple jump is scheduled for the morning of 1 August 2026.

Rank	Name	1	2	3	4	5	6	Result	Notes
1st place, gold medalist(s)	Jordan Scott (JAM)	16.52	x	16.50	16.72	x	x	16.72	
2nd place, silver medalist(s)	Praveen Chithravel (IND)	16.05	15.64	16.31	16.58	16.40	x	16.58	
3rd place, bronze medalist(s)	Selva Prabhu (IND)	15.87	16.17	16.43	x	16.52	16.08	16.52	
4	Ethan Olivier (NZL)	16.11	16.50	x	-	-	r	16.50	
5	Isaac Kirwa Yego (KEN)	16.13	14.89	16.31	x	15.80	16.24	16.31	SB
6	Yeshan Kumara (SRI)	15.53	16.01	15.59	15.88	15.96	15.86	16.01	
7	Gabriel Lee (SGP)	x	15.90	15.97	x	-	13.56	15.97	SB
8	Raymond Nkwemy Tchomfa (CMR)	15.54	15.75	15.97	14.73	x	15.86	15.97	
9	Derick Gama (CMR)	14.89	13.72	15.69				15.69	
10	Stafon Roach (GUY)	15.64	15.61	15.58				15.64	
	Jah-Nhai Perinchief (BER)	x	r					NM	
	Kevin Kemboy (KEN)							DNS	
