= Judo at the 2026 Commonwealth Games – Women's +78 kg =

Judo competition

Judo – Women's +78 kg at the 2026 Commonwealth Games
- Venue: SEC Centre, Glasgow
- Date: August 2 2026
- Competitors: 9 from 9 nations

Medalists
gold medal	Sydnee Andrews	New Zealand
silver medal	Richelle Soppi Mbella	Cameroon
bronze medal	Karra Hanna	Bahamas
bronze medal	Marthe Gnacadja Avaro	Gabon

The Women's +78 kg judo competitions at the 2026 Commonwealth Games in Glasgow, Scotland took place on August 2 at the SEC Centre. Nine judoka, representing nine nations, will contest the class.

== Seedings ==
The following judoka were seeded in advance of the draw:

Women's +78 kg
Seed	Judoka	Nation
1	Sydnee Andrews	New Zealand
2	Richelle Soppi Mbella	Cameroon
3	Karra Hanna	Bahamas
4	Marthe Gnacadja Avaro	Gabon
5	Amandah Payet	Seychelles
6	Essohanam Koro	Togo
7	~~Tulika Maan~~	India
8	Gabriella Wood	Trinidad and Tobago

== Results ==
=== Gold final path ===
Round of 16
Marie Loanne Durhone (MRI)	001
Sarah Adlington (SCO)	000 (yellow card)

Quarterfinals
Sydnee Andrews (NZL)	100
Marie Loanne Durhone (MRI)	000 (yellow card)
Marthe Gnacadja Avaro (GAB)	100
Amandah Payet (SEY)	000
Richelle Soppi Mbella (CMR)	100
Gabriella Wood (TTO)	000
Karra Hanna (BAH)	100
Essohanam Koro (TOG)	000

Semifinal
Sydnee Andrews (NZL)	100
Marthe Gnacadja Avaro (GAB)	000
Richelle Soppi Mbella (CMR)	101
Karra Hanna (BAH)	000 (yellow card)

Gold medal final
Sydnee Andrews (NZL)	100
Richelle Soppi Mbella (CMR)	000

=== Repechage/bronze medal path ===
Competitors who are eliminated in the quarter finals enter the repechage in the first round; the winners face the losing semi finalist from the opposite half of the draw for bronze.

Repechage
Marie Loanne Durhone (MRI)	100 (yellow card)
Amandah Payet (SEY)	000 (yellow card)
Gabriella Wood (TTO)	100
Essohanam Koro (TOG)	001

Bronze medal
Marie Loanne Durhone (MRI)	000
Karra Hanna (BAH)	100
Gabriella Wood (TTO)	000
Marthe Gnacadja Avaro (GAB)	100
