= Togo at the 2026 Commonwealth Games =

- Flag of Togo
- CG code: TOG
- CGA: Togolese National Olympic Committee
- Website: cnodutogo.org

in Glasgow, Scotland 23 July 2026 – 2 August 2026
- Competitors: 10 in 3 sports
- Flag bearer: Fayza Abdoukerim
- Baton bearer: Médard Nayo
- Medals: Gold 0 Silver 0 Bronze 0 Total 0

Commonwealth Games appearances (overview)
- 2026; 2030

Togo competed at the 2026 Commonwealth Games in Glasgow, Scotland. This marked Togo's debut at the games, after joining the Commonwealth of Nations in 2022.

The King's Baton relay stopped in Togo in November 2025. The Togolese team consisted of ten athletes (eight men and two women) competing in three sports.

Athlete Fayza Abdoukerim was the country's flagbearer during the opening ceremony. Meanwhile, fellow athlete Médard Nayo was the baton bearer during the opening ceremony.

== Competitors ==
The following is the list of number of competitors participating at the Games per sport/discipline.

Sport	Men	Women	Total
Athletics	4	1	5
Boxing	2	0	2
Judo	2	1	3
Total	8	2	10

== Athletics ==
Togo entered five athletes (four men and one woman). Noah Lawson was injured before the games and did not compete.

Key

Ranks given for track events are within the athlete's heat only.

- Q = Qualified for the next round
- q = Qualified for the next round as a fastest loser or, in field events, by position without achieving the qualifying target

Track events

Athlete	Event	Heat		Semifinal		Final	
Athlete	Event	Result	Rank	Result	Rank	Result	Rank
Komi Konu	Men's 100 m	11.10	7	Did not advance			
Kossi Nayo	Men's 100 m	10.30	4	Did not advance			
Kossi Nayo	Men's 200 m	21.00	3	Did not advance			
Makman Yoagbati	Men's 800 m	1:49.90	6	Did not advance			
Philippe Djo Petitjean	Men's 110 m hurdles	14.38	5	—N/a		Did not advance	
Komi Konu; Kossi Nayo; Philippe Djo Petitjean; Makman Yoagbati	Men's 4 × 100 m relay	41.95	6	—N/a		Did not advance	
Fayza Issaka Abdoukerim	Women's 100 m	12.01	4	Did not advance			

Field event

Athlete	Event	Qualification		Final	
Athlete	Event	Distance	Rank	Distance	Rank
Fayza Issaka Abdoukerim	Women's long jump	5.86	19	Did not advance	

== Boxing ==
Togo entered two male boxers.

Athlete	Event	Round of 32	Round of 16	Quarterfinals	Semifinals	Final	
Athlete	Event	Opposition Result	Opposition Result	Opposition Result	Opposition Result	Opposition Result	Rank
Charif Yaya	Men's 55 kg	Bye	Haoseb (NAM); L RSC	Did not advance			
Ramzi Salifou	Men's +90 kg	—N/a		Nigel Paul (TTO); L 0–5	Did not advance		

== Judo ==
Togo entered three judoka, two men and one woman.

Athlete	Event	Round of 32	Round of 16	Quarterfinals	Semifinals	Repechage	Final/BM	
Athlete	Event	Opposition Result	Opposition Result	Opposition Result	Opposition Result	Opposition Result	Opposition Result	Rank
Mederic Lawson	Men's 66 kg	Bye	Frascadore (CAN); L 000–100	Did not advance				
Mattheo Lawson	Men's 73 kg	Bye	Green (NIR); L 000s2–001s1	Did not advance				
Essohanam Koro	Women's +78 kg	—N/a	Bye	Hanna (BAH); L 000–100	Did not advance	Wood (TTO); L 000–100	Did not advance	7
