= Mauritius at the 2026 Commonwealth Games =

- Flag of Mauritius
- CG code: MRI
- CGA: Mauritius Olympic Committee
- Website: mauritiusolympic.org/en

in Glasgow, Scotland 23 July 2026 – 2 August 2026
- Competitors: 40 in 5 sports
- Flag bearer: Fabrice Valerie
- Baton bearer: Anishta Teeluck
- Medals Ranked 15th: Gold 1 Silver 2 Bronze 1 Total 4

Commonwealth Games appearances (overview)
- 1958; 1962; 1966; 1970; 1974; 1978; 1982; 1986; 1990; 1994; 1998; 2002; 2006; 2010; 2014; 2018; 2022; 2026; 2030

Mauritius competed at the 2026 Commonwealth Games in Glasgow, Scotland. This marked Mauritius' 17th participation at the games, after making its debut at the 1958 Commonwealth Games.

The Mauritian team consisted of 40 athletes competing in five sports. Boxer Fabrice Valerie was the country's flagbearer during the opening ceremony. Meanwhile, swimmer Anishta Teeluck was the baton bearer during the opening ceremony.

The Mauritiuan team won four medals (one gold, two silver and one bronze) to place 15th on the medal table.

== Competitors ==
The following is the list of number of competitors participating at the Games per sport/discipline.

Sport	Men	Women	Total
Athletics	11	7	18
Boxing	4	1	5
Judo	4	6	10
Swimming	3	2	5
Weightlifting	1	1	2
Total	22	18	40

== Medallists ==
The following competitors won medals at the games. In the by discipline sections below, medallists' names are bolded.

Medal	Name	Sport	Event	Date	Ref.
Gold	Rémi Feuillet	Judo	Men's 90 kg	1 August	
Silver	Noemi Alphonse	Athletics	Women's 1500 m T54	31 July	
Silver	Noemi Alphonse	Athletics	Women's 400 m T54	1 August	
Bronze	Merven Clair	Boxing	Men's 70 kg	31 July	

== Athletics ==
Mauritius named a team of eleven athletes and two para athletes for the Games.

Key

Ranks given for track events are within the athlete's heat only.

- **Q** = Qualified for the next round
- **q** = Qualified for the next round as a fastest loser or, in field events, by position without achieving the qualifying target

Track

Athlete	Event	Heat		Semifinal		Final	
Athlete	Event	Result	Rank	Result	Rank	Result	Rank
Noa Bibi	Men's 200 metres	20.86	3	Did not advance			
Orphée Topize	Men's 100 metres	10.38	2	Did not advance			
Joshan Vencatasamy	Men's 100 metres	10.60	4	Did not advance			
Joshan Vencatasamy	Men's 200 metres	21.49	3	Did not advance			
Jéremie Larararadeuse	Men's 110 metres hurdles	DNF		—		Did not advance	
Rachel Klopfenstein	Women's 800 metres	2:03.04	2 **Q**	2:00.48	5 **q**	2:03.81	8

Field

Athlete	Event	Qualification		Final	
Athlete	Event	Distance	Rank	Distance	Rank
Dezardin Prosper	Men's high jump	—N/a		2.00	11
Bérnard Baptiste	Men's shot put	15.91	11 **q**	16.27	11
Christopher Sophie	Men's discus throw	—N/a		53.96 **SB**	9
Adel Cupidon	Men's triple jump	14.93	14	Did not advance	
Juliane Clair	Women's hammer throw	52.53	14	Did not advance	

Para athletics

Athlete	Event	Qualification		Final	
Athlete	Event	Result	Rank	Result	Rank
Cedric Ravet	Men's 1500 metres (T54)	—N/a		3:20.96 **SB**	5
Eddy Capdor	Men's long jump (T20)	—N/a		5.93 **SB**	5
Louis Rabaye	Men's long jump (T20)	—N/a		5.71 **SB**	6
Marie Perrine	Women's 400 metres (T54)	58.59 **SB**	2 **Q**	1:00.43	6
**Noemi Alphonse**	Women's 400 metres (T54)	58.31 **SB**	1 **Q**	57.89 **SB**	2nd place, silver medalist(s)
**Noemi Alphonse**	Women's 1500 metres (T54)	—N/a		3:32.98 **SB**	2nd place, silver medalist(s)
Anais Angeline	Women's long jump (T38)	—N/a		4.71 **AR**	4

== Boxing ==
Mauritius entered five boxers, four men and one woman.

Athlete	Event	Round of 32	Round of 16	Quarterfinals	Semifinals	Final	
Athlete	Event	Opposition Result	Opposition Result	Opposition Result	Opposition Result	Opposition Result	Rank
Fabrice Valérie	Men's 55 kg	Canon (NRU); **W** 5–0	Mukuka (NZL); **L** 1–4	Did not advance			
Niven Chemben	Men's 60 kg	Bye	Harris-Allan (WAL); **L** 0–5	Did not advance			
Ziggy Agathe	Men's 65 kg	Damesi (RSA); **W** RSC	Paul (PNG); **W** 5–0	Khoahli (LES); **L** 0–5	Did not advance		
**Merven Clair**	Men's 70 kg	Bye	Taafaki (TUV); **W** 5–0	Nettey (GHA); **W** 5–0	Holley-Sotomi (WAL); **L** 0–5	Did not advance	3rd place, bronze medalist(s)
Marie Gabriel	Women's 54 kg	Bye	Holland (SAM); **W** 5–0	Mwape (ZAM); **L** 2–3	Did not advance		

== Judo ==
Mauritius entered a squad of ten judoka, four men and six women.

Men

Athlete	Event	Round of 32	Round of 16	Quarterfinals	Semifinals	Repechage	Final/BM	
Athlete	Event	Opposition Result	Opposition Result	Opposition Result	Opposition Result	Opposition Result	Opposition Result	Rank
Winsley Gangaya	60 kg	—N/a	Mwemwenikeaki (KIR); **W** 100–000	Ayre (ENG); **L** 000–101	Did not advance	Phuthego (BOT); **L** 000s1–010s2	Did not advance	7
Louis Flora	66 kg	Bye	Agbo (NGR); **L** 000–101	Did not advance				
**Rémi Feuillet**	90 kg	—N/a	Sande (ZAM); **W** 100–000s2	Naheu (CMR); **W** 001s2–0s2	Vojnikovich (AUS); **W** 100–000	Bye	Gaulin (CAN); **W** 001s1–000	1st place, gold medalist(s)
Lucas David	100 kg	—N/a	Kroussaniotakis (CYP); **L** 000–101	Did not advance				

Women

Athlete	Event	Round of 16	Quarterfinals	Semifinals	Repechage	Final/BM	
Athlete	Event	Opposition Result	Opposition Result	Opposition Result	Opposition Result	Opposition Result	Rank
Marie Thomas	48 kg	—N/a	Esposito (MLT); **L** 000s1–010	Did not advance	Babutsi (BOT); **L** 001s3–100s1	Did not advance	7
Marie Sylva Rioux	52 kg	Tayali (MAW); **W** 100–000	Keen (ENG); **L** 000s1–100	Did not advance	Baba Matia (CMR); **L** 000s3–100s2	Did not advance	7
Marie Begue	57 kg	Bye	Neirne (ENG); **L** 000–100	Did not advance	Delrieu (VAN); **W** 100–001	Breytenbach (RSA); **L** 000–100	5
Noemie Evenor	70 kg	Devall (WAL); **L** 000s1–102	Did not advance				
Lindsy Joseph	78 kg	Cherotich (KEN); **L** 011–100	Did not advance				
Marie Loanne Durhone	+78 kg	Adlington (SCO); **W** 001s2–000s1	Andrews (NZL); **L** 000s1–100	Did not advance	Payet (SEY); **W** 100s1–000s1	Hanna (BAH); **L** 000s2–100	5

== Swimming ==
Mauritius entered five swimmers (three men and two women).

Athlete	Event	Heat		Semifinal		Final	
Athlete	Event	Time	Rank	Time	Rank	Time	Rank
Gregory Anodin	Men's 50 m freestyle	23.90	32	Did not advance			
Gregory Anodin	Men's 100 m freestyle	52.36	37	Did not advance			
Bradley Vincent	Men's 50 m freestyle	22.77	12 **Q**	22.68	14	Did not advance	
Bradley Vincent	Men's 100 m freestyle	50.54	22	Did not advance			
Bradley Vincent	Men's 50 m butterfly	24.68	20	Did not advance			
Hans Li Ying Pin	Men's 50 m breaststroke	28.89	29	Did not advance			
Hans Li Ying Pin	Men's 100 m breaststroke	1:04.37	23	Did not advance			
Hans Li Ying Pin	Men's 200 m breaststroke	2:20.76	11	—N/a		Did not advance	
Alicia Kok Shun	Women's 50 m freestyle	27.27	34	Did not advance			
Alicia Kok Shun	Women's 100 m freestyle	1:01.59	48	Did not advance			
Alicia Kok Shun	Women's 50 m breaststroke	32.50	14 **Q**	33.13	14	Did not advance	
Alicia Kok Shun	Women's 100 m breaststroke	1:15.24	21	Did not advance			
Anishta Teeluck	Women's 50 m backstroke	30.92	25	Did not advance			
Anishta Teeluck	Women's 100 m backstroke	1:06.61	26	Did not advance			
Anishta Teeluck	Women's 200 m backstroke	2:21.43	11	—N/a		Did not advance	

== Weightlifting ==
Mauritius qualified two weightlifters (one per gender).

Athlete	Event	Snatch (kg)		Clean & Jerk (kg)		Total (kg)	Rank
Athlete	Event	Result	Rank	Result	Rank	Total (kg)	Rank
Dinesh Pandoo	Men's 88 kg	133	8	171	4	304	6
Ketty Lent	Women's 69 kg	97	4	120	4	217	4
