= Judo at the 2026 Commonwealth Games – Men's 90 kg =

Judo competition

Judo – Men's 90 kg at the 2026 Commonwealth Games
- Venue: SEC Centre, Glasgow
- Date: August 1 2026
- Competitors: 13

Medalists
gold medal	Rémi Feuillet	Mauritius
silver medal	Guillaume Gaulin	Canada
bronze medal	Jamal Petgrave	England
bronze medal	Scott Cusack	Scotland

The Men's 90 kg judo competitions at the 2026 Commonwealth Games in Glasgow, Scotland took on August 1 at the SEC Centre. Thirteen judoka will take part in this class.

== Seedings ==
The following judoka were seeded in advance of the draw:

90
Seed	Judoka	Nation
1	Danny Vojnikovich	Australia
2	Noah Walliss	New Zealand
3	Elliott Connolly	New Zealand
4	Rémi Feuillet	Mauritius
5	Vladimir Ngueya Naheu	Cameroon
6	Guillaume Gaulin	Canada
7	Thomas-Laszlo Breytenbach	South Africa
8	Jamal Petgrave	England

== Results ==
=== Gold final path ===
Round of 16
Jamal Petgrave (ENG)	100
Bradley Morris-McKenzie (GIB)	000
Rémi Feuillet (MRI)	100
Andrew Sande (ZAM)	000
Vladimir Ngueya Naheu (CMR)	100
Frederick Harris (SLE)	000
Thomas-Laszlo Breytenbach (RSA)	000
Scott Cusack (SCO)	100
Elliott Connolly (NZL)	000
Karanjit Singh Maan (IND)	100 (yellow card)
Guillaume Gaulin (CAN)	101
Nantenaina Finesse (SEY)	000

Quarterfinals
Danny Vojnikovich (AUS)	002
Jamal Petgrave (ENG)	001 (yellow card)
Rémi Feuillet (MRI)	001
Vladimir Ngueya Naheu (CMR)	000
Noah Walliss (NZL)	101 (yellow card)
Scott Cusack (SCO)	000 (yellow card)
Karanjit Singh Maan (IND)	000 (yellow card)
Guillaume Gaulin (CAN)	110

Semifinal
Danny Vojnikovich (AUS)	000
Rémi Feuillet (MRI)	100
Noah Walliss (NZL)	002 (yellow card)
Guillaume Gaulin (CAN)	011

Gold medal final
Rémi Feuillet (MRI)	001 (yellow card)
Guillaume Gaulin (CAN)	000

=== Repechage/bronze medal path ===
Competitors who were eliminated between the quarter finals and the final enter the repechage for a bronze medal.

Repechage
Jamal Petgrave (ENG)	100
Vladimir Ngueya Naheu (CMR)	000
Scott Cusack (SCO)	100
Karanjit Singh Maan (IND)	000

Bronze medal
Jamal Petgrave (ENG)	012 (yellow card)
Noah Walliss (NZL)	000 (yellow card)
Scott Cusack (SCO)	100
Danny Vojnikovich (AUS)	000
