= Abigail Paduch =

Australian judoka

Personal information
- Born: 16 January 2000 (age 26) Figtree, Wollongong, New South Wales, Australia
- Occupation: Judoka
- Education: [[Sydney Distance Education High School]]

Sport
- Sport: Judo
- Weight class: -78 & +78 kg
- Club: Zenbu Judo Club
- Coached by: Morgan Endicott-Davies
Medal record
Commonwealth Games
Bronze medal – third place	2022 Birmingham	+78 kg

Profile at external databases
- IJF: 22254
- JudoInside.com: 95537

Abigail Paduch (born 16 January 2000) is an Australian judoka.

Paduch was born in Figtree, New South Wales on 16 January 2000. She first tried judo during her first year attending Oak Flats High School. She joined the New South Wales junior squad within a month and won her first national title within three months. She returned to judo in 2018 after taking a break due to a spinal injury. She received a tier 3 scholarship with 2021 Sport Australia Hall of Fame Scholarship and Mentoring Program.

She won Australia's first Asia-Oceania Championship title in 2019 in the Woman's -78 kg and also won a bronze medal at the 2022 Commonwealth Games in the Women's +78 kg event.

She has also completed an exercise science honours thesis at the Australian Catholic University and received a university blue and the Executive Dean's Award for Academic Excellence
