= Elliot Jones (sprinter) =

British sprinter (born 2001)

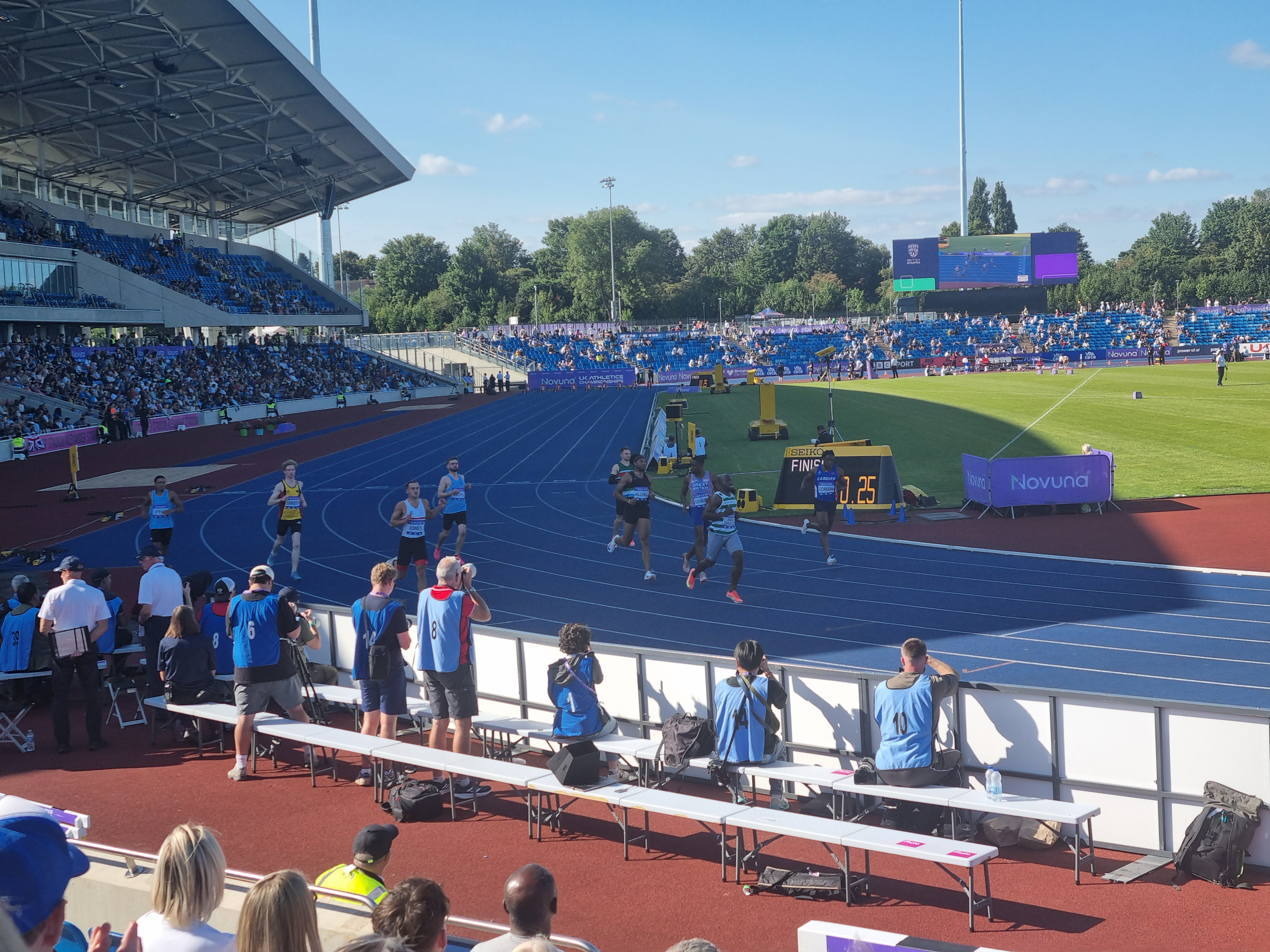
- Jones at the 2025 UK Championships

Personal information
- Nationality: British (English)
- Born: 21 September 1997 (age 28) Wigan, England

Sport
- Sport: Athletics
- Event: Sprint
- Coached by: Leon Baptiste

Achievements and titles
- Personal bests: 60m: 6.71 (2024); 100m: 10.04 (2025); 200m: 20.71 (2023)

Elliot Jones (born 21 September 1997)is a British sprinter. He made his debut representing Great Britain at the 2026 World Athletics Relays.

== Biography ==
Born in Wigan, he grew-up living in Parbold, Lancashire, and showed aptitude for sprinting from a young age, being the Lancashire Schools County Champion in 2016. He was educated at Parbold Douglas CoE Primary School, Bishop Rawstorne Academy and Runshaw College and runs at club level for Liverpool Pembroke and Sefton AC under coach Ray Twentyman.

Jones attended University of Warwick and represented the university, under coach Ronnie Williams. He completed a masters at Loughborough University and has remained in the town, trained by Commonwealth Games Gold medal winning sprinter Leon Baptiste.

In August 2025, Jones was a finalist in the 100 metres, placing fifth overall, at the 2025 UK Athletics Championships in Birmingham, running 10.19 seconds (+2.2 m/s) in the final. Later that month, he lowered his 100 m personal best to 10.04 seconds (+1.9) while competing in Stafford, London. With the time, he finished 2025 as the fifth ranked British male at the distance, and also recorded a wind-assisted time of 9.93 seconds during the season.

Jones was named in the British team for the 2026 World Athletics Relays in Gaborone, Botswana, and made his international debut representing Great Britain in the mixed 4 x 100 metres relay. On 4 June 2026, at the Liese Prokop Memorial in St. Pölten, Jones won the 100 metres in 10.09 seconds (-0.3). On 20 June, Jones qualified for the 100 metres final at the 2026 UK Athletics Championships, again placing fifth overall. He was selected to represent England at the 2026 Commonwealth Games in Glasgow, reaching the semi-finals of the 100 metres with a run of 10.07 seconds. He also ran in the men's 4 × 100 m relay. Jones was included in the Great Britain relay pool for the 2026 World Athletics Ultimate Championship.

== Personal life ==
Away from athletics, he works in the venue operations team at UEFA. A keen football fan, he is a supporter of Wigan Athletic. His sister Flossie Jones is a midfielder for the club and his father, Ed, was also a media executive at the club.
