= Turks and Caicos Islands at the 2026 Commonwealth Games =

- Flag of the Turks and Caicos Islands
- CG code: TCA
- CGA: Turks and Caicos Islands Commonwealth Games Association

in Glasgow, Scotland 23 July 2026 – 2 August 2026
- Competitors: 9 in 2 sports
- Flag bearer: Lerano Missick
- Baton bearer: Arleigha Hall
- Medals: Gold 0 Silver 0 Bronze 0 Total 0

Commonwealth Games appearances (overview)
- 1978; 1982–1994; 1998; 2002; 2006; 2010; 2014; 2018; 2022; 2026; 2030

The Turks and Caicos Islands competed at the 2026 Commonwealth Games in Glasgow, Scotland. This marked The Turks and Caicos Islands' 9th participation at the games, after making its debut at the 1978 Commonwealth Games.

The King's Baton relay stopped in the Islands in June 2025. The Turks and Caicos Islands team competed in two sports: athletics and swimming. The Turks and Caicos Islands team consisted of nine athletes (seven men and two women).

Athlete Lerano Missick was the country's flagbearer during the opening ceremony. Meanwhile, swimmer Arleigha Hall was the baton bearer during the opening ceremony.

== Competitors ==
The following is the list of number of competitors participating at the Games per sport/discipline.

Sport	Men	Women	Total
Athletics	6	1	7
Swimming	1	1	2
Total	7	2	9

== Athletics ==
The Turks and Caicos Islands entered seven athletes (six men and one woman).

Key

Ranks given for track events are within the athlete's heat only.

- Q = Qualified for the next round
- q = Qualified for the next round as a fastest loser or, in field events, by position without achieving the qualifying target

Track events

Athlete	Event	Heat		Semifinal		Final	
Athlete	Event	Result	Rank	Result	Rank	Result	Rank
Ronaldo Registre	Men's 100 m	10.76	6	Did not advance			
Markey Zephirin	Men's 100 m	11.00	6	Did not advance			
Lerano Missick	Men's 200 m	DNS					
Rayvon Black	Men's 400 m	47.80	5	Did not advance			
Lerano Missick	Men's 400 m	48.83	6	Did not advance			
Eliasu Ali Jr	Men's 800 m	1:59.21	7	Did not advance			
Rayvon Black; Lerano Missick; Ronaldo Registre; Markey Zephirin	Men's 4 × 100 m relay	41.21 SB	6	—N/a		Did not advance	
Tanesia Sylvina Gardiner	Women's 800 m	2:24.28	7	Did not advance			

Field event

Athlete	Event	Final	
Athlete	Event	Distance	Rank
Tayjo Oppong-Adjei	Men's discus throw	50.27	10

== Swimming ==
The Turks and Caicos Islands entered two swimmers.

Athlete	Event	Heat		Semifinal		Final	
Athlete	Event	Time	Rank	Time	Rank	Time	Rank
Ethan Gardiner	Men's 50 m freestyle	26.08	56	Did not advance			
Ethan Gardiner	Men's 50 m breaststroke	34.78	52	Did not advance			
Arleigha Hall	Women's 50 m freestyle	29.73	60	Did not advance			
Arleigha Hall	Women's 50 m backstroke	34.81	39	Did not advance			
