= Omari Lewis =

Trinidad and Tobago athlete (born 2001)

Personal information
- Nationality: Trinidad and Tobago
- Born: 26 November 2001 (age 24)

Sport
- Sport: Athletics
- Event: Sprint

Achievements and titles
- Personal bests: 60m: 6.58 (2026); 100m: 10.07 (2026); 200m: 20.53 (2025)

Omari Lewis (born 26 November 2001) is a sprinter from Trinidad and Tobago. He won the national championships over 100 metres in 2025 and 2026.

== Biography ==
Lewis competed as a member of Concorde Athletics Club in Trinidad and Tobago, and later attended Liberty University in the United States. In 2023, he won the 100 metres at the ASUN Outdoor Championships in Jacksonville, Florida. He competed for Trinidad and Tobago at the 2023 World Athletics Championships in Budapest.

In April 2024, he lowered his personal best for the 100 metres to 10.08 seconds while competing in Virginia. The following month, he ran a wind-assisted 9.88 seconds at the Conference USA Championships, in Texas. In May 2025, Lewis ran a personal best 10.07 seconds for the 100 metres at the East Coast Relays in Jacksonville. In August 2025, Lewis won the Trinidad and Tobago Athletics Championships over 100 metres for the first time. He represented Trinidad and Tobago at the 2025 NACAC Championships.

Lewis transferred to competed for Auburn University ahead of the 2026 season. Lewis reached the final of the 100 metres at the 2026 NCAA Outdoor Championships, where he placed eighth overall with 10.08 seconds.

On 19 June, he retained his national title at the 2026 Trinidad and Tobago Championships, winning over 100 metres, in 10.08 seconds. In July 2026, Lewis won the 100 metres in 10.10 seconds at the Barbados Grand Prix at the Usain Bolt Sports Complex, in Bridgetown. He competed in the 100 metres at the 2026 Commonwealth Games in Glasgow, Scotland, reaching the semi-finals.

== Personal life ==
His sister Akilah Lewis also competes as a sprinter.
