= Jamal Petgrave =

British judoka

Personal information
- Nationality: British (English)
- Born: 14 May 1997 (age 29) Carshalton, London
- Occupation: Judoka

Sport
- Sport: Judo
- Weight class: ‍–‍90 kg
- Club: Westcroft Judo Club

Achievements and titles
- World Champ.: R64 (2023, 2024)
- European Champ.: R32 (2018, 2023, 2024)
- Commonwealth Games: (gold) (2022)
Medal record
Men's judo
Representing Great Britain
IJF Grand Prix
Silver medal – second place	2022 Perth	‍–‍90 kg
Bronze medal – third place	2023 Perth	‍–‍90 kg
European U23 Championships
Silver medal – second place	2018 Győr	‍–‍90 kg
European Junior Championships
Bronze medal – third place	2017 Maribor	‍–‍90 kg
Representing England
Commonwealth Games
Gold medal – first place	2022 Birmingham	‍–‍90 kg
Bronze medal – third place	2026 Glasgow	‍–‍90 kg

Profile at external databases
- IJF: 20998
- JudoInside.com: 81808
- Updated on 2 August 2026

Jamal Petgrave (born 14 May 1997) is a British international judoka. He has represented England at the Commonwealth Games and won a gold medal.

== Biography ==
Petgrave won three British middleweight titles having claimed the national crown at the British Judo Championships in 2017, 2019, and 2021. In 2018, he won silver at the U23 European Championships.

In 2022, he was selected for the 2022 Commonwealth Games in Birmingham where he competed in the men's 90 kg, reaching the final and winning the gold medal.

In December 2024, Petgrave won a fourth middleweight title at the British Judo Championships.
