= Richelle Soppi Mbella =

Cameroonian judoka (born 1990)

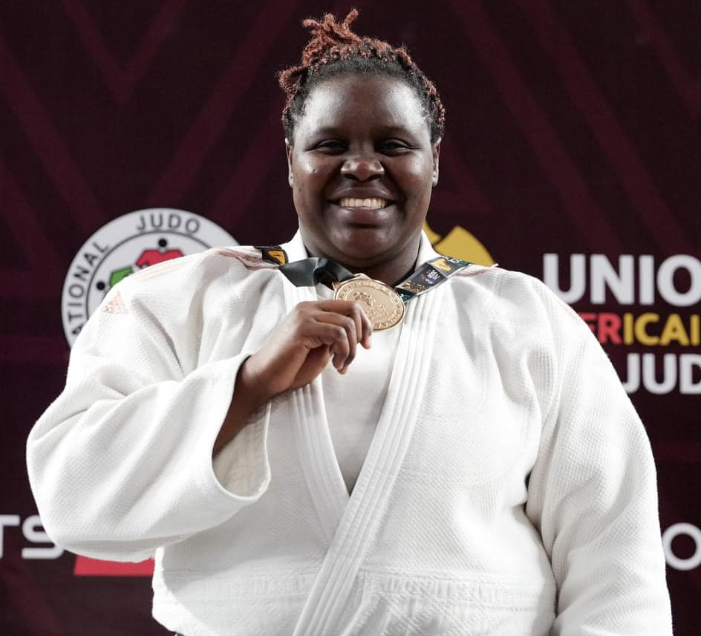

Personal information
- Full name: Richelle Anita Soppi Mbella
- Born: 4 January 1990 (age 36)
- Occupation: Judoka

Sport
- Country: Cameroon
- Sport: Judo
- Weight class: +78 kg

Achievements and titles
- Olympic Games: R32 (2024)
- World Champ.: R32 (2024)
- African Champ.: (gold) (2024)
- Commonwealth Games: (silver) (2026)
Medal record
Women's judo
Representing Cameroon
African Championships
Gold medal – first place	2024 Cairo	+78 kg
Silver medal – second place	2023 Casablanca	+78 kg
Commonwealth Games
Silver medal – second place	2026 Glasgow	+78 kg

Profile at external databases
- IJF: 42155
- JudoInside.com: 117791
- Updated on 3 August 2026

Richelle Anita Soppi Mbella (born 4 January 1990) is a Cameroonian professional judoka who competes in the +78 kg category. She was born in Ndoungué.

== International career ==
Mbella has represented Cameroon in international competitions such as the African Championships and the African Games. At the 2024 Summer Olympics she was named flag-bearer for Cameroon. At the 2023 African Championships, she won the silver medal in the +78 kg category. At the 2024 African Senior Championships, she won a gold medal in the +78 kg category. At the 2024 African Open (Abidjan, Marrakech, Luanda), she won a gold medal in the +78 kg category., and at the 2024 African Games, she won a bronze medal in the mixed team event.
