= Sydnee Andrews =

New Zealand judoka (born 2002)

Personal information
- Born: 12 December 2002 (age 23) Gisborne, New Zealand
- Occupation: Judoka

Sport
- Country: New Zealand
- Sport: Judo
- Weight class: +78 kg

Achievements and titles
- Olympic Games: R32 (2024)
- World Champ.: R32 (2024, 2025, 2026)
- Pan American Champ.: (silver) (2025)
- Commonwealth Games: (gold) (2026)
Medal record
Women's judo
Representing New Zealand
Pan American-Oceania Championships
Silver medal – second place	2025 Santiago	+78 kg
Bronze medal – third place	2023 Calgary	+78 kg
IJF Grand Prix
Gold medal – first place	2025 Gold Coast	+78 kg
Silver medal – second place	2022 Perth	+78 kg
Silver medal – second place	2026 Zagreb	+78 kg
Bronze medal – third place	2023 Zagreb	+78 kg
Commonwealth Games
Gold medal – first place	2026 Glasgow	+78 kg
Bronze medal – third place	2022 Birmingham	+78 kg

Profile at external databases
- IJF: 41132
- JudoInside.com: 116687
- Updated on 15 November 2026

Sydnee Andrews (born 12 December 2002) is a New Zealand judoka. She won a bronze medal at the 2022 Commonwealth Games, in women's +78 kg.

== Biography ==
Andrews was born and raised in Gisborne, New Zealand and started judo at the age of 5. In 2022 she won a bronze medal at the Prague Open, and placed fifth at the Tunis Open. Andrews represented New Zealand at the 2022 Commonwealth Games.

She has been chosen to represent New Zealand at the 2024 Olympic Games in Paris.

Andrews moved to the United Kingdom, and is based at the Camberley Judo Club.
