= 2026 Commonwealth Games =

Multi-sport event in Glasgow, Scotland

XXIII Commonwealth Games
- Host: Glasgow, Scotland
- Motto: Sport is Just the Beginning
- Nations: 74 Commonwealth teams
- Athletes: 2,715
- Events: 215 in 10 sports
- Opening: 23 July 2026
- Closing: 2 August 2026
- Opened by: Charles III
- Closed by: Prince Edward, Duke of Edinburgh
- Athlete's Oath: Paul Foster; Robyn Love
- King's Baton Final Runners: Kieron Achara, Hannah Miley and Neil Fachie
- Main venue: The Hydro
- Website: Glasgow2026.com

The 2026 Commonwealth Games, officially known as the XXIII Commonwealth Games and commonly known as Glasgow 2026, was a multi-sport event held from 23 July to 2 August 2026 in Glasgow, the largest city in Scotland, for members of the Commonwealth of Nations. These were the fourth Commonwealth Games to be hosted in Scotland, following the 1970 and 1986 games in Edinburgh, and the 2014 Games in Glasgow. The 2026 Commonwealth Games were the first to be held since the death of Queen Elizabeth II and the accession of King Charles III as Head of the Commonwealth, and the first edition since Donald Rukare became president of Commonwealth Sport.

For some time, the Games were without a host after the bid from Victoria, Australia for the 2026 Commonwealth Games was withdrawn, Victoria having initially been announced as the host in April 2022. On 18 July 2023, the Victorian state government cancelled its plans due to escalating cost projections. The city of Gold Coast, Queensland, briefly offered to co-host the event but later withdrew for similar reasons. With no host, there was a risk that the Games might be postponed to 2027 or cancelled entirely.

On 11 August 2024, reports surfaced that Glasgow had reached an agreement to take over the hosting rights, but the next day it was clarified that talks were ongoing with no final agreement or imminent announcement. Commonwealth Games Scotland proposed a scaled-back version of the event, featuring 10 to 13 sports and using existing infrastructure, with £100 million in funding from the Commonwealth Games Federation and an additional £30 to 50 million from commercial sources, ensuring no significant public funds would be required. A further update on 30 August 2024 confirmed that the Games would be primarily funded by AU$200 million, secured as compensation from the Victorian government following their withdrawal. In September 2024, the Scottish Government agreed to host the games with financial backing from Commonwealth Games Australia. The scaled-down and low-cost Games featured 10 sports taking place over seven venues and no athletes' village.

Australia topped the medal table for the third consecutive Commonwealth Games, with 70 gold and 171 total medals. England placed second with 29 gold and 110 total medals, while Canada finished third with 19 gold and 62 total medals. The host nation, Scotland, finished fifth behind India, each with 13 gold medals and 39 total medals. Gabon, Rwanda and Tuvalu won their first-ever Commonwealth medals, with Dominica winning their first-ever gold medal.

== Host selection ==
=== First selection ===
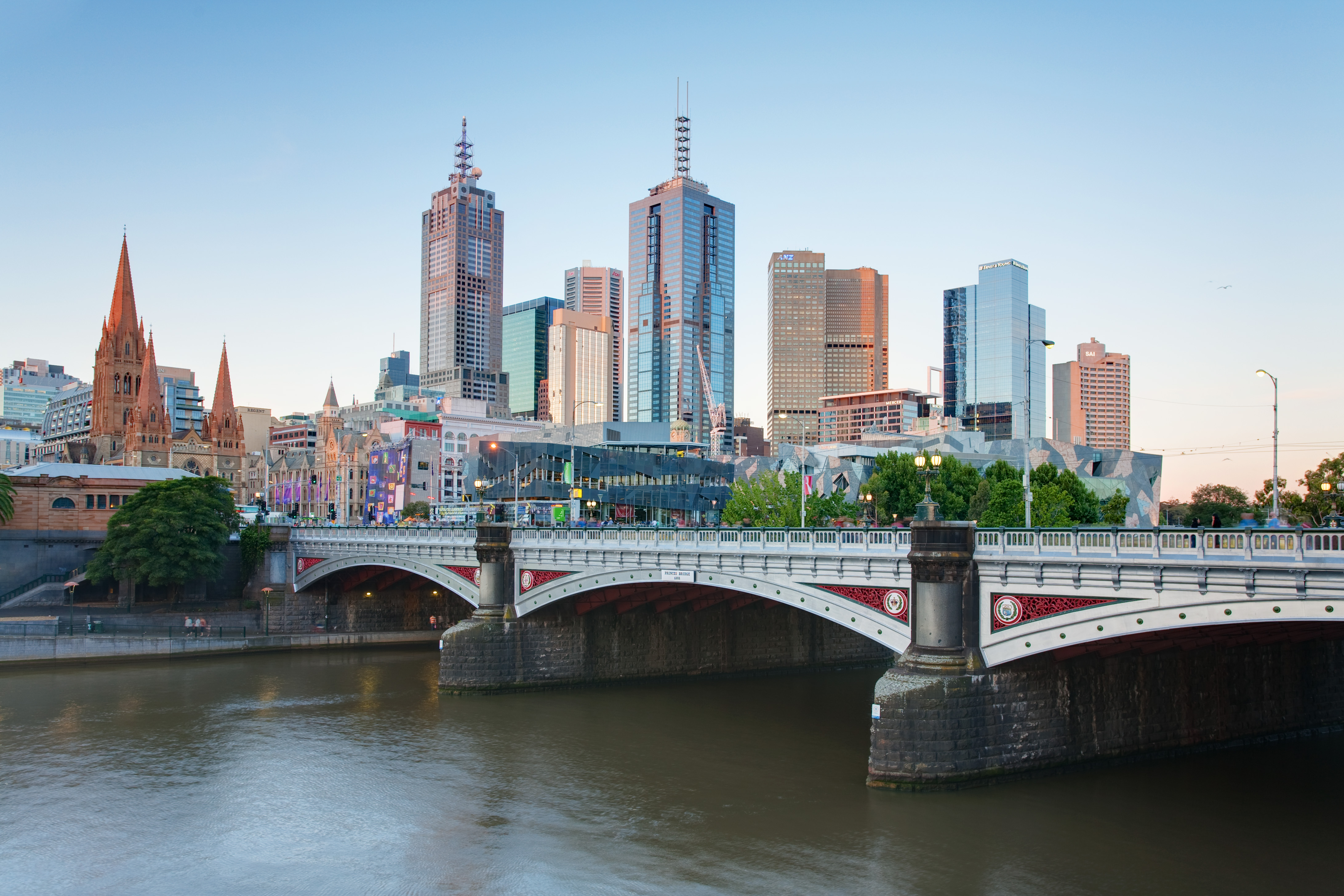
The Australian state of Victoria was initially appointed host.

During the CGF General Assembly on 31 March 2017 in Gold Coast, after the troubled 2022 Commonwealth Games host city bid process, the executive board announced that it had planned to award both 2026 and 2030 Commonwealth Games simultaneously at the CGF General Assembly scheduled for Kigali, Rwanda in September 2019. A new model called CGF Partnerships (CGFP) was implemented which aimed to give stronger support to the associations and cities that show interest in hosting future Games and enhance the overall value of the event. This is similar to the process used by the International Olympic Committee (IOC) since 2017.

In 2015, the South African city of Durban originally won the rights to host the 2022 Commonwealth Games, but was stripped of these rights in 2017 due to financial concerns. As a result, Birmingham moved up its planned Games from 2026 to 2022. This left the 2026 Games without a host and bids from Kuala Lumpur, Cardiff, Calgary, Edmonton and Adelaide were all withdrawn due to concerns over costs, with a hosting decision not made by the Commonwealth Games Federation between 2019 and 2022.

In January 2022, the Victorian State Government announced it was giving serious consideration to a late request from the CGF to host the Games. On 16 February 2022, Premier of Victoria Daniel Andrews confirmed that the state was in exclusive negotiations with the CGF to host the Games. It was stated that if successful in hosting the Games a second time, a Victorian bid would aim to emphasise the state's regional centres—such as Geelong, Ballarat and Bendigo—as opposed to being predominantly Melbourne-based, such as in 2006. Bendigo had previously hosted the 2004 Commonwealth Youth Games. Acceptance of the bid would likely also be conditional upon agreement on ways to control costs, such as housing athletes and officials in hotels rather than a dedicated village. This bid was confirmed as successful on 12 April 2022.

On 18 July 2023, the state government intended to cancel hosting the 2026 Games in Victoria. Fifteen months after agreeing to host the Games, Premier Daniel Andrews said the cost had escalated to an estimated A$6–7 billion, double the estimated economic benefits for the state, and the government could not justify the expense. The state said it would terminate its host agreement with the Commonwealth Games Federation and seek a settlement of the contract. The withdrawal prompted a new search for a host for the 2026 Games.

2026 Commonwealth Games bidding results
City / region	Nation	Votes
Victoria	Australia	Unanimous (2022); Withdrew (2023)

=== Second selection ===
==== Initial interest ====
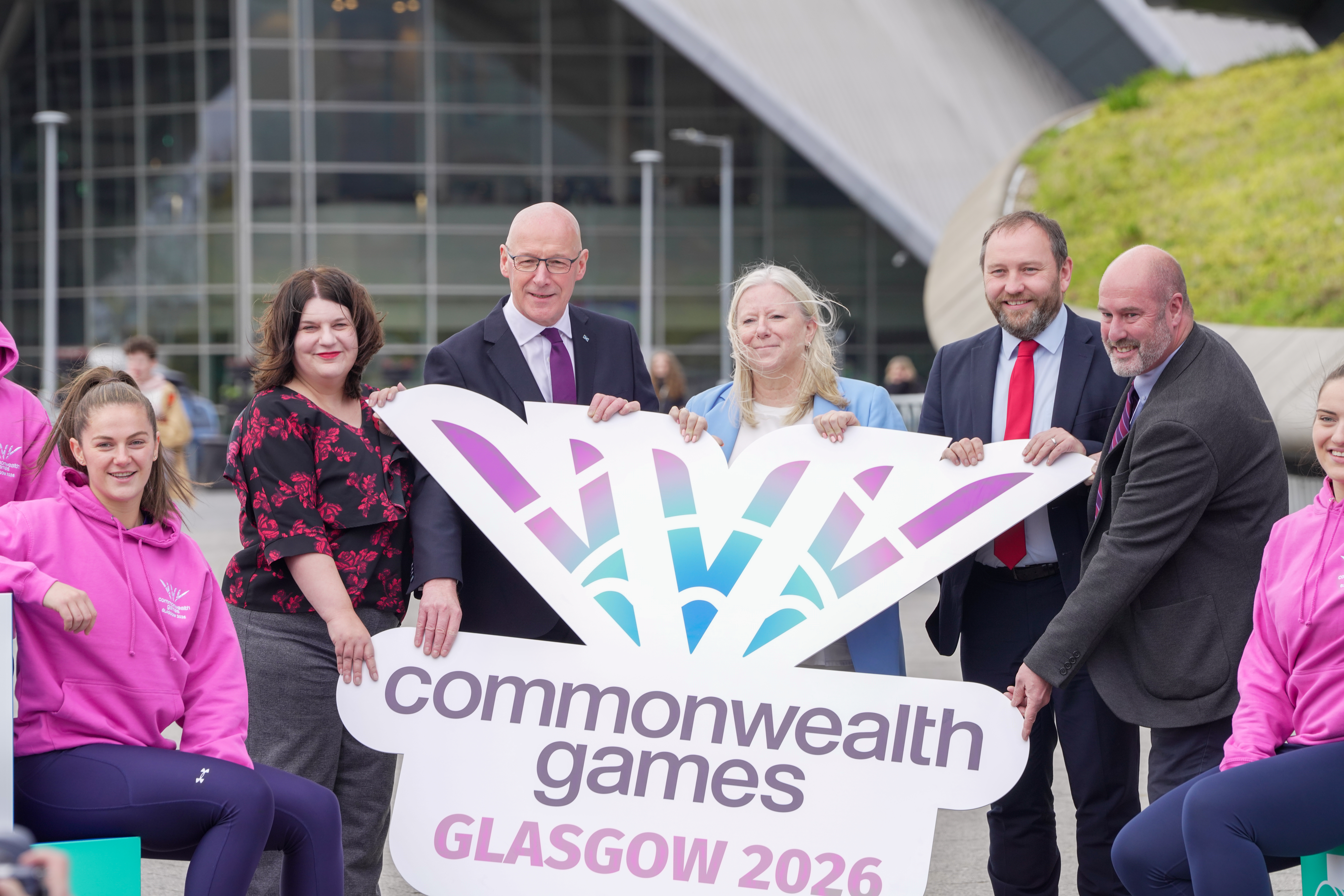
The First Minister of Scotland, John Swinney, formally launches the 2026 Commonwealth Games, October 2024.

The Mayor of London Sadiq Khan subsequently said he was "ready" to support the London bid to replace Victoria as the host. The First Minister of Scotland Humza Yousaf also stated that he was "willing to consider proposals" for Scotland to host at least some of the events at the Games.

On 4 December 2023, the Gold Coast ruled itself out of hosting the games. On the same day, the British government confirmed that there would be "no UK rescue" for the games and that they would not be hosted in the United Kingdom, citing that there was no financial appetite or any preliminary planning in place to allow another British city to intervene again after Birmingham 2022.

On 11 March 2024, the Olympic Council of Malaysia revealed that the Commonwealth Games Federation (CGF) had offered Malaysia approximately £100 million to host the 2026 Commonwealth Games on a smaller scale than initially planned, with discussions ongoing. However, on 22 March 2024, the Malaysian Cabinet declined the offer, stating that the £100 million would be insufficient to cover the event's costs. Furthermore, the Federal Government was unwilling to use taxpayers' money to fund the games, especially given the risk of a scheduling clash with the 2027 SEA Games, also set to be held in Malaysia.

On 14 March 2024, the Singapore National Olympic Council (SNOC), Sport Singapore (SportSG), and Commonwealth Games Singapore (CGS) announced they were exploring the feasibility of hosting the games, including the possibility of a joint proposal with Malaysia to reduce expenses. However, on 3 April 2024, CGS and SportSG confirmed that Singapore would not submit a bid.

On 8 April 2024, the CGF indicated that a new host for the 2026 Games might be announced the following month, and on 9 April 2024, Ghana's Minister for Youth and Sports, Mustapha Ussif, expressed interest in hosting the event following Accra's successful hosting of the 2023 African Games in March 2024.

==== Scotland bid ====
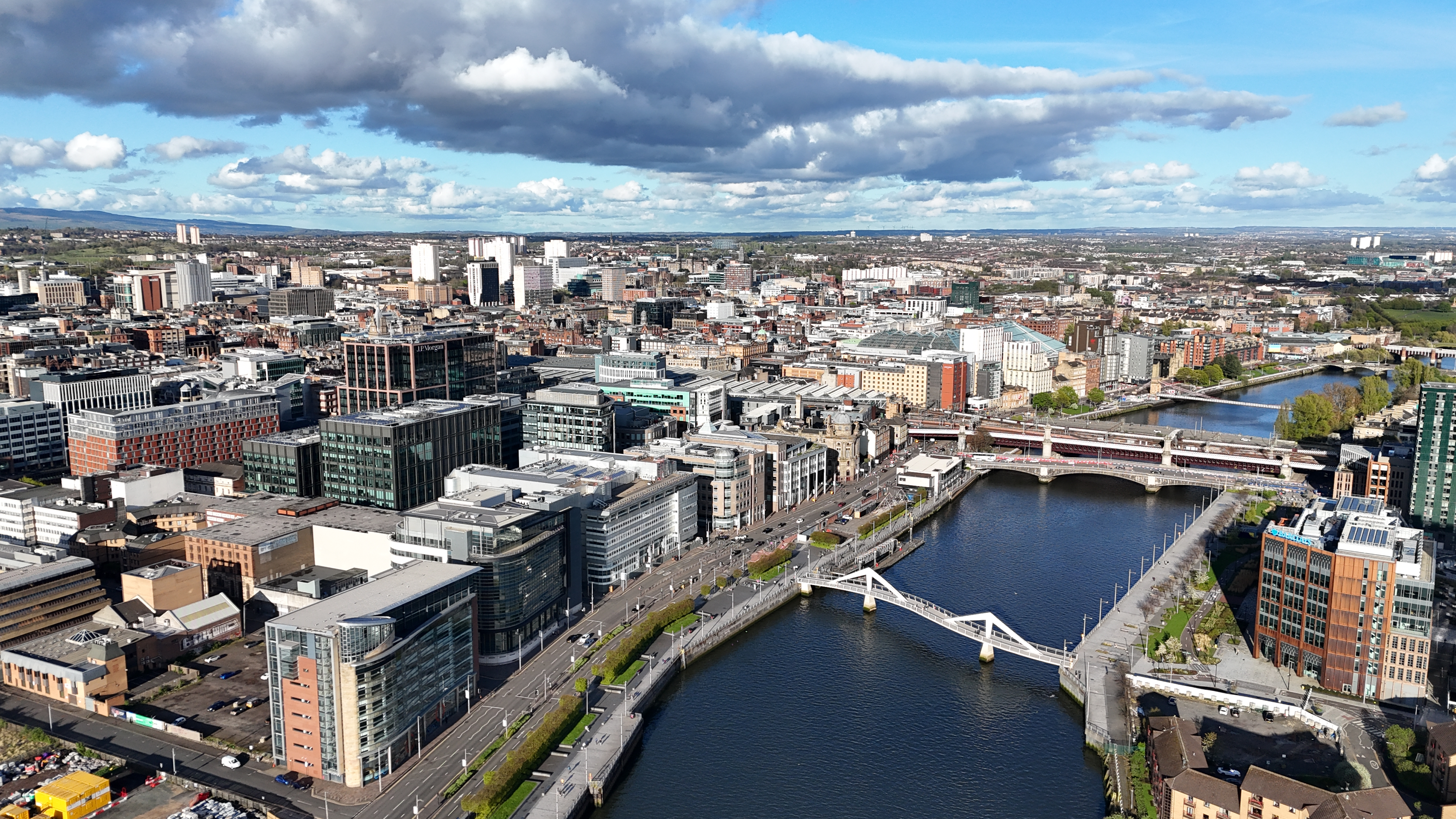
Glasgow was considered as the "last possibility" to host the 2026 Games after Victoria pulled out.

On 11 April 2024, it was announced that Glasgow was considered as a "last possibility" to host the 2026 Games in the event that no other host was forthcoming. It was reported that the Games would be on a smaller scale and could reuse venues from the 2014 Commonwealth Games. Accommodation for the athletes would comprise hotels, and possibly the student residences of Glasgow Caledonian University and University of Glasgow. Furthermore, the cost of the Games would be covered fully by the Commonwealth Games Federation and their corporate sponsors. Discussions were ongoing between Commonwealth Games Scotland, the Scottish Government and EventScotland: a confirmed bid was expected by the end of the month, but the bid documents were in fact not submitted at that time. On 25 July 2024, the BBC reported that a decision would be made in August.

On 11 August 2024, it was speculated that an agreement had been reached for Glasgow to take over the hosting rights of the Games. A statement from the Commonwealth Games Council for Scotland issued on 30 August 2024, suggested a compact and low scale Games with 10 sports across four venues including the Scotstoun Stadium and the Tollcross International Swimming Centre.

On 17 September 2024, it was announced that the Scottish Government had agreed to host the Games with compensation from Victoria.

2026 Commonwealth Games bidding results
City / region	Nation	Votes
Glasgow	Scotland	Unanimous

== Venues ==
The following venues were used for the 2026 Commonwealth Games:

Venue	Events	Capacity	Status
The Hydro	Ceremonies	12,306	Existing
The Hydro	Netball	12,306	Existing
SEC Centre	3x3 basketball	TBD	Existing with temporary stands
SEC Centre	Bowls	TBD	Existing with temporary stands
SEC Centre	Boxing	TBD	Existing with temporary stands
SEC Centre	Judo	TBD	Existing with temporary stands
SEC Armadillo	Weightlifting	3,000	Existing
Scotstoun Stadium	Athletics	10,000-11,000	Existing, renovated
Tollcross International Swimming Centre	Swimming	2,000	Existing
Commonwealth Arena	Artistic gymnastics	5,000	Existing
Sir Chris Hoy Velodrome	Track cycling	2,000	Existing

=== Gallery of venues ===
Scotstoun Stadium

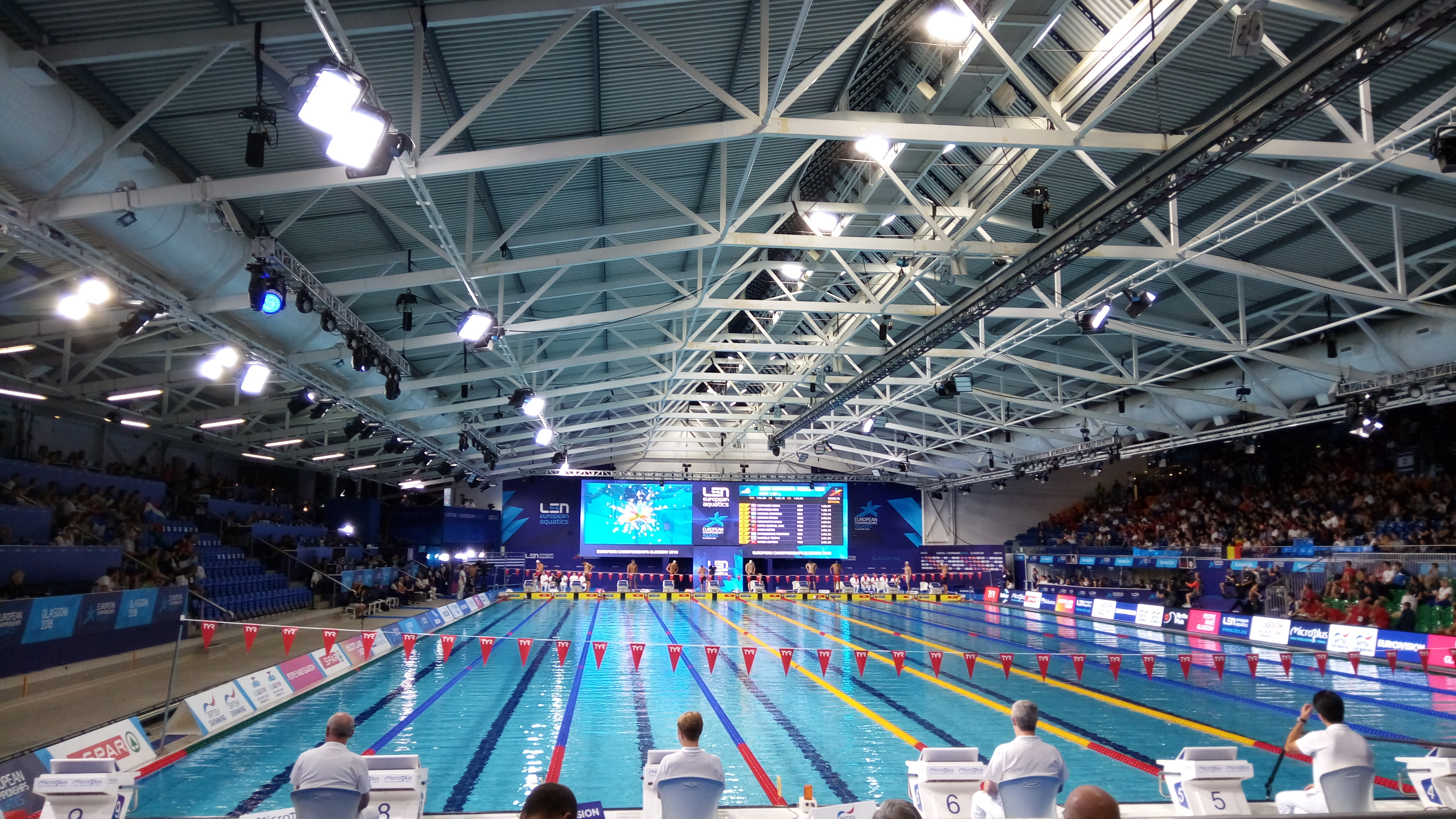
Tollcross International Swimming Centre

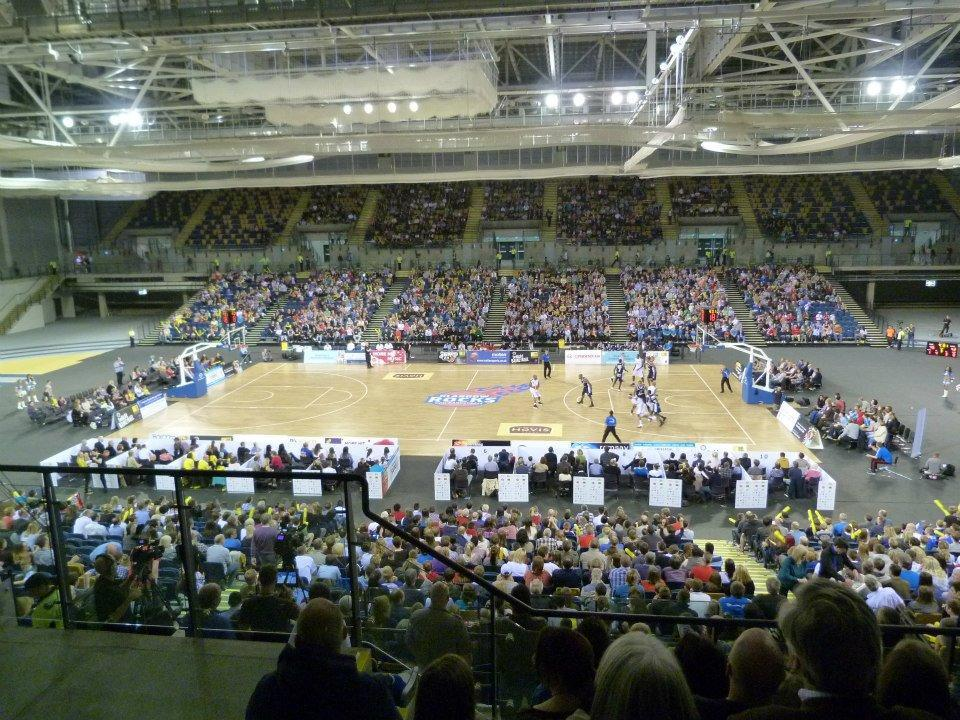
Commonwealth Arena

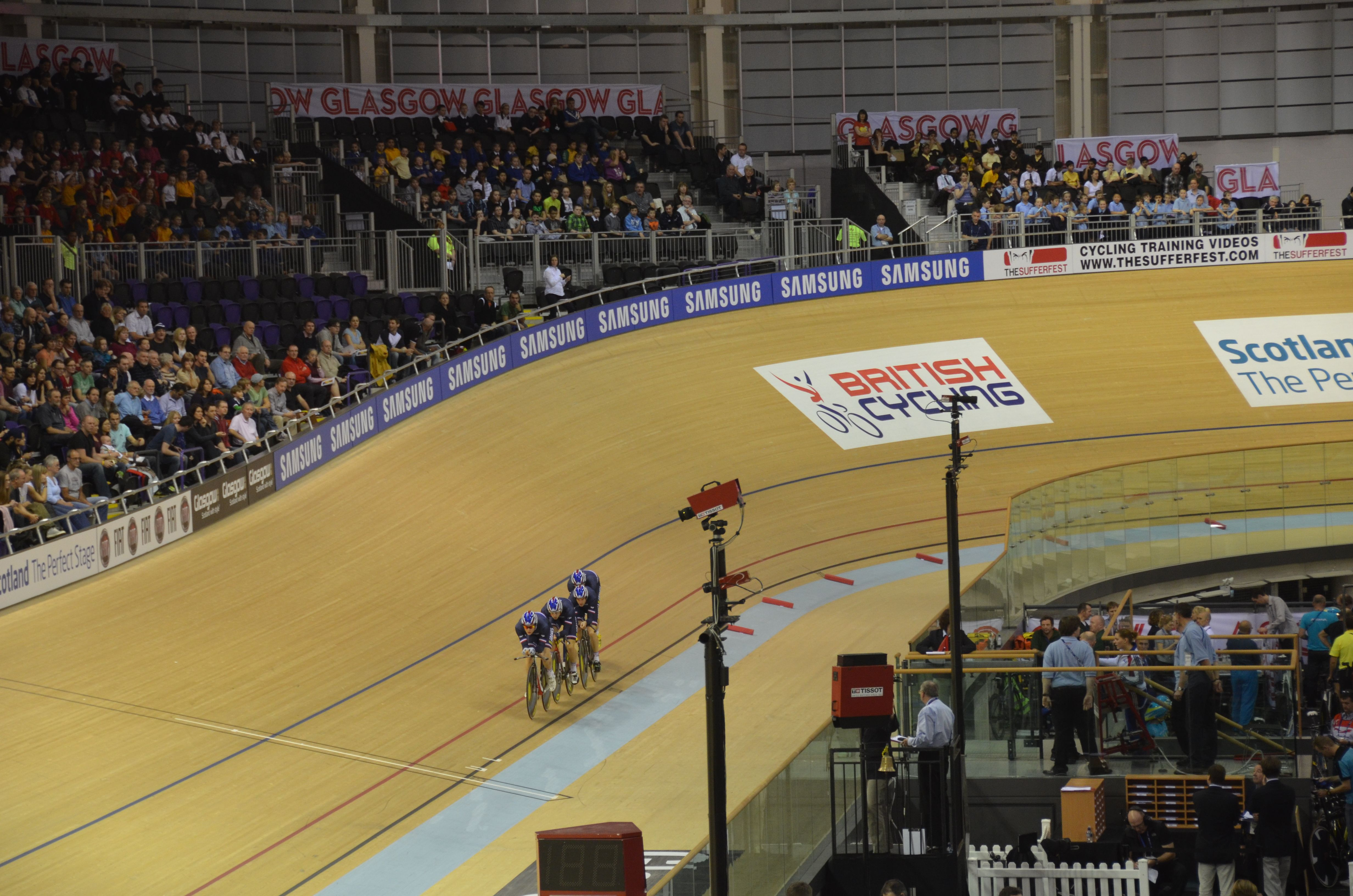
Sir Chris Hoy Velodrome

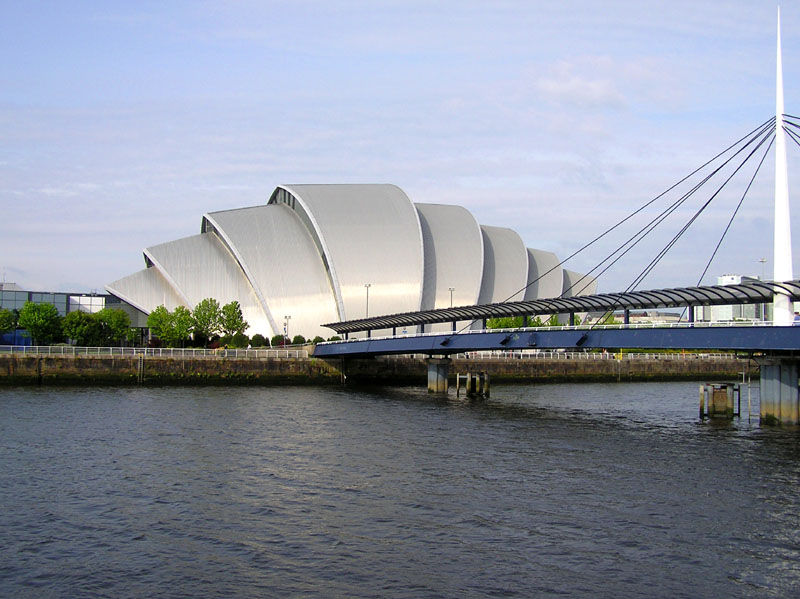
SEC Armadillo

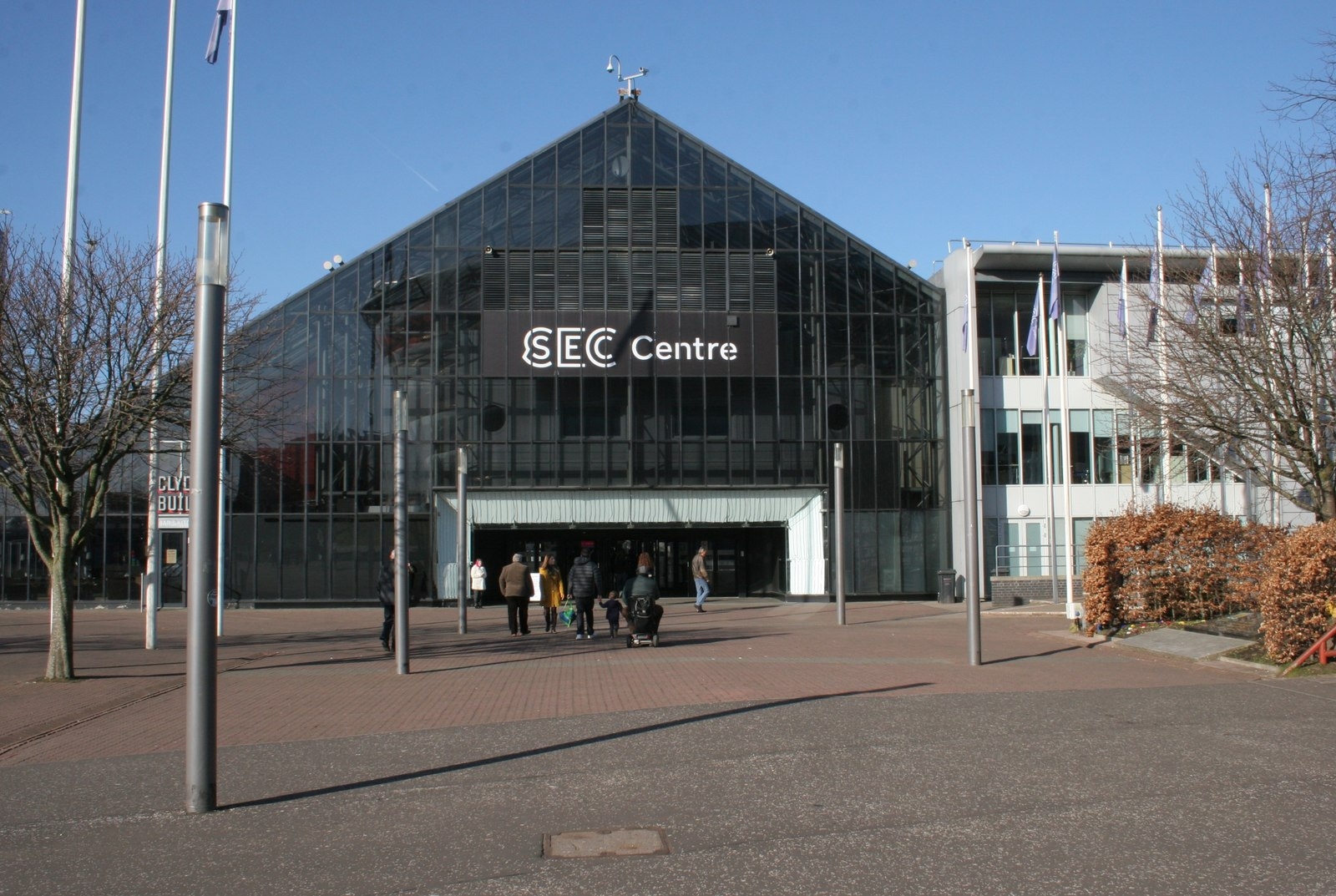
SEC Centre

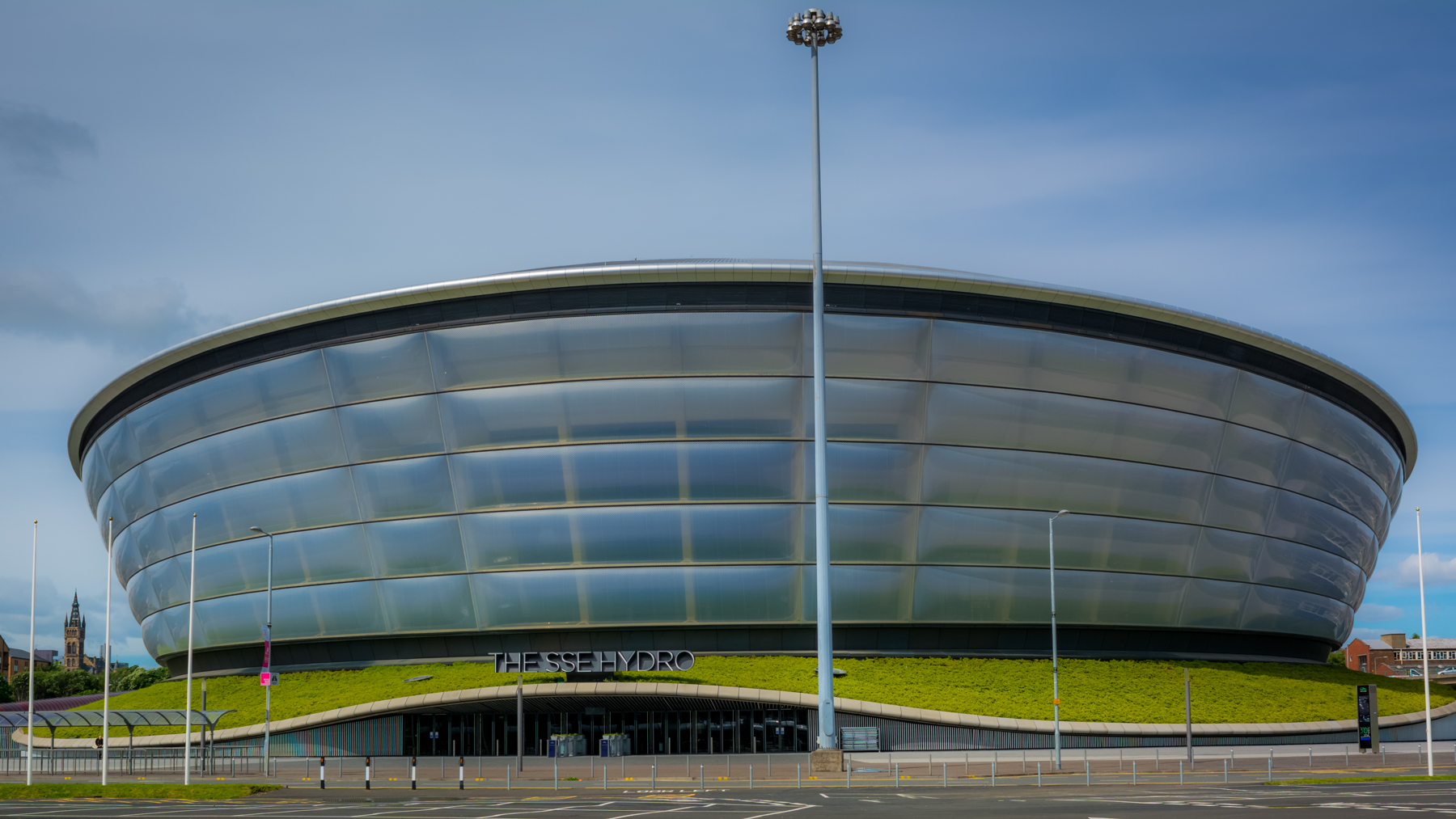
The Hydro

== King's Baton Relay ==
The King's Baton was officially launched on 10 March 2025, to mark the start of the 500-day countdown, with King Charles III, in full military regalia, unveiling the plaque and then handing over the baton to the first runner, Sir Chris Hoy. The baton made from ash wood was designed by Tim Norman. The organisation decided that it would be sent to the Caribbean region to start the global relay with Port of Spain, in Trinidad and Tobago, as the first international stop.

The choice of Trinidad and Tobago was a result of the country successfully hosting the 2023 Commonwealth Youth Games. The Caribbean part of the Baton Relay culminated in Saint Vincent and the Grenadines on Saturday 14 June, before the African leg (15 June to 24 October), then Asia (25 October to 21 December), Oceania (2 January to 26 March 2026), Americas (27 March to 6 May 2026), and Europe (8 May to 23 July 2026).

For the 18th Baton Relay, a new format was introduced where each of the 74 Commonwealth Games Associations (CGAs) received an individual baton crafted in Glasgow. Rather than passing a single baton between nations, each CGA was permitted to customise its baton to reflect its local culture.

In addition to being the first time of being part of The King's Baton Relay, Commonwealth Sport partnered with the Royal Commonwealth Society (RCS) to integrate the Commonwealth Clean Oceans Plastics Campaign into the relay, focusing on ocean conservation and methods for recycling plastic waste.

The King's Baton Relay culminated at the Opening Ceremony of Glasgow 2026 on 23 July 2026, as a traditional and fundamental part of the Commonwealth Games Opening Ceremonies.

== Ceremonies ==
As part of the proposed plan put forward by Commonwealth Games Scotland, the opening and closing ceremonies were scaled down compared to previous Games. It was announced on 20 March 2026 that the opening ceremony would take place at the OVO Hydro, the first time in the Games' 96-year history that a ceremony would be held in an indoor venue.

=== Opening ceremony ===
The opening ceremony of the 2026 Commonwealth Games took place on 23 July 2026 at the OVO Hydro in Glasgow. It was the first Commonwealth Games opening ceremony to be staged entirely indoors. Scottish singer-songwriter KT Tunstall headlined the ceremony, with performances by Callum Beattie, Nina Nesbitt, Nathan Evans and Saint Phnx, while electronic folk duo Valtos provided the soundtrack to the Parade of Nations. The King and Queen, Prime Minister of the United Kingdom and First Minister of Scotland were in attendance. The ceremony concluded the King's Baton Relay.

=== Closing ceremony ===
The closing ceremony of the 2026 Commonwealth Games took place at the OVO Hydro on 2 August 2026, the same venue as the opening ceremony. Scottish rock band Simple Minds headlined the ceremony, with performances by BEMZ, Cammy Barnes and Sandi Thom.

A procession of athletes, volunteers and the flags of the 74 competing nations and territories then entered, as Australian artist Delta Goodrem belted out a pop anthem. Goodrem made her third appearance at a Commonwealth Games ceremony, after performing at the opening ceremonies of the 2006 and 2018 editions in Melbourne and Gold Coast respectively. The scheduled formal handover to the next 2030 Commonwealth Games host city Ahmedabad, India, featured performances by Shankar Mahadevan, Rashmika Mandanna and Miss World 2017 Manushi Chhillar.

Among those in attendance were Prince Edward, Duke of Edinburgh, Sophie, Duchess of Edinburgh, Scottish First Minister John Swinney and Gujarat Deputy Chief Minister Harsh Sanghavi. The Duke of Edinburgh, who is vice patron of Commonwealth Sport, gave an address during the ceremony bringing Glasgow 2026 formally to a close.

== Participating associations ==
All 74 Commonwealth Games Associations participated in the 2026 Commonwealth Games. Gabon and Togo made their debuts after joining the Commonwealth of Nations in June 2022.

Participating Commonwealth Games Associations
- Anguilla (10)
- Antigua and Barbuda (12)
- Australia (257)
- Bahamas (20)
- Bangladesh (15)
- Barbados (21)
- Belize (5)
- Bermuda (13)
- Botswana (25)
- British Virgin Islands (11)
- Brunei (6)
- Cameroon (20)
- Canada (149)
- Cayman Islands (20)
- Cook Islands (15)
- Cyprus (36)
- Dominica (3)
- England (204)
- Eswatini (10)
- Falkland Islands (6)
- Fiji (36)
- Gabon (7)
- The Gambia (12)
- Ghana (40)
- Gibraltar (16)
- Grenada (10)
- Guernsey (20)
- Guyana (16)
- India (122)
- Isle of Man (27)
- Jamaica (76)
- Jersey (22)
- Kenya (98)
- Kiribati (10)
- Lesotho (14)
- Malawi (25)
- Malaysia (59)
- Maldives (13)
- Malta (23)
- Mauritius (40)
- Montserrat (7)
- Mozambique (7)
- Namibia (24)
- Nauru (13)
- New Zealand (113)
- Nigeria (73)
- Niue (11)
- Norfolk Island (6)
- Northern Ireland (65)
- Pakistan (21)
- Papua New Guinea (35)
- Rwanda (10)
- Saint Helena (7)
- Saint Kitts and Nevis (4)
- Saint Lucia (3)
- Saint Vincent and the Grenadines (8)
- Samoa (21)
- Scotland (177) (host)
- Seychelles (18)
- Sierra Leone (19)
- Singapore (53)
- Solomon Islands (13)
- South Africa (112)
- Sri Lanka (40)
- Tanzania (12)
- Togo (10)
- Tonga (28)
- Trinidad and Tobago (37)
- Turks and Caicos Islands (9)
- Tuvalu (8)
- Uganda (57)
- Vanuatu (14)
- Wales (114)
- Zambia (22)

Number of athletes by Commonwealth Games Association

Ranking	CGA	# of Athletes
1	Australia	257
2	England	204
3	Scotland	177
4	Canada	149
5	India	122
6	Wales	114
7	New Zealand	113
8	South Africa	112
9	Kenya	98
10	Jamaica	76
11	Nigeria	73
12	Northern Ireland	65
13	Malaysia	59
14	Uganda	57
15	Singapore	53
16	Ghana	40
16	Mauritius	40
16	Sri Lanka	40
19	Trinidad and Tobago	37
20	Cyprus	36
20	Fiji	36
22	Papua New Guinea	35
23	Tonga	28
24	Isle of Man	27
25	Botswana	25
25	Malawi	25
27	Namibia	24
28	Malta	23
29	Jersey	22
29	Zambia	22
31	Barbados	21
31	Pakistan	21
31	Samoa	21
34	Bahamas	20
34	Cameroon	20
34	Cayman Islands	20
34	Guernsey	20
38	Sierra Leone	19
39	Seychelles	18
40	Gibraltar	16
40	Guyana	16
42	Bangladesh	15
42	Cook Islands	15
44	Lesotho	14
44	Vanuatu	14
46	Bermuda	13
46	Maldives	13
46	Nauru	13
46	Solomon Islands	13
50	Antigua and Barbuda	12
50	The Gambia	12
50	Tanzania	12
53	British Virgin Islands	11
53	Niue	11
55	Anguilla	10
55	Eswatini	10
55	Grenada	10
55	Kiribati	10
55	Rwanda	10
55	Togo	10
61	Turks and Caicos Islands	9
62	Saint Vincent and the Grenadines	8
62	Tuvalu	8
64	Gabon	7
64	Montserrat	7
64	Mozambique	7
64	Saint Helena	7
68	Brunei	6
68	Falkland Islands	6
68	Norfolk Island	6
71	Belize	5
72	Saint Kitts and Nevis	4
73	Dominica	3
73	Saint Lucia	3

== Medal table ==
* Host nation (Scotland)

2026 Commonwealth Games
Rank	CGA	Gold	Silver	Bronze	Total
1	Australia	70	45	56	171
2	England	29	45	36	110
3	Canada	19	20	23	62
4	India	13	17	9	39
5	Scotland*	13	9	17	39
6	New Zealand	10	14	12	36
7	Nigeria	10	7	7	24
8	Jamaica	10	4	5	19
9	Wales	9	10	12	31
10	Malaysia	8	3	5	16
11–45	Others	25	41	61	127
Totals (45 entries)		216	215	243	674

== Sports ==
Given the urgency and lack of time to organise the event, this was the lowest number of sports offered at the Games since 1994. (Note: Para powerlifting is treated as part of the weightlifting programme and 3x3 wheelchair basketball as part of the basketball programme for these purposes, but as separate disciplines in the official schedule.) Starting with this edition, the Games had only the two compulsory sports of athletics and swimming.

- 3x3 basketball (2)
  - Wheelchair 3x3 basketball (2)
- Artistic gymnastics (14)
- Athletics (43)
  - Para-athletics (16)
- Bowls (4)
  - Para bowls (3)
- Boxing (14)
- Judo (14)
- Netball (1)
- Swimming (42)
  - Para swimming (14)
- Track cycling (18)
  - Para track cycling (8)
- Weightlifting (16)
  - Para powerlifting (4)

Six of the chosen sports held a Para sport element. These are Para Athletics, Para Track Cycling, 3x3 Wheelchair Basketball, Para Swimming, Para Bowls, and Para Powerlifting.

Sports and disciplines dropped from the previous Games include badminton, beach volleyball, Twenty20 cricket, diving, hockey, mountain biking, rhythmic gymnastics, road cycling, rugby sevens, squash, table tennis and para table tennis, triathlon and para triathlon and wrestling. Of the full-sided team sports, only netball and 3x3 basketball are included. Some outdoor public access events in retained sports such as athletics (marathons and race walking) and cycling (mountain bike and road cycling) were also dropped due to costs, while the bowls competition was held in the indoor bowls format, rather than the traditional lawn bowls format. Several sports programmes have received changes in their formats. In some cases, the number of quotas has increased, in other cases a new variety was held for the first time.

=== Changes to the sporting programme ===
Parasports
The Games featured the largest number of Para sport events in Commonwealth Games history, with 47 finals across six sports.

Athletics
Organisers decided to add the mixed 4x400 race and opted for the return of the Mile event instead of the 1,500m track event. The mile was last held in 1966; organisers considered the revival an homage to the "Miracle Mile" from Vancouver 1954 between Roger Bannister and John Landy, and for the first time ever, this event was contested by women. Parathletics saw athletes competing in the three disciplines of the sport: jumping, throwing and track events.

Basketball
The number of teams in the 3x3 basketball tournaments has been expanded. While the number of teams in the standing tournament has increased to 12 per gender, the number of wheelchair teams has increased to 8 for the women. The men's 3x3 wheelchair event remained at eight teams.

Bowls
Another major development in Glasgow was the redesign of the bowls competition, which was indoors and not on grass. With the revised programme, the number of events dropped from 11 to 7, as the triples and fours competitions have been removed.

Cycling
Despite the non-occurrence of mountain biking and road events, the number of cycling events held was maintained at 26 with the elimination race added to the able-bodied track programme, and the number of parasports events doubled from 4 to 8 to include C class cyclists.

Swimming
The number of events in the swimming programme increased from 52 to 54 across both Para and non Para competitions, with the addition of the 800m freestyle event for men and the 1500m freestyle event for women.

== Calendar ==
The schedule was released on 31 July 2025.

All times and dates use British Summer Time (UTC+1)

OC	Opening ceremony	●	Event competitions	1	Gold medal events	CC	Closing ceremony

July/August 2026	July									August		Events
July/August 2026	23rd Thu	24th Fri	25th Sat	26th Sun	27th Mon	28th Tue	29th Wed	30th Thu	31st Fri	1st Sat	2nd Sun	Events
Ceremonies	OC										CC	—N/a
3x3 basketball		●	●	●	●	●	4					4
Artistic gymnastics		1	1	2	5	5						14
Athletics					9	6	7	7	11	19		59
Bowls	●	●	●	●	●	3	●	●	●	●	4	7
Boxing		●	●	●	●	●	●		●	14		14
Judo									5	5	4	14
Netball			●	●	●	●	●	●	●	●	1	1
Para powerlifting		4										4
Swimming		9	8	9	9	10	11					56
Track cycling								7	7	6	6	26
Weightlifting				3	4	3	3	3				16
Daily medal events	0	14	9	14	27	27	25	17	23	44	15	215
Cumulative total	0	14	23	37	64	91	116	133	156	200	215	215
July/August 2026	23rd Thu	24th Fri	25th Sat	26th Sun	27th Mon	28th Tue	29th Wed	30th Thu	31st Fri	1st Sat	2nd Sun	Total events
July/August 2026	July									August		Total events

== Marketing ==
=== Visual identity ===
The logo for the 2026 Commonwealth Games was described as a "historic first", integrating the Commonwealth Games Federation logo with the visual and institutional identity of the city of Glasgow. It features symbolic representations of the River Clyde and the Clyde Arc bridge, interwoven within the Commonwealth Sport celebration mark, displayed in the colours of the waterfront. It was created by Glasgow-based agency Loop Design.

The official tartan for the 2026 Commonwealth Games in Glasgow was unveiled in July 2025 and created in collaboration with award-winning Scottish fashion designer Siobhan Mackenzie. Registered with the Scottish Register of Tartans, the design incorporates the vivid blue, pink, and purple tones of Glasgow 2026 set against a steel grey base – a symbolic nod to the city's industrial heritage. The tartan's thread count carries deeper meaning: 74 grey threads represent the number of participating nations and territories, while a bold blue thread count of 26 pays tribute to the year of the Games. The tartan will be produced in Scotland using local textiles and manufacturers.

=== Mascot ===
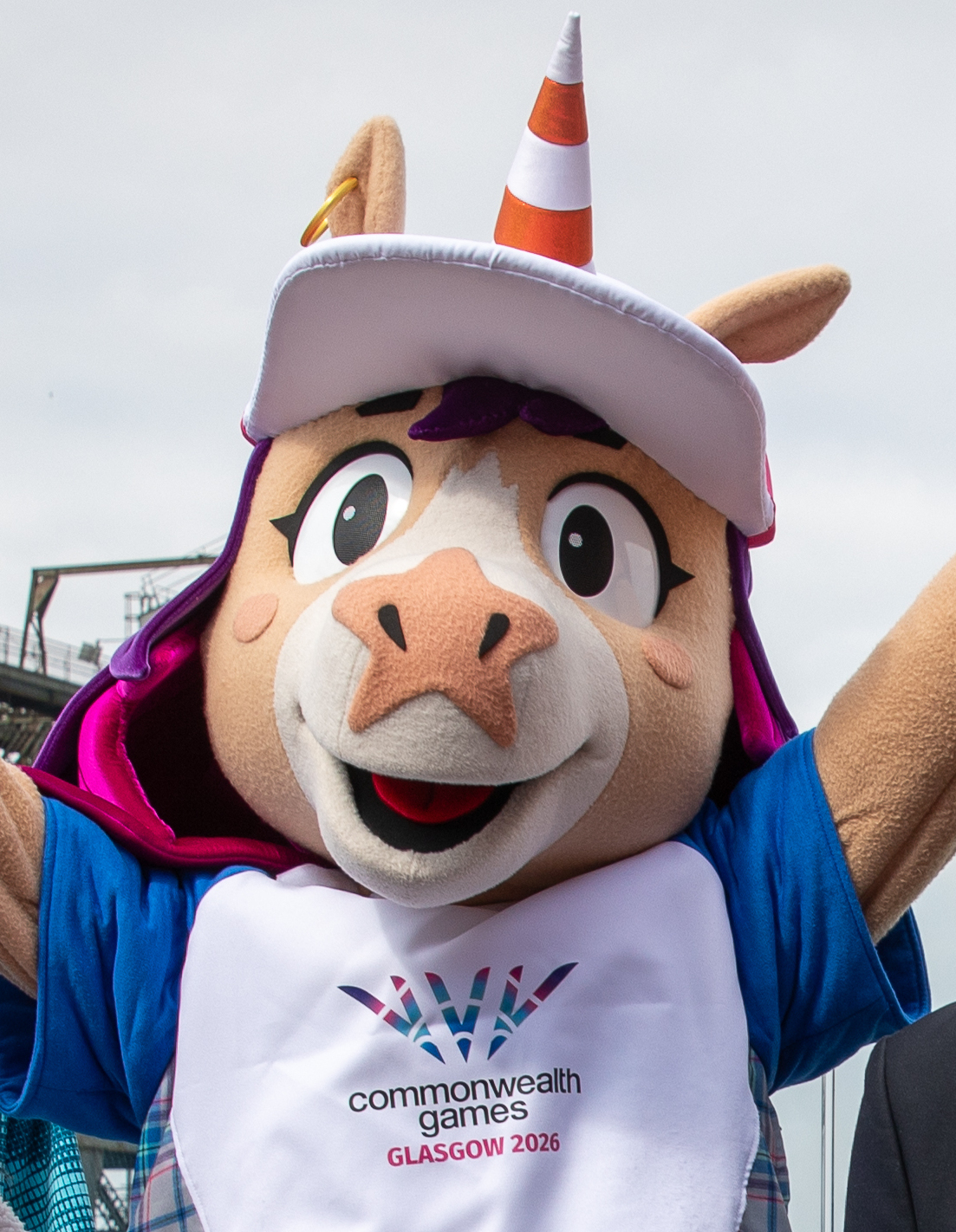
Finnie at the unveiling, 23 July 2025

The official mascot for the 2026 Commonwealth Games was scheduled to be unveiled on 23 July 2025, marking exactly one year until the start of the Games. The mascot was designed by schoolchildren across Scotland, encouraging creativity and youth participation in the lead-up to the international sporting event. Ahead of the announcement, promotional efforts included a light-hearted video released on 9 July 2025 featuring Clyde, the popular thistle mascot of the 2014 Commonwealth Games held in Glasgow.

On 23 July 2025 the mascot of the games was announced as Finnie, a Glaswegian unicorn. She is named after the city's Finnieston Crane and sports a traffic cone as her horn, referencing the custom of putting a traffic cone on Glasgow's Duke of Wellington statue. The unicorn is Scotland's national animal and a supporter of the royal coat of arms of Scotland.

=== Ambassadors ===
Scotland's reigning 10,000m Commonwealth Champion, Eilish McColgan, was announced as the first official Games Ambassador for the Glasgow 2026 Commonwealth Games on 21 July 2025. Weightlifter Emily Campbell, gymnast Jake Jarman, wheelchair basketball player Robyn Love and swimmer Duncan Scott were all subsequently announced as Ambassadors.

=== Corporate sponsorship ===
Sponsors of the 2026 Commonwealth Games
Principal Partners
- Bupa
- EDF Energy
- HBO Max
- Ideagen
- Longines
Partners
- Allied Mobility
- Allwyn Entertainment
- Amul
- BYD Auto
- CMS
- Coca-Cola
- Jubel
- Trespass
- Trivandi
Providers
- Actua
- Dynamik Sports Floors
- Eleiko
- InBudget
- Live Nation Entertainment (Ticketmaster)
- Live Team
- Microplus
- My Peak Challenge
- Riedel Communications
- SLX
- Sting
- Tour De 4
Official Supporters
- Aspen Solutions
- Duncan Farms
- First Travel Solutions
- Glasgow Airport
- Karex (Pasante Healthcare)
- MIH Major Events
- OFX
- Scotsman Hospitality
- Scottish Action for Mental Health
- Scottish Water
- The Superlative Collection
- Vieve
- Walker Slater
- Zero Waste Scotland

=== Tickets ===
Registration for 500,000 pre-sale tickets for the Commonwealth Games opened and ran until 16 October, giving priority to fans from the host city and country, then general public sales started on 30 October 2025. Tickets were available from £26 for medal sessions and £17 for non-medal sessions, with concession tickets starting at £12. Tickets were later reduced closer to the Games for some sports such as bowls to a starting point of £10. It is reported that a total of 434,000 tickets were sold.

== Broadcasting ==
- Asia – ABU
- Australia – Seven Network
- Brunei – RTB
- Canada – CBC/Radio-Canada
- Caribbean region - RushSports
- Europe — Eurosport and HBO Max
- India – DD Sports and Sony Sports Network
- Malaysia – RTM
- New Zealand – Sky
- Singapore – Mediacorp
- Sub-Saharan Africa - Canal+(SuperSport)
- United Kingdom – TNT Sports, 5 (opening ceremony and daily highlights only), S4C (Welsh language), BBC Alba (Gaelic language)
- United States – beIN SPORTS

== See also ==
- 2014 Commonwealth Games - 20th edition of the Commonwealth Games held in Glasgow
- 2018 European Championships - Continental multi-sport event held in Glasgow
- 2026 Central American and Caribbean Games - Regional multi-sport event being held at the same time with some participating countries competing in both events.

== Notes ==
Preceded by Birmingham	Commonwealth Games; Glasgow; XXIII Commonwealth Games	Succeeded by Amdavad
