= Gabriella Wood =

Trinidadian judoka (born 1997)

Personal information
- Born: 4 September 1997 (age 28)
- Occupation: Judoka

Sport
- Country: Trinidad and Tobago
- Sport: Judo
- Weight class: +78 kg

Achievements and titles
- Olympic Games: R32 (2020)
- World Champ.: R32 (2021)
- Pan American Champ.: R16 (2019)

Profile at external databases
- IJF: 24447
- JudoInside.com: 93232
- Updated on 31 January 2023

Gabriella Wood (born 4 September 1997) is a Trinidadian international level judoka. She competed at the 2020 Summer Olympics in the 78 kg class.

She participated at the 2021 World Judo Championships. She is the first woman from Trinidad and Tobago to qualify for Judo in the Olympics, representing Trinidad and Tobago in the Tokyo 2020 Summer Olympic Games.

She attended St. Joseph's Convent Port of Spain, in Port of Spain, Trinidad.
