= Australia at the 2024 Summer Paralympics =

Australian participation at the 2024 Summer Paralympics

- Flag of Australia
- IPC code: AUS
- NPC: Paralympics Australia
- Website: www.paralympic.org.au

in Paris, France August 28, 2024 – September 8, 2024
- Competitors: 159 (89 men and 70 women) in 17 sports
- Flag bearers (opening): Madison de Rozario; Brenden Hall
- Flag bearers (closing): Lauren Parker; James Turner
- Medals Ranked 9th: Gold 18 Silver 17 Bronze 27 Total 62

Summer Paralympics appearances (overview)
- 1960; 1964; 1968; 1972; 1976; 1980; 1984; 1988; 1992; 1996; 2000; 2004; 2008; 2012; 2016; 2020; 2024

Australia competed at the 2024 Summer Paralympics in Paris, France, from 28 August to 8 September 2024.

== Administration ==
In June 2022, Paralympics Australia announced Kate McLoughlin as the Chef de Mission, her third Summer Paralympics in this role. Assistant Chef de Missions: Bridie Kean, Tim Mannion and Ben Troy. Curtis McGrath and Angie Ballard were appointed team captains.

On 2 July 2024, Prime Minister Anthony Albanese and Opposition Leader Peter Dutton showed bipartisan support for the 2024 Australian Paralympic Team with the official team launch in the Great Hall of Parliament House in Canberra.

On 12 July 2024, wheelchair racer Madison de Rozario and swimmer Brenden Hall were announced as Opening Ceremony flag bearers at a ceremony at Admiralty House in Kirribilli, Sydney. Both will be five-time Paralympians.

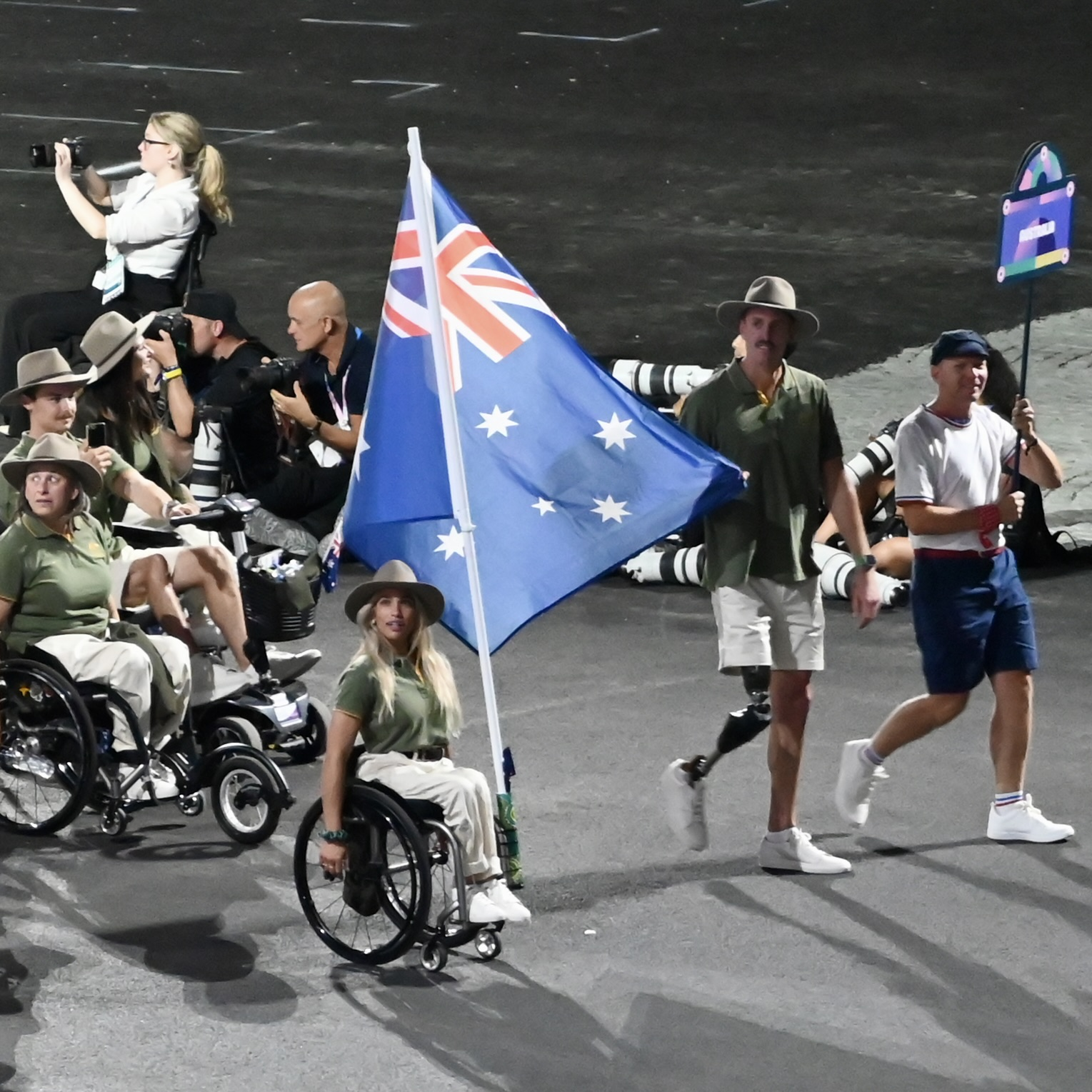
Madison de Rozario and Brenden Hall, Opening Ceremony flag bearers

The team's uniforms are designed and supplied by R.M. Williams, Belgravia, Birkenstock, Mizuno and Speedo.

The Australian government announced that gold medallists would be awarded $20,000, silver medallists $15,000 and bronze medallists $10,000. It brings Australian Paralympic medallists in line with Australian Olympic medallists who receive similar medal reward payments by the Australian Olympic Committee.

The 159 strong team was finalised on 8 August 2024. Dual individual gold medallists - Lauren Parker (paratriathlon and cycling) and James Turner (athletics) carried the flag at the Closing Ceremony.

== Medallists ==
Medal	Name	Sport	Event	Date
Gold	Thomas Gallagher	Swimming	Men's 50 m freestyle S10	29 August 2024
Gold	Korey Boddington	Cycling	Men's time trial C4-5	30 August 2024
Gold	Emily Petricola	Cycling	Women's C4 3000m Individual Pursuit	30 August 2024
Gold	Amanda Reid	Cycling	Women's time trial C1–3	31 August 2024
Gold	Lei Lina; Yang Qian	Table tennis	Women's doubles WD20	31 August 2024
Gold	Nikki Ayers; Jed Altschwager	Rowing	PR3 Mixed Double Sculls	1 September 2024
Gold	Lauren Parker	Paratriathlon	Women's PTWC	2 September 2024
Gold	Jesse Aungles; Timothy Hodge; Emily Beecroft; Alexa Leary; Callum Simpson^{*} Keira Stephens^{*}	Swimming	Mixed 4 x 100 m Medley Relay 34 points	2 September 2024
Gold	James Turner	Athletics	Men's 400m T36	3 September 2024
Gold	Yang Qian	Table tennis	Women's singles WS10	4 September 2024
Gold	Alexa Leary	Swimming	Women's 100 m freestyle S9	4 September 2024
Gold	Lauren Parker	Cycling	Women's road race H1-4	5 September 2024
Gold	Timothy Hodge	Swimming	Men's 200m Individual Medley SM9	5 September 2024
Gold	Vanessa Low	Athletics	Women's long jump T63	5 September 2024
Gold	Benjamin Hance	Swimming	Men's 100m Backstroke S14	6 September 2024
Gold	Callum Simpson	Swimming	Men's 100m Freestyle S8	6 September 2024
Gold	James Turner	Athletics	Men's 100m T36	7 September 2024
Gold	Curtis McGrath	Paracanoeing	Men's KL2	7 September 2024
Silver	Lakeisha Patterson	Swimming	Women's 400 m freestyle S9	29 August 2024
Silver	Jessica Gallagher; Caitlin Ward (pilot)	Cycling	Women's B 1000m Time Trial	30 August 2024
Silver	Michael Roeger	Athletics	Men's 1500 m T46	31 August 2024
Silver	Rowan Crothers	Swimming	Men's 100 m freestyle S10	1 September 2024
Silver	Ahmed Kelly	Swimming	Men's 150 m Individual Medley SM3	1 September 2024
Silver	Jack Ireland; Madeleine McTernan; Ruby Storm; Benjamin Hance	Swimming	Mixed 4 x 100 m Freestyle Relay S14	1 September 2024
Silver	Jake Michel	Swimming	Men's 100 m Breaststroke SB14	2 September 2024
Silver	Jamieson Leeson; Jasmine Haydon (Ramp operator)	Boccia	Women's Individual BC3	2 September 2024
Silver	Daniel Michel; Ashlee Maddern (Ramp operator)	Boccia	Men's Individual BC3	2 September 2024
Silver	Meg Lemon	Cycling	Women's Road Time Trial C4	4 September 2024
Silver	Lauren Parker	Cycling	Women's Road Time Trial H1-3	4 September 2024
Silver	Alistair Donohoe	Cycling	Men's Road Time Trial C5	4 September 2024
Silver	Timothy Hodge	Swimming	Men's 100m Butterfly S9	6 September 2024
Silver	Dylan Littlehales	Paracanoeing	Men's KL3	7 September 2024
Silver	Col Pearse	Swimming	Men's 200m Individual Medley SM10	7 September 2024
Silver	Chloe Osborn; Alexa Leary; Callum Simpson; Rowan Crothers	Swimming	Mixed 4 x 100 m Freestyle Relay 34 points	7 September 2024
Silver	Madison de Rozario	Athletics	Women's marathon T54	8 September 2024
Bronze	Rowan Crothers	Swimming	Men's 50 m freestyle S10	29 August 2024
Bronze	Brenden Hall	Swimming	Men's 400 m freestyle S9	29 August 2024
Bronze	Madison de Rozario	Athletics	Women's 1500 m T54	31 August 2024
Bronze	Jack Ireland	Swimming	Men's 200 m freestyle S14	31 August 2024
Bronze	Mali Lovell	Athletics	Women's 200 m T36	1 September 2024
Bronze	Gordon Allan; Korey Boddington; Alistair Donohoe	Cycling	Open C1-5 750m Team Sprint	1 September 2024
Bronze	Thomas Gallagher	Swimming	Men's 100 m freestyle S10	1 September 2024
Bronze	Grant Patterson	Swimming	Men's 150 m Individual Medley SM3	1 September 2024
Bronze	Dayna Crees	Athletics	Women's Javelin Throw F34	1 September 2024
Bronze	Australia national wheelchair rugby team: Ryley Batt; Chris Bond; James McQuillan; Beau Vernon; Ella Sabljak; Emilie Miller; Jake Howe; Ben Fawcett; Brayden Foxley-Connolly; Shae Graham; Andrew Edmondson; Josh Nicholson	Wheelchair rugby	Mixed tournament	2 September 2024
Bronze	Michal Burian	Athletics	Men's Javelin Throw F64	2 September 2024
Bronze	Rachael Watson	Swimming	Women's 100 m Freestyle S3	3 September 2024
Bronze	Alex Saffy	Swimming	Men's 100 m Butterfly S10	3 September 2024
Bronze	Alana Forster	Cycling	Women's Road Time Trial C5	4 September 2024
Bronze	Darren Hicks	Cycling	Men's Road Time Trial C2	4 September 2024
Bronze	Ricky Betar	Swimming	Men's 200m Individual Medley SM14	4 September 2024
Bronze	Grant Patterson	Swimming	Men's 50m Backstroke SB2	4 September 2024
Bronze	Samuel von Einem	Table tennis	Men's singles MS11	5 September 2024
Bronze	Thomas Gallagher	Swimming	Men's 100m Backstroke S10	6 September 2024
Bronze	Lewis Bishop	Swimming	Men's 100m Butterfly S9	6 September 2024
Bronze	Emily Beecroft	Swimming	Women's 100m Butterfly S9	6 September 2024
Bronze	Rachael Watson	Swimming	Women's 50 m Freestyle S4	6 September 2024
Bronze	Rheed McCracken	Athletics	Men's 800 m T34	7 September 2024
Bronze	Ma Lin	Table tennis	Men's singles MS9	7 September 2024
Bronze	Susan Seipel	Paracanoeing	Women's VL2	7 September 2024
Bronze	Lei Lina	Table tennis	Women's singles WS9	7 September 2024
Bronze	Reece Langdon	Athletics	Men's 1500 m T38	7 September 2024

=== Medals by sport ===
Medals by sport
Sport	Gold medal	Silver medal	Bronze medal	Total
Swimming	6	8	13	27
Cycling	4	4	3	11
Athletics	3	2	6	11
Table Tennis	2	0	3	5
Paracanoeing	1	1	1	3
Rowing	1	0	1	2
Triathlon	1	0	0	1
Boccia	0	2	0	2
Wheelchair Rugby	0	0	1	1
Total	18	17	27	62

=== Medals by date ===
Medals by date
Day	Date	Gold medal	Silver medal	Bronze medal	Total
1	29 Aug	1	1	2	4
2	30 Aug	2	1	0	3
3	31 Aug	2	1	2	5
4	1 Sep	1	3	5	90
5	2 Sep	2	3	2	7
6	3 Sep	1	0	2	3
7	4 Sep	2	3	4	9
8	5 Sep	3	0	1	4
9	6 Sep	2	1	4	7
10	7 Sep	2	3	5	10
11	8 Sep	0	1	0	1
Total		18	17	27	62

=== Medals by gender ===
Medals by gender^{(Comparison graphs)}
Gender	Gold medal	Silver medal	Bronze medal	Total	Percentage
Female	8	6	9	23	
Male	8	9	16	33	
Mixed	2	2	2	6	
Total	18	17	27	62	100%

== Competitors ==
The following is the list of number of selected competitors in the Games.

Sport	Men	Women	Total
Archery	3	3	6
Athletics	17	17	34
Badminton	0	2	2
Boccia	1	3	4
Cycling	6	6	12
Equestrian	0	4	4
Judo	0	1	1
Paracanoeing	2	1	3
Powerlifting	1	1	2
Rowing	4	4	8
Shooting	1	1	2
Swimming	15	15	30
Table tennis	7	5	12
Triathlon	9	4	13
Wheelchair basketball	12	0	12
Wheelchair rugby	9	3	12
Wheelchair tennis	2	0	2
Total	89	70	159

- Lauren Parker only included in triathlon but also competing in road cycling; wheelchair tennis player Heath Davidson withdrew.
- Includes support athletes/assistants: Athletics - 2 guides; Boccia - 2 ramp assistants; Cycling - 2 pilots; Triathlon - 1 guide; Rowing - 1 coxswain - these are regarded as part of team by Paralympics Australia.

== Archery ==
Australia secured seven quota places in all of the individual event, and two quotas in mixed team event, by virtue of their result at the 2023 World Para Archery Championships in Plzeň, Czech Republic; and at the 2024 Africa–Oceania Qualification Tournament in Dubai, United Arab Emirates. Six athletes were selected by Paralympics Australia on 21 June 2024: Men - Jonathon Milne, Taymon Kenton-Smith, Patrick French; Women - Amanda Jennings, Ameera Lee, Melissa Tanner Reigning W1 men's World Champion Christopher Davis was forced to withdraw from the team due to injury.

Men

Athlete	Event	Ranking Round		Round of 32	Round of 16	Quarterfinals	Semifinals	Final	Rank
Athlete	Event	Score	Seed	Opposition Score	Opposition Score	Opposition Score	Opposition Score	Opposition Score	
Jonathon Milne	Individual compound	693	10	Oe (JPN); W 147-142	Polish (USA); L 142-144	Did not advance			
Patrick French	Individual compound	684	21	Swagumilang (INA); L 138-140	Did not advance				
Taymon Kenton-Smith	Individual recurve	596	23	Gan (CHN); W 6-2	Molina (MEX); W 6-4	Kwak (KOR); W 6-4	Ciszek (POL); L 2-6	Arab Ameri (IRI); L 0-6	4

Women

Athlete	Event	Ranking Round		Round of 32	Round of 16	Quarterfinals	Semifinals	Final	Rank
Athlete	Event	Score	Seed	Opposition Score	Opposition Score	Opposition Score	Opposition Score	Opposition Score	
Ameera Lee	Individual compound	649	22	Alim (SIN); W (135-133)	Rigault Chupin (FRA); L (132-140)	Did not advance			
Melissa Tanner	Individual compound	646	23	Riveros (CRC); W (137–133)	Paterson Pine (GBR); L (136-140)	Did not advance			
AJ Jennings	Individual recurve	531	16	Wulandari (INA); W 7-3	Mijno (ITA); L 0-6	Did not advance			

Mixed

Athlete	Event	Ranking Round		Round of 16	Quarterfinals	Semifinals	Final	Rank
Athlete	Event	Score	Seed	Opposition Score	Opposition Score	Opposition Score	Opposition Score	
Jonathon Milne; Ameera Lee	Team compound	1342	10	Guerin; Rigault Chupin (FRA); W 142-134	Grinham; MacQueen (GBR); L 141-150	Did not advance		
Taymon Kenton-Smith; AJ Jennings	Team recurve	1127	12	Singh / Jatyan (IND); L 4-5	Did not advance			

== Athletics ==
Australian track and field athletes achieved quota places for the following events based on their results at the 2023 World Championships, 2024 World Championships, or through high performance allocation, as long as they meet the minimum entry standard (MES).

Key

- Note–Ranks given for track events are within the athlete's heat only
- Q = Qualified for the next round
- q = Qualified for the next round as a fastest loser or, in field events, by position without achieving the qualifying target
- DQ = Disqualified
- PR = Paralympic Record
- AR = Area (or continental) Record
- NR = National Record
- SB = Season's Best
- N/A = Round not applicable for the event
- Bye = Athlete not required to compete in round

Track & road events
Men

Athlete	Event	Heat		Final	
Athlete	Event	Result	Rank	Result	Rank
Luke Bailey	100 m T54	14.39	4 q	14.39	7
Luke Bailey	800 m T54	1:51.34	7	Did not advance	
Luke Bailey	400 m T54	48.11	7	Did not advance	
Jaryd Clifford; Matthew Clarke & Tim Logan (guides)	1500 m T13	—N/a		3:44.95 SB	4
Jaryd Clifford; Matthew Clarke & Tim Logan (guides)	5000 m T13	—N/a		DQ	
Angus Hincksman	1500 m T38	—N/a		4:14.14	4
Reece Langdon	1500 m T38	—N/a		4:13.13	3rd place, bronze medalist(s)
Rheed McCracken	100 m T34	15.62 SB	5 Q	15.31 SB	4
Rheed McCracken	800 m T34	1:41.51	4 q	1:40.13	3rd place, bronze medalist(s)
Sam McIntosh	100 m T52	17.88	9	Did not advance	
Sam McIntosh	400 m T52	1:10.33	11	Did not advance	
Chad Perris	100 m T13	10.87	4 Q	10.80	4
Sam Rizzo	800 m T54	1:45.33	12	Did not advance	
Sam Rizzo	1500 m T54	3:02.92	9	Did not advance	
Sam Rizzo	5000 m T54	11:19.32	6	Did not advance	
Michael Roeger	1500 m T46	—N/a		3:51.19	2nd place, silver medalist(s)
James Turner	100 m T36	12.09	4 Q	11.85 PR	1st place, gold medalist(s)
James Turner	400 m T36	—N/a		51.54 WR	1st place, gold medalist(s)

Women

Athlete	Event	Heat		Final	
Athlete	Event	Result	Rank	Result	Rank
Angela Ballard	400 metres T53	—N/a		59.12	6
Angela Ballard	800 metres T53	—N/a		1:56.83	6
Telaya Blacksmith	400 metres T20	57.96	5 q	59.37	8
Rhiannon Clarke	100 metres T38	12.78 AR	4 q	12.72 AR	4
Rhiannon Clarke	400 metres T38	1:01.39 AR	5 Q	1:00.81 AR	5
Annabelle Colman	1500 m T20	—N/a		4:31.54 AR	4
Abby Craswell	100 metres T36	15.28	4	Did not advance	
Madison de Rozario	1500 m T54	3:20.09	2 Q	3:20.32	5
Madison de Rozario	5000 m T54	11:43.64	2 Q	11:10.20	3rd place, bronze medalist(s)
Madison de Rozario	Marathon T53	—N/a		1:46:13	2nd place, silver medalist(s)
Mali Lovell	100 metres T36	14.57	3 Q	14.80	5
Mali Lovell	200 metres T36	30.08	3 Q	29.82	3rd place, bronze medalist(s)
Ella Pardy	100 metres T38	13.15	6	Did not advance	

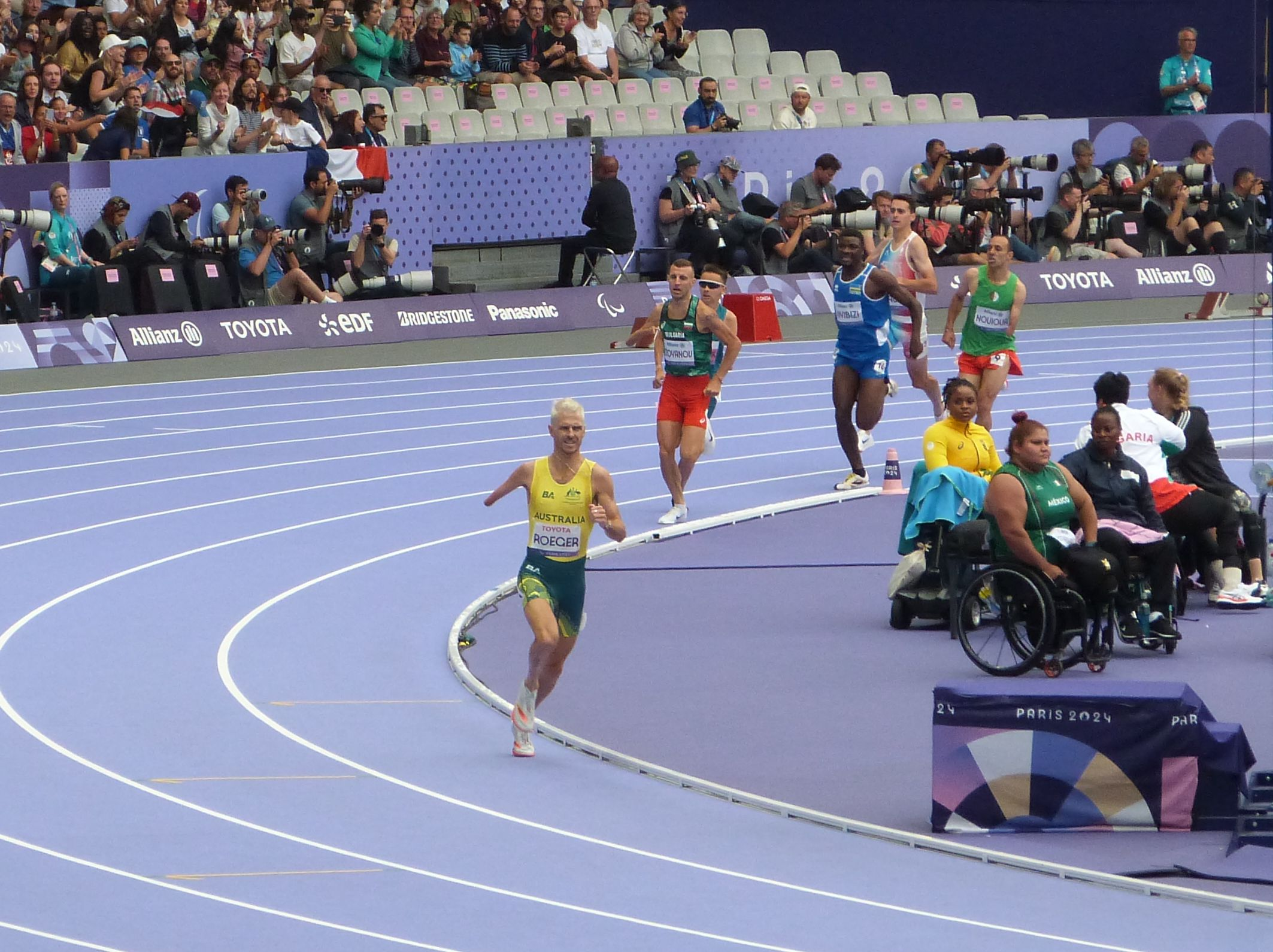
Michael Roeger leading in the 1500m T46 final at the Paris Paralympics

Field events
Men

Athlete	Event	Final	
Athlete	Event	Distance	Position
Corey Anderson	Javelin throw F38	49.34	6
Michal Burian	Javelin throw F64	64.89	3rd place, bronze medalist(s)
Jackson Hamilton	Javelin throw F13	59.20 AR	6
Guy Henley	Discus throw F37	48.58	8
Nicholas Hum	Long jump T20	6.97	6

Women

Athlete	Event	Final	
Athlete	Event	Distance	Position
Telaya Blacksmith	Long jump T20	5.21 AR	9
Sarah Clifton-Bligh	Shot put F32	4.85	10
Sarah Clifton-Bligh	Club throw	14.70	16
Dayna Crees	Javelin throw F34	17.65	3rd place, bronze medalist(s)
Dayna Crees	Shot put F34	6.30 PB	9
Sarah Edmiston	Discus throw F44	34.33 SB	7
Ella Hose	Shot put F37	11.25	4
Ella Hose	Discus throw F38	28.36 SB	11
Rosemary Little	Shot put F32	5.91	6
Rosemary Little	Club throw	16.65 AR	13
Vanessa Low	Long jump T63	5.45 WR	1st place, gold medalist(s)
Samantha Schmidt	Discus throw F38	33.05 SB	7
Maria Strong	Shot put F33	6.35	8
Sarah Walsh	Long jump T64	4.88	8

== Badminton ==
Two athletes were selected on 23 May 2024– Celine Vinot and Mischa Ginns. Ginns withdrew due to illness in Paris.

Athlete	Event	Group Stage				Quarterfinal	Semifinal	Final / BM	
Athlete	Event	Opposition Score	Opposition Score	Opposition Score	Rank	Opposition Score	Opposition Score	Opposition Score	Rank
Mischa Ginns	Women's singles WH2	Withdrew							
Celine Vinot	Women's singles SL3	Bolaji (NGR); L 0-2	Mandeep Kaur (IND); L 1-2	—N/a	3	Did not advance			

== Boccia ==
Daniel Michel and Jamieson Leeson, and their respective ramp operators Ash Maddern and Jasmine Haydon were selected on 11 June 2024.

Athlete	Event	Pool matches				Quarterfinals	Semifinals	Final / BM	
Athlete	Event	Opposition Score	Opposition Score	Opposition Score	Rank	Opposition Score	Opposition Score	Opposition Score	Rank
Daniel Michel	Men's individual BC3	Morapedi (RSA); W 10–2	Wilson (GBR); W 7–2	Arnott (GBR); W 3–2	1 Q	Romero (ARG); W 5–0	Polychronidis (GRE); W 6–1	Jeong H-w (KOR); L 2–5	2nd place, silver medalist(s)
Jamieson Leeson	Women's individual BC3	Kang S-h (KOR); L 1–6	Kidson (GBR); W 6–1	Oliveira (BRA); W 4–3	2 Q	Ferrando (ARG); W 4–3	Calado (BRA); W 7–1	Ho (HKG); L 2–4	2nd place, silver medalist(s)
Daniel Michel; Jamieson Leeson	Mixed pairs BC3	France; W 5–2	Japan; W 5–2	—N/a	1 Q	South Korea; L 2–4	Did not advance		6

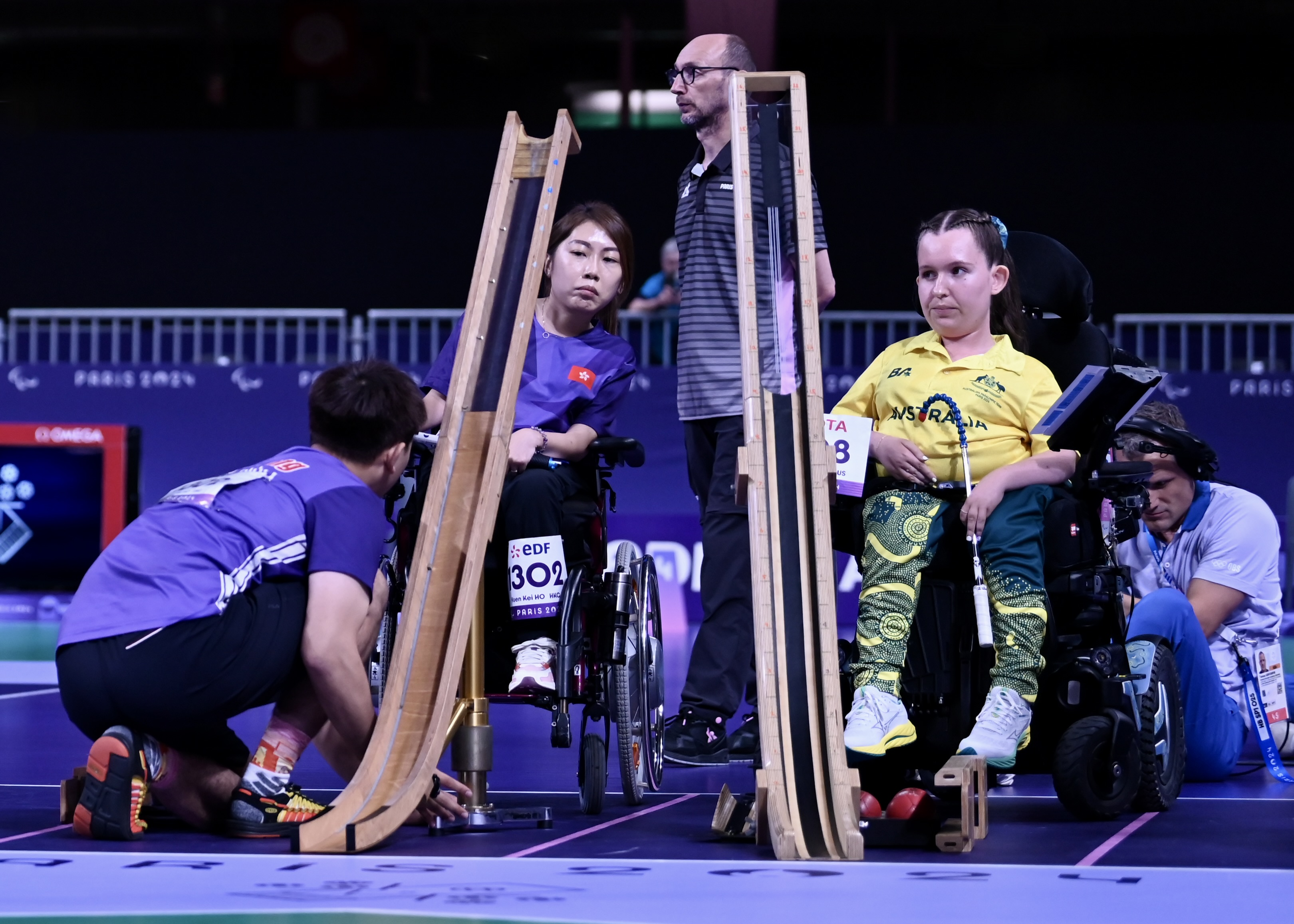
Jamieson Leeson at the 2024 Paris Paralympics

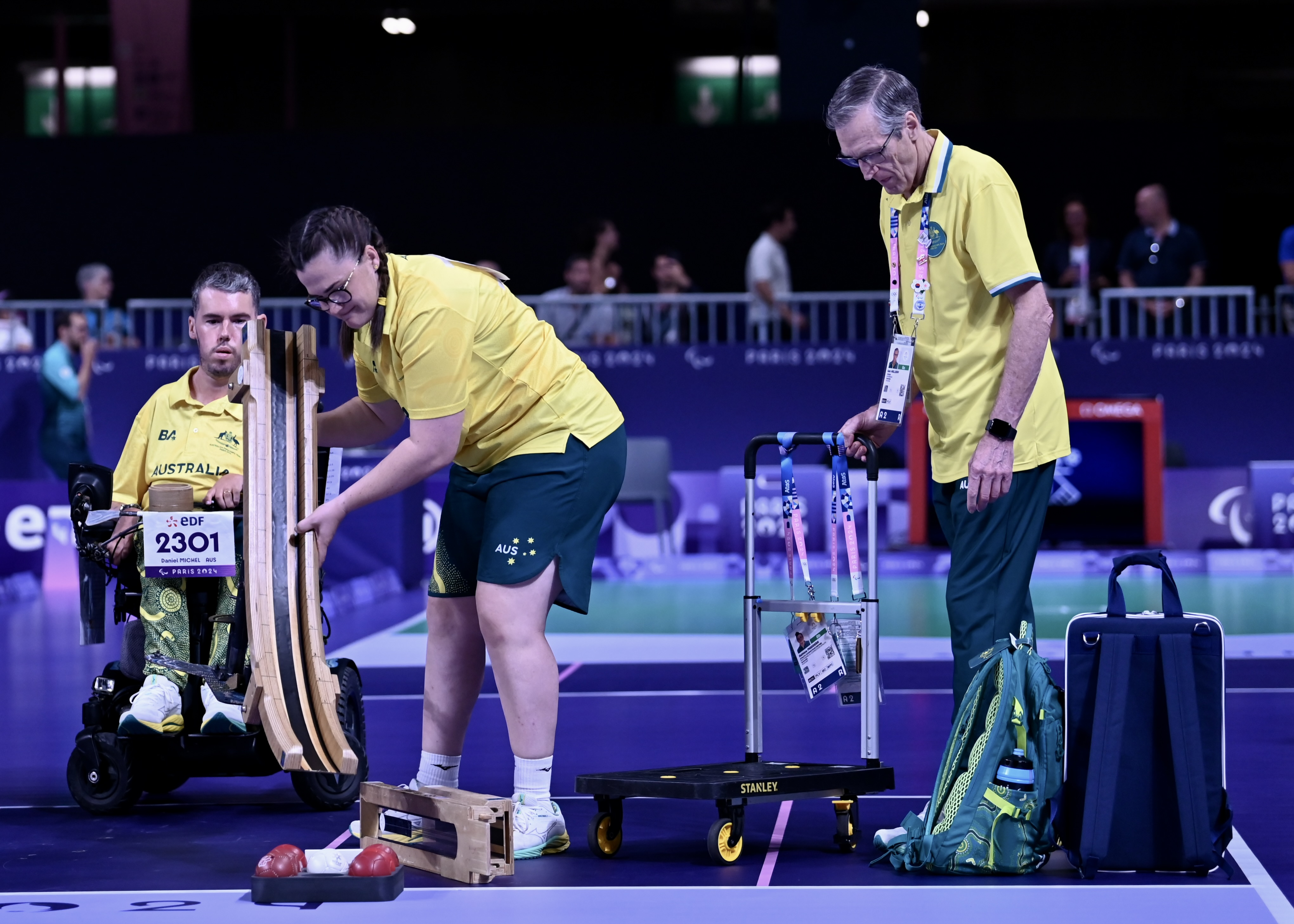
Dan Michel at the 2024 Paris Paralympics

== Cycling ==
Thirteen athletes selected on 31 July 2024 with Korey Boddington, Kane Perris and Alana Forster making their Paralympics debut.

Key

- Q = Qualified for the next round
- QB = Qualified for the brinze medal race
- QG = Qualified for the gold medal race
- WR = World Record
- DNF - Did not finish
- OVL = Overlapped

Track Event — Women

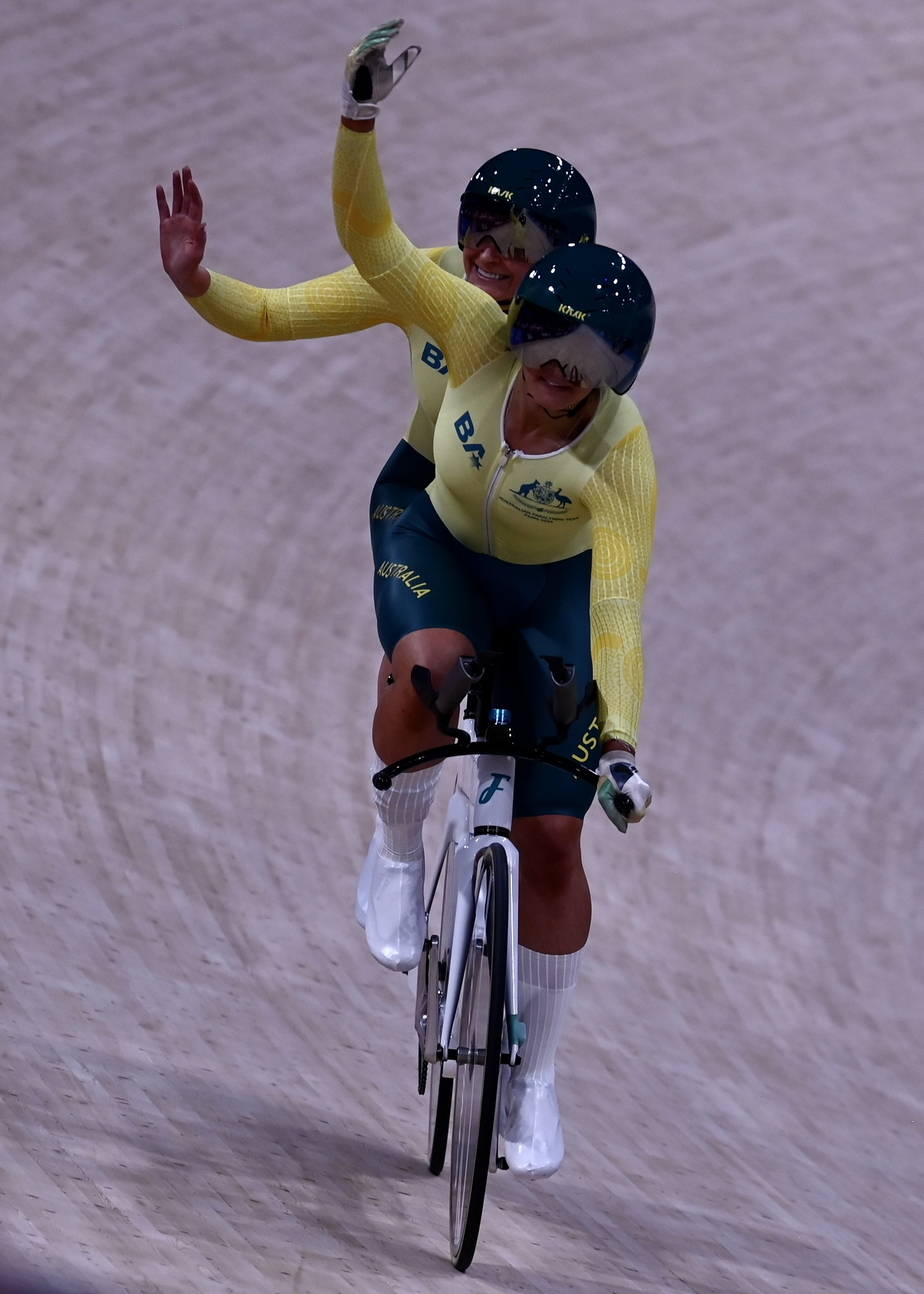
Silver medalists Caitlin Ward (front) and Jessica Gallagher (back)

Athlete	Event	Qualification		Final	
Athlete	Event	Time	Rank	Opposition Time	Rank
Alana Forster	Individual pursuit C5	3:41.497	5	Did not advance	
Jessica Gallagher; Pilot:Caitlin Ward	Women's individual pursuit B	3:46.294	7	Did not advance	
Jessica Gallagher; Pilot:Caitlin Ward	Women's 1km time trial B	1:07.214	2 Q	1:07.533	2nd place, silver medalist(s)
Meg Lemon	Individual pursuit C4	3:49.703	6	Did not advance	
Emily Petricola	Individual pursuit C4	3:35.856 WR	1 QG	OVL	1st place, gold medalist(s)
Amanda Reid	500 m time trial C1-3	38.663	1 Q	38.811	1st place, gold medalist(s)

Track Events - Men

Athlete	Event	Qualification		Final	
Athlete	Event	Time	Rank	Opposition Time	Rank
Gordon Allan	Time trial C1-3	1:09.403	5 Q	1:09.803	5
Korey Boddington	Time trial C4-5	1:02.021 PR	1 Q	1:01.650	1st place, gold medalist(s)
Darren Hicks	Individual pursuit C2	3:33.098	5	Did not advance	
Kane Perris; Pilot:Luke Zaccaria	Men's 1 km time trial B	59.628	3 Q	1:00.940	4
Kane Perris; Pilot:Luke Zaccaria	Men's individual pursuit B	5:42.837	14	Did not advance	

Track Event — Mixed

Athlete	Event	Qualification		Final	
Athlete	Event	Time	Rank	Opposition Time	Rank
Korey Boddington; Alistair Donohoe; Gordon Allan	Mixed team sprint C1-5	49.569	3 QB	49.036	3rd place, bronze medalist(s)

Road Events — Women

Athlete	Event	Time	Rank
Alana Forster	Women's road time trial C5	21:00.48	3rd place, bronze medalist(s)
Alana Forster	Women's road race C4-5	2:00:49	7
Meg Lemon	Women's road time trial C4	21:44.16	2nd place, silver medalist(s)
Meg Lemon	Women's road race C4-5	2:07:48	12
Lauren Parker	Women's road time trial H1-3	24:24.09	2nd place, silver medalist(s)
Lauren Parker	Women's road race H1-4	52:04	1st place, gold medalist(s)
Emily Petricola	Women's road time trial C4	21:48.44	4
Emily Petricola	Women's road race C4-5	2:01:23	11
Amanda Reid	Women's road time trial C1-3	25:19.73	13
Amanda Reid	Women's road race C1-3	1:57:02	13

Road Events — Men

Athlete	Event	Time	Rank
Grant Allen	Men's road race H4	2:03:01	22
Korey Boddington	Men's road race C4-5	DNF	
Alistair Donohoe	Men's road time trial C5	36:18.66	2nd place, silver medalist(s)
Alistair Donohoe	Men's road race C4-5	2:25:58	6
Darren Hicks	Men's road time trial C2	19:40.08	3rd place, bronze medalist(s)
Darren Hicks	Men's road race C1-3	1:51:30	13

== Equestrian ==
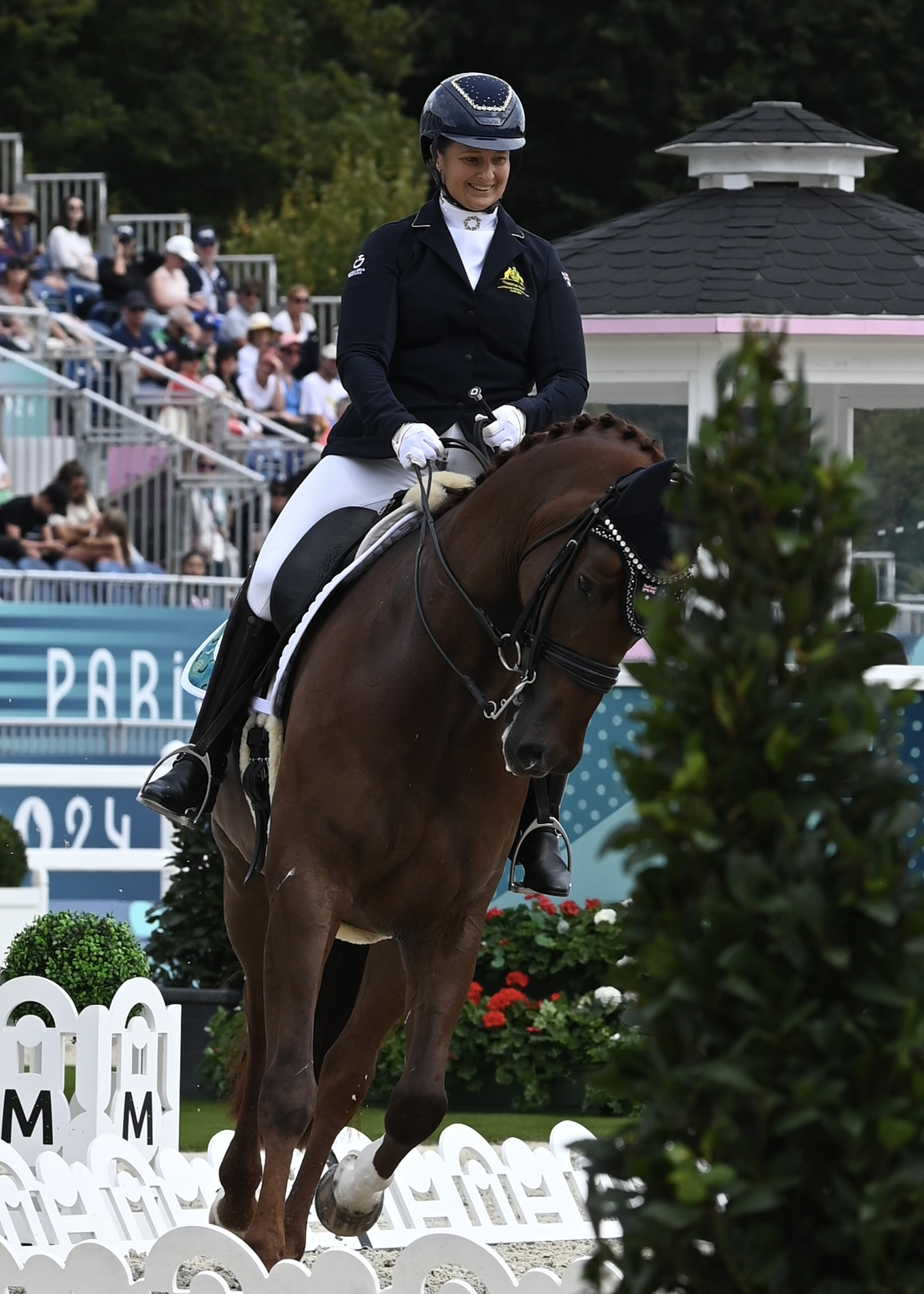
Lisa Martin in the individual competition

Four riders selected on 4 July 2024 with Lisa Martin competing at her second Games.

Individual competition

Athlete	Horse	Event	Total	
Athlete	Horse	Event	Score	Rank
Stella Barton	Lord Lamarque	Individual championship test grade I	70.833	8 Q
Stella Barton	Lord Lamarque	Dressage individual team test grade I	73.960	7
Bridget Murphy	Penmain Promise	Individual championship test grade II	66.724	7 Q
Bridget Murphy	Penmain Promise	Dressage individual team test grade II	70.154	7
Dianne Barnes	Sorena	Individual championship test grade IV	65.444	12
Dianne Barnes	Sorena	Dressage individual team test grade IV	Did not advance	
Lisa Martin	Vilaggio	Individual championship test grade V	70.436	5 Q
Lisa Martin	Vilaggio	Dressage individual team test grade V	71.905	6

Team

Athlete	Horse	Event	Individual score	Total	
Athlete	Horse	Event	TT	Score	Rank
Stella Barton	See above	Team	70.375	206.343	12
Bridget Murphy	See above	Team	67.100	206.343	12
Lisa Martin	See above	Team	68.868	206.343	12

== Judo ==
On 24 July 2024, Taylor Gosens was selected as Australia's first female judoka since 2004 Athens Paralympics.

Athlete	Event	Preliminaries	Quarterfinals	Semifinals	Repechage Quarter final	Repechage Final	Final / BM	
Athlete	Event	Opposition Result	Opposition Result	Opposition Result	Opposition Result	Opposition Result	Opposition Result	Rank
Taylor Gosens	Women's +70 kg J2	—N/a	Hernández (CUB) L 0-10	—N/a	Raifova (KAZ) L 0-10	Did not advance		

== Paracanoeing ==
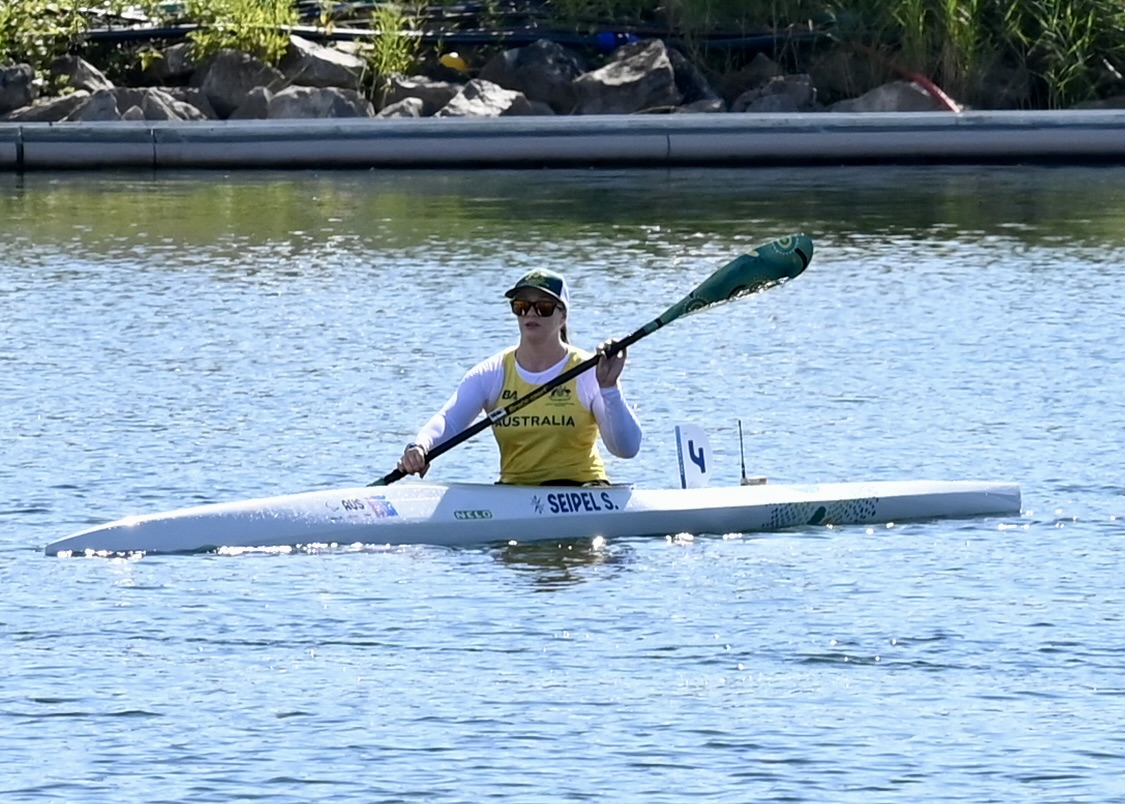
Susan Seipel in the Women's KL2

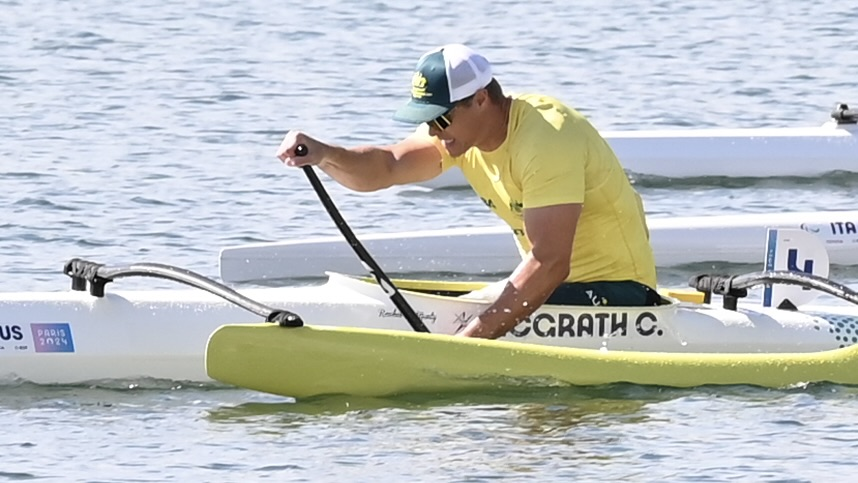
Curtis McGrath on racing at the Paros Paralympics

Australia earned quota places for the following events through the 2023 ICF Canoe Sprint World Championships in Duisburg, Germany; 2024 ICF Canoe Sprint World Championships in Szeged, Hungary.

Athlete	Event	Heats		Semi-Final		Final	
Athlete	Event	Time	Rank	Time	Rank	Time	Rank
Curtis McGrath	Men's KL2	42.66	1 FA	—N/a		41.31	1st place, gold medalist(s)
Curtis McGrath	Men's VL3	48.97 PGB	1 FA	—N/a		48.34	4
Dylan Littlehales	Men's KL3	42.21	1 FA	—N/a		40.68	2nd place, silver medalist(s)
Susan Seipel	Women's KL2	1:01.29	3 SF	57.17	1 FA	56.57	5
Susan Seipel	Women's VL2	1:04.03	3 SF	1:02.17	1 FA	1:01.39	3rd place, bronze medalist(s)

Qualification legend: FA - Qualify to medal final; FB - Qualify to non-medal final; SF - Qualify to semifinal

== Paratriathlon ==
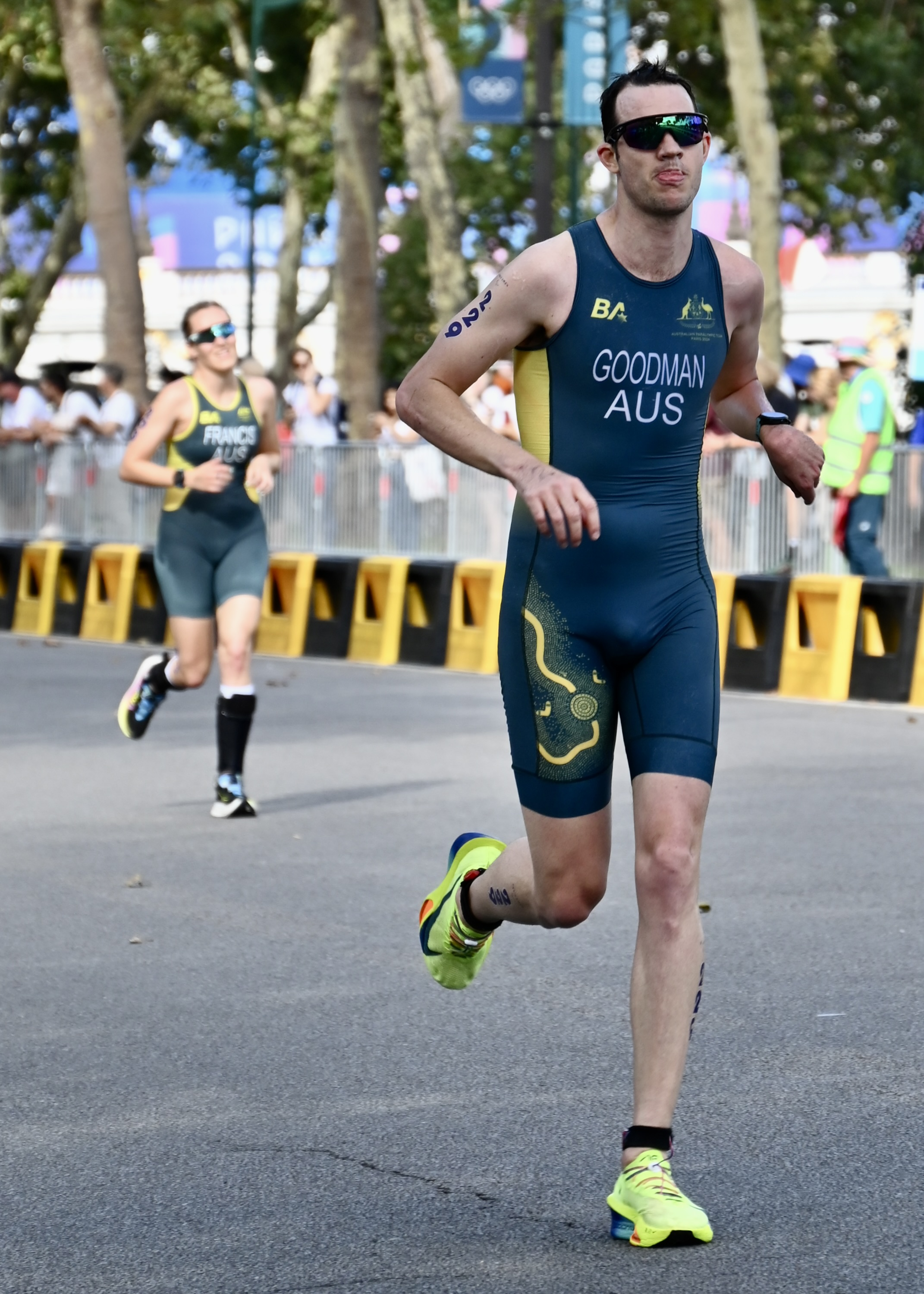
Tom Goodman and Anu Francis in the triathlon

A team of twelve athletes and one guide was selected on 2024 July 2021. Seven athletes will be making their Paralympics Games debut and Sam Harding competing in triathlon after being a distance runner at the 2020 Tokyo Paralympics. Men

Athlete	Event	Swim	Trans 1	Bike	Trans 2	Run	Total Time	Rank
Tom Goodman	PTS2	19:05	2:04	36:49	1:17	21:57	1:21:12	9
Justin Godfrey	PTS3	17:15	2:15	36:54	0:55	35:30	1:32:49	11
Jeremy Peacock	PTS4	11:42	1:00	32:43	0:33	19:03	1:05:01	8
Liam Twomey	PTS4	10:45	1:11	33:20	0:48	21:55	1:07:59	13
David Bryant	PTS5	12:45	0:58	30:27	0:32	18:05	1:02:47	8
Jack Howell	PTS5	10:54	0:54	31:20	0:41	10	1:02:21	7
Nic Beveridge	PTWC	12:31	1:29	37:27	0:48	12:56	1:05:11	6
Sam Harding; Guide: Aaron Royle	PTVI	13:40	0:58	29:19	0:34	16:50	1:01:21	5

Women

Athlete	Event	Swim	Trans 1	Bike	Trans 2	Run	Total Time	Rank
Anu Francis	PTS2	14:38	2:03	36:27	1:00	23:40	1:17:48	4
Grace Brimelow	PTS4	11:42	1:07	38:14	0:52	26:29	1:18:24	DSQ
Sally Pilbeam	PTS4	17:45	1:27	37:30	0:30	22:28	1:19:40	7
Lauren Parker	PTWC	13:19	1:48	36:39	0:49	13:48	1:06:23	1st place, gold medalist(s)

== Powerlifting ==
For the first time since 2012, Australia sent two powerlifters based on quotas as of 25 July 2024.

Athlete	Event	Attempts (kg)				Result (kg)	Rank
Athlete	Event	1	2	3	4	Result (kg)	Rank
Ben Wright	Men's 88 kg	184	192	~~195~~	—N/a	192	7
Hani Watson	Women's +86 kg	133	~~138~~	~~140~~	—N/a	133	6

== Rowing ==
Australian rowers qualified boats in each of the following classes at the 2023 World Rowing Championships in Belgrade, Serbia.

Athlete	Event	Heats		Repechage		Final	
Athlete	Event	Time	Rank	Time	Rank	Time	Rank
Erik Horrie	PR1 men's single sculls	10:00.59	3 R	9:22.15	1 FA	9:23.37	4
Jed Altschwager; Nikki Ayers	PR3 mixed double sculls	7:11.30	1 FA	—N/a		7:26.74	1st place, gold medalist(s)
Tom Birtwhistle; Hannah Cowap (C); Tobiah Goffsassen; Susannah Lutze; Alexandra Viney	PR3 mixed coxed four	7:02.74	3 R	6:55.47	1 FA	7:14.78	5

Qualification Legend: FA=Final A (medal); FB=Final B (non-medal); R=Repechage Horrie was awarded the bronze medal due to the disqualification of Giacomo Perini. Court of Arbitration for Sport reinstated Perini and Horrie's result was fourth.

== Shooting ==
Two shooters were selected on 22 July 2024.

Athlete	Event	Qualification		Final	
Athlete	Event	Score	Rank	Score	Rank
Natalie Smith	R2 Women's 10 metre air rifle standing SH1	614.1	12	Did not advance	
Natalie Smith	R8 Women's 50 metre rifle 3 positions SH1	1156-40x	8 Q	396.2	8
Anton Zappelli	R3 Mixed 10 metre air rifle prone SH1	631.9	15	Did not advance	
Anton Zappelli	R6 Mixed 50 metre rifle prone SH1	616.5	18	Did not advance	

== Swimming ==
Paralympics Australia named thirty athletes - fifteen men and fifteen women on 14 June 2024. Eight athletes – four women and four men – were selected to make their Paralympic Games debut.

Key

- Q = Qualified for the next round
- OC = Oceania Record
- PR = Paralympic Games Record
- WR = World Record
- DSQ = Disqualified

Men

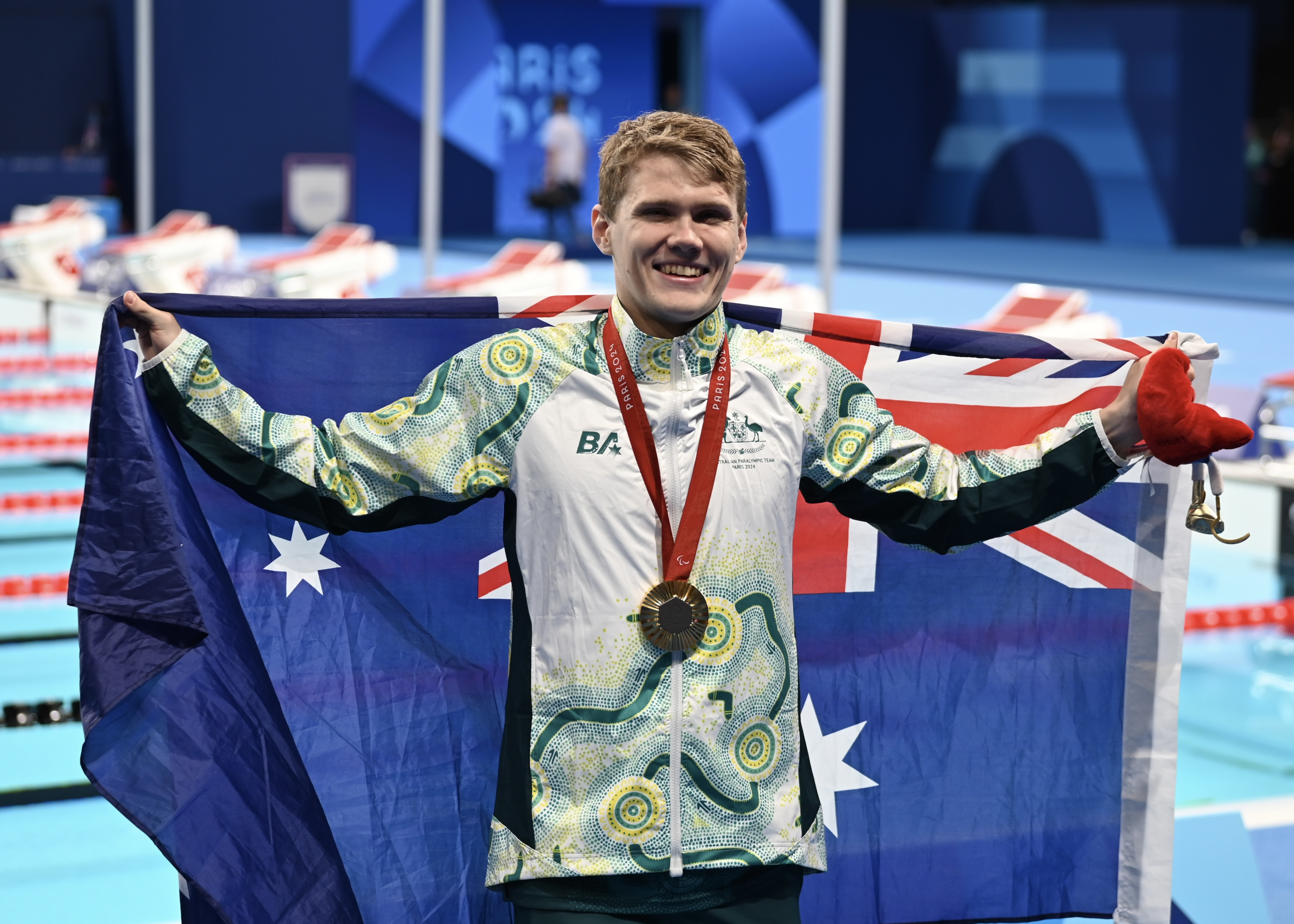
Timothy Hodge after winning the gold medal in the Men's 200 metre individual medley SM9

Athlete	Event	Heats		Final	
Athlete	Event	Result	Rank	Result	Rank
Jesse Aungles	100 m backstroke S8	1:08.87	7 Q	1:08.36	6
Ricky Betar	200 m freestyle S14	2:04.01	10	Did not advance	
Ricky Betar	100 m backstroke S14	1:00.51	5 Q	1:00.33	6
Ricky Betar	200 m individual medley SM14	2:11.41	2 Q	2:08.69	3rd place, bronze medalist(s)
Lewis Bishop	100 m butterfly S9	1:01.5	4 Q	1:01.08	3rd place, bronze medalist(s)
Rowan Crothers	50 m freestyle S10	23.88	4 Q	23.79	3rd place, bronze medalist(s)
Rowan Crothers	100 m freestyle S10	51.51	1 Q	51.55	2nd place, silver medalist(s)
Thomas Gallagher	50 m freestyle S10	23.33	1 Q	23.40	1st place, gold medalist(s)
Thomas Gallagher	100 m freestyle S10	52.70	2 Q	51.86	3rd place, bronze medalist(s)
Thomas Gallagher	100 m backstroke S10	1:03.14	5 Q	1:01.34	3rd place, bronze medalist(s)
Brenden Hall	400 m freestyle S9	4:19.49	2 Q	4:15.61	3rd place, bronze medalist(s)
Brenden Hall	100 m backstroke S9	1:06.90	10	Did not advance	
Brenden Hall	100 m butterfly S9	1:04.36	12	Did not advance	
Benjamin Hance	100 m backstroke S14	56.52 WR	1	57.04	1st place, gold medalist(s)
Benjamin Hance	100 m butterfly S14	55.71	3 Q	56.48	4
Timothy Hodge	100 m butterfly S9	1:00.61	2 Q	1:00.03	2nd place, silver medalist(s)
Timothy Hodge	400 m freestyle S9	4:19.31	1 Q	4:16.17	4
Timothy Hodge	100 m backstroke S9	1:03.02	3 Q	1:02.52	4
Timothy Hodge	100 m breaststroke SB9	1:12.17	5 Q	1:12.11	5
Timothy Hodge	200 m individual medley SM9	2:14.36	1 Q	2:13.31 PR	1st place, gold medalist(s)
Jack Ireland	200 m freestyle S14	1:55.33	3 Q	1:53.77 OC	3rd place, bronze medalist(s)
Ahmed Kelly	50 m backstroke S3	56.97	8 Q	54.96 OC	8
Ahmed Kelly	50 m freestyle S3	52.48	9	Did not advance	
Ahmed Kelly	150 m individual medley SM3	3:08.25	2 Q	3:02.16	2nd place, silver medalist(s)
Jake Michel	100 m breaststroke SB14	1:04.66	1 Q	1:04.27 OC	2nd place, silver medalist(s)
Grant Patterson	200 m freestyle S3	3:56.20	8 Q	3:57.72	8
Grant Patterson	50 m breaststroke SB2	1:03.86	2 Q	1:04.54	3rd place, bronze medalist(s)
Grant Patterson	150 m individual medley SM3	3:07.88	1 Q	3:06.94	3rd place, bronze medalist(s)
Col Pearse	100 m butterfly S10	58.11	2 Q	57.24	4
Col Pearse	200 m individual medley SM10	2:16.19	1 Q	2:12.79	2nd place, silver medalist(s)
Alex Saffy	100 m butterfly S10	58.13	3 Q	56.61 OC	3rd place, bronze medalist(s)
Alex Saffy	100 m freestyle S10	55.12	8 Q	54.55	7
Alex Saffy	200 m individual medley SM10	2:20.22	9	Did not advance	
Callum Simpson	100 m freestyle S8	58.49	1 Q	58.23	1st place, gold medalist(s)
Callum Simpson	400 m freestyle S8	4:35.79	6 Q	4:34.79	6

Women

Athlete	Event	Heats		Final	
Athlete	Event	Result	Rank	Result	Rank
Emily Beecroft	100 m freestyle S9	1:04.12	4 Q	1:03.36	4
Emily Beecroft	100 m butterfly S9	1:08.88	4 Q	1:07.96	3rd place, bronze medalist(s)
Katja Dedekind	50 m freestyle S13	28.23	10	Did not advance	
Jasmine Greenwood	50 m freestyle S10	28.23	7 Q	28.49	8
Jasmine Greenwood	100 m backstroke S10	1:11.93	8 Q	1:10.26	6
Jasmine Greenwood	100 m butterfly S10	1:08.52	4 Q	1:07.35	4
Jasmine Greenwood	200 m individual medley SM10	2:36.59	6 Q	2:34.66	6
Ella Jones	400 m freestyle S8	5:03.74	3 Q	5:02.86	6
Ella Jones	100 m backstroke S8	1:24.48	12	Did not advance	
Jenna Jones	100 m freestyle S12	1:04.21	8 Q	1:04.40	8
Jenna Jones	100 m backstroke S12	1:13.96	5 Q	1:13.81	6
Jenna Jones	100 m breaststroke SB12	1:23.39 OC	5	1:22.04 OC	6
Alexa Leary	50 m freestyle S10	27.69	3 Q	27.79	6
Alexa Leary	100 m freestyle S9	59.60 WR	1 Q	59.53 WR	1st place, gold medalist(s)
Paige Leonhardt	100 m butterfly S14	1:06.73	6 Q	1:07.49	7
Paige Leonhardt	100 m breaststroke SB14	1:17.23	3 Q	1:16.55	4
Paige Leonhardt	200 m individual medley SM14	2:34.98	8 Q	2:35.33	8
Madeleine McTernan	100 m freestyle S14	2:12.71	5 Q	2:12.48	5
Madeleine McTernan	100 m backstroke S14	1:09.99	4 Q	1:09.70	5
Chloe Osborn	100 m freestyle S7	1:13.79	6 Q	1:13.76	7
Chloe Osborn	400 m freestyle S7	5:19.43	3 Q	5:17.69	4
Lakeisha Patterson	100 m freestyle S9	1:05.47	9	Did not advance	
Lakeisha Patterson	400 m freestyle S9	4:48.74	1 Q	4:40.14	2nd place, silver medalist(s)
Lakeisha Patterson	200 m individual medley SM9	2:42.05	7	2:39.99	5
Keira Stephens	50 m freestyle S9	28.36	10	Did not advance	
Keira Stephens	100 m breaststroke SB9	1:18.01	4 Q	1:17.64	4
Keira Stephens	200 m individual medley SM10	2:39.06	8 Q	2:36.28	7
Ruby Storm	100 m butterfly S14	1:09.78	9	Did not advance	
Ruby Storm	200 m freestyle S14	2:15.21	8 Q	2:13.13	7
Ruby Storm	100 m breaststroke SB14	1:21.91	9	Did not advance	
Holly Warn	100 m freestyle S7	1:17.19	14	Did not advance	
Holly Warn	400 m freestyle S7	5:33.35	7 Q	5:26.71	7
Rachael Watson	50 m freestyle S5	41.34 OC	4 Q	41.17 OC	3rd place, bronze medalist(s)
Rachael Watson	100 m freestyle S5	1:37.84 OC	3 Q	1:38.92	3rd place, bronze medalist(s)
Poppy Wilson	100 m freestyle S10	1:03.28	13	Did not advance	
Poppy Wilson	400 m freestyle S10	4:55.99	9	Did not advance	
Poppy Wilson	100 m butterfly S10	1:08.96	5 Q	1:07.52	5

Mixed events

Athletes	Event	Heat		Final	
Athletes	Event	Time	Rank	Time	Rank
Grant Patterson; Ahmed Kelly; Holly Warn; Chloe Osborn	4 x 50 m freestyle 20pts	2:52.55 OC	8 Q	DSQ	
Jack Ireland; Madeleine McTernan; Ruby Storm; Benjamin Hance	4 x 100 m freestyle S14	—N/a		3:46.37	2nd place, silver medalist(s)
Alexa Leary; Callum Simpson; Chloe Osborn; Rowan Crothers	4 x 100 m freestyle 34 pts	—N/a		4:01.90 OC	2nd place, silver medalist(s)
Jesse Aungles; Timothy Hodge; Emily Beecroft; Alexa Leary; Keira Stephens (heat); Callum Simpson (heat)	4 x 100 m medley 34 pts	4:33.32	2 Q	4:27.08 PR	1st place, gold medalist(s)

== Table tennis ==
Australia entered 12 athletes for the Paralympic games. Six of them qualified for Paris 2024 by virtue of their gold medal results, in their respective class, through the 2023 Oceanian Championships in Honiara, Solomon Islands; meanwhile the other athletes qualified through the allocations of ITTF final world ranking.

Men

Athlete	Event	Round of 32	Round of 16	Quarterfinals	Semifinals	Final	
Athlete	Event	Opposition Result	Opposition Result	Opposition Result	Opposition Result	Opposition Result	Rank
Jessy Chen	Individual C3	Baek (KOR); L 0-3	Did not advance				
Chris Addis	Individual C4	—N/a	Chaiwut (THA); L 0-3	Did not advance			
Jimmy Huo	Individual C5	—N/a	Cao (CHN); L 0-3	Did not advance			
Trevor Hirth	Individual C6	—N/a	Parenzan (ITA); L 0-3	Did not advance			
Nathan Pellissier	Individual C8	Csejtey (SVK); L 1-3	Did not advance				
Ma Lin	Individual C9	—N/a		Stacey (GBR); W 3-0	Didier (FRA); L 2-3	—N/a	3rd place, bronze medalist(s)
Samuel Von Einem	Individual C11	—N/a	—N/a	Takemori (JPN); W 3-0	Kim (KOR); L 1-3	—N/a	3rd place, bronze medalist(s)

Women

Athlete	Event	Round of 32	Round of 16	Quarterfinals	Semifinals	Final	
Athlete	Event	Opposition Result	Opposition Result	Opposition Result	Opposition Result	Opposition Result	Rank
Hayley Sands	Individual C1–2	—N/a	—N/a	Buclaw (POL); L 0-3	Did not advance		
Daniela Di Toro	Individual C4	—N/a	Zhou (CHN); L 0-3	Did not advance			
Lei Lina	Individual C9	—N/a	—N/a	Kavas (TUR); W 3-0	Xiong (CHN); L 2-3	—N/a	3rd place, bronze medalist(s)
Yang Qian	Individual C10	—N/a	—N/a	Lin (TPE); W 3-0	Alexandre (BRA); W 3-2	Partyka (POL); W 3-0	1st place, gold medalist(s)
Melissa Tapper	Individual C10	—N/a	—N/a	Alexandre (BRA); L 2-3	Did not advance		

Doubles

Athlete	Event	Round of 32	Round of 16	Quarterfinals	Semifinals	Final	
Athlete	Event	Opposition Result	Opposition Result	Opposition Result	Opposition Result	Opposition Result	Rank
Chris Addis; Jessy Chen	Men's doubles MD8	—N/a	Saito / Shichino (JPN); L 0–3	Did not advance			
Ma Lin; Nathan Pellissier	Men's doubles MD18	—N/a	Boheus / Bouvais (FRA); L 2-3	Did not advance			
Daniela Di Toro; Hayley Sands	Women's doubles WD10	—N/a	Saint-Pierre / Vautier (FRA); L 1-3	Did not advance			
Lei Lina; Yang Qian	Women's doubles WD20	—N/a	—N/a	Liu / Mao (CHN); W 3-0	Alexandre / Rauen (BRA); W 3-0	Lin / Tian (TPE); W 3-1	1st place, gold medalist(s)
Chris Addis; Hayley Sands	Mixed doubles XD7	Flores / Leonelli (CHI); L 0-3	Did not advance				
Jessy Chen; Daniela Di Toro	Mixed doubles XD7	Matthews / Shackelton (GBR); L 1-3	Did not advance				
Nathan Pellissier; Lei Lina	Mixed doubles XD17	—N/a	Zohl / Lucic (CRO); L 2-3	Did not advance			
Trevor Hirth; Melissa Tapper	Mixed doubles XD17	Hansson / Handen (SWE); L 1-3	Did not advance				

== Wheelchair basketball ==
Australia men have qualified to compete at Paris 2024, following the triumph of the nations gold medal results at the 2024 IWBF Asia-Oceania Championships in Bangkok, Thailand.

Summary

Team	Event	Group Stage				Quarterfinal	5th-8th	5th-6th	
Team	Event	Opposition Score	Opposition Score	Opposition Score	Rank	Opposition Score	Opposition Score	Opposition Score	Rank
Australia men's	Men's tournament	Netherlands; L 55–66	Spain; L 60–68	United States; L 69–76	4	Great Britain; L 64–84	Spain; W 78–74	Netherlands; W 82–75	5

Image collections from Men's Wheelchair Basketball Tournament at 2024 Paris Paralympics
Australia v Great Britain, 3 September 2024
Australia v Netherlands, 6 September 2024

=== Men's tournament ===
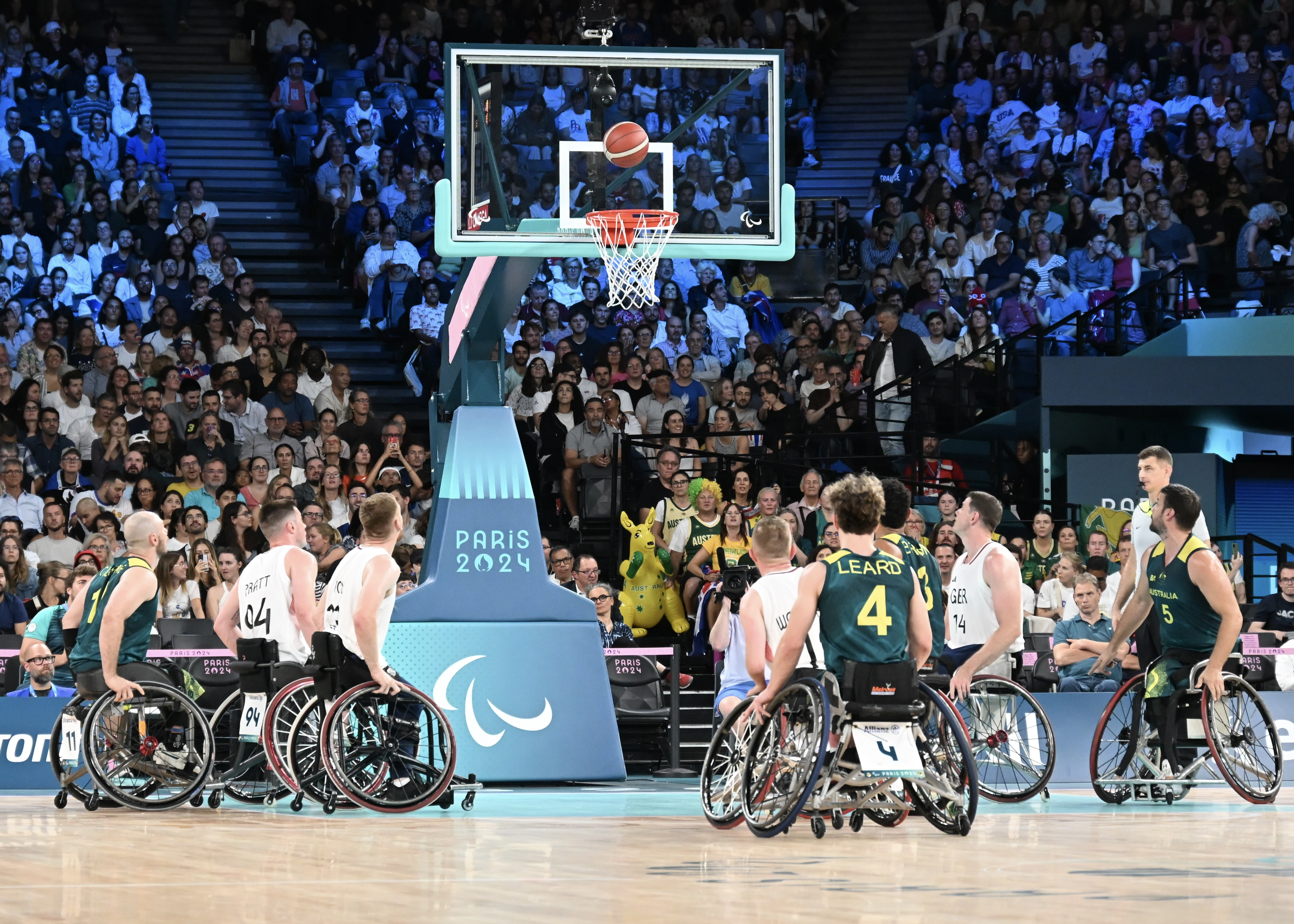
Australian Rollers in action against Great Britain

Roster
The following is the Australia roster in the men's wheelchair basketball tournament of the 2024 Summer Paralympics.

Australia men's national wheelchair basketball team - 2024 Summer Paralympics roster
Players
Coaches

No.	Name	Age – Date of birth	Pts.
1	Samuel White	37 – 19 June 1987	1.0
2	Frank Pinder	23 – 17 December 2000	1
3	Jaylen Brown	19 – 22 December 2004	4
4	Eithen Leard	18 – 31 August 2005	2
5	Bill Latham	34 – 29 October 1989	4.0
7	Shaun Norris	39 – 2 April 1985	3.0
9	Tristan Knowles	41 – 25 April 1983	4.0
10	Jannik Blair	32 – 3 February 1992	1.0
11	Tom O'Neill-Thorne	27 – 8 April 1997	3.0
13	Luke Pople	33 – 6 June 1991	1.5
15	Tom McHugh	22 – 13 March 2002	4.5
18	Phil Evans	33 – 18 September 1990	2

Head coach

Brad Ness

Assistant coach(es)

Brett Stibners, Darren Allie, Luke Mitchell

Legend

- Age - describes age on 29 August 2021

Group B

Pos	Team	Pld	W	L	PF	PA	PD	Pts	Qualification
1	United States	3	3	0	202	159	+43	6	Quarter-finals
2	Spain	3	2	1	192	179	+13	5	Quarter-finals
3	Netherlands	3	1	2	153	183	−30	4	Quarter-finals
4	Australia	3	0	3	184	210	−26	3	Quarter-finals

Source: Paris 2024
Rules for classification: 1) Points; 2) Head-to-head results; 3) Points difference; 4) Points scored.

29 August 2024
21:30

Report

Australia	55–66	Netherlands
Scoring by quarter: 16–12, 14–16, 10–16, 15–22
Pts: Latham 16; Rebs: Latham 13; Asts: Norris, Knowles 5		Pts: Op den Orth 26; Rebs: Op den Orth 12; Asts: Zantinghe 9

Bercy Arena, Paris
Attendance: 11.029
Referees: Sebastien Gauthier

30 August 2024
12:45

Report

Spain	68–60	Australia
Scoring by quarter: 19–12, 14–13, 19–5, 16–30
Pts: Zarzuela 25; Rebs: Zarzuela 9 Asts: Ortega 9		Pts: Brown 22; Rebs: Knowles, Brown 6 Asts: Knowles 8

Bercy Arena, Paris
Attendance: 10.147
Referees: Erik Etzelmueller

1 September 2024
10:30

Report

Australia	69–76	United States
Scoring by quarter: 21–22, 18–23, 18–23, 12–8
Pts: O'Neill-Thorne 14; Rebs: Latham 9 Asts: Leard, Knowles 5		Pts: Williams 24; Rebs: Bell, Fitzpatrick 5 Asts: Serio 9

Bercy Arena, Paris
Attendance: 12.679
Referees: Tomas Pajer

Quarterfinal

3 September 2024
19:15

Report

Great Britain	84–64	Australia
Scoring by quarter: 17-16, 21-19, 18-16, 28-13
Pts: Fox 26; Rebs: Manning 16; Asts: Pratt 18		Pts: Latham 20; Rebs: Latham 7 Asts: Knowles 5

Bercy Arena, Paris
Attendance: 12,652
Referees: Gustavo Mathias

Classification 5th - 8th

4 September 2024
10:30

Report

Spain	74–78	Australia
Scoring by quarter: 24–16, 18–22, 16–21, 16–19
Pts: A. Zarzuela 16; Rebs: A. Zarzuela 8 Asts: P. Zarzuela, Ortega 10		Pts: Latham 33; Rebs: Latham 6 Asts: Norris, O'Neill-Thorne 8

Bercy Arena, Paris
Attendance: 11.430
Referees: Adam Fronczak

Classification 5th - 6th

6 September 2024
19:15

Report

Netherlands	75–82	Australia
Scoring by quarter: 20–22, 18–25, 18–19, 19–16
Pts: Op den Orth 22; Rebs: Op den Orth 13; Asts: Poggenwisch 12		Pts: Knowles 21; Rebs: Latham 8 Asts: Norris 8

Bercy Arena, Paris
Attendance: 12.514
Referees: Yekta Koç

== Wheelchair rugby ==
Australia has qualified to compete at the Paralympic games, by virtue of their top three highest ranked team results, at the 2024 Paralympic Qualification Tournament in Wellington, New Zealand.

Summary

Team	Event	Pool round				Semifinal	Final / BM	
Team	Event	Opposition Result	Opposition Result	Opposition Result	Rank	Opposition Result	Opposition Result	Rank
Australia national team	Mixed tournament	Great Britain; L 55–58	France; W 55–53	Denmark; W 53-49	2	Japan; L 51-52	Great Britain; W 50-48	3rd place, bronze medalist(s)

Image collections from Wheelchair Rugby Tournament at the 2024 Paris Paralympics
Australia v Great Britain, 29 August 2024
Australia v France, 31 August 2024

Team roster

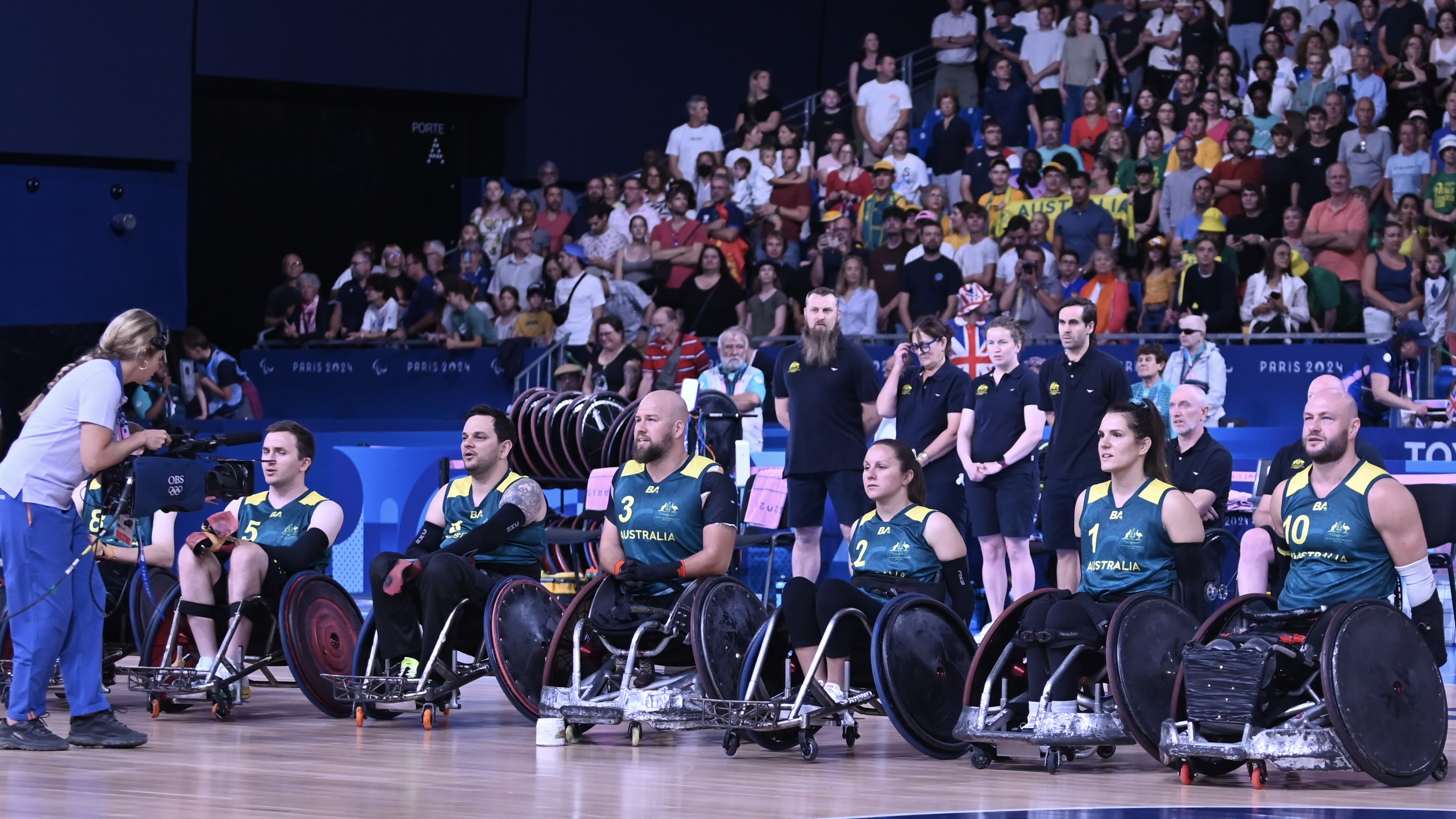
Australian Steelers. Left to right: James McQuillan, Jake Howe, Ryley Batt, Emilie Miller, Ella Sabljak, Chris Bond

On 10 July 2024, Australia selected twelve players.

- Ryley Batt
- Chris Bond
- Ben Fawcett
- Brayden Foxley-Connolly
- Andrew Edmondson
- Shae Graham
- Jake Howe
- Josh Nicholson
- James McQuillan
- Emilie Miller
- Ella Sabljak
- Beau Vernon

Group play

Pos	Team	Pld	W	D	L	GF	GA	GD	Pts	Qualification
1	Great Britain	3	3	0	0	163	157	+6	6	Semi-finals
2	Australia	3	2	0	1	163	160	+3	4	Semi-finals
3	France (H)	3	1	0	2	155	156	−1	2	Placings rounds
4	Denmark	3	0	0	3	153	161	−8	0	Placings rounds

Source: Paris 2024
(H) Hosts
29 August 2020
11:30

Australia	55–58	Great Britain
Ryley Batt – 36; Chris Bond – 12; Beau Vernon – 3 Ella Sabljak – 1 Andrew Edmondson – 1	Report	Aaron Phipps – 25; Stuart Robinson – 23; Gavin Walker – 3 Jonathan Coggan – 2 Jack Smith – 1 Kieran Flynn – 1

Grand Palais Éphémère, Paris

30 August 2024
19:30

Australia	55–53	France
Chris Bond – 27; Ryley Batt – 26; Beau Vernon – 1 Andrew Edmondson – 1	Report	Jonathan Hivernat – 34; Sebastien Verdin – 10; Rodolph Jarlan – 4 Cedric Nankin – 2

Grand Palais Éphémère, Paris

31 August 2024
13:30

Denmark	49–53	Australia
Mark Peters – 22; Sebastian Frederiksen – 11; Leon Jorgensen – 7 Jakob Mortensen – 4 Kaare Momme Nielsen – 3	Report	Ryley Batt – 41; Chris Bond – 11; Beau Vernon – 1

Grand Palais Éphémère, Paris

Semi-finals

1 September 2024
13:30

Japan	52–51	Australia
Daisuke Ikezaki– 17; Yukinobu Ike– 16; Katsuya Hashimoto– 14; Ryuji Kusaba– 2 Seiya Norimatsu– 1 Hitoshi Ogawa– 1	Report	Ryley Batt – 22; Chris Bond – 18; Beau Vernon – 5 Ella Sabljak – 2 Andrew Edmondson – 2

Grand Palais Éphémère, Paris

Bronze medal match

2 September 2024
13:30

Australia	50–48	Great Britain
Ryley Batt – 28; Chris Bond – 15; Beau Vernon – 3 Andrew Edmondson – 2	Report	Stuart Robinson – 28; Aaron Phipps – 14; Jack Smith – 3 Jamie Stead – 1

Grand Palais Éphémère, Paris

== Wheelchair tennis ==
Three players selected on 5 August 2024. Heath Davidson withdrew on 26 August 2024 due to an illness in his family.

Athlete	Event	Round of 64	Round of 32	Round of 16	Quarterfinals	Semifinals	Final / BM	
Athlete	Event	Opposition Result	Opposition Result	Opposition Result	Opposition Result	Opposition Result	Opposition Result	Rank
Anderson Parker	Men's singles	Casco (ARG); L 5–7, 4–6	Did not advance					=33
Ben Weekes	Men's singles	Rodrigues (BRA); L 0–6, 1–6	Did not advance					=33
Anderson Parker; Ben Weekes	Men's doubles	—N/a	Carneiro / Rodrigues (BRA); L 5–7, 6–2, [8–10]	Did not advance				=17

== Facts ==
- Paralympics Games representation: Eight - Daniela di Toro (tennis / table tennis); Seven – Angie Ballard (athletics); Six - Lei Li Na (table tennis), Tristan Knowles (wheelchair basketball), Shaun Norris (wheelchair basketball), Ryley Batt (wheelchair rugby) Ben Weekes (wheelchair tennis)
- Sixty one athletes made their Paralympic Games debut.
- Indigenous athletes – Amanda Reid (cycling), Ruby Storm (swimming), Telaya Blacksmith (athletics) and Samantha Schmidt (athletics)
- Youngest – Holly Warn (swimming) and oldest Jimmy Huo (table tennis player born in 1955)
- Dual Paralympian and Olympian – Melissa Tapper (table tennis)
- Multiple Paralympic sports representation – Daniela di Toro (tennis / table tennis), Amanda Reid (swimming / cycling), A J Jennings (canoeing / archery), Jessica Gallagher (athletics / skiing / cycling), Ella Sabljak (wheelchair basketball / wheeelchair rugby). At the 2024 Games, Lauren Parker will be competing in triathlon and road cycling.
- Families - brothers Chad Perris (athletics) and Kane Perris (track cycling); Taylor Gosens (judo) joins father Gerrad Gosens (goalball / athletics); Tom Goodman's (triathlon) sister Molly Goodman competed at the Olympics.
- Represented other Paralympic nations – Ma Lin, Lei Li Na, Yang Qian (All represented China in table tennis), Vanessa Low (represented Germany in athletics)
- Seventeen Australian team athletes won multiple medals.
- Lauren Parker won a gold medal in two distinct sports - triathlon and cycling.
- Six dual gold medallists: Alexa Leary (swimming), Callum Simpson (swimming), Lauren Parker (triathlon/cycling) and Tim Hodge (swimming) each won two gold medals and a silver medal; Qian Yang (table tennis), James Turner (athletics) each won two gold medals.
- Several athletes repeated their event performance from Tokyo Paralympics: James Turner (athletics 400 m T36), Vanessa Low (athletics long jump T63), Curtis McGrath (canoeing Kl2), Amanda Reid (track cycling time trial C1–3 ), Emily Petricola (track cycling C4 3000m individual pursuit), Benjamin Hance (swimming backstroke S14) and Qian Yang (table tennis singles 10). James Turner, Vanessa Low and Curtis McGrath went on to win gold medals at three successive Paralympic Games.
- Australia won medals in nine sports: boccia, athletics, canoe, cycling, rowing, swimming, table tennis, triathlon and wheelchair rugby.

== See also ==
- Australia at the 2024 Summer Olympics

== Bibliography ==
- Paralympics Australia Media Guide Paris 2024 Paralympic Games (PDF). Paralympics Australia. 2024.
