= Para powerlifting at the 2022 Commonwealth Games – Qualification =

There was a nominal total of 40 quota places available for para powerlifting at the 2022 Commonwealth Games; 20 each for men and women.

== Rules ==
Each Commonwealth Games Association (CGA) may qualify up to two entries per weight category, which equates to a maximum quota of eight powerlifters. Those entered may contest one category only.

Eight places per category are determined by the World Para Powerlifting (WPPO) Commonwealth Rankings (as of 25 April 2022), with two additional places per category determined by CGF/WPPO Bipartite Invitations.

== Timeline ==
Event	Dates	Location
World Para Powerlifting Commonwealth Rankings	1 January 2020 – 25 April 2022	Various locations

== Men's events ==
=== Lightweight (up to 72 kg) ===
Means of qualification	Quotas	Qualified
WPPO Commonwealth Rankings	8	Bonnie Bunyau Gustin (MAS); Nnamdi Innocent (NGR); Thomas Kure (NGR); Mark Swan (ENG); Parmjeet Kumar (IND); Emmanuel Nii Tettey Oku (GHA); Matthew Harding (ENG); Conrat Atangana (CMR)
Bipartite Invitation	2	Richard Lubanza (ZAM); Yohana Mwila (TAN)
TOTAL	10	

=== Heavyweight (over 72 kg) ===
Means of qualification	Quotas	Qualified
WPPO Commonwealth Rankings	8	Jong Yee Khie (MAS); Ikechukwu Obichukwu (NGR); Abdulazeez Ibrahim (NGR); Micky Yule (SCO); Sudhir (IND); Ben Wright (AUS); Liam McGarry (ENG); Oscar Ernest Makoube Moussima (CMR)
Bipartite Invitation	2	Modou Gamo (GAM); Denis Mbaziira (UGA)
TOTAL	10	

== Women's events ==
=== Lightweight (up to 61 kg) ===
Means of qualification	Quotas	Qualified
WPPO Commonwealth Rankings	8	Onyinyechi Mark (NGR); Latifat Tijani (NGR); Olivia Broome (ENG); Zoe Newson (ENG); Hellen Wawira (KEN); Sakina Khatun (IND); Manpreet Kaur (IND); Nur'Aini Mohamad Yasli (SGP)
Bipartite Invitation	2	Suzanne Menye Meto (CMR); Kimberley Dean (IOM)
TOTAL	10	

=== Heavyweight (over 61 kg) ===
Means of qualification	Quotas	Qualified
WPPO Commonwealth Rankings	8	Folashade Oluwafemiayo (NGR); Bose Omolayo (NGR); Louise Sugden (ENG); Hani Watson (AUS); Vida Antwi (GHA); Joyce Wambui Njuguna (KEN); Rebecca Bedford (ENG); Geeta (IND)
Bipartite Invitation	2	Elie Enock (VAN); Thamar Gisele Mengue (CMR)
TOTAL	10	
