= Para powerlifting at the 2026 Commonwealth Games – Women's heavyweight =

Para powerlifting – Women's heavyweight at the 2026 Commonwealth Games
- Venue: SEC Centre
- Dates: 24 July 2026
- Competitors: 12 from 10 nations

Medalists
| gold medal | Folashade Oluwafemiayo | Nigeria |
| silver medal | Rita Ferdinand | Nigeria |
| bronze medal | Hani Watson | Australia |

The Women's heavyweight powerlifting event at the 2026 Commonwealth Games took place at the SEC Centre on 24 July 2026.

== Schedule ==
All times are British Summer Time (UTC+1)

| Date | Time | Round |
|---|---|---|
| Friday 24 July 2026 | 18:10 | Final |

== Result ==
| Rank | Athlete | Group | Body weight | #1 | #2 | #3 | Result |
|---|---|---|---|---|---|---|---|
| 1st place, gold medalist(s) | Folashade Oluwafemiayo (NGR) | A | 106.0 | 165 | 172 | 175 WR | 134.8 |
| 2nd place, silver medalist(s) | Rita Ferdinand (NGR) | A | 77.6 | ~~150~~ | 150 | 158 WR | 128.2 |
| 3rd place, bronze medalist(s) | Hani Watson (AUS) | A | 121.8 | 140 | 144 | 147 | 111.5 |
| 4 | Louise Sugden (ENG) | A | 82.7 | 128 | 133 | ~~137~~ | 106.5 |
| 5 | Thamar Mengue (CMR) | B | 70.3 | 104 | 110 | 113 | 93.8 |
| 6 | Doaa Sheyea (ENG) | A | 64.9 | 104 | 108 | 110 | 93.3 |
| 7 | Joyce Njuguna (KEN) | B | 78.6 | 107 | 110 | 114 | 92.2 |
| 8 | Maria Markou (CYP) | B | 66.2 | 103 | 106 | ~~109~~ | 89.4 |
| 9 | Hope Gordon (SCO) | B | 66.7 | 82 | 86 | 90 | 75.7 |
| 10 | Rebecca Zawedde (UGA) | B | 85.7 | ~~78~~ | 80 | ~~82~~ | 63.6 |
| 11 | Marek Sahi (VAN) | B | 63.8 | ~~56~~ | ~~56~~ | 60 | 51.1 |
| — | Kasthuri Rajamani (IND) | A | 65.5 | ~~111~~ | ~~111~~ | ~~112~~ | DNF |
