= Para powerlifting at the 2022 Commonwealth Games – Women's heavyweight =

Para powerlifting – Women's heavyweight at the 2022 Commonwealth Games
- Venue: National Exhibition Centre
- Dates: 4 August
- Competitors: 8 from 7 nations
- Winning points: 123.4

Medalists
gold medal	Folashade Oluwafemiayo	Nigeria
silver medal	Bose Omolayo	Nigeria
bronze medal	Hani Watson	Australia

The Women's heavyweight powerlifting event at the 2022 Commonwealth Games took place at the National Exhibition Centre on 4 August 2022.

== Schedule ==
All times are British Summer Time (UTC+1)

Date	Time	Round
Thursday 4 August 2022	19:30	Final

== Result ==
Rank	Athlete	Body weight (kg)	#1	#2	#3	Result
1st place, gold medalist(s)	Folashade Oluwafemiayo (NGR)	85.30	130	150	155	123.4; WR, GR
2nd place, silver medalist(s)	Bose Omolayo (NGR)	77.60	125	142	~~145~~	115.2
3rd place, bronze medalist(s)	Hani Watson (AUS)	100.80	120	~~125~~	127	98.5
4	Thamar Gisele Mengue (CMR)	75.80	96	~~102~~	105	85.6
5	Joyce Wambui Njuguna (KEN)	78.20	100	~~103~~	103	83.4
6	Rebecca Bedford (ENG)	62.00	91	94	~~96~~	80.8
7	Vida Antwi (GHA)	65.70	88	~~95~~	~~97~~	74.4
8	Elie Enock (VAN)	99.40	~~68~~	~~68~~	68	52.8
-	Louise Sugden (ENG)	-	—			DNS
-	Geeta (IND)	-	—			DNS
