= Powerlifting at the 2012 Summer Paralympics – Women's 75 kg =

Powerlifting – Women's 75 kg at the XIV Paralympic Games
- Venue: ExCeL London
- Date: 3 September 2012
- Competitors: 8 from 8 nations
- Winning lift: 146.0 kg

Medalists
1st place, gold medalist(s)		Taoying Fu; China
2nd place, silver medalist(s)		Folashade Oluwafemiayo; Nigeria
3rd place, bronze medalist(s)		Lin Tzu-hui; Chinese Taipei

The women's 75 kg powerlifting event at the 2012 Summer Paralympics was contested on 3 September at ExCeL London.

== Records ==
Prior to the competition, the existing world and Paralympic records were as follows.

World record	145.0 kg	Liping Zhang (CHN)	Busan, South Korea	10 May 2006
Paralympic record	140.0 kg	Ruifang Li (CHN)	Sydney, Australia	22 October 2000

== Results ==
Rank	Name	Body weight (kg)	Attempts (kg)				Result (kg)
Rank	Name	Body weight (kg)	1	2	3	4	Result (kg)
1st place, gold medalist(s)	Taoying Fu (CHN)	72.53	138.0	~~142.0~~	146.0	–	146.0
2nd place, silver medalist(s)	Folashade Oluwafemiayo (NGR)	74.17	140.0	143.0	146.0	–	146.0
3rd place, bronze medalist(s)	Lin Tzu-hui (TPE)	71.76	137.0	~~141.0~~	~~143.0~~	–	137.0
4	Amany Ali (EGY)	72.12	122.0	~~127.0~~	~~127.0~~	–	122.0
5	Alshikh Rasha (SYR)	74.07	103.0	110.0	~~123.0~~	–	110.0
6	Marzena Lazarz (POL)	74.01	106.0	~~111.0~~	~~111.0~~	–	106.0
7	Jennet Orjiyeva (TKM)	73.63	80.0	~~85.0~~	85.0	–	85.0
–	Josilene Ferreira (BRA)	74.57	~~106.0~~	~~106.0~~	~~107.0~~	–	NMR

Key: PR=Paralympic record; WR=World record; NMR=No marks recorded
