= Powerlifting at the 2020 Summer Paralympics – Women's 86 kg =

Powerlifting – Women's 86 kg at the XVI Paralympic Games
- Venue: Tokyo International Forum
- Date: 30 August 2021
- Competitors: 8 from 8 nations

Medalists
1st place, gold medalist(s)		Folashade Oluwafemiayo	Nigeria
2nd place, silver medalist(s)		Zheng Feifei	China
3rd place, bronze medalist(s)		Louise Sugden	Great Britain

The women's 86 kg powerlifting event at the 2020 Summer Paralympics was contested on 30 August at Tokyo International Forum.

== Records ==
There are twenty powerlifting events, corresponding to ten weight classes each for men and women. Prior to this competition, the existing world and Paralympic records were as follows.

World Record	Folashade Oluwafemiayo (NGR)	150.5 kg	Manchester, Great Britain	28 March 2021
Paralympic Record	Randa Mahmoud (EGY)	130 kg	Rio de Janeiro, Brazil	13 September 2016

== Results ==
Rank	Name	Body weight (kg)	Attempts (kg)				Result (kg)
Rank	Name	Body weight (kg)	1	2	3	4	Result (kg)
1st place, gold medalist(s)	Folashade Oluwafemiayo (NGR)	84.89	147	149	151	152 WR, PR	151
2nd place, silver medalist(s)	Zheng Feifei (CHN)	80.94	135	139	~~149~~	–	139
3rd place, bronze medalist(s)	Louise Sugden (GBR)	84.25	127	~~131~~	131	–	131
4	Amany Ali (EGY)	85.30	131	~~133~~	~~133~~	–	131
5	Tayana Medeiros (BRA)	84.88	121	~~128~~	~~131~~	–	121
6	Marion Serrano (CHI)	83.81	114	117	~~121~~	–	117
7	Lee Young-sun (KOR)	82.14	90	~~95~~	~~95~~	–	90
	Tharwh Al-Hajaj (JOR)	84.28	~~115~~	~~121~~	~~121~~	–	NM
	Hanan Al-Majidi (IRQ)	84.44	~~112~~	~~112~~	~~112~~	–	NM
