= Powerlifting at the 2014 Commonwealth Games – Women's +61 kg =

Powerlifting – Women's +61 kg at the 2014 Commonwealth Games
- Venue: Clyde Auditorium
- Dates: 2 August 2014
- Competitors: 5 from 4 nations
- Winning total weight: 122.4kg

Medalists
gold medal	Loveline Obiji	Nigeria
silver medal	Bose Omolayo	Nigeria
bronze medal	Joyce Wambui Njuguna	Kenya

The Women's +61 kg para-sport powerlifting event at the 2014 Commonwealth Games in Glasgow, Scotland, took place at Scottish Exhibition and Conference Centre on 2 August. The weightlifter from Nigeria won the gold.

== Result ==
Rank	Athlete	#1	#2	#3	Result	Notes
1st place, gold medalist(s)	Loveline Obiji (NGR)	130	140	144	122.4	
2nd place, silver medalist(s)	Bose Omolayo (NGR)	~~125~~	127	~~132~~	113.4	
3rd place, bronze medalist(s)	Joyce Wambui Njuguna (KEN)	70	75	~~80~~	68.6	
4	Jessica Gray (AUS)	60	~~64~~	~~72~~	57.3	
	Vaster Kyalimpa (UGA)	~~48~~	~~48~~	~~48~~	DNF	
