= Swimming at the 2024 Summer Paralympics – Men's 50 metre freestyle S10 =

Men's 50 metre freestyle S10 at the XVII Paralympic Games
- Venue: Paris La Défense Arena
- Dates: 29 August 2024
- Competitors: 12 from 11 nations
- Winning time: 23.40

Medalists
| 1st place, gold medalist(s) | | Thomas Gallagher | Australia |
| 2nd place, silver medalist(s) | | Phelipe Rodrigues | Brazil |
| 3rd place, bronze medalist(s) | | Rowan Crothers | Australia |

The men's 50 metre freestyle swimming event (S10) event at the 2024 Summer Paralympics took place on Thursday 29 August 2024, at the La Défense Arena in Paris. The heats took place at 10.51 a.m.

== Heats ==
The swimmers with the top eight times, regardless of heat, advanced to the final.

| Rank | Heat | Lane | Name | Nationality | Time | Notes |
|---|---|---|---|---|---|---|
| 1 | 1 | 4 | Thomas Gallagher | Australia | 23.33 | Q |
| 2 | 2 | 3 | Stefano Raimondi | Italy | 23.77 | Q |
| 3 | 2 | 5 | Phelipe Rodrigues | Brazil | 23.78 | Q |
| 4 | 2 | 4 | Rowan Crothers | Australia | 23.88 | Q |
| 5 | 1 | 5 | Ihor Nimchenko | Ukraine | 24.62 | Q |
| 5 | 2 | 6 | Dmitry Grigoryev | Neutral Paralympic Athletes | 24.62 | Q |
| 7 | 1 | 2 | Zeiad Tarek Hasby | Egypt | 24.75 | Q, AF |
| 8 | 1 | 6 | Fernando Lu | Canada | 25.02 | Q |
| 9 | 1 | 3 | Yaseen El-Demerdash | United States | 25.29 | R |
| 10 | 2 | 2 | David Levecq | Spain | 25.31 | R |
| 11 | 2 | 7 | Alan Ogorzalek | Poland | 25.65 | |
| 12 | 1 | 7 | Akito Minai | Japan | 25.82 | |

Q : qualified for final AF African Record

== Final ==
The final took place on the same day, at 19.41:

| Rank | Lane | Name | Nationality | Time | Notes |
|---|---|---|---|---|---|
| 1st place, gold medalist(s) | 4 | Thomas Gallagher | Australia | 23.40 | |
| 2nd place, silver medalist(s) | 3 | Phelipe Rodrigues | Brazil | 23.54 | |
| 3rd place, bronze medalist(s) | 6 | Rowan Crothers | Australia | 23.79 | |
| 4 | 5 | Stefano Raimondi | Italy | 23.92 | |
| 5 | 2 | Ihor Nimchenko | Ukraine | 24.16 | |
| 6 | 7 | Dmitry Grigoryev | Neutral Paralympic Athletes | 24.62 | |
| 7 | 8 | Fernando Lu | Canada | 24.84 | |
| 8 | 1 | Zeiad Tarak Hasby | Egypt | 24.89 | |
