= Cycling at the 2024 Summer Paralympics – Women's road race =

The women's road race cycling events at the 2024 Summer Paralympics took place from September 5 to 7 in Clichy-sous-Bois, Paris. Six events took place, spanning over twelve classifications.

== Classification ==
Cyclists are given a classification depending on the type and extent of their disability. The classification system allows cyclists to compete against others with a similar level of function. The class number indicates the severity of impairment with "1" being most impaired.

Cycling classes are:

- B: Blind and visually impaired cyclists use a Tandem bicycle with a sighted pilot on the front
- H 1–4: Cyclists with an impairment that affects their legs use a handcycle
- T 1–2: Cyclists with an impairment that affects their balance use a tricycle
- C 1-5: Cyclists with an impairment that affects their legs, arms, and/or trunk but are capable of using a standard bicycle

== Schedule ==
F	Finals

Women's Road Race
Event↓/Date →	5 September	6 September	7 September
B		F	
H1-4	F		
H5	F		
C1-3			F
C4-5		F	
T1-2			F

== Medal table ==
* Host nation (France)

Rank	NPC	Gold	Silver	Bronze	Total
1	Great Britain	2	0	1	3
2	United States	1	0	1	2
3	Australia	1	0	0	1
3	Denmark	1	0	0	1
3	Japan	1	0	0	1
6	Switzerland	0	2	0	2
7	Netherlands	0	1	1	2
8	China	0	1	0	1
8	France*	0	1	0	1
8	Ireland	0	1	0	1
11	Colombia	0	0	1	1
11	Germany	0	0	1	1
11	Italy	0	0	1	1
Totals (13 entries)		6	6	6	18

== Medal summary ==
Classification	Gold		Silver		Bronze	
Road races
B	Sophie Unwin; Pilot: Jenny Holl; Great Britain	2:37:26	Katie-George Dunlevy; Pilot: Linda Kelly; Ireland	2:37:29	Lora Fachie; Pilot: Corrine Hall; Great Britain	2:39:01
H1-4	Lauren Parker; Australia	52:04	Jennette Jansen; Netherlands	56:15	Annika Zeyen-Giles; Germany	56:15
H5	Oksana Masters; United States	1:52:14	Sun Bianbian; China	1:52:25	Ana Maria Vitelaru; Italy	1:52:27
C1-3	Keiko Sugiura; Japan	1:38:48	Flurina Rigling; Switzerland	1:38:48	Clara Brown; United States	1:38:48
C4-5	Sarah Storey; Great Britain	1:54:24	Heïdi Gaugain; France	1:54:24	Paula Ossa; Colombia	1:54:44
T1-2	Emma Lund; Denmark	1:00:16	Celine van Till; Switzerland	1:00:16	Marieke van Soest; Netherlands	1:00:16
