= Hayley Sands =

Australian para table tennis player

Personal information
- Nationality: Australian
- Born: 13 March 2000 (age 26)

Sport
- Country: Australia
- Sport: Table Tennis
- Club: Woodville District Table Tennis Club

Hayley Sands (born 13 March 2000) is an Australian Paralympic table tennis player. She competed at the 2024 Paris Paralympics.

== Personal ==
Sands was born on 13 March 2000. On January 2, 2013, at the age of thirteen, a diving accident the family swimming pool in Kings Park, South Australia resulted in a C4/C5 incomplete spinal cord injury. Sands spent eight months recovering at the Women's and Children's Hospital in South Australia. She attended Cabra Dominican College. Sands has completed an interior architecture degree at the University of South Australia. In 2024, she is an Interior Designer at Woods Bagot.

== Table tennis ==
Sands was introduced to table tennis at a Paralympics Australia Come and Try Day. She is classified as class 2 player. She first represented Australia in Thailand in 2019. She competed at the 2023 Oceania Para Championships in the women's singles class 2–5.

She competed at the 2024 Paris Paralympics in the Women's Singles 1-2, Women's Doubles 18 and Mixed Doubles 7 but did not progress after losing opening matches.

In 2024, she is a South Australian Sports Institute athlete.
