= Tristan Knowles =

Australian wheelchair basketball player

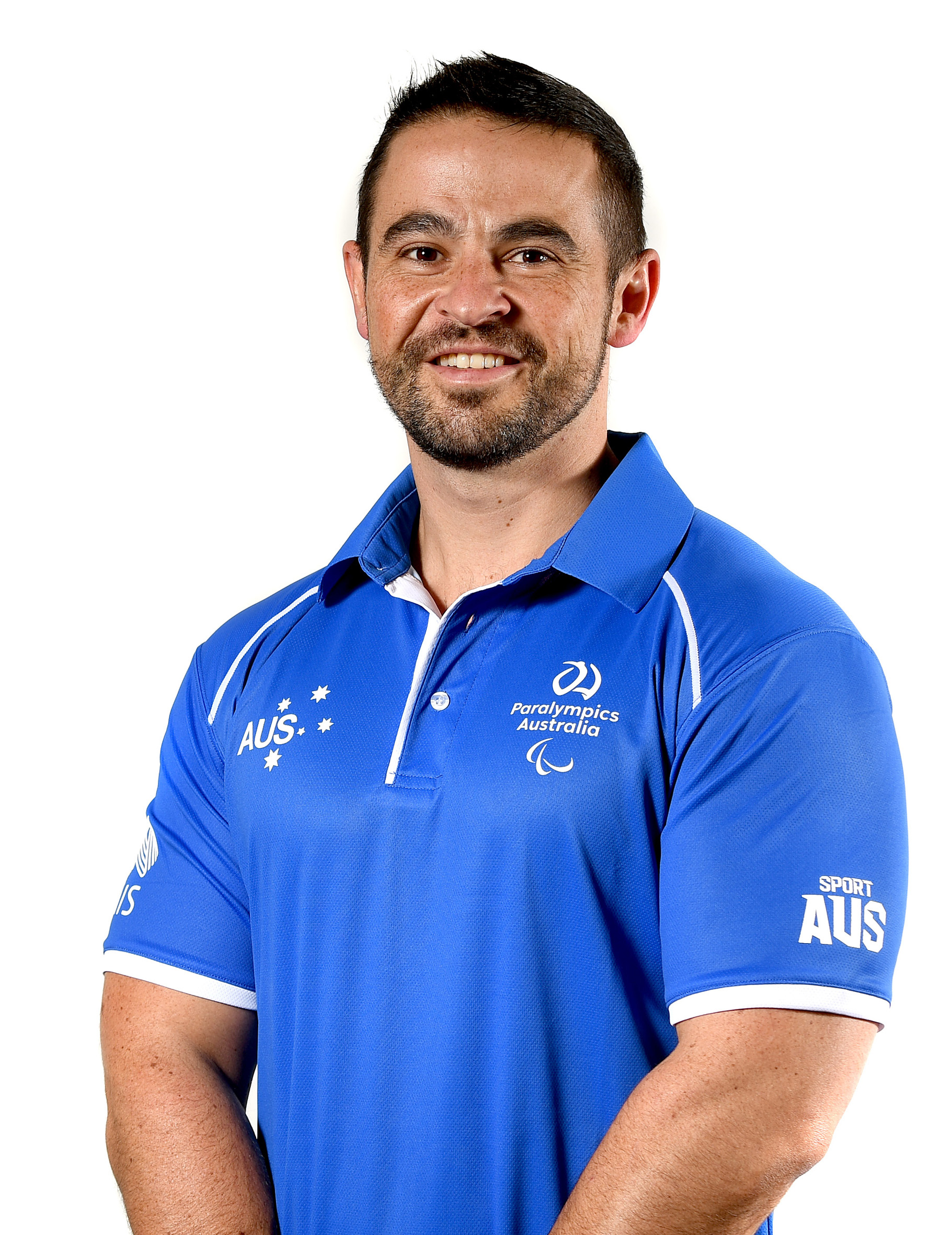
- Tristan Knowles in 2019

Personal information
- Full name: Tristan Malcolm Knowles
- Nationality: Australia

Sport
- Club: Wollongong Roller Hawks
Medal record
Wheelchair basketball
Paralympic Games
| Silver medal – second place | 2004 Athens | Men's wheelchair basketball |
| Gold medal – first place | 2008 Beijing | Men's wheelchair basketball |
| Silver medal – second place | 2012 London | Men's wheelchair basketball |
World Championship
| Bronze medal – third place | 2006 Amsterdam | Team |
| Gold medal – first place | 2010 Birmingham | Team |
| Gold medal – first place | 2014 Incheon | Team |
| Gold medal – first place | 2026 Ottawa | Team |
| Bronze medal – third place | 2018 Hamburg | Team |

Tristan Malcolm Knowles, OAM (born 25 April 1983) is an Australian wheelchair basketball player and won a gold medal at the 2008 Beijing Paralympics and silver medals at the 2004 Athens and 2012 London Paralympics. He was a member of the Roller at the 2024 Paris Paralympics, his sixth Games.

== Personal ==
Knowles was born on 25 April 1983 in Wodonga, Victoria. He became an above the knee amputee as a result of cancer. He went to the University of Wollongong where he earned a degree in commerce. When not playing basketball, he is a financial planning manager with the Commonwealth Bank. He established the Tristan Knowles Kids Cancer Foundation.

== Basketball ==
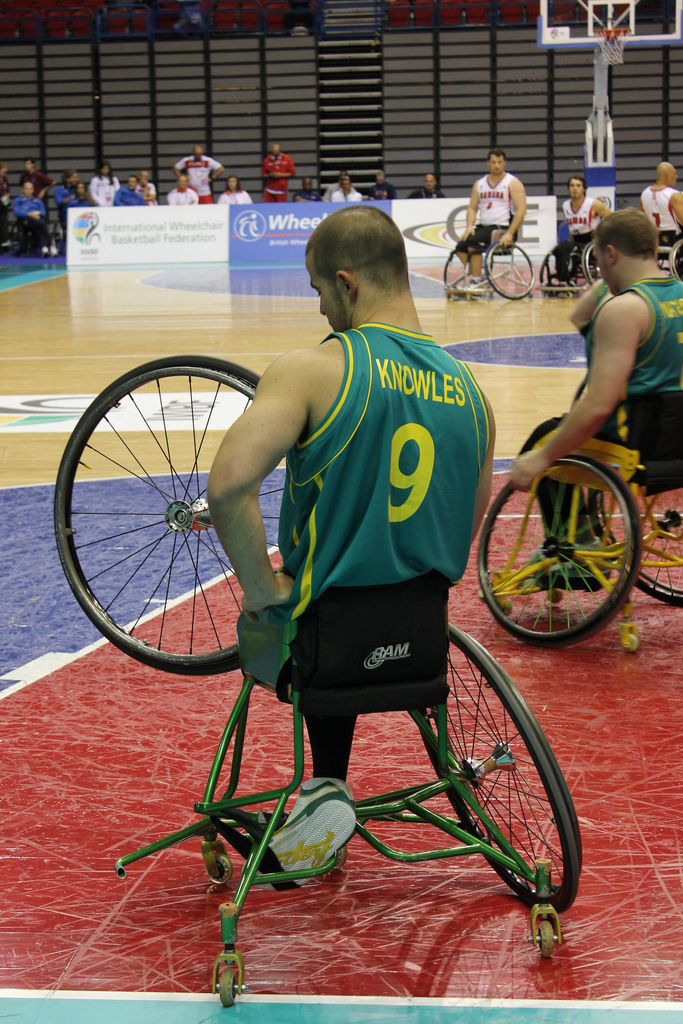
Tristan Knowles swaps a wheel mid-match during the 2010 World Wheelchair Basketball Championship.

Knowles first played wheelchair basketball in 1999. He is a 4 point player and plays in the guard-forward position.

=== State team ===
Knowles played for the New South Wales U21 state team in the national competition. The state U21 team won the national championships four years in a row with Knowles as the captain.

=== National team ===
Knowles's first appearance on the national team was in 2001.

==== Paralympics ====
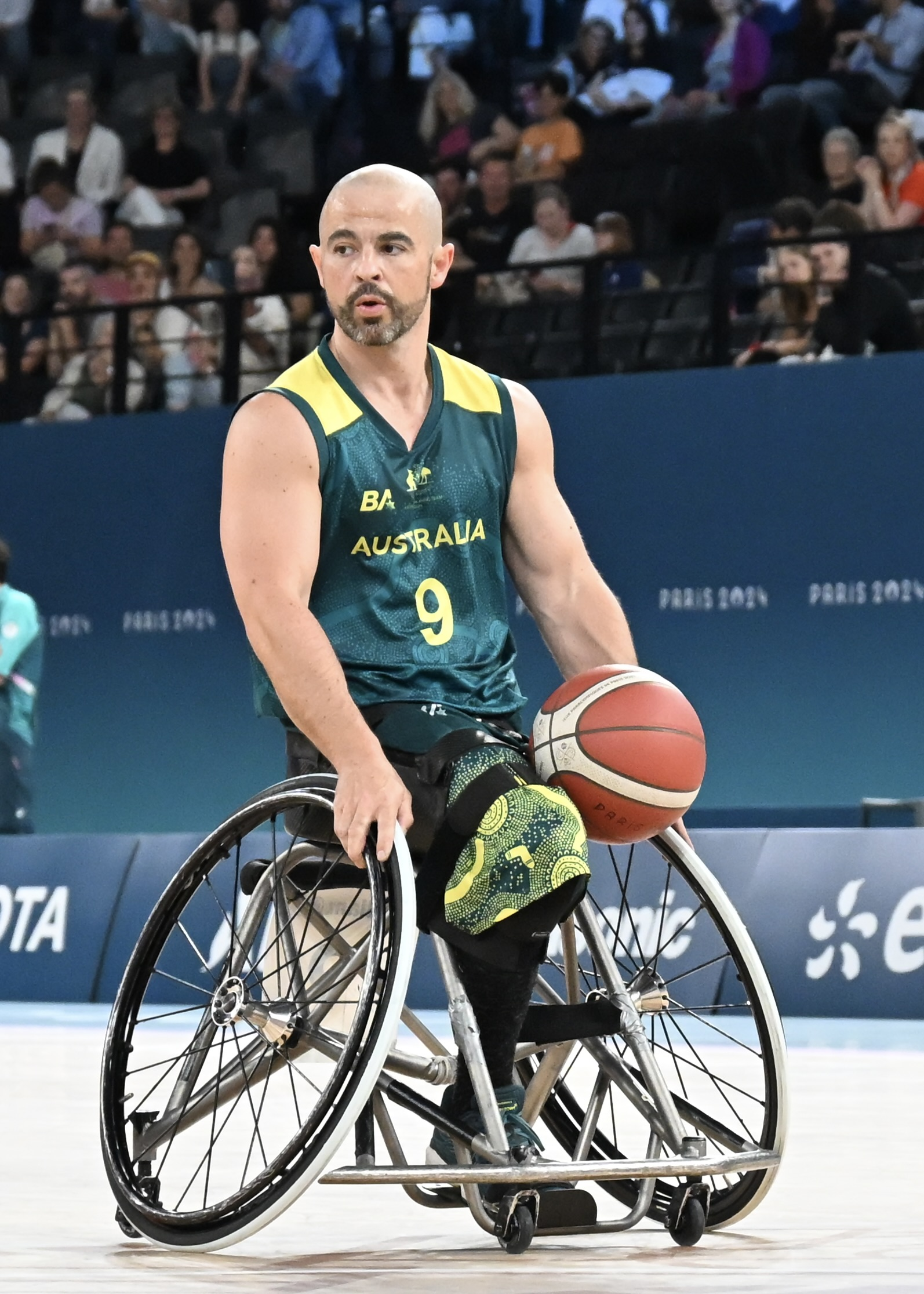
Knowles at the 2024 Paris Paralympics

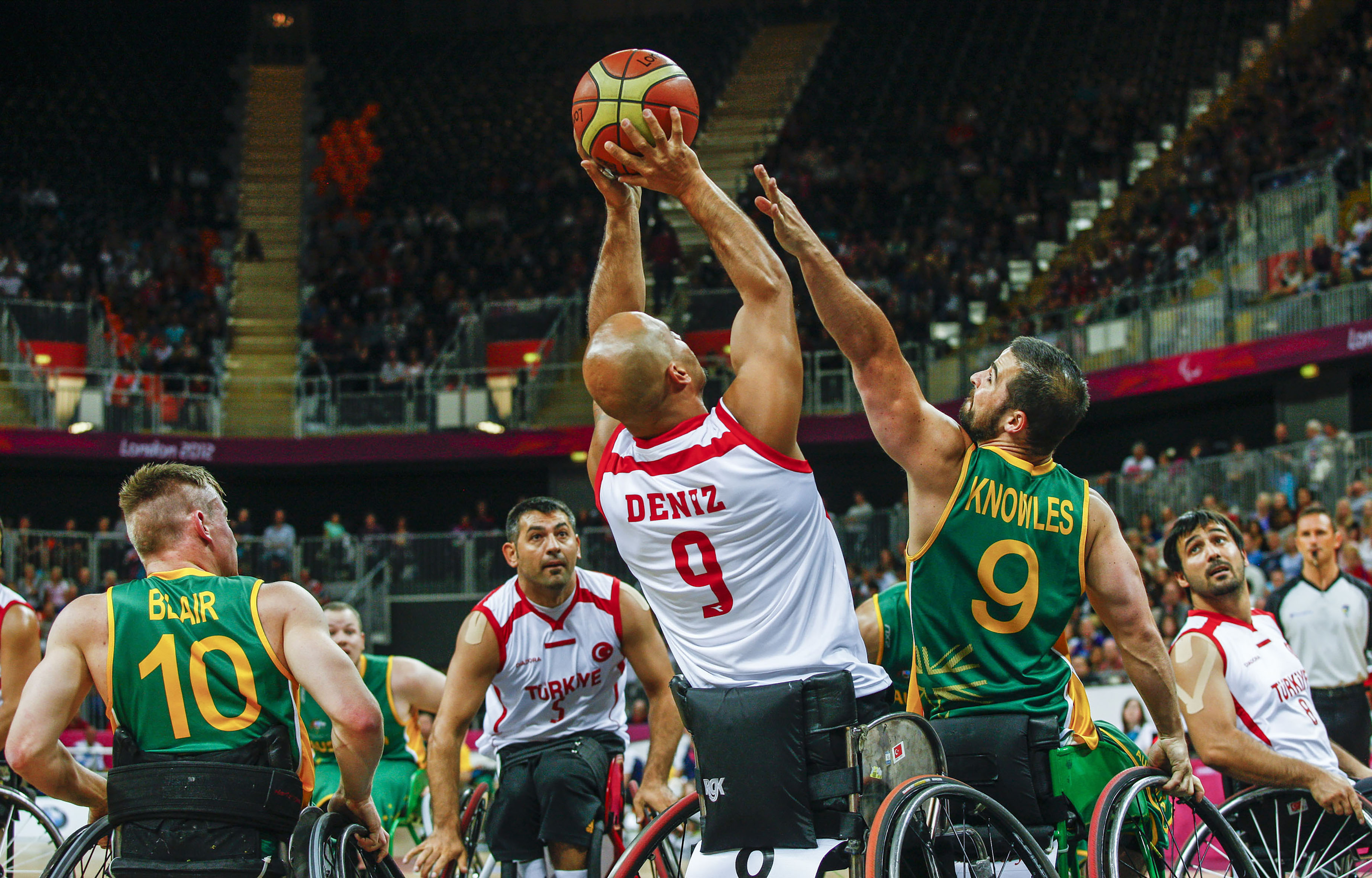
Knowles at the 2012 London Paralympics

Knowles was part of the silver medal-winning Australia men's national wheelchair basketball team at the 2004 Summer Paralympics. He was also part of the gold medal-winning Australia men's national wheelchair basketball team at the 2008 Summer Paralympics, for which he received a Medal of the Order of Australia.

In October 2011, Knowles was named as part of the senior national squad that would compete at the Paralympic qualifying tournament for the 2012 Summer Paralympics. At the 2012 Summer Paralympics he was part of the Australian men's wheelchair team that won silver. In 2016, he was selected for the 2016 Summer Paralympics in Rio de Janeiro, his fourth games, where his team, The Rollers, finished sixth.

At the 2020 Tokyo Paralympics, the Rollers finished fifth with a win–loss record of 4–4. At the 2024 Paris Paralympics, he was a member of the Rollers that finished fifth with a win/loss record of 3-3.

==== World Championships ====
Knowles was part of the 2006 national squad that finished third at the World Championships. In 2009, he was part of the national side that competed at the Rollers World Challenge. In the match against Japan, he scored 15 points. He was a member of the Australia men's national wheelchair basketball team that won the gold medal at the 2010 Wheelchair Basketball World Championship and 2014 Wheelchair Basketball World Championships. In 2018, he was a member of the Rollers that won the bronze medal at 2018 Wheelchair Basketball World Championship in Hamburg, Germany.

He was a member of the Rollers that won the gold medal at the 2026 Wheelchair Basketball World Championships in Ottawa, Canada.

=== Club basketball ===
Knowles has played professional wheelchair basketball in Australia, Spain and Italy. As of 2011 has played with the Wollongong Roller Hawks for 11 years. When playing for the Roller Hawks, he wears the number 9. In 2003, the Wollongong Roller Hawks, competed in the NWBL Championship and won. In the first game of the 2011 season against the Perth Wheelcats, he scored 44 points. His team went on to beat the Perth Wheelcats in the 2011 NWBL Championship. In the finals game, he scored 48 points.

In 2010, Knowles was playing club basketball with Valladolid in Spain. He was the team's season MVP in 2011.

== Recognition ==
In 2002, Knowles was named the New South Wales Wheelchair Basketballer of the Year. In 2004, Knowles and Brendan Dowler received the Illawarra Mercury Sports Star of the Year Award.
