= Brayden Foxley-Connolly =

Australian wheelchair basketball and rugby player

Personal information
- Nationality: Australian
- Born: 24 August 2004 (age 21)

Sport
- Country: Australia
- Sport: Wheelchair rugby / Wheelchair basketball
- Disability class: 3.5 (rugby)
- Club: Bond University Rugby Club
Medal record
Wheelchair rugby
Representing Australia
Paralympic Games
Bronze medal – third place	2024 Paris	Mixed

Brayden Foxley-Connolly (born 24 August 2004) is an Australian wheelchair basketball and rugby player. He won a bronze medal with the Steelers at the 2024 Summer Paralympics.

== Personal ==
Foxley-Connolly is from Mackay, Queensland. In 2006, at 22 months of age, he contracted meningococcal meningitis. This led him losing his right hand, left thumb, one or two joints from each left finger, his left leg at the knee and three toes from the right foot. It also left him with an acquired brain injury.

His mother Amanda has credited the support he has received from the National Disability Insurance Scheme for his sporting endeavours and life. She stated “There was a time where he was borrowing a sporting wheelchair to participate in his wheelchair basketball from another participant, and he was unable to play in some games and was restricted to training days only due to not having his own. But once he received his sporting wheelchair, things just took off for him. When he was young, he often withdrew from social interaction due to feelings of being different to his peers, but now, he's increased his social inclusion through developing friendships and community engagement all over Australia.”

== Wheelchair basketball ==
At the age of ten, he was selected to compete in the discus for the Queensland school side. In 2016, he started playing for Mackay's wheelchair basketball club. He has subsequently represented Queensland in national competitions. He represented Australia at the IWBF U23 World Wheelchair Basketball Championship in Thailand.

Variety Australia, the Children's Charity, provided him a $5,000 sport scholarship each year for five years until the age of eighteen.

== Wheelchair rugby ==
Foxley-Connolly is a 3.5 player and in 2024 is a member of the Bond University Rugby Club that plays in the National Wheelchair Rugby Championships. He was a member of Steelers that won the 2024 WWR Paralympic Qualification Tournament, Wellington, New Zealand and has been selected for the 2024 Summer Paralympics.

At the 2024 Summer Paralympics, he was a member of the Steelers that won the bronze medal defeating Great Britain 50–48.
