= Tom Goodman =

Australian paratriathlete

Personal information
- Full name: Thomas Goodman
- Nationality: Australian
- Born: 24 September 1990 (age 35)
- Relative: Molly Goodman (sister)

Sport
- Sport: Paratriathlon
Medal record
Men's paratriathlon
Representing Australia
Oceania Championships
Gold medal – first place	2024 Stockton	PTS2

Thomas "Tom" Goodman (born 24 September 1990) is an Australian para-triathlete. He competed at the 2024 Paris Paralympics.

== Personal ==
Goodman was born on 24 September 1990. His partner Rachael is expecting their first child a fortnight before he races on 1 September 2024. The couple's wedding is planned for October 2024. His sister is Olympic rower Molly Goodman. With his sister, they will create Australian sporting history as the first Australian siblings to qualify for the Olympics and Paralympic Games.

== Paratriathlon ==
Prior to triathlon, he represented Australia with the Pararoos in 2008. While living in Alice Springs working for the National Disability Insurance Scheme, he tried triathlon and ended up loving it His first national event was in 2015. He is classified as a PTS2 paratriathlete. Goodman won his first-ever World Triathlon Para Series medal with bronze at Yokohma in May 2024 in the Men's PTS2. It was his third World Series competition.

In 2024, he was awarded South Australian Triathlon's The Para/Multiclass Athlete of the Year (Male).

He was ranked ninth in the Men's PTS2 going into the 2024 Paris Paralympics where he finished ninth.

At the 2025 World Triathlon Para Championships in Wollongong, he finished eight in the Men's PTS2.
