= Dianne Barnes =

Australian para-equestrian

Personal information
- Born: 23 April 1958 (age 68)

Sport
- Country: Australia
- Sport: Para-equestrian

Dianne Barnes (née Delaney, born 23 April 1958) is an Australian para-equestrian. She competed at the 2024 Paris Paralympics.

== Personal ==
Barnes was born on 23 April 1958. In 2016, Barnes had spinal surgery on C5-6 and C6-7 anterior decompression and fusion and in 2019 a full left hip replacement. In 2020, she was diagnosed with Parkinson's Disease and dystiona in her neck. She is married to Chris with a daughter Jodie and son Nathan. In 2024, she lives in Red Hill, Victoria.

== Equestrian ==
Barnes started pony riding at the age of four. She left school at the end of year ten to work with horse racing trainers Mark and Jim Houlihan. She went to become A grade show jump rider, three-day eventer and leading female jockey winning forty races in six years. After her 2020 heath diagnosis, her daughter Jodie encouraged her to take up para equestrian dressage where she was originally is classified as grade five but now is grade four due to her left side becoming weaker. At the 2022 World Championship in Herning, Denmark, she rode Cil Dara Cosmic (Stella) and finished 11th in the individual test (67.375%) and 10th in the team test (68.439%). Her horse Stella retired at the end championships. At the 2024 Summer Paralympics, she will ride Sorena.

At the 2024 Summer Paralympics, she finished 12th in Dressage individual team test grade II.

In 2022, she was awarded the Victorian Para Athlete of the Year. In 2024, she is a Victorian Institute of Sport scholarship athlete.
