= Liam Twomey (triathlete) =

Australian paratriathlete (born 1994)

Personal information
- Nationality: Australian
- Born: 21 January 1994 (age 32)

Sport
- Sport: Paratriathlon
Medal record
Men's paratriathlon
Representing Australia
Oceania Championships
Silver medal – second place	2019 Newcastle	PTS4
Silver medal – second place	2020 Newcastle	PTS4
Silver medal – second place	2022 Stockton	PTS4
Silver medal – second place	2024 Stockton	PTS4

Liam Twomey (born 24 January 1994) is an Australian para-triathlete. He competed at the 2024 Paris Paralympics.

== Personal life ==
He was born on 24 January 1994. At the age of seven, he was diagnosed with Ewing sarcoma, a rare form of bone cancer and forced to have his right leg amputated below his knee. This led to depression and drug taking in his late teens. He graduated from Caulfield Grammar School in 2011. In 2024, he is undertaking a Bachelor of Exercise and Sports Science at Deakin University. He works as an ambassador for the Black Dog Institute through a joint community engagement program with the Australian Institute of Sport called the Mental Fitness Program. In 2024, he was appointed Chair AusTriathlon's Athletes’ Commission.

== Paratriathlon ==
Twomey attended a disability expo for prosthetic legs and an Australian Paralympian Don Elgin said 'mate, come and try a triathlon". He took part in his first triathlon in 2018. He is classified as PTS4 paratriathlete. He missed selection for the 2020 Tokyo Paralympics. Twomey is ranked ninth in the Men's PTS4 going into the 2024 Paris Paralympics after strong performances in the qualification period including second at the 2023 World Triathlon Para Cup in Malaga and first at 2024 World Triathlon Para Cup in Tata, Hungary. He finished 13th at the 2024 Summer Paralympics.

In 2024, he is a Victorian Institute of Sport scholarship athlete.
