= Chris Addis =

Australian para table tennis player

Personal information
- Full name: Christoper Addis
- Nationality: Australian
- Born: 8 September 1988 (age 37) Melton, Victoria, Australia

Sport
- Country: Australia
- Sport: Table Tennis
- Club: Melton Table Tennis Club

Christoper "Chris" Addis (born 8 September 1988) is an Australian Paralympic table tennis player. He competed at the 2024 Paris Paralympics.

Addis was born 8 September 1988 with spina bifida. In 2024, he lives Melton, Victoria and has a wife and two children.

== Table tennis ==
Addis tried several sports growing up and focused on table tennis in 2009. He is classified as class 4. He first represented Australia in 2011 in Hong Kong and at the 2014 World Championships. He then took a break from the sport and returned to elite competition in mid 2020.

He won the class 4 men's singles at the 2023 Oceania Para Championships and this qualified him for the 2024 Paris Paralympics.

Addis competed at the 2024 Summer Paralympics in the Men's Singles 4, Men's Doubles 8 and Mixed Doubles 7 but did not progress after the opening matches.

In 2024, he is a Victorian Institute of Sport athlete.
