= Bose Omolayo =

Nigerian powerlifter (born 1989)

Personal information
- Born: 1 February 1989 (age 37) Igbuzo, Nigeria
- Weight: 74 kg (163 lb)

Sport
- Sport: Powerlifting
- Event: +61 kg
Medal record
Women's Powerlifting
Representing Nigeria
Paralympic Games
Gold medal – first place	2016 Rio De Janeiro	79 kg
Gold medal – first place	2020 Tokyo	79 kg
Silver medal – second place	2024 Paris	79 kg
World Championships
Gold medal – first place	2021 Tbilisi	79 kg
Commonwealth Games
Silver medal – second place	2014 Glasgow	+61 kg
Silver medal – second place	2022 Birmingham	Heavyweight
- Updated on 23 January 2023

Bose Omolayo (born 1 February 1989) is a Nigerian powerlifter. She won the gold medal in the women's 79 kg event at the 2020 Summer Paralympics held in Tokyo, Japan. A few months later, she won the gold medal in her event at the 2021 World Para Powerlifting Championships held in Tbilisi, Georgia. At this event, she also set a new world record of 144 kg.

She competed in the women's +61 kg event at the 2014 Commonwealth Games where she won a silver medal. She competed at the games again in 2022 where she won a silver medal in the women's heavyweight event.
