= Folashade Oluwafemiayo =

Nigerian Paralympic athlete (born 1985)

Folashade Alice Oluwafemiayo
Personal information
- Born: 11 March 1985 (age 41) Jos, Plateau State, Nigeria
- Height: 1.80 m (5 ft 11 in)

Sport
- Sport: Powerlifting
Medal record
Representing Nigeria
Women's Powerlifting
Paralympic Games
Gold medal – first place	2020 Tokyo	86 kg
Gold medal – first place	2024 Paris	+86 kg
Silver medal – second place	2012 London	75 kg
World Championships
Gold medal – first place	2017 Mexico City	86 kg
Gold medal – first place	2019 Nur-Sultan	86 kg
Gold medal – first place	2021 Tbilisi	86 kg
Gold medal – first place	2025 Cairo	+86 kg
Commonwealth Games
Gold medal – first place	2022 Birmingham	Heavyweight
Gold medal – first place	2026 Glasgow	Heavyweight

Folashade Alice Oluwafemiayo (born 11 March 1985) is a Nigerian Paralympic powerlifter.

== Personal life ==
Oluwafemiayo was born in Jos, and she is married to another Paralympic athlete, with whom she has a child.

== Career ==
In 2012, Oluwafemiayo won silver medal in the women's 75kg category at the 2012 Summer Paralympics, breaking the world record in the process. She also won gold medal at the 2017 World Para Powerlifting Championships in Mexico. However, she was suspended a year later for breaking anti-doping laws.

In 2021, she won the gold medal in her event at the 2021 World Para Powerlifting Championships held in Tbilisi, Georgia. At this event, she also set a new world record of 152.5 kg. She returned in the +86 kg classification in 2025 in Cairo, to win her fourth overall world title.

She competed at the 2022 Commonwealth Games where she won a gold medal in the heavyweight event, and retained the title four years later at the 2026 Commonwealth Games.
