= Taylor Gosens =

Australian Paralympic judoka

Personal information
- Nationality: Australian
- Born: 4 October 1997 (age 28)
- Occupation: Judoka

Sport
- Country: Australia
- Sport: Judo

Taylor Gosens (born 4 October 1997) is an Australian Paralympic judoka. She competed at the 2024 Paris Paralympics.

== Personal ==
Gosens is the daughter of Gerard and Heather and has a brother Jordan. Her father competed at three Paralympic Games in athletics and goalball. She has four per cent vision as a result of aniridia, a congenital condition which means she was born with no iris, and glaucoma. Gosen grew up with a passion for music that led her to studying sound engineering at St Aidan's Anglican Girls' School and taking up drumming. She left Brisbane to study a Bachelor of Entertainment Management at the Australian Institute of Music in Sydney.

== Judo ==
Gosens tried various sports in her childhood. She originally tried Brazilian jui-jitsu and took up judo as a way to managing stress during her studies in Sydney. She has overcome an anterior cruciate ligament reconstruction . She competed at the 2023 IBSA World Games in the Women's J2 +70 kg division, her major international competition.

At the 2024 Paris Paralympics, Gosen became the second woman to represent Australia in Paralympic judo. She lost her two bouts in the Women's +70 kg J2.

In 2024, she is coached by Ivica Pavlinic, who represented New Zealand in judo at the 2014 Commonwealth Games.
