= Jessy Chen =

Australian para table tennis player

Personal information
- Nationality: Australian
- Born: 5 January 1990 (age 36) Guangdong, China

Sport
- Country: Australia
- Sport: Table Tennis

Junjian "Jessy" Chen (born 5 January 1990) is an Australian Paralympic table tennis player. He competed at the 2024 Paris Paralympics.

== Personal ==
Chen was born on 5 January 1990 in Guangdong, China. During his teenage years, his family moved from Southern China to the Solomon Islands for work. In 2006, his family was attacked and he ended up in intensive care due to severe blood loss and a heart attack as result of a machete attack to his neck. The attack meant that he had to use a wheelchair. His family were evacuated to Australia. He spent his first three months at the Royal Rehabilitation Centre in Sydney, where he learned to move and talk again.

== Table tennis ==
Chen took up table tennis as part of his rehabilitation program and is classified as a C3 Para-table tennis player. He won the men's singles class 2-3 men's singles at the 2017 Para Oceania Championships, the men's singles class 3–5 at the 2019 Para Oceania Championships and 2023 men's singles class 3 at the 2023 Para Oceania Championships. He competed in the men's singles class 3–5 at the 2022 Commonwealth Games, Birmingham.

Chen competed at the 2024 Paris Paralympics in the Men's Singles 3, Men's Doubles 8 and Mixed Doubles 7 but did not progress after the opening matches.

He was awarded a Kurt Fearley scholarship and is supported by the New South Wales Institute of Sport.

Chen has Level 1 coaching certificate and coaches at the Royal Rehabilitation Centre.
