= Holly Warn =

Australian Paralympic swimmer

Personal information
- Nationality: Australian
- Born: 26 March 2009 (age 16)

Sport
- Country: Australia
- Sport: Paralympic swimming
- Disability class: S7
- Club: St Hilda's SC
- Coached by: Alex Beaver

Holly Warn (born 26 March 2009) is an Australian Paralympic swimmer. She was the youngest Australian swimmer at the 2024 Paris Paralympics.

== Personal life ==
Warn was born with cerebral palsy that affects her left side. In 2023, a diagnosis of epilepsy kept her out of the pool. She attended Sacred Heart Catholic Primary School in Mosman, New South Wales and in 2024 attends St Hilda's School on the Gold Coast, Queensland. Her father John played grade level cricket In Sydney and was involved in cricket administration. Her grandfather was Michael Morgan, an Australian Olympic rower who won a silver medal. Warn has 3 siblings, and expresses her gratitude to her family’s support regularly.

== Swimming ==
Warn started swimming to build her strength from the effects of cerebral palsy. She is classified as a S7 swimmer. She dreamed of competing at the Paralympics after watching Maddison Elliott win gold at the 2016 Summer Paralympics. After strong performances at national swimming championships, she was selected as a member of The Para Flippers Development Squad for 2023. She was selected on the Australian Swim Para Team to compete at Para Swimming European Open Championships in Madeira, Portugal in 2024.

At the 2024 Paris Paralympics, she competed in three events - 100 m freestyle S7 (14th), 400 m freestyle S7 (7th), 4x50 m freestyle 20 points (team disqualified).

She is coached at St Hilda's by Alex Beaver.
