= Hani Watson =

Australian Paralympic powerlifter (born 1982)

Personal information
- Born: 20 September 1982 (age 44) Auckland, New Zealand

Sport
- Sport: Para powerlifting
Medal record
Representing Australia
Commonwealth Games
Bronze medal – third place	2022 Birmingham	Heavyweight
Bronze medal – third place	2026 Glasgow	Heavyweight

Hani Watson (born 20 September 1982) is an Australian para powerlifter. She was the first Australian to qualify in Para-Powerlifting in 12 years with 2024 Paris Paralympics as her debut. Watson is also a two-time Commonwealth Games bronze medalist.

== Personal ==
Watson, who has lived in Queensland since she was a baby, was born on 20 September 1982 in Auckland, New Zealand. She was born with bilateral leg metaphyseal dysplasia, which bowed her tibia and femur bones. From the age of 9, she underwent multiple surgeries until she was 34, when her last attempt at correcting her legs failed, as it is known now that she suffers a genetic predisposition meaning that her bones will continue to always grow bowed. Watson now suffers from multiple medical issues such as bone effusion, loss of sensation, muscle atrophy, chronic pain and osteonecrosis. Watson uses a wheelchair but can also walk at times with great difficulty or with the aid of crutches. Her disability is progressive and degenerative.

Her name Hani, (pronounced ‘Har-Nee’) has a special meaning to her Niuean Polynesian background – it means “being one with the water.” Hani currently resides in Queensland.

== Powerlifting ==
Watson spent a great deal of time in the gym as her father was a bodybuilder. In 2021, Watson took up para-powerlifting competitively. At the 2021 World Para-Powerlifting Championships in Georgia, she finished eighth and broke the Oceania record with a press of 120 kg in the +86 kilogram.

Watson has been on a steady increase since her international debut at the Georgia Tbilisi World Championships in 2021 by also securing Bronze at the Asia Oceania Championships in South Korea in 2022.

Weeks after securing Bronze at the Asia Oceania Championships, she won a bronze medal breaking Australia’s 16 year drought in the heavyweight event at the Birmingham 2022 Commonwealth Games.

After a successful three year pathway to the Paris Paralympics, she was ranked eighth in the Women's 86 kg + with a best lift of 137 kg. At the 2024 Paris Paralympics, she finished sixth in the Women's 86 kg + with a lift of 133 kg.

Watson won the bronze medal in the heavyweight powerlifting competition at the 2026 Commonwealth Games.
