= Joyce Wambui Njuguna =

Kenyan powerlifter

Joyce Wambūi Njūgūna
Personal information
- Born: 17 April 1976 (age 50) Kiambu, Kenya
- Height: 1.35 m (4 ft 5 in)
- Weight: 51 kg (112 lb)

Sport
- Sport: Powerlifting
Medal record
Representing Kenya
Women's Powerlifting
Commonwealth Games
Bronze medal – third place	2014 Glasgow	Women's +61 kg
- Updated on 11 October 2014

Joyce Wambūi Njūgūna (born 17 April 1976) is a Kenyan powerlifter. She competed in the women's +61 kg event at the 2014 Commonwealth Games where she won a bronze medal. She also competed at the Commonwealth Games in 2018, where she came 3rd in the women's heavyweight but did not receive a medal as there were four overall competitors, and in 2022 where she came 5th in the women's heavyweight event.
