= Louise Sugden =

British Paralympic powerlifter

Personal information
- Full name: Louise Sugden
- Born: 20 July 1984 (age 42) Newbury, England

Sport
- Country: Great Britain; England
- Sport: Wheelchair Basketball and Powerlifting

Achievements and titles
- Paralympic finals: 2008; 2012; 2020
Medal record
Women's wheelchair basketball
Representing Great Britain
Paralympic World Cup
Gold medal – first place	2011 Manchester	Team
Women's powerlifting
Representing Great Britain
Paralympic Games
Bronze medal – third place	2020 Tokyo	86 kg
Representing England
Commonwealth Games
Silver medal – second place	2018 Gold Coast	Heavyweight

Louise Sugden (born 20 July 1984) is a British powerlifter and former international wheelchair basketball player.

== Wheelchair Basketball ==
Sugden was born in Newbury. She started playing wheelchair basketball at age 13.

She competed in 6 European championships, winning bronze in five of them. She brought home a gold from the 2011 Paralympic World Cup. She competed in the Beijing and London Paralympic Games. She retired from international competition in 2016, then from the sport as a whole in 2017.

== Powerlifting ==
In 2017 she started Para powerlifting. Nine months after starting in the sport, she won a silver medal at the 2018 Commonwealth Games. She was due to compete at the 2022 Commonwealth Games but withdrew due to a shoulder injury. She came fourth in the 2026 Commonwealth Games in Glasgow, equalling her personal best of 133 kg.

At the 2020 Paralympic Games, Sugden won powerlifting bronze in the women's 86 kg category, securing the medal with her final lift. The Newbury lifter successfully made 131 kg in the last round to claim the bronze.

Sugden was a guest on The Last Leg of Tokyo 2020 a few hours after landing in London.
