= Ghana at the 2026 Commonwealth Games =

- Flag of Ghana
- CG code: GHA
- CGA: Ghana Olympic Committee
- Website: ghanaolympic.org

in Glasgow, Scotland 23 July 2026 – 2 August 2026
- Competitors: 40 in 6 sports
- Flag bearer: Frema Agyei
- Baton bearer: Tahiru Haruna
- Medals Ranked 30th: Gold 0 Silver 1 Bronze 1 Total 2

Commonwealth Games appearances (overview)
- 1954; 1958; 1962; 1966; 1970; 1974; 1978; 1982; 1986; 1990; 1994; 1998; 2002; 2006; 2010; 2014; 2018; 2022; 2026; 2030

Ghana competed at the 2026 Commonwealth Games in Glasgow, Scotland. This marked Ghana's 18th participation at the games, after making its debut at the 1954 Commonwealth Games.

The Ghanaian team consisted of 40 athletes competing in six sports. The delegation also consisted of five para sport athletes.

The Ghana Olympic Committee announced its team of forty athletes on 13 July 2026. Judoka Frema Agyei was the country's opening ceremony flagbearer. Meanwhile, para powerlifter Tahiru Haruna was the baton bearer during the opening ceremony.

== Competitors ==
The following is the list of number of competitors participating at the Games per sport/discipline.

| Sport | | Men | Women | Total |
|---|---|---|---|---|
| Athletics | Athletics | 5 | 8 | 13 |
| Athletics | Para-athletics | 2 | 1 | 3 |
| Boxing | | 7 | 3 | 10 |
| Judo | | 0 | 2 | 2 |
| Swimming | Swimming | 2 | 2 | 4 |
| Swimming | Para-swimming | 1 | 0 | 1 |
| Track cycling | | 2 | 0 | 2 |
| Weightlifting | Para powerlifting | 1 | 0 | 1 |
| Weightlifting | Weightlifting | 3 | 1 | 4 |
| Total | | 23 | 17 | 40 |

== Medallists ==
The following Ghanaian competitors won medals at the games. In the by discipline sections below, medallists' names are bolded.

| Medal | Name | Sport | Event | Date | Ref. |
|---|---|---|---|---|---|
| Silver | Zinabu Issah | Athletics | Women's shot put F57 | 27 July | |
| Bronze | Amadu Mohammed | Boxing | Men's 55 kg | 31 July | |

== Athletics ==
Team Ghana announced its first athletes for the 2026 Games, naming three para athletes. On 13 July 2026, the remaining members of the Athletics team were announced.

Key

Ranks given for track events are within the athlete's heat only.

- **Q** = Qualified for the next round
- **q** = Qualified for the next round as a fastest loser or, in field events, by position without achieving the qualifying target

Men
Track

| Athlete | Event | Heat | | Semifinal | | Final | |
| Athlete | Event | Result | Rank | Result | Rank | Result | Rank |
|---|---|---|---|---|---|---|---|
| Benjamin Azamati | 100 metres | 10.00 | 1 **q** | 10.00 | 3 **q** | 10.11 | 7 |
| Isaac Botsio | 100 metres | 10.40 | 4 | Did not advance | | | |
| Abdul-Rasheed Saminu | 100 metres | 10.01 | 1 **q** | 10.06 | 3 | Did not advance | |
| Joseph Paul Amoah | 200 metres | 20.36 | 1 **q** | 20.24 **SB** | 1 **Q** | 20.47 | 7 |
| Mustapha Bokpin | 200 metres | — | | 20.65 | 7 | Did not advance | |
| James Dadzie | 200 metres | 20.65 | 1 **q** | 20.52 | 4 | Did not advance | |
| Baba Seidu | 400 metres hurdles | 51.48 | 6 | Did not advance | | | |
| Joseph Paul Amoah; Benjamin Azamati; Mustapha Bokpin; Abdul-Rasheed Saminu | 4 x 100 metres relay | 38.40 | 2 **Q** | — | | 38.13 | 4 |

Women
Track

| Athlete | Event | Heat | | Semifinal | | Final | |
| Athlete | Event | Result | Rank | Result | Rank | Result | Rank |
|---|---|---|---|---|---|---|---|
| Deborah Acheampong | 100 metres | 11.66 | 3 | Did not advance | | | |
| Anita Afrifa | 200 metres | DNF | | Did not advance | | | |
| Abigail Abugire | 800 metres | 2:06.31 | 5 | Did not advance | | | |
| Evonne Britton | 100 metres hurdles | 12.78 | 4 **q** | — | | 13.04 | 7 |
| Lovina Ewusi | 400 metres hurdles | 57.54 | 5 | — | | Did not advance | |
| Deborah Acheampong; Anita Afrifa; Evonne Britton; Lovina Ewusi | 4 x 100 metres relay | 50.75 | 6 | — | | Did not advance | |

Field

| Athlete | Event | Final | |
| Athlete | Event | Result | Rank |
|---|---|---|---|
| Rose Yeboah | High jump | 1.82 | 6 |

=== Para athletics ===
| Athlete | Event | Final | |
| Athlete | Event | Result | Rank |
|---|---|---|---|
| Hayford Addai | Men's 100 metres (T47) | 10.99 **PB** | 5 |
| Raphael Botsyo Nkegbe | Men's 1500 metres (T54) | 3:48.41 **SB** | 8 |
| **Zinabu Issah** | Women's shot put (F57) | 8.65 **SB** | 2nd place, silver medalist(s) |

== Boxing ==
Ghana entered a team of ten boxers, seven men and three women.

Men

| Athlete | Event | Round of 32 | Round of 16 | Quarterfinals | Semifinals | Final | |
| Athlete | Event | Opposition Result | Opposition Result | Opposition Result | Opposition Result | Opposition Result | Rank |
|---|---|---|---|---|---|---|---|
| **Amadu Mohammed** | 55 kg | Bye | Temakau (KIR); **W** RSC | Trowbridge (ENG); **W** 4–1 | Dixon (AUS); **L** 1–4 | Did not advance | 3rd place, bronze medalist(s) |
| Ebenezer Ankrah | 60 kg | Bye | Devlin (SCO); **L** 2–3 | Did not advance | | | |
| Abdul Wahid Omar | 65 kg | Mughalzai (ENG); **L** 0–5 | Did not advance | | | | |
| Precious Akai Nettey | 70 kg | Bye | Qiokata (FIJ); **W** RSC | Clair (MRI); **L** 0–5 | Did not advance | | |
| Desmond Pappoe | 80 kg | Bye | Tonga (TGA); **W** 3–2 | Ofori (CAN); **L** WO | Did not advance | | |
| Jibril Muntari | 90 kg | —N/a | Bye | McAllister (NIR); **L** 0–5 | Did not advance | | |
| Daniel Plange | +90 kg | —N/a | | McCartan (NIR); **L** 0–5 | Did not advance | | |

Women

| Athlete | Event | Round of 32 | Round of 16 | Quarterfinals | Semifinals | Final | |
| Athlete | Event | Opposition Result | Opposition Result | Opposition Result | Opposition Result | Opposition Result | Rank |
|---|---|---|---|---|---|---|---|
| Ramatu Quaye | 51 kg | —N/a | Wall (CAN); **L** 0–5 | Did not advance | | | |
| Nancy Banfo | 54 kg | Bye | Clyde (NIR); **L** 0–5 | Did not advance | | | |
| Adelaide Djabatey | 57 kg | —N/a | Daunakamakama (FIJ); **L** 0–5 | Did not advance | | | |

== Judo ==
Ghana entered two female judoka.

| Athlete | Event | Round of 16 | Quarterfinals | Semifinals | Repechage | Final/BM | |
| Athlete | Event | Opposition Result | Opposition Result | Opposition Result | Opposition Result | Opposition Result | Rank |
|---|---|---|---|---|---|---|---|
| Frema Agyei | Women's 57 kg | Sesay (SLE); **W** 100–000 | Mourya (IND); **L** 000–100 | Did not advance | Nawila (ZAM); **W** 100–001 | Neirne (ENG); **L** 000–100 | 5 |
| Elizabeth Oduro | Women's 63 kg | Knoester (RSA); **L** 000–100 | Did not advance | | | | |

== Swimming ==
Ghana entered four swimmers, two men and two women.

| Athlete | Event | Heat | | Semifinal | | Final | |
| Athlete | Event | Time | Rank | Time | Rank | Time | Rank |
|---|---|---|---|---|---|---|---|
| Ivan Snowden | Men's 50 m freestyle | 24.66 | 48 | Did not advance | | | |
| Ivan Snowden | Men's 50 m breaststroke | 31.63 | 49 | Did not advance | | | |
| Abeku Jackson | Men's 50 m backstroke | 26.48 | 18 | Did not advance | | | |
| Abeku Jackson | Men's 50 m butterfly | 24.11 | 14 **Q** | 24.03 | 15 | Did not advance | |
| Unilez Takyi | Women's 50 m freestyle | 27.13 | 32 | Did not advance | | | |
| Unilez Takyi | Women's 100 m freestyle | 1:00.94 | 43 | Did not advance | | | |
| Nubia Adjei | Women's 50 m backstroke | 30.91 | 24 | Did not advance | | | |
| Nubia Adjei | Women's 50 m butterfly | 30.02 | 41 | Did not advance | | | |
| Abeku Jackson; Ivan Snowden; Nubia Adjei; Unilez Takyi | Mixed 4 × 100 m freestyle relay | 3:53.60 | 15 | —N/a | | Did not advance | |
| Abeku Jackson; Ivan Snowden; Nubia Adjei; Unilez Takyi | Mixed 4 × 100 m medley relay | 4:16.85 | 15 | —N/a | | Did not advance | |

=== Para swimming ===
Ghana entered one male para swimmer.

| Athlete | Event | Heat | | Final | |
| Athlete | Event | Time | Rank | Time | Rank |
|---|---|---|---|---|---|
| Promise Aheto | Men's 100 m breaststroke SB9 | 1:41.59 | 10 | Did not advance | |

== Track cycling ==
Ghana selected two endurance cyclists, one of each sex, for the 2026 Games.

- Erica Sedzro - women's endurance
- Emmanuel Sackey - men's endurance

== Weightlifting ==
Ghana qualified one male weightlifter. Three further quotas were awarded via reallocation and the bipartite process.

| Athlete | Event | Snatch (kg) | | Clean & Jerk (kg) | | Total (kg) | Rank |
| Athlete | Event | Result | Rank | Result | Rank | Total (kg) | Rank |
|---|---|---|---|---|---|---|---|
| Emmanuel Boeteng | Men's 71 kg | 127 | 7 | 155 | 7 | 282 | 7 |
| Forrester Osei | Men's 94 kg | 148 | 5 | 180 | 4 | 328 | 5 |
| Abdul Salim | Men's 110 kg | 133 | 8 | 165 | 6 | 298 | 6 |
| Yayra Agozi | Women's 58 kg | Did not compete | | | | | |

=== Para powerlifting ===
Ghana qualified one male para powerlifter.

| Athlete | Event | Lift (kg) | Points | Rank |
|---|---|---|---|---|
| Tahiru Haruna | Men's heavyweight | 212 | 112 | 7 |
