= Athletics at the 2026 Commonwealth Games =

Event at the 2026 Commonwealth Games

- Pictogram for athletics & para-athletics
- Venue: Scotstoun Stadium, Glasgow
- Dates: 27 July−1 August 2026
- Competitors: 923+2 guides from 71 nations

Athletics was one of the sports held at the 2026 Commonwealth Games in Glasgow, Scotland. As a founding sport, athletics had appeared consistently since its introduction at the 1911 Inter-Empire Games, the recognized precursor to the Commonwealth Games.

Out-of-stadium events were dropped for this edition, but the Games saw the reintroduction of the mile race, branded as the Commonwealth Mile for both sexes, to link to the strong tradition of mile running and races in the Commonwealth and previous Commonwealth Games, as well as the introduction of a mixed 4 x 400 metres relay.

A record programme of 16 para-athletics events was included in the Games.

== Schedule ==
The competition schedule was as follows:

Qualifying / Heats	½	Semi-finals	F	Final

Men
Date Event	Mon 27		Tue 28			Wed 29		Thu 30		Fri 31		Sat 1	
Session →	M	E	M	E		M	E	M	E	M	E	M	E
100 m	Q			½	F								
100 m (T11/12)						Q			F				
100 m (T37/38)		F											
100 m (T45/47)							F						
200 m						Q			½		F		
400 m			Q					½				F	
800 m			Q						½				F
1500 m (T20)		F											
1500 m (T53/54)												F	
Mile						Q							F
5000 m													F
10,000 m				F									
110 m hurdles	Q	F											
400 m hurdles	Q						½				F		
3000 m steeplechase		F											
4 × 100 m relay												Q	F
10,000 m walk											F		
High jump		F											
Pole vault								Q					F
Long jump	Q						F						
Long Jump (T20)				F									
Triple jump								Q				F	
Shot put						Q			F				
Shot Put (F55-57)												F	
Discus throw										Q		F	
Discus throw (F42-44)							F						
Hammer throw		F											
Javelin throw								Q			F		
Decathlon								F					

Women
Date Event	Mon 27		Tue 28			Wed 29		Thu 30		Fri 31		Sat 1	
Session →	M	E	M	E		M	E	M	E	M	E	M	E
100 m	Q			½	F								
100 m (T37/38)	Q	F											
100 m (T45-47)									F				
200 m						Q			½		F		
200 m (T37/38)										Q		F	
400 m			Q					½				F	
400 m (T53/54)										Q			F
800 m		Q					½				F		
1500 m (T53/54)							F						
Mile								Q					F
5000 m									F				
10,000 m		F											
100 m hurdles								Q	F				
400 m hurdles						Q					F		
3000 m steeplechase							F						
4 × 100 m relay												Q	F
10,000 m walk												F	
High jump	Q			F									
Pole vault											F		
Long jump										Q		F	
Long jump (T37/38)											F		
Triple jump						Q			F				
Shot put			Q				F						
Shot put (F55/57)		F											
Discus throw			Q						F				
Discus throw (F42/44)							F						
Hammer throw	Q			F									
Javelin throw												F	
Heptathlon			F										

Mixed
Date Event	Fri 31		Sat 1	
Session →	M	E	M	E
4 x 400 m relay	Q			F

== Venue ==
Track and field events were held exclusively at the Scotstoun Stadium in Glasgow. There were no out of stadium events in this edition of the Games.

== Medal summary ==
=== Medal table ===
* Host nation (Scotland)

Rank	CGA	Gold	Silver	Bronze	Total
1	Australia	12	11	11	34
2	Jamaica	10	3	5	18
3	England	6	9	6	21
4	Canada	4	7	5	16
5	Nigeria	4	3	6	13
6	Scotland*	4	0	3	7
7	India	3	7	6	16
8	Kenya	3	4	4	11
9	New Zealand	2	3	2	7
10	Wales	2	2	1	5
11	South Africa	1	2	1	4
12	Sri Lanka	1	1	0	2
13	Cameroon	1	0	1	2
13	Malaysia	1	0	1	2
15	Bahamas	1	0	0	1
15	British Virgin Islands	1	0	0	1
15	Dominica	1	0	0	1
15	Grenada	1	0	0	1
15	Northern Ireland	1	0	0	1
20	Trinidad and Tobago	0	2	2	4
21	Mauritius	0	2	0	2
22	Cyprus	0	1	1	2
23	Barbados	0	1	0	1
23	Ghana	0	1	0	1
25	Bermuda	0	0	1	1
25	Isle of Man	0	0	1	1
25	Rwanda	0	0	1	1
25	Uganda	0	0	1	1
Totals (28 entries)		59	59	59	177

=== Men ===
Event	Gold		Silver		Bronze	
100 metres	Emmanuel Eseme; Cameroon	9.83 GR, NR	Lachlan Kennedy; Australia	9.85 AR	Kayinsola Ajayi; Nigeria	9.90
200 metres	Sinesipho Dambile; South Africa	19.96	Udodi Onwuzurike; Nigeria	20.09 SB	Christopher Taylor; Jamaica	20.11 PB
400 metres	Samuel Ogazi; Nigeria	44.25	Jereem Richards; Trinidad and Tobago	44.82	Zakithi Nene; South Africa	45.21
800 metres	Navasky Anderson; Jamaica	1:45.33	Luke Boyes; Australia	1:45.93	Wyclife Kinyamal; Kenya	1:46.12
Mile	Josh Kerr; Scotland	3:54.12	Cameron Myers; Australia	3:55.26	Timothy Cheruiyot; Kenya	3:55.41
5000 metres	Mathew Kipsang; Kenya	13:23.61	Ky Robinson; Australia	13:24.70	Gulveer Singh; India	13:24.95
10,000 metres	Ky Robinson; Australia	27:48.93	Gulveer Singh; India	27:49.78	David Mullarkey; Isle of Man	27:50.28
110 metres hurdles	Demario Prince; Jamaica	13.17	Samuel Bennett; England	13.30 PB	Milan Trajkovic; Cyprus	13.32 SB
400 metres hurdles	Ezekiel Nathaniel; Nigeria	48.47	Jake Minshull; England	48.99	Assinie Wilson; Jamaica	49.22
3000 metres steeplechase	Edmund Serem; Kenya	8:18.23	Simon Kiprop Koech; Kenya	8:18.59	Leonard Kipkemoi Bett; Kenya	8:21.63
4 × 100 metres relay	Australia; Lachlan Kennedy; Joshua Azzopardi; Calab Law; Rohan Browning; Christopher Ius*	38.07	Canada; Aaron Brown; Jerome Blake; Brendon Rodney; Andre De Grasse; Duan Asemota*	38.11	Nigeria; Favour Ashe; Kayinsola Ajayi; Adekalu Fakorede; Udodi Onwuzurike; Chidera Ezeakor*	38.12 SB
10,000 metres walk	Isaac Beacroft; Australia	38:45.51 SB	Stephen Ndangiri Kihu; Kenya	38:46.57 PB	Evan Dunfee; Canada	40:03.39
High jump	Romaine Beckford; Jamaica	2.25 m	Sarvesh Kushare; India	2.25 m	Kimani Jack; England	2.20 m
Pole vault	Kurtis Marschall; Australia	5.85 m GR	Kyle Rademeyer; South Africa	5.70 m	Owen Heard; England	5.70 m
Long jump	Tajay Gayle; Jamaica	8.15 m	Murali Sreeshankar; India	8.09 m	Stephen Mackenzie; Scotland	8.08 m
Triple jump	Jordan Scott; Jamaica	16.72 m	Praveen Chithravel; India	16.58 m	Selva Prabhu; India	16.52 m
Shot put	Chukwuebuka Enekwechi; Nigeria	21.07 m	Tom Walsh; New Zealand	21.03 m	Scott Lincoln; England	20.99 m
Discus throw	Matthew Denny; Australia	67.73 m	Fedrick Dacres; Jamaica	65.10 m	Lawrence Okoye; England	64.45 m
Hammer throw	Ethan Katzberg; Canada	80.97 m GR	Iosif Kesidis; Cyprus	76.97 m	Rowan Hamilton; Canada	75.36 m
Javelin throw	Rumesh Tharanga; Sri Lanka	89.75 m	Neeraj Chopra; India	85.83 m	Yashvir Singh; India	85.41 m
Decathlon	Lindon Victor; Grenada	8096 pts SB	Damian Warner; Canada	8036 pts	Tejaswin Shankar; India	7976 pts

=== Women ===
Event	Gold		Silver		Bronze	
100 metres	Zoe Hobbs; New Zealand	10.93 AR	Amy Hunt; England	10.98	Torrie Lewis; Australia	10.99 NR
200 metres	Adaejah Hodge; British Virgin Islands	22.07	Shaniqua Bascombe; Trinidad and Tobago	22.35	Alana Reid; Jamaica	22.56
400 metres	Dejanea Oakley; Jamaica	50.21	Sada Williams; Barbados	50.99	Ella Onojuvwevwo; Nigeria	51.00
800 metres	Georgia Hunter Bell; England	1:59.51	Lilian Odira; Kenya	2:00.58	Sarah Billings; Australia	2:00.61
Mile	Abbey Caldwell; Australia	4:39.31	Jessica Hull; Australia	4:39.86	Claudia Hollingsworth; Australia	4:40.20
5000 metres	Rose Davies; Australia	14:44.53 SB	Jessica Hull; Australia	14:45.01 SB	Megan Keith; Scotland	14:49.10 SB
10,000 metres	Rose Davies; Australia	31:39.32 SB	Diana Wanza; Kenya	31:50.13	Florence Niyonkuru; Rwanda	31:55.47
100 metres hurdles	Devynne Charlton; Bahamas	12.33	Megan Simmonds; Jamaica	12.41	Tobi Amusan; Nigeria	12.60
400 metres hurdles	Sanique Walker; Jamaica	54.00 PB	Emily Newnham; England	54.04	Savannah Sutherland; Canada	54.16 SB
3000 metres steeplechase	Faith Cherotich; Kenya	9:01.76 GR	Elise Thorner; England	9:05.45 PB	Peruth Chemutai; Uganda	9:09.96
4 × 100 metres relay	Jamaica; Alana Reid; Jodean Williams; Lavanya Williams; Ashanti Moore	42.65	Canada; Sade McCreath; Marie-Éloïse Leclair; Frédérique Chiasson; Audrey Leduc	42.76	Trinidad and Tobago; Michelle-Lee Ahye; Shaniqua Bascombe; Leah Bertrand; Reese Webster	43.07 SB
10,000 metres walk	Jemima Montag; Australia	42:13.40 PB	Elizabeth McMillen; Australia	42:39.87 SB	Rebecca Henderson; Australia	43:27.46
High jump	Eleanor Patterson; Australia	1.96 m =GR	Nicola Olyslagers; Australia	1.93 m	Temitope Adeshina; Nigeria	1.90 m
Pole vault	Eliza McCartney; New Zealand	4.65 m	Nina Kennedy; Australia	4.65 m	Imogen Ayris; New Zealand	4.55 m
Long jump	Jazmin Sawyers; England	6.93 m	Ruth Usoro; Nigeria	6.87 m	Brooke Buschkuehl; Australia	6.80 m
Triple jump	Thea LaFond; Dominica	14.60 m	Ackelia Smith; Jamaica	14.04 m	Shantae Foreman; Jamaica	13.96 m
Shot put	Sarah Mitton; Canada	19.88 m	Jessica Oji; Nigeria	17.87 m	Lloydricia Cameron; Jamaica	17.87 m
Discus throw	Samantha Hall; Jamaica	61.66 m	Julia Tunks; Canada	60.67 m	Seema Kaliramna; India	58.65 m
Hammer throw	Camryn Rogers; Canada	74.91 m GR	Lauren Bruce; New Zealand	69.82 m	Lara Roberts; Australia	68.05 m
Javelin throw	Mackenzie Little; Australia	61.88 m SB	Tori Moorby; New Zealand	60.04 m	Irene Jepkemboi; Kenya	57.85 m
Heptathlon	Kate O'Connor; Northern Ireland	6569 pts	Jade O'Dowda; England	6278 pts	Tori West; Australia	6104 pts

=== Mixed ===
Event	Gold		Silver		Bronze	
4 × 400 metres relay	Jamaica; Zandrion Barnes; Leah Anderson; Delano Kennedy; Dejanea Oakley; Shana Kaye Anderson*; Christopher Taylor*	3:10.97	England; Ben Jeffries; Yemi Mary John; Toby Harries; Lina Nielsen; Poppy Malik*; Laviai Nielsen*	3:11.58	Nigeria; Ezekiel Nathaniel; Patience Okon George; Samuel Ogazi; Ella Onojuvwevwo; Udo Edidiong*; Esther Joseph*	3:12.85 SB

=== Para-athletics ===
Men

Event	Gold		Silver		Bronze	
100 metres (T12)	Zachary Shaw; England	10.89	Masala Makatu; South Africa	11.04	George Quarcoo; Canada	11.06
100 metres (T38)	Thomas Young; England	11.11 GR, SB	Ullrich Muller; Australia	11.19 SB	Zachary Gingras; Canada	11.55 PB
100 metres (T47)	Dilip Gavit; India	10.71 GR, SB	Mohammed Basil; India	10.83 SB	Kevin Santos; England	10.85 SB
1500 metres (T20)	Ben Sandilands; Scotland	3:57.25 SB	Michael Barber; Canada	4:01.84	Steven Bryce; Scotland	4:02.40 SB
1500 metres (T54)	Nathan Maguire; England	3:17.65 SB	Daniel Sidbury; England	3:18.31 SB	Sam Rizzo; Australia	3:18.61 SB
Long jump (T20)	Abdul Latif Romly; Malaysia	7.17 m SB	Noah Vucsics; Canada	6.66 m SB	Eljoe Gotuoh; Malaysia	6.51 m SB
Shot put (F57)	Soman Rana; India	13.40 m SB	Shubham Juyal; India	13.28 m SB	Cedric Lekezo Azamdzi; Cameroon	12.57 m SB
Discus throw (F44)	Aled Davies; Wales	48.38 m	Palitha Halgahawela; Sri Lanka	46.84 m PB	Akeem Stewart; Trinidad and Tobago	56.82 m SB

Women

Event	Gold		Silver		Bronze	
100 metres (T38)	Sophie Hahn; England	12.79	Olivia Breen; Wales	12.86 SB	Maddie Down; England	12.86 PB
100 metres (T47)	Sheriauna Haase; Canada	12.23 PB	Chloe Dunbar; Canada	12.33 PB	Anna Grimaldi; New Zealand	12.46 SB
200 metres (T38)	Rhiannon Clarke; Australia	26.92 SB	Sophie Hahn; England	27.53	Briseis Brittain; Australia	27.66
400 metres (T54)	Melanie Woods; Scotland	56.43 SB	Noemi Alphonse; Mauritius	57.89 SB	Jessica Cooper Lewis; Bermuda	59.31
1500 metres (T54)	Melanie Woods; Scotland	3:32.20 GR, SB	Noemi Alphonse; Mauritius	3:32.98 SB	Eliza Ault-Connell; Australia	3:40.84 SB
Long jump (T38)	Olivia Breen; Wales	5.09 m	Layla Sharp; Australia	5.06 m GR, AR	Ayla Kowalczyk; Australia	4.71 m
Shot put (F57)	Sharmila Dhankar; India	9.81 SB	Zinabu Issah; Ghana	8.65 SB	Shilpa Shyla; India	7.26 PB
Discus throw (F44)	Goodness Nwachukwu; Nigeria	39.66 WR	Funmi Oduwaiye; Wales	38.52 SB	Bree Cronin; Wales	36.00 SB

== Participating nations ==
There were 71 participating Commonwealth Games Associations (CGAs) in athletics and para-athletics with a total of 923 athletes (518 men and 405 women). The number of athletes a nation entered is in parentheses beside the name of the country. Two guides competing in the men's T12 event are not included in the numbers below. A total of three CGAs did not compete in the sport of athletics: Cayman Islands, Falkland Islands and Norfolk Island.

- Anguilla (6)
- Antigua and Barbuda (5)
- Australia (86)
- Bahamas (10)
- Bangladesh (5)
- Barbados (10)
- Bermuda (7)
- Belize (3)
- Botswana (12)
- Brunei (2)
- British Virgin Islands (12)
- Canada (63)
- Cameroon (10)
- Cook Islands (4)
- Cyprus (13)
- Dominica (2)
- England (81)
- Eswatini (4)
- Fiji (7)
- Gabon (4)
- The Gambia (7)
- Ghana (16)
- Gibraltar (5)
- Grenada (7)
- Guernsey (2)
- Guyana (9)
- India (43)
- Isle of Man (5)
- Jamaica (45)
- Jersey (5)
- Kenya (56)
- Kiribati (2)
- Saint Lucia (3)
- Lesotho (8)
- Malaysia (4)
- Malawi (3)
- Maldives (8)
- Malta (6)
- Mauritius (17)
- Mozambique (2)
- Montserrat (7)
- Namibia (5)
- Nauru (3)
- New Zealand (19)
- Nigeria (33)
- Northern Ireland (6)
- Niue (1)
- Pakistan (8)
- Papua New Guinea (17)
- Rwanda (6)
- Samoa (3)
- Scotland (38)
- Seychelles (4)
- Singapore (15)
- Saint Helena (4)
- Saint Lucia (3)
- Saint Kitts and Nevis (2)
- Saint Vincent and the Grenadines (5)
- Sierra Leone (8)
- Solomon Islands (3)
- South Africa (31)
- Sri Lanka (22)
- Tanzania (6)
- Tonga (2)
- Togo (5)
- Trinidad and Tobago (14)
- Turks and Caicos Islands (7)
- Tuvalu (5)
- Uganda (17)
- Vanuatu (4)
- Wales (18)
- Zambia (6)
