= India at the 2026 Commonwealth Games =

- Flag of India
- CG code: IND
- CGA: Indian Olympic Association
- Website: olympic.ind.in

in Glasgow, Scotland 23 July 2026 – 2 August 2026
- Competitors: 122 in 10 sports
- Flag bearer (opening): Mirabai Chanu
- Baton bearer: Lovlina Borgohain
- Flag bearer (closing): Jaismine Lamboria
- Medals Ranked 4th: Gold 13 Silver 17 Bronze 9 Total 39

Commonwealth Games appearances (overview)
- 1934; 1938; 1950; 1954; 1958; 1962; 1966; 1970; 1974; 1978; 1982; 1986; 1990; 1994; 1998; 2002; 2006; 2010; 2014; 2018; 2022; 2026; 2030

India competed at the 2026 Commonwealth Games, held in Glasgow, Scotland, from 23 July to 2 August 2026. It was the country's 19th appearance at the Commonwealth Games, after making its debut at the 1934 Commonwealth Games. The Indian contingent consisted of 122 athletes who competed in ten sports.

Weightlifter Mirabai Chanu and boxer Lovlina Borgohain served as the flag-bearer and baton-bearer, respectively, during the opening ceremony. Boxer Jaismine Lamboria served as the country's flagbearer during the closing ceremony.

India won 39 medals including 13 gold, 17 silver, and nine bronze medals, and was ranked fourth in the overall medal table. The country won the most medals in boxing, winning ten medals including seven golds, the most by any nation in the sport in a single Commonwealth Games. India had its best ever performance in judo at a single Commonwealth Games, winning three medals (two golds and one bronze), including its first ever gold medal.

Mirabai Chanu won her third gold medal at the Commonwealth Games, and became only the second Indian to win three successive gold medals at the Games. Gulveer Singh was the only multiple medalist at the Games for India, and became the first Indian track and field athlete to win two individual medals at a single Commonwealth Games, after winning a silver and bronze medal in athletics.

== Background ==
The 2026 Commonwealth Games is the 23nd edition of the Commonwealth Games and is being held in Glasgow, Scotland, from 23 July to 2 August 2026. India made its Commonwealth Games debut at the 1934 edition, (Note: Prior to its independence in 1947, India competed as British India in the 1934 and 1938 editions.) and the 2026 Games mark the country's 19th appearance at the Commonwealth Games. Weightlifter Mirabai Chanu and boxer Lovlina Borgohain served as the flag-bearer and baton-bearer, respectively, during the opening ceremony. Boxer Jaismine Lamboria served as the country's closing ceremony flagbearer.

== Medal summary ==
India won 39 medals including 13 gold, 17 silver, and nine bronze medals, and was ranked fourth in the overall medal table. India won the most medals in boxing, winning ten medals including seven golds, the most by any nation in the sport in a single Commonwealth Games. Indian para athletes had their best performance at a single edition, winning seven medals including three gold medals.

Weightlifter Mirabai Chanu won the country's first gold medal at the Games, in the womens' 48 kg category. It was her third gold medal at the Commonwealth Games, and she became only the second Indian female athlete, after wrestler Vinesh Phogat, to win gold medals at three successive Commonwealth Games. India had its best ever performance in judo at a single Commonwealth Games, with three medals, including its first ever gold medals won by Asmita Dey and Harsh Singh.

In athletics, Gulveer Singh became the first Indian track and field athlete to win two individual medals at a single Commonwealth Games, after he won the silver medal in the men's 10,000 metres and the bronze medal in the men's 5000 metres. Tejaswin Shankar won India's first ever Commonwealth Games medal in decathlon, after securing the bronze medal.

Medals by sport
| Sport | Gold | Silver | Bronze | Total |
| Boxing | 7 | 3 | 0 | 10 |
| Athletics | 3 | 7 | 6 | 16 |
| Judo | 2 | 1 | 1 | 4 |
| Weightlifting | 1 | 6 | 1 | 8 |
| Para powerlifting | 0 | 0 | 1 | 1 |
| Total | 13 | 17 | 9 | 39 |

Medals by day
| Day | Date | Gold | Silver | Bronze | Total |
| 1 | 24 July | 0 | 0 | 1 | 1 |
| 2 | 25 July | 0 | 0 | 0 | 0 |
| 3 | 26 July | 1 | 2 | 0 | 3 |
| 4 | 27 July | 1 | 3 | 2 | 6 |
| 5 | 28 July | 0 | 2 | 0 | 2 |
| 6 | 29 July | 1 | 2 | 0 | 3 |
| 7 | 30 July | 0 | 1 | 1 | 2 |
| 8 | 31 July | 2 | 2 | 2 | 6 |
| 9 | 1 August | 8 | 5 | 3 | 16 |
| 10 | 2 August | 0 | 0 | 0 | 0 |
| Total | | 13 | 17 | 9 | 39 |

Medals by gender
| Gender | Gold | Silver | Bronze | Total |
| Female | 8 | 4 | 4 | 16 |
| Male | 5 | 13 | 5 | 23 |
| Total | 13 | 17 | 9 | 39 |

=== Medalists ===
| Medal | Name | Sport | Event | Date |
|---|---|---|---|---|
| (gold) Gold | Mirabai Chanu | Weightlifting | Women's 48 kg | 26 July 2026 |
| (gold) Gold | Sharmila Dhankar | Athletics | Women's shot put F57 | 27 July 2026 |
| (gold) Gold | Dilip Gavit | Athletics | Men's 100 m T47 | 29 July 2026 |
| (gold) Gold | Asmita Dey | Judo | Women's 48 kg | 31 July 2026 |
| (gold) Gold | Harsh Singh | Judo | Men's 60 kg | 31 July 2026 |
| (gold) Gold | Preeti Pawar | Boxing | Women's 54 kg | 1 August 2026 |
| (gold) Gold | Jaismine Lamboria | Boxing | Women's 57 kg | 1 August 2026 |
| (gold) Gold | Soman Rana | Athletics | Men's shot put F57 | 1 August 2026 |
| (gold) Gold | Sakshi Chaudhary | Boxing | Women's 51 kg | 1 August 2026 |
| (gold) Gold | Priya Ghanghas | Boxing | Women's 60 kg | 1 August 2026 |
| (gold) Gold | Arundhati Choudhary | Boxing | Women's 70 kg | 1 August 2026 |
| (gold) Gold | Sachin Siwach | Boxing | Men's 60 kg | 1 August 2026 |
| (gold) Gold | Ankush Panghal | Boxing | Men's 80 kg | 1 August 2026 |
| (silver) Silver | Rishikanta Singh Chanambam | Weightlifting | Men's 60 kg | 26 July 2026 |
| (silver) Silver | Muthupandi Raja | Weightlifting | Men's 65 kg | 26 July 2026 |
| (silver) Silver | Gyaneshwari Yadav | Weightlifting | Women's 53 kg | 27 July 2026 |
| (silver) Silver | Sarvesh Kushare | Athletics | Men's high jump | 27 July 2026 |
| (silver) Silver | Ajaya Babu Valluri | Weightlifting | Men's 79 kg | 27 July 2026 |
| (silver) Silver | Harjinder Kaur | Weightlifting | Women's 69 kg | 28 July 2026 |
| (silver) Silver | Gulveer Singh | Athletics | Men's 10,000 metres | 28 July 2026 |
| (silver) Silver | Murali Sreeshankar | Athletics | Men's long jump | 29 July 2026 |
| (silver) Silver | Mohammed Basil | Athletics | Men's 100 m T47 | 29 July 2026 |
| (silver) Silver | Lovepreet Singh | Weightlifting | Men's +110 kg | 30 July 2026 |
| (silver) Silver | Yamini Mourya | Judo | Women's 57 kg | 31 July 2026 |
| (silver) Silver | Neeraj Chopra | Athletics | Men's javelin throw | 31 July 2026 |
| (silver) Silver | Praveen Chithravel | Athletics | Men's triple jump | 1 August 2026 |
| (silver) Silver | Jadumani Singh Mandengbam | Boxing | Men's 55 kg | 1 August 2026 |
| (silver) Silver | Shubham Juyal | Athletics | Men's shot put F57 | 1 August 2026 |
| (silver) Silver | Lovlina Borgohain | Boxing | Women's 75 kg | 1 August 2026 |
| (silver) Silver | Narender Berwal | Boxing | Men's +90 kg | 1 August 2026 |
| (bronze) Bronze | Jhandu Kumar | Para Powerlifting | Men's heavyweight | 24 July 2026 |
| (bronze) Bronze | Bindyarani Devi Sorokhaibam | Weightlifting | Women's 58 kg | 27 July 2026 |
| (bronze) Bronze | Shilpa Shyla | Athletics | Women's shot put F57 | 27 July 2026 |
| (bronze) Bronze | Seema Kaliramna | Athletics | Women's discus throw | 30 July 2026 |
| (bronze) Bronze | Tejaswin Shankar | Athletics | Men's decathlon | 31 July 2026 |
| (bronze) Bronze | Yashvir Singh | Athletics | Men's javelin throw | 31 July 2026 |
| (bronze) Bronze | Selva Prabhu Thirumaran | Athletics | Men's triple jump | 1 August 2026 |
| (bronze) Bronze | Unnati Sharma | Judo | Women's 63 kg | 1 August 2026 |
| (bronze) Bronze | Gulveer Singh | Athletics | Men's 5,000 metres | 1 August 2026 |

Multiple medalist
| Name | Event | 1st place, gold medalist(s) | 2nd place, silver medalist(s) | 3rd place, bronze medalist(s) | Total |
| Gulveer Singh | Athletics | 0 | 1 | 1 | 2 |

== Competitors ==
The Sports Ministry approved a 191-member Indian contingent, comprising 126 athletes and 51 team officials, for the Games. On 12 July 2026, para swimmer Tejas Nandakumar's entry in the men's 50-metre freestyle S7 event was rejected due to an outdated international classification review status. The Indian contingent was further reduced to 122 athletes ahead of the start of the Games after three athletes were withdrawn. Weightlifter Dilbag Singh (men's 94 kg) was withdrawn after India's weightlifting quota was reduced due to five anti-doping violations during the qualification process for the Games. Judokas Arun Kumar (men's 73 kg) and Tulika Maan (women's +78 kg) were withdrawn for failing doping tests.

| Sport | Men | Women | Total |
|---|---|---|---|
| 3x3 basketball | 0 | 4 | 4 |
| Artistic gymnastics | 4 | 4 | 8 |
| Athletics | 31 | 12 | 43 |
| Bowls | 3 | 3 | 6 |
| Boxing | 7 | 7 | 14 |
| Judo | 6 | 6 | 12 |
| Para powerlifting | 4 | 3 | 7 |
| Swimming | 10 | 0 | 10 |
| Track Cycling | 6 | 1 | 7 |
| Weightlifting | 4 | 7 | 11 |
| Total | 75 | 47 | 122 |

== 3x3 basketball ==
=== Women's wheelchair ===
Squad

- Reena Gupta
- Ritu Irengbam
- Minakshi Jadhav
- Laxmi Rayannavar

Summary

| Team | Group stage | | | | Quarterfinal | Semifinal | Final / BM / CM | |
| Team | Opposition Score | Opposition Score | Opposition Score | Rank | Opposition Score | Opposition Score | Opposition Score | Rank |
|---|---|---|---|---|---|---|---|---|
| India | Wales; L 1–16 | Scotland; L 4–21 | Nigeria; L 6–7 | 4 | Did not advance | | | |

Group play

| Pos | Team | Pld | W | L | PF | PA | PD | Qualification |
|---|---|---|---|---|---|---|---|---|
| 1 | Scotland | 3 | 3 | 0 | 53 | 7 | +46 | Semi-finals |
| 2 | Wales | 3 | 2 | 1 | 35 | 18 | +17 | Quarter-finals |
| 3 | Nigeria | 3 | 1 | 2 | 9 | 39 | −30 | Quarter-finals |
| 4 | India | 3 | 0 | 3 | 11 | 44 | −33 | |

Source: Glasgow 2026
Rules for classification: 1) Wins; 2) Head-to-head record; 3) Points scored.

25 July 2026
12:05

Report

| Wales | 16–1 | India |
| Pts: Blease 7 | | Pts: Gupta 1 |

SEC Centre, Glasgow

26 July 2026
18:15

Report

| India | 4–21 | Scotland |
| Pts: Gupta 2 | | Pts: Smith 11 |

SEC Centre, Glasgow

27 July 2026
19:30

Report

| India | 6–7 | Nigeria |
| Pts: Jadhav 4 | | Pts: Adefala 6 |

SEC Centre, Glasgow

== Artistic gymnastics ==
India entered eight artistic gymnasts, four per gender.

Men
Team final and individual qualification

| Athlete | Event | Apparatus | | | | | | Total | Rank |
| Athlete | Event | FL | PH | SR | VT | PB | HB | Total | Rank |
|---|---|---|---|---|---|---|---|---|---|
| Tapeshwarnath Das | Team all-around | 9.500 | ~~7.200~~ | ~~11.100~~ | 11.750 | 10.000 | 11.450 | 61.000 | 27 |
| Swatish KP | Team all-around | —N/a | 10.300 | 12.450 | —N/a | | | | |
| Tapan Mohanty | Team all-around | 12.150 | 9.850 | 12.100 | 13.200 | 12.700 | 11.700 | 71.700 | 17 Q |
| Yogeshwar Singh | Team all-around | 10.600 | 11.100 | 11.500 | 12.800 | 12.750 | 12.650 | 71.400 | 18 Q |
| Total | Team all-around | 32.250 | 31.250 | 36.050 | 37.750 | 35.450 | 35.800 | 208.550 | 7 |

Individual final

| Athlete | Event | Final | | | | | | | |
| Athlete | Event | Apparatus | | | | | | Total | Rank |
| Athlete | Event | FL | PH | SR | VT | PB | HB | Total | Rank |
|---|---|---|---|---|---|---|---|---|---|
| Tapan Mohanty | All-around | 11.850 | 9.500 | 12.000 | 12.700 | 12.450 | 11.600 | 70.100 | 15 |
| Yogeshwar Singh | All-around | Did not start | | | | | | | |

Women
Team final & individual qualification

| Athlete | Event | Apparatus | | | | Total | Rank |
| Athlete | Event | VT | UB | BB | FL | Total | Rank |
|---|---|---|---|---|---|---|---|
| Pranati Nayak | Team all-around | 11.950 | —N/a | | | | |
| Nishka Agarwal | Team all-around | ~~11.450~~ | 9.350 | 9.000 | 8.750 | 38.550 | 34 |
| Eshita Rewale | Team all-around | 11.750 | 9.550 | 10.050 | 10.350 | 41.700 | 28 |
| Protistha Samanta | Team all-around | 12.950 Q | 8.500 | 10.050 | 10.750 | 42.250 | 27 |
| Total | Team all-around | 36.650 | 27.400 | 29.100 | 29.850 | 123.000 | 9 |

Individual final

| Athlete | Event | Qualification | | Final | |
| Athlete | Event | Score | Rank | Score | Rank |
|---|---|---|---|---|---|
| Protistha Samanta | Vault | 12.950 | 8 Q | 12.883 | 7 |

== Athletics ==
The 2026 National Federation Cup Senior Athletics Championships at Ranchi served as the selection trial for the 2026 Commonwealth Games. The Athletics Federation of India announced a 32-member squad for the Games.

Key

Ranks given for track events are within the athlete's heat only.

- Q = Automatic qualification – qualified by place (Track Events), qualified by standard (Field Events)
- q = Non-automatic qualification – qualified by time (Track Events), qualified by performance (Field Events)

Track

| Athlete | Event | Heat | | Semi-final | | Final | |
| Athlete | Event | Result | Rank | Result | Rank | Result | Rank |
|---|---|---|---|---|---|---|---|
| Gurindervir Singh | Men's 100 m | 10.39 | 2 | Did not advance | | | |
| Animesh Kujur | Men's 200 m | 20.46 | 1 q | 20.65 | 6 | Did not advance | |
| Vishal Thennarasu | Men's 400 m | 46.49 | 2 q | 46.33 | 6 | Did not advance | |
| Rajesh Ramesh | Men's 400 m | 47.43 | 3 | Did not advance | | | |
| Gulveer Singh | Men's 5000 m | —N/a | | | | 13:24.95 | 3rd place, bronze medalist(s) |
| Gulveer Singh | Men's 10,000 m | —N/a | | | | 27:49.78 | 2nd place, silver medalist(s) |
| Tejas Shirse | Men's 110 m hurdles | 13.76 | 3 Q | —N/a | | 15.39 | 8 |
| Yashas Palaksha | Men's 400 m hurdles | 49.65 | 3 q | —N/a | | 51.81 | 8 |
| Santhosh Kumar Tamilarasan | Men's 400 m hurdles | 49.51 | 3 q | —N/a | | 50.37 | 7 |
| Parul Chaudhary | Women's 3000 m steeplechase | —N/a | | | | 9:26.75 | 5 |
| Parul Chaudhary | Women's 5000 m | —N/a | | | | 15:08.6 | 13 |
| Priyanka Goswami | Women's 10,000 m walk | —N/a | | | | 45:53.93 SB | 4 |
| Ravina Gaikwad | Women's 10,000 m walk | —N/a | | | | DQ | |
| Vishal Thennarasu; Rajesh Ramesh; Rashdeep Kaur; Ansa Babu; Neeru Pathak | Mixed 4 x 400 m relay | 3:20.98 | 4 q | —N/a | | 3:20.32 | 6 |

Field

| Athlete | Event | Qualification | | Final | |
| Athlete | Event | Result | Rank | Result | Rank |
|---|---|---|---|---|---|
| Dev Meena | Men's pole vault | —N/a | | 5.30 | 4 |
| Kuldeep Kumar | Men's pole vault | —N/a | | 5.10 | 6 |
| Sarvesh Kushare | Men's high jump | —N/a | | 2.25 | 2nd place, silver medalist(s) |
| Adarsh Ram | Men's high jump | —N/a | | 2.15 | 5 |
| Tejaswin Shankar | Men's high jump | —N/a | | NM | |
| Murali Sreeshankar | Men's long jump | 8.01 | 3 Q | 8.09 | 2nd place, silver medalist(s) |
| Lokesh Sathyanathan | Men's long jump | 7.77 | 7 q | 7.97 | 5 |
| Praveen Chithravel | Men's triple jump | 16.41 | 2 q | 16.58 | 2nd place, silver medalist(s) |
| Selva Prabhu | Men's triple jump | 16.26 | 3 q | 16.52 | 3rd place, bronze medalist(s) |
| Samardeep Singh Gill | Men's shot put | 19.95 | 5 q | 20.03 | 7 |
| Tajinderpal Singh Toor | Men's shot put | 20.14 | 2 Q | 20.27 | 5 |
| Neeraj Chopra | Men's javelin throw | 79.61 | 5 q | 85.83 | 2nd place, silver medalist(s) |
| Rohit Yadav | Men's javelin throw | 78.37 | 9 q | 81.56 | 7 |
| Yashvir Singh | Men's javelin throw | 78.36 | 10 q | 85.41 | 3rd place, bronze medalist(s) |
| Pooja Singh | Women's high jump | —N/a | | 1.77 | 8 |
| Manpreet Kaur | Women's shot put | —N/a | | 17.49 | 4 |
| Seema Kaliramna | Women's discus throw | —N/a | | 58.65 | 3rd place, bronze medalist(s) |
| Nidhi Rani | Women's discus throw | —N/a | | 57.10 | 4 |

Combined

| Athlete | Event | Category | 100 m | LJ | SP | HJ | 400 m | 110H | DT | PV | JT | 1500 m | Total | Rank |
|---|---|---|---|---|---|---|---|---|---|---|---|---|---|---|
| Tejaswin Shankar | Men's decathlon | Result | 10.96 | 7.82 | 13.09 | 2.15 | 49.51 | 14.41 | 40.44 | 4.30 | 53.12 | 4:36.2 | 7976 | 3rd place, bronze medalist(s) |
| Tejaswin Shankar | Men's decathlon | Points | 870 | 1015 | 673 | 944 | 837 | 922 | 674 | 702 | 635 | 704 | 7976 | 3rd place, bronze medalist(s) |

=== Para-athletics ===
| Athlete | Event | Final | |
| Athlete | Event | Result | Rank |
|---|---|---|---|
| Rakeshbhai Bhatt | Men's 100 m (T38) | 11.82 SB | 5 |
| Shreyansh Trivedi | Men's 100 m (T38) | 12.22 SB | 6 |
| Mohammed Basil | Men's 100 m (T47) | 10.83 | 2nd place, silver medalist(s) |
| Dilip Gavit | Men's 100 m (T47) | 10.71 GR | 1st place, gold medalist(s) |
| Ramesh Shanmugam | Men's 1500 m (T54) | 3:23.59 | 7 |
| Devender Kumar | Men's discus throw (F44) | 48.20 | 7 |
| Sagar Thayat | Men's discus throw (F44) | 51.79 AR | 6 |
| Shubham Juyal | Men's shot put (F57) | 13.28 SB | 2nd place, silver medalist(s) |
| Soman Rana | Men's shot put (F57) | 13.40 SB | 1st place, gold medalist(s) |
| Sharmila Dhankar | Women's shot put (F57) | 9.81 SB | 1st place, gold medalist(s) |
| Shilpa Shyla | Women's shot put (F57) | 7.26 PB | 3rd place, bronze medalist(s) |

== Bowls ==
| Athlete | Event | Group play | | | | | | Semi-final | Final | Rank |
| Athlete | Event | Opposition Result | Opposition Result | Opposition Result | Opposition Result | Opposition Result | Rank | Opposition Result | Opposition Result | Rank |
|---|---|---|---|---|---|---|---|---|---|---|
| Putul Sonowal | Men's singles | Bester (CAN); W 1*–1 | Alexander (FLK); W 1*–1 | Dzulkeple (MAS); L 0–2 | Parnis (MLT); L 0.5–1.5 | Hamada (KEN); L 0.5–1.5 | 5 | Did not advance | | |
| Nayanmoni Saikia | Women's singles | Williams (WAL); L 0–2 | Whitehead (IOM); W 2–0 | Saroji (MAS); L 0.5–1.5 | Banda (ZAM); W 2–0 | Calitz (RSA); L 1–1* | 4 | Did not advance | | |
| Navneet Singh; Dinesh Kumar | Men's pairs | Cook Islands; W 1*–1 | Namibia; W 2–0 | Botswana; W 1*–1 | Falkland Islands; W 2–0 | England; L 1–1* | 2 | Did not advance | | |
| Rupa Rani Tirkey; Pinki Singh | Women's pairs | Malta; W 1*–1 | South Africa; W 2–0 | Tonga; W 1*–1 | Namibia; L 1–1* | England; L 1–1* | 3 | Did not advance | | |

Key

- W = Win
- L = Loss
- * = Win by a tiebreaker

== Boxing ==
Men

| Athlete | Event | Round of 32 | Round of 16 | Quarterfinals | Semifinals | Final | |
| Athlete | Event | Opposition Result | Opposition Result | Opposition Result | Opposition Result | Opposition Result | Rank |
|---|---|---|---|---|---|---|---|
| Jadumani Singh | 55 kg | Cullen (SCO); W 5–0 | Rehman (PAK); W 5–0 | Mwale (ZAM); W 5–0 | Haoseb (NAM); W 5–0 | Dixon (AUS); L 0–5 | 2nd place, silver medalist(s) |
| Sachin Siwach | 60 kg | Al-Ahmadieh (CAN); W 4–1 | Hewitt (ENG); W 4–1 | Moremi (BOT); W 5–0 | Harris-Allan (WAL); W 5–0 | Ndevelo (NAM); W 3–2 | 1st place, gold medalist(s) |
| Aditya Pratap Yadav | 65 kg | Bye | Batte (UGA); L 2–3 | Did not advance | | | 9 |
| Sumit Kundu | 70 kg | Bye | McConnell (NIR); L 1–4 | Did not advance | | | 9 |
| Ankush Panghal | 80 kg | Bye | Jan (ANT); W 5–0 | Micock (SEY); W 5–0 | Ofori (CAN); W 5–0 | Shittu (ENG); W 4–1 | 1st place, gold medalist(s) |
| Kapil Pokhariya | 90 kg | —N/a | Bye | McNulty (SCO); L 0–5 | Did not advance | | 5 |
| Narender Berwal | +90 kg | —N/a | | Seko (SAM); W 3–2 | Paul (TTO); W 5–0 | Thomas (ENG); L 0–5 | 2nd place, silver medalist(s) |

Women

| Athlete | Event | Round of 32 | Round of 16 | Quarterfinals | Semifinals | Final | |
| Athlete | Event | Opposition Result | Opposition Result | Opposition Result | Opposition Result | Opposition Result | Rank |
|---|---|---|---|---|---|---|---|
| Sakshi Chaudhary | 51 kg | —N/a | Modukanele (BOT); W 5–0 | Fryers (NIR); W 5–0 | Wall (CAN); W 5–0 | White (ENG); W 5–0 | 1st place, gold medalist(s) |
| Preeti Pawar | 54 kg | Bye | Mtenje (MAW); W RSC | Clyde (NIR); W 5–0 | Mwape (ZAM); W 5–0 | Delgado (CAN); W 5–0 | 1st place, gold medalist(s) |
| Jaismine Lamboria | 57 kg | —N/a | Bye | Glynn (ENG); W 4–1 | Maselele (LES); W RSC | Walsh (NIR); W 5–0 | 1st place, gold medalist(s) |
| Priya Ghanghas | 60 kg | —N/a | Bye | Mitchell (SCO); W 4–1 | Kings-Wheatley (ENG); W 5–0 | Al-Ahmadieh (CAN); W 4–1 | 1st place, gold medalist(s) |
| Parveen Hooda | 65 kg | —N/a | | Hickey (ENG); L 2–3 | Did not advance | | 5 |
| Arundhati Choudhary | 70 kg | —N/a | | Henderson (NZL); W 3–1 | Eccles (WAL); W 4–0 | Reid (ENG); W 5–0 | 1st place, gold medalist(s) |
| Lovlina Borgohain | 75 kg | —N/a | | Bye | Taafaki (TUV); W 5–0 | Greentree (AUS); L 1–4 | 2nd place, silver medalist(s) |

Key

- W = Win
- L = Loss

== Judo ==
Men

| Athlete | Event | Round of 32 | Round of 16 | Quarterfinal | Semi-final/Repechage | Final / BM | Rank |
| Athlete | Event | Opposition Result | Opposition Result | Opposition Result | Opposition Result | Opposition Result | Rank |
|---|---|---|---|---|---|---|---|
| Harsh Singh | 60 kg | —N/a | Kathewera (MAW); W 100s1–0s1 | Monthouel (VAN); W 102–0 | Neto (AUS); W 10s1–0s2 | Katz (AUS); W 10–0 | 1st place, gold medalist(s) |
| Rohit Majgul | 66 kg | Bye | Ribeiro (MOZ); W 100s1–0s1 | Christodoulides (CYP); L 0s2–1s1 | Fryer (ENG); L 1–2s1 | Did not advance | 7 |
| Harsh Tokas | 81 kg | —N/a | Bye | Georgakis (CYP); L 0s2–1s2 | Percival (SAM); W 101–0 | Ochi (AUS); L 0s2–100s1 | 5 |
| Karanjit Maan | 90 kg | —N/a | Connolly (NZL); W 100s1–0s2 | Gaulin (CAN); L 0s1–110 | Cusack (SCO); L 0s3–100s2 | Did not advance | 7 |
| Avtar Singh | 100 kg | —N/a | Aristos (CYP); L 0s1–100s2 | Did not advance | | | 9 |
| Yash Ghanghas | +100 kg | —N/a | Whitehouse (WAL); L 0s2–1 | Did not advance | | | 9 |

Women

| Athlete | Event | Round of 16 | Quarterfinal | Semi-final/Repechage | Final / BM | Rank |
| Athlete | Event | Opposition Result | Opposition Result | Opposition Result | Opposition Result | Rank |
|---|---|---|---|---|---|---|
| Asmita Dey | 48 kg | —N/a | Ewing (SCO); W 100–0 | Shaw (SCO); W 1s2–0 | Quach (CAN); W 2s1–1 | 1st place, gold medalist(s) |
| Shraddha Chopade | 52 kg | Massaquoi (SLE); W 100–0 | Easton (AUS); L 1–0s2 | Hodson (WAL); L 0s2–1s2 | Did not advance | 7 |
| Yamini Mourya | 57 kg | Bye | Agyei (GHA); W 100–0 | Breytenbach (RSA); W 100–0 | Toprak (ENG); L 0s3–100s2 | 2nd place, silver medalist(s) |
| Unnati Sharma | 63 kg | Magagula (SWZ); W 100–0 | Christie (NZL); W 11–0 | Middleton (AUS); L 1–100s1 | Knoester (RSA); W 100–0 | 3rd place, bronze medalist(s) |
| Inunganbi Takhellambam | 70 kg | Bye | Thibault (CAN); L 0s1–101s1 | Yeats-Brown (ENG); L 0s1–100 | Did not advance | 7 |
| Ishroop Narang | 78 kg | Wood (SCO); W 1s2–0s1 | Reid (ENG); L 0s2–100 | Djengue Moune (CMR); W 10s1–2s1 | Godbout (CAN); L 0s2–1s1 | 5 |

Key

- W = Win
- L = Loss
- s1 = Shido 1
- s2 = Shido 2
- s3 = Hansoku-make resulting from 'progressive' penalties awarded during the contest

== Para powerlifting ==
| Athlete | Event | Weight Lifted | Points | Rank |
|---|---|---|---|---|
| Ashok Kumar Malik | Men's lightweight | 395 | 143.8 | 4 |
| Parmjeet Kumar | Men's lightweight | 176 | 135.6 | 7 |
| Sudhir Lath | Men's heavyweight | 365 | 114.1 | 6 |
| Jhandu Kumar | Men's heavyweight | 371 | 130.9 | 3rd place, bronze medalist(s) |
| Suman Devi | Women's lightweight | 100 | 88.4 | 7 |
| Jaspreet Kaur | Women's lightweight | 195 | 96.4 | 6 |
| Kasthuri Rajamani | Women's heavyweight | NM | DNF | |

== Swimming ==
Men

| Athlete | Event | Heat | | Semifinal | | Final | |
| Athlete | Event | Time | Rank | Time | Rank | Time | Rank |
|---|---|---|---|---|---|---|---|
| Suyash Jadhav | 50 m freestyle S7 | 35.35 | 6 Q | —N/a | | 31.63 | 4 |
| Chaitanya Kulkarni | 50 m freestyle S7 | 32.77 | 4 Q | —N/a | | 33.17 | 5 |
| Ali Imam | 50 m freestyle S13 | 28.41 | 8 Q | —N/a | | 28.28 | 8 |
| Ravi Budigina | 50 m freestyle S13 | 26.33 | 6 Q | —N/a | | 25.68 | 6 |
| Ravi Budigina | 100 m freestyle S13 | 57.10 | 3 Q | —N/a | | 57.57 | 4 |
| Ali Imam | 100 m freestyle S13 | 1:05.32 | 8 Q | —N/a | | 1:03.73 | 7 |
| Aneesh Gowda | 200 m freestyle | 1:51.64 | 18 | —N/a | | Did not advance | |
| Sajan Prakash | 200 m freestyle | 1:51.99 | 20 | —N/a | | Did not advance | |
| Dhakshan Shashikumar | 400 m freestyle | 3:58.09 | 15 | Did not advance | | | |
| Aryan Nehra | 400 m freestyle | 4:00.26 | 16 | Did not advance | | | |
| Aryan Nehra | 800 m freestyle | —N/a | | | | 7:59.36 | 8 |
| Aryan Nehra | 1500 m freestyle | —N/a | | | | 15:36.25 | 7 |
| Swatik Patil | 100 m breaststroke SB9 | 1:15.85 | 6 Q | —N/a | | 1:15.82 | 5 |
| Srihari Nataraj | 50 m backstroke | 25.52 | 14 Q | 25.29 | 11 | Did not advance | |
| Srihari Nataraj | 100 m backstroke | 55.58 | 13 Q | 55.52 | 13 | Did not advance | |
| Sajan Prakash | 50 m butterfly | 24.94 | 28 | Did not advance | | | |
| Sajan Prakash | 200 m butterfly | 1:58.59 | 6 Q | —N/a | | 1:58.05 | 8 |
| Dhakshan Shashikumar; Aneesh Gowda; Aryan Nehra; Srihari Nataraj | 4 × 200 m freestyle relay | 7:39.48 | 6 Q | —N/a | | 7:29.84 | 6 |

Key

- Q = Qualified for the next round

== Track cycling ==
Sprint

| Athlete | Event | Qualification | | Quarterfinals | Semifinals | Final / BM | |
| Athlete | Event | Time | Rank | Opposition Time | Opposition Time | Opposition Time | Rank |
|---|---|---|---|---|---|---|---|
| David Elkatohchoongo | Men's individual sprint | 10.488 | 25 | Did not advance | | | |
| Rojit Yanglem | Men's individual sprint | 10.297 | 22 | Did not advance | | | |
| Ronaldo Laitonjam | Men's individual sprint | 10.331 | 24 | Did not advance | | | |
| David Elkatohchoongo; Rojit Yanglem; Ronaldo Laitonjam | Men's team sprint | 46.396 | 7 | Did not advance | | | |

Individual pursuit

| Athlete | Event | Qualification | | Final / BM | |
| Athlete | Event | Time | Rank | Time | Rank |
|---|---|---|---|---|---|
| Dinesh Kumar | Men's individual pursuit | 4:29.267 | 17 | Did not advance | |
| Harshveer Sekhon | Men's individual pursuit | 4:35.524 | 19 | Did not advance | |
| Lisha Das | Women's individual pursuit C4-5 | 6:58.000 | 6 | Did not advance | |

Time trial

| Athlete | Event | Time | Rank |
|---|---|---|---|
| Ronaldo Laitonjam | Men's 1 km time trial | 1:04.191 | 20 |
| Lisha Das | Women's 1 km time trial C4-5 | 1:34.410 | 6 |

Elimination and scratch races

| Athlete | Event | Qualification | Final |
|---|---|---|---|
| Harshveer Sekhon | Men's elimination race | —N/a | 21 |
| Dinesh Kumar | Men's scratch race | DNF | Did not advance |
| Harshveer Sekhon | Men's scratch race | DNF | Did not advance |

Points race

| Athlete | Event | Qualification | | Final | |
| Athlete | Event | Points | Rank | Points | Rank |
|---|---|---|---|---|---|
| Dinesh Kumar | Men's points race | 4 | 11 | Did not advance | |
| Harshveer Sekhon | Men's points race | DNF | | Did not advance | |

Keirin

| Athlete | Event | First round | Repechage | Second round | Final |
| Athlete | Event | Rank | Rank | Rank | Rank |
|---|---|---|---|---|---|
| David Elkatohchoongo | Men's keirin | 5 R | 4 | Did not advance | |
| Jemsh Keithellakram | Men's keirin | 5 R | 4 | Did not advance | |
| Ronaldo Laitonjam | Men's keirin | 7 R | 5 | Did not advance | |

Key

- Q = Qualified for the next round
- R = Qualified for the repechage round

== Weightlifting ==
Men

| Athlete | Event | Snatch | | Clean & Jerk | | Total | Rank |
| Athlete | Event | Result | Rank | Result | Rank | Total | Rank |
|---|---|---|---|---|---|---|---|
| Rishikanta Singh Chanambam | 60 kg | 121 GR | 1 | 143 | 3 | 264 | 2nd place, silver medalist(s) |
| Muthupandi Raja | 65 kg | 126 | 2 | 160 | 2 | 286 | 2nd place, silver medalist(s) |
| Ajaya Babu | 79 kg | 149 GR | 1 | 181 | 2 | 330 | 2nd place, silver medalist(s) |
| Lovepreet Singh | +110 kg | 176 GR | 1 | 212 | 2 | 388 | 2nd place, silver medalist(s) |

Women

| Athlete | Event | Snatch | | Clean & Jerk | | Total | Rank |
| Athlete | Event | Result | Rank | Result | Rank | Total | Rank |
|---|---|---|---|---|---|---|---|
| Mirabai Chanu | 48 kg | 85 CR GR | 1 | 105 GR | 1 | 190 GR | 1st place, gold medalist(s) |
| Gyaneshwari Yadav | 53 kg | 88 | 2 | 111 | 2 | 199 NR | 2nd place, silver medalist(s) |
| Bindyarani Devi Sorokhaibam | 58 kg | 87 | 3 | 112 | 3 | 199 | 3rd place, bronze medalist(s) |
| Nirupama Devi Seram | 63 kg | 93 | 5 | NM | | DNF | |
| Harjinder Kaur | 69 kg | 101 | 2 | 126 | 2 | 227 | 2nd place, silver medalist(s) |
| Sanjana Panchal | 77 kg | NM | | | | DNF | |
| Martina Devi Maibam | +86 kg | 105 | 5 | 140 | 3 | 245 | 5 |
