= Shilpa Shyla =

Indian Paralympic athlete

Personal information
- Full name: Shilpa Kanchugarakoppalu Shyla
- Nationality: Indian
- Born: 25 February 1989 (age 37) Karnataka, India
- Occupation: Teacher

Sport
- Sport: Para-athletics
- Disability class: F57
- Events: Shot put, Discus throw
Medal record
Women's para-athletics
Representing India
Commonwealth Games
Bronze medal – third place	2026 Glasgow	Shot put F57

Shilpa Kanchugarakoppalu Shyla (born 25 February 1989) is an Indian para-athlete who competes in the shot put and discus throw events in the F57 classification. She won the bronze medal in the women's shot put F57 at the 2026 Commonwealth Games.

== Early life ==
Shilpa Shyla was born in an agricultural family Kanchugarakoppalu village in Mysuru district of Karnataka and belongs to a farming family. She lost one of her legs in a motor accident at the age of four. She completed Master of Arts and Bachelor of Education, and moved to Mysuru after taking up a teaching position at a private school in 2019.

Shyla initially took up the sport of sitting volleyball. She later switched to para-athletics in 2023 on the advice of her volleyball coach, Raghavendra. She specialised in the seated throwing events of shot put and discus throw.

== Career ==
Shyla competes in the F57 disability classification. She won the bronze medal in the women's javelin throw F42/45/46/64 event at the 2023 World Abilitysport Games held in Nakhon Ratchasima, Thailand. She had won multiple medals including a gold, and two silvers at the Indian National Para Athletics Championships. She won gold in shot put in the 2nd Khelo India Para Games in New Delhi in 2025. She won gold medals in shot put in the World Para Athletics Grand Prix events in New Delhi in 2025 and 2026, and a bronze in discus throw in the World Para Athletics Grand Prix event in Dubai in February 2026.

Shyla was part of the Indian contingent for the 2026 Commonwealth Games in Glasgow. At the Commonwealth Games, she competed in the women's shot put F57 event. She recorded a personal-best throw of 7.26 m (23.8 ft) in her third attempt and initially finished fourth. However, following the conclusion of the competition, the Indian contingent challenged the validity of Nigerian athlete Eucharia Iyiazi's only legal throw. After an official review, the attempt was ruled a foul and Iyiazi was disqualified from the final standings. As a result, Shyla was upgraded to the bronze medal. As compatriot Sharmila Dhankar had earlier won the gold medal in the same event, this was India's first-ever double podium finish in a para-athletics event at the Games.

== See also ==
- India at the 2026 Commonwealth Games
