= Athletics at the 2026 Commonwealth Games – Men's 400 metres hurdles =

Men's 400 metres hurdles at the 2026 Commonwealth Games
- Venue: Scotstoun Stadium, Glasgow
- Dates: 29 July 2026 (round 1); 31 July 2026 (final)
- Winning time: 48.47

Medalists
gold medal	Ezekiel Nathaniel	Nigeria
silver medal	Jake Minshull	England
bronze medal	Assinie Wilson	Jamaica

The men's 400 metres hurdles at the 2026 Commonwealth Games, as part of the athletics programme, took place at the Scotstoun Stadium from 29 to 31 July 2026.

== Records ==
Prior to this competition, the existing world, Commonwealth and Commonwealth Games records were as follows:

Men's 400 m hurdles
World record	45.94	Karsten Warholm (NOR)	3 Aug 2021	Tokyo, Japan
Commonwealth record	47.10	Samuel Matete (ZAM)	7 Aug 1991	Zürich, Switzerland
Games record	48.05	Louis van Zyl (RSA)	23 Mar 2006	Melbourne, Australia

== Schedule ==
The schedule is as follows:

Date	Time	Round
29 July 2026	19:33	Round 1
31 July 2026	21:00	Final

All times are United Kingdom time (UTC+1)

== Results ==
=== Round 1 ===
Round 1 was held on the morning of 29 July 2026.

==== Heat 1 ====
Place	Lane	Athlete	Nation	Time	Notes
1	1	Seamus Derbyshire	England	48.74	Q
2	2	Dennick Luke	Dominica	49.07	Q
3	8	Yashas Palaksha	India	49.65	q
4	5	Kemorena Tisang	Botswana	50.05	
5	3	Rasheeme Griffith	Barbados	50.08	
6	6	Baba Mohammed	Ghana	51.48	
7	7	Najimul Hossain Roni	Bangladesh	52.90	SB
8	4	Edio Mussacate	Mozambique	53.59	SB

==== Heat 2 ====
Place	Lane	Athlete	Nation	Time	Notes
1	7	Ezekiel Nathaniel	Nigeria	48.69	Q
2	6	Jake Minshull	England	48.88	Q
3	8	Santhosh Kumar Tamilarasan	India	49.51	q
4	2	Kipkorir Rotich	Kenya	50.39	
5	4	Sabelo Dhlamini	South Africa	50.68	
6	3	Daniel Baul	Papua New Guinea	52.83	SB
7	5	Asitha Tharanga Lekamlage	Sri Lanka	53.04	

==== Heat 3 ====
Place	Lane	Athlete	Nation	Time	Notes
1	7	Alastair Chalmers	Guernsey	48.92	Q
2	5	Assinie Wilson	Jamaica	49.19	Q
3	8	Ayomal Akalanka	Sri Lanka	50.27	
4	3	Matthew Hunt	Australia	50.33	
5	4	David Moulongou	Canada	51.00	
6	1	William Camilus Peka	Papua New Guinea	54.16	SB
7	6	Moses Koroma	Sierra Leone	54.58	SB
8	2	Joshua Faulds	England	DQ	TR22.6.1

=== Final ===
The final will take place in the evening of 31 July 2026.

Place	Lane	Athlete	Nation	Time	Notes
1st place, gold medalist(s)	6	Ezekiel Nathaniel	Nigeria	48.47	
2nd place, silver medalist(s)	7	Jake Minshull	England	48.99	
3rd place, bronze medalist(s)	8	Assinie Wilson	Jamaica	49.22	
4	3	Dennick Luke	Dominica	49.27	
5	5	Seamus Derbyshire	England	49.45	
6	4	Alastair Chalmers	Guernsey	50.24	
7	2	Santhosh Kumar Tamilarasan	India	50.37	
8	1	Yashas Palaksha	India	51.81	
