= Kenya at the 2026 Commonwealth Games =

- Flag of Kenya
- CG code: KEN
- CGA: National Olympic Committee of Kenya
- Website: teamkenya.or.ke

in Glasgow, Scotland 23 July 2026 – 2 August 2026
- Competitors: 98 in 8 sports
- Flag bearer: Robert Okaka
- Baton bearer: Hellen Wawira
- Medals Ranked 13th: Gold 3 Silver 4 Bronze 5 Total 12

Commonwealth Games appearances (overview)
- 1954; 1958; 1962; 1966; 1970; 1974; 1978; 1982; 1986; 1990; 1994; 1998; 2002; 2006; 2010; 2014; 2018; 2022; 2026; 2030

Kenya competed at the 2026 Commonwealth Games in Glasgow, Scotland. This marked Kenya's 17th appearance at the Commonwealth Games after making its debut in 1938.

The Kenyan delegation consisted of 98 athletes. The team competed in eight sports.

Boxer Robert Okaka was the country's flagbearer during the opening ceremony. Meanwhile, para powerlifter Hellen Wawira was the baton bearer during the opening ceremony.

== Competitors ==
The following is the list of number of competitors participating at the Games per sport/discipline.

Sport		Men	Women	Total
3x3 basketball		8	4	12
Athletics		33	23	56
Bowls		2	2	4
Boxing		2	2	4
Judo		2	2	4
Swimming		2	2	4
Track cycling		2	4	6
Weightlifting	Para powerlifting	1	3	4
Weightlifting	Weightlifting	1	3	4
Total		53	45	98

== Medallists ==
The following Kenyan competitors won medals at the games. In the by discipline sections below, medallists' names are bolded.

Medal	Name	Sport	Event	Date	Ref.
Gold	Edmund Serem	Athletics	Men's 3000 m steeplechase	27 July	
Gold	Faith Cherotich	Athletics	Women's 3000 m steeplechase	29 July	
Gold	Mathew Kipsang	Athletics	Men's 5000 m	1 August	
Silver	Diana Wanza	Athletics	Women's 10,000 metres	27 July	
Silver	Simon Koech	Athletics	Men's 3000 m steeplechase	27 July	
Silver	Stephen Kihu	Athletics	Men's 10,000 m walk	31 July	
Silver	Lilian Odira	Athletics	Women's 800 metres	31 July	
Bronze	Joshua Mboya	Weightlifting	Men's 60 kg	26 July	
Bronze	Leonard Bett	Athletics	Men's 3000 m steeplechase	27 July	
Bronze	Irene Jepkemboi	Athletics	Women's javelin throw	1 August	
Bronze	Wycliffe Kinyamal	Athletics	Men's 800 m	1 August	
Bronze	Timothy Cheruiyot	Athletics	Men's mile	1 August	

== 3x3 basketball ==
Kenya qualified a men's and women's 3x3 basketball teams, and received a bipartite invitation to the men's wheelchair competition.

Summary

Team	Event	Group stage						Quarterfinal	Semifinal	Final / BM / CM	
Team	Event	Opposition Score	Opposition Score	Opposition Score	Opposition Score	Opposition Score	Rank	Opposition Score	Opposition Score	Opposition Score	Rank
Kenya men's	Men's tournament	Singapore; L 16–19	Malaysia; L 15–21	England; L 9–21	Jamaica; W 22–12	Fiji; W 22–9	4	Did not advance			7
Kenya women's	Women's tournament	Australia; L 5–21	Fiji; W 16–14 (OT)	Uganda; L 5–21	Jamaica; L 16–21	Cayman Islands; W 22–8	4	Did not advance			8
Kenya men's wheelchair	Men's wheelchair tournament	Canada; L 3–16	Australia; L 5–21	England; L 0–21	—N/a		4	Did not advance			8

=== Men's tournament ===
Roster
Kenya's roster consisted of four athletes.

- Denis Aduol
- David Gichohi
- Brans Nzioka
- Rodney Olang

Group B

Pos	Team	Pld	W	L	PF	PA	PD	Qualification
1	England	5	5	0	105	70	+35	Direct to semi-finals
2	Malaysia	5	4	1	103	82	+21	Quarter-finals
3	Singapore	5	2	3	88	86	+2	Quarter-finals
4	Kenya	5	2	3	82	82	0	
5	Fiji	5	1	4	66	97	−31	
6	Jamaica	5	1	4	77	104	−27	

Source: Glasgow 2026
Rules for classification: 1) Wins; 2) Head-to-head record; 3) Points scored.

25 July 2026
10:00

Report

Singapore	19–16	Kenya
Pts: Nur 7		Pts: Olang 8

SEC, Glasgow

25 July 2026
17:25

Report

Kenya	15–21	Malaysia
Pts: Gichohi 7		Pts: Ting 10

SEC, Glasgow

25 July 2026
19:50

Report

England	21–9	Kenya
Pts: Lautier-Ogunleye 8		Pts: Gichohi 5

SEC, Glasgow

27 July 2026
15:15

Report

Kenya	22–12	Jamaica
Pts: Gichohi 11		Pts: Lawrence Anderson 6

SEC, Glasgow

27 July 2026
19:05

Report

Kenya	22–9	Fiji
Pts: Gichohi 14		Pts: Sewabu 4

SEC, Glasgow

=== Women's tournament ===
Roster
Kenya's roster consisted of four athletes.

- Babra Achieng
- Esther Minayo
- Yvone Okello
- Mary Omondi

Group A

Pos	Team	Pld	W	L	PF	PA	PD	Qualification
1	Australia	5	5	0	105	33	+72	Direct to semi-finals
2	Uganda	5	4	1	90	58	+32	Quarter-finals
3	Jamaica	5	3	2	89	75	+14	Quarter-finals
4	Kenya	5	2	3	63	85	−22	
5	Fiji	5	1	4	56	81	−25	
6	Cayman Islands	5	0	5	29	100	−71	

Source: Glasgow 2026
Rules for classification: 1) Wins; 2) Head-to-head record; 3) Points scored.

24 July 2026
10:25

Report

Australia	21–5	Kenya
Pts: Clarke 9		Pts: Minayo 2

SEC, Glasgow

24 July 2026
17:00

Report

Kenya	16–14 (OT)	Fiji
Pts: Omondi 6		Pts: Kainamoli 6

SEC, Glasgow

24 July 2026
20:15

Report

Uganda	21–5	Kenya
Pts: Asinde 10		Pts: Omondi 3

SEC, Glasgow

26 July 2026
15:15

Report

Kenya	16–21	Jamaica
Pts: Omondi 7		Pts: Reynolds 13

SEC, Glasgow

26 July 2026
19:05

Report

Kenya	22–8	Cayman Islands
Pts: Minayo, Omondi 7		Pts: Watson 3

SEC, Glasgow

=== Men's wheelchair tournament ===
Roster
Kenya's roster consisted of four athletes.

- Ian Chege
- Milton Ilahuya
- Itaken Kipelian
- Robert Ngugi

Group A

Pos	Team	Pld	W	L	PF	PA	PD	Qualification
1	England	3	3	0	57	23	+34	Semi-finals
2	Australia	3	2	1	54	33	+21	Play-ins
3	Canada	3	1	2	38	43	−5	Play-ins
4	Kenya	3	0	3	8	58	−50	

Source: Glasgow 2026
Rules for classification: 1) Wins; 2) Head-to-head record; 3) Points scored.

24 July 2026
12:40

Report

Canada	16–3	Kenya
Pts: De'Aeth 8		Pts: Ngugi 2

SEC Centre, Glasgow

26 July 2026
12:20

Report

Australia	21–5	Kenya
Pts: Klein 8		Pts: Ilahuya 4

SEC Centre, Glasgow

27 July 2026
14:25

Report

Kenya	0–21	England
		Pts: Harvey, Knight 6

SEC Centre, Glasgow

== Athletics ==
Following the Kenyan Commonwealth Games trials in Nairobi, Athletics Kenya selected a 54-member team for the 2026 Games in Glasgow.

Key

Ranks given for track events are within the athlete's heat only.

- Q = Qualified for the next round
- q = Qualified for the next round as a fastest loser or, in field events, by position without achieving the qualifying target

Men
Track events

Athlete	Event	Heat		Semifinal		Final	
Athlete	Event	Result	Rank	Result	Rank	Result	Rank
Ferdinand Omanyala	100 metres	bye		10.15	6	Did not advance	
Meshack Babu	100 metres	10.21	2 q	10.39	8	Did not advance	
Mark Otieno	100 metres	10.38	4	Did not advance			
Zablon Ekwam	200 metres	20.42 SB	1 q	20.64	6	Did not advance	
Elkana Kiprotich Sabila	200 metres	DQ		Did not advance			
Kelvin Tonui	400 metres	45.69	1 q	46.69	7	Did not advance	
Boniface Mweresa	400 metres	—N/a		46.24	5	Did not advance	
George Mutinda	400 metres	46.50	2 q	47.22	8	Did not advance	
Wyclife Kinyamal	800 metres	1:46.79	1 Q	1:44.91	1 Q	1:46.12	3rd place, bronze medalist(s)
Kelvin Kimtai Loti	800 metres	1:47.22	1 Q	1:45.09	1 Q	1:48.37	8
Nicholas Kiplagat	800 metres	1:45.99	4 q	1:47.58	7	Did not advance	
Timothy Cheruiyot	Mile	3:58.98	2 Q	—N/a		3:55.41	3rd place, bronze medalist(s)
Reynold Cheruiyot	Mile	DNF		Did not advance			
Brian Komen	Mile	3:54.94	4 Q	—N/a		3:59.33	13
Mathew Kipsang	5000 metres	—N/a				13:23.61	1st place, gold medalist(s)
Cornelius Kemboi	5000 metres	—N/a				13:24.99	4
Andrew Alamisi	5000 metres	—N/a				13:30.35	10
Ishmael Kipkurui	10,000 metres	—N/a				28:04.66 SB	10
Edwin Kurgat	10,000 metres	—N/a				27:50.98 SB	4
Daniel Ebenyo	10,000 metres	—N/a				27:56.35 PB	6
Kipkorir Rotich	400 metre hurdles	50.39	4	—N/a		Did not advance	
Simon Koech	3000 metre steeplechase	—N/a				8:18.59	2nd place, silver medalist(s)
Edmund Serem	3000 metre steeplechase	—N/a				8:18.23	1st place, gold medalist(s)
Leonard Kipkemoi Bett	3000 metre steeplechase	—N/a				8:21.63	3rd place, bronze medalist(s)
Stephen Ndangiri Kihu	10,000 metre race walk	—N/a				38:46.57 PB	2nd place, silver medalist(s)
Mark Odhiambo; Zablon Ekwam; Meshack Babu; Elkana Kiprotich Sabila	4 × 100 metres relay	39.66	4 q	—N/a		39.74	7

Field events

Athlete	Event	Qualification		Final	
Athlete	Event	Distance	Rank	Distance	Rank
Isaac Kirwa Yego	Long jump	7.63	12 q	7.28	12
Asbel Kiprop Kemboi	High jump	—N/a		2.00	12
Kevin Kiprono Kemboi	Triple jump	15.55	9 q	DNS	
Isaac Kirwa Yego	Triple jump	16.14	4 q	16.31 SB	5
Dominic Ongidi Abunda	Hammer throw	—N/a		60.87	8
Julius Yego	Javelin throw	74.50	13	Did not advance	

Combined events Decathlon

Athlete	Event	100 m	LJ	SP	HJ	400 m	110H	DT	PV	JT	1500 m	Final	Rank
Edwin Too	Result	11.03	7.39	9.91	1.91	51.19	15.91	36.91	3.70	43.36	4:50.53	6686	10
Edwin Too	Points	854	908	480	723	761	743	602	509	491	615	6686	10

Women
Track events

Athlete	Event	Heat		Semifinal		Final	
Athlete	Event	Result	Rank	Result	Rank	Result	Rank
Millicent Ndoro	200 metres	23.45	2 q	23.37	7	Did not advance	
Mercy Oketch	400 metres	—N/a		52.85	3	Did not advance	
Mercy Chebet	400 metres	53.16	4 q	53.49	5	Did not advance	
Lilian Odira	800 metres	2:01.05	1 Q	1:59.39	1 Q	2:00.58	2nd place, silver medalist(s)
Janet Jepkemoi Amimo	800 metres	2:02.30	3 Q	2:02.08	5	Did not advance	
Vivian Chebet	800 metres	2:13.00	6	Did not advance			
Naomi Korir	Mile	4:31.80 SB	4 Q	—N/a		4:40.62	5
Teresiah Muthoni Gateri	Mile	4:33.11 SB	1 Q	—N/a		4:40.93	8
Rosemary Longisa	Mile	4:32.02	5 Q	—N/a		4:42.75	9
Caroline Nyaga	5000 metres	—N/a				14:54.00	6
Rebecca Mwangi	5000 metres	—N/a				15:50.48	18
Diana Wanza	10,000 metres	—N/a				31:50.13	2nd place, silver medalist(s)
Miriam Chebet	10,000 metres	—N/a				32:12.97	7
Rukia Nusra Omulisia	100 metre hurdles	13.10	5	—N/a		Did not advance	
Vanice Kerubo Nyakisera	400 metre hurdles	56.43	3 Q	—N/a		56.67	8
Celestine Biwot	3000 metre steeplechase	—N/a				9:33.61	7
Faith Cherotich	3000 metre steeplechase	—N/a				9:01.76 GR	1st place, gold medalist(s)
Sylvia Jerono Kemboi	10,000 metre race walk	—N/a				51:30.80	5

Field events

Athlete	Event	Qualification		Final	
Athlete	Event	Distance	Rank	Distance	Rank
Faith Kipsang Jepkemboi	Long jump	6.23	12 q	6.46	9
Belinda Adhiambo Oburu	Shot put	—N/a		16.09	7
Irene Jepkemboi	Javelin throw	—N/a		57.85	3rd place, bronze medalist(s)

Mixed

Athlete	Event	Qualification		Final	
Athlete	Event	Time	Rank	Time	Rank
Kelvin Tonui; Mercy Chebet; Boniface Mweresa; Mercy Oketch	4 × 400 metres relay	3:15.92	2 Q	3:13.95	4

== Bowls ==
Kenya entered four bowlers, two men and two women.

Athlete	Event	Group Stage						Semifinal	Final / BM	
Athlete	Event	Opposition Score	Opposition Score	Opposition Score	Opposition Score	Opposition Score	Rank	Opposition Score	Opposition Score	Rank
Anwar Hamada	Men's singles	Parnis (MLT); L 0–2	Bester (CAN); L 0–2	Alexander (FLK); L 0–2	Dzulkeple (MAS); L 0–2	Sonowal (IND); L 1.5–0.5	6	Did not advance		
Anwar Hamada; Chris Kimanga	Men's pairs	Isle of Man; L 0–2	South Africa; L 0–2	Canada; L 0–2	Scotland; L 0–2	Norfolk Island; L 0–2	6	Did not advance		
Eunice Wambui Mbugua	Women's singles	Viljoen (NAM); L 0–2	McGrouther (SCO); L 0.5–1.5	Nathan (TGA); W 2–0	Wilson (NFK); L 1–1*	Moceiwai (FIJ); L 1–1*	5	Did not advance		
Nancy Cheruiyot; Eunice Wambui Mbugua	Women's pairs	New Zealand; L 1–1*	Canada; L 0–2	Fiji; L 0.5–1.5	Wales; L 0–2	Botswana; L 1–1*	6	Did not advance		

== Boxing ==
Kenya entered four boxer (two men and two women).

Athlete	Event	Round of 32	Round of 16	Quarterfinals	Semifinals	Final	
Athlete	Event	Opposition Result	Opposition Result	Opposition Result	Opposition Result	Opposition Result	Rank
Boniface Maina	Men's 70 kg	Bye	Kerr (SCO); L 0–3	Did not advance			
Robert Okaka	Men's 80 kg	Bye	Changalawe (TAN); W 5–0	Shittu (ENG); L 0–5	Did not advance		
Amina Faki	Women's 54 kg	Mackie (ENG); L 0–5	Did not advance				
Rosemarion Otieno	Women's 60 kg	—N/a	Bye	Al-Ahmadieh (CAN); L 1–4	Did not advance		

== Judo ==
Kenya entered for judoka (two men and two women).

Athlete	Event	Preliminaries	Round of 16	Quarterfinals	Semifinals	Repechage	Final/BM	
Athlete	Event	Opposition Result	Opposition Result	Opposition Result	Opposition Result	Opposition Result	Opposition Result	Rank
Regan Wali	Men's 60 kg	—N/a	Wickrama (SRI); W 003s1–002	Neto (AUS); L 000s1–001s2	Did not advance	Monthouel (VAN); W 100–000	Ayre (ENG); L 000–112	5
Felix Okoko	Men's 66 kg	Bell (WAL); L 002–100s1	Did not advance					
Mary Njeri	Women's 70 kg	—N/a	Yeats-Brown (ENG); L 000–102	Did not advance				
Zeddy Cherotich	Women's 78 kg	—N/a	Joseph (MRI); W 100–011	Swan (AUS); L 000s1–110s1	Did not advance	Ludford (ENG); L 000–110	Did not advance	7

== Swimming ==
Kenya entered four swimmers, two men and two women.

Athlete	Event	Heat		Semifinal		Final	
Athlete	Event	Time	Rank	Time	Rank	Time	Rank
Haniel Kudwoli	Men's 50 m freestyle	24.07	37	Did not advance			
Haniel Kudwoli	Men's 50 m breaststroke	28.86	27	Did not advance			
Haniel Kudwoli	Men's 100 m breaststroke	1:04.30	22	Did not advance			
Stephen Nyoike	Men's 50 m butterfly	24.91	25	Did not advance			
Stephen Nyoike	Men's 100 m butterfly	55.87	25	Did not advance			
Sara Mose	Women's 50 m freestyle	26.07	19	Did not advance			
Sara Mose	Women's 100 m freestyle	58.11	26	Did not advance			
Imara-Bella Thorpe	Women's 50 m freestyle	27.15	33	Did not advance			
Imara-Bella Thorpe	Women's 50 m butterfly	27.98	21	Did not advance			
Imara-Bella Thorpe	Women's 100 m butterfly	1:02.35	15 Q	1:02.20	15	Did not advance	
Haniel Kudwoli; Stephen Nyoike; Sara Mose; Imara-Bella Thorpe	Mixed 4 × 100 m freestyle relay	3:42.79	9	—N/a		Did not advance	
Haniel Kudwoli; Stephen Nyoike; Sara Mose; Imara-Bella Thorpe	Mixed 4 × 100 m medley relay	4:05.16	9	—N/a		Did not advance	

== Track cycling ==
Kenya selected six cyclists for the 2026 Games.

- Nancy Debe
- Monica Jelimo Kiplagat
- Kendra Masiga
- Wangai Evan Kimani
- Cornelius Kemboi
- Peterson Kamau

Sprint

Athlete	Event	Qualification		Quarterfinals	Semifinals	Final / BM	
Athlete	Event	Time	Rank	Opposition Time	Opposition Time	Opposition Time	Rank
Monica Jelimo Kiplagat	Women's individual sprint	15.623	20	Did not advance			
Kennedy Ogada pilot:Fabian Gathoni	Men's tandem sprint B	12.618	6	—N/a		Did not advance	

Individual pursuit

Athlete	Event	Qualification		Final / BM	
Athlete	Event	Time	Rank	Time	Rank
Peter Karanja	Men's individual pursuit	5:22.023	21	Did not advance	
Monica Jelimo Kiplagat	Women's individual pursuit	5:46.416	13	Did not advance	
Kendra Masiga Tabu	Women's individual pursuit	5:48.371	14	Did not advance	
Josette Umi Kiarie	Women's individual pursuit	6:17.360	15	Did not advance	
Nancy Debe; Josette Kiarie; Monica Jelimo Kiplagat; Kendra Masiga	Women's team pursuit	5:50.745	5	Did not advance	

Time trial

Athlete	Event	Time	Rank
Peter Karanja	Men's 1 km time trial	1:17.111	22
Monica Jelimo Kiplagat	Women's 1 km time trial	1:24.462	14
Kendra Masiga	Women's 1 km time trial	1:27.255	15
Josette Umi Kiarie	Women's 1 km time trial	1:31.909	16
Kennedy Ivuzu Ogada; Fabian Gathoni (pilot)	Men's tandem 1 km time trial B	1:22.052	6

== Weightlifting ==
On 18 May 2026, the IWF Commonwealth Games weightlifting ranking lists were finalised. The top eight ranked lifters, limited to one per CGA, and not including Scotland (who got automatic host spots) and the directly qualified reigning Commonwealth Weightlifting champions, gained a quota place for the games in their weight class. Kenya qualified one male and one female lifter. The country later received two additional women's quotas.

Athlete	Event	Snatch (kg)		Clean & Jerk (kg)		Total (kg)	Rank
Athlete	Event	Result	Rank	Result	Rank	Total (kg)	Rank
Joshua Amunga	Men's 60 kg	115	3	145	3	260	3rd place, bronze medalist(s)
Janet Oduor	Women's 48 kg	58	8	75	8	133	8
Rachel Achieng Enock	Women's 77 kg	90	7	NM		DNF	
Juliana Ongonga	Women's 86 kg	85	9	108	8	193	8

=== Para powerlifting ===
Kenya qualified four para powerlifters (one man and three women).

Athlete	Event	Lift (kg)	Points	Rank
Ngungi Maringa	Men's lightweight	157	127.0	8
Hellen Wawira	Women's lightweight	107	104.4	4
Rahab Ngare	Women's lightweight	73	71.0	9
Joyce Njuguna	Women's heavyweight	114	92.2	7
