= Athletics at the 2026 Commonwealth Games – Men's 3000 metres steeplechase =

Men's 3000 metres steeplechase at the 2026 Commonwealth Games
- Venue: Scotstoun Stadium, Glasgow
- Dates: 27 July 2026 (final)
- Competitors: 8 from 4 nations
- Winning time: 8:18.23

Medalists
gold medal	Edmund Serem	Kenya
silver medal	Simon Kiprop Koech	Kenya
bronze medal	Leonard Kipkemoi Bett	Kenya

The men's 3000 metres steeplechase at the 2026 Commonwealth Games, as part of the athletics programme, was held at the Scotstoun Stadium on 27 July 2026 and was a straight final.

== Records ==
Prior to this competition, the existing world and Games records were as follows:

Men's 3000 m steeplechase
World record	7:52.10	Lamecha Girma (ETH)	9 Jun 2023	Paris, France
Commonwealth record	7:53.60	Brimin Kipruto (KEN)	22 Jul 2011	Monaco
Games record	8:10.10	Conseslus Kipruto (KEN)	13 Apr 2018	Gold Coast, Australia

== Schedule ==
The schedule is as follows:

Date	Time	Round
27 July 2026	20:50	Final

All times are United Kingdom time (UTC+1)

== Results ==
=== Final ===
The straight final of the men's 3000 metres steeplechase was held on the evening of 27 July 2026.

Place	Athlete	Nation	Time	Notes
1st place, gold medalist(s)	Edmund Serem	Kenya	8:18.23	
2nd place, silver medalist(s)	Simon Koech	Kenya	8:18.59	
3rd place, bronze medalist(s)	Leonard Bett	Kenya	8:21.63	
4	Geordie Beamish	New Zealand	8:24.09	
5	Jean-Simon Desgagnés	Canada	8:25.43	
6	Aaron Ahl	Canada	8:31.71	
7	Kristian Imroth	England	8:38.12	
8	Mark Pearce	England	8:42.39	
