= Jamaica at the 2026 Commonwealth Games =

- Flag of Jamaica
- CG code: JAM
- CGA: Jamaica Olympic Association
- Website: joa.org.jm

in Glasgow, Scotland 23 July 2026 – 2 August 2026
- Competitors: 76 in 10 sports
- Flag bearer: Collin McKenzie
- Baton bearer: Shamera Sterling-Humphrey
- Medals Ranked 8th: Gold 10 Silver 4 Bronze 5 Total 19

Commonwealth Games appearances (overview)
- 1934; 1938–1950; 1954; 1958; 1962; 1966; 1970; 1974; 1978; 1982; 1986; 1990; 1994; 1998; 2002; 2006; 2010; 2014; 2018; 2022; 2026; 2030

Jamaica competed at the 2026 Commonwealth Games in Glasgow, Scotland. This marked Jamaica's 19th appearance at the Commonwealth Games after making its debut in 1934.

The King's Baton relay stopped in Jamaica in May 2025.

The Jamaican delegation consisted of 76 athletes competing in all ten sports, with 44 selected for athletics..

Swimmer Collin McKenzie was the country's flagbearer during the opening ceremony. Meanwhile, netballer Shamera Sterling-Humphrey was the baton bearer during the opening ceremony.

Jamaican athletes won a total of 19 medals, including ten gold, to place eighth on the medal table. This meant Jamaica was the top placing team from the Caribbean.

== Competitors ==
The following is the list of number of competitors participating at the Games per sport/discipline.

Sport		Men	Women	Total
3x3 basketball		4	4	8
Artistic gymnastics		1	1	2
Athletics	Athletics	21	22	43
Athletics	Para-athletics	1	0	1
Bowls		1	0	1
Boxing		1	0	1
Judo		1	1	2
Netball		—N/a	12	12
Swimming		2	2	4
Track cycling		0	1	1
Weightlifting		0	1	1
Total		32	44	76

== Medalists ==
The following Jamaican competitors won medals at the games. In the by discipline sections below, medallists' names are bolded.

Medal	Name	Sport	Event	Date	Ref.
Gold	Romaine Beckford	Athletics	Men's high jump	27 July	
Gold	Demario Prince	Athletics	Men's 110 metres hurdles	27 July	
Gold	Tajay Gayle	Athletics	Men's long jump	29 July	
Gold	Samantha Hall	Athletics	Women's discus throw	30 July	
Gold	Sanique Walker	Athletics	Women's 400 m hurdles	31 July	
Gold	Navasky Anderson	Athletics	Men's 800 metres	1 August	
Gold	Jordan Scott	Athletics	Men's triple jump	1 August	
Gold	Dejanea Oakley	Athletics	Women's 400 metres	1 August	
Gold	Alana Reid; Jodean Williams; Lavanya Williams; Ashanti Moore	Athletics	Women's 4 × 100 metres relay	1 August	
Gold	Zandrion Barnes; Leah Anderson; Delano Kennedy; Dejanea Oakley; Shana Kaye Anderson; Christopher Taylor	Athletics	Mixed 4 × 400 metres relay	1 August	
Silver	Ackelia Smith	Athletics	Women's triple jump	30 July	
Silver	Megan Simmonds	Athletics	Women's 100 metres hurdles	30 July	
Silver	Fedrick Dacres	Athletics	Men's discus throw	1 August	
Silver	Jamaica national netball team Romelda Aiken; Shanice Beckford; Kadie-Ann Dehaney; Rhea Dixon; Nicole Dixon-Rochester; Brie Grierson; Crystal Plummer; Shamera Sterling-Humphrey; Abigale Sutherland; Jodi-Ann Ward; Azara Wilmot; Latanya Wilson	Netball	Women's tournament	2 August	
Bronze	Lloydricia Cameron	Athletics	Women's shot put	29 July	
Bronze	Shantae Foreman	Athletics	Women's triple jump	30 July	
Bronze	Assinie Wilson	Athletics	Men's 400 m hurdles	31 July	
Bronze	Christopher Taylor	Athletics	Men's 200 metres	31 July	
Bronze	Alana Reid	Athletics	Women's 200 metres	31 July	

== 3x3 basketball ==
Jamaica qualified a men's and women's 3x3 basketball teams. This marked the country's debut in the sport at the Commonwealth Games.

Summary

Team	Event	Group stage						Play-ins	Semifinal	Final / BM / CM	
Team	Event	Opposition Score	Opposition Score	Opposition Score	Opposition Score	Opposition Score	Rank	Opposition Score	Opposition Score	Opposition Score	Rank
Jamaica men	Men's tournament	England; L 16–22	Singapore; W 22–20	Fiji; L 15–21	Kenya; L 12–22	Malaysia; L 15–21	6	Did not advance			11
Jamaica women	Women's tournament	Uganda; L 17–18 (OT)	Australia; L 13–21	Cayman Islands; W 21–5	Kenya; W 21–16	Fiji; W 17–15	3 q	England; W 21–20	Australia; L 8–21	New Zealand; L 13–18	4

=== Men's tournament ===
Roster The men's roster was named on July 17, 2026.

- Malik Lawrence-Anderson
- Nicholai Brown
- Tommy McDonald
- Lushane Wilson

Group B

Pos	Team	Pld	W	L	PF	PA	PD	Qualification
1	England	5	5	0	105	70	+35	Direct to semi-finals
2	Malaysia	5	4	1	103	82	+21	Quarter-finals
3	Singapore	5	2	3	88	86	+2	Quarter-finals
4	Kenya	5	2	3	82	82	0	
5	Fiji	5	1	4	66	97	−31	
6	Jamaica	5	1	4	77	104	−27	

Source: Glasgow 2026
Rules for classification: 1) Wins; 2) Head-to-head record; 3) Points scored.

25 July 2026
12:30

Report

England	22–16	Jamaica
Pts: Walshe 9		Pts: McDonald 7

SEC, Glasgow

25 July 2026
14:55

Report

Singapore	20–22	Jamaica
Pts: Mohamed 10		Pts: Brown 8

SEC, Glasgow

25 July 2026
20:40

Report

Fiji	21–15	Jamaica
Pts: Waqabaca 10		Pts: McDonald 6

SEC, Glasgow

27 July 2026
15:15

Report

Kenya	22–12	Jamaica
Pts: Gichohi 11		Pts: Lawrence Anderson 6

SEC, Glasgow

27 July 2026
20:45

Report

Malaysia	21–15	Jamaica
Pts: Chang 11		Pts: Lawrence Anderson 6

SEC, Glasgow

=== Women's tournament ===
Roster The Women's roster was named on July 17, 2026.

- Tiffany Reynolds
- Carissa Robinson
- Christeina Bryan
- Teneisia Brown

Group A

Pos	Team	Pld	W	L	PF	PA	PD	Qualification
1	Australia	5	5	0	105	33	+72	Direct to semi-finals
2	Uganda	5	4	1	90	58	+32	Quarter-finals
3	Jamaica	5	3	2	89	75	+14	Quarter-finals
4	Kenya	5	2	3	63	85	−22	
5	Fiji	5	1	4	56	81	−25	
6	Cayman Islands	5	0	5	29	100	−71	

Source: Glasgow 2026
Rules for classification: 1) Wins; 2) Head-to-head record; 3) Points scored.

24 July 2026
12:55

Report

Uganda	18–17 (OT)	Jamaica
Pts: Asinde 7		Pts: Brown 6

SEC, Glasgow

24 July 2026
14:30

Report

Australia	21–13	Jamaica
Pts: Atwell 8		Pts: Reynolds 8

SEC, Glasgow

24 July 2026
19:25

Report

Cayman Islands	5–21	Jamaica
Pts: O'Connor 3		Pts: Brown 8

SEC, Glasgow

26 July 2026
15:15

Report

Kenya	16–21	Jamaica
Pts: Omondi 7		Pts: Reynolds 13

SEC, Glasgow

26 July 2026
17:25

Report

Fiji	15–17	Jamaica
Pts: Kainamoli 7		Pts: Bryan 7

SEC, Glasgow

Play-in

28 July 2026
20:00

Report

England	20–21	Jamaica
Pts: Beckford-Norton 9		Pts: Reynolds 7

SEC, Glasgow

Semifinal

29 July 2026
13:30

Report

Australia	21–8	Jamaica
Pts: Atwell 13		Pts: Reynolds, Brown 3

SEC, Glasgow

Bronze medal match

29 July 2026
17:00

Report

New Zealand	18–13	Jamaica
Pts: Pupuke-Robati 8		Pts: Reynolds 7

SEC, Glasgow

== Artistic gymnastics ==
Jamaica entered two gymnasts, one per gender.

Men
Individual Qualification

Athlete	Event	Apparatus						Total	Rank
Athlete	Event	FL	PH	SR	VT	PB	HB	Total	Rank
Clayton Bell	All-around	12.450	9.850	11.650	13.300	11.700	11.100	70.050	22 Q

Individual Finals

Athlete	Event	Apparatus						Total	Rank
Athlete	Event	FX	PH	SR	VT	PB	HB	Total	Rank
Clayton Bell	All-around	12.650	9.200	10.000	13.450	7.950	11.150	64.400	17

Women
Individual Qualification

Athlete	Event	Apparatus				Total	Rank
Athlete	Event	VT	UB	BB	FL	Total	Rank
Alana Walker	All-around	—N/a	12.800	—N/a			

== Athletics ==
Jamaica released its full athletics squad on 28 June 2026. The team consisted of 44 athletes, 22 men and 22 women, including one male para athlete. Nishion Ebanks and Shericka Jackson were named to the team but did not compete.

Key

Ranks given for track events are within the athlete's heat only.

- Q = Qualified for the next round
- q = Qualified for the next round as a fastest loser or, in field events, by position without achieving the qualifying target

Men
Track events

Athlete	Event	Heat		Semifinal		Final	
Athlete	Event	Result	Rank	Result	Rank	Result	Rank
Ackeem Blake	100 m	Bye		10.06	3	Did not advance	
Rohan Watson	100 m	10.13	1 q	10.12	5	Did not advance	
Roshawn Clarke	200 m	20.56	1 q	DNF		Did not advance	
Jevaughn Powell	200 m	20.28	1 q	20.24	2 Q	20.36	5
Christopher Taylor	200 m	20.36	2 q	20.20	1 Q	20.11	3rd place, bronze medalist(s)
Zandrion Barnes	400 m	45.13	1 q	45.38	3 q	45.68	7
Delano Kennedy	400 m	45.82	2 q	46.52	5	Did not advance	
Antonio Watson	400 m	46.36	1 q	DQ		Did not advance	
Navasky Anderson	800 m	1:48.12	3 Q	1:45.38	4 q	1:45.33	1st place, gold medalist(s)
Jerome Campbell	110 m hurdles	13.33	2 Q	—N/a		13.86	6
Demario Prince	110 m hurdles	13.27	2 Q	—N/a		13.17	1st place, gold medalist(s)
Assinie Wilson	400 m hurdles	49.19	2 Q	—N/a		49.22	3rd place, bronze medalist(s)
Ackeem Blake; Jerome Campbell; Christopher Taylor; Rohan Watson	4 x 100 m relay	39.13	7 q	—N/a		39.07	6

Field events

Athlete	Event	Qualification		Final	
Athlete	Event	Distance	Rank	Distance	Rank
Tajay Gayle	Long jump	8.10	1 Q	8.15	1st place, gold medalist(s)
Jordan Turner	Long jump	7.82	6 q	7.65	9
Jordan Scott	Triple jump	16.56	1 q	16.72	1st place, gold medalist(s)
Romaine Beckford	High jump	—N/a		2.25	1st place, gold medalist(s)
Raymond Richards	High jump	—N/a		2.20	4
Fedrick Dacres	Discus throw	—N/a		65.10	2nd place, silver medalist(s)
Ralford Mullings	Discus throw	—N/a		62.85	5
Elvis Graham	Javelin throw	65.07	16	Did not advance	

Women
Track events

Athlete	Event	Heat		Semifinal		Final	
Athlete	Event	Result	Rank	Result	Rank	Result	Rank
Jonielle Smith	100 m	Bye		11.07	3 q	DNS	
Jodean Williams	100 m	Bye		11.13	3 q	11.09	5
Ashanti Moore	200 m	—N/a		22.49	2 Q	22.57	4
Alana Reid	200 m	—N/a		22.64	2 Q	22.56	3rd place, bronze medalist(s)
Lavanya Williams	200 m	22.91	1 q	22.71	2 Q	22.62	5
Leah Anderson	400 m	52.74	3 q	54.15	6	Did not advance	
Shana Kaye Anderson	400 m	52.71	2 q	52.87	4	Did not advance	
Dejanea Oakley	400 m	Bye		51.18	1 Q	50.21	1st place, gold medalist(s)
Kelly-Ann Beckford	800 m	2:01.63	3 Q	1:59.96	3 Q	2:02.77	7
Adelle Tracey	800 m	2:02.58	4 q	2:01.54	4	Did not advance	
Kerrica Hill	100 m hurdles	12.69	3 Q	—N/a		DNF	
Megan Simmonds	100 m hurdles	12.55	2 Q	—N/a		12.41	2nd place, silver medalist(s)
Shiann Salmon	400 m hurdles	55.30	1 Q	—N/a		55.54	5
Sanique Walker	400 m hurdles	54.83	1 Q	—N/a		54.00 PB	1st place, gold medalist(s)
Alana Reid; Ashanti Moore; Jodean Williams; Lavanya Williams	4 x 100 m relay	42.74	1 Q	—N/a		42.65	1st place, gold medalist(s)

Field events

Athlete	Event	Qualification		Final	
Athlete	Event	Distance	Rank	Distance	Rank
Ackelia Smith	Long jump	6.58	6 q	6.52	8
Nia Robinson	Long jump	NM		Did not advance	
Lamara Distin	High jump	—N/a		1.87	4
Nayoka Clunis	Hammer throw	64.83	8 q	NM	
Samantha Hall	Discus throw	—N/a		61.66	1st place, gold medalist(s)
Lloydricia Cameron	Shot put	—N/a		17.87	3rd place, bronze medalist(s)
Ackelia Smith	Triple jump	—N/a		14.04	2nd place, silver medalist(s)
Shantae Foreman	Triple jump	—N/a		13.96	3rd place, bronze medalist(s)

Mixed

Athlete	Event	Heat		Final	
Athlete	Event	Result	Rank	Result	Rank
Zandrion Barnes; Leah Anderson; Delano Kennedy; Dejanea Oakley; Shana Kaye Anderson*; Christopher Taylor*	Mixed 4 x 400 m relay	3:17.36	3 Q	3:10.97	1st place, gold medalist(s)

- Athletes with stars ran in the heat only.

=== Para athletics ===
Athlete	Event	Final	
Athlete	Event	Result	Rank
Jahmarley Richards	Men's 100 m (T47)	11.55	7

== Bowls ==
Jamaica entered one male bowler.

Athlete	Event	Group Stage							Semifinal	Final / BM
Athlete	Event	Opposition Score	Opposition Score	Opposition Score	Opposition Score	Opposition Score	Rank	Opposition Score	Opposition Score	Rank
Robert Simpson	Men's singles	Banks (SCO); L 0–2	Prasad (FIJ); L 0–2	Owen (WAL); L 0–2	Tolchard (ENG); L 0–2	Qureshi (PAK); L 0–2	6	Did not advance		

== Boxing ==
Jamaica entered one male boxer.

Athlete	Event	Round of 32	Round of 16	Quarterfinals	Semifinals	Final	
Athlete	Event	Opposition Result	Opposition Result	Opposition Result	Opposition Result	Opposition Result	Rank
Martez Cope	Men's 65 kg	Bye	Khoahli (LES); L 0–5	Did not advance			

== Judo ==
Jamaica entered two judoka, one of each gender.

Athlete	Event	Round of 16	Quarterfinals	Semifinals	Repechage	Final/BM	
Athlete	Event	Opposition Result	Opposition Result	Opposition Result	Opposition Result	Opposition Result	Rank
Steven Moore	Men's +100 kg	Andrews (NZL); L 000s1–101s1	Did not advance				
Lauren Semple	Women's 63 kg	Kabinda (ZAM); L 000s1–100	Did not advance				

== Netball ==
Jamaica qualified as one of the top 11 eligible teams in the World Netball Rankings as of September 1, 2025.

Summary

Team	Event	Group stage						Semifinal	Final / BM / Cl.	
Team	Event	Opposition Result	Opposition Result	Opposition Result	Opposition Result	Opposition Result	Rank	Opposition Result	Opposition Result	Rank
Jamaica national team	Women's tournament	Trinidad and Tobago; W 81–22	New Zealand; L 48–53	Uganda; W 55–49	Scotland; W 45–43	Wales; W 74–28	2 Q	Australia; W 46–45	New Zealand; L 48–56	2nd place, silver medalist(s)

Roster The roster consisted of 12 athletes.

- Shamera Sterling-Humphrey (c)
- Romelda Aiken
- Shanice Beckford (vc)
- Kadie-Ann Dehaney
- Rhea Dixon
- Nicole Dixon-Rochester
- Brie Grierson
- Crystal Plummer
- Abigale Sutherland
- Jodi-Ann Ward
- Azara Wilmot
- Latanya Wilson (vc)

Group stage

Pos	Team	Pld	W	D	L	GF	GA	GD	Pts	Qualification
1	New Zealand	5	5	0	0	333	202	+131	10	Semi-finals
2	Jamaica	5	4	0	1	303	195	+108	8	Semi-finals
3	Uganda	5	3	0	2	303	255	+48	6	Classification matches
4	Scotland	5	2	0	3	276	258	+18	4	Classification matches
5	Wales	5	1	0	4	236	284	−48	2	Classification matches
6	Trinidad and Tobago	5	0	0	5	138	395	−257	0	Classification matches

Source: Glasgow 2026

25 July 2026; 19:00	Report	Jamaica	81–22	Trinidad and Tobago	OVO Hydro; Umpires: Louise Travis, Gareth Fowler; Reserve umpire: Bronwen Adams
25 July 2026; 19:00	Report	Scoring by quarter: 24–5, 19–7, 17–8, 21–2			OVO Hydro; Umpires: Louise Travis, Gareth Fowler; Reserve umpire: Bronwen Adams
25 July 2026; 19:00	Report	Azara Wilmot 33/41 (80%); Romelda Aiken-George 25/27 (93%); Shanice Beckford 16/16 (100%); Rhea Dixon 7/11 (64%)		Afeisha Noel 17/19 (89%); Joelisa Cooper 5/7 (71%)	OVO Hydro; Umpires: Louise Travis, Gareth Fowler; Reserve umpire: Bronwen Adams

26 July 2026; 21:00	Report	New Zealand	53–48	Jamaica	OVO Hydro; Umpires: Georgina Sulley-Beales, Bronwen Adams; Reserve umpire: Louise Travis
26 July 2026; 21:00	Report	Scoring by quarter: 14–12, 12–13, 13–10, 14–13			OVO Hydro; Umpires: Georgina Sulley-Beales, Bronwen Adams; Reserve umpire: Louise Travis
26 July 2026; 21:00	Report	Grace Nweke 47/56 (84%); Georgia Heffernan 6/8 (75%)		Romelda Aiken-George 34/38 (89%); Shanice Beckford 14/15 (93%)	OVO Hydro; Umpires: Georgina Sulley-Beales, Bronwen Adams; Reserve umpire: Louise Travis

27 July 2026; 19:00	Report	Uganda	49–55	Jamaica	OVO Hydro; Umpires: Gary Burgess, Justin Barnes; Reserve umpire: Kristie Simpson
27 July 2026; 19:00	Report	Scoring by quarter: 15–12, 10–17, 14–14, 10–12			OVO Hydro; Umpires: Gary Burgess, Justin Barnes; Reserve umpire: Kristie Simpson
27 July 2026; 19:00	Report	Mary Cholhok 34/37 (92%); Shadiah Nassanga 12/12 (100%); Racheal Nanyonga 3/4 (75%)		Romelda Aiken-George 39/42 (93%); Rhea Dixon 9/12 (75%); Shanice Beckford 3/4 (75%)	OVO Hydro; Umpires: Gary Burgess, Justin Barnes; Reserve umpire: Kristie Simpson

29 July 2026; 14:00	Report	Jamaica	45–43	Scotland	OVO Hydro; Umpires: Angela Armstrong-Lush, Kristie Simpson; Reserve umpire: Georgina Sulley-Beales
29 July 2026; 14:00	Report	Scoring by quarter: 15–9, 12–14, 8–12, 10−8			OVO Hydro; Umpires: Angela Armstrong-Lush, Kristie Simpson; Reserve umpire: Georgina Sulley-Beales
29 July 2026; 14:00	Report	Azara Wilmot 28/35 (80%); Shanice Beckford 15/18 (83%); Rhea Dixon 2/4 (50%)		Emma Barrie 22/27 (81%); Niamh McCall 21/26 (81%)	OVO Hydro; Umpires: Angela Armstrong-Lush, Kristie Simpson; Reserve umpire: Georgina Sulley-Beales

30 July 2026; 19:00	Report	Jamaica	74–28	Wales	OVO Hydro; Umpires: Tania Fink, Justin Barnes; Reserve umpire: Ken Metekingi
30 July 2026; 19:00	Report	Scoring by quarter: 13–11, 23–7, 16–5, 22–5			OVO Hydro; Umpires: Tania Fink, Justin Barnes; Reserve umpire: Ken Metekingi
30 July 2026; 19:00	Report	Romelda Aiken-George 26/30 (87%); Shanice Beckford 26/32 (81%); Azara Wilmot 16/19 (84%); Rhea Dixon 6/8 (75%)		Georgia Rowe 18/19 (95%); Phillipa Yarranton 6/8 (75%); Zoe Matthewman 3/3 (100%); Nansi Kuti 1/1 (100%)	OVO Hydro; Umpires: Tania Fink, Justin Barnes; Reserve umpire: Ken Metekingi

Semifinal

1 August 2026; 13:00	Report	Australia	45–46	Jamaica	OVO Hydro; Umpires: Gareth Fowler, Ken Metekingi; Reserve umpire: Kristie Simpson
1 August 2026; 13:00	Report	Scoring by quarter: 10–13, 11–10, 14–12, 10–11			OVO Hydro; Umpires: Gareth Fowler, Ken Metekingi; Reserve umpire: Kristie Simpson
1 August 2026; 13:00	Report	Kiera Austin 22/23 (96%); Cara Koenen 18/20 (90%); Sophie Garbin 4/4 (100%); Sophie Dwyer 1/3 (33%)		Romelda Aiken 29/32 (91%); Shanice Beckford 17/18 (94%)	OVO Hydro; Umpires: Gareth Fowler, Ken Metekingi; Reserve umpire: Kristie Simpson

Gold medal match

2 August 2026; 13:00	Report	Jamaica	48–56	New Zealand	OVO Hydro; Umpires: Bronwen Adams, Georgina Sulley-Beales; Reserve umpire: Justin Barnes
2 August 2026; 13:00	Report	Scoring by quarter: 13–16, 12–12, 11–13, 12–15			OVO Hydro; Umpires: Bronwen Adams, Georgina Sulley-Beales; Reserve umpire: Justin Barnes
2 August 2026; 13:00	Report	Romelda Aiken 32/36 (89%); Shanice Beckford 16/18 (89%)		Grace Nweke 48/54 (89%); Georgia Heffernan 8/9 (89%)	OVO Hydro; Umpires: Bronwen Adams, Georgina Sulley-Beales; Reserve umpire: Justin Barnes

== Swimming ==
Jamaica entered four swimmers (two men and two women).

Athlete	Event	Heat		Semifinal		Final	
Athlete	Event	Time	Rank	Time	Rank	Time	Rank
Kito Campbell	Men's 50 m breaststroke	28.11	15 Q	28.26	15	Did not advance	
Kito Campbell	Men's 100 m breaststroke	1:02.31	15 Q	1:02.02	15	Did not advance	
Colin McKenzie	Men's 50 m breaststroke	29.47	34	Did not advance			
Colin McKenzie	Men's 50 m butterfly	24.81	23	Did not advance			
Jessica Calderbank	Women's 50 m butterfly	27.17	14 Q	26.88	11	Did not advance	
Jessica Calderbank	Women's 100 m butterfly	1:01.34	14	1:01.31	14	Did not advance	
Sabrina Lyn	Women's 50 m breaststroke	31.19	5 Q	31.13	5 Q	30.95	5
Sabrina Lyn	Women's 100 m breaststroke	1:09.11	12 Q	1:08.47	8 Q	1:08.87	8
Sabrina Lyn	Women's 50 m butterfly	27.75	18 R	Did not advance			
Sabrina Lyn	Women's 100 m butterfly	1:03.19	17 R	Did not advance			

== Track cycling ==
Jamaica entered one female track cyclist.

Women
Keirin

Athlete	Event	1st Round	Repechage	Semifinals	Final
Athlete	Event	Rank	Rank	Rank	Rank
Dahlia Palmer	Women's keirin	6 R	5	Did not advance	

Sprint

Athlete	Event	Qualification		Round 1	Quarterfinals	Semifinals	Final	
Athlete	Event	Time	Rank	Opposition Result	Opposition Result	Opposition Result	Opposition Result	Rank
Dahlia Palmer	Women's sprint	12.422	19	Did not advance				

== Weightlifting ==
Jamaica received a reallocated quota for Krystal Campbell, in the women's +86 kg class.

Athlete	Event	Snatch (kg)		Clean & Jerk (kg)		Total (kg)	Rank
Athlete	Event	Result	Rank	Result	Rank	Total (kg)	Rank
Krystal Campbell	Women's +86 kg	76	11	100	11	176	10
