= Athletics at the 2026 Commonwealth Games – Men's 100 metres (T38) =

Men's 100 metres (T38) at the 2026 Commonwealth Games
- Venue: Scotstoun Stadium, Glasgow
- Dates: 27 July 2026 (final)
- Competitors: 7 from 5 nations
- Winning time: 11.11 GR

Medalists
gold medal	Thomas Young	England
silver medal	Ullrich Muller	Australia
bronze medal	Zachary Gingras	Canada

The men's 100 metres (T38) event at the 2026 Commonwealth Games, also referred to as the men's 100 metres T37/38 event, as part of the para-athletics programme, took place at the Scotstoun Stadium on 27 July 2026.

The event was open to male para-athletes in the T37 and T38 classification for ambulant para-athletes with a physical or co-ordination impairment.

== Records ==
Prior to this competition, the relevant existing world and Games records were as follows:

Records T37
World record	10.95	Nick Mayhugh (USA)	Tokyo, Japan	27 August 2021
Records T38
World record	10.64	Jaydin Blackwell (USA)	Paris, France	31 August 2024

== Qualification ==
Para athletic event qualification is regulated by a special system organised between Commonwealth Sport and the International Paralympic Committee. Each para athletic event allowed for eight quota places, or 10 in the case of throwing events. All but one quota in each event was available on the basis of the Commonwealth Para Rankings on 31 Match 2026, to a maximum of two per Commonwealth Games Association (CGA), with the remaining quota allocated by Bipartite invitation.

This list did not set a limit on entrants, as other athletes in the same classification, but qualified directly for another event, could enter the event in question, up to a maximum (combined quota, invitation and 'separate event' quota) of three per event per CGA.

== Schedule ==
The schedule was as follows:

Date	Time	Round
27 July 2026	21:27	Final

All times are United Kingdom time (UTC+1)

== Results ==
=== Final ===
The final of the men's 100 metres (T38) took place in the evening session of 27 July 2026.

Place	Lane	Class	Athlete	Nation	Time	Notes
1st place, gold medalist(s)	5	T38	Thomas Young	England	11.11	GR, SB
2nd place, silver medalist(s)	4	T38	Ullrich Muller	Australia	11.19	SB
3rd place, bronze medalist(s)	3	T38	Zachary Gingras	Canada	11.55	PB
4	6	T38	Thomas McGough	Australia	11.74	SB
5	2	T37	Rakeshbhai Bhatt	India	11.82	SB
6	8	T37	Shreyansh Trivedi	India	12.22	
7	7	T38	Alexander Thomson	Scotland	12.50	SB
					Wind: (+0.2 m/s)	
