= Athletics at the 2026 Commonwealth Games – Women's 3000 metres steeplechase =

Women's 3000 metres steeplechase at the 2026 Commonwealth Games
- Venue: Scotstoun Stadium, Glasgow
- Dates: 29 July 2026 (final)
- Competitors: 10 from 8 nations
- Winning time: 9:01.76

Medalists
gold medal	Faith Cherotich	Kenya
silver medal	Elise Thorner	England
bronze medal	Peruth Chemutai	Uganda

The women's 3000 metres steeplechaseat the 2026 Commonwealth Games, as part of the athletics programme, took place at the Scotstoun Stadium on 29 July 2026. The event was a straight final.

== Records ==
Prior to this competition, the existing world and Games records were as follows:

Women's 3000 Metres Steeplechase
World record	8:44.30	Beatrice Chepkoech (KEN)	20 Jul 2018	Stade Louis II, Monaco
Commonwealth record	8:44.30	Beatrice Chepkoech (KEN)	20 Jul 2018	Stade Louis II, Monaco
Games record	9:15.70	Jackline Chepkoech (KEN)	5 Aug 2022	Birmingham, England

== Schedule ==
The schedule was as follows:

Date	Time	Round
29 July 2026	18:30	Final

All times are United Kingdom time (UTC+1)

== Results ==
=== Final ===
The straight final of the 3000 metres steeplechase was scheduled for the evening of 29 July 2026.

Place	Athlete	Nation	Time	Notes
1st place, gold medalist(s)	Faith Cherotich	Kenya	9:01.76	GR
2nd place, silver medalist(s)	Elise Thorner	England	9:05.45	PB
3rd place, bronze medalist(s)	Peruth Chemutai	Uganda	9:09.96	
4	Cara Feain-Ryan	Australia	9:22.07	
5	Parul Chaudhary	India	9:26.75	
6	Grace Fetherstonhaugh	Canada	9:27.49	PB
7	Celestine Biwot	Kenya	9:33.61	
8	Cari Hughes	Wales	9:40.71	NR
9	Katelyn Stewart-Barnett	Canada	9:46.98	
10	Sarah Tait	Scotland	9:47.41	
