= Athletics at the 2026 Commonwealth Games – Men's 1500 metres (T54) =

Men's 1500 metres (T54) at the 2026 Commonwealth Games
- Venue: Scotstoun Stadium, Glasgow
- Dates: 1 August 2026 (final)
- Competitors: 8 from 7 nations
- Winning time: 3:17.65

Medalists
gold medal	Nathan Maguire	England
silver medal	Daniel Sidbury	England
bronze medal	Sam Rizzo	Australia

The Men's 1500 metres (T54) event at the 2026 Commonwealth Games, as part of the para-athletics programme, took place at the Scotstoun Stadium on 1 August 2026. The event will consist of a single final.

The event is open to male para-athletes in the T53 and T54 classifications for para-athletes with a lower limb impairment, competing in racing wheelchairs. This is a new event on the Games programme.

== Qualification ==
Para athletic event qualification is regulated by a special system organised between Commonwealth Sport and the International Paralympic Committee. Each para athletic event allowed for eight quota places, or 10 in the case of throwing events. All but one quota in each event was available on the basis of the Commonwealth Para Rankings on 31 Match 2026, to a maximum of two per Commonwealth Games Association (CGA), with the remaining quota allocated by Bipartite invitation.

This list did not set a limit on entrants, as other athletes in the same classification, but qualified directly for another event, could enter the event in question, up to a maximum (combined quota, invitation and 'separate event' quota) of three per event per CGA.

== Schedule ==
The schedule is as follows:

Date	Time	Round
1 August 2026	18:30	Final

All times are United Kingdom time (UTC+1)

== Results ==
=== Final ===
The final of the men's 1500 metres (T54) was scheduled for the evening session of 1 August 2026.

Place	Athlete	Nation	Time	Notes
1st place, gold medalist(s)	Nathan Maguire	England	3:17.65	SB
2nd place, silver medalist(s)	Danny Sidbury	England	3:18.31	SB
3rd place, bronze medalist(s)	Sam Rizzo	Australia	3:18.61	SB
4	Sean Frame	Scotland	3:20.49	SB
5	Cedric Ravet	Mauritius	3:20.96	SB
6	Sam Carter	Australia	3:21.49	SB
7	Ramesh Shanmugam	India	3:23.59	SB
8	Raphael Botsyo Nkegbe	Ghana	3:48.41	SB
