= Boxing at the 2026 Commonwealth Games – Men's +90 kg =

Boxing competitions

Boxing – Men's +90 kg at the 2026 Commonwealth Games
- Venue: SEC Centre
- Dates: 29 July – 1 August 2026
- Competitors: 8 from 8 nations

Medalists
| gold medal | Damar Thomas | England |
| silver medal | Narender Berwal | India |
| bronze medal | Willie John McCartan | Northern Ireland |
| bronze medal | Nigel Paul | Trinidad and Tobago |

The men's +90 kg boxing competitions at the 2026 Commonwealth Games in Glasgow, Scotland took place between July 29 and August 1 at the SEC Centre.

Like all Commonwealth boxing events, the competition was a straight single-elimination tournament. Both semifinal losers were awarded bronze medals, so no boxers competed again after their first loss. Bouts consisted of three rounds of three minutes each, with one-minute breaks between rounds.

== Schedule ==
The schedule was as follows:

| Date | Round |
|---|---|
| Wednesday 29 July | Quarter-finals |
| Friday 31 July | Semi-finals |
| Saturday 1 August | Final |

== Results ==
The draw was as follows:

=== Bracket ===
Quarterfinals
29 July
Narender Berwal (IND) | 3
Michael Seko (SAM) | 2
29 July
Nigel Paul (TTO) | 5
Ramzi Salifou (TOG) | 0
29 July
Daniel Plange (GHA) | 0
William John McCartan (NIR) | 5
29 July
Aziz Abdul (UGA)
Damar Thomas (ENG) | DSQ

Semifinals
31 July
Narender Berwal (IND) | 5
Nigel Paul (TTO) | 0
31 July
William John McCartan (NIR)
Damar Thomas (ENG) | W/O

Gold medal match
1 August
Narender Berwal (IND) | 0
Damar Thomas (ENG) | 5
