= Athletics at the 2026 Commonwealth Games – Women's shot put (F57) =

Women's shot put (F57) at the 2026 Commonwealth Games
- Venue: Scotstoun Stadium
- Dates: 27 July
- Competitors: 10 from 7 nations
- Winning mark: 9.81 m

Medalists
gold medal	Sharmila Dhankar	India
silver medal	Zinabu Issah	Ghana
bronze medal	Shilpa Shyla	India

The women's shot put (F57) at the 2026 Commonwealth Games, as part of the athletics programme, will place in the Scotstoun Stadium on the evening of 27 July. The event will consist of a stand alone final.

== Schedule ==
The schedule is as follows:

Date	Time	Round
27 July 2026	20:45	Final

All times are British Summer Time (UTC+1)

== Qualification ==
Para athletic event qualification is regulated by a special system organised between Commonwealth Sport and the International Paralympic Committee. Each para athletic event allowed for eight quota places, or 10 in the case of throwing events. All but one quota in each event was available on the basis of the Commonwealth Para Rankings on 31 Match 2026, to a maximum of two per Commonwealth Games Association (CGA), with the remaining quota allocated by Bipartite invitation.

This list did not set a limit on entrants, as other athletes in the same classification, but qualified directly for another event, could enter the event in question, up to a maximum (combined quota, invitation and 'separate event' quota) of three per event per CGA.

== Entrants ==
The following Associations have entered athletes in this event. Further athletes from other associations may be added before the event commences:

- Canada (2)
- England (1).
- Ghana (1)
- India (2)
- Wales (1)

== Results ==
=== Final ===
Rank	Name	#1	#2	#3	#4	#5	#6	Result	Points	Notes
1st place, gold medalist(s)	Sharmila Dhankar (IND)	9.48	9.58	9.81	9.17	9.37	9.60	9.81		SB
2nd place, silver medalist(s)	Zinabu Issah (GHA)	8.65	8.37	8.60	7.98	8.24	8.09	8.65		SB
3rd place, bronze medalist(s)	Shilpa Shyla (IND)	6.69	6.95	7.26	6.91	7.09	x	7.26		PB
4	Christel Robichaud (CAN)	6.46	6.55	6.52	6.39	6.69	6.31	6.69		PB
5	Ellie-Mae Bowen (WAL)	6.25	6.40	6.48	6.40	6.46	6.28	6.48		PB
6	Claire Norek (CAN)	5.74	5.77	6.14	6.09	6.13	6.29	6.29		PB
7	Julie Charlton (AUS)	5.97	6.19	5.82	5.84	5.87	6.00	6.19		SB
8	Ainsley Hooker (AUS)	5.40	5.25	5.08	5.37	5.24	5.18	5.40		SB
9	Ozioma Nlewedum (ENG)	4.85	5.28	4.97	5.31	4.92	5.09	5.31		SB
10	Eucharia Iyiazi (NGR)	x	x	x	x	x	x	NM		
