= Weightlifting at the 2026 Commonwealth Games =

- Weightlifting pictogram
- Venue: SEC Armadillo
- Location: Glasgow, Scotland
- Dates: 26 to 30 July 2026
- Competitors: 169 (84 men, 85 women) from 35 nations

Weightlifting at the 2026 Commonwealth Games was the 20th appearance of Weightlifting at the Commonwealth Games. The weightlifting competition at the 2026 Commonwealth Games was held in Glasgow, Scotland. This was the twentieth edition since its inclusion in 1950, and the fourth staging within Scotland specifically..

The competition took place between 26 and 30 July 2026, spread across sixteen weight classes (eight per gender).

== Schedule ==
The competition schedule was as follows:

Date Event	Sun 26	Mon 27	Tue 28	Wed 29	Thu 30
Men's
60 kg	F				
65 kg	F				
71 kg		F			
79 kg		F			
88 kg			F		
94 kg				F	
110 kg					F
+110 kg					F
Women's
48 kg	F				
53 kg		F			
58 kg		F			
63 kg			F		
69 kg			F		
77 kg				F	
86 kg				F	
+86 kg					F

== Qualification ==
A total of 176 weightlifters (88 per gender) qualified to compete at the Games. Nations may earn one quota per weight class, allocated as follows:.

- Automatic Qualification – Host CGA (1 per event)
- Direct Qualification – 2025 Commonwealth Weightlifting Champions (1 per event)
- IWF Commonwealth Ranking List (Ranking Period: 01 June 2025 – 18 May 2026) (8 per event)
- Bipartite Invitation (1 per event)

== Medal summary ==
=== Medal table ===
* Host nation (Scotland)

Rank	CGA	Gold	Silver	Bronze	Total
1	Malaysia	5	1	1	7
2	Nigeria	3	1	0	4
3	Canada	2	2	4	8
4	India	1	6	1	8
5	England	1	4	2	7
6	New Zealand	1	1	0	2
6	Samoa	1	1	0	2
8	Australia	1	0	2	3
9	Fiji	1	0	0	1
10	Nauru	0	0	2	2
11	Kenya	0	0	1	1
11	Papua New Guinea	0	0	1	1
11	Scotland*	0	0	1	1
11	Wales	0	0	1	1
Totals (14 entries)		16	16	16	48

=== Medalists ===
==== Men's events ====
Event	Gold		Silver		Bronze	
60 kg	Aniq Kasdan; Malaysia	273 kg GR	Rishikanta Chanambam; India	264 kg	Joshua Amunga Mboya; Kenya	260 kg
65 kg	Aznil Bidin; Malaysia	299 kg GR	Muthupandi Raja; India	286 kg	Morea Baru; Papua New Guinea	282 kg
71 kg	Edidiong Umoafia; Nigeria	319 kg GR	John Tafi; Samoa	314 kg	Ezekiel Moses; Nauru	310 kg
79 kg	Muhammad Erry Hidayat; Malaysia	331 kg GR	Ajaya Babu Valluri; India	330 kg	Chris Murray; England	325 kg
88 kg	Muhammad Hafizuddin Roslin; Malaysia	345 kg GR	Cameron McTaggart; New Zealand	338 kg	Angus Doig; Scotland	309 kg
94 kg	Syahmi Nor Ghazali; Malaysia	347 kg GR	Alex Bellemarre; Canada	346 kg	Oliver Saxton; Australia	336 kg
110 kg	Taniela Rainibogi; Fiji	378 kg GR	Cyrille Tchatchet; England	374 kg	Xavier Lusignan; Canada	356 kg
+110 kg	David Liti; New Zealand	389 kg GR	Lovepreet Singh; India	388 kg	Andrew Griffiths; England	356 kg

==== Women's events ====
Event	Gold		Silver		Bronze	
48 kg	Mirabai Chanu; India	190 kg GR	Ruth Nyong; Nigeria	168 kg	Irene Jane Henry; Malaysia	167 kg
53 kg	Omolola Onome Didih; Nigeria	206 kg CR, GR	Gyaneshwari Yadav; India	199 kg	Rebekah Groulx; Canada	178 kg
58 kg	Rafiatu Folashade Lawal; Nigeria	229 kg GR	Ann-Sophie Taschereau; Canada	215 kg	Bindyarani Devi Sorokhaibam; India	199 kg
63 kg	Maude Charron; Canada	232 kg GR	Sarah Davies; England	217 kg	Femily-Crystie Notte; Nauru	216 kg
69 kg	Charlotte Simoneau; Canada	240 kg GR	Harjinder Kaur; India	227 kg	Nya Hayman; Australia	218 kg
77 kg	Seine Stowers; Samoa	237 kg GR	Isabella Brown; England	229 kg	Laura Hughes; Wales	224 kg
86 kg	Eileen Cikamatana; Australia	248 kg GR	Madias Nzesso; England	239 kg	Rose Beaudoin; Canada	230 kg
+86 kg	Emily Campbell; England	278 kg GR	Siti Binti-Draman; Malaysia	253 kg	Etta Love; Canada	250 kg

== Participating nations ==
There were 35 participating Commonwealth Games Associations (CGAs) in weightlifting with a total of 168 athletes (84 men and 85 women). The number of athletes a nation entered is in parentheses beside the name of the country.

- Australia (11)
- Barbados (1)
- Brunei (1)
- Canada (13)
- Cameroon (2)
- Cook Islands (1)
- Cyprus (2)
- England (15)
- Fiji (2)
- Ghana (4)
- Gibraltar (1)
- India (11)
- Jamaica (1)
- Jersey (1)
- Kenya (4)
- Kiribati (4)
- Malaysia (9)
- Malta (4)
- Mauritius (2)
- Nauru (6)
- New Zealand (7)
- Nigeria (8)
- Northern Ireland (4)
- Papua New Guinea (4)
- Samoa (9)
- Scotland (9)
- Singapore (6)
- Solomon Islands (1)
- South Africa (9)
- Sri Lanka (5)
- Tonga (2)
- Tuvalu (1)
- Uganda (1)
- Vanuatu (2)
- Wales (6)
