= Athletics at the 2026 Commonwealth Games – Women's 100 metres hurdles =

Women's 100 metres hurdles at the 2026 Commonwealth Games
- Venue: Scotstoun Stadium, Glasgow
- Dates: 30 July 2026 (round 1 and final)
- Winning time: 12.33

Medalists
| gold medal | Devynne Charlton | Bahamas |
| silver medal | Megan Simmonds | Jamaica |
| bronze medal | Tobi Amusan | Nigeria |

The women's 100 metres hurdles at the 2026 Commonwealth Games, as part of the athletics programme, will take place at the Scotstoun Stadium on 30 July 2026.

== Records ==
Prior to this competition, the existing world, Commonwealth and Commonwealth Games records were as follows:

Women's 100 Metres Hurdles
| World record | 12.12 | Tobi Amusan (NGR) | 24 Jul 2022 | Eugene, United States |
| Commonwealth record | 12.12 | Tobi Amusan (NGR) | 24 Jul 2022 | Eugene, United States |
| Games record | 12.30 | Tobi Amusan (NGR) | 7 Aug 2022 | Birmingham, England |

== Schedule ==
The schedule was as follows:

| Date | Time | Round |
|---|---|---|
| 30 July 2026 | 11:30 | Round 1 |
| 30 July 2026 | 21:49 | Final |

All times are United Kingdom time (UTC+1)

== Results ==
=== Round 1 ===
Round 1 was held on the morning of 30 July 2026. First 3 in each heat (Q) and the next 2 fastest (q) advanced to the final.

==== Heat 1 ====
| Place | Lane | Athlete | Nation | Time | Notes |
|---|---|---|---|---|---|
| 1 | 1 | Tobi Amusan | Nigeria | 12.19 | Q |
| 2 | 5 | Marione Fourie | South Africa | 12.50 | Q |
| 3 | 6 | Kerrica Hill | Jamaica | 12.69 | Q |
| 4 | 2 | Evonne Britton | Ghana | 12.78 | q |
| 5 | 4 | Mariam Abdul-Rashid | Canada | 12.98 | |
| 6 | 8 | Emma Nwofor | England | 13.07 | |
| 7 | 3 | Deya Erickson | British Virgin Islands | 13.29 | |
| 8 | 7 | Maya Rollins | Barbados | 13.36 | |
| | | | | Wind: (+3.8 m/s) | |

==== Heat 2 ====
| Place | Lane | Athlete | Nation | Time | Notes |
|---|---|---|---|---|---|
| 1 | 2 | Devynne Charlton | Bahamas | 12.39 | Q |
| 2 | 8 | Megan Simmonds | Jamaica | 12.55 | Q |
| 3 | 5 | Michelle Jenneke | Australia | 12.72 | Q |
| 4 | 4 | Tatiana Aholou | Canada | 12.91 | q |
| 5 | 3 | Rukia Omulisia | Kenya | 13.10 | |
| 6 | 7 | Cecilia Francisco Guambe | Mozambique | 13.65 | |
| 7 | 6 | Adrine Monagi | Papua New Guinea | 14.62 | |
| — | 1 | Adeyah Brewster | Barbados | DNF | |
| | | | | Wind: (+4.3 m/s) | |

=== Final ===
The final took place in the evening of 30 July 2026.

| Place | Lane | Athlete | Nation | Time | Notes |
|---|---|---|---|---|---|
| 1st place, gold medalist(s) | 6 | Devynne Charlton | Bahamas | 12.33 | |
| 2nd place, silver medalist(s) | 5 | Megan Simmonds | Jamaica | 12.41 | |
| 3rd place, bronze medalist(s) | 4 | Tobi Amusan | Nigeria | 12.60 | |
| 4 | 3 | Marione Fourie | South Africa | 12.66 | |
| 5 | 2 | Michelle Jenneke | Australia | 12.84 | |
| 6 | 1 | Tatiana Aholou | Canada | 12.86 | |
| 7 | 8 | Evonne Britton | Ghana | 13.04 | |
| — | 7 | Kerrica Hill | Jamaica | DNF | |
| | | | | Wind: (+2.5 m/s) | |
