= Athletics at the 2026 Commonwealth Games – Men's 10,000 metres =

Men's 10,000 metres at the 2026 Commonwealth Games
- Venue: Scotstoun Stadium, Glasgow
- Dates: 28 July 2026 (final)
- Competitors: 15 from 10 nations
- Winning time: 27:48.93

Medalists
gold medal	Ky Robinson	Australia
silver medal	Gulveer Singh	India
bronze medal	David Mullarkey	Isle of Man

The men's 10,000 metres at the 2026 Commonwealth Games, as part of the athletics programme, took place at the Scotstoun Stadium on 28 July 2026. The event was a straight final.

== Records ==
Prior to this competition, the existing world and Games records were as follows:

Men's 10,000 m
World record	26:11.00	Joshua Cheptegei (UGA)	7 Oct 2020	Valencia, Spain
Commonwealth record	26:11.00	Joshua Cheptegei (UGA)	7 Oct 2020	Valencia, Spain
Games record	27:09.19	Jacob Kiplimo (UGA)	2 Aug 2022	Birmingham, England

== Schedule ==
The schedule is as follows:

Date	Time	Round
28 July 2026	18:30	Final

All times are United Kingdom time (UTC+1)

== Results ==
=== Final ===
The straight final of the 10,000 metres was scheduled for the evening of 28 July 2026.

Place	Athlete	Nation	Time	Notes
1st place, gold medalist(s)	Ky Robinson	Australia	27:48.93	
2nd place, silver medalist(s)	Gulveer Singh	India	27:49.78	
3rd place, bronze medalist(s)	David Mullarkey	Isle of Man	27:50.28	
4	Edwin Kurgat	Kenya	27:50.98	SB
5	Scott Beattie	England	27:54.50	
6	Daniel Ebenyo	Kenya	27:56.35	PB
7	Samuel Simba Cherop	Uganda	27:56.68	PB
8	Benjamin Ratsim	Tanzania	27:59.70	PB
9	Kamohelo Mofolo	Lesotho	28:01.00	NR
10	Ishmael Kipkurui	Kenya	28:04.66	SB
11	Dan Kibet	Uganda	28:05.84	SB
12	Oscar Chelimo	Uganda	28:10.49	PB
13	Andrew Butchart	Scotland	28:16.75	SB
14	Ollie Lockley	Isle of Man	29:12.91	PB
15	Iven Moise	Seychelles	31:02.31	SB
