= Sharmila Dhankar =

Indian Paralympic athlete (born 1986)

Sharmila Dhankhar
Personal information
- Nationality: Indian
- Born: 15 August 1986 (age 40) Chhithroli, Mahendragarh district, Haryana, India

Sport
- Sport: Para-athletics
- Disability class: F57
- Event: shot put
Medal record
Women's para-athletics
Representing India
Commonwealth Games
Gold medal – first place	2026 Glasgow	Shot put F57

Sharmila Dhankhar (born 15 August 1986) is an Indian para-athlete specialising in shot put. She won the gold medal in the women's shot put F57 at the 2026 Commonwealth Games.

== Early and personal life ==
Sharmila Dhankar was born on 15 August 1986 in Chhithroli in Mahendragarh district of Haryana. She contracted polio at two years old, which affected one of her legs.

Dhankar was married at the age of 19 to laxman rathee of Ghurakawas district rewari and suffered domestic abuse during her first marriage. She later returned to her parent's home with her two daughters. She later remarried, and took up para-athletics after encouragement from her husband Ajit Saini. She trained in shot put and discus throw under coach Tek Chand at Rewari.

== Career ==
Dhankar competes in the F57 disability classification. She represented India at the 2022 Commonwealth Games in Birmingham. She registered a personal best and national record throw of 8.43 m (27.7 ft) in her third attempt and finished fourth in the women's shot put F57 event. In the 2025 World Para Athletics Championships held in New Delhi, she finished fifth in the women's shot put F57 with a best throw of 10.03 m (32.9 ft). At the 2026 Fazza International Para Athletics Championships in Dubai, she won gold in women's shot put F57 and bronze in women's discus throw F57.

Dhankar was part of the Indian contingent at the 2026 Commonwealth Games in Glasgow. In the women's shot put F57 event, she won the gold medal with a season-best throw of 9.81 m (32.2 ft). She became India's first-ever gold medalist in para-athletics at the Commonwealth Games.
