= Ullrich Muller =

Australian Paralympic athlete (born 2006)

Personal information
- Nationality: Australian
- Born: 19 June 2006 (age 20)

Sport
- Sport: Para-athletics
- Disability class: T38
- Events: 100 metres, 400 metres
- Coached by: Stacey Tarima
Medal record
Men's para-athletics
Representing Australia
Commonwealth Games
| Silver medal – second place | 2026 Glasgow | 100 m T38 |

Ullrich Muller (born 19 June 2006) is an Australian T38 Paralympic sprint runner.

== Career ==
Muller made his international debut at the 2025 World Para Athletics Championships.

In May 2026, he competed at the 2026 Oceania Para Athletics Championships. In July 2026, he competed at the 2026 Commonwealth Games and won a silver medal in the 100 metres T38 event.

== Personal life ==
In 2013, at six years old, Muller suffered a ruptured brain aneurysm caused by an Arteriovenous malformation (AVM). He underwent four brain surgeries and had to relearn how to walk, talk, and swallow. In late 2022, recurring headaches revealed that the AVM had regrown. He suffers from right-sided weakness and ataxia.
