= Willie John McCartan =

Northern Irish boxer

Personal information
- Nationality: Northern Ireland

Boxing career
Medal record
Men's amateur boxing
Representing Northern Ireland
Commonwealth Games
Bronze medal – third place	2026 Glasgow	+90 kg

William John McCartan is a Northern Irish boxer. He competed at the 2026 Commonwealth Games, winning the bronze medal in the men's +90 kg event.
