= Celestine Biwot =

Kenyan long-distance runner

Personal information
- Full name: Celestine Jepkosgei Biwot
- Nationality: Kenya
- Born: 24 December 2003 (age 22)

Sport
- Sport: Athletics
- Events: Steeplechase, Cross country running

Achievements and titles
- Personal best: 3000m s'chase 9:17.06 (2023)

Celestine Jepkosgei Biwot (born 24 December 2003) is a Kenyan steeplechaser. She won the Kenyan Athletics Championships in 2025 in the 3000 metres steeplechase.

== Biography ==
She was educated in Nandi County, Kenya, where she took part in athletics, but almost gave up the sport in 2022 after finishing school as she was not sure there was a pathway forward for her.

She joined the Kenya Defence Force, and after an absence from racing returned to place third at The Great Chepsaita Cross Country, part of the World Athletics Cross Country Tour, before winning the women's 3000m steeplechase the Betika Athletics Kenya Track and Field Weekend Meeting in Thika.

She won the Kenyan Defence Force Championships and then the Kenyan Athletics Championships in the 3000 metres steeplechase, with both events in Nairobi, in June 2025. She was runner-up to Winfred Yavi in the 3000 metre steeplechase at the KBC Night of Athletics in Heusden-Zolder, Belgium, in July 2025.

She placed fourth in the mile steeplechase at the 2025 Memorial Van Damme in Brussels, in August 2025, her first time competing at a Diamond League event. She placed fourth Kenyan in the 3000 metres steeplechase at the Kenyan Trials for the upcoming World Championships and was named as a reserve, but was drafted into the Kenyan team to compete at the 2025 World Athletics Championships in Tokyo, Japan, after her compatriot Faith Cherotich won the 2025 Diamond League final in Zürich, and was therefore awarded a wildcard place into the event. In Tokyo, she ran 9:22.55 but did not qualify for the final of the 3000 metres steeplechase.

Biwot placed fourth at the Cross Internacional de Itálica in Spain, in November 2025, a World Athletics Cross Country Tour Gold race.

In June 2026, she won the 3000 m steeplechase title at the Kenyan Championships in 9:26.12. She placed seventh in the 3000 m steeplechase at the 2026 Commonwealth Games in Glasgow.
