= Zinabu Issah =

Ghanaian Paralympic athlete (born 1980)

Personal information
- Nationality: Ghanaian
- Born: 6 March 1980 (age 46)

Sport
- Sport: Para-athletics
- Disability class: F57
- Events: shot put discus throw
Medal record
Women's para-athletics
Representing Ghana
Commonwealth Games
Silver medal – second place	2026 Glasgow	Shot put F57

Zinabu Issah (born 6 March 1980) is a Ghanaian para-athlete specializing in throwing events. She represented Ghana at the 2024 Summer Paralympics.

== Career ==
In June 2024, Issah qualified to represent Ghana at the 2024 Summer Paralympics. During the Opening Ceremony she was the flag bearer for Ghana together with another athlete. She competed in both the shot put and discus throw events.

In July 2026, she competed at the 2026 Commonwealth Games and won a silver medal in the shot put F57 event with a season-best throw of 8.65 metres. This was Ghana's first medal of the 2026 Commonwealth Games.
