= Yashas Palaksha =

Indian athlete

Personal information
- Born: 8 December 2001 (age 24)
- Height: 1.70 m (5 ft 7 in) (2022)

Sport
- Sport: Track and field
- Event: 400 m hurdles

Yashas Palaksha (born 8 December 2001) is an Indian athlete. He competes in 400m hurdles event. He is named in the Indian athletics team for the 400m hurdles event for the 2022 Asian Games at Hangzhou, China. Two Indian qualified for the finals, Yashas Palaksha and Santhosh Kumar and they finished fifth and sixth respectively. In the heats, Palaksha clocked 49.61s to take second place.

Palaksha who qualified for the final in the 400m hurdles at the Asian Athletic Championships in July 2023 did not take part in the finals. In May 2023, he bagged first place in the 400m hurdles in the 26th National Federation Cup Senior Athletics Championships at Birsa Munda Foot Ball Stadium, Ranchi. A month later, he won the 400m hurdles again in June 2023 at the Indian Championships at Kalinga Stadium, Bhubaneshwar. He set a new personal best of 49.22 sec winning a silver medal at Taiwan Athletics Open 2025.
