= Weightlifting at the 2026 Commonwealth Games – Qualification =

There was a total of 176 quota places available for weightlifting at the 2026 Commonwealth Games; 88 each for men and women. The following summarizes the qualified athletes per event.

== Qualification system ==
A total of 176 weightlifters (88 per gender) qualify to compete at the Games. Nations may earn one quota per weight class, allocated as follows:

- Automatic Qualification – Host CGA (1 per event)
- Direct Qualification – 2025 Commonwealth Weightlifting Champions (1 per event)
- IWF Commonwealth Ranking List (Ranking Period: 01 June 2025 – 18 May 2026) (8 per event)
- Bipartite Invitation (1 per event)

== Timeline ==
| Event | Dates | Location |
|---|---|---|
| 2025 Commonwealth Weightlifting Championships | 24–30 August 2025 | Ahmedabad, India |
| IWF Commonwealth Ranking List | 1 June 2025 – 18 May 2026 | Various locations |

== Summary ==
| CGA | Men | | | | | | | | Women | | | | | | | | Total |
| CGA | 60 | 65 | 71 | 79 | 88 | 94 | 110 | +110 | 48 | 53 | 58 | 63 | 69 | 77 | 86 | +86 | Total |
|---|---|---|---|---|---|---|---|---|---|---|---|---|---|---|---|---|---|
| Australia | | | | Yes | Yes | Yes | Yes | Yes | Yes | Yes | Yes | Yes | Yes | Yes | Yes | | 12 |
| Barbados | | | | | | Yes | | | | | | | | | | | 1 |
| Brunei | | Yes | | | | | | | | | | | | | | | 1 |
| Cameroon | | | | | | Yes | Yes | | | | | | | | | | 2 |
| Canada | Yes | | Yes | Yes | Yes | Yes | Yes | | | Yes | Yes | Yes | Yes | Yes | Yes | Yes | 13 |
| Cook Islands | | | | | | | | | | | | | | | | Yes | 1 |
| Cyprus | | Yes | | | | | | | | | Yes | | | | | | 2 |
| England | Yes | | Yes | Yes | Yes | Yes | Yes | Yes | Yes | Yes | Yes | Yes | Yes | Yes | Yes | Yes | 15 |
| Fiji | | Yes | | | | | Yes | | | | | | | | | | 2 |
| Ghana | | | | | | Yes | | | | | | | | | | | 1 |
| India | Yes | Yes | | Yes | Yes | Yes | Yes | Yes | Yes | Yes | Yes | Yes | Yes | Yes | Yes | Yes | 15 |
| Jersey | | | | | | | Yes | | | | | | | | | | 1 |
| Kenya | Yes | | | | | | | | | | | | | Yes | | | 2 |
| Kiribati | Yes | | | Yes | | | | | | | | | | | | | 2 |
| Malaysia | Yes | Yes | | Yes | Yes | Yes | | Yes | Yes | | | Yes | | | | Yes | 9 |
| Malta | | | | | | | | | | Yes | | Yes | Yes | | | | 3 |
| Mauritius | | | | | Yes | | | | | | | | Yes | | | | 2 |
| Nauru | Yes | | Yes | | | | | | Yes | | | Yes | | | | | 4 |
| New Zealand | | | | Yes | Yes | | | Yes | | | Yes | Yes | | Yes | Yes | Yes | 7 |
| Nigeria | | Yes | Yes | Yes | | | | | Yes | Yes | Yes | Yes | Yes | Yes | Yes | | 10 |
| Northern Ireland | | | Yes | | | | | Yes | | | | | Yes | Yes | | | 4 |
| Papua New Guinea | | Yes | | | | | | | Yes | Yes | | | | | | | 3 |
| Samoa | | Yes | Yes | | | Yes | Yes | Yes | | | | | | | Yes | Yes | 7 |
| Scotland | | | Yes | Yes | Yes | Yes | Yes | | Yes | | | Yes | Yes | Yes | | | 9 |
| Singapore | | | | Yes | Yes | | | | | | | | | | | Yes | 3 |
| Solomon Islands | | | | | | | | | | Yes | | | | | | | 1 |
| South Africa | | Yes | | | Yes | Yes | | | | Yes | Yes | | Yes | | | | 6 |
| Sri Lanka | Yes | Yes | Yes | | | | | | Yes | | | | | | Yes | | 5 |
| Tonga | | | | | | | | Yes | | | | | | | | | 1 |
| Tuvalu | | | | | | | | | | | | | | | | Yes | 1 |
| Uganda | Yes | | | | | | | | | | | | | | | | 1 |
| Vanuatu | | | | | | | Yes | | | | | | | | Yes | | 2 |
| Wales | | | Yes | | | | | Yes | Yes | | Yes | | Yes | Yes | | | 6 |
| TOTAL: 33 CGAs | 11 | 11 | 11 | 11 | 11 | 11 | 11 | 11 | 11 | 11 | 11 | 11 | 11 | 11 | 11 | 11 | 176 |

== Men's events ==
=== 60 kg ===
| Means of qualification | Quotas | Qualified |
|---|---|---|
| Host Nation | ~~1~~ 0* | ~~TBD (SCO)~~ |
| 2025 Commonwealth Championships | 1 | Rishikanta Singh (IND) |
| IWF Commonwealth Rankings | ~~8~~ 9 | Aniq Kasdan (MAS); Supun Dilhara Somathilaka (SRI); Antonin Lanoue (CAN); Joshua Amunga (KEN); Johannes Adam (NRU); Davis Niyoyita (UGA); Reinataake Takenteiti (KIR); Kieran Stiles (ENG); Hafiz Bin Zaidi (SGP) |
| Bipartite Invitation | 1 | Kevau Baru (PNG) |
| TOTAL | 11 | |

* Hosts Scotland declined their automatic entry in this weight class.

=== 65 kg ===
| Means of qualification | Quotas | Qualified |
|---|---|---|
| Host Nation | ~~1~~ 0 | ~~TBD (SCO)~~ |
| 2025 Commonwealth Championships | 1 | Aznil Bidin (MAS) |
| IWF Commonwealth Rankings | ~~8~~ 9 | Muthupandi Raja (IND); Morea Baru (PNG); Dimitris Minasidis (CYP); Favour Omovigho Agboro (NGR); Sandu Duthshan Jayawardhana (SRI); Nashrul Abu Bakarr (BRU); Falevaa Tafi (SAM); Zach Snyman (RSA); Kaimauri Erati (KIR) |
| Bipartite Invitation | 1 | Apakuki Wakanibua (FIJ) |
| TOTAL | 11 | |

Hosts Scotland declined their automatic entry in this weight class.

=== 71 kg ===
| Means of qualification | Quotas | Qualified |
|---|---|---|
| Host Nation | 1 | Corey Duncan (SCO) |
| 2025 Commonwealth Championships | ~~1~~ 0* | ~~Ajith Narayana (IND)~~ |
| IWF Commonwealth Rankings | ~~8~~ 9 | Edidiong Umoafia (NGR); John Tafi (SAM); Ezekiel Moses (NRU); Harrison McGrogan (NIR); Jonathan Chin (ENG); ~~Poama Qaqa (FIJ)~~; Matt Darsigny (CAN); ~~Michael Farmer (WAL)~~; Indika Dissanayake (SRI); Kester Loy (SGP) |
| Bipartite Invitation | 1 | Emmanuel Boateng (GHA) |
| TOTAL | 11 | |

*Indian weightlifter Ajith Narayana tested positive for banned substances and therefore was banned from competing. Narayana's quota spot was reallocated to the next best athlete in the rankings, Indika Dissanayake of Sri Lanka.

=== 79 kg ===
| Means of qualification | Quotas | Qualified |
|---|---|---|
| Host Nation | 1 | Iain Wilson (SCO) |
| 2025 Commonwealth Championships | 1 | Ajaya Babu (IND) |
| IWF Commonwealth Rankings | 8 | Muhammad Erry Hidayat (MAS); Shad Darsigny (CAN); Adedapo Adeleke Opadeji (NGR); Loh Yuan Yee (SGP); Rory Scott (AUS); Chris Murray (ENG); Marco Mollo (NZL); Ruben Katoatau (KIR) |
| Bipartite Invitation | 1 | Jon-Antohein Philllips (RSA) |
| TOTAL | 11 | |

=== 88 kg ===
| Means of qualification | Quotas | Qualified |
|---|---|---|
| Host Nation | 1 | Angus Doig (SCO) |
| 2025 Commonwealth Championships | 1 | Braydon Kennedy (CAN) |
| IWF Commonwealth Rankings | 8 | ~~Sairaj Pardeshi (IND)~~; Muhammad Hafizuddin Roslin (MAS); Cameron McTaggart (NZL); William James Swart (RSA); Ryven Ewing (AUS); Lim Kang Yin (SGP); Christopher Russ (ENG); Dinesh Pandoo (MRI); Rylee Borg (MLT) |
| Bipartite Invitation | 1 | Marcincy Cook (NRU) |
| TOTAL | 11 | |

=== 94 kg ===
| Means of qualification | Quotas | Qualified |
|---|---|---|
| Host Nation | 1 | Tom Wright (SCO) |
| 2025 Commonwealth Championships | 1 | Mohamad Syahmi (MAS) |
| IWF Commonwealth Rankings | 8 | Alex Bellemarre (CAN); Oliver Saxton (AUS); Dilbag Singh (IND); Forrester Osei (GHA); Daniel Onana Tanga (CMR); Joshua Hutton (ENG); Nicolaas du Plooy (RSA); Emmanuel Ulimasao (SAM) |
| Bipartite Invitation | 1 | Daniel Griffith (BAR) |
| TOTAL | 11 | |

=== 110 kg ===
| Means of qualification | Quotas | Qualified |
|---|---|---|
| Host Nation | 1 | Drew Burns (SCO) |
| 2025 Commonwealth Championships | 1 | Taniela Rainibogi (FIJ) |
| IWF Commonwealth Rankings | 6 | Xavier Lusignan (CAN); Jack Opeloge (SAM); Junior Nyabeyeu (CMR); Cyrille Tchatchet (ENG); Ridge Barredo (AUS); Thomas Wilbur (VAN) |
| Bipartite Invitation | 1 | Oliver Dodds (JEY) |
| Reallocation | 2 | Abdul Salim Adjei (GHA); Joshua Uikilifi (TGA) |
| TOTAL | 11 | |

=== +110 kg ===
| Means of qualification | Quotas | Qualified |
|---|---|---|
| Host Nation | ~~1~~ 0 | ~~TBD (SCO)~~ |
| 2025 Commonwealth Championships | 1 | Sanele Mao (SAM) |
| IWF Commonwealth Rankings | ~~8~~ 9 | David Liti (NZL); Lovepreet Singh (IND); ~~Suamili Nanai (AUS)~~; Andrew Griffiths (ENG); James Wales (WAL); Sikoti Manumua Jr (TGA); Mohd Farris Haikal Kamarul (MAS); Omar Keshta (NIR) |
| Bipartite Invitation | 1 | Christoffel Reeders (RSA) |
| TOTAL | 9 | |

Hosts Scotland declined their automatic entry in this weight class.

== Women's events ==
=== 48 kg ===
| Means of qualification | Quotas | Qualified |
|---|---|---|
| Host Nation | 1 | Alex Mackay (SCO) |
| 2025 Commonwealth Championships | 1 | Mirabai Chanu (IND) |
| IWF Commonwealth Rankings | 8 | Ruth Asouquo (NGR); Irene Jane Henry (MAS); Upamalika Jambulliye Gamladdalage (SRI); Tammy Wong (ENG); Jo-Beth Deireragea (NRU); Chloe Perkins (AUS); Nikole Roberts (WAL); Thelma Toua (PNG) |
| Bipartite Invitation | 1 | Janet Oduor (KEN) |
| TOTAL | 11 | |

=== 53 kg ===
| Means of qualification | Quotas | Qualified |
|---|---|---|
| Host Nation | ~~1~~ 0 | ~~TBD (SCO)~~ |
| 2025 Commonwealth Championships | 1 | Omolola Onome Didih (NGR) |
| IWF Commonwealth Rankings | ~~8~~ 9 | Gyaneshwari Yadav (IND); Taljaard Johanni (RSA); Brenna Kean (AUS); Noorin Gulam (ENG); Jenly Tegu Wini (SOL); Rebekah Groulx (CAN); Kim Camilleri Laganà (MLT); Dika Toua (PNG); ~~Madaline Connolly (WAL)~~ |
| Bipartite Invitation | 1 | Chua Jinn Linn (SGP) |
| TOTAL | 10 | |

Hosts Scotland declined their automatic entry in this weight class.

=== 58 kg ===
| Means of qualification | Quotas | Qualified |
|---|---|---|
| Host Nation | ~~1~~ 0 | ~~TBD (SCO)~~ |
| 2025 Commonwealth Championships | ~~1~~ | ~~Kiana Elliott (AUS)~~ |
| IWF Commonwealth Rankings | ~~8~~ ~~9~~ 10 | Rafiatu Folashade Lawal (NGR); Ann-Sophie Taschereau (CAN); Bindyarani Devi Sorokhaibam (IND); Eliza Pratt (ENG); Catrin Haf Jones (WAL); Ashley Kolomoisky (AUS); Anneke Spies Burger (RSA); ~~Elizabeth Granger (NZL)~~; Dimitra Ioannou (CYP); Anoni Taulua (SAM) |
| Bipartite Invitation | 1 | Yayra Akos Agozi (GHA) |
| Reallocation | 1 | Margaret Bless Harris (NRU) |
| TOTAL | 11 | |

Hosts Scotland declined their automatic entry in this weight class.

=== 63 kg ===
| Means of qualification | Quotas | Qualified |
|---|---|---|
| Host Nation | 1 | Beth Ashbee (SCO) |
| 2025 Commonwealth Championships | 1 | Maude Charron (CAN) |
| IWF Commonwealth Rankings | ~~8~~7 | Femily-Crystie Notte (NRU); Sarah Davies (ENG); Nirupama Devi Seram (IND); Kiana Elliott (AUS); Ruth Imoleayo Ayodele (NGR); Roberta Tabone (MLT); Nur Syazwani Binti Radzi (MAS); ~~Sienna Fesolai (NZL)~~ |
| Bipartite Invitation | 1 | Hannah Crymble (NIR) |
| Reallocation | 1 | Charlotte Whalley (WAL) |
| TOTAL | 11 | |

=== 69 kg ===
| Means of qualification | Quotas | Qualified |
|---|---|---|
| Host Nation | 1 | Madelaine Rosher (SCO) |
| 2025 Commonwealth Championships | ~~1~~ | ~~Islamiyat Yusuf (NGR)~~ |
| IWF Commonwealth Rankings | 8 | Charlotte Simoneau (CAN); Harjinder Kaur (IND); Erin Barton (ENG); Nya Hayman (AUS); Tenishia Thornton (MLT); Ketty Lent (MRI); Laryne Jefferies (RSA); Chloe Hood (WAL) |
| Bipartite Invitation | 1 | Holly O'Shea (GIB) |
| Reallocation | 1 | Olivia Selemaia (NZL) |
| TOTAL | 11 | |

=== 77 kg ===
| Means of qualification | Quotas | Qualified |
|---|---|---|
| Host Nation | 1 | Agata Herbert (SCO) |
| 2025 Commonwealth Championships | ~~1~~0 | ~~Sarah Ovayioza (NGR)~~ |
| IWF Commonwealth Rankings | 8 | Rosalie Dumas (CAN); Isabella Brown (ENG); Sanjana (IND); Laura Hughes (WAL); Georgia Theron (NZL); Isabella Andueza (AUS); Rachel Achieng Enock (KEN); Kaitlin Saunders (NIR) |
| Bipartite Invitation | 1 | Seine Stowers (SAM) |
| TOTAL | 10 | |

=== 86 kg ===
| Means of qualification | Quotas | Qualified |
|---|---|---|
| Host Nation | ~~1~~ 0 | ~~TBD (SCO)~~ |
| 2025 Commonwealth Championships | 1 | Eileen Cikamatana (AUS) |
| IWF Commonwealth Rankings | ~~8~~ 7 | Madias Ngake (ENG); Litia Nacagilevu (NZL); Rose Beaudoin (CAN); ~~Vanshita Verma (IND)~~; Sefulu Seuao (SAM); ~~Miriama Taletawa (FIJ)~~; Ajah Pritchard Lolo (VAN); Mary Taiwo Osijo (NGR); Juliana Ongonga (KEN) |
| Bipartite Invitation | 1 | Chathurika Priyanthi (SRI) |
| Reallocated | 1 | Cheyenne Smith (RSA) |
| TOTAL | 10 | |

Hosts Scotland declined their automatic entry in this weight class.

=== +86 kg ===
| Means of qualification | Quotas | Qualified |
|---|---|---|
| Host Nation | ~~1~~ 0 | ~~TBD (SCO)~~ |
| 2025 Commonwealth Championships | 1 | Iuniarra Sipaia (SAM) |
| IWF Commonwealth Rankings | ~~8~~ 9 | Emily Campbell (ENG); Tui-Alofa Patolo (NZL); Etta Love (CAN); Siti Binti-Draman (MAS); Martina Devi (IND); Mata McDonald (COK); Malia Timo (TUV); Melissa Yee (SGP) |
| Bipartite Invitation | 1 | Tenganga Taunikarawa (KIR) |
| Reallocated | 1 | Krys Campbell (JAM) |
| TOTAL | 11 | |

Hosts Scotland declined their automatic entry in this weight class.
