= List of Indian records in Olympic weightlifting =

The following are the national records in Olympic weightlifting in India. Records are maintained in each weight class for the snatch lift, clean and jerk lift, and the total for both lifts by the Indian Weightlifting Federation (IWLF).

== Current records ==
Key to tables: Awaiting ratification Not ratified or later rescinded by IWLF

=== Men ===
Event	Record	Athlete	Date	Meet	Place	Ref
60 kg
Snatch						
Clean & Jerk						
Total						
65 kg
Snatch						
Clean & Jerk						
Total						
71 kg
Snatch						
Clean & Jerk						
Total						
79 kg
Snatch	149 kg	Ajaya Babu Valluri	27 July 2026	Commonwealth Games	Glasgow, United Kingdom	
Clean & Jerk	184 kg	Ajaya Babu Valluri	27 July 2026	Commonwealth Games	Glasgow, United Kingdom	
Total	330 kg	Ajaya Babu Valluri	27 July 2026	Commonwealth Games	Glasgow, United Kingdom	
88 kg
Snatch						
Clean & Jerk						
Total						
94 kg
Snatch						
Clean & Jerk						
Total						
110 kg
Snatch						
Clean & Jerk						
Total						
+110 kg
Snatch	176 kg	Lovepreet Singh	30 July 2026	Commonwealth Games	Glasgow, United Kingdom	
Clean & Jerk	212 kg	Lovepreet Singh	30 July 2026	Commonwealth Games	Glasgow, United Kingdom	
Total	388 kg	Lovepreet Singh	30 July 2026	Commonwealth Games	Glasgow, United Kingdom	

=== Women ===
Event	Record	Athlete	Date	Meet	Place	Ref
48 kg
Snatch	85 kg	Mirabai Chanu	26 July 2026	Commonwealth Games	Glasgow, United Kingdom	
Clean & Jerk	105 kg	Mirabai Chanu	26 July 2026	Commonwealth Games	Glasgow, United Kingdom	
Total	190 kg	Mirabai Chanu	26 July 2026	Commonwealth Games	Glasgow, United Kingdom	
53 kg
Snatch	88 kg	Gyaneshwari Yadav	27 July 2026	Commonwealth Games	Glasgow, United Kingdom	
Clean & Jerk	111 kg	Gyaneshwari Yadav	27 July 2026	Commonwealth Games	Glasgow, United Kingdom	
Total	199 kg	Gyaneshwari Yadav	27 July 2026	Commonwealth Games	Glasgow, United Kingdom	
58 kg
Snatch	87 kg	Bindyarani Devi	27 July 2026	Commonwealth Games	Glasgow, United Kingdom	
Clean & Jerk	112 kg	Bindyarani Devi	27 July 2026	Commonwealth Games	Glasgow, United Kingdom	
Total	199 kg	Bindyarani Devi	27 July 2026	Commonwealth Games	Glasgow, United Kingdom	
63 kg
Snatch	93 kg	Nirupama Devi Seram	28 July 2026	Commonwealth Games	Glasgow, United Kingdom	
Clean & Jerk						
Total						
69 kg
Snatch	101 kg	Harjinder Kaur	28 July 2026	Commonwealth Games	Glasgow, United Kingdom	
Clean & Jerk	126 kg	Harjinder Kaur	28 July 2026	Commonwealth Games	Glasgow, United Kingdom	
Total	227 kg	Harjinder Kaur	28 July 2026	Commonwealth Games	Glasgow, United Kingdom	
77 kg
Snatch						
Clean & Jerk						
Total						
86 kg
Snatch						
Clean & Jerk						
Total						
+86 kg
Snatch						
Clean & Jerk						
Total						

== Historical records ==
=== Men (2018–2025) ===
Event	Record	Athlete	Date	Meet	Place	Ref
55 kg
Snatch	114 kg	Mukund Aher	28 December 2022	Indian Championships	Nagercoil, India	
Clean & Jerk	143 kg	Sanket Mahadev Sargar	25 February 2022	Singapore Weightlifting International	Singapore	
Total	256 kg	Sanket Mahadev Sargar	25 February 2022	Singapore Weightlifting International	Singapore	
61 kg
Snatch	124 kg	Rishikanta Singh	8 October 2024	Indian Championships	Nagrota Bagwan, India	
Clean & Jerk	165 kg	Muthupandi Raja	8 October 2024	Indian Championships	Nagrota Bagwan, India	
Total	289 kg	Muthupandi Raja	8 October 2024	Indian Championships	Nagrota Bagwan, India	
67 kg
Snatch	141 kg	Jeremy Lalrinnunga	10 December 2021	World Championships	Tashkent, Uzbekistan	
Clean & Jerk	167 kg	Jeremy Lalrinnunga	3 February 2020	Indian Championships	Kolkata, India	
Total	306 kg	Jeremy Lalrinnunga	20 December 2019	Qatar Cup	Doha, Qatar	
73 kg
Snatch	145 kg	Deepak Lather	11 August 2021	Indian Championships	Patiala, India	
Clean & Jerk	178 kg	N. Ajith	9 October 2024	Indian Championships	Nagrota Bagwan, India	
Total	318 kg	N. Ajith	9 October 2024	Indian Championships	Nagrota Bagwan, India	
81 kg
Snatch	149 kg	Ajay Singh	31 December 2022	Indian Championships	Nagercoil, India	
Clean & Jerk	190 kg	Ajay Singh	12 July 2019	Commonwealth Championships	Apia, Samoa	
Total	338 kg	Ajay Singh	12 July 2019	Commonwealth Championships	Apia, Samoa	
89 kg
Snatch	150 kg	Harshad Wadekar	26 February 2019	Indian Championships	Visakhapatnam, India	
Clean & Jerk	188 kg	Sambo Lapung	6 February 2020	Indian Championships	Kolkata, India	
Total	337 kg	Harshad Wadekar	26 February 2019	Indian Championships	Visakhapatnam, India	
96 kg
Snatch	157 kg	Vikas Thakur	9 February 2019	EGAT’s Cup	Chiang Mai, Thailand	
Clean & Jerk	198 kg	Sambo Lapung (Note: by official result source; Kojum Taba by federation source, probably a typo)	3 October 2022	National Games	Gandhinagar, India	
Total	353 kg	Vikas Thakur	9 February 2019	EGAT’s Cup	Chiang Mai, Thailand	
102 kg
Snatch	157 kg	Jagdish Vishwakarma	12 October 2024	Indian Championships	Nagrota Bagwan, India	
Clean & Jerk	202 kg	Pardeep Singh	13 July 2019	Commonwealth Championships	Apia, Samoa	
Total	351 kg	Pardeep Singh	26 April 2019	Asian Championships	Ningbo, China	
109 kg
Snatch	163 kg	Lovepreet Singh	3 August 2022	Commonwealth Games	Marston Green, United Kingdom	
Clean & Jerk	192 kg	Lovepreet Singh	3 August 2022	Commonwealth Games	Marston Green, United Kingdom	
Total	355 kg	Lovepreet Singh	3 August 2022	Commonwealth Games	Marston Green, United Kingdom	
+109 kg
Snatch	172 kg	Gurdeep Singh	17 December 2021	World Championships	Tashkent, Uzbekistan	
Clean & Jerk	223 kg	Gurdeep Singh	3 August 2022	Commonwealth Games	Marston Green, United Kingdom	
Total	391 kg	Gurdeep Singh	30 March 2022	Indian Championships	Bhubaneswar, India	

=== Women (2018–2025) ===
Event	Record	Athlete	Date	Meet	Place	Ref
45 kg
Snatch	76 kg	Sufna Jasmin	7 October 2024	Indian Championships	Nagrota Bagwan, India	
Clean & Jerk	95 kg	Chandrika Tarafdar	25 October 2023	National Games	Panaji, India	
Total	169 kg	Sufna Jasmin	7 October 2024	Indian Championships	Nagrota Bagwan, India	
49 kg
Snatch	88 kg	Saikhom Mirabai Chanu	4 February 2020	Indian Championships	Kolkata, India	
Clean & Jerk	119 kg	Saikhom Mirabai Chanu	17 April 2021	Asian Championships	Tashkent, Uzbekistan	
Total	205 kg	Saikhom Mirabai Chanu	17 April 2021	Asian Championships	Tashkent, Uzbekistan	
55 kg
Snatch	86 kg	Saikhom Mirabai Chanu	25 February 2022	Singapore Weightlifting International	Singapore	
Clean & Jerk	116 kg	Bindyarani Devi Sorokhaibam	30 July 2022	Commonwealth Games	Marston Green, United Kingdom	
Total	202 kg	Bindyarani Devi Sorokhaibam	30 July 2022	Commonwealth Games	Marston Green, United Kingdom	
59 kg
Snatch	94 kg	Popy Hazarika	4 February 2020	Indian Championships	Kolkata, India	
Clean & Jerk	115 kg	Erra Deexitha	23 February 2019	Indian Championships	Visakhapatnam, India	
Total	203 kg	Erra Deexitha	4 February 2020	Indian Championships	Kolkata, India	
64 kg
Snatch	95 kg	Rakhi Halder	22 December 2019	Qatar Cup	Doha, Qatar	
Clean & Jerk	124 kg	Rakhi Halder	22 September 2019	World Championships	Pattaya, Thailand	
Total	218 kg	Rakhi Halder	22 December 2019	Qatar Cup	Doha, Qatar	
71 kg
Snatch	98 kg	Harjinder Kaur	10 October 2024	Indian Championships	Nagrota Bagwan, India	
Clean & Jerk	125 kg	Harjinder Kaur	10 October 2024	Indian Championships	Nagrota Bagwan, India	
Total	223 kg	Harjinder Kaur	10 October 2024	Indian Championships	Nagrota Bagwan, India	
76 kg
Snatch	99 kg	Punam Yadav	27 March 2022	Indian Championships	Bhubaneswar, India	
Clean & Jerk	127 kg	Harmanpreet Kaur	11 October 2024	Indian Championships	Nagrota Bagwan, India	
Total	223 kg	Harmanpreet Kaur	11 October 2024	Indian Championships	Nagrota Bagwan, India	
81 kg
Snatch	100 kg	Punam Yadav	6 January 2023		Nagercoil, India	
Clean & Jerk	124 kg	Vanshita Verma	5 January 2024	Indian Championships	Itanagar, India	
Total	222 kg	Punam Yadav	6 January 2023		Nagercoil, India	
87 kg
Snatch	102 kg	Srishti Singh	26 February 2019	Indian Championships	Visakhapatnam, India	
Clean & Jerk	127 kg	Arockiya Alish	6 January 2024	Indian Championships	Itanagar, India	
Total	228 kg	Pavunraj Anuradha	26 February 2019	Indian Championships	Visakhapatnam, India	
+87 kg
Snatch	105 kg	Mehak Sharma	6 January 2024	Indian Championships	Itanagar, India	
Clean & Jerk	140 kg	Mehak Sharma	13 October 2024	Indian Championships	Nagrota Bagwan, India	
Total	244 kg	Mehak Sharma	13 October 2024	Indian Championships	Nagrota Bagwan, India	

== Historical records ==
=== Men (1998–2018) ===
Event	Record	Athlete	Date	Meet	Place	Ref
-56 kg
Snatch	119 kg	Vicky Batta	5 August 2005		Bangalore, India	
Clean & Jerk	147 kg	A.K. Pandian	17 January 2001		Visakhapatnam, India	
Total	262 kg	A.K. Pandian	17 January 2001		Visakhapatnam, India	
-62 kg
Snatch	126 kg	Deepak Lather	25 December 2015	Indian Championships	Patiala, India	
Clean & Jerk	153 kg	Rustam Sarang	27 December 2016	Indian Championships	Nagercoil, India	
Total	275 kg	Indian Standard				
-69 kg
Snatch	146 kg	Katulu Ravi Kumar	6 October 2010	Commonwealth Games	New Delhi, India	
Clean & Jerk	175 kg	Katulu Ravi Kumar	6 October 2010	Commonwealth Games	New Delhi, India	
Total	321 kg	Katulu Ravi Kumar	6 October 2010	Commonwealth Games	New Delhi, India	
-77 kg
Snatch	152 kg	Sathish Sivalingam	14 August 2015		Patiala, India	
Clean & Jerk	187 kg	Sathish Sivalingam	14 August 2015		Patiala, India	
Total	339 kg	Sathish Sivalingam	14 August 2015		Patiala, India	
-85 kg
Snatch	156 kg	Ragala Venkat Rahul	7 September 2015	Commonwealth Junior Championships	Gold Coast, Australia	
Clean & Jerk	195 kg	Ragala Venkat Rahul	7 September 2015	Commonwealth Junior Championships	Gold Coast, Australia	
Total	351 kg	Ragala Venkat Rahul	7 September 2015	Commonwealth Junior Championships	Gold Coast, Australia	
-94 kg
Snatch	159 kg	Vikas Thakur	8 April 2018	Commonwealth Games	Gold Coast, Australia	
Clean & Jerk	196 kg	Vikas Thakur	3 December 2017	World Championships	Anaheim, United States	
Total	351 kg	Vikas Thakur	3 December 2017	World Championships	Anaheim, United States	
-105 kg
Snatch	161 kg	Mohanlal Syamlal	1 April 2014	Indian Championships	Nagpur, India	
Clean & Jerk	200 kg	Pardeep Singh	9 April 2018	Commonwealth Games	Gold Coast, Australia	
Total	352 kg	Pardeep Singh	9 April 2018	Commonwealth Games	Gold Coast, Australia	
+105 kg
Snatch	175 kg	Gurdeep Singh	9 April 2018	Commonwealth Games	Gold Coast, Australia	
Clean & Jerk	217 kg	Gurdeep Singh	25 January 2018	Indian Championships	Moodabidri, India	
Total	390 kg	Gurdeep Singh	25 January 2018	Indian Championships	Moodabidri, India	

=== Women (1998–2018) ===
Event	Record	Athlete	Date	Meet	Place	Ref
-48 kg
Snatch	86 kg	Saikhom Mirabai Chanu	5 April 2018	Commonwealth Games	Gold Coast, Australia	
Clean & Jerk	110 kg	Saikhom Mirabai Chanu	5 April 2018	Commonwealth Games	Gold Coast, Australia	
Total	196 kg	Saikhom Mirabai Chanu	5 April 2018	Commonwealth Games	Gold Coast, Australia	
-53 kg
Snatch	90 kg	W. Nandini Devi	19 July 2003		Patiala, India	
Clean & Jerk	115 kg	W. Nandini Devi	19 July 2003		Patiala, India	
Total	205 kg	W. Nandini Devi	19 July 2003		Patiala, India	
-58 kg
Snatch	93 kg	Renu Bala	27 December 2005		Yamuna Nagar, India	
Clean & Jerk	119 kg	Renu Bala	20 December 2007		Bhubaneswar, India	
Total	209 kg	Renu Bala	20 December 2007		Bhubaneswar, India	
-63 kg
Snatch	105 kg	Karnam Malleswari	10 December 1998		Bangkok, Thailand	
Clean & Jerk	128 kg	Rakhi Halder	23 January 2018	Indian Championships	Moodabidri, India	
Total	230 kg	Karnam Malleswari	10 December 1998		Bangkok, Thailand	
-69 kg
Snatch	110 kg	Karnam Malleswari	19 September 2000	Olympic Games	Sydney, Australia	
Clean & Jerk	130 kg	Karnam Malleswari	19 September 2000	Olympic Games	Sydney, Australia	
Total	240 kg	Karnam Malleswari	19 September 2000	Olympic Games	Sydney, Australia	
-75 kg
Snatch	111 kg	P. Sailaja	1 September 2005		Bangalore, India	
Clean & Jerk	138 kg	P. Sailaja	1 September 2005		Bangalore, India	
Total	249 kg	P. Sailaja	1 September 2005		Bangalore, India	
-90 kg
Snatch	97 kg	Anuratha	24 January 2018	Indian Championships	Moodabidri, India	
Clean & Jerk	115 kg	Anuratha	24 January 2018	Indian Championships	Moodabidri, India	
Total	212 kg	Anuratha	24 January 2018	Indian Championships	Moodabidri, India	
+90 kg
Snatch	112 kg	Simple Kaur	16 January 2004		New Delhi, India	
Clean & Jerk	147 kg	Simple Kaur	20 February 2005		Guwahati, India	
Total	255 kg	Simple Kaur	20 February 2005		Guwahati, India	
