= Para powerlifting at the 2026 Commonwealth Games =

- Para powerlifting pictogram
- Venue: SEC Armadillo
- Dates: 24 July 2026
- Competitors: 47 from 15 nations

Para powerlifting was one of the sports to be contested at the 2026 Commonwealth Games, held in Glasgow, Scotland. The competitions were contested at the SEC Armadillo. This was the seventh staging of para powerlifting at the Commonwealth Games since its inclusion in 2002, and the second staging within Scotland and Glasgow specifically.

The competition took place on 24 July 2026, spread across four weight classes (two per gender).

A total of 43 para powerlifters from 15 CGA's competed.

== Schedule ==
The competition schedule is as follows:

Date Event	Fri 24	
Session →	A	E
Men's lightweight	F	
Men's heavyweight		F
Women's lightweight	F	
Women's heavyweight		F

== Venue ==
The para powerlifting competition will be held at the SEC Armadillo in Glasgow.

== Medal summary ==
=== Medal table ===
* Host nation (Scotland)

Rank	CGA	Gold	Silver	Bronze	Total
1	Nigeria	3	3	0	6
2	England	1	1	1	3
3	Australia	0	0	1	1
3	India	0	0	1	1
3	Malaysia	0	0	1	1
Totals (5 entries)		4	4	4	12

=== Medalists ===
Event	Gold		Silver		Bronze	
Men's lightweight	Mark Swan; England	153.9	Roland Ezuruike; Nigeria	153.9	Bonnie Bunyau Gustin; Malaysia	153.5
Men's heavyweight	Riluwan Idris; Nigeria	132.8	Matthew Harding; England	131	Jhandu Kumar; India	130.9
Women's lightweight	Esther Nworgu; Nigeria	119.0	Esther Oyema; Nigeria	115.5	Olivia Broome; England	106.6
Women's heavyweight	Folashade Oluwafemiayo; Nigeria	134.8 WR	Rita Ferdinand; Nigeria	128.2	Hani Watson; Australia	111.5

== Participating nations ==
There were 15 participating Commonwealth Games Associations (CGAs) in para powerlifting with a total of 47 athletes (23 men and 24 women). The number of athletes a nation entered is in parentheses beside the name of the country.

- Australia (6)
- Cameroon (3)
- Cyprus (1)
- England (6)
- Ghana (1)
- India (7)
- Isle of Man (1)
- Kenya (4)
- Malaysia (3)
- Malta (1)
- Nigeria (7)
- Scotland (2)
- Solomon Islands (1)
- Uganda (3)
- Vanuatu (1)
