= Para powerlifting at the 2022 Commonwealth Games =

- Venue: National Exhibition Centre
- Dates: 4 August 2022

Para powerlifting was one of the sports contested at the 2022 Commonwealth Games, held in Birmingham, England. This was the sixth staging of para powerlifting at the Commonwealth Games since its inclusion in 2002, and the second staging within England specifically.

The competition took place on 4 August 2022, spread across four weight classes (two per gender).

== Schedule ==
The competition schedule is as follows:

Date Event	Thu 4	
Session →	A	E
Men's lightweight	F	
Men's heavyweight		F
Women's lightweight	F	
Women's heavyweight		F

== Venue ==
The para powerlifting competition was held at the National Exhibition Centre in Solihull. Five other sports - badminton, boxing, netball, table tennis, and weightlifting - also took place there.

== Qualification ==
A total of 40 powerlifters (20 per gender) qualified to compete at the Games. Nations earned two quotas per weight class, allocated as follows:

- Athletes in the World Para Powerlifting (WPPO) Commonwealth Rankings as of 25 April 2022.
- Recipients of a CGF/WPPO Bipartite Invitation.

== Medal summary ==
=== Medal table ===
* Host nation (England)

Rank	CGA	Gold	Silver	Bronze	Total
1	Nigeria	2	1	1	4
2	England*	1	2	0	3
3	Malaysia	1	0	0	1
4	Scotland	0	1	0	1
5	Australia	0	0	2	2
6	Kenya	0	0	1	1
Totals (6 entries)		4	4	4	12

=== Medalists ===
Event	Gold		Silver		Bronze	
Men's lightweight	Bonnie Bunyau Gustin; Malaysia	154.60 GR	Mark Swan; England	145.50	Nnamdi Innocent; Nigeria	132.50
Men's heavyweight	Ikechukwu Obichukwu; Nigeria	133.6 GR	Micky Yule; Scotland	130.9	Ben Wright; Australia	119.1
Women's lightweight	Zoe Newson; England	102.2	Olivia Broome; England	100	Hellen Wawira; Kenya	98.5
Women's heavyweight	Folashade Oluwafemiayo; Nigeria	123.4 GR, WR	Bose Omolayo; Nigeria	115.2	Hani Watson; Australia	98.5
