= List of Commonwealth records in Olympic weightlifting =

The following are the Commonwealth records in Olympic weightlifting. Records are maintained in each weight class for the snatch lift, clean and jerk lift, and the total for both lifts by the Commonwealth Weightlifting Federation (CWF).

== Current records ==
Key to tables: Awaiting ratification Not ratified or later rescinded by CWF

=== Men ===
Event	Record	Athlete	Nation	Date	Meet	Place	Ref
60 kg
Snatch	125 kg	Aniq Kasdan	Malaysia	13 December 2025	SEA Games	Chonburi, Thailand	
Clean & Jerk	160 kg	Aniq Kasdan	Malaysia	13 December 2025	SEA Games	Chonburi, Thailand	
Total	285 kg	Aniq Kasdan	Malaysia	13 December 2025	SEA Games	Chonburi, Thailand	
65 kg
Snatch	135 kg	Muhamad Aznil Bidin	Malaysia	4 October 2025	World Championships	Førde, Norway	
Clean & Jerk	173 kg	Muhamad Aznil Bidin	Malaysia	13 December 2025	SEA Games	Chonburi, Thailand	
Total	306 kg	Muhamad Aznil Bidin	Malaysia	13 December 2025	SEA Games	Chonburi, Thailand	
71 kg
Snatch	151 kg	Edidiong Umoafia	Nigeria	9 November 2025	Islamic Solidarity Games	Riyadh, Saudi Arabia	
Clean & Jerk	175 kg	Ajith Narayana	India	5 October 2025	World Championships	Førde, Norway	
Total	326 kg	Edidiong Umoafia	Nigeria	9 November 2025	Islamic Solidarity Games	Riyadh, Saudi Arabia	
79 kg
Snatch	152 kg	Valluri Ajaya Babu	India	28 August 2025	Commonwealth Championships	Ahmedabad, India	
Clean & Jerk	187 kg	Muhammad Erry Hidayat	Malaysia	15 December 2025	SEA Games	Chonburi, Thailand	
Total	336 kg	Muhammad Erry Hidayat	Malaysia	15 December 2025	SEA Games	Chonburi, Thailand	
88 kg
Snatch	164 kg	Braydon Kennedy	Canada	28 August 2025	Commonwealth Championships	Ahmedabad, India	
Clean & Jerk	191 kg	Sairaj Pardeshi	India	28 August 2025	Commonwealth Championships	Ahmedabad, India	
Total	348 kg	Sairaj Pardeshi	India	28 August 2025	Commonwealth Championships	Ahmedabad, India	
94 kg
Snatch	161 kg	Oliver Saxton	Australia	16 November 2025	Australian Championships	Hawthorn, Australia	
Clean & Jerk	200 kg	Mohamad Syahmi Nor Ghazali	Malaysia	16 December 2025	SEA Games	Chonburi, Thailand	
Total	357 kg	Standard					
110 kg
Snatch	173 kg	Taniela Rainibogi	Fiji	1 May 2026	Oceania Championships	Apia, Samoa	
Clean & Jerk	214 kg	Jack Opeloge	Samoa	1 May 2026	Oceania Championships	Apia, Samoa	
Total	383 kg	Standard					
+110 kg
Snatch	185 kg	Sanele Mao	Samoa	1 May 2026	Oceania Championships	Apia, Samoa	
Clean & Jerk	225 kg	Sanele Mao	Samoa	1 May 2026	Oceania Championships	Apia, Samoa	
Total	410 kg	Sanele Mao	Samoa	1 May 2026	Oceania Championships	Apia, Samoa	

=== Women ===
Event	Record	Athlete	Nation	Date	Meet	Place	Ref
48 kg
Snatch	84 kg	Mirabai Chanu	India	25 August 2025	Commonwealth Championships	Ahmedabad, India	
Snatch	85 kg	Mirabai Chanu	India	26 July 2026	Commonwealth Games	Glasgow, United Kingdom	
Clean & Jerk	115 kg	Mirabai Chanu	India	4 October 2025	World Championships	Førde, Norway	
Total	199 kg	Mirabai Chanu	India	4 October 2025	World Championships	Førde, Norway	
53 kg
Snatch	90 kg	Onome Didih	Nigeria	26 August 2025	Commonwealth Championships	Ahmedabad, India	
Snatch	93 kg	Onome Didih	Nigeria	27 July 2026	Commonwealth Games	Glasgow, United Kingdom	
Clean & Jerk	108 kg	Standard					
Clean & Jerk	113 kg	Onome Didih	Nigeria	27 July 2026	Commonwealth Games	Glasgow, United Kingdom	
Total	197 kg	Onome Omolola Didih	Nigeria	26 August 2025	Commonwealth Championships	Ahmedabad, India	
Total	206 kg	Onome Didih	Nigeria	27 July 2026	Commonwealth Games	Glasgow, United Kingdom	
58 kg
Snatch	101 kg	Rafiatu Lawal	Nigeria	4 October 2025	World Championships	Førde, Norway	
Snatch	103 kg	Rafiatu Lawal	Nigeria	27 July 2026	Commonwealth Games	Glasgow, United Kingdom	
Clean & Jerk	128 kg	Rafiatu Lawal	Nigeria	4 October 2025	World Championships	Førde, Norway	
Total	229 kg	Rafiatu Lawal	Nigeria	4 October 2025	World Championships	Førde, Norway	
63 kg
Snatch	103 kg	Maude Charron	Canada	27 August 2025	Commonwealth Championships	Ahmedabad, India	
Clean & Jerk	133 kg	Maude Charron	Canada	5 October 2025	World Championships	Førde, Norway	
Total	236 kg	Maude Charron	Canada	5 October 2025	World Championships	Førde, Norway	
69 kg
Snatch	110 kg	Charlotte Simoneau	Canada	22 August 2025	Junior Pan American Games	Asunción, Paraguay	
Clean & Jerk	131 kg	Islamiyat Yusuf	Nigeria	28 August 2025	Commonwealth Championships	Ahmedabad, India	
Clean & Jerk	132 kg	Charlotte Simoneau	Canada	28 July 2026	Commonwealth Games	Glasgow, United Kingdom	
Total	240 kg	Charlotte Simoneau	Canada	22 August 2025	Junior Pan American Games	Asunción, Paraguay	
77 kg
Snatch	116 kg	Sarah Matthew	Nigeria	11 November 2025	Islamic Solidarity Games	Riyadh, Saudi Arabia	
Clean & Jerk	142 kg	Seine Stowers	Samoa	30 April 2026	Oceania Championships	Apia, Samoa	
Total	254 kg	Seine Stowers	Samoa	30 April 2026	Oceania Championships	Apia, Samoa	
86 kg
Snatch	115 kg	Eileen Cikamatana	Australia	4 July 2025	Pacific Mini Games	Meyuns, Palau	
Clean & Jerk	148 kg	Eileen Cikamatana	Australia	13 April 2025	Oceania Cup	Hawthorn, Australia	
Total	260 kg	Eileen Cikamatana	Australia	13 April 2025	Oceania Cup	Hawthorn, Australia	
+86 kg
Snatch	126 kg	Standard					
Clean & Jerk	161 kg	Emily Campbell	England	21 April 2025	European Championships	Chișinău, Moldova	
Clean & Jerk	163 kg	Emily Campbell	England	30 July 2026	Commonwealth Games	Glasgow, United Kingdom	
Total	281 kg	Emily Campbell	England	21 April 2025	European Championships	Chișinău, Moldova	
