= Nigeria at the 2026 Commonwealth Games =

- Flag of Nigeria
- CG code: NGR
- CGA: Nigeria Olympic Committee
- Website: nigeriaolympic.org

in Glasgow, Scotland 23 July 2026 – 2 August 2026
- Competitors: 73 in 7 sports
- Flag bearer: Abdul Jabar Adama
- Baton bearer: Folashade Oluwafemiayo
- Medals Ranked 7th: Gold 10 Silver 7 Bronze 7 Total 24

Commonwealth Games appearances (overview)
- 1950; 1954; 1958; 1962; 1966; 1970; 1974; 1978; 1982; 1986; 1990; 1994; 1998; 2002; 2006; 2010; 2014; 2018; 2022; 2026; 2030

Nigeria competed at the 2026 Commonwealth Games in Glasgow, Scotland. This marked Nigeria's 16th participation at the games, after making its debut at the 1950 British Empire Games.

The Nigerian team consisted of 73 athletes. Originally, sprinter Miracle Ezechukwu was scheduled to be the country's flagbearer. However, later swimmer Abdul Jabar Adama carried the country's flagbearer and para powerlifter Folashade Oluwafemiayo was the baton bearer during the opening ceremony.

The Nigerian team won 24 medals (ten gold, seven silver and seven bronze). This ranked the country 7th on the medal table.

== Competitors ==
The following is the list of number of competitors participating at the Games per sport/discipline.

Sport		Men	Women	Total
3x3 basketball	3x3	4	0	4
3x3 basketball	Wheelchair 3x3	0	4	4
Athletics	Athletics	13	17	30
Athletics	Para-athletics	1	4	5
Boxing		3	3	6
Judo		3	1	4
Swimming		3	1	4
Track cycling (Para)		1	0	1
Weightlifting	Para powerlifting	3	4	7
Weightlifting	Weightlifting	3	5	8
Total		34	39	73

== Medallists ==
The following Nigerian competitors won medals at the games. In the by discipline sections below, medallists' names are bolded.

Medal	Name	Sport	Event	Date	Ref.
Gold	Esther Nworgu	Para powerlifting	Women's lightweight	24 July	
Gold	Folashade Oluwafemiayo	Para powerlifting	Women's heavyweight	24 July	
Gold	Riluwan Idris	Para powerlifting	Men's heavyweight	24 July	
Gold	Edidiong Umoafia	Weightlifting	Men's 71 kg	27 July	
Gold	Onome Didih	Weightlifting	Women's 53 kg	27 July	
Gold	Rafiatu Lawal	Weightlifting	Women's 58 kg	27 July	
Gold	Goodness Nwachukwu	Athletics	Women's discus throw F44	29 July	
Gold	Chukwuebuka Enekwechi	Athletics	Men's shot put	30 July	
Gold	Ezekiel Nathaniel	Athletics	Men's 400 m hurdles	31 July	
Gold	Samuel Ogazi	Athletics	Men's 400 metres	1 August	
Silver	Roland Ezuruike	Para powerlifting	Men's lightweight	24 July	
Silver	Esther Oyema	Para powerlifting	Women's lightweight	24 July	
Silver	Rita Ferdinand	Para powerlifting	Women's heavyweight	24 July	
Silver	Ruth Nyong	Weightlifting	Women's 48 kg	26 July	
Silver	Jessica Oji	Athletics	Women's shot put	29 July	
Silver	Udodi Onwuzurike	Athletics	Men's 200 metres	31 July	
Silver	Ruth Usoro	Athletics	Women's long jump	1 August	
Bronze	Temitope Adeshina	Athletics	Women's high jump	28 July	
Bronze	Kayinsola Ajayi	Athletics	Men's 100 metres	28 July	
Bronze	Tobi Amusan	Athletics	Women's 100 m hurdles	29 July	
Bronze	Enku Ekuta	Judo	Women's 63 kg	1 August	
Bronze	Ella Onojuvwevwo	Athletics	Women's 400 metres	1 August	
Bronze	Favour Ashe; Kayinsola Ajayi; Chidera Ezeakor; Adekalu Fakorede; Udodi Onwuzurike	Athletics	Men's 4 × 100 metres relay	1 August	
Bronze	Ezekiel Nathaniel; Patience Okon George; Samuel Ogazi; Ella Onojuvwevwo; Udo Edidiong; Esther Joseph	Athletics	Mixed 4 × 400 metres relay	1 August	

== 3x3 basketball ==
Nigeria men's 3x3 and women's wheelchair basketball teams qualified, for a total of eight athletes (four per team).

Summary

Team	Event	Group stage						Play-ins	Semifinal	Final / BM / CM	
Team	Event	Opposition Score	Opposition Score	Opposition Score	Opposition Score	Opposition Score	Rank	Opposition Score	Opposition Score	Opposition Score	Rank
Nigeria Men's	Men's 3x3	Cayman Islands; W 21–17	Australia; L 15–21	New Zealand; L 10–21	Scotland; L 16–21	Guyana; W 20–19	4	Did not advance			7
Nigeria Women's wheelchair	Women's wheelchair	Scotland; L 1–16	Wales; L 1–17	India; W 7–6	—		3 QF	Wales; L 2–19	Did not advance		6

=== Men's tournament ===
Roster

- Marcel Esonwune
- Ike Nwamu
- Esosa Okundaye
- Robert Ukawuba

Group A

Pos	Team	Pld	W	L	PF	PA	PD	Qualification
1	Australia	5	5	0	105	60	+45	Direct to semi-finals
2	New Zealand	5	4	1	99	56	+43	Quarter-finals
3	Scotland (H)	5	3	2	90	85	+5	Quarter-finals
4	Nigeria	5	2	3	82	99	−17	
5	Guyana	5	1	4	68	100	−32	
6	Cayman Islands	5	0	5	61	105	−44	

Source: Glasgow 2026
Rules for classification: 1) Wins; 2) Head-to-head record; 3) Points scored.
(H) Hosts

24 July 2026
10:50

Report

Nigeria	21–17	Cayman Islands
Pts: Nwamu, Okundaye 6		Pts: Lansdell 11

SEC, Glasgow

24 July 2026
17:25

Report

Australia	21–15	Nigeria
Pts: Antonio 12		Pts: Nwamu 9

SEC, Glasgow

24 July 2026
19:00

Report

New Zealand	21–10	Nigeria
Pts: Lewis 8		Pts: Ukawuba, Okundaye 3

SEC, Glasgow

26 July 2026
13:10

Report

Scotland	21–16	Nigeria
Pts: McCormack 8		Pts: Esonwune 7

SEC, Glasgow

26 July 2026
18:40

Report

Nigeria	20–19	Guyana
Pts: Okundayo 9		Pts: Ramlall 10

SEC, Glasgow

=== Women's wheelchair tournament ===
Roster

- Nofisat Adefala
- Gbemisola Ijigbamigbe
- Chituru Nwaozuzu
- Titilayo Olaleye

Group play

Pos	Team	Pld	W	L	PF	PA	PD	Qualification
1	Scotland	3	3	0	53	7	+46	Semi-finals
2	Wales	3	2	1	35	18	+17	Quarter-finals
3	Nigeria	3	1	2	9	39	−30	Quarter-finals
4	India	3	0	3	11	44	−33	

Source: Glasgow 2026
Rules for classification: 1) Wins; 2) Head-to-head record; 3) Points scored.

25 July 2026
16:10

Report

Scotland	16–1	Nigeria
Pts: Love 7		Pts: Adefala 1

SEC Centre, Glasgow

26 July 2026
19:55

Report

Nigeria	1–17	Wales
Pts: Nwaozuzu 1		Pts: Lander 7

SEC Centre, Glasgow

27 July 2026
19:30

Report

India	6–7	Nigeria
Pts: Jadhav 4		Pts: Adefala 6

SEC Centre, Glasgow

Play-ins

28 July 2026
21:00

Report

Australia	19–2	Nigeria
Pts: Munro-Cook 8		Pts: Adefala, Olaleye 1

SEC Centre, Glasgow

== Athletics ==
Nigeria entered 35 athletes (14 men and 21 women), including five in para athletics (one man and four women). Israel Okon, Ese Brume and Favour Onyah were named to the team but did not compete in any event.

Key

Ranks given for track events are within the athlete's heat only.

- Q = Qualified for the next round
- q = Qualified for the next round as a fastest loser or, in field events, by position without achieving the qualifying target

Men
Track events

Athlete	Event	Heat		Semifinal		Final	
Athlete	Event	Result	Rank	Result	Rank	Result	Rank
Favour Ashe	100 m	10.10	1 q	10.07	5	Did not advance	
Adekalu Fakorede	100 m	10.21	2 q	10.06	4	Did not advance	
Kayinsola Ajayi	100 m	Bye		9.94	1 Q	9.90	3rd place, bronze medalist(s)
Alaba Akintola	200 m	20.96	3	Did not advance			
Udodi Onwuzurike	200 m	20.31	1 q	20.22	2 Q	20.09	2nd place, silver medalist(s)
Udo Edidiong	400 m	45.73	1 q	45.55	2 Q	45.81	8
Samuel Ogazi	400 m	Bye		44.52	1 Q	44.25	1st place, gold medalist(s)
Ezekiel Nathaniel	400 m hurdles	48.69	1 Q	—N/a		48.47	1st place, gold medalist(s)
Favour Ashe; Kayinsola Ajayi; Adekalu Fakorede; Udodi Onwuzurike; Chidera Ezeakor*	4 x 100 m relay	38.46	1 Q	—N/a		38.12	3rd place, bronze medalist(s)

- Athletes with an * competed in the heat only

Field events

Athlete	Event	Qualification		Final	
Athlete	Event	Distance	Rank	Distance	Rank
Nnamdi Chinecherem	Javelin throw	75.27	12 q	76.29	10
Chukwuebuka Enekwechi	Shot put	20.03	1 Q	21.07	1st place, gold medalist(s)

Combined events – Decathlon

Athlete	Event	100 m	LJ	SP	HJ	400 m	110H	DT	PV	JT	1500 m	Final	Rank
Jami Schlueter	Result	10.70	7.16	15.35	1.97	49.71	14.56	36.92	4.60	44.16	4:41.54	7665	7
Jami Schlueter	Points	929	852	811	776	828	903	602	790	503	671	7665	7

Women
Track events

Athlete	Event	Heat		Semifinal		Final	
Athlete	Event	Result	Rank	Result	Rank	Result	Rank
Oluebube Ezechukwu	100 m	11.32	1 q	11.23	4	Did not advance	
Rosemary Chukwuma	100 m	Bye		11.82	8	Did not advance	
Blessing Ogundiran	100 m	Bye		DNS		Did not advance	
Obi Chukwuka	200 m	23.26	1 q	23.25	5	Did not advance	
Olayinka Olajide	200 m	23.62	3 q	23.79	7	Did not advance	
Patience George	400 m	53.27	4 q	53.21	5	Did not advance	
Esther Joseph	400 m	52.82	3 q	53.26	6	Did not advance	
Ella Onojuvwevwo	400 m	Bye		51.47	1 Q	51.00	3rd place, bronze medalist(s)
Tobi Amusan	100 m hurdles	12.19	1 Q	—N/a		12.60	3rd place, bronze medalist(s)
Obi Chukwuka; Miracle Ezechukwu; Prestina Ochonogor; Olayinka Olajide	4 x 100 m relay	43.93	2 Q	—N/a		43.74	6

Field events

Athlete	Event	Qualification		Final	
Athlete	Event	Distance	Rank	Distance	Rank
Temitope Adeshina	High jump	—N/a		1.90	3rd place, bronze medalist(s)
Ruth Usoro	Long jump	6.77	3 Q	6.87	2nd place, silver medalist(s)
Jessica Oji	Shot put	—N/a		17.87	2nd place, silver medalist(s)
Obiageri Amaechi	Discus throw	—N/a		53.68	6
Oyesade Olatoye	Hammer throw	62.75	10 q	63.27	8

Mixed

Athlete	Event	Heat		Final	
Athlete	Event	Result	Rank	Result	Rank
Ezekiel Nathaniel; Samuel Ogazi; Patience Okon George; Ella Onojuvwevwo; Udo Edidiong*; Esther Joseph*	Mixed 4 x 400 m relay	3:14.58	1 Q	3:12.85	3rd place, bronze medalist(s)

- Athletes with an * competed in the heat only

=== Para athletics ===
Track events

Athlete	Event	Final	
Athlete	Event	Result	Rank
Ifeanyi Christian	Men's 100 m T47	DNS	
Unyima Uwak	Women's 100 m T47	12.63	5

Field events

Athlete	Event	Final	
Athlete	Event	Distance	Rank
Eucharia Iyiazi	Women's shot put F57	NM	
Destiny Agbo	Women's discus throw F44	33.79	5
Goodness Nwachukwu	Women's discus throw F44	39.66 WR	1st place, gold medalist(s)

== Boxing ==
Nigeria entered six boxers, three men and three women.

Athlete	Event	Round of 32	Round of 16	Quarterfinals	Semifinals	Final	
Athlete	Event	Opposition Result	Opposition Result	Opposition Result	Opposition Result	Opposition Result	Rank
Abdulramon Abdulwahab	Men's 65 kg	Batte (UGA); L 0–5	Did not advance				
Ayomide Foly	Men's 70 kg	Thai (LES); L 0–4	Did not advance				
David Akintola	Men's 80 kg	Changalawe (TAN); L 1–4	Did not advance				
Kadijat Ajishola	Women's 54 kg	bye	Jones (WAL); L 2–3	Did not advance			
Blessing Orakwe	Women's 70 kg	—N/a		Pergoliti (AUS); L 2–3	Did not advance		
Patricia Mbata	Women's 75 kg	—N/a		Smith (ENG); L 2–3	Did not advance		

== Judo ==
Nigeria entered four judoka, three men and one woman. Enku Ekuta won the country's first judo medal since 2002.

Athlete	Event	Round of 32	Round of 16	Quarterfinals	Semifinals	Repechage	Final/BM	
Athlete	Event	Opposition Result	Opposition Result	Opposition Result	Opposition Result	Opposition Result	Opposition Result	Rank
Michael Agbo	Men's 66 kg	Bye	Flora (MRI); W 101–000	Middleton (AUS); W 002s1–000	Frascadore (CAN); L 000–102s1	Bye	Fryer (ENG); L 000–101	5
Kehinde Aremu	Men's 66 kg	Macdonald (SCO); L 000–101s2	Did not advance					
Taiwo Aremu	Men's 73 kg	Bye	Johnson (BAH); L 000s1–101	Did not advance				
Enku Ekuta	Women's 63 kg	—N/a	George (SOL); W 100–000	Middleton (AUS); L 000s2–100s2	Did not advance	Christie (NZL); W 010s2–000s1	Kabinda (ZAM); W 110s1–000s1	3rd place, bronze medalist(s)

== Swimming ==
Nigeria entered four swimmers (three men and one woman).

Athlete	Event	Heat		Semifinal		Final	
Athlete	Event	Time	Rank	Time	Rank	Time	Rank
Abdul Jabar Adama	Men's 50 m freestyle	22.67	11 Q	22.44	10	Did not advance	
Abdul Jabar Adama	Men's 100 m freestyle	50.43	20	Did not advance			
Abdul Jabar Adama	Men's 50 m butterfly	23.99	12 Q	23.52	8 Q	23.42	5
Abdul Jabar Adama	Men's 100 m butterfly	55.81	24	Did not advance			
Clinton Opute	Men's 50 m freestyle	23.15	18	Did not advance			
Clinton Opute	Men's 100 m freestyle	51.03	28	Did not advance			
Clinton Opute	Men's 200 m freestyle	2:03.35	35	—N/a		Did not advance	
Clinton Opute	Men's 200 m individual medley	2:15.40	19	—N/a		Did not advance	
Colins Obi Ebingha	Men's 100 m freestyle	50.86	27	Did not advance			
Colins Obi Ebingha	Men's 50 m butterfly	24.01	13 Q	23.96	13	Did not advance	
Colins Obi Ebingha	Men's 100 m butterfly	55.45	20	Did not advance			
Dorcas Oka	Women's 50 m freestyle	27.27	34	Did not advance			
Dorcas Oka	Women's 50 m breaststroke	34.72	21	Did not advance			
Dorcas Oka	Women's 100 m breaststroke	1:17.34	24	Did not advance			

== Track cycling (para) ==
Nigeria entered one male para track cyclist.

Sprint

Athlete	Event	Qualification		Semifinals	Final	
Athlete	Event	Time	Rank	Opposition Result	Opposition Result	Rank
Oyindamola Tijani; Pilot:Okeyah Bethel	Men's tandem sprint B	12.026	5	Did not advance		

Time trial

Athlete	Event	Time	Rank
Oyindamola Tijani; Pilot:Okeyah Bethel	Men's tandem time trial B	1:14.504	5

== Weightlifting ==
Nigeria qualified ten weightlifters (three men and seven women). However, two women did not compete, meaning the final team size was three men and five women.

Men

Athlete	Event	Snatch (kg)		Clean & Jerk (kg)		Total (kg)	Rank
Athlete	Event	Result	Rank	Result	Rank	Total (kg)	Rank
Favour Agboro	65 kg	122	5	157	4	279	4
Edidiong Umoafia	71 kg	147 GR	1	172	2	319 GR	1st place, gold medalist(s)
Adedapo Opadeji	79 kg	135	7	NM		DNF	

Women

Athlete	Event	Snatch (kg)		Clean & Jerk (kg)		Total (kg)	Rank
Athlete	Event	Result	Rank	Result	Rank	Total (kg)	Rank
Ruth Nyong	48 kg	75	3	93	2	168	2nd place, silver medalist(s)
Omolola Onome Didih	53 kg	93 CR, GR	1	113 CR, GR	1	206 CR, GR	1st place, gold medalist(s)
Rafiatu Lawal	58 kg	103 CR, GR	1	126 GR	1	229 GR	1st place, gold medalist(s)
Ruth Imoleayo Ayodele	63 kg	88	7	105	7	193	7
Mary Taiwo Osijo	86 kg	100	5	125	4	225	5

=== Para powerlifting ===
Nigeria entered seven para powerlifters.

Men

Athlete	Event	Lift (kg)	Points	Rank
Ibrahim Dauda	Lightweight	180	140.1	6
Roland Ezuruike	Lightweight	185	153.9	2nd place, silver medalist(s)
Riluwan Idris	Heavyweight	208	132.8	1st place, gold medalist(s)

Women

Athlete	Event	Lift (kg)	Points	Rank
Esther Nworgu	Lightweight	123	119.0	1st place, gold medalist(s)
Esther Oyema	Lightweight	125	115.5	2nd place, silver medalist(s)
Rita Ferdinand	Heavyweight	158	128.2	2nd place, silver medalist(s)
Folashade Oluwafemiayo	Heavyweight	175	134.8	1st place, gold medalist(s)
