= Valluri Srinivasa Rao =

Indian weightlifter

Srinivasa Rao
Personal information
- Full name: Valluri Srinivasa Rao
- Born: 20 October 1981 (age 44)

Valluri Srinivasa Rao (born 20 October 1981) is an Indian weightlifter from Andhra Pradesh. He had won the national championship several times. He works in the Corps of Electronic and Mechanical Engineering of the Indian Army.

== Career ==
On 25 October 2003, in the 2003 Afro-Asian Games held in Hyderabad, India, Rao won a silver medal in the Men's 56 kg category.

He won a gold medal in the Commonwealth Weightlifting Championships held in Penang, Malaysia in October 2009 in the same category.

On 4 October 2010 Rao won a bronze medal in the 2010 Commonwealth Games in Delhi in the Men's 56 kg category despite suffering due to a hamstring injury a month prior to the games.

On 13 November 2010, he ranked 8th in the 2010 Asian Games in Guangzhou in the Men's 56 kg category.

On 22 February 2011, Rao won a gold medal in the Men's 56 kg category of the 34th National Games in Jamshedpur. He represented the Services (SSCB) team in the event.

== Personal life ==
He hails from Kondavelagada village in Vizianagaram district of northern Andhra which has become famous for producing weightlifters. Both his sons are professional weightlifters. On 27 July 2026, his elder son Ajaya Babu Valluri won a silver medal at the 2026 Commonwealth Games in the Men's 79 Kg category.
