= Olivia Broome =

British Para powerlifter (born 2001)

Personal information
- Born: 13 June 2001 (age 25) Chorley, Lancashire, England
- Education: Loughborough University

Sport
- Sport: Para powerlifting
- Club: Loughborough University

Achievements and titles
- Paralympic finals: 2020
- World finals: 2017
- Regional finals: 2018
- Commonwealth finals: 2022
- Personal best: 119 kg (262 lb)
Medal record
Representing Great Britain
Paralympic Games
Bronze medal – third place	2020 Tokyo	50 kg
Bronze medal – third place	2024 Paris	50 kg
World Para Powerlifting Championships
Gold medal – first place	2021 Tbilisi	Junior 50 kg
Gold medal – first place	2023 Dubai	50 kg
Silver medal – second place	2021 Tbilisi	50 kg
European Para Powerlifting Championships
Gold medal – first place	2018 Berck	Junior 50 kg
Bronze medal – third place	2018 Berck	50 kg
Para Powerlifting World Cup
Bronze medal – third place	2020 Manchester	50 kg
Silver medal – second place	2021 Manchester	50 kg
Gold medal – first place	2021 Tbilisi	Junior 50 kg
Silver medal – second place	2021 Tbilisi	50 kg
Representing England
Commonwealth Games
Silver medal – second place	2022 Birmingham	Lightweight
Bronze medal – third place	2026 Glasgow	Lightweight

Olivia Broome (born 13 June 2001) is a Para powerlifter who won a bronze medal in the under-50 kg events at the 2020 and 2024 Summer Paralympics. She is the British and world junior record holder in the under-50 kg event, and has won multiple Para Powerlifting World Cup medals. She also won the junior under-50 kg event at the 2021 World Para Powerlifting Championships, silver medal in the women's 50 kg event, and a silver medal in the lightweight event at the 2022 Commonwealth Games.

== Personal life ==
Broome is from Chorley, Lancashire. She has been a student at Loughborough University.

== Career ==
Broome started para powerlifting at the age of 15, and trains at the British Weightlifting Centre at Loughborough University.

She came 10th in the under-50 kg event at the 2017 World Para Powerlifting Championships in Mexico City, and second in the junior under-50 kg event. She won a medal at that year's British Championships. She received the 2017 British Weight Lifting Young Lifter of the Year award. At the 2018 European Para Powerlifting Championships, she came third in the senior event, and first in the junior event. In 2019, she received some money from a Westminster charity, in order to help fund her attempts to qualify for the 2020 Summer Paralympics. Broome came third in the 2020 Para Powerlifting World Cup event in Manchester. At the March 2021 Para Powerlifting World Cup event in Manchester, Broome lifted 100 kilograms (220 lb), a new British record. She came second in the event. At the World Cup event in Tbilisi, Broome set a junior world record by lifting 106.5 kilograms (235 lb). She won the junior event, and finished second in the senior event.

In July 2021, Broome was selected for the under-50 kg event at the delayed 2020 Summer Paralympics. She was one of five Britons selected for para powerlifting events at the Games. At the Games, she finished third in the under-50 kg event, after lifting 107 kilograms (236 lb) on her second attempt.

A few months after the Paralympics, she won the gold medal in the junior women's 50 kg event at the 2021 World Para Powerlifting Championships held in Tbilisi, Georgia. She also won the silver medal in the senior women's 50 kg event. In May 2022, Broome was selected for the para powerlifting event at the 2022 Commonwealth Games. She finished second in the event, behind fellow English competitor Zoe Newson.

Broome finished third in the under-50 kg event at the 2024 Summer Paralympics, after lifting 119 kilograms (262 lb). She won the 2025 British Championships with a best lift of 116 kilograms (256 lb).

Representing England, Broome won the bronze medal in the lightweight powerlifting competition at the 2026 Commonwealth Games.
