= Jhandu Kumar =

Indian para powerlifter (born 1997)

Personal information
- Born: 1 January 1997 (age 29) Harnaut, Bihar, India

Sport
- Sport: Para powerlifting
- Weight class: Heavyweight
- Coached by: Gautam Singh; Rajinder Singh Rahelu
Medal record
Men's para powerlifting
Representing India
Commonwealth Games
Bronze medal – third place	2026 Glasgow	Heavyweight

Jhandu Kumar (born 1 August 1997) is an Indian para powerlifter. He won a bronze medal in the men's heavyweight category in the 2026 Commonwealth Games.

== Early life ==
Jhandu Kumar was born on 1 August 1997 in Harnaut in Nalanda district of Bihar. He legs were affected by polio contracted during his childhood. He family was engaged in selling vegetables, and he used to travel about 20 km (12 mi) daily to buy vegetables, which he later sold in the local market. He later started plying a e-rickshaw to support his training costs.

== Career ==
Jhandu Kumar initially trained at a local gymansium. He started competing in para athletics in 2017, and won medals in state level events in shot put and discus throw in the F55 classification. He was encouraged to try powerlifting during a state-level athletic event in Patna. Later, he trained under Gautam Singh, who ran a gymnasium in Harnaut, and won a silver medal in a powerlifting competition at Kolkata in 2022 with a lift of 135 kg (298 lb). Later that year, he won a gold medal at a local event while competing with able-bodied men.

In 2023, Jhandu Kumar sold his e-rickshaw to finance his participation in the National Championships in New Delhi. At the National Championships, he did not register a result, after he failed to lift 160 kg (350 lb). However, his effort was noticed by former paralympian and coach Rajinder Singh Rahelu, who invited him to train at the Sports Authority of India's National Centre of Excellence at Gandhinagar. He won a silver medal with a lift of 157 kg (346 lb) in the 72 kg weight category at the first Khelo India Para Games in 2023. In the National Championships later that year, he won the gold medal with a lift of 187 kg (412 lb).

In the 2025 National Championships, Jhandu Kumar set a new national record with a 205 kg (452 lb) lift. He won his first international medal later that year, a bronze, at the Para Powerlifting World Cup in Beijing. He set a new national record with a 206 kg (454 lb) lift in the 2025 Khelo India Para Games. He won a bronze medal at the Asia Oceania Powerlifting Championships in early 2026.

Jhandu Kumar competed in the heavyweight class in the para powerlifting events at the 2026 Commonwealth Games held in Glasgow in July 2026. He successfully lifted 181 kg (399 lb) with his first attempt and improved to 190 kg (420 lb) in his second attempt. He tried and failed to lift 196 kg (432 lb) in his third attempt. He won a bronze medal with 130.9 points, with a best lift of 190 kg (420 lb). This was India's first medal at the 2026 Commonwealth Games.
