= Para powerlifting at the Commonwealth Games =

Sport at quadrennial Commonwealth Games

Para powerlifting is one of the sports at the quadrennial Commonwealth Games. It has been a Commonwealth Games sport since 2002 (with core sport status through 2022), though it was initially held as part of the weightlifting competitions; in contrast to other parasports, it is categorised separately since the able-bodied equivalent is not a Games sport.

The sport made its debut as a single openweight competition for men in 2002; a women's openweight competition followed in 2010, and each gender has contested 2 weight classes since 2014. Nigeria has been the dominant nation in this sport, winning every single gold medal across five Games (and all medals awarded at Delhi 2010).

== Editions ==
Games	Year	Host city	Host country	Best nation
XVII	2002	Manchester	England	Nigeria
XVIII	2006	Melbourne	Australia	Nigeria
XIX	2010	Delhi	India	Nigeria
XX	2014	Glasgow	Scotland	Nigeria
XXI	2018	Gold Coast	Australia	Nigeria
XXII	2022	Birmingham	England	Nigeria
XX	2026	Glasgow	Scotland	Nigeria

== All-time medal table ==
Updated after 2026 Commonwealth Games.

Rank	Nation	Gold	Silver	Bronze	Total
1	Nigeria	9	6	1	16
2	England	2	4	4	10
3	Malaysia	1	1	1	3
4	Scotland	0	1	0	1
5	Australia	0	0	3	3
6	India	0	0	2	2
7	Kenya	0	0	1	1
Totals (7 entries)		12	12	12	36

*Note : Para powerlifting was part of weightlifting till the 2014 Commonwealth Games and are not included.

== Games records ==
Category	Record	Athlete	Nation	Date	Games	Place	Ref
Men's lightweight	154.6 pts	Bonnie Bunyau Gustin	Malaysia	4 August 2022	2022 Games	Birmingham, England	
Men's heavyweight	134.5 pts	Sudhir	India	4 August 2022	2022 Games	Birmingham, England	
Women's lightweight	119.0 pts	Esther Nworgu	Nigeria	24 July 2026	2026 Games	Glasgow, Scotland	
Women's heavyweight	134.8 pts	Folashade Oluwafemiayo	Nigeria	24 July 2026	2026 Games	Glasgow, Scotland	
