= Weightlifting at the 2026 Commonwealth Games – Men's 65 kg =

Weightlifting – Men's 65 kg at the 2026 Commonwealth Games
- Venue: Scottish Event Campus
- Dates: 26 July 2026
- Competitors: 11 from 11 nations
- Best lift: 299 kg GR

Medalists
gold medal	Aznil Bidin	Malaysia
silver medal	Raja Muthupandi	India
bronze medal	Morea Baru	Papua New Guinea

The Men's 65 kg weightlifting event at the 2026 Commonwealth Games took place at the SEC Armadillo, Glasgow on 26 July 2026. Malaysia's Aznil Bidin won the gold medal ahead of Raja Muthupandi from India who took silver with Morea Baru of Papua New Guinea claiming the bronze.

== Qualification ==
A total of 176 weightlifters (88 per gender) qualify to compete at the Games. Nations may earn one quota per weight class, allocated as follows:

- Automatic Qualification – Host CGA (1 per event)
- Direct Qualification – 2025 Commonwealth Weightlifting Champions (1 per event)
- IWF Commonwealth Ranking List (Ranking Period: 01 June 2025 – 18 May 2026) (8 per event)
- Bipartite Invitation (1 per event)

The following lifters qualified in the Men's 65 kg class.

Means of qualification	Quotas	Qualified
Host Nation	~~1~~ 0	~~TBD (SCO)~~
2025 Commonwealth Championships	1	Aznil Bidin (MAS)
IWF Commonwealth Rankings	~~8~~ 9	Muthupandi Raja (IND); Morea Baru (PNG); Dimitris Minasidis (CYP); Favour Omovigho Agboro (NGR); Sandu Duthshan Jayawardhana (SRI); Nashrul Abu Bakarr (BRU); Falevaa Tafi (SAM); Zach Snyman (RSA); Kaimauri Erati (KIR)
Bipartite Invitation	1	Apakuki Wakanibua (FIJ)
TOTAL	11	

Hosts Scotland declined their automatic entry in this weight class.

== Schedule ==
All times are British Summer Time (UTC+1)

Date	Time	Round
26 July 2026	18:30	Final

== Competition ==
The results of the event were as follows:

Rank	Athlete	Body weight (kg)	Snatch (kg)				Clean & Jerk (kg)				Total
Rank	Athlete	Body weight (kg)	1	2	3	Result	1	2	3	Result	Total
1st place, gold medalist(s)	Aznil Bidin (MAS)		130	133	~~135~~	133	162	166	~~170~~	166	299 GR
2nd place, silver medalist(s)	Muthupandi Raja (IND)		~~126~~	126	~~129~~	126	~~158~~	160	~~170~~	160	286
3rd place, bronze medalist(s)	Morea Baru (PNG)		120	~~124~~	125	125	157	~~162~~	~~162~~	157	282
4	Favour Agboro (NGR)		~~122~~	122	~~126~~	122	153	157	~~160~~	157	279
5	Sandu Krunarathna (SRI)		120	124	~~127~~	124	151	~~156~~	~~159~~	151	275
6	Muhammad Abu-Bakar (BRU)		~~110~~	110	~~115~~	110	140	143	~~146~~	143	253
7	Falevaa Tafi (SAM)		~~108~~	108	~~111~~	108	130	~~135~~	~~135~~	130	238
8	Kaimauri Erati (KIR)		90	95	100	100	~~115~~	115	~~121~~	115	215
9	Apikuki Wakanibua (FIJ)		86	91	95	95	110	~~120~~	120	120	215
DNF	Zach Snyman (RSA)		~~105~~	105	~~110~~	105	-	-	-	-	-
DNS	Dimitris Minasidis (CYP)		-	-	-	-	-	-	-	-	-
