= Brunei at the 2010 Commonwealth Games =

- CG code: BRU
- CGA: Brunei Darussalam National Olympic Council
- Website: bruneiolympic.org

in Delhi, India
- Competitors: ?
- Flag bearers: Opening: Closing:
- Medals: Gold 0 Silver 0 Bronze 0 Total 0

Commonwealth Games appearances (overview)
- 1990; 1994; 1998; 2002; 2006; 2010; 2014; 2018; 2022; 2026; 2030

Brunei competed in the 2010 Commonwealth Games held in Delhi. The country competed in lawn bowling only.

== Lawn bowls ==
Brunei has sent a team of 11 lawn bowlers to the 2010 Commonwealth games

Men

| Event | Player(s) | Rank |
|---|---|---|
| Singles | Ampuan Ahad Ampuan Kassim | - |
| Pairs | Abd Rahman Hj Omar; Hj Naim Brahim | - |
| Triples | Yakut Amit; Md Ali Bujang; Hj Rosli Hj Ibrahim | - |

Women

| Event | Player(s) | Rank |
|---|---|---|
| Pairs | Siti Ervi Fedarussanti; Esmawandy Ibrahim | - |
| Triples | Hajah Lilimaryani Ampuan Salleh; Hajah Fatmah Hj Ibrahim; Ajijah Ibrahim | - |

== See also ==
- 2010 Commonwealth Games
