= Powerlifting at the 2016 Summer Paralympics – Women's 45 kg =

Powerlifting – Women's 45 kg at the XV Paralympic Games
- Venue: Riocentro
- Date: 9 September 2016
- Competitors: 8 from 8 nations
- Winning lift: 107.0 kg WR

Medalists
1st place, gold medalist(s)		Hu Dandan	China
2nd place, silver medalist(s)		Latifat Tijani	Nigeria
3rd place, bronze medalist(s)		Zoe Newson	Great Britain

The women's 45 kg powerlifting event at the 2016 Summer Paralympics was contested on 9 September at Riocentro.

== Records ==
There are twenty powerlifting events, corresponding to ten weight classes each for men and women. The weight categories were significantly adjusted after the 2012 Games so most of the weights are new for 2016. As a result, no Paralympic record was available for this weight class prior to the competition. The existing world records were as follows.

Record Type	Weight	Country	Venue	Date
World record	106 kg	Hu Dandan (CHN)	Kuala Lumpur	24 February 2016
Paralympic record	–	–	–	–

== Results ==
Rank	Name	Body weight (kg)	Attempts (kg)				Result (kg)
Rank	Name	Body weight (kg)	1	2	3	4	Result (kg)
1st place, gold medalist(s)	Hu Dandan (CHN)	44.18	102.0	105.0	107.0 WR PR	108.0	107.0
2nd place, silver medalist(s)	Latifat Tijani (NGR)	43.35	101.00	~~104.0~~	106.0	–	106.0
3rd place, bronze medalist(s)	Zoe Newson (GBR)	43.56	92.0	102.0	~~105.0~~	~~107.5~~	102.0
4	Justyna Kozdryk (POL)	43.04	95.0	~~98.0~~	~~101.0~~	–	95.0
5	Zeinab Oteify (EGY)	44.57	90.0	~~92.0~~	~~92.0~~	–	90.0
6	Samira Guerioua (ALG)	43.33	85.0	~~88.0~~	~~88.0~~	–	85.0
–	Laura Cerero Gabriel (MEX)	44.11	~~75.0~~	~~80.0~~	~~80.0~~	–	NMR
–	Rayisa Toporkova (UKR)	44.07	~~90.0~~	~~90.0~~	~~90.0~~	–	NMR
