= Kondavelagada =

Village in Andhra Pradesh, India

- Village
- Interactive map of Kondavelagada
- Location within Andhra Pradesh
- Coordinates: 18°18′N 83°41′W
- Country: India
- State: Andhra Pradesh
- Districts: Vizianagaram

Population
  - Total: 4,651
- Time zone: UTC+5:30 (IST)

Kondavelagada is a village in Nellimarla Mandal of the Vizianagaram district, located in the state of Andhra Pradesh in India. As of 2011 the population of the village was 4651. This village is famous for producing several international weightlifters such as Valluri Srinivasa Rao, Santoshi Matsa and Ajaya Babu Valluri.
