= Para powerlifting at the 2022 Commonwealth Games – Men's lightweight =

Para powerlifting – Men's lightweight at the 2022 Commonwealth Games
- Venue: National Exhibition Centre
- Dates: 4 August
- Competitors: 10 from 8 nations
- Winning points: 154.6

Medalists
gold medal	Bonnie Bunyau Gustin	Malaysia
silver medal	Mark Swan	England
bronze medal	Nnamdi Innocent	Nigeria

The Men's lightweight powerlifting event at the 2022 Commonwealth Games took place at the National Exhibition Centre on 4 August 2022.

== Schedule ==
All times are British Summer Time (UTC+1)

Date	Time	Round
Saturday 4 August 2022	16:30	Final

== Result ==
Rank	Athlete	Body weight	#1	#2	#3	Result
1st place, gold medalist(s)	Bonnie Bunyau Gustin (MAS)	69.50	210	216	220	154.6 GR
2nd place, silver medalist(s)	Mark Swan (ENG)	66.10	~~193~~	199	202	145.5
3rd place, bronze medalist(s)	Nnamdi Innocent (NGR)	70.60	~~190~~	190	~~202~~	132.5
4	Thomas Kure (NGR)	63.40	180	~~194~~	~~197~~	132.5
5	Emmanuel Nii Tettey Oku (GHA)	65.80	168	172	175	126.4
6	Matthew Harding (ENG)	68.70	165	170	175	123.7
7	Conrat Atangana (CMR)	62.10	160	165	~~170~~	122.8
8	Richard Lubanza (ZAM)	62.70	140	145	~~150~~	100.9
9	Yohana Assa Mwila (TAN)	70.90	130	135	136	100.7
	Parmjeet Kumar (IND)	49.10	~~165~~	~~165~~	~~165~~	NM
