= Sanket Sargar =

Indian weightlifter (born 2000)

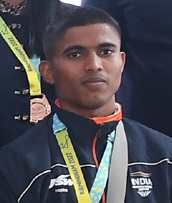
- Sargar in August 2022

Personal information
- Full name: Sanket Mahadev Sargar
- Nationality: Indian
- Born: 16 October 2000 (age 25) Sangli, Maharashtra, India
- Education: Shivaji University, Kolhapur

Sport
- Sport: Weightlifting
- Event: 55 kg
Medal record
Men's weightlifting
Representing India
Commonwealth Games
Silver medal – second place	2022 Birmingham	55 kg
- Updated on 30 July 2022

Sanket Mahadev Sargar (born 16 October 2000) is an Indian weightlifter who holds the national and Commonwealth record of 256 kg in the men's 55 kg weight class. He won the silver medal at the 2022 Commonwealth Games in Birmingham with a total lift of 248 kg.
