= Brunei at the 2014 Commonwealth Games =

- CG code: BRU
- CGA: Brunei Darussalam National Olympic Council
- Website: bruneiolympic.org

in Glasgow, Scotland
- Competitors: 1 in 1 sport
- Flag bearer: Muhammad Imaadi Abd Aziz
- Medals: Gold 0 Silver 0 Bronze 0 Total 0

Commonwealth Games appearances (overview)
- 1990; 1994; 1998; 2002; 2006; 2010; 2014; 2018; 2022; 2026; 2030

Brunei competed in the 2014 Commonwealth Games in Glasgow, Scotland from 23 July – 3 August 2014. Brunei's team consists of one solitary cyclist.

== Cycling ==
Brunei's sole athlete competed in three cycling events.

=== Road ===
Men

Athlete	Event	Time	Rank
Muhammad Imaadi Abd Aziz	Road race	DNF	

=== Track ===
Points Race

Athlete	Event	Sprint Points	Lap Points	Rank
Muhammad Imaadi Abd Aziz	Men's points race	1	0	DNQ

Scratch

Athlete	Event	Qualification rank	Finals rank
Muhammad Imaadi Abd Aziz	Men's scratch	DNF	
