= Weightlifting at the 2026 Commonwealth Games – Men's +110 kg =

Weightlifting – Men's 110+ kg at the 2026 Commonwealth Games
- Venue: Scottish Event Campus
- Dates: 30 July 2026
- Competitors: 11 from 11 nations
- Winning time: 389 kg

Medalists
gold medal	David Liti	New Zealand
silver medal	Lovepreet Singh	India
bronze medal	Andrew Griffiths	England

The Men's 110+ kg weightlifting event at the 2026 Commonwealth Games took place at the SEC Armadillo on 30 July 2026. New Zealand's David Liti won the gold medal ahead of Lovepreet Singh from India who took silver with Andrew Griffiths of England claiming the bronze.

== Qualification ==
A total of 176 weightlifters (88 per gender) qualify to compete at the Games. Nations may earn one quota per weight class, allocated as follows:

- Automatic Qualification – Host CGA (1 per event)
- Direct Qualification – 2025 Commonwealth Weightlifting Champions (1 per event)
- IWF Commonwealth Ranking List (Ranking Period: 01 June 2025 – 18 May 2026) (8 per event)
- Bipartite Invitation (1 per event)

The following lifters qualified in the Men's +110 kg class:

Means of qualification	Quotas	Qualified
Host Nation	~~1~~ 0	~~TBD (SCO)~~
2025 Commonwealth Championships	1	Sanele Mao (SAM)
IWF Commonwealth Rankings	~~8~~ 9	David Liti (NZL); Lovepreet Singh (IND); ~~Suamili Nanai (AUS)~~; Andrew Griffiths (ENG); James Wales (WAL); Sikoti Manumua Jr (TGA); Mohd Farris Haikal Kamarul (MAS); Omar Keshta (NIR)
Bipartite Invitation	1	Christoffel Reeders (RSA)
TOTAL	9	

Hosts Scotland declined their automatic entry in this weight class.

== Schedule ==
All times are British Summer Time (UTC+1)

Date	Time	Round
30 July 2026	18:30	Final

== Competition ==
Rank	Name	Country	Snatch (kg)				Clean & Jerk (kg)				Total	Notes
Rank	Name	Country	1	2	3	Result	1	2	3	Result	Total	Notes
1st place, gold medalist(s)	David Liti	New Zealand	156	166	~~176~~	166	207	223	—	223	389	GR
2nd place, silver medalist(s)	Lovepreet Singh	India	168	173	176	176 GR	205	212	~~217~~	212	388	
3rd place, bronze medalist(s)	Andrew Griffiths	England	160	165	~~170~~	165	186	191	~~196~~	191	356	
4	James Wales	Wales	140	145	~~150~~	145	~~190~~	~~191~~	191	191	336	
5	Sikoti Manumua Jr	Tonga	140	145	~~150~~	145	~~175~~	177	185	185	330	
6	Mohd Farris Haikal Kamarul	Malaysia	~~140~~	~~140~~	142	142	180	~~186~~	—	180	322	
7	Omar Keshta	Northern Ireland	137	142	~~145~~	142	177	~~183~~	~~183~~	177	319	
8	Christoffel Reeders	South Africa	135	140	~~145~~	140	163	~~168~~	~~170~~	163	303	
–	Sanele Mao	Samoa	~~175~~	~~175~~	~~175~~	NM	—	—	—	―	DNF	DNF
