= Hu Dandan =

Chinese Paralympic powerlifter

Personal information
- Nationality: Chinese
- Born: 10 March 1989 (age 37) Xuzhou, China

Sport
- Sport: powerlifting
Medal record
Powerlifting
Representing China
Summer Paralympics
Gold medal – first place	2016 Rio de Janeiro	Women's 45 kg
Gold medal – first place	2020 Tokyo	Women's 50 kg
World Championships
Silver medal – second place	2019 Nur-Sultan	Women's 50 kg
Asian Para Games
Gold medal – first place	2014 Incheon	Women's 45 kg

Hu Dandan (born 10 March 1989 in Xuzhou) is a Chinese powerlifter and former wheelchair tennis player. She won the gold medal at the women's 45 kg event at the 2016 Summer Paralympics, with 107 kilograms. She won the gold medal at the women's 50 kg event at the 2020 Summer Paralympics, with 120 kilograms.
