= Brunei at the Commonwealth Games =

- CG code: BRU
- CGA: Brunei Darussalam National Olympic Council
- Website: bruneiolympic.org
- Medals: Gold 0 Silver 0 Bronze 0 Total 0

Commonwealth Games appearances (overview)
- 1990; 1994; 1998; 2002; 2006; 2010; 2014; 2018; 2022; 2026; 2030

Brunei or Brunei Darussalam in full joined the Commonwealth of Nations immediately after gaining its independence on 1 January 1984. It has competed in every Commonwealth Games since the 1990 Commonwealth Games in Auckland, New Zealand. Brunei has never won a medal.

== Medal tally ==
	(gold)	(silver)	(bronze)	Total
Brunei	0	0	0	0
