= Brunei at the 2022 Commonwealth Games =

- Flag of Brunei
- CG code: BRU
- CGA: Brunei Darussalam National Olympic Council
- Website: bruneiolympic.org

in Birmingham, England 28 July 2022 – 8 August 2022
- Competitors: 7 (5 men and 2 women) in 2 sports
- Medals: Gold 0 Silver 0 Bronze 0 Total 0

Commonwealth Games appearances (overview)
- 1990; 1994; 1998; 2002; 2006; 2010; 2014; 2018; 2022; 2026; 2030

Brunei Darussalam was represented at the 2022 Commonwealth Games in Birmingham, England, United Kingdom by the Brunei Darussalam National Olympic Council.

In total, seven athletes including five men and two women represented Brunei Darussalam in two different sports including lawn bowls and weightlifting.

== Competitors ==
In total, seven athletes represented Brunei Darussalam at the 2022 Commonwealth Games in Birmingham, England, United Kingdom across two different sports.

Sport	Men	Women	Total
Lawn bowls	4	2	6
Weightlifting	1	0	1
Total	5	2	7

== Lawn bowls ==
In total, six Bruneian athletes participated in the lawn bowls events – Haji Osman Haji Yahya, Bahren Abdul Rahman, Haji Amli Haji Gafar and Mohd Hazmi HJ Idris in the men's fours and Norafizah Matossen and Esmawandy Brahim in the women's pairs.

The lawn bowls events took place at Victoria Park in Leamington Spa between 29 July and 6 August 2022.

Brunei's bowlers in the men's fours lost their three matches against Malaysia, Wales and Norfolk Island in the group stage and were eliminated, finishing bottom of their group. In the women's pairs, Matossen and Brahim followed up a defeat in their opening match against Australia with a win against Canada in their second match. However, they were eliminated after losing to Wales in their final group match.

Athlete	Event	Group Stage				Quarterfinal	Semifinal	Final / BM	
Athlete	Event	Opposition Score	Opposition Score	Opposition Score	Rank	Opposition Score	Opposition Score	Opposition Score	Rank
Haji Osman Haji Yahya; Bahren Abdul Rahman; Haji Amli Haji Gafar; Mohd Hazmi HJ Idris	Men's Fours	Malaysia; L 8 - 21	Wales; L 2 - 28	Norfolk Island; L 4 - 17	4	did not advance			
Norafizah Matossen; Esmawandy Brahim	Women's Pairs	Australia; L 14 - 24	Canada; W 15 - 12	Wales; L 8 - 27	3	did not advance			

== Weightlifting ==
In total, one Bruneian athlete participated in the weightlifting events – Nashrul Abu Bakar in the men's –61 kg category.

The weightlifting events took place at the National Exhibition Centre (NEC) in Marston Green between 30 July and 3 August 2022.

Abu Bakar qualified for the −61 kg category by virtue of his position in the International Weightlifting Federation Commonwealth Ranking List at 9 March 2022. The −61 kg took place on 30 July 2022. Abu Bakar lifted 95 kg (snatch) and 132 kg (clean and jerk) for a combined score of 127 kg which placed him sixth in the overall rankings.

Athlete	Event	Weight lifted		Total	Rank
Athlete	Event	Snatch	Clean & jerk	Total	Rank
Nashrul Abu Bakar	Men's –61 kg	95	132	227	6
