= Bonnie Bunyau Gustin =

Malaysian Paralympic powerlifter (born 1999)

Bonnie Bunyau Gustin JBK
Personal information
- Nickname: Bonnie
- Born: Bonnie Bunyau anak Gustin; 3 June 1999 (age 27) Serian, Sarawak, Malaysia
- Height: 132 cm (4 ft 4 in)

Sport
- Country: Malaysia
- Sport: Para powerlifting
- Disability: Short stature
- Coached by: Jamil Adam
Medal record
Men's powerlifting
Representing Malaysia
Paralympic Games
| Gold medal – first place | 2024 Paris | 72 kg |
| Gold medal – first place | 2020 Tokyo | 72 kg |
Commonwealth Games
| Gold medal – first place | 2022 Birmingham | Men's lightweight |
| Bronze medal – third place | 2026 Glasgow | Men's lightweight |
World Championships
| Gold medal – first place | 2019 Nur-Sultan | 65 kg |
| Gold medal – first place | 2021 Tbilisi | 72 kg |
| Gold medal – first place | 2023 Dubai | 72 kg |
World Para Powerlifting World Cup
| Gold medal – first place | 2021 Dubai | 72 kg |
| Gold medal – first place | 2021 Bangkok | 72 kg |
| Gold medal – first place | 2024 Dubai | 72 kg |
Asia Oceania Open Championships
| Gold medal – first place | 2022 Pyeongtaek | 72 kg |
Asian Para Games
| Gold medal – first place | 2022 Hangzhou | 72 kg |
| Silver medal – second place | 2018 Jakarta | 65 kg |

Bonnie Bunyau anak Gustin KMN JBK (born 3 June 1999) is a Malaysian powerlifter. He won Malaysia's first ever gold medal in the sport in the men's 72 kg event at the 2020 Summer Paralympics in Tokyo and again at the 2024 Summer Paralympics in Paris whilst breaking his own world record for men's 72 kg.

== Early and personal life ==
Bonnie hails from Serian as well as Betong divisions, Sarawak and he is of mixed Bidayuh-Iban ancestry, two main Bumiputera native ethnic groups to the Malaysian state of Sarawak. His father, Gustin Jenang competed in Para powerlifting at the 2010 World Championships in Kuala Lumpur. While his older brother, Bryan Junancey Gustin has also participated in the sport at international level. Bonnie took up the sport at age 15.

== Career ==
He competed at the 2018 Commonwealth Games where he came 4th in the lightweight event. In 2020 Tokyo Paralympics Games, Bonnie was chosen as the Malaysian flag bearer at the opening ceremony. He then set a new Paralympic record of 228 kg and earned Malaysia's first gold medal of the Paralympics Games in powerlifting. A few months later, he won the gold medal in his event at the 2021 World Para Powerlifting Championships held in Tbilisi, Georgia. He also set a new world record of 230 kg in the men's 72 kg event at the 2021 World Para Powerlifting World Cup in Dubai. In 2022, he won the gold in the Men's Lightweight powerlifting event at the Birmingham 2022 Commonwealth Games. During the 2024 Paralympic Games held in Paris, he was once again chosen as the Malaysian contingent flag bearer at the opening ceremony. At the men's 72 kg powerlifting event that was held on 6 September, he broke his own Paralympic record of 228 kg and his own world record of 231 kg by successfully lifting 232 kg which earned him a second consecutive gold medal for himself as well as for Malaysia in the games. He won the bronze medal in the lightweight powerlifting competition at the 2026 Commonwealth Games.

== Honours ==
=== Honours of Malaysia ===
- Malaysia
  - Officer of the Order of the Defender of the Realm (KMN) (2026)
- Sarawak
  - Companion of the Order of the Star of Hornbill Sarawak (JBK) (2022)
  - Gold Medal of the Sarawak Independence Diamond Jubilee Medal (2024)
