= Brunei at the 2006 Commonwealth Games =

- CGF code: BRU
- CGA: Brunei Darussalam National Olympic Council
- Website: bruneiolympic.org

in Melbourne, Australia
- Flag bearers: Opening: Closing:
- Medals: Gold 0 Silver 0 Bronze 0 Total 0

Commonwealth Games appearances (overview)
- 1990; 1994; 1998; 2002; 2006; 2010; 2014; 2018; 2022; 2026; 2030

Brunei Darussalam CGA logo

Brunei sent a Lawn Bowls team to the 2006 Commonwealth Games in Melbourne. It did not win any medals at the games.

== Medals ==
	(gold)	(silver)	(bronze)	Total
Brunei Darussalam	0	0	0	0
