= Matthew Harding (powerlifter) =

British paralympic powerlifter and swimmer

Matt Harding
Personal information
- Full name: Matthew Harding
- Born: 15 July 1999 (age 27) The Wirral, England

Sport
- Country: United Kingdom
- Sport: Powerlifting; Swimming
Medal record
Powerlifting
Representing Great Britain
European Championships
| Gold medal – first place | 2022 Tbilisi | 72 kg |
Representing England
Commonwealth Games
| Silver medal – second place | 2026 Glasgow | Heavyweight |

Matthew Harding (born 15 July 1999) is a British paralympic powerlifter and swimmer. He competed at the 2026 Commonwealth Games, winning the silver medal in men's heavyweight event. He previously competed in the men's 80 kg event at the 2024 Summer Paralympics.
