= Para powerlifting at the 2022 Commonwealth Games – Women's lightweight =

Para powerlifting – Women's lightweight at the 2022 Commonwealth Games
- Venue: National Exhibition Centre
- Dates: 4 August
- Competitors: 8 from 6 nations
- Winning points: 102.2

Medalists
gold medal	Zoe Newson	England
silver medal	Olivia Broome	England
bronze medal	Hellen Kariuki	Kenya

The Women's lightweight powerlifting event at the 2022 Commonwealth Games took place at the National Exhibition Centre on 4 August 2022.

== Schedule ==
All times are British Summer Time (UTC+1)

Date	Time	Round
Saturday 4 August 2022	15:00	Final

== Result ==
Rank	Athlete	Body weight	#1	#2	#3	Result
1st place, gold medalist(s)	Zoe Newson (ENG)	40.80	97	99	101	102.2
2nd place, silver medalist(s)	Olivia Broome (ENG)	53.80	105	109	111	100.0
3rd place, bronze medalist(s)	Hellen Kariuki (KEN)	40.50	95	97	~~99~~	98.5
4	Manpreet Kaur (IND)	40.30	87	88	~~90~~	89.6
5	Sakina Khatun (IND)	44.60	~~90~~	90	~~93~~	87.5
6	Suzanne Menye Meto (CMR)	49.00	~~80~~	~~80~~	86	80.3
7	Nur'Aini Mohamad Yasli (SGP)	46.20	70	74	78	74.7
8	Kimberley Dean (IOM)	58.20	80	84	~~87~~	73.7
	Onyinyechi Mark (NGR)	56.80	—			DSQ
	Latifat Tijani (NGR)	43.80	—			DSQ
