= Powerlifting at the 2020 Summer Paralympics – Women's 50 kg =

Powerlifting – Women's 50 kg at the XVI Paralympic Games
- Venue: Tokyo International Forum
- Date: 27 August 2021
- Competitors: 9 from 9 nations

Medalists
1st place, gold medalist(s)		Hu Dandan	China
2nd place, silver medalist(s)		Rehab Ahmed	Egypt
3rd place, bronze medalist(s)		Olivia Broome	Great Britain

The women's 50 kg powerlifting event at the 2020 Summer Paralympics was contested on 27 August at Tokyo International Forum.

== Records ==
There are twenty powerlifting events, corresponding to ten weight classes each for men and women. Prior to this competition, the existing world and Paralympic records were as follows.

World Record	Esther Oyema (NGR)	131.0 kg	Gold Coast, Australia	10 April 2018
Paralympic Record	Lidiia Soloviova (UKR)	107.0 kg	Rio de Janeiro, Brazil	10 September 2016

== Results ==
Rank	Name	Body weight (kg)	Attempts (kg)				Result (kg)
Rank	Name	Body weight (kg)	1	2	3	4	Result (kg)
1st place, gold medalist(s)	Hu Dandan (CHN)	49.27	105	112	120	–	120
2nd place, silver medalist(s)	Rehab Ahmed (EGY)	49.87	117	120 PR	~~121~~	–	120
3rd place, bronze medalist(s)	Olivia Broome (GBR)	49.53	106	107	~~109~~	–	107
4	Lidiia Soloviova (UKR)	48.49	104	106	~~108~~	–	106
5	Sakina Khatun (IND)	47.01	90	~~93~~	93	–	93
6	Loida Zabala Ollero (ESP)	49.25	93	~~97~~	~~97~~	–	93
7	Gulbanu Abdykhalykova (KAZ)	49.70	70	76	~~80~~	–	76
8	Halima Lemtakhem (MAR)	48.68	75	~~80~~	~~80~~	–	75
	Mayra Alejandra Hernández Godínez (MEX)	48.37	~~82~~	~~82~~	~~85~~	–	–
