= Brunei at the 2026 Commonwealth Games =

- Flag of Brunei
- CG code: BRU
- CGA: Brunei Darussalam National Olympic Council
- Website: bruneiolympic.org

in Glasgow, Scotland 23 July 2026 – 2 August 2026
- Competitors: 6 in 3 sports
- Flag bearer: Joel Ling
- Baton bearer: Sharmeen Mohammad Mharvin
- Medals: Gold 0 Silver 0 Bronze 0 Total 0

Commonwealth Games appearances (overview)
- 1990; 1994; 1998; 2002; 2006; 2010; 2014; 2018; 2022; 2026; 2030

Brunei was represented at the 2026 Commonwealth Games in Glasgow, Scotland by the Brunei Darussalam National Olympic Council. Glasgow 2026 marked the 10th occasion that Brunei had competed at the Commonwealth Games following its debut at the 1990 Commonwealth Games in Auckland, New Zealand.

In total, six athletes including three men and three women represented Brunei in three different sports including athletics, swimming and weightlifting.

== Background ==
In the run-up to the games, the King's Baton Relay stopped in Brunei between 6 and 11 November 2025 as part of the Asian leg of the relay. Unlike previous games, each Commonwealth Games Association received an individual baton crafted in Glasgow which they were permitted to customise to reflect local culture.

The 2026 Commonwealth Games marked Brunei's 10th participation at the games, after making its debut at the 1990 Commonwealth Games in Auckland, New Zealand.

=== Opening ceremony ===
Swimmer Joel Ling was selected as Brunei's flagbearer for the opening ceremony and fellow swimmer Sharmeen Mohammad Mharvin was selected as the baton bearer.

== Competitors ==
In total, six athletes represented Brunei at the 2026 Commonwealth Games in Glasgow, Scotland across three different sports.

Sport	Men	Women	Total
Athletics	1	1	2
Swimming	1	2	3
Weightlifting	1	0	1
Total	3	3	6

== Athletics ==
In total, two Bruneian athletes participated in the athletics events – Md Nazul Putera Faeiz Firdaous and Nur Mukhlis.

Athlete	Event	Round one		Semifinal		Final	
Athlete	Event	Result	Rank	Result	Rank	Result	Rank
Md Nazul Putera Faeiz Firdaous	Men's 100 m	10.81	6	Did not advance			
Nur Mukhlis	Women's 100 m	13.46	5	Did not advance			

== Swimming ==
In total, three Bruneian athletes participated in the swimming events – Joel Ling, Hayley Wong and Sharmeen Mohammad Mharvin.

Athlete	Event	Heat		Semifinal		Final	
Athlete	Event	Time	Rank	Time	Rank	Time	Rank
Joel Ling	Men's 100 m backstroke	59.12	18	Did not advance			
Joel Ling	Men's 200 m backstroke	2:11.00	14	Did not advance			
Joel Ling	Men's 100 m freestyle	53.69	48	Did not advance			
Hayley Wong	Women's 50 m freestyle	27.73	42	Did not advance			
Hayley Wong	Women's 100 m freestyle	1:00.75	41	Did not advance			
Hayley Wong	Women's 50 m butterfly	28.99	32	Did not advance			
Sharmeen Mohammad Mharvin	Women's 50 m freestyle	27.63	39	Did not advance			
Sharmeen Mohammad Mharvin	Women's 50 m backstroke	30.63	22	Did not advance			
Sharmeen Mohammad Mharvin	Women's 100 m backstroke	1:07.80	30	Did not advance			

== Weightlifting ==
In total, one Bruneian athlete participated in the weightlifting events – Nashrul Abu Bakarr.

Athlete	Event	Snatch (kg)		Clean & Jerk (kg)		Total (kg)	Rank
Athlete	Event	Result	Rank	Result	Rank	Total (kg)	Rank
Nashrul Abu Bakarr	65 kg	110	6	143	6	253	6
