= Weightlifting at the 2026 Commonwealth Games – Women's 53 kg =

Weightlifting – Women's 53 kg at the 2026 Commonwealth Games
- Venue: Scottish Event Campus
- Dates: 27 July 2026
- Competitors: 11 from 11 nations
- Winning total: 206 kg

Medalists
gold medal	Omolola Onome Didih	Nigeria
silver medal	Gyaneshwari Yadav	India
bronze medal	Rebeka Groulx	Canada

The Women's 53 kg weightlifting event at the 2026 Commonwealth Games took place at the SEC Armadillo, Glasgow on 27 July 2026. Nigeria's Omolola Onome Didih won the gold medal ahead of Gyaneshwari Yadav from India who took silver with Rebeka Groulx of Canada claiming the bronze.

== Qualification ==
A total of 176 weightlifters (88 per gender) qualify to compete at the Games. Nations may earn one quota per weight class, allocated as follows:

- Automatic Qualification – Host CGA (1 per event)
- Direct Qualification – 2025 Commonwealth Weightlifting Champions (1 per event)
- IWF Commonwealth Ranking List (Ranking Period: 01 June 2025 – 18 May 2026) (8 per event)
- Bipartite Invitation (1 per event)

The following lifters qualified in the Women's 53 kg class:

Means of qualification	Quotas	Qualified
Host Nation	~~1~~ 0	~~TBD (SCO)~~
2025 Commonwealth Championships	1	Omolola Onome Didih (NGR)
IWF Commonwealth Rankings	~~8~~ 9	Gyaneshwari Yadav (IND); Taljaard Johanni (RSA); Brenna Kean (AUS); Noorin Gulam (ENG); Jenly Tegu Wini (SOL); Rebekah Groulx (CAN); Kim Camilleri Laganà (MLT); Dika Toua (PNG); ~~Madaline Connolly (WAL)~~
Bipartite Invitation	1	Chua Jinn Linn (SGP)
TOTAL	10	

Hosts Scotland declined their automatic entry in this weight class.

== Schedule ==
All times are British Summer Time (UTC+1)

Date	Time	Round
27 July 2026	13:00	Final

== Competition ==
Rank	Athlete	Body weight (kg)	Snatch (kg)				Clean & Jerk (kg)				Total
Rank	Athlete	Body weight (kg)	1	2	3	Result	1	2	3	Result	Total
1st place, gold medalist(s)	Omolola Onome Didih (NGR)		85	90	93	93 CR, GR	105	110	113	113 CR, GR	206 CR, GR
2nd place, silver medalist(s)	Gyaneshwari Yadav (IND)		82	85	88	88	103	107	111	111	199
3rd place, bronze medalist(s)	Rebeka Groulx (CAN)		78	81	83	83	95	~~99~~	~~99~~	95	178
4	Johanni Taljaard (RSA)		~~75~~	75	78	78	~~97~~	97	~~101~~	97	175
5	Jenly Tegu Wini (SOL)		~~74~~	74	~~77~~	74	95	~~98~~	98	98	172
6	Chua Jiin-Linn (SGP)		71	~~74~~	74	74	~~93~~	94	~~96~~	94	168
7	Noorin Gulam (ENG)		73	75	~~77~~	75	92	~~95~~	~~95~~	92	167
8	Kim Camilleri Laganà (MLT)		70	~~72~~	73	73	90	93	~~96~~	93	166
—	Brenna Kean (AUS)		~~73~~	73	~~75~~	73	—	—	—	—	DNF
—	Dika Toua (PNG)		~~73~~	~~73~~	~~73~~	—	—	—	—	—	DNF
