= Nagrota Bagwan =

- town
- Location in Himachal Pradesh, India Nagrota Bagwan (India)
- Coordinates: 32.108°N 76.378°E
- Country: India
- State: Himachal Pradesh
- District: Kangra
- Elevation: 870 m (2,850 ft)

Population (2011)
  - Total: 5,900
  - Rank: 27

Languages
  - Official: Hindi
  - Native: Kangri
- Time zone: UTC+5:30 (IST)
- Postal code: 176047
- Vehicle registration: HP 94

Nagrota Bagwan is a town and a municipal council in Kangra district in the Indian state of Himachal Pradesh. It is in the Kangra valley in the Dhauladhar Mountain Range.

== Demographics ==
As of 2011 India census, Nagrota Bagwan had a population of 5900 of which 3,001 are males while 2,899 are females as per report released by Census India 2011. It ranks 27th in all the states. Males constitute 50.86% of the population and females 49.14%. Nagrota Bagwan has an average literacy rate of 91.76%, higher than the national average of 74%, male literacy is 93.59%, and female literacy is 87.87%.

Nagrota Bagwan Tehsil is the most densely populated tehsil in Himachal with 809 persons per km^{2}.

== Transportation ==
Nagrota Railway station is one of the major stations in the Kangra Valley Railways. Kangra Airport is 18 km from the main town.

ISBT Nagrota Bagwan, is one of the HRTC depot and major Transportation centre across the region . You can get the buses to other major cities in Himachal Pradesh like Dharamshala , Kangra , Shimla or even outside Himachal like Amritsar , Chandigarh , Delhi etc.
