= Para powerlifting at the 2026 Commonwealth Games – Men's heavyweight =

Para powerlifting – Men's heavyweight at the 2026 Commonwealth Games
- Venue: SEC Centre
- Dates: 25 July 2026
- Competitors: 11 from 8 nations
- Winning points: 132.8

Medalists
gold medal	Riluwan Idris	Nigeria
silver medal	Matthew Harding	England
bronze medal	Jhandu Kumar	India

The Men's heavyweight powerlifting event at the 2026 Commonwealth Games will take place at the SEC Centre on 25 July 2026.

== Schedule ==
All times are British Summer Time (UTC+1)

Date	Time	Round
Friday 24 July 2026	19:55	Final

== Result ==
Rank	Athlete	Group	Body weight	#1	#2	#3	Result
1st place, gold medalist(s)	Riluwan Idris (NGR)	A	86.0	200	208	~~212~~	132.8
2nd place, silver medalist(s)	Matthew Harding (ENG)	A	80.0	195	199	~~202~~	131
3rd place, bronze medalist(s)	Jhandu Kumar (IND)	B	72.4	181	190	~~196~~	130.9
4	Nicodemus Moses (MAS)	A	100.2	~~195~~	195	200	120.3
5	Dennis Mbaziira (UGA)	B	87.5	~~178~~	178	180	114.1
6	Sudhir Singh (IND)	A	91.2	182	183	~~211~~	114.1
7	Tahiru Haruna (GHA)	A	153.3	~~212~~	212	~~218~~	112
8	Ben Wright (AUS)	B	84.1	172	~~177~~	~~178~~	110.9
9	Alfie Benanze (IOM)	B	104.8	163	170	172	110.9
—	Bryan Junency Gustin (MAS)	A	81.6	~~196~~	~~196~~	~~201~~	DNF
—	Cameron Wittington (AUS)	B	117.2	~~175~~	~~175~~	~~175~~	DNF
