= Solomon Islands at the 2026 Commonwealth Games =

- Flag of Solomon Islands
- CG code: SOL
- CGA: National Olympic Committee of Solomon Islands
- Website: www.nocsi.org.sb

in Glasgow, Scotland 23 July 2026 – 2 August 2026
- Competitors: 13 in 5 sports
- Flag bearer: Maximilian Makana
- Baton bearer: Moffet Tolomae
- Medals: Gold 0 Silver 0 Bronze 0 Total 0

Commonwealth Games appearances (overview)
- 1982; 1986; 1990; 1994; 1998; 2002; 2006; 2010; 2014; 2018; 2022; 2026; 2030

Solomon Islands competed at the 2026 Commonwealth Games in Glasgow, Scotland. This marked Solomon Islands' 11th participation at the games, after making its debut at the 1982 Commonwealth Games.

The King's Baton relay stopped in the Solomon Islands in January 2026. Athletes who won medals would have been awarded with cash prizes.

The Solomon Islands team consisted of 13 athletes competing in five sports. Ten of the athletes were men, with three women rounding out the team. The Minister for Home Affairs in Solomon Islands Manasseh Maelanga was also part of the delegation.

Boxer Maximilian Makana was the country's flagbearer during the opening ceremony. Meanwhile, para powerlifter Moffet Tolomae was the baton bearer during the opening ceremony.

== Competitors ==
The following is the list of number of competitors participating at the Games per sport/discipline.

Sport		Men	Women	Total
Athletics		3	0	3
Boxing		4	0	4
Judo		1	1	2
Swimming		1	1	2
Weightlifting	Para powerlifting	1	0	1
Weightlifting	Weightlifting	0	1	1
Total		10	3	13

== Athletics ==
The Solomon Islands entered male three athletes.

Men

Athlete	Event	Heat		Semifinal		Final	
Athlete	Event	Result	Rank	Result	Rank	Result	Rank
Stephen Rahuasi	800 m	2:00.16	8	Did not advance			
Geejay Junior	5000 m	—N/a				16:32.72	25
Leony Pusua	5000 m	—N/a				16:16.18 PB	24

== Boxing ==
The Solomon Islands entered four male boxers.

Men

Athlete	Event	Preliminaries	Preliminaries	Quarterfinal	Semifinal	Final	
Athlete	Event	Opposition Result	Opposition Result	Opposition Result	Opposition Result	Opposition Result	Rank
Clinton Tetekana	55 kg	Hossain (BAN); L RSC	Did not advance				
Max Makana	60 kg	Jayantha (SRI); L 0–5	Did not advance				
Osward Talaka	70 kg	Bye	Hield (ZAM); L 1–3	Did not advance			
Lio Dicks	80 kg	Micock (SEY); L 0–5	Did not advance				

== Judo ==
The Solomon Islands entered two judoka, one per gender.

Athlete	Event	Round of 32	Round of 16	Quarterfinals	Semifinals	Repechage	Final/BM	
Athlete	Event	Opposition Result	Opposition Result	Opposition Result	Opposition Result	Opposition Result	Opposition Result	Rank
Alister Sukhamana	Men's 73 kg	Bye	Njie (GAM); L 000–100	Did not advance				
Georgina Samo George	Women's 63 kg	—N/a	Ekuta (NGR); L 000–100	Did not advance				

== Swimming ==
The Solomon Islands entered two swimmers, one per gender.

Athlete	Event	Heat		Semifinal		Final	
Athlete	Event	Time	Rank	Time	Rank	Time	Rank
Bijay Ghusa Garry	Men's 50 m freestyle	DNS		Did not advance			
Bijay Ghusa Garry	Men's 50 m butterfly	29.56	65	Did not advance			
Loise Bently	Women's 50 m freestyle	33.98	64	Did not advance			
Loise Bently	Women's 50 m breaststroke	50.85	30	Did not advance			

== Weightlifting ==
The Solomon Islands qualified one female weightlifter. Jenly Wini competed in her fifth Commonwealth Games. Wini would go onto finish in fifth spot, just of the podium.

Athlete	Event	Snatch (kg)		Clean & Jerk (kg)		Total (kg)	Rank
Athlete	Event	Result	Rank	Result	Rank	Total (kg)	Rank
Jenly Wini	Women's 53 kg	74	6	98	3	172	5

=== Para powerlifting ===
Solomon Islands qualified one male para powerlifter.

Athlete	Event	Lift (kg)	Points	Rank
Moffet Tolomae	Men's lightweight	120	94.0	11
