= Weightlifting at the 2026 Commonwealth Games – Women's 58 kg =

Weightlifting – Women's 58 kg at the 2026 Commonwealth Games
- Venue: Scottish Event Campus
- Dates: 27 July 2026
- Competitors: 10 from 10 nations
- Winning total: 229 kg GR

Medalists
gold medal	Rafiatu Lawal	Nigeria
silver medal	Ann-Sophie Taschereau	Canada
bronze medal	Bindyarani Devi	India

The Women's 58 kg weightlifting event at the 2026 Commonwealth Games took place at the Commonwealth Arena, Glasgow on 27 July 2026. Nigeria's Rafiatu Lawal won the gold medal ahead of Ann-Sophie Taschereau from Canada who took silver with Bindyarani Devi of India claiming the bronze.

== Qualification ==
A total of 176 weightlifters (88 per gender) qualify to compete at the Games. Nations may earn one quota per weight class, allocated as follows:

- Automatic Qualification – Host CGA (1 per event)
- Direct Qualification – 2025 Commonwealth Weightlifting Champions (1 per event)
- IWF Commonwealth Ranking List (Ranking Period: 01 June 2025 – 18 May 2026) (8 per event)
- Bipartite Invitation (1 per event)

Current Commonwealth champion, Kiana Elliott, opted to compete in another weight classification, and was replaced by the next eligible ranked lifter, who in her absence was her compatriot Ashley Kolomoisky.

The following lifters qualified in the Women's 58 kg class:

Means of qualification	Quotas	Qualified
Host Nation	~~1~~ 0	~~TBD (SCO)~~
2025 Commonwealth Championships	~~1~~	~~Kiana Elliott (AUS)~~
IWF Commonwealth Rankings	~~8~~ ~~9~~ 10	Rafiatu Folashade Lawal (NGR); Ann-Sophie Taschereau (CAN); Bindyarani Devi Sorokhaibam (IND); Eliza Pratt (ENG); Catrin Haf Jones (WAL); Ashley Kolomoisky (AUS); Anneke Spies Burger (RSA); ~~Elizabeth Granger (NZL)~~; Dimitra Ioannou (CYP); Anoni Taulua (SAM)
Bipartite Invitation	1	Yayra Akos Agozi (GHA)
Reallocation	1	Margaret Bless Harris (NRU)
TOTAL	11	

Hosts Scotland declined their automatic entry in this weight class.

== Schedule ==
All times are British Summer Time (UTC+1)

Date	Time	Round
27 July 2026	18:30	Final

== Competition ==
Yayra Agozi of Ghana was scheduled to compete but did not attempt any lifts.

Rank	Athlete	Body weight (kg)	Snatch (kg)				Clean & Jerk (kg)				Total
Rank	Athlete	Body weight (kg)	1	2	3	Result	1	2	3	Result	Total
1st place, gold medalist(s)	Rafiatu Lawal (NGR)		95	100	103	103 CR, GR	117	122	126	126 GR	229 GR
2nd place, silver medalist(s)	Ann-Sophie Taschereau (CAN)		~~94~~	~~94~~	94	94	111	115	121	121	215
3rd place, bronze medalist(s)	Bindyarani Devi (IND)		83	85	87	87	~~110~~	112	~~116~~	112	199
4	Eliza Pratt (ENG)		~~84~~	84	87	87	106	109	~~113~~	109	196
5	Ashley Kolomoisky (AUS)		78	81	84	84	100	104	~~109~~	104	188
6	Catrin Haf Jones (WAL)		~~82~~	82	~~84~~	82	106	~~109~~	~~115~~	106	188
7	Anneke Spies-Burger (RSA)		77	~~80~~	~~80~~	77	98	101	~~103~~	101	178
8	Anoni Faumui (SAM)		75	79	82	82	~~95~~	~~95~~	95	95	177
9	Dimitra Ioannou (CYP)		65	70	~~75~~	70	85	90	~~95~~	90	160
10	Margaret Bless Harris (NRU)		~~60~~	65	~~70~~	65	75	~~80~~	~~80~~	75	140
