= Para powerlifting at the 2026 Commonwealth Games – Women's lightweight =

Para powerlifting – Women's lightweight at the 2026 Commonwealth Games
- Venue: SEC Centre
- Dates: 24 July 2026
- Competitors: 12 from 7 nations
- Winning points: 119.0

Medalists
gold medal	Esther Nworgu	Nigeria
silver medal	Esther Oyema	Nigeria
bronze medal	Olivia Broome	England

The Women's lightweight powerlifting event at the 2026 Commonwealth Games took place at the SEC Centre on 24 July 2026.

== Schedule ==
All times are British Summer Time (UTC+1)

Date	Time	Round
Friday 24 July 2026	16:30	Final

== Result ==
Rank	Athlete	Pool	Body weight	#1	#2	#3	Result
1st place, gold medalist(s)	Esther Nworgu (NGR)	A	45.1	118	123	~~124~~	119.0
2nd place, silver medalist(s)	Esther Oyema (NGR)	A	50.3	~~125~~	125	~~127~~	115.5
3rd place, bronze medalist(s)	Olivia Broome (ENG)	A	54.7	115	119	~~124~~	106.6
4	Hellen Wawira (KEN)	A	44.2	107	~~109~~	~~109~~	104.4
5	Charlotte McGuinness (ENG)	A	57.4	105	109	110	96.9
6	Jaspreet Kaur (IND)	B	45.4	95	~~99~~	100	96.4
7	Suman Devi (IND)	A	56.9	100	~~103~~	~~103~~	88.4
8	Suzanne Menye M'eto (CMR)	B	48.9	~~90~~	97	94	87.9
9	Rahab Ngare (KEN)	B	44.5	~~65~~	67	73	71.0
10	Jade Pritchard (AUS)	B	58.0	66	69	~~72~~	60.6
11	Natasha Price (AUS)	B	60.4	63	66	~~68~~	57.2
12	Janet Nakayobyo (UGA)	B	60.9	62	63	~~64~~	54.4
