= Para powerlifting at the 2026 Commonwealth Games – Men's lightweight =

Para powerlifting – Men's lightweight at the 2026 Commonwealth Games
- Venue: SEC Centre
- Dates: 24 July 2026
- Competitors: 12 from 10 nations
- Winning points: 153.9

Medalists
gold medal	Mark Swan	England
silver medal	Roland Ezuruike	Nigeria
bronze medal	Bonnie Bunyau Gustin	Malaysia

The Men's lightweight powerlifting event at the 2026 Commonwealth Games will take place at the SEC Centre on 4 July 2026.

== Schedule ==
All times are British Summer Time (UTC+1)

Date	Time	Round
Friday 24 July 2026	16:30	Final

== Result ==
Rank	Athlete	Pool	Body weight	#1	#2	#3	Result
1st place, gold medalist(s)	Mark Swan (ENG)	A	71.5	212	222	~~232~~	153.9
2nd place, silver medalist(s)	Roland Ezuruike (NGR)	A	50.8	178	185	~~190~~	153.9
3rd place, bronze medalist(s)	Bonnie Bunyau Gustin (MAS)	A	70.6	210	220	~~230~~	153.5
4	Ashok Malik (IND)	A	66.4	195	200	~~205~~	143.8
5	Finlay Davidson (SCO)	B	48.8	156	161	166	141.4
6	Ibrahim Dauda (NGR)	A	57.1	172	177	180	140.1
7	Parmjeet Kumar (IND)	A	58.2	176	~~179~~	~~179~~	135.6
8	Ngungi Maringa (KEN)	B	53.3	157	~~160~~	~~163~~	127.0
9	Daniel Bos (AUS)	B	50.1	142	147	~~150~~	123.3
10	Balinga Manga (CMR)	B	68.7	145	147	~~150~~	103.9
11	Moffat Tolomae (SOL)	B	48.5	100	105	110	94.0
12	Nick Mercieca (MLT)	B	58.1	112	116	120	92.5
