= Erra Deexitha =

Indian weightlifter (born 1997)

Erra Deexitha (born 25 September 1997) is an Indian weightlifter from Mahabubabad, Telangana, who competes in the 59 kg weight class.

== Early life ==
Her father was an employee of the State Electricity Department and her mother is a home maker. Deexitha started weightlifting at the age of nine in 2006 at a local gymnasium. After joining the Sports Hostel she learnt the basics from coaches SA Singh and Olympian P Manikayala Rao. She did her BA at Nizam College, Hyderabad. Currently she is ranked 8th in the 53Kg class in the World Rankings.

== Tournaments ==
- 2012: Gold at the Commonwealth Youth Championship (53kg)
- 2012: IWF Youth Championship (53kg)
- 2013: Commonwealth Youth Championship; (53kg)
- 2014: Asian Youth Championship; (53kg)
- November 2016: FISU World University Championships, Mexico representing Osmania University; (58kg)
- 2017: Asian Junior Championships, Kathmandu, Nepal; (58kg)
- 2017: Gold at Commonwealth Junior Championship at Gold Coast, Australia;
- 2018: Commonwealth Games, Silver;
- 2019: Commonwealth Weightlifting Championship, Bronze;
