= Ann-Sophie Taschereau =

Canadian weightlifter

Personal information
- Born: March 16, 2002 (age 24)

Sport
- Country: Canada
- Sport: Weightlifting
- Weight class: 58–59 kg (128–130 lb)
Medal record
Women's weightlifting
Representing Canada
Pan American Championships
Silver medal – second place	2026 Panama City	58 kg
Commonwealth Games
Silver medal – second place	2026 Glasgow	58 kg
Commonwealth Championships
Gold medal – first place	2024 Suva	59 kg

Ann-Sophie Taschereau (born March 16, 2002) is a Canadian weightlifter. She competed at the 2024 Commonwealth Weightlifting Championships, winning the gold medal in the women's 59 kg event. She also competed at the 2026 Commonwealth Games, winning the silver medal in the women's 58 kg event.
