= Latifat Tijani =

Nigerian powerlifter

Personal information
- Born: 8 November 1981 (age 44)
- Weight: 43 kg (95 lb)
Medal record
Women's Weightlifting
Representing Nigeria
Paralympic Games
Gold medal – first place	2020 Tokyo	Women's –45 kg
Silver medal – second place	2016 Rio de Janeiro	Women's –45 kg
African Games
Gold medal – first place	2015 Brazzaville	Women's –45 kg

Latifat Tijani (born 8 November 1981) is a Nigerian powerlifter. She won gold in the women's – 45 kg event at the 2015 African Games in Brazzaville, Republic of Congo. In 2016, she competed in the women's – 45 kg event at the 2016 Summer Paralympics, where she lifted 106 kg to win silver.

At the 2019 World Para Powerlifting Championships she won the bronze medal in the women's 45 kg event.
