= Mark Swan =

British Paralympic powerlifter (born 2001)

Personal information
- Born: 2 July 2001 (age 25) Seaham, County Durham, England

Sport
- Country: Great Britain
- Sport: Paralympic powerlifting
- Weight class: 65 kg
Medal record
Men's paralympic powerlifting
Representing Great Britain
Paralympic Games
Silver medal – second place	2024 Paris	65 kg
Representing England
Commonwealth Games
Gold medal – first place	2026 Glasgow	Lightweight
Silver medal – second place	2022 Birmingham	Lightweight

Mark Swan (born 2 July 2001) is a British Paralympic powerlifter. He won a silver medal representing Great Britain at the 2024 Summer Paralympics and a gold medal for England at the 2026 Commonwealth Games.

== Career ==
Swan represented England at the 2022 Commonwealth Games and won a silver medal in the lightweight powerlifting event.

Swan represented Great Britain at the 2024 Summer Paralympics and won a silver medal in the 65 kg powerlifting event.

Representing England, he won the gold medal in the lightweight powerlifting competition at the 2026 Commonwealth Games.
