= Zoe Newson =

British powerlifter (born 1992)

Personal information
- Born: 24 March 1992 (age 34) Ipswich, England

Sport
- Country: United Kingdom; England
- Sport: Powerlifting
- Event: 40kg
- Club: Suffolk Spartans
- Coached by: Louise Pennell and Daniel Collins

Achievements and titles
- Paralympic finals: 2012; 2016
- Personal best: 102kg lift
Medal record
Women's powerlifting
Representing Great Britain
Paralympic Games
Silver medal – second place	2024 Paris	–45 kg
Bronze medal – third place	2012 London	−40 kg
Bronze medal – third place	2016 Rio de Janeiro	−45 kg
World Championships
Silver medal – second place	2021 Tbilisi	−45 kg
Bronze medal – third place	2017 Mexico City	−45 kg
Representing England
Commonwealth Games
Gold medal – first place	2022 Birmingham	Lightweight
Bronze medal – third place	2018 Gold Coast	Lightweight

Zoe Newson (born 24 March 1992) is a British powerlifter. She is a one-time silver and two-time bronze medalist at the Summer Paralympics and she won the silver medal in her event at the 2021 World Para Powerlifting Championships.

In 2012 Newson posted a European record at the IPC Powerlifting British Championships and took bronze in the under 40 kg class for Great Britain at the 2012 Summer Paralympics in London.

== Career history ==
Newson was born in Ipswich in 1992 and was educated at East Bergholt High School. Newson, who was born with growth hormone deficiency, tried out powerlifting for the first time in 2006, joining the Suffolk Spartans club in Colchester in 2007. Newson entered a local competition in 2007, lifting near 40 kg, but by January 2008 she had improved this to 47.5 kg, taking second place at a Paralympic competition in Cardiff. In May Newson lifted a personal best of 60 kg and repeated this feat in June at the British Finals to make her British Champion in her class.

2009 saw Newson drop weight to take her into the under 40 kg class, and in Cardiff she lifted 70 kg to take first place. She bettered this again that summer with first place at both the World Dwarf Games and the British Finals, lifting 75 kg in both. In November she travelled to Bangalore to compete in the IWAS World Games, taking silver in both the junior and senior events. In 2010, she took first place again in Cardiff, now lifting 80 kg. Her progress continued throughout the year, lifting 85 kg, now double her own weight, at the British Finals and breaking the junior European record. In July Newson was invited to attend the IPC Powerlifting World Championships in Kuala Lumpur, finishing first in the junior event and fourth in the seniors. She finished the year by qualifying for the England team for the 2010 Commonwealth Games, her lift of 85 kg placing her just outside the medals in fourth place.

In 2011, she took first in Cardiff, the British Finals and the IWAS World Junior Games. She then took a break from competing to train in preparation for qualifying for the 2012 Summer Paralympics. With a personal best of 88 kg at Cardiff, Newson only entered the events that would ensure her position in the Great Britain team was secure. In February she qualified for the team taking the only position in the women's under 40 kg category. On 30 August, despite having her second lift chalked off, she equalled her personal best lifting 88 kg to take the bronze medal.

In 2021, she won the silver in her event at the 2021 World Para Powerlifting Championships held in Tbilisi, Georgia.

She competed at the 2022 Commonwealth Games where she won a gold medal in the women's lightweight event.
