= Weightlifting at the 2026 Commonwealth Games – Men's 79 kg =

Weightlifting – Men's 79 kg at the 2026 Commonwealth Games
- Venue: Scottish Event Campus
- Dates: 27 July 2026
- Competitors: 11 from 11 nations

Medalists
gold medal	Muhammad Erry Hidayat	Malaysia
silver medal	Ajaya Babu	India
bronze medal	Chris Murray	England

The Men's 79 kg weightlifting event at the 2026 Commonwealth Games will take place at the SEC Armadillo, Glasgow on 27 July 2026. Malaysia's Muhammad Erry Hidayat won the gold medal ahead of Ajaya Babu from India who took silver with Chris Murray of England claiming the bronze.

== Qualification ==
A total of 176 weightlifters (88 per gender) qualify to compete at the Games. Nations may earn one quota per weight class, allocated as follows:

- Automatic Qualification – Host CGA (1 per event)
- Direct Qualification – 2025 Commonwealth Weightlifting Champions (1 per event)
- IWF Commonwealth Ranking List (Ranking Period: 01 June 2025 – 18 May 2026) (8 per event)
- Bipartite Invitation (1 per event)

The following lifters qualified in the Men's 79 kg class:

Means of qualification	Quotas	Qualified
Host Nation	1	Iain Wilson (SCO)
2025 Commonwealth Championships	1	Ajaya Babu (IND)
IWF Commonwealth Rankings	8	Muhammad Erry Hidayat (MAS); Shad Darsigny (CAN); Adedapo Adeleke Opadeji (NGR); Loh Yuan Yee (SGP); Rory Scott (AUS); Chris Murray (ENG); Marco Mollo (NZL); Ruben Katoatau (KIR)
Bipartite Invitation	1	Jon-Antohein Philllips (RSA)
TOTAL	11	

== Schedule ==
All times are British Summer Time (UTC+1)

Date	Time	Round
July 2026	09:00	Final

== Competition ==
Rank	Athlete	Body weight (kg)	Snatch (kg)				Clean & Jerk (kg)				Total
Rank	Athlete	Body weight (kg)	1	2	3	Result	1	2	3	Result	Total
1st place, gold medalist(s)	Muhammad Erry Hidayat (MAS)		~~147~~	~~147~~	147	147	177	181	184	184 GR	331 GR
2nd place, silver medalist(s)	Ajaya Babu (IND)		145	~~149~~	149	149 GR	174	178	181	181	330
3rd place, bronze medalist(s)	Chris Murray (ENG)		141	145	148	148	169	~~174~~	177	177	325
4	Shad Darsigny (CAN)		~~140~~	140	~~145~~	140	~~167~~	167	175	175	315
5	Yuan Yee Loh (SGP)		~~136~~	136	~~140~~	136	~~167~~	167	~~172~~	167	303
6	Rory Scott (AUS)		130	135	~~140~~	135	165	~~170~~	~~170~~	165	300
7	Marco Mollo (NZL)		129	133	~~137~~	133	165	~~170~~	~~170~~	165	298
8	Iain Wilson (SCO)		~~120~~	120	125	125	150	~~155~~	156	156	281
DNF	Ruben Katoatau (KIR)		122	129	~~134~~	129	~~165~~	~~165~~	~~165~~	–	NM
DNF	Adedapo Opadeji (NGR)		~~135~~	135	~~140~~	135	–	–	–	–	DNF
DNF	Jon-Antohein Philllips (RSA)		119	~~124~~	~~124~~	119	~~166~~	~~167~~	~~167~~	–	NM
