= Ajaya Babu Valluri =

Indian weightlifter (born 2000)

Ajaya Babu
Personal information
- Full name: Valluri Ajaya Babu
- Born: 25 November 2004 (age 21) Kondavelagada, Andhra Pradesh, India

Sport
- Sport: Weightlifting
- Weight class: 79 kg
Medal record
Men's weightlifting
Representing India
Commonwealth Games
Silver medal – second place	2026 Glasgow	79 kg
Commonwealth Championships
Gold medal – first place	2024 Suva	81 kg
Gold medal – first place	2025 Ahmedabad	79 kg
Commonwealth Junior Championships
Gold medal – first place	2024 Suva	81 kg
Asian Youth & Junior Championships
Silver medal – second place	2024 Doha	81 kg

Valluri Ajaya Babu (born 25 November 2004) is an Indian weightlifter. He has won three gold medals in the Commonwealth Weightlifting Championships, and a silver medal in the 2024 Asian Youth & Junior Weightlifting Championships. He won the silver medal in the men's 79 kg category at the 2026 Commonwealth Games.

== Early life ==
Valluri Ajaya Babu was born on 25 November 2004 in Kondavelagada in Vizianagaram district of Andhra Pradesh. He was introduced to weightlifting at the age of 11, and initially began training under his father, Valluri Srinivasa Rao. Srinivasa Rao was a former international weightlifter, and coach, who had won a bronze medal in the 2010 Commonwealth Games. He later trained at the Sports Authority of India's National Centre of Excellence at Patiala.

== Career ==
In the Commonwealth Weightlifting Championships in Suva in September 2024, Ajaya Babu won the gold medal in both the junior and senior categories in the 81 kg weight class. He set a commonwealth record with a total lift of 326 kg (719 lb) including 146 kg (322 lb) in snatch and 179 kg (395 lb) in clean & jerk. In the 2024 Asian Youth & Junior Weightlifting Championships held in Doha in December 2024, he won a silver medal in snatch, with a lift of 147 kg (324 lb), in the 81 kg weight category. In the 2025 Commonwealth Weightlifting Championships at Ahmedabad, Ajaya Babu won the gold medal in the 79 kg category with a competition record lift of 335 kg (739 lb) including 152 kg (335 lb) in snatch and 183 kg (403 lb) in clean & jerk.

Ajaya Babu was part of the Indian contingent for the 2026 Commonwealth Games held in Glasgow. In the 79 kg event, he won the silver medal with a total lift of 330 kg (730 lb). In snatch, he cleared 145 kg (320 lb) in his first attempt, and lifted 149 kg (328 lb) in his third and final attempt to set a new Commonwealth Games record. In clean & jerk, he cleared 174 kg (384 lb) and 178 kg (392 lb) in his first two attempts respectively, before lifting 181 kg (399 lb) in his third and final attempt to briefly set a new Commonwealth Games record. However, he finished second after Muhammad Erry Hidayat lifted 184 kg (406 lb) in his final attempt.
