= Lovepreet Singh (weightlifter) =

Indian weightlifter (born 1997)

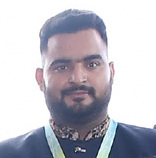
- Singh in 2022

Personal information
- Born: 6 September 1997 (age 28) Amritsar, Punjab, India
- Height: 1.82 m (6 ft 0 in)

Sport
- Sport: Weightlifting
- Event: +110 kg
Medal record
Men's weightlifting
Representing India
Commonwealth Games
Silver medal – second place	2026 Glasgow	+110kg
Bronze medal – third place	2022 Birmingham	109kg
Commonwealth Championships
Silver medal – second place	2021 Tashkent	109kg

Lovepreet Singh (born 6 September 1997) is an Indian weightlifter. He won the silver medal at the 2021 Commonwealth Championships, a bronze medal at the 2022 Commonwealth Games and a silver medal at the 2026 Commonwealth Games. In 2017, he won bronze at the Asian Youth Championships and gold at the Junior Commonwealth Championships in the 105 kg category. He works for the Indian Navy.
