= Riluwan Idris =

Nigerian para powerlifter

Sport
- Country: Nigeria
- Sport: Para powerlifting
Medal record
Men's para powerlifting
Representing Nigeria
Commonwealth Games
Gold medal – first place	2026 Glasgow	Heavyweight

Riluwan Idris is a Nigerian para powerlifter. He won a gold medal at the 2026 Commonwealth Games.

== Career ==
Idris competed at the 2026 Commonwealth Games and won a gold medal in the heavyweight event. He became Nigeria's first male Commonwealth Games gold medalist in para powerlifting.
