= Hellen Kariuki =

Kenyan Paralympic powerlifter (born 1992)

Personal information
- Full name: Hellen Wawira Kariuki
- Born: 15 April 1992 (age 34)

Sport
- Sport: Para powerlifting
Medal record
Representing Kenya
Commonwealth Games
Bronze medal – third place	2022 Birmingham	Lightweight

Hellen Wawira Kariuki (born 15 April 1992) is a Kenyan para powerlifter. She competed at the 2018 Commonwealth Games where she came 4th in the lightweight event. She won a bronze medal in the lightweight event at the 2022 Commonwealth Games.
