= Gyaneshwari Yadav =

Indian weightlifter (born 2003)

Personal information
- Born: 8 March 2003 (age 23) Bhodiya, Rajnandgaon district, Chhattisgarh, India

Sport
- Sport: Weightlifting
- Weight class: 53 kg
Medal record
Women's weightlifting
Representing India
Commonwealth Games
Silver medal – second place	2026 Glasgow	53 kg
Asian Championships
Bronze medal – third place	2026 Gandhinagar	53 kg

Gyaneshwari Yadav (born 8 March 2003) is an Indian weightlifter. In May 2026, she won a silver and bronze medal at the 2026 Asian Weightlifting Championships in Gandhinagar. In July 2026, she won the silver medal in the women's 53 kg category at the 2026 Commonwealth Games in Glasgow.

== Early and personal life ==
Gyaneshwari Yadav was born on 8 March 2003 in Bhodiya in Rajnandgaon district of Chhattisgarh. She is employed as an assistant Sub-inspector with the Chhattisgarh Police. She received the Gundadhur Samman award from the Government of Chhattisgarh in 2025.

== Career ==
In the 2024 World Weightlifting Championships at Manama, Yadav finished in fifth place in the 49 kg weight category with a total lift of 182 kg (401 lb) including 80 kg (180 lb) in snatch and 102 kg (225 lb) in clean & jerk. In the 2026 Asian Weightlifting Championships, held in Gandhinagar in May 2026, she won the silver medal in snatch and the overall bronze medal in the 53 kg weight category. She set a personal best of 194 kg (428 lb) including 88 kg (194 lb) in snatch and 106 kg (234 lb) in clean & jerk.

Yadav was part of the Indian contingent for the 2026 Commonwealth Games held in Glasgow. In the 53 kg event, she won the silver medal with a total lift of 199 kg (439 lb). In snatch, she cleared 82 kg (181 lb), 85 kg (187 lb), and 88 kg (194 lb) in her three attempts respectively. In clean & jerk, she cleared 103 kg (227 lb), 107 kg (236 lb), and 111 kg (245 lb) in her three attempts respectively. She briefly set Commonwealth Games Records in both snatch and clean & jerk with her lifts of 88 kg (194 lb) and 111 kg (245 lb) respectively, before both were claimed by the gold medal winner, Onome Omolola.
