= Esther Nworgu =

Nigerian powerlifter (born 2002

Personal information
- Born: 1 December 2002 (age 23)

Sport
- Country: Nigeria
- Sport: Powerlifting
- Weight class: 41 kg
Medal record
Women's powerlifting
Representing Nigeria
Paralympic Games
Silver medal – second place	2024 Paris	41 kg
Commonwealth Games
Gold medal – first place	2026 Glasgow	Lightweight

Esther Nworgu (born 1 December 2002) is a Nigerian powerlifter. She competed at the 2024 Summer Paralympics and won the silver medal in the women's 49 kg event. Nworgu won the gold medal in the lightweight powerlifting competition at the 2026 Commonwealth Games.
