= Muthupandi Raja =

Indian weightlifter (born 2000)

Raja Muthupandi
Personal information
- Born: 12 January 2000 (age 26) Kovilpatti, Tamil Nadu, India

Sport
- Sport: Weightlifting
- Weight class: 65 kg
Medal record
Men's weightlifting
Representing India
Commonwealth Games
Silver medal – second place	2026 Glasgow	65 kg
Commonwealth Championships
Silver medal – second place	2025 Ahmedabad	65 kg

Raja Muthupandi (born 12 January 2000) is an Indian weightlifter. He won the silver medal in the men's 65 kg category at the 2026 Commonwealth Games.

== Early life ==
Raja was born on 12 January 2000 in Kovilpatti in Thoothukudi district of Tamil Nadu. His father was a daily wage worker. Raja was introduced to weightlifting at the age of 12. In 2014, he started training at a training center run by the Sports Authority of India. He has been coached by Vijay Sharma since 2016. He is employed by the Indian Railways since 2018.

== Career ==
Raja was part of the Indian contingent for the 2018 Commonwealth Games held in Gold Coast, Queensland. In the 62 kg event, he finished sixth with a total lift of 266 kg (586 lb) including 116 kg (256 lb) in snatch and 150 kg (330 lb) in clean & jerk. He suffered a ligament tear in his right elbow during the 2019 Commonwealth Weightlifting Championships that required surgery.

Raja returned to competing in the 2021 National Championships, and won a bronze medal. However, he failed to qualify for the 2022 Commonwealth Games due to his third-place finish in the national event. In the 2024 National Championships, he won the gold medal and set several national records in the men's 61 kg category with a total lift of 289 kg (637 lb) including 124 kg (273 lb) in snatch and 165 kg (364 lb) in clean & jerk.

In the 2025 Commonwealth Weightlifting Championships at Ahmedabad, Raja won the silver medal in the 65 kg category with a personal best lift of 296 kg (653 lb). In the 2025 World Weightlifting Championships in Førde, Norway, he finished ninth with a total lift of 299 kg (659 lb). In the 2026 National Championships, he won the gold medal in the 65 kg category with a new national record of 302 kg (666 lb) including 130 kg (290 lb) in snatch and 172 kg (379 lb) in clean & jerk.

Raja was part of the Indian contingent for the 2026 Commonwealth Games held in Glasgow. In the 65 kg event, he won the silver medal with a total lift of 286 kg (631 lb). In snatch, he cleared 126 kg (278 lb) in his second attempt, before failing to lift 129 kg (284 lb) in his third and final attempt. In clean & jerk, he cleared 160 kg (350 lb) in his second attempt, and failed to lift 170 kg (370 lb) in his third and final attempt.
