= Onome Didih =

Nigerian weightlifter (born 2004)

Personal information
- Full name: Onome Omolola Didih
- Born: 12 June 2004 (age 22)

Sport
- Country: Nigeria
- Sport: Weightlifting
- Weight class: 53 kg
Medal record
Women's weightlifting
Representing Nigeria
African Championships
Gold medal – first place	2026 Ismailia	53 kg
Commonwealth Games
Gold medal – first place	2026 Glasgow	53 kg

Onome Omolola Didih (born 12 June 2004) is a Nigerian weightlifter. She won a gold medal at the 2026 Commonwealth Games and set a new Commonwealth Games record in the snatch, clean and jerk, and total categories in the 53 kg weight class.

== Career ==
In May 2026, Didih competed at the 2026 African Weightlifting Championships and won a gold medal in the 53 kg event. In July 2026, she competed at the 2026 Commonwealth Games and won a gold medal in the 53 kg event. She opened the event with 93 kg in the snatch to set a new Commonwealth Games and Commonwealth record. She followed it up with 113 kg in the clean and jerk, another Games and Commonwealth record, before finishing with a total lift of 206 kg, also a new Games and Commonwealth record. She also set African records in the snatch, clean and jerk and total.
