= Muhammad Erry Hidayat =

Malaysian weightlifter (born 1999)

Personal information
- Full name: Muhammad Erry Hidayat bin Muhammad Hidayat
- Nickname: Erry
- Nationality: Malaysian
- Born: 24 November 1999 (age 26) Kuala Lumpur, Malaysia
- Height: 171 cm (5 ft 7 in)
- Weight: 72 kg (159 lb)

Sport
- Country: Malaysia
- Sport: Weightlifting
- Event: 73 kg
Medal record
Men's weightlifting
Representing Malaysia
Commonwealth Games
Gold medal – first place	2026 Glasgow	79 kg
Silver medal – second place	2022 Birmingham	73 kg
Commonwealth Championships
Silver medal – second place	2021 Tashkent	73 kg
Southeast Asian Games
Silver medal – second place	2025 Thailand	79 kg
Bronze medal – third place	2019 Philippines	69 kg
Bronze medal – third place	2021 Vietnam	73 kg
Commonwealth Youth Games
Gold medal – first place	2015 Apia	69 kg

Muhammad Erry Hidayat bin Muhammad Hidayat (born 24 November 1999) is a Malaysian weightlifter. He is the son of the country's former weightlifter Hidayat Hamidon who was the 1998 gold medal medalists in weightlifting at the 1998 Commonwealth Games. He has won several medals in various competitions, including a bronze medal at the 2019 SEA Games in Manila and a silver at the 2022 Commonwealth Games in Birmingham. Erry also won a bronze medal at the 2021 SEA Games in Vietnam and renewed the National 73 kg Weightlifting record by lifting 316 kg. In November 2023, Erry was crowned the Federal Territories Sportsman for 2021/2022.

== Career ==
Erry made his international debut in 2015 at the 2015 Commonwealth Youth Games in Apia, Samoa where he won a gold in 69 kg category.

At the age of 17, Erry won gold at the 2016 Sukma Games in the 69 kg final. In clean and jerk category, he managed to get a bronze medal after lifting weighing 143 kg.

At the 2017 SEA Games in Kuala Lumpur, Malaysia. Erry managed to finished 4th in the Men's 69kg event as a future prospect for Malaysia in Weightlifting.

In April 2018, Erry competed in the 2018 Commonwealth Games but had to accept the defeat after placing 5th in the Men's 69 kg with a total 291.

At the 2019 SEA Games in Manila, Philippines. Erry brought a bronze medal for Malaysia in the Men's 69kg. In the same year, Erry made his debut at the 2019 IWF Championships. However, he wasn't managed to finish the event.

In 2021, Erry competed at the 2021 IWF Championships. He only managed to finished 12th with a total of 301 kg in Men's 73 kg. At the 2021 Commonwealth Weightlifting Championships, he won a silver medal in the Men's 73 kg.

In May 2022, he broke his previous national record with a total 316 kg combined to retain his bronze medal in the men's 73 kg category at the 2021 SEA Games. This bettered his national record of 312 kg, 141 kg in snatch and 171 kg in clean and jerk which was set in Melaka in 2020. He also bagged a silver in the 73 kg at the 2022 Commonwealth Games in Birmingham. Erry contented with an overall lift of 303 kg, having recorded 138 kg in snatch and 165 kg in clean and jerk.
