= 2023 European Judo Championships – Men's 73 kg =

Judo competition

Judo Men's 73 kg at the 2023 European Judo Championships
- Venue: Sud de France Arena
- Location: Montpellier, France
- Date: 4 November 2023
- Competitors: 40 from 30 nations

Medalists
gold medal	Hidayat Heydarov (3rd title)	Azerbaijan
silver medal	Salvador Cases	Spain
bronze medal	Akil Gjakova	Kosovo
bronze medal	Petru Pelivan	Moldova

Competition at external databases
- Links: IJF • JudoInside

The Men's 73 kg event at the 2023 European Judo Championships was held at the Sud de France Arena in Montpellier, France on 4 November 2023.

== Results ==
=== Finals ===
Semi-finals
(Azerbaijan) Hidayat Heydarov	10
(Moldova) Petru Pelivan	00
(Georgia (country)) Lasha Shavdatuashvili	00 (yellow card)
(Spain) Salvador Cases	10

Final
(Azerbaijan) Hidayat Heydarov	02 (yellow card)
(Spain) Salvador Cases	00 (yellow card)

=== Repechage ===
Repechage
(Hungary) Dániel Szegedi	00
(Kosovo) Akil Gjakova	02
Danil Lavrentev	00
(Moldova) Adil Osmanov	01

Bronze medal
(Kosovo) Akil Gjakova	01
(Georgia (country)) Lasha Shavdatuashvili	00
(Moldova) Adil Osmanov	00
(Moldova) Petru Pelivan	10

=== Pool A ===
First round
(Poland) Ksawery Morka	01 (yellow card)
(United Kingdom) Eric Ham	00
(Iceland) Kjartan Hreiðarsson	00
(Hungary) Dániel Szegedi	10 (yellow card)

Round of 32
(Azerbaijan) Hidayat Heydarov	10 (yellow card)
(Belgium) Abdul Malik Umayev	00
(Poland) Ksawery Morka	10
(Republic of Ireland) Joshua Green	00
(Germany) Igor Wandtke	00
(Hungary) Dániel Szegedi	10
(Switzerland) Naim Matt	00
(Armenia) Ferdinand Karapetian	10 (yellow card)

Round of 16
(Azerbaijan) Hidayat Heydarov	10
(Poland) Ksawery Morka	00 (yellow card)
(Hungary) Dániel Szegedi	01
(Armenia) Ferdinand Karapetian	00

Quarter-finals
(Azerbaijan) Hidayat Heydarov	10
(Hungary) Dániel Szegedi	00

=== Pool B ===
First round
(France) Joan-Benjamin Gaba	00 (yellow card)
(Serbia) Bajsangur Bagajev	01
(Portugal) Thelmo Gomes	00 (yellow card)
(Spain) Jorge Cano García	01 (yellow card)

Round of 32
(Italy) Manuel Lombardo	00
(Bulgaria) Mark Hristov	01
(Serbia) Bajsangur Bagajev	00 (yellow card)
(Kosovo) Akil Gjakova	01 (yellow card)
(Moldova) Petru Pelivan	11
Kavan Majidi	00
(Spain) Jorge Cano García	00 (yellow card)
(Finland) Valtteri Olin	10

Round of 16
(Bulgaria) Mark Hristov	00
(Kosovo) Akil Gjakova	02 (yellow card)
(Moldova) Petru Pelivan	10 (yellow card)
(Finland) Valtteri Olin	00

Quarter-finals
(Kosovo) Akil Gjakova	00
(Moldova) Petru Pelivan	10 (yellow card)

=== Pool C ===
First round
(Azerbaijan) Rashid Mammadaliyev	10
(Finland) Turpal Djoukaev	00
(Romania) Alexandru Raicu	00 (yellow card)
Danil Lavrentev	10

Round of 32
(Georgia (country)) Lasha Shavdatuashvili	01
(Azerbaijan) Rashid Mammadaliyev	00
(Serbia) Filip Jovanović	00
(Slovenia) Martin Hojak	01
(Georgia (country)) Giorgi Terashvili	00 (yellow card)
Danil Lavrentev	01 (yellow card)
(Albania) Indrit Cullhaj	00 (yellow card)
(Cyprus) Kyprianos Andreou	02

Round of 16
(Georgia (country)) Lasha Shavdatuashvili	10
(Slovenia) Martin Hojak	00
Danil Lavrentev	01
(Cyprus) Kyprianos Andreou	00 (yellow card)

Quarter-finals
(Georgia (country)) Lasha Shavdatuashvili	01
Danil Lavrentev	00 (yellow card)

=== Pool D ===
First round
(Poland) Adam Stodolski	00
(Moldova) Adil Osmanov	02
(Latvia) Abulfazs Nasirovs	00
(Italy) Giovanni Esposito	10

Round of 32
(Switzerland) Nils Stump	00
(Greece) Michail Tsoutlasvili	11 (yellow card)
(Moldova) Adil Osmanov	01 (yellow card)
(Armenia) Arsen Avedisyan	00 (yellow card)
(Spain) Salvador Cases	01
(Israel) Tohar Butbul	00
(Italy) Giovanni Esposito	02 (yellow card)
(Lithuania) Kęstutis Vitkauskas	00 (yellow card)

Round of 16
(Greece) Michail Tsoutlasvili	00
(Moldova) Adil Osmanov	10
(Spain) Salvador Cases	10
(Italy) Giovanni Esposito	00 (yellow card)

Quarter-finals
(Moldova) Adil Osmanov	00
(Spain) Salvador Cases	10 (yellow card)
