= 2024 World Judo Championships – Men's 73 kg =

Judo competition

Judo Men's 73 kg at the 2024 World Judo Championships
- Venue: Mubadala Arena
- Location: Abu Dhabi, United Arab Emirates
- Date: 20 May 2024
- Competitors: 52 from 41 nations
- Total prize money: €57,000

Medalists
gold medal	Hidayat Heydarov (1st title)	Azerbaijan
silver medal	Tatsuki Ishihara	Japan
bronze medal	Lavjargalyn Ankhzayaa	Mongolia
bronze medal	Nils Stump	Switzerland

Competition at external databases
- Links: IJF • JudoInside

The Men's 73 kg event at the 2024 World Judo Championships was held at the Mubadala Arena in Abu Dhabi, United Arab Emirates on 20 May 2024.

== Results ==
=== Finals ===
Semi-finals
(Azerbaijan) Hidayat Heydarov	11
(Germany) Igor Wandtke	00
(Japan) Tatsuki Ishihara	10
(Mongolia) Lavjargalyn Ankhzayaa	00 (yellow card)

Final
(Azerbaijan) Hidayat Heydarov	10
(Japan) Tatsuki Ishihara	01 (yellow card)

=== Repechage ===
Repechage
(Brazil) Daniel Cargnin	10
(Mongolia) Batzayaagiin Erdenebayar	00
Makhmadbek Makhmadbekov	00 (yellow card)
(Switzerland) Nils Stump	11

Bronze medal
(Brazil) Daniel Cargnin	00
(Mongolia) Lavjargalyn Ankhzayaa	10
(Switzerland) Nils Stump	02 (yellow card)
(Germany) Igor Wandtke	00

=== Pool A ===
First round
(The Gambia) Faye Njie	00
(Kosovo) Akil Gjakova	02
(Republic of Ireland) Joshua Green	00
(Finland) Turpal Djoukaev	11
(Spain) Salvador Cases	10
(Kyrgyzstan) Chyngyzkhan Sagynaliev	00 (yellow card)
(Georgia (country)) Giorgi Terashvili	00
(France) Joan-Benjamin Gaba	10
(Portugal) Otari Kvantidze	00
(Turkey) Umalt Demirel	01 (yellow card)

Round of 32
(Azerbaijan) Hidayat Heydarov	02 (yellow card)
(Kosovo) Akil Gjakova	00 (yellow card)
(Finland) Turpal Djoukaev	00
(Spain) Salvador Cases	01
(Brazil) Daniel Cargnin	01 (yellow card)
(France) Joan-Benjamin Gaba	00
(Turkey) Umalt Demirel	00
(Italy) Manuel Parlati	10

Round of 16
(Azerbaijan) Hidayat Heydarov	10 (yellow card)
(Spain) Salvador Cases	00
(Brazil) Daniel Cargnin	02
(Italy) Manuel Parlati	01

Quarter-finals
(Azerbaijan) Hidayat Heydarov	10
(Brazil) Daniel Cargnin	00

=== Pool B ===
First round
(United Arab Emirates) Karim Abdulaev	00
Ruslan Halavachou	02 (yellow card)
(South Korea) Lee Eun-kyul	00
(Germany) Igor Wandtke	01
(Mongolia) Batzayaagiin Erdenebayar	01
(Moldova) Petru Pelivan	00 (yellow card)
(Slovenia) Martin Hojak	00 (yellow card)
(Romania) Ioan Dzițac	01
(Bulgaria) Mark Hristov	10
(Tunisia) Aleddine Ben Chalbi	00

Round of 32
(Uzbekistan) Murodjon Yuldoshev	10 (yellow card)
Ruslan Halavachou	00
(Germany) Igor Wandtke	01
(Kazakhstan) Bakhitzhan Abdurakhmanov	00
(Tajikistan) Behruzi Khojazoda	00
(Mongolia) Batzayaagiin Erdenebayar	01
(Romania) Ioan Dzițac	11
(Bulgaria) Mark Hristov	00

Round of 16
(Uzbekistan) Murodjon Yuldoshev	00
(Germany) Igor Wandtke	10
(Mongolia) Batzayaagiin Erdenebayar	01 (yellow card)
(Romania) Ioan Dzițac	00

Quarter-finals
(Germany) Igor Wandtke	01
(Mongolia) Batzayaagiin Erdenebayar	00

=== Pool C ===
First round
(India) Arun Kumar	10 (yellow card)
(Cyprus) Kyprianos Andreou	00
(Poland) Adam Stodolski	00
(Japan) Tatsuki Ishihara	10 (yellow card)
(Canada) Arthur Margelidon	01 (yellow card)
(Spain) Jorge Cano García	00
(United States) Jack Yonezuka	01
(Finland) Valtteri Olin	00 (yellow card)
(Mexico) Gilberto Cardoso	00
(Moldova) Adil Osmanov	01

Round of 32
(Uzbekistan) Shakhram Ahadov	10
(India) Arun Kumar	00
(Japan) Tatsuki Ishihara	11
(Canada) Arthur Margelidon	00
Makhmadbek Makhmadbekov	10
(United States) Jack Yonezuka	00 (yellow card)
(Moldova) Adil Osmanov	10
(Kazakhstan) Daniyar Shamshayev	00

Round of 16
(Uzbekistan) Shakhram Ahadov	00
(Japan) Tatsuki Ishihara	01 (yellow card)
Makhmadbek Makhmadbekov	01 (yellow card)
(Moldova) Adil Osmanov	00 (yellow card)

Quarter-finals
(Japan) Tatsuki Ishihara	02 (yellow card)
Makhmadbek Makhmadbekov	00

=== Pool D ===
First round
(Mongolia) Lavjargalyn Ankhzayaa	01 (yellow card)
(Djibouti) Aden-Alexandre Houssein	00
(Romania) Alexandru Raicu	10
(Turkey) Bilal Çiloğlu	01
(Italy) Giovanni Esposito	10 (yellow card)
(North Korea) Kim Chol-gwang	01
(Dominican Republic) Antonio Tornal	00 (yellow card)
(Austria) Samuel Gassner	10
(Thailand) Masayuki Terada	00
(Algeria) Messaoud Dris	10 (yellow card)

Round of 32
(Georgia (country)) Lasha Shavdatuashvili	01
(Mongolia) Lavjargalyn Ankhzayaa	10
(Romania) Alexandru Raicu	02
(Guinea-Bissau) Diogo César	00 (yellow card)
(Switzerland) Nils Stump	02 (yellow card)
(Italy) Giovanni Esposito	01 (yellow card)
(Austria) Samuel Gassner	01
(Algeria) Messaoud Dris	11

Round of 16
(Mongolia) Lavjargalyn Ankhzayaa	10
(Romania) Alexandru Raicu	00
(Switzerland) Nils Stump	10 (yellow card)
(Algeria) Messaoud Dris	00

Quarter-finals
(Mongolia) Lavjargalyn Ankhzayaa	02
(Switzerland) Nils Stump	00

== Prize money ==
The sums listed bring the total prizes awarded to €57,000 for the individual event.

Medal	Total	Judoka	Coach
Gold	€26,000	€20,800	€5,200
Silver	€15,000	€12,000	€3,000
Bronze	€8,000	€6,400	€1,600
