= 2025 World Judo Championships – Men's 73 kg =

Judo competition

Judo Men's 73 kg at the 2025 World Judo Championships
- Venue: László Papp Budapest Sports Arena
- Location: Budapest, Hungary
- Date: 15 June 2025
- Competitors: 41 from 34 nations
- Total prize money: €57,000

Medalists
gold medal	Joan-Benjamin Gaba (1st title); France
silver medal	Daniel Cargnin; Brazil
bronze medal	Makhmadbek Makhmadbekov; United Arab Emirates
bronze medal	Tatsuki Ishihara; Japan

Competition at external databases
- Links: IJF • JudoInside

The 2025 World Judo Championships was held at the László Papp Budapest Sports Arena in Budapest, Hungary on 15 June 2025.

== Results ==
=== Finals ===
Semi-finals
(Italy) Manuel Lombardo	000
(France) Joan-Benjamin Gaba	100 (yellow card)
(Brazil) Daniel Cargnin	100
(Serbia) Bajsangur Bagajev	000

Final
(France) Joan-Benjamin Gaba	010 (yellow card)
(Brazil) Daniel Cargnin	000 (yellow card)

=== Repechage ===
Repechage
(Portugal) Otari Kvantidze	001
(United Arab Emirates) Makhmadbek Makhmadbekov	110 (yellow card)
(Japan) Tatsuki Ishihara	100 (yellow card)
(Azerbaijan) Rashid Mammadaliyev	000

Bronze medal
(United Arab Emirates) Makhmadbek Makhmadbekov	010 (yellow card)
(Serbia) Bajsangur Bagajev	000
(Japan) Tatsuki Ishihara	011 (yellow card)
(Italy) Manuel Lombardo	001 (yellow card)

=== Pool A ===
First round
(Republic of Ireland) Joshua Green	100
(Ivory Coast) Jerome Assafoua Zelman	000
(Germany) Jano Rübo	100
(Poland) Adam Stodolski	000

Round of 32
(Azerbaijan) Hidayat Heydarov	000 (yellow card)
(Portugal) Otari Kvantidze	001
(Republic of Ireland) Joshua Green	000
(United States) Jack Yonezuka	001
(Italy) Manuel Lombardo	010
(South Korea) Bae Dong-hyun	000
(Germany) Jano Rübo	000
(Czech Republic) Chusniddin Karimov	100 (yellow card)

Round of 16
(Portugal) Otari Kvantidze	010
(United States) Jack Yonezuka	000 (yellow card)
(Italy) Manuel Lombardo	110
(Czech Republic) Chusniddin Karimov	002

Quarter-finals
(Portugal) Otari Kvantidze	000
(Italy) Manuel Lombardo	100

=== Pool B ===
First round
(Mongolia) Odgereliin Uranbayar	001
(Austria) Samuel Gaßner	000 (yellow card)
(France) Joan-Benjamin Gaba	101 (yellow card)
(Hungary) Dániel Szegedi	000

Round of 32
(United Arab Emirates) Makhmadbek Makhmadbekov	100
(Thailand) Masayuki Terada	000
(Mongolia) Odgereliin Uranbayar	002
(Morocco) Hassan Doukkali	000
(Tajikistan) Abubakr Sherov	011
(Switzerland) Nils Stump	100
(France) Joan-Benjamin Gaba	100 (yellow card)
(Kazakhstan) Yeset Kuanov	000 (yellow card)

Round of 16
(United Arab Emirates) Makhmadbek Makhmadbekov	001
(Mongolia) Odgereliin Uranbayar	000
(Switzerland) Nils Stump	000 (yellow card)
(France) Joan-Benjamin Gaba	100

Quarter-finals
(United Arab Emirates) Makhmadbek Makhmadbekov	000
(France) Joan-Benjamin Gaba	100

=== Pool C ===
First round
(Tajikistan) Behruzi Khojazoda	100
(India) Arun Kumar	010 (yellow card)
(Brazil) Daniel Cargnin	110
(Germany) Igor Wandtke	000 (yellow card)

Round of 32
(Japan) Tatsuki Ishihara	020
(The Gambia) Faye Njie	000 (yellow card)
(Tajikistan) Behruzi Khojazoda	100 (yellow card)
(Tunisia) Aleddine Ben Chalbi	000
(Kosovo) Akil Gjakova	001 (yellow card)
(Romania) Ioan Dzițac	000 (yellow card)
(Brazil) Daniel Cargnin	010
(Montenegro) Jahja Nurković	000

Round of 16
(Japan) Tatsuki Ishihara	010
(Tajikistan) Behruzi Khojazoda	000
(Kosovo) Akil Gjakova	000
(Brazil) Daniel Cargnin	100

Quarter-finals
(Japan) Tatsuki Ishihara	000 (yellow card)
(Brazil) Daniel Cargnin	001 (yellow card)

=== Pool D ===
First round
(Mongolia) Lavjargalyn Ankhzayaa	001
(Hungary) Áron Szabó	000
(Belgium) Zelemkhan Batchaev	000 (yellow card)
(Serbia) Bajsangur Bagajev	010
(United Arab Emirates) Kazbek Naguchev	100
(Italy) Giovanni Esposito	000 (yellow card)

Round of 32
(Uzbekistan) Shakhram Ahadov	100 (yellow card)
(Mongolia) Lavjargalyn Ankhzayaa	000
(Serbia) Bajsangur Bagajev	100 (yellow card)
(Turkey) Bilal Çiloğlu	000
(Azerbaijan) Rashid Mammadaliyev	010 (yellow card)
(United Arab Emirates) Kazbek Naguchev	000
(Georgia (country)) Lasha Shavdatuashvili	100
(Bulgaria) Mark Hristov	000

Round of 16
(Uzbekistan) Shakhram Ahadov	000
(Serbia) Bajsangur Bagajev	001
(Azerbaijan) Rashid Mammadaliyev	100
(Georgia (country)) Lasha Shavdatuashvili	000

Quarter-finals
(Serbia) Bajsangur Bagajev	010
(Azerbaijan) Rashid Mammadaliyev	000 (yellow card)

== Prize money ==
The sums listed bring the total prizes awarded to €57,000 for the individual event.

Medal	Total	Judoka	Coach
Gold	€26,000	€20,800	€5,200
Silver	€15,000	€12,000	€3,000
Bronze	€8,000	€6,400	€1,600
