= 2025 European Judo Championships – Men's 73 kg =

Judo competition

Judo Men's 73 kg at the 2025 European Judo Championships
- Venue: Morača Sports Center
- Location: Podgorica, Montenegro
- Date: 24 April 2025
- Competitors: 39 from 28 nations

Medalists
gold medal	Danil Lavrentev (1st title)
silver medal	Manuel Lombardo	Italy
bronze medal	Joan-Benjamin Gaba	France
bronze medal	Rashid Mammadaliyev	Azerbaijan

Competition at external databases
- Links: IJF • JudoInside

The men's 73 kg competition at the 2025 European Judo Championships was held at the Morača Sports Center in Podgorica, Montenegro on 24 April 2025.

== Results ==
=== Finals ===
Semi-finals
(International Judo Federation) Danil Lavrentev	110
(Azerbaijan) Rashid Mammadaliyev	000
(Italy) Manuel Lombardo	010
(Georgia (country)) Lasha Shavdatuashvili	000 (yellow card)

Final
(International Judo Federation) Danil Lavrentev	101
(Italy) Manuel Lombardo	000

=== Repechage ===
Repechage
(Italy) Giovanni Esposito	000 (yellow card)
(France) Joan-Benjamin Gaba	001
(Hungary) Dániel Szegedi	100
(Kosovo) Akil Gjakova	000

Bronze medal
(France) Joan-Benjamin Gaba	100
(Georgia (country)) Lasha Shavdatuashvili	000
(Hungary) Dániel Szegedi	000
(Azerbaijan) Rashid Mammadaliyev	100

=== Pool A ===
First round
(Kosovo) Dardan Cena	001 (yellow card)
(Israel) Baruch Shmailov	000
(Serbia) Bogdan Veličković	000 (yellow card)
(Poland) Adam Stodolski	100 (yellow card)

Round of 32
(International Judo Federation) Danil Lavrentev	100 (yellow card)
(Turkey) İbrahim Demirel	000
(Kosovo) Dardan Cena	101 (yellow card)
(Ukraine) Said-Magomed Khalidov	000
(Italy) Giovanni Esposito	001
(Armenia) Artak Torosyan	000
(Poland) Adam Stodolski	000
(Germany) Jano Rübo	001

Round of 16
(International Judo Federation) Danil Lavrentev	100
(Kosovo) Dardan Cena	000
(Italy) Giovanni Esposito	010
(Germany) Jano Rübo	001

Quarter-finals
(International Judo Federation) Danil Lavrentev	020
(Italy) Giovanni Esposito	000

=== Pool B ===
First round
(Moldova) Vlad Mitru	000
(Montenegro) Jahja Nurković	100
(Romania) Lucian Borş-Dumitrescu	000 (yellow card)
(Belgium) Zelemkhan Batchaev	010

Round of 32
(Azerbaijan) Rashid Mammadaliyev	010
(United Kingdom) Benjamin Levy	000
(Montenegro) Jahja Nurković	000
(Portugal) Otari Kvantidze	001
(France) Joan-Benjamin Gaba	001
(Bulgaria) Mark Hristov	000 (yellow card)
(Belgium) Zelemkhan Batchaev	000
(Hungary) Áron Szabó	001

Round of 16
(Azerbaijan) Rashid Mammadaliyev	020
(Portugal) Otari Kvantidze	000
(France) Joan-Benjamin Gaba	001
(Hungary) Áron Szabó	000

Quarter-finals
(Azerbaijan) Rashid Mammadaliyev	100
(France) Joan-Benjamin Gaba	000

=== Pool C ===
First round
(Serbia) Filip Jovanović	010
(Croatia) Robert Klačar	000

Round of 32
(Italy) Manuel Lombardo	101
(Serbia) Filip Jovanović	000
(Germany) Igor Wandtke	110
(Greece) Georgios Markarian	000
(Hungary) Dániel Szegedi	001
(Lithuania) Kęstutis Vitkauskas	000 (yellow card)
(Bulgaria) Victor Skerlev	100
(Republic of Ireland) Joshua Green	000

Round of 16
(Italy) Manuel Lombardo	001 (yellow card)
(Germany) Igor Wandtke	000
(Hungary) Dániel Szegedi	011 (yellow card)
(Bulgaria) Victor Skerlev	001

Quarter-finals
(Italy) Manuel Lombardo	101 (yellow card)
(Hungary) Dániel Szegedi	000 (yellow card)

=== Pool D ===
First round
(France) Maxime Gobert	001 (yellow card)
(Austria) Samuel Gaßner	000 (yellow card)
(Czech Republic) Chusniddin Karimov	102
(Cyprus) Kyprianos Andreou	000

Round of 32
(Kosovo) Akil Gjakova	010
(France) Maxime Gobert	000 (yellow card)
(Moldova) Victor Sterpu	001
(Romania) Ioan Dzițac	000
(Georgia (country)) Lasha Shavdatuashvili	100
(Czech Republic) Chusniddin Karimov	000
(International Judo Federation) Ruslan Halavachou	000 (yellow card)
(Turkey) Bilal Çiloğlu	100

Round of 16
(Kosovo) Akil Gjakova	100
(Moldova) Victor Sterpu	000
(Georgia (country)) Lasha Shavdatuashvili	100
(Turkey) Bilal Çiloğlu	000

Quarter-finals
(Kosovo) Akil Gjakova	000
(Georgia (country)) Lasha Shavdatuashvili	001
