= 2024 European Judo Championships – Men's 73 kg =

Judo competition

Judo Men's 73 kg at the 2024 European Judo Championships
- Venue: Arena Zagreb
- Location: Zagreb, Croatia
- Date: 26 April
- Competitors: 46 from 31 nations

Medalists
gold medal	Hidayat Heydarov (4th title)	Azerbaijan
silver medal	Danil Lavrentev
bronze medal	Joan-Benjamin Gaba	France
bronze medal	Lasha Shavdatuashvili	Georgia

Competition at external databases
- Links: IJF • JudoInside

The Men's 73 kg event at the 2024 European Judo Championships was held at the Arena Zagreb in Zagreb, Croatia on 26 April 2024.

== Results ==
=== Finals ===
Semi-finals
(Azerbaijan) Hidayat Heydarov	01 (yellow card)
(Moldova) Adil Osmanov	00 (yellow card)
Danil Lavrentev	01
(France) Joan-Benjamin Gaba	00

Final
(Azerbaijan) Hidayat Heydarov	10 (yellow card)
Danil Lavrentev	00

=== Repechage ===
Repechage
Ruslan Halavachou	00
(Finland) Valtteri Olin	01 (yellow card)
(Georgia (country)) Lasha Shavdatuashvili	01 (yellow card)
(Bulgaria) Mark Hristov	00 (yellow card)

Bronze medal
(Finland) Valtteri Olin	00 (yellow card)
(France) Joan-Benjamin Gaba	01 (yellow card)
(Georgia (country)) Lasha Shavdatuashvili	01 (yellow card)
(Moldova) Adil Osmanov	00

=== Pool A ===
First round
(Lithuania) Kęstutis Vitkauskas	00
(Albania) Indrit Cullhaj	10
(France) Orlando Cazorla	00
(Portugal) Otari Kvantidze	10
(Bosnia and Herzegovina) Darko Topalović	00
(Republic of Ireland) Joshua Green	02 (yellow card)
(Georgia (country)) Giorgi Chikhelidze	10 (yellow card)
(Bulgaria) Denislav Ivanov	00 (yellow card)

Round of 32
(Azerbaijan) Hidayat Heydarov	10
(Albania) Indrit Cullhaj	00
(Portugal) Otari Kvantidze	02 (yellow card)
(Spain) Jorge Cano García	00
(Azerbaijan) Rashid Mammadaliyev	10
(Republic of Ireland) Joshua Green	00
(Georgia (country)) Giorgi Chikhelidze	01
Ruslan Halavachou	11 (yellow card)

Round of 16
(Azerbaijan) Hidayat Heydarov	10
(Portugal) Otari Kvantidze	00 (yellow card)
(Azerbaijan) Rashid Mammadaliyev	00
Ruslan Halavachou	01

Quarter-finals
(Azerbaijan) Hidayat Heydarov	10
Ruslan Halavachou	00

=== Pool B ===
First round
(Serbia) Filip Jovanović	00
(Austria) Lukas Reiter	10
(Armenia) Artak Torosyan	10
Ahmad Alikaj	00
(Romania) Ioan Dzițac	00
(Italy) Manuel Parlati	02

Round of 32
Makhmadbek Makhmadbekov	10
(Austria) Lukas Reiter	00
(Turkey) Umalt Demirel	00 (yellow card)
(Finland) Valtteri Olin	01 (yellow card)
(Moldova) Adil Osmanov	10 (yellow card)
(Armenia) Artak Torosyan	00
(Italy) Manuel Parlati	10 (yellow card)
(Kosovo) Dardan Cena	00

Round of 16
Makhmadbek Makhmadbekov	00
(Finland) Valtteri Olin	10
(Moldova) Adil Osmanov	02
(Italy) Manuel Parlati	00 (yellow card)

Quarter-finals
(Finland) Valtteri Olin	00 (yellow card)
(Moldova) Adil Osmanov	01

=== Pool C ===
First round
(Croatia) Robert Klačar	02
(Spain) Javier Pena Insausti	00
(Finland) Turpal Djoukaev	01
(Czech Republic) Chusniddin Karimov	00
(Austria) Samuel Gassner	02
(Cyprus) Kyprianos Andreou	00
(Portugal) Thelmo Gomes	00
(Romania) Alexandru Raicu	10

Round of 32
(Georgia (country)) Lasha Shavdatuashvili	10
(Croatia) Robert Klačar	00
(Finland) Turpal Djoukaev	01 (yellow card)
(Netherlands) Koen Heg	00
Danil Lavrentev	11
(Austria) Samuel Gassner	00 (yellow card)
(Romania) Alexandru Raicu	02
(Monaco) Cédric Bessi	00

Round of 16
(Georgia (country)) Lasha Shavdatuashvili	10
(Finland) Turpal Djoukaev	00 (yellow card)
Danil Lavrentev	10
(Romania) Alexandru Raicu	00

Quarter-finals
(Georgia (country)) Lasha Shavdatuashvili	00
Danil Lavrentev	10 (yellow card)

=== Pool D ===
First round
(Hungary) Dániel Szegedi	01
(Estonia) Viljar Lipard	00 (yellow card)
(Germany) Alexander Gabler	01
Kavan Majidi	10 (yellow card)
(Slovenia) Martin Hojak	00
(Kosovo) Akil Gjakova	01

Round of 32
(Moldova) Petru Pelivan	11
(Hungary) Dániel Szegedi	00 (yellow card)
Kavan Majidi	00
(France) Joan-Benjamin Gaba	10 (yellow card)
(Israel) Tohar Butbul	10
(Turkey) Bilal Çiloğlu	00
(Kosovo) Akil Gjakova	00 (yellow card)
(Bulgaria) Mark Hristov	02

Round of 16
(Moldova) Petru Pelivan	00
(France) Joan-Benjamin Gaba	01 (yellow card)
(Israel) Tohar Butbul	01
(Bulgaria) Mark Hristov	02

Quarter-finals
(France) Joan-Benjamin Gaba	01 (yellow card)
(Bulgaria) Mark Hristov	00
