= 2021 World Judo Championships – Men's 73 kg =

Judo competition

Judo Men's 73 kg at the 2021 World Judo Championships
- Venue: László Papp Budapest Sports Arena
- Location: Budapest, Hungary
- Date: 8 June
- Competitors: 62 from 50 nations
- Total prize money: 57,000€

Medalists
gold medal	Lasha Shavdatuashvili (1st title)	Georgia
silver medal	Tommy Macias	Sweden
bronze medal	Bilal Çiloğlu	Turkey
bronze medal	Soichi Hashimoto	Japan

Competition at external databases
- Links: IJF • JudoInside

The Men's 73 kg competition at the 2021 World Judo Championships was held on 8 June 2021.

== Results ==
=== Finals ===
Semi-finals
(Japan) Soichi Hashimoto	00
(Sweden) Tommy Macias	01
(Georgia (country)) Lasha Shavdatuashvili	01
(Turkey) Bilal Çiloğlu	00

Final
(Sweden) Tommy Macias	00
(Georgia (country)) Lasha Shavdatuashvili	10

=== Repechage ===
Repechage
(Spain) Salvador Cases	00
(Uzbekistan) Khikmatillokh Turaev	01

Third place
(Uzbekistan) Khikmatillokh Turaev	00
(Turkey) Bilal Çiloğlu	01

Repechage
(Hungary) Miklós Ungvári	00
(Azerbaijan) Hidayat Heydarov	11

Third place
(Azerbaijan) Hidayat Heydarov	00
(Japan) Soichi Hashimoto	10

=== Pool A ===
First round
(Costa Rica) Julián Sancho	01
(Turkey) Bayram Kandemir	10
(Mozambique) Narciso Matos	00
(Djibouti) Aden-Alexandre Houssein	10
(Slovenia) Juš Mecilosek	00
(Switzerland) Nils Stump	10
(Kazakhstan) Zhansay Smagulov	10
(Mexico) Gilberto Cardoso	00
(Philippines) Keisei Nakano	00
Makhmadbek Makhmadbekov	10
(Burkina Faso) Lucas Diallo	00
(Hungary) Frigyes Szabó	01
(Ukraine) Oleksandr Koshliak	00
(Spain) Salvador Cases	10

Second round
(Japan) Soichi Hashimoto	10
(Turkey) Bayram Kandemir	00
(Djibouti) Aden-Alexandre Houssein	00
(Switzerland) Nils Stump	10
(Kazakhstan) Zhansay Smagulov	00
Makhmadbek Makhmadbekov	11
(Hungary) Frigyes Szabó	00
(Spain) Salvador Cases	10

Third round
(Japan) Soichi Hashimoto	10
(Switzerland) Nils Stump	00
Makhmadbek Makhmadbekov	01
(Spain) Salvador Cases	10

Quarterfinals
(Japan) Soichi Hashimoto	10
(Spain) Salvador Cases	00

=== Pool B ===
First round
(Uzbekistan) Khikmatillokh Turaev	10
(Israel) Oron Giner	00
(Poland) Adam Stodolski	11
(Jordan) Younis Eyal	00
(Gabon) Ety Ndong	00
(Moldova) Victor Sterpu	10
(Saudi Arabia) Sulaiman Hamad	10
(Samoa) William Tai Tin	00
(Sweden) Tommy Macias	10
(Azerbaijan) Nurlan Osmanov	01
(Portugal) João Fernando	00
(United Arab Emirates) Victor Scvortov	01
(Belarus) Vadzim Shoka	00
(Georgia (country)) Nugzar Tatalashvili	01
Fares Badawi	00
(Romania) Adrian Şulcă	11

Second round
(Uzbekistan) Khikmatillokh Turaev	10
(Poland) Adam Stodolski	00
(Moldova) Victor Sterpu	00
(Saudi Arabia) Sulaiman Hamad	10
(Sweden) Tommy Macias	10
(United Arab Emirates) Victor Scvortov	00
(Georgia (country)) Nugzar Tatalashvili	00
(Romania) Adrian Şulcă	10

Third round
(Uzbekistan) Khikmatillokh Turaev	10
(Saudi Arabia) Sulaiman Hamad	00
(Sweden) Tommy Macias	01
(Romania) Adrian Şulcă	00

Quarterfinals
(Uzbekistan) Khikmatillokh Turaev	00
(Sweden) Tommy Macias	01

=== Pool C ===
First round
Denis Yartsev	10
(Monaco) Cédric Bessi	00
(Greece) Michail Tsoutlasvili	00
(Hungary) Miklós Ungvári	01
(The Gambia) Faye Njie	01
Ahmad Alikaj	00
(Georgia (country)) Lasha Shavdatuashvili	10
(Peru) Alonso Wong	00
(Algeria) Fethi Nourine	00
(Brazil) Eduardo Barbosa	10
(Ghana) Emmanuel Nartey	00
(Cuba) Magdiel Estrada	01
(Israel) Yehonatan Elbaz	10
(Slovenia) Martin Hojak	01

Second round
(Mongolia) Tsogtbaatar Tsend-Ochir	10
Denis Yartsev	00
(Hungary) Miklós Ungvári	10
(The Gambia) Faye Njie	00
(Georgia (country)) Lasha Shavdatuashvili	10
(Brazil) Eduardo Barbosa	00
(Cuba) Magdiel Estrada	01
(Israel) Yehonatan Elbaz	10

Third round
(Mongolia) Tsogtbaatar Tsend-Ochir	00
(Hungary) Miklós Ungvári	11
(Georgia (country)) Lasha Shavdatuashvili	11
(Israel) Yehonatan Elbaz	00

Quarterfinals
(Hungary) Miklós Ungvári	00
(Georgia (country)) Lasha Shavdatuashvili	10

=== Pool D ===
First round
(Kosovo) Akil Gjakova	10
(Egypt) Mohamed Mohyeldin	00
(Romania) Alexandru Raicu	00
(Italy) Giovanni Esposito	10
(Haiti) Philippe Metellus	00
(Czech Republic) Jakub Ječmínek	11
(Azerbaijan) Hidayat Heydarov	10
(Mozambique) Ayton Siquir	00
(Turkey) Bilal Çiloğlu	10
(The Bahamas) Andrew Munnings	00
(Moldova) Petru Pelivan	10
(Armenia) Ferdinand Karapetian	00
(Kazakhstan) Angsarbek Gainullin	10
(Montenegro) Marko Gušić	00
(Bulgaria) Mark Hristov	10
(South Korea) Ahn Joon-sung	00

Second round
(Kosovo) Akil Gjakova	00
(Italy) Giovanni Esposito	10
(Czech Republic) Jakub Ječmínek	00
(Azerbaijan) Hidayat Heydarov	10
(Turkey) Bilal Çiloğlu	10
(Moldova) Petru Pelivan	00
(Kazakhstan) Angsarbek Gainullin	00
(Bulgaria) Mark Hristov	01

Third round
(Italy) Giovanni Esposito	00
(Azerbaijan) Hidayat Heydarov	01
(Turkey) Bilal Çiloğlu	10
(Bulgaria) Mark Hristov	00

Quarterfinals
(Azerbaijan) Hidayat Heydarov	00
(Turkey) Bilal Çiloğlu	01

== Prize money ==
The sums listed bring the total prizes awarded to 57,000€ for the individual event.

Medal	Total	Judoka	Coach
Gold	26,000€	20,800€	5,200€
Silver	15,000€	12,000€	3,000€
Bronze	8,000€	6,400€	1,600€
