= 2025 European Judo Championships – Mixed team =

Judo Mixed team at the 2025 European Judo Championships
- Venue: Morača Sports Center
- Location: Podgorica, Montenegro
- Date: 27 April 2025
- Competitors: 154 from 15 nations

Medalists
gold medal	Georgia; Eter Askilashvili; Mikheili Bakhbakhashvili; Irakli Demetrashvili; Giorgi Jabniashvili; Eteri Liparteliani; Nino Loladze; Luka Maisuradze; Lasha Shavdatuashvili; Sophio Somkhishvili; Mariam Tchanturia; Guram Tushishvili
silver medal	Italy; Kenny Komi Bedel; Giovanni Esposito; Odette Giuffrida; Manuel Lombardo; Christian Parlati; Irene Pedrotti; Gennaro Pirelli; Erica Simonetti; Giorgia Stangherlin; Asya Tavano; Veronica Toniolo
bronze medal	Germany; Erik Abramov; Seija Ballhaus; Samira Bouizgarne; Timo Cavelius; Fabian Kansy; Losseni Kone; Anna Monta Olek; Dena Pohl; Jano Rübo; Pauline Starke; Friederike Stolze; Igor Wandtke
bronze medal	IJF; Daria Antonova; Timur Arbuzov; Tamerlan Bashaev; Denis Batchaev; Karen Galstian; Mariia Ivanova; Daria Kurbonmamadova; Danil Lavrentev; Tamara Lishchenko; Mansur Lorsanov; Elis Startseva; Irina Zueva

Champions
- Mixed team: Georgia (3rd title)

Competition at external databases
- Links: IJF • JudoInside

The mixed team event at the 2025 European Judo Championships was held at the Morača Sports Center in Podgorica, Montenegro, on 27 April 2025.

== Participants ==
14 Nations and 1 IJF Team will participate in the 2024 Mixed Team Judo Championships. The selected Judoka are:

Teams	Men			Women		
Teams	‍–‍73 kg	‍–‍90 kg	+90 kg	‍–‍57 kg	‍–‍70 kg	+70 kg
Austria	Samuel Gaßner	Bernd Fasching	Movli Borchashvilli; Stephan Hegyi	Verena Hiden	Elena Dengg; Lisa Tretnjak	Maria Höllwart
Azerbaijan	Rashid Mammadaliyev; Ruslan Pashayev	Zelim Tckaev	Ushangi Kokauri; Zelym Kotsoiev	Fidan Alizada	Sudaba Aghayeva; Gunel Hasanli	Nigar Suleymanova
Belgium	Zelemkhan Batchaev; Jorre Verstraeten	Matthias Casse; Noah Christiaens	Yves Ndao; Toma Nikiforov	Loïs Petit	Gabriella Willems	Gabrielle Bouvier
Croatia	Robert Klačar	Josip Bulić	Mikita Sviryd	Dora Bortas; Ana Viktorija Puljiz	Lara Cvjetko; Anđela Violić	Petrunjela Pavić; Tina Radić
France	Eliot Preve	Alexis Mathieu; M-G Ngayap Hambou	Mathéo Akiana Mongo; Tieman Diaby	Ophélie Vellozzi	Clarisse Agbegnenou; Marie-Ève Gahié	Romane Dicko; Léa Fontaine
Georgia	Mikheili Bakhbakhashvili; Lasha Shavdatuashvili	Giorgi Jabniashvili; Luka Maisuradze	Saba Inaneishvili; Guram Tushishvili	Eteri Liparteliani; Nino Loladze	Eter Askilashvili; Mariam Tchanturia	Sophio Somkhishvili
Germany	Jano Rübo; Igor Wandtke	Timo Cavelius| Fabian Kansy	Erik Abramov; Losseni Kone	Seija Ballhaus; Pauline Starke	Dena Pohl; Friederike Stolze	Samira Bouizgarne; Anna Monta Olek
Hungary	Áron Szabó; Dániel Szegedi	Gergely Nerpel	Mihály Cserkaszov	Róza Gyertyás; Kitti Kovács	Szofi Özbas; Brigitta Varga	Jennifer Czerlau
IJF Team	Karen Galstian; Danil Lavrentev	Timur Arbuzov; Mansur Lorsanov	Tamerlan Bashaev; Denis Batchaev	Daria Kurbonmamadova; Irina Zueva	Daria Antonova; Tamara Lishchenko	Mariia Ivanova; Elis Startseva
Italy	Giovanni Esposito; Manuel Lombardo	Kenny Komi Bedel; Christian Parlati	Gennaro Pirelli	Odette Giuffrida; Veronica Toniolo	Irene Pedrotti; Giorgia Stangherlin	Erica Simonetti; Asya Tavano
Montenegro	Jahja Nurković; Jusuf Nurković	Nebojša Gardašević; Novo Raičević	Slobodan Vukić	Aiša Nurković	Nataša Jeftić	Jovana Mrvaljević; Jovana Peković
Netherlands	Niels Thijssen	Markus van Dijk	Simeon Catharina; Jur Spijkers	Shannon van de Meeberg; Naomi van Krevel	Margit de Voogd; Joanne van Lieshout	Marit Kamps; Karen Stevenson
Poland	Wiktor Mrówczyński; Adam Stodolski	Paweł Drzymał; Jakub Pankowski	Patryk Broniec; Grzegorz Teresiński	Aleksandra Kaleta; Arleta Podolak	Aleksandra Kowalewska; Natalia Kropska	Urszula Hofman; Kinga Wolszczak
Serbia	Filip Jovanović; Bogdan Veličković	Nemanja Majdov; Miljan Radulj	Bojan Došen; Aleksandar Kukolj	Kristina Nišavić; Marica Perišić	Aleksandra Andrić; Jovana Čakarević	Jovana Stjepanović; Milica Žabić
Turkey	Bilal Çiloğlu; İbrahim Demirel	Vedat Albayrak; Muhammed Koç	Recep Ergin; İbrahim Tataroğlu	Hasret Bozkurt	Minel Akdeniz; Fidan Ögel	Hilal Öztürk

== Results ==
=== Main draw ===
Round of 16
Serbia	0
IJF	4
Italy	4
Poland	0
Netherlands	2
Belgium	4
Georgia	4
Azerbaijan	0
Austria	4
Montenegro	1
Germany	4
Croatia	2
Hungary	3
Turkey	4

Quarter-finals
France	1
IJF	4
Italy	4
Belgium	1
Georgia	4
Austria	1
Germany	4
Turkey	3

Semi-finals
IJF	1
Italy	4
Georgia	4
Germany	0

Final
Italy	3
Georgia	4

=== Repechage ===
Repechage
France	2
Belgium	4
Austria	0
Turkey	4

Bronze medal
Belgium	3
Germany	4
Turkey	0
IJF	4

== Matches ==
=== Round of 16 ===
==== Serbia vs International Judo Federation Team ====
Weight Class	Serbia	Result	IJF	Score
Women +70 kg	Milica Žabić	012 (yellow card) – 100 (yellow card)	Elis Startseva	0 – 1
Men +90 kg	Aleksandar Kukolj	000 – 110	Denis Batchaev	0 – 2
Women –57 kg	Marica Perišić	000 – 100	Irina Zueva	0 – 3
Men –73 kg	Bogdan Veličković	000 (yellow card) – 100	Karen Galstian	0 – 4
Women –70 kg	Jovana Čakarević	—	Daria Antonova	—
Men –90 kg	Nemanja Majdov	—	Mansur Lorsanov	—

==== Italy vs Poland ====
Weight Class	Italy	Result	Poland	Score
Women +70 kg	Asya Tavano	020 – 000	Kinga Wolszczak	1 – 0
Men +90 kg	Gennaro Pirelli	010 (yellow card) – 000 (yellow card)	Grzegorz Teresiński	2 – 0
Women –57 kg	Odette Giuffrida	100 – 000 (yellow card)	Arleta Podolak	3 – 0
Men –73 kg	Giovanni Esposito	010 (yellow card) – 000 (yellow card)	Wiktor Mrówczyński	4 – 0
Women –70 kg	Irene Pedrotti	—	Natalia Kropska	—
Men –90 kg	Kenny Komi Bedel	—	Jakub Pankowski	—

==== Netherlands vs Belgium ====
Weight Class	Netherlands	Result	Belgium	Score
Women +70 kg	Marit Kamps	001 – 000	Gabrielle Bouvier	1 – 0
Men +90 kg	Jur Spijkers	000 – 111	Toma Nikiforov	1 – 1
Women –57 kg	Shannon van de Meeberg	010 – 000 (yellow card)	Luna Verfaillie	2 – 1
Men –73 kg	Niels Thijssen	000 – 100 (yellow card)	Zelemkhan Batchaev	2 – 2
Women –70 kg	Margit de Voogd	000 (yellow card) – 100 (yellow card)	Gabriella Willems	2 – 3
Men –90 kg	Markus van Dijk	000 – 101	Matthias Casse	2 – 4

==== Georgia vs Azerbaijan ====
Weight Class	Georgia	Result	Azerbaijan	Score
Women +70 kg	Sophio Somkhishvili	101 (yellow card) – 000	Nigar Suleymanova	1 – 0
Men +90 kg	Guram Tushishvili	020 – 010 (yellow card)	Zelym Kotsoiev	2 – 0
Women –57 kg	Eteri Liparteliani	100 – 000	Fidan Alizada	3 – 0
Men –73 kg	Lasha Shavdatuashvili	110 – 000	Rashid Mammadaliyev	4 – 0
Women –70 kg	Mariam Tchanturia	—	Sudaba Aghayeva	—
Men –90 kg	Luka Maisuradze	—	Zelim Tckaev	—

==== Austria vs Montenegro ====
Weight Class	Austria	Result	Montenegro	Score
Women +70 kg	Maria Höllwart	000 – 100 (yellow card)	Jovana Peković	0 – 1
Men +90 kg	Stephan Hegyi	100 – 000	Slobodan Vukić	1 – 1
Women –57 kg	Verena Hiden	100 – 000	Aiša Nurković	2 – 1
Men –73 kg	Samuel Gaßner	111 (yellow card) – 000 (yellow card)	Jahja Nurković	3 – 1
Women –70 kg	Lisa Tretnjak	010 – 000 (yellow card)	Nataša Jeftić	4 – 1
Men –90 kg	Bernd Fasching	—	Nebojša Gardašević	—

==== Germany vs Croatia ====
Weight Class	Germany	Result	Croatia	Score
Women +70 kg	Samira Bouizgarne	000 – 010 (yellow card)	Tina Radić	0 – 1
Men +90 kg	Losseni Kone	100 – 000	Mikita Sviryd	1 – 1
Women –57 kg	Seija Ballhaus	110 (yellow card) – 001	Ana Viktorija Puljiz	2 – 1
Men –73 kg	Jano Rübo	001 (yellow card) – 000	Robert Klačar	3 – 1
Women –70 kg	Dena Pohl	000 (yellow card) – 001	Lara Cvjetko	3 – 2
Men –90 kg	Timo Cavelius	010 (yellow card) – 000	Josip Bulić	4 – 2

==== Hungary vs Turkey ====
Weight Class	Hungary	Result	Turkey	Score
Women +70 kg	Jennifer Czerlau	011 – 010	Hilal Öztürk	1 – 0
Men +90 kg	Mihály Cserkaszov	000 – 001	İbrahim Tataroğlu	1 – 1
Women –57 kg	Kitti Kovács	000 – 110	Hasret Bozkurt	1 – 2
Men –73 kg	Áron Szabó	001 – 000 (yellow card)	Bilal Çiloğlu	2 – 2
Women –70 kg	Szofi Özbas	010 – 000 (yellow card)	Fidan Ögel	3 – 2
Men –90 kg	Gergely Nerpel	000 (yellow card) – 100 (yellow card)	Vedat Albayrak	3 – 3
Women +70 kg	Jennifer Czerlau	000 – 001	Hilal Öztürk	3 – 4

=== Quarter-finals ===
==== France vs International Judo Federation Team ====
Weight Class	France	Result	IJF	Score
Men +90 kg	Mathéo Akiana Mongo	000 – 100	Tamerlan Bashaev	0 – 1
Women –57 kg	Ophélie Vellozzi	000 – 010	Daria Kurbonmamadova	0 – 2
Men –73 kg	Eliot Preve	000 (yellow card) – 010	Danil Lavrentev	0 – 3
Women –70 kg	Marie-Ève Gahié	001 (yellow card) – 000	Daria Antonova	1 – 3
Men –90 kg	Alexis Mathieu	000 – 020	Timur Arbuzov	1 – 4
Women +70 kg	Romane Dicko	—	Mariia Ivanova	—

==== Italy vs Belgium ====
Weight Class	Italy	Result	Belgium	Score
Men +90 kg	Gennaro Pirelli	001 – 000	Yves Ndao	1 – 0
Women –57 kg	Veronica Toniolo	001 (yellow card) – 000 (yellow card)	Luna Verfaillie	2 – 0
Men –73 kg	Manuel Lombardo	010 (yellow card) – 000 (yellow card)	Zelemkhan Batchaev	3 – 0
Women –70 kg	Giorgia Stangherlin	000 – 100 (yellow card)	Gabriella Willems	3 – 1
Men –90 kg	Christian Parlati	103 – 000	Noah Christiaens	4 – 1
Women +70 kg	Asya Tavano	—	Gabrielle Bouvier	—

==== Georgia vs Austria ====
Weight Class	Georgia	Result	Austria	Score
Men +90 kg	Guram Tushishvili	100 – 000 (yellow card)	Stephan Hegyi	1 – 0
Women –57 kg	Eteri Liparteliani	100 – 000	Verena Hiden	2 – 0
Men –73 kg	Lasha Shavdatuashvili	000 – 101	Samuel Gaßner	2 – 1
Women –70 kg	Mariam Tchanturia	100 (yellow card) – 000 (yellow card)	Lisa Tretnjak	3 – 1
Men –90 kg	Luka Maisuradze	001 (yellow card) – 000	Bernd Fasching	4 – 1
Women +70 kg	Sophio Somkhishvili	—	Maria Höllwart	—

==== Germany vs Turkey ====
Weight Class	Germany	Result	Turkey	Score
Men +90 kg	Erik Abramov	100 – 000	İbrahim Tataroğlu	1 – 0
Women –57 kg	Pauline Starke	011 – 100	Hasret Bozkurt	1 – 1
Men –73 kg	Igor Wandtke	001 – 000	Bilal Çiloğlu	2 – 1
Women –70 kg	Dena Pohl	000 – 010 (yellow card)	Fidan Ögel	2 – 2
Men –90 kg	Fabian Kansy	000 – 001 (yellow card)	Vedat Albayrak	2 – 3
Women +70 kg	Samira Bouizgarne	100 – 012	Hilal Öztürk	3 – 3
Men +90 kg	Erik Abramov	010 – 000	İbrahim Tataroğlu	4 – 3

=== Semi-finals ===
==== International Judo Federation Team vs Italy ====
Weight Class	IJF	Result	Italy	Score
Women –57 kg	Irina Zueva	000 – 001 (yellow card)	Odette Giuffrida	0 – 1
Men –73 kg	Danil Lavrentev	000 – 100	Giovanni Esposito	0 – 2
Women –70 kg	Daria Antonova	001 – 000	Irene Pedrotti	1 – 2
Men –90 kg	Mansur Lorsanov	000 (yellow card) – 001 (yellow card)	Kenny Komi Bedel	1 – 3
Women +70 kg	Elis Startseva	000 (yellow card) – 101	Asya Tavano	1 – 4
Men +90 kg	Tamerlan Bashaev	—	Gennaro Pirelli	—

==== Georgia vs Germany ====
Weight Class	Georgia	Result	Germany	Score
Women –57 kg	Eteri Liparteliani	100 – 000	Seija Ballhaus	1 – 0
Men –73 kg	Mikheili Bakhbakhashvili	020 – 000	Igor Wandtke	2 – 0
Women –70 kg	Mariam Tchanturia	001 (yellow card) – 000	Dena Pohl	3 – 0
Men –90 kg	Luka Maisuradze	010 – 000	Timo Cavelius	4 – 0
Women +70 kg	Sophio Somkhishvili	—	Anna Monta Olek	—
Men +90 kg	Guram Tushishvili	—	Losseni Kone	—

=== Repechage ===
==== France vs Belgium ====
Weight Class	France	Result	Belgium	Score
Women –57 kg	Ophélie Vellozzi	020 (yellow card) – 000	Luna Verfaillie	1 – 0
Men –73 kg	Eliot Preve	000 – 100	Zelemkhan Batchaev	1 – 1
Women –70 kg	Clarisse Agbegnenou	000 – 100	Gabriella Willems	1 – 2
Men –90 kg	Alexis Mathieu	010 – 100	Noah Christiaens	1 – 3
Women +70 kg	Romane Dicko	020 – 000	Gabrielle Bouvier	2 – 3
Men +90 kg	Tieman Diaby	000 (yellow card) – 100	Toma Nikiforov	2 – 4

==== Austria vs Turkey ====
Weight Class	Austria	Result	Turkey	Score
Women –57 kg	Verena Hiden	000 – 003	Hasret Bozkurt	0 – 1
Men –73 kg	Samuel Gaßner	000 – 110	İbrahim Demirel	0 – 2
Women –70 kg	Lisa Tretnjak	000 – 020	Fidan Ögel	0 – 3
Men –90 kg	Bernd Fasching	000 – 100	Vedat Albayrak	0 – 4
Women +70 kg	Maria Höllwart	—	Hilal Öztürk	—
Men +90 kg	Movli Borchashvilli	—	Recep Ergin	—

=== Bronze medal matches ===
==== Belgium vs Germany ====
Weight Class	Belgium	Result	Germany	Score
Men –73 kg	Zelemkhan Batchaev	000 (yellow card) – 100	Jano Rübo	0 – 1
Women –70 kg	Gabriella Willems	111 – 000 (yellow card)	Friederike Stolze	1 – 1
Men –90 kg	Matthias Casse	100 (yellow card) – 000	Fabian Kansy	2 – 1
Women +70 kg	Gabrielle Bouvier	000 – 100	Anna Monta Olek	2 – 2
Men +90 kg	Toma Nikiforov	100 – 000	Erik Abramov	3 – 2
Women –57 kg	Luna Verfaillie	000 – 010	Seija Ballhaus	3 – 3
Men +90 kg	Toma Nikiforov	000 – 001	Erik Abramov	3 – 4

==== Turkey vs International Judo Federation Team ====
Weight Class	Turkey	Result	IJF	Score
Men –73 kg	Bilal Çiloğlu	000 – 100	Karen Galstian	0 – 1
Women –70 kg	Fidan Ögel	001 (yellow card) – 022	Tamara Lishchenko	0 – 2
Men –90 kg	Vedat Albayrak	000 – 010 (yellow card)	Mansur Lorsanov	0 – 3
Women +70 kg	Hilal Öztürk	000 – 110	Mariia Ivanova	1 – 3
Men +90 kg	Recep Ergin	—	Denis Batchaev	—
Women –57 kg	Hasret Bozkurt	—	Irina Zueva	—

=== Gold medal match – Italy vs Georgia ===
Weight Class	Italy	Result	Georgia	Score
Men –73 kg	Manuel Lombardo	101 (yellow card) – 000	Mikheili Bakhbakhashvili	1 – 0
Women –70 kg	Giorgia Stangherlin	000 – 001	Mariam Tchanturia	1 – 1
Men –90 kg	Christian Parlati	100 – 000 (yellow card)	Luka Maisuradze	2 – 1
Women +70 kg	Asya Tavano	101 – 000 (yellow card)	Sophio Somkhishvili	3 – 1
Men +90 kg	Gennaro Pirelli	000 – 100	Guram Tushishvili	3 – 2
Women –57 kg	Veronica Toniolo	000 – 100 (yellow card)	Eteri Liparteliani	3 – 3
Women +70 kg	Asya Tavano	000 – 001	Sophio Somkhishvili	3 – 4
