= 2022 European Judo Championships – Men's 73 kg =

Judo competition

Judo Men's 73 kg at the 2022 European Judo Championships
- Venue: Armeets Arena
- Location: Sofia, Bulgaria
- Date: 30 April
- Competitors: 34 from 23 nations

Medalists
| gold medal | Hidayat Heydarov (2nd title) | Azerbaijan |
| silver medal | Giovanni Esposito | Italy |
| bronze medal | Mark Hristov | Bulgaria |
| bronze medal | Rustam Orujov | Azerbaijan |

Competition at external databases
- Links: IJF • JudoInside

The men's 73 kg competition at the 2022 European Judo Championships was held on 30 April at the Armeets Arena.

== Results ==
=== Finals ===
Semi-finals
Giovanni Esposito (ITA) | 10
Adrian Şulcă (ROU) | 00
Hidayat Heydarov (AZE) | 01
Mark Hristov (BUL) | 00

Final
Giovanni Esposito (ITA) | 00
Hidayat Heydarov (AZE) | 01

=== Repechage ===
Repechage
Salvador Cases (ESP) | 10
Petru Pelivan (MDA) | 01
Alexandru Raicu (ROU) | 00
Rustam Orujov (AZE) | 01

Bronze medal
Salvador Cases (ESP) | 00
Mark Hristov (BUL) | 01
Rustam Orujov (AZE) | 01
Adrian Şulcă (ROU) | 00

=== Pool A ===
First round

Round of 32
Lasha Shavdatuashvili (GEO) | 10
Indrit Cullhaj (ALB) | 00
Giovanni Esposito (ITA) | 10
Juš Mecilošek (SLO) | 00
Salvador Cases (ESP) | 10
Daniel Powell (GBR) | 00
Kyprianos Andreou (CYP) | 01
Wiktor Mrówczyński (POL) | 00

Round of 16
Lasha Shavdatuashvili (GEO) | 00
Giovanni Esposito (ITA) | 10
Salvador Cases (ESP) | 10
Kyprianos Andreou (CYP) | 00

Quarterfinals
Giovanni Esposito (ITA) | 10
Salvador Cases (ESP) | 00

=== Pool B ===
First round
Théo Riquin (FRA) | 00
Filip Jovanović (SRB) | 10

Round of 32
Tohar Butbul (ISR) | 01
Filip Jovanović (SRB) | 00
Petru Pelivan (MDA) | 10
Lukas Vennekold (GER) | 00
Akil Gjakova (KOS) | 00
Arsen Avedisyan (ARM) | 10
Stavros Doumas (GRE) | 00
Adrian Şulcă (ROU) | 11

Round of 16
Tohar Butbul (ISR) | 00
Petru Pelivan (MDA) | 10
Arsen Avedisyan (ARM) | 00
Adrian Şulcă (ROU) | 01

Quarterfinals
Petru Pelivan (MDA) | 00
Adrian Şulcă (ROU) | 11

=== Pool C ===
First round
Fabio Basile (ITA) | 10
João Crisóstomo (POR) | 00

Round of 32
Hidayat Heydarov (AZE) | 10
Adam Stodolski (POL) | 00
Martin Hojak (SLO) | 10
Fabio Basile (ITA) | 00
Alexandru Raicu (ROU) | 10
Ferdinand Karapetian (ARM) | 00
Umalt Demirel (TUR) | 00
Igor Wandtke (GER) | 10

Round of 16
Hidayat Heydarov (AZE) | 01
Martin Hojak (SLO) | 00
Alexandru Raicu (ROU) | 01
Igor Wandtke (GER) | 00

Quarterfinals
Hidayat Heydarov (AZE) | 01
Alexandru Raicu (ROU) | 00

=== Pool D ===
First round

Round of 32
Victor Sterpu (MDA) | 01
Mark Hristov (BUL) | 11
Benjamin Axus (FRA) | 11
Ido Levin (ISR) | 00
Rustam Orujov (AZE) | 01
Joshua Green (IRL) | 00
Oleksandr Koshliak (UKR) | 10
Michail Tsoutlasvili (GRE) | 00

Round of 16
Mark Hristov (BUL) | 01
Benjamin Axus (FRA) | 00
Rustam Orujov (AZE) | 10
Oleksandr Koshliak (UKR) | 00

Quarterfinals
Mark Hristov (BUL) | 10
Rustam Orujov (AZE) | 00
