= Kosovo at the 2024 Summer Olympics =

- Kosovar flag
- IOC code: KOS
- NOC: Olympic Committee of Kosovo
- Website: noc-kosovo.org (in Albanian and Serbian)

in Paris 26 July 2024 – 11 August 2024
- Competitors: 9 (2 men and 7 women) in 4 sports
- Flag bearers (opening): Nora Gjakova & Akil Gjakova
- Flag bearers (closing): Adell Sabovic & Gresa Bakraçi
- Medals Ranked 73rd: Gold 0 Silver 1 Bronze 1 Total 2

Summer Olympics appearances (overview)
- 2016; 2020; 2024

Other related appearances
- Yugoslavia (1920–1992W); Independent Olympic Participants (1992S); Serbia and Montenegro (1996–2006); Serbia (2008–2012)

Kosovo competed at the 2024 Summer Olympics in Paris from 26 July to 11 August 2024. This was the nation's third appearance at the Summer Olympics, since its debut in 2016. The delegation consisted of nine athletes across four sports. The Olympic Committee of Kosovo was formed in 1992 and became a full member of the IOC in 2014.

Kosovo won two medals during the Paris Olympics, their first ever silver and bronze medals. Nora and Akil Gjakova were the flagbearers in the opening ceremony, and Adell Sabovic and Gresa Bakraçi were the flagbearers at the closing ceremony. Distria Krasniqi earned a silver medal in judo and Laura Fazliu got a bronze in the same sport.

== Background ==
In past Olympic Games, athletes born in what is now Kosovo participated as part of the Yugoslavian team. In the 1960 Summer Olympics, three football players born from Kosovo (Milutin Šoškić, Fahrudin Jusufi, and Vladimir Durković) won gold as part of the Yugoslavia national team. The first individual athlete from Kosovo who competed for Yugoslavia at the Olympics was boxer Mehmet Bogujevci in the 1980 Summer Olympics men's welterweight category, reaching the quarterfinals.

After the breakup of Yugoslavia, the Olympic Committee of Kosovo was officially established in 1992. In April 2013, the Brussels Agreement was concluded between the Serbian and Kosovan governments. Kosovo was recognised as a provisional member of the IOC on 22 October 2014, before becoming a full member on 9 December 2014. Kosovo competed in its first Olympics in 2016. Serbia protested Kosovo's admission to the IOC, as it officially claims that Kosovo is an autonomous province of Serbia.

The 2024 Summer Olympics were held from 26 July to 11 August 2024 in Paris, France. This was Kosovo's third Olympic appearance. It sent a delegation of nine athletes. Nora and Akil Gjakova served as the team's flagbearers in the opening ceremony, while Adell Sabovic and Gresa Bakraçi were the flagbearers in the closing ceremony.

== Competitors ==
The following is the list of number of competitors in the Games.

| Sport | Men | Women | Total |
|---|---|---|---|
| Athletics | 0 | 1 | 1 |
| Boxing | 0 | 1 | 1 |
| Judo | 1 | 4 | 5 |
| Swimming | 1 | 1 | 2 |
| Total | 2 | 7 | 9 |

== Medalists ==
| Medal | Name | Sport | Event | Date |
|---|---|---|---|---|
| Silver | Distria Krasniqi | Judo | Women's 52 kg | 28 July |
| Bronze | Laura Fazliu | Judo | Women's 63 kg | 30 July |

Medals by sport
| Sport | 1st place, gold medalist(s) | 2nd place, silver medalist(s) | 3rd place, bronze medalist(s) | Total |
| Judo | 0 | 1 | 1 | 2 |
| Total | 0 | 1 | 1 | 2 |

Medals by gender
| Gender | 1st place, gold medalist(s) | 2nd place, silver medalist(s) | 3rd place, bronze medalist(s) | Total |
| Male | 0 | 0 | 0 | 0 |
| Female | 0 | 1 | 1 | 2 |
| Mixed | 0 | 0 | 0 | 0 |
| Total | 0 | 1 | 1 | 2 |

Medals by date
| Date | 1st place, gold medalist(s) | 2nd place, silver medalist(s) | 3rd place, bronze medalist(s) | Total |
| 28 July | 0 | 1 | 0 | 1 |
| 30 July | 0 | 0 | 1 | 1 |
| Total | 0 | 1 | 1 | 2 |

== Athletics ==
Kosovo was represented by one female athlete at the 2024 Summer Olympics in athletics, Gresa Bakraçi, in the women's 800 metres run. She qualified via universality place. (Note: Universality places are places awarded to countries that send small delegations to the Olympics. They let the nations' best athlete qualify for the Olympics.) This was Bakraçi's debut appearance at the Olympics. On 2 August, she participated in the heats of the women's 800 metre race in heat five. She finished the race in 2:13.29 minutes, last out of eight competitors in her heat, and failed to advanced to the semi-finals, however she did qualify for the repechage round. In the repechage round, which took place on 3 August, Bakraçi was put into heat three. She was disqualified from the race for lane infringement, and failed to advance to the semifinals.

Key

- Note–Ranks given for track events are within the athlete's heat only
- TR17.2.3 = Lane infringement
- DQ = Disqualification

Track and road events

| Athlete | Event | Heat | | Repechage | | Semifinal | | Final | |
| Athlete | Event | Result | Rank | Result | Rank | Result | Rank | Result | Rank |
|---|---|---|---|---|---|---|---|---|---|
| Gresa Bakraçi | Women's 800 m | 2:13.29 | 8 | DQ | TR17.2.3 | Did not advance | | | |

== Boxing ==
Kosovo was represented by one female athlete at the 2024 Summer Olympics in athletics, Donjeta Sadiku, in the women's 60 kg. She secured the spot on the Kosovan squad in her respective weight division by finishing in the top two at the 2024 World Boxing Olympic Qualification Tournament 1 in Busto Arsizio, Italy. This was Sadiku's second appearance at the Olympics. In the round of 32, on July 27, she fought Thananya Somnuek of Thailand and won 3 – 2. Then in the round of 16, on July 29, she fought Angie Valdés of Colombia and lost 2 – 3, failing to advance to the quarterfinals.

| Athlete | Event | Round of 32 | Round of 16 | Quarterfinals | Semifinals | Final | |
| Athlete | Event | Opposition Result | Opposition Result | Opposition Result | Opposition Result | Opposition Result | Rank |
|---|---|---|---|---|---|---|---|
| Donjeta Sadiku | Women's 60 kg | Somnuek (THA); W 3 – 2 | Valdés (COL); L 2 – 3 | Did not advance | | | |

== Judo ==
Kosovo qualified five judokas for the Games. Akil Gjakova, Distria Krasniqi, Nora Gjakova, Laura Fazliu, and Loriana Kuka; all of whom qualified via all of whom qualified through International Judo Federation (IJF) World Ranking List.

On 29 July, Akil Gjakova fought Daniel Cargnin in the Round of 32 and won 10 – 00, advancing to the Round of 16. He then fought Samuel Gassner on the same day and won 10 – 00, advancing to the quarterfinals. In the quarterfinals he defeated Manuel Lombardo 10 – 00, advancing to the semifinals. In the semifinals he fought Hidayat Heydarov and lost 00 – 01, failing to advance but being sent to the bronze medal match. Gjakova fought for the bronze medal against Soichi Hashimoto, losing the match and the medal 00 – 01.

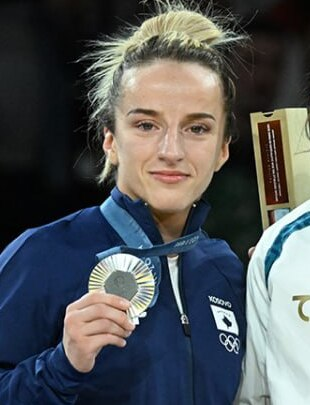
Krasniqi holding her silver medal

Krasniqi received a bye in the Round of 32, advancing to the Round of 16. She then fought Maryam March Maharani on 28 July and won 10 – 00, advancing to the quarterfinals. In the quarterfinals she defeated Gefen Primo 10 – 00 on the same day, advancing to the semifinals. In the semifinals she fought Odette Giuffrida and won 10 – 00, advancing to the final. Krasniqi fought for the gold medal against Diyora Keldiyorova, losing the match 00 – 01 and getting a silver medal.

On 29 July, Nora Gjakova fought Lkhagvatogoogiin Enkhriilen in the Round of 32 and lost 00 – 10, failing to advance to the Round of 16.

Fazliu received a bye in the Round of 32, advancing to the Round of 16. She then fought Tang Jing on 30 July and won 10 – 00, advancing to the quarterfinals. In the quarterfinals she lost to Clarisse Agbegnenou 00 – 10 on the same day, failing to advance but being sent to the repechage round. In the repechage round she fought Catherine Beauchemin-Pinard and won 01 – 00, advancing to the bronze medal match. Fazliu fought for the bronze medal against Katarina Kristo, winning the match and the medal 10 – 00.

On 1 August, Kuka fought Metka Lobnik in the Round of 32 and won 10 – 00, advancing to the Round of 16. She then fought Yelyzaveta Lytvynenko on the same day and lost 00 – 01, failing to advance.

Key

- N/A = Round not applicable for the event
- Bye = Athlete not required to compete in round

| Athlete | Event | Round of 32 | Round of 16 | Quarterfinals | Semifinals | Repechage | Final / BM | |
| Athlete | Event | Opposition Result | Opposition Result | Opposition Result | Opposition Result | Opposition Result | Opposition Result | Rank |
|---|---|---|---|---|---|---|---|---|
| Akil Gjakova | Men's –73 kg | Cargnin (BRA); W 10 – 00 | Gassner (AUT); W 10 – 00 | Lombardo (ITA); W 10 – 00 | Heydarov (AZE); L 00 – 01 | Bye | Hashimoto (JPN); L 00 – 01 | 5 |
| Distria Krasniqi | Women's –52 kg | Bye | Maharani (INA); W 10 – 00 | Primo (ISR); W 10 – 00 | Giuffrida (ITA); W 10 – 00 | Bye | Keldiyorova (UZB); L 00 – 01 | 2nd place, silver medalist(s) |
| Nora Gjakova | Women's –57 kg | Enkhriilen (MGL); L 00 – 10 | Did not advance | | | | | |
| Laura Fazliu | Women's –63 kg | Bye | Tang (CHN); W 10 – 00 | Agbegnenou (FRA); L 00 – 10 | Did not advance | Pinard (CAN); W 01 – 00 | Krišto (CRO); W 10 – 00 | 3rd place, bronze medalist(s) |
| Loriana Kuka | Women's –78 kg | Lobnik (SLO); W 10 – 00 | Lytvynenko (UKR); L 00 – 01 | Did not advance | | | | |

== Swimming ==
Kosovo was represented by one male and one female athlete at the 2024 Summer Olympics in swimming, Adell Sabovic and Hana Beiqi. This was Sabovic's debut appearance at the Olympics; he qualified through a universality place. (Note: Universality places are places awarded to countries that send small delegations to the Olympics. They let the nations' best athlete qualify for the Olympics.) On 30 July, he participated in the heats of the men's 100 m freestyle in heat three. He finished the race in 51:77 seconds, second in his heat and 58th overall, and failed to advance to the semifinals. This was also Beiqi's debut appearance at the Olympics; she qualified through a universality place. (Note: Universality places are places awarded to countries that send small delegations to the Olympics. They let the nations' best athlete qualify for the Olympics.) On 3 August, she participated in the heats of the women's 50 m freestyle in heat six. She finished the race in 27:34 seconds, last in her heat and 43rd overall, and failed to advance to the semifinals.

Key

- N/A = Round not applicable for the event

| Athlete | Event | Heat | | Semifinal | | Final | |
| Athlete | Event | Time | Rank | Time | Rank | Time | Rank |
|---|---|---|---|---|---|---|---|
| Adell Sabovic | Men's 100 m freestyle | 51:77 | 58 | Did not advance | | | |
| Hana Beiqi | Women's 50 m freestyle | 27:34 | 43 | Did not advance | | | |
