= Nils Stump =

Swiss judoka (born 1997)

Personal information
- Born: 12 April 1997 (age 29) Wattwil, Switzerland
- Occupation: Judoka
- Height: 173 cm (5 ft 8 in)

Sport
- Country: Switzerland
- Sport: Judo
- Weight class: ‍–‍73 kg
- Rank: 2nd dan black belt
- Club: Judo Club Uster

Achievements and titles
- Olympic Games: R32 (2020, 2024)
- World Champ.: (2023)
- European Champ.: (bronze) (2021)
Medal record
Men's judo
Representing Switzerland
World Championships
Gold medal – first place	2023 Doha	‍–‍73 kg
Bronze medal – third place	2024 Abu Dhabi	‍–‍73 kg
European Championships
Bronze medal – third place	2021 Lisbon	‍–‍73 kg
IJF Grand Slam
Gold medal – first place	2022 Abu Dhabi	‍–‍73 kg
Gold medal – first place	2023 Tel Aviv	‍–‍73 kg
Gold medal – first place	2024 Dushanbe	‍–‍73 kg
Gold medal – first place	2025 Astana	‍–‍73 kg
Gold medal – first place	2025 Abu Dhabi	‍–‍73 kg
Silver medal – second place	2020 Budapest	‍–‍73 kg
Bronze medal – third place	2023 Tashkent	‍–‍73 kg
IJF Grand Prix
Bronze medal – third place	2018 Tbilisi	‍–‍73 kg
Bronze medal – third place	2020 Tel Aviv	‍–‍73 kg
Bronze medal – third place	2025 Lima	‍–‍73 kg
European U23 Championships
Bronze medal – third place	2016 Tel Aviv	‍–‍66 kg
European Junior Championships
Bronze medal – third place	2016 Málaga	‍–‍66 kg

Profile at external databases
- IJF: 19854
- JudoInside.com: 86217
- Updated on 29 November 2025

Nils Stump (born 12 April 1997) is a Swiss judoka. He won the gold medal in the men's 73 kg event at the 2023 World Judo Championships held in Doha, Qatar. He is a bronze medalist at the 2021 European Judo Championships held in Lisbon, Portugal. He also competed at the 2020 Summer Olympics in Tokyo, Japan and the 2024 Summer Olympics in Paris, France.

== Career ==
In 2021, Stump won one of the bronze medals in the men's 73 kg event at the European Judo Championships held in Lisbon, Portugal. He defeated Giovanni Esposito of Italy in his bronze medal match.

Stump also competed in the men's 73 kg event at the 2021 World Judo Championships held in Budapest, Hungary. In July 2021, he competed in the men's 73 kg event at the 2020 Summer Olympics in Tokyo, Japan where he was eliminated in his first match.

In October 2022, Stump won the 2022 Abu Dhabi Grand Slam and he became the first Swiss judoka to win a Grand Slam tournament in the IJF World Tour.

Stump won the gold medal in the men's 73 kg event at the 2023 World Judo Championships held in Doha, Qatar. He defeated Manuel Lombardo of Italy in his gold medal match. He became the first Swiss judoka to win gold at the World Judo Championships.

He won one of the bronze medals in the men's 73 kg event at the 2024 World Judo Championships held in Abu Dhabi, United Arab Emirates. He defeated Igor Wandtke of Germany in his bronze medal match.

== Achievements ==
Year	Tournament	Place	Weight class
2021	European Championships	3rd	−73 kg
2023	World Championships	1st	−73 kg
2024	World Championships	3rd	−73 kg
