= Judo at the 2024 Summer Olympics – Men's 73 kg =

Judo Men's 73 kg at the Games of the XXXIII Olympiad
- Venue: Grand Palais Éphémère
- Location: Paris, France
- Date: 29 July 2024
- Competitors: 30 from 30 nations
- Website: Official website

Medalists
gold medal	Hidayat Heydarov (1st title)	Azerbaijan
silver medal	Joan-Benjamin Gaba	France
bronze medal	Adil Osmanov	Moldova
bronze medal	Soichi Hashimoto	Japan

Competition at external databases
- Links: IJF • JudoInside

The Men's 73 kg event in Judo at the 2024 Summer Olympics was held at the Grand Palais Éphémère in Paris, France on 29 July 2024.

== Summary ==
This is the fifteenth appearance of the men's lightweight category.

Defending champion Shohei Ono did not participate in this edition as he retired from judo in December 2022, Lasha Shavdatuashvili lost to potentially silver medalist Joan-Benjamin Gaba, 2020 bronze medalists, An Chang-rim and Tsend-Ochiryn Tsogtbaatar did not qualify.

== Results ==
=== Finals ===
Semi-finals
Hidayat Heydarov (AZE)	01
Akil Gjakova (KOS)	00
Joan-Benjamin Gaba (FRA)	11 (yellow card)
Adil Osmanov (MDA)	00 (yellow card)

Final
Hidayat Heydarov (AZE)	10
Joan-Benjamin Gaba (FRA)	00

=== Repechage ===
Repechage
Arthur Margelidon (CAN)	00
Manuel Lombardo (ITA)	10
Soichi Hashimoto (JPN)	10
Batzayaagiin Erdenebayar (MGL)	00

Bronze medal
Manuel Lombardo (ITA)	00 (yellow card)
Adil Osmanov (MDA)	10 (yellow card)
Soichi Hashimoto (JPN)	01
Akil Gjakova (KOS)	00

=== Pool A ===
First round
Tohar Butbul (ISR)	w/o
~~Messaoud Dris (ALG)~~	DSQ
Arthur Margelidon (CAN)	01 (yellow card)
Behruzi Khojazoda (TJK)	00
Igor Wandtke (GER)	10
Roldeney De Oliveira (STP)	00

Round of 16
Hidayat Heydarov (AZE)	10
Tohar Butbul (ISR)	00
Arthur Margelidon (CAN)	10
Igor Wandtke (GER)	00

Quarter-finals
Hidayat Heydarov (AZE)	10
Arthur Margelidon (CAN)	00

=== Pool B ===
First round
Manuel Lombardo (ITA)	10 (yellow card)
Adam Stodolski (POL)	00 (yellow card)
Masayuki Terada (THA)	11 (yellow card)
Philippe Metellus (HAI)	00
Daniel Cargnin (BRA)	00 (yellow card)
Akil Gjakova (KOS)	10
Samuel Gaßner (AUT)	10
Hasan Bayan (SYR)	00

Round of 16
Manuel Lombardo (ITA)	01 (yellow card)
Masayuki Terada (THA)	00
Akil Gjakova (KOS)	10 (yellow card)
Samuel Gaßner (AUT)	00 (yellow card)

Quarter-finals
Manuel Lombardo (ITA)	00
Akil Gjakova (KOS)	10 (yellow card)

=== Pool C ===
First round
Mark Hristov (BUL)	10
Aden-Alexandre Houssein (DJI)	00
Lasha Shavdatuashvili (GEO)	00
Joan-Benjamin Gaba (FRA)	10
Andrew Thomas Mlugu (TAN)	10 (yellow card)
William Tai Tin (SAM)	01

Round of 16
Soichi Hashimoto (JPN)	01 (yellow card)
Mark Hristov (BUL)	00
Joan-Benjamin Gaba (FRA)	10
Andrew Thomas Mlugu (TAN)	00

Quarter-finals
Soichi Hashimoto (JPN)	00
Joan-Benjamin Gaba (FRA)	10 (yellow card)

=== Pool D ===
First round
Nils Stump (SUI)	00
Batzayaagiin Erdenebayar (MGL)	01
Salvador Cases (ESP)	10
Faye Njie (GAM)	00
Murodjon Yuldoshev (UZB)	10 (yellow card)
Daniyar Shamshayev (KAZ)	00
Jack Yonezuka (USA)	00
Adil Osmanov (MDA)	10

Round of 16
Batzayaagiin Erdenebayar (MGL)	01
Salvador Cases (ESP)	00 (yellow card)
Murodjon Yuldoshev (UZB)	00
Adil Osmanov (MDA)	10

Quarter-finals
Batzayaagiin Erdenebayar (MGL)	00
Adil Osmanov (MDA)	10 (yellow card)
