= Adil Osmanov =

Moldovan judoka (born 2000)

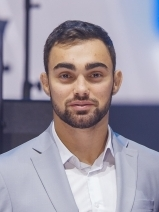
- Osmanov in 2024

Personal information
- Born: 2 July 2000 (age 26) Moscow, Russia
- Occupation: Judoka
- Height: 175 cm (5 ft 9 in)

Sport
- Country: Moldova
- Sport: Judo
- Weight class: ‍–‍73 kg

Achievements and titles
- Olympic Games: (bronze) (2024)
- World Champ.: R16 (2024)
- European Champ.: 5th (2023, 2024)
Medal record
Men's judo
Representing Moldova
Olympic Games
Bronze medal – third place	2024 Paris	‍–‍73 kg
IJF Grand Slam
Gold medal – first place	2024 Antalya	‍–‍73 kg
IJF Grand Prix
Gold medal – first place	2024 Linz	‍–‍73 kg
Bronze medal – third place	2023 Linz	‍–‍73 kg
World University Games
Gold medal – first place	2025 Essen	‍–‍73 kg
European U23 Championships
Bronze medal – third place	2021 Budapest	‍–‍73 kg
Bronze medal – third place	2022 Sarajevo	‍–‍73 kg
European Junior Championships
Silver medal – second place	2019 Vantaa	‍–‍66 kg

Profile at external databases
- IJF: 38271
- JudoInside.com: 114070
- Updated on 29 July 2025

Adil Osmanov (born 2 July 2000) is a Moldovan judoka. He won a bronze medal at the 2024 Summer Olympics.

== Early and personal life ==
Osmanov was born in Moscow to an Azerbaijani father and a Moldovan mother, from the city of Drochia. His parents lived in Azerbaijan before he was born. He has family in Baku, and in Khachmaz, where his father was born. He started practicing the sport of judoka in Moscow and his first few judo fights were as part of the Russian Federation. He moved to Chișinău in Moldova in 2017 after choosing to represent them internationally, initially on his own, although his mother later moved back to Moldova as well. His father died in 2023. Alongside being a judoka, he works for the General Inspectorate of Carabinieri in Moldova.

== Career ==
He is coached by former Olympic Judoka Valeriu Duminică. In 2021, he won a bronze medal at the 2021 European U23 Judo Championships in Budapest. He again won bronze at the European U23 Championship in 2022, in Sarajevo.

He secured a silver medal at the European Open in Warsaw in 2023. He won the bronze medal at the 2023 Grand Prix Upper Austria.

He won the 73kg category at the 2024 Grand Prix Upper Austria in Linz, defeating Koen Heg of the Netherlands in the semi-final and Rashid Mammadaliyev of Azerbaijan in the final. He followed that with victory at the 2024 Grand Slam of Antalya. This was a first gold medal for Osmanov in a Grand Slam event, and came about a few weeks after his first gold medal in a Grand Prix event.

Competing at the 2024 Summer Olympics, he won the bronze medal in the 73kg defeating Italy's Manuel Lombardo in the bronze medal match. He celebrated his victory with a fist pump so fierce it was reported that he may have dislocated his shoulder.
