= 2024 Judo Grand Slam Astana =

Judo competition

Judo 2024 Judo Grand Slam Astana
- Venue: Zhaksylyk Ushkempirov Martial Arts Palace
- Location: Astana, Kazakhstan
- Dates: 10–12 May 2024
- Competitors: 503 from 89 nations
- Total prize money: €154,000

Competition at external databases
- Links: IJF • EJU • JudoInside

The 2024 Judo Grand Slam Astana is a Judo Grand Slam tournament that was to be held at the Zhaksylyk Ushkempirov Martial Arts Palace in the city of Astana, Kazakhstan and later moved to be held in Astana, Kazakhstan, from 10 to 12 May 2024 as part of the IJF World Tour and during the 2024 Summer Olympics qualification period.

== Medal summary ==
=== Men's events ===
Event	Gold	Silver	Bronze
Extra-lightweight (−60 kg)	Ramazan Abdulaev (AIN)	Yang Yung-wei (TPE)	Andrea Carlino (ITA)
Extra-lightweight (−60 kg)	Ramazan Abdulaev (AIN)	Yang Yung-wei (TPE)	Yeldos Smetov (KAZ)
Half-lightweight (−66 kg)	Murad Chopanov (AIN)	Matteo Piras (ITA)	Kamran Suleymanov (AZE)
Half-lightweight (−66 kg)	Murad Chopanov (AIN)	Matteo Piras (ITA)	Luukas Saha (FIN)
Lightweight (−73 kg)	Manuel Lombardo (ITA)	Danil Lavrentev (AIN)	Makhmadbek Makhmadbekov (AIN)
Lightweight (−73 kg)	Manuel Lombardo (ITA)	Danil Lavrentev (AIN)	Bakhitzhan Abdurakhmanov (KAZ)
Half-middleweight (−81 kg)	Sharofiddin Boltaboev (UZB)	Timo Cavelius (GER)	Abylaikhan Zhubanazar (KAZ)
Half-middleweight (−81 kg)	Sharofiddin Boltaboev (UZB)	Timo Cavelius (GER)	Sotaro Fujiwara (JPN)
Middleweight (−90 kg)	Yahor Varapayeu (AIN)	Eduard Trippel (GER)	Eljan Hajiyev (AZE)
Middleweight (−90 kg)	Yahor Varapayeu (AIN)	Eduard Trippel (GER)	Vugar Talibov (AZE)
Half-heavyweight (−100 kg)	Aaron Wolf (JPN)	Daniel Eich (SUI)	Jorge Fonseca (POR)
Half-heavyweight (−100 kg)	Aaron Wolf (JPN)	Daniel Eich (SUI)	Peter Paltchik (ISR)
Heavyweight (+100 kg)	Tatsuru Saito (JPN)	Temur Rakhimov (TJK)	Jur Spijkers (NED)
Heavyweight (+100 kg)	Tatsuru Saito (JPN)	Temur Rakhimov (TJK)	İbrahim Tataroğlu (TUR)

Source results:

=== Women's events ===
Event	Gold	Silver	Bronze
Extra-lightweight (−48 kg)	Galiya Tynbayeva (KAZ)	Sabina Giliazova (AIN)	Tuğçe Beder (TUR)
Extra-lightweight (−48 kg)	Galiya Tynbayeva (KAZ)	Sabina Giliazova (AIN)	Shirine Boukli (FRA)
Half-lightweight (−52 kg)	Gefen Primo (ISR)	Larissa Pimenta (BRA)	Ayumi Leiva Sánchez (ESP)
Half-lightweight (−52 kg)	Gefen Primo (ISR)	Larissa Pimenta (BRA)	Zhu Yeqing (CHN)
Lightweight (−57 kg)	Christa Deguchi (CAN)	Rafaela Silva (BRA)	Haruka Funakubo (JPN)
Lightweight (−57 kg)	Christa Deguchi (CAN)	Rafaela Silva (BRA)	Sarah-Léonie Cysique (FRA)
Half-middleweight (−63 kg)	Katarina Krišto (CRO)	Andreja Leški (SLO)	Minami Aono (JPN)
Half-middleweight (−63 kg)	Katarina Krišto (CRO)	Andreja Leški (SLO)	Dena Pohl (GER)
Middleweight (−70 kg)	Tais Pina (POR)	Lara Cvjetko (CRO)	Katie-Jemima Yeats-Brown (GBR)
Middleweight (−70 kg)	Tais Pina (POR)	Lara Cvjetko (CRO)	Kim Polling (ITA)
Half-heavyweight (−78 kg)	Ma Zhenzhao (CHN)	Anna Monta Olek (GER)	Emma Reid (GBR)
Half-heavyweight (−78 kg)	Ma Zhenzhao (CHN)	Anna Monta Olek (GER)	Nadezhda Tatarchenko (AIN)
Heavyweight (+78 kg)	Romane Dicko (FRA)	Su Xin (CHN)	Elis Startseva (AIN)
Heavyweight (+78 kg)	Romane Dicko (FRA)	Su Xin (CHN)	Akira Sone (JPN)

Source results:

=== Medal table ===
* Host nation (Kazakhstan)

Rank	Nation	Gold	Silver	Bronze	Total
–	Individual Neutral Athletes (AIN)	3	2	3	8
1	Japan (JPN)	2	0	4	6
2	Italy (ITA)	1	1	2	4
3	China (CHN)	1	1	1	3
4	Croatia (CRO)	1	1	0	2
5	Kazakhstan (KAZ)*	1	0	3	4
6	France (FRA)	1	0	2	3
7	Israel (ISR)	1	0	1	2
7	Portugal (POR)	1	0	1	2
9	Canada (CAN)	1	0	0	1
9	Uzbekistan (UZB)	1	0	0	1
11	Germany (GER)	0	3	1	4
12	Brazil (BRA)	0	2	0	2
13	Chinese Taipei (TPE)	0	1	0	1
13	Slovenia (SLO)	0	1	0	1
13	Switzerland (SUI)	0	1	0	1
13	Tajikistan (TJK)	0	1	0	1
17	Azerbaijan (AZE)	0	0	3	3
18	Great Britain (GBR)	0	0	2	2
18	Turkey (TUR)	0	0	2	2
20	Finland (FIN)	0	0	1	1
20	Netherlands (NED)	0	0	1	1
20	Spain (ESP)	0	0	1	1
Totals (22 entries)		14	14	28	56

== Prize money ==
The sums written are per medalist, bringing the total prizes awarded to €154,000. (retrieved from:)

Medal	Total	Judoka	Coach
Gold	€5,000	€4,000	€1,000
Silver	€3,000	€2,400	€600
Bronze	€1,500	€1,200	€300
