= William Tai Tin =

Samoan judoka

Personal information
- Born: 11 June 1985 (age 39)
- Occupation: Judoka

Sport
- Country: Samoa
- Sport: Judo
- Weight class: –73 kg

Achievements and titles
- Olympic Games: R32 (2024)
- World Champ.: R64 (2021)
- OJU Champ.: R16 (2022)

Profile at external databases
- IJF: 55426
- JudoInside.com: 141694
- Updated on 29 July 2024

William Tai Tin (born 11 June 1985) is an Australian-Samoan judoka who has represented Samoa at the Commonwealth Games.

Tai Tin is from Siumu and Manono Island, but lives in Melbourne, Australia.

On 14 July 2022 he was selected as part of Samoa's team for the 2022 Commonwealth Games in Birmingham.
