= 2023 Judo Grand Slam Abu Dhabi =

Judo Competition

Judo 2023 Judo Grand Slam Abu Dhabi
- Venue: Mubadala Arena
- Location: Abu Dhabi, United Arab Emirates
- Dates: 24–26 October 2023
- Competitors: 450 from 77 nations
- Total prize money: €154,000

Competition at external databases
- Links: IJF • EJU • JudoInside

The 2023 Judo Grand Slam Abu Dhabi is a Judo Grand Slam tournament that was held in Abu Dhabi, United Arab Emirates, from 24 to 26 October 2023 as part of the IJF World Tour and during the 2024 Summer Olympics qualification period.

== Medal summary ==
=== Men's events ===
Event	Gold	Silver	Bronze
Extra-lightweight (−60 kg)	Cédric Revol (FRA)	Matheus Takaki (BRA)	Francisco Garrigós (ESP)
Extra-lightweight (−60 kg)	Cédric Revol (FRA)	Matheus Takaki (BRA)	Ayub Bliev (AIN)
Half-lightweight (−66 kg)	Vazha Margvelashvili (GEO)	Mukhriddin Tilovov (UZB)	Battogtokhyn Erkhembayar (MGL)
Half-lightweight (−66 kg)	Vazha Margvelashvili (GEO)	Mukhriddin Tilovov (UZB)	Bayanmönkhiin Narmandakh (UAE)
Lightweight (−73 kg)	Shakhram Ahadov (UZB)	Akil Gjakova (KOS)	Makhmadbek Makhmadbekov (AIN)
Lightweight (−73 kg)	Shakhram Ahadov (UZB)	Akil Gjakova (KOS)	Rashid Mammadaliyev (AZE)
Half-middleweight (−81 kg)	David Karapetyan (AIN)	Frank de Wit (NED)	Wachid Borchashvili (AUT)
Half-middleweight (−81 kg)	David Karapetyan (AIN)	Frank de Wit (NED)	Nugzar Tatalashvili (UAE)
Middleweight (−90 kg)	Nemanja Majdov (SRB)	Tristani Mosakhlishvili (ESP)	Giorgi Jabniashvili (GEO)
Middleweight (−90 kg)	Nemanja Majdov (SRB)	Tristani Mosakhlishvili (ESP)	Krisztián Tóth (HUN)
Half-heavyweight (−100 kg)	Arman Adamian (AIN)	Aleksandar Kukolj (SRB)	Aaron Fara (AUT)
Half-heavyweight (−100 kg)	Arman Adamian (AIN)	Aleksandar Kukolj (SRB)	Shady El Nahas (CAN)
Heavyweight (+100 kg)	Inal Tasoev (AIN)	Erik Abramov (GER)	Tamerlan Bashaev (AIN)
Heavyweight (+100 kg)	Inal Tasoev (AIN)	Erik Abramov (GER)	Jelle Snippe (NED)

=== Women's events ===
Event	Gold	Silver	Bronze
Extra-lightweight (−48 kg)	Assunta Scutto (ITA)	Sıla Ersin (TUR)	Blandine Pont (FRA)
Extra-lightweight (−48 kg)	Assunta Scutto (ITA)	Sıla Ersin (TUR)	Leyla Aliyeva (AZE)
Half-lightweight (−52 kg)	Odette Giuffrida (ITA)	Mascha Ballhaus (GER)	Zhu Yeqing (CHN)
Half-lightweight (−52 kg)	Odette Giuffrida (ITA)	Mascha Ballhaus (GER)	Naomi van Krevel (NED)
Lightweight (−57 kg)	Jessica Klimkait (CAN)	Christa Deguchi (CAN)	Jéssica Lima (BRA)
Lightweight (−57 kg)	Jessica Klimkait (CAN)	Christa Deguchi (CAN)	Kseniia Galitskaia (AIN)
Half-middleweight (−63 kg)	Catherine Beauchemin-Pinard (CAN)	Tang Jing (CHN)	Lubjana Piovesana (AUT)
Half-middleweight (−63 kg)	Catherine Beauchemin-Pinard (CAN)	Tang Jing (CHN)	Cristina Cabaña (ESP)
Middleweight (−70 kg)	Madina Taimazova (AIN)	Ida Eriksson (SWE)	Hilde Jager (NED)
Middleweight (−70 kg)	Madina Taimazova (AIN)	Ida Eriksson (SWE)	Aoife Coughlan (AUS)
Half-heavyweight (−78 kg)	Alice Bellandi (ITA)	Fanny Estelle Posvite (FRA)	Alina Böhm (GER)
Half-heavyweight (−78 kg)	Alice Bellandi (ITA)	Fanny Estelle Posvite (FRA)	Anna-Maria Wagner (GER)
Heavyweight (+78 kg)	Rochele Nunes (POR)	Kamila Berlikash (KAZ)	Elis Startseva (AIN)
Heavyweight (+78 kg)	Rochele Nunes (POR)	Kamila Berlikash (KAZ)	Léa Fontaine (FRA)

=== Medal table ===
* Host nation (United Arab Emirates)

Rank	Nation	Gold	Silver	Bronze	Total
–	Individual Neutral Athletes (AIN)	4	0	5	9
1	Italy (ITA)	3	0	0	3
2	Canada (CAN)	2	1	1	4
3	France (FRA)	1	1	2	4
4	Serbia (SRB)	1	1	0	2
4	Uzbekistan (UZB)	1	1	0	2
6	Georgia (GEO)	1	0	1	2
7	Portugal (POR)	1	0	0	1
8	Germany (GER)	0	2	2	4
9	Netherlands (NED)	0	1	3	4
10	Spain (ESP)	0	1	2	3
11	Brazil (BRA)	0	1	1	2
11	China (CHN)	0	1	1	2
13	Kazakhstan (KAZ)	0	1	0	1
13	Kosovo (KOS)	0	1	0	1
13	Sweden (SWE)	0	1	0	1
13	Turkey (TUR)	0	1	0	1
17	Austria (AUT)	0	0	3	3
18	Azerbaijan (AZE)	0	0	2	2
18	United Arab Emirates (UAE)*	0	0	2	2
20	Australia (AUS)	0	0	1	1
20	Hungary (HUN)	0	0	1	1
20	Mongolia (MGL)	0	0	1	1
Totals (22 entries)		14	14	28	56

== Prize money ==
The sums written are per medalist, bringing the total prizes awarded to €154,000. (retrieved from:)

Medal	Total	Judoka	Coach
Gold	€5,000	€4,000	€1,000
Silver	€3,000	€2,400	€600
Bronze	€1,500	€1,200	€300
