= Judo at the 2022 Mediterranean Games – Men's 73 kg =

Judo competitions

Judo Men's 73 kg at the 2022 Mediterranean Games
- Venue: Mohammed Ben Ahmed Convention Centre – Hall 03 and 06
- Location: Oran, Algeria
- Date: 30 June
- Competitors: 13 from 13 nations

Medalists
gold medal	Messaoud Dris	Algeria
silver medal	Hassan Doukkali	Morocco
bronze medal	Aleddine Ben Chalbi	Tunisia
bronze medal	Akil Gjakova	Kosovo

The men's 73 kg competition in judo at the 2022 Mediterranean Games was held on 30 June at the Mohammed Ben Ahmed Convention Centre in Oran.

== Results ==
=== Main bracket ===
Round of 16
Michail Tsoutlasvili (GRE)	10
Enzo Gibelli (FRA)	00
Messaoud Dris (ALG)	11
Indrit Çullhaj (ALB)	00
Umalt Demirel (TUR)	00
Hasan Bayan (SYR)	01
Aleddine Ben Chalbi (TUN)	10
Abdulati Abushagur (LBA)	00
Martin Hojak (SLO)	w/o
Ghady Moussa (LBN)
Hassan Doukkali (MAR)	11
Kyprianos Andreou (CYP)	01

Quarterfinals
Akil Gjakova (KOS)	10
Michail Tsoutlasvili (GRE)	00
Messaoud Dris (ALG)	10
Hasan Bayan (SYR)	00
Manuel Lombardo (ITA)	00
Aleddine Ben Chalbi (TUN)	01
Martin Hojak (SLO)	00
Hassan Doukkali (MAR)	01

Semifinals
Akil Gjakova (KOS)	00
Messaoud Dris (ALG)	10
Aleddine Ben Chalbi (TUN)	00
Hassan Doukkali (MAR)	10

Final
Messaoud Dris (ALG)	10
Hassan Doukkali (MAR)	01

=== Repechage ===
Repechage 1
Indrit Çullhaj (ALB)	00
Hasan Bayan (SYR)	10

Repechage 2
Michail Tsoutlasvili (GRE)	10
Hasan Bayan (SYR)	00

Bronze medal
Michail Tsoutlasvili (GRE)	00
Aleddine Ben Chalbi (TUN)	11

Repechage 1
Abdulati Abushagur (LBA)	00
Manuel Lombardo (ITA)	10
Kyprianos Andreou (CYP)	01
Martin Hojak (SLO)	10

Repechage 2
Manuel Lombardo (ITA)	11
Martin Hojak (SLO)	00

Bronze medal
Manuel Lombardo (ITA)	00
Akil Gjakova (KOS)	01
