= Joshua Green (judoka) =

Irish judoka (born 1999)

Personal information
- Born: 7 December 1999 (age 26)
- Occupation: Judoka

Sport
- Country: Ireland
- Sport: Judo
- Weight class: ‍–‍73 kg

Achievements and titles
- World Champ.: R32 (2025)
- European Champ.: R32 (2020, 2022, 2023, 2024, 2025, 2026)
- Commonwealth Games: (bronze) (2026)
Medal record
Men's judo
Representing Ireland
IJF Grand Prix
Silver medal – second place	2025 Gold Coast	‍–‍73 kg
Silver medal – second place	2026 Zagreb	‍–‍73 kg
Representing Northern Ireland
Commonwealth Games
Bronze medal – third place	2026 Glasgow	‍–‍73 kg

Profile at external databases
- IJF: 22118
- JudoInside.com: 74712
- Updated on 15 November 2026

Joshua Green (born 7 December 1999) is a Northern Irish judoka. He won the bronze medal at the 2026 Commonwealth Games in the 73 kg division.

== Biography ==
Coached by his father Paul, and from Culmore in Derry, he trained at his hometown club Konarakai before later being based at Camberley Judo Club in England. Green had a fifth place finish competing for Northern Ireland at the 2022 Commonwealth Games in Birmingham, England.

Green won a bronze medal in the 73kg category competing for Northern Ireland at the 2026 Commonwealth Games in Glasgow, Scotland, winning his bronze medal match after losing his semi-final to eventual silver medalist Benjamin Levy of England.
