= Danil Lavrentev =

Russian judoka (born 2003)

Personal information
- Native name: Данил Олегович Лаврентьев
- Full name: Danil Olegovich Lavrentev
- Born: 11 April 2003 (age 23) Kurgan, Russia
- Occupation: Judoka
- Height: 173 cm (5 ft 8 in)

Sport
- Country: Russia
- Sport: Judo
- Weight class: ‍–‍73 kg
- Rank: 1st dan black belt

Achievements and titles
- World Champ.: R16 (2026)
- European Champ.: (gold) (2025)
Medal record
Men's judo
Representing Russia
IJF Grand Slam
| Gold medal – first place | 2026 Astana | ‍–‍73 kg |
| Silver medal – second place | 2026 Lausanne | ‍–‍73 kg |
| Bronze medal – third place | 2026 Dushanbe | ‍–‍73 kg |
Representing the IJF
European Championships
| Gold medal – first place | 2025 Podgorica | ‍–‍73 kg |
| Bronze medal – third place | 2025 Podgorica | Mixed team |
IJF Grand Slam
| Silver medal – second place | 2025 Tashkent | ‍–‍73 kg |
| Bronze medal – third place | 2024 Abu Dhabi | ‍–‍73 kg |
| Bronze medal – third place | 2024 Tokyo | ‍–‍73 kg |
Representing Individual Neutral Athletes
European Championships
| Silver medal – second place | 2024 Zagreb | ‍–‍73 kg |
IJF Grand Slam
| Silver medal – second place | 2023 Ulaanbaatar | ‍–‍73 kg |
| Silver medal – second place | 2024 Tashkent | ‍–‍73 kg |
| Silver medal – second place | 2024 Astana | ‍–‍73 kg |
IJF Grand Prix
| Gold medal – first place | 2024 Odivelas | ‍–‍73 kg |
Men's sambo
Representing Russia
World Cadet Championships
| Gold medal – first place | 2019 Riga | ‍–‍66 kg |

Profile at external databases
- IJF: 43308
- JudoInside.com: 121389
- Updated on 6 October 2026

Danil Olegovich Lavrentev (Russian: Данил Олегович Лаврентьев; born 11 April 2003) is a Russian judoka and sambo practitioner. 2025 European champion. U23 Russian national champion.

== Sport career ==
Lavrentev started his sport career in sambo, where he won the 2019 World Cadet Championships in Riga, Latvia. In judo, he has two silver medals at the Grand Slam in Ulaanbaatar and Tashkent. At the 2024 European Championships he came in second place. In October 2024, he was a bronze medalist of the Grand Slam in Abu Dhabi. In March 2025, he was runner-up of the Grand Slam in Tashkent.

== Achievements ==
| Year | Tournament | Place | Weight class |
|---|---|---|---|
| 2023 | Grand Slam Ulaanbaatar | 2nd | −73 kg |
| 2024 | Grand Slam Tashkent | 2nd | −73 kg |
| 2024 | European Championships | 2nd | −73 kg |
| 2024 | Grand Slam Abu Dhabi | 3rd | −73 kg |
| 2025 | Grand Slam Tashkent | 2nd | −73 kg |
| 2025 | European Championships | 1st | −73 kg |
