= Joan-Benjamin Gaba =

French judoka (born 2001)

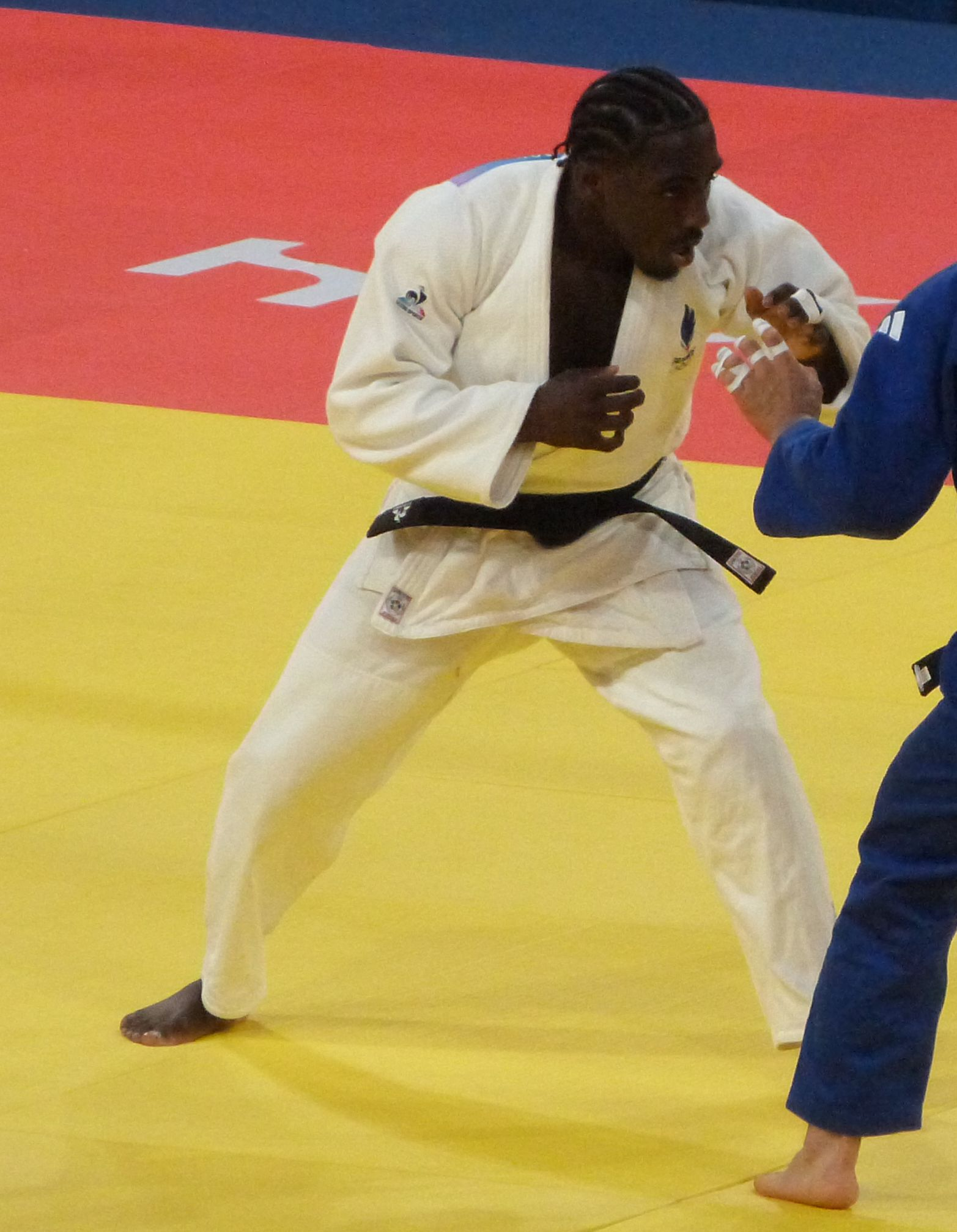
- Gaba in 2024

Personal information
- Born: 7 January 2001 (age 25) Le Chesnay, France
- Occupation: Judoka
- Height: 170 cm (5 ft 7 in)

Sport
- Country: France
- Sport: Judo
- Weight class: ‍–‍73 kg
- Coached by: Karine Petit

Achievements and titles
- Olympic Games: (silver) (2024)
- World Champ.: (gold) (2025)
- European Champ.: (bronze) (2024, 2025)
- Highest world ranking: 1^{st}
Medal record
Men's judo
Representing France
Olympic Games
Gold medal – first place	2024 Paris	Mixed team
Silver medal – second place	2024 Paris	‍–‍73 kg
World Championships
Gold medal – first place	2025 Budapest	‍–‍73 kg
Silver medal – second place	2021 Budapest	Mixed team
Silver medal – second place	2022 Tashkent	Mixed team
Silver medal – second place	2023 Doha	Mixed team
Silver medal – second place	2024 Abu Dhabi	Mixed team
European Championships
Gold medal – first place	2024 Zagreb	Mixed team
Bronze medal – third place	2024 Zagreb	‍–‍73 kg
Bronze medal – third place	2025 Podgorica	‍–‍73 kg
IJF Grand Prix
Bronze medal – third place	2022 Almada	‍–‍73 kg
European U23 Championships
Silver medal – second place	2022 Sarajevo	‍–‍73 kg
World Juniors Championships
Gold medal – first place	2021 Olbia	Mixed team

Profile at external databases
- IJF: 46709
- JudoInside.com: 122378
- Updated on 13 December 2025

Joan-Benjamin Gaba (born 7 January 2001) is a French judoka. He won the silver medal in the men's 73 kg event at the Paris 2024 Summer Olympics as well as the gold medal in the Mixed team event as a member of the French team.

== Personal life ==
Gaba was born in Sèvres, in the Hauts-de-Seine department, into a family with roots in the French overseas department of Martinique.
