= 2025 European Judo Championships =

Judo 2025 European Judo Championships
- Venue: Morača Sports Center
- Location: Podgorica, Montenegro
- Dates: 23–27 April
- Competitors: 414 from 47 nations

Champions
- Mixed team: Georgia (3rd title)

Competition at external databases
- Links: IJF • JudoInside

The 2025 European Judo Championships were held at the Morača Sports Center in Podgorica, Montenegro, from 23 to 27 April 2025 as part of the IJF World Tour.

== Medal table ==
* Host nation (Montenegro)

Rank	Nation	Gold	Silver	Bronze	Total
1	International Judo Federation (IJF)	3	3	2	8
2	France (FRA)	3	2	5	10
3	Georgia (GEO)	3	2	0	5
4	Italy (ITA)	1	3	5	9
5	Germany (GER)	1	1	2	4
6	Portugal (POR)	1	1	0	2
7	Czech Republic (CZE)	1	0	1	2
8	Hungary (HUN)	1	0	0	1
8	Kosovo (KOS)	1	0	0	1
10	Azerbaijan (AZE)	0	1	4	5
11	Greece (GRE)	0	1	0	1
11	Israel (ISR)	0	1	0	1
13	Netherlands (NED)	0	0	3	3
14	Serbia (SRB)	0	0	2	2
15	Belgium (BEL)	0	0	1	1
15	Bulgaria (BUL)	0	0	1	1
15	Croatia (CRO)	0	0	1	1
15	Finland (FIN)	0	0	1	1
15	Spain (ESP)	0	0	1	1
15	Ukraine (UKR)	0	0	1	1
Totals (20 entries)		15	15	30	60

== Medal summary ==
=== Men's events ===
Event	Gold	Silver	Bronze
Extra-lightweight (−60 kg)	Giorgi Sardalashvili; Georgia	Ayub Bliev; International Judo Federation	Ahmad Yusifov; Azerbaijan
Extra-lightweight (−60 kg)	Giorgi Sardalashvili; Georgia	Ayub Bliev; International Judo Federation	Luka Mkheidze; France
Half-lightweight (−66 kg)	Daikii Bouba; France	Murad Chopanov; International Judo Federation	Luukas Saha; Finland
Half-lightweight (−66 kg)	Daikii Bouba; France	Murad Chopanov; International Judo Federation	Walide Khyar; France
Lightweight (−73 kg)	Danil Lavrentev; International Judo Federation	Manuel Lombardo; Italy	Joan-Benjamin Gaba; France
Lightweight (−73 kg)	Danil Lavrentev; International Judo Federation	Manuel Lombardo; Italy	Rashid Mammadaliyev; Azerbaijan
Half-middleweight (−81 kg)	Timur Arbuzov; International Judo Federation	Tato Grigalashvili; Georgia	Matthias Casse; Belgium
Half-middleweight (−81 kg)	Timur Arbuzov; International Judo Federation	Tato Grigalashvili; Georgia	Zelim Tckaev; Azerbaijan
Middleweight (−90 kg)	Christian Parlati; Italy	Maxime-Gaël Ngayap Hambou; France	Murad Fatiyev; Azerbaijan
Middleweight (−90 kg)	Christian Parlati; Italy	Maxime-Gaël Ngayap Hambou; France	Ivaylo Ivanov; Bulgaria
Half-heavyweight (−100 kg)	Ilia Sulamanidze; Georgia	Zelym Kotsoiev; Azerbaijan	Simeon Catharina; Netherlands
Half-heavyweight (−100 kg)	Ilia Sulamanidze; Georgia	Zelym Kotsoiev; Azerbaijan	Gennaro Pirelli; Italy
Heavyweight (+100 kg)	Inal Tasoev; International Judo Federation	Valeriy Endovitskiy; International Judo Federation	Erik Abramov; Germany
Heavyweight (+100 kg)	Inal Tasoev; International Judo Federation	Valeriy Endovitskiy; International Judo Federation	Lukáš Krpálek; Czech Republic

=== Women's events ===
Event	Gold	Silver	Bronze
Extra-lightweight (−48 kg)	Shirine Boukli; France	Catarina Costa; Portugal	Assunta Scutto; Italy
Extra-lightweight (−48 kg)	Shirine Boukli; France	Catarina Costa; Portugal	Andrea Stojadinov; Serbia
Half-lightweight (−52 kg)	Distria Krasniqi; Kosovo	Odette Giuffrida; Italy	Naomi van Krevel; Netherlands
Half-lightweight (−52 kg)	Distria Krasniqi; Kosovo	Odette Giuffrida; Italy	Ariane Toro; Spain
Lightweight (−57 kg)	Seija Ballhaus; Germany	Eteri Liparteliani; Georgia	Veronica Toniolo; Italy
Lightweight (−57 kg)	Seija Ballhaus; Germany	Eteri Liparteliani; Georgia	Martha Fawaz; France
Half-middleweight (−63 kg)	Renata Zachová; Czech Republic	Clarisse Agbegnenou; France	Joanne van Lieshout; Netherlands
Half-middleweight (−63 kg)	Renata Zachová; Czech Republic	Clarisse Agbegnenou; France	Carlotta Avanzato; Italy
Middleweight (−70 kg)	Szofi Özbas; Hungary	Elisavet Teltsidou; Greece	Lara Cvjetko; Croatia
Middleweight (−70 kg)	Szofi Özbas; Hungary	Elisavet Teltsidou; Greece	Aleksandra Andrić; Serbia
Half-heavyweight (−78 kg)	Patrícia Sampaio; Portugal	Anna Monta Olek; Germany	Yuliia Kurchenko; Ukraine
Half-heavyweight (−78 kg)	Patrícia Sampaio; Portugal	Anna Monta Olek; Germany	Fanny Estelle Posvite; France
Heavyweight (+78 kg)	Romane Dicko; France	Raz Hershko; Israel	Asya Tavano; Italy
Heavyweight (+78 kg)	Romane Dicko; France	Raz Hershko; Israel	Elis Startseva; International Judo Federation

=== Mixed events ===
Event	Gold	Silver	Bronze
Mixed team	Georgia; Eter Askilashvili; Mikheili Bakhbakhashvili; Irakli Demetrashvili; Giorgi Jabniashvili; Eteri Liparteliani; Nino Loladze; Luka Maisuradze; Lasha Shavdatuashvili; Sophio Somkhishvili; Mariam Tchanturia; Guram Tushishvili	Italy; Kenny Komi Bedel; Giovanni Esposito; Odette Giuffrida; Manuel Lombardo; Christian Parlati; Irene Pedrotti; Gennaro Pirelli; Erica Simonetti; Giorgia Stangherlin; Asya Tavano; Veronica Toniolo	Germany; Erik Abramov; Seija Ballhaus; Samira Bouizgarne; Timo Cavelius; Fabian Kansy; Losseni Kone; Anna Monta Olek; Dena Pohl; Jano Rübo; Pauline Starke; Friederike Stolze; Igor Wandtke
Mixed team	Georgia; Eter Askilashvili; Mikheili Bakhbakhashvili; Irakli Demetrashvili; Giorgi Jabniashvili; Eteri Liparteliani; Nino Loladze; Luka Maisuradze; Lasha Shavdatuashvili; Sophio Somkhishvili; Mariam Tchanturia; Guram Tushishvili	Italy; Kenny Komi Bedel; Giovanni Esposito; Odette Giuffrida; Manuel Lombardo; Christian Parlati; Irene Pedrotti; Gennaro Pirelli; Erica Simonetti; Giorgia Stangherlin; Asya Tavano; Veronica Toniolo	IJF; Daria Antonova; Timur Arbuzov; Tamerlan Bashaev; Denis Batchaev; Karen Galstian; Mariia Ivanova; Daria Kurbonmamadova; Danil Lavrentev; Tamara Lishchenko; Mansur Lorsanov; Elis Startseva; Irina Zueva

== Participating nations ==
414 judoka from 45 countries:

1. Albania (4)
2. Armenia (3)
3. Austria (16)
4. Azerbaijan (15)
5. Belgium (9)
6. Bosnia and Herzegovina (6)
7. Bulgaria (12)
8. Croatia (12)
9. Cyprus (9)
10. Czech Republic (11)
11. Denmark (2)
12. Spain (12)
13. Estonia (7)
14. Finland (6)
15. France (18)
16. Georgia (15)
17. Germany (18)
18. United Kingdom (8)
19. Greece (7)
20. Hungary (15)
21. Iceland (1)
22. Ireland (2)
23. Israel (15)
24. Italy (18)
25. Kosovo (4)
26. Latvia (3)
27. Liechtenstein (1)
28. Lithuania (5)
29. Luxembourg (1)
30. Moldova (10)
31. Malta (2)
32. Montenegro (9) (Host)
33. Netherlands (15)
34. North Macedonia (2)
35. Norway (1)
36. Poland (14)
37. Portugal (9)
38. Romania (5)
39. Serbia (18)
40. Slovakia (6)
41. Slovenia (5)
42. Switzerland (5)
43. Sweden (3)
44. Turkey (14)
45. Ukraine (13)
46. International Judo Federation (27)
47. IJF Refugee Team (1)
