= Makhmadbek Makhmadbekov =

Russian judoka

Personal information
- Native name: Махмадбек Шоинович Махмадбеков
- Full name: Makhmadbek Shoinovich Makhmadbekov
- Born: 1 October 1999 (age 27) Irkutsk, Russia
- Occupation: Judoka

Sport
- Country: Russia (until May 2024); United Arab Emirates (since August 2024)
- Sport: Judo
- Weight class: ‍–‍73 kg

Achievements and titles
- World Champ.: (silver) (2026)
- Asian Champ.: (silver) (2025, 2026)
- Highest world ranking: 1^{st}
Medal record
Men's judo
Representing United Arab Emirates
World Championships
Silver medal – second place	2026 Baku	‍–‍73 kg
Bronze medal – third place	2025 Budapest	‍–‍73 kg
Asian Championships
Silver medal – second place	2025 Bangkok	‍–‍73 kg
Silver medal – second place	2026 Ordos	‍–‍73 kg
IJF Grand Slam
Gold medal – first place	2024 Abu Dhabi	‍–‍73 kg
Gold medal – first place	2026 Paris	‍–‍73 kg
Bronze medal – third place	2025 Abu Dhabi	‍–‍73 kg
Islamic Solidarity Games
Bronze medal – third place	2025 Riyadh	‍–‍73 kg
IJF Grand Prix
Bronze medal – third place	2026 Qingdao	‍–‍73 kg
Representing Individual Neutral Athletes
IJF Grand Slam
Gold medal – first place	2023 Astana	‍–‍73 kg
Bronze medal – third place	2023 Baku	‍–‍73 kg
Bronze medal – third place	2023 Abu Dhabi	‍–‍73 kg
Bronze medal – third place	2024 Astana	‍–‍73 kg
IJF Grand Prix
Gold medal – first place	2023 Dushanbe	‍–‍73 kg
Bronze medal – third place	2024 Odivelas	‍–‍73 kg
Representing the IJF
IJF Grand Slam
Gold medal – first place	2022 Ulaanbaatar	‍–‍73 kg
Representing Russia
IJF Grand Slam
Gold medal – first place	2021 Kazan	‍–‍73 kg
Gold medal – first place	2021 Baku	‍–‍73 kg
IJF Grand Prix
Bronze medal – third place	2021 Zagreb	‍–‍73 kg
European U23 Championships
Silver medal – second place	2020 Poreč	‍–‍73 kg
European Junior Championships
Bronze medal – third place	2019 Vantaa	‍–‍73 kg

Profile at external databases
- IJF: 22167
- JudoInside.com: 96796
- Updated on 6 October 2026

Makhmadbek Shoinovich Makhmadbekov (born 1 October 1999) is a Russian-born Emirati judoka. He won the gold medal in the 73 kg event at the ‍–‍73 kg at 73 kg event at the 2021 Judo Grand Slam Kazan.
