= Samuel Gaßner =

Austrian judoka (born 2001)

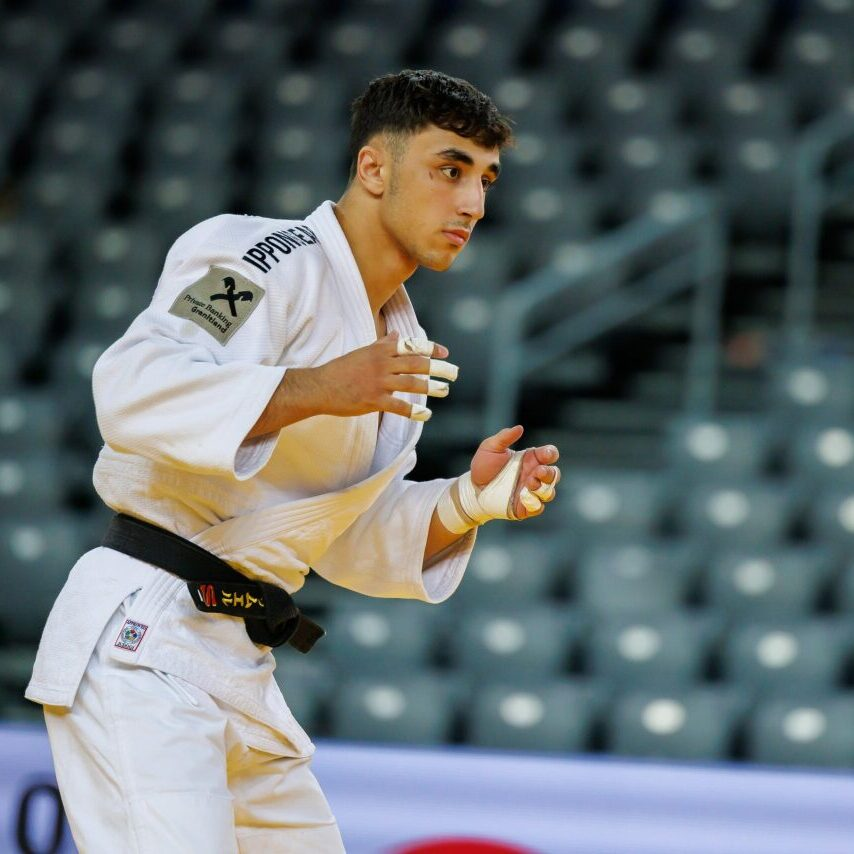

Personal information
- Born: 25 May 2001 (age 25) Linz
- Occupation: Judoka
- Employer: Customs

Sport
- Country: Austria
- Sport: Judo
- Weight class: ‍–‍73 kg
- Rank: 2nd dan black belt
- League: Austrian 1. Bundesliga
- Club: UJZ Mühlviertel
- Coached by: Yvonne Snir-Bönisch

Achievements and titles
- Olympic Games: R16 (2024)
- World Champ.: R32 (2024)
- European Champ.: R32 (2024, 2026)
Medal record
Men's judo
Representing Austria
IJF Grand Slam
Bronze medal – third place	2025 Tbilisi	‍–‍73 kg

Profile at external databases
- IJF: 36428
- JudoInside.com: 97199
- Updated on 18 April 2026

Samuel Gaßner (born 25. May 2001 in Linz) is an Austrian judoka and Austrian judo national champion. He holds the rank of Nidan.

== Judo career ==
In July 2021, he began basic training with the Austrian Armed Forces.

Gaßner won the European Open in Warsaw in February 2024.

=== 2024 Olympic Games ===
In the qualification period for the 2024 Olympic Games had collected 712 points in the IJF Olympic Ranking. He took part in the Games in the -73 kg weight class as well as in the mixed team (together with Katharina Tanzer, Lubjana Piovesana, Michaela Polleres, Wachid Borchashvili and Aaron Fara). In the individual competition, he had to admit defeat after a victory against Hasan Bayan (SYR), Akil Gjakova (KOS). The first encounter in the mixed team competition against Germany ended 4:1. The Austrian team therefore took 9th place.

For his participation in the Olympic Games, he was awarded the Nidan by the Judo Austria.

In September 2024, it was announced that Gaßner was part of the customs sports squad.

== Personal life ==
According to his own statement, Gaßner is the son of an Egyptian father.
