= Rashid Mammadaliyev =

Azerbaijani judoka (born 2000)

- Mammadaliyev in 2021

Personal information
- Native name: Rəşid Elşad oğlu Məmmədəliyev
- Born: 21 April 2000 (age 26)
- Occupation: Judoka

Sport
- Country: Azerbaijan
- Sport: Judo
- Weight class: ‍–‍73 kg

Achievements and titles
- World Champ.: (bronze) (2026)
- European Champ.: (bronze) (2025)
Medal record
Men's judo
Representing Azerbaijan
World Championships
Bronze medal – third place	2026 Baku	‍–‍73 kg
European Championships
Bronze medal – third place	2025 Podgorica	‍–‍73 kg
IJF Grand Slam
Gold medal – first place	2026 Budapest	‍–‍73 kg
Silver medal – second place	2024 Antalya	‍–‍73 kg
Silver medal – second place	2025 Baku	‍–‍73 kg
Bronze medal – third place	2023 Abu Dhabi	‍–‍73 kg
Bronze medal – third place	2025 Paris	‍–‍73 kg
Bronze medal – third place	2026 Dushanbe	‍–‍73 kg
IJF Grand Prix
Silver medal – second place	2023 Linz	‍–‍73 kg
Silver medal – second place	2024 Linz	‍–‍73 kg
Bronze medal – third place	2025 Guadalajara	‍–‍73 kg
European U23 Championships
Gold medal – first place	2019 Izhevsk	‍–‍73 kg
World University Games
Silver medal – second place	2021 Chengdu	‍–‍73 kg
Bronze medal – third place	2021 Chengdu	Men's team

Profile at external databases
- IJF: 30188
- JudoInside.com: 112220
- Updated on 7 October 2026

Rashid Mammadaliyev (Azerbaijani: Rəşid Elşad oğlu Məmmədəliyev, born 21 April 2000) is an Azerbaijani judoka. He is a World Championships and European Championships bronze medalist.

== Career ==
In November 2019, Mammadaliyev competed at the 2019 European U23 Judo Championships and won a gold medal in the ‍–‍73 kg category. He represented Azerbaijan in judo at the 2021 Summer World University Games, which were postponed until 2023, and won a silver medal in the –‍73 kg category and a bronze medal in the men's team event.

In April 2025, he competed at the 2025 European Judo Championships and won a bronze medal in the –73 kg category.

In September 2026, he competed at the 2026 Judo Grand Slam Budapest and won his first career Judo Grand Slam gold medal in the –73 kg category. The next month he competed at the 2026 World Judo Championships and won a bronze medal in the –73 kg category, defeating Daniel Cargnin.
