= Mark Hristov =

Bulgarian judoka (2000)

Personal information
- Born: 4 April 2000 (age 26)
- Occupation: Judoka

Sport
- Country: Bulgaria
- Sport: Judo
- Weight class: ‍–‍73 kg

Achievements and titles
- Olympic Games: R16 (2024)
- World Champ.: R16 (2021, 2023)
- European Champ.: (bronze) (2022)
Medal record
Men's judo
Representing Bulgaria
European Championships
Bronze medal – third place	2022 Sofia	‍–‍73 kg
IJF Grand Slam
Bronze medal – third place	2023 Tel Aviv	‍–‍73 kg
IJF Grand Prix
Bronze medal – third place	2021 Zagreb	‍–‍73 kg
European U23 Championships
Gold medal – first place	2022 Sarajevo	‍–‍73 kg
World Cadets Championships
Silver medal – second place	2017 Santiago	‍–‍66 kg

Profile at external databases
- IJF: 30451
- JudoInside.com: 98290
- Updated on 16 November 2025

Mark Hristov (born 4 April 2000) is a Bulgarian judoka. Hristov won a bronze at the 2022 European Championships in Sofia. He competed in the 2024 Summer Olympics in the men's 73 kg judo category. He won his first match against Aden-Alexandre Houssein of Djibouti before losing his second match to Soichi Hashimoto of Japan.
