= Bilal Çiloğlu =

Turkish judoka (born 1998)

Personal information
- Born: 16 June 1998 (age 28) Sivas, Turkey
- Occupation: Judoka

Sport
- Country: Turkey
- Sport: Judo
- Weight class: ‍–‍73 kg

Achievements and titles
- Olympic Games: R16 (2020)
- World Champ.: (bronze) (2021)
- European Champ.: (bronze) (2018, 2026)
Medal record
Men's judo
Representing Turkey
World Championships
Bronze medal – third place	2021 Budapest	‍–‍73 kg
European Championships
Bronze medal – third place	2018 Tel Aviv	‍–‍73 kg
Bronze medal – third place	2026 Tbilisi	‍–‍73 kg
IJF Grand Slam
Gold medal – first place	2019 Abu Dhabi	‍–‍73 kg
IJF Grand Prix
Gold medal – first place	2018 Agadir	‍–‍73 kg
Gold medal – first place	2019 Perth	‍–‍73 kg
Silver medal – second place	2026 Linz	‍–‍73 kg
Bronze medal – third place	2019 Tashkent	‍–‍73 kg
Mediterranean Games
Bronze medal – third place	2026 Taranto	Mixed team
European U23 Championships
Bronze medal – third place	2017 Podgorica	‍–‍73 kg
World Juniors Championships
Gold medal – first place	2018 Nassau	‍–‍73 kg
Silver medal – second place	2017 Zagreb	‍–‍73 kg
European Junior Championships
Bronze medal – third place	2015 Oberwart	‍–‍66 kg
European Cadet Championships
Gold medal – first place	2015 Sofia	‍–‍66 kg

Profile at external databases
- IJF: 21104
- JudoInside.com: 20616
- Updated on 18 April 2026

Bilal Çiloğlu (born 16 June 1998) is a Turkish judoka. He won a bronze medal in the 2018 European Championships.
