= Igor Wandtke =

German judoka (born 1990)

Personal information
- Born: 3 November 1990 (age 35) Lübeck, Germany
- Occupation: Judoka
- Years active: 2005—present
- Height: 176 cm (5 ft 9 in)

Sport
- Country: Germany
- Sport: Judo
- Weight class: ‍–‍73 kg
- Rank: 4th dan black belt

Achievements and titles
- Olympic Games: R16 (2016, 2024)
- World Champ.: 5th (2024)
- European Champ.: 7th (2012, 2016)
Medal record
Men's judo
Representing Germany
Olympic Games
Bronze medal – third place	2020 Tokyo	Mixed team
World Championships
Bronze medal – third place	2013 Rio de Janeiro	Men's team
Bronze medal – third place	2022 Tashkent	Mixed team
Bronze medal – third place	2025 Budapest	Mixed team
European Championships
Gold medal – first place	2018 Yekaterinburg	Mixed team
Bronze medal – third place	2025 Podgorica	Mixed team
World Masters
Bronze medal – third place	2021 Doha	‍–‍73 kg
IJF Grand Slam
Silver medal – second place	2015 Abu Dhabi	‍–‍73 kg
Silver medal – second place	2023 Tel Aviv	‍–‍73 kg
Bronze medal – third place	2015 Tyumen	‍–‍73 kg
Bronze medal – third place	2015 Paris	‍–‍73 kg
Bronze medal – third place	2019 Abu Dhabi	‍–‍73 kg
IJF Grand Prix
Gold medal – first place	2013 Qingdao	‍–‍73 kg
Silver medal – second place	2018 Tashkent	‍–‍73 kg
Silver medal – second place	2019 Perth	‍–‍73 kg
Bronze medal – third place	2016 Havana	‍–‍73 kg
Bronze medal – third place	2019 Hohhot	‍–‍73 kg
European U23 Championships
Bronze medal – third place	2012 Prague	‍–‍73 kg

Profile at external databases
- IJF: 1239
- JudoInside.com: 37679
- Updated on 21 June 2025

Igor Wandtke (born 3 November 1990) is a German judoka. He competed at the 2016 Summer Olympics in the men's 73 kg event, in which he was eliminated in the third round by Sagi Muki.

In 2021, Wandtke won a bronze medal in the men's ‍–‍73 kg event at the Judo World Masters held in Doha, Qatar.
