= Manuel Lombardo =

Italian judoka (born 1998)

Personal information
- Born: 4 December 1998 (age 27) Turin, Italy
- Occupation: Judoka
- Height: 173 cm (5 ft 8 in)

Sport
- Country: Italy
- Sport: Judo
- Weight class: ‍–‍66 kg, ‍–‍73 kg

Achievements and titles
- Olympic Games: 5th (2020, 2024)
- World Champ.: (silver) (2021, 2023)
- European Champ.: (gold) (2021)
Medal record
Men's judo
Representing Italy
World Championships
Silver medal – second place	2021 Budapest	‍–‍66 kg
Silver medal – second place	2023 Doha	‍–‍73 kg
European Championships
Gold medal – first place	2021 Lisbon	‍–‍66 kg
Silver medal – second place	2025 Podgorica	‍–‍73 kg
Silver medal – second place	2025 Podgorica	Mixed team
European Championships Open
Silver medal – second place	2023 Pristina	‍–‍73 kg
World Masters
Gold medal – first place	2019 Qingdao	‍–‍66 kg
IJF Grand Slam
Gold medal – first place	2019 Abu Dhabi	‍–‍66 kg
Gold medal – first place	2023 Antalya	‍–‍73 kg
Gold medal – first place	2024 Tashkent	‍–‍73 kg
Gold medal – first place	2024 Astana	‍–‍73 kg
Silver medal – second place	2019 Brasilia	‍–‍66 kg
Silver medal – second place	2022 Antalya	‍–‍73 kg
Silver medal – second place	2026 Paris	‍–‍73 kg
Bronze medal – third place	2023 Tokyo	‍–‍73 kg
IJF Grand Prix
Gold medal – first place	2019 Tel Aviv	‍–‍66 kg
Gold medal – first place	2022 Zagreb	‍–‍73 kg
World Juniors Championships
Gold medal – first place	2018 Nassau	‍–‍66 kg
European Junior Championships
Gold medal – first place	2018 Sofia	‍–‍66 kg
Bronze medal – third place	2016 Málaga	‍–‍60 kg
European Cadet Championships
Gold medal – first place	2015 Sofia	‍–‍60 kg
Bronze medal – third place	2014 Athens	‍–‍55 kg
Mediterranean Games
Gold medal – first place	2018 Tarragona	‍–‍66 kg

Profile at external databases
- IJF: 18436
- JudoInside.com: 72766
- Updated on 9 February 2026

Manuel Lombardo (born 4 December 1998) is an Italian judoka. He is a two-time silver medalist at the World Judo Championships. He is also a gold medalist at both the Mediterranean Games and the European Judo Championships. Lombardo represented Italy at the 2020 Summer Olympics in Tokyo, Japan and the 2024 Summer Olympics in Paris, France.

== Career ==
In 2018, Lombardo won the gold medal in the men's 66 kg event at the Mediterranean Games held in Tarragona, Spain.

He won the gold medal in the men's 66 kg event at the 2021 European Judo Championships held in Lisbon, Portugal. He defeated Vazha Margvelashvili of Georgia in his gold medal match.

Lombardo lost his bronze medal match in the men's 66 kg event at the 2020 Summer Olympics in Tokyo, Japan.

Lombardo won the silver medal in the men's 73 kg event at the 2022 Judo Grand Slam Antalya held in Antalya, Turkey. He lost his bronze medal match in the men's 73 kg event at the 2022 Mediterranean Games held in Oran, Algeria.

He won the silver medal in the men's 73 kg event at the 2023 World Judo Championships held in Doha, Qatar. He lost his bronze medal match in the men's 73 kg event at the 2024 Summer Olympics in Paris, France.

== Achievements ==
Year	Tournament	Place	Weight class
2018	Mediterranean Games	1st	−66 kg
2021	European Championships	1st	−66 kg
2021	World Championships	2nd	−66 kg
2023	World Championships	2nd	−73 kg
