= Martin Hojak =

Slovenian judoka (born 1997)

Personal information
- Nationality: Slovenian
- Born: 16 November 1997 (age 28)
- Occupation: Judoka

Sport
- Country: Slovenia
- Sport: Judo
- Weight class: ‍–‍73 kg

Achievements and titles
- World Champ.: R16 (2017)
- European Champ.: 5th (2016)
Medal record
Men's judo
Representing Slovenia
IJF Grand Prix
Gold medal – first place	2022 Perth	‍–‍73 kg
Bronze medal – third place	2019 Perth	‍–‍73 kg
Bronze medal – third place	2020 Tel Aviv	‍–‍73 kg
Bronze medal – third place	2023 Zagreb	‍–‍73 kg
Bronze medal – third place	2025 Guadalajara	‍–‍73 kg
World Juniors Championships
Bronze medal – third place	2015 Abu Dhabi	‍–‍73 kg
European Junior Championships
Silver medal – second place	2015 Oberwart	‍–‍73 kg
Bronze medal – third place	2016 Málaga	‍–‍73 kg
European Cadet Championships
Bronze medal – third place	2014 Athens	‍–‍73 kg
Mediterranean Games
Bronze medal – third place	2026 Taranto	‍–‍73 kg
Bronze medal – third place	2026 Taranto	Mixed team

Profile at external databases
- IJF: 14776
- JudoInside.com: 73716
- Updated on 1 September 2026

Martin Hojak (born 16 November 1997) is a Slovenian judoka.

Hojak is the a medallist of the 2020 Judo Grand Prix Tel Aviv in the ‍–‍73 kg category.

Hojak competed in the men's 73 kg event at the 2022 Mediterranean Games held in Oran, Algeria.
