= Lasha Shavdatuashvili =

Georgian judoka (born 1992)

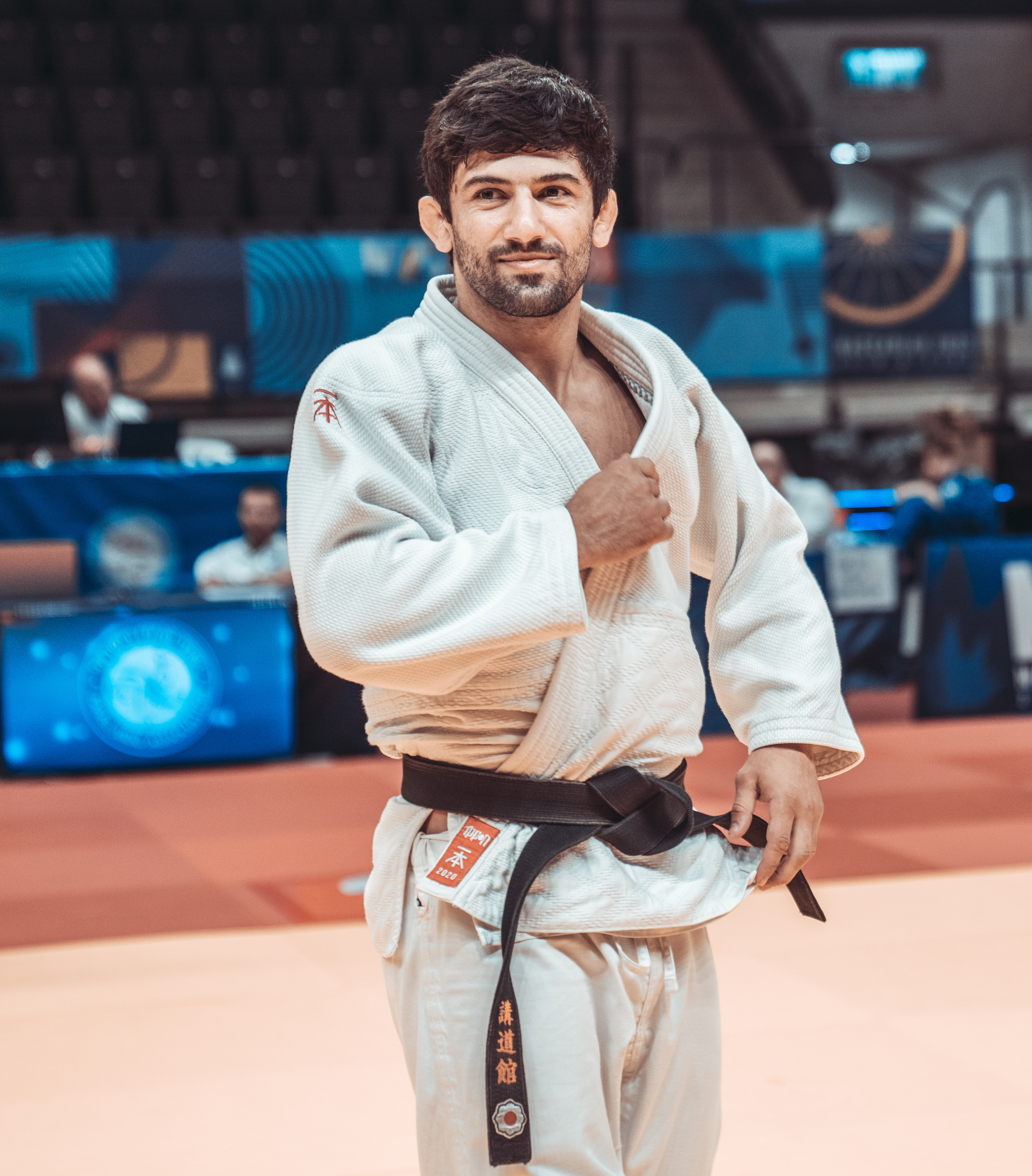
- Shavdatuashvili in 2022

Personal information
- Native name: ლაშა შავდათუაშვილი
- Born: 31 January 1992 (age 34) Gori, Georgia
- Occupation: Judoka
- Height: 172 cm (5 ft 8 in)

Sport
- Country: Georgia
- Sport: Judo
- Weight class: ‍–‍66 kg, ‍–‍73 kg
- Rank: Black belt

Achievements and titles
- Olympic Games: (gold) (2012)
- World Champ.: (gold) (2021)
- European Champ.: (gold) (2013, 2026)
Medal record
Men's judo
Representing Georgia
Olympic Games
Gold medal – first place	2012 London	‍–‍66 kg
Silver medal – second place	2020 Tokyo	‍–‍73 kg
Bronze medal – third place	2016 Rio de Janeiro	‍–‍73 kg
World Championships
Gold medal – first place	2013 Rio de Janeiro	Men's team
Gold medal – first place	2021 Budapest	‍–‍73 kg
Bronze medal – third place	2014 Chelyabinsk	Men's team
Bronze medal – third place	2015 Astana	Men's team
Bronze medal – third place	2023 Doha	Mixed team
Bronze medal – third place	2026 Baku	Mixed team
European Games
Gold medal – first place	2023 Kraków	Mixed team
Silver medal – second place	2015 Baku	Men's team
European Championships
Gold medal – first place	2012 Chelyabinsk	Men's team
Gold medal – first place	2013 Budapest	‍–‍66 kg
Gold medal – first place	2013 Budapest	Men's team
Gold medal – first place	2016 Kazan	Men's team
Gold medal – first place	2017 Warsaw	Men's team
Gold medal – first place	2025 Podgorica	Mixed team
Gold medal – first place	2026 Tbilisi	‍–‍73 kg
Silver medal – second place	2016 Kazan	‍–‍73 kg
Silver medal – second place	2020 Prague	‍–‍73 kg
Silver medal – second place	2024 Zagreb	Mixed team
Bronze medal – third place	2012 Chelyabinsk	‍–‍66 kg
Bronze medal – third place	2024 Zagreb	‍–‍73 kg
World Masters
Silver medal – second place	2017 Saint Petersburg	‍–‍73 kg
Bronze medal – third place	2018 Guangzhou	‍–‍73 kg
Bronze medal – third place	2023 Budapest	‍–‍73 kg
IJF Grand Slam
Gold medal – first place	2018 Abu Dhabi	‍–‍73 kg
Gold medal – first place	2022 Paris	‍–‍73 kg
Gold medal – first place	2022 Tbilisi	‍–‍73 kg
Gold medal – first place	2023 Paris	‍–‍73 kg
Gold medal – first place	2024 Tbilisi	‍–‍73 kg
Gold medal – first place	2025 Tbilisi	‍–‍73 kg
Silver medal – second place	2018 Paris	‍–‍73 kg
Silver medal – second place	2022 Budapest	‍–‍73 kg
Bronze medal – third place	2012 Rio de Janeiro	‍–‍66 kg
Bronze medal – third place	2015 Abu Dhabi	‍–‍73 kg
Bronze medal – third place	2019 Paris	‍–‍73 kg
Bronze medal – third place	2019 Düsseldorf	‍–‍73 kg
Bronze medal – third place	2021 Tbilisi	‍–‍73 kg
Bronze medal – third place	2021 Abu Dhabi	‍–‍73 kg
Bronze medal – third place	2022 Baku	‍–‍73 kg
Bronze medal – third place	2023 Tbilisi	‍–‍73 kg
IJF Grand Prix
Gold medal – first place	2015 Zagreb	‍–‍73 kg
Gold medal – first place	2016 Almaty	‍–‍73 kg
Gold medal – first place	2018 Tbilisi	‍–‍73 kg
Silver medal – second place	2014 Tbilisi	‍–‍73 kg
Silver medal – second place	2014 Budapest	‍–‍73 kg
Silver medal – second place	2017 Düsseldorf	‍–‍73 kg
Silver medal – second place	2019 Marrakesh	‍–‍73 kg
Bronze medal – third place	2015 Tbilisi	‍–‍73 kg
Bronze medal – third place	2016 Düsseldorf	‍–‍73 kg
Bronze medal – third place	2016 Tbilisi	‍–‍73 kg
Bronze medal – third place	2018 The Hague	‍–‍73 kg
World Juniors Championships
Bronze medal – third place	2011 Cape Town	‍–‍66 kg
European Junior Championships
Gold medal – first place	2011 Lommel	‍–‍66 kg

Profile at external databases
- IJF: 3726
- JudoInside.com: 73436
- Updated on 18 April 2026

Lasha Shavdatuashvili (Georgian: ლაშა შავდათუაშვილი; born 31 January 1992) is a Georgian judoka. Shavdatuashvili is one of the most successful judoka of the early 21st century, having won Olympic medals at the 2012, 2016 and 2020 Summer Olympics as well as a dozen medals on the IJF World Tour.

== Judo career ==
Shavdatuashvili won the gold medal in the 66 kg event at the 2012 Summer Olympics. In 2013, he won the European title in the same division. In 2014, he moved up to the -73 kg weight division. Initially, he was not as successful as at -66 kg, but developed over time.

Shavdatuashvili defeated Israeli judoka Sagi Muki during Rio 2016 Olympics and won bronze medal. He also won European silver that year.

Shavdatuashvili again medaled at the delayed 2020 Summer Olympics, this time with a silver medal. He lost in the final contest to back-to-back gold medalist Shohei Ono via wazari.

He won the Male Athlete of the Year award at the 2021 Judo Awards, having also won the World Title that year.

He was part of the Georgian team that won the mixed team event at the 2023 European Games.

He also competed in the men's -73 kg category at the 2024 Summer Olympics. That year he also won the bronze medal at the European Championships.
