= Giovanni Esposito (judoka) =

Italian judoka (born 1998)

Personal information
- Born: 9 February 1998 (age 28)
- Occupation: Judoka

Sport
- Country: Italy
- Sport: Judo
- Weight class: ‍–‍73 kg

Achievements and titles
- World Champ.: 7th (2026)
- European Champ.: (silver) (2022)
Medal record
Men's judo
Representing Italy
World Championships
Bronze medal – third place	2024 Abu Dhabi	Mixed team
European Championships
Silver medal – second place	2022 Sofia	‍–‍73 kg
Silver medal – second place	2025 Podgorica	Mixed team
IJF Grand Slam
Silver medal – second place	2021 Tel Aviv	‍–‍73 kg
Silver medal – second place	2022 Abu Dhabi	‍–‍73 kg
IJF Grand Prix
Gold medal – first place	2025 Linz	‍–‍73 kg
Gold medal – first place	2025 Zagreb	‍–‍73 kg
Silver medal – second place	2019 Tel Aviv	‍–‍73 kg
Silver medal – second place	2024 Zagreb	‍–‍73 kg
Bronze medal – third place	2026 Lima	‍–‍73 kg
European Junior Championships
Bronze medal – third place	2018 Sofia	‍–‍73 kg
World Cadets Championships
Gold medal – first place	2015 Sarajevo	‍–‍66 kg
European Cadet Championships
Bronze medal – third place	2015 Sofia	‍–‍66 kg

Profile at external databases
- IJF: 18842
- JudoInside.com: 72782
- Updated on 6 October 2026

Giovanni Esposito (born 9 February 1998) is an Italian judoka.

Esposito won the silver medal in the ‍–‍73 kg event at the 2021 Judo Grand Slam Tel Aviv.
