= Akil Gjakova =

Kosovar judoka (born 1996)

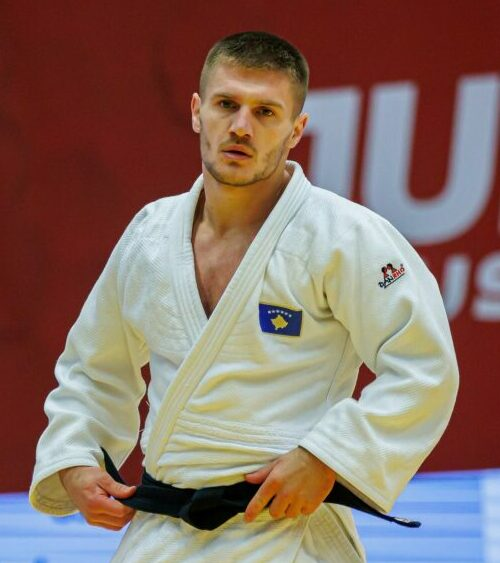
- Gjakova competing in the Austrian Ersten Judo-Bundesliga 2021

Personal information
- Nationality: Kosovan
- Born: 4 January 1996 (age 30) Peja, FR Yugoslavia (now Kosovo)
- Occupation: Judoka
- Height: 174 cm (5 ft 9 in)
- Weight: 73 kg (161 lb)

Sport
- Country: Kosovo
- Sport: Judo
- Weight class: ‍–‍73 kg
- Rank: 1st dan black belt

Achievements and titles
- Olympic Games: 5th (2024)
- World Champ.: R16 (2018, 2023, 2025)
- European Champ.: (gold) (2021)
Medal record
Men's judo
Representing Kosovo
European Championships
Gold medal – first place	2021 Lisbon	‍–‍73 kg
Bronze medal – third place	2023 Montpellier	‍–‍73 kg
European Championships Open
Gold medal – first place	2023 Pristina	‍–‍73 kg
IJF Grand Slam
Gold medal – first place	2018 Paris	‍–‍73 kg
Silver medal – second place	2018 Abu Dhabi	‍–‍73 kg
Silver medal – second place	2023 Abu Dhabi	‍–‍73 kg
Silver medal – second place	2025 Paris	‍–‍73 kg
Bronze medal – third place	2024 Paris	‍–‍73 kg
IJF Grand Prix
Gold medal – first place	2018 Zagreb	‍–‍73 kg
Gold medal – first place	2019 Budapest	‍–‍73 kg
Silver medal – second place	2018 Tunis	‍–‍73 kg
Silver medal – second place	2018 The Hague	‍–‍73 kg
Bronze medal – third place	2026 Zagreb	‍–‍73 kg
European U23 Championships
Gold medal – first place	2018 Győr	‍–‍73 kg
Silver medal – second place	2017 Podgorica	‍–‍73 kg
Bronze medal – third place	2016 Tel Aviv	‍–‍73 kg
European Cadet Championships
Gold medal – first place	2013 Tallinn	‍–‍66 kg
Mediterranean Games
Gold medal – first place	2018 Tarragona	‍–‍73 kg
Bronze medal – third place	2022 Oran	‍–‍73 kg
Bronze medal – third place	2026 Taranto	‍–‍73 kg

Profile at external databases
- IJF: 7826
- JudoInside.com: 89913
- Updated on 15 November 2026

Akil Gjakova (born 4 January 1996) is a Kosovar judoka. He has won gold medals at the 2018 Mediterranean Games and the 2021 European Judo Championships.

== Career ==
He won the gold medal in the men's 73 kg event at the 2018 Mediterranean Games held in Tarragona, Spain.

In 2021, he won the gold medal in the men's 73 kg event at the European Judo Championships held in Lisbon, Portugal.

He represented Kosovo at the 2015 European Games in Baku, Azerbaijan and the 2019 European Games in Minsk, Belarus.

== Personal life ==
His sister Nora Gjakova is also a judoka and the 2020 Olympics gold medalist in the women's 57 kg judo event

== Achievements ==
Year	Tournament	Place	Weight class
2017	Jeux de la Francophonie	1st	−73 kg
2018	Mediterranean Games	1st	−73 kg
2021	European Championships	1st	−73 kg
2023	European Championships Open	1st	−73 kg
