= 2019 World Judo Championships – Men's 73 kg =

Judo competition

Judo Men's 73 kg at the 2019 World Judo Championships
- Venue: Nippon Budokan
- Location: Tokyo, Japan
- Date: 27 August
- Competitors: 90 from 72 nations
- Total prize money: 57,000$

Medalists
gold medal	Shohei Ono (3rd title)	Japan
silver medal	Rustam Orujov	Azerbaijan
bronze medal	Hidayat Heydarov	Azerbaijan
bronze medal	Denis Yartsev	Russia

Competition at external databases
- Links: IJF • JudoInside

The Men's 73 kg competition at the 2019 World Judo Championships was held on 27 August 2019.

== Results ==
=== Finals ===
Semi-finals
(Azerbaijan) Rustam Orujov	01
(Azerbaijan) Hidayat Heydarov	00
(Japan) Shohei Ono	10
(Russia) Denis Yartsev	00

Final
(Azerbaijan) Rustam Orujov	00
(Japan) Shohei Ono	10

=== Repechage ===
Repechage
(Israel) Tohar Butbul	00
(Tajikistan) Behruzi Khojazoda	10

Third place
(Tajikistan) Behruzi Khojazoda	00
(Russia) Denis Yartsev	01

Repechage
(Turkey) Bilal Çiloğlu	00
(Tajikistan) Somon Makhmadbekov	10

Third place
(Tajikistan) Somon Makhmadbekov	00
(Azerbaijan) Hidayat Heydarov	01

=== Pool A ===
Preliminary round

	Score	
Vadzim Shoka (Belarus)	01–00	(Portugal) Nuno Saraiva
William Tai Tin (Samoa)	00–10	(Canada) Constantin Gabun
Wiktor Mrówczyński (Poland)	10–00	(Angola) Acácio Quifucussa
Fethi Nourine (Algeria)	10–00	(Haiti) Philippe Metellus
Lukas Reiter (Austria)	10–00	(Belgium) Dirk Van Tichelt
Aden-Alexandre Houssein (Djibouti)	10–00	(Kuwait) Husain Salim

First round
(Azerbaijan) Rustam Orujov	01
(Belarus) Vadzim Shoka	00
(Greece) Georgios Markarian	10
(The Gambia) Faye Njie	00
(Hong Kong) Lee Kwok Wing	00
(Poland) Wiktor Mrówczyński	10
(Israel) Tohar Butbul	01
(Kazakhstan) Zhansay Smagulov	00
(Austria) Lukas Reiter	10
Fares Badawi	00
(Djibouti) Aden-Alexandre Houssein	00
(Italy) Fabio Basile	10

Second round
(Azerbaijan) Rustam Orujov	11
(Greece) Georgios Markarian	00
(Canada) Constantin Gabun	10
(Poland) Wiktor Mrówczyński	00
(Israel) Tohar Butbul	10
(Algeria) Fethi Nourine	00
(Austria) Lukas Reiter	00
(Italy) Fabio Basile	01

Third round
(Azerbaijan) Rustam Orujov	10
(Canada) Constantin Gabun	01
(Israel) Tohar Butbul	10
(Italy) Fabio Basile	00

Quarterfinals
(Azerbaijan) Rustam Orujov	01
(Israel) Tohar Butbul	00

=== Pool B ===
Preliminary round

	Score	
Nguyễn Tấn Công (Vietnam)	00–10	(Hungary) Frigyes Szabó
Thato Lebang (Botswana)	00–11	(Romania) Alexandru Raicu
Mominjan Arzikulov (Turkmenistan)	00–10	(Ukraine) Artem Khomula
Andrew Thomas Mlugu (Tanzania)	00–10	(Germany) Igor Wandtke
Tsendochir Tsogtbaatar (Mongolia)	00–10	(Tajikistan) Behruzi Khojazoda
Cédric Bessi (Monaco)	00–10	(Mexico) Gilberto Cardoso
Ferdinand Karapetian (Armenia)	00–11	(China) Sai Yinjirigala

First round
(Azerbaijan) Hidayat Heydarov	10
(Hungary) Frigyes Szabó	00
(Sri Lanka) Chamara Repiyallage	00
(Russia) Musa Mogushkov	10
(United States) Alexander Turner	00
(Romania) Alexandru Raicu	10
(Ukraine) Artem Khomula	00
(United Kingdom) Eric Ham	10
(Kosovo) Akil Gjakova	11
(Germany) Igor Wandtke	00
(Tajikistan) Behruzi Khojazoda	10
(Cuba) Magdiel Estrada	00
(Peru) Alonso Wong	00
(Mexico) Gilberto Cardoso	10
(Saudi Arabia) Sulaiman Hamad	00
(China) Sai Yinjirigala	10

Second round
(Azerbaijan) Hidayat Heydarov	01
(Russia) Musa Mogushkov	00
(Romania) Alexandru Raicu	00
(United Kingdom) Eric Ham	10
(Kosovo) Akil Gjakova	00
(Tajikistan) Behruzi Khojazoda	10
(Mexico) Gilberto Cardoso	00
(China) Sai Yinjirigala	10

Third round
(Azerbaijan) Hidayat Heydarov	10
(United Kingdom) Eric Ham	00
(Tajikistan) Behruzi Khojazoda	01
(China) Sai Yinjirigala	00

Quarterfinals
(Azerbaijan) Hidayat Heydarov	01
(Tajikistan) Behruzi Khojazoda	00

=== Pool C ===
Preliminary round

	Score	
Tidiane Diop (Senegal)	00–10	(Australia) Calvin Knoester
Eduardo Araújo (Mexico)	00–10	(Hungary) Miklós Ungvári
Younis Eyal Slman (Jordan)	01–00	(Syria) Abd Haj Kadour
Keisei Nakano (Philippines)	10–00	(Paraguay) Luis Villamayor
Mohamed Mohyeldin (Egypt)	01–00	(Portugal) Jorge Fernandes
Bilal Çiloğlu (Turkey)	11–00	(Slovenia) Martin Hojak

First round
(Georgia (country)) Lasha Shavdatuashvili	11
(Australia) Calvin Knoester	00
(United Arab Emirates) Victor Scvortov	10
(United States) Nicholas Delpopolo	00
(Hungary) Miklós Ungvári	00
(Japan) Shohei Ono	10
Ahmad Alikaj	00
(Jordan) Younis Eyal Slman	10
(Mongolia) Ganbaataryn Odbayar	10
(Philippines) Keisei Nakano	00
(Egypt) Mohamed Mohyeldin	11
(Uzbekistan) Khikmatillokh Turaev	00
(Greece) Georgios Azoidis	01
(Italy) Giovanni Esposito	11
(Turkey) Bilal Çiloğlu	10
(Cyprus) Christos Trikomitis	00

Second round
(Georgia (country)) Lasha Shavdatuashvili	11
(United Arab Emirates) Victor Scvortov	00
(Japan) Shohei Ono	11
(Jordan) Younis Eyal Slman	00
(Mongolia) Ganbaataryn Odbayar	10
(Egypt) Mohamed Mohyeldin	00
(Italy) Giovanni Esposito	00
(Turkey) Bilal Çiloğlu	10

Third round
(Georgia (country)) Lasha Shavdatuashvili	00
(Japan) Shohei Ono	10
(Mongolia) Ganbaataryn Odbayar	00
(Turkey) Bilal Çiloğlu	10

Quarterfinals
(Japan) Shohei Ono	10
(Turkey) Bilal Çiloğlu	00

=== Pool D ===
Preliminary round

	Score	
Somon Makhmadbekov (Tajikistan)	10–00	(Cape Verde) Magner Mendes
Anthony Zingg (Germany)	00–10	(Switzerland) Nils Stump
Ishen Amanov (Kyrgyzstan)	00–01	(Luxembourg) Claudio Nunes
Jakub Ječmínek (Czech Republic)	10–00	(Yemen) Ahmed Ayash
Ayton Siquir (Mozambique)	00–10	(China) Qing Daga
Abdulelah Al-Bali (Saudi Arabia)	10–00	(Bhutan) Tandin Wangchuk
Oscar Pertelson (Estonia)	00–10	(France) Guillaume Chaine

First round
(Sweden) Tommy Macias	00
(Tajikistan) Somon Makhmadbekov	10
(Switzerland) Nils Stump	00
(Moldova) Victor Sterpu	10
(Ghana) Emmanuel Nartey	00
(Luxembourg) Claudio Nunes	01
(Costa Rica) Julián Sancho	00
(Czech Republic) Jakub Ječmínek	10
(Canada) Arthur Margelidon	01
(China) Qing Daga	00
(Russia) Denis Yartsev	10
(Saudi Arabia) Abdulelah Al-Bali	00
(Morocco) Ahmed El Meziati	00
(France) Guillaume Chaine	10

Second round
(Tajikistan) Somon Makhmadbekov	10
(Moldova) Victor Sterpu	00
(Luxembourg) Claudio Nunes	01
(Czech Republic) Jakub Ječmínek	00
(Canada) Arthur Margelidon	00
(Russia) Denis Yartsev	10
(France) Guillaume Chaine	10
(Burkina Faso) Lucas Diallo	00

Third round
(Tajikistan) Somon Makhmadbekov	10
(Luxembourg) Claudio Nunes	00
(Russia) Denis Yartsev	10
(France) Guillaume Chaine	00

Quarterfinals
(Tajikistan) Somon Makhmadbekov	00
(Russia) Denis Yartsev	01

== Prize money ==
The sums listed bring the total prizes awarded to 57,000$ for the individual event.

Medal	Total	Judoka	Coach
Gold	26,000$	20,800$	5,200$
Silver	15,000$	12,000$	3,000$
Bronze	8,000$	6,400$	1,600$
