= Judo at the 2019 European Games – Men's 73 kg =

Judo competition

Judo Men's 73 kg at the 2019 European Games
- Venue: Čyžoŭka-Arena
- Location: Minsk, Belarus
- Date: 23 June
- Competitors: 41 from 32 nations

Medalists
gold medal	Tommy Macias (1st title)	Sweden
silver medal	Rustam Orujov	Azerbaijan
bronze medal	Hidayat Heydarov	Azerbaijan
bronze medal	Georgios Azoidis	Greece

Competition at external databases
- Links: IJF • JudoInside

The men's 73 kg judo event at the 2019 European Games in Minsk was held on 23 June at the Čyžoŭka-Arena.

== Results ==
=== Finals ===
Semifinals
Rustam Orujov (AZE)	10
Georgios Azoidis (GRE)	00
Lasha Shavdatuashvili (GEO)	00
Tommy Macias (SWE)	01

Final
Rustam Orujov (AZE)	01
Tommy Macias (SWE)	11

=== Repechage ===
Repechage
Ferdinand Karapetian (ARM)	00
Hidayat Heydarov (AZE)	10

Third place
Hidayat Heydarov (AZE)	10
Lasha Shavdatuashvili (GEO)	00

Repechage
Denis Yartsev (RUS)	00
Tohar Butbul (ISR)	10

Third place
Tohar Butbul (ISR)	01
Georgios Azoidis (GRE)	10

=== Pool A ===
Round of 64
Fabio Basile (ITA)	10
Lukas Reiter (AUT)	00
Victor Sterpu (MDA)	01
Dmytro Kanivets (UKR)	11

Round of 32
Rustam Orujov (AZE)	10
Cédric Bessi (MON)	00
Murat Bektaş (TUR)	00
Fabio Basile (ITA)	10
Musa Mogushkov (RUS)	01
Dmytro Kanivets (UKR)	00
Ferdinand Karapetian (ARM)	10
Jorge Fernandes (POR)	00

Round of 16
Rustam Orujov (AZE)	10
Fabio Basile (ITA)	01
Musa Mogushkov (RUS)	00
Ferdinand Karapetian (ARM)	10

Quarterfinals
Rustam Orujov (AZE)	01
Ferdinand Karapetian (ARM)	00

=== Pool B ===
Round of 64
Roudolf Kourtides (CYP)	00
Dmitrijs Fedosejenkovs (LAT)	10
Abdul Malik Umayev (BEL)	01
Vadzim Shoka (BLR)	10
Martin Hojak (SLO)	01
Claudio Nunes Dos Santos (LUX)	00

Round of 32
Hidayat Heydarov (AZE)	01
Miklós Ungvári (HUN)	00
Dmitrijs Fedosejenkovs (LAT)	01
Din Yaacov Gemer (ISR)	10
Akil Gjakova (KOS)	10
Vadzim Shoka (BLR)	00
Georgios Azoidis (GRE)	10
Martin Hojak (SLO)	00

Round of 16
Hidayat Heydarov (AZE)	11
Din Yaacov Gemer (ISR)	00
Akil Gjakova (KOS)	00
Georgios Azoidis (GRE)	11

Quarterfinals
Hidayat Heydarov (AZE)	00
Georgios Azoidis (GRE)	10

=== Pool C ===
Round of 64
Giovanni Esposito (ITA)	01
Artem Khomula (UKR)	10
Alexandru Raicu (ROU)	10
Fabian Ramos (AND)	00

Round of 32
Lasha Shavdatuashvili (GEO)	10
Ion Nacu (MDA)	00
Nuno Saraiva (POR)	00
Artem Khomula (UKR)	01
Denis Yartsev (RUS)	10
Guillaume Chaine (FRA)	00
Nikola Gardašević (MNE)	10
Alexandru Raicu (ROU)	00

Round of 16
Lasha Shavdatuashvili (GEO)	10
Artem Khomula (UKR)	00
Denis Yartsev (RUS)	01
Nikola Gardašević (MNE)	00

Quarterfinals
Lasha Shavdatuashvili (GEO)	01
Denis Yartsev (RUS)	00

=== Pool D ===
Round of 64
Oscar Pertelson (EST)	00
Anthony Zingg (GER)	10
Nils Stump (SUI)	00
Jorge Cano García (ESP)	10

Round of 32
Tommy Macias (SWE)	10
Anthony Zingg (GER)	00
Wiktor Mrówczyński (POL)	00
Frigyes Szabó (HUN)	01
Tohar Butbul (ISR)	10
Jorge Cano García (ESP)	00
Bilal Çiloğlu (TUR)	10
Kęstutis Vitkauskas (ROU)	00

Round of 16
Tommy Macias (SWE)	01
Frigyes Szabó (HUN)	00
Tohar Butbul (ISR)	01
Bilal Çiloğlu (TUR)	00

Quarterfinals
Tommy Macias (SWE)	11
Tohar Butbul (ISR)	00
