= 2017 World Judo Championships – Men's 73 kg =

Judo competition

Judo Men's 73 kg at the 2017 World Judo Championships
- Venue: László Papp Budapest Sports Arena
- Location: Budapest, Hungary
- Dates: 30 August
- Competitors: 73 from 59 nations
- Total prize money: 57,000$

Medalists
gold medal	Soichi Hashimoto (1st title)	Japan
silver medal	Rustam Orujov	Azerbaijan
bronze medal	An Chang-rim	South Korea
bronze medal	Ganbaataryn Odbayar	Mongolia

Competition at external databases
- Links: IJF • JudoInside

The Men's 73 kg competition at the 2017 World Judo Championships was held on 30 August 2017.

== Results ==
=== Finals ===
Semi-finals
(Japan) Soichi Hashimoto	10
(Azerbaijan) Hidayat Heydarov	00
(Azerbaijan) Rustam Orujov	10
(South Korea) An Chang-rim	01

Final
(Japan) Soichi Hashimoto	01
(Azerbaijan) Rustam Orujov	00

=== Repechage ===
Repechage
(Georgia (country)) Lasha Shavdatuashvili	01
(Russia) Denis Yartsev	00

Third place
(Georgia (country)) Lasha Shavdatuashvili	01
(South Korea) An Chang-rim	02

Repechage
(China) Sai Yinjirigala	00
(Mongolia) Ganbaataryn Odbayar	10

Third place
(Mongolia) Ganbaataryn Odbayar	01
(Azerbaijan) Hidayat Heydarov	00

=== Pool A ===
First round fights

	Score	
Miklós Ungvári (Hungary)	02–00	(Chile) Tomas Bringas
Benjamin Axus (France)	10–00	(China) Sun Shuai

Second round
(Japan) Soichi Hashimoto	02
(Armenia) Arsen Ghazaryan	01
(Tajikistan) Saidmukhtor Rasulov	00
(Czech Republic) Jakub Ječmínek	01
(Puerto Rico) Jeffrey Ruiz	00
(Hungary) Miklós Ungvári	00
(Mexico) Eduardo Araújo	00
(Kazakhstan) Jansay Smagulov	01
(Brazil) Marcelo Contini	00
(Georgia (country)) Lasha Shavdatuashvili	10
(Mozambique) Ayton Siquir	00
(The Gambia) Faye Njie	12
(Germany) Igor Wandtke	00
(Slovenia) Martin Hojak	00
(France) Benjamin Axus	12
(Sri Lanka) Chamara Repiyallage	00

Third round
(Japan) Soichi Hashimoto	10
(Czech Republic) Jakub Ječmínek	00
(Hungary) Miklós Ungvári	00
(Kazakhstan) Jansay Smagulov	10
(Georgia (country)) Lasha Shavdatuashvili	10
(The Gambia) Faye Njie	00
(Slovenia) Martin Hojak	12
(France) Benjamin Axus	00

Fourth round
(Japan) Soichi Hashimoto	01
(Kazakhstan) Jansay Smagulov	00
(Georgia (country)) Lasha Shavdatuashvili	10
(Slovenia) Martin Hojak	00

Quarterfinals
(Japan) Soichi Hashimoto	10
(Georgia (country)) Lasha Shavdatuashvili	00

=== Pool B ===
First round fights

	Score	
Jorge Fernandes (Portugal)	02–00	(Canada) Bradley Langlois
Bektur Rysmambetov (Kyrgyzstan)	00–01	(Romania) Alexandru Raicu

Second round
(Sweden) Tommy Macias	00
(Russia) Denis Yartsev	10
(United Arab Emirates) Victor Scvortov	00
(United States) Nicholas Delpopolo	01
(Costa Rica) Julián Sancho	01
(Lithuania) Regimantas Rybinas	00
(Angola) Antunes Vunge	00
(Portugal) Jorge Fernandes	01
(Azerbaijan) Hidayat Heydarov	11
(Morocco) Ahmed El Meziati	00
(Romania) Alexandru Raicu	11
(Botswana) Thaoto Lebang	00
(Jordan) Eyal Salman Younis	00
(Ukraine) Dmytro Kanivets	11
(Cuba) Magdiel Estrada	10
(The Bahamas) Andrew Munnings	00

Third round
(Russia) Denis Yartsev	01
(United States) Nicholas Delpopolo	00
(Costa Rica) Julián Sancho	00
(Portugal) Jorge Fernandes	10
(Azerbaijan) Hidayat Heydarov	11
(Romania) Alexandru Raicu	00
(Ukraine) Dmytro Kanivets	00
(Cuba) Magdiel Estrada	01

Fourth round
(Russia) Denis Yartsev	01
(Portugal) Jorge Fernandes	00
(Azerbaijan) Hidayat Heydarov	01
(Cuba) Magdiel Estrada	00

Quarterfinals
(Russia) Denis Yartsev	00
(Azerbaijan) Hidayat Heydarov	11

=== Pool C ===
First round fights

	Score	
Akil Gjakova (Kosovo)	11–00	(Spain) Javier Ramírez
Lukas Reiter (Austria)	10–00	(Turkey) Murat Bektaş
Emmanuel Nartey (Ghana)	00–10	(Armenia) Ferdinand Karapetian

Second round
(Azerbaijan) Rustam Orujov	12
(Kosovo) Akil Gjakova	00
(France) Pierre Duprat	01
(Russia) Musa Mogushkov	00
(Tajikistan) Behruzi Khojazoda	01
(Austria) Lukas Reiter	00
(Netherlands) Sam van 't Westende	00
(Uzbekistan) Giyosjan Boboev	01
(Israel) Tohar Butbul	00
(Armenia) Ferdinand Karapetian	00
(Montenegro) Nikola Gardašević	11
(Qatar) Khalil Rebahi	01
(Czech Republic) Jaromír Ježek	00
(Germany) Anthony Zingg	11
(China) Sai Yinjirigala	01
(Peru) Alonso Wong	00

Third round
(Azerbaijan) Rustam Orujov	01
(France) Pierre Duprat	00
(Tajikistan) Behruzi Khojazoda	02
(Uzbekistan) Giyosjan Boboev	01
(Israel) Tohar Butbul	01
(Montenegro) Nikola Gardašević	00
(Germany) Anthony Zingg	00
(China) Sai Yinjirigala	01

Fourth round
(Azerbaijan) Rustam Orujov	10
(Tajikistan) Behruzi Khojazoda	00
(Israel) Tohar Butbul	00
(China) Sai Yinjirigala	01

Quarterfinals
(Azerbaijan) Rustam Orujov	10
(China) Sai Yinjirigala	00

=== Pool D ===
First round fights

	Score	
Oussamma Djeddi (Algeria)	02–11	(Portugal) Nuno Saraiva
Alexander Turner (United States)	12–00	(Mozambique) Carlitos Junior

Second round
(South Korea) An Chang-rim	10
(Canada) Arthur Margelidon	00
(Iran) Mohammed Barimanlou	10
(Pakistan) Nadeem Akram	00
(Moldova) Norin Tatarescu	01
(Portugal) Nuno Saraiva	12
(Ukraine) Artem Khomula	02
(North Korea) Kim Chol-gwang	01
(Mongolia) Ganbaataryn Odbayar	12
(Saudi Arabia) Mohammed Alharbi	00
(United States) Alexander Turner	02
(Romania) Marcel Cercea	01
(Bosnia and Herzegovina) Nikola Boljanovic	00
(Albania) Jon Vrenozi	00
(Belgium) Dirk van Tichelt	11
(Philippines) Keisei Nakano	01

Third round
(South Korea) An Chang-rim	01
(Iran) Mohammed Barimanlou	00
(Portugal) Nuno Saraiva	00
(Ukraine) Artem Khomula	15
(Mongolia) Ganbaataryn Odbayar	11
(United States) Alexander Turner	00
(Albania) Jon Vrenozi	00
(Belgium) Dirk van Tichelt	10

Fourth round
(South Korea) An Chang-rim	11
(Ukraine) Artem Khomula	00
(Mongolia) Ganbaataryn Odbayar	10
(Belgium) Dirk van Tichelt	00

Quarterfinals
(South Korea) An Chang-rim	10
(Mongolia) Ganbaataryn Odbayar	00

== Prize money ==
The sums listed bring the total prizes awarded to 57,000$ for the individual event.

Medal	Total	Judoka	Coach
Gold	26,000$	20,800$	5,200$
Silver	15,000$	12,000$	3,000$
Bronze	8,000$	6,400$	1,600$
