= 2017 European Judo Championships – Men's 73 kg =

Judo competition

Judo Men's 73 kg at the 2017 European Judo Championships
- Venue: Torwar Hall
- Location: Warsaw, Poland
- Date: 21 April
- Competitors: 43 from 30 nations

Medalists
gold medal	Hidayat Heydarov (1st title)	Azerbaijan
silver medal	Musa Mogushkov	Russia
bronze medal	Rustam Orujov	Azerbaijan
bronze medal	Tommy Macias	Sweden

Competition at external databases
- Links: IJF • JudoInside

The men's 73 kg competition at the 2017 European Judo Championships in Warsaw were held on 20 April at the Torwar Hall.

== Results ==
=== Finals ===
Semi-finals
Musa Mogushkov (RUS)	100
Tohar Butbul (ISR)	000
Miklós Ungvári (HUN)	000
Hidayat Heydarov (AZE)	010

Final
Musa Mogushkov (RUS)	000
Hidayat Heydarov (AZE)	100

=== Repechages ===
Repechage		Bronze medal
Rustam Orujov (AZE)	110
Denis Iartcev (RUS)	000	Rustam Orujov (AZE)	100
		Miklós Ungvári (HUN)	000

Repechage		Bronze medal
Lukas Reiter (AUT)	000
Tommy Macias (SWE)	100	Tommy Macias (SWE)	100
		Tohar Butbul (ISR)	000

=== Pool A ===
First round
Roudolf Kourtides (CYP)	000
Andre Seppa (EST)	100
Leonardo Casaglia (ITA)	000
Nikola Gušić (MNE)	020
Sam van 't Westende (NED)	000
Artem Khomula (UKR)	120

Second round
Rustam Orujov (AZE)	100
Andre Seppa (EST)	000
Filip Mosić (SRB)	000
Ferdinand Karapetian (ARM)	100
Musa Mogushkov (RUS)	010
Nikola Gušić (MNE)	000
Artem Khomula (UKR)	010
Marcel Cercea (ROU)	110

Third round
Rustam Orujov (AZE)	020
Ferdinand Karapetian (ARM)	000
Musa Mogushkov (RUS)	110
Marcel Cercea (ROU)	000

Quarterfinals
Rustam Orujov (AZE)	000
Musa Mogushkov (RUS)	010

=== Pool B ===
First round
Georgios Azoidis (GRE)	000
Murat Bektaş (TUR)	010
Norin Tatarescu (MDA)	000
Christopher Wagner (AUT)	110
Armando Mollosmani (ALB)	000
Luís Carmo (POR)	100

Second round
Denis Iartcev (RUS)	100
Murat Bektaş (TUR)	000
Deividas Tarulis (LTU)	000
Christopher Wagner (AUT)	100
Tohar Butbul (ISR)	110
Luís Carmo (POR)	000
Martin Hojak (SLO)	000
Loïc Korval (FRA)	010

Third round
Denis Iartcev (RUS)	100
Christopher Wagner (AUT)	000
Tohar Butbul (ISR)	100
Loïc Korval (FRA)	000

Quarterfinals
Denis Iartcev (RUS)	000
Tohar Butbul (ISR)	100

=== Pool C ===
First round
Alexandru Raicu (ROU)	000
Serhiy Drebot (UKR)	010
Jorge Fernandes (POR)	010
Arsen Ghazaryan (ARM)	000

Second round
Lasha Shavdatuashvili (GEO)	010
Serhiy Drebot (UKR)	000
Jon Vrenozi (ALB)	000
Lukas Reiter (AUT)	100
Miklós Ungvári (HUN)	000
Anthony Zingg (GER)	000
Dmitrijs Fedosejenkovs (LAT)	100
Jorge Fernandes (POR)	000

Third round
Lasha Shavdatuashvili (GEO)	000
Lukas Reiter (AUT)	010
Miklós Ungvári (HUN)	110
Dmitrijs Fedosejenkovs (LAT)	000

Quarterfinals
Lukas Reiter (AUT)	000
Miklós Ungvári (HUN)	100

=== Pool D ===
First round
Jakub Ječmínek (CZE)	000
Akil Gjakova (KOS)	010
Regimantas Rybinas (LTU)	000
Javier Ramírez (ESP)	010
Cedric Bessi (MON)	000
Guillaume Chaine (FRA)	030

Second round
Tommy Macias (SWE)	110
Andrea Gismondo (ITA)	000
Akil Gjakova (KOS)	010
Cornel Andrieș (MDA)	000
Hidayat Heydarov (AZE)	010
Javier Ramírez (ESP)	000
Guillaume Chaine (FRA)	000
Hasan Vanlıoğlu (TUR)	010

Third round
Tommy Macias (SWE)	010
Akil Gjakova (KOS)	000
Hidayat Heydarov (AZE)	100
Hasan Vanlıoğlu (TUR)	000

Quarterfinals
Tommy Macias (SWE)	000
Hidayat Heydarov (AZE)	110
