= 2018 European Judo Championships – Men's 73 kg =

Judo competition

Judo Men's 73 kg at the 2018 European Judo Championships
- Venue: Expo Tel Aviv
- Location: Tel Aviv, Israel
- Date: 27 April

Medalists
gold medal	Ferdinand Karapetian (1st title)	Armenia
silver medal	Hidayat Heydarov	Azerbaijan
bronze medal	Bilal Çiloğlu	Turkey
bronze medal	Tommy Macias	Sweden

Competition at external databases
- Links: IJF • JudoInside

The men's 73 kg competition at the 2018 European Judo Championships was held on 27 April at the Expo Tel Aviv.

== Results ==
=== Finals ===
Semi-finals
Ferdinand Karapetian (ARM)	11
Tommy Macias (SWE)	01
Vadzim Shoka (BLR)	00
Hidayat Heydarov (AZE)	10

Final
Ferdinand Karapetian (ARM)	10
Hidayat Heydarov (AZE)	00

=== Repechage ===
Repechage
Artem Khomula (UKR)	00
Bilal Çiloğlu (TUR)	10

Third place
Bilal Çiloğlu (TUR)	01
Vadzim Shoka (BLR)	00

Repechage
Arsen Ghazaryan (ARM)	01
Akil Gjakova (KOS)	00

Third place
Arsen Ghazaryan (ARM)	01
Tommy Macias (SWE)	10

=== Pool A ===
First round
Dmitrijs Fedosejenkovs (LAT)	00
Ion Nacu (MDA)	01
Armando Mollosmani (ALB)	00
Oscar Pertelson (EST)	01

Round of 32
Rustam Orujov (AZE)	10
Ion Nacu (MDA)	00
Artem Khomula (UKR)	10
Alexandru Raicu (ROU)	00
Ferdinand Karapetian (ARM)	10
Regimantas Rybinas (LTU)	00
Oscar Pertelson (EST)	10
Jorge Fernandes (POR)	00

Round of 16
Rustam Orujov (AZE)	00
Artem Khomula (UKR)	10
Ferdinand Karapetian (ARM)	10
Oscar Pertelson (EST)	00

Quarterfinals
Artem Khomula (UKR)	00
Ferdinand Karapetian (ARM)	11

=== Pool B ===
First round
Lukas Vennekold (GER)	11
Lucas Otmane (FRA)	00
Nikola Gušić (MNE)	00
Fabio Basile (ITA)	10

Round of 32
Tommy Macias (SWE)	10
Lukas Vennekold (GER)	00
Dirk Van Tichelt (BEL)	01
Rountolf Kourtidis (CYP)	00
Tohar Butbul (ISR)	10
Christopher Wagner (AUT)	00
Bilal Çiloğlu (TUR)	01
Fabio Basile (ITA)	00

Round of 16
Tommy Macias (SWE)	01
Dirk Van Tichelt (BEL)	00
Tohar Butbul (ISR)	00
Bilal Çiloğlu (TUR)	01

Quarterfinals
Tommy Macias (SWE)	10
Bilal Çiloğlu (TUR)	00

=== Pool C ===
First round
Igor Wandtke (GER)	10
Oron Giner (ISR)	00
Vadzim Shoka (BLR)	01
Giovanni Esposito (ITA)	00
Nikola Gardašević (MNE)	00
Iulian Peaticovschi (MDA)	10

Round of 32
Lasha Shavdatuashvili (GEO)	00
Igor Wandtke (GER)	01
Lukas Reiter (AUT)	00
Vadzim Shoka (BLR)	10
Sam van 't Westende (NED)	00
Iulian Peaticovschi (MDA)	10
Martin Hojak (SLO)	00
Arsen Ghazaryan (ARM)	01

Round of 16
Igor Wandtke (GER)	00
Vadzim Shoka (BLR)	11
Iulian Peaticovschi (MDA)	00
Arsen Ghazaryan (ARM)	10

Quarterfinals
Vadzim Shoka (BLR)	01
Arsen Ghazaryan (ARM)	00

=== Pool D ===
First round
Nils Stump (SUI)	01
Jon Vrenozi (ALB)	00
Georgios Azoidis (GRE)	00
Uali Kurzhev (RUS)	01

Round of 32
Hidayat Heydarov (AZE)	01
Dmytro Kanivets (UKR)	00
Nuno Saraiva (POR)	00
Nils Stump (SUI)	10
Akil Gjakova (KOS)	11
Cédric Bessi (MON)	00
Marcel Cercea (ROU)	00
Uali Kurzhev (RUS)	10

Round of 16
Hidayat Heydarov (AZE)	10
Nils Stump (SUI)	00
Akil Gjakova (KOS)	01
Uali Kurzhev (RUS)	00

Quarterfinals
Hidayat Heydarov (AZE)	10
Akil Gjakova (KOS)	00
