= 2020 European Judo Championships – Men's 73 kg =

Judo competition

Judo Men's 73 kg at the 2020 European Judo Championships
- Venue: O2 Arena
- Location: Prague, Czech Republic
- Date: 20 November
- Competitors: 35 from 26 nations

Medalists
gold medal	Victor Sterpu (1st title)	Moldova
silver medal	Lasha Shavdatuashvili	Georgia
bronze medal	Rustam Orujov	Azerbaijan
bronze medal	Tommy Macias	Sweden

Competition at external databases
- Links: IJF • JudoInside

The men's 73 kg competition at the 2020 European Judo Championships was held on 20 November at the O2 Arena.

== Results ==
=== Finals ===
Semifinals
Lasha Shavdatuashvili (GEO)	10
Fabio Basile (ITA)	00
Victor Sterpu (MDA)	10
Nils Stump (SUI)	00

Final
Lasha Shavdatuashvili (GEO)	00
Victor Sterpu (MDA)	10

=== Repechage ===
Repechage
Rustam Orujov (AZE)	10
Tohar Butbul (ISR)	00

Third place
Rustam Orujov (AZE)	10
Nils Stump (SUI)	01

Repechage
Lukas Reiter (AUT)	00
Tommy Macias (SWE)	10

Third place
Tommy Macias (SWE)	10
Fabio Basile (ITA)	00

=== Pool A ===
Round of 64
Hevorh Khachatrian (UKR)	00
Anthony Zingg (GER)	11

Round of 32
Rustam Orujov (AZE)	10
Claudio Nunes Dos Santos (LUX)	00
Alexandru Raicu (ROU)	10
Joshua Green (IRL)	00
Lasha Shavdatuashvili (GEO)	10
Anthony Zingg (GER)	00
João Fernando (POR)	01
Yahor Trukhan (BLR)	00

Round of 16
Rustam Orujov (AZE)	11
Alexandru Raicu (ROU)	00
Lasha Shavdatuashvili (GEO)	01
João Fernando (POR)	00

Quarterfinals
Rustam Orujov (AZE)	01
Lasha Shavdatuashvili (GEO)	10

=== Pool B ===
Round of 64
Mark Hristov (BUL)	00
Salvador Cases (ESP)	10

Round of 32
Tohar Butbul (ISR)	10
Ksawery Morka (POL)	00
Daniel Pochop (CZE)	10
Petru Pelivan (MDA)	01
Fabio Basile (ITA)	01
Salvador Cases (ESP)	00
Georgios Azoidis (GRE)	10
Martin Hojak (SLO)	00

Round of 16
Tohar Butbul (ISR)	10
Daniel Pochop (CZE)	00
Fabio Basile (ITA)	01
Georgios Azoidis (GRE)	00

Quarterfinals
Tohar Butbul (ISR)	00
Fabio Basile (ITA)	01

=== Pool C ===
Round of 64

Round of 32
Bilal Çiloğlu (TUR)	01
Georgios Markarian (GRE)	00
Artem Khomula (UKR)	00
Lukas Reiter (AUT)	01
Igor Wandtke (GER)	10
Frigyes Szabó (HUN)	00
Victor Sterpu (MDA)	01
Jeroen Casse (BEL)	00

Round of 16
Bilal Çiloğlu (TUR)	00
Lukas Reiter (AUT)	01
Igor Wandtke (GER)	00
Victor Sterpu (MDA)	01

Quarterfinals
Lukas Reiter (AUT)	00
Victor Sterpu (MDA)	10

=== Pool D ===
Round of 64
Ferdinand Karapetian (ARM)	00
Giovanni Esposito (ITA)	01

Round of 32
Tommy Macias (SWE)	01
Jakub Ječmínek (CZE)	00
Telman Valiyev (AZE)	00
Vadzim Shoka (BLR)	01
Nils Stump (SUI)	10
Giovanni Esposito (ITA)	00
Adrian Şulcă (ROU)	00
Guillaume Chaine (FRA)	10

Round of 16
Tommy Macias (SWE)	10
Vadzim Shoka (BLR)	00
Nils Stump (SUI)	01
Guillaume Chaine (FRA)	00

Quarterfinals
Tommy Macias (SWE)	01
Nils Stump (SUI)	10
