= Judo at the 2020 Summer Olympics – Men's 73 kg =

Men's 73 kg at the Games of the XXXII Olympiad
- Venue: Nippon Budokan
- Date: 26 July 2021
- Competitors: 36 from 36 nations

Medalists
1st place, gold medalist(s)		Shohei Ono; Japan
2nd place, silver medalist(s)		Lasha Shavdatuashvili; Georgia
3rd place, bronze medalist(s)		An Chang-rim; South Korea
3rd place, bronze medalist(s)		Tsend-Ochiryn Tsogtbaatar; Mongolia

The men's 73 kg competition in judo at the 2020 Summer Olympics in Tokyo was held on 26 July 2021 at the Nippon Budokan.

The medals for the competition were presented by Thomas Bach, IOC President, Olympic Champion, and Fencing 1976, Germany; and the medalists' bouquets were presented by Marius Vizer, IJU President; Austria.

== Results ==
=== Finals ===
Semi-finals
Shohei Ono (JPN)	01
5 Tsend-Ochiryn Tsogtbaatar (MGL)	00
2 Lasha Shavdatuashvili (GEO)	10
3 An Chang-rim (KOR)	00

Gold medal
Shohei Ono (JPN)	01
2 Lasha Shavdatuashvili (GEO)	00

=== Repechage ===
Repechage
1 Rustam Orujov (AZE)	01
Akil Gjakova (KOS)	00

Bronze medal
3 An Chang-rim (KOR)	01
1 Rustam Orujov (AZE)	00

Repechage
7 Arthur Margelidon (CAN)	10
6 Tohar Butbul (ISR)	00

Bronze medal
5 Tsend-Ochiryn Tsogtbaatar (MGL)	10
7 Arthur Margelidon (CAN)	00

=== Pool A ===
Round of 64
Somon Makhmadbekov (TJK)	10
Ahmad Alikaj (EOR)	00

Round of 32
1 Rustam Orujov (AZE)	01
Musa Mogushkov (ROC)	00
Faye Njie (GAM)	00
Somon Makhmadbekov (TJK)	10
8 Bilal Çiloğlu (TUR)	10
Younis Eyal Slman (JOR)	00
Alexandru Raicu (ROU)	00
Shohei Ono (JPN)	10

Round of 16
1 Rustam Orujov (AZE)	01
Somon Makhmadbekov (TJK)	00
8 Bilal Çiloğlu (TUR)	00
Shohei Ono (JPN)	10

Quarter-finals
1 Rustam Orujov (AZE)	00
Shohei Ono (JPN)	10

=== Pool B ===
Round of 64
Akil Gjakova (KOS)	10
Ahmed Ayash (YEM)	00

Round of 32
4 Tommy Macias (SWE)	10
Victor Scvortov (UAE)	01
Akil Gjakova (KOS)	11
Nils Stump (SUI)	00
5 Tsend-Ochiryn Tsogtbaatar (MGL)	10
Mamadou Samba Bah (GUI)	00
Cédric Bessi (MON)	10
Lucas Diallo (BUR)	00

Round of 16
4 Tommy Macias (SWE)	00
Akil Gjakova (KOS)	01
5 Tsend-Ochiryn Tsogtbaatar (MGL)	11
Cédric Bessi (MON)	00

Quarter-finals
Akil Gjakova (KOS)	00
5 Tsend-Ochiryn Tsogtbaatar (MGL)	01

=== Pool C ===
Round of 64
Eduardo Barbosa (BRA)	00
Guillaume Chaine (FRA)	10

Round of 32
2 Lasha Shavdatuashvili (GEO)	01
Guillaume Chaine (FRA)	00
Chamara Dharmawardana (SRI)	00
Aden-Alexandre Houssein (DJI)	10
7 Arthur Margelidon (CAN)	01
Sulaiman Hamad (KSA)	00
Zhansay Smagulov (KAZ)	01
Ferdinand Karapetian (ARM)	00

Round of 16
2 Lasha Shavdatuashvili (GEO)	01
Aden-Alexandre Houssein (DJI)	00
7 Arthur Margelidon (CAN)	10
Zhansay Smagulov (KAZ)	01

Quarter-finals
2 Lasha Shavdatuashvili (GEO)	10
7 Arthur Margelidon (CAN)	00

=== Pool D ===
Round of 64
~~Fethi Nourine (ALG)~~	DNS
~~Mohamed Abdalarasool (SUD)~~	DNS

Round of 32
3 An Chang-rim (KOR)	01
Fabio Basile (ITA)	00
Igor Wandtke (GER)	00
Khikmatillokh Turaev (UZB)	10
6 Tohar Butbul (ISR)	FG
Bye
Magdiel Estrada (CUB)	00
Victor Sterpu (MDA)	10

Round of 16
3 An Chang-rim (KOR)	01
Khikmatillokh Turaev (UZB)	00
6 Tohar Butbul (ISR)	10
Victor Sterpu (MDA)	00

Quarter-finals
3 An Chang-rim (KOR)	01
6 Tohar Butbul (ISR)	00

== Politically motivated withdrawal ==
Selected to compete at the 2020 Summer Games in the -73 kg weight class, Algerian judoka Fethi Nourine and his coach Amar Benikhlef announced his withdrawal following the conclusion of the draw of competitors.

Nourine was quoted as saying his political support for the Palestinian cause made it impossible for him to compete against an Israeli; Tohar Butbul, the #5 seed in the tournament, whom he was drawn to potentially face in the second round (had he won in the first round), was Israeli.

The International Judo Federation (IJF) announced the immediate suspension of Nourine and his coach on 24 July 2021, pending a further investigation, while the Algerian Olympic Committee revoked their accreditation, and sent Nourine and his coach back home to Algeria. The Federation explained:

"According to the IJF rules, in line with the Olympic Charter and especially with rule 50.2 that provides for the protection of the neutrality of sport at the Olympic Games and the neutrality of the Games themselves, which states that 'no kind of demonstration or political, religious or racial propaganda is permitted in any Olympic sites, venues or other areas,' Fethi Nourine and Amar Benikhlef are now suspended and will face a decision by the IJF Disciplinary Commission, as well as disciplinary sanctions by the National Olympic Committee of Algeria back in their country.'"
