= 2021 European Judo Championships – Men's 73 kg =

Judo Men's 73 kg at the 2021 European Judo Championships
- Venue: Altice Arena
- Location: Lisbon, Portugal
- Date: 17 April
- Competitors: 34 from 26 nations

Medalists
gold medal	Akil Gjakova (1st title)	Kosovo
silver medal	Tohar Butbul	Israel
bronze medal	Nils Stump	Switzerland
bronze medal	Musa Mogushkov	Russia

Competition at external databases
- Links: IJF • JudoInside

The men's 73 kg competition at the 2021 European Judo Championships was held on 17 April at the Altice Arena.

== Results ==
=== Finals ===
Semifinals
Tohar Butbul (ISR)	10
Bilal Çiloğlu (TUR)	00
Akil Gjakova (KOS)	10
Nils Stump (SUI)	00

Final
Tohar Butbul (ISR)	00
Akil Gjakova (KOS)	01

=== Repechage ===
Repechage
Giovanni Esposito (ITA)	10
Vadzim Shoka (BLR)	00

Third place
Giovanni Esposito (ITA)	00
Nils Stump (SUI)	10

Repechage
Musa Mogushkov (RUS)	10
Tommy Macias (SWE)	00

Third place
Musa Mogushkov (RUS)	10
Bilal Çiloğlu (TUR)	01

=== Pool A ===
Round of 64

Round of 32
Tohar Butbul (ISR)	10
Alexandru Raicu (ROU)	00
Cédric Bessi (MON)	00
Marko Gušić (MNE)	10
Guillaume Chaine (FRA)	00
Giovanni Esposito (ITA)	01
Lukas Vennekold (GER)	10
Jeroen Casse (BEL)	00

Round of 16
Tohar Butbul (ISR)	01
Marko Gušić (MNE)	00
Giovanni Esposito (ITA)	10
Lukas Vennekold (GER)	00

Quarterfinals
Tohar Butbul (ISR)	11
Giovanni Esposito (ITA)	00

=== Pool B ===
Round of 64
Petru Pelivan (MDA)	10
Wiktor Mrówczyński (POL)	00

Round of 32
Bilal Çiloğlu (TUR)	10
Claudio Nunes Dos Santos (LUX)	00
Miklós Ungvári (HUN)	10
Roope Korhonen (FIN)	00
Lasha Shavdatuashvili (GEO)	11
Petru Pelivan (MDA)	00
Vadzim Shoka (BLR)	10
Lukas Reiter (AUT)	00

Round of 16
Bilal Çiloğlu (TUR)	10
Miklós Ungvári (HUN)	00
Lasha Shavdatuashvili (GEO)	00
Vadzim Shoka (BLR)	10

Quarterfinals
Bilal Çiloğlu (TUR)	10
Vadzim Shoka (BLR)	00

=== Pool C ===
Round of 64
Benjamin Axus (FRA)	00
Adam Stodolski (POL)	10

Round of 32
Akil Gjakova (KOS)	10
Ido Levin (ISR)	00
Salvador Cases (ESP)	00
Anthony Zingg (GER)	10
Musa Mogushkov (RUS)	10
Adam Stodolski (POL)	00
Cornel Andrieş (MDA)	00
Ferdinand Karapetian (ARM)	11

Round of 16
Akil Gjakova (KOS)	10
Anthony Zingg (GER)	00
Musa Mogushkov (RUS)	01
Ferdinand Karapetian (ARM)	00

Quarterfinals
Akil Gjakova (KOS)	10
Musa Mogushkov (RUS)	00

=== Pool D ===
Round of 64

Round of 32
Tommy Macias (SWE)	10
Adrian Şulcă (ROU)	00
João Fernando (POR)	10
Martin Hojak (SLO)	00
Fabio Basile (ITA)	01
Mark Hristov (BUL)	00
Nils Stump (SUI)	10
Bayram Kandemir (TUR)	00

Round of 16
Tommy Macias (SWE)	10
João Fernando (POR)	00
Fabio Basile (ITA)	00
Nils Stump (SUI)	10

Quarterfinals
Tommy Macias (SWE)	00
Nils Stump (SUI)	11
