= 2016 European Judo Championships – Men's 73 kg =

Judo Men's 73 kg at the 2016 European Judo Championships
- Venue: TatNeft Arena
- Location: Kazan, Russia
- Date: 22 April
- Competitors: 44 from 31 nations

Medalists
| gold medal | Rustam Orujov (1st title) | Azerbaijan |
| silver medal | Lasha Shavdatuashvili | Georgia |
| bronze medal | Rok Drakšič | Slovenia |
| bronze medal | Nugzar Tatalashvili | Georgia |

Competition at external databases
- Links: IJF • JudoInside

The men's 73 kg competition at the 2016 European Judo Championships was held on 22 April at the TatNeft Arena in Kazan, Russia.

== Results ==
=== Finals ===
Semi-finals
Rustam Orujov (AZE) | 10
Denis Iartsev (RUS) | 00
Martin Hojak (SLO) | 00
Lasha Shavdatuashvili (GEO) | 01

Final
Rustam Orujov (AZE) | 10
Lasha Shavdatuashvili (GEO) | 01

=== Repechage ===
Repechage
Rok Drakšič (SLO) | 10
Sam van 't Westende (NED) | 00

Third place
Rok Drakšič (SLO) | 10
Martin Hojak (SLO) | 00

Repechage
Igor Wandtke (GER) | 00
Nugzar Tatalashvili (GEO) | 00

Third place
Nugzar Tatalashvili (GEO) | 10
Denis Iartsev (RUS) | 00

=== Pool A ===
First round
Kiyoshi Uematsu (ESP) | 00
Pierre Duprat (FRA) | 01
Nuno Saraiva (POR) | 01
Enrico Parlati (ITA) | 00
Andreas Krassas (CYP) | 11
Arsen Ghazaryan (ARM) | 00

Round of 32
Rustam Orujov (AZE) | 10
Kęstutis Vitkauskas (LTU) | 00
Jakub Ječmínek (CZE) | 10
Pierre Duprat (FRA) | 00
Rok Drakšič (SLO) | 10
Nuno Saraiva (POR) | 00
Andreas Krassas (CYP) | 00
Nikola Gušić (MNE) | 11

Round of 16
Rustam Orujov (AZE) | 10
Jakub Ječmínek (CZE) | 00
Rok Drakšič (SLO) | 10
Nikola Gušić (MNE) | 00

Quarterfinals
Rustam Orujov (AZE) | 00
Rok Drakšič (SLO) | 00

=== Pool B ===
First round
Cédric Bessi (MON) | 00
Daniel Williams (GBR) | 01
Hasan Vanlıoğlu (TUR) | 00
Dirk Van Tichelt (BEL) | 00
Dmitrijs Fedosejenkovs (LTU) | 00
Tohar Butbul (ISR) | 10

Round of 32
Denis Iartsev (RUS) | 10
Daniel Williams (GBR) | 00
Martin Thiblin (NOR) | 00
Dirk Van Tichelt (BEL) | 01
Miklós Ungvári (HUN) | 00
Sam van 't Westende (NED) | 11
Tohar Butbul (ISR) | 10
Serhiy Drebot (UKR) | 00

Round of 16
Denis Iartsev (RUS) | 01
Dirk Van Tichelt (BEL) | 00
Sam van 't Westende (NED) | 10
Tohar Butbul (ISR) | 00

Quarterfinals
Denis Iartsev (RUS) | 10
Sam van 't Westende (NED) | 00

=== Pool C ===
First round
Frigyes Szabó (HUN) | 00
Uali Kurzhev (RUS) | 00
Motiejus Čalka (LTU) | 00
Javier Ramírez (ESP) | 01
Igor Wandtke (GER) | 01
Jaromír Ježek (CZE) | 00

Round of 32
Sagi Muki (ISR) | 11
Eetu Laamanen (FIN) | 00
Uali Kurzhev (RUS) | 00
Martin Hojak (SLO) | 00
Dex Elmont (NED) | 10
Javier Ramírez (ESP) | 00
Damian Szwarnowiecki (POL) | 00
Igor Wandtke (GER) | 00

Round of 16
Sagi Muki (ISR) | 00
Martin Hojak (SLO) | 00
Dex Elmont (NED) | 00
Igor Wandtke (GER) | 00

Quarterfinals
Martin Hojak (SLO) | 01
Igor Wandtke (GER) | 00

=== Pool D ===
First round
Georgios Azoidis (GRE) | 10
Antonio Esposito (ITA) | 00
Vadzim Shoka (BLR) | 00
André Alves (POR) | 01
Gheorghe Blanaru (MDA) | 10
Ljubiša Kovačević (SRB) | 01

Round of 32
Nugzar Tatalashvili (GEO) | 11
Georgios Azoidis (GRE) | 00
Tommy Macias (SWE) | 00
Nikola Gardašević (MNE) | 00
Lasha Shavdatuashvili (GEO) | 11
André Alves (POR) | 00
Gheorghe Blanaru (MDA) | 00
Dmytro Kanivets (UKR) | 11

Round of 16
Nugzar Tatalashvili (GEO) | 01
Nikola Gardašević (MNE) | 00
Lasha Shavdatuashvili (GEO) | 10
Dmytro Kanivets (UKR) | 00

Quarterfinals
Nugzar Tatalashvili (GEO) | 00
Lasha Shavdatuashvili (GEO) | 00
