= Miguel Murillo (judoka) =

Costa Rican judoka

Miguel Murillo (born September 29, 1993) is a Costa Rican judoka. He competed at the 2016 Summer Olympics in the men's 73 kg event, in which he was eliminated in the second round by Japan's Shohei Ono.
