= Hidayat Heydarov =

Azerbaijani judoka (born 1997)

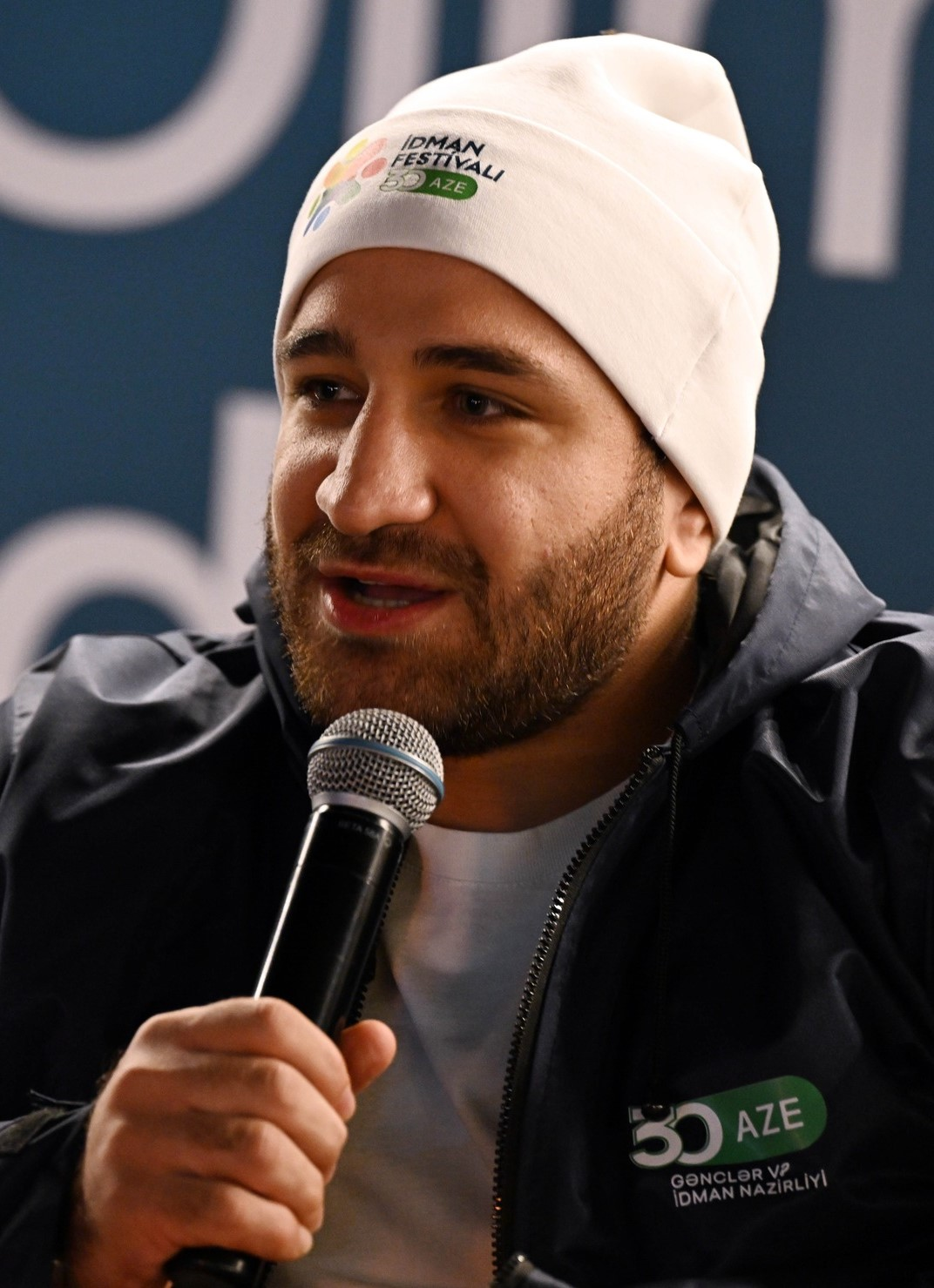
- Heydarov in 2024

Personal information
- Native name: Hidayət Heydərov
- Born: 27 July 1997 (age 29) Alxasava, Goychay District, Azerbaijan
- Occupation: Judoka
- Height: 174 cm (5 ft 9 in)

Signature
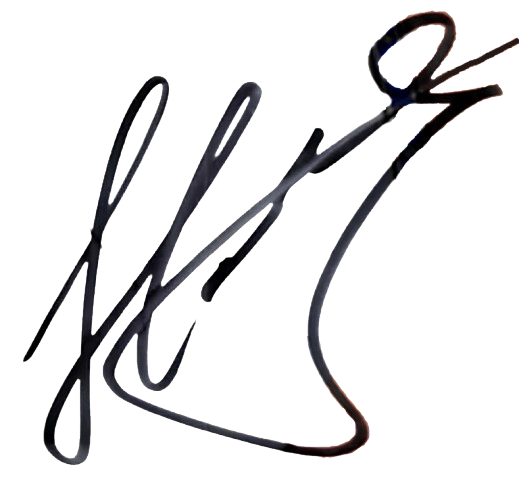

Sport
- Country: Azerbaijan
- Sport: Judo
- Weight class: ‍–‍73 kg

Achievements and titles
- Olympic Games: (gold) (2024)
- World Champ.: (gold) (2024)
- European Champ.: (gold) (2017, 2022, 2023, 2024)
- Highest world ranking: 1^{st}
Medal record
Men's judo
Representing Azerbaijan
Olympic Games
Gold medal – first place	2024 Paris	‍–‍73 kg
World Championships
Gold medal – first place	2024 Abu Dhabi	‍–‍73 kg
Bronze medal – third place	2018 Baku	‍–‍73 kg
Bronze medal – third place	2019 Tokyo	‍–‍73 kg
Bronze medal – third place	2022 Tashkent	‍–‍73 kg
European Games
Bronze medal – third place	2019 Minsk	‍–‍73 kg
European Championships
Gold medal – first place	2017 Warsaw	‍–‍73 kg
Gold medal – first place	2022 Sofia	‍–‍73 kg
Gold medal – first place	2023 Montpellier	‍–‍73 kg
Gold medal – first place	2024 Zagreb	‍–‍73 kg
Silver medal – second place	2018 Tel Aviv	‍–‍73 kg
Silver medal – second place	2026 Tbilisi	‍–‍73 kg
European Championships Open
Bronze medal – third place	2023 Pristina	‍–‍73 kg
World Masters
Bronze medal – third place	2017 Saint Petersburg	‍–‍73 kg
IJF Grand Slam
Gold medal – first place	2019 Baku	‍–‍73 kg
Gold medal – first place	2022 Tel Aviv	‍–‍73 kg
Gold medal – first place	2022 Budapest	‍–‍73 kg
Gold medal – first place	2022 Baku	‍–‍73 kg
Gold medal – first place	2023 Baku	‍–‍73 kg
Gold medal – first place	2023 Tokyo	‍–‍73 kg
Gold medal – first place	2024 Baku	‍–‍73 kg
Bronze medal – third place	2017 Paris	‍–‍73 kg
Bronze medal – third place	2021 Paris	‍–‍73 kg
Bronze medal – third place	2021 Baku	‍–‍73 kg
Bronze medal – third place	2023 Antalya	‍–‍73 kg
Bronze medal – third place	2026 Tbilisi	‍–‍73 kg
Bronze medal – third place	2026 Abu Dhabi	‍–‍73 kg
IJF Grand Prix
Gold medal – first place	2019 Hohhot	‍–‍73 kg
Gold medal – first place	2021 Zagreb	‍–‍73 kg
Gold medal – first place	2025 Guadalajara	‍–‍73 kg
Bronze medal – third place	2017 Antalya	‍–‍73 kg
Bronze medal – third place	2018 Antalya	‍–‍73 kg
Bronze medal – third place	2026 Qingdao	‍–‍81 kg
European U23 Championships
Gold medal – first place	2016 Tel Aviv	‍–‍73 kg
Bronze medal – third place	2015 Bratislava	‍–‍73 kg
World Juniors Championships
Gold medal – first place	2017 Zagreb	‍–‍73 kg
Bronze medal – third place	2015 Abu Dhabi	‍–‍66 kg
European Junior Championships
Gold medal – first place	2016 Málaga	‍–‍73 kg
Gold medal – first place	2017 Maribor	‍–‍73 kg
European Cadet Championships
Gold medal – first place	2013 Tallinn	‍–‍60 kg
Gold medal – first place	2014 Athens	‍–‍66 kg
Summer Universiade
Silver medal – second place	2019 Naples	‍–‍73 kg
Bronze medal – third place	2019 Naples	Men's team
Islamic Solidarity Games
Gold medal – first place	2017 Baku	‍–‍73 kg
Gold medal – first place	2025 Riyadh	‍–‍73 kg
Gold medal – first place	2025 Riyadh	Mixed team

Profile at external databases
- IJF: 13028
- JudoInside.com: 85451
- Updated on 31 October 2026

Hidayat Heydarov (Azerbaijani: Hidayət Heydərov, born 27 July 1997) is an Azerbaijani judoka in the men's 73 kg. He is a four-time European Judo Champion (2017, 2022–24). In 2024, he won the gold medal at the Olympic Games in Paris, the World Championships in Abu Dhabi and the European Championships in Zagreb.

== Biography ==
Heydarov was born on July 27, 1997, in the city of Alxasava, Goychay District, Azerbaijan. When Hidayat was three years old, the family moved to Baku. At the age of six, Heydarov's father enrolled him in the judo section of the Specialized Children and Youth Sports School of Olympic Reserves No. 13, located near the Neftchilar metro station. His first coach was Tarlan Hasanov, who is still his coach as of 2024. One of Heydarov's influences was Elnur Mammadli, the 2008 Olympic judo champion who later became Heydarov's coach. Heydarov also named Irish mixed martial artist Conor McGregor as someone he looked up to.

In 2012, he won a bronze medal at the Azerbaijan Youth Championship. In 2013 and 2014 became the European champion among youths in weight up to 60 and 66 kg, respectively. In 2013 he won the national championship.

In 2014, he entered the Azerbaijan State Academy of Physical Culture and Sports.

In 2015, in Abu Dhabi he became the world champion among juniors, and a year later in Malaga he became the European champion among juniors, and in Orenburg he won the European Cup. In 2017 he took bronze at the Grand Slam tournament in Paris. And in the same year he became the European champion in judo in the weight category up to 73 kg, having beaten Musa Mogushkov from Russia in the final. Thus, Heydarov became the only judoka who won all four European titles, and the European Judo Union named him the best young judoka in Europe.

At the 2017 World Championship, which was his debut, Heydarov reached the semifinals, where he lost to Soichi Hashimoto of Japan. Heydarov also lost the bronze-medal match against Ganbaataryn Odbayar from Mongolia and took 5th place. In October 2017, he became the winner of the World Youth Championship (U-21) in Zagreb, where he defeated Bilal Çiloğlu from Turkey in the final. In December, Heydarov took part in the World Masters tournament in St. Petersburg, where he won a bronze medal, defeating Odbayar Gandbaatar from Mongolia in the decisive fight, to whom he lost a few months earlier at the World Championship. This was the first World Masters medal in the career of a young judoka.

In 2018, Heydarov won a silver medal at the European Championship and a bronze medal at his home world championship. At the 2019 European Games, he took a bronze medal, defeating European champion Ferdinand Karapetyan from Armenia, to whom he lost at last year's European Championship, and 2012 Olympic champion Lasha Shavdatuashvili from Georgia in repechage matches. In addition, Heydarov was also awarded a bronze medal of the European Championship, since this is the status that judo competitions at the European Games in Minsk had. At the 2019 pre-Olympic World Championships, which was held in Tokyo, he won a bronze medal, defeating an opponent from Tajikistan Behruzi Khojazoda in a duel for third place.

He won the gold medal in his event at the 2022 Judo Grand Slam Tel Aviv held in Tel Aviv, Israel.

In March 2026, Heydarov (73 kg) won a bronze medal at the 2026 Tbilisi Grand Slam.

On 30 October 2026, at the 2026 Abu Dhabi Grand Slam, Heydarov sequentially defeated Lucian Borș Dumitrescu (Romania), Abdul Malik Umayev (Belgium), and Akil Gjakova (Kosovo), advancing to the semifinals, where he lost to Tajikistan's representative Masudi Ahmadzoda, but in the third-place match he defeated Georgian athlete Irakli Goginashvili and won the bronze medal.
