= 2017 Judo Grand Slam Abu Dhabi =

Judo competition

Judo 2017 Judo Grand Slam Abu Dhabi
- Venue: Mubadala Arena, Abu Dhabi
- Location: Abu Dhabi, United Arab Emirates
- Dates: 26–28 October 2017
- Competitors: 276 from 47 nations

Competition at external databases
- Links: IJF • EJU • JudoInside

The 2017 Judo Grand Slam was held in Abu Dhabi, United Arab Emirates, from 26 to 26 October 2017.

== Medal summary ==
=== Men's events ===
Event	Gold	Silver	Bronze
Extra-lightweight (−60 kg)	Robert Mshvidobadze (RUS)	Felipe Kitadai (BRA)	Francisco Garrigós (ESP)
Extra-lightweight (−60 kg)	Robert Mshvidobadze (RUS)	Felipe Kitadai (BRA)	Sharafuddin Lutfillaev (UZB)
Half-lightweight (−66 kg)	Tal Flicker (ISR)	Nijat Shikhalizada (AZE)	Vazha Margvelashvili (GEO)
Half-lightweight (−66 kg)	Tal Flicker (ISR)	Nijat Shikhalizada (AZE)	Abdula Abdulzhalilov (RUS)
Lightweight (−73 kg)	Ganbaataryn Odbayar (MGL)	Musa Mogushkov (RUS)	Rustam Orujov (AZE)
Lightweight (−73 kg)	Ganbaataryn Odbayar (MGL)	Musa Mogushkov (RUS)	Tohar Butbul (ISR)
Half-middleweight (−81 kg)	Frank de Wit (NED)	Otgonbaataryn Uuganbaatar (MGL)	Alan Khubetsov (RUS)
Half-middleweight (−81 kg)	Frank de Wit (NED)	Otgonbaataryn Uuganbaatar (MGL)	Saeid Mollaei (IRI)
Middleweight (−90 kg)	Nikoloz Sherazadishvili (ESP)	Beka Gviniashvili (GEO)	Zachary Burt (CAN)
Middleweight (−90 kg)	Nikoloz Sherazadishvili (ESP)	Beka Gviniashvili (GEO)	Mammadali Mehdiyev (AZE)
Half-heavyweight (−100 kg)	Niyaz Bilalov (RUS)	Toma Nikiforov (BEL)	Kirill Denisov (RUS)
Half-heavyweight (−100 kg)	Niyaz Bilalov (RUS)	Toma Nikiforov (BEL)	Peter Paltchik (ISR)
Heavyweight (+100 kg)	Cyrille Maret (FRA)	Maciej Sarnacki (POL)	Anton Krivobokov (RUS)
Heavyweight (+100 kg)	Cyrille Maret (FRA)	Maciej Sarnacki (POL)	Or Sasson (ISR)

=== Women's events ===
Event	Gold	Silver	Bronze
Extra-lightweight (−48 kg)	Irina Dolgova (RUS)	Milica Nikolić (SRB)	Otgontsetseg Galbadrakh (KAZ)
Extra-lightweight (−48 kg)	Irina Dolgova (RUS)	Milica Nikolić (SRB)	Paula Pareto (ARG)
Half-lightweight (−52 kg)	Charline Van Snick (BEL)	Érika Miranda (BRA)	Gili Cohen (ISR)
Half-lightweight (−52 kg)	Charline Van Snick (BEL)	Érika Miranda (BRA)	Alexandra-Larisa Florian (ROU)
Lightweight (−57 kg)	Dorjsürengiin Sumiyaa (MGL)	Rafaela Silva (BRA)	Nekoda Smythe-Davis (GBR)
Lightweight (−57 kg)	Dorjsürengiin Sumiyaa (MGL)	Rafaela Silva (BRA)	Anastasia Konkina (RUS)
Half-middleweight (−63 kg)	Edwige Gwend (ITA)	Lucy Renshall (GBR)	Kathrin Unterwurzacher (AUT)
Half-middleweight (−63 kg)	Edwige Gwend (ITA)	Lucy Renshall (GBR)	Agata Ozdoba-Błach (POL)
Middleweight (−70 kg)	Anna Bernholm (SWE)	Kim Polling (NED)	Maria Portela (BRA)
Middleweight (−70 kg)	Anna Bernholm (SWE)	Kim Polling (NED)	Miriam Butkereit (GER)
Half-heavyweight (−78 kg)	Natalie Powell (GBR)	Marhinde Verkerk (NED)	Mayra Aguiar (BRA)
Half-heavyweight (−78 kg)	Natalie Powell (GBR)	Marhinde Verkerk (NED)	Guusje Steenhuis (NED)
Heavyweight (+78 kg)	Tessie Savelkouls (NED)	Iryna Kindzerska (AZE)	Beatriz Souza (BRA)
Heavyweight (+78 kg)	Tessie Savelkouls (NED)	Iryna Kindzerska (AZE)	Maria Suelen Altheman (BRA)

Source Results

=== Medal table ===
* Host nation (United Arab Emirates)

Rank	Nation	Gold	Silver	Bronze	Total
1	Russia (RUS)	3	1	5	9
2	Netherlands (NED)	2	2	1	5
3	Mongolia (MGL)	2	1	0	3
4	Great Britain (GBR)	1	1	1	3
5	Belgium (BEL)	1	1	0	2
6	Israel (ISR)	1	0	4	5
7	Spain (ESP)	1	0	1	2
8	France (FRA)	1	0	0	1
8	Italy (ITA)	1	0	0	1
8	Sweden (SWE)	1	0	0	1
11	Brazil (BRA)	0	3	4	7
12	Azerbaijan (AZE)	0	2	2	4
13	Georgia (GEO)	0	1	1	2
13	Poland (POL)	0	1	1	2
15	Serbia (SRB)	0	1	0	1
16	Argentina (ARG)	0	0	1	1
16	Austria (AUT)	0	0	1	1
16	Canada (CAN)	0	0	1	1
16	Germany (GER)	0	0	1	1
16	Iran (IRI)	0	0	1	1
16	Kazakhstan (KAZ)	0	0	1	1
16	Romania (ROU)	0	0	1	1
16	Uzbekistan (UZB)	0	0	1	1
Totals (23 entries)		14	14	28	56
