= Judo at the 2016 Summer Olympics – Men's 73 kg =

Men's 73 kg at the Games of the XXXI Olympiad
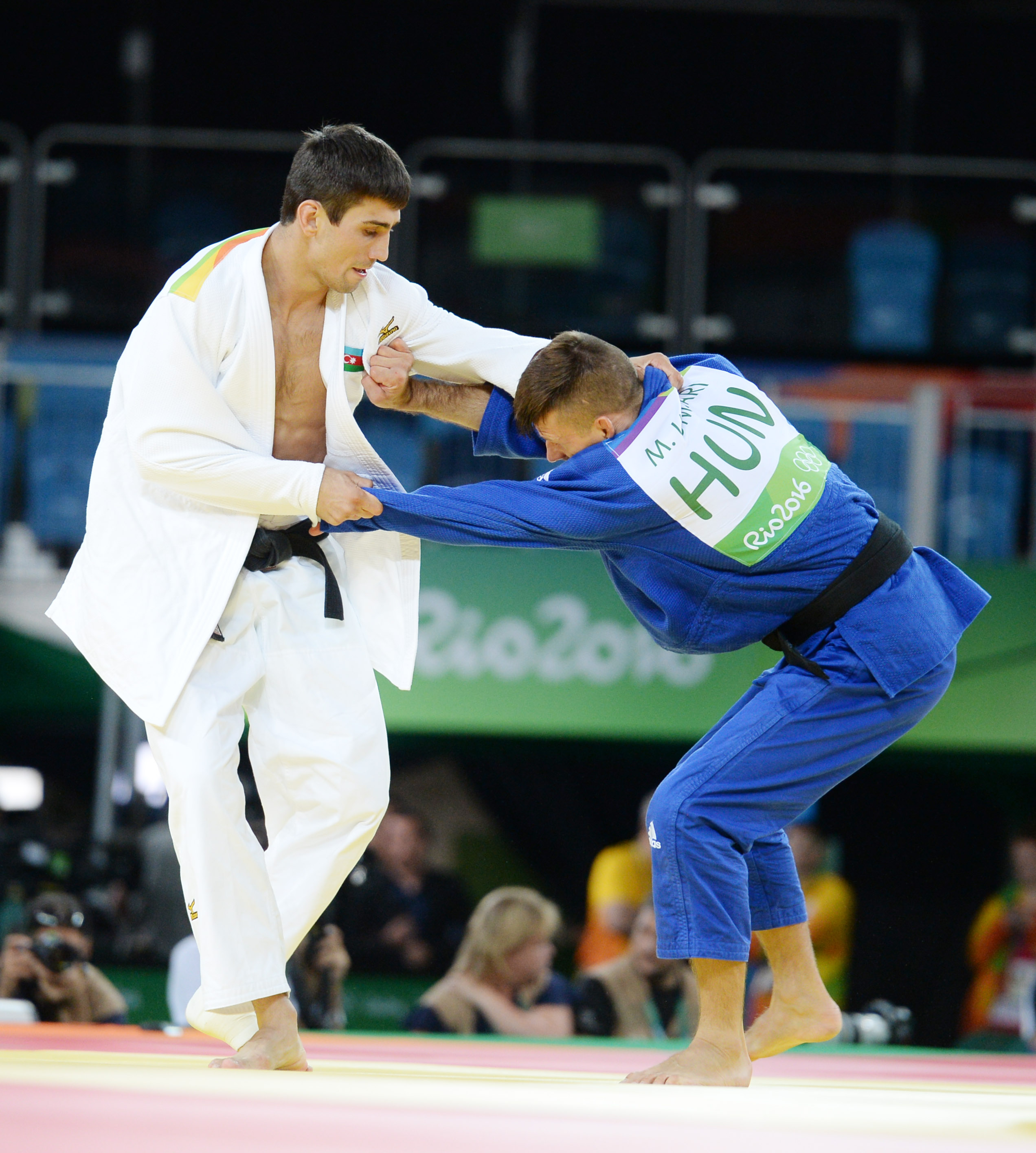
- Rustam Orujov from Azerbaijan vs Miklos Ungvari from Hungary. Quarterfinal
- Venue: Carioca Arena 2
- Date: 8 August 2016
- Competitors: 36 from 36 nations

Medalists
1st place, gold medalist(s)		Shohei Ono	Japan
2nd place, silver medalist(s)		Rustam Orujov	Azerbaijan
3rd place, bronze medalist(s)		Lasha Shavdatuashvili	Georgia
3rd place, bronze medalist(s)		Dirk Van Tichelt	Belgium

The men's 73 kg competition in judo at the 2016 Summer Olympics in Rio de Janeiro was held on 8 August at the Carioca Arena 2.

The gold and silver medals were determined by a single-elimination tournament, with the winner of the final taking gold and the loser receiving silver. Judo events awarded two bronze medals. Quarterfinal losers competed in a repechage match for the right to face a semifinal loser for a bronze medal (that is, the judokas defeated in quarterfinals A and B competed against each other, with the winner of that match facing the semifinal loser from the other half of the bracket).

The medals for the competition were presented by Alex Gilady, Israel, member of the International Olympic Committee and the gifts were presented by Haruki Uemura, International Judo Federation executive committee member.

== Results ==
=== Finals ===
Semi-finals
Dirk Van Tichelt (BEL)	000
Shohei Ono (JPN)	111
Rustam Orujov (AZE)	001
Sagi Muki (ISR)	000

Final
Shohei Ono (JPN)	110
Rustam Orujov (AZE)	000

=== Repechages ===
Repechage		Bronze medal
Denis Iartcev (RUS)	001
Lasha Shavdatuashvili (GEO)	100	Lasha Shavdatuashvili (GEO)	100
		Sagi Muki (ISR)	000

Repechage		Bronze medal
Miklós Ungvári (HUN)	000
Nicholas Delpopolo (USA)	000	Miklós Ungvári (HUN)	000
		Dirk Van Tichelt (BEL)	100

=== Pool A ===
First round
Hong Kuk-hyon (PRK)	000
Pierre Duprat (FRA)	100

Second round
An Chang-rim (KOR)	110
Mohamad Kasem (SYR)	000
Morad Zemouri (QAT)	000
Dirk Van Tichelt (BEL)	100
Denis Iartcev (RUS)	000
Pierre Duprat (FRA)	000
Sai Yinjirigala (CHN)	001
Alex Pombo (BRA)	000

Third round
An Chang-rim (KOR)	000
Dirk Van Tichelt (BEL)	010
Denis Iartcev (RUS)	100
Sai Yinjirigala (CHN)	000

Quarterfinals
Dirk Van Tichelt (BEL)	011
Denis Iartcev (RUS)	010

=== Pool B ===
First round
Magdiel Estrada (CUB)	010
Jaromír Ježek (CZE)	002

Second round
Lasha Shavdatuashvili (GEO)	100
Magdiel Estrada (CUB)	000
Chamara Repiyallage (SRI)	101
Benjamin Waterhouse (ASA)	000
Shohei Ono (JPN)	100
Miguel Murillo (CRC)	000
Victor Scvortov (UAE)	101
Zeyad Mater (YEM)	000

Third round
Lasha Shavdatuashvili (GEO)	100
Chamara Repiyallage (SRI)	000
Shohei Ono (JPN)	100
Victor Scvortov (UAE)	000

Quarterfinals
Lasha Shavdatuashvili (GEO)	000
Shohei Ono (JPN)	010

=== Pool C ===
First round
Faye Njie (GAM)	000
Didar Khamza (KAZ)	002

Second round
Rustam Orujov (AZE)	000
Didar Khamza (KAZ)	000
Andrew Thomas Mlugu (TAN)	000
Jake Bensted (AUS)	100
Mirali Sharipov (UZB)	000
Dex Elmont (NED)	010
Miklós Ungvári (HUN)	011
Nuno Saraiva (POR)	000

Third round
Rustam Orujov (AZE)	100
Jake Bensted (AUS)	000
Dex Elmont (NED)	000
Miklós Ungvári (HUN)	100

Quarterfinals
Rustam Orujov (AZE)	010
Miklós Ungvári (HUN)	000

=== Pool D ===
First round

Second round
Sagi Muki (ISR)	100
Rok Drakšič (SLO)	000
Igor Wandtke (GER)	000
Josue Deprez (HAI)	000
Ganbaataryn Odbayar (MGL)	100
Mohamed Mohy Eldin (EGY)	001
Ahmed Goumar (NIG)	000
Nicholas Delpopolo (USA)	100

Third round
Sagi Muki (ISR)	010
Igor Wandtke (GER)	000
Ganbaataryn Odbayar (MGL)	000
Nicholas Delpopolo (USA)	010

Quarterfinals
Sagi Muki (ISR)	100
Nicholas Delpopolo (USA)	000
