= Shohei Ono =

Japanese judoka (born 1992)

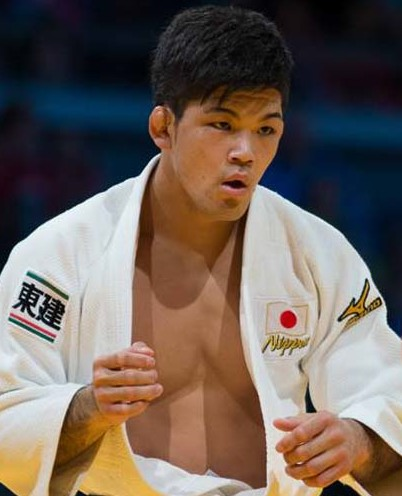
- Ono in 2016

Personal information
- Native name: 大野将平
- Born: 3 February 1992 (age 34) Yamaguchi, Japan
- Occupation: Judoka
- Height: 173 cm (5 ft 8 in)

Sport
- Country: Japan
- Sport: Judo
- Weight class: –73 kg
- Rank: 5th dan black belt
- Club: Asahi Kasei
- Team: All Japan National Team
- Retired: December 2022

Achievements and titles
- Olympic Games: (gold) (2016, 2020)
- World Champ.: (gold) (2013, 2015, 2019)
- Asian Champ.: (gold) (2018)
Medal record
Men's judo
Representing Japan
Olympic Games
Gold medal – first place	2016 Rio de Janeiro	‍–‍73 kg
Gold medal – first place	2020 Tokyo	‍–‍73 kg
Silver medal – second place	2020 Tokyo	Mixed team
World Championships
Gold medal – first place	2013 Rio de Janeiro	‍–‍73 kg
Gold medal – first place	2014 Chelyabinsk	Men's team
Gold medal – first place	2015 Astana	‍–‍73 kg
Gold medal – first place	2015 Astana	Men's team
Gold medal – first place	2019 Tokyo	‍–‍73 kg
Gold medal – first place	2019 Tokyo	Mixed team
Bronze medal – third place	2013 Rio de Janeiro	Men's team
Asian Games
Gold medal – first place	2018 Jakarta	‍–‍73 kg
Asian Championships
Silver medal – second place	2012 Tashkent	‍–‍73 kg
IJF Grand Slam
Gold medal – first place	2012 Tokyo	‍–‍73 kg
Gold medal – first place	2018 Düsseldorf	‍–‍73 kg
Gold medal – first place	2018 Osaka	‍–‍73 kg
Gold medal – first place	2019 Düsseldorf	‍–‍73 kg
Gold medal – first place	2020 Düsseldorf	‍–‍73 kg
Silver medal – second place	2014 Tokyo	‍–‍73 kg
Bronze medal – third place	2013 Paris	‍–‍73 kg
IJF Grand Prix
Gold medal – first place	2015 Düsseldorf	‍–‍73 kg
Gold medal – first place	2016 Düsseldorf	‍–‍73 kg
World Juniors Championships
Gold medal – first place	2011 Cape Town	‍–‍73 kg

Profile at external databases
- IJF: 4018
- JudoInside.com: 68054
- Updated on 23 May 2023

Shohei Ono (大野将平, Ōno Shōhei; born 3 February 1992) is a Japanese retired judoka.

Ono is regarded as one of judo's top fighters, having won two Olympic gold medals, three World Championships and five Grand Slams. He was the most dominant lightweight wrestler of the 2010s having won in every major championship he competed since 2015. Ono specializes in osoto gari (having written his masters' thesis on it) and uchimata. He is known for his classical technique and all ippon style, holding one of the highest ippon rates in judo. Ono is also one of the most searched judokas on the Internet.

== Career ==
=== Breakthrough: Grand Slam Tokyo 2012 ===
Ono cemented his place as one of judo's biggest ippon players by winning the prestigious Grand Slam in Tokyo all by ippon. He defeated Lee Shing Him, Yertugan Torenov and Khashbaataryn Tsagaanbaatar in the Round of 32, quarter-final and semi-final by ippon, and Etienne Briand by ippon and two yukos in the Round of 16. He met then reigning world champion and Olympic silver medalist Riki Nakaya in the final. Ono defeated Nakaya with a stunning ippon by osoto gari, adding to a waza-ari he scored earlier on. This would prove to be a turning point in one of the most heated rivalries in the lightweight division, with Ono breaking Nakaya's dominance in the division. The rivalry between the two Japanese fighters would go on for six years.

==== Grand Slam Paris 2013 ====
Ono continued his ippon streak at the Grand Slam in Paris, where he defeated Luiz Alcaraz del Rey and Dirk Van Tichelt by ippon in the Round of 32 and quarter-final, and Ljubisa Kovacevic by ippon and yuko in the Round of 16. His run for a consecutive Grand Slam win ended in the semi-final, where he lost against Tsagaanbaatar by waza-ari. With 30 seconds on the clock, the Mongol threw Ono for waza-ari with Ono's signature uchi mata. The match was already sealed in the former's favour with two shidos against Ono. The Japanese then showed his ippon style again in the bronze medal contest against Benjamin Darbelet with an uchi mata ippon in just eight seconds.

=== Rise to prominence: 2013 World Championships ===
Ono became Japan's third lightweight champion in four years after Hiroyuki Akimoto and Nakaya at the World Championships in Rio de Janeiro. He faced off against Korea's double World Champion Wang Ki-chun in the Round of 64. Fifteen seconds into the fight, Wang attempted a drop morote seoi nage, however was unsuccessful in gaining a score. Ono countered with a juji gatame, but Wang easily escaped by lifting Ono off the ground. Wang then unsuccessfully threw Ono with the latter's single grip on his sleeve with an uchi mata. In a turn of events, Wang was controversially given four shidos to earn a hansoku make or disqualification, namely for three false attacks and breaking off a grip. He unexpectedly crashed out of the tournament in his first fight.

Ono met Neoklis Skouroumounis in his second fight, and scored a yuko early on with de ashi harai. He sealed the fight with ippon with uchi mata. Ono then faced Miklós Ungvári in the Round of 16, who had a similar fate to Wang. Ungvari picked up four shidos for a hansoku make, in the form of avoiding grips, stepping off the mat, attempting a false attack and passivity. Ono went on against Dex Elmont in the quarter-final, in which he again showed his ippon play. Ono scored first with an osoto gari to ushiro goshi for yuko. Elmont then scored a yuko to level the scores. The fight went to golden score with the fighters on equal grounds with a yuko and two shidos each. Ono defeated Elmont with a harai goshi for ippon, and was through to a semi-final against van Tichelt. Ono was ranked number 15, and van Tichelt thirteen places above him. Ono defeated him for a guaranteed medal with one of his best techniques, osoto gari, for ippon.

Ono was set against Ugo Legrand in the final. Ono attempted a double sleeve uchi mata and gained a yuko. Ono won the World title with a strong hane goshi that scored ippon, defeating Legrand. He was overwhelmed with winning the World title and was moved to tears.

Ono also won the Teams' bronze medal with Japan. In the quarter-final he faced Mirali Sharipov, and continued his dominance as a big ippon fighter by defeating the Uzbek with an osoto gari for waza-ari, and uchi mata for ippon.

=== 2014 Grand Slam Tokyo ===
He lost to Hiroyuki Akimoto of Japan in the finals.

=== 2016 Olympics ===
For me, it's the Ono style of judo. What I wanted to do was demonstrate that the Ono style is the strongest judo style – the number one judo style. That certainly was the goal entering the Olympics.

— Ono on his iconic Japanese fighting style

=== 2020 Olympics ===
Ono won the gold medal in the 73 kg competition at the 2020 Olympics held in Tokyo, Japan. In the final, he beat Georgia's Lasha Shavdatuashvili in Golden Score.

== Competitive record ==
Judo Record
Total	111 (100.0%)
Wins	101 (90.99%)
by Ippon	73 (65.76%)
Losses	10 (9.01%)
by Ippon	3 (2.70%)

(as of 18 August 2021)
