= Tarlan Hasanov =

Azerbaijani judo and sambo coach

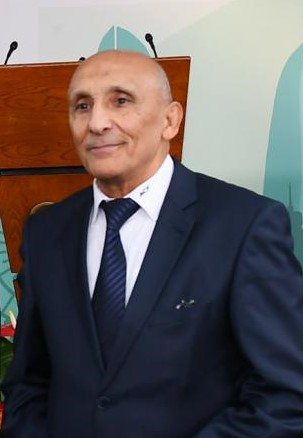
- Hasanov in 2019

Personal information
- Native name: Tərlan Həsənov
- Born: 26 November 1942 (age 83) Gazakh, Azerbaijan SSR, Soviet Union
- Education: Azerbaijan State University
- Occupation(s): Judo and sambo coach
- Years active: 1972–present

Tarlan Aliheydar oglu Hasanov (Azerbaijani: Tərlan Əliheydər oğlu Həsənov; born 26 November 1942) is an Azerbaijani and Soviet sambo and judo athlete and coach. Hasanov is one of the first coaches and referees in Azerbaijan in judo. He is the personal coach of Olympic judo champion Hidayat Heydarov.

== Biography ==
Tarlan Hasanov was born on 26 November 1942, in Gazakh of the Azerbaijan SSR, in the family of actor Aliheydar Hasanov and actress Rukhsara Aghayeva. A year after Tarlan's birth, his father was awarded the title of Honored Artist of the Azerbaijan SSR. In 1949, the family moved to Baku. In his childhood, Tarlan fell ill, underwent long treatment, and doctors forbade him from engaging in sports. However, when Tarlan turned 14, he secretly joined a freestyle wrestling section. His first coach was Rashid Mammadbeyov, a silver medalist at the 1952 Summer Olympics in Helsinki. Soon after, Hasanov won the Baku Championship. Upon learning about his son's achievement, Aliheydar Hasanov allowed him to continue wrestling.

During his service in the Airborne Forces in Belarus, Tarlan Hasanov was introduced to sambo and judo. After completing his military service, he began practicing sambo at Dynamo Sports Society, frequently winning medals at Baku and Azerbaijan championships. At the same time, Hasanov worked as the head of the artistic department at the Azerbaijan State Song Theatre.

Tarlan Hasanov graduated from the Faculty of History of Azerbaijan State University.

== Coaching career ==
In August 1972, he started conducting training sessions in judo and sambo at the Lokomotiv Sports Society. At that time, judo was not developed in Azerbaijan or the Soviet Union. Soviet sambo athletes participated in European championships, but since judo was a Japanese sport and considered "capitalist", Soviet athletes were not allowed to participate in judo competitions. However, on 22 November 1972, the USSR Sports Committee decided to develop judo throughout the Soviet Union. Two years later, by a decision of the Sports Committee, Hasanov was appointed as the head coach of the Soviet Union junior and schoolboys team.

In 2012, together with his student Azer Asgarov, he opened the Judo Club 2012 in central Baku.

Tarlan Hasanov’s students have gained various medals at the USSR, European, and World championships, as well as many other international competitions. Hasanov has also been the coach of the personal trainers of two Olympic champions—Aghayar Akhundzade (coach of Olympic champion Nazim Huseynov) and Yashar Allahverdi (coach of Olympic champion Elnur Mammadli). Some of his other trainees include Rasim Aghamirov, Mammadali Mehdiyev, Ilgar Mushkiyev, and Murad Fatiyev. On July 29, 2024, one of his trainees, Hidayat Heydarov, won the Olympic gold at the Paris Olympics.

Hasanov is the president of the Kanokan TT professional Judo sports club and continues to actively engage in coaching and pedagogical activities.

== Awards ==
Tarlan Hasanov has received several notable awards throughout his career. In 1980, he was appointed as a judge of the all-union category. In 1989, he was named the Honored Trainer of the Azerbaijan SSR. In 2019, he was awarded the title of Honored Worker of Physical Culture and Sports of Azerbaijan by a presidential decree. In October 2021, he was awarded with the Japanese Order of the Rising Sun for his role in Azerbaijan–Japan relations. On 3 October 2022, he received the Shohrat Order from President Ilham Aliyev for his contributions to the development of Azerbaijani judo. On 13 August 2024, he was awarded the 1st degree of the For Service to the Fatherland Order by the President of Azerbaijan for his achievements at the 2024 Summer Olympics in Paris and his overall contributions to Azerbaijani sports.
