= Alexander Turner (judoka) =

American judoka (born 1993)

Personal information
- Nationality: American
- Born: 10 April 1993 (age 33)
- Occupation: Judoka

Sport
- Country: United States
- Sport: Judo
- Weight class: –73 kg

Achievements and titles
- World Champ.: R32 (2017)
- Pan American Champ.: (2017)
Medal record
Men's judo
Representing United States
Pan American Championships
Bronze medal – third place	2017 Panama City	–73 kg
IJF Grand Prix
Bronze medal – third place	2017 Cancún	–73 kg

Profile at external databases
- IJF: 12821
- JudoInside.com: 58635
- Updated on 7 December 2022

Alexander Turner (born 10 April 1993) is an American judoka.

He is the bronze medallist of the 2017 Judo Grand Prix Cancún in the -73 kg category.
