= Alxasava =

- Municipality
- Location within Azerbaijan
- Coordinates: 40°34′15″N 47°56′12″E
- Country: Azerbaijan
- Rayon: Goychay

Population
  - Total: 780
- Time zone: UTC+4 (AZT)
  - Summer (DST): UTC+5 (AZT)

Alxasava (also, Alxasova, Alxasoba, Alkhasava Pervoye, and Birindzhi-Alkhasova) is a village and municipality in the Goychay Rayon of Azerbaijan. It has a population of 780.
