= Chamara Repiyallage =

Sri Lankan judoka (born 1992)

Personal information
- Born: 10 May 1992 (age 34) Gampola, Sri Lanka
- Occupation: Judoka
- Height: 160 cm (5 ft 3 in)

Sport
- Country: Sri Lanka
- Sport: Judo
- Weight class: ‍–‍73 kg
- Club: Buddha Judo Club

Achievements and titles
- Olympic Games: R16 (2016)
- World Champ.: R64 (2017, 2019)
- Asian Champ.: R16 (2015, 2023)
- Commonwealth Games: 7th (2022)

Profile at external databases
- IJF: 34167
- JudoInside.com: 72084
- Updated on 3 October 2023

Chamara Repiyallage (born 10 May 1992), also known as Chamara Dharmawardana, is a Sri Lankan judoka. He is also attached with the Sri Lankan Air Force.

== Career ==
Chamara represented Sri Lanka at the 2014 Commonwealth Games which was his maiden appearance at the Commonwealth Games. He competed in the men's 73kg event at the 2014 Commonwealth Games and reached round of 16 before being eliminated by Jake Bensted.

He represented Sri Lanka at the 2016 Summer Olympics which also marked his debut Olympic appearance and competed in the men's 73 kg event, in which he was eliminated in the third round by Lasha Shavdatuashvili. He clinched a silver medal in the 73kg event at the 2016 South Asian Games.

He also competed in the men's 73kg event at the 2017 World Judo Championships and also competed in the men's 73kg event at the 2019 World Judo Championships He made his Asian Games debut during the 2018 Asian Games and competed in the men's 73kg event. He secured a gold medal in the 73kg category at the 2019 South Asian Games.

Chamara has qualified for the 2020 Summer Olympics through an invitation from the Tripartite Commission, and will be Sri Lanka's flag bearer at the Parade of Nations alongside gymnast Milka Gehani.
