= Pierre Duprat =

French judoka (born 1989)

Personal information
- Born: 26 November 1989 (age 36)
- Occupation: Judoka

Sport
- Country: France
- Sport: Judo
- Weight class: ‍–‍73 kg

Achievements and titles
- Olympic Games: R32 (2016)
- World Champ.: R16 (2014)
- European Champ.: (bronze) (2013)
Medal record
Men's judo
Representing France
World Championships
Bronze medal – third place	2017 Budapest	Mixed team
European Championships
Bronze medal – third place	2013 Budapest	‍–‍73 kg
IJF Grand Slam
Bronze medal – third place	2017 Ekaterinburg	‍–‍73 kg
IJF Grand Prix
Gold medal – first place	2013 Düsseldorf	‍–‍73 kg
Gold medal – first place	2014 Astana	‍–‍73 kg
Bronze medal – third place	2014 Tashkent	‍–‍73 kg
Bronze medal – third place	2015 Zagreb	‍–‍73 kg
European Junior Championships
Gold medal – first place	2008 Warsaw	‍–‍60 kg

Profile at external databases
- IJF: 732
- JudoInside.com: 36140
- Updated on 14 November 2022

Pierre Duprat (born 26 November 1989 in Agen) is a French judoka. He competed at the 2016 Summer Olympics in the men's 73 kg event, in which he was eliminated in the second round by Denis Iartcev.
