= Tohar Butbul =

Israeli judoka (born 1994)

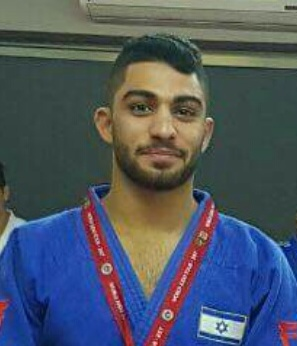
- Butbul in 2017

Personal information
- Native name: טוהר בוטבול
- Nationality: Israeli
- Born: 24 January 1994 (age 32) Tzoran, Israel
- Occupation: Judoka
- Height: 175 cm (5 ft 9 in)

Sport
- Country: Israel
- Sport: Judo
- Weight class: ‍–‍73 kg
- Rank: 5th dan black belt
- Coached by: Oren Smadja
- Retired: 27 February 2025

Achievements and titles
- Olympic Games: 7th (2020)
- World Champ.: 5th (2022)
- European Champ.: (silver) (2021)
- Highest world ranking: 4^{th}
Medal record
Men's judo
Representing Israel
Olympic Games
Bronze medal – third place	2020 Tokyo	Mixed team
European Championships
Silver medal – second place	2021 Lisbon	‍–‍73 kg
World Masters
Silver medal – second place	2019 Qingdao	‍–‍73 kg
IJF Grand Slam
Silver medal – second place	2019 Baku	‍–‍73 kg
Bronze medal – third place	2017 Paris	‍–‍73 kg
Bronze medal – third place	2017 Abu Dhabi	‍–‍73 kg
Bronze medal – third place	2018 Düsseldorf	‍–‍73 kg
Bronze medal – third place	2021 Tel Aviv	‍–‍73 kg
Bronze medal – third place	2022 Tel Aviv	‍–‍73 kg
Bronze medal – third place	2022 Ulaanbaatar	‍–‍73 kg
Bronze medal – third place	2022 Budapest	‍–‍73 kg
Bronze medal – third place	2024 Tbilisi	‍–‍73 kg
IJF Grand Prix
Gold medal – first place	2019 Zagreb	‍–‍73 kg
Gold medal – first place	2023 Linz	‍–‍73 kg
Silver medal – second place	2017 Cancún	‍–‍73 kg
Bronze medal – third place	2017 Antalya	‍–‍73 kg
Bronze medal – third place	2018 Zagreb	‍–‍73 kg
Bronze medal – third place	2019 Tel Aviv	‍–‍73 kg
European U23 Championships
Silver medal – second place	2016 Tel Aviv	‍–‍73 kg
European Junior Championships
Bronze medal – third place	2014 Bucharest	‍–‍73 kg

Profile at external databases
- IJF: 16638
- JudoInside.com: 85104
- Updated on 4 May 2025

Tohar Butbul (Hebrew: טוהר בוטבול; born 24 January 1994) is an Israeli retired Olympic judoka. He competes in the under 73 kg weight category, where he won silver medals at the 2019 World Masters and the 2021 European Championships, and won bronze medals in the 2017 Paris Grand Slam and 2017 Abu Dhabi Grand Slam. As of March 2018 he was ranked #9 in the world in the 73 kg division. He was a member of the Israeli team that won a bronze medal at the Tokyo Olympics. Butbul represented Israel at the 2024 Paris Olympics in judo in the men's 73 kg event in which he came in ninth, and in the mixed team event, in which Team Israel came in ninth.

== Early life ==
Butbul was born in Tzoran, Israel.

== Judo career ==
Butbul started training in judo when he was five years old at Israeli Olympic bronze medalist Oren Smadja's school.

=== 2014–20; European Junior Championships bronze medal ===
On 19 September, Butbul took part in the 2014 European Junior Championships which was held in Bucharest, Romania, and won a bronze medal after defeating Nuno Saraiva of Portugal in the medal match. He won the gold medal in the 2014 European Cup U21 Lignano. He also won the 2014 Israeli U21 Championships and the Israeli Championships in Ra'anana.

Butbul's first medal at a senior competition came at the 2016 European Open Sofia in Bulgaria in January as he won a bronze after he defeated Sam van 't Westende of the Netherlands. On 11 November, Butbul participated in the 2016 European U23 Championships in Tel Aviv and won the silver in the 73 kg weight category after losing to Hidayat Heydarov of Azerbaijan in the final.

On 11 February, Butbul took part at the prestigious 2017 Paris Grand Slam for the first time and won a bronze medal. In the quarter-final match he defeated local French Loïc Korval but lost in the semi-final to Japan's Soichi Hashimoto. He then battled for the bronze against Giyosjon Boboev of Uzbekistan and won after he got a waza-ari in golden score time. He also won the 2017 Israeli Championships in Ra'anana.

In April, Butbul won the bronze medal at the 2017 Antalya Grand Prix in Turkey after he defeated Rok Drakšič of Slovenia. Butbul participated in the 2017 European Championships held in Warsaw, Poland, and finished in 5th place after he lost in the semi-final to Russia's Musa Mogushkov and in the bronze medal match to Tommy Macias of Sweden. On June, he won the silver medal at the 2017 Cancún Grand Prix in Mexico. On October, he took part in the 2017 Abu Dhabi Grand Slam in the United Arab Emirates and won a bronze medal.

Butbul won bronze medals at the 2018 Zagreb Grand Prix in Croatia and in the 2018 Düsseldorf Grand Slam in Germany.

Butbul won the gold medal at the 2019 Zagreb Grand Prix, silver medals at the 2019 World Masters in Qingdao in China and the 2019 Baku Grand Slam in Azerbaijan, and a bronze medal at the 2019 Tel Aviv Grand Prix. He won a silver medal at the 2019 New York Open Team Championships. He also won the 2019 Israeli Championships in Tel Aviv.

=== 2020 Tokyo Olympics (in 2021); bronze medal ===
Butbul represented Israel at the 2020 Summer Olympics. Competing in the men's 73 kg weight category, Butbul was to start his competition fighting the winner of a match between Algerian Fethi Nourine and Sudanese Mohamed Abdalarasool – who both withdrew instead of facing an Israeli opponent in order to express solidarity with Palestine. Advancing without a fight to the round of 16, Butbul faced Moldova's Victor Sterpu, the 2020 European champion, and beat him with an ippon. At the quarterfinals, he lost to the South Korean 2018 world champion An Chang-rim, keeping a chance to win bronze through the repechage. Losing in the repechage to the Canadian 2016 Pan American champion Arthur Margelidon, Butbul finished the competition in seventh place.

In the mixed team event, Butbul was a member of the Israeli team that won a bronze medal. He competed three times and won one of his matches.

=== 2021–present; European Championships silver medal ===
Butbul won the silver medal in the 2021 European Championships in Lisbon in Portugal. He also won a bronze medal at the 2021 Tel Aviv Grand Slam in Israel.

Butbul won one of the bronze medals in his event at the 2022 Tel Aviv Grand Slam held in Israel. Butbul also won bronze medals in the 2022 Ulaanbaatar Grand Slam in Mongoloia and in the 2022 Budapest Grand Slam in Hungary.

Butbul won the gold medal in the 2023 Linz Grand Prix in Austria in May.

Butbul won a bronze medal at the 2024 Tbilisi Grand Slam in Georgia in March.

=== 2024 Paris Olympics ===
Butbul represented Israel at the 2024 Paris Olympics in judo in the men's 73 kg event, where he won his first match against Messaoud Dris of Algeria who was disqualified, lost his second match to world champion Hidayat Heydarov of Azerbaijan who went on to win the gold medal, and came in ninth. He also competed in the mixed team event, in which Team Israel came in ninth."

== See also ==
- List of Jewish Olympic medalists

== Titles ==
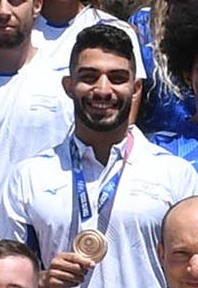
Butbul with his Olympic medal in 2021

Year	Tournament	Place	Ref.
2017	Grand Slam Paris	3rd place, bronze medalist(s)	
2017	Grand Prix Antalya	3rd place, bronze medalist(s)	
2017	Grand Prix Cancún	2nd place, silver medalist(s)	
2017	Grand Slam Abu Dhabi	3rd place, bronze medalist(s)	
2018	Grand Slam Düsseldorf	3rd place, bronze medalist(s)	
2018	Grand Prix Zagreb	3rd place, bronze medalist(s)	
2019	Grand Prix Tel Aviv	3rd place, bronze medalist(s)	
2019	Grand Slam Baku	2nd place, silver medalist(s)	
2019	Grand Prix Zagreb	1st place, gold medalist(s)	
2019	World Masters	2nd place, silver medalist(s)	
2021	Grand Slam Tel Aviv	3rd place, bronze medalist(s)	
2021	European Championships	2nd place, silver medalist(s)	
2022	Grand Slam Tel Aviv	3rd place, bronze medalist(s)	
2022	Grand Slam Ulaanbaatar	3rd place, bronze medalist(s)	
2022	Grand Slam Budapest	3rd place, bronze medalist(s)	
2023	Grand Prix Linz	1st place, gold medalist(s)	
