= Sai Yinjirigala =

Chinese judoka (born 1989)

Personal information
- Native name: 赛音吉日嘎拉
- Nickname: Harihu
- Born: 4 December 1989 (age 36) Zhenglan Banner, Xilingol League, Inner Mongolia
- Education: Ulanqab Sports School
- Occupation: Judoka
- Height: 1.75 m (5 ft 9 in)
- Weight: 73 kg (161 lb)

Sport
- Country: China
- Sport: Judo
- Weight class: ‍–‍73 kg

Achievements and titles
- Olympic Games: R16 (2016)
- World Champ.: 7th (2017)
- Asian Champ.: 5th (2017)
Medal record
Men's judo
Representing China
IJF Grand Slam
Bronze medal – third place	2016 Baku	‍–‍73 kg
IJF Grand Prix
Gold medal – first place	2015 Ulaanbaatar	‍–‍73 kg
Gold medal – first place	2017 Hohhot	‍–‍73 kg
Silver medal – second place	2016 Qingdao	‍–‍73 kg

Profile at external databases
- IJF: 13127
- JudoInside.com: 69505
- Updated on 24 November 2022

Sai Yinjirigala or Saiyinjirigala (Mongolian: Sainjargal; Chinese: 赛音吉日嘎拉; pinyin: Sàiyīnjírìgālā; born 4 December 1989 in Zhenglan Banner, Inner Mongolia) is a Chinese male judoka of Mongol ethnicity. He represented China at the 2016 Summer Olympics in Rio de Janeiro, Brazil.
