= Mohamed Abdalarasool =

Sudanese judoka

Personal information
- Born: 24 July 1993 (age 31)
- Occupation: Judoka

Sport
- Sport: Judo
- Weight class: –73 kg

Profile at external databases
- IJF: 44624
- JudoInside.com: 142003
- Updated on 31 October 2021

Mohamed Abdalarasool (Arabic: محمد عبد الرسول; born 24 July 1993) is a Sudanese judoka who competes in the under 73 kg (161 lb) category.

He competed in the Judo at the 2019 African Games as well as at the 2021 African Judo Championships. Selected to compete at the 2020 Summer Games, he received a walkover in the first round after his opponent Fethi Nourine pulled out in protest that a prospective second round opponent was an Israeli, Tohar Butbul, who was ranked 7th in the world in 2019. Although he appeared for the weigh in, Abdalarasool did not appear for his fight against Butbul, handing the Israeli a round of 16 berth without facing an opponent.
