= Lucas Diallo =

Burkinabé judoka

Lucas Telly Diallo (born 13 July 1996) is a Burkinabé judoka who competes in the under 73 kg category.

Selected to compete for Burkina Faso at the delayed 2020 Summer Games in Tokyo. He was lost in his first match against Cedric Bessi of Monaco.
