= Nuno Saraiva =

Portuguese judoka (born 1994)

Personal information
- Born: 16 March 1994 (age 32)
- Occupation: Judoka

Sport
- Country: Portugal
- Sport: Judo
- Weight class: ‍–‍73 kg

Achievements and titles
- Olympic Games: R32 (2016)
- World Champ.: R32 (2017)
- European Champ.: R32 (2016, 2018, 2019)
Medal record
Men's judo
Representing Portugal
IJF Grand Prix
Silver medal – second place	2015 Tashkent	‍–‍73 kg
Bronze medal – third place	2016 Samsun	‍–‍73 kg
World Juniors Championships
Bronze medal – third place	2014 Fort Lauderdale	‍–‍73 kg
European Junior Championships
Bronze medal – third place	2013 Sarajevo	‍–‍73 kg
European Cadet Championships
Bronze medal – third place	2010 Teplice	‍–‍73 kg

Profile at external databases
- IJF: 9393
- JudoInside.com: 53547
- Updated on 8 December 2022

Nuno Saraiva (born 16 March 1994) is a Portuguese judoka, who competed at the 2016 Summer Olympics in the 73 kg category.
