= Younis Eyal Slman =

Jordanian judoka

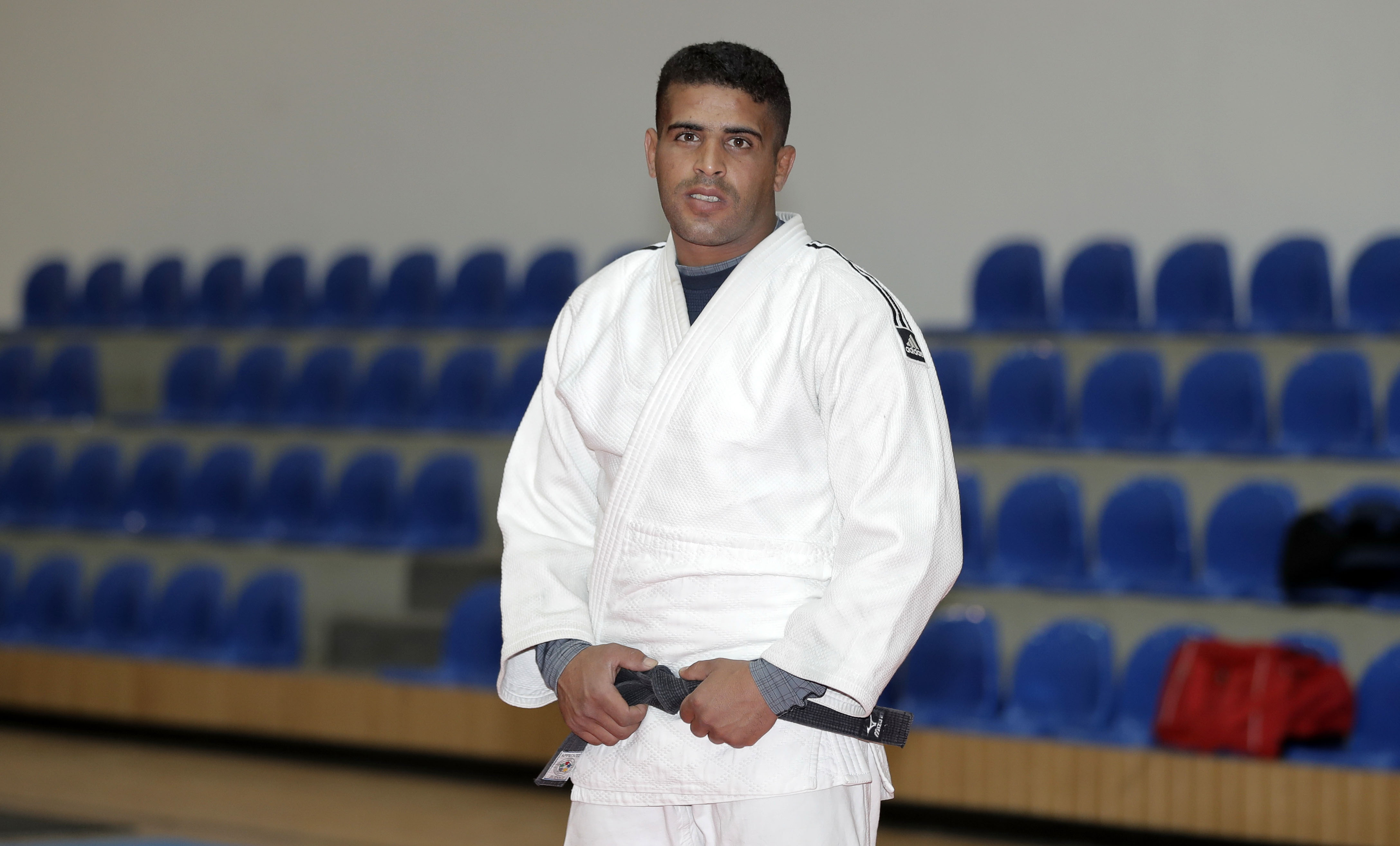

Personal information
- Nationality: Jordanian
- Born: 9 May 1993 (age 31)
- Occupation: Judoka

Sport
- Sport: Judo
- Weight class: –73 kg
- Updated on 31 October 2021

Younis Eyal Slman (Arabic: يونس عيال سلمان; born 9 May 1993) is a Jordanian judoka who competes in the under 73kg category.

Selected to compete at the delayed 2020 Summer Games in Tokyo, he was drawn in his first match against Bilal Çiloğlu who defeated him with ippon.
