= Rustam Orujov =

Azerbaijani judoka (born 1991)

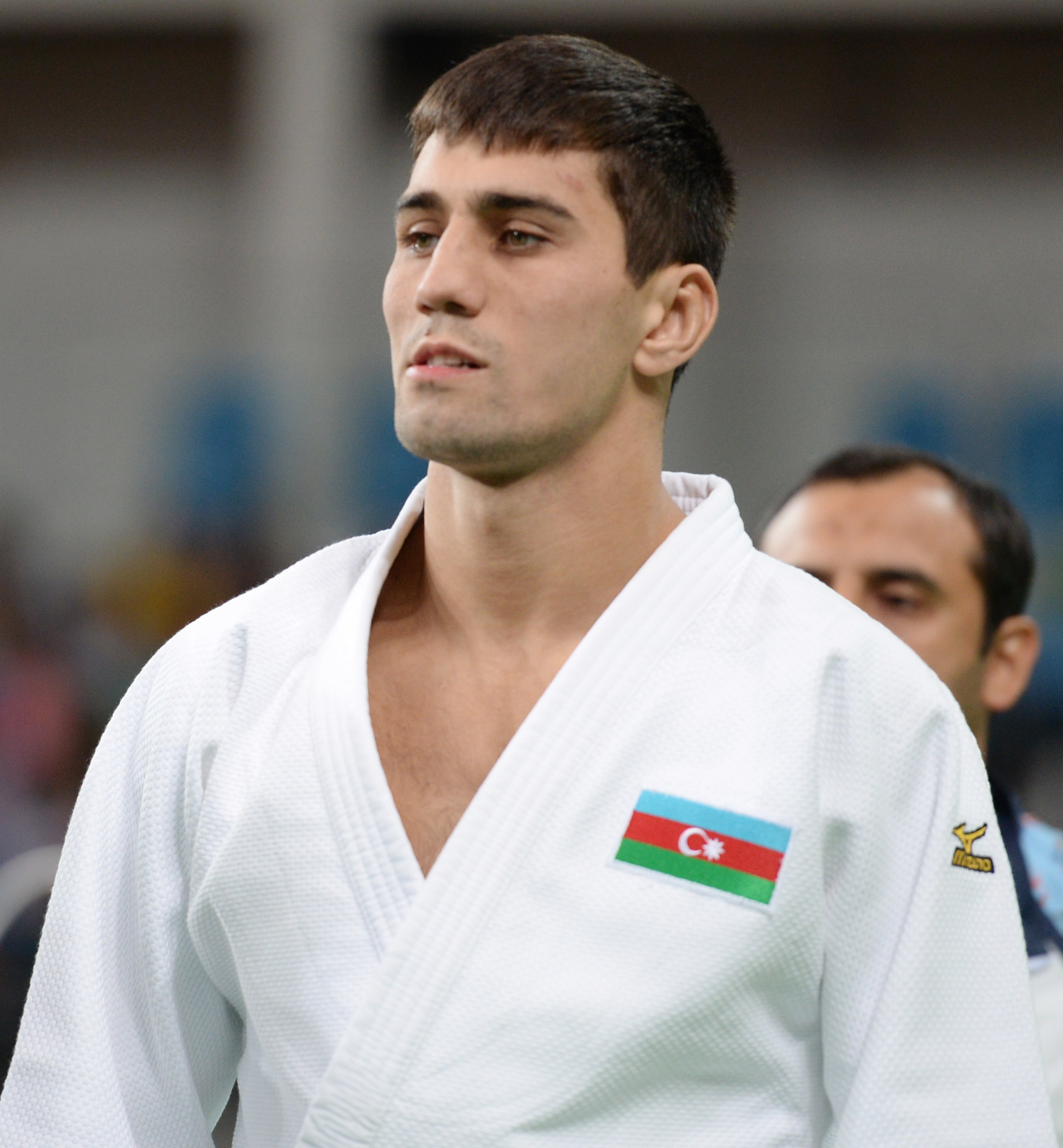

Personal information
- Full name: Rustam Fazail oglu Orujov
- Nationality: Azerbaijani
- Born: Rüstəm Fəzail oğlu Orucov; 4 October 1991 (age 34) Ust-Ilimsk, Irkutsk Oblast, Soviet Union
- Occupation: Judoka
- Height: 1.80 m (5 ft 11 in)
- Website: http://www.rustamorujov.com

Sport
- Country: Azerbaijan
- Sport: Judo
- Weight class: –73 kg
- Rank: 6th dan black belt

Achievements and titles
- Olympic Games: (silver) (2016)
- World Champ.: (silver) (2017, 2019)
- European Champ.: (gold) (2016)
Medal record
Men's judo
Representing Azerbaijan
Olympic Games
Silver medal – second place	2016 Rio de Janeiro	‍–‍73 kg
World Championships
Silver medal – second place	2017 Budapest	‍–‍73 kg
Silver medal – second place	2019 Tokyo	‍–‍73 kg
European Games
Silver medal – second place	2019 Minsk	‍–‍73 kg
European Championships
Gold medal – first place	2016 Kazan	‍–‍73 kg
Bronze medal – third place	2016 Kazan	Men's team
Bronze medal – third place	2017 Warsaw	‍–‍73 kg
Bronze medal – third place	2020 Prague	‍–‍73 kg
Bronze medal – third place	2022 Sofia	‍–‍73 kg
World Masters
Gold medal – first place	2018 Guangzhou	‍–‍73 kg
Bronze medal – third place	2015 Rabat	‍–‍73 kg
Bronze medal – third place	2016 Guadalajara	‍–‍73 kg
Bronze medal – third place	2019 Qingdao	‍–‍73 kg
IJF Grand Slam
Gold medal – first place	2013 Baku	‍–‍73 kg
Gold medal – first place	2015 Baku	‍–‍73 kg
Gold medal – first place	2020 Budapest	‍–‍73 kg
Silver medal – second place	2015 Paris	‍–‍73 kg
Silver medal – second place	2016 Abu Dhabi	‍–‍73 kg
Silver medal – second place	2018 Düsseldorf	‍–‍73 kg
Bronze medal – third place	2014 Baku	‍–‍73 kg
Bronze medal – third place	2014 Abu Dhabi	‍–‍73 kg
Bronze medal – third place	2016 Baku	‍–‍73 kg
Bronze medal – third place	2017 Baku	‍–‍73 kg
Bronze medal – third place	2017 Abu Dhabi	‍–‍73 kg
Bronze medal – third place	2019 Düsseldorf	‍–‍73 kg
Bronze medal – third place	2019 Baku	‍–‍73 kg
Bronze medal – third place	2020 Düsseldorf	‍–‍73 kg
Bronze medal – third place	2021 Tashkent	‍–‍73 kg
Bronze medal – third place	2022 Budapest	‍–‍73 kg
IJF Grand Prix
Gold medal – first place	2012 Baku	‍–‍73 kg
Gold medal – first place	2015 Tbilisi	‍–‍73 kg
Gold medal – first place	2015 Samsun	‍–‍73 kg
Gold medal – first place	2016 Havana	‍–‍73 kg
Gold medal – first place	2017 Zagreb	‍–‍73 kg
Silver medal – second place	2014 Samsun	‍–‍73 kg
Silver medal – second place	2015 Qingdao	‍–‍73 kg
Silver medal – second place	2016 Düsseldorf	‍–‍73 kg
Silver medal – second place	2019 Antalya	‍–‍73 kg
Bronze medal – third place	2014 Jeju	‍–‍73 kg
Bronze medal – third place	2015 Jeju	‍–‍73 kg
Bronze medal – third place	2018 Zagreb	‍–‍73 kg
Islamic Solidarity Games
Gold medal – first place	2017 Baku	Men's team
Silver medal – second place	2017 Baku	‍–‍73 kg

Profile at external databases
- IJF: 3496
- JudoInside.com: 71065
- Updated on 23 May 2023

Rustam Orujov (born 4 October 1991) is an Azerbaijani retired judoka. He competed in the men's 73 kg event at the 2012 Summer Olympics; after defeating Gideon van Zyl in the second round, he was eliminated by Mansur Isaev in the third round. He won the silver medal in the men's 73 kg event at the 2016 Summer Olympics.

== Biography ==
Rustam Orujov, was born October 4, 1991, in Russia, in the city of Ust-Ilimsk Irkutsk Region, to an Azerbaijani father and a Russian mother. At the age of seven he began to practice judo. He lived in the Irkutsk region until he was 16. He competed in various youth competitions. After moving to Baku, he began training in the famous "Attila" martial arts sports club. At youth level he won the championship of Eurasia, but failed to win the continental championship. Later, Orujov went to the senior level, initially competing in the 66 kg weight category. His first success at senior level came after Rustam Orujov began to compete in the 73 kg weight category.

In June 2011, at the European Cup in the Slovenian city of Celje Orujov he finished second, in October of the same year at the World Cup in Baku, where Orujov first started performing in weight up to 73 kg, – third. In February 2012, Orujov was fifth at the Grand Prix in Düsseldorf. That tournament, allowed him to score points for the Olympic license and Orujov was able to get through to the Olympics only through the continental quota of the European Judo Union. In May 2012 at the Grand Prix Baku Orujov has won first place.

On the 2012 Olympic Games in London in 1/16 Orujov won against Gideon van Zyl from South Africa, but lost to the future champion of the games Mansur Isaev of Russia.

In 2013, when Rustam Orujov returned from the Azerbaijani mandatory military service, he performed at the Grand Prix of Samsun, in which he was defeated due to lack of appropriate training. But in May 2013, Orujov was able to recover and became the winner of the tournament "Grand Slam", which was held in Baku. In 2014, at the next Grand Prix tournament in Samsun Orujov won the silver medal.

In 2015, at the Grand Prix in Georgia, Orujov won the gold medal. In 2016 he became the champion of Europe. Representing Azerbaijan at the 2016 Summer Olympics in Rio de Janeiro, where he won a silver medal in judo in the weight category up to 73 kg. September 1 decree of the President of Azerbaijan was awarded the Order "For Service to the Fatherland III degree."

In the -73 kg weight category he won silver at the 2017 and 2019 World Championships. He also won bronze medals at the 2017, 2020 and 2022 European Championships, and a silver at the 2019 European Games. He had to miss the 2021 European Championships due to testing positive for COVID.

Olympic Games
Preceded by Teymur Mammadov	Flagbearer for Azerbaijan; Tokyo 2020	Succeeded by Incumbent
