= Dmytro Kanivets =

Ukrainian judoka (born 1991)

Personal information
- Born: 22 August 1991 (age 34)
- Occupation: Judoka

Sport
- Country: Ukraine
- Sport: Judo
- Weight class: ‍–‍73 kg

Achievements and titles
- World Champ.: R32 (2017)
- European Champ.: R16 (2016)
Medal record
Men's judo
Representing Ukraine
IJF Grand Prix
Gold medal – first place	2016 Zagreb	‍–‍73 kg
Silver medal – second place	2016 Budapest	‍–‍73 kg
Summer Universiade
Silver medal – second place	2015 Gwangju	‍–‍73 kg
Bronze medal – third place	2015 Gwangju	Men's team

Profile at external databases
- IJF: 3675
- JudoInside.com: 46226
- Updated on 8 December 2022

Dmytro Kanivets (Ukrainian: Дмитро Канівець; born 22 August 1991) is a Ukrainian judoka.

Kanivets is the gold medalist of the 2016 Judo Grand Prix Zagreb in the ‍–‍73 kg category.
