= Ganbaataryn Odbayar =

Mongolian judoka (born 1989)

Personal information
- Native name: Ганбаатарын Одбаяр
- Born: 20 August 1989 (age 36) Ulaanbaatar, Mongolia
- Occupation: Judoka
- Height: 175 cm (5 ft 9 in)

Sport
- Country: Mongolia
- Sport: Judo
- Weight class: –73 kg

Achievements and titles
- Olympic Games: R16 (2016)
- World Champ.: (bronze) (2017)
- Asian Champ.: (silver) (2014, 2017)
Medal record
Men's judo
Representing Mongolia
World Championships
Bronze medal – third place	2015 Astana	Men's team
Bronze medal – third place	2017 Budapest	‍–‍73 kg
Asian Games
Silver medal – second place	2014 Incheon	‍–‍73 kg
Asian Championships
Silver medal – second place	2017 Hong Kong	‍–‍73 kg
Bronze medal – third place	2015 Kuwait City	‍–‍73 kg
World Masters
Silver medal – second place	2016 Guadalajara	‍–‍73 kg
IJF Grand Slam
Gold medal – first place	2017 Baku	‍–‍73 kg
Gold medal – first place	2017 Abu Dhabi	‍–‍73 kg
Bronze medal – third place	2019 Osaka	‍–‍73 kg
IJF Grand Prix
Silver medal – second place	2016 Tbilisi	‍–‍73 kg
Bronze medal – third place	2012 Abu Dhabi	‍–‍73 kg
Bronze medal – third place	2012 Qingdao	‍–‍73 kg
Bronze medal – third place	2015 Ulaanbaatar	‍–‍73 kg
Bronze medal – third place	2016 Havana	‍–‍73 kg

Profile at external databases
- IJF: 4224
- JudoInside.com: 53811
- Updated on 26 June 2023

Ganbaataryn Odbayar (born 20 August 1989) is a Mongolian judoka. He competed at the 2016 Summer Olympics in the men's 73 kg event, in which he was eliminated in the third round by Nicholas Delpopolo. He won a bronze medal at the 2017 World Judo Championships in Budapest.
