= Guillaume Chaine =

French judoka (born 1986)

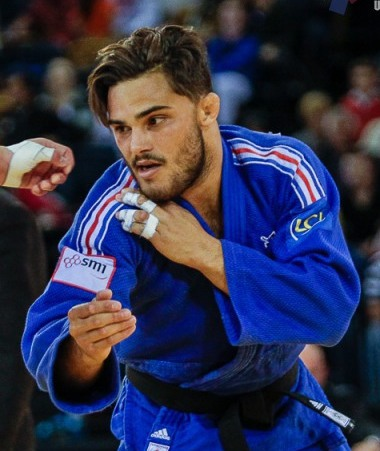
- Chaine in 2015

Personal information
- Nationality: French
- Born: 24 October 1986 (age 39) Colombes, France
- Occupation: Judoka

Sport
- Country: France
- Sport: Judo
- Weight class: –73 kg

Achievements and titles
- Olympic Games: R32 (2020)
- World Champ.: R16 (2018, 2019)
- European Champ.: R16 (2020)
Medal record
Men's judo
Representing France
Olympic Games
Gold medal – first place	2020 Tokyo	Mixed team
European Games
Bronze medal – third place	2019 Minsk	Mixed team
European Championships
Gold medal – first place	2022 Mulhouse	Mixed team
IJF Grand Slam
Silver medal – second place	2015 Tyumen	–73 kg
IJF Grand Prix
Gold medal – first place	2019 Tbilisi	–73 kg
Bronze medal – third place	2017 Düsseldorf	–73 kg
Bronze medal – third place	2019 Antalya	–73 kg
Bronze medal – third place	2019 Perth	–73 kg

Profile at external databases
- IJF: 2420
- JudoInside.com: 24856
- Updated on 13 November 2022

Guillaume Chaine (born 24 October 1986) is a French judoka.

He participated at the 2018 World Judo Championships, winning a medal.

On 12 November 2022 he won a gold medal at the 2022 European Mixed Team Judo Championships as part of team France.
