= Sam van 't Westende =

Dutch judoka (born 1991)

Personal information
- Nationality: Dutch
- Born: 6 August 1991 (age 34)
- Occupation: Judoka

Sport
- Country: Netherlands
- Sport: Judo
- Weight class: ‍–‍73 kg

Achievements and titles
- World Champ.: R32 (2015)
- European Champ.: 7th (2016)
Medal record
Men's judo
Representing the Netherlands
IJF Grand Prix
Bronze medal – third place	2018 Tbilisi	‍–‍73 kg

Profile at external databases
- IJF: 4604
- JudoInside.com: 31058
- Updated on 1 December 2022

Sam van 't Westende (born 6 August 1991) is a Dutch judoka.

van 't Westende is a bronze medalist from the 2018 Judo Grand Prix Tbilisi in the ‍–‍73 kg category.
