= Artem Khomula =

Ukrainian judoka (born 1995)

Personal information
- Nationality: Ukrainian
- Born: 19 May 1995 (age 31)
- Occupation: Judoka

Sport
- Country: Ukraine
- Sport: Judo
- Weight class: –73 kg

Achievements and titles
- World Champ.: R16 (2017, 2018)
- European Champ.: 7th (2018)
Medal record
Men's judo
Representing Ukraine
European Games
Bronze medal – third place	2015 Baku	Men's team
IJF Grand Prix
Bronze medal – third place	2016 Budapest	‍–‍73 kg
Bronze medal – third place	2019 Tel Aviv	‍–‍73 kg
European U23 Championships
Bronze medal – third place	2015 Bratislava	‍–‍73 kg
European Junior Championships
Bronze medal – third place	2015 Oberwart	‍–‍73 kg

Profile at external databases
- IJF: 17442
- JudoInside.com: 86699
- Updated on 21 May 2023

Artem Khomula (Ukrainian: Артем Хомула; born 19 May 1995) is a Ukrainian judoka.

He is the bronze medalist of the 2019 Judo Grand Prix Tel Aviv in the ‍–‍73 kg category.
