= Anthony Zingg =

German judoka (born 1993)

Personal information
- Born: 17 October 1993 (age 32)
- Occupation: Judoka

Sport
- Country: Germany
- Sport: Judo
- Weight class: ‍–‍73 kg

Achievements and titles
- World Champ.: R32 (2017)
- European Champ.: R16 (2021)
Medal record
Men's judo
Representing Germany
IJF Grand Slam
Bronze medal – third place	2019 Brasilia	‍–‍73 kg
IJF Grand Prix
Bronze medal – third place	2017 The Hague	‍–‍73 kg
Bronze medal – third place	2018 Agadir	‍–‍73 kg
Bronze medal – third place	2018 Hohhot	‍–‍73 kg
Bronze medal – third place	2019 Montreal	‍–‍73 kg
European U23 Championships
Gold medal – first place	2015 Bratislava	‍–‍73 kg
European Junior Championships
Silver medal – second place	2013 Sarajevo	‍–‍66 kg

Profile at external databases
- IJF: 11987
- JudoInside.com: 53836
- Updated on 21 November 2022

Anthony Zingg (born 17 October 1993) is a German judoka.

Zingg is a bronze medalist from the 2019 Judo Grand Slam Brasilia in the ‍–‍73 kg category.
