= Denis Iartsev =

Russian judoka (born 1990)

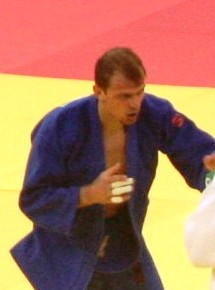

Personal information
- Full name: Denis Nikolayevich Iartsev
- Nationality: Russian
- Born: 18 September 1990 (age 35) Chelyabinsk, Russia
- Occupation: Judoka
- Height: 1.76 m (5 ft 9 in)

Sport
- Country: Russia
- Sport: Judo
- Weight class: –73 kg

Achievements and titles
- Olympic Games: 7th (2016)
- World Champ.: (bronze) (2019)
- European Champ.: 5th (2015, 2016)
Medal record
Men's judo
Representing Russia
World Championships
Silver medal – second place	2013 Rio de Janeiro	Men's team
Silver medal – second place	2014 Chelyabinsk	Men's team
Bronze medal – third place	2018 Baku	Mixed team
Bronze medal – third place	2019 Tokyo	‍–‍73 kg
European Games
Gold medal – first place	2019 Minsk	Mixed team
Bronze medal – third place	2015 Baku	Men's team
European Championships
Silver medal – second place	2014 Montpellier	Men's team
Silver medal – second place	2017 Warsaw	Men's team
Bronze medal – third place	2018 Yekaterinburg	Mixed team
World Masters
Gold medal – first place	2015 Rabat	‍–‍73 kg
Bronze medal – third place	2016 Guadalajara	‍–‍73 kg
IJF Grand Slam
Gold medal – first place	2014 Tyumen	‍–‍73 kg
Silver medal – second place	2013 Moscow	‍–‍73 kg
Silver medal – second place	2016 Paris	‍–‍73 kg
Bronze medal – third place	2013 Tokyo	‍–‍73 kg
IJF Grand Prix
Gold medal – first place	2017 Düsseldorf	‍–‍73 kg
Gold medal – first place	2019 Marrakesh	‍–‍73 kg
Silver medal – second place	2018 Cancún	‍–‍73 kg
Bronze medal – third place	2017 Hohhot	‍–‍73 kg
Bronze medal – third place	2019 Tbilisi	‍–‍73 kg
Bronze medal – third place	2019 Zagreb	‍–‍73 kg
European U23 Championships
Bronze medal – third place	2010 Sarajevo	‍–‍73 kg
Bronze medal – third place	2011 Tyumen	‍–‍73 kg
Summer Universiade
Gold medal – first place	2011 Shenzhen	‍–‍73 kg

Profile at external databases
- IJF: 13070
- JudoInside.com: 42985
- Updated on 23 May 2023

Denis Nikolayevich Iartsev (Russian: Денис Николаевич Ярцев; born 18 September 1990) is a Russian judoka. He competed at the 2016 Summer Olympics in the men's 73 kg event, in which he was eliminated by Lasha Shavdatuashvili in the repechage.
