= Tommy Macias =

Swedish judoka (born 1993)

Personal information
- Nationality: Swedish
- Born: 20 January 1993 (age 33) Nacka, Sweden
- Occupation: Judoka

Sport
- Country: Sweden
- Sport: Judo
- Weight class: –73 kg

Achievements and titles
- Olympic Games: R16 (2020)
- World Champ.: (silver) (2021)
- European Champ.: (gold) (2019)
Medal record
Men's judo
Representing Sweden
World Championships
Silver medal – second place	2021 Budapest	‍–‍73 kg
European Games
Gold medal – first place	2019 Minsk	‍–‍73 kg
European Championships
Bronze medal – third place	2017 Warsaw	‍–‍73 kg
Bronze medal – third place	2018 Tel Aviv	‍–‍73 kg
Bronze medal – third place	2020 Prague	‍–‍73 kg
World Masters
Bronze medal – third place	2017 Saint Petersburg	‍–‍73 kg
IJF Grand Slam
Gold medal – first place	2016 Abu Dhabi	‍–‍73 kg
Gold medal – first place	2019 Ekaterinburg	‍–‍73 kg
Bronze medal – third place	2016 Tyumen	‍–‍73 kg
Bronze medal – third place	2018 Abu Dhabi	‍–‍73 kg
Bronze medal – third place	2018 Osaka	‍–‍73 kg
IJF Grand Prix
Gold medal – first place	2018 Antalya	‍–‍73 kg
Gold medal – first place	2018 Cancún	‍–‍73 kg
Silver medal – second place	2016 Zagreb	‍–‍73 kg
Silver medal – second place	2017 Tbilisi	‍–‍73 kg
Silver medal – second place	2017 Zagreb	‍–‍73 kg
Bronze medal – third place	2017 Düsseldorf	‍–‍73 kg

Profile at external databases
- IJF: 14517
- JudoInside.com: 56442
- Updated on 23 May 2023

Tommy Macias (born 20 January 1993) is a Swedish judoka. He is the 2018 and 2017 European bronze medalist in the 73 kg division. In 2018, he won the Grand Prix in Antalya and Cancun. He also took the bronze in Abu Dhabi Grand Slam and Osaka Grand Slam. In 2017, he took the bronze in IJF Masters St Petersburg and gold in Abu Dhabi Grand Slam. In 2019, he won the gold in Ekaterinburg Grand Slam.

He competed in the men's 73 kg event at the 2020 Summer Olympics in Tokyo, Japan.
