= Ferdinand Karapetian =

Armenian judoka (born 1992)

Personal information
- Nationality: Armenian
- Born: 19 December 1992 (age 33) Vardenis, Armenia
- Occupation: Judoka

Sport
- Country: Armenia
- Sport: Judo
- Weight class: –73 kg

Achievements and titles
- Olympic Games: R32 (2020)
- World Champ.: R64 (2017, 2021, 2023)
- European Champ.: (gold) (2018)
Medal record
Men's judo
Representing Armenia
European Championships
Gold medal – first place	2018 Tel Aviv	‍–‍73 kg
IJF Grand Slam
Silver medal – second place	2018 Ekaterinburg	‍–‍73 kg
Bronze medal – third place	2018 Düsseldorf	‍–‍73 kg
Bronze medal – third place	2021 Tashkent	‍–‍73 kg
IJF Grand Prix
Silver medal – second place	2020 Tel Aviv	‍–‍73 kg
Bronze medal – third place	2016 Samsun	‍–‍66 kg

Profile at external databases
- IJF: 27022
- JudoInside.com: 63876
- Updated on 21 May 2023

Ferdinand Karapetian (Armenian: Ֆերդինանդ Կարապետյանը; born 19 December 1992) is an Armenian judoka. He competes in the ‍–‍73 kg weight category and won a gold medal in the 2018 European Championships. He represented Armenia at the 2020 Summer Olympics.
