= Fabio Basile =

Italian judoka (born 1994)

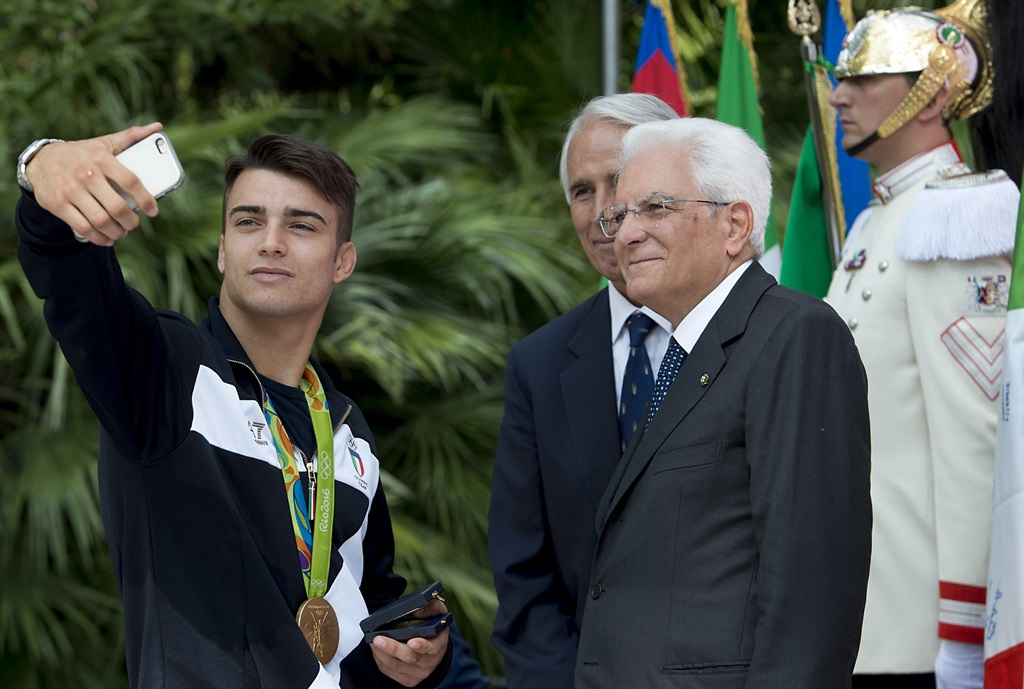
- Fabio Basile takes a selfie with the President of Italy Sergio Mattarella

Personal information
- Nationality: Italian
- Born: 7 October 1994 (age 31) Rivoli, Italy
- Occupation: Judoka
- Height: 1.72 m (5 ft 8 in)

Sport
- Country: Italy
- Sport: Judo
- Weight class: –66 kg, –73 kg

Achievements and titles
- Olympic Games: (gold) (2016)
- World Champ.: R16 (2019)
- European Champ.: (bronze) (2016)
Medal record
Men's judo
Representing Italy
Olympic Games
Gold medal – first place	2016 Rio de Janeiro	‍–‍66 kg
European Championships
Bronze medal – third place	2016 Kazan	‍–‍66 kg
IJF Grand Slam
Gold medal – first place	2021 Antalya	‍–‍73 kg
Silver medal – second place	2019 Ekaterinburg	‍–‍73 kg
Silver medal – second place	2026 Astana	‍–‍73 kg
Bronze medal – third place	2018 Ekaterinburg	‍–‍73 kg
Bronze medal – third place	2019 Paris	‍–‍73 kg
IJF Grand Prix
Gold medal – first place	2020 Tel Aviv	‍–‍73 kg
Silver medal – second place	2016 Tbilisi	‍–‍66 kg
Silver medal – second place	2018 Zagreb	‍–‍73 kg
Bronze medal – third place	2023 Linz	‍–‍66 kg
European U23 Championships
Gold medal – first place	2015 Bratislava	‍–‍66 kg
Bronze medal – third place	2012 Prague	‍–‍60 kg
World Juniors Championships
Bronze medal – third place	2010 Agadir	‍–‍55 kg
European Junior Championships
Bronze medal – third place	2014 Bucharest	‍–‍60 kg
European Cadet Championships
Silver medal – second place	2010 Teplice	‍–‍55 kg

Profile at external databases
- IJF: 3470
- JudoInside.com: 48498
- Updated on 10 May 2026

Fabio Basile (born 7 October 1994 in Rivoli) is an Italian judoka.

== Biography ==
He competed at the 2016 Summer Olympics in Rio de Janeiro and won the gold medal in the men's 66 kg on 7 August 2016 - the 200th Olympic gold medal for Italy.

Basile represents the judo club Akiyama Settimo from Settimo Torinese near Torino and is the club's first olympic champion.

== Author ==
Basile wrote his first book titled "L'impossibile non esiste" in 2021; it was published by Giunti.
