= Musa Mogushkov =

Russian judoka (born 1988)

Personal information
- Full name: Musa Khozh-Akhmatovich Mogushkov
- Nationality: Russian
- Born: Муса Хож-Ахматович Могушков; 6 February 1988 (age 38) Nazran, Checheno-Ingush ASSR, RSFSR, USSR (now Russia)
- Occupation: Judoka
- Height: 1.70 m (5 ft 7 in)

Sport
- Country: Russia
- Sport: Judo
- Weight class: –73 kg

Achievements and titles
- Olympic Games: R32 (2012, 2020)
- World Champ.: (bronze) (2011, 2014)
- European Champ.: (silver) (2017)
Medal record
Men's judo
Representing Russia
World Championships
Bronze medal – third place	2011 Paris	‍–‍66 kg
Bronze medal – third place	2014 Chelyabinsk	‍–‍73 kg
European Games
Gold medal – first place	2019 Minsk	Mixed team
European Championships
Silver medal – second place	2017 Warsaw	‍–‍73 kg
Bronze medal – third place	2021 Lisbon	‍–‍73 kg
World Masters
Bronze medal – third place	2010 Suwon	‍–‍66 kg
IJF Grand Slam
Gold medal – first place	2010 Moscow	‍–‍66 kg
Gold medal – first place	2011 Rio de Janeiro	‍–‍66 kg
Gold medal – first place	2016 Tyumen	‍–‍73 kg
Gold medal – first place	2019 Brasilia	‍–‍73 kg
Silver medal – second place	2010 Tokyo	‍–‍66 kg
Silver medal – second place	2011 Tokyo	‍–‍66 kg
Silver medal – second place	2014 Abu Dhabi	‍–‍73 kg
Silver medal – second place	2017 Abu Dhabi	‍–‍73 kg
Bronze medal – third place	2009 Rio de Janeiro	‍–‍66 kg
Bronze medal – third place	2011 Moscow	‍–‍66 kg
Bronze medal – third place	2015 Tyumen	‍–‍73 kg
Bronze medal – third place	2015 Tokyo	‍–‍73 kg
Bronze medal – third place	2016 Abu Dhabi	‍–‍73 kg
Bronze medal – third place	2018 Abu Dhabi	‍–‍73 kg
IJF Grand Prix
Gold medal – first place	2010 Abu Dhabi	‍–‍66 kg
Gold medal – first place	2013 Samsun	‍–‍73 kg
Gold medal – first place	2018 The Hague	‍–‍73 kg
Silver medal – second place	2018 Agadir	‍–‍73 kg
Bronze medal – third place	2014 Düsseldorf	‍–‍73 kg
Bronze medal – third place	2014 Tbilisi	‍–‍73 kg
Bronze medal – third place	2014 Havana	‍–‍73 kg
Bronze medal – third place	2015 Jeju	‍–‍73 kg
Bronze medal – third place	2019 Zagreb	‍–‍73 kg
European U23 Championships
Bronze medal – third place	2009 Antalya	‍–‍66 kg
European Junior Championships
Bronze medal – third place	2007 Prague	‍–‍66 kg

Profile at external databases
- IJF: 2150
- JudoInside.com: 38617
- Updated on 4 July 2023

Musa Khozh-Akhmatovich Mogushkov (Russian: Муса Хож-Ахматович Могушков; born 6 February 1988) is a Russian judoka. At the 2012 Summer Olympics he competed in the Men's 66 kg, but was defeated in the second round. He also competed in the men's 73 kg event at the 2020 Summer Olympics in Tokyo, Japan.
