= Georgios Azoidis =

Greek judoka (born 1993)

Personal information
- Born: 6 May 1993 (age 33)
- Occupation: Judoka

Sport
- Country: Greece
- Sport: Judo
- Weight class: ‍–‍73 kg

Achievements and titles
- World Champ.: R32 (2015)
- European Champ.: (bronze) (2019)
Medal record
Men's judo
Representing Greece
European Games
Bronze medal – third place	2019 Minsk	‍–‍73 kg
IJF Grand Prix
Bronze medal – third place	2019 Antalya	‍–‍73 kg
European Junior Championships
Gold medal – first place	2010 Samokov	‍–‍66 kg
Gold medal – first place	2012 Poreč	‍–‍66 kg
Gold medal – first place	2013 Sarajevo	‍–‍66 kg
European Cadet Championships
Silver medal – second place	2009 Koper	‍–‍60 kg

Profile at external databases
- IJF: 3415
- JudoInside.com: 46380
- Updated on 10 November 2022

Georgios Azoidis (born 6 May 1993) is a Greek judoka.

Azoidis is a bronze medalist from the 2019 European Games in the ‍–‍73 kg category.
