= Alexandru Raicu =

Romanian judoka (born 1996)

Personal information
- Full name: Alexandru Constantin Raicu
- Born: 20 December 1996 (age 29) Pitești
- Occupation: Judoka
- Height: 175 cm (5 ft 9 in)

Sport
- Country: Romania
- Sport: Judo
- Weight class: ‍–‍73 kg

Achievements and titles
- Olympic Games: R32 (2020)
- World Champ.: R16 (2024)
- European Champ.: 7th (2022)
Medal record
Men's judo
Representing Romania
IJF Grand Slam
Gold medal – first place	2021 Tel Aviv	‍–‍73 kg
Bronze medal – third place	2021 Paris	‍–‍73 kg
European Junior Championships
Bronze medal – third place	2014 Bucharest	‍–‍73 kg

Profile at external databases
- IJF: 17255
- JudoInside.com: 69742
- Updated on 20 May 2024

Alexandru Constantin Raicu (born 20 December 1996) is a Romanian judoka. He competed in the men's 73 kg event at the 2020 Summer Olympics in Tokyo, Japan.

Raicu is the 2021 Judo Grand Slam Tel Aviv champion in the ‍–‍73 kg class.
