= Miklós Ungvári =

Hungarian judoka (born 1980)

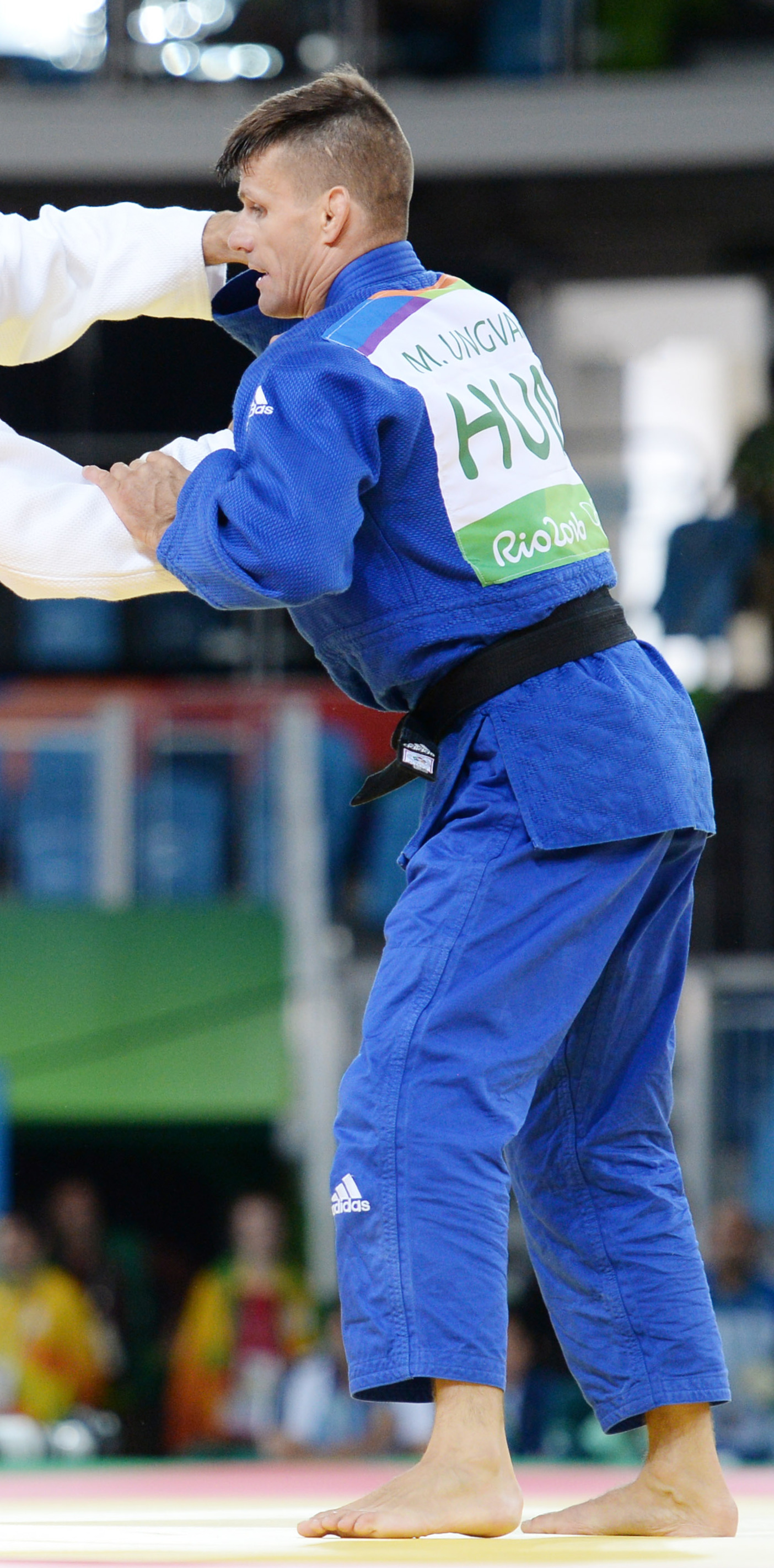
- Ungvári at the 2016 Olympics

Personal information
- Nationality: Hungarian
- Born: 15 October 1980 (age 45) Cegléd, Hungary
- Occupation: Judoka
- Height: 176 cm (5 ft 9 in)

Sport
- Country: Hungary
- Sport: Judo
- Weight class: ‍–‍66 kg, ‍–‍73 kg
- Club: Cegledi Vasutas Sportegyesulet
- Coached by: Robert Kovaks

Achievements and titles
- Olympic Games: (silver) (2012)
- World Champ.: (bronze) (2005, 2007, 2009)
- European Champ.: (gold) (2002, 2009, 2011)
Medal record
Men's judo
Representing Hungary
Olympic Games
Silver medal – second place	2012 London	‍–‍66 kg
World Championships
Bronze medal – third place	2005 Cairo	‍–‍66 kg
Bronze medal – third place	2007 Rio de Janeiro	‍–‍66 kg
Bronze medal – third place	2009 Rotterdam	‍–‍66 kg
European Championships
Gold medal – first place	2002 Maribor	‍–‍66 kg
Gold medal – first place	2009 Tbilisi	‍–‍66 kg
Gold medal – first place	2011 Istanbul	‍–‍66 kg
Silver medal – second place	2005 Rotterdam	‍–‍66 kg
Silver medal – second place	2008 Lisbon	‍–‍66 kg
Silver medal – second place	2010 Vienna	‍–‍66 kg
Bronze medal – third place	2014 Montpellier	‍–‍73 kg
IJF Grand Slam
Bronze medal – third place	2009 Paris	‍–‍66 kg
Bronze medal – third place	2009 Moscow	‍–‍66 kg
Bronze medal – third place	2010 Moscow	‍–‍66 kg
Bronze medal – third place	2014 Tokyo	‍–‍73 kg
Bronze medal – third place	2015 Baku	‍–‍73 kg
Bronze medal – third place	2017 Baku	‍–‍73 kg
IJF Grand Prix
Gold medal – first place	2015 Budapest	‍–‍73 kg
Gold medal – first place	2018 Budapest	‍–‍73 kg
Silver medal – second place	2010 Tunis	‍–‍66 kg
Silver medal – second place	2012 Abu Dhabi	‍–‍73 kg
Silver medal – second place	2013 Miami	‍–‍73 kg
Bronze medal – third place	2009 Hamburg	‍–‍66 kg
Bronze medal – third place	2010 Rotterdam	‍–‍66 kg
Bronze medal – third place	2013 Abu Dhabi	‍–‍73 kg
Bronze medal – third place	2014 Samsun	‍–‍73 kg
Bronze medal – third place	2014 Qingdao	‍–‍73 kg

Profile at external databases
- IJF: 240
- JudoInside.com: 9253
- Updated on 25 May 2023

Miklós Ungvári (born 15 October 1980) is a Hungarian former half-lightweight judoka who held the European title in 2002, 2009 and 2011. He competed at the 2004, 2008, 2012 and 2016 Olympics, winning a silver medal in 2012 and placing fifth in 2016.

Ungvári took up judo aged nine, and in October 2009 was named Judoka of the Week by the European Judo Union. Besides judo, he competed in equestrian show jumping and was a co-driver for the Sandlander team at the 2014 Dakar Rally. His brother Attila Ungvári also competes internationally in judo.

== Awards ==
- Hungarian Judoka of the Year: 2002, 2008, 2009, 2010, 2012
- Knight's Cross of the Order of Merit of the Republic of Hungary (2012)
