= Ebony Lane =

Australian sprinter (born 1998)

Personal information
- Nationality: Australian
- Born: 8 November 1998 (age 27)

Sport
- Sport: Track and Field
- Event: 100m

Achievements and titles
- Personal bests: 60m: 7.26 (Brisbane, 2026); 100m: 11.30 (Sydney, 2024); 4x100m : 42.83 (Nassau, 2024)
Medal record
Women's athletics
Representing Australia
Oceania Championships
Silver medal – second place	2026 Darwin	100 m
Silver medal – second place	2024 Suva	100 m

Ebony Lane (born 8 November 1998) is an Australian track and field athlete who competes as a sprinter.

== Early life ==
Lane spent part of her childhood in the town of Echuca, in Victoria.

== Career ==
In January 2021, Lane set a new Victorian state record over 100 yards when she ran 10.59 seconds in Geelong, to finish ahead of Celeste Mucci and Mia Gross.

In July 2023, Lane made her debut in a Diamond League event, competing in London at the 2023 Anniversary Games. In August 2023, Lane was part of the Australian squad selected to compete in the 4 × 100 m sprint relay at the 2023 World Athletics Championships in Budapest.

Lane first lowered her 100m personal best in 2024, to 11.33 seconds, at the ACT Championships in January, in Canberra. She lowered it again to 11.30 seconds at the Sydney Track Classic in March 2024.

Also at the 2024 Sydney Track Classic, Lane, along with Ella Connolly, Bree Masters and Torrie Lewis, was in an Australian 4 × 100 m relay team which set a new national record of 42.94 seconds. Lane also ran as part of the Australian 4 × 100 m relay team which ran at the 2024 World Relays Championships in Nassau, Bahamas in early May. There they ran even faster than they had in March, 42.83, to qualify for both the final, finishing 5th, and the 4 × 100 m relay event at the 2024 Paris Olympics.

Lane was second to Thewbelle Philp in the 60m sprint at the 2026 Australian Short Track Championships (7.27 sec; +0.9 m/s wind) on 7 February 2026. Lane was runner-up to Zoe Hobbs in the 100 metres at the Perth Track Classic on 14 February, with a wind-assisted 11.16 seconds (+2.2 m/s). Competing at the 2026 Maurie Plant Meet in Melbourne she won the 100 metres in 11.51. On 11 April 2026, she was third behind Georgia Harris and Chloe Mannix-Power in the final of 100 metres at the 2026 Australian Athletics Championships, running 11.54 seconds (-0.4 m/s). She was selected for the Australian team to compete at the 2026 World Athletics Relays in Gaborone, Botswana, running in the women's 4 x 100 m relay alongside Harris, Monique Hanlon and Torrie Lewis. On the second day, the quartet won their heat to successfully qualify for the 2027 World Championships. Later that month, Lane was runner-up to Zoe Hobbs in the 100 metres at the 2026 Oceania Athletics Championships in Darwin. She competed in the 100 metres at the 2026 Commonwealth Games in Glasgow, Scotland. Later at the Games, she also competed in the women's 4 × 100 m relay.

== Personal bests ==
Event	Time (s)	Wind (m/s)	Location	Date	Notes
60 metres	7.26	(+1.9 m/s)	Brisbane, Australia	17 January 2026	
100 metres	11.30	(±0.0 m/s)	Sydney, Australia	24 March 2024	
100 metres wind	11.16	(+2.2 m/s)	Perth, Australia	15 February 2026	
4x100m	42.83		Nassau, Bahamas	4 May 2024	Then an AR and NR

== Personal life ==
Lane has a Diploma in Sports Development, and a Diploma in Early Childhood Education and Care, and worked in childcare during the COVID-19 pandemic.
