= British Virgin Islands at the 2026 Commonwealth Games =

- Flag of British Virgin Islands
- CG code: IVB
- CGA: British Virgin Islands Olympic Committee
- Website: bviolympics.org

in Glasgow, Scotland 23 July 2026 – 2 August 2026
- Competitors: 11 in 1 sport
- Flag bearer: Adaejah Hodge
- Baton bearer: Jaleel Croal
- Medals Ranked =23rd: Gold 1 Silver 0 Bronze 0 Total 1

Commonwealth Games appearances (overview)
- 1990; 1994; 1998; 2002; 2006; 2010; 2014; 2018; 2022; 2026; 2030

The British Virgin Islands competed at the 2026 Commonwealth Games in Glasgow, Scotland. This marked The British Virgin Islands' tenth participation at the games, after making its debut at the 1990 Commonwealth Games.

The British Virgin Islands team was expected to consist of about 12 athletes. The King's Baton relay stopped in the British Virgin Islands in May 2025.

In July 2026, the final team of 11 athletes (five men and six women), all competing in track and field was officially named. Sprinter Adaejah Hodge was the country's flagbearer during the opening ceremony. Meanwhile, fellow sprinter Jaleel Croal was the baton bearer during the opening ceremony.

For the third consecutive games, the British Virgin Islands won a single gold medal. This also marked the first time a woman had won a medal for the territory.

== Competitors ==
The following is the list of number of competitors participating at the Games per sport/discipline.

Sport	Men	Women	Total
Athletics	5	6	11
Total	5	6	11

== Medallist ==
The following competitor won a medal at the games. In the by discipline sections below, medallists' names are bolded.

Medal	Name	Sport	Event	Date	Ref.
Gold	Adaejah Hodge	Athletics	Women's 200 metres	31 July	

== Athletics ==
The British Virgin Islands entered 11 athletes (five men and six women).

Key

Ranks given for track events are within the athlete's heat only.

- **Q** = Qualified for the next round
- **q** = Qualified for the next round as a fastest loser or, in field events, by position without achieving the qualifying target

Men
Track events

Athlete	Event	Heat		Semifinal		Final	
Athlete	Event	Result	Rank	Result	Rank	Result	Rank
Rikkoi Brathwaite	100 metres	10.37	2	Did not advance			
Jaleel Croal	100 metres	10.29	2	Did not advance			
Jaleel Croal	200 metres	20.53	1 **q**	20.42	5	Did not advance	
Wanyae Belle	200 metres	20.79	2 **q**	21.13	8	Did not advance	
Adriano Gumbs	200 metres	21.77	5	Did not advance			

Field events

Athlete	Event	Qualification		Final	
Athlete	Event	Distance	Rank	Distance	Rank
Khybah Dawson	Long jump	7.35	14	Did not advance	
Djimon Gumbs	Shot put	18.49	9 **q**	18.45	9

Women
Track events

Athlete	Event	Heat		Semifinal		Final	
Athlete	Event	Result	Rank	Result	Rank	Result	Rank
Beyoncé Defreitas	100 metres	11.33	2 **q**	11.28	3	Did not advance	
Beyoncé Defreitas	200 metres	23.25	1 **q**	23.31	6	Did not advance	
**Adaejah Hodge**	200 metres	Bye		22.01 **GR**	1 **Q**	22.07	1st place, gold medalist(s)
Deya Erickson	100 metres hurdles	13.29	7	—N/a		Did not advance	
Kaelyaah Liburd	400 metres	DNS					

Field events

Athlete	Event	Qualification		Final	
Athlete	Event	Distance	Rank	Distance	Rank
Chantel Malone	Long jump	NM		Did not advance	
Kimberly Smith	Long jump	5.65	20	Did not advance	

== External link ==
- British Virgin Islands at the Glasgow 2026 Commonwealth Games
- British Virgin Islands Olympic Committee Official site
