= Swimming at the 2026 Commonwealth Games – Men's 100 metre freestyle =

Men's 100 metre freestyle at the 2026 Commonwealth Games
- Venue: Tollcross International Swimming Centre
- Dates: 27 July (heats, semifinals); 28 July (final)
- Competitors: 72 from 40 nations
- Winning time: 47.13

Medalists
gold medal	Flynn Southam	Australia
silver medal	Matt Richards	Wales
bronze medal	Kyle Chalmers	Australia

The men's 100 metre freestyle event at the 2026 Commonwealth Games was held on 27 and 28 July at the Tollcross International Swimming Centre.

== Records ==
Prior to this competition, the existing world, Commonwealth and Games records were as follows:

Records before the 2026 Commonwealth Games
Record	Time	Athlete (nation)	Meet	Location	Date	Ref
World record	46.40	Pan Zhanle (CHN)	2024 Olympics	Paris, France	31 July 2024	
Commonwealth record	47.04	Cameron McEvoy (AUS)	2016 Australian Championships	Adelaide, Australia	11 April 2016	
Games record	47.36	Kyle Chalmers (AUS)	2022 Commonwealth Games	Birmingham, England	31 July 2022	

== Schedule ==
The schedule is as follows:

All times are British Summer Time (UTC+1)

Date	Time	Round
Monday 27 July 2026	10:30	Heats
Monday 27 July 2026	19:00	Semifinals
Tuesday 28 July 2026	19:00	Final

== Results ==
=== Heats ===
The heats were held on the morning of 27 July 2026.

Heat results
Rank	Heat	Lane	Swimmer	Nation	Time	Notes
1	8	3	Gabriel Shepherd	England	48.44	Q
2	7	4	Flynn Southam	Australia	48.58	Q
3	8	4	Matt Richards	Wales	48.72	Q
4	8	6	Jacob Whittle	England	48.78	Q
5	9	4	Kyle Chalmers	Australia	49.06	Q
6	9	5	Jacob Mills	England	49.13	Q
7	7	5	Kai Taylor	Australia	49.33	Q
7	9	6	Lamar Taylor	Bahamas	49.33	Q
9	9	2	Carter Swift	New Zealand	49.40	Q
10	9	3	Jack McMillan	Northern Ireland	49.51	Q
11	7	1	Harry Milne	Wales	49.66	Q
12	7	7	Dan Jones	Wales	49.75	Q
13	9	7	Joshua Liendo	Canada	49.79	Q
14	7	6	Mikkel Lee	Singapore	49.82	Q
15	8	2	Guy Brooks	South Africa	49.86	Q
16	9	1	Jensen Norris	Scotland	50.11	Q
17	7	3	Cameron Gray	New Zealand	50.19	R
18	9	8	Stefan Krawiec	Scotland	50.25	R
19	6	3	James Allison	Cayman Islands	50.38	
20	8	8	Abdul Jabar Adama	Nigeria	50.43	
21	8	1	Matthew Hamilton	Northern Ireland	50.46	
22	6	4	Bradley Vincent	Mauritius	50.54	
22	6	6	Marvin Johnson	Bahamas	50.54	
24	6	1	Joel Watterson	Isle of Man	50.66	
25	6	2	L.A.M. Beukes	Namibia	50.69	
26	8	7	David Young	Fiji	50.84	
27	6	7	Colins Obi Ebingha	Nigeria	50.86	
28	5	5	Clinton Opute	Nigeria	51.03	
29	7	8	Arvin Shaun Singh Chahal	Malaysia	51.08	
30	4	4	Harry Robinson	Isle of Man	51.18	
31	6	5	Yin Chuen Lim	Malaysia	51.19	
32	5	4	Daniel Kish	Cayman Islands	51.48	
33	5	1	Tendo Kaumi	Uganda	51.51	
34	5	3	Cleyton Munguambe	Mozambique	51.95	
35	5	7	Ethan Stubbs-Green	Antigua and Barbuda	52.31	
36	4	5	Magnus Kelly	Isle of Man	52.33	
37	5	2	Gregory Anodin	Mauritius	52.36	
38	1	7	Johann Stickland	Samoa	52.46	
39	4	6	Hansel McCaig	Fiji	52.47	
40	1	6	Samiul Islam Rafi	Bangladesh	52.49	
41	5	6	Matthew Deffains	Jersey	52.58	
42	5	8	Tendo Mukalazi	Uganda	52.63	
43	2	8	Muhammad Mohamed Fidhyan	Sri Lanka	53.00	
44	2	6	Muhammad Ahmed Durrani	Pakistan	53.09	
45	4	3	Collins Phillip Saliboko	Tanzania	53.10	
46	4	8	Reuben Taylor	Fiji	53.29	
47	1	3	Hamza Asif	Pakistan	53.43	
48	4	2	Joel Ling	Brunei	53.69	
49	3	3	Henry Bolton	Guernsey	54.20	
50	3	6	Josh Tarere	Papua New Guinea	54.25	
51	3	5	Luka Smit	Malawi	54.39	
52	4	7	Adam Moncherry	Seychelles	54.52	
53	3	4	Finau Ohuafi	Tonga	54.54	
54	2	2	James Sanderson	Gibraltar	54.78	
55	4	1	Amos Ferley	Seychelles	55.04	
56	2	3	Thomas Chen	Papua New Guinea	55.83	
57	1	2	William Caswell	Saint Helena	58.46	
58	3	1	Kean Murenzi Sheja	Rwanda	58.54	
59	3	2	Leo Lebot	Vanuatu	58.68	
60	3	7	Asher Banda	Malawi	1:00.15	
61	2	4	Jayden Ntwali	Rwanda	1:01.09	
62	3	8	Ousman Jobe	The Gambia	1:01.34	
63	2	7	Nolan George	Saint Helena	1:02.85	
64	1	4	Lukas Robbertse	Saint Helena	1:03.83	
65	2	5	Pap D Jonga	The Gambia	1:05.81	
66	1	5	Moses Yongai	Sierra Leone	1:09.96	
67	2	1	Josiah Minott	Anguilla	1:17.57	
	7	2	Antoine Sauve	Canada	-	DSQ
	6	8	Benjamin Winterborn	Canada	DNS	
	8	5	Pieter Coetze	South Africa	DNS	
	7	6	Matthew Hamilton	Northern Ireland	DNS	
	9	7	Kyle Martyn Micallef	Malta	DNS	

=== Semifinals ===
The semifinals took place during of the evening of 27 July 2026.

Semifinals results
Rank	Heat	Lane	Swimmer	Nation	Time	Notes
1	2	3	Kyle Chalmers	Australia	47.87	Q
2	1	4	Flynn Southam	Australia	48.08	Q
3	2	1	Joshua Liendo	Canada	48.20	Q
4	2	5	Matt Richards	Wales	48.21	Q
5	2	4	Gabriel Shepherd	England	48.36	Q
6	1	3	Jacob Mills	England	48.54	Q
7	1	5	Jacob Whittle	England	48.60	Q
8	2	2	Carter Swift	New Zealand	48.77	Q
9	2	6	Lamar Taylor	Bahamas	49.04	R
10	1	6	Kai Taylor	Australia	49.10	R
11	1	2	Jack McMillan	Northern Ireland	49.13	
12	2	8	Guy Brooks	South Africa	49.29	
13	2	7	Harry Milne	Wales	49.45	
14	1	1	Mikkel Lee	Singapore	49.74	
15	1	8	Jensen Norris	Scotland	49.79	
16	1	7	Dan Jones	Wales	49.98	

=== Final ===
The final took place during of the evening of 28 July 2026.

Final results
Rank	Lane	Swimmer	Nation	Time	Notes
1st place, gold medalist(s)	5	Flynn Southam	Australia	47.13	
2nd place, silver medalist(s)	6	Matt Richards	Wales	47.64	
3rd place, bronze medalist(s)	4	Kyle Chalmers	Australia	47.74	
4	3	Joshua Liendo	Canada	48.08	
5	7	Jacob Mills	England	48.31	
6	2	Gabriel Shepherd	England	48.52	
7	1	Jacob Whittle	England	48.76	
8	8	Carter Swift	New Zealand	49.07	
