= Kayla La Grange =

South African sprinter (born 2004)

Personal information
- Born: 17 July 2004 (age 21)

Sport
- Sport: Athletics
- Event: Sprint
Medal record
Women's athletics
Representing South Africa
African U20 Championships
Gold medal – first place	2023 Ndola	4x100m relay

Kayla La Grange (born 17 July 2004) is a South African sprinter. She won the South African championships over 200 metres in 2026.

== Biography ==
La Grange was educated at Laerskool Fontainebleau in Randburg and the University of Johannesburg.

A member of Central Gauteng Athletics, in March 2023 ahead placed second over 100 metres at the South African U20 championships. Later that year, she was part of a South African women’s 4 x 100 metres that won the gold medal at the 2023 African U20 Championships in Ndola, Zambia.

In April 2026, she won the 200 metres title at the South African Championships in Stellenbosch in 23.37 seconds, finishing ahead of Anestayshia George and defending champion Rume Burger. Competing for South Africa at the 2026 World Athletics Relays, she was part of the women's 4 x 100 metres relay team alongside Viwe Jingqi, Gabriella Marais and Joviale Mbisha. The team set a new South African national record on the opening day of 43.22 seconds.
