= Athletics at the 2025 Summer World University Games – Women's 100 metres =

Women's 100 metres at the 2025 Summer World University Games
- Venue: Lohrheidestadion
- Location: Bochum, Germany
- Dates: 21 July (heats); 22 July (semi-finals & final)
- Competitors: 48 from 35 nations
- Winning time: 11.44

Medalists
gold medal	Georgia Harris	Australia
silver medal	Magdalena Stefanowicz	Poland
bronze medal	Gabriella Marais	South Africa

The women's 100 metres event at the 2025 Summer World University Games was held in Bochum, Germany, at Lohrheidestadion on 21 and 22 July.

== Records ==
Prior to the competition, the records were as follows:

Record	Athlete (nation)	Time (s)	Location	Date
Games record	Marlies Göhr (GDR)	11.00	Mexico City, Mexico	8 September 1979

== Results ==
=== Heats ===
First 3 in each heat (Q) and the next 3 fastest (q) qualified for the semi-finals.

==== Heat 1 ====
Place	Athlete	Nation	Time	Notes
1	Diana Honcharenko	Ukraine	11.59	Q
2	Beatriz Andrade	Portugal	11.69	Q
3	Olivia Inkster	Australia	11.73	Q
4	Jennifer Eduwu	Great Britain	11.82	q
5	Maimouna Badji	Senegal	12.07	
6	Bridget Mbwali	Uganda	12.16	
7	Laavinia Jaiganth	Singapore	12.41	
			Wind: (+1.2 m/s)	

==== Heat 2 ====
Place	Athlete	Nation	Time	Notes
1	Georgia Harris	Australia	11.56	Q
2	Yume Okuno	Japan	11.84	Q
3	Rutendo Vushe	Zimbabwe	12.17 [.167]	Q
4	Chan Pui Kei	Hong Kong	12.17 [.169]	
5	Matilda Vitsut	Estonia	12.21	
6	Anna Bognár	Hungary	12.35	
7	Taofikat Sulaimon	Nigeria	12.49	
			Wind: (+0.1 m/s)	

==== Heat 3 ====
Place	Athlete	Nation	Time	Notes
1	Delia Farajpour	Slovakia	11.63	Q
2	Vivian Ogor	Canada	11.76 [.751]	Q
3	Magdalena Lindner	Austria	11.76 [.753]	Q
4	Chloe Pak Hoi-man	Hong Kong	12.05	
5	Nur Afrina Batrisyia	Malaysia	12.32	
6	Sang Lida	Cambodia	12.71	
7	Ala'a Al-Zadjali	Oman	12.87	
			Wind: (−0.7 m/s)	

==== Heat 4 ====
Place	Athlete	Nation	Time	Notes
1	Gabriella Marais	South Africa	11.68	Q
2	Maria Mihalache	Romania	11.76	Q
3	Anaís Hernández	Chile	11.81	Q
4	Jirapat Khanonta	Thailand	11.89	q, SB
5	Georgia Oland	Canada	11.93	
6	Azreen Nabila Alias	Malaysia	12.04	
7	Farida Rzayeva	Azerbaijan	12.70	
			Wind: (−2.1 m/s)	

==== Heat 5 ====
Place	Athlete	Nation	Time	Notes
1	Chloé Galet	France	11.71	Q
2	Abinaya Rajarajan	India	11.88	Q
3	Marielle Venida	New Zealand	11.91	Q
4	Daniela Lasmane	Latvia	12.32	
5	Kristina Jermola	Kazakhstan	12.53	
6	Dana Jiménez Pitre	Colombia	13.02	
7	Vanessa Sena	Brazil	20.45	
			Wind: (−3.2 m/s)	

==== Heat 6 ====
Place	Athlete	Nation	Time	Notes
1	Naomi Riskwait	France	11.62	Q
2	Viktória Strýčková	Slovakia	11.69	Q
3	Joviale Mbisha	South Africa	11.84	Q
4	Maja Emilia Medic	Norway	11.94	
5	Angel Silvia	India	12.03	
6	Charity Mercy Atiang	Uganda	12.30	
7	Elisa Myrtollari	Albania	12.96	
			Wind: (−2.1 m/s)	

==== Heat 7 ====
Place	Athlete	Nation	Time	Notes
1	Magdalena Stefanowicz	Poland	11.63	Q
2	Isabel Posch	Austria	11.72	Q
3	Malin Furuhaug	Norway	11.73	Q
4	Athicha Phetkun	Thailand	11.90	q
5	Belen Ituarte	Chile	12.32	
6	Tanya Hugo Mancilla	Ecuador	13.18	
			Wind: (−1.0 m/s)	

=== Semi-finals ===
First 2 in each heat (Q) and the next 2 fastest (q) qualified for the final.

==== Heat 1 ====
Place	Athlete	Nation	Time	Notes
1	Magdalena Stefanowicz	Poland	11.51	Q
2	Naomi Riskwait	France	11.60	Q
3	Malin Furuhaug	Norway	11.68	q
4	Isabel Posch	Austria	11.72	
5	Olivia Inkster	Australia	11.82	
6	Beatriz Andrade	Portugal	11.84	
7	Jennifer Eduwu	Great Britain	11.99	
8	Rutendo Vushe	Zimbabwe	12.18	
			Wind: (+0.8 m/s)	

==== Heat 2 ====
Place	Athlete	Nation	Time	Notes
1	Georgia Harris	Australia	11.56	Q
2	Chloé Galet	France	11.69	Q
3	Viktória Strýčková	Slovakia	11.73	
4	Maria Mihalache	Romania	11.79	
5	Anaís Hernández	Chile	11.99 [.987]	
6	Yume Okuno	Japan	11.99 [.990]	
7	Athicha Phetkun	Thailand	12.01	
—	Joviale Mbisha	South Africa	DQ	TR 16.8
			Wind: (−0.8 m/s)	

==== Heat 3 ====
Place	Athlete	Nation	Time	Notes
1	Delia Farajpour	Slovakia	11.65	Q
2	Gabriella Marais	South Africa	11.69	Q
3	Vivian Ogor	Canada	11.70	q
4	Abinaya Rajarajan	India	11.73	
5	Diana Honcharenko	Ukraine	11.75	
6	Magdalena Lindner	Austria	11.78	
7	Marielle Venida	New Zealand	11.87	
8	Jirapat Khanonta	Thailand	11.88	SB
			Wind: (−1.4 m/s)	

=== Final ===
Place	Athlete	Nation	Time	Notes
1st place, gold medalist(s)	Georgia Harris	Australia	11.44	
2nd place, silver medalist(s)	Magdalena Stefanowicz	Poland	11.49	
3rd place, bronze medalist(s)	Gabriella Marais	South Africa	11.51	
4	Delia Farajpour	Slovakia	11.57	
5	Chloé Galet	France	11.61 [.608]	
6	Naomi Riskwait	France	11.61 [.610]	
7	Vivian Ogor	Canada	11.65	
8	Malin Furuhaug	Norway	11.82	
			Wind: (−0.7 m/s)	
