= The Gambia at the 2026 Commonwealth Games =

- Flag of Gambia
- CG code: GAM
- CGA: The Gambia National Olympic Committee
- Website: gambianoc.gm

in Glasgow, Scotland 23 July 2026 – 2 August 2026
- Competitors: 12 in 4 sports
- Flag bearer: Ousman Jobe
- Baton bearer: Pap Jonga
- Medals Ranked =36th: Gold 0 Silver 0 Bronze 1 Total 1

Commonwealth Games appearances (overview)
- 1970; 1974; 1978; 1982; 1986; 1990; 1994; 1998; 2002; 2006; 2010; 2014; 2018; 2022; 2026; 2030

The Gambia competed at the 2026 Commonwealth Games in Glasgow, Scotland. This marked The Gambia's 13th participation at the games, after making its debut at the 1970 Commonwealth Games.

The Gambia team competed in four sports: Athletics, judo, swimming and track cycling. The full Gambian team of 12 athletes was announced on 4 July 2026.

Swimmer Ousman Jobe was the country's flagbearer during the opening ceremony. Meanwhile, fellow swimmer Pap Jonga was the baton bearer during the opening ceremony.

== Competitors ==
The following is the list of number of competitors participating at the Games per sport/discipline.

Sport	Men	Women	Total
Athletics	3	4	7
Judo	2	0	2
Swimming	2	0	2
Track cycling	1	0	1
Total	8	4	12

== Medallist ==
The following Gambian competitor a won medal at the games. In the by discipline sections below, medallists' names are bolded.

Medal	Name	Sport	Event	Date	Ref.
Bronze	Faye Njie	Judo	Men's 73 kg	2 August	

== Athletics ==
Gambia entered seven track and field athletes (three men and four women).

Key

Ranks given for track events are within the athlete's heat only.

- **Q** = Qualified for the next round
- **q** = Qualified for the next round as a fastest loser or, in field events, by position without achieving the qualifying target

Men
Track events

Athlete	Event	Heat		Semifinal		Final	
Athlete	Event	Result	Rank	Result	Rank	Result	Rank
Ebrahima Camara	Men's 100 m	10.29	3	Did not advance			
Lamin Camara	Men's 100 m	Did not start					
Alieu Joof	Men's 100 m	10.52	4	Did not advance			
Ebrahima Camara	Men's 200 m	21.60	5	Did not advance			
Lamin Camara	Men's 200 m	DQ		Did not advance			
Alieu Joof	Men's 200 m	21.37	4	Did not advance			

Women
Track events

Athlete	Event	Heat		Semifinal		Final	
Athlete	Event	Result	Rank	Result	Rank	Result	Rank
Gina Bass	Women's 100 m	11.35	2 **q**	11.29	5	Did not advance	
Nyimansata Jawneh	Women's 100 m	11.68	3	Did not advance			
Isatou Sey	Women's 100 m	11.73	3	Did not advance			
Nyimansata Jawneh	Women's 200 m	23.74	3 **q**	23.71	7	Did not advance	
Isatou Sey	Women's 200 m	DQ		Did not advance			
Gina Bass; Nyimansata Jawneh; Sirreh Sanneh; Isatou Sey	Women's 4 × 100 m relay	44.68	4 **q**	—N/a		44.85	8

== Judo ==
Gambia entered two male judoka.

Men

Athlete	Event	Round of 32	Round of 16	Quarterfinals	Semifinals	Repechage	Final/BM	
Athlete	Event	Opposition Result	Opposition Result	Opposition Result	Opposition Result	Opposition Result	Opposition Result	Rank
**Faye Njie**	73 kg	Bye	Sukhamana (SOL); **W** 100–000	Robinson (NZL); **W** 102s1–000	Nairne (ENG); **L** 0s2–011	Bye	Short (SCO); **W** 100s2–000s1	3rd place, bronze medalist(s)
Abdourahman Ceesay	100 kg	—N/a	Mwangushya (UGA); **W** 100–000	Reyes (CAN); **L** 000s3–101s1	Did not advance	Zan (CMR); **L** 000–100	Did not advance	7

== Swimming ==
Gambia entered two male swimmers.

Athlete	Event	Heat		Semifinal		Final	
Athlete	Event	Time	Rank	Time	Rank	Time	Rank
Ousman Jobe	Men's 50 m freestyle	27.52	61	Did not advance			
Ousman Jobe	Men's 100 m freestyle	1:01.34	62	Did not advance			
Ousman Jobe	Men's 50 m butterfly	29.42	64	Did not advance			
Pap Jonga	Men's 50 m freestyle	28.30	63	Did not advance			
Pap Jonga	Men's 100 m freestyle	1:05.81	65	Did not advance			
Pap Jonga	Men's 50 m butterfly	29.62	66	Did not advance			

== Track cycling ==
Gambia entered a single male cyclist into the 2026 Commonwealth Games. Since Gambia lacks a velodrome, its athlete prepared for the games over ten days in the United Kingdom. This would have marked the country's debut in track cycling at the Commonwealth Games. However, Alieu Jammeh did not compete in any events.
