= Athletics at the 2026 Commonwealth Games – Women's 200 metres =

Women's 200 metres at the 2026 Commonwealth Games
- Venue: Scotstoun Stadium, Glasgow
- Dates: 29 July 2026 (round 1); 30 July 2026 (semi-finals); 31 July 2026 (final)
- Competitors: 67 from 35 nations
- Winning time: 22.07

Medalists
gold medal	Adaejah Hodge	British Virgin Islands
silver medal	Shaniqua Bascombe	Trinidad and Tobago
bronze medal	Alana Reid	Jamaica

The women's 200 metres at the 2026 Commonwealth Games, as part of the athletics programme, will take place at the Scotstoun Stadium from 29 to 31 July 2026.

== Records ==
Prior to this competition, the existing world and Games records were as follows:

Women's 200 Metres
World record	21.34	Florence Griffith Joyner (USA)	Seoul, Korea	29 Sep 1988
Commonwealth record	21.41	Shericka Jackson (JAM)	Budapest, Hungary	25 Aug 2023
Games record	22.02	Elaine Thompson-Herah (JAM)	Birmingham, England	6 August 2022

== Schedule ==
The schedule is as follows:

Date	Time	Round
29 July 2026	10:00	Round 1
30 July 2026	18:30	Semi-finals
31 July 2026	18:30	Final

All times are United Kingdom time (UTC+1)

== Results ==
=== Round 1 ===
Round 1 took place on the morning of 29 July 2026. 17 best performers (q) advance to the semi-finals.

==== Heat 1 ====
Place	Lane	Athlete	Nation	Time	Notes
1	8	Beyoncé Defreitas	British Virgin Islands	23.25	q
2	2	Alyson Bell	Scotland	23.38	q, SB
3	3	Reese Webster	Trinidad and Tobago	24.09	
4	6	Abigail Pawlett	Wales	24.60	SB
5	4	Ziva Moosa Shafeeu	Maldives	24.67	NR
6	5	Natasha Chetty	Seychelles	24.96	
—	7	Isatou Sey	The Gambia	DQ	TR17.2.3
				Wind: (+1.7 m/s)	

==== Heat 2 ====
Place	Lane	Athlete	Nation	Time	Notes
1	6	Mia Gross	Australia	23.21	q
2	1	Milcent Ndoro	Kenya	23.45	q
3	2	Mamakoli Senaouane	Lesotho	24.04	
4	5	Amani Kirnon	Montserrat	24.13	
5	8	Amanda Khondowe	Malawi	25.07	PB
6	4	Isila Apkup	Papua New Guinea	25.16	
7	3	Nyasha Harris	Belize	25.88	
—	7	Elma Sesay	Sierra Leone	DQ	TR17.2.3
				Wind: (+1.5 m/s)	

==== Heat 3 ====
Place	Lane	Athlete	Nation	Time	Notes
1	2	Monique Hanlon	Australia	23.12	q
2	7	Olivia Fotopoulou	Cyprus	23.62	q
3	8	Winfrida Makenji	Tanzania	23.88	q, NR
—	3	Vaioleta Luka	Tuvalu	DQ	TR17.2.3
—	6	Edna Ng'Andula	Zambia	DQ	TR17.2.3
—	4	Geolyna Dowdye	Antigua and Barbuda	DNS	
—	5	Malia Nalane	Lesotho	DNS	
				Wind: (+1.6 m/s)	

==== Heat 4 ====
Place	Lane	Athlete	Nation	Time	Notes
1	3	Obi Chukwuka	Nigeria	23.26	q, PB
2	8	Marie-Éloïse Leclair	Canada	23.50	q
3	5	Nyimansata Jawneh	The Gambia	23.74	q
4	2	Claire Azzopardi	Malta	24.16	
5	4	Bongiwe Mahlalela	Eswatini	24.19	SB
6	1	Ahnaa Nizaar	Maldives	24.75	PB
—	7	Anita Afrifa	Ghana	DNF	
—	6	Marie Bangura	Sierra Leone	DQ	TR17.2.3
				Wind: (+1.4 m/s)	

==== Heat 5 ====
Place	Lane	Athlete	Nation	Time	Notes
1	4	Lavanya Williams	Jamaica	22.91	q
2	2	Veronica Shanti Pereira	Singapore	23.00	q, SB
3	5	Olayinka Olajide	Nigeria	23.62	q
4	6	Magnifique Umutesiwase	Rwanda	23.95	NR
5	7	Abi Galpin	Guernsey	24.45	
6	3	Aminath Layaana	Maldives	25.85	PB
				Wind: (+0.8 m/s)	

==== Heat 6 ====
Place	Lane	Athlete	Nation	Time	Notes
1	7	Alana Reid	Jamaica	22.95	q
2	5	Frédérique Chiasson	Canada	23.15	q
3	3	Anthonique Strachan	Bahamas	23.52	q, SB
4	4	Asimenye Simwaka	Malawi	23.60	q, SB
5	2	Kelia Bentham	Barbados	23.96	
6	8	Heleina Young	Fiji	24.45	=SB
7	6	Chloe David	Vanuatu	25.99	PB
				Wind: (+1.7 m/s)	

=== Semi-finals ===
The semi-finals took place on the evening of 30 July 2026. First 2 in each heat (Q) and the next 2 fastest (q) advance to the final.

==== Heat 1 ====
Place	Lane	Athlete	Nation	Time	Notes
1	7	Torrie Lewis	Australia	22.64 [.632]	Q
2	5	Alana Reid	Jamaica	22.64 [.635]	Q
3	6	Success Eduan	England	22.65	q
4	4	Frédérique Chiasson	Canada	22.98	
5	1	Obi Chukwuka	Nigeria	23.25	
6	3	Beyoncé Defreitas	British Virgin Islands	23.31	
7	8	Milcent Ndoro	Kenya	23.37	
8	2	Asimenye Simwaka	Malawi	23.71	
				Wind: (+4.7 m/s)	

==== Heat 2 ====
Place	Lane	Athlete	Nation	Time	Notes
1	6	Adaejah Hodge	British Virgin Islands	22.01	Q, GR
2	7	Ashanti Moore	Jamaica	22.49	Q
3	8	Veronica Shanti Pereira	Singapore	22.81	q, SB
4	5	Monique Hanlon	Australia	22.90	
5	4	Marie-Éloïse Leclair	Canada	23.28	
6	2	Alyson Bell	Scotland	23.42	
7	3	Olayinka Olajide	Nigeria	23.79	
8	1	Winfrida Makenji	Tanzania	23.99	
				Wind: (+1.7 m/s)	

==== Heat 3 ====
Place	Lane	Athlete	Nation	Time	Notes
1	5	Shaniqua Bascombe	Trinidad and Tobago	22.31	Q, PB
2	6	Lavanya Williams	Jamaica	22.71	Q
3	7	Audrey Leduc	Canada	22.98	
4	8	Mia Gross	Australia	23.12	
5	1	Anthonique Strachan	Bahamas	23.66	
6	3	Keliza Smith	Guyana	23.69	
7	2	Nyimansata Jawneh	The Gambia	23.71	
8	4	Olivia Fotopoulou	Cyprus	24.20	
				Wind: (+1.5 m/s)	

=== Final ===
The final takes place on the evening of 31 July 2026.

Place	Lane	Athlete	Nation	Time	Notes
1st place, gold medalist(s)	6	Adaejah Hodge	British Virgin Islands	22.07	
2nd place, silver medalist(s)	5	Shaniqua Bascombe	Trinidad and Tobago	22.35	
3rd place, bronze medalist(s)	4	Alana Reid	Jamaica	22.56	
4	8	Ashanti Moore	Jamaica	22.57	
5	3	Lavanya Williams	Jamaica	22.62	
6	7	Torrie Lewis	Australia	22.88	
7	2	Success Eduan	England	23.04	
8	1	Veronica Shanti Pereira	Singapore	23.21	
				Wind: (+1.7 m/s)	
