= Georgia Harris (sprinter) =

Australian sprinter (born 2004)

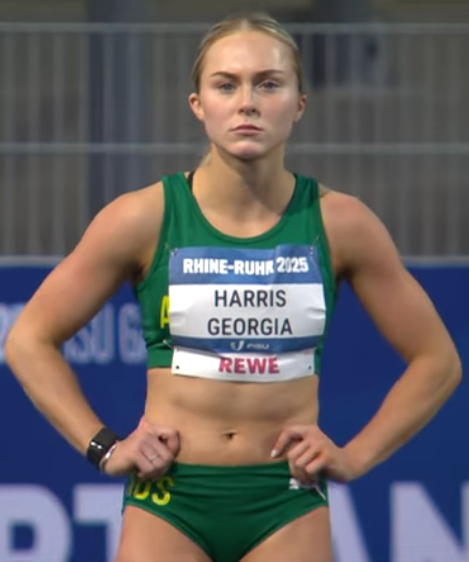
- At the 2025 Summer World University Games

Personal information
- Born: 10 June 2004 (age 22)

Sport
- Sport: Athletics
- Event: Sprint
Medal record
Women's athletics
Representing AUS
Oceania Championships
Bronze medal – third place	2026 Darwin	100 m
Pacific Games
Gold medal – first place	2023 Honiara	100 metres
Summer World University Games
Gold medal – first place	2025 Bochum	100 m
Gold medal – first place	2025 Bochum	4x100m relay

Georgia Harris (born 10 June 2004) is an Australian sprinter. She won the gold medal in the 100 metres at the 2023 Pacific Games and the 2025 Summer World University Games.

== Biography ==
Harris competed for Australia at the 2022 World Athletics U20 Championships in Cali, Colombia in both the 200 metres and the women's 4 x 100 metres relay, in which the Australian team placed sixth overall in the final. In April 2023, she lowered her personal best to 11.46 seconds in winning the Australian U20 Championships 100m race. She was also second in the 200m in 23.61.

In November 2023, she won the gold medal in the 100 metres at the 2023 Pacific Games in Honiara a time of 11.70 seconds, having also topped the qualifying lists in both the heats and semi-final.

Harris was selected for the Australian relay pool for the 2025 World Athletics Relays in China in May 2025. In the first round of the 4 × 100 m relay she ran alongside Bree Masters, Kristie Edwards and Thewbelle Philp as they finished third in their heat with a time of 43.15, narrowly missing automatic qualification by 0.02 seconds. She was selected for the 2025 Summer World University Games in Bochum, winning the gold medal in the 100 metres and the women's 4 x 100 metres relay. She was selected for the Australian team for the 2025 World Athletics Championships in Tokyo, Japan.

Harris ran 11.50 seconds (-0.4) to win the Australian national 100 metres title for the first time on 11 April 2026, winning ahead of Chloe Mannix-Power and Ebony Lane. She ran in the women’s 4 x 100 metres relay team at the 2026 World Athletics Relays in Botswana, and ran the anchor leg alongside Lane, Torrie Lewis and Monique Hanlon, as Australia secured qualification for the 2027 World Championships. Later that month, Harris won the bronze medal behind Zoe Hobbs and Ebony Lane in the 100 metres at the 2026 Oceania Athletics Championships in Darwin. She competed in the 100 metres at the 2026 Commonwealth Games in Glasgow, Scotland, reaching the semi-finals.
