= Torrie Lewis =

Australian athlete (born 2005)

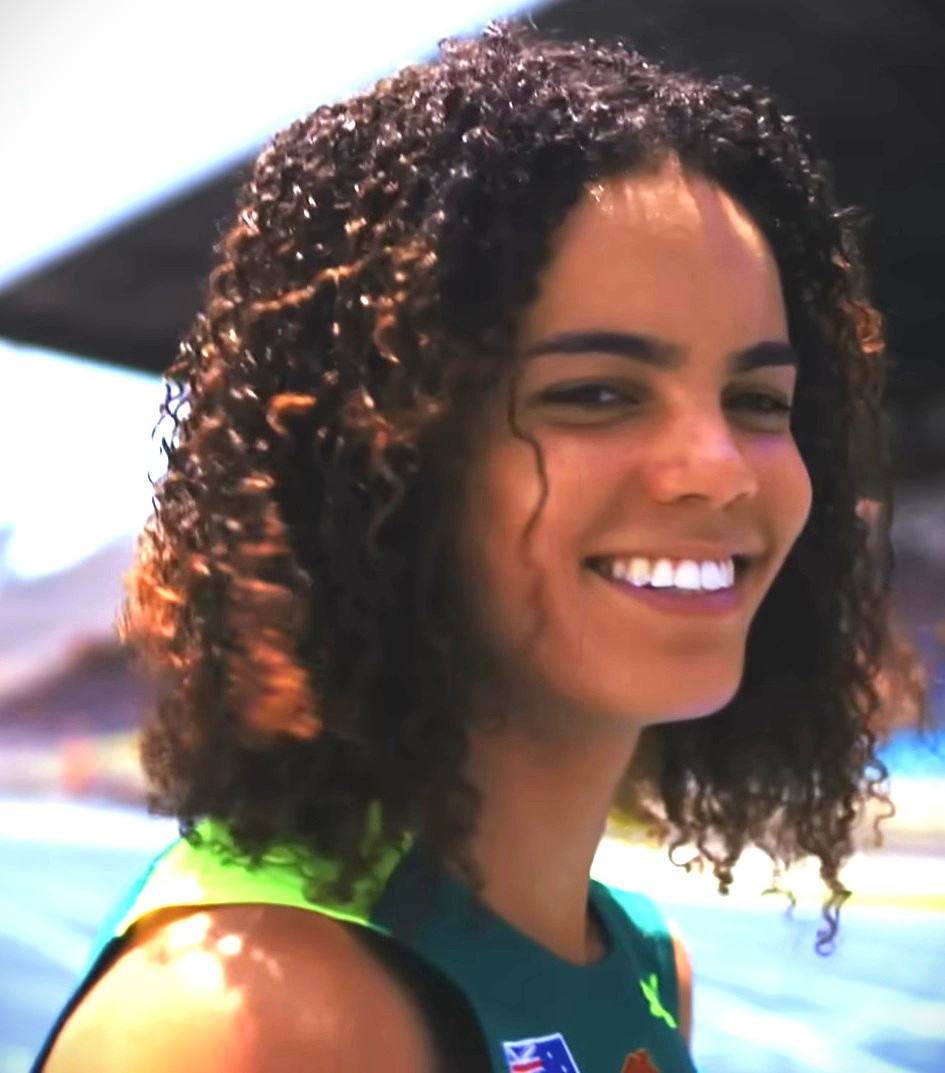
- Lewis in 2024

Personal information
- Nationality: Australian
- Born: 8 January 2005 (age 21) Nottingham, England
- Height: 1.75 m (5 ft 9 in)

Sport
- Sport: Track and Field
- Event: Sprint

Achievements and titles
- Personal bests: 60m: 7.14 (2025) NR; 100m: 10.99 (2026) NR; 200m: 22.56 (2025); 200mi: 22.65 (2025)
Medal record
Women's athletics
Representing Australia
Commonwealth Games
Bronze medal – third place	2026 Glasgow	100 m
Oceania Championships
Gold medal – first place	2024 Suva	200 m
World U20 Championships
Gold medal – first place	2024 Lima	200 m

Torrie Lewis (born 8 January 2005) is an Australian sprinter. She is the Australian national record holder over 60 metres and 100 metres. She has won Australian national titles over 100 metres and 200 metres and ran 10.99 seconds to win the 100 m bronze medal at the 2026 Commonwealth Games.

== Early life ==
Lewis was born in Nottingham, England, to a father of Jamaican and Indian descent and a mother of Scottish descent. At the age of six she moved to Australia and was a promising gymnast in her early years in Newcastle, New South Wales, before turning her full attention to the track. She later moved to Brisbane, Queensland where she attended St Peters Lutheran College.

== Career ==
Lewis ran 11.33 seconds for the 100m aged 16 years-old which placed her as the third fastest U18 women in the world, behind only Tina Clayton of Jamaica and American Shawnti Jackson.

In April 2023, aged 18 years, she won the 100m and 200m sprint double at the Australian national athletics championships.

=== 2024 ===
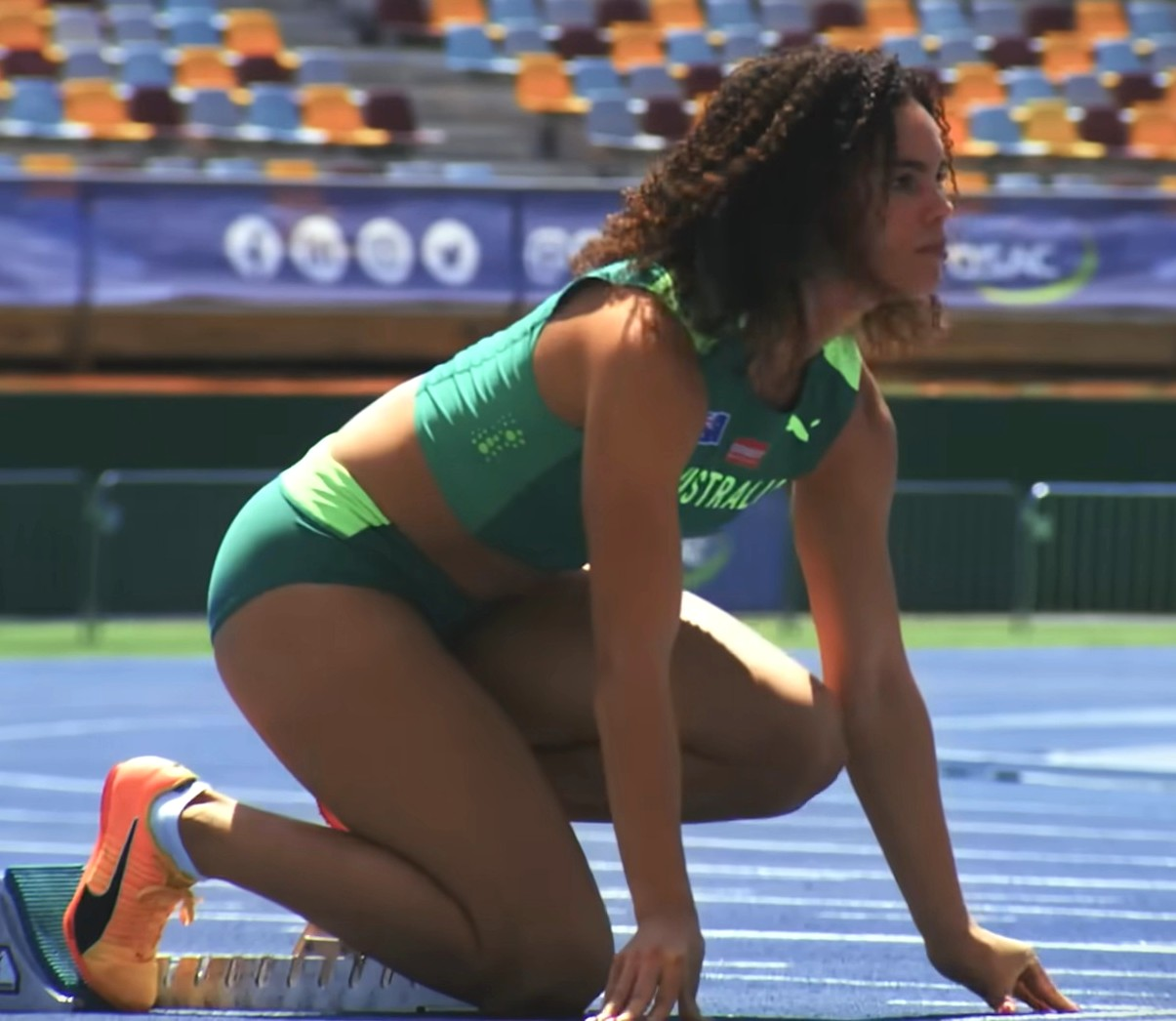
Lewis in 2024

On 27 January 2024, Lewis ran 11.10 (+1.6) in Canberra to become both (i) the Australian under-20 women's 100 metres record holder, surpassing Raelene Boyle's longstanding under-20 record of 11.20 set at altitude at the 1968 Olympic Games in Mexico, and (ii) the Australian Women's open 100 metres record holder, passing Melissa Breen's previous mark of 11.11 set in 2014, also in Canberra.

In April 2024, Lewis lowered her personal best for the 200 metres to 22.94 seconds in a heat at the Australian National championships in Adelaide where she went on to win gold ahead of Mia Gross. She did not defend her 100m national title to focus on the 200m ahead of the Olympics. Lewis made her Diamond League debut in the 200m at the first meet of 2024 in Xiamen, China, with a spectacular, unexpected win from lane 9 over Sha'carri Richardson and other outstanding athletes. She ran as part of the Australian 4x100m relay team at the 2024 World Relays Championships in Nassau, Bahamas.

Lewis represented Australia in the 2024 Summer Olympics in Paris in the 200m, achieving a then PB of 22.89 in the heats and reaching the semi-finals., and she also competed in the 4 × 100 m relay at the Games. She was second across the line in the 200 metres at the 2024 World Athletics U20 Championships in Lima, Peru in August 2024, running a personal best 22.88 seconds but was later promoted to the gold medal after the race winner failed a drug test.

Lewis, along with Ebony Lane, Bree Masters, Kristie Edwards and Ella Connolly, was part of an Australian 4 × 100 m relay team that broke the Oceania and thus national records three times in 2024, starting with a time of 42.94 seconds at the Sydney Track Classic in March 2024; then 42.83 in early May in the heats of the 2024 World Relay Championships at the Thomas Robinson Stadium, Nassau, Bahamas; then, finally, at the London Diamond Leagues Athletics Meet where they ran 42.48 seconds.

=== 2025 ===
Lewis opened her 2025 season on 29 January running 7.14s in the 60 metres final in the Belgrade Indoor Meeting to set a new Australian record for the event (indoor and outdoor). At her next indoor meet she ran 22.65 s to win her first short track 200m race, 0.01 s off Melinda Gainsford-Taylor's Australian and Oceanian area short track record (set when MGT won the Women's 200 metres at the 1995 IAAF World Indoor Championships). She was selected for the 60 metres and 4x400 relay at the 2025 World Athletics Indoor Championships in Nanjing in March 2025. She only competed in the 60m, making the semi-final stage.

She won the 100 metres title at the Australian Athletics Championships on 12 April 2025, running 11.24 seconds to beat teenager Leah O'Brien and Bree Rizzo on the line in a three-way photo finish.

On 13 September, Lewis broke her own national 100 metres record, running 11.08 seconds in the heats at the 2025 World Athletics Championships in Tokyo, Japan, to qualify for the semi-finals. Later at the championships, she was a semi-finalist in the women's 200 metres in Tokyo, running a personal best 22.56 seconds. She also ran in the women's 4 x 100 metres relay at the championships.

=== 2026 ===
Lewis ran for Australia in the women's 4 x 100 metres relay at the 2026 World Athletics Relays in Gaborone, Botswana, in May 2026. On the second day the quartet of Lewis, Ebony Lane, Monique Hanlon and Georgia Harris won their heat to successfully qualify for the 2027 World Championships. Later that month, Lewis had top-six finishes in both the 100 metres and 200 metres in the 2026 Diamond League meeting in Rabat.

In July 2026, Lewis ran a new personal best and Australian record for the 100 metres three times in a week. She ran 11.04 seconds on 21 July in Slovakia, winning ahead of Elaine Thompson-Herah, and also won the 200 m at the meet in Banská Bystrica in 22.66 seconds. Competing at the 2026 Commonwealth Games in Glasgow, Scotland, on 28 July, Lewis ran 11.00 seconds in the semi-final before winning the bronze medal in the final later that day with a time of 10.99 seconds. She was also a finalist in the 200 metres at the women's 200 metres at the Games, placing sixth overall. Later at the Games, she also competed in the women's 4 × 100 m relay.

== Personal life ==
Lewis has coeliac disease.

== Athletics achievements ==
Information from her World Athletics profile unless otherwise noted.

=== Personal bests ===
Type	Distance	Time (s)	Wind (m/s)	Venue	Date	Notes
Individual events
Indoor	50 metres	6.24	—N/a	Ostrava, Czech Republic	4 February 2025	AR NR
Indoor	60 metres	7.14	—N/a	Belgrade, Serbia	29 January 2025	NR
Indoor	200 metres sh	22.65	—N/a	Metz, France	8 February 2025	
Outdoor	100 metres	10.99	+1.0	Glasgow, United Kingdom	28 July 2026	NR
Outdoor	200 metres	22.56	+0.0	Tokyo, Japan	17 September 2025	
Outdoor	400 metres	53.32	—N/a	Brisbane, Australia	14 January 2023	
Team events
Outdoor	4 × 100 metres relay	42.48	—N/a	London, United Kingdom	20 July 2024	AR NR
Outdoor	Mixed 4 × 100 metres relay	41.09	—N/a	Paris, France	28 June 2026	
Outdoor	Mixed 4 × 400 metres relay	3:19.66	—N/a	Gold Coast, Australia	7 May 2023	

=== International competitions ===
Representing Australia
Year	Competition	Venue	Position	Event	Time	Notes
2023	World Championships	Budapest, Hungary	39th (h)	100 m	11.45	
2023	World Championships	Budapest, Hungary	—	4 x 100 m relay	DNF	
2024	World Relays	Nassau, The Bahamas	5th	4 x 100 m relay	43.02	
2024	Oceania Championships	Suva, Fiji	1st	200 m	23.14	CR
2024	Olympic Games	Paris, France	22nd (sf)	200 m	22.92	
2024	Olympic Games	Paris, France	10th (sf)	4 x 100 m relay	42.75	
2024	World U20 Championships	Lima, Peru	1st	200 m	22.88	PB
2024	World U20 Championships	Lima, Peru	—	4 x 100 m relay	DQ	TR24.7[L]
2025	World Indoor Championships	Nanjing, China	12th (sf)	60 m		
2025	World Championships	Tokyo, Japan	14th (sf)	100 m	11.14	
2025	World Championships	Tokyo, Japan	12th (sf)	200 m	22.69	
2025	World Championships	Tokyo, Japan	—	4 x 100 m relay	DNF	
2026	World Relays	Gaborone, Botswana	—	4 x 100 m relay	DQ	TR24.7
2026	Commonwealth Games	Glasgow, United Kingdom	3rd	100 m	10.99	NR
2026	Commonwealth Games	Glasgow, United Kingdom	6th	200 m	22.88	
2026	Commonwealth Games	Glasgow, United Kingdom	4th	4 x 100 m relay	43.09	
