= 2026 European Judo Championships – Men's 73 kg =

Judo competition

Judo Men's 73 kg at the 2026 European Judo Championships
- Venue: Olympic Palace
- Location: Tbilisi, Georgia
- Date: 17 April 2026
- Competitors: 41 from 28 nations

Medalists
gold medal	Lasha Shavdatuashvili (1st title)	Georgia
silver medal	Hidayat Heydarov	Azerbaijan
bronze medal	Bilal Çiloğlu	Turkey
bronze medal	Dayyan Boulemtafes	France

Competition at external databases
- Links: IJF • JudoInside

The men's 73 kg event at the 2026 European Judo Championships was held at the Olympic Palace in Tbilisi, Georgia on 17 April 2026.

== Results ==
=== Finals ===
Semi-finals
(France) Joan-Benjamin Gaba	000
(Georgia (country)) Lasha Shavdatuashvili	100 (yellow card)
(Azerbaijan) Hidayat Heydarov	002 (yellow card)
(Turkey) Bilal Çiloğlu	001

Final
(Georgia (country)) Lasha Shavdatuashvili	100 (yellow card)
(Azerbaijan) Hidayat Heydarov	000

=== Repechage ===
Repechage
(Moldova) Adil Osmanov	000 (yellow card)
(Kosovo) Akil Gjakova	020 (yellow card)
(France) Dayyan Boulemtafes	020 (yellow card)
(United Kingdom) Ethan Nairne	010 (yellow card)

Bronze medal
(Kosovo) Akil Gjakova	000
(Turkey) Bilal Çiloğlu	010 (yellow card)
(France) Dayyan Boulemtafes	001
(France) Joan-Benjamin Gaba	000

=== Pool A ===
First round
(Bulgaria) Mark Hristov	000
(Slovenia) Urh Ogrizek	001
(Hungary) Áron Szabó	001 (yellow card)
(Denmark) Morgan Errboe	000

Round of 32
(France) Joan-Benjamin Gaba	100
(Armenia) Artak Torosyan	000
(Slovenia) Urh Ogrizek	000
(Ukraine) Said-Magomed Khalidov	111 (yellow card)
(Spain) Anton Shuhalieiev	020
(Turkey) Muhammed Demirel	000
(Hungary) Áron Szabó	000
(Moldova) Adil Osmanov	010 (yellow card)

Round of 16
(France) Joan-Benjamin Gaba	001 (yellow card)
(Ukraine) Said-Magomed Khalidov	000 (yellow card)
(Spain) Anton Shuhalieiev	000
(Moldova) Adil Osmanov	100

Quarter-finals
(France) Joan-Benjamin Gaba	001 (yellow card)
(Moldova) Adil Osmanov	000

=== Pool B ===
First round
(Finland) Valtteri Olin	100 (yellow card)
(Cyprus) Kyprianos Andreou	000
(Austria) Samuel Gaßner	100
(Italy) Fabio Basile	000

Round of 32
(Georgia (country)) Lasha Shavdatuashvili	100
(Finland) Valtteri Olin	000
(Romania) Lucian Borş-Dumitrescu	001
(Germany) Kevin Abeltshauser	000 (yellow card)
(Kosovo) Akil Gjakova	100
(Austria) Samuel Gaßner	010
(United Kingdom) Benjamin Levy	010
(Greece) Nikolaos Gkinis	000 (yellow card)

Round of 16
(Georgia (country)) Lasha Shavdatuashvili	w/o
(Romania) Lucian Borş-Dumitrescu
(Kosovo) Akil Gjakova	100 (yellow card)
(United Kingdom) Benjamin Levy	000 (yellow card)

Quarter-finals
(Georgia (country)) Lasha Shavdatuashvili	100
(Kosovo) Akil Gjakova	000

=== Pool C ===
First round
(Romania) Ioan Dzițac	010
(Bulgaria) Victor Skerlev	020
(Israel) Yehonatan Elbaz	002
(Moldova) Vlad Mitru	021 (yellow card)
(France) Dayyan Boulemtafes	100
(Croatia) Robert Klačar	000

Round of 32
(Azerbaijan) Hidayat Heydarov	110
(Greece) Konstantinos Tsaparas	000
(Bulgaria) Victor Skerlev	000
(Kosovo) Dardan Cena	100 (yellow card)
(Portugal) Otari Kvantidze	101
(Moldova) Vlad Mitru	000 (yellow card)
(France) Dayyan Boulemtafes	100
(Estonia) Matheas Trilljärv	000

Round of 16
(Azerbaijan) Hidayat Heydarov	001 (yellow card)
(Kosovo) Dardan Cena	000
(Portugal) Otari Kvantidze	000 (yellow card)
(France) Dayyan Boulemtafes	020

Quarter-finals
(Azerbaijan) Hidayat Heydarov	100 (yellow card)
(France) Dayyan Boulemtafes	000 (yellow card)

=== Pool D ===
First round
(Slovenia) Martin Hojak	000 (yellow card)
(Germany) Jano Rübo	001
(Georgia (country)) Mikheili Bakhbakhashvili	000
(Hungary) Dániel Szegedi	012 (yellow card)

Round of 32
(Italy) Leonardo Valeriani	000
(Germany) Jano Rübo	001 (yellow card)
(United Kingdom) Ethan Nairne	001 (yellow card)
(Republic of Ireland) Joshua Green	000
(Czech Republic) Chusniddin Karimov	000
(Georgia (country)) Mikheili Bakhbakhashvili	012 (yellow card)
(Belarus) Arseni Hladkikh	000
(Turkey) Bilal Çiloğlu	001

Round of 16
(Germany) Jano Rübo	000 (yellow card)
(United Kingdom) Ethan Nairne	100
(Georgia (country)) Mikheili Bakhbakhashvili	000 (yellow card)
(Turkey) Bilal Çiloğlu	001

Quarter-finals
(United Kingdom) Ethan Nairne	000
(Turkey) Bilal Çiloğlu	001 (yellow card)
