= Guyana at the Commonwealth Games =

- CGF code: GUY
- CGA: Guyana Olympic Association
- Medals Ranked 28th: Gold 4 Silver 6 Bronze 6 Total 16

Commonwealth Games appearances (overview)
- 1930; 1934; 1938; 1950; 1954; 1958; 1962; 1966; 1970; 1974; 1978; 1982; 1986; 1990; 1994; 1998; 2002; 2006; 2010; 2014; 2018; 2022; 2026; 2030

Guyana has competed in seventeen of the twenty previous Commonwealth Games. British Guiana was one of the eleven countries to compete in the first Games in 1930, and participated under that name until 1962. The country gained independence in 1966 as Guyana, and subsequently competed under that name.

== Overall medal tally ==
At the 1930 British Empire Games, British Guiana won two medals. A silver medal was won by Colin Gordon in the high jump and a bronze medal was won in the coxed four event in rowing. In the 1934 British Empire Games, a gold medal was won by Phil Edwards in the 880 yards. Edwards competed for Canada at several Olympic Games.

	(gold)	(silver)	(bronze)	Total
Guyana	3	6	6	15

Games	Gold	Silver	Bronze	Total
1930 Hamilton	0	1	1	2
1934 London	1	0	0	1
1938 Sydney	0	1	0	1
1954 Vancouver	0	0	1	1
1958 Cardiff	0	1	0	1
1962 Perth	0	0	1	1
1966 Kingston	0	1	0	1
1970 Edinburgh	0	0	1	1
1978 Edmonton	1	1	1	3
1982 Brisbane	0	0	0	0
1990 Auckland	0	0	1	1
1994 Victoria	0	0	0	0
1998 Kuala Lumpur	0	0	0	0
2002 Manchester	1	0	0	1
2006 Melbourne	0	0	0	0
2010 Delhi	0	1	0	1
2014 Glasgow	0	0	0	0
2018 Gold Coast	1	0	0	1
Totals (18 entries)	4	6	6	16

== See also ==
- All-time medal tally of Commonwealth Games
