= Guyana at the 2026 Commonwealth Games =

- Flag of Guyana
- CG code: GUY
- CGA: Guyana Olympic Association

in Glasgow, Scotland 23 July 2026 – 2 August 2026
- Competitors: 16 in 3 sports
- Flag bearer: Travis Belgrave
- Baton bearer: Aaliyah Moore
- Medals: Gold 0 Silver 0 Bronze 0 Total 0

Commonwealth Games appearances (overview)
- 1930; 1934; 1938; 1950; 1954; 1958; 1962; 1966; 1970; 1974; 1978; 1982; 1986; 1990; 1994; 1998; 2002; 2006; 2010; 2014; 2018; 2022; 2026; 2030

Guyana competed at the 2026 Commonwealth Games in Glasgow, Scotland. This marked Guyana's 20th appearance at the Commonwealth Games, having made its debut at the inaugural games in 1930.

The King's Baton relay stopped in Guyana in April 2026. The Guyanese team was scheduled to compete in four sports. However, the final team consisted of 16 athletes (13 men and three women) competing in three sports. Basketball player Travis Belgrave was the country's flagbearer during the opening ceremony. Meanwhile, athlete Aaliyah Moore was the baton bearer during the opening ceremony.

== Competitors ==
The following is the list of number of competitors participating at the Games per sport/discipline.

Sport	Men	Women	Total
3x3 basketball	4	0	4
Athletics	7	2	9
Swimming	2	1	3
Total	13	3	16

== 3x3 basketball ==
Guyana qualified a men's 3x3 basketball team. This marked the country's debut in the sport at the Commonwealth Games. The team consisted of four athletes.

Summary

Team	Event	Group stage						Quarterfinal	Semifinal	Final / BM / CM	
Team	Event	Opposition Score	Opposition Score	Opposition Score	Opposition Score	Opposition Score	Rank	Opposition Score	Opposition Score	Opposition Score	Rank
Guyana	Men's	Scotland; L 14–21	New Zealand; L 3–21	Cayman Islands; W 21–17	Australia; L 11–21	Nigeria; L 19–20	5	Did not advance			9

=== Men's tournament ===
Roster
The roster was officially confirmed on July 14, 2026.

- Anish Ramlall
- Travis Belgrave
- Christian Hinckson
- Kevin Mickle

Group A

Pos	Team	Pld	W	L	PF	PA	PD	Qualification
1	Australia	5	5	0	105	60	+45	Direct to semi-finals
2	New Zealand	5	4	1	99	56	+43	Quarter-finals
3	Scotland (H)	5	3	2	90	85	+5	Quarter-finals
4	Nigeria	5	2	3	82	99	−17	
5	Guyana	5	1	4	68	100	−32	
6	Cayman Islands	5	0	5	61	105	−44	

Source: Glasgow 2026
Rules for classification: 1) Wins; 2) Head-to-head record; 3) Points scored.
(H) Hosts

24 July 2026
12:30

Report

Scotland	21–14	Guyana
Pts: White 8		Pts: Hinckson 6

SEC, Glasgow

24 July 2026
14:55

Report

New Zealand	21–3	Guyana
Pts: Book 10		Pts: Hinckson 2

SEC, Glasgow

24 July 2026
19:50

Report

Cayman Islands	17–21	Guyana
Pts: Hurlston-Anderson 11		Pts: Ramlall 9

SEC, Glasgow

26 July 2026
14:50

Report

Australia	21–11	Guyana
Pts: Antonio 8		Pts: Hinckson 5

SEC, Glasgow

26 July 2026
18:40

Report

Nigeria	20–19	Guyana
Pts: Okundayo 9		Pts: Ramlall 10

SEC, Glasgow

== Athletics ==
Guyana named nine track and field athletes to the team, seven men and two women.

Key

Ranks given for track events are within the athlete's heat only.

- Q = Qualified for the next round
- q = Qualified for the next round as a fastest loser or, in field events, by position without achieving the qualifying target

Track events
Men

Athlete	Event	Heat		Semifinal		Final	
Athlete	Event	Result	Rank	Result	Rank	Result	Rank
Noelex Holder	100 m	10.65	4	Did not advance			
Shamar Horatio	100 m	10.43	3	Did not advance			
Akeem Stewart	100 m	10.55	3	Did not advance			
Jackson Clarke	200 m	20.80	2	Did not advance			
Noelex Holder	200 m	21.90 SB	5	Did not advance			
Shamar Horatio	200 m	20.83	2	Did not advance			
Simeon Adams	400 m	47.35 SB	5	Did not advance			
Revon Williams	400 m	48.25	6	Did not advance			
Akeem Stewart; Jackson Clarke; Noelex Holder; Shamar Horatio	4 × 100 m relay	39.96 SB	5	—N/a		Did not advance	

Field event

Athlete	Event	Qualification		Final	
Athlete	Event	Distance	Rank	Distance	Rank
Stafon Roach	Triple jump	15.45	11 q	15.64	10

Women
Track events

Athlete	Event	Heat		Semifinal		Final	
Athlete	Event	Result	Rank	Result	Rank	Result	Rank
Keliza Smith	100 m	11.55 SB	4	Did not advance			
Keliza Smith	200 m	23.69	6	Did not advance			
Aaliyah Moore	800 m	2:05.54	6	Did not advance			

== Swimming ==
Guyana entered three swimmers (two men and one woman).

Athlete	Event	Heat		Semifinal		Final	
Athlete	Event	Time	Rank	Time	Rank	Time	Rank
Chase Thompson	Men's 50 m breaststroke	32.78	50	Did not advance			
Chase Thompson	Men's 100 m breaststroke	1:15.06	42	Did not advance			
Chase Thompson	Men's 50 m butterfly	30.35	67	Did not advance			
Delroy Tyrrell	Men's 50 m freestyle	24.98	52	Did not advance			
Delroy Tyrrell	Men's 50 m backstroke	27.61	24	Did not advance			
Delroy Tyrrell	Men's 50 m butterfly	26.00	=44	Did not advance			
Aleka Persaud	Women's 50 m freestyle	28.13	48	Did not advance			
Aleka Persaud	Women's 100 m freestyle	DNS					
Aleka Persaud	Women's 50 m butterfly	29.24	38	Did not advance			
Aleka Persaud	Women's 100 m butterfly	1:08.39	27	Did not advance			

== Non-competing sports ==
=== Boxing ===
Guyana entered four boxers (three men and one woman). However, none of the boxers were permitted to compete because the results of their gender tests did not arrive on time. Keevin Allicock, Shakquain James, Emmanuel Pompey and Akeelah Vancooten were scheduled to participate.
