= Gabriella Marais =

South African sprinter (born 2003)

Personal information
- Born: 18 November 2003 (age 22)

Sport
- Sport: Athletics
- Event: Sprint

Achievements and titles
- Personal best(s): 100m: 11.48 (2025); 200m: 23.57 (2025)
Medal record
Women's athletics
Representing RSA
Summer World University Games
Bronze medal – third place	2025 Bochum	100 m

Gabriella Marais (born 18 November 2003) is a South African sprinter.

== Biography ==
Marais placed second over 100 metres at the 2025 South African Athletics Championships in April 2025, running 11.55 seconds in Potchefstroom to finish behind Joviale Mbisha. That July, Marais won the bronze medal over 100 metres at the 2025 Summer World University Games in Bochum, Germany.

Marais placed third in 11.72 seconds April 2026, finishing behind Joviale Mbisha and Viwe Jingqi who recorded the same time of 11.52 seconds. She was selected for the South African team to compete at the 2026 World Athletics Relays in Gaborone, Botswana. Marais was part of the South African women 4 x 100 metres relay team which set a new national record on the opening day at the World Relays on 2 May, as the quartet of Jingqi, Kayla La Grange, Mbishe and Marais ran 43.22 seconds, surpassing the previous best set 26 years previously.

== Personal life ==
She studied at University of the Free State in Bloemfontein.
