= Athletics at the 2026 Commonwealth Games – Women's 100 metres =

Women's 100 metres at the 2026 Commonwealth Games
- Venue: Scotstoun Stadium, Glasgow
- Dates: 27 July 2026 (heats); 28 July 2026 (semifinals and final)
- Competitors: 53 from 43 nations
- Winning time: 10.93 AR

Medalists
| gold medal | Zoe Hobbs | New Zealand |
| silver medal | Amy Hunt | England |
| bronze medal | Torrie Lewis | Australia |

The women's 100 metres at the 2026 Commonwealth Games, as part of the athletics programme, will take place at the Scotstoun Stadium from 27 to 28 July 2026.

== Records ==
Prior to this competition, the existing world, Commonwealth and Commonwealth Games records were as follows:

Women's 100 Metres
| World record | 10.49 | Florence Griffith Joyner (USA) | Indianapolis, United States | 16 Jul 1988 |
| Commonwealth record | 10.54 | Elaine Thompson-Herah (JAM) | Eugene, United States | 21 Aug 2021 |
| Games record | 10.85 | Blessing Okagbare (NGR) | Glasgow, Scotland | 28 Jul 2014 |

== Schedule ==
The schedule is as follows:

| Date | Time | Round |
|---|---|---|
| 27 July 2026 | 12:00 | First round |
| 28 July 2026 | 19:36 | Semi-finals |
| 28 July 2026 | 21:40 | Final |

All times are United Kingdom time (UTC+1)

== Results ==
=== First round ===
The first round consisted of eight heats. The 17 best performers advanced to the semifinals.

==== Heat 1 ====
| Place | Lane | Athlete | Nation | Time | Notes |
|---|---|---|---|---|---|
| 1 | 3 | Mabel Akande | England | 11.32 | q |
| 2 | 5 | Gina Mariam Bass Bittaye | The Gambia | 11.35 | q |
| 3 | 6 | Claire Azzopardi | Malta | 11.87 | |
| 4 | 4 | Boitshepiso Kelapile | Botswana | 11.89 | |
| 5 | 2 | Aishath Shabaa Saleem | Maldives | 12.59 | SB |
| 6 | 7 | Chloe David | Vanuatu | 12.67 | SB |
| | | | | Wind: (−0.3 m/s) | |

==== Heat 2 ====
| Place | Lane | Athlete | Nation | Time | Notes |
|---|---|---|---|---|---|
| 1 | 4 | Leah Bertrand | Trinidad and Tobago | 11.44 | q |
| 2 | 3 | Ebony Lane | Australia | 11.50 | q |
| 3 | 7 | Isatou Sey | The Gambia | 11.73 | |
| 4 | 2 | Fayza Issaka Abdoukerim | Togo | 12.01 | |
| 5 | 6 | Hephzibah Romalus | Papua New Guinea | 12.70 | |
| 6 | 5 | Wena Gobure | Nauru | 13.40 | |
| | | | | Wind: (+0.9 m/s) | |

==== Heat 3 ====
| Place | Lane | Athlete | Nation | Time | Notes |
|---|---|---|---|---|---|
| 1 | 2 | Torrie Lewis | Australia | 11.15 | q |
| 2 | 6 | Geolyna Dowdye | Antigua and Barbuda | 11.28 | q |
| 3 | 4 | Faiqa Riaz | Pakistan | 11.64 | |
| 4 | 7 | Winfrida Makenji | Tanzania | 11.65 | |
| 5 | 8 | Tri-Tania Lowe | Anguilla | 11.87 | |
| 6 | 3 | Isila Apkup | Papua New Guinea | 12.01 | |
| 7 | 5 | Estelle Short | Cook Islands | 12.58 | |
| | | | | Wind: (+2.4 m/s) | |

==== Heat 4 ====
| Place | Lane | Athlete | Nation | Time | Notes |
|---|---|---|---|---|---|
| 1 | 4 | Shanti Pereira | Singapore | 11.24 | q, SB |
| 2 | 5 | Beyoncé Defreitas | British Virgin Islands | 11.33 | q |
| 3 | 3 | Edna Ng'andula | Zambia | 11.48 | q, PB |
| 4 | 7 | Keliza Smith | Guyana | 11.55 | SB |
| 5 | 8 | Ziva Moosa Shafeeu | Maldives | 12.09 | PB |
| 6 | 6 | Natasha Chetty | Seychelles | 12.13 | |
| 7 | 2 | Aribeta Birita | Kiribati | 13.85 | SB |
| | | | | Wind: (+1.1 m/s) | |

==== Heat 5 ====
| Place | Lane | Athlete | Nation | Time | Notes |
|---|---|---|---|---|---|
| 1 | 5 | Gabrielle Cole | Canada | 11.48 | q |
| 2 | 6 | Reese Webster | Trinidad and Tobago | 11.63 | |
| 3 | 4 | Nyimansata Jawneh | The Gambia | 11.68 | |
| 4 | 3 | Heleina Valetta Young | Fiji | 11.76 | |
| 5 | 2 | Denlyne Kinbangi | Papua New Guinea | 12.83 | |
| 6 | 7 | Claudie David | Vanuatu | 12.93 | |
| | | | | Wind: (+2.1 m/s) | |

==== Heat 6 ====
| Place | Lane | Athlete | Nation | Time | Notes |
|---|---|---|---|---|---|
| 1 | 3 | Imani Lansiquot | England | 11.04 | q |
| 2 | 5 | Michelle-Lee Ahye | Trinidad and Tobago | 11.35 | q |
| 3 | 4 | Soniya Jones | Antigua and Barbuda | 11.56 | |
| 4 | 6 | Magnifique Umutesiwase | Rwanda | 11.97 | YC |
| 5 | 8 | Nyasha Harris | Belize | 12.22 | |
| 6 | 7 | Amanda Khondowe | Malawi | 12.30 | |
| 7 | 2 | Sage Connor | Anguilla | 12.41 | |
| | | | | Wind: (+2.1 m/s) | |

==== Heat 7 ====
| Place | Lane | Athlete | Nation | Time | Notes |
|---|---|---|---|---|---|
| 1 | 7 | Sade McCreath | Canada | 11.33 | q |
| 2 | 6 | Pierrick-Linda Moulin | Gabon | 11.47 | q |
| 3 | 4 | Georgia Harris | Australia | 11.51 | q |
| 4 | 2 | Bongiwe Sakhile Mahlalela | Eswatini | 11.96 | SB |
| 5 | 5 | Ahnaa Nizaar | Maldives | 12.19 | PB |
| 6 | 8 | Elma Sesay | Sierra Leone | 12.28 | SB |
| 7 | 3 | Shirin Akter | Bangladesh | 12.39 | SB |
| | | | | Wind: (±0.0 m/s) | |

==== Heat 8 ====
| Place | Lane | Athlete | Nation | Time | Notes |
|---|---|---|---|---|---|
| 1 | 8 | Miracle Ezechukwu | Nigeria | 11.32 | q |
| 2 | 4 | Kishawna Niles | Barbados | 11.52 | q |
| 3 | 7 | Deborah Acheampong | Ghana | 11.66 | |
| 4 | 5 | Symone Tafuna'i | Samoa | 12.03 | |
| 5 | 3 | Nur Syafiqah Abdullah Md Mukhlis | Brunei | 13.46 | PB |
| 6 | 2 | Vaioleta Luka | Tuvalu | 13.56 | SB |
| — | 6 | Maliea Nalane | Lesotho | DNF | |
| | | | | Wind: (+1.5 m/s) | |

=== Semi-finals ===
Three semi finals were held. The two fastest competitors per semi (plus two fastest non-automatic qualifiers) advanced to the final.

==== Semi-final 1 ====
| Place | Lane | Athlete | Nation | Time | Notes |
|---|---|---|---|---|---|
| 1 | 3 | Torrie Lewis | Australia | 11.00 | Q, NR |
| 2 | 5 | Audrey Leduc | Canada | 11.01 | Q |
| 3 | 6 | Jodean Williams | Jamaica | 11.13 | q |
| 4 | 1 | Michelle-Lee Ahye | Trinidad and Tobago | 11.28 | SB |
| 5 | 2 | Gina Mariam Bass Bittaye | The Gambia | 11.29 | |
| 6 | 7 | Mabel Akande | England | 11.30 | |
| 7 | 8 | Geolyna Dowdye | Antigua and Barbuda | 11.45 | SB |
| 8 | 4 | Rosemary Chukwuma | Nigeria | 11.82 | |
| | | | | Wind: (+1.6 m/s) | |

==== Semi-final 2 ====
| Place | Lane | Athlete | Nation | Time | Notes |
|---|---|---|---|---|---|
| 1 | 3 | Imani Lansiquot | England | 11.13 | Q |
| 2 | 5 | Sade McCreath | Canada | 11.19 | Q |
| 3 | 6 | Beyoncé Defreitas | British Virgin Islands | 11.28 | |
| 4 | 8 | Kishawna Niles | Barbados | 11.44 | SB |
| 5 | 2 | Leah Bertrand | Trinidad and Tobago | 11.45 | |
| 6 | 7 | Ebony Lane | Australia | 11.52 | |
| 7 | 1 | Pierrick-Linda Moulin | Gabon | 11.54 | |
| — | 4 | Blessing Ogundiran | Nigeria | DNS | |
| | | | | Wind: (+0.7 m/s) | |

==== Semi-final 3 ====
| Place | Lane | Athlete | Nation | Time | Notes |
|---|---|---|---|---|---|
| 1 | 4 | Amy Hunt | England | 11.02 | Q |
| 2 | 5 | Zoe Hobbs | New Zealand | 11.04 | Q |
| 3 | 3 | Jonielle Smith | Jamaica | 11.07 | q |
| 4 | 6 | Miracle Ezechukwu | Nigeria | 11.23 | |
| 5 | 2 | Shanti Pereira | Singapore | 11.40 | |
| 6 | 7 | Gabrielle Cole | Canada | 11.44 | |
| 7 | 8 | Edna Ng'andula | Zambia | 11.64 | |
| 8 | 1 | Georgia Harris | Australia | 11.80 | |
| | | | | Wind: (+0.8 m/s) | |

=== Final ===
The final took place in the evening of the 28 July 2026.

| Place | Lane | Athlete | Nation | Time | Notes |
|---|---|---|---|---|---|
| 1st place, gold medalist(s) | 7 | Zoe Hobbs | New Zealand | 10.93 | AR |
| 2nd place, silver medalist(s) | 4 | Amy Hunt | England | 10.98 | |
| 3rd place, bronze medalist(s) | 3 | Torrie Lewis | Australia | 10.99 | NR |
| 4 | 5 | Imani Lansiquot | England | 11.02 | SB |
| 5 | 1 | Jodean Williams | Jamaica | 11.09 [.087] | |
| 6 | 6 | Audrey Leduc | Canada | 11.09 [.087] | |
| 7 | 2 | Sade McCreath | Canada | 11.14 | |
| — | 8 | Jonielle Smith | Jamaica | DNS | |
| | | | | Wind: (+1.0 m/s) | |
