= Benjamin Levy (judoka) =

British judoka (born 2005)

Personal information
- Born: 20 January 2005 (age 21)
- Occupation: Judoka

Sport
- Country: Great Britain
- Sport: Judo
- Weight class: ‍–‍73 kg

Achievements and titles
- World Champ.: R64 (2026)
- European Champ.: R16 (2026)
- Commonwealth Games: (silver) (2026)
Medal record
Men's judo
Representing Great Britain
IJF Grand Slam
Bronze medal – third place	2026 Paris	‍–‍73 kg
Representing England
Commonwealth Games
Silver medal – second place	2026 Glasgow	‍–‍73 kg

Profile at external databases
- IJF: 66336
- JudoInside.com: 152355
- Updated on 6 October 2026

Benjamin Levy (born 20 January 2005) is a British judoka. He won the silver medal at the 2026 Commonwealth Games in the 73 kg division.

== Biography ==
Trained at Budokwai in London, Levy studied at the University of Birmingham and joined the British Judo Elite World-Class Performance Programme in late 2024. As a junior in 2025, Levy won at the Warsaw European Open, Kaunas Junior European Cup, and Berlin Junior European Cup as well as making his senior debut representing Great Britain at the 2025 European Judo Championships.

In February 2026, Levy won the bronze medal at the Paris Grand Slam, recording a win over the world champion Joan-Benjamin Gaba in his debut at that level of competition. On 1 August, while representing England he won the silver medal at the 2026 Commonwealth Games in the 73kg division, defeated by compatriot Ethan Nairne by Yuko in the final.
