= Athletics at the 2026 Commonwealth Games – Men's 200 metres =

Men's 200 metres at the 2026 Commonwealth Games
- Venue: Scotstoun Stadium, Glasgow
- Dates: 29 July 2026 (round 1); 30 July 2026 (semi-finals); 31 July 2026 (final)
- Competitors: 78 from 38 nations
- Winning time: 19.96

Medalists
| gold medal | Sinesipho Dambile | South Africa |
| silver medal | Udodi Onwuzurike | Nigeria |
| bronze medal | Christopher Taylor | Jamaica |

The men's 200 metres at the 2026 Commonwealth Games, as part of the athletics programme, took place at the Scotstoun Stadium from 29 to 31 July 2026.

== Records ==
Prior to this competition, the existing world and Games records were as follows:

Men's 200 m
| World record | 19.19 | Usain Bolt (JAM) | 20 Aug 2009 | Berlin, Germany |
| Commonwealth record | 19.19 | Usain Bolt (JAM) | 20 Aug 2009 | Berlin, Germany |
| Games record | 19.80 | Jereem Richards (TTO) | 6 Aug 2022 | Birmingham, England |

== Schedule ==
The schedule is as follows:

| Date | Time | Round |
|---|---|---|
| 29 July 2026 | 11:32 | Round 1 |
| 30 July 2026 | 19:07 | Semi-finals |
| 31 July 2026 | 21:25 | Final |

All times are United Kingdom time (UTC+1)

== Results ==
=== Round 1 ===
Round 1 took place on the morning of 29 July 2026. 16 best performers (q) advanced to the semi-finals.

==== Heat 1 ====
| Place | Lane | Athlete | Nation | Time | Notes |
|---|---|---|---|---|---|
| 1 | 5 | Joseph Paul Amoah | Ghana | 20.36 [.358] | q |
| 2 | 3 | Christopher Taylor | Jamaica | 20.36 [.360] | q, SB |
| 3 | 2 | Mlandvo Maziya | Eswatini | 21.73 | |
| 4 | 4 | Hassan Saaid | Maldives | 22.10 | |
| 5 | 6 | Rizon Rara | Vanuatu | 22.49 | SB |
| — | 7 | Brendon Rodney | Canada | DQ | TR17.2.3 |
| — | 8 | Gael Barreau | Seychelles | DNS | |
| | | | | Wind: (+1.6 m/s) | |

==== Heat 2 ====
| Place | Lane | Athlete | Nation | Time | Notes |
|---|---|---|---|---|---|
| 1 | 6 | Zablon Ekwam | Kenya | 20.42 | q, SB |
| 2 | 8 | Wanyae Belle | British Virgin Islands | 20.79 | q |
| 3 | 5 | Alaba Akintola | Nigeria | 20.96 | |
| 4 | 4 | Reuben Rainer Lee | Singapore | 21.43 | |
| 5 | 7 | Sean Crowie | Saint Helena | 21.80 | SB |
| 6 | 2 | Leroy Kamau | Papua New Guinea | 22.14 | |
| | | | | Wind: (+2.0 m/s) | |

==== Heat 3 ====
| Place | Lane | Athlete | Nation | Time | Notes |
|---|---|---|---|---|---|
| 1 | 6 | Zharnel Hughes | England | 20.45 | q |
| 2 | 3 | Kuron Griffith | Barbados | 20.75 | q |
| 3 | 8 | Noa Bibi | Mauritius | 20.86 | |
| 4 | 5 | Marc Brian Louis | Singapore | 20.97 | SB |
| 5 | 2 | Ebrahima Camara | The Gambia | 21.60 | SB |
| 6 | 7 | Mohamed Bah | Sierra Leone | 22.15 | SB |
| — | 4 | Wissy Frank Hoye Yenda Moukoula | Gabon | DQ | TR17.2.3 |
| | | | | Wind: (+1.6 m/s) | |

==== Heat 4 ====
| Place | Lane | Athlete | Nation | Time | Notes |
|---|---|---|---|---|---|
| 1 | 5 | Animesh Kujur | India | 20.46 | q, SB |
| 2 | 4 | Emmanuel Eseme | Cameroon | 20.73 | q |
| 3 | 2 | Mvuyo Moss | South Africa | 21.02 | |
| 4 | 7 | Alieu Joof | The Gambia | 21.37 | |
| 5 | 3 | Thandaza Zwane | Eswatini | 21.95 | |
| 6 | 6 | Kente Mokheseng | Lesotho | 22.42 | SB |
| — | 8 | Toho Joshua | Vanuatu | DQ | TR17.2.3 |
| | | | | Wind: (+1.4 m/s) | |

==== Heat 5 ====
| Place | Lane | Athlete | Nation | Time | Notes |
|---|---|---|---|---|---|
| 1 | 5 | Udodi Onwuzurike | Nigeria | 20.31 | q |
| 2 | 4 | Shamar Horatio | Guyana | 20.83 | |
| 3 | 6 | Graham Pellegrini | Malta | 21.20 | |
| 4 | 7 | Harry Irfan | Singapore | 22.19 | |
| 5 | 8 | Usufono Eneli | Tuvalu | 23.07 | |
| — | 2 | Lamin Camara | The Gambia | DQ | TR17.2.3 |
| – | 3 | Claude Itoungue Bongogne | Cameroon | DNS | |
| | | | | Wind: (+2.4 m/s) | |

==== Heat 6 ====
| Place | Lane | Athlete | Nation | Time | Notes |
|---|---|---|---|---|---|
| 1 | 2 | Roshawn Clarke | Jamaica | 20.56 | q |
| 2 | 8 | Jackson Clarke | Guyana | 20.80 | |
| 3 | 7 | Kossi Nayo | Togo | 21.00 | |
| 4 | 4 | Zachary Saunders | Jersey | 21.29 | |
| 5 | 3 | Adriano Gumbs | British Virgin Islands | 21.77 | |
| 6 | 6 | Tevique Benjamin | Montserrat | 22.00 | =PB |
| 7 | 5 | Kanaee Malua | Tuvalu | 23.79 | SB |
| | | | | Wind: (+1.0 m/s) | |

==== Heat 7 ====
| Place | Lane | Athlete | Nation | Time | Notes |
|---|---|---|---|---|---|
| 1 | 6 | Jevaughn Powell | Jamaica | 20.28 | q |
| 2 | 7 | Lachlan Kennedy | Australia | 20.50 | q |
| 3 | 2 | Shaquane Toussaint | Grenada | 20.87 | |
| 4 | 5 | Aruna Darshana | Sri Lanka | 20.96 | |
| 5 | 4 | Steven Mackay | Jersey | 21.70 | |
| 6 | 1 | Odysius Melanie | Seychelles | 21.88 | |
| 7 | 8 | Riffath Adam | Maldives | 22.13 | |
| — | 3 | Tyler Anthony | Saint Helena | DQ | TR17.2.3 |
| | | | | Wind: (+2.6 m/s) | |

==== Heat 8 ====
| Place | Lane | Athlete | Nation | Time | Notes |
|---|---|---|---|---|---|
| 1 | 5 | Justice Oratile | Botswana | 20.58 | q |
| 2 | 4 | Steven Gardiner | Bahamas | 20.85 | |
| 3 | 2 | Charley Matundu | Namibia | 21.00 | |
| 4 | 7 | Jamie Oldham | Jersey | 21.02 | PB |
| 5 | 8 | Pau Funes Fa | Gibraltar | 23.34 | |
| — | 6 | Norre Robinson | Bermuda | DNF | |
| — | 3 | Lerano Missick | Turks and Caicos Islands | DNS | |
| | | | | Wind: (+1.2 m/s) | |

==== Heat 9 ====
| Place | Lane | Athlete | Nation | Time | Notes |
|---|---|---|---|---|---|
| 1 | 4 | James Dadzie | Ghana | 20.65 | q |
| 2 | 6 | Guy Maganga | Gabon | 20.69 | q |
| 3 | 8 | Joshan Vencatasamy | Mauritius | 21.49 | |
| 4 | 3 | Trenton Brooks | Anguilla | 21.50 | SB |
| 5 | 5 | Neo Ntelele | Lesotho | 21.70 | SB |
| 6 | 7 | Zeek Suad Hussain | Maldives | 22.29 | |
| — | 2 | Elkana Sabila | Kenya | DQ | TR17.2.3 |
| | | | | Wind: (+1.7 m/s) | |

==== Heat 10 ====
| Place | Lane | Athlete | Nation | Time | Notes |
|---|---|---|---|---|---|
| 1 | 4 | Jaleel Croal | British Virgin Islands | 20.53 | q |
| 2 | 7 | Malith Thamel | Sri Lanka | 20.99 | |
| 3 | 3 | Mojela Koneshe | Lesotho | 21.76 | |
| 4 | 5 | Tovetuna Tuna | Papua New Guinea | 21.76 | SB |
| 5 | 8 | Noelex Holder | Guyana | 21.90 | SB |
| 6 | 2 | Blaze Baldwin | Saint Helena | 23.98 | PB |
| | | | | Wind: (+1.5 m/s) | |

=== Semi-finals ===
The semi-finals took place on the evening of 30 July 2026. First 2 in each heat (Q) and the next 2 fastest (q) advance to the Final.

==== Heat 1 ====
| Place | Lane | Athlete | Nation | Time | Notes |
|---|---|---|---|---|---|
| 1 | 3 | Christopher Taylor | Jamaica | 20.20 | Q |
| 2 | 6 | Udodi Onwuzurike | Nigeria | 20.22 | Q |
| 3 | 8 | Justice Oratile | Botswana | 20.47 | |
| 4 | 4 | James Dadzie | Ghana | 20.52 | |
| 5 | 2 | Kuron Griffith | Barbados | 20.66 | |
| 6 | 5 | Zharnel Hughes | England | 20.67 | |
| 7 | 7 | Aidan Murphy | Australia | 20.70 | |
| 8 | 1 | Wanyae Belle | British Virgin Islands | 21.13 | |
| | | | | Wind: (+3.5 m/s) | |

==== Heat 2 ====
| Place | Lane | Athlete | Nation | Time | Notes |
|---|---|---|---|---|---|
| 1 | 3 | Joseph Paul Amoah | Ghana | 20.24 [.237] | Q, SB |
| 2 | 4 | Jevaughn Powell | Jamaica | 20.24 [.239] | Q, SB |
| 3 | 5 | Phaezel Selepe | Botswana | 20.31 | q |
| 4 | 6 | Mthi Mthimkulu | South Africa | 20.39 | |
| 5 | 8 | Calab Law | Australia | 20.60 | |
| 6 | 1 | Animesh Kujur | India | 20.65 | |
| 7 | 7 | Jackson Clarke | Guyana | 20.70 | |
| 8 | 2 | Guy Maganga Gorra | Gabon | 21.10 | |
| | | | | Wind: (+2.0 m/s) | |

==== Heat 3 ====
| Place | Lane | Athlete | Nation | Time | Notes |
|---|---|---|---|---|---|
| 1 | 7 | Sinesipho Dambile | South Africa | 19.82 | Q |
| 2 | 6 | Aaron Brown | Canada | 19.90 | Q |
| 3 | 8 | Lachlan Kennedy | Australia | 20.12 | q |
| 4 | 1 | Emmanuel Eseme | Cameroon | 20.32 | |
| 5 | 3 | Jaleel Croal | British Virgin Islands | 20.42 | |
| 6 | 2 | Zablon Ekwam | Kenya | 20.64 | |
| 7 | 5 | Mustapha Bokpin | Ghana | 20.65 | |
| — | 4 | Roshawn Clarke | Jamaica | DNF | |
| | | | | Wind: (+2.3 m/s) | |

=== Final ===
The final took place on the evening of 31 July 2026.

| Place | Lane | Athlete | Nation | Time | Notes |
|---|---|---|---|---|---|
| 1st place, gold medalist(s) | 6 | Sinesipho Dambile | South Africa | 19.96 | |
| 2nd place, silver medalist(s) | 8 | Udodi Onwuzurike | Nigeria | 20.09 | SB |
| 3rd place, bronze medalist(s) | 7 | Christopher Taylor | Jamaica | 20.11 | PB |
| 4 | 4 | Aaron Brown | Canada | 20.18 | |
| 5 | 3 | Jevaughn Powell | Jamaica | 20.36 | |
| 6 | 1 | Lachlan Kennedy | Australia | 20.41 | |
| 7 | 5 | Joseph Paul Amoah | Ghana | 20.47 | |
| 8 | 2 | Prince Phaezel Selepe | Botswana | 20.54 | |
| | | | | Wind: (+1.7 m/s) | |
