= Olivia Gross =

Australian athlete

Personal information
- Nationality: Australian
- Born: 29 August 2002 (age 24)

Sport
- Sport: athletics
- Event: Pole vault

Achievements and titles
- Personal bests: Pole vault: 4.35m (Perth, 2025)

Olivia Gross (born 29 August 2002) is an Australian track and field athlete. In 2025, she won the Australian Athletics Championships in the pole vault.

== Career ==
From Geelong, Victoria, she later became based in Perth, Western Australia, joining the Western Australian Institute for Sport on a scholarship in 2021. She came third in the Australian Athletics Championships in March 2023, equalling her personal best clearance of 4.10m.

On 27 March 2024, she set a new personal best clearance of 4.20m in Perth. She finished runner-up at the 2024 Australian Athletics Championships in Adelaide on 13 April 2024.

She increased her personal best to 4.35 metres at the Perth Classic on 1 March 2025. She won the Australian Athletics Championships in Perth on 12 April 2025.

== Personal life ==
She is the sister of sprinter Mia Gross. She is a trained Pilates instructor. Gross is currently in a relationship with Jed Bews, who is a premiership player for the Geelong Football Club.
