= Monique Hanlon =

Australian sprinter

Personal information
- Born: 28 July 2004 (age 22)

Sport
- Sport: Athletics
- Event: Sprint

Achievements and titles
- Personal bests: 100m: 11.49 (Perth, 2026); 200m: 22.60 (London, 2026)

Monique Hanlon (born 28 July 2004) is an Australian sprinter.

== Early life ==
As a 15 year-old, Hanlon won gold in the age-group 200 m, silver in the 100 m and was a member of a record breaking gold medal winning 4 x 100 m relay team at the also Australian Schools Championships in Cairns.

== Career ==
Competing in Europe in 2023, Hanlon placed second over 200 metres behind German Holly Okuku at the Mannheim Junior Gala, and was third across the line over 200 metres at the UK U20 Championships, won by Success Eduan.

Hanlon won the 200 metres at the 2026 Perth Track Classic and Hobart Track Classic in February 2026. The following month, she was part of a women's 4 x 100 metres relay team which set a meeting record at the Adelaide Invitational, alongside Ebony Lane, Olivia Rose Inkster and Chloe Mannix-Power. She also won the 200 metres at the Maurie Plant Meet in Melbourne, on 28 March 2026, finishing ahead of Mia Gross in 23.61 seconds.

On 11 April 2026, she was a finalist over 100 metres at the 2026 Australian Athletics Championships, placing fourth overall in 11.56 seconds (-0.4 m/s). She also placed third behind Lakara Stallan in the 200 metres at the championships in 23.37 seconds. Hanlon was selected for the Australian team to compete at the 2026 World Athletics Relays in Gaborone, Botswana, running as part of the women's 4 x 100 metres relay team. On the second day, the quartet of Hanlon, Lane, Georgia Harris and Torrie Lewis won their heat to successfully qualify for the 2027 World Championships. She was selected for the 200 metres as part of the Australian team to compete at the 2026 Oceania Athletics Championships in Darwin, Northern Territory. She was a semi-finalist in the 200 metres at the 2026 Commonwealth Games in Glasgow, Scotland. Later at the Games, she also competed in the women's 4 × 100 m relay.

== Personal life ==
Hanlon studies medicine at Queensland University of Technology. In 2025 and 2026 she was a recipient of the Neville Sillitoe Foundation Scholarship. Her sister Marissa is also an athlete who competes as a sprinter.
