= Dayyan Boulemtafes =

French judoka (born 2005)

Personal information
- Born: 16 October 2005 (age 20)
- Occupation: Judoka

Sport
- Country: France
- Sport: Judo
- Weight class: ‍–‍73 kg

Achievements and titles
- World Champ.: (bronze) (2026)
- European Champ.: (bronze) (2026)
Medal record
Men's judo
Representing France
World Championships
Bronze medal – third place	2026 Baku	‍–‍73 kg
European Championships
Bronze medal – third place	2026 Tbilisi	‍–‍73 kg
IJF Grand Prix
Silver medal – second place	2025 Lima	‍–‍73 kg

Profile at external databases
- IJF: 60027
- JudoInside.com: 144334
- Updated on 6 October 2026

Dayyan Boulemtafes (born 16 October 2005) is a French Judoka.

== Career ==
In October 2025, Boulemtafes competed at the 2025 Judo Grand Prix Lima and won a silver medal in the –73 kg category, his first career Grand Prix medal.

In April 2026, he competed at the 2026 European Judo Championships and won a bronze medal in the –73 kg category. He was scheduled to compete in the 2026 Judo Grand Slam Lausanne in August 2026, however he withdrew from the competition to rest for the 2026 World Judo Championships. During the World Championships he advanced to the semifinals of –73 kg category, where lost to eventual gold medalist Ryuga Tanaka. In the repechage, he defeated Israel's Yehonatan Elbaz to win a bronze medal.
