= Judo at the 2026 Commonwealth Games – Men's 73 kg =

Judo competition

Judo – Men's 73 kg at the 2026 Commonwealth Games
- Venue: SEC Centre, Glasgow
- Date: August 1 2026
- Competitors: 17

Medalists
gold medal	Ethan Nairne	England
silver medal	Benjamin Levy	England
bronze medal	Joshua Green	Northern Ireland
bronze medal	Faye Njie	The Gambia

The Men's 73 kg judo competitions at the 2026 Commonwealth Games in Glasgow, Scotland took place on August 1 at the SEC Centre. Nineteen judoka will take part in this class.

== Seedings ==
The following judoka were seeded in advance of the draw:

Men's 73 kg
Seed	Judoka	Nation
1	Justin Lemire	Canada
2	Ethan Nairne	England
3	Benjamin Levy	England
4	Joshua Green	Northern Ireland
5	Joel Robinson	New Zealand
6	Arun Kumar	India
7	Faye Njie	The Gambia
8	Oliver Short	Scotland

== Final phase ==
=== Gold final path ===
Gold medal final
Ethan Nairne (ENG)	001 (yellow card)
Benjamin Levy (ENG)	000

=== Repechage/bronze medal path ===
Competitors who were eliminated by either of the finalists during the competition enter the repechage for a bronze medal.

Repechage
Ben Moore (WAL)	010 (yellow card)
Joel Robinson (NZL)	001
Xavion Johnson (BAH)	000
Oliver Short (SCO)	100

Bronze medal
Ben Moore (WAL)	000
Joshua Green (NIR)	010
Oliver Short (SCO)	000 (yellow card)
Faye Njie (GAM)	100

== Preliminary phase ==
=== Top half ===
Round of 32
John Kapungwe (ZAM)	010
Chamara Repiyallage (SRI)	011

Round of 16
Ethan Nairne (ENG)	102
Daniel Pacitti (SCO)	001
Ben Moore (WAL)	101
Chamara Repiyallage (SRI)	000 (yellow card)
Joel Robinson (NZL)	100
Jelanie Boyce (TTO)	000
Faye Njie (GAM)	100
Alister Sukhamana (SOL)	000

Quarterfinals
Ethan Nairne (ENG)	001
Ben Moore (WAL)	000
Joel Robinson (NZL)	000
Faye Njie (GAM)	102 (yellow card)

Semifinal
Ethan Nairne (ENG)	011
Faye Njie (GAM)	000

=== Bottom half ===
Round of 32

Round of 16
Benjamin Levy (ENG)	100
Brave Chipokosa (MAW)	000
Xavion Johnson (BAH)	101
Taiwo Aremu (NGR)	000 (yellow card)
Joshua Green (NIR)	001 (yellow card)
Mattheo Lawson (TOG)	000
Oliver Short (SCO)	100
Hamray Temaki (NRU)	000

Quarterfinals
Benjamin Levy (ENG)	100 (yellow card)
Xavion Johnson (BAH)	000 (yellow card)
Joshua Green (NIR)	001
Oliver Short (SCO)	000

Semifinal
Benjamin Levy (ENG)	011 (yellow card)
Joshua Green (NIR)	000
