= 2026 World Judo Championships – Men's 73 kg =

Judo competition

Judo Men's 73 kg at the 2026 World Judo Championships
- Venue: National Gymnastics Arena
- Location: Baku, Azerbaijan
- Date: 6 October 2026
- Competitors: 50 from 38 nations
- Total prize money: €57,000

Medalists
| gold medal | Ryuga Tanaka (1st title) | Japan |
| silver medal | Makhmadbek Makhmadbekov | United Arab Emirates |
| bronze medal | Rashid Mammadaliyev | Azerbaijan |
| bronze medal | Dayyan Boulemtafes | France |

Competition at external databases
- Links: IJF • JudoInside

The men's 73 kg event at the 2026 World Judo Championships was held at the National Gymnastics Arena in Baku, Azerbaijan on 6 October 2026.

== Results ==
=== Finals ===
Semi-finals
(Japan) Ryuga Tanaka | 010
(France) Dayyan Boulemtafes | 000
(Brazil) Daniel Cargnin | 000
(United Arab Emirates) Makhmadbek Makhmadbekov | 100

Final
(Japan) Ryuga Tanaka | 001 (yellow card)
(United Arab Emirates) Makhmadbek Makhmadbekov | 000

=== Repechage ===
Repechage
(Italy) Leonardo Valeriani | 000 (yellow card)
(Azerbaijan) Rashid Mammadaliyev | 100 (yellow card)
(Italy) Giovanni Esposito | 000
(Israel) Yehonatan Elbaz | 102

Bronze medal
(Azerbaijan) Rashid Mammadaliyev | 100
(Brazil) Daniel Cargnin | 000
(Israel) Yehonatan Elbaz | 000
(France) Dayyan Boulemtafes | 111

=== Pool A ===
First round
~~(South Korea) An Jae-hong~~
(Ukraine) Said-Magomed Khalidov | w/o
(Portugal) Otari Kvantidze | 000
(Japan) Ryuga Tanaka | 100
(Republic of Ireland) Joshua Green | 000
(Kosovo) Dardan Cena | 010
(Italy) Leonardo Valeriani | 110
(Turkey) Bilal Çiloğlu | 000 (yellow card)
(Israel) Ohad Moritz | 000
(Brazil) Guilherme de Oliveira | 011

Round of 32
(Tajikistan) Muhiddin Asadulloev | 101
(Ukraine) Said-Magomed Khalidov | 000
(Japan) Ryuga Tanaka | 101
(Bulgaria) Mark Hristov | 000
(Georgia (country)) Lasha Shavdatuashvili | 000
(Kosovo) Dardan Cena | 100
(Italy) Leonardo Valeriani | 101
(Brazil) Guilherme de Oliveira | 000

Round of 16
(Tajikistan) Muhiddin Asadulloev | 000
(Japan) Ryuga Tanaka | 101 (yellow card)
(Kosovo) Dardan Cena | 000 (yellow card)
(Italy) Leonardo Valeriani | 020 (yellow card)

Quarter-finals
(Japan) Ryuga Tanaka | 001
(Italy) Leonardo Valeriani | 000 (yellow card)

=== Pool B ===
First round
(Hungary) Aron Gabor | 010
(United Arab Emirates) Kazbek Naguchev | 020
(Kazakhstan) Angsarbek Gainullin | 000
(France) Dayyan Boulemtafes | 100
(Moldova) Adil Osmanov | 000
(Canada) Justin Lemire | 001
(United Kingdom) Ethan Nairne | 012 (yellow card)
(Uzbekistan) Elbek Tojiev | 000 (yellow card)

Round of 32
(Russia) Danil Lavrentev | 100 (yellow card)
(United Arab Emirates) Kazbek Naguchev | 012
(France) Dayyan Boulemtafes | 020
(Australia) Kohsei Toyoshima | 000
(Azerbaijan) Rashid Mammadaliyev | 010
(Canada) Justin Lemire | 000
(United Kingdom) Ethan Nairne | 110 (yellow card)
(Bahrain) Mukhamed Aloev | 000 (yellow card)

Round of 16
(Russia) Danil Lavrentev | 000
(France) Dayyan Boulemtafes | 010
(Azerbaijan) Rashid Mammadaliyev | 011 (yellow card)
(United Kingdom) Ethan Nairne | 001

Quarter-finals
(France) Dayyan Boulemtafes | 002 (yellow card)
(Azerbaijan) Rashid Mammadaliyev | 000

=== Pool C ===
First round
(Czech Republic) Chusniddin Karimov | 000
(Turkmenistan) Meylis Shamuradov | 001
(United Kingdom) Benjamin Levy | 001
(Turkey) İbrahim Demirel | 100
(Sweden) Narek Vardanian | 102
Paul Jouel Alima Fouda | 000
(Hungary) Áron Szabó | 000
(Algeria) Messaoud Dris | 010 (yellow card)
(Kosovo) Akil Gjakova | 000
(Azerbaijan) Hidayat Heydarov | 020 (yellow card)

Round of 32
(Brazil) Daniel Cargnin | 010 (yellow card)
(Turkmenistan) Meylis Shamuradov | 000
(Turkey) İbrahim Demirel | 001 (yellow card)
(Sweden) Narek Vardanian | 011
(Italy) Giovanni Esposito | 010 (yellow card)
(Algeria) Messaoud Dris | 000 (yellow card)
(Azerbaijan) Hidayat Heydarov | 001 (yellow card)
(Finland) Valtteri Olin | 000

Round of 16
(Brazil) Daniel Cargnin | 101 (yellow card)
(Sweden) Narek Vardanian | 000
(Italy) Giovanni Esposito | 100 (yellow card)
(Azerbaijan) Hidayat Heydarov | 000

Quarter-finals
(Brazil) Daniel Cargnin | 011 (yellow card)
(Italy) Giovanni Esposito | 001

=== Pool D ===
First round
(Mongolia) Odgereliin Uranbayar | 102 (yellow card)
(Spain) Anton Shuhalieiev | 000
(Moldova) Vlad Mitru | 000 (yellow card)
(Romania) Ioan Dzițac | 021
(Morocco) Hassan Doukkali | 101 (yellow card)
(Slovenia) Martin Hojak | 000
(Bulgaria) Victor Skerlev | 001
(France) Joan-Benjamin Gaba | 000

Round of 32
(United Arab Emirates) Makhmadbek Makhmadbekov | 100 (yellow card)
(Mongolia) Odgereliin Uranbayar | 000 (yellow card)
(Romania) Ioan Dzițac | 001
(The Gambia) Faye Njie | 000
(United States) Jack Yonezuka | 001
(Morocco) Hassan Doukkali | 000
(Bulgaria) Victor Skerlev | 000
(Israel) Yehonatan Elbaz | 011 (yellow card)

Round of 16
(United Arab Emirates) Makhmadbek Makhmadbekov | 020
(Romania) Ioan Dzițac | 001 (yellow card)
(United States) Jack Yonezuka | 000 (yellow card)
(Israel) Yehonatan Elbaz | 100

Quarter-finals
(United Arab Emirates) Makhmadbek Makhmadbekov | 100
(Israel) Yehonatan Elbaz | 000

== Prize money ==
The sums listed bring the total prizes awarded to €57,000 for the individual event.

| Medal | Total | Judoka | Coach |
|---|---|---|---|
| Gold | €26,000 | €20,800 | €5,200 |
| Silver | €15,000 | €12,000 | €3,000 |
| Bronze | €8,000 | €6,400 | €1,600 |
