= Sierra Leone at the 2026 Commonwealth Games =

- Flag of Sierra Leone
- CG code: SLE
- CGA: National Olympic Committee of Sierra Leone
- Website: facebook.com/nocsle (Facebook)

in Glasgow, Scotland 23 July 2026 – 2 August 2026
- Competitors: 19 in 5 sports
- Flag bearer: Jordan Aki-Sawyerr
- Baton bearer: Josefien Betist
- Medals: Gold 0 Silver 0 Bronze 0 Total 0

Commonwealth Games appearances (overview)
- 1958; 1962; 1966; 1970; 1974; 1978; 1982–1986; 1990; 1994; 1998; 2002; 2006; 2010; 2014; 2018; 2022; 2026; 2030

Sierra Leone compete at the 2026 Commonwealth Games in Glasgow, Scotland. This marked Sierra Leone's 13th participation at the games, after making its debut at the 1970 Commonwealth Games.

The King's Baton relay stopped in Sierra Leone in July 2025.

The Sierra Leone team was expected to compete in six sports. However, the final discipline of artistic gymnastics was withdrawn due to eligibility reasons. The Sierra Leone team consisted of 24 athletes. However final entries only showed 19 athletes (ten men and nine women).

Triple jumper Jordan Aki-Sawyerr was the country's flagbearer during the opening ceremony. Meanwhile, boxer Josefien Betist was the baton bearer during the opening ceremony.

Sierra Leone did not win a medal at the Games, leaving the country still in search of its first Commonwealth Games medal.

== Competitors ==
The following is the list of number of competitors participating at the Games per sport/discipline.

Sport	Men	Women	Total
Athletics	4	4	8
Boxing	0	1	1
Judo	1	2	3
Swimming	3	2	5
Track cycling	2	0	2
Total	9	10	19

== Athletics ==
Sierra Leone entered eight athletes (four men and four women).

Key

Ranks given for track events are within the athlete's heat only.

- Q = Qualified for the next round
- q = Qualified for the next round as a fastest loser or, in field events, by position without achieving the qualifying target

Track events

Athlete	Event	Heat		Semifinal		Final	
Athlete	Event	Result	Rank	Result	Rank	Result	Rank
Mohamed Bah	Men's 200 m	22.15	6	Did not advance			
Mohamed Bah	Men's 400 m	49.20	6	Did not advance			
Edward Sesay	Men's 800 m	DQ		Did not advance			
Moses Koroma	Men's 110 m hurdles	DQ		—N/a		Did not advance	
Moses Koroma	Men's 400 m hurdles	54.58	7	—N/a		Did not advance	
Elma Sesay	Women's 100 m	12.28	6	Did not advance			
Elma Sesay	Women's 200 m	DQ		Did not advance			
Marie Bangura	Women's 200 m	DQ		Did not advance			
Marie Bangura	Women's 400 m	DQ		Did not advance			
Mary Kamara	Women's 800 m	DQ		Did not advance			
Jane Kargbo	Women's 800 m	2:20.43	8	Did not advance			
Jane Kargbo	Women's mile	5:22.20	11	—N/a		Did not advance	
Mohamed Bah; Moses Koroma; Marie Bangura; Jane Kargbo	Mixed 4 × 400 m relay	DQ		—N/a		Did not advance	

Field events

Athlete	Event	Qualification		Final	
Athlete	Event	Result	Rank	Result	Rank
Jordan Aki-Sawyerr	Men's triple jump	15.12	13	Did not advance	

== Boxing ==
Sierra Leone entered one female boxer. Irish born Josefien Betist represented the country.

Athlete	Event	Round of 16	Quarterfinals	Semifinals	Final	
Athlete	Event	Opposition Result	Opposition Result	Opposition Result	Opposition Result	Rank
Josefien Betist	Women's 60 kg	Bye	Kings-Wheatley (ENG); L 2–3	Did not advance		

== Judo ==
Sierra Leone entered three judoka (one man and two women).

Athlete	Event	Round of 16	Quarterfinals	Semifinals	Repechage	Final/BM	
Athlete	Event	Opposition Result	Opposition Result	Opposition Result	Opposition Result	Opposition Result	Rank
Frederick Harris	Men's 90 kg	Naheu (CMR); L 000–100	Did not advance				
Jane Massaquoi	Women's 52 kg	Chopade (IND); L 000–100	Did not advance				
Adama Sesay	Women's 57 kg	Agyei (GHA); L 010–100	Did not advance				

== Swimming ==
Sierra Leone entered five swimmers (three men and two women).

Athlete	Event	Heat		Semifinal		Final	
Athlete	Event	Time	Rank	Time	Rank	Time	Rank
Moses Yongai	Men's 50 m freestyle	30.27	66	Did not advance			
Moses Yongai	Men's 100 m freestyle	1:09.96	66	Did not advance			
Moses Yongai	Men's 50 m butterfly	31.45	68	Did not advance			
Moses Yongai	Men's 100 m butterfly	DNS		Did not advance			
Ibrahim Kamara	Men's 50 m backstroke	37.40	38	Did not advance			
Ibrahim Kamara	Men's 50 m breaststroke	37.82	56	Did not advance			
John Samura	Men's 50 m backstroke	37.44	39	Did not advance			
John Samura	Men's 50 m breaststroke	37.68	55	Did not advance			
John Samura	Men's 100 m breaststroke	DNS		Did not advance			
Halle Harris	Women's 50 m freestyle	26.01	18	Did not advance			
Halle Harris	Women's 100 m freestyle	58.39	29	Did not advance			
Halle Harris	Women's 50 m backstroke	29.07	12 Q	29.01	13	Did not advance	
Halle Harris	Women's 100 m backstroke	1:04.13	20	Did not advance			
Halle Harris	Women's 50 m butterfly	27.84	19	Did not advance			
Olamiday Sam	Women's 50 m freestyle	34.46	65	Did not advance			
Olamiday Sam	Women's 100 m freestyle	1:16.87	63	Did not advance			

== Track cycling ==
Sierra Leone entered two male track cyclists. This marked the Sierra Leone's debut in the discipline at the Commonwealth Games.

Pursuit

Athlete	Event	Qualification		Final	
Athlete	Event	Time	Rank	Opponent Results	Rank
Ibrahim Jalloh	Men's individual pursuit	5:10.110	20	Did not advance	
Mustapha Koroma	Men's individual pursuit	5:41.361	22	Did not advance	

Sprint

Athlete	Event	Qualification		Round 1	Quarterfinals	Semifinals	Final	
Athlete	Event	Time	Rank	Opposition Result	Opposition Result	Opposition Result	Opposition Result	Rank
Ibrahim Jalloh	Men's sprint	12.963	27	Did not advance				
Mustapha Koroma	Men's sprint	13.379	28	Did not advance				
