= Maldives at the 2026 Commonwealth Games =

- Flag of Maldives
- CG code: MDV
- CGA: Maldives Olympic Committee
- Website: www.olympic.mv

in Glasgow, Scotland 23 July 2026 – 2 August 2026
- Competitors: 13 in 2 sports
- Flag bearer: Mohamed Aan Hussain
- Baton bearer: Meral Ayn Latheef
- Medals: Gold 0 Silver 0 Bronze 0 Total 0

Commonwealth Games appearances (overview)
- 1986; 1990; 1994; 1998; 2002; 2006; 2010; 2014; 2018; 2022; 2026; 2030

The Maldives competed at the 2026 Commonwealth Games in Glasgow, Scotland. This marked Maldives' tenth participation at the games, after making its debut at the 1986 Commonwealth Games.

The King's Baton relay stopped in Maldives in December 2025.

The Maldives team consisted of 13 athletes competing in two sports: athletics and swimming. Swimmer Mohamed Aan Hussain was the country's flagbearer during the opening ceremony. Meanwhile, fellow swimmer Meral Ayn Latheef was the baton bearer during the opening ceremony.

== Competitors ==
The following is the list of number of competitors participating at the Games per sport/discipline.

Sport	Men	Women	Total
Athletics	3	5	8
Swimming	3	2	5
Total	6	6	13

== Athletics ==
The Maldives entered eight track and field athletes.

Key

Ranks given for track events are within the athlete's heat only.

- Q = Qualified for the next round
- q = Qualified for the next round as a fastest loser or, in field events, by position without achieving the qualifying target

Track events

Athlete	Event	Heat		Semifinal		Final	
Athlete	Event	Result	Rank	Result	Rank	Result	Rank
Hassan Saaid	Men's 100 m	10.77	5	Did not advance			
Hassan Saaid	Men's 200 m	22.10	48	Did not advance			
Riffath Adam	Men's 200 m	22.13	49	Did not advance			
Riffath Adam	Men's 400 m	50.91	42	Did not advance			
Zeek Suad Hussain	Men's 200 m	22.19	53	Did not advance			
Zeek Suad Hussain	Men's 400 m	49.96	38	Did not advance			
Ahnaa Nizar	Women's 100 m	12.19	5	Did not advance			
Ahnaa Nizar	Women's 200 m	24.75	29	Did not advance			
Aishath Shabaa Saleem	Women's 100 m	12.59	5	Did not advance			
Ziva Moosa Shafeeu	Women's 100 m	12.09	5	Did not advance			
Ziva Moosa Shafeeu	Women's 200 m	24.67	28	Did not advance			
Aminath Layaana Mohamed	Women's 200 m	25.85	33	Did not advance			
Aminath Layaana Mohamed	Women's 400 m	1:01.05	21	Did not advance			
Fasuhaa Ahmed	Women's 800 m	2:19.86	25	Did not advance			
Aishath Shabaa Saleem; Ziva Moosa Shafeeu; Aminath Layaana; Ahbaa Nizaar	Women's 4 × 100 m relay	47.04 NR	10	—N/a		Did not advance	
Riffath Adam; Fasuhaa Ahmed; Zeek Suad Hussain; Ahnaa Nizaar	Mixed 4 × 400 m relay	3:41.03 SB	12	—N/a		Did not advance	

== Swimming ==
The Maldives entered five swimmers. The swimming team broke 12 national records, with each of the five swimmers breaking at least one record.

Athlete	Event	Heat		Semifinal		Final	
Athlete	Event	Time	Rank	Time	Rank	Time	Rank
Mohamed Rihan Shiham	Men's 100 m backstroke	1:05.75	27	Did not advance			
Mohamed Rihan Shiham	Men's 200 m butterfly	2:23.94	19	Did not advance			
Mohamed Rihan Shiham	Men's 400 m individual medley	5:09.68	11	Did not advance			
Looth Mohamed Hussain	Men's 50 m breaststroke	31.54	48	Did not advance			
Looth Mohamed Hussain	Men's 100 m breaststroke	1:10.63	40	Did not advance			
Looth Mohamed Hussain	Men's 200 m breaststroke	2:42.93	17	Did not advance			
Mohamed Aan Hussain	Men's 50 m Breaststroke	31.54	48	Did not advance			
Mohamed Aan Hussain	Men's 100 m Breaststroke	1:10.63	40	Did not advance			
Mohamed Aan Hussain	Men's 200 m Breaststroke	2:42.93	17	Did not advance			
Amna Mirsaad	Women's 50 m freestyle	27.99	46	Did not advance			
Amna Mirsaad	Women's 100 m freestyle	1:02.74	52	Did not advance			
Amna Mirsaad	Women's 50 m backstroke	31.55	30	Did not advance			
Meral Ayn Latheef	Women's 200 m freestyle	2:25.08	36	Did not advance			
Meral Ayn Latheef	Women's 200 m individual medley	2:43.93	17	Did not advance			
Meral Ayn Latheef	Women's 400 m individual medley	6:03.71	11	Did not advance			
