= British Guiana at the 1962 British Empire and Commonwealth Games =

- CGF code: BGU
- CGA: British Guiana Olympic Association

in Perth, Western Australia
- Competitors: 1 in 1 sport
- Flag bearers: Opening: Closing:
- Medals Ranked 17th: Gold 0 Silver 0 Bronze 1 Total 1

British Empire and Commonwealth Games appearances (overview)
- 1930; 1934; 1938; 1950; 1954; 1958; 1962; 1966; 1970; 1974; 1978; 1982; 1986; 1990; 1994; 1998; 2002; 2006; 2010; 2014; 2018; 2022; 2026; 2030

British Guiana competed at the 1962 British Empire and Commonwealth Games in Perth, Western Australia, from 22 November to 1 December 1962. It won one bronze medal at the games.

== Medalists ==
Medal	Name	Sport	Event	Date
Bronze	Martin Dias	Weightlifting	Bantamweight	26 November

== Weightlifting ==
Men

Athlete	Event	Press		Snatch		Clean & Jerk		Total	Rank
Athlete	Event	Result	Rank	Result	Rank	Result	Rank	Total	Rank
Martin Dias	Bantamweight	190 lb (86 kg)	=6	210 lb (95 kg)	2	275 lb (125 kg)	2	675 lb (306 kg)	3rd place, bronze medalist(s)
