= Leah O'Brien (sprinter) =

Australian sprinter (born 2008)

Personal information
- Nationality: Australian
- Born: 29 January 2008 (age 18)

Sport
- Sport: Athletics
- Event: Sprint

Achievements and titles
- Personal bests: 60m: 7.53 (Perth, 2025); 100m: 11.14 (Perth, 2025) NU18R; 200m: 23.37 (Perth, 2025)

Leah O'Brien (born 29 January 2008) is an Australian sprinter. In 2025, she became Australian junior national record holder over 100 metres and was runner-up over that distance at the senior Australian Athletics Championships.

== Career ==
On 8 April 2025, O'Brien won the under-18 girls 100 metres title at the Australian National Junior Athletics Championships in a time of 11.14 seconds (+1.7), breaking Raelene Boyle's under-18 national record set 57 years previously at the 1968 Summer Olympics in Mexico. The time placed her ninth on the global all-time under-18 toplist for 100 metres and also placed her equal-fourth with Sally Pearson on the Australian senior all-time list, only 0.04 seconds behind national record holder Torrie Lewis: only Lewis (11.10 s), Melissa Breen (11.11 s) and Melinda Gainsford-Taylor (11.12 s) having run quicker. Boyle and O'Brien met on ABC Radio after the race with Boyle congratulating O'Brien for breaking her 57 year-old record. O'Brien also won the Australian under-18 national 200 metres title at the same championships, held in Perth, Western Australia, in a time of 23.37 seconds.

On 11 April 2025, she qualified for the open 100 metres semi-finals, competing against senior athletes, at the Australian Athletics Championships in Perth, running 11.31 seconds. The following day, she finished runner-up to Torrie Lewis in the final in a photo-finish, with both athletes credited with a time of 11.24 seconds.

She was selected for the Australian team for the 2025 World Athletics Championships in Tokyo, Japan.

== Personal life ==
She is from Perth, Western Australia. She attended Perth College.
