= Nyasha Harris =

Belizean sprinter (born 2007)

Personal information
- Nationality: Belizean
- Born: 29 June 2007 (age 19)

Sport
- Sport: Athletics
- Event: Sprint

Achievements and titles
- Personal bests: 100m: 11.86 (Quetzaltenango, 2025); 200m: 25.37 (San Salvador, 2025)

Nyasha Harris (born 29 June 2007) is a Belizean sprinter. She competed in the women's 100 metres at the 2025 World Athletics Championships.

== Biography ==
=== Early career ===
Harris is from a family of athletes, with both her parents and her aunt all competing in track and field. She attended Saint Catherine Academy in Belize City. Having studied Business Entrepreneurship she trained primarily at the Marion Jones Sports Complex in Belize City, she was a member of ten Belizean U18 sprint relay team which won the gold medal at the CADICA U18 Athletics Championships in Guatemala in 2023, but suffered a muscle injury in 2024 which ruled her out of competing in the first half of 2024.

Harris qualified for the final of the 100 metres race at the 2024 CODICADER Games in San Salvador, El Salvador, before winning the event in a time of 12.31 seconds, at the age of 17 years-old. She also finished in second place overall in the 200 metres race at the Games. In November 2024, she won the U18 100m and 200m at the Copa Revolución in Playa del Carmen, Mexico.

=== 2025: World championships debut ===
In February 2025, she won four gold events at the ATLIB Track and Field Championships, including becoming national champion in the 100 metres, 200 metres, and high jump. She then won the U20 100 metres and 200 metres races at the Second Athletics Cup 2025, in Mérida, Yucatán in Mexico.

Harris won the gold medal in the 100 metres and the bronze medal in the 200 metres at the CADICA Central American Athletics U20 Championships in San Salvador, El Salvador in June 2025, running the 100m in 12.04 seconds and the 200m in 22.45 seconds. She later anchored the Belizean U20 girls relay team in the 4 × 100 metres relay to win the silver medal in 51.35 seconds.

She competed in the women's 100 metres at the 2025 World Athletics Championships in Tokyo, Japan, in September 2025, running 12.25 seconds without advancing to the semi-finals. The following month, she lowered her personal best to 11.86 seconds for the 100 metres, running into a headwind (-1.1 m/s).

In July 2026, she competed in the 100 metres at the 2026 Commonwealth Games. She also competed in the 200 metres at the women's 200 metres at the Games in Glasgow, Scotland.
