= Viwe Jingqi =

South African athlete (born 2005)

Personal information
- Nationality: South African
- Born: 17 February 2005 (age 21)

Sport
- Sport: Athletics
- Event: Sprint

Achievements and titles
- Personal best(s): 100m: 11.22 (Potchefstroom, 2022); 200m: 22.96 (Pretoria, 2024)

Viwe Jingqi (born 17 February 2005) is a South African track and field athlete. In 2024 she became South African national champion over 100 metres.

== Early life ==
Born in Engcobo, a town in the Eastern Cape to her mother Nothando and father Zweledinga, she attended TuksSport High School in Pretoria. Her older brother Vukile died in a car accident in 2021.

== Career ==
She trained at the University of Pretoria before with her sprint coach Paul Gorries at North-West University, she was South African U18 champion over both 100 metres and 200 metres in 2022. In August 2022, as a 17-year-old, she qualified for both the 100m and 200m finals at the 2022 World Athletics U20 Championships in Cali, Colombia. The year before previously, aged only 16, she had progressed to the 200m semifinals at the 2021 World Athletics U20 Championships in Nairobi, Kenya.

In 2022, she was nominated for South African Junior Athlete of the Year. She suffered an illness and injury-hit 2023, including the forced removal of her appendix, which limited her capacity for racing.

She won the 100 metres at the South African National championships in April 2024 in a time of 11.23 seconds.

In March 2025, she won the U23 100m title at the Athletics South Africa Junior Championships in Cape Town, in a time of 11.60 seconds.

In March 2026, she ran 11.48 seconds and won the U23 title over 100 m at the ASA age-group championships. The following month, she had a second place finish at the Senior South African championships, recording the same time of 11.55 seconds as the victorious defending champion Joviale Mbisha. The following month at the 2026 World Athletics Relays in Botswana, she ran as part of the South African women 4 x 100 metres relay team which set a new national record on the opening day on 2 May, running alongside Mbisha, Kayla la Grange and Gabriella Marais their time of 43.22 seconds surpassed the previous best set 26 years previously.
