= Joviale Mbisha =

South African sprinter (born 2000)

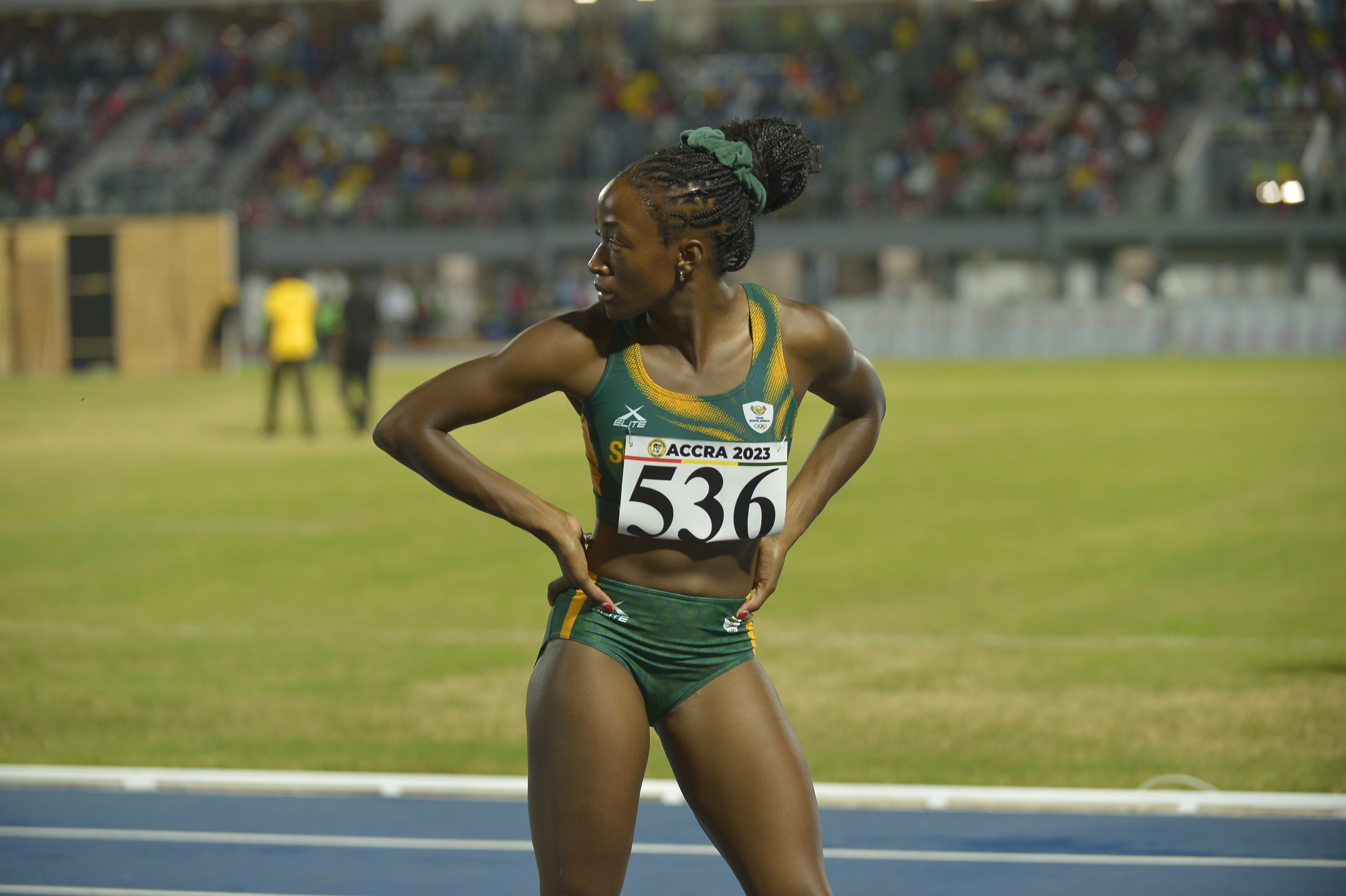
- Mbisha in 2023

Personal information
- Born: 31 October 2000 (age 25)
- Education: University of Johannesburg

Sport
- Sport: Athletics
- Event(s): 100 m, 200 m
- Club: Central Guateng Athletics

Achievements and titles
- Personal best(s): 60m: 7.51 (2024); 100m: 11.48 (2025); 200m: 23.56 (2024); 400m: 55.84 (2026)
Medal record
Women's athletics
Representing South Africa
World University Games
Bronze medal – third place	2021 Chengdu	4×100 m

Joviale Mbisha (born 31 October 2000) is a South African sprinter. She won the South African national title over 100 metres in 2025 and 2026.

== Biography ==
A student at the University of the Free State before transferring to the University of Johannesburg in August 2022 to study for an Honours degree in communication, she was named the UJ sportswoman of the year in 2023. Mbisha was a bronze medalist with the South African women's 4 x 100 metres relay team at the delayed 2021 Summer World University Games held in Chengdu, China in August 2023.

A member of Central Gauteng Athletics, Mbisha won the South African Athletics Championships over 100 metres in April 2025, running 11.48 seconds in Potchefstroom. She also placed second over 200 metres at the championships, running 23.59 seconds to finish runner-up to Rume Burger.

Mbisha retained her 100 metres title in April 2026, winning in 11.55 seconds, edging ahead of Viwe Jingqi who recorded the same time. She was selected for the South African team to compete at the 2026 World Athletics Relays in Gaborone, Botswana. She was part of the South African women 4 x 100 metres relay team which set a new national record on the opening day at the World Relays on 2 May, alongside Jingqi, Kayla La Grange, and Gabriella Marais they ran 43.22 seconds, surpassing the previous best set 26 years previously.
