= Cameron Gray =

Cameron Gray may refer to:

- Cameron Gray (footballer)
- Cameron Gray (swimmer)
