= Ethan Nairne =

British judoka (born 2002)

Personal information
- Born: 8 June 2002 (age 24) Weston-super-Mare, England
- Occupation: Judoka

Sport
- Country: Great Britain
- Sport: Judo
- Weight class: ‍–‍73 kg

Achievements and titles
- World Champ.: R16 (2026)
- European Champ.: 7th (2026)
- Commonwealth Games: (gold) (2026)
Medal record
Men's judo
Representing Great Britain
IJF Grand Prix
Gold medal – first place	2026 Linz	‍–‍73 kg
Representing England
Commonwealth Games
Gold medal – first place	2026 Glasgow	‍–‍73 kg

Profile at external databases
- IJF: 48915
- JudoInside.com: 102689
- Updated on 6 October 2026

Ethan Nairne (born 8 June 2002) is a British judoka. He won the gold medal at the 2026 Commonwealth Games in the 73 kg division.

== Career ==
From Kewstoke, he was educated in Worle and trained at Weston Judo Club. He was British national champion at a junior level. His sister Lele Nairne is also an international judoka with the pair later training at the Bradley Stoke Judo Club in Bristol, under coach Pete Douglas.

In March 2026, Nairne won gold at the Upper Austria Grand Prix, becoming the first British man to claim a Grand Prix title for five years. On 1 August, Nairne won the gold medal reorienting England at the 2026 Commonwealth Games in the 73kg division, defeating compatriot Benjamin Levy by Yuko in the final.
