= Thewbelle Philp =

Australian athlete (born 2008)

Personal information
- Nickname: Chewy
- Nationality: Australian
- Born: 5 April 2008 (age 17)
- Height: 1.57 m (5 ft 2 in)

Sport
- Sport: Athletics
- Event: Sprint

Thewbelle Philp (born 5 April 2008) is an Australian track and field athlete who competes as a sprinter.

== Early life ==
Philp was raised on the Gold Coast by an Indigenous Australian (Minjungbal) father and a Filipino mother. She first started training in athletics at the age of five but shortly after quit the sport until the age of 10 when she was inspired to return to athletics after witnessing the 2018 Commonwealth Games in her hometown of the Gold Coast.

== Career ==
At 16 years of age, Philp was selected to represent Australia at the 2024 World Athletics U20 Championships in Lima, Peru, where she helped her country qualify for the 4 × 100 m relay final. In February 2025, Philp set a new Australian under-20 60 metre record when she ran 7.30 seconds at the 2025 Australian Short Track Athletics Championships. At the 2025 Australian All Schools Athletics Championships, she clocked an impressive 11.38s in the 100m final and also impressed in the 200m competition with a time of 23.40s.

== Personal bests ==
Event	PB	Wind	Venue	Date
60m	7.24 s	+0.9	Melbourne, Australia	7 February 2026
100 m	11.35 s	+1.7	Perth, Australia	8 April 2025
200 m	23.21 s	+1.0	Nathan, Brisbane, Australia	23 November 2024
4x100m	43.15 s	-	Guangzhou, China	10 May 2025
