= Mia Gross =

Australian sprinter (born 2001)

Personal information
- Nationality: Australian
- Born: 18 April 2001 (age 25) Geelong, Victoria
- Height: 1.80 m (5 ft 11 in)

Sport
- Sport: Athletics
- Event: Sprint

Achievements and titles
- Personal bests: 100m: 11.33 (Perth, 2025); 200m: 22.73 (Fukuroi, 2025); 400m: 51.88 (Melbourne, 2026)
Medal record
Women's athletics
Representing Australia
Commonwealth Games
Bronze medal – third place	2022 Birmingham	4×100m relay
Oceania Championships
Gold medal – first place	2026 Darwin	200 m
Silver medal – second place	2024 Suva	200 m
Silver medal – second place	2026 Darwin	400 m

Mia Gross (born 18 April 2001) is an Australian track and field athlete who competes in sprint events. She was junior Australian champion in the 100m and 200m in both 2018 and 2019. As a senior, Gross was part of the Australian sprint relay team that finished third at the Commonwealth Games in 2022. She competed at the 2024 Summer Olympics and won the gold medal over 200 metres at the 2026 Oceania Athletics Championships.

== Early life ==
Growing up in Geelong, Gross took part in many sports including football, netball, volleyball, hockey and cricket, but focused ultimately on athletics.

== Career ==
=== Junior career ===
As a junior, Gross was entered into the 2017 Commonwealth Youth Games held in Nassau, Bahamas. At the Games however, Gross had her wrist broken following an incident in which another competitor knocked her over by jogging into her lane when she was training. Gross competed in the 100m despite the freshly broken wrist, and against medical advice, but missed out on a place in the final by 0.02 seconds.

Gross reached the semi-finals at the 2018 IAAF World U20 Championships in Tampere, Finland in the 200m, and was part of an Australian relay team which reached the final of the 4x100m relay and finished in a national and Oceanian under-20 record time of 44.78 seconds. In 2018, and 2019, Gross won National U20 100m and 200m titles.

=== 2022:Commonwealth Games medalist ===
Competing at the senior level, Gross was selected to be a member of the Australian team for the 2022 Commonwealth Games as part of the 4x100m relay team that qualified through to the final and ultimately finished third.

Gross ran in the Diamond League meeting in Lausanne in June 2023, competing in the 4x100m relay and setting a new season's best 100m time of 11.63s for the 100m in winning the women's C race. The following week Gross set a new personal best in the 200 metres, running 23.68s in Bulle, Switzerland.

=== 2024: Olympic Games debut ===
In March 2024, she lowered her 200 metres personal best to 23.16 seconds as she won the NSW State Championship title ahead of Ella Connolly in Sydney. On 23 March 2024, she lowered her 100m personal best to 11.38 seconds at the Sydney Track Classic. She won silver in the 200 metres at the Australian Athletics Championships in Adelaide in April 2024, running 23.39 seconds. On 3 May 2024, she lowered her 200m personal best to 23.15, winning at the Shizuoka International Athletics Meet in Fukuroi, Japan. In June 2024, she lowered her 200m personal best to 22.81 in Sestriere. At the same event she ran a wind-assisted 11.18 for the 100m. She competed at the 2024 Summer Olympics in Paris over 200 metres.

=== 2025: World Championships debut ===
She was runner-up at the Perth Classic over 100 metres in 11.20 seconds (+3.00) on 1 March 2025. She lowered her personal best to a wind-legal 11.33 seconds for the 100 metres during the heats of the Australian Athletics Championships in Perth on 11 April 2025. In the final, she finished in fifth place in a time of 11.35 seconds. The following day, she finished fourth in the 200 metres race at the championship, running 23.05 on 13 April 2025. She competed at the 2025 World Athletics Relays in China in the Women's 4 × 400 metres relay in May 2025, helping the team qualify for the 2025 World Championships. She set a new personal best for the 200 metres of 22.73 seconds winning the Shizuoka International Athletics Meet in Japan in May 2025.

In September 2025, she competed in the 200 metres at the 2025 World Championships in Tokyo, Japan. She also ran on the opening day in the mixed 4 × 400 metres relay, and later ran in the women's 4 x 400 metres relay.

=== 2026 ===
On 28 February 2026, Gross won the 100 metres at the Hobart Track Classic. The following month, Gross set a new personal best of 51.88 seconds for the 400 metres in Melbourne, winning the Victorian State title. Competing at the 2026 Maurie Plant Meet she was runner-up in the 200 metres to Monique Hanlon in 23.71 seconds. She was runner-up in 52.13 seconds in the 400 m at the 2026 Australian Championships.

Competing at the 2026 World Athletics Relays in Botswana, Gross was part of the Australian mixed 4 x 400 metres relay team which set an Oceanian record of 3:10.57 on the opening day. At the 2026 Oceania Athletics Championships in Darwin later that month, Gross won the silver medal in the 400 metres final behind Ellie Beer and ahead of Alice Dixon in an Australian sweep of the medals. Later at the championships, she won the gold medal in the 200 metres ahead of Lakara Stallan. She was a semi-finalist in the 200 metres at the 2026 Commonwealth Games in Glasgow, Scotland. Gross also ran in the mixed 4 × 400 m relay at the Games.

== Personal life ==
Gross attended Geelong Grammar School. Gross is the cousin of triathlete Jo King. Gross also works as a personal trainer at a gym in Melbourne. Her sister Olivia is a pole-vaulter.
