= Beyoncé Defreitas =

British Virgin Islands athlete

Personal information
- Full name: Beyoncé Anysia Defreitas
- Nationality: British Virgin Islands
- Born: 9 March 2001 (age 25)

Sport
- Sport: Athletics
- Event: Sprint

Achievements and titles
- Personal bests: 60m: 7.26 (Nanjing, 2025); 100m: 11.16 (Winter Garden, 2025); 200m: 22.81 (Tampa, 2023)
Medal record
Women's athletics
Representing British Virgin Islands
Central American and Caribbean Games
Silver medal – second place	2026 Santo Domingo	200 m
NACAC U23 Championships
Silver medal – second place	2023 San Jose	200 m
Bronze medal – third place	2023 San Jose	100 m
Commonwealth Youth Games
Silver medal – second place	2017 Nassau	200m

Beyoncé Anysia Defreitas (born 9 March 2001) is a track and field athlete from the British Virgin Islands who competes as a sprinter.

== Early life ==
She attended Elmore Stoutt High School in Tortola, British Virgin Islands. She studied at the University of Central Florida.

== Career ==
She was selected for the British Virgin Islands team at age-group levels at the 2014 and 2018 CARIFTA Games. She was a silver medalist in the 200 metres at the 2017 Commonwealth Youth Games, to become the first female medalist at the Games for her nation. She became a member of Sprint Tech Track Club in Clermont, Florida.

Alongside Kyron McMaster, she was one of only two athletes from the British Virgin Islands selected for the 2022 World Athletics Championships in Eugene, Oregon, where she raced in the 200 metres. She reached the semifinals of the 200 metres at the 2022 Commonwealth Games in Birmingham, England. Along with Rikkoi Brathwaite, she had been a flag bearer for her country in the opening ceremony.

She was selected for the 2023 Central American and Caribbean Games in San Salvador, El Salvador. She was a silver medalist in the 200 metres and a bronze medalist in the 100 metres at the 2023 NACAC U23 Championships in Costa Rica.

She ran a 7.26 seconds personal best and reached the semi-finals of the 60 metres at the 2025 World Athletics Indoor Championships in Nanjing. In the semi-final she ran 7.38 seconds and did not proceed to the final. In September 2025, she competed in the 200 metres at the 2025 World Championships in Tokyo, Japan.

In July 2026, she was a semi-finalist competing in the 100 metres at the 2026 Commonwealth Games in Glasgow, Scotland. In August, she won the silver medal in the 200 metres at the 2026 CAC Games in Santo Domingo, Dominican Republic.
