= Judo at the 2018 Asian Games – Mixed team =

Judo competition

Mixed team at the 2018 Asian Games
- Venue: Jakarta Convention Center
- Date: 1 September 2018
- Competitors: 109 from 10 nations

Medalists
gold medal	Japan; Masashi Ebinuma, Shohei Ono, Mashu Baker, Yusuke Kobayashi, Kokoro Kageura, Takeshi Ojitani, Haruka Funakubo, Momo Tamaoki, Saki Niizoe, Shiho Tanaka, Akira Sone, Sara Yamamoto
silver medal	Kazakhstan; Zhansay Smagulov, Yeldos Zhumakanov, Islam Bozbayev, Didar Khamza, Yerassyl Kazhybayev, Sanzhar Zhabborov, Kamshat Karassaikyzy, Sevara Nishanbayeva, Zere Bektaskyzy, Iolanta Berdybekova, Gulzhan Issanova, Zarina Raifova
bronze medal	South Korea; Ahn Joon-sung, An Chang-rim, Gwak Dong-han, Lee Jae-yong, Cho Gu-ham, Kim Sung-min, Kim Jan-di, Kwon You-jeong, Jeong Hye-jin, Kim Seong-yeon, Han Mi-jin, Kim Min-jeong
bronze medal	China; Bayan Delihei, Qing Daga, Bu Hebilige, Xie Yadong, Qiu Shangao, Shen Zhuhong, Feng Xuemei, Zhang Wen, Liu Hongyan, Zhu Ya, Jiang Yanan, Wang Yan

The mixed team competition at the 2018 Asian Games in Jakarta was held on 1 September at the Jakarta Convention Center Assembly Hall.

== Schedule ==
All times are Western Indonesia Time (UTC+07:00)

Date	Time	Event
Friday, 1 Saturday 2018	09:00	Elimination round of 16
Friday, 1 Saturday 2018	09:00	Quarterfinals
Friday, 1 Saturday 2018	09:00	Repechage
Friday, 1 Saturday 2018	09:00	Semifinals
Friday, 1 Saturday 2018	16:00	Finals

== Results ==
=== Bracket ===
==== Main ====
Elimination round of 16
Chinese Taipei	1
South Korea	4
India	4
Nepal	1

Quarterfinals
South Korea	3
Japan	3
Mongolia	2
China	4
Uzbekistan	4
Indonesia	0
Kazakhstan	4
India	0

Semifinals
Japan	4
China	0
Uzbekistan	3
Kazakhstan	4

Gold medal contest
Japan	4
Kazakhstan	0

==== Repechage ====
Repechage
South Korea
Bye
Indonesia	0
India	4

Bronze medal contests
South Korea	4
Uzbekistan	0
India	0
China	4

=== Elimination round of 16 ===
Chinese Taipei	1–4	South Korea

Lien Chen-ling	10–00	Kim Jan-di	Women's 57 kg
Huang Sheng-ting	00–10	Ahn Joon-sung	Men's 73 kg
Huang Yi-ting	00–10	Jeong Hye-jin	Women's 70 kg
Shen Chao-en	00–10	Lee Jae-yong	Men's 90 kg
Tsai Jia-wen	00–10	Han Mi-jin	Women's +70 kg

India	4–1	Nepal

Kalpana Devi Thoudam	11–00	Devika Khadka	Women's 57 kg
Vijay Kumar Yadav	10–00	Indra Bahadur Shresta	Men's 73 kg
Garima Chaudhary	00–10	Manita Shrestha Pradhan	Women's 70 kg
Harshdeep Singh Brar	10–00	Shree Ram Makaju	Men's 90 kg
Rajwinder Kaur	10–00	Punam Shrestha	Women's +70 kg

=== Quarterfinals ===
South Korea	3^{21}–3^{30}	Japan

Kwon You-jeong	00–10	Momo Tamaoki	Women's 57 kg
An Chang-rim	10–00	Masashi Ebinuma	Men's 73 kg
Jeong Hye-jin	00–10	Saki Niizoe	Women's 70 kg
Gwak Dong-han	01–00	Yusuke Kobayashi	Men's 90 kg
Kim Min-jeong	10–00	Sara Yamamoto	Women's +70 kg
Kim Sung-min	00–10	Kokoro Kageura	Men's +90 kg

Mongolia	2–4	China

Dorjsürengiin Sumiyaa	00–01	Zhang Wen	Women's 57 kg
Tsend-Ochiryn Tsogtbaatar	10–00	Qing Daga	Men's 73 kg
Tsend-Ayuushiin Naranjargal	10–00	Liu Hongyan	Women's 70 kg
Erdenekhüügiin Mönkhjargal	00–10	Bu Hebilige	Men's 90 kg
Battulgyn Mönkhtuyaa	00–10	Jiang Yanan	Women's +70 kg
Ölziibayaryn Düürenbayar	00–11	Shen Zhuhong	Men's +90 kg

Uzbekistan	4–0	Indonesia

Amangul Allanazarova	01–00	Amanah Nur Istiqomah	Women's 57 kg
Shakhram Ahadov	11–00	Budi Prasetiyo	Men's 73 kg
Gulnoza Matniyazova	10–00	Ardelia Yuli Fradivtha	Women's 70 kg
Shakhzodbek Sabirov	11–00	Horas Manurung	Men's 90 kg

Kazakhstan	4–0	India

Sevara Nishanbayeva	10–00	Kalpana Devi Thoudam	Women's 57 kg
Zhansay Smagulov	10–00	Vijay Kumar Yadav	Men's 73 kg
Zere Bektaskyzy	10–00	Garima Chaudhary	Women's 70 kg
Islam Bozbayev	10–00	Harshdeep Singh Brar	Men's 90 kg

=== Repechage ===
Indonesia	0–4	India

Amanah Nur Istiqomah	00–10	Kalpana Devi Thoudam	Women's 57 kg
Aditya Wahyudi	00–10	Vijay Kumar Yadav	Men's 73 kg
Ardelia Yuli Fradivtha	00–10	Garima Chaudhary	Women's 70 kg
Gerard Christopher George	00–11	Harshdeep Singh Brar	Men's 90 kg

=== Semifinals ===
Japan	4–0	China

Haruka Funakubo	10–00	Zhang Wen	Women's 57 kg
Masashi Ebinuma	11–00	Bayan Delihei	Men's 73 kg
Shiho Tanaka	10–00	Liu Hongyan	Women's 70 kg
Yusuke Kobayashi	10–00	Bu Hebilige	Men's 90 kg

Uzbekistan	3–4	Kazakhstan

Amangul Allanazarova	00–01	Sevara Nishanbayeva	Women's 57 kg
Giyosjon Boboev	01–00	Zhansay Smagulov	Men's 73 kg
Gulnoza Matniyazova	10–00	Zere Bektaskyzy	Women's 70 kg
Shakhzodbek Sabirov	00–10	Islam Bozbayev	Men's 90 kg
Rinata Ilmatova	00–10	Gulzhan Issanova	Women's +70 kg
Bekmurod Oltiboev	10–00	Yerassyl Kazhybayev	Men's +90 kg
Amangul Allanazarova	00–10	Sevara Nishanbayeva	Women's 57 kg

=== Bronze medal contests ===
South Korea	4–0	Uzbekistan

Kwon You-jeong	10–00	Gulnoza Ziyaeva	Women's 57 kg
An Chang-rim	01–00	Giyosjon Boboev	Men's 73 kg
Kim Seong-yeon	01–00	Gulnoza Matniyazova	Women's 70 kg
Gwak Dong-han	10–00	Shakhzodbek Sabirov	Men's 90 kg

India	0–4	China

Kalpana Devi Thoudam	00–01	Zhang Wen	Women's 57 kg
Vijay Kumar Yadav	00–10	Qing Daga	Men's 73 kg
Garima Chaudhary	00–10	Liu Hongyan	Women's 70 kg
Harshdeep Singh Brar	00–10	Bu Hebilige	Men's 90 kg

=== Gold medal contest ===
Japan	4–0	Kazakhstan

Haruka Funakubo	10–00	Sevara Nishanbayeva	Women's 57 kg
Masashi Ebinuma	01–00	Zhansay Smagulov	Men's 73 kg
Shiho Tanaka	10–00	Zere Bektaskyzy	Women's 70 kg
Yusuke Kobayashi	01–00	Islam Bozbayev	Men's 90 kg

== Non-participating athletes ==
- Qiu Shangao (CHN)
- Xie Yadong (CHN)
- Feng Xuemei (CHN)
- Wang Yan (CHN)
- Zhu Ya (CHN)
- Toga Pramandita (INA)
- Gede Ganding Kalbu Soethama (INA)
- Ni Kadek Anny Pandini (INA)
- Vika Irma Safitri (INA)
- Dewa Ayu Mira Widari (INA)
- Hevrilia Windawati (INA)
- Avtar Singh (IND)
- Mashu Baker (JPN)
- Takeshi Ojitani (JPN)
- Shohei Ono (JPN)
- Akira Sone (JPN)
- Didar Khamza (KAZ)
- Sanzhar Zhabborov (KAZ)
- Yeldos Zhumakanov (KAZ)
- Iolanta Berdybekova (KAZ)
- Kamshat Karassaikyzy (KAZ)
- Zarina Raifova (KAZ)
- Cho Gu-ham (KOR)
- Gantulgyn Altanbagana (MGL)
- Narankhüügiin Khadbaatar (MGL)
- Naidangiin Tüvshinbayar (MGL)
- Lkhagvatogoogiin Enkhriilen (MGL)
- Erdenebilegiin Gandiimaa (MGL)
- Baldorjyn Möngönchimeg (MGL)
- Sanjit Dangol (NEP)
- Ravin Shrestha (NEP)
- Phupu Lhamu Khatri (NEP)
- Chang Wei-cheng (TPE)
- Chen Sheng-min (TPE)
- Lu Guan-zhi (TPE)
- Yang Yung-wei (TPE)
- Chen Chin-ying (TPE)
- Chen Yun-ting (TPE)
- Gao Jun-ying (TPE)
- Sharofiddin Boltaboev (UZB)
- Sherali Juraev (UZB)
- Nodira Yuldasheva (UZB)
