= 2018 World Judo Championships – Men's 73 kg =

Judo competition

Judo Men's 73 kg at the 2018 World Judo Championships
- Venue: National Gymnastics Arena
- Location: Baku, Azerbaijan
- Dates: 22 September
- Competitors: 82 from 63 nations
- Total prize money: 57,000€

Medalists
gold medal	An Chang-rim (1st title)	South Korea
silver medal	Soichi Hashimoto	Japan
bronze medal	Mohammad Mohammadi	Iran
bronze medal	Hidayat Heydarov	Azerbaijan

Competition at external databases
- Links: IJF • JudoInside

The Men's 73 kg competition at the 2018 World Judo Championships was held on 22 September 2018.

== Results ==
=== Finals ===
Semi-finals
(Japan) Soichi Hashimoto	10
(Azerbaijan) Hidayat Heydarov	00
(South Korea) An Chang-rim	11
(Iran) Mohammad Mohammadi	00

Final
(Japan) Soichi Hashimoto	00
(South Korea) An Chang-rim	10

=== Repechage ===
Repechage
(Kazakhstan) Zhansay Smagulov	00
(Mongolia) Ganbaataryn Odbayar	01

Third place
(Mongolia) Ganbaataryn Odbayar	00
(Iran) Mohammad Mohammadi	10

Repechage
(Mongolia) Tsend-Ochiryn Tsogtbaatar	10
(Georgia (country)) Lasha Shavdatuashvili	00

Third place
(Mongolia) Tsend-Ochiryn Tsogtbaatar	00
(Azerbaijan) Hidayat Heydarov	01

=== Pool A ===
Preliminary round fights

	Score	
Nicholas Delpopolo (United States)	11–00	(Mozambique) Ayton Siquir
Lukas Reiter (Austria)	01–11	(Cuba) Magdiel Estrada
Claudio Nunes Dos Santos (Luxembourg)	00–11	(Slovenia) Martin Hojak
Sam van't Westende (Netherlands)	00–01	(Hungary) Miklós Ungvári
Alonso Wong (Peru)	00–01	(Switzerland) Nils Stump

First round
(Japan) Soichi Hashimoto	10
(Botswana) Tirelo Lekoko	00
(The Gambia) Faye Njie	00
(United States) Nicholas Delpopolo	10
(Cuba) Magdiel Estrada	10
(Romania) Alexandru Raicu	00
(France) Guillaume Chaine	01
(Slovenia) Martin Hojak	00
(Kosovo) Akil Gjakova	10
(Cape Verde) Magner Mendes	00
(Canada) Antoine Bouchard	00
(Hungary) Miklós Ungvári	01
(Morocco) Safouane Boutit	00
(Montenegro) Nikola Gardašević	10
(Kazakhstan) Zhansay Smagulov	11
(Switzerland) Nils Stump	00

Second round
(Japan) Soichi Hashimoto	01
(United States) Nicholas Delpopolo	00
(Cuba) Magdiel Estrada	00
(France) Guillaume Chaine	11
(Kosovo) Akil Gjakova	10
(Hungary) Miklós Ungvári	00
(Montenegro) Nikola Gardašević	00
(Kazakhstan) Zhansay Smagulov	10

Third round
(Japan) Soichi Hashimoto	10
(France) Guillaume Chaine	00
(Kosovo) Akil Gjakova	00
(Kazakhstan) Zhansay Smagulov	10

Quarterfinals
(Japan) Soichi Hashimoto	10
(Kazakhstan) Zhansay Smagulov	00

=== Pool B ===
Preliminary round fights

	Score	
Anthony Zingg (Germany)	10–00	(Belgium) Dirk Van Tichelt
Keisei Nakano (Philippines)	00–10	(Moldova) Victor Sterpu
Lee Kwok Wing (Hong Kong)	00–10	(Yemen) Ahmed Ayash
Lucas Diallo (Burkina Faso)	00–10	(Tajikistan) Behruzi Khojazoda

First round
(Mongolia) Ganbaataryn Odbayar	10
(Germany) Anthony Zingg	00
(Greece) Georgios Azoidis	00
(Uzbekistan) Khikmatillokh Turaev	11
(Moldova) Victor Sterpu	10
(Afghanistan) Mod Reshad Aryan	00
(South Korea) Ahn Joon-sung	10
(Portugal) Jorge Fernandes	00
(Azerbaijan) Hidayat Heydarov	11
(Iraq) Sajjad Sehen	00
(Yemen) Ahmed Ayash	00
(Monaco) Cédric Bessi	10
(China) Qing Daga	00
(Poland) Michał Bartusik	10
(Tajikistan) Behruzi Khojazoda	10
(Australia) Calvin Knoester	00

Second round
(Mongolia) Ganbaataryn Odbayar	10
(Uzbekistan) Khikmatillokh Turaev	01
(Moldova) Victor Sterpu	00
(South Korea) Ahn Joon-sung	10
(Azerbaijan) Hidayat Heydarov	10
(Monaco) Cédric Bessi	00
(Poland) Michał Bartusik	00
(Tajikistan) Behruzi Khojazoda	10

Third round
(Mongolia) Ganbaataryn Odbayar	10
(South Korea) Ahn Joon-sung	00
(Azerbaijan) Hidayat Heydarov	01
(Tajikistan) Behruzi Khojazoda	00

Quarterfinals
(Mongolia) Ganbaataryn Odbayar	00
(Azerbaijan) Hidayat Heydarov	01

=== Pool C ===
Preliminary round fights

	Score	
Victor Scvortov (United Arab Emirates)	10–00	(Puerto Rico) Jeffrey Ruiz
Nuno Saraiva (Portugal)	11–00	(Italy) Fabio Basile
Jakub Ječmínek (Czech Republic)	10–00	(Canada) Arthur Margelidon
Alexander Turner (United States)	00–01	(Algeria) Fethi Nourine
Sulaiman Hamad (Saudi Arabia)	11–01	(Haiti) Philippe Metellus

First round
(Azerbaijan) Rustam Orujov	10
(Egypt) Mohamed Mohyeldin	00
(Poland) Wiktor Mrówczyński	00
(United Arab Emirates) Victor Scvortov	01
(Mongolia) Tsend-Ochiryn Tsogtbaatar	01
(Portugal) Nuno Saraiva	00
(Uzbekistan) Giyosjon Boboev	00
(Tajikistan) Somon Makhmadbekov	01
(South Korea) An Chang-rim	01
(Czech Republic) Jakub Ječmínek	00
(Montenegro) Nikola Gušić	00
(Algeria) Fethi Nourine	01
(Saudi Arabia) Sulaiman Hamad	00
(Hungary) Frigyes Szabó	10
(Ghana) Emmanuel Nartey	00
(Ukraine) Artem Khomula	10

Second round
(Azerbaijan) Rustam Orujov	10
(United Arab Emirates) Victor Scvortov	00
(Mongolia) Tsend-Ochiryn Tsogtbaatar	01
(Tajikistan) Somon Makhmadbekov	00
(South Korea) An Chang-rim	10
(Algeria) Fethi Nourine	00
(Hungary) Frigyes Szabó	00
(Ukraine) Artem Khomula	01

Third round
(Azerbaijan) Rustam Orujov	00
(Mongolia) Tsend-Ochiryn Tsogtbaatar	01
(South Korea) An Chang-rim	10
(Ukraine) Artem Khomula	00

Quarterfinals
(Mongolia) Tsend-Ochiryn Tsogtbaatar	00
(South Korea) An Chang-rim	10

=== Pool D ===
Preliminary round fights

	Score	
Kim Chol-gwang (North Korea)	00–11	(Iran) Mohammad Mohammadi
Christopher Wagner (Austria)	00–10	(Germany) Igor Wandtke
Mamadou Samba Bah (Guinea)	00–11	(China) Fang Hongyuan
Leider Navarro (Colombia)	11–00	(Jordan) Eyal Younis

First round
(Sweden) Tommy Macias	10
(Israel) Tohar Butbul	00
(Iran) Mohammad Mohammadi	10
(Kyrgyzstan) Ishen Amanov	00
(Moldova) Iulian Peaticovschi	10
(Cyprus) Roudolf Kourtidis	01
(Germany) Igor Wandtke	10
(Botswana) Thato Lebang	00
(Georgia (country)) Lasha Shavdatuashvili	10
(Qatar) Khalil Rebahi	00
(Belarus) Vadzim Shoka	01
(China) Fang Hongyuan	00
(France) Benjamin Axus	10
(Kazakhstan) Bekadil Shaimerdenov	00
(Colombia) Leider Navarro	10
(Switzerland) Timo Allemann	01

Second round
(Sweden) Tommy Macias	00
(Iran) Mohammad Mohammadi	01
(Moldova) Iulian Peaticovschi	10
(Germany) Igor Wandtke	00
(Georgia (country)) Lasha Shavdatuashvili	10
(Belarus) Vadzim Shoka	00
(France) Benjamin Axus	10
(Colombia) Leider Navarro	00

Third round
(Iran) Mohammad Mohammadi	10
(Moldova) Iulian Peaticovschi	00
(Georgia (country)) Lasha Shavdatuashvili	01
(France) Benjamin Axus	00

Quarterfinals
(Iran) Mohammad Mohammadi	10
(Georgia (country)) Lasha Shavdatuashvili	00

== Prize money ==
The sums listed bring the total prizes awarded to 57,000€ for the individual event.

Medal	Total	Judoka	Coach
Gold	26,000€	20,800€	5,200€
Silver	15,000€	12,000€	3,000€
Bronze	8,000€	6,400€	1,600€
