= Jack Yonezuka =

American judoka (born 2003)

Personal information
- Born: 20 May 2003 (age 23)
- Occupation: Judoka

Sport
- Country: United States
- Sport: Judo
- Weight class: ‍–‍73 kg

Achievements and titles
- Olympic Games: R32 (2024)
- World Champ.: R16 (2023, 2025, 2026)
- Pan American Champ.: (gold) (2025)
Medal record
Men's judo
Representing United States
Pan American Championships
Gold medal – first place	2025 Santiago	‍–‍73 kg
Silver medal – second place	2026 Panama City	‍–‍73 kg
IJF Grand Slam
Silver medal – second place	2026 Ulaanbaatar	‍–‍73 kg
IJF Grand Prix
Silver medal – second place	2026 Lima	‍–‍73 kg
Bronze medal – third place	2024 Linz	‍–‍73 kg
Bronze medal – third place	2026 Linz	‍–‍73 kg
World Juniors Championships
Silver medal – second place	2023 Odivelas	‍–‍73 kg
Bronze medal – third place	2022 Guayaquil	‍–‍73 kg
Junior Pan American Games
Silver medal – second place	2021 Cali Valle	‍–‍66 kg
Pan American Junior Championships
Silver medal – second place	2020 Guadalajara	‍–‍66 kg
Pan American Cadet Championships
Gold medal – first place	2020 Guadalajara	‍–‍66 kg

Profile at external databases
- IJF: 47189
- JudoInside.com: 124778
- Updated on 6 October 2026

Jack Yonezuka (born May 20, 2003) is an American judoka. He has competed and won silver in the 2021 Junior Pan American Games and Bronze in the 2022 World Judo Juniors Championships. He has also competed in the 2022 World Judo Championships. He was taught judo by his father, Nicolas Yonezuka and is the grandson of Yoshisada Yonezuka. Amongst his coaches are former competitor Colton Brown.

Raised in West Long Branch, New Jersey, Yonezuka graduated from Shore Regional High School in 2021. He is majoring in education at Brookdale Community College.

Yonezuka qualified for the 2024 Summer Olympics.
