= Judo at the 2018 Asian Games – Men's 73 kg =

Judo competition

Men's 73 kg at the 2018 Asian Games
- Venue: Jakarta Convention Center
- Date: 30 August 2018
- Competitors: 25 from 25 nations

Medalists
gold medal	Shohei Ono	Japan
silver medal	An Chang-rim	South Korea
bronze medal	Victor Scvortov	United Arab Emirates
bronze medal	Mohammad Mohammadi	Iran

The men's 73 kilograms (Lightweight) competition at the 2018 Asian Games in Jakarta was held on 30 August at the Jakarta Convention Center Assembly Hall.

== Schedule ==
All times are Western Indonesia Time (UTC+07:00)

Date	Time	Event
Thursday, 30 August 2018	09:00	Elimination round of 32
Thursday, 30 August 2018	09:00	Elimination round of 16
Thursday, 30 August 2018	09:00	Quarterfinals
Thursday, 30 August 2018	09:00	Repechage
Thursday, 30 August 2018	09:00	Semifinals
Thursday, 30 August 2018	16:00	Finals

== Results ==
=== Main bracket ===
==== Final ====
Gold medal contest
An Chang-rim (KOR)	00
Shohei Ono (JPN)	01

==== Top half ====
Elimination round of 32
Nguyễn Tấn Công (VIE)	11
Reshad Aryan (AFG)	00
Behruzi Khojazoda (TJK)	10
Lamphan Manivanh (LAO)	00
Khalil Rebahi (QAT)	01
Lee Kwok Wing (HKG)	00
Bektur Rysmambetov (KGZ)	10
Chamara Repiyallage (SRI)	01
Younis Ibrahim (JOR)	00
Keisei Nakano (PHI)	01

Elimination round of 16
An Chang-rim (KOR)	10
Nguyễn Tấn Công (VIE)	00
Behruzi Khojazoda (TJK)	10
Khalil Rebahi (QAT)	01
Tsend-Ochiryn Tsogtbaatar (MGL)	00
Bektur Rysmambetov (KGZ)	10
Mohammad Mohammadi (IRI)	10
Keisei Nakano (PHI)	00

Quarterfinals
An Chang-rim (KOR)	01
Behruzi Khojazoda (TJK)	00
Bektur Rysmambetov (KGZ)	00
Mohammad Mohammadi (IRI)	01

Semifinals
An Chang-rim (KOR)	10
Mohammad Mohammadi (IRI)	00

==== Bottom half ====
Elimination round of 32
Kim Chol-gwang (PRK)	10
Sajjad Ghanim (IRQ)	00
Qing Daga (CHN)	01
Iksan Apriyadi (INA)	00
Sun Panhga Wath (CAM)	00
Ahmed Ayash (YEM)	11
Sulaiman Hamad (KSA)	10
Sanjit Dangol (NEP)	00

Elimination round of 16
Zhansay Smagulov (KAZ)	00
Kim Chol-gwang (PRK)	10
Shohei Ono (JPN)	10
Qing Daga (CHN)	00
Giyosjon Boboev (UZB)	10
Ahmed Ayash (YEM)	00
Victor Scvortov (UAE)	11
Sulaiman Hamad (KSA)	00

Quarterfinals
Kim Chol-gwang (PRK)	00
Shohei Ono (JPN)	10
Giyosjon Boboev (UZB)	00
Victor Scvortov (UAE)	10

Semifinals
Shohei Ono (JPN)	10
Victor Scvortov (UAE)	00

=== Repechage ===
Repechage
Behruzi Khojazoda (TJK)	00
Bektur Rysmambetov (KGZ)	10
Kim Chol-gwang (PRK)	01
Giyosjon Boboev (UZB)	00

Bronze medal contests
Bektur Rysmambetov (KGZ)	00
Victor Scvortov (UAE)	10
Kim Chol-gwang (PRK)	00
Mohammad Mohammadi (IRI)	10
