= 2018 World Judo Championships – Women's 70 kg =

Judo Women's 70 kg at the 2018 World Judo Championships
- Venue: National Gymnastics Arena
- Location: Baku, Azerbaijan
- Dates: 24 September
- Competitors: 46 from 37 nations
- Total prize money: 57,000€

Medalists
gold medal	Chizuru Arai (2nd title)	Japan
silver medal	Marie-Ève Gahié	France
bronze medal	Yuri Alvear	Colombia
bronze medal	Yoko Ono	Japan

Competition at external databases
- Links: IJF • JudoInside

The Women's 70 kg competition at the 2018 World Judo Championships was held on 24 September 2018.

== Results ==
=== Finals ===
Semi-finals
(Puerto Rico) María Pérez	00
(Japan) Chizuru Arai	10
(France) Marie-Ève Gahié	10
(Morocco) Assmaa Niang	00

Final
(Japan) Chizuru Arai	10
(France) Marie-Ève Gahié	01

=== Repechage ===
Repechage
(Canada) Kelita Zupancic	01
(Colombia) Yuri Alvear	11

Third place
(Colombia) Yuri Alvear	10
(Morocco) Assmaa Niang	01

Repechage
(United Kingdom) Sally Conway	00
(Japan) Yoko Ono	01

Third place
(Japan) Yoko Ono	10
(Puerto Rico) María Pérez	00

=== Pool A ===
First round
(Uzbekistan) Shokhista Nazarova	00
(Poland) Daria Pogorzelec	01
(Belgium) Gabriella Willems	00
(Puerto Rico) María Pérez	01
(Italy) Carola Paissoni	10
(Burundi) Ange Ciella Niragira	00
(Spain) María Bernabéu	10
(Kazakhstan) Aelita Chsherbakova	00

Second round
(Brazil) Maria Portela	10
(Poland) Daria Pogorzelec	00
(Puerto Rico) María Pérez	10
(Bangladesh) Farina Khanom	00
(Canada) Kelita Zupancic	10
(Italy) Carola Paissoni	00
(South Korea) Jeong Hye-jin	00
(Spain) María Bernabéu	10

Third round
(Brazil) Maria Portela	00
(Puerto Rico) María Pérez	10
(Canada) Kelita Zupancic	10
(Spain) María Bernabéu	00

Quarterfinals
(Puerto Rico) María Pérez	01
(Canada) Kelita Zupancic	00

=== Pool B ===
First round
(Mongolia) Tsend-Ayuushiin Naranjargal	10
(Philippines) Mariya Takahashi	00
(Gabon) Karene Agono	00
(United Kingdom) Gemma Howell	01
(Germany) Giovanna Scoccimarro	10
(Hungary) Renáta Lőrincz	00

Second round
(Netherlands) Sanne van Dijke	11
(Mongolia) Tsend-Ayuushiin Naranjargal	00
(Colombia) Yuri Alvear	10
(Cameroon) Ayuk Arrey	00
(Japan) Chizuru Arai	10
(United Kingdom) Gemma Howell	00
(Germany) Giovanna Scoccimarro	10
(Greece) Elisavet Teltsidou	00

Third round
(Netherlands) Sanne van Dijke	00
(Colombia) Yuri Alvear	10
(Japan) Chizuru Arai	01
(Germany) Giovanna Scoccimarro	00

Quarterfinals
(Colombia) Yuri Alvear	00
(Japan) Chizuru Arai	01

=== Pool C ===
First round
(Russia) Alena Prokopenko	01
(Netherlands) Hilde Jager	00
(Canada) Emily Burt	10
(Hungary) Szabina Gercsák	00
(Republic of Ireland) Megan Fletcher	10
(Australia) Aoife Coughlan	00

Second round
(France) Marie-Ève Gahié	10
(Russia) Alena Prokopenko	00
(Canada) Emily Burt	10
(United States) Chantal Wright	00
(United Kingdom) Sally Conway	01
(Venezuela) Elvismar Rodríguez	00
(Austria) Michaela Polleres	00
(Republic of Ireland) Megan Fletcher	10

Third round
(France) Marie-Ève Gahié	01
(Canada) Emily Burt	00
(United Kingdom) Sally Conway	01
(Republic of Ireland) Megan Fletcher	00

Quarterfinals
(France) Marie-Ève Gahié	10
(United Kingdom) Sally Conway	00

=== Pool D ===
First round
(Uzbekistan) Gulnoza Matniyazova	00
(Japan) Yoko Ono	10
(Kazakhstan) Azhar Salykova	00
(Spain) Sara Rodríguez	01
(Ukraine) Nataliya Smal	00
(Belgium) Roxane Taeymans	01
(Denmark) Emilie Sook	00
(China) Yan Zi	10

Second round
(Sweden) Anna Bernholm	00
(Japan) Yoko Ono	10
(Spain) Sara Rodríguez	10
(Chad) Demos Memneloum	00
(Morocco) Assmaa Niang	10
(Belgium) Roxane Taeymans	00
(North Korea) Kwon Sun-yong	00
(China) Yan Zi	01

Third round
(Japan) Yoko Ono	10
(Spain) Sara Rodríguez	00
(Morocco) Assmaa Niang	11
(China) Yan Zi	00

Quarterfinals
(Japan) Yoko Ono	00
(Morocco) Assmaa Niang	10

== Prize money ==
The sums listed bring the total prizes awarded to €57,000 for the individual event.

Medal	Total	Judoka	Coach
Gold	€26,000	€20,800	€5,200
Silver	€15,000	€12,000	€3,000
Bronze	€8,000	€6,400	€1,600
