= Ayuk Otay Arrey Sophina =

Cameroonian judoka (born 1994)

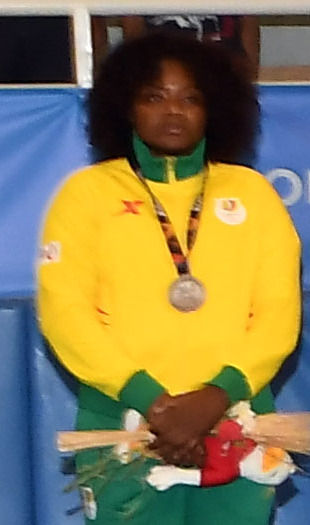

Personal information
- Born: 3 January 1994 (age 32)
- Occupation: Judoka

Sport
- Country: Cameroon
- Sport: Judo
- Weight class: –70 kg, –78 kg

Achievements and titles
- Olympic Games: R32 (2020)
- World Champ.: R32 (2018, 2019, 2021)
- African Champ.: (silver) (2020, 2022)
Medal record
Women's judo
Representing Cameroon
African Games
| Bronze medal – third place | 2019 Rabat | –70 kg |
African Championships
| Silver medal – second place | 2020 Antananarivo | –70 kg |
| Silver medal – second place | 2022 Oran | –78 kg |
| Bronze medal – third place | 2019 Cape Town | –70 kg |
Islamic Solidarity Games
| Silver medal – second place | 2021 Konya | Women's team |
Jeux de la Francophonie
| Bronze medal – third place | 2017 Abidjan | –70 kg |

Profile at external databases
- IJF: 16217
- JudoInside.com: 105686
- Updated on 29 May 2022

Ayuk Otay Arrey Sophina (born 3 January 1994) is a Cameroonian judoka. She won one of the bronze medals in the women's 70 kg event at the 2019 African Games held in Rabat, Morocco. She competed in the women's 70 kg event at the 2020 Summer Olympics held in Tokyo, Japan.

== Career ==
In 2019, she won one of the bronze medals in the women's 70 kg event at the African Judo Championships held in Cape Town, South Africa.

In 2020, she won the silver medal in this event at the African Judo Championships held in Antananarivo, Madagascar.

Prior to the 2020 Tokyo Olympic Games, she was living and training in Rouen, France.

Champion of Cameroon in 2014, 2015, 2016 and 2017, 2017. Decorated Knight of the Order of Valor by the President of the Republic of Cameroon.

== Achievements ==
| Year | Tournament | Place | Weight class |
|---|---|---|---|
| 2019 | African Games | 3rd | −70 kg |
| 2022 | African Championships | 2nd | −78 kg |
| 2021 | African Open (Yaounde) | 1st | −78 kg |
| 2020 | African Championships | 2nd | −70 kg |
| 2020 | African Open (Yaounde) | 1st | −70 kg |
| 2019 | African Championships | 3rd | −70 kg |
| 2019 | African Open (Yaounde) | 1st | −70 kg |
| 2018 | African Open (Yaounde) | 1st | −70 kg |
| 2018 | African Open (Dakar) | 1st | −70 kg |
| 2017 | Jeux de la Francophonie | 3rd | −70 kg |
