= 2023 World Judo Championships – Men's 73 kg =

Judo competition

Judo Men's 73 kg at the 2023 World Judo Championships
- Venue: Ali Bin Hamad Al Attiya Arena
- Location: Doha, Qatar
- Date: 9 May 2023
- Competitors: 55 from 43 nations
- Total prize money: €57,000

Medalists
gold medal	Nils Stump (1st title)	Switzerland
silver medal	Manuel Lombardo	Italy
bronze medal	Soichi Hashimoto	Japan
bronze medal	Murodjon Yuldoshev	Uzbekistan

Competition at external databases
- Links: IJF • JudoInside

The Men's 73 kg event at the 2023 World Judo Championships was held at the Ali Bin Hamad al-Attiyah Arena in Doha, Qatar on 9 May 2023. Stump became the first Swiss judoka to win gold at the World Judo Championships.

== Results ==
=== Finals ===
Semi-finals
(Switzerland) Nils Stump	02
(Uzbekistan) Murodjon Yuldoshev	00
(Azerbaijan) Hidayat Heydarov	00
(Italy) Manuel Lombardo	10

Final
(Switzerland) Nils Stump	10
(Italy) Manuel Lombardo	00

=== Repechage ===
Repechage
(Japan) Soichi Hashimoto	10
(Uzbekistan) Obidkhon Nomonov	00
(Canada) Arthur Margelidon	01
(Algeria) Messaoud Dris	00

Bronze medal
(Japan) Soichi Hashimoto	02
(Azerbaijan) Hidayat Heydarov	00
(Canada) Arthur Margelidon	00
(Uzbekistan) Murodjon Yuldoshev	10

=== Pool A ===
First round
(Morocco) Hassan Doukkali	00
(Japan) Soichi Hashimoto	10
(Cuba) Magdiel Estrada	00
(Tajikistan) Behruzi Khojazoda	01
(South Korea) Lee Eun-kyul	00
(Italy) Giovanni Esposito	10
(Turkey) Bilal Çiloğlu	00
(China) Qing Daga	11
(Philippines) Keisei Nakano	00
(United States) Dominic Rodriguez	10
(Spain) José Antonio Aranda	00
(Moldova) Petru Pelivan	01

Round of 32
(Georgia (country)) Lasha Shavdatuashvili	00
(Japan) Soichi Hashimoto	01
(Tajikistan) Behruzi Khojazoda	01
(Italy) Giovanni Esposito	00
(Switzerland) Nils Stump	10
(China) Qing Daga	00
(United States) Dominic Rodriguez	00
(Moldova) Petru Pelivan	10

Round of 16
(Japan) Soichi Hashimoto	01
(Tajikistan) Behruzi Khojazoda	00
(Switzerland) Nils Stump	02
(Moldova) Petru Pelivan	00

Quarter-finals
(Japan) Soichi Hashimoto	00
(Switzerland) Nils Stump	10

=== Pool B ===
First round
(Greece) Michail Tsoutlasvili	10
(Kyrgyzstan) Ertur Turdubaev	00
(Belgium) Abdul Malik Umayev	11
Kavan Majidi	01
(Kazakhstan) Zhansay Smagulov	00
Makhmadbek Makhmadbekov	01
(Romania) Alexandru Raicu	01
(France) Joan-Benjamin Gaba	11
(Poland) Adam Stodolski	00
(Bulgaria) Mark Hristov	02
(Mongolia) Batzayaagiin Erdenebayar	00
(Israel) Tohar Butbul	01

Round of 32
(Uzbekistan) Murodjon Yuldoshev	01
(Greece) Michail Tsoutlasvili	00
(Belgium) Abdul Malik Umayev	00
Makhmadbek Makhmadbekov	10
(Uzbekistan) Obidkhon Nomonov	02
(France) Joan-Benjamin Gaba	00
(Bulgaria) Mark Hristov	10
(Israel) Tohar Butbul	00

Round of 16
(Uzbekistan) Murodjon Yuldoshev	02
Makhmadbek Makhmadbekov	00
(Uzbekistan) Obidkhon Nomonov	11
(Bulgaria) Mark Hristov	01

Quarter-finals
(Uzbekistan) Murodjon Yuldoshev	10
(Uzbekistan) Obidkhon Nomonov	00

=== Pool C ===
First round
(Slovenia) Martin Hojak	00
(Moldova) Adil Osmanov	10
(Djibouti) Aden-Alexandre Houssein	00
(The Gambia) Faye Njie	11
(Germany) Alexander Gabler	00
(United States) Jack Yonezuka	10
(Peru) Alonso Wong	00
(Kyrgyzstan) Chyngyzkhan Sagynaliev	10
(Mexico) Gilberto Cardoso	10
(Republic of Ireland) Joshua Green	00
(Spain) Salvador Cases	10
(Poland) Ksawery Morka	00

Round of 32
(Azerbaijan) Hidayat Heydarov	10
(Moldova) Adil Osmanov	00
(The Gambia) Faye Njie	00
(United States) Jack Yonezuka	10
(Canada) Arthur Margelidon	10
(Kyrgyzstan) Chyngyzkhan Sagynaliev	00
(Mexico) Gilberto Cardoso	00
(Spain) Salvador Cases	10

Round of 16
(Azerbaijan) Hidayat Heydarov	10
(United States) Jack Yonezuka	00
(Canada) Arthur Margelidon	01
(Spain) Salvador Cases	00

Quarter-finals
(Azerbaijan) Hidayat Heydarov	01
(Canada) Arthur Margelidon	00

=== Pool D ===
First round
(India) Arun Kumar	00
(Tunisia) Aleddine Ben Chalbi	02
(Armenia) Ferdinand Karapetian	00
(Algeria) Messaoud Dris	01
(Kazakhstan) Daniyar Shamshayev	02
(Turkey) Umalt Demirel	01
(South Korea) Kang Heon-cheol	11
(Saudi Arabia) Sulaiman Hamad	00
(Kosovo) Akil Gjakova	11
(Romania) Adrian Şulcă	00

Round of 32
(Mongolia) Tsend-Ochiryn Tsogtbaatar	10
(Tunisia) Aleddine Ben Chalbi	00
(Algeria) Messaoud Dris	10
(Finland) Valtteri Olin	00
(Italy) Manuel Lombardo	01
(Kazakhstan) Daniyar Shamshayev	00
(South Korea) Kang Heon-cheol	00
(Kosovo) Akil Gjakova	10

Round of 16
(Mongolia) Tsend-Ochiryn Tsogtbaatar	01
(Algeria) Messaoud Dris	11
(Italy) Manuel Lombardo	02
(Kosovo) Akil Gjakova	00

Quarter-finals
(Algeria) Messaoud Dris	00
(Italy) Manuel Lombardo	11

== Prize money ==
The sums listed bring the total prizes awarded to €57,000 for the individual event.

Medal	Total	Judoka	Coach
Gold	€26,000	€20,800	€5,200
Silver	€15,000	€12,000	€3,000
Bronze	€8,000	€6,400	€1,600
