= Murodjon Yuldoshev =

Uzbekistani judoka (born 1995)

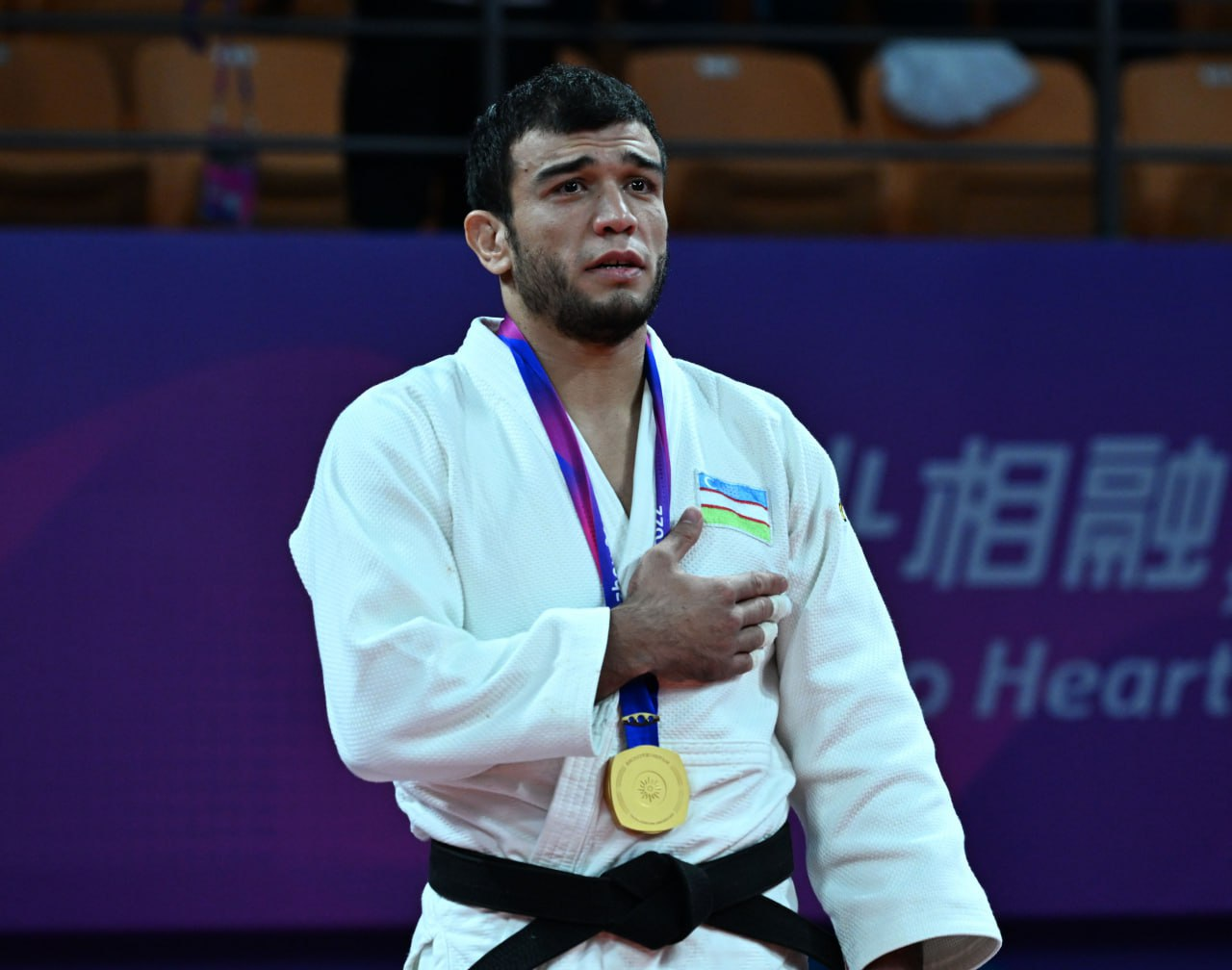

Personal information
- Born: 9 August 1995 (age 31)
- Occupation: Judoka
- Height: 175 cm (5 ft 9 in)

Sport
- Country: Uzbekistan
- Sport: Judo
- Weight class: ‍–‍73 kg

Achievements and titles
- Olympic Games: R16 (2024)
- World Champ.: (bronze) (2023)
- Asian Champ.: (gold) (2023)
Medal record
Men's judo
Representing Uzbekistan
World Championships
Bronze medal – third place	2023 Doha	‍–‍73 kg
Asian Games
Gold medal – first place	2023 Hangzhou	‍–‍73 kg
Silver medal – second place	2023 Hangzhou	Mixed team
Asian Championships
Silver medal – second place	2022 Nur‑Sultan	‍–‍73 kg
Silver medal – second place	2024 Hong Kong	‍–‍73 kg
World Masters
Bronze medal – third place	2022 Jerusalem	‍–‍73 kg
IJF Grand Slam
Gold medal – first place	2023 Tashkent	‍–‍73 kg
Bronze medal – third place	2022 Tbilisi	‍–‍73 kg
Bronze medal – third place	2025 Dushanbe	‍–‍81 kg
Bronze medal – third place	2026 Tashkent	‍–‍81 kg
Bronze medal – third place	2026 Budapest	‍–‍81 kg
IJF Grand Prix
Gold medal – first place	2022 Almada	‍–‍73 kg
Silver medal – second place	2025 Linz	‍–‍81 kg
Silver medal – second place	2026 Zagreb	‍–‍81 kg
Asian Cadet Championships
Gold medal – first place	2010 Bangkok	‍–‍42 kg

Profile at external databases
- IJF: 25516
- JudoInside.com: 115001
- Updated on 15 November 2026

Murodjon Yuldoshev (born 9 August 1995) is an Uzbekistani judoka. He won one of the bronze medals in the men's 73 kg event at the 2023 World Judo Championships.

== Career ==
In 2022, Yuldoshev won the silver medal in the men's 73 kg event at the Asian Judo Championships held in Nur-Sultan, Kazakhstan. He competed in his event at the 2022 World Judo Championships held in Tashkent, Uzbekistan where he was eliminated in his third match by eventual silver medalist Soichi Hashimoto of Japan. Two months later, he won one of the bronze medals in his event at the 2022 Judo World Masters held in Jerusalem, Israel.

Yuldoshev won a bronze in the men's 73 kg event at the 2023 World Judo Championships held in Doha, Qatar. He defeated Arthur Margelidon of Canada in his bronze medal match.
