= 2018 World Judo Championships – Mixed team =

Judo competition

Judo Mixed team at the 2018 World Judo Championships
- Venue: National Gymnastics Arena
- Location: Baku, Azerbaijan
- Date: 27 September 2018
- Competitors: 201 from 19 nations
- Total prize money: 200,000€

Medalists
gold medal	Chizuru Arai; Sarah Asahina; Hisayoshi Harasawa; Soichi Hashimoto; Shoichiro Mukai; Kenta Nagasawa; Yusei Ogawa; Yoko Ono; Akira Sone; Momo Tamaoki; Tsukasa Yoshida; Arata Tatsukawa	Japan
silver medal	Clarisse Agbegnenou; Benjamin Axus; Guillaume Chaine; Axel Clerget; Aurelien Diesse; Marie-Ève Gahié; Priscilla Gneto; Alexandre Iddir; Anne Fatoumata M'Bairo; Cyrille Maret; Hélène Receveaux; Audrey Tcheuméo	France
bronze medal	Kamila Badurova; Kseniia Chibisova; Anzhela Gasparian; Natalia Golomidova; Denis Yartsev; Mikhail Igolnikov; Khusen Khalmurzaev; Anastasiia Konkina; Musa Mogushkov; Alena Prokopenko; Inal Tasoev; Kazbek Zankishiev	Russia
bronze medal	An Ba-ul; An Chang-rim; Ahn Joon-sung; Cho Gu-ham; Choi In-hyuk; Gwak Dong-han; Han Mi-jin; Jeong Hye-jin; Kim Chol-gwang; Kim Ji-jeong; Kim Ji-su; Kim Jin-a; Kim Min-jeong; Kim Min-jong; Kwon Sun-yong; Kwon You-jeong; Lee Seung-soo; Ri Hyo-sun	Korea

Champions
- Mixed team: Japan (2nd title)

Competition at external databases
- Links: IJF • JudoInside

The mixed team competition at the 2018 World Judo Championships was held on 27 September 2018.

== Results ==
=== Finals ===
Semi-finals
Japan	4
Korea	0
France	4
Russia	1

Final
Japan	4
France	1

=== Repechage ===
Repechage
Azerbaijan	4
Netherlands	2

Third place
Azerbaijan	1
Russia	4

Repechage
Brazil	2
Germany	4

Third place
Germany	0
Korea	4

=== Pool A ===
Second round
Japan	4
Mongolia	0
Austria	1
Azerbaijan	4

Quarterfinals
Japan	4
Azerbaijan	2

=== Pool B ===
First round
Romania	4
Turkey	1

Second round
Korea	4
Romania	0
Uzbekistan	1
Netherlands	4

Quarterfinals
Korea	4
Netherlands	0

=== Pool C ===
First round
China	1
Cuba	4

Second round
Brazil	4
Cuba	3
France	4
Hungary	2

Quarterfinals
Brazil	2
France	4

=== Pool D ===
First round
Russia	4
Kazakhstan	0

Second round
Germany	4
Ukraine	2
Russia	4
Great Britain	2

Quarterfinals
Germany	1
Russia	4

== Prize money ==
The sums listed bring the total prizes awarded to 57,000€ for the individual event.

Medal	Total	Judoka	Coach
Gold	90,000€	72,000€	18,000€
Silver	60,000€	48,000€	12,000€
Bronze	25,000€	20,000€	5,000€
