= 2022 World Judo Championships – Men's 73 kg =

Judo competition

Judo Men's 73 kg at the 2022 World Judo Championships
- Venue: Humo Ice Dome
- Location: Tashkent, Uzbekistan
- Date: 8 October
- Competitors: 51 from 39 nations
- Total prize money: €57,000

Medalists
gold medal	Tsend-Ochiryn Tsogtbaatar (1st title)	Mongolia
silver medal	Soichi Hashimoto	Japan
bronze medal	Daniel Cargnin	Brazil
bronze medal	Hidayat Heydarov	Azerbaijan

Competition at external databases
- Links: IJF • JudoInside

The Men's 73 kg event at the 2022 World Judo Championships was held at the Humo Ice Dome arena in Tashkent, Uzbekistan on 8 October 2022.

== Results ==
=== Finals ===
Semi-finals
(Japan) Soichi Hashimoto	10
(Israel) Tohar Butbul	00
(Mongolia) Tsend-Ochiryn Tsogtbaatar	01
(Italy) Manuel Lombardo	00

Final
(Japan) Soichi Hashimoto	00
(Mongolia) Tsend-Ochiryn Tsogtbaatar	01

=== Repechage ===
Repechage
(Georgia (country)) Lasha Shavdatuashvili	00
(Brazil) Daniel Cargnin	01
(Canada) Arthur Margelidon	00
(Azerbaijan) Hidayat Heydarov	01

Bronze medal
(Brazil) Daniel Cargnin	10
(Italy) Manuel Lombardo	00
(Azerbaijan) Hidayat Heydarov	10
(Israel) Tohar Butbul	00

=== Pool A ===
First round
(Switzerland) Nils Stump	11
(Tajikistan) Muhammadrahim Sarakhonov	00
(Finland) Valtteri Olin	11
(Costa Rica) Julian Sancho	00
(Algeria) Messaoud Dris	00
(France) Joan-Benjamin Gaba	01
Jawid Jauhari	00
(Kyrgyzstan) Ertur Turdubaev	10
(The Gambia) Faye Njie	00
(Uzbekistan) Murodjon Yuldoshev	01

Round of 32
(Georgia (country)) Lasha Shavdatuashvili	10
(Switzerland) Nils Stump	00
(Italy) Giovanni Esposito	10
(Finland) Valtteri Olin	00
(Japan) Soichi Hashimoto	10
(France) Joan-Benjamin Gaba	00
(Kyrgyzstan) Ertur Turdubaev	00
(Uzbekistan) Murodjon Yuldoshev	01

Round of 16
(Georgia (country)) Lasha Shavdatuashvili	10
(Italy) Giovanni Esposito	00
(Japan) Soichi Hashimoto	10
(Uzbekistan) Murodjon Yuldoshev	00

Quarter-finals
(Georgia (country)) Lasha Shavdatuashvili	00
(Japan) Soichi Hashimoto	01

=== Pool B ===
First round
(Bulgaria) Mark Hristov	01
(Greece) Michail Tsoutlasvili	00
(United States) Jack Yonezuka	00
(Kazakhstan) Daniyar Shamshayev	01
(Romania) Alexandru Raicu	00
(Brazil) Daniel Cargnin	11
(Germany) Alexander Gabler	10
(Poland) Adam Stodolski	00

Round of 32
(Israel) Tohar Butbul	10
(Bulgaria) Mark Hristov	00
(Kazakhstan) Daniyar Shamshayev	00
(South Korea) Lee Eun-kyul	01
(Azerbaijan) Rustam Orujov	00
(Brazil) Daniel Cargnin	10
(Germany) Alexander Gabler	10
(Dominican Republic) Antonio Tornal	01

Round of 16
(Israel) Tohar Butbul	01
(South Korea) Lee Eun-kyul	00
(Brazil) Daniel Cargnin	10
(Germany) Alexander Gabler	00

Quarter-finals
(Israel) Tohar Butbul	10
(Brazil) Daniel Cargnin	00

=== Pool C ===
First round
(Israel) Ido Levin	11
(Saudi Arabia) Sulaiman Hamad	00
(Slovenia) Martin Hojak	00
(Poland) Wiktor Mrówczyński	10
(China) Qing Daga	10
(Czech Republic) Daniel Pochop	00
(Germany) Igor Wandtke	10
(Tunisia) Aleddine Ben Chalbi	00
(Cuba) Magdiel Estrada	10
Ahmad Alikaj	00

Round of 32
(Mongolia) Tsend-Ochiryn Tsogtbaatar	11
(Israel) Ido Levin	01
(Romania) Adrian Şulcă	10
(Poland) Wiktor Mrówczyński	00
(Canada) Arthur Margelidon	10
(China) Qing Daga	00
(Germany) Igor Wandtke	00
(Cuba) Magdiel Estrada	01

Round of 16
(Mongolia) Tsend-Ochiryn Tsogtbaatar	11
(Romania) Adrian Şulcă	00
(Canada) Arthur Margelidon	10
(Cuba) Magdiel Estrada	00

Quarter-finals
(Mongolia) Tsend-Ochiryn Tsogtbaatar	10
(Canada) Arthur Margelidon	00

=== Pool D ===
First round
(Belgium) Abdul Umayev	01
(Egypt) Ali Abdelmouaty	00
(United States) Dominic Rodriguez	00
(Uzbekistan) Shakhram Akhadov	11
(Tajikistan) Behruzi Khojazoda	01
(France) Benjamin Axus	00
(Kyrgyzstan) Chyngyzkhan Sagynaliev	01
(Philippines) Keisei Nakano	00
(Italy) Manuel Lombardo	10
(Ukraine) Artem Khomula	00

Round of 32
(Azerbaijan) Hidayat Heydarov	10
(Belgium) Abdul Umayev	00
(Spain) Salvador Cases	00
(Uzbekistan) Shakhram Akhadov	10
(Moldova) Victor Sterpu	11
(Tajikistan) Behruzi Khojazoda	00
(Kyrgyzstan) Chyngyzkhan Sagynaliev	00
(Italy) Manuel Lombardo	10

Round of 16
(Azerbaijan) Hidayat Heydarov	01
(Uzbekistan) Shakhram Akhadov	00
(Moldova) Victor Sterpu	00
(Italy) Manuel Lombardo	01

Quarter-finals
(Azerbaijan) Hidayat Heydarov	00
(Italy) Manuel Lombardo	01
