= Judo at the 2022 Asian Games – Men's 73 kg =

Judo competition

Judo Men's 73 kg at the 2022 Asian Games
- Venue: Xiaoshan Linpu Gymnasium
- Location: Hangzhou, China
- Date: 25 September 2023

Medalists
gold medal	Murodjon Yuldoshev	Uzbekistan
silver medal	Soichi Hashimoto	Japan
bronze medal	Tsend-Ochiryn Tsogtbaatar	Mongolia
bronze medal	Behruzi Khojazoda	Tajikistan

Competition at external databases
- Links: IJF • JudoInside

The men's 73 kilograms (lightweight) competition in Judo at the 2022 Asian Games in Hangzhou was held on 24 September 2023 at the Xiaoshan Linpu Gymnasium.

In the final, Murodjon Yuldoshev from Uzbekistan won the gold medal.

== Schedule ==
All times are China Standard Time (UTC+08:00)

Date	Time	Event
Sunday, 24 September 2023	10:00	Elimination round of 16
Sunday, 24 September 2023	10:00	Quarterfinals
Sunday, 24 September 2023	10:00	Repechage
Sunday, 24 September 2023	10:00	Semifinals
Sunday, 24 September 2023	16:00	Finals

== Results ==
=== Main bracket ===
==== Final ====
Gold medal contest
Soichi Hashimoto (JPN)	00
Murodjon Yuldoshev (UZB)	01

==== Top half ====
Round of 32
Masayuki Terada (THA)	10
Tandin Wangchuk (BHU)	00 (yellow card)
Abdullah Faea (YEM)	00
Mak Hong Nin (HKG)	01 (yellow card)

Round of 16
Soichi Hashimoto (JPN)	10 (yellow card)
Masayuki Terada (THA)	00
Chyngyzkhan Sagynaliev (KGZ)	10
Chamara Repiyallage (SRI)	00 (yellow card)
Behruzi Khojazoda (TJK)	10
Keisei Nakano (PHI)	00
Daniyar Shamshayev (KAZ)	10
Mak Hong Nin (HKG)	00

Quarter-finals
Soichi Hashimoto (JPN)	10
Chyngyzkhan Sagynaliev (KGZ)	00 (yellow card)
Behruzi Khojazoda (TJK)	10
Daniyar Shamshayev (KAZ)	00

Semi-finals
Soichi Hashimoto (JPN)	01
Behruzi Khojazoda (TJK)	00 (yellow card)

==== Bottom half ====
Round of 32
Karim Abdulaev (UAE)	00
Kim Chol-gwang (PRK)	01 (yellow card)

Round of 16
Tsend-Ochiryn Tsogtbaatar (MGL)	11 (yellow card)
Shintaro Umo (CAM)	00
Qing Daga (CHN)	10
Ghady Moussa (LBN)	00 (yellow card)
Murodjon Yuldoshev (UZB)	11 (yellow card)
Biaslan Hajali (BHR)	00
Kang Heon-cheol (KOR)	00
Kim Chol-gwang (PRK)	10

Quarter-finals
Tsend-Ochiryn Tsogtbaatar (MGL)	10
Qing Daga (CHN)	00
Murodjon Yuldoshev (UZB)	10 (yellow card)
Kim Chol-gwang (PRK)	00

Semi-finals
Tsend-Ochiryn Tsogtbaatar (MGL)	00
Murodjon Yuldoshev (UZB)	10

=== Repechage ===
Repechage
Chyngyzkhan Sagynaliev (KGZ)	00
Daniyar Shamshayev (KAZ)	10 (yellow card)
Qing Daga (CHN)	11
Kim Chol-gwang (PRK)	00

Bronze medal contests
Daniyar Shamshayev (KAZ)	00 (yellow card)
Tsend-Ochiryn Tsogtbaatar (MGL)	10
Qing Daga (CHN)	00
Behruzi Khojazoda (TJK)	10
