= Natalia Golomidova =

Russian judoka (born 1995)

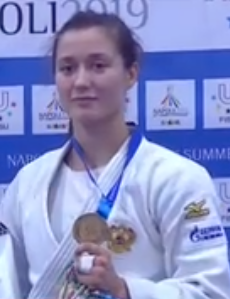
- At the 2019 Summer University Games

Personal information
- Full name: Natalia Sergeyevna Golomidova
- Born: 8 June 1995 (age 31)
- Occupation: Judoka

Sport
- Country: Russia
- Sport: Judo
- Weight class: ‍–‍57 kg
Medal record
Women's judo
Representing Russia
World Championships
Bronze medal – third place	2018 Baku	Mixed team
IJF Grand Slam
Bronze medal – third place	2016 Tyumen	‍–‍57 kg
IJF Grand Prix
Bronze medal – third place	2016 Zagreb	‍–‍57 kg
Bronze medal – third place	2017 Tbilisi	‍–‍57 kg
European U23 Championships
Silver medal – second place	2017 Podgorica	‍–‍57 kg
Bronze medal – third place	2016 Tel Aviv	‍–‍57 kg
European Cadet Championships
Bronze medal – third place	2011 Cottonera	‍–‍48 kg
Summer Universiade
Silver medal – second place	2019 Naples	Women's team
Bronze medal – third place	2017 Taipei	Women's team
Bronze medal – third place	2019 Naples	‍–‍57 kg

Profile at external databases
- IJF: 8182
- JudoInside.com: 73862
- Updated on 25 November 2022

Natalia Sergeyevna Golomidova (Russian: Наталья Сергеевна Голомидова; born 8 June 1995) is a Russian judoka.

Golomidova participated at the 2018 World Judo Championships, winning a medal in the mixed team event.
