= Yusei Ogawa =

Japanese judoka

Personal information
- Nationality: Japanese
- Born: 20 July 1996 (age 29) Kanagawa, Japan
- Occupation: Judoka

Sport
- Country: Japan
- Sport: Judo
- Weight class: +100 kg

Achievements and titles
- World Champ.: R16 (2018)
Medal record
Men's judo
Representing Japan
World Championships
Gold medal – first place	2018 Baku	Mixed team
IJF Grand Slam
Gold medal – first place	2017 Tokyo	+100 kg
Silver medal – second place	2016 Tyumen	+100 kg
Bronze medal – third place	2022 Ulaanbaatar	+100 kg
IJF Grand Prix
Gold medal – first place	2016 Qingdao	+100 kg
World Juniors Championships
Bronze medal – third place	2015 Abu Dhabi	+100 kg

Profile at external databases
- IJF: 17382
- JudoInside.com: 92563
- Updated on 26 June 2022

Yusei Ogawa (小川 雄勢, Ogawa Yūsei; born 20 July 1996) is a Japanese judoka. He is the son of 1992 Olympic silver medalist Naoya Ogawa.

He participated at the 2018 World Judo Championships, winning a medal.
