= Mohammad Mohammadi (judoka) =

Iranian judoka (born 1994)

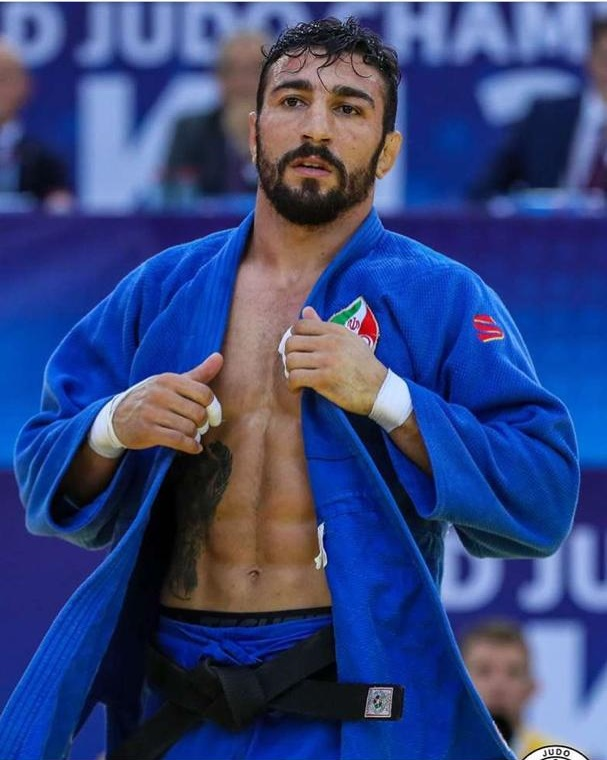

Personal information
- Full name: Mohammad Mohammadi Barimanlou
- Born: 24 January 1994 (age 32) Bojnord, Iran
- Occupation: Judoka
- Height: 1.75 m (5 ft 9 in)
- Website: instagram

Sport
- Country: Iran
- Sport: Judo
- Weight class: ‍–‍73 kg

Achievements and titles
- World Champ.: (bronze) (2018)
- Asian Champ.: (bronze) (2018)
Medal record
Men's judo
Representing Iran
World Championships
Bronze medal – third place	2018 Baku	‍–‍73 kg
Asian Games
Bronze medal – third place	2018 Jakarta	‍–‍73 kg
IJF Grand Prix
Bronze medal – third place	2017 Hohhot	‍–‍73 kg
Bronze medal – third place	2018 Antalya	‍–‍73 kg

Profile at external databases
- IJF: 20476
- JudoInside.com: 96198
- Updated on 23 May 2023

Mohammad Mohammadi Barimanlou (Persian: محمد محمدی بریمانلو; born 24 January 1994) is an Iranian judoka.

Mohammadi participated at the 2018 World Judo Championships, winning a bronze medal. He won a bronze medal at the 2018 Asian Games in Jakarta.
