= Anzhela Gasparian =

Russian judoka (born 1996)

Personal information
- Born: 27 August 1996 (age 29)
- Occupation: Judoka

Sport
- Country: Russia
- Sport: Judo
- Weight class: +78 kg

Achievements and titles
- World Champ.: R16 (2021)
- European Champ.: R16 (2021)
Medal record
Women's judo
Representing Russia
World Championships
Bronze medal – third place	2018 Baku	Mixed team
IJF Grand Prix
Bronze medal – third place	2017 Tashkent	+78 kg
Summer Universiade
Bronze medal – third place	2017 Taipei	Open

Profile at external databases
- IJF: 22443
- JudoInside.com: 107556
- Updated on 6 December 2022

Anzhela Gasparian (born 27 August 1996) is a Russian judoka.

Gasparian participated at the 2018 World Judo Championships, winning a medal in the Mixed team event. In 2021, she competed in the women's +78 kg event at the 2021 World Judo Championships held in Budapest, Hungary.
