= Yoko Ono (judoka) =

Japanese judoka

Personal information
- Native name: 大野陽子
- Nationality: Japanese
- Born: 27 November 1989 (age 36)
- Occupation: Judoka

Sport
- Country: Japan
- Sport: Judo
- Weight class: –70 kg
- Retired: 1 November 2022

Achievements and titles
- World Champ.: (silver) (2021)
- Asian Champ.: (gold) (2016, 2017, 2022)
Medal record
Women's judo
Representing Japan
World Championships
Gold medal – first place	2018 Baku	Mixed team
Gold medal – first place	2019 Tokyo	Mixed team
Gold medal – first place	2021 Budapest	Mixed team
Silver medal – second place	2021 Budapest	‍–‍70 kg
Bronze medal – third place	2018 Baku	‍–‍70 kg
Asian Championships
Gold medal – first place	2016 Tashkent	‍–‍70 kg
Gold medal – first place	2017 Hong Kong	‍–‍70 kg
Gold medal – first place	2022 Nur‑Sultan	‍–‍70 kg
World Masters
Gold medal – first place	2021 Doha	‍–‍70 kg
IJF Grand Slam
Gold medal – first place	2017 Tokyo	‍–‍70 kg
Gold medal – first place	2018 Düsseldorf	‍–‍70 kg
Gold medal – first place	2019 Paris	‍–‍70 kg
Gold medal – first place	2019 Osaka	‍–‍70 kg
Gold medal – first place	2020 Paris	‍–‍70 kg
Silver medal – second place	2015 Tokyo	‍–‍70 kg
Silver medal – second place	2022 Ulaanbaatar	‍–‍70 kg
Bronze medal – third place	2021 Paris	‍–‍70 kg
Bronze medal – third place	2022 Paris	‍–‍70 kg
IJF Grand Prix
Silver medal – second place	2018 Zagreb	‍–‍70 kg
Bronze medal – third place	2011 Amsterdam	‍–‍70 kg
Bronze medal – third place	2013 Ulaanbaatar	‍–‍70 kg

Profile at external databases
- IJF: 4422
- JudoInside.com: 74810
- Updated on 23 May 2023

Yoko Ono (大野陽子, Ōno Yōko; born 27 November 1989) is a Japanese retired judoka.

She participated at the 2018 World Judo Championships, winning a medal. In 2021, she won the gold medal in her event at the 2021 Judo World Masters held in Doha, Qatar. She also won one of the bronze medals in her event at the 2022 Judo Grand Slam Paris in France.
