= 2017 Judo Grand Prix Tbilisi =

Judo competition

Judo 2017 Judo Grand Prix Tbilisi
- Venue: Olympic Palace
- Location: Tbilisi, Georgia
- Dates: 31 March – 2 April 2017
- Competitors: 250 from 35 nations

Competition at external databases
- Links: IJF • EJU • JudoInside

The 2017 Judo Grand Prix Tbilisi was held at the Olympic Palace in Tbilisi, Georgia, from 31 March to 2 April 2017.

== Medal summary ==
=== Men's events ===
Event	Gold	Silver	Bronze
Extra-lightweight (−60 kg)	Lukhumi Chkhvimiani (GEO)	Amiran Papinashvili (GEO)	Phelipe Pelim (BRA)
Extra-lightweight (−60 kg)	Lukhumi Chkhvimiani (GEO)	Amiran Papinashvili (GEO)	Islam Yashuev (RUS)
Half-lightweight (−66 kg)	Lasha Giunashvili (GEO)	Davaadorjiin Tömörkhüleg (MGL)	Charles Chibana (BRA)
Half-lightweight (−66 kg)	Lasha Giunashvili (GEO)	Davaadorjiin Tömörkhüleg (MGL)	Yakub Shamilov (RUS)
Lightweight (−73 kg)	Giyosjon Boboev (UZB)	Tommy Macias (SWE)	Zhansay Smagulov (KAZ)
Lightweight (−73 kg)	Giyosjon Boboev (UZB)	Tommy Macias (SWE)	Uali Kurzhev (RUS)
Half-middleweight (−81 kg)	Victor Penalber (BRA)	Alan Khubetsov (RUS)	Saeid Mollaei (IRI)
Half-middleweight (−81 kg)	Victor Penalber (BRA)	Alan Khubetsov (RUS)	Aziz Kalkamanuly (KAZ)
Middleweight (−90 kg)	Stanislav Retinskii (RUS)	Mikhail Igolnikov (RUS)	Shakhzodbek Sabirov (UZB)
Middleweight (−90 kg)	Stanislav Retinskii (RUS)	Mikhail Igolnikov (RUS)	Ushangi Margiani (GEO)
Half-heavyweight (−100 kg)	Kazbek Zankishiev (RUS)	Martin Pacek (SWE)	Rafael Buzacarini (BRA)
Half-heavyweight (−100 kg)	Kazbek Zankishiev (RUS)	Martin Pacek (SWE)	Jevgeņijs Borodavko (LAT)
Heavyweight (+100 kg)	Adam Okruashvili (GEO)	Stanislav Bondarenko (UKR)	Levani Matiashvili (GEO)
Heavyweight (+100 kg)	Adam Okruashvili (GEO)	Stanislav Bondarenko (UKR)	David Moura (BRA)

=== Women's events ===
Event	Gold	Silver	Bronze
Extra-lightweight (−48 kg)	Stefannie Arissa Koyama (BRA)	Maryna Cherniak (UKR)	Mélanie Clément (FRA)
Extra-lightweight (−48 kg)	Stefannie Arissa Koyama (BRA)	Maryna Cherniak (UKR)	Mariia Persidskaia (RUS)
Half-lightweight (−52 kg)	Amandine Buchard (FRA)	Érika Miranda (BRA)	Joana Ramos (POR)
Half-lightweight (−52 kg)	Amandine Buchard (FRA)	Érika Miranda (BRA)	Darya Skrypnik (BLR)
Lightweight (−57 kg)	Irina Zabludina (RUS)	Rafaela Silva (BRA)	Natalia Golomidova (RUS)
Lightweight (−57 kg)	Irina Zabludina (RUS)	Rafaela Silva (BRA)	Margriet Bergstra (NED)
Half-middleweight (−63 kg)	Magdalena Krssakova (AUT)	Edwige Gwend (ITA)	Kathrin Unterwurzacher (AUT)
Half-middleweight (−63 kg)	Magdalena Krssakova (AUT)	Edwige Gwend (ITA)	Andreja Leški (SLO)
Middleweight (−70 kg)	Maria Portela (BRA)	Elvismar Rodríguez (VEN)	Szabina Gercsák (HUN)
Middleweight (−70 kg)	Maria Portela (BRA)	Elvismar Rodríguez (VEN)	Natascha Ausma (NED)
Half-heavyweight (−78 kg)	Anastasiya Turchyn (UKR)	Sama Hawa Camara (FRA)	Assunta Galeone (ITA)
Half-heavyweight (−78 kg)	Anastasiya Turchyn (UKR)	Sama Hawa Camara (FRA)	Madeleine Malonga (FRA)
Heavyweight (+78 kg)	Maryna Slutskaya (BLR)	Maria Suelen Altheman (BRA)	Svitlana Iaromka (UKR)
Heavyweight (+78 kg)	Maryna Slutskaya (BLR)	Maria Suelen Altheman (BRA)	Mercédesz Szigetvári (HUN)

Source Results

=== Medal table ===
* Host nation (Georgia)

Rank	Nation	Gold	Silver	Bronze	Total
1	Brazil (BRA)	3	3	4	10
2	Russia (RUS)	3	2	5	10
3	Georgia (GEO)*	3	1	2	6
4	Ukraine (UKR)	1	2	1	4
5	France (FRA)	1	1	2	4
6	Austria (AUT)	1	0	1	2
6	Belarus (BLR)	1	0	1	2
6	Uzbekistan (UZB)	1	0	1	2
9	Sweden (SWE)	0	2	0	2
10	Italy (ITA)	0	1	1	2
11	Mongolia (MGL)	0	1	0	1
11	Venezuela (VEN)	0	1	0	1
13	Hungary (HUN)	0	0	2	2
13	Kazakhstan (KAZ)	0	0	2	2
13	Netherlands (NED)	0	0	2	2
16	Iran (IRI)	0	0	1	1
16	Latvia (LAT)	0	0	1	1
16	Portugal (POR)	0	0	1	1
16	Slovenia (SLO)	0	0	1	1
Totals (19 entries)		14	14	28	56
