= Fagan Guluzada =

Azerbaijani judoka (born 1995)

Personal information
- Born: 14 March 1995 (age 31)
- Occupation: Judoka

Sport
- Country: Azerbaijan
- Sport: Judo
- Weight class: ‍–‍81 kg
Medal record
Men's judo
Representing Azerbaijan
IJF Grand Prix
Bronze medal – third place	2016 Ulaanbaatar	‍–‍73 kg
Bronze medal – third place	2017 Tashkent	‍–‍81 kg

Profile at external databases
- IJF: 7624
- JudoInside.com: 79529/
- Updated on 27 November 2021

Fagan Guluzada (born 14 March 1995) is an Azerbaijani judoka.

Guluzada is a bronze medalist from the 2017 Judo Grand Prix Tashkent in the ‍–‍81 kg category.
