= 2017 Judo Grand Prix Tashkent =

Judo competition

Judo 2017 Judo Grand Prix Tashkent
- Venue: Uzbekistan Tennis Courts
- Location: Tashkent, Uzbekistan
- Dates: 6–8 October 2017
- Competitors: 181 from 27 nations

Competition at external databases
- Links: IJF • EJU • JudoInside

The 2017 Judo Grand Prix Tashkent was held at the Uzbekistan Tennis Courts in Tashkent, Uzbekistan, from 6 to 8 October 2017.

== Medal summary ==
=== Men's events ===
Event	Gold	Silver	Bronze
Extra-lightweight (−60 kg)	Vugar Shirinli (AZE)	Islam Yashuev (RUS)	Sharafuddin Lutfillaev (UZB)
Extra-lightweight (−60 kg)	Vugar Shirinli (AZE)	Islam Yashuev (RUS)	Abylaikhan Sharatov (KAZ)
Half-lightweight (−66 kg)	Dzmitry Minkou (BLR)	Ganboldyn Kherlen (MGL)	Dovdony Altansükh (MGL)
Half-lightweight (−66 kg)	Dzmitry Minkou (BLR)	Ganboldyn Kherlen (MGL)	Sardor Nurillaev (UZB)
Lightweight (−73 kg)	Zhansay Smagulov (KAZ)	Giyosjon Boboev (UZB)	Telman Valiyev (AZE)
Lightweight (−73 kg)	Zhansay Smagulov (KAZ)	Giyosjon Boboev (UZB)	Khikmatillokh Turaev (UZB)
Half-middleweight (−81 kg)	Sagi Muki (ISR)	Nyamsürengiin Dagvasüren (MGL)	Fagan Guluzada (AZE)
Half-middleweight (−81 kg)	Sagi Muki (ISR)	Nyamsürengiin Dagvasüren (MGL)	Sharofiddin Boltaboev (UZB)
Middleweight (−90 kg)	Komronshokh Ustopiriyon (TJK)	Dilshod Choriev (UZB)	Yakhyo Imamov (UZB)
Middleweight (−90 kg)	Komronshokh Ustopiriyon (TJK)	Dilshod Choriev (UZB)	Yahor Varapayeu (BLR)
Half-heavyweight (−100 kg)	Ramadan Darwish (EGY)	Niyaz Ilyasov (RUS)	Sherali Juraev (UZB)
Heavyweight (+100 kg)	Or Sasson (ISR)	Iurii Krakovetskii (KGZ)	Boltoboy Baltaev (UZB)
Heavyweight (+100 kg)	Or Sasson (ISR)	Iurii Krakovetskii (KGZ)	Bekmurod Oltiboev (UZB)

=== Women's events ===
Event	Gold	Silver	Bronze
Extra-lightweight (−48 kg)	Mönkhbatyn Urantsetseg (MGL)	Milica Nikolić (SRB)	Éva Csernoviczki (HUN)
Extra-lightweight (−48 kg)	Mönkhbatyn Urantsetseg (MGL)	Milica Nikolić (SRB)	Mariia Persidskaia (RUS)
Half-lightweight (−52 kg)	Betina Temelkova (ISR)	Agata Perenc (POL)	Charline Van Snick (BEL)
Half-lightweight (−52 kg)	Betina Temelkova (ISR)	Agata Perenc (POL)	Petra Nareks (SLO)
Lightweight (−57 kg)	Anna Kuczera (POL)	Timna Nelson-Levy (ISR)	Kaja Kajzer (SLO)
Lightweight (−57 kg)	Anna Kuczera (POL)	Timna Nelson-Levy (ISR)	Sevara Nishanbayeva (KAZ)
Half-middleweight (−63 kg)	Kathrin Unterwurzacher (AUT)	Hannah Martin (USA)	Ekaterina Valkova (RUS)
Half-middleweight (−63 kg)	Kathrin Unterwurzacher (AUT)	Hannah Martin (USA)	Catherine Beauchemin-Pinard (CAN)
Middleweight (−70 kg)	Gulnoza Matniyazova (UZB)	Emilie Sook (DEN)	Anka Pogačnik (SLO)
Middleweight (−70 kg)	Gulnoza Matniyazova (UZB)	Emilie Sook (DEN)	Szabina Gercsák (HUN)
Half-heavyweight (−78 kg)	Anastasiya Turchyn (UKR)	Beata Pacut (POL)	Anastasiya Dmitrieva (RUS)
Half-heavyweight (−78 kg)	Anastasiya Turchyn (UKR)	Beata Pacut (POL)	Yarden Mayersohn (ISR)
Heavyweight (+78 kg)	Anamari Velenšek (SLO)	Gulzhan Issanova (KAZ)	Sarah Adlington (GBR)
Heavyweight (+78 kg)	Anamari Velenšek (SLO)	Gulzhan Issanova (KAZ)	Anzhela Gasparian (RUS)

Source Results

=== Medal table ===
* Host nation (Uzbekistan)

Rank	Nation	Gold	Silver	Bronze	Total
1	Israel (ISR)	3	1	1	5
2	Uzbekistan (UZB)*	1	2	8	11
3	Mongolia (MGL)	1	2	1	4
4	Poland (POL)	1	2	0	3
5	Kazakhstan (KAZ)	1	1	2	4
6	Slovenia (SLO)	1	0	3	4
7	Azerbaijan (AZE)	1	0	2	3
8	Belarus (BLR)	1	0	1	2
9	Austria (AUT)	1	0	0	1
9	Egypt (EGY)	1	0	0	1
9	Tajikistan (TJK)	1	0	0	1
9	Ukraine (UKR)	1	0	0	1
13	Russia (RUS)	0	2	4	6
14	Denmark (DEN)	0	1	0	1
14	Kyrgyzstan (KGZ)	0	1	0	1
14	Serbia (SRB)	0	1	0	1
14	United States (USA)	0	1	0	1
18	Hungary (HUN)	0	0	2	2
19	Belgium (BEL)	0	0	1	1
19	Canada (CAN)	0	0	1	1
19	Great Britain (GBR)	0	0	1	1
Totals (21 entries)		14	14	27	55
