= Lasha Giunashvili =

Georgian judoka (born 1992)

Personal information
- Born: 29 July 1992 (age 33)
- Occupation: Judoka

Sport
- Country: Georgia
- Sport: Judo
- Weight class: ‍–‍66 kg
Medal record
Men's judo
Representing Georgia
IJF Grand Slam
Bronze medal – third place	2017 Baku	‍–‍66 kg
IJF Grand Prix
Gold medal – first place	2017 Tbilisi	‍–‍66 kg

Profile at external databases
- IJF: 3719
- JudoInside.com: 70070
- Updated on 25 November 2022

Lasha Giunashvili (born 29 July 1992) is a Georgian judoka.

Giunashvili is the gold medalist of the 2017 Judo Grand Prix Tbilisi in the ‍–‍66 kg category.
