= Soichi Hashimoto =

Japanese judoka (born 1991)

Personal information
- Native name: 橋本壮市
- Born: 24 August 1991 (age 35) Shizuoka, Japan
- Home town: Tokyo, Japan
- Education: Tokai University
- Occupation: Judoka
- Height: 170 cm (5 ft 7 in)

Sport
- Country: Japan
- Sport: Judo, Brazilian jiu-jitsu
- Weight class: ‍–‍73 kg
- Rank: 3rd dan black belt
- Team: All-Japan National Team; Park 24
- Coached by: Minoru Konegawa
- Retired: 13 November 2023

Achievements and titles
- Olympic Games: (bronze) (2024)
- World Champ.: (gold) (2017)
- Asian Champ.: (gold) (2016)
Medal record
Men's judo
Representing Japan
Olympic Games
Silver medal – second place	2024 Paris	Mixed team
Bronze medal – third place	2024 Paris	‍–‍73 kg
World Championships
Gold medal – first place	2017 Budapest	‍–‍73 kg
Gold medal – first place	2017 Budapest	Mixed team
Gold medal – first place	2018 Baku	Mixed team
Gold medal – first place	2019 Tokyo	Mixed team
Gold medal – first place	2021 Budapest	Mixed team
Gold medal – first place	2022 Tashkent	Mixed team
Gold medal – first place	2023 Doha	Mixed team
Silver medal – second place	2018 Baku	‍–‍73 kg
Silver medal – second place	2022 Tashkent	‍–‍73 kg
Bronze medal – third place	2021 Budapest	‍–‍73 kg
Bronze medal – third place	2023 Doha	‍–‍73 kg
Asian Games
Silver medal – second place	2023 Hangzhou	‍–‍73 kg
Asian Championships
Gold medal – first place	2016 Tashkent	‍–‍73 kg
Bronze medal – third place	2015 Kuwait City	‍–‍73 kg
World Masters
Gold medal – first place	2016 Guadalajara	‍–‍73 kg
Gold medal – first place	2017 Saint Petersburg	‍–‍73 kg
Gold medal – first place	2019 Qingdao	‍–‍73 kg
Gold medal – first place	2023 Budapest	‍–‍73 kg
Silver medal – second place	2021 Doha	‍–‍73 kg
IJF Grand Slam
Gold medal – first place	2016 Tokyo	‍–‍73 kg
Gold medal – first place	2017 Paris	‍–‍73 kg
Gold medal – first place	2017 Ekaterinburg	‍–‍73 kg
Gold medal – first place	2019 Paris	‍–‍73 kg
Gold medal – first place	2020 Paris	‍–‍73 kg
Gold medal – first place	2022 Tokyo	‍–‍73 kg
Silver medal – second place	2019 Osaka	‍–‍73 kg
Silver medal – second place	2022 Paris	‍–‍73 kg
Silver medal – second place	2023 Tokyo	‍–‍73 kg
Bronze medal – third place	2017 Tokyo	‍–‍73 kg
Bronze medal – third place	2019 Brasilia	‍–‍73 kg
Bronze medal – third place	2024 Tbilisi	‍–‍73 kg
IJF Grand Prix
Gold medal – first place	2015 Qingdao	‍–‍73 kg
Gold medal – first place	2019 Montreal	‍–‍73 kg
Silver medal – second place	2018 Hohhot	‍–‍73 kg

Profile at external databases
- IJF: 17805
- JudoInside.com: 66617
- Updated on 31 July 2024

Soichi Hashimoto (Japanese: 橋本壮市; born 24 August 1991) is a Japanese retired judoka. Hashimoto was ranked first in the lightweight division.

Hashimoto rose to prominence by becoming national champion at the All-Japan Judo Championships in 2015. He then became one of the lightweight division's top judokas by winning five tournaments consecutively, spanning from the 2016 World Masters to the 2016 Tokyo Grand Slam and 2017 Paris Grand Slam.

Hashimoto is known for his dynamic style of judo and strong groundwork.

== Career ==
=== 2015 Grand Prix Qingdao ===
Hashimoto's first opponent at the 2015 Qingdao Grand Prix was Bang Gui-man of Korea. It was a heavy fight for grips, with many penalties on both sides. However, despite both being level with three shidos each, Bang was penalised for the fourth time and awarded hansoku make, bringing Hashimoto through to his second fight.

Hashimoto then faced American Nicholas Delpopolo, in a relatively equal match, with only a yuko separating them when Hashimoto attacked with an osoto gari. Even though the throw was relegated from ippon, it was enough to send the Japanese to the quarter-final.

Hashimoto made short work of his opponent, Italian Enrico Parlati, pressuring the latter to be penalised for a false attack with a drop seoi nage in the early seconds of the fight. Hashimoto then threw Parlati with a seoi nage for ippon in just 30 seconds.

Hashimoto again showed a masterclass in the semi-final against Giyosjon Boboev of Uzbekistan, again pressuring the latter to make a false attack with a drop seoi nage just 12 seconds in. Hashimoto unsuccessfully attempted a drop seoi otoshi, however he managed to bring the fight to the ground. He finished the fight by ippon with a signature juji gatame.

In the final, Hashimoto was against top-ranked Rustam Orujov. He scored ippon with a seoi nage in a little over a minute, winning the tournament's gold medal.

=== Rise to prominence: Undefeated run from 2016 to 2018 ===
==== 2016 Masters Guadalajara ====
At the invitation-only 2016 World Masters, Hashimoto faced Sainjargalyn Nyam-Ochir in his first fight. It was a smaller group of fighters as the event was only months away from the 2016 Olympics. The bout was shido-filled, both fighters having been penalised for false attacks and passivity. However, Hashimoto pulled through when Sainjargalyn was penalised with a third shido.

He then faced Israeli Sagi Muki, in another tight, shido-dominated fight. Over two minutes into the bout, Hashimoto scored a wazaari with an osoto gari. Despite being penalised for avoiding grip twice following the score, he was through to the semi-finals as Muki failed to score.

Hashimoto faced Orujov for a place in the final. Another tactical fight ensued, with only a shido separating them. Hashimoto's opponent for the gold medal match was Ganbaataryn Odbayar. He showed a newaza masterclass with an unusual juji-gatame for ippon. IJF commentators remarked that the armbar was more reminiscent of Brazilian jiu-jitsu than of judo. They speculated that Hashimoto had trained in BJJ.

==== 2016 Grand Slam Tokyo ====
Hashimoto faced Lee Feng-mao of Taiwan in Round 2 of the 2016 Tokyo Grand Slam. He caught Lee with an ippon seoi nage a minute and a half into the fight, and scored wazaari. He then connected to a yoko shiho gatame for ippon. In the following fight, he faced Boboev who was ready for a tactical battle. Hashimoto succeeded when Boboev picked up a second shido for passivity. Hashimoto carried on with a tactical strategy as he went against countryman Arata Tatsukawa in the semi-final. He also won by a single shido, controlling the grips and causing Tatsukawa to be defensive.

The final was set against Takeshi Doi in another level fight. Doi tried to bring the fight to the ground in the opening moments of the bout, and fought with a lasso guard as Hashimoto remained in a stand-up stance while attempting osaekomi. He then managed to break Doi's guard as Doi rolled to his front, which Hashimoto followed with an unsuccessful juji gatame attempt. The fight then varied between newaza and fighting for grips. Doi then lost the final by stepping outside the tatami, giving the gold medal to Hashimoto.

In 2021, Hashimoto won the silver medal in his event at the 2021 World Masters held in Doha, Qatar. He won one of the bronze medals in the men's 73 kg event at the 2023 World Championships held in Doha, Qatar.

== Filmography ==
=== Web shows ===
Year	Title	Role	Notes	Ref.
2025	Physical: Asia	Contestant	Netflix	
