= Karene Agono =

Gabonese judoka (born 1991)

Personal information
- Born: 25 February 1991 (age 35)
- Occupation: Judoka

Sport
- Country: Gabon
- Sport: Judo
- Weight class: ‍–‍70 kg, ‍–‍78 kg

Achievements and titles
- World Champ.: R64 (2018, 2019, 2021, 2024)
- African Champ.: (bronze) (2018)
Medal record
Women's judo
Representing Gabon
African Games
Gold medal – first place	2019 Rabat	‍–‍70 kg
African Championships
Bronze medal – third place	2018 Tunis	‍–‍70 kg
African Junior Championships
Bronze medal – third place	2010 Dakar	‍–‍52 kg

Profile at external databases
- IJF: 6889
- JudoInside.com: 14208
- Updated on 27 May 2024

Karene Agono (born 25 February 1991) is a Gabonese judoka. She is a 2018 African Judo Championships bronze medalist.
