= Kwon Sun-yong =

North Korean judoka (born 1995)

Personal information
- Nationality: North Korean
- Born: 23 June 1995 (age 31)

Sport
- Country: North Korea
- Sport: Judo
- Event: –70 kg
Medal record
World Championships
Bronze medal – third place	2018 Baku	Mixed team

Kwon Sun-yong (born 23 June 1995) is a North Korean judoka.

She participated at the 2018 World Judo Championships, winning a medal.
