= Nicolas Yonezuka =

American judoka

Nicolas Yonezuka is a former American competitor in the sport of judo.

== Early life ==
Yonezuka is from New Jersey. He attended Watchung Hills Regional High School, where he made the schools Hall of Fame. He was taught judo by his father, Yoshisada Yonezuka.

== Athletic career ==
Nicolas was a 5 time US National Judo Champion, and qualified for the 1980 U.S. Olympic team but did not compete due to the U.S. Olympic Committee's boycott of the 1980 Summer Olympics in Moscow, Russia at the age of 16. He was one of 461 athletes to receive a Congressional Gold Medal many years later.
