= 2021 World Judo Championships – Women's 70 kg =

Judo competition

Judo Women's 70 kg at the 2021 World Judo Championships
- Venue: László Papp Budapest Sports Arena
- Location: Budapest, Hungary
- Date: 10 June
- Competitors: 38 from 34 nations
- Total prize money: 57,000€

Medalists
gold medal	Barbara Matić (1st title)	Croatia
silver medal	Yoko Ono	Japan
bronze medal	Sanne van Dijke	Netherlands
bronze medal	Michaela Polleres	Austria

Competition at external databases
- Links: IJF • JudoInside

The Women's 70 kg competition at the 2021 World Judo Championships was held on 10 June 2021.

== Results ==
=== Finals ===
Semi-finals
(Croatia) Barbara Matić	01
(Austria) Michaela Polleres	00
(Netherlands) Sanne van Dijke	01
(Japan) Yoko Ono	11

Final
(Croatia) Barbara Matić	01
(Japan) Yoko Ono	00

=== Repechage ===
Repechage
(Germany) Miriam Butkereit	10
(Australia) Aoife Coughlan	00

Third place
(Germany) Miriam Butkereit	00
(Netherlands) Sanne van Dijke	10

Repechage
(Republic of Ireland) Megan Fletcher	10
(Brazil) Maria Portela	00

Third place
(Republic of Ireland) Megan Fletcher	00
(Austria) Michaela Polleres	10

=== Pool A ===
First round
(Netherlands) Hilde Jager	10
(Kazakhstan) Zere Bektaskyzy	00
(Gabon) Karene Agono	00
(Georgia (country)) Mariam Tchanturia	10

Second round
(France) Marie-Ève Gahié	00
(Netherlands) Hilde Jager	10
(Jamaica) Ebony Drysdale-Daley	00
(Croatia) Barbara Matić	10
(Germany) Miriam Butkereit	10
(Georgia (country)) Mariam Tchanturia	00
(Greece) Elisavet Teltsidou	00
(Venezuela) Elvismar Rodríguez	10

Third round
(Netherlands) Hilde Jager	00
(Croatia) Barbara Matić	01
(Germany) Miriam Butkereit	10
(Venezuela) Elvismar Rodríguez	00

Quarterfinals
(Croatia) Barbara Matić	10
(Germany) Miriam Butkereit	00

=== Pool B ===
First round
(Morocco) Assmaa Niang	00
(Spain) María Bernabéu	01

Second round
(Austria) Michaela Polleres	10
(Spain) María Bernabéu	00
(South Korea) Kim Seong-yeon	01
(Mongolia) Tserendulamyn Enkhchimeg	00
(Germany) Giovanna Scoccimarro	10
(Uzbekistan) Gulnoza Matniyazova	01
(Bahrain) Asma Al-Rebai	00
(Australia) Aoife Coughlan	10

Third round
(Austria) Michaela Polleres	10
(South Korea) Kim Seong-yeon	00
(Germany) Giovanna Scoccimarro	00
(Australia) Aoife Coughlan	10

Quarterfinals
(Austria) Michaela Polleres	10
(Australia) Aoife Coughlan	00

=== Pool C ===
First round
(Hungary) Szabina Gercsák	10
(Slovenia) Anka Pogačnik	01

Second round
(Netherlands) Sanne van Dijke	10
(United States) Chantal Wright	00
(Hungary) Szabina Gercsák	10
(Cameroon) Ayuk Arrey	00
(Portugal) Bárbara Timo	01
(Kazakhstan) Moldir Narynova	00
(Republic of Ireland) Megan Fletcher	10
(South Africa) Anastasiya-Alexandra Nenova	00

Third round
(Netherlands) Sanne van Dijke	10
(Hungary) Szabina Gercsák	00
(Portugal) Bárbara Timo	01
(Republic of Ireland) Megan Fletcher	10

Quarterfinals
(Netherlands) Sanne van Dijke	11
(Republic of Ireland) Megan Fletcher	00

=== Pool D ===
First round
(Ukraine) Nataliia Chystiakova	10
(Kiribati) Kinaua Biribo	00
(Croatia) Lara Cvjetko	00
(Italy) Alice Bellandi	10

Second round
(Japan) Yoko Ono	10
(Ukraine) Nataliia Chystiakova	00
(Puerto Rico) María Pérez	00
(United Kingdom) Gemma Howell	10
(Brazil) Maria Portela	01
(Italy) Alice Bellandi	00
Oula Dahouk	00
(Tunisia) Nihel Bouchoucha	10

Third round
(Japan) Yoko Ono	10
(United Kingdom) Gemma Howell	00
(Brazil) Maria Portela	10
(Tunisia) Nihel Bouchoucha	00

Quarterfinals
(Japan) Yoko Ono	10
(Brazil) Maria Portela	00

== Prize money ==
The sums listed bring the total prizes awarded to 57,000€ for the individual event.

Medal	Total	Judoka	Coach
Gold	26,000€	20,800€	5,200€
Silver	15,000€	12,000€	3,000€
Bronze	8,000€	6,400€	1,600€
