= Benjamin Axus =

French judoka (born 1994)

Personal information
- Nationality: French
- Born: 28 September 1994 (age 31) Versailles
- Occupation: Judoka

Sport
- Country: France
- Sport: Judo
- Weight class: –73 kg

Achievements and titles
- World Champ.: R16 (2018)
- European Champ.: R16 (2022)
Medal record
Men's judo
Representing France
World Championships
Silver medal – second place	2018 Baku	Mixed team
Silver medal – second place	2022 Tashkent	Mixed team
European Championships
Gold medal – first place	2022 Mulhouse	Mixed team
IJF Grand Slam
Bronze medal – third place	2017 Ekaterinburg	‍–‍73 kg
Bronze medal – third place	2022 Paris	‍–‍73 kg
IJF Grand Prix
Silver medal – second place	2022 Perth	‍–‍73 kg
Bronze medal – third place	2023 Dushanbe	‍–‍73 kg
European Junior Championships
Gold medal – first place	2014 Bucharest	‍–‍73 kg

Profile at external databases
- IJF: 17435
- JudoInside.com: 66661
- Updated on 4 June 2023

Benjamin Axus (born 28 September 1994) is a French judoka.

He participated at the 2018 World Judo Championships, winning a medal.

He won one of the bronze medals in his event at the 2022 Judo Grand Slam Paris held in Paris, France.

On 12 November 2022 he won a gold medal at the 2022 European Mixed Team Judo Championships as part of team France.
