= Yoshisada Yonezuka =

Olympic Judo coach

Personal information
- Born: May 19, 1937
- Died: October 18, 2014 (aged 77) Hackensack, New Jersey, U.S.

Yoshisada Yonezuka (米塚 義定, Yonezuka Yoshisada; May 19, 1937 – October 18, 2014), was a Judo instructor and two time U.S. Olympic Judo Team coach.

== Personal life ==
He began training in track and sumo as a child. In 1954, he began to train in judo in high school and became the Northern Japan High School Champion in 1955. He entered Nihon University in 1956. His children includes a son, Nicolas Yonezuka and a daughter, Natacha Yonezuka-Gullo. Yonezuka died at Hackensack University Medical Center Hackensack, New Jersey, on October 18, 2014, of complications of Myelodysplastic syndrome, a rare form of blood cancer that resembles acute leukemia. A bone marrow drive was attempted to no avail.

== Martial arts career ==
After defeating nine 2nd degree blackbelts in succession at the Kodokan, he received a special promotion to 3rd degree black belt. He also began studying Shorinji Kempo and several styles of karate including wado ryu, and shito-ryu.

In 1959, he was a member of the university team winning the team championship. The following year he graduated Nihon University majoring in business. Following his childhood dream he went to the United States and began teaching judo at West Point Military Academy. In 1960 he moved to the United States. In 1962, Yonezuka founded the Cranford Judo Karate Center. He was also the founding coach of the Judo program at New Jersey Institute of Technology (then known as Newark College of Engineering) during the mid-60s. Additionally, he served as an instructor at the Jerome Mackey judo schools.

Yonezuka was twice chosen to serve as head coach of the United States at the Olympics Judo Team, and he coached three U.S. World Judo Championships Teams as well. Yonezuka believed that the Japanese could not accept that Judo became more like wrestling and less of a martial art. He is also founder, former President and former Executive Director of the U.S. Sumo Federation.

Since 1995 he held an 8th degree black belt in judo from the Kodokan Judo Institute in Japan, and an 8th degree black belt in karate. In 2007 he was awarded the rank of kudan by the United States Judo Federation (USJF), which is the ninth degree black belt in judo, becoming one of only several American residents to be honored with the second highest judo degree. Additionally he appeared on the cover of the United States Judo Federation Magazine along with Allen Coage in 1977. He would also serve as coach of sumo wrestler Emanuel Yarbrough.
