= Ahn Joon-sung =

South Korean judoka (born 1997)

Personal information
- Born: 25 August 1997 (age 28)
- Occupation: Judoka
- Height: 1.73 m (5 ft 8 in)

Sport
- Country: South Korea
- Sport: Judo
- Weight class: ‍–‍73 kg

Achievements and titles
- World Champ.: R16 (2018)
Medal record
Men's judo
Representing South Korea
World Championships
Bronze medal – third place	2018 Baku	Mixed team
IJF Grand Slam
Bronze medal – third place	2017 Tokyo	‍–‍73 kg

Profile at external databases
- IJF: 35672
- JudoInside.com: 108079
- Updated on 26 November 2022

Ahn Joon-sung (born 25 August 1997) is a South Korean judoka.

Ahn participated in the Mixed team event at the 2018 World Judo Championships, winning a medal.
