= Yūsuke Kobayashi (judoka) =

Japanese judoka (born 1993)

Personal information
- Born: 12 August 1993 (age 32)
- Occupation: Judoka

Sport
- Country: Japan
- Sport: Judo
- Weight class: ‍–‍90 kg

Achievements and titles
- Asian Champ.: (silver) (2016)
Medal record
Men's judo
Representing Japan
Asian Championships
Silver medal – second place	2016 Tashkent	‍–‍90 kg
IJF Grand Slam
Silver medal – second place	2017 Tokyo	‍–‍90 kg
IJF Grand Prix
Bronze medal – third place	2017 Zagreb	‍–‍90 kg
Asian Junior Championships
Gold medal – first place	2012 Taipei	‍–‍90 kg

Profile at external databases
- IJF: 14816
- JudoInside.com: 76925
- Updated on 26 November 2022

Yūsuke Kobayashi (born 12 August 1993) is a Japanese judoka.

Kobayashi is the silver medalist of the 2017 Judo Grand Slam Tokyo in the ‍–‍90 kg category.
