= Jeong Hye-jin =

South Korean judoka (born 1995)

Personal information
- Nationality: South Korean
- Born: 18 April 1995 (age 31)
- Occupation: Judoka
- Height: 1.70 m (5 ft 7 in)
- Weight: 70 kg (154 lb)

Sport
- Country: South Korea
- Sport: Judo
- Weight class: –70 kg
Medal record
World Championships
Bronze medal – third place	2018 Baku	Mixed team
World Cadets Championships
Bronze medal – third place	2011 Kyiv	–70 kg

Profile at external databases
- JudoInside.com: 79730

Jeong Hye-jin (born 18 April 1995) is a South Korean judoka.

She participated at the 2018 World Judo Championships, winning a medal.
