= An Chang-rim =

South Korean judoka (born 1994)

An Changrim
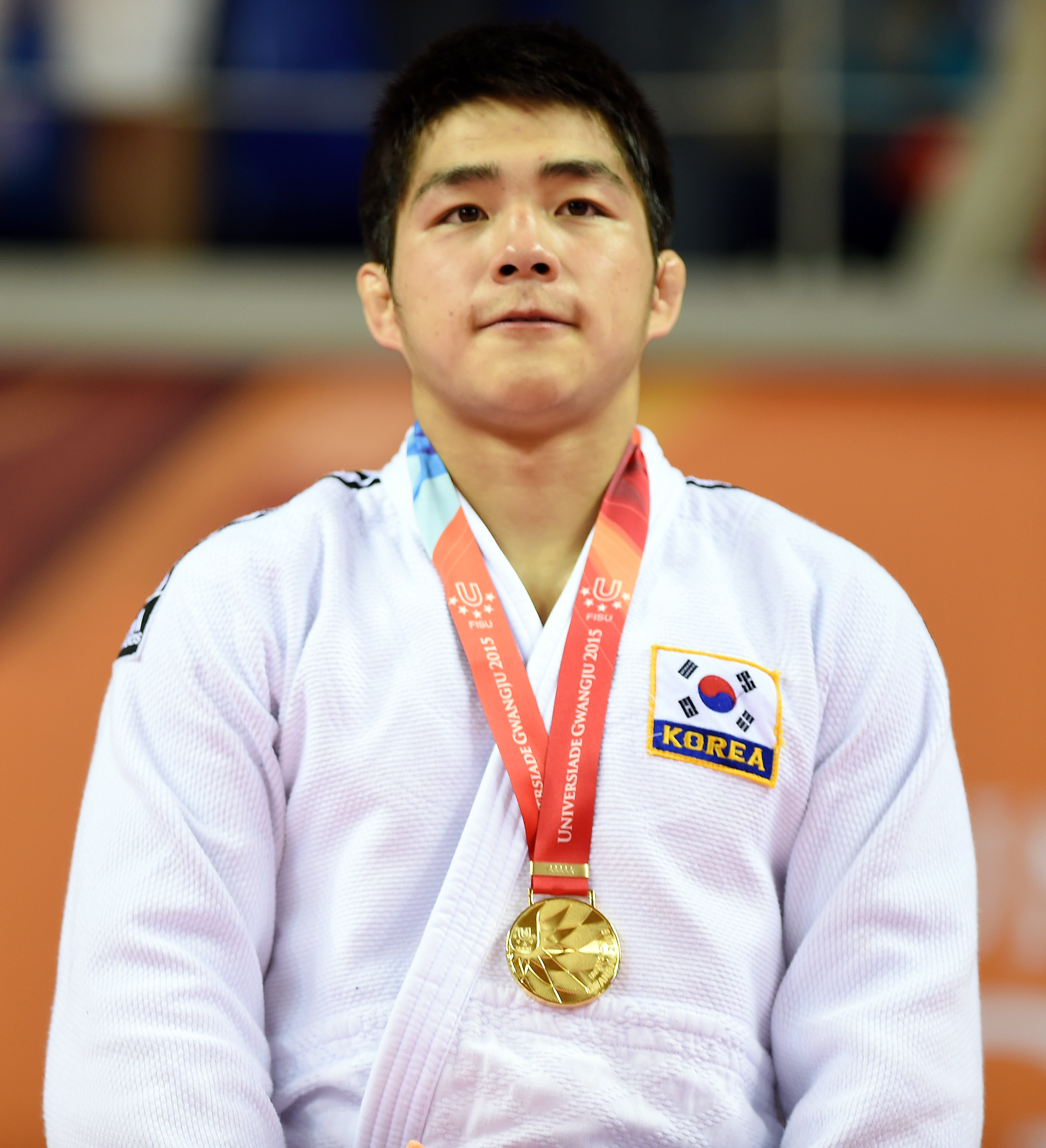
- An in 2015

Personal information
- Native name: 안창림 安昌林
- Nationality: South Korean
- Born: 2 March 1994 (age 32) Kyoto, Japan
- Home town: Seoul, South Korea
- Education: University of Tsukuba; Yongin University
- Occupation: Judoka
- Height: 170 cm (5 ft 7 in)
- Website: an-changrim.com

Sport
- Country: South Korea
- Sport: Judo
- Weight class: –73 kg
- Rank: 2nd dan black belt
- Team: South Korea National Team; Suwon City Hall
- Coached by: Song Dae-nam
- Retired: 5 December 2021

Achievements and titles
- Olympic Games: (bronze) (2020)
- World Champ.: (2018)
- Asian Champ.: (gold) (2015, 2017, 2021)
Medal record
Men's judo
Representing South Korea
Olympic Games
Bronze medal – third place	2020 Tokyo	‍–‍73 kg
World Championships
Gold medal – first place	2018 Baku	‍–‍73 kg
Bronze medal – third place	2015 Astana	‍–‍73 kg
Bronze medal – third place	2017 Budapest	‍–‍73 kg
Asian Games
Silver medal – second place	2018 Jakarta	‍–‍73 kg
Asian Championships
Gold medal – first place	2015 Kuwait City	‍–‍73 kg
Gold medal – first place	2017 Hong Kong	‍–‍73 kg
Gold medal – first place	2021 Bishkek	‍–‍73 kg
Silver medal – second place	2019 Fujairah	‍–‍73 kg
World Masters
Gold medal – first place	2021 Doha	‍–‍73 kg
Bronze medal – third place	2018 Guangzhou	‍–‍73 kg
IJF Grand Slam
Gold medal – first place	2015 Abu Dhabi	‍–‍73 kg
Gold medal – first place	2016 Paris	‍–‍73 kg
Silver medal – second place	2015 Tokyo	‍–‍73 kg
Silver medal – second place	2017 Paris	‍–‍73 kg
Silver medal – second place	2020 Düsseldorf	‍–‍73 kg
Bronze medal – third place	2014 Tokyo	‍–‍73 kg
Bronze medal – third place	2018 Paris	‍–‍73 kg
IJF Grand Prix
Gold medal – first place	2014 Jeju	‍–‍73 kg
Gold medal – first place	2015 Jeju	‍–‍73 kg
Gold medal – first place	2018 Hohhot	‍–‍73 kg
Gold medal – first place	2019 Antalya	‍–‍73 kg
Silver medal – second place	2018 Antalya	‍–‍73 kg
Bronze medal – third place	2015 Düsseldorf	‍–‍73 kg
Bronze medal – third place	2016 Düsseldorf	‍–‍73 kg
World Juniors Championships
Gold medal – first place	2014 Fort Lauderdale	‍–‍73 kg
Summer Universiade
Gold medal – first place	2015 Gwangju	‍–‍73 kg

Profile at external databases
- IJF: 16921
- JudoInside.com: 92236
- Updated on 23 May 2023

An Chang-rim (Korean: 안창림; Hanja: 安昌林; born 2 March 1994) is a South Korean retired judoka.

An was the world champion in the lightweight division in 2018, He began his rise as one of judo's top lightweights by becoming junior World Champion. It was followed by a two-year podium streak, including wins at the prestigious Grand Slam Abu Dhabi and Tokyo. He is known for his physical, aggressive style of fighting, and is a versatile stylist of seoi nage.

An won a bronze medal at the 2015 World Championships. South Korea's premier lightweight, he represented Korea at the 2016 Olympics. He was also seeded first at the Olympics. He is currently ranked fourth in the world. In December 2021 he officially announced retirement.

== Early life ==
An was born to third generation Zainichi Korean parents. He wanted to compete for South Korea from a young age, saying "I was never discriminated against here [in South Korea]."

An began judo in first grade. He attended Kyoto City Hachijo Junior High School, where he began to compete. He was unable to compete internationally for Japan because he refused naturalization.

Before moving to Korea, An was a student at the University of Tsukuba, where he trained and was teammates with 2015 World Champion Takanori Nagase. He was the 2013 All Japan University lightweight champion. He currently attends and trains at Yong In University.

== Career ==
=== 2014 World Judo Championships ===
"There was no pressure for me. I didn't expect anything at all. I tried the best I could but juniors level is different. I have experience there. Senior fighters have more experience and strength." An on losing in his second fight in his first World Championships

An began his competitive senior career in 2014, representing Korea at the 2014 World Judo Championships. He competed in the −73 kg category, after local lightweight number one Wang Ki-chun missed the tournament. He lost in the second round to Israeli champion Sagi Muki.

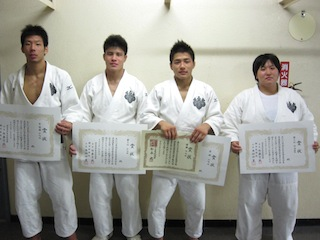
An Chang-rim (second from the right) after winning the 2013 All Japan University Championships. He was teammates with Takanori Nagase (left).

=== 2014 World Junior Judo Championships ===
I like to be challenged. The seeding doesn't matter to me.

— An on winning the World Junior Championships unranked

An had a breakthrough in his junior career, winning the 2014 World Junior Championships in Fort Lauderdale. He won against Japan's Yuji Yamamoto in the final, scoring two waza-aris for ippon.

=== 2014 Grand Prix Jeju ===
An won his first IJF circuit title at the 2014 Grand Prix in Jeju, beating established opponents such as 2008 European Champion Dirk Van Tichelt in the semi-finals, and future European Champion Sagi Muki in the finals, both by ippon.

=== 2014 Grand Slam Tokyo ===
An competed in his first Grand Slam in 2014, at the heart of judo in Tokyo. He lost to double world champion Shohei Ono in the quarter-finals, and Ono would prove to be a stumbling block later on in his career. He won his first Grand Slam medal against Rustam Orujov in the bronze medal contest, winning narrowly by yuko.

=== 2015 Grand Prix Dusseldorf ===
An again had a fairly successful outing at the Grand Prix in Düsseldorf, where he was guaranteed a medal by beating Muki by ippon in the quarter-finals. However, he was again faced against his budding rival Ono, and lost in the semi-finals. He won a bronze medal by defeating Victor Scvortov.

=== 2015 European Open Warsaw ===
An continued his medal-winning streak at the European Open in Warsaw, reaching the final after winning all his fights en-route by ippon. He faced his first opponent from Asia in the tournament with Mongolia's Odbayar Ganbataar, where Ganbataar threw him for ippon, therefore beating An to settle for silver.

=== 2015 Asian Judo Championships ===
An won his first continental title at the Asian Judo Championships in Kuwait City. He defeated Sharofiddin Boltaboev in just 49 seconds by ippon.

=== 2015 Universiade ===
An defeated all his opponents by ippon at home ground in Gwangju. He defeated Yamamoto again in the semi-final, and took gold against Ukraine's Dmytro Kanivets.

=== 2015 World Judo Championships ===
"They are both very strong and experienced fighters. I can't expect to beat them now. My focus is on the worlds and Olympics." – An in 2014 on succeeding Wang as Korea's top lightweight as the latter ascended to half-lightweight

An competed in his second world championships in Astana, Kazakhstan, and reached the semi-final. He was once again pitted against the eventual tournament winner Ono, and lost for the third time. Ono scored first with an uchi mata counter for waza-ari, and An leveled the scores by scoring waza-ari with a minute and a half to go. Ono sealed his win with an ushiro goshi, ending An's hopes of becoming Korea's third lightweight world champion, after Lee Won-hee and Wang.

He then went on to win by shido against Ganbataar in the bronze-medal contest, becoming one of South Korea's five individual medalists at the championships.

In the team competition, Korea faced Mongolia in the semi-finals. An faced Ganbataar and beat him for a second time in Astana with a seoi nage to win by ippon in just ten seconds. Korea won 4–1, and was set against Japan in the finals.

An's opponent in the team final was double world champion and the 2015 silver medalist Riki Nakaya. Japan was one up after former world champion Masashi Ebinuma beat current world champion An Baul, putting pressure on An. An beat Nakaya by ippon with his signature skill seoi nage. Korea eventually lost to Japan 3–2, and had to settle for silver.

=== 2015 Grand Slam Abu Dhabi ===
An won his first Grand Slam at Abu Dhabi, winning all his fights by ippon with the exception of the quarter-final against half-lightweight Olympic champion Lasha Shavdatuashvili. He beat Germany's Igor Wandtke for the gold medal.

=== 2015 Grand Prix Jeju ===
An had a re-match with van Tichelt again in the final for the second year running at the Grand Slam in Jeju. He defeated the Belgian once again by ippon.

=== 2015 Grand Slam Tokyo ===
"Two years ago... I was Hiroyuki-san's attendant. I intended to send him into retirement."

— An on facing former World Champion Akimoto in the final of the Grand Slam Tokyo

An faced his senior from the University of Tsukuba, world champion Hiroyuki Akimoto, in the final. After the match he said to The Japan News, "Two years ago at this event I was Hiroyuki-san's attendant. I intended to send him into retirement." He lost to Akimoto by waza-ari, settling for silver.

=== 2016 Grand Slam Paris ===
"I will win the Olympic final against Ono." – An on his ambitions at the 2016 Olympics

At his first outing to one of the IJF circuit's most prestigious events, An managed to win his second Grand Slam title. He had a re-match with Akimoto in the semi-final, and this time emerged victorious, winning by ippon and waza-ari. He defeated Russia's Denis Iartcev in the final. After winning the gold medal, An spoke to L'esprit du Judo, a French judo magazine. He answered their questions in Japanese, and was quoted saying, "I will win the Olympic final against Ono."

=== 2016 Grand Prix Dusseldorf ===
An again faced his rival Ono in the semi-final at the Grand Prix in Düsseldorf, and lost for the fourth time. He ended up winning bronze against Mongolia's Khadbataar Narankhuu.

=== 2018 Baku World Championship ===
An, for the first time, won the World Championship title. In the final he ended up going against his rival, Soichi Hashimoto from Japan. An beat Hashimoto with a Kosoto-gake which lead him to his first World Championship title.

=== 2021 ===
In 2021, he won the gold medal in his event at the 2021 Judo World Masters held in Doha, Qatar.

== Competitive record ==
Judo Record
Total	138
Wins	120 (87%)
Losses	18 (13%)

(as of 30 November 2019)
