= 2018 World Judo Championships =

Judo competition

Judo 2018 World Judo Championships
- Venue: National Gymnastics Arena
- Location: Baku, Azerbaijan
- Dates: 20–27 September 2018
- Competitors: 755 from 124 nations
- Total prize money: 998,000€

Champions
- Mixed team: Japan (2nd title)

Competition at external databases
- Links: IJF • EJU • JudoInside

The 2018 World Judo Championships were held between 20 and 27 September 2018 at National Gymnastics Arena in Baku, Azerbaijan.

== Schedule ==
All times are local (UTC+4).

Date	Starting time	Event
20 September	10:00	Men −60 kg
20 September	10:00	Women −48 kg
21 September	10:00	Men −66 kg
21 September	10:00	Women −52 kg
22 September	10:00	Men −73 kg
22 September	10:00	Women −57 kg
23 September	10:00	Men −81 kg
23 September	10:00	Women −63 kg
24 September	10:00	Men −90 kg
24 September	10:00	Women −70 kg
25 September	10:00	Men −100 kg
25 September	10:00	Women −78 kg
26 September	10:00	Men +100 kg
26 September	10:00	Women +78 kg
27 September	10:00	Mixed team

== Medal summary ==
=== Medal table ===
* Host nation (Azerbaijan)

Rank	Nation	Gold	Silver	Bronze	Total
1	Japan (JPN)	8	5	4	17
2	South Korea (KOR)	2	0	1	3
3	France (FRA)	1	2	2	5
4	Georgia (GEO)	1	1	1	3
5	Iran (IRN)	1	0	1	2
5	Ukraine (UKR)	1	0	1	2
7	Spain (ESP)	1	0	0	1
8	Cuba (CUB)	0	2	0	2
9	Russia (RUS)	0	1	3	4
10	Netherlands (NED)	0	1	2	3
11	Azerbaijan (AZE)*	0	1	1	2
11	Kazakhstan (KAZ)	0	1	1	2
13	Great Britain (GBR)	0	1	0	1
14	Mongolia (MGL)	0	0	3	3
15	Turkey (TUR)	0	0	2	2
16	Argentina (ARG)	0	0	1	1
16	Bosnia and Herzegovina (BIH)	0	0	1	1
16	Brazil (BRA)	0	0	1	1
16	Canada (CAN)	0	0	1	1
16	Colombia (COL)	0	0	1	1
16	Germany (GER)	0	0	1	1
16	Korea (KOR)	0	0	1	1
16	Slovenia (SLO)	0	0	1	1
Totals (23 entries)		15	15	30	60

=== Men's events ===
Event	Gold	Silver	Bronze
Extra-lightweight (60 kg)	Naohisa Takato; Japan	Robert Mshvidobadze; Russia	Ryuju Nagayama; Japan
Extra-lightweight (60 kg)	Naohisa Takato; Japan	Robert Mshvidobadze; Russia	Amiran Papinashvili; Georgia
Half-lightweight (66 kg)	Hifumi Abe; Japan	Yerlan Serikzhanov; Kazakhstan	An Baul; South Korea
Half-lightweight (66 kg)	Hifumi Abe; Japan	Yerlan Serikzhanov; Kazakhstan	Georgii Zantaraia; Ukraine
Lightweight (73 kg)	An Chang-rim; South Korea	Soichi Hashimoto; Japan	Mohammad Mohammadi; Iran
Lightweight (73 kg)	An Chang-rim; South Korea	Soichi Hashimoto; Japan	Hidayat Heydarov; Azerbaijan
Half-middleweight (81 kg)	Saeid Mollaei; Iran	Sotaro Fujiwara; Japan	Alexander Wieczerzak; Germany
Half-middleweight (81 kg)	Saeid Mollaei; Iran	Sotaro Fujiwara; Japan	Vedat Albayrak; Turkey
Middleweight (90 kg)	Nikoloz Sherazadishvili; Spain	Iván Felipe Silva Morales; Cuba	Kenta Nagasawa; Japan
Middleweight (90 kg)	Nikoloz Sherazadishvili; Spain	Iván Felipe Silva Morales; Cuba	Axel Clerget; France
Half-heavyweight (100 kg)	Cho Gu-ham; South Korea	Varlam Liparteliani; Georgia	Niyaz Ilyasov; Russia
Half-heavyweight (100 kg)	Cho Gu-ham; South Korea	Varlam Liparteliani; Georgia	Lkhagvasürengiin Otgonbaatar; Mongolia
Heavyweight (+100 kg)	Guram Tushishvili; Georgia	Ushangi Kokauri; Azerbaijan	Hisayoshi Harasawa; Japan
Heavyweight (+100 kg)	Guram Tushishvili; Georgia	Ushangi Kokauri; Azerbaijan	Ölziibayaryn Düürenbayar; Mongolia

=== Women's events ===
Event	Gold	Silver	Bronze
Extra-lightweight (48 kg)	Daria Bilodid; Ukraine	Funa Tonaki; Japan	Paula Pareto; Argentina
Extra-lightweight (48 kg)	Daria Bilodid; Ukraine	Funa Tonaki; Japan	Galbadrakhyn Otgontsetseg; Kazakhstan
Half-lightweight (52 kg)	Uta Abe; Japan	Ai Shishime; Japan	Érika Miranda; Brazil
Half-lightweight (52 kg)	Uta Abe; Japan	Ai Shishime; Japan	Amandine Buchard; France
Lightweight (57 kg)	Tsukasa Yoshida; Japan	Nekoda Smythe-Davis; Great Britain	Christa Deguchi; Canada
Lightweight (57 kg)	Tsukasa Yoshida; Japan	Nekoda Smythe-Davis; Great Britain	Sumiya Dorjsuren; Mongolia
Half-middleweight (63 kg)	Clarisse Agbegnenou; France	Miku Tashiro; Japan	Tina Trstenjak; Slovenia
Half-middleweight (63 kg)	Clarisse Agbegnenou; France	Miku Tashiro; Japan	Juul Franssen; Netherlands
Middleweight (70 kg)	Chizuru Arai; Japan	Marie-Ève Gahié; France	Yoko Ono; Japan
Middleweight (70 kg)	Chizuru Arai; Japan	Marie-Ève Gahié; France	Yuri Alvear; Colombia
Half-heavyweight (78 kg)	Shori Hamada; Japan	Guusje Steenhuis; Netherlands	Marhinde Verkerk; Netherlands
Half-heavyweight (78 kg)	Shori Hamada; Japan	Guusje Steenhuis; Netherlands	Aleksandra Babintseva; Russia
Heavyweight (+78 kg)	Sarah Asahina; Japan	Idalys Ortiz; Cuba	Larisa Cerić; Bosnia and Herzegovina
Heavyweight (+78 kg)	Sarah Asahina; Japan	Idalys Ortiz; Cuba	Kayra Sayit; Turkey

=== Mixed events ===
Event	Gold	Silver	Bronze
Mixed team	Japan; Chizuru Arai; Sarah Asahina; Hisayoshi Harasawa; Soichi Hashimoto; Shoichiro Mukai; Kenta Nagasawa; Yusei Ogawa; Yoko Ono; Akira Sone; Momo Tamaoki; Arata Tatsukawa; Tsukasa Yoshida	France; Clarisse Agbegnenou; Benjamin Axus; Guillaume Chaine; Axel Clerget; Aurelien Diesse; Marie-Ève Gahié; Priscilla Gneto; Alexandre Iddir; Anne Fatoumata M'Bairo; Cyrille Maret; Hélène Receveaux; Audrey Tcheuméo	Russia; Kamila Badurova; Ksenia Chibisova; Anzhela Gasparian; Natalia Golomidova; Mikhail Igolnikov; Khusen Khalmurzaev; Anastasiia Konkina; Musa Mogushkov; Alena Prokopenko; Inal Tasoev; Denis Yartsev; Kazbek Zankishiev
Mixed team	Japan; Chizuru Arai; Sarah Asahina; Hisayoshi Harasawa; Soichi Hashimoto; Shoichiro Mukai; Kenta Nagasawa; Yusei Ogawa; Yoko Ono; Akira Sone; Momo Tamaoki; Arata Tatsukawa; Tsukasa Yoshida	France; Clarisse Agbegnenou; Benjamin Axus; Guillaume Chaine; Axel Clerget; Aurelien Diesse; Marie-Ève Gahié; Priscilla Gneto; Alexandre Iddir; Anne Fatoumata M'Bairo; Cyrille Maret; Hélène Receveaux; Audrey Tcheuméo	Korea; An Ba-ul; An Chang-rim; Ahn Joon-sung; Cho Gu-ham; Choi In-hyuk; Gwak Dong-han; Han Mi-jin; Jeong Hye-jin; Kim Chol-gwang; Kim Ji-jeong; Kim Ji-su; Kim Jin-a; Kim Min-jeong; Kim Min-jong; Kwon Sun-yong; Kwon You-jeong; Lee Seung-soo; Ri Hyo-sun

== Prize money ==
The sums written are per medalist, bringing the total prizes awarded to 798,000€ for the individual events and 200,000€ for the team event. (retrieved from:)

Medal	Individual			Mixed team		
Medal	Total	Judoka	Coach	Total	Judoka	Coach
Gold	26,000€	20,800€	5,200€	90,000€	72,000€	18,000€
Silver	15,000€	12,000€	3,000€	60,000€	48,000€	12,000€
Bronze	8,000€	6,400€	1,600€	25,000€	20,000€	5,000€
