= Kim Chol-gwang =

North Korean judoka (born 1996)

Personal information
- Born: 29 January 1996 (age 30)
- Occupation: Judoka

Sport
- Country: North Korea
- Sport: Judo
- Weight class: ‍–‍73 kg

Achievements and titles
- World Champ.: R64 (2017, 2024)
- Asian Champ.: (bronze) (2024)
Medal record
Men's judo
Representing Korea
World Championships
Bronze medal – third place	2018 Baku	Mixed team
Representing North Korea
Asian Championships
Bronze medal – third place	2024 Hong Kong	‍–‍73 kg
IJF Grand Prix
Silver medal – second place	2016 Samsun	‍–‍73 kg
Bronze medal – third place	2015 Qingdao	‍–‍73 kg
Asian Cadet Championships
Bronze medal – third place	2013 Hainan	‍–‍66 kg
Asian Youth Games
Bronze medal – third place	2013 Nanjing	‍–‍66 kg
Summer Universiade
Bronze medal – third place	2019 Naples	‍–‍73 kg

Profile at external databases
- IJF: 28717
- JudoInside.com: 46017
- Updated on 20 May 2024

Kim Chol-gwang (born 29 January 1996) is a North Korean judoka.

Kim participated at the 2018 World Judo Championships, winning a medal.

In 2019, Kim represented North Korea at the 2019 Summer Universiade in Naples, Italy and he won one of the bronze medals in the men's 73 kg event.
