= Zhansay Smagulov =

Kazakhstani judoka (born 1992)

Personal information
- Born: 26 September 1992 (age 33)
- Occupation: Judoka

Sport
- Country: Kazakhstan
- Sport: Judo
- Weight class: ‍–‍73 kg

Achievements and titles
- Olympic Games: R16 (2020)
- World Champ.: 7th (2018)
- Asian Champ.: (bronze) (2017)
Medal record
Men's judo
Representing Kazakhstan
Asian Championships
Bronze medal – third place	2017 Hong Kong	‍–‍73 kg
IJF Grand Slam
Silver medal – second place	2020 Paris	‍–‍73 kg
Silver medal – second place	2021 Tashkent	‍–‍73 kg
Bronze medal – third place	2022 Tel Aviv	‍–‍73 kg
IJF Grand Prix
Gold medal – first place	2015 Budapest	‍–‍66 kg
Gold medal – first place	2017 Tashkent	‍–‍73 kg
Gold medal – first place	2018 Tunis	‍–‍73 kg
Silver medal – second place	2014 Astana	‍–‍66 kg
Silver medal – second place	2016 Almaty	‍–‍66 kg
Silver medal – second place	2023 Almada	‍–‍73 kg
Bronze medal – third place	2016 Tbilisi	‍–‍66 kg
Bronze medal – third place	2017 Tbilisi	‍–‍73 kg

Profile at external databases
- IJF: 15186
- JudoInside.com: 38544
- Updated on 28 January 2023

Zhansay Smagulov (born 26 September 1992) is a Kazakhstani judoka. He competed at the 2016 Summer Olympics in Rio de Janeiro, in the men's 66 kg.

Smagulov won one of the bronze medals in his event at the 2022 Judo Grand Slam Tel Aviv held in Tel Aviv, Israel.
