= Arthur Margelidon =

Canadian judoka (born 1993)

Personal information
- Nationality: Canadian
- Born: 12 October 1993 (age 32) Paris, France
- Occupation: Judoka

Sport
- Country: Canada
- Sport: Judo
- Weight class: ‍–‍73 kg
- Retired: 4 May 2026

Achievements and titles
- Olympic Games: 5th (2020)
- World Champ.: 5th (2023)
- Pan American Champ.: (gold) (2016, 2024)
Medal record
Men's judo
Representing Canada
Pan American Games
Bronze medal – third place	2015 Toronto	‍–‍73 kg
Pan American Championships
Gold medal – first place	2016 Havana	‍–‍73 kg
Gold medal – first place	2024 Rio de Janeiro	‍–‍73 kg
Silver medal – second place	2019 Lima	‍–‍73 kg
Silver medal – second place	2023 Calgary	‍–‍73 kg
Bronze medal – third place	2015 Edmonton	‍–‍73 kg
World Masters
Silver medal – second place	2018 Guangzhou	‍–‍73 kg
Bronze medal – third place	2022 Jerusalem	‍–‍73 kg
IJF Grand Slam
Silver medal – second place	2017 Tokyo	‍–‍73 kg
Silver medal – second place	2019 Abu Dhabi	‍–‍73 kg
Silver medal – second place	2021 Tbilisi	‍–‍73 kg
Silver medal – second place	2022 Baku	‍–‍73 kg
Bronze medal – third place	2020 Budapest	‍–‍73 kg
Bronze medal – third place	2021 Antalya	‍–‍73 kg
Bronze medal – third place	2024 Baku	‍–‍73 kg
IJF Grand Prix
Silver medal – second place	2017 Hohhot	‍–‍73 kg
Silver medal – second place	2019 Zagreb	‍–‍73 kg
Bronze medal – third place	2018 Budapest	‍–‍73 kg
Bronze medal – third place	2018 Cancún	‍–‍73 kg
Bronze medal – third place	2019 Hohhot	‍–‍73 kg
Pan American Junior Championships
Silver medal – second place	2010 Buena Vista	‍–‍73 kg

Profile at external databases
- IJF: 9172
- JudoInside.com: 58110
- Updated on 6 May 2026

Arthur Margelidon (born 12 October 1993, in Paris, France) is a Canadian retired judoka who competed primarily in the men's 73 kg category.

== Career ==
Margelidon won the bronze medal at the 2015 Pan American Games in Toronto, and the gold medal at the 2016 Pan American Judo Championships in Havana.

In June 2016, he was selected for Canada's Olympic team, but he had to withdraw after he injured his arm. In June 2021, Margelidon was named to Canada's 2020 Olympic team. Margelidon would go on to finish in fifth place, one victory away from a bronze medal.

He lost his bronze medal match in the men's 73 kg event at the 2023 World Judo Championships held in Doha, Qatar.

== See also ==
- Judo in Quebec
- Judo in Canada
- List of Canadian judoka
