= Giyosjon Boboev =

Uzbek judoka (born 1993)

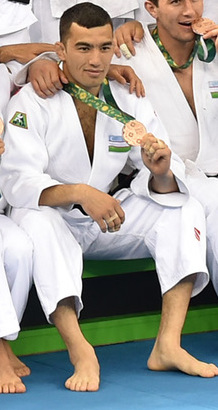

Personal information
- Born: 12 May 1993 (age 33)
- Occupation: Judoka

Sport
- Country: Uzbekistan
- Sport: Judo
- Weight class: ‍–‍73 kg

Achievements and titles
- World Champ.: R32 (2017)
- Asian Champ.: 7th (2018)
Medal record
Men's judo
Representing Uzbekistan
IJF Grand Slam
Silver medal – second place	2016 Baku	‍–‍73 kg
Bronze medal – third place	2016 Tokyo	‍–‍73 kg
IJF Grand Prix
Gold medal – first place	2017 Tbilisi	‍–‍73 kg
Silver medal – second place	2016 Tashkent	‍–‍73 kg
Silver medal – second place	2017 Tashkent	‍–‍73 kg
Bronze medal – third place	2015 Tashkent	‍–‍73 kg
Asian Junior Championships
Silver medal – second place	2013 Hainan	‍–‍73 kg

Profile at external databases
- IJF: 14790
- JudoInside.com: 42266
- Updated on 24 November 2022

Giyosjon Boboev (born 12 May 1993) is an Uzbek judoka.

Boboev is the gold medalist of the 2017 Judo Grand Prix Tbilisi in the ‍–‍73 kg category.
