= Tsend-Ochiryn Tsogtbaatar =

Mongolian judoka (born 1996)

Tsogtbaatar Tsend-Ochir
Personal information
- Native name: Цэнд-Очирын Цогтбаатар
- Nationality: Mongolia
- Born: 16 March 1996 (age 30) Bayankhongor, Mongolia
- Occupation: Judoka
- Height: 170 cm (5 ft 7 in)
- Website: Instagram Profile

Sport
- Country: Mongolia
- Sport: Judo
- Weight class: ‍–‍73 kg
- Club: Suld Sport Khoroo

Achievements and titles
- Olympic Games: (bronze) (2020)
- World Champ.: (gold) (2022)
- Asian Champ.: (gold) (2019)
- Highest world ranking: 1^{st}
Medal record
Men's judo
Representing Mongolia
Olympic Games
Bronze medal – third place	2020 Tokyo	‍–‍73 kg
World Championships
Gold medal – first place	2022 Tashkent	‍–‍73 kg
Asian Games
Bronze medal – third place	2022 Hangzhou	‍–‍73 kg
Bronze medal – third place	2022 Hangzhou	Mixed team
Asian Championships
Gold medal – first place	2019 Fujairah	‍–‍73 kg
Bronze medal – third place	2016 Tashkent	‍–‍60 kg
IJF Grand Slam
Gold medal – first place	2018 Ekaterinburg	‍–‍73 kg
Gold medal – first place	2021 Tashkent	‍–‍73 kg
Gold medal – first place	2021 Tbilisi	‍–‍73 kg
Gold medal – first place	2021 Abu Dhabi	‍–‍73 kg
Silver medal – second place	2015 Abu Dhabi	‍–‍60 kg
Silver medal – second place	2019 Paris	‍–‍73 kg
Silver medal – second place	2022 Ulaanbaatar	‍–‍73 kg
Silver medal – second place	2023 Antalya	‍–‍73 kg
Bronze medal – third place	2018 Paris	‍–‍73 kg
Bronze medal – third place	2020 Paris	‍–‍73 kg
Bronze medal – third place	2020 Düsseldorf	‍–‍73 kg
Bronze medal – third place	2021 Baku	‍–‍73 kg
Bronze medal – third place	2022 Paris	‍–‍73 kg
IJF Grand Prix
Bronze medal – third place	2015 Samsun	‍–‍60 kg
Bronze medal – third place	2015 Ulaanbaatar	‍–‍60 kg
Bronze medal – third place	2017 The Hague	‍–‍73 kg
Bronze medal – third place	2018 Hohhot	‍–‍73 kg
World Juniors Championships
Silver medal – second place	2014 Fort Lauderdale	‍–‍60 kg
Silver medal – second place	2015 Abu Dhabi	‍–‍60 kg
Asian Junior Championships
Silver medal – second place	2014 Hong Kong	‍–‍66 kg
World Cadets Championships
Bronze medal – third place	2013 Miami	‍–‍60 kg
Asian Cadet Championships
Silver medal – second place	2013 Hainan	‍–‍60 kg
Asian Cadet Championships
Bronze medal – third place	2012 Taipei	‍–‍50 kg

Profile at external databases
- IJF: 13854
- JudoInside.com: 33070
- Updated on 27 September 2023

Tsend-Ochiryn Tsogtbaatar (Mongolian: Цэнд-Очирын Цогтбаатар; born 16 March 1996) is a Mongolian judoka.

He competed at the 2020 Summer Olympics in Tokyo, in the men's 73 kg and won the bronze medal. Prior to the Olympics, he fought the World Junior Championship in 2014 and 2015. He won a bronze medal at the World Cadet Championships in 2013. In 2015, he reached the final of the Abu Dhabi Grand Slam.

At the 2021 Judo Grand Slam Abu Dhabi held in Abu Dhabi, United Arab Emirates, he won the gold medal in his event. He won one of the bronze medals in his event at the 2022 Judo Grand Slam Paris held in Paris, France.
