= Australia at the 2026 Commonwealth Games =

- Flag of Australia
- CG code: AUS
- CGA: Commonwealth Games Australia
- Website: commonwealthgames.com.au

in Glasgow, Scotland 23 July – 2 August 2026
- Competitors: 262 in 10 sports
- Flag bearer (opening): Nina Kennedy
- Baton bearer: Timothy Hodge
- Flag bearer (closing): Georgia Baker
- Medals Ranked 1st: Gold 70 Silver 45 Bronze 56 Total 171

Commonwealth Games appearances (overview)
- 1930; 1934; 1938; 1950; 1954; 1958; 1962; 1966; 1970; 1974; 1978; 1982; 1986; 1990; 1994; 1998; 2002; 2006; 2010; 2014; 2018; 2022; 2026; 2030

Australia competed at the 2026 Commonwealth Games in Glasgow, Scotland, between 23 July 2026 and 2 August 2026. It was Australia's 23rd appearance at the Commonwealth Games, having competed at every Games since their inception in 1930.

The Victorian State Government initially agreed to host the 2026 Games, but on 18 July 2023, Premier Dan Andrews and Deputy Premier Jacinta Allan announced the state government intended to cancel the 2026 Victorian Games, fifteen months after agreeing to host the Games. On 17 September 2024, it was announced that the Scottish Government had agreed to host the games with compensation from Victoria.

Pole vaulter Nina Kennedy was the country's opening ceremony flagbearer. Meanwhile, para swimmer Timothy Hodge was the baton bearer during the opening ceremony. Cyclist Georgia Baker served as the country's closing ceremony flagbearer.

== Administration ==
- Chef de mission - Petria Thomas
- Deputy Chef de Mission - Katrina Webb, Damian Brown, Matt Cowdrey
- General Manager Team Performance and Delivery - Robin O'Neill

== Medalists ==
Medal	Name	Sport	Event	Date
Gold	Lani Pallister	Swimming	Women's 400 metre freestyle	24 July
Gold	Jenna Jones	Swimming	Women's 100 metre freestyle S13	24 July
Gold	Jenna Forrester	Swimming	Women's 200 metre backstroke	24 July
Gold	Alex Saffy	Swimming	Men's 100 metre butterfly S10	24 July
Gold	Hannah Casey^{[a]} Brittany Castelluzzo^{[a]} Jessica Cole^{[a]} Meg Harris; Shayna Jack; Inez Miller^{[a]} Mollie O'Callaghan; Alexandria Perkins	Swimming	Women's 4 × 100 metre freestyle relay	24 July
Gold	Kyle Chalmers; Jamie Jack^{[a]} William Petric^{[a]} Edward Sommerville^{[a]} Flynn Southam; Kai Taylor; Matthew Temple^{[a]} Harrison Turner	Swimming	Men's 4 × 100 metre freestyle relay	24 July
Gold	Samuel Short	Swimming	Men's 400 metre freestyle	25 July
Gold	Mollie O'Callaghan	Swimming	Women's 200 metre freestyle	25 July
Gold	Alexandria Perkins	Swimming	Women's 50 metre butterfly	25 July
Gold	Georgia Godwin; Kate McDonald; Ruby Pass; Breanna Scott; Emily Whitehead	Artistic gymnastics	Women's team all-around	25 July
Gold	Samuel Williamson	Swimming	Men's 100 metre breaststroke	25 July
Gold	Hannah Casey^{[a]} Kyle Chalmers; Meg Harris; Shayna Jack; Alexandria Perkins^{[a]} Flynn Southam; Kai Taylor^{[a]} Harrison Turner^{[a]}	Swimming	Mixed 4 × 100 metre freestyle relay	25 July
Gold	Timothy Hodge	Swimming	Men's 100 metre backstroke S9	26 July
Gold	Iona Anderson	Swimming	Women's 100 metre backstroke	26 July
Gold	Cameron McEvoy	Swimming	Men's 50 metre freestyle	26 July
Gold	Lani Pallister	Swimming	Women's 1500 metre freestyle	26 July
Gold	William Petric^{[a]} Samuel Short; Brendon Smith^{[a]} Edward Sommerville; Kai Taylor; Harrison Turner; Elijah Winnington^{[a]}	Swimming	Men's 4 × 200 metre freestyle relay	26 July
Gold	Kate McDonald	Artistic gymnastics	Women's uneven bars	27 July
Gold	Jenna Forrester	Swimming	Women's 400 metre individual medley	27 July
Gold	Meg Harris	Swimming	Women's 100 metre freestyle	27 July
Gold	Beau Matthews	Swimming	Men's 100 metre breaststroke SB9	27 July
Gold	Alexandria Perkins	Swimming	Women's 100 metre butterfly	27 July
Gold	Samuel Williamson	Swimming	Men's 50 metre breaststroke	27 July
Gold	Samuel Short	Swimming	Men's 800 metre freestyle	27 July
Gold	Hannah Casey; Inez Miller; Mollie O'Callaghan; Lani Pallister	Swimming	Women's 4 × 200 metre freestyle relay	27 July
Gold	Rose Davies	Athletics	Women's 10,000 metres	27 July
Gold	Breanna Scott	Artistic gymnastics	Women's balance beam	28 July
Gold	Jesse Moore	Artistic gymnastics	Men's parallel bars	28 July
Gold	Kirralee Hayes	Swimming	Women's 100 metre freestyle S13	28 July
Gold	Flynn Southam	Swimming	Men's 100 metre freestyle	28 July
Gold	Jenna Forrester	Swimming	Women's 200 metre individual medley	28 July
Gold	Lani Pallister	Swimming	Women's 1500 metre freestyle	28 July
Gold	Iona Anderson; Brittany Castelluzzo^{[a]} Hannah Fredericks^{[a]} Meg Harris; Matthew Temple; Harrison Turner^{[a]} Sam Williamson	Swimming	Mixed 4 × 100 metre medley relay	28 July
Gold	Ky Robinson	Athletics	Men's 10,000 metres	28 July
Gold	Eleanor Patterson	Athletics	Women's high jump	28 July
Gold	Tomas Klein; Eithen Leard; Tom O'Neill-Thorne; Luke Pople	3x3 basketball	Men's wheelchair tournament	29 July
Gold	Amy Atwell; Emma Clarke; Lara McSpadden; Marena Whittle	3x3 basketball	Women's tournament	29 July
Gold	Eileen Cikamatana	Weightlifting	Women's 86 kg	29 July
Gold	Kai Taylor	Swimming	Men's 200 metre freestyle	29 July
Gold	Meg Harris	Swimming	Women's 50 metre freestyle	29 July
Gold	Kyle Chalmers	Swimming	Men's 50 metre butterfly	29 July
Gold	Ben Armbruster	Swimming	Men's 50 metre butterfly	29 July
Gold	Lakeisha Patterson	Swimming	Women's 100 metre freestyle S9	29 July
Gold	Brittany Castelluzzo	Swimming	Women's 200 metre butterfly	29 July
Gold	Samuel Short	Swimming	Men's 1500 metre freestyle	29 July
Gold	Iona Anderson; Brittany Castelluzzo^{[a]} Hannah Fredericks^{[a]} Meg Harris; Mollie O'Callaghan^{[a]} Alexandria Perkins; Sienna Toohey	Swimming	Women's 4 × 100 metre medley relay	29 July
Gold	Henry Allan; Ben Armbruster^{[a]} Isaac Cooper^{[a]} Jamie Jack^{[a]} Flynn Southam; Zac Stubblety-Cook^{[a]} Matthew Temple; Sam Williamson	Swimming	Men's 4 × 100 metre medley relay	29 July
Gold	Rose Davies	Athletics	Women's 5000 metres	30 July
Gold	Daniel Barber; Ryan Elliott; Leigh Hoffman	Track cycling	Men's team sprint	30 July
Gold	Georgia Baker; Claudia Marcks; Alyssa Polites; Felicity Wilson-Haffenden	Track cycling	Women's team pursuit	30 July
Gold	Tara Neyland	Track cycling	Women's individual pursuit C4-5	30 July
Gold	Isaac Beacroft	Athletics	Men's 10,000 metres walk	31 July
Gold	Georgia Baker	Track cycling	Women's scratch race	31 July
Gold	Oliver Bleddyn	Track cycling	Men's individual pursuit	31 July
Gold	Blake Agnoletto	Track cycling	Men's elimination race	31 July
Gold	Jemima Montag	Athletics	Women's 10,000 metres walk	1 August
Gold	Jye Dixon	Boxing	Men's 55 kg	1 August
Gold	Emma-Sue Greentree	Boxing	Women's 75 kg	1 August
Gold	Matthew Denny	Athletics	Men's discus throw	1 August
Gold	Rhiannon Clarke	Athletics	Women's 200 metres T38	1 August
Gold	Kurtis Marschall	Athletics	Men's pole vault	1 August
Gold	Mackenzie Little	Athletics	Women's javelin throw	1 August
Gold	Joshua Azzopardi; Rohan Browning; Christopher Ius^{[a]} Lachlan Kennedy; Calab Law	Athletics	Men's 4 × 100 metres relay	1 August
Gold	Abbey Caldwell	Athletics	Women's mile	1 August
Gold	Leigh Hoffman	Track cycling	Men's sprint	1 August
Gold	Damien Delgado; James Reynolds	Bowls	Men's pairs B6–8	2 August
Gold	Serena Bonnell; Louise Hoskins	Bowls	Women's pairs B6–8	2 August
Gold	Leigh Hoffman	Track cycling	Men's 1 km time trial	2 August
Gold	Alyssa Polites	Track cycling	Women's elimination race	2 August
Gold	Tara Neyland	Track cycling	Women's 1 km time trial C4-5	2 August
Silver	Jasmine Greenwood	Swimming	Women's 200 metre individual medley SM10	24 July
Silver	Col Pearse	Swimming	Men's 100 metre butterfly S10	24 July
Silver	Elijah Winnington	Swimming	Men's 400 metre freestyle	25 July
Silver	Lani Pallister	Swimming	Women's 200 metre freestyle	25 July
Silver	Jack Ireland	Swimming	Men's 200 metre freestyle S14	25 July
Silver	Flynn Southam	Swimming	Men's 50 metre freestyle	26 July
Silver	Matthew Temple	Swimming	Men's 100 metre butterfly	26 July
Silver	Gemma Sellick	Swimming	Women's 100 metre backstroke S9	26 July
Silver	Breanna Scott	Artistic gymnastics	Women's individual all-around	26 July
Silver	Mollie O'Callaghan	Swimming	Women's 100 metre freestyle	27 July
Silver	Benjamin Goedemans	Swimming	Men's 800 metre freestyle	27 July
Silver	Harrison Turner	Swimming	Men's 200 metre butterfly	27 July
Silver	Ullrich Muller	Athletics	Men's 100 metres T38	27 July
Silver	William Petric	Swimming	Men's 400 metre individual medley	28 July
Silver	Iona Anderson	Swimming	Women's 50 metre backstroke	28 July
Silver	Sienna Toohey	Swimming	Women's 50 metre breaststroke	28 July
Silver	Nicola Olyslagers	Athletics	Women's high jump	28 July
Silver	Lachlan Kennedy	Athletics	Men's 100 metres	28 July
Silver	Jonah Antonio; Jarred Bairstow; Sam McDaniel; Jesse Wagstaff	3x3 basketball	Men's tournament	29 July
Silver	Alexandria Perkins	Swimming	Women's 50 metre freestyle	29 July
Silver	Emily Beecroft	Swimming	Women's 100 metre freestyle S9	29 July
Silver	Jessica Hull	Athletics	Women's 5000 metres	30 July
Silver	Blake Agnoletto; Oliver Bleddyn; Conor Leahy; James Moriarty	Track cycling	Men's team pursuit	30 July
Silver	Jessica Gallagher; Jacqui Mengler-Mohr (pilot)	Track cycling	Women's tandem sprint B	30 July
Silver	Josh Katz	Judo	Men's 60 kg	31 July
Silver	Nina Kennedy	Athletics	Women's pole vault	31 July
Silver	Layla Sharp	Athletics	Women's long jump T38	31 July
Silver	Conor Leahy	Track cycling	Men's individual pursuit	31 July
Silver	Gordon Allan	Track cycling	Men's 1 km time trial C1-3	31 July
Silver	Leigh Hoffman	Track cycling	Men's keirin	31 July
Silver	Elizabeth McMillen	Athletics	Women's 10,000 metres walk	1 August
Silver	Jacob Cassar	Boxing	Men's 65 kg	1 August
Silver	Saya Middleton	Judo	Women's 63 kg	1 August
Silver	Aoife Coughlan	Judo	Women's 70 kg	1 August
Silver	Ky Robinson	Athletics	Men's 5000 metres	1 August
Silver	Luke Boyes	Athletics	Men's 800 metres	1 August
Silver	Cameron Myers	Athletics	Men's mile	1 August
Silver	Jessica Hull	Athletics	Women's mile	1 August
Silver	Jessica Gallagher; Jacqui Mengler-Mohr (pilot)	Track cycling	Women's tandem 1 km time trial B	1 August
Silver	Claudia Marcks	Track cycling	Women's 1 km time trial	1 August
Silver	Thomas Cornish	Track cycling	Men's scratch race	1 August
Silver	Georgia Baker	Track cycling	Women's elimination race	2 August
Silver	Oliver Bleddyn	Track cycling	Men's points race	2 August
Silver	Maria Swan	Judo	Women's 78 kg	2 August
Silver	Kayhan Ozcicek-Takagi	Judo	Men's +100 kg	2 August
Bronze	Jenna Forrester	Swimming	Women's 400 metre freestyle	24 July
Bronze	Kirralee Hayes	Swimming	Women's 100 metre freestyle S13	24 July
Bronze	Hani Watson	Para Powerlifting	Women's heavyweight	24 July
Bronze	Hannah Fredericks	Swimming	Women's 200 metre backstroke	24 July
Bronze	Benjamin Foster; Tru Hagens; James Hardy; Ritam Malik; Jesse Moore	Artistic gymnastics	Men's team all-around	24 July
Bronze	Benjamin Goedemans	Swimming	Men's 400 metre freestyle	25 July
Bronze	Harrison Vig	Swimming	Men's 100 metre backstroke S9	26 July
Bronze	Jamie Jack	Swimming	Men's 50 metre freestyle	26 July
Bronze	Molly Walker	Swimming	Women's 1500 metre freestyle	26 July
Bronze	Ben Armbruster	Swimming	Men's 100 metre butterfly	26 July
Bronze	Sienna Toohey	Swimming	Women's 100 metre breastroke	26 July
Bronze	Victoria Belando Nicholson	Swimming	Women's 100 metre backstroke S9	26 July
Bronze	Jesse Moore	Artistic gymnastics	Men's individual all-around	26 July
Bronze	James Hardy	Artistic gymnastics	Men's floor	27 July
Bronze	James Hardy	Artistic gymnastics	Men's rings	27 July
Bronze	Ella Ramsay	Swimming	Women's 400 metre individual medley	27 July
Bronze	Shayna Jack	Swimming	Women's 100 metre freestyle	27 July
Bronze	Timothy Hodge	Swimming	Men's 100 metre breaststroke SB9	27 July
Bronze	Matthew Galea	Swimming	Men's 800 metre freestyle	27 July
Bronze	Matthew Temple	Swimming	Men's 200 metre butterfly	27 July
Bronze	Jenna Jones	Swimming	Women's 100 metre freestyle S13	28 July
Bronze	Kyle Chalmers	Swimming	Men's 100 metre freestyle	28 July
Bronze	Zac Stubblety-Cook	Swimming	Men's 200 metre breaststroke	28 July
Bronze	Molly Walker	Swimming	Women's 800 metre freestyle	28 July
Bronze	Torrie Lewis	Athletics	Women's 100 metres	28 July
Bronze	Lara Roberts	Athletics	Women's hammer throw	28 July
Bronze	Nya Hayman	Weightlifting	Women's 69 kg	28 July
Bronze	Hannah Dodd; Georgia Munro-Cook; Taishar Ovens; Ebony Stevenson	3x3 basketball	Women's wheelchair tournament	29 July
Bronze	Tori West	Athletics	Women's heptathlon	29 July
Bronze	Oliver Saxton	Weightlifting	Men's 94 kg	29 July
Bronze	Shayna Jack	Swimming	Women's 50 metre freestyle	29 July
Bronze	Cameron McEvoy	Swimming	Men's 50 metre butterfly	29 July
Bronze	Elizabeth Dekkers	Swimming	Women's 200 metre butterfly	29 July
Bronze	Benjamin Goedemans	Swimming	Men's 1500 metre freestyle	29 July
Bronze	Kane Perris; Luke Zaccaria (pilot)	Track cycling	Men's tandem 1 km time trial B	30 July
Bronze	Eliza Ault-Connell	Athletics	Women's 1500 metres T54	31 July
Bronze	Eve Bryson	Boxing	Women's 65 kg	31 July
Bronze	Paul Trainor	Boxing	Men's 80 kg	31 July
Bronze	Lekeisha Pergoliti	Boxing	Women's 70 kg	31 July
Bronze	Pedro Antun Neto	Judo	Men's 60 kg	31 July
Bronze	Ayla Kowalczyk	Athletics	Women's long jump T38	31 July
Bronze	Sarah Billings	Athletics	Women's 800 metres	31 July
Bronze	James Moriarty	Track cycling	Men's individual pursuit	31 July
Bronze	Sam Rizzo	Athletics	Men's 1500 metres T54	1 August
Bronze	Rebecca Henderson	Athletics	Women's 10,000 metres walk	1 August
Bronze	Keishin Ochi	Judo	Men's 81 kg	1 August
Bronze	Brooke Buschkuehl	Athletics	Women's long jump	1 August
Bronze	Claudia Hollingsworth	Athletics	Women's mile	1 August
Bronze	Briseis Brittain	Athletics	Women's 200 metres T38	1 August
Bronze	Georgia Baker	Track cycling	Women's points race	1 August
Bronze	Kane Perris; Luke Zaccaria (pilot)	Track cycling	Men's tandem sprint B	1 August
Bronze	Tayte Ryan	Track cycling	Men's sprint	1 August
Bronze	Tayte Ryan	Track cycling	Men's 1 km time trial	2 August
Bronze	Kristina Clonan	Track cycling	Women's keirin	2 August
Bronze	Erin Normoyle	Track cycling	Women's 1 km time trial C4-5	2 August
Bronze	Kiera Austin; Courtney Bruce; Sophie Dwyer; Sophie Garbin; Matilda Garrett; Georgie Horjus; Sarah Klau; Cara Koenen; Kate Moloney; Jamie-Lee Price; Liz Watson; Jo Weston	Netball	Women's tournament	2 August

Medals by sport
Sport	1st place, gold medalist(s)	2nd place, silver medalist(s)	3rd place, bronze medalist(s)	Total
3x3 basketball	2	1	1	4
Artistic gymnastics	4	1	4	9
Athletics	12	11	11	34
Bowls	2	0	0	2
Boxing	2	1	3	6
Judo	0	5	2	7
Netball	0	0	1	1
Para powerlifting	0	0	1	1
Swimming	37	16	23	76
Track cycling	10	10	8	28
Weightlifting	1	0	2	3
Total	70	45	56	171

Medals by day
Day	Date	1st place, gold medalist(s)	2nd place, silver medalist(s)	3rd place, bronze medalist(s)	Total
1	24 July	6	2	5	13
2	25 July	6	3	1	10
3	26 July	5	4	7	16
4	27 July	9	4	7	20
5	28 July	9	5	7	21
6	29 July	12	3	7	22
7	30 July	4	3	1	8
8	31 July	4	6	8	18
9	1 August	10	11	9	30
10	2 August	5	4	4	13
Total		70	45	56	171

Medals by gender
Gender	1st place, gold medalist(s)	2nd place, silver medalist(s)	3rd place, bronze medalist(s)	Total
Male	30	23	25	78
Female	38	22	31	91
Mixed	2	0	0	2
Total	70	45	56	171

^{a} Athletes who participated in the heats only.

== Competitors ==
The following is the list of number of competitors participating at the Games per sport/discipline.

Sport	Men	Women	Total
3x3 basketball	8	8	16
Artistic gymnastics	5	5	10
Athletics	42	44	86
Bowls	6	6	12
Boxing	4	4	8
Judo	6	5	11
Netball	—N/a	12	12
Swimming	28	30	58
Track cycling	12	13	25
Weightlifting/Powerlifting	8	10	18
Total	119	143	262

== 3x3 basketball ==
Australia's men's and women's standing and wheelchair basketball teams all received entry to their respective competitions by rankings. The Gangurrus (standing men's and women's teams) and the Wombats (wheelchair men's and women's teams) were announced on 18 June 2026.

Summary

Team	Event	Group stage						Play-in	Semi-final	Final / BM / CM	
Team	Event	Opposition Score	Opposition Score	Opposition Score	Opposition Score	Opposition Score	Rank	Opposition Score	Opposition Score	Opposition Score	Rank
Australia; Jonah Antonio; Jarred Bairstow; Samuel McDaniel; Jesse Wagstaff	Men's	New Zealand; W 21–15	Nigeria; W 21–15	Scotland; W 21–14	Guyana; W 21–11	Cayman Islands; W 21–5	1 Q	—N/a	Scotland; W 21–14	England; L 17–19	2nd place, silver medalist(s)
Australia; Amy Atwell; Emma Clarke; Lara McSpadden; Marena Whittle	Women's	Kenya; W 21–5	Jamaica; W 21–13	Fiji; W 21–3	Cayman Islands; W 21–3	Uganda; W 21–9	1 Q	—N/a	Jamaica; W 21–8	Uganda; W 21–11	1st place, gold medalist(s)
Australia; Tomas Klein; Eithen Leard; Tom O'Neill-Thorne; Luke Pople	Men's wheelchair	England; L 13–16	Kenya; W 21–5	Canada; W 20–12	—N/a		2 Q	Wales; W 21–6	Scotland; W 19–12	England; W 19–13	1st place, gold medalist(s)
Australia; Hannah Dodd; Georgia Munro-Cook; Taishar Ovens; Ebony Stevenson	Women's wheelchair	England; L 6–16	South Africa; W 20–5	Canada; W 12–10 (OT)	—N/a		2 Q	Nigeria; W 19–2	Scotland; L 12–15	Canada; W 19–17	3rd place, bronze medalist(s)

=== Men's tournament ===
Group A

Pos	Team	Pld	W	L	PF	PA	PD	Qualification
1	Australia	5	5	0	105	60	+45	Direct to semi-finals
2	New Zealand	5	4	1	99	56	+43	Quarter-finals
3	Scotland (H)	5	3	2	90	85	+5	Quarter-finals
4	Nigeria	5	2	3	82	99	−17	
5	Guyana	5	1	4	68	100	−32	
6	Cayman Islands	5	0	5	61	105	−44	

Source: Glasgow 2026
Rules for classification: 1) Wins; 2) Head-to-head record; 3) Points scored.
(H) Hosts

24 July 2026
10:00

Report

New Zealand	15–21	Australia
Pts: Book 6		Pts: Antonio, McDaniel 8

SEC, Glasgow

24 July 2026
17:25

Report

Australia	21–15	Nigeria
Pts: Antonio 12		Pts: Nwamu 9

SEC, Glasgow

24 July 2026
20:40

Report

Scotland	14–21	Australia
Pts: White 7		Pts: McDaniel 10

SEC, Glasgow

26 July 2026
14:50

Report

Australia	21–11	Guyana
Pts: Antonio 8		Pts: Hinckson 5

SEC, Glasgow

26 July 2026
20:20

Report

Australia	21–5	Cayman Islands
Pts: McDaniel 12		Pts: Hurlston-Anderson, Ebanks-Perez 2

SEC, Glasgow

Semi-final

29 July 2026
11:30

Report

Australia	21–14	Scotland
Pts: McDaniel 10		Pts: Jimenez 8

SEC, Glasgow

Gold medal game

29 July 2026
19:30

Report

England	19–17	Australia
Pts: Lautier-Ogunleye 7		Pts: Antonio 12

SEC, Glasgow

=== Women's tournament ===
Group A

Pos	Team	Pld	W	L	PF	PA	PD	Qualification
1	Australia	5	5	0	105	33	+72	Direct to semi-finals
2	Uganda	5	4	1	90	58	+32	Quarter-finals
3	Jamaica	5	3	2	89	75	+14	Quarter-finals
4	Kenya	5	2	3	63	85	−22	
5	Fiji	5	1	4	56	81	−25	
6	Cayman Islands	5	0	5	29	100	−71	

Source: Glasgow 2026
Rules for classification: 1) Wins; 2) Head-to-head record; 3) Points scored.

24 July 2026
10:25

Report

Australia	21–5	Kenya
Pts: Clarke 9		Pts: Minayo 2

SEC, Glasgow

24 July 2026
14:30

Report

Australia	21–13	Jamaica
Pts: Atwell 8		Pts: Reynolds 8

SEC, Glasgow

24 July 2026
21:05

Report

Australia	21–3	Fiji
Pts: Clarke 10		Pts: Koroi 2

SEC, Glasgow

26 July 2026
11:55

Report

Australia	21–3	Cayman Islands
Pts: Atwell 11		Pts: O'Connor 2

SEC, Glasgow

26 July 2026
20:45

Report

Australia	21–9	Uganda
Pts: Atwell 11		Pts: Akullu 4

SEC, Glasgow

Semi-final

29 July 2026
13:30

Report

Australia	21–8	Jamaica
Pts: Atwell 13		Pts: Reynolds, Brown 3

SEC, Glasgow

Gold medal game

29 July 2026
20:00

Report

Uganda	11–21	Australia
Pts: Akullu 7		Pts: Whittle 15

SEC, Glasgow

=== Men's wheelchair tournament ===
Group A

Pos	Team	Pld	W	L	PF	PA	PD	Qualification
1	England	3	3	0	57	23	+34	Semi-finals
2	Australia	3	2	1	54	33	+21	Play-ins
3	Canada	3	1	2	38	43	−5	Play-ins
4	Kenya	3	0	3	8	58	−50	

Source: Glasgow 2026
Rules for classification: 1) Wins; 2) Head-to-head record; 3) Points scored.

24 July 2026
16:35

Report

England	16–13	Australia
Pts: Cusack 7		Pts: O'Neill-Thorne, Pople 4

SEC Centre, Glasgow

26 July 2026
12:20

Report

Australia	21–5	Kenya
Pts: Klein 8		Pts: Ilahuya 4

SEC Centre, Glasgow

27 July 2026
12:45

Report

Australia	20–12	Canada
Pts: O'Neill-Thorne 10		Pts: De'Aeth 9

SEC Centre, Glasgow

Play-in

28 July 2026
18:30

Report

Australia	21–6	Wales
Pts: Leard 8		Pts: May 4

SEC Centre, Glasgow

Semi-final

29 July 2026
12:30

Report

Scotland	12–19	Australia
Pts: Erskine 9		Pts: O'Neill-Thorne 8

SEC Centre, Glasgow

Gold medal game

29 July 2026
18:30

Report

Australia	19–13	England
Pts: Leard 10		Pts: Knight 6

SEC Centre, Glasgow

=== Women's wheelchair tournament ===
Group A

Pos	Team	Pld	W	L	PF	PA	PD	Qualification
1	England	3	3	0	51	20	+31	Semi-finals
2	Australia	3	2	1	38	30	+8	Quarter-finals
3	Canada	3	1	2	41	30	+11	Quarter-finals
4	South Africa	3	0	3	10	60	−50	

Source: Glasgow 2026
Rules for classification: 1) Wins; 2) Head-to-head record; 3) Points scored.

24 July 2026
12:05

Report

England	15–6	Australia
Pts: Haizelden 7		Pts: Munro-Cook 4

SEC Centre, Glasgow

26 July 2026
14:25

Report

Australia	20–5	South Africa
Pts: Munro-Cook 10		Pts: Gilifile 3

SEC Centre, Glasgow

27 July 2026
14:00

Report

Australia	12–10 (OT)	Canada
Pts: Munro-Cook 8		Pts: Dandeneau 8

SEC Centre, Glasgow

Play-in

28 July 2026
21:00

Report

Australia	19–2	Nigeria
Pts: Munro-Cook 8		Pts: Adefala, Olaleye 1

SEC Centre, Glasgow

Semi-final

29 July 2026
15:00

Report

Scotland	15–12	Australia
Pts: Love 6		Pts: Munro-Cook 6

SEC Centre, Glasgow

Bronze medal game

29 July 2026
18:00

Report

Australia	19–17	Canada
Pts: Munro-Cook 12		Pts: Dandeneau 16

SEC Centre, Glasgow

== Artistic gymnastics ==
Ten athletes selected on 11 June 2026.

Men

Team Final and Individual Qualification

Athlete	Event	Apparatus						Total	Rank
Athlete	Event	F	PH	R	V	PB	HB	Total	Rank
Benjamin Foster	Team	12.550 (16)	11.750 (21)	11.800 (21)	12.500	12.750 (18)	11.100 (29)	72.450	14
Tru Hagens	Team	—N/a	13.100 (7)	—N/a	—N/a	—N/a	—N/a	—N/a	
James Hardy	Team	13.150 (7) Q	—N/a	13.200 (5) Q	13.750 (3) Q	12.850 (15)	12.350 (17)	—N/a	
Ritam Malik	Team	12.750 (15)	13.500 (5) Q	12.400 (13)	13.500	11.950 (24)	13.450 (5) Q	77.550	8 Q
Jesse Moore	Team	11.800 (29)	13.300 (6) Q	13.000 (7) Q	13.900	13.500 (8) Q	12.650 (14)	78.150	7 Q
Total		38.450 (3)	39.300 (3)	38.600 (3)	41.150 (4)	39.100 (4)	38.450 (3)	235.650	3rd place, bronze medalist(s)

Individual Finals

Athlete	Event	Apparatus						Total	Rank
Athlete	Event	F	PH	R	V	PB	HB	Total	Rank
Ritam Malik	All-around	12.900	13.300	12.400	13.350	12.450	13.000	77.400	6
Jesse Moore	All-around	12.600	12.500	12.550	13.850	13.400	14.100	79.00	3rd place, bronze medalist(s)
James Hardy	Floor	—N/a						13.433	3rd place, bronze medalist(s)
Ritam Malik	Pommel horse	—N/a						13.333	4
Jesse Moore	Pommel horse	—N/a						12.833	7
James Hardy	Rings	—N/a						13.500	3rd place, bronze medalist(s)
Jesse Moore	Rings	—N/a						11.533	8
James Hardy	Vault	—N/a						13.566	5
Jesse Moore	Parallel bars	—N/a						14.000	1st place, gold medalist(s)
Ritam Malik	Horizontal bar	—N/a						12.833	6

Women

Team Final and Individual Qualification

Athlete	Event	Apparatus				Total	Rank
Athlete	Event	V	UB	BB	F	Total	Rank
Georgia Godwin	Team	13.550 (3) Q	12.800 (10)	12.900 (4)	12.850 (6) Q	52.100	4 Q
Kate McDonald	Team	—N/a	14.200 (1) Q	12.900 (3) Q	12.800 (7) Q	—N/a	
Ruby Pass	Team	13.000 (12)	13.400 (6) Q	11.700 (17)	—N/a	—N/a	
Breanna Scott	Team	12.850	13.150 (9)	13.600 (1) Q	12.750 (8)	52.350	3 Q
Emily Whitehead	Team	13.300 (9)	—N/a	—N/a	12.500 (10)	—N/a	
Total		39.850 (4)	40.750 (1)	39.400 (1)	38.400 (3)	158.400	1st place, gold medalist(s)

Individual Finals

Athlete	Event	Apparatus				Total	Rank
Athlete	Event	VT	UB	BB	FL	Total	Rank
Georgia Godwin	All-around	12.900	12.850	12.500	12.700	50.950	5
Breanna Scott	All-around	13.100	13.100	13.900	12.800	52.900	2nd place, silver medalist(s)
Georgia Godwin	Vault	—N/a				13.116	6
Kate McDonald	Uneven bars	—N/a				14.333	1st place, gold medalist(s)
Ruby Pass	Uneven bars	—N/a				11.666	8
Kate McDonald	Balance beam	—N/a				12.166	8
Breanna Scott	Balance beam	—N/a				13.933	1st place, gold medalist(s)
Georgia Godwin	Floor	—N/a				12.300	7
Kate McDonald	Floor	—N/a				12.933	6

== Athletics ==
Eleven athletes were selected on 13 April 2026. Twenty four Para athlertes selected on 7 May 2026. Final team of 86 athletes announced on 22 June 2026. Angie Ballrd who was originally selected withdrew due to injury.

Key

Ranks given for track events are within the athlete's heat only.

- Q = Qualified for the next round
- q = Qualified for the next round as a fastest loser or, in field events, by position without achieving the qualifying target

Men

Track & road events

Athlete	Event	Heat		Semifinal		Final	
Athlete	Event	Result	Rank	Result	Rank	Result	Rank
Rohan Browning	100 m	10.24	2 Q	10.14	4	did not advance	
Lachlan Kennedy	100 m	Bye		9.94	2 Q	9.85	2nd place, silver medalist(s)
Eddie Osei-Nketia	100 m	10.07	2 Q	10.03	3 Q	10.06	6
Nathan Jason	100 m T12	11.23	3	—N/a		did not advance	
Ullrich Muller	100 m T38	—N/a				11.19	2nd place, silver medalist(s)
Thomas McGough	100 m T38	—N/a				11.74	4
Jaydon Page	100 m T47	—N/a				10.97	4
Lachlan Kennedy	200 m	20.50	2 q	20.12	3 q	20.41	6
Calab Law	200 m	Bye		20.60	5	did not advance	
Aidan Murphy	200 m	Bye		20.70	7	did not advance	
Reece Holder	400 m	45.63	2 Q	45.99	4	did not advance	
Tom Reynolds	400 m	Bye		45.63	1 Q	45.57	5
Peter Bol	800 m	1:45.86	1 Q	1:45.25	2 Q	1:46.73	7
Luke Boyes	800 m	1:47.37	2 Q	1:45.11	2 Q	1:45.93	2nd place, silver medalist(s)
Peyton Craig	800 m	1:47.17	3 Q	1:45.25	3 Q	1:46.66	6
Oliver Hoare	1 mile	4:06.84	9 q	—N/a		3:56.28	5
Cameron Myers	1 mile	3:53.85	1 Q	—N/a		3:55.26	2nd place, silver medalist(s)
Adam Spencer	1 mile	3:59.72	6 Q	—N/a		3:56.62	8
Archer Hewett	1500 m T20	—N/a				4:07.71	4
Daniel Milone	1500 m T20	—N/a				4:17.18	8
Sam Carter	1500 m T54	—N/a				3:21.49	6
Sam Rizzo	1500 m T54	—N/a				3:18.61	3rd place, bronze medalist(s)
Seth O'Donnell	5000 m	—N/a				13:40.42	16
Ky Robinson	5000 m	—N/a				13:24.70	2nd place, silver medalist(s)
Jackson Sharp	5000 m	—N/a				13:29.38	9
Ky Robinson	10,000 m	—N/a				27:48.93	1st place, gold medalist(s)
Matthew Hunt	400 m hurdles	50.33	4	—N/a		did not advance	
Isaac Beacroft	10,000 m walk	—N/a				38:45.51	1st place, gold medalist(s)
Timothy Fraser	10,000 m walk	—N/a				DQ	
Declan Tingay	10,000 m walk	—N/a				41:06.05	4
Joshua Azzopardi; Rohan Browning; Christopher Ius^{[d]} Lachlan Kennedy; Calab Law	4 x 100 m	38.69	3 Q	—N/a		38.07	1st place, gold medalist(s)

Field events

Athlete	Event	Qualification		Final	
Athlete	Event	Distance	Rank	Distance	Rank
Yual Reath	High jump	—N/a		2.10	7
Liam Adcock	Long jump	7.74	9 q	7.74	8
Chris Mitrevski	Long jump	7.89	4 q	8.02	4
Lindsey Hendy	Long jump T20	—N/a		5.48	7
Matthew Denny	Discus throw	—N/a		67.73	1st place, gold medalist(s)
Michal Burian	Discus throw F42-44/F61-64	—N/a		44.24	8
Cameron McEntyre	Javelin throw	78.91	6 q	72.34	11
Matthew Sheppard	Shot put F57	—N/a		10.29	7
Kurtis Marschall	Pole vault	—N/a		5.85 GR	1st place, gold medalist(s)

Women

Track & road events

Athlete	Event	Heat		Semifinal		Final	
Athlete	Event	Result	Rank	Result	Rank	Result	Rank
Georgia Harris	100 m	11.51	3 Q	11.80	8	did not advance	
Ebony Lane	100 m	11.50	2 Q	11.52	6	did not advance	
Torrie Lewis	100 m	11.15	1 Q	11.00	1 Q	10.99	3rd place, bronze medalist(s)
Briseis Brittain	100 m T38	13.50	3 Q	—N/a		13.50	6
Rhiannon Clarke	100 m T38	12.96	1 Q	—N/a		12.94	4
Ella Pardy	100 m T38	13.44	2 Q	—N/a		13.48	5
Lexie Brown	100 m T47	—N/a				13.15	7
Mia Gross	200 m	23.21	1 q	23.12	4	did not advance	
Monique Hanlon	200 m	23.12	1 q	22.90	4	did not advance	
Torrie Lewis	200 m	Bye		22.64	1 Q	22.88	6
Briseis Brittain	200 m T38	—N/a				27.66	3rd place, bronze medalist(s)
Rhiannon Clarke	200 m T38	—N/a				26.92	1st place, gold medalist(s)
Ella Pardy	200 m T38	—N/a				28.00	4
Eliza Ault-Connell	400 m T54	59.63	3 Q	—N/a		1:00.15	5
Mikaela Dingley	400 m T54	1:16.95	5	—N/a		did not advance	
Aimee Fisher	400 m T54	1:12.27	4 q	—N/a		1:13.55	8
Sarah Billings	800 m	2:01.51	1 Q	2:00.05	2 Q	2:00.61	3rd place, bronze medalist(s)
Abbey Caldwell	1 mile	4:34.87	3 Q	—N/a		4:39.31	1st place, gold medalist(s)
Claudia Hollingsworth	1 mile	4:31.17	1 Q	—N/a		4:40.20	3rd place, bronze medalist(s)
Jessica Hull	1 mile	4:34.20	2 Q	—N/a		4:39.86	2nd place, silver medalist(s)
Eliza Ault-Connell	1500 m T54	—N/a				3:40.84	3rd place, bronze medalist(s)
Mikaela Dingley	1500 m T54	—N/a				4:41.13	6
Rose Davies	5000 m	—N/a				14:44.53	1st place, gold medalist(s)
Linden Hall	5000 m	—N/a				14:55.28	7
Jessica Hull	5000 m	—N/a				14:45.01	2nd place, silver medalist(s)
Rose Davies	10,000 m	—N/a				31:39.32	1st place, gold medalist(s)
Lauren Ryan	10,000 m	—N/a				31:59.41	5
Michelle Jenneke	100 m hurdles	12.72	3 Q	—N/a		12.84	5
Sarah Carli	400 m hurdles	55.76	4 q	—N/a		55.85	6
Cara Feain-Ryan	3000 m steeplechase	—N/a				9:22.07	4
Rebecca Henderson	10,000 m walk	—N/a				43:27.46	3rd place, bronze medalist(s)
Elizabeth McMillen	10,000 m walk	—N/a				42:39.87	2nd place, silver medalist(s)
Jemima Montag	10,000 m walk	—N/a				42:13.40	1st place, gold medalist(s)
Monique Hanlon; Georgia Harris^{[d]} Ebony Lane; Torrie Lewis; Chloe Mannix-Power	4 x 100 m	43.52	3 Q	—N/a		43.09	4

Field events

Athlete	Event	Qualification		Final	
Athlete	Event	Distance	Rank	Distance	Rank
Nicola Olyslagers	High jump	—N/a		1.93	2nd place, silver medalist(s)
Eleanor Patterson	High jump	—N/a		1.96	1st place, gold medalist(s)
Brooke Buschkuehl	Long jump	6.83	1 Q	6.80	3rd place, bronze medalist(s)
Delta Amidzovski	Long jump	6.55	8 q	6.75	4
Ayla Kowalczyk	Long jump T38	—N/a		4.71	3rd place, bronze medalist(s)
Sienna Newton	Long jump T38	—N/a		4.70	5
Layla Sharp	Long jump T38	—N/a		5.06	2nd place, silver medalist(s)
Nina Kennedy	Pole vault	—N/a		4.65	2nd place, silver medalist(s)
Desleigh Owusu	Triple jump	—N/a		13.81	4
Stephanie Ratcliffe	Hammer throw	65.73	5 q	64.01	7
Lara Roberts	Hammer throw	66.73	3 q	68.05	3rd place, bronze medalist(s)
Lianna Davidson	Javelin throw	—N/a		57.61	4
Mackenzie Little	Javelin throw	—N/a		61.88	1st place, gold medalist(s)
Marley Raikiwasa	Shot put	—N/a		16.13	6
Julie Charlton	Shot put F57	—N/a		6.19	7
Ainsley Hooker	Shot put F57	—N/a		5.40	8

Combined events – Women's heptathlon

Athlete	Event	100H	HJ	SP	200 m	LJ	JT	800 m	Final	Rank
Mia Scerri	Result	14.05	1.73	13.87	24.72	6.29	36.30	2:14.52	5996	7
Mia Scerri	Points	971	891	785	913	940	596	900	5996	7
Tori West	Result	13.55	1.70	12.51	24.60	6.13	47.24	2:15.23	6104	3rd place, bronze medalist(s)
Tori West	Points	1043	855	695	924	890	807	890	6104	3rd place, bronze medalist(s)

Mixed

Athlete	Event	Heat		Semifinal		Final	
Athlete	Event	Result	Rank	Result	Rank	Result	Rank
Mia Gross; Jemma Pollard; Cooper Sherman; Luke van Ratingen	4 x 400 m	3:15.21	2 Q	—N/a		DQ	

^{d} Runners who participated in the heats only.

== Bowls ==
Australia announced their lawn bowls team for the 2026 Commonwealth Games on 19 May 2026.

Men

Athlete	Event	Group Stage							Semi-final	Final / BM	
Athlete	Event	Opposition Score	Opposition Score	Opposition Score	Opposition Score	Opposition Score	Opposition Score	Rank	Opposition Score	Opposition Score	Rank
Aaron Wilson	Singles	Guernsey; W 1.5–0.5	Namibia; W 2–0	Botswana; W 2–0	Isle of Man; W 2–0	Cook Islands; W 2–0	Jersey; W 2–0	1 Q	Malaysia; L 1–1*	Northern Ireland; L 0.5–1.5	4
Aaron Teys; Corey Wedlock	Pairs	Pakistan; W 2–0	Fiji; W 2–0	Tonga; W 1*–1	Northern Ireland; L 0.5–1.5	New Zealand; L 1–1*	—N/a	3	did not advance		
Damien Delgado; James Reynolds	Pairs B6–8	New Zealand; W 1*–1	England; W 1*–1	Singapore; W 1*–1	South Africa; W 1*–1	Scotland; W 1.5–0.5	—N/a	1 Q	Scotland; W 2–0	New Zealand; W 2–0	1st place, gold medalist(s)

Women

Athlete	Event	Group Stage							Semi-final	Final / BM	
Athlete	Event	Opposition Score	Opposition Score	Opposition Score	Opposition Score	Opposition Score	Opposition Score	Rank	Opposition Score	Opposition Score	Rank
Ellen Fife	Singles	Canada; W 1*–1	England; L 0.5–1.5	Jersey; W 2–0	Malta; W 1.5–0.5	Falkland Islands; W 2–0	Cook Islands; W 1*–1	2	did not advance		
Kelsey Cottrell; Dawn Hayman	Pairs	Zambia; W 2–0	Guernsey; L 0–2	Isle of Man; W 2–0	Singapore; W 2–0	Niue; W 2–0	Northern Ireland; W 2–0	2	did not advance		
Louise Hoskins; Serena Bonnell	Pairs B6–8	New Zealand; L 0–2	England; W 2–0	Canada; W 2–0	Malaysia; W 1.5–0.5	Scotland; L 0–2	—N/a	3 Q	Scotland; W 2–0	New Zealand; W 1.5–0.5	1st place, gold medalist(s)

Mixed

Athlete	Event	Group Stage						Semi-final	Final / BM	
Athlete	Event	Opposition Score	Opposition Score	Opposition Score	Opposition Score	Opposition Score	Rank	Opposition Score	Opposition Score	Rank
Jake Fehlberg; Jacqueline Hudson; Claire Turlet; Karen Murphy	Pairs B2–3	Wales; L 1–1*	South Africa; W 1.5–0.5	Scotland; L 0.5–1.5	New Zealand; L 0–2	England; W 1*–1	5	did not advance		

== Boxing ==
Eight boxers selected on 29 April 2026. All boxers making their Commonwealth Games debut.

Men

Athlete	Event	Round of 32	Round of 16	Quarterfinals	Semifinals	Final	
Athlete	Event	Opposition Result	Opposition Result	Opposition Result	Opposition Result	Opposition Result	Rank
Jye Dixon	55 kg	Bye	Seholoholo (LES); W 5–0	Hossain (BAN); W RSC	Mohammed (GHA); W 4–1	Mandengbam (IND); W 5–0	1st place, gold medalist(s)
Jacob Cassar	65 kg	Bye	Campbell (NZL); W 5–0	Labrie (CAN); W 3–2	Khoahli (LES); W 5–0	Mughalzai (ENG); L 0–5	2nd place, silver medalist(s)
Paul Trainor	80 kg	Perrie (SCO); W RSC2	Ipinge (NAM); W 3–2	Pitt (WAL); W 4–1	Shittu (ENG); L 0–5	did not advance	3rd place, bronze medalist(s)
Lachlan Lawson	90 kg	—N/a	Bye	Okoh (ENG); L 0–5	did not advance		

Women

Athlete	Event	Round of 32	Round of 16	Quarterfinals	Semifinals	Final	
Athlete	Event	Opposition Result	Opposition Result	Opposition Result	Opposition Result	Opposition Result	Rank
Monique Suraci	54 kg	Bye	Mackie (ENG); L 2–3	did not advance			
Eve Bryson	65 kg	—N/a		Nakalema (UGA); W 4–1	Hickey (ENG); L 0–5	did not advance	3rd place, bronze medalist(s)
Lekeisha Pergoliti	70 kg	—N/a		Orakwe (NGR); W 3–2	Reid (ENG); L 0–5	did not advance	3rd place, bronze medalist(s)
Emma-Sue Greentree	75 kg	—N/a		Bye	Smith (ENG); W 3–2	Borgohain (IND); W 4–1	1st place, gold medalist(s)

== Judo ==
Eleven athletes selected on 3 June 2026.

Men

Athlete	Event	Round of 32	Round of 16	Quarterfinals	Semifinals	Repechage	Final / BM	
Athlete	Event	Opposition Result	Opposition Result	Opposition Result	Opposition Result	Opposition Result	Opposition Result	Rank
Josh Katz	60 kg	—N/a	Bouvet (RWA); W 101–0	Phuthego (BOT); W 100–0	Ayre (ENG); W 1s1–0s1	—N/a	Singh (IND); L 0–10	2nd place, silver medalist(s)
Pedro Antun Neto	60 kg	—N/a	Bye	Wali (KEN); W 1s2–0s1	Singh (IND); L 0s2–10s1	—N/a	Phuthego (BOT); W 100s1–0s1	3rd place, bronze medalist(s)
Vas Middleton	66 kg	Bye	Canon (NRU); W 3–0s2	Agbo (NGR); L 0–2s1	—N/a	Moffat (SCO); W 100s1–0s2	Christodoulidis (CYP); L 0s1–1s2	4
Keishin Ochi	81 kg	—N/a	Bye	Mlugu (TAN); W 100s1–0s1	Amir Daniel (MAS); L 0s1–1	—N/a	Tokas (IND); W 100s1–0s2	3rd place, bronze medalist(s)
Danny Vojnikovich	90 kg	—N/a	Bye	Petgrave (ENG); W 2s2–1s1	Rémi Feuillet (MRI); L 0–100	—N/a	Cusack (SCO); L 0s3–100s2	4
Kayhan Ozcicek-Takagi	+100 kg	—N/a	Bye	Miller (SCO); W 10s2–0s2	Bessong (CAN); W 100s2–0s3	—N/a	Antoniou (CYP); L 0s2–10s1	2nd place, silver medalist(s)

Women

Athlete	Event	Round of 16	Quarterfinals	Semifinals	Repechage	Final / BM	
Athlete	Event	Opposition Result	Opposition Result	Opposition Result	Opposition Result	Opposition Result	Rank
Tinka Easton	52 kg	Bye	Chopade (IND); W 1–0s2	Beaton (CAN); L 0s1–1	—N/a	Baba Matia (CMR); L 0–100s1	4
Maeve Coughlan	63 kg	Bye	Kabinda (ZAM); L 0–11s1	—N/a	Knoester (RSA); L 0s3–100s1	did not advance	
Saya Middleton	63 kg	Doig (SCO); W 10s1–1	Ekuta (NGR); W 100s2–0s2	Sharma (IND); W 100s1–1	—N/a	Biron (CAN); L 0s3–100s1	2nd place, silver medalist(s)
Aoife Coughlan	70 kg	Bye	Devall (WAL); W 101–0s1	de Villiers (NZL); W 100–0s3	—N/a	Petersen-Pollard (ENG); L 0s3–100	2nd place, silver medalist(s)
Maria Swan	78 kg	Bye	Cherotich (KEN); W 110s1–0s1	Godbout (CAN); W 10s1–0s1	—N/a	Reid (ENG); L 1–100s1	2nd place, silver medalist(s)

== Netball ==
Australia qualified as one of the top 11 eligible teams in the World Netball Rankings as of 1 September 2025. Twelve athletes were selected on 17 June 2026.

Roster

- Kiera Austin
- Courtney Bruce
- Sophie Dwyer
- Sophie Garbin
- Matilda Garrett
- Georgie Horjus
- Sarah Klau
- Cara Koenen
- Kate Moloney
- Jamie-Lee Price
- Liz Watson (c)
- Jo Weston

Summary

Team	Event	Group stage						Semifinal	Final / BM / Cl.	
Team	Event	Opposition Result	Opposition Result	Opposition Result	Opposition Result	Opposition Result	Rank	Opposition Result	Opposition Result	Rank
Australia	Women's tournament	Tonga; W 99–38	England; W 66–47	Malawi; W 68–32	South Africa; W 57–47	Northern Ireland; W 88–27	1 Q	Jamaica; L 45–46	England; W 68–50	3rd place, bronze medalist(s)

Group stage

Pos	Team	Pld	W	D	L	GF	GA	GD	Pts	Qualification
1	Australia	5	5	0	0	378	191	+187	10	Semi-finals
2	England	5	4	0	1	355	224	+131	8	Semi-finals
3	South Africa	5	3	0	2	340	231	+109	6	Classification matches
4	Malawi	5	2	0	3	233	303	−70	4	Classification matches
5	Tonga	5	1	0	4	219	396	−177	2	Classification matches
6	Northern Ireland	5	0	0	5	191	371	−180	0	Classification matches

Source: Glasgow 2026

25 July 2026; 11:00	Report	Australia	99–38	Tonga	OVO Hydro; Umpires: Angela Armstrong-Lush, Tracy-Ann Griffiths; Reserve umpire: Louise Travis
25 July 2026; 11:00	Report	Scoring by quarter: 23–12, 28–7, 23–9, 25–10			OVO Hydro; Umpires: Angela Armstrong-Lush, Tracy-Ann Griffiths; Reserve umpire: Louise Travis
25 July 2026; 11:00	Report	Cara Koenen 31/31 (100%); Sophie Garbin 31/34 (91%); Kiera Austin 20/21 (95%); Sophie Dwyer 17/19 (89%)		Uneeq Palavi 30/35 (86%); Marie Payn 3/3 (100%); Lavinia Lavea 3/6 (50%); Sovika Pousini 2/2 (100%)	OVO Hydro; Umpires: Angela Armstrong-Lush, Tracy-Ann Griffiths; Reserve umpire: Louise Travis

26 July 2026; 11:00	Report	Australia	66–47	England	OVO Hydro; Umpires: Alison Harrison, Kristie Simpson; Reserve umpire: Ken Metekingi
26 July 2026; 11:00	Report	Scoring by quarter: 18–11, 17–13, 21–11, 10–12			OVO Hydro; Umpires: Alison Harrison, Kristie Simpson; Reserve umpire: Ken Metekingi
26 July 2026; 11:00	Report	Sophie Garbin 41/42 (98%); Kiera Austin 15/19 (79%); Sophie Dwyer 6/6 (100%); Cara Koenen 4/5 (80%)		Olivia Tchine 23/25 (92%); Lois Pearson 14/16 (88%); Eleanor Cardwell 10/13 (77%)	OVO Hydro; Umpires: Alison Harrison, Kristie Simpson; Reserve umpire: Ken Metekingi

28 July 2026; 21:00	Report	Australia	68–32	Malawi	OVO Hydro; Umpires: Gareth Fowler, Tania Fink; Reserve umpire: Angela Armstrong-Lush
28 July 2026; 21:00	Report	Scoring by quarter: 19–6, 19–7, 17–10, 13–9			OVO Hydro; Umpires: Gareth Fowler, Tania Fink; Reserve umpire: Angela Armstrong-Lush
28 July 2026; 21:00	Report	Cara Koenen 25/26 (96%); Sophie Garbin 22/25 (88%); Kiera Austin 13/14 (93%); Sophie Dwyer 8/8 (100%)		Mwayi Kumwenda 17/20 (85%); Tendai Masamba 11/13 (85%); Ethel Ng'ambi 4/5 (80%)	OVO Hydro; Umpires: Gareth Fowler, Tania Fink; Reserve umpire: Angela Armstrong-Lush

29 July 2026; 21:00	Report	Australia	57–47	South Africa	OVO Hydro; Umpires: Tania Fink, Louise Travis; Reserve umpire: Gareth Fowler
29 July 2026; 21:00	Report	Scoring by quarter: 14–13, 18–8, 13–14, 12–12			OVO Hydro; Umpires: Tania Fink, Louise Travis; Reserve umpire: Gareth Fowler
29 July 2026; 21:00	Report	Sophie Garbin 33/34 (97%); Kiera Austin 15/23 (65%); Cara Koenen 6/7 (86%); Sophie Dwyer 3/4 (75%)		Elmeré van der Berg 39/44 (89%); Kamogelo Maseko 4/4 (100%); Sammy Ngubane 4/6 (67%)	OVO Hydro; Umpires: Tania Fink, Louise Travis; Reserve umpire: Gareth Fowler

30 July 2026; 16:00	Report	Australia	88–27	Northern Ireland	OVO Hydro; Umpires: Gary Burgess, Angela Armstrong-Lush; Reserve umpire: Alison Harrison
30 July 2026; 16:00	Report	Scoring by quarter: 27–6, 20–4, 19–12, 22–5			OVO Hydro; Umpires: Gary Burgess, Angela Armstrong-Lush; Reserve umpire: Alison Harrison
30 July 2026; 16:00	Report	Cara Koenen 57/58 (98%); Sophie Garbin 15/15 (100%); Sophie Dwyer 11/11 (100%); Georgie Horjus 5/7 (71%)		Lisa Bowman 15/18 (83%); Orlaith Rogers 7/10 (70%); Georgie McGrath 3/5 (60%); Emma Magee 2/3 (67%)	OVO Hydro; Umpires: Gary Burgess, Angela Armstrong-Lush; Reserve umpire: Alison Harrison

Semi-final

1 August 2026; 13:00	Report	Australia	45–46	Jamaica	OVO Hydro; Umpires: Gareth Fowler, Ken Metekingi; Reserve umpire: Kristie Simpson
1 August 2026; 13:00	Report	Scoring by quarter: 10–13, 11–10, 14–12, 10–11			OVO Hydro; Umpires: Gareth Fowler, Ken Metekingi; Reserve umpire: Kristie Simpson
1 August 2026; 13:00	Report	Kiera Austin 22/23 (96%); Cara Koenen 18/20 (90%); Sophie Garbin 4/4 (100%); Sophie Dwyer 1/3 (33%)		Romelda Aiken 29/32 (91%); Shanice Beckford 17/18 (94%)	OVO Hydro; Umpires: Gareth Fowler, Ken Metekingi; Reserve umpire: Kristie Simpson

Bronze medal game

2 August 2026; 09:00	Report	Australia	68–50	England	OVO Hydro; Umpires: Gareth Fowler, Ken Metekingi; Reserve umpire: Kristie Simpson
2 August 2026; 09:00	Report	Scoring by quarter: 19–11, 16–13, 14–12, 19–14			OVO Hydro; Umpires: Gareth Fowler, Ken Metekingi; Reserve umpire: Kristie Simpson
2 August 2026; 09:00	Report	Sophie Garbin 46/50 (92%); Kiera Austin 22/24 (92%)		Olivia Tchine 25/25 (100%); Eleanor Cardwell 15/17 (88%); Lois Pearson 8/9 (89%); Sasha Glasgow 2/4 (50%)	OVO Hydro; Umpires: Gareth Fowler, Ken Metekingi; Reserve umpire: Kristie Simpson

== Para powerlifting ==
Six athletes selected on 24 April 2026.

Athlete	Event	Result	Rank
Natasha Price	Women's lightweight	57.2	11
Jade Pritchard	Women's lightweight	60.6	10
Hani Watson	Women's heavyweight	111.5	3rd place, bronze medalist(s)
Daniel Bos	Men's lightweight	123.3	9
Cameron Whittington	Men's heavyweight	No result	
Ben Wright	Men's heavyweight	110.9	8

== Swimming ==
Eighteen Para swimmers selected on 10 May 2026. Final team of 60 swimmers selected on 13 June 2026. Kaylee McKeown withdrew on 10 July 2026 due to illness. Thomas Neill withdrew on 20 July 2026 due to injury.

Men

Athlete	Event	Heat		Semifinal		Final	
Athlete	Event	Time	Rank	Time	Rank	Time	Rank
Jamie Jack	50 m freestyle	21.95	3 Q	21.55	1 Q	21.47	3rd place, bronze medalist(s)
Cameron McEvoy	50 m freestyle	21.87	2 Q	21.64	3 Q	20.97 GR	1st place, gold medalist(s)
Flynn Southam	50 m freestyle	22.03	5 Q	21.86	4 Q	21.44	2nd place, silver medalist(s)
Kyle Chalmers	100 m freestyle	49.06	5 Q	47.87	1 Q	47.74	3rd place, bronze medalist(s)
Flynn Southam	100 m freestyle	48.58	2 Q	48.08	2 Q	47.13	1st place, gold medalist(s)
Kai Taylor	100 m freestyle	49.33	7 Q	49.10	10	did not advance	
Samuel Short	200 m freestyle	1:45.90	2 Q	—N/a		1:45.94	5
Kai Taylor	200 m freestyle	1:47.23	7 Q	—N/a		1:45.22	1st place, gold medalist(s)
Harrison Turner	200 m freestyle	1:46.08	3 Q	—N/a		1:45.93	4
Jack Ireland	200 m freestyle S14	1:56.33	2 Q	—N/a		1:55.22	2nd place, silver medalist(s)
Benjamin Goedemans	400 m freestyle	3:46.47	2 Q	—N/a		3:45.57	3rd place, bronze medalist(s)
Samuel Short	400 m freestyle	3:46.23	1 Q	—N/a		3:41.25	1st place, gold medalist(s)
Elijah Winnington	400 m freestyle	3:47.84	4 Q	—N/a		3:45.56	2nd place, silver medalist(s)
Benjamin Goedemans	800 m freestyle	—N/a				7:46.49	2nd place, silver medalist(s)
Matthew Galea	800 m freestyle	—N/a				7:47.10	3rd place, bronze medalist(s)
Samuel Short	800 m freestyle	—N/a				7:39.81	1st place, gold medalist(s)
Benjamin Goedemans	1500 m freestyle	—N/a				14:49.50	3rd place, bronze medalist(s)
Matthew Galea	1500 m freestyle	—N/a				15:00.69	4
Samuel Short	1500 m freestyle	—N/a				14:42.11	1st place, gold medalist(s)
Henry Allan	50 m backstroke	25.09	6 Q	24.87	5 Q	24.72	5
Isaac Cooper	50 m backstroke	25.11	7 Q	24.85	4 Q	24.73	6
Henry Allan	100 m backstroke	54.15	5 Q	53.93	7 Q	53.51	5
Isaac Cooper	100 m backstroke	54.36	7 Q	54.58	8	did not advance	
Timothy Hodge	100 m backstroke S9	1:06.40	3 Q	—N/a		1:03.00	1st place, gold medalist(s)
Liam Togher	100 m backstroke S9	1:06.04	1 Q	—N/a		1:05.48	4
Harrison Vig	100 m backstroke S9	1:06.28	2 Q	—N/a		1:04.87	3rd place, bronze medalist(s)
Henry Allan	200 m backstroke	1:59.34	5 Q	—N/a		1:57.05	5
Se-Bom Lee	200 m backstroke	1:58.82	4 Q	—N/a		1:56.78	4
Sam Williamson	50 m breaststroke	26.75	2 Q	26.79	2 Q	26.50	1st place, gold medalist(s)
Bailey Lello	100 m breaststroke	1:00.96	9 Q	1:00.83	9	did not advance	
Zac Stubblety-Cook	100 m breaststroke	1:00.21	5 Q	1:00.36	7 Q	1:00.20	5
Sam Williamson	100 m breaststroke	59.56	2 Q	59.27	2 Q	59.17	1st place, gold medalist(s)
Timothy Hodge	100 m breaststroke SB9	1:13.60	4 Q	—N/a		1:12.74	3rd place, bronze medalist(s)
Beau Matthews	100 m breaststroke SB9	1:12.74	3 Q	—N/a		1:09.41	1st place, gold medalist(s)
Bailey Lello	200 m breaststroke	2:11.65	5 Q	—N/a		2:10.90	5
Zac Stubblety-Cook	200 m breaststroke	2:11.07	4 Q	—N/a		2:08.91	3rd place, bronze medalist(s)
Ben Armbruster	50 m butterfly	23.13	2 Q	22.82	1 Q	22.73 GR	1st place, gold medalist(s)
Kyle Chalmers	50 m butterfly	23.07	1 Q	22.82	1 Q	22.73 GR	1st place, gold medalist(s)
Cameron McEvoy	50 m butterfly	23.74	6 Q	23.41	3 Q	22.92	3rd place, bronze medalist(s)
Ben Armbruster	100 m butterfly	51.74	4 Q	51.32	4 Q	50.58	3rd place, bronze medalist(s)
Matthew Temple	100 m butterfly	51.30	1 Q	50.63 GR	1 Q	50.43	2nd place, silver medalist(s)
Harrison Turner	100 m butterfly	52.26	6 Q	51.69	5 Q	51.17	4
Col Pearse	100 m butterfly S10	58.68	2 Q	—N/a		57.49	2nd place, silver medalist(s)
Alex Saffy	100 m butterfly S10	59.49	3 Q	—N/a		57.11	1st place, gold medalist(s)
Se-Bom Lee	200 m butterfly	2:00.80	11	—N/a		did not advance	
Matthew Temple	200 m butterfly	1:59.06	8 Q	—N/a		1:55.45	3rd place, bronze medalist(s)
Harrison Turner	200 m butterfly	1:56.47	1 Q	—N/a		1:55.38	2nd place, silver medalist(s)
William Petric	200 m individual medley	1:58.70	1 Q	—N/a		1:57.87	4
Brendon Smith	200 m individual medley	1:59.02	6 Q	—N/a		1:59.01	8
Se-Bom Lee	400 m individual medley	4:21.97	6 Q	—N/a		4:16.96	6
William Petric	400 m individual medley	4:16.54	2 Q	—N/a		4:11.02	2nd place, silver medalist(s)
Brendon Smith	400 m individual medley	4:19.09	5 Q	—N/a		4:12.63	4
Kyle Chalmers; Jamie Jack^{[b]} William Petric^{[b]} Edward Sommerville^{[b]} Flynn Southam; Kai Taylor; Matthew Temple^{[b]} Harrison Turner	4 × 100 m freestyle relay	3:14.53	1 Q	—N/a		3:09.49 GR	1st place, gold medalist(s)
William Petric^{[b]} Samuel Short; Brendon Smith^{[b]} Edward Sommerville; Kai Taylor; Harrison Turner; Elijah Winnington^{[b]}	4 × 200 m freestyle relay	7:08.66	1 Q	—N/a		7:01.47 GR	1st place, gold medalist(s)
Henry Allan; Ben Armbruster^{[b]} Isaac Cooper^{[b]} Jamie Jack^{[b]} Flynn Southam; Zac Stubblety-Cook^{[b]} Matthew Temple; Sam Williamson	4 × 100 m medley relay	3:34.67	1 Q	—N/a		3:28.71 GR	1st place, gold medalist(s)

Women

Athlete	Event	Heat		Semifinal		Final	
Athlete	Event	Time	Rank	Time	Rank	Time	Rank
Meg Harris	50 m freestyle	24.38	1 Q	24.18	1 Q	24.23	1st place, gold medalist(s)
Shayna Jack	50 m freestyle	24.46	2 Q	24.42	2 Q	24.57	3rd place, bronze medalist(s)
Alexandria Perkins	50 m freestyle	24.96	3 Q	24.77	3 Q	24.53	2nd place, silver medalist(s)
Kirralee Hayes	50 m freestyle S13	27.69	1 Q	—N/a		27.63	1st place, gold medalist(s)
Mia Hogan	50 m freestyle S13	29.26	4 Q	—N/a		29.26	4
Jenna Jones	50 m freestyle S13	29.09	3 Q	—N/a		29.02	3rd place, bronze medalist(s)
Meg Harris	100 m freestyle	53.91	1 Q	53.39	2 Q	52.90	1st place, gold medalist(s)
Shayna Jack	100 m freestyle	55.28	9 Q	53.67	3 Q	53.38	3rd place, bronze medalist(s)
Mollie O'Callaghan	100 m freestyle	54.37	2 Q	53.29	1 Q	53.25	2nd place, silver medalist(s)
Emily Beecroft	100 m freestyle S9	1:04.83	2 Q	—N/a		1:03.56	2nd place, silver medalist(s)
Victoria Belando Nicholson	100 m freestyle S9	1:05.65	3 Q	—N/a		1:04.73	4
Lakeisha Patterson	100 m freestyle S9	1:04.45	1 Q	—N/a		1:02.99	1st place, gold medalist(s)
Kirralee Hayes	100 m freestyle S13	1:05.24	4 Q	—N/a		1:04.42	3rd place, bronze medalist(s)
Mia Hogan	100 m freestyle S13	1:05.29	6 Q	—N/a		1:05.02	5
Jenna Jones	100 m freestyle S13	1:04.67	1 Q	—N/a		1:03.89	1st place, gold medalist(s)
Inez Miller	200 m freestyle	1:57.45	3 Q	—N/a		1:56.27	5
Mollie O'Callaghan	200 m freestyle	1:58.22	4 Q	—N/a		1:54.66	1st place, gold medalist(s)
Lani Pallister	200 m freestyle	1:57.02	1 Q	—N/a		1:55.01	2nd place, silver medalist(s)
Madeleine McTernan	200 m freestyle S14	2:11.20	4 Q	—N/a		2:11.38	5
Jenna Forrester	400 m freestyle	4:07.34	3 Q	—N/a		4:05.25	3rd place, bronze medalist(s)
Lani Pallister	400 m freestyle	4:06.88	2 Q	—N/a		3:59.56	1st place, gold medalist(s)
Amelia Weber	400 m freestyle	4:08.12	4 Q	—N/a		4:08.70	4
Tiana Kritzinger	800 m freestyle	—N/a				8:33.28	5
Lani Pallister	800 m freestyle	—N/a				8:11.12 GR	1st place, gold medalist(s)
Molly Walker	800 m freestyle	—N/a				8:25.93	3rd place, bronze medalist(s)
Tiana Kritzinger	1500 m freestyle	—N/a				16:11.18	6
Lani Pallister	1500 m freestyle	—N/a				15:41.03	1st place, gold medalist(s)
Molly Walker	1500 m freestyle	—N/a				16:01.37	3rd place, bronze medalist(s)
Iona Anderson	50 m backstroke	28.17	4 Q	27.69	2 Q	27.45	2nd place, silver medalist(s)
Hannah Fredericks	50 m backstroke	28.61	8 Q	28.50	8 Q	28.49	8
Iona Anderson	100 m backstroke	59.86	1 Q	1:00.11	3 Q	58.71	1st place, gold medalist(s)
Hannah Fredericks	100 m backstroke	1:00.18	3 Q	1:00.10	2 Q	1:00.17	4
Victoria Belando Nicholson	100 m backstroke S9	1:15.79	2 Q	—N/a		1:15.11	3rd place, bronze medalist(s)
Jasmin Fullgrabe	100 m backstroke S9	1:16.48	4 Q	—N/a		1:16.22	4
Gemma Sellick	100 m backstroke S9	1:15.38	1 Q	—N/a		1:14.06	2nd place, silver medalist(s)
Iona Anderson	200 m backstroke	2:11.08	5 Q	—N/a		2:09.77	6
Jenna Forrester	200 m backstroke	2:09.81	3 Q	—N/a		2:08.17	1st place, gold medalist(s)
Hannah Fredericks	200 m backstroke	2:10.03	1 Q	—N/a		2:09.02	3rd place, bronze medalist(s)
Tara Kinder	50 m breaststroke	31.88	11 Q	32.05	12	did not advance	
Sienna Toohey	50 m breaststroke	30.72	2 Q	30.58	1 Q	30.54	2nd place, silver medalist(s)
Ella Ramsay	100 m breaststroke	1:06.99	3 Q	1:07.47	6 Q	1:07.16	4
Tara Kinder	100 m breaststroke	1:08.46	10 Q	1:08.50	9	did not advance	
Sienna Toohey	100 m breaststroke	1:07.30	5 Q	1:06.69	3 Q	1:06.47	3rd place, bronze medalist(s)
Alyssa Gillespie	100 m breaststroke SB8	1:32.20	4 Q	—N/a		1:32.80	4
Gemma Sellick	100 m breaststroke SB8	1:35.37	5 Q	—N/a		1:33.95	5
Tara Kinder	200 m breaststroke	2:26.99	2 Q	—N/a		2:26.95	6
Ella Ramsay	200 m breaststroke	2:27.37	5 Q	—N/a		2:24.89	4
Sienna Toohey	200 m breaststroke	DNS		—N/a		did not advance	
Alexandria Perkins	50 m butterfly	25.55	1 Q	25.48	1 Q	25.37	1st place, gold medalist(s)
Elizabeth Dekkers	50 m butterfly	27.26	15 Q	27.17	14	did not advance	
Brittany Castelluzzo	100 m butterfly	57.91	1 Q	57.64	2 Q	57.40	4
Elizabeth Dekkers	100 m butterfly	59.31	8 Q	58.58	8 Q	59.28	7
Alexandria Perkins	100 m butterfly	58.29	4 Q	57.16	1 Q	56.38	1st place, gold medalist(s)
Brittany Castelluzzo	200 m butterfly	2:10.46	4 Q	—N/a		2:06.56	1st place, gold medalist(s)
Jessica Cole	200 m butterfly	2:11.36	6 Q	—N/a		2:11.17	6
Elizabeth Dekkers	200 m butterfly	2:08.64	2 Q	—N/a		2:06.91	3rd place, bronze medalist(s)
Jenna Forrester	200 m individual medley	2:10.92	1 Q	—N/a		2:09.24	1st place, gold medalist(s)
Tara Kinder	200 m individual medley	2:11.90	5 Q	—N/a		2:11.09	6
Ella Ramsay	200 m individual medley	2:12.42	6 Q	—N/a		2:10.83	5
Jasmine Greenwood	200 m individual medley SM10	2:35.30	3 Q	—N/a		2:32.12	2nd place, silver medalist(s)
Jenna Forrester	400 m individual medley	4:40.61	2 Q	—N/a		4:31.19	1st place, gold medalist(s)
Tara Kinder	400 m individual medley	4:41.81	3 Q	—N/a		4:42.08	5
Ella Ramsay	400 m individual medley	4:42.75	4 Q	—N/a		4:37.12	3rd place, bronze medalist(s)
Hannah Casey^{[b]} Brittany Castelluzzo^{[b]} Jessica Cole^{[b]} Meg Harris; Shayna Jack; Inez Miller^{[b]} Mollie O'Callaghan; Alexandria Perkins	4 × 100 m freestyle relay	3:37.95	1 Q	—N/a		3:31.40	1st place, gold medalist(s)
Hannah Casey; Inez Miller; Mollie O'Callaghan; Lani Pallister	4 × 200 m freestyle relay	—N/a				7:42.53	1st place, gold medalist(s)
Iona Anderson; Brittany Castelluzzo^{[b]} Hannah Fredericks^{[b]} Meg Harris; Mollie O'Callaghan^{[b]} Alexandria Perkins; Sienna Toohey	4 × 100 m medley relay	4:01.14	1 Q	—N/a		3:54.25 GR	1st place, gold medalist(s)

Mixed

Athlete	Event	Heat		Final	
Athlete	Event	Time	Rank	Time	Rank
Hannah Casey^{[b]} Kyle Chalmers; Meg Harris; Shayna Jack; Alexandria Perkins^{[b]} Flynn Southam; Kai Taylor^{[b]} Harrison Turner^{[b]}	4 × 100 m freestyle relay	3:24.83	1 Q	3:19.36 GR	1st place, gold medalist(s)
Iona Anderson; Brittany Castelluzzo^{[b]} Hannah Fredericks^{[b]} Meg Harris; Matthew Temple; Harrison Turner^{[b]} Sam Williamson	4 × 100 m medley relay	3:46.04	1 Q	3:40.46 GR	1st place, gold medalist(s)

^{b} Swimmers who participated in the heats only.

== Track cycling ==
Twenty five athletes selected on 10 June 2026.

Sprint

Athlete	Event	Qualification		Round 1	Quarterfinals	Semifinals	Final / BM	
Athlete	Event	Time	Rank	Opposition Time	Opposition Time	Opposition Time	Opposition Time	Rank
Daniel Barber	Men's sprint	9.672	7 Q	Sahrom (MAS); W	Paul (TTO); L, L	did not advance		
Leigh Hoffman	Men's sprint	9.361	1 Q	Dempster (CAN); W	Awang (MAS); W, W	Ryan (AUS); W, W	Paul (TTO); W, W	1st place, gold medalist(s)
Tayte Ryan	Men's sprint	9.641	5 Q	Craig (SCO); W	Rorke (CAN); W, W	Hoffman (AUS); L, L	Ledingham-Horn (ENG); W, W	3rd place, bronze medalist(s)
Daniel Barber; Ryan Elliott; Leigh Hoffman	Men's team sprint	42.754	1 QG	—N/a			England; W	1st place, gold medalist(s)
Kane Perris; Luke Zaccaria (pilot)	Men's tandem sprint B	9.917	2 Q	—N/a		Ball; Rotherham (pilot) (WAL); L, L	Wahab; Zamri (pilot) (MAS); W, W	3rd place, bronze medalist(s)
Alessia McCaig	Women's sprint	10.677	8 Q	Andrews (NZL); L	did not advance			
Molly McGill	Women's sprint	10.697	10 Q	Marchant (ENG); L	did not advance			
Liliya Tatarinoff	Women's sprint	10.816	12 Q	Edmunds (WAL); L	did not advance			
Kristina Clonan; Alessia McCaig; Molly McGill	Women's team sprint	47.618	4 QB	—N/a			Scotland; L	4
Jessica Gallagher; Jacqui Mengler-Mohr (pilot)	Women's tandem sprint B	11.042	3 Q	—N/a		Unwin; Whitworth-Hay (pilot) (ENG); W, W	Foy; Hodges (pilot) (NZL); W, L, L	2nd place, silver medalist(s)

Keirin

Athlete	Event	Round 1	Repechage	Semifinals	Final
Daniel Barber	Men's keirin	1 Q	—N/a	2 QG	5
Leigh Hoffman	Men's keirin	1 Q	—N/a	1 QG	2nd place, silver medalist(s)
Tayte Ryan	Men's keirin	1 Q	—N/a	1 QG	6
Kristina Clonan	Women's keirin	2 Q	—N/a	3 QG	3rd place, bronze medalist(s)
Alessia McCaig	Women's keirin	1 Q	—N/a	3 QG	4
Liliya Tatarinoff	Women's keirin	3 R	2 Q	6 Q7-12	8

Pursuit

Athlete	Event	Qualification		Final / BM	
Athlete	Event	Time	Rank	Opponent Results	Rank
Oliver Bleddyn	Men's individual pursuit	4:04.132 GR	1 QG	4:03.898 GR	1st place, gold medalist(s)
Conor Leahy	Men's individual pursuit	4:04.147	2 QG	4:07.883	2nd place, silver medalist(s)
James Moriarty	Men's individual pursuit	4:05.677	4 QB	4:04.957	3rd place, bronze medalist(s)
Gordon Allan	Men's individual pursuit C1-3	3:29.652	4 QB	3:31.060	4
Blake Agnoletto; Oliver Bleddyn; Conor Leahy; James Moriarty	Men's team pursuit	3:48.777	1 QG	3:48.223	2nd place, silver medalist(s)
Sophie Edwards	Women's individual pursuit	DQ		did not advance	
Claudia Marcks	Women's individual pursuit	4:32.811	5	did not advance	
Felicity Wilson-Haffenden	Women's individual pursuit	DQ		did not advance	
Tara Neyland	Women's individual pursuit C4-5	4:45.796	1 QG	4:46.614	1st place, gold medalist(s)
Erin Normoyle	Women's individual pursuit C4-5	5:24.264	4 QB	5:34.629	4
Georgia Baker; Sophie Edwards; Claudia Marcks; Alyssa Polites; Felicity Wilson-Haffenden	Women's team pursuit	4:13.469	1 QG	4:10.658 GR	1st place, gold medalist(s)

Time trial

Athlete	Event	Time	Rank
Thomas Cornish	Men's 1 km time trial	1:00.370	5
Leigh Hoffman	Men's 1 km time trial	58.530 GR	1st place, gold medalist(s)
Tayte Ryan	Men's 1 km time trial	59.684	3rd place, bronze medalist(s)
Kane Perris; Luke Zaccaria (pilot)	Men's tandem 1 km time trial B	1:01.873	3rd place, bronze medalist(s)
Gordon Allan	Men's 1 km time trial C1-3	1:07.361	2nd place, silver medalist(s)
Claudia Marcks	Women's 1 km time trial	1:05.607	2nd place, silver medalist(s)
Alessia McCaig	Women's 1 km time trial	1:07.998	11
Liliya Tatarinoff	Women's 1 km time trial	1:06.890	8
Jessica Gallagher; Jacqui Mengler-Mohr (pilot)	Women's tandem 1 km time trial B	1:06.852	2nd place, silver medalist(s)
Tara Neyland	Women's 1 km time trial C4-5	1:08.761	1st place, gold medalist(s)
Erin Normoyle	Women's 1 km time trial C4-5	1:13.542	3rd place, bronze medalist(s)

Points race

Athlete	Event	Qualification		Final	
Athlete	Event	Points	Rank	Points	Rank
Blake Agnoletto	Men's points race	8	7 Q	34	9
Oliver Bleddyn	Men's points race	30	1 Q	80	2nd place, silver medalist(s)
Conor Leahy	Men's points race	15	5 Q	30	10
Georgia Baker	Women's points race	—N/a		51	3rd place, bronze medalist(s)
Sophie Edwards	Women's points race	—N/a		3	13
Alyssa Polites	Women's points race	—N/a		8	12

Scratch race

Athlete	Event	Qualification	Final
Blake Agnoletto	Men's scratch race	8 Q	5
Oliver Bleddyn	Men's scratch race	4 Q	8
Thomas Cornish	Men's scratch race	11 Q	2nd place, silver medalist(s)
Georgia Baker	Women's scratch race	—N/a	1st place, gold medalist(s)
Sophie Edwards	Women's scratch race	—N/a	23
Alyssa Polites	Women's scratch race	—N/a	12

Elimination race

Athlete	Event	Qualification	Final
Blake Agnoletto	Men's elimination race	—N/a	1st place, gold medalist(s)
Thomas Cornish	Men's elimination race	—N/a	7
Georgia Baker	Women's elimination race	—N/a	2nd place, silver medalist(s)
Sophie Edwards	Women's elimination race	—N/a	9
Alyssa Polites	Women's elimination race	—N/a	1st place, gold medalist(s)

== Weightlifting ==
On 18 May 2026, the IWF Commonwealth Games weightlifting ranking lists were finalised. The top eight ranked lifters, limited to one per CGA, and not including Scotland (who got automatic host spots) and the directly qualified reigning Commonwealth Weightlifting champions, gained a quota place for the games in their weight class.

Australia qualified twelve lifters, five male and seven female.

Men

Athlete	Event	Snatch (kg)		Clean & Jerk (kg)		Total (kg)	Rank
Athlete	Event	Result	Rank	Result	Rank	Total (kg)	Rank
Rory Scott	79 kg	135 kg	6	165 kg	6	300 kg	6
Ryven Ewing	88 kg	136 kg	6	170 kg	5	306 kg	5
Oliver Saxton	94 kg	156 kg	2	180 kg	4	336 kg	3rd place, bronze medalist(s)
Ridge Barredo	110 kg	155 kg	5	—N/a		DNF	

Women

Athlete	Event	Snatch (kg)		Clean & Jerk (kg)		Total (kg)	Rank
Athlete	Event	Result	Rank	Result	Rank	Total (kg)	Rank
Brenna Kean	53 kg	73 kg	9	—N/a		DNF	
Ashley Kolomoisky	58 kg	84 kg	5	104 kg	6	188 kg	5
Kiana Elliott	63 kg	99 kg	3	115 kg	4	214 kg	4
Nya Hayman	69 kg	97 kg	3	121 kg	3	218 kg	3rd place, bronze medalist(s)
Isabella Andueza	77 kg	—N/a		—N/a		DNF	
Eileen Cikamatana	86 kg	108 kg	2	140 kg GR	1	248 kg GR	1st place, gold medalist(s)
