= Swimming at the 2026 Commonwealth Games – Women's 4 × 100 metre medley relay =

Women's 4 × 100 metre medley relay at the 2026 Commonwealth Games
- Venue: Tollcross International Swimming Centre
- Dates: 29 July
- Winning time: 4:01.14

Medalists
gold medal	Iona Anderson; Sienna Toohey; Alexandria Perkins; Meg Harris; Brittany Castelluzzo; Hannah Fredericks; Mollie O'Callaghan	Australia
silver medal	Katie Shanahan; Angharad Evans; Keanna MacInnes; Evelyn Davis; Holly McGill; Anna Morgan; Ciara Schlosshan; Emma Wood	Scotland
bronze medal	Olivia Nel; Aimee Canny; Erin Gallagher; Rebecca Meder; Georgia Nel; Jessica Thompson; Lara van Niekerk	South Africa

The women's 4 × 100 metre medley relay event at the 2026 Commonwealth Games will be held on 29 July at the Tollcross International Swimming Centre.

== Schedule ==
The schedule is as follows:

All times are British Summer Time (UTC+1)

Date	Time	Round
Wednesday 29 July 2026	10:30	Heats
Wednesday 29 July 2026	19:00	Final

== Results ==
=== Heats ===
The heats will be held on the morning of 29 July 2026.

Heat results
Rank	Heat	Lane	Nation	Swimmers	Time	Notes
1	2	4	Australia	Hannah Fredericks; Sienna Toohey; Brittany Castelluzzo; Mollie O'Callaghan	4:01.14	Q
2	2	5	Scotland	Holly McGill; Anna Morgan; Ciara Schlosshan; Emma Wood	4:05.23	Q
3	2	3	England	Freya Colbert; Gabrielle Idle-Beavers; Amalie Smith; Erin Little	4:05.57	Q
4	2	6	Wales	Bex Sutton; Amy Crowley; Medi Harris; Sophie Davies	4:06.35	Q
5	1	4	Canada	Kylie Masse; Sophie Angus; Julie Brousseau; Madison Kryger	4:07.19	Q
6	1	5	South Africa	Jessica Thompson; Lara van Niekerk; Erin Gallagher; Georgia Nel	4:08.34	Q
7	1	3	Northern Ireland	Lottie Cullen; Grace Davison; Alana Burns-Atkin; Emily Hughes	4:14.49	Q
8	1	2	Guernsey	Tatiana Tostevin; Oriana Wheeler; Orla Rabey; Tallulah-Mae Rautenbach	4:22.15	Q
9	2	2	Isle of Man	Elizabeth Curphey; Laura Kinley; Kiera Prentice; Ella Justice	4:31.68	R
	1	6	Cayman Islands	Riley Watson; Sierrah Broadbelt; Kyra Rabess; Harper Barrowman	DSQ	

=== Final ===
The final will take place during of the evening of 29 July 2026.

Final results
Rank	Lane	Nation	Swimmers	Time	Notes
1st place, gold medalist(s)	4	Australia	Iona Anderson; Sienna Toohey; Alex Perkins; Meg Harris	3:54.25	
2nd place, silver medalist(s)	5	Scotland	Katie Shanahan; Angharad Evans; Keanna Macinnes; Evelyn Davis	3:57.02	
3rd place, bronze medalist(s)	7	South Africa	Olivia Nel; Aimee Canny; Erin Gallagher; Rebecca Mader	3:58.58	
4	2	Canada	Kylie Masse; Sophie Angus; Ella Jansen; Madison Kryger	3:58.70	
5	3	England	Lauren Cox; Amalie Smith; Emily Richards; Freya Colbert	4:00.74	
6	6	Wales	Bex Sutton; Amy Crowley; Medi Harris; Theodora Taylor	4:04.44	
7	1	Northern Ireland	Lottie Cullen; Ellie McCartney; Alana Burns-Atkin; Grace Davison	4:05.85	
8	8	Guernsey	Tatiana Tostevin; Oriana Wheeler; Orla Rabey; Tallulah-Mae Rautenbach	4:21.66	
