= Swimming at the 2026 Commonwealth Games – Women's 50 metre freestyle S13 =

Women's 50 metre freestyle S13 at the 2026 Commonwealth Games
- Venue: Tollcross International Swimming Centre
- Dates: 28 July
- Competitors: 9 from 6 nations

Medalists
gold medal	Kirralee Hayes	Australia
silver medal	Danika Vyncke	South Africa
bronze medal	Jenna Jones	Australia

The women's 50 metre freestyle S13 event at the 2026 Commonwealth Games was held on 28 July at the Tollcross International Swimming Centre.

== Schedule ==
The schedule is as follows:

All times are British Summer Time (UTC+1)

Date	Time	Round
Tuesday 28 July 2026	10:30	Heat
Tuesday 28 July 2026	19:00	Final

== Results ==
=== Heat ===
The heat was held on the morning of 28 July 2026.

Heat results
Rank	Heat	Lane	Swimmer	Nation	Time	Notes
1	2	4	Kirralee Hayes (S13)	Australia	27.69	Q
2	2	3	Danika Vyncke (S13)	South Africa	28.78	Q
3	2	5	Jenna Jones (S12)	Australia	29.09	Q
4	1	4	Mia Hogan (S13)	Australia	29.26	Q
5	2	6	Ela Letton-Jones (S12)	Wales	29.92	Q
6	1	6	Ursula Carroll (S13)	England	30.10	Q
7	1	3	Astrid Carroll (S12)	Scotland	30.71	Q
7	1	5	Rebecca Redfern (S13)	England	30.74	Q
9	2	2	Alani Ferreira (S13)	South Africa	31.44	R

=== Final ===
The final took place during of the evening of 28 July 2026.

Final results
Rank	Lane	Swimmer	Nation	Time	Notes
1st place, gold medalist(s)	4	Kirralee Hayes	Australia	27.63	(S13)
2nd place, silver medalist(s)	5	Danika Vyncke	South Africa	28.41	(S13) AF
3rd place, bronze medalist(s)	3	Jenna Jones	Australia	29.02	(S12)
4	6	Mia Hogan	Australia	29.26	(S13)
5	7	Ursula Carroll	England	29.37	(S13)
6	2	Ela Letton-Jones	Wales	29.55	(S12)
7	1	Astrid Carroll	Scotland	30.21	(S12)
8	8	Rebecca Redfern	England	31.04	(S13)
