= Swimming at the 2026 Commonwealth Games – Women's 400 metre individual medley =

Women's 400 metre individual medley at the 2026 Commonwealth Games
- Venue: Tollcross International Swimming Centre
- Dates: 27 July
- Winning time: 4:31.19

Medalists
gold medal	Jenna Forrester	Australia
silver medal	Amalie Smith	England
bronze medal	Ella Ramsay	Australia

The women's 400 metre individual medley event at the 2026 Commonwealth Games was held on 27 July at the Tollcross International Swimming Centre.

== Schedule ==
The schedule is as follows:

All times are British Summer Time (UTC+1)

Date	Time	Round
Monday 27 July 2026	10:30	Heats
Monday 27 July 2026	19:00	Final

== Results ==
=== Heats ===
The heats will be held on the morning of 27 July 2026.

Heat results
Rank	Heat	Lane	Swimmer	Nation	Time	Notes
1	1	4	Amalie Smith	England	4:39.13	Q
2	2	4	Jenna Forrester	Australia	4:40.61	Q
3	1	5	Tara Kinder	Australia	4:41.81	Q
4	2	5	Ella Ramsay	Australia	4:42.75	Q
5	2	3	Ella Jansen	Canada	4:45.19	Q
6	1	3	Julie Brousseau	Canada	4:51.45	Q
7	2	6	Evi Mackie	Scotland	4:53.45	Q
8	1	6	Clara Ginnis	Jersey	5:05.83	Q
9	1	2	Hannah Sterry	Jersey	5:09.85	R
10	2	2	Oriana Wheeler	Guernsey	5:10.32	R
11	1	7	Meral Ayn Latheef	Maldives	6:03.71	
	2	7	Riley Watson	Cayman Islands		DNS

=== Final ===
The final took place during of the evening of 27 July 2026.

Final results
Rank	Lane	Swimmer	Nation	Time	Notes
1st place, gold medalist(s)	5	Jenna Forrester	Australia	4:31.19	
2nd place, silver medalist(s)	4	Amalie Smith	England	4:33.70	
3rd place, bronze medalist(s)	6	Ella Ramsay	Australia	4:37.12	
4	2	Ella Jansen	Canada	4:39.12	
5	3	Tara Kinder	Australia	4:42.08	
6	7	Julie Brousseau	Canada	4:45.43	
7	1	Evi Mackie	Scotland	4:51.19	
8	8	Clara Ginnis	Jersey	5:04.73	
