= Swimming at the 2026 Commonwealth Games – Men's 4 × 200 metre freestyle relay =

Men's 4 × 200 metre freestyle relay at the 2026 Commonwealth Games
- Venue: Tollcross International Swimming Centre
- Dates: 26 July
- Winning time: 7:01.47 GR

Medalists
gold medal	Samuel Short; Harrison Turner; Edward Sommerville; Kai Taylor; William Petric*; Brendon Smith*; Elijah Winnington*	Australia
silver medal	Gabriel Shepherd; Thomas Dean; James Guy; Max Litchfield; Cameron Brooker*; Jacob Whittle*; Jacob Mills*	England
bronze medal	Matt Richards; Dan Jones; Kieran Bird; Tyler Melbourne-Smith; Harry Milne*; Jack Knight*; Lewis Fraser*	Wales

The men's 4 × 200 metre freestyle relay event at the 2026 Commonwealth Games will be held on 26 July at the Tollcross International Swimming Centre.

== Schedule ==
The schedule is as follows:

All times are British Summer Time (UTC+1)

Date	Time	Round
Sunday 26 July 2026	10:30	Heats
Sunday 26 July 2026	19:00	Final

== Results ==
=== Heats ===
The heats were held on the morning of 26 July 2026.

Heat results
Rank	Heat	Lane	Nation	Swimmers	Time	Notes
1	2	4	Australia	William Petric (1:47.31); Brendon Smith (1:48.09); Elijah Winnington (1:47.10); Edward Sommerville (1:46.16)	7:08.66	Q
2	1	4	Scotland	Charlie Hutchison (1:50.21); George Smith (1:48.65); Matthew Ward (1:48.98); Luke Hornsey (1:49.34)	7:17.18	Q
3	2	5	England	Cameron Brooker (1:49.75); Jacob Whittle (1:51.22); Jacob Mills (1:48.47); Max Litchfield (1:48.69)	7:18.13	Q
4	1	5	Wales	Harry Milne (1:50.68); Jack Knight (1:52.93); Lewis Fraser (1:55.17); Kieran Bird (1:56.27)	7:35.05	Q
5	1	3	Malaysia	Khiew Hoe Yean (1:53.60); Arvin Chahal (1:52.40); Lim Yin Chuen (1:54.14); Tan Khai Xin (1:59.24)	7:39.38	Q
6	2	6	India	Dhakshan Shashikumar (1:53.31); Aneesh Gowda (1:53.73); Aryan Nehra (1:56.64); Srihari Nataraj (1:55.80)	7:39.48	Q
7	2	2	Jersey	Sam Sterry (1:52.69); Matthew Deffains (1:55.05); Isaac Dodds (1:54.93); Oscar Dodds (1:58.32)	7:40.99	Q
8	1	2	Cayman Islands	Connor Macdonald (1:55.80); Elijah Bain (1:57.91); Will Sellars (2:02.94); James Allison (1:51.99)	7:48.64	Q NR
9	1	6	Isle of Man	Peter Allen (1:55.53); Joel Watterson (1:57.52); Oscar Maddrell (1:59.98); Magnus Kelly (1:57.98)	7:51.01	
	2	3	Canada			DNS

=== Final ===
The final took place during of the evening of 26 July 2026.

Final results
Rank	Lane	Nation	Swimmers	Time	Notes
1st place, gold medalist(s)	4	Australia	Samuel Short (1:46.08); Harrison Turner (1:45.95); Edward Sommerville (1:45.34); Kai Taylor (1:44.10)	7:01.47	GR
2nd place, silver medalist(s)	3	England	Gabriel Shepherd (1:46.87); Thomas Dean (1:45.63); James Dean (1:44.03); Max Litchfield (1:48.65)	7:04.98	
3rd place, bronze medalist(s)	6	Wales	Matt Richards (1:45.42); Dan Jones (1:49.13); Kieran Bird (1:47.54); Tyler Melbourne-Smith (1:47.50)	7:09.59	
4	5	Scotland	George Smith (1:49.65); Matthew Ward (1:48.55); Evan Jones (1:47.33); Duncan Scott (1:45.58)	7:11.11	
5	2	Malaysia	Khiew Hoe Yean (1:51.03); Arvin Chahal (1:49.93); Lim Yin Chuen (1:51.26); Tan Khai Xin (1:51.50)	7:23.72	
6	7	India	Aneesh Gowda (1:51.52); Dhakshan Shashikumar (1:52.78); Aryan Nehra (1:53.93); Srihari Nataraj (1:51.61)	7:29.84	
7	1	Jersey	Sam Sterry (1:51.80); Matthew Deffains (1:54.81); Isaac Dodds (1:53.91); Oscar Dodds (1:56.38)	7:36.90	
8	8	Cayman Islands	James Allison (1:50.43); Connor Macdonald (1:56.02); Elijah Bain (1:59.21); Will Sellars (2:03.56)	7:49.22	
