= Swimming at the 2026 Commonwealth Games – Men's 400 metre individual medley =

Men's 400 metre individual medley at the 2026 Commonwealth Games
- Venue: Tollcross International Swimming Centre
- Dates: 28 July
- Winning time: 4:08.72

Medalists
gold medal	Lewis Clareburt	New Zealand
silver medal	William Petric	Australia
bronze medal	Lorne Wigginton	Canada

The men's 400 metre individual medley event at the 2026 Commonwealth Games was held on 28 July at the Tollcross International Swimming Centre.

== Schedule ==
The schedule is as follows:

All times are British Summer Time (UTC+1)

Date	Time	Round
Tuesday 28 July 2026	10:30	Heats
Tuesday 28 July 2026	19:00	Final

== Results ==
=== Heats ===
The heats was held on the morning of 28 July 2026.

Heat results
Rank	Heat	Lane	Swimmer	Nation	Time	Notes
1	2	4	Lewis Clareburt	New Zealand	4:16.49	Q
2	1	4	William Petric	Australia	4:16.54	Q
3	2	5	Max Litchfield	England	4:16.82	Q
4	1	3	Lorne Wigginton	Canada	4:17.23	Q
5	1	5	Brendon Smith	Australia	4:19.09	Q
6	2	3	Se-Bom Lee	Australia	4:21.97	Q
7	2	6	Charlie Hutchison	Scotland	4:23.90	Q
8	1	7	Tan Khai Xin	Malaysia	4:25.64	Q
9	1	6	Oliver Durand	Namibia	4:27.85	R
10	2	2	Samuel Sterry	Jersey	4:30.74	R
11	2	7	Mohamed Rihan Shiham	Maldives	5:09.68	NR
	1	2	Isaac Thompson	Jersey	DNS	

=== Final ===
The final took place during of the evening of 28 July 2026.

Final results
Rank	Lane	Swimmer	Nation	Time	Notes
1st place, gold medalist(s)	4	Lewis Clareburt	New Zealand	4:08.72	
2nd place, silver medalist(s)	5	William Petric	Australia	4:11.02	
3rd place, bronze medalist(s)	6	Lorne Wigginton	Canada	4:11.38	
4	2	Brendon Smith	Australia	4:12.63	
5	3	Max Litchfield	England	4:14.18	
6	7	Se-Bom Lee	Australia	4:16.96	
7	1	Charlie Hutchison	Scotland	4:22.36	
8	8	Tan Khai Xin	Malaysia	4:23.29	
