= Swimming at the 2026 Commonwealth Games – Men's 100 metre butterfly S10 =

Men's 100 metre butterfly S10 at the 2026 Commonwealth Games
- Venue: Tollcross International Swimming Centre
- Dates: 24 July
- Competitors: 7 from 4 nations

Medalists
gold medal	Alex Saffy (S10)	Australia
silver medal	Col Pearse (S10)	Australia
bronze medal	Jack Gill (S10)	Canada

The men's 100 metre butterfly S10 event at the 2026 Commonwealth Games was held on 24 July at the Tollcross International Swimming Centre.

== Schedule ==
The schedule is as follows:

All times are British Summer Time (UTC+1)

Date	Time	Round
Friday 24 July 2026	12:20	Heat
Friday 24 July 2026	20:49	Final

== Results ==
=== Heat ===
The heat was held at 12:20 on 24 July 2026.

Heat results
Rank	Lane	Swimmer	Nation	Time	Notes
1	3	Fernando Lu (S10)	Canada	58.23	Q
2	4	Col Pearse (S10)	Australia	58.68	Q
3	5	Alex Saffy (S10)	Australia	59.49	Q
4	2	Alec Elliot (S10)	Canada	1:01.37	Q
5	6	Jack Gill (S10)	Canada	1:01.49	Q
6	7	Barry McClements (S9)	Northern Ireland	1:01.92	Q
7	1	Oliver Carter (S10)	Scotland	1:02.30	Q

=== Final ===
The final was held at 20:49 on 24 July 2026.

Final results
Rank	Lane	Swimmer	Nation	Time	Notes
1st place, gold medalist(s)	3	Alex Saffy (S10)	Australia	57.11	
2nd place, silver medalist(s)	5	Col Pearse (S10)	Australia	57.49	
3rd place, bronze medalist(s)	2	Jack Gill (S10)	Canada	1:00.30	
4	6	Alec Elliot (S10)	Canada	1:01.09	
5	7	Barry McClements (S9)	Northern Ireland	1:01.64	
6	1	Oliver Carter (S10)	Scotland	1:03.50	
	4	Fernando Lu (S10)	Canada		DSQ
