= Athletics at the 2026 Commonwealth Games – Women's 200 metres (T38) =

Women's 200 metres (T38) at the 2026 Commonwealth Games
- Venue: Scotstoun Stadium, Glasgow
- Dates: 31 July 2026 (heats); 1 August (final)
- Winning time: 26.92 seconds

Medalists
gold medal	Rhiannon Clarke	Australia
silver medal	Sophie Hahn	England
bronze medal	Briseis Brittain	Australia

The women's 200 metres (T38) event at the 2026 Commonwealth Games, also referred to as the women's 200 metres T37/38 event, as part of the para-athletics programme, will take place at the Scotstoun Stadium on 31 July and 1 August 2026.

The event is open to female para-athletes in the T37 and T38 classification for ambulant para-athletes with a physical or co-ordination impairment. This is a new event on the Games programme.

== Records ==
Prior to this competition, the existing world and Games records were as follows:

Records T37
World record	25.75	Wen Xiaoyan (CHN)	Kobe, Japan	25 May 2024
Records T38
World record	25.07	Karen Palomeque (COL)	Cali, Colombia	18 May 2025

== Qualification ==
Para athletic event qualification is regulated by a special system organised between Commonwealth Sport and the International Paralympic Committee. Each para athletic event allowed for eight quota places, or 10 in the case of throwing events. All but one quota in each event was available on the basis of the Commonwealth Para Rankings on 31 Match 2026, to a maximum of two per Commonwealth Games Association (CGA), with the remaining quota allocated by Bipartite invitation.

This list did not set a limit on entrants, as other athletes in the same classification, but qualified directly for another event, could enter the event in question, up to a maximum (combined quota, invitation and 'separate event' quota) of three per event per CGA.

In the case of the women's 200 metres (T38), three events - the T37/38 100 metres, 200 metres and long jump - share classifications.

== Entrants ==
There following nations have entered athletics into this event. further athletes may be entered before the commencement of the event.

- Australia (2)
- England (3)
- South Africa (2)
- Wales (1)

== Schedule ==
The schedule is as follows:

Date	Time	Round
31 July 2026	10:00	First round
1 August 2026	18:30	Final

All times are United Kingdom time (UTC+1)

== Results ==
=== Final ===
The final of the women's 200 metres (T38) is scheduled for the morning session of 1 August 2026.

Place	Lane	Athlete	Nation	Time	Notes
1st place, gold medalist(s)	3	Rhiannon Clarke	Australia	26.92	SB
2nd place, silver medalist(s)	2	Sophie Hahn	England	27.53	SB
3rd place, bronze medalist(s)	1	Briseis Brittain	Australia	27.66	SB
4	6	Ella Azura Pardy	Australia	28.00	SB
5	4	Natalie Thirsk	Canada	29.04	SB
6	5	Ali Fewins	England	29.21	SB
7	8	Rosie Porter	England	29.30	
8	7	Sheryl James	South Africa	29.34	SB
				Wind: (+1.3 m/s)	
