= Swimming at the 2026 Commonwealth Games – Women's 100 metre backstroke S9 =

Women's 100 metre backstroke S9 at the 2026 Commonwealth Games
- Venue: Tollcross International Swimming Centre
- Dates: 26 July
- Competitors: 9 from 5 nations
- Winning time: 1:11.93

Medalists
gold medal	Alice Tai	England
silver medal	Gemma Sellick	Australia
bronze medal	Victoria Belando Nicholson	Australia

The women's 100 metre backstroke S9 event at the 2026 Commonwealth Games was held on 26 July at the Tollcross International Swimming Centre.

== Schedule ==
The schedule is as follows:

All times are British Summer Time (UTC+1)

Date	Time	Round
Sunday 26 July 2026	10:30	Heat
Sunday 26 July 2026	19:00	Final

== Results ==
=== Heat ===
The heat were held on the morning of 26 July 2026.

Heat results
Rank	Lane	Swimmer	Nation	Time	Notes
1	2	Gemma Sellick (S9)	Australia	1:15.38	Q
2	1	Victoria Belando Nicholson (S9)	Australia	1:15.79	Q
3	1	Brooklyn Hale (S9)	England	1:15.91	Q
4	1	Jasmin Fullgrabe (S9)	Australia	1:16.48	Q
5	2	Alice Tai (S8)	England	1:16.77	Q
6	2	Isabella Haynes (S9)	England	1:17.28	Q
7	2	Meghan Willis (S9)	Wales	1:17.82	Q
8	1	Toni Shaw (S9)	Scotland	1:17.83	Q
9	2	Danielle Dorris (S7)	Canada	1:26.28	

=== Final ===
The final took place during of the evening of 26 July 2026.

Final results
Rank	Lane	Swimmer	Nation	Time	Notes
1st place, gold medalist(s)	2	Alice Tai (S8)	England	1:11.93	
2nd place, silver medalist(s)	4	Gemma Sellick (S9)	Australia	1:14.06	
3rd place, bronze medalist(s)	5	Victoria Belando Nicholson (S9)	Australia	1:15.11	
4	6	Jasmin Fullgrabe (S9)	Australia	1:16.22	
5	3	Brooklyn Hale (S9)	England	1:16.27	
6	1	Meghan Willis (S9)	Wales	1:16.34	
7	8	Toni Shaw (S9)	Scotland	1:16.88	
8	7	Isabella Haynes (S9)	England	1:17.52	
