= Swimming at the 2026 Commonwealth Games – Women's 100 metre freestyle S9 =

Women's 100 metre freestyle S9 at the 2026 Commonwealth Games
- Venue: Tollcross International Swimming Centre
- Dates: 29 July
- Competitors: 10 from 5 nations

Medalists
gold medal	Lakeisha Patterson	Australia
silver medal	Emily Beecroft	Australia
bronze medal	Toni Shaw	Scotland

The women's 100 metre freestyle S9 event at the 2026 Commonwealth Games was held on 29 July at the Tollcross International Swimming Centre.

== Schedule ==
The schedule is as follows:

All times are British Summer Time (UTC+1)

Date	Time	Round
Wednesday 29 July 2026	10:30	Heat
Wednesday 29 July 2026	19:00	Final

== Results ==
=== Heats ===
The heats were held on the morning of 29 July 2026.

Heat results
Rank	Heat	Lane	Swimmer	Nation	Time	Notes
1	2	4	Lakeisha Patterson (S9)	Australia	1:04.45	Q
2	1	4	Emily Beecroft (S9)	Australia	1:04.83	Q
3	2	5	Victoria Nicholson (S9)	Australia	1:05.65	Q
4	1	5	Toni Shaw (S9)	Scotland	1:05.73	Q
5	1	3	Brooklyn Hale (S9)	England	1:06.66	Q
6	2	6	Evie Lambert (S9)	England	1:07.18	Q
7	1	6	Meghan Willis (S9)	Wales	1:08.42	Q
8	1	2	Husnah Kukundakwe (S8)	Uganda	1:15.70	Q
9	2	2	Condoleeza Nyamisanga Nakazibwe (S9)	Uganda	1:18.45	R
	2	3	Alice Tai (S8)	England	DNS	

=== Final ===
The final took place during of the evening of 29 July 2026.

Final results
Rank	Lane	Swimmer	Nation	Time	Notes
1st place, gold medalist(s)	4	Lakeisha Patterson	Australia	1:02.99	(S9)
2nd place, silver medalist(s)	5	Emily Beecroft	Australia	1:03.56	(S9)
3rd place, bronze medalist(s)	6	Toni Shaw	Scotland	1:04.71	(S9)
4	3	Victoria Belando Nicholson	Australia	1:04.73	(S9)
5	2	Brooklyn Hale	England	1:06.52	(S9)
6	7	Evie Lambert	England	1:07.07	(S9)
7	1	Meghan Willis	Wales	1:07.94	(S9)
8	8	Husnah Kukundakwe	Uganda	1:13.36	(S9)
