= Swimming at the 2022 Commonwealth Games – Women's 50 metre freestyle S13 =

Women's 50 metre freestyle S13 at the 2022 Commonwealth Games
- Venue: Sandwell Aquatics Centre
- Dates: 30 July
- Competitors: 8 from 4 nations
- Winning time: 26.56

Medalists
gold medal	Katja Dedekind	Australia
silver medal	Hannah Russell	England
bronze medal	Kirralee Hayes	Australia

The women's 50 metre freestyle S13 event at the 2022 Commonwealth Games was held on 30 July at the Sandwell Aquatics Centre.

== Results ==
=== Final ===
Rank	Lane	Name	Nationality	Time	Notes
1st place, gold medalist(s)	4	Katja Dedekind	Australia	26.56	WR
2nd place, silver medalist(s)	5	Hannah Russell	England	27.67	
3rd place, bronze medalist(s)	3	Kirralee Hayes	Australia	28.24	
4	6	Jenna Jones	Australia	29.08	
5	2	Rebecca Redfern	England	29.56	
6	7	Abby Kane	Scotland	30.26	
7	8	Alani Ferreira	South Africa	30.89	
8	1	Cornelle Leach	South Africa	31.34	
