= Swimming at the 2026 Commonwealth Games – Men's 200 metre freestyle S14 =

Men's 200 metre freestyle S14 at the 2026 Commonwealth Games
- Venue: Tollcross International Swimming Centre
- Dates: 25 July
- Competitors: 5 from 4 nations
- Winning time: 1:51.66 GR

Medalists
gold medal	William Ellard	England
silver medal	Jack Ireland	Australia
bronze medal	Rhys Darbey	Wales

The men's 200 metre freestyle S14 event at the 2026 Commonwealth Games was held on 25 July at the Tollcross International Swimming Centre. The event was open to athletes with an intellectual impairment. It was won by English swimmer William Ellard, breaking the Commonwealth Games record twice en route to the gold medal.

== Schedule ==
The schedule is as follows:

All times are British Summer Time (UTC+1)

Date	Time	Round
Saturday 25 July 2026	10:30	Heat
Saturday 25 July 2026	19:00	Final

== Results ==
=== Heat ===
The heat will be held on the morning of 25 July 2026.

Heat results
Rank	Lane	Swimmer	Nation	Time	Notes
1	4	William Ellard	England	1:53.52	Q, GR
2	5	Jack Ireland	Australia	1:56.33	Q
3	6	Rhys Darbey	Wales	1:58.20	Q
4	3	Dylan Broom	Wales	1:59.83	Q
5	2	Ethan Khoo	Malaysia	2:05.11	Q

=== Final ===
The final took place during of the evening of 25 July 2026.

Final results
Rank	Lane	Swimmer	Nation	Time	Notes
1st place, gold medalist(s)	4	William Ellard	England	1:51.66	GR
2nd place, silver medalist(s)	5	Jack Ireland	Australia	1:55.22	
3rd place, bronze medalist(s)	3	Rhys Darbey	Wales	1:56.24	
4	2	Ethan Khoo	Malaysia	2:05.25	
	6	Dylan Broom	Wales		DSQ
