= Swimming at the 2026 Commonwealth Games – Women's 200 metre backstroke =

Women's 200 metre backstroke at the 2026 Commonwealth Games
- Venue: Tollcross International Swimming Centre
- Dates: 24 July
- Competitors: 18 from 12 nations
- Winning time: 2:08.17

Medalists
gold medal	Jenna Forrester	Australia
silver medal	Katie Shanahan	Scotland
bronze medal	Hannah Fredericks	Australia

The women's 200 metre backstroke event at the 2026 Commonwealth Games was held on 24 July at the Tollcross International Swimming Centre.

== Schedule ==
The schedule was as follows:

All times are British Summer Time (UTC+1)

Date	Time	Round
Friday 24 July 2026	11:13	Heats
Friday 24 July 2026	19:51	Final

== Results ==
=== Heats ===
The heats were held at 11:13 on 24 July 2026.

Heat results
Rank	Heat	Lane	Swimmer	Nation	Time	Notes
1	1	4	Hannah Fredericks	Australia	2:09.81	Q
2	3	5	Holly McGill	Scotland	2:09.98	Q
3	2	5	Jenna Forrester	Australia	2:10.03	Q
4	2	4	Katie Shanahan	Scotland	2:10.31	Q
5	3	4	Iona Anderson	Australia	2:11.08	Q
6	1	3	Lottie Cullen	Northern Ireland	2:12.23	Q
7	3	6	Grace Davison	Northern Ireland	2:12.24	Q
8	1	5	Madison Kryger	Canada	2:12.36	Q
9	2	3	Hannah Pearse	South Africa	2:12.37	R
10	3	3	Delia Lloyd	Canada	2:14.84	R
11	2	6	Anishta Teeluck	Mauritius	2:21.43	
12	2	2	Megan Hansford	Jersey	2:21.44	
13	1	6	Minagi Rupesinghe	Sri Lanka	2:22.14	
14	3	2	Sierrah Broadbelt	Cayman Islands	2:22.57	
15	3	7	Nafanua Hamilton	Samoa	2:24.14	
16	1	2	Elizabeth Curphey	Isle of Man	2:26.54	
17	2	7	Riley Watson	Cayman Islands	2:27.78	
18	1	7	Angelina Smythe	Seychelles	2:29.46	

=== Final ===
The final was held at 19:51 on 24 July 2026.

Final results
Rank	Lane	Swimmer	Nation	Time	Notes
1st place, gold medalist(s)	3	Jenna Forrester	Australia	2:08.17	
2nd place, silver medalist(s)	6	Katie Shanahan	Scotland	2:08.54	
3rd place, bronze medalist(s)	4	Hannah Fredericks	Australia	2:09.02	
4	5	Holly McGill	Scotland	2:09.16	
5	8	Madison Kryger	Canada	2:09.38	
6	2	Iona Anderson	Australia	2:09.77	
7	1	Grace Davison	Northern Ireland	2:12.25	
8	7	Lottie Cullen	Northern Ireland	2:13.91	
