= Hannah Fredericks =

Australian swimmer (born 2003)

Personal information
- Full name: Hannah Jane Fredericks
- Born: 26 January 2003 (age 23) Chapel Hill, Queensland, Australia

Sport
- Sport: Swimming
- Strokes: Backstroke
- Club: St Peters Western
- Coach: Dean Boxall
Medal record
Women's swimming
Representing Australia
| Event | 1st | 2nd | 3rd |
|---|---|---|---|
| Commonwealth Games | 2 | 0 | 1 |
| Total | 2 | 0 | 1 |
Commonwealth Games
| Gold medal – first place | 2026 Glasgow | 4×100 medley |
| Gold medal – first place | 2026 Glasgow | 4×100 mixed medley |
| Bronze medal – third place | 2026 Glasgow | 200 m backstroke |

Hannah Jane Fredericks (born 26 January 2003) is an Australian swimmer who specialises in backstroke. She represented Australia at the 2025 World Aquatics Championships and is a bronze medallist in the 200 m backstroke at the 2026 Commonwealth Games.

== Career ==
At the 2024 Australian Olympic Trials, Fredericks placed third in the 200 m backstroke with a time of 2:08.25, finishing behind Kaylee McKeown and Jaclyn Barclay.

In 2025, she finished second behind McKeown in the 200 m backstroke at the 2025 Australian Swimming Trials, recording a time of 2:09.54 to qualify for her first senior national team. At the 2025 World Aquatics Championships in Singapore, Fredericks contested all three backstroke events, placing 18th in the 50 m, 11th in the 100 m, and 15th in the 200 m. She also placed fifth as a member of the Australian mixed 4 × 100 m medley relay team.

At the 2026 Australian Swimming Trials, Fredericks placed third in the 200 m backstroke in 2:07.99. She subsequently made her Commonwealth Games debut in Glasgow. In the final of the 200 m backstroke, she won the bronze medal in 2:09.02, finishing behind Jenna Forrester and Katie Shanahan.
