= Swimming at the 2026 Commonwealth Games – Women's 100 metre freestyle S13 =

Women's 100 metre freestyle S13 at the 2026 Commonwealth Games
- Venue: Tollcross International Swimming Centre
- Dates: 24 July
- Competitors: 8 from 5 nations
- Winning time: 1:03.89

Medalists
gold medal	Jenna Jones (S12)	Australia
silver medal	Ela Letton-Jones (S12)	Wales
bronze medal	Kirralee Hayes (S13)	Australia

The women's 100 metre freestyle S13 event at the 2026 Commonwealth Games was held on 24 July at the Tollcross International Swimming Centre.

== Schedule ==
The schedule was as follows:

All times are British Summer Time (UTC+1)

Date	Time	Round
Friday 24 July 2026	11:08	Heat
Friday 24 July 2026	19:23	Final

== Results ==
=== Heat ===
The heat was held at 11:08 on 24 July 2026.

Heat results
Rank	Lane	Swimmer	Nation	Time	Notes
1	4	Jenna Jones (S12)	Australia	1:04.67	Q
2	2	Ela Letton-Jones (S12)	Wales	1:04.73	Q
3	3	Danika Vyncke (S13)	South Africa	1:05.13	Q, AF
4	7	Kirralee Hayes (S13)	Australia	1:05.24	Q
5	6	Ursula Carroll (S13)	England	1:05.25	Q
6	5	Mia Hogan (S13)	Australia	1:05.29	Q
7	1	Astrid Carroll (S12)	Scotland	1:05.84	Q
8	8	Alani Ferreira (S13)	South Africa	1:06.95	Q

=== Final ===
The final was held at 19:23 on 24 July 2026.

Final results
Rank	Lane	Swimmer	Nation	Time	Notes
1st place, gold medalist(s)	4	Jenna Jones (S12)	Australia	1:03.89	
2nd place, silver medalist(s)	5	Ela Letton-Jones (S12)	Wales	1:04.30	
3rd place, bronze medalist(s)	6	Kirralee Hayes (S13)	Australia	1:04.42	
4	3	Danika Vyncke (S13)	South Africa	1:04.68	AF
5	7	Mia Hogan (S13)	Australia	1:05.02	
6	2	Ursula Carroll (S13)	England	1:05.24	
7	1	Astrid Carroll (S12)	Scotland	1:05.38	
8	8	Alani Ferreira (S13)	South Africa	1:06.05	
