= Swimming at the 2022 Commonwealth Games – Men's 100 metre butterfly S10 =

2022 swimming contest

Men's 100 metre butterfly S10 at the 2022 Commonwealth Games
- Venue: Sandwell Aquatics Centre
- Dates: 2 August 2012
- Competitors: 7 from 5 nations
- Winning time: 56.91

Medalists
gold medal	Col Pearse	Australia
silver medal	Alex Saffy	Australia
bronze medal	James Hollis	England

The men's 100 metre butterfly S10 event at the 2022 Commonwealth Games was held on 2 August at the Sandwell Aquatics Centre.

== Schedule ==
The schedule is as follows:

All times are British Summer Time (UTC+1)

Date	Time	Round
Tuesday 2 August 2022	20:45	Final

== Results ==
=== Final ===
Rank	Lane	Name	Nationality	Time	Notes
1st place, gold medalist(s)	5	Col Pearse	Australia	56.91	
2nd place, silver medalist(s)	3	Alex Saffy	Australia	57.53	
3rd place, bronze medalist(s)	2	James Hollis	England	58.55	
4	4	William Martin	Australia	58.73	
5	6	Alec Elliot	Canada	59.38	
6	7	Barry McClements	Northern Ireland	1:02.95	
7	1	Oliver Carter	Scotland	1:04.67	
