= Swimming at the 2020 Summer Paralympics – Men's 100 metre butterfly S10 =

Men's 100 metre butterfly S10 at the XVI Paralympic Games
- Venue: Tokyo Aquatics Centre
- Dates: 31 August 2021
- Competitors: 11 from 10 nations

Medalists
1st place, gold medalist(s)		Maksym Krypak	Ukraine
2nd place, silver medalist(s)		Stefano Raimondi	Italy
3rd place, bronze medalist(s)		Col Pearse	Australia

The men's 100 metre butterfly S10 event at the 2020 Paralympic Games took place on 31 August 2021, at the Tokyo Aquatics Centre.

== Heats ==
The swimmers with the top eight times, regardless of heat, advanced to the final.

Rank	Heat	Lane	Name	Nationality	Time	Notes
1	2	4	Maksym Krypak	Ukraine	57.74	Q
2	1	4	Stefano Raimondi	Italy	58.19	Q
3	2	5	Col Pearse	Australia	58.23	Q, OC
4	1	5	Dmitry Grigoryev	RPC	58.43	Q
5	1	6	Alec Elliot	Canada	58.59	Q
6	2	3	Riccardo Menciotti	Italy	58.85	Q
7	2	6	David Levecq	Spain	59.10	Q
8	1	3	Florent Marais	France	59.23	Q
9	1	2	Alan Ogorzałek	Poland	1:00.72	
10	2	7	Akito Minai	Japan	1:00.97	
11	2	2	Phelipe Rodrigues	Brazil	1:01.00	

== Final ==
100m butterfly final
Rank	Lane	Name	Nationality	Time	Notes
1st place, gold medalist(s)	4	Maksym Krypak	Ukraine	54.15	WR
2nd place, silver medalist(s)	5	Stefano Raimondi	Italy	55.04	
3rd place, bronze medalist(s)	3	Col Pearse	Australia	57.66	
4	8	Florent Marais	France	57.86	
5	2	Alec Elliot	Canada	58.44	
6	6	Dmitry Grigoryev	RPC	58.45	
7	7	Riccardo Menciotti	Italy	58.65	
8	1	David Levecq	Spain	59.12	
