= Sienna Toohey =

Australian swimmer

Personal information
- Born: 9 March 2009 (age 17)

Sport
- Sport: Swimming
- Strokes: Breaststroke
- Club: Albury Amateur Swim Club
Medal record
Women's swimming
Representing Australia
World Championships (LC)
Silver medal – second place	2025 Singapore	4×100 m medley
Commonwealth Games
Gold medal – first place	2026 Glasgow	4×100 m medley
Silver medal – second place	2026 Glasgow	50 m breaststroke
Bronze medal – third place	2026 Glasgow	100 m breaststroke

Sienna Rose Toohey (born 9 March 2009) is an Australian swimmer. She qualified for the 2025 World Aquatics Championships in two events.

== Biography ==
Toohey is from Albury, New South Wales. She has two brothers and her father, Damian, is the principal at Albury High School, where Toohey attends. She started swimming because she wanted to play water polo, before deciding to focus solely on swimming. She is a member of the Albury Amateur Swim Club. Albury has no indoor swimming facilities, and thus Toohey trained "outdoors in all weather conditions".

In 2023, at age 14, Toohey broke five records at the School Sports Australia Championships. She competed at the 2024 Australian Swimming Trials and won the bronze medal in the 100m breaststroke with a time of 1:07.01, breaking the 24-year-old record in her age group held by Leisel Jones, while narrowly missing qualification to the 2024 Summer Olympics by less than a tenth of a second. In August 2024, she competed at the 2024 Junior Pan Pacific Swimming Championships, winning a silver medal in the 100m breaststroke.

At the 2025 Australian Age Championships, Toohey won four gold medals and set two national records in her age group, earning selection to the World Junior Championships. She spent six weeks training in Canberra away from her family in preparation for the 2025 Australian Swimming Trials. There, she set a personal best in the 100m with a time of 1:06.55, finishing first and thus qualifying for the 2025 World Aquatics Championships.
