= Ela Letton-Jones =

Welsh para swimmer

Personal information
- Nationality: Welsh
- Born: Y Felinheli, Gwynedd, Wales

Sport
- Sport: Para swimming
- Disability: Albinism
- Disability class: S12, SM12
Medal record
Women's para swimming
Representing Great Britain
World Championships
Silver medal – second place	2025 Singapore	100 m backstroke S12
Representing Wales
Commonwealth Games
Silver medal – second place	2026 Glasgow	100 m freestyle S13

Ela Letton-Jones (ganwyd c.2007) is a Welsh para swimmer.

== Career ==
On 6 August 2025, Letton-Jones was selected to compete at the 2025 World Para Swimming Championships. She made her World Para Swimming Championships debut and won a silver medal in the 100 metre backstroke S12 event.

== Personal life ==
Letton-Jones, who is a fluent Welsh speaker, has albinism a condition that severely affects her vision.
