= Kirralee Hayes =

Australian Paralympic swimmer

Personal information
- Nationality: Australia
- Born: 26 May 2004 (age 22)

Sport
- Sport: Swimming
- Classifications: S13, SB13, SM13
- Club: Genesis Aquatics
- Coach: Rick Pendleton
Medal record
Women's Paralympic swimming
Representing Australia
Commonwealth Games
Gold medal – first place	2026 Glasgow	50 m freestyle S13
Bronze medal – third place	2022 Birmingham	50 m freestyle S13
Bronze medal – third place	2026 Glasgow	100 m freestyle S13

Kirralee Hayes (born 26 May 2004) is an Australian Paralympic swimmer. She represented Australia at the 2020 Tokyo Paralympics.

== Swimming ==
Hayes, a founding member of the Genesis Aquatics based at Genesis Christian College, qualified for the S13 (vision impaired) 50m Freestyle and 100m Butterfly at the 2020 Summer Paralympics.

At 2021 Australian Swimming Trials, she finished second in Women's 50m Freestyle S13.

At the 2020 Tokyo Paralympics, she swam in two events, the 50 m freestyle S11 and the 100 m butterfly S11 but did not qualify for the finals.

At the 2022 Commonwealth Games, Birmingham, England, she won the bronze medal in the Women's 50 m freestyle S13.

Hayes is based at the Australian Institute of Sport in Canberra and coached by Yuriy Vdovychenko, but regularly returns to train at Genesis Aquatics with her coach Rick Pendleton.
