= Col Pearse =

Australian Paralympic swimmer (born 2003)

Personal information
- Nationality: Australian
- Born: 10 July 2003 (age 23) Echuca, Victoria
- Height: 183 cm (6 ft 0 in)
- Weight: 80 kg (176 lb)

Sport
- Sport: Swimming
- Classifications: S10, SB9, SM10
- Club: Nunawading Swim Club
- Coach: Jol Finck
Medal record
Men's Paralympic swimming
Representing Australia
Paralympic Games
Silver medal – second place	2024 Paris	200 m medley SM10
Bronze medal – third place	2020 Tokyo	100 m butterfly S10
World Championships
Silver medal – second place	2022 Madeira	200 m medley SM10
Silver medal – second place	2022 Madeira	100 m butterfly S10
Silver medal – second place	2023 Manchester	200 m medley SM10
Bronze medal – third place	2019 London	100 m butterfly S10
Bronze medal – third place	2023 Manchester	100 m butterfly S10
Bronze medal – third place	2025 Singapore	100 m butterfly S10
Commonwealth Games
Gold medal – first place	2022 Birmingham	100 m butterfly S10
Silver medal – second place	2026 Glasgow	100 m butterfly S10

Col Pearse (born 10 July 2003) is an Australian Paralympic swimmer. At the 2020 Tokyo Paralympics, he won the bronze medal in the 100 m butterfly S10. At the 2024 Paris Paralympics, he won the silver medal Men's 200 m medley SM10.

== Early life ==
Pearse was born on 10 July 2003 in Echuca, Victoria, to Teena and Julian Pearse. He is the youngest of four children.

At the age of two, Pearse’s right foot was amputated below the ankle after a collision with a ride-on lawnmower. He still has his heel bone intact so he can walk on his stump, though his right side is about 5 cm shorter than his left so he has a pronounced limp.

In 2018, Pearse relocated to Melbourne train with a specialist coach at the H_{2}O Swimming Club. He attended St Michael's Grammar School in Melbourne. In 2023, he was studying a bachelor of sports media at Holmesglen in Melbourne.

In 2024, Pearse was featured in a Woolworths advertising campaign for the Olympic and Paralympic Games in Paris. The campaign is inspired by the true story of his family and the local community helping Pearse with creating a training pool in a dam on his family farm.

== Career ==
Besides swimming, Pearse played junior Australian Rules football for the Lockington Cats under-12s, wearing a blue-and-white hooped prosthetic foot inspired by his beloved Geelong Football Club. In late 2016, he was selected as a member of the Australian Paralympic Development Squad. In 2019, he was selected on his first Australian swim team. At the 2019 World Para Swimming Championships in London, he won the bronze medal in the men's 100 m butterfly S10 and sixth in the men's 100 m backstroke S10 and men's 200 m individual medley SM10.

At the 2020 Tokyo Paralympics, Pearse won the bronze medal in the men's 100 metre butterfly S10 with a time of 57:66, 3 seconds slower than the gold medal winner Maksym Krypak of Ukraine who set a world record. Pearse competed in the men's 200 m individual medley SM10 and made the final where he finished fourth. He also made the final of the men's 100 m backstroke S10 where he finished eighth.

At the 2022 World Para Swimming Championships in Madeira, Pearse won two silver medals - men's 100 m butterfly S10 and Men’s 200 m individual medley SM10.

At the 2022 Commonwealth Games in Birmingham, Pearse won the gold medal in the men's 100 m butterfly S10. At the 2023 World Para Swimming Championships in Manchester, England, Pearse won two medals - silver in the Men's 200 m medley SM10 and bronze in the Men's 100 m butterfly S10.

At the 2024 Paris Paralympics, he won the silver medal in the Men's 200 m medley SM10 and finished fourth in the Men's 100 butterfly S10. After winning the silver medal, Pearse reflected on his regional upbringing by stating ""I think for every Australian back home living with a disability, coming from the middle of nowhere in Australia, we tend to think they'll never go far in life" and "And I think that swim there, it really shows it doesn't matter where you come from or who you are, if you've got a dream it's achievable." At the 2025 World Para Swimming Championships in Singapore, he won the bronze medal in the Men's 100 butterfly S10.

== Recognition ==
- 2021 - awarded a Tier 2 Scholarship within the Sport Australia Hall of Fame Scholarship & Mentoring Program.
- 2022 - Victorian Institute of Sport Para Athlete of the Year
