= Liliya Tatarinoff =

Australian cyclist (born 2006)

Personal information
- Born: 16 July 2006 (age 20)

Cycling career
- Sport: Cycling
- Discipline: Track
- Role: Rider
- Rider type: Track sprinting
Medal record
Women's track cycling
Representing Australia
World Championships
Bronze medal – third place	2025 Santiago	Team sprint

Liliya Tatarinoff (born 16 July 2006) is an Australian track cyclist. She was a bronze medalist in the women's team sprint at the 2025 UCI Track Cycling World Championships.

== Career ==
She is a member of Central Coast Cycling Club in New South Wales. She set Australian record times for the U17 500m Time Trial and in the Team Sprint with NSW in 2022.

At the Trinbago 2023 Youth Commonwealth Games, she won the gold medal in the women’s 500m time trial. She also won two bronze medals in the sprint and keirin events at the Games. She was the U19 500m time trial champion and keirin Oceania champion. She started a scholarship at the NSW Institute of Sport (NSWIS) and was the Australian U19 women sprints champion, junior 500m time trial national champion, junior keiron champion and part of the team sprint winning team in 2024.

She was named as part of the Australian team for her senior debut at the 2025 UCI Track Cycling World Championships in Santiago, Chile. She won a bronze medal at the Championships in the women's team sprint alongside Alessia McCaig, Molly McGill, and Kristine Perkins.

== Major wins ==
2025
UCI Track Cycling World Championships

3rd Team Sprint
