= Alex Saffy =

Australian Paralympic swimmer (born 2005)

Personal information
- Nickname: Bunbury Bullet
- Nationality: Australian
- Born: 1 October 2005 (age 21) Port Elizabeth, South Africa
- Height: 1.74 m (5 ft 9 in)

Sport
- Country: Australia
- Sport: Paralympic swimming
- Disability: Dyskinetic Cerebral Palsy
- Disability class: S10, SM10
- Club: Bunbury Swimming Club
- Coached by: Martin Roberts
Medal record
Paralympic swimming
Representing Australia
Paralympic Games
Bronze medal – third place	2024 Paris	100 m butterfly S10
World Championships
Bronze medal – third place	2022 Madeira	100 m butterfly S10
Bronze medal – third place	2023 Manchester	200 m medley SM10
Commonwealth Games
Gold medal – first place	2026 Glasgow	100 m butterfly S10
Silver medal – second place	2022 Birmingham	100 m butterfly S10

Alex Saffy (born 1 October 2005) is an Australian Paralympic swimmer. He won a bronze medal at the 2022 World Para Swimming Championships and a silver medal at the 2022 Commonwealth Games. He won a bronze medal at the 2024 Paris Paralympics.

== Personal ==
Saffy was born on 1 October 2005 at Port Elizabeth, South Africa. He was diagnosed with Dyskinetic Cerebral Palsy. Saffy attended Bunbury Catholic College and since 2022 lives and trains at the Australian Institute of Sport in Canberra.

== Swimming ==
Saffy was a top age group swimmer during his young teens. He won numerous state medals and qualified for numerous national competitions, despite regular disqualifications and training interruptions, due to his condition, dyskinetic cerebral palsy. In 2021, he competed at the 2021 Australian Open Water Championships, where he placed 4th in the boys 16 years 5km race. Saffy, despite his condition, was .4 of a second from collecting a silver medal. Saffy then received his national classification where he was classed as an S9 swimmer. In June 2021, Saffy attended the Paralympic Trials held in Adelaide, where he qualified for the Tokyo Games. However due to his classification status was unable to attend. In August 2021, he officially broke the Australian Record and unofficially broke the S9 200 Butterfly World Record at age 15. In November 2021, Alex was awarded a prestigious Scholarship from the Wally Foreman Foundation. Saffy become internationally classified in February 2022, where he became an S10 paralympic swimmer.

In early February 2022 he relocated Canberra, ACT, where he was offered a full scholarship to live and train at the Australian Institute of Sport at the age of 16 under coach Martin Roberts. In April 2022, at Australian Trials, Saffy swam a 57.89 to qualify him for the and Commonwealth Games, where he was the youngest on the team. His performances from the World Championships including placing third in the Men's 100 m butterfly S10 and second in the Men's 100 m Butterfly S10 at the 2022 Commonwealth Games, resulted in him being awarded a prestigious scholarship from Sport Australia Hall of Fame as well as being nominated for AIS Discovery Of The Year at the 2022 Swimming Australia Awards night.

Saffy, training under Bunbury Swim Club, won numerous awards from the 2022 Swimming WA awards night. He was the youngest ever athlete to be awarded with 4 awards. In November 2022, Saffy was also named Young WAIS Athlete of the Year.

In 2023, after his performance at the 2023 Australian Trials, he was selected for the 2023 World Para Swimming Championships, where he qualified in the 100 m Butterfly with a time of 57.46. This time put him top three in the world as of April 2023. Saffy, then went on to compete at the 2023 World Para Swimming Championships where he won the bronze medal in the Men's 200 Individual Medley SM10, with a time of 2:16.07.

At the 2024 Paris Paralympics, he won the bronze medal in the Men's 100 m butterfly S10 breaking the Oceania record. He also competed in the Men's 100 m freestyle S10 (8th) and Men's 200 m individual medley SM10.

In 2024, he has an ACT Academy of Sport scholarship and is coach by Olympian Martin Roberts.

== Recognition ==
- 2021 - Wally Foreman Foundation Scholarship
- 2022 - Western Australian Institute of Sport Young Athlete of the Year
- 2022 - AIS Discovery of the Year Nomination
- 2022 - Commonwealth Games Australia Emerging Athlete of the Month
- 2023 - Sport Australia Hall of Fame Scholarship and Mentoring Program - Tier 2 Scholarship
- 2023 - South West Academy of Sport Athlete of the Year
- 2023 - South West Academy of Sport Individual Male Sports Star
