= Jenna Jones =

Australian Paralympic swimmer

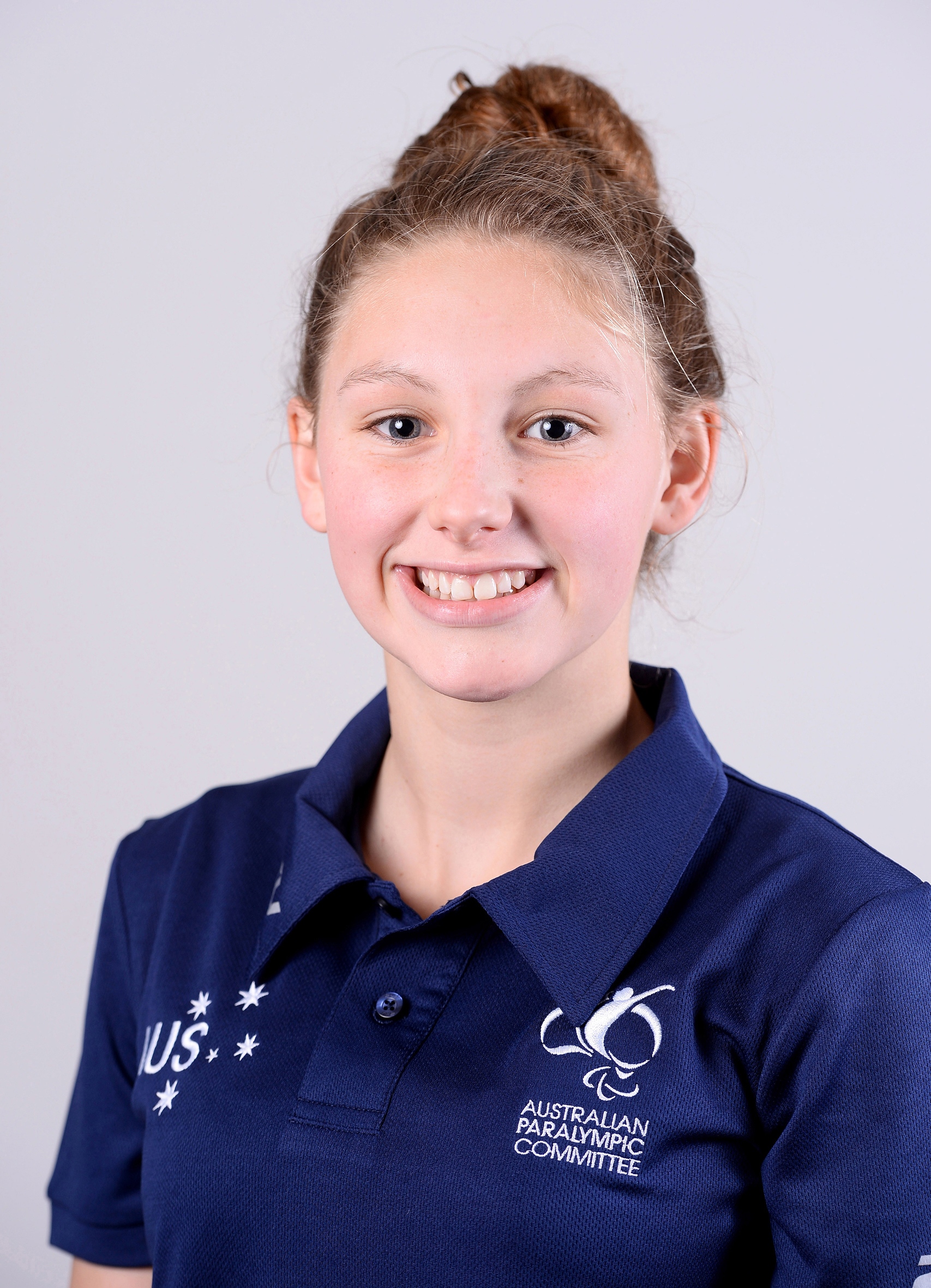
- 2016 Australian Paralympic team portrait

Personal information
- Full name: Jenna Jones
- Nickname: JJ
- Nationality: Australia
- Born: 19 January 2001 (age 25) Maitland, New South Wales

Sport
- Sport: Swimming
- Strokes: Backstroke, breaststroke, freestyle
- Classifications: S12
- Club: USC Swim Club
- Coach: Harley Connolly /Casey Atkins
Medal record
Representing Australia
Women's Paralympic swimming
World Championships
Silver medal – second place	2023 Manchester	100 m backstroke S12
Commonwealth Games
Gold medal – first place	2026 Glasgow	100 m freestyle S13
Bronze medal – third place	2026 Glasgow	50 m freestyle S13

Jenna Jones (born 19 January 2001) is an Australian Paralympic swimmer. She represented Australia at the 2016 Rio Paralympics and the 2024 Paris Paralympics.

== Biography ==
Jenna Jones was born on 19 January 2001, the fifth of six children; she has four older brothers and a younger sister. When she was in kindergarten, she was diagnosed with rod-cone dystrophy, a rare degenerative eye disease.

She attended St Columba's High School. and finished High School Certificate (HSC) at TAFE before she made the life-changing decision to move interstate to the Sunshine Coast.

== Swimming ==
She played a variety of sports, but as her eyesight deteriorated, she settled on swimming. She uses tappers to alert her when she is approaching the end of the pool. She initially had trouble with competitive swimming, as the wash from other swimmers exacerbated the vertigo she felt due to her visual impairment. In 2014, a new coach, Nick Robinson, thought he could help. Under his tutelage, her times improved significantly over the following six months.

Jones competed in her first Australian Open Championships that year, aged 13, and set eleven age records, winning two silver and two bronze medals. At the 2015 Open Championships, she won a silver medal in the 50 metre backstroke event despite battling illness. Then at the 2015 Australian Age Championships, she won six gold and three silver medals, breaking nine Australian and ten New South Wales records in the S13 class, the swimming classification for blind swimmers. She went on to win her first national short course title in the 50 metre backstroke in November 2015.

Although she was targeting the 2020 Summer Paralympics in Tokyo rather than the 2016 Summer Paralympics in Rio, at the 2016 Australian Swimming Championships in Adelaide, she met the Rio qualifying times in the 50, 100 and 400 metre freestyle, 100 metre backstroke and 100 metre breaststroke events, and on 14 April 2016 was named a member of the Australian Paralympic swimming squad.

In 2016, Jones competed at the Rio 2016 Paralympics in five different events. She qualified and finished seventh in the 50 metre freestyle S13 and 100 metre backstroke S13 finals, but didn't qualify for the finals of the 100 metre freestyle S13, 200 metre individual medley SM13 or the 100 metre breaststroke SB13. Coach Robinson worked with Jones in the lead up to Rio to reduce her nausea and vertigo and instructed Jones "But it's your choice, You've gotta start controlling it. In life, you've got to learn to control pain, fear and everything." Reflecting on her preparation to Rio, Jones states "When I am really fit, I feel like I am flying."

At the 2022 Commonwealth Games, Birmingham, England, she finished 4th in the Women's 50 m freestyle S13.

At the 2023 World Para Swimming Championships, Manchester, England, she won the silver medal in the Women's 100 m backstroke S12.

At the 2024 Paris Paralympics, she competed in three events - Women's 100 m freestyle S12 (8th), Women's 100 m backstroke S12 (6th) and Women's 100 m breaststroke SM10 (6th).
