= William Petric =

Australian swimmer (born 2004)

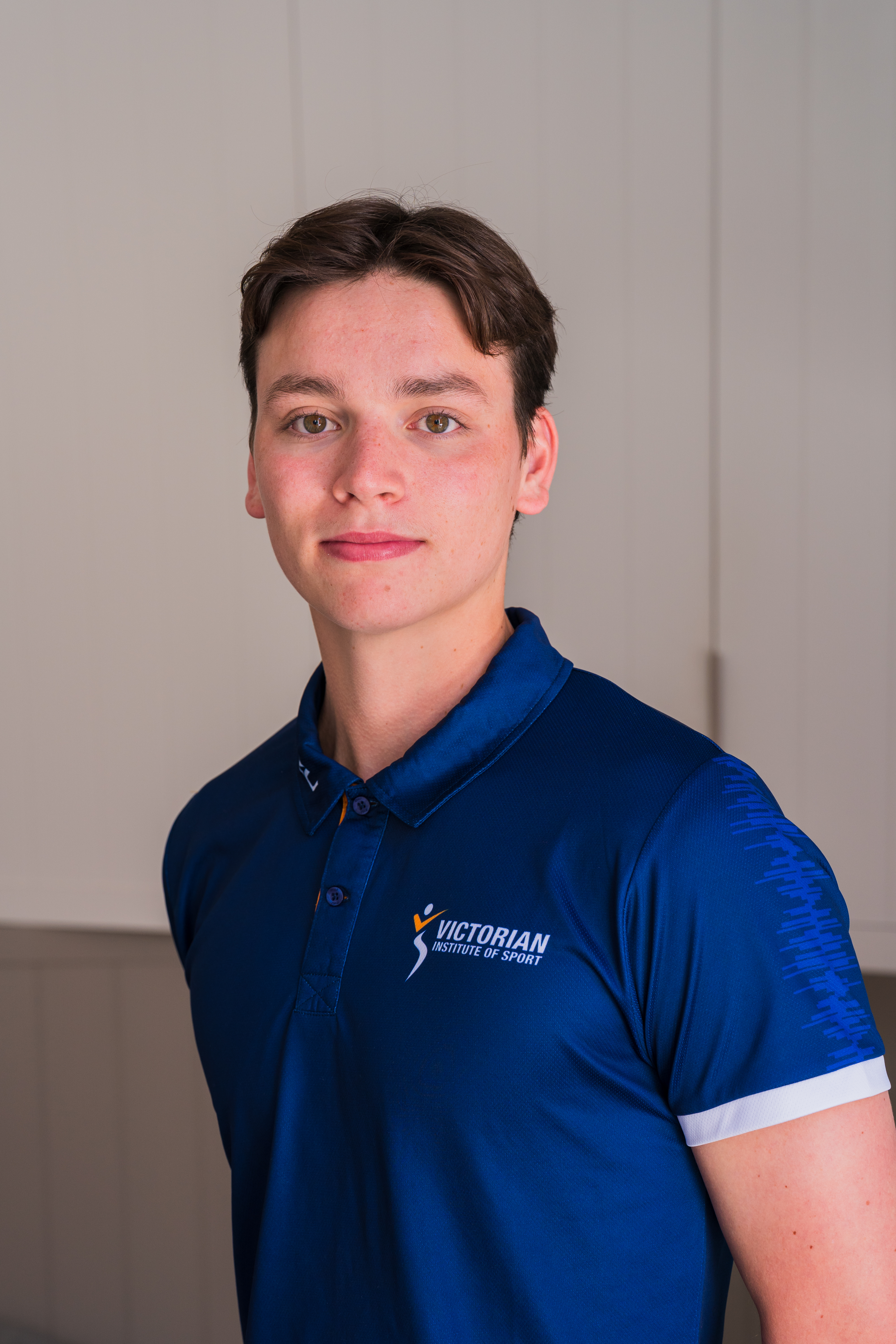
- William Petric - Victorian Institute of Sport

Personal information
- Full name: William Campbell Petric
- Born: 3 August 2004 (age 22) Melbourne, Victoria, Australia

Sport
- Country: Australia
- Sport: Swimming
- Club: Nunawading Swim Club
- Coached by: Jol Finck
Medal record
Men's swimming
Representing Australia
Commonwealth Games
Gold medal – first place	2026 Glasgow	4×100 m freestyle
Gold medal – first place	2026 Glasgow	4×200 m freestyle
Silver medal – second place	2026 Glasgow	400 m medley
Pan Pacific Championships
Bronze medal – third place	2026 Irvine	200 m medley

William Campbell Petric (born 3 August 2004) is an Australian Olympic swimmer.

== Career ==
In 2024, Petric qualified for the Summer Olympics in Paris after placing second in the 400 m individual medley event at the Australian Olympic trials.

In his Olympic debut, Petric finished 12th in the 400 m individual medley and 10th in the semifinal of the 200 m individual medley.

Through a scholarship offered by the Sport Australia Hall of Fame, Petric is mentored by two-time AFL Brownlow Medalist, Chris Judd.
