= Ella Ramsay =

Australian swimmer (born 2004)

Personal information
- Nationality: Australian
- Born: 12 July 2004 (age 22) Ipswich, Queensland, Australia
- Occupation: swimmer
- Parent: Heath Ramsay

Sport
- Sport: Swimming
Medal record
Representing Australia
Olympic Games
Silver medal – second place	2024 Paris	4×100 m medley
World Championships (LC)
Silver medal – second place	2025 Singapore	4×100 m medley
Pan Pacific Championships
Silver medal – second place	2026 Irvine	4×100 m medley
Commonwealth Games
Bronze medal – third place	2026 Glasgow	400 m medley

Ella Ramsay (born 12 July 2004) is an Australian Olympic swimmer who competed at the 2024 Paris Olympics.

== Early life ==
Ramsay was born in 2004 in Ipswich, Queensland. Her father Heath Ramsay had competed for Australia as a butterfly swimmer but he had retired from competitive swimming and ran a swim centre in Ipswich.

== Career ==
Ramsay demonstrated her versatility and performance at the Australian Age Championships in 2021. She raced in the 50, 100 and 200 metres freestyle and 100 and 200 metres breaststroke. She completed both the 200m and 400m individual medleys. She earned fourteen medals and in the following year, she defended her position in five different disciplines.

She came to international notice when she took a leg of the 200m individual medley at the 2022 Commonwealth Games in Birmingham, England.

Her father had been her coach, but she moved on to Dean Boxall at St Peter’s Western Club in Brisbane. She took silver in the 100 metres breaststroke and gold in the 200 metres at the 2024 AUS Olympic Trials qualifying her for an Olympic place. She also came second in the 200-metre individual medley. Her final qualification for herself and Australia was her fast time for the 400m individual medley, which was 4:36.56.

Ramsay was in the Australian swimming team at the 2024 Paris Olympics. She was scheduled to compete in four events. She was to compete in breaststroke at both 100 and 200 metres and to race in the medleys at both 200m individual and in the 4 × 100 m medley relay.

She and Jenna Forrester were both in the same 400m individual medley heat for Australia. Ramsay qualified for the final, but Forrester missed out by a fraction of a second after coming ninth.

Ramsay qualified for the 200m individual medley final but was a late withdrawal due to COVID-19.
