= Riley Watson =

English medical doctor and public health official

Personal information
- Full name: Joseph Riley Watson
- Born: 28 March 1859; Steeton, Yorkshire, England
- Died: 18 October 1915 (aged 56); Harrogate, Yorkshire, England
- Batting: Unknown
- Bowling: Unknown

Domestic team information
- Years: Team
- 1882: Cambridge University

Career statistics
Competition	First-class
Matches	2
Runs scored	2
Batting average	0.66
100s/50s	–/–
Top score	1
Balls bowled	32
Wickets	0
Bowling average	–
5 wickets in innings	–
10 wickets in match	–
Best bowling	–
Catches/stumpings	1/–
- Source: Cricinfo, 25 January 2023

Joseph Riley Watson (28 March 1859 – 18 October 1915) was an English medical doctor and public health official who was also in his youth a cricketer who played first-class cricket in two matches in the 1880s. He was born at Steeton-in-Craven, Yorkshire and died at Harrogate, also in Yorkshire.

Watson was educated at Pannal College, Harrogate and then at a succession of medical training establishments and universities: The Yorkshire College of Science (later Leeds University); University College London; Christ's College, Cambridge; and then the University of Edinburgh. He graduated from Cambridge University with a Bachelor of Arts degree in 1884 and followed that with a medical degree from Edinburgh in 1887. He was a Doctor of Public Health from 1894 and a member of the Royal College of Physicians. He practised in Harrogate where he later became the medical officer of health for the borough of Harrogate.

As a cricketer, Watson played in one first-class match for Cambridge University against the Australians in 1882, in which he batted at No 11 and bowled just eight overs without success; in 1888 he played a further single game for "An England XI", an end-of-season match against that year's Australians at Harrogate, and did not bowl at all. He scored a single run in each of his two games.
