= Jenna Forrester =

Australian swimmer (born 2003)

Personal information
- Nationality: Australian
- Born: 14 June 2003 (age 23) Sandton, Gauteng, South Africa

Sport
- Sport: Swimming
- Strokes: Backstroke, medley
Medal record
Representing Australia
World Championships (LC)
Silver medal – second place	2025 Singapore	400 m medley
Bronze medal – third place	2023 Fukuoka	400 m medley
Commonwealth Games
Gold medal – first place	2026 Glasgow	200 m backstroke
Gold medal – first place	2026 Glasgow	200 m medley
Gold medal – first place	2026 Glasgow	400 m medley
Bronze medal – third place	2026 Glasgow	400 m freestyle
Pan Pacific Championships
Silver medal – second place	2026 Irvine	400 m medley
World Junior Championships
Silver medal – second place	2019 Budapest	4×200 m freestyle

Jenna Forrester (born 14 June 2003) is an Australian swimmer. She won a bronze medal in the 400 metre individual medley at the 2023 World Aquatics Championships.

== Career ==
Forrester swims for St. Peter's Western Swim Club in Brisbane. In 2017, she was part of the 4 x 200-metre freestyle relay at the Junior World Championships, which was disqualified in the preliminary round. Two years later, she won the silver medal with the relay behind the US quartet. Forrester won the 400 m individual medley at the 2021 Australian Trials but did not meet the qualifying time and was therefore not selected for the Olympic team.

At the 2022 World Championships in Budapest, Forrester reached the final of the 400-metre individual medley and finished seventh. A month later at the Commonwealth Games in Birmingham, Forrester finished sixth in the 400-meter individual medley, with her compatriot Kiah Melverton winning the silver medal.

The following year, Forrester competed in three distances at the 2023 World Championships in Fukuoka. She finished fourth in the 200-meter individual medley, 0.24 seconds behind third-placed Chinese Yu Yiting. In the 200-meter backstroke, Forrester finished eighth. In the 400-meter individual medley, Canadian Summer McIntosh won ahead of Katie Grimes from the United States, 0.89 seconds behind Grimes, Forrester won the bronze medal and was over two seconds ahead of fourth-placed Alex Walsh.

Forrester was in the Australian swimming team at the 2024 Paris Olympics. She and Ella Ramsay were both in the 400m individual medley for Australia. Ramsay qualified for the final but Forrester missed out by a fraction of a second after coming ninth.

At the 2025 World Championships, Forrester recorded a time of 4:33.26 in the 400 m individual medley, dead-heating with Mio Narita for the silver medal.
