= Swimming at the 2026 Commonwealth Games =

- Swimming and para-swimming pictogram
- Venue: Tollcross International Swimming Centre
- Dates: 24 July – 29 July 2026
- Competitors: 471 from 61 nations

Swimming at the 2026 Commonwealth Games was the 23rd appearance of Swimming at the Commonwealth Games. The swimming competition was among the sports contested at the 2026 Commonwealth Games, to be held in Glasgow, Scotland. The sport, one of only two mandatory sports at a Games along with athletics had been staged in all twenty-two previous editions of the Games thus far and was contested in Glasgow for the second time, and Scotland for the fourth time.

The competition took place between 24 and 29 July 2026, spread across a record fifty-six events (including a record fourteen parasport events). The swimming portion of the Games ended two days before the beginning of the 2026 European Aquatics Championships.

Traditional swimming power Australia dominated the meet, winning a record 37 gold medals and 76 medals in total, including all eight relay events, and every able-bodied freestyle event, male and female Chad le Clos of South Africa became the most decorated athlete in Commonwealth Games history, the men's mixed medley relay on the final night allowing him to overtake previous record holder Emma McKeon. His compatriot, backstroker Pieter Coetze won three gold medals in his specialist stroke. Meg Harris of Australia took home six gold medals, including four in the relays, while Sam Short and Lani Pallister achieved distance trebles in the 400, 800 and 1500 metre freestyle events..

Other notable successes included Filip Nowacki winning Jersey's first gold medal in swimming, Angharad Evans winning a breaststroke double before her home crowd, and a double gold for New Zealander Lewis Clarebert. By contrast, England had a poor meet, failing to win a single gold in able-bodied events for the first time since 1954, but tempering the disappointment with a much stronger performance in para swimming, with four golds.

== Schedule ==
The competition schedule is as follows:

H	Heats	½	Semi-finals	F	Final

Men
Date Event	Fri 24		Sat 25		Sun 26		Mon 27		Tue 28		Wed 29	
Session →	M	E	M	E	M	E	M	E	M	E	M	E
50 m freestyle			H	½		F						
50 m freestyle S7											H	F
50 m freestyle S13									H	F		
100 m freestyle							H	½		F		
100 m freestyle S13	H	F										
200 m freestyle											H	F
200 m freestyle S14			H	F								
400 m freestyle			H	F								
800 m freestyle							H	F				
1500 m freestyle											H	F
50 m backstroke	H	½		F								
100 m backstroke									H	½		F
100 m backstroke S9					H	F						
200 m backstroke					H	F						
50 m breaststroke					H	½		F				
100 m breaststroke	H	½		F								
100 m breaststroke SB9							H	F				
200 m breaststroke									H	F		
50 m butterfly									H	½		F
100 m butterfly			H	½		F						
100 m butterfly S10	H	F										
200 m butterfly							H	F				
200 m individual medley	H	F										
400 m individual medley									H	F		
4×100 m freestyle relay	H	F										
4×200 m freestyle relay					H	F						
4×100 m medley relay											H	F

Women
Date Event	Fri 24		Sat 25		Sun 26		Mon 27		Tue 28		Wed 29	
Session →	M	E	M	E	M	E	M	E	M	E	M	E
50 m freestyle									H	½		F
50 m freestyle S13									H	F		
100 m freestyle					H	½		F				
100 m freestyle S9											H	F
100 m freestyle S13	H	F										
200 m freestyle			H	F								
200 m freestyle S14			H	F								
400 m freestyle	H	F										
800 m freestyle									H	F		
1500 m freestyle					H	F						
50 m backstroke							H	½		F		
100 m backstroke			H	½		F						
100 m backstroke S9					H	F						
200 m backstroke	H	F										
50 m breaststroke							H	½		F		
100 m breaststroke			H	½		F						
100 m breaststroke SB8							H	F				
200 m breaststroke											H	F
50 m butterfly	H	½		F								
100 m butterfly					H	½		F				
200 m butterfly											H	F
200 m individual medley									H	F		
200 m individual medley SM10	H	F										
400 m individual medley							H	F				
4×100 m freestyle relay	H	F										
4×200 m freestyle relay								F				
4×100 m medley relay											H	F

Mixed
Date Event	Sat 25		Tue 28	
Session →	M	E	M	E
4×100 m freestyle relay	H	F		
4×100 m medley relay			H	F

== Venue ==
The swimming competitions will be held at the Tollcross International Swimming Centre, which also hosted the swimming events in Games of 2014.

== Medal summary ==
=== Medal table ===
* Host nation (Scotland)

Rank	CGA	Gold	Silver	Bronze	Total
1	Australia	37	16	23	76
2	South Africa	6	8	8	22
3	Scotland*	5	5	2	12
4	England	4	12	10	26
5	New Zealand	2	5	3	10
6	Canada	2	2	5	9
7	Jersey	1	1	0	2
8	Wales	0	3	3	6
9	Northern Ireland	0	2	2	4
10	Singapore	0	1	0	1
10	Uganda	0	1	0	1
Totals (11 entries)		57	56	56	169

=== Medalists ===
==== Men ====
Event	Gold		Silver		Bronze	
50 metre freestyle	Cameron McEvoy; Australia	20.97; GR	Flynn Southam; Australia	21.44	Jamie Jack; Australia	21.47
100 metre freestyle	Flynn Southam; Australia	47.13	Matt Richards; Wales	47.64	Kyle Chalmers; Australia	47.74
200 metre freestyle	Kai Taylor; Australia	1:45.22	James Guy; England Matt Richards; Wales	1:45.72	not awarded	
400 metre freestyle	Sam Short; Australia	3:41.25	Elijah Winnington; Australia	3:45.56	Ben Goedemans; Australia	3:45.57
800 metre freestyle	Sam Short; Australia	7:39.81; GR	Ben Goedemans; Australia	7:46.49	Matthew Galea; Australia	7:47.10
1500 metre freestyle	Sam Short; Australia	14:42.11	Daniel Wiffen; Northern Ireland	14:44.70	Ben Goedemans; Australia	14:49.50
50 metre backstroke	Pieter Coetze; South Africa	24.18; GR	Oliver Morgan; England	24.48	Ruard van Renen; South Africa	24.51
100 metre backstroke	Pieter Coetze; South Africa	51.77; CR, AF	Oliver Morgan; England	52.66	Ruard van Renen; South Africa	53.31
200 metre backstroke	Pieter Coetze; South Africa	1:54.22; GR	Oliver Morgan; England	1:56.44	Luke Greenbank; England	1:56.58
50 metre breaststroke	Sam Williamson; Australia	26.50	Michael Houlie; South Africa	26.77	Adam Ramsay-Peaty; England	26.94
100 metre breaststroke	Sam Williamson; Australia	59.17	Filip Nowacki; Jersey	59.34	Adam Ramsay-Peaty; England	59.65
200 metre breaststroke	Filip Nowacki; Jersey	2:07.87	Oliver Dawson; Canada	2:08.39; NR	Zac Stubblety-Cook; Australia	2:08.91
50 metre butterfly	Kyle Chalmers; Australia Ben Armbruster; Australia	22.73; GR, =OC	not awarded		Cameron McEvoy; Australia	22.92
100 metre butterfly	Joshua Liendo; Canada	50.42; GR	Matthew Temple; Australia	50.43	Ben Armbruster; Australia	50.58
200 metre butterfly	Lewis Clareburt; New Zealand	1:55.05	Harrison Turner; Australia	1:55.38	Matthew Temple; Australia	1:55.45
200 metre individual medley	Duncan Scott; Scotland	1:56.38; GR	Lewis Clareburt; New Zealand	1:56.77; NR	Tom Dean; England	1:57.22
400 metre individual medley	Lewis Clareburt; New Zealand	4:08.72	William Petric; Australia	4:11.02	Lorne Wigginton; Canada	4:11.38
4 × 100 metre freestyle relay	Australia; Flynn Southam (47.09) GR; Kai Taylor (47.53); Harrison Turner (47.94); Kyle Chalmers (46.93); Edward Sommerville^{[a]} Matthew Temple^{[a]} William Petric^{[a]} Jamie Jack^{[a]}	3:09.49; GR	England; Jacob Mills (48.02); James Guy (48.24); Gabriel Shepherd (47.73); Jacob Whittle (47.70); Edward Mildred^{[a]} Cameron Brooker^{[a]} Oliver Morgan^{[a]} Tom Dean^{[a]}	3:11.69	South Africa; Pieter Coetze (48.38); Guy Brooks (48.98); Ruard van Renen (48.34); Chad le Clos (48.29); Kris Mihaylov^{[a]}	3:13.99
4 × 200 metre freestyle relay	Australia; Samuel Short (1:46.08); Harrison Turner (1:45.95); Edward Sommerville (1:45.34); Kai Taylor (1:44.10); William Petric^{[a]} Brendon Smith^{[a]} Elijah Winnington^{[a]}	7:01.47; GR	England; Gabriel Shepherd (1:46.67); Thomas Dean (1:45.63); James Guy (1:44.03); Max Litchfield (1:48.65); Cameron Brooker^{[a]} Jacob Whittle^{[a]} Jacob Mills^{[a]}	7:04.98	Wales; Matt Richards (1:45.42); Dan Jones (1:49.13); Kieran Bird (1:47.54); Tyler Melbourne-Smith (1:47.50); Harry Milne^{[a]} Jack Knight^{[a]} Lewis Fraser^{[a]}	7:09.59
4 × 100 metre medley relay	Australia; Henry Allan (53.58); Samuel Williamson (58.40); Matthew Temple (50.18); Flynn Southam (46.55); Isaac Cooper^{[a]} Zac Stubblety-Cook^{[a]} Ben Armbruster^{[a]} Jamie Jack^{[a]}	3:28.71; GR	England; Oliver Morgan (53.20); Adam Ramsay-Peaty (58.74); Edward Mildred (51.04); Jacob Mills (47.70); Luke Greenbank^{[a]} Gregory Butler^{[a]} Jacob Peters^{[a]} Jacob Whittle^{[a]}	3:30.68	South Africa; Pieter Coetze (51.71) CR, AF; Michael Houlie (59.41); Chad le Clos (51.27); Ruard van Renen (48.74); Chris Smith^{[a]} Jarden Eaton^{[a]} Guy Brooks^{[a]}	3:31.13 AF

==== Men's parasport ====
Event	Gold		Silver		Bronze	
50 metre freestyle S7	Christian Sadie; South Africa	28.06; GR	Toh Wei Soong; Singapore	29.36	Bruce Dee; England	31.33
50 metre freestyle S13	Stephen Clegg; Scotland	24.73	Nathan Hendricks; South Africa	24.84	Nicolas-Guy Turbide; Canada	24.96
100 metre freestyle S13	Nathan Hendricks; South Africa	54.54	James Clegg; Scotland	55.16	Matthew Redfern; England	56.86
100 metre backstroke S9	Timothy Hodge; Australia	1:03.00	Barry McClements; Northern Ireland	1:03.68	Harrison Vig; Australia	1:04.87
100 metre breaststroke SB9	Beau Matthews; Australia	1:09.41	Joshua Willmer; New Zealand	1:11.44	Timothy Hodge; Australia	1:12.74
100 metre butterfly S10	Alex Saffy; Australia	57.11	Col Pearse; Australia	57.49	Jack Gill; Canada	1:00.30
200 metre freestyle S14	William Ellard; England	1:51.66; GR	Jack Ireland; Australia	1:55.22	Rhys Darbey; Wales	1:56.24

==== Women ====
Event	Gold		Silver		Bronze	
50 metre freestyle	Meg Harris; Australia	24.23	Alex Perkins; Australia	24.53	Shayna Jack; Australia	24.57
100 metre freestyle	Meg Harris; Australia	52.90	Mollie O'Callaghan; Australia	53.25	Shayna Jack; Australia	53.38
200 metre freestyle	Mollie O'Callaghan; Australia	1:54.66	Lani Pallister; Australia	1:55.01	Erika Fairweather; New Zealand	1:55.24
400 metre freestyle	Lani Pallister; Australia	3:59.56	Erika Fairweather; New Zealand	4:02.65	Jenna Forrester; Australia	4:05.25
800 metre freestyle	Lani Pallister; Australia	8:11.12; GR	Erika Fairweather; New Zealand	8:24.97	Molly Walker; Australia	8:25.93
1500 metre freestyle	Lani Pallister; Australia	15:41.03; GR	Erika Fairweather; New Zealand	15:58.97	Molly Walker; Australia	16:01.37
50 metre backstroke	Kylie Masse; Canada	27.32	Iona Anderson; Australia	27.45	Lauren Cox; England	27.56
100 metre backstroke	Iona Anderson; Australia	58.71	Kylie Masse; Canada	58.77	Olivia Nel; South Africa	1:00.09; NR
200 metre backstroke	Jenna Forrester; Australia	2:08.17	Katie Shanahan; Scotland	2:08.54	Hannah Fredericks; Australia	2:09.02
50 metre breaststroke	Lara van Niekerk; South Africa	30.43	Sienna Toohey; Australia	30.54	Imogen Clark; England Sophie Angus; Canada	30.86
100 metre breaststroke	Angharad Evans; Scotland	1:06.07	Aimee Canny; South Africa	1:06.19	Sienna Toohey; Australia	1:06.47
200 metre breaststroke	Angharad Evans; Scotland	2:23.79	Kaylene Corbett; South Africa	2:24.46	Ellie McCartney; Northern Ireland	2:24.73
50 metre butterfly	Alexandria Perkins; Australia	25.37	Erin Gallagher; South Africa	25.57	Hazel Ouwehand; New Zealand	25.76
100 metre butterfly	Alexandria Perkins; Australia	56.38	Keanna Macinnes; Scotland	57.33	Erin Gallagher; South Africa	57.39
200 metre butterfly	Brittany Castelluzzo; Australia	2:06.56	Keanna Macinnes; Scotland	2:06.76	Elizabeth Dekkers; Australia	2:06.91
200 metre individual medley	Jenna Forrester; Australia	2:09.24	Aimee Canny; South Africa	2:09.37; NR	Amalie Smith; England	2:09.61
400 metre individual medley	Jenna Forrester; Australia	4:31.19	Amalie Smith; England	4:33.70	Ella Ramsay; Australia	4:37.12
4 × 100 metre freestyle relay	Australia; Meg Harris (53.07); Shayna Jack (52.64); Alexandria Perkins (52.88); Mollie O'Callaghan (52.81); Hannah Casey^{[a]} Brittany Castelluzzo^{[a]} Inez Miller^{[a]} Jessica Cole^{[a]}	3:31.40	England; Eva Okaro (54.50); Freya Colbert (53.41); Leah Schlosshan (53.97); Freya Anderson (53.78); Abbie Wood^{[a]} Erin Little^{[a]} Darcy Revitt^{[a]} Amalie Smith^{[a]}	3:35.66	South Africa; Aimee Canny (54.40); Rebecca Meder (54.46); Erin Gallagher (55.52); Olivia Nel (54.29); Georgia Nel^{[a]} Jessica Thompson^{[a]} Caitlin de Lange^{[a]}	3:38.67; AF
4 × 200 metre freestyle relay	Australia; Lani Pallister (1:55.13); Hannah Casey (1:55.43); Inez Miller (1:55.78); Mollie O'Callaghan (1:56.19)	7:42.53	England; Freya Colbert (1:55.98); Abbie Wood (1:58.15); Leah Schlosshan (1:58.22); Freya Anderson (1:57.75)	7:50.10	New Zealand; Erika Fairweather (1:55.92); Caitlin Deans (1:58.12); Eve Thomas (1:59.57); Milana Tapper (1:58.33)	7:51.94
4 × 100 metre medley relay	Australia; Iona Anderson (58.83); Sienna Toohey (1:06.75); Alexandria Perkins (56.30); Meg Harris (52.37); Hannah Fredericks^{[a]} Brittany Castelluzzo^{[a]} Mollie O'Callaghan^{[a]}	3:54.25	Scotland; Katie Shanahan (1:00.66); Angharad Evans (1:04.83); Keanna Macinnes (57.67); Evie Davis (53.86); Holly McGill^{[a]} Anna Morgan^{[a]} Ciara Schlosshan^{[a]} Emma Wood^{[a]}	3:57.02	South Africa; Olivia Nel (1:00.38); Aimee Canny (1:06.37); Erin Gallagher (57.04); Rebecca Meder (54.79); Jessica Thompson^{[a]} Lara van Niekerk^{[a]} Georgia Nel^{[a]}	3:58.58

==== Women's parasport ====
Event	Gold		Silver		Bronze	
50 metre freestyle S13	Kirralee Hayes; Australia	27.63	Danika Vyncka; South Africa	28.41	Jenna Jones; Australia	29.02
100 metre freestyle S9	Lakeisha Patterson; Australia	1:02.99	Emily Beecroft; Australia	1:03.56	Toni Shaw; Scotland	1:04.71
100 metre freestyle S13	Jenna Jones; Australia	1:03.89	Ela Letton-Jones; Wales	1:04.30	Kirralee Hayes; Australia	1:04.42
200 metre freestyle S14	Georgia Sheffield; England	2:06.07; GR	Poppy Maskill; England	2:07.44	Bethany Firth; Northern Ireland	2:07.63
100 metre backstroke S9	Alice Tai; England	1:11.93; GR	Gemma Sellick; Australia	1:14.06	Victoria Belando Nicholson; Australia	1:15.11
100 metre breaststroke SB8	Brock Whiston; England	1:22.05	Husnah Kukundakwe; Uganda	1:26.20	Iona Winnifrith; England	1:26.31
200 metre individual medley SM10	Faye Rogers; Scotland	2:29.61	Jasmine Greenwood; Australia	2:32.13	Mary Jibb; Canada	2:32.54

==== Mixed ====
Event	Gold		Silver		Bronze	
4 × 100 metre freestyle relay	Australia; Flynn Southam (47.29); Kyle Chalmers (47.62); Shayna Jack (52.42); Meg Harris (52.03); Kai Taylor^{[a]} Harrison Turner^{[a]} Hannah Casey^{[a]} Alexandria Perkins^{[a]}	3:19.36; GR	England; Jacob Mills (48.22); Jacob Whittle (48.25); Freya Anderson (53.98); Freya Colbert (53.46); Gabriel Shephard^{[a]} Tom Dean^{[a]} Abbie Wood^{[a]} Erin Little^{[a]}	3:23.91	Wales; Matt Richards (47.62); Dan Jones (49.17); Bex Sutton (54.91); Theodora Taylor (52.63); Harry Milne^{[a]} Kieran Bird^{[a]} Medi Harris^{[a]} Meghan Higgs^{[a]}	3:24.33
4 × 100 metre medley relay	Australia; Iona Anderson (59.44); Sam Williamson (58.81); Matthew Temple (50.05); Meg Harris (52.16); Brittany Castelluzzo^{[a]} Hannah Fredericks^{[a]} Harrison Turner^{[a]}	3:40.46; GR	South Africa; Pieter Coetze (51.98) GR; Michael Houlie (59.65); Erin Gallagher (57.40); Aimee Canny (53.58); Chad le Clos^{[a]} Georgia Nel^{[a]} Hannah Pearse^{[a]} Chris Smith^{[a]}	3:42.61	Scotland; Matthew Ward (53.55); Angharad Evans (1:04.52); Keanna Macinnes (57.60); Duncan Scott (48.03); Dean Fearn^{[a]} Lucy Grieve^{[a]} Joshua Mitchell^{[a]} Emma Wood^{[a]}	3:43.70

^{a} Swimmers who participated in the heats only and received medals.

== Participating nations ==
The qualification criteria for swimming and para-swimming at the 2026 Games are separate. Swimming qualification is subject to quota caps, with each nation allocated a certain number of overall athlete quotas for the Games, from which it can then allocate a fixed number for the swimming events. Para-swimming spots, by comparison, are allocated on a rankings basis with no fixed cap.

Swimming

- Anguilla (3)
- Antigua and Barbuda (4)
- Australia (42)
- Bahamas (6)
- Bangladesh (4)
- Barbados (7)
- Belize (1)
- Bermuda (5)
- Botswana (2)
- Brunei (3)
- Canada (12)
- Cayman Islands (10)
- Cook Islands (4)
- Cyprus (6)
- Dominica (1)
- England (28)
- Eswatini (2)
- Fiji (7)
- Gabon (1)
- The Gambia (2)
- Ghana (4)
- Gibraltar (7)
- Grenada (2)
- Guernsey (12)
- Guyana (3)
- India (5)
- Isle of Man (11)
- Jamaica (4)
- Jersey (9)
- Kenya (4)
- Malawi (3)
- Malaysia (4)
- Maldives (5)
- Malta (2)
- Mauritius (5)
- Mozambique (2)
- Namibia (5)
- New Zealand (10)
- Nigeria (4)
- Northern Ireland (13)
- Pakistan (4)
- Papua New Guinea (5)
- Rwanda (3)
- Saint Helena (3)
- Saint Kitts and Nevis (2)
- Saint Vincent and the Grenadines (3)
- Samoa (4)
- Scotland (25)
- Seychelles (7)
- Sierra Leone (5)
- Singapore (8)
- Solomon Islands (2)
- South Africa (21)
- Sri Lanka (2)
- Tanzania (1)
- Tonga (2)
- Turks and Caicos Islands (2)
- Uganda (7)
- Vanuatu (3)
- Wales (16)
- Zambia (4)

Para-swimming

- Australia (18)
- Barbados (1)
- Canada (12)
- England (15)
- Ghana (1)
- India (5)
- Malaysia (3)
- New Zealand (1)
- Northern Ireland (2)
- Scotland (7)
- Singapore (2)
- South Africa (4)
- Uganda (2)
- Wales (5)
