= New Zealand at the 2026 Commonwealth Games =

- CG code: NZL
- CGA: New Zealand Olympic Committee
- Website: www.olympic.org.nz

in Glasgow, Scotland 23 July 2026 – 2 August 2026
- Competitors: 112 in 10 sports
- Flag bearer (opening): David Liti
- Baton bearer: Moira de Villiers
- Flag bearer (closing): Eliza McCartney
- Medals Ranked 6th: Gold 10 Silver 14 Bronze 12 Total 36

Commonwealth Games appearances (overview)
- 1930; 1934; 1938; 1950; 1954; 1958; 1962; 1966; 1970; 1974; 1978; 1982; 1986; 1990; 1994; 1998; 2002; 2006; 2010; 2014; 2018; 2022; 2026; 2030

New Zealand competed at the 2026 Commonwealth Games in Glasgow, Scotland, from 23 July to 2 August 2026. Selection of the team was the responsibility of the New Zealand Olympic Committee (NZOC). It was New Zealand's 23rd appearance at the Commonwealth Games, having competed at every Games since their inception in 1930.

The New Zealand team consisted of 112 athletes, and finished sixth on the medal table, winning a total of 36 medals, 10 of which were gold.

Weightlifter David Liti was the flagbearer, and judoka Moira de Villiers the baton bearer, for the opening ceremony. The flagbearer at the closing ceremony was Eliza McCartney.

== Medallists ==
Unless otherwise stated, all dates and times are in British Summer Time (UTC+1), 11 hours behind New Zealand Standard Time (UTC+12).

Medal	Name	Sport	Event	Date
Gold	Lewis Clareburt	Swimming	Men's 200 m butterfly	27 July
Gold	Lewis Clareburt	Swimming	Men's 400 m individual medley	28 July
Gold	Zoe Hobbs	Athletics	Women's 100 metres	28 July
Gold	Emma Foy; Jessie Hodges	Track cycling	Women's tandem sprint B	30 July
Gold	David Liti	Weightlifting	Men's +110 kg	30 July
Gold	Devon Briggs	Track cycling	Men's 1 km time trial C1-3	31 July
Gold	Eliza McCartney	Athletics	Women's pole vault	31 July
Gold	Emma Foy; Jessie Hodges	Track cycling	Women's tandem 1 km time trial B	1 August
Gold	New Zealand netball team: Karin Burger (c); Maddy Gordon; Catherine Hall; Georgia Heffernan; Kate Heffernan (vc); Kelly Jackson; Grace Nweke; Kimiora Poi; Mila Reuelu-Buchanan; Martina Salmon; Carys Stythe; Amelia Walmsley	Netball	Women's tournament	2 August
Gold	Sydnee Andrews	Judo	Women's +78 kg	2 August
Silver	Erika Fairweather	Swimming	Women's 400 metre freestyle	24 July
Silver	Lewis Clareburt	Swimming	Men's 200 metre individual medley	24 July
Silver	Erika Fairweather	Swimming	Women's 1500 metre freestyle	26 July
Silver	Joshua Willmer	Swimming	Men's 100 m breaststroke SB9	27 July
Silver	Cameron McTaggart	Weightlifting	Men's 88 kg	28 July
Silver	Erika Fairweather	Swimming	Women's 800 metre freestyle	28 July
Silver	Lauren Bruce	Athletics	Women's hammer throw	28 July
Silver	Bryony Botha; Samantha Donnelly; Prudence Fowler; Emily Shearman; Ally Wollaston	Track cycling	Women's team pursuit	30 July
Silver	Tom Walsh	Athletics	Men's shot put	30 July
Silver	Samantha Donnelly	Track cycling	Women's scratch race	31 July
Silver	Tori Moorby	Athletics	Women's javelin throw	1 August
Silver	Teri Blackbourn; Julie O'Connell	Bowls	Women's pairs B6–8	2 August
Silver	Mark Noble; Kurt Smith	Bowls	Men's pairs B6–8	2 August
Silver	Ellesse Andrews	Track cycling	Women's keirin	2 August
Bronze	Erika Fairweather	Swimming	Women's 200 metre freestyle	25 July
Bronze	Hazel Ouwehand	Swimming	Women's 50 metre butterfly	25 July
Bronze	Caitlin Deans; Erika Fairweather; Milana Tapper; Eve Thomas	Swimming	Women's 4 × 200 m freestyle	27 July
Bronze	Azure Anderson; Ella Fotu; Eva Langton; Sharne Pupuke-Robati	3x3 basketball	Women's tournament	29 July
Bronze	Nicole Murray	Track cycling	Women's individual pursuit C4-5	30 July
Bronze	Marshall Erwood; Keegan Hornblow; George Jackson; Daniel Morton; Tom Sexton	Track cycling	Men's team pursuit	30 July
Bronze	Anna Grimaldi	Athletics	Women's 100 metres (T47)	30 July
Bronze	Imogen Ayris	Athletics	Women's pole vault	31 July
Bronze	Ellesse Andrews	Track cycling	Women's time trial	1 August
Bronze	Kody Andrews	Judo	Men's +100 kg	2 August
Bronze	Devon Briggs	Track cycling	Men's individual pursuit C1-3	2 August
Bronze	George Jackson	Track cycling	Men's points race	2 August

Medals by sport
Sport	1st place, gold medalist(s)	2nd place, silver medalist(s)	3rd place, bronze medalist(s)	Total
Track cycling	3	4	5	12
Swimming	2	5	3	10
Athletics	2	2	2	6
Weightlifting	1	1	0	2
Judo	1	0	1	2
Netball	1	0	0	1
Bowls	0	2	0	2
3x3 basketball	0	0	1	1
Total	10	14	12	36

Medals by date
Day	Date	1st place, gold medalist(s)	2nd place, silver medalist(s)	3rd place, bronze medalist(s)	Total
1	24 July	0	2	0	2
2	25 July	0	0	2	2
3	26 July	0	1	0	1
4	27 July	1	1	1	3
5	28 July	2	3	0	5
6	29 July	0	0	1	1
7	30 July	2	2	3	7
8	31 July	2	1	1	4
9	1 August	1	1	1	3
10	2 August	2	3	3	8
Total		10	14	12	36

Medals by gender
Gender	1st place, gold medalist(s)	2nd place, silver medalist(s)	3rd place, bronze medalist(s)	Total
Male	4	5	4	13
Female	6	9	8	23
Mixed / open	0	0	0	0
Total	10	14	12	36

== Competitors ==
The following is the list of number of competitors participating at the Games per sport/discipline.

Sport	Men	Women	Total
Artistic gymnastics	4	3	7
Athletics	10	9	19
3x3 basketball	4	4	8
Bowls	6	6	12
Boxing	4	3	7
Judo	5	3	8
Netball	—N/a	12	12
Swimming	4	9	13
Track cycling	8	11	19
Weightlifting	3	4	7
Total	48	64	112

== Artistic gymnastics ==
A squad of seven gymnasts (four men, three women) was named on 10 June 2026.

Men's
Team final and individual qualification

Athlete	Event	Apparatus						Total	Rank
Athlete	Event	F	PH	R	V	PB	HB	Total	Rank
William Fu-Allen	Team	13.050	DNS				—N/a		
Alex Istok	Team	DNS	9.800	DNS		11.600	13.200 Q	DNF	—N/a
Mikhail Koudinov	Team	DNS		—N/a		11.000	9.200	—N/a	
Daniel Stoddart	Team	12.200	10.850	12.800 Q	13.300	11.200	12.500	72.850	13 Q
Total		25.250	20.650	12.800	13.300	33.800	34.900	140.700	10

Individual finals

Athlete	Event	Apparatus						Total	Rank
Athlete	Event	F	PH	R	V	PB	HB	Total	Rank
Daniel Stoddart	Men's individual all-around	12.850	10.450	12.550	12.650	12.200	12.850	73.550	12

Apparatus finals

Athlete	Event	Total	Rank
Alex Istok	Men's horizontal bar	8.200	8
Daniel Stoddart	Men's rings	12.866	7

Women's
Team final and individual qualification

Athlete	Event	Apparatus				Total	Rank
Athlete	Event	V	UB	BB	F	Total	Rank
Jun McDonald	Team	—N/a	12.450	—N/a			
Courtney McGregor	Team	12.950 Q	11.700	11.500	11.150	47.300	15 Q
Sienna Shields	Team	12.250	—N/a	9.300	11.250	—N/a	
Total		25.200	24.150	20.800	22.400	92.550	12

Individual finals

Athlete	Event	Apparatus				Total	Rank
Athlete	Event	V	UB	BB	F	Total	Rank
Courtney McGregor	Women's individual all-around	13.350	10.800	11.650	11.350	47.150	15

Apparatus finals

Athlete	Event	Total	Rank
Courtney McGregor	Women's vault	13.183	5

== Athletics ==
The first member of the athletics team was announced by the NZOC on 30 April 2026, with a further 20 athletes named on 15 June 2026. Jacko Gill, silver medallist in the shot put at the previous Games, withdrew from the team on 21 July after picking up an injury in the warmup for a meeting in Madrid on 16 July. Defending high jump champion Hamish Kerr, withdrew the day before his event.

Key

Ranks given for track events are within the athlete's heat only.

- Q = Qualified for the next round
- q = Qualified for the next round as a fastest loser or, in field events, by position without achieving the qualifying target

Track

Athlete	Event	Heat		Semifinal		Final	
Athlete	Event	Result	Rank	Result	Rank	Result	Rank
Geordie Beamish	Men's mile	DNS					
Geordie Beamish	Men's 3000 m steeplechase	—N/a				8:24.09	4
Anna Grimaldi	Women's 100 m (T45–47)	—N/a				12.46	3rd place, bronze medalist(s)
Zoe Hobbs	Women's 100 m	Bye		11.04	2 Q	10.93	1st place, gold medalist(s)
James Preston	Men's 800 m	1:48.43	4 q	1:48.84	8	did not advance	
Sam Tanner	Men's mile	3:59.31	3 Q	—N/a		3:56.63	9

Field

Athlete	Event	Qualification		Final	
Athlete	Event	Result	Rank	Result	Rank
Imogen Ayris	Women's pole vault	—N/a		4.55	3rd place, bronze medalist(s)
Anthony Barmes	Men's hammer throw	—N/a		67.49	6
Lauren Bruce	Women's hammer throw	67.70	2 q	69.82	2nd place, silver medalist(s)
Eliza McCartney	Women's pole vault	—N/a		4.65	1st place, gold medalist(s)
Olivia McTaggart	Women's pole vault	—N/a		4.30	4
Tori Moorby	Women's javelin throw	—N/a		60.04	2nd place, silver medalist(s)
Ethan Olivier	Men's triple jump	16.11	5 q	16.50	4
Nick Palmer	Men's shot put	19.92	6 q	20.27	6
Nick Southgate	Men's pole vault	—N/a		5.10	7
James Steyn	Men's pole vault	—N/a		5.10	8
Tom Walsh	Men's shot put	21.03	1 Q	21.03	2nd place, silver medalist(s)

Combined
Men's decathlon

Athlete	Event	100 m	LJ	SP	HJ	400 m	110H	DT	PV	JT	1500 m	Final	Rank
Max Attwell	Result	11.09	7.15	12.84	1.88	50.21	16.19	39.47	4.50	46.99	4:28.50	7272	9
Max Attwell	Points	841	850	657	696	805	711	654	760	544	754	7272	9

Women's heptathlon

Athlete	Event	100H	HJ	SP	200 m	LJ	JT	800 m	Final	Rank
Briana Stephenson	Result	13.67	1.73	11.96	24.71	6.04	35.19	2:13.27	5843	9
Briana Stephenson	Points	1026	891	658	914	862	575	917	5843	9
Maddie Wilson	Result	14.28	1.82	12.10	25.35	6.23	40.37	2:11.34	6005	5
Maddie Wilson	Points	939	1003	668	855	921	674	945	6005	5

== 3x3 basketball ==
New Zealand's men's and women's 3x3 basketball teams have qualified for Glasgow 2026. The two four-person squads were announced on 19 June 2026.

Summary

Team	Event	Group stage						Quarterfinal	Semifinal	Final / BM / CM	
Team	Event	Opposition Score	Opposition Score	Opposition Score	Opposition Score	Opposition Score	Rank	Opposition Score	Opposition Score	Opposition Score	Rank
New Zealand men	Men's tournament	Australia; L 15–21	Guyana; W 21–3	Nigeria; W 21–10	Cayman Islands; W 21–9	Scotland; W 21–13	2 q	Singapore; W 21–15	England; L 16–21	Scotland; L 16–18	4
New Zealand women	Women's tournament	Papua New Guinea; W 22–6	Tonga; W 21–8	England; W 21–12	Scotland; W 21–12	Singapore; W 22–16	1 Q	—N/a	Uganda; L 9–21	Jamaica; W 18–13	3rd place, bronze medalist(s)

=== Men's tournament ===
Roster

- Josh Book
- Te Tuhi Lewis
- Christian Martin
- Aidan Tonge

Group A

Pos	Team	Pld	W	L	PF	PA	PD	Qualification
1	Australia	5	5	0	105	60	+45	Direct to semi-finals
2	New Zealand	5	4	1	99	56	+43	Quarter-finals
3	Scotland (H)	5	3	2	90	85	+5	Quarter-finals
4	Nigeria	5	2	3	82	99	−17	
5	Guyana	5	1	4	68	100	−32	
6	Cayman Islands	5	0	5	61	105	−44	

Source: Glasgow 2026
Rules for classification: 1) Wins; 2) Head-to-head record; 3) Points scored.
(H) Hosts

24 July 2026
10:00

Report

New Zealand	15–21	Australia
Pts: Book 6		Pts: Antonio, McDaniel 8

SEC, Glasgow

24 July 2026
14:55

Report

New Zealand	21–3	Guyana
Pts: Book 10		Pts: Hinckson 2

SEC, Glasgow

24 July 2026
19:00

Report

New Zealand	21–10	Nigeria
Pts: Lewis 8		Pts: Ukawuba, Okundaye 3

SEC, Glasgow

26 July 2026
11:30

Report

New Zealand	21–9	Cayman Islands
Pts: Book 11		Pts: Hurlston-Anderson 7

SEC, Glasgow

26 July 2026
17:00

Report

New Zealand	21–13	Scotland
Pts: Book 9		Pts: Jimenez 8

SEC, Glasgow

Quarter-final

28 July 2026
17:30

Report

New Zealand	21–15	Singapore
Pts: Tonge 7		Pts: Xu 6

SEC, Glasgow

Semi-final

29 July 2026
12:00

Report

England	21–16	New Zealand
Pts: Hamilton 8		Pts: Martin 8

SEC, Glasgow

Bronze medal match

29 July 2026
16:30

Report

New Zealand	16–18	Scotland
Pts: Book 5		Pts: Jimenez 9

SEC, Glasgow

=== Women's tournament ===
Roster

- Azure Anderson
- Ella Fotu
- Eva Langton
- Sharne Pupuke-Robati

Group B

Pos	Team	Pld	W	L	PF	PA	PD	Qualification
1	New Zealand	5	5	0	105	54	+51	Direct to semi-finals
2	England	5	4	1	89	45	+44	Quarter-finals
3	Tonga	5	3	2	50	72	−22	Quarter-finals
4	Scotland (H)	5	2	3	73	67	+6	
5	Singapore	5	1	4	69	85	−16	
6	Papua New Guinea	5	0	5	33	96	−63	

Source: Glasgow 2026
Rules for classification: 1) Wins; 2) Head-to-head record; 3) Points scored.
(H) Hosts

25 July 2026
10:00

Report

New Zealand	22–6	Papua New Guinea
Pts: Pupuke-Robati 10		Pts: Dobunaba 3

SEC, Glasgow

25 July 2026
15:20

Report

New Zealand	21–8	Tonga
Pts: Pupuke-Robati 10		Pts: L Finau 5

SEC, Glasgow

25 July 2026
21:15

Report

New Zealand	21–12	England
Pts: Pupuke-Robati 11		Pts: Gayle 5

SEC, Glasgow

27 July 2026
13:10

Report

New Zealand	21–12	Scotland
Pts: Fotu 8		Pts: Brown 7

SEC, Glasgow

27 July 2026
20:20

Report

Singapore	16–22	New Zealand
Pts: Lim 8		Pts: Pupuke-Robati 10

SEC, Glasgow

Semi-final

29 July 2026
14:00

Report

New Zealand	9–21	Uganda
Pts: Pupuke-Robati 5		Pts: Akullu, Asinde 8

SEC, Glasgow

Bronze medal match

29 July 2026
17:00

Report

New Zealand	18–13	Jamaica
Pts: Pupuke-Robati 8		Pts: Reynolds 7

SEC, Glasgow

== Bowls ==
A team of 12 lawn bowlers (and two directors) was announced by the NZOC and Bowls New Zealand on 12 April 2026, with the selection of the mixed Para pair conditional on their classification by International Bowls for the Disabled.

Athlete	Event	Group stage							Semifinal	Final / BM	
Athlete	Event	Opposition Score	Opposition Score	Opposition Score	Opposition Score	Opposition Score	Opposition Score	Rank	Opposition Score	Opposition Score	Rank
Shannon McIlroy	Men's singles	Hill (TGA); W 2–0	Kelly (NIR); L 0–2	Tafatu (NIU); W 1*–1	Rittmuller (RSA); W 1*–1	Yuen (SGP); W 1.5–0.5	Graham (NFK); W 1.5–0.5	2	did not advance		
Ali Forsyth; Tony Grantham	Men's pairs	LC Prasad / S Prasad (FIJ); W 1*–1	Hill / Nathan (TGA); W 2–0	Kelly / McKeown (NIR); L 1–1*	Khan / Qureshi (PAK); W 2–0	Teys / Wedlock (AUS); W 1*–1	—N/a	2	did not advance		
Mark Noble; Kurt Smith	Men's pairs B6–8	Delgado / Reynolds (AUS); L 1–1*	James / Rees-Gibbs (RSA); W 1*–1	Brown / Sloan (SCO); W 1*–1	Gurmet Singh / Bin Mohamad (SGP); W 1*–1	Peplow / Rollings (ENG); L 1–1*	—N/a	3 Q	Peplow / Rollings (ENG); W 2–0	Delgado / Reynolds (AUS); L 0–2	2nd place, silver medalist(s)
Tayla Bruce	Women's singles	Tiong (SGP); L 0–2	O'Neill (NIR); L 1–1*	Mooketsi (BOT); W 2–0	Papani (NIU); W 2–0	Merrien (GGY); W 2–0	—N/a	3	did not advance		
Katelyn Inch; Selina Goddard	Women's pairs	Cheruiyot / Mbugua (KEN); W 1*–1	Pelemo / Sinombe (BOT); W 2–0	Boyd / McKerihen (CAN); L 1–1*	Tikoisuva / Tukai (FIJ); W 2–0	Gowen / Williams (WAL); W 1*–1	—N/a	2	did not advance		
Teri Blackbourn; Julie O'Connell	Women's pairs B6–8	Bonnell / Hoskins (AUS); W 2–0	Daud / Zakaria (MAS); W 2–0	M Wilson / P Wilson (SCO); W 1*–1	Hibberd / Stairs (CAN); W 2–0	White / Wood (ENG); L 1–1*	—N/a	1 Q	Daud / Zakaria (MAS); W 1.5–0.5	Bonnell / Hoskins (AUS); L 0.5–1.5	2nd place, silver medalist(s)
Kerrin Wheeler (directed by Colin Wheeler); Sonya Woodrow (directed by Kimberly Carraher)	Mixed pairs B2–3	England; L 0–2	Scotland; W 2–0	Wales; W 1*–1	Australia; W 2–0	South Africa; L 1–1*	—N/a	3 Q	Scotland; L 0.5–1.5	Wales; L 1–1*	4

== Boxing ==
The New Zealand squad of seven boxers (four men and three women) was announced on 12 June 2026. Super welterweight Wendell Stanley was due to compete but pulled out of the squad, shortly before the Games started.

Athlete	Event	Round of 32	Round of 16	Quarterfinals	Semifinals	Final	Rank
Athlete	Event	Opposition Result	Opposition Result	Opposition Result	Opposition Result	Opposition Result	Rank
Alex Mukuka	Men's 55 kg	Bye	Valerie (MRI); W 4–1	Haoseb (NAM); L 0–4	Did not advance		
Finbar O'Sullivan	Men's 60 kg	Devlin (SCO); L 0–5	Did not advance				
Connor Campbell	Men's 65 kg	Maukakala (FIJ); W RSC	Cassar (AUS); L 0–5	Did not advance			
Greer Hall	Women's 54 kg	—N/a	Modise (BOT); W 5–0	Delgado (CAN); L 0–5	Did not advance		
Jordan Wilson	Women's 60 kg	—N/a		Zahra (PAK); L 0–5	Did not advance		
Morgan Henderson	Women's 70 kg	—N/a		Choudhary (IND); L 1–3	Did not advance		

== Judo ==
A squad of eight judoka (five men, three women) was named on 4 June 2026, with the selection of one (Sydnee Andrews) conditional.

Athlete	Event	Round of 16	Quarterfinals	Repechage	Semifinals	Final / BM	Rank
Athlete	Event	Opposition Result	Opposition Result	Opposition Result	Opposition Result	Opposition Result	Rank
Joel Robinson	Men's 73 kg	Boyce (TTO); W IPP	Njie (GAM); L IPP	Moore (WAL); L WAZ	did not advance		
Elliott Connolly	Men's 90 kg	Mann (IND); L IPP	did not advance				
Noah Walliss	Men's 90 kg	—N/a	Cusack (SCO); W IPP	—N/a	Gaulin (CAN); L WAZ	Petgrave (ENG); L WAZ	4
Matthew Rowley	Men's 100 kg	Calder (SCO); W WAZ	Gregory (ENG); L IPP	Michael (CYP); L IPP	did not advance		
Kody Andrews	Men's +100 kg	Moore (JAM); W IPP	Monta (TGA); W IPP	—N/a	Antoniou (CYP); L IPP	Miller (SCO); W YUK	3rd place, bronze medalist(s)
Qona Christie	Women's 63 kg	—N/a	Sharma (IND); L WAZ	Ekuta (NGR); L WAZ	did not advance		
Moira de Villiers	Women's 70 kg	—N/a	Hawkes (NIR); W IPP	—N/a	Coughlan (AUS); L IPP	Yeats-Brown (ENG); L IPP	4
Sydnee Andrews	Women's +78 kg	—N/a	Durhone (MRI); W IPP	—N/a	Gnacadja Avaro (GAB); W IPP	Soppi Mbella (CMR); W IPP	1st place, gold medalist(s)

== Netball ==
New Zealand qualified as one of the top 11 eligible teams in the World Netball Rankings as of 1 September 2025. The 12-player squad, along with one travelling reserve and five non-travelling reserves, was named on 17 June 2026.

Summary

Team	Event	Group stage					Rank	Semifinal	Final / BM / Cl.	
Team	Event	Opposition Result	Opposition Result	Opposition Result	Opposition Result	Opposition Result	Rank	Opposition Result	Opposition Result	Rank
New Zealand	Women's tournament	Scotland; W 74–44	Jamaica; W 53–48	Uganda; W 58–50	Wales; W 65–37	Trinidad and Tobago; W 83–23	1 Q	England; W 61–54	Jamaica; W 56–48	1st place, gold medalist(s)

Squad

- Karin Burger (c)
- Maddy Gordon
- Catherine Hall
- Georgia Heffernan
- Kate Heffernan (vc)
- Kelly Jackson
- Grace Nweke
- Kimiora Poi
- Mila Reuelu-Buchanan
- Martina Salmon
- Carys Stythe
- Amelia Walmsley

Travelling reserve: Parris Mason
Non-travelling reserves: Kate Burley, Aliyah Dunn, Tayla Earle, Te Paea Selby-Rickit, Elisapeta Toeava

Group stage

Pos	Team	Pld	W	D	L	GF	GA	GD	Pts	Qualification
1	New Zealand	5	5	0	0	333	202	+131	10	Semi-finals
2	Jamaica	5	4	0	1	303	195	+108	8	Semi-finals
3	Uganda	5	3	0	2	303	255	+48	6	Classification matches
4	Scotland	5	2	0	3	276	258	+18	4	Classification matches
5	Wales	5	1	0	4	236	284	−48	2	Classification matches
6	Trinidad and Tobago	5	0	0	5	138	395	−257	0	Classification matches

Source: Glasgow 2026

25 July 2026; 9:00	Report	New Zealand	74–44	Scotland	OVO Hydro; Umpires: Kate Mann, Bronwen Adams; Reserve umpire: Alison Harrison
25 July 2026; 9:00	Report	Scoring by quarter: 19–11, 16–13, 18–13, 21–7			OVO Hydro; Umpires: Kate Mann, Bronwen Adams; Reserve umpire: Alison Harrison
25 July 2026; 9:00	Report	Grace Nweke 29/30 (97%); Amelia Walmsley 27/33 (82%); Georgia Heffernan 11/11 (100%); Martina Salmon 7/9 (78%)		Emma Barrie 20/23 (87%); Niamh McCall 12/17 (71%); Cerys Cairns 10/14 (71%); Bethan Goodwin 2/5 (40%)	OVO Hydro; Umpires: Kate Mann, Bronwen Adams; Reserve umpire: Alison Harrison

26 July 2026; 21:00	Report	New Zealand	53–48	Jamaica	OVO Hydro; Umpires: Georgina Sulley-Beales, Bronwen Adams; Reserve umpire: Louise Travis
26 July 2026; 21:00	Report	Scoring by quarter: 14–12, 12–13, 13–10, 14–13			OVO Hydro; Umpires: Georgina Sulley-Beales, Bronwen Adams; Reserve umpire: Louise Travis
26 July 2026; 21:00	Report	Grace Nweke 47/56 (84%); Georgia Heffernan 6/8 (75%)		Romelda Aiken-George 34/38 (89%); Shanice Beckford 14/15 (93%)	OVO Hydro; Umpires: Georgina Sulley-Beales, Bronwen Adams; Reserve umpire: Louise Travis

28 July 2026; 19:00	Report	Uganda	50–58	New Zealand	OVO Hydro; Umpires: Louise Travis, Bronwen Adams; Reserve umpire: Justin Barnes
28 July 2026; 19:00	Report	Scoring by quarter: 14–15, 11–13, 10–16, 15–14			OVO Hydro; Umpires: Louise Travis, Bronwen Adams; Reserve umpire: Justin Barnes
28 July 2026; 19:00	Report	Mary Cholhok 30/33 (91%); Shadiah Nassanga 19/20 (95%); Racheal Nanyonga 1/2 (50%)		Grace Nweke 19/20 (95%); Martina Salmon 16/20 (80%); Amelia Walsmley 14/16 (88%); Georgia Heffernan 9/10 (90%)	OVO Hydro; Umpires: Louise Travis, Bronwen Adams; Reserve umpire: Justin Barnes

29 July 2026; 19:00	Report	New Zealand	65–37	Wales	OVO Hydro; Umpires: Gary Burgess, Justin Barnes; Reserve umpire: Kate Mann
29 July 2026; 19:00	Report	Scoring by quarter: 17–7, 19–8, 15–10, 14–12			OVO Hydro; Umpires: Gary Burgess, Justin Barnes; Reserve umpire: Kate Mann
29 July 2026; 19:00	Report	Martina Salmon 30/35 (86%); Amelia Walsmley 28/30 (93%); Georgia Heffernan 7/8 (88%)		Georgia Rowe 18/19 (95%); Zoe Matthewman 9/9 (100%); Nansi Kuti 5/6 (83%); Phillipa Yarranton 5/7 (71%)	OVO Hydro; Umpires: Gary Burgess, Justin Barnes; Reserve umpire: Kate Mann

30 July 2026; 14:00	Report	New Zealand	83–23	Trinidad and Tobago	OVO Hydro; Umpires: Tracy-Ann Griffiths, Kate Mann; Reserve umpire: Louise Travis
30 July 2026; 14:00	Report	Scoring by quarter: 21–4, 20–9, 23–5, 19–5			OVO Hydro; Umpires: Tracy-Ann Griffiths, Kate Mann; Reserve umpire: Louise Travis
30 July 2026; 14:00	Report	Grace Nweke 34/36 (94%); Amelia Walmsley 34/38 (89%); Martina Salmon 15/16 (94%)		Afeisha Noel 21/24 (88%); Joelisa Cooper 2/3 (67%)	OVO Hydro; Umpires: Tracy-Ann Griffiths, Kate Mann; Reserve umpire: Louise Travis

Semi-final

1 August 2026; 9:00	Report	New Zealand	61–54	England	OVO Hydro; Umpires: Bronwen Adams, Georgina Sulley-Beales; Reserve umpire: Justin Barnes
1 August 2026; 9:00	Report	Scoring by quarter: 16–11, 13–13, 17–13, 15–17			OVO Hydro; Umpires: Bronwen Adams, Georgina Sulley-Beales; Reserve umpire: Justin Barnes
1 August 2026; 9:00	Report	Grace Nweke 52/57 (91%); Georgia Heffernan 9/10 (90%)		Eleanor Cardwell 23/24 (96%); Olivia Tchine 16/17 (94%); Lois Pearson 11/16 (69%); Sasha Glasgow 5/5 (100%)	OVO Hydro; Umpires: Bronwen Adams, Georgina Sulley-Beales; Reserve umpire: Justin Barnes

Gold medal match

2 August 2026; 13:00	Report	Jamaica	48–56	New Zealand	OVO Hydro; Umpires: Bronwen Adams, Georgina Sulley-Beales; Reserve umpire: Justin Barnes
2 August 2026; 13:00	Report	Scoring by quarter: 13–16, 12–12, 11–13, 12–15			OVO Hydro; Umpires: Bronwen Adams, Georgina Sulley-Beales; Reserve umpire: Justin Barnes
2 August 2026; 13:00	Report	Romelda Aiken 32/36 (89%); Shanice Beckford 16/18 (89%)		Grace Nweke 48/54 (89%); Georgia Heffernan 8/9 (89%)	OVO Hydro; Umpires: Bronwen Adams, Georgina Sulley-Beales; Reserve umpire: Justin Barnes

== Swimming ==
A team of 13 swimmers (4 men and 9 women) was named on 8 June 2026.

Athlete	Event	Heat		Semifinal		Final	
Athlete	Event	Time	Rank	Time	Rank	Time	Rank
Lewis Clareburt	Men's 200 m butterfly	1:57.35	2 Q	—N/a		1:55.05	1st place, gold medalist(s)
Lewis Clareburt	Men's 200 m freestyle	1:46.92	6 Q	—N/a		1:46.40	7
Lewis Clareburt	Men's 200 m individual medley	1:58.79	4 Q	—N/a		1:56.77	2nd place, silver medalist(s)
Lewis Clareburt	Men's 400 m individual medley	4:16.49	1 Q	—N/a		4:08.72	1st place, gold medalist(s)
Caitlin Deans	Women's 400 m freestyle	4:10.16	5 Q	—N/a		4:09.45	6
Caitlin Deans	Women's 800 m freestyle	—N/a				8:33.21	4
Caitlin Deans	Women's 1500 m freestyle	—N/a				16:08.62	5
Chelsey Edwards	Women's 50 m freestyle	25.02	4 Q	25.85	7 Q	25.17	7
Chelsey Edwards	Women's 100 m freestyle	56.72	22	did not advance			
Erika Fairweather	Women's 200 m freestyle	1:58.39	5 Q	—N/a		1:55.24	3rd place, bronze medalist(s)
Erika Fairweather	Women's 400 m freestyle	4:06.42	1 Q	—N/a		4:02.65	2nd place, silver medalist(s)
Erika Fairweather	Women's 800 m freestyle	—N/a				8:24.97	2nd place, silver medalist(s)
Erika Fairweather	Women's 1500 m freestyle	—N/a				15:58.97	2nd place, silver medalist(s)
Amber George	Women's 50 m backstroke	28.78	10 Q	28.37	7 Q	28.33	6
Amber George	Women's 100 m backstroke	1:01.46	9 Q	1:01.24	11	did not advance	
Cameron Gray	Men's 50 m butterfly	24.40	19	did not advance			
Cameron Gray	Men's 100 m freestyle	50.19	17 R	did not advance			
Savannah-Eve Martin	Women's 50 m backstroke	28.19	5 Q	28.28	6 Q	28.43	7
Savannah-Eve Martin	Women's 100 m backstroke	1:01.74	12 Q	1:01.35	12	did not advance	
Hazel Ouwehand	Women's 50 m butterfly	26.40	5 Q	26.01	3 Q	25.76	3rd place, bronze medalist(s)
Hazel Ouwehand	Women's 100 m butterfly	1:00.33	9 Q	58.56	7 Q	59.63	8
Zoe Pedersen	Women's 50 m butterfly	26.60	7 Q	26.38	6 Q	26.24	5
Zoe Pedersen	Women's 50 m freestyle	25.60	12 Q	25.63	13	did not advance	
Zoe Pedersen	Women's 100 m freestyle	55.18	5 Q	55.49	12	did not advance	
Carter Swift	Men's 100 m freestyle	49.40	9 Q	48.77	8 Q	49.07	8
Milana Tapper	Women's 50 m freestyle	25.99	17 R	25.85	16	did not advance	
Eve Thomas	Women's 400 m freestyle	4:11.05	7 Q	—N/a		4:12.23	8
Eve Thomas	Women's 800 m freestyle	—N/a				8:34.99	7
Eve Thomas	Women's 1500 m freestyle	—N/a				16:29.63	8
Joshua Willmer	Men's 100 m breaststroke SB9	1:11.99	2 Q	—N/a		1:11.44	2nd place, silver medalist(s)
Caitlin Deans; Erika Fairweather; Milana Tapper; Eve Thomas	Women's 4 × 200 m freestyle	—N/a				7:51.94	3rd place, bronze medalist(s)
Erika Fairweather; Chelsey Edwards; Cameron Gray; Carter Swift	Mixed 4 × 100 m freestyle	3:28.19	3 Q	—N/a		3:24.82	4

== Track cycling ==
A squad of 19 cyclists was named on 3 June 2026. Games debutant Nick Kergozou was ruled out of competition after sustaining a back injury during training.

Sprint

Athlete	Event	Qualification		Round 1	Quarterfinals	Semifinals	Final / BM	
Athlete	Event	Time	Rank	Opposition Time	Opposition Time	Opposition Time	Opposition Time	Rank
Sam Dakin	Men's sprint	10.204	20	did not advance				
Ellesse Andrews	Women's sprint	10.692	9 Q	Alessia McCaig (AUS); W 10.763	Emma Finucane (WAL); L 10.744, L 10.927	did not advance		
Olivia King	Women's sprint	10.832	14 Q	Rhianna Parris-Smith (ENG); L 11.298	did not advance			
Rebecca Petch	Women's sprint	10.926	16 Q	Emma Finucane (WAL); L 10.864	did not advance			
Ellesse Andrews; Olivia King; Rebecca Petch	Women's team sprint	47.852	5	did not advance				
Emma Foy; Jessie Hodges - pilot	Women's tandem sprint B	11.233	4 Q	—N/a		Elizabeth Jordan; Sylvia Misztal - pilot (ENG); W 11.521, W 11.734, QG	Jessica Gallagher; Jacqui Mengler-Mohr - pilot (AUS); L 11.840, W 11.758, W 11.620	1st place, gold medalist(s)

Keirin

Athlete	Event	1st Round	Repechage	Semifinals	Final
Athlete	Event	Rank	Rank	Rank	Rank
Sam Dakin	Men's keirin	5 R	4	did not advance	
Ellesse Andrews	Women's keirin	1 Q	—N/a	1 Q	2nd place, silver medalist(s)
Olivia King	Women's keirin	5 R	3 Q	5	7

Time trial

Athlete	Event	Time	Rank
Sam Dakin	Men's time trial	1:02.589	15
Daniel Morton	Men's time trial	1:03.656	18
Ellesse Andrews	Women's time trial	1:05.737	3rd place, bronze medalist(s)
Emma Foy; Jessie Hodges	Women's tandem time trial B	1:06.367	1st place, gold medalist(s)
Devon Briggs	Men's 1 km time trial C1-3	1:05.536	1st place, gold medalist(s)
Nicole Murray	Women's 1 km time trial C4-5	1:13.653	4

Pursuit

Athlete	Event	Qualification		Final / BM	
Athlete	Event	Time	Rank	Opponent Results	Rank
Marshall Erwood	Men's individual pursuit	4:07.415	7	did not advance	
Daniel Morton	Men's individual pursuit	4:14.069	11	did not advance	
Tom Sexton	Men's individual pursuit	4:19.657	14	did not advance	
Bryony Botha	Women's individual pursuit	4:32.548	4 QB	Erin Boothman (SCO); L 4:31.496	4
Emily Shearman	Women's individual pursuit	4:35.688	8	did not advance	
Tom Sexton; Daniel Morton; Keegan Hornblow; George Jackson; Marshall Erwood	Men's team pursuit	3:53.383	3 QB	Wales; W 3:52.310	3rd place, bronze medalist(s)
Emily Shearman; Ally Wollaston; Bryony Botha; Prudence Fowler; Samantha Donnelly	Women's team pursuit	4:13.698	2 QG	Australia; L 4:12.775	2nd place, silver medalist(s)
Devon Briggs	Men's individual pursuit C1-3	3:25.889	3 QB	Gordon Allan (AUS); W 3:26.682	3rd place, bronze medalist(s)
Nicole Murray	Women's individual pursuit C4-5	5:06.878	3 QB	Erin Normoyle (AUS); W 5:06.199	3rd place, bronze medalist(s)

Points race

Athlete	Event	Qualification		Final	
Athlete	Event	Points	Rank	Points	Rank
Keegan Hornblow	Men's points race	14	6 Q	47	7
George Jackson	Men's points race	32	2 Q	61	3rd place, bronze medalist(s)
Tom Sexton	Men's points race	13	7 Q	53	5
Bryony Botha	Women's points race	—N/a		25	8
Emily Shearman	Women's points race	—N/a		23	9
Ally Wollaston	Women's points race	—N/a		47	4

Scratch race

Athlete	Event	Qualification	Final
Marshall Erwood	Men's scratch race	6 Q	10
Keegan Hornblow	Men's scratch race	4 Q	7
George Jackson	Men's scratch race	1 Q	12
Samantha Donnelly	Women's scratch race	—N/a	2nd place, silver medalist(s)
Prudence Fowler	Women's scratch race	—N/a	16
Ally Wollaston	Women's scratch race	—N/a	18

Elimination race

Athlete	Event	Rank
Keegan Hornblow	Men's elimination race	6
George Jackson	Men's elimination race	19
Tom Sexton	Men's elimination race	4
Samantha Donnelly	Women's elimination race	10
Prudence Fowler	Women's elimination race	12
Ally Wollaston	Women's elimination race	5

== Weightlifting ==
On 18 May 2026, the IWF Commonwealth Games weightlifting ranking lists were finalised. The top eight ranked lifters, limited to one per CGA, and not including Scotland (who got automatic host spots) and the directly qualified reigning Commonwealth Weightlifting champions, gained a quota place for the games in their weight class. On 22 June 2026, the New Zealand team of seven lifters (three men and four women) was announced by the NZOC.

Athlete	Event	Snatch				Clean & jerk				Total	Rank
Athlete	Event	1	2	3	Result	1	2	3	Result	Total	Rank
Marco Mollo	Men's 79 kg	129	133	~~137~~	133	165	~~170~~	~~170~~	165	298	7
Cameron McTaggart	Men's 88 kg	150	154	~~157~~	154	180	184	~~192~~	184	338	2nd place, silver medalist(s)
David Liti	Men's +110 kg	156	166	~~176~~	166	207	223	–	223	389	1st place, gold medalist(s)
Olivia Selemaia	Women's 69 kg	~~100~~	~~100~~	~~100~~	NVL	DNF					
Georgia Theron	Women's 77 kg	95	98	100	100	117	120	123	123	223	4
Litia Nacagilevu	Women's 86 kg	~~103~~	103	~~106~~	103	~~121~~	122	~~125~~	122	225	4
Tui-Alofa Patolo	Women's +86 kg	109	112	115	115	130	~~135~~	~~136~~	130	245	4

== Officials ==
In November 2024, Nigel Avery was named chef de mission of the New Zealand team for the 2026 Commonwealth Games.

== See also ==
- New Zealand at the 2026 Winter Olympics
- New Zealand at the 2026 Winter Paralympics
