= Track cycling at the 2026 Commonwealth Games – Women's tandem 1 km time trial B =

Women's tandem 1 km time trial B at the 2026 Commonwealth Games
- Venue: Sir Chris Hoy Velodrome
- Dates: 1 August
- Competitors: 12 (including pilots) from 4 nations
- Winning time: 1:06.367

Medalists
gold medal	Emma Foy; Jessie Hodges (pilot)	New Zealand
silver medal	Jessica Gallagher; Jacqueline Mengler-Mohr (pilot)	Australia
bronze medal	Sophie Unwin; Anna Whitworth-Hay (pilot)	England

The Women's tandem 1 km time trial B at the 2026 Commonwealth Games was part of the cycling programme and took place on 1 August 2026. This event was for blind and visually impaired cyclists riding with a sighted pilot.

== Records ==
Prior to this competition, the existing world and Games records were as follows:

World record	Sophie Thornhill (GBR)	1:04.623	Brisbane, Australia	7 April 2018
Games record	Sophie Thornhill (ENG)	1:04.623	Brisbane, Australia	7 April 2018

== Schedule ==
The schedule was as follows

All times are British Summer Time (UTC+1)

Date	Time	Round
Saturday 1 August 2026	15:16	Final

== Result ==
The results of the time trial were as follows:

Rank	Nation	Riders	Time	Behind	Avg. speed (km/h)	Notes
1st place, gold medalist(s)	New Zealand	Emma Foy; Jessie Hodges (pilot)	1:06.367	–	54.244	
2nd place, silver medalist(s)	Australia	Jessica Gallagher; Jacqueline Mengler-Mohr (pilot)	1:06.852	+0.485	53.850	
3rd place, bronze medalist(s)	England	Sophie Unwin; Anna Whitworth-Hay (pilot)	1:06.962	+0.595	53.762	
4	England	Elizabeth Jordan; Sylvia Misztal (pilot)	1:07.977	+1.610	52.959	
5	Malaysia	Nur Suraiya Muhammad Zamri; Farina Shawati Mohn Adnan (pilot)	1:13.507	+7.140	48.975	
6	Malaysia	Nur Azlia Syafinaz Mohd Zais; Nurul Suhada Zainal (pilot)	1:15.602	+9.235	47.618	
