= Track cycling at the 2026 Commonwealth Games – Women's tandem sprint B =

Women's tandem sprint B at the 2026 Commonwealth Games
- Venue: Sir Chris Hoy Velodrome
- Dates: 30 July
- Competitors: 6 from 4 nations

Medalists
gold medal	Emma Foy; Jessie Hodges	New Zealand
silver medal	Jessica Gallagher; Jacqueline Mengler-Mohr	Australia
bronze medal	Elizabeth Jordan; Sylvia Misztal	England

The women's tandem sprint B at the 2026 Commonwealth Games was part of the cycling programme, and took place on 30 July 2026.

== Records ==
Prior to this competition, the existing world and Games records were as follows:

World record	Sophie Thornhill (ENG)	10.609	Brisbane, Australia	5 April 2018
Games record	Sophie Thornhill (ENG)	10.609	Brisbane, Australia	5 April 2018

== Schedule ==
The schedule is as follows:

All times are British Summer Time (UTC+1)

Date	Time	Round
Friday 30 July 2026	10:02	Qualifying
Friday 30 July 2026	10:47	Semifinals
Friday 30 July 2026	16:02	Finals

== Results ==
=== Qualifying ===
Qualification was by way of a 200 metre 'flying lap' time trial. The top four tandems progressed to the semi finals.

Rank	Name	Country	Time	Time behind	Average Speed (km/h)	Notes
1	Elizabeth Jordan; Pilot:Sylvia Misztal	England	10.870	—	66.237	Q
2	Sophie Unwin; Pilot:Anna Whitworth-Hay	England	10.890	+0.200	66.116	Q
3	Jessica Gallagher; Pilot:Jacqueline Mengler-Mohr	Australia	11.042	+0.172	65.206	Q
4	Emma Foy; Pilot:Jessie Hodges	New Zealand	11.233	+0.363	64.097	Q
5	Nur Suraiya Muhammad Zamri; Pilot:Farina Shawati Mohd Adnan	Malaysia	11.834	+0.964	60.842	
6	Nur Azlia Syafinaz Mohd Zais; Pilot:Nurul Suhada Zainal	Malaysia	12.799	+1.929	56.254	

=== Semifinals ===
The winners race for the gold and silver medals. The losers race for third place.

Rank	Name	Country	Race 1	Race 2	Decider	Notes
Heat 1
1	Emma Foy; Pilot:Jessie Hodges	New Zealand	Winner	Winner		QG
2	Elizabeth Jordan; Pilot:Sylvia Misztal	England	+0.155	+1.440		QB
			62.495 km/h	61.251 km/h		
Heat 2
1	Jessica Gallagher; Pilot:Jacqueline Mengler-Mohr	Australia	Winner	Winner		QG
2	Sophie Unwin; Pilot:Anna Whitworth-Hay	England	+0.386	+0.288		QB
			61.251 km/h	61.821 km/h		

=== Finals ===
The final classification is determined in the medal finals.

Rank	Name	Country	Race 1	Race 2	Decider	Notes
For gold
1st place, gold medalist(s)	Emma Foy; Pilot:Jessie Hodges	New Zealand	+0.207	Winner	Winner	
2nd place, silver medalist(s)	Jessica Gallagher; Pilot:Jacqueline Mengler-Mohr	Australia	Winner	+0.055	+2.655	
			60.811 km/h	61.235 k/mh	61.962 km/h	
For bronze
3rd place, bronze medalist(s)	Elizabeth Jordan; Pilot:Sylvia Misztal	England	Winner	Winner		
4	Sophie Unwin; Pilot:Anna Whitworth-Hay	England	+0.114	+0.233		
			60.155 km/h	59.860 km/h		
