= Swimming at the 2026 Commonwealth Games – Women's 1500 metre freestyle =

Women's 1500 metre freestyle at the 2026 Commonwealth Games
- Venue: Tollcross International Swimming Centre
- Dates: 26 July
- Winning time: 15:41.03

Medalists
gold medal	Lani Pallister	Australia
silver medal	Erika Fairweather	New Zealand
bronze medal	Molly Walker	Australia

The women's 1500 metre freestyle event at the 2026 Commonwealth Games was held on 26 July at the Tollcross International Swimming Centre. This will be first time that a women's 1500 metre freestyle will be contested at the Commonwealth Games with both this event and the men's 800 metre freestyle added to the 2026 swimming program.

== Schedule ==
The schedule is as follows:

All times are British Summer Time (UTC+1)

Date	Time	Round
Sunday 26 July 2026	10:30	Slower heats
Sunday 26 July 2026	19:00	Fastest heat

== Results ==
=== Timed final ===
Timed final results
Rank	Heat	Lane	Swimmer	Nation	Time	Notes
1st place, gold medalist(s)	1	4	Lani Pallister	Australia	15:41.03	
2nd place, silver medalist(s)	1	5	Erika Fairweather	New Zealand	15:58.97	
3rd place, bronze medalist(s)	1	1	Molly Walker	Australia	16:01.36	
4	1	3	Gan Ching Hwee	Singapore	16:06.00	
5	1	7	Caitlin Deans	New Zealand	16:08.62	
6	1	6	Tiana Kritzinger	Australia	16:11.18	
7	1	8	Amelie Blocksidge	England	16:27.55	
8	1	2	Eve Thomas	New Zealand	16:29.63	
9	2	4	Kyra Rabess	Cayman Islands	17:12.27	
10	2	5	Sarah Sim	Singapore	17:22.06	
11	2	2	Clara Ginnis	Jersey	17:36.94	
12	2	1	Hannah Sterry	Jersey	17:41.15	
13	2	6	Harper Barrowman	Cayman Islands	17:55.90	
