= Swimming at the 2026 Commonwealth Games – Women's 400 metre freestyle =

Women's 400 metre freestyle at the 2026 Commonwealth Games
- Venue: Tollcross International Swimming Centre
- Dates: 24 July
- Competitors: 27 from 14 nations
- Winning time: 3:59.56

Medalists
gold medal	Lani Pallister	Australia
silver medal	Erika Fairweather	New Zealand
bronze medal	Jenna Forrester	Australia

The women's 400 metre freestyle event at the 2026 Commonwealth Games was held on 24 July at the Tollcross International Swimming Centre.

== Schedule ==
The schedule is as follows:

All times are British Summer Time (UTC+1)

Date	Time	Round
Friday 24 July 2026	10:30	Heats
Friday 24 July 2026	19:07	Final

== Results ==
=== Heats ===
The heats were held at 10:30 on 24 July 2026.

Heat results
Rank	Heat	Lane	Swimmer	Nation	Time	Notes
1	3	4	Erika Fairweather	New Zealand	4:06.42	Q
2	4	4	Lani Pallister	Australia	4:06.88	Q
3	4	5	Jenna Forrester	Australia	4:07.34	Q
4	3	5	Amelia Weber	Australia	4:08.12	Q
5	3	3	Caitlin Deans	New Zealand	4:10.16	Q
6	3	6	Ella Jansen	Canada	4:10.55	Q
7	4	3	Eve Thomas	New Zealand	4:11.05	Q
8	4	2	Gan Ching Hwee	Singapore	4:11.10	Q
9	4	1	Julie Brousseau	Canada	4:11.90	R
10	4	6	Amalie Smith	England	4:12.97	R
11	3	2	Lucy Fox	England	4:12.98	
12	4	7	Duné Coetzee	South Africa	4:14.93	
13	2	5	Evi Mackie	Scotland	4:16.74	
14	2	3	Joanna Evans	Bahamas	4:17.20	
15	4	8	Alexandra Bastone	Wales	4:18.10	
16	3	1	Amelie Blocksidge	England	4:18.13	
17	2	6	Kyra Rabess	Cayman Islands	4:19.09 NR	
18	3	8	Hannah Robertson	South Africa	4:19.58	
19	2	4	Sasha Gatt	Malta	4:19.72	
20	2	7	Clara Ginnis	Jersey	4:26.73	
21	2	1	Harper Barrowman	Cayman Islands	4:27.82	
22	2	2	Sarah Sim	Singapore	4:29.36	
23	1	4	Hannah Sterry	Jersey	4:32.09	
24	1	5	Kiera Prentice	Isle of Man	4:32.94	
25	2	8	Lauren Dennett	Isle of Man	4:32.96	
26	1	3	Delphine Riley	Guernsey	4:36.16	
27	1	6	Elodie Riley	Guernsey	4:41.16	
	3	7	Megan Barnes	Scotland		DNS

=== Final ===
The final was held at 19:07 on 24 July 2026.

Final results
Rank	Lane	Swimmer	Nation	Time	Notes
1st place, gold medalist(s)	5	Lani Pallister	Australia	3:59.56	
2nd place, silver medalist(s)	4	Erika Fairweather	New Zealand	4:02.65	
3rd place, bronze medalist(s)	3	Jenna Forrester	Australia	4:05.25	
4	6	Amelia Weber	Australia	4:08.70	
5	8	Gan Ching Hwee	Singapore	4:09.34	
6	2	Caitlin Deans	New Zealand	4:09.45	
7	7	Ella Jansen	Canada	4:09.75	
8	1	Eve Thomas	New Zealand	4:12.23	
