= Swimming at the 2026 Commonwealth Games – Women's 800 metre freestyle =

Women's 800 metre freestyle at the 2026 Commonwealth Games
- Venue: Tollcross International Swimming Centre
- Dates: 28 July
- Winning time: 8:11.12

Medalists
gold medal	Lani Pallister	Australia
silver medal	Erika Fairweather	New Zealand
bronze medal	Molly Walker	Australia

The women's 800 metre freestyle event at the 2026 Commonwealth Games was held on 28 July at the Tollcross International Swimming Centre.

== Schedule ==
The schedule is as follows:

All times are British Summer Time (UTC+1)

Date	Time	Round
Tuesday 28 July 2026	10:30	Slower heats
Tuesday 28 July 2026	19:00	Fastest heat

== Results ==
=== Timed final ===
The 800 and 1500 metres events are held in a time trial format; swimmers with slower entry times swim in the morning 'heats', while the swimmers with the eight fastest entry times swim in the 'timed final' in the evening session. The times of all the swims are then combined to create a single final result.

Timed final results
Rank	Heat	Lane	Swimmer	Nation	Time	Notes
1st place, gold medalist(s)	3	4	Lani Pallister	Australia	8:11.12	GR
2nd place, silver medalist(s)	3	5	Erika Fairweather	New Zealand	8:24.97	
3rd place, bronze medalist(s)	3	3	Molly Walker	Australia	8:25.93	
4	3	6	Caitlin Deans	New Zealand	8:33.21	
5	3	1	Tiana Kritzinger	Australia	8:33.28	
6	3	7	Gan Ching Hwee	Singapore	8:33.65	
7	3	2	Eve Thomas	New Zealand	8:34.99	
8	3	8	Amelie Blocksidge	England	8:38.80	
9	2	5	Dune Coetzee	South Africa	8:44.23	
10	2	3	Alexandra Bastone	Wales	8:54.32	
11	2	6	Sashaa Gatt	Malta	8:56.85	
12	2	7	Kyra Rabess	Cayman Islands	9:00.85	
13	2	2	Sarah Sim	Singapore	9:05.98	
14	1	4	Harper Barrowman	Cayman Islands	9:13.72	
15	2	1	Hannah Sterry	Jersey	9:15.37	
16	2	8	Clara Ginnis	Jersey	9:20.49	
17	1	6	Lauren Dennett	Isle of Man	9:31.16	
18	1	5	Kiera Prentice	Isle of Man	9:31.21	
19	1	3	Delphine Riley	Guernsey	9:34.74	
20	1	2	Elodie Riley	Guernsey	9:45.48	
21	2	4	Julie Brousseau	Canada		DNS
