= Bowls at the 2026 Commonwealth Games – Men's pairs B6–8 =

Bowls event

Bowls men's pairs B6-8 at the 2026 Commonwealth Games
- Venue: SEC Centre
- Dates: 23 July – 28 July 2026
- Competitors: 12 from 6 nations

Medalists
gold medal	Damien Delgado; James Reynolds	Australia
silver medal	Kurt Smith; Mark Noble	New Zealand
bronze medal	Joe Peplow; Kieran Rollings	England

Bowls at the 2026 Commonwealth Games – Men's pairs B6-8 was held at the SEC Centre in Glasgow from 28 July to 3 August. Six nations entered the event. Damien Delgado and James Reynolds of Australia won the gold medal, defeating New Zealand's Kurt Smith and Mark Noble in the final. Joe Peplow and Kieran Rollings from England won the bronze medal.

== Round Robin ==
The top four advance to the knockout stage.

Rank	Athlete	MP	MW	MT	ML	FR	AG	PD	PTS
1	Damien Delgado /James Reynolds (AUS)	5	5	0	0	43	39	+4	15
2	Joe Peplow / Kieran Rollings (ENG)	5	3	0	2	47	48	–1	9
3	Mark Noble / Kurt Smith (NZL)	5	3	0	2	42	48	–6	9
4	Garry Brown / Stuart Sloan (SCO)	5	2	0	3	45	38	+7	6
5	G Rees-Gibbs / Jarid James (RSA)	5	2	0	3	46	35	+11	6
6	Khirmern Bin Mohamad / Mawjit Singh (SGP)	5	0	0	5	35	50	–15	0

	Scotland	South Africa	Singapore	New Zealand	England	Australia
Scotland	—	2–0	2–0	1–1*	1–1*	0.5–1.5
South Africa	0–2	—	1*–1	1–1*	2–0	1–1*
Singapore	0–2	1–1*	—	1–1*	0–2	1–1*
New Zealand	1*–1	1*–1	1*–1	—	1–1*	1–1*
England	1*–1	0–2	2–0	1*–1	—	1–1*
Australia	1.5–0.5	1*–1	1*–1	1*–1	1*–1	—

== Knockout stage ==
Semifinals
Australia	2
Scotland	0
England	0
New Zealand	2

Final
Australia	2
New Zealand	0
Bronze final
Scotland	1
England	1*
