= Bowls at the 2026 Commonwealth Games – Women's pairs B6–8 =

Bowls event

Bowls women's pairs B6-8 at the 2026 Commonwealth Games
- Venue: SEC Centre
- Dates: 28 July – 3 August 2026
- Competitors: 12 from 6 nations

Medalists
gold medal	Louise Hoskins; Serena Bonnell	Australia
silver medal	Julie O'Connell; Teri Blackbourn	New Zealand
bronze medal	Norazian Daud; Jariah Zakaria	Malaysia

Bowls at the 2026 Commonwealth Games – Women's pairs B6-8 was held at the SEC Centre in Glasgow from 28 July to 3 August. Six nations entered the event. Louise Hoskins and Serena Bonnell of Australia won the gold medal, defeating New Zealand's Julie O'Connell and Teri Blacbourn in the final. Norazian Daud and Jariah Zakaria from Malaysia won the bronze medal.

== Round Robin ==
The top four doubles advance to the knockout stage.

=== Section A ===
Rank	Athlete	MP	MW	MT	ML	FR	AG	PD	PTS
1	Teri Blackbourn/Julie O'Connell (NZL)	5	4	0	1	59	34	+25	12
2	Mary Wilson / Pauline Wilson (SCO)	5	3	0	2	44	41	+3	9
3	Louise Hoskins / Serena Bonnell (AUS)	5	3	0	2	53	36	+17	9
4	Jariah Zakaria / Norazian Daud (MAS)	5	3	0	2	49	43	+6	9
5	Michelle White / Helen Wood (ENG)	5	2	0	3	44	47	–3	6
6	Anne Hibberd / Jean Stairs (CAN)	5	0	0	5	25	73	–48	0

	Scotland	Malaysia	Canada	New Zealand	England	Australia
Scotland	—	1–1*	2–0	1–1*	1*–1	2–0
Malaysia	1*–1	—	2–0	0–2	2–0	0.5–1.5
Canada	0–2	0–2	—	0–2	0.5–1.5	0–2
New Zealand	1*–1	2–0	2–0	—	1–1*	2–0
England	1–1*	0–2	1.5–0.5	1*–1	—	0–2
Australia	0–2	1.5–0.5	2–0	0–2	2–0	—

== Knockout stage ==
Semifinals
New Zealand	1.5
Malaysia	0.5
Scotland	0
Australia	2

Final
New Zealand	0.5
Australia	1.5
Bronze final
Malaysia	2
Scotland	0
