= Cayman Islands at the 2026 Commonwealth Games =

- Flag of the Cayman Islands
- CG code: CAY
- CGA: Cayman Islands Olympic Committee
- Website: caymanolympic.org.ky

in Glasgow, Scotland 23 July 2026 – 2 August 2026
- Competitors: 20 in 3 sports
- Flag bearer: Connor Macdonald
- Baton bearer: Siena Santiago
- Medals: Gold 0 Silver 0 Bronze 0 Total 0

Commonwealth Games appearances (overview)
- 1978; 1982; 1986; 1990; 1994; 1998; 2002; 2006; 2010; 2014; 2018; 2022; 2026; 2030

The Cayman Islands competed at the 2026 Commonwealth Games in Glasgow, Scotland. This marked The Cayman Islands' 13th participation at the games, after making its debut at the 1978 Commonwealth Games.

The King's Baton relay stopped in the Cayman Islands in late May and early June 2025.

The Cayman Islands team consisted of 20 athletes (11 men and nine women) competing in three sports.

Swimmer Connor Macdonald was the country's flagbearer during the opening ceremony. Meanwhile, artistic gymnast Siena Santiago was the baton bearer during the opening ceremony.

Four the fourth consecutive Games, the Cayman Islands failed to win a medal.

== Competitors ==
The following is the list of number of competitors participating at the Games per sport/discipline.

Sport	Men	Women	Total
3x3 basketball	4	4	8
Artistic gymnastics	1	1	2
Swimming	6	4	10
Total	11	9	20

== 3x3 basketball ==
The Cayman Islands qualified a men's and women's 3x3 basketball teams. This marked the country's debut in the sport at the Commonwealth Games. Both the men's and women's team lost all five of their games, and finished ranked in last (12th place) in each respective tournament.

Summary

Team	Event	Group stage						Play-ins	Semifinal	Final / BM / CM	
Team	Event	Opposition Score	Opposition Score	Opposition Score	Opposition Score	Opposition Score	Rank	Opposition Score	Opposition Score	Opposition Score	Rank
Cayman Islands men	Men's tournament	Nigeria; L 17–21	Scotland; L 13–22	Guyana; L 17–21	New Zealand; L 9–21	Australia; L 5–21	6	Did not advance			12
Cayman Islands women	Women's tournament	Fiji; L 6–16	Uganda; L 7–21	Jamaica; L 5–21	Australia; L 3–21	Kenya; L 8–22	6	Did not advance			12

=== Men's tournament ===
Roster

The roster was confirmed in July 2026.

- Brad Lansdell
- Brian Ebanks-Perez
- Alwin Buttrum Jr.
- Nathaniel Hurlston-Anderson

Group A

Pos	Team	Pld	W	L	PF	PA	PD	Qualification
1	Australia	5	5	0	105	60	+45	Direct to semi-finals
2	New Zealand	5	4	1	99	56	+43	Quarter-finals
3	Scotland (H)	5	3	2	90	85	+5	Quarter-finals
4	Nigeria	5	2	3	82	99	−17	
5	Guyana	5	1	4	68	100	−32	
6	Cayman Islands	5	0	5	61	105	−44	

Source: Glasgow 2026
Rules for classification: 1) Wins; 2) Head-to-head record; 3) Points scored.
(H) Hosts

24 July 2026
10:50

Report

Nigeria	21–17	Cayman Islands
Pts: Nwamu, Okundaye 6		Pts: Lansdell 11

SEC, Glasgow

24 July 2026
15:45

Report

Scotland	22–13	Cayman Islands
Pts: White 15		Pts: Lansdell 7

SEC, Glasgow

24 July 2026
19:50

Report

Cayman Islands	17–21	Guyana
Pts: Hurlston-Anderson 11		Pts: Ramlall 9

SEC, Glasgow

26 July 2026
11:30

Report

New Zealand	21–9	Cayman Islands
Pts: Book 11		Pts: Hurlston-Anderson 7

SEC, Glasgow

26 July 2026
20:20

Report

Australia	21–5	Cayman Islands
Pts: McDaniel 12		Pts: Hurlston-Anderson, Ebanks-Perez 2

SEC, Glasgow

=== Women's tournament ===
Roster

The roster was confirmed in July 2026.

- Lyandrea Watson
- Jamie Rankin-Maize
- Khailan O’Connor
- Courtisha Ebanks

Group A

Pos	Team	Pld	W	L	PF	PA	PD	Qualification
1	Australia	5	5	0	105	33	+72	Direct to semi-finals
2	Uganda	5	4	1	90	58	+32	Quarter-finals
3	Jamaica	5	3	2	89	75	+14	Quarter-finals
4	Kenya	5	2	3	63	85	−22	
5	Fiji	5	1	4	56	81	−25	
6	Cayman Islands	5	0	5	29	100	−71	

Source: Glasgow 2026
Rules for classification: 1) Wins; 2) Head-to-head record; 3) Points scored.

24 July 2026
11:15

Report

Fiji	16–6	Cayman Islands
Pts: Tuisue 7		Pts: O'Connor 4

SEC, Glasgow

24 July 2026
15:20

Report

Uganda	21–7	Cayman Islands
Pts: Akullu 10		Pts: O'Connor 6

SEC, Glasgow

24 July 2026
19:25

Report

Cayman Islands	5–21	Jamaica
Pts: O'Connor 3		Pts: Brown 8

SEC, Glasgow

26 July 2026
11:55

Report

Australia	21–3	Cayman Islands
Pts: Atwell 11		Pts: O'Connor 2

SEC, Glasgow

26 July 2026
19:05

Report

Kenya	22–8	Cayman Islands
Pts: Minayo, Omondi 7		Pts: Watson 3

SEC, Glasgow

== Artistic gymnastics ==
The Cayman Islands entered two artistic gymnasts (one per gender).

Men
Individual Qualification

Athlete	Event	Apparatus						Total	Rank
Athlete	Event	FL	PH	SR	VT	PB	HB	Total	Rank
Justin Spencer	All-around	11.450	10.700	10.350	10.800	11.450	10.350	65.100	24

Women
Individual Qualification

Athlete	Event	Apparatus				Total	Rank
Athlete	Event	VT	UB	BB	FL	Total	Rank
Sienna Santiago	All-around	11.250	9.100	9.900	11.250	41.500	29

== Swimming ==
The Cayman Islands swim team consisted of 10 athletes. The team was named on May 21, 2026. The final team announced in July 2026 had two women's swimmers Jillian Crooks and Lila Higgo removed from the list. The Cayman Islands swim team broke six national records during the competition.

Men

Athlete	Event	Heat		Semifinal		Final	
Athlete	Event	Time	Rank	Time	Rank	Time	Rank
James Allison	50 m freestyle	23.27	19	Did not advance			
James Allison	100 m freestyle	50.38	19	Did not advance			
James Allison	200 m freestyle	DNS		—N/a		Did not advance	
Elijah Bain	200 m freestyle	1:59.25	29	—N/a		Did not advance	
Elijah Bain	50 m butterfly	26.62	52	Did not advance			
Elijah Bain	100 m butterfly	58.50	31	Did not advance			
Elijah Bain	200 m butterfly	2:19.13	18	—N/a		Did not advance	
Elijah Bain	200 m individual medley	2:18.98	22	—N/a		Did not advance	
Luke Higgo	50 m freestyle	25.15	54	Did not advance			
Luke Higgo	50 m backstroke	27.35	22	Did not advance			
Luke Higgo	100 m backstroke	58.17	17 R	Did not advance			
Luke Higgo	200 m backstroke	2:10.13	13	—N/a		Did not advance	
Luke Higgo	200 m individual medley	2:16.24	21	—N/a		Did not advance	
Daniel Kish	50 m freestyle	23.89	31	Did not advance			
Daniel Kish	100 m freestyle	51.48	32	Did not advance			
Daniel Kish	50 m butterfly	25.33	38	Did not advance			
Daniel Kish	100 m butterfly	54.78	17 R	54.11	15	Did not advance	
Connor MacDonald	200 m freestyle	DNS		—N/a		Did not advance	
Connor MacDonald	400 m freestyle	4:09.64	19	—N/a		Did not advance	
Connor MacDonald	800 m freestyle	—N/a				8:41.32	13
Connor MacDonald	1500 m freestyle	—N/a				16:40.92	10
Will Sellars	400 m freestyle	4:20.01	20	—N/a		Did not advance	
Will Sellars	50 m backstroke	28.09	26	Did not advance			
Will Sellars	100 m backstroke	1:00.53	22	Did not advance			
Will Sellars	200 m backstroke	2:15.78	16	—N/a		Did not advance	
James Allison; Elijah Bain; Danny Kish; Connor MacDonald	4 × 100 m freestyle relay	3:26.91	8 Q	—N/a		3:26.14 NR	8
James Allison; Elijah Bain; Connor MacDonald; Will Sellars	4 × 200 m freestyle relay	7:48.64 NR	8 Q	—N/a		7:49.22	8
Luke Higgo; Danny Kish; Connor MacDonald; Will Sellars	4 × 100 m medley relay	3:59.66	12	—N/a		Did not advance	

Women

Athlete	Event	Heat		Semifinal		Final	
Athlete	Event	Time	Rank	Time	Rank	Time	Rank
Harper Barrowman	200 m freestyle	2:06.84	21	—N/a		Did not advance	
Harper Barrowman	400 m freestyle	4:27.82	21	—N/a		Did not advance	
Harper Barrowman	800 m freestyle	—N/a				9:13.72	14
Harper Barrowman	1500 m freestyle	—N/a				17:55.90	13
Sierrah Broadbelt	50 m backstroke	30.00	20	Did not advance			
Sierrah Broadbelt	100 m backstroke	1:04.92	22	Did not advance			
Sierrah Broadbelt	200 m backstroke	2:22.57	14	—N/a		Did not advance	
Sierrah Broadbelt	50 m butterfly	28.72	29	Did not advance			
Sierrah Broadbelt	100 m butterfly	1:02.59	16 Q	1:02.42	16	Did not advance	
Kyra Rabess	100 m freestyle	DNS					
Kyra Rabess	200 m freestyle	2:05.92	19	—N/a		Did not advance	
Kyra Rabess	400 m freestyle	4:19.09 NR	17	—N/a		Did not advance	
Kyra Rabess	800 m freestyle	—N/a				9:00.85	12
Kyra Rabess	1500 m freestyle	—N/a				17:12.27	9
Riley Watson	50 m backstroke	32.21	34	Did not advance			
Riley Watson	100 m backstroke	1:08.41	31	Did not advance			
Riley Watson	200 m backstroke	2:27.78	17	—N/a		Did not advance	
Riley Watson	200 m individual medley	DNS		—N/a		Did not advance	
Riley Watson	400 m individual medley	DNS		—N/a		Did not advance	
Harper Barrowman; Sierrah Broadbelt; Kyra Rabess; Riley Watson	4 × 100 m freestyle relay	3:58.11	8 Q	—N/a		3:56.61 NR	7
Harper Barrowman; Sierrah Broadbelt; Kyra Rabess; Riley Watson	4 × 200 m freestyle relay	—N/a				8:41.84	8
Harper Barrowman; Sierrah Broadbelt; Kyra Rabess; Riley Watson	4 × 100 m medley relay	DSQ		—N/a		Did not advance	

Mixed

Athlete	Event	Heat		Final	
Athlete	Event	Time	Rank	Time	Rank
James Allison; Daniel Kish; Sierrah Broadbelt; Kyra Rabess	4 × 100 m freestyle relay	3:37.90	7 Q	3:36.18 NR	6
Daniel Kish; Will Sellars; Sierrah Broadbelt; Kyra Rabess	4 × 100 m medley relay	4:09.43 NR	13	Did not advance	
