= Weightlifting at the 2026 Commonwealth Games – Women's +86 kg =

Weightlifting – Women's 86+ kg at the 2026 Commonwealth Games
- Venue: Scottish Event Campus
- Dates: 30 July 2026
- Competitors: 11 from 11 nations
- Winning total: 278 kg

Medalists
gold medal	Emily Campbell	England
silver medal	Siti Binti-Draman	Malaysia
bronze medal	Etta Love	Canada

The Women's 86+ kg weightlifting event at the 2026 Commonwealth Games took place at the SEC Armadillo, Glasgow on 30 July 2026. England's Emily Campbell won the gold medal ahead of Siti Binti-Draman from Malaysia who took silver with Etta Love of Canada claiming the bronze.

== Qualification ==
A total of 176 weightlifters (88 per gender) qualify to compete at the Games. Nations may earn one quota per weight class, allocated as follows:

- Automatic Qualification – Host CGA (1 per event)
- Direct Qualification – 2025 Commonwealth Weightlifting Champions (1 per event)
- IWF Commonwealth Ranking List (Ranking Period: 01 June 2025 – 18 May 2026) (8 per event)
- Bipartite Invitation (1 per event)

The following lifters qualified in the Women's 86+ kg class:

Means of qualification	Quotas	Qualified
Host Nation	~~1~~ 0	~~TBD (SCO)~~
2025 Commonwealth Championships	1	Iuniarra Sipaia (SAM)
IWF Commonwealth Rankings	~~8~~ 9	Emily Campbell (ENG); Tui-Alofa Patolo (NZL); Etta Love (CAN); Siti Binti-Draman (MAS); Martina Devi (IND); Mata McDonald (COK); Malia Timo (TUV); Melissa Yee (SGP)
Bipartite Invitation	1	Tenganga Taunikarawa (KIR)
Reallocated	1	Krys Campbell (JAM)
TOTAL	11	

Hosts Scotland declined their automatic entry in this weight class.

== Schedule ==
All times are British Summer Time (UTC+1)

Date	Time	Round
30 July 2026	09:00	Final

== Competition ==
Rank	Name	Country	Snatch (kg)				Clean & Jerk (kg)				Total	Notes
Rank	Name	Country	1	2	3	Result	1	2	3	Result	Total	Notes
1st place, gold medalist(s)	Emily Campbell	England	110	~~114~~	115	115	148	155	163	163 CR GR	278	GR
2nd place, silver medalist(s)	Siti Aqilah Farhana Draman	Malaysia	107	110	113	113	135	138	140	140	253	
3rd place, bronze medalist(s)	Etta Mae Love	Canada	102	106	~~109~~	106	136	140	144	144	250	
4	Tui-Alofa Patolo	New Zealand	109	112	115	115	130	~~135~~	~~136~~	130	245	
5	Martina Devi Maibam	India	~~103~~	103	105	105	140	~~144~~	~~146~~	140	245	
6	Melissa Yee	Singapore	87	91	95	95	110	115	~~120~~	115	210	
7	Mata Noko McDonald	Cook Islands	85	~~89~~	89	89	107	113	~~118~~	113	202	
8	Malia Timo	Tuvalu	84	~~89~~	~~92~~	84	107	110	~~114~~	110	194	
9	Tenganga Taunikarawa	Kiribati	81	86	~~91~~	86	99	~~105~~	105	105	191	
10	Krystal Latoya Campbell	Jamaica	73	76	~~81~~	76	98	~~100~~	100	100	176	
DNF	Iuniarra Sipaia	Samoa	~~100~~	100	~~105~~	100	~~136~~	~~136~~	—	—	—	
