= Singapore at the 2026 Commonwealth Games =

- Flag of Singapore
- CG code: SGP
- CGA: Singapore National Olympic Council
- Website: singaporeolympics.com

in Glasgow, Scotland 23 July 2026 – 2 August 2026
- Competitors: 53 in 7 sports
- Flag bearer (opening): Gan Ching Hwee
- Baton bearer: Mawjit Singh
- Flag bearer (closing): Elizabeth Liau
- Medals Ranked 28th: Gold 0 Silver 2 Bronze 0 Total 2

Commonwealth Games appearances (overview)
- 1958; 1962; 1966; 1970; 1974; 1978; 1982; 1986; 1990; 1994; 1998; 2002; 2006; 2010; 2014; 2018; 2022; 2026; 2030

Singapore competed at the 2026 Commonwealth Games in Glasgow, Scotland. This marked Singapore's 18th appearance at the Commonwealth Games after making its debut in 1958.

The Singaporean team was expected to consist of 50 athletes. However in July 2026, a final team of 53 athletes was confirmed. Para-bowls athlete Mawjit Singh and swimmer Gan Ching Hwee were the country's baton and flagbearers respectively during the opening ceremony. Track cyclist Elizabeth Liau served as the country's closing ceremony flagbearer.

Singapore ended its campaign with a medal haul of two silver medals, to rank 28th in the medal table. This marked the first time the republic failed to win a gold medal since the 1998 edition.

== Competitors ==
The following is the list of number of competitors participating at the Games per sport/discipline.

Sport	Men	Women	Total
3x3 basketball	4	4	8
Artistic gymnastics	3	5	8
Athletics	10	4	14
Bowls	3	3	6
Swimming	6	2	8
Track cycling	0	2	2
Weightlifting	4	2	6
Total	31	22	53

== Medallists ==
The following Singaporean competitors won medals at the games. In the by discipline sections below, medallists' names are bolded.

Medal	Name	Sport	Event	Date	Ref.
Silver	Amanda Yap	Gymnastics	Women's balance beam	28 July	
Silver	Wei Soong Toh	Swimming	Men's 50 m freestyle S7	29 July	

Medals by sport
**Sport**	1st place, gold medalist(s)	2nd place, silver medalist(s)	3rd place, bronze medalist(s)	**Total**
Gymnastics	0	1	0	**1**
Swimming	0	1	0	**1**
Total	0	2	0	2

Medals by date
**Day**	**Date**	1st place, gold medalist(s)	2nd place, silver medalist(s)	3rd place, bronze medalist(s)	**Total**
5	28 July	0	1	0	**1**
6	29 July	0	1	0	**1**
Total		0	2	0	2

Medals by gender
**Gender**	1st place, gold medalist(s)	2nd place, silver medalist(s)	3rd place, bronze medalist(s)	**Total**
Male	0	1	0	**1**
Female	0	1	0	**1**
Mixed / open	0	0	0	**0**
Total	0	2	0	2

== 3x3 basketball ==
Singapore qualified a men's and women's 3x3 basketball teams. This marked the country's debut in the sport at the Commonwealth Games.

Summary

Team	Event	Group stage						Play-ins	Semifinal	Final / BM / CM	
Team	Event	Opposition Score	Opposition Score	Opposition Score	Opposition Score	Opposition Score	Rank	Opposition Score	Opposition Score	Opposition Score	Rank
Singapore men	Men's tournament	Kenya; **W** 19–16	Jamaica; **L** 20–22	Malaysia; **L** 15–21	Fiji; **W** 21–7	England; **L** 13–21	3 **q**	New Zealand; **L** 15–21	Did not advance		6
Singapore women	Women's tournament	England; **L** 7–22	Papua New Guinea; **W** 21–8	Scotland; **L** 15–21	Tonga; **L** 10–14	New Zealand; **L** 16–22	5	Did not advance			9

=== Men's tournament ===
Roster
The roster consisted of four athletes.

- Xu Duanyang
- Faizal Mohamed Zahid Mohamed
- Aufa bin Emil Putra Nur
- Ching Zhen Yu

Group B

Pos	Team	Pld	W	L	PF	PA	PD	Qualification
1	England	5	5	0	105	70	+35	Direct to semi-finals
2	Malaysia	5	4	1	103	82	+21	Quarter-finals
3	Singapore	5	2	3	88	86	+2	Quarter-finals
4	Kenya	5	2	3	82	82	0	
5	Fiji	5	1	4	66	97	−31	
6	Jamaica	5	1	4	77	104	−27	

Source: Glasgow 2026
Rules for classification: 1) Wins; 2) Head-to-head record; 3) Points scored.

25 July 2026
10:00

Report

**Singapore**	**19**–16	Kenya
Pts: Nur 7		Pts: Olang 8

SEC, Glasgow

25 July 2026
14:55

Report

Singapore	20–**22**	**Jamaica**
Pts: Mohamed 10		Pts: Brown 8

SEC, Glasgow

25 July 2026
19:00

Report

Singapore	15–**21**	**Malaysia**
Pts: Ching 7		Pts: Ting 9

SEC, Glasgow

27 July 2026
11:55

Report

**Singapore**	**21**–7	Fiji
Pts: Ching 10		Pts: Sewabu 3

SEC, Glasgow

27 July 2026
17:25

Report

Singapore	13–**21**	**England**
Pts: Nur 5		Pts: Walshe 8

SEC, Glasgow

Play-in

28 July 2026
17:30

Report

**New Zealand**	**21**–15	Singapore
Pts: Tonge 7		Pts: Xu 6

SEC, Glasgow

=== Women's tournament ===
Roster
The roster consisted of four athletes.

- Lydia Ang
- Matilda Lai
- Jermaine Lim
- Han Xing Yue

Group B

Pos	Team	Pld	W	L	PF	PA	PD	Qualification
1	New Zealand	5	5	0	105	54	+51	Direct to semi-finals
2	England	5	4	1	89	45	+44	Quarter-finals
3	Tonga	5	3	2	50	72	−22	Quarter-finals
4	Scotland (H)	5	2	3	73	67	+6	
5	Singapore	5	1	4	69	85	−16	
6	Papua New Guinea	5	0	5	33	96	−63	

Source: Glasgow 2026
Rules for classification: 1) Wins; 2) Head-to-head record; 3) Points scored.
(H) Hosts

25 July 2026
10:00

Report

Singapore	7–**22**	**England**
Pts: Lim 5		Pts: Beckford-Norton 9

SEC, Glasgow

25 July 2026
14:30

Report

**Singapore**	**21**–8	Papua New Guinea
Pts: Ang, Lai 8		Pts: Asiba 5

SEC, Glasgow

25 July 2026
19:25

Report

Singapore	15–**21**	**Scotland**
Pts: Han 8		Pts: Brown 8

SEC, Glasgow

27 July 2026
11:30

Report

Singapore	10–**14**	**Tonga**
Pts: Lai 4		Pts: L Finau 6

SEC, Glasgow

27 July 2026
20:20

Report

Singapore	16–**22**	**New Zealand**
Pts: Lim 8		Pts: Pupuke-Robati 10

SEC, Glasgow

== Artistic gymnastics ==
Singapore entered eight gymnasts (three men and five women).

Men
Team Final & Individual Qualification

Athlete	Event	Apparatus						Total	Rank
Athlete	Event	FL	PH	SR	VT	PB	HB	Total	Rank
Jovi Loh	Team	11.750	12.100	11.500	12.950	12.750	11.350	72.400	15 **Q**
Asher Pua	Team	10.000	11.100	7.900	12.450	10.650	10.650	62.750	26
Abdulattif Abdul Barr	Team	—N/a				5.550	11.250	—N/a	
**Total**	Team	21.750	23.200	19.400	25.400	28.950	33.250	151.950	9

Individual Finals

Athlete	Event	Apparatus						Total	Rank
Athlete	Event	FX	PH	SR	VT	PB	HB	Total	Rank
Jovi Loh	All-around	—N/a	11.300	13.150	11.750	—N/a	—N/a	DNF	

Women
Team Final & Individual Qualification

Athlete	Event	Apparatus				Total	Rank
Athlete	Event	VT	UB	BB	FL	Total	Rank
Amanda Yap	Team	12.700	11.900	12.950 **Q**	12.500 **Q**	50.050	10 **Q**
Emma Yap	Team	~~11.850~~	~~7.500~~	~~9.900~~	12.200	41.450	30
Emma Goh	Team	—N/a	10.000	10.650	~~11.150~~	—N/a	
Alena Tan	Team	12.000	10.200	10.750	11.900	44.850	21 **Q**
Charlotte Phoon	Team	12.350	—N/a				
**Total**	Team	37.050	32.100	34.350	36.600	140.100	7

Individual Finals

Athlete	Event	Apparatus				Total	Rank
Athlete	Event	V	UB	BB	F	Total	Rank
Amanda Yap	All-around	13.000	11.450	11.950	10.900	47.300	14
Alena Tan	All-around	12.500	11.000	11.700	11.700	46.900	16

Athlete	Apparatus	Score	Rank
**Amanda Yap**	Balance beam	13.233	2nd place, silver medalist(s)
**Amanda Yap**	Floor	11.000	8

== Athletics ==
Singapore qualified fourteen athletes for the 2026 Commonwealth Games.

Key

Ranks given for track events are within the athlete's heat only.

- **Q** = Qualified for the next round
- **q** = Qualified for the next round as a fastest loser or, in field events, by position without achieving the qualifying target

Track events

Athlete	Event	Heat		Semifinal		Final	
Athlete	Event	Result	Rank	Result	Rank	Result	Rank
Marc Brian Louis	Men's 100 metres	10.38	3	Did not advance			
Marc Brian Louis	Men's 200 metres						
Harry Curran	Men's 200 metres						
Reuben Rainer Lee	Men's 200 metres						
Thiruben Thana Rajan	Men's 800 metres						
Tate Tan Fung; Xander Ho Ann Heng; Marc Brian Louis; Ian Gan Yu An; Harry Irfan Curran (reserve)	Men's 4x100 metres relay						
Shanti Pereira	Women's 100 metres	11.24	1 **q**				
Shanti Pereira	Women's 200 metres						
Shanti Pereira; Elizabeth-Ann Tan; Kerstin Ong; Amanda Loo Si Hu	Women's 4x100 metres relay						

Field events

Athlete	Event	Qualification		Final	
Athlete	Event	Distance	Rank	Distance	Rank
Kam Kampton	Men's high jump	—			
Gabriel Lee Jing Yi	Men's triple jump				
Low Jun Yu	Men's pole vault				

== Bowls ==
Singapore entered a team of six bowlers (three of each gender), including the first para bowlers to represent Singapore at the Games.

Athlete	Event	Group Stage							Semifinal	Final / BM	
Athlete	Event	Opposition Score	Opposition Score	Opposition Score	Opposition Score	Opposition Score	Opposition Score	Rank	Opposition Score	Opposition Score	Rank
Harriman Yuen	Men's singles	Rittmuller (RSA); **L** 0–2	Graham (NFK); **L** 1–1*	Kelly (NIR); **L** 0–2	Hill (TGA); **W** 2–0	McIlroy (NZL); **L** 0.5–1.5	Tafatu (NIU); **W** 2–0	5	Did not advance		
Serena Tiong	Women's singles	Bruce (NZL); **W** 2–0	Papani (NIU); **W** 2–0	Merrien (GGY); **L** 0–2	Mooketsi (BOT); **W** 1*–1	O'Neil (NIR); **L** 1–1*	—N/a	4	Did not advance		
Cheo Ai Lin; Janice Tan	Women's pairs	Northern Ireland; **L** 0–2	Niue; **W** 2–0	Australia; **L** 0–2	Isle of Man; **W** 2–0	Guernsey; **L** 0.5–1.5	Zambia; **W** 1*–1	4	Did not advance		

=== Para bowls ===
Athlete	Event	Group Stage						Semifinal	Final / BM	
Athlete	Event	Opposition Score	Opposition Score	Opposition Score	Opposition Score	Opposition Score	Rank	Opposition Score	Opposition Score	Rank
Khirmern Bin Mohamad; Mawjit Singh	Men's pairs B6–8	England; **L** 0–2	Scotland; **L** 0–2	Australia; **L** 1–1*	New Zealand; **L** 1–1*	South Africa; **L** 1–1*	6	Did not advance		

== Swimming ==
Singapore entered eight swimmers (six men and two women), including two male para swimmers.

Athlete	Event	Heat		Semifinal		Final	
Athlete	Event	Time	Rank	Time	Rank	Time	Rank
Mikkel Lee	Men's 50 m freestyle	22.63	9 **Q**	22.25	8 **Q**	22.23	8
Mikkel Lee	Men's 100 m freestyle	49.82	14 **Q**	49.74	14	Did not advance	
Mikkel Lee	Men's 50 m butterfly	23.90	10 **Q**	23.77	12	Did not advance	
Zavv Xian Le Lee	Men's 50 m freestyle	24.00	35	Did not advance			
Zavv Xian Le Lee	Men's 50 m breaststroke	28.80	25	Did not advance			
Zavv Xian Le Lee	Men's 50 m butterfly	25.85	43	Did not advance			
Russel Pang	Men's 400 m freestyle	3:57.43	13	—N/a		Did not advance	
Russel Pang	Men's 800 m freestyle	—N/a				8:13.47	10
Russel Pang	Men's 1500 m freestyle	—N/a				15:25.58	5
Teong Tzen Wei	Men's 50 m butterfly	23.80	8 **Q**	23.64	10 **R**	Did not advance	
Sarah Sim	Women's 200 m freestyle	2:09.24	26	—N/a		Did not advance	
Sarah Sim	Women's 400 m freestyle	4:29.36	22	—N/a		Did not advance	
Sarah Sim	Women's 800 m freestyle	—N/a				9:05.98	13
Sarah Sim	Women's 1500 m freestyle	—N/a				17:22.06	10
Gan Ching Hwee	Women's 400 m freestyle	4:11.10	8 **Q**	—N/a		4:09.34	5
Gan Ching Hwee	Women's 800 m freestyle	—N/a				8:33.65	6
Gan Ching Hwee	Women's 1500 m freestyle	—N/a				16:06.00	4

=== Para swimming ===
Athlete	Event	Heat		Final	
Athlete	Event	Time	Rank	Time	Rank
**Toh Wei Soong**	Men's S7 50 m Freestyle	29.44	2 **Q**	29.36	2nd place, silver medalist(s)
Zhi Wei Wong	Men's S13 50 m Freestyle	26.94	7 **Q**	26.83	7
Zhi Wei Wong	Men's S13 100 m Freestyle	59.93	6 **Q**	58.98	6

== Track cycling ==
Singapore entered two female track cyclists.

Women
Elimination race

Athlete	Event	Final
Athlete	Event	Rank
Elizabeth Liau	Elimination race	20
Valencia Tan	Elimination race	16

Points race

Athlete	Event	Final	
Athlete	Event	Points	Rank
Elizabeth Liau	Point race	20	11
Valencia Tan	Point race	2	15

Scratch race

Athlete	Event	Final
Athlete	Event	Rank
Elizabeth Liau	Scratch race	15
Valencia Tan	Scratch race	22

== Weightlifting ==
Singapore qualified six weightlifters, four men and two women.

Athlete	Event	Snatch (kg)		Clean & Jerk (kg)		Total (kg)	Rank
Athlete	Event	Result	Rank	Result	Rank	Total (kg)	Rank
Hafiz Bin Zaidi	Men's 60 kg	100	7	117	8	217	8
Kester Loy	Men's 71 kg	120	8	145	8	265	8
Yuan Yee Loh	Men's 79 kg	136	5	167	5	303	5
Lim Kang Yin	Men's 88 kg	130	9	165	8	295	7
Chua Jiin-Linn	Women's 53 kg	74	7	94	6	168	6
Melissa Yee	Women's +86 kg	95	7	115	6	210	6
