= Louise Hoskins =

Australian para bowls player

Louise Hoskins (born 10 February 1950) is an Australian para bowls player. She represented Australia at the 2026 Commonwealth Games in the bowls competition. She entered the 2026 Commonwealth Games as the oldest competitor at the age of 76.

== Biography ==
Hoskins was born on 10 February 1950, coincidingly during the time when New Zealand had hosted the 1950 British Empire Games.

== Career ==
She along with her bowls partner Serena Bonnell clinched the gold medal in the final of the Para Women’s Bowls Pairs B6-8 category at the 2026 Commonwealth Games after defeating the New Zealand pair Julie O'Connell and Teri Blacbourn. Louise Hoskins eventually became the oldest ever Commonwealth Games competitor to win a gold medal in the history of the Commonwealth Games at the age of 76. The record for the oldest ever Commonwealth Games gold medalist was previously held by George Miller of Scotland who achieved it during the 2022 Commonwealth Games in Birmingham at the age of 75.
