= Athletics at the 2026 Commonwealth Games – Women's pole vault =

Women's pole vault at the 2026 Commonwealth Games
- Venue: Scotstoun Stadium, Glasgow
- Dates: 31 July (final)
- Competitors: 7 from 5 nations
- Winning Height m: 4.65

Medalists
gold medal	Eliza McCartney	New Zealand
silver medal	Nina Kennedy	Australia
bronze medal	Imogen Ayris	New Zealand

The women's pole vault at the 2026 Commonwealth Games, as part of the athletics programme, took place at Scotstoun Stadium on 31 July 2026. It was held as a straight final.

== Records ==
Prior to this competition, the existing world, Commonwealth and Commonwealth Games records were as follows:

Women's Pole vault
World record	5.06 m	Yelena Isinbayeva (RUS)	28 Aug 2009	Letzigrund, Zürich
Commonwealth record	4.94 m	Eliza McCartney (NZL)	17 Jul 2018	Jockgrim, Germany
Games record	4.75 m	Alysha Newman (CAN)	13 April 2018	Gold Coast, Australia

== Schedule ==
The event was a straight final, and the schedule was as follows:

Date	Time	Round
31 July 2026	19:00	Final

All times are British Summer Time (UTC+1)

== Results ==
=== Final ===
The final was scheduled for the evening of 31 July 2026.

Place	Athlete	3.50	3.70	3.90	4.10	4.30	4.45	4.55	4.65	4.70	Result	Notes
1st place, gold medalist(s)	Eliza McCartney (NZL)	–	–	–	–	o	o	o	o	xxx	4.65	
2nd place, silver medalist(s)	Nina Kennedy (AUS)	–	–	–	–	–	o	o	xo	xxx	4.65	
3rd place, bronze medalist(s)	Imogen Ayris (NZL)	–	–	–	–	xxo	o	o	x–	xx	4.55	
4	Olivia McTaggart (NZL)	–	–	–	–	o	xxx				4.30	
5	Gemma Tutton (ENG)	–	–	–	o	xxx					4.10	
6	Jennifer Elizarov (CAN)	–	–	xo	o	xxx					4.10	
—	Noreen Hussain (PAK)	xxx									NM	
