= Imogen Ayris =

New Zealand pole vaulter (born 2000)

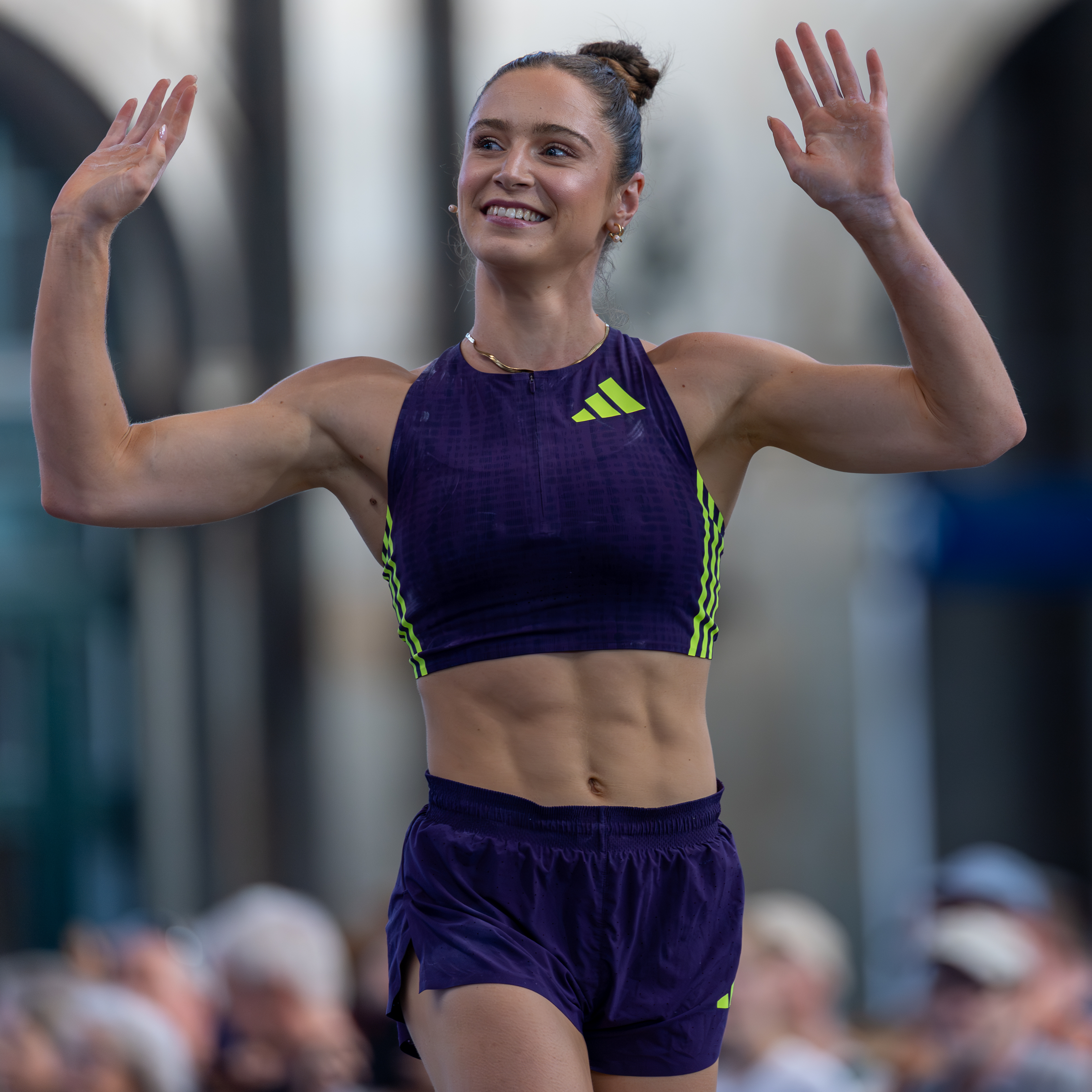
- Imogen Ayris in the Pole Vault at the Wanda Diamond League’s 2026 Weltklasse Zürich.

Personal information
- Born: Imogen Holly Ayris; 12 December 2000 (age 25) Auckland, New Zealand
- Height: 1.71 m (5 ft 7 in)

Sport
- Country: New Zealand
- Sport: Athletics
- Event: Pole vault
- Club: Takapuna Athletic and Harrier Club

Achievements and titles
- National finals: Pole vault (2018, 2020, 2021)
- Personal bests: 4.76 m i 2026; 4.81 m (outdoors) 2026
Medal record
Women's athletics
Representing New Zealand
World Indoor Championships
Bronze medal – third place	2026 Toruń	Pole vault
Commonwealth Games
Bronze medal – third place	2022 Birmingham	Pole vault
Bronze medal – third place	2026 Glasgow	Pole vault

Imogen Holly Ayris (born 12 December 2000) is a New Zealand athlete who competes in the pole vault. She won the bronze medal in the pole vault representing her country at the 2022 and 2026 Commonwealth Games.

== Biography ==
Ayris was born in Auckland on 12 December 2000, the daughter of Barny and Bridget Ayris. She was educated at Takapuna Grammar School, and studied exercise science at the University of Auckland, graduating with a Bachelor of Science degree in 2024.

Ayris began competing in athletics as a six-year-old at the Takapuna Athletic and Harrier Club, but also was a promising gymnast, representing New Zealand in an international event against Australia. She took up the pole vault when she was 13 years old, coached by Jeremy McColl. She finished third in the pole vault at the national secondary schools championships six months later, and won the national junior title at the 2015 national athletic championships. In 2016, aged 15, she became the youngest female New Zealand athlete to clear four metres. In 2018, Ayris won both the national under-20 and senior national pole vault titles, and she subsequently won the national title again in 2020 and 2021.

Ayris represented New Zealand in the pole vault at the 2018 IAAF World Under-20 Championships, finishing 19th, with a height of 3.95 m. The following year, she competed at the Athletics at the 2019 Summer Universiade, where she placed equal tenth in the pole vault, recording a height of 4.11 m. At the 2022 Commonwealth Games, Ayris cleared 4.45 m to win the bronze medal in the pole vault, despite competing with a fractured bone in her foot.

At the 2023 World Athletics Championships in Budapest, Hungary, Ayris cleared 4.50 metres but did not qualify for the final.

At the 2024 Paris Olympics, she placed twelfth overall, clearing a personal best 4.60 metres.

Ayris was a finalist at the 2025 World Athletics Championships in Tokyo, Japan, in September 2025, placing tenth overall with a clearance of 4.45 metres.

Ayris jumped a lifetime best of 4.70 metres whilst competing indoors in Caen, France, on 30 January 2026. In February, she improved to 4.76 metres at the All Star Perche, a World Athletics Indoor Tour Silver meeting, in Clermont-Ferrand, France. The following month, Ayris shared the bronze medal with Angelica Moser and Amalie Svabikova at the 2026 World Athletics Indoor Championships in Toruń, Poland. In May, she finished runner-up with a clearance of 4.70 metres in the 2026 Diamond League meeting in Rabat. Three days later, on 3 June, she set a meeting record, and personal best, of 4.81 metres to win at the Paavo Nurmi Games in Finland.
