= Daniel Morton (cyclist) =

New Zealand track cyclist (born 2006)

Personal information
- Born: 21 March 2006 (age 20)

Cycling career
- Sport: Cycling
- Discipline: Track cycling
- Role: Rider
Medal record
Men's track cycling
Representing New Zealand
Commonwealth Games
| Bronze medal – third place | 2026 Glasgow | Team pursuit |

Daniel Morton (born 21 March 2006) is a New Zealand track cyclist. He won a bronze medal in the team pursuit at the 2026 Commonwealth Games.

== Career ==
As a junior rider, Morton was a triple Oceania champion in the team pursuit, the points race and the Madison during the 2024 season. He also won the individual pursuit and the points race at the New Zealand championships. That year, he was selected for the New Zealand national team to participate in the Junior Track World Championships.

In 2025, he became the senior New Zealand Madison champion alongside Magnus Jamieson. He also won the bronze medal in the team pursuit at the 2025 Oceania Championships.

Morton was part of the new Zealand team pursuit that won a won a bronze medal in the team pursuit at the 2026 Commonwealth Games, defeating Wales in the bronze medal race.

== Personal life ==
Hs is from Auckland.
