= Swimming at the 2026 Commonwealth Games – Men's 50 metre freestyle S7 =

Men's 50 metre freestyle S7 at the 2026 Commonwealth Games
- Venue: Tollcross International Swimming Centre
- Dates: 29 July
- Competitors: 7 from 6 nations
- Winning time: 28.45 GR

Medalists
gold medal	Christian Sadie	South Africa
silver medal	Toh Wei Soong	Singapore
bronze medal	Bruce Dee	England

The men's 50 metre freestyle S7 event at the 2026 Commonwealth Games will be held on 29 July at the Tollcross International Swimming Centre.

== Schedule ==
The schedule is as follows:

All times are British Summer Time (UTC+1)

Date	Time	Round
Wednesday 29 July 2026	10:30	Heat
Wednesday 29 July 2026	19:00	Final

== Results ==
=== Heat ===
The heat was held on the morning of 29 July 2026.

Heat results
Rank	Lane	Swimmer	Nation	Time	Notes
1	4	Christian Sadie (S7)	South Africa	28.45	Q, GR
2	5	Toh Wei Soong (S7)	Singapore	29.44	Q
3	3	Bruce Dee (S6)	England	31.50	Q
4	2	Chaitanya Vishwas Kulkarni (S6)	India	32.77	Q
5	1	Muhammad Nur Syaiful Zulkafli (S6)	Malaysia	35.05	Q
6	6	Suyash Jadhav (S7)	India	35.35	Q
7	7	Sebastian Massabie (S5)	Canada	36.09	Q

=== Final ===
The final will take place during of the evening of 29 July 2026.

Final results
Rank	Lane	Swimmer	Nation	Time	Notes
1st place, gold medalist(s)	4	Christian Sadie	South Africa	28.06	GR
2nd place, silver medalist(s)	5	Wei Soong Toh	Singapore	29.36	
3rd place, bronze medalist(s)	3	Bruce Dee	England	31.33	
4	7	Suyash Jadhav	India	31.63	
5	6	Chaitanya Kulkarni	India	33.17	
6	2	Nur Syalful Zulkafli	Malaysia	34.62	
7	1	Sebastian Massabie	Canada	35.26	
