= Teri Blackbourn =

New Zealand lawn bowler

Personal information
- Born: 8 April 1994 (age 32) Christchurch, New Zealand

Sport
- Country: New Zealand
- Sport: Lawn bowls
Medal record
Para-sport lawn bowls
Representing New Zealand
World Bowls Championship
Gold medal – first place	2023 Gold Coast	Para women’s pairs
Commonwealth Games
Silver medal – second place	2026 Glasgow	Women's pairs B6–8

Teri Blackbourn (born 8 April 1994) is a New Zealand international lawn bowler.

Blackbourn competed in the inaugural Para women’s pairs event at the 2023 World Bowls Championship where she won the gold medal with teammate Julie O'Connell.

In the Women's pairs B6–8 event at the 2026 Commonwealth Games, Blackbourn and O'Connell secured the silver medal.
