= Bruce Dee =

British Paralympic swimmer (born 2006)

Personal information
- Nationality: British
- Born: 20 December 2006 (age 19) Kettering, Northamptonshire, England

Sport
- Sport: Para swimming
- Disability class: S6
Medal record
Men's paralympic swimming
Representing United Kingdom
World Championships
Silver medal – second place	2025 Singapore	Mixed 4×100 m medley relay 34pts
European Championships
Silver medal – second place	2024 Funchal	200 m ind. medley SM6
Representing England
Commonwealth Games
Bronze medal – third place	2026 Glasgow	50 m freestyle S7

Bruce Dee (born 20 December 2006) is an English Paralympic swimmer who competes in the S6 classification. He won a silver medal at the 2025 World Para Swimming Championships and the 2024 World Para Swimming European Open Championships. He also represented Great Britain at the 2024 Summer Paralympics.

== Early life ==
Bruce Dee was born on 20 December 2006, in Kettering, Northamptonshire, England and has dwarfism.

== Career ==
In April 2024, Dee competed at the 2024 World Para Swimming European Open Championships, where he won the silver medal in the 200 metre individual medley SM6 event. Several months later, he was selected to represent Great Britain at the 2024 Summer Paralympics, where he finished in fifth place in the 100 m breaststroke SB6 and fourth place in the 200 m individual medley SM6.

In August 2025, Dee was named to the British para swimming team for the 2025 World Para Swimming Championships held in Singapore. The following month, he was part of the team that won the silver medal in the mixed 4×100 m medley relay 34pts event.
