= Swimming at the 2026 Commonwealth Games – Women's 200 metre freestyle =

Women's 200 metre freestyle at the 2026 Commonwealth Games
- Venue: Tollcross International Swimming Centre
- Dates: 25 July
- Winning time: 1:54.66

Medalists
gold medal	Mollie O'Callaghan	Australia
silver medal	Lani Pallister	Australia
bronze medal	Erika Fairweather	New Zealand

The women's 200 metre freestyle event at the 2026 Commonwealth Games will be held on 25 July at the Tollcross International Swimming Centre.

== Schedule ==
The schedule is as follows:

All times are British Summer Time (UTC+1)

Date	Time	Round
Saturday 25 July 2026	10:30	Heats
Saturday 25 July 2026	19:00	Final

== Results ==
=== Heats ===
The heats will be held on the morning of 25 July 2026.

Heat results
Rank	Heat	Lane	Swimmer	Nation	Time	Notes
1	4	4	Lani Pallister	Australia	1:57.02	Q
2	4	5	Inez Miller	Australia	1:57.45	Q
3	3	4	Freya Colbert	England	1:58.18	Q
4	5	4	Mollie O'Callaghan	Australia	1:58.22	Q
5	5	5	Erika Fairweather	New Zealand	1:58.39	Q
6	3	5	Freya Anderson	England	1:58.47	Q
7	4	3	Leah Schlosshan	England	1:58.75	Q
8	5	3	Ella Jansen	Canada	1:59.16	Q
9	3	2	Joanna Evans	Bahamas	1:59.81	R
10	3	6	Julie Brousseau	Canada	2:00.71	R
11	3	3	Dune Coetzee	South Africa	2:00.90	
12	4	6	Megan Barnes	Scotland	2:01.79	
13	4	7	Alexandra Bastone	Wales	2:02.15	
14	5	7	Victoria Catterson	Northern Ireland	2:02.73	
15	4	2	Georgia Nel	South Africa	2:02.763	
16	5	2	Hannah Robertson	South Africa	2:03.31	
17	5	1	Emily Hughes	Northern Ireland	2:03.35	
18	3	7	Sophie Davies	Wales	2:04.51	
19	3	1	Kyra Rabess	Cayman Islands	2:05.92	
20	3	8	Tilly Collymore	Grenada	2:06.23	
21	2	4	Harper Barrowman	Cayman Islands	2:06.84	
22	4	1	Gloria Muzito	Uganda	2:07.68	
23	2	7	Clara Ginnis	Jersey	2:08.15	
24	4	8	Nafanua Hamilton	Samoa	2:08.34	
25	2	5	Kiera Prentice	Isle of Man	2:08.76	
26	5	8	Sarah Sim	Singapore	2:09.24	
27	2	3	Lauren Dennett	Isle of Man	2:09.54	
28	2	1	Delphine Riley	Guernsey	2:11.01	
29	2	6	Jehanara Nabi	Pakistan	2:11.16	
30	2	2	Elodie Riley	Guernsey	2:11.68	
31	1	4	Toria Alleyne	Barbados	2:14.75	
32	1	3	Katie Green	Gibraltar	2:17.14	
33	2	8	Davia Richardson	Belize	2:17.66	
34	1	2	Hayley Hoy	Eswatini	2:18.87	
35	1	6	Jasmine Schofield	Dominica	2:19.61	
36	1	5	Meral Ayn Latheef	Maldives	2:25.08	NR
	5	6	Grace Davison	Northern Ireland		DNS

=== Final ===
The final took place during of the evening of 25 July 2026.

Final results
Rank	Lane	Swimmer	Nation	Time	Notes
1st place, gold medalist(s)	6	Mollie O'Callaghan	Australia	1:54.66	
2nd place, silver medalist(s)	4	Lani Pallister	Australia	1:55.01	
3rd place, bronze medalist(s)	2	Erika Fairweather	New Zealand	1:55.24	
4	3	Freya Colbert	England	1:55.74	
5	5	Inez Miller	Australia	1:56.27	
6	1	Leah Schlosshan	England	1:58.11	
7	7	Freya Anderson	England	1:59.11	
8	8	Ella Jansen	Canada	1:59.18	
