= Swimming at the 2026 Commonwealth Games – Men's 200 metre individual medley =

Men's 200 metre individual medley at the 2026 Commonwealth Games
- Venue: Tollcross International Swimming Centre
- Dates: 24 July
- Competitors: 22 from 15 nations
- Winning time: 1:56.38

Medalists
| gold medal | Duncan Scott | Scotland |
| silver medal | Lewis Clareburt | New Zealand |
| bronze medal | Tom Dean | England |

The men's 200 metre individual medley event at the 2026 Commonwealth Games was held on 24 July at the Tollcross International Swimming Centre.

== Schedule ==
The schedule is as follows:

All times are British Summer Time (UTC+1)

| Date | Time | Round |
|---|---|---|
| Friday 24 July 2026 | 10:55 | Heats |
| Friday 24 July 2026 | 19:16 | Final |

== Results ==
=== Heats ===
The heats were held at 10:55 on 24 July 2026.

Heat results
| Rank | Heat | Lane | Swimmer | Nation | Time | Notes |
|---|---|---|---|---|---|---|
| 1 | 2 | 4 | William Petric | Australia | 1:58.70 | Q |
| 2 | 1 | 5 | Tom Dean | England | 1:58.75 | Q |
| 2 | 2 | 5 | Max Litchfield | England | 1:58.75 | Q |
| 4 | 1 | 4 | Lewis Clareburt | New Zealand | 1:58.79 | Q |
| 5 | 3 | 4 | Duncan Scott | Scotland | 1:58.81 | Q |
| 6 | 2 | 3 | Brendon Smith | Australia | 1:59.02 | Q |
| 7 | 3 | 5 | Evan Jones | Scotland | 1:59.04 | Q |
| 8 | 1 | 3 | Lorne Wigginton | Canada | 1:59.09 | Q |
| 9 | 3 | 3 | Matthew Ward | Scotland | 1:59.59 | R |
| 10 | 3 | 6 | Oliver Durand | Namibia | 2:03.09 | R |
| 11 | 3 | 1 | Kris Mihaylov | South Africa | 2:03.57 | |
| 12 | 3 | 8 | Tan Khai Xin | Malaysia | 2:06.20 | |
| 13 | 2 | 6 | Isaac Dodds | Jersey | 2:06.65 | |
| 14 | 1 | 7 | Elijah Daley | Bermuda | 2:06.82 | |
| 15 | 1 | 6 | Sam Williamson | Bermuda | 2:06.92 | |
| 16 | 3 | 2 | Oscar Dodds | Jersey | 2:09.20 | |
| 17 | 2 | 1 | Muhammad Ahmed Durrani | Pakistan | 2:09.79 | |
| 18 | 2 | 2 | Carter Makira | Cook Islands | 2:12.60 | |
| 19 | 1 | 1 | Clinton Opute | Nigeria | 2:15.40 | |
| 20 | 3 | 7 | Christian Toia | Samoa | 2:16.08 | |
| 21 | 1 | 2 | Luke Higgo | Cayman Islands | 2:16.24 | |
| 22 | 2 | 7 | Elijah Bain | Cayman Islands | 2:18.98 | |

=== Final ===
The final was held at 19:16 on 24 July 2026.

Final results
| Rank | Lane | Swimmer | Nation | Time | Notes |
|---|---|---|---|---|---|
| 1st place, gold medalist(s) | 2 | Duncan Scott | Scotland | 1:56.38 | GR |
| 2nd place, silver medalist(s) | 6 | Lewis Clareburt | New Zealand | 1:56.77 | NR |
| 3rd place, bronze medalist(s) | 3 | Tom Dean | England | 1:57.22 | |
| 4 | 4 | William Petric | Australia | 1:57.87 | |
| 5 | 5 | Max Litchfield | England | 1:58.62 | |
| 6 | 8 | Lorne Wigginton | Canada | 1:58.66 | |
| 7 | 1 | Evan Jones | Scotland | 1:58.74 | |
| 8 | 7 | Brendon Smith | Australia | 1:59.01 | |
