= Caitlin Deans =

New Zealand swimmer

Personal information
- Born: 5 December 1999 (age 26) Dunedin, New Zealand
- Height: 1.70 m (5 ft 7 in)

Sport
- Country: New Zealand
- Sport: Swimming
- Strokes: Freestyle
- Club: Neptune Swim Club
- Coach: Lars Humer
Medal record
Women's swimming
Representing New Zealand
Commonwealth Games
Bronze medal – third place	2026 Glasgow	4 × 200 m freestyle relay
Oceania Championships
Gold medal – first place	2018 Port Moresby	4 × 100 m mixed freestyle
Silver medal – second place	2018 Port Moresby	4 × 100 m freestyle relay
Silver medal – second place	2018 Port Moresby	4 × 200 m freestyle relay
Silver medal – second place	2018 Port Moresby	200 m backstroke
Bronze medal – third place	2018 Port Moresby	400 m freestyle
Bronze medal – third place	2018 Port Moresby	200 m freestyle

Caitlin Deans (born 5 December 1999) is a New Zealand swimmer who competed at the 2024 Summer Olympics.

Deans was born in Dunedin and attended Columba College in Dunedin before graduating from the University of Otago in Physiology.

== Swimming career ==
Competing as an 18 year old, Deans claimed three individual medals and three relay medals at the 2018 Oceania Games in Port Moresby, Papua New Guinea.

Later in 2018, she finished 15th in the 800 metre freestyle event at the 2018 FINA World Swimming Championships (25 m), in Hangzhou, China.

At the 2022 World Aquatics Championships, Deans finished 13th in the 1500 metre freestyle and 7th in the final as part of the 4x200 metre freestyle relay.

At the 2022 FINA World Swimming Championships (25 m), she finished 5th in the 1500 metre freestyle, 19th in the 200 metre freestyle and 8th in the 4x200 metre freestyle relay.

In 2023 Deans finished 16th in the 1500 metre freestyle and 11th in the 4x200 metre freestyle relay at the 2023 World Aquatics Championships. Deans also won a bronze medal at the Athens stop of the World Aquatics Swimming World Cup behind Lani Pallister and Katie Grimes.

In 2024, at the 2024 World Aquatics Championships in Doha, Deans finished 10th in the 1500 metre freestyle and fifth in the 4x200 metre freestyle relay.

Later the same year, at the 2024 Summer Olympics, Deans was a member of the New Zealand 4x200 Freestyle Relay team, alongside Erika Fairweather, Eve Thomas and Laticia-Leigh Transom. After clocking 7:54.37 in the heats, the team finished eighth in the final.
