= Julie O'Connell =

New Zealand lawn bowler

Personal information
- Born: 3 July 1959 (age 67) Lumsden, New Zealand

Sport
- Country: New Zealand
- Sport: Lawn bowls
Medal record
Para-sport lawn bowls
Representing New Zealand
World Bowls Championship
Gold medal – first place	2023 Gold Coast	Para women’s pairs
Commonwealth Games
Silver medal – second place	2026 Glasgow	Women's pairs B6–8

Julie Anne O'Connell (born 3 July 1959) is a New Zealand international lawn bowler.

O'Connell competed in the inaugural Para women’s pairs event at the 2023 World Bowls Championship where she won the gold medal with teammate Teri Blackbourn.

In the Women's pairs B6–8 event at the 2026 Commonwealth Games, O'Connell and Blackbourn secured the silver medal.
