= Jessie Hodges =

New Zealand cyclist and para-cycling tandem pilot

Personal information
- Born: 19 October 1996 (age 30) Hamilton, New Zealand
- Height: 1.71 m (5 ft 7 in)

Sport
- Country: New Zealand
- Sport: Cycling
- Events: Madison, points race, omnium, pursuit, tandem cycling
Medal record
Women's para-cycling
Representing New Zealand
Track World Championships
Gold medal – first place	2026 Apeldoorn	1 km time trial B
Gold medal – first place	2026 Apeldoorn	Individual pursuit B
Silver medal – second place	2025 Rio de Janeiro	Individual pursuit B
Silver medal – second place	2025 Rio de Janeiro	1 km time trial B

Jessie Hodges (born 19 October 1996) is a New Zealand track cyclist, Olympian and para-cycling tandem pilot. A multiple New Zealand national champion and Oceania champion, she represented New Zealand at the 2020 Summer Olympics in the women's Madison. After retiring from elite track cycling, Hodges returned to international competition as the sighted pilot for New Zealand para-cyclist Emma Foy. The pair won two silver medals at the 2025 UCI Para-cycling Track World Championships and two gold medals representing New Zealand at the 2026 Commonwealth Games.

== Early life and introduction to cycling ==
Hodges was born in Hamilton, New Zealand, and is from the Waikato region. She initially played netball before suffering a torn anterior cruciate ligament that required a year away from competition. Hodges began riding a bicycle as part of her rehabilitation and developed an interest in cycling during her recovery.

Hodges competed at her first New Zealand Track Cycling Nationals in 2016. She continued to progress on the track and won silver in the women's Madison at the New Zealand Track Cycling Nationals in 2017.

== Track cycling career ==
=== National and Oceania championships ===
Hodges emerged as one of New Zealand's leading endurance track cyclists in the late 2010s. In 2018, she won New Zealand national titles in the Madison, points race and individual pursuit. She defended her Madison title in 2019 and also won the national team pursuit title that year.

The 2019–20 season saw Hodges win her first Oceania title as part of the New Zealand women's team pursuit squad. She also won silver medals in the Madison and points race at the Oceania Track Championships.

At the 2020 New Zealand Track Cycling Nationals, Hodges won five gold medals from five events, claiming national titles in the scratch race, points race, omnium, Madison and team pursuit.

In 2021, Hodges finished runner-up to Ally Wollaston in the New Zealand national championship omnium.

Hodges also won a further New Zealand Madison title alongside Wollaston.

=== UCI Track Cycling World Cup ===
Hodges collected four UCI Track Cycling World Cup medals during her rise on the international stage.

At the Cambridge round of the 2018–19 UCI Track Cycling World Cup in January 2019, Hodges won bronze in the women's scratch race.

Later that year, at the Hong Kong round of the 2019–20 UCI Track Cycling World Cup, Hodges was part of the New Zealand women's team pursuit squad that won gold and partnered Nicole Shields to win silver in the women's Madison.

At the Cambridge World Cup in December 2019, Hodges partnered Michaela Drummond to win bronze in the women's Madison.

=== UCI Track Nations Cup ===
Following her return from injury, Hodges rejoined New Zealand's international endurance track programme for the 2023 season.

At the 2023 UCI Track Cycling Nations Cup in Cairo, Egypt, Hodges was part of the New Zealand women's team pursuit squad that won the silver medal.

The Cairo result formed part of New Zealand's international qualification campaign ahead of the 2023 UCI Cycling World Championships and the Paris 2024 Olympic qualification period.

Hodges subsequently retired from elite track cycling before returning to high-performance competition as a tandem pilot in para-cycling.

== Olympic Games ==
Hodges was selected to represent New Zealand at the delayed 2020 Summer Olympics in Tokyo. She was named for the women's Madison and as a reserve for both the women's omnium and team pursuit.

Hodges competed in the two-rider Madison alongside Rushlee Buchanan, with the New Zealand pair finishing 11th of 15 teams.

== Para-cycling career ==
=== Partnership with Emma Foy ===
In 2025, Hodges returned to high-performance cycling as the sighted tandem pilot for New Zealand para-cyclist Emma Foy. Foy, a six-time world champion and Paralympic medallist, was returning to para-cycling after a four-year break from the sport.

Foy and Hodges formed a new tandem partnership during 2025 and were selected to compete in the women's tandem 1 km time trial, sprint and 4 km individual pursuit at the 2025 UCI Para-cycling Track World Championships in Rio de Janeiro, Brazil.

=== 2025 UCI Para-cycling Track World Championships ===
At the 2025 UCI Para-cycling Track World Championships, Foy and Hodges won the silver medal in the women's B 4 km individual pursuit. In qualifying, the New Zealand tandem broke their own world record to advance to the gold-medal final.

They faced British Paralympic champions Sophie Unwin and Jenny Holl in the final. Foy and Hodges led for much of the pursuit before the British tandem took the lead with two laps remaining and won the world title.

Foy and Hodges won a second silver medal in the women's B 1 km time trial. The New Zealand tandem recorded a time of 1:07.228, finishing behind reigning world and Paralympic champions Elizabeth Jordan and Dannielle Khan of Great Britain, who won in 1:06.796.

The championships were Foy and Hodges' first world championships as a tandem pairing. Cycling New Zealand Para lead coach Brendon Cameron highlighted the partnership's podium performances against the reigning Paralympic champions following a short preparation period.

== 2026 season ==
In February 2026, Foy and Hodges competed in the women's BVI tandem time trial at the New Zealand Road Cycling Championships. They won the classification in a time of 40:57.56.

Later that month, Foy and Hodges competed at the 2026 Oceania Track Championships. They reached the women's Para B tandem sprint final, where they were defeated in two rides by the Australian pairing of Jessica Gallagher and pilot Jacqui Mengler-Mohr.

== 2026 Commonwealth Games ==
In June 2026, Hodges was selected as Foy's pilot for the 2026 Commonwealth Games in Glasgow, Scotland.

The Games are Hodges' first Commonwealth Games and her second major multi-sport Games representing New Zealand, following the Tokyo Olympics. Foy and Hodges were selected to compete in the women's Tandem B sprint and Tandem B 1 km time trial.

Their selection was part of New Zealand's first combined Commonwealth Games track cycling team to include para-cyclists. Competing at the Games in Scotland, Foy and Hodges won gold medals in the tandem sprint and the 1000m time trial.

== Major results ==
=== Track ===
2017

New Zealand Track Cycling Nationals

(silver) 2nd Madison

2018

New Zealand Track Cycling Nationals

(gold) 1st Madison
(gold) 1st Points race
(gold) 1st Individual pursuit

2019

UCI Track Cycling World Cup, Cambridge (January)

(bronze) 3rd Scratch race

New Zealand Track Cycling Nationals

(gold) 1st Madison
(gold) 1st Team pursuit

UCI Track Cycling World Cup, Hong Kong

(gold) 1st Team pursuit
(silver) 2nd Madison

UCI Track Cycling World Cup, Cambridge (December)

(bronze) 3rd Madison

2020

Oceania Track Championships

(gold) 1st Team pursuit
(silver) 2nd Madison
(silver) 2nd Points race

New Zealand Track Cycling Nationals

(gold) 1st Scratch race
(gold) 1st Points race
(gold) 1st Omnium
(gold) 1st Madison
(gold) 1st Team pursuit

2021

New Zealand Track Cycling Nationals

(gold) 1st Madison
(silver) 2nd Omnium

Olympic Games

11th Madison

2023

UCI Track Cycling Nations Cup, Cairo

(silver) 2nd Team pursuit

=== Para-cycling ===
2025

UCI Para-cycling Track World Championships

(silver) 2nd Women's B 4 km individual pursuit
(silver) 2nd Women's B 1 km time trial

2026

New Zealand Road Cycling Championships

(gold) 1st Women's BVI tandem time trial

Oceania Track Championships

(silver) 2nd Women's Para B tandem sprint

2026 Commonwealth Games

(gold) 1st Cycling - Track (1000m Time Trial Para-Sport B Tandem - Women)
