= Erika Fairweather =

New Zealand swimmer (born 2003)

Personal information
- Full name: Erika Jane Fairweather
- Born: 31 December 2003 (age 22) Dunedin, New Zealand
- Height: 1.70 m (5 ft 7 in)
- Weight: 59 kg (130 lb)

Sport
- Country: New Zealand
- Sport: Swimming
- Strokes: Freestyle
Medal record
Women's swimming
Representing New Zealand
Event	1st	2nd	3rd
World Championships (LC)	1	1	2
World Championships (SC)	0	2	0
Commonwealth Games	0	3	2
Pan Pacific Championships	0	0	3
World Junior Championships	1	0	0
Total	2	6	7
World Championships (LC)
Gold medal – first place	2024 Doha	400 m freestyle
Silver medal – second place	2024 Doha	200 m freestyle
Bronze medal – third place	2023 Fukuoka	400 m freestyle
Bronze medal – third place	2024 Doha	800 m freestyle
World Championships (SC)
Silver medal – second place	2022 Melbourne	400 m freestyle
Silver medal – second place	2022 Melbourne	800 m freestyle
Commonwealth Games
Silver medal – second place	2026 Glasgow	400 m freestyle
Silver medal – second place	2026 Glasgow	800 m freestyle
Silver medal – second place	2026 Glasgow	1500 m freestyle
Bronze medal – third place	2026 Glasgow	200 m freestyle
Bronze medal – third place	2026 Glasgow	4×200 m freestyle
Pan Pacific Championships
Bronze medal – third place	2026 Irvine	200 m freestyle
Bronze medal – third place	2026 Irvine	400 m freestyle
Bronze medal – third place	2026 Irvine	800 m freestyle
World Junior Championships
Gold medal – first place	2019 Budapest	200 m freestyle

Erika Jane Fairweather (born 31 December 2003) is a New Zealand swimmer who competed at the 2019 World Aquatics Championships and the 2020 Summer Olympics.

== Early life ==
Fairweather was born in Dunedin, She is of mixed European and Māori descent, affiliating with Ngāi Tahu iwi. She attended Kavanagh College and was head girl in 2021.

== Career ==
In 2018 she competed at both the 2018 Summer Youth Olympics and the 2018 Junior Pan Pacific Games. In August 2019, Fairweather won the gold medal in the 200 metres freestyle at the World Junior Swimming Championships in Budapest, Hungary, breaking her own New Zealand age-group record with a time of 1:57.96. She finished fourth in the final of the 400 metres, again breaking her own national age-group record with a time of 4:08.78.

At the 2020 Tokyo Olympics, Fairweather finished second in her heat of the 400 metres freestyle, breaking the New Zealand record (set by Lauren Boyle in 2012), with a time of 4:02.28.

At the 2023 World Aquatics Championships she finished third in the 400m freestyle in the 'race of the century', breaking her New Zealand record with a time of 3:59.59.

At the 2024 World Aquatics Championships she finished first in the 400m freestyle, breaking her New Zealand record with a time of 3:59.44 and becoming New Zealand's first ever world champion at the World Aquatics Championships.

Awards
Preceded by Alice Robinson	Halberg Awards – Emerging Talent Award; 2021	Succeeded by Gustav Legnavsky
