= Emma Foy =

New Zealand para-cyclist

Personal information
- Born: 6 April 1989 (age 37) Dargaville, New Zealand

Sport
- Country: New Zealand
- Sport: Cycling
- Disability class: B/VI
- Partners: Gabrielle Vermunt (2013); Laura Thompson (2014–16); Hannah Van Kampen (2019)
Medal record
Women's para cycling
Representing New Zealand
Paralympic Games
Silver medal – second place	2016 Rio de Janeiro	Individual pursuit B
Bronze medal – third place	2016 Rio de Janeiro	Road race B
Track World Championships
Gold medal – first place	2014 Aguascalientes	Ind. pursuit B
Gold medal – first place	2015 Apeldoorn	Ind. pursuit B
Gold medal – first place	2016 Montichiari	Ind. pursuit B
Gold medal – first place	2019 Apeldoorn	Ind. pursuit B
Gold medal – first place	2020 Milton	Ind. pursuit B
Gold medal – first place	2026 Apeldoorn	Time trial B
Gold medal – first place	2026 Apeldoorn	Ind. pursuit B
Silver medal – second place	2025 Rio de Janeiro	Ind. pursuit B
Silver medal – second place	2025 Rio de Janeiro	Time trial B
Bronze medal – third place	2014 Aguascalientes	Sprint B
Bronze medal – third place	2015 Apeldoorn	1 km Time Trial B
Bronze medal – third place	2019 Apeldoorn	1 km Time Trial Tandem
Bronze medal – third place	2020 Milton	1 km Time Trial Tandem
Road World Championships
Gold medal – first place	2019 Emmen	Ind. Road Race Tandem
Silver medal – second place	2014 Greenville	Ind. Time Trial B
Silver medal – second place	2015 Nottwil	Ind. Road Race B
Silver medal – second place	2015 Nottwil	Ind. Time Trial B
Silver medal – second place	2019 Emmen	Ind. Time Trial Tandem
Bronze medal – third place	2013 Baie-Comeau	Ind. Time Trial B
Commonwealth Games
Gold medal – first place	2026 Glasgow	Time trial B

Emma Foy (born 6 April 1989) is a New Zealand para-cyclist. She represented New Zealand at the 2016 Summer Paralympics in Rio de Janeiro, where she won a silver and a bronze medal with sighted pilot Laura Thompson.

== Career ==
From 2013 to 2019, she won a total of thirteen medals (including five gold) at the UCI Para-cycling Track and Road Championships.

In 2020, with sighted pilot Hannah van Kampen, Foy retained the world title in the women's individual pursuit tandem at the UCI Para-cycling Track World Championships. They also claimed the bronze medal in the women's time trail tandem.

Foy was born with oculocutaneous albinism. Of Māori descent, she affiliates to the Ngāpuhi iwi.
