= Eve Thomas =

New Zealand swimmer (born 2001)

Personal information
- Born: 9 February 2001 (age 25) Southend-on-Sea, Essex, England
- Relative: Sarah Hardcastle (mother)

Sport
- Country: New Zealand
- Sport: Swimming
- Club: Coast Swim Club
- Coached by: Michael Weston
Medal record
Women's swimming
Representing New Zealand
Commonwealth Games
| Bronze medal – third place | 2026 Glasgow | 4 × 200 m freestyle relay |

Eve Thomas (born 9 February 2001) is a representative swimmer from New Zealand. She competed for New Zealand in the women's 800 metre freestyle at the 2019 World Aquatics Championships.

At the 2022 Commonwealth Games, in Birmingham, England, Thomas placed fourth in the 800 metre freestyle behind three Australians, including Ariarne Titmus, with whom Thomas shares a coach, Dean Boxall. In the final of the 400 metre freestyle, she finished sixth in a time of 4:09.73.

== Personal life ==
Thomas was born in England to a Welsh father and English mother, and moved to New Zealanda at the age of 3. Sheis the daughter of British swimmer Sarah Hardcastle.
