= 2021 Australian Swimming Trials =

Swimming event in Australia

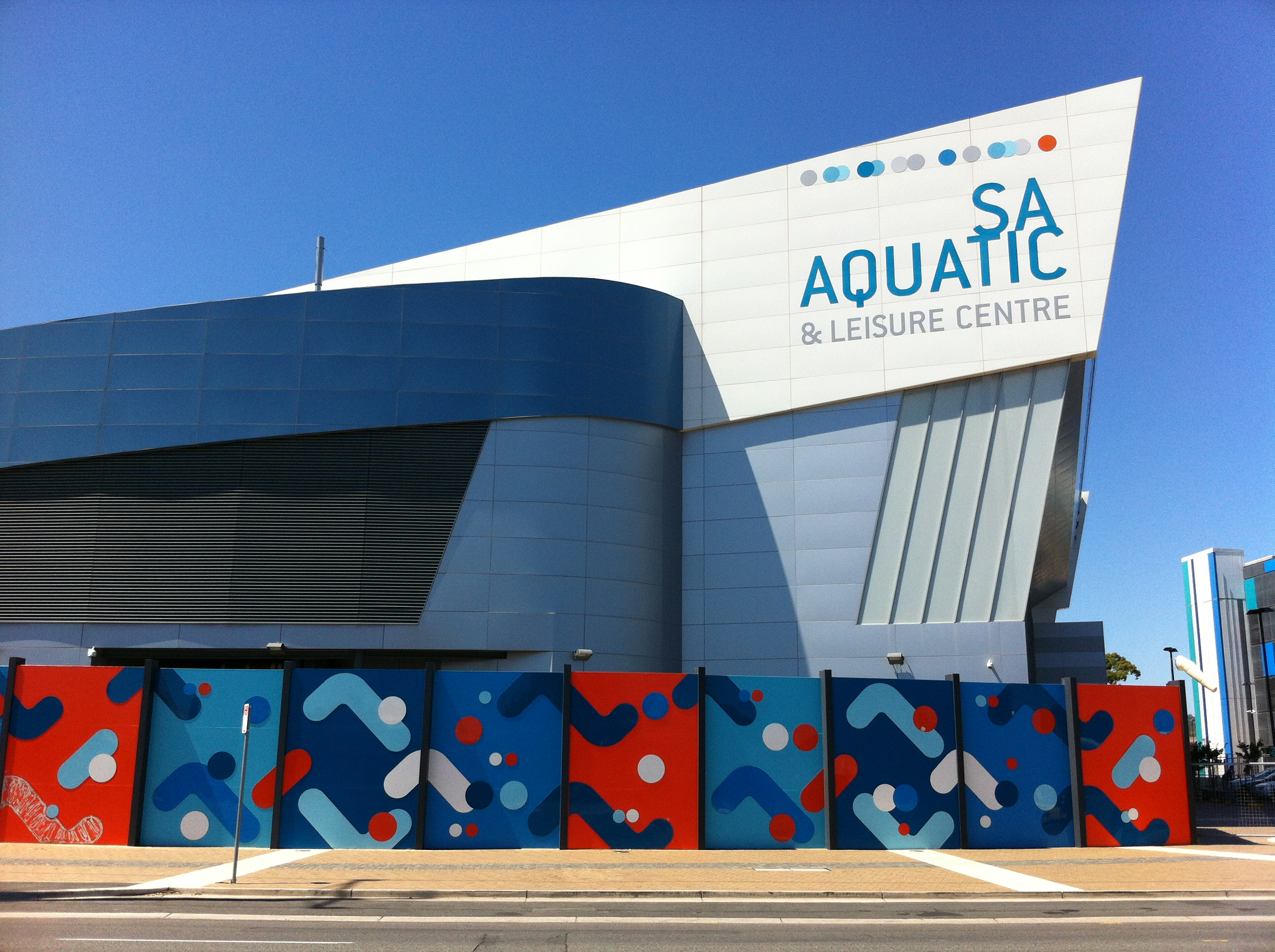
- Host city: Adelaide, South Australia
- Date: June 12 – 17, 2021
- Venue: South Australia Aquatic and Leisure Centre

The 2021 Australian Swimming Trials was a sports event that was held from 12 to 17 June 2021 at the South Australia Aquatic and Leisure Centre to determine Australia's swimming team to the 2020 Summer Olympics and 2020 Paralympics.

== Olympic Qualification criteria ==
Australia can select a maximum of 56 swimmers (26 of each sex, with up to 18 for relay only swimmers) for the Olympic team. To qualify, a swimmer must reach the allotted Olympic Qualifying Time (OQT) and finish in the top 2 positions in the "A" final. Following the end of the qualification period, FINA will assess the number of athletes having achieved the OQT, the number of relay-only swimmers, and the number of Universality places, before inviting athletes with OST to fulfil the total quota of 878. Additionally, OST places will be distributed by event according to the position of the FINA World Rankings during the qualifying deadline.

=== Olympic Qualifying Times ===
Men's events				Women's events			
Event	Trials OQT	FINA A-Cut	FINA OST	Event	Trials OQT	FINA A-Cut	FINA OST
50 m freestyle	21.77	22.01	22.67	50 m freestyle	24.46	24.77	25.51
100 m freestyle	48.33	48.57	50.03	100 m freestyle	53.31	54.38	56.01
200 m freestyle	1:45.76	1:47.02	1:50.23	200 m freestyle	1:56.82	1:57.28	2:00.80
400 m freestyle	3:46.34	3:46.78	3:53.58	400 m freestyle	4:07.10	4:07.90	4:15.34
800 m freestyle	7:48.12	7:54.31	8:08.54	800 m freestyle	8:29.70	8:33.36	8:48.76
1500 m freestyle	14:55.06	15:00.99	15:28.02	1500 m freestyle	16:02.75	16:32.04	17:01.80
100 m backstroke	53.40	53.85	55.47	100 m backstroke	59.71	1:00.25	1:02.06
200 m backstroke	1:57.26	1:57.50	2:01.03	200 m backstroke	2:09.40	2:10.39	2:14.30
100 m breaststroke	59.21	59.93	1:01.73	100 m breaststroke	1:06.97	1:07.07	1:09.08
200 m breaststroke	2:08.28	2:10.35	2:14.26	200 m breaststroke	2:24.18	2:25.52	2:29.89
100 m butterfly	51.70	51.96	53.52	100 m butterfly	57.10	57.92	59.66
200 m butterfly	1:56.25	1:56.48	1:59.97	200 m butterfly	2:08.43	2:12.28	2:08.43
200 m individual medley	1:57.98	1:59.67	2:03.26	200 m individual medley	2:10.49	2:12.56	2:16.54
400 m individual medley	4:15.24	4:15.84	4:21.46	400 m individual medley	4:38.53	4:38.53	4:46.89

- Information retrieved from Swimming Australia. and from Swimming at the 2020 Summer Olympics – Qualification.

== Paralympic Qualification criteria ==
Qualification requirements to be included in the Paralympic team is decided upon different classifications based on the degree of impairment an athlete experiences relative to an able-bodied swimmer's speed and performance. The three impairment groups at the Paralympic Games for swimming are physical, vision and intellectual. In addition, strokes and events are classified under "sport classes" that have a prefix letter and number. At the 2021 trials, qualification is selected based on a points system rather than time. Swimmers earn points based on how close they are to the world record in their respective qualification. This system is called the Multi-Class Point Score.

=== Event key ===
There are three swimming sport class prefixes for swimming strokes:

- S is for freestyle, butterfly and backstroke events.
- SB is for breaststroke
- SM is for individual medley events.

As well as swimming strokes, they are also divided into ten different categories:

- S1/SB1: swimmers who may have tetraplegia or some form of loss of muscular power in their legs, arms and hands. These swimmers would regularly use a wheelchair.
- S2/SB1: swimmers who may have limited function in their hands, trunk and legs and mainly rely on their arms to swim.
- S3/SB2: swimmers who have leg or arm amputations, have severe coordination problems in their limbs or have to swim with their arms but don't use their trunk or legs.
- S4/SB3: swimmers who have a function in their hands and arms but can't use their trunk or legs to swim or they have three amputated limbs.
- S5/SB4: swimmers who have hemiplegia, paraplegia or short stature.
- S6/SB5: swimmers who have short stature or arm amputations or some form of coordination problem on one side of their body.
- S7/SB6: swimmers who have one leg and one arm amputation on the opposite side or paralysis on one side of their body. These swimmers have full control of their arms and trunk but variable function in their legs.
- S8/SB7: swimmers who have a single amputation or restrictive movement in their hip, knee and ankle joints.
- S9/SB8: swimmers who have joint restrictions in one leg or double below-the-knee amputations.
- S10/SB9: swimmers who have minor physical impairments, for example, loss of one hand.
- S11/SB11: swimmers who have severe visual impairments and have very low or no light perception, such as blindness, they are required to wear blackened goggles to compete. They use tappers when competing in swimming events.
- S12/SB12: swimmers who have a moderate visual impairment and have a visual field of fewer than 5 degrees radius. They are required to wear blackened goggles to compete. They may wish to use a tapper.
- S13/SB13: swimmers who have a minor visual impairment and have high visual acuity. They are required to wear blackened goggles to compete. They may wish to use a tapper.
- S14/SB14: swimmers who have intellectual impairment.

== Schedule ==
The event is scheduled with morning and evening sessions from 12 to 17 June 2021. Morning sessions are for heats while evening ones are for finals and coincided with qualifications for the Olympic team.

Legend
Key	H	½	F	TF
Value	Heats	Semifinals	Final	Timed final

M = Morning session, E = Evening session

=== Olympic qualifications schedule ===
Men
Date →	12 Jun		13 Jun		14 Jun		15 Jun		16 Jun		17 Jun	
Event ↓	M	E	M	E	M	E	M	E	M	E	M	E
50 m freestyle											H	F
100 m freestyle							H	F				
200 m freestyle			H	F								
400 m freestyle	H	F										
800 m freestyle					TF	TF						
1500 m freestyle											TF	TF
100 m backstroke			H	F								
200 m backstroke									H	F		
100 m breaststroke	H	F										
200 m breaststroke							H	F				
100 m butterfly											H	F
200 m butterfly					H	F						
200 m individual medley									H	F		
400 m individual medley	H	F										

Women
Date →	12 Jun		13 Jun		14 Jun		15 Jun		16 Jun		17 Jun	
Event ↓	M	E	M	E	M	E	M	E	M	E	M	E
50 m freestyle											H	F
100 m freestyle									H	F		
200 m freestyle					H	F						
400 m freestyle			H	F								
800 m freestyle											TF	TF
1500 m freestyle							TF	TF				
100 m backstroke			H	F								
200 m backstroke											H	F
100 m breaststroke	H	F										
200 m breaststroke									H	F		
100 m butterfly	H	F										
200 m butterfly							H	F				
200 m individual medley					H	F						
400 m individual medley	H	F										

=== Paralympic qualifications schedule ===
Men
Date →	12 Jun		13 Jun		14 Jun		15 Jun		16 Jun		17 Jun	
Event ↓	M	E	M	E	M	E	M	E	M	E	M	E
50 m freestyle Multi-Class			H	F								
100 m freestyle Multi-Class							H	F				
200 m freestyle Multi-Class	H	F										
400 m freestyle Multi-Class	H	F										
50 m backstroke Multi-Class					H	F						
100 m backstroke Multi-Class									H	F		
50 m breaststroke Multi-Class			H	F								
100 m breaststroke Multi-Class							H	F				
50 m butterfly Multi-Class									H	F		
100 m butterfly Multi-Class			H	F								
150 m individual medley Multi-Class					H	F						
200 m individual medley Multi-Class					H	F						

Women
Date →	12 Jun		13 Jun		14 Jun		15 Jun		16 Jun		17 Jun	
Event ↓	M	E	M	E	M	E	M	E	M	E	M	E
50 m freestyle Multi-Class			H	F								
100 m freestyle Multi-Class							H	F				
200 m freestyle Multi-Class	H	F										
400 m freestyle Multi-Class	H	F										
50 m backstroke Multi-Class					H	F						
100 m backstroke Multi-Class									H	F		
50 m breaststroke Multi-Class							H	F				
100 m breaststroke Multi-Class							H	F				
50 m butterfly Multi-Class									H	F		
100 m butterfly Multi-Class			H	F								
200 m individual medley Multi-Class					H	F						

== Results ==
Key: Highlighted swimmers achieved the qualification conditions to be included in the Olympic team in that respective event.
Legend: WR – World record; CR – Commonwealth record; OC – Oceanian record; NR – Australian National record; ACR – Australian All Comers record; Club – Australian Club record; MR – Meet record Q – Olympic Qualification

=== Men's ===
Event	First		Second		Third	
50 m freestyle	Cameron McEvoy	22.07 (Note: Qualified due to previous selection in the Olympic team)	Grayson Bell	22.16	James Roberts	22.21
100 m freestyle	Kyle Chalmers	47.59 Q	Matthew Temple	48.32 Q	Cameron McEvoy	48.49
200 m freestyle	Kyle Chalmers	1:45.48 Q	Elijah Winnington	1:45.55 Q	Thomas Neill	1:45.70
400 m freestyle	Elijah Winnington	3:42.65 Q	Jack McLoughlin	3:43.27 Q	Mack Horton	3:43.92
800 m freestyle	Jack McLoughlin	7:42.51 Q	Thomas Neill	7:48.97	Samuel Short	7:59.55
1500 m freestyle	Jack McLoughlin	14:52.69 Q	Samuel Short	14:57.22	Thomas Neill	15:08.55
100 m backstroke	Mitch Larkin	53.40 Q	Isaac Cooper	53.49	Tristan Hollard	54.00
200 m backstroke	Tristan Hollard	1:56.44 Q	Ty Hartwell	1:57.45	Travis Mahoney	1:58.06
100 m breaststroke	Zac Stubblety-Cook	59.69 Q (Note: Qualified due to selection for the 200 m breaststroke event and attaining the FINA A-Cut qualifying time)	Daniel Cave	59.99	Jake Packard	1:00.12
200 m breaststroke	Zac Stubblety-Cook	2:06.28 CR Q	Matthew Wilson	2:08.52 Q (Note: Qualified due to extenuating circumstances.)	Daniel Cave	2:09.62
100 m butterfly	Matthew Temple	50.45 OC Q	David Morgan	51.67 Q	Shaun Champion	51.93
200 m butterfly	Matthew Temple	1:55.25 Q	David Morgan	1:55.40 Q	Bowen Gough	1:55.88
200 m IM	Mitch Larkin	1:56.29 Q	Brendon Smith	1:58.82 Q (Note: Qualified due to selection in the 400m IM)	Se-Bom Lee	2:00.36
400 m IM	Brendon Smith	4:10.04 NR Q	Se-Bom Lee	4:14.16 Q	Kieren Pollard	4:15.68

=== Women's ===
Event	First		Second		Third	
50 m freestyle	Emma McKeon	23.93 Q	Cate Campbell	23.94 Q	Bronte Campbell	24.46
100 m freestyle	Emma McKeon	52.35 Q	Cate Campbell	52.59 Q	Madison Wilson	52.76
200 m freestyle	Ariarne Titmus	1:53.09 CR Q	Emma McKeon	1:54.74 Q	Madison Wilson	1:55.68
400 m freestyle	Ariarne Titmus	3:56.90 OC Q	Tamsin Cook	4:04.10 Q	Kiah Melverton	4:04.78
800 m freestyle	Ariarne Titmus	8:15.57 OC Q	Kiah Melverton	8:19.05 Q	Kareena Lee	8:23.54
1500 m freestyle	Maddy Gough	15:46.13 NR Q	Kiah Melverton	15:57.14 Q	Moesha Johnson	15:59.96
100 m backstroke	Kaylee McKeown	57.45 WR Q	Emily Seebohm	58.59 Q	Mollie O'Callaghan	58.86
200 m backstroke	Kaylee McKeown	2:04.28 CR Q	Emily Seebohm	2:06.38 Q	Minna Atherton	2:09.24
100 m breaststroke	Chelsea Hodges	1:05.99 Q	Jessica Hansen	1:06.69 Q	Jenna Strauch	1:06.96
200 m breaststroke	Jenna Strauch	2:23.12 Q	Abbey Harkin	2:23.59 Q	Tessa Wallace	2:24.86
100 m butterfly	Emma McKeon	55.93 OC Q	Brianna Throssell	57.11	Alexandria Perkins	58.61
200 m butterfly	Brianna Throssell	2:07.63 Q	Elizabeth Dekkers	2:08.57	Laura Taylor	2:08.64
200 m IM	Kaylee McKeown	2:08.19 Q	Tessa Wallace	2:11.79	Meg Bailey	2:12.88
400 m IM	Jenna Forrester	4:39.93	Meg Bailey	4:40.18	Emilie Muir	4:44.82

=== Men's ===
Event	First		Second		Third	
50 m freestyle S3, S5, S7-S10, S12-S13	Braeden Jason (S14); Jacob Templeton (S13); Rowan Crothers (S10); William Martin (S9); Matthew Levy (S7)	24.60 (839 points); 24.61 (838 points); 23.98 (901 points); 25.38 (846 points); 28.65 (844 points)	Oscar Stubbs (S13); Tom Gallagher (S10); Timothy Disken (S9)	25.15 (785 points); 24.44 (851 points); 25.80 (805 points)		
100 m freestyle S7-S8, S9-S10, S14	Ricky Betar (S14); Braedan Jason (S12); Rowan Crothers (S10); William Martin (S9); Ben Popham (S8); Mathew Levy (S7)	52.28 (820 points); 53.27 (873 points); 52.16 (920 points); 55.16 (809 points); 57.37 (902 points); 1:02.55 (770 points)	Jack Ireland (S14); Tom Gallagher (S10)	53.24 (777 points); 53.86 (843 points)		
200 m freestyle S1-S5, S14	Ricky Betar (S14)	1:56.16 (920 points)	Jack Ireland (S14)	1:59.02 (855 points)	Liam Schluter (S14)	2:00.29 (828 points)
400 m freestyle S6-S13	Tom Gallagher (S10); Brendan Hall (S9); Ben Popham (S8)	4:10.62 (853 points); 4:15.89 (932 points); 4:35.15 (835 points)	Lewis Bishop (S10); Alex Tuckfield (S9); Jesse Aungles (S8)	4:31.75 (669 points); 4:16.13 (929 points); 4:46.58 (745 points)	Harrison Vig (S9)	4:18.94 (899 points)
50 m backstroke S1-S5	Grant Patterson (S3)	58.02 (385 points)				
100 m backstroke S1-S2, S6-S14	Benjamin Hance (S14); Jacob Templeton (S13); Jeremy McClure (S13); Timothy Hodge (S9); Jesse Aungles (S8)	57.56 (1091 points); 1:01.50 (783 points); 1:13.70 (740 points); 1:02.20 (953 points); 1:07.94 (794 points)	Ricky Betar (S14); Brendan Hall (S9)	1:01.05 (915 points); 1:05.36 (822 points)	Harrison Vig (S9)	1:06.08 (795 points)
50 m breaststroke SB1-SB3	Ahmed Kelly (SB3); Grant Patterson (SB2)	54.48 (662 points); 1:01.66 (554 points)				
100 m breaststroke SB5-SB14	Jake Michel (SB14); Rick Pendleton (SB9); Timothy Disken (SB8); Blake Cochrane (SB7); Matthew Levy (SB6); Ahmed Kelly (SB3)	1:04.35 (1028 points); 1:12.17 (698 points); 1:11.30 (830 points); 1:17.26 (786 points); 1:23.57 (835 points); 1:56.90 (713 points)	Lachlan Hanratty (SB14); Joel Mundie (SB6)	1:15.89 (627 points); 1:47.00 (398 points)		
50 m butterfly S1-S2, S6-S14	Joel Mundie (S7) (Finland) Henrik Krogius (S5)	33.48 (611 points); 45.26 (338 points)				
100 m butterfly S7-S14	Benjamin Hance (S14); Hugh Gillham (S10); William Martin (S9)	57.67 (842 points); 58.89 (802 points); 57.76 (1061 points)	Alex Saffy (S9); Liam Schluter (S14)	1:00.27 (934 points); 58.60 (803 points)	Timothy Hodge (S9)	1:00.67 (915 points)
150 m individual medley SM2-SM4	Ahmed Kelly (SM3)	3:00.70 (697 points)	Grant Patterson (SM3)	3:06.18 (637 points)		
200 m individual medley SM5-SM14	Liam Schluter (SM14); Hugh Gillam (SM10); Timothy Hodge (SM9); Jesse Aungles (SM8); Matthew Levy (SM7)	2:14.99 (856 points); 2:19.69 (727 points); 2:15.25 (964 points); 2:27.44 (856 points); 2:36.35 (896 points)	Joshua Alford (SM14); Alex Saffy (SM9); Joel Mundie (SM7)	2:19.18 (781 points); 2:22.45 (825 points); 2:57.00 (617 points)		

=== Women's ===
Event	First		Second		Third	
50 m freestyle S4, S6, S8, S10-S13	Katja Dedekind (S13); Jenna Jones (S12); Keira Stephens (S10); Poppy Richards (S8); Rachael Watson (S4)	26.80 (986 points); 29.19 (763 points); 28.85 (854 points); 31.70 (763 points); 39.73 (866 points)	Kirralee Hayes (S13); Natalie Shaw (S10)	28.04 (860 points); 29.48 (800 points)	Poppy Wilson (S10)	29.84 (772 points)
100 m freestyle S4-S14	Jenna Jones (S12); Jasmine Greenwood (S10); Ellie Cole (S9)	1:02.97 (798 points); 1:02.03 (868 points); 1:04.06 (813 points)	Natalie Shaw (S10); Ashleigh McConnell (S9)	1:03.33 (816 points); 1:04.13 (810 points)	Keira Stephens (S10); Emily Beecroft (S9)	1:05.93 (723 points); 1:04.26 (805 points)
200 m freestyle S4, S5, S14	Madel McTernan (S14)	2:13.28 (769 points)	Ruby Storm (S14)	2:15.01 (740 points)	Lucy Jade (S14)	2:16.47 (716 points)
400 m freestyle S6-S13	Katja Dedekind (S13); Monique Murphy (S10); Lake Patterson (S9); Isabella Vincent (S7)	4:38.11 (813 points); 4:43.28 (859 points); 4:42.25 (817 points); 5:38.32 (690 points)	Natalie Shaw (S10); Ellie Cole (S9)	4:45.02 (843 points); 4:47.30 (774 points)	Poppy Wilson (S10)	4:59.70 (725 points)
100 m backstroke S1, S2, S6-S14	Madel McTernan (S14); Katja Dedekind (S13); Jasmine Greenwood (S10); Ellie Cole (S9); Isabella Vincent (S7)	1:10.46 (751 points); 1:07.16 (939 points); 1:09.58 (848 points); 1:11.62 (834 points); 1:25.21 (811 points)	Jaime-Lee Getson (S14); Natalie Shaw (S10)	1:12.23 (697 points); 1:13.93 (707 points)	Ruby Storm (S14)	1:13.70 (656 points)
50 m butterfly S4-S7	Tahlia Blanshard (S7)	36.33 (806 points)				
100 m butterfly S4-S7	Paige Leonhardt (S14); Jasmine Greenwood (S10); Emily Beecroft (S9); Tahlia Blanshard (S7)	1:06.21 (890 points); 1:08.17 (774 points); 1:09.78 (718 points); 1:25.45 (669 points)	Taylor Corry (S14)	1:08.01 (821 points)	Ruby Storm (S14)	1:09.50 (769 points)
200 m IM SM5-SM14	Ashleigh Van Rijswijk (SM14); Jasmine Greenwood (SM10); Tiffany Thomas Kane (SM7)	2:37.49 (678 points); 2:29.83 (905 points); 3:05.90 (744 points)	Victoria Jessamine (SM14); Poppy Wilson (SM10); Isabella Vincent (SM7)	2:39.20 (657 points); 2:40.23 (740 points); 3:10.72	Maddison Hinds (SM14); Natalie Shaw (SM10)	2:49.92 (540 points); 2:41.78 (719 points)

- Information retrieved from Swimming Australia.

== Records ==
During the 2021 Australian Swimming Championships the following records were set.

=== World records ===
Event	Name (Previous)	Time (Previous)	Year	Location	Name (New)	Time (New)	Difference
Women's 100 m backstroke	(United States) Regan Smith	57.57	2019	Gwangju, South Korea	(Australia) Kaylee McKeown	57.45	-0.12

=== Commonwealth records ===
Event	Name (Previous)	Time (Previous)	Year	Location	Name (New)	Time (New)	Difference
Men's 200 m breaststroke	(Australia) Matthew Wilson	2:06.67	2019	Gwangju, South Korea	(Australia) Zac Stubblety-Cook	2:06.28	-0.39
Women's 200 m freestyle	(Australia) Ariarne Titmus	1:54.27	2019	Gwangju, South Korea	(Australia) Ariarne Titmus	1:53.09	-1.18
Women's 400 m freestyle	(Australia) Ariarne Titmus	3:58.76	2019	Gwangju, South Korea	(Australia) Ariarne Titmus	3:56.90	-1.86
Women's 200 m backstroke	(Australia) Kaylee McKeown	2:04.31	2021	Sydney, Australia	(Australia) Kaylee McKeown	2:04.28	-0.03

=== Australian records ===
Event	Name (Previous)	Time (Previous)	Year	Location	Name (New)	Time (New)	Difference
Men's 100 m butterfly	(Australia) Andrew Lauterstein	50.85	2009	Rome, Italy	(Australia) Matthew Temple	50.45	-0.40
Men's 400 m individual medley	(Australia) Thomas Fraser-Holmes	4:10.14	2013	Adelaide, Australia	(Australia) Brendon Smith	4:10.04	-0.10
Women's 800 m freestyle	(Australia) Ariarne Titmus	8:15.70	2019	Gwangju, South Korea	(Australia) Ariarne Titmus	8:15.57	-0.13
Women's 1500 m freestyle	(Australia) Jessica Ashwood	15:52.17	2015	Kazan, Russia	(Australia) Maddy Gough	15:46.13	-6.04
Women's 100 m butterfly	(Australia) Emma McKeon	56.18	2017	Budapest, Hungary	(Australia) Emma McKeon	55.93	-0.25

== Olympic and Paralympic Team ==
For the Olympic team, up to 56 athletes will be selected and finalised on 17 June 2021. The following table includes athletes who were placed in the top 2 in the finals within the OQT, considered for relay events or selected as part of additional FINA selection. The Paralympic team is selected differently from the Olympic team and is based on a points system rather than just time.

=== Olympic team ===
Men	Women
Kyle Chalmers; Isaac Cooper; Alexander Graham; Tristan Hollard; Mack Horton; Zac Incerti; Mitch Larkin; Se-Bom Lee; Cameron McEvoy; Jack McLoughlin; David Morgan; Thomas Neill; Brendon Smith; Zac Stubblety-Cook; Matthew Temple; Matthew Wilson; Elijah Winnington	Bronte Campbell; Cate Campbell; Tamsin Cook; Maddy Gough; Jessica Hansen; Abbey Harkin; Meg Harris; Chelsea Hodges; Emma McKeon; Kaylee McKeown; Kiah Melverton; Leah Neale; Mollie O'Callaghan; Emily Seebohm; Jenna Strauch; Brianna Throssell; Ariarne Titmus; Madison Wilson

=== Paralympic team ===
Men	Women
Jesse Aungles; Ricky Betar; Rowan Crothers; Timothy Disken; Tom Gallagher; Brenden Hall; Benjamin Hance; Timothy Hodge; Ahmed Kelly; Matthew Levy; William Martin; Jake Michel; Grant Patterson; Ben Popham; Liam Schluter; Alexander Tuckfield; Col Pearse	Emily Beecroft; Ellie Cole; Katja Dedekind; Jasmine Greenwood; Kirralee Hayes; Paige Leonhardt; Ashleigh McConnell; Madeleine McTernan; Lakeisha Patterson; Keira Stephens; Ruby Storm; Tiffany Thomas Kane; Ashleigh Van Rijswijk; Isabella Vincent; Rachel Watson

== Controversy ==
Days before the event, Madeline Groves, a dual silver medallist at the 2016 Summer Olympics withdrew from the trials as "a lesson to all misogynistic perverts in sport". Groves' withdrawal and comments drew considerable media attention and concerns from Swimming Australia President Kieren Perkins. On June 12 at the start of the trials, Swimming Australia announced that they were setting up an independent panel to investigate issues relating to the experiences of girls and women in the sport.

== Broadcast ==
The trials marked the second time Amazon Prime Video broadcast the event via its streaming platform. Grant Hackett, Nicole Livingstone, Annabelle Williams and Giaan Rooney alongside Matt White and Jon Harker were announced as the commentators for Amazon Prime Video on 18 May 2021. The commentary team was also joined by former Olympic medallists James Magnussen and Jodie Henry as poolside interviewers.

== See also ==
- Swimming at the 2020 Summer Olympics
- Australia at the 2020 Summer Olympics
- Australia at the 2020 Summer Paralympics
- 2020 Summer Olympics
- 2020 Summer Paralympics
