= 2021 Australian Swimming Championships =

- Host city: Gold Coast, Queensland
- Date: 14–18 April
- Venue: Gold Coast Aquatic Centre
- Events: 41 (men: 20; women: 20, mixed: 1)

The 2021 Australian Swimming Championships were held from 14 to 18 April 2021 at the Gold Coast Aquatic Centre in Gold Coast, Queensland, Australia.

Following Australia's performance at the 2016 Rio Olympics where 29 medals were won and finishing 10th on the medal tally, Swimming Australia announced in the February 2017 that the timing of the selection trials would be modified. Historically, the trials were held in April several months before the Olympics were held. This will be now changed to follow the American model where the trials are held six weeks before. The 2021 Australian Swimming Trials were then held at the South Australia Aquatic and Leisure Centre from 12 to 17 June and will be selection trials for the 2020 Summer Olympics in Tokyo.

With the 2020 Australian Championships cancelled due to the COVID-19 pandemic, Swimming Australia released the 2021 swimming competition calendar in July 2020. In September 2020, it was announced that Gold Coast would be hosting the event. This meet followed the structure of the Olympic program with heats in the evenings and finals in the morning. This follows the prescient set at the 2008 Beijing Olympics where broadcaster NBC demanded this change so that the finals will be shown on primetime in the United States.

The event was held in a 10-lane pool with 10 lanes being used. This meant that two non-Australian swimmers could progress through the final. With the exception of the distance events, the heats were swum in reverse order with the fastest seeded heat first. Three finals for each event were held – men's 18–19 years, men's 21–21 years, women's 17–18 years, women's 19–20 years and men's and women's open.

There were no major withdrawals from the event with the exception of 2016 Olympian Georgia Bohl who pulled out due to a knee injury. During the Day 2 heats session, Mitch Larkin was disqualified in the heats of the 100 metre backstroke for a false start. Kyle Chalmers won the 50, 100 and 200 metre freestyle events, defending his titles from 2019. By taking out the 50 metre butterfly event, Holly Barratt at the age of 33 became the oldest female Australian champion eclipsing the silver medallist from the 1912 Olympics Mina Wylie. Singer, songwriter Cody Simpson made his return to competitive swimming, reaching the final of the 50 metre butterfly event.

== Schedule ==
Legend
| Key | H | ½ | F | TF |
| Value | Heats | Semifinals | Final | Timed final |

M = Morning session, E = Evening session

Men
| Date → | 14 Apr | | 15 Apr | | 16 Apr | | 17 Apr | | 18 Apr | |
| Event ↓ | – | E | M | E | M | E | M | E | M | – |
|---|---|---|---|---|---|---|---|---|---|---|
| 50 m freestyle | | | | | | | | H | F | |
| 100 m freestyle | | | | H | F | | | | | |
| 200 m freestyle | | H | F | | | | | | | |
| 400 m freestyle | | | | | | H | F | | | |
| 800 m freestyle | | | | TF | TF | | | | | |
| 1500 m freestyle | | | | | | | | TF | TF | |
| 50 m backstroke | | H | F | | | | | | | |
| 100 m backstroke | | | | H | F | | | | | |
| 200 m backstroke | | | | | | H | F | | | |
| 50 m breaststroke | | | | H | F | | | | | |
| 100 m breaststroke | | H | F | | | | | | | |
| 200 m breaststroke | | | | | | | | H | F | |
| 50 m butterfly | | | | | | | | H | F | |
| 100 m butterfly | | | | | | H | F | | | |
| 200 m butterfly | | | | H | F | | | | | |
| 200 m individual medley | | | | | | H | F | | | |
| 400 m individual medley | | H | F | | | | | | | |
| 4 × 100 m freestyle relay | | | | | | | TF | | | |
| 4 × 200 m freestyle relay | | | TF | | | | | | | |
| 4 × 100 m medley relay | | | | | | | | | TF | |

Mixed
| Date → | 14 Apr | | 15 Apr | | 16 Apr | | 17 Apr | | 18 Apr | |
| Event ↓ | – | E | M | E | M | E | M | E | M | – |
|---|---|---|---|---|---|---|---|---|---|---|
| 4 × 100 m medley relay | | | | | TF | | | | | |

Women
| Date → | 14 Apr | | 15 Apr | | 16 Apr | | 17 Apr | | 18 Apr | |
| Event ↓ | – | E | M | E | M | E | M | E | M | – |
|---|---|---|---|---|---|---|---|---|---|---|
| 50 m freestyle | | | | | | | | H | F | |
| 100 m freestyle | | | | H | F | | | | | |
| 200 m freestyle | | H | F | | | | | | | |
| 400 m freestyle | | | | | | H | F | | | |
| 800 m freestyle | | | | | | | | TF | TF | |
| 1500 m freestyle | | | | TF | TF | | | | | |
| 50 m backstroke | | H | F | | | | | | | |
| 100 m backstroke | | | | H | F | | | | | |
| 200 m backstroke | | | | | | H | F | | | |
| 50 m breaststroke | | | | H | F | | | | | |
| 100 m breaststroke | | H | F | | | | | | | |
| 200 m breaststroke | | | | | | | | H | F | |
| 50 m butterfly | | | | | | | | H | F | |
| 100 m butterfly | | | | | | H | F | | | |
| 200 m butterfly | | | | H | F | | | | | |
| 200 m individual medley | | | | | | H | F | | | |
| 400 m individual medley | | H | F | | | | | | | |
| 4 × 100 m freestyle relay | | | | | | | TF | | | |
| 4 × 200 m freestyle relay | | | TF | | | | | | | |
| 4 × 100 m medley relay | | | | | | | | | TF | |

== Medal winners ==
The medallist for the open events are below.

=== Men's events ===
| Event | Gold | | Silver | | Bronze | |
|---|---|---|---|---|---|---|
| 50 m freestyle | Kyle Chalmers; Marion (SA) | 22.30 | Maxim Lobanovszkij; Hungary | 22.43 | Jack Cartwright; St Peters Western (Qld) | 22.47 |
| 100 m freestyle | Kyle Chalmers; Marion (SA) | 48.04 | Jack Cartwright; St Peters Western (Qld) | 48.81 | Louis Townsend; Rackley (Qld) | 49.10 |
| 200 m freestyle | Kyle Chalmers; Marion (SA) | 1:47.03 | Alexander Graham; Bond (Qld) | 1:47.47 | Elijah Winnington; St Peters Western (Qld) | 1:47.55 |
| 400 m freestyle | Elijah Winnington; St Peters Western (Qld) | 3:45.69 | Thomas Neill; Rackley (Qld) | 3:46.35 | Brendon Smith; Nunawading (Vic) | 3:51.04 |
| 800 m freestyle | Thomas Neill; Rackley (Qld) | 7:51.65 | Jack McLoughlin; Chandler (Qld) | 7:59.33 | Nicholas Sloman; Noosa (Qld) | 8:00.68 |
| 1500 m freestyle | Nicholas Sloman; Noosa (Qld) | 15:02.19 | Thomas Neill; Rackley (Qld) | 15:07.23 | Jack McLoughlin; Chandler (Qld) | 15:20.95 |
| 50 m backstroke | Mitch Larkin; St Peters Western (Qld) | 24.75 | Andrew Rice; St Andrew's (Qld) | 25.87 | Jye Cornwell; Yeronga Park (Qld) | 26.00 |
| 100 m backstroke | Tristan Hollard; Southport Olympic (Qld) | 54.83 | Bradley Woodward; Mingara (NSW) | 55.34 | Thomas Hauck; All Saints Gold Coast (Qld) | 55.69 |
| 200 m backstroke | Tristan Hollard; Southport Olympic (Qld) | 1:56.40 | Ty Hartwell; Chandler (Qld) | 1:58.73 | Bradley Woodward; Mingara (NSW) | 1:58.76 |
| 50 m breaststroke | Matthew Wilson; SOPAC (NSW) | 27.55 | Jake Packard; USC Spartans (Qld) | 27.76 | James McKechnie; Starplex (SA) | 28.00 |
| 100 m breaststroke | Zac Stubblety-Cook; Chandler (Qld) | 59.87 | Matthew Wilson; SOPAC (NSW) | 1:00.27 | Jake Packard; USC Spartans (Qld) | 1:00.87 |
| 200 m breaststroke | Zac Stubblety-Cook; Chandler (Qld) | 2:08.28 | Matthew Wilson; SOPAC (NSW) | 2:09.44 | Daniel Cave; Melbourne Vicentre (Vic) | 2:14.22 |
| 50 m butterfly | Shaun Champion; Abbotsleigh (NSW) | 23.94 | William Yang; Loreto Normanhurst (NSW) | 24.08 | Edward Marks; Carlile (NSW) | 24.25 |
| 100 m butterfly | Matthew Temple; Nunawading (Vic) | 51.83 | Shaun Champion; Abbotsleigh (NSW) | 53.01 | Bowen Gough; Nunawading (Vic) | 53.01 |
| 200 m butterfly | Bowen Gough; Nunawading (Vic) | 1:57.08 | Matthew Temple; Nunawading (Vic) | 1:57.92 | David Morgan; TSS Aquatic (Qld) | 1:58.87 |
| 200 m IM | Mitch Larkin; St Peters Western (Qld) | 1:56.74 | Louis Townsend; Rackley (Qld) | 2:02.98 | Thomas Hauck; All Saints Gold Coast (Qld) | 2:03.23 |
| 400 m IM | Brendon Smith; Nunawading (Vic) | 4:15.48 | Elliott Rogerson; Nunawading (Vic) | 4:21.09 | Thomas Hauck; All Saints Gold Coast (Qld) | 4:21.17 |
| 4 × 100 m freestyle relay | SOPAC A (NSW); Tomas Kapocius (51.00); Joshua Hertz (49.87); Joshua Simat (51.07); Angus McDonald (50.38) | 3:22.32 | Nunawading A (Vic); Matthew Temple (49.18); Bowen Gough (50.96); Elliot Rogerson (50.73); Brendon Smith (51.57) | 3:22.44 | TSS Aquatic A (Qld); Cameron McEvoy (50.52); David Morgan (50.94); Grayson Bell (51.73); Zach Maher (50.04) | 3:23.23 |
| 4 × 200 m freestyle relay | Sydney University A (NSW); Daniel Perez (1:53.16); James Koch (1:49.12); Ryan Wilkes (1:51.44); Jack Wilson (1:55.68) | 7:29.40 | Nunawading A (Vic); Matthew Temple (1:49.45); Silas Harris (1:52.63); Elliot Rogerson (1:56.51); Brendon Smith (1:53.40) | 7:31.99 | TSS Aquatic A (Qld); Cameron McEvoy (1:54.26); Kai Edwards (1:54.00); David Morgan (1:52.12); Zach Maher (1:51.82) | 7:32.20 |
| 4 × 100 m medley relay | TSS Aquatic A (Qld); Connor O'Neill (58.78); Grayson Bell (1:03.57); David Morgan (52.91); Zach Maher (49.55) | 3:44.81 | Moreton Bay A (Qld); Conor Daff (57.40); Josh Hardess (1:03.10); Peter Mills (54.23); Alexander Grant (51.39) | 3:46.12 | Nunawading A (Vic); Will Sharp (58.03); Calvin Reed (1:03.33); Ryan Bicknell (57.63); Nicholas Wu (50.94) | 3:49.93 |

=== Women's events ===
| Event | Gold | | Silver | | Bronze | |
|---|---|---|---|---|---|---|
| 50 m freestyle | Cate Campbell; Knox Pymble (NSW) | 24.28 | Emma McKeon; Griffith University (Qld) | 24.39 | Bronte Campbell; Knox Pymble (NSW) | 24.75 |
| 100 m freestyle | Emma McKeon; Griffith University (Qld) | 52.49 | Cate Campbell; Knox Pymble (NSW) | 52.85 | Madison Wilson; Marion (SA) | 53.56 |
| 200 m freestyle | Ariarne Titmus; St Peters Western (Qld) | 1:55.43 | Madison Wilson; Marion (SA) | 1:56.26 | Brianna Throssell; UWA West Coast (WA) | 1:57.29 |
| 400 m freestyle | Ariarne Titmus; St Peters Western (Qld) | 4:01.34 | Leah Neale; Chandler (Qld) | 4:08.26 | Kareena Lee; Noosa (Qld) | 4:09.23 |
| 800 m freestyle | Ariarne Titmus; St Peters Western (Qld) | 8:23.13 | Madeleine Gough; TSS Aquatic (Qld) | 8:25.24 | Kiah Melverton; TSS Aquatic (Qld) | 8:32.84 |
| 1500 m freestyle | Madeleine Gough; TSS Aquatic (Qld) | 16:00.18 | Kareena Lee; Noosa (Qld) | 16:08.28 | Kiah Melverton; TSS Aquatic (Qld) | 16:12.43 |
| 50 m backstroke | Kaylee McKeown; USC Spartans (Qld) | 27.45 MR | Emily Seebohm; Griffith University (Qld) | 27.94 | Madison Wilson; Marion (SA) | 28.13 |
| 100 m backstroke | Kaylee McKeown; USC Spartans (Qld) | 58.60 | Emily Seebohm; Griffith University (Qld) | 59.22 | Jessica Unicomb; Griffith University (Qld) | 1:01.32 |
| 200 m backstroke | Emily Seebohm; Griffith University (Qld) | 2:07.46 | Jessica Unicomb; Griffith University (Qld) | 2:13.27 | Tahlia Thornton; Rackley (Qld) | 2:16.97 |
| 50 m breaststroke | Chelsea Hodges; Southport Olympic (Qld) | 30.20 ACR, MR | Tessa Wallace; USC Spartans (Qld) | 31.22 | Abbey Harkin; St Peters Western (Qld) | 31.43 |
| 100 m breaststroke | Chelsea Hodges; Southport Olympic (Qld) | 1:07.14 | Abbey Harkin; St Peters Western (Qld) | 1:07.27 | Zoe Deacon; Nunawading (Vic) | 2:27.20 |
| 200 m breaststroke | Abbey Harkin; St Peters Western (Qld) | 2:25.26 | Jenna Strauch; Bond (Qld) | 2:25.54 | Jessica Hansen; Cruiz (ACT) | 1:07.41 |
| 50 m butterfly | Holly Barratt; Rockingham (WA) | 25.75 | Madison Wilson; Marion (SA) | 26.92 | Sasha Touretski; Switzerland | 27.16 |
| 100 m butterfly | Emma McKeon; Griffith University (Qld) | 56.44 MR | Brianna Throssell; UWA West Coast (WA) | 57.76 | Alexandria Perkins; USC Spartans (Qld) | 59.01 |
| 200 m butterfly | Brianna Throssell; UWA West Coast (WA) | 2:07.20 | Elizabeth Dekkers; Newmarket Racers (Qld) | 2:07.82 | Meg Bailey; Hunter (NSW) | 2:09.72 |
| 200 m IM | Kaylee McKeown; USC Spartans (Qld) | 2:09.78 | Tessa Wallace; USC Spartans (Qld) | 2:13.14 | Meg Bailey; Hunter (NSW) | 2:13.29 |
| 400 m IM | Jenna Forrester; St Peters Western (Qld) | 4:39.46 | Meg Bailey; Hunter (NSW) | 4:39.59 | Blair Evans; UWA West Coast (WA) | 4:48.73 |
| 4 × 100 m freestyle relay | Nunawading A (Vic); Kayla Costa (56.67); Isabel Ekelmans (56.34); Gabriella Peiniger (56.49); Julia Hawkins (55.67) | 3:45.17 | Nudgee College A (Qld); Brittany Courtney (57.64); Mikayla Messer (56.69); Nicole Sanders (57.98); Charlotte Mitchell (58.02) | 3:50.33 | TSS Aquatic A (Qld); Kiah Melverton (56.49); Alice Stuart (1:00.06); Tanya Stovgaard (57.16); Laura Taylor (57.26) | 3:50.97 |
| 4 × 200 m freestyle relay | TSS Aquatic A (Qld); Kiah Melverton (1:59.85); Laura Taylor (2:04.12); Moesha Johnson (2:01.59); Madeleine Gough (2:00.83) | 8:06.39 | Nunawading A (Vic); Isabel Ekelmans (2:04.18); Kayla Costa (2:02.19); Gabriella Peiniger (2:02.88); Chanelle Underwood (2:05.33) | 8:14.58 | Nudgee College A (Qld); Mikayla Messer (1:59.82); Jade Starr (2:05.81); Charlotte Mitchell (2:04.28); Jessica Mouatt (2:08.26) | 8:18.17 |
| 4 × 100 m medley relay | Marion A (SA); Madison Wilson (1:00.73); Leiston Pickett (1:08.83); Ellysia Oldsen (1:01.31); Bethan Mounfield (54.85) | 4:05.72 | Nunawading A (Vic); Olivia Lefoe (1:04.71); Mikayla Smith (1:08.94); Gabriella Peiniger (1:02.17); Isabel Ekelmans (56.86) | 4:12.68 | TSS Aquatic A (Qld); Tanya Stovgaard (1:04.27); Kiah Melverton (1:11.81); Alice Stuart (1:01.17); Laura Taylor (57.08) | 4:14.33 |

=== Mixed events ===
| Event | Gold | | Silver | | Bronze | |
|---|---|---|---|---|---|---|
| 4 × 100 m medley relay | Nunawading A (Vic); Olivia Lefoe (1:04.22); Zoe Deacon (1:08.91); Bowen Gough (52.71); Nicholas Wu (51.18) | 3:57.02 | Nunawading B (Vic); Will Sharp (57.06); Calvin Reed (1:03.29); Gabriella Peiniger (1:01.68); Julia Hawkins (55.78) | 3:57.81 | TSS Aquatic A (Qld); Cameron McEvoy (58.27); Grayson Bell (1:03.70); Alice Stuart (1:01.68); Laura Taylor (57.47) | 4:00.14 |

Legend: WR – World record; CR – Commonwealth record; OR – Oceanian record; AR – Australian record; ACR – Australian All Comers record; Club – Australian Club record; MR – Meet record

== Records broken ==
During the 2021 Australian Swimming Championships the following records were set.

=== All Comers and Championship records ===
- Women's 50 m breaststroke – Chelsea Hodges, Southport Olympic (30.20) (final)
- Women's 100 m butterfly – Emma McKeon, Griffith University (56.44) (final)

== Club points scores ==
The final club point scores are below. Note: Only the top ten clubs are listed.

Overall club point score
| Rank | Club | State | Points |
|---|---|---|---|
| 1 | Nunawading | Vic | 1,890.5 |
| 2 | St Peters Western | Qld | 1,432 |
| 3 | Rackley | Qld | 1,048.50 |
| 4 | TSS Aquatic | Qld | 860 |
| 5 | Griffith University | Qld | 815.5 |
| 6 | St Andrew's | Qld | 677 |
| 7 | USC Spartans | Qld | 598 |
| 8 | Chandler | Qld | 547 |
| 9 | UWA West Coast | WA | 526.5 |
| 10 | Marion | SA | 492.5 |

== Broadcast ==
Following the delay of the Olympic trials by a year due to the COVID-19 pandemic, the Seven Network agreed to terminate their broadcast partnership with Swimming Australia in October 2020. The deal was announced in September 2015 and had an option to extend to 2025. In February 2021, it was announced the Amazon Prime Video had secured an exclusive, two-year live broadcast streaming deal with Swimming Australia. Both the evening heat sessions and morning final sessions were streamed live on Prime Video and on Swimming Australia's digital platform SwimTV. The commentary team consisted of Jon Harker and Giaan Rooney with Rooney conducting the poolside interviews.
