= 2026 Pan Pacific Swimming Championships – Men's 800 metre freestyle =

Men's 800 metre freestyle at the 2026 Pan Pacific Swimming Championships
- Venue: William Woollett Jr. Aquatics Center
- Dates: August 12
- Competitors: 14 from 5 nations
- Winning time: 7:37.02 CR

Medalists
gold medal	Samuel Short	Australia
silver medal	Bobby Finke	United States
bronze medal	Ben Goedemans	Australia

Official Video (slowest heat)

Official Video (fastest heat)

The men's 800 metre freestyle event at the 2026 Pan Pacific Swimming Championships was held on August 12 at the William Woollett Jr. Aquatics Center in Irvine, California. The event was won by reigning Commonwealth Games champion Samuel Short of Australia in a championship record time of 7:37.02, breaking the previous record of 7:43.74 set by American Zane Grothe at the 2018 championships. Short's performance was the second-fastest of his career, behind only the 7:36.73 he recorded at the Australian selection trials earlier that year. American Bobby Finke, the silver medalist in the event at the 2024 Summer Olympics, claimed the silver medal in 7:42.52, while Australia's Ben Goedemans, the silver medalist at the 2026 Commonwealth Games, won the bronze medal in 7:44.67. Japan's Kazushi Imafuku finished fourth in 7:47.92.

The event was contested as a timed final, with each swimmer competing only once and the overall rankings determined by the fastest times across both heats. Twelve swimmers representing seven nations participated, with the slower heat of four swimmers held during the morning session and the faster heat of eight swimmers contested in the evening. Under the competition regulations, a maximum of two swimmers from each nation were permitted to compete in the fastest heat of a timed-final event. Consequently, Australians Elijah Winnington and Matthew Galea, who had won silver in the 400 metre freestyle and bronze in the 800 metre freestyle, respectively, at the 2026 Commonwealth Games, competed in the morning heat. Galea, who had recorded 7:47.10 to claim Commonwealth Games bronze in July, finished in 8:01.86, considerably slower than his previous performance. Winnington finished fifth overall in 7:50.11, while Galea placed sixth, although neither was eligible to score among the top eight because of the restriction limiting each nation to two scoring swimmers.

In the morning heat, Jamaica's Charles McIntosh established a new Jamaican national record of 8:52.16, improving on the previous record of 8:54.10 set by Dominic Walter in 2010. In the evening heat, Short established the championship record to secure the gold medal, finishing 5.50 seconds ahead of Finke and 7.65 seconds ahead of Goedemans.

== Records ==
Prior to this competition, the existing records were as follows:

Records before the 2026 Pan Pacific Swimming Championships
Record	Time	Athlete (nation)	Meet	Location	Date	Ref
World record	7:32.12	Zhang Lin (CHN)	2009 World Championships	Rome, Italy	July 29, 2009	
Championship record	7:43.74	Zane Grothe (USA)	2018 Pan Pacs	Tokyo, Japan	August 12, 2018	

== Schedule ==
The schedule was as follows:

All times are Pacific Daylight Time (UTC-7)

Date	Time	Round
Wednesday, August 12, 2026	11:28	Slowest heat
Wednesday, August 12, 2026	21:00	Fastest heat

== Results ==
=== Timed final ===
The slowest heat was held at 11:28 on August 12, 2026 with the fastest heat held at 21:00 on the same day.

Timed final results
Rank	Heat	Lane	Swimmer	Nation	Time	Notes
1	2	4	Samuel Short	Australia	7:37.02	CR
2	2	5	Bobby Finke	United States	7:42.52	
3	2	3	Ben Goedemans	Australia	7:44.67	
4	2	6	Kazushi Imafuku	Japan	7:47.92	
5	1	5	Elijah Winnington	Australia	7:50.11	
6	1	4	Matthew Galea	Australia	8:01.86	
7	2	7	Joey Tepper	United States	8:01.92	
8	2	8	Matthew Caldwell	South Africa	8:02.08	
9	2	2	Aiden Kirk	Canada	8:03.24	
10	2	1	Sebastian Paulins	Canada	8:19.81	
11	1	3	Roberto Valdes Ochoa	Mexico	8:23.57	
12	1	6	Charles McIntosh	Jamaica	8:52.16	NR

=== Award ranking ===
Award ranking
Rank	Swimmer	Nation	Time	Notes
1st place, gold medalist(s)	Samuel Short	Australia	7:37.02	CR
2nd place, silver medalist(s)	Bobby Finke	United States	7:42.52	
3rd place, bronze medalist(s)	Ben Goedemans	Australia	7:44.67	
4	Kazushi Imafuku	Japan	7:47.92	
5	Joey Tepper	United States	8:01.92	
6	Matthew Caldwell	South Africa	8:02.08	
7	Aiden Kirk	Canada	8:03.24	
8	Sebastian Paulins	Canada	8:19.81	
