= 2026 Australian Swimming Trials =

- Host city: Sydney, New South Wales
- Date: 8–13 June
- Venue: Sydney Olympic Park Aquatic Centre
- Events: 58 (men: 29; women: 29)

The 2026 Australian Swimming Trials were held from 8 to 13 June 2026 at the Sydney Olympic Park Aquatic Centre in Sydney, New South Wales. It was the selection meet for the 2026 Commonwealth Games held in Glasgow, Scotland, the 2026 Pan Pacific Swimming Championships held in Irvine, California and the 2026 Pan Pacific Para Swimming Championships held in Walnut, California.

In July 2025, Swimming Australia announced a series of changes to the Australian Open Championships and the Australian Swimming Trials, effective from 2026. The Australian Open Championships was renamed the Australian Open. Australian champions in able-bodied events will now be determined at the Trials, reflecting that the year's fastest racing takes place there. Australian champions in multi-class events, however, will continue to be recognised at the Open, as it caters for the entire multi-class community (S1–S19), rather than only para swimmers (S1–S14). The Open will also serve as the annual Open Club Championships.

Dogs from Guide Dogs NSW/ACT were present on the pool deck to help reduce swimmers' anxiety and calm their nerves. The initiative was introduced by Linley Frame, Swimming Australia's national wellbeing and engagement manager, and Shayna Jack, an ambassador for the organisation. The dogs also attended the 2026 Australian Open, where they were well received by competitors. The initiative followed the use of a therapy dog at the 2024 United States Olympic gymnastics trials in Minneapolis.

Samuel Short became the Australian champion in the men's 200, 400, 800 and 1500 metre freestyle events, becoming the first swimmer to do so since Grant Hackett in 2005.

Alexa Leary, who won gold in the Women's 100 metre freestyle S9 event at the 2025 World Para Swimming Championships in Singapore, was absent from the meet, due to reclassification to the S10 class and the occurrence of seizures.

One day prior to the meet, Bronte Campbell announced her retirement from competitive swimming.

== Schedule ==
The event was held over six days in a 10-lane pool with all 10 lanes used for the morning heats and 8 lanes used for the evening finals. There were no semi finals held with the fastest eight swimmers from the heats advancing to the A Final and the next eight fastest contesting the B Final in the 50 m, 100 m and 200 metre events, provided that 24 swimmers entered in the heats. The A Final was swum before the B Final. The heats for these events were swum in the order of fastest to slowest. The 800 and 1500 metre distance events were timed finals with the slow heats being swum in the morning and the fastest heat being contested in the evening. As this was a selection event, no visitors were permitted to progress to the A Final however there was no restrictions on the number of visitors who were permitted to advance to the B Final. There were no relay events contested and the meet was not scored. The minimum age for swimmers to compete was 13 years for able bodied events and 12 years for multi-class events with the age determined as swimmer's age on 8 June 2026.

Legend
Key	H	½	F	TF
Value	Heats	Semifinals	Final	Timed final

|M = Morning session (starting at 11:00), E = Evening session (starting at 19:30)

Men
Date →	8 June		9 June		10 June		11 June		12 June		13 June	
Event ↓	M	E	M	E	M	E	M	E	M	E	M	E
50 m freestyle					H	F						
100 m freestyle							H	F				
200 m freestyle			H	F								
400 m freestyle	H	F										
800 m freestyle					TF	TF						
1500 m freestyle									TF	TF		
50 m backstroke	H	F										
100 m backstroke			H	F								
200 m backstroke									H	F		
50 m breaststroke					H	F						
100 m breaststroke	H	F										
200 m breaststroke									H	F		
50 m butterfly											H	F
100 m butterfly			H	F								
200 m butterfly					H	F						
200 m individual medley							H	F				
400 m individual medley											H	F

Men Multi-Class
Date →	8 June		9 June		10 June		11 June		12 June		13 June	
Event ↓	M	E	M	E	M	E	M	E	M	E	M	E
50 m freestyle					H	F						
100 m freestyle											H	F
200 m freestyle	H	F										
400 m freestyle							H	F				
50 m backstroke			H	F								
100 m backstroke									H	F		
50 m breaststroke									H	F		
100 m breaststroke							H	F				
50 m butterfly	H	F										
100 m butterfly			H	F								
150 m individual medley					H	F						
200 m individual medley					H	F						

Women
Date →	8 June		9 June		10 June		11 June		12 June		13 June	
Event ↓	M	E	M	E	M	E	M	E	M	E	M	E
50 m freestyle											H	F
100 m freestyle									H	F		
200 m freestyle					H	F						
400 m freestyle	H	F										
800 m freestyle							TF	TF				
1500 m freestyle											TF	TF
50 m backstroke	H	F										
100 m backstroke			H	F								
200 m backstroke							H	F				
50 m breaststroke					H	F						
100 m breaststroke			H	F								
200 m breaststroke									H	F		
50 m butterfly			H	F								
100 m butterfly	H	F										
200 m butterfly							H	F				
200 m individual medley	H	F										
400 m individual medley											H	F

Women's Multi-Class
Date →	8 June		9 June		10 June		11 June		12 June		13 June	
Event ↓	M	E	M	E	M	E	M	E	M	E	M	E
50 m freestyle					H	F						
100 m freestyle											H	F
200 m freestyle	H	F										
400 m freestyle							H	F				
50 m backstroke			H	F								
100 m backstroke									H	F		
50 m breaststroke									H	F		
100 m breaststroke							H	F				
50 m butterfly	H	F										
100 m butterfly			H	F								
150 m individual medley					H	F						
200 m individual medley					H	F						

== Qualification criteria ==
The priority 1 selection criteria consisted of finishing either first and second in the A final of an individual event and finishing in time equal or fastest of the qualification times set out below by Swimming Australia. The times were those set by the last place qualifier of the final in each event of the 2025 World Aquatics Championships.

2026 Australian Swimming Trials qualification times
Event	Men	Women
50 metre freestyle	21.77	24.45
100 metre freestyle	47.64	53.51
200 metre freestyle	1:45.60	1:56.03
400 metre freestyle	3:45.88	4:06.75
800 metre freestyle	7:46.36	8:27.51
1500 metre freestyle	14:51.06	16:08.19
50 metre backstroke	24.53	27.57
100 metre backstroke	52.57	59.56
200 metre backstroke	1:55.64	2:09.09
50 metre breaststroke	26.93	30.37
100 metre breaststroke	59.39	1:06.17
200 metre breaststroke	2:09.32	2:24.10
50 metre butterfly	22.91	25.62
100 metre butterfly	50.88	57.11
200 metre butterfly	1:54.94	2:07.95
200 metre individual medley	1:57.49	2:10.49
400 metre individual medley	4:13.59	4:38.31

The priority 1 selection criteria for the para swimming events consisted of finishing first, second and third per class in each event and swimming a time equal or faster of the qualification times set out below by Swimming Australia. Due to the multi-class system that is used to determine who advanced to the final, qualification times could also be achieved in the heats. The times were calculated as the average eight place World Para Swimming world ranking time at the end of each calendar year over the previous four years.

2026 Australian Swimming Trials men's multi-class qualification times for freestyle, backstroke and butterfly events
Event	S1	S2	S3	S4	S5	S6	S7	S8	S9	S10	S11	S12	S13	S14
50 metre freestyle	–	50.82	50.82	39.92	34.13	29.30	29.30	26.05	26.05	25.10	26.92	24.69	24.69	–
100 metre freestyle	–	–	1:26.82	1:26.82	1:16.08	1:08.40	1:00.06	1:00.06	55.08	55.08	55.87	55.87	–	–
200 metre freestyle	4:57.39	4:57.39	3:52.87	3:10.32	2:48.67	–	–	–	–	–	–	–	–	1:57.37
400 metre freestyle	–	–	–	–	5:21.56	5:21.56	5:05.04	4:36.84	4:22.90	–	4:57.43	4:27.53	4:27.53	–
50 metre backstroke	1:53.98	1:06.79	52.83	47.10	38.63	–	–	–	–	–	–	–	–	–
100 metre backstroke	4:05.28	2:25.75	–	–	1:18.97	1:18.97	1:15.83	1:09.67	1:05.05	1:03.74	1:11.86	1:07.27	1:02.05	1:01.15
50 metre butterfly	–	–	–	36.41	36.41	33.27	33.50	–	–	–	–	–	–	–
100 metre butterfly	–	–	–	–	–	–	1:05.72	1:05.72	1:02.25	59.25	1:07.74	1:01.21	59.11	57.60
100 metre freestyle (relay only)	–	–	–	–	–	–	–	–	–	–	–	–	–	53.14

2026 Australian Swimming Trials men's multi-class qualification times for breaststroke events
Event	SB1	SB2	SB3	SB4	SB5	SB6	SB7	SB8	SB9	–	SB11	SB12	SB13	SB14
50 metre breaststroke	1:11.39	1:11.39	54.38	–	–	–	–	–	–	–	–	–	–	–
100 metre breaststroke	–	–	1:49.86	1:49.86	1:40.52	1:25.86	1:14.33	1:14.33	1:10.67	–	1:22.39	1:10.29	1:10.29	1:08.15

2026 Australian Swimming Trials men's multi-class qualification times for individual medley events
Event	SM1	SM2	SM3	SM4	SM5	SM6	SM7	SM8	SM9	SM10	SM11	SM12	SM13	SM14
150 metre individual medley	–	3:20.09	3:20.09	2:49.96	–	–	–	–	–	–	–	–	–	–
200 metre individual medley	–	–	–	–	2:51.49	2:51.49	2:49.64	2:31.58	2:22.39	2:18.39	2:37.92	2:17.69	2:17.69	2:13.20

2026 Australian Swimming Trials women's multi-class qualification times for freestyle, backstroke and butterfly events
Event	S1	S2	S3	S4	S5	S6	S7	S8	S9	S10	S11	S12	S13	S14
50 metre freestyle	–	–	44.19	44.19	35.71	35.71	32.64	32.64	28.48	28.48	31.51	28.54	28.54	–
100 metre freestyle	–	2:16.88	2:16.88	1:33.03	1:33.03	1:15.53	1:15.53	1:04.78	1:04.78	1:02.46	1:11.18	1:04.07	–	–
200 metre freestyle	–	–	–	3:20.24	3:20.24	–	–	–	–	–	–	–	–	2:12.98
400 metre freestyle	–	–	–	–	5:49.90	5:49.90	5:43.89	5:17.68	4:55.90	4:51.64	5:39.78	4:58.77	4:58.77	–
50 metre backstroke	1:39.42	1:39.42	1:08.28	55.57	46.47	–	–	–	–	–	–	–	–	–
100 metre backstroke	3:35.84	3:35.84	–	–	1:28.96	1:28.96	1:23.26	1:23.26	1:14.64	1:12.17	1:22.29	1:16.25	1:13.14	1:10.33
50 metre butterfly	–	–	–	51.59	51.59	39.34	37.26	–	–	–	–	–	–	–
100 metre butterfly	–	–	–	–	–	–	1:19.18	1:19.18	1:11.12	1:09.21	–	1:10.56	1:10.56	1:08.00
100 metre freestyle (relay only)	–	–	–	–	–	–	–	–	–	–	–	–	–	1:01.57

2026 Australian Swimming Trials women's multi-class qualification times for breaststroke events
Event	SB1	SB2	SB3	SB4	SB5	SB6	SB7	SB8	SB9	–	SB11	SB12	SB13	SB14
50 metre breaststroke	–	1:06.08	1:06.08	–	–	–	–	–	–	–	–	–	–	–
100 metre breaststroke	–	–	2:13.75	2:13.75	1:59.81	1:44.72	1:41.01	1:27.77	1:21.58	–	1:33.58	1:28.45	1:22.55	1:19.35

2026 Australian Swimming Trials men's multi-class qualification times for individual medley events
Event	SM1	SM2	SM3	SM4	SM5	SM6	SM7	SM8	SM9	SM10	SM11	SM12	SM13	SM14
150 metre individual medley	–	–	3:14.33	3:14.33	–	–	–	–	–	–	–	–	–	–
200 metre individual medley	–	–	–	–	4:06.34	3:18.69	3:10.25	2:56.01	2:41.11	2:37.46	3:04.75	2:36.87	2:36.87	2:33.65

== Results ==
The medallist for all events are below.

=== Men's events ===
Event	Gold		Silver		Bronze	
50 metre freestyle	Cameron McEvoy; Somerville House (Qld)	21.32 Q	Jamie Jack; St Peters Western (Qld)	21.52 Q	Flynn Southam; Bond (Qld)	21.72
100 metre freestyle	Kyle Chalmers; Marion (SA)	47.59 Q	Flynn Southam; Bond (Qld)	47.94	Kai Taylor; St Peters Western (Qld)	48.21
200 metre freestyle	Samuel Short; Rackley (Qld)	1:45.16 Q	Kai Taylor; St Peters Western (Qld)	1:45.30 Q	Harrison Turner; Nudgee College (Qld)	1:45.71
400 metre freestyle	Samuel Short; Rackley (Qld)	3:40.67 Q	Elijah Winnington; St Peters Western (Qld)	3:44.17 Q	Benjamin Goedemans; St Peters Western (Qld)	3:45.85
800 metre freestyle	Samuel Short; Rackley (Qld)	7:36.73 CR, ACR, Q	Benjamin Goedemans; St Peters Western (Qld)	7:47.62	Matthew Galea; St Peters Western (Qld)	7:49.09
1500 metre freestyle	Samuel Short; Rackley (Qld)	14:42.09 Q	Matthew Galea; St Peters Western (Qld)	14:50.22 Q	Benjamin Goedemans; St Peters Western (Qld)	14:50.67
50 metre backstroke	Isaac Cooper; St Andrew's (Qld)	24.46 Q	Henry Allan; Bendigo East (Vic)	24.59	Mark Nikolaev; Somerset (Qld)	25.33
100 metre backstroke	Henry Allan; Bendigo East (Vic)	53.52	Stuart Swinburn; City of Sydney (NSW)	54.62	Adam Graham; Manly (NSW)	54.64
200 metre backstroke	Se-Bom Lee; SOPAC (NSW)	1:56.75	Joshua Edwards-Smith; Griffith University (Qld)	1:57.50	Stuart Swinburn; City of Sydney (NSW)	1:57.54
50 metre breaststroke	Samuel Williamson; Melbourne Vicentre (Vic)	26.61 Q	Gideon Burnes; Bond (Qld)	27.37	Joshua Anderson; Brisbane Grammar (Qld)	27.60
100 metre breaststroke	Samuel Williamson; Melbourne Vicentre (Vic)	59.07 Q	Bailey Lello; St Peters Western (Qld)	1:00.33	Joshua Anderson; Brisbane Grammar (Qld)	1:00.42
200 metre breaststroke	Zac Stubblety-Cook; Nunawading (Vic)	2:08.92 Q	Bailey Lello; St Peters Western (Qld)	2:09.84	Joshua Yong; Highlanders (WA)	2:10.31
50 metre butterfly	Ben Armbruster; Bond (Qld)	22.90 Q	Cameron McEvoy; Somerville House (Qld)	22.92	Kyle Chalmers; Marion (SA)	22.97
100 metre butterfly	Matthew Temple; Marion (SA)	50.50 Q	Ben Armbruster; Bond (Qld)	51.00	Harrison Turner; Nudgee College (Qld)	51.47
200 metre butterfly	Harrison Turner; Nudgee College (Qld)	1:55.18	Se-Bom Lee; SOPAC (NSW)	1:57.85	Alex Quach; Nudgee College (Qld)	1:58.49
200 metre individual medley	William Petric; Nunawading (Vic)	1:57.55	Thomas Neill; Rackley (Qld)	1:58.90	Brendon Smith; St Peters Western (Qld)	1:59.11
400 metre individual medley	William Petric; Nunawading (Vic)	4:11.04 Q	Brendon Smith; St Peters Western (Qld)	4:12.70 Q	Se-Bom Lee; SOPAC (NSW)	4:13.00
WR World record | CR Commonwealth record | OC Oceanian record | AR Australian record | ACR Australian Allcomers record | Club Australian Club record

=== Men's multi-class events ===
Event	Gold		Silver		Bronze	
50 metre freestyle	Thomas Gallagher (S10); St Peters Western (Qld)	23.62 Q (943)	Rowan Crothers (S10); Marion (SA)	23.72 Q (931)	Alexander Tuckfield (S10); AquaBlitz Toongabbie (NSW)	24.27 Q (869)
100 metre freestyle	Callum Simpson (S8); Flinders Phoenix (Qld)	56.86 AR, Q (947)	Thomas Gallagher (S10); St Peters Western (Qld)	52.08 Q (919)	Rowan Crothers (S10); Marion (SA)	52.13 Q (917)
200 metre freestyle	Declan Budd (S14); Knox Pymble (NSW)	1:56.37 Q (870)	Jack Ireland (S14); University of Queensland (Qld)	1:56.47 Q (867)	Darren Sisman (S14); Cronulla (NSW)	1:57.17 Q (852)
400 metre freestyle	Callum Simpson (S8); Flinders Phoenix (Qld)	4:26.53 Q (926)	Brenden Hall (S9); USC Spartans (Qld)	4:20.33 Q (885)	Harrison Vig (S9); University of Queensland (Qld)	4:20.61 Q (882)
50 metre backstroke	Benjamin Hance (S14); St Andrew's (Qld)	25.88 (879)	Liam Togher (S9); Knox Pymble (NSW)	30.21 (669)	Eli Kerr (S9); Warrnambool (Vic)	33.50 (491)
100 metre backstroke	Benjamin Hance (S14); St Andrew's (Qld)	57.40 Q (928)	Timothy Hodge (S9); Blacktown (NSW)	1:03.49 Q (832)	Declan Budd (S14); Knox Pymble (NSW); Liam Togher (S9); Knox Pymble (NSW)	1:00.76 Q (782); 1:04.83 Q (782)
50 metre breaststroke	Ahmed Kelly (SB3); Yarra Plenty (Vic)	53.60 Q (653)	Grant Patterson (SB2); Central Cairns (Qld)	1:01.71 Q (553)	Knox Gibson (SB9); Orange (NSW)	34.46 (520)
100 metre breaststroke	Jake Michel (SB14); Carina Leagues CJ's (Qld)	1:05.28 Q (884)	Timothy Hodge (SB8); Blacktown (NSW)	1:12.73 Q (782)	Riley Moore (SB9); Woden Valley (ACT)	1:10.49 Q (749)
50 metre butterfly	Alex Saffy (S10); Woden Valley (ACT)	26.27 (727)	Daniel Rigby (S9); Knox Pymble (NSW)	28.13 (681)	William Martin (S10); Sunshine Coast Grammar (Qld)	27.92 (606)
100 metre butterfly	Declan Budd (S14); Knox Pymble (NSW)	57.11 Q (854)	Timothy Hodge (S9); Blacktown (NSW)	1:00.47 Q (846)	Alex Saffy (S10); Woden Valley (ACT)	57.67 Q (828)
150 metre individual medley	Grant Patterson (SM3); Central Cairns (Qld)	3:11.43 Q (586)	Ahmed Kelly (SM3); Yarra Plenty (Vic)	3:12.71 Q (574)	None awarded	
200 metre individual medley	Timothy Hodge (SM9); Blacktown (NSW)	2:13.82 Q (960)	Ricky Betar (SM14); USC Spartans (Qld)	2:08.77 Q (924)	Samuel Gould (SM14); Griffith University (Qld)	2:15.26 (797)
WR World record | CR Commonwealth record | OC Oceanian record | AR Australian record | ACR Australian Allcomers record | Club Australian Club record

=== Women's events ===
Event	Gold		Silver		Bronze	
50 metre freestyle	Meg Harris; Rackley (Qld)	24.08 Q	Shayna Jack; St Peters Western (Qld)	24.37 Q	Alexandria Perkins; USC Spartans (Qld)	24.63
100 metre freestyle	Mollie O'Callaghan; St Peters Western (Qld)	52.33 Q	Meg Harris; Rackley (Qld)	52.63 Q	Shayna Jack; St Peters Western (Qld)	52.96
200 metre freestyle	Mollie O'Callaghan; St Peters Western (Qld)	1:52.86 Q	Lani Pallister; St Peters Western (Qld)	1:53.65 Q	Inez Miller; Highlanders (WA)	1:56.41
400 metre freestyle	Lani Pallister; St Peters Western (Qld)	3:59.72 Q	Jenna Forrester; St Peters Western (Qld)	4:04.30 Q	Amelia Weber; St Peters Western (Qld)	4:05.79
800 metre freestyle	Lani Pallister; St Peters Western (Qld)	8:13.41 Q	Molly Walker; Southern Performance (SA)	8:26.01 Q	Tiana Kritzinger; Rackley (Qld)	8:32.60
1500 metre freestyle	Lani Pallister; St Peters Western (Qld)	15:40.01 Q	Tiana Kritzinger; Rackley (Qld)	16:10.59	Molly Walker; Southern Performance (SA)	16:13.59
50 metre backstroke	Kaylee McKeown; USC Spartans (Qld)	27.13 Q	Mollie O'Callaghan; St Peters Western (Qld)	27.19 Q	Iona Anderson; Highlanders (WA)	27.33
100 metre backstroke	Kaylee McKeown; USC Spartans (Qld)	57.77 Q	Iona Anderson; Highlanders (WA)	58.60 Q	Hannah Fredericks; St Peters Western (Qld)	59.79
200 metre backstroke	Kaylee McKeown; USC Spartans (Qld)	2:03.98 Q	Iona Anderson; Highlanders (WA)	2:07.59 Q	Hannah Fredericks; St Peters Western (Qld)	2:07.99
50 metre breaststroke	Sienna Toohey; Albury (NSW)	30.57	Lily Koch; Melbourne Vicentre (Vic)	30.97	Mia O'Leary; Griffith University (Qld)	31.23
100 metre breaststroke	Sienna Toohey; Albury (NSW)	1:05.97 Q	Ella Ramsay; Nunawading (Vic)	1:06.70	Sienna Harben; Griffith University (Qld)	1:07.10
200 metre breaststroke	Ella Ramsay; Nunawading (Vic)	2:24.04 Q	Tara Kinder; Melbourne Vicentre (Vic)	2:24.22	Sienna Toohey; Albury (NSW)	2:25.24
50 metre butterfly	Alexandria Perkins; USC Spartans (Qld)	25.60 Q	Lily Price; Rackley (Qld)	25.91	Mackenzie Burns; St Andrew's (Qld); Claudia Fydler; Bond (Qld)	26.21
100 metre butterfly	Alexandria Perkins; USC Spartans (Qld)	56.88 Q	Brittany Castelluzzo; Tea Tree Gully (SA)	57.88	Isabella Boyd; Nunawading (Vic)	57.98
200 metre butterfly	Elizabeth Dekkers; St Peters Western (Qld)	2:04.95 ACR, Q	Brittany Castelluzzo; Tea Tree Gully (SA)	2:06.95 Q	Jessica Cole; Carlile (NSW)	2:08.81
200 metre individual medley	Jenna Forrester; St Peters Western (Qld)	2:09.07 Q	Ella Ramsay; Nunawading (Vic)	2:09.40 Q	Tara Kinder; Melbourne Vicentre (Vic)	2:10.14
400 metre individual medley	Jenna Forrester; St Peters Western (Qld)	4:31.47 Q	Ella Ramsay; Nunawading (Vic)	4:39.23	Tara Kinder; Melbourne Vicentre (Vic)	4:41.16
WR World record | CR Commonwealth record | OC Oceanian record | AR Australian record | ACR Australian Allcomers record | Club Australian Club record

=== Women's multi-class events ===
Event	Gold		Silver		Bronze	
50 metre freestyle	Jasmine Greenwood (S10); Woden Valley (ACT)	28.00 Q (907)	Kirralee Hayes (S13); Genesis (Qld)	28.12 Q (843)	Madeleine McTernan (S14); Griffith University (Qld)	27.95 (808)
100 metre freestyle	Chloe Osborn (S7); Blacktown (NSW)	1:11.49 Q (862)	Lakeisha Patterson (S9); USC Spartans (Qld)	1:03.14 Q (811)	Emily Beecroft (S9); USC Spartans (Qld)	1:04.36 Q (766)
200 metre freestyle	Madeleine McTernan (S14); Griffith University (Qld)	2:10.87 Q (812)	Ruby Storm (S14); USC Spartans (Qld)	2:12.82 Q (777)	Chloe Osborn (S7); Blacktown (NSW)	2:32.59 AR (751)
400 metre freestyle	Lakeisha Patterson (S9); USC Spartans (Qld)	4:36.79 Q (866)	Chloe Osborn (S7); Blacktown (NSW)	5:19.24 Q (761)	Annabelle Moloney (S10); Cotton Tree (Qld)	4:57.06 (703)
50 metre backstroke	Madeleine McTernan (S14); Griffith University (Qld)	32.63 (686)	Michelle Fawer (S10); Engadine (NSW)	36.95 (540)	Giselle Tapfield (S10); Tivoli (NSW)	37.21 (529)
100 metre backstroke	Madeleine McTernan (S14); Griffith University (Qld)	1:08.18 Q (829)	Chloe Osborn (S7); Blacktown (NSW)	1:28.80 (717)	Gemma Sellick (S9); Warringah (NSW)	1:15.54 (711)
50 metre breaststroke	Sahrah Hancock (SB6); Darwin (NT)	47.42 (642)	Ruby Halliday (SB7); MLC Aquatic (Vic)	46.06 (591)	Keira Stephens (SB9); Griffith University (Qld)	37.20 (557)
100 metre breaststroke	Stephanie Bruzzese (SB14); PLC Sydney (NSW)	1:20.46 (717)	Keira Stephens (SB9); Griffith University (Qld)	1:20.67 Q (681)	Sahrah Hancock (SB6); Darwin (NT)	1:44.06 Q (644)
50 metre butterfly	Kael Thompson (S14); USC Spartans (Qld)	30.55 (846)	Jordan Berryman (S7); UWA-West Coast (WA)	39.28 (592)	Sarah Howe (S10); St Hilda's (Qld)	32.21 (586)
100 metre butterfly	Jasmine Greenwood (S10); Woden Valley (ACT)	1:06.63 Q (829)	Kael Thompson (S14); USC Spartans (Qld)	1:07.26 Q (805)	Montana Atkinson (S14); USC Spartans (Qld)	1:08.00 Q (779)
150 metre individual medley	Not contested					
200 metre individual medley	Stephanie Bruzzese (SM14); PLC Sydney (NSW)	2:32.23 Q (751)	Jasmin Fullgrabe (SM9); Marion (SA)	2:40.86 Q (736)	Ruby Storm (SM14); USC Spartans (Qld)	2:34.13 (724)
WR World record | CR Commonwealth record | OC Oceanian record | AR Australian record | ACR Australian Allcomers record | Club Australian Club record

Highlighted swimmers achieved the qualification time to be included in the team in the respective event.

The addition to the above, the below also recorded qualifying times:

- Men's 100 metre backstroke multi-class – Jesse Aungles (S8) from Cruiz (ACT) (1:09.08) (742) (heat)
- Men's 100 metre butterfly multi-class – Lewis Bishop (S9) from Rackley (Qld) (1:01.22) (815) (final)
- Men's 100 metre butterfly multi-class – Col Pearse (S10) from Nunawading (Vic) (58.01) (813) (final)
- Men's 200 metre individual medley multi-class – Col Pearse (S10) from Nunawading (Vic) (2:17.44) (764) (final)
- Men's 200 metre individual medley multi-class – Beau Matthews (S10) from AquaBlitz Toongabbie (NSW) (2:17.44) (764) (final)
- Women's 100 metre breaststroke multi-class – Jenna Jones (SB12) from USC Spartans (Qld) (1:25.27) (616) (final)
- Women's 400 metre freestyle multi-class – Victoria Belando Nicholson (S9) from University of Queensland (Qld) (4:55.08) (715) (heat)

== Records broken ==
During the 2026 Australian Swimming Trials the following records were set.

=== World records ===
- Men's 50 metre freestyle S14 – Benjamin Hance, St Andrew's (Qld) (22.94) (heats) (Note: As the S14 50 metre freestyle and backstroke events are not currently included within the Paralympic swimming program, the International Paralympic Committee does not recognise world records in this event. The world record is recognised by the International Virtus Sports Federation, the international federation for athletes with intellectual impairments)
- Men's 50 metre backstroke S14 – Benjamin Hance, St Andrew's (Qld) (25.65) (heats of the open event)

=== Commonwealth, Oceanian and Australian records ===
- Men's 800 metre freestyle – Samuel Short, Rackley (Qld) (7:36.73) (timed final)

=== Australian records ===
- Men's 100 metre freestyle S8 – Callum Simpson, Flinders Phoenix (Qld) (56.86) (final)
- Men's 400 metre freestyle S8 – Callum Simpson, Flinders Phoenix (Qld) (4:25.50) (heats)
- Men's 50 metre breaststroke SB9 – Riley Moore, Woden Valley (ACT) (31.16) (heats of the open event)
- Women's 100 metre freestyle S14 – Madeleine McTernan, Griffith University (Qld) (1:00.05) (heats)
- Women's 200 metre freestyle S7 – Chloe Osborn, Blacktown (NSW) (2:32.59) (final) (Note: Chloe Osborn swam a 2:32.35 in this event at the 2026 Sydney Open on 15 May and this was used as her seed time coming into the Trials but this was not recognised as the Australian record.)
- Women's 200 metre freestyle S14 – Madeleine McTernan, Griffith University (Qld) (2:10.25) (heats)
- Women's 100 metre backstroke S14 – Madeleine McTernan, Griffith University (Qld) (1:07.97) (heats)

=== All Comers records ===
- Men's 800 metre freestyle – Samuel Short, Rackley (Qld) (7:36.73) (timed final)
- Women's 200 metre butterfly – Elizabeth Dekkers, St Peters Western (Qld) (2:04.95) (final)

== Team announcements ==
=== Commonwealth Games and Pan Pacific Swimming Championships team ===
On 13 June 2026, at the conclusion of the meet, the teams for the 2026 Commonwealth Games and 2026 Pan Pacific Swimming Championships were announced. A team of the 42 was selected for the Commonwealth Games to be held in Glasgow, Scotland from 24 to 29 July 2026, the maximum team size allocated to Swimming Australia by Commonwealth Games Australia. Kyle Chalmers, Cameron McEvoy and Shayna Jack will all be competing in their third Commonwealth Games alongside eight debutants including Henry Allan aged 17, the youngest in the squad.

With an allowable team size of 56 and a maximum of 28 male and 28 female athletes, Swimming Australia selected a team of 38 for the 2026 Pan Pacific Swimming Championships to be held Irvine, California from 12 to 15 August 2026. With the cancellation of the 2022 event due to the COVID-19 pandemic, all bar three swimmers will be participating their first Pan Pacific Swimming Championships, namely Kaylee McKeown, Zac Stubblety-Cook and Elijah Winnington. Chalmers, McEvoy, Jack and Matthew Temple declined their places on the team.

Two weeks before the Trials on 22 May, a 6 member squad for the open water program at the 2026 Pan Pacific Swimming Championships was announced by Swimming Australia. The two 10 km open water events will take place two days ahead of the swimming program on 10 August 2026 at Long Beach, California. The maximum team size for this event was eight swimmers consisting of a maximum of four males and four females. The team was selected on a point-scoring system across the 2026 Open Water World Cup stops in Ibiza, Spain and Golfo Aranci, Italy. Chelsea Gubecka was selected in her third Pan Pacific Swimming Championship team alongside two in debutants in Jacqueline Davison-McGovern and Euan Liney.

2026 Commonwealth Games Team
Name	State	Age (Note: As at the time of the announcement)	Games	Pin No.
Henry Allan	Vic	17	1st	Debut
Iona Anderson	WA	20	1st	854
Ben Armbruster	Qld	24	2nd	834
Hannah Casey	Qld	20	1st	869
Brittany Castelluzzo	SA	25	1st	842
Kyle Chalmers	SA	27	3rd	761
Jessica Cole	NSW	19	1st	Debut
Isaac Cooper	Qld	22	1st	813
Elizabeth Dekkers	Qld	22	1st	822
Jenna Forrester	Qld	22	1st	824
Hannah Fredericks	Qld	23	1st	871
Matthew Galea	Qld	24	1st	Debut
Benjamin Goedemans	Qld	22	1st	872
Meg Harris	Qld	24	1st	814
Jamie Jack	Qld	23	1st	Debut
Shayna Jack	Qld	27	3rd	785
Tara Kinder	Vic	23	1st	863
Tiana Kritzinger	Qld	21	1st	864
Se-Bom Lee	NSW	25	1st	817
Bailey Lello	Qld	23	1st	Debut
Cameron McEvoy	Qld	32	3rd	719
Kaylee McKeown	Qld	24	2nd	786
Inez Miller	WA	19	1st	Debut
Thomas Neill	Qld	24	1st	818
Mollie O'Callaghan	Qld	22	1st	819
Lani Pallister	Qld	24	1st	830
Alexandria Perkins	Qld	25	1st	836
William Petric	Vic	21	1st	858
Ella Ramsay	Vic	21	1st	831
Samuel Short	Qld	22	1st	832
Brendon Smith	Qld	25	1st	820
Edward Sommerville	Qld	21	1st	867
Flynn Southam	Qld	21	2nd	839
Zac Stubblety-Cook	Vic	27	2nd	794
Kai Taylor	Qld	22	1st	852
Matthew Temple	SA	26	2nd	812
Sienna Toohey	NSW	17	1st	876
Harrison Turner	Qld	22	1st	868
Molly Walker	SA	20	1st	Debut
Amelia Weber	Qld	20	1st	Debut
Samuel Williamson	Vic	28	1st	840
Elijah Winnington	Qld	26	2nd	796

2026 Pan Pacific Swimming Championships Team
Name	State	Age	Championships	Pin No.
Iona Anderson	WA	20	1st	854
Ben Armbruster	Qld	24	1st	834
Hannah Casey	Qld	20	1st	869
Brittany Castelluzzo	SA	25	1st	842
Isaac Cooper	Qld	22	1st	813
Elizabeth Dekkers	Qld	22	1st	822
Jenna Forrester	Qld	22	1st	824
Hannah Fredericks	Qld	23	1st	871
Matthew Galea	Qld	24	1st	Debut
Maximillian Giuliani	Qld	22	1st	857
Benjamin Goedemans	Qld	22	1st	872
Meg Harris	Qld	24	1st	814
Charlie Hawke	Qld	23	1st	873
Jamie Jack	Qld	23	1st	Debut
Milla Jansen	Qld	19	1st	862
Tara Kinder	Vic	23	1st	863
Se-Bom Lee	NSW	25	1st	817
Bailey Lello	Qld	23	1st	Debut
Kaylee McKeown	Qld	24	2nd	786
Inez Miller	WA	19	1st	Debut
Mollie O'Callaghan	Qld	22	1st	819
Lani Pallister	Qld	24	1st	830
Alexandria Perkins	Qld	25	1st	836
William Petric	Vic	21	1st	858
Ella Ramsay	Vic	21	1st	831
Samuel Short	Qld	22	1st	832
Brendon Smith	Qld	25	1st	820
Edward Sommerville	Qld	21	1st	867
Zac Stubblety-Cook	Vic	27	2nd	794
Stuart Swinburn	NSW	24	1st	850
Kai Taylor	Qld	22	1st	852
Sienna Toohey	NSW	17	1st	876
Harrison Turner	Qld	22	1st	868
Molly Walker	SA	20	1st	Debut
Amelia Weber	Qld	20	1st	Debut
Samuel Williamson	Vic	28	1st	840
Elijah Winnington	Qld	26	2nd	796
Olivia Wunsch	NSW	20	1st	859

2026 Pan Pacific Swimming Championships Open Water Team
Name	State	Age	Championships	Pin No.
Jacqueline Davison-McGovern	Qld	22	1st	Debut
Chelsea Douyere	Qld	27	3rd	729
Moesha Johnson	Qld	28	1st	827
Tiana Kritzinger	Qld	21	1st	864
Euan Liney	NSW	22	1st	Debut
Nicholas Sloman	Vic	28	2nd	799

=== Commonwealth Games Para and Pan Pacific Para Swimming Championships team ===
One month before the Trials on 10 May, a 18 member squad for the para swimming program at the 2026 Commonwealth Games announced by Swimming Australia. Lakeisha Patterson was selected for her fourth Commonwealth Games alongside seven debutants including Mia Hogan who at 14 is the youngest in the squad. On the final night of the Trails on 13 June 2026, the team for the 2026 Pan Pacific Para Swimming Championships to be held in Walnut, California from 28 to 30 August 2026 was announced. Swimming Australia applied no maximum team size for this squad as the primary purpose of this competition is to support athlete development and provide valuable international exposure in preparation for the 2028 Los Angeles Paralympics. Brenden Hall, Ahmed Kelly and Grant Patterson will be attending their fourth Pan Pacific Para Swimming Championships after previously competing in all three previous editions in 2011, 2014 and 2018. The team consists of six debutants including Liam Togher and Beau Matthews who are both the youngest squad members aged 17.

2026 Commonwealth Games Para Team
Name	State	Age	Games	Pin No.
Emily Beecroft	Qld	26	3rd	P289
Victoria Belando Nicholson	Qld	18	1st	Debut
Jasmin Fullgrabe	SA	21	1st	Debut
Alyssa Gillespie	NSW	17	1st	Debut
Jasmine Greenwood	ACT	21	3rd	P298
Kirralee Hayes	Qld	21	2nd	P315
Timothy Hodge	NSW	25	3rd	P284
Mia Hogan	NSW	14	1st	Debut
Jack Ireland	Qld	26	2nd	P304
Jenna Jones	Qld	25	2nd	P292
Beau Matthews	NSW	17	1st	Debut
Madeleine McTernan	Qld	25	2nd	P308
Lakeisha Patterson	Qld	27	4th	P282
Col Pearse	Vic	22	2nd	P310
Alex Saffy	ACT	20	2nd	P319
Gemma Sellick	NSW	16	1st	Debut
Liam Togher	NSW	16	1st	Debut
Harrison Vig	Qld	23	2nd	P322

2026 Para Pan Pacific Swimming Championships Team
Name	State	Age	Championships	Pin No.
Montana Atkinson	Qld	18	1st	Debut
Jesse Aungles	ACT	31	3rd	P277
Emily Beecroft	Qld	26	1st	P289
Victoria Belando Nicholson	Qld	18	1st	Debut
Ricky Betar	Qld	22	1st	P303
Lewis Bishop	Qld	21	1st	P325
Stephanie Bruzzese	NSW	19	1st	Debut
Declan Budd	NSW	18	1st	P329
Rowan Crothers	SA	28	3rd	P276
Jasmin Fullgrabe	SA	21	1st	Debut
Thomas Gallagher	Qld	27	1st	P313
Jasmine Greenwood	ACT	21	2nd	P298
Brenden Hall	Qld	33	4th	P246
Benjamin Hance	Qld	25	1st	P314
Kirralee Hayes	Qld	22	1st	P315
Timothy Hodge	NSW	25	2nd	P284
Jack Ireland	Qld	26	1st	P304
Jenna Jones	Qld	25	2nd	P292
Ahmed Kelly	Vic	34	4th	P264
Beau Matthews	NSW	17	1st	Debut
Madeleine McTernan	Qld	25	1st	P308
Jake Michel	Qld	28	1st	P309
Riley Moore	ACT	23	1st	Debut
Chloe Osborn	NSW	22	1st	P326
Grant Patterson	Qld	37	4th	P261
Lakeisha Patterson	Qld	27	3rd	P282
Col Pearse	Vic	22	1st	P310
Alex Saffy	ACT	20	1st	P319
Callum Simpson	Qld	19	1st	P327
Darren Sisman	NSW	19	1st	Debut
Amelie Springett-Kelly	NSW	18	1st	Debut
Keira Stephens	Qld	23	2nd	P302
Ruby Storm	Qld	22	1st	P311
Kael Thompson	Qld	19	1st	Debut
Liam Togher	NSW	17	1st	Debut
Alexander Tuckfield	NSW	21	1st	P316
Harrison Vig	Qld	23	1st	P322

== Broadcast ==
In January 2025, it was announced that the Nine Network has secured a ten-year multi-platform media agreement with Swimming Australia through to 2034. Both the morning heat sessions and evening final sessions were streamed live on 9Now. The commentary team consisted of Mat Thompson, Brenton Speed, Ian Thorpe, Giaan Rooney, Ellie Cole and Ariarne Titmus with Rooney, Cole and Titmus conducting the poolside interviews and Sylvia Jeffreys hosting the broadcast.
