= Swimming at the 2026 Commonwealth Games – Men's 800 metre freestyle =

Men's 800 metre freestyle at the 2026 Commonwealth Games
- Venue: Tollcross International Swimming Centre
- Dates: 27 July
- Winning time: 7:39.81

Medalists
gold medal	Samuel Short	Australia
silver medal	Ben Goedemans	Australia
bronze medal	Matthew Galea	Australia

The men's 800 metre freestyle event at the 2026 Commonwealth Games was held on 27 July at the Tollcross International Swimming Centre. This will be first time that a men's 800 metre freestyle will be contested at the Commonwealth Games with both this event and the women's 1500 metre freestyle added to the 2026 swimming program.

The inaugural title was won by Australian Sam Short, as Australia swept the podium as they had in the 400 metre freestyle, relegating the Irish Olympic champion, Daniel Wiffen to fourth.

== Records ==
Prior to this competition, the existing world, Commonwealth and Games records were as follows:

Records before the 2026 Commonwealth Games
Record	Time	Athlete (nation)	Meet	Location	Date	Ref
World record	7:32.12	Zhang Lin (CHN)	2009 World Championships	Rome, Italy	29 July 2009	
Commonwealth record	7:36.73	Samuel Short (AUS)	2026 Australian Trials	Sydney, Australia	10 June 2026	
Games record	N/A					

== Schedule ==
The schedule is as follows:

All times are British Summer Time (UTC+1)

Date	Time	Round
Monday 27 July 2026	10:30	Slower heats
Monday 27 July 2026	19:00	Fastest heat

== Results ==
=== Timed final ===
The 800 and 1500 metres events are held in a time trial format; swimmers with slower entry times swim in the morning 'heats', while the swimmers with the eight fastest entry times swim in the 'timed final' in the evening session. The times of all the swims are then combined to create a single final result.

Timed final results
Rank	Heat	Lane	Swimmer	Nation	Time	Notes
1st place, gold medalist(s)	2	4	Sam Short	Australia	7:39.81	
2nd place, silver medalist(s)	2	3	Benjamin Goedemans	Australia	7:46.49	
3rd place, bronze medalist(s)	2	6	Matthew Galea	Australia	7:47.10	
4	2	5	Daniel Wiffen	Northern Ireland	7:48.82	
5	2	1	Luke Hornsey	Scotland	7:59.58	
6	2	2	Tyler Melbourne-Smith	Wales	7:59.79	
7	1	7	Hoe Yean Khiew	Malaysia	8:04.47	
8	2	7	Aryan Nehra	India	8:07.26	
9	2	6	Sean McCann	Scotland	8:11.34	
10	1	4	Russel Pang	Singapore	8:13.47	
11	1	5	Samuel Sterry	Jersey	8:29.65	
12	1	3	Oscar Maddrell	Isle of Man	8:40.24	
13	1	6	Connor Macdonald	Cayman Islands	8:41.32	
14	1	1	Christian Chang-Chipolina	Gibraltar	9:19.83	
			William Caswell	Saint Helena		DNS
