= 2026 Pan Pacific Swimming Championships – Women's 200 metre butterfly =

Women's 200 metre butterfly at the 2026 Pan Pacific Swimming Championships
- Venue: William Woollett Jr. Aquatics Center
- Dates: August 12
- Competitors: 10 from 6 nations
- Winning time: 2:06.24

Medalists
gold medal	Brittany Castelluzzo	Australia
silver medal	Elizabeth Dekkers	Australia
bronze medal	Tess Howley	United States

Official Video (heats)

Official Video (B and A final)

The women's 200 metre butterfly event at the 2026 Pan Pacific Swimming Championships was held on August 12 at the William Woollett Jr. Aquatics Center in Irvine, California. The event was won by reigning Commonwealth Games champion Brittany Castelluzzo of Australia in a personal best time of 2:06.24, improving on the 2:06.56 set at the Commonwealth Games earlier that year. Her compatriot Elizabeth Dekkers claimed the silver medal in 2:06.56, finishing 0.32 seconds behind Castelluzzo, while American Tess Howley won the bronze medal in 2:07.43. Japan's Chiho Mizuguchi finished fourth in 2:08.40.

With only ten swimmers entered in the event, the main contest during the morning heats was between the three American swimmers competing for the two available places in the A final. Alex Shackell recorded the fastest qualifying time of 2:06.68, ahead of Howley, who finished second in 2:07.13. Their compatriot Caroline Bricker recorded the third-fastest time of 2:09.20 but was relegated to the B final due to the two-swimmers-per-nation restriction. In the evening session, Bricker won the B final in 2:07.94, a time that would have placed fourth in the A final. Despite entering the final as the fastest qualifier, Shackell finished fifth in 2:08.70, while Castelluzzo improved on her morning time of 2:09.27 to claim the gold medal.

== Records ==
Prior to this competition, the existing records were as follows:

Records before the 2026 Pan Pacific Swimming Championships
Record	Time	Athlete (nation)	Meet	Location	Date	Ref
World record	2:01.65	Summer McIntosh (CAN)	2026 Canadian Trials	Montreal, Canada	July 5, 2026	
Championship record	2:05.40	Jessicah Schipper (AUS)	2006 Pan Pacs	Victoria, Canada	August 17, 2006	

== Schedule ==
The schedule was as follows:

All times are Pacific Daylight Time (UTC-7)

Date	Time	Round
Wednesday, August 12, 2026	11:12	Heats
Wednesday, August 12, 2026	20:19	Finals

== Results ==
=== Heats ===
The heats were held at 11:12 on August 12, 2026.

Heat results
Rank	Heat	Lane	Swimmer	Nation	Time	Notes
1	1	5	Alex Shackell	United States	2:06.68	QA
2	1	4	Tess Howley	United States	2:07.13	QA
3	2	5	Caroline Bricker	United States	2:09.20	QB
4	2	3	Brittany Castelluzzo	Australia	2:09.27	QA
5	2	4	Elizabeth Dekkers	Australia	2:09.38	QA
6	1	3	Chiho Mizuguchi	Japan	2:10.12	QA
7	2	6	Misa Okuzono	Japan	2:11.10	QA
8	1	6	Yasmin Silva	Peru	2:14.65	QA
9	1	2	Applejean Gwinn	Chinese Taipei	2:18.49	QA
10	2	2	Leigh McMorran	South Africa	2:20.26	QB

=== B Final ===
The B final was held at 20:19 on August 12, 2026.

B Final results
Rank	Lane	Swimmer	Nation	Time	Notes
9	4	Caroline Bricker	United States	2:07.94	
10	5	Leigh McMorran	South Africa	2:20.45	

=== A Final ===
The A final was held after the B final on August 12, 2026.

A Final results
Rank	Lane	Swimmer	Nation	Time	Notes
1st place, gold medalist(s)	3	Brittany Castelluzzo	Australia	2:06.24	
2nd place, silver medalist(s)	6	Elizabeth Dekkers	Australia	2:06.56	
3rd place, bronze medalist(s)	5	Tess Howley	United States	2:07.43	
4	2	Chiho Mizuguchi	Japan	2:08.40	
5	4	Alex Shackell	United States	2:08.70	
6	7	Misa Okuzono	Japan	2:09.60	
7	1	Yasmin Silva	Peru	2:13.72	
8	8	Applejean Gwinn	Chinese Taipei	2:19.86	
