= Ben Goedemans =

Australian swimmer (born 2004)

Personal information
- Full name: Benjamin Goedemans
- Nationality: Australian
- Born: 13 May 2004 (age 22)

Sport
- Sport: Swimming
- Strokes: Freestyle
Medal record
Men's swimming
Representing Australia
Commonwealth Games
Silver medal – second place	2026 Glasgow	800 m freestyle
Bronze medal – third place	2026 Glasgow	400 m freestyle
Bronze medal – third place	2026 Glasgow	1500 m freestyle
Pan Pacific Championships
Bronze medal – third place	2026 Irvine	800 m freestyle

Benjamin Goedemans (born 13 May 2004) is an Australian swimmer.

== Career ==
In June 2026, he competed at the 2026 Australian Swimming Trials and won a silver medal in the 800 metre freestyle, and bronze medals in the 400 and 1500 metre freestyles. As a result, he was selected to represent Australia at the 2026 Commonwealth Games and 2026 Pan Pacific Swimming Championships. During the Commonwealth Games he won a silver medal in the 800 metre freestyle with a time of 7:46.49. He also won bronze medals in the 400 metre freestyle and 1500 metre freestyle. In August 2026, he competed at the 2026 Pan Pacific Swimming Championships and won a bronze medal in the 800 metre freestyle with a time of 7:44.67.
