= Sean McCann (swimmer) =

British swimmer (born 2005)

Personal information
- Born: 1 February 2005 (age 21) Leicester, England
- Education: Loughborough University
- Years active: 2024–present

Sport
- Country: (United Kingdom) Great Britain; Scotland
- Sport: Swimming

Sean McCann (born 1 February 2005) is a British competitive swimmer. He won the bronze medal in 800m freestyle at the 2026 Aquatics GB Swimming Championships and is representing Scotland at the 2026 Commonwealth Games, having previously swam for them at the Commonwealth Youth Games. He has also represented Great Britain in open water swimming.

== Early years ==
Sean McCann was born on 1 February 2005 to Kate and Gerry McCann. He was raised in Rothley, near Leicester, in England and has a twin sister, Amelie. When the twins were two years old, their older sister Madeleine disappeared while on a family holiday. McCann, who was sleeping in the same room as Madeleine at the time, has not publicly discussed his sister's disappearance. Like other members of his family, he has faced unsolicited approaches due to the profile of the disappearance.

Following a period of McCann's parents intensely focusing on the search for his older sister, they consciously began putting more effort into supporting the twins, whom they kept away from media scrutiny during their childhoods. The twins began practicing at the local Charnwood Triathlon Club when young, and McCann discovered a preference for the swimming aspect. He began to take swimming seriously when he was eight and trained at Loughborough Town Swimming Club. At nine years old, he watched the 2014 Commonwealth Games in Glasgow, and aged ten he was selected to the high-performance swimming programme at City of Leicester club. Here, he was one of few long-distance swimmers, and so often was alone in his training. Upon joining secondary school, he would train from 04:00 in the morning. McCann attended the De Lisle College for secondary school before then choosing Loughborough University for its strength in long-distance swimming and his chosen subject, chemical engineering.

He has been part of the Scottish Swimming programme since he was a teenager, for which he is eligible through his Glasgow-born father. His twin sister is a Team Scotland triathlete studying geography at Durham University.

== Career ==
At the 2023 Commonwealth Youth Games McCann reached the finals in both 400m and 1500m races, finishing fifth in the 400m freestyle. He is both a pool and open water swimmer, competing at the 2023 European Junior Open Water Swimming Championships and taking gold in the 1500m for the Open Water Development Squad at the 2024 Best Fest.

McCann competed at the 2024 British Swimming Championships, serving as qualifiers for the 2024 Summer Olympics. He qualified for the 2025 European Open Water Swimming Championships, where he contested but did not finish the 10km race. In April 2026 he won bronze at the British Championships in the men's 800 metres freestyle, coming fourth in the 1500m, before heading to the Scottish Championships in June where he won the 800m silver. He then represented Scotland at the 2026 Commonwealth Games at home in Glasgow. In his first event, the 400m, he was a surprise qualifier for the final after finishing fourth in his heat to make the eighth-fastest qualifying time; he finished eighth in the final, 12 seconds behind gold medalist Sam Short.
