= Swimming at the 2022 Commonwealth Games – Women's 200 metre butterfly =

Women's 200 metre butterfly at the 2022 Commonwealth Games
- Venue: Sandwell Aquatics Centre
- Date: 2 August 2022
- Competitors: 14 from 9 nations
- Winning time: 2:07.26

Medalists
gold medal	Elizabeth Dekkers	Australia
silver medal	Laura Stephens	England
bronze medal	Brianna Throssell	Australia

The women's 200 metre butterfly event at the 2022 Commonwealth Games was held on 2 August at the Sandwell Aquatics Centre.

== Records ==
Prior to this competition, the existing world, Commonwealth and Games records were as follows:

World record	Liu Zige (CHN)	2:01.81	Jinan, China	21 October 2009
Commonwealth record	Jessicah Schipper (AUS)	2:03.41	Rome, Italy	30 July 2009
Games record	Alys Thomas (WAL)	2:05.45	Gold Coast, Australia	9 April 2018

== Schedule ==
The schedule is as follows:

All times are British Summer Time (UTC+1)

Date	Time	Round
Tuesday 2 August 2022	10:42	Heats
Tuesday 2 August 2022	19:20	Final

== Results ==
=== Heats ===
Rank	Heat	Lane	Name	Nationality	Time	Notes
1	2	4	Elizabeth Dekkers	Australia	2:07.62	Q
2	1	4	Laura Stephens	England	2:09.60	Q
3	2	3	Abbey Connor	Australia	2:09.69	Q
4	2	2	Holly Hibbott	England	2:10.49	Q
5	2	5	Brianna Throssell	Australia	2:10.92	Q
6	2	7	Mabel Zavaros	Canada	2:10.94	Q
7	1	3	Keanna Macinnes	Scotland	2:11.15	Q
8	1	5	Alys Thomas	Wales	2:11.43	Q
9	1	6	Ella Jansen	Canada	2:11.51	R
10	1	2	Duné Coetzee	South Africa	2:12.40	R
11	2	6	Quah Jing Wen	Singapore	2:12.89	
12	1	7	Trinity Hearne	South Africa	2:14.82	
13	2	1	Orla Rabey	Guernsey	2:20.18	
14	1	1	Zaira Forson	Ghana	2:45.50	

=== Final ===
Rank	Lane	Name	Nationality	Time	Notes
1st place, gold medalist(s)	4	Elizabeth Dekkers	Australia	2:07.26	
2nd place, silver medalist(s)	5	Laura Stephens	England	2:07.90	
3rd place, bronze medalist(s)	2	Brianna Throssell	Australia	2:08.32	
4	3	Abbey Connor	Australia	2:08.36	
5	6	Holly Hibbott	England	2:09.92	
6	8	Alys Thomas	Wales	2:10.42	
7	1	Keanna Macinnes	Scotland	2:10.79	
8	7	Mabel Zavaros	Canada	2:12.23	
