= Swimming at the 2026 Commonwealth Games – Women's 200 metre butterfly =

Women's 200 metre butterfly at the 2026 Commonwealth Games
- Venue: Tollcross International Swimming Centre
- Dates: 29 July
- Winning time: 2:06.56

Medalists
gold medal	Brittany Castelluzzo	Australia
silver medal	Keanna Macinnes	Scotland
bronze medal	Elizabeth Dekkers	Australia

The women's 200 metre butterfly event at the 2026 Commonwealth Games was held on 29 July at the Tollcross International Swimming Centre.

== Schedule ==
The schedule is as follows:

All times are British Summer Time (UTC+1)

Date	Time	Round
Wednesday 29 July 2022	10:30	Heats
Wednesday 29 July 2022	19:00	Final

== Results ==
=== Heats ===
The heats was held on the morning of 29 July 2026.

Heat results
Rank	Heat	Lane	Swimmer	Nation	Time	Notes
1	2	3	Ciara Schlosshan	Scotland	2:08.47	Q
2	2	4	Elizabeth Dekkers	Australia	2:08.64	Q
3	2	5	Keanna Macinnes	Scotland	2:08.99	Q
4	1	4	Brittany Castelluzzo	Australia	2:10.46	Q
5	1	5	Emily Richards	England	2:11.15	Q
6	1	3	Jessica Cole	Australia	2:11.36	Q
7	2	6	Lucy Fox	England	2:12.09	Q
8	1	6	Ella Jansen	Canada	2:12.32	Q
9	2	7	Dune Coetzee	South Africa	2:18.85	R
10	2	2	Faye Rogers	Scotland	2:21.38	R
11	1	2	Oriana Wheeler	Guernsey	2:24.08	
12	2	1	Clara Ginnis	Jersey	2:27.32	
	1	7	Jaiya Simmons	Barbados	DNS	

=== Final ===
The final took place during of the evening of 29 July 2026.

Final results
Rank	Lane	Swimmer	Nation	Time	Notes
1st place, gold medalist(s)	6	Brittany Castelluzzo	Australia	2:06.56	
2nd place, silver medalist(s)	3	Keanna Macinnes	Scotland	2:06.76	
3rd place, bronze medalist(s)	5	Elizabeth Dekkers	Australia	2:06.91	
4	4	Ciara Schlosshan	Scotland	2:08.39	
5	2	Emily Richards	England	2:09.12	
6	7	Jessica Cole	Australia	2:11.17	
7	8	Ella Jansen	Canada	2:11.23	
8	1	Lucy Fox	England	2:12.18	
