= Swimming at the 2026 Commonwealth Games – Men's 1500 metre freestyle =

Men's 1500 metre freestyle at the 2026 Commonwealth Games
- Venue: Tollcross International Swimming Centre
- Dates: 29 July
- Winning time: 14:42.11

Medalists
gold medal	Sam Short	Australia
silver medal	Daniel Wiffen	Northern Ireland
bronze medal	Benjamin Goedemans	Australia

The men's 1500 metre freestyle event at the 2026 Commonwealth Games was held on 29 July at the Tollcross International Swimming Centre.

== Records ==
Prior to this competition, the existing world, Commonwealth and Games records were as follows:

Records before the 2026 Commonwealth Games
Record	Time	Athlete (nation)	Meet	Location	Date	Ref
World record	14:30.67	Bobby Finke (USA)	2024 Olympics	Paris, France	4 August 2024	
Commonwealth record	14:34.56	Ian Thorpe (AUS)	2001 World Championships	Fukuoka, Japan	29 July 2001	
Games record	14:41.66	Kieren Perkins (AUS)	1994 Commonwealth Games	Victoria, British Columbia, Canada	24 August 1994	

== Schedule ==
The schedule is as follows:

All times are British Summer Time (UTC+1)

Date	Time	Round
Wednesday 29 July 2026	10:30	Slower heats
Wednesday 29 July 2026	19:00	Fastest heat

== Results ==
=== Timed final ===
The 800 and 1500 metres events are held in a time trial format; swimmers with slower entry times swim in the morning 'heats', while the swimmers with the eight fastest entry times swim in the 'timed final' in the evening session. The times of all the swims are then combined to create a single final result.

Timed final results
Rank	Heat	Lane	Swimmer	Nation	Time	Notes
1st place, gold medalist(s)	2	4	Sam Short	Australia	14:42.11	
2nd place, silver medalist(s)	2	5	Daniel Wiffen	Northern Ireland	14:44.70	
3rd place, bronze medalist(s)	2	6	Benjamin Goedemans	Australia	14:49.50	
4	2	3	Matthew Galea	Australia	15:00.69	
5	2	1	Russel Pang	Singapore	15:25.58	
6	1	5	Hoe Yean Khiew	Malaysia	15:29.30	
7	2	7	Luke Hornsey	Scotland	15:31.05	
8	2	2	Aryan Nehra	India	15:36.25	
9	2	8	Oscar Maddrell	Isle of Man	16:34.50	
10	1	4	Connor MacDonald	Cayman Islands	16:40.92	
