= Brittany Castelluzzo =

Australian swimmer

Personal information
- Full name: Brittany Castelluzzo
- Born: 26 November 2000 (age 25)

Sport
- Sport: Swimming
- Strokes: Butterfly, freestyle
- Club: Tea Tree Gully Swimming Club
- Coach: Craig Stewart
Medal record
Women's swimming
Representing Australia
Event	1st	2nd	3rd
World Championships (LC)	1	0	0
World Championships (SC)	1	1	0
Pan Pacific Championships	1	0	0
Commonwealth Games	4	0	0
Total	7	1	0
World Championships (LC)
Gold medal – first place	2025 Singapore	4×200 m freestyle
World Championships (SC)
Gold medal – first place	2022 Melbourne	4×200 m freestyle
Silver medal – second place	2022 Melbourne	4×50 m freestyle
Pan Pacific Championships
Gold medal – first place	2026 Irvine	200 m butterfly
Commonwealth Games
Gold medal – first place	2026 Glasgow	200 m butterfly
Gold medal – first place	2026 Glasgow	4×100 m freestyle
Gold medal – first place	2026 Glasgow	4×100 m medley
Gold medal – first place	2026 Glasgow	4×100 m mixed medley

Brittany Castelluzzo (born 26 November 2000) is an Australian swimmer competing primarily in butterfly and freestyle events. She is a World Aquatics Championships gold medallist in the long-course 4 × 200 metre freestyle relay and a two-time World Short Course Championships medallist.

== Career ==
Castelluzzo represents the Tea Tree Gully Swimming Club in South Australia and trains with the South Australian Sports Institute (SASI) in Adelaide under coach Craig Stewart. She is designated as Australian Dolphin number 842.

At the 2022 World Short Course Championships in Melbourne, Castelluzzo competed for Australia, winning a gold medal as a member of the 4 × 200 m freestyle relay team and a silver medal in the 4 × 50 m freestyle relay.

During the Singapore leg of the 2024 World Aquatics Swimming World Cup, she won the short-course 200 m butterfly in 2:03.44 and placed third in the 200 m freestyle with a time of 1:53.70.

In 2025, Castelluzzo won the 200 m butterfly at the Australian Open Championships in a personal best time of 2:06.86. At the subsequent selection trials, she recorded a time of 2:06.91 to qualify for her long-course World Championships debut in Singapore. At the 2025 World Aquatics Championships, she reached the semifinals of the 200 m butterfly, placing ninth overall in 2:08.04. She also swam in both the heats and final of the women's 4 × 200 m freestyle relay; in the final, she recorded a split of 1:56.01, regaining the lead over the United States during the final 50 metres to help Australia secure the gold medal in 7:39.35. Following the season, SASI named her its 2025 Female Athlete of the Year.

At the 2026 Victorian Open Championships, Castelluzzo won four individual titles: the 100 m freestyle (54.30), 100 m butterfly (57.99), 200 m butterfly (2:07.89), and 200 m freestyle (1:57.64), while placing third in the 800 m freestyle. At the 2026 Australian Swimming Trials, she placed second in both the 200 m butterfly (2:06.95) and 100 m butterfly (57.88), earning selection for the Commonwealth Games and Pan Pacific Championships.

At the 2026 Commonwealth Games in Glasgow, she swam the second leg of Australia's heat in the women's 4 × 100 m freestyle relay, splitting 53.63 to help Australia qualify fastest for the final. Australia went on to win the gold medal in the final in 3:31.40.
