= Swimming at the 2026 Commonwealth Games – Men's 400 metre freestyle =

Men's 400 metre freestyle at the 2026 Commonwealth Games
- Venue: Tollcross International Swimming Centre
- Dates: 25 July
- Winning time: 3:41.25

Medalists
gold medal	Sam Short	Australia
silver medal	Elijah Winnington	Australia
bronze medal	Ben Goedemans	Australia

The men's 400 metre freestyle event at the 2026 Commonwealth Games was held on 25 July at the Tollcross International Swimming Centre. The event was won by Sam Short, heading an Australian 1-2-3.

== Records ==
Prior to this competition, the existing world, Commonwealth and Games records were as follows:

Records before the 2026 Commonwealth Games
Record	Time	Athlete (nation)	Meet	Location	Date	Ref
World record	3:39.96	Lukas Märtens (GER)	Swim Open Stockholm	Stockholm, Sweden	12 April 2025	
Commonwealth record	3:40.08	Ian Thorpe (AUS)	2002 Commonwealth Games	Manchester, England	30 July 2002	
Games record	3:40.08	Ian Thorpe (AUS)	2002 Commonwealth Games	Manchester, England	30 July 2002	

== Schedule ==
The schedule is as follows:

All times are British Summer Time (UTC+1)

Date	Time	Round
Saturday 25 July 2026	10:30	Heats
Saturday 25 July 2026	19:00	Final

== Results ==
=== Heats ===
The heats will be held on the morning of 25 July 2026.

Heat results
Rank	Heat	Lane	Swimmer	Nation	Time	Notes
1	4	4	Sam Short	Australia	3:46.23	Q
2	3	5	Ben Goedemans	Australia	3:46.47	Q
3	3	3	Daniel Wiffen	Northern Ireland	3:47.01	Q
4	3	4	Elijah Winnington	Australia	3:47.84	Q
5	4	5	James Guy	England	3:48.21	Q
6	4	6	Tyler Melbourne-Smith	Wales	3:48.35	Q
7	4	3	Jack McMillan	Northern Ireland	3:48.65	Q
8	3	2	Sean McCann	Scotland	3:52.65	Q
9	4	2	Luke Hornsey	Scotland	3:53.72	R
10	3	6	Hoe Yean Khiew	Malaysia	3:54.23	R
11	4	7	Lorne Wigginton	Canada	3:55.44	
12	3	7	Charlie Hutchison	Scotland	3:55.69	
13	4	1	Russel Pang	Singapore	3:57.43	
14	2	2	Tan Khai Xin	Malaysia	3:57.54	
15	3	8	Dhakshan Shashikumar	India	3:58.09	
16	4	8	Aryan Nehra	India	4:00.26	
17	2	4	Samuel Sterry	Jersey	4:00.72	
18	3	1	Kris Mihaylov	South Africa	4:01.09	
19	2	5	Connor Macdonald	Cayman Islands	4:09.64	
20	2	3	Oscar Maddrell	Isle of Man	4:14.49	
21	1	4	Kajol Mia	Bangladesh	4:14.69	
22	2	7	Muhammad Durrani	Pakistan	4:14.85	
23	1	3	Will Sellars	Cayman Islands	4:20.01	
24	2	6	Zachary Maiden	Guernsey	4:22.81	
25	2	8	Adam Burns	Gibraltar	4:30.52	
26	2	1	Christian Chang-Chipolina	Gibraltar	4:34.15	
27	1	5	William Caswell	Saint Helena	4:38.43	

=== Final ===
The final took place during of the evening of 25 July 2026.

Final results
Rank	Lane	Swimmer	Nation	Time	Notes
1st place, gold medalist(s)	4	Sam Short	Australia	3:41.25	
2nd place, silver medalist(s)	6	Elijah Winnington	Australia	3:45.56	
3rd place, bronze medalist(s)	5	Ben Goedemans	Australia	3:45.57	
4	2	James Guy	England	3:46.70	
5	3	Daniel Wiffen	Northern Ireland	3:47.22	
6	7	Tyler Melbourne-Smith	Wales	3:48.54	
7	1	Jack McMillan	Northern Ireland	3:49.18	
8	8	Sean McCann	Scotland	3:53.47	
