= Emily Richards (swimmer) =

British swimmer (born 2001)

Personal information
- Nationality: British (English)
- Born: February 1, 2001 (age 25) Newcastle upon Tyne, Great Britain
- Spouse: Matt Richards (m. 2024)

Sport
- Sport: Swimming
- Strokes: Butterfly
Medal record
Women's swimming
Representing Great Britain
European Championships (LC)
Gold medal – first place	2026 Paris	4×100 m medley
World Junior Championships
Gold medal – first place	2017 Indianapolis	200 m butterfly
European Junior Championships
Gold medal – first place	2016 Hódmezővásárhely	200 m butterfly
Gold medal – first place	2018 Helsinki	100 m butterfly
Gold medal – first place	2018 Helsinki	4x100 m medley
Silver medal – second place	2018 Helsinki	4x100 m mixed medley
Bronze medal – third place	2016 Hódmezővásárhely	4x100 m freestyle
Bronze medal – third place	2016 Hódmezővásárhely	4x100 m mixed medley
European Youth Olympic Festival
Silver medal – second place	2015 Tbilisi	200 m butterfly

Emily Louise Richards (née Large) (born 1 February 2001) is a British swimmer.

== Biography ==
Richards is from Newcastle upon Tyne and attended Kings Priory School in Tynemouth. A butterfly specialist, she represented Great Britain in the women's 200 metre butterfly at the 2023 World Aquatics Championships.

On 22 August 2024, she married fellow Team GB swimmer Matt Richards and competed under her married name thereafter.

In 2025, Richards finished second behind Keanna Macinnes in the 200 metres butterfly at the 2025 Aquatics GB Swimming Championships, which earned selection for the 2025 World Aquatics Championships in Singapore. Subsequently at the World Championships, she reached the final of the 200 metres butterfly.
