= Lake Patterson =

Lake in the state of Minnesota, United States

- Location within Minnesota
- Location: Carver County, Minnesota
- Coordinates: 44°50′0″N 93°52′10″W
- Type: lake

Lake Patterson is a lake in Carver County, Minnesota, in the United States.

Lake Patterson was named for William Patterson, a pioneer settler.
