= Tristan Hollard =

Australian swimmer

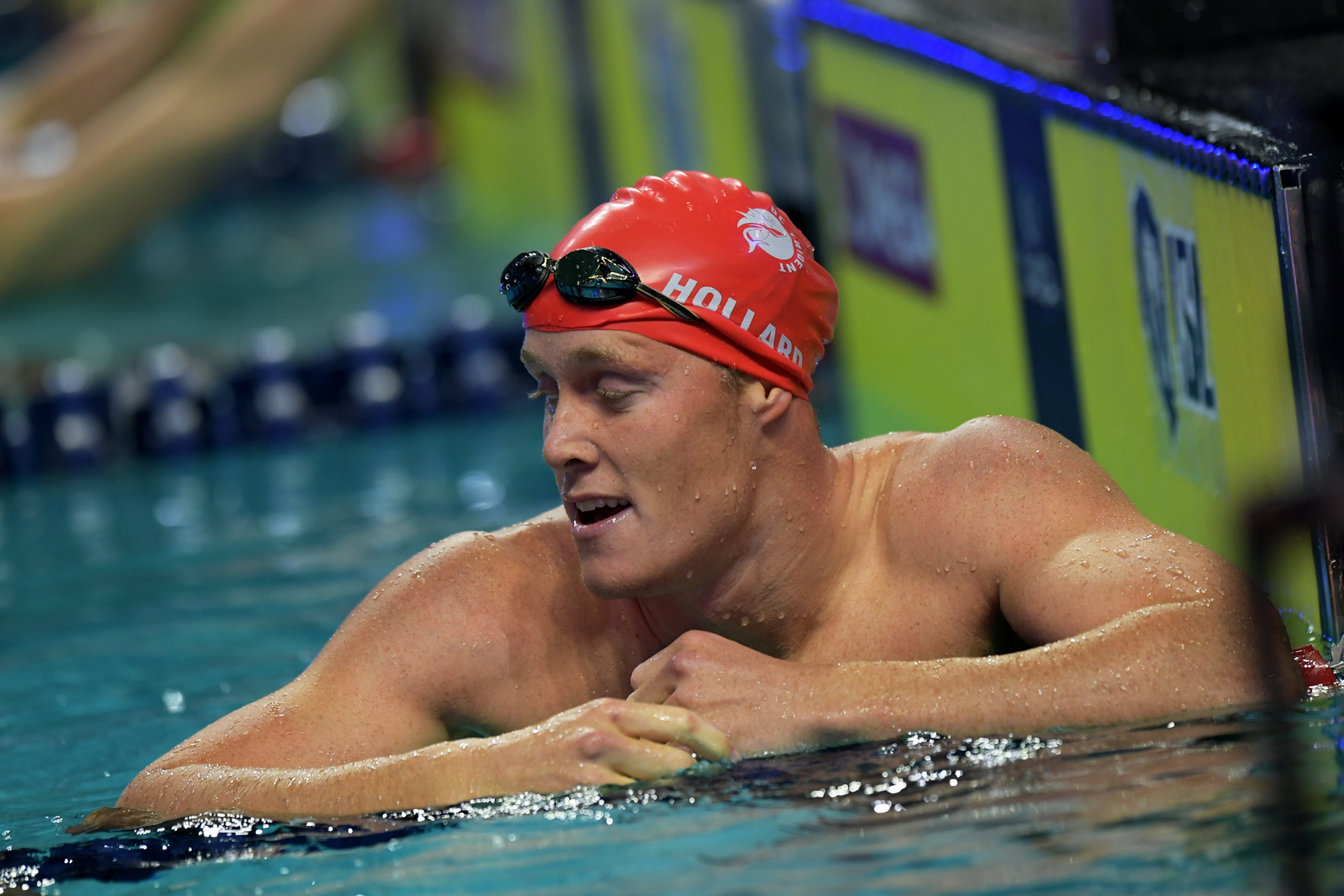
- Tristan Hollard after finishing a race for DC Trident in an ISL meet.

Personal information
- Full name: Tristan Jason Hollard
- Nationality: Australian
- Born: 23 November 1996 (age 29) Australia

Sport
- Sport: Swimming
- Strokes: Backstroke
- Club: DC Trident; Southport Olympic
- College team: University of Griffith

Tristan Jason Hollard (born 23 November 1996) is an Australian competitive swimmer who specializes in the backstroke events. He currently represents the DC Trident which is part of the International Swimming League.

== International career ==
=== International Swimming League (ISL) ===
Hollard was a member of the inaugural International Swimming League (ISL) representing DC Trident. He competed at the first two matches held in Indianapolis, Indiana, and Naples, Italy, respectively, as well as in the American Derby held in College Park, Maryland.
