= Elijah Winnington =

Australian swimmer (born 2000)

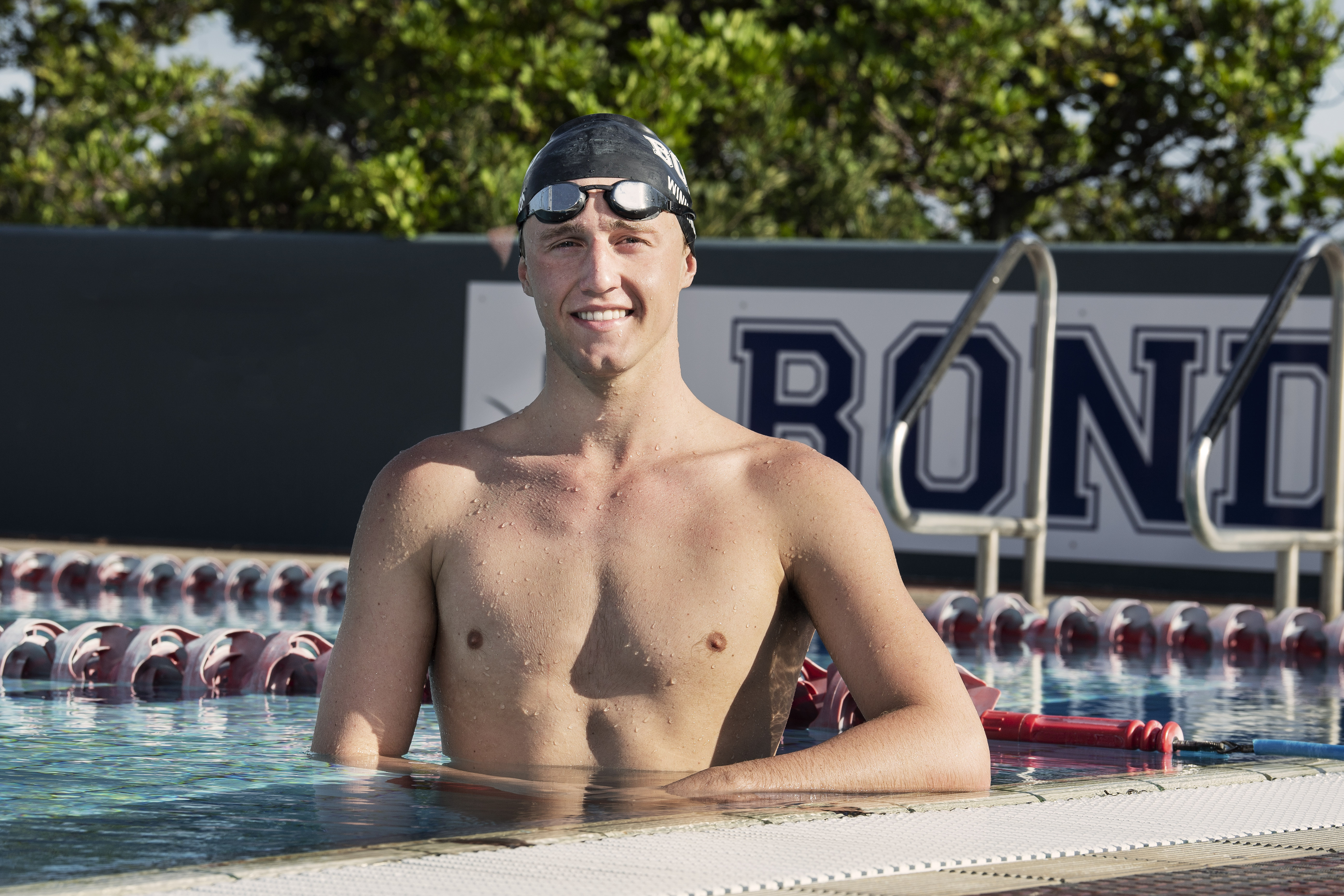
- Winnington on the Gold Coast, Australia

Personal information
- Nicknames: Lij, Lijo
- National team: Australia
- Born: 5 May 2000 (age 26) Gold Coast, Queensland, Australia
- Height: 1.86 m (6 ft 1 in)

Sport
- Sport: Swimming
- Strokes: Freestyle
- Club: St Peters Western
- Coach: Dean Boxall
Medal record
| Event | 1st | 2nd | 3rd |
|---|---|---|---|
| Olympic Games | 0 | 1 | 2 |
| World Championships (LC) | 1 | 3 | 1 |
| World Championships (SC) | 1 | 1 | 0 |
| Pan Pacific Championships | 0 | 0 | 0 |
| Commonwealth Games | 5 | 1 | 1 |
| Junior World Championships (LC) | 0 | 0 | 3 |
| Total | 7 | 6 | 7 |
Men's swimming
Representing Australia
Olympic Games
| Silver medal – second place | 2024 Paris | 400 m freestyle |
| Bronze medal – third place | 2020 Tokyo | 4×200 m freestyle |
| Bronze medal – third place | 2024 Paris | 4x200 m freestyle |
World Championships (LC)
| Gold medal – first place | 2022 Budapest | 400 m freestyle |
| Silver medal – second place | 2022 Budapest | 4×200 m freestyle |
| Silver medal – second place | 2024 Doha | 400 m freestyle |
| Silver medal – second place | 2024 Doha | 800 m freestyle |
| Bronze medal – third place | 2023 Fukuoka | 4×200 m freestyle |
World Championships (SC)
| Gold medal – first place | 2024 Budapest | 400 m freestyle |
| Silver medal – second place | 2024 Budapest | 4×200 m freestyle |
Commonwealth Games
| Gold medal – first place | 2018 Gold Coast | 4×200 m freestyle |
| Gold medal – first place | 2022 Birmingham | 400 m freestyle |
| Gold medal – first place | 2022 Birmingham | 4×100 m freestyle |
| Gold medal – first place | 2022 Birmingham | 4×200 m freestyle |
| Gold medal – first place | 2026 Glasgow | 4×200 m freestyle |
| Silver medal – second place | 2026 Glasgow | 400 m freestyle |
| Bronze medal – third place | 2022 Birmingham | 200 m freestyle |
World Junior Championships
| Bronze medal – third place | 2017 Indianapolis | 200 m freestyle |
| Bronze medal – third place | 2017 Indianapolis | 4×100 m freestyle |
| Bronze medal – third place | 2017 Indianapolis | 4×100 m medley |
Junior Pan Pacific Championships
| Gold medal – first place | 2016 Maui | 4×200 m freestyle |
| Silver medal – second place | 2016 Maui | 4×100 m freestyle |

Elijah Winnington (born 5 May 2000) is an Australian competitive swimmer who specialises in the sprint freestyle events. He has competed in the 2018 Commonwealth Games, Pan Pacific Swimming Championships, FINA World Junior Swimming Championships, 2020 Summer Olympics, and 2022 World Aquatics Championships.

== Background ==
Winnington was born in Gold Coast, Queensland. He went to King's Christian College, graduating in 2017. Winnington eventually swam under Richard Spence at Bond Swimming Club for a couple of years until changing to St Peter's Western under Dean Boxall.

== Career ==
Winnington won three bronze medals at the 2017 FINA World Junior Swimming Championships in the 200 m freestyle and the 4 × 100 m freestyle and 4 × 100 m medley relays. Winnington's breakthrough would come at the 2018 Commonwealth Games where he won gold in the 4 × 200 m freestyle relay alongside Kyle Chalmers, Alexander Graham and Mack Horton. The relay team's time of 7:05.97 was a games record.

In 2019, Winnington would compete at the 2019 Australian Swimming Championships, winning gold in the 400 m freestyle event and silver in the 200 m freestyle event. Two years later, at the 2021 Australian Swimming Championships, Winnington would retain his title in the 400 m freestyle event and won bronze in the 200 m freestyle event.

=== 2020 Summer Olympics ===
At the 2021 Australian Swimming Trials, Winnington competed in the 50 m, 100 m, 200 m, 400 m and 800 m freestyle events. He qualified for the Olympic team in the 200 m and 400 m events, coming first in the 400 m event and second in the 200 m. Although Winnington qualified with the fastest time in the world for the 400m freestyle, he failed to claim a medal in the final.

=== 2022 World Aquatics Championships ===
Winnington won his first international gold medal in the 400m freestyle during the 2022 World Aquatics Championships in Budapest, Hungary. He swam a personal best time of 3:41.22 in the final, which was the 5th fastest time in the history of the men's 400m freestyle (long course). Winnington also won bronze in the 4 × 200 m freestyle relay.
