= Daniel Cave =

Australian swimmer

Personal information
- Born: 9 February 1999 (age 27)

Sport
- Sport: Swimming
Medal record
Representing Australia
World Championships (LC)
Silver medal – second place	2017 Budapest	4x100 m mixed medley

Daniel Cave (born 9 February 1999) is an Australian swimmer. He competed in the men's 100 metre breaststroke event at the 2017 World Aquatics Championships.
