= Elizabeth Dekkers =

Australian swimmer (born 2004)

Personal information
- Nationality: Australian
- Born: 6 May 2004 (age 22) South Brisbane, Queensland, Australia

Sport
- Sport: Swimming
- Strokes: Butterfly
Medal record
Women's swimming
Representing Australia
World Championships (LC)
Silver medal – second place	2023 Fukuoka	200 m butterfly
Bronze medal – third place	2025 Singapore	200 m butterfly
World Championships (SC)
Bronze medal – third place	2022 Melbourne	200 m butterfly
Bronze medal – third place	2024 Budapest	200 m butterfly
Bronze medal – third place	2024 Budapest	4×200 m freestyle
Pan Pacific Championships
Silver medal – second place	2026 Irvine	200 m butterfly
Commonwealth Games
Gold medal – first place	2022 Birmingham	200 m butterfly
Bronze medal – third place	2026 Glasgow	200 m butterfly

Elizabeth Dekkers (born 6 May 2004) is an Australian swimmer. At the 2022 Commonwealth Games, she won the gold medal in the 200 m butterfly.

== Biography ==
Dekkers is from South Brisbane, Queensland.

She was selected for the 2022 Commonwealth Games in Birmingham, where she competed in the 200m butterfly, reaching the final and winning the gold medal.

At the 2022 World Short Course Championships in Melbourne Dekkers earned a bronze medal by finishing third in the 200 metre butterfly with a time of 2:03.94. She finished 0.57 seconds behind the winner Dakota Luther.

The following year at the 2023 World Championships in Fukuoka, Japan Dekkers earned a silver medal in the 200 m butterfly with a time of 2:05.46 when she finished second to Canadian Summer McIntosh and ahead of American Regan Smith who was third.

At the 2025 Australian Trials, Dekkers recorded 2:07.36 to finish third in the 200 m butterfly, which was outside the top-2 finish required to qualify for the 2025 World Championships in Singapore. However, second-place finisher Abbey Connor later withdrew from the team, and Dekkers was named to replace her.
