= Samuel Short =

Australian swimmer

Personal information
- Nationality: Australian
- Born: 17 September 2003 (age 22) Queensland, Australia

Sport
- Sport: Swimming
- Strokes: Freestyle
Medal record
Men's swimming
Representing Australia
World Championships (LC)
Gold medal – first place	2023 Fukuoka	400 m freestyle
Silver medal – second place	2022 Budapest	4×200 m freestyle
Silver medal – second place	2023 Fukuoka	800 m freestyle
Silver medal – second place	2025 Singapore	400 m freestyle
Bronze medal – third place	2023 Fukuoka	1500 m freestyle
Commonwealth Games
Gold medal – first place	2022 Birmingham	1500 m freestyle
Gold medal – first place	2026 Glasgow	400 m freestyle
Gold medal – first place	2026 Glasgow	800 m freestyle
Gold medal – first place	2026 Glasgow	1500 m freestyle
Gold medal – first place	2026 Glasgow	4×200 m freestyle
Silver medal – second place	2022 Birmingham	400 m freestyle
Pan Pacific Championships
Gold medal – first place	2026 Irvine	400 m freestyle
Gold medal – first place	2026 Irvine	800 m freestyle
Gold medal – first place	2026 Irvine	1500 m freestyle
Silver medal – second place	2026 Irvine	4×200 m freestyle

Samuel Short (born 17 September 2003) is an Australian competitive swimmer. He won the gold medal in the 400 m freestyle at the 2023 World Championships, and is the Australian record holder in the 800 m freestyle.

== Career ==
=== 2022 ===
In May 2022, Short competed at the Australian Championships in Adelaide. He came third in the 400 m freestyle with a personal best of 3:44.34. He then came second in the 800 m freestyle in a time of 7:48.65, another personal best. On the final day of competition, Short swam the 1500 m freestyle. He unintentionally stopped swimming at the 1400 m mark, but later resumed swimming and won the event. His final time was slower than the qualifying time, but he was granted a place in the event since he was already on the team and had met the qualifying time during a previous competition.

In June 2022, Short competed at the World Championships in Budapest. In the 800 m freestyle, he finished ninth in a time of 7:48.28, missing the final by 0.82 seconds. He then swam the third leg of the 4 × 200 m freestyle relay, splitting 1:46.44. Australia won the silver medal in an overall time of 7:03.50. His final event was the 1500 m freestyle, where he finished fourteenth.

In August 2022, at the Commonwealth Games in Birmingham, Short won the silver medal in the 400 m freestyle in a time of 3:45.07. He later won the gold medal in the 1500 m freestyle with a personal best time of 14:48.54.

=== 2023 ===
In April 2023, at the Australian Championships on the Gold Coast, Short went a personal best of 3:42.46 in the 400 m freestyle. He later swam the 800 m freestyle, recording 7:42.96 for another personal best.

In June 2023, Short competed at the Australian Trials in Melbourne, Short won the 800 m freestyle in 7:40.39, breaking Ian Thorpe's Australian Allcomers record of 7:41.59 from 2001. In his final event of the competition, Short went a personal best time of 14:46.67 in the 1500 m freestyle.

In July 2023, Short competed at the 2023 World Championships in Fukuoka. In the 400 m freestyle, he qualified fastest for the final with a personal best time of 3:42.44. In the final, he won the gold medal by 0.02 seconds, recording a time of 3:40.68 to become the fifth-fastest swimmer in history. His next event was the 800 m freestyle, where he won the silver medal. His time of 7:37.76 was a new Australian record, surpassing Grant Hackett's mark of 7:38.65 from 2005. Short's final event was the 1500 m freestyle, where he won bronze in 14:37.28, another personal best time.

=== 2024–2025 ===
At the 2024 Olympics in Paris, Short was recovering from gastroenteritis. He finished fourth in the 400 m freestyle with a time of 3:42.64, 0.14 seconds behind the bronze medalist. Two days later, he recorded a time of 7:46.75 to finish ninth in the 800 m freestyle, missing the final by 1.24 seconds. His final event was the 1500 m freestyle, where he came thirteenth.

At the 2025 World Championships in Singapore, Short won the silver medal in the 400 m freestyle with a time of 3:42.37, 0.02 seconds behind the gold medalist. He swam the heats of the 800 m freestyle, qualifying second-fastest for the final with a time of 7:42.22. He later withdrew from the final, however, due to foodborne illness. He returned to competition in the 1500 m freestyle, recording 14:43.08 to finish fourth in the final.
