= 2024 Australian Swimming Trials =

Swimming competition

- Host city: Brisbane, Queensland
- Date: 10–15 June 2024
- Venue: Brisbane Aquatic Centre

The 2024 Australian Swimming Trials was a sports event that is being held from 10 to 15 June 2024 at the Brisbane Aquatic Centre to determine Australia's swimming team to the 2024 Summer Olympics and 2024 Paralympics.

== Olympic Qualification criteria ==
Australia can select a maximum of 52 swimmers (26 of each sex, with up to 12 for relay only swimmers) for the Olympic team. To qualify, a swimmer must reach the allotted Olympic Qualifying Time (OQT) and finish in the top 2 positions in the "A" final. Following the end of the qualification period, FINA will assess the number of athletes having achieved the OQT, the number of relay-only swimmers, and the number of Universality places, before inviting athletes with OST to fulfil the total quota of 852. Additionally, OST places will be distributed by event according to the position of the FINA World Rankings during the qualifying deadline.

=== Olympic Qualifying Times ===
Men's events				Women's events			
Event	Trials OQT	FINA A-Cut	FINA OST	Event	Trials OQT	FINA A-Cut	FINA OST
50 m freestyle	21.88	21.96	22.07	50 m freestyle	24.67	24.70	24.82
100 m freestyle	48.06	48.34	48.58	100 m freestyle	53.61	53.61	53.88
200 m freestyle	1:45.97	1:46.26	1:46.79	200 m freestyle	1:56.49	1:57.26	1:57.85
400 m freestyle	3:45.43	3:46.78	3:47.91	400 m freestyle	4:04.98	4:07.90	4:09.14
800 m freestyle	7:45.80	7:51.65	7:54.01	800 m freestyle	8:22.20	8:26.71	8:29.24
1500 m freestyle	14:54.29	15:00.99	15:05.49	1500 m freestyle	16:01.95	16:09.09	16:13.94
100 m backstroke	53.21	53.74	54.01	100 m backstroke	59.62	59.99	1:00.29
200 m backstroke	1:57.28	1:57.50	1:58.09	200 m backstroke	2:09.74	2:10.39	2:11.04
100 m breaststroke	59.49	59.49	59.79	100 m breaststroke	1:06.31	1:06.79	1:07.12
200 m breaststroke	2:09.50	2:09.68	2:10.33	200 m breaststroke	2:23.91	2:23.91	2:24.63
100 m butterfly	51.17	51.67	51.93	100 m butterfly	57.17	57.92	58.21
200 m butterfly	1:54.97	1:55.78	1:56.36	200 m butterfly	2:07.72	2:08.43	2:09.07
200 m individual medley	1:57.23	1:57.94	1:58.53	200 m individual medley	2:10.62	2:11.47	2:12.13
400 m individual medley	4:12.50	4:12.50	4:13.76	400 m individual medley	4:38.53	4:38.53	4:39.92

- Information retrieved from Swimming Australia and from Swimming at the 2024 Summer Olympics – Qualification.

== Paralympic Qualification criteria ==
Qualification requirements to be included in the Paralympic team is decided upon different classifications based on the degree of impairment an athlete experiences relative to an able-bodied swimmer's speed and performance. The three impairment groups at the Paralympic Games for swimming are physical, vision and intellectual. In addition, strokes and events are classified under "sport classes" that have a prefix letter and number. At the 2024 trials, qualification is selected based on a points system rather than time. Swimmers earn points based on how close they are to the world record in their respective qualification. This system is called the Multi-Class Point Score.

=== Event key ===
There are three swimming sport class prefixes for swimming strokes:

- S is for freestyle, butterfly and backstroke events.
- SB is for breaststroke
- SM is for individual medley events.

As well as swimming strokes, they are also divided into ten different categories:

- S1/SB1: swimmers who may have tetraplegia or some form of loss of muscular power in their legs, arms and hands. These swimmers would regularly use a wheelchair.
- S2/SB1: swimmers who may have limited function in their hands, trunk and legs and mainly rely on their arms to swim.
- S3/SB2: swimmers who have leg or arm amputations, have severe coordination problems in their limbs or have to swim with their arms but don't use their trunk or legs.
- S4/SB3: swimmers who have a function in their hands and arms but can't use their trunk or legs to swim or they have three amputated limbs.
- S5/SB4: swimmers who have hemiplegia, paraplegia or short stature.
- S6/SB5: swimmers who have short stature or arm amputations or some form of coordination problem on one side of their body.
- S7/SB6: swimmers who have one leg and one arm amputation on the opposite side or paralysis on one side of their body. These swimmers have full control of their arms and trunk but variable function in their legs.
- S8/SB7: swimmers who have a single amputation or restrictive movement in their hip, knee and ankle joints.
- S9/SB8: swimmers who have joint restrictions in one leg or double below-the-knee amputations.
- S10/SB9: swimmers who have minor physical impairments, for example, loss of one hand.
- S11/SB11: swimmers who have severe visual impairments and have very low or no light perception, such as blindness, they are required to wear blackened goggles to compete. They use tappers when competing in swimming events.
- S12/SB12: swimmers who have a moderate visual impairment and have a visual field of fewer than 5 degrees radius. They are required to wear blackened goggles to compete. They may wish to use a tapper.
- S13/SB13: swimmers who have a minor visual impairment and have high visual acuity. They are required to wear blackened goggles to compete. They may wish to use a tapper.
- S14/SB14: swimmers who have intellectual impairment.

== Schedule ==
The event is scheduled with morning and evening sessions from 10 to 15 June 2024. Morning sessions are for heats while evening ones are for finals and coincided with qualifications for the Olympic team.

Legend
Key	H	½	F	TF
Value	Heats	Semifinals	Final	Timed final

M = Morning session, E = Evening session

=== Olympic qualifications schedule ===
Men
Date →	10 Jun		11 Jun		12 Jun		13 Jun		14 Jun		15 Jun	
Event ↓	M	E	M	E	M	E	M	E	M	E	M	E
50 m freestyle					H	F						
100 m freestyle							H	F				
200 m freestyle			H	F								
400 m freestyle	H	F										
800 m freestyle					TF	TF						
1500 m freestyle									TF	TF		
100 m backstroke			H	F								
200 m backstroke									H	F		
100 m breaststroke	H	F										
200 m breaststroke									H	F		
100 m butterfly											H	F
200 m butterfly					H	F						
200 m individual medley							H	F				
400 m individual medley											H	F

Women
Date →	10 Jun		11 Jun		12 Jun		13 Jun		14 Jun		15 Jun	
Event ↓	M	E	M	E	M	E	M	E	M	E	M	E
50 m freestyle											H	F
100 m freestyle									H	F		
200 m freestyle					H	F						
400 m freestyle	H	F										
800 m freestyle							TF	TF				
1500 m freestyle											TF	TF
100 m backstroke			H	F								
200 m backstroke							H	F				
100 m breaststroke			H	F								
200 m breaststroke									H	F		
100 m butterfly	H	F										
200 m butterfly							H	F				
200 m individual medley	H	F										
400 m individual medley											H	F

=== Paralympic qualifications schedule ===
Men
Date →	10 Jun		11 Jun		12 Jun		13 Jun		14 Jun		15 Jun	
Event ↓	M	E	M	E	M	E	M	E	M	E	M	E
50 m freestyle Multi-Class			H	F								
100 m freestyle Multi-Class							H	F				
200 m freestyle Multi-Class	H	F										
400 m freestyle Multi-Class	H	F										
50 m backstroke Multi-Class					H	F						
100 m backstroke Multi-Class									H	F		
50 m breaststroke Multi-Class			H	F								
100 m breaststroke Multi-Class							H	F				
50 m butterfly Multi-Class									H	F		
100 m butterfly Multi-Class			H	F								
150 m individual medley Multi-Class					H	F						
200 m individual medley Multi-Class					H	F						

Women
Date →	10 Jun		11 Jun		12 Jun		13 Jun		14 Jun		15 Jun	
Event ↓	M	E	M	E	M	E	M	E	M	E	M	E
50 m freestyle Multi-Class			H	F								
100 m freestyle Multi-Class							H	F				
200 m freestyle Multi-Class	H	F										
400 m freestyle Multi-Class	H	F										
50 m backstroke Multi-Class					H	F						
100 m backstroke Multi-Class									H	F		
50 m breaststroke Multi-Class			H	F								
100 m breaststroke Multi-Class							H	F				
50 m butterfly Multi-Class									H	F		
100 m butterfly Multi-Class			H	F								
150 m individual medley Multi-Class					H	F						
200 m individual medley Multi-Class					H	F						

== Results ==
=== Men's ===
Event	First		Second		Third	
50 m freestyle	Cameron McEvoy; Somerville House (Qld)	21.35 Q	Ben Armbruster; Bond (Qld)	21.84 Q	Isaac Cooper; St Andrew's (Qld)	21.97
100 m freestyle	Kyle Chalmers; St Andrew's (Qld)	47.75 Q	William Yang; SOPAC (NSW)	48.08	Flynn Southam; Bond (Qld)	48.11
200 m freestyle	Maximillian Giuliani; Miami (Qld)	1:45.83 Q	Thomas Neill; Rackley (Qld)	1:46.02	Elijah Winnington; St Peters Western (Qld)	1:46.08
400 m freestyle	Elijah Winnington; St Peters Western (Qld)	3:43.26 Q	Samuel Short; Rackley (Qld)	3:43.90 Q	Ben Goedemans; St Peters Western (Qld)	3:48.66
800 m freestyle	Elijah Winnington; St Peters Western (Qld)	7:44.90 Q	Samuel Short; Rackley (Qld)	7:46.52	Matthew Galea; SOPAC (NSW)	7:53.99
1500 m freestyle	Matthew Galea; SOPAC (NSW)	14:58.96	Kyle Lee; North Coast (WA)	15:08.72	Ben Goedemans; St Peters Western (Qld)	15:09.38
100 m backstroke	Isaac Cooper; St Andrew's (QLD)	53.46	Bradley Woodward; Mingara (NSW)	53.53	Enoch Robb; All Saints (Qld)	54.14
200 m backstroke	Bradley Woodward; Mingara (NSW)	1:56.22 Q	Se-Bom Lee; SOPAC (NSW)	1:57.02 Q	Joshua Edwards-Smith; Griffith University (Qld)	1:57.10
100 m breaststroke	Samuel Williamson; Melbourne Vicentre (Vic)	58.80 ACR Q	Joshua Yong; UWA West Coast (WA)	59.48 Q	Zac Stubblety-Cook; Chandler (Qld)	59.63
200 m breaststroke	Zac Stubblety-Cook; Chandler (Qld)	2:07.40 Q	Joshua Yong; UWA West Coast (WA)	2:08.08 Q	Bailey Lello; Chandler (Qld)	2:10.65
100 m butterfly	Matthew Temple; Marion (SA)	51.15 Q	Ben Armbruster; Bond (Qld)	51.23	Shaun Champion; Abbotsleigh (NSW)	51.40
200 m butterfly	Bowen Gough; Griffith University (Qld)	1:56.18	Harrison Turner; Nudgee College (Qld)	1:57.07	Ruan van der Riet; USC Spartans (Qld)	1:59.21
200 m IM	William Petric; Nunawading (Vic)	1:57.54	Brendon Smith; Griffith University (Qld)	1:58.12	Se-Bom Lee; SOPAC (NSW)	2:00.11
400 m IM	Brendon Smith; Griffith University (Qld)	4:10.18 Q	William Petric; Nunawading (Vic)	4:11.78 Q	David Schlicht; MLC Aquatic (NSW)	4:20.78

=== Women's ===
Event	First		Second		Third	
50 m freestyle	Shayna Jack; St Peters Western (Qld)	23.99 Q	Meg Harris; Rackley (Qld)	24.26 Q	Emma McKeon; Griffith University (Qld)	24.32
100 m freestyle	Mollie O'Callaghan; St Peters Western (Qld)	52.33 Q	Shayna Jack; St Peters Western (Qld)	52.72 Q	Meg Harris; Rackley (Qld)	52.97
200 m freestyle	Ariarne Titmus; St Peters Western (Qld)	1:52.23 WR Q	Mollie O'Callaghan; St Peters Western (Qld)	1:52.48 Q	Lani Pallister; Griffith University (Qld)	1:55.57
400 m freestyle	Ariarne Titmus; St Peters Western (Qld)	3:55.44 ACR Q	Lani Pallister; Griffith University (Qld)	4:02.27 Q	Jamie Perkins; St Peters Western (Qld)	4:04.38
800 m freestyle	Ariarne Titmus; St Peters Western (Qld)	8:14.06 Q	Lani Pallister; Griffith University (Qld)	8:18.46 Q	Jamie Perkins; St Peters Western (Qld)	8:30.18
1500 m freestyle	Lani Pallister; Griffith University (Qld)	15:53.79 Q	Moesha Johnson; Griffith University (Qld)	15:57.85 Q	Tiana Kritzinger; Rackley (Qld)	16:20.58
100 m backstroke	Kaylee McKeown; Griffith University (Qld)	57.41 ACR Q	Mollie O'Callaghan; St Peters Western (Qld)	57.88 Q	Iona Anderson; Breakers WA (WA)	58.43
200 m backstroke	Kaylee McKeown; Griffith University (Qld)	2:03.30 Q	Jaclyn Barclay; St Peters Western (Qld)	2:07.88 Q	Hannah Fredericks; St Peters Western (Qld)	2:08.25
100 m breaststroke	Jenna Strauch; Miami (Qld)	1:06.90	Ella Ramsay; Chandler (Qld)	1:06.94	Sienna Toohey; Albury Amateur (NSW)	1:07.01
200 m breaststroke	Ella Ramsay; Chandler (Qld)	2:22.87 Q	Jenna Strauch; Miami (Qld)	2:24.04	Matilda Smith; Miami (Qld)	2:25.84
100 m butterfly	Emma McKeon; Griffith University (Qld)	56.85 Q	Alexandria Perkins; USC Spartans (Qld)	57.33	Brianna Throssell; St Peters Western (Qld)	57.42
200 m butterfly	Elizabeth Dekkers; Chandler (Qld)	2:06.01 Q	Abbey Connor; USC Spartans (Qld)	2:06.82 Q	Bella Grant; Trinity Grammar (NSW)	2:08.66
200 m IM	Kaylee McKeown; Griffith University (Qld)	2:06.63 CR Q	Ella Ramsay; Chandler (Qld)	2:09.32 Q	Jenna Forrester; St Peters Western (Qld)	2:11.83
400 m IM	Ella Ramsay; Chandler (Qld)	4:36.56 Q	Jenna Forrester; St Peters Western (Qld)	4:38.16 Q	Kiah Melverton; St Peters Western (Qld)	4:42.82

=== Men's ===
Event	First	Second	Third
50 m freestyle			
100 m freestyle			
200 m freestyle			
400 m freestyle			
50 m backstroke			
100 m backstroke			
50 m breaststroke			
50 m butterfly			
100 m butterfly			
150 m individual medley			
200 m individual medley			

=== Women's ===
Event	First	Second	Third
50 m freestyle			
100 m freestyle			
200 m freestyle			
400 m freestyle			
50 m backstroke			
100 m backstroke			
50 m breaststroke			
100 m breaststroke			
50 m butterfly			
100 m butterfly			
150 m individual medley			
200 m individual medley			

- Information retrieved from Swimming Australia.

Legend: WR – World record; CR – Commonwealth record; OC – Oceanian record; NR – Australian National record; ACR – Australian All Comers record; Club – Australian Club record; MR – Meet record Q – Olympic Qualification

== Records ==
During the 2024 Australian Swimming Trials the following records were set.

=== World records ===
Event	Name (Previous)	Time (Previous)	Year	Location	Name (New)	Time (New)	Difference
Women's 200 m freestyle	(Australia) Mollie O'Callaghan	1:52.85	2023	Fukuoka, Japan	(Australia) Ariarne Titmus	1:52.23	-0.62

=== Commonwealth records ===
Event	Name (Previous)	Time (Previous)	Year	Location	Name (New)	Time (New)	Difference
Women's 200 m IM	(United Kingdom) Siobhan-Marie O'Connor	2:06.88	2016	Rio de Janeiro, Brazil	(Australia) Kaylee McKeown	2:06.63	-0.25
Women's 200 m freestyle	(Australia) Mollie O'Callaghan	1:52.85	2023	Fukuoka, Japan	(Australia) Ariarne Titmus	1:52.23	-0.62

=== Australian records ===
Event	Name (Previous)	Time (Previous)	Year	Location	Name (New)	Time (New)	Difference
Women's 200 m IM	(Australia) Kaylee McKeown	2:06.99	2024	(Australia) Gold Coast, Queensland	(Australia) Kaylee McKeown	2:06.63	-0.36
Women's 200 m freestyle	(Australia) Mollie O'Callaghan	1:52.85	2023	Fukuoka, Japan	(Australia) Ariarne Titmus	1:52.23	-0.62

=== All Comers records ===
Event	Name (Previous)	Time (Previous)	Year	Location	Name (New)	Time (New)	Difference
Women's 400 m freestyle	(Australia) Ariarne Titmus	3:56.40	2022	Adelaide, South Australia	(Australia) Ariarne Titmus	3:55.44	-0.96
Women's 200 m IM	(Australia) Kaylee McKeown	2:06.99	2024	(Australia) Gold Coast, Queensland	(Australia) Kaylee McKeown	2:06.63	-0.36
Women's 100 m backstroke	(Australia) Kaylee McKeown	57.45	2021	Adelaide, South Australia	(Australia) Kaylee McKeown	57.41	-0.04
Women's 200 m freestyle	(Australia) Ariarne Titmus	1:53.09	2021	Adelaide, South Australia	(Australia) Ariarne Titmus	1:52.23	-0.86

== Olympic and Paralympic Team ==
For the Olympic team, up to 52 athletes will be selected and finalised on 15 June 2024. The following table includes athletes who were placed in the top 2 in the finals within the OQT, considered for relay events or selected as part of additional FINA selection. The Paralympic team is selected differently from the Olympic team and is based on a points system rather than just time.

=== Olympic team ===
Men	Women
Ben Armbruster; Jack Cartwright; Kyle Chalmers; Isaac Cooper; Maximillian Giuliani; Zac Incerti; Kyle Lee; Se-Bom Lee; Cameron McEvoy; Thomas Neill; William Petric; Samuel Short; Nick Sloman; Brendon Smith; Flynn Southam; Zac Stubblety-Cook; Kai Taylor; Matthew Temple; Samuel Williamson; Elijah Winnington; Bradley Woodward; William Yang; Joshua Yong	Iona Anderson; Jaclyn Barclay; Bronte Campbell; Abbey Connor; Elizabeth Dekkers; Jenna Forrester; Chelsea Gubecka; Meg Harris; Shayna Jack; Moesha Johnson; Emma McKeon; Kaylee McKeown; Mollie O'Callaghan; Lani Pallister; Alexandria Perkins; Jamie Perkins; Ella Ramsay; Jenna Strauch; Brianna Throssell; Ariarne Titmus; Olivia Wunsch

=== Paralympic team ===
Men	Women
Jesse Aungles; Ricky Betar; Lewis Bishop; Rowan Crothers; Tom Gallagher; Brenden Hall; Benjamin Hance; Timothy Hodge; Jack Ireland; Ahmed Kelly; Jake Michel; Grant Patterson; Col Pearse; Alex Saffy; Callum Simpson	Emily Beecroft; Katja Dedekind; Jasmine Greenwood; Ella Jones; Jenna Jones; Alexa Leary; Paige Leonhardt; Madeleine McTernan; Chloe Osborn; Lakeisha Patterson; Keira Stephens; Ruby Storm; Holly Warn; Rachael Watson; Poppy Wilson

== See also ==
- Swimming at the 2024 Summer Olympics
- Australia at the 2024 Summer Olympics
- Australia at the 2024 Summer Paralympics
- 2024 Summer Olympics
- 2024 Summer Paralympics
