= 2022 Australian Swimming Championships =

- Host city: Adelaide, South Australia
- Date: 18–22 May
- Venue: South Australia Aquatic and Leisure Centre
- Events: 41 (men: 20; women: 20, mixed: 1)

The 2022 Australian Swimming Championships were held from 18 to 22 May 2022 at the South Australia Aquatic and Leisure Centre in Adelaide, South Australia.

Originally scheduled for April, the meet was postponed to May after the announcement of the 2022 FINA World Championships in Budapest, Hungary scheduled for June 2022. This event doubled up as the national trials for the FINA World Championships, as well as the Birmingham 2022 Commonwealth Games.

Swimming Australia introduced a selection clause allowing individual medalists from the 2020 Olympics to automatically qualify for the 2022 Commonwealth Games. Consequently, Emma McKeon opted out of the championships entirely, and Kyle Chalmers only contested the butterfly events.

Two world records were broken during the competition: Zac Stubblety-Cook in the men's 200 m breaststroke and Ariarne Titmus in the women's 400 m freestyle.

== Schedule ==
Legend
| Key | H | ½ | F | TF |
| Value | Heats | Semifinals | Final | Timed final |

M = Morning session, E = Evening session

Men
| Date → | 18 May | | 19 May | | 20 May | | 21 May | | 22 May | |
| Event ↓ | M | E | M | E | M | E | M | E | M | E |
|---|---|---|---|---|---|---|---|---|---|---|
| 50 m freestyle | H | F | | | | | | | | |
| 100 m freestyle | | | | | | | H | F | | |
| 200 m freestyle | | | H | F | | | | | | |
| 400 m freestyle | H | F | | | | | | | | |
| 800 m freestyle | | | | | TF | TF | | | | |
| 1500 m freestyle | | | | | | | | | TF | TF |
| 50 m backstroke | | | | | H | F | | | | |
| 100 m backstroke | | | | | | | | | H | F |
| 200 m backstroke | H | F | | | | | | | | |
| 50 m breaststroke | | | | | | | | | H | F |
| 100 m breaststroke | | | | | H | F | | | | |
| 200 m breaststroke | | | H | F | | | | | | |
| 50 m butterfly | | | H | F | | | | | | |
| 100 m butterfly | H | F | | | | | | | | |
| 200 m butterfly | | | | | | | H | F | | |
| 200 m individual medley | | | | | H | F | | | | |
| 400 m individual medley | | | | | | | H | F | | |
| 4 × 100 m freestyle relay | | | | TF | | | | | | |
| 4 × 200 m freestyle relay | | TF | | | | | | | | |
| 4 × 100 m medley relay | | | | | | | | TF | | |

Mixed
| Date → | 18 May | | 19 May | | 20 May | | 21 May | | 22 May | |
| Event ↓ | M | E | M | E | M | E | M | E | M | E |
|---|---|---|---|---|---|---|---|---|---|---|
| 4 × 100 m medley relay | | | | | | | | | | TF |

Women
| Date → | 18 May | | 19 May | | 20 May | | 21 May | | 22 May | |
| Event ↓ | M | E | M | E | M | E | M | E | M | E |
|---|---|---|---|---|---|---|---|---|---|---|
| 50 m freestyle | | | | | | | | | H | F |
| 100 m freestyle | H | F | | | | | | | | |
| 200 m freestyle | | | | | H | F | | | | |
| 400 m freestyle | | | | | | | | | H | F |
| 800 m freestyle | TF | TF | | | | | | | | |
| 1500 m freestyle | | | | | | | TF | TF | | |
| 50 m backstroke | | | H | F | | | | | | |
| 100 m backstroke | | | | | H | F | | | | |
| 200 m backstroke | | | | | | | H | F | | |
| 50 m breaststroke | | | H | F | | | | | | |
| 100 m breaststroke | H | F | | | | | | | | |
| 200 m breaststroke | | | | | H | F | | | | |
| 50 m butterfly | | | | | | | H | F | | |
| 100 m butterfly | | | H | F | | | | | | |
| 200 m butterfly | | | | | | | | | H | F |
| 200 m individual medley | | | | | | | | | H | F |
| 400 m individual medley | | | H | F | | | | | | |
| 4 × 100 m freestyle relay | | | | TF | | | | | | |
| 4 × 200 m freestyle relay | | | | | | TF | | | | |
| 4 × 100 m medley relay | | | | | | | | TF | | |

== Medal winners ==
The medallist for the open events are below.

=== Men's events ===
| Event | Gold | | Silver | | Bronze | |
|---|---|---|---|---|---|---|
| 50 m freestyle | Thomas Nowakowski; Somerset (Qld) | 21.86 | Grayson Bell; Somerset (Qld) | 22.08 | Isaac Cooper; Rackley (Qld) | 22.33 |
| 100 m freestyle | William Yang; Loreto Normanhurst (NSW) | 48.55 | Zac Incerti; Marion (SA) | 48.65 | Flynn Southam; Bond (Qld) | 48.76 |
| 200 m freestyle | Zac Incerti; Marion (SA) | 1:45.80 | Elijah Winnington; St Peters Western (Qld) | 1:46.01 | Mack Horton; Griffith University (Qld) | 1:46.70 |
| 400 m freestyle | Elijah Winnington; St Peters Western (Qld) | 3:43.10 | Mack Horton; Griffith University (Qld) | 3:44.06 | Samuel Short; Rackley (Qld) | 3:44.34 |
| 800 m freestyle | Elijah Winnington; St Peters Western (Qld) | 7:45.30 | Samuel Short; Rackley (Qld) | 7:48.65 | Joshua Staples; St Peters Western (Qld) | 7:58.26 |
| 1500 m freestyle | Samuel Short; Rackley (Qld) | 15:05.55 | Alec Mander; Perth City (WA) | 15:15.02 | Kieren Pollard; North Coast (WA) | 15:16.39 |
| 50 m backstroke | Isaac Cooper; Rackley (Qld) | 24.44 OC, ACR | Ben Armbruster; Bond (Qld) | 25.13 | Bradley Woodward; Mingara (NSW) | 25.35 |
| 100 m backstroke | Isaac Cooper; Rackley (Qld) | 54.02 | Mitch Larkin; Chandler (Qld) | 54.30 | Joshua Edwards-Smith; Griffith University (Qld) | 54.33 |
| 200 m backstroke | Joshua Edwards-Smith; Griffith University (Qld) | 1:56.71 | Mitch Larkin; Chandler (Qld) | 1:56.79 | Bradley Woodward; Mingara (NSW) | 1:57.38 |
| 50 m breaststroke | Samuel Williamson; Melbourne VicCentre (Vic) | 27.05 | Jake Packard; USC Spartans (Qld) | 27.67 | Nash Wilkes; Southport (QLD) | 27.75 |
| 100 m breaststroke | Zac Stubblety-Cook; Chandler (Qld) | 59.60 | Joshua Yong; USC Spartans (Qld) | 1:00.04 | Samuel Williamson; Melbourne VicCentre (Vic) | 1:00.52 |
| 200 m breaststroke | Zac Stubblety-Cook; Chandler (Qld) | 2:05.95 WR | Matthew Wilson; SOPAC (NSW) | 2:10.14 | Adam Selwood; Western Melbourne (Vic) | 2:13.68 |
| 50 m butterfly | Kyle Chalmers; Marion (SA) | 23.21 | William Yang; Loreto Normanhurst (NSW) | 23.50 | Isaac Cooper; Rackley (Qld) | 23.53 |
| 100 m butterfly | Matthew Temple; Melbourne (Vic) | 51.50 | Kyle Chalmers; Marion (SA) | 51.67 | Cody Simpson; Griffith University (Qld) | 51.96 |
| 200 m butterfly | Bowen Gough; Griffith University (Qld) | 1:56.74 | Charlie Hawke; Hunter (NSW) | 1:58.00 | David Morgan; Miami (Qld) | 1:58.39 |
| 200 m IM | Brendon Smith; Griffith University (Qld) | 1:58.59 | Se-Bom Lee; Carlile (NSW) | 1:59.48 | Joshua Collett; Bond (Qld) | 2:00.59 |
| 400 m IM | Brendon Smith; Griffith University (Qld) | 4:11.88 | Se-Bom Lee; Carlile (NSW) | 4:14.77 | Kieren Pollard; North Coast (WA) | 4:14.78 |
| 4 × 100 m freestyle relay | SOPAC A (NSW) | 3:24.05 | Sydney University A (NSW) | 3:24.44 | Southside Penrhos A (WA) | 3:30.13 |
| 4 × 200 m freestyle relay | Sydney University A (NSW) | 7:33.04 | City of Sydney A (NSW) | 7:47.11 | None awarded | |
| 4 × 100 m medley relay | Carlile A (NSW) | 3:41.84 | MLC Aquatic A (Vic) | 3:46.48 | Sydney University A (NSW) | 3:46.79 |

=== Women's events ===
| Event | Gold | | Silver | | Bronze | |
|---|---|---|---|---|---|---|
| 50 m freestyle | Shayna Jack; St Peters Western (Qld) | 24.14 | Meg Harris; Marion (SA) | 24.50 | Mollie O'Callaghan; St Peters Western (Qld) | 24.52 |
| 100 m freestyle | Mollie O'Callaghan; St Peters Western (Qld) | 52.49 | Shayna Jack; St Peters Western (Qld) | 52.60 | Meg Harris; Marion (SA) | 53.09 |
| 200 m freestyle | Ariarne Titmus; St Peters Western (Qld) | 1:53.31 | Mollie O'Callaghan; St Peters Western (Qld) | 1:54.94 | Madison Wilson; Marion (SA) | 1:55.86 |
| 400 m freestyle | Ariarne Titmus; St Peters Western (Qld) | 3:56.40 WR | Lani Pallister; Griffith University (Qld) | 4:02.21 | Kiah Melverton; St Peters Western (Qld) | 4:04.49 |
| 800 m freestyle | Lani Pallister; Griffith University (Qld) | 8:17.77 | Kiah Melverton; St Peters Western (Qld) | 8:22.64 | Moesha Johnson; Griffith University (Qld) | 8:26.35 |
| 1500 m freestyle | Lani Pallister; Griffith University (Qld) | 15:55.40 | Moesha Johnson; Griffith University (Qld) | 16:00.74 | Maddy Gough; Chandler (Qld) | 16:08.31 |
| 50 m backstroke | Mollie O'Callaghan; St Peters Western (Qld) | 27.46 | Bronte Job; Rackley (Qld) | 27.63 | Minna Atherton; Bond (QLD) | 28.31 |
| 100 m backstroke | Kaylee McKeown; Griffith University (Qld) | 58.49 | Mollie O'Callaghan; St Peters Western (Qld) | 59.12 | Minna Atherton; Bond (QLD) | 1:00.62 |
| 200 m backstroke | Kaylee McKeown; Griffith University (Qld) | 2:05.31 | Mollie O'Callaghan; St Peters Western (Qld) | 2:08.48 | Minna Atherton; Bond (QLD) | 2:10.20 |
| 50 m breaststroke | Chelsea Hodges; Southport (Qld) | 30.15 OC, ACR | Jenna Strauch; Miami (Qld) | 30.82 | Mia O'Leary; Bond (Qld) | 31.31 |
| 100 m breaststroke | Jenna Strauch; Miami (Qld) | 1:06.69 | Abbey Harkin; St Peters Western (Qld) | 1:06.88 | Chelsea Hodges; Southport (Qld) | 1:06.94 |
| 200 m breaststroke | Jenna Strauch; Miami (Qld) | 2:23.26 | Abbey Harkin; St Peters Western (Qld) | 2:24.85 | Taylor McKeown; Griffith University (Qld) | 2:25.32 |
| 50 m butterfly | Holly Barratt; Rockingham (WA) | 26.02 | Alexandria Perkins; USC Spartans (Qld) | 26.18 | Abigail Schoorl; Miami (Qld) | 26.45 |
| 100 m butterfly | Brianna Throssell; USC Spartans (Qld) | 57.31 | Alexandria Perkins; USC Spartans (Qld) | 58.39 | Brittany Castelluzzo; Tea Tree Gully (SA); Gemma Cooney; Brisbane Grammar (Qld) | 58.93 |
| 200 m butterfly | Elizabeth Dekkers; Newmarket Racers (Qld) | 2:07.62 | Abbey Connor; Revesby Workers (NSW) | 2:08.58 | Brianna Throssell; USC Spartans (Qld) | 2:08.71 |
| 200 m IM | Kaylee McKeown; Griffith University (Qld) | 2:09.15 | Ella Ramsay; St Peters Western (Qld) | 2:12.12 | Abbey Harkin; St Peters Western (Qld) | 2:12.74 |
| 400 m IM | Kaylee McKeown; Griffith University (Qld) | 4:31.74 | Jenna Forrester; St Peters Western (Qld) | 4:36.77 | Kiah Melverton; St Peters Western (Qld) | 4:39.78 |
| 4 × 100 m freestyle relay | Manly A (NSW) | 3:52.48 | Marion A (SA) | 3:54.82 | Nunawading A (Vic) | 3:54.87 |
| 4 × 200 m freestyle relay | Nunawading A (Vic) | 8:33.34 | Marion A (SA) | 8:49.22 | None awarded | |
| 4 × 100 m medley relay | Nunawading A (Vic) | 4:09.67 | Manly A (NSW) | 4:18.81 | Surrey Park A (Vic) | 4:19.58 |

=== Mixed events ===
| Event | Gold | | Silver | | Bronze | |
|---|---|---|---|---|---|---|
| 4 × 100 m medley relay | Southport A (Qld) | 3:56.51 | Nunawading A (Vic) | 3:56.81 | Knox Pymble A (NSW) | 3:58.89 |

Legend: WR – World record; CR – Commonwealth record; OC – Oceanian record; AR – Australian record; ACR – Australian All Comers record; Club – Australian Club record;

== Club points scores ==
The final club point scores are below. Note: Only the top ten clubs are listed.

Overall club point score
| Rank | Club | State | Points |
|---|---|---|---|
| 1 | St Peters Western | Qld | 1355.5 |
| 2 | Griffith University | Qld | 990 |
| 3 | Rackley | Qld | 719 |
| 4 | Bond | Qld | 625 |
| 5 | Nunawading | Vic | 540 |
| 6 | USC Spartans | Qld | 535.5 |
| 7 | Marion | SA | 524 |
| 8 | Chandler | Qld | 500 |
| 9 | Nudgee College | Qld | 384 |
| 10 | Southport | Qld | 344 |

== Broadcast ==
In February 2021, it was announced that Amazon Prime Video had secured an exclusive, two-year live broadcast streaming deal with Swimming Australia. Like in 2021, both the heat sessions and final sessions were streamed live on Prime Video and on Swimming Australia's digital platform SwimTV. The commentary team consisted of Grant Hackett, Giaan Rooney, Nicole Livingstone and Annabelle Williams. Journalist Matt White hosted the coverage, while Jon Harker called the action.
