= Swimming at the 2023 Pan American Games – Women's 200 metre freestyle =

Women's 200 metre freestyle at the 2023 Pan American Games
- Venue: Aquatic Center
- Date: October 22, 2023
- Competitors: 26 from 22 nations

Medalists
| Gold medal | Mary-Sophie Harvey | Canada |
| Silver medal | Maria Fernanda Costa | Brazil |
| Bronze medal | Camille Spink | United States |

The women's 400 metre freestyle competition of the swimming events at the 2023 Pan American Games were held on October 22, 2023, at the Aquatic Center in Santiago, Chile.

== Records ==
Prior to this competition, the existing world and Pan American Games records were as follows:

| World record | Mollie O'Callaghan (AUS) | 1:52.85 | Fukuoka, Japan | July 26, 2023 |
| Pan American Games record | Allison Schmitt (USA) | 1:56.23 | Toronto, Canada | July 15, 2015 |

== Results ==
| KEY: | QA | Qualified for A final | QB | Qualified for B final | GR | Games record | NR | National record | PB | Personal best | SB | Seasonal best | WD | Withdrew |

=== Heats ===
The first round was held on October 22.

| Rank | Heat | Lane | Name | Nationality | Time | Notes |
|---|---|---|---|---|---|---|
| 1 | 3 | 4 | Mary-Sophie Harvey | Canada | 1:59.31 | QA |
| 2 | 3 | 5 | Camille Spink | United States | 1:59.94 | QA |
| 3 | 4 | 5 | Maria Fernanda Costa | Brazil | 2:01.23 | QA |
| 4 | 4 | 4 | Stephanie Balduccini | Brazil | 2:01.25 | QA |
| 5 | 2 | 4 | Kayla Wilson | United States | 2:01.34 | QA |
| 6 | 2 | 5 | Emma O'Croinin | Canada | 2:01.65 | QA |
| 7 | 4 | 3 | Elisbet Gámez | Cuba | 2:01.90 | QA |
| 8 | 4 | 6 | Andrea Becali | Cuba | 2:02.24 | QA |
| 9 | 2 | 6 | Inés Marín | Chile | 2:03.03 | QB |
| 10 | 3 | 6 | María Yegres | Venezuela | 2:03.17 | QB |
| 11 | 2 | 2 | Ana Carolina Vieira | Brazil | 2:03.18 | WD |
| 12 | 2 | 3 | María José Mata Cocco | Mexico | 2:03.51 | QB |
| 13 | 4 | 2 | Lucía Gauna | Argentina | 2:04.02 | QB |
| 14 | 3 | 3 | Karen Durango | Colombia | 2:04.04 | WD |
| 15 | 3 | 7 | Beatriz Padrón | Costa Rica | 2:04.91 | QB |
| 16 | 4 | 7 | Susana Hernández | Mexico | 2:05.47 | QB |
| 17 | 4 | 1 | Lucero Mejía | Independent Athletes Team | 2:06.89 | |
| 18 | 2 | 7 | Julimar Ávila | Honduras | 2:07.59 | |
| 19 | 2 | 1 | Elisabeth Timmer | Aruba | 2:08.59 | |
| 20 | 1 | 3 | Timmy Collymore | Grenada | 2:01.91 | |
| 21 | 3 | 8 | Ariana Valle | El Salvador | 2:11.67 | |
| 22 | 3 | 1 | Harper Barrowman | Cayman Islands | 2:11.95 | |
| 23 | 1 | 5 | Natalia Kuipers | Virgin Islands | 2:13.29 | |
| 24 | 1 | 4 | Stefania Piccardo | Paraguay | 2:14.31 | |
| — | 4 | 8 | Zaylie Thompson | Bahamas | DNS | |
| — | 3 | 2 | Anicka Delgado | Ecuador | DNS | |

=== Final B ===
The B final was also held on October 22.

| Rank | Lane | Name | Nationality | Time | Notes |
|---|---|---|---|---|---|
| 9 | 5 | María Yegres | Venezuela | 2:02.03 | |
| 10 | 3 | María José Mata Cocco | Mexico | 2:03.21 | |
| 11 | 4 | Inés Marín | Chile | 2:03.33 | |
| 12 | 6 | Lucía Gauna | Argentina | 2:05.24 | |
| 13 | 2 | Beatriz Padrón | Costa Rica | 2:05.71 | |
| 14 | 8 | Julimar Ávila | Honduras | 2:05.74 | |
| 15 | 1 | Lucero Mejía | Independent Athletes Team | 2:05.86 | |
| 16 | 7 | Susana Hernández | Mexico | 2:06.10 | |

=== Final A ===
The A final was also held on October 22.

| Rank | Lane | Name | Nationality | Time | Notes |
|---|---|---|---|---|---|
| 1st place, gold medalist(s) | 4 | Mary-Sophie Harvey | Canada | 1:58.08 | |
| 2nd place, silver medalist(s) | 3 | Maria Fernanda Costa | Brazil | 1:58.12 | |
| 3rd place, bronze medalist(s) | 5 | Camille Spink | United States | 1:58.61 | |
| 4 | 6 | Stephanie Balduccini | Brazil | 1:58.67 | |
| 5 | 2 | Kayla Wilson | United States | 1:58.91 | |
| 6 | 7 | Emma O'Croinin | Canada | 2:00.79 | |
| 7 | 8 | Andrea Becali | Cuba | 2:01.19 | |
| 8 | 1 | Elisbet Gámez | Cuba | 2:01.78 | |
