= Swimming at the 2024 Summer Olympics – Women's 400-metre freestyle =

Women's 400-metre freestyle at the Games of the XXXIII Olympiad
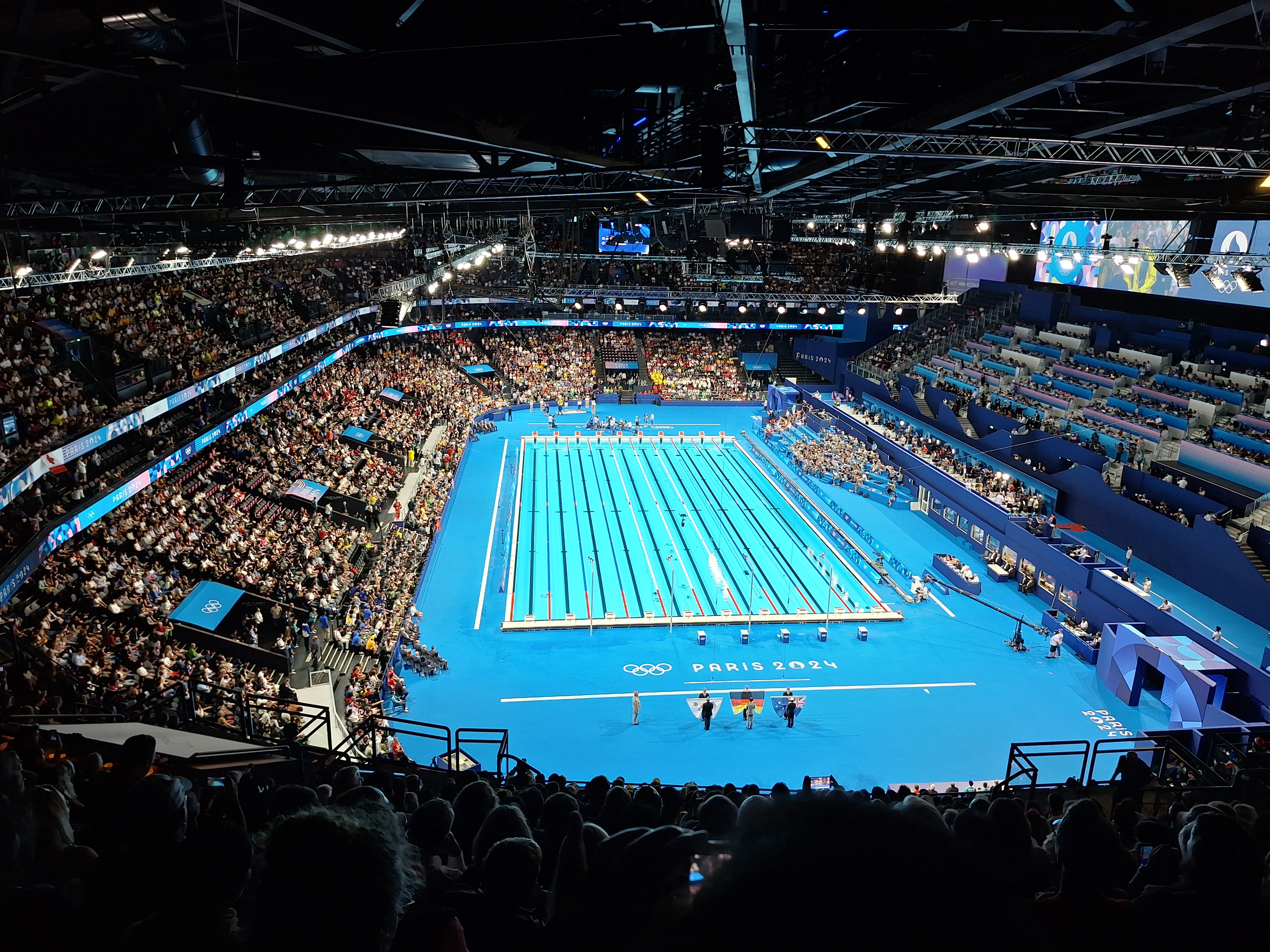
- Paris La Défense Arena after it was converted to a swimming pool for the swimming events
- Venue: Paris La Défense Arena
- Dates: 27 July 2024 (Heats and Final)
- Competitors: 21 from 15 nations
- Winning time: 3:57.49

Medalists
| 1st place, gold medalist(s) | | Ariarne Titmus | Australia |
| 2nd place, silver medalist(s) | | Summer McIntosh | Canada |
| 3rd place, bronze medalist(s) | | Katie Ledecky | United States |

The women's 400-metre freestyle event at the 2024 Summer Olympics was held on 27 July at Paris La Défense Arena, which was converted to a swimming pool for the swimming events.

Australia's defending Olympic champion Ariarne Titmus, Canada's Summer McIntosh and the US' Katie Ledecky were the favourites going into the event. In the final, Titmus led from beginning to end to claim Australia's first gold of the Games, while McIntosh won silver and Ledecky won bronze. Isabel Marie Gose set a new German national record of 4:02.14 to finish in fifth.

== Background ==
Ariarne Titmus of Australia was the defending champion in the event, while the US' Katie Ledecky was runner up at the previous Olympics. Ledecky also held the Olympic record of 3:56.46 from Rio 2016 and won the event at the 2022 World Championships. (Note: Titmus did not enter the 2022 World Championships.) Early in 2023, Canadian Summer McIntosh broke the world record in the event, and at the 2023 World Championships, Titmus finished first with another new world record of 3:55.38. SwimSwam and Swimming World both listed Titmus, McIntosh and Ledecky as the main contenders for the event, and both opined that Titmus was most likely to win. SwimSwam also stated that the race "was touted as one of the most high-profile races of the Olympics".

The event was held at Paris La Défense Arena, which was converted to a swimming pool for the swimming events.

== Qualification ==
Each National Olympic Committee (NOC) was permitted to enter a maximum of two qualified athletes in each individual event, but only if both of them had attained the Olympic Qualifying Time (OQT). For this event, the OQT was 4:07.90. World Aquatics then considered athletes qualifying through universality; NOCs were given one event entry for each gender, which could be used by any athlete regardless of qualification time, providing the spaces had not already been taken by athletes from that nation who had achieved the OQT. Finally, the rest of the spaces were filled by athletes who had met the Olympic Consideration Time (OCT), which was 4:09.14 for this event. In total, 19 athletes qualified through achieving the OQT, three athletes qualified through universality places and one athlete qualified through achieving the OCT.

Top 10 fastest qualification times
| Swimmer | Country | Time | Competition |
|---|---|---|---|
| Ariarne Titmus | Australia | 3:55.38 | 2023 World Aquatics Championships |
| Summer McIntosh | Canada | 3:56.08 | 2024 Canadian Olympic Trials |
| Katie Ledecky | United States | 3:58.35 | 2024 United States Olympic Trials |
| Erika Fairweather | New Zealand | 3:59.44 | 2024 World Aquatics Championships |
| Li Bingjie | China | 4:01.62 | 2024 World Aquatics Championships |
| Paige Madden | United States | 4:02.08 | 2024 United States Olympic Trials |
| Isabel Marie Gose | Germany | 4:02.39 | 2024 World Aquatics Championships |
| Maria Fernanda Costa | Brazil | 4:02.86 | 2024 World Aquatics Championships |
| Gabrielle Roncatto | Brazil | 4:04.18 | 2024 World Aquatics Championships |
| Jamie Perkins | Australia | 4:04.38 | 2024 Australian Olympic Trials |

== Heats ==
Three heats (preliminary rounds) took place on 27 July 2024, starting at 11:12. (Note: All times are Central European Summer Time (UTC+2)) The swimmers with the best eight times in the heats advanced to the final. Leonie Märtens won the first heat but did not qualify for the final, while New Zealand's Erika Fairweather won the second heat to qualify as third seed, and Katie Ledecky won the final heat to qualify as first seed.

Results
| Rank | Heat | Lane | Swimmer | Nation | Time | Notes |
|---|---|---|---|---|---|---|
| 1 | 3 | 5 | Katie Ledecky | United States | 4:02.19 | Q |
| 2 | 3 | 4 | Ariarne Titmus | Australia | 4:02.46 | Q |
| 3 | 2 | 5 | Erika Fairweather | New Zealand | 4:02.55 | Q |
| 4 | 2 | 4 | Summer McIntosh | Canada | 4:02.65 | Q |
| 5 | 2 | 2 | Jamie Perkins | Australia | 4:03.30 | Q |
| 6 | 2 | 3 | Paige Madden | United States | 4:03.34 | Q |
| 7 | 2 | 6 | Maria Fernanda Costa | Brazil | 4:03.47 | Q |
| 8 | 3 | 6 | Isabel Marie Gose | Germany | 4:03.83 | Q |
| 9 | 3 | 3 | Li Bingjie | China | 4:03.96 | |
| 10 | 3 | 7 | Liu Yaxin | China | 4:04.39 | |
| 11 | 3 | 1 | Waka Kobori | Japan | 4:08.02 | |
| 12 | 2 | 1 | Valentine Dumont | Belgium | 4:08.25 | |
| 13 | 3 | 8 | Ajna Késely | Hungary | 4:08.90 | |
| 14 | 1 | 4 | Leonie Märtens | Germany | 4:09.62 | |
| 15 | 2 | 8 | Anastasiya Kirpichnikova | France | 4:10.32 | |
| 16 | 3 | 2 | Gabrielle Roncatto | Brazil | 4:10.46 | |
| 17 | 2 | 7 | Eve Thomas | New Zealand | 4:11.86 | |
| 18 | 1 | 5 | Agostina Hein | Argentina | 4:14.24 | |
| 19 | 1 | 6 | Anastasiya Zelinskaya | Uzbekistan | 4:31.71 | |
| 20 | 1 | 2 | Natalia Kuipers | Virgin Islands | 4:33.46 | |
| 21 | 1 | 3 | Karin Belbeisi | Jordan | 4:37.30 | |

== Final ==
The final took place at 20:52 on 27 July. Ariarne Titmus led from the beginning to the end of the race. McIntosh was within 0.35 seconds of Titmus at halfway, but Titmus extended her lead to the finish to win with a time of 3:57.49. McIntosh finished second with 3:58.37 and Ledecky third with 4:00.86. Titmus' gold was Australia's first gold of the Games. Kieran Pender of The Guardian wrote that the race was "almost dull" with Titmus leading the way, while Steve Keating from Reuters said that it was not as exciting as anticipated. Isabel Marie Gose set a new national record for Germany with 4:02.14, 0.25 seconds faster than her previous record.

Results
| Rank | Lane | Swimmer | Nation | Time | Notes |
|---|---|---|---|---|---|
| 1st place, gold medalist(s) | 5 | Ariarne Titmus | Australia | 3:57.49 | |
| 2nd place, silver medalist(s) | 6 | Summer McIntosh | Canada | 3:58.37 | |
| 3rd place, bronze medalist(s) | 4 | Katie Ledecky | United States | 4:00.86 | |
| 4 | 3 | Erika Fairweather | New Zealand | 4:01.12 | |
| 5 | 8 | Isabel Marie Gose | Germany | 4:02.14 | NR |
| 6 | 7 | Paige Madden | United States | 4:02.26 | |
| 7 | 1 | Maria Fernanda Costa | Brazil | 4:03.53 | |
| 8 | 2 | Jamie Perkins | Australia | 4:04.96 | |

Statistics
| Name | 100 metre split | 200 metre split | 300 metre split | Time | Stroke rate (strokes/min) |
|---|---|---|---|---|---|
| Ariarne Titmus | 56.92 | 1:56.97 | 2:56.92 | 3:57.49 | 43.8 |
| Summer McIntosh | 57.03 | 1:57.32 | 2:57.48 | 3:58.37 | 44.1 |
| Katie Ledecky | 57.69 | 1:58.52 | 2:59.51 | 4:00.86 | 47.4 |
| Erika Fairweather | 57.65 | 1:58.98 | 3:01.16 | 4:01.12 | 42.8 |
| Isabel Marie Gose | 58.17 | 1:59.19 | 3:00.75 | 4:02.14 | 48.1 |
| Paige Madden | 57.77 | 1:59.19 | 3:31.42 | 4:02.26 | 42.5 |
| Maria Fernanda Costa | 58.25 | 2:00.27 | 3:02.90 | 4:03.53 | 42.4 |
| Jamie Perkins | 58.19 | 1:59.92 | 3:02.56 | 4:04.96 | 42.1 |
