= Swimming at the 2024 Summer Olympics – Women's 800-metre freestyle =

Women's 800-metre freestyle at the Games of the XXXIII Olympiad
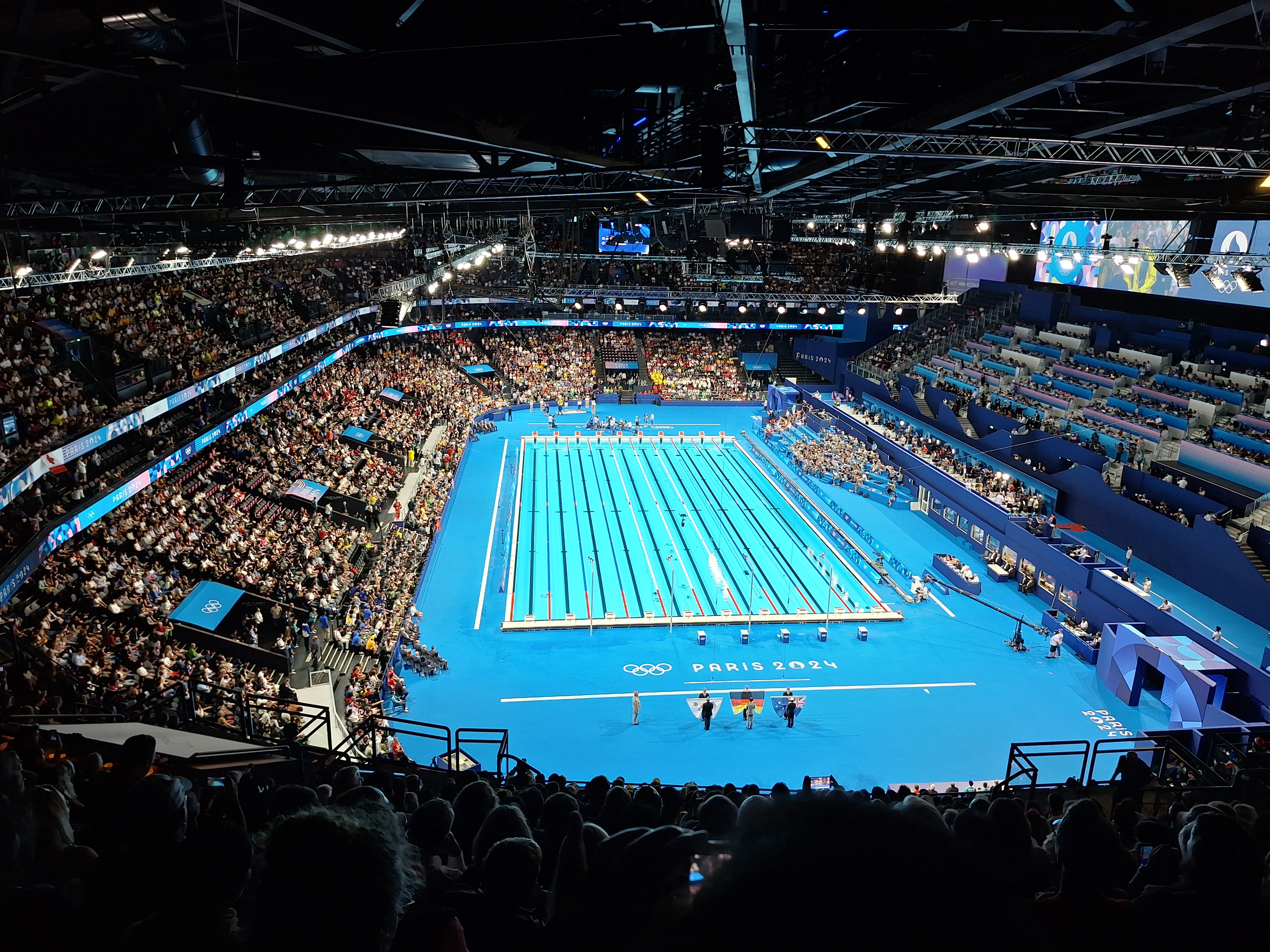
- Paris La Défense Arena after it was converted to a swimming pool for the swimming events
- Venue: Paris La Défense Arena
- Dates: 2 August 2024 (Heats); 3 August 2024 (Final)
- Competitors: 16 from 13 nations
- Winning time: 8:11.04

Medalists
1st place, gold medalist(s)		Katie Ledecky	United States
2nd place, silver medalist(s)		Ariarne Titmus	Australia
3rd place, bronze medalist(s)		Paige Madden	United States

The women's 800-metre freestyle event at the 2024 Summer Olympics was held from 2 to 3 August 2024 at Paris La Défense Arena, which was converted to a swimming pool for the swimming events.

The US' defending Olympic champion Katie Ledecky was considered the favourite for the event, having won it at the previous three Olympics. Other competitors included Australia's Ariarne Titmus, Italy's Simona Quadarella, the US' Paige Madden, Australia's Lani Pallister and China's Li Bingjie. All except Li qualified for the final.

In the final, Ledecky led from beginning to end to win with a time of 8:11.04. Titmus finished second with a new Oceanic record of 8:12.29, Madden finished third with 8:13.00 and Quadarella finished fourth with a new Italian record of 8:14.55. Ledecky's win made her the first female Olympic swimmer to win the same event at four successive Olympics, and gave her her ninth gold medal, which meant she became tied for the female Olympian with the most gold medals.

== Background ==
The US' defending Olympic champion Katie Ledecky had won the event at the previous three Olympics, and held the 16 fastest times ever recorded in the event, which included her 8:04.79 world record set at the 2016 Olympics. She also held the fastest Olympic qualifying time of 8:07.07.

Australia's Ariarne Titmus held the third fastest qualifying time of 08:13.59, and the second fastest time in 2024 of 8:14.06. Other contenders included Italy's Simona Quadarella, the defending Olympic bronze medallist; the US' Paige Madden, who beat her personal best by seven seconds at the US Olympic Trials to qualify with a time of 8:20.71; Australia's Lani Pallister, who qualified with the fourth fastest time of 8:15.11; and China's Li Bingjie, who qualified with the second fastest time of 8:13.31 and was the 2023 World Championships silver medallist.

Both SwimSwam and Swimming World predicted Ledecky would win gold and Titmus would win silver.

The event was held at Paris La Défense Arena, which was converted to a swimming pool for the swimming events.

== Qualification ==
Each National Olympic Committee (NOC) was permitted to enter a maximum of two qualified athletes in each individual event, but only if both of them had attained the Olympic Qualifying Time (OQT). For this event, the OQT was 8:26.71. World Aquatics then considered athletes qualifying through universality; NOCs were given one event entry for each gender, which could be used by any athlete regardless of qualification time, providing the spaces had not already been taken by athletes from that nation who had achieved the OQT. Finally, the rest of the spaces were filled by athletes who had met the Olympic Consideration Time (OCT), which was 8:29.24 for this event. In total, 11 athletes qualified through achieving the OQT, 12 athletes qualified through universality places and two athletes qualified through achieving the OCT.

Top 10 fastest qualification times
Swimmer	Country	Time	Competition
Katie Ledecky	United States	8:07.07	2023 United States National Championships
Li Bingjie	China	8:13.31	2023 World Aquatics Championships
Ariarne Titmus	Australia	8:13.59	2023 World Aquatics Championships
Lani Pallister	Australia	8:15.11	2023 World Aquatics World Cup
Simona Quadarella	Italy	8:16.46	2023 World Aquatics Championships
Isabel Marie Gose	Germany	8:17.53	2024 World Aquatics Championships
Paige Madden	United States	8:20.71	2024 United States Olympic Trials
Erika Fairweather	New Zealand	8:21.06	2023 World Aquatics Championships
Eve Thomas	New Zealand	8:22.27	2024 New Zealand Championships
Anastasiya Kirpichnikova	France	8:22.74	2023 World Aquatics Championships

== Heats ==
Two heats (preliminary rounds) took place on 2 August 2024, starting at 11:40. (Note: All times are Central European Summer Time (UTC+2)) The swimmers with the best eight times in the heats advanced to the final. Ledecky qualified with the fastest time of 8:16.62, while Madden qualified second with a new personal best of 8:18.48. SwimSwam reported after the race that she was improving rapidly. Titmus, Pallister, Germany's Isabel Marie Gose, Quadarella, New Zealand's Erika Fairweather and France's Anastasiya Kirpichnikova also qualified, while Li did not. Singapore's Gan Ching Hwee set a new national record of 8:32.37 but did not qualify.

Results
Rank	Heat	Lane	Swimmer	Nation	Time	Notes
1	2	4	Katie Ledecky	United States	8:16.62	Q
2	2	6	Paige Madden	United States	8:18.48	Q
3	2	5	Ariarne Titmus	Australia	8:19.87	Q
4	1	5	Lani Pallister	Australia	8:20.21	Q
5	1	3	Isabel Marie Gose	Germany	8:20.63	Q
6	2	3	Simona Quadarella	Italy	8:20.89	Q
7	1	6	Erika Fairweather	New Zealand	8:22.22	Q
8	1	2	Anastasiya Kirpichnikova	France	8:22.99	Q
9	1	4	Li Bingjie	China	8:27.92	
10	1	7	Maria Fernanda Costa	Brazil	8:32.20	
11	1	1	Gan Ching Hwee	Singapore	8:32.37	NR
12	2	2	Eve Thomas	New Zealand	8:33.25	
13	2	7	Ajna Késely	Hungary	8:36.13	
14	2	1	Agostina Hein	Argentina	8:37.43	
15	2	8	Kristel Köbrich	Chile	8:46.46	
16	1	8	Jamila Boulakbech	Tunisia	9:21.38	

== Final ==
The final took place at 21:28 on 3 August. Ledecky led from start to finish to win the gold medal with a time of 8:11.04. Titmus remained close behind Ledecky for most the race, and finished with a new Oceanic record of 8:12.29 to win silver. Madden won bronze with 8:13.00, which was her first Olympic medal, while Quadarella finished fourth with a new Italian record of 8:14.55. SwimSwam writer Yanyan Li speculated after the event that the competition in the race was "truly a sign that [Ledecky] is not quite lonely at the top anymore", as she had won by such large margins at the major events for so long. Swimming World called Madden's medal a "top swimming surprise" due to her rapid improvement leading up to the event.

Ledecky's win made her the first female Olympic swimmer to win the same event at four successive Olympics. Her win gave her her fourteenth Olympic medal. It was also her ninth gold medal, which meant she was tied for the female Olympian with the most gold medals with gymnast Larisa Latynina from Russia.

Results
Rank	Lane	Swimmer	Nation	Time	Notes
1st place, gold medalist(s)	4	Katie Ledecky	United States	8:11.04	
2nd place, silver medalist(s)	3	Ariarne Titmus	Australia	8:12.29	OC
3rd place, bronze medalist(s)	5	Paige Madden	United States	8:13.00	
4	7	Simona Quadarella	Italy	8:14.55	NR
5	2	Isabel Marie Gose	Germany	8:17.82	
6	6	Lani Pallister	Australia	8:21.09	
7	8	Anastasiya Kirpichnikova	France	8:22.80	
8	1	Erika Fairweather	New Zealand	8:23.27	

Statistics
Name	200 metre split	400 metre split	600 metre split	Time	Stroke rate (strokes/min)
Katie Ledecky	1:58.71	4:03.20	6:08.01	8:11.04	46.0
Ariarne Titmus	1:58.97	4:03.49	6:08.83	8:12.29	42.0
Paige Madden	2:01.80	4:06.50	6:10.07	8:13.00	40.5
Simona Quadarella	2:01.72	4:06.29	6:10.92	8:14.55	49.7
Isabel Marie Gose	2:02.44	4:06.96	6:12.52	8:17.82	45.8
Lani Pallister	2:01.07	4:06.26	6:13.19	8:21.09	44.4
Anastasiya Kirpichnikova	2:02.38	4:08.31	6:15.40	8:22.80	47.3
Erika Fairweather	2:02.37	4:08.46	6:17.51	8:23.27	40.1
