= Dean Boxall =

Australian swimming coach

Dean Boxall (born 1977) is an Australian swimming coach.

He is regarded as an elite coach in his field, training swimmers who compete at state, national, and international levels, including World Championships and Olympic Games. Boxall has received numerous awards for his achievements.

Boxall is head coach at Brisbane-based swim club St. Peters Western, which has a history of successful alumni including Olympians Stephanie Rice and Leisel Jones.

He is the coach of Australian swimmers Ariarne Titmus, Elijah Winnington, Mitch Larkin, Meg Harris, Mollie O'Callaghan, Abbey Harkin and Clyde Lewis.

In 2021, at the 2020 Summer Olympics, Boxall gained significant international notoriety following the success of Ariarne Titmus at the Olympic Games, particularly for his reaction to Titmus's gold medal win in the 400 metre freestyle, which was compared to Australian swim coach Laurie Lawrence's reaction when his protégé Duncan Armstrong won the 200 metre freestyle gold medal at the 1988 Summer Olympics. A video of Boxall's reaction won the 2021 Swammy Award for Viral Video of the Year.

== Early life ==
Boxall was born in South Africa and moved with his family to Brisbane when he was seven.

== Awards ==
- 2018 SwimSwam Swammy Award for Oceania Coach of the Year
- 2019 Swimming Australia Coach of the Year
- 2019 Swimming Australia Youth Coach of the Year
- 2019 Australian Swimming Coaches And Teachers Association (ASCTA) Coach of the Year
- 2020 ASCTA Age Coach of the Year
- 2020 ASCTA Youth Coach of the Year
- 2021 SwimSwam Swammy Award for Oceania Coach of the Year
- 2021 Swimming World International Coach of the Year
- 2021 SwimSwam Swammy Award for Viral Video of the Year
- 2021 Swimming Australia, Youth Coach of the Year
- 2024 - AIS Sport Performance Awards - Coach of the Year
