= Swimming at the 2024 Summer Olympics – Women's 200-metre freestyle =

Women's 200-metre freestyle at the Games of the XXXIII Olympiad
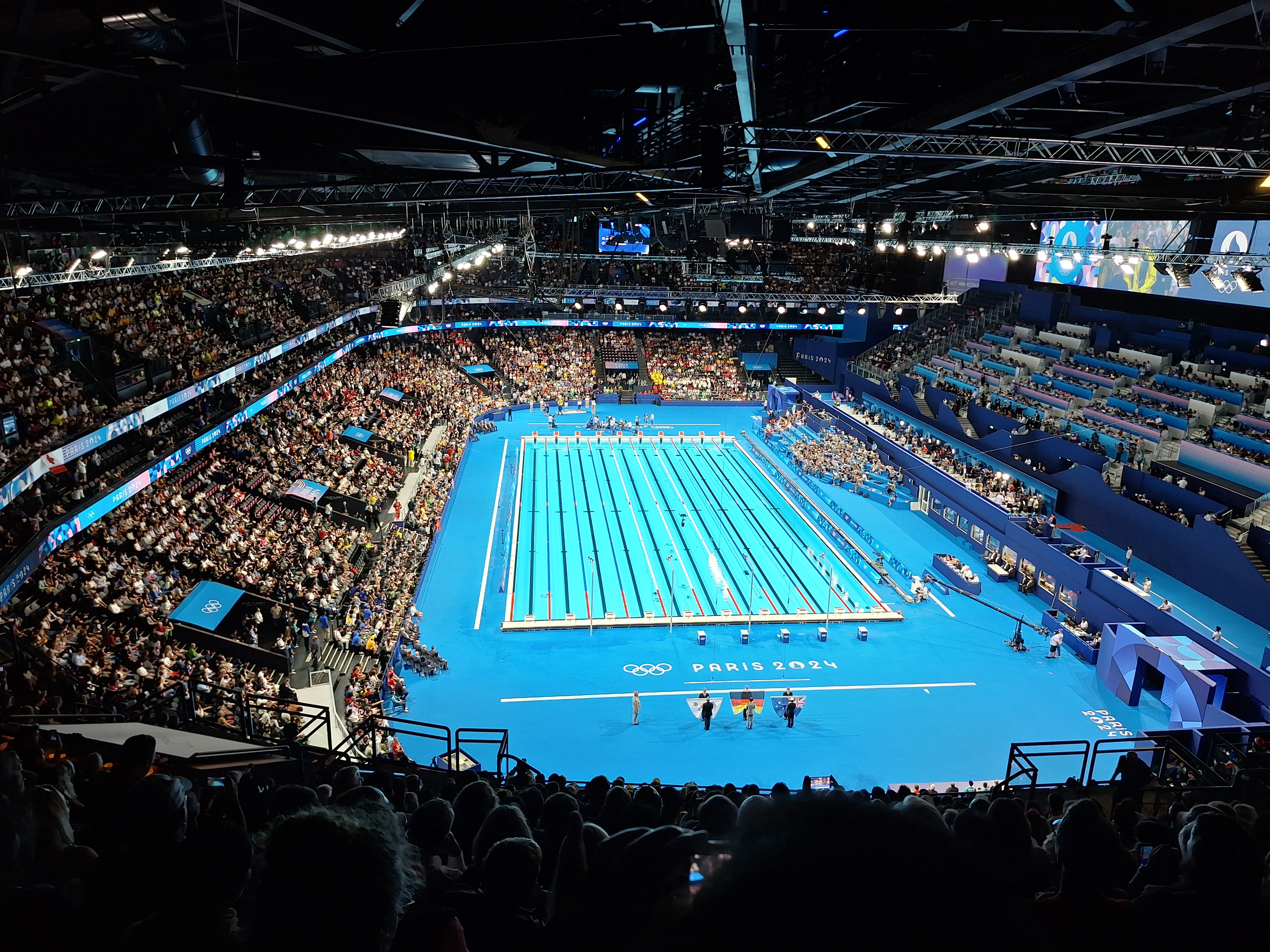
- Paris La Défense Arena after it was converted to a swimming pool for the swimming events
- Venue: Paris La Défense Arena
- Dates: 28 July 2024 (Heats and Semis); 29 July 2024 (Final)
- Competitors: 31 from 27 nations
- Winning time: 1:53.27 OR

Medalists
1st place, gold medalist(s)		Mollie O'Callaghan	Australia
2nd place, silver medalist(s)		Ariarne Titmus	Australia
3rd place, bronze medalist(s)		Siobhán Haughey	Hong Kong

The women's 200-metre freestyle event at the 2024 Summer Olympics was held on 28 and 29 July 2024 at Paris La Défense Arena, which was converted to a swimming pool for the swimming events.

Australia's defending Olympic champion and world record holder Ariarne Titmus and fellow Australian Mollie O'Callaghan were considered the favourites for the event. Other contenders included Hong Kong's Siobhán Haughey and China's Yang Junxuan. All four progressed through the heats (preliminary rounds) and semifinals to the final.

In the final, Haughey led the race for the first 150 metres, but on the final length she was overtaken by Titmus and O'Callaghan. O'Callaghan won with a new Olympic record of 1:53.27, Titmus finished second with 1:53.81 and Haughey finished third with 1:54.55.

== Background ==
Australia's Ariarne Titmus won the event at the previous Olympics, while fellow Australian Mollie O'Callaghan won it at the 2023 World Championships. At the 2024 Australian Olympic Trials, Titmus qualified with a new world record of 1:52.23. In the same race, O'Callaghan finished second with 1:52:48, which would also have been a new world record if Titmus hadn't beaten her. Hong Kong's 2024 World Champion Siobhán Haughey had the third fastest qualifying time of 1:53.96, while China's 2022 World Champion Yang Junxuan held the fourth fastest qualifying time of 1:54.37.

SwimSwam predicted Titmus would win and O'Callaghan would come second, while Swimming World predicted it would be the other way around. Both predicted Haughey would come third.

The event was held at Paris La Défense Arena, which was converted to a swimming pool for the swimming events.

== Qualification ==
Each National Olympic Committee (NOC) was permitted to enter a maximum of two qualified athletes in each individual event, but only if both of them had attained the Olympic Qualifying Time (OQT). For this event, the OQT was 1:57.26. World Aquatics then considered athletes qualifying through universality; NOCs were given one event entry for each gender, which could be used by any athlete regardless of qualification time, providing the spaces had not already been taken by athletes from that nation who had achieved the OQT. Finally, the rest of the spaces were filled by athletes who had met the Olympic Consideration Time (OCT), which was 1:57.85 for this event. In total, 16 athletes qualified through achieving the OQT, 14 athletes qualified through universality places and one athlete qualified through achieving the OCT.

Top 10 fastest qualification times
Swimmer	Country	Time	Competition
Ariarne Titmus	Australia	1:52.23	2024 Australian Olympic Trials
Mollie O'Callaghan	Australia	1:52.48	2024 Australian Olympic Trials
Siobhán Haughey	Hong Kong	1:53.96	2023 World Aquatics Championships
Yang Junxuan	China	1:54.37	2024 Chinese Championships
Barbora Seemanová	Czech Republic	1:55.12	2024 AP Race London International
Claire Weinstein	United States	1:55.26	2023 United States National Championships
Mary-Sophie Harvey	Canada	1:55.44	2024 Canadian Olympic Trials
Erika Fairweather	New Zealand	1:55.45	2024 New Zealand Championships
Li Bingjie	China	1:55.73	2024 Chinese Championships
Erin Gemmell	United States	1:55.97	2023 World Aquatics Championships

== Heats ==
Four heats (preliminary rounds) took place on 28 July 2024, starting at 12:00. (Note: All times are Central European Summer Time (UTC+2)) The swimmers with the best 16 times in the heats advanced to the semifinals. O'Callaghan qualified with the fastest time of 1:55.79, while Titmus, Haughey and Yang also all qualified.

Results
Rank	Heat	Lane	Swimmer	Nation	Time	Notes
1	3	4	Mollie O'Callaghan	Australia	1:55.79	Q
2	4	3	Mary-Sophie Harvey	Canada	1:56.21	Q
3	4	4	Ariarne Titmus	Australia	1:56.23	Q
4	2	3	Li Bingjie	China	1:56.28	Q
5	2	4	Siobhán Haughey	Hong Kong	1:56.38	Q
6	2	5	Claire Weinstein	United States	1:56.48	Q
7	3	3	Erika Fairweather	New Zealand	1:56.54	Q
8	2	6	Maria Fernanda Costa	Brazil	1:56.65	Q
9	4	5	Yang Junxuan	China	1:56.83	Q
10	3	5	Barbora Seemanová	Czech Republic	1:57.02	Q
11	4	6	Erin Gemmell	United States	1:57.23	Q
12	3	2	Valentine Dumont	Belgium	1:57.50	Q
13	2	2	Lilla Minna Ábrahám	Hungary	1:57.77	Q
14	4	2	Aimee Canny	South Africa	1:57.81	Q
15	3	7	Snæfríður Jórunnardóttir	Iceland	1:58.32	Q
16	4	1	Rebecca Diaconescu	Romania	1:59.29	Q
17	4	7	Julia Mrozinski	Germany	1:59.87	
18	2	1	Batbayaryn Enkhkhüslen	Mongolia	1:59.94	NR
19	2	7	Lea Polonsky	Israel	2:00.38	
20	3	1	María Yegres	Venezuela	2:00.66	
21	4	8	Andrea Becali	Cuba	2:03.38	
22	3	8	Julimar Ávila	Honduras	2:04.88	
23	1	4	Dhinidhi Desinghu	India	2:06.96	
24	2	8	Lojine Abdalla Salah	Egypt	2:07.19	
25	1	5	Ariana Southa Dirkzwager	Laos	2:07.22	NR
26	1	3	Jehanara Nabi	Pakistan	2:10.69	
27	1	6	Kaltra Meca	Albania	2:12.21	
28	1	7	Maha Al-Shehhi	United Arab Emirates	2:17.17	NR
29	1	1	Mashael Meshari A Alayed	Saudi Arabia	2:19.61	NR
30	1	2	Duana Lama	Nepal	2:20.74	
	3	6	Nikolett Pádár	Hungary	DSQ	

== Semifinals ==
Two semifinals took place on 28 July, starting at 21:50. The swimmers with the best eight times in the semifinals advanced to the final. The US' Claire Weinstein won the first semifinal with the third fastest qualifying time of 1:55.24, while Titmus won the second semifinal with the fastest qualifying time of 1:54.64. O'Callaghan, Haughey, Yang, Barbora Seemanová of the Czech Republic, Erika Fairweather of New Zealand and Canada's Mary-Sophie Harvey also qualified.

Results
Rank	Heat	Lane	Swimmer	Nation	Time	Notes
1	2	5	Ariarne Titmus	Australia	1:54.64	Q
2	2	4	Mollie O'Callaghan	Australia	1:54.70	Q
3	1	3	Claire Weinstein	United States	1:55.24	Q
4	2	3	Siobhán Haughey	Hong Kong	1:55.51	Q
5	2	2	Yang Junxuan	China	1:55.90	Q
6	1	2	Barbora Seemanová	Czech Republic	1:56.06	Q
7	2	6	Erika Fairweather	New Zealand	1:56.31	Q
8	1	4	Mary-Sophie Harvey	Canada	1:56.37	Q
9	2	7	Erin Gemmell	United States	1:56.46	
10	1	5	Li Bingjie	China	1:56.56	
11	1	6	Maria Fernanda Costa	Brazil	1:56.89	
12	1	1	Aimee Canny	South Africa	1:57.34	
13	1	7	Valentine Dumont	Belgium	1:57.50	
14	2	1	Lilla Minna Ábrahám	Hungary	1:57.78	
15	2	8	Snæfríður Jórunnardóttir	Iceland	1:58.78	
16	1	8	Rebecca Diaconescu	Romania	1:59.58	

== Final ==
The final took place at 21:53 on 29 July. Haughey led the race for the first 150 metres, but on the final length she was overtaken by O'Callaghan and Titmus. During the underwater of the final length, O'Callaghan also overtook Titmus to win gold with a new Olympic record of 1:53.27. Titmus won silver with 1:53.81 and Haughey won bronze with 1:54.55.

Results
Rank	Lane	Swimmer	Nation	Time	Notes
1st place, gold medalist(s)	5	Mollie O'Callaghan	Australia	1:53.27	OR
2nd place, silver medalist(s)	4	Ariarne Titmus	Australia	1:53.81	
3rd place, bronze medalist(s)	6	Siobhán Haughey	Hong Kong	1:54.55	
4	8	Mary-Sophie Harvey	Canada	1:55.29	
5	2	Yang Junxuan	China	1:55.38	
6	7	Barbora Seemanová	Czech Republic	1:55.47	
7	1	Erika Fairweather	New Zealand	1:55.59	
8	3	Claire Weinstein	United States	1:56.60	

Statistics
Name	50 metre split	100 metre split	150 metre split	Time	Stroke rate (strokes/min)
Mollie O'Callaghan	27.01	56.07	1:25.29	1:53.27	41.8
Ariarne Titmus	27.00	55.88	1:25.17	1:53.81	46.9
Siobhán Haughey	26.72	55.70	1:24.97	1:54.55	45.4
Mary-Sophie Harvey	27.49	56.64	1:26.05	1:55.29	44.6
Yang Junxuan	26.87	56.05	1:25.88	1:55.38	46.0
Barbora Seemanová	26.88	55.97	1:25.73	1:55.47	43.7
Erika Fairweather	27.24	56.66	1:26.31	1:55.59	45.2
Claire Weinstein	27.42	56.74	1:26.45	1:56.60	43.7
