= Swimming at the 2024 World Aquatics Championships – Women's 400 metre freestyle =

Women's 400 metre freestyle at the 2024 World Aquatics Championships
- Venue: Aspire Dome
- Location: Doha, Qatar
- Dates: 11 February (heats and final)
- Competitors: 34 from 31 nations
- Winning time: 3:59.44

Medalists
gold medal	Erika Fairweather	New Zealand
silver medal	Li Bingjie	China
bronze medal	Isabel Gose	Germany

The women's 400 metre freestyle competition at the 2024 World Aquatics Championships was held on 11 February 2024.

== Qualification ==
Each National Federation was permitted to enter a maximum of two qualified athletes in each individual event, but only if both of them had attained the "A" standard qualification time at approved qualifying events. For this event, the "A" standard qualification time was 4:10.57. Federations could enter one athlete into the event if they met the "B" standard qualification time. For this event, the "B" standard qualification time was 4:19.34. Athletes could also enter the event if they had met an "A" or "B" standard in a different event and their Federation had not entered anyone else. Additional considerations applied to Federations who had few swimmers enter through the standard qualification times. Federations in this category could at least enter two men and two women into the competition, all of whom could enter into up to two events.

== Records ==
Prior to the competition, the existing world and championship records were as follows.

World record	Ariarne Titmus (AUS)	3:55.38	Fukuoka, Japan	23 July 2023
Competition record	Ariarne Titmus (AUS)	3:55.38	Fukuoka, Japan	23 July 2023

== Results ==
=== Heats ===
The heats were started at 10:46.

Rank	Heat	Lane	Name	Nationality	Time	Notes
1	4	5	Li Bingjie	China	4:04.65	Q
2	4	4	Erika Fairweather	New Zealand	4:04.70	Q
3	3	4	Isabel Marie Gose	Germany	4:05.48	Q
4	4	2	Maria Fernanda Costa	Brazil	4:05.52	Q, SA
5	4	3	Eve Thomas	New Zealand	4:06.12	Q
6	4	6	Gabrielle Roncatto	Brazil	4:06.13	Q
7	3	3	Yang Peiqi	China	4:06.82	Q
8	4	8	Agostina Hein	Argentina	4:08.86	Q
9	4	7	Nikolett Pádár	Hungary	4:09.21	
10	4	0	Ichika Kajimoto	Japan	4:09.65	
11	3	1	Addison Sauickie	United States	4:09.67	
12	3	5	Kiah Melverton	Australia	4:10.61	
13	3	6	Valentine Dumont	Belgium	4:10.96	
14	4	9	Duné Coetzee	South Africa	4:12.03	
15	3	7	Anastasiya Kirpichnikova	France	4:13.95	
16	3	8	Imani de Jong	Netherlands	4:14.20	
17	2	4	Daria Golovaty	Israel	4:14.42	
18	3	0	Merve Tuncel	Turkey	4:14.47	
19	2	5	Gan Ching Hwee	Singapore	4:14.54	
20	4	1	Francisca Soares	Portugal	4:15.04	
21	3	2	Ella Jansen	Canada	4:17.01	
22	2	2	Maria Yegres	Venezuela	4:17.65	
23	2	3	Diana Taszhanova	Kazakhstan	4:18.15	
24	3	9	Han Da-kyung	South Korea	4:18.38	
25	2	6	Elisbet Gámez	Cuba	4:19.91	
26	2	1	Lisa Pou	Monaco	4:22.61	
27	2	8	Eva Petrovska	North Macedonia	4:25.21	
28	2	0	Harper Barrowman	Cayman Islands	4:27.30	
29	2	7	Ma Gilaine	Hong Kong	4:27.52	
30	1	5	Malak Meqdar	Morocco	4:36.32	
31	2	9	Kaltra Meca	Albania	4:40.47	
32	1	4	Duana Lama	Nepal	4:45.85	
33	1	6	Mashael Alayed	Saudi Arabia	4:56.42	
	1	3	Karin Belbeisi	Jordan	Disqualified	

=== Final ===
The final was held at 19:32.

Rank	Lane	Name	Nationality	Time	Notes
1st place, gold medalist(s)	5	Erika Fairweather	New Zealand	3:59.44	NR
2nd place, silver medalist(s)	4	Li Bingjie	China	4:01.62	
3rd place, bronze medalist(s)	3	Isabel Gose	Germany	4:02.39	NR
4	6	Maria Fernanda Costa	Brazil	4:02.86	SA
5	7	Gabrielle Roncatto	Brazil	4:04.18	
6	1	Yang Peiqi	China	4:05.73	
7	2	Eve Thomas	New Zealand	4:05.87	
8	8	Agostina Hein	Argentina	4:10.33	

== Sources ==
- "Competition Regulations" (PDF). World Aquatics. Archived (PDF) from the original on 15 February 2026.
