= Swimming at the 2023 World Aquatics Championships – Women's 800 metre freestyle =

Women's 800 metre freestyle at the 2023 World Aquatics Championships
- Venue: Marine Messe Fukuoka
- Location: Fukuoka, Japan
- Dates: 28 July (heats); 29 July (final)
- Competitors: 34 from 25 nations
- Winning time: 8:08.87

Medalists
gold medal	Katie Ledecky	United States
silver medal	Li Bingjie	China
bronze medal	Ariarne Titmus	Australia

The women's 800 metre freestyle competition at the 2023 World Aquatics Championships was held on 28 and 29 July 2023.

== Records ==
Prior to the competition, the existing world and championship records were as follows.

World record	Katie Ledecky (USA)	8:04.79	Rio de Janeiro, Brazil	12 August 2016
Competition record	Katie Ledecky (USA)	8:07.39	Kazan, Russia	8 August 2015

== Results ==
=== Heats ===
The heats were started on 28 July at 12:13.

Rank	Heat	Lane	Name	Nationality	Time	Notes
1	4	4	Katie Ledecky	United States	8:15.60	Q
2	3	6	Li Bingjie	China	8:20.51	Q
3	3	5	Erika Fairweather	New Zealand	8:21.06	Q
4	3	4	Ariarne Titmus	Australia	8:21.25	Q
5	4	5	Lani Pallister	Australia	8:21.38	Q
6	4	3	Simona Quadarella	Italy	8:21.65	Q
7	3	3	Isabel Gose	Germany	8:21.71	Q
8	4	6	Jillian Cox	United States	8:22.20	Q
9	4	7	Anastasiia Kirpichnikova	France	8:22.74	
10	4	0	Ajna Késely	Hungary	8:28.23	
11	3	1	Waka Kobori	Japan	8:29.54	
12	4	1	Eve Thomas	New Zealand	8:31.72	
13	3	0	Beatriz Dizotti	Brazil	8:32.42	
14	2	6	Alisée Pisane	Belgium	8:32.52	NR
15	3	7	Deniz Ertan	Turkey	8:32.54	
16	4	8	Miyu Namba	Japan	8:34.62	
17	2	8	Gan Ching Hwee	Singapore	8:36.31	
18	2	2	Emma Finlin	Canada	8:36.47	
19	2	5	Kristel Köbrich	Chile	8:37.09	
20	4	2	Yang Peiqi	China	8:37.16	
21	4	9	Jimena Pérez Blanco	Spain	8:37.40	
22	3	2	Merve Tuncel	Turkey	8:39.47	
23	3	8	Ángela Martínez	Spain	8:39.60	
24	2	3	Bettina Fábián	Hungary	8:39.63	
25	3	9	Tamila Holub	Portugal	8:42.90	
26	2	7	Han Da-kyung	South Korea	8:43.68	
27	2	4	Gabrielle Roncatto	Brazil	8:48.36	
28	2	0	Artemis Vasilaki	Greece	8:49.61	
29	2	1	Imani de Jong	Netherlands	8:50.81	
30	1	6	Diana Taszhanova	Kazakhstan	8:51.46	NR
31	1	4	María Bramont-Arias	Peru	8:59.52	
32	1	5	Eva Petrovska	North Macedonia	9:06.00	
33	1	3	Sasha Gatt	Malta	9:08.63	
34	2	9	Võ Thị Mỹ Tiên	Vietnam	9:15.23	

=== Final ===
The final was held on 29 July at 21:23.

Rank	Lane	Name	Nationality	Time	Notes
1st place, gold medalist(s)	4	Katie Ledecky	United States	8:08.87	
2nd place, silver medalist(s)	5	Li Bingjie	China	8:13.31	AS
3rd place, bronze medalist(s)	6	Ariarne Titmus	Australia	8:13.59	=OC
4	7	Simona Quadarella	Italy	8:16.46	
5	1	Isabel Gose	Germany	8:17.95	
6	8	Jillian Cox	United States	8:19.73	
7	2	Lani Pallister	Australia	8:21.33	
8	3	Erika Fairweather	New Zealand	8:28.21	
