= Ariarne Titmus =

Australian swimmer (born 2000)

Ariarne Titmus OAM
Personal information
- Full name: Ariarne Elizabeth Titmus
- Nicknames: Arnie, Terminator
- Born: 7 September 2000 (age 26) Launceston, Tasmania, Australia
- Height: 1.77 m (5 ft 10 in)
- Weight: 63 kg (139 lb)

Sport
- Sport: Swimming
- Strokes: Freestyle
- Club: Cali Condors; St Peters Western
- Coach: Dean Boxall
Medal record
Women's swimming
Representing Australia
Event	1st	2nd	3rd
Olympic Games	4	3	1
World Championships (LC)	4	2	3
World Championships (SC)	2	0	2
Pan Pacific Championships	1	2	0
Commonwealth Games	7	1	0
Total	18	8	6
Olympic Games
Gold medal – first place	2020 Tokyo	200 m freestyle
Gold medal – first place	2020 Tokyo	400 m freestyle
Gold medal – first place	2024 Paris	400 m freestyle
Gold medal – first place	2024 Paris	4×200 m freestyle
Silver medal – second place	2020 Tokyo	800 m freestyle
Silver medal – second place	2024 Paris	200 m freestyle
Silver medal – second place	2024 Paris	800 m freestyle
Bronze medal – third place	2020 Tokyo	4×200 m freestyle
World Championships (LC)
Gold medal – first place	2019 Gwangju	400 m freestyle
Gold medal – first place	2019 Gwangju	4×200 m freestyle
Gold medal – first place	2023 Fukuoka	400 m freestyle
Gold medal – first place	2023 Fukuoka	4×200 m freestyle
Silver medal – second place	2019 Gwangju	200 m freestyle
Silver medal – second place	2023 Fukuoka	200 m freestyle
Bronze medal – third place	2017 Budapest	4×200 m freestyle
Bronze medal – third place	2019 Gwangju	800 m freestyle
Bronze medal – third place	2023 Fukuoka	800 m freestyle
World Championships (SC)
Gold medal – first place	2018 Hangzhou	200 m freestyle
Gold medal – first place	2018 Hangzhou	400 m freestyle
Bronze medal – third place	2018 Hangzhou	4×50 m freestyle
Bronze medal – third place	2018 Hangzhou	4×200 m freestyle
Pan Pacific Championships
Gold medal – first place	2018 Tokyo	4×200 m freestyle
Silver medal – second place	2018 Tokyo	400 m freestyle
Silver medal – second place	2018 Tokyo	800 m freestyle
Commonwealth Games
Gold medal – first place	2018 Gold Coast	400 m freestyle
Gold medal – first place	2018 Gold Coast	800 m freestyle
Gold medal – first place	2018 Gold Coast	4×200 m freestyle
Gold medal – first place	2022 Birmingham	200 m freestyle
Gold medal – first place	2022 Birmingham	400 m freestyle
Gold medal – first place	2022 Birmingham	800 m freestyle
Gold medal – first place	2022 Birmingham	4×200 m freestyle
Silver medal – second place	2018 Gold Coast	200 m freestyle
Junior Pan Pacific Championships
Silver medal – second place	2016 Maui	4×200 m freestyle
Bronze medal – third place	2016 Maui	400 m freestyle

Ariarne Elizabeth Titmus OAM (born 7 September 2000) is a retired Australian swimmer. She is the reigning Olympic champion in the women's 400-metre freestyle, having won the event at the 2020 Summer Olympics and the 2024 Summer Olympics, and the world record holder in the long course 200-metre freestyle. Titmus is widely considered one of the greatest middle-distance swimmers of all time. In 2019 and 2020, she competed representing the Cali Condors in the International Swimming League.

== Background ==
In 2015, when Titmus was 14 years old, she and her family, including father Steve Titmus, moved from Tasmania to Queensland for better training opportunities. She initially attended secondary school at St Patrick's College Launceston before switching to St Peter's Lutheran College in Brisbane. Titmus first trained as a swimmer at Launceston Leisure and Aquatic Centre. She is coached by Dean Boxall, who formerly coached Stephanie Rice and Leisel Jones. Titmus is a supporter of the Hawthorn Hawks in the Australian Football League.

== Swimming career ==
=== 2016–2017 ===
In December 2016, Titmus made her Australian team debut at the World Championships (25 m) in Windsor, Ontario, Canada. Her first event was the 800 m freestyle, where she finished fourth in a time of 8:17.95. She then competed in the 400 m freestyle, finishing sixth in a time of 4:02.70. Her final event was the 4 × 200 m freestyle relay, in which she split 1:55.14 on the third leg; Australia finished fourth in a time of 7:40.00.

2017 World Championships
Bronze medal – third place	4×200 m freestyle	7:48.51

In July 2017, Titmus competed at the World Championships in Budapest. Her first event was the 400 m freestyle, where she came fourth in a time of 4:04.26. She then competed in the 200 m freestyle, finishing seventeenth in a time of 1:58.79. She then swam in the 4 × 200 m freestyle relay, splitting 1:56.61 on the anchor leg; Australia won the bronze medal in a time of 7:48.51. Titmus' final event was the 800 m freestyle; she finished fourteenth in a time of 8:37.10.

In December 2017, Titmus competed at the Queensland Championships in Brisbane. She went 4:02.86 in the 400 m freestyle, breaking Jessica Ashwood's Australian record of 4:03.34 from 2015.

=== 2018 ===
In February–March 2018, Titmus competed at the Australian Trials on the Gold Coast. She went 4:02.36 to set another Australian record in the 400 m freestyle.

2018 Commonwealth Games
Gold medal – first place	400 m freestyle	4:00.93 (GR, OC)
Gold medal – first place	800 m freestyle	8:20.02
Gold medal – first place	4×200 m freestyle	7:48.04 (GR)
Silver medal – second place	200 m freestyle	1:54.85

In April 2018, Titmus competed at the Commonwealth Games on the Gold Coast. She won the silver medal in the 200 m freestyle in a time of 1:54.85, 0.04 behind Canada's Taylor Ruck. Titmus then competed in the 4 × 200 m freestyle relay. She split 1:55.59 on the anchor leg, securing the gold medal in an overall time of 7:48.04; Australia broke the games record of 7:49.90 set by the nation in 2014. Titmus then swam in the 800 m freestyle, winning the gold medal in a personal best time of 8:20.02. Her final event was the 400 m freestyle, which she won in a time of 4:00.93. Titmus' time was a new games record, surpassing the mark of 4:04.47 set by New Zealand's Lauren Boyle in 2014, and was also a new Australian record.

2018 Pan Pacific Championships
Gold medal – first place	4×200 m freestyle	7:44.12 (CR, OC)
Silver medal – second place	400 m freestyle	3:59.66 (OC)
Silver medal – second place	800 m freestyle	8:17.07 (OC)

In August 2018, Titmus competed at the Pan Pacific Championships in Tokyo. Her first event was the 800 m freestyle, in which she won the silver medal in a time of 8:17.07, breaking Ashwood's Australian record of 8:18.14 from 2016. Titmus then competed in the 4 × 200 m freestyle relay, splitting 1:55.27 on the first leg to give Australia an early lead. Australia won the gold medal in a time of 7:44.12, which broke the national record of 7:44.31 from 2008, and the championship record, set by the US in 2014, of 7:46.40. Titmus' final event was the 400 m freestyle. She won the silver medal in an Australian record time of 3:59.66, becoming the third woman to break the four-minute mark in the event.

2018 World Championships (25 m)
Gold medal – first place	200 m freestyle	1:51.38 (OC)
Gold medal – first place	400 m freestyle	3:53.92 (WR)
Bronze medal – third place	4×50 m freestyle	1:36.34 (heat swimmer)
Bronze medal – third place	4×200 m freestyle	7:36.40 (OC)

In December 2018, Titmus competed at the World Championships (25 m) in Hangzhou. Her first event was the 200 m freestyle, winning the gold medal in a time of 1:51.38. This was a new Australian record, surpassing Emma McKeon's mark of 1:51.66 from 2015. She then competed in the 400 m freestyle; she won the gold medal in a world record time of 3:53.92, surpassing the mark of 3:53.97 set by China's Wang Jianjiahe in October 2018. She then competed in the 4 × 200 m freestyle relay, splitting 1:52.22 on the first leg. Australia won the bronze medal in a time of 7:36.40, breaking the national record of 7:37.57 from 2010. Titmus' final event was the 4 × 50 m freestyle relay, where she split 24.71 on the second leg in the heats, before being replaced by Emily Seebohm in the final. Australia eventually won the bronze medal.

=== 2019–2020 ===
In April 2019, Titmus competed at the Australian Championships in Adelaide. She went 1:54.30 in the 200 m freestyle, breaking the Australian record of 1:54.83 set by McKeon in 2016. Titmus then went 3:59.66 in the 400 m freestyle, equalling her own Australian record.

In June 2019, Titmus competed at the Australian Trials in Brisbane. She went 3:59.35 in the 400 m freestyle, breaking the Australian record.

2019 World Championships
Gold medal – first place	400 m freestyle	3:58.76 (OC)
Gold medal – first place	4×200 m freestyle	7:41.50 (WR)
Silver medal – second place	200 m freestyle	1:54.66
Bronze medal – third place	800 m freestyle	8:15.70 (OC)

In July 2019, Titmus competed at the World Championships in Gwangju. She won the gold medal in the 400 m freestyle, a full second ahead of the US' Katie Ledecky; Titmus improved her Australian record to 3:58.76. She then competed in the 200 m freestyle, winning the silver medal in a time of 1:54.66. Her next event was the 4 × 200 m freestyle relay, where on the first leg, she went 1:54.27 to set a new Australian record in the 200 m freestyle. Australia won the gold medal in a final time of 7:51.50, breaking China's world record of 7:42.08 from 2009. Titmus' final event was the 800 m freestyle, in which she won the bronze medal in an Australian record time of 8:15.70.

From October–December 2019, Titmus competed in the inaugural season of the International Swimming League, representing the Cali Condors, who finished in third place in the final match in Las Vegas, Nevada, in December. Titmus won the 400-metre freestyle several times throughout the season, including the final.

In October 2020, Titmus competed at the Australian Championships. She went 3:54.58 in the short course 400 m freestyle, which was at the time, the sixth-fastest time in history.

=== 2021 ===
In June 2021, Titmus competed at the Australian Trials in Adelaide. She went 3:56.90 in the 400 m freestyle, which was a new Australian record and 0.44 slower than the world record. She then competed in the 200 m freestyle, swimming a time of 1:53.09 to set another Australian record, missing the world record by 0.11. Her final event was the 800 m freestyle, which she won in an Australian record time of 8:15.57.

In July 2021, Titmus competed at the 2020 Summer Olympics in Tokyo. She went 3:56.69 in the 400 m freestyle, winning the gold medal 0.66 seconds ahead of Ledecky, setting a new Australian record in the process. Her next event was the 200 m freestyle, in which she trailed behind Hong Kong's Siobhán Haughey for the first 3 laps, before taking the lead on the final lap to win the gold medal in a time of 1:53.50. Titmus broke the Olympic record of 1:53.61 set by the US' Allison Schmitt in 2012. Titmus' next event was the 4 × 200 m freestyle relay, in which she split 1:54.51 on the first leg; Australia won the bronze medal in a national record of 7:41.29. The gold medal was won by China, who set a world record of 7:40.33. Titmus' final event was the 800 m freestyle. She won the silver medal in a time of 8:13.83, which was a new Australian record.

=== 2022 ===
In May 2022, Titmus competed at the Australian Championships in Adelaide. She went 1:53.31 in the 200 m freestyle, which was then the third-fastest time in history. She went 3:56.40 in the 400 m freestyle, breaking Ledecky's world record of 3:56.46 from 2016; Titmus' mark stood until March 2023. She qualified for the Commonwealth Games, but opted out of the World Championships.

2022 Commonwealth Games
Gold medal – first place	200 m freestyle	1:53.89 (GR)
Gold medal – first place	400 m freestyle	3:58.06 (GR)
Gold medal – first place	800 m freestyle	8:13.59 (CR, OC)
Gold medal – first place	4×200 m freestyle	7:39.29 (WR)

In July–August 2022, Titmus competed at the Commonwealth Games in Birmingham. Her first event was the 200 m freestyle. She led for most of the race, before receiving a late challenge from compatriot Mollie O'Callaghan. Titmus held on to win the gold medal in a time of 1:53.89, breaking Ruck's games record of 1:54.81 from 2018. Titmus then competed in the 4 × 200 m freestyle relay. She split 1:52.82 on the anchor leg, which was then the fastest relay split in history. Australia won the gold medal in a time of 7:39.29, breaking China's world record from 2021. Titmus' next event was the 800 m freestyle. She won the gold medal in a time of 8:13.59, breaking the games record of 8:18.11 set by Jazmin Carlin of Wales in 2014. It was also a new Australian record. Her final event was the 400 m freestyle, in which she won the gold medal in a games record time of 3:58.06.

2023 World Championships
Gold medal – first place	400 m freestyle	3:55.38 (WR)
Gold medal – first place	4×200 m freestyle	7:37.50 (WR)
Silver medal – second place	200 m freestyle	1:53.01
Bronze medal – third place	800 m freestyle	8:13.59 (=OC)

=== 2023 ===
In July 2023, Titmus competed at the World Championships in Fukuoka. Her first event was the 400 m freestyle. It was set up as a clash between the reigning Olympic champion (Titmus), defending world champion (Ledecky), and current world record holder (Summer McIntosh). Titmus led for most of the race, finishing in a time of 3:55.38 to break McIntosh's world record of 3:56.08; Titmus won by more than 3 seconds. Her next event was the 200 m freestyle. She again led for most of the race, but was overtaken by O'Callaghan in the closing stages. Titmus won the silver medal in a personal best time of 1:53.01, while O'Callaghan broke the world record. Titmus then competed in the 4 × 200 m freestyle relay. She split 1:52.41 on the anchor leg, which was the fastest relay split in history. Australia won the gold medal in a world record time of 7:37.50. Titmus' final event was the 800 m freestyle. She won the bronze medal in a time of 8:13.59, which equalled her own Australian record.

=== 2024–2025 ===
In June 2024, Titmus competed at the Australian Trials in Brisbane. She won the 400 m freestyle in a time of 3:55.44, which was then the second-fastest time in history. She then competed in the 200 m freestyle. She and O'Callaghan were separated by no more than 0.25 for the entire race; Titmus won in a time of 1:52.23, breaking O'Callaghan's world record of 1:52.85 from 2023, and finishing 0.25 ahead of O'Callaghan. Titmus then competed in the 800 m freestyle, winning in a time of 8:14.06.

In July–August 2024, Titmus competed at the Olympics in Paris. Her first event was the 400 m freestyle, which was a rematch of what transpired in 2023. Titmus went 3:57.49 to win the gold medal. She then competed in the 200 m freestyle, winning the silver medal in a time of 1:53.81; her Olympic record was broken by gold medallist O'Callaghan. It was Australia's first gold-silver sweep in any Olympic event since 2004. Titmus then competed in the 4 × 200 m freestyle relay, splitting 1:52.95 on the anchor leg. Australia won the gold medal in an Olympic record time of 7:38.08, then the second-fastest time in history. Titmus' final event was the 800 m freestyle. She won the silver medal in a time of 8:12.29, breaking her own Australian record.

In January 2025, Titmus announced that she would opt out of the World Championships in Singapore.

In October 2025, Titmus retired from swimming at the age of 25.

== Television work ==
In December 2022, Titmus was a poolside interviewer at the World Championships (25 m) in Melbourne. It was broadcast by Nine Network. She returned to broadcasting during her sabbatical year in 2025, working as a poolside interviewer at the Australian Trials in Adelaide, and the World Championships in Singapore. She continued to work in broadcasting after her retirement from swimming.

== Career best times ==
=== Long course metres (50 m pool) ===
As of 1 December 2025

Event	Time	Meet	Location	Date	Notes
50 m freestyle	26.08	Australian Championships	Adelaide, Australia	18 May 2022	
100 m freestyle	53.68	Australian Championships	Adelaide, Australia	18 May 2022	
200 m freestyle	1:52.23	Australian Trials	Brisbane, Australia	12 June 2024	WR
400 m freestyle	3:55.38	World Championships	Fukuoka, Japan	23 July 2023	OC^{[A]}
800 m freestyle	8:12.29	Olympic Games	Paris, France	3 August 2024	^{[C]}
1500 m freestyle	16:09.87	Pan Pacific Championships Trials	Adelaide, Australia	30 June 2018	
400 m individual medley	4:46.61	Pan Pacific Championships Trials	Adelaide, Australia	1 July 2018	

Legend: WR – World record; OC – Oceanian record; CR – Commonwealth record; NR – Australian record; e – equalled existing record;
Records not set in finals: h – heat; sf – semifinal; r – relay 1st leg; rh – relay heat 1st leg; b – B final; † – en route to final mark; so – swim-off; tt – time trial

=== Short course metres (25 m pool) ===
As of 1 December 2025

Event	Time	Meet	Location	Date	Notes
50 m freestyle	26.43	World Championships	Hangzhou, China	15 December 2018	
100 m freestyle	53.32	International Swimming League	Las Vegas, United States	20 December 2019	
200 m freestyle	1:51.38	World Championships	Hangzhou, China	11 December 2018	^{[B]}
400 m freestyle	3:53.92	World Championships	Hangzhou, China	14 December 2018	^{[A]}
800 m freestyle	8:13.41	Australian Championships	Melbourne, Australia	25 October 2018	

Legend: WR – World record; OC – Oceanian record; CR – Commonwealth record; NR – Australian record; e – equalled existing record;
Records not set in finals: h – heat; sf – semifinal; r – relay 1st leg; rh – relay heat 1st leg; b – B final; † – en route to final mark; so – swim-off; tt – time trial

=== Notes ===
1. Former World record.
2. Former Commonwealth and Oceanian record.
3. Former Oceanian record.

== World records ==
=== Long course metres ===
No.	Event	Time	Meet	Location	Date	Status	Ref
1	4x200 m freestyle relay^{[a]}	7:41.50	2019 World Aquatic Championships	Gwangju, South Korea	25 July 2019	Former	
2	400 m freestyle	3:56.40	2022 Australian Swimming Championships	Adelaide, Australia	22 May 2022	Former	
3	4 × 200 m freestyle relay^{[b]}	7:39.29	2022 Commonwealth Games	Birmingham, United Kingdom	31 July 2022	Former	
4	400 m freestyle	3:55.38	2023 World Aquatics Championships	Fukuoka, Japan	23 July 2023	Former	
5	4 × 200 m freestyle relay^{[c]}	7:37.50	2023 World Aquatics Championships	Fukuoka, Japan	27 July 2023	Current	
6	200 m freestyle	1:52.23	2024 Australian Swimming Trials	Brisbane, Australia	12 June 2024	Current	

^{a} split 1:54.27 (1st leg); with Madison Wilson (2nd leg), Brianna Throssell (3rd leg), Emma McKeon (4th leg)
^{b} split 1:52.82 (4th leg); with Wilson (1st leg), Kiah Melverton (2nd leg), Mollie O'Callaghan (3rd leg)
^{c} split 1:52.41 (4th leg); with O'Callaghan (1st leg), Shayna Jack (2nd leg), Throssell (3rd leg)

=== Short course metres ===
No.	Event	Time	Meet	Location	Date	Status	Ref
1	400 m freestyle	3:53.92	2018 World Championships (25 m)	Hangzhou, China	14 December 2018	Former	

== Olympic records ==
=== Long course metres ===
No.	Event	Time	Meet	Location	Date	Status	Ref
1	200 m freestyle	1:53.50	2020 Summer Olympics	Tokyo, Japan	28 July 2021	Former	
2	4x200 m freestyle relay^{[a]}	7:38.08	2024 Summer Olympics	Paris, France	1 August 2024	Current	

Legend: WR – World record; OC – Oceanian record; NR – Australian record; e – equalled existing record;
Records not set in finals: h – heat; sf – semifinal; r – relay 1st leg; rh – relay heat 1st leg; b – B final; † – en route to final mark; so – swim-off; tt – time trial

^{a} split 1:52.95 (4th leg) with Mollie O'Callaghan (1st leg), Lani Pallister (2nd leg), Brianna Throssell (3rd leg)

== Awards and honours ==
- Swimming Australia, Swimmer of the Year: 2019
- Swimming Australia, Short Course Swimmer of the Year: 2019
- Swimming Australia, Patron's Award: 2019
- SwimSwam, Top 100 (Women's): 2021 (#10), 2022 (#3)
- Olympics.com, Top 5 Moments: Swimming at the 2020 Summer Olympics (#1)
- Medal of the Order of Australia, 2022
- Nominee for Laureus World Sports Award in Breakthrough of the Year: 2022
- Launceston City Council name the Launceston Leisure and Aquatic Centre competition pool the Ariarne Titmus Competition Pool.
- Nike commission a large mural of her at the Launceston Leisure and Aquatic Centre by artist Josh Foley.

Records
Preceded by (Australia) Mollie O'Callaghan	Women's 200-metre freestyle world record-holder (long course); 12 June 2024 –	Succeeded by Incumbent
Preceded by (United States) Katie Ledecky (Canada) Summer McIntosh	Women's 400-metre freestyle world record-holder (long course); 22 May 2022 – 28 March 2023; 23 July 2023 – 7 June 2025	Succeeded by (Canada) Summer McIntosh (Canada) Summer McIntosh
Preceded by (China) Wang Jianjiahe	Women's 400-metre freestyle world record-holder (short course); 14 December 2018 – 27 October 2022	Succeeded by (China) Li Bingjie
