= Maria Fernanda Costa =

Brazilian swimmer (born 2002)

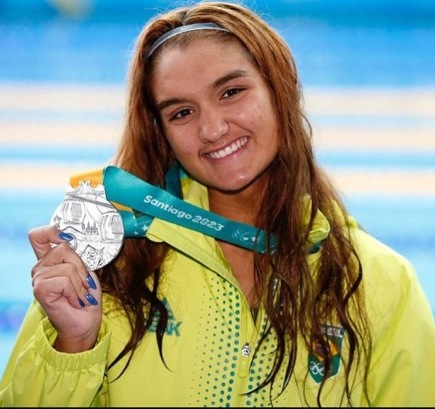
- Maria Fernanda Costa at the 2023 Pan American Games

Personal information
- Full name: Maria Fernanda de Oliveira da Silva Costa
- Nickname: Mafê
- National team: Brazil
- Born: 5 September 2002 (age 24) Rio de Janeiro, Brazil

Sport
- Sport: Swimming
- Strokes: freestyle
Medal record
Women's swimming
Representing Brazil
Pan American Games
Silver medal – second place	2023 Santiago	200 m freestyle
Silver medal – second place	2023 Santiago	400 m freestyle
Silver medal – second place	2023 Santiago	4×200 m freestyle

Maria Fernanda de Oliveira da Silva Costa (born 5 September 2002) is a Brazilian swimmer. She finished 4th in the 400m freestyle, and 5th in the 200m freestyle, at the 2024 World Championships, in Doha.

== International career ==
=== 2017–20 ===
She participated in the 2019 FINA World Junior Swimming Championships held in Budapest, Hungary.

=== 2021–24 ===
Mafe Costa made a huge improvement when he became part of the team that trains with Fernando Possenti.

In June 2023, she was Brazilian champion in the Brazil Trophy in the 200m freestyle with a time of 1:57.76 and the 400m freestyle with a time of 4:06.85.

At the 2023 World Aquatics Championships held in Fukuoka, Japan, she reached the final of the Women's 4 × 200 metre freestyle relay, finishing in 8th place. She also finished 12th in the Women's 400 metre freestyle, 20th in the Women's 200 metre freestyle and 24th in the Women's 200 metre butterfly.

At the 2023 Pan American Games held in Santiago, Chile, she won three silver medals in the Women's 400 metre freestyle with a time of 4:06.68 (near the South American record of Andreina Pinto, a time of 4:06.02), in the Women's 200 metre freestyle with a time of 1:58.12, and in the 4x200m freestyle relay where Brazil almost broke the South American record, narrowly losing to the USA.

At the 2024 World Aquatics Championships, she qualified for the 400m freestyle final with the 4th best time, breaking the South American record with a time of 4:05.52. It was the first time that a Brazilian reached the final of the 400m freestyle at the World Championships - Mafê reached the final together with her compatriot Gabrielle Roncatto. In the final, Mafê broke the South American record again, now with a mark of 4:02.86, finishing in 4th place, just 0.47s from bronze, this being the best result of all time for Brazilian women's swimming in World Championships. in Olympic events. In the 200m freestyle, Costa clocked 1:57.11 in the semi-finals, breaking the South American record, obtaining the Olympic index and Brazil's best result in the history of this event - in the women's 200m freestyle, Brazil had never qualified anyone for a final. In the 200m freestyle final, Mafê again broke her limits, once again breaking the South American record, now with a time of 1:56.85, finishing in 5th place, 0.85 seconds away from bronze. In the 4 × 200 metre freestyle relay, the team composed of Maria Fernanda Costa, Stephanie Balduccini, Aline Rodrigues and Gabrielle Roncatto obtained a historic result, reaching 4th place, Brazil's best placement in this event at the World Championships, destroying the South American record with the mark of 7:52.71. The quartet formed by Costa, Balduccini, Rodrigues and Ana Carolina Vieira also finished 6th in the 4x100m freestyle, equaling Brazil's best result in world championships in this event.

On May 7, 2024, competing in the Brazilian Olympic Swimming Trials, she broke the South American record for the 200m freestyle with a time of 1:56.37. On May 11, in the same competition, she broke the Brazilian record for the 800m freestyle with a time of 8:28.92.

=== 2024 Summer Olympics ===
At the 2024 Olympic Games in Paris, Mafê Costa reached the final of the 400m freestyle - a Brazilian woman had not reached the final of this event at the Olympics since 1948. She finished in 7th place, in her first Olympic participation, at the age of 21. She also swam the 200m freestyle, reaching the semi-finals and finishing 11th - it was the best position in the history of Brazil in the women's 200m freestyle at the Olympics. In both events, she swam close to her South American records. In the Women's 4 × 200 metre freestyle relay, Brazil qualified for the final, where she opened the race by breaking the South American record with a time of 1:56.06. Brazil finished 7th in the final.

=== 2024-28 ===
At the José Finkel Trophy, held in a short course pool, in August 2024, she broke the South American records for the 200m freestyle (1:54.46) and the 400m freestyle (3:59.33).

At the 2024 World Aquatics Swimming Championships (25 m), she broke the South American record in the 200m freestyle, opening the Brazilian 4x200m freestyle relay in the final, with a time of 1:54.22. She finished 8th in the relay, where Brazil achieved a time of 7:46.76, a South American record for the event. She also finished 9th in the 400m freestyle, 20th in the 800m freestyle and 13th in the 200m freestyle.

At the 2025 World Aquatics Championships, she finished 9th in the 400 metre freestyle and 14th in the 200 metre freestyle.

In April 2026, at the Australian Open, she broke the South American record in the 800m freestyle with a time of 8:23.98.

At the 2026 Pan Pacific Swimming Championships, she finished 5th in the 400m freestyle, 7th in the 200m freestyle, 7th in the 4x200m freestyle relay and 10th in the 800m freestyle.

== Personal bests ==
As of August 13, 2026

Long course
Event	Time	Meet	Date	Note(s)
200 m freestyle	1:56.06	2024 Summer Olympics	August 2, 2024	SA
400 m freestyle	4:02.86	2024 World Championships	February 11, 2024	SA
800 m freestyle	8:23.98	2026 Australian Open	April 6, 2026	NR

Short course
Event	Time	Meet	Date	Note(s)
200 m freestyle	1:54.22	2024 World Championships	December 12, 2024	SA
400 m freestyle	3:59.33	José Finkel Trophy	August 13, 2024	SA

== Achievements ==
=== Olympic Games ===
- 200m freestyle: 11th (Paris 2024)
- 400m freestyle: 7th (Paris 2024)
- 4x200m freestyle relay: 7th (Paris 2024)

=== FINA World Championships ===
- 200m freestyle: 5th (Doha 2024)
- 400m freestyle: 4th (Doha 2024)
- 4x200m freestyle relay: 4th (Doha 2024)
- 4x100m freestyle relay: 6th (Doha 2024)

=== Pan-Pacific ===
- 200m freestyle: 7th (Irvine 2026)
- 400m freestyle: 5th (Irvine 2026)
- 4x200m freestyle relay: 7th (Irvine 2026)
