= Poppy Wilson (swimmer) =

Australian Paralympic swimmer

Personal information
- Nickname: Popsicle
- Nationality: Australian
- Born: 2004 (age 21–22) Ipswich, Queensland

Sport
- Country: Australia
- Sport: Paralympic swimming
- Disability class: S10
- Club: Yeronga Park SC
- Coached by: Kate Sparkes

Polly Wilson (born 13 January 2004) is an Australian Paralympic swimmer. She competed at the 2024 Paris Paralympics.

== Personal life ==
Wilson was born in Ipswich, Queensland on 13 January 2004. She was diagnosed with cerebral palsy at nine months. She is a learn to swim teacher.

== Swimming ==
She focused on swimming after trying dancing, hockey, gymnastics, cheerleading, and soccer. This was due it being easier to move through water. She was classified in 2016 as a S10 swimmer. Her main events are 400 m freestyle and 100 m butterfly events. She completed at the 2023 World Para Swimming Championships, Manchester England where she finished sixth in the Women's 400 m freestyle S10.

At the 2024 Paris Paralympics, she competed in three events - Women's 100 m freestyle S10 (13th), Women's 400 m freestyle S10 (9th)and Women's 100 m butterfly S10 (5th).

She is coached by Kate Sparkes at Yeronga Park SC in Brisbane.

== Recognition ==
Wilson was awarded a Tier 2 Scholarship within the 2024 Sport Australia Hall of Fame Scholarship and Mentoring Program.
