= Mollie O'Callaghan =

Australian swimmer (born 2004)

Mollie O'Callaghan OAM
Personal information
- Full name: Mollie Grace O'Callaghan
- Born: 2 April 2004 (age 22) South Brisbane, Queensland, Australia
- Height: 1.75 m (5 ft 9 in)

Sport
- Sport: Swimming
- Strokes: Freestyle
- Club: St Peters Western Swim Club
- Coach: Dean Boxall
Medal record
Women's swimming
Representing Australia
Event	1st	2nd	3rd
Olympic Games	5	1	2
World Championships (LC)	11	6	0
World Championships (SC)	3	3	1
Commonwealth Games	9	3	0
World Junior Championships	0	1	0
Total	28	14	3
Olympic Games
Gold medal – first place	2020 Tokyo	4×100 m freestyle
Gold medal – first place	2020 Tokyo	4×100 m medley
Gold medal – first place	2024 Paris	200 m freestyle
Gold medal – first place	2024 Paris	4×100 m freestyle
Gold medal – first place	2024 Paris	4×200 m freestyle
Silver medal – second place	2024 Paris	4×100 m medley
Bronze medal – third place	2020 Tokyo	4×200 m freestyle
Bronze medal – third place	2024 Paris	4×100 m mixed medley
World Championships (LC)
Gold medal – first place	2022 Budapest	100 m freestyle
Gold medal – first place	2022 Budapest	4×100 m freestyle
Gold medal – first place	2022 Budapest	4×100 m mixed freestyle
Gold medal – first place	2023 Fukuoka	100 m freestyle
Gold medal – first place	2023 Fukuoka	200 m freestyle
Gold medal – first place	2023 Fukuoka	4×100 m freestyle
Gold medal – first place	2023 Fukuoka	4×200 m freestyle
Gold medal – first place	2023 Fukuoka	4×100 m mixed freestyle
Gold medal – first place	2025 Singapore	200 m freestyle
Gold medal – first place	2025 Singapore	4×100 m freestyle
Gold medal – first place	2025 Singapore	4×200 m freestyle
Silver medal – second place	2022 Budapest	200 m freestyle
Silver medal – second place	2022 Budapest	4×200 m freestyle
Silver medal – second place	2022 Budapest	4×100 m medley
Silver medal – second place	2023 Fukuoka	4×100 m medley
Silver medal – second place	2025 Singapore	100 m freestyle
Silver medal – second place	2025 Singapore	4×100 m medley
World Championships (SC)
Gold medal – first place	2022 Melbourne	4×100 m freestyle
Gold medal – first place	2022 Melbourne	4×200 m freestyle
Gold medal – first place	2022 Melbourne	4×50 m medley
Silver medal – second place	2022 Melbourne	100 m backstroke
Silver medal – second place	2022 Melbourne	4×50 m freestyle
Silver medal – second place	2022 Melbourne	4×100 m medley
Bronze medal – third place	2022 Melbourne	50 m backstroke
Commonwealth Games
Gold medal – first place	2022 Birmingham	100 m freestyle
Gold medal – first place	2022 Birmingham	4×100 m freestyle
Gold medal – first place	2022 Birmingham	4×200 m freestyle
Gold medal – first place	2022 Birmingham	4×100 m medley
Gold medal – first place	2022 Birmingham	4×100 m mixed freestyle
Gold medal – first place	2026 Glasgow	200 m freestyle
Gold medal – first place	2026 Glasgow	4×100 m freestyle
Gold medal – first place	2026 Glasgow	4×200 m freestyle
Gold medal – first place	2026 Glasgow	4×100 m medley
Silver medal – second place	2022 Birmingham	200 m freestyle
Silver medal – second place	2022 Birmingham	50 m backstroke
Silver medal – second place	2026 Glasgow	100 m freestyle
World Junior Championships
Silver medal – second place	2019 Budapest	4×100 m freestyle

Mollie Grace O'Callaghan OAM (born 2 April 2004) is an Australian swimmer and the reigning Olympic champion in the 200 m freestyle. She was the 2023 world champion in the women's 100m and 200m freestyle individual events, and part of the world champion 4 × 100 m and 4 × 200 m Australian women's relay teams together with 4 × 100 m mixed relay team. She former held the world record in the long course 200 m freestyle, and currently holds the world record for the short course 200 m freestyle.

O'Callaghan also won two gold and one bronze medals at the 2020 Summer Olympics as a heats swimmer in relay events and gold medal in the 200 m freestyle and 4 × 100 metre freestyle relay at the 2024 Summer Olympics.

== Career ==
=== 2021 ===
O'Callaghan swam for the Australian team in the preliminaries of all three women's relays at the 2020 Summer Olympics in Tokyo, receiving two gold medals and one bronze for her contribution. Swimming the 1st leg for Australia in the heats of the 4×100 m freestyle relay, she posted a time of 53.08 and received a gold medal after the Australian team won the final.

In the 4×200 m freestyle relay preliminaries, O'Callaghan swam a junior world record of 1:55.11 when swimming the lead off leg. Her time would have placed her fifth in the 200 m freestyle final. However, because the Australian coaches had previously decided to use four fresh swimmers in the final, O'Callaghan was not selected for the final where Australia finished third.

In a heat of the 4×100 m medley relay, O'Callaghan again posted a competitive time; her anchor leg split was 52.35, only 0.24 seconds slower than the fastest freestyle split in the final by Cate Campbell.

=== 2022 ===
O'Callaghan competed at the 2022 World Championships in Budapest. Swimming the first leg of the 4×100 m freestyle relay, she split 52.70. Australia won the gold medal in 3:30.95. In the 200 m freestyle, she won the silver medal in a time of 1:55.22. She then competed in the 4×200 m freestyle relay, swimming the anchor leg in a time of 1:55.94. Australia finished with the silver medal, recording 7:43.86. In the 100 m freestyle, O'Callaghan won the gold medal in a time of 52.67. She then swam the anchor leg of the mixed 4×100 m freestyle relay, splitting 52.03. Australia won the gold medal in a world record time of 3:19.38. She concluded the championships with a silver medal in the 4×100 m medley relay.

In August 2022, O'Callaghan competed at the 2022 Commonwealth Games in Birmingham. She won the silver medal in the 200 m freestyle in a time of 1:54.01, which placed her as the sixth-fastest swimmer in the event's history. She finished 0.12 seconds behind the gold medalist. Later in the session, she swam the third leg of the mixed 4×100 m freestyle relay, where Australia won the gold medal in a games record of 3:21.18. The following day, she competed in the women's 4×100 m freestyle relay, splitting 52.66 on the third leg. Australia won the gold medal in a time of 3:30.64. On the third day, O'Callaghan swam the third leg of the 4×200 m freestyle relay, splitting 1:54.80. Australia won the gold medal in a time of 7:39.29, which broke the world record of 7:40.33 set by China in 2021. O'Callaghan later competed in the 100 m freestyle, recording 52.63 to win her first individual gold of the competition. On the final day, she competed in two events. The first of which was the 50 m backstroke, where she won the silver in a time of 27.47. She then anchored the women's 4×100 m medley relay to the gold medal.

O'Callaghan was selected for the 2022 World Championships (25 m) in Melbourne. Her first event was the 4×100 m freestyle relay, where she led off in a time of 52.11, with Australia recording 3:25.43 to win the gold medal. This was a new world record, surpassing the Netherlands' mark of 3:26.53 from 2014. O'Callaghan competed in two events on the second day. First was the 100 m backstroke, where she finished in a time of 55.62 to win the silver medal. Later in the night, she swam the second leg of the 4 × 200 m freestyle relay, recording a split of 1:52.83. Australia won the gold medal in world record time of 7:30.87, surpassing the Netherlands' mark of 7:32.88 from 2014. The following day, O'Callaghan swam in the 4×50 m freestyle relay, recording 24.01 on the third leg. Australia won the silver medal in an overall time of 1:34.23, which was a new Oceanian record. On day four, O'Callaghan won the bronze medal in the 50 m backstroke in an Oceanian record time of 25.61. On day five, O'Callaghan swam the first leg of the 4×50 m medley relay, recording 25.49 to break the Oceanian record in the 50 m backstroke again. Australia won the gold medal in 1:42.35 to break the world record by 0.03 seconds. O'Callaghan's final swim was the 4×100 m medley relay, swimming the backstroke leg in the heats before she was replaced by Kaylee McKeown in the final. Australia went on to win the silver medal.

=== 2023 ===
O'Callaghan was selected for the 2023 World Championships in Fukuoka. Swimming the first leg of the 4×100 m freestyle relay, she split 52.08, becoming the sixth-fastest woman of all time in the 100 m freestyle. Australia won the gold medal in 3:27.96, breaking their previous world record of 3:29.69 from 2021. O'Callaghan competed in the 200 m freestyle, trailing Ariarne Titmus for the first three laps of the final. O'Callaghan took the lead during the final lap, winning the gold medal by 0.16 seconds. She went 1:52.85, breaking Federica Pellegrini's world record of 1:52.98 from 2009. O'Callaghan competed in the 4×200 m freestyle relay, splitting 1:53.66 on the first leg. Australia won the gold medal in a world record time of 7:37.50. O'Callaghan then recorded 52.16 in the 100 m freestyle to defend her world title in the event, becoming the first woman to win both the 100 and 200 m freestyle events at a single world championships. She once again anchored the mixed 4×100 m freestyle relay to a new world record, with the team recording a time of 3:18.83. On the final day of competition, O'Callaghan anchored the 4×100 m medley relay to the silver medal.

=== 2024 ===
O'Callaghan competed at the 2024 Australian Trials in Brisbane. She came second in the 100 m backstroke with a time of 57.88, becoming the fourth-fastest woman in history. Her next event was the 200 m freestyle, which served as a rematch with Titmus. They were under world record pace for the entirely of the race, separated by no more than 0.25 seconds. Titmus finished first to break the world record in 1:52.23. O'Callaghan recorded 1:52.48 for the second-fastest time in history. O'Callaghan later won the 100 m freestyle in a time of 52.33. O'Callaghan later dropped the 100 m backstroke from her Olympic program.

On the first night of swimming in Paris, O'Callaghan competed in the 4×100m freestyle relay, splitting 52.24 on the first leg. Australia won the gold medal in 3:28.92, which was an Olympic record and the second-fastest time in history. It was Australia's fourth consecutive Olympic gold medal in the event.

O'Callaghan once again went head-to-head with Titmus in the 200 m freestyle. O'Callaghan trailed the field in the early stages of the race, but took the lead in the final lap to win the gold medal. She recorded an Olympic record time 1:53.27, surpassing Titmus' mark of 1:53.50 from the Tokyo Olympics. This was Australia's first gold-silver finish in any Olympic event since 2004.

Although O'Callaghan went into the 100 m freestyle as the two-time world champion, she finished fourth in the event. The result was considered one of the biggest surprises of the Olympics.

O'Callaghan swam the first leg of the 4×200 m freestyle relay, splitting 1:53.52 to give Australia the lead. They won the gold medal in 7:38.08, which was a new Olympic record and the second-fastest time in history. O'Callaghan later swam the anchor leg of the mixed 4×100 m medley relay, contributing a split of 52.01. Australia won the bronze medal in an Oceanian record time of 3:38.76. Her final event was the women's 4×100 m medley, where she swam the anchor leg and won the silver medal.

After the Olympics, O'Callaghan made the decision to take a hiatus for the rest of the year.

=== 2025 ===
Due to her hypermobility, O'Callaghan again sustained a dislocated knee injury in January, affecting her training for several months including water-based training.

O'Callaghan competed at the 2025 World Championships in Singapore. Her first event was the 4×100m freestyle relay. She led off in 52.79 to give Australia the lead, and the team went on to win the gold medal. Notably their American rivals, who were suffering from gastroenteritis, saw their anchor, Gretchen Walsh, withdraw before the final. In the 200 m freestyle final, O'Callaghan again emphasised the second half of the race, pulling away at the 100 m mark. She won the gold medal in 1:53.48. The following day, O'Callaghan swam the anchor leg of the 4×200 m freestyle relay. She dove in with a lead of 0.39 seconds, and was matched up against Katie Ledecky. O'Callaghan split 1:53.44 to win the gold medal in 7:39.35. This marked O'Callaghan's third gold medal of the championships and 11th gold medal overall, equalling Ian Thorpe's record for the most world championship gold medals won by an Australian swimmer. O'Callaghan won the silver medal in the 100 m freestyle, finishing 0.12 behind defending world champion Marrit Steenbergen. Her final event was the 4×100 m medley relay, where she swam the anchor leg in 52.23. Australia won the silver medal in an overall time of 3:52.67.

In October, O'Callaghan competed in the 2025 World Cup. At the Carmel stop, she went 1:50.77 in the short course 200 m freestyle to become the third fastest woman in the event's history. At the Westmont stop, O'Callaghan went 1:49.77 in the same event. This broke Siobhán Haughey's world record of 1:50.31 from 2021. At the Toronto stop, O'Callaghan went 1:49.36 to break the world record again.

== Results in major championships ==
Meet	100 free	200 free	50 back	100 back	4×50 free	4×100 free	4×200 free	4×50 medley	4×100 medley	4×100 Mixed free	4×100 Mixed medley
WJC 2019	4th		4th	4th		2nd place, silver medalist(s)			5th	5th	
OG 2021						1st place, gold medalist(s)	3rd place, bronze medalist(s)		1st place, gold medalist(s)		
WC 2022	1st place, gold medalist(s)	2nd place, silver medalist(s)		DNS		1st place, gold medalist(s)	2nd place, silver medalist(s)		2nd place, silver medalist(s)	1st place, gold medalist(s)	
CG 2022	1st place, gold medalist(s)	2nd place, silver medalist(s)	2nd place, silver medalist(s)	DNS		1st place, gold medalist(s)	1st place, gold medalist(s)		1st place, gold medalist(s)	1st place, gold medalist(s)	
SCW 2022			3rd place, bronze medalist(s)	2nd place, silver medalist(s)	2nd place, silver medalist(s)	1st place, gold medalist(s)	1st place, gold medalist(s)	1st place, gold medalist(s)	2nd place, silver medalist(s)		
WC 2023	1st place, gold medalist(s)	1st place, gold medalist(s)	DNS			1st place, gold medalist(s)	1st place, gold medalist(s)		2nd place, silver medalist(s)	1st place, gold medalist(s)	
OG 2024	4th	1st place, gold medalist(s)				1st place, gold medalist(s)	1st place, gold medalist(s)		2nd place, silver medalist(s)		3rd place, bronze medalist(s)
WC 2025	2nd place, silver medalist(s)	1st place, gold medalist(s)	Q			1st place, gold medalist(s)	1st place, gold medalist(s)		2nd place, silver medalist(s)	DNS	

== Career best times ==
=== Long course metres (50 m pool) ===
As of 12 June 2024

Event	Time		Meet	Location	Date	Notes
50 m freestyle	24.49		Australian Trials	Brisbane	15 June 2024	
100 m freestyle	52.08	r	World Championships	Fukuoka	23 July 2023	
200 m freestyle	1:52.48		Australian Trials	Brisbane	12 June 2024	
400 m freestyle	4:07.21		NSW State Championships	Sydney	11 March 2023	
50 m backstroke	27.16		Australian Championships	Gold Coast	19 April 2024	
100 m backstroke	57.88		Australian Trials	Brisbane	11 June 2024	
200 m backstroke	2:08.48		Australian Championships	Adelaide	21 May 2022	
50 m butterfly	27.72		Queensland Championships	Brisbane	11 December 2023	
100 m butterfly	58.98		Queensland Championships	Brisbane	11 December 2023	
200 m butterfly	2:13.74		Queensland Championships	Brisbane	12 December 2023	

Legend: WR – World record; OC – Oceanian record; CR – Commonwealth record; NR – Australian record;
Records not set in finals: h – heat; sf – semifinal; r – relay 1st leg; rh – relay heat 1st leg; b – B final; † – en route to final mark; so – swim-off; tt – time trial

=== Short course metres (25 m pool) ===
As of 11 October 2025

Event	Time	Meet	Location	Date	Notes
50 m freestyle	23.81	World Cup	Westmont	17 October 2025	
100 m freestyle	50.82	World Cup	Toronto	25 October 2025	
200 m freestyle	1:49.36	World Cup	Toronto	24 October 2025	WR
50 m backstroke	25.42	World Cup	Toronto	23 October 2025	
100 m backstroke	55.62	World Championships	Melbourne	14 December 2022	
200 m backstroke	2:05.45	Queensland Championships	Brisbane	25 September 2020	
50 m butterfly	27.87	State Teams Championships	Canberra	4 October 2019	

Legend: WR – World record; OC – Oceanian record; CR – Commonwealth record; NR – Australian record;
Records not set in finals: h – heat; sf – semifinal; r – relay 1st leg; rh – relay heat 1st leg; b – B final; † – en route to final mark; so – swim-off; tt – time trial

== World records ==
=== Long course metres ===
No.	Event	Time	Meet	Location	Date	Status	Ref
1	4×100 m mixed freestyle relay^{[a]}	3:19.38	World Championships	Budapest, Hungary	24 June 2022	Former	
2	4×200 m freestyle relay^{[b]}	7:39.29	Commonwealth Games	Birmingham, United Kingdom	31 July 2022	Former	
3	4×100 m freestyle relay^{[c]}	3:27.96	World Championships	Fukuoka, Japan	23 July 2023	Current	
4	200 m freestyle	1:52.85	World Championships	Fukuoka, Japan	26 July 2023	Former	
5	4×200 m freestyle relay^{[d]}	7:37.50	World Championships	Fukuoka, Japan	27 July 2023	Current	
6	4×100 m mixed freestyle relay^{[e]}	3:18.83	World Championships	Fukuoka, Japan	29 July 2023	Former	

Legend: OC – Oceanian record; NR – Australian record;
Records not set in finals: h – heat; sf – semifinal; r – relay 1st leg; rh – relay heat 1st leg; b – B final; † – en route to final mark; so – swim-off; tt – time trial

^{a} split 52.03 (4th leg); with Jack Cartwright (1st leg), Kyle Chalmers (2nd leg), Madison Wilson (3rd leg)
^{b} split 1:54.80 (3rd leg); with Madison Wilson (1st leg), Kiah Melverton (2nd leg), Ariarne Titmus (4th leg)
^{c} split 52.08 (1st leg); with Shayna Jack (2nd leg), Meg Harris (3rd leg), Emma McKeon (4th leg)
^{d} split 1:53.66 (1st leg); with Shayna Jack (2nd leg), Brianna Throssell (3rd leg), Ariarne Titmus (4th leg)
^{e} split 51.71 (4th leg); with Jack Cartwright (1st leg), Kyle Chalmers (2nd leg), Shayna Jack (3rd leg)

=== Short course metres ===
No.	Event	Time	Meet	Location	Date	Status	Ref
1	4×100 m freestyle relay^{[a]}	3:25.43	World Championships	Melbourne, Australia	13 December 2022	Former	
2	4×200 m freestyle relay^{[b]}	7:30.87	World Championships	Melbourne, Australia	14 December 2022	Former	
3	4×50 m medley relay^{[c]}	1:42.35	World Championships	Melbourne, Australia	17 December 2022	Current	
4	200 m freestyle	1:49.77	World Cup	Westmont, United States	18 October 2025	Former	
5	200 m freestyle	1:49.36	World Cup	Toronto, Canada	24 October 2025	Current	

^{a} split 52.19 (1st leg); with Madison Wilson (2nd leg), Meg Harris (3rd leg), Emma McKeon (4th leg)
^{b} split 1:52.83 (2nd leg), with Madison Wilson (1st leg), Leah Neale (3rd leg), Lani Pallister (4th leg)
^{c} split 25.49 (backstroke leg); with Chelsea Hodges (breaststroke leg), Emma McKeon (butterfly leg), Madison Wilson (freestyle leg)

== Olympic records ==
=== Long course metres ===
No.	Event	Time	Meet	Location	Date	Age	Status	Notes	Ref
1	4×100 m freestyle relay^{[a]}	3:28.92	2024 Summer Olympics	Paris, France	27 July 2024	20	Current		
2	200 m freestyle	1:53.27	2024 Summer Olympics	Paris, France	29 July 2024	20	Current		
3	4×200 m freestyle relay^{[b]}	7:38.08	2024 Summer Olympics	Paris, France	1 August 2024	20	Current		

Legend: WR – World record; OC – Oceanian record; NR – Australian record;
Records not set in finals: h – heat; sf – semifinal; r – relay 1st leg; rh – relay heat 1st leg; b – B final; † – en route to final mark; so – swim-off; tt – time trial

^{a} split 52.24 (1st leg); with Shayna Jack (2nd leg), Emma McKeon (3rd leg), Meg Harris (4th leg)
^{b} split 1:53.52 (1st leg) with Lani Pallister (2nd leg), Brianna Throssell (3rd leg), Ariarne Titmus (4th leg)

== Honours ==
- In the 2022 Australia Day Honours, O'Callaghan was awarded the Medal of the Order of Australia.
- Swimming Australia, Olympic Program Swimmer of the Year: 2022 and 2023
- Australian Institute of Sport Performance Awards Performance of the Year 2023

== See also ==
- List of Olympic medalists in swimming (women)
- List of multiple Olympic gold medalists at a single Games

== Notes ==
Records
Preceded by (Italy) Federica Pellegrini	Women's 200-metre freestyle world record-holder (long course); 26 July 2023 – 12 June 2024	Succeeded by (Australia) Ariarne Titmus
