= Se-Bom Lee =

Australian swimmer

Personal information
- Nationality: Australia
- Born: 12 June 2001 (age 25) New South Wales, Australia

Sport
- Sport: Swimming
- Club: Carlile Swimming Team

Se-Bom Lee (born 12 June 2001) is an Australian swimmer. He competed in the 400m individual medley at the 2020 Summer Olympics.

He swam a personal best of 4:14.16 at the 2021 Australian Olympic trials to book a place in the Tokyo Olympics.

== Personal life ==
Born in Australia, Lee is of South Korean descent.
