= South Africa at the 2026 Commonwealth Games =

- Flag of South Africa
- CG code: RSA
- CGA: South African Sports Confederation and Olympic Committee
- Website: teamsa.co.za

in Glasgow, Scotland 23 July 2026 – 2 August 2026
- Competitors: 111 in 9 sports
- Flag bearer (opening): Bridget Herselman
- Baton bearer: Shaun Williams
- Flag bearer (closing): Masala Makatu
- Medals Ranked 11th: Gold 7 Silver 11 Bronze 10 Total 28

Commonwealth Games appearances (overview)
- 1930; 1934; 1938; 1950; 1954; 1958; 1962–1990; 1994; 1998; 2002; 2006; 2010; 2014; 2018; 2022; 2026; 2030

South Africa competed at the 2026 Commonwealth Games in Glasgow, Scotland. This marked South Africa's eighth participation at the games, after making its post-apartheid debut at the 1994 Commonwealth Games. Prior to South Africa's temporary exclusion from the Commonwealth Games Federation in 1961, its last appearance was at the 1958 British Empire and Commonwealth Games.

The South African team consisted of 112 athletes (59 men and 53 women) competing in all ten sports

Bowler Bridget Herselman was the country's flagbearer during the opening ceremony. Meanwhile, wheelchair basketball athlete Shaun Williams was the baton bearer during the opening ceremony. Para athlete Masala Makatu served as the country's closing ceremony flagbearer.

Swimmer Chad le Clos became the most decorated individual athlete in Commonwealth Games history, winning his 21st medal.

== Competitors ==
The following is the list of number of competitors participating at the Games per sport/discipline.

Sport	Men	Women	Total
Athletics	20	10	30
3x3 basketball	4	4	8
Boxing	2	2	4
Cycling
1	1		
Gymnastics	1	5	6
Judo	2	2	4
Bowls	8	4	10
Netball
12	12		
Swimming	11	14	25
Weightlifting	5	4	9
Total	53	58	111

- includes two directors for mixed par bowls team

== Medallists ==
The following South African competitors won medals at the games. In the by discipline sections below, medallists' names are bolded.

Medal	Name	Sport	Event	Date	Ref.
Gold	Nathan Hendricks	Swimming	Men's 100 m freestyle S13	24 July	
Gold	Pieter Coetze	Swimming	Men's 50 m backstroke	25 July	
Gold	Pieter Coetze	Swimming	Men's 200 m backstroke	26 July	
Gold	Lara van Niekerk	Swimming	Women's 50 m breaststroke	28 July	
Gold	Pieter Coetze	Swimming	Men's 100 m backstroke	29 July	
Gold	Christian Sadie	Swimming	Men's 50 m freestyle S7	29 July	
Gold	Sinesipho Dambile	Athletics	Men's 200 metres	31 July	
Silver	Erin Gallagher	Swimming	Women's 50 m butterfly	25 July	
Silver	Aimee Canny	Swimming	Women's 100 m breaststroke	26 July	
Silver	Michael Houlie	Swimming	Men's 50 m breaststroke	27 July	
Silver	Nathan Hendricks	Swimming	Men's 50 m freestyle S13	28 July	
Silver	Danika Vyncke	Swimming	Women's 50 m freestyle S13	28 July	
Silver	Aimee Canny	Swimming	Women's 200 m individual medley	28 July	
Silver	Pieter Coetze; Michael Houlie; Erin Gallagher; Aimee Canny; Chad le Clos; Georgia Nel; Hannah Pearse; Chris Smith	Swimming	Mixed 4x100 m medley relay	28 July	
Silver	Kaylene Corbett	Swimming	Women's 200 m breaststroke	29 July	
Silver	Masala Makatu	Athletics	Men's 100 m T12	30 July	
Silver	Timothy Meuwsen	Judo	Men's 81 kg	1 August	
Silver	Kyle Rademeyer	Athletics	Men's pole vault	1 August	
Bronze	Aimee Canny; Rebecca Meder; Erin Gallagher; Olivia Nel; Georgia Nel; Jessica Thompson; Caitlin De Lange	Swimming	Women's 4x100 m freestyle relay	24 July	
Bronze	Pieter Coetze; Chad le Clos; Ruard van Renen; Guy Brooks; Kris Mihaylov	Swimming	Men's 4x100 m freestyle relay	24 July	
Bronze	Ruard van Renen	Swimming	Men's 50 m backstroke	25 July	
Bronze	Olivia Nel	Swimming	Women's 100 m backstroke	25 July	
Bronze	Erin Gallagher	Swimming	Women's 100 m butterfly	27 July	
Bronze	Ruard van Renen	Swimming	Men's 100 m backstroke	29 July	
Bronze	Aimee Canny; Rebecca Meder; Erin Gallagher; Olivia Nel; Georgia Nel; Jessica Thompson; Lara van Niekerk	Swimming	Women's 4x100 m medley relay	29 July	
Bronze	Pieter Coetze; Chad le Clos; Ruard van Renen; Guy Brooks; Michael Houlie; Chris Smith; Jarden Eaton	Swimming	Men's 4x100 m medley relay	29 July	
Bronze	Donné Breytenbach	Judo	Women's 57 kg	31 July	
Bronze	Zakithi Nene	Athletics	Men's 400 metres	1 August	

== Athletics ==
The main athletics squad was announced on 25 June 2026. The team consisted of 30 athletes, 20 men and 10 women, with 23 of them competing in the able-bodied events, and seven in the para events.

Men
Track events

Athlete	Event	Heat		Semifinal		Final	
Athlete	Event	Result	Rank	Result	Rank	Result	Rank
Jaco Smit	100 metres (T12)	11.11	1 Q	—		11.24	4
Masala Makatu	100 metres (T12)	11.05	2 q	—		11.04	2nd place, silver medalist(s)
Collen Mahlalela	100 metres (T47)	—				11.31	6
Cheswill Johnson	100 metres	10.21	15 q	10.05	4 q	10.13	8
Gift Leotlela	100 metres	—		10.02	1 Q	9.91	4
Bradley Nkoana	100 metres	10.16	10 q	DQ		Did not advance	
Mvuyo Moss	200 metres	21.02	3	Did not advance			
Sinesipho Dambile	200 metres	—		19.82	1 Q	19.96	1st place, gold medalist(s)
Mthi Mthimkulu	200 metres	20.39	4	Did not advance			
Zakithi Nene	400 metres	—		45.70	3 q	45.21	3rd place, bronze medalist(s)
Lythe Pillay	400 metres	—		45.87	4	Did not advance	
Tshepo Tshite	800 metres						
Tshepo Tshite	Mile	3:59.52	13 Q	—		3:57.43	10
Maxime Chaumeton	5000 metres	—					
Franco le Roux	110 metres hurdles	13.64	4 q	—		13.53	4
Sabelo Dhlamini	400 metres hurdles	50.68	14	Did not advance			
Gift Leotlela; Akani Simbine; Bradley Nkoana; Mvuyo Moss; Sinesipho Dambile	4x100 metres relay	—					

Field events

Athlete	Event	Semifinal		Final	
Athlete	Event	Result	Rank	Result	Rank
Cheswill Johnson	Long jump				
Kyle Rademeyer	Pole vault			5.70m	2nd place, silver medalist(s)
Aiden Smith	Shot put	19.86	7 q	20.31	4
Douw Smit	Javelin throw	80.64	3 q	82.88	5

Women
Track events

Athlete	Event	Heat		Semifinal		Final	
Athlete	Event	Result	Rank	Result	Rank	Result	Rank
Sheryl James	100 metres (T38)	13.94	8 q	—		14.08	8
Liezel Gouws	100 metres (T38)	14.24	10	—		Did not advance	
Sheryl James	200 metres (T38)						
Liezel Gouws	200 metres (T38)						
Marlie Viljoen	400 metres	52.99	4	Did not advance			
Prudence Sekgodiso	800 metres	2:03.84	4 q	2:01.57	7	Did not advance	
Karabo More	Mile	4:37.97	13 Q	—			
Tayla Kavanagh	10,000 metres						
Marione Fourie	100 metres hurdles	12.50	2 Q	—		12.66	4
Rogail Joseph	400 metres hurdles						

Field events

Athlete	Event	Semifinal		Final	
Athlete	Event	Result	Rank	Result	Rank
Liezel Gouws	Long jump (T38)				
Jo-Ané du Plessis	Javelin throw	—		56.22	6
Yane van der Merwe	Discus throw (F44)				

Mixed track events

Athlete	Event	Semifinal		Final	
Athlete	Event	Result	Rank	Result	Rank
	Mixed 4x400 metres relay				

== 3x3 basketball ==
South Africa qualified a men's and women's wheelchair 3x3 teams. Each team will consist of four athletes, for a total of eight.

Summary

Team	Event	Group stage				Semifinal	Final / BM / CM	
Team	Event	Opposition Score	Opposition Score	Opposition Score	Rank	Opposition Score	Opposition Score	Rank
South Africa	Men's wheelchair	Scotland –	Wales –	Malaysia –				
South Africa	Women's wheelchair	Canada –	Australia –	England –				

=== Men's wheelchair tournament ===
Squad

- Zakhele Shelembe
- Shane Williams
- Xola Yalezo
- Simanga Mbhele

Group B

Pos	Team	Pld	W	L	PF	PA	PD	Qualification
1	Scotland	3	3	0	54	25	+29	Semi-finals
2	South Africa	3	2	1	38	37	+1	Play-ins
3	Wales	3	1	2	36	50	−14	Play-ins
4	Malaysia	3	0	3	29	45	−16	

Source: Glasgow 2026
Rules for classification: 1) Wins; 2) Head-to-head record; 3) Points scored.

25 July 2026
11:40

Report

Scotland	15–9	South Africa
Pts: Erskine 11		Pts: Yalezo 4

SEC Centre, Glasgow

26 July 2026
17:00

Report

South Africa	16–12	Wales
Pts: Shelembe 6		Pts: Marshall-Wilson 8

SEC Centre, Glasgow

27 July 2026
18:15

Report

Malaysia	10–13	South Africa
Pts: three players 3		Pts: Williams 6

SEC Centre, Glasgow

=== Women's wheelchair tournament ===
Squad

- Aviwe Ngoni
- Michelle Moganedi
- Asive Gilifile
- Ongezwa Hagu

Group A

Pos	Team	Pld	W	L	PF	PA	PD	Qualification
1	England	3	3	0	51	20	+31	Semi-finals
2	Australia	3	2	1	38	30	+8	Quarter-finals
3	Canada	3	1	2	41	30	+11	Quarter-finals
4	South Africa	3	0	3	10	60	−50	

Source: Glasgow 2026
Rules for classification: 1) Wins; 2) Head-to-head record; 3) Points scored.

24 July 2026
14:30

Report

Canada	19–3	South Africa
Pts: Tessier 10		Pts: three players 1

SEC Centre, Glasgow

26 July 2026
14:25

Report

Australia	20–5	South Africa
Pts: Munro-Cook 10		Pts: Gilifile 3

SEC Centre, Glasgow

27 July 2026
12:20

Report

South Africa	2–21	England
Pts: Moganedi, Hagu 1		Pts: Robinson 8

SEC Centre, Glasgow

== Boxing ==
Team South Africa selected four boxers, two men and two women for the 2026 Games in Glasgow.

Athlete	Event	Round of 32	Round of 16	Quarterfinals	Semifinals	Final	
Athlete	Event	Opposition Result	Opposition Result	Opposition Result	Opposition Result	Opposition Result	Rank
Simamkele Damesi	Men's welterweight						
Masibulele Sigwela	Men's bantamweight						
Thandolwethu Mathiba	Women's flyweight						
Samukelisiwe Ncube	Women's light middleweight						

== Cycling ==
South Africa entered two cyclists, one of each sex, into the track programme in 2026. The male, Jean Spies was forced to withdraw two week before the event after breaking his leg in a crash during training.

Pursuit

Athlete	Event	Qualification		Final	
Athlete	Event	Time	Rank	Opponent Results	Rank
S’annara Grove	Women's individual pursuit				

Points race

Athlete	Event	Final	
Athlete	Event	Points	Rank
S’annara Grove	Women's points race		

Scratch race

Athlete	Event	Qualification	Final
S’annara Grove	Women's scratch race		13

Elimination race

Athlete	Event	Time	Rank
S’annara Grove	Women's elimination		

Keirin

Athlete	Event	1st Round	Repechage	Semifinals	Final
Athlete	Event	Rank	Rank	Rank	Rank
Mitchell Sparrow	Men's keirin	5	3	Did not advance	

== Artistic gmnastics ==
South Africa entered six gymnasts, one man and five women.

Men
Individual Qualification

Athlete	Event	Apparatus						Total	Rank
Athlete	Event	FL	PH	SR	VT	PB	HB	Total	Rank
Daniel McLean	All-around	13.350 Q	10.700	9.550	12.200	7.850	9.950	63.600	25

Individual Finals

Athlete	Event	Score	Rank
Daniel McLean	Floor	12.933	5

Women
Team Final & Individual Qualification

Athlete	Event	Apparatus				Total	Rank
Athlete	Event	VT	UB	BB	FL	Total	Rank
Caitlin Rooskrantz	Team	12.300	12.450	11.350	11.600	47.700	14 Q
Naveen Daries	Team	12.800	12.050	12.350	10.950	48.150	12 Q
Zelme Daries	Team	~~11.500~~	11.850	11.700	11.800	46.850	17 NR
Buhle Nhleko	Team	—N/a	—N/a	—N/a	—N/a	—N/a	
Karma Visagie	Team	11.550	~~11.650~~	~~11.350~~	~~9.650~~	44.200	25
Total	Team	36.650	36.350	35.400	34.350	142.750	5

Individual Finals

Athlete	Event	Apparatus				Total	Rank
Athlete	Event	VT	UB	BB	FL	Total	Rank
Caitlin Rooskrantz	All-around	—N/a	—N/a	—N/a	—N/a	DNS	
Naveen Daries	All-around	12.800	12.600	12.300	11.400	49.100	10
Zelme Daries	All-around	12.700	12.600	10.750	12.200	48.250	13

== Judo ==
South Africa selected four judoka, two of each sex, for the Games.

Men

Athlete	Event	Round of 32	Round of 16	Quarterfinals	Semifinals	Repechage	Final/BM	
Athlete	Event	Opposition Result	Opposition Result	Opposition Result	Opposition Result	Opposition Result	Opposition Result	Rank
Timothy Meuwsen	Men's 81kg							2nd place, silver medalist(s)
Thomas Breytenbach	Men's 90kg							
Donné Breytenbach	Women's 57kg							3rd place, bronze medalist(s)
Skye Knoester	Women's 63kg							

== Bowls ==
South Africa selected a team of ten bowlers, including four para bowlers, for the competition in Glasgow.

Men

Athlete	Event	Group Stage					Quarterfinal	Semifinal	Final / BM	
Athlete	Event	Opposition Score	Opposition Score	Opposition Score	Opposition Score	Rank	Opposition Score	Opposition Score	Opposition Score	Rank
Wayne Rittmuller	Singles									
Jason Evans Paul Anthony	Pairs									

Athlete	Event	Group Stage					Quarterfinal	Semifinal	Final / BM	
Athlete	Event	Opposition Score	Opposition Score	Opposition Score	Opposition Score	Rank	Opposition Score	Opposition Score	Opposition Score	Rank
Bridget Calitz	Singles									
Jacquelyn Janse Van Rensburg Elinah Muvhango	Pairs									

Para-sport

Athlete	Event	Group Stage						Semifinal	Final / BM	
Athlete	Event	Opposition Score	Opposition Score	Opposition Score	Opposition Score	Opposition Score	Rank	Opposition Score	Opposition Score	Rank
Gareth Rees-Gibbs Jarid James	Men's pairs B6–8									
Nozipho Schroeder Keith Orrell	Mixed pairs B2-3									

- Squad includes Graham Ward, Trevor Freeman (directors VI Mixed)

== Netball ==
South Africa qualified as one of the top 11 eligible teams in the World Netball Rankings as of September 1, 2025.

Summary

Team	Event	Group stage						Semifinal	Final / BM / Cl.	
Team	Event	Opposition Result	Opposition Result	Opposition Result	Opposition Result	Opposition Result	Rank	Opposition Result	Opposition Result	Rank
South Africa	Women's tournament	Malawi; W 65–44	Tonga; W 96–42	Northern Ireland; W 78–30	Australia; L 47–57	England; L 54–58				

Squad

SACSOC announced the following squad for the Glasgow 2026 netball tournament.

- Khanyisa Chawane
- Kamogelo Maseko
- Tarle Mathe
- Owethu Ngubane
- Refiloe Nketsa
- Nicola Smith
- Rolene Streutker
- Elmere van der Berg
- Karla Pretorius
- Jamie van Wyk
- Karla Victor
- Sanmarie Visser

Group stage

Pos	Team	Pld	W	D	L	GF	GA	GD	Pts	Qualification
1	Australia	5	5	0	0	378	191	+187	10	Semi-finals
2	England	5	4	0	1	355	224	+131	8	Semi-finals
3	South Africa	5	3	0	2	340	231	+109	6	Classification matches
4	Malawi	5	2	0	3	233	303	−70	4	Classification matches
5	Tonga	5	1	0	4	219	396	−177	2	Classification matches
6	Northern Ireland	5	0	0	5	191	371	−180	0	Classification matches

Source: Glasgow 2026

25 July 2026; 21:00	Report	South Africa	65–44	Malawi	OVO Hydro; Umpires: Alison Harrison, Georgina Sulley-Beales; Reserve umpire: Angela Armstrong-Lush
25 July 2026; 21:00	Report	Scoring by quarter: 18–12, 16–11, 15–9, 16–12			OVO Hydro; Umpires: Alison Harrison, Georgina Sulley-Beales; Reserve umpire: Angela Armstrong-Lush
25 July 2026; 21:00	Report	Elmeré van der Berg 48/52 (92%); Kamogelo Maseko 17/18 (94%)		Tendai Masamba 19/23 (83%); Ethel Ng'ambi 14/14 (100%); Mwai Kumwenda 9/9 (100%); Stellah Matelezi 2/3 (67%)	OVO Hydro; Umpires: Alison Harrison, Georgina Sulley-Beales; Reserve umpire: Angela Armstrong-Lush

26 July 2026; 16:00	Report	South Africa	96–42	Tonga	OVO Hydro; Umpires: Justin Barnes, Gareth Fowler; Reserve umpire: Alison Harrison
26 July 2026; 16:00	Report	Scoring by quarter: 26–15, 25–8, 21–12, 24–7			OVO Hydro; Umpires: Justin Barnes, Gareth Fowler; Reserve umpire: Alison Harrison
26 July 2026; 16:00	Report	Rolene Streutker 51/58 (88%); Owethu Ngubane 34/40 (85%); Kamogelo Maseko 11/12 (92%)		Uneeq Palavi 29/32 (91%); Marie Payn 6/7 (86%); Sovika Pousini 6/8 (75%); Lavinia Lavea 1/2 (50%)	OVO Hydro; Umpires: Justin Barnes, Gareth Fowler; Reserve umpire: Alison Harrison

28 July 2026; 14:00	Report	South Africa	78–30	Northern Ireland	OVO Hydro; Umpires: Georgina Sulley-Beales, Kate Mann; Reserve umpire: Ken Metekingi
28 July 2026; 14:00	Report	Scoring by quarter: 14–8, 18–10, 21–4, 25–8			OVO Hydro; Umpires: Georgina Sulley-Beales, Kate Mann; Reserve umpire: Ken Metekingi
28 July 2026; 14:00	Report	Elmeré van der Berg 39/42 (93%); Rolene Streutker 25/28 (89%); Kamogelo Maseko 11/11 (100%); Sammy Ngubane 3/4 (75%)		Lisa Bowman 17/24 (71%); Orlaith Rogers 8/10 (80%); Emma Magee 5/8 (63%)	OVO Hydro; Umpires: Georgina Sulley-Beales, Kate Mann; Reserve umpire: Ken Metekingi

29 July 2026; 21:00	Report	Australia	57–47	South Africa	OVO Hydro; Umpires: Tania Fink, Louise Travis; Reserve umpire: Gareth Fowler
29 July 2026; 21:00	Report	Scoring by quarter: 14–13, 18–8, 13–14, 12–12			OVO Hydro; Umpires: Tania Fink, Louise Travis; Reserve umpire: Gareth Fowler
29 July 2026; 21:00	Report	Sophie Garbin 33/34 (97%); Kiera Austin 15/23 (65%); Cara Koenen 6/7 (86%); Sophie Dwyer 3/4 (75%)		Elmeré van der Berg 39/44 (89%); Kamogelo Maseko 4/4 (100%); Sammy Ngubane 4/6 (67%)	OVO Hydro; Umpires: Tania Fink, Louise Travis; Reserve umpire: Gareth Fowler

30 July 2026; 21:00	Report	England	58–54	South Africa	OVO Hydro; Umpires: Bronwen Adams, Georgina Sulley-Beales; Reserve umpire: Kristie Simpson
30 July 2026; 21:00	Report	Scoring by quarter: 11–17, 17–12, 15–10, 15–15			OVO Hydro; Umpires: Bronwen Adams, Georgina Sulley-Beales; Reserve umpire: Kristie Simpson
30 July 2026; 21:00	Report	Olivia Tchine 41/43 (95%); Lois Pearson 17/17 (100%)		Elmere van der Berg 48/53 (91%); Sammy Ngubane 6/7 (86%)	OVO Hydro; Umpires: Bronwen Adams, Georgina Sulley-Beales; Reserve umpire: Kristie Simpson

== Swimming ==
South Africa announced a squad of 25 swimmers, 14 women and 11 men, including three para-swimmers (1 man, two women) for the 2026 Games.

Men

Athlete	Event	Heat		Semifinal		Final	
Athlete	Event	Time	Rank	Time	Rank	Time	Rank
Pieter Coetze	50 m backstroke	24.45 GR	1 Q	24.29 GR	1 Q	24.18 GR	1st place, gold medalist(s)
Pieter Coetze	100 m backstroke	54.12	3 Q	52.20 GR	1 Q	51.77 GR AF	1st place, gold medalist(s)
Pieter Coetze	200 m backstroke	1:58.48	2 Q	—		1:54.22 GR	1st place, gold medalist(s)
Pieter Coetze	100 m freestyle	DNS		—		Did not advance	
Ruard van Renen	50 m backstroke	24.78	2 Q	24.56	2 Q	24.51	3rd place, bronze medalist(s)
Ruard van Renen	100 m backstroke	54.14	4 Q	53.41	3 Q	53.31	3rd place, bronze medalist(s)
Ruard van Renen	100 m butterfly	52.14	5 Q	DNS		Did not advance	
Michael Houlie	50 m breaststroke	26.53	1 Q	26.61	1 Q	26.77	2nd place, silver medalist(s)
Michael Houlie	100 m breaststroke	1:00.14	4 Q	1:00.03	5 Q	1:00.35	7
Michael Houlie	50 m freestyle	23.28	20	—		Did not advance	
Chris Smith	50 m breaststroke	27.17	4 Q	27.01	4 Q	26.95	4
Chris Smith	100 m breaststroke	1:00.86	8 Q	1:00.43	8 Q	1:00.79	8
Calvyn Justus	50 m butterfly	23.44	3 Q	23.49	5 Q	23.53	7
Calvyn Justus	50 m freestyle	22.00	4 Q	21.86	4 Q	22.17	5
Chad le Clos	50 m butterfly	23.92	11 Q	23.65	11	Did not advance	
Chad le Clos	100 m butterfly	52.53	7 Q	52.35	8 Q	51.49	5
Jarden Eaton	50 m butterfly	24.19	15 Q	23.99	14	Did not advance	
Jarden Eaton	100 m butterfly	52.84	11 Q	52.84	11	Did not advance	
Jarden Eaton	200 m butterfly	2:07.09	14	—N/a		Did not advance	
Guy Brooks	50 m freestyle	22.99	15 Q	22.62	13	Did not advance	
Guy Brooks	100 m freestyle	49.86	15 Q	49.29	12	Did not advance	
Guy Brooks	200 m freestyle	2:01.94	33	—N/a		Did not advance	
Kris Mihaylov	200 m butterfly	1:58.12	4 Q	—N/a		1:58.02	6
Kris Mihaylov	200 m freestyle	1:50.01	16	—N/a		Did not advance	
Kris Mihaylov	400 m freestyle	4:01.09	18	—N/a		Did not advance	
Kris Mihaylov	200 m individual medley	2:03.57	11	—N/a		Did not advance	
Christian Sadie	100 m backstroke S9	1:15.32	7 Q	—N/a		1:15.82	7
Christian Sadie	50 m freestyle S7	28.45 GR	1 Q	—		28.06 GR	1st place, gold medalist(s)
Nathan Hendricks	50 m freestyle S13	25.38	3 Q	—		24.84	2nd place, silver medalist(s)
Nathan Hendricks	100 m freestyle S13	56.66	2 Q	—		54.54	1st place, gold medalist(s)
Kris Mihaylov^{[a]} Guy Brooks^{[a]} Ruard van Renen^{[a]} Chad le Clos^{[a]} Pieter Coetze; Guy Brooks; Ruard van Renen; Chad le Clos	4 x 100 m freestyle relay	3:18.14	4 Q	—		3:13.99	3rd place, bronze medalist(s)
Chris Smith^{[a]} Jarden Eaton^{[a]} Guy Brooks^{[a]} Pieter Coetze; Michael Houlie; Chad le Clos; Ruard van Renen	4 x 100 m medley relay	3:38.98	3 Q	—		3:31.13 GR AF	3rd place, bronze medalist(s)

Women

Athlete	Event	Heat		Semifinal		Final	
Athlete	Event	Time	Rank	Time	Rank	Time	Rank
Aimee Canny	100 m breaststroke	1:06.68	2 Q	1:06.04	2 Q	1:06.19	2nd place, silver medalist(s)
Aimee Canny	200 m breaststroke	2:27.05	3 Q	—		2:25.05	5
Aimee Canny	200 m individual medley	2:10.99	2 Q	—		2:09.37	2nd place, silver medalist(s)
Rebecca Meder	50 m breaststroke	31.67	9 Q	31.53	8 Q	31.81	8
Rebecca Meder	100 m breaststroke	1:07.93	7 Q	1:07.53	7 Q	1:07.68	7
Rebecca Meder	200 m breaststroke	2:29.96	8 Q	—		2:30.25	8
Rebecca Meder	200 m individual medley	2:12.58	7 Q	—		2:11.23	7
Erin Gallagher	50 m butterfly	25.70	2 Q	25.69	2 Q	25.57	2nd place, silver medalist(s)
Erin Gallagher	100 m butterfly	58.77	6 Q	57.94	5 Q	57.39	3rd place, bronze medalist(s)
Jessica Thompson	50 m backstroke	28.56	7 Q	28.54	9	Did not advance	
Jessica Thompson	100 m backstroke	1:01.54	11 Q	DNS		Did not advance	
Jessica Thompson	50 m butterfly	26.24	3 Q	26.02	4 Q	25.92	4
Jessica Thompson	50 m freestyle	25.39	9 Q	24.92	5 Q	25.06	6
Kaylene Corbett	50 m breaststroke	31.54	8 Q	31.60	9	Did not advance	
Kaylene Corbett	100 m breaststroke	1:07.37	6 Q	1:07.31	5 Q	1:07.61	6
Kaylene Corbett	200 m breaststroke	2:27.32	4 Q	—		2:24.46	2nd place, silver medalist(s)
Lara van Niekerk	50 m breaststroke	30.23	1 Q	30.63	2 Q	30.43	1st place, gold medalist(s)
Hannah Pearse	50 m backstroke	30.12	21	—N/a		Did not advance	
Hannah Pearse	100 m backstroke	1:03.23	19	—N/a		Did not advance	
Hannah Pearse	200 m backstroke	2:12.37	9	—N/a		Did not advance	
Caitlin de Lange	50 m butterfly	26.34	4 Q	26.28	5 Q	26.33	6
Caitlin de Lange	50 m freestyle	25.05	5 Q	24.82	4 Q	24.98	5
Caitlin de Lange	100 m freestyle	55.74	14 Q	55.03	8 Q	55.52	8
Hannah Robertson	200 m freestyle	2:03.31	16	—N/a		Did not advance	
Hannah Robertson	400 m freestyle	4:19.58	18	—N/a		Did not advance	
Georgia Nel	200 m freestyle	2:02.76	15	—N/a		Did not advance	
Duné Coetzee	200 m freestyle	2:00.90	11	—N/a		Did not advance	
Duné Coetzee	400 m freestyle	4:14.93	12	—N/a		Did not advance	
Duné Coetzee	800 m freestyle	8:44.23	9	—N/a		Did not advance	
Duné Coetzee	100 m butterfly	1:01.02	13 Q	1:00.70	12	Did not advance	
Duné Coetzee	200 m butterfly	2:18.85	9	—N/a		Did not advance	
Olivia Nel	50 m backstroke	28.22	6 Q	28.12	4 Q	27.95	5
Olivia Nel	100 m backstroke	1:00.59	4 Q	1:00.48	5 Q	1:00.09	3rd place, bronze medalist(s)
Olivia Nel	50 m freestyle	25.24	8 Q	DNS		Did not advance	
Olivia Nel	100 m freestyle	55.32	11 Q	DNS		Did not advance	
Danika Vyncke	50 m freestyle S13	28.78	2 Q	—		28.41	2nd place, silver medalist(s)
Danika Vyncke	100 m freestyle S13	1:05.13	3 Q	—		1:04.68	4
Alani Ferreira	50 m freestyle S13	31.44	9	—		Did not advance	
Alani Ferreira	100 m freestyle S13	1:06.95	8 Q	—		1:06.05	8
Georgia Nel^{[a]} Rebecca Meder^{[a]} Jessica Thompson^{[a]} Caitlin de Lange^{[a]} Aimee Canny; Rebecca Meder; Erin Gallagher; Olivia Nel	4 x 100 m freestyle relay	3:43.87	5 Q	—		3:38.67 AF	3rd place, bronze medalist(s)
Duné Coetzee; Georgia Nel; Hannah Robertson; Hannah Pearse	4 x 200 m freestyle relay	—		—		8:09.16	6
Jessica Thompson^{[a]} Lara van Niekerk^{[a]} Georgia Nel^{[a]} Olivia Nel; Aimee Canny; Erin Gallagher; Rebecca Meder	4 x 100 m medley relay	4:08.34	6 Q	—		3:58.58 AF	3rd place, bronze medalist(s)

Mixed

Athlete	Event	Heat		Final	
Athlete	Event	Time	Rank	Time	Rank
	Mixed 4 x 100 m freestyle relay	DNS		Did not advance	
Hannah Pearse^{[a]} Chris Smith^{[a]} Chad le Clos^{[a]} Georgia Nel^{[a]} Pieter Coetze; Michael Houlie; Erin Gallagher; Aimee Canny	Mixed 4 x 100 m medley relay	3:52.97	5 Q	3:42.61 AF	2nd place, silver medalist(s)

^{a} Athletes who participated in the heats only.

== Weightlifting ==
South Africa qualified six weightlifters (three per gender). South Africa would later get three reallocated quota spots, for a total of five men and four women (nine athletes).

Athlete	Event	Snatch (kg)		Clean & Jerk (kg)		Total (kg)	Rank
Athlete	Event	Result	Rank	Result	Rank	Total (kg)	Rank
Zachary-Paul Snyman	Men's 65 kg						
Jon-Antohein Philllips	Men's 79 kg						
William Swart	Men's 88 kg						
Nicolaas du Plooy	Men's 94 kg						
Christoffel Reeders	Men's +110 kg	140	8	163	8	303	8
Johanni Taljaard	Women's 54 kg	78	4	97	4	175	4
Anneke Spies-Burger	Women's 58 kg	77	8	101	7	178	7
Laryne Jefferies	Women's 69kg	90	8	106	8	196	8
Cheyenne Smith	women's 86 kg	86	8	100	10	186	10
