= Swimming at the 2026 Commonwealth Games – Men's 100 metre backstroke =

Men's 100 metre backstroke at the 2026 Commonwealth Games
- Venue: Tollcross International Swimming Centre
- Dates: 28 July (heats, semifinals); 29 July (final)
- Winning time: 51.77 GR, AF, CR

Medalists
gold medal	Pieter Coetze	South Africa
silver medal	Oliver Morgan	England
bronze medal	Ruard van Renen	South Africa

The men's 100 metre backstroke event at the 2026 Commonwealth Games was held on 28 and 29 July at the Tollcross International Swimming Centre.

== Records ==
Prior to this competition, the existing world, Commonwealth and Games records were as follows:

Records before the 2026 Commonwealth Games
Record	Time	Athlete (nation)	Meet	Location	Date	Ref
World record	51.60	Thomas Ceccon (ITA)	2022 World Championships	Budapest, Hungary	20 June 2022	
Commonwealth record	51.85	Pieter Coetze (RSA)	2025 World Championships	Kallang, Singapore	29 July 2025	
Games record	53.12	Chris Walker-Hebborn (ENG)	2014 Commonwealth Games	Glasgow, Scotland	25 July 2014	

== Schedule ==
The schedule is as follows:

All times are British Summer Time (UTC+1)

Date	Time	Round
Tuesday 28 July 2026	10:30	Heats
Tuesday 28 July 2026	19:00	Semifinals
Wednesday 29 July 2026	19:00	Final

== Results ==
=== Heats ===
The heats will be held on the morning of 28 July 2026.

Heat results
Rank	Heat	Lane	Swimmer	Nation	Time	Notes
1	3	4	Oliver Morgan	England	53.65	Q
2	2	4	Matthew Ward	Scotland	54.04	Q
3	4	4	Pieter Coetze	South Africa	54.12	Q
4	3	3	Ruard van Renen	South Africa	54.14	Q
5	4	5	Henry Allan	Australia	54.15	Q
6	3	5	Jack Skerry	England	54.33	Q
7	4	3	Isaac Cooper	Australia	54.36	Q
8	2	5	Cameron Brooker	England	54.67	Q
9	2	3	Jack Harvey	Bermuda	54.75	Q
10	3	6	Jamie Ferguson	Scotland	55.33	Q
11	4	2	Patrick Johnston	Northern Ireland	55.42	Q
12	2	6	Benjamin Winterborn	Canada	55.55	Q
13	4	6	Srihari Nataraj	India	55.58	Q
14	3	2	Jack Knight	Wales	56.56	Q
15	2	7	Zackary Gresham	Grenada	57.94	Q
16	3	7	Isaac Thompson	Jersey	58.02	Q
17	2	2	Luke Higgo	Cayman Islands	58.17	R
18	1	2	Joel Ling	Brunei	59.12	R
19	4	1	Oscar Dodds	Jersey	59.57	
20	2	1	Charles Foster	Isle of Man	59.72	
21	3	1	Harry Robinson	Isle of Man	1:00.50	
22	2	8	Will Sellars	Cayman Islands	1:00.53	
23	3	8	Carter Makira	Cook Islands	1:00.54	
24	1	4	Henry Bolton	Guernsey	1:02.65	
25	4	8	Matthew Ballah	Saint Vincent and the Grenadines	1:02.71	
26	1	5	Zachary Maiden	Guernsey	1:03.59	
27	1	6	Mohamed Rihan Shiham	Maldives	1:05.75	
28	1	7	Iwan Chang Lai Seng	Seychelles	1:07.35	
29	1	3	Jayden Ntwali	Rwanda	1:12.83	
	4	7	Benjamin Loewen	Canada		DNS

=== Semifinals ===
The semifinals took place during of the evening of 28 July 2026.

Semifinal results
Rank	Heat	Lane	Swimmer	Nation	Time	Notes
1	2	5	Pieter Coetze	South Africa	52.20	Q, GR
2	2	4	Oliver Morgan	England	53.09	Q
3	1	5	Ruard van Renen	South Africa	53.41	Q
4	1	3	Jack Skerry	England	53.58	Q
5	1	4	Matthew Ward	Scotland	53.59	Q
6	1	6	Cameron Brooker	England	53.73	Q
7	2	3	Henry Allan	Australia	53.93	Q
8	2	6	Isaac Cooper	Australia	54.58	Q
9	2	2	Jack Harvey	Bermuda	55.04	R
10	1	2	Jamie Ferguson	Scotland	55.29	R
11	1	7	Benjamin Winterborn	Canada	55.39	
12	2	1	Srihari Nataraj	India	55.52	
13	2	7	Patrick Johnston	Northern Ireland	55.68	
14	1	1	Jack Knight	Wales	56.42	
15	1	8	Isaac Thompson	Jersey	58.28	
16	2	8	Zackary Gresham	Grenada	58.54	

=== Final ===
The final took place during of the evening of 29 July 2026.

Final results
Rank	Lane	Swimmer	Nation	Time	Notes
1st place, gold medalist(s)	4	Pieter Coetze	South Africa	51.77	GR, AF, CR
2nd place, silver medalist(s)	5	Oliver Morgan	England	52.66	
3rd place, bronze medalist(s)	3	Ruard van Renen	South Africa	53.31	
4	6	Jack Skerry	England	53.43	
5	1	Henry Allan	Australia	53.51	
6	2	Matthew Ward	Scotland	53.62	
7	7	Cameron Brooker	England	53.73	
8	8	Jamie Ferguson	Scotland	55.88	
