= Bahamas at the 2026 Commonwealth Games =

- Flag of Bahamas
- CG code: BAH
- CGA: Bahamas Olympic Committee
- Website: bahamasolympiccommittee.org

in Glasgow, Scotland 23 July 2026 – 2 August 2026
- Competitors: 20 in 4 sports
- Flag bearer: Zaylie-Elizabeth Thompson
- Baton bearer: Rashield Williams
- Medals Ranked =20th: Gold 1 Silver 0 Bronze 1 Total 2

Commonwealth Games appearances (overview)
- 1954; 1958; 1962; 1966; 1970; 1974; 1978; 1982; 1986; 1990; 1994; 1998; 2002; 2006; 2010; 2014; 2018; 2022; 2026; 2030

The Bahamas competed at the 2026 Commonwealth Games in Glasgow, Scotland. This marked The Bahamas' 17th participation at the games, after making its debut at the 1954 Commonwealth Games.

The Bahamas team consisted of 20 athletes competing in four sports.

Swimmer Zaylie-Elizabeth Thompson was the country's flagbearer during the opening ceremony. Meanwhile, boxer Rashield Williams was the baton bearer during the opening ceremony.

== Competitors ==
The following is the list of number of competitors participating at the Games per sport/discipline.

Sport	Men	Women	Total
Athletics	5	5	10
Boxing	2	0	2
Judo	1	1	2
Swimming	3	3	6
Total	11	9	20

== Medallists ==
The following Bahamian competitors won medals at the games. In the by discipline sections below, medallists' names are bolded.

Medal	Name(s)	Sport	Event	Date	Ref.
Gold	Devynne Charlton	Athletics	Women's 100 m hurdles	30 July	
Bronze	Karra Hanna	Judo	Women's +78 kg	2 August	

== Athletics ==
The Bahamas received a quota of ten athletes (five per gender).

Track events

Athlete	Event	Heat		Semifinal		Final	
Athlete	Event	Result	Rank	Result	Rank	Result	Rank
Steven Gardiner	Men's 200 metres	20.85	2	Did not advance			
Oscar Smith	Men's 110 metres hurdles	DNF		—N/a		Did not advance	
Anthonique Strachan	Women's 200 metres	SB	3 **q**	23.66	5	Did not advance	
**Devynne Charlton**	Women's 100 metres hurdles	12.39	1 **Q**	—N/a		12.33	1st place, gold medalist(s)
Charisma Taylor	Women's 100 metres hurdles	DNS		—N/a		Did not advance	

Field events

Athlete	Event	Heat		Final	
Athlete	Event	Result	Rank	Result	Rank
Keyshawn Strachan	Men's javelin throw	78.60	8 **q**	70.39	12
Donald Thomas	Men's high jump	—N/a		2.10	6
Rhema Otabor	Women's javelin throw	—N/a		57.35	5
Anthaya Charlton	Women's long jump	6.22	13	Did not advance	

Combined events: Decathlon

Athlete	Event	100 m	LJ	SP	HJ	400 m	110H	DT	PV	JT	1500 m	Final	Rank
Kendrick Thompson	Result	DNS										DNS	DNS
Kendrick Thompson	Points	DNS										DNS	DNS

== Boxing ==
The Bahamas entered two boxers.

Men

Athlete	Event	Round of 32	Round of 16	Quarterfinals	Semifinals	Final	
Athlete	Event	Opposition Result	Opposition Result	Opposition Result	Opposition Result	Opposition Result	Rank
Rashield Williams	65 kg	Paul (PNG); **L** 2–3	Did not advance				
Carl Hield	70 kg	Bye	Talaka (SOL); **W** 3–1	McConnell (NIR); **L** WO	Did not advance		

== Judo ==
The Bahamas entered two judoka, one of each gender. Karra Hanna's medal was the country's first ever Commonwealth Games medal in the sport of judo.

Athlete	Event	Round of 32	Round of 16	Quarterfinals	Semifinals	Repechage	Final/BM	
Athlete	Event	Opposition Result	Opposition Result	Opposition Result	Opposition Result	Opposition Result	Opposition Result	Rank
Xavion Johnson	Men's 73 kg	Bye	Aremu (NGR); **W** 101–000s1	Paul (ENG); **L** 000s1–100s1	Did not advance	Short (SCO); **L** 000–100	Did not advance	7
**Karra Hanna**	Women's +78 kg	—N/a	Bye	Koro (TOG); **W** 100–000	Soppi Mbella (CMR); **L** 000s1–101	Bye	Durhone (MRI); **W** 100–000s2	3rd place, bronze medalist(s)

== Swimming ==
The Bahamas entered six swimmers.

Athlete	Event	Heat		Semifinal		Final	
Athlete	Event	Time	Rank	Time	Rank	Time	Rank
Emmanuel Gadson	Men's 100 m breaststroke	1:05.66	29	Did not advance			
Emmanuel Gadson	Men's 200 m breaststroke	2:20.56	10 **R**	—N/a		Did not advance	
Emmanuel Gadson	Men's 100 m butterfly	56.55	28	Did not advance			
Marvin Johnson	Men's 50 m freestyle	23.02	16 **Q**	22.86	16	Did not advance	
Marvin Johnson	Men's 100 m freestyle	50.54	22	Did not advance			
Marvin Johnson	Men's 50 m butterfly	25.44	39	Did not advance			
Marvin Johnson	Men's 100 m butterfly	55.15	18 **R**	Did not advance			
Lamar Taylor	Men's 50 m freestyle	22.20	7 **Q**	22.30	9 **R**	Did not advance	
Lamar Taylor	Men's 100 m freestyle	49.33	=7	49.04	9 **R**	Did not advance	
Lamar Taylor	Men's 50 m backstroke	25.91	16 **Q**	25.35	12	Did not advance	
Joanna Evans	Women's 100 m freestyle	55.53	13 **Q**	56.13	15	Did not advance	
Joanna Evans	Women's 200 m freestyle	1:59.81	9 **R**	—N/a		Did not advance	
Joanna Evans	Women's 400 m freestyle	4:17.20	14	—N/a		Did not advance	
Zaylie-Elizabeth Thompson	Women's 50 m freestyle	26.95	27	Did not advance			
Zaylie-Elizabeth Thompson	Women's 50 m breaststroke	33.60	18 **R**	Did not advance			
Zaylie-Elizabeth Thompson	Women's 100 m breaststroke	1:15.48	22	Did not advance			
Elyse Wood	Women's 50 m freestyle	26.60	25	Did not advance			
Elyse Wood	Women's 100 m freestyle	56.85	23	Did not advance			
Elyse Wood	Women's 50 m butterfly	28.60	28	Did not advance			
Elyse Wood	Women's 100 m butterfly	1:05.01	23	Did not advance			
—N/a	Mixed 4 × 100 m freestyle relay	DNS		—N/a		Did not advance	
Emmanuel Gadson; Lamar Taylor; Joanna Evans; Elyse Wood	Mixed 4 × 100 m medley relay	DNS		—N/a		Did not advance	
