= Barbados at the 2026 Commonwealth Games =

- Flag of Barbados
- CG code: BAR
- CGA: Commonwealth Games Barbados
- Website: olympic.org.bb

in Glasgow, Scotland 23 July 2026 – 2 August 2026
- Competitors: 21 in 5 sports
- Flag bearer: Erin Pinder
- Baton bearer: Antwahn Boyce-Vaughan
- Medals Ranked =31st: Gold 0 Silver 1 Bronze 0 Total 1

Commonwealth Games appearances (overview)
- 1954; 1958; 1962; 1966; 1970; 1974; 1978; 1982; 1986; 1990; 1994; 1998; 2002; 2006; 2010; 2014; 2018; 2022; 2026; 2030

Barbados competed at the 2026 Commonwealth Games in Glasgow, Scotland. This marked Barbados' 18th participation at the games, after making its debut at the 1954 Commonwealth Games.

The King's Baton relay stopped in Barbados in late March and early April 2025.

The Barbados was expected to consist of 27 athletes. In July 2026 the final team of 21 athletes (11 men and 10 women) competing in five sports was officially named. Artistic gymnast Erin Pinder was the country's opening ceremony flagbearer. Meanwhile, para swimmer Antwahn Boyce-Vaughan was the baton bearer during the opening ceremony.

Barbados finished the competition with one silver medal, ranking the country tied for 31st on the medal table.

== Competitors ==
The following is the list of number of competitors participating at the Games per sport/discipline.

Sport		Men	Women	Total
Artistic gymnastics		0	1	1
Athletics		5	5	10
Judo		0	1	1
Swimming	Swimming	4	3	6
Swimming	Para-swimming	1	0	1
Weightlifting		1	0	1
Total		11	10	21

== Medallists ==
The following Barbadian competitors won medals at the games. In the by discipline sections below, medallists' names are bolded.

Medal	Name(s)	Sport	Event	Date	Ref.
Silver	Sada Williams	Athletics	Women's 400 m	1 August	

== Artistic gymnastics ==
Barbados entered one female gymnast.

Women
Individual Qualification

Athlete	Event	Apparatus				Total	Rank
Athlete	Event	VT	UB	BB	FL	Total	Rank
Erin Pinder	All-around	—N/a	10.850	—N/a			

== Athletics (track and field) ==
Barbados entered ten track athletes (five per gender).

Key

Ranks given for track events are within the athlete's heat only.

- **Q** = Qualified for the next round
- **q** = Qualified for the next round as a fastest loser or, in field events, by position without achieving the qualifying target

Men
Track events

Athlete	Event	Round one		Semifinal		Final	
Athlete	Event	Result	Rank	Result	Rank	Result	Rank
Julian Forde	100 m	10.58	4	Did not advance			
Kuron Griffith	100 m	10.24	3 **q**	10.26	8	Did not advance	
Kuron Griffith	200 m	20.75	2 **q**	20.66	5	Did not advance	
Desean Boyce	400 m	46.55	2 **q**	DNF		Did not advance	
Kyle Gale	400 m	47.41	5	Did not advance			
Rasheeme Griffith	400 m hurdles	50.08	5	—N/a		Did not advance	

Women
Track events

Athlete	Event	Round one		Semifinal		Final	
Athlete	Event	Result	Rank	Result	Rank	Result	Rank
Kishawna Niles	100 m	11.52	2 **q**	11.52 **SB**	4	Did not advance	
Kelia Bentham	200 m	23.96	5	Did not advance			
**Sada Williams**	400 m	Bye		51.85	2 **Q**	50.99	2nd place, silver medalist(s)
Adeyah Brewster	100 m hurdles	DNF		—N/a		Did not advance	
Maya Rollins	100 m hurdles	13.36	8	—N/a		Did not advance	

== Judo ==
Barbados entered one female judoka.

Women

Athlete	Event	Round of 16	Quarterfinals	Semifinals	Repechage	Final/BM	
Athlete	Event	Opposition Result	Opposition Result	Opposition Result	Opposition Result	Opposition Result	Rank
Deann Walton	57 kg	Nawila (ZAM); **L** 000–100	Did not advance				

== Swimming ==
Barbados entered seven swimmers (four men and three women). Barbados also entered one male para-swimmer.

Men

Athlete	Event	Heat		Semifinal		Final	
Athlete	Event	Time	Rank	Time	Rank	Time	Rank
Christien Kelly	50 m freestyle	24.83	50	Did not advance			
Christien Kelly	50 m butterfly	25.54	40	Did not advance			
Joshua Ross	50 m breaststroke	29.95	37	Did not advance			
Joshua Ross	100 m breaststroke	1:05.09	25	Did not advance			
Luis Weekes	50 m breaststroke	30.67	42	Did not advance			
Luis Weekes	100 m breaststroke	1:08.80	36	Did not advance			
Victor Ashby	50 m butterfly	26.27	50	Did not advance			
Victor Ashby	100 m butterfly	59.22	32	Did not advance			
Victor Ashby	200 m butterfly	2:17.94	17	—N/a		Did not advance	

Women

Athlete	Event	Heat		Semifinal		Final	
Athlete	Event	Time	Rank	Time	Rank	Time	Rank
Toria Alleyne	50 m freestyle	27.69	41	Did not advance			
Toria Alleyne	100 m freestyle	1:00.54	37	Did not advance			
Toria Alleyne	200 m freestyle	2:14.75	31	—N/a		Did not advance	
Toria Alleyne	50 m butterfly	30.13	42	Did not advance			
Adara Stoddard	50 m breaststroke	34.35	20	Did not advance			
Adara Stoddard	100 m breaststroke	1:14.67	19	Did not advance			
Adara Stoddard	200 m breaststroke	2:46.23	13	—N/a		Did not advance	
Jaiya Simmons	50 m butterfly	29.26	39	Did not advance			
Jaiya Simmons	100 m butterfly	1:04.43	20	Did not advance			
Jaiya Simmons	200 m butterfly	DNS		—N/a		Did not advance	
Jaiya Simmons	200 m individual medley	2:29.83	15	—N/a		Did not advance	

=== Para swimming ===
Athlete	Event	Heat		Final	
Athlete	Event	Time	Rank	Time	Rank
Antwahn Boyce-Vaughan	Men's 100 m backstroke S9	2:07.56	8 **Q**	2:07.22	8

== Weightlifting ==
Barbados received a bipartie quota spot for one male athlete.

Men

Athlete	Event	Snatch (kg)		Clean & Jerk (kg)		Total (kg)	Rank
Athlete	Event	Result	Rank	Result	Rank	Total (kg)	Rank
Daniel Griffith	94 kg	131	9	165	7	296	7
