= Swimming at the 2026 Commonwealth Games – Women's 50 metre freestyle =

Women's 50 metre freestyle at the 2026 Commonwealth Games
- Venue: Tollcross International Swimming Centre
- Dates: 28 July (heats, semifinals); 29 July (final)
- Competitors: 66 from 44 nations
- Winning time: 24.23

Medalists
gold medal	Meg Harris	Australia
silver medal	Shayna Jack	Australia
bronze medal	Alex Perkins	Australia

The women's 50 metre freestyle event at the 2026 Commonwealth Games was held on 28 and 29 July at the Tollcross International Swimming Centre. The event was won by Meg Harris of Australia, the leader of an Australian clean sweep of the podium. It was one of six golds won at the 2026 Games by Harris, tying the record for most won by an athlete in one edition of the Games.

== Schedule ==
The schedule was as follows:

All times are British Summer Time (UTC+1)

Date	Time	Round
Tuesday 28 July 2026	10:30	Heats
Tuesday 28 July 2026	19:00	Semifinals
Wednesday 29 July 2026	19:00	Final

== Results ==
=== Heats ===
The heats were held on the morning of 28 July 2026.

Heat results
Rank	Heat	Lane	Swimmer	Nation	Time	Notes
1	9	4	Meg Harris	Australia	24.38	Q
2	8	4	Shayna Jack	Australia	24.46	Q
3	8	5	Alex Perkins	Australia	24.96	Q
4	7	3	Chelsey Edwards	New Zealand	25.02	Q
5	9	3	Caitlin de Lange	South Africa	25.05	Q
6	9	5	Theodora Taylor	Wales	25.11	Q
7	7	5	Darcy Revitt	England	25.17	Q
8	8	3	Olivia Nel	South Africa	25.24	Q
9	9	6	Jessica Thompson	South Africa	25.39	Q
10	8	7	Anahira Mccutcheon	Fiji	25.45	Q
11	7	6	Gloria Muzito	Uganda	25.53	Q
12	9	2	Zoe Pedersen	New Zealand	25.60	Q
13	7	2	Meghan Higgs	Wales	25.61	Q
14	8	2	Grace Davison	Northern Ireland	25.70	Q
15	9	7	Emma Wood	Scotland	25.76	Q
16	7	7	Namutebi Kirabo	Uganda	25.92	Q
17	9	8	Milana Tapper	New Zealand	25.99	R
18	6	5	Halle Harris	Sierra Leone	26.01	R
19	8	1	Sara Mose	Kenya	26.07	
20	5	5	Mia Phiri	Zambia	26.32	
21	5	6	J.O.T. Humphrey	Namibia	26.33	
22	9	1	Anna Hadjiloizou	Cyprus	26.36	
23	6	3	Ella Justice	Isle of Man	26.38	
24	7	8	Emily Hughes	Northern Ireland	26.50	
25	8	8	Elyse Wood	Bahamas	26.60	
26	6	4	Tilly Collymore	Grenada	26.83	
27	5	4	Tatiana Tostevin	Guernsey	26.95	
27	6	8	Elizabeth Thompson Zaylie	Bahamas	26.95	
29	5	7	Tallulah-Mae Rautenbach	Guernsey	27.03	
30	6	7	Paige Schendelaar Kemp	Samoa	27.06	
31	6	1	Maxine Egner	Botswana	27.10	
32	6	6	Unilez Takyi	Ghana	27.13	
33	5	2	I.-B.P. Thorpe	Kenya	27.15	
34	3	4	Dorcas Oka	Nigeria	27.27	
34	5	1	Alicia Kok Shun	Mauritius	27.27	
36	5	3	Mia Laban	Cook Islands	27.31	
37	5	8	Jade Phiri	Zambia	27.49	
38	4	5	Emma Bourgaize	Guernsey	27.50	
39	4	6	Sharmeen Mohammad Mharvin	Brunei	27.63	
40	4	3	Davia Richardson	Belize	27.68	
41	4	2	Toria Alleyne	Barbados	27.69	
42	2	2	Hayley Wong	Brunei	27.73	
43	2	8	Jhnayali Tokome-Garap	Papua New Guinea	27.76	
44	3	5	Megan Hansford	Jersey	27.79	
45	4	4	Bianca Mitchell	Antigua and Barbuda	27.83	
46	3	2	Amna Thazkiyah Mirsaad	Maldives	27.99	NR
47	4	1	Loane Russet	Vanuatu	28.11	
48	4	7	Aleka Persaud	Guyana	28.13	
49	4	8	Angelina Smythe	Seychelles	28.15	
50	2	7	Roxanne Kirarock	Papua New Guinea	28.63	
51	3	3	S.T. Dlamini	Eswatini	28.65	
52	3	7	Aaliyah Palestrini	Seychelles	28.67	
53	3	8	Dorianne Bristol	Seychelles	28.69	
54	6	2	Aunjelique Liddie	Antigua and Barbuda	28.78	
55	3	6	Jasmine Schofield	Dominica	28.85	
56	2	4	Joanna Chen	Papua New Guinea	29.18	
57	1	3	Katie Green	Gibraltar	29.25	
58	1	4	Vaoahi Afu	Tonga	29.63	
59	2	5	Skyla Connor	Saint Kitts and Nevis	29.68	
60	3	1	Arleigha Hall	Turks and Caicos Islands	29.73	
61	1	6	Katie Maddocks	Gibraltar	29.97	
62	2	3	Axela Marita Echessah	Rwanda	30.31	
63	1	5	Zoe Rebello	Malawi	30.57	
64	1	2	Loise Bently	Solomon Islands	33.98	
65	2	6	Olamiday Sam	Sierra Leone	34.46	
66	2	1	Kayleigh Vanterpool	Anguilla	39.29	
	7	1	Delia Lloyd	Canada	DNS	
	7	4	Eva Okaro	England	DNS	
	8	6	Danielle Hill	Northern Ireland	DNS	

=== Semifinals ===
The semifinals took place during of the evening of 28 July 2026.

Semifinal results
Rank	Heat	Lane	Swimmer	Nation	Time	Notes
1	2	4	Meg Harris	Australia	24.18	Q
2	1	4	Shayna Jack	Australia	24.42	Q
3	2	5	Alex Perkins	Australia	24.77	Q
4	2	3	Caitlin de Lange	South Africa	24.82	Q
5	1	6	Jessica Thompson	South Africa	24.92	Q
6	1	3	Theodora Taylor	Wales	24.97	Q
7	1	5	Chelsey Edwards	New Zealand	25.00	Q
8	2	6	Darcy Revitt	England	25.34	Q
9	1	1	Emma Wood	Scotland	25.45	R
10	2	1	Grace Davison	Northern Ireland	25.48	R
11	1	7	Meghan Higgs	Wales	25.51	
12	2	2	Anahira McCutcheon	Fiji	25.53	
13	2	7	Zoe Pedersen	New Zealand	25.63	
14	1	2	Gloria Muzito	Uganda	25.70	
15	2	8	Namutebi Kirabo	Uganda	25.73	
16	1	8	Milana Tapper	New Zealand	25.85	

=== Final ===
The final took place during of the evening of 29 July 2026.

Final results
Rank	Lane	Swimmer	Nation	Time	Notes
1st place, gold medalist(s)	4	Meg Harris	Australia	24.23	
2nd place, silver medalist(s)	3	Alex Perkins	Australia	24.53	
3rd place, bronze medalist(s)	5	Shayna Jack	Australia	24.57	
4	7	Theodora Taylor	Wales	24.8	
5	6	Caitlin de Lange	South Africa	24.98	
6	2	Jessica Thompson	South Africa	25.06	
7	1	Chelsey Edwards	New Zealand	25.17	
7	8	Darcy Revitt	England	25.17	
