= Swimming at the 2026 Commonwealth Games – Women's 50 metre butterfly =

Women's 50 metre butterfly at the 2026 Commonwealth Games
- Venue: Tollcross International Swimming Centre
- Dates: 24 July (heats, semifinals); 25 July (final)
- Competitors: 52 from 38 nations
- Winning time: 25.37

Medalists
gold medal	Alexandria Perkins	Australia
silver medal	Erin Gallagher	South Africa
bronze medal	Hazel Ouwehand	New Zealand

The women's 50 metre butterfly event at the 2026 Commonwealth Games was held on 24 and 25 July at the Tollcross International Swimming Centre.

== Schedule ==
The schedule was as follows:

All times are British Summer Time (UTC+1)

Date	Time	Round
Friday 24 July 2026	11:37	Heats
Friday 24 July 2026	20:08	Semifinals
Saturday 25 July 2026	19:55	Final

== Results ==
=== Heats ===
The heats were held at 11:37 on 24 July 2026.

Heat results
Rank	Heat	Lane	Swimmer	Nation	Time	Notes
1	7	4	Alexandria Perkins	Australia	25.55	Q
2	6	4	Erin Gallagher	South Africa	25.70	Q
3	5	5	Jessica Thompson	South Africa	26.24	Q
4	6	5	Caitlin de Lange	South Africa	26.34	Q
5	5	4	Hazel Ouwehand	New Zealand	26.40	Q
6	6	3	Ciara Schlosshan	Scotland	26.50	Q
7	7	3	Zoe Pedersen	New Zealand	26.60	Q
8	7	5	Eva Okaro	England	26.67	Q
9	6	6	Lucy Grieve	Scotland	26.69	Q
10	5	3	Theodora Taylor	Wales	26.88	Q
11	7	2	Kylie Masse	Canada	27.05	Q
12	5	7	Anahira McCutcheon	Fiji	27.09	Q
13	7	6	Emma Harvey	Bermuda	27.16	Q
14	5	6	Jessica Calderbank	Jamaica	27.17	Q
15	7	7	Elizabeth Dekkers	Australia	27.26	Q
16	1	6	Elan Daley	Bermuda	27.56	Q
17	6	2	Alana Burns-Atkin	Northern Ireland	27.67	R
18	4	1	Sabrina Lyn	Jamaica	27.75	R
19	6	7	Halle Harris	Sierra Leone	27.84	
20	3	4	Jessica Humphrey	Namibia	27.97	
21	5	2	Imara-Bella Thorpe	Kenya	27.98	
22	6	8	Mia Phiri	Zambia	28.02	
23	6	1	Paige Schendelaar-Kemp	Samoa	28.08	
24	7	8	Noëlie Lacour	Gabon	28.18	
25	4	4	Orla Rabey	Guernsey	28.39	
26	5	8	Jade Phiri	Zambia	28.48	
27	7	1	Gloria Muzito	Uganda	28.55	
28	4	5	Elyse Wood	Bahamas	28.60	
29	5	1	Sierrah Broadbelt	Cayman Islands	28.72	
30	3	5	Davia Richardson	Belize	28.86	
31	4	3	Tatiana Tostevin	Guernsey	28.92	
32	1	3	Hayley Wong	Brunei	28.99	
32	4	6	Tilly Collymore	Grenada	28.99	
34	3	3	Molly Staples	Guernsey	29.10	
35	4	2	Kennice Greene	Saint Vincent and the Grenadines	29.11	
36	3	7	Namutebi Kirabo	Uganda	29.12	
37	3	2	Megan Hansford	Jersey	29.21	
38	3	6	Aleka Persaud	Guyana	29.24	
39	4	8	Jaiya Simmons	Barbados	29.26	
40	2	1	Jehanara Nabi	Pakistan	29.99	
41	4	7	Nubia Adjei	Ghana	30.02	
42	3	8	Toria Alleyne	Barbados	30.13	
43	1	4	Jhnayali Tokome-Garap	Papua New Guinea	30.26	
44	2	5	Dorianne Bristol	Seychelles	31.04	
45	2	3	Jasmine Schofield	Dominica	31.23	
46	3	1	Aunjelique Liddie	Antigua and Barbuda	31.67	
47	2	7	Joanna Chen	Papua New Guinea	31.90	
48	1	5	Roxanne Kirarock	Papua New Guinea	32.25	
49	2	4	Loane Russet	Vanuatu	32.34	
50	2	2	Axela Echessah	Rwanda	32.64	
51	2	6	Sonia Aktar	Bangladesh	32.71	
52	2	8	Zoe Rebello	Malawi	35.78	

=== Semifinals ===
The semifinals were held at 20:08 on 24 July 2026.

Semifinal results
Rank	Heat	Lane	Swimmer	Nation	Time	Notes
1	2	4	Alexandria Perkins	Australia	25.48	Q
2	1	4	Erin Gallagher	South Africa	25.69	Q
3	2	3	Hazel Ouwehand	New Zealand	26.01	Q
4	2	5	Jessica Thompson	South Africa	26.02	Q
5	1	5	Caitlin de Lange	South Africa	26.28	Q
6	2	6	Zoe Pedersen	New Zealand	26.38	Q
7	1	6	Eva Okaro	England	26.43	Q
8	2	2	Lucy Grieve	Scotland	26.46	Q
9	1	3	Ciara Schlosshan	Scotland	26.53	R
10	1	2	Theodora Taylor	Wales	26.87	R
11	2	1	Jessica Calderbank	Jamaica	26.88	
12	2	7	Anahira McCutcheon	Fiji	27.01	
13	1	7	Emma Harvey	Bermuda	27.05	
14	1	1	Elizabeth Dekkers	Australia	27.17	
15	1	8	Alana Burns-Atkin	Northern Ireland	27.52	
16	2	8	Elan Daley	Bermuda	27.74	

=== Final ===
The finals was held at 19:55 on 25 July 2026.

Final results
Rank	Lane	Swimmer	Nation	Time	Notes
1st place, gold medalist(s)	4	Alexandria Perkins	Australia	25.37	
2nd place, silver medalist(s)	5	Erin Gallagher	South Africa	25.57	
3rd place, bronze medalist(s)	3	Hazel Ouwehand	New Zealand	25.76	
4	6	Jessica Thompson	South Africa	25.92	
5	7	Zoe Pedersen	New Zealand	26.24	
6	2	Caitlin de Lange	South Africa	26.33	
7	8	Lucy Grieve	Scotland	26.42	
8	1	Eva Okaro	England	26.57	
