= Swimming at the 2026 Commonwealth Games – Women's 100 metre freestyle =

Women's 100 metre freestyle at the 2026 Commonwealth Games
- Venue: Tollcross International Swimming Centre
- Dates: 26 July (heats, semifinals); 27 July (final)
- Competitors: 70 from 43 nations
- Winning time: 52.90

Medalists
gold medal	Meg Harris	Australia
silver medal	Mollie O'Callaghan	Australia
bronze medal	Shayna Jack	Australia

The women's 100 metre freestyle event at the 2026 Commonwealth Games will be held on 26 and 27 July at the Tollcross International Swimming Centre.

== Schedule ==
The schedule is as follows:

All times are British Summer Time (UTC+1)

Date	Time	Round
Sunday 26 July 2026	10:30	Heats
Sunday 26 July 2026	19:00	Semifinals
Monday 27 July 2026	19:00	Final

== Results ==
=== Heats ===
The heats will be held on the morning of 26 July 2026.

Heat results
Rank	Heat	Lane	Swimmer	Nation	Time	Notes
1	8	4	Meg Harris	Australia	53.91	Q
2	9	4	Mollie O'Callaghan	Australia	54.37	Q
3	9	3	Theodora Taylor	Wales	54.80	Q
4	8	5	Evelyn Davis	Scotland	54.81	Q
5	9	2	Zoe Pedersen	New Zealand	55.18	Q
6	9	6	Grace Davison	Northern Ireland	55.21	Q
7	9	5	Eva Okaro	England	55.24	Q
8	7	5	Freya Anderson	England	55.25	Q
9	7	4	Shayna Jack	Australia	55.28	Q
10	7	3	Leah Schlosshan	England	55.30	Q
11	8	3	Olivia Nel	South Africa	55.32	WD
12	8	6	Emma Wood	Scotland	55.35	Q
13	6	7	Joanna Evans	Bahamas	55.53	Q
14	9	7	Caitlin de Lange	South Africa	55.74	Q
15	6	3	Anahira McCutcheon	Fiji	55.78	Q
16	9	1	Sophie Davies	Wales	55.83	Q
17	7	2	Gloria Muzito	Uganda	55.88	Q
18	8	2	Lucy Hope	Scotland	55.94	R
19	8	7	Meghan Higgs	Wales	56.27	R
20	2	7	Elan Daley	Bermuda	56.66	
21	8	8	Emily Hughes	Northern Ireland	56.71	
22	7	6	Chelsey Edwards	New Zealand	56.72	
23	9	8	Elyse Wood	Bahamas	56.85	
24	6	4	Anna Hadjiloizou	Cyprus	57.08	
25	6	5	Tilly Collymore	Grenada	57.57	
26	6	6	Sara Mose	Kenya	58.11	
27	7	7	Delia Lloyd	Canada	58.20	
28	5	3	Jessica Humphrey	Namibia	58.29	
29	6	8	Halle Harris	Sierra Leone	58.39	
30	5	2	Orla Rabey	Guernsey	58.40	
31	5	5	Nafanua Hamilton	Samoa	58.53	
32	5	1	Maxine Egner	Botswana	59.06	
33	5	6	Tatiana Tostevin	Guernsey	59.10	
34	5	7	Emma Bourgaize	Guernsey	59.64	
35	4	7	Yalindi Rupesinghe	Sri Lanka	1:00.31	
36	4	4	Jehanara Nabi	Pakistan	1:00.36	
37	4	5	Toria Alleyne	Barbados	1:00.54	
38	3	6	Angelina Smythe	Seychelles	1:00.59	
39	5	8	Bianca Mitchell	Antigua and Barbuda	1:00.66	
40	4	2	Davia Richardson	Belize	1:00.74	
41	1	7	Hayley Wong	Brunei	1:00.75	
42	4	6	Megan Hansford	Jersey	1:00.77	
43	1	5	Unilez Takyi	Ghana	1:00.94	
44	4	1	Kiera Prentice	Isle of Man	1:00.97	
45	2	2	Kennice Greene	Saint Vincent and the Grenadines	1:01.28	
46	3	4	Lauren Dennett	Isle of Man	1:01.44	
47	2	4	Aaliyah Palestrini	Seychelles	1:01.53	
48	4	3	Alicia Kok Shun	Mauritius	1:01.59	
49	3	5	Jhnayali Tokome-Garap	Papua New Guinea	1:02.37	
50	3	2	Jasmine Schofield	Dominica	1:02.71	
50	4	8	Tara Naluwoza	Uganda	1:02.71	
52	3	8	Amna Mirsaad	Maldives	1:02.74	NR
53	3	1	Siwakhile Dlamini	Eswatini	1:02.82	
54	2	5	Dorianne Bristol	Seychelles	1:03.09	
55	1	2	Joanna Chen	Papua New Guinea	1:03.13	
56	3	7	Loane Russet	Vanuatu	1:03.44	
57	2	1	Katie Green	Gibraltar	1:03.92	
57	5	4	Anjelique Liddie	Antigua and Barbuda	1:03.92	
59	1	3	Katie Maddocks	Gibraltar	1:05.53	
60	1	4	Roxanne Kirarock	Papua New Guinea	1:06.13	
61	1	6	Sonia Aktar	Bangladesh	1:07.70	
62	2	8	Axela Echessah	Rwanda	1:08.31	
63	2	3	Olamiday Sam	Sierra Leone	1:16.87	
64	2	6	Kayleigh Vanterpool	Anguilla	1:35.55	
	3	3	Aleka Persaud	Guyana	DNS	
	6	1	Kyra Rabess	Cayman Islands	DNS	
	6	2	Ella Justice	Isle of Man	DNS	
	7	1	Aimee Canny	South Africa	DNS	
	7	8	Madison Kryger	Canada	DNS	
	8	1	Victoria Catterson	Northern Ireland	DNS	

=== Semifinals ===
The semifinals will take place during of the evening of 26 July 2026.

Semifinal results
Rank	Heat	Lane	Swimmer	Nation	Time	Notes
1	1	4	Mollie O'Callaghan	Australia	53.29	Q
2	2	4	Meg Harris	Australia	53.39	Q
3	2	2	Shayna Jack	Australia	53.67	Q
4	2	5	Theodora Taylor	Wales	54.28	Q
5	1	5	Evelyn Davis	Scotland	54.33	Q
6	1	6	Freya Anderson	England	54.79	Q
7	1	2	Leah Schlosshan	England	54.82	Q
8	2	1	Caitlin de Lange	South Africa	55.03	Q
9	1	3	Grace Davison	Northern Ireland	55.12	R
10	2	6	Eva Okaro	England	55.15	R
11	2	7	Emma Wood	Scotland	55.39	
12	2	3	Zoe Pedersen	New Zealand	55.49	
13	1	1	Anahira McCutcheon	Fiji	55.80	
13	2	8	Sophie Davies	Wales	55.80	
15	1	7	Joanna Evans	Bahamas	56.13	
16	1	8	Gloria Muzito	Uganda	56.21	

=== Final ===
The final will take place during of the evening of 27 July 2026.

Final results
Rank	Lane	Swimmer	Nation	Time	Notes
1st place, gold medalist(s)	5	Meg Harris	Australia	52.90	
2nd place, silver medalist(s)	4	Mollie O'Callaghan	Australia	53.25	
3rd place, bronze medalist(s)	3	Shayna Jack	Australia	53.38	
4	6	Theodora Taylor	Wales	54.00	
5	2	Evelyn Davis	Scotland	54.40	
6	7	Freya Anderson	England	54.52	
7	1	Leah Schlosshan	England	55.02	
8	8	Caitlin de Lange	South Africa	55.52	
