= Swimming at the 2026 Commonwealth Games – Men's 50 metre breaststroke =

Men's 50 metre breaststroke at the 2026 Commonwealth Games
- Venue: Tollcross International Swimming Centre
- Dates: 26 July (heats, semifinals); 27 July (final)
- Winning time: 26.50

Medalists
gold medal	Sam Williamson	Australia
silver medal	Michael Houlie	South Africa
bronze medal	Adam Peaty	England

The men's 50 metre breaststroke event at the 2026 Commonwealth Games was held on 26 and 27 July at the Tollcross International Swimming Centre.

== Records ==
Prior to this competition, the existing world, Commonwealth and Games records were as follows:

Records before the 2026 Commonwealth Games
Record	Time	Athlete (nation)	Meet	Location	Date	Ref
World record	25.95	Adam Peaty (GBR)	2017 World Championships	Budapest, Hungary	25 July 2017	
Commonwealth record	25.95	Adam Peaty (GBR)	2017 World Championships	Budapest, Hungary	25 July 2017	
Games record	26.49	Adam Peaty (ENG)	2018 Commonwealth Games	Gold Coast, Queensland	8 April 2018	

== Schedule ==
The schedule is as follows:

All times are British Summer Time (UTC+1)

Date	Time	Round
Sunday 26 July 2026	10:30	Heats
Sunday 26 July 2026	19:00	Semifinals
Monday 27 July 2026	19:00	Final

== Results ==
=== Heats ===
The heats were held on the morning of 26 July 2026.

Heat results
Rank	Heat	Lane	Swimmer	Nation	Time	Notes
1	7	4	Michael Houlie	South Africa	26.53	Q
2	8	4	Sam Williamson	Australia	26.75	Q
3	7	5	Ronan Wantenaar	Namibia	27.13	Q
4	8	5	Chris Smith	South Africa	27.17	Q
5	6	4	Adam Peaty	England	27.27	Q
6	6	5	Filip Nowacki	Jersey	27.29	Q
7	8	3	Archie Goodburn	Scotland	27.38	Q
8	6	3	Oliver Dawson	Canada	27.47	Q
9	7	6	Adam Bradley	Northern Ireland	27.57	Q
10	6	6	Jadon Wuilliez	Antigua and Barbuda	27.69	Q
11	7	3	Max Morgan	England	27.74	Q
12	8	7	Adrian Robinson	Botswana	27.87	Q
13	8	6	Kyle Booth	Wales	28.05	Q
14	8	2	Bailey Lello	Australia	28.06	Q
15	6	2	Kito Campbell	Jamaica	28.11	Q
15	6	7	Samuel Yalimaiwai	Fiji	28.11	Q
17	6	8	Ronny Hallett	Guernsey	28.23	R
18	5	7	Alexander Turnbull	Isle of Man	28.51	R
19	8	1	Panayiotis Panaretos	Cyprus	28.55	
20	7	7	Markos Iakovidis	Cyprus	28.58	
21	7	8	Zach Moyo	Zambia	28.62	
22	8	8	Jacob Story	Cook Islands	28.63	
23	7	2	Charlie-Joe Hallett	Guernsey	28.69	
24	5	6	Alexandros Grigoriou	Cyprus	28.77	
25	7	1	Zavv Xian Le Lee	Singapore	28.80	
26	6	1	Josh Inglis	Wales	28.85	
27	5	4	Haniel Kudwoli	Kenya	28.86	
27	5	5	Matthew George Lawrence	Mozambique	28.86	
29	4	5	Hans Li Ying Pin	Mauritius	28.89	
30	5	8	Don Younger	Fiji	29.03	
31	5	2	Jose Canjulo	Namibia	29.21	
32	4	4	Christian Toia	Samoa	29.25	
33	5	1	Sumbwanyambe Shamambo	Zambia	29.26	
34	5	3	Collin McKenzie	Jamaica	29.47	
35	2	5	Hamza Asif	Pakistan	29.63	
36	4	2	Tendo Mukalazi	Uganda	29.77	
37	3	4	Joshua Ross	Barbados	29.95	
38	3	8	Alexander Joachim	Saint Vincent and the Grenadines	30.12	
39	4	6	Connor Mealin	Isle of Man	30.29	
40	4	7	Jordan Ssamula	Uganda	30.42	
41	1	4	Thomas Chen	Papua New Guinea	30.43	
42	4	3	Luis Weekes	Barbados	30.67	
43	4	8	Carter Makira	Cook Islands	30.85	
44	2	1	Sukumar Rajbongshi	Bangladesh	30.90	
45	2	3	Damien Selso de Sousa	Eswatini	31.05	
46	3	3	Zachary Bellhouse	Isle of Man	31.09	
47	3	5	Nathan Nagapin	Seychelles	31.20	
48	3	6	Looth Mohamed Hussain	Maldives	31.54	NR
49	4	1	Ivan Snowden	Ghana	31.63	
50	2	4	Chase Thompson	Guyana	32.78	
51	2	6	Lukas Robbertse	Saint Helena	34.20	
52	3	2	Ethan Gardiner	Turks and Caicos Islands	34.78	
53	3	7	Robsen Dick	Vanuatu	36.93	
54	2	7	Nolan George	Saint Helena	37.10	
55	1	5	John Samura	Sierra Leone	37.68	
56	2	2	Ibrahim Kamara	Sierra Leone	37.82	
57	1	3	Josiah Minott	Anguilla	42.33	
58	3	1	Jonathan Irizarry	Anguilla	44.37	

=== Semifinals ===
The semifinals took place during of the evening of 26 July 2026.

Semifinal results
Rank	Heat	Lane	Swimmer	Nation	Time	Notes
1	2	4	Michael Houlie	South Africa	26.61	Q
2	1	4	Sam Williamson	Australia	26.79	Q
3	2	3	Adam Peaty	England	26.82	Q
4	1	5	Chris Smith	South Africa	27.01	Q
5	2	5	Ronan Wantenaar	Namibia	27.21	Q
6	1	3	Filip Nowacki	Jersey	27.22	Q
7	2	6	Archie Goodburn	Scotland	27.31	Q
8	1	6	Oliver Dawson	Canada	27.51	Q
9	2	2	Adam Bradley	Northern Ireland	27.64	R
10	2	7	Max Morgan	England	27.93	R
11	1	1	Bailey Lello	Australia	27.94	
12	1	2	Jadon Wuilliez	Antigua and Barbuda	28.01	
13	2	1	Kyle Booth	Wales	28.06	
14	2	8	Samuel Yalimaiwai	Fiji	28.23	
15	1	8	Kito Campbell	Jamaica	28.26	
16	1	7	Adrian Robinson	Botswana	28.57	

=== Final ===
The final took place during of the evening of 27 July 2026.

Final results
Rank	Lane	Swimmer	Nation	Time	Notes
1st place, gold medalist(s)	5	Sam Williamson	Australia	26.50	
2nd place, silver medalist(s)	4	Michael Houlie	South Africa	26.77	
3rd place, bronze medalist(s)	3	Adam Peaty	England	26.94	
4	6	Chris Smith	South Africa	26.95	
5	7	Filip Nowacki	Jersey	27.20	
6	2	Ronan Wantenaar	Namibia	27.31	
7	1	Archie Goodburn	Scotland	27.42	
7	8	Oliver Dawson	Canada	27.42	
