= Papua New Guinea at the 2026 Commonwealth Games =

- Flag of Papua New Guinea
- CG code: PNG
- CGA: Papua New Guinea Olympic Committee
- Website: pngolympic.org

in Glasgow, Scotland 23 July 2026 – 2 August 2026
- Competitors: 35 in 5 sports
- Flag bearer: Morea Baru
- Baton bearer: Pais Wisil
- Medals Ranked =36th: Gold 0 Silver 0 Bronze 1 Total 1

Commonwealth Games appearances (overview)
- 1962; 1966; 1970; 1974; 1978; 1982; 1986; 1990; 1994; 1998; 2002; 2006; 2010; 2014; 2018; 2022; 2026; 2030

Papua New Guinea competed at the 2026 Commonwealth Games in Glasgow, Scotland. This Papua New Guinea's 16th participation at the games, after making its debut at the 1962 Commonwealth Games.

The King's Baton relay stopped in Papua New Guinea in January 2026.

The Papua New Guinea team consisted of 35 athletes (18 men and 17 women) competing in five sports. Weightlifter Morea Baru was the country's opening ceremony flagbearer. Meanwhile, athlete Pais Wisil was the baton bearer during the opening ceremony.

Papua New Guinea won medal, a bronze in the men's 65 kg weightlifting event. This ranked the country a joint 36th place on the medal table.

== Competitors ==
The following is the list of number of competitors participating at the Games per sport/discipline.

Sport		Men	Women	Total
3x3 basketball		0	4	4
Athletics	Athletics	10	5	15
Athletics	Para-athletics	1	1	2
Boxing		3	2	5
Swimming		2	3	5
Weightlifting		2	2	4
Total		18	17	35

== Medalists ==
The following competitor a won medal at the games. In the by discipline sections below, medallists' names are bolded.

Medal	Name	Sport	Event	Date	Ref.
Bronze	Morea Baru	Weightlifting	Men's 65 kg	26 July	

== 3x3 basketball ==
Papua New Guinea's women's 3x3 basketball team qualified through the World Rankings.

Summary

Team	Event	Group stage						Quarterfinal	Semifinal	Final / BM / CM	
Team	Event	Opposition Score	Opposition Score	Opposition Score	Opposition Score	Opposition Score	Rank	Opposition Score	Opposition Score	Opposition Score	Rank
Women's national 3x3 team	Women's	New Zealand; **L** 6–22	Singapore; **L** 8–21	Tonga; **L** 10–12	England; **L** 4–21	Scotland; **L** 5–21	6	Did not advance			11

=== Women's tournament ===
Roster
The roster consisted of four athletes.

- Jackie Asiba
- Normalisa Dobunaba
- Philomena Isei
- Nauna Lelai

Group B

Pos	Team	Pld	W	L	PF	PA	PD	Qualification
1	New Zealand	5	5	0	105	54	+51	Direct to semi-finals
2	England	5	4	1	89	45	+44	Quarter-finals
3	Tonga	5	3	2	50	72	−22	Quarter-finals
4	Scotland (H)	5	2	3	73	67	+6	
5	Singapore	5	1	4	69	85	−16	
6	Papua New Guinea	5	0	5	33	96	−63	

Source: Glasgow 2026
Rules for classification: 1) Wins; 2) Head-to-head record; 3) Points scored.
(H) Hosts

25 July 2026
10:00

Report

**New Zealand**	**22**–6	Papua New Guinea
Pts: Pupuke-Robati 10		Pts: Dobunaba 3

SEC, Glasgow

25 July 2026
14:30

Report

**Singapore**	**21**–8	Papua New Guinea
Pts: Ang, Lai 8		Pts: Asiba 5

SEC, Glasgow

25 July 2026
20:15

Report

**Tonga**	**12**–10	Papua New Guinea
Pts: M Finau 4		Pts: Asiba 6

SEC, Glasgow

27 July 2026
14:50

Report

**England**	**21**–4	Papua New Guinea
Pts: Gayle 9		Pts: Asiba 3

SEC, Glasgow

27 July 2026
17:00

Report

**Scotland**	**21**–5	Papua New Guinea
Pts: Doherty 8		Pts: Dobunaba 4

SEC, Glasgow

== Athletics ==
Papua New Guinea entered 17 athletes (ten men and seven women), including two para athletes.

Key

Ranks given for track events are within the athlete's heat only.

- **Q** = Qualified for the next round
- **q** = Qualified for the next round as a fastest loser or, in field events, by position without achieving the qualifying target

Men
Track events

Athlete	Event	Heat		Semifinal		Final	
Athlete	Event	Result	Rank	Result	Rank	Result	Rank
Johnny Bai	100 m	10.80	5	Did not advance			
Tovetuna Tuna	100 m	10.91	5	Did not advance			
Pais Wisil	100 m	10.57	4	Did not advance			
Leroy Kamau	200 m	22.14	6	Did not advance			
Tovetuna Tuna	200 m	21.76	4	Did not advance			
Daniel Baul	400 m	49.34	5	Did not advance			
Adolf Kauba	400 m	50.06	7	Did not advance			
William Camilus Peka	400 m	49.88 **PB**	7	Did not advance			
Jiuteis Robinson	800 m	1:51.61	6	Did not advance			
Jiuteis Robinson	Mile	4:19.14	12	—N/a		Did not advance	
Robert Oa	110 m hurdles	14.39	5	—N/a		Did not advance	
Daniel Baul	400 m hurdles	52.83	6	—N/a		Did not advance	
William Camilus Peka	400 m hurdles	54.16	6	—N/a		Did not advance	
Johnny Bai; Leroy Kamau; Tovetuna Tuna; Pais Wisil	4 × 100 m relay	DQ		—N/a		Did not advance	

Field event

Athlete	Event	Qualification		Final	
Athlete	Event	Distance	Rank	Distance	Rank
Lakona Gerega	Javelin throw	65.59	15	Did not advance	

Women & Mixed
Track events

Athlete	Event	Heat		Semifinal		Final	
Athlete	Event	Result	Rank	Result	Rank	Result	Rank
Isila Apkup	Women's 100 m	12.01	6	Did not advance			
Denlyne Kinbangi	Women's 100 m	12.83	5	Did not advance			
Hephzibah Romalus	Women's 100 m	12.70	5	Did not advance			
Isila Apkup	Women's 200 m	25.16	6	Did not advance			
Scholastica Herman	Women's 800 m	2:19.20	7	Did not advance			
Scholastica Herman	Women's mile	5:14.08	12	—N/a		Did not advance	
Adrine Monagi	Women's 100 m hudles	14.62	7	—N/a		Did not advance	
Isila Apkup; Denlyne Kinbangi; Adrine Monagi; Hephzibah Romalus	Women's 4 × 100 m relay	47.42	5	—N/a		Did not advance	
Daniel Baul; Adolf Kauba; Isila Apkup; Scholastica Herman	Mixed 4 × 400 m relay	3:38.25	6	—N/a		Did not advance	

Field events

Athlete	Event	Final	
Athlete	Event	Distance	Rank
Jerome Bunge	Men's shot put (F57)	9.05	9
Regina Edward	Women's discus throw (F44)	19.17	10

== Boxing ==
Papua New Guinea entered five boxers (three men and two women).

Athlete	Event	Round of 32	Round of 16	Quarterfinals	Semifinals	Final	
Athlete	Event	Opposition Result	Opposition Result	Opposition Result	Opposition Result	Opposition Result	Rank
Bid Michael Inoino	Men's 55 kg	Bye	Hossain (BAN); **L** 0–5	Did not advance			
James Paul	Men's 65 kg	Williams (BAH); **W** 3–2	Agathe (MRI); **L** 0–5	Did not advance			
Kua Gunua Mua	Men's 80 kg	Bye	Pitt (WAL); **L** 0–5	Did not advance			
Petronella Nokenoke	Women's 60 kg	—N/a	Kings-Wheatley (ENG); **L** 0–5	Did not advance			
Flora Loga	Women's 60 kg	—N/a		Rainey (SCO); **L** RSC	Did not advance		

== Swimming ==
Papua New Guinea entered five swimmers, two men and three women.

Athlete	Event	Heat		Semifinal		Final	
Athlete	Event	Time	Rank	Time	Rank	Time	Rank
Thomas Chen	Men's 50 m freestyle	25.04	53	Did not advance			
Thomas Chen	Men's 100 m freestyle	55.83	56	Did not advance			
Thomas Chen	Men's 50 m breaststroke	30.43	41	Did not advance			
Thomas Chen	Men's 100 m breaststroke	1:09.87	38	Did not advance			
Thomas Chen	Men's 50 m butterfly	26.68	53	Did not advance			
Josh Tarere	Men's 50 m freestyle	24.40	42	Did not advance			
Josh Tarere	Men's 100 m freestyle	54.25	50	Did not advance			
Josh Tarere	Men's 50 m butterfly	27.05	56	Did not advance			
Joanna Chen	Women's 50 m freestyle	29.18	56	Did not advance			
Joanna Chen	Women's 100 m freestyle	1:03.13	55	Did not advance			
Joanna Chen	Women's 50 m backstroke	33.78	36	Did not advance			
Joanna Chen	Women's 100 m backstroke	1:12.39	34	Did not advance			
Joanna Chen	Women's 50 m butterfly	31.90	47	Did not advance			
Roxanne Kirarock	Women's 50 m freestyle	28.63	50	Did not advance			
Roxanne Kirarock	Women's 100 m freestyle	1:06.13	60	Did not advance			
Roxanne Kirarock	Women's 50 m breaststroke	36.98	25	Did not advance			
Roxanne Kirarock	Women's 100 m breaststroke	1:25.82	28	Did not advance			
Roxanne Kirarock	Women's 200 m breaststroke	3:09.49	16	—N/a		Did not advance	
Roxanne Kirarock	Women's 50 m butterfly	32.25	48	Did not advance			
Jhnayali Tokome-Garap	Women's 50 m freestyle	27.76	43	Did not advance			
Jhnayali Tokome-Garap	Women's 100 m freestyle	1:02.37	49	Did not advance			
Jhnayali Tokome-Garap	Women's 50 m backstroke	31.65	32	Did not advance			
Jhnayali Tokome-Garap	Women's 50 m butterfly	30.26	43	Did not advance			
Thomas Chen; Josh Tarere; Roxanne Kirarock; Jhnayali Tokome-Garap	Mixed 4 × 100 m freestyle relay	3:57.71	17	—N/a		Did not advance	
Thomas Chen; Josh Tarere; Joanna Chen; Jhnayali Tokome-Garap	Mixed 4 × 100 m medley relay	4:26.83	18	—N/a		Did not advance	

== Weightlifting ==
Papua New Guinea qualified three weightlifters (one man and two women), gaining a fourth, a second man, later on reallocation.

Athlete	Event	Snatch (kg)		Clean & Jerk (kg)		Total (kg)	Rank
Athlete	Event	Result	Rank	Result	Rank	Total (kg)	Rank
Kevau Baru	Men's 60 kg	98	9	127	6	225	6
**Morea Baru**	Men's 65 kg	125	3	157	3	282	3rd place, bronze medalist(s)
Thelma Toua	Women's 48 kg	NM		DNF			
Dika Toua	Women's 53 kg	NM		DNF			
