= Swimming at the 2026 Commonwealth Games – Men's 50 metre freestyle =

Men's 50 metre freestyle at the 2026 Commonwealth Games
- Venue: Tollcross International Swimming Centre
- Dates: 25 July (heats, semifinals); 26 July (final)
- Competitors: 72 from 45 nations
- Winning time: 20.97 GR

Medalists
gold medal	Cameron McEvoy	Australia
silver medal	Flynn Southam	Australia
bronze medal	Jamie Jack	Australia

The men's 50 metre freestyle event at the 2026 Commonwealth Games was held on 25 and 26 July at the Tollcross International Swimming Centre. It was won by Australian Olympic champion Cameron McEvoy in a new Commonwealth Games record, leading an Australian clean sweep of the podium.

== Records ==
Prior to this competition, the existing world, Commonwealth and Games records were as follows:

Records before the 2026 Commonwealth Games
Record	Time	Athlete (nation)	Meet	Location	Date	Ref
World record	20.88	Cameron McEvoy (AUS)	China Open	Shenzhen, China	20 March 2026	
Commonwealth record	20.88	Cameron McEvoy (AUS)	China Open	Shenzhen, China	20 March 2026	
Games record	21.30	Ben Proud (ENG)	2018 Games	Gold Coast, Australia	9 April 2018	

== Schedule ==
The schedule is as follows:

All times are British Summer Time (UTC+1)

Date	Time	Round
Saturday 25 July 2026	10:30	Heats
Saturday 25 July 2026	19:00	Semifinals
Sunday 26 July 2026	19:00	Final

== Results ==
=== Heats ===
The heats will be held on the morning of 25 July 2026.

Heat results
Rank	Heat	Lane	Swimmer	Nation	Time	Notes
1	9	6	Joshua Liendo	Canada	21.80	Q
2	9	4	Cameron McEvoy	Australia	21.87	Q
3	8	4	Jamie Jack	Australia	21.95	Q
4	9	3	Calvyn Justus	South Africa	22.00	Q
5	7	4	Flynn Southam	Australia	22.03	Q
6	8	5	David Young	Fiji	22.16	Q
7	8	3	Lamar Taylor	Bahamas	22.20	Q
8	7	5	Jacob Mills	England	22.40	Q
9	6	1	Tendo Kaumi	Uganda	22.63	Q
9	9	5	Mikkel Lee	Singapore	22.63	Q
11	7	3	Abdul Jabar Adama	Nigeria	22.67	Q
12	8	6	Bradley Vincent	Mauritius	22.77	Q
13	7	7	Antoine Sauve	Canada	22.80	Q
14	9	2	L.A.M. Beukes	Namibia	22.94	Q
15	8	2	Guy Brooks	South Africa	22.99	Q
16	7	2	Marvin Johnson	Bahamas	23.02	Q
17	9	1	Joel Watterson	Isle of Man	23.03	R
18	8	7	Clinton Opute	Nigeria	23.15	R
19	6	4	James Allison	Cayman Islands	23.27	
20	8	8	Michael Houlie	South Africa	23.28	
21	6	5	Harry Robinson	Isle of Man	23.32	
22	7	8	Sumbwanyambe Shamambo	Zambia	23.36	
23	6	6	Adam Moncherry	Seychelles	23.47	
23	9	8	Tendo Mukalazi	Uganda	23.47	
25	6	3	Amos Ferley	Seychelles	23.50	
26	8	1	Hansel McCaig	Fiji	23.51	
27	7	1	Jadon Wuilliez	Antigua and Barbuda	23.70	
28	2	7	Yin Chuen Lim	Malaysia	23.82	
29	1	3	Arvin Shaun Singh Chahal	Malaysia	23.85	
30	6	8	Johann Stickland	Samoa	23.86	
31	6	7	Daniel Kish	Cayman Islands	23.89	
32	6	2	Gregory Anodin	Mauritius	23.90	
33	2	2	Alexander Joachim	Saint Vincent and the Grenadines	23.98	
34	4	4	Reuben Taylor	Fiji	23.99	
35	5	3	Zavv Xian Le Lee	Singapore	24.00	
36	5	2	Magnus Kelly	Isle of Man	24.03	
37	4	5	Cleyton Munguambe	Mozambique	24.07	
37	5	4	Haniel Kudwoli	Kenya	24.07	
39	1	7	Hamza Asif	Pakistan	24.17	
39	1	8	Muhammad Fidhyan Mohamed	Sri Lanka	24.17	
41	4	3	Matthew Deffains	Jersey	24.34	
42	4	2	Josh Tarere	Papua New Guinea	24.40	
43	3	5	Finau Ohuafi	Tonga	24.42	
44	5	6	Luka Smit	Malawi	24.46	
45	4	8	Filippos Iakovidis	Cyprus	24.48	
46	4	6	Henry Bolton	Guernsey	24.58	
47	5	5	Mohamed Aan Hussain	Maldives	24.59	
48	5	8	Ivan Snowden	Ghana	24.66	
49	1	2	James Sanderson	Gibraltar	24.76	
50	2	5	Damien Selso de Sousa	Eswatini	24.83	
50	5	1	Christien Kelly	Barbados	24.83	
52	1	1	Delroy Tyrrell	Guyana	24.98	
53	4	1	Thomas Chen	Papua New Guinea	25.04	
54	4	7	Luke Higgo	Cayman Islands	25.15	
55	3	1	Leo Lebot	Vanuatu	25.83	
56	3	4	Ethan Gardiner	Turks and Caicos Islands	26.08	
57	2	6	William Caswell	Saint Helena	26.22	
58	3	3	Asher Banda	Malawi	26.25	
59	3	7	Kean Murenzi Sheja	Rwanda	26.97	
60	3	8	Jayden Ntwali	Rwanda	27.41	
61	3	6	Ousman Jobe	The Gambia	27.52	
62	2	8	Lukas Robbertse	Saint Helena	27.56	
63	3	2	Pap D Jonga	The Gambia	28.30	
64	1	5	Robsen Dick	Vanuatu	28.36	
65	2	1	Nolan George	Saint Helena	29.03	
66	1	4	Moses Yongai	Sierra Leone	30.27	
67	1	6	Josiah Minott	Anguilla	31.87	
68	2	4	Jonathan Irizarry	Anguilla	34.92	
-	2	3	Bijay Ghusa Garry	Solomon Islands	DNS	
-	5	7	Ronny Hallett	Guernsey	DNS	
-	7	6	Matthew Hamilton	Northern Ireland	DNS	
-	9	7	Kyle Martyn Micallef	Malta	DNS	

=== Semifinals ===
The semi-finals took place during the evening of 25 July 2026.

Semifinal results
Rank	Heat	Lane	Swimmer	Nation	Time	Notes
1	2	5	Jamie Jack	Australia	21.55	Q
2	2	4	Joshua Liendo	Canada	21.61	Q
3	1	4	Cameron McEvoy	Australia	21.64	Q
4	1	5	Calvyn Justus	South Africa	21.86	Q
4	2	3	Flynn Southam	Australia	21.86	Q
6	1	3	David Young	Fiji	22.09	Q
7	1	6	Jacob Mills	England	22.24	Q
8	2	2	Mikkel Lee	Singapore	22.25	Q
9	2	6	Lamar Taylor	Bahamas	22.30	R
10	2	7	Abdul Jabar Adama	Nigeria	22.44	R
11	1	2	Tendo Kaumi	Uganda	22.51	
12	2	1	Antoine Sauve	Canada	22.60	
13	2	8	Guy Brooks	South Africa	22.62	
14	1	7	Bradley Vincent	Mauritius	22.68	
15	1	1	L.A.M. Beukes	Namibia	22.85	
16	1	8	Marvin Johnson	Bahamas	22.86	

=== Final ===
The final took place during the evening of 26 July 2026.

Final results
Rank	Lane	Swimmer	Nation	Time	Notes
1st place, gold medalist(s)	3	Cameron McEvoy	Australia	20.97	GR
2nd place, silver medalist(s)	2	Flynn Southam	Australia	21.44	
3rd place, bronze medalist(s)	4	Jamie Jack	Australia	21.47	
4	5	Joshua Liendo	Canada	21.55	
5	6	Calvyn Justus	South Africa	22.17	
6	7	David Young	Fiji	22.18	
7	1	Jacob Mills	England	22.19	
8	8	Mikkel Lee	Singapore	22.23	
