= Swimming at the 2026 Commonwealth Games – Women's 200 metre breaststroke =

Women's 200 metre breaststroke at the 2026 Commonwealth Games
- Venue: Tollcross International Swimming Centre
- Dates: 29 July
- Winning time: 2:23.79

Medalists
gold medal	Angharad Evans	Scotland
silver medal	Kaylene Corbett	South Africa
bronze medal	Ellie McCartney	Northern Ireland

The women's 200 metre breaststroke event at the 2026 Commonwealth Games was held on 29 July at the Tollcross International Swimming Centre.

== Schedule ==
The schedule is as follows:

All times are British Summer Time (UTC+1)

Date	Time	Round
Wednesday 29 July 2022	10:30	Heats
Wednesday 29 July 2022	19:00	Final

== Results ==
=== Heats ===
The heats was held on the morning of 29 July 2026.

Heat results
Rank	Heat	Lane	Swimmer	Nation	Time	Notes
1	3	4	Angharad Evans	Scotland	2:26.48	Q
2	3	3	Tara Kinder	Australia	2:26.99	Q
3	1	4	Aimee Canny	South Africa	2:27.05	Q
4	2	4	Kaylene Corbett	South Africa	2:27.32	Q
5	1	5	Ella Ramsay	Australia	2:27.37	Q
6	2	5	Ellie McCartney	Northern Ireland	2:28.18	Q
7	2	3	Sophie Angus	Canada	2:29.09	Q
8	2	6	Rebecca Meder	South Africa	2:29.96	Q
9	3	2	Maria Erokhina	Cyprus	2:31.31	R
10	3	5	Abbie Wood	England	2:31.74	R
11	1	6	Lanihei Connolly	Cook Islands	2:34.04	
12	1	2	Asia Kent	Gibraltar	2:38.41	
13	3	1	Adara Stoddard	Barbados	2:46.23	
14	2	7	Kelera Madunasoko	Fiji	2:47.86	
15	1	7	Hareem Malik	Pakistan	3:08.84	
16	2	2	Roxanne Kirarock	Papua New Guinea	3:09.49	
	1	3	Sienna Toohey	Australia	DNS	
	3	6	Anna Morgan	Scotland	DNS	
	3	7	Hannah Sterry	Jersey	DNS	

=== Final ===
The final was place during of the evening of 29 July 2026.

Final results
Rank	Lane	Swimmer	Nation	Time	Notes
1st place, gold medalist(s)	4	Angharad Evans	Scotland	2:23.79	
2nd place, silver medalist(s)	6	Kaylene Corbett	South Africa	2:24.46	
3rd place, bronze medalist(s)	7	Ellie McCartney	Northern Ireland	2:24.73	
4	2	Ella Ramsay	Australia	2:24.89	
5	3	Aimee Canny	South Africa	2:25.05	
6	5	Tara Kinder	Australia	2:26.95	
7	1	Sophie Angus	Canada	2:28.95	
8	8	Rebecca Meder	South Africa	2:30.25	
