= Swimming at the 2026 Commonwealth Games – Mixed 4 × 100 metre medley relay =

Mixed 4 × 100 metre medley relay at the 2026 Commonwealth Games
- Venue: Tollcross International Swimming Centre
- Dates: 28 July
- Winning time: 3:40.46 GR

Medalists
gold medal	Iona Anderson; Sam Williamson; Matthew Temple; Meg Harris; Brittany Castelluzzo; Hannah Fredericks; Harrison Turner	Australia
silver medal	Pieter Coetze; Michael Houlie; Erin Gallagher; Aimee Canny; Chad le Clos; Georgia Nel; Hannah Pearse; Chris Smith	South Africa
bronze medal	Matthew Ward; Angharad Evans; Keanna Macinnes; Duncan Scott; Dean Fearn; Lucy Grieve; Joshua Mitchell; Emma Wood	Scotland

The mixed 4 × 100 metre medley relay event at the 2026 Commonwealth Games was held on 28 July at the Tollcross International Swimming Centre.

== Schedule ==
The schedule is as follows:

All times are British Summer Time (UTC+1)

Date	Time	Round
Tuesday 28 July 2026	10:30	Heats
Tuesday 28 July 2026	19:00	Final

== Results ==
=== Heats ===
The heats was held on the morning of 28 July 2026.

Heat results
Rank	Heat	Lane	Nation	Swimmers	Time	Notes
1	2	4	Australia		3:46.04	Q
2	3	3	Scotland		3:48.35	Q
3	2	5	England		3:48.68	Q
4	3	4	Canada		3:51.80	Q
5	3	6	South Africa		3:52.97	Q
6	2	3	Northern Ireland		3:53.00	Q
7	3	5	Jamaica		3:58.00	Q
8	3	2	Isle of Man		4:03.40	Q
9	2	7	Kenya		4:05.16	R
10	2	6	Guernsey		4:06.20	R
11	1	3	Samoa		4:07.31	
12	3	7	Uganda		4:07.68	
13	2	8	Cayman Islands		4:09.43	NR
14	2	2	Jersey		4:15.14	
15	2	1	Ghana		4:16.85	
16	3	8	Fiji		4:17.01	
17	1	6	Seychelles		4:22.10	
18	1	5	Papua New Guinea		4:26.83	
19	1	4	Maldives		4:31.16	NR
	3	1	Bahamas			DNS

=== Final ===
The final took place during of the evening of 28 July 2026.

Heat results
Rank	Lane	Nation	Swimmers	Time	Notes
1st place, gold medalist(s)	4	Australia		3:40.46	GR
2nd place, silver medalist(s)	2	South Africa		3:42.61	
3rd place, bronze medalist(s)	5	Scotland		3:43.70	
4	6	Canada		3:44.23	
5	3	England		3:45.59	
6	7	Northern Ireland		3:49.10	
7	1	Jamaica		3:57.42	
8	8	Isle of Man		4:03.32	
