= Swimming at the 2026 Commonwealth Games – Men's 50 metre butterfly =

Men's 50 metre butterfly at the 2026 Commonwealth Games
- Venue: Tollcross International Swimming Centre
- Dates: 28 July (heats, semifinals); 29 July (final)
- Competitors: 70 from 45 nations
- Winning time: 22.73 GR, OC

Medalists
gold medal	Kyle Chalmers	Australia
gold medal	Ben Armbruster	Australia
bronze medal	Cameron McEvoy	Australia

The men's 50 metre butterfly event at the 2026 Commonwealth Games will be held on 28 and 29 July at the Tollcross International Swimming Centre.

== Schedule ==
The schedule is as follows:

All times are British Summer Time (UTC+1)

Date	Time	Round
Tuesday 28 July 2026	10:30	Heats
Tuesday 28 July 2026	19:00	Semifinals
Wednesday 29 July 2026	19:00	Final

== Results ==
=== Heats ===
The heats were held on the morning of 28 July 2026.

Heat results
Rank	Heat	Lane	Swimmer	Nation	Time	Notes
1	9	4	Kyle Chalmers	Australia	23.07	Q
2	8	4	Ben Armbruster	Australia	23.13	Q
3	8	6	Calvyn Justus	South Africa	23.44	Q
4	7	3	Joshua Liendo	Canada	23.66	Q
4	9	3	Dean Fearn	Scotland	23.66	Q
6	7	4	Cameron McEvoy	Australia	23.74	Q
6	7	5	Jacob Peters	England	23.74	Q
8	8	5	Tzen Wei Teong	Singapore	23.80	Q
9	9	6	Lewis Fraser	Wales	23.83	Q
10	9	5	Mikkel Jun Jie Lee	Singapore	23.90	Q
11	1	4	Chad le Clos	South Africa	23.92	Q
12	8	3	Abduljabar Adama	Nigeria	23.99	Q
13	8	2	Colins Obi Ebingha	Nigeria	24.01	Q
14	7	2	Abeku Jackson	Ghana	24.11	Q
15	8	7	Jarden Eaton	South Africa	24.19	Q
16	9	1	Matthew Hamilton	Northern Ireland	24.25	Q
17	9	2	David Young	Fiji	24.28	R
18	8	1	Joel Watterson	Isle of Man	24.37	R
19	7	6	Cameron Grey	New Zealand	24.40	
20	7	7	Bradley Vincent	Mauritius	24.68	
20	9	7	Jesse Ssengonzi	Uganda	24.68	
22	4	5	Tendo Kaumi	Uganda	24.77	
23	8	8	Collin McKenzie	Jamaica	24.81	
24	6	5	Luke Arthur Matthew Beukes	Namibia	24.82	
25	5	8	Stephen Nyoike	Kenya	24.91	
25	6	6	Johann Stickland	Samoa	24.91	
27	6	4	Harry Robinson	Isle of Man	24.93	
28	9	8	Sajan Prakash Prakash	India	24.94	
29	7	8	Adam Moncherry	Seychelles	24.97	
30	6	3	Markos Iakovidis	Cyprus	24.98	
31	6	7	Hansel McCaig	Fiji	25.00	
32	5	4	Sumbwanyambe Shamambo	Zambia	25.06	
33	6	1	Matthew George Lawrence	Mozambique	25.08	
34	6	8	Peter Allen	Isle of Man	25.15	
35	5	2	Zackary Gresham	Grenada	25.20	
36	4	4	Samiul Islam Rafi	Bangladesh	25.23	
37	2	7	Muhammad Mohamed Fidhyan	Sri Lanka	25.25	
38	6	2	Daniel Kish	Cayman Islands	25.33	
39	7	1	Marvin Johnson	Bahamas	25.44	
40	5	5	Christien Kelly	Barbados	25.54	
41	5	3	Finau Ohaufi	Tonga	25.60	
42	5	1	Collins Saliboko	Tanzania	25.67	
43	5	6	Zavv Xian Le Lee	Singapore	25.85	
44	2	6	Delroy Tyrrell	Guyana	26.00	
44	5	7	Ronny Hallett	Guernsey	26.00	
46	2	3	Hamza Asif	Pakistan	26.09	
47	4	3	Cleyton Munguambe	Mozambique	26.11	
48	1	5	Jordan Gonzalez	Gibraltar	26.18	
48	4	2	Reuben Taylor	Fiji	26.18	
50	4	1	Victor Ashby	Barbados	26.27	
51	4	8	Jonathan Essien	Saint Kitts and Nevis	26.59	
52	4	6	Elijah Bain	Cayman Islands	26.62	
53	4	7	Thomas Chen	Papua New Guinea	26.68	
54	1	7	James Sanderson	Gibraltar	26.69	
55	3	4	Mohamed Aan Hussain	Maldives	26.91	
56	2	1	Josh Tarere	Papua New Guinea	27.05	
57	3	5	Nathan Nagapin	Seychelles	27.65	
58	3	3	Luke Smit	Malawi	28.34	
59	1	6	William Caswell	Saint Helena	28.50	
60	3	6	Asher Banda	Malawi	28.52	
61	3	7	Leo Lebot	Vanuatu	28.67	
62	3	1	Kean Murenzi Sheja	Rwanda	28.74	
63	2	4	Jayden Ntwali	Rwanda	29.12	
64	3	8	Ousman Jobe	The Gambia	29.42	
65	2	2	Bijay Ghusa Garry	Solomon Islands	29.56	
66	3	2	Pap D Jonga	The Gambia	29.62	
67	2	8	Chase Thompson	Guyana	30.35	
68	1	2	Moses Yongai	Sierra Leone	31.45	
68	1	3	Nolan George	Saint Helena	31.45	
70	2	5	Jonathan Irizarry	Anguilla	39.05	

=== Semifinals ===
The semifinals took place during of the evening of 28 July 2026.

Semifinal results
Rank	Heat	Lane	Swimmer	Nation	Time	Notes
1	1	4	Ben Armbruster	Australia	22.82	Q
1	2	4	Kyle Chalmers	Australia	22.82	Q
3	1	3	Cameron McEvoy	Australia	23.41	Q
4	1	5	Joshua Liendo	Canada	23.46	Q
5	2	5	Calvyn Justus	South Africa	23.49	Q
5	2	6	Jacob Peters	England	23.49	Q
7	2	3	Dean Fearn	Scotland	23.50	Q
8	1	7	Abduljabar Adama	Nigeria	23.52	Q, Swim Off: 23.32
8	2	2	Lewis Fraser	Wales	23.52	R, Swim Off: 23.55
10	1	6	Tzen Wei Teong	Singapore	23.64	R
11	2	7	Chad le Clos	South Africa	23.65	
12	1	2	Mikkel Jun Jie Lee	Singapore	23.77	
13	2	1	Colins Obi Ebingha	Nigeria	23.96	
14	2	8	Jarden Eaton	South Africa	23.99	
15	1	1	Abeku Jackson	Ghana	24.03	
16	1	8	Matthew Hamilton	Northern Ireland	24.29	

=== Final ===
The final took place during of the evening of 29 July 2026.

Final results
Rank	Lane	Swimmer	Nation	Time	Notes
1st place, gold medalist(s)	4	Kyle Chalmers	Australia	22.73	GR, OC
1st place, gold medalist(s)	5	Ben Armbruster	Australia	22.73	GR, OC
3rd place, bronze medalist(s)	3	Cameron McEvoy	Australia	22.92	
4	6	Joshua Liendo	Canada	23.30	
5	8	Abduljabar Adama	Nigeria	23.42	
6	7	Jacob Peters	England	23.46	
7	2	Calvyn Justus	South Africa	23.53	
8	1	Dean Fearn	Scotland	23.56	
