= Swimming at the 2026 Commonwealth Games – Women's 200 metre individual medley =

Women's 200 metre individual medley at the 2026 Commonwealth Games
- Venue: Tollcross International Swimming Centre
- Dates: 28 July
- Winning time: 2:09.24

Medalists
gold medal	Jenna Forrester	Australia
silver medal	Aimee Canny	South Africa
bronze medal	Amalie Smith	England

The women's 200 metre individual medley event at the 2026 Commonwealth Games will be held on 28 July at the Tollcross International Swimming Centre.

== Schedule ==
The schedule is as follows:

All times are British Summer Time (UTC+1)

Date	Time	Round
Tuesday 28 July 2026	10:30	Heats
Tuesday 28 July 2026	19:00	Final

== Results ==
=== Heats ===
The heats will be held on the morning of 28 July 2026.

Heat results
Rank	Heat	Lane	Swimmer	Nation	Time	Notes
1	2	4	Jenna Forrester	Australia	2:10.92	Q
2	2	6	Aimee Canny	South Africa	2:10.99	Q
3	1	5	Amalie Smith	England	2:11.38	Q
4	3	4	Abbie Wood	England	2:11.69	Q
5	3	5	Tara Kinder	Australia	2:11.90	Q
6	1	4	Ella Ramsay	Australia	2:12.42	Q
7	3	3	Rebecca Meder	South Africa	2:12.58	Q
8	2	5	Katie Shanahan	Scotland	2:13.26	Q
9	1	3	Ellie McCartney	Northern Ireland	2:13.41	R
10	3	6	Ella Jansen	Canada	2:13.43	R
11	2	3	Freya Colbert	England	2:14.04	
12	2	2	Maria Erokhina	Cyprus	2:24.32	
13	3	2	Oriana Wheeler	Guernsey	2:24.67	
14	1	6	Nafanua Hamilton	Samoa	2:25.37	
15	3	7	Jaiya Simmons	Barbados	2:29.83	
16	1	7	Katie Green	Gibraltar	2:37.16	
17	2	7	Meral Ayn Latheef	Maldives	2:43.93	
-	1	2	Riley Watson	Cayman Islands		DNS

=== Final ===
The final will take place during of the evening of 28 July 2026.

Final results
Rank	Lane	Swimmer	Nation	Time	Notes
1st place, gold medalist(s)	4	Jenna Forrester	Australia	2:09.24	
2nd place, silver medalist(s)	5	Aimee Canny	South Africa	2:09.37	
3rd place, bronze medalist(s)	3	Amalie Smith	England	2:09.61	
4	8	Katie Shanahan	Scotland	2:10.56	
5	7	Ella Ramsey	Australia	2:10.83	
6	2	Tara Kinder	Australia	2:11.09	
7	1	Rebecca Meder	South Africa	2:11.23	
8	6	Abbie Wood	England	2:11.33	
