= Athletics at the 2026 Commonwealth Games – Men's 100 metres (T12) =

Men's 100 metres (T12) at the 2026 Commonwealth Games
- Venue: Scotstoun Stadium, Glasgow
- Dates: 29 July 2026 (round 1); 30 July 2026 (final)
- Competitors: 7 from 6 nations
- Winning time: 10.89

Medalists
| gold medal | Zachary Shaw | England |
| silver medal | Masala Makatu | South Africa |
| bronze medal | George Quarcoo; Guide: Oluwasegun Makinde | Canada |

The men's 100 metres (T12) event at the 2026 Commonwealth Games, also referred to as the men's 100 metres T11/12 event, as part of the para-athletics programme, took place at the Scotstoun Stadium from 29 to 30 July 2026.

The event was open to male para-athletes in the T11 and T12 classification for para-athletes with a visual impairment. Athletes in this classification may use guide runners, and competitors therefore line up in alternate lanes.

== Records ==
Prior to this competition, the existing world and Games records were as follows:

Records T11
| World record | 10.82 | Athanasios Ghavelas (GRE) | Tokyo, Japan | 2 September 2021 |
| Games record | 11.12 | Ananias Shikongo (NAM) | Birmingham, England | 3 August 2022 |
Records T12
| World record | 10.43 | Salum Ageze Kashafali (NOR) | Tokyo, Japan | 29 August 2021 |
| Games record | 10.80 | Jonathan Ntutu (RSA) | Gold Coast, Australia | 12 April 2018 |

== Schedule ==
The schedule was as follows:

| Date | Time | Round |
|---|---|---|
| 29 July 2026 | 12:33 | Round 1 |
| 31 July 2026 | 18:30 | Final |

All times are United Kingdom time (UTC+1)

== Qualification ==
Para athletic event qualification is regulated by a special system organised between Commonwealth Sport and the International Paralympic Committee. Each para athletic event allowed for eight quota places, or 10 in the case of throwing events. All but one quota in each event was available on the basis of the Commonwealth Para Rankings on 31 Match 2026, to a maximum of two per Commonwealth Games Association (CGA), with the remaining quota allocated by Bipartite invitation.

This list did not set a limit on entrants, as other athletes in the same classification, but qualified directly for another event, could enter the event in question, up to a maximum (combined quota, invitation and 'separate event' quota) of three per event per CGA.

== Results ==
=== Round 1 ===
Round 1 took place during the morning session of 29 July 2026.

==== Heat 1 ====
| Place | Lane | Athlete | Nation | Time | Notes |
|---|---|---|---|---|---|
| 1 | 1 | Zachary Shaw | England | 10.91 | Q |
| 2 | 3 | Masala Makatu | South Africa | 11.05 | q |
| 3 | 5 | Nathan Jason | Australia | 11.23 | |
| 4 | 7 | Brian Esogon | Kenya | 11.23 | |
| | | | | Wind: (+2.2 m/s) | |

==== Heat 2 ====
| Place | Lane | Athlete | Nation | Time | Notes |
|---|---|---|---|---|---|
| 1 | 3 | Jaco Smit | South Africa | 11.11 | Q |
| 2 | 5 | George Quarcoo; Guide: Oluwasegun Makinde | Canada | 11.17 | q |
| 3 | 7 | Muhammad Noorhelmie Mohd Rabi | Malaysia | 11.23 | |
| | | | | Wind: (+2.5 m/s) | |

- Namibia's Ananias Shikongo with guide Even Tjiviju were disqualified from heat two after its completion.

=== Final ===
The final was scheduled for the evening session of 30 July 2026.

| Place | Lane | Athlete | Nation | Time | Notes |
|---|---|---|---|---|---|
| 1st place, gold medalist(s) | 5 | Zachary Shaw | England | 10.89 | |
| 2nd place, silver medalist(s) | 7 | Masala Makatu | South Africa | 11.04 | |
| 3rd place, bronze medalist(s) | 1 | George Quarcoo; Guide: Oluwasegun Makinde | Canada | 11.06 | |
| 4 | 3 | Jaco Smit | South Africa | 11.24 | |
| | | | | Wind: (+2.1 m/s) | |
