= Swimming at the 2026 Commonwealth Games – Men's 50 metre backstroke =

Men's 50 metre backstroke at the 2026 Commonwealth Games
- Venue: Tollcross International Swimming Centre
- Dates: 24 July (heats, semifinals); 25 July (final)
- Competitors: 40 from 26 nations
- Winning time: 24.18 GR

Medalists
gold medal	Pieter Coetze	South Africa
silver medal	Oliver Morgan	England
bronze medal	Ruard Van Renen	South Africa

The men's 50 metre backstroke event at the 2026 Commonwealth Games was held on 24 and 25 July at the Tollcross International Swimming Centre.

== Records ==
Prior to this competition, the existing world, Commonwealth and Games records were as follows:

Records before the 2026 Commonwealth Games
Record	Time	Athlete (nation)	Meet	Location	Date	Ref
World record	23.55	Kliment Kolesnikov (RUS)	Russian Cup	Kazan, Russia	27 July 2023	
Commonwealth record	24.04	Liam Tancock (GBR)	2009 World Championships	Rome, Italy	2 August 2009	
Games record	24.62	Liam Tancock (ENG)	2010 Commonwealth Games	Delhi, India	5 October 2010	

== Schedule ==
The schedule was as follows:

All times are British Summer Time (UTC+1)

Date	Time	Round
Friday 24 July 2026	11:26	Heats
Friday 24 July 2026	19:59	Semifinals
Saturday 25 July 2026	19:49	Final

== Results ==
=== Heats ===
The heats were held at 11:26 on 24 July 2026.

Heat results
Rank	Heat	Lane	Swimmer	Nation	Time	Notes
1	5	4	Pieter Coetze	South Africa	24.45	Q, GR
2	5	3	Ruard van Renen	South Africa	24.78	Q
3	4	4	Oliver Morgan	England	24.91	Q
4	3	5	Cameron Brooker	England	25.07	Q
5	4	5	Jack Skerry	England	25.08	Q
6	5	5	Henry Allan	Australia	25.09	Q
7	3	4	Isaac Cooper	Australia	25.11	Q
8	4	3	Matthew Ward	Scotland	25.16	Q
9	3	3	Scott Gibson	Scotland	25.18	Q
10	4	2	Benjamin Winterborn	Canada	25.37	Q
11	3	2	Patrick Johnston	Northern Ireland	25.38	Q
12	5	2	Conor Ferguson	Northern Ireland	25.48	Q
13	1	7	Jack Harvey	Bermuda	25.50	Q
14	4	6	Srihari Nataraj	India	25.52	Q
14	5	6	Jamie Ferguson	Scotland	25.52	Q
16	3	6	Lamar Taylor	Bahamas	25.91	Q
17	4	7	Harry Robinson	Isle of Man	26.16	R
18	4	1	Abeiku Jackson	Ghana	26.48	R
19	5	1	Samiul Islam Rafi	Bangladesh	26.57	
20	5	7	Filippos Iakovidis	Cyprus	26.61	
21	3	1	Tendo Kaumi	Uganda	27.01	
22	3	7	Luke Higgo	Cayman Islands	27.35	
23	3	8	Isaac Thompson	Jersey	27.49	
24	1	5	Delroy Tyrrell	Guyana	27.61	
25	4	8	Amos Ferley	Seychelles	27.82	
26	2	5	Will Sellars	Cayman Islands	28.09	
27	2	6	Oscar Dodds	Jersey	28.12	
28	2	3	Charles Foster	Isle of Man	28.22	
29	1	3	Jordan Gonzalez	Gibraltar	28.30	
30	5	8	Collins Saliboko	Tanzania	28.31	
31	2	4	Matthew Ballah	Saint Vincent and the Grenadines	28.44	
32	2	7	Mohamed Aan Hussain	Maldives	29.18	NR
33	2	1	Zachary Maiden	Guernsey	29.24	
34	2	2	Henry Bolton	Guernsey	29.34	
35	1	6	Iwan Chang Lai Seng	Seychelles	30.80	
36	2	8	Jayden Ntwali	Rwanda	31.74	
37	1	2	Lukas Robbertse	Saint Helena	34.62	
38	1	1	Ibrahim Kamara	Sierra Leone	37.40	
39	1	4	John Samura	Sierra Leone	37.44	
40	1	8	Nolan George	Saint Helena	38.10	

=== Semifinals ===
The semifinals were held at 19:59 on 24 July 2026.

Semifinal results
Rank	Heat	Lane	Swimmer	Nation	Time	Notes
1	2	4	Pieter Coetze	South Africa	24.29	Q, GR
2	1	4	Ruard Van Renen	South Africa	24.56	Q
3	2	5	Oliver Morgan	England	24.65	Q
4	2	6	Isaac Cooper	Australia	24.85	Q
5	1	3	Henry Allan	Australia	24.87	Q
6	1	5	Cameron Brooker	England	24.92	Q
7	2	3	Jack Skerry	England	24.94	Q
8	1	6	Matthew Ward	Scotland	24.95	Q
9	2	1	Jack Harvey	Bermuda	25.20	R
10	2	2	Scott Gibson	Scotland	25.24	R
11	2	8	Srihari Nataraj	India	25.29	
12	1	8	Lamar Taylor	Bahamas	25.35	
13	1	1	Jamie Ferguson	Scotland	25.37	
14	1	2	Benjamin Winterborn	Canada	25.45	
15	2	7	Patrick Johnston	Northern Ireland	25.63	
16	1	7	Conor Ferguson	Northern Ireland	25.85	

=== Final ===
The finals was held at 19:49 on 25 July 2026.

Final results
Rank	Lane	Swimmer	Nation	Time	Notes
1st place, gold medalist(s)	4	Pieter Coetze	South Africa	24.18	GR
2nd place, silver medalist(s)	3	Oliver Morgan	England	24.48	
3rd place, bronze medalist(s)	5	Ruard Van Renen	South Africa	24.51	
4	1	Jack Skerry	England	24.68	
5	2	Henry Allan	Australia	24.72	
6	6	Isaac Cooper	Australia	24.73	
7	8	Matthew Ward	Scotland	24.75	
8	7	Cameron Brooker	England	25.01	
