= Seychelles at the 2026 Commonwealth Games =

- Flag of Seychelles
- CG code: SEY
- CGA: Seychelles Olympic and Commonwealth Games Association
- Website: socga.com

in Glasgow, Scotland 23 July 2026 – 2 August 2026
- Flag bearer: Natasha Chetty
- Baton bearer: Adam Moncherry
- Medals: Gold 0 Silver 0 Bronze 0 Total 0

Commonwealth Games appearances (overview)
- 1990; 1994; 1998; 2002; 2006; 2010; 2014; 2018; 2022; 2026; 2030

Seychelles competed at the 2026 Commonwealth Games in Glasgow, Scotland. This marked Seychelles' 10th participation at the games, after making its debut at the 1990 Commonwealth Games.

The King's Baton relay stopped in Seychelles in October 2025. Sprinter Natasha Chetty was the country's flagbearer during the opening ceremony. Meanwhile, fellow swimmer Adam Moncherry was the baton bearer during the opening ceremony.

The Seychelles team consisted of 18 athletes (13 men and five women) competing in four sports.

== Competitors ==
The following is the list of number of competitors participating at the Games per sport/discipline.

Sport	Men	Women	Total
Athletics	3	1	4
Boxing	3	0	3
Judo	3	1	4
Swimming	4	3	7
Total	13	5	18

== Athletics ==
Seychelles entered four athletes (three men and one woman).

Key

Ranks given for track events are within the athlete's heat only.

- Q = Qualified for the next round
- q = Qualified for the next round as a fastest loser or, in field events, by position without achieving the qualifying target

Track events

Athlete	Event	Round one		Semifinal		Final	
Athlete	Event	Result	Rank	Result	Rank	Result	Rank
Gael Barreau	Men's 100 m	10.94	6	Did not advance			
Odysius Melanie	Men's 100 m	10.82	7	Did not advance			
Gael Barreau	Men's 200 m	DNS					
Odysius Melanie	Men's 200 m	21.88	6	Did not advance			
Iven Moise	Men's 10,000 m	—N/a				31:02.31 SB	15
Natasha Chetty	Women's 100 m	12.13	6	Did not advance			
Natasha Chetty	Women's 200 m	24.96	6	Did not advance			

== Boxing ==
Seychelles entered three male boxers.

Men

Athlete	Event	Preliminaries	Preliminaries	Quarterfinal	Semifinal	Final	
Athlete	Event	Opposition Result	Opposition Result	Opposition Result	Opposition Result	Opposition Result	Rank
Jovanie Bouzin	65 kg	Khan (PAK); L 0–5	Did not advance				
Lorenzo Bonne	70 kg	Bye	Thai (LES); L 0–5	Did not advance			
Jade Micock	80 kg	Dicks (SOL); W 5–0	Quinn (NIR); W 4–1	Panghal (IND); L 0–5	Did not advance		

== Judo ==
Seychelles entered four judoka (three men and one woman).

Athlete	Event	Round of 16	Quarterfinal	Semifinal	Repechage	Final / BM	
Athlete	Event	Opposition Result	Opposition Result	Opposition Result	Opposition Result	Opposition Result	Rank
Jamison Dick	Men's 81 kg	Mlugu (TAN); L 010s1–110s2	Did not advance				
Nantenaina Finesse	Men's 90 kg	Gaulin (CAN); L 000–101	Did not advance				
Alexander Quilindo	Men's +100 kg	Monta (TGA); L 000–100s1	Did not advance				
Amandah Payet	Women's +78 kg	Bye	Avaro (GAB); L 000–100	Did not advance	Durhone (MRI); L 000s1–100s1	Did not advance	7

== Swimming ==
Seychelles entered seven swimmers (four men and three women).

Men

Athlete	Event	Heats		Semifinal		Final	
Athlete	Event	Time	Rank	Time	Rank	Time	Rank
Amos Ferley	50 m freestyle	23.50	25	Did not advance			
Adam Moncherry	50 m freestyle	23.47	23	Did not advance			
Amos Ferley	100 m freestyle	55.04	55	Did not advance			
Adam Moncherry	100 m freestyle	54.52	52	Did not advance			
Iwan Chang Lai Seng	50 m backstroke	30.80	35	Did not advance			
Amos Ferley	50 m backstroke	27.82	25	Did not advance			
Iwan Chang Lai Seng	100 m backstroke	1:07.35	28	Did not advance			
Nagapin Nathan	50 m breaststroke	31.20	47	Did not advance			
Nagapin Nathan	100 m breaststroke	1:11.35	41	Did not advance			
Adam Moncherry	50 m butterfly	24.97	29	Did not advance			
Nagapin Nathan	50 m butterfly	27.65	57	Did not advance			
Adam Moncherry	100 m butterfly	1:04.16	36	Did not advance			
Nagapin Nathan	100 m butterfly	1:03.57	35	Did not advance			
Amos Ferley; Chang Lai Seng Iwan; Adam Moncherry; Nathan Nagapin	4 × 100 m freestyle relay	3:44.72	14	—N/a		Did not advance	
Iwan Chang Lai Seng; Amos Ferley; Adam Moncherry; Nathan Nagapin	4 × 100 m medley relay	DNS		—N/a		Did not advance	

Women

Athlete	Event	Heats		Semifinal		Final	
Athlete	Event	Time	Rank	Time	Rank	Time	Rank
Dorianne Bristol	50 m freestyle	28.69	53	Did not advance			
Aaliyah Palestrini	50 m freestyle	28.67	52	Did not advance			
Angelina Smythe	50 m freestyle	28.15	49	Did not advance			
Dorianne Bristol	100 m freestyle	1:03.09	54	Did not advance			
Aaliyah Palestrini	100 m freestyle	1:01.53	47	Did not advance			
Angelina Smythe	100 m freestyle	1:00.59	38	Did not advance			
Aaliyah Palestrini	50 m backstroke	31.49	29	Did not advance			
Angelina Smythe	50 m backstroke	31.55	30	Did not advance			
Aaliyah Palestrini	100 m backstroke	1:06.67	27	Did not advance			
Angelina Smythe	100 m backstroke	1:08.80	33	Did not advance			
Angelina Smythe	200 m backstroke	2:29.46	18	—N/a		Did not advance	
Dorianne Bristol	50 m butterfly	31.04	44	Did not advance			
Dorianne Bristol	100 m butterfly	1:15.15	29	Did not advance			

Mixed

Athlete	Event	Heats		Final	
Athlete	Event	Time	Rank	Time	Rank
Iwan Chang Lai Seng; Amos Ferley; Dorianne Bristol; Aaliyah Palestrini	4 × 100 m freestyle relay	3:57.35	16	Did not advance	
Adam Moncherry; Nagapin Nathan; Aaliyah Palestrini; Angelina Smythe	4 × 100 m medley relay	4:22.10	17	Did not advance	
