= Swimming at the 2026 Commonwealth Games – Men's 200 metre butterfly =

Men's 200 metre butterfly at the 2026 Commonwealth Games
- Venue: Tollcross International Swimming Centre
- Dates: 27 July
- Winning time: 1:55.05

Medalists
gold medal	Lewis Clareburt	New Zealand
silver medal	Harrison Turner	Australia
bronze medal	Matthew Temple	Australia

The men's 200 metre butterfly event at the 2026 Commonwealth Games was held on 27 July at the Tollcross International Swimming Centre.

== Schedule ==
The schedule is as follows:

All times are British Summer Time (UTC+1)

Date	Time	Round
Monday 27 July 2026	10:30	Heats
Monday 27 July 2026	19:00	Final

== Results ==
=== Heats ===
The heats will be held on the morning of 27 July 2026.

Heat results
Rank	Heat	Lane	Swimmer	Nation	Time	Notes
1	3	4	Harrison Turner	Australia	1:56.47	Q
2	3	5	Lewis Clareburt	New Zealand	1:57.35	Q
3	1	4	Edward Mildred	England	1:57.99	Q
4	1	5	Kris Mihaylov	South Africa	1:58.12	Q
5	2	4	Duncan Scott	Scotland	1:58.29	Q
6	2	3	Sajan Prakash	India	1:58.59	Q
7	3	3	Benjamin Loewen	Canada	1:58.87	Q
8	2	5	Matthew Temple	Australia	1:59.06	Q
9	2	6	Patrick Johnston	Northern Ireland	1:59.93	R
10	1	3	Luke Greenbank	England	2:00.55	R
11	3	6	Se-Bom Lee	Australia	2:00.80	
12	2	2	Oliver Durand	Namibia	2:01.84	
13	1	6	Ethan Stubbs-Green	Antigua and Barbuda	2:04.62	
14	3	2	Jarden Eaton	South Africa	2:07.09	
15	2	1	Tan Khai Xin	Malaysia	2:07.37	
16	3	1	Kajol Mia	Bangladesh	2:12.52	
17	3	7	Victor Ashby	Barbados	2:17.94	
18	2	7	Elijah Bain	Cayman Islands	2:19.13	
19	1	7	Mohamed Rihan Shiham	Maldives	2:23.94	NR
	1	2	Isaac Dodds	Jersey		DSQ

=== Final ===
The final took place during of the evening of 27 July 2026.

Final results
Rank	Lane	Swimmer	Nation	Time	Notes
1st place, gold medalist(s)	5	Lewis Clareburt	New Zealand	1:55.05	
2nd place, silver medalist(s)	4	Harrison Turner	Australia	1:55.38	
3rd place, bronze medalist(s)	8	Matthew Temple	Australia	1:55.45	
4	2	Duncan Scott	Scotland	1:55.85	
5	3	Edward Mildred	England	1:56.75	
6	1	Benjamin Loewen	Canada	1:57.77	
7	6	Kris Mihaylov	South Africa	1:58.02	
8	7	Sajan Prakash	India	1:58.05	
