= Oliver Morgan =

Oliver Morgan may refer to:

- Oliver Morgan (singer) (1933-2007), American R&B singer
- Oliver Morgan (rugby player) (born 1985), English rugby union player
- Oliver Morgan (swimmer) (born 2003), English swimmer
- Oliver Morgan (Hollyoaks), fictional character from the British soap opera Hollyoaks
