= Michael Houlie =

South African swimmer (born 2000)

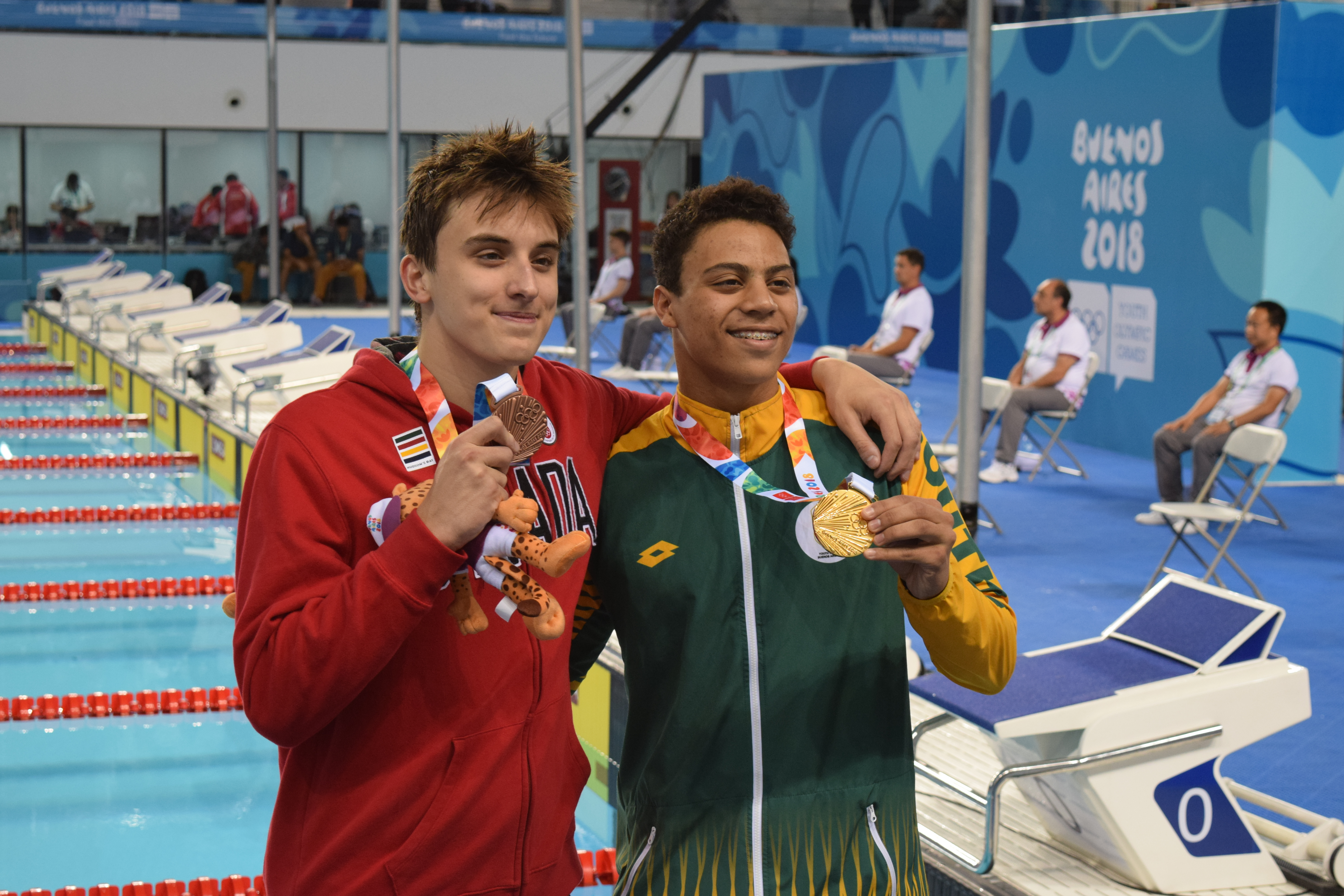
- Houlie (right) and Alexander Milanovich with their 2018 Summer Youth Olympics medals in the 50-meter breaststroke

Personal information
- Nationality: South African
- Born: 27 June 2000 (age 26) Cape Town, South Africa
- Height: 1.89 m (6 ft 2 in)

Sport
- Sport: Swimming
- Strokes: Breaststroke
- College team: University of Tennessee
Medal record
Men's swimming
Representing South Africa
Pan Pacific Championships
Silver medal – second place	2026 Irvine	50 m breaststroke
Commonwealth Games
Silver medal – second place	2026 Glasgow	50 m breaststroke
Silver medal – second place	2026 Glasgow	4×100 m mixed medley
Bronze medal – third place	2018 Gold Coast	4×100 m medley
Bronze medal – third place	2026 Glasgow	4×100 m medley
African Games
Gold medal – first place	2019 Casablanca	50 m breaststroke
Gold medal – first place	2019 Casablanca	4×100 m mixed medley
Bronze medal – third place	2019 Casablanca	100 m breaststroke
African Championships
Silver medal – second place	2016 Bloemfontein	50 m breaststroke
Silver medal – second place	2016 Bloemfontein	100 m breaststroke
Universiade
Silver medal – second place	2019 Naples	50 m breaststroke
Youth Olympic Games
Gold medal – first place	2018 Buenos Aires	50 m breaststroke
Commonwealth Youth Games
Gold medal – first place	2017 Nassau	50 m breaststroke
Gold medal – first place	2017 Nassau	100 m breaststroke
Silver medal – second place	2017 Nassau	200 m breaststroke

Michael Houlie (born 27 June 2000) is a South African swimmer. He competed in the men's 100 metre breaststroke at the 2019 World Aquatics Championships. In 2019, he represented South Africa at the 2019 African Games held in Rabat, Morocco. He also competed in the men's 100 metre breaststroke event at the 2020 Summer Olympics.

== 2022-2026 ==
Houlie achieved a 2022 World Aquatics Championships and 2022 Commonwealth Games qualifying time in the 50 metre breaststroke with a gold medal-winning time of 27.22 seconds at the 2022 South Africa National Swimming Championships. While his time did achieve the qualifying standard, he was not automatically qualified for the World Championships team as swimmers were required to qualify in Olympic events per the selection criteria. Upon completion of the Championships, Swimming South Africa named him as a qualifier for both the World Championships and the Commonwealth Games in the 50 metre breaststroke.

Day two of swimming at the 2022 Commonwealth Games, conducted in July and August in Birmingham, England, Houlie ranked twelfth in the preliminaries of the 100 metre breaststroke, qualifying for the semifinals with his time of 1:01.62. In the semifinals, he placed twelfth with a time of 1:01.24 and did not qualify for the event final. Two days later, he swam a time of 27.10 seconds in the preliminaries of the 50 metre breaststroke, tying Adam Peaty of England for overall first-rank and qualifying for the semifinals. He ranked third overall in the semifinals, second in his heat behind Sam Williamson of Australia, with a time of 27.39 seconds and qualified for the final. He finished 0.04 seconds behind bronze medalist Ross Murdoch of Scotland in the final, with a time of 27.36 seconds, to place fourth.

At the 2022 U.S. Open Swimming Championships, held in Greensboro, United States, Houlie competed representing the University of Tennessee and helped win a silver medal in the 4×100 metre medley relay on day two, splitting a 50.96 for the freestyle leg of the relay to contribute to the final time of 3:43.44. The following day, he placed fifth in the final of the 100 metre breaststroke with a time of 1:02.08.

At the 2026 Commonwealth Games in Glasgow, Houlie won the silver medal in the men's 50 metre breaststroke. He finished in 26.77 seconds behind Australia's Sam Williamson.
