= Mia Phiri =

Zambian swimmer

Mia Phiri (born 5 May 2003) is a Zambian swimmer. Phiri swims collegiately for the North Carolina Tar Heels. At the 2024 World Aquatics Championships, Phiri set a Zambian national record in the women's 50m backstroke. She also won a bronze medal in the women's 50m freestyle at the 2024 All-Africa Games. She represented Zambia at the 2024 Summer Olympics, competing in the women's 50m freestyle. A seventh-place finish in her heat relegated her to being ranked 32nd out of 79 swimmers. In January 2026, Phiri was one of 10 Zambian athletes selected for an Olympic Solidarity scholarship sponsored by the International Olympic Committee.
