= Sam Williamson =

English footballer (born 1987)

Personal information
- Full name: Samuel James Williamson
- Date of birth: 15 October 1987 (age 39)
- Place of birth: Macclesfield, England
- Positions: Defender; midfielder

Youth career
- Manchester City

Senior career*
Years	Team	Apps	(Gls)
2007–2009	Manchester City	1	(0)
2008–2009	→ Wrexham (loan)	5	(0)
2009–2010	Wrexham	23	(0)
2010	→ Fleetwood Town (loan)	4	(0)
Total		34	(0)
- * Club domestic league appearances and goals

Samuel James Williamson (born 15 October 1987) is an English former professional footballer who played as a defender. He last played for Wrexham in 2010.

== Club career ==
=== Macclesfield clubs ===
Sam Williamson started playing football at the young age of 6. Firstly playing for Macclesfield Boys and then to move on to Priory County, both small clubs in Macclesfield. Rapidly his talents were noticed. He was spotted and scouted by Manchester City at a Priory County football match and received a trial at Manchester City YTS.

=== Manchester City ===
Williamson joined Manchester City as a nine-year-old. He progressed to the Academy Under-18 side in 2005, and was part of the Manchester City team which reached the final of the FA Youth Cup in 2006. His performances for the youth team resulted in a professional contract, and he spent the next season playing for the reserves. At the end of the 2006–07 season Manchester City considered releasing Williamson, but decided against it. He was a reserve regular in the 2007–08 season, and was included in a first team squad for the first time when he was an unused substitute against Norwich City for a League Cup tie in September 2007. He made his first team debut in the 3–1 win against Portsmouth on 20 April 2008, coming on as substitute for the injured Richard Dunne.

=== Wrexham ===
In November 2008, Williamson joined Conference National side Wrexham on loan, making his debut on 29 November in a 2–1 win over Stevenage Borough. On 31 December it was reported that Williamson had agreed to make the move permanent when the January transfer window opens. On 1 January Williamson joined the Red Dragons on an 18-month contract after moving from Eastlands on a free transfer. In March 2010, Williamson joined Conference North side Fleetwood Town on loan until the end of the 2009–10 season. On his return to Wrexham, he was released.
