= Swimming at the 2026 Commonwealth Games – Women's 100 metre breaststroke =

Women's 100 metre breaststroke at the 2026 Commonwealth Games
- Venue: Tollcross International Swimming Centre
- Dates: 25 July (heats, semifinals); 26 July (final)
- Winning time: 1:06.07

Medalists
gold medal	Angharad Evans	Scotland
silver medal	Aimee Canny	South Africa
bronze medal	Sienna Toohey	Australia

The women's 100 metre breaststroke event at the 2026 Commonwealth Games was held on 25 and 26 July at the Tollcross International Swimming Centre.

== Schedule ==
The schedule is as follows:

All times are British Summer Time (UTC+1)

Date	Time	Round
Saturday 25 July 2026	10:30	Heats
Saturday 25 July 2026	19:00	Semifinals
Sunday 26 July 2026	19:00	Final

== Results ==
=== Heats ===
The heats will be held on the morning of 25 July 2026.

Heat results
Rank	Heat	Lane	Swimmer	Nation	Time	Notes
1	4	4	Angharad Evans	Scotland	1:06.34	Q
2	2	2	Aimee Canny	South Africa	1:06.68	Q
3	2	4	Ella Ramsay	Australia	1:06.99	Q
4	2	6	Sophie Angus	Canada	1:07.09	Q
5	3	4	Sienna Toohey	Australia	1:07.30	Q
6	4	3	Kaylene Corbett	South Africa	1:07.37	Q
7	2	5	Rebecca Meder	South Africa	1:07.93	Q
8	3	6	Theodora Taylor	Wales	1:08.32	Q
9	4	5	Ellie McCartney	Northern Ireland	1:08.35	Q
10	4	6	Tara Kinder	Australia	1:08.46	Q
11	3	5	Lanihei Connolly	Cook Islands	1:08.71	Q
12	3	2	Sabrina Lyn	Jamaica	1:09.11	Q
13	3	3	Anna Morgan	Scotland	1:09.21	Q
14	2	3	Gabrielle Idle-Beavers	England	1:09.34	Q
15	4	2	Amy Crowley	Wales	1:10.12	Q
16	4	7	Maria Erokhina	Cyprus	1:10.70	Q
17	4	1	Laura Kinley	Isle of Man	1:12.15	R
18	3	7	Asia Kent	Gibraltar	1:13.22	R
19	1	4	Adara Stoddard	Barbados	1:14.67	
20	2	1	Oriana Wheeler	Guernsey	1:14.84	
21	3	1	Alicia Kok Shun	Mauritius	1:15.24	
22	2	7	Zaylie Elizabeth Thompson	Bahamas	1:15.48	
23	1	5	Kelera Mudunasoko	Fiji	1:16.05	
24	2	8	Dorcas Oka	Nigeria	1:17.34	
25	4	8	Hannah Sterry	Jersey	1:17.65	
26	3	8	Vaoahi Afu	Tonga	1:20.66	
27	1	3	Hareem Malik	Pakistan	1:22.51	
28	1	6	Roxanne Kirarock	Papua New Guinea	1:25.82	

=== Semifinals ===
The semifinals took place during of the evening of 25 July 2026.

Semifinal results
Rank	Heat	Lane	Swimmer	Nation	Time	Notes
1	2	4	Angharad Evans	Scotland	1:05.34	Q
2	1	4	Aimee Canny	South Africa	1:06.04	Q
3	2	3	Sienna Toohey	Australia	1:06.69	Q
4	1	5	Sophie Angus	Canada	1:06.74	Q
5	1	3	Kaylene Corbett	South Africa	1:07.31	Q
6	2	5	Ella Ramsay	Australia	1:07.47	Q
7	2	6	Rebecca Meder	South Africa	1:07.53	Q
8	2	7	Sabrina Lyn	Jamaica	1:08.47	Q
9	2	2	Tara Kinder	Australia	1:08.50	R
10	1	6	Ellie Mc Cartney	Northern Ireland	1:08.63	R
11	2	1	Gabrielle Idle-Beavers	England	1:09.27	
12	1	7	Anna Morgan	Scotland	1:09.43	
13	2	8	Maria Erokhina	Cyprus	1:09.44	
14	1	1	Amy Crowley	Wales	1:09.93	
15	1	2	Lanihei Connolly	Cook Islands	1:10.39	
16	1	8	Laura Kinley	Isle of Man	1:13.03	

=== Final ===
The final took place during of the evening of 26 July 2026.

Final results
Rank	Lane	Swimmer	Nation	Time	Notes
1st place, gold medalist(s)	4	Angharad Evans	Scotland	1:06.07	
2nd place, silver medalist(s)	5	Aimee Canny	South Africa	1:06.19	
3rd place, bronze medalist(s)	3	Sienna Toohey	Australia	1:06.47	
4	7	Ella Ramsay	Australia	1:07.16	
5	6	Sophie Angus	Canada	1:07.50	
6	2	Kaylene Corbett	South Africa	1:07.61	
7	1	Rebecca Meder	South Africa	1:07.68	
8	8	Sabrina Lyn	Jamaica	1:08.87	
