= Aimee Canny =

South African swimmer (born 2003)

Personal information
- Nationality: South African
- Born: 21 November 2003 (age 22)

Sport
- Sport: Swimming
- College team: University of Virginia
Medal record
Women's swimming
Representing South Africa
Commonwealth Games
Silver medal – second place	2026 Glasgow	100 m breaststroke
Silver medal – second place	2026 Glasgow	200 m medley
Silver medal – second place	2026 Glasgow	4×100 m mixed medley
Bronze medal – third place	2026 Glasgow	4×100 m freestyle
Bronze medal – third place	2026 Glasgow	4×100 m medley

Aimee Canny (born 21 November 2003) is a South African swimmer. She competed in the women's 4 × 200 metre freestyle relay at the 2020 Summer Olympics.

== 2022–2026 ==
In April 2022, at the 2022 South Africa National Swimming Championships, Canny swam a 2022 World Aquatics Championships qualifying time of 1:58.34 in the 200 metre freestyle in the final to win the gold medal. She was named to the South Africa team in swimming at the 2022 Commonwealth Games in June.

At the 2022 Commonwealth Games, held in Birmingham, England starting in July, Canny placed ninth in the 200 metre freestyle with a time of 2:00.10. The following day, she helped achieve a fourth-place finish in the 4×100 metre freestyle relay in 3:40.31, swimming the lead-off leg of the relay in 54.84 seconds. Day three, she led-off the 4×200 metre freestyle relay with a 1:58.72 to contribute to a final time of 8:02.28 and a fourth-place finish. She followed up her fourth-place finish with a fourth-ranked time of 55.27 seconds in the preliminaries of the 100 metre freestyle the following morning, qualifying for the semifinals. Lowering her time to 54.78 in the semifinals, she qualified for the final ranking sixth. With a time of 54.88 seconds in the final on day five, she placed sixth. Later in the session, she anchored the 4×100 metre mixed medley relay in the final, helping place fourth in a time of 3:44.38, which was a new African record and South African record. She helped set new African and South African records in the final of the 4×100 metre medley relay as well, contributing to a fourth-place finish in a time of 3:59.63 by splitting a 53.80 for the freestyle portion of the relay.First collegiate seasonAt the first meet of her collegiate career, a dual meet against the Virginia Tech Hokies in January 2023, Canny won the 200 yard freestyle for her team, the Virginia Cavaliers, contributing to an overall victory for the Cavaliers. The following month, she achieved another win in the 200 yard freestyle, this time at the 2023 Cavalier Invitational, with a pool record and personal best time of 1:42.78 and helped achieve a 1-2 finish with her teammate Gretchen Walsh.Starting competition on day one of the 2023 Atlantic Coast Conference Championships, 14 February, Canny split the fastest time of all relay swimmers in the women's 4×200 yard freestyle relay with a 1:42.79 for the second leg to contribute to a conference title-winning time of 6:55.15. The following day, she won the b-final of the 200 yard individual medley with a personal best time of 1:55.90. For her third event, the 200 yard freestyle on day three, she placed second in the final with a personal best time of 1:42.62. The next evening, she helped set new US Open and NCAA records in the 4×100 yard medley relay, swimming the freestyle leg to contribute to the winning time of 3:21.80. In her final event of the Championships, she finished in a time of 48.16 seconds in the final of the 100 yard freestyle to place seventh, which followed a personal best time of 48.05 seconds in the morning preliminaries.The following month, on day one of the 2023 NCAA Division I Championships, Canny led-off the 4×200 yard freestyle relay with a personal best time of 1:42.34 to contribute to an NCAA title-winning and pool record time of 6:49.82. Day two, she placed nineteenth in the 200 yard individual medley with a time of 1:56.10. In the 200 yard freestyle on day three, she won the bronze medal with a time of 1:42.50. She won her second NCAA title later in the day in the 4×100 yard medley relay, where she swam the freestyle leg of the relay in 47.27 seconds to help finish in a new pool record time of 3:22.39. On the final day, she started off with a personal best time of 47.98 seconds in the morning preliminaries of the 100 yard freestyle before placing fourteenth overall, sixth in the evening b-final (consolation final), with a time of 48.10 seconds.2023 South Africa Championship Day one of the 2023 South Africa National Championships, conducted in long course metres in April in Gqeberha, Canny achieved a personal best time and a qualifying time of 1:58.20 for the 2023 World Aquatics Championships in the 200 metre freestyle in the morning preliminaries. She won the gold medal in the final with a personal best time of 1:57.82. On the second morning, she achieved a personal best time of 2:16.97 in the preliminaries of the 200 metre individual medley. She lowered her personal best time in the evening final to a 2:13.35, winning the silver medal less than two seconds behind gold medalist Rebecca Meder. She won a second national title in an individual event on the third evening, finishing first in the final of the 100 metre freestyle with a personal best time of 54.65 seconds. On the fourth day, she won the silver medal in the 50 metre freestyle with a time of 25.41 seconds. Personal best times Long course metres (50 m pool)

Event	Time		Meet	Location	Date	Age	Ref
50 m freestyle	25.29	sf	2019 World Junior Championships	Budapest, Hungary	24 August 2019	15	
100 m freestyle	54.65		2023 South Africa National Championships	Gqeberha	14 April 2023	19	
200 m freestyle	1:57.82		2023 South Africa National Championships	Gqeberha	12 April 2023	19	
200 m individual medley	2:13.35		2023 South Africa National Championships	Gqeberha	13 April 2023	19	

Legend: sf – semifinal

=== Short course yards (25 yd pool) ===
Event	Time		Meet	Location	Date	Age	Ref
100 yd freestyle	47.98	h	2023 NCAA Championships	Knoxville, United States	18 March 2023	19	
200 yd freestyle	1:42.34	r	2023 NCAA Championships	Knoxville, United States	15 March 2023	19	
200 yd individual medley	1:55.90	b	2023 Atlantic Coast Conference Championships	Greensboro, United States	15 February 2023	19	

Legend: h – preliminary heat; b – b-final; r – relay 1st leg
