= Canada at the 2026 Commonwealth Games =

- Flag of Canada
- CG code: CAN
- CGA: Commonwealth Sport Canada
- Website: commonwealthsport.ca

in Glasgow, Scotland 23 July 2026 – 2 August 2026
- Competitors: 149 in 9 sports
- Flag bearer (opening): Kady Dandeneau
- Baton bearer: Ryan Bester
- Flag bearer (closing): Julien Frascadore
- Medals Ranked 3rd: Gold 19 Silver 20 Bronze 23 Total 62

Commonwealth Games appearances (overview)
- 1930; 1934; 1938; 1950; 1954; 1958; 1962; 1966; 1970; 1974; 1978; 1982; 1986; 1990; 1994; 1998; 2002; 2006; 2010; 2014; 2018; 2022; 2026; 2030

Other related appearances
- Newfoundland (1930, 1934)

Canada competed at the 2026 Commonwealth Games in Glasgow, Scotland. This marked Canada's 23rd participation at the Commonwealth Games, having competed at every edition of the games.

In April 2025, former Olympic and Commonwealth Games champion Erica Wiebe was named as the country's chef de mission.

The Canadian delegation consisted of 149 athletes competing in nine sports, including four para disciplines, with netball being the only sport in which Canada was not represented. Wheelchair basketball player Kady Dandeneau was the country's opening ceremony flagbearer. Meanwhile, bowls athlete Ryan Bester was the baton bearer during the ceremony. Gold medalist judoka Julien Frascadore served as the country's closing ceremony flagbearer.

The Canadian team finished the Games with a total of 62 medals (19 gold, 20 silver and 23 bronze). This ranked the country third on the medal table. This met Canada's goal of finishing in the top three of the overall medal table.

== Competitors ==
The following is the list of number of competitors participating at the Games per sport/discipline.

Sport		Men	Women	Total
3x3 basketball (wheelchair)		4	4	8
Artistic gymnastics		5	5	10
Athletics	Athletics	22	29	51
Athletics	Para-athletics	6	7	13
Bowls	Bowls	2	2	4
Bowls	Para-bowls	0	2	2
Boxing		3	3	6
Judo		5	5	10
Swimming	Swimming	6	6	12
Swimming	Para-swimming	7	5	12
Track cycling		5	3	8
Weightlifting		6	7	13
Total		71	78	149

== Medallists ==
The following Canadian competitors won medals at the games. In the by discipline sections below, medallists' names are bolded.

Medal	Name(s)	Sport	Event	Date	Reference
Gold	Jordan Carroll; René Cournoyer; Félix Dolci; William Émard; Ethan Ikeda	Artistic gymnastics	Men's team all-around	July 24	
Gold	Josh Liendo	Swimming	Men's 100 metre butterfly	July 26	
Gold	Ellie Black	Artistic gymnastics	Women's individual all-around	July 26	
Gold	Lia Monica Fontaine	Artistic gymnastics	Women's vault	July 27	
Gold	Jordan Carroll	Artistic gymnastics	Men's pommel horse	July 27	
Gold	Félix Dolci	Artistic gymnastics	Men's rings	July 27	
Gold	Ethan Katzberg	Athletics	Men's hammer throw	July 27	
Gold	Félix Dolci	Artistic gymnastics	Men's vault	July 28	
Gold	Maude Charron	Weightlifting	Women's 63 kg	July 28	
Gold	Félix Dolci	Artistic gymnastics	Men's horizontal bar	July 28	
Gold	Charlotte Simoneau	Weightlifting	Women's 69 kg	July 28	
Gold	Kylie Masse	Swimming	Women's 50 metre backstroke	July 28	
Gold	Camryn Rogers	Athletics	Women's hammer throw	July 28	
Gold	Sarah Mitton	Athletics	Women's shot put	July 29	
Gold	Sheriauna Haase	Athletics	Women's 100 metres (T47)	July 30	
Gold	Evelyn Beaton	Judo	Women's 52 kg	July 31	
Gold	Julien Frascadore	Judo	Men's 66 kg	July 31	
Gold	Laurence Biron	Judo	Women's 63 kg	August 1	
Gold	Kyle Reyes	Judo	Men's 100 kg	August 2	
Silver	Ellie Black; Gabrielle Black; Lia-Monica Fontaine; Alyssa Guerrier-Calixte; Lia Redick	Artistic gymnastics	Women's team all-around	July 25	
Silver	Félix Dolci	Artistic gymnastics	Men's individual all-around	July 26	
Silver	Kylie Masse	Swimming	Women's 100 metre backstroke	July 26	
Silver	René Cournoyer	Artistic gymnastics	Men's floor	July 27	
Silver	Ellie Black	Artistic gymnastics	Women's uneven bars	July 27	
Silver	William Émard	Artistic gymnastics	Men's rings	July 27	
Silver	Ann-Sophie Taschereau	Weightlifting	Women's 58 kg	July 27	
Silver	Michael Barber	Athletics	Men's 1500 m (T54)	July 27	
Silver	Oliver Dawson	Swimming	Men's 200 m breaststroke	July 28	
Silver	Noah Vucsics	Athletics	Men's long jump (T20)	July 28	
Silver	Alex Bellemarre	Weightlifting	Men's 94 kg	July 29	
Silver	Chloe Dunbar	Athletics	Women's 100 metres (T47)	July 30	
Silver	Julia Tunks	Athletics	Women's discus throw	July 30	
Silver	Heidi Quach	Judo	Women's 48 kg	July 31	
Silver	Damian Warner	Athletics	Men's decathlon	July 31	
Silver	Scarlett Delgado	Boxing	Women's 54 kg	August 1	
Silver	Marie Al-Ahmadieh	Boxing	Women's 60 kg	August 1	
Silver	Guillaume Gaulin	Judo	Men's 90 kg	August 1	
Silver	Duan Asemota; Jerome Blake; Aaron Brown; Andre De Grasse; Brendon Rodney	Athletics	Men's 4 × 100 metres relay	August 1	
Silver	Frédérique Chiasson; Marie-Éloïse Leclair; Audrey Leduc; Sade McCreath	Athletics	Women's 4 × 100 metres relay	August 1	
Bronze	Mary Jibb	Swimming	Women's 200 metre individual medley SM10	July 24	
Bronze	Jack Gill	Swimming	Men's 100 metre butterfly S10	July 24	
Bronze	Lia-Monica Fontaine	Artistic gymnastics	Women's individual all-around	July 26	
Bronze	Rebekah Groulx	Weightlifting	Women's 53 kg	July 27	
Bronze	Rowan Hamilton	Athletics	Men's hammer throw	July 27	
Bronze	Zachary Gingras	Athletics	Men's 100 m (T38)	July 27	
Bronze	Lia Monica Fontaine	Artistic gymnastics	Women's balance beam	July 28	
Bronze	Félix Dolci	Artistic gymnastics	Men's parallel bars	July 28	
Bronze	William Émard	Artistic gymnastics	Men's horizontal bar	July 28	
Bronze	Nicolas-Guy Turbide	Swimming	Men's 50 m freestyle S13	July 28	
Bronze	Lorne Wigginton	Swimming	Men's 400 m individual medley	July 28	
Bronze	Sophie Angus	Swimming	Women's 50 m breaststroke	July 28	
Bronze	Reed De’Aeth; Lee Melymick; Garrett Ostepchuk; Kyrell Sopotyk	3x3 basketball	Men's wheelchair tournament	July 29	
Bronze	Rose Beaudoin	Weightlifting	Women's 86 kg	July 29	
Bronze	Xavier Lusignan	Weightlifting	Men's 110 kg	July 30	
Bronze	Etta Love	Weightlifting	Women's +86 kg	July 30	
Bronze	George Quarcoo; Segun Makinde (guide)	Athletics	Men's 100 metres (T12)	July 30	
Bronze	Joshua Ofori	Boxing	Men's 80 kg	July 31	
Bronze	Amber-Jane Wall	Boxing	Women's 51 kg	July 31	
Bronze	Evan Dunfee	Athletics	Men's 10,000 m walk	July 31	
Bronze	Savannah Sutherland	Athletics	Women's 400 m hurdles	July 31	
Bronze	Maggie Coles-Lyster	Track cycling	Women's elimination race	August 2	
Bronze	Coralie Godbout	Judo	Women's 78 kg	August 2	

Medals by sport
**Sport**	1st place, gold medalist(s)	2nd place, silver medalist(s)	3rd place, bronze medalist(s)	**Total**
Artistic gymnastics	7	5	4	16
Athletics	4	7	5	16
Judo	4	2	1	7
Swimming	2	2	5	9
Weightlifting	2	2	4	8
Boxing	0	2	2	4
3x3 basketball	0	0	1	1
Track cycling	0	0	1	1
Total	19	20	23	62

Medals by day
**Day**	1st place, gold medalist(s)	2nd place, silver medalist(s)	3rd place, bronze medalist(s)	**Total**
July 24	1	0	2	3
July 25	0	1	0	1
July 26	2	2	1	5
July 27	4	4	3	11
July 28	6	2	6	14
July 29	1	1	2	4
July 30	1	2	3	6
July 31	2	2	4	8
August 1	1	5	0	6
August 2	1	0	2	3
Total	19	20	23	62

== 3x3 basketball ==
Canada qualified a men's and women's wheelchair 3x3 teams. Each team will consist of four athletes, for a total of eight.

Summary

Team	Event	Group stage				Play in	Semifinal	Final / BM / CM	
Team	Event	Opposition Score	Opposition Score	Opposition Score	Rank	Opposition Score	Opposition Score	Opposition Score	Rank
Canada men's team	Men's wheelchair	Kenya; W 16–3	England; L 10–20	Australia; L 12–20	3 q	South Africa; W 15–5	England; L 13–18	Scotland; W 19–9	3rd place, bronze medalist(s)
Canada women's team	Women's wheelchair	South Africa; W 19–3	England; L 12–15	Australia; L 12–10	3 q	Wales; W 21–3	England; L 10–18	Australia; L 17–19	4

=== Men's wheelchair tournament ===
Roster
The Canadian men's team roster was named on June 17, 2026.

- Reed De’Aeth
- Lee Melymick
- Garrett Ostepchuk
- Kyrell Sopotyk

Group A

Pos	Team	Pld	W	L	PF	PA	PD	Qualification
1	England	3	3	0	57	23	+34	Semi-finals
2	Australia	3	2	1	54	33	+21	Play-ins
3	Canada	3	1	2	38	43	−5	Play-ins
4	Kenya	3	0	3	8	58	−50	

Source: Glasgow 2026
Rules for classification: 1) Wins; 2) Head-to-head record; 3) Points scored.

24 July 2026
12:40

Report

Canada	16–3	Kenya
Pts: De'Aeth 8		Pts: Ngugi 2

SEC Centre, Glasgow

26 July 2026
14:00

Report

England	20–10	Canada
Pts: Knight 7		Pts: Ostepchuk, De'Aeth 3

SEC Centre, Glasgow

27 July 2026
12:45

Report

Australia	20–12	Canada
Pts: O'Neill-Thorne 10		Pts: De'Aeth 9

SEC Centre, Glasgow

Play-in

28 July 2026
19:00

Report

South Africa	5–15	Canada
Pts: Williams 4		Pts: De'Aeth, Sopotyk 5

SEC Centre, Glasgow

Semifinal

29 July 2026
13:00

Report

England	18–13	Canada
Pts: Knight 9		Pts: De'Eath 10

SEC Centre, Glasgow

Bronze medal match

29 July 2026
17:30

Report

Scotland	9–19	Canada
Pts: Erskine 8		Pts: De'Eath 9

SEC Centre, Glasgow

=== Women's wheelchair tournament ===
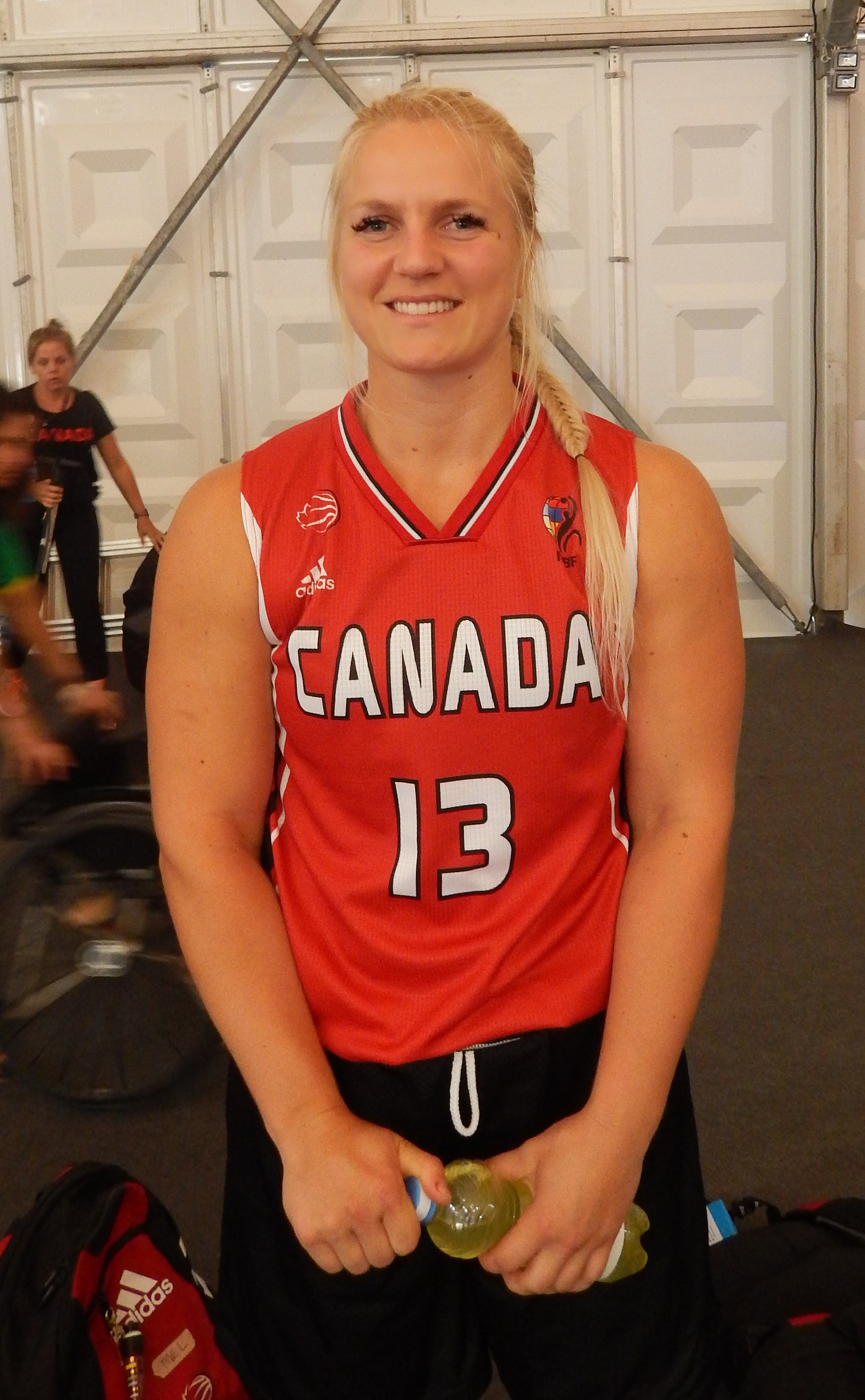
Kady Dandeneau (pictured here in 2018) represented Canada in the women's wheelchair tournament and was also the country's flagbearer at the opening ceremony

Roster
The Canadian women's team roster was named on June 17, 2026.

- Kady Dandeneau
- Élodie Tessier
- Puisand Lai
- Rosie Long

Group A

Pos	Team	Pld	W	L	PF	PA	PD	Qualification
1	England	3	3	0	51	20	+31	Semi-finals
2	Australia	3	2	1	38	30	+8	Quarter-finals
3	Canada	3	1	2	41	30	+11	Quarter-finals
4	South Africa	3	0	3	10	60	−50	

Source: Glasgow 2026
Rules for classification: 1) Wins; 2) Head-to-head record; 3) Points scored.

24 July 2026
14:30

Report

Canada	19–3	South Africa
Pts: Tessier 10		Pts: three players 1

SEC Centre, Glasgow

26 July 2026
12:45

Report

England	15–12	Canada
Pts: Robinson, Atkin 5		Pts: Dendeneau 11

SEC Centre, Glasgow

27 July 2026
14:00

Report

Australia	12–10 (OT)	Canada
Pts: Munro-Cook 8		Pts: Dandeneau 8

SEC Centre, Glasgow

Play-in

28 July 2026
20:30

Report

Wales	3–21	Canada
Pts: Morgan 2		Pts: Dandeneau 15

SEC Centre, Glasgow

Semifinal

29 July 2026
14:30

Report

England	18–10	Canada
Pts: Atkin 9		Pts: Tessier 5

SEC Centre, Glasgow

Bronze medal match

29 July 2026
18:00

Report

Australia	19–17	Canada
Pts: Munro-Cook 12		Pts: Dandeneau 16

SEC Centre, Glasgow

== Artistic gymnastics ==
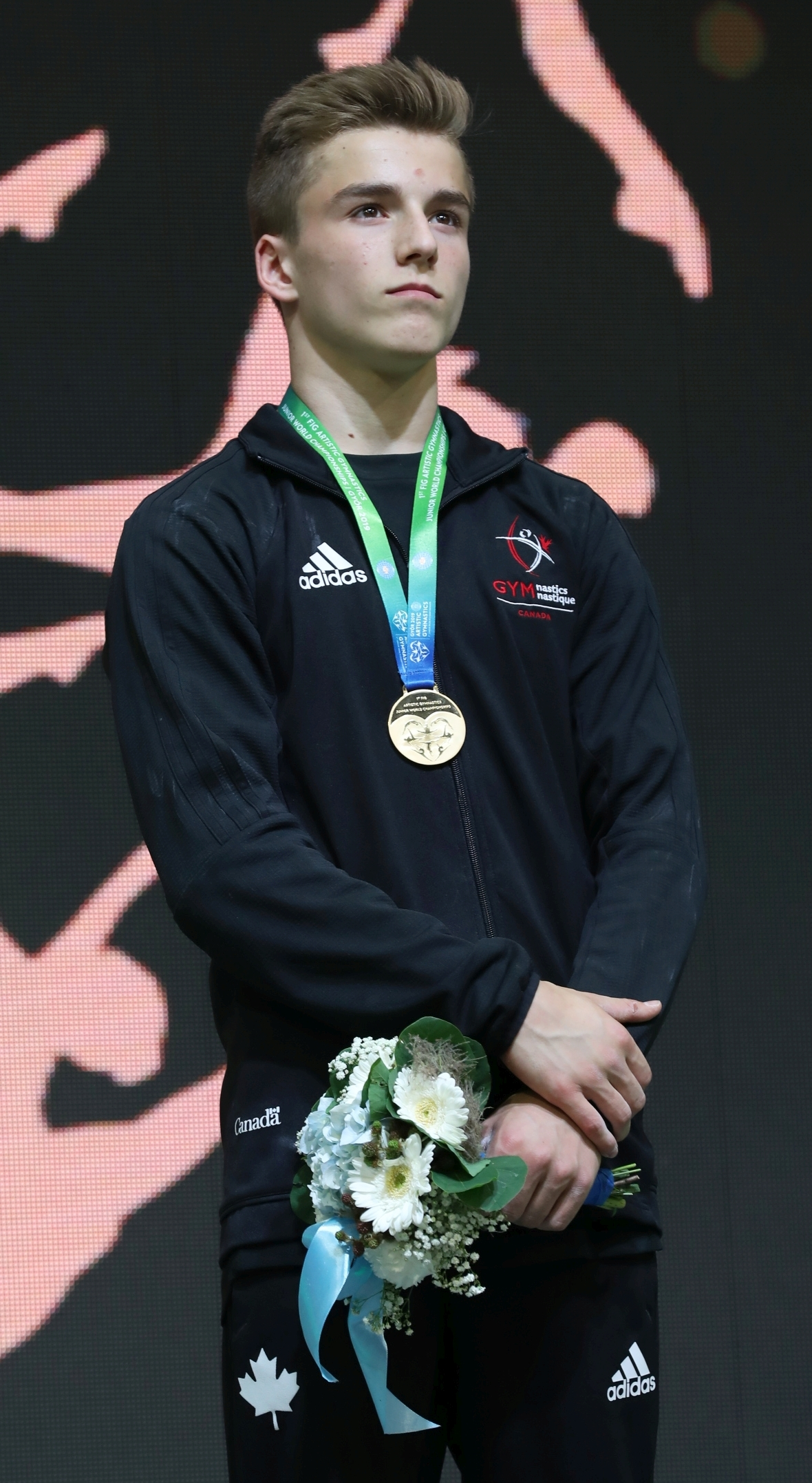
Félix Dolci (pictured here in 2019), won six medals

Canada announced a team of ten artistic gymnasts (five per gender) on July 3, 2026. The Canadian men's team won the country's first gold medal of the Games and captured the team title for the first time in 20 years.

Men
Team Final & Individual Qualification

Athlete	Event	Apparatus						Total	Rank
Athlete	Event	FL	PH	SR	VT	PB	HB	Total	Rank
Jordan Carroll	Team	—N/a	14.550 Q	—N/a	—N/a	—N/a	—N/a	—N/a	
René Cournoyer	Team	13.500 Q	—N/a	13.350	13.850	13.150	11.550	—N/a	
Félix Dolci	Team	13.700 Q	12.750	13.400 Q	14.000 Q	13.550 Q	14.250 Q	81.650	1 Q
William Émard	Team	12.350	~~11.400~~	13.850 Q	14.100	13.650 Q	13.500 Q	78.850	5 Q
Ethan Ikeda	Team	~~10.400~~	12.350	~~12.250~~	~~13.100~~	~~11.300~~	~~10.950~~	70.350	20 NR
Total	Team	39.550	39.650	40.600	41.950	40.350	39.300	241.400	1st place, gold medalist(s)

Individual Finals

Athlete	Event	Apparatus						Total	Rank
Athlete	Event	F	PH	R	V	PB	HB	Total	Rank
Félix Dolci	All-around	13.450	9.500	13.850	14.200	13.950	14.500	79.450	2nd place, silver medalist(s)
William Émard	All-around	13.100	11.850	13.750	13.750	12.500	12.300	77.250	8
René Cournoyer	Floor	—N/a						13.966	2nd place, silver medalist(s)
Félix Dolci	Floor	—N/a						13.233	4
Jordan Carroll	Pommel horse	—N/a						15.000	1st place, gold medalist(s)
Félix Dolci	Rings	—N/a						13.766	1st place, gold medalist(s)
William Émard	Rings	—N/a						13.600	2nd place, silver medalist(s)
Félix Dolci	Vault	—N/a						13.766	1st place, gold medalist(s)
Félix Dolci	Parallel bars	—N/a						13.300	3rd place, bronze medalist(s)
William Émard	Parallel bars	—N/a						13.200	4
Félix Dolci	Horizontal bar	—N/a						14.233	1st place, gold medalist(s)
William Émard	Horizontal bar	—N/a						13.566	3rd place, bronze medalist(s)

Women
Team Final & Individual Qualification

Athlete	Event	Apparatus				Total	Rank
Athlete	Event	VT	UB	BB	FL	Total	Rank
Ellie Black	Team	13.950	13.850	12.900	12.700	53.400	1 Q
Gabrielle Black	Team	—N/a	~~11.600~~	—N/a	~~11.200~~	—N/a	
Lia-Monica Fontaine	Team	13.800	12.200	12.850	13.200	52.050	5 Q
Alyssa Guerrier-Calixte	Team	~~12.900~~	—N/a	12.700	—N/a	—N/a	
Lia Redick	Team	13.500	12.650	~~12.700~~	13.000	51.850	6 NR
Total	Team	41.250	38.700	38.450	38.900	157.300	2nd place, silver medalist(s)

Individual Finals

Athlete	Event	Apparatus				Total	Rank
Athlete	Event	VT	UB	BB	FL	Total	Rank
Ellie Black	All-around	13.850	13.250	13.200	12.750	53.050	1st place, gold medalist(s)
Lia-Monica Fontaine	All-around	14.300	13.100	12.250	13.150	52.800	3rd place, bronze medalist(s)
Lia-Monica Fontaine	Vault	—N/a				14.000	1st place, gold medalist(s)
Ellie Black	Uneven bars	—N/a				13.900	2nd place, silver medalist(s)
Ellie Black	Balance beam	—N/a				12.966	4
Lia-Monica Fontaine	Balance beam	—N/a				13.000	3rd place, bronze medalist(s)
Lia-Monica Fontaine	Floor	—N/a				13.100	5
Lia Redick	Floor	—N/a				13.233	4

== Athletics (track and field) ==
Athletics Canada was provided a quota of 51 able-bodied athletes. The para-athletics team of 12 athletes (six per gender) was named on April 20, 2026. On June 24, 2026, the Canadian team of 51 athletes (22 men and 29 women) was announced, along with the addition of Claire Norek to the para-athletics team. This meant a total of 64 athletes represented the country (29 men and 36 women).

Key

Ranks given for track events are within the entire round.

- Q = Qualified for the next round
- q = Qualified for the next round as a fastest loser or, in field events, by position without achieving the qualifying target

Men
Track events

Athlete	Event	Round one		Semifinal		Final	
Athlete	Event	Result	Rank	Result	Rank	Result	Rank
Eliezer Adjibi	100 m	10.31	21	Did not advance			
Duan Asemota	100 m	10.16	11 q	10.14	15	Did not advance	
Jerome Blake	100 m	Bye		10.12	14	Did not advance	
Eliezer Adjibi	200 m	DNS					
Aaron Brown	200 m	Bye		19.90	2 Q	20.18	4
Brendon Rodney	200 m	DQ		Did not advance			
Austin Cole	400 m	47.87	27	Did not advance			
Christopher Morales Williams	400 m	Bye		45.99	12	Did not advance	
Abdullahi Hassan	800 m	1:47.30	13 q	1:45.77	11	Did not advance	
Justin O'Toole	800 m	1:49.07	19	Did not advance			
Aaron Ahl	Mile	4:03.30	17	—N/a		Did not advance	
Max Davies	Mile	4:01.42	15	—N/a		Did not advance	
Foster Malleck	Mile	3:55.12	5 Q	—N/a		3:56.46	7
Mohammed Ahmed	5000 m	—N/a				13:26.09	7
Justyn Knight	5000 m	—N/a				13:26.18	8
Kieran Lumb	5000 m	—N/a				13:36.04	14 SB
David Moulongou	400 m hurdles	51.00	14	—N/a		Did not advance	
Aaron Ahl	3000 m steeplechase	—N/a				8:31.71	6
Jean-Simon Desgagnés	3000 m steeplechase	—N/a				8:25.43	5
Duan Asemota; Jerome Blake; Aaron Brown; Andre De Grasse; Brendon Rodney	4 × 100 m relay	38.53	4 Q	—N/a		38.11	2nd place, silver medalist(s)
Evan Dunfee	10,000 m race walk	—N/a				40:03.39	3rd place, bronze medalist(s)

- Athletes with a * ran in the heat only.

Field events

Athlete	Event	Final	
Athlete	Event	Distance	Rank
Rowan Hamilton	Hammer throw	75.36	3rd place, bronze medalist(s)
Ethan Katzberg	Hammer throw	80.97 GR	1st place, gold medalist(s)

Combined event – Decathlon

Athlete	Event	100 m	LJ	SP	HJ	400 m	110H	DT	PV	JT	1500 m	Final	Rank
Damian Warner	Result	10.21	7.77	13.84	1.97	50.05	14.04	37.61	4.40	55.54	4:37.50	8036	2nd place, silver medalist(s)
Damian Warner	Points	1044	1002	719	776	812	770	944	819	784	608	8036	2nd place, silver medalist(s)

Women
Track events

Athlete	Event	Round one		Semifinal		Final	
Athlete	Event	Result	Rank	Result	Rank	Result	Rank
Gabrielle Cole	100 m	11.48	14 q	11.44	16	Did not advance	
Audrey Leduc	100 m	—N/a		11.01	2 Q	11.09	6
Sade McCreath	100 m	11.33	7 q	11.19	8 Q	11.09	7
Frédérique Chiasson	200 m	23.15	5 q	22.98	10	Did not advance	
Marie-Éloïse Leclair	200 m	23.50	11 q	23.28	14	Did not advance	
Audrey Leduc	200 m	Bye		22.98	11	Did not advance	
Lauren Gale	400 m	51.59	2 q	52.05	6 q	52.01	7
Nicole McKenzie	800 m	2:05.07	18	Did not advance			
Maeliss Trapeau	800 m	2:03.89	15 q	2:02.42	13	Did not advance	
Kate Current	Mile	4:39.66	16	—N/a		Did not advance	
Simone Plourde	Mile	4:38.50	14 Q	—N/a		4:46.45	11
Lucia Stafford	Mile	4:31.27	2 Q	—N/a		4:40.46	4
Gabriela DeBues-Stafford	5000 m	—N/a				15:09.66 SB	14
Florence Caron	10,000 m	—N/a				32:59.51	13
Mariam Abdul-Rashid	100 m hurdles	12.98	9	—N/a		Did not advance	
Tatiana Aholou	100 m hurdles	12.91	8 q	—N/a		12.86	6
Brooke Overholt	400 m hurdles	56.83	8 q	—N/a		56.10	7
Savannah Sutherland	400 m hurdles	55.73	5 Q	—N/a		54.16 SB	2nd place, silver medalist(s)
Grace Fetherstonhaugh	3000 m steeplechase	—N/a				9:27.49 PB	6
Katelyn Stewart-Barnett	3000 m steeplechase	—N/a				9:46.98	9
Frédérique Chiasson; Marie-Éloïse Leclair; Audrey Leduc; Sade McCreath	4 × 100 m relay	43.15	2 Q	—N/a		42.76	2nd place, silver medalist(s)

Field events

Athlete	Event	Qualification		Final	
Athlete	Event	Distance	Rank	Distance	Rank
Marguerite Lorenzo	High jump	—N/a		1.77	7
Jennifer Elizarov	Pole vault	—N/a		4.10	6
Isabella Goudros	Long jump	6.50	10 q	6.45	10
Sienna MacDonald	Long jump	6.14	15	Did not advance	
Sarah Mitton	Shot put	—N/a		19.88	1st place, gold medalist(s)
Julia Tunks	Discus throw	—N/a		60.67	2nd place, silver medalist(s)
Camryn Rogers	Hammer throw	68.81	1 q	74.91 GR	1st place, gold medalist(s)
Jinaye Shomachuk	Hammer throw	64.84	7 q	64.25	6
Jillian Weir	Hammer throw	63.84	9 q	66.82	5

Combined event – Heptathlon

Athlete	Event	100H	HJ	SP	200 m	LJ	JT	800 m	Final	Rank
Hannah Blair	Result	13.93	1.73	11.33	26.26	5.63	28.20	2:15.35	5340	13
Hannah Blair	Points	988	891	617	775	738	443	888	5340	13
Sienna MacDonald	Result	12.99	1.64	11.21	24.74	6.15	42.21	2:22.35	5827	10
Sienna MacDonald	Points	1126	783	609	911	896	710	792	5827	10

=== Para athletics ===
Track events

Athlete	Event	Round one		Final	
Athlete	Event	Result	Rank	Result	Rank
George Quarcoo; Segun Makinde (guide)	Men's 100 m (T12)	11.17	2 q	11.06	3rd place, bronze medalist(s)
Zachary Gingras	Men's 100 m (T38)	—N/a		11.55 PB	3rd place, bronze medalist(s)
Michael Barber	Men's 1500 m (T54)	—N/a		4:01.84	2nd place, silver medalist(s)
Natalie Thirsk	Women's 100 m (T38)	13.62	4 q	13.81	7
Chloe Dunbar	Women's 100 m (T47)	—N/a		12.33 PB	2nd place, silver medalist(s)
Sheriauna Haase	Women's 100 m (T47)	—N/a		12.23 PB	1st place, gold medalist(s)
Natalie Thirsk	Women's 200 m (T38)	—N/a		29.04 SB	5
Nandini Sharma	Women's 400 m (T54)	—N/a		59.98	4
Nandini Sharma	Women's 1500 m (T54)	—N/a		DQ	

Field events

Athlete	Event	Final	
Athlete	Event	Distance	Rank
Noah Vucsics	Men's long jump (T20)	6.66 SB	2nd place, silver medalist(s)
Maitlan Knoke	Men's shot put (F57)	9.85 SB	8
Claire Norek	Women's shot put (F57)	6.29	6
Christel Robichaud	Women's shot put (F57)	6.69 PB	4
Addisyn Franceschini	Women's discus throw (F44)	32.48	4

== Bowls ==
Canada's bowls team of four athletes (two per gender) was named in February 2026. In May 2026, Canada received an additional two quota in the women's para pairs event. This will mark the country's debut in the women's para pairs event.

Athlete	Event	Group Stage							Semifinal	Final / BM	
Athlete	Event	Opposition Score	Opposition Score	Opposition Score	Opposition Score	Opposition Score	Opposition Score	Rank	Opposition Score	Opposition Score	Rank
Ryan Bester	Men's singles	Sonowal (IND); L 1–1*	Hamada (KEN); W 2–0	Parnis (MLT); L 0–2	Alexander (FLK); W 1*–1	Dzulkeple (MAS); L 1–1*	—N/a	4	Did not advance		
Ryan Bester; John Bezear	Men's pairs	Isle of Man; W 1*–1	South Africa; W 1*–1	Kenya; W 2–0	Scotland; W 1*–1	Norfolk Island; W 2–0	—N/a	1 Q	England; L 0–2	Malaysia; L 0.5–1.5	4
Kelly McKerihen	Women's singles	Fife (AUS); L 1–1*	Andrieux (JER); W 2–0	Rednall (ENG); W 1*–1	Arthur-Almond (FLK); L 1–1*	Jim (COK); W 2–0	Rixon (MLT); W 2–0	3	Did not advance		
Emma Boyd; Kelly McKerihen	Women's pairs	Wales; L 0–2	Kenya; W 2–0	New Zealand; W 1*–1	Botswana; W 2–0	Fiji; W 2–0	—N/a	3	Did not advance		

=== Para bowls ===
Athlete	Event	Group Stage						Quarterfinal	Semifinal	Final / BM	
Athlete	Event	Opposition Score	Opposition Score	Opposition Score	Opposition Score	Opposition Score	Rank	Opposition Score	Opposition Score	Opposition Score	Rank
Anne Hibberd; Jean Stairs	Women's pairs B6–8	England; L 0.5–1.5	Scotland; L 0–2	Australia; L 0–2	New Zealand; L 0–2	Malaysia; L 0–2	6	Did not advance			

== Boxing ==
Canada entered six boxers (three per gender).

Athlete	Event	Preliminaries	Preliminaries	Quarterfinal	Semifinal	Final	
Athlete	Event	Opposition Result	Opposition Result	Opposition Result	Opposition Result	Opposition Result	Rank
Keoma-Ali Al-Ahmadieh	Men's 60 kg	Sachin (IND); L 1–4	Did not advance				
Gabriel Labrie	Men's 65 kg	Bye	Khan (PAK); W 5–0	Cassar (AUS); L 2–3	Did not advance		
Joshua Ofori	Men's 80 kg	Sudamma (SRI); W RSC	Saratibau (FIJ); W RSC	Pappoe (GHA); W WO	Panghal (IND); L 0–5	Did not advance	3rd place, bronze medalist(s)
Amber-Jane Wall	Women's 51 kg	—N/a	Quaye (GHA); W 5–0	Quaye (WAL); W 5–0	Chaudhary (IND); L 0–5	Did not advance	3rd place, bronze medalist(s)
Scarlett Delgado	Women's 54 kg	Bye	Kernachan (SCO); W 5–0	Hall (NZL); W 5–0	Mackie (ENG); W 4–1	Pawar (IND); L 0–5	2nd place, silver medalist(s)
Marie Al-Ahmadieh	Women's 60 kg	—N/a	Bye	Otieno (KEN); W 4–1	Zahra (PAK); W RSC	Ghanghas (IND); L 1–4	2nd place, silver medalist(s)

== Judo ==
Judo Canada was provided a quota of ten athletes. The team was officially named on May 21st, and consisted of ten judoka (five per gender).

Men

Athlete	Event	Preliminaries	Round of 16	Quarterfinal	Semifinal	Repechage	Final / BM	
Athlete	Event	Opposition Result	Opposition Result	Opposition Result	Opposition Result	Opposition Result	Opposition Result	Rank
Julien Frascadore	66 kg	Bye	Lawson (TOG); W 100–000	Moffat (SCO); W 100–000	Agbo (NGR); W 102s1–000	Bye	Balarjishvili (CYP); W 001s2–000s2	1st place, gold medalist(s)
Justin Lemire	73 kg	Withdrew						
Guillaume Gaulin	90 kg	—N/a	Finesse (SEY); W 101–000	Singh Maan (IND); W 110–000s1	Walliss (NZL); W 011–2s1	Bye	Feuillet (MRI); L 000–001s1	2nd place, silver medalist(s)
Kyle Reyes	100 kg	—N/a	Bye	Ceesay (GAM); W 101s1–000s3	Kroussaniotakis (CYP); W 100–000	Bye	Gregory (ENG); W 100–000	1st place, gold medalist(s)
John Messe A Bessong	+100 kg	—N/a	Shah (PAK); W 100s2–000s3	Takayawa (FIJ); W 100–000	Ozcicek-Takagi (AUS); L 000s3–100s2	Bye	Monta (TGA); L 011s1–012s1	5

Women

Athlete	Event	Round of 16	Quarterfinal	Semifinal	Repechage	Final / BM	
Athlete	Event	Opposition Result	Opposition Result	Opposition Result	Opposition Result	Opposition Result	Rank
Heidi Quach	48 kg	—N/a	Babutsi (BOT); W 110s2–000	Esposito (MLT); W 101s1–001	Bye	Dey (IND); L 001–002s1	2nd place, silver medalist(s)
Evelyn Beaton	52 kg	Bye	Hodson (WAL); W 100–000	Easton (AUS); W 001–000s1	Bye	Asvesta (CYP); W 001–000	1st place, gold medalist(s)
Laurence Biron	63 kg	Wood (SCO); W 101–00s1	Knoester (RSA); W 002–001s1	Kabinda (ZAM); W 101–000s1	Bye	Middleton (AUS); W 100s1–000s3	1st place, gold medalist(s)
Charlie Thibault	70 kg	Talikaza (UGA); W 001s1–000s1	Takhellambam (IND); W 000s1–101s1	Petersen Pollard (ENG); L 000s3–100	Bye	Hawkes (NIR); L 000–100	5
Coralie Godbout	78 kg	Bye	Ludford (ENG); W 001s1–000s1	Swan (AUS); L 000s1–010s1	Bye	Narang (IND); W 001s1–000s2	3rd place, bronze medalist(s)

== Swimming ==
Swimming Canada was allocated a total of 12 quota spots. In October 2025, Swimming Canada named a team of 12 swimmers (six per gender). The para-swimming team was named on April 1, 2026, and consisted of five men and two women. An additional five para-swimmers were named to the team on April 30, 2026.

Men

Athlete	Event	Heats		Semifinal		Final	
Athlete	Event	Time	Rank	Time	Rank	Time	Rank
Joshua Liendo	50 m freestyle	21.80	1 Q	21.61	2 Q	21.55	4
Antoine Sauvé	50 m freestyle	22.80	13 Q	22.60	12	Did not advance	
Joshua Liendo	100 m freestyle	49.79	13 Q	48.20	3 Q	48.08	4
Antoine Sauvé	100 m freestyle	DQ		Did not advance			
Benjamin Winterborn	100 m freestyle	DNS					
Antoine Sauvé	200 m freestyle	1:49.24	14	—N/a		Did not advance	
Lorne Wigginton	200 m freestyle	1:49.48	15	—N/a		Did not advance	
Lorne Wigginton	400 m freestyle	3:55.44	11	—N/a		Did not advance	
Benjamin Winterborn	50 m backstroke	25.37	10 Q	25.45	14	Did not advance	
Benjamin Loewen	100 m backstroke	DNS					
Benjamin Winterborn	100 m backstroke	55.55	12 Q	55.39	11	Did not advance	
Benjamin Loewen	200 m backstroke	2:00.77	6 Q	—N/a		1:58.48	6
Benjamin Winterborn	200 m backstroke	2:05.44	9	—N/a		Did not advance	
Oliver Dawson	50 m breaststroke	27.47	8 Q	27.51	8 Q	27.42	8
Oliver Dawson	100 m breaststroke	1:00.33	6 Q	59.87	4 Q	59.70	4
Oliver Dawson	200 m breaststroke	2:10.05	2 Q	—N/a		2:08.39 NR	2nd place, silver medalist(s)
Joshua Liendo	50 m butterfly	23.66	4 Q	23.46	4 Q	23.30	4
Joshua Liendo	100 m butterfly	51.69	3 Q	50.67	2 Q	50.42 GR	1st place, gold medalist(s)
Benjamin Loewen	100 m butterfly	54.40	15 Q	54.05	14	Did not advance	
Benjamin Loewen	200 m butterfly	1:58.87	7 Q	—N/a		1:57.77	6
Lorne Wigginton	200 m individual medley	1:59.09	8 Q	—N/a		1:58.66	6
Lorne Wigginton	400 m individual medley	4:17.23	4 Q	—N/a		4:11.38	3rd place, bronze medalist(s)
Joshua Liendo; Antoine Sauvé; Lorne Wigginton; Benjamin Winterborn	4 × 100 m freestyle relay	3:17.11	3 Q	—N/a		3:15.48	5
—N/a	4 × 200 m freestyle relay	DNS		—N/a		Did not advance	
Antoine Sauve; Oliver Dawson; Joshua Liendo; Benjamin Winterborn; Benjamin Loewen*; Lorne Wigginton*	4 × 100 m medley relay	3:39.82	4	—N/a		3:33.56	4

- Swimmers with stars only competed in the heats.

Women

Athlete	Event	Heats		Semifinal		Final	
Athlete	Event	Time	Rank	Time	Rank	Time	Rank
Delia Lloyd	50 m freestyle	DNS					
Madison Kryger	100 m freestyle	DNS					
Delia Lloyd	100 m freestyle	58.20	27	Did not advance			
Julie Brousseau	200 m freestyle	2:00.71	10	—N/a		Did not advance	
Ella Jansen	200 m freestyle	1:59.16	8 Q	—N/a		1:59.18	8
Julie Brousseau	400 m freestyle	4:11.90	9	—N/a		Did not advance	
Ella Jansen	400 m freestyle	4:10.55	6 Q	—N/a		4:09.75	7
Julie Brousseau	800 m freestyle	—N/a				DNS	
Madison Kryger	50 m backstroke	28.77	9 Q	28.93	12	Did not advance	
Delia Lloyd	50 m backstroke	DNS					
Kylie Masse	50 m backstroke	27.79	1 Q	27.57	1 Q	27.32	1st place, gold medalist(s)
Madison Kryger	100 m backstroke	1:02.19	14 Q	1:00.51	6 Q	1:00.92	7
Delia Lloyd	100 m backstroke	1:02.44	17 R	1:03.22	15	Did not advance	
Kylie Masse	100 m backstroke	59.90	3 Q	59.71	1 Q	58.77	2nd place, silver medalist(s)
Madison Kryger	200 m backstroke	2:12.36	8 Q	—N/a		2:09.38	5
Delia Lloyd	200 m backstroke	2:14.84	10	—N/a		Did not advance	
Sophie Angus	50 m breaststroke	30.79	3 Q	30.99	4 Q	30.86	= (bronze)
Sophie Angus	100 m breaststroke	1:07.09	4 Q	1:06.74	4 Q	1:07.50	5
Sophie Angus	200 m breaststroke	2:29.09	7 Q	—N/a		2:28.95	7
Kylie Masse	50 m butterfly	27.05	11 Q	DNS		Did not advance	
Ella Jansen	200 m butterfly	2:12.32	8 Q	—N/a		2:11.23	7
Ella Jansen	200 m individual medley	2:13.43	10	—N/a		Did not advance	
Julie Brousseau	400 m individual medley	4:51.45	6 Q	—N/a		4:45.43	6
Ella Jansen	400 m individual medley	4:45.19	5 Q	—N/a		4:39.12	4
—N/a	4 × 100 m freestyle relay	DNS		—N/a		Did not advance	
Julie Brousseau; Ella Jansen; Madison Kryger; Delia Lloyd	4 × 200 m freestyle relay	—N/a				8:07.07	5
Sophie Angus; Ella Jansen; Madison Kryger; Kylie Masse; Julie Brousseau*	4 × 100 m medley relay	4:07.19	5 Q	—N/a		3:58.70	4

- Swimmers with stars only competed in the heats.

Mixed

Athlete	Event	Heats		Final	
Athlete	Event	Time	Rank	Time	Rank
—N/a	4 × 100 m freestyle relay	DNS			
Joshua Liendo; Oliver Dawson; Ella Jansen; Kylie Masse; Benjamin Loewen*; Antoine Sauvé*; Madison Kryger*	4 × 100 m medley relay	3:51.80	4 Q	3:44.23	4

- Swimmers with stars only competed in the heats.

=== Para swimming ===
Men

Athlete	Event	Heat		Final	
Athlete	Event	Time	Rank	Time	Rank
Sebastian Massabie	50 m freestyle S7	36.09	7 Q	35.26	7
Hunter Helberg	50 m freestyle S13	30.31	9	Did not advance	
Nicolas-Guy Turbide	50 m freestyle S13	25.29	1 Q	24.96	3rd place, bronze medalist(s)
Hunter Helberg	100 m freestyle S13	1:05.24	7 Q	1:04.02	8
Reid Maxwell	100 m backstroke S9	1:10.31	6 Q	1:08.85	5
Alexander Elliot	100 m breaststroke SB9	1:17.52	9	Did not advance	
Jack Gill	100 m breaststroke SB9	1:13.65	5 Q	1:12.79	4
Fernando Lu	100 m breaststroke SB9	1:11.62	1 Q	DQ	
Alexander Elliot	100 m butterfly S10	1:01.37	4 Q	1:01.09	4
Jack Gill	100 m butterfly S10	1:01.49	5 Q	1:00.30	3rd place, bronze medalist(s)
Fernando Lu	100 m butterfly S10	58.23	1 Q	DQ	

Women

Athlete	Event	Heat		Final	
Athlete	Event	Time	Rank	Time	Rank
Emma van Dyk	200 m freestyle S14	2:30.37	7 Q	2:31.24	7
Danielle Dorris	100 m backstroke S9	1:26.28	9	Did not advance	
Tianna Asala	200 m individual medley SM10	2:49.80	7 Q	2:43.17	6
Katie Cosgriffe	200 m individual medley SM10	2:33.05	2 Q	2:32.70	4
Mary Jibb	200 m individual medley SM10	2:36.20	4 Q	2:32.54	3rd place, bronze medalist(s)

== Track cycling ==
Cycling Canada was allocated a quota of ten athletes (five per gender). On June 2, 2026, a team of eight athletes was named (five men and three women), with two women's quotas being rejected.

Elimination race

Athlete	Event	Final
Athlete	Event	Rank
Jonathan Hinse	Men's elimination race	17
Gabriel Seguin	Men's elimination race	22
Maggie Coles-Lyster	Women's elimination race	3rd place, bronze medalist(s)
Alexandra Volstad	Women's elimination race	18

Keirin

Athlete	Event	1st Round	Repechage	Semifinals	Final
Athlete	Event	Rank	Rank	Rank	Rank
Cole Dempster	Men's keirin	2 Q	Bye	6 FB	11
James Hedgcock	Men's keirin	4 R	3	Did not advance	
Tyler Rorke	Men's keirin	4 R	1 Q	6 FB	12
Sarah Orban	Women's keirin	4 R	4	Did not advance	

Points race

Athlete	Event	Qualification		Final	
Athlete	Event	Points	Rank	Points	Rank
Gabriel Seguin	Men's point race	10	10	Did not advance	
Maggie Coles-Lyster	Women's point race	—N/a		30	7
Alexandra Volstad	Women's point race	—N/a		1	17

Pursuit

Athlete	Event	Qualification		Final	
Athlete	Event	Time	Rank	Opponent Results	Rank
Jonathan Hinse	Men's individual pursuit	4:19.681	15	Did not advance	
Gabriel Seguin	Men's individual pursuit	4:24.561	16	Did not advance	
Maggie Coles-Lyster	Women's individual pursuit	4:38.485	9	Did not advance	
Alexandra Volstad	Women's individual pursuit	4:46.830	12	Did not advance	

Scratch race

Athlete	Event	Qualification	Final
Athlete	Event	Rank	Rank
Jonathan Hinse	Men's scratch race	10 Q	DNF
Gabriel Seguin	Men's scratch race	12 Q	9
Maggie Coles-Lyster	Women's scratch race	—N/a	6
Alexandra Volstad	Women's scratch race	—N/a	8

Sprint

Athlete	Event	Qualification		Round 1	Quarterfinals	Semifinals	Final	
Athlete	Event	Time	Rank	Opposition Result	Opposition Result	Opposition Result	Opposition Result	Rank
Cole Dempster	Men's sprint	9.988	16 Q	Hoffman (AUS); L	Did not advance			
James Hedgcock	Men's sprint	10.008	17	Did not advance				
Tyler Rorke	Men's sprint	9.874	13 Q	Turnbull (ENG); W	Ryan (AUS); L	Did not advance		
Sarah Orban	Women's sprint	11.073	18	Did not advance				
Cole Dempster; James Hedgcock; Tyler Rorke	Men's team sprint	44.131	5	—N/a			Did not advance	

Time trial

Athlete	Event	Time	Rank
Cole Dempster	Men's time trial	1:02.169	12
James Hedgcock	Men's time trial	1:01.279	9

== Weightlifting ==
Canada qualified two weightlifters through the 2025 Commonwealth Weightlifting Championships. Both Maude Charron and Braydon Kennedy won their respective events to qualify. On 18 May 2026, the IWF Commonwealth Games weightlifting ranking lists were finalized. Canada qualified eleven further weightlifters through the rankings, for a total of 13 (six men and seven women). The final team was officially named on June 23, 2026.

Men

Athlete	Event	Snatch (kg)		Clean & Jerk (kg)		Total (kg)	Rank
Athlete	Event	Result	Rank	Result	Rank	Total (kg)	Rank
Antonin Lanoue	60 kg	101	6	132	5	233	5
Matt Darsigny	71 kg	130	4	155	=6	285	6
Shad Darsigny	79 kg	140	4	175	4	315	4
Braydon Kennedy	88 kg	NM		DNF			
Alex Bellemarre	94 kg	159 GR	1	187	2	346	2nd place, silver medalist(s)
Xavier Lusignan	110 kg	159	3	197	3	356	3rd place, bronze medalist(s)

Women

Athlete	Event	Snatch (kg)		Clean & Jerk (kg)		Total (kg)	Rank
Athlete	Event	Result	Rank	Result	Rank	Total (kg)	Rank
Rebekah Groulx	53 kg	83	3	95	5	178	3rd place, bronze medalist(s)
Ann-Sophie Taschereau	58 kg	94	2	121	2	215	2nd place, silver medalist(s)
Maude Charron	63 kg	102 GR	1	130 GR	1	232 GR	1st place, gold medalist(s)
Charlotte Simoneau	69 kg	108 GR	1	132 GR, CR	1	240 GR	1st place, gold medalist(s)
Rosalie Dumas	77 kg	102	2	116	5	218	5
Rose Beaudoin	86 kg	103	=3	127	3	230	3rd place, bronze medalist(s)
Etta Love	+86 kg	106	4	144	2	250	3rd place, bronze medalist(s)

== See also ==
- Canada at the 2026 Winter Olympics
- Canada at the 2026 Winter Paralympics
- Canada at the 2026 Summer Youth Olympics
- Canada at the 2028 Summer Olympics
