= Cyprus at the 2026 Commonwealth Games =

- Flag of Cyprus
- CG code: CYP
- CGA: Cyprus Olympic Committee
- Website: olympic.org.cy (in Greek)

in Glasgow, Scotland 23 July 2026 – 2 August 2026
- Competitors: 36 in 5 sports
- Flag bearer (opening): Elena Kulichenko
- Baton bearer: Maria Markou
- Flag bearer (closing): Giannis Antoniou
- Medals Ranked 14th: Gold 1 Silver 5 Bronze 6 Total 12

Commonwealth Games appearances (overview)
- 1978; 1982; 1986; 1990; 1994; 1998; 2002; 2006; 2010; 2014; 2018; 2022; 2026; 2030

Cyprus competed at the 2026 Commonwealth Games in Glasgow, Scotland. This marked Cyprus's 12th participation at the games, after making its debut at the 1978 Commonwealth Games.

The King's Baton relay stopped in Cyprus in May 2026.

The Cypriot team consisted of 36 athletes (23 men and 13 women) competing in five sports. High jumper Elena Kulichenko was the country's opening ceremony flagbearer. Meanwhile, para powerlifter Maria Markou was the baton bearer during the opening ceremony. The Cypriot team also consisted of 29 officials. Cyprus' only gold medalist at the games, Giannis Antoniou served as the country's closing ceremony flagbearer.

Cyprus won 12 medals (one gold, five silver and six bronze) to rank 14th on the medal table. The marked the country's second best performance (in terms of overall medals) at a Commonwealth Games.

== Competitors ==
The following is the list of number of competitors participating at the Games per sport/discipline.

Sport		Men	Women	Total
Artistic gymnastics		5	1	6
Athletics		7	6	13
Judo		6	2	8
Swimming		4	2	6
Weightlifting	Weightlifting	1	1	2
Weightlifting	Para powerlifting	0	1	1
Total		23	13	36

== Medalists ==
The following Cypriot competitors won medals at the games. In the by discipline sections below, medallists' names are bolded.

Medal	Name	Sport	Event	Date	Ref.
Gold	Giannis Antoniou	Judo	Men's +100 kg	2 August	
Silver	Iosif Kesidis	Athletics	Men's hammer throw	27 July	
Silver	Marios Georgiou	Artistic gymnastics	Men's parallel bars	28 July	
Silver	Marios Georgiou	Artistic gymnastics	Men's horizontal bar	28 July	
Silver	Sofia Asvesta	Judo	Women's 52 kg	31 July	
Silver	Georgios Balarjishvili	Judo	Men's 66 kg	31 July	
Bronze	Milan Trajkovic	Athletics	Men's 110 m hurdles	27 July	
Bronze	Neofytos Kyriakou	Artistic gymnastics	Men's vault	28 July	
Bronze	Petros Christodoulides	Judo	Men's 66 kg	31 July	
Bronze	Odysseas Georgakis	Judo	Men's 81 kg	1 August	
Bronze	Georgios Kroussaniotakis	Judo	Men's 100 kg	2 August	
Bronze	Zanet Michaelidou	Judo	Women's 78 kg	2 August	

== Artistic Gymnastics ==
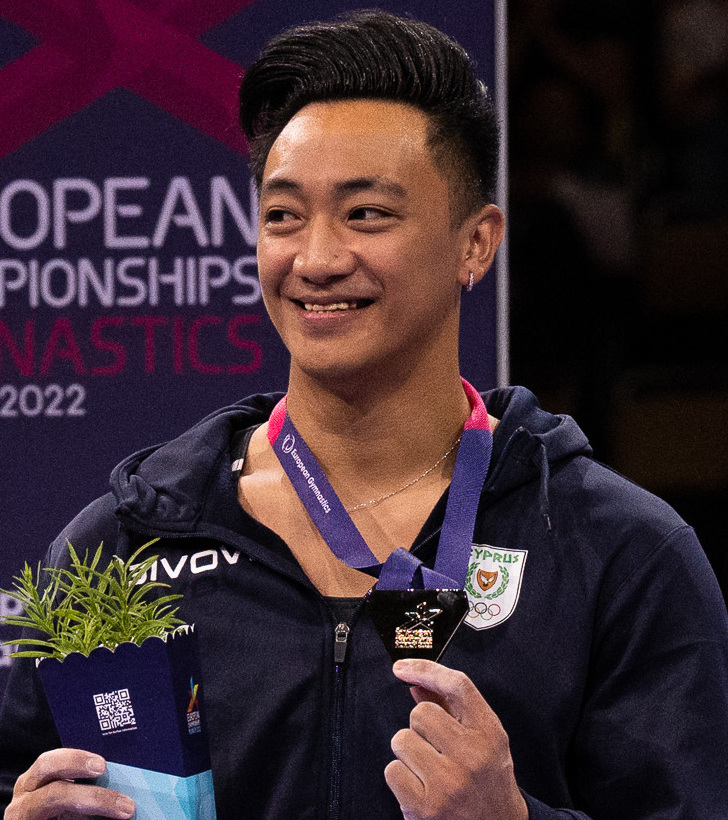
Marios Georgiou, pictured here in 2022, won two silver medals

Cyprus selected six gymnasts, five men and one woman.

Men
Team Final & Individual Qualification

Athlete	Event	Apparatus						Total	Rank
Athlete	Event	FL	PH	SR	VT	PB	HB	Total	Rank
Marios Georgiou	Team	13.000	13.650 Q	12.750	14.000	13.800 Q	13.750 Q	80.950	2 Q
Sokratis Pilakouris	Team	—N/a		12.850 Q	—N/a				
Neofytos Kyriakou	Team	12.400	~~9.900~~	—N/a	13.850 Q	11.150	12.250	—N/a	
Georgios Angonas	Team	~~10.750~~	10.600	12.000	~~13.350~~	13.200	11.900	71.800	16 Q
Kyriakos Markidis	Team	11.000	11.650	~~11.650~~	13.850 Q	11.850	~~10.350~~	70.350	19
Total	Team	36.400	35.900	37.600	41.700	38.850	37.900	228.350	5

Individual Finals

Athlete	Event	Apparatus						Total	Rank
Athlete	Event	FX	PH	SR	VT	PB	HB	Total	Rank
Marios Georgiou	All-around	13.150	12.800	12.350	13.500	13.500	13.650	78.950	4
Georgios Angonas	All-around	10.400	10.200	11.700	13.000	13.100	12.350	70.750	14

Athlete	Apparatus	Score	Rank
Marios Georgiou	Pommel horse	13.100	5
Sokratis Pilakouris	Rings	13.466	4
Neofytos Kyriakou	Vault	13.733	3rd place, bronze medalist(s)
Kyriakos Markidis	Vault	13.500	8
Marios Georgiou	Parallel bars	13.800	2nd place, silver medalist(s)
Marios Georgiou	Horizontal bar	14.166	2nd place, silver medalist(s)

Women
Individual Qualification

Athlete	Event	Apparatus				Total	Rank
Athlete	Event	VT	UB	BB	FL	Total	Rank
Georgia Charalambous	Women's All-around	11.450	11.200	10.200	11.150	44.000	26 R2

== Athletics ==
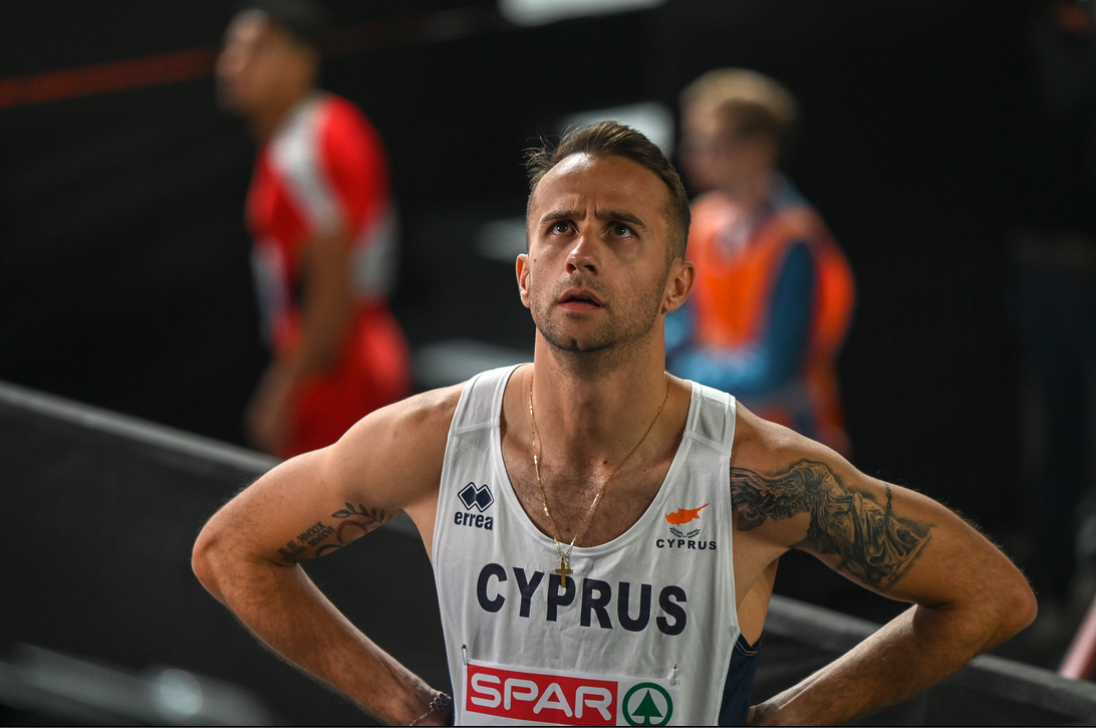
Milan Trajkovic won bronze in the men's 110 m hurdles event

Cyprus entered 13 athletes, seven men and six women.

Key

Ranks given for track events are within the athlete's heat only.

- Q = Qualified for the next round
- q = Qualified for the next round as a fastest loser or, in field events, by position without achieving the qualifying target

Men

Track & road events

Athlete	Event	Heat		Semifinal		Final	
Athlete	Event	Result	Rank	Result	Rank	Result	Rank
Milan Trajkovic	110 m hurdles	13.21	1 Q	—N/a		13.32	3rd place, bronze medalist(s)

Field events

Athlete	Event	Qualification		Final	
Athlete	Event	Distance	Rank	Distance	Rank
Dimitris Christofi	Pole vault	—N/a		4.90	10
Christos Tamanis	Pole vault	—N/a		5.10	9
Alexandros Poursanidis	Hammer throw	—N/a		66.79	7
Iosif Kesidis	Hammer throw	—N/a		76.97	2nd place, silver medalist(s)
Iosif Papa	Discus throw	—N/a		59.31	6
Petros Michaelides	Shot put	18.70	8 q	19.23	8

Women

Track & road events

Athlete	Event	Heat		Semifinal		Final	
Athlete	Event	Result	Rank	Result	Rank	Result	Rank
Olivia Fotopoulou	200 m	23.62	2 q	24.20	8	Did not advance	

Field events

Athlete	Event	Qualification		Final	
Athlete	Event	Distance	Rank	Distance	Rank
Filippa Fotopoulou	Long jump	6.56	7 q	6.26	12
Styliana Ioannidou	High jump	—N/a		1.72	10
Elena Kulichenko	High jump	—N/a		1.82	5
Valentina Savva	Hammer throw	65.02	6 q	62.27	10
Christiana Ellina	Javelin throw	—N/a		49.38	8

== Judo ==
Cyprus entered six judoka, six men and two women.

Men

Athlete	Event	Round of 32	Round of 16	Quarterfinals	Semifinals	Repechage	Final/BM	
Athlete	Event	Opposition Result	Opposition Result	Opposition Result	Opposition Result	Opposition Result	Opposition Result	Rank
Georgios Balarjishvili	66 kg	Bye	Rabet (JEY); W 100–000	Fryer (ENG); W 011s1–000s1	Christodoulidis (CYP); W 101s2–000s1	Bye	Frascadore (CAN); L 000–001	2nd place, silver medalist(s)
Petros Christodoulides	66 kg	Bye	Zulu (ZAM); W 100s1–000s3	Majgul (IND); W 001s1–000s2	Balarjishvili (CYP); L 000s1–101s2	Bye	Middleton (AUS); W 001–000	3rd place, bronze medalist(s)
Odysseas Georgakis	81 kg	—N/a	Bye	Harsh Tokas (IND); W 001s2–000s2	Meuwsen (RSA); L 0000s2–100s2	Bye	Nkero (GAB); W 100s1–001s1	3rd place, bronze medalist(s)
George Krousanniotakis	100 kg	—N/a	David (MRI); W 101–000	Zan (CMR); W 100s1–002s2	Reyes (CAN); L 000–100	Bye	Michael (CYP); W 100s2–001s3	3rd place, bronze medalist(s)
Aristos Michael	100 kg	Bye	Singh (IND); W 100s2–000s1	Barratt (WAL); L 000s1–100	Did not advance	Rowley (NZL); W 101–000	Kroussaniotakis (CYP); L 001s3–100s2	5
Giannis Antoniou	+100 kg	—N/a	Bye	Whitehouse (WAL); W 100–000	Andrews (NZL); W 100–000	Bye	Ozcicek-Takagi (AUS); W 010s1–000s2	1st place, gold medalist(s)

Women

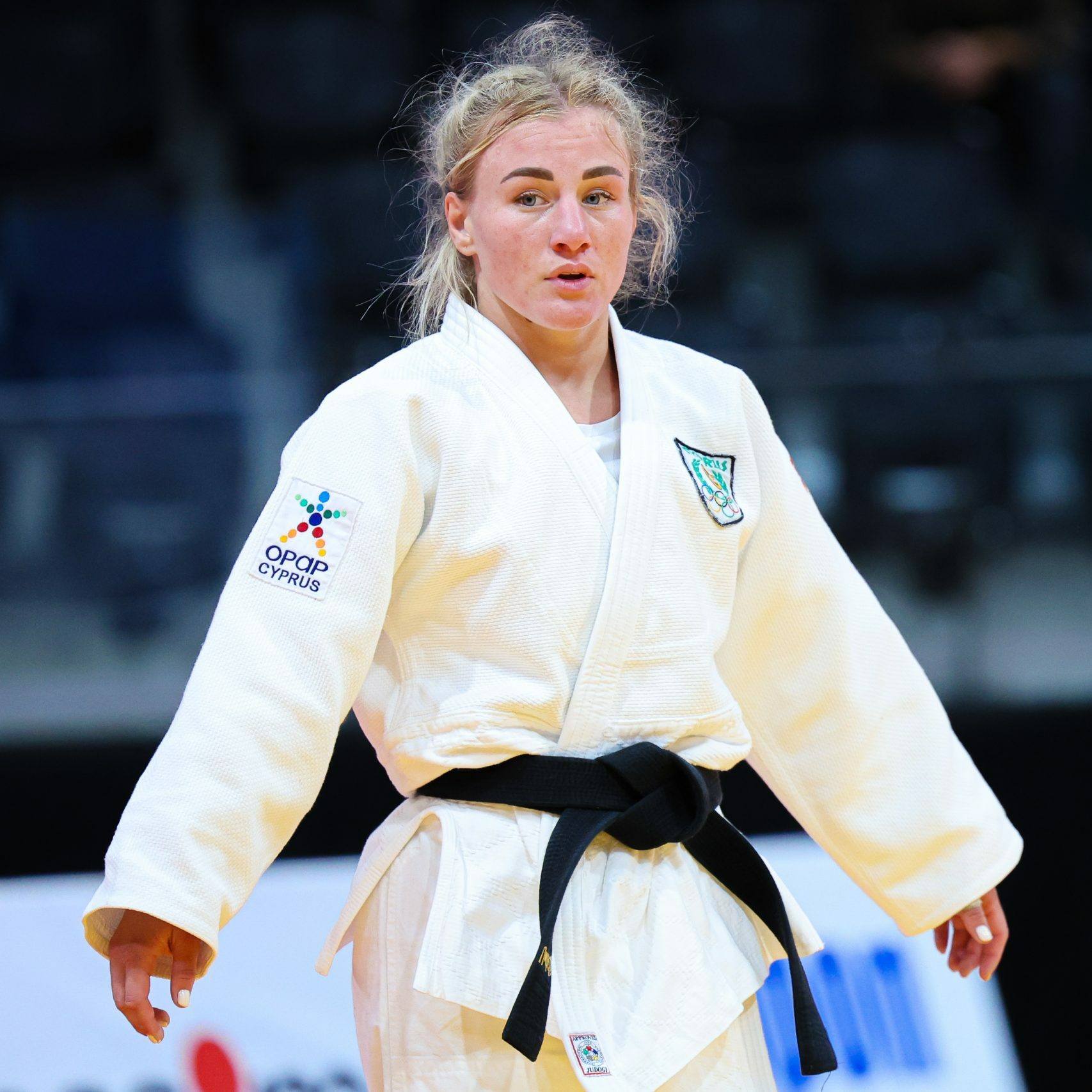
Sofia Asvesta won the bronze medal in the women's 52 kg event

Athlete	Event	Round of 16	Quarterfinals	Semifinals	Repechage	Final/BM	
Athlete	Event	Opposition Result	Opposition Result	Opposition Result	Opposition Result	Opposition Result	Rank
Sofia Asvesta	52 kg	Bye	Matia (CMR); W 100s1–001	Keen (ENG); W 001–000	Bye	Beaton (CAN); L 000–001	2nd place, silver medalist(s)
Janet Michaelidou	78 kg	Bye	Djengue Moune (CMR); W 101s1–000s2	Reid (ENG); L 000–110	Bye	Ludford (ENG); W 001s2–000	3rd place, bronze medalist(s)

== Swimming ==
Cyprus entered six swimmers, four men and two women.

Athlete	Event	Heat		Semifinal		Final	
Athlete	Event	Time	Rank	Time	Rank	Time	Rank
Filippos Iakovidis	Men's 50 m freestyle	24.48	45	Did not advance			
Filippos Iakovidis	Men's 50 m backstroke	26.61	20	Did not advance			
Alexandros Grigoriou	Men's 50 m breaststroke	28.77	24	Did not advance			
Markos Iakovidis	Men's 50 m breaststroke	28.58	20	Did not advance			
Panayiotis Panaretos	Men's 50 m breaststroke	28.55	19	Did not advance			
Alexandros Grigoriou	Men's 100 m breaststroke	1:03.84	20	Did not advance			
Panayiotis Panaretos	Men's 100 m breaststroke	1:05.21	26	Did not advance			
Alexandros Grigoriou	Men's 200 m breaststroke	2:19.74	9 R	—N/a		Did not advance	
Markos Iakovidis	Men's 50 m butterfly	24.98	30	Did not advance			
Anna Hadjiloizou	Women's 50 m freestyle	26.36	22	Did not advance			
Anna Hadjiloizou	Women's 100 m freestyle	57.08	24	Did not advance			
Maria Erokhina	Women's 50 m breaststroke	31.98	12 Q	31.91	11	Did not advance	
Maria Erokhina	Women's 100 m breaststroke	1:10.70	16 Q	1:09.44	13	Did not advance	
Maria Erokhina	Women's 200 m breaststroke	2:31.31	9 R	—N/a		Did not advance	
Maria Erokhina	Women's 200 m individual medley	2:24.32	12	—N/a		Did not advance	

== Weightlifting ==
Cyprus qualified two weightlifters (one per gender).

	Event	Snatch (kg)		Clean & Jerk (kg)		Total (kg)	Rank
	Event	Result	Rank	Result	Rank	Total (kg)	Rank
Dimitris Minasidis	Men's 65 kg	DNS					
Dimitra Ioannou	Women's 58 kg	70	9	90	9	160	9

=== Para powerlifting ===
Cyprus qualified one female powerlifter.

Athlete	Event	Result	Rank
Maria Markou	Women's heavyweight	89.4	8
