= Swimming at the 2026 Commonwealth Games – Men's 200 metre breaststroke =

Men's 200 metre breaststroke at the 2026 Commonwealth Games
- Venue: Tollcross International Swimming Centre
- Dates: 28 July

Medalists
gold medal	Filip Nowacki	Jersey
silver medal	Oliver Dawson	Canada
bronze medal	Zac Stubblety-Cook	Australia

The men's 200 metre breaststroke event at the 2026 Commonwealth Games will be held on 28 July at the Tollcross International Swimming Centre.

== Schedule ==
The schedule is as follows:

All times are British Summer Time (UTC+1)

Date	Time	Round
Tuesday 28 July 2026	10:30	Heats
Tuesday 28 July 2026	19:00	Final

== Results ==
=== Heats ===
The heats were held on the morning of 28 July 2026.

Heat results
Rank	Heat	Lane	Swimmer	Nation	Time	Notes
1	1	4	Oliver Dawson	Canada	2:10.05	Q
2	3	4	Filip Nowacki	Jersey	2:10.46	Q
3	3	5	Gregory Butler	England	2:10.73	Q
4	2	4	Zac Stubblety-Cook	Australia	2:11.07	Q
5	2	5	Bailey Lello	Australia	2:11.65	Q
6	3	3	Joshua Mitchell	Scotland	2:13.35	Q
7	1	5	George Smith	Scotland	2:14.68	Q
8	2	3	Jacob Story	Cook Islands	2:15.05	Q
9	3	6	Alexandros Grigoriou	Cyprus	2:19.74	R
10	2	6	Emmanuel Gadson	Bahamas	2:20.56	R
11	3	2	Hans Li Ying Pin	Mauritius	2:20.76	
12	1	2	Christian Toia	Samoa	2:24.01	
13	1	6	Charlie-Joe Hallett	Guernsey	2:26.55	
14	3	7	Jose Canjulo	Namibia	2:26.68	
15	2	2	Jordan Ssamula	Uganda	2:35.58	
16	1	7	Don Younger	Fiji	2:39.77	
17	2	7	Looth Mohamed Hussain	Maldives	2:42.93	
-	1	3	Max Morgan	England		DNS
-	3	1	Zackary Gresham	Grenada		DNS

=== Final ===
The final took place during of the evening of 28 July 2026.

Final results
Rank	Lane	Swimmer	Nation	Time	Notes
1st place, gold medalist(s)	5	Filip Nowacki	Jersey	2:07.87	
2nd place, silver medalist(s)	4	Oliver Dawson	Canada	2:08.39	NR
3rd place, bronze medalist(s)	6	Zac Stubblety-Cook	Australia	2:08.91	
4	3	Gregory Butler	England	2:09.81	
5	2	Bailey Lello	Australia	2:10.90	
6	7	Joshua Mitchell	Scotland	2:12.87	
7	1	George Smith	Scotland	2:14.05	
8	8	Jacob Story	Cook Islands	2:14.48	
