= Judo at the 2026 Commonwealth Games – Men's 100 kg =

Judo competition

Judo – Men's 100 kg at the 2026 Commonwealth Games
- Venue: SEC Centre, Glasgow
- Date: August 2 2026
- Competitors: 13

Medalists
gold medal	Kyle Reyes	Canada
silver medal	Max Gregory	England
bronze medal	Georgios Kroussaniotakis	Cyprus
bronze medal	Franck Tahman Zan	Cameroon

The Men's 100 kg judo competitions at the 2026 Commonwealth Games in Glasgow, Scotland will place on August 2 at the SEC Centre. Thirteen judoka will take part in this class.

== Seedings ==
The following judoka were seeded in advance of the draw:

Men's 100 kg
Seed	Judoka	Nation
1	Oliver Barrett	Wales
2	Kyle Reyes	Canada
3	Franck Tahman Zan	Cameroon
4	Max Gregory	England
5	Matthew Rowley	New Zealand
6	Georgios Kroussaniotakis	Cyprus
7	Abdourahman Ceesay	The Gambia
8	Aristos Michael	Cyprus

== Results ==
=== Gold final path ===
Round of 16
Aristos Michael (CYP)	100
Avtar Singh (IND)	000 (yellow card)
Matthew Rowley (NZL)	010 (yellow card)
Jaden Calder (SCO)	000 (yellow card)
Abdourahman Ceesay (GAM)	100
Charles Mwangushya (UGA)	000
Georgios Kroussaniotakis (CYP)	101
Lucas David (MRI)	000

Quarterfinals
Oliver Barratt (WAL)	100
Aristos Michael (CYP)	000 (yellow card)
Max Gregory (ENG)	100
Matthew Rowley (NZL)	000
Kyle Reyes (CAN)	101 (yellow card)
Abdourahman Ceesay (GAM)	000
Franck Tahman Zan (CMR)	002
Georgios Kroussaniotakis (CYP)	100 (yellow card)

Semifinal
Oliver Barratt (WAL)	000
Max Gregory (ENG)	100 (yellow card)
Kyle Reyes (CAN)	100
Georgios Kroussaniotakis (CYP)	000

Gold medal final
Max Gregory (ENG)	000
Kyle Reyes (CAN)	100

=== Repechage/bronze medal path ===
Competitors eliminated in the quarter finals enter the repechage preliminaries to contest for the bronze medals. The winners of those face the losing semi finalists from the opposite half of the main draw for the bronze medals.

Repechage
Aristos Michael (CYP)	101
Matthew Rowley (NZL)	000
Abdourahman Ceesay (GAM)	000
Franck Tahman Zan (CMR)	100

Bronze medal
Aristos Michael (CYP)	000
Georgios Kroussaniotakis (CYP)	100
Franck Tahman Zan (CMR)	100 (yellow card)
Oliver Barratt (WAL)	001 (yellow card)
