= Judo at the 2026 Commonwealth Games – Men's +100 kg =

Judo competition

Judo – Men's +100 kg at the 2026 Commonwealth Games
- Venue: SEC Centre, Glasgow
- Date: August 2, 2026
- Competitors: 13

Medalists
gold medal	Giannis Antoniou	Cyprus
silver medal	Kayhan Ozcicek-Takagi	Australia
bronze medal	Kody Andrews	New Zealand
bronze medal	Paula Monta	Tonga

The Men's +100 kg judo competitions at the 2026 Commonwealth Games in Glasgow, Scotland will place on August 2 at the SEC Centre. Thirteen judoka will take part in this class.

== Seedings ==
The following judoka were seeded in advance of the draw:

+100
Seed	Judoka	Nation
1	Kayhan Ozcicek-Takagi	Australia
2	Giannis Antoniou	Cyprus
3	Kody Andrews	New Zealand
4	John Messe	Canada
5	Gerard Takayara	Fiji
6	Monta Paula	Tonga
7	Joshua Whitehouse	Wales
8	Wesley Greenidge	England

== Results ==
=== Gold final path ===
Round of 16
Wesley Greenidge (ENG)	000 (yellow card)
Gregor Miller (SCO)	100
John Messe A Bessong (CAN)	100
Shah Hussain Shah (PAK)	000
Gerard Takayawa (FIJ)	101 (yellow card)
Adam Hall (NIR)	000
Joshua Whitehouse (WAL)	001
Yash Ghangas (IND)	000
Kody Andrews (NZL)	101 (yellow card)
Steven Moore (JAM)	000 (yellow card)
Paula Monta (TGA)	100 (yellow card)
Alexander Quilindo (SEY)	000

Quarterfinals
Kayhan Ozcicek-Takagi (AUS)	010
Gregor Miller (SCO)	000
John Messe A Bessong (CAN)	100
Gerard Takayawa (FIJ)	000
Giannis Antoniou (CYP)	100
Joshua Whitehouse (WAL)	000
Kody Andrews (NZL)	101 (yellow card)
Paula Monta (TGA)	000

Semifinal
Kayhan Ozcicek-Takagi (AUS)	100
John Messe A Bessong (CAN)	000
Giannis Antoniou (CYP)	100
Kody Andrews (NZL)	000

Gold medal final
Kayhan Ozcicek-Takagi (AUS)	000
Giannis Antoniou (CYP)	010 (yellow card)

=== Repechage/bronze medal path ===
Competitors who are eliminated in the quarter finals enter the repechage preliminary round to contest for the bronze medals. The winners of that round then face the losing semi finalists in the bronze medal finals.

Repechage
Gregor Miller (SCO)	010
Gerard Takayawa (FIJ)	001 (yellow card)
Joshua Whitehouse (WAL)	001 (yellow card)
Paula Monta (TGA)	100

Bronze medal
Gregor Miller (SCO)	000
Kody Andrews (NZL)	001 (yellow card)
Paula Monta (TGA)	012 (yellow card)
John Messe A Bessong (CAN)	011 (yellow card)
