= Athletics at the 2026 Commonwealth Games – Men's hammer throw =

Men's hammer throw at the 2026 Commonwealth Games
- Venue: Scotstoun Stadium, Glasgow
- Dates: 27 July (final)
- Competitors: 8 from 6 nations
- Winning distance: 80.97 GR

Medalists
| gold medal | Ethan Katzberg | Canada |
| silver medal | Iosif Kesidis | Cyprus |
| bronze medal | Rowan Hamilton | Canada |

The men's hammer throw at the 2026 Commonwealth Games, as part of the athletics programme, took place in the Scotstoun Stadium on 27 July 2026, and was a straight final

== Records ==
Prior to this competition, the existing world, Commonwealth and Commonwealth Games records were as follows:

Men's Hammer throw
| World record | 86.74 m | Yuriy Sedykh (URS) | 30 Aug 1986 | Stuttgart, West Germany |
| Commonwealth record | 84.70 m | Ethan Katzberg (CAN) | 16 Sep 2025 | Tokyo, Japan |
| Games record | 80.26 m | Nick Miller (ENG) | 8 Apr 2018 | Gold Coast, Australia |

== Schedule ==
The schedule is as follows:

| Date | Time | Round |
|---|---|---|
| 27 July 2026 | 10:00 | Final |

All times are British Summer Time (UTC+1)

== Results ==
=== Final ===
The final was scheduled for 27 July 2026. It was a stand alone final

| Rank | Name | 1 | 2 | 3 | 4 | 5 | 6 | Result | Notes |
|---|---|---|---|---|---|---|---|---|---|
| 1st place, gold medalist(s) | Ethan Katzberg (CAN) | 80.97 | 80.52 | x | x | 80.94 | 80.37 | 80.97 | GR |
| 2nd place, silver medalist(s) | Iosif Kesidis (CYP) | x | 72.65 | 74.78 | 75.79 | 76.97 | 72.91 | 76.97 | |
| 3rd place, bronze medalist(s) | Rowan Hamilton (CAN) | 72.94 | x | x | x | x | 75.36 | 75.36 | |
| 4 | Jake Norris (ENG) | 65.31 | 69.56 | 71.66 | x | 71.49 | x | 71.66 | |
| 5 | Chris Bennett (SCO) | 67.17 | 65.78 | 69.48 | 68.22 | 68.69 | x | 69.48 | PB |
| 6 | Anthony Barmes (NZL) | 64.96 | 67.49 | 66.03 | 66.59 | x | 67.00 | 67.49 | |
| 7 | Alexandros Poursanidis (CYP) | 64.66 | 66.79 | x | x | x | 65.99 | 66.79 | |
| 8 | Dominic Ongidi Abunda (KEN) | 58.51 | 59.01 | 59.82 | 59.98 | 60.47 | 60.87 | 60.87 | |
