= Artistic gymnastics at the 2026 Commonwealth Games – Men's vault =

Men's vault at the 2026 Commonwealth Games
- Venue: SEC Hydro
- Dates: 24 July 2026 (qualification); 28 July 2026 (final)
- Competitors: 8
- Winning score: 13.766

Medalists
gold medal	Félix Dolci	Canada
silver medal	Luke Whitehouse	England
bronze medal	Neofytos Kyriakou	Cyprus

The Men's vault gymnastics competition at the 2026 Commonwealth Games in Glasgow, Scotland was held on 28 July 2026 at SEC Hydro.

== Schedule ==
The schedule was as follows:

All times are British Summer Time (UTC+1)

Date	Time	Round
Friday 24 July 2026	09:08	Qualification
Tuesday 28 July 2026	13:05	Final

== Results ==
=== Qualification ===
Qualification for this apparatus final was determined within the team final. The results are as follows:

Rank	Gymnast	Nation	Vaults				Total	Notes
Rank	Gymnast	Nation	Difficulty	Execution	Penalty	Total	Total	Notes
1	Félix Dolci	Canada	4.800	9.200		14.000	14.100	Q
1	Félix Dolci	Canada	5.200	9.000		14.200	14.100	Q
2	Luke Whitehouse	England	5.200	8.950		14.150	14.000	Q
2	Luke Whitehouse	England	4.800	9.050		13.850	14.000	Q
3	James Hardy	Australia	4.800	9.050	-0.100	13.750	13.755	Q
3	James Hardy	Australia	4.800	9.000		13.800	13.755	Q
4	Muhammad Sharul Aimy	Malaysia	4.800	8.950		13.750	13.725	Q
4	Muhammad Sharul Aimy	Malaysia	4.800	8.900		13.700	13.725	Q
5	Ewan Mcateer	Northern Ireland	4.800	8.950		13.750	13.650	Q
5	Ewan Mcateer	Northern Ireland	4.400	9.150		13.550	13.650	Q
6	Neofytos Kyriakou	Cyprus	4.800	9.050		13.850	13.625	Q
6	Neofytos Kyriakou	Cyprus	4.400	9.000		13.400	13.625	Q
7	Kyriakos Markidis	Cyprus	4.800	9.050		13.850	13.500	Q
7	Kyriakos Markidis	Cyprus	4.400	8.750		13.150	13.500	Q
8	Clayton Bell	Jamaica	4.400	9.000	-0.100	13.300	13.300	Q
8	Clayton Bell	Jamaica	4.400	8.900		13.300	13.300	Q
9	Henry Lewis	Wales	5.200	7.800	-0.100	12.900	13.150	R1
9	Henry Lewis	Wales	4.800	8.600		13.400	13.150	R1
10	Yogeshwar Singh	India	4.800	8.300	-0.100	13.000	12.700	R2
10	Yogeshwar Singh	India	4.800	7.600		12.400	12.700	R2
11	Connor Sullivan	Scotland	4.800	7.700	-0.100	12.400	12.525	R3
11	Connor Sullivan	Scotland	4.800	7.850		12.650	12.525	R3
12	Tapeswaranath Das	India	4.400	7.650	-0.300	11.750	12.075	
12	Tapeswaranath Das	India	4.800	7.700	-0.100	12.400	12.075	
13	Daniel McLean	South Africa	4.400	7.900	-0.100	12.200	12.000	
13	Daniel McLean	South Africa	2.400	9.400		11.800	12.000	

=== Final ===
The results are as follows:

Rank	Gymnast	Nation	Vaults				Total
Rank	Gymnast	Nation	Difficulty	Execution	Penalty	Total	Total
1st place, gold medalist(s)	Félix Dolci	Canada	4.800	9.100		13.900	13.766
1st place, gold medalist(s)	Félix Dolci	Canada	5.200	8.533	-0.100	13.633	13.766
2nd place, silver medalist(s)	Luke Whitehouse	England	5.200	8.566		13.766	13.749
2nd place, silver medalist(s)	Luke Whitehouse	England	4.800	8.933		13.733	13.749
3rd place, bronze medalist(s)	Neofytos Kyriakou	Cyprus	4.800	9.300		14.100	13.733
3rd place, bronze medalist(s)	Neofytos Kyriakou	Cyprus	4.400	8.966		13.366	13.733
4	Muhammad Sharul Aimy	Malaysia	4.800	8.833		13.633	13.733
4	Muhammad Sharul Aimy	Malaysia	4.800	9.033		13.833	13.733
5	James Hardy	Australia	4.800	8.866	-0.100	13.566	13.566
5	James Hardy	Australia	4.800	8.766		13.566	13.566
6	Clayton Bell	Jamaica	4.400	8.900		13.300	12.916
6	Clayton Bell	Jamaica	4.400	8.433	-0.300	12.533	12.916
7	Ewan Mcateer	Northern Ireland	4.800	8.200	-0.300	12.700	12.750
7	Ewan Mcateer	Northern Ireland	4.400	8.500	-0.100	12.800	12.750
8	Kyriakos Markidis	Cyprus	4.800	8.833	-0.100	13.533	12.650
8	Kyriakos Markidis	Cyprus	4.400	7.666	-0.300	11.766	12.650
