= Artistic gymnastics at the 2026 Commonwealth Games – Men's parallel bars =

Men's parallel bars at the 2026 Commonwealth Games
- Venue: SEC Hydro
- Dates: 24 July 2026 (qualification); 28 July 2026 (final)
- Competitors: 8
- Winning score: 14.000

Medalists
gold medal	Jesse Moore	Australia
silver medal	Marios Georgiou	Cyprus
bronze medal	Félix Dolci	Canada

The Men's parallel bars gymnastics competition at the 2026 Commonwealth Games in Glasgow, Scotland was held on 28 July 2026 at SEC Hydro.

== Schedule ==
The schedule was as follows:

All times are British Summer Time (UTC+1)

Date	Time	Round
Friday 24 July 2026	09:08	Qualification
Tuesday 28 July 2026	14:50	Final

== Results ==
=== Qualification ===
Qualification for this apparatus final was determined within the team final.

Rank	Gymnast	Country	Difficulty	Execution	Penalty	Bonus	Total	Notes
1	Alexander Yolshin-Cash	England	5.300	8.800			14.100	Q
2	Marios Georgiou	Cyprus	5.000	8.800			13.800	Q
3	Adam Tobin	England	5.200	8.500		0.100	13.800	Q
4	William Émard	Canada	5.000	8.650			13.650	Q
5	Elliot Vernon	Wales	5.100	8.550			13.650	Q
6	Félix Dolci	Canada	5.300	8.150		0.100	13.550	Q
7	Reuben Ward	Scotland	4.800	8.700			13.500	Q
8	Jesse Moore	Australia	5.100	8.400			13.500	Q
9	Georgios Angonas	Cyprus	4.700	8.500			13.200	R1
10	Alexander Niscoveanu	Wales	4.900	8.250			13.150	R2
11	René Cournoyer	Canada	5.400	7.750			13.150	–
12	Hamish Carter	Scotland	4.800	8.300			13.100	R3
13	Cameron Lynn	Scotland	5.000	8.350	-0.300		13.050	
14	Luke Whitehouse	England	5.300	7.900	-0.300		12.900	
15	James Hardy	Australia	4.000	8.850			12.850	
16	Chun Chen Ng	Malaysia	5.200	7.650			12.850	
17	Yogeshwar Singh	India	4.100	8.550		0.100	12.750	
18	Benjamin Foster	Australia	4.300	8.450			12.750	
19	Jovi Loh	Singapore	4.700	8.050			12.750	
20	Tapan Mohanty	India	4.100	8.600			12.700	
21	Joseph Cemlyn-Jones	Wales	5.000	7.600			12.600	
22	Gabriel Langton	England	5.400	7.200			12.600	
23	Pavel Karnejenko	Scotland	4.300	7.800			12.100	
24	Ritam Malik	Australia	4.300	7.650			11.950	
25	Kyriakos Markidis	Cyprus	3.700	8.150			11.850	
26	Clayton Bell	Jamaica	4.500	7.200			11.700	
27	Alexander Istock	New Zealand	4.300	7.300			11.600	
27	Jacob Edwards	Wales	4.300	7.300			11.600	
29	Justin Spencer	Cayman Islands	2.400	8.950		0.100	11.450	
30	Ethan Ikeda	Canada	4.100	7.200			11.300	
31	Daniel Stoddart	New Zealand	3.600	7.600			11.200	
32	Neofytos Kyriakou	Cyprus	3.100	8.050			11.150	
33	Chane Cumbermack	Trinidad and Tobago	4.000	7.300	-0.300		11.000	
34	Mikhail Koudinov	New Zealand	4.200	6.800			11.000	
35	Harry Eyres	Isle of Man	2.800	8.150			10.950	
36	Asher Pua	Singapore	2.500	8.150			10.650	
37	Abu Saeed Rafi	Bangladesh	1.900	8.100			10.000	
38	Tapeswaranath Das	India	4.100	5.900			10.000	
39	Rajib Chakma	Bangladesh	3.500	6.350	-0.300		9.550	
40	Shishir Ahmed	Bangladesh	1.900	7.400			9.300	
41	Shahzad Ali	Pakistan	2.100	6.200			8.300	
42	Daniel McLean	South Africa	3.200	4.650			7.850	
43	Barr Abdul	Singapore	2.600	5.950	-3.000		5.550	

=== Final ===
The results are as follows:

Rank	Gymnast	Country	Difficulty	Execution	Penalty	Total	Notes
1st place, gold medalist(s)	Jesse Moore	Australia	5.100	8.900			14.000
2nd place, silver medalist(s)	Marios Georgiou	Cyprus	5.400	8.400			13.800
3rd place, bronze medalist(s)	Félix Dolci	Canada	5.300	7.900			13.300
4	William Émard	Canada	5.200	8.200			13.200
5	Reuben Ward	Scotland	4.800	8.366			13.166
6	Adam Tobin	England	5.200	7.833			13.033
7	Elliot Vernon	Wales	5.100	7.600			12.700
8	Alexander Yolshin-Cash	England	5.300	7.400			12.700
