= Artistic gymnastics at the 2026 Commonwealth Games – Men's horizontal bar =

Men's horizontal bar at the 2026 Commonwealth Games
- Venue: SEC Hydro
- Dates: 24 July 2026 (qualification); 28 July 2026 (final)
- Competitors: 8
- Winning score: 14.233

Medalists
gold medal	Félix Dolci	Canada
silver medal	Marios Georgiou	Cyprus
bronze medal	William Émard	Canada

The Men's horizontal bar gymnastics competition at the 2026 Commonwealth Games in Glasgow, Scotland was held on 28 July 2026 at SEC Hydro.

== Schedule ==
The schedule was as follows:

All times are British Summer Time (UTC+1)

Date	Time	Round
Friday 24 July 2026	09:08	Qualification
Tuesday 28 July 2026	16:20	Final

== Results ==
=== Qualification ===
Qualification for this apparatus final was determined within the team final.

Rank	Name	CGA	Difficulty	Execution	Penalty	Bonus	Total	Notes
1	Félix Dolci	Canada	5.800	8.450			14.250	Q
2	Marios Georgiou	Cyprus	5.200	8.550			13.750	Q
3	William Émard	Canada	4.600	8.800		0.100	13.500	Q
4	Cameron Lynn	Scotland	5.300	8.100		0.100	13.500	Q
5	Ritam Malik	Australia	4.700	8.650		0.100	13.450	Q
6	Alexander Yolshin-Cash	England	4.800	8.450			13.250	Q
7	Alexander Istock	New Zealand	4.400	8.800			13.200	Q
8	Alexander Niscoveanu	Wales	4.600	8.500		0.100	13.200	Q
9	Reuben Ward	Scotland	5.200	7.950			13.150	R1
10	Adam Tobin	England	5.200	7.900			13.100	R2
11	Hamish Carter	Scotland	4.300	8.500		0.100	12.900	–
12	Elliot Vernon	Wales	4.700	8.000			12.700	R3
13	Yogeshwar Singh	India	4.400	8.250			12.650	
14	Jesse Moore	Australia	5.400	7.250			12.650	
15	Daniel Stoddart	New Zealand	4.200	8.300			12.500	
16	Connor Sullivan	Scotland	4.400	8.000			12.400	
17	James Hardy	Australia	4.100	8.250			12.350	
18	Neofytos Kyriakou	Cyprus	4.700	7.550			12.250	
19	Chane Cumbermack	Trinidad and Tobago	4.000	8.050			12.050	
20	Jacob Edwards	Wales	3.600	8.300			11.900	
21	Georgios Angonas	Cyprus	4.700	7.200			11.900	
22	Tapan Mohanty	India	3.000	8.700			11.700	
23	Luke Whitehouse	England	4.200	7.500			11.700	
24	René Cournoyer	Canada	4.900	6.650			11.550	
25	Joseph Cemlyn-Jones	Wales	4.000	7.500			11.500	
26	Tapeswaranath Das	India	3.200	8.250			11.450	
27	Jovi Loh	Singapore	4.800	6.550			11.350	
28	Barr Abdul	Singapore	3.800	7.450			11.250	
29	Benjamin Foster	Australia	3.600	7.500			11.100	
29	Clayton Bell	Jamaica	3.600	7.500			11.100	
31	Ethan Ikeda	Canada	4.800	6.150			10.950	
32	Asher Pua	Singapore	4.100	6.550			10.650	
33	Justin Spencer	Cayman Islands	2.100	8.550	-0.300		10.350	
34	Kyriakos Markidis	Cyprus	3.400	6.950			10.350	
35	Harry Eyres	Isle of Man	2.400	7.700			10.100	
36	Daniel McLean	South Africa	3.100	6.850			9.950	
37	Abu Saeed Rafi	Bangladesh	1.700	7.750			9.450	
38	Mikhail Koudinov	New Zealand	2.500	7.000	-0.300		9.200	
39	Rajib Chakma	Bangladesh	3.200	5.700	-0.300		8.600	
40	Shishir Ahmed	Bangladesh	1.600	5.900			7.500	
41	Gabriel Langton	England	0.700	8.650	-6.000		3.350	

=== Final ===
The results are as follows:

Rank	Gymnast	Country	Difficulty	Execution	Penalty	Total
1st place, gold medalist(s)	Félix Dolci	Canada	5.800	8.433		14.233
2nd place, silver medalist(s)	Marios Georgiou	Cyprus	5.200	8.866		14.166
3rd place, bronze medalist(s)	William Émard	Canada	4.800	8.766		13.566
4	Alexander Yolshin-Cash	England	4.700	8.533		13.233
5	Cameron Lynn	Scotland	5.300	7.833		13.133
6	Ritam Malik	Australia	4.700	8.133		12.833
7	Alexander Niscoveanu	Wales	4.500	7.166		11.666
8	Alexander Istock	New Zealand	3.100	5.100		8.200
