= Félix Dolci =

Canadian artistic gymnast

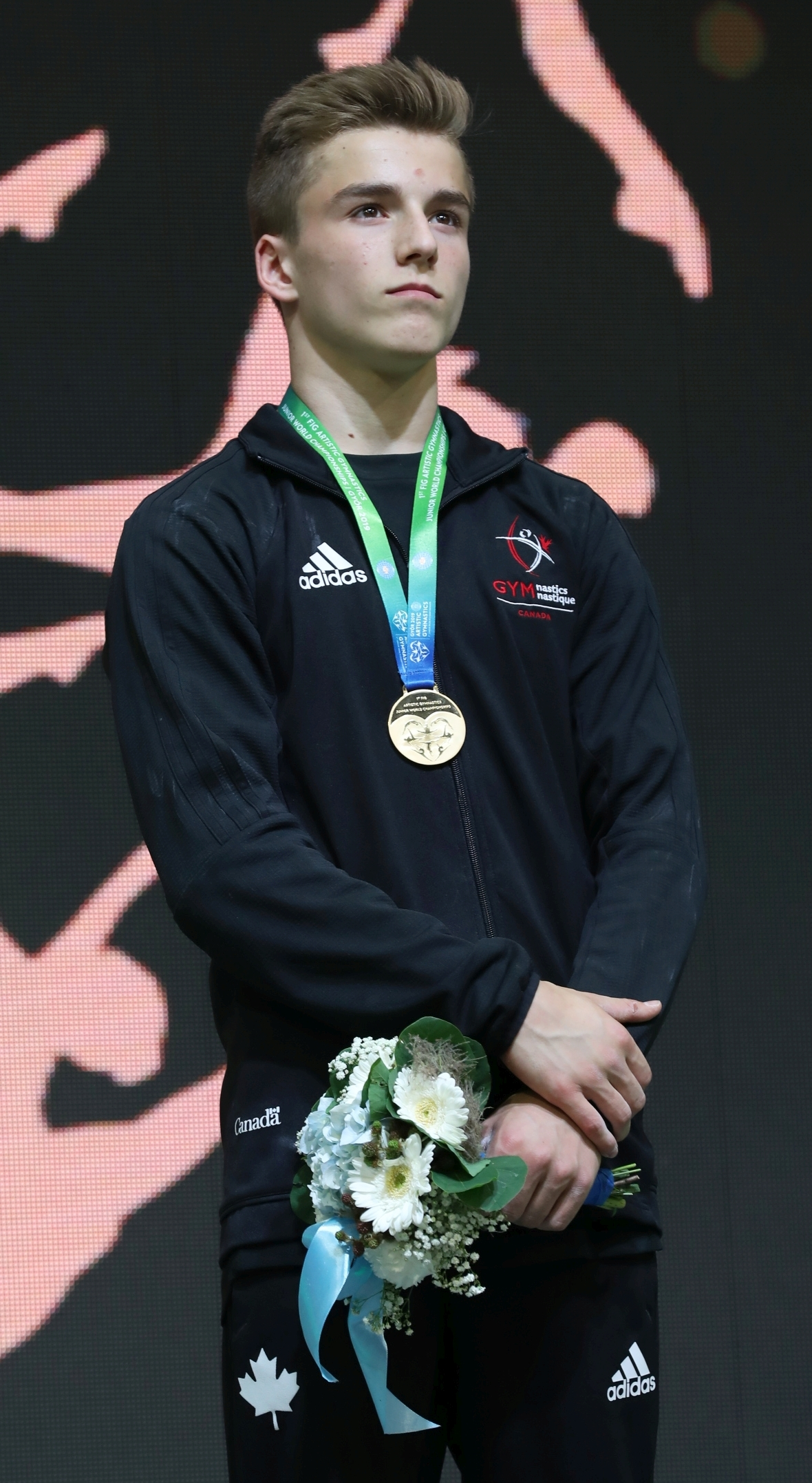
- Dolci at the 2019 Junior World Championships

Personal information
- Born: 5 May 2002 (age 24) Saint-Eustache, Quebec, Canada
- Height: 166 cm (5 ft 5 in)

Gymnastics career
- Discipline: Men's artistic gymnastics
- Country represented: Canada; (2017–present)
- Club: Laval Excellence
- Head coach: Adrian Balan
Medal record
Representing Canada
Men's artistic gymnastics
Commonwealth Games
Gold medal – first place	2026 Glasgow	Team
Gold medal – first place	2026 Glasgow	Rings
Gold medal – first place	2026 Glasgow	Vault
Gold medal – first place	2026 Glasgow	Horizontal bar
Silver medal – second place	2022 Birmingham	Team
Silver medal – second place	2022 Birmingham	Floor exercise
Silver medal – second place	2026 Glasgow	All-around
Bronze medal – third place	2026 Glasgow	Parallel bars
Pan American Games
Gold medal – first place	2023 Santiago	All-around
Gold medal – first place	2023 Santiago	Floor exercise
Silver medal – second place	2023 Santiago	Team
Bronze medal – third place	2023 Santiago	Rings
Bronze medal – third place	2023 Santiago	Vault
Pan American Championships
Gold medal – first place	2025 Panama City	All-around
Gold medal – first place	2025 Panama City	Vault
Gold medal – first place	2025 Panama City	Parallel bars
Gold medal – first place	2025 Panama City	Horizontal bar
Gold medal – first place	2026 Rio de Janeiro	Team
Silver medal – second place	2022 Rio de Janeiro	Vault
Silver medal – second place	2023 Medellín	Team
Silver medal – second place	2025 Panama City	Team
Bronze medal – third place	2022 Rio de Janeiro	Team
Bronze medal – third place	2022 Rio de Janeiro	All-around
Bronze medal – third place	2022 Rio de Janeiro	Floor exercise
Bronze medal – third place	2026 Rio de Janeiro	Rings
Bronze medal – third place	2026 Rio de Janeiro	Horizontal bar
World University Games
Gold medal – first place	2025 Rhine-Ruhr	Horizontal bar
Silver medal – second place	2025 Rhine-Ruhr	Team
Pacific Rim Championships
Silver medal – second place	2024 Cali	Team
Junior World Championships
Gold medal – first place	2019 Győr	Rings
Silver medal – second place	2019 Győr	Floor exercise
Youth Olympic Games
Silver medal – second place	2018 Buenos Aires	Rings
FIG World Cup
Event	1st	2nd	3rd
World Challenge Cup	1	1	2
Total	1	1	2

Félix Dolci (/ˈdɔːlsi/ DOL-see) (born 5 May 2002) is a Canadian male artistic gymnast. He represented Canada at the 2024 Summer Olympics. He is the 2023 Pan American Games all-around and floor exercise champion, the 2025 Pan American all-around champion, and the 2019 Junior World Champion on rings. He has been a member of the Canadian national team since 2017.

== Early life ==
Dolci was born in Saint-Eustache, Quebec in 2002. He started gymnastics at the age of 6 at Laval Excellence, a gym in Laval, Quebec. His first competition was in 2009. So far, he has won over 200 medals and awards, including sports merits and other honours. His parents initially tried to get him interested in hockey and soccer before enrolling him in gymnastics. Dolci speaks both French and English and resides in Quebec.

== Gymnastics career ==
=== 2018 ===
Dolci suffered a shoulder injury at the start of 2018, which made it difficult to do horizontal bar, pommel horse, and parallel bars. Because of this, he was not able to compete at his best at the Élite Canada competition in February and ended up in fourth place in the all-around. Dolci recovered, and in April he competed at the Pacific Rim Championships in Medellin, Colombia. He helped Canada place second as a team and individually he placed second on rings, fourth on parallel bars, and eighth on horizontal bar. He next competed at the Canadian Championships held in Waterloo, Ontario and placed first on all-around, floor, vault, and horizontal bar; second on rings; third on parallel bars; and fourth on pommel horse. Dolci's second international competition of the year came in June at the Junior Pan American Gymnastics Championships in Buenos Aires, Argentina. While there, he helped Canada win bronze as a team. Individually, he won gold on rings and bronze in the all-around, on floor exercise, and on horizontal bar.

In October, Dolci was back in Buenos Aires for the Youth Olympic Games. He placed second on rings, sixth on floor exercise, seventh on vault, eighth on horizontal bar, and ninth in the all-around. His silver made him the first Canadian gymnast to win a medal at the Youth Olympics (alongside Emma Spence who won a bronze medal on vault). He rounded out the year with the Austrian Future Cup in Linz, Austria in November. He dominated the competition, placing first on every event (including team and all-around) minus the horizontal bar, where he received the bronze medal.

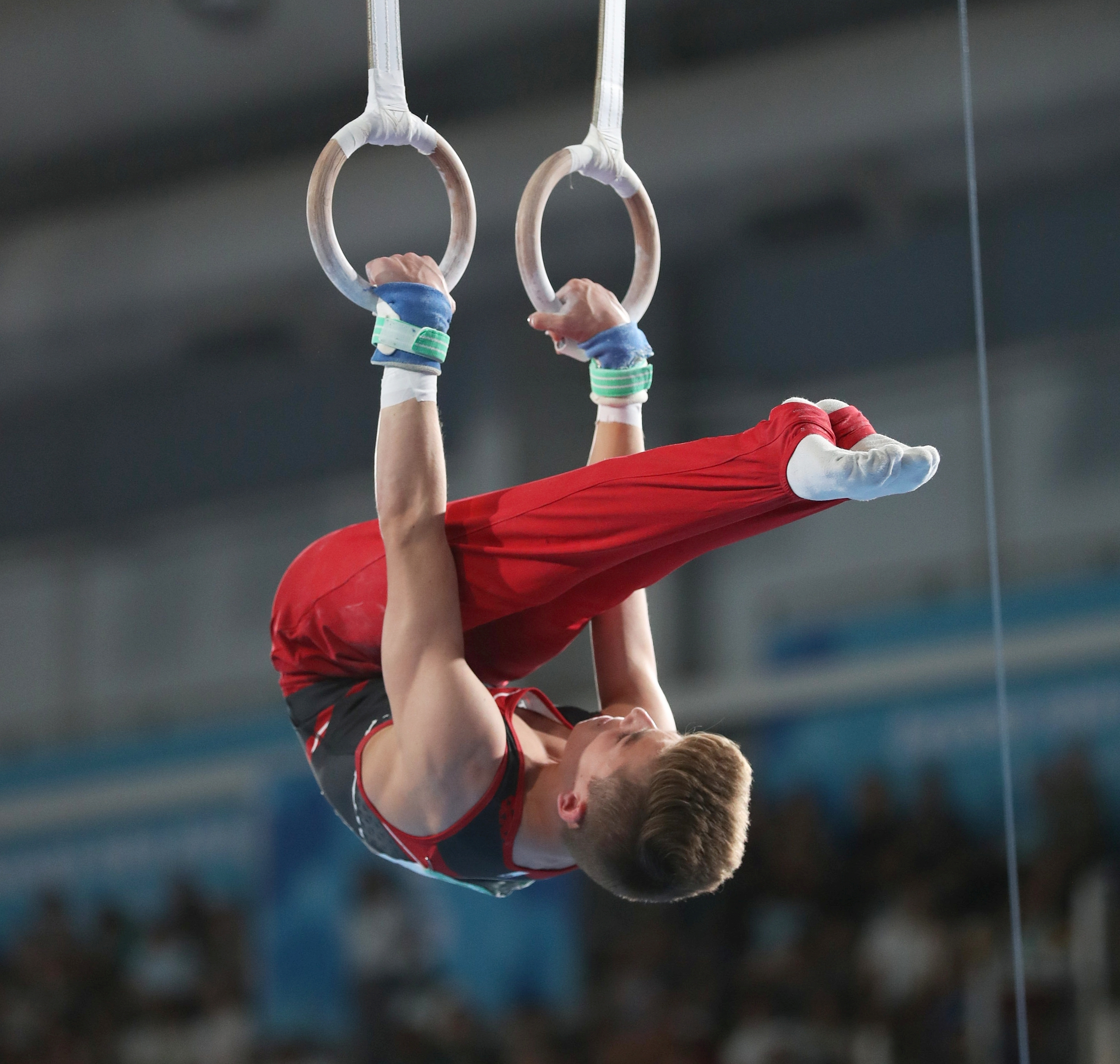
Rings

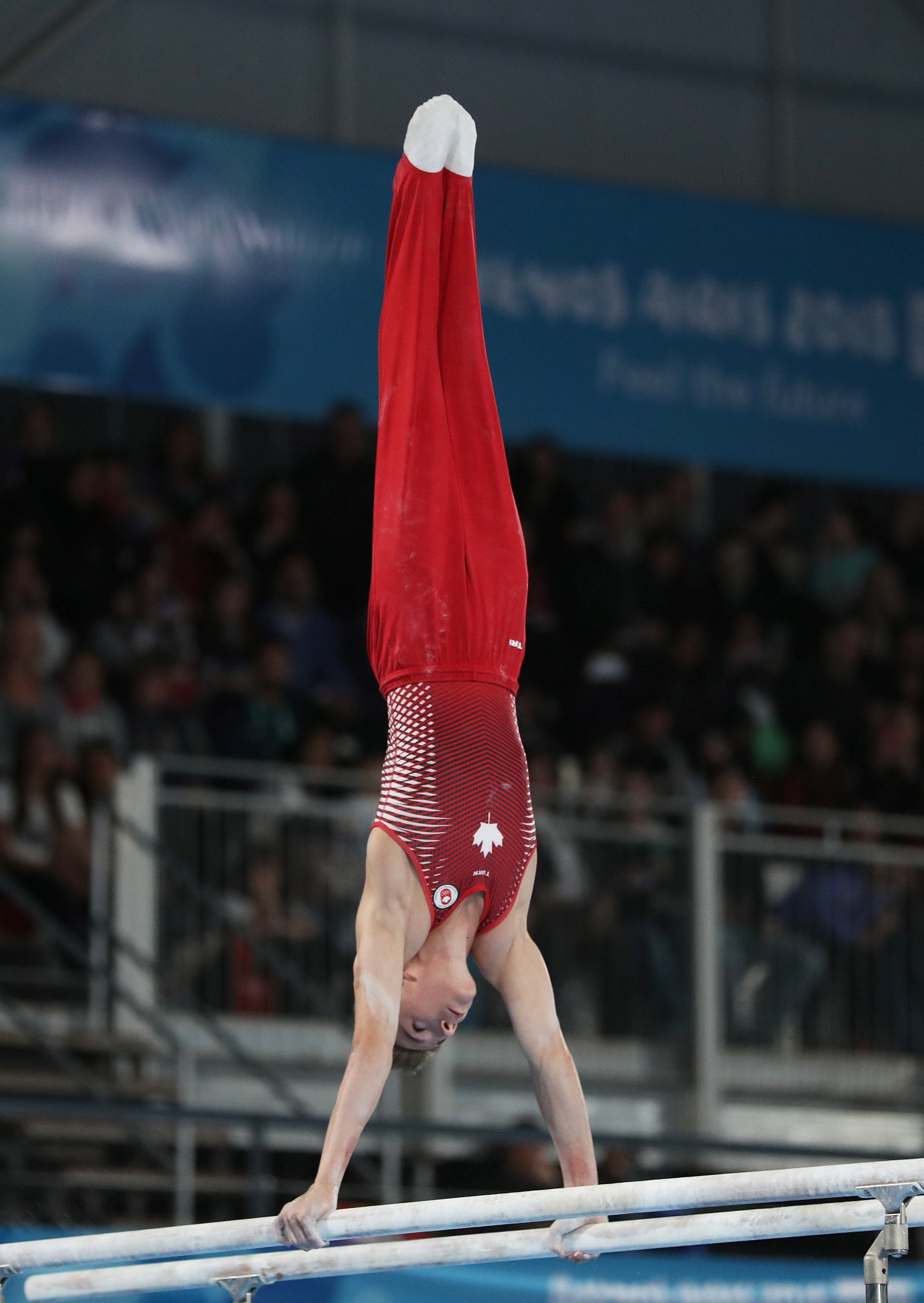
Parallel bars

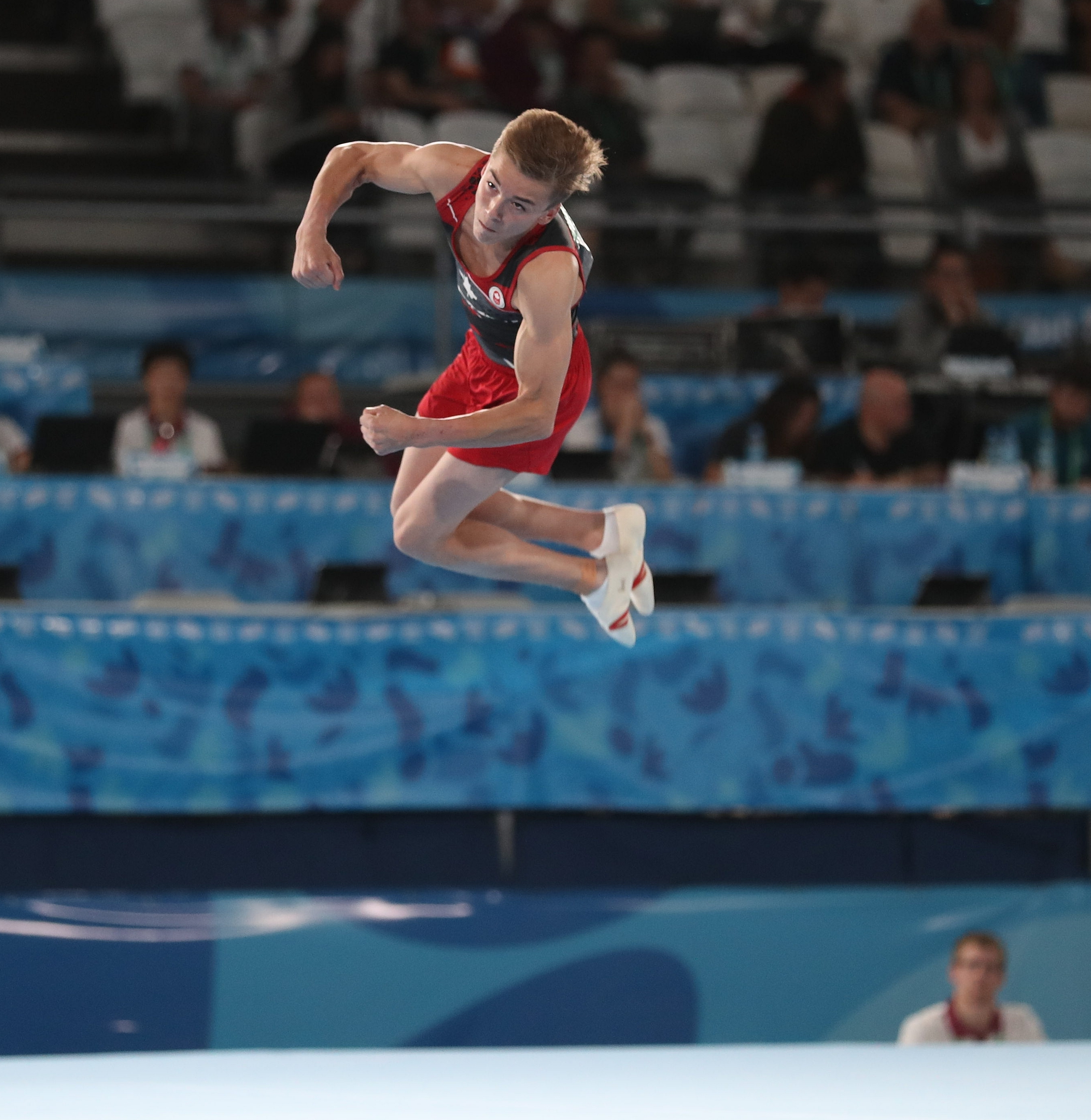
Floor exercise

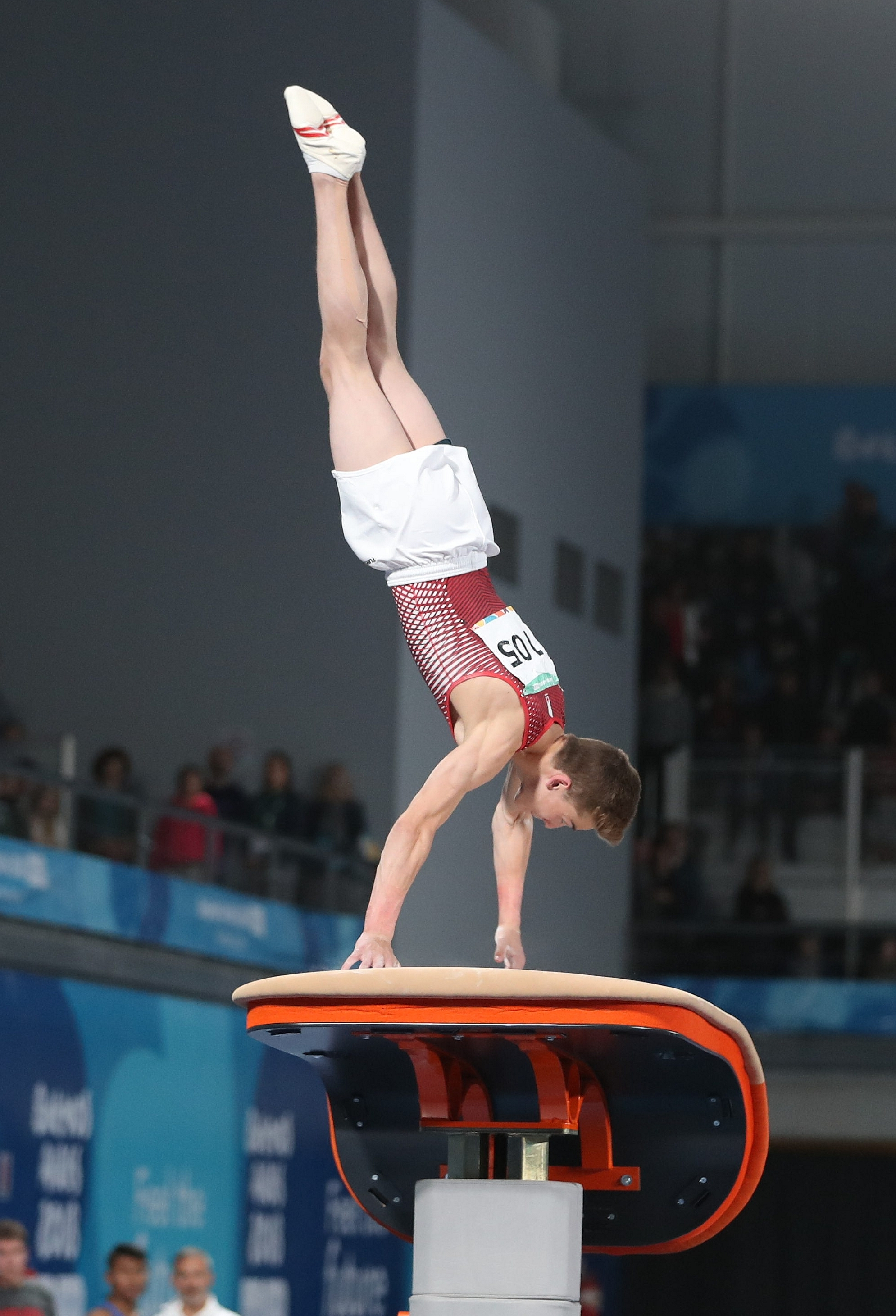
Vault

Dolci at the 2018 Youth Olympic Games

=== 2019 ===
Dolci started 2019 off in February with the Canada Games in Red Deer, Alberta. Competing in the junior competition, he won gold in all-around, high bar, vault, and floor; silver on rings and as part of the Québec team; and finished in 8th on pommel horse. This achievement made him the most decorated athlete in the Canada winter games history for a single year. Dolci then went to University of Calgary International Cup (UCIC) in Calgary, Alberta in March. He placed 1st on pommel horse, rings, and parallel bars, and got 6th on high bar. In May, he went to the Canadian Championships in Ottawa, Ontario. There he received the gold medal in all events excluding vault and pommel horse, where he placed 2nd and 4th, respectively.

At the end of June, Dolci went to Győr, Hungary to compete at the inaugural Junior World Championships. Along with Ioannis Chronopoulos and Evgeny Siminiuc, Dolci helped Canada place fifth as a team with a combined total of 158.563. Additionally, he placed fourth in the all-around behind Shinnosuke Oka, Ryosuke Doi, and Illia Kovtun. Dolci qualified for two event finals: floor exercise (in third) and rings (in second). Dolci finished second in the floor exercise final with a 14.000, only 0.166 behind Ryu Sung-hyun of South Korea. Later that day, he competed in the rings final and earned a 13.600, winning the event by 0.1 ahead of silver medalist Diogo Soares of Brazil. In both of the finals that Dolci was part of, he had the highest execution scores out of all eight gymnasts.

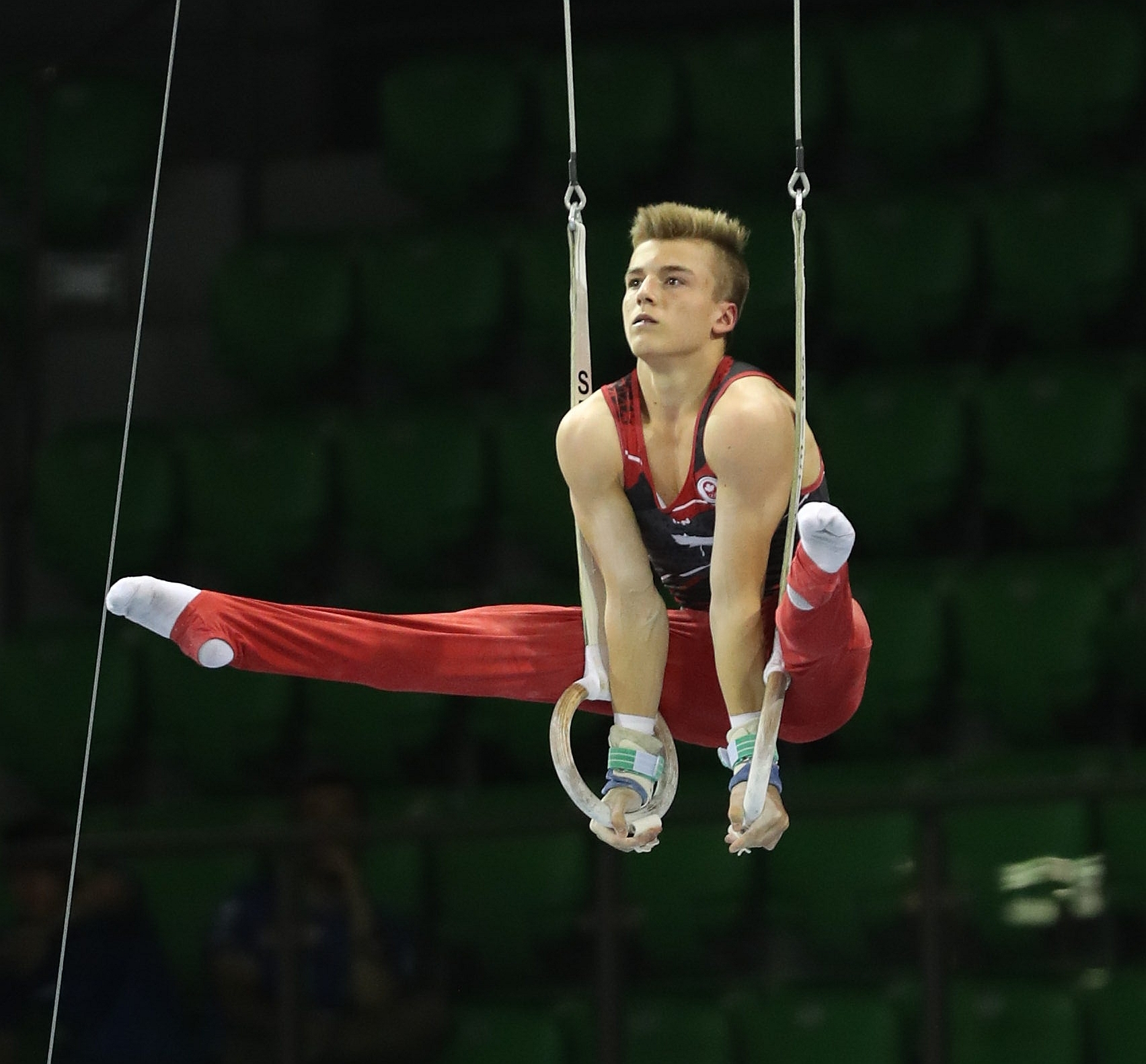
Rings

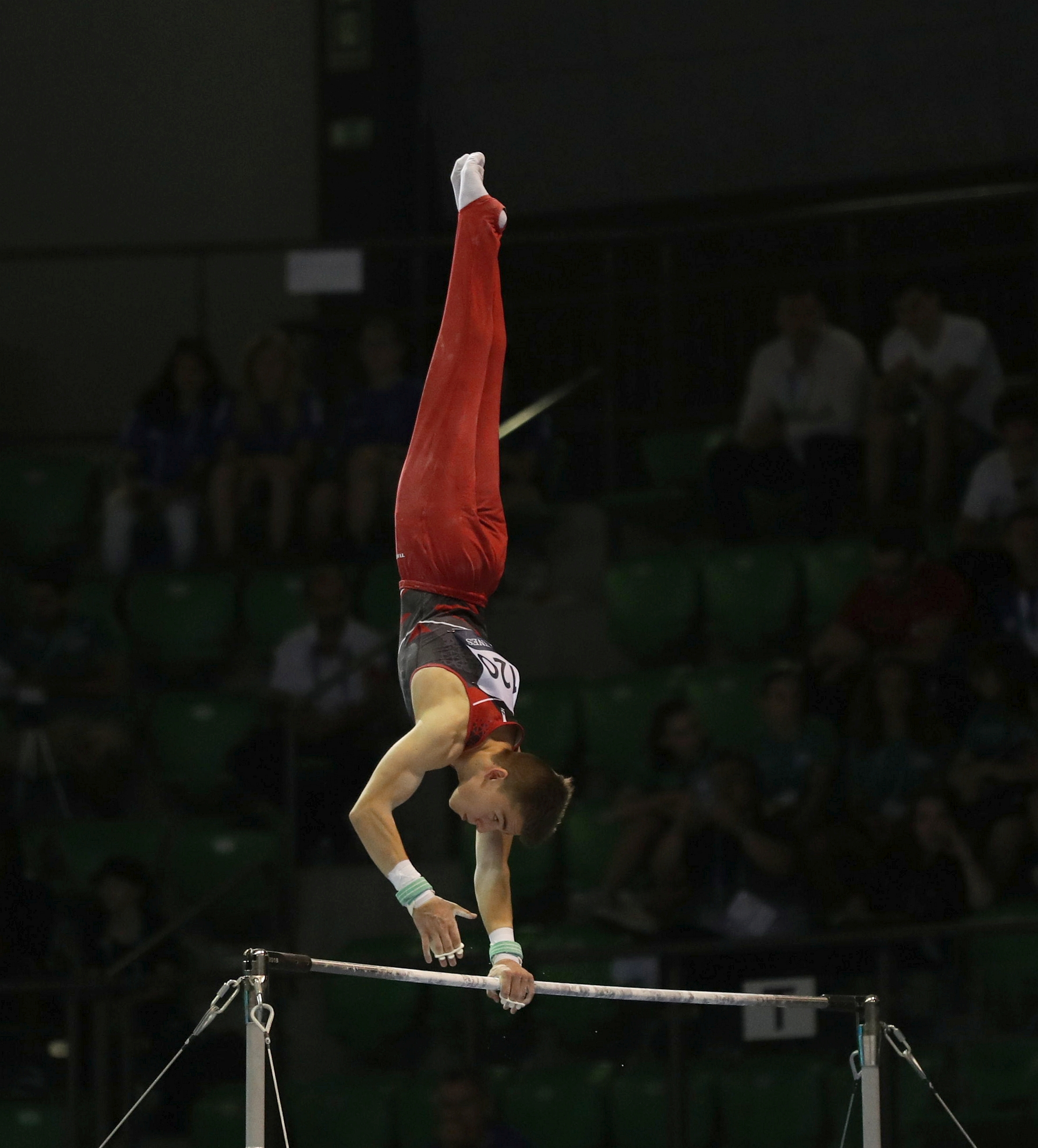
Horizontal bar

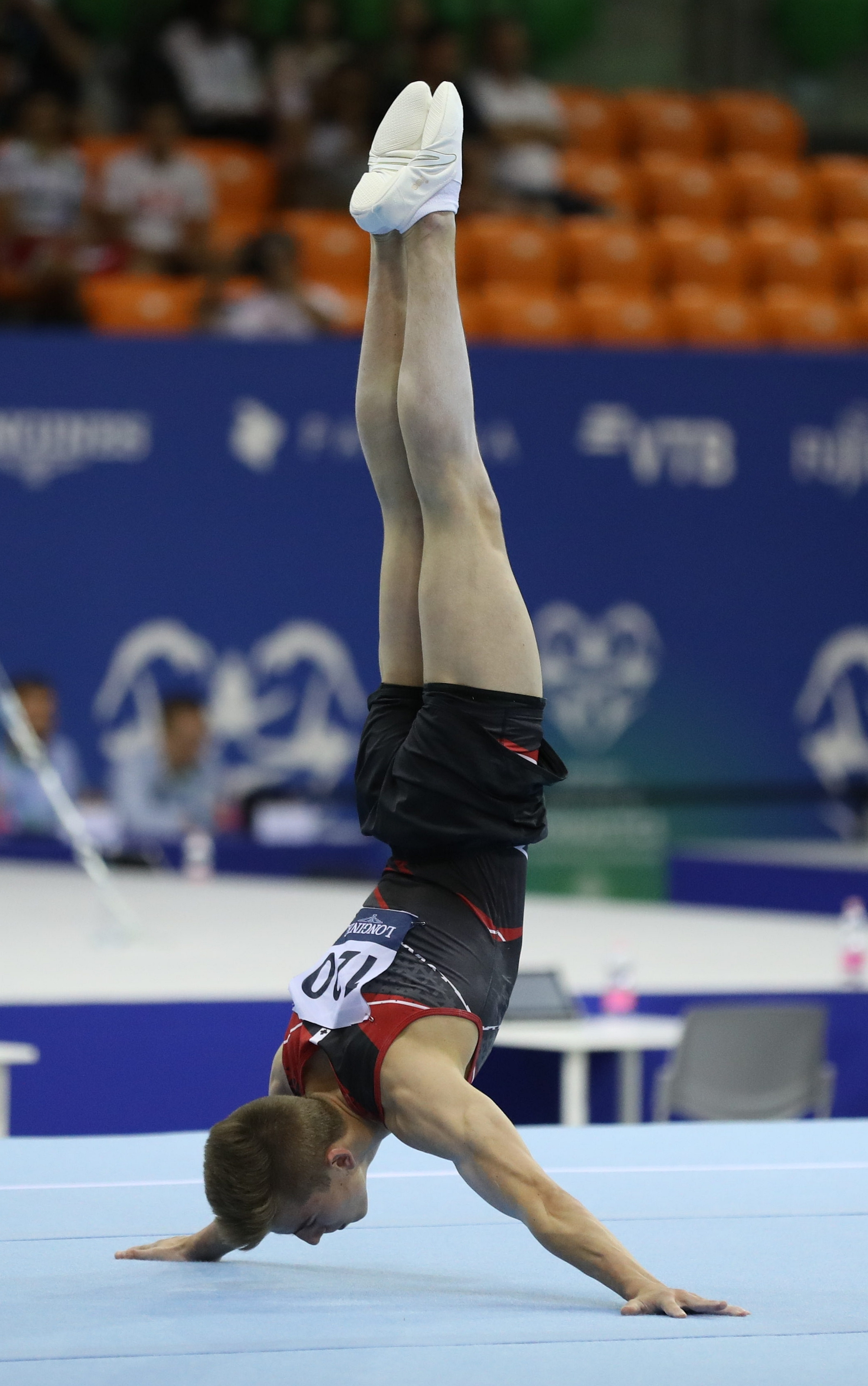
Floor exercise

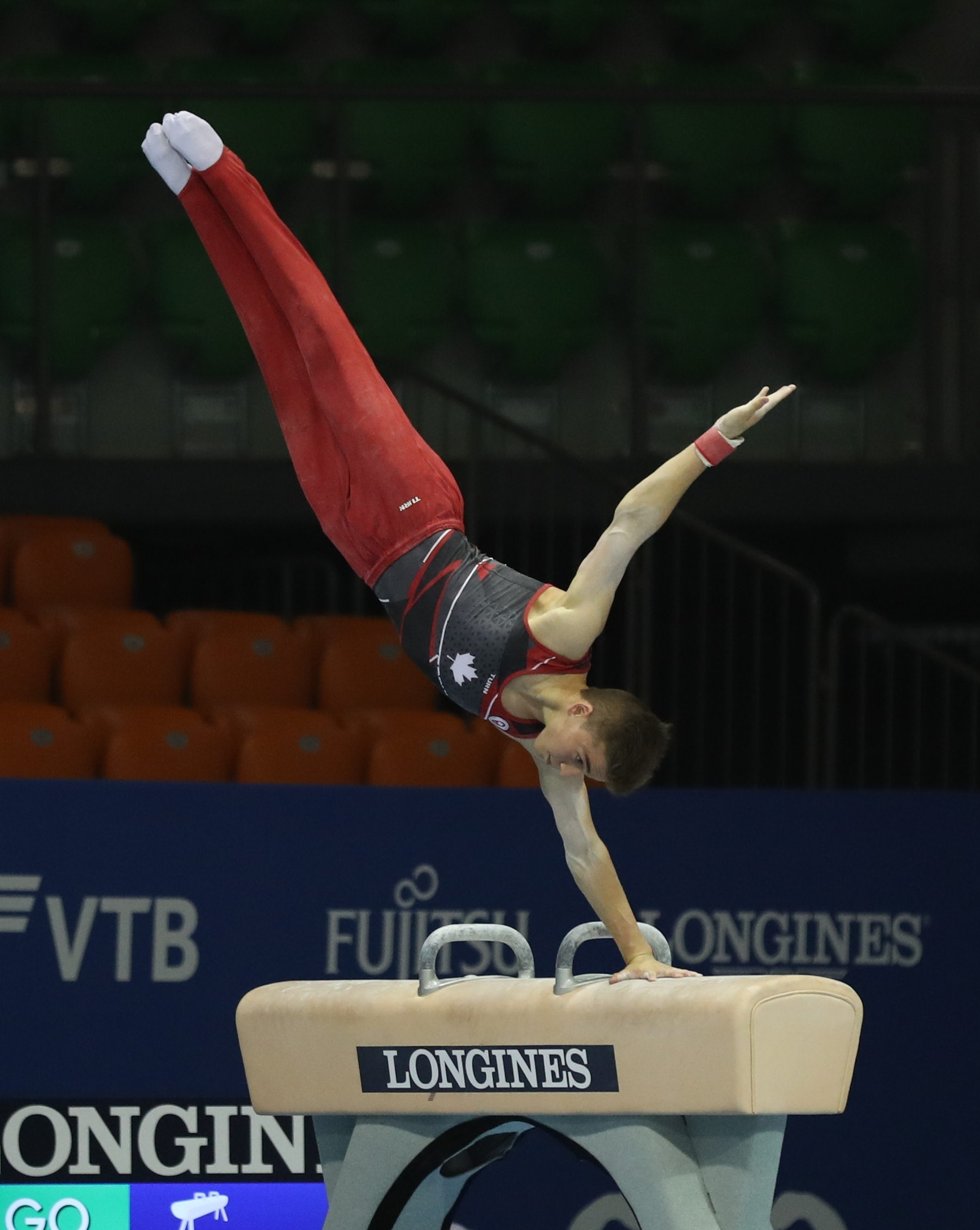
Pommel horse

Dolci at the 2019 Junior World Championships

=== 2020–2021 ===
In 2020, Dolci was about to start his senior career. However, during the COVID-19 pandemic, all gymnastics facilities were closed in Canada. As a result, he had to spend four months training at home. Due to strict travel restrictions, Dolci was not allowed to compete in any international competition until the 2021 FIG Artistic Gymnastics World Cup series. He competed at the World Cup in Koper, Slovenia, winning two bronze medals on vault and horizontal bar. Just a few days later, Dolci would win gold on floor exercise and silver on horizontal bar at the World Cup in Mersin, Turkey. In October he competed at the 2021 World Championships in Kitakyushu. He only competed on rings and horizontal bar; he did not qualify for any event finals.

=== 2022 ===
Dolci competed at the DTB Pokal Team Challenge and Mixed Cup in Stuttgart. During the team challenge, he helped Canada finish fifth as a team, and individually he won gold on floor exercise, silver on horizontal bar behind Carlo Hörr, and bronze on rings and vault. In July he was selected to compete at both the Pan American Championships and the Commonwealth Games. At the Pan American Championships Dolci finished third in the all-around behind Caio Souza and Yul Moldauer. Additionally, he won silver on vault behind Souza and bronze on floor exercise behind Moldauer and Riley Loos. During the team final, Dolci helped Canada finish third behind the US and Brazil.

At the Commonwealth Games, Dolci helped Canada place second behind England. Individually, he qualified to the all-around, floor exercise, rings, vault, and parallel bars finals. He won silver on floor exercise behind Jake Jarman of England and placed fourth in the all-around, on vault, and on parallel bars, and placed fifth on rings. At the 2022 World Championships Dolci placed 35th in the all-around during qualifications and helped the Canadian team finish tenth. He did not qualify for any individual finals.

=== 2023 ===
Dolci competed at the DTB Pokal Team Challenge, where he helped Canada finish eighth. Additionally, he won bronze on still rings and horizontal bar. At the Pan American Championships, Dolci helped Canada finish second as a team behind the United States.

In October, Dolci competed at the 2023 World Championships. During qualifications he helped Canada finish fourth, which qualified Canada a team berth to the 2024 Olympic Games, a feat last achieved by the Canadian men's gymnastics team in 2008. Additionally, he qualified to the floor exercise and horizontal bar event finals. During the team final, Dolci contributed scores on all apparatuses except pommel horse towards Canada's seventh-place finish. During event finals, he finished fifth on floor exercise and eighth on horizontal bar.

Dolci next competed at the Pan American Games. On the first day of competition he helped the Canadian team win the silver medal behind the United States. Individually he qualified to the all-around, floor exercise, rings, and vault finals. During the all-around final, Dolci scored 82.531 to win the gold medal despite falling during his horizontal bar routine. This was the first Pan American Games all-around gold medal won by a male Canadian gymnast since Wilhelm Weiler won it at the 1963 Pan American Games. On the first day of event finals Dolci won gold on floor exercise and bronze on rings behind Donnell Whittenburg and Daniel Villafañe. On the final day of competition, Dolci won bronze on vault, ending his competition with five medals and leaving as the most decorated gymnast.

=== 2024 ===
Dolci began the year competing at Elite Canada, where he placed first in the all-around. He next competed at the DTB Pokal Team Challenge in Stuttgart, where he won bronze on rings and silver on parallel bars. In April Dolci competed at the Pacific Rim Championships in Cali, where he helped Canada win silver as team behind the United States; he withdrew from the event finals for which he qualified. In early June, he competed at the Canadian Championships, where he placed first ahead of René Cournoyer. In late June, Dolci was named to the team to represent Canada at the 2024 Summer Olympics alongside Zachary Clay, Cournoyer, William Émard, and Samuel Zakutney.

At the 2024 Olympic Games, Dolci helped Canada qualify to the team final, and individually he qualified to the all-around final. During the team final Dolci contributed scores on all apparatuses except pommel horse towards Canada's eighth-place finish. During the all-around final, while competing on horizontal bar, his right handgrip snapped causing Dolci to take a hard fall off the apparatus. Since his routine was interrupted due to equipment malfunction, he was able to redo his routine. During his second attempt on the apparatus, he fell on one of his release moves. Dolci performed cleanly on the other five apparatuses, ending the competition in twentieth place.

=== 2025 ===
Dolci competed at the Canadian Championships, where he retained his national title. He competed at the 2025 Pan American Championships, where he won the all-around title, becoming the first Canadian Pan American all-around champion. Additionally, he helped Canada qualify to the team final, where they won the silver medal behind the United States, and individually he qualified to the floor exercise, rings, vault, parallel bars, and horizontal bar finals. During event finals he placed eighth on floor exercise, fourth on rings, and he won gold on vault, parallel bars, and horizontal bar.

In July, Dolci competed at the 2025 World University Games alongside Matteo Bardana, Ioannis Chronopoulos, William Émard, and Jayson Rampersad. Together they finished second behind Japan, earning Canada its first ever men's team medal at the FISU World University Games. Individually Dolci qualified to the floor exercise and horizontal bar finals; however he withdrew from the former. During the horizontal bar final he performed cleanly and won gold ahead of 2020 Olympic champion Daiki Hashimoto.

At the 2025 World Championships, Dolci placed sixteenth in the all-around.

=== 2026 ===
Dolci competed at the 2026 Canadian Championships, where he placed first in the all-around. He next competed at the 2026 Pan American Championships, where he helped Canada win their first-ever Pan American team gold medal. During event finals he placed fourth on floor exercise and won bronze on rings and horizontal bar.

Dolci competed at the 2026 Commonwealth Games alongside Jordan Carroll, René Cournoyer, William Émard, and Ethan Ikeda. Together they won gold as a team, Canada's first Commonwealth men's team gold in twenty years. Individually, Dolci qualified to all event finals besides pommel horse. During the all-around final, Dolci was leading after the first rotation. While performing on pommel horse, Dolci fell twice and earned a score of 9.500, over three points lower than his qualification score; he ended the rotation in seventeenth place (out of eighteen competitors). He rallied on the final four apparatuses, earning the highest score on each apparatus and ended up winning the silver medal, only 0.200 points behind gold medalist Reuben Ward. On the first day of apparatus finals Dolci finished fourth on floor exercise after falling on one of his passes and won gold on rings. On the final day of the competition, Dolci won gold on both vault and horizontal bar and won bronze on parallel bars. With six medals (four gold, one silver, one bronze), Dolci ended the competition as the most decorated gymnast.

Dolci was selected to represent Canada at the 2026 World Championships alongside Carroll, Cournoyer, Xavier Olasz, and Samuel Zakutney. While there Canada finished thirteenth as a team during the qualification round and did not advance to the final. Individually Dolci was the third reserve for the horizontal bar final.

== Competitive history ==
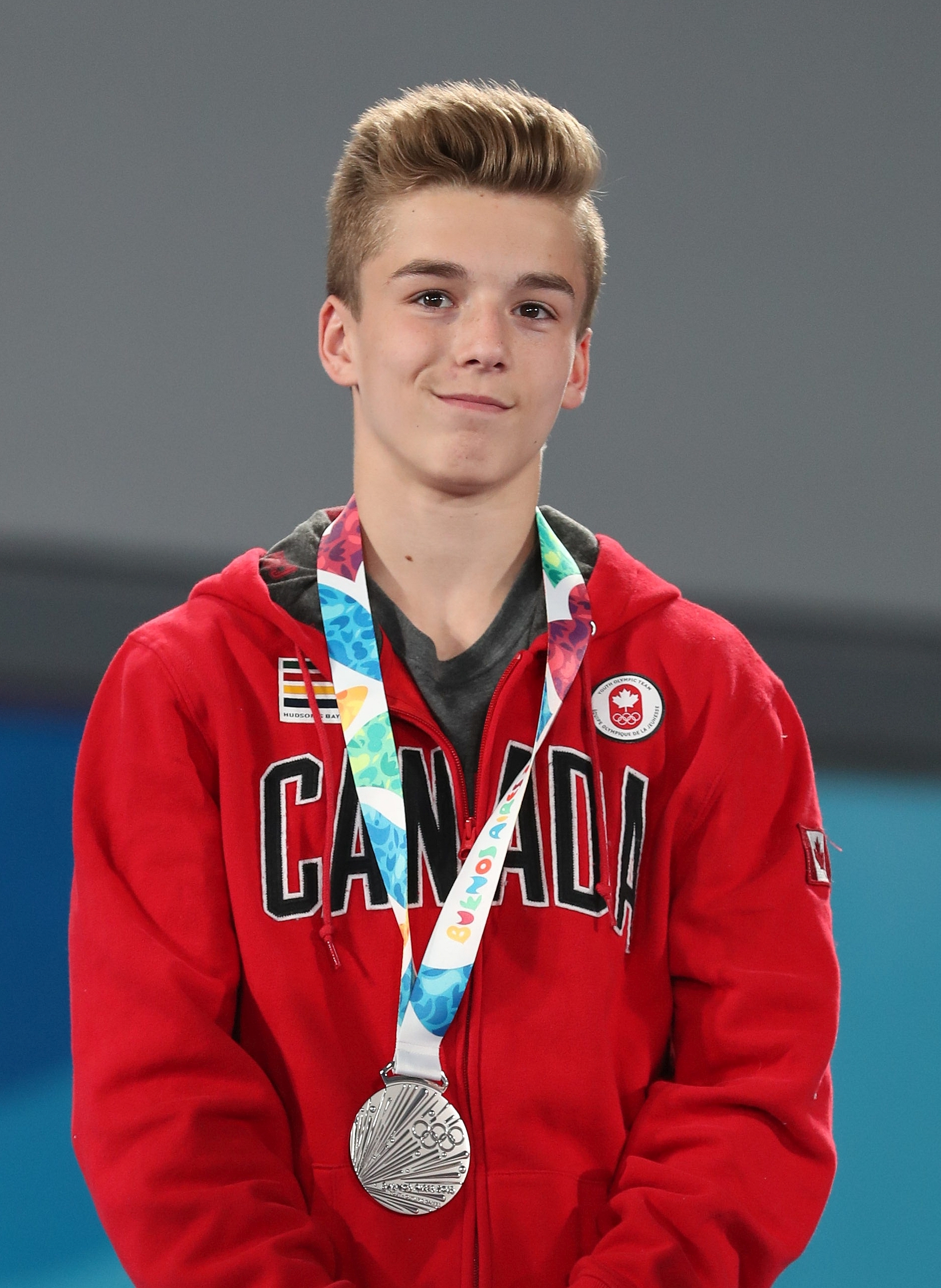
Dolci at the 2018 Youth Olympics

Competitive history of Félix Dolci at the junior level
Year	Event	Team	AA	FX	PH	SR	VT	PB	HB
2018	Pacific Rim Championships	2nd place, silver medalist(s)				2nd place, silver medalist(s)		4	8
2018	Canadian Championships		1st place, gold medalist(s)	1st place, gold medalist(s)	4	2nd place, silver medalist(s)	1st place, gold medalist(s)	3rd place, bronze medalist(s)	1st place, gold medalist(s)
2018	Pan American Championships	3rd place, bronze medalist(s)	3rd place, bronze medalist(s)	3rd place, bronze medalist(s)		1st place, gold medalist(s)			3rd place, bronze medalist(s)
2018	Youth Summer Olympics		9	6		2nd place, silver medalist(s)	7		8
2018	Austrian Future Cup	1st place, gold medalist(s)	1st place, gold medalist(s)	1st place, gold medalist(s)	1st place, gold medalist(s)	1st place, gold medalist(s)	1st place, gold medalist(s)	1st place, gold medalist(s)	3rd place, bronze medalist(s)
2019	UCIC				1st place, gold medalist(s)	1st place, gold medalist(s)		1st place, gold medalist(s)	6
2019	Canadian Championships		1st place, gold medalist(s)	1st place, gold medalist(s)	4	1st place, gold medalist(s)	2nd place, silver medalist(s)	1st place, gold medalist(s)	1st place, gold medalist(s)
2019	Junior World Championships	5	4	2nd place, silver medalist(s)		1st place, gold medalist(s)			
2019	Elite Canada		2nd place, silver medalist(s)	1st place, gold medalist(s)	1st place, gold medalist(s)	1st place, gold medalist(s)	1st place, gold medalist(s)	1st place, gold medalist(s)	

Competitive history of Félix Dolci at the senior level
Year	Event	Team	AA	FX	PH	SR	VT	PB	HB
2021	Mersin Challenge Cup			1st place, gold medalist(s)			5	4	2nd place, silver medalist(s)
2021	Koper Challenge Cup						3rd place, bronze medalist(s)		3rd place, bronze medalist(s)
2021	World Championships					19			24
2022	DTB Pokal Team Challenge	5		1st place, gold medalist(s)		3rd place, bronze medalist(s)	3rd place, bronze medalist(s)		2nd place, silver medalist(s)
2022	DTB Pokal Mixed Cup	4							
2022	Pan American Championships	3rd place, bronze medalist(s)	3rd place, bronze medalist(s)	3rd place, bronze medalist(s)		7	2nd place, silver medalist(s)	4	
2022	Commonwealth Games	2nd place, silver medalist(s)	4	2nd place, silver medalist(s)		5	4	4	
2022	World Championships	10							
2023	Elite Canada		1st place, gold medalist(s)	1st place, gold medalist(s)		1st place, gold medalist(s)	1st place, gold medalist(s)	2nd place, silver medalist(s)	2nd place, silver medalist(s)
2023	DTB Pokal Team Challenge	8				3rd place, bronze medalist(s)			3rd place, bronze medalist(s)
2023	Pan American Championships	2nd place, silver medalist(s)							
2023	RomGym Trophy	2nd place, silver medalist(s)				3rd place, bronze medalist(s)		4	3rd place, bronze medalist(s)
2023	World Championships	7		5					8
2023	Pan American Games	2nd place, silver medalist(s)	1st place, gold medalist(s)	1st place, gold medalist(s)		3rd place, bronze medalist(s)	3rd place, bronze medalist(s)		
2023	Arthur Gander Memorial		3rd place, bronze medalist(s)						
2024	Elite Canada		1st place, gold medalist(s)	1st place, gold medalist(s)	16	4	5	1st place, gold medalist(s)	1st place, gold medalist(s)
2024	DTB Pokal Team Challenge	11				3rd place, bronze medalist(s)		2nd place, silver medalist(s)	
2024	Pacific Rim Championships	2nd place, silver medalist(s)				WD		WD	
2024	Canadian Championships		1st place, gold medalist(s)	1st place, gold medalist(s)	11	4		1st place, gold medalist(s)	1st place, gold medalist(s)
2024	RomGym Trophy		1st place, gold medalist(s)	1st place, gold medalist(s)		2nd place, silver medalist(s)		2nd place, silver medalist(s)	1st place, gold medalist(s)
2024	Olympic Games	8	20						
2024	Arthur Gander Memorial		2nd place, silver medalist(s)						
2025	Canadian Championships		1st place, gold medalist(s)						
2025	Pan American Championships	2nd place, silver medalist(s)	1st place, gold medalist(s)	8		4	1st place, gold medalist(s)	1st place, gold medalist(s)	1st place, gold medalist(s)
2025	World University Games	2nd place, silver medalist(s)		WD					1st place, gold medalist(s)
2025	World Championships	—N/a	16						
2025	Arthur Gander Memorial		2nd place, silver medalist(s)						
2026	Canadian Championships		1st place, gold medalist(s)	1st place, gold medalist(s)			1st place, gold medalist(s)	2nd place, silver medalist(s)	1st place, gold medalist(s)
2026	Pan American Championships	1st place, gold medalist(s)		4		3rd place, bronze medalist(s)			3rd place, bronze medalist(s)
2026	Commonwealth Games	1st place, gold medalist(s)	2nd place, silver medalist(s)	4	R3	1st place, gold medalist(s)	1st place, gold medalist(s)	3rd place, bronze medalist(s)	1st place, gold medalist(s)
2026	World Championships	13							R3

== Television appearances ==
In early 2026, Dolci competed on the sixth season of Big Brother Célébrités. He appeared in the fourth season of The Traitors Canada in fall 2026.
