= Kayhan Ozcicek-Takagi =

Australian judoka

Personal information
- Nationality: Australian
- Born: 15 October 1990 (age 35) Sydney, Australia
- Occupation: Judoka

Sport
- Country: Japan (until 2015); Australia (since 2018)
- Sport: Judo
- Weight class: ‍–‍100 kg, +100 kg
Medal record
Men's judo
Representing Japan
Asian Championships
Gold medal – first place	2015 Kuwait City	‍–‍100 kg
Representing Australia
Oceania Championships
Gold medal – first place	2026 Melbourne	+100 kg
Pan American-Oceania Championships
Bronze medal – third place	2022 Lima	‍–‍100 kg
Asian-Pacific Championships
Bronze medal – third place	2019 Fujairah	‍–‍100 kg
IJF Grand Prix
Silver medal – second place	2025 Gold Coast	+100 kg
Bronze medal – third place	2019 Tel Aviv	‍–‍100 kg
Bronze medal – third place	2019 Marrakesh	‍–‍100 kg
Commonwealth Games
Silver medal – second place	2026 Glasgow	+100 kg

Profile at external databases
- IJF: 1348, 47669
- JudoInside.com: 61488
- Updated on 3 August 2026

Kayhan Ozcicek-Takagi (born 15 October 1990) is a Japanese-born Australian judoka.

Ozcicek-Takagi is a bronze medalist of the 2019 Marrakesh Grand Prix in the ‍–‍100 kg category.

== Personal life ==
Ozcicek-Takagi was born in Australia to a Turkish father and Japanese mother, and moved to Japan ata young age.
