= 2026 Commonwealth Games Parade of Nations =

Opening ceremony event in Glasgow, Scotland

During the Parade of Nations at the 2026 Commonwealth Games opening ceremony, to be held on 23 July 2026, athletes bearing the flags and batons of their respective nations lead their national delegations as they paraded into The Hydro in the host city of Glasgow, Scotland. A total of 74 nations will march into the arena.

For the first time ever, each participating nation created their own baton as part of the King's Baton Relay. Each nation also designated one athlete to carry in the baton as part of the opening ceremony,.

== Parade order ==
In a break from tradition, England did not lead the parade as the previous host nation. Scotland did, however, enter last as the current hosts. All other nations marched in alphabetical order within their respective regions: Africa, Americas, Asia, Caribbean, Oceania, and Europe.

== Countries and flag bearers ==
Below is a list of parading countries and their announced flag bearer(s), in the same order as the parade. This is sortable by country name, flag bearer's name, or flag bearer's sport. Names are given in the form officially designated by the CGF.

| Order | Nation | Flag bearer | Sport | Baton bearer | Sport | Ref. |
|---|---|---|---|---|---|---|
| 1 | Botswana | Maxine Egner | Swimming | Lee Eppie | Athletics | |
| 2 | Cameroon | Nora Monie | Athletics | Junior Ngadja Nyabeyeu | Weightlifting | |
| 3 | Eswatini | Hayley Hoy | Swimming | Mukelo Dlamini | Boxing | |
| 4 | Gabon | Noélie Annette Lacour | Swimming | Kurt Ogouenkero | Team official | |
| 5 | The Gambia | Ousman Jobe | Swimming | Pap Jonga | Swimming | |
| 6 | Ghana | Frema Agyei | Judo | Tahiru Haruna | Para powerlifting | |
| 7 | Kenya | Robert Okaka | Boxing | Hellen Wawira | Para powerlifting | |
| 8 | Lesotho | Rapelang Maselela | Boxing | Mathealira Seholohohlo | Boxing | |
| 9 | Malawi | Deborah Mtenje | Boxing | Zoe Rebello | Swimming | |
| 10 | Mauritius | Fabrice Valerie | Boxing | Anishta Teeluck | Swimming | |
| 11 | Mozambique | Matthew Lawrence | Swimming | Cleyton Munguambe | Swimming | |
| 12 | Namibia | Chenoult Lionel Coetzee | Athletics | Diana Viljoen | Bowls | |
| 13 | Nigeria | Abdul Jabar Adama | Swimming | Folashade Oluwafemiayo | Para powerlifting | |
| 14 | Rwanda | Jayden Ntwali | Swimming | Axela Echessah | Swimming | |
| 15 | Seychelles | Natasha Chetty | Athletics | Adam Moncherry | Swimming | |
| 16 | Sierra Leone | Jordan Aki-Sawyerr | Athletics | Josefien Betist | Boxing | |
| 17 | South Africa | Bridget Herselman | Bowls | Shaun Williams | Wheelchair 3x3 basketball | |
| 18 | Tanzania | Collins Saliboko | Swimming | Zawadi Kutaka | Boxing | |
| 19 | Togo | Fayza Abdoukerim | Athletics | Médard Nayo | Athletics | |
| 20 | Uganda | Mary Cholhok Nuba | Netball | Dennis Mbaziira | Para powerlifting | |
| 21 | Zambia | Muzala Samukonga | Athletics | Catherine Mwape | Boxing | |
| 22 | Bahamas | Zaylie-Elizabeth Thompson | Swimming | Rashield Williams | Boxing | |
| 23 | Belize | Davia Richardson | Swimming | Leticia Westby | Chef de mission | |
| 24 | Bermuda | Tiara DeRosa | Athletics | Caitlyn Bobb | Athletics | |
| 25 | Canada | Kady Dandeneau | Wheelchair 3x3 basketball | Ryan Bester | Bowls | |
| 26 | Falkland Islands | Oliver Thompson | Bowls | Daphne Arthur-Almond | Bowls | |
| 27 | Guyana | Travis Belgrave | 3x3 basketball | Aaliyah Moore | Athletics | |
| 28 | Saint Helena | Sean Crowie | Athletics | William Caswell | Swimming | |
| 29 | Bangladesh | Samiul Islam Rafi | Swimming | Sonia Aktar | Swimming | |
| 30 | Brunei | Joel Ling | Swimming | Sharmeen Mohammad Mharvin | Swimming | |
| 31 | India | Mirabai Chanu | Weightlifting | Lovlina Borgohain | Boxing | |
| 32 | Malaysia | Abdul Latif Romly | Para athletics | Emma Firyana Saroji | Bowls | |
| 33 | Maldives | Mohamed Aan Hussain | Swimming | Meral Ayn Latheef | Swimming | |
| 34 | Pakistan | Arshad Nadeem | Athletics | Fatima Zahra | Boxing | |
| 35 | Singapore | Gan Ching Hwee | Swimming | Mawjit Singh | Para bowls | |
| 36 | Sri Lanka | Palitha Bandara | Para athletics | Janani Dhananjana | Para athletics | |
| 37 | Anguilla | Tri-tania Lowe | Athletics | Jonathan Irizarry | Swimming | |
| 38 | Antigua and Barbuda | Alston Ryan | Boxing | Aunjulique Liddie | Swimming | |
| 39 | Barbados | Erin Pinder | Artistic gymnastics | Antwahn Boyce-Vaughan | Para swimming | |
| 40 | British Virgin Islands | Adaejah Hodge | Athletics | Jaleel Croal | Athletics | |
| 41 | Cayman Islands | Connor Macdonald | Swimming | Siena Santiago | Artistic gymnastics | |
| 42 | Dominica | Thea LaFond | Athletics | Jasmine Schofield | Swimming | |
| 43 | Grenada | Zachary Gresham | Swimming | Tilly Collymore | Swimming | |
| 44 | Jamaica | Collin McKenzie | Swimming | Shamera Sterling | Netball | |
| 45 | Montserrat | Julius Morris | Team official | Amani Kirnon | Athletics | |
| 46 | Saint Lucia | Helena Renee | Chef de mission | Volunteer | Volunteer | |
| 47 | Saint Kitts and Nevis | Skyla Connor | Swimming | Jonathan Essien | Swimming | |
| 48 | Saint Vincent and the Grenadines | Kennice Greene | Swimming | Matthew Ballah | Swimming | |
| 49 | Trinidad and Tobago | Nigel Paul | Boxing | Joelisa Cooper | Netball | |
| 50 | Turks and Caicos Islands | Lerano Missick | Athletics | Arleigha Hall | Swimming | |
| 51 | Australia | Nina Kennedy | Athletics | Timothy Hodge | Para swimming | |
| 52 | Cook Islands | Teokotai Jim | Bowls | Jacob Story | Swimming | |
| 53 | Fiji | David Young | Swimming | Anahira McCutcheon | Swimming | |
| 54 | Kiribati | Tavita Kaoma | Boxing | Andrew Kometa | Coach | |
| 55 | Nauru | Femily-Crystie Notte | Weightlifting | Winzar Kakiouea | Athletics | |
| 56 | New Zealand | David Liti | Weightlifting | Moira de Villiers | Judo | |
| 57 | Niue | Duken Tutakitoa-Williams | Boxing | Christine Ioane | Bowls | |
| 58 | Norfolk Island | Micheal Trickey | Bowls | Christine Jones | Bowls | |
| 59 | Papua New Guinea | Morea Baru | Weightlifting | Pais Wisil | Athletics | |
| 60 | Samoa | Sanele Mao | Weightlifting | Iuniarra Sipaia | Weightlifting | |
| 61 | Solomon Islands | Maximilian Makana | Boxing | Moffet Tolomae | Para powerlifting | |
| 62 | Tonga | Hulita Veve | Netball | Finau Ohuafi | Swimming | |
| 63 | Tuvalu | Pasoni Taafaki | Boxing | Malia Timo | Weightlifting | |
| 64 | Vanuatu | Ajah Pritchard-Lolo | Weightlifting | Thomas Wilbur | Weightlifting | |
| 65 | Cyprus | Elena Kulichenko | Athletics | Maria Markou | Para powerlifting | |
| 66 | England | Sian Honnor | Bowls | Luke Greenbank | Swimming | |
| 67 | Gibraltar | Jordan Gonzalez | Swimming | Holly O’Shea | Weightlifting | |
| 68 | Guernsey | Alison Merrien | Bowls | Ian Merrien | Bowls | |
| 69 | Isle of Man | Alfie Bezance | Para powerlifting | Laura Kinley | Swimming | |
| 70 | Jersey | Malcolm De Sousa | Bowls | Lucy Woodward | Athletics | |
| 71 | Malta | Connie Rixon | Bowls | Nick Mercieca | Para powerlifting | |
| 72 | Northern Ireland | Gary Kelly | Bowls | Bethany Firth | Para swimming | |
| 73 | Wales | Rosie Eccles | Boxing | Daniel Salmon | Bowls | |
| 74 | Scotland | Alex Marshall | Bowls | Sarah Adlington | Judo | |
