= Bowls at the 2026 Commonwealth Games – Women's pairs =

Bowls event

Bowls women's pairs at the 2026 Commonwealth Games
- Venue: SEC Centre
- Dates: 23 July – 28 July 2026
- Competitors: 50 from 25 nations

Medalists
gold medal	Amy Pharaoh; Sian Honnor	England
silver medal	Syafiqa Haidar; Aleena Nawawi	Malaysia
bronze medal	Chloe Wilson; Shauna O'Neill	Northern Ireland

Bowls at the 2026 Commonwealth Games – Women's pairs was held at the SEC Centre in Glasgow from 23 to 28 July. Twenty five nations entered the event. England's Amy Pharaoh and Sian Honnor won the gold medal, defeating Syafiqa Haidar and Aleena Nawawi of Malaysia in the final. Chloe Wilson and Shauna O'Neill from Northern Ireland won the bronze medal.

== Sectional play ==
The top team from each section advances to the knockout stage.

=== Section A ===
Rank	Athlete	MP	MW	ML	FR	AG	PD	PTS
1	Shauna O'Neill / Chloe Wilson (NIR) (Q)	6	5	1	88	29	+59	15
2	Kelsey Cottrell / Dawn Hayman (AUS)	6	5	1	93	35	+58	15
3	Alison Merrien / Rose Ogier (GGY)	6	5	1	70	28	+42	15
4	Janice Tan / Cheo Ai Lin (SGP)	6	3	3	54	66	−12	9
5	Foster Banda / Getrude Siame (ZAM)	6	2	4	41	72	−31	6
6	Caroline Whitehead / Paula Garrett (IOM)	6	1	5	39	69	−30	3
7	Christine Ioane / Catherine Papani (NIU)	6	0	6	21	107	–86	0

	Guernsey	Isle of Man	Australia	Zambia	Northern Ireland	Singapore	Niue
Guernsey	—	2–0	2–0	2–0	0–2	1.5–0.5	1.5–0.5
Isle of Man	0–2	—	0–2	1–1*	0–2	0–2	2–0
Australia	0–2	2–0	—	2–0	2–0	2–0	2–0
Zambia	0–2	1*–1	0–2	—	0–2	1–1*	1.5–0.5
Northern Ireland	2–0	2–0	0–2	2–0	—	2–0	2–0
Singapore	0.5–1.5	2–0	0–2	1–1*	0–2	—	2–0
Niue	0.5–1.5	0–2	0–2	0.5–1.5	0–2	0–2	—

=== Section B ===
Rank	Athlete	MP	MW	ML	FR	AG	PD	PTS
1	Sian Honnor / Amy Pharaoh (ENG) (Q)	5	4	1	43	35	+8	12
2	Amanda Steenkamp / Diana Viljoen (NAM)	5	4	1	37	51	-14	12
3	Rupa Rani Tirkey / Pinki Singh (IND)	5	3	2	54	43	+11	9
4	J.J. van Rensburg / Elinah Muvhango (RSA)	5	2	3	57	41	+16	6
5	Milika Nathan / Paris Baker (TGA)	5	1	4	41	39	+2	3
6	Connie Rixon / Rebecca Rixon (MLT)	5	1	4	31	54	-23	3

	India	Malta	South Africa	Tonga	Namibia	England
India	—	1^{*}–1	2–0	1^{*}–1	1–1^{*}	1–1^{*}
Malta	1–1^{*}	—	0–2	1^{*}–1	1–1^{*}	0–2
South Africa	0–2	2–0	—	1–1^{*}	1–1^{*}	1^{*}–1
Tonga	1–1^{*}	1–1^{*}	1^{*}–1	—	0–2	1–1^{*}
Namibia	1^{*}–1	1^{*}–1	1^{*}–1	2–0	—	0–2
England	1^{*}–1	2–0	1–1^{*}	1^{*}–1	2–0	—

=== Section C ===
Rank	Athlete	MP	MW	ML	FR	AG	PD	PTS
1	Amy Williams / Lauren Gowen (WAL) (Q)	5	4	1	81	18	+63	12
2	Katelyn Inch / Selina Goddard (NZL)	5	4	1	60	33	+27	12
3	Emma Boyd / Kelly McKerihen (CAN)	5	4	1	56	38	+18	12
4	Litia Tikoisuva / Losalini Tukai (FIJ)	5	2	3	38	58	-20	6
5	Gaoromelwe Belemo / Sabathu Sinombe (BOT)	5	1	4	30	77	–47	3
6	Eunice Wambui Mbugua / Nancy Cheruiyot (KEN)	5	0	5	27	68	-41	0

	Wales	Canada	Fiji	Kenya	Botswana	New Zealand
Wales	—	2–0	2–0	2–0	2–0	1–1^{*}
Canada	0–2	—	2–0	2–0	2–0	1^{*}–1
Fiji	0–2	0–2	—	1.5–0.5	1.5–0.5	0–2
Kenya	0–2	0–2	0.5–1.5	—	1–1^{*}	1–1^{*}
Botswana	0–2	0–2	0.5–1.5	1^{*}–1	—	0–2
New Zealand	1^{*}–1	1–1^{*}	2–0	1^{*}–1	2–0	—

=== Section D ===
Rank	Athlete	MP	MW	ML	FR	AG	PD	PTS
1	Syafiqa Haidar / Aleena Nawawi (MAS) (Q)	5	5	0	78	22	+56	15
2	Ellie Dixon / Christine Jones (NFI)	5	3	2	62	31	+31	9
3	Beth Riva / Caroline Brown (SCO)	5	3	2	58	35	+23	9
4	Sara Douglas / Fiona Archibald (JEY)	5	3	2	50	43	7	9
5	Tai Jim / Fa'amanatu Ngatoko-Poila (COK)	5	1	4	31	80	−49	3
6	Kris Thorsen / Sharon Barnes (FLK)	5	0	5	22	90	−68	0

	Jersey	Norfolk Island	Falkland Islands	Malaysia	Cook Islands	Scotland
Jersey	—	0−2	2−0	0−2	2−0	1^{*}−1
Norfolk Island	2−0	—	2−0	0.5−1.5	2−0	1−1^{*}
Falkland Islands	0−2	0−2	—	0−2	0−2	0−2
Malaysia	2−0	1.5−0.5	2−0	—	2−0	2−0
Cook Islands	0−2	0−2	2−0	0−2	—	0−2
Scotland	1−1^{*}	1^{*}−1	2−0	0−2	0−2	—

== Knockout stage ==
Semifinals
Northern Ireland	1
Malaysia	1*
England	1*
Wales	1

Final
Malaysia	0.5
England	1.5
Bronze final
Northern Ireland	2
Wales	0
