= Norfolk Island at the 2026 Commonwealth Games =

- Flag of Norfolk Island
- CG code: NFK
- CGA: Norfolk Island Amateur Sports and Commonwealth Games Association
- Website: facebook.com/teamnorfolkisland (Facebook)

in Glasgow, Scotland 23 July 2026 – 2 August 2026
- Competitors: 6 in 1 sport
- Flag bearer: Micheal Trickey
- Baton bearer: Christine Jones
- Medals Ranked =36th: Gold 0 Silver 0 Bronze 1 Total 1

Commonwealth Games appearances (overview)
- 1986; 1990; 1994; 1998; 2002; 2006; 2010; 2014; 2018; 2022; 2026; 2030

Norfolk Island competed at the 2026 Commonwealth Games in Glasgow, Scotland. This marked Norfolk Island's 11th participation at the games, after making its debut at the 1986 Commonwealth Games.

The King's Baton relay stopped in Norfolk Island in March 2026.

The territory is scheduled to compete in one sport, bowls. The Norfolk Island team consisted of six athletes (three per gender) competing in bowls. Bowler Micheal Trickey was the territory's opening ceremony flagbearer. Meanwhile, bowls athlete Christine Jones was the baton bearer during the opening ceremony.

Norfolk Island won one medal, a bronze by Shae Wilson in the women's singles bowls event.

== Competitors ==
The following is the list of number of competitors participating at the Games per sport/discipline.

Sport	Men	Women	Total
Bowls	3	3	6
Total	3	3	6

== Medallist ==
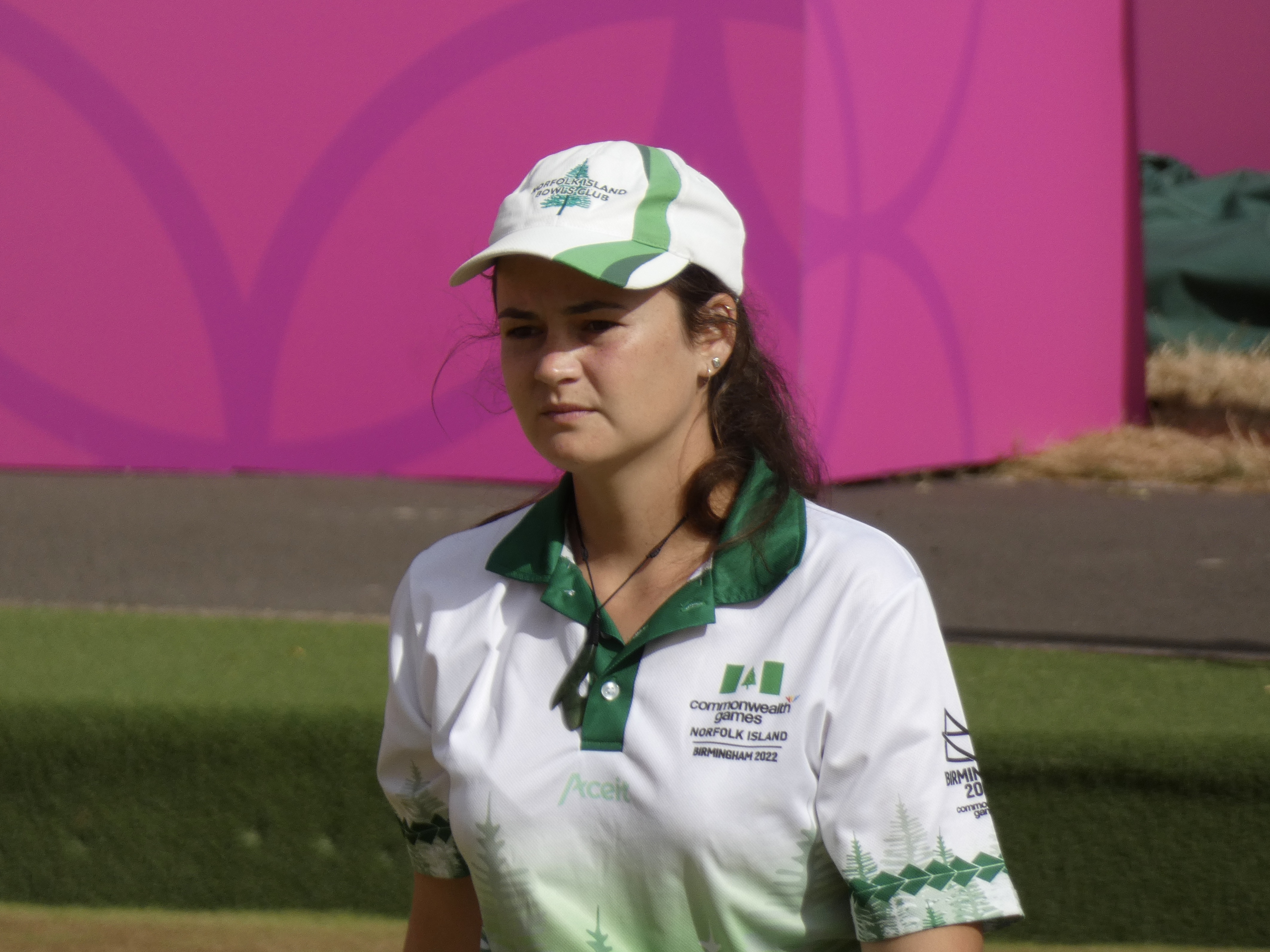
Shae Wilson pictured here at the 2022 Commonwealth Games, won bronze in the women's singles bowls event

The following competitor a won medal at the games. In the by discipline sections below, medallists' names are bolded.

Medal	Name	Sport	Event	Date	Ref.
Bronze	Shae Wilson	Bowls	Women's singles	2 August	

== Bowls ==
Norfolk Island entered six bowlers (three per gender).

Athlete	Event	Group Stage							Semifinal	Final / BM	
Athlete	Event	Opposition Score	Opposition Score	Opposition Score	Opposition Score	Opposition Score	Opposition Score	Rank	Opposition Score	Opposition Score	Rank
Mitchell Graham	Men's singles	Rittmuller (RSA); **L** 0–2	Yuen (SGP); **D** 1*–1	Tafatu (NIU); **W** 2–0	Kelly (NIR); **D** 1–1*	Hill (TGA); **W** 2–0	McIlroy (NZL); **L** 0.5–1.5	4	Did not advance		
Jeht Nobbs; Micheal Trickey	Men's pairs	South Africa; **L** 0–2	Kenya; **W** 2–0	Scotland; **L** 0–2	Isle of Man; **W** 1.5–0.5	Canada; **L** 0–2	—N/a	4	Did not advance		
**Shae Wilson**	Women's singles	Nathan (TGA); **W** 1*–1	Viljoen (NAM); **W** 2–0	Moceiwai (FIJ); **W** 2–0	Mbugua (KEN); **W** 1*–1	McGrouther (SCO); **W** 2–0	—N/a	1 **Q**	Rednall (ENG); **L** 1–1*	Saroji (MAS); **W** 2–0	3rd place, bronze medalist(s)
Ellie Dixon; Christine Jones	Women's pairs	Cook Islands; **W** 2–0	Scotland; **L** 1–1*	Jersey; **W** 2–0	Falkland Islands; **W** 2–0	Malaysia; **L** 0.5–1.5	—N/a	2	Did not advance		

== See also ==
- Norfolk Island at the 2023 Pacific Games
