= Guernsey at the 2026 Commonwealth Games =

- Flag of Guernsey
- CG code: GGY
- CGA: Guernsey Commonwealth Games Association
- Website: guernseycga.gg

in Glasgow, Scotland 22 July 2026 – 2 August 2026
- Competitors: 20 in 4 sports
- Flag bearer: Alison Merrien
- Baton bearer: Ian Merrien
- Medals Ranked =31st: Gold 0 Silver 1 Bronze 0 Total 1

Commonwealth Games appearances (overview)
- 1970; 1974; 1978; 1982; 1986; 1990; 1994; 1998; 2002; 2006; 2010; 2014; 2018; 2022; 2026; 2030

Guernsey competed at the 2026 Commonwealth Games in Glasgow, Scotland between 23 July and 2 August 2026. Having made its Games debut in 1970, it was Guernsey's fourteenth appearance to date.

The King's Baton relay stopped in Guernsey in June 2026, the penultimate stop before heading to Scotland.

Guernsey's team consists of 20 athletes in four sports. Bowler Alison Merrien was the country's flagbearer during the opening ceremony. Meanwhile, her husband and fellow bowler Ian Merrien was the baton bearer during the opening ceremony.

On the final day of the Games, Alison Merrien won Guernsey's only medal when she took silver in the women's bowls singles.

== Competitors ==
Guernsey received a quota of 20 open allocation slots from Commonwealth Sport. This quota is used to determine the overall team in sports lacking a qualifying system.

The following is the list of number of competitors participating at the Games per sport/discipline.

Sport	Men	Women	Total
Athletics	1	1	2
Boxing	2	0	2
Bowls	2	2	4
Swimming	4	8	12
Total	9	11	20

== Medallist ==
The following competitor a won medal at the games. In the by discipline sections below, medallists' names are bolded.

Medal	Name	Sport	Event	Date	Ref.
Silver	Alison Merrien	Bowls	Women's singles	2 August	

== Athletics ==
Two athletes (one per gender) were officially selected on 19 March 2026.

Track events

Athlete	Event	Heat		Semifinal		Final	
Athlete	Event	Result	Rank	Result	Rank	Result	Rank
Alastair Chalmers	Men's 400 m hurdles	48.92	1 **Q**	—N/a		50.24	6
Abi Galpin	Women's 200 m	24.45	5	Did not advance			

Field event

Athlete	Event	Qualification		Final	
Athlete	Event	Distance	Rank	Distance	Rank
Abi Galpin	Women's long jump	5.94 **PB**	17	Did not advance	

== Bowls ==
Guernsey entered four bowlers (two men and two women).

Athlete	Event	Group Stage							Semi-final	Final / BM	
Athlete	Event	Opposition Score	Opposition Score	Opposition Score	Opposition Score	Opposition Score	Opposition Score	Rank	Opposition Score	Opposition Score	Rank
Jason Greenslade	Men's singles	Wilson (AUS); **L** 0.5–1.5	Mphotho (BOT); **W** 2–0	Wentzel (NAM); **W** 2–0	Aperau (COK); **L** 0–2	Greechan (JEY); **W** 2–0	McGreal (IOM); **W** 1.5–0.5	3	did not advance		
Jason Greenslade; Ian Merrien	Men's pairs	Jersey; **W** 2–0	Niue; **W** 2–0	Wales; **L** 0.5–1.5	Malta; **W** 2–0	Malaysia; **L** 0.5–1.5	—N/a	2	did not advance		
**Alison Merrien**	Women's singles	Ioane (NIU); **W** 2–0	Mooketsi (BOT); **W** 2–0	Tiong (SGP); **W** 2–0	O’Neill (NIR); **W** 2–0	Bruce (NZL); **L** 0–2	—N/a	1 **Q**	Saroji (MAS); **W** 2–0	Rednall (ENG); **L** 0–2	2nd place, silver medalist(s)
Alison Merrien; Rose Ogier	Women's pairs	Isle of Man; **W** 2–0	Australia; **W** 2–0	Zambia; **W** 2–0	Northern Ireland; **L** 0–2	Singapore; **W** 1.5–0.5	Niue; **W** 1.5–0.5	3	did not advance		

== Boxing ==
Guernsey entered two male boxers.

Men

Athlete	Event	Round of 32	Round of 16	Quarterfinals	Semifinals	Final	
Athlete	Event	Opposition Result	Opposition Result	Opposition Result	Opposition Result	Opposition Result	Rank
Tommy Teers	55 kg	Temakau (KIR); **L** 1–3	Did not advance				
Niall Adams	60 kg	Bye	Jayantha (SRI); **W** 4–1	Ndevelo (NAM); **L** 0–5	Did not advance		

== Swimming ==
Guernsey entered 12 swimmers (four men and eight women).

Men

Athlete	Event	Heat		Semifinal		Final	
Athlete	Event	Time	Rank	Time	Rank	Time	Rank
Henry Bolton	50 m freestyle	24.58	46	Did not advance			
Henry Bolton	100 m freestyle	54.20	49	Did not advance			
Henry Bolton	200 m freestyle	2:00.90	32	—N/a		Did not advance	
Henry Bolton	50 m backstroke	29.34	34	Did not advance			
Henry Bolton	100 m backstroke	1:02.65	24	Did not advance			
Henry Bolton	200 m backstroke	2:26.87	18	—N/a		Did not advance	
Charlie-Joe Hallett	50 m breaststroke	28.69	23	Did not advance			
Charlie-Joe Hallett	100 m breaststroke	1:03.87	21	Did not advance			
Charlie-Joe Hallett	200 m breaststroke	2:26.55	13	—N/a		Did not advance	
Ronny Hallett	50 m freestyle	DNS		Did not advance			
Ronny Hallett	50 m breaststroke	28.69	23	Did not advance			
Ronny Hallett	50 m butterfly	26.00	44	Did not advance			
Zachary Maiden	200 m freestyle	2:03.22	34	—N/a		Did not advance	
Zachary Maiden	400 m freestyle	4:22.81	24	—N/a		Did not advance	
Zachary Maiden	50 m backstroke	29.24	33	Did not advance			
Zachary Maiden	100 m backstroke	1:03.59	26	Did not advance			
Zachary Maiden	200 m backstroke	2:19.26	17	—N/a		Did not advance	
Henry Bolton; Charlie-Joe Hallett; Ronny Hallett; Zachary Maiden	4 × 100 m freestyle relay	3:39.34	13	—N/a		Did not advance	
Henry Bolton; Charlie-Joe Hallett; Ronny Hallett; Zachary Maiden	4 × 100 m medley relay	DQ		—N/a		Did not advance	

Women

Athlete	Event	Heat		Semifinal		Final	
Athlete	Event	Time	Rank	Time	Rank	Time	Rank
Emma Bourgaize	50 m freestyle	27.50	38	Did not advance			
Emma Bourgaize	100 m freestyle	59.64	34	Did not advance			
Emma Bourgaize	50 m breaststroke	35.06	22	Did not advance			
Emma Bourgaize	100 m butterfly	1:08.52	28	Did not advance			
Orla Rabey	100 m freestyle	58.40	30	Did not advance			
Orla Rabey	50 m butterfly	28.39	25	Did not advance			
Orla Rabey	100 m butterfly	1:03.76	18	Did not advance			
Tallulah-Mae Rautenbach	50 m freestyle	27.03	29	Did not advance			
Tallulah-Mae Rautenbach	50 m backstroke	31.41	28	Did not advance			
Tallulah-Mae Rautenbach	100 m backstroke	1:08.64	32	Did not advance			
Delphine Riley	200 m freestyle	2:11.01	28	—N/a		Did not advance	
Delphine Riley	400 m freestyle	4:36.16	26	—N/a		Did not advance	
Delphine Riley	800 m freestyle	—N/a				9:34.74	19
Elodie Riley	200 m freestyle	2:11.68	30	—N/a		Did not advance	
Elodie Riley	400 m freestyle	4:41.16	27	—N/a		Did not advance	
Elodie Riley	800 m freestyle	—N/a				9:45.48	20
Molly Staples	50 m backstroke	31.92	33	Did not advance			
Molly Staples	50 m butterfly	29.10	34	Did not advance			
Tatiana Tostevin	50 m freestyle	26.95	27	Did not advance			
Tatiana Tostevin	100 m freestyle	59.10	33	Did not advance			
Tatiana Tostevin	50 m backstroke	29.59	18	Did not advance			
Tatiana Tostevin	100 m backstroke	1:04.30	21	Did not advance			
Tatiana Tostevin	50 m butterfly	28.92	31	Did not advance			
Oriana Wheeler	100 m breaststroke	1:14.84	20	Did not advance			
Oriana Wheeler	100 m butterfly	1:03.94	19	Did not advance			
Oriana Wheeler	200 m butterfly	2:24.08	11	—N/a		Did not advance	
Oriana Wheeler	200 m individual medley	2:24.67	13	—N/a		Did not advance	
Oriana Wheeler	400 m individual medley	5:10.32	10	—N/a		Did not advance	
Emma Bourgaize; Orla Rabey; Tallulah-Mae Rautenbach; Tatiana Tostevin	4 × 100 m freestyle relay	3:55.88	7 **Q**	—N/a		3:56.64	8
Orla Rabey; Tallulah-Mae Rautenbach; Tatiana Tostevin; Orla Wheeler	4 × 100 m medley relay	4:22.15	8 **Q**	—N/a		4:21.66	8

Mixed

Athlete	Event	Heats		Final	
Athlete	Event	Time	Rank	Time	Rank
Henry Bolton; Charlie-Joe Hallett; Orla Rabey; Tatiana Tostevin	4 × 100 m freestyle relay	3:46.15	14	Did not advance	
Henry Bolton; Charlie-Joe Hallett; Orla Rabey; Tatiana Tostevin	4 × 100 m medley relay	4:06.20	10	Did not advance	
