= Bowls at the 2026 Commonwealth Games – Women's singles =

Bowls event

Bowls women's singles at the 2026 Commonwealth Games
- Venue: SEC Centre
- Dates: 28 July – 3 August 2026
- Competitors: 25 from 25 nations

Medalists
gold medal	Katherine Rednall	England
silver medal	Alison Merrien	Guernsey
bronze medal	Shae Wilson	Norfolk Island

Bowls at the 2026 Commonwealth Games – Women's singles was held at the SEC Centre in Glasgow from 28 July to 3 August. Twenty five nations entered the event. Katherine Rednall of England won the gold medal, defeating Guernsey's Alison Merrien in the final. Shae Wilson from Norfolk Island won the bronze medal.

== Sectional play ==
The top team from each section advance to the knockout stage.

=== Section A ===
Rank	Athlete	MP	MW	MT	ML	FR	AG	PD	PTS
1	Katherine Rednall (ENG) (Q)	6	5	0	1	89	55	+34	15
2	Ellen Fife (AUS)	6	5	0	1	85	66	+19	15
3	Kelly McKerihen (CAN)	6	4	0	2	96	55	+41	12
4	Daphne Arthur-Almond (FLK)	6	3	0	3	59	79	–20	9
5	Emily Jim (COK)	6	2	0	4	63	77	–14	6
6	Connie Rixon (MLT)	6	2	0	4	69	74	-5	6
7	Abbey Andrieux (JEY)	6	0	0	6	49	104	–55	0

	England	Jersey	Canada	Malta	Falkland Islands	Australia	Cook Islands
England	—	2–0	1–1*	1*–1	2–0	1.5–0.5	2–0
Jersey	0–2	—	0–2	1–1*	0–2	0–2	0–2
Canada	1*–1	2–0	—	2–0	1–1*	1–1*	2−0
Malta	1–1*	1*–1	0–2	—	1*–1	0.5–1.5	0–2
Falkland Islands	0−2	2−0	1*–1	1–1*	—	0–2	2–0
Australia	1.5–0.5	2–0	1*–1	1.5–0.5	2–0	—	1*–1
Cook Islands	0–2	2–0	0–2	2–0	0–2	1–1*	—

=== Section B ===
Rank	Athlete	MP	MW	MT	ML	FR	AG	PD	PTS
1	Alison Merrien (GGY) (Q)	5	4	0	1	81	40	+41	12
2	Shauna O’Neill (NIR)	5	4	0	1	76	47	+29	12
3	Tayla Bruce (NZL)	5	3	0	2	76	51	+25	9
4	Serena Tiong (SGP)	5	3	0	2	68	46	+22	9
5	Boikhutso Mooketsi (BOT)	5	1	0	4	51	76	–25	0
6	Catherine Papani (NIU)	5	0	0	5	21	113	–92	0

	Northern Ireland	Niue	Botswana	Singapore	New Zealand	Guernsey
Northern Ireland	—	2–0	2–0	1*–1	1*–1	0–2
Niue	0–2	—	0–2	0–2	0–2	0–2
Botswana	0–2	2–0	—	1–1*	0–2	0–2
Singapore	1−1*	2–0	1*–1	—	2–0	0–2
New Zealand	1–1*	2–0	2–0	0–2	—	2–0
Guernsey	2–0	2–0	2–0	2–0	0−2	—

=== Section C ===
Rank	Athlete	MP	MW	MT	ML	FR	AG	PD	PTS
1	Emma Firyana Saroji (MAS) (Q)	5	5	0	0	85	33	+52	15
2	Amy Williams (WAL)	5	4	0	1	89	34	+55	12
3	Bridget Calitz (RSA)	5	3	0	2	72	49	+23	9
4	Nayanmoni Saikia (IND)	5	2	0	3	74	62	+12	6
5	Mildred Mkandawire (ZAM)	5	1	0	4	33	111	–78	3
6	Caroline Whitehead (IOM)	5	0	0	5	34	98	–64	0

	Wales	India	South Africa	Isle of Man	Malaysia	Zambia
Wales	—	2–0	2–0	2–0	0-2	2–0
India	0–2	—	1–1*	2–0	0.5–1.5	2–0
South Africa	0–2	1*–1	—	2–0	0–2	2–0
Isle of Man	0–2	0–2	0–2	—	0–2	0–2
Malaysia	2–0	2–0	2–0	2–0	—	2–0
Zambia	0–2	0–2	0–2	2–0	0–2	—

=== Section D ===
Rank	Athlete	MP	MW	MT	ML	FR	AG	PD	PTS
1	Shae Wilson (NFI) (Q)	5	5	0	0	79	49	+30	15
2	Sophie McGrouther (SCO)	5	3	0	2	67	42	+25	9
3	Milika Nathan (TGA)	5	3	0	2	50	62	–12	9
4	Diana Viljoen (NAM)	5	2	0	3	58	63	–5	6
5	Eunice Wambui Mbugua (KEN)	5	1	0	4	55	59	–4	3
6	Elizabeth Moceiwai (FIJ)	5	1	0	4	38	72	–34	3

	Scotland	Fiji	Kenya	Namibia	Tonga	Norfolk Island
Scotland	—	2–0	1.5–0.5	2–0	1–1*	0–2
Fiji	0–2	—	1*–1	0.5–1.5	0.5–1.5	0–2
Kenya	0.5–1.5	0.5–1.5	—	0–2	2–0	1–1*
Namibia	0–2	1.5–0.5	2–0	—	0–2	0–2
Tonga	1*–1	1.5–0.5	0–2	2–0	—	1–1*
Norfolk Island	2–0	2–0	1*–1	2–0	1*–1	—

== Knockout stage ==
Semifinals
Katherine Rednall (ENG)	1*
Shae Wilson (NFI)	1
Alison Merrien (GGY)	2
Emma Firyana Saroji (MAS)	0

Final
Katherine Rednall (ENG)	2
Alison Merrien (GGY)	0
Bronze final
Shae Wilson (NFI)	2
Emma Firyana Saroji (MAS)	0
