= Falkland Islands at the 2026 Commonwealth Games =

- Flag of the Falkland Islands
- CG code: FLK
- CGA: Falkland Islands Overseas Games Association

in Glasgow, Scotland 23 July 2026 – 2 August 2026
- Competitors: 6 in 1 sport
- Flag bearer: Oliver Thompson
- Baton bearer: Daphne Arthur-Almond
- Medals: Gold 0 Silver 0 Bronze 0 Total 0

Commonwealth Games appearances (overview)
- 1982; 1986; 1990; 1994; 1998; 2002; 2006; 2010; 2014; 2018; 2022; 2026; 2030

The Falkland Islands competed at the 2026 Commonwealth Games in Glasgow, Scotland. This marked the Falkland Islands' 12th participation at the games, after making its debut at the 1982 Commonwealth Games. The Falkland Islands team consisted of six athletes (three per gender), competing in the sport of bowls.

The King's Baton relay stopped in the Falkland Islands in March 2026.

Bowls athlete Oliver Thompson was the country's flagbearer during the opening ceremony. Meanwhile, fellow bowls athlete Daphne Arthur-Almond was the baton bearer during the opening ceremony.

== Competitors ==
The following is the list of number of competitors participating at the Games per sport/discipline.

Sport	Men	Women	Total
Bowls	3	3	6
Total	3	3	6

== Bowls ==
The Falkland Islands entered six bowlers (three per gender). The team practiced on makeshift mats put into a school hallway in the lead up to the games, as there was no dedicated indoor facility in The Falkland Islands. Overall the team had seven victories across the four events it competed in.

Athlete	Event	Group Stage							Semifinal	Final / BM	
Athlete	Event	Opposition Score	Opposition Score	Opposition Score	Opposition Score	Opposition Score	Opposition Score	Rank	Opposition Score	Opposition Score	Rank
Cecil Alexander	Men's singles	Dzulkeple (MAS); L 0–2	Sonowal (IND); L 1–1*	Hamada (KEN); W 2–0	Bester (CAN); L 1–1*	Parnis (MLT); W 2–0	—N/a	3	Did not advance		
Oliver Thompson; Ian Barnes	Men's pairs	England; L 0–2	Cook Islands; W 2–0	Namibia; L 0.5–1.5	India; L 0–2	Botswana; W 1.5–0.5	—N/a	4	Did not advance		
Daphne Arthur-Almond	Women's singles	Jim (COK); W 2–0	Rixon (MLT); L 1–1*	McKerihen (CAN); W 1*–1	Fife (AUS); L 0–2	Andrieux (JEY); W 2–0	Rednall (ENG); L 0–2	4	Did not advance		
Kris Thorsen; Sharon Barnes	Women's pairs	Malaysia; L 0–2	Cook Islands; L 0–2	Scotland; L 0–2	Norfolk Island; L 0–2	Jersey; L 0–2	—N/a	6	Did not advance		

== See also ==
- 2025 Island Games
