= Niue at the 2026 Commonwealth Games =

- Niue Island Sports and Commonwealth Games Association
- CG code: NIU
- CGA: Niue Overseas Games Association
- Website: www.facebook.com/NISCGA

in Glasgow, Scotland 23 July 2026 – 2 August 2026
- Competitors: 11 in 3 sports
- Flag bearer: Duken Tutakitoa-Williams
- Baton bearer: Christine Ioane
- Medals: Gold 0 Silver 0 Bronze 0 Total 0

Commonwealth Games appearances (overview)
- 2002; 2006; 2010; 2014; 2018; 2022; 2026; 2030

Niue was represented at the 2026 Commonwealth Games in Glasgow, Scotland by the Niue Island Sports and Commonwealth Games Association. Glasgow 2026 marked the seventh occasion that Niue had competed at the Commonwealth Games following its debut at the 2002 Commonwealth Games in Manchester, England, United Kingdom.

In total, 11 athletes including eight men and three women represented Niue in three sports including athletics, bowls and boxing.

== Background ==
In the run-up to the games, the King's Baton Relay stopped in Niue between 20 and 25 January 2026 as part of the Oceanian leg of the relay. Unlike previous games, each Commonwealth Games Association received an individual baton crafted in Glasgow which they were permitted to customise to reflect local culture.

In April 2025, Sidney Lui was named as the team's chef de mission.

Originally, 16 athletes were due to represent Niue but the final entry list only included 11 athletes.

The 2026 Commonwealth Games marked Niue's seventh participation at the games, after making its debut at the 2002 Commonwealth Games in Manchester, England, United Kingdom.

=== Opening ceremony ===
Boxer Duken Tutakitoa-Williams was selected as Niue's flagbearer for the opening ceremony and bowls player Christine Ioane was selected as the baton bearer.

== Competitors ==
In total, 11 athletes represented Niue at the 2026 Commonwealth Games in Glasgow, Scotland across three different sports.

Sport	Men	Women	Total
Athletics	1	0	1
Bowls	3	2	5
Boxing	4	1	5
Total	8	3	11

== Athletics ==
In total, one Niuean athlete participated in the athletics events – Caleb Misipeka.

Athlete	Event	Qualification		Final	
Athlete	Event	Result	Rank	Result	Rank
Caleb Misipeka	Men's shot put	11.10 SB	15	Did not advance	

== Bowls ==
In total, five Niuean athletes participated in the bowls events – Christine Ioane, Catherine Papani, Keith Papani, Frederick Tafatu and Tifaga Tupuiliu. Lynsey Talagi was originally named to the team but was later withdrawn.

Athlete	Event	Group Stage							Semifinal	Final / BM	
Athlete	Event	Opposition Score	Opposition Score	Opposition Score	Opposition Score	Opposition Score	Opposition Score	Rank	Opposition Score	Opposition Score	Rank
Frederick Tafatu	Men's singles	Kelly (NIR); L 0–2	Hill (TGA); L 0–2	McIlroy (NZL); L 1–1*	Graham (NFK); L 0–2	Rittmuller (RSA); L 0–2	Yuen (SGP); L 0–2	7	Did not advance		
Keith Papani; Tifaga Tupuiliu	Men's pairs	Wales; L 0–2	Guernsey; L 0–2	Malaysia; L 0–2	Jersey; L 1–1*	Malta; L 0–2	—N/a	6	Did not advance		
Catherine Papani	Women's singles	Merrien (GGY); L 0–2	Kelly (SGP); L 0–2	O'Neill (NIR); L 0–2	Bruce (NZL); L 0–2	Mooketsi (BOT); L 0–2	—N/a	6	Did not advance		
Christine Ioane; Catherine Papani	Women's pairs	Northern Ireland; L 0–2	Singapore; L 0–2	Zambia; L 0.5–1.5	Australia; L 0–2	Isle of Man; L 0–2	Guernsey; L 1.5–0.5	7	Did not advance		

== Boxing ==
In total, five Niuean athletes participated in the boxing events – Kalani Anitelea, Phoenix Gataua, De Niro Paō, Karen Te Ruki Pasene and Duken Tutakitoa-Williams. Pasene became the first women's boxer to represent Niue at the Commonwealth Games.

Athlete	Event	Round of 32	Round of 16	Quarterfinals	Semifinals	Final	
Athlete	Event	Opposition Result	Opposition Result	Opposition Result	Opposition Result	Opposition Result	Rank
Phoenix Gataua	Men's 60 kg	Moremi (BOT); L 0–5	Did not advance				
De Niro Paō	Men's 65 kg	Khoahli (LES); L 0–5	Did not advance				
Kalani Anitelea	Men's 80 kg	Ojok (UGA); L 0–5	Did not advance				
Duken Tutakitoa-Williams	Men's 90 kg	Bye	Bye	Williams (WAL); L 1–4	Did not advance		
Karen Te Ruki Pasene	Women's 65 kg	Bye	Bye	Rock (NIR); L 0–5	Did not advance		

== See also ==
- Niue at the 2023 Pacific Games
