= Cook Islands at the 2026 Commonwealth Games =

- Flag of Cook Islands
- CG code: COK
- CGA: Cook Islands Sports and National Olympic Committee

in Glasgow, Scotland 23 July 2026 – 2 August 2026
- Competitors: 15 in 4 sports
- Flag bearer: Teokotai Jim
- Baton bearer: Jacob Story
- Medals: Gold 0 Silver 0 Bronze 0 Total 0

Commonwealth Games appearances (overview)
- 1974; 1978; 1982; 1986; 1990; 1994; 1998; 2002; 2006; 2010; 2014; 2018; 2022; 2026; 2030

The Cook Islands was represented at the 2026 Commonwealth Games in Glasgow, Scotland by the Cook Islands Sports and National Olympic Committee. Glasgow 2026 marked the 13th occasion that the Cook Islands had competed at the Commonwealth Games following its debut at the 1974 British Commonwealth Games in Christchurch, New Zealand.

In total, 15 athletes including eight men and seven women represented the Cook Islands in four different sports including athletics, bowls, swimming and weightlifting.

== Background ==
In the run-up to the games, the King's Baton Relay stopped in the Cook Islands between 3 and 8 March 2026 as part of the Oceanian leg of the relay. Unlike previous games, each Commonwealth Games Association received an individual baton crafted in Glasgow which they were permitted to customise to reflect local culture.

Mark Short served as the delegation's chef de mission.

The 2026 Commonwealth Games marked the Cook Islands' 13th participation at the games, after making its debut at the 1974 British Commonwealth Games in Christchurch, New Zealand.

=== Opening ceremony ===
Bowls player Teokotai Jim was selected as the Cook Islands' flagbearer for the opening ceremony and swimmer Jacob Story was selected as the baton bearer.

== Competitors ==
In total, 15 athletes represented the Cook Islands at the 2026 Commonwealth Games in Glasgow, Scotland across four different sports.

Sport	Men	Women	Total
Athletics	3	1	4
Bowls	3	3	6
Swimming	2	2	4
Weightlifting	0	1	1
Total	8	7	15

== Athletics ==
In total, four Cook Islander athletes participated in the athletics events – Samasoni Hewitt, Piritau Nga, Estelle Short and Max Teuruaa.

Track events
Athlete	Event	Heat		Semifinal		Final	
Athlete	Event	Result	Rank	Result	Rank	Result	Rank
Estelle Short	Women's 100 metres	12.58	7	Did not advance			

Field events
Athlete	Event	Qualification		Final	
Athlete	Event	Distance	Rank	Distance	Rank
Piritau Nga	Men's long jump	6.42	19	Did not advance	
Samasoni Hewitt	Men's high jump	—N/a		1.90	14

Combined events – Men's decathlon
Athlete	Event	100 m	LJ	SP	HJ	400 m	110H	DT	PV	JT	1500 m	Final	Rank
Max Teuruaa	Result	11.18	6.64	11.31	1.76	51.95	15.93	30.02	4.00	49.81	4:54.83	6434 NR	11
Max Teuruaa	Points	821	729	565	593	727	741	465	617	586	590	6434 NR	11

== Bowls ==
In total, four Cook Islander athletes participated in the bowls events – Royden Aperau, Emily Jim, Teokotai Jim, Jason Lindsay, Epii Poila and Vasie Poila.

Athlete	Event	Group Stage							Semifinal	Final / BM	
Athlete	Event	Opposition Score	Opposition Score	Opposition Score	Opposition Score	Opposition Score	Opposition Score	Rank	Opposition Score	Opposition Score	Rank
Royden Aperau	Men's singles	Greechan (JEY); W 1*–1	McGreal (IOM); L 0–2	Greenslade (GGY); W 2–0	Wilson (AUS); L 0–2	Mphotho (BOT); W 2–0	Wentzel (NAM); W 1*–1	4	Did not advance		
Jason Lindsay; Epii Poila	Men's pairs	India; L 1–1*	Falkland Islands; L 0–2	England; L 1–1*	Botswana; L 0.5–1.5	Namibia; L 1–1*	—N/a	6	Did not advance		
Emily Jim	Women's singles	Rixon (MLT); W 2–0	Arthur-Almond (FLK); L 0–2	Andrieux (JEY); W 2–0	Rednall (ENG); L 0–2	McKerihen (CAN); L 0–2	Fife (AUS); L 1–1*	5	Did not advance		
Teokotai Jim; Vasie Poila	Women's pairs	Norfolk Island; L 0–2	Falkland Islands; W 2–0	Malaysia; L 0–2	Jersey; L 0–2	Scotland; L 0–2	—N/a	5	Did not advance		

== Swimming ==
In total, four Cook Islander athletes participated in the swimming events – Lanihei Connolly, Mia Laban, Carter Makira and Jacob Story.

By qualifying from his heat in the men's 200 m breaststroke, Story became the first swimmer from the Cook Islands to make the final of a swimming event at the Commonwealth Games.

Athlete	Event	Heat		Semifinal		Final	
Athlete	Event	Time	Rank	Time	Rank	Time	Rank
Carter Makira	Men's 100 m backstroke	1:00.54	23	Did not advance			
Carter Makira	Men's 200 m backstroke	2:13.69	15	—N/a		Did not advance	
Carter Makira	Men's 50 m breaststroke	30.85	43	Did not advance			
Carter Makira	Men's 100 m breaststroke	1:08.00	34	Did not advance			
Carter Makira	Men's 200 m individual medley	2:12.60	18	—N/a		Did not advance	
Jacob Story	Men's 50 m breaststroke	28.63	22	Did not advance			
Jacob Story	Men's 100 m breaststroke	1:02.43	16 Q	1:02.26	16	Did not advance	
Jacob Story	Men's 200 m breaststroke	2:15.05	8 Q	—N/a		2:14.48	8
Lanihei Connolly	Women's 50 m breaststroke	31.81	10 Q	31.73	10 R	Did not advance	
Lanihei Connolly	Women's 100 m breaststroke	1:08.71	11 Q	1:10.39	15	Did not advance	
Lanihei Connolly	Women's 200 m breaststroke	2:34.04	11	—N/a		Did not advance	
Mia Laban	Women's 50 m freestyle	27.31	36	Did not advance			
Mia Laban	Women's 100 m backstroke	1:07.28	29	Did not advance			
Mia Laban	Women's 100 m butterfly	1:04.50	21	Did not advance			
Carter Makira; Jacob Story; Lanihei Connolly; Mia Laban	Mixed 4 × 100 m freestyle relay	3:45.81	13	—N/a		Did not advance	

== Weightlifting ==
In total, one Cook Islander athlete participated in the weightlifting events – Mata McDonald.

Athlete	Event	Snatch (kg)		Clean & Jerk (kg)		Total (kg)	Rank
Athlete	Event	Result	Rank	Result	Rank	Total (kg)	Rank
Mata McDonald	Women's +86 kg	89	8	113	7	202	7
