= Namibia at the 2026 Commonwealth Games =

- Flag of Namibia
- CG code: NAM
- CGA: Namibia National Olympic Committee
- Website: olympic.org.na

in Glasgow, Scotland 23 July 2026 – 2 August 2026
- Competitors: 23 in 5 sports
- Flag bearer: Chenoul Lionel Coetzee
- Baton bearer: Diana Viljoen
- Medals Ranked 29th: Gold 0 Silver 1 Bronze 2 Total 3

Commonwealth Games appearances (overview)
- 1994; 1998; 2002; 2006; 2010; 2014; 2018; 2022; 2026; 2030

Namibia competed at the 2026 Commonwealth Games in Glasgow, Scotland. This marked Namibia's ninth participation at the games, after making its debut at the 1994 Commonwealth Games.

The Namibian team consisted of 23 athletes (14 men and eight women) competing in five sports. The team also consisted of 16 officials.

Athlete Chenoul Lionel Coetzee was the country's flagbearer during the opening ceremony. Meanwhile, bowls athlete Diana Viljoen was the baton bearer during the opening ceremony.

Namibia concluded the games with three medals (one silver and two bronze), all won in boxing.

== Competitors ==
The following is the list of number of competitors participating at the Games per sport/discipline.

Sport		Men	Women	Total
Artistic gymnastics		0	4	4
Athletics	Athletics	4	0	4
Athletics	Para-athletics	1	0	1
Bowls		2	2	4
Boxing		4	1	5
Swimming		4	1	5
Total		15	8	23

== Medallists ==
The following Namibian competitors won medals at the games. In the by discipline sections below, medallists' names are bolded.

Medal	Name	Sport	Event	Date	Ref.
Silver	Tryagain Ndevelo	Boxing	Men's 60 kg	1 August	
Bronze	Philip Haoseb	Boxing	Men's 55 kg	31 July	
Bronze	Mischa Araes	Boxing	Women's 51 kg	31 July	

== Artistic gymnastics ==
Namibia entered four female gymnasts.

Women
Team Final & Individual Qualification

Athlete	Event	Apparatus				Total	Rank
Athlete	Event	VT	UB	BB	FL	Total	Rank
Sureshni Andrew	Team	11.050	6.850	~~6.800~~	~~9.800~~	34.500	37
Tyesha Humphries	Team	11.450	7.800	9.850	10.650	39.750	33
Anne-Leen Thorburn	Team	11.550	7.850	7.900	10.550	37.850	36
Jonie Thorburn	Team	~~10.500~~	~~6.250~~	6.900	9.850	33.500	38
**Total**	Team	34.050	22.500	24.650	31.050	112.250	10

== Athletics ==
Namibia entered five male track and field athletes plus one guide.

Key

Ranks given for track events are within the athlete's heat only.

- **Q** = Qualified for the next round
- **q** = Qualified for the next round as a fastest loser or, in field events, by position without achieving the qualifying target

Men
Track events

Athlete	Event	Heat		Semifinal		Final	
Athlete	Event	Result	Rank	Result	Rank	Result	Rank
Charley Matundu	100 m	10.50	3	Did not advance			
Charley Matundu	200 m	21.00	3	Did not advance			
Elvis Khikhoe Gaseb	400 m	47.30	3	Did not advance			

Field events

Athlete	Event	Qualification		Final	
Athlete	Event	Distance	Rank	Distance	Rank
Ryan Williams	Discus throw	—N/a		55.37	8
Chenoult Lionel Coetzee	Long jump	7.66	11 **q**	7.46	11

=== Para athletics ===
Track events

Athlete	Event	Round one		Final	
Athlete	Event	Result	Rank	Result	Rank
Ananias Shikongo; Even Tjiviju (guide)	Men's 100 m (T12)	DSQ		Did not advance	

== Bowls ==
Namibia entered four bowlers (two of each gender).

Athlete	Event	Group Stage							Semifinal	Final / BM	
Athlete	Event	Opposition Score	Opposition Score	Opposition Score	Opposition Score	Opposition Score	Opposition Score	Rank	Opposition Score	Opposition Score	Rank
Waylon Wentzel	Men's singles	Mphotho (BOT); **W** 1.5–0.5	Wilson (AUS); **L** 0–2	Greenslade (GGY); **L** 0–2	Greechan (JEY); **L** 1–1*	McGreal (IOM); **L** 0–2	Aperau (COK); **L** 1–1*	6	Did not advance		
Ronald Steenkamp; Waylon Wentzel	Men's pairs	Botswana; **W** 2–0	India; **L** 0–2	Falkland Islands; **W** 1.5–0.5	England; **L** 0–2	Cook Islands; **W** 1*–1	—N/a	3	Did not advance		
Diana Viljoen	Women's singles	Mbugua (KEN); **W** 2–0	Wilson (NFK); **L** 0–2	McGrouther (SCO); **L** 0–2	Moceiwai (FIJ); **W** 1.5–0.5	Nathan (TGA); **L** 0–2	—N/a	4	Did not advance		
Amanda Steenkamp; Diana Viljoen	Women's pairs	England; **L** 0–2	Malta; **W** 1*–1	South Africa; **W** 1*–1	India; **W** 1*–1	Tonga; **W** 2–0	—N/a	2	Did not advance		

== Boxing ==
Namibia entered five boxers (four men and one woman). Mischa Araes became the first women's boxer to represent the country at the Commonwealth Games.

Athlete	Event	Round of 32	Round of 16	Quarterfinals	Semifinals	Final	
Athlete	Event	Opposition Result	Opposition Result	Opposition Result	Opposition Result	Opposition Result	Rank
**Philip Haoseb**	Men's 55 kg	Vilakati (SWZ); **W** 5–0	Yaya (TOG); **W** RSC	Mukuka (NZL); **W** 4–0	Mukuka (NZL); **L** 0–5	Did not advance	3rd place, bronze medalist(s)
**Tryagain Ndevelo**	Men's 60 kg	Joseph (TTO); **W** WO	Reza (BAN); **W** 5–0	Adams (GGY); **W** 5–0	Gallagher (NIR); **W** 3–2	Siwach (IND); **L** 2–3	2nd place, silver medalist(s)
Gebhard Ipinge	Men's 80 kg	Bye	Trainor (AUS); **L** 2–3	Did not advance			
Petrus Kotze	Men's 90 kg	—N/a	Williams (WAL); **L** RSC	Did not advance			
**Mischa Araes**	Women's 51 kg	—N/a	Bye	Ranasinghe (SRI); **W** 4–0	White (WAL); **L** RSC	Did not advance	3rd place, bronze medalist(s)

== Swimming ==
Namibia entered five swimmers (four men and one woman). Ronan Wantenaar became the first Namibian swimmer to make the final of a Commonwealth Games swimming event.

Athlete	Event	Heat		Semifinal		Final	
Athlete	Event	Time	Rank	Time	Rank	Time	Rank
Luke Beukes	Men's 50 m freestyle	22.94	14 **Q**	22.85	15	—N/a	
Luke Beukes	Men's 100 m freestyle	50.69	25	—N/a			
Luke Beukes	Men's 200 m freestyle	1:54.51	24	—N/a		—N/a	
Luke Beukes	Men's 50 m butterfly	24.82	24	—N/a			
Luke Beukes	Men's 100 m butterfly	56.80	29	—N/a			
Jose Canjulo	Men's 200 m freestyle	1:56.35	28	—N/a		—N/a	
Jose Canjulo	Men's 50 m breaststroke	29.21	31	—N/a			
Jose Canjulo	Men's 100 m breaststroke	1:05.30	27	—N/a			
Jose Canjulo	Men's 200 m breaststroke	2:26.68	14	—N/a		—N/a	
Jose Canjulo	Men's 100 m butterfly	55.47	21	—N/a			
Oliver Durand	Men's 200 m freestyle	1:52.53	22	—N/a		—N/a	
Oliver Durand	Men's 100 m butterfly	54.52	16 **Q**	53.98	13	—N/a	
Oliver Durand	Men's 200 m butterfly	2:01.84	12	—N/a		—N/a	
Oliver Durand	Men's 200 m individual medley	2:03.09	10 **R**	—N/a		—N/a	
Oliver Durand	Men's 400 m individual medley	4:27.85	9 **R**	—N/a		—N/a	
Ronan Wantenaar	Men's 50 m breaststroke	27.13	3 **Q**	27.21	5 **Q**	27.31	6
Ronan Wantenaar	Men's 100 m breaststroke	1:02.70	17 **R**	—N/a			
Jessica Humphrey	Women's 50 m freestyle	26.33	21	—N/a			
Jessica Humphrey	Women's 100 m freestyle	58.29	28	—N/a			
Jessica Humphrey	Women's 50 m backstroke	29.08	13 **Q**	28.88	11	—N/a	
Jessica Humphrey	Women's 100 m backstroke	1:01.83	13 **Q**	1:02.34	14	—N/a	
Jessica Humphrey	Women's 50 m butterfly	27.97	20	—N/a			
