= Tonga at the 2026 Commonwealth Games =

- Flag of Tonga
- CG code: TGA
- CGA: Tonga Sports Association and National Olympic Committee
- Website: facebook.com/TASANOC (Facebook)

in Glasgow, Scotland 23 July 2026 – 2 August 2026
- Competitors: 28 in 8 sports
- Flag bearer: Hulita Veve
- Baton bearer: Finau Ohuafi
- Medals Ranked =36th: Gold 0 Silver 0 Bronze 1 Total 1

Commonwealth Games appearances (overview)
- 1974; 1978; 1982; 1986; 1990; 1994; 1998; 2002; 2006; 2010; 2014; 2018; 2022; 2026; 2030

Tonga competed at the 2026 Commonwealth Games in Glasgow, Scotland. This marked Tonga's 12th participation at the games, after making its debut at the 1974 Commonwealth Games.

The King's Baton relay stopped in Tonga in February 2026.

The Tongan team is consisted of 28 athletes competing in eight sports. Netball athlete Hulita Veve was named as the country's flagbearer at the opening ceremony. Meanwhile, swimmer Finau Ohuafi was the baton bearer during the opening ceremony.

Tonga won one bronze medal (in the sport of judo). This marked the country's first medal since 2010.

== Competitors ==
The following is the list of number of competitors expected to participate at the Games per sport/discipline.

Sport	Men	Women	Total
3x3 basketball	0	4	4
Athletics	1	1	2
Bowls	2	2	4
Boxing	1	0	1
Judo	1	0	1
Netball	—N/a	12	12
Swimming	1	1	2
Weightlifting	2	0	2
Total	8	20	28

== Medallist ==
The following Tongan competitor a won medal at the games. In the by discipline sections below, medallists' names are bolded.

Medal	Name	Sport	Event	Date	Ref.
Bronze	Monta Paula	Judo	Men's +100 kg	2 August	

== 3x3 basketball ==
Tonga qualified a women's 3x3 basketball team. This marked the country's debut in the discipline at the Commonwealth Games.

Summary

Team	Event	Group stage						Play-in	Semi-final	Final / BM / CM	
Team	Event	Opposition Score	Opposition Score	Opposition Score	Opposition Score	Opposition Score	Rank	Opposition Score	Opposition Score	Opposition Score	Rank
Tonga women	Women's	Scotland; **W** 12–10	New Zealand; **L** 8–21	Papua New Guinea; **W** 12–10	Singapore; **W** 14–10	England; **L** 4–21	3 **Q**	Uganda; **L** 12–21	Did not advance		6

=== Women's tournament ===
Roster
The roster consisted of four athletes.

- Lesila Kefu Finau
- Mele Katokakala Finau
- Olivia Maumi Po'uliva'ati
- Finau Kalolaine Tonga

Group B

Pos	Team	Pld	W	L	PF	PA	PD	Qualification
1	New Zealand	5	5	0	105	54	+51	Direct to semi-finals
2	England	5	4	1	89	45	+44	Quarter-finals
3	Tonga	5	3	2	50	72	−22	Quarter-finals
4	Scotland (H)	5	2	3	73	67	+6	
5	Singapore	5	1	4	69	85	−16	
6	Papua New Guinea	5	0	5	33	96	−63	

Source: Glasgow 2026
Rules for classification: 1) Wins; 2) Head-to-head record; 3) Points scored.
(H) Hosts

25 July 2026
10:00

Report

Scotland	10–**12**	**Tonga**
Pts: Brown 7		Pts: L Finau, M Finau 5

SEC, Glasgow

25 July 2026
15:20

Report

**New Zealand**	**21**–8	Tonga
Pts: Pupuke-Robati 10		Pts: L Finau 5

SEC, Glasgow

25 July 2026
20:15

Report

**Tonga**	**12**–10	Papua New Guinea
Pts: M Finau 4		Pts: Asiba 6

SEC, Glasgow

27 July 2026
11:30

Report

Singapore	10–**14**	**Tonga**
Pts: Lai 4		Pts: L Finau 6

SEC, Glasgow

27 July 2026
18:40

Report

**England**	**21**–4	Tonga
Pts: Januszewska 8		Pts: M Finau 3

SEC, Glasgow

Play-in

28 July 2026
19:30

Report

**Uganda**	**21**–12	Tonga
Pts: Asinde 10		Pts: three players 4

SEC, Glasgow

== Athletics ==
Tonga selected two athletes, one of each gender, both of whom will compete in shot put.

Field events

Athlete	Event	Qualification		Final	
Athlete	Event	Distance	Rank	Distance	Rank
Penisimani Ta'e'iloa	Men's shot put	14.94	12 **q**	NM	
Ata Maama Tu'utafaiva	Women's shot put	—N/a		15.58	8

== Boxing ==
Tonga entered one male boxer.

Athlete	Event	Round of 32	Round of 16	Quarterfinals	Semifinals	Final	
Athlete	Event	Opposition Result	Opposition Result	Opposition Result	Opposition Result	Opposition Result	Rank
Joshua Tonga	Men's 80 kg	Thomas (TTO); **W** 5–0	Pappoe (GHA); **L** 2–3	Did not advance			

== Bowls ==
Tonga entered four bowlers, two of each gender.

Athlete	Event	Group Stage							Semi-final	Final / BM	
Athlete	Event	Opposition Score	Opposition Score	Opposition Score	Opposition Score	Opposition Score	Opposition Score	Rank	Opposition Score	Opposition Score	Rank
Liam Hill	Men's singles	McIlroy (NZL); **L** 0–2	Tafatu (NIU); **W** 2–0	Kelly (NIR); **L** 1–1*	Rittmuller (RSA); **W** 1*–1	Yuen (SGP); **L** 0–2	Graham (NFK); **L** 0–2	5	Did not advance		
Liam Hill; Chad Nathan	Men's pairs	Northern Ireland; **L** 0–2	New Zealand; **L** 0–2	Australia; **L** 1–1*	Fiji; **W** 1*–1	Pakistan; **W** 2–0	—N/a	4	Did not advance		
Milika Nathan	Women's singles	Wilson (NFK); **L** 1–1*	Moceiwai (FIJ); **W** 1.5–0.5	Mbugua (KEN); **L** 0–2	McGrouther (SCO); **W** 1*–1	Viljoen (NAM); **W** 2–0	—N/a	3	Did not advance		
Paris Baker; Milika Nathan	Women's pairs	South Africa; **W** 1*–1	England; **L** 1–1*	India; **L** 1–1*	Malta; **L** 1–1*	Namibia; **L** 0–2	—N/a	5	Did not advance		

== Judo ==
Tonga entered one male judoka.

Men

Athlete	Event	Round of 16	Quarterfinals	Semifinals	Repechage	Final / BM	
Athlete	Event	Opposition Result	Opposition Result	Opposition Result	Opposition Result	Opposition Result	Rank
**Paula Monta**	+100 kg	Quilindo (SEY); **W** 100s1–0	Andrews (NZL); **L** 0s2–101s1	—N/a	Whitehouse (WAL); **W** 100–1s1	Bessong (CAN); **W** 12s1–11s1	3rd place, bronze medalist(s)

== Netball ==
Tonga qualified as one of the top 11 eligible teams in the World Netball Rankings as of September 1, 2025. This marked the country's Commonwealth Games debut in the sport.

Summary

Team	Event	Group stage						Semifinal	Final / BM / Cl.	
Team	Event	Opposition Result	Opposition Result	Opposition Result	Opposition Result	Opposition Result	Rank	Opposition Result	Opposition Result	Rank
Tonga national team	Women's tournament	Australia; **L** 38–99	South Africa; **L** 42–96	Northern Ireland; **W** 58–52	England; **L** 32–94	Malawi; **L** 49–55	5	—N/a	Ninth place match Wales; **W** 63–53	9

Roster
The roster consisted of 12 athletes.

- Alice Cocker
- Emma Mateo
- Halaevalu Toutaiolepo
- Hulita Veve
- Isabella Fainga'anuku
- Luana Aukafolau
- Lavinia Lavea
- Leila Tu'inukuafe
- Marie Payn
- 'otolose Fainga'anuku
- Sovika Pousini
- Uneeq Palavi

Group stage

Pos	Team	Pld	W	D	L	GF	GA	GD	Pts	Qualification
1	Australia	5	5	0	0	378	191	+187	10	Semi-finals
2	England	5	4	0	1	355	224	+131	8	Semi-finals
3	South Africa	5	3	0	2	340	231	+109	6	Classification matches
4	Malawi	5	2	0	3	233	303	−70	4	Classification matches
5	Tonga	5	1	0	4	219	396	−177	2	Classification matches
6	Northern Ireland	5	0	0	5	191	371	−180	0	Classification matches

Source: Glasgow 2026

25 July 2026; 11:00	Report	**Australia**	**99**–38	Tonga	OVO Hydro; Umpires: Angela Armstrong-Lush, Tracy-Ann Griffiths; Reserve umpire: Louise Travis
25 July 2026; 11:00	Report	Scoring by quarter: **23**–12, **28**–7, **23**–9, **25**–10			OVO Hydro; Umpires: Angela Armstrong-Lush, Tracy-Ann Griffiths; Reserve umpire: Louise Travis
25 July 2026; 11:00	Report	Cara Koenen 31/31 (100%); Sophie Garbin 31/34 (91%); Kiera Austin 20/21 (95%); Sophie Dwyer 17/19 (89%)		Uneeq Palavi 30/35 (86%); Marie Payn 3/3 (100%); Lavinia Lavea 3/6 (50%); Sovika Pousini 2/2 (100%)	OVO Hydro; Umpires: Angela Armstrong-Lush, Tracy-Ann Griffiths; Reserve umpire: Louise Travis

26 July 2026; 16:00	Report	**South Africa**	**96**–42	Tonga	OVO Hydro; Umpires: Justin Barnes, Gareth Fowler; Reserve umpire: Alison Harrison
26 July 2026; 16:00	Report	Scoring by quarter: **26**–15, **25**–8, **21**–12, **24**–7			OVO Hydro; Umpires: Justin Barnes, Gareth Fowler; Reserve umpire: Alison Harrison
26 July 2026; 16:00	Report	Rolene Streutker 51/58 (88%); Owethu Ngubane 34/40 (85%); Kamogelo Maseko 11/12 (92%)		Uneeq Palavi 29/32 (91%); Marie Payn 6/7 (86%); Sovika Pousini 6/8 (75%); Lavinia Lavea 1/2 (50%)	OVO Hydro; Umpires: Justin Barnes, Gareth Fowler; Reserve umpire: Alison Harrison

27 July 2026; 16:00	Report	**Tonga**	**58**–52	Northern Ireland	OVO Hydro; Umpires: Kate Mann, Tracy-Ann Griffiths; Reserve umpire: Bronwen Adams
27 July 2026; 16:00	Report	Scoring by quarter: **15**–11, **16**–15, **14**–11, 15–**15**			OVO Hydro; Umpires: Kate Mann, Tracy-Ann Griffiths; Reserve umpire: Bronwen Adams
27 July 2026; 16:00	Report	Uneeq Palavi 49/50 (98%); Marie Payn 7/7 (100%); Sovika Pousini 2/4 (50%)		Lisa Bowman 32/41 (78%); Emma Magee 9/13 (69%); Georgie McGraith 8/11 (73%); Orlaith Rogers 3/3 (100%)	OVO Hydro; Umpires: Kate Mann, Tracy-Ann Griffiths; Reserve umpire: Bronwen Adams

29 July 2026; 16:00	Report	**England**	**94**–32	Tonga	OVO Hydro; Umpires: Alison Harrison, Ken Metekingi; Reserve umpire: Tracy-Ann Griffiths
29 July 2026; 16:00	Report	Scoring by quarter: **27**–8, **18**–6, **24**–11, **25**–7			OVO Hydro; Umpires: Alison Harrison, Ken Metekingi; Reserve umpire: Tracy-Ann Griffiths
29 July 2026; 16:00	Report	Eleanor Cardwell 54/59 (92%); Sasha Glasgow 18/23 (78%); Ella Clark 12/15 (80%); Olivia Tchine 10/11 (91%)		Uneeq Palavi 27/30 (90%); Lavinia Lavea 4/6 (67%); Marie Payn 1/2 (50%)	OVO Hydro; Umpires: Alison Harrison, Ken Metekingi; Reserve umpire: Tracy-Ann Griffiths

30 July 2026; 09:00	Report	**Malawi**	**55**–49	Tonga	OVO Hydro; Umpires: Louise Travis, Alison Harrison; Reserve umpire: Tania Fink
30 July 2026; 09:00	Report	Scoring by quarter: 14–**15**, **15**–11, **14**–13, **12**–10			OVO Hydro; Umpires: Louise Travis, Alison Harrison; Reserve umpire: Tania Fink
30 July 2026; 09:00	Report	Mwayi Kumwenda 45/46 (98%); Ethel Ng'ambi 10/11 (91%)		Uneeq Palavi 35/37 (95%); Marie Payn 11/11 (100%); Sovika Pousini 3/4 (75%)	OVO Hydro; Umpires: Louise Travis, Alison Harrison; Reserve umpire: Tania Fink

Ninth place match

31 July 2026; 11:00	Report	**Tonga**	**63**–53	Wales	OVO Hydro; Umpires: Angela Armstrong-Lush, Louise Travis; Reserve umpire: Gareth Fowler
31 July 2026; 11:00	Report	Scoring by quarter: 10–**14**, **19**–15, **19**–9, 15–15			OVO Hydro; Umpires: Angela Armstrong-Lush, Louise Travis; Reserve umpire: Gareth Fowler
31 July 2026; 11:00	Report	Uneeq Palavi 49/52 (94%); Marie Payn 14/14 (100%)		Georgia Rowe 35/36 (97%); Phillipa Yarranton 18/20 (90%)	OVO Hydro; Umpires: Angela Armstrong-Lush, Louise Travis; Reserve umpire: Gareth Fowler

== Swimming ==
Tonga entered two swimmers, one per gender.

Athlete	Event	Heat		Semifinal		Final	
Athlete	Event	Time	Rank	Time	Rank	Time	Rank
Finau Ohuafi	Men's 50 m freestyle	24.42	43	Did not advance			
Finau Ohuafi	Men's 100 m freestyle	54.54	53	Did not advance			
Finau Ohuafi	Men's 50 m butterfly	25.60	41	Did not advance			
Finau Ohuafi	Men's 100 m butterfly	1:00.38	34	Did not advance			
Vaoahi Afu	Women's 50 m freestyle	29.63	58	Did not advance			
Vaoahi Afu	Women's 50 m breaststroke	35.86	34	Did not advance			
Vaoahi Afu	Women's 100 m breaststroke	1:20.66	26	Did not advance			

== Weightlifting ==
On 18 May 2026, the IWF Commonwealth Games weightlifting ranking lists were finalised. The top eight ranked lifters, limited to one per CGA, and not including Scotland (who got automatic host spots) and the directly qualified reigning Commonwealth Weightlifting champions, gained a quota place for the games in their weight class. Tonga qualified one male lifter, and were awarded a second on reallocation.

Men

Athlete	Event	Snatch (kg)		Clean & Jerk (kg)		Total (kg)	Rank
Athlete	Event	Result	Rank	Result	Rank	Total (kg)	Rank
Joshua Uikilifi Jr.	110 kg	146	6	185	4	331	4
Sikoti Manumua Jr	+110 kg	145	3	185	5	330	5
