= Bowls at the 2026 Commonwealth Games – Men's pairs =

Bowls event

Bowls men's pairs at the 2026 Commonwealth Games
- Venue: SEC Centre
- Dates: 28 July – 3 August 2026
- Competitors: 48 from 24 nations

Medalists
gold medal	Gary Kelly; Adam McKeown	Northern Ireland
silver medal	Nick Brett; Jamie Walker	England
bronze medal	Soufi Rusli; Amirul D Rahim	Malaysia

Bowls at the 2026 Commonwealth Games – Men's pairs was held at the SEC Centre in Glasgow from 28 July to 3 August. Twenty four nations entered the event. Northern Ireland's Gary Kelly and Adam McKeown won the gold medal, defeating Nick Brett and Jamie Walker of England on a tiebreak end in the final. Soufi Rusli and Amirul D Rahim from Malaysia won the bronze medal.

== Sectional play ==
The top team from each section advances to the knockout stage.

=== Section A ===
Rank	Athlete	MP	MW	MT	ML	FR	AG	PD	PTS
1	Soufi Rusli / Amirul D Rahim (MAS) (Q)	5	5	0	0	50	35	+15	15
2	Jason Greenslade / Ian Merrien (GGY)	5	3	0	2	63	39	+24	9
3	Ross Davis / Malcolm De Sousa (JEY)	5	3	0	2	40	36	+4	9
4	Troy Lorimer / Shaun Parnis (MLT)	5	2	0	3	49	43	+6	6
5	Ross Owen / Daniel Salmon (WAL)	5	2	0	3	44	38	–+6	6
6	Keith Tipani / Tifaga Tupuiliu (NIU)	5	0	0	5	20	75	−55	0

	Wales	Niue	Guernsey	Malta	Malaysia	Jersey
Wales	—	2–0	1^{*}–1	1–1^{*}	0–2	0–2
Niue	0–2	—	0–2	0–2	0–2	1–1^{*}
Guernsey	1–1^{*}	2–0	—	2–0	0.5–1.5	2–0
Malta	1^{*}–1	2–0	0–2	—	1–1^{*}	1–1^{*}
Malaysia	2–0	2–0	1.5–0.5	1^{*}–1	—	1^{*}–1
Jersey	2–0	1^{*}–1	0–2	1^{*}–1	1–1^{*}	—

=== Section B ===
Rank	Athlete	MP	MW	MT	ML	FR	AG	PD	PTS
1	Nick Brett / Jamie Walker (ENG) (Q)	5	5	0	0	63	30	+33	15
2	Navneet Singh / Dinesh Kumar (IND)	5	4	0	1	54	32	+22	12
3	Ronald Steenkamp / Waylon Wentzel (NAM)	5	3	0	2	48	42	+6	9
4	Oliver Thompson / Ian Barnes (FLK)	5	2	0	3	37	63	−26	6
5	M Mphotho / Charles Diteko (BOT)	5	1	0	4	28	53	−25	3
6	Jason Lindsay / Epii Poila (COK)	5	0	0	5	37	47	–10	0

	England	Falkland Islands	Botswana	Cook Islands	Namibia	India
England	—	2–0	2–0	1–1^{*}	2–0	1–1^{*}
Falkland Islands	0–2	—	1.5–0.5	2–0	0.5–1.5	0–2
Botswana	0–2	0.5–1.5	—	1.5–0.5	0–2	1–1^{*}
Cook Islands	1–1^{*}	0–2	0.5–1.5	—	1–1^{*}	1–1^{*}
Namibia	0–2	1.5–0.5	2–0	1^{*}–1	—	0–2
India	1–1^{*}	2–0	1^{*}–1	1^{*}–1	2–0	—

=== Section C ===
Rank	Athlete	MP	MW	MT	ML	FR	AG	PD	PTS
1	Ryan Bester / John Bezear (CAN) (Q)	5	5	0	0	51	33	+18	15
2	Alex Marshall / Paul Foster (SCO)	5	4	0	1	61	21	+40	12
3	Jason Evans / Paul Anthony (RSA)	5	3	0	2	47	38	+9	9
4	Jeht Nobbs / Micheal Trickey (NFI)	5	2	0	3	32	48	–16	6
5	Michael Collister / Mark McGreal (IOM)	5	1	0	4	38	47	–9	3
6	Anwar Hamada / Chris Kimanga (KEN)	5	0	0	5	26	68	–42	0

	Scotland	Kenya	Norfolk Island	Isle of Man	South Africa	Canada
Scotland	—	2–0	2–0	2–0	2–0	1–1*
Kenya	0–2	—	0–2	0–2	0–2	0–2
Norfolk Island	0–2	2–0	—	1.5–0.5	0–2	0–2
Isle of Man	0–2	2–0	0.5–1.5	—	0–2	1–1*
South Africa	0–2	2–0	2–0	2–0	—	1–1*
Canada	1*–1	2–0	2–0	1*–1	1*–1	—

=== Section D ===
Rank	Athlete	MP	MW	MT	ML	FR	AG	PD	PTS
1	Gary Kelly / Adam McKeown (NIR) (Q)	5	5	0	0	61	19	+42	15
2	Ali Forsyth / Tony Grantham (NZL)	5	4	0	1	46	24	+22	12
3	Aaron Teys / Corey Wedlock (AUS)	5	3	0	2	47	29	+18	9
4	Chad Nathan / Liam Hill (TGA)	5	2	0	3	36	56	–20	6
5	Lal Prasad / Surendra Prasad (FIJ)	5	1	0	4	27	46	–19	3
6	Maqsood Khan / Mohammed Qureshi (PAK)	5	0	0	5	30	73	–43	0

	Northern Ireland	Tonga	Pakistan	New Zealand	Fiji	Australia
Northern Ireland	—	2–0	2–0	1*–1	2–0	1.5–0.5
Tonga	0–2	—	2–0	0–2	1*–1	1–1*
Pakistan	0–2	0–2	—	0–2	1–1*	0–2
New Zealand	1–1*	2–0	2–0	—	1*–1	1*–1
Fiji	0–2	1–1*	1*–1	1–1*	—	0–2
Australia	0.5–1.5	1*–1	2–0	1–1*	2–0	—

== Knockout stage ==
Semifinals
Malaysia	1
Northern Ireland	1*
England	2
Canada	0

Final
Northern Ireland	1*
England	1
Bronze final
Malaysia	1.5
Canada	0.5
