= Zambia at the 2026 Commonwealth Games =

- Flag of Zambia
- CG code: ZAM
- CGA: Commonwealth Games Association of Zambia
- Website: nocz.org

in Glasgow, Scotland 23 July 2026 – 2 August 2026
- Competitors: 22 in 5 sports
- Flag bearer: Muzala Samukonga
- Baton bearer: Catherine Mwape
- Medals Ranked =33rd: Gold 0 Silver 0 Bronze 2 Total 2

Commonwealth Games appearances (overview)
- 1954; 1958; 1962–1966; 1970; 1974; 1978; 1982; 1986; 1990; 1994; 1998; 2002; 2006; 2010; 2014; 2018; 2022; 2026; 2030

Other related appearances
- Rhodesia and Nyasaland (1962)

Zambia competed at the 2026 Commonwealth Games in Glasgow, Scotland. This marked Zambia's 16th participation at the games, after making its debut at the 1954 Commonwealth Games.

The Zambian team was expected to compete five sports and consist of 22 athletes. The official team of 22 athletes (11 men and 11 women) competing in five sports was named in June 2026.

Sprinter Muzala Samukonga was the country's flagbearer during the opening ceremony. Meanwhile, boxer Catherine Mwape was the baton bearer during the opening ceremony.

The Zambian team won two bronze medals, both in boxing to finish tied for 33rd on the medal table.

== Competitors ==
The following is the list of number of competitors participating at the Games per sport/discipline.

Sport	Men	Women	Total
Athletics	3	3	6
Bowls	0	3	3
Boxing	3	1	4
Judo	3	2	5
Swimming	2	2	4
Total	11	11	22

== Medallists ==
The following competitors won a medal at the games. In the by discipline sections below, medallists' names are bolded.

Medal	Name	Sport	Event	Date	Ref.
Bronze	Catherine Mwape	Boxing	Women's 54 kg	31 July	
Bronze	Emmanuel Katema	Boxing	Men's 65 kg	31 July	

== Athletics ==
Zambia entered six athletes, three per gender.

Key

Ranks given for track events are within the athlete's heat only.

- **Q** = Qualified for the next round
- **q** = Qualified for the next round as a fastest loser or, in field events, by position without achieving the qualifying target

Track events

Athlete	Event	Heat		Semifinal		Final	
Athlete	Event	Result	Rank	Result	Rank	Result	Rank
Kennedy Luchembe	Men's 400 m	46.44	4 **q**	46.60	7	Did not advance	
Patrick Nyambe	Men's 400 m	45.94	4 **q**	46.46	6	Did not advance	
Muzala Samukonga	Men's 400 m	—N/a		45.95	2 **Q**	45.61	6
Edna Ng'Andula	Women's 100 m	11.48	3 **q**	11.64	7	Did not advance	
Edna Ng'Andula	Women's 200 m	DQ		Did not advance			
Emeldah Kapunjila	Women's 400 m	56.87	8	Did not advance			
Niddy Mingilishi	Women's 400 m	54.04	4 **q**	55.01	7	Did not advance	
Kennedy Luchembe; Patrick Nyambe; Emeldah Kapunjila; Niddy Mingilishi	Mixed 4 × 400 m relay	3:21.72	4 **q**	—N/a		DNF	

== Bowls ==
Zambia entered three female bowlers.

Athlete	Event	Group Stage							Semifinal	Final / BM	
Athlete	Event	Opposition Score	Opposition Score	Opposition Score	Opposition Score	Opposition Score	Opposition Score	Rank	Opposition Score	Opposition Score	Rank
Mildred Mkandawire	Women's singles	Saroji (MAS); **L** 0–2	Saikia (IND); **L** 0–2	Herselman (RSA); **L** 0–2	Williams (WAL); **L** 0–2	Whitehead (IOM); **W** 2–0	—N/a	5	Did not advance		
Foster Banda; Getrude Siame	Women's pairs	Australia; **L** 0–2	Isle of Man; **W** 1*–1	Guernsey; **L** 0–2	Niue; **W** 1.5–0.5	Northern Ireland; **L** 0–2	Singapore; **L** 1–1*	5	Did not advance		

== Boxing ==
Zambia entered four boxer (three men and one woman).

Athlete	Event	Preliminaries	Preliminaries	Quarterfinal	Semifinal	Final	
Athlete	Event	Opposition Result	Opposition Result	Opposition Result	Opposition Result	Opposition Result	Rank
Mwengo Mwale	Men's 55 kg	Fake (SOL); **W** RSC	Sigwela (RSA); **W** 4–0	Singh (IND); **L** 0–5	Did not advance		
Albert Ngulube	Men's 60 kg	Kemis (UGA); **W** 5–0	Dlamini (SWZ); **W** 5–0	Gallagher (NIR); **L** 2–3	Did not advance		
**Emmanuel Katema**	Men's 65 kg	Pathmasiri (SRI); **W** KO	Church (SCO); **W** 4–0	Bonzo (MAW); **W** RSC	Mughalzai (ENG); **L** 1–4	Did not advance	3rd place, bronze medalist(s)
**Catherine Mwape**	Women's 54 kg	Bye	Zahid (PAK); **W** 4–1	Gabriel (MRI); **W** 3–2	Pawar (IND); **L** 0–5	Did not advance	3rd place, bronze medalist(s)

== Judo ==
Zambia entered five judoka (three men and two women).

Athlete	Event	Preliminaries	Round of 16	Quarterfinal	Semifinal	Repechage	Final / BM	
Athlete	Event	Opposition Result	Opposition Result	Opposition Result	Opposition Result	Opposition Result	Opposition Result	Rank
Simon Zulu	Men's 66 kg	Bye	Christodoulidis (CYP); **L** 000s3–100s1	Did not advance				
John Kapungwe	Men's 73 kg	Repiyallage (SRI); **L** 010–011s2	Did not advance					
Andrew Sande	Men's 90 kg	—N/a	Feuillet (MRI); **L** 000s2–100	Did not advance				
Sylvia Nawila	Women's 57 kg	—N/a	Walton (BAR); **W** 100–000	Breytenbach (RSA); **L** 000–100	Did not advance	Agyei (GHA); **L** 001–100	Did not advance	7
Rita Kabinda	Women's 63 kg	—N/a	Semple (JAM); **W** 100–000s1	Coughlan (AUS); **W** 011s1–000	Biron (CAN); **L** 000s1–101	Bye	Ekuta (NGR); **L** 000s1–110s1	5

== Swimming ==
Zambia entered four swimmers (two per gender).

Athlete	Event	Heat		Semifinal		Final	
Athlete	Event	Time	Rank	Time	Rank	Time	Rank
Sumbwanyambe Shamambo	Men's 50 m freestyle	23.36	22	Did not advance			
Sumbwanyambe Shamambo	Men's 50 m breaststroke	29.26	33	Did not advance			
Sumbwanyambe Shamambo	Men's 50 m butterfly	25.06	32	Did not advance			
Zach Moyo	Men's 50 m breaststroke	28.62	21	Did not advance			
Zach Moyo	Men's 100 m breaststroke	1:05.01	24	Did not advance			
Jade Phiri	Women's 50 m freestyle	27.49	37	Did not advance			
Jade Phiri	Women's 50 m butterfly	28.48	26	Did not advance			
Mia Phiri	Women's 50 m freestyle	26.32	20	Did not advance			
Mia Phiri	Women's 50 m backstroke	29.83	19	Did not advance			
Mia Phiri	Women's 50 m butterfly	28.02	22	Did not advance			
