= Bowls at the 2026 Commonwealth Games – Men's singles =

Bowls event

Bowls men's singles at the 2026 Commonwealth Games
- Venue: SEC Centre
- Dates: 23 July – 28 July 2026
- Competitors: 26 from 26 nations

Medalists
gold medal	Sam Tolchard	England
silver medal	Izzat Dzulkeple	Malaysia
bronze medal	Gary Kelly	Northern Ireland

Bowls at the 2026 Commonwealth Games – Men's singles was held at the SEC Centre in Glasgow from 23 to 28 July. Twenty six nations entered the event. Sam Tolchard of England won the gold medal, defeating Malaysia's Izzat Dzulkeple in the final. Gary Kelly from Northern Ireland won the bronze medal.

== Sectional play ==
The top bowler from each section advances to the knockout stage.

=== Section A ===
Rank	Athlete	MP	MW	MT	ML	FR	AG	PD	PTS
1	Aaron Wilson (AUS) (Q)	6	6	0	0	108	39	+69	18
2	Mark McGreal (IOM)	6	4	0	2	89	56	+33	12
3	Jason Greenslade (GGY)	6	4	0	2	90	60	+30	12
4	Royden Aperau (COK)	6	4	0	2	65	78	-13	12
5	Waylon Wentzel (NAM)	6	2	0	4	61	83	−22	6
6	Taylor Greechan (JEY)	6	1	0	5	60	82	−22	3
7	Diza Mphotho (BOT)	6	0	0	6	40	115	−75	0

	Australia	Guernsey	Namibia	Botswana	Isle of Man	Cook Islands	Jersey
Australia	—	1.5–0.5	2–0	2–0	2–0	2–0	2–0
Guernsey	0.5–1.5	—	2–0	2–0	1–1*	0–2	2–0
Namibia	0–2	0–2	—	1.5–0.5	0–2	1–1*	1-1*
Botswana	0–2	0–2	0.5–1.5	—	0.5–1.5	0–2	1–1*
Isle of Man	2–0	1*–1	2–0	1.5–0.5	—	2–0	2–0
Cook Islands	0-2	0-2	1*–1	2–0	0-2	—	1*–1
Jersey	0–2	0–2	1–1*	1–1*	0–2	1–1*	—

=== Section B ===
Rank	Athlete	MP	MW	MT	ML	FR	AG	PD	PTS
1	Gary Kelly (NIR) (Q)	6	6	0	0	109	48	+61	18
2	Shannon McIlroy (NZL)	6	5	0	1	86	60	+26	15
3	Wayne Rittmuller (RSA)	6	3	0	3	85	68	+17	9
4	Mitchell Graham (NFI)	6	3	0	3	76	68	+8	9
5	Liam Hill (TGA)	6	2	0	4	62	87	–25	6
6	Harriman Yuen (SGP)	6	2	0	4	57	83	−26	6
7	Frederrick Tatafu (NIU)	6	0	0	6	42	103	–61	0

	New Zealand	Tonga	Northern Ireland	Niue	South Africa	Singapore	Norfolk Island
New Zealand	—	2–0	0–2	1–1*	1–1*	1.5–0.5	1.5–0.5
Tonga	0–2	—	1-1*	2–0	1–1*	0–2	0–2
Northern Ireland	2–0	1-1*	—	2–0	2–0	2–0	1–1*
Niue	1–1*	0–2	0–2	—	0–2	0–2	0–2
South Africa	1–1*	1–1*	0–2	2–0	—	2–0	2–0
Singapore	0.5–1.5	2–0	0–2	2–0	0–2	—	1–1*
Norfolk Island	0.5–1.5	2–0	1–1*	2–0	0–2	1–1*	—

=== Section C ===
Rank	Athlete	MP	MW	MT	ML	FR	AG	PD	PTS
1	Sam Tolchard (ENG) (Q)	5	4	0	1	94	34	60	12
2	Jason Banks (SCO)	5	3	0	2	76	46	+30	9
3	Rajnesh Prasad (FIJ)	5	3	0	2	59	62	-3	9
4	Ross Owen (WAL)	5	3	0	2	86	46	+40	9
5	Mohammed Qureshi (PAK)	5	2	0	3	50	95	−45	6
6	Robert Simpson (JAM)	5	0	0	5	28	110	−82	0

	Wales	Pakistan	England	Jamaica	Scotland	Fiji
Wales	—	2–0	0–2	0–2	0–2	2–0
Pakistan	0–2	—	0–2	2–0	0–2	2–0
England	2–0	2–0	—	2–0	2–0	1–1*
Jamaica	2–0	0–2	0–2	—	0–2	0–2
Scotland	2–0	2–0	0–2	2–0	—	1–1*
Fiji	0–2	0–2	1*–1	2–0	1*–1	—

=== Section D ===
Rank	Athlete	MP	MW	MT	ML	FR	AG	PD	PTS
1	Izzat Dzulkeple (MAS)	5	5	0	0	78	50	+28	15
2	Shaun James Parnis (MLT)	5	3	0	2	68	51	+17	9
3	Ryan Bester (CAN)	5	2	0	3	66	54	+12	6
4	Putul Sonowal (IND)	5	2	0	3	55	71	−16	6
5	Cecil Alexander (FLK)	5	2	0	3	55	54	+1	3
6	Anwar Hamada (KEN)	5	1	0	4	43	85	–42	3

	Canada	India	Kenya	Malta	Falkland Islands	Malaysia
Canada	—	1–1*	2–0	2–0	1*–1	1–1*
India	1*–1	—	0.5−1.5	0.5−1.5	1*–1	0–2
Kenya	0−2	1.5−0.5	—	0−2	0−2	0–2
Malta	2–0	1.5−0.5	2−0	—	0–2	0.5−1.5
Falkland Islands	1–1*	1–1*	2–0	2–0	—	0–2
Malaysia	1*–1	2–0	2–0	1.5−0.5	2–0	—

== Knockout stage ==
Semifinals
Aaron Wilson (AUS)	1
Izzat Dzulkeple (MAS)	1*
Sam Tolchard (ENG)	2
Gary Kelly (NIR)	0

Final
Izzat Dzulkeple (MAS)	0
Sam Tolchard (ENG)	2
Bronze final
Aaron Wilson (AUS)	0.5
Gary Kelly (NIR)	1.5
