= Jersey at the 2026 Commonwealth Games =

- Flag of Jersey
- CG code: JEY
- CGA: Commonwealth Games Association of Jersey
- Website: cgaj.org

in Glasgow, Scotland 23 July 2026 – 2 August 2026
- Competitors: 22 in 5 sports
- Flag bearer: Malcolm De Sousa
- Baton bearer: Lucy Woodward
- Medals Ranked =17th: Gold 1 Silver 1 Bronze 0 Total 2

Commonwealth Games appearances (overview)
- 1958; 1962; 1966; 1970; 1974; 1978; 1982; 1986; 1990; 1994; 1998; 2002; 2006; 2010; 2014; 2018; 2022; 2026; 2030

Jersey competed at the 2026 Commonwealth Games in Glasgow, Scotland. This marked Jersey's 18th participation at the games, after making its debut at the 1958 Commonwealth Games.

In April 2026, it was announced Jean Cross would be the team's chef de mission, for the third games in a row.

On May 29 2026 the Commonwealth Games Association of Jersey announced a squad of 21 athletes, headed by world junior swimming champion, Filip Nowacki. In June, the team increased to 22 athletes as weightlifter Oliver Dodds was given a bipartie quota spot to compete at the games.

Bowler Malcolm De Sousa was the flagbearer, and heptathlete Lucy Woodward the baton bearer, for the opening ceremony.

On 25 July, swimmer Filip Nowacki won a silver medal in the 100 metre breaststroke, the territory's first medal at the Commonwealth Games in 36 years. Three days later he won the gold medal in the 200 metre breaststroke to become the islands' most decorated athlete in Commonwealth Games history.

== Competitors ==
The following is the list of number of competitors participating at the Games per sport/discipline.

| Sport | Men | Women | Total |
|---|---|---|---|
| Athletics | 4 | 1 | 5 |
| Bowls | 3 | 3 | 6 |
| Judo | 1 | 0 | 1 |
| Swimming | 6 | 3 | 9 |
| Weightlifting | 1 | 0 | 1 |
| Total | 15 | 7 | 22 |

== Medallist ==
The following competitor won a medal at the games. In the by discipline sections below, medallists' names are bolded.

| Medal | Name | Sport | Event | Date | Ref. |
|---|---|---|---|---|---|
| Gold | Filip Nowacki | Swimming | 200 metre breaststroke | 28 July | |
| Silver | Filip Nowacki | Swimming | 100 metre breaststroke | 25 July | |

Medals by sport
| **Sport** | 1st place, gold medalist(s) | 2nd place, silver medalist(s) | 3rd place, bronze medalist(s) | **Total** |
| Athletics | 0 | 0 | 0 | 0 |
| Bowls | 0 | 0 | 0 | 0 |
| Judo | 0 | 0 | 0 | 0 |
| Swimming | 1 | 1 | 0 | 2 |
| Weightlifting | 0 | 0 | 0 | 0 |
| Total | 1 | 1 | 0 | 2 |

Medals by gender
| **Gender** | 1st place, gold medalist(s) | 2nd place, silver medalist(s) | 3rd place, bronze medalist(s) | **Total** |
| Male | 1 | 1 | 0 | 2 |
| Female | 0 | 0 | 0 | 0 |
| Mixed | 0 | 0 | 0 | 0 |
| Total | 1 | 1 | 0 | 2 |

Multiple medalists
| Name | Sport | 1st place, gold medalist(s) | 2nd place, silver medalist(s) | 3rd place, bronze medalist(s) | Total |
| Filip Nowacki | Swimming | 1 | 1 | 0 | **2** |

== Athletics ==
The Jersey team consisted of five track and field athletes (four men and one woman).

Key

Ranks given for track events are within the athlete's heat only.

- **Q** = Qualified for the next round
- **q** = Qualified for the next round as a fastest loser or, in field events, by position without achieving the qualifying target

Men

| Athlete | Event | Heat | | Semifinal | | Final | |
| Athlete | Event | Result | Rank | Result | Rank | Result | Rank |
|---|---|---|---|---|---|---|---|
| Steven Mackay | Men's 100 m | 10.68 | 5 | Did not advance | | | |
| Steven Mackay | Men's 200 m | 21.70 | 5 | Did not advance | | | |
| Jamie Oldham | Men's 100 m | 10.41 **PB** | 2 | Did not advance | | | |
| Jamie Oldham | Men's 200 m | 21.02 **PB** | 4 | Did not advance | | | |
| Zach Saunders | Men's 100 m | 10.72 | 5 | Did not advance | | | |
| Zach Saunders | Men's 200 m | 21.29 | 4 | Did not advance | | | |

Combined events – Decathlon

| Athlete | Event | 100 m | LJ | SP | HJ | 400 m | 110H | DT | PV | JT | 1500 m | Final | Rank |
|---|---|---|---|---|---|---|---|---|---|---|---|---|---|
| Evan Campbell | Result | 11.32 | 6.68 | 14.43 | 2.00 | 53.63 | DQ | 41.31 | 4.10 | 52.21 | 4:46.67 | 6339 | 12 |
| Evan Campbell | Points | 791 | 739 | 755 | 803 | 655 | 0 | 691 | 645 | 621 | 639 | 6339 | 12 |

Women
Combined events – Heptathlon

| Athlete | Event | 100H | HJ | SP | 200 m | LJ | JT | 800 m | Final | Rank |
|---|---|---|---|---|---|---|---|---|---|---|
| Lucy Woodward | Result | 14.05 | 1.64 | 11.33 | 25.25 | 5.82 | 34.62 | 2:11.94 | 5530 | 12 |
| Lucy Woodward | | 971 | 783 | 617 | 864 | 795 | 564 | 936 | 5530 | 12 |

== Bowls ==
Jersey entered six bowlers, three men and three women.

| Athlete | Event | Group Stage | | | | | | | Semifinal | Final / BM | |
| Athlete | Event | Opposition Score | Opposition Score | Opposition Score | Opposition Score | Opposition Score | Opposition Score | Rank | Opposition Score | Opposition Score | Rank |
|---|---|---|---|---|---|---|---|---|---|---|---|
| Taylor Greechan | Men's singles | McGreal (IOM); **L** 0–2 | Aperau (COK); **L** 1–1* | Mphotho (BOT); **W** 1*–1 | Wentzel (NAM); **L** 1–1* | Greenslade (GGY); **L** 0–2 | Wilson (AUS); **L** 0–2 | 6 | Did not advance | | |
| Ross Davis; Malcolm De Sousa | Men's pairs | Guernsey; **L** 0–2 | Malaysia; **L** 1–1* | Malta; **W** 1*–1 | Niue; **W** 1*–1 | Wales; **W** 2–0 | —N/a | 3 | Did not advance | | |
| Abbey Andrieux | Women's singles | Rednall (ENG); **L** 0–2 | McKerihen (CAN); **L** 0–2 | Fife (AUS); **L** 0–2 | Jim (COK); **L** 0–2 | Rixon (MLT); **L** 1–1* | Arthur-Almond (FLK); **L** 0–2 | 7 | Did not advance | | |
| Fiona Archibald; Sara Douglas | Women's pairs | Scotland; **W** 1*–1 | Malaysia; **L** 0–2 | Norfolk Island; **L** 0–2 | Cook Islands; **W** 2–0 | Falkland Islands; **W** 2–0 | —N/a | 4 | Did not advance | | |

== Judo ==
Jersey entered one male judoka. This marked the dependency's first appearance in judo at the Commonwealth Games since 1990.

| Athlete | Event | Round of 32 | Round of 16 | Quarterfinals | Semifinals | Repechage | Final/BM |
| Athlete | Event | Opposition Result | Opposition Result | Opposition Result | Opposition Result | Opposition Result | Rank |
|---|---|---|---|---|---|---|---|
| Steven Rabet | 66 kg | Bye | Balarjishvili (CYP); **L** 000–100 | Did not advance | | | |

== Swimming ==
Jersey entered nine swimmers, six men and three women. Filip Nowacki became the dependency's first ever Commonwealth Games medallist in swimming.

Men

| Athlete | Event | Heat | | Semifinal | | Final | |
| Athlete | Event | Time | Rank | Time | Rank | Time | Rank |
|---|---|---|---|---|---|---|---|
| Matthew Deffains | 50 m freestyle | 24.34 | 41 | Did not advance | | | |
| Matthew Deffains | 100 m freestyle | 52.58 | 41 | Did not advance | | | |
| Matthew Deffains | 200 m freestyle | 1:59.47 | 30 | —N/a | | Did not advance | |
| Isaac Dodds | 100 m butterfly | 56.01 | 27 | Did not advance | | | |
| Isaac Dodds | 200 m butterfly | DQ | | —N/a | | Did not advance | |
| Isaac Dodds | 200 m individual medley | 2:06.65 | 13 | —N/a | | Did not advance | |
| Oscar Dodds | 200 m freestyle | 2:00.06 | 31 | —N/a | | Did not advance | |
| Oscar Dodds | 50 m backstroke | 28.12 | 27 | Did not advance | | | |
| Oscar Dodds | 100 m backstroke | 59.57 | 19 | Did not advance | | | |
| Oscar Dodds | 200 m backstroke | 2:08.93 | 12 | —N/a | | Did not advance | |
| Oscar Dodds | 200 m individual medley | 2:09.20 | 16 | —N/a | | Did not advance | |
| **Filip Nowacki** | 50 m breaststroke | 27.29 | 6 **Q** | 27.22 | 6 **Q** | 27.20 | 5 |
| **Filip Nowacki** | 100 m breaststroke | 59.93 | 3 **Q** | 59.52 | 3 **Q** | 59.34 | 2nd place, silver medalist(s) |
| **Filip Nowacki** | 200 m breaststroke | 2:10.46 | 2 **Q** | —N/a | | 2:07.87 | 1st place, gold medalist(s) |
| Samuel Sterry | 200 m freestyle | 1:53.15 | 23 | —N/a | | Did not advance | |
| Samuel Sterry | 400 m freestyle | 4:00.72 | 17 | —N/a | | Did not advance | |
| Samuel Sterry | 800 m freestyle | —N/a | | | | 8:29.65 | 11 |
| Samuel Sterry | 200 m backstroke | 2:08.24 | 10 | —N/a | | Did not advance | |
| Samuel Sterry | 400 m individual medley | 4:30.74 | 10 | —N/a | | Did not advance | |
| Isaac Thompson | 50 m backstroke | 27.49 | 23 | Did not advance | | | |
| Isaac Thompson | 100 m backstroke | 58.02 | 16 **Q** | 58.28 | 15 | Did not advance | |
| Isaac Thompson | 200 m backstroke | 2:03.66 | 8 **Q** | —N/a | | 2:03.73 | 8 |
| Isaac Thompson | 400 m individual medley | DNS | | —N/a | | Did not advance | |
| Matthew Deffains; Isaac Dodds; Oscar Dodds; Samuel Sterry | 4 × 100 m freestyle relay | 3:30.12 | 10 | —N/a | | Did not advance | |
| Matthew Deffains; Isaac Dodds; Oscar Dodds; Samuel Sterry | 4 × 200 m freestyle relay | 7:40.99 | 7 **Q** | —N/a | | 7:36.90 | 7 |
| Isaac Dodds; Filip Nowacki; Samuel Sterry; Isaac Thompson | 4 × 100 m medley relay | 3:45.33 | 9 | —N/a | | Did not advance | |

Women & Mixed

| Athlete | Event | Heat | | Semifinal | | Final | |
| Athlete | Event | Time | Rank | Time | Rank | Time | Rank |
|---|---|---|---|---|---|---|---|
| Clara Ginnis | Women's 200 m freestyle | 2:08.15 | 23 | —N/a | | Did not advance | |
| Clara Ginnis | Women's 400 m freestyle | 4:26.73 | 20 | —N/a | | Did not advance | |
| Clara Ginnis | Women's 800 m freestyle | —N/a | | | | 9:20.49 | 16 |
| Clara Ginnis | Women's 1500 m freestyle | —N/a | | | | 17:36.94 | 11 |
| Clara Ginnis | Women's 200 m butterfly | 2:27.32 | 12 | —N/a | | Did not advance | |
| Clara Ginnis | Women's 400 m individual medley | 5:05.83 | 8 **Q** | —N/a | | 5:04.73 | 8 |
| Megan Hansford | Women's 50 m freestyle | 27.79 | 44 | Did not advance | | | |
| Megan Hansford | Women's 100 m freestyle | 1:00.77 | 42 | Did not advance | | | |
| Megan Hansford | Women's 50 m backstroke | 31.20 | 27 | Did not advance | | | |
| Megan Hansford | Women's 100 m backstroke | 1:05.48 | 23 | Did not advance | | | |
| Megan Hansford | Women's 200 m backstroke | 2:21.44 | 12 | —N/a | | Did not advance | |
| Megan Hansford | Women's 50 m butterfly | 29.21 | 37 | Did not advance | | | |
| Hannah Sterry | Women's 400 m freestyle | | | —N/a | | Did not advance | |
| Hannah Sterry | Women's 800 m freestyle | —N/a | | | | 9:15.37 | 15 |
| Hannah Sterry | Women's 1500 m freestyle | —N/a | | | | 17:41.15 | 12 |
| Hannah Sterry | Women's 100 m breaststroke | 1:17.65 | 25 | Did not advance | | | |
| Hannah Sterry | Women's 200 m breaststroke | DNS | | —N/a | | Did not advance | |
| Hannah Sterry | Women's 400 m individual medley | 5:09.85 | 9 | —N/a | | Did not advance | |
| Matthew Deffains; Samuel Sterry; Clara Ginnis; Megan Hansford | Mixed 4 × 100 m freestyle relay | 3:45.26 | 12 | —N/a | | Did not advance | |
| Isaac Dodds; Oscar Dodds; Megan Hansford; Hannah Sterry | Mixed 4 × 100 m medley relay | 4:15.14 | 14 | —N/a | | Did not advance | |

== Weightlifting ==
Jersey received a biapartie quota spot to enter one male athlete. This marked the country's return to the sport at the Commonwealth Games after last competing in 1962. Olly Dodds would go on to finish seventh in the men's 110 kg event.

| Athlete | Event | Snatch (kg) | | Clean & Jerk (kg) | | Total (kg) | Rank |
| Athlete | Event | Result | Rank | Result | Rank | Total (kg) | Rank |
|---|---|---|---|---|---|---|---|
| Olly Dodds | Men's 110 kg | 120 | 9 | 140 | 7 | 260 | 7 |
