= Isle of Man at the 2026 Commonwealth Games =

- Flag of the Isle of Man
- CG code: IOM
- CGA: Commonwealth Games Association of the Isle of Man
- Website: cga.im

in Glasgow, Scotland 23 July 2026 – 2 August 2026
- Competitors: 27 in 6 sports
- Flag bearer (opening): Alfie Bezance
- Baton bearer: Laura Kinley
- Flag bearer (closing): David Mullarkey
- Medals Ranked =20th: Gold 1 Silver 0 Bronze 1 Total 2

Commonwealth Games appearances (overview)
- 1958; 1962; 1966; 1970; 1974; 1978; 1982; 1986; 1990; 1994; 1998; 2002; 2006; 2010; 2014; 2018; 2022; 2026; 2030

The Isle of Man competed at the 2026 Commonwealth Games in Glasgow between 23 July and 2 August 2026. This was the Isle of Man's twenty-third appearance at the games.

The Commonwealth Association for the island announced an initial team of 22 for the Games. The final team consisted of 27 athletes (19 men and eight women) competing in six sports.

Para powerlifter Alfie Bezance was the country's opening ceremony flagbearer. Meanwhile, swimmer Laura Kinley was the baton bearer during the opening ceremony. Athlete David Mullarkey served as the country's closing ceremony flagbearer.

The Isle of Man won two medals, a gold and a bronze, to rank equal 20th on the medal table. Matthew Bostock won the dependency's first gold medal since 2006.

== Competitors ==
The following is the list of number of competitors participating at the Games per sport/discipline.

Sport	Men	Women	Total
Artistic gymnastics	1	0	1
Athletics	4	1	5
Bowls	2	2	4
Para powerlifting	1	0	1
Swimming	9	5	14
Track cycling	2	0	2
Total	19	8	27

== Medallists ==
The following competitors won medals at the games. In the by discipline sections below, medallists' names are bolded.

Medal	Name	Sport	Event	Date	Ref.
Gold	Matthew Bostock	Track cycling	Men's points race	2 August	
Bronze	David Mullarkey	Athletics	Men's 10,000 metres	28 July	

== Artistic gymnastics ==
The Isle of Man entered one male gymnast.

Men
Individual Qualification

Athlete	Event	Apparatus						Total	Rank
Athlete	Event	FL	PH	SR	VT	PB	HB	Total	Rank
Harry Eyres	All-around	11.650	10.700	10.350	12.800	10.950	10.100	66.550	23 **R1**

Individual final

Athlete	Event	Apparatus						Total	Rank
Athlete	Event	FL	PH	SR	VT	PB	HB	Total	Rank
Harry Eyres	All-around	11.850	10.950	10.900	10.550	10.950	9.800	65.000	16

== Athletics ==
The Isle of Man entered five athletes (four men and one woman). However in July, Sarah Astin withdrew. Astin was replaced by Christa Cain. David Mullarkey would win the dependency's first ever medal in athletics, a bronze in the men's 10,000 metres.

Key

Ranks given for track events are within the athlete's heat only.

- **Q** = Qualified for the next round
- **q** = Qualified for the next round as a fastest loser or, in field events, by position without achieving the qualifying target

Track events

Athlete	Event	Heat		Semifinal		Final	
Athlete	Event	Result	Rank	Result	Rank	Result	Rank
Jack Kinrade	Men's 800 m	1:53.30	6	Did not advance			
David Mullarkey	Men's 5000 m	—N/a				13:32.36	11
Ollie Lockley	Men's 10,000 m	—N/a				29:12.91 **PB**	14
**David Mullarkey**	Men's 10,000 m	—N/a				27:50.28	3rd place, bronze medalist(s)
Christa Cain	Women's 5000 m	—N/a				16:51.46 **PB**	19

Field events

Athlete	Event	Qualification		Final	
Athlete	Event	Distance	Rank	Distance	Rank
Regan Corrin	Men's high jump	—N/a		2.05	10
Regan Corrin	Men's long jump	7.84	5 **q**	7.46	10

== Bowls ==
The Isle of Man entered four bowlers (two men and two women).

Athlete	Event	Group Stage							Semifinal	Final / BM	
Athlete	Event	Opposition Score	Opposition Score	Opposition Score	Opposition Score	Opposition Score	Opposition Score	Rank	Opposition Score	Opposition Score	Rank
Mark McGreal	Men's singles	Greechan (JEY); **W** 2–0	Aperau (COK); **W** 2–0	Wilson (AUS); **L** 0–2	Mphotho (BOT); **W** 1.5–0.5	Wentzel (NAM); **W** 2–0	Greenslade (GGY); **L** 1–1*	2	Did not advance		
Michael Collister; Mark McGreal	Men's pairs	Canada; **L** 1–1*	Scotland; **L** 0–2	South Africa; **L** 0–2	Norfolk Island; **L** 0.5–1.5	Kenya; **W** 2–0	—N/a	5	Did not advance		
Caroline Whitehead	Women's singles	Saroji (MAS); **L** 0–2	Saikia (IND); **L** 0–2	Herselman (RSA); **L** 0–2	Williams (WAL); **L** 0–2	Mkandawire (ZAM); **L** 0–2	—N/a	5	Did not advance		
Paula Garrett; Caroline Whitehead	Women's pairs	Guernsey; **L** 0–2	Zambia; **L** 1–1*	Australia; **L** 0–2	Northern Ireland; **L** 0–2	Singapore; **L** 0–2	Niue; **W** 2–0	6	Did not advance		

== Para powerlifting ==
The Isle of Man entered one male para powerlifter.

Athlete	Event	Lift (kg)	Points	Rank
Alfie Bezance	Men's heavyweight	172	110.9	9

== Swimming ==
The Isle of Man entered 14 swimmers (nine men and five women).

Men

Athlete	Event	Heat		Semifinal		Final	
Athlete	Event	Time	Rank	Time	Rank	Time	Rank
Peter Allen	200 m freestyle	DNS		—N/a		Did not advance	
Peter Allen	50 m butterfly	25.15	34	Did not advance			
Peter Allen	100 m butterfly	55.90	26	Did not advance			
Zachary Bellhouse	50 m breaststroke	31.09	46	Did not advance			
Zachary Bellhouse	100 m breaststroke	1:09.31	37	Did not advance			
Charles Foster	50 m backstroke	28.22	28	Did not advance			
Charles Foster	100 m backstroke	59.72	20	Did not advance			
Charles Foster	200 m backstroke	2:08.59	11	—N/a		Did not advance	
Magnus Kelly	50 m freestyle	24.03	36	—N/a			
Magnus Kelly	100 m freestyle	52.33	36	—N/a			
Magnus Kelly	200 m freestyle	DNS		—N/a		Did not advance	
Oscar Maddrell	400 m freestyle	4:14.49	20	—N/a		Did not advance	
Oscar Maddrell	800 m freestyle	—N/a				8:40.24	12
Oscar Maddrell	1500 m freestyle	—N/a				16:34.50	9
Connor Mealin	50 m breaststroke	30.29	39	Did not advance			
Harry Robinson	50 m freestyle	23.32	21	Did not advance			
Harry Robinson	100 m freestyle	51.18	30	Did not advance			
Harry Robinson	50 m backstroke	26.16	17 **R**	Did not advance			
Harry Robinson	100 m backstroke	1:00.50	21	Did not advance			
Harry Robinson	50 m butterfly	24.93	27	Did not advance			
Alexander Turnbull	50 m breaststroke	28.51	18 **R**	Did not advance			
Alexander Turnbull	100 m breaststroke	1:06.20	30	Did not advance			
Joel Watterson	50 m freestyle	23.03	17 **R**	Did not advance			
Joel Watterson	100 m freestyle	50.66	24	Did not advance			
Joel Watterson	200 m freestyle	DNS		—N/a		Did not advance	
Joel Watterson	50 m butterfly	24.37	18 **R**	Did not advance			
Peter Allen; Magnus Kelly; Harry Robinson; Joel Watterson	4 × 100 m freestyle relay	3:24.69	7 **Q**	—N/a		3:23.89	6
Peter Allen; Magnus Kelly; Oscar Maddrell; Joel Watterson	4 × 200 m freestyle relay	7:51.01	9	—N/a		Did not advance	
Peter Allen; Charles Foster; Alexander Turnbull; Joel Watterson	4 × 100 m medley relay	3:53.74	11	—N/a		Did not advance	

Women

Athlete	Event	Heat		Semifinal		Final	
Athlete	Event	Time	Rank	Time	Rank	Time	Rank
Elizabeth Curphey	50 m backstroke	31.06	26	Did not advance			
Elizabeth Curphey	100 m backstroke	1:07.13	28	Did not advance			
Elizabeth Curphey	200 m backstroke	2:26.54	16	—N/a		Did not advance	
Lauren Dennett	100 m freestyle	1:01.44	26	Did not advance			
Lauren Dennett	200 m freestyle	2:09.54	27	—N/a		Did not advance	
Lauren Dennett	400 m freestyle	4:32.96	25	—N/a		Did not advance	
Lauren Dennett	800 m freestyle	—N/a				9:31.16	17
Ella Justice	50 m freestyle	26.38	23	Did not advance			
Ella Justice	100 m freestyle	DNS		—N/a		Did not advance	
Ella Justice	50 m backstroke	29.30	15 **Q**	29.37	16	Did not advance	
Ella Justice	100 m backstroke	1:02.83	18 **R**	1:03.47	16	Did not advance	
Laura Kinley	50 m breaststroke	32.90	15 **Q**	33.24	15	Did not advance	
Laura Kinley	100 m breaststroke	1:12.15	17 **R**	Did not advance			
Kiera Prentice	100 m freestyle	1:00.97	44	Did not advance			
Kiera Prentice	200 m freestyle	2:08.76	25	—N/a		Did not advance	
Kiera Prentice	400 m freestyle	4:32.94	24	—N/a		Did not advance	
Kiera Prentice	800 m freestyle	—N/a				9:31.21	18
Elizabeth Curphey; Lauren Dennett; Ella Justice; Kiera Prentice	4 × 100 m freestyle relay	4:01.51	9 **R**	—N/a		Did not advance	
Elizabeth Curphey; Ella Justice; Laura Kinley; Kiera Prentice	4 × 100 m medley relay	4:31.68	9 **R**	—N/a		Did not advance	

Mixed

Athlete	Event	Heats		Final	
Athlete	Event	Time	Rank	Time	Rank
Harry Robinson; Joel Watterson; Ella Justice; Kiera Prentice	4 × 100 m freestyle relay	3:39.22	8 **Q**	3:38.65	8
Harry Robinson; Joel Watterson; Ella Justice; Kiera Prentice; Peter Allen*; Laura Kinley*	4 × 100 m medley relay	4:03.40	8 **Q**	4:03.32	8

- Swimmers with a * swam in the heat only.

== Track cycling ==
Isle of Man entered two male track cyclists.

Elimination race

Athlete	Event	Final
Athlete	Event	Rank
Ben Swift	Men's elimination race	8

Points race

Athlete	Event	Qualification		Final	
Athlete	Event	Points	Rank	Points	Rank
**Matthew Bostock**	Men's point race	16	4 **Q**	83	1st place, gold medalist(s)
Ben Swift	Men's point race	14	6 **Q**	29	13

Pursuit

Athlete	Event	Qualification		Final	
Athlete	Event	Time	Rank	Opponent Results	Rank
Matthew Bostock	Men's individual pursuit	4:04.700	3 **QB**	Moriarty (AUS); **L** 4:05.820–4:04.957	4

Scratch race

Athlete	Event	Qualification	Final
Athlete	Event	Rank	Rank
Matthew Bostock	Men's scratch race	7 **Q**	4
Ben Swift	Men's scratch race	7 **Q**	DNF
