= Malta at the 2026 Commonwealth Games =

- Flag of Malta
- CG code: MLT
- CGA: Maltese Olympic Committee
- Website: nocmalta.org

in Glasgow, Scotland 23 July 2026 – 2 August 2026
- Competitors: 23 in 6 sports
- Flag bearer: Connie Rixon
- Baton bearer: Nick Mercieca
- Medals Ranked =36th: Gold 0 Silver 0 Bronze 1 Total 1

Commonwealth Games appearances (overview)
- 1958; 1962; 1966; 1970; 1974–1978; 1982; 1986; 1990; 1994; 1998; 2002; 2006; 2010; 2014; 2018; 2022; 2026; 2030

Malta competed at the 2026 Commonwealth Games in Glasgow, Scotland. This marked Malta's 15th participation at the games, after making its debut at the 1958 Commonwealth Games.

The King's Baton relay stopped in Malta in May 2026.

Malta announced its full team of 23 athletes competing in six sports on 9 July 2026. Bowls athlete Connie Rixon was the country's flagbearer during the opening ceremony. Meanwhile, para powerlifter Nick Mercieca was the baton bearer during the opening ceremony.

For the second Commonwealth Games in succession, judoka Katryna Esposito won Malta's only medal, a bronze in the women's 48 kg on 31 July.

== Competitors ==
The following is the list of number of competitors participating at the Games per sport/discipline.

| Sport | | Men | Women | Total |
|---|---|---|---|---|
| Artistic gymnastics | | 0 | 3 | 3 |
| Athletics | | 4 | 3 | 7 |
| Bowls | | 2 | 2 | 4 |
| Judo | | 1 | 1 | 2 |
| Swimming | | 1 | 1 | 2 |
| Weightlifting | Para powerlifting | 1 | 0 | 1 |
| Weightlifting | Weightlifting | 1 | 3 | 4 |
| Total | | 10 | 13 | 23 |

== Medallists ==
The following Maltese competitors won medals at the games. In the by discipline sections below, medallists' names are bolded.

| Medal | Name | Sport | Event | Date | Ref. |
|---|---|---|---|---|---|
| Bronze | Katryna Esposito | Judo | Women's 48 kg | 31 July | |

== Artistic Gymnastics ==
Malta entered three female aristic gymnasts. The women's team finished in eighth place.

Team Final & Individual Qualification

| Athlete | Event | Apparatus | | | | Total | Rank |
| Athlete | Event | VT | UB | BB | FL | Total | Rank |
|---|---|---|---|---|---|---|---|
| Philippa Busuttil | Team | 11.650 | 10.250 | 12.850 **Q** | 11.150 | 45.900 | 18 **Q** |
| Lyana Curmi Inguanez | Team | 12.000 | 8.450 | 9.100 | 10.750 | 40.300 | 32 |
| Sophie St John | Team | 12.350 | 10.850 | 11.650 | 9.700 | 44.550 | 22 **R1** |
| **Total** | Team | 36.000 | 29.550 | 33.600 | 31.600 | 130.750 | 8 |

Individual Finals

| Athlete | Event | Apparatus | | | | Total | Rank |
| Athlete | Event | VT | UB | BB | FL | Total | Rank |
|---|---|---|---|---|---|---|---|
| Philippa Busuttil | All-around | 11.600 | 9.750 | 9.650 | 10.450 | 41.450 | 18 |
| Philippa Busuttil | Balance beam | —N/a | | | | 12.800 | 6 |

== Athletics ==
Malta entered a team of seven athletes, four men and three women. Omar El Aida Chaffey was named to the team but did not compete in any event.

Key

Ranks given for track events are within the athlete's heat only.

- **Q** = Qualified for the next round
- **q** = Qualified for the next round as a fastest loser or, in field events, by position without achieving the qualifying target

Track events

| Athlete | Event | Heat | | Semifinal | | Final | |
| Athlete | Event | Result | Rank | Result | Rank | Result | Rank |
|---|---|---|---|---|---|---|---|
| Graham Pellegrini | Men's 100 metres | 10.84 | 5 | Did not advance | | | |
| Graham Pellegrini | Men's 200 metres | 21.20 | 3 | Did not advance | | | |
| Matthew Galea Soler | Men's 400 metres | 47.38 | 5 | Did not advance | | | |
| Jared Micallef | Men's 800 metres | 1:46.99 | 5 **q** | 1:48.24 | 8 | Did not advance | |
| Claire Azzopardi | Women's 100 metres | 11.87 | 3 | Did not advance | | | |
| Claire Azzopardi | Women's 200 metres | 24.16 | 4 | Did not advance | | | |
| Gina McNamara | Women's one mile | 4:48.33 | 10 | —N/a | | Did not advance | |

Field events

| Athlete | Event | Qualification | | Final | |
| Athlete | Event | Distance | Rank | Distance | Rank |
|---|---|---|---|---|---|
| Rachela Pace | Women's long jump | 6.16 | 14 | Did not advance | |

== Bowls ==
Malta entered four bowlers, two men and two women.

| Athlete | Event | Group Stage | | | | | | | Semifinal | Final / BM | |
| Athlete | Event | Opposition Score | Opposition Score | Opposition Score | Opposition Score | Opposition Score | Opposition Score | Rank | Opposition Score | Opposition Score | Rank |
|---|---|---|---|---|---|---|---|---|---|---|---|
| Shaun Parnis | Men's singles | Hamada (KEN); **W** 2–0 | Dzulkeple (MAS); **L** 0.5–1.5 | Bester (CAN); **W** 2–0 | Sonowal (IND); **W** 1.5–0.5 | Alexander (FLK); **L** 0–2 | —N/a | 2 | Did not advance | | |
| Troy Lorimer; Shaun Parnis | Men's pairs | Malaysia; **L** 1–1* | Wales; **W** 1*–1 | Jersey; **L** 1–1* | Guyana; **L** 0–2 | Niue; **W** 2–0 | —N/a | 4 | Did not advance | | |
| Connie-Leigh Rixon | Women's singles | Jim (COK); **L** 0–2 | Arthur-Almond (FLK); **W** 1*–1 | Fife (AUS); **L** 0.5–1.5 | Andrieux (JER); **W** 1*–1 | Rednall (ENG); **L** 1–1* | McKerihen (CAN); **L** 0–2 | 5 | Did not advance | | |
| Connie-Leigh Rixon; Rebecca Rixon | Women's pairs | India; **L** 1–1* | Namibia; **L** 1–1* | England; **L** 0–2 | Tonga; **W** 1*–1 | South Africa; **L** 0–2 | —N/a | 6 | Did not advance | | |

== Judo ==
Malta entered two judoka, one man and one woman.

| Athlete | Event | Round of 16 | Quarterfinals | Semifinals | Repechage | Final/BM | |
| Athlete | Event | Opposition Result | Opposition Result | Opposition Result | Opposition Result | Opposition Result | Rank |
|---|---|---|---|---|---|---|---|
| James Zahra | Men's 60 kg | Monthouel (VAN); **W** 001–100 | Did not advance | | | | |
| **Katryna Esposito** | Women's 48 kg | —N/a | Thomas (MRI); **W** 010–000s1 | Quach (CAN); **L** 001–101s1 | Bye | Ewing (SCO); **W** 101–000s1 | 3rd place, bronze medalist(s) |

== Swimming ==
Malta entered two swimmers.

| Athlete | Event | Heat | | Semifinals | | Final | |
| Athlete | Event | Time | Rank | Time | Rank | Time | Rank |
|---|---|---|---|---|---|---|---|
| Kyle Martyn Micallef | Men's 50 m freestyle | DNS | | Did not advance | | | |
| Sasha Gatt | Women's 400 m freestyle | 4:17.92 | 19 | —N/a | | Did not advance | |
| Sasha Gatt | Women's 800 m freestyle | —N/a | | | | 8:56.85 | 11 |

== Weightlifting ==
On 18 May 2026, the IWF Commonwealth Games weightlifting ranking lists were finalised. Malta qualified three female weightlifters. Following reallocations a fourth quota place, for a male athete, was also awarded. Roberta Tabone had the best finish on the weightlifting team, placing fifth in the women's 63 kg event.

| Athlete | Event | Snatch (kg) | | Clean & Jerk (kg) | | Total (kg) | Rank |
| Athlete | Event | Result | Rank | Result | Rank | Total (kg) | Rank |
|---|---|---|---|---|---|---|---|
| Rylee Borg | Men's 88 kg | 129 | 11 | 166 | 7 | 295 | 8 |
| Kim Camilleri Laganà | Women's 53 kg | 73 | 9 | 93 | 7 | 166 | 8 |
| Roberta Tabone | Women's 63 kg | 89 | 6 | 115 | 6 | 204 | 5 |
| Tenishia Thornton | Women's 69 kg | 93 | 7 | 114 | 7 | 207 | 7 |

=== Para Powerlifting ===
Malta qualified one male para powerlifter, marking the country's debut in para sport at the Commonwealth Games.

| Athlete | Event | Result | Rank |
|---|---|---|---|
| Nick Mercieca | Men's lightweight | 120 | 12 |

== See also ==
- Malta at the 2026 Winter Olympics
- Malta at the 2026 European Athletics Championships
