= Bowls at the 2026 Commonwealth Games =

- Bowls pictogram
- Venue: SEC Centre, Glasgow
- Dates: 23 July – 2 August 2026
- Competitors: 177 from 27 nations

Bowls was among the sports contested at the 2026 Commonwealth Games, held in Glasgow, Scotland. This was the twenty-second staging of lawn bowls at the Commonwealth Games having featured in every Games bar 1966, and the fourth staging within Scotland specifically.

The competition took place between 23 July and 2 August 2026, with a reduced program, and for the first time in an indoor bowls format. On 13 July 2026, the Organising committee announced an extra day of competition (scheduled for July 23rd) due the a larger number of entries than they originally planned.

== Schedule ==
The competition schedule was as follows:

G	Group stage	½	Semi-finals	B	Bronze medal match	F	Gold medal match

Date Event	Fri 24		Sat 25		Sun 26		Mon 27			Tue 28			Wed 29		Thu 30		Fri 31		Sat 1			Sun 2	
Session →	M	A	M	A	M	A	M	A		M		A	M	A	M	A	M	A	M	A		M	
Men's singles	G								½	B	F												
Men's pairs												G									½	B	F
Women's singles												G									½	B	F
Women's pairs	G								½	B	F												
Parasport
Men's pairs B6–8												G			G		G		G		½	B	F
Women's pairs B6–8												G		G		G		G		G	½	B	F
Mixed pairs B2–3	G					G		G	½	B	F												

== Participating nations ==
A total of 27 CGA's have confirmed entrants into the bowls competition. The eight nations who will each bring six para bowlers, three male and three female, to the Games were named on 9 October 2025.

- Australia (14)
- Botswana (6)
- Canada (6)
- Cook Islands (6)
- England (14)
- Falkland Islands (6)
- Fiji (6)
- Guernsey (4)
- India (6)
- Isle of Man (4)
- Jamaica (1)
- Jersey (6)
- Kenya (4)
- Malaysia (8)
- Malta (4)
- Namibia (4)
- New Zealand (14)
- Niue (5)
- Norfolk Island (6)
- Northern Ireland (4)
- Pakistan (2)
- Scotland (14)
- Singapore (6)
- South Africa (12)
- Tonga (4)
- Wales (8)
- Zambia (3)

== Medal summary ==
=== Medal table ===
* Host nation (Scotland)

Rank	Nation	Gold	Silver	Bronze	Total
1	England	3	2	1	6
2	Australia	2	0	0	2
3	Northern Ireland	1	0	2	3
4	Scotland*	1	0	0	1
5	Malaysia	0	2	2	4
6	New Zealand	0	2	0	2
7	Guernsey	0	1	0	1
8	Norfolk Island	0	0	1	1
8	Wales	0	0	1	1
Totals (9 entries)		7	7	7	21

=== Medallists ===
Event	Gold	Silver	Bronze
Men's singles	Sam Tolchard; England	Izzat Dzulkeple; Malaysia	Gary Kelly; Northern Ireland
Men's pairs	Gary Kelly; Adam McKeown; Northern Ireland	Nick Brett; Jamie Walker; England	Soufi Rusli; Amirul D Rahim; Malaysia
Women's singles	Katherine Rednall; England	Alison Merrien; Guernsey	Shae Wilson; Norfolk Island
Women's pairs	Amy Pharaoh; Sian Honnor; England	Syafiqa Haidar; Aleena Nawawi; Malaysia	Chloe Wilson; Shauna O'Neill; Northern Ireland

==== Para ====
Event	Gold	Silver	Bronze
Men's pairs B6–8	Damien Delgado; James Reynolds; Australia	Kurt Smith; Mark Noble; New Zealand	Joe Peplow; Kieran Rollings; England
Women's pairs B6–8	Louise Hoskins; Serena Bonnell; Australia	Julie O'Connell; Teri Blacbourn; New Zealand	Norazian Daud; Jariah Zakaria; Malaysia
Mixed pairs B2–3	Mary Stevenson; James Aitken; Robert Barr; Sarah-Jane Ewing; Scotland	Ron Homer; Sue Davies; Sally-Ann Lewis-Wall; Elizabeth Shipley; England	Julie Thomas; Jamie Jones; Steffan James; John Wilson; Wales
