= Boxing at the 2026 Commonwealth Games =

- Boxing pictogram
- Venue: SEC Centre
- Dates: 24 July – 1 August 2026
- Competitors: 201 from 43 nations

Boxing at the 2026 Commonwealth Games was the 23rd appearance of the Boxing at the Commonwealth Games. The boxing competition at the 2026 Commonwealth Games was held in Glasgow, Scotland, at the SEC Centre. It is one of the founding sports, having featured in every edition of the Games since the inaugural 1930 edition; the boxing competition took place within Scotland for the fourth time, with 14 medal events. Two fewer than four years earlier. However, the number of categories for men and women was equalized to seven for each gender.

The competition took place between 24 July and 1 August 2026, spread across fourteen events. India topped the medal table with 10 including a record seven golds. England also won 10 medals which was the country's highest tally since 1986. Australia won its first Commonwealth Games gold medal since 2018 when Jye Dixon claimed the men's 55 kg, followed later the same day by Emma-Sue Greentree taking the women's 75 kg gold. The only other nation to win a gold medal was Northern Ireland through Jon McConnell in the men's 70 kg. Tarona Taafaki made history by winning the first Commonwealth Games medal in any sport for Tuvalu by taking a bronze in the women's 75 kg despite losing her only bout having been given a bye into the semi-finals. Following the conclusion of the Games it was reported that four members of the Ugandan squad and one boxer from Pakistan had failed to return home and were being sought by Police Scotland.

== Schedule ==
Preliminary bouts (round of 32 and round of 16 matches) commenced on Friday 24 July, continuing until Monday 27 July. Quarter-finals was held over Tuesday 28 and Wednesday 29 July, semi-finals on Friday 31 and the gold medal bouts on Saturday 1 August.

The competition schedule was as follows:

| P | Preliminary matches | ¼ | Quarter-finals | ½ | Semi-finals | F | Final |

| Date Event | Fri 24 | | Sat 25 | | Sun 26 | | Mon 27 | | Tue 28 | | Wed 29 | | Fri 31 | | Sat 1 | |
| Session → | M | E | M | E | M | E | M | E | M | E | M | E | M | E | M | E |
|---|---|---|---|---|---|---|---|---|---|---|---|---|---|---|---|---|
| Men's 55 kg | P | | | | P | | | | ¼ | | | | ½ | | F | |
| Men's 60 kg | | | P | | | | P | | | | ¼ | | | ½ | | F |
| Men's 65 kg | P | | | | P | | | | ¼ | | | | ½ | | F | |
| Men's 70 kg | P | | | | | | P | | | | ¼ | | ½ | | F | |
| Men's 80 kg | | | P | | | | P | | | | ¼ | | ½ | | | F |
| Men's 90 kg | | | | | | P | | | ¼ | | | | ½ | | F | |
| Men's +90 kg | | | | | | | | | | | ¼ | | | ½ | | F |
| Women's 51 kg | | | | | | | P | | | | ¼ | | | ½ | | F |
| Women's 54 kg | P | | | | P | | | | ¼ | | | | ½ | | F | |
| Women's 57 kg | | | | | | P | | | | | ¼ | | ½ | | F | |
| Women's 60 kg | | P | | | | | | | ¼ | | | | | ½ | | F |
| Women's 65 kg | | | | | | | | | ¼ | | | | ½ | | F | |
| Women's 70 kg | | | | | | | | | | | ¼ | | ½ | | | F |
| Women's 75 kg | | | | | | | | | | ¼ | | | | ½ | | F |

== Venue ==
The boxing competition was held at the SEC Centre in Glasgow.

== Medal summary ==
=== Medal table ===
* Host nation (Scotland)

| Rank | CGA | Gold | Silver | Bronze | Total |
|---|---|---|---|---|---|
| 1 | India | 7 | 3 | 0 | 10 |
| 2 | England | 4 | 3 | 3 | 10 |
| 3 | Australia | 2 | 1 | 3 | 6 |
| 4 | Northern Ireland | 1 | 2 | 3 | 6 |
| 5 | Canada | 0 | 2 | 2 | 4 |
| 5 | Wales | 0 | 2 | 2 | 4 |
| 7 | Namibia | 0 | 1 | 2 | 3 |
| 8 | Scotland* | 0 | 0 | 3 | 3 |
| 9 | Lesotho | 0 | 0 | 2 | 2 |
| 9 | Zambia | 0 | 0 | 2 | 2 |
| 11 | Fiji | 0 | 0 | 1 | 1 |
| 11 | Ghana | 0 | 0 | 1 | 1 |
| 11 | Mauritius | 0 | 0 | 1 | 1 |
| 11 | Pakistan | 0 | 0 | 1 | 1 |
| 11 | Trinidad and Tobago | 0 | 0 | 1 | 1 |
| 11 | Tuvalu | 0 | 0 | 1 | 1 |
| Totals (16 entries) | | 14 | 14 | 28 | 56 |

=== Men ===
| Event | Gold | Silver | Bronze |
|---|---|---|---|
| 55 kg | Jye Dixon; Australia | Jadumani Singh; India | Amadu Mohammed; Ghana |
| 55 kg | Jye Dixon; Australia | Jadumani Singh; India | Philip Haoseb; Namibia |
| 60 kg | Sachin Siwach; India | Tryagain Ndevelo; Namibia | Owain Harris-Allan; Wales |
| 60 kg | Sachin Siwach; India | Tryagain Ndevelo; Namibia | Jude Gallagher; Northern Ireland |
| 65 kg | Patris Mughalzai; England | Jacob Cassar; Australia | Pooana Khoahli; Lesotho |
| 65 kg | Patris Mughalzai; England | Jacob Cassar; Australia | Emmanuel Katema; Zambia |
| 70 kg | Jon McConnell; Northern Ireland | Orlando Holley-Sotomi; Wales | Merven Clair; Mauritius |
| 70 kg | Jon McConnell; Northern Ireland | Orlando Holley-Sotomi; Wales | Sonny Kerr; Scotland |
| 80 kg | Ankush Panghal; India | Dimeji Shittu; England | Joshua Ofori; Canada |
| 80 kg | Ankush Panghal; India | Dimeji Shittu; England | Paul Trainor; Australia |
| 90 kg | Isaac Okoh; England | Connor Williams; Wales | Garyn McAllister; Northern Ireland |
| 90 kg | Isaac Okoh; England | Connor Williams; Wales | Robert McNulty; Scotland |
| +90 kg | Damar Thomas; England | Narender Berwal; India | Willie John McCartan; Northern Ireland |
| +90 kg | Damar Thomas; England | Narender Berwal; India | Nigel Paul; Trinidad and Tobago |

=== Women ===
| Event | Gold | Silver | Bronze |
|---|---|---|---|
| 51 kg | Sakshi Chaudhary; India | Ruby White; England | Amber-Jane Wall; Canada |
| 51 kg | Sakshi Chaudhary; India | Ruby White; England | Mischa Aeres; Namibia |
| 54 kg | Preeti Pawar; India | Scarlett Delgado; Canada | Lauren Mackie; England |
| 54 kg | Preeti Pawar; India | Scarlett Delgado; Canada | Catherine Mwape; Zambia |
| 57 kg | Jaismine Lamboria; India | Michaela Walsh; Northern Ireland | Jasmine Daunakamakama; Fiji |
| 57 kg | Jaismine Lamboria; India | Michaela Walsh; Northern Ireland | Rapelang Maselele; Lesotho |
| 60 kg | Priya Ghanghas; India | Marie Al-Ahmadieh; Canada | Fatima Zahra; Pakistan |
| 60 kg | Priya Ghanghas; India | Marie Al-Ahmadieh; Canada | Lucy Kings-Wheatley; England |
| 65 kg | Sacha Hickey; England | Kaci Rock; Northern Ireland | Caitlin Rainey; Scotland |
| 65 kg | Sacha Hickey; England | Kaci Rock; Northern Ireland | Eve Bryson; Australia |
| 70 kg | Arundhati Choudhary; India | Chantelle Reid; England | Rosie Eccles; Wales |
| 70 kg | Arundhati Choudhary; India | Chantelle Reid; England | Lekeisha Pergoliti; Australia |
| 75 kg | Emma-Sue Greentree; Australia | Lovlina Borgohain; India | Mary Kate Smith; England |
| 75 kg | Emma-Sue Greentree; Australia | Lovlina Borgohain; India | Tarona Taafaki; Tuvalu |

== Participating nations ==
There were 43 participating Commonwealth Games Associations (CGAs) in boxing with a total of 201 athletes (131 men and 70 women). The number of athletes a nation entered is in parentheses beside the name of the country.

Gabon, Guyana and Mozambique entered boxers who were withdrawn on the eve of the games due to not completing mandatory gender testing in time or had visa issues. A boxer from Nauru was also disqualified.

- Antigua and Barbuda (2)
- Australia (8)
- Bahamas (2)
- Bangladesh (3)
- Botswana (3)
- Canada (6)
- England (14)
- Fiji (5)
- Guernsey (2)
- Ghana (10)
- Gibraltar (1)
- India (14)
- Jamaica (1)
- Kenya (4)
- Kiribati (2)
- Lesotho (6)
- Malawi (3)
- Mauritius (5)
- Namibia (5)
- Nigeria (6)
- Northern Ireland (12)
- Niue (5)
- Nauru (2)
- New Zealand (6)
- Pakistan (5)
- Papua New Guinea (5)
- South Africa (4)
- Samoa (4)
- Scotland (11)
- Seychelles (3)
- Sierra Leone (1)
- Solomon Islands (4)
- Sri Lanka (6)
- Eswatini (2)
- Tanzania (3)
- Tonga (1)
- Togo (2)
- Trinidad and Tobago (3)
- Tuvalu (2)
- Uganda (6)
- Vanuatu (1)
- Wales (7)
- Zambia (4)
