= 2026 Commonwealth Games medal table =

Ranking of participants by medal total

The 2026 Commonwealth Games (officially known as the XXIII Commonwealth Games) was multi-sport event held in Glasgow, Scotland, from 23 July to 2 August 2026. A total of 215 medal events were contested across ten sports (16 disciplines).

== Rules ==
The ranking in this table is consistent with Commonwealth Sport convention in its published medal tables. By default, the table is ordered by the number of gold medals won by the athletes from an entity represented by a Commonwealth Games Association, followed by the number of silver and bronze medals respectively. If the nations are still tied, equal ranking is given and they are listed alphabetically by their three-letter country code.

Each event is awarded a gold, a silver, and a bronze medal for the top three finishers respectively. However, two bronze medals are awarded in all the boxing and judo events. In boxing, both the losing semifinalists are awarded bronze medals, while the losing semifinalists compete with the winner of the repechage contests for the bronze medals in judo.

== Notable accomplishments ==
- Rwanda won its first ever medal in the history of the Commonwealth Games when Florence Niyonkuru won the bronze medal in the women's 10,000 metres event.
- Dominica won its first ever gold medal, when Thea LaFond won the women's triple jump event.
- Boxer Tarona Taafaki won Tuvalu's first ever Commonwealth Games medal, a bronze in the women's 75 kg event.
- Judoka Marthe Gnacadja Avaro won Gabon's first ever Commonwealth Games medal, a bronze in the women's +78 kg. Gabon's Commonwealth Games debut came at this edition.
- Chad le Clos of South Africa became the most decorated individual athlete in Commonwealth Games history, winning his 21st medal.
- Emma Finucane of Wales became the first ever cyclist to win all four sprint events at the same Commonwealth Games. She won gold in the team sprint, individual sprint, 1000m time trial and keirin while setting a Commonwealth Games record in the team sprint with a 46.760s alongside teammates Lowri Thomas and Rhian Edmunds.

== Medal table ==
* Host nation (Scotland)

2026 Commonwealth Games
Rank	CGA	Gold	Silver	Bronze	Total
1	Australia	70	45	56	171
2	England	29	45	36	110
3	Canada	19	20	23	62
4	India	13	17	9	39
5	Scotland*	13	9	17	39
6	New Zealand	10	14	12	36
7	Nigeria	10	7	7	24
8	Jamaica	10	4	5	19
9	Wales	9	10	12	31
10	Malaysia	8	3	5	16
11	South Africa	7	11	10	28
12	Northern Ireland	3	4	9	16
13	Kenya	3	4	5	12
14	Cyprus	1	5	6	12
15	Mauritius	1	2	1	4
16	Cameroon	1	1	3	5
17	Jersey	1	1	0	2
17	Samoa	1	1	0	2
17	Sri Lanka	1	1	0	2
20	Bahamas	1	0	1	2
20	Fiji	1	0	1	2
20	Isle of Man	1	0	1	2
23	British Virgin Islands	1	0	0	1
23	Dominica	1	0	0	1
23	Grenada	1	0	0	1
26	Trinidad and Tobago	0	3	4	7
27	Uganda	0	2	1	3
28	Singapore	0	2	0	2
29	Namibia	0	1	2	3
30	Ghana	0	1	1	2
31	Barbados	0	1	0	1
31	Guernsey	0	1	0	1
33	Lesotho	0	0	2	2
33	Nauru	0	0	2	2
33	Zambia	0	0	2	2
36	Bermuda	0	0	1	1
36	Gabon	0	0	1	1
36	Malta	0	0	1	1
36	Norfolk Island	0	0	1	1
36	Pakistan	0	0	1	1
36	Papua New Guinea	0	0	1	1
36	Rwanda	0	0	1	1
36	The Gambia	0	0	1	1
36	Tonga	0	0	1	1
36	Tuvalu	0	0	1	1
Totals (45 entries)		216	215	243	674

Note: In the swimming events, there were three ties for the medal places. Two gold medals were awarded in the men's 50 metre butterfly, two silver medals in the men's 200 metre freestyle, and two bronze medals in the women's 50 metre breaststroke.

== See also ==
- List of 2026 Commonwealth Games medal winners
- All-time Commonwealth Games medal table
