= Christine Jones (bowls) =

Norfolk Islander lawn bowler

Personal information
- Nationality: Norfolk Islander
- Born: 9 March 1963 (age 63) Marton, New Zealand
Medal record
Representing Norfolk Island
Asia Pacific Bowls Championships
Bronze medal – third place	2015 Christchurch	pairs

Christine Jones (born 1963 in New Zealand) is a Norfolk Islander lawn bowls international.

== Bowls career ==
=== World Championship ===
In 2020 she was selected for the 2020 World Outdoor Bowls Championship in Australia.

=== Commonwealth Games ===
She competed for Norfolk Island at the 2018 Commonwealth Games in the Gold Coast, Queensland.

=== Asia Pacific ===
Jones won a pairs bronze medal at the 2015 Asia Pacific Bowls Championships in Christchurch, New Zealand.
