= Milika Nathan =

Tongan lawn bowler

Personal information
- Nationality: Tongan
- Born: c.1990

Sport
- Club: Birkenhead BC

Achievements and titles
- Highest world ranking: 20 (November 2025)
Medal record
Representing (Tonga)
World Singles Champion of Champions
Gold medal – first place	2024 Auckland	singles

Milika Nathan (born c.1990) is a Tongan international lawn bowler, who became a world champion in 2024 after winning the World Singles Champion of Champions. She reached a career high ranking of world number 25 in June 2025.

== Bowls career ==
In 2024, Nathan surprised the bowls world by winning the World Singles Champion of Champions, which was held in Auckland, New Zealand. The Tongan who had qualified for the event by virtue of winning her national title claimed the gold medal by beating the established nations. After winning six of her seven pool matches, she defeated Teokotai Jim in the quarter-final, Stef Branfield of England in the semi-final and Anne Nunes of the United States in the final.

Nathan had previously also won her national indoor title, which qualified her to compete in the 2023 World Bowls Indoor Championships.

== Personal life ==
At the time of her bowls success, Nathan was a teacher by trade and worked at Northcote Intermediate School. She is In room 23
