= Scotland at the 2026 Commonwealth Games =

- Flag of Scotland
- CG code: SCO
- CGA: Commonwealth Games Scotland
- Website: www.teamscotland.scot

in Glasgow, Scotland 23 July 2026 – 2 August 2026
- Flag bearer (opening): Alex Marshall
- Baton bearer: Sarah Adlington
- Flag bearer (closing): Reuben Ward
- Medals Ranked 5th: Gold 13 Silver 9 Bronze 17 Total 39

Commonwealth Games appearances (overview)
- 1930; 1934; 1938; 1950; 1954; 1958; 1962; 1966; 1970; 1974; 1978; 1982; 1986; 1990; 1994; 1998; 2002; 2006; 2010; 2014; 2018; 2022; 2026; 2030

Scotland competed at the 2026 Commonwealth Games in Glasgow between 23 July and 2 August 2026 as host. It was Scotland's fourth appearance as host, and twenty-third in total. Scotland has appeared in every edition of the Games.

Bowler Alex Marshall was the country's opening ceremony flagbearer and judoka Sarah Adlington was the baton bearer. Gold medalist gymnast Reuben Ward served as the country's closing ceremony flagbearer.

== Selection as host ==
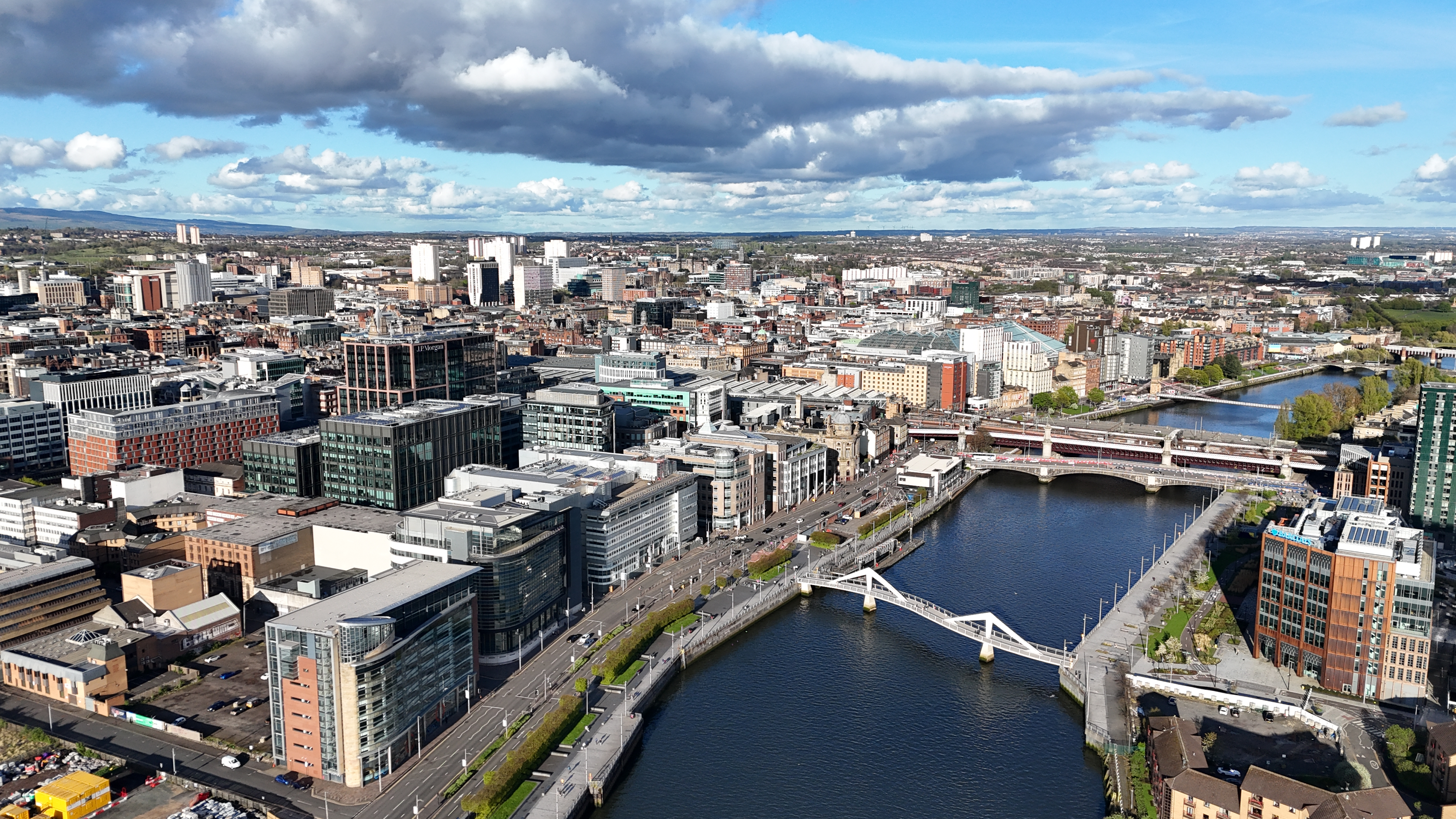
Glasgow was considered as the "last possibility" to host the 2026 Games after Victoria pulled out.

On 11 April 2024, it was announced that Glasgow was considered as a "last possibility" to host the 2026 Games in the event that no other host was forthcoming. It was reported that the Games would be on a smaller scale and could reuse venues from the 2014 Commonwealth Games. Accommodation for the athletes would comprise hotels, and possibly the student residences of Glasgow Caledonian University and University of Glasgow. Furthermore, the cost of the Games would be covered fully by the Commonwealth Games Federation and their corporate sponsors. Discussions were ongoing between Commonwealth Games Scotland, the Scottish Government and EventScotland: a confirmed bid was expected by the end of the month, but the bid documents were in fact not submitted at that time. On 25 July 2024, the BBC reported that a decision would be made in August.

On 11 August 2024, it was speculated that an agreement had been reached for Glasgow to take over the hosting rights of the Games. A statement from the Commonwealth Games Council for Scotland issued on 30 August 2024, suggested a compact and low scale Games with 10 sports across four venues including the Scotstoun Stadium and the Tollcross International Swimming Centre.

On 17 September 2024, it was announced that the Scottish Government had agreed to host the Games with compensation from Victoria.

2026 Commonwealth Games bidding results
| City / region | Nation | Votes |
|---|---|---|
| Glasgow | Scotland | Unanimous |

== Medalists ==
| Medal | Name | Sport | Event | Date |
|---|---|---|---|---|
| Gold | Duncan Scott | Swimming | Men's 200 m individual medley | 24 July |
| Gold | Faye Rogers | Swimming | Women's 200 m individual medley SM10 | 24 July |
| Gold | Reuben Ward | Artistic gymnastics | Men's individual all-around | 26 July |
| Gold | Angharad Evans | Swimming | Women's 100 m breaststroke | 26 July |
| Gold | Ben Sandilands | Athletics | Men's 1500 m T20 | 27 July |
| Gold | Mary Stevenson; James Aitken; Robert Barr; Sarah-Jane Ewing | Bowls | Mixed pairs B2–3 | 28 July |
| Gold | Stephen Clegg | Swimming | Men's 50 m freestyle S13 | 28 July |
| Gold | Angharad Evans | Swimming | Women's 200 m breaststroke | 29 July |
| Gold | Neil Fachie; Aaron Pope (pilot) | Track cycling | Men's tandem 1 km time trial B | 30 July |
| Gold | Melanie Woods | Athletics | Women's 1500 m T54 | 31 July |
| Silver | Stephen Clegg | Swimming | Men's 100 m freestyle S13 | 24 July |
| Silver | Katie Shanahan | Swimming | Women's 200 m backstroke | 24 July |
| Silver | Reuben Ward | Artistic gymnastics | Men's pommel horse | 27 July |
| Silver | Keanna Macinnes | Swimming | Women's 100 m butterfly | 27 July |
| Silver | Kayli English; Robyn Love; Jodie Waite; Lea Smith | 3x3 basketball | Women's wheelchair tournament | 29 July |
| Silver | Keanna Macinnes | Swimming | Women's 200 m butterfly | 29 July |
| Silver | Katie Shanahan; Angharad Evans; Anna Morgan; Holly McGill; Keanna Macinnes; Evie Davis; Ciara Schlosshan; Emma Wood | Swimming | Women's 4x100 m medley relay | 29 July |
| Silver | Mark Stewart | Track cycling | Men's elimination race | 31 July |
| Bronze | Cameron Lynn | Artistic gymnastics | Men's pommel horse | 27 July |
| Bronze | Steven Bryce | Athletics | Men's 1500 m T20 | 27 July |
| Bronze | Angus Doig | Weightlifting | Men's 88 kg | 28 July |
| Bronze | Matthew Ward; Angharad Evans; Duncan Scott; Dean Fern; Keanna Macinnes; Lucy Grieve; Joshua Mitchell; Emma Wood | Swimming | Mixed 4x100 m medley relay | 28 July |
| Bronze | Kyle Jimenez; Fraser Malcolm; Owen McCormack; Skyler White | 3x3 basketball | Men's tournament | 29 July |
| Bronze | Stephen Mackenzie | Athletics | Men's long jump | 29 July |
| Bronze | Toni Shaw | Swimming | Women's 100 m freestyle S9 | 29 July |
| Bronze | Lauren Bell; Iona Moir; Madeleine Silcock | Track cycling | Women's team sprint | 30 July |
| Bronze | Megan Keith | Athletics | Women's 5000 metres | 30 July |
| Bronze | Caitlin Rainey | Boxing | Women's 65 kg | 31 July |
| Bronze | Summer Shaw | Judo | Women's 48 kg | 31 July |
| Bronze | Sonny Kerr | Boxing | Men's 70 kg | 31 July |
| Bronze | Erin Boothman | Track cycling | Women's individual pursuit | 31 July |
| Bronze | Robert McNulty | Boxing | Men's 90 kg | 31 July |
| Bronze | Fin Graham | Track cycling | Men's 1 km time trial C1-3 | 31 July |
| Bronze | Erin Boothman | Track cycling | Women's scratch race | 31 July |

== Competitors ==
The following is the list of number of competitors participating at the Games per sport/discipline.

| Sport | Men | Women | Total |
|---|---|---|---|
| Athletics | 19 | 20 | 39 |
| 3x3 basketball | 8 | 8 | 16 |
| Bowls | 6 | 6 | 12 |
| Boxing | 6 | 5 | 11 |
| Cycling | 12 | 7 | 19 |
| Gymnastics | 5 | 4 | 9 |
| Judo | 7 | 6 | 13 |
| Netball | | 12 | 12 |
| Para powerlifting | 1 | 1 | 2 |
| Swimming | 17 | 15 | 32 |
| Weightlifting | 5 | 4 | 9 |
| Total | 86 | 88 | 174 |

== Athletics ==
Team Scotland preselected three athletes; Jake Wightman, Neil Gourley and Megan Keith The remainder of the 39-member team, including para-athletes, was announced on 26 June 2026.

Key

Ranks given for track events are within the athlete's heat only.

- Q = Qualified for the next round
- q = Qualified for the next round as a fastest loser or, in field events, by position without achieving the qualifying target

Men
Track events

| Athlete | Event | Heat | | Semifinal | | Final | |
| Athlete | Event | Result | Rank | Result | Rank | Result | Rank |
|---|---|---|---|---|---|---|---|
| Brodie Young | Men's 400 metres | 46.57 | 3 | Did not advance | | | |
| Jamie Phillips | Men's 800 metres | 1:48.47 | 4 | Did not advance | | | |
| Neil Gourley | Mile run | 4:01.45 | 9 | —N/a | | Did not advance | |
| Josh Kerr | Mile run | 3:58.57 | 1 Q | —N/a | | 3:54.12 | 1st place, gold medalist(s) |
| Jake Wightman | Mile run | 3:54.05 | 2 Q | —N/a | | 3:56.36 | 6 |
| Andrew Butchart | Men's 5000 metres | —N/a | | | | 13:55.31 | 18 |
| Andrew Butchart | Men's 10,000 metres | —N/a | | | | 28:16.75 | 13 |

Field events

| Athlete | Event | Qualification | | Final | |
| Athlete | Event | Distance | Rank | Distance | Rank |
|---|---|---|---|---|---|
| Stephen Mackenzie | Men's long jump | 7.75 | 8 q | 8.08 | 3rd place, bronze medalist(s) |
| Jax Thoirs | Men's pole vault | | | | |
| Christopher Bennett | Men's hammer throw | | | | |
| Nick Percy | Men's discus throw | | | | |

Combined events – Decathlon

| Athlete | Event | 100 m | LJ | SP | HJ | 400 m | 110H | DT | PV | JT | 1500 m | Final | Rank |
|---|---|---|---|---|---|---|---|---|---|---|---|---|---|
| Callum Newby | Result | | | | | | | | | | | | |
| Callum Newby | Points | | | | | | | | | | | | |
| Joel McFarlane | Result | | | | | | | | | | | | |
| Joel McFarlane | Points | | | | | | | | | | | | |

Women
Track events

| Athlete | Event | Heat | | Semifinal | | Final | |
| Athlete | Event | Result | Rank | Result | Rank | Result | Rank |
|---|---|---|---|---|---|---|---|
| Alyson Bell | Women's 200 metres | | | | | | |
| Nicole Yeargin | Women's 400 metres | | | | | | |
| Mena Scatchard | Women's 800 metres | | | | | | |
| Erin Wallace | Women's 800 metres | | | | | | |
| Erin Wallace | Women's mile | | | | | | |
| Jemma Reekie | Women's 800 metres | | | | | | |
| Jemma Reekie | Women's mile | | | | | | |
| Sarah Calvert | Women's mile | | | | | | |
| Eloise Walker | Women's 5000 metres | | | | | | |
| Laura Muir | Women's 5000 metres | | | | | | |
| Megan Keith | Women's 5000 metres | | | | | | |
| Megan Keith | Women's 10,000 metres | | | | | | |
| Eilish McColgan | Women's 10,000 metres | | | | | | |
| Sarah Tait | Women's 3000 metres s'chase | | | | | | |
| Georgina Adam; Alyson Bell; Lucy Fraser; Alisha Rees; Kaya Slater | Women's 4 x 100 metres relay | | | | | | |

Field events

| Athlete | Event | Qualification | | Final | |
| Athlete | Event | Distance | Rank | Distance | Rank |
|---|---|---|---|---|---|
| Angela McAuslan-Kelly | Women's hammer throw | 60.59 | 11 q | | |

Combined events – Heptathlon

| Athlete | Event | 100H | HJ | SP | 200 m | LJ | JT | 800 m | Final | Rank |
|---|---|---|---|---|---|---|---|---|---|---|
| Allie Routledge | | | | | | | | | | |

Mixed event

| Athlete | Event | Heat | | Final | |
| Athlete | Event | Result | Rank | Result | Rank |
|---|---|---|---|---|---|
| Bradley Francis; Rebecca Grieve; Nicole Yeargin; Brodie Young | Mixed 4 x 400 metres relay | | | | |

Para events
Male track

| Athlete | Event | Heat | | Final | |
| Athlete | Event | Result | Rank | Result | Rank |
|---|---|---|---|---|---|
| Alexander Thomson | Men's 100 metres (T38) | | | | |
| Owen Miller | Men's 1500 metres (T20) | | | | |
| Steven Bryce | Men's 1500 metres (T20) | | | | |
| Ben Sandilands | Men's 1500 metres (T20) | | | | |
| Sean Framet | Men's 1500 metres (T54) | | | | |

Female track

| Athlete | Event | Heat | | Final | |
| Athlete | Event | Result | Rank | Result | Rank |
|---|---|---|---|---|---|
| Melanie Woods | Women's 400 metres (T54) | | | | |
| Melanie Woods | Women's 1500 metres (T54) | | | | |
| Joanna Robertson | Women's 1500 metres (T54) | | | | |

Field events

| Athlete | Event | Qualification | | Final | |
| Athlete | Event | Distance | Rank | Distance | Rank |
|---|---|---|---|---|---|
| Steven Stone | Men's long jump (T20) | | | | |

== Basketball 3x3 ==
Scotland's men's and women's standing and wheelchair basketball teams all received entry to their respective competitions as hosts. All four squads were announced on 18 June 2026. The pools and fixture lists were released on 2 July 2026.

Summary

| Team | Event | Group stage | | | | | | Quarterfinal | Semifinal | Final / BM / CM | |
| Team | Event | Opposition Score | Opposition Score | Opposition Score | Opposition Score | Opposition Score | Rank | Opposition Score | Opposition Score | Opposition Score | Rank |
|---|---|---|---|---|---|---|---|---|---|---|---|
| Scotland; Kyle Jimenez; Fraser Malcolm; Owen McCormack; Skyler White | Men's | Guyana; W 21—14 | Cayman Islands; W 22—13 | Australia; L 14—21 | Nigeria; W 21—16 | New Zealand; L 13—21 | 3 QF | Malaysia; W 21—16 | Australia; L 14—21 | New Zealand; W 18—15 | 3rd place, bronze medalist(s) |
| Scotland; Claire Paxton; Hannah Robb; Kirsty Brown; Ella Doherty | Women's | Tonga; L 10—12 | England; L 9—14 | Singapore; W 21—15 | New Zealand; L 12—21 | Papua New Guinea; W 21—5 | 4 | Did not advance | | | 7 |
| Scotland; Tyler Baines; Ross McConnell; Finlay Erskine; Shayne Humphries | Men's wheelchair | {South Africa; W 15—9 | Malaysia; W 16—8 | Wales; W 21—10 | — | | 1 SF | — | Australia; L 12—19 | Canada; L 9—19 | 4 |
| Scotland; Kayli English; Robyn Love; Lea Smith; Jodie Waite | Women's wheelchair | Nigeria; W 16—1 | India; W 21—4 | Wales; W 16—2 | — | | 1 SF | — | Australia; W 15—12 | England; L 10—18 | 2nd place, silver medalist(s) |

=== Men's tournament ===
Group A

| Pos | Team | Pld | W | L | PF | PA | PD | Qualification |
|---|---|---|---|---|---|---|---|---|
| 1 | Australia | 5 | 5 | 0 | 105 | 60 | +45 | Direct to semi-finals |
| 2 | New Zealand | 5 | 4 | 1 | 99 | 56 | +43 | Quarter-finals |
| 3 | Scotland (H) | 5 | 3 | 2 | 90 | 85 | +5 | Quarter-finals |
| 4 | Nigeria | 5 | 2 | 3 | 82 | 99 | −17 | |
| 5 | Guyana | 5 | 1 | 4 | 68 | 100 | −32 | |
| 6 | Cayman Islands | 5 | 0 | 5 | 61 | 105 | −44 | |

Source: Glasgow 2026
Rules for classification: 1) Wins; 2) Head-to-head record; 3) Points scored.
(H) Hosts

24 July 2026
12:30

Report

| Scotland | 21–14 | Guyana |
| Pts: White 8 | | Pts: Hinckson 6 |

SEC, Glasgow

24 July 2026
15:45

Report

| Scotland | 22–13 | Cayman Islands |
| Pts: White 15 | | Pts: Lansdell 7 |

SEC, Glasgow

24 July 2026
20:40

Report

| Scotland | 14–21 | Australia |
| Pts: White 7 | | Pts: McDaniel 10 |

SEC, Glasgow

26 July 2026
13:10

Report

| Scotland | 21–16 | Nigeria |
| Pts: McCormack 8 | | Pts: Esonwune 7 |

SEC, Glasgow

26 July 2026
17:00

Report

| New Zealand | 21–13 | Scotland |
| Pts: Book 9 | | Pts: Jimenez 8 |

SEC, Glasgow

Play-ins

28 July 2026
18:00

Report

| Malaysia | 16–21 | Scotland |
| Pts: Ting 9 | | Pts: Jimenez 7 |

SEC, Glasgow

Semi-final

29 July 2026
11:30

Report

| Australia | 21–14 | Scotland |
| Pts: McDaniel 10 | | Pts: Jimenez 8 |

SEC, Glasgow

Bronze medal match

29 July 2026
16:30

Report

| New Zealand | 16–18 | Scotland |
| Pts: Book 5 | | Pts: Jimenez 9 |

SEC, Glasgow

=== Women's tournament ===
Group play

| Pos | Team | Pld | W | L | PF | PA | PD | Qualification |
|---|---|---|---|---|---|---|---|---|
| 1 | New Zealand | 5 | 5 | 0 | 105 | 54 | +51 | Direct to semi-finals |
| 2 | England | 5 | 4 | 1 | 89 | 45 | +44 | Quarter-finals |
| 3 | Tonga | 5 | 3 | 2 | 50 | 72 | −22 | Quarter-finals |
| 4 | Scotland (H) | 5 | 2 | 3 | 73 | 67 | +6 | |
| 5 | Singapore | 5 | 1 | 4 | 69 | 85 | −16 | |
| 6 | Papua New Guinea | 5 | 0 | 5 | 33 | 96 | −63 | |

Source: Glasgow 2026
Rules for classification: 1) Wins; 2) Head-to-head record; 3) Points scored.
(H) Hosts

25 July 2026
10:00

Report

| Scotland | 10–12 | Tonga |
| Pts: Brown 7 | | Pts: L Finau, M Finau 5 |

SEC, Glasgow

25 July 2026
17:00

Report

| England | 14–9 | Scotland |
| Pts: Green 7 | | Pts: Robb, Doherty 3 |

SEC, Glasgow

25 July 2026
19:25

Report

| Singapore | 15–21 | Scotland |
| Pts: Han 8 | | Pts: Brown 8 |

SEC, Glasgow

27 July 2026
13:10

Report

| New Zealand | 21–12 | Scotland |
| Pts: Fotu 8 | | Pts: Brown 7 |

SEC, Glasgow

27 July 2026
17:00

Report

| Scotland | 21–5 | Papua New Guinea |
| Pts: Doherty 8 | | Pts: Dobunaba 4 |

SEC, Glasgow

=== Men's wheelchair tournament ===
Group play

| Pos | Team | Pld | W | L | PF | PA | PD | Qualification |
|---|---|---|---|---|---|---|---|---|
| 1 | Scotland | 3 | 3 | 0 | 54 | 25 | +29 | Semi-finals |
| 2 | South Africa | 3 | 2 | 1 | 38 | 37 | +1 | Play-ins |
| 3 | Wales | 3 | 1 | 2 | 36 | 50 | −14 | Play-ins |
| 4 | Malaysia | 3 | 0 | 3 | 29 | 45 | −16 | |

Source: Glasgow 2026
Rules for classification: 1) Wins; 2) Head-to-head record; 3) Points scored.

25 July 2026
11:40

Report

| Scotland | 15–9 | South Africa |
| Pts: Erskine 11 | | Pts: Yalezo 4 |

SEC Centre, Glasgow

26 July 2026
17:00

Report

| Malaysia | 6–18 | Scotland |
| Pts: Zakaria 3 | | Pts: Erskine 12 |

SEC Centre, Glasgow

27 July 2026
19:55

Report

| Wales | 10–21 | Scotland |
| Pts: May 7 | | Pts: Erskine 13 |

SEC Centre, Glasgow

Semi-final

29 July 2026
12:30

Report

| Scotland | 12–19 | Australia |
| Pts: Erskine 9 | | Pts: O'Neill-Thorne 8 |

SEC Centre, Glasgow

Bronze medal match

29 July 2026
17:30

Report

| Scotland | 9–19 | Canada |
| Pts: Erskine 8 | | Pts: De'Eath 9 |

SEC Centre, Glasgow

=== Women's wheelchair tournament ===
Group play

| Pos | Team | Pld | W | L | PF | PA | PD | Qualification |
|---|---|---|---|---|---|---|---|---|
| 1 | Scotland | 3 | 3 | 0 | 53 | 7 | +46 | Semi-finals |
| 2 | Wales | 3 | 2 | 1 | 35 | 18 | +17 | Quarter-finals |
| 3 | Nigeria | 3 | 1 | 2 | 9 | 39 | −30 | Quarter-finals |
| 4 | India | 3 | 0 | 3 | 11 | 44 | −33 | |

Source: Glasgow 2026
Rules for classification: 1) Wins; 2) Head-to-head record; 3) Points scored.

25 July 2026
16:10

Report

| Scotland | 16–1 | Nigeria |
| Pts: Love 7 | | Pts: Adefala 1 |

SEC Centre, Glasgow

26 July 2026
18:15

Report

| India | 4–21 | Scotland |
| Pts: Gupta 2 | | Pts: Smith 11 |

SEC Centre, Glasgow

27 July 2026
17:50

Report

| Wales | 2–16 | Scotland |
| Pts: Lander 2 | | Pts: Smith 11 |

SEC Centre, Glasgow

Semi-final

29 July 2026
15:00

Report

| Scotland | 15–12 | Australia |
| Pts: Love 6 | | Pts: Munro-Cook 6 |

SEC Centre, Glasgow

Gold medal match

29 July 2026
19:00

Report

| Scotland | 10–18 | England |
| Pts: Smith 6 | | Pts: Atkin 7 |

SEC Centre, Glasgow

== Boxing ==
Scotland have been granted ten quota places across the fourteen weight divisions at the boxing tournament at the 2026 Commonwealth Games. A supplementary eleventh quota was subsequently granted.

Men

| Athlete | Event | Round of 32 | Round of 16 | Quarterfinals | Semifinals | Final | |
| Athlete | Event | Opposition Result | Opposition Result | Opposition Result | Opposition Result | Opposition Result | Rank |
|---|---|---|---|---|---|---|---|
| Aaron Cullen | 55 kg | Mandengbam (IND); L 0-5 | Did not advance | | | | |
| Nick Devlin | 60 kg | O'Sullivan (NZL); W 5-0 | Ankrah (GHA) - | | | | |
| Leo Church | 65 kg | Tebouwa (NRU); W 5-0 | Katema (ZAM); L 0-4 | Did not advance | | | |
| Sonny Kerr | 70 kg | bye | Maina (KEN) - | | | | |
| Alan Perrie | 80 kg | Trainor (AUS); L RSC | Did not advance | | | | |
| Robert McNulty | 90 kg | — | bye | Pokhariya (IND); W 5-0 | Okoh (ENG); L 0-5 | Did not advance | |

Women

| Athlete | Event | Round of 16 | Quarterfinals | Semifinals | Final | |
| Athlete | Event | Opposition Result | Opposition Result | Opposition Result | Opposition Result | Rank |
|---|---|---|---|---|---|---|
| Brooke Neely | 51 kg | Ranasinghe (SRI); L 2-3 | Did not advance | | | |
| Stephanie Kernachan | 54 kg | bye | Delgado (CAN); L 0-5 | Did not advance | | |
| Lara Brown | 57 kg | bye | Walsh (NIR) - | | | |
| Niamh Mitchell | 60 kg | bye | Priya (IND); L 1-4 | Did not advance | | |
| Caitlin Rainey | 65 kg | — | Loga (PNG) - | | | |

== Bowls ==
Commonwealth Games Scotland announced their bowls and para bowls squad on 21 April 2026.

Men

| Athlete | Event | Group Stage | | | | | | Semifinal | Final / BM | |
| Athlete | Event | Opposition Score | Opposition Score | Opposition Score | Opposition Score | Opposition Score | Rank | Opposition Score | Opposition Score | Rank |
|---|---|---|---|---|---|---|---|---|---|---|
| Jason Banks | Singles | Wales | Pakistan | England | Simpson (JAM); W 2-0 | Fiji | | | | |
| Alex Marshall; Paul Foster | Pairs | Kenya | Norfolk Island | Isle of Man | South Africa | Canada | | | | |

Women

| Athlete | Event | Group Stage | | | | | | Semifinal | Final / BM | |
| Athlete | Event | Opposition Score | Opposition Score | Opposition Score | Opposition Score | Opposition Score | Rank | Opposition Score | Opposition Score | Rank |
|---|---|---|---|---|---|---|---|---|---|---|
| Sophie McGrouther | Singles | Fiji | Kenya | Namibia | Tonga | Norfolk Island | | | | |
| Beth Riva; Caroline Brown | Pairs | Jersey | Norfolk Island | Falkland Islands | Malaysia | Cook Islands | | | | |

Para bowls

| Athlete | Event | Group Stage | | | | | | Semifinal | Final / BM | |
| Athlete | Event | Opposition Score | Opposition Score | Opposition Score | Opposition Score | Opposition Score | Rank | Opposition Score | Opposition Score | Rank |
|---|---|---|---|---|---|---|---|---|---|---|
| Garry Brown; Stuart Sloan | Men's pair B6-8 | | | | | | | | | |
| Mary Wilson; Pauline Wilson | Women's pair B6-8 | | | | | | | | | |
| Mary Stevenson (Sarah Jane Ewing – dir.); Robert Barr (Jim Aitken – dir.) | Mixed pair B2-3 | | | | | | | | | |

== Cycling ==
Team Scotland announced its first cyclists for the velodrome on 4 December 2025, selecting Katie Archibald, Mark Stewart and Lauren Bell. Archibald, however, subsequently announced her retirement from the sport before the Games. On 24 February 2026, Team Scotland announced its first para cyclists, Neil Fachie and Fin Graham. Team Scotland may ultimately nominate up to four riders per able-bodied event and up to two per para-cycling event. The full team was announced on 4 June 2016. On 24 June, the addition of sprinters Pete Mitchell and Niall Monks completed the track team for Scotland.

=== Track ===
Sprint

| Athlete | Event | Qualification | | Round 1 | Quarterfinals | Semifinals | Final | |
| Athlete | Event | Time | Rank | Opposition Time | Opposition Time | Opposition Time | Opposition Time | Rank |
|---|---|---|---|---|---|---|---|---|
| Lyall Craig | Men's sprint | | | | | | | |
| tbc | Men's sprint | | | | | | | |
| Lyall Craig; Pete Mitchell; Niall Monks | Men's team sprint | | | | | | | |
| Lauren Bell | Women's sprint | | | | | | | |
| tbc | Women's sprint | | | | | | | |
| Lauren Bell; Ellie Stone; Iona Moir; Maddie Sillock | Women's team sprint | | | | | | | |
| Neil Fachie; Aaron Pope – pilot | Men's tandem sprint B | | | | | | | |

Keirin

| Athlete | Event | 1st Round | Repechage | Semifinals | Final |
| Athlete | Event | Rank | Rank | Rank | Rank |
|---|---|---|---|---|---|
| Lyall Craig | Men's keirin | | | | |
| tbc | Men's keirin | | | | |
| Lauren Bell | Women's keirin | | | | |
| Maddie Sillock | Women's keirin | | | | |

Time trial

| Athlete | Event | Time | Rank |
|---|---|---|---|
| Lyall Craig | Men's time trial | | |
| tbc | Men's time trial | | |
| Lauren Bell | Women's time trial | | |
| tbc | Women's time trial | | |
| Neil Fachie; Aaron Pope – pilot | Men's tandem time trial B | | |
| Fin Graham | Men's 1 km time trial C1-3 | | |

Pursuit

| Athlete | Event | Qualification | | Final | |
| Athlete | Event | Time | Rank | Opponent Results | Rank |
|---|---|---|---|---|---|
| Mark Stewart | Men's individual pursuit | | | | |
| Michael Gill | Men's individual pursuit | | | | |
| Michael Gill; Mark Stewart; Elliott Rowe; Logan MacLean; Lewis Askey; Timothy Shoreman | Men's team pursuit | | | | |
| Erin Boothman | Women's individual pursuit | | | | |
| Neah Evans | Women's individual pursuit | | | | |
| Neah Evans; Erin Boothman; Kate Richardson tbc | Women's team pursuit | | | | |
| Fin Graham | Men's individual pursuit C1-3 | | | | |

Points race

| Athlete | Event | Final | |
| Athlete | Event | Points | Rank |
|---|---|---|---|
| Mark Stewart | Men's points race | | |
| tbc | Men's points race | | |
| tbc | Women's points race | | |
| tbc | Women's points race | | |

Scratch race

| Athlete | Event | Qualification | Final |
|---|---|---|---|
| Mark Stewart | Men's scratch race | | |
| tbc | Women's scratch race | | |

Elimination race

| Athlete | Event | Time | Rank |
|---|---|---|---|
| Mark Stewart | Men's elimination | | |
| tbc | Women's elimination | | |

== Artistic gymnastics ==
Team Scotland announced its 9 member gymnastics squad for the games on 27 May 2026.

Men
Team Final & Individual Qualification

| Athlete | Event | Apparatus | | | | | | Total | Rank |
| Athlete | Event | F | PH | R | V | PB | HB | Total | Rank |
|---|---|---|---|---|---|---|---|---|---|
| Hamish Carter | Team | 12.800 | 12.650 | ~~11.700~~ | 13.350 | 13.100 | 12.900 | 76.500 | 10 |
| Pavel Karnejenko | Team | | | 12.400 | | ~~12.100~~ | | | |
| Cameron Lynn | Team | 12.450 | 13.000 Q | 11.800 | 13.650 | 13.050 | 13.500 Q | 77.450 | 9 Q |
| Connor Sullivan | Team | ~~12.350~~ | ~~10.700~~ | | ~~12.400~~ | | ~~12.400~~ | | |
| Reuben Ward | Team | 13.150 Q | 14.550 Q | 12.300 | 13.000 | 13.500 Q | 13.150 | 79.650 | 3 Q |
| Total | Team | 38.400 | 40.200 | 36.500 | 40.000 | 39.650 | 39.550 | 234.300 | 4 |

Individual finals

| Athlete | Event | Apparatus | | | | | | Total | Rank |
| Athlete | Event | F | PH | R | V | PB | HB | Total | Rank |
|---|---|---|---|---|---|---|---|---|---|
| Cameron Lynn | All-around | 12.700 | 11.800 | 12.650 | 13.700 | 11.600 | 12.900 | 75.350 | 10 |
| Reuben Ward | All-around | 12.800 | 14.100 | 12.250 | 14.050 | 13.750 | 12.700 | 79.650 | 1st place, gold medalist(s) |

| Athlete | Apparatus | Score | Rank |
|---|---|---|---|
| Reuben Ward | Floor | 14.966 | 6 |
| Reuben Ward | Pommel horse | 11.666 | 2nd place, silver medalist(s) |
| Cameron Lynn | Pommel horse | 13.833 | 3rd place, bronze medalist(s) |
| Reuben Ward | Parallel bars | 13.166 | 5 |
| Cameron Lynn | Horizontal bar | 13.133 | 5 |

Women
Team Final & Individual Qualification

| Athlete | Event | Apparatus | | | | Total | Rank |
| Athlete | Event | V | UB | BB | F | Total | Rank |
|---|---|---|---|---|---|---|---|
| Ellee Cheetham | Team | 12.700 | 11.500 | 11.250 | 11.250 | 46.700 | 19 Q |
| Ava MacFarlane | Team | ~~10.300~~ | 11.550 | 11.100 | 11.500 | 44.450 | 24 |
| Crystelle Lake | Team | 13.050 | 11.700 | 11.250 | 12.100 | 48.100 | 13 Q |
| Lottie Smith | Team | 11.900 | ~~11.150~~ | ~~10.900~~ | ~~10.600~~ | 44.550 | 23 |
| Total | Team | 37.650 | 34.750 | 33.600 | 34.850 | 140.850 | 6 |

Individual finals

| Athlete | Event | Apparatus | | | | Total | Rank |
| Athlete | Event | V | UB | BB | F | Total | Rank |
|---|---|---|---|---|---|---|---|
| Crystelle Lake | All-around | 13.100 | 13.250 | 12.350 | 10.700 | 49.400 | 9 |
| Ellee Cheetham | All-around | 13.050 | 11.700 | 10.700 | 10.550 | 46.000 | 17 |

== Judo ==
Team Scotland announced a squad of 13 judoka, headlined by double Games champion Sarah Adlington, on 15 June 2026.

Men

| Athlete | Event | Round of 32 | Round of 16 | Quarterfinals | Semifinals | Repechage | Final/BM | |
| Athlete | Event | Opposition Result | Opposition Result | Opposition Result | Opposition Result | Opposition Result | Opposition Result | Rank |
|---|---|---|---|---|---|---|---|---|
| Aiden Moffit | 66 kg | bye | | | | | | |
| Neil MacDonald | 66 kg | | | | | | | |
| Ollie Short | 73 kg | bye | | | | | | |
| Daniel Pacitti | 73 kg | | | | | | | |
| Scott Cusack | 90 kg | - | | | | | | |
| Jaden Calder | 100 kg | - | | | | | | |
| Gregor Miller | +100 kg | - | | | | | | |

Women

| Athlete | Event | Round of 16 | Quarterfinals | Semifinals | Repechage | Final/BM | |
| Athlete | Event | Opposition Result | Opposition Result | Opposition Result | Opposition Result | Opposition Result | Rank |
|---|---|---|---|---|---|---|---|
| Eva Ewing | 48 kg | - | Dey (IND); L 0–100 | Did not advance | Barnikel (WAL); W 101s2–0s1 | Esposito (MLT); L 0s1–101 | |
| Summer Shaw | 48 kg | - | Barnikel (WAL); W 101–0s2 | Dey (IND); L 0–1s2 | —N/a | Babutsi (BOT); W 100-0 | 3rd place, bronze medalist(s) |
| Sophie Wood | 63 kg | | | | | | |
| Sunny Doig | 63 kg | | | | | | |
| Nicole Wood | 78 kg | | | | | | |
| Sarah Adlington | +78 kg | | | | | | |

== Netball ==
Scotland qualified as host for the netball competition at the 2026 Commonwealth Games.

Squad

The squad was announced on 30 June 2026.

- Emma Barrie – (GS)
- Cerys Cairns – (GA/WA)
- Iona Christian – (WA/C)
- Rachel Conway – (GK/GD)
- Cerys Finn – (GK/GD)
- Lexy Gillies – (C/WD)
- Bethan Goodwin – (GS/GA)
- Hannah Grant – (WD/GD)
- Hannah Leighton – (C/WD)
- Niamh McCall – (GA/GS)
- Jazmine Moore – (WA/C)
- Emily Nicholl – (GD/WD)

Summary

| Team | Event | Group stage | | | | | | Semifinal | Final / BM / Cl. | |
| Team | Event | Opposition Result | Opposition Result | Opposition Result | Opposition Result | Opposition Result | Rank | Opposition Result | Opposition Result | Rank |
|---|---|---|---|---|---|---|---|---|---|---|
| Scotland | Women's tournament | New Zealand | Wales | Trinidad and Tobago | Jamaica | Uganda | | | | |

Group stage

| Pos | Team | Pld | W | D | L | GF | GA | GD | Pts | Qualification |
|---|---|---|---|---|---|---|---|---|---|---|
| 1 | New Zealand | 5 | 5 | 0 | 0 | 333 | 202 | +131 | 10 | Semi-finals |
| 2 | Jamaica | 5 | 4 | 0 | 1 | 303 | 195 | +108 | 8 | Semi-finals |
| 3 | Uganda | 5 | 3 | 0 | 2 | 303 | 255 | +48 | 6 | Classification matches |
| 4 | Scotland | 5 | 2 | 0 | 3 | 276 | 258 | +18 | 4 | Classification matches |
| 5 | Wales | 5 | 1 | 0 | 4 | 236 | 284 | −48 | 2 | Classification matches |
| 6 | Trinidad and Tobago | 5 | 0 | 0 | 5 | 138 | 395 | −257 | 0 | Classification matches |

Source: Glasgow 2026

| 25 July 2026; 9:00 | Report | New Zealand | 74–44 | Scotland | OVO Hydro; Umpires: Kate Mann, Bronwen Adams; Reserve umpire: Alison Harrison |
| 25 July 2026; 9:00 | Report | Scoring by quarter: 19–11, 16–13, 18–13, 21–7 | | | OVO Hydro; Umpires: Kate Mann, Bronwen Adams; Reserve umpire: Alison Harrison |
| 25 July 2026; 9:00 | Report | Grace Nweke 29/30 (97%); Amelia Walmsley 27/33 (82%); Georgia Heffernan 11/11 (100%); Martina Salmon 7/9 (78%) | | Emma Barrie 20/23 (87%); Niamh McCall 12/17 (71%); Cerys Cairns 10/14 (71%); Bethan Goodwin 2/5 (40%) | OVO Hydro; Umpires: Kate Mann, Bronwen Adams; Reserve umpire: Alison Harrison |

| 26 July 2026; 9:00 | Report | Wales | 47–56 | Scotland | OVO Hydro; Umpires: Louise Travis, Angela Armstrong-Lush; Reserve umpire: Kate Mann |
| 26 July 2026; 9:00 | Report | Scoring by quarter: 8–16, 13–12, 12–15, 14–13 | | | OVO Hydro; Umpires: Louise Travis, Angela Armstrong-Lush; Reserve umpire: Kate Mann |
| 26 July 2026; 9:00 | Report | Nansi Kuti 29/30 (97%); Phillipa Yarranton 10/11 (91%); Georgia Rowe 8/9 (89%) | | Emma Barrie 39/41 (95%); Niamh McCall 17/20 (85%) | OVO Hydro; Umpires: Louise Travis, Angela Armstrong-Lush; Reserve umpire: Kate Mann |

| 27 July 2026; 21:00 | Report | Scotland | 77−27 | Trinidad and Tobago | OVO Hydro; Umpires: Alison Harrison, Angela Armstrong-Lush; Reserve umpire: Gareth Fowler |
| 27 July 2026; 21:00 | Report | Scoring by quarter: 24–6, 18−8, 15–7, 20−6 | | | OVO Hydro; Umpires: Alison Harrison, Angela Armstrong-Lush; Reserve umpire: Gareth Fowler |
| 27 July 2026; 21:00 | Report | Cerys Cairns 50/56 (89%); Emma Barrie 21/21 (100%); Niamh McCall 3/5 (60%); Bethan Goodwin 3/7 (43%) | | Afeisha Noel 16/17 (94%); Makayla Grant 3/3 (100%); Joelisa Cooper 3/4 (75%); Shaniya Morgan 3/7 (43%); Demisha Henry 2/3 (67%) | OVO Hydro; Umpires: Alison Harrison, Angela Armstrong-Lush; Reserve umpire: Gareth Fowler |

| 29 July 2026; 14:00 | Report | Jamaica | 45–43 | Scotland | OVO Hydro; Umpires: Angela Armstrong-Lush, Kristie Simpson; Reserve umpire: Georgina Sulley-Beales |
| 29 July 2026; 14:00 | Report | Scoring by quarter: 15–9, 12–14, 8–12, 10−8 | | | OVO Hydro; Umpires: Angela Armstrong-Lush, Kristie Simpson; Reserve umpire: Georgina Sulley-Beales |
| 29 July 2026; 14:00 | Report | Azara Wilmot 28/35 (80%); Shanice Beckford 15/18 (83%); Rhea Dixon 2/4 (50%) | | Emma Barrie 22/27 (81%); Niamh McCall 21/26 (81%) | OVO Hydro; Umpires: Angela Armstrong-Lush, Kristie Simpson; Reserve umpire: Georgina Sulley-Beales |

| 30 July 2026; 11:00 | Report | Scotland | 56–65 | Uganda | OVO Hydro; Umpires: Gareth Fowler, Ken Metekingi; Reserve umpire: Justin Barnes |
| 30 July 2026; 11:00 | Report | Scoring by quarter: 12–17, 10–16, 16–16, 18–13 | | | OVO Hydro; Umpires: Gareth Fowler, Ken Metekingi; Reserve umpire: Justin Barnes |
| 30 July 2026; 11:00 | Report | Cerys Cairns 23/26 (88%); Emma Barrie 22/26 (85%); Niamh McCall 10/12 (83%); Bethan Goodwin 1/1 (100%) | | Mary Cholhok 46/55 (84%); Shadiah Nassanga 19/20 (95%) | OVO Hydro; Umpires: Gareth Fowler, Ken Metekingi; Reserve umpire: Justin Barnes |

== Para powerlifting ==
Commonwealth Games Scotland announced its para powerlifting squad of one on 29 January 2026.

| Athlete | Event | Result | Rank |
|---|---|---|---|
| Finlay Davidson | Men's lightweight | 141.4 | 5th |
| Hope Gordon | Women's heavyweight | 75.7 | 9th |

== Swimming ==
Team Scotland announced the full 25 member Scotland swimming team for the 2026 Commonwealth Games on 22 May 2026. The team include two preselected swimmers, Duncan Scott and Angharad Evans, with a further 23 announced on that date.

Scotland's para-swimming squad of seven was announced on 22 April 2026.

Men

| Athlete | Event | Heat | | Semifinal | | Final | |
| Athlete | Event | Time | Rank | Time | Rank | Time | Rank |
|---|---|---|---|---|---|---|---|
| Jensen Norris | 100 m freestyle | 50.11 | 16 Q | 49.79 | 15 | Did not advance | |
| Stefan Krawiec | 100 m freestyle | 50.25 | 18 R | Did not advance | | | |
| Duncan Scott | 200 m freestyle | 1:47.83 | 10 R | —N/a | | Did not advance | |
| Evan Jones | 200 m freestyle | 1:49.19 | 13 | —N/a | | Did not advance | |
| Charlie Hutchison | 200 m freestyle | 1:52.20 | 21 | —N/a | | Did not advance | |
| Sean McCann | 400 m freestyle | 3:52.65 | 8 Q | —N/a | | 3:53.47 | 8 |
| Luke Hornsey | 400 m freestyle | 3:53.72 | 9 R | —N/a | | Did not advance | |
| Charlie Hutchison | 400 m freestyle | 3:55.69 | 12 | —N/a | | Did not advance | |
| Luke Hornsey | 800 m freestyle | —N/a | | | | 7:59.58 | 5 |
| Sean McCann | 800 m freestyle | —N/a | | | | 8:11.34 | 9 |
| Luke Hornsey | 1500 m freestyle | —N/a | | | | 15:31.05 | 7 |
| Sean McCann | 1500 m freestyle | —N/a | | | | DNS | – |
| Matthew Ward | 50 m backstroke | 25.16 | 8 Q | 24.95 | 8 Q | 24.75 | 7 |
| Scott Gibson | 50 m backstroke | 25.18 | 9 Q | 25.24 | 10 R | Did not advance | |
| Jamie Ferguson | 50 m backstroke | 25.52 | =14 Q | 25.37 | 13 | Did not advance | |
| Matthew Ward | 100 m backstroke | 54.04 | 2 Q | 53.59 | 5 Q | 53.62 | 6 |
| Jamie Ferguson | 100 m backstroke | 55.33 | 10 Q | 55.29 | 10 R | 55.88 | 8 |
| Matthew Ward | 200 m backstroke | DNS | – | —N/a | | Did not advance | |
| Archie Goodburn | 50 m breaststroke | 27.38 | 7 Q | 27.31 | 7 Q | 27.42 | =7 |
| George Smith | 100 m breaststroke | 1:01.63 | 11 Q | 1:01.38 | 11 | Did not advance | |
| Joshua Mitchell | 100 m breaststroke | 1:01.77 | 13 Q | 1:01.44 | 13 | Did not advance | |
| Joshua Mitchell | 200 m breaststroke | 2:13.35 | 6 Q | —N/a | | 2:12.87 | 6 |
| George Smith | 200 m breaststroke | 2:14.68 | 7 Q | —N/a | | 2:14.05 | 7 |
| Dean Fearn | 50 m butterfly | 23.66 | =4 Q | 23.50 | 7 Q | 23.56 | 8 |
| Dean Fearn | 100 m butterfly | 52.95 | 13 Q | 52.64 | 10 R | Did not advance | |
| Evan Jones | 100 m butterfly | 52.85 | 12 Q | 52.99 | 12 | Did not advance | |
| Duncan Scott | 200 m butterfly | 1:58.29 | 5 Q | —N/a | | 1:55.85 | 4 |
| Duncan Scott | 200 m individual medley | 1:58.81 | 5 Q | —N/a | | 1:56.38 GR | 1st place, gold medalist(s) |
| Evan Jones | 200 m individual medley | 1:59.04 | 7 Q | —N/a | | 1:58.74 | 7 |
| Matthew Ward | 200 m individual medley | 1:59.59 | 9 R | —N/a | | Did not advance | |
| Charlie Hutchison | 400 m individual medley | 4:23.90 | 7 Q | —N/a | | 4:22.36 | 7 |
| Stephen Clegg | 50 m freestyle S13 | 25.33 | 2 Q | —N/a | | 24.73 | 1st place, gold medalist(s) |
| James Clegg | 50 m freestyle S13 | 25.80 | 5 Q | —N/a | | 25.50 | 5 |
| Stephen Clegg | 100 m freestyle S13 | 56.57 | 1 Q | —N/a | | 55.16 | 2nd place, silver medalist(s) |
| James Clegg | 100 m freestyle S13 | 57.50 | 4 Q | —N/a | | 57.57 | =4 |
| Sam Downie | 100 m backstroke S9 | 1:09.72 | 5 Q | —N/a | | 1:08.95 | 6 |
| Oliver Carter | 100 m breaststroke SB9 | 1:16.86 | 8 Q | —N/a | | DSQ | – |
| Oliver Carter | 100 m butterfly S10 | 1:02.30 | 7 Q | —N/a | | 1:03.50 | 6 |
| Evan Jones; Duncan Scott; Matthew Ward; Dean Fearn; Stefan Krawiec; Jensen Norris; George Smith | 4 × 100 m freestyle relay | 3:18.68 | 5 Q | —N/a | | 3:15.27 | 4 |
| George Smith; Matthew Ward; Evan Jones; Duncan Scott; Charlie Hutchison; Luke Hornsey | 4 × 200 m freestyle relay | 7:17.18 | 2 Q | —N/a | | 7:11.11 | 4 |
| Matthew Ward; Archie Goodburn; Dean Fearn; Duncan Scott; Jamie Ferguson; Joshua Mitchell; Evan Jones; Jensen Norris | 4 × 100 m medley relay | 3:40.30 | 5 Q | —N/a | | 3:34.67 | 5 |

Qualifiers (Q) and reserves (R) for the latter rounds of all events were decided on a time only basis, therefore positions shown are overall results versus competitors in all heats.

Women

| Athlete | Event | Heat | | Semifinal | | Final | |
| Athlete | Event | Time | Rank | Time | Rank | Time | Rank |
|---|---|---|---|---|---|---|---|
| Emma Wood | 50 m freestyle | 25.76 | 15 Q | 25.45 | 9 R | Did not advance | |
| Evelyn Davis | 100 m freestyle | 54.81 | 4 Q | 54.33 | 5 Q | 54.40 | 5 |
| Emma Wood | 100 m freestyle | 55.35 | 12 Q | 55.39 | 11 | Did not advance | |
| Lucy Hope | 100 m freestyle | 55.94 | 18 R | Did not advance | | | |
| Megan Barnes | 200 m freestyle | 2:01.79 | 12 | —N/a | | Did not advance | |
| Evi Mackie | 400 m freestyle | 4:16.74 | 13 | —N/a | | Did not advance | |
| Megan Barnes | 400 m freestyle | DNS | – | —N/a | | Did not advance | |
| Katie Shanahan | 100 m backstroke | 1:00.99 | 5 Q | 1:00.74 | 7 Q | 1:00.88 | 6 |
| Holly McGill | 100 m backstroke | 1:02.35 | 16 Q | 1:02.16 | 13 | Did not advance | |
| Katie Shanahan | 200 m backstroke | 2:10.31 | 4 Q | —N/a | | 2:08.54 | 2nd place, silver medalist(s) |
| Holly McGill | 200 m backstroke | 2:09.98 | 2 Q | —N/a | | 2:09.16 | 4 |
| Anna Morgan | 50 m breaststroke | 30.96 | 4 Q | 31.22 | 7 Q | 31.32 | 6 |
| Angharad Evans | 100 m breaststroke | 1:06.34 | 1 Q | 1:05.34 | 1 Q | 1:06.07 | 1st place, gold medalist(s) |
| Anna Morgan | 100 m breaststroke | 1:09.21 | 13 Q | 1:09.43 | 12 | Did not advance | |
| Angharad Evans | 200 m breaststroke | 2:26.48 | 1 Q | —N/a | | 2:23.79 | 1st place, gold medalist(s) |
| Anna Morgan | 200 m breaststroke | DNS | – | —N/a | | Did not advance | |
| Lucy Grieve | 50 m butterfly | 26.69 | 9 Q | 26.46 | 8 Q | 26.42 | 7 |
| Ciara Schlosshan | 50 m butterfly | 26.50 | 6 Q | 26.53 | 9 R | Did not advance | |
| Keanna Macinnes | 100 m butterfly | 57.93 | 2 Q | 57.68 | 3 Q | 57.33 | 2nd place, silver medalist(s) |
| Ciara Schlosshan | 100 m butterfly | 58.13 | 3 Q | 57.70 | 4 Q | 57.58 | 5 |
| Lucy Grieve | 100 m butterfly | 58.29 | 4 Q | 58.17 | 6 Q | 57.90 | 6 |
| Keanna Macinnes | 200 m butterfly | 2:08.99 | 3 Q | —N/a | | 2:06.76 | 2nd place, silver medalist(s) |
| Ciara Schlosshan | 200 m butterfly | 2:08.47 | 1 Q | —N/a | | 2:08.39 | 4 |
| Faye Rogers | 200 m butterfly | 2:21.38 | 10 R | —N/a | | Did not advance | |
| Katie Shanahan | 200 m individual medley | 2:13.26 | 8 Q | —N/a | | 2:10.56 | 4 |
| Evi Mackie | 400 m individual medley | 4:53.45 | 7 Q | —N/a | | 4:51.19 | 7 |
| Astrid Carroll | 50 m freestyle S13 | 30.71 | 7 Q | —N/a | | 30.21 | 7 |
| Toni Shaw | 100 m freestyle S9 | 1:05.73 | 4 Q | —N/a | | 1:04.71 | 3rd place, bronze medalist(s) |
| Astrid Carroll | 100 m freestyle S13 | 1:05.84 | 7 Q | —N/a | | 1:05.38 | 7 |
| Toni Shaw | 100 m backstroke S9 | 1:17.83 | 8 Q | —N/a | | 1:16.88 | 7 |
| Faye Rogers | 200 m individual medley SM10 | 2:32.00 | 1 Q | —N/a | | 2:29.61 | 1st place, gold medalist(s) |
| Toni Shaw | 200 m individual medley SM10 | 2:40.67 | 5 Q | —N/a | | 2:40.31 | 5 |
| Evelyn Davis; Emma Wood; Lucy Hope; Katie Shanahan; Megan Barnes; Evi Mackie; Lucy Grieve | 4 × 100 m freestyle relay | 3:43.69 | 4 Q | —N/a | | 3:39.03 | 4 |
| Megan Barnes; Lucy Hope; Evi Mackie; Evelyn Davis | 4 × 200 m freestyle relay | —N/a | | | | 8:03.58 | 4 |
| Katie Shanahan; Angharad Evans; Keanna Macinnes; Evelyn Davis; Holly McGill; Anna Morgan; Ciara Schlosshan; Emma Wood | 4 × 100 m medley relay | 4:05.23 | 2 Q | —N/a | | 3:57.02 | 2nd place, silver medalist(s) |

Mixed

| Athlete | Event | Heat | | Final | |
| Athlete | Event | Time | Rank | Time | Rank |
|---|---|---|---|---|---|
| Evan Jones; Duncan Scott; Evelyn Davis; Katie Shanahan; Stefan Krawiec; Jensen Norris; Evi Mackie; Megan Barnes | 4 × 100 m freestyle relay | 3:31.79 | 5 Q | 3:26.20 | 5 |
| Matthew Ward; Angharad Evans; Keanna Macinnes; Duncan Scott; Dean Fearn; Lucy Grieve; Joshua Mitchell; Emma Wood | 4 × 100 m medley relay | 3:48.35 | 2 Q | 3:43.70 | 3rd place, bronze medalist(s) |

== Weightlifting ==
On 18 May 2026, the IWF Commonwealth Games weightlifting ranking lists were finalised. As host, Scotland is entitled to enter one weightlifter in every class, and its lifter were thus removed from the ranking lists. On 16 June Team Scotland released its full weightlifting squad having taken up nine of its 16 quotas following the application of its own internal selection process. The remaining seven quotas were returned to the general rankings list.

Men

| Athlete | Event | Snatch (kg) | | Clean & Jerk (kg) | | Total (kg) | Rank |
| Athlete | Event | Result | Rank | Result | Rank | Total (kg) | Rank |
|---|---|---|---|---|---|---|---|
| Corey Duncan | 71 kg | | | | | | DNF |
| Iain Wilson | 79 kg | 125 | | 156 | | 281 | 8th |
| Angus Doig | 88 kg | 135 | | 174 | | 309 | 3rd |
| Tom Wright | 94 kg | | | | | | |
| Drew Burns | 110 kg | | | | | | |

Women

| Athlete | Event | Snatch (kg) | | Clean & Jerk (kg) | | Total (kg) | Rank |
| Athlete | Event | Result | Rank | Result | Rank | Total (kg) | Rank |
|---|---|---|---|---|---|---|---|
| Alex Mackay | 48 kg | 61 | | 81 | | 142 | 7th |
| Beth Ashbee | 63 kg | 85 | | 100 | | 185 | 9th |
| Madeline Rosher | 69 kg | 97 | | 117 | | 214 | 5th |
| Agata Herbert | 77 kg | | | | | | |
