= Swimming at the 2026 Commonwealth Games – Men's 50 metre freestyle S13 =

Men's 50 metre freestyle S13 at the 2026 Commonwealth Games
- Venue: Tollcross International Swimming Centre
- Dates: 28 July
- Competitors: 9 from 6 nations
- Winning time: 24.73

Medalists
gold medal	Stephen Clegg	Scotland
silver medal	Nathan Hendricks	South Africa
bronze medal	Nicolas-Guy Turbide	Canada

The men's 50 metre freestyle S13 event at the 2026 Commonwealth Games was held on 28 July at the Tollcross International Swimming Centre.

== Schedule ==
The schedule is as follows:

All times are British Summer Time (UTC+1)

Date	Time	Round
Tuesday 28 July 2026	10:30	Heat
Tuesday 28 July 2026	19:00	Final

== Results ==
=== Heat ===
The heat was held on the morning of 28 July 2026.

Heat results
Rank	Lane	Swimmer	Nation	Time	Notes
1	2	Nicolas-Guy Turbide (S12)	Canada	25.29	Q
2	2	Stephen Clegg (S12)	Scotland	25.33	Q
3	1	Nathan Hendricks (S13)	South Africa	25.38	Q
4	1	Matthew Redfern (S13)	England	25.49	Q
5	2	James Clegg (S12)	Scotland	25.80	Q
6	1	R.V.V.B.K. Budigina (S13)	India	26.33	Q
7	2	Zhi Wei Wong (S13)	Singapore	26.94	Q
8	2	Ali Imam (S12)	India	28.41	Q
9	1	Hunter Helberg (S11)	Canada	30.31	R

=== Final ===
The final took place during of the evening of 28 July 2026.

Final results
Rank	Lane	Swimmer	Nation	Time	Notes
1st place, gold medalist(s)	5	Stephen Clegg (S12)	Scotland	24.73	
2nd place, silver medalist(s)	3	Nathan Hendricks (S13)	South Africa	24.84	
3rd place, bronze medalist(s)	4	Nicolas-Guy Turbide (S12)	Canada	24.96	
4	6	Matthew Redfern (S13)	England	25.36	
5	2	James Clegg (S12)	Scotland	25.50	
6	7	R.V.V.B.K. Budigina (S13)	India	25.68	
7	1	Zhi Wei Wong (S13)	Singapore	26.83	
8	8	Ali Imam (S12)	India	28.28	
