= Eithen Leard =

Australian basketball player

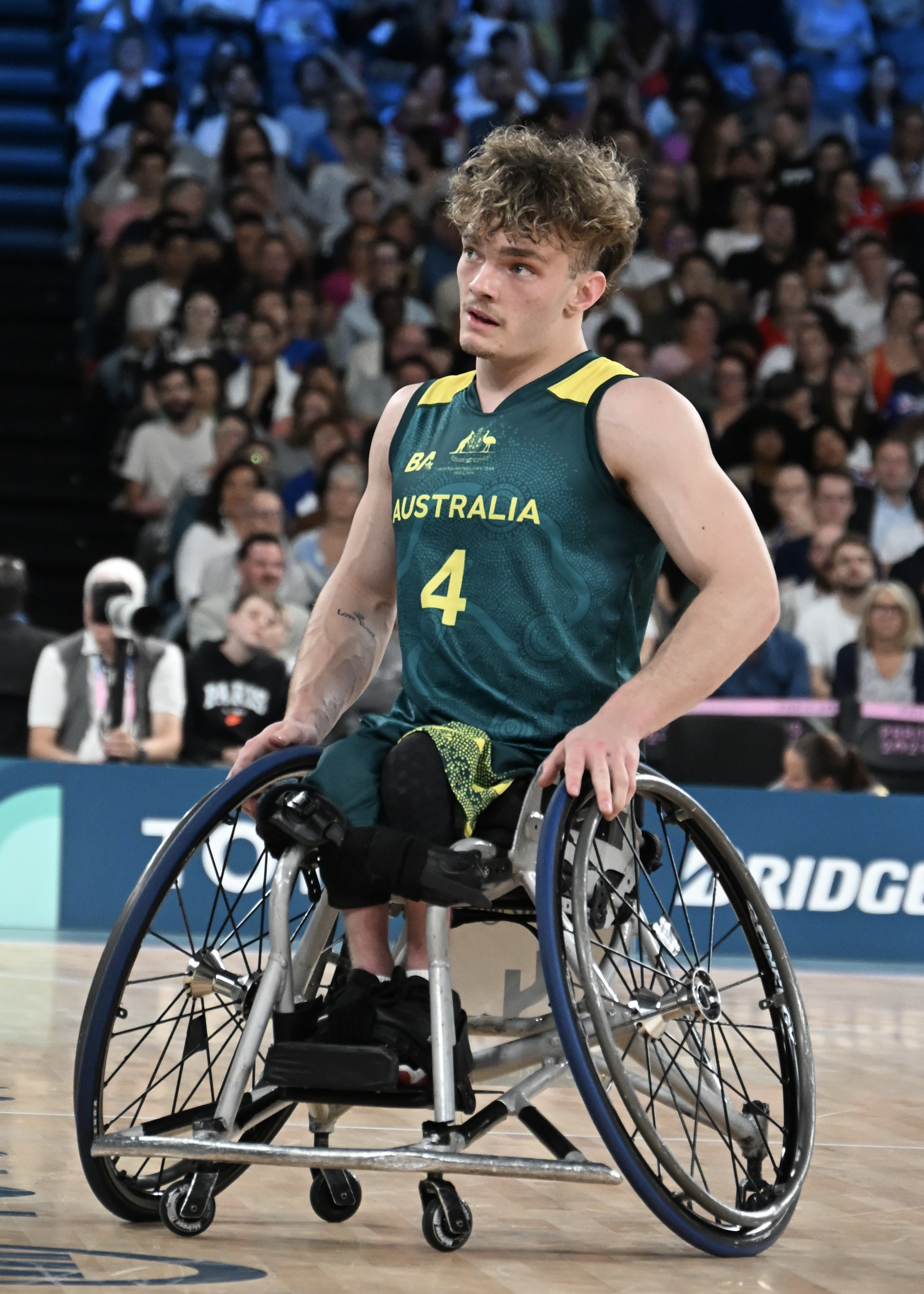
- Leard at the 2024 Summer Paralympics

Personal information
- Nationality: Australia
- Born: 31 August 2005 (age 21) Mackay, QLD, Australia

Sport
- Disability class: 2.5
- Club: Southern Districts Spartans
Medal record
Representing Australia
Men's 3x3 wheelchair basketball
Commonwealth Games
Silver medal – second place	2026 Glasgow	Team
Men's Wheelchair basketball
World Championship
Gold medal – first place	2026 Ottawa	Team

Eithen Leard (born 8 August 2005) is a 2.5 point wheelchair basketball player from Australia. He was a member of the Rollers at the 2024 Paris Paralympics.

== Early life ==
Laird was born on 8 August 2005. He was born paralysed waist down and required regular surgery to straighten his growing legs, which formed crookedly in the womb as result of his paralysis. His parents Katrina and Brett moved from Mackay, Queensland to Ipswich, Queensland to be closer medical services. He was school captain at the Sacred Heart Parish School in Booval and attended Westside Christian College.

As a twelve year old, he carried Queen's baton through Ipswich, en route to the 2018 Commonwealth Games, Gold Coast.

Leard view of disability sports is "I want to be someone that leads the normalisation of high-level disability sports” and "You get opportunities to travel the world if you work hard, the same as if you play able bodied basketball, you get the opportunities to play for your country if you work hard.”

== Basketball career ==
He started playing wheelchair basketball as five year old. At the age of nine, he took the court at the National Wheelchair Basketball Championships and was the youngest player selected in the Queensland under-23 junior development squad, the Roaring Thunder. He made his Rollers team debut at the 2022 Wheelchair Basketball World Championships in Dubai where they finished seventh. He was a member of the Rollers team at the 2024 IWBF Asia-Oceania Championships in Thailand, where they won the gold medal and qualified for 2024 Summer Paralympics.

At the 2024 Paris Paralympics, he was a member of the Rollers that finished fifth with a win/loss record of 4-4.

He was a member of the Rollers that defeated Italy 81 - 57 to win the gold medal at the 2026 Wheelchair Basketball World Championships in Ottawa, Canada.

He is a member of the Southern District Spartans in the National Wheelchair Basketball League and is supported by the Queensland Academy or Sport.
