= Judo at the 2026 Commonwealth Games – Women's 78 kg =

Judo competition

Judo – Women's 78 kg at the 2026 Commonwealth Games
- Venue: SEC Centre, Glasgow
- Date: August 2 2026
- Competitors: 10 from 9 nations

Medalists
gold medal	Emma Reid	England
silver medal	Maria Swan	Australia
bronze medal	Coralie Godbout	Canada
bronze medal	Zanet Michaelidou	Cyprus

The Women's 78 kg judo competitions at the 2026 Commonwealth Games in Glasgow, Scotland will place on August 2 at the SEC Centre. Ten judoka have been entered in this class from nine nations.

== Seedings ==
The following judoka were seeded in advance of the draw:

Women's 78 kg
Seed	Judoka	Nation
1	Emma Reid	England
2	Maria Swan	Australia
3	Coralie Godbout	Canada
4	Zanet Michaelidou	Cyprus
5	Georgika Djengue Moune	Cameroon
6	Shelley Ludford	England
7	Zeddy Cherotich	Kenya
8	Ishroop Narang	India

== Results ==
=== Gold final path ===
Round of 16
Ishroop Narang (IND)	001
Nicole Wood (SCO)	000 (yellow card)
Zeddy Cherotich (KEN)	100
Lindsy Joseph (MRI)	011

Quarterfinals
Emma Reid (ENG)	100
Ishroop Narang (IND)	000
Zanet Michaelidou (CYP)	101 (yellow card)
G Djengue Moune (CMR)	000
Maria Swan (AUS)	110 (yellow card)
Zeddy Cherotich (KEN)	000 (yellow card)
Coralie Godbout (CAN)	001 (yellow card)
Shelley Ludford (ENG)	000 (yellow card)

Semifinal
Emma Reid (ENG)	110
Zanet Michaelidou (CYP)	000
Maria Swan (AUS)	010 (yellow card)
Coralie Godbout (CAN)	000 (yellow card)

Gold medal final
Emma Reid (ENG)	100 (yellow card)
Maria Swan (AUS)	001

=== Repechage/bronze medal path ===
Competitors who are eliminated in the main draw quarter-finals enter the repechage preliminary round to contest for the bronze medals. The winners of the repechage preliminaries then meet the losing semi finalists from the opposite half of the main draw in the bronze medal finals.

Repechage
Ishroop Narang (IND)	010 (yellow card)
G Djengue Moune (CMR)	002 (yellow card)
Zeddy Cherotich (KEN)	000
Shelley Ludford (ENG)	110

Bronze medal
Ishroop Narang (IND)	000
Coralie Godbout (CAN)	001 (yellow card)
Shelley Ludford (ENG)	000
Zanet Michaelidou (CYP)	001
