= Michael Barber (athlete) =

Canadian Paralympic athlete (born 2000)

Personal information
- Born: 11 July 2000 (age 26) Victoria, British Columbia, Canada

Sport
- Sport: Paralympic athletics
- Disability class: T20
- Events: 800 metres 1500 metres
Medal record
Representing Canada
World Junior Championships
Gold medal – first place	2017 Nottwil	1500m T20
Parapan American Games
Silver medal – second place	2023 Santiago	1500m T20
Commonwealth Games
Silver medal – second place	2026 Glasgow	1500 m T20

Michael Barber (born 11 July 2000) is a Canadian Paralympic athlete who competes in international track and field competitions, he mainly competes in the 1500 metres. He is a World Junior champion and is a Parapan American Games silver medalist. His father Gary Barber competed at the 1990 Commonwealth Games.
