= Athletics at the 2026 Commonwealth Games – Men's 1500 metres (T20) =

Men's 1500 metres (T20) at the 2026 Commonwealth Games
- Venue: Scotstoun Stadium, Glasgow
- Dates: 27 July (final)
- Competitors: 8 from 4 nations
- Winning time: 3:57.25

Medalists
gold medal	Ben Sandilands	Scotland
silver medal	Michael Barber	Canada
bronze medal	Steven Bryce	Scotland

The men's 1500 metres (T20) event at the 2026 Commonwealth Games, as part of the para-athletics programme, took place at the Scotstoun Stadium on 27 July 2026. The event consisted of a single final.

The event was open to male para-athletes in the T20 classification for para-athletes with an intellectual impairment. This is a new event on the Games programme.

Reigning world record holder and Paralympic Games champion Ben Sandilands won the first Commonwealth Games gold medal of his career, representing Scotland, having been forced to pull out of the 2025 World Para Athletics Championships.

== Records ==
Prior to this competition, the existing world record was as follows:

Records T20
World record	3:44.90	Ben Sandilands (GBR)	Trafford, England	9 August 2025

== Qualification ==
Para athletic event qualification is regulated by a special system organised between Commonwealth Sport and the International Paralympic Committee. Each para athletic event allowed for eight quota places, or 10 in the case of throwing events. All but one quota in each event was available on the basis of the Commonwealth Para Rankings on 31 Match 2026, to a maximum of two per Commonwealth Games Association (CGA), with the remaining quota allocated by Bipartite invitation.

This list did not set a limit on entrants, as other athletes in the same classification, but qualified directly for another event, could enter the event in question, up to a maximum (combined quota, invitation and 'separate event' quota) of three per event per CGA.

In the case of the men's 1500 metres (T2), one other event - the T20 long jump - shares the classification.

== Schedule ==
The schedule is as follows:

Date	Time	Round
27 July 2026	18:30	Final

All times are United Kingdom time (UTC+1)

== Results ==
=== Final ===
The final of the men's 1500 metres (T20) was scheduled for the evening session of 27 July 2026.

Place	Athlete	Time	Notes
1st place, gold medalist(s)	Ben Sandilands (SCO)	3:57.25	SB
2nd place, silver medalist(s)	Michael Barber (CAN)	4:01.84	
3rd place, bronze medalist(s)	Steven Bryce (SCO)	4:02.40	SB
4	Archer Hewitt (AUS)	4:07.71	AR, PB
5	Daniel Wolff (ENG)	4:09.27	SB
6	Owen Miller (SCO)	4:09.61	SB
7	Kieran O'Hara (ENG)	4:10.03	SB
8	Daniel Milone (AUS)	4:17.18	SB
