= 3x3 basketball at the 2026 Commonwealth Games – Men's wheelchair tournament =

Men's 3x3 wheelchair basketball tournament at the 2026 Commonwealth Games
- Venue: SEC Centre, Glasgow
- Dates: 24 – 29 July 2026
- Competitors: 32 from 8 nations

Medalists
gold medal	Tomas Klein; Eithen Leard; Tom O'Neill-Thorne; Luke Pople	Australia
silver medal	James Hazell; Tom Harvey; Oscar Knight; Peter Cusack	England
bronze medal	Garrett Ostepchuk; Lee Melymick; Kyrell Sopotyk; Reed De’Aeth	Canada

The men's 3x3 wheelchair basketball tournament at the 2026 Commonwealth Games was held in the SEC Centre, Glasgow between 24 and 29 July 2026. This was the second appearance of the discipline at the Games, and Australia returned as defending champions. The tournament expanded from six to eight teams. Australia won the gold medal, defeating England in the final. Canada won the bronze medal.

== Qualification ==
Scotland qualified as host nation, four nations qualified by winning their respective IWBF zonal qualifiers, and the rest received Bipartite Invitations.

Means of qualification	Quotas	Qualified
Host Nation	1	Scotland
IWBF Africa Qualifier	1	South Africa
IWBF Americas Qualifier	1	Canada
IWBF Asia-Pacific	2	Malaysia; Australia
IWBF Europe Qualifier	1	England
Bipartite Invitation	2	Wales; Kenya
TOTAL	8	

== Rosters ==
CGA	Players			
Australia	Tomas Klein	Eithen Leard	Tom O'Neill-Thorne	Luke Pople
Canada	Garrett Ostepchuk	Lee Melymick	Kyrell Sopotyk	Reed De’Aeth
Kenya	Ian Chege	Milton Ilahuya	Itaken Kipelian	Robert Ngugi
England	James Hazell	Tom Harvey	Oscar Knight	Peter Cusack
Malaysia	Muhammad Roozaimi Johari	Muhammad Hafiz Ramli	Freday Yei Bing Tan	Muhamad Atib Zakaria
Scotland	Tyler Baines	Ross McConnell	Finlay Erskine	Shayne Humphries
South Africa	Zakhele Shelembe	Shane Williams	Xola Yalezo	Simanga Mbhele
Wales	Alex Wilson	Ben Johnson-Rolfe	Dan May	Will Bishop

== Competition format ==
Eight teams were drawn into two groups. Upon completion of a full round robin, the top team in each group advance to the semi-finals; the teams in second and third advance to the Play-ins, or 'play-ins'.

== Group stage ==
All times based on British Summer Time (UTC+01:00)

=== Group A ===
Pos	Team	Pld	W	L	PF	PA	PD	Qualification
1	England	3	3	0	57	23	+34	Semi-finals
2	Australia	3	2	1	54	33	+21	Play-ins
3	Canada	3	1	2	38	43	−5	Play-ins
4	Kenya	3	0	3	8	58	−50	

Source: Glasgow 2026
Rules for classification: 1) Wins; 2) Head-to-head record; 3) Points scored.

24 July 2026
12:40

Report

Canada	16–3	Kenya
Pts: De'Aeth 8		Pts: Ngugi 2

SEC Centre, Glasgow

24 July 2026
16:35

Report

England	16–13	Australia
Pts: Cusack 7		Pts: O'Neill-Thorne, Pople 4

SEC Centre, Glasgow

26 July 2026
12:20

Report

Australia	21–5	Kenya
Pts: Klein 8		Pts: Ilahuya 4

SEC Centre, Glasgow

26 July 2026
14:00

Report

England	20–10	Canada
Pts: Knight 7		Pts: Ostepchuk, De'Aeth 3

SEC Centre, Glasgow

27 July 2026
12:45

Report

Australia	20–12	Canada
Pts: O'Neill-Thorne 10		Pts: De'Aeth 9

SEC Centre, Glasgow

27 July 2026
14:25

Report

Kenya	0–21	England
		Pts: Harvey, Knight 6

SEC Centre, Glasgow

=== Group B ===
Pos	Team	Pld	W	L	PF	PA	PD	Qualification
1	Scotland	3	3	0	54	25	+29	Semi-finals
2	South Africa	3	2	1	38	37	+1	Play-ins
3	Wales	3	1	2	36	50	−14	Play-ins
4	Malaysia	3	0	3	29	45	−16	

Source: Glasgow 2026
Rules for classification: 1) Wins; 2) Head-to-head record; 3) Points scored.

25 July 2026
11:40

Report

Scotland	15–9	South Africa
Pts: Erskine 11		Pts: Yalezo 4

SEC Centre, Glasgow

25 July 2026
16:35

Report

Wales	14–13	Malaysia
Pts: May 8		Pts: Zakaria 10

SEC Centre, Glasgow

26 July 2026
17:00

Report

South Africa	16–12	Wales
Pts: Shelembe 6		Pts: Marshall-Wilson 8

SEC Centre, Glasgow

26 July 2026
17:00

Report

Malaysia	6–18	Scotland
Pts: Zakaria 3		Pts: Erskine 12

SEC Centre, Glasgow

27 July 2026
18:15

Report

Malaysia	10–13	South Africa
Pts: three players 3		Pts: Williams 6

SEC Centre, Glasgow

27 July 2026
19:55

Report

Wales	10–21	Scotland
Pts: May 7		Pts: Erskine 13

SEC Centre, Glasgow

== Knockout stage ==
Play-ins
28 July
Australia	21
Wales	6
28 July
South Africa	5
Canada	15

Semi-finals
29 July
Scotland	12
Australia	19
29 July
England	18
Canada	13

Gold medal match
29 July
Australia	19
England	13
Bronze medal match
29 July
Scotland	9
Canada	19

=== Play-ins ===
28 July 2026
18:30

Report

Australia	21–6	Wales
Pts: Leard 8		Pts: May 4

SEC Centre, Glasgow

28 July 2026
19:00

Report

South Africa	5–15	Canada
Pts: Williams 4		Pts: De'Aeth, Sopotyk 5

SEC Centre, Glasgow

=== Semi-finals ===
29 July 2026
12:30

Report

Scotland	12–19	Australia
Pts: Erskine 9		Pts: O'Neill-Thorne 8

SEC Centre, Glasgow

29 July 2026
13:00

Report

England	18–13	Canada
Pts: Knight 9		Pts: De'Eath 10

SEC Centre, Glasgow

=== Bronze medal match ===
29 July 2026
17:30

Report

Scotland	9–19	Canada
Pts: Erskine 8		Pts: De'Eath 9

SEC Centre, Glasgow

=== Gold medal match ===
29 July 2026
18:30

Report

Australia	19–13	England
Pts: Leard 10		Pts: Knight 6

SEC Centre, Glasgow

== Final ranking ==
Rank	Team
1st place, gold medalist(s)	Australia
2nd place, silver medalist(s)	England
3rd place, bronze medalist(s)	Canada
4	Scotland
5	South Africa
6	Wales
7	Malaysia
8	Kenya
