= Judo at the 2026 Commonwealth Games – Women's 48 kg =

Judo competition

Judo – Women's 48 kg at the 2026 Commonwealth Games
- Venue: SEC Centre, Glasgow
- Date: 31 July 2026

Medalists
gold medal	Asmita Dey	India
silver medal	Heidi Quach	Canada
bronze medal	Katryna Esposito	Malta
bronze medal	Summer Shaw	Scotland

The Women's 48 kg judo competitions at the 2026 Commonwealth Games in Glasgow, Scotland took place on 31 July at the SEC Centre. Eight judoka, representing seven nations, entered this weight class.

== Seedings ==
With only eight entrants, all judoka were seeded, one to eight, prior to the beginning of the event.

Women's 48 kg
Seed	Judoka	Nation
1	Asmita Dey	India
2	Heidi Quach	Canada
3	Katryna Esposito	Malta
4	Summer Shaw	Scotland
5	Ashleigh Barnikel	Wales
6	Marie Thomas	Mauritius
7	Botho Babutsi	Botswana
8	Eva Ewing	Scotland

== Results ==
=== Gold final path ===
Quarterfinals
Asmita Dey (IND)	100
Eva Ewing (SCO)	000
Summer Shaw (SCO)	101
Ashleigh Barnikel (WAL)	000
Heidi Quach (CAN)	110
Botho Babutsi (BOT)	000
Katryna Esposito (MLT)	010
Marie Thomas (MRI)	000 (yellow card)

Semifinal
Asmita Dey (IND)	001
Summer Shaw (SCO)	000
Heidi Quach (CAN)	101 (yellow card)
Katryna Esposito (MLT)	001

Gold medal final
Asmita Dey (IND)	002 (yellow card)
Heidi Quach (CAN)	001

=== Repechage/bronze medal path ===
Competitors who lost to the gold medal finalists in earlier rounds enter the repechage to contest for the bronze medals.

Repechage
Eva Ewing (SCO)	101
Ashleigh Barnikel (WAL)	000 (yellow card)
Botho Babutsi (BOT)	100 (yellow card)
Marie Thomas (MRI)	001

Bronze medal
Eva Ewing (SCO)	000 (yellow card)
Katryna Esposito (MLT)	101
Botho Babutsi (BOT)	000
Summer Shaw (SCO)	100
