= Coralie Godbout =

Canadian judoka

Personal information
- Born: 22 May 2001 (age 25) Lévis, Quebec, Canada
- Education: Cégep Marie-Victorin
- Occupation: Judoka
- Height: 176 cm (5 ft 9 in)

Sport
- Country: Canada
- Sport: Judo
- Weight class: ‍–‍78 kg

Achievements and titles
- World Champ.: R32 (2026)
- Pan American Champ.: (silver) (2025)
- Commonwealth Games: (bronze) (2026)
Medal record
Women's judo
Representing Canada
Pan American Championships
Silver medal – second place	2025 Santiago	‍–‍78 kg
Bronze medal – third place	2026 Panama City	‍–‍78 kg
IJF Grand Prix
Bronze medal – third place	2024 Zagreb	‍–‍78 kg
Bronze medal – third place	2025 Lima	‍–‍78 kg
Pan American Junior Championships
Bronze medal – third place	2018 La Paz	‍–‍70 kg
Commonwealth Games
Bronze medal – third place	2026 Glasgow	‍–‍78 kg
Jeux de la Francophonie
Silver medal – second place	2023 Kinshasa	‍–‍78 kg

Profile at external databases
- IJF: 40143
- JudoInside.com: 102931
- Updated on 9 October 2026

Coralie Godbout (born 22 May 2001) is a Canadian female judoka.

== Sporting career ==
In 2023, Coralie Godbout was ranked 64th in the world in the under 78 kg category.

Godbout became Canadian champion for the second time in her weight class, having previously won her first title in 2017 in the under-18 division. She won her first Grand Prix medal in Zagreb in September 2024, finishing third following the disqualification of French judoka Liz Ngelebeya.

She won her first major medal at the 2025 Pan American Judo Championships in Santiago, where she was defeated in the final by Colombian judoka Brenda Olaya, earning the silver medal.

In June 2025, she won the gold medal at the Pan American Open in Santo Domingo. She placed third at the 2025 Judo Grand Prix Lima in October, and in December she finished seventh in the under 78 kg category at the Tokyo Grand Slam.

== Medals ==
=== International ===
Year	Tournament	Result	Weight class
2025	2025 Pan American-Oceania Judo Championships	Silver	-78 kg

=== Grand Prixes ===
Year	Tournament	Result	Weight class
2024	2024 Judo Grand Prix Zagreb	Third	-78 kg
2025	2025 Judo Grand Prix Lima	Third	-78 kg
