= Swimming at the 2026 Commonwealth Games – Men's 100 metre freestyle S13 =

Men's 100 metre freestyle S13 at the 2026 Commonwealth Games
- Venue: Tollcross International Swimming Centre
- Dates: 24 July
- Competitors: 8 from 6 nations
- Winning time: 54.54

Medalists
gold medal	Nathan Hendricks (S13)	South Africa
silver medal	Stephen Clegg (S12)	Scotland
bronze medal	Matthew Redfern (S13)	England

The men's 100 metre freestyle S13 event at the 2026 Commonwealth Games was held on 24 July at the Tollcross International Swimming Centre. Open to swimmers with a visual impairment in both the S12 and S13 classifications, the event was won by Nathan Hendricks of South Africa.

== Schedule ==
The schedule was as follows:

All times are British Summer Time (UTC+1)

Date	Time	Round
Friday 24 July 2026	11:10	Heat
Friday 24 July 2026	19:30	Final

== Results ==
=== Heat ===
The heat was held at 11:10 on 24 July 2026.

Heat results
Rank	Lane	Swimmer	Nation	Time	Notes
1	5	Stephen Clegg (S12)	Scotland	56.57	Q
2	4	Nathan Hendricks (S13)	South Africa	56.66	Q
3	2	R.V.V.B.K. Budigina (S13)	India	57.10	Q
4	3	James Clegg (S12)	Scotland	57.50	Q
5	6	Matthew Redfern (S13)	England	58.07	Q
6	7	Zhi Wei Wong (S13)	Singapore	59.93	Q
7	1	Hunter Helberg (S11)	Canada	1:05.24	Q
8	8	Ali Imam (S12)	India	1:05.32	Q

=== Final ===
The final was held at 19:30 on 24 July 2026.

Final results
Rank	Lane	Swimmer	Nation	Time	Notes
1st place, gold medalist(s)	5	Nathan Hendricks (S13)	South Africa	54.54	
2nd place, silver medalist(s)	4	Stephen Clegg (S12)	Scotland	55.16	
3rd place, bronze medalist(s)	2	Matthew Redfern (S13)	England	56.86	
4	3	R.V.V.B.K. Budigina (S13)	India	57.57	
4	6	James Clegg (S12)	Scotland	57.57	
6	7	Zhi Wei Wong (S13)	Singapore	58.98	
7	8	Ali Imam (S12)	India	1:03.73	
8	1	Hunter Helberg (S11)	Canada	1:04.02	
