= 2026 African Judo Championships =

Judo competition

2026 Judo African Judo Championships
- Venue: Kasarani Indoor Arena
- Location: Nairobi, Kenya
- Dates: 24–26 April 2026
- No. of events: 15 (7 men, 7 women, 1 mixed)

Competition at external databases
- Links: IJF • JudoInside

The 2026 African Judo Championships is the 47th edition of the African Judo Championships. It was held at the Moi International Sports Centre in Nairobi, Kenya from 24 to 26 April 2026. The last day of competition featured a mixed team event.

== Medal summary ==
=== Men's events ===
| Event | Gold | Silver | Bronze |
|---|---|---|---|
| Extra-lightweight (−60 kg) | Ahmed Alaoui Cherifi (MAR) | Leonardo Barros (ANG) | Younes Ben Laribi (ALG) |
| Extra-lightweight (−60 kg) | Ahmed Alaoui Cherifi (MAR) | Leonardo Barros (ANG) | Raoul Brillant Nganji (BDI) |
| Half-lightweight (−66 kg) | Kais Moudetere (ALG) | Edmilson Pedro (ANG) | Abderrahmane Boushita (MAR) |
| Half-lightweight (−66 kg) | Kais Moudetere (ALG) | Edmilson Pedro (ANG) | Oumar Mballo (SEN) |
| Lightweight (−73 kg) | Messaoud Dris (ALG) | Hassan Doukkali (MAR) | Ismael Alhassane (NIG) |
| Lightweight (−73 kg) | Messaoud Dris (ALG) | Hassan Doukkali (MAR) | Zeferino Gabriel (ANG) |
| Half-middleweight (−81 kg) | Timothy Meuwsen (RSA) | Abdelrahman Abdelghany (EGY) | Mahamadou Doucara (MLI) |
| Half-middleweight (−81 kg) | Timothy Meuwsen (RSA) | Abdelrahman Abdelghany (EGY) | Abdeslam Belbelhout (ALG) |
| Middleweight (−90 kg) | Abdalla Abdelsamea (EGY) | Ammar Abohashim (EGY) | Ryan Dacosta (SEN) |
| Middleweight (−90 kg) | Abdalla Abdelsamea (EGY) | Ammar Abohashim (EGY) | Rémi Feuillet (MRI) |
| Half-heavyweight (−100 kg) | Omar Elramly (EGY) | Koussay Ben Ghares (TUN) | Franck Ulrick Tahman Zan (CMR) |
| Half-heavyweight (−100 kg) | Omar Elramly (EGY) | Koussay Ben Ghares (TUN) | Rayane Zakaria Benatia (ALG) |
| Heavyweight (+100 kg) | Mohamed El Mehdi Lili (ALG) | Mohamed Aborakia (EGY) | Mohammed Lahboub (MAR) |
| Heavyweight (+100 kg) | Mohamed El Mehdi Lili (ALG) | Mohamed Aborakia (EGY) | Daniel Mepoui Anong (CMR) |

=== Women's events ===
| Event | Gold | Silver | Bronze |
|---|---|---|---|
| Extra-lightweight (−48 kg) | Maria Segunda (ANG) | Signoline Kanyamuneza (BDI) | Oumaima Bedioui (TUN) |
| Extra-lightweight (−48 kg) | Maria Segunda (ANG) | Signoline Kanyamuneza (BDI) | Noura Salem (EGY) |
| Half-lightweight (−52 kg) | Soumiya Iraoui (MAR) | Marie Céline Baba Matia (CMR) | Lycia Guebli (ALG) |
| Half-lightweight (−52 kg) | Soumiya Iraoui (MAR) | Marie Céline Baba Matia (CMR) | Rahma Tibi (TUN) |
| Lightweight (−57 kg) | Mariem Jmour (TUN) | Andreza Antonio (ANG) | Wissal Ziane (MAR) |
| Lightweight (−57 kg) | Mariem Jmour (TUN) | Andreza Antonio (ANG) | Mariana Esteves (GUI) |
| Half-middleweight (−63 kg) | Yassamine Djellab (ALG) | Maram Jmour (TUN) | Boushra Edris (EGY) |
| Half-middleweight (−63 kg) | Yassamine Djellab (ALG) | Maram Jmour (TUN) | Seraphine Kongolo Bitota (COD) |
| Middleweight (−70 kg) | Diassonema Mucungui (ANG) | Farida Magdy (EGY) | Zita Ornella Biami (CMR) |
| Middleweight (−70 kg) | Diassonema Mucungui (ANG) | Farida Magdy (EGY) | Aina Laura Rasoanaivo Razafy (MAD) |
| Half-heavyweight (−78 kg) | Arij Akkab (TUN) | Marie Branser (GUI) | Georgika Wesly Djengue Moune (CMR) |
| Half-heavyweight (−78 kg) | Arij Akkab (TUN) | Marie Branser (GUI) | Zeddy Cherotich (KEN) |
| Heavyweight (+78 kg) | Siwar Dhawedi (TUN) | Dyhia Benchallal (ALG) | Safa Soliman (EGY) |
| Heavyweight (+78 kg) | Siwar Dhawedi (TUN) | Dyhia Benchallal (ALG) | Esther Mbezele Atangana (CMR) |

Source results:

=== Mixed events ===
| Event | Gold | Silver | Bronze |
|---|---|---|---|
| Mixed team | Egypt | Tunisia | Algeria |
| Mixed team | Egypt | Tunisia | Cameroon |

Source results:

=== Medal table ===
* Host nation (Kenya)

| Rank | Nation | Gold | Silver | Bronze | Total |
|---|---|---|---|---|---|
| 1 | Algeria (ALG) | 4 | 1 | 5 | 10 |
| 2 | Egypt (EGY) | 3 | 4 | 3 | 10 |
| 3 | Tunisia (TUN) | 3 | 3 | 2 | 8 |
| 4 | Angola (ANG) | 2 | 3 | 1 | 6 |
| 5 | Morocco (MAR) | 2 | 1 | 3 | 6 |
| 6 | South Africa (RSA) | 1 | 0 | 0 | 1 |
| 7 | Cameroon (CMR) | 0 | 1 | 6 | 7 |
| 8 | Burundi (BDI) | 0 | 1 | 1 | 2 |
| 8 | Guinea (GUI) | 0 | 1 | 1 | 2 |
| 10 | Senegal (SEN) | 0 | 0 | 2 | 2 |
| 11 | DR Congo (COD) | 0 | 0 | 1 | 1 |
| 11 | Kenya (KEN)* | 0 | 0 | 1 | 1 |
| 11 | Madagascar (MAD) | 0 | 0 | 1 | 1 |
| 11 | Mali (MLI) | 0 | 0 | 1 | 1 |
| 11 | Mauritius (MRI) | 0 | 0 | 1 | 1 |
| 11 | Niger (NIG) | 0 | 0 | 1 | 1 |
| Totals (16 entries) | | 15 | 15 | 30 | 60 |
