= Nathan Hendricks =

South African Paralympic swimmer (born 2005)

Personal information
- Nationality: South African
- Born: 4 August 2005 (age 20)

Sport
- Sport: Paralympic swimming
- Disability: Stargardt disease
- Disability class: S13
Medal record
Men's para swimming
Representing South Africa
Commonwealth Games
Gold medal – first place	2026 Glasgow	100 m freestyle S13

Nathan Hendricks (born 4 August 2005) is a South African Paralympic swimmer. He represented South Africa at the 2024 Summer Paralympics.

== Career ==
Hendricks represented South Africa at the 2024 Summer Paralympics and advanced to four finals. During the 200 metre individual medley SM13 event he set an African record time of 2:17.15.

In July 2026, he competed at the 2026 Commonwealth Games and won a gold medal in the 100 m freestyle S13 event. This marked South Africa's first gold medal of the competition. He later won the silver medal in the men's 50 metre freestyle S13, finishing in 24.84 seconds, 0.11 seconds behind Scotland's Stephen Clegg.

== Personal life ==
Hendricks was born to Darryl and Jennifer. He was diagnosed with diabetes as a toddler before being diagnosed with Stargardt disease at 12 years old.
