= Robyn Love =

British wheelchair basketball player

Robyn Love PLY
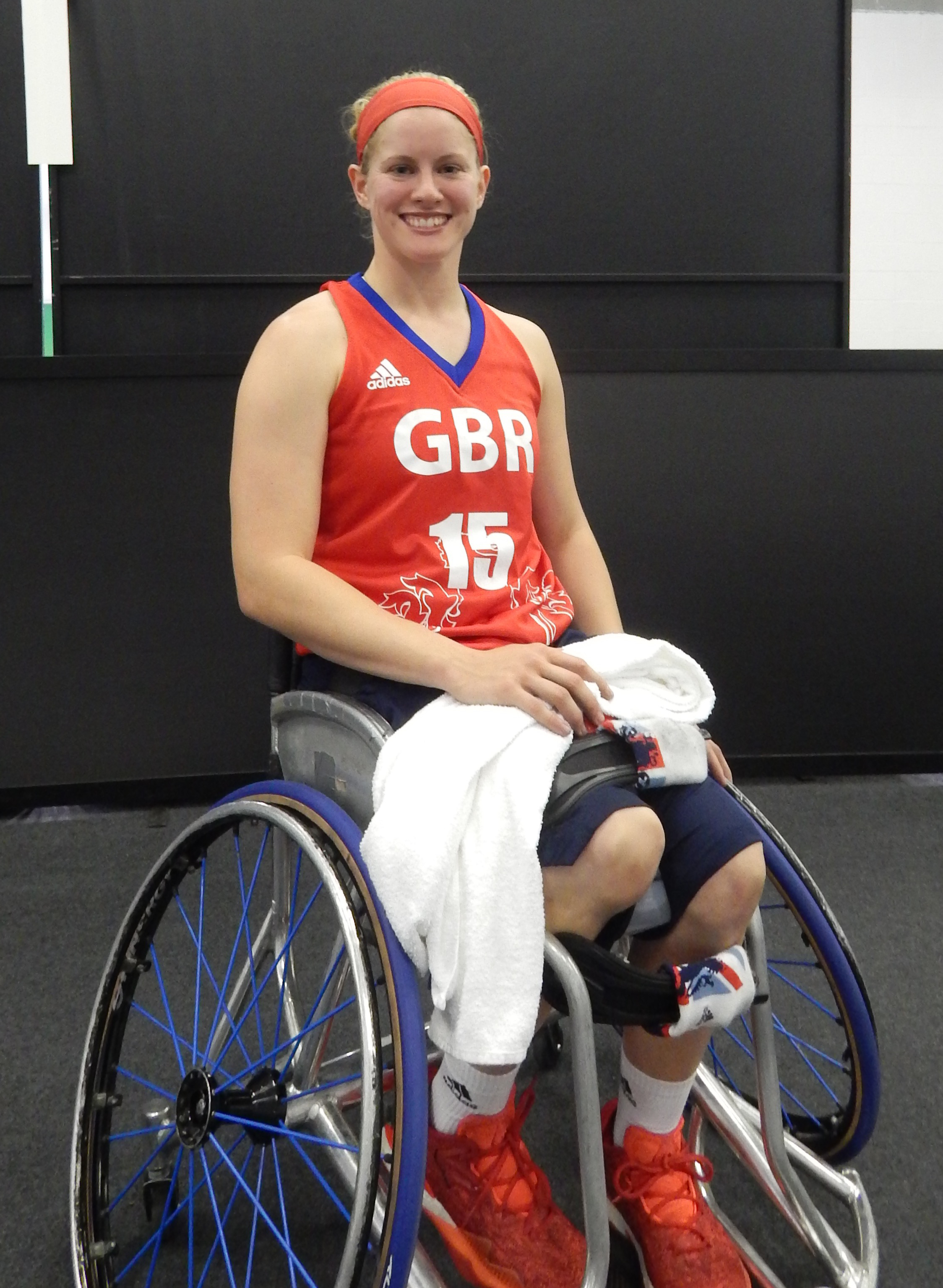
- Robyn Love

Personal information
- Nationality: British
- Born: 28 August 1990 (age 36) Ayr, Scotland
- Height: 164 cm (5 ft 5 in)
- Weight: 60 kg (132 lb)

Sport
- Country: Great Britain; Scotland
- Sport: Wheelchair basketball
- Disability class: 3.5
- Event: Women's team
- Club: Lothian Phoenix
Medal record
Women's wheelchair basketball
Representing Great Britain
World Championships
Silver medal – second place	2018 Hamburg	Team
European Championships
Silver medal – second place	2023 Rotterdam	Team
Silver medal – second place	2025 Sarajevo	Team
Bronze medal – third place	2015 Worcester	Team
Bronze medal – third place	2017 Tenriffe	Team
Women's 3x3 wheelchair basketball
Representing Scotland
Commonwealth Games
Silver medal – second place	2026 Glasgow	Team

Robyn Love (born 28 August 1990) is a 3.5 point British wheelchair basketball player who represented Great Britain at the 2016 Paralympic Games and 2024 Paralympic Games, and Scotland at the 2026 Commonwealth Games.

== Biography ==
Robyn Love was born in Ayr, Scotland, on 28 August 1990. She was born with arthrogryposis, a rare condition in which the muscles are shortened, due to the wrapping of the umbilical cord around her legs. As a result, her right leg is shorter than her left, and she is missing muscles in both legs. At school, she played football and tennis, but refused to participate in athletics because she knew her disability prevented her from running as fast as the other kids. During her 2008 gap year before university, surgeons at Glasgow Royal Infirmary attempted to lengthen her leg by breaking it and using plaster and pins to keep it straight. The pins had to be tightened daily, which was excruciatingly painful. They also inserted a plate in her femur that helped her walk better, but her right leg remained 10 centimetres (3.9 in) shorter, and she still walked with a limp. In 2009, she entered Edinburgh Napier University, where she studied biomedical sciences. One of the first things she did was to find sports organisations, and she started playing basketball.

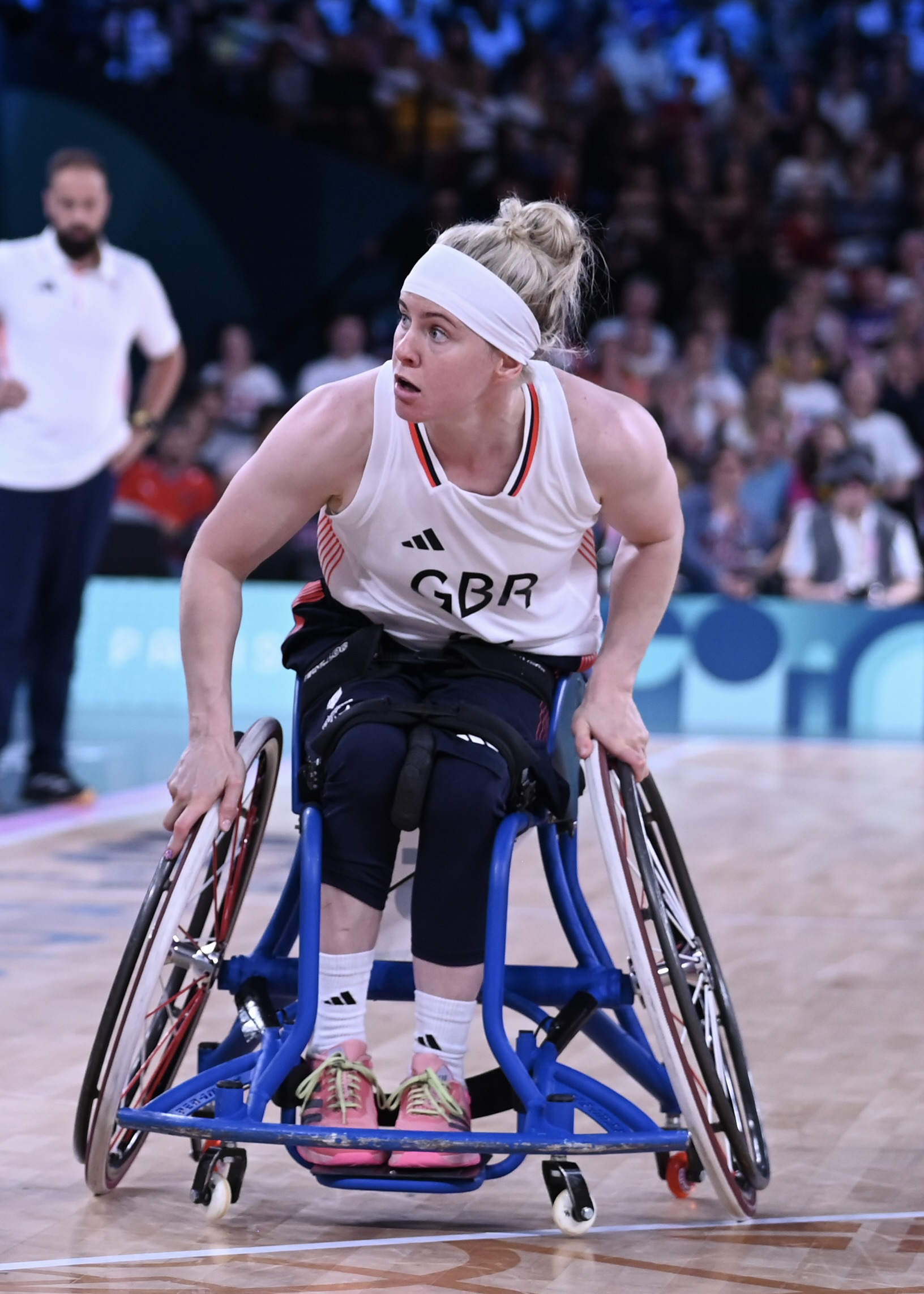
In action against Canada at the 2024 Summer Paralympics in Paris

By embracing her disability, Love was set on the path to becoming an elite athlete. A friend suggested she try wheelchair basketball. Love attended a "come and try" day run by the Lothian Phoenix club in November 2013, and met Tina Gordon from Sportscotland, who became her coach. Love was classified a 3.5-point player, and Gordon trained her, and even bought her a £1,000 wheelchair basketball sports chair. Love played her first wheelchair basketball game in January 2014, shooting 16 points in a winning game. She went on to win the Scottish Cup with Lothian Phoenix and the Scottish Universities Cup with Edinburgh Napier University. In October 2014, she attended a national team training camp, and in 2015 she relocated to the University of Worcester, where the national team is based. She made her international debut with the national team at the Osaka Cup in Japan in February 2015, winning silver. This was followed by bronze at the European Championships in September 2015, securing a place for the British team at the 2016 Paralympic Games in Rio de Janeiro. In May 2016, she was selected as part of the side for Rio. The British team produced its best ever performance at the Paralympics, making it all the way to the semi-finals, but lost to the semi-final to the United States, and then the bronze medal match to the Netherlands.

== Achievements ==
- 2015: Bronze at the European Championships (Worcester, England)
- 2016: Fourth at the 2016 Paralympics (Rio de Janeiro, Brazil)
- 2017: Bronze at the European Championships (Tenerife, Spain)
- 2018: Silver at the 2018 Wheelchair Basketball World Championship (Hamburg, Germany)
- 2024: Fifth at the 2024 Paralympics (Paris, France)

== Personal life ==
Love is openly lesbian. She is engaged to fellow wheelchair basketball player Laurie Williams. They have a child together.
