= Westside Christian College =

Location
- Goodna, Queensland; Australia; 27.611°S 152.887°E

Information
- Type: Private, co-ed, Christian
- Motto: In Thy Light
- Denomination: Christian
- Established: 1977
- Principal: Craig Schmidt
- Colours: Green, navy, gold
- Website: www.wcc.qld.edu.au

Westside Christian College is a Christian school located in Goodna, Ipswich, Queensland, Australia. It is coeducational and teaches students from Pre-Prep to Year 12. The current Principal of the College is Craig Schmidt. Rob Pattearson is the current Head of the Secondary College.

== History ==
The school was opened as Goodna Christian School in 1977. In 2005 the Australian Government's Department of Education, Employment and Workplace Relations awarded the school A$115,000 for premises improvement and in 2006 over A$125,000.

== Principals ==
- 1977 Paul Colen
- 1978–1984 Ron Norman
- 1985–2015 Christopher Meadows
- 2016–2021 Barry Leverton
- 2022–present Craig Schmidt

== Timeline ==
- 1957 – The Reformed Churches of Australia began a campaign to promote Christian education in the form of Christian Parent-Controlled Schools.
- 1962 – The Multi-denominational Association for Parent-Controlled Christian Schools (APCCS) of Brisbane was founded.
- 1965 – The National Union of Associations for Christian Parent-Controlled Schools (NUACPCS) was founded.
- 1965 – Organizational structure of APCCS was revised to include an elected board of directors with subordinate subcommittees.
- 1972 – Land was purchased for Goodna Christian School.
- 1976 – Construction for first phase completed.
- 1977 – February, official opening as primary school.
- 1977 – March, Dedication Service
- 1981 – Adjacent lot of land purchased for planned expansion; grade 8 added, each year another grade added to grade 12.
- 1992 – More land purchased for additional expansion.
- 1995 – Preschool classes added and located in new building with grades 1 to 3 & a1/2.
- 1995 – Name changed to Westside Christian College.
- 2002 – 25th anniversary celebration and special reunion was held.
- 2017 – 40th anniversary celebration and reunion dinner on 26 May.

== Programs ==
Westside Christian College is registered on the Commonwealth Register of Institutions and Courses for Overseas Students.
