= Summer Shaw (judoka) =

British judoka (born 2004)

Personal information
- Born: 5 June 2004 (age 22)
- Occupation: Judoka

Sport
- Country: Great Britain
- Sport: Judo
- Weight class: ‍–‍48 kg

Achievements and titles
- Commonwealth Games: (bronze) (2026)
Medal record
Women's judo
Representing Scotland
Commonwealth Games
Bronze medal – third place	2026 Glasgow	‍–‍48 kg
Representing Great Britain
European Youth Olympic Festival
Bronze medal – third place	2022 Poreč	‍–‍48 kg

Profile at external databases
- IJF: 51817
- JudoInside.com: 110050
- Updated on 4 August 2026

Summer Shaw (born 5 June 2004) is a British judoka. She won a bronze medal competing for Scotland at the 2026 Commonwealth Games in Glasgow.

== Career ==
A member of Camberley Judo Club in Surrey, Shaw was the 2022 European Youth Olympic Festival bronze medallist. She also won silver medals in the -48kg category at the 2024 Kaunas Junior European Cup and 2024 Birmingham Junior European Cup.

Shaw became senior British Champion with gold in the -48kg category at the 2025 British Championships. Shaw won the bronze medal in the -48 kg in 2025 and 2026 at the Tallinn European Open.

Shaw won a bronze medal competing for Scotland at the 2026 Commonwealth Games in Glasgow in the 48kg division, having entered the competition as the fourth seed. She was defeated by number one seed Asmita Dey of India in the semi-final before winning her bronze medal bout against Botho Babutso of Botswana.

== Personal life ==
Shaw qualifies to represent Scotland through her father.

Shaw is currently an undergraduate stduent at the University of Birmingham, reading Biological Science and Genetics.
