= Ben Sandilands =

British athlete (born 2003)

Personal information
- Born: 7 August 2003 (age 23) Kirkcaldy, Scotland

Sport
- Country: Scotland; United Kingdom
- Sport: Para-athletics
- Disability class: T20
- Club: Fife Athletic Club
Medal record
Representing Great Britain
Paralympic Games
Gold medal – first place	2024 Paris	1500 m T20
Representing Scotland
Commonwealth Games
Gold medal – first place	2026 Glasgow	1500 m T20

Ben Sandilands (born 7 August 2003) is a British athlete. He competed at the 2024 Summer Paralympics and won the gold medal in the men's 1500 m T20 event, breaking the world record in the process with a time of 3:45.40.

He went to Balwearie High School and started training in athletics at 9 years old following a race in Beveridge Park.
