= Zeddy Cherotich =

Kenyan judoka

Personal information
- Born: 6 May 1990 (age 36)
- Occupation: Judoka

Sport
- Country: Kenya
- Sport: Judo
- Weight class: ‍–‍78 kg

Achievements and titles
- Olympic Games: R32 (2024)
- World Champ.: R32 (2024)
- African Champ.: (bronze) (2026)
Medal record
Women's judo
Representing Kenya
African Championships
Bronze medal – third place	2026 Nairobi	‍–‍78 kg

Profile at external databases
- IJF: 78384
- JudoInside.com: 164274
- Updated on 18 June 2026

Zeddy Cherotich (born 6 May 1990) is a Kenyan judoka. Cherotich originally was a javelin thrower, but switched to judo. She became the first female judoka from Kenya to qualify for the Olympic Games. Representing Kenya at the 2024 Summer Olympics, she participated in the women's 78 kg judo event, losing to Patrícia Sampaio in 20 seconds. At the 2026 African Championships, Cherotich won bronze in the women's 78 kg category after defeating Hajanirina Andriambololona by ippon.
