= James Clegg (swimmer) =

British Paralympic swimmer (born 1994)

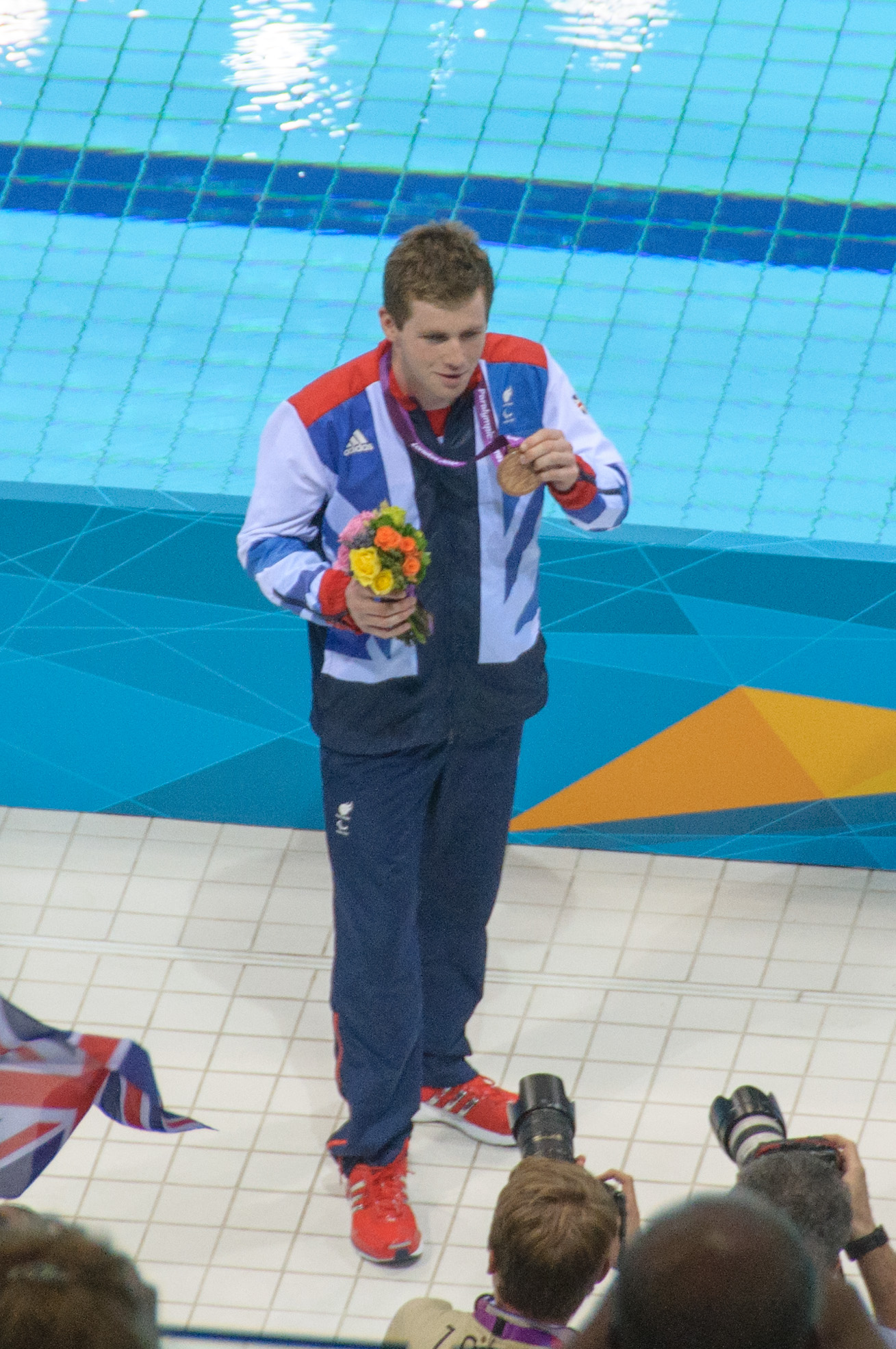
- Clegg at the 2012 Summer Paralympics

Personal information
- Born: 5 January 1994 (age 32) Stockport, England

Sport
- Country: Great Britain; Scotland
- Sport: Swimming
- Club: East Lothian Swim Team
- Coach: Mat Trodden
Medal record
Men's swimming
Representing Great Britain
Paralympic Games
Bronze medal – third place	2012 London	100 m freestyle S12
Representing Scotland
Commonwealth Games
Silver medal – second place	2026 Glasgow	100 m freestyle S13

James Clegg (born 5 January 1994) is a British Paralympic swimmer. Clegg competes in S12 events and qualified for the 2012 Summer Paralympics, winning the bronze in the men's 100 m butterfly event. He is the brother of fellow para-swimmer Stephen Clegg and para-athlete Libby Clegg.

== Early life ==
Clegg was born in Stockport in Greater Manchester, before moving to Newcastleton in the Scottish Borders. He attended the Royal Blind School in Edinburgh.

== Career history ==
Clegg was born in Stockport, England in 1994. Clegg, who is visually impaired, was introduced to disability swimming while a schoolboy. Clegg came to prominence in the run-up to the 2012 Summer Paralympics, coming second in the British Swimming Championships of 2012 in the S12 100m butterfly. His time of 1:01.46 beat Ian Sharpe's 12-year British record. In the 2012 British International Disability Championships, he also posted strong results in the S12 50m and 100m freestyle events, with a time of 26.36 in the 50m.

His events in the 2012 trials, saw Clegg being selected for the Great Britain team in the 100m butterfly and 50m and 100m freestyle for the 2012 Summer Paralympics in London. Clegg was joined in the Great Britain squad by his older sister, Libby, who is also visually impaired. Libby, a sprinter, was chosen for the 100m and 200m sprint.

Clegg's first event at the 2012 Paralympics was his favoured 100m butterfly. He finished third in his heat, with a time of 59.99s. The finals, in the afternoon session, saw him finish in 1:00.00 which was good enough to give him the bronze medal. In the latter stages of the Games he also qualified through both his heats in the freestyle events to challenge in the finals, but failed to win a medal in either.

== Honours ==
Clegg was inducted into the Scottish Swimming Hall of Fame in 2018.
